= Northeast Conference men's basketball tournament =

- Sport: Basketball
- Conference: Northeast Conference
- Number of teams: 9
- Format: Single-elimination tournament
- Current stadium: Campus of highest seed
- Played: 1982–present
- Last contest: 2026
- Current champion: LIU
- Most championships: Robert Morris Colonials (9)
- Official website: NEC Men's Basketball

The Northeast Conference men's basketball tournament is the conference championship tournament in basketball for the Northeast Conference, now officially known by its initialism of NEC. It has been held every year since the NEC was established in the 1981–82 season. The tournament is an eight-team single-elimination tournament and seeding is based on regular season records. The bracket is reseeded after the quarterfinals, with the highest remaining seed playing the lowest remaining seed in the semifinals. The tournament winner receives the conference's automatic bid to the NCAA basketball tournament.

Robert Morris, which left the NEC in 2020 for the Horizon League, is the program that has won the most NEC Tournament Championships (9), followed by current NEC members LIU (7), then Fairleigh Dickinson (6) as well as Mount St. Mary's (also 6), which left the NEC in 2022 for the Metro Atlantic Athletic Conference. LIU, which before 2019–20 represented only the university's Brooklyn campus, has been the only program to win three consecutive tournament championships, from 2011–2013. Robert Morris won back-to-back championships on three occasions (1982–83, 1989–90 and 2009–10), the only other programs to win back-to-back championships, Marist and Rider, are also no longer members of the NEC. Of the current conference members (9 programs), three have not won a championship. Sacred Heart has participated in all NEC tournaments since joining the conference; Le Moyne and Stonehill have yet to participate.

Through the 2022 tournament, schools transitioning from NCAA Division II were ineligible for the conference tournament, paralleling NCAA policy that prohibits such schools from NCAA-sponsored postseason play (either the NCAA tournament or the NIT). After the 2021–22 season, the NEC presidents voted to allow transitional members to participate in the NEC tournament starting with the third season of their four-year transition. Merrimack, which joined the NEC in 2019–20, was thus eligible for the 2023 tournament, its last before completing its D-I transition. Stonehill, a 2022–23 arrival, was only in its first transition year and, therefore not eligible to participate in the 2023 NEC tournament. Under the 2022 rule, should a transitional program win the conference tournament, the automatic NCAA tournament bid went to the other finalist.

Effective for the 2023–24 academic year, NEC teams transitioning from Division II are eligible for the NEC tournament during the entirety of their transition periods. If a reclassifying institution wins the NEC tournament championship, the tournament runner-up will be awarded the NEC's automatic bid to the NCAA tournament. If two reclassifying teams reach the final of the NEC tournament, the conference will stage an automatic qualifier game between the two non-advancing semifinalists. The rule change resulted in Stonehill and Le Moyne being eligible for the 2024 NEC tournament, since that was Stonehill's second transition year and Le Moyne's first. Similarly, Mercyhurst, which joins the NEC from Division II in July 2024, will be eligible for the 2025 NEC tournament.

For the third straight year, the NEC changed its rules regarding eligibility for the conference tournament for the 2024–25 season. Teams transitioning from Division II may participate in the NEC tournament starting with the third year of their transition. Therefore, Mercyhurst will not be eligible for the NEC tournament until 2027. The change is prospective rather than retroactive. Consequently, Le Moyne, in their second transition year, remain eligible for the 2025 tournament.

== History of the tournament final ==
| Year | Champion | Score | Runner-up | Tournament MVP | Location |
|---|---|---|---|---|---|
| 1982 | Robert Morris | 85–84 | Long Island | Tom Parks, RMU | Arnold and Marie Schwartz Athletic Center (Brooklyn, New York) |
| 1983 | Robert Morris | 79–67 | Long Island | Chipper Harris, RMU | John Jay Center (Moon Township, Pennsylvania) |
| 1984 | Long Island | 87–81 | Robert Morris | Carey Scurry, LIU | McCann Field House (Poughkeepsie, New York) |
| 1985 | Fairleigh Dickinson | 63–59 | Loyola (MD) | Larry Hampton, FDU | Reitz Arena (Baltimore, Maryland) |
| 1986 | Marist | 57–56^{OT} | Fairleigh Dickinson | Rik Smits, MARIST | Charles L. Sewall Center (Moon Township, Pennsylvania) |
| 1987 | Marist | 64–55^{OT} | Fairleigh Dickinson | Drafton Davis, MARIST | McCann Field House (Poughkeepsie, New York) |
| 1988 | Fairleigh Dickinson | 90–75 | Monmouth | Jaime Latney, FDU | Rothman Center (Hackensack, New Jersey) |
| 1989 | Robert Morris | 69–68 | Fairleigh Dickinson | Vaughn Luton, RMU | Charles L. Sewall Center (Moon Township, Pennsylvania) |
| 1990 | Robert Morris | 71–66 | Monmouth | Alex Blackwell, MONMOUTH | Charles L. Sewall Center (Moon Township, Pennsylvania) |
| 1991 | St. Francis (PA) | 97–82 | Fairleigh Dickinson | Mike Iuzzolino, SFU | DeGol Arena (Loretto, Pennsylvania) |
| 1992 | Robert Morris | 85–81 | Marist | Myron Walker, RMU | Charles L. Sewall Center (Moon Township, Pennsylvania) |
| 1993 | Rider | 65–64 | Wagner | Darrick Suber, RIDER | Alumni Gymnasium (Lawrenceville, New Jersey) |
| 1994 | Rider | 62–56 | Monmouth | Charles Smith, RIDER | Alumni Gymnasium (Lawrenceville, New Jersey) |
| 1995 | Mount St. Mary's | 69–62 | Rider | Silas Cheung, MSM | Alumni Gymnasium (Lawrenceville, New Jersey) |
| 1996 | Monmouth | 60–59 | Rider | Corey Albano, MONMOUTH | William T. Boylan Gymnasium (West Long Branch, New Jersey) |
| 1997 | Long Island | 72–67 | Monmouth | Charles Jones, LIU | Schwartz Athletic Center (Brooklyn, New York) |
| 1998 | Fairleigh Dickinson | 105–91 | Long Island | Rahshon Turner, FDU | Schwartz Athletic Center (Brooklyn, New York) |
| 1999 | Mount St. Mary's | 72–56 | Central Connecticut | Gregory Harris, MSM | Spiro Sports Center (Staten Island, New York) |
| 2000 | Central Connecticut | 63–46 | Robert Morris | Rick Mickens, CCSU | Sovereign Bank Arena (Trenton, New Jersey) |
| 2001 | Monmouth | 67–64 | St. Francis (BKN) | Rahsaan Johnson, MONMOUTH | Sovereign Bank Arena (Trenton, New Jersey) |
| 2002 | Central Connecticut | 78–71 | Quinnipiac | Damian Battles, CCSU | William H. Detrick Gymnasium (New Britain, Connecticut) |
| 2003 | Wagner | 78–61 | St. Francis (BKN) | Jermaine Hall, WAGNER | Spiro Sports Center (Staten Island, New York) |
| 2004 | Monmouth | 67–55 | Central Connecticut | Blake Hamilton, MONMOUTH | William T. Boylan Gymnasium (West Long Branch, New Jersey) |
| 2005 | Fairleigh Dickinson | 58–52 | Wagner | Tamien Trent, FDU | Rothman Center (Hackensack, New Jersey) |
| 2006 | Monmouth | 49–48 | Fairleigh Dickinson | Marques Alston, MONMOUTH | Rothman Center (Hackensack, New Jersey) |
| 2007 | Central Connecticut | 74–70 | Sacred Heart | Javier Mojica, CCSU | William H. Detrick Gymnasium (New Britain, Connecticut) |
| 2008 | Mount St. Mary's | 68–55 | Sacred Heart | Jean Cajou, MSM | William H. Pitt Center (Fairfield, Connecticut) |
| 2009 | Robert Morris | 48–46 | Mount St. Mary's | Jeremy Chappell, RMU | Charles L. Sewall Center (Moon Township, Pennsylvania) |
| 2010 | Robert Morris | 52–50 | Quinnipiac | Karon Abraham, RMU | TD Bank Sports Center (Hamden, Connecticut) |
| 2011 | Long Island | 85–82^{OT} | Robert Morris | Jamal Olasewere, LIU | Wellness, Recreation & Athletics Center (Brooklyn, New York) |
| 2012 | Long Island | 90–73 | Robert Morris | Julian Boyd, LIU | Wellness, Recreation & Athletics Center (Brooklyn, New York) |
| 2013 | Long Island | 91–70 | Mount St. Mary's | C. J. Garner, LIU | Wellness, Recreation & Athletics Center (Brooklyn, New York) |
| 2014 | Mount St. Mary's | 88–71 | Robert Morris | Rashad Whack, MSM | Charles L. Sewall Center (Moon Township, Pennsylvania) |
| 2015 | Robert Morris | 66–63 | St. Francis (BKN) | Rodney Prior, RMU | Generoso Pope Athletic Complex (Brooklyn, New York) |
| 2016 | Fairleigh Dickinson | 87–79 | Wagner | Earl Potts, Jr., FDU | Spiro Sports Center (Staten Island, New York) |
| 2017 | Mount St. Mary's | 71–61 | St. Francis (PA) | Elijah Long, MSM | Knott Arena (Emmitsburg, Maryland) |
| 2018 | Long Island | 71–61 | Wagner | Joel Hernandez, LIU | Spiro Sports Center (Staten Island, New York) |
| 2019 | Fairleigh Dickinson | 85–76 | St. Francis (PA) | Darnell Edge, FDU | DeGol Arena (Loretto, Pennsylvania) |
| 2020 | Robert Morris | 77–67 | St. Francis (PA) | Dante Treacy, RMU | UPMC Events Center (Moon Township, Pennsylvania) |
| 2021 | Mount St. Mary's | 73–68 | Bryant | Nana Opoku, MSM | Chace Athletic Center (Smithfield, Rhode Island) |
| 2022 | Bryant | 70–43 | Wagner | Peter Kiss, BU | Chace Athletic Center (Smithfield, Rhode Island) |
| 2023 | Merrimack | 67–66 | Fairleigh Dickinson | Ziggy Reid, MRMK | Lawler Arena (North Andover, Massachusetts) |
| 2024 | Wagner | 54–47 | Merrimack | Tahron Allen, WAGNER | Lawler Arena (North Andover, Massachusetts) |
| 2025 | St. Francis (PA) | 46–43 | Central Connecticut | Juan Cranford Jr., SFU | William H. Detrick Gymnasium (New Britain, Connecticut) |
| 2026 | LIU | 79–70 | Mercyhurst | Greg Gordon, LIU | Steinberg Wellness Center (Brooklyn, New York) |

== Championships by school ==
| ‡ | Denotes school is a former member of the NEC, as of the 2026–27 NCAA basketball season |

| School | Championships | Championship Years |
|---|---|---|
| Robert Morris^{‡} | 9 | 1982, 1983, 1989, 1990, 1992, 2009, 2010, 2015, 2020 |
| LIU (Note: From 1981 to 2019, Long Island University was represented in the Northeast Conference by its Brooklyn campus, known for athletic purposes as "Long Island" through the 2012–13 season and "LIU Brooklyn" from 2013–14 forward. After the 2018–19 season, LIU merged the athletic programs of its Brooklyn and Post campuses into a single program, now competing as the LIU Sharks, that inherited the NCAA Division I and Northeast Conference memberships of the Brooklyn campus.) | 7 | 1984, 1997, 2011, 2012, 2013, 2018, 2026 |
| Fairleigh Dickinson | 6 | 1985, 1988, 1998, 2005, 2016, 2019 |
| Mount St. Mary's^{‡} | 6 | 1995, 1999, 2008, 2014, 2017, 2021 |
| Monmouth^{‡} | 4 | 1996, 2001, 2004, 2006 |
| Central Connecticut | 3 | 2000, 2002, 2007 |
| Marist^{‡} | 2 | 1986, 1987 |
| Rider^{‡} | 2 | 1993, 1994 |
| Wagner | 2 | 2003, 2024 |
| Saint Francis (PA)^{‡} | 2 | 1991, 2025 |
| Bryant^{‡} | 1 | 2022 |
| Merrimack^{‡} | 1 | 2023 |
| St. Francis Brooklyn^{‡} | 0 | — |
| Quinnipiac^{‡} | 0 | — |
| Sacred Heart^{‡} | 0 | — |
| Loyola (MD)^{‡} | 0 | — |
| Le Moyne (Note: Le Moyne, which started a transition from NCAA Division II in 2023, is not eligible for NCAA-sponsored postseason play in any of its sports until the 2026–27 school year. Under NEC rules at the time, it was immediately eligible to participate in the NEC tournament. When the NEC made its most recent change to eligibility rules for its tournament in 2024–25, Le Moyne was grandfathered in as a tournament-eligible team.) | 0 | — |
| Stonehill (Note: The 2025–26 season is the first in which Stonehill, which started a transition from NCAA Division II in 2022, will be eligible for NCAA-sponsored postseason basketball play. Stonehill was eligible to participate in the NEC tournament for the first time in 2024.) | 0 | — |
| Chicago State | 0 | — |
| Mercyhurst (Note: Mercyhurst, which started a transition from NCAA Division II in 2024, is not eligible for NCAA-sponsored postseason play in any of its sports except men's and women's ice hockey until the 2027–28 school year. Under current NEC rules, it will not be eligible for the conference tournament until 2026–27.) | 0 | — |
| New Haven (Note: New Haven, which started a transition from NCAA Division II in 2025, is not eligible for NCAA-sponsored postseason play in any of its sports until the 2028–29 school year. Under current NEC rules, it will not be eligible for the conference tournament until 2027–28.) | 0 | — |

== NCAA Tournament appearances ==
| Year | NEC Team | Opponent | Result |
|---|---|---|---|
| 1982 | (12) Robert Morris | (5) Indiana | L 62–94 |
| 1983 | (12) Robert Morris | (12) Georgia Southern (5) Purdue | W 64–54; L 53–55 |
| 1984 | (11) Long Island | (11) Northeastern | L 87–90 |
| 1985 | (16) Fairleigh Dickinson | (1) Michigan | L 55–59 |
| 1986 | (15) Marist | (2) Georgia Tech | L 53–68 |
| 1987 | (14) Marist | (3) Pittsburgh | L 68–93 |
| 1988 | (16) Fairleigh Dickinson | (1) Purdue | L 79–94 |
| 1989 | (16) Robert Morris | (1) Arizona | L 60–94 |
| 1990 | (15) Robert Morris | (2) Kansas | L 71–79 |
| 1991 | (15) Saint Francis (PA) | (2) Arizona | L 80–93 |
| 1992 | (16) Robert Morris | (1) UCLA | L 53–73 |
| 1993 | (16) Rider | (1) Kentucky | L 52–96 |
| 1994 | (15) Rider | (2) Connecticut | L 46–64 |
| 1995 | (16) Mount St. Mary's | (1) Kentucky | L 67–113 |
| 1996 | (13) Monmouth | (4) Marquette | L 44–68 |
| 1997 | (13) Long Island | (4) Villanova | L 91–101 |
| 1998 | (15) Fairleigh Dickinson | (2) Connecticut | L 85–93 |
| 1999 | (16) Mount St. Mary's | (1) Michigan State | L 53–76 |
| 2000 | (15) Central Connecticut State | (2) Iowa State | L 78–88 |
| 2001 | (16) Monmouth | (1) Duke | L 52–95 |
| 2002 | (14) Central Connecticut State | (3) Pittsburgh | L 54–71 |
| 2003 | (15) Wagner | (2) Pittsburgh | L 61–87 |
| 2004 | (15) Monmouth | (2) Mississippi State | L 52–85 |
| 2005 | (16) Fairleigh Dickinson | (1) Illinois | L 55–67 |
| 2006 | (16) Monmouth | (16) Hampton (1) Villanova | W 71–49; L 45–58 |
| 2007 | (16) Central Connecticut State | (1) Ohio State | L 57–78 |
| 2008 | (16a) Mount St. Mary's | (16b) Coppin State (1) North Carolina | W 69–60; L 74–113 |
| 2009 | (15) Robert Morris | (2) Michigan State | L 62–77 |
| 2010 | (15) Robert Morris | (2) Villanova | L 70–73^{OT} |
| 2011 | (15) Long Island | (2) North Carolina | L 87–102 |
| 2012 | (16) Long Island | (1) Michigan State | L 67–89 |
| 2013 | (16) Long Island | (16) James Madison | L 55–68 |
| 2014 | (16) Mount St. Mary's | (16) Albany | L 64–71 |
| 2015 | (16) Robert Morris | (16) North Florida (1) Duke | W 81–77; L 56–85 |
| 2016 | (16) Fairleigh Dickinson | (16) Florida Gulf Coast | L 65–96 |
| 2017 | (16) Mount St. Mary's | (16) New Orleans (1) Villanova | W 67–66; L 56–76 |
| 2018 | (16) Long Island | (16) Radford | L 61–71 |
| 2019 | (16) Fairleigh Dickinson | (16) Prairie View A&M (1) Gonzaga | W 82–76; L 49–87 |
| 2021 | (16) Mount St. Mary's | (16) Texas Southern | L 52–60 |
| 2022 | (16) Bryant | (16) Wright State | L 82–93 |
| 2023 | (16) Fairleigh Dickinson | (16) Texas Southern (1) Purdue (9) Florida Atlantic | W 84–61; W 63–58; L 70–78 |
| 2024 | (16) Wagner | (16) Howard (1) North Carolina | W 71–68; L 62–90 |
| 2025 | (16) Saint Francis (PA) | (16) Alabama State | L 68–70 |
| 2026 | (16) Long Island | (1) Arizona | L 58–92 |

- 2020 NCAA tournament was canceled due to COVID-19.

== Broadcasters ==
=== Television ===
| Year | Network | Play-by-play | Analyst | Sideline reporter |
|---|---|---|---|---|
| 2026 | ESPN2 | Jay Alter | Dan Bonner | |
| 2025 | ESPN2 | Doug Sherman | Tim Welsh | |
| 2024 | ESPN2 | Doug Sherman | Tim Welsh | |
| 2023 | ESPN2 | Doug Sherman | Tim Welsh | |
| 2022 | ESPN2 | Doug Sherman | Tim Welsh | |
| 2021 | ESPN2 | Rich Hollenberg | Dan Dakich | |
| 2020 | ESPN2 | Dave Flemming | Sydney Johnson | Meaghan McKeown |
| 2019 | ESPN2 | Mike Couzens | Chris Spatola | |
| 2018 | ESPN2 | Rece Davis | Tom Crean | |
| 2017 | ESPN2 | Rece Davis | Jim Calhoun | |
| 2016 | ESPN2 | Karl Ravech | Jim Calhoun | |
| 2015 | ESPN2 | John Brickley | Craig Robinson | |
| 2014 | ESPN2 | Mike Crispino | Miles Simon | |
| 2013 | ESPN2 | Mike Crispino | Tim Welsh | |
| 2012 | ESPN2 | Jon Sciambi | Tim Welsh | |
| 2011 | ESPN2 | Jon Sciambi | LaPhonso Ellis | |
| 2010 | ESPN2 | Bob Wischusen | Tim Welsh | |

=== Radio ===
| Year | Network | Play-by-play | Analyst |
|---|---|---|---|
| 2016 | Westwood One | Gary Cohen | Doug Gottlieb |
| 2015 | Westwood One | Jason Benetti | Alaa Abdelnaby |
| 2014 | Westwood One | John Sadak | Donny Marshall |
| 2013 | Dial Global | John Sadak | Kelly Tripucka |
| 2011 | Westwood One | John Tautges | Alaa Abdelnaby |

== See also ==
- Northeast Conference women's basketball tournament
