= List of Monmouth Hawks men's basketball head coaches =

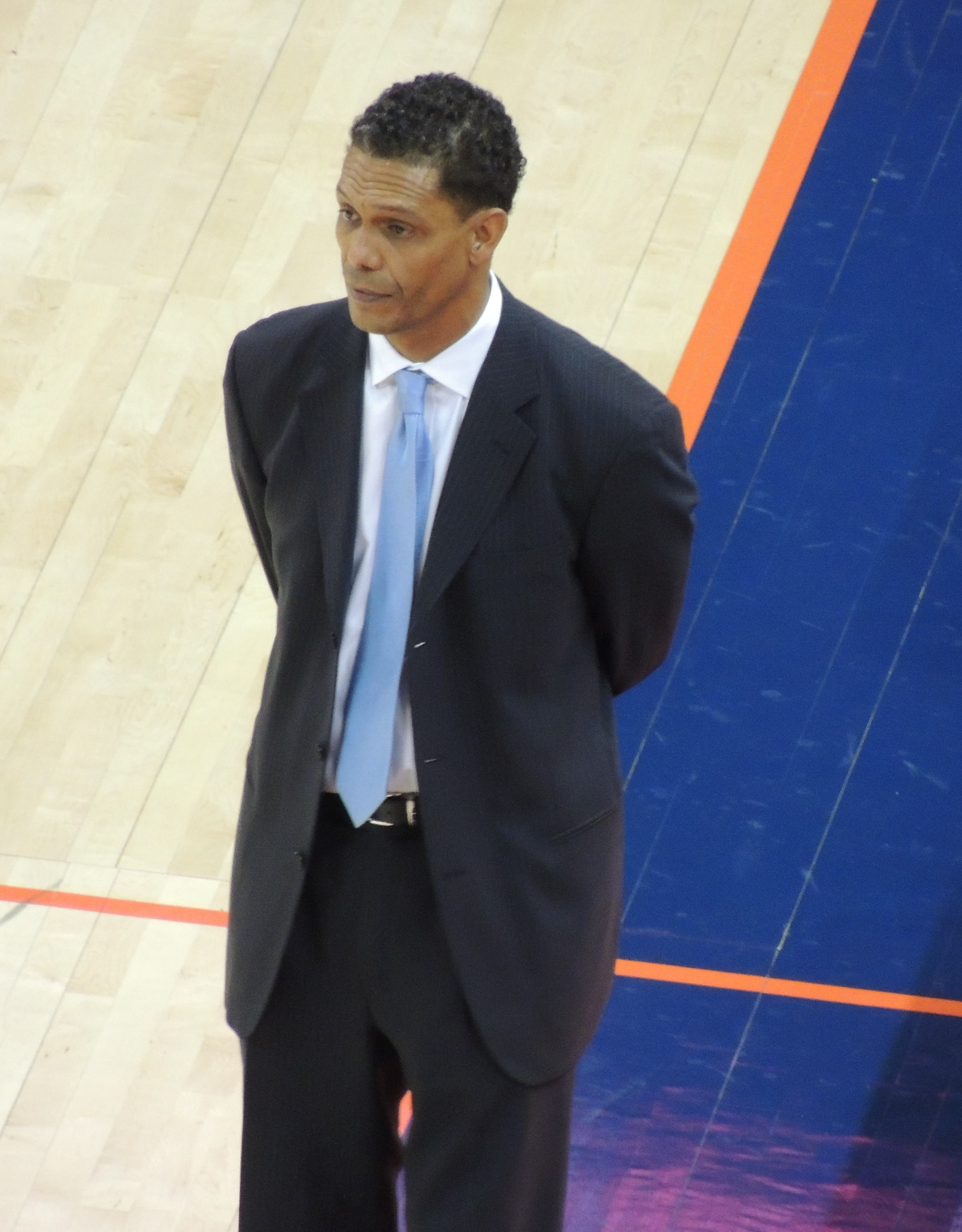
King Rice, the current head coach of the Monmouth Hawks.

The following is a list of Monmouth Hawks men's basketball head coaches. There have been six head coaches of the Hawks in their 67-season history.

Monmouth's current head coach is King Rice. He was hired as the Hawks' head coach in March 2011, replacing Dave Calloway, who resigned after the 2010–11 season.

No.	Tenure	Coach	Years	Record	Pct.
1	1956–1977	Bill Boylan	21	364–157	.699
2	1977–1986 (Note: Kornegay resigned on December 19, 1986. Ron Krayl served as interim head coach for the remainder of the 1986–87 season.)	Ron Kornegay	10	129–130	.498
3	1986–1987*	Ron Krayl	1	7–13	.350
4	1987–1998 (Note: Szoke resigned on January 18, 1998. Dave Calloway served as interim head coach for the remainder of the 1997–98 season.)	Wayne Szoke	11	168–133	.558
5	1998–2011 (Note: After serving as interim head coach for the end of the 1997–98 season, Calloway was named permanent head coach in February 1998.)	Dave Calloway	14	178–227	.440
6	2011–present	King Rice	12	189–193	.495
Totals		6 coaches	67 seasons	1,035–853	.548
Records updated through end of 2022–23 season Source
