= 2007–08 St. Francis Terriers men's basketball team =

American college basketball season

2007–08 St. Francis Terriers men's basketball
- Conference: Northeast Conference
- Record: 7–22 (4–14 NEC)
- Head coach: Brian Nash (3rd season)
- Assistant coaches: Clive Bentick (1st season); Jim Datka (3rd season); Michael Netti (2nd season)
- Home arena: Generoso Pope Athletic Complex

2007–08 Northeast Conference men's basketball standings
	Conf.				Overall
Team	W		L	PCT	W		L	PCT
Robert Morris	16	–	2	.889	26	–	8	.765
Wagner	15	–	3	.833	23	–	8	.742
Sacred Heart	13	–	5	.722	18	–	14	.563
Mount St. Mary's †	11	–	7	.611	19	–	15	.559
Quinnipiac	11	–	7	.611	15	–	15	.500
Central Connecticut	10	–	8	.556	14	–	16	.467
Long Island	7	–	11	.389	15	–	15	.500
Monmouth	4	–	14	.222	7	–	24	.226
Fairleigh Dickinson	4	–	14	.222	8	–	20	.286
St. Francis (NY)	4	–	14	.222	7	–	22	.241
Saint Francis (PA)	4	–	14	.222	6	–	23	.207
† 2008 NEC tournament winner

The 2007–08 St. Francis Terriers men's basketball team represented St. Francis College during the 2007–08 NCAA Division I men's basketball season. The team was coached by Brian Nash, who was in his third year at the helm of the St. Francis Terriers. The Terrier's home games were played at the Generoso Pope Athletic Complex. The team has been a member of the Northeast Conference since 1981.

Nash's team finished at 7–22 overall and 4–14 in conference play for an 8th-place finish.

== Roster ==
2007–08 St. Francis Brooklyn Terriers men's basketball team
Players
Coaches

Pos.	#	Name	Height	Weight	Year	Hometown
F	10	Sami Pekkola	6 ft 7 in (2.01 m)	220 lb (100 kg)	Sr	Lahti, Finland
F	12	Robert Hines	6 ft 5 in (1.96 m)	250 lb (113 kg)	Sr	Trenton, NJ
G	5	Marcus Williams	6 ft 3 in (1.91 m)	220 lb (100 kg)	Sr	Jersey City, NJ
F	20	Bassith Yessoufou	6 ft 9 in (2.06 m)	218 lb (99 kg)	Sr	San Luis Obispo, CA
G	2	Otis Campbell	6 ft 2 in (1.88 m)	215 lb (98 kg)	Jr	Jersey City, NJ
G	3	Jamaal Womack (C)	5 ft 8 in (1.73 m)	170 lb (77 kg)	Jr	Bronx, NY
F	44	John Gooden	6 ft 6 in (1.98 m)	220 lb (100 kg)	Jr	Bronx, NY
F	21	David Burton	6 ft 5 in (1.96 m)	220 lb (100 kg)	So	Philadelphia, PA
G/F	32	Kayode Ayeni	6 ft 5 in (1.96 m)	180 lb (82 kg)	So	Brooklyn, NY
F	1	Rainier Rickards	6 ft 5 in (1.96 m)	195 lb (88 kg)	So	Queens, NY
G	4	Lateef Willis	5 ft 8 in (1.73 m)	170 lb (77 kg)	So	Bronx, NY
G	11	Ricky Cadell	6 ft 2 in (1.88 m)	180 lb (82 kg)	Fr	Bronx, NY
G	45	Rocco Rubino	6 ft 2 in (1.88 m)	165 lb (75 kg)	Fr	Brooklyn, NY
F	15	Eion Lewis	6 ft 5 in (1.96 m)	175 lb (79 kg)	Fr	Brooklyn, NY
F	40	Quraan Davis	6 ft 6 in (1.98 m)	185 lb (84 kg)	Fr	Brooklyn, NY

Head coach

- Brian Nash (Keene State '92)

Assistant coach(es)

- Jim Datka (Wisconsin Lutheran '88)

Legend

- (C) Team captain
- (S) Suspended
- (I) Ineligible
- (W) Walk-on
- Injured
- Current redshirt

Roster
Last update: April 1, 2008

== Schedule and results ==
Date time, TV	Opponent	Result	Record	Site (attendance) city, state
Regular Season
November 9, 2007*; 7:00 pm	Hartford	W 62–59	1–0	Generoso Pope Athletic Complex (515); Brooklyn, NY
November 14, 2007*; 7:30 pm	St. John's (NY)	L 64–72	1–1	Carnesecca Arena (3,395); Queens, NY
November 17, 2007*; 7:00 pm	at Maine	L 82–85 ^{OT}	1–2	Alfond Arena (1,358); Orono, ME
November 21, 2007*; 7:00 pm	Hofstra	W 60–57	2–2	Generoso Pope Athletic Complex (616); Brooklyn, NY
November 24, 2007*; 7:00 pm	at Manhattan	L 69–77	2–3	Draddy Gymnasium; Bronx, NY
November 28, 2007*; 7:00 pm	Fairfield	W 55–51	3–3	Generoso Pope Athletic Complex (302); Brooklyn, NY
December 2, 2007*; 2:00 pm	Ohio	L 63–67	3–4	Generoso Pope Athletic Complex (307); Brooklyn, NY
December 6, 2007; 7:00 pm	at Quinnipiac	L 79–90	3–5 (0–1)	TD Banknorth Sports Center (1,487); Hamden, CT
December 8, 2007; 12:00 pm	at Wagner	L 59–64	3–6 (0–2)	Spiro Sports Center (1,445); Staten Island, NY
December 10, 2007*; 7:00 pm	at Columbia	L 64–83	3–7	Levien Gymnasium (355); Manhattan, NY
December 15, 2007*; 2:00 pm	at Albany	L 53–66	3–8	SEFCU Arena (2,067); Albany, NY
December 22, 2007*; 7:00 pm	at South Florida	L 66–86	3–9	USF Sun Dome (2,955); Tampa, FL
December 29, 2007*; 7:00 pm	Navy	L 83–85	3–10	Generoso Pope Athletic Complex (278); Brooklyn, NY
January 3, 2008; 7:00 pm	Mount St. Mary's	L 60–68	3–11 (0–3)	Generoso Pope Athletic Complex (203); Brooklyn, NY
January 5, 2008; 4:00 pm	Central Connecticut State	L 75–80 ^{OT}	3–12 (0–4)	Generoso Pope Athletic Complex (278); Brooklyn, NY
January 10, 2008; 7:00 pm	at Sacred Heart	W 73–63	4–12 (1–4)	William H. Pitt Center (507); Fairfield, CT
January 12, 2008; 7:00 pm	at Fairleigh Dickinson	W 88–83	5–12 (2–4)	Rothman Center (548); Hackensack, NJ
January 17, 2008; 7:00 pm	Quinnipiac	L 72–75	5–13 (2–5)	Generoso Pope Athletic Complex (387); Brooklyn, NY
January 19, 2008; 4:00 pm	Monmouth	L 60–62 ^{OT}	5–14 (2–6)	Generoso Pope Athletic Complex (405); Brooklyn, NY
January 24, 2008; 7:00 pm	at Saint Francis (PA)	L 84–92 ^{3OT}	5–15 (2–7)	DeGol Arena (827); Loretto, PA
January 26, 2008; 7:00 pm	at Robert Morris	L 78–83	5–16 (2–8)	Charles L. Sewall Center (1,087); Moon Township, PA
January 31, 2008; 7:00 pm	at Mount St. Mary's	L 60–97	5–17 (2–9)	Knott Arena (1,002); Emmitsburg, MD
February 2, 2008; 4:00 pm	Sacred Heart	L 59–63	5–18 (2–10)	Generoso Pope Athletic Complex (304); Brooklyn, NY
February 9, 2008; 2:00 pm	at Central Connecticut State	L 61–76	5–19 (2–11)	William H. Detrick Gymnasium (2,156); New Britain, CT
February 14, 2008; 7:00 pm	Saint Francis (PA)	L 50–63	5–20 (2–12)	Generoso Pope Athletic Complex (202); Brooklyn, NY
February 16, 2008; 2:00 pm	Robert Morris	L 65–73	5–21 (2–13)	Generoso Pope Athletic Complex (623); Brooklyn, NY
February 21, 2008; 7:30 pm	at Long Island; Battle of Brooklyn	W 67–64	6–21 (3–13)	Wellness, Recreation & Athletics Center (1,100); Brooklyn, NY
February 23, 2008; 4:00 pm	Fairleigh Dickinson	L 70–74	7–21 (4–13)	Generoso Pope Athletic Complex (308); Brooklyn, NY
February 28, 2008; 7:00 pm	Long Island	L 68–83	7–22 (4–14)	Generoso Pope Athletic Complex (487); Brooklyn, NY
*Non-conference game. ^{#}Rankings from AP Poll. (#) Tournament seedings in parentheses.
