= 2000–01 Monmouth Hawks men's basketball team =

American college basketball season

2000–01 Monmouth Hawks men's basketball

Northeast Conference tournament champions

NCAA tournament
- Conference: Northeast Conference
- Record: 21–10 (15–5 NEC)
- Head coach: Dave Calloway (4th season)
- Home arena: William T. Boylan Gymnasium

2000–01 Northeast Conference men's basketball standings
	Conf.				Overall
Team	W		L	PCT	W		L	PCT
St. Francis (NY)	16	–	4	.800	18	–	11	.621
Monmouth †	15	–	5	.750	21	–	10	.677
UMBC	13	–	7	.650	18	–	11	.621
Long Island	12	–	8	.600	12	–	16	.429
Wagner	11	–	9	.550	16	–	13	.552
Central Connecticut	11	–	9	.550	14	–	14	.500
Fairleigh Dickinson	10	–	10	.500	13	–	15	.464
Saint Francis (PA)	9	–	11	.450	9	–	18	.333
Mount St. Mary's	7	–	13	.350	7	–	21	.250
Robert Morris	7	–	13	.350	7	–	22	.241
Sacred Heart	6	–	14	.300	7	–	21	.250
Quinnipiac	3	–	17	.150	6	–	21	.222
† 2001 NEC tournament winner

The 2000–01 Monmouth Hawks men's basketball team represented Monmouth University during the 2000–01 NCAA Division I men's basketball season. The Hawks, led by fourth-year head coach Dave Calloway, played their home games at the William T. Boylan Gymnasium and were members of the Northeast Conference. They finished the season 21–10, 15–5 in NEC play to finish in second place. They won the Northeast Conference Basketball tournament to earn the conference's automatic bid to the NCAA tournament. Playing as the No. 16 seed in the East region, the Hawks were beaten by No. 1 seed and eventual National champion Duke in the opening round.

== Roster ==
2000–01 Monmouth Hawks men's basketball team
Players	Coaches
Pos. / # / Name / Height / Weight / Year / Hometown; G / / Rahsaan Johnson / 6 ft 3 in (1.91 m) / — / Jr	Head coach: Dave Calloway; Assistant coach(es) Legend: (C) Team captain; (S) Suspended; (I) Ineligible; (W) Walk-on; Injured; Current redshirt; Roster

== Schedule and results ==
Date time, TV	Rank^{#}	Opponent^{#}	Result	Record	Site (attendance) city, state
Regular season
Nov 21, 2000*		at Rider	L 63–65	0–1	Alumni Gymnasium; Lawrenceville, New Jersey
Nov 25, 2000*		Princeton	W 70–59	1–1	Boylan Gymnasium; West Long Branch, New Jersey
Nov 27, 2000*		at Drexel	L 61–66	1–2	Daskalakis Athletic Center; Philadelphia, Pennsylvania
Dec 28, 2000*		at UNLV	L 70–81	6–3	Thomas & Mack Center; Las Vegas, Nevada
Dec 30, 2000*		at Gonzaga	L 69–95	6–4	Charlotte Y. Martin Centre; Spokane, Washington
NEC tournament
Mar 3, 2001*		vs. Fairleigh Dickinson	W 71–59	19–9	Sun National Bank Center; Trenton, New Jersey
Mar 4, 2001*		vs. UMBC	W 67–54	20–9	Sun National Bank Center; Trenton, New Jersey
Mar 5, 2001*		vs. St. Francis (NY)	W 67–64	21–9	Sun National Bank Center; Trenton, New Jersey
NCAA tournament
Mar 15, 2001*	(16 E)	vs. (1 E) No. 1 Duke; First round	L 52–95	21–10	Greensboro Coliseum; Greensboro, North Carolina
*Non-conference game. ^{#}Rankings from AP Poll. (#) Tournament seedings in parentheses. E=East. All times are in Eastern Time.
