= 2001 Northeast Conference men's basketball tournament =

- Classification: Division I
- Season: 2000–01
- Teams: 7
- Site: Sovereign Bank Arena; Trenton, NJ
- Champions: Monmouth (2nd title)
- Winning coach: Dave Calloway (1st title)
- MVP: Rahsaan Johnson (MU)

2000–01 Northeast Conference men's basketball standings
	Conf.				Overall
Team	W		L	PCT	W		L	PCT
St. Francis (NY)	16	–	4	.800	18	–	11	.621
Monmouth †	15	–	5	.750	21	–	10	.677
UMBC	13	–	7	.650	18	–	11	.621
Long Island	12	–	8	.600	12	–	16	.429
Wagner	11	–	9	.550	16	–	13	.552
Central Connecticut	11	–	9	.550	14	–	14	.500
Fairleigh Dickinson	10	–	10	.500	13	–	15	.464
Saint Francis (PA)	9	–	11	.450	9	–	18	.333
Mount St. Mary's	7	–	13	.350	7	–	21	.250
Robert Morris	7	–	13	.350	7	–	22	.241
Sacred Heart	6	–	14	.300	7	–	21	.250
Quinnipiac	3	–	17	.150	6	–	21	.222
† 2001 NEC tournament winner

The 2001 Northeast Conference men's basketball tournament was held in March. The tournament featured the league's top eight seeds. Monmouth won the championship, its second, and received the conference's automatic bid to the 2001 NCAA Tournament.

== Format ==
The NEC Men's Basketball Tournament consisted of the conferences top seven teams. All games were played at Sovereign Bank Arena in Trenton, NJ. The #1 seed received a bye for the first round.

== Bracket ==
Quarterfinals
4	Long Island	83
5	Wagner	88
2	Monmouth	71
7	Fairleigh Dickinson	59
3	UMBC	59
6	Central Connecticut	44

Semifinals
1	St. Francis (NY)	72
5	Wagner	65
2	Monmouth	67
3	UMBC	54

Finals
1	St. Francis (NY)	64
2	Monmouth	67

== All-tournament team ==
Tournament MVP in bold.

**2001 NEC All-Tournament Team**

**Rahsaan Johnson**, MU
Gerry Crosby, MU
Richy Dominguez, SFNY
Steven Howard, SFNY
Jermaine Hall, WAGNER
