= 1992–93 St. Francis Terriers men's basketball team =

American college basketball season

1992–93 St. Francis Terriers men's basketball
- Conference: Northeast Conference
- Record: 9–18 (8–10 NEC)
- Head coach: Ron Ganulin (2nd season)
- Assistant coach: Glenn Braica (4th season)
- Home arena: Generoso Pope Athletic Complex

1992–93 Northeast Conference men's basketball standings
	Conf.				Overall
Team	W		L	PCT	W		L	PCT
Rider †	14	–	4	.778	19	–	11	.633
Wagner	12	–	6	.667	18	–	12	.600
Mount St. Mary's	10	–	8	.556	14	–	16	.467
Marist	10	–	8	.556	14	–	16	.467
Fairleigh Dickinson	8	–	10	.444	11	–	17	.393
St. Francis Brooklyn	8	–	10	.444	9	–	18	.333
Saint Francis (PA)	7	–	11	.389	9	–	18	.333
Robert Morris	7	–	11	.389	9	–	18	.333
Long Island	7	–	11	.389	9	–	18	.333
Monmouth	7	–	11	.389	11	–	17	.393
† 1993 NEC tournament winner

The 1992–93 St. Francis Terriers men's basketball team represented St. Francis College during the 1992–93 NCAA Division I men's basketball season. The team was coached by Ron Ganulin, who was in his second year at the helm of the St. Francis Terriers. The Terrier's home games were played at the Generoso Pope Athletic Complex. The team has been a member of the Northeast Conference since 1981.

The Terriers finished their season at 9–18 overall and 8–10 in conference play.

On February 4, 1993, Ron Arnold set the Terrier record for steals in a game, 11, against Mount St. Mary's. Arnold's 11 steals are also tied for third most in NCAA history.

== Roster ==
1992–93 St. Francis Brooklyn Terriers men's basketball team
Players
Coaches

Pos.	#	Name	Height	Weight	Year	Previous school	Hometown
G		Charles Hatcher	6 ft 2 in (1.88 m)	—	Sr
F		Ron Arnold	6 ft 6 in (1.98 m)	—	Sr	Rice High School	New York, NY
G		Louis Myers	6 ft 2 in (1.88 m)	—	Sr
F		James Harrell	6 ft 7 in (2.01 m)	—	Jr
C		Robert Galloway	6 ft 9 in (2.06 m)	—	Jr
F		Leo Vorvolakos	6 ft 6 in (1.98 m)	—	Jr
G		Jeff Myers	6 ft 1 in (1.85 m)	—	Fr
F		Abdu Torrence	6 ft 7 in (2.01 m)	—	Fr
F		Danny Manning	6 ft 6 in (1.98 m)	—	Fr
F		Chris Ortiz	6 ft 5 in (1.96 m)	—	Fr
G		Deloyd Chapman	6 ft 5 in (1.96 m)	—	Fr
G		Jamel Thompson	6 ft 0 in (1.83 m)	—	Fr
G		Mike Saenger	6 ft 0 in (1.83 m)	—	Fr
F		Esaun Pinto	6 ft 6 in (1.98 m)	—	Fr

Head coach

- Ron Ganulin (LIU Brooklyn '67)

Assistant coach(es)

- Glenn Braica (Queens College '89)

Legend

- (C) Team captain
- (S) Suspended
- (I) Ineligible
- (W) Walk-on
- Injured
- Current redshirt

== Schedule and results ==
Date time, TV	Opponent	Result	Record	Site (attendance) city, state
Regular season
November __, 1992*	at St. John's	L 68–101	0–1	Carnesecca Arena (5,290); Queens, NY
December __, 1992*	at Columbia	L 67–104	0–2	Levien Gymnasium (3,000); New York, NY
December __, 1992*	at Yale	W 62–61	1–2	Payne Whitney Gymnasium (204); New Haven, CT
December __, 1992*	at Delaware State	L 71–80	1–3	Memorial Hall (400); Dover, DE
December 11, 1992*	at Tennessee State	L 73–79 ^{OT}	1–4	Gentry Complex (825); Nashville, TN
December __, 1992*	at Columbia	L 50–58	1–5	Levien Gymnasium (675); New York, NY
December __, 1992*	at Colorado	L 61–79	1–6	Coors Events Center (13,473); Boulder, CO
December __, 1992*	at Butler	L 60–91	1–7	Hinkle Fieldhouse (900); Indianapolis, IN
December __, 1992	at Rider	L 61–99	1–8 (0–1)	Alumni Gymnasium (1,271); Lawrenceville, NJ
December __, 1993	Mount St. Mary's	L 71–83	1–9 (0–2)	Generoso Pope Athletic Complex (300); Brooklyn, NY
January 9, 1993	Monmouth	L 61–67	1–10 (0–3)	Generoso Pope Athletic Complex (200); Brooklyn, NY
January __, 1993	Wagner	L 73–78	1–11 (0–4)	Generoso Pope Athletic Complex (250); Brooklyn, NY
January __, 1993	at Fairleigh Dickinson	L 62–65	1–12 (0–5)	Rothman Center (814); Hackensack, NJ
January __, 1993	at Marist	L 72–77	1–13 (0–6)	McCann Field House (3,039); Poughkeepsie, NY
January __, 1993	Saint Francis (PA)	W 81–77	2–13 (1–6)	Generoso Pope Athletic Complex (300); Brooklyn, NY
January 28, 1993	Long Island; Battle of Brooklyn	W 107–98	3–13 (2–6)	Generoso Pope Athletic Complex (350); Brooklyn, NY
January __, 1993	Robert Morris	W 78–77	4–13 (3–6)	Generoso Pope Athletic Complex (290); Brooklyn, NY
February __, 1993	at Mount St. Mary's	W 76–72	5–13 (4–6)	Knott Arena (2,299); Emmitsburg, MD
February __, 1993	Rider	W 102–78	6–13 (5–6)	Generoso Pope Athletic Complex (350); Brooklyn, NY
February __, 1993	at Wagner	L 78–81	6–14 (5–7)	Sutter Gymnasium (1,050); Brooklyn, NY
February 11, 1993	at Monmouth	L 70–85	6–15 (5–8)	William T. Boylan Gymnasium (674); West Long Branch, NJ
February __, 1993	Marist	L 77–89	6–16 (5–9)	Generoso Pope Athletic Complex (400); Brooklyn, NY
February __, 1993	Fairleigh Dickinson	W 84–83	7–16 (6–9)	Generoso Pope Athletic Complex (500); Brooklyn, NY
February __, 1993	at Robert Morris	L 73–81	7–17 (6–10)	Charles L. Sewall Center (634); Moon Township, PA
February __, 1993	at Saint Francis (PA)	W 71–66	8–17 (7–10)	Maurice Stokes Athletic Center (1,851); Loretto, PA
February __, 1993	at Long Island	W 99–96	9–17 (8–10)	Schwartz Athletic Center (377); Brooklyn, NY
1993 NEC tournament
February __, 1993	at Mount St. Mary's; Quarterfinal	L 78–81 ^{OT}	9–18	Knott Arena (950); Emmitsburg, MD
*Non-conference game. ^{#}Rankings from AP Poll. (#) Tournament seedings in parentheses. All times are in Eastern Time.
