= 1992 Northeast Conference men's basketball tournament =

- Classification: Division I
- Season: 1991–92
- Teams: 9
- Finals site: Charles L. Sewall Center; Moon Township, PA
- Champions: Robert Morris (5th title)
- Winning coach: Jarrett Durham (3rd title)
- MVP: Myron Walker (RMU)

1991–92 Northeast Conference men's basketball standings
	Conf.				Overall
Team	W		L	PCT	W		L	PCT
Robert Morris†	12	–	4	.750	19	–	12	.613
Monmouth	11	–	5	.688	20	–	9	.690
Fairleigh Dickinson	11	–	5	.688	14	–	14	.500
Wagner	9	–	7	.563	16	–	12	.571
St. Francis (NY)	8	–	8	.500	15	–	14	.517
Long Island	7	–	9	.438	11	–	18	.379
Marist	6	–	10	.375	10	–	20	.333
Saint Francis (PA)	5	–	11	.313	13	–	16	.448
Mount St. Mary's	3	–	13	.188	6	–	22	.214
† 1992 NEC tournament winner

The 1992 Northeast Conference men's basketball tournament was held in March. The tournament featured the league's nine teams, seeded based on their conference record. Robert Morris won the championship, their fifth, and received the conference's automatic bid to the 1992 NCAA Tournament.

== Format ==
The NEC Men's Basketball Tournament consisted of a nine-team playoff format with all games played at the venue of the higher seed. The first round was played by the two lowest seeds and the other teams received a bye.

The winner of this first-round matchup advanced to the quarterfinals to face the top-seeded team in a standard eight-team, single-elimination bracket.

== Bracket ==
First round
8	Saint Francis (PA)	85
9	Mount St. Mary's	79

Quarterfinals
1	Robert Morris	83
8	St. Francis (PA)	66
4	Wagner	73
5	St. Francis (NY)	74
3	Fairleigh Dickinson	60
6	Long Island	77
2	Monmouth	60
7	Marist	75

Semifinals
1	Robert Morris	70
5	St. Francis (NY)	68
6	Long Island	91
7	Marist	92^{3OT}

Championship Game
1	Robert Morris	85
7	Marist	81

== All-tournament team ==
Tournament MVP in bold.

**1992 NEC All-Tournament Team**

**Myron Walker**, RMU
Charles Hatcher, SFBK
Wade Timmerson, RMU
Andy Lake, MAR
Izett Buchanan, MAR
Joe Griffin, LIU
