= 1993 Northeast Conference men's basketball tournament =

- Classification: Division I
- Season: 1992–93
- Teams: 10
- Finals site: Alumni Gymnasium; Lawrenceville, NJ
- Champions: Rider (1st title)
- Winning coach: Kevin Bannon (1st title)
- MVP: Darrick Suber (Rider)
- Television: ESPN

The 1993 Northeast Conference men's basketball tournament was played from March 2–5, 1993 at campus sites of the higher seeded teams. The tournament featured the league's ten teams, seeded based on their conference record. Rider won their first ever championship with a thrilling last second shot by Darrick Suber, defeating Wagner 65–64, and received the conference's automatic bid to the 1993 NCAA Tournament.

1992–93 Northeast Conference men's basketball standings
| | Conf. | | | | Overall |
| Team | W | | L | PCT | W | | L | PCT |
|---|---|---|---|---|---|---|---|---|
| Rider † | 14 | – | 4 | .778 | 19 | – | 11 | .633 |
| Wagner | 12 | – | 6 | .667 | 18 | – | 12 | .600 |
| Mount St. Mary's | 10 | – | 8 | .556 | 14 | – | 16 | .467 |
| Marist | 10 | – | 8 | .556 | 14 | – | 16 | .467 |
| Fairleigh Dickinson | 8 | – | 10 | .444 | 11 | – | 17 | .393 |
| St. Francis Brooklyn | 8 | – | 10 | .444 | 9 | – | 18 | .333 |
| Saint Francis (PA) | 7 | – | 11 | .389 | 9 | – | 18 | .333 |
| Robert Morris | 7 | – | 11 | .389 | 9 | – | 18 | .333 |
| Long Island | 7 | – | 11 | .389 | 9 | – | 18 | .333 |
| Monmouth | 7 | – | 11 | .389 | 11 | – | 17 | .393 |
† 1993 NEC tournament winner

== Format ==
The NEC Men's Basketball Tournament consisted of a ten-team playoff format with all games played at the venue of the higher seed. The first round was played by the four lowest seeds (7–10) and the other teams received a bye.

== Bracket ==
First round Tuesday, March 2, 1993
8 | Robert Morris | 77
9 | Long Island | 80
7 | Saint Francis (PA) | 80
10 | Monmouth | 91

Quarterfinals; Wednesday, March 3, 1993
1 | Rider | 92
9 | Long Island | 85
4 | Marist | 62
5 | Fairleigh Dickinson | 81
3 | Mount St. Mary's | 81
6 | St. Francis Brooklyn | 78^{OT}
2 | Wagner | 75
10 | Monmouth | 66

Semifinals; Thursday, March 4, 1993
1 | Rider | 93
5 | Fairleigh Dickinson | 63
2 | Wagner | 65
3 | Mount St. Mary's | 48

Championship Game; Friday, March 5, 1993; ESPN
1 | Rider | 65
2 | Wagner | 64

== All-tournament team ==
Tournament MVP in bold.

**1993 NEC All-Tournament Team**

**Darrick Suber**, RU
Miladin Mutavdzic, WC
Chris McGuthrie, MSM
Bobby Hopson, WC
Chris Mikola, RU
Steve Wriedt, MU
