= 1991–92 St. Francis Terriers men's basketball team =

American college basketball season

1991–92 St. Francis Terriers men's basketball
- Conference: Northeast Conference
- Record: 15–14 (8–8 NEC)
- Head coach: Ron Ganulin (1st season)
- Assistant coach: Glenn Braica (3rd season)
- Home arena: Generoso Pope Athletic Complex

1991–92 Northeast Conference men's basketball standings
	Conf.				Overall
Team	W		L	PCT	W		L	PCT
Robert Morris†	12	–	4	.750	19	–	12	.613
Monmouth	11	–	5	.688	20	–	9	.690
Fairleigh Dickinson	11	–	5	.688	14	–	14	.500
Wagner	9	–	7	.563	16	–	12	.571
St. Francis (NY)	8	–	8	.500	15	–	14	.517
Long Island	7	–	9	.438	11	–	18	.379
Marist	6	–	10	.375	10	–	20	.333
Saint Francis (PA)	5	–	11	.313	13	–	16	.448
Mount St. Mary's	3	–	13	.188	6	–	22	.214
† 1992 NEC tournament winner

The 1991–92 St. Francis Terriers men's basketball team represented St. Francis College during the 1991–92 NCAA Division I men's basketball season. The team was coached by Ron Ganulin, who was in his first year at the helm of the St. Francis Terriers. The Terrier's home games were played at the Generoso Pope Athletic Complex. The team has been a member of the Northeast Conference since 1981.

The Terriers finished their season at 15–14 overall and 8–8 in conference play.

== Roster ==
1991–92 St. Francis Brooklyn Terriers men's basketball team
Players
Coaches

Pos.	#	Name	Height	Weight	Year	Previous school	Hometown
C		Lester James	6 ft 7 in (2.01 m)	—	Sr
G		Lynn Smith	6 ft 3 in (1.91 m)	—	Sr
G		John Arnold	6 ft 0 in (1.83 m)	—	Sr
F		Brian Jones	6 ft 4 in (1.93 m)	—	Sr
F		Allen West	6 ft 5 in (1.96 m)	—	Sr
G		Steve Caricato	6 ft 0 in (1.83 m)	—	Sr
C		Thomas Johnson	6 ft 11 in (2.11 m)	—	Sr
G		Charles Hatcher	6 ft 2 in (1.88 m)	—	Jr
F		Ron Arnold	6 ft 6 in (1.98 m)	—	Jr	Rice High School	New York, NY
G		Louis Myers	6 ft 2 in (1.88 m)	—	Jr
G		Keith Long	6 ft 0 in (1.83 m)	—	Jr
G		Kevin Davis	6 ft 4 in (1.93 m)	—	So
F		Chris Ortiz	6 ft 5 in (1.96 m)	—	Fr

Head coach

- Ron Ganulin (LIU Brooklyn '67)

Assistant coach(es)

- Glenn Braica (Queens College '89)

Legend

- (C) Team captain
- (S) Suspended
- (I) Ineligible
- (W) Walk-on
- Injured
- Current redshirt

== Schedule and results ==
Date time, TV	Opponent	Result	Record	Site (attendance) city, state
Regular season
November 22, 1991*	at No. 9 Seton Hall	L 78–99	0–1	Izod Center (3,200); East Rutherford, NJ
November 26, 1991*	at Niagara	L 50–79	0–2	Gallagher Center (1,047); Lewiston, NY
November 29, 1991*	vs. Delaware	L 67–80	0–3	The Venue at UCF (900); Orlando, FL
November 30, 1991*	vs. Campbell	W 78–76	1–3	The Venue at UCF (800); Orlando, FL
December 6, 1991*	vs. Penn State; First Bank Classic	L 51–61	1–4	Bradley Center (600); Milwaukee, WI
December 7, 1991*	vs. Columbia; First Bank Classic	W 62–59	2–4	Bradley Center (600); Milwaukee, WI
December __, 1991*	at Brooklyn	W 73–69	3–4	(700); Brooklyn, NY
December __, 1991*	Hofstra	L 60–91	3–5	Generoso Pope Athletic Complex (350); Brooklyn, NY
December __, 1991	Long Island	W 83–73	4–5 (1–0)	Generoso Pope Athletic Complex (350); Brooklyn, NY
December __, 1991*	Colgate	W 79–71	5–5	Generoso Pope Athletic Complex (350); Brooklyn, NY
December __, 1991*	Brooklyn	W 83–71	6–5	Generoso Pope Athletic Complex (200); Brooklyn, NY
December __, 1991	at Mount St. Mary's	W 65–64	7–5 (2–0)	Knott Arena; Emmitsburg, MD
January 16, 1992	at Monmouth	L 40–62	7–6 (2–1)	William T. Boylan Gymnasium; West Long Branch, NJ
January __, 1992	at Wagner	L 75–82	7–7 (2–2)	Sutter Gymnasium (894); Brooklyn, NY
January __, 1992	Fairleigh Dickinson	L 82–87 ^{2OT}	7–8 (2–3)	Generoso Pope Athletic Complex (350); Brooklyn, NY
January __, 1992	Marist	L 59–66	7–9 (2–4)	Generoso Pope Athletic Complex (350); Brooklyn, NY
January __, 1992	at Saint Francis (PA)	W 79–67	8–9 (3–4)	Maurice Stokes Athletic Center (1,957); Loretto, PA
January 27, 1992	at Robert Morris	L 46–64	8–10 (3–5)	Charles L. Sewall Center (861); Moon Township, PA
February __, 1992	Mount St. Mary's	W 97–83	9–10 (4–5)	Generoso Pope Athletic Complex (300); Brooklyn, NY
February 8, 1992	at Long Island; Battle of Brooklyn	W 97–94	10–10 (5–5)	Schwartz Athletic Center (587); Brooklyn, NY
February __, 1992*	at Vermont	W 75–71	11–10	Patrick Gym (1,185); Burlington, VT
February __, 1992	Wagner	L 74–78	11–11 (5–6)	Generoso Pope Athletic Complex (400); Brooklyn, NY
February 15, 1992	Monmouth	L 64–65	11–12 (5–7)	Generoso Pope Athletic Complex (300); Brooklyn, NY
February __, 1992	at Marist	W 69–66	12–12 (6–7)	McCann Field House (2,462); Poughkeepsie, NY
February __, 1992	Fairleigh Dickinson	W 85–77	13–12 (7–7)	Rothman Center (1,022); Hackensack, NJ
February 27, 1992	Robert Morris	W 84–68	14–12 (8–7)	Generoso Pope Athletic Complex; Brooklyn, NY
February __, 1992	Saint Francis (PA)	L 71–74	14–13 (8–8)	Generoso Pope Athletic Complex (300); Brooklyn, NY
1992 NEC tournament
February __, 1992	at Wagner; Quarterfinal	W 74–73	15–13	Sutter Gymnasium (1,578); Brooklyn, NY
February __, 1992	at Robert Morris; Semifinal	L 68–70	15–14	Charles L. Sewall Center (828); Moon Township, PA
*Non-conference game. ^{#}Rankings from AP Poll. (#) Tournament seedings in parentheses. All times are in Eastern Time.
