= 1992–93 Rider Broncs men's basketball team =

American college basketball season

1992–93 Rider Broncs men's basketball
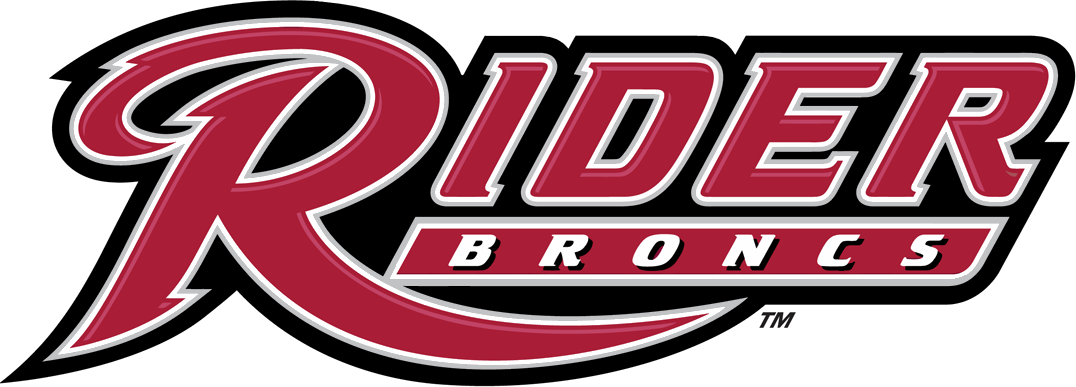

NEC regular-season champions NEC tournament champions

NCAA tournament, first round
- Conference: Northeast Conference
- Record: 19–11 (14–4 ECC)
- Head coach: Kevin Bannon
- Home arena: Alumni Gymnasium

1992–93 Northeast Conference men's basketball standings
	Conf.				Overall
Team	W		L	PCT	W		L	PCT
Rider †	14	–	4	.778	19	–	11	.633
Wagner	12	–	6	.667	18	–	12	.600
Mount St. Mary's	10	–	8	.556	14	–	16	.467
Marist	10	–	8	.556	14	–	16	.467
Fairleigh Dickinson	8	–	10	.444	11	–	17	.393
St. Francis Brooklyn	8	–	10	.444	9	–	18	.333
Saint Francis (PA)	7	–	11	.389	9	–	18	.333
Robert Morris	7	–	11	.389	9	–	18	.333
Long Island	7	–	11	.389	9	–	18	.333
Monmouth	7	–	11	.389	11	–	17	.393
† 1993 NEC tournament winner

The 1992–93 Rider Broncs men's basketball team represented Rider University in the 1992–93 NCAA Division I men's basketball season. The Broncs, led by head coach Kevin Bannon, played their home games at the Alumni Gymnasium in Lawrenceville, New Jersey as members of the Northeast Conference. They finished the season 19–11, 14–4 in NEC play to finish atop the conference standings. In the NEC tournament, they defeated No. 9 seed Long Island, No. 5 seed Fairleigh Dickinson, and No. 2 seed Wagner to win the tournament and earn an automatic bid to the NCAA tournament. As the No. 16 seed in the Southeast region of the 1993 NCAA tournament, the Broncs were defeated by No. 1 seed and eventual Final Four participant Kentucky, 96–52, in the opening round.

== Roster ==
1992–93 Rider Broncs men's basketball team
Players	Coaches
Pos. / # / Name / Height / Weight / Year / Previous school / Hometown; G / 4 / Darrick Suber / 6 ft 4 in (1.93 m) / — / Sr	Head coach: Kevin Bannon (Saint Peter's); Assistant coach(es) Legend: (C) Team captain; (S) Suspended; (I) Ineligible; (W) Walk-on; Injured; Current redshirt; Roster

== Schedule and results ==
Date time, TV	Rank^{#}	Opponent^{#}	Result	Record	Site (attendance) city, state
Regular season
Dec 1, 1992*		at No. 7 Seton Hall	L 74–87	0–1	Brendan Byrne Arena (3,200); East Rutherford, New Jersey
Dec 8, 1992*		at Lafayette	W 72–56	1–1	Kirby Sports Center (1,432); Easton, Massachusetts
Dec 21, 1992*		at Army	L 64–69	1–2	Christl Arena (940); West Point, New York
Dec 28, 1992*		vs. Bowling Green; Music City Invitational	L 62–68	1–3	Memorial Gymnasium (5,838); Nashville, Tennessee
Dec 29, 1992*		vs. Air Force; Music City Invitational	L 66–75	1–4	Memorial Gymnasium (9,130); Nashville, Tennessee
Jan 2, 1993*		Niagara	L 82–94	1–5	Alumni Gymnasium (1,625); Lawrenceville, New Jersey
Jan 5, 1993		St. Francis (NY)	W 99–61	2–5 (1–0)	Alumni Gymnasium (1,271); Lawrenceville, New Jersey
Jan 7, 1993		at Long Island	W 62–59	3–5 (2–0)	Schwartz Athletic Center (-); Brooklyn, New York
Jan 9, 1993		Marist	W 83–73	4–5 (3–0)	Alumni Gymnasium (1,583); Lawrenceville, New Jersey
Jan 11, 1993		at Fairleigh Dickinson	L 63–73	4–6 (3–1)	Rothman Center (1,011); Hackensack, New Jersey
Jan 14, 1993; 7:30 p.m.		at Robert Morris	W 68–59	5–6 (4–1)	Charles L. Sewall Center (1,008); Moon Township, Pennsylvania
Jan 16, 1993		at Saint Francis (PA)	W 73–68	6–6 (5–1)	Maurice Stokes Athletic Center (-); Loretto, Pennsylvania
Jan 19, 1993*		Brown	W 82–70	7–6	Alumni Gymnasium (1,428); Lawrenceville, New Jersey
Jan 23, 1993		at Mount St. Mary's	L 55–62	7–7 (5–2)	Knott Arena (3,260); Emmitsburg, Maryland
Jan 28, 1993		Monmouth	W 85–64	8–7 (6–2)	Alumni Gymnasium (1,268); Lawrenceville, New Jersey
Jan 30, 1993; 7:30 p.m.		at Wagner	W 71–67	9–7 (7–2)	Sutter Gymnasium (1,090); Brooklyn, New York
Feb 1, 1993*		at Bucknell	L 76–78	9–8	Davis Gym (2,500); Lewisburg, Pennsylvania
Feb 4, 1993		Long Island	W 84–76	10–8 (8–2)	Alumni Gymnasium (-); Lawrenceville, New Jersey
Feb 6, 1993		at St. Francis (NY)	L 78–102	10–9 (8–3)	Generoso Pope Athletic Complex (350); Brooklyn, New York
Feb 9, 1993		Fairleigh Dickinson	W 68–58	11–9 (9–3)	Alumni Gymnasium (-); Lawrenceville, New Jersey
Feb 11, 1993		at Marist	L 65–69	11–10 (9–4)	McCann Field House (2,062); Poughkeepsie, New York
Feb 13, 1993		Saint Francis (PA)	W 67–63	12–10 (10–4)	Alumni Gymnasium (1,375); Lawrenceville, New Jersey
Feb 15, 1993		Robert Morris	W 76–65	13–10 (11–4)	Alumni Gymnasium (1,494); Lawrenceville, New Jersey
Feb 20, 1993		Mount St. Mary's	W 88–71	14–10 (12–4)	Alumni Gymnasium (1,800); Lawrenceville, New Jersey
Feb 25, 1993		Wagner	W 58–54	15–10 (13–4)	Alumni Gymnasium (2,000); Lawrenceville, New Jersey
Feb 27, 1993		at Monmouth	W 79–73	16–10 (14–4)	William T. Boylan Gymnasium (3,122); West Long Branch, New Jersey
NEC tournament
Mar 4, 1993	(1)	(9) Long Island; Quarterfinals	W 92–85	17–10	Alumni Gymnasium (1,750); Lawrenceville, New Jersey
Mar 6, 1993	(1)	(5) Fairleigh Dickinson; Semifinals	W 92–63	18–10	Alumni Gymnasium (2,000); Lawrenceville, New Jersey
Mar 9, 1993; ESPN	(1)	(2) Wagner; Championship Game	W 65–64	19–10	Alumni Gymnasium (2,000); Lawrenceville, New Jersey
NCAA tournament
Mar 19, 1993*	(16 SE)	vs. (1 SE) No. 2 Kentucky; First Round	L 52–96	19–11	Memorial Gymnasium (14,600); Nashville, Tennessee
*Non-conference game. ^{#}Rankings from AP Poll. (#) Tournament seedings in parentheses. SE=Southeast. All times are in Eastern.
