= Kevin Bannon =

American basketball coach

Biographical details
- Born: June 11, 1957 (age 69); Verona, New Jersey, U.S.

Playing career
- 1975–1979: Saint Peter's
- Position: Guard

Coaching career (HC unless noted)
- 1979–1982: Trenton State (asst.)
- 1982–1989: Trenton State
- 1989–1997: Rider
- 1997–2001: Rutgers
- 2008–2010: Notre Dame HS (NJ)

Head coaching record
- Overall: 335–211 (.614) (college); 26–23 (.531) (high school)
- Tournaments: 0–2 (NCAA Division I); 8–4 (NCAA Division III); 1–2 (NIT)

Accomplishments and honors

Championships
- 2 NJAC regular season (1988, 1989); 2 NEC tournament (1993, 1994); 3 NEC regular season (1993–1995)

Awards
- 2x NEC Coach of the Year (1993, 1994)

Kevin Bannon (born June 11, 1957) is a former American men's college basketball head coach who most recently served as head coach at Rutgers University from 1997 through 2001. Prior to that he spent eight years as head coach of Rider University's team and seven more as the coach of Trenton State College.

A native of Verona, New Jersey, Bannon graduated from Verona High School in 1975. He holds a bachelor's degree in management from Saint Peter's College in Jersey City, New Jersey and a master's degree in sports management from Virginia Commonwealth University.

During his tenure at Rutgers, Bannon went 59–60 and failed to make the NCAA Tournament, although he was able to take the Scarlet Knights to the NIT. His only appearances in the NCAA Tournament came during his time at Rider, when he led the team to two consecutive berths by winning the Northeast Conference tournament.

Bannon came under fire toward the end of his tenure at Rutgers regarding an incident in a free throw drill during his first year as coach. Players Earl Johnson and Josh Sankes claimed they were forced to remove clothing for each free throw they missed, and then were forced to run wind sprints while naked. Other players claimed the practice was in fun, and expressed their disappointment that Rutgers and Bannon were being sued because of this. Both players transferred from Rutgers, and Johnson filed a lawsuit against the school, which was later reduced to naming Bannon as one of two co-defendants. The suit had originally been dismissed in 1999, but in 2001 was reinstated.

Bannon has not coached on the collegiate level since his firing at Rutgers and most recently was employed by the Mercer County, New Jersey, Park Commission, until 2016 where he served as its executive director. He was indicted on October 31, 2017, in connection with misuse of public funds and his relationship with the Park District. A resident of the Lawrenceville section of Lawrence Township, Mercer County, New Jersey, he returned to coaching basketball in 2008, acting as the coach for the boys' varsity team at Notre Dame High School in Lawrenceville. He resigned from that position in 2010.

== Head coaching record ==
=== College ===
Record table
Season	Team	Overall	Conference	Standing	Postseason
Trenton State Lions (New Jersey Athletic Conference) (1982–1989)
1982–83	Trenton State	13–11	7–7	T–5th	
1983–84	Trenton State	14–9	?	?	
1984–85	Trenton State	23–6	?	?	NCAA Division III Second Round
1985–86	Trenton State	22–7	?	?	NCAA Division III First Round
1986–87	Trenton State	17–9	12–6	4th	
1987–88	Trenton State	26–4	16–2	T–1st	NCAA Division III Elite Eight
1988–89	Trenton State	30–2	17–1	T–1st	NCAA Division III Runner-up
Trenton State:		145–48 (.751)	52–16 (.765)		
Rider Broncs (East Coast Conference) (1989–1992)
1989–90	Rider	10–18	5–9	8th	
1990–91	Rider	14–16	4–8	T–5th	
1991–92	Rider	16–13	9–3	T–2nd	
Rider Broncs (Northeast Conference) (1992–1997)
1992–93	Rider	19–11	14–4	1st	NCAA Division I First Round
1993–94	Rider	21–9	14–4	1st	NCAA Division I First Round
1994–95	Rider	18–11	13–5	1st	
1995–96	Rider	19–11	12–6	4th	
1996–97	Rider	14–14	10–8	T–4th	
Rider:		131–103 (.560)	81–47 (.633)		
Rutgers Scarlet Knights (Big East Conference) (1997–2001)
1997–98	Rutgers	14–15	6–12	T–5th (BE 7)	
1998–99	Rutgers	19–13	9–9	T–6th	NIT Second Round
1999–00	Rutgers	15–16	6–10	T–8th	NIT First Round
2000–01	Rutgers	11–16	3–13	7th (West)	
Rutgers:		59–60 (.496)	24–44 (.353)		
Total:		335–211 (.614)			
National champion Postseason invitational champion Conference regular season champion Conference regular season and conference tournament champion Division regular season champion Division regular season and conference tournament champion Conference tournament champion
