= 2005–06 St. Francis Terriers men's basketball team =

American college basketball season

2005–06 St. Francis Terriers men's basketball
- Conference: Northeast Conference
- Record: 10–17 (7–11 NEC)
- Head coach: Brian Nash (1st season)
- Assistant coaches: Jim Datka (1st season); Allen Griffin (1st season)
- Home arena: Generoso Pope Athletic Complex

2005–06 Northeast Conference men's basketball standings
	Conf.				Overall
Team	W		L	PCT	W		L	PCT
Fairleigh Dickinson	14	–	4	.778	20	–	12	.625
Central Connecticut	13	–	5	.722	18	–	11	.621
Monmouth †	12	–	6	.667	19	–	15	.559
Mount St. Mary's	11	–	7	.611	13	–	17	.433
Robert Morris	10	–	8	.556	15	–	14	.517
Long Island	9	–	9	.500	12	–	16	.429
Sacred Heart	8	–	10	.444	11	–	17	.393
Quinnipiac	7	–	11	.389	12	–	16	.429
St. Francis (NY)	7	–	11	.389	10	–	17	.370
Wagner	6	–	12	.333	13	–	14	.481
Saint Francis (PA)	2	–	16	.111	4	–	24	.143
† 2006 NEC tournament winner

The 2005–06 St. Francis Terriers men's basketball team represented St. Francis College during the 2005–06 NCAA Division I men's basketball season. The team was coached by Brian Nash, who was in his first year at the helm of the St. Francis Terriers. The Terrier's home games were played at the Generoso Pope Athletic Complex. The team has been a member of the Northeast Conference since 1981.

Nash's team finished at 10–17 overall and 7–11 in conference play for a 9th-place finish. It marks the first time in 15 seasons that the Terriers have not made it to the NEC Conference Tournament.

== Roster ==
2005–06 St. Francis Brooklyn Terriers men's basketball team
Players
Coaches

Pos.	#	Name	Height	Weight	Year	Hometown
G/F	13	Christian Brown	6 ft 4 in (1.93 m)	190 lb (86 kg)	Sr	Manhattan, NY
G	1	Sean Dantzler	6 ft 4 in (1.93 m)	180 lb (82 kg)	Sr	Bronx, NY
F	21	Devon Neckles	6 ft 7 in (2.01 m)	190 lb (86 kg)	Sr	Brooklyn, NY
G	2	Tristan Smith	6 ft 1 in (1.85 m)	185 lb (84 kg)	Sr	Amityville, NY
C	50	Brian Franklyn	6 ft 8 in (2.03 m)	240 lb (109 kg)	Jr	Brooklyn, NY
G	14	Ruandy Melo	6 ft 0 in (1.83 m)	160 lb (73 kg)	Jr	Manhattan, NY
G/F	15	Allan Sheppard	6 ft 5 in (1.96 m)	200 lb (91 kg)	Jr	Manhattan, NY
F/C	20	Lex James	6 ft 9 in (2.06 m)	230 lb (104 kg)	Jr	Brooklyn, NY
G	25	Mensur Radonci	5 ft 11 in (1.8 m)	185 lb (84 kg)	Jr	Bronx, NY
G	42	Nick Jones	6 ft 2 in (1.88 m)	195 lb (88 kg)	So	St. Albans, NY
G/F	34	Nikola Traykov	6 ft 5 in (1.96 m)	205 lb (93 kg)	So	Blagoevgrad, Bulgaria
F	10	Sami Pekkola	6 ft 7 in (2.01 m)	220 lb (100 kg)	So	Lahti, Finland
F	40	James St. Robert	6 ft 8 in (2.03 m)	230 lb (104 kg)	So	Copiague, NY
G	3	Jamaal Womack	5 ft 8 in (1.73 m)	170 lb (77 kg)	Fr	Bronx, NY
F	44	John Gooden	6 ft 6 in (1.98 m)	220 lb (100 kg)	Fr	Bronx, NY

Head coach

- Brian Nash (Keene State '92)

Assistant coach(es)

- Jim Datka (Wisconsin Lutheran '88)
- Allen Griffin (Syracuse '01)

Legend

- (C) Team captain
- (S) Suspended
- (I) Ineligible
- (W) Walk-on
- Injured
- Current redshirt

== Schedule and results ==
Date time, TV	Opponent	Result	Record	Site (attendance) city, state
Exhibition
November 12, 2005*; 4:00 pm	Molloy College	W 88–60	1–0	Generoso Pope Athletic Complex; Brooklyn, NY
Regular Season
November 18, 2005*; 7:00 pm	Fairfield	W 69–64	1–0	Generoso Pope Athletic Complex (926); Brooklyn, NY
November 22, 2005*; 7:30 pm	at St. John's (NY)	L 50–64	1–1	Carnesecca Arena; Queens, NY
November 26, 2005*; 1:00 pm	at Fordham	W 66–60	2–1	Rose Hill Gym (2,270); Bronx, NY
November 29, 2005*; 7:30 pm	at Pittsburgh	L 58–79	2–2	Petersen Events Center (7,263); Pittsburgh, PA
December 3, 2005*; 2:00 pm	Binghamton	L 56–64	2–3	Generoso Pope Athletic Complex (382); Brooklyn, NY
December 6, 2005*; 7:00 pm	at Lafayette	L 81–89 ^{OT}	2–4	Kirby Sports Center (1,224); Easton, PA
December 9, 2005; 7:00 pm	Central Connecticut State	L 61–72	2–5 (0–1)	Generoso Pope Athletic Complex (342); Brooklyn, NY
December 18, 2005*; 2:00 pm	Hartford	W 55–45	3–5	Generoso Pope Athletic Complex (214); Brooklyn, NY
December 22, 2005*; 7:00 pm	Hofstra	L 57–73	3–6	Generoso Pope Athletic Complex (217); Brooklyn, NY
December 30, 2005*; 7:30 pm	at Manhattan	L 78–89	3–7	Draddy Gymnasium (1,752); Bronx, NY
January 3, 2006; 7:00 pm	Monmouth	L 59–66	3–8 (0–2)	Generoso Pope Athletic Complex (211); Brooklyn, NY
January 7, 2006; 4:00 pm	Mount St. Mary's	L 43–60	3–9 (0–3)	Generoso Pope Athletic Complex (263); Brooklyn, NY
January 12, 2006; 7:30 pm	at Robert Morris	L 71–73	3–10 (0–4)	Charles L. Sewall Center (1,123); Moon Township, PA
January 14, 2006; 7:00 pm	at Saint Francis (PA)	W 65–56	4–10 (1–4)	DeGol Arena (1,946); Loretto, PA
January 18, 2006; 7:00 pm	Long Island	W 70–67	5–10 (2–4)	Generoso Pope Athletic Complex (384); Brooklyn, NY
January 20, 2006; 7:00 pm	at Fairleigh Dickinson	L 55–64	5–11 (2–5)	Rothman Center (862); Hackensack, NJ
January 23, 2006; 7:30 pm	at Wagner	L 58–68	5–12 (2–6)	Spiro Sports Center (1,469); Staten Island, NY
January 28, 2006; 4:00 pm	Quinnipiac	W 70–66	6–12 (3–6)	Generoso Pope Athletic Complex (342); Brooklyn, NY
February 2, 2006; 7:00 pm	at Central Connecticut State	L 68–76 ^{OT}	6–13 (3–7)	William H. Detrick Gymnasium (1,812); New Britain, CT
February 4, 2006; 4:00 pm	at Quinnipiac	L 68–73	6–14 (3–8)	Burt Kahn Court (1,297); Hamden, CT
February 9, 2006; 7:00 pm	Wagner	W 57–49	7–14 (4–8)	Generoso Pope Athletic Complex (322); Brooklyn, NY
February 11, 2006; 4:00 pm	Sacred Heart	W 62–58	8–14 (5–8)	Generoso Pope Athletic Complex (306); Brooklyn, NY
February 16, 2006; 7:30 pm	Saint Francis (PA)	W 69–46	9–14 (6–8)	Generoso Pope Athletic Complex (228); Brooklyn, NY
February 18, 2006; 4:00 pm	Robert Morris	W 70–69 ^{OT}	10–14 (7–8)	Generoso Pope Athletic Complex (301); Brooklyn, NY
February 21, 2006; 7:00 pm	Sacred Heart	L 73–81	10–15 (7–9)	William H. Pitt Center (574); Fairfield, CT
February 25, 2006; 7:00 pm	Monmouth	L 68–74	10–16 (7–10)	William T. Boylan Gymnasium (2,247); West Long Branch, NJ
February 27, 2006; 7:00 pm	at Long Island; Battle of Brooklyn	L 64–67	10–17 (7–11)	Wellness, Recreation & Athletics Center (2,000); Brooklyn, NY
*Non-conference game. ^{#}Rankings from AP Poll. (#) Tournament seedings in parentheses.
