= King Rice =

American basketball player and coach

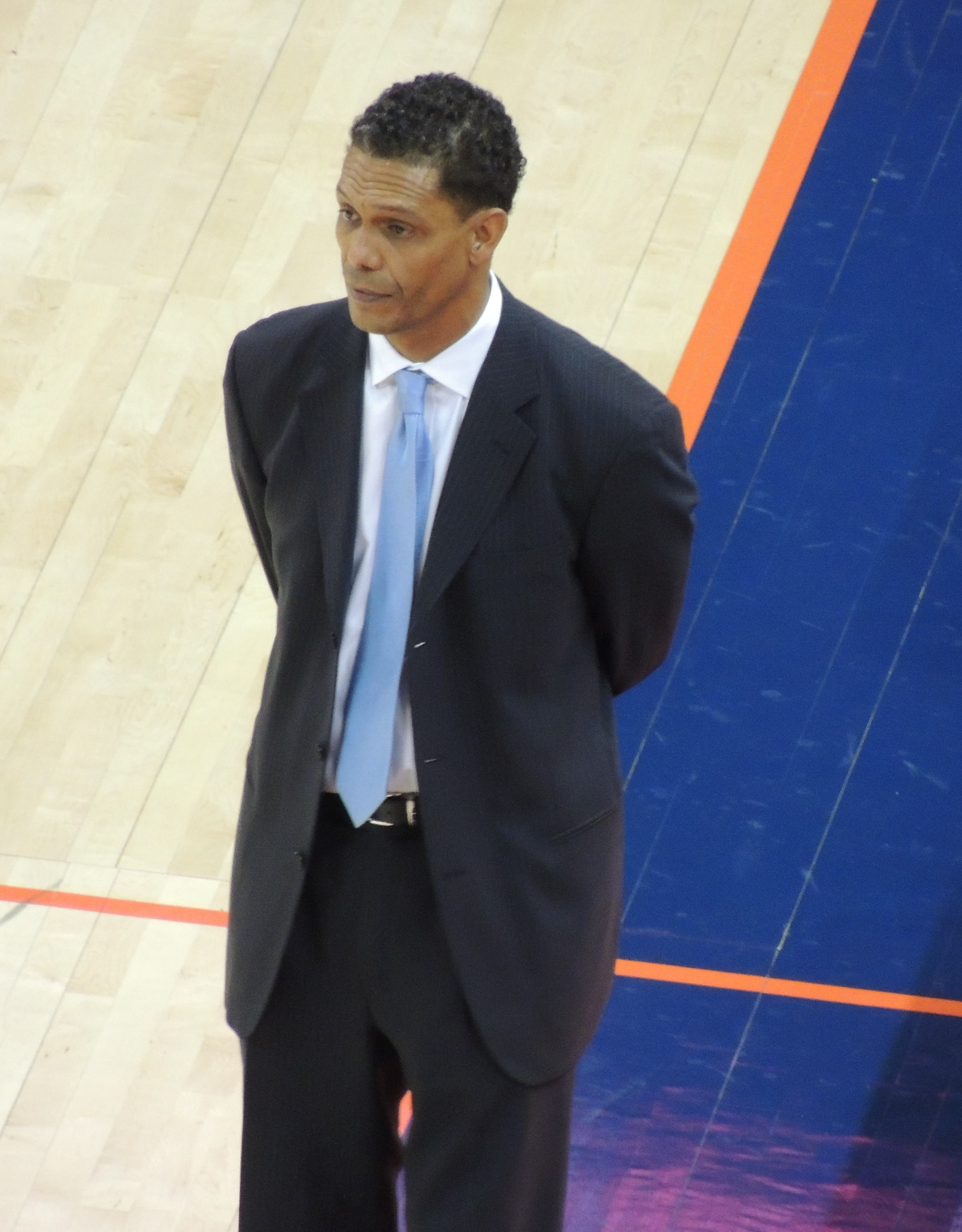
- Rice on the sidelines in a 2017 game

Current position
- Title: Head coach
- Team: Monmouth
- Conference: CAA
- Record: 240–247 (.493)

Biographical details
- Born: December 14, 1968 (age 57); Binghamton, New York, U.S.

Playing career
- 1987–1991: North Carolina
- Position: Point guard

Coaching career (HC unless noted)
- 1992–1993: Oregon (assistant)
- 1993–1998: Illinois State (assistant)
- 1998–2000: Providence (assistant)
- 2001–2004: Bahamas men's team
- 2006–2011: Vanderbilt (assistant)
- 2011–present: Monmouth

Head coaching record
- Overall: 240–247 (.493)
- Tournaments: 1–2 (NIT)

Accomplishments and honors

Championships
- 3× MAAC regular season champion (2016, 2017, 2021)

Awards
- Fourth-team Parade All-American (1986); Second-team Parade All-American (1987); Co-Mr. New York Basketball (1987); McDonald's All-American (1987); 3× MAAC Coach of the Year (2016, 2017, 2021)

King David Rice (born December 14, 1968) is an American basketball coach and former player. He is the head men's basketball coach at Monmouth University. Rice replaced Dave Calloway as head coach of the Hawks on March 29, 2011. Previously, Rice was also the head coach of the Bahamas national basketball team from 2001 to 2004. He is a native of Binghamton, New York, where he attended Binghamton High School from 1983 to 1987, and helped lead the basketball team to two state championships. He then starred at the University of North Carolina before becoming a coach.

== High school career ==
Rice is a native of Binghamton, New York, where he attended Binghamton High School from 1983 to 1987, and helped lead the basketball team to its only two and back-to-back New York State Championships, as a point guard in 1984–85 and 1985–86 seasons, Southern Tier Athletic Conference (STAC) Championship and New York State Section IV Championships the last three years. Rice was also the starting tailback on Binghamton high school's only state championship football team in 1985. Binghamton finished fourth in the USA Today high school basketball ranking in 1985–86, while the football team finished 17th that same year. Rice received both local and state honors as a starter on both of those teams.

In 1986, he earned the honor of being named Parade All-American 4th Team. In 1987, he was named Parade All-American 2nd Team, New York Mr. Basketball, as well as being named a McDonald's High School All-American.

== College career ==
Rice played point guard with the University of North Carolina Tar Heels men's basketball team under coach Dean Smith from the 1987–88 season until the 1990–91 season. He played in 140 games finishing his career with 629 assists, which places him at sixth most all-time for the Tar Heels, and 22nd all-time for the Atlantic Coast Conference (ACC) after the 2021–22 season. These teams made it to the NCAA tournament Elite 8 in 1988 and the Sweet 16 in 1989 and 1990. In the 1990–91 season, holding the title of co-team captain along with Pete Chilcutt and Rick Fox, he helped the Tar Heels to a record of 29–6, reaching the 1991 NCAA men's Final Four. He was a part of the 1989 and 1991 ACC tournament championship teams. After his college basketball career, he went on to earn his bachelor's degree in Communications in 1992.

== Head coaching record ==
Record table
| Season | Team | Overall | Conference | Standing | Postseason |
|---|---|---|---|---|---|
Monmouth Hawks (Northeast Conference) (2011–2013)
| 2011–12 | Monmouth | 12–20 | 10–8 | T–5th | |
| 2012–13 | Monmouth | 10–21 | 5–13 | T–10th | |
Monmouth Hawks (Metro Atlantic Athletic Conference) (2013–2022)
| 2013–14 | Monmouth | 11–21 | 5–15 | 9th | |
| 2014–15 | Monmouth | 18–15 | 13–7 | T–3rd | |
| 2015–16 | Monmouth | 28–8 | 17–3 | 1st | NIT Second Round |
| 2016–17 | Monmouth | 27–7 | 18–2 | 1st | NIT First Round |
| 2017–18 | Monmouth | 11–20 | 7–11 | T–7th | |
| 2018–19 | Monmouth | 14–21 | 10–8 | 6th | |
| 2019–20 | Monmouth | 18–13 | 12–8 | T–3rd | |
| 2020–21 | Monmouth | 12–8 | 12–6 | 1st | |
| 2021–22 | Monmouth | 21–13 | 11–9 | 4th | |
Monmouth Hawks (Colonial Athletic Association) (2022–2023)
| 2022–23 | Monmouth | 7–26 | 5–13 | T–12th | |
Monmouth Hawks (Coastal Athletic Association) (2023–present)
| 2023–24 | Monmouth | 18–15 | 10–8 | T–6th | |
| 2024–25 | Monmouth | 13–20 | 10–8 | T–5th | |
| 2025–26 | Monmouth | 19–15 | 11–7 | 4th | |
| 2026–27 | Monmouth | 1–4 | 0–0 | | |
| Monmouth: | | 240–247 (.493) | 156–126 (.553) | | |
| Total: | | 240–247 (.493) | | | |
National champion Postseason invitational champion Conference regular season champion Conference regular season and conference tournament champion Division regular season champion Division regular season and conference tournament champion Conference tournament champion
