= Darrick Suber =

American basketball player (born c.1971)

Personal information
- Born: c. 1971
- Listed height: 6 ft 4 in (1.93 m)

Career information
- High school: Schenley (Pittsburgh, Pennsylvania)
- College: Rider (1989–1993)
- NBA draft: 1993: undrafted
- Position: Shooting guard

Career highlights
- Honorable mention All-American – AP (1993); NEC Player of the Year (1993); First-team All-NEC (1993); ECC All-Rookie Team (1990); NEC tournament MVP (1993); ECC tournament MVP (1991); No. 4 retired by Rider Broncs

Darrick Suber (born c. 1971) is an American former basketball player. He had a standout college career at Rider University in which he was the 1993 Northeast Conference Player of the Year. He was the first 2,000-point scorer in Rider history, and his game-winning shot in the 1993 Northeast Conference men's basketball tournament championship propelled the Broncs to their second-ever NCAA Tournament.

== Playing career ==
=== High school ===
Suber grew up in Pittsburgh, Pennsylvania and attended Schenley High School. He starred there, leading the entire city in scoring his senior year en route to being named the Pittsburgh City League Player of the Year. Despite his success he was only offered one NCAA Division I scholarship to play basketball, by St. Francis in Brooklyn, New York.

=== College ===
==== Unplanned pivot to Rider ====
In August 1989, Suber arrived at St. Francis in advance of his freshman year at school. His mother had driven him, and upon their arrival, she was unimpressed with the school's basketball facilities and overall student living situation. She said, "To this day I don't believe there was electricity in the building Darrick was supposed to live in." She told Darrick that he was not allowed to stay at St. Francis, and that he would have to stay in the Pittsburgh area for college and that he would go for academic purposes.

That same night, Darrick Suber called a good friend named William Kinsel, whom Suber had met playing basketball in Pittsburgh, and who happened to be an incoming freshman on the Rider basketball team. He asked for Rider head coach Kevin Bannon's phone number to explain his situation, hoping that a cold call would convince Bannon to meet Suber in person to consider offering him an athletic scholarship. Bannon accepted and met with Darrick and his mother the next day, after the Subers drove to Lawrence Township, New Jersey, the home of Rider University. The Subers spent the night there, and Darrick's mother approved of both the campus and the coach; likewise, Bannon had interest in offering his lone remaining scholarship to Darrick. Darrick officially enrolled at Rider before the start of the school year and began his four-year Rider career.

==== Record-setting career ====
For the four years spanning between 1989–90 and 1992–93, Suber etched his names into the Rider men's basketball record book. He started off with a strong freshman season in which he averaged 13.0 points per game, which led the Broncs and helped them finish with a 10–18 overall record, besting the previous season's 5–23 mark. Darrick was named to the East Coast Conference All-Rookie Team. Suber's next season saw his scoring average jump to 18.2 points per game as the Broncs finished with an improved 14–16 overall record, including a runner-up finish in the 1991 East Coast Conference tournament. Darrick was named the ECC tournament's MVP.

Suber's junior season was Rider's final one as members of the ECC. He once again upped his scoring average, to 22.8 per game while also chipping in 3.3 rebounds, 2.9 assists, and 1.6 steals. He was named Rider's team MVP for the second straight season as the Broncs went 16–13 overall. He surpassed 1,000 career points during the season and finished his third year with 1,554.

==== Senior year / "The Shot" ====
In 1992–93, Suber's senior year, Rider switched NCAA conferences and became members of the Northeast Conference. The Broncs, led by Suber's 22.2 points per game, went 14–4 in NEC play and won both the regular season and NEC tournament championships. Darrick was named the NEC tournament MVP, the All-NEC First Team, and became the first Rider player selected as the NEC Player of the Year. During the NEC tournament championship game against Wagner, Suber made the most famous basket in Rider men's basketball history, dubbed "The Shot" by the media. With Wagner leading by one point and only seconds remaining in the game, Suber made an end-to-end drive and shot a 12-foot, game-winning basket at the buzzer, live on ESPN, that sent the sold out Alumni Gym crowd into a frenzy and sent Rider to its second-ever NCAA championship field of 64. It is a replay that is shown every March during the NCAA Division I tournament broadcast compilations of buzzer-beaters which helped propel teams into the national tournament.

For his career, Suber scored 2,219 points, a record that stands through the 2022–23 season. His 665 points during 1992–93 stood as Rider's single season record until Jason Thompson scored 694 in 2007–08. Suber became the first men's basketball player to have a jersey number retired at Rider (later joined by Thompson).

== Later life ==
Suber did not get selected in the 1993 NBA draft, nor did he get any serious consideration to make a team's training camp roster. He eventually went into corporate America and has held various roles in both the Philadelphia, Pennsylvania and Seattle, Washington metropolitan areas since 2007. As of 2017 he was working as the Director of Marketing at Redapt Inc. in Redmond, Washington.

== See also ==
- List of NCAA Division I men's basketball career scoring leaders
