= 2007–08 Mount St. Mary's Mountaineers men's basketball team =

American college basketball season

2007–08 Mount St. Mary's Mountaineers men's basketball
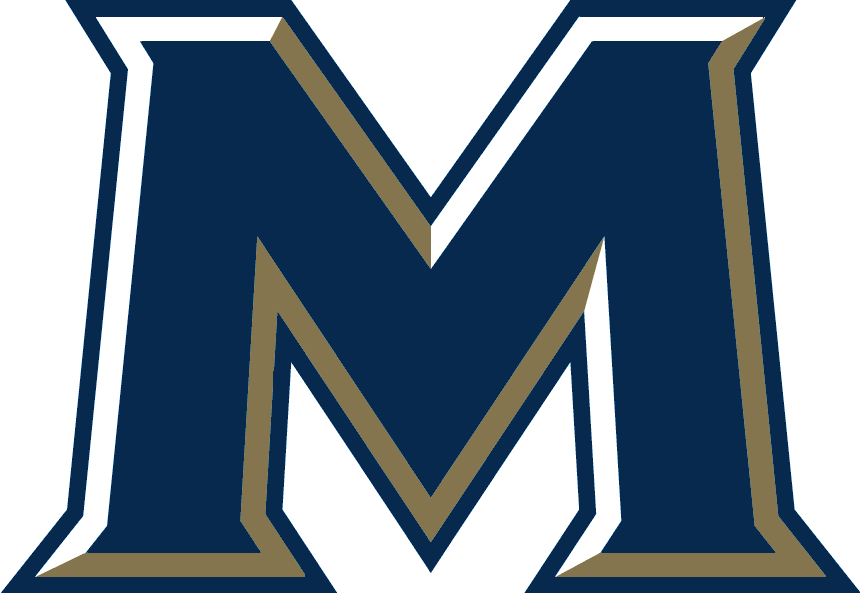

NEC tournament champions

NCAA tournament, first round
- Conference: Northeast Conference
- Record: 19–15 (11–7 NEC)
- Head coach: Milan Brown
- Home arena: Knott Arena

2007–08 Northeast Conference men's basketball standings
	Conf.				Overall
Team	W		L	PCT	W		L	PCT
Robert Morris	16	–	2	.889	26	–	8	.765
Wagner	15	–	3	.833	23	–	8	.742
Sacred Heart	13	–	5	.722	18	–	14	.563
Mount St. Mary's †	11	–	7	.611	19	–	15	.559
Quinnipiac	11	–	7	.611	15	–	15	.500
Central Connecticut	10	–	8	.556	14	–	16	.467
Long Island	7	–	11	.389	15	–	15	.500
Monmouth	4	–	14	.222	7	–	24	.226
Fairleigh Dickinson	4	–	14	.222	8	–	20	.286
St. Francis (NY)	4	–	14	.222	7	–	22	.241
Saint Francis (PA)	4	–	14	.222	6	–	23	.207
† 2008 NEC tournament winner

The 2007–08 Mount St. Mary's Mountaineers men's basketball team represented Mount St. Mary's University during the 2007–08 NCAA Division I men's basketball season. The Mountaineers, led by head coach Milan Brown, played their home games at Knott Arena and were members of the Northeast Conference. They finished the season 19–15, 11–7 in NEC play to finish in a tie for fourth place. They were champions of the NEC tournament to earn an automatic bid to the NCAA tournament. After defeating Coppin State in the Play-in Game, the Mountaineers lost to No. 1 seed North Carolina in the Round of 64.

== Roster ==
2007–08 Mount St. Mary's Mountaineers men's basketball team
Players
Coaches

Pos.	#	Name	Height	Weight	Year	Hometown
G	0	Jean Cajou	6 ft 3 in (1.91 m)	180 lb (82 kg)	Fr	Fairfax, Virginia
G	1	Jeremy Goode	5 ft 9 in (1.75 m)	170 lb (77 kg)	So	Charlotte, North Carolina
G	2	Chris Vann	6 ft 1 in (1.85 m)	195 lb (88 kg)	Sr	Woodbridge, Virginia
G	11	Will Holland	6 ft 4 in (1.93 m)	215 lb (98 kg)	So	Houston, Texas
F	40	Sam Atupem	6 ft 7 in (2.01 m)	240 lb (109 kg)	Jr	Newport News, Virginia

Head coach

- Milan Brown

Assistant coach(es)

Legend

- (C) Team captain
- (S) Suspended
- (I) Ineligible
- (W) Walk-on
- Injured
- Current redshirt

== Schedule and results ==
Date time, TV	Rank^{#}	Opponent^{#}	Result	Record	Site (attendance) city, state
Regular season
Nov 10, 2007*		at George Washington	L 62–77	0–1	Charles E. Smith Center (3,644); Washington, D.C.
Nov 17, 2007*		La Salle	L 63–66	0–2	Knott Arena (1,238); Emmitsburg, Maryland
Nov 24, 2007*		at James Madison	L 73–85	0–3	JMU Convocation Center (2,563); Harrisonburg, Virginia
Nov 26, 2007*		American	L 45–66	0–4	Knott Arena (958); Emmitsburg, Maryland
Dec 1, 2007*		Loyola (MD)	W 70–58	1–4	Knott Arena (2,109); Emmitsburg, Maryland
Dec 3, 2007*		at Navy	W 62–58	2–4	Alumni Hall (1,092); Annapolis, Maryland
Dec 6, 2007		Long Island	W 73–55	3–4 (1–0)	Knott Arena (425); Emmitsburg, Maryland
Dec 8, 2007		at Central Connecticut	W 60–59	4–4 (2–0)	Detrick Gymnasium (1,102); New Britain, Connecticut
Dec 15, 2007*		at Maine	W 66–59	5–4	Alfond Arena (1,280); Orono, Maine
Dec 18, 2007*		Winthrop	W 64–59	6–4	Knott Arena (702); Emmitsburg, Maryland
Dec 21, 2007*		Lafayette	L 72–76	6–5	Knott Arena (883); Emmitsburg, Maryland
Dec 28, 2007*		at Oregon	L 73–81	6–6	McArthur Court (8,916); Eugene, Oregon
Jan 3, 2008		at St. Francis (NY)	W 68–60	7–6 (3–0)	Pope Physical Education Center (203); Brooklyn, New York
Jan 5, 2008		Fairleigh Dickinson	L 62–65	7–7 (3–1)	Knott Arena (902); Emmitsburg, Maryland
Jan 7, 2008*		at Oklahoma	L 57–81	7–8	Lloyd Noble Center (8,958); Norman, Oklahoma
Jan 10, 2008		at Quinnipiac	L 59–70	7–9 (3–2)	TD Bank Sports Center (968); Hamden, Connecticut
Jan 16, 2008		Saint Francis (PA)	W 56–44	8–9 (4–2)	Knott Arena (1,011); Emmitsburg, Maryland
Jan 19, 2008		Sacred Heart	L 59–67	8–10 (4–3)	Knott Arena (1,202); Emmitsburg, Maryland
Jan 24, 2008		at Wagner	L 70–74	8–11 (4–4)	Spiro Sports Center (1,278); Staten Island, New York
Jan 26, 2008		at Long Island	W 80–66	9–11 (5–4)	Steinberg Wellness Center (698); Brooklyn, New York
Jan 31, 2008		St. Francis (NY)	W 97–60	10–11 (6–4)	Knott Arena (1,002); Emmitsburg, Maryland
Feb 2, 2008		Robert Morris	L 63–75	10–12 (6–5)	Knott Arena (2,516); Emmitsburg, Maryland
Feb 7, 2008		Wagner	L 75–83 ^{OT}	10–13 (6–6)	Knott Arena (774); Emmitsburg, Maryland
Feb 9, 2008		at Monmouth	W 76–66	11–13 (7–6)	Boylan Gymnasium (1,843); West Long Branch, New Jersey
Feb 14, 2008		at Fairleigh Dickinson	W 78–61	12–13 (8–6)	Rothman Center (312); Hackensack, New Jersey
Feb 16, 2008		Quinnipiac	W 77–70	13–13 (9–6)	Knott Arena (1,202); Emmitsburg, Maryland
Feb 21, 2008		at Robert Morris	L 66–69	13–14 (9–7)	Charles L. Sewall Center (1,011); Moon Township, Pennsylvania
Feb 23, 2008		at Saint Francis (PA)	W 72–61	14–14 (10–7)	DeGol Arena (1,676); Loretto, Pennsylvania
Mar 1, 2008		Monmouth	W 81–67	15–14 (11–7)	Knott Arena (1,243); Emmitsburg, Maryland
Northeast Conference tournament
Mar 6, 2008*		Quinnipiac; Quarterfinals	W 80–70	16–14	Knott Arena (1,670); Emmitsburg, Maryland
Mar 9, 2008*		at Robert Morris; Semifinals	W 83–65	17–14	Charles L. Sewall Center (2,061); Moon Township, Pennsylvania
Mar 12, 2008*		at Sacred Heart; Championship Game	W 68–55	18–14	William H. Pitt Center (2,774); Fairfield, Connecticut
NCAA tournament
Mar 18, 2008*		vs. Coppin State; Play-in Game	W 69–60	19–14	University of Dayton Arena (8,464); Dayton, Ohio
Mar 21, 2008*	(16 E)	vs. (1 E) No. 1 North Carolina; First Round	L 74–113	19–15	RBC Center (19,477); Raleigh, North Carolina
*Non-conference game. ^{#}Rankings from AP Poll, (#) during NCAA Tournament is seed within region S=South. (#) Tournament seedings in parentheses. All times are in Eastern Time.
