= 2008 Northeast Conference men's basketball tournament =

- Classification: Division I
- Season: 2007–08
- Teams: 8
- Site: Campus sites
- Finals site: William H. Pitt Center; Fairfield, Connecticut
- Champions: Mount Saint Mary's (3rd title)
- Winning coach: Milan Brown (1st title)
- MVP: Jean Cajou (Mount St. Mary's)

2007–08 Northeast Conference men's basketball standings
| | Conf. | | | | Overall |
| Team | W | | L | PCT | W | | L | PCT |
|---|---|---|---|---|---|---|---|---|
| Robert Morris | 16 | – | 2 | .889 | 26 | – | 8 | .765 |
| Wagner | 15 | – | 3 | .833 | 23 | – | 8 | .742 |
| Sacred Heart | 13 | – | 5 | .722 | 18 | – | 14 | .563 |
| Mount St. Mary's † | 11 | – | 7 | .611 | 19 | – | 15 | .559 |
| Quinnipiac | 11 | – | 7 | .611 | 15 | – | 15 | .500 |
| Central Connecticut | 10 | – | 8 | .556 | 14 | – | 16 | .467 |
| Long Island | 7 | – | 11 | .389 | 15 | – | 15 | .500 |
| Monmouth | 4 | – | 14 | .222 | 7 | – | 24 | .226 |
| Fairleigh Dickinson | 4 | – | 14 | .222 | 8 | – | 20 | .286 |
| St. Francis (NY) | 4 | – | 14 | .222 | 7 | – | 22 | .241 |
| Saint Francis (PA) | 4 | – | 14 | .222 | 6 | – | 23 | .207 |
† 2008 NEC tournament winner

The 2008 Northeast Conference men's basketball tournament took place March 6–12, 2008, at campus sites. Mount Saint Mary's won the tournament to receive an automatic berth to the 2008 NCAA Men's Division I Basketball Tournament.

== Format ==
The top eight eligible men's basketball teams in the Northeast Conference receive a berth in the conference tournament. After the conference season, teams are seeded by conference record. The semifinals matchups will be the highest and lowest remaining seeds in one game and the other two seeds in the other game. All games are held at the home court of the higher-seeded team.

== Bracket ==
Quarterfinals; March 6
1 | Robert Morris | 64
8 | Monmouth | 50
4 | Mount St. Mary's | 80
5 | Quinnipiac | 70
(Pairings are reseeded after the first round)
3 | Sacred Heart | 84
6 | Central Connecticut | 71
2 | Wagner | 71
7 | Long Island | 62

Semifinals; March 9
1 | Robert Morris | 65
4 | Mount St. Mary's | 83
3 | Sacred Heart | 55
2 | Wagner | 49

Finals; March 12
4 | Mount St. Mary's | 68
3 | Sacred Heart | 55

== All-tournament team ==
Tournament MVP in bold.

**2008 NEC All-Tournament Team**

**Jean Cajou**, MSM
Brice Brooks, SHU
Mark Porter, WAGNER
Drew Shubik, SHU
Jeremy Goode, MSM

== Sources ==
- Tournament Bracket
