= Bryant–Wagner brawl =

Brawl that occurred during the 2022 Northeast Conference championship game

2022 Northeast Conference championship game
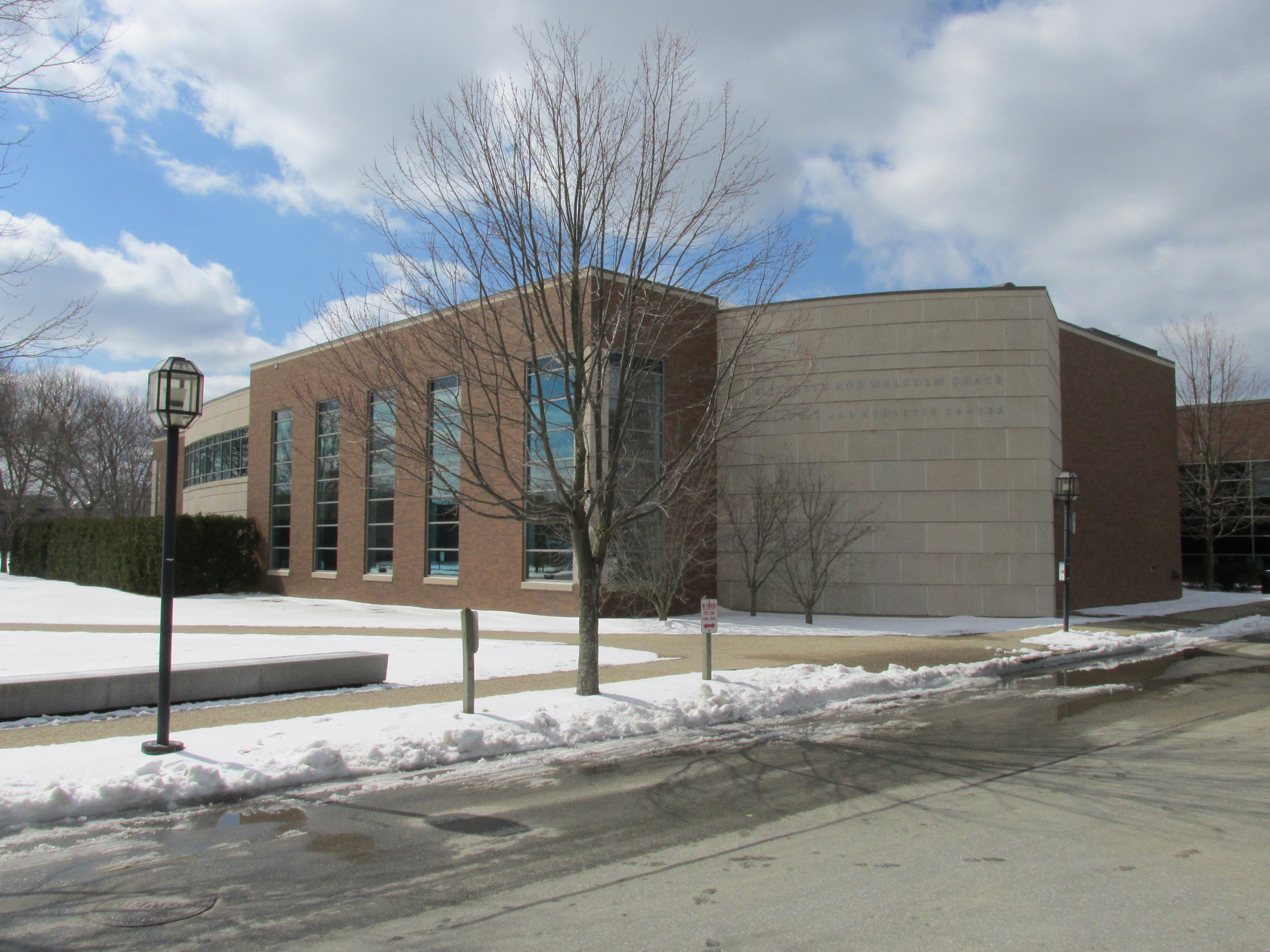
- Chace Athletic Center, the site of the brawl
Wagner Seahawks	Bryant Bulldogs
(21–6)	(22–9)
43	70
Head coach: Bashir Mason	Head coach: Jared Grasso
	1st half	2nd half	Total
Wagner Seahawks	12	31	43
Bryant Bulldogs	38	32	70
- Date: March 8, 2022
- Venue: Chace Athletic Center, Smithfield, RI
- Attendance: 2,650

United States TV coverage
- Network: ESPN2

The Bryant–Wagner brawl was an altercation at an National Collegiate Athletic Association (NCAA) Division I men's college basketball game between the home team Bryant Bulldogs and visiting Wagner Seahawks on March 8, 2022, during the 2022 Northeast Conference championship game. The championship game would determine the team that earned the conference's automatic bid to the 2022 NCAA Division I men's basketball tournament.

With 4:37 remaining to play in the second half and Bryant leading 68–32, a brawl between Bryant students and fans and Wagner students, fans and players' family members occurred during a timeout. The fight broke out in Chace Athletic Center's student section occupied by Bryant University students. During the brawl, several drinks and bottles were thrown onto the court and at opposing fans, punches were exchanged and fans from both schools violently pushed each other. Wagner player Will Martinez tried to enter the stands before being held back by staff members and teammates, and was ejected from the game for leaving the bench area during the altercation.

The brawl suspended gameplay for over 30 minutes, as fans were forced to leave the arena before play could resume. Bryant won the championship game 70–43 to clinch its first bid to the NCAA Tournament in program history. As a result of the fight, a 20-year old Bryant University student was arrested by the Rhode Island State Police, charged with disorderly conduct and obstructing an officer in execution of duty.

== Background ==
The teams representing Bryant University and Wagner College advanced to the championship game of the 2022 Northeast Conference tournament. Bryant, a Division I school since 2008, finished 16–2 in conference play to claim its first-ever NEC regular season title. It did so by defeating Wagner 78–70 in the regular season finale, pushing the Seahawks down to second place in the NEC with a 15–3 conference record. Wagner started conference play 13–0, but lost three of its last five games. Senior guard Elijah Ford, Wagner's top shot-blocker and third-leading scorer, tore his ACL in February, which ended his season and college career, and Wagner struggled in his absence.

In fear of being heckled by Bryant students, Wagner moved its Tuesday practice to nearby Providence College, hours before the game. As Wagner players got off the team bus and entered the Chace Athletic Center right before the game, Bryant students continued to harass Wagner players, with one shouting "Fuck you, Martinez!" at Will Martinez. Bryant's public address announcer Jake Zimmer requested several times that Bryant students tone down the explicit language used to heckle Wagner, but the warnings were not followed.

Bryant jumped out to a dominant 36–6 lead over Wagner in the first half of the championship game, where they cruised to a sizeable lead at halftime.

== Brawl ==
Bryant called a timeout, up 68–32 with 4:37 left in the second half. During the timeout, a fight broke out between Wagner and Bryant fans in Bryant's student section, which was located right behind the Wagner bench and fan section. Close to 200 Wagner fans traveled to Rhode Island for the game. Fans were seen throwing bottles and drinks at each other and onto the court, violently pushing each other, and multiple punches were thrown. Will Martinez, a player on the Wagner team, tried to enter the stands before immediately being held back by his teammates. He was ejected from the game for leaving the bench area.

The brawl stopped play for over 30 minutes. Both teams retreated to their locker rooms. After the skirmish had calmed down, Bryant athletic director Bill Smith ordered the clearing of the student section and the Wagner fan section, including the Wagner band. Law enforcement officials removed multiple Bryant fans from the stands. All Wagner fans were forced out of the building and staff members discussed also clearing out every spectator from the arena, but Grasso said, "We’re not telling these fans to leave." The family members of Wagner players were ultimately allowed back into the facility, with police officers acting as a natural barrier between the Wagner family members and the Bryant fans.

Smith ordered that the remaining fans in attendance were not allowed to storm the court until all Wagner players had left the premises. Upon the restarting of the game, Bryant mostly dribbled out the shot clock on its possessions. With 2.6 seconds left in the game, Wagner players left the floor, allowing for Bryant fans to storm the court in celebration of the school's first NCAA Tournament bid.

Peter Kiss ended with a game-high 34 points. Morales, who won NEC Player of the Year over Kiss, finished with 3 points on 0-for-16 shooting from the floor, his first performance with zero field goals in 72 career games with Wagner.

== Aftermath ==
The Rhode Island State Police arrested 20-year-old Bryant student Connor Gleim, from Raynham, Massachusetts, in connection with the brawl. Gleim was charged with disorderly conduct and obstructing an officer in execution of duty.

=== Reactions ===
==== Bryant ====
Bryant head coach Jared Grasso said after the game, "It was an unfortunate incident. Again, I have no idea what took place. I don't know how it started, why it started, what took place. Thankfully, our guys were not a part of it."

In a statement released the day after the brawl, Bryant University president Ross Gittell said, "The team presented Bryant spirit and character that was unfortunately not demonstrated by all of our students in the stands last night. At Bryant we know we are better than what some of our students demonstrated last night. Treating others with respect and care is who we are, and we did not do that as a community as well as we should have last night. We must and will do better going forward." Gittell said that he had reached out to Wagner's interim president.

Bryant University said that the brawl is under investigation and that students involved will face consequences.

==== Wagner ====
Wagner College interim president Angelo Araimo released a statement confirming that all Wagner players, staff and students who travelled to the game had returned to Staten Island safe. "After the game was stopped in the second half due to an altercation in the stands, we made the decision to remove our band, spirit teams and fans from the arena. No Wagner student was directly involved in the incident, but we decided to remove ourselves from the increasingly hostile and unmanageable environment," Araimo said.

==== Northeast Conference ====
NEC commissioner Noreen Morris said she was "disgusted" by the events and that the conference would launch an investigation into the brawl. Morris vowed to review the conference's game management policy to prevent future skirmishes. Morris and two NEC head coaches refused to comment for a New York Post article profiling Kiss before the NCAA Tournament.

Shortly thereafter, Bryant left the NEC and joined the America East Conference.
