= 2005–06 Monmouth Hawks men's basketball team =

American college basketball season

2005–06 Monmouth Hawks men's basketball

Northeast Conference tournament champions

NCAA tournament
- Conference: Northeast Conference
- Record: 19–15 (12–6 NEC)
- Head coach: Dave Calloway (9th season)
- Home arena: William T. Boylan Gymnasium

2005–06 Northeast Conference men's basketball standings
	Conf.				Overall
Team	W		L	PCT	W		L	PCT
Fairleigh Dickinson	14	–	4	.778	20	–	12	.625
Central Connecticut	13	–	5	.722	18	–	11	.621
Monmouth †	12	–	6	.667	19	–	15	.559
Mount St. Mary's	11	–	7	.611	13	–	17	.433
Robert Morris	10	–	8	.556	15	–	14	.517
Long Island	9	–	9	.500	12	–	16	.429
Sacred Heart	8	–	10	.444	11	–	17	.393
Quinnipiac	7	–	11	.389	12	–	16	.429
St. Francis (NY)	7	–	11	.389	10	–	17	.370
Wagner	6	–	12	.333	13	–	14	.481
Saint Francis (PA)	2	–	16	.111	4	–	24	.143
† 2006 NEC tournament winner

The 2005–06 Monmouth Hawks men's basketball team represented Monmouth University during the 2005–06 NCAA Division I men's basketball season. The Hawks, led by 9th-year head coach Dave Calloway, played their home games at the William T. Boylan Gymnasium and were members of the Northeast Conference. They finished the season 19–15, 12–6 in NEC play to finish in third place. They won the Northeast Conference Basketball tournament to earn the conference's automatic bid to the NCAA tournament. Playing as one of two No. 16 seeds in the Midwest region, the Hawks defeated fellow No. 16 seed Hampton in the Play-in game before losing to No. 1 seed Villanova in the opening round.

== Roster ==
2005–06 Monmouth Hawks men's basketball team
Players
Coaches

Pos.	#	Name	Height	Weight	Year	Previous school	Hometown
F	1	Dejan Delic	6 ft 6 in (1.98 m)	215 lb (98 kg)	Sr	Bridgton Academy	Belgrade, Serbia-Montenegro
G	2	Alex Nunner	6 ft 3 in (1.91 m)	185 lb (84 kg)	So	Bhak Bruck Mur	Leibnitz, Austria
G	3	Tyler Azzarelli	6 ft 1 in (1.85 m)	175 lb (79 kg)	Sr	Henry B. Plant HS	Tampa, Florida
G	3	Mike Shipman	6 ft 1 in (1.85 m)	175 lb (79 kg)	Fr	Bronx, New York
G	5	Whitney Coleman	6 ft 3 in (1.91 m)	190 lb (86 kg)	So	East Lyme HS; St. Thomas More Prep	Salem, Connecticut
F	11	Jon Ager	5 ft 11 in (1.8 m)	165 lb (75 kg)	So	St. Mary's HS	Queens Village, New York
F	13	Corey Hallett	6 ft 10 in (2.08 m)	230 lb (104 kg)	Sr	Shelburne	Shelburne, Nova Scotia, Canada
F	21	Tyson Johnson	6 ft 5 in (1.96 m)	245 lb (111 kg)	Fr	Manhasset, New York
F	23	Marques Alston	6 ft 4 in (1.93 m)	230 lb (104 kg)	Sr	Neptune HS	Neptune, New Jersey
G	33	Steve Bazaz	6 ft 2 in (1.88 m)	175 lb (79 kg)	Sr	Shore Regional HS	West Long Branch, New Jersey
F	34	Brent Wilson	6 ft 8 in (2.03 m)	215 lb (98 kg)	Sr	Chanute HS; Dodge City CC	Chanute, Kansas
G	35	Chris Kenny	6 ft 3 in (1.91 m)	180 lb (82 kg)	Sr	Spring Lake, New Jersey
C	45	Shawn Barlow	6 ft 11 in (2.11 m)	250 lb (113 kg)	RS Fr	St. Augustine Prep	Marlton, New Jersey
C	52	John Bunch	7 ft 2 in (2.18 m)	320 lb (145 kg)	Sr	Randallstown HS	Randallstown, Maryland

Head coach

- Dave Calloway

Assistant coach(es)

- Geoff Billet

Legend

- (C) Team captain
- (S) Suspended
- (I) Ineligible
- (W) Walk-on
- Injured
- Current redshirt

Roster

== Schedule and results ==
Date time, TV	Rank^{#}	Opponent^{#}	Result	Record	Site (attendance) city, state
Regular season
Nov 21, 2005*; 10:00 p.m.		at San Francisco	L 66–70	0–1	War Memorial Gymnasium (2,119); San Francisco, California
Nov 24, 2005*; 12:00 p.m.		vs. Southern Illinois; Great Alaska Shootout	W 80–68	1–1	Sullivan Arena (6,882); Anchorage, Alaska
Nov 25, 2005*; 11:50 p.m.		vs. South Carolina; Great Alaska Shootout	L 56–62	1–2	Sullivan Arena (7,259); Anchorage, Alaska
Nov 26, 2005*; 7:30 p.m.		vs. Oral Roberts; Great Alaska Shootout	L 54–62	1–3	Sullivan Arena (7,321); Anchorage, Alaska
Dec 3, 2005*; 7:00 p.m.		Rider	L 67–75	1–4	Boylan Gymnasium (2,011); West Long Branch, New Jersey
Dec 6, 2005*; 7:00 p.m.		at Saint Peter's	L 60–73	1–5	Yanitelli Center (2,236); Jersey City, New Jersey
Dec 8, 2005*; 7:30 p.m.		at Seton Hall	L 45–61	1–6	Continental Airlines Arena (5,034); East Rutherford, New Jersey
Dec 12, 2005*; 7:00 p.m.		at Lehigh	L 57–71	1–7	Stabler Arena (439); Bethlehem, Pennsylvania
Dec 14, 2005*; 7:30 p.m.		at Princeton	W 41–21	2–7	Jadwin Gymnasium (2,535); Princeton, New Jersey
Dec 18, 2005; 4:00 p.m.		Sacred Heart	W 73–64	3–7 (1–0)	Boylan Gymnasium (1,346); West Long Branch, New Jersey
Dec 28, 2005*; 7:00 p.m.		at Hartford	W 56–54	4–7	Chase Arena at Reich Family Pavilion (1,388); West Hartford, Connecticut
Dec 31, 2005*; 4:00 p.m.		Drexel	L 49–53	4–8	Boylan Gymnasium (1,421); West Long Branch, New Jersey
Jan 3, 2006; 7:00 p.m.		at St. Francis (NY)	W 66–59	5–8 (2–0)	Generoso Pope Athletic Complex (211); Brooklyn, New York
Jan 5, 2006; 7:00 p.m.		Robert Morris	L 75–87	5–9 (2–1)	Boylan Gymnasium (1,014); West Long Branch, New Jersey
Jan 7, 2006; 7:00 p.m.		Saint Francis (PA)	W 55–53	6–9 (3–1)	Boylan Gymnasium (2,004); West Long Branch, New Jersey
Jan 12, 2006; 7:00 p.m.		at Central Connecticut State	W 61–57	7–9 (4–1)	Detrick Gymnasium (1,855); New Britain, Connecticut
Jan 14, 2006; 4:00 p.m.		at Quinnipiac	W 85–82 ^{OT}	8–9 (5–1)	Burt Kahn Court (890); Hamden, Connecticut
Jan 19, 2006; 7:00 p.m.		Mount St. Mary's	L 54–64	8–10 (5–2)	Boylan Gymnasium (1,834); West Long Branch, New Jersey
Jan 21, 2006; 7:00 p.m.		Quinnipiac	W 80–74 ^{2OT}	9–10 (6–2)	Boylan Gymnasium (1,944); West Long Branch, New Jersey
Jan 26, 2006; 7:30 p.m.		at Robert Morris	L 65–73	9–11 (6–3)	Charles L. Sewall Center (1,073); Moon Township, Pennsylvania
Jan 28, 2006; 7:00 p.m.		at Saint Francis (PA)	W 74–56	10–11 (7–3)	DeGol Arena (2,423); Loretto, Pennsylvania
Feb 4, 2006; 7:00 p.m.		Central Connecticut State	W 63–48	11–11 (8–3)	Boylan Gymnasium (2,096); West Long Branch, New Jersey
Feb 6, 2006; 7:00 p.m.		at Wagner	W 74–58	12–11 (9–3)	Spiro Sports Center (1,682); Staten Island, New York
Feb 11, 2006; 7:00 p.m.		at Long Island	L 72–78	12–12 (9–4)	Steinberg Wellness Center (559); Brooklyn, New York
Feb 13, 2006; 7:00 p.m.		Wagner	W 61–55	13–12 (10–4)	Boylan Gymnasium (1,622); West Long Branch, New Jersey
Feb 18, 2006; 1:00 p.m.		at Mount St. Mary's	L 69–75	13–13 (10–5)	Knott Arena (1,503); Emmitsburg, Maryland
Feb 20, 2006; 7:00 p.m.		Fairleigh Dickinson	W 96–89 ^{2OT}	14–13 (11–5)	Boylan Gymnasium (2,329); West Long Branch, New Jersey
Feb 25, 2006; 7:00 p.m.		St. Francis (NY)	W 74–68	15–13 (12–5)	Boylan Gymnasium (2,247); West Long Branch, New Jersey
Feb 27, 2006; 7:00 p.m.		at Fairleigh Dickinson	L 62–79	15–14 (12–6)	Rothman Center (3,024); Hackensack, New Jersey
NEC tournament
Mar 2, 2006*	(3)	(6) Long Island; Quarterfinals	W 74–63	16–14	Boylan Gymnasium (1,131); West Long Branch, New Jersey
Mar 5, 2006*	(3)	at (2) Central Connecticut State; Semifinals	W 62–48	17–14	Detrick Gymnasium (2,614); New Britain, Connecticut
Mar 8, 2006*	(3)	at (1) Fairleigh Dickinson; Championship game	W 49–48	18–14	Rothman Center (1,846); Hackensack, New Jersey
NCAA tournament
Mar 14, 2006*	(16 M)	vs. (16 M) Hampton; Play-in game	W 71–49	19–14	UD Arena (7,764); Dayton, Ohio
Mar 17, 2006*	(16 M)	vs. (1 M) No. 3 Villanova; First round	L 45–58	19–15	Wachovia Center (19,990); Philadelphia, Pennsylvania
*Non-conference game. ^{#}Rankings from AP Poll. (#) Tournament seedings in parentheses. M=Minneapolis. All times are in Eastern Time.
