= 1991–92 Robert Morris Colonials men's basketball team =

American college basketball season

1991–92 Robert Morris Colonials men's basketball

NEC Regular Season Champions NEC tournament champions

NCAA tournament
- Conference: Northeast Conference
- Record: 19–12 (12–4 NEC)
- Head coach: Jarrett Durham
- Home arena: Charles L. Sewall Center

1991–92 Northeast Conference men's basketball standings
	Conf.				Overall
Team	W		L	PCT	W		L	PCT
Robert Morris†	12	–	4	.750	19	–	12	.613
Monmouth	11	–	5	.688	20	–	9	.690
Fairleigh Dickinson	11	–	5	.688	14	–	14	.500
Wagner	9	–	7	.563	16	–	12	.571
St. Francis (NY)	8	–	8	.500	15	–	14	.517
Long Island	7	–	9	.438	11	–	18	.379
Marist	6	–	10	.375	10	–	20	.333
Saint Francis (PA)	5	–	11	.313	13	–	16	.448
Mount St. Mary's	3	–	13	.188	6	–	22	.214
† 1992 NEC tournament winner

The 1991–92 Robert Morris Colonials men's basketball team represented Robert Morris University in the 1991–92 NCAA Division I basketball season. Robert Morris was coached by Jarrett Durham and played their home games at the Charles L. Sewall Center in Moon Township, Pennsylvania. The Colonials were members of the Northeast Conference. They finished the season 19–12, 12–4 in NEC play. They won the 1992 Northeast Conference men's basketball tournament to earn the conference's automatic bid to the 1992 NCAA Division I men's basketball tournament. They earned a 16 seed in the West Region and played No. 1 seed UCLA in the first round. The Colonials were beaten 73–53 to end their season.

== Roster ==
1991–92 Robert Morris Colonials men's basketball team
Players
Coaches

Pos.	#	Name	Height	Weight	Year	Hometown
C		Ricky Cannon	6 ft 8 in (2.03 m)	—	Sr
G		Bubba Donnelly	5 ft 10 in (1.78 m)	—	Fr
F		Joe Falletta	6 ft 7 in (2.01 m)	—	Sr
G		Wade Timmerson	5 ft 9 in (1.75 m)	—	Sr
G		Myron Walker	6 ft 4 in (1.93 m)	—	So

Head coach

- Jarrett Durham

Assistant coach(es)

Legend

- (C) Team captain
- (S) Suspended
- (I) Ineligible
- (W) Walk-on
- Injured
- Current redshirt

== Schedule and results ==
Date time, TV	Rank^{#}	Opponent^{#}	Result	Record	Site (attendance) city, state
Regular season
Dec 2, 1991*		Marshall	W 85–61	1–0	Charles L. Sewall Center (1,033); Moon Township, Pennsylvania
Dec 5, 1991*		at West Virginia	L 69–79	1–1	WVU Coliseum (6,132); Morgantown, West Virginia
Dec 7, 1991*		Youngstown State	W 75–64	2–1	Charles L. Sewall Center (1,007); Moon Township, Pennsylvania
Dec 10, 1991*		Duquesne	L 82–93	2–2	Charles L. Sewall Center (2,452); Moon Township, Pennsylvania
Dec 12, 1991*		at Ohio	L 67–78	2–3	Convocation Center (1,471); Athens, Ohio
Dec 23, 1991*		at Florida State	L 60–76	2–4	Tallahassee-Leon County Civic Center (5,091); Tallahassee, Florida
Dec 28, 1991*		at USC	L 77–92	2–5	L.A. Sports Arena (2,314); Los Angeles, California
Dec 30, 1991*		at Long Beach State	L 81–84	2–6	The Gold Mine (903); Long Beach, California
Jan 4, 1992*		at Central Connecticut State	W 81–63	3–6	Detrick Gymnasium (425); New Britain, Connecticut
Jan 7, 1992		at Fairleigh Dickinson	W 61–57	4–6 (1–0)	Rothman Center (850); Hackensack, New Jersey
Jan 9, 1992		at Marist	W 70–63	5–6 (2–0)	McCann Recreation Center (2,096); Poughkeepsie, New York
Jan 11, 1992		Wagner	W 79–61	6–6 (3–0)	Charles L. Sewall Center (1,128); Moon Township, Pennsylvania
Jan 13, 1992		Monmouth	L 68–72	6–7 (3–1)	Charles L. Sewall Center (1,221); Moon Township, Pennsylvania
Jan 15, 1992*		at Dayton	L 65–82	6–8	University of Dayton Arena (11,573); Dayton, Ohio
Jan 18, 1992		at Saint Francis (PA)	W 70–45	7–8 (4–1)	DeGol Arena (2,759); Loretto, Pennsylvania
Jan 23, 1992		at Mount St. Mary's	L 63–72	7–9 (4–2)	Knott Arena (1,792); Emmitsburg, Maryland
Jan 25, 1992		LIU Brooklyn	W 81–68	8–9 (5–2)	Charles L. Sewall Center (767); Moon Township, Pennsylvania
Jan 27, 1992		St. Francis Brooklyn	W 64–46	9–9 (6–2)	Charles L. Sewall Center (861); Moon Township, Pennsylvania
Feb 1, 1992		at Monmouth	L 46–55	9–10 (6–3)	Boylan Gymnasium (2,756); West Long Branch, New Jersey
Feb 3, 1992		at Wagner	W 74–70	10–10 (7–3)	Sutter Gymnasium (1,148); Staten Island, New York
Feb 6, 1992		Fairleigh Dickinson	W 68–56	11–10 (8–3)	Charles L. Sewall Center (1,464); Moon Township, Pennsylvania
Feb 8, 1992		Marist	W 73–69	12–10 (9–3)	Charles L. Sewall Center (1,538); Moon Township, Pennsylvania
Feb 11, 1992*		Canisius	W 91–76	13–10	Charles L. Sewall Center (936); Moon Township, Pennsylvania
Feb 15, 1992*		Saint Francis (PA)	W 93–61	14–10 (10–3)	Charles L. Sewall Center (1,639); Moon Township, Pennsylvania
Feb 20, 1992		Mount St. Mary's	W 98–91	15–10 (11–3)	Charles L. Sewall Center (1,159); Moon Township, Pennsylvania
Feb 27, 1992		at St. Francis Brooklyn	L 68–84	15–11 (11–4)	Pope Physical Education Center (350); Brooklyn, New York
Feb 29, 1992		at Long Island University	W 103–94	16–11 (12–4)	Schwartz Athletic Center (350); Brooklyn, New York
NEC tournament
Mar 3, 1992*		Saint Francis (PA); Quarterfinals	W 83–66	17–11	Charles L. Sewall Center (1,041); Moon Township, Pennsylvania
Mar 4, 1992*		St. Francis Brooklyn; Semifinals	W 70–68	18–11	Charles L. Sewall Center (828); Moon Township, Pennsylvania
Mar 5, 1992*		Marist; Championship Game	W 85–81	19–11	Charles L. Sewall Center (1,788); Moon Township, Pennsylvania
NCAA tournament
Mar 20, 1992*	(16 W)	vs. (1 W) No. 4 UCLA; First Round	L 53–73	19–12	ASU Activity Center (7,639); Tempe, Arizona
*Non-conference game. ^{#}Rankings from AP Poll. (#) Tournament seedings in parentheses.

== Awards and honors ==
- Myron Walker – NEC Player of the Year
