= 2006 Northeast Conference men's basketball tournament =

- Classification: Division I
- Season: 2005–06
- Teams: 8
- Site: Campus sites
- Finals site: Rothman Center; Hackensack, NJ
- Champions: Monmouth (4th title)
- Winning coach: Dave Calloway (3rd title)
- MVP: Marques Alston (Monmouth)

2005–06 Northeast Conference men's basketball standings
	Conf.				Overall
Team	W		L	PCT	W		L	PCT
Fairleigh Dickinson	14	–	4	.778	20	–	12	.625
Central Connecticut	13	–	5	.722	18	–	11	.621
Monmouth †	12	–	6	.667	19	–	15	.559
Mount St. Mary's	11	–	7	.611	13	–	17	.433
Robert Morris	10	–	8	.556	15	–	14	.517
Long Island	9	–	9	.500	12	–	16	.429
Sacred Heart	8	–	10	.444	11	–	17	.393
Quinnipiac	7	–	11	.389	12	–	16	.429
St. Francis (NY)	7	–	11	.389	10	–	17	.370
Wagner	6	–	12	.333	13	–	14	.481
Saint Francis (PA)	2	–	16	.111	4	–	24	.143
† 2006 NEC tournament winner

The 2006 Northeast Conference men's basketball tournament was held in March. The tournament featured the league's top eight seeds. Monmouth won the championship, its first, and received the conferences automatic bid to the 2006 NCAA Tournament.

== Format ==
For the second straight year, the NEC Men’s Basketball Tournament will consist of an eight-team playoff format with all games played at the home of the higher seed. After the quarterfinals, the teams will be reseeded so the highest remaining seed plays the lowest remaining seed in the semifinals.

== Bracket ==
Quarterfinals
1	Fairleigh Dickinson	66
8	Quinnipiac	65
2	Central Connecticut	86
7	Sacred Heart	68
(Pairings are reseeded after the first round)
3	Monmouth	74
6	Long Island	63
4	Mount St. Mary's	66
5	Robert Morris	67

Semifinals
1	Fairleigh Dickinson	71
5	Robert Morris	55
2	Central Connecticut	48
3	Monmouth	62

Championship Game
1	Fairleigh Dickinson	48
3	Monmouth	49

== All-tournament team ==
Tournament MVP in bold.

**2006 NEC All-Tournament Team**

**Marques Alston**, MU
Chris Kenny, MU
Andrea Crosariol, FDU
Chad Timberlake, FDU
Jeremy Chappell, RMU
