= Dave Calloway =

Biographical details
- Born: October 7, 1968 (age 58); Williamstown, New Jersey, U.S.

Playing career
- 1987–1991: Monmouth

Coaching career (HC unless noted)
- 1991–1998: Monmouth (assistant)
- 1998–2011: Monmouth

Head coaching record
- Overall: 178–227

Accomplishments and honors

Championships
- 3× NEC tournament (2001, 2004, 2006); 2× NEC regular season (2004, 2005)

Awards
- NEC Coach of the Year (2001)

David Vincent Calloway (born October 7, 1968) is an American college basketball coach and the former head men's basketball coach at Monmouth University.

Raised in the Williamstown of Monroe Township, Gloucester County, New Jersey, Calloway starred at St. Joseph High School. While coaching at Monmouth, Calloway was a resident of Belmar, New Jersey.

== Head coaching record ==
Record table
Season	Team	Overall	Conference	Standing	Postseason
Monmouth Hawks (Northeast Conference) (1998–2011)
1997–98	Monmouth	3–10	3–9	9th	
1998–99	Monmouth	5–21	5–13	11th	
1999–00	Monmouth	12–16	9–9	6th	
2000–01	Monmouth	21–10	15–5	2nd	NCAA Division I First Round
2001–02	Monmouth	18–12	14–6	4th	
2002–03	Monmouth	15–13	13–5	2nd	
2003–04	Monmouth	21–12	12–6	1st	NCAA Division I First Round
2004–05	Monmouth	16–13	14–4	1st	
2005–06	Monmouth	19–15	12–6	3rd	NCAA Division I First Round
2006–07	Monmouth	12–18	7–11	T–8th	
2007–08	Monmouth	7–24	4–14	T–8th	
2008–09	Monmouth	8–23	6–12	T–9th	
2009–10	Monmouth	12–19	8–10	T–8th	
2010–11	Monmouth	9–21	5–13	11th	
Monmouth:		178–227	127–123		
Total:		178–227			
National champion Postseason invitational champion Conference regular season champion Conference regular season and conference tournament champion Division regular season champion Division regular season and conference tournament champion Conference tournament champion
