= 2000–01 St. Francis Terriers men's basketball team =

American college basketball season

2000–01 St. Francis Terriers men's basketball

NEC Regular Season Champions
- Conference: Northeast Conference
- Record: 18–11 (16–4 NEC)
- Head coach: Ron Ganulin (10th season)
- Assistant coaches: Glenn Braica (12th season); Ed Custodio (3rd season)
- Home arena: Generoso Pope Athletic Complex

2000–01 Northeast Conference men's basketball standings
	Conf.				Overall
Team	W		L	PCT	W		L	PCT
St. Francis (NY)	16	–	4	.800	18	–	11	.621
Monmouth †	15	–	5	.750	21	–	10	.677
UMBC	13	–	7	.650	18	–	11	.621
Long Island	12	–	8	.600	12	–	16	.429
Wagner	11	–	9	.550	16	–	13	.552
Central Connecticut	11	–	9	.550	14	–	14	.500
Fairleigh Dickinson	10	–	10	.500	13	–	15	.464
Saint Francis (PA)	9	–	11	.450	9	–	18	.333
Mount St. Mary's	7	–	13	.350	7	–	21	.250
Robert Morris	7	–	13	.350	7	–	22	.241
Sacred Heart	6	–	14	.300	7	–	21	.250
Quinnipiac	3	–	17	.150	6	–	21	.222
† 2001 NEC tournament winner

The 2000–01 St. Francis Terriers men's basketball team represented St. Francis College during the 2000–01 NCAA Division I men's basketball season. The team was coached by Ron Ganulin, who was in his tenth year at the helm of the St. Francis Terriers. The Terriers' home games were played at the Generoso Pope Athletic Complex. The team has been a member of the Northeast Conference since 1981.

The Terriers finished the season at 18–11 overall and 16–4 in conference play, to win their first Conference Regular Season Championship since being members of the NEC. The Terriers received a bye in the first round of the 2001 NEC Tournament and proceeded to defeat Wagner in the semifinals. The Terriers were just one game away from playing in their first NCAA Tournament before losing to Monmouth in the NEC Championship game 64–67, a game in which they led by 20 points with less than 14 minutes to play.

== Roster ==
2000–01 St. Francis Brooklyn Terriers men's basketball team
Players
Coaches

Pos.	#	Name	Height	Weight	Year	Hometown
G	32	Steven Howard	6 ft 4 in (1.93 m)	205 lb (93 kg)	Sr	Watertown, New York
G/F	33	Richy Dominguez	6 ft 5 in (1.96 m)	195 lb (88 kg)	Sr	Chocó, Colombia
C	15	Heberth Reyes	6 ft 11 in (2.11 m)	245 lb (111 kg)	Sr	San Antonio, Venezuela
G	5	Greg Nunn	5 ft 10 in (1.78 m)	180 lb (82 kg)	Sr	Inwood, New York
G	11	Jamel Smiley	5 ft 11 in (1.8 m)	185 lb (84 kg)	Sr	West Hempstead, New York
G	40	Jim Jean-Pierre	6 ft 4 in (1.93 m)	215 lb (98 kg)	Sr	Brooklyn, New York
G	12	Karl Sanders	5 ft 9 in (1.75 m)	180 lb (82 kg)	Jr	Brooklyn, New York
G	3	Jason Morgan	6 ft 4 in (1.93 m)	190 lb (86 kg)	Jr	Willingboro, New Jersey
F	23	Clifford Strong	6 ft 8 in (2.03 m)	220 lb (100 kg)	So	Brooklyn, New York
F/C	13	Paul Kowalczuk	6 ft 10 in (2.08 m)	225 lb (102 kg)	So	Koszalin, Poland
F	42	Eric Thompson	6 ft 8 in (2.03 m)	215 lb (98 kg)	Fr	Brooklyn, New York
F	34	Patrice Thevenot	6 ft 6 in (1.98 m)	235 lb (107 kg)	Fr	Brooklyn, New York

Head coach

- Ron Ganulin (LIU Brooklyn '67)

Assistant coach(es)

- Glenn Braica (Queens College '89)
- Ed Custodio (St. Francis College '98)

Legend

- (C) Team captain
- (S) Suspended
- (I) Ineligible
- (W) Walk-on
- Injured
- Current redshirt

== Schedule and results ==
Date time, TV	Opponent	Result	Record	Site (attendance) city, state
Regular season
November 19, 2000*; 1:00PM	at Syracuse	L 53–73	0–1	Carrier Dome (17,730); Syracuse, NY
November 28, 2000*; 7:30 pm	at Iona	L 94–102	0–2	Hynes Athletic Center (1,540); New Rochelle, NY
November 30, 2000; 7:00 pm	Quinnipiac	W 86–80	1–2 (1–0)	Generoso Pope Athletic Complex (522); Brooklyn, NY
December 7, 2000; 7:00 pm	at Fairleigh Dickinson	W 79–75	2–2 (2–0)	Rothman Center (1,250); Teaneck, NJ
December 9, 2000*; 7:30 pm	at Pittsburgh	L 68–79	2–3	Fitzgerald Field House (3,233); Pittsburgh, PA
December 12, 2000*; 7:00 pm	Fairfield	L 83–91	2–4	Generoso Pope Athletic Complex (364); Brooklyn, NY
December 23, 2000*; 3:00 pm	at Saint Peter's	L 82–85	2–5	Yanitelli Center (225); Jersey City, NJ
December 29, 2000*; 10:00 pm	at Montana State	L 68–86	2–6	Brick Breeden Fieldhouse (4,044); Bozeman, MT
December 30, 2000*; 8:00 pm	vs. Portland	W 85–77	3–6	Brick Breeden Fieldhouse (4,011); Bozeman, MT
January 3, 2001; 7:00 pm	Central Connecticut State	L 73–77	3–7 (2–1)	Generoso Pope Athletic Complex (364); Brooklyn, NY
January 6, 2001; 7:00 pm	at UMBC	W 95–91 ^{OT}	4–7 (3–1)	Retriever Activities Center (892); Baltimore, MD
January 8, 2001; 7:30 pm	at Mount St. Mary's	W 59–56	5–7 (4–1)	Knott Arena (982); Emmitsburg, MD
January 13, 2001; 4:00 pm	Long Island; Battle of Brooklyn	W 81–63	6–7 (5–1)	Generoso Pope Athletic Complex (674); Brooklyn, NY
January 15, 2001; 7:00 pm	at Saint Francis (PA)	W 71–61	7–7 (6–1)	DeGol Arena (1,043); Loretto, PA
January 20, 2001; 4:00 pm	Robert Morris	W 82–76 ^{OT}	8–7 (7–1)	Generoso Pope Athletic Complex (361); Brooklyn, NY
January 22, 2001; 7:00 pm	Saint Francis (PA)	W 98–75	9–7 (8–1)	Generoso Pope Athletic Complex (224); Brooklyn, NY
January 25, 2001; 7:00 pm	Monmouth	W 86–80	10–7 (9–1)	Generoso Pope Athletic Complex (319); Brooklyn, NY
January 27, 2001; 2:00 pm	at Quinnipiac	W 83–75	11–7 (10–1)	Burt Kahn Court (1,144); Hamden, CT
January 29, 2001; 7:30 pm	at Central Connecticut State	W 80–68	12–7 (11–1)	Burt Kahn Court (1,433); Hamden, CT
February 1, 2001; 7:00 pm	Fairleigh Dickinson	W 79–53	13–7 (12–1)	Generoso Pope Athletic Complex (369); Brooklyn, NY
February 4, 2001; 6:30 pm	at Monmouth	L 77–86	13–8 (12–2)	William T. Boylan Gymnasium (2,500); West Long Branch, NJ
February 8, 2001; 7:00 pm	Mount St. Mary's	W 98–93 ^{OT}	14–8 (13–2)	Generoso Pope Athletic Complex (479); Brooklyn, NY
February 10, 2001; 4:00 pm	UMBC	W 74–64	15–8 (14–2)	Generoso Pope Athletic Complex (511); Brooklyn, NY
February 13, 2001; 7:00 pm	at Long Island	L 83–88	15–9 (14–3)	Schwartz Athletic Center (895); Brooklyn, NY
February 15, 2001; 7:00 pm	Wagner	W 91–75	16–9 (15–3)	Generoso Pope Athletic Complex (605); Brooklyn, NY
February 21, 2001; 7:30 pm	at Sacred Heart	L 66–70	16–10 (15–4)	William H. Pitt Center (401); Fairfield, CT
February 25, 2001; 6:00 pm	at Wagner	W 87–83	17–10 (16–4)	Spiro Sports Center (2,187); Staten Island, NY
2001 NEC tournament
March 4, 2001; 12:00 pm	vs. Wagner; Semifinals	W 72–65	18–10	Sovereign Bank Arena (N/A); Trenton, NJ
March 5, 2001; 9:30 pm	vs. Monmouth; Finals	L 64–67	18–11	Sovereign Bank Arena (817); Trenton, NJ
*Non-conference game. ^{#}Rankings from AP Poll. (#) Tournament seedings in parentheses.
