= Rahsaan Johnson =

American basketball player

Personal information
- Born: April 1, 1978 (age 48) Washington, D.C., U.S.
- Listed height: 6 ft 0 in (1.83 m)
- Listed weight: 175 lb (79 kg)

Career information
- High school: Gonzaga (Washington, D.C.)
- College: Allegany (1997–1998); Monmouth (1999–2002)
- NBA draft: 2002: undrafted
- Position: Guard

Career history
- 2005: Kotwica Kołobrzeg

Career highlights
- NEC Player of the Year (2001); 2× First-team All-NEC (2001, 2002); Second-team All-NEC (2000)

Rahsaan Paul Johnson (born April 1, 1978) is an American former professional basketball player. He played college basketball for the Monmouth Hawks and was selected as the Northeast Conference Player of the Year in 2001.

== High school career ==
Johnson attended Gonzaga College High School in Washington, D.C., and played on the basketball team. He was a role player when the team won the Washington Catholic Athletic Conference during his senior season in 1997.

== College career ==
Johnson started his collegiate career at Allegany College of Maryland where he was a teammate of Steve Francis. Johnson was a key reserve on the team that accumulated a 34–1 record during the 1997–98 season. He arrived back on campus in August 1998 only to be told by an assistant that head coach, Bob Kirk, had decided to revamp his roster and Johnson was no longer wanted.

Johnson returned to Washington, D.C., and participated in pick-up basketball games at a court near his grandmother's home. He played against Kevin Nickelberry who was an assistant coach for the Monmouth Hawks. Nickelberry, who had previously recruited Johnson as an assistant for the Howard Bison, was so impressed by Johnson that he urged Hawks head coach Dave Calloway to give him a scholarship to join the team. A position on the Hawks became available when two players were cut from the team for disciplinary reasons and Johnson was slated to join the team in 1999. Johnson attended Montgomery College during the 1998–99 season to maintain his grade and earn credits without losing his eligibility. He frequently attended Maryland Terrapins games to watch his former Allegany teammate Francis.

Johnson made his debut for the Hawks during the 1999–00 season. He averaged 17.7 points per game and was nominated to the All-Northeast Conference (NEC) second-team. Johnson averaged 19.4 points per game during the 2000–01 regular season and was named as the NEC Player of the Year. He scored the game-winning points in the 2001 NEC tournament final to qualify the Hawks for the 2001 NCAA Division I men's basketball tournament. Johnson averaged 19.2 points, 4.6 rebounds and a league-best 5.4 assists during the 2001–02 season and was selected to the All-NEC first-team.

== Professional career ==
Johnson played one game for Kotwica Kołobrzeg of the Polish Basketball League during the 2005–06 season.
