= Monmouth Hawks men's basketball =

NCAA Division I team

2026–27 Monmouth Hawks men's basketball team
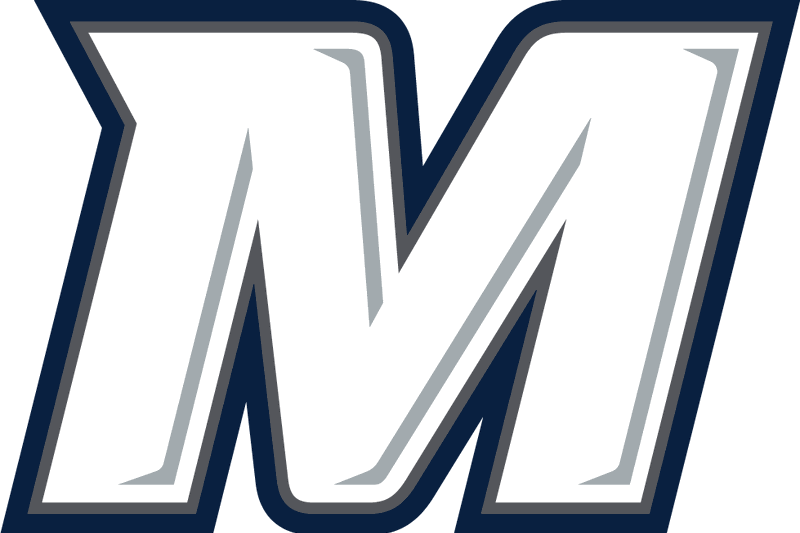
- University: Monmouth University
- Head coach: King Rice (16th season)
- Location: West Long Branch, New Jersey
- Arena: OceanFirst Bank Center (capacity: 4,100)
- Conference: Coastal Athletic Association
- Nickname: Hawks
- Colors: Midnight blue and white

NCAA Division I tournament round of 32
- 1981*, 1982*

NCAA Division I tournament appearances
- 1976^, 1981*, 1982* 1996, 2001, 2004, 2006

Conference tournament champions
- NEC: 1996, 2001, 2004, 2006

Conference regular-season champions
- 2004, 2005, 2016, 2017, 2021
- ^ at Division III level * at Division II level

The Monmouth Hawks men's basketball team represents Monmouth University in West Long Branch, New Jersey, United States. The school's team currently competes in the Coastal Athletic Association. They are currently led by head coach King Rice and play their home games at the OceanFirst Bank Center. The Hawks had wins over five power conference opponents (UCLA, Notre Dame, USC, Georgetown, and Rutgers) and received votes in the AP poll for the first time ever during the 2015–16 season. They last appeared in the NCAA tournament in 2006.

== Postseason ==
=== NCAA Division I Tournament results ===
The Hawks have appeared in four NCAA Division I men's basketball tournaments. Their combined record is 1–4.

Year	Seed	Round	Opponent	Result
1996	13	First round	No. 4 Marquette	L 44–68
2001	16	First round	No. 1 Duke	L 52–95
2004	15	First round	No. 2 Mississippi State	L 52–85
2006	16	Opening Round; First round	No. 16 Hampton; No. 1 Villanova	W 71–49; L 45–58

=== NIT results ===
The Hawks have appeared in two National Invitation Tournaments. Their combined record is 1–2.

Year	Round	Opponent	Result
2016	First round Second Round	Bucknell; George Washington	W 90–80; L 71–87
2017	First round	Ole Miss	L 83–91

=== NCAA Division II tournament results ===
The Hawks have appeared in two NCAA Division II men's basketball tournaments. Their combined record is 1–3.

Year	Round	Opponent	Result
1981	Regional semifinals Regional 3rd-place game	Clarion; Bloomsburg	L 78–80; W 79–64
1982	Regional semifinals Regional 3rd Place	Cheyney; Edinboro	L 53–66; L 53–56

=== NCAA Division III tournament results ===
The Hawks have appeared in one NCAA Division III tournament. Their combined record is 1–1.

Year	Round	Opponent	Result
1976	Regional semifinals Regional Finals	Lynchburg; Shepard	W 97–73; L 71–79

=== NAIA tournament results ===
The Hawks have appeared in five NAIA tournaments. Their record is 3–5.

Year	Round	Opponent	Result
1966	First round	Midwestern State	L 92–94
1968	First round Second Round	Bishop; Westminster (PA)	W 102–91; L 69–70
1969	First round Second Round; Quarterfinals	Central State; Asheville-Biltmore; Maryland-Eastern Shore	W 63–59; W 115–81; L 94–99
1974	First round	Missouri Western	L 84–96
1975	First round	Marymount (KS)	L 72–86

== Awards ==
All-Americans

- Rahsaan Johnson* – 2001
- Blake Hamilton* – 2005
- Justin Robinson* - 2016, 2017

(*) Denotes Honorable Mention

Metro Atlantic Athletic Conference Player of the Year

- Justin Robinson – 2016, 2017

Metro Atlantic Athletic Conference Coach of the Year

- King Rice – 2016, 2017

Northeast Conference Player of the Year

- Rahsaan Johnson – 2001
- Blake Hamilton – 2005
