= Thomas Green =

Thomas Green may refer to:

== Academics ==
- Thomas Green (master) (fl. 1520s), English academic, vice-chancellor of the University of Cambridge
- Thomas F. Green (1927–2006), American educational theorist and philosopher
- T. H. Green (Thomas Hill Green, 1836–1882), English philosopher

== Military ==
- Thomas Green (general) (1814–1864), Confederate general after whom Tom Green County, Texas was named
- Thomas H. Green (1889–1971), American military officer
- Thomas M. Green Sr. (1723–1805), colonel in the American Revolutionary War

== Politics and law ==
- Thomas C. Green (1820–1889), justice of the Supreme Court of Appeals of West Virginia
- Thomas Jefferson Green (1802–1863), American politician
- Thomas M. Green Jr. (1758–1813), delegate to the United States Congress from Mississippi Territory

== Sports ==
- Thomas Green (canoeist) (born 1999), Australian sprint kayaker
- Thomas D. Green (1848–1935), Canadian amateur ice hockey player

== Others ==
- Sir Thomas Green (1461–1506), grandfather of Katherine Parr, last wife of Henry VIII
- Thomas Green (bishop) (1658–1738), English Anglican bishop of Norwich
- Thomas Green (Blessed), one of the Carthusian martyrs
- Thomas Green (captain) (1679/80–1705), English sailor and alleged pirate, hanged in Scotland
- Thomas Green (geologist) (c. 1738–1788), English geologist and Woodwardian Professor of Geology
- Thomas Green (pastor) (1761–1814), American minister
- Thomas Green (sculptor) (c.1659-1730) English sculptor
- Thomas Louis Green (1799–1883), English Catholic priest and apologist
- Thomas R. G. Green (born 1941), British cognitive scientist
- Thomas Green (CSA) (died 1883), lawyer widely regarded as a sympathizer and even espionage agent on behalf of the Confederate States of America
- Thomas H. Green (Jesuit) (1932–2009), American Jesuit, spiritual director, educator and author

== Other uses ==
- Thomas Green & Son, engineers who manufactured a wide range of products at the Smithfield Foundry, Leeds, United Kingdom

== See also ==
- Tom Green (disambiguation)
- Thomas Greene (disambiguation)
- Thomas Green Clemson (1807–1888), U.S. politician
- Thom Green (born 1991), Australian dancer and actor
- Thom Sonny Green, English drummer and electronic music producer
