= Gilbert Luis R. Centina III =

Filipino-American Roman Catholic poet (1947–2020)

The Reverend Gilbert Luis R. Centina III OSA
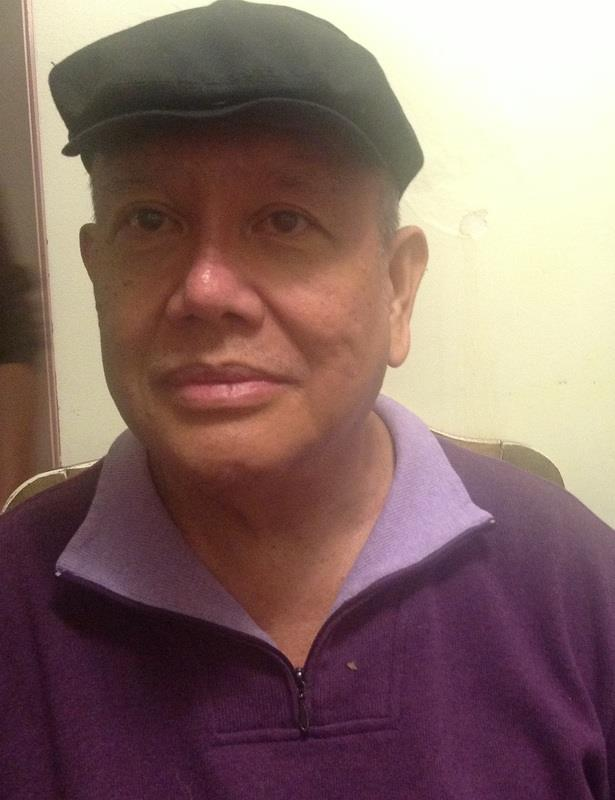
- Born: May 19, 1947; La Carlota, Negros Occidental, Philippines
- Died: May 1, 2020 (aged 72); León, Spain
- Education: University of the Philippines, University of Santo Tomas
- Occupations: Roman Catholic priest, author
- Writing career
- Language: English, Spanish, Hiligaynon, Tagalog
- Genres: Fiction, poetry, nonfiction
- Subjects: Clericalism, Christian poetry, novels, and mysticism
- Notable works: Rubrics and Runes, Glass of Liquid Truths, Somewhen, Triptych and Collected Poems, Getxo and Other Poems, "Diptych/Díptico"
- Website: gilbertluisrcentinaiii.com

Gilbert Luis Ramos Centina III, OSA (May 19, 1947 – May 1, 2020) was a Filipino-American Catholic priest and poet who authored nine poetry books, two novels and a book of literary criticism. He was a member of the Augustinians.

His works have been anthologized in Philippine high school and college textbooks and published in the Philippines, Spain, Canada and the United States. Besides English, he also wrote in Spanish and in two Philippine languages, Hiligaynon and Tagalog. He received the Catholic Authors Award in 1996 from the Asian Catholic Publishers and the Archdiocese of Manila under Cardinal Jaime Sin.

For his body of poetic work in Spanish, he was posthumously awarded the Premio José Rizal de las Letras Filipinas after his death in 2020.

== Biography ==
=== Early life and education ===
Born in La Carlota City on May 19, 1947, he was the second child of Luis T. Centina Jr., an educator, and Eva Gómez Ramos, a homemaker. He came from a family of artists, according to his biography in his official web site. His father, an educator, contributed articles to national magazines in the Philippines and authored a posthumously published book, Almost on the Carpet. One of his two younger sisters is a painter while two of his four brothers are poets. His artistic bent drew inspiration from a childhood surrounded with charcoal etchings by his maternal grandfather.

After graduating from La Carlota High School, he attended a number of colleges in his freshman year in university, including La Consolacion College Bacolod in Bacolod City, University of Negros Occidental - Recoletos, also in the same city, and University of San Agustin in Iloilo City.

=== Entering religious life ===
In 1964, he entered the Augustinian Monastery in historic Intramuros, Manila and attended the University of Santo Tomas, the Philippines' royal and pontifical university. He graduated cum laude in each of his four ecclesiastical degrees from the University of Santo Tomas: BA classical, Ph.B., STB, and STL.

He earned his MA in comparative literature at the University of the Philippines-Diliman and completed the coursework toward a Ph.D. in comparative literature at another state university but left without completing his dissertation.

Centina was an Augustinian friar under the Spanish circumscription of the Madrid-based Augustinian Province of the Most Holy Name of Jesus of the Philippines. In 2020, he became a charter member of the Augustinian Province of St. John of Sahagún of Spain which was formed when the Philippine province and three other provinces in Spain and Portugal united into a single circumscription.

After his ordination to the priesthood, he briefly served as a missionary in Peru. He taught literature as a professorial lecturer, served as a school chaplain for many years and as the first pastor of Filipino ancestry of Holy Rosary Church (Manhattan) in East Harlem, New York.

The National Catholic Reporter noted that he was "a celebrated Catholic author and poet, [whose] accolades include the Palanca Memorial Awards, the Philippines’ highest literary honor, in English poetry in 1974, the Focus Literary Awards in English poetry in 1982, and the Catholic Authors Award in 1996 from the Archdiocese of Manila under then Cardinal Jaime L. Sin and the Asian Catholic Publishers." His work, it added, was "a conscience that attacks and spares no one except the weak. It is full of intrinsic insights into humanity and its connection with a greater being. His work explores the relationship between man and his Creator, between space and time, and between the earthly and heavenly continuums of life, alongside our overwhelming shared sense of love, courage and hope."

His first novel is a roman à clef, written under a nom de plume. The novel, Wages of Sin, was published as a limited edition in Honolulu in 1988.

=== Move to Spain ===
After moving to Spain, on April 7, 2013, Centina published Somewhen in the United States, his third poetry book. Portland Book Review described Somewhen as "modern poetry at its best," adding that "for modern poetry to be this eloquent and thought provoking is a grave task that Centina III accomplishes splendidly." Sacramento Book Review called the book "lyrical" and "positively radiant" and noted that it is "deeply rooted in religious history, mythology and mysticism." The collection, it added, "honors the [Catholic] church's fortitude, individual spirit and conviction, belief and the voyage thereof."

The collection marked his comeback to poetry writing after a long hiatus that followed his winning the Focus Literary Awards in poetry in 1982. Along the way, he devoted himself to his priestly duties and limited his writing to newspaper columns. During this time, he served as editor-in-chief of Search, a journal on the life and works of Augustine of Hippo published in Makati, Philippines, by Colegio San Agustin-Makati. Somewhen was followed by the publication of Rubrics and Runes (New York: June 2013), Triptych and Collected Poems (New York: August 2013) and Getxo and Other Poems (New York: January 2014). His earlier books of poems, Our Hidden Glaxette and Glass of Liquid Truths, were also republished in May 2013.

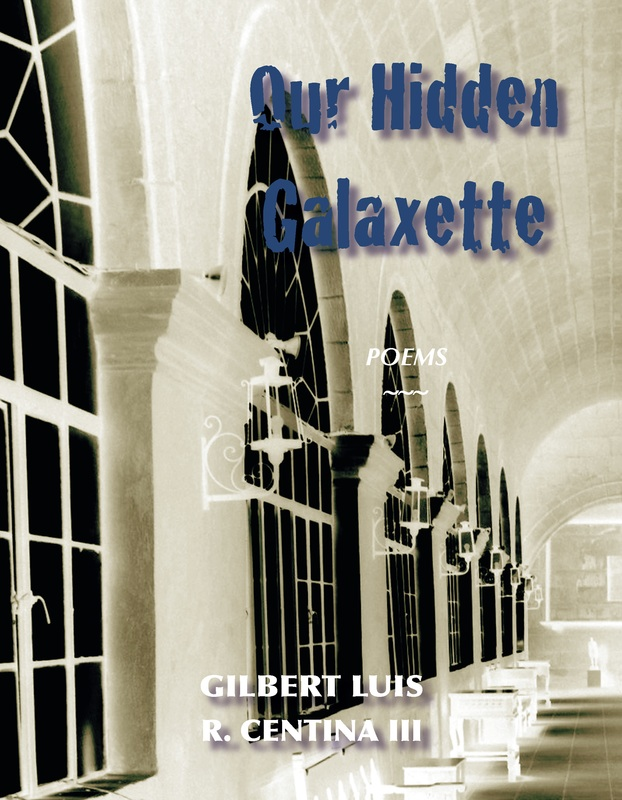
Our Hidden Galaxette

On June 20, 2013, he released under his real name his controversial second novel Rubrics and Runes, a satire tackling clericalism, simony, financial shenanigans and sex abuse in the Catholic Church as perpetrated by some misguided churchmen.

According to the blurb of Rubrics and Runes, it "tells the story of a friar who gets caught in the maelstrom of conventual and secular politics when the two supposedly incongruous worlds collide. When José Morán entered the monastery, it was to pursue the highest form of chivalry. But his fate as a religious priest takes a precipitous turn when social paroxysm grips the fictional island-nation of Islas e Islotes after the downfall of the government. To cover up his own misdeeds, his abominably corrupt religious superior leading a double life seizes the ensuing chaos and collaborates with human rights violators in military uniform to accuse the completely innocent friar of a fabricated heinous crime. The plot unravels as those who claim to follow Christ wade into politics, taking for granted his injunction to 'render therefore unto Caesar the things which are Caesar’s and unto God the things that are God’s.'"

In an article titled "Una Perspectiva Históríca de la Poesía Hispanofilipina" that he wrote for Universidad de Murcia, Edmundo Farolan, poet and correspondent of the Real Academia Española, cited Centina's poetry in Spanish as belonging to an avant-garde group of Filipino poets who “in addition to Castilian...write in other languages and in different styles and themes—free verse and prose, to traditional metrics surrealist themes, Dadaists and protest, realistic subjects, religious and serene. Avant-garde, but returning to the castellano classics: Quevedo, Gongora, Santa Teresa de Jesus, Manrique and Garcilaso de la Vega."

In May 2017, he published Diptych/Díptico, his first bilingual (English-Spanish) poetry collection. Midwest Book Review'praised the book as a "beautiful synthesis of poetry, philosophy, spirituality and psychological inspection that is well illustrated especially recommended for poetry readers who seek a journey from individual inspection to universal spiritual truth..." In December 2017, Centina came out with Spiritual Quest in Verse: A Literary Criticism of Ricardo Demetillo's Religious Poetry.

Centina's time in Spain was marked with an explosion of creativity, resulting in the publication of six poetry books, a novel and a book of literary criticism. Such was the intensity of his creativity that in less than a year, he was able to produce three poetry books: Madre España, which he released in July 2019, quickly followed by Plus Ultra and Other Poems, which was published in January 2020 and Recovecos/Crevices, which he completed two weeks prior to his death and was posthumously published in August 2020.

These three books were produced under very difficult circumstances for Centina who struggled with his health after a difficult kidney transplant surgery in June 2018 at Bilbao's Cruces Hospital, where he underwent seven surgeries in a span of one month as surgeons struggled to fix a leaking bladder that was causing him constant infections. In the end, they attached a nephrostomy tube to his new kidney into a collecting bag outside his body. He hinted about his health problems in the preface to his book Madre España, in which he thanked the Spanish people for their generosity: "I am writing this a year to the day I underwent a life-saving surgery, full of gratitude in my heart for the hospitality and the generosity of the Spanish people, which have sustained me in my long and continuing journey to recovery. Their selflessness exemplifies the nobility of their Iberian roots."

Author and award-winning poet Thomas R. Caffrey, in his introduction to Recovecos/Crevices, praised the book: "In his rhythmic verse the script artist strikes a chord that reverberates throughout us, transforming the mechanistic words into vibrant song and our stasis into action. Today’s brain science has discovered what the psalmists, poets and ancient musicians could only know by intuition: that music, melody or verse stimulate us to movement and emotion. We become unstuck. Our losing streak ends. Whether in grief or joy, our prayers become that green and fruitful oasis."

Durling his life, Centina authored hundreds of newspaper columns and magazine articles as well as edited a scholarly journal on St. Augustine and contributed poetry and fiction to literary publications.

=== Death ===
Centina died in 2020 during the COVID-19 pandemic in Spain. His assignment at the Augustinian-run parish of Our Lady of Mt. Carmel in Neguri near Bilbao was cut short by an illness which necessitated his transfer to Colegio Andrés de Urdaneta in Loui, Vizcaya in September 2018 and to Colegio de Nuestra Madre del Buen Consejo in León in July the following year. He was 72 years old.

At the time of his death on May 1, 2020, from complications of COVID-19 in the northwestern city of León, Spain, Centina had just completed his ninth poetry collection, Recovecos/Crevices. The poetry book, which contains three hundred fifty poems in Spanish and English, is his third bilingual poetry collection. He started producing bilingual books in English and Spanish after rediscovering his Spanish roots in Spain, where he was assigned from 2013 until his death in 2020 and where he found a receptive and growing audience.

== Defender of the Spanish language ==
For his efforts to preserve the Spanish language in the Philippines through his essays and poetry, he was praised as a "defender of the Spanish language" in that country.

After his death, ABC, the Spanish newspaper of record, hailed Centina in its May 12, 2020 issue (p. 54) as "a defender of the Spanish language" in his native Philippines: "As an advocate for the preservation of the Spanish language in the Philippines, Father Centina supported the work of Hispanists to 'spread, defend and exalt' the Spanish language in that country. It is from this noble cause that he obtained his inspiration to write his bilingual poetry books in Spanish and English. For more than three centuries - it can be recalled - the Philippines formed a treasured part of the Spanish Empire," adding that "his large body of work assures him a solid place in Philippine literature in English and Spanish, as well as in Catholic poetry."

Diario de León echoed ABC's observation, saying "he was a well-known and award winning poet and author who fought for the preservation of the Spanish language in his homeland, asserting that the Spanish roots of the Philippines form the core of his country's cultural soul."

== Legacy ==
As a testament to his importance as a writer, he was included among the most notable Augustinian men and women since the founding of the order in 1244 in a seminal encyclopedia compiled and edited by Spanish author and academic Rafael Lazcano, arguably the foremost expert on the Augustinian Order in the world.

== Works ==
Poetry:

- Our Hidden Galaxette, [first edition, Manila: 1970; second edition, New York: 2013].
- Glass of Liquid Truths [first and second editions, Makati: 1974; third international deluxe edition, Iloilo City: 1979; fourth edition and first printing in the United States, New York: 2013].
- Somewhen [New York: 2013].
- Triptych and Collected Poems [New York: 2013].
- Getxo and Other Poems [New York: 2014].
- Diptych/Díptico [New York: 2017].
- Spiritual Quest in Verse [New York: 2017].
- Madre España and Other Poems [New York: 2019].
- Plus ultra y otros poemas/Plus Ultra and Other Poems [New York: 2020].
- Recovecos/Crevices [New York: 2020].

Novels:

- Wages of Sin [Honolulu: 1988].
- Rubrics and Runes [New York: 2013].

Literary criticism:
• Spiritual Quest in Verse: A Literary Criticism of Ricaredo Demetillo's Religious Poetry [New York: 2017).
Copy Editor, John Paul II in Iloilo [Iloilo City: Roman Catholic Archdiocese of Jaro, 1981].

- Editor (2002–05), Search, The Augustinian Journal of Cultural Excellence.

== Awards ==
- Catholic Authors Award, 1996
- Focus Philippines Literary Awards, poetry, 1982
- Don Carlos Palanca Memorial Awards for Literature, English poetry, 1974
- University of Santo Tomas Annual Rector's Literary Prizes, English poetry and short story, 1969
- Named outstanding chaplain of the Philippines, Knights of Columbus, Manila, 2000
- VI Premio José Rizal de las Letras Filipinas 2020
- 2023 Parangal Hagbong, The Varsitarian, University of Santo Tomas.
