= Thomas Greene =

Thomas Greene may refer to:

- Sir Thomas Green (c. 1461–1506), or Greene, grandfather of Katherine Parr, last wife of Henry VIII
- Thomas Greene (governor) (1609–1651), proprietary governor of the colony of Maryland, 1647–1648/1649
- Thomas Green (bishop), or Greene, bishop of Ely, 1723–1738
- Thomas Christopher Greene (born 1968), American novelist
- Thomas M. Green Jr. (1758–1813), or Greene, delegate to the United States Congress from Mississippi Territory
- Thomas A. Greene (1827–1894), amateur geologist
- Tom Greene (Florida politician) (born 1932), Florida state representative from 1963 to 1966, and state senator from 1966 to 1967
- Thomas Greene (Iowa politician) (born 1949), American politician in the Iowa State Senate
- Tom Greene (Louisiana politician) (born 1948), member of the Louisiana State Senate
- Tom Greene (American football) (born 1938), American football quarterback and punter
- Thomas Rea Greene (1904–1950), steamboat captain from Ohio
- Thomas Greene (MP) (1790–1871), British Member of Parliament for Lancaster
- Thomas McLernon Greene (1926–2003), American scholar of English literature
- Thomas Garland Greene, Canadian painter
- Fred Clifton (1844–1903), stage name of English opera singer and actor Thomas Huslea Greene

== See also ==
- Tommy Greene (born 1967), former Major League Baseball pitcher
- Thomas Green (disambiguation)
- Tom Green (disambiguation)
