= South Negros BioPower =

- Country: Philippines
- Location: La Carlota, Negros Occidental
- Coordinates: 10°25′23″N 122°56′13″E
- Status: operational
- Construction began: 1st quarter 2016
- Commission date: 4th quarter 2017

Thermal power station
- Primary fuel: Cane trash with some grassy and woody energy crop plants

Power generation
- Nameplate capacity: 25 MW

External links
- Website: www.snbiopower.com

South Negros BioPower is a biomass-fired power station in La Carlota, Negros Occidental in the Philippines. It is among the biggest biomass power stations in the Philippines and has a generating capacity of 25 megawatts, enough electricity to provide 265,000 people in the region’s urban centres and rural areas on the island of Negros. The estimated reduction of CO_{2} is more than 20,000 metric tons per year. The power plant is a cooperation between ThomasLloyd CTI Asia Holdings Pte and Bronzeoak Philippines. General Contractor is Wuxi Huaguang Electric Power Engineering.

The plant is primary feed with cane trash with some grassy and woody energy crop plants. The feedstock utilisation is 220,000 tonnes per year with a local feedstock availability of 1.4 million tonnes per year within a 50 km-radius catchment area. The plant is connected to an existing 69 kV substation in San Enrique, 8 km away when operational. The power plant created 675 new jobs in the plant and 2,500 jobs in feedstock production and collection.

The plant has been chosen by the Philippine government as an "Awarded Biomass Project" in January 2015.

== See also ==
- North Negros BioPower
