= Tom Green (disambiguation) =

Tom Green (born 1971) is a Canadian actor, comedian, talk show host and media personality.

Tom Green or Tommy Green may also refer to:

== Sports ==
=== Association football ===
- Tommy Green (footballer, born 1863) (1863–1923), English footballer for Aston Villa
- Tommy Green (footballer, born 1873) (1873–1921), English footballer for West Bromwich Albion
- Tommy Green (footballer, born 1876) (1876–1958), English footballer for New Brighton Tower, Liverpool, Middlesbrough and Stockport County
- Tommy Green (footballer, born 1893) (1893–1975), English footballer for West Ham United, Accrington Stanley, Stockport County and Clapton Orient
- Tommy Green (footballer, born 1913) (1913–1997), English footballer for West Bromwich Albion

=== Other sports ===
- Tommy Green (athlete) (1894–1975), British race walker
- Tom Green (basketball) (born 1949), American college basketball coach
- Tom Green (footballer, born 1909) (1909–1979), Australian rules footballer for Hawthorn
- Tom Green (footballer, born 2001), Australian rules footballer for Greater Western Sydney
- Tom Green (golfer) (1900–1974), Welsh golfer
- Tom Green (runner) (born 1950/1), American marathon runner

== Others ==
- Tom Green (artist) (1913–1980), Australian artist
- Tom Green (attorney) (born 1941/2), American defense lawyer
- Tom Green (designer) (fl. 1964), designer and driver of the land speed record holder Wingfoot Express
- Tom Green (polygamist) (1948–2021), American Mormon fundamentalist in Utah who practiced plural marriage
- Tom Patrick Green (1942–2012), American painter and art professor

== Other uses ==
- Tom Green County, Texas, American geographic designation
- USS Tom Green County, a Terrebonne Parish-class tank landing ship built for the United States Navy, named for the county

== See also ==
- Thom Green (born 1991), Australian dancer and actor
- Thom Sonny Green, English drummer and electronic music producer
- Thomas Green (disambiguation)
- Thomas Greene (disambiguation)
- Tommie Green (1956–2015), American basketball player
