= Thomas H. Green (Jesuit) =

Theologian and philosopher (1932–2009)

Thomas Henry Green SJ (March 19, 1932, in Rochester, New York – March 13, 2009, in Manila, Philippines) was an American Jesuit, spiritual director, educator and author of spiritual books. He taught primarily in the Philippines.

== Early life ==
Thomas Henry Green was the son of George Charles (d. 1973) and Marie Margaret Green (d. 1990). After graduating from Catholic The Aquinas Institute of Rochester, he entered the noviciate of the Society of Jesus in Poughkeepsie on September 7, 1949. He studied Philosophy and Theology at Bellarmine College in Plattsburgh, New York, and at Woodstock College in Maryland. At Fordham University he earned a M.A. degree in education (1957) and a M.S. degree in Physics (1960). On June 19, 1963, he was ordained to the priesthood. In 1968, he received his doctorate (PhD) in Philosophy of science from the University of Notre Dame under Ernan McMullin.

== Career ==
Green's teaching career began in the Philippines in 1956, first as a High-School teacher at Ateneo De Cagayan (1956–1958), then as a professor of philosophy and pastoral theology at the Ateneo de Manila University in Manila from 1969, and at the Loyola School of Theology from 1971.

On his return from doctoral studies to the Philippines in 1968, he was fluent in Tagalog and celebrated Holy Mass in that language. From 1970, he was spiritual director of novices at San José Seminary in Quezon City, as well as vice-rector of the seminary from 1995.

He gave lectures and retreats in Australia, Canada, Malaysia, the US and the UK.

Green was a member of the American Catholic Philosophical Association, the British Society for the Philosophy of Science and the Philosophy of Science Association.

Over 23 years, Green published nine books on prayer and spiritual direction, which went into as many as 16 editions and were translated into multiple languages. Posthumously, a collection of Green's lectures was published under the title Experiencing God.

In 1989 he was awarded the Catholic Authors Award by Asian Catholic Publishers, initiated by Cardinal Sin.

On October 5, 2022, Pope Francis quoted from Green's 1984 book Weeds among the Wheat in his catechesis on the Examination of conscience at the papal general audience.

== Selected publications ==
- Opening to God, A guide to prayer. Ave Maria Press, Notre Dame, Indiana 1977
- When the well runs dry, Prayer beyond the beginnings. Ave Maria Press, 1979
- Darkness in the marketplace: The Christian at prayer in the world. Ave Maria Press, 1981
- Weeds among the wheat: Discernment – Where prayer and action meet. Ave Maria Press, 1984
- A vacation with the Lord: A personal, directed retreat. Ave Maria Press, 1986
- Come down Zachaeus. Spirituality and the laity. Ave Maria Press, 1988
- Drinking from a dry well. Ave Maria Press, 1991
- Prayer and common sense. Ave Maria Press, 1995
