= 2004–05 St. Francis Terriers men's basketball team =

American college basketball season

2004–05 St. Francis Terriers men's basketball
- Conference: Northeast Conference
- Record: 13–15 (9–9 NEC)
- Head coach: Ron Ganulin (14th season)
- Home arena: Generoso Pope Athletic Complex

2004–05 Northeast Conference men's basketball standings
	Conf.				Overall
Team	W		L	PCT	W		L	PCT
Monmouth	14	–	4	.778	16	–	13	.552
Fairleigh Dickinson †	13	–	5	.722	20	–	13	.606
Robert Morris	11	–	7	.611	14	–	15	.483
Long Island	10	–	8	.556	14	–	15	.483
Saint Francis (PA)	10	–	8	.556	15	–	13	.536
Wagner	10	–	8	.556	13	–	17	.433
St. Francis (NY)	9	–	9	.500	13	–	15	.464
Central Connecticut	8	–	10	.444	12	–	16	.429
Quinnipiac	6	–	12	.333	10	–	17	.370
Mount St. Mary's	5	–	13	.278	7	–	20	.259
Sacred Heart	3	–	15	.167	4	–	23	.148
† 2005 NEC tournament winner

The 2004–05 St. Francis Terriers men's basketball team represented St. Francis College during the 2004–05 NCAA Division I men's basketball season. The team was coached by Ron Ganulin, who was in his fourteenth year at the helm of the St. Francis Terriers. The Terrier's home games were played at the Generoso Pope Athletic Complex. The team has been a member of the Northeast Conference since 1981.

The Terriers were chosen to finish 7th in the NEC Preseason Coaches Poll. The team finished at 13–15 overall and 9–9 in conference play to take the 7th seed as predicted. The Terriers qualified for the NEC tournament losing in the quarter-finals to Fairleigh Dickinson 60–78. After the season Ron Ganulin was fired as head coach of the program.

== Roster ==
2004–05 St. Francis Brooklyn Terriers men's basketball team
Players
Coaches

Pos.	#	Name	Height	Weight	Year	Hometown
G	3	Tory Cavalieri	6 ft 0 in (1.83 m)	180 lb (82 kg)	Sr	Atlantic City, NJ
F	25	Damien Herard	6 ft 7 in (2.01 m)	225 lb (102 kg)	Sr	Jamaica, NY
G	11	Rob Wiatre	5 ft 11 in (1.8 m)	180 lb (82 kg)	Sr	Brooklyn, NY
G/F	13	Christian Brown	6 ft 4 in (1.93 m)	190 lb (86 kg)	Jr	Manhattan, NY
F	21	Devon Neckles	6 ft 7 in (2.01 m)	190 lb (86 kg)	Jr	Brooklyn, NY
G	2	Tristan Smith	6 ft 1 in (1.85 m)	185 lb (84 kg)	Jr	Amityville, NY
G	42	Nick Jones	6 ft 2 in (1.88 m)	195 lb (88 kg)	Jr	St. Albans, NY
G/F	34	Nikola Traykov	6 ft 5 in (1.96 m)	205 lb (93 kg)	Jr	Blagoevgrad, Bulgaria
G	4	Tom Czaplinski	6 ft 1 in (1.85 m)	180 lb (82 kg)	So	Brooklyn, NY
C	50	Brian Frankly	6 ft 8 in (2.03 m)	240 lb (109 kg)	So	Brooklyn, NY
G	14	Ruandy Melo	6 ft 0 in (1.83 m)	160 lb (73 kg)	Fr	Manhattan, NY
F	10	Sami Pekkola	6 ft 7 in (2.01 m)	220 lb (100 kg)	Fr	Lahti, Finland
G/F	15	Allan Sheppard	6 ft 5 in (1.96 m)	200 lb (91 kg)	Fr	Manhattan, NY
F	40	James St. Robert	6 ft 8 in (2.03 m)	230 lb (104 kg)	Fr	Copiague, NY

Head coach

- Ron Ganulin (LIU Brooklyn '67)

Assistant coach(es)

Legend

- (C) Team captain
- (S) Suspended
- (I) Ineligible
- (W) Walk-on
- Injured
- Current redshirt

== Schedule and results ==
Date time, TV	Opponent	Result	Record	Site (attendance) city, state
Regular season
November 20, 2004*; 7:00 pm	at Fordham	L 62–83	0–1	Rose Hill Gym; Bronx, NY
November 23, 2004*; 7:30 pm	at St. John's (NY)	W 53–52	1–1	Carnesecca Arena (5,149); Queens, NY
November 30, 2004*; 7:00 pm	at Binghamton	L 63–71	1–2	Binghamton University Events Center (2,606); Vestal, NY
December 4, 2004*; 7:00 pm	Army	W 78–64	2–2	Generoso Pope Athletic Complex (683); Brooklyn, NY
December 8, 2004*; 7:30 pm	at Seton Hall	L 56–57	2–3	Izod Center (6,159); East Rutherford, NJ
December 11, 2004*; 4:00 pm	Columbia	L 57–65	2–4	Generoso Pope Athletic Complex (428); Brooklyn, NY
December 23, 2004*; 7:00 pm	at Saint Peter's	L 58–70	2–5	Yanitelli Center (575); Jersey City, NJ
December 28, 2004*; 8:00 pm	at Cornell	W 70–63	3–5	Newman Arena (587); Ithaca, NY
January 4, 2005*; 7:00 pm	Lafayette	W 79–64	4–5	Generoso Pope Athletic Complex (243); Brooklyn, NY
January 6, 2005; 7:30 pm	at Robert Morris	W 62–53	4–6 (0–1)	Charles L. Sewall Center (438); Moon Township, PA
January 8, 2005; 4:00 pm	Central Connecticut State	W 75–56	5–6 (1–1)	Generoso Pope Athletic Complex (367); Brooklyn, NY
January 12, 2005; 8:00 pm	at Long Island	L 69–74	5–7 (1–2)	Schwartz Athletic Center (685); Brooklyn, NY
January 15, 2005; 4:00 pm	Sacred Heart	W 78–66	6–7 (2–2)	Generoso Pope Athletic Complex (395); Brooklyn, NY
January 17, 2005; 7:00 pm	Saint Francis (PA)	W 82–71	7–7 (3–2)	Generoso Pope Athletic Complex (318); Brooklyn, NY
January 20, 2005; 7:00 pm	at Quinnipiac	W 69–63	8–7 (4–2)	Burt Kahn Court (1,007); Hamden, CT
January 26, 2005; 7:00 pm	at Monmouth	L 73–77	8–8 (4–3)	William T. Boylan Gymnasium (1,550); West Long Branch, NJ
January 29, 2005; 7:00 pm	at Mount St. Mary's	L 85–88	8–9 (4–4)	Knott Arena (1,562); Emmitsburg, MD
February 3, 2005; 6:00 pm	Robert Morris	L 63–68	8–10 (4–5)	Generoso Pope Athletic Complex (489); Brooklyn, NY
February 5, 2005; 7:00 pm	at Fairleigh Dickinson	L 54–78	8–11 (4–6)	Rothman Center (1,825); Hackensack, NJ
February 10, 2005; 7:00 pm	Long Island; Battle of Brooklyn	W 77–68	9–11 (5–6)	Generoso Pope Athletic Complex (683); Brooklyn, NY
February 12, 2005; 8:00 pm	Wagner	L 61–62	9–12 (5–7)	Generoso Pope Athletic Complex (749); Brooklyn, NY
February 15, 2005; 7:00 pm	at Sacred Heart	W 89–83	10–12 (6–7)	William H. Pitt Center (547); Fairfield, CT
February 17, 2005; 7:00 pm	at Central Connecticut State	W 86–76	11–12 (7–7)	William H. Detrick Gymnasium (1,652); New Britain, CT
February 19, 2005; 4:00 pm	Mount St. Mary's	W 82–77	12–12 (8–7)	Generoso Pope Athletic Complex (462); Brooklyn, NY
February 21, 2005; 7:00 pm	Fairleigh Dickinson	W 110–103	13–12 (9–7)	Generoso Pope Athletic Complex (516); Brooklyn, NY
February 25, 2005; 8:00 pm	at Wagner	L 54–60	13–13 (9–8)	Spiro Sports Center (1,877); Staten Island, NY
February 28, 2005; 7:00 pm	Monmouth	L 56–64	13–14 (9–9)	Generoso Pope Athletic Complex (423); Brooklyn, NY
2005 NEC tournament
March 3, 2005; 7:00 pm	at Fairleigh Dickinson; Quarterfinals	L 60–78	13–15	Rothman Center (1,013); Hackensack, NJ
*Non-conference game. ^{#}Rankings from AP Poll. (#) Tournament seedings in parentheses.
