= 1984–85 Fairleigh Dickinson Knights men's basketball team =

American college basketball season

1984–85 Fairleigh Dickinson Knights men's basketball
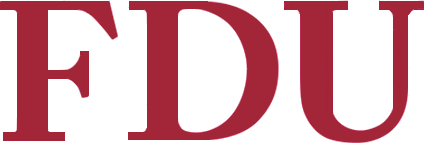

ECAC Metro tournament champions

NCAA tournament, First Round
- Conference: ECAC Metro
- Record: 21–10 (10–4 ECAC-M)
- Head coach: Tom Green (2nd season)
- Home arena: FDU Gym

1984–85 ECAC Metro men's basketball standings
	Conf.				Overall
Team	W		L	PCT	W		L	PCT
Marist	11	–	3	.786	17	–	12	.586
Fairleigh Dickinson †	10	–	4	.714	21	–	10	.677
Long Island	9	–	5	.643	15	–	13	.536
Loyola (MD)	8	–	6	.571	16	–	14	.533
Saint Francis (PA)	6	–	8	.429	9	–	19	.321
Wagner	5	–	9	.357	11	–	17	.393
Robert Morris	4	–	10	.286	9	–	19	.321
St. Francis (NY)	3	–	11	.214	7	–	21	.250
† 1985 ECAC Metro tournament winner Rankings from AP Poll

The 1984–85 Fairleigh Dickinson Knights men's basketball team represented Fairleigh Dickinson University during the 1984–85 NCAA Division I men's basketball season. The team was led by second-year head coach Tom Green. The Knights played their home games at the FDU Gym in Hackensack, New Jersey as members of the ECAC Metro Conference.

The Knights compiled a 21–10 record and went 10–4 in ECAC Metro play to finish in second place. They defeated Robert Morris, Long Island, and Loyola (MD) to capture the ECAC Metro tournament championship as the 2-seed. By winning the ECAC Metro tournament, the Knights received the conference's automatic bid to the NCAA tournament as No. 16 seed in the Southeast region. The Knights lost a close game to 1-seed Michigan, 59–55, in the opening round.

== Roster ==
1984–85 Fairleigh Dickinson Knights men's basketball team
Players	Coaches
Pos. / # / Name / Height / Weight / Year / Hometown; F / / Larry Hampton / 6 ft 4 in (1.93 m) / — / Sr	Head coach: Tom Green; Assistant coach(es) Legend: (C) Team captain; (S) Suspended; (I) Ineligible; (W) Walk-on; Injured; Current redshirt; Roster

== Schedule and results ==
Date time, TV	Rank^{#}	Opponent^{#}	Result	Record	Site (attendance) city, state
Regular season
Feb 4, 1985*		Navy	L 74–83	11–8	FDU Gym; Hackensack, New Jersey
ECAC Metro tournament
Mar 2, 1985*		vs. Robert Morris; Quarterfinals	W 65–49	19–9	Reitz Arena; Baltimore, Maryland
Mar 3, 1985*		vs. Long Island; Semifinals	W 73–71	20–9	Reitz Arena; Baltimore, Maryland
Mar 4, 1985*		at Loyola (MD); Championship game	W 63–59	21–9	Reitz Arena; Baltimore, Maryland
NCAA tournament
Mar 15, 1985*	(16 SE)	vs. (1 SE) No. 2 Michigan; First Round	L 55–59	21–10	University of Dayton Arena; Dayton, Ohio
*Non-conference game. ^{#}Rankings from AP Poll. (#) Tournament seedings in parentheses. SE=Southeast Source. All times are in Eastern Time.
