= 2005 Northeast Conference men's basketball tournament =

- Classification: Division I
- Season: 2004–05
- Teams: 8
- Site: Campus sites
- Finals site: Rothman Center; Hackensack, NJ
- Champions: Fairleigh Dickinson (4th title)
- Winning coach: Tom Green (4th title)
- MVP: Tamien Trent (Fairleigh Dickinson)

2004–05 Northeast Conference men's basketball standings
	Conf.				Overall
Team	W		L	PCT	W		L	PCT
Monmouth	14	–	4	.778	16	–	13	.552
Fairleigh Dickinson †	13	–	5	.722	20	–	13	.606
Robert Morris	11	–	7	.611	14	–	15	.483
Long Island	10	–	8	.556	14	–	15	.483
Saint Francis (PA)	10	–	8	.556	15	–	13	.536
Wagner	10	–	8	.556	13	–	17	.433
St. Francis (NY)	9	–	9	.500	13	–	15	.464
Central Connecticut	8	–	10	.444	12	–	16	.429
Quinnipiac	6	–	12	.333	10	–	17	.370
Mount St. Mary's	5	–	13	.278	7	–	20	.259
Sacred Heart	3	–	15	.167	4	–	23	.148
† 2005 NEC tournament winner

The 2005 Northeast Conference men's basketball tournament was held in March. The tournament featured the league's top eight seeds. Fairleigh Dickinson won the championship, its fourth, and received the conferences automatic bid to the 2005 NCAA Tournament.

== Format ==
Departing from last years format, the NEC Men’s Basketball Tournament will consist of an eight-team playoff format with all games played at the home of the higher seed. After the quarterfinals, the teams will be reseeded so the highest remaining seed plays the lowest remaining seed in the semifinals.

== Bracket ==
Quarterfinals
1	Monmouth	54
8	Central Connecticut	53
2	Fairleigh Dickinson	78
7	St. Francis (NY)	60
(Pairings are reseeded after the first round)
3	Robert Morris	65
6	Wagner	69
4	Long Island	76
5	Saint Francis (PA)	67

Reseeded Semifinals
1	Monmouth	60
6	Wagner	63
2	Fairleigh Dickinson	70
4	Long Island	62

Championship Game
6	Wagner	52
2	Fairleigh Dickinson	58

== All-tournament team ==
Tournament MVP in bold.

**2005 NEC All-Tournament Team**

**Tamien Trent**, FDU
Mark Porter, WAGNER
Andrea Crosariol, FDU
Gordon Klaiber, FDU
Blake Hamilton, MONMOUTH
