= North Negros BioPower =

Philippine power station

- Country: Philippines
- Location: Manapla, Negros Occidental
- Coordinates: 10°56′41″N 123°10′2″E
- Status: operational
- Commission date: 4th quarter 2018

Thermal power station
- Primary fuel: Cane trash with some grassy and woody energy crop plants

Power generation
- Nameplate capacity: 25 MW

External links
- Website: www.snbiopower.com

North Negros BioPower is a biomass-fired power station in Manapla, Negros Occidental in the Philippines. It is among the biggest biomass power stations in the Philippines and has a generating capacity of 25 megawatts, enough electricity to provide 265,000 people in the region's urban centres and rural areas on the island of Negros. The power plant is a cooperation between ThomasLloyd CTI Asia Holdings Pte and Bronzeoak Philippines. General Contractor is Wuxi Huaguang Electric Power Engineering.

The plant is primarily fed with cane trash, with some grassy and woody energy crop plants. The feedstock utilisation is 220,000 tonnes per year with a local feedstock availability of 2.1 million tonnes per year within a 50 km-radius catchment area. The plant is connected to an existing 138 kV substation, 12 km away when operational. The power plant created 675 new jobs in the plant and 2,500 jobs in feedstock production and collection.

The facility was initially planned to be constructed in 2014 for commissioning in 2017 with the cost of about $114 million. The planned schedule for completion was moved to the third quarter of 2016. The planned commissioned date was moved once again to the fourth quarter of 2018 with construction of the facility set on the second quarter of 2017.

== See also ==
- South Negros BioPower
