= 1987–88 Fairleigh Dickinson Knights men's basketball team =

American college basketball season

1987–88 Fairleigh Dickinson Knights men's basketball
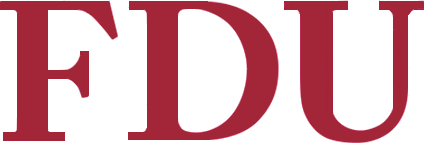

ECAC Metro Regular season champions ECAC Metro tournament champions

NCAA tournament, First Round
- Conference: ECAC Metro
- Record: 23–7 (13–3 ECAC-M)
- Head coach: Tom Green (5th season)
- Home arena: Rothman Center

1987–88 ECAC Metro men's basketball standings
	Conf.				Overall
Team	W		L	PCT	W		L	PCT
Fairleigh Dickinson†	13	–	3	.813	23	–	7	.767
Marist*	13	–	3	.813	18	–	9	.667
Monmouth	11	–	5	.688	16	–	13	.552
Robert Morris	9	–	7	.563	14	–	14	.500
Long Island	8	–	8	.500	14	–	14	.500
Loyola (MD)	6	–	10	.375	8	–	22	.267
St. Francis (NY)	5	–	11	.313	11	–	18	.379
Saint Francis (PA)	4	–	12	.250	7	–	20	.259
Wagner	3	–	13	.188	9	–	18	.333
† 1988 ECAC Metro tournament winner Rankings from AP Poll *Ineligible for conference tournament

The 1987–88 Fairleigh Dickinson Knights men's basketball team represented Fairleigh Dickinson University during the 1987–88 NCAA Division I men's basketball season. The team was led by fifth-year head coach Tom Green. The Knights played their home games at the Rothman Center in Hackensack, New Jersey as members of the ECAC Metro Conference.

The Knights compiled a 23–7 record and went 13–3 in ECAC Metro play to win the regular season conference title. They defeated Saint Francis (PA), Long Island University, and Monmouth to capture the ECAC Metro tournament championship. By winning the ECAC Metro tournament, the Knights received the conference's automatic bid to the NCAA tournament as No. 16 seed in the Midwest region. The Knights put up a fight but fell to 1-seed Purdue, 94–79, in the opening round.

== Roster ==
1987–88 Fairleigh Dickinson Knights men's basketball team
Players	Coaches
Pos. / # / Name / Height / Weight / Year / Hometown; F / / Damari Riddick / 6 ft 8 in (2.03 m) / — / Sr	Head coach: Tom Green; Assistant coach(es) Legend: (C) Team captain; (S) Suspended; (I) Ineligible; (W) Walk-on; Injured; Current redshirt; Roster

== Schedule and results ==
Date time, TV	Rank^{#}	Opponent^{#}	Result	Record	Site (attendance) city, state
Regular season
Nov 27, 1987*		Siena	W 77–69	1–0	Rothman Center; Hackensack, New Jersey
Dec 2, 1987*		at St. John's	L 60–82	1–1	Madison Square Garden; New York, New York
Dec 5, 1987*		at Maine	W 70–64	2–1	The Pit; Orono, Maine
Dec 12, 1987*		vs. Cleveland State	W 82–80	3–1	Brendan Byrne Arena; East Rutherford, New Jersey
Dec 19, 1987*		Maine	W 74–60	4–1	Rothman Center; Hackensack, New Jersey
Dec 22, 1987*		Saint Peter's	L 55–56	4–2	Rothman Center; Hackensack, New Jersey
Dec 30, 1987		at Loyola (MD)	W 72–65	5–2 (1–0)	Reitz Arena; Baltimore, Maryland
Jan 4, 1988*		at Miami (FL)	L 68–81	5–3	Knight Center; Coral Gables, Florida
Jan 7, 1988		at Monmouth	L 60–64	5–4 (1–1)	William T. Boylan Gymnasium; West Long Branch, New Jersey
Jan 9, 1988*		Rider	W 87–78	6–4	Rothman Center; Hackensack, New Jersey
Jan 12, 1988*		vs. Iona	W 76–75	7–4	Madison Square Garden; New York, New York
Jan 16, 1988		Marist	W 62–61	8–4 (2–1)	Rothman Center; Hackensack, New Jersey
Jan 19, 1988		at Long Island	W 99–78	9–4 (3–1)	Schwartz Athletic Center; Brooklyn, New York
Jan 21, 1988*		Concordia	W 93–79	10–4	Rothman Center; Hackensack, New Jersey
Jan 25, 1988		St. Francis (NY)	W 78–61	11–4 (4–1)	Rothman Center (1,000); Hackensack, New Jersey
Jan 28, 1988		at Robert Morris	W 82–76	12–4 (5–1)	Charles L. Sewall Center; Moon Township, Pennsylvania
Jan 30, 1988		at Saint Francis (PA)	W 92–72	13–4 (6–1)	Maurice Stokes Athletic Center; Loretto, Pennsylvania
Feb 3, 1988		Wagner	W 71–54	14–4 (7–1)	Rothman Center; Hackensack, New Jersey
Feb 6, 1988*		Caldwell	W 77–73	15–4	Rothman Center; Hackensack, New Jersey
Feb 10, 1988		Long Island	L 78–79	15–5 (7–2)	Rothman Center; Hackensack, New Jersey
Feb 13, 1988		at St. Francis (NY)	W 71–54	16–5 (8–2)	Generoso Pope Athletic Complex (750); Brooklyn, New York
Feb 16, 1988		Monmouth	W 68–52	17–5 (9–2)	Rothman Center; Hackensack, New Jersey
Feb 20, 1988		at Marist	W 78–75	18–5 (10–2)	McCann Arena; Poughkeepsie, New York
Feb 23, 1988		at Wagner	W 79–65	19–5 (11–2)	Sutter Gymnasium; Staten Island, New York
Feb 27, 1988		Loyola (MD)	W 89–67	20–5 (12–2)	Rothman Center; Hackensack, New Jersey
Mar 1, 1988		Saint Francis (PA)	W 68–58	21–5 (13–2)	Rothman Center; Hackensack, New Jersey
Mar 3, 1988		Robert Morris	L 71–76	21–6 (13–3)	Rothman Center; Hackensack, New Jersey
ECAC Metro tournament
Mar 8, 1988*		Long Island University; Semifinals	W 94–84	22–6	Rothman Center; Hackensack, New Jersey
Mar 9, 1988*		Monmouth; Championship game	W 90–75	23–6	Rothman Center (3,828); Hackensack, New Jersey
NCAA tournament
Mar 17, 1988*	(16 MW)	vs. (1 MW) No. 3 Purdue; First Round	L 79–94	23–7	Joyce Center; South Bend, Indiana
*Non-conference game. ^{#}Rankings from AP Poll. (#) Tournament seedings in parentheses. MW=Midwest Source. All times are in Eastern Time.
