= 1988 ECAC Metro men's basketball tournament =

- Classification: Division I
- Season: 1987–88
- Teams: 6
- Site: Campus sites
- Finals site: Rothman Center; Hackensack, NJ
- Champions: Fairleigh Dickinson (2nd title)
- Winning coach: Tom Green (2nd title)
- MVP: Jaime Latney (Fairleigh Dickinson)
- ECAC Metro men's basketball tournaments

1987–88 ECAC Metro men's basketball standings
	Conf.				Overall
Team	W		L	PCT	W		L	PCT
Fairleigh Dickinson†	13	–	3	.813	23	–	7	.767
Marist*	13	–	3	.813	18	–	9	.667
Monmouth	11	–	5	.688	16	–	13	.552
Robert Morris	9	–	7	.563	14	–	14	.500
Long Island	8	–	8	.500	14	–	14	.500
Loyola (MD)	6	–	10	.375	8	–	22	.267
St. Francis (NY)	5	–	11	.313	11	–	18	.379
Saint Francis (PA)	4	–	12	.250	7	–	20	.259
Wagner	3	–	13	.188	9	–	18	.333
† 1988 ECAC Metro tournament winner Rankings from AP Poll *Ineligible for conference tournament

The 1988 ECAC Metro men's basketball tournament (now known as the Northeast Conference men's basketball tournament) was held March 6–9. The quarterfinal and semifinal rounds were played on campus sites with the championship game held at Rothman Center in Hackensack, New Jersey.

Fairleigh Dickinson defeated Monmouth in the championship game, 90–75, to win the school's second ECAC Metro men's basketball tournament title. The Knights earned the automatic bid to the 1988 NCAA tournament.

== Bracket ==
Quarterfinals; Sunday, March 6
4	Long Island	99
5	Loyola (MD)	90
3	Robert Morris	82
6	St. Francis (NY)	91

Semifinals; Tuesday, March 8
1	Fairleigh Dickinson	94
4	Long Island	84
6	St. Francis (NY)	48
2	Monmouth	61

Championship; Wednesday, March 9
1	Fairleigh Dickinson	90
2	Monmouth	75
