= 2004–05 Fairleigh Dickinson Knights men's basketball team =

American college basketball season

2004–05 Fairleigh Dickinson Knights men's basketball
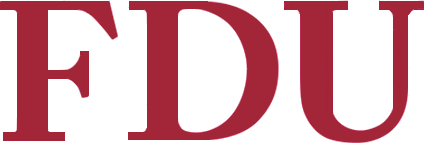

NEC tournament champions

NCAA tournament, First Round
- Conference: Northeast Conference
- Record: 20–11 (13–5 NEC)
- Head coach: Tom Green (22nd season)
- Home arena: Rothman Center

2004–05 Northeast Conference men's basketball standings
	Conf.				Overall
Team	W		L	PCT	W		L	PCT
Monmouth	14	–	4	.778	16	–	13	.552
Fairleigh Dickinson †	13	–	5	.722	20	–	13	.606
Robert Morris	11	–	7	.611	14	–	15	.483
Long Island	10	–	8	.556	14	–	15	.483
Saint Francis (PA)	10	–	8	.556	15	–	13	.536
Wagner	10	–	8	.556	13	–	17	.433
St. Francis (NY)	9	–	9	.500	13	–	15	.464
Central Connecticut	8	–	10	.444	12	–	16	.429
Quinnipiac	6	–	12	.333	10	–	17	.370
Mount St. Mary's	5	–	13	.278	7	–	20	.259
Sacred Heart	3	–	15	.167	4	–	23	.148
† 2005 NEC tournament winner

The 2004–05 Fairleigh Dickinson Knights men's basketball team represented Fairleigh Dickinson University during the 2004–05 NCAA Division I men's basketball season. The team was led by 22nd-year head coach Tom Green. The Knights played their home games at the Rothman Center in Hackensack, New Jersey as members of the Northeast Conference.

The Knights compiled a 20–13 record and went 13–5 in NEC play to finish second in the conference regular season standings. They defeated St. Francis, Long Island, and Wagner to capture the NEC tournament championship. The Knights received the conference's automatic bid to the NCAA tournament as No. 16 seed in the Midwest region. The Knights fell to No. 1 overall seed and eventual National runner-up Illinois, 67–55, in the opening round.

== Roster ==
2004–05 Fairleigh Dickinson Knights men's basketball team
Players
Coaches

Pos.	#	Name	Height	Weight	Year	Hometown
G	22	Tamien Trent	6 ft 0 in (1.83 m)	190 lb (86 kg)	Sr	Moriches, New York
F	50	Gordon Klaiber	6 ft 9 in (2.06 m)	205 lb (93 kg)	Jr	Greenbelt, Maryland

Head coach

- Tom Green

Assistant coach(es)

Legend

- (C) Team captain
- (S) Suspended
- (I) Ineligible
- (W) Walk-on
- Injured
- Current redshirt

Roster

== Schedule and results ==
Date time, TV	Rank^{#}	Opponent^{#}	Result	Record	Site (attendance) city, state
Regular season
Dec 4, 2004*		at California	L 66–80	2–4	Haas Pavilion; Berkeley, California
Dec 6, 2004*		at Arizona State	L 81–89	2–5	Wells Fargo Arena; Tempe, Arizona
NEC tournament
Mar 3, 2005*		St. Francis (NY); Quarterfinals	W 78–60	18–12	Rothman Center (1,013); Hackensack, New Jersey
Mar 6, 2005*		Long Island University; Semifinals	W 70–62	19–12	Rothman Center (1,860); Hackensack, New Jersey
Mar 9, 2005*		Wagner; Championship game	W 58–52	20–12	Rothman Center (3,127); Hackensack, New Jersey
NCAA tournament
Mar 17, 2005*	(16 CHI)	vs. (1 CHI) No. 1 Illinois; First round	L 55–67	20–13	RCA Dome; Indianapolis, Indiana
*Non-conference game. ^{#}Rankings from AP Poll. (#) Tournament seedings in parentheses. CHI=Chicago Source. All times are in Eastern Time.
