= Luis T. Centina Jr. =

- Born: August 21, 1921; Passi, Iloilo, Philippine Islands
- Died: July 18, 2015 (aged 93); Belleville, New Jersey, United States
- Education: West Negros University
- Occupations: Educator, writer
- Writing career
- Genres: Fiction, nonfiction
- Military career
- Allegiance: United States
- Branch: Regular Army
- Service years: 1941-1946
- Unit: USAFFE
- Website: www.gilbertluisrcentinaiii.com

Luis Torres Centina Jr. (August 21, 1921 – July 18, 2015) was a Filipino American author who served as a guerrilla leader in the United States Army Forces Far East (USAFFE) during the Second World War in the island of Negros in the Philippines. He wrote articles in Philippine publications about his personal recollections of the war, which formed the basis of a book, Almost on the Carpet, posthumously published in April 2016. “In recognition of [his] outstanding meritorious service in ground combat during World War II in the Asiatic-Pacific theater of operations," the New Jersey Department of Military and Veterans Affairs honored him with a certificate of appreciation on July 14, 2001.

== Early life ==
Born in Passi, Iloilo, in the Philippines, Luis was the son of Luis Centena Sr. and Antonia Torres, who also went by the name of Antonia Cordero. His father was a land surveyor while his mother was a landowning schoolteacher who financed his education and that of his siblings with income from her rice lands. He grew up in his hometown of Calinog, Iloilo. When his mother abruptly died while Luis was around ten years of age, the family fortune dramatically changed, forcing him to look for a job after graduation in 1939 from Iloilo High School, now known as Iloilo National High School, instead of pursuing his dream to become a structural engineer. When he came into his own, he started using a variant of his last name, spelling it with a "ti" instead of with a "te."

The social connections his father made as an itinerant land surveyor helped Luis find work in Capiz building public works in the province where he stayed for a year. His adventurous spirit soon brought him to Cadiz, Negros Occidental, where he was taken under the wings of a geodetic engineer as a journeyman. He surveyed and measured lands designated for road construction.

== Guerrilla Leader ==
On December 7, 1941, the Japanese Imperial Army launched a sneak attack on Pearl Harbor, which drew the United States into World War II. Since the Philippines was a U.S. colony at the time, the invasion of the Philippines by the Empire of Japan came within ten hours of the attack on Pearl Harbor. The Japanese invasion of the Philippines led to the Japanese occupation of the Southeast Asian archipelago between 1942 and 1945.

Luis answered the call to defend his country by enlisting in the Philippine Commonwealth Army, which months earlier had been placed under the USAFFE led by Gen. Douglas MacArthur, who was tasked by President Franklin D. Roosevelt to defend the Philippines when war with Japan looked imminent. But Luis failed his physical when an Army physician diagnosed him with an enlarged heart. However, in the face of an impending Japanese attack on the island of Negros, Camp Magallon where he went to enlist was on edge and Army recruiters were distracted, creating an opening for Luis to present the X-ray results of a friend as his own. He was admitted into the Philippine Commonwealth Army and inducted into the USAFFE on December 21, 1941.

Assigned to Camp Barrett in the village of La Granja in La Carlota City, then a municipality, he reported to Col. Roger B. Hilsman, commander of Negros island and of the 2nd Battalion, 101st Infantry of the Visayas-Mindanao Force. With the fall of Bataan and Corregidor, Maj. Gen. Jonathan M. Wainwright determined that further resistance was futile. He surrendered the Philippines to the Japanese on May 6, 1942. On May 21, 1942, Colonel Hilsman ordered the surrender of Negros island. Out of five battalions, Luis’ battalion was one of three which complied. The rest fled into the mountains to fight a guerrilla war.

But while Luis was on his way to a Japanese concentration camp in Fabrica, Sagay to the north of the province, the Army truck that was transporting him had a flat tire. He seized the opportunity to escape and sought refuge on the sugarcane farm of a friend, Eliodoro Ramos Jr., a private under his unit at Camp Barrett who refused to surrender. He later married his friend's sister, Eva, with whom he had eight children, one of whom was lost to miscarriage. His friend and brother-in-law Eliodoro was killed by a Japanese sniper during one of the fiercest battles in late 1944 leading to the liberation of the island the following year by American, Filipino and local guerrilla forces.

As a guerrilla leader, Luis was promoted to staff sergeant and led eighteen enlisted men and a number of Civilian Volunteer Guards in the intelligence unit of the 7th Military District of Negros island. They gathered intelligence on the enemy and dispatched their reports to Australia, where General MacArthur was headquartered. They also imposed discipline on erring guerrillas, some of whom formed “wild units” accused of abusing civilians. During the liberation of the Philippines in 1945, they pinpointed Japanese military targets to American pilots.

After the war in 1945, he stayed in the Army as an investigator of the Philippine War Crimes Commission that looked into atrocities committed during the war and sent war collaborators to face justice in Leyte.

== Educator ==
He briefly worked as assistant deputy provincial assessor of the province of Iloilo. Taking advantage of the Philippine version of the GI Bill, he went to college and obtained a teaching diploma after two years. With two young sons to feed, he saw the teaching profession as the surest way to earn a regular pay check. The Philippines badly needed schoolteachers to provide economic development through education in a country devastated by war and newly granted independence by the United States in 1946.

Except for the first two years of his thirty-four year career as an educator, he served as a grade schoolteacher in the Division of La Carlota City Schools under the Philippine Department of Education. He was later promoted as chief division statistician and attendance teacher. Fellow teachers elected him to the board of the Negros Occidental Teachers Federation, where he worked to enhance their benefits until 1983, a year past his retirement from government service.

== Almost on the Carpet ==
Almost on the Carpet is based on an article of the same title published in the Philippine Digest in 1971. An expanded version of the article appeared in the March 2003 edition of Search, an Augustinian cultural journal published in Manila. Before being diagnosed with Alzheimer's disease in 2008, Luis left copious notes in long hand about his war experiences, which were incorporated into his Search article and published as a book. The nonfiction work tells the story of a young man caught in the cataclysm of a global conflict, and how he found love and met his destiny against the backdrop of the Second World War. According to the blurb of the book, it chronicles his struggles after a "young man's dream is shattered by the advent of the Second World War. As the drums of war grow louder, he finds love within the vortex of horror and deprivation unleashed upon the Philippine archipelago by the invading Japanese Imperial Army. A personal recollection of the Second World War by a guerrilla leader fighting under the U.S flag."

As a writer, Luis' short fiction "The Tragic Ballad of Maestro Bondoc" was published in Homelife, a Catholic family magazine in the Philippines, in 1976. He is the father of author and poet Gilbert Luis R. Centina III.

Under the Immigration Act of 1990, which was signed into law by President George H. W. Bush, Luis and his wife became U.S. citizens in 1992, forty-seven years after the war. A provision authored by Senator Daniel K. Inouye was incorporated into the bill which enabled qualified Filipino veterans to avail themselves of American citizenship. Before finding success in the 1990 immigration law, Inouye, a World War II hero, had championed over many years the cause of World War II Filipino veterans who fought under the U.S. flag.

Luis died on July 18, 2015, due to complications from both Alzheimer's disease and diabetes at home in Belleville, New Jersey.
