= 1984–85 St. Francis Terriers men's basketball team =

American college basketball season

1984–85 St. Francis Terriers men's basketball
- Conference: ECAC Metro
- Record: 7–21 (3–11 NEC)
- Head coach: Bob Valvano (1st season)
- Home arena: Generoso Pope Athletic Complex

1984–85 ECAC Metro men's basketball standings
	Conf.				Overall
Team	W		L	PCT	W		L	PCT
Marist	11	–	3	.786	17	–	12	.586
Fairleigh Dickinson †	10	–	4	.714	21	–	10	.677
Long Island	9	–	5	.643	15	–	13	.536
Loyola (MD)	8	–	6	.571	16	–	14	.533
Saint Francis (PA)	6	–	8	.429	9	–	19	.321
Wagner	5	–	9	.357	11	–	17	.393
Robert Morris	4	–	10	.286	9	–	19	.321
St. Francis (NY)	3	–	11	.214	7	–	21	.250
† 1985 ECAC Metro tournament winner Rankings from AP Poll

The 1984–85 St. Francis Terriers men's basketball team represented St. Francis College during the 1984–85 NCAA Division I men's basketball season. The team was coached by Bob Valvano, who was in his first year at the helm of the St. Francis Terriers. The Terrier's home games were played at the Generoso Pope Athletic Complex. The team has been a member of the Northeast Conference since 1981, although at this time the conference was known as the ECAC Metro Conference.

The Terriers finished their season at 7–21 overall and 3–11 in conference play. They played in the conference tournament with the 8th seed, but lost in the opening round to Marist.

Bob Valvano, at the time of his hiring, was the youngest coach in NCAA Division I men's basketball. He is the brother of Jim Valvano, who led NC State to an NCAA Tournament championship in 1983. Valvano was given a one-year $26,000 contract by St. Francis.

Magdi Ahamed, a freshman, was a member of the Sudan national basketball team.

== Roster ==
1984–85 St. Francis Brooklyn Terriers men's basketball team
Players
Coaches

Pos.	#	Name	Height	Weight	Year	Hometown
F		Chris Phillips	6 ft 4 in (1.93 m)	—	Sr
G		Jim Paguaga	6 ft 0 in (1.83 m)	—	Jr
F		Theo Graham	6 ft 6 in (1.98 m)	—	Jr
G		Brian LaGrua	6 ft 1 in (1.85 m)	—	Jr
G		Jerome Washington	5 ft 10 in (1.78 m)	—	Jr
G		Terry Lacewell	6 ft 2 in (1.88 m)	—	Jr
F		Dickens Benoit	6 ft 3 in (1.91 m)	—	So
F		Blaine Drayton	6 ft 5 in (1.96 m)	—	So
G		Tim Brisco	6 ft 1 in (1.85 m)	—	So
C		Magdi Ahamed	6 ft 9 in (2.06 m)	—	Fr

Head coach

- Bob Valvano (Virginia Wesleyan '79)

Assistant coach(es)

Legend

- (C) Team captain
- (S) Suspended
- (I) Ineligible
- (W) Walk-on
- Injured
- Current redshirt

== Schedule and results ==
Date time, TV	Opponent	Result	Record	Site (attendance) city, state
Regular season
November __, 1984*	William Patterson	W 69–65	1–0	Generoso Pope Athletic Complex (613); Brooklyn, NY
November 30, 1984*	vs. St. Bonaventure; Joe Lapchick Memorial tournament	L 59–73	1–1	Alumni Hall (6,000); Jamaica, NY
December 1, 1984*	vs. Lafayette; Joe Lapchick Memorial tournament	L 42–67	1–2	Alumni Hall (6,000); Jamaica, NY
December 3, 1984*	Fordham	L 65–82	1–3	Generoso Pope Athletic Complex (6,000); Brooklyn, NY
December 7, 1984	at Long Island; Battle of Brooklyn	L 63–68	1–4 (0–1)	Schwartz Athletic Center (1,253); Brooklyn, NY
December 9, 1984*	vs. Monmouth	L 51–53	1–5	Bryne Arena (9,753); East Rutherford, NJ
December 12, 1984*	at Iona	L 60–72	1–6	Hynes Athletic Center (1,347); New Rochelle, NY
December 15, 1984*	at Rider	L 66–71 ^{OT}	1–7	Alumni Gymnasium (268); Lawrenceville, NJ
December 22, 1984*	Manhattan	L 64–69	1–8	Generoso Pope Athletic Complex (817); Brooklyn, NY
January 3, 1985	at Marist	L 46–63	1–9 (0–2)	McCann Arena (1,316); Poughkeepsie, NY
January __, 1985*	Southampton	W 69–65	2–9	Generoso Pope Athletic Complex (499); Brooklyn, NY
January 9, 1985*	Siena	L 60–67	2–10	Generoso Pope Athletic Complex (769); Brooklyn, NY
January 11, 1985	Loyola (MD)	L 42–61	2–11 (0–3)	Generoso Pope Athletic Complex (271); Brooklyn, NY
January 14, 1985*	at Maine	L 65–85	2–12	Memorial Gymnasium (2,000); Orono, ME
January 17, 1985	at Saint Francis (PA)	L 60–81	2–13 (0–4)	Maurice Stokes Athletic Center (1,500); Loretto, PA
January 19, 1985	at Robert Morris	L 60–61	2–14 (0–5)	John Jay Center (1,009); Moon Township, PA
January 23, 1985	Fairleigh Dickinson	W 62–49	3–14 (1–5)	Generoso Pope Athletic Complex (387); Brooklyn, NY
January 26, 1985	Wagner	W 57–56	4–14 (2–5)	Generoso Pope Athletic Complex (533); Brooklyn, NY
January 1985*	Pace	W 64–63	5–14	Generoso Pope Athletic Complex (904); Brooklyn, NY
February 2, 1985	Long Island	L 73–74	5–15 (2–6)	Generoso Pope Athletic Complex (1,207); Brooklyn, NY
February __, 1985*	CCNY	W 73–55	6–15	Generoso Pope Athletic Complex (464); Brooklyn, NY
February 9, 1985	at Fairleigh Dickinson	L 48–69	6–16 (2–7)	(302); Rutherford, NJ
February 11, 1985	at Wagner	L 65–73	6–17 (2–8)	Sutter Gymnasium (700); Staten Island, NY
February 14, 1985	at Loyola (MD)	L 50–75	6–18 (2–9)	Reitz Arena (610); Baltimore, MD
February 16, 1985	Marist	L 42–48	6–19 (2–10)	Generoso Pope Athletic Complex (716); Brooklyn, NY
February 22, 1985	Saint Francis (PA)	L 59–61	6–20 (2–11)	Generoso Pope Athletic Complex (369); Brooklyn, NY
February 23, 1985	Robert Morris	W 55–51	7–20 (3–11)	Generoso Pope Athletic Complex (1,269); Brooklyn, NY
ECAC Metro tournament
March 2, 1985	vs. Marist; Quarterfinal	L 44–52	7–21	Reitz Arena (421); Baltimore, MD
*Non-conference game. ^{#}Rankings from AP Poll. (#) Tournament seedings in parentheses. All times are in Eastern Time.
