= 1985 ECAC Metro men's basketball tournament =

- Classification: Division I
- Season: 1984–85
- Teams: 8
- Site: Reitz Arena; Baltimore, MD
- Champions: Fairleigh Dickinson (1st title)
- Winning coach: Tom Green (1st title)
- MVP: Larry Hampton (Fairleigh Dickinson)
- ECAC Metro men's basketball tournaments

1984–85 ECAC Metro men's basketball standings
	Conf.				Overall
Team	W		L	PCT	W		L	PCT
Marist	11	–	3	.786	17	–	12	.586
Fairleigh Dickinson †	10	–	4	.714	21	–	10	.677
Long Island	9	–	5	.643	15	–	13	.536
Loyola (MD)	8	–	6	.571	16	–	14	.533
Saint Francis (PA)	6	–	8	.429	9	–	19	.321
Wagner	5	–	9	.357	11	–	17	.393
Robert Morris	4	–	10	.286	9	–	19	.321
St. Francis (NY)	3	–	11	.214	7	–	21	.250
† 1985 ECAC Metro tournament winner Rankings from AP Poll

The 1985 ECAC Metro men's basketball tournament (now known as the Northeast Conference men's basketball tournament) was held March 2–4. All three rounds of the tournament were played at Reitz Arena in Baltimore, Maryland.

Fairleigh Dickinson defeated Loyola (MD) in the championship game, 63–59, to win the school's first ECAC Metro men's basketball tournament title. The Knights earned the automatic bid to the 1985 NCAA Tournament.

== Bracket ==
Quarterfinals; Sunday, March 2
1	Marist	52
8	St. Francis (NY)	44
4	Loyola (MD)	84
5	St. Francis (PA)	71
3	Long Island	89
6	Wagner	68
2	Fairleigh Dickinson	65
7	Robert Morris	49

Semifinals; Tuesday, March 3
1	Marist	55
4	Loyola (MD)	56^{2OT}
3	Long Island	71
2	Fairleigh Dickinson	73

Championship; Wednesday, March 4
4	Loyola (MD)	59
2	Fairleigh Dickinson	63
