= Adelina Gurrea =

Philippine journalist, poet and playwright

- Born: María Adelaida Gurrea Monasterio; September 27, 1896; La Carlota, Negros Occidental, Captaincy General of the Philippines
- Died: April 29, 1971 (aged 74); Madrid, Spain
- Citizenship: Philippines, Spain
- Education: Santa Scholastica de Manila
- Occupations: writer, journalist, poet, playwright, historian, linguist
- Writing career
- Language: Spanish

María Adelaida Gurrea Monasterio (September 27, 1896, in La Carlota, Negros Occidental, Philippines – April 29, 1971, in Madrid) was a Philippine journalist, poet and playwright in Spanish.

She studied in a religious school in Manila (St. Scholastica's College), where she received her high school and Bachelor of Arts diplomas.

She went to Madrid in 1921, where she worked as foreign correspondent in several publications in Spanish language, such as La Vanguardia, El Mercantil or Excelsior.

She was Filipino Literature Ambassador in Spain, where she took part in several associations for the popularisation and support of her culture. She founded the Círculo Hispano-Filipino de Madrid (Spanish-Philippine Society of Madrid) in 1950.

== Awards ==
- Premio Zóbel Award, 1955 for A lo largo del camino.

== Works ==
- Cuentos de Juana. Malay tales from Philippine Islands. Madrid: Prensa Española, 1943.
- A lo largo del camino. Poetry. Madrid: Círculo Filipino, 1954. Introduction by Federico Muelas. Drawings by Beatriz Figueirido.
- Más senderos. Poetry. Madrid: the author, 1967
- En agraz. Poetry. Madrid: the author, 1968

== References and external links ==
- Beatriz Álvarez Tardío; Dra. Mercedes Arriaga Flores.. «Escritoras y pensadoras». I + D del Ministerio de Educación y Ciencias.
- Brillantes, Lourdes. 81 Years of Premio Zobel: A Legacy of Philippine Literature in Spanish. Filipinas Heritage Library, 2006.
- Article about Adelina. Andrea Gallo, University of Seville (spanish)
