= 1987–88 St. Francis Terriers men's basketball team =

American college basketball season

1987–88 St. Francis Terriers men's basketball
- Conference: ECAC Metro
- Record: 11–18 (5–11 NEC)
- Head coach: Bob Valvano (4th season)
- Home arena: Generoso Pope Athletic Complex

1987–88 ECAC Metro men's basketball standings
	Conf.				Overall
Team	W		L	PCT	W		L	PCT
Fairleigh Dickinson†	13	–	3	.813	23	–	7	.767
Marist*	13	–	3	.813	18	–	9	.667
Monmouth	11	–	5	.688	16	–	13	.552
Robert Morris	9	–	7	.563	14	–	14	.500
Long Island	8	–	8	.500	14	–	14	.500
Loyola (MD)	6	–	10	.375	8	–	22	.267
St. Francis (NY)	5	–	11	.313	11	–	18	.379
Saint Francis (PA)	4	–	12	.250	7	–	20	.259
Wagner	3	–	13	.188	9	–	18	.333
† 1988 ECAC Metro tournament winner Rankings from AP Poll *Ineligible for conference tournament

The 1987–88 St. Francis Terriers men's basketball team represented St. Francis College during the 1987–88 NCAA Division I men's basketball season. The team was coached by Bob Valvano, who was in his fourth year at the helm of the St. Francis Terriers. The Terrier's home games were played at the Generoso Pope Athletic Complex. The team has been a member of the Northeast Conference since 1981, although at this time the conference was known as the ECAC Metro Conference.

The Terriers finished their season at 11–18 overall and 5–11 in conference play. They qualified for the NEC Tournament with the 6th seed and beat Robert Morris in the opening round before losing to Monmouth in the semifinals.

== Roster ==
1987–88 St. Francis Brooklyn Terriers men's basketball team
Players
Coaches

Pos.	#	Name	Height	Weight	Year	Hometown
F		Darwin Purdie	6 ft 6 in (1.98 m)	—	Jr	Wilmington, Delaware
G		Rodney Henry	6 ft 0 in (1.83 m)	—	Jr
G		Juan Jorge	6 ft 4 in (1.93 m)	—	Jr
G		Chris Palermo	6 ft 2 in (1.88 m)	—	Jr
G		John Flannigan	5 ft 11 in (1.8 m)	—	So
		Andre Kibbler	6 ft 7 in (2.01 m)	—	So
C		Stefan Jensen	6 ft 9 in (2.06 m)	—	So
G		Kevin Israel	5 ft 8 in (1.73 m)	—	Fr
G		John Szymczyk	6 ft 2 in (1.88 m)	—	Fr
		Fred Cooper	6 ft 7 in (2.01 m)	—	Fr

Head coach

- Bob Valvano (Virginia Wesleyan '79)

Assistant coach(es)

Legend

- (C) Team captain
- (S) Suspended
- (I) Ineligible
- (W) Walk-on
- Injured
- Current redshirt

== Schedule and results ==
Date time, TV	Rank^{#}	Opponent^{#}	Result	Record	Site (attendance) city, state
Regular season
November 28, 1987*		St. Joseph's	W 107–55	1–0	Generoso Pope Athletic Complex (1,128); Brooklyn, NY
December 3, 1987*		at Manhattan	L 73–85	1–1	Draddy Gymnasium (1,500); Bronx, NY
December 5, 1987*		Rider	W 118–115 ^{2OT}	2–1	Generoso Pope Athletic Complex (550); Brooklyn, NY
December __, 1987*		Southampton	W 75–58	3–1	Generoso Pope Athletic Complex (507); Brooklyn, NY
December 9, 1987*		at Morgan State	L 59–61 ^{OT}	3–2	Talmadge L. Hill Field House (1,350); Baltimore, MD
December 12, 1987		at Long Island; Battle of Brooklyn	L 63–66	3–3 (0–1)	Schwartz Athletic Center (500); Brooklyn, NY
December __, 1987*		Staten Island	W 68–66	4–3	Generoso Pope Athletic Complex (1,021); Brooklyn, NY
January 6, 1988		at Marist	L 48–52	4–4 (0–2)	McCann Arena (2,598); Poughkeepsie, NY
January 11, 1988*		Hofstra	W 66–58	5–4	Generoso Pope Athletic Complex (750); Brooklyn, NY
January 14, 1988		at Loyola (MD)	L 57–78	5–5 (0–3)	Reitz Arena (400); Baltimore, MD
January 16, 1988*		at Central Florida	L 79–80	5–6	UCF Gymnasium (444); Orlando, FL
January 18, 1988*		at Florida International	L 86–97	5–7	U.S. Century Bank Arena (602); Miami, FL
January 21, 1988		Saint Francis (PA)	W 61–58	6–7 (1–3)	Generoso Pope Athletic Complex (750); Brooklyn, NY
January 23, 1988		Robert Morris	W 66–53	7–7 (2–3)	Generoso Pope Athletic Complex (575); Brooklyn, NY
January 25, 1988		at Fairleigh Dickinson	L 61–78	7–8 (2–4)	(1,000); Rutherford, NJ
January 27, 1988		at Monmouth	W 67–65	8–8 (3–4)	William T. Boylan Gymnasium (1,129); West Long Branch, NJ
January 30, 1988		at Wagner	W 70–69	9–8 (4–4)	Sutter Gymnasium (1,003); Staten Island, NY
February __, 1988*		Pace	L 65–68	9–9	Generoso Pope Athletic Complex (850); Brooklyn, NY
February 6, 1988		Long Island	L 62–71	9–10 (4–5)	Generoso Pope Athletic Complex (1,050); Brooklyn, NY
February 8, 1988*		at Central Connecticut	L 61–68	9–11	Generoso Pope Athletic Complex (702); Brooklyn, NY
February 10, 1988		Marist	L 43–59	9–12 (4–6)	Generoso Pope Athletic Complex (1,800); Brooklyn, NY
February 13, 1988		Fairleigh Dickinson	L 54–71	9–13 (4–7)	Generoso Pope Athletic Complex (750); Brooklyn, NY
February 18, 1988		Loyola (MD)	L 62–66	9–14 (4–8)	Generoso Pope Athletic Complex (550); Brooklyn, NY
February 25, 1988		at Saint Francis (PA)	L 60–67	9–15 (4–9)	Maurice Stokes Athletic Center (551); Loretto, PA
February 27, 1988		at Robert Morris	L 58–91	9–16 (4–10)	Charles L. Sewall Center (750); Moon Township, PA
March 1, 1988		Monmouth	L 53–73	9–17 (4–11)	Generoso Pope Athletic Complex (450); Brooklyn, NY
March 3, 1988		Wagner	W 66–64	10–17 (5–11)	Generoso Pope Athletic Complex (550); Brooklyn, NY
ECAC Metro tournament
March 6, 1988	(7)	at (4) Robert Morris; Quarterfinal	W 59–56	11–17	Charles L. Sewall Center (603); Moon Township, PA
March 8, 1988	(7)	vs. (2) Monmouth; Semifinal	L 48–61	11–18	(3,172); Rutherford, NJ
*Non-conference game. ^{#}Rankings from AP Poll. (#) Tournament seedings in parentheses. All times are in Eastern Time.

== NEC awards ==
- Andre Kibbler, Rookie of the Year
