= STI West Negros University =

Private university in Bacolod, Philippines

- Pamantasang STI ng Kanlurang Negros (Filipino)
- Former names: West Negros College (1948–2008); West Negros University (2008–2014)
- Motto: "Veritas et Virtus" (Latin) (formerly as West Negros University)
- Motto in English: Education For Real Life; Be future-ready. Be STI. Truth and Virtue (formerly as West Negros University)
- Type: Private, nonsectarian, research, for profit, co-educational basic and higher education institution
- Established: February 14, 1948; 78 years ago
- Founders: Luciana Aritao; Teresa Padilla; Rosario Remitio
- Parent institution: STI Education Systems Holdings, Inc. (2013–present)
- Religious affiliation: Baptist Protestant (formerly as West Negros University)
- Academic affiliations: PACUCOA
- Chairman: Monico V. Jacob (also Chief Executive Officer)
- President: Ryan Mark S. Molina (also Chief Operations Officer)
- Executive Vice President: Vacant
- Students: 10,000 (as of 2022)
- Location: Burgos St., Bacolod, Negros Occidental, Philippines; 10°40′11″N 122°57′26″E
- Campus: 1 urban; 4 hectares (40,000 m^{2})
- Alma Mater song: STI Hymn
- Demonym: STIers, STI Wesnecans
- Colors: Yellow - Blue - White
- Nickname: STI WNU Mustangs
- Sporting affiliations: NOPSSCEA
- Mascots: Globe, Mustang
- Website: www.stiwnu.com westnegros.sti.edu
- Location in the Visayas Location in the Philippines

STI West Negros University, also referred to by its acronym STI WNU or colloquially as West Neg, is a private university located in Bacolod, Negros Occidental, Philippines established in 1948.

The university is accredited by the Philippine Association of Colleges and Universities - Commission On Accreditation (PACUCOA) as a level II school and awards degrees in associate, bachelor, master, and doctorate levels through its Colleges and School of Graduate Studies. It also offers complete basic education (pre-school, elementary & junior high school) through its School of Basic Education, formerly Integrated School (IS). Senior high school is being offered in the institution as well.

STI West Negros University has an enrollment of about 10,000 students per semester and produces 1,500 graduates every school year.

The acronym STI is an orphan initialism.

== History ==
West Negros University seal from 2008–2014

Old school seal as West Negros College

West Negros College (WNC) was founded in 1948 by three Baptist women leaders - Luciana Aritao, Teresa Padilla and Rosario Remitio after the Second World War. They believed that the school would fulfill their dream of Filipinos embracing Christian ideals and tenets. Leodegario Natividad Agustin became the school President in the 1970s; he provided the impetus, despite financial odds, to make West Negros College a successful academic community.

On February 11, 2008, the Commission on Higher Education found West Negros College to be in full compliance of their requirements and granted West Negros College status as a university (WNU).

In April 2013, STI Education Systems Holdings, Inc. announced in a disclosure that they had signed a memorandum of agreement with West Negros University for the acquisition of a controlling interest in the school. The acquisition was done on October 31, 2013.

In 2014, the institution significantly changed its name to STI West Negros University and in 2015, the remaining sole Bacolod campus of STI College in nearby Lacson Street (initially established in 2013) and the West Negros University - Integrated School in Eroreco Subdivision transferred and merged all of its operations to the newly renovated campus in Burgos Street. The school could also be accessed through its backgate at LN Agustin Drive.

== Academics ==
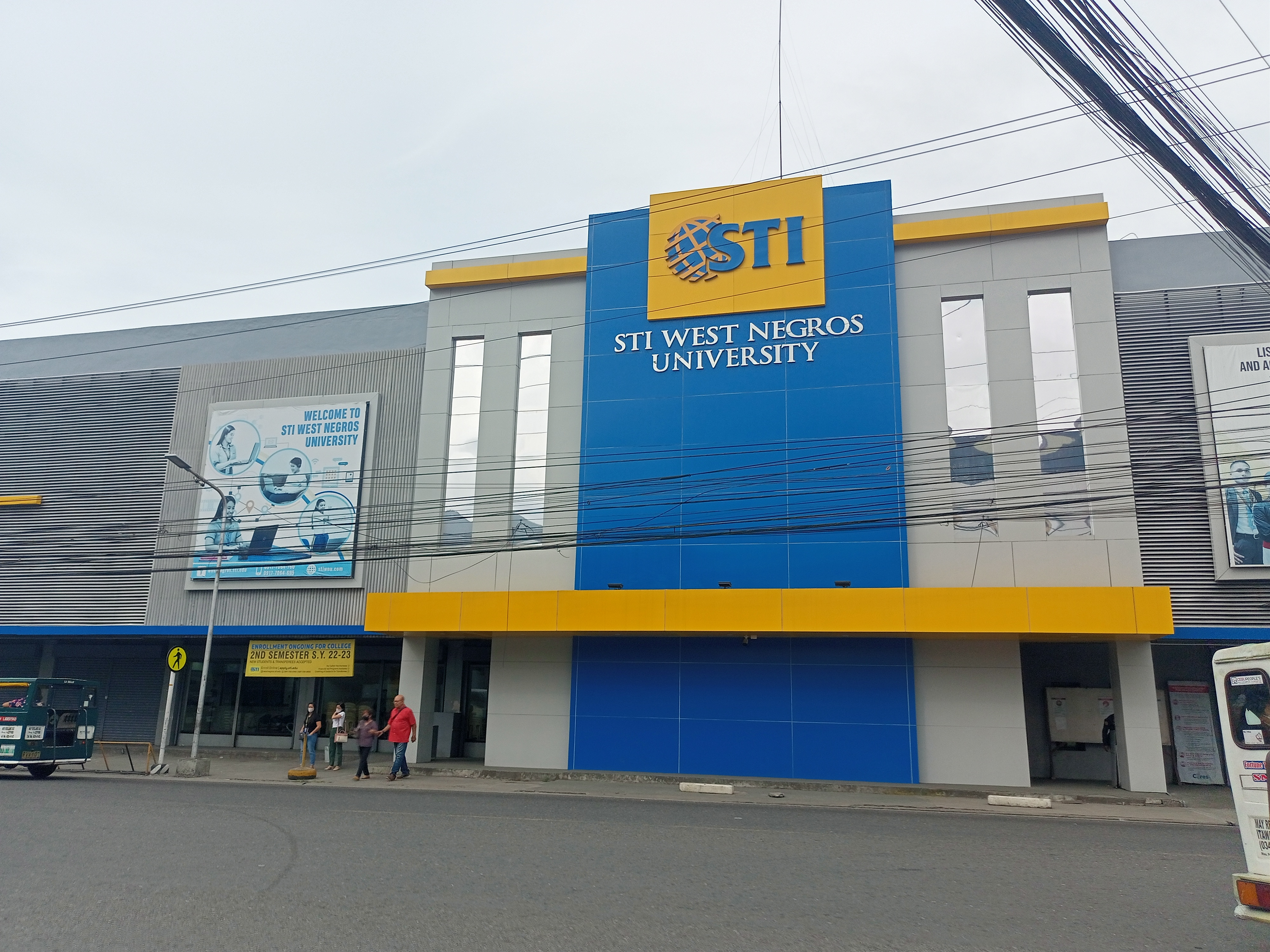
Facade of STI West Negros University along Burgos St.

As of 2021 to present, aside from the School of Basic Education, Senior High School, and School of Graduate Studies, STI WNU has six Colleges namely, College of Education, Arts and Sciences (CEAS), College of Criminal Justice Education (CCJE), College of Information and Communication Technology (CICT), College of Business Management and Accountancy (CBMA), College of Hospitality and Tourism Management (CHTM), and College of Engineering (COE).

== Events ==
The school's gymnasium served as the venue for the indoor volleyball games of the 2005 Southeast Asian Games.

== Notable alumni ==
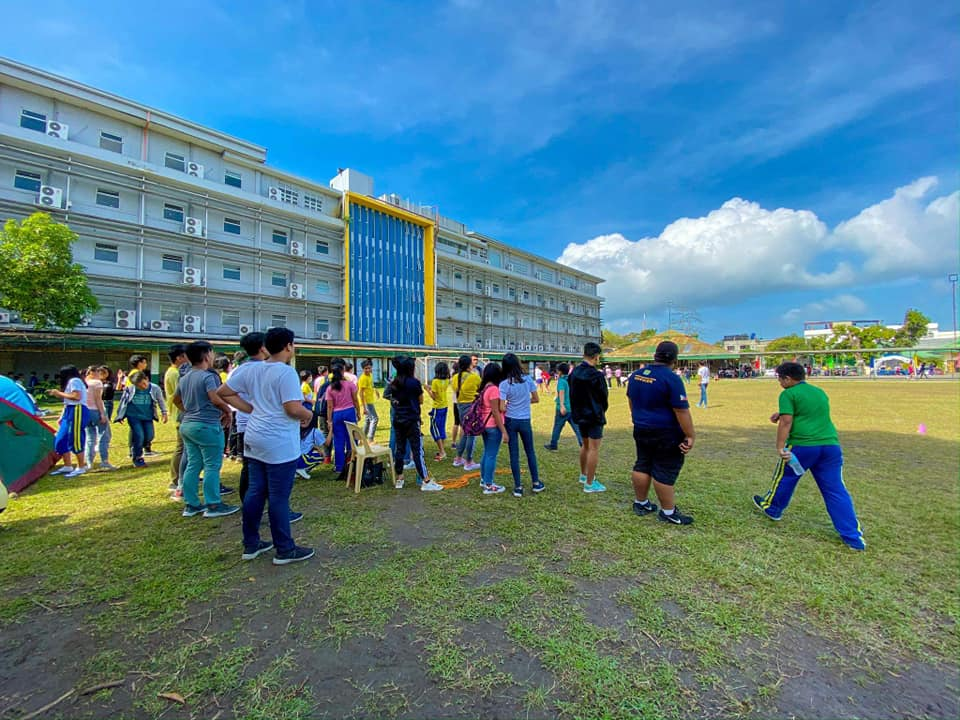
STI West Negros University campus

- Frank Chavez
- Dingdong Dantes
- Nonoy Baclao
- Peter Solis Nery
- Jovin Bedic
- Camelo Tacusalme
- Luis T. Centina Jr.
- Gilbert Teodoro
