= La Carlota, Negros Occidental =

Component city in Negros Occidental, Philippines

La Carlota
- Component city
- City of La Carlota
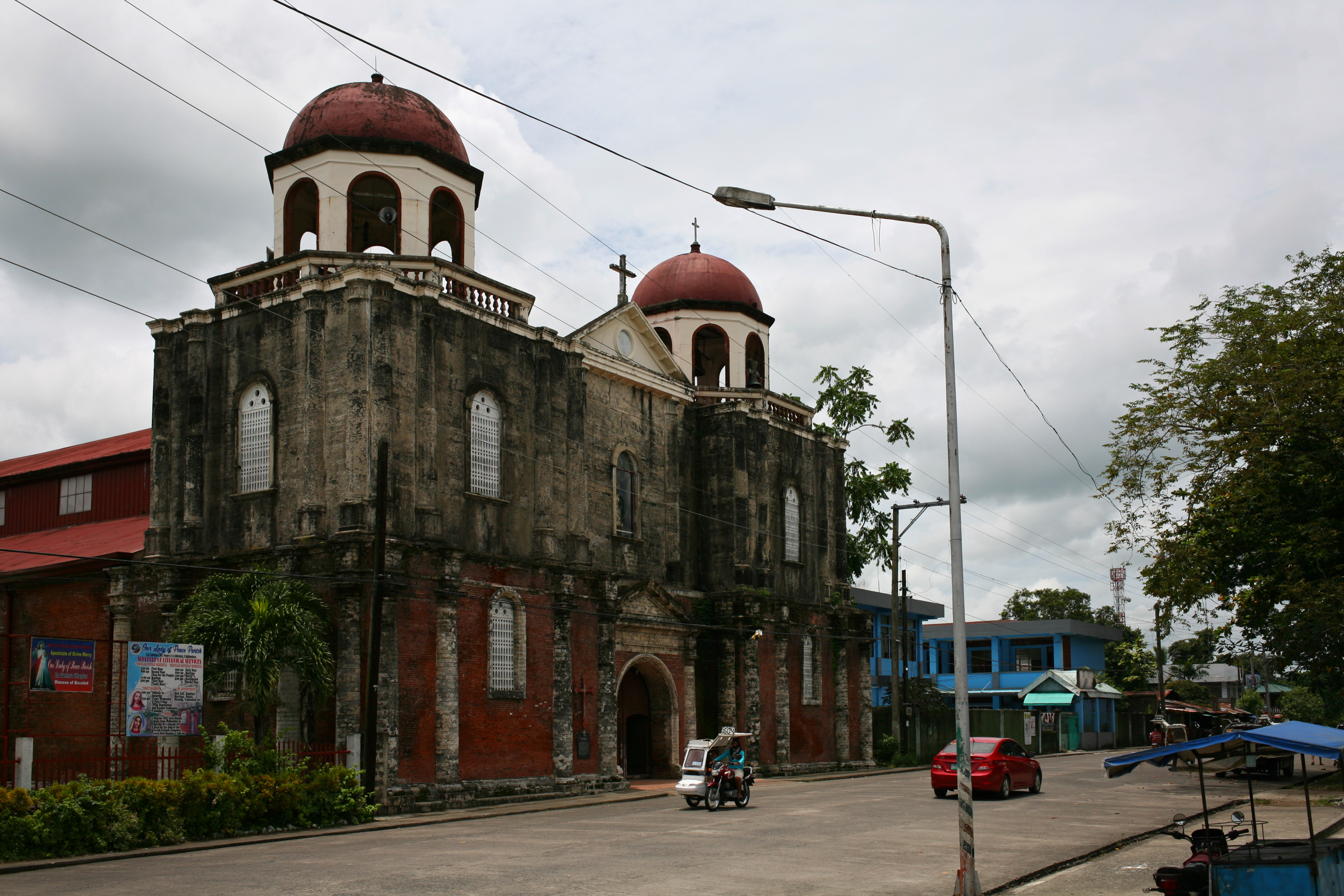
- Our Lady of Peace and Good Voyage Roman Catholic Church

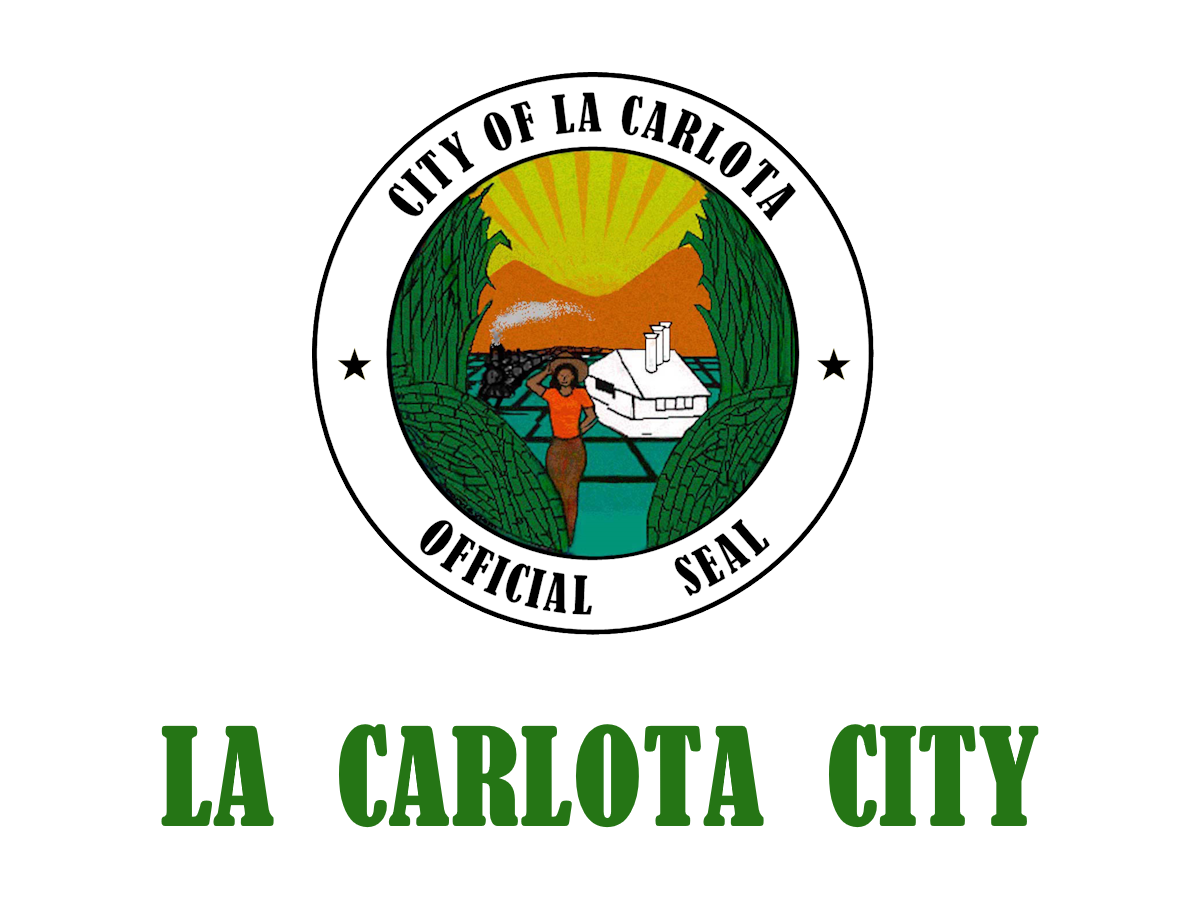
- Flag Seal
- Nickname: Drumbeating City of Beauty and Dance
- Motto: Let's Go La Carlota!
- Anthem: Let's Go La Carlota!
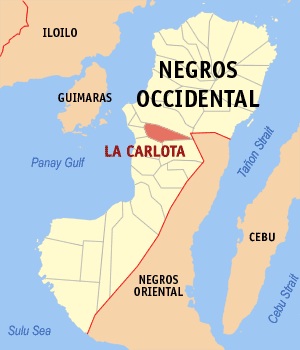
- Map of Negros Occidental with La Carlota highlighted
- Interactive map of La Carlota
- Location within the Philippines
- Coordinates: 10°25′N 122°55′E
- Country: Philippines
- Region: Negros Island Region
- Province: Negros Occidental
- District: 4th district
- Founded: October 15, 1869
- Cityhood: June 19, 1965
- Barangays: 14 (see Barangays)

Government
  - Type: Sangguniang Panlungsod
  - Mayor: Jose Luis D. Jalandoni (Ind)
  - Vice Mayor: David T. Baga, Jr. (UNegA)
  - Representative: Jeffrey P. Ferrer (NUP)
  - City Council: Members: Julius Martin D. Asistio; Amalia D. Aguirre; Ciriaco D. Sia, Jr.; Joseph Martin D. Jalandoni; Chrisjohn S. Polo; January A. Abad; Mark Threx M. Rojo; Jaime Manuel H. Mariño; Danilo R. Badillo; Stephen G. Simbit; Jelarie Jean M. Liansing ^{◌}; ◌ ex officio SK chairman
  - Electorate: 45,451 voters (2025)

Area
  - Total: 137.29 km^{2} (53.01 sq mi)
- Elevation: 77 m (253 ft)
- Highest elevation: 1,641 m (5,384 ft)
- Lowest elevation: 0 m (0 ft)

Population (2024 census)
  - Total: 67,740
  - Density: 493.4/km^{2} (1,278/sq mi)
  - Households: 16,508
- Demonym(s): La Carloteño; Mangkasanon

Economy
  - Income class: 4th city income class
  - Poverty incidence: 18.34% (2023)
  - Revenue: ₱ 842.1 million (2024)
  - Assets: ₱ 3,571 million (2024)
  - Expenditure: ₱ 879.6 million (2024)
  - Liabilities: ₱ 638.5 million (2024)

Service provider
  - Electricity: Negros Occidental Electric Cooperative (NOCECO)
- Time zone: UTC+8 (PST)
- ZIP code: 6130
- PSGC: 1804516000
- IDD : area code: +63 (0)34
- Native languages: Hiligaynon; Tagalog
- Website: lacarlotacity.gov.ph

La Carlota, officially the City of La Carlota, (Hiligaynon: Dakbanwa sang La Carlota; Cebuano: Dakbayan sa La Carlota; Filipino: Lungsod ng La Carlota), is a component city in the province of Negros Occidental, Philippines. According to the 2024 census, it has a population of 67,740 people, making it the least populous city in the province.

== History ==
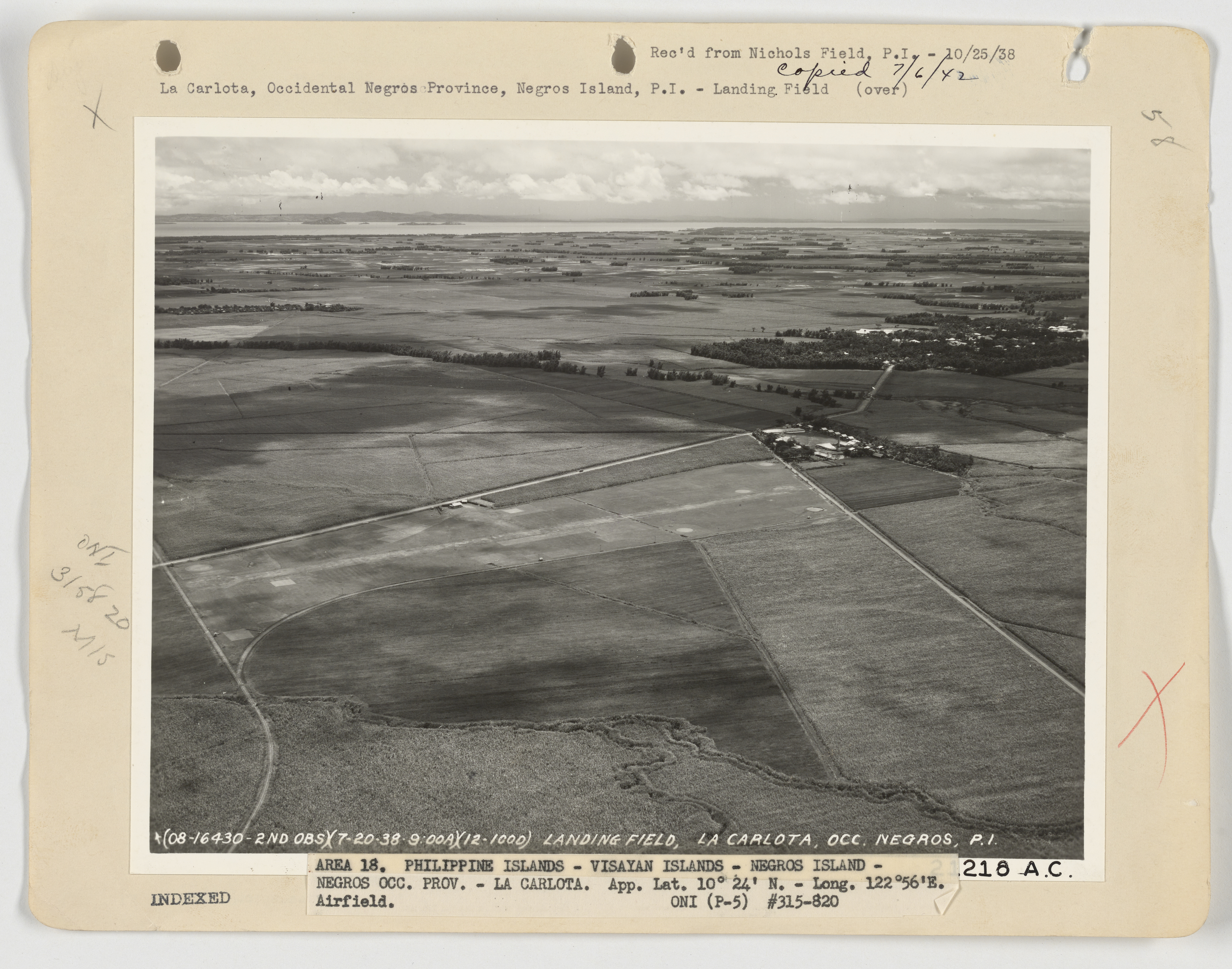
Aerial view of La Carlota and landing field, 1938

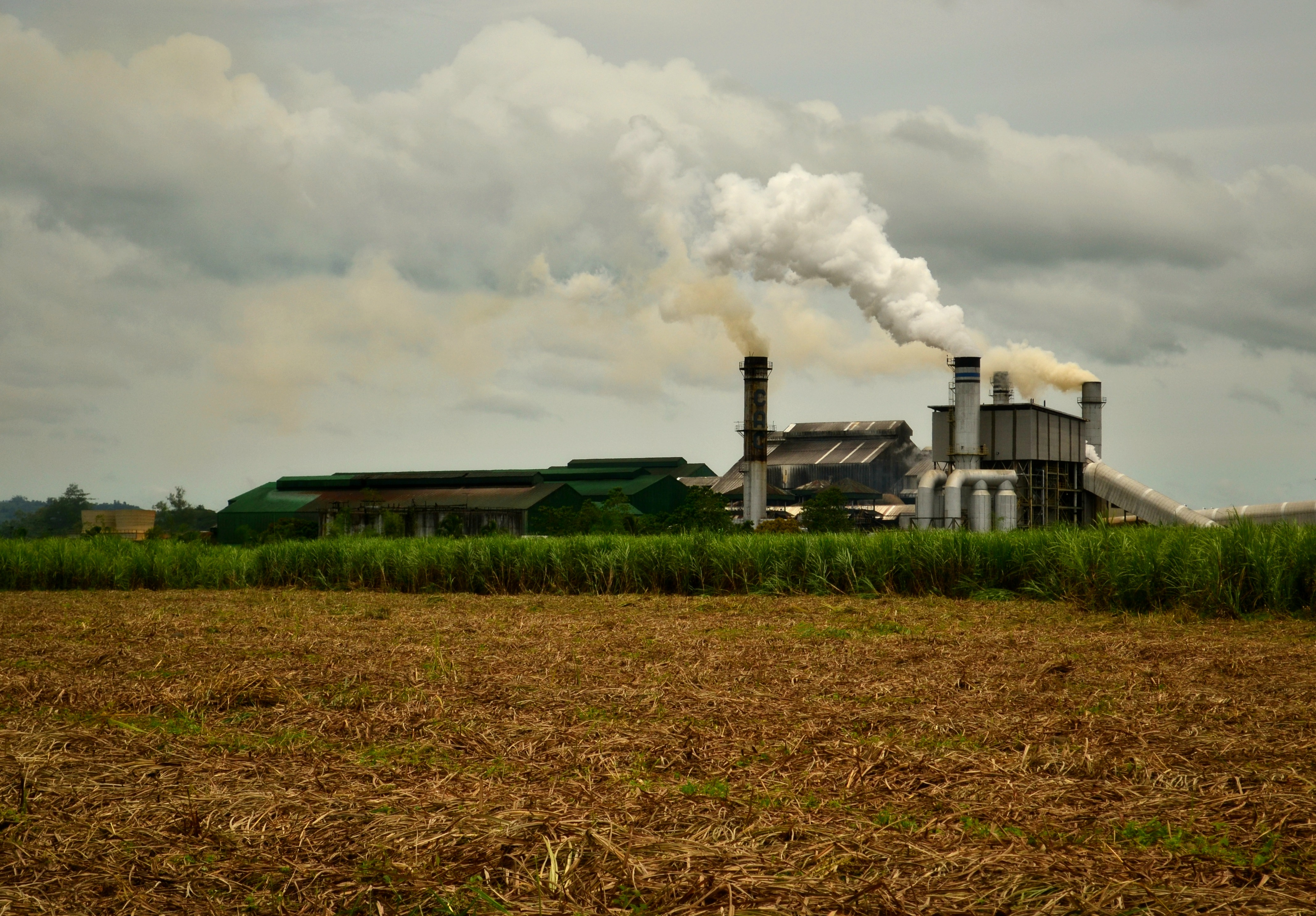
Central Azucarera de La Carlota

Throughout much of its early history, agriculture was the primary livelihood of the native settlers of Simancas. Early inhabitants cultivated rice for subsistence, while later settlers grew tobacco for export during the Spanish colonial period. Settlement activity centered along the Candaguit River, from which Simancas gradually expanded. By 1856, historical accounts began to mention Mampunay, and the parish priest of San Enrique subsequently designated Simancas as a barrio.

Before the establishment of permanent Spanish settlements in the Philippines in 1565, Simancas was said to have been led by Mangkas, a Negrito warrior who resided near what is now known as Canman-ug Creek. He was regarded for his role in defending the community and maintaining peace. According to local tradition, the settlement’s name was derived from the prevalence of individuals named after him, eventually becoming “Simancas.”

Spanish administration over the Philippine archipelago began to take shape in the late 16th century, marking the gradual integration of communities such as Simancas into the colonial system.

Until two years after its foundation in 1871, it was known as Simancas, a barrio under the jurisdiction of the neighboring town of San Enrique, which was led by a Spaniard who was married to a woman named Carlota. Legend has it that she was well-loved by the natives for her social works so that they named their settlement after her when it was created as a municipality near the end of the Spanish colonial era in the Philippines. In line with the Spanish practice of adding an article before a proper noun, “La Carlota” became its official name.

The division of Negros island into two distinct provinces (Negros Occidental and Negros Oriental) took place in 1890 at the start of this historic decade. La Carlota as well saw a flowering of culture during this decade, which ushered in what many consider as its golden literary age. Near the end of that decade was born in La Carlota one of its most famous children in the literary field: Adelina Gurrea. She later gained world prominence as a journalist, poet and novelist in Spain where she espoused women's causes in her writings.

From 1901 to 1906, La Carlota figured prominently in the anti-American resistance movement on Negros. It produced some of the best-known Babaylan leaders, chief among whom was Papa Isio. He led the struggle against the American occupation that replaced the Spanish regime as a result of the Treaty of Paris that ended the Spanish–American War and ceded control of the Philippines to the United States. Babaylans or entrencirados conducted guerrilla warfare against the American forces in the towns of La Carlota, Isabela, Kabankalan and La Castellana. From its humble beginnings as a small settlement, La Carlota has evolved into one of the major sugar-producing cities in the Philippines.

=== Cityhood ===
On June 19, 1965, by virtue of Republic Act No. 4585, La Carlota was granted a city charter, becoming one of the two landlocked cities in Negros Island, the other being neighbouring Canlaon in Negros Oriental.

In 2011, the Department of the Interior and Local Government (DILG) awarded the city with a "seal of good housekeeping" for its efforts in advancing accountability and transparency in local governance. In the same year, it was also named as one of the top-performing local government units in the Philippines, ranking eighth in the component cities category. On December 29, 2011, the city was nominated for excellence in local governance, an honor given by the provincial government under its Pagpasidungog Awards .

== Geography ==
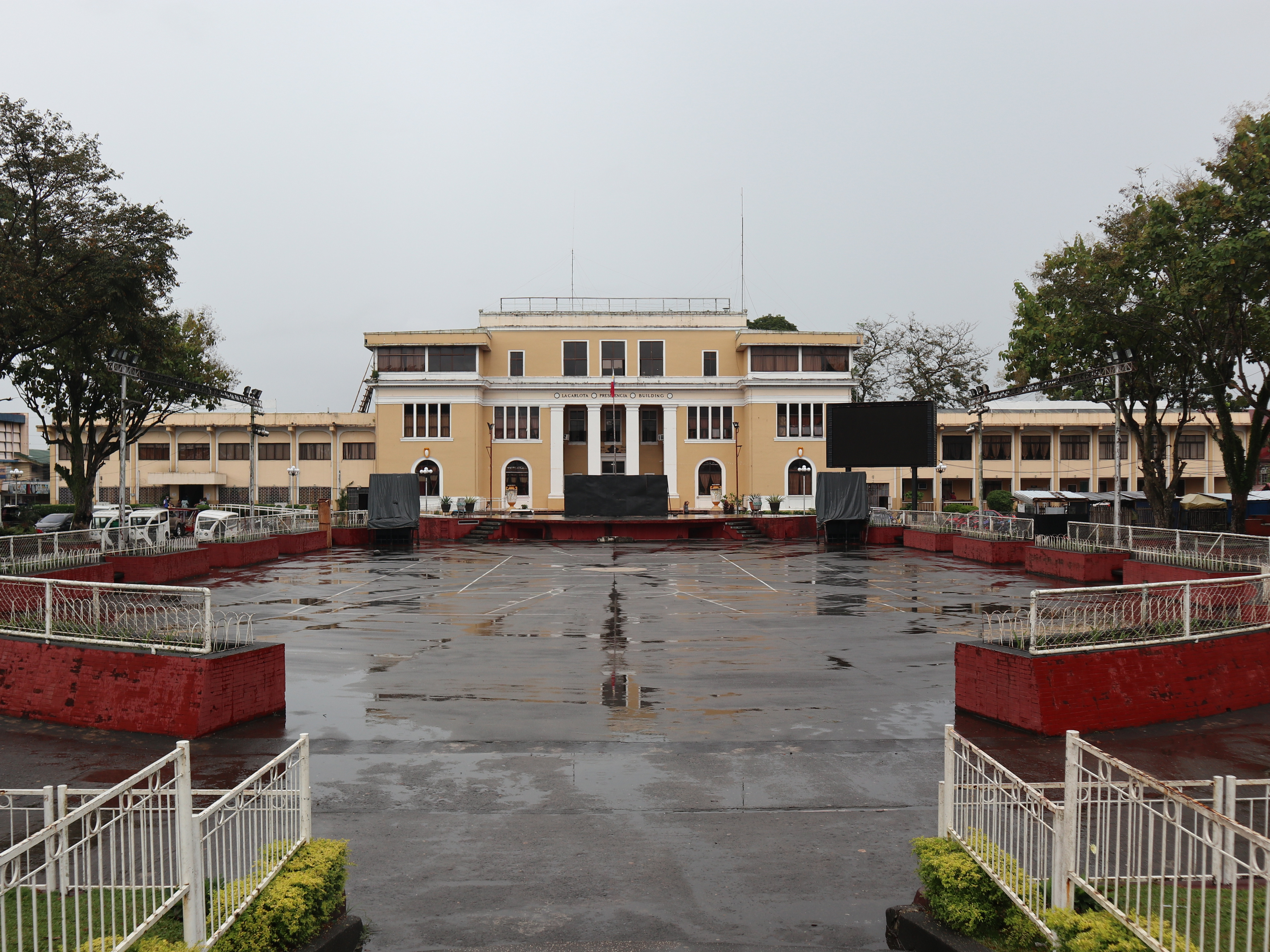
City hall and public plaza

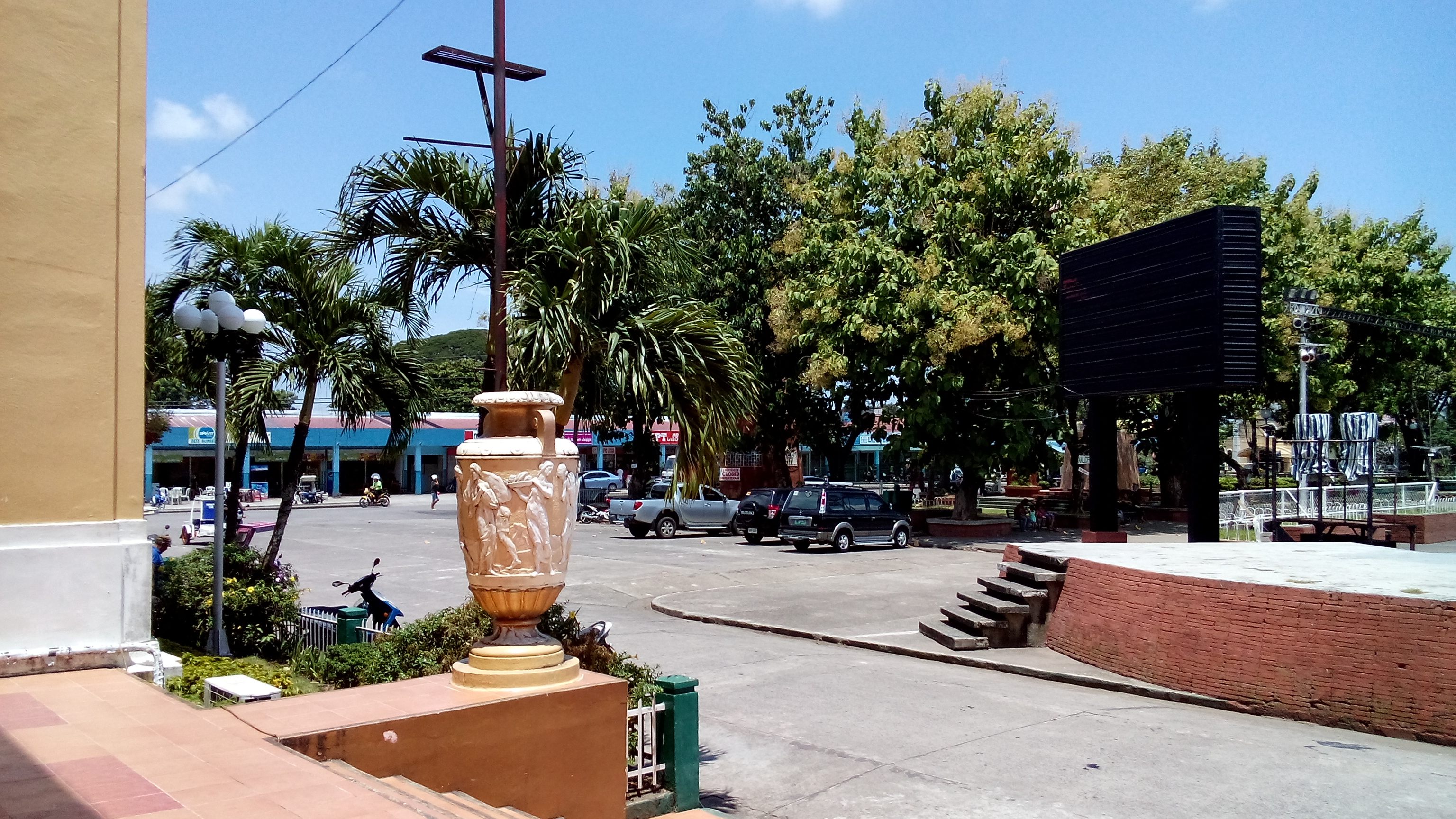
La Carlota Public Plaza

La Carlota City is geographically located at the north-central portion of Negros Occidental. It is bordered in the north by Bago, in the east by Kanlaon Volcano and Canlaon of Negros Oriental, in the southeast by the town of La Castellana, in the southwest by Pontevedra and in the west by San Enrique. It has a total land area of 13,729 ha (137.29 km^{2}), most of it devoted to agriculture.

La Carlota City is 43 kilometres (27 mi) from Bacolod.

=== Barangays ===
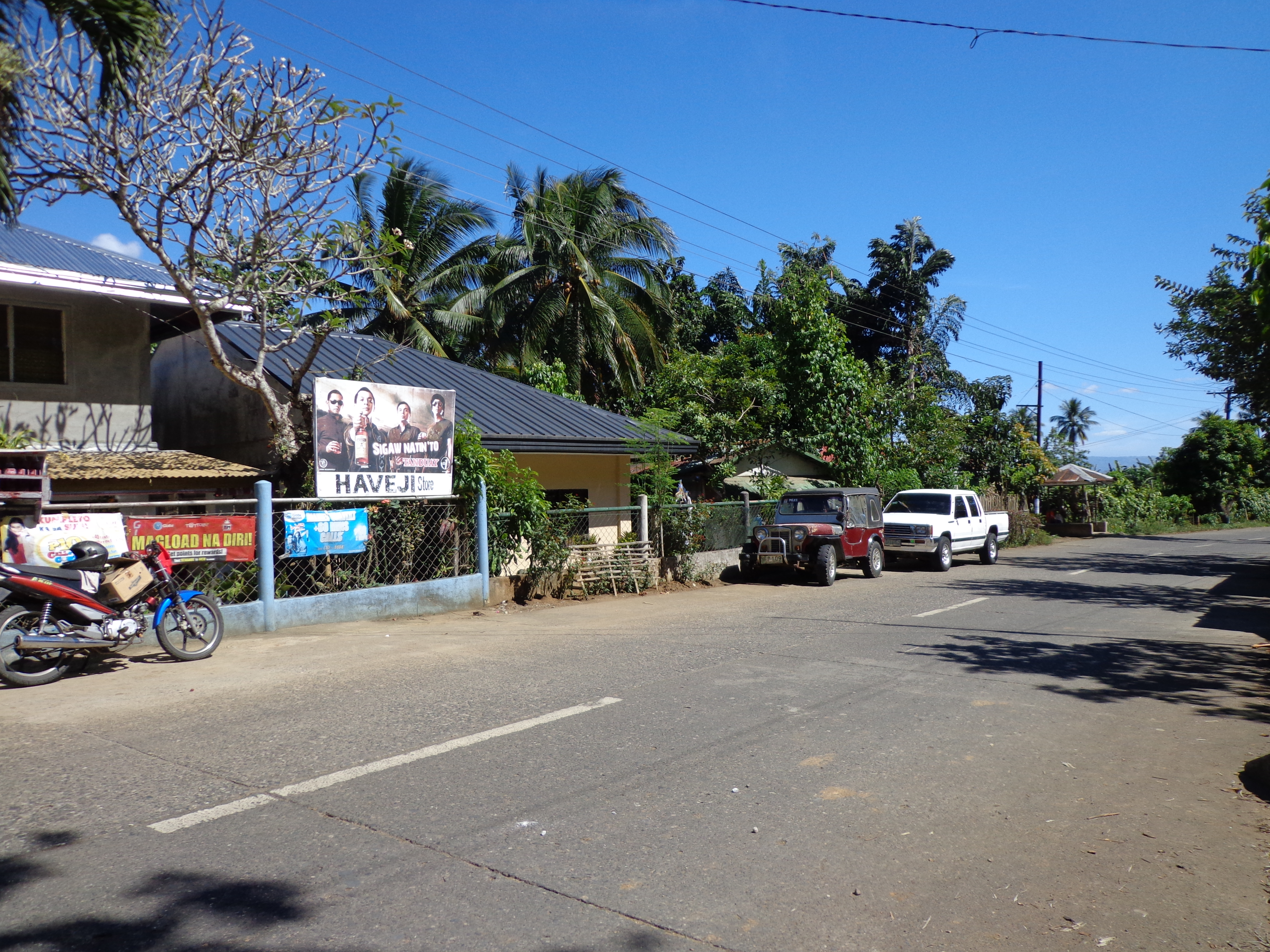
A village in one of the barangays in the city

La Carlota is politically subdivided into 14 barangays. Each barangay consists of puroks and some have sitios.

Currently, there are 3 barangays which considered urban (highlighted in bold). The farthest from the city is Barangay Yubo, which is 17.9 kilometers from the urban core. The city's barangays are as follows:

- Ara-al
- Ayungon
- Balabag
- Batuan
- Cubay
- Haguimit
- La Granja
- Nagasi
- **Barangay I (Poblacion)**
- **Barangay II (Poblacion)**
- **Barangay III (Poblacion)**
- Barangay RSB (Consuelo)
- San Miguel
- Yubo

=== Climate ===
The city enjoys two distinct seasons like the rest of the Philippines: The dry season from January through May and the wet season from June through December.

Climate data for La Carlota, Negros Occidental
Month	Jan	Feb	Mar	Apr	May	Jun	Jul	Aug	Sep	Oct	Nov	Dec	Year
Mean daily maximum °C (°F)	28 (82)	29 (84)	30 (86)	32 (90)	31 (88)	30 (86)	29 (84)	29 (84)	29 (84)	29 (84)	29 (84)	29 (84)	30 (85)
Mean daily minimum °C (°F)	23 (73)	23 (73)	23 (73)	24 (75)	25 (77)	25 (77)	25 (77)	25 (77)	25 (77)	24 (75)	24 (75)	23 (73)	24 (75)
Average precipitation mm (inches)	100 (3.9)	75 (3.0)	90 (3.5)	101 (4.0)	183 (7.2)	242 (9.5)	215 (8.5)	198 (7.8)	205 (8.1)	238 (9.4)	194 (7.6)	138 (5.4)	1,979 (77.9)
Average rainy days	14.9	11.3	14.5	17.4	26.4	28.4	28.5	27.5	26.9	28.4	24.2	17.2	265.6
Source: Meteoblue

== Demographics ==
Population census of La Carlota
Year	Pop.	±% p.a.
1903	13,097	—
1918	20,410	+3.00%
1939	26,084	+1.17%
1948	45,789	+6.45%
1960	56,772	+1.81%
1970	38,321	−3.85%
1975	40,984	+1.36%
1980	45,812	+2.25%
1990	56,443	+2.11%
1995	56,414	−0.01%
2000	56,408	−0.00%
2007	63,584	+1.67%
2010	63,852	+0.15%
2015	64,469	+0.18%
2020	66,664	+0.71%
2024	67,740	+0.39%
Source: Philippine Statistics Authority

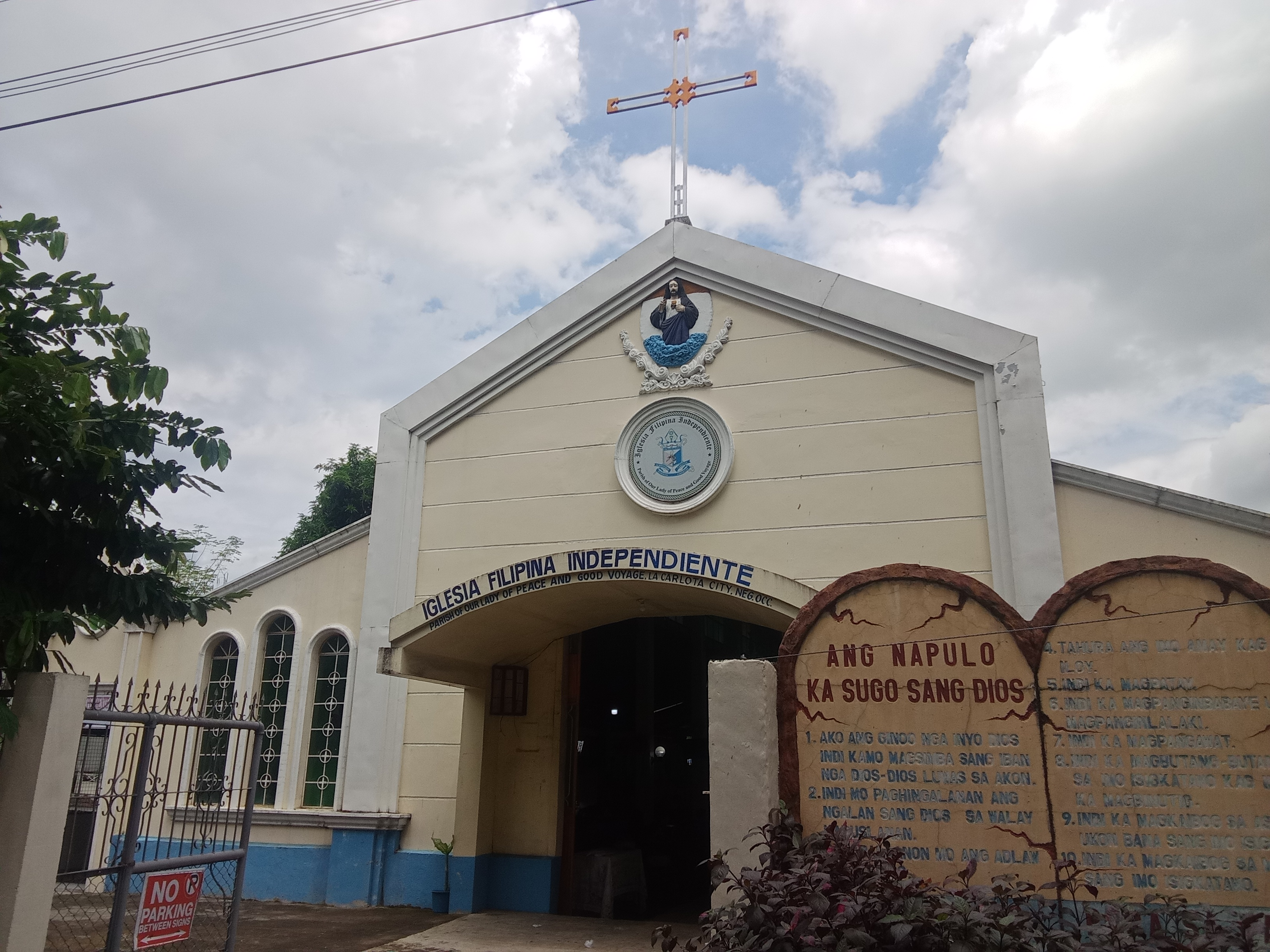
Parish of Our Lady of Peace and Good Voyage of the Iglesia Filipina Independiente (Philippine Independent Church)

The first recorded census, conducted in 1903, pegged the population at 3,097. The 1995 Philippine Statistics Authority survey recorded a population of 56,414. Two years later, the population grew to 57,982, increasing to 62,094 in 2002. By then population density was 4.5 persons per hectare. Of the 14 barangays or villages, Barangay II has the biggest population with 9,221 and Barangay Yubo has the smallest with 1,962.

=== Languages ===
About 96% of the people use a local Negrense variant of Hiligaynon as their main language of communication, while the remaining 4% of the population use Cebuano. English and Tagalog are generally understood and spoken by a large segment of the city's population, especially amongst the well-educated peoples.

== Economy ==
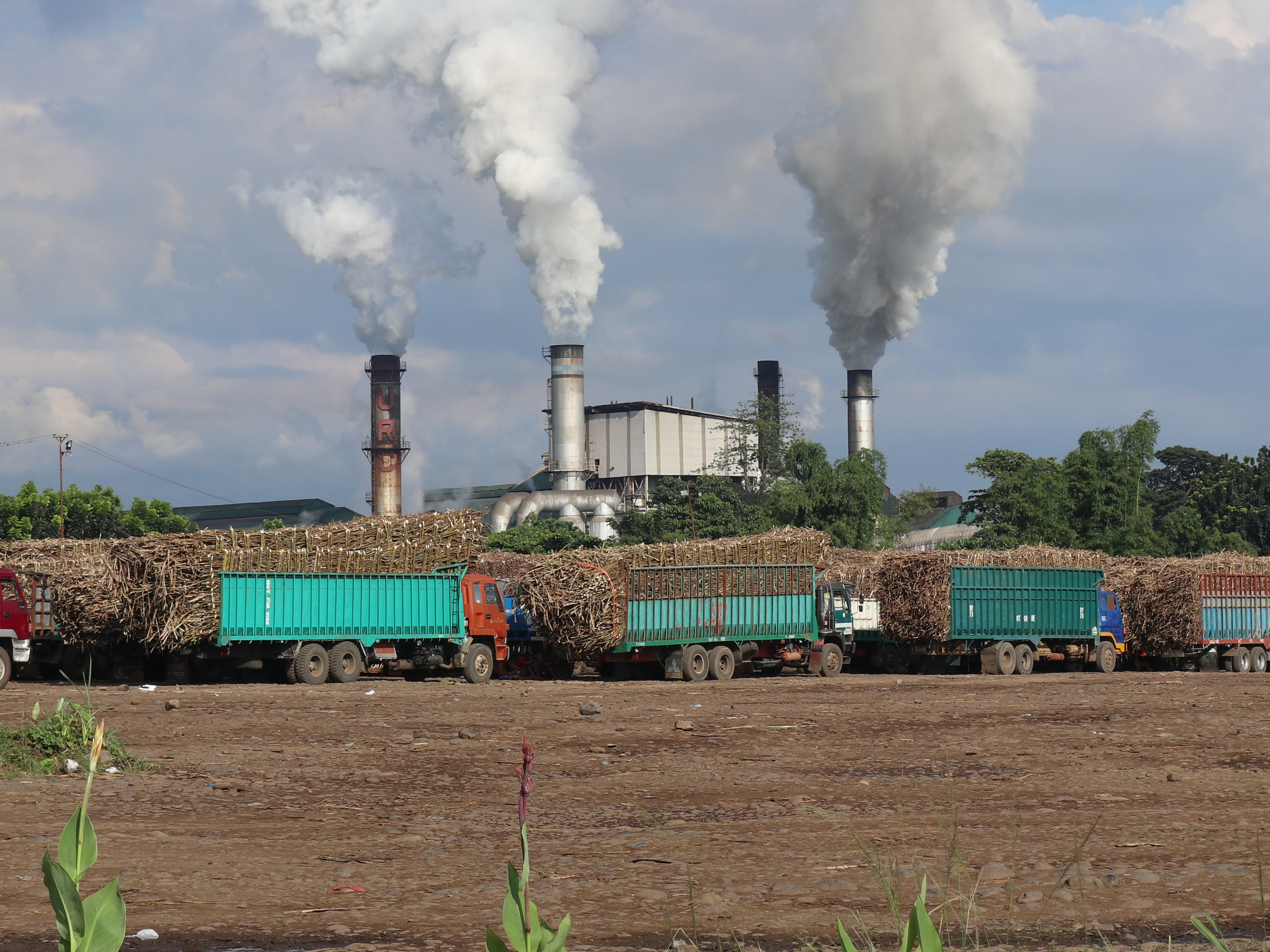
URC sugar mill

Poverty incidence of La Carlota

Source: Philippine Statistics Authority

== Tourism ==
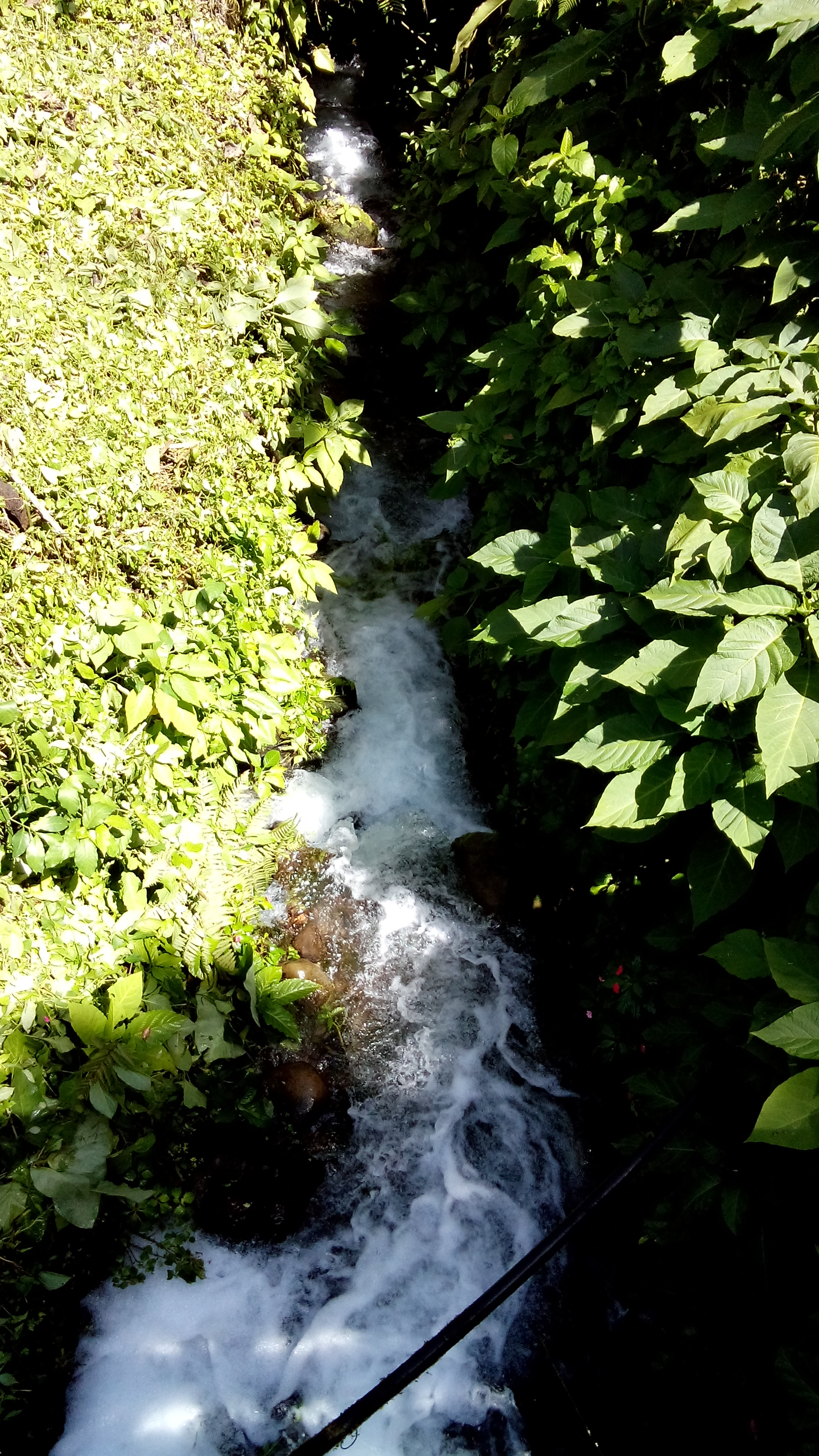
A portion of Guintubdan Falls

Our Lady of Peace and Good Voyage Roman Catholic Church
Standing in the heart of La Carlota City on La Paz Street, Barangay I, Poblacion is this old church, built in 1876 during the Spanish era. It has the distinction as one of the very few churches of Romanesque architectural design in the region.

A distinct quality of this church was its use of Silay red bricks and coral stones bonded together by lime mixed in duck eggs as a binder. The materials were taken from Guimaras Island. The church was built by Filipinos forced to work under the polo system during the Spanish regime. The unpopular practice required Filipino males from age 16 to 60 to render free labor constructing churches, roads, bridges and other infrastructure for a total of forty days during the year.

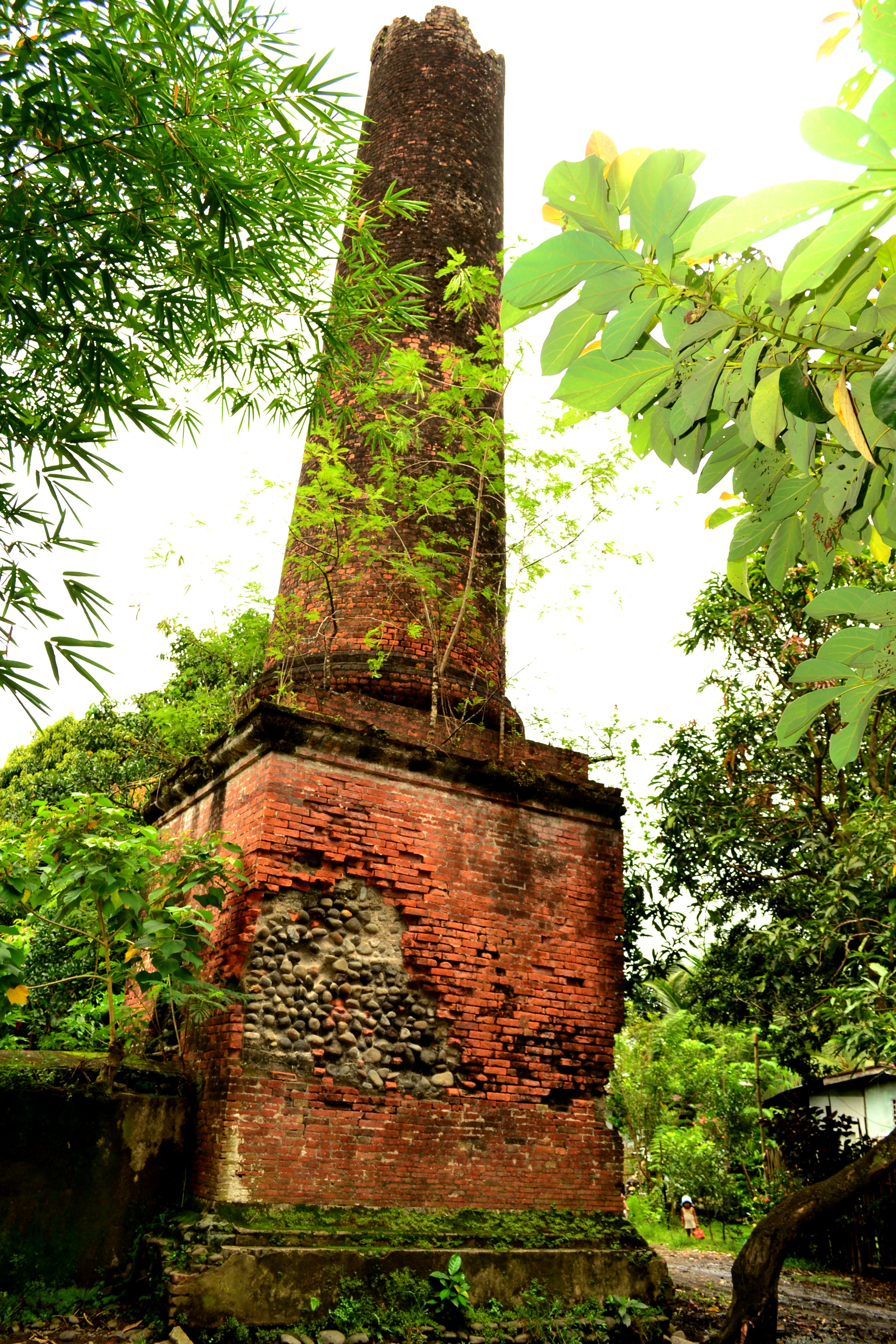
Muscovado Sugar Mill Brick Chimney

Muscovado Sugar Mill Brick Chimney Ruins
This muscovado sugar mill brick chimney at Hacienda Canman-ug, Barangay Batuan was constructed before the establishment of Central Azucarera de La Carlota. It was powered by an A & W Smith Company steam engine manufactured in 1883 in Glasgow. This tourist destination offers a glimpse into the lives of Mangkasanons over a century ago and serves as a vehicle of knowledge on how the sugar industry in this part of the world has evolved.

Iron Dinosaurs of Central Azucarera de La Carlota
Visitors entering through the western part of the city are greeted by a black vintage steam locomotive, which the locals have dubbed as the “Iron Dinosaur” of La Carlota.

Infante Heritage House
On December 12, 2001, the house was designated by the National Historical Institute as a heritage house, and a historical marker was placed on the property.

Presidencia Building
The seat of the local government, constructed in 1934, is a landmark in the city center.

La Granja Agricolas
This agricultural model farm was established in 1881 through a Spanish royal decree issued on November 15, 1881, and was formally opened on July 8, 1884. The Philippines government maintains a stock farm in Barangay La Granja as well as a research center established by the Philippine Sugar Commission.

Agora Public Market
It was constructed in 1981 to replace the old public market of La Carlota that was destroyed by fire in 1978. It is named after the Greek term "Agora", which stands for a public open space used for assemblies and markets. It is located just a few meters away from the public plaza.

== Festivals ==
- Pasalamat Festival:
- The Christmas Festival of Lights and Music:

== Notable personalities ==
- Manuel Amechazurra - Football player for FC Barcelona
- Carlos Baylon Jr. - wushu athlete, Sanda World Cup gold medalist, World Wushu Championships silver medalist, 2023 SEA Games bronze medalist
- Roberto Benedicto -Philippine Ambassador to Japan, Chairman of the Philippine National Bank, Business Tycoon. In 1983 it was estimated that he had a net worth of $800 million or $2.5 billion equivalent amount in 2025
- Jeffrey Ferrer - Member of the House of Representatives of the Philippines , Vice Governor of Negros Occidental
- Juliet Marie Ferrer - Member of the House of Representatives of the Philippines
- Raul M. Gonzalez - 55th Secretary of Justice (Philippines)
- Adelina Gurrea - Spanish Filipino poet and journalist.
- Gilbert Luis R. Centina III - Filipino-American novelist and prize-winning poet.
- Luis T. Centina Jr. - Filipino-American author.
- Pancho Villa - World flyweight champion from 1923 to 1925.
- Small Montana - World flyweight crown holder from 1935 to 1938.
- Little Dado (Eleuterio Zapanta) - Boxer from 1938 to 1944.

== Sister Cities ==
- Carson, California, United States
