= Thomas Louis Green =

English Catholic priest and apologist

Thomas Louis Green (1799–1883) was an English Catholic priest and apologist.

His first posting as a priest was in Norwich from 1828 to 1830 where he gained a reputation as a controversial preacher but refused a public debate because of the chances of anti-Catholic riots. He later became a chaplain to Catholic gentry first to Sir Thomas Clifford-Constable and then after postings in his old seminary in Oscott, a priory in Coventry and two parishes in Shropshire, he became chaplain to Lord Acton in 1860.

He contributed to the Catholic periodicals "Orthodox Journal", "Catholic Magazine" and "True Tablet".

== Works ==
- A series of discourses on the principal controverted points of Catholic Doctrine delivered at . . . Norwich' (Norwich, 1830), reprinted under the title "Argumentative Discourses" in 1837
- A Correspondence between the Protestant Rector of Tixall and the Catholic Chaplain of Sir Clifford Constable
- A Letter addressed to Rev. Clement Leigh (London, 1836)
- The Truth, the Whole Truth, and Nothing but the Truth
- The Secular Clergy Fund of the late Midland District (London, 1853, privately printed)
- Rome, Purgatory, Indulgences, Idolatry, etc.
- Indulgences, Sacramental Absolutions and Tax Tables of the Roman Chancery and Penitentiary considered in reply to the charge of Venality (London, 1872, 1880)
