= Tom Green (basketball) =

American basketball player and coach

Biographical details
- Born: August 29, 1949 (age 77); Brockway, Pennsylvania, U.S.

Playing career
- 1968–1971: Syracuse
- Position: Point guard

Coaching career (HC unless noted)
- 1971–1972: Drew (assistant)
- 1972–1976: Syracuse (assistant)
- 1976–1983: Tulane (assistant)
- 1983–2009: Fairleigh Dickinson
- 2011–2017: CCNY

Head coaching record
- Overall: 464–445 (.510)
- Tournaments: 0–4 (NCAA Division I); 0–2 (NIT)

Accomplishments and honors

Championships
- 4 ECACM/NEC tournament (1985, 1988, 1998, 2005); 4 ECACM/NEC regular season (1986, 1988, 1991, 2006)

Awards
- 2× ECACM/NEC Coach of the Year (1985, 1986)

Tom Green (born August 29, 1949) is an American basketball coach and former player. He is the former head basketball coach at the City College of New York. He was previously the head coach at Fairleigh Dickinson University in Hackensack / Teaneck, New Jersey, where he led the team to a 407–351 record in 26 seasons leading the team. Green had led the Knights to two National Invitation Tournament bids and four NCAA Men's Division I Basketball Championship appearances, the most recent in 2004–05 when the team played the top-seeded University of Illinois and lost by 12 points after trailing by one at the half, losing to a team that lost in the National Championship game to the University of North Carolina.

Green led the Fairleigh Dickinson University Knights to postseason tournament championships in the Northeast Conference in 1985, 1988, 1998 and 2005, and won league regular season titles in 1986, 1988 and again in 2006. Green was named Northeast Conference Coach of the Year in 1985 and 1986. He coached the team to consecutive seasons with 20 wins in both 2004–05 and 2005–06.

== Career ==
Green was named as head coach by FDU in May 1983, succeeding J. Donald Feeley, whose recruiting had led to a team stocked with players who had academic problems.

Green led the team to a 21–10 record in the 1984–85 season. The team won in the ECAC Metro Conference and earned itself a berth in the 1985 NCAA tournament, the first in team history. FDU lost to the top-seeded University of Michigan by a score of 59–55 in the tourney's first round.

His last two seasons with the Knights were described by The Record as "two of the worst of Green's career", with the team going 8–20 in 2007–08, which deteriorated to 7–23 (3–13 in conference play) in 2008–09, in what turned out to be his final season as head coach. The team missed the Northeast Conference playoffs in both seasons, and his 400th win in the final game of the 2007–08 season was one of the few highlights of these seasons.

With one year remaining on his contract, Green was dismissed by FDU athletic director David Langford, who recognized Green's contributions and noted that "Coach Green has worked for FDU for 26 years and done a lot of good things, and helped the university with its visibility and we're very thankful to him for that." Green criticized the circumstances of his dismissal, stating that "This decision kills my career" and that he had hoped to spend some five more years coaching and had built up a healthy team for the 2009–10 season that he had already begun practices with during the spring.

Green then took the job as head coach at The City College of New York in the 2011–12 season. He replaced Andy Stampfel, who coached the last CCNY men's basketball conference championship team back in 2003. Under Green, the team reached the playoffs four times, including a trip to the CUNY Athletic Conference Championship Game in 2017 after posting a 17–10 record. The CCNY Beavers lost to Staten Island 77–66, but Green's 2016–2017 season was CCNY's best single-season record since the 1950–51 championship team that was involved in a point-shaving scandal. Following a severe slash to the CCNY athletic department's budget, Green resigned as head coach in the summer of 2017.

== Head coaching record ==
Record table
Season	Team	Overall	Conference	Standing	Postseason
Fairleigh Dickinson Knights (Eastern College Athletic Conference Metro / Northeast Conference) (1983–2009)
1983–84	Fairleigh Dickinson	17–12	10–6	T–3rd	
1984–85	Fairleigh Dickinson	21–10	10–4	2nd	NCAA Division I First Round
1985–86	Fairleigh Dickinson	22–8	13–3	1st	
1986–87	Fairleigh Dickinson	19–10	11–5	2nd	
1987–88	Fairleigh Dickinson	23–7	13–3	T–1st	NCAA Division I First Round
1988–89	Fairleigh Dickinson	17–12	11–5	2nd	
1989–90	Fairleigh Dickinson	16–13	8–8	6th	
1990–91	Fairleigh Dickinson	22–9	13–3	T–1st	NIT First Round
1991–92	Fairleigh Dickinson	14–14	11–5	T–2nd	
1992–93	Fairleigh Dickinson	11–17	8–10	T–5th	
1993–94	Fairleigh Dickinson	14–13	10–8	T–5th	
1994–95	Fairleigh Dickinson	16–12	11–7	T–4th	
1995–96	Fairleigh Dickinson	7–20	6–12	7th	
1996–97	Fairleigh Dickinson	18–10	13–5	2nd	
1997–98	Fairleigh Dickinson	23–7	13–3	2nd	NCAA Division I First Round
1998–99	Fairleigh Dickinson	12–16	9–11	7th	
1999–00	Fairleigh Dickinson	17–11	13–5	T–2nd	
2000–01	Fairleigh Dickinson	13–15	10–10	7th	
2001–02	Fairleigh Dickinson	4–25	4–16	11th	
2002–03	Fairleigh Dickinson	15–14	9–9	T–6th	
2003–04	Fairleigh Dickinson	17–12	11–7	3rd	
2004–05	Fairleigh Dickinson	20–13	13–5	2nd	NCAA Division I First Round
2005–06	Fairleigh Dickinson	20–12	14–4	1st	NIT Opening Round
2006–07	Fairleigh Dickinson	14–16	9–9	T–4th	
2007–08	Fairleigh Dickinson	8–20	4–14	T–8th	
2008–09	Fairleigh Dickinson	7–23	6–12	T–9th	
Fairleigh Dickinson:		407–351 (.537)	263–189 (.582)		
CCNY Beavers (City University of New York Athletic Conference) (2011–2017)
2011–12	CCNY	2–22	1–10	5th (North)	
2012–13	CCNY	10–16	6–10	6th	
2013–14	CCNY	7–17	3–11	7th	
2014–15	CCNY	8–16	3–12	8th	
2015–16	CCNY	13–13	7–9	T–6th	
2016–17	CCNY	17–10	12–4	2nd	
CCNY:		57–94 (.377)	32–56 (.364)		
Total:		464–445 (.510)			
National champion Postseason invitational champion Conference regular season champion Conference regular season and conference tournament champion Division regular season champion Division regular season and conference tournament champion Conference tournament champion
