= Tom Greene (Florida politician) =

American politician

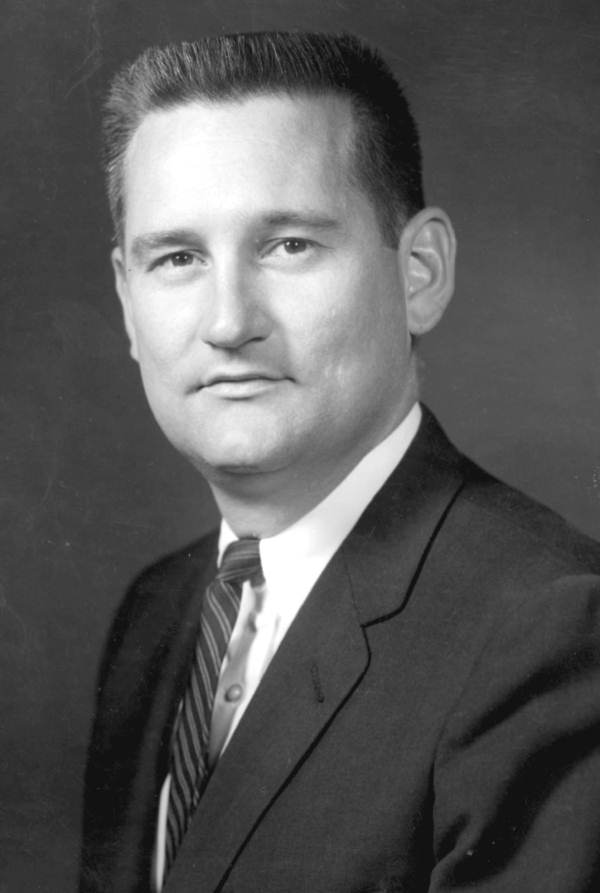

Member of the Florida House of Representatives from the Duval County district
- In office 1963–1966

Personal details
- Born: August 2, 1932 (age 94) Jacksonville, Florida, U.S.
- Party: Democratic
- Education: University of Florida, Stetson University College of Law
- Occupation: attorney

Tom H. Greene (born August 2, 1932) is a politician and lawyer in the American state of Florida. He served in the Florida House of Representatives from 1963 to 1966, representing Duval County. He also briefly served in the State Senate, from 1966 to 1967.
