= Catholic Authors Award =

Catholic Authors Awards
- Description: Annual awards honoring authors and communicators who promote Gospel values in their works
- Location: Manila
- Country: Philippines
- Presented by: Asian Catholic Publishers, Inc. and the Archdiocese of Manila

The Catholic Authors Awards are given annually by the Asian Catholic Publishers in Manila, Philippines, in coordination with the Archdiocese of Manila. Catholic authors who have a track record of excellence in their craft have to be nominated by previous winners to be considered for the award by the Asian Catholic Publishers. A screening committee is tasked to pick the winners.

== History and purpose ==
The awards were established in 1989 by the Asian Catholic Publishers, Inc., upon the initiative of Cardinal Jaime Sin, to honor men and women who promote the values of the Gospel in their writings, compositions, and their work in the communications field. Since its inception, the awards have encouraged more priests, religious men and women and laypeople to venture into more active participation in communications through the publication of books and other materials.
