= St. Francis Brooklyn Terriers men's basketball statistical leaders =

The St. Francis Brooklyn Terriers men's basketball statistical leaders are individual statistical leaders of the St. Francis Brooklyn Terriers men's basketball program in various categories, including points, assists, blocks, rebounds, and steals. Within those areas, the lists identify single-game, single-season, and career leaders. The Terriers represented Saint Francis College (SFC) in the NCAA Division I Northeast Conference from the conference's formation in 1981 until SFC shut down its athletic program after the 2022–23 season.

St. Francis Brooklyn began competing in intercollegiate basketball in 1901. However, the school's record book does not generally list records from before the 1950s, as records from before this period are often incomplete and inconsistent. Since scoring was much lower in this era, and teams played much fewer games during a typical season, it is likely that few or no players from this era would appear on these lists anyway.

The NCAA did not officially record assists as a statistic in Division I until the 1983–84 season, and blocks and steals until the 1985–86 season, but SFC's record books include players in these stats before these seasons. These lists are updated through the end of the 2022–23 season, the last season before SFC shut down its athletic program.

== Scoring ==
Career
Rk	Player	Points	Seasons
1	Jalen Cannon	1,720	2011–12 2012–13 2013–14 2014–15
2	Ricky Cadell	1,643	2007–08 2008–09 2009–10 2010–11
3	Darrwin Purdie	1,613	1985–86 1986–87 1987–88 1988–89
4	Dennis McDermott	1,578	1971–72 1972–73 1973–74
5	Manny Figueroa	1,532	1975–76 1976–77 1977–78 1978–79
6	Al Inniss	1,503	1954–55 1955–56 1956–57 1957–58
7	Jerome Williams	1,490	1972–73 1973–74 1974–75 1975–76
8	Richy Dominguez	1,482	1997–98 1998–99 1999–00 2000–01
9	Angel Santana	1,476	1996–97 1997–98 1998–99 1999–00
10	John Conforti	1,435	1967–68 1968–69 1969–70

Season
Rk	Player	Points	Season
1	Ray Minlend	680	1998–99
2	Ken Lam	605	1971–72
3	Steven Howard	587	2000–01
4	Dennis McDermott	578	1972–73
5	Dennis McDermott	571	1973–74
6	Jalen Cannon	564	2014–15
7	John Conforti	560	1968–69
8	Richy Dominguez	541	2000–01
9	Robert Jackson	535	1983–84
10	Nestor Cora	532	1977–78

Single game
Rk	Player	Points	Season	Opponent
1	John Conforti	45	1969–70	Wagner

== Rebounds ==
Career
Rk	Player	Rebounds	Seasons
1	Al Inniss	1,667	1954–55 1955–56 1956–57 1957–58
2	Jalen Cannon	1,159	2011–12 2012–13 2013–14 2014–15
3	Jerome Williams	1,018	1972–73 1973–74 1974–75 1975–76
4	Darrwin Purdie	748	1985–86 1986–87 1987–88 1988–89
5	Dennis McDermott	708	1971–72 1972–73 1973–74
6	Robert Jackson	675	1981–82 1982–83 1983–84
7	Heberth Reyes	666	1997–98 1998–99 1999–00 2000–01
8	Richy Dominguez	651	1997–98 1998–99 1999–00 2000–01
9	Manny Figueroa	636	1975–76 1976–77 1977–78 1978–79
10	Cliff Strong	596	2000–01 2001–02 2002–03

Season
Rk	Player	Rebounds	Season
1	Al Inniss	477	1957–58
2	Al Inniss	465	1955–56
3	Al Inniss	405	1956–57
4	Jalen Cannon	367	2014–15
5	Al Inniss	320	1954–55
6	Jerome Williams	311	1974–75
7	Jerome Williams	279	1975–76
8	Manny Figueroa	271	1976–77
9	Jerome Williams	268	1973–74
10	Jalen Cannon	265	2011–12

Single game
Rk	Player	Rebounds	Season	Opponent
1	Al Inniss	37	1955–56	Lafayette

== Assists ==
Career
Rk	Player	Assists	Seasons
1	Brent Jones	616	2011–12 2012–13 2013–14 2014–15
2	Greg Nunn	534	1997–98 1998–99 1999–00 2000–01
3	Tory Cavalieri	465	2002–03 2003–04 2004–05
4	Edgar DeLaRosa	393	1978–79 1979–80 1981–82 1982–83
5	Rodney Henry	346	1985–86 1986–87 1987–88 1988–89
6	Glenn Sanabria	326	2014–15 2015–16 2016–17 2017–18 2018–19
7	Jim Paguaga	317	1981–82 1982–83 1984–85 1985–86
8	Jamaal Womack	312	2005–06 2006–07 2007–08 2008–09
9	Lynn Smith	301	1990–91 1991–92
10	John Arnold	293	1988–89 1989–90 1990–91 1991–92

Season
Rk	Player	Assists	Season
1	Jim Paguaga	223	1985–86
2	Brent Jones	187	2013–14
3	Lynn Smith	185	1990–91
4	Brent Jones	184	2014–15
	Greg Nunn	184	1999–00
6	Tory Cavalieri	169	2002–03
7	Edgar DeLaRosa	167	1982–83
8	Tory Cavalieri	162	2003–04
9	Greg Nunn	157	2000–01
10	Edgar DeLaRosa	154	1981–82

Single game
Rk	Player	Assists	Season	Opponent
1	Jim Paguaga	16	1985–86	York

== Steals ==
Career
Rk	Player	Steals	Seasons
1	Greg Nunn	202	1997–98 1998–99 1999–00 2000–01
2	Tory Cavalieri	194	2002–03 2003–04 2004–05
3	Lynn Smith	173	1990–91 1991–92
4	Richy Dominguez	171	1997–98 1998–99 1999–00 2000–01
5	Edgar DeLaRosa	160	1978–79 1979–80 1981–82 1982–83
6	Jim Paguaga	157	1981–82 1982–83 1984–85 1985–86
7	Rodney Henry	154	1985–86 1986–87 1987–88 1988–89
8	Jamaal Womack	148	2005–06 2006–07 2007–08 2008–09
9	Lou Myers	143	1989–90 1990–91 1991–92 1992–93
10	Akeem Bennett	140	2009–10 2010–11

Season
Rk	Player	Steals	Season
1	Jim Paguaga	120	1985–86
2	Lynn Smith	100	1990–91
3	Jeff Myers	81	1992–93
4	Ray Minlend	79	1998–99
5	Akeem Bennett	76	2010–11
6	Tory Cavalieri	75	2003–04
7	John Thomas	74	1997–98
8	Lynn Smith	73	1991–92
9	Greg Nunn	71	1998–99
10	Brent Jones	66	2014–15

Single game
Rk	Player	Steals	Season	Opponent
1	Ron Arnold	11	1992–93	Mt. St. Mary's

== Blocks ==
Career
Rk	Player	Blocks	Seasons
1	Julian McKelly	244	1981–82 1982–83 1983–84 1985–86
2	Amdy Fall	210	2013–14 2014–15 2015–16
3	Heberth Reyes	186	1997–98 1998–99 1999–00 2000–01
4	Richard Lugo	125	1996–97
5	Devon Neckles	109	2002–03 2003–04 2004–05 2005–06
6	Robert Jackson	102	1981–82 1982–83 1983–84
7	Chris Sockwell	94	2001–02 2002–03
8	Darrwin Purdie	85	1985–86 1986–87 1987–88 1988–89
9	Lester James	78	1990–91 1991–92
	Herman Wrice	78	2008–09 2009–10

Season
Rk	Player	Blocks	Season
1	Richard Lugo	125	1996–97
2	Julian McKelly	108	1982–83
3	Amdy Fall	80	2014–15
4	Amdy Fall	75	2015–16
5	Heberth Reyes	71	2000–01
6	Amdy Fall	55	2013–14
7	Devon Neckles	52	2003–04
8	Herman Wrice	51	2008–09
9	Lester James	50	1990–91
10	Chris Sockwell	48	2001–02
	Julian McKelly	48	1983–84
	Heberth Reyes	48	1998–99

Single game
Rk	Player	Blocks	Season	Opponent
1	Richard Lugo	11	1996–97	Rider
