= 1983 ECAC Metro men's basketball tournament =

- Classification: Division I
- Season: 1982–83
- Teams: 10
- Site: Campus sites
- Finals site: John Jay Center; Moon Township, PA
- Champions: Robert Morris (2nd title)
- Winning coach: Matthew Furjanic Jr. (2nd title)
- MVP: Chipper Harris (Robert Morris)
- ECAC Metro men's basketball tournaments

1982–83 ECAC Metro men's basketball standings
	Conf.				Overall
Team	W		L	PCT	W		L	PCT
North
Long Island	11	–	3	.786	20	–	9	.690
Fairleigh Dickinson	9	–	5	.643	17	–	12	.586
St. Francis (NY)	7	–	7	.500	10	–	18	.357
Marist	7	–	7	.500	14	–	15	.483
Siena	6	–	8	.429	12	–	16	.429
Wagner	2	–	12	.143	10	–	18	.357
South
Robert Morris †	12	–	2	.857	23	–	8	.742
Saint Francis (PA)	7	–	7	.500	12	–	17	.414
Baltimore	4	–	10	.286	10	–	18	.357
Loyola (MD)	3	–	11	.214	4	–	24	.143
† 1983 ECAC Metro tournament winner Rankings from AP Poll

The 1983 ECAC Metro men's basketball tournament (now known as the Northeast Conference men's basketball tournament) was held March 9–12. The quarterfinal and semifinal rounds were played on campus sites with the championship game held at John Jay Center in Moon Township, Pennsylvania.

Robert Morris defeated Long Island University in the championship game, 79–67, to win back-to-back ECAC Metro men's basketball tournaments. The Colonials earned the automatic bid to the 1983 NCAA Tournament.

== Bracket ==
First round Thursday, March 9	Quarterfinals; Friday, March 10
1N	Long Island	74
4N	Marist	56
4N	Marist	60
5N	Siena	59
North
3N	St. Francis (NY)	65
6N	Wagner	67
6N	Wagner	84
2N	Fairleigh Dickinson	94
1S	Robert Morris	81
4S	Loyola (MD)	60
South
3S	Baltimore	68
2S	Saint Francis (PA)	75

Semifinals; Saturday, March 11
1N	Long Island	101
2N	Fairleigh Dickinson	98
1S	Robert Morris	106
2S	Saint Francis (PA)	94

Championship; Sunday, March 12
1N	Long Island	67
1S	Robert Morris	79
