= 1985–86 Marist Red Foxes men's basketball team =

American college basketball season

1985–86 Marist Red Foxes men's basketball
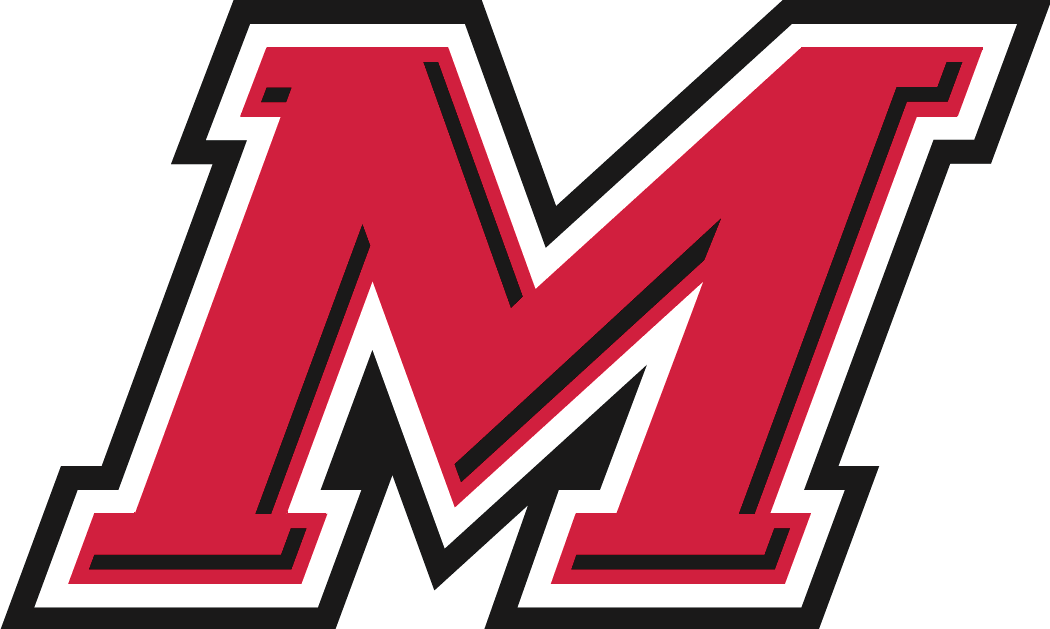

ECAC Metro tournament champions

NCAA tournament, first round
- Conference: Eastern Collegiate Athletic Conference Metro
- Record: 19–12 (11–5 ECACM)
- Head coach: Matthew Furjanic Jr. (2nd season)
- Home arena: McCann Recreation Center

1985–86 ECAC Metro men's basketball standings
	Conf.				Overall
Team	W		L	PCT	W		L	PCT
Fairleigh Dickinson	13	–	3	.813	22	–	8	.733
Marist†	11	–	5	.688	19	–	12	.613
Loyola (MD)	10	–	6	.625	16	–	12	.571
Wagner	10	–	6	.625	16	–	13	.552
Saint Francis (PA)	8	–	8	.500	10	–	18	.357
Robert Morris	6	–	10	.375	10	–	18	.357
Monmouth*	6	–	10	.375	9	–	19	.321
St. Francis (NY)	4	–	12	.250	9	–	19	.321
Long Island	4	–	12	.250	9	–	19	.321
† 1986 ECAC Metro tournament winner Rankings from AP Poll; *Ineligible for conference tournament

The 1985–86 Marist Red Foxes men's basketball team represented Marist College in the 1985–86 NCAA Division I men's basketball season. The Red Foxes, led by second-year head coach Matthew Furjanic Jr., played their home games at the James J. McCann Recreation Center in Poughkeepsie, New York as members of the ECAC Metro Conference. They finished the season 19–12, 11–5 in ECACM play to finish in second place. As the No. 2 seed in the ECAC tournament, they advanced to the championship game, where they defeated top-seeded Fairleigh Dickinson 57–56 in overtime to win the school's first ECAC Metro men's basketball tournament title. The Red Foxes earned the automatic bid to the 1986 NCAA tournament, receiving a 15 seed in the Southeast region. They were defeated in the first round 53–68 by No. 6 Georgia Tech.

== Previous season ==
The Red Foxes finished the 1984–85 season 17–12 overall, 11–3 in ECACM play to finish in first place, winning the ECACM regular season championship. As the No. 1 seed in the ECAC tournament, the Red Foxes advanced to the semifinals where they were defeated by No. 4 seed Loyola (MD) 55–56 in double overtime.

== Roster ==
1985–86 Marist Red Foxes men's basketball team
Players
Coaches

Pos.	#	Name	Height	Weight	Year	Hometown
G	3	Drafton Davis	6 ft 0 in (1.83 m)	165 lb (75 kg)	So	Bronx, NY
G	5	John McDonough	6 ft 3 in (1.91 m)	180 lb (82 kg)	So	Lincroft, NJ
F	10	Alain Forestier	6 ft 6 in (1.98 m)	200 lb (91 kg)	Jr	Nice, France
G	11	Matt Schoenfeld	5 ft 9 in (1.75 m)	160 lb (73 kg)	Fr	Roselle, NJ
G	15	Carlton Wade	5 ft 11 in (1.8 m)	160 lb (73 kg)	Fr	Clairton, PA
G	20	Tim Murphy	6 ft 4 in (1.93 m)	185 lb (84 kg)	Jr	Cromwell, CT
F	22	Peter Krasovec	6 ft 7 in (2.01 m)	200 lb (91 kg)	Fr	Budapest, Hungary
F	24	Michael Fielder	6 ft 4 in (1.93 m)	199 lb (90 kg)	So	Garden Grove, CA
G	32	Tim Beckwith	6 ft 4 in (1.93 m)	185 lb (84 kg)	Fr	Hampton, VA
C	40	Rudy Bourgarel	7 ft 0 in (2.13 m)	225 lb (102 kg)	Fr	Les Abymes, Guadeloupe
G	41	Ron McCants	6 ft 2 in (1.88 m)	175 lb (79 kg)	Jr	Bronx, NY
F	42	Miroslav Pecarski	6 ft 11 in (2.11 m)	210 lb (95 kg)	Fr	Novi Sad, Yugoslavia
F	44	Mark Shamley	6 ft 6 in (1.98 m)	190 lb (86 kg)	Jr	White Plains, NY
C	45	Rik Smits	7 ft 3 in (2.21 m)	240 lb (109 kg)	So	Eindhoven, Netherlands

Head coach

- Matthew Furjanic Jr. (Point Park College)

Assistant coach(es)

- Bogdan Jovicic
- Jim Todd

Legend

- (C) Team captain
- (S) Suspended
- (I) Ineligible
- (W) Walk-on
- Injured
- Current redshirt

Roster
Last update: January 7, 2021

== Schedule and results ==
Date time, TV	Rank^{#}	Opponent^{#}	Result	Record	Site (attendance) city, state
Regular season
November 26, 1985*		Suffolk University	W 69–34	1–0	McCann Recreation Center (2526); Poughkeepsie, New York
December 3, 1985*		at Cornell	L 65–73 ^{OT}	1–1	Barton Hall (600); Ithaca, New York
December 9, 1985*		Boston University	L 68–86	1–2	McCann Recreation Center (2909); Poughkeepsie, New York
December 11, 1985*		at No. 14 St. Johns	L 48–62	1–3	Carnesecca Arena (6008); Queens, NY
December 14, 1985*		Coppin State; Pepsi Marist Classic	W 73–62	2–3	McCann Recreation Center (1712); Poughkeepsie, New York
December 15, 1985*		Central Connecticut State; Pepsi Marist Classic	W 59–58	3–3	McCann Recreation Center (1563); Poughkeepsie, New York
December 21, 1985*		at Saint Peter's	L 50–52	3–4	Yanitelli Center (1044); Jersey City, New Jersey
December 23, 1985*		at Fairfield	L 58–62	3–5	Alumni Hall (1297); Fairfield, Connecticut
December 30, 1985*		at Iona	W 87–68	4–5	Hynes Athletic Center (2230); New Rochelle, New York
January 4, 1986*		at Villanova	L 71–87	4–6	Jake Nevin Field House (3200); Villanova, Pennsylvania
January 6, 1986		at Wagner	L 75–79	4–7 (0–1)	Sutter Gymnasium (350); Staten Island, New York
January 8, 1986		St. Francis (NY)	L 53–54	4–8 (0–2)	McCann Recreation Center (2150); Poughkeepsie, New York
January 11, 1986*		Bucknell	W 61–53	5–8	McCann Recreation Center (1507); Poughkeepsie, New York
January 13, 1986		at Monmouth	W 86–75	6–8 (1–2)	William T. Boylan Gymnasium (1053); West Long Branch, New Jersey
January 16, 1986		Loyola (MD)	W 76–68	7–8 (2–2)	McCann Recreation Center (2082); Poughkeepsie, New York
January 20, 1986		at Long Island	W 80–73	8–8 (3–2)	Brooklyn Paramount Theater (829); Brooklyn, New York
January 23, 1986		at Saint Francis (PA)	W 72–54	9–8 (4–2)	DeGol Arena (1000); Loretto, Pennsylvania
January 25, 1986		at Robert Morris	L 68–74	9–9 (4–3)	Charles L. Sewall Center (1469); Moon Township, PA
January 29, 1986		at Fairleigh Dickinson	W 59–57	10–9 (5–3)	FDU Gym (1000); Hackensack, New Jersey
February 1, 1986		Wagner	L 81–85	10–10 (5–4)	McCann Recreation Center (2,701); Poughkeepsie, New York
February 8, 1986		Long Island	W 62–56	11–10 (6–4)	McCann Recreation Center (2408); Poughkeepsie, New York
February 12, 1986		at St. Francis (NY)	W 62–52	12–10 (7–4)	Pope Physical Education Center (512); Brooklyn, New York
February 15, 1986		Monmouth	W 55–51	13–10 (8–4)	McCann Recreation Center (2115); Poughkeepsie, New York
February 22, 1986		at Loyola (MD)	W 61–58	14–10 (9–4)	Reitz Arena (1096); Baltimore, Maryland
February 26, 1986		vs. Fairleigh Dickinson	L 57–76	14–11 (9–5)	Madison Square Garden (19591); New York, NY
February 28, 1986		Saint Francis (PA)	W 71–56	15–11 (10–5)	McCann Recreation Center (1728); Poughkeepsie, New York
March 1, 1986		Robert Morris	W 75–58	16–11 (11–5)	McCann Recreation Center (2302); Poughkeepsie, New York
ECAC Metro tournament
March 4, 1986	(2)	vs. (7) St. Francis (NY); Quarterfinals	W 83–64	17–11	Charles L. Sewall Center (1267); Moon Township, Pennsylvania
March 7, 1986	(2)	(6) Robert Morris; Semifinals	W 60–55	18–11	Charles L. Sewall Center (1200); Moon Township, Pennsylvania
March 8, 1986	(2)	vs. (1) Fairleigh Dickinson; Championship	W 57–56 ^{OT}	19–11	Charles L. Sewall Center (850); Moon Township, Pennsylvania
NCAA tournament
March 13, 1986*	(15 SE)	vs. (2 SE) No. 6 Georgia Tech; 1st round	L 53–68	19–12	Pete Maravich Assembly Center (10920); Baton Rouge, Louisiana
*Non-conference game. ^{#}Rankings from AP Poll. (#) Tournament seedings in parentheses. All times are in Eastern.
