= 1986 ECAC Metro men's basketball tournament =

- Classification: Division I
- Season: 1985–86
- Teams: 8
- Site: Charles L. Sewall Center; Moon Township, PA
- Champions: Marist (1st title)
- Winning coach: Matthew Furjanic Jr. (3rd title)
- MVP: Rik Smits (Marist)
- ECAC Metro men's basketball tournaments

1985–86 ECAC Metro men's basketball standings
	Conf.				Overall
Team	W		L	PCT	W		L	PCT
Fairleigh Dickinson	13	–	3	.813	22	–	8	.733
Marist†	11	–	5	.688	19	–	12	.613
Loyola (MD)	10	–	6	.625	16	–	12	.571
Wagner	10	–	6	.625	16	–	13	.552
Saint Francis (PA)	8	–	8	.500	10	–	18	.357
Robert Morris	6	–	10	.375	10	–	18	.357
Monmouth*	6	–	10	.375	9	–	19	.321
St. Francis (NY)	4	–	12	.250	9	–	19	.321
Long Island	4	–	12	.250	9	–	19	.321
† 1986 ECAC Metro tournament winner Rankings from AP Poll; *Ineligible for conference tournament

The 1986 ECAC Metro men's basketball tournament (now known as the Northeast Conference men's basketball tournament) was held March 4–6. All three rounds of the tournament were played at Charles L. Sewall Center in Moon Township, Pennsylvania.

Marist defeated Fairleigh Dickinson in the championship game, 57–56 in overtime, to win the school's first ECAC Metro men's basketball tournament title. The Red Foxes earned the automatic bid to the 1986 NCAA Tournament.

== Bracket ==
Quarterfinals; Sunday, March 4
1	Fairleigh Dickinson	86
8	Long Island	57
4	Wagner	100
5	St. Francis (PA)	83
3	Loyola (MD)	69
6	Robert Morris	75
2	Marist	83
7	St. Francis (NY)	64

Semifinals; Tuesday, March 5
1	Fairleigh Dickinson	81
4	Wagner	77
6	Robert Morris	55
2	Marist	60

Championship; Wednesday, March 6
1	Fairleigh Dickinson	56
2	Marist	57*
