= 1982 ECAC Metro men's basketball tournament =

- Classification: Division I
- Season: 1981–82
- Teams: 8
- Site: Campus sites
- Finals site: Schwartz Athletic Center; Brooklyn, NY
- Champions: Robert Morris (1st title)
- Winning coach: Matthew Furjanic Jr. (1st title)
- MVP: Tom Parks (Robert Morris)
- ECAC Metro men's basketball tournaments

1981–82 ECAC Metro men's basketball standings
| | Conf. | | | | Overall |
| Team | W | | L | PCT | W | | L | PCT |
|---|---|---|---|---|---|---|---|---|
North
| Fairleigh Dickinson | 12 | – | 3 | .800 | 16 | – | 11 | .593 |
| Long Island | 11 | – | 4 | .733 | 20 | – | 10 | .667 |
| Siena | 8 | – | 7 | .533 | 15 | – | 13 | .536 |
| St. Francis (NY) | 8 | – | 7 | .533 | 10 | – | 17 | .370 |
| Marist | 6 | – | 9 | .400 | 12 | – | 14 | .462 |
| Wagner | 1 | – | 14 | .067 | 4 | – | 22 | .154 |
South
| Robert Morris † | 9 | – | 5 | .643 | 17 | – | 13 | .567 |
| Baltimore | 8 | – | 6 | .571 | 15 | – | 13 | .536 |
| Towson State | 7 | – | 7 | .500 | 10 | – | 17 | .370 |
| Loyola (MD) | 7 | – | 7 | .500 | 11 | – | 16 | .407 |
| Saint Francis (PA) | 3 | – | 11 | .214 | 6 | – | 20 | .231 |
† 1982 ECAC Metro tournament winner Rankings from AP Poll

The 1982 ECAC Metro men's basketball tournament (now known as the Northeast Conference men's basketball tournament) was held March 5–7. The quarterfinal and semifinal rounds were played on campus sites with the championship game held at Schwartz Athletic Center in Brooklyn, New York.

Robert Morris defeated Long Island University in the championship game, 85–84, to win the first ECAC Metro men's basketball tournament. The Colonials earned the automatic bid to the 1982 NCAA tournament. This was the first NCAA tournament appearance for Robert Morris.

This was the first Tournament for the conference.

== Bracket ==
Quarterfinals; March 2
1N | Fairleigh Dickinson | 81
4N | Siena | 85
3N (Note: In the NEC record book, Marist is listed as playing against LIU in the opening round, yet according to the New York Times the game was played by St. Francis (NY) and LIU. Additionally, St. Francis (NY) finished ahead of Marist in the NEC North Division, further supporting the New York Times article.) | St. Francis (NY) | 53
2N | Long Island University | 56
1S | Robert Morris | 78
4S | Loyola (MD) | 69
3S | Towson State | 60
2S | Baltimore | 64

Semifinals; Saturday, March 6
4N | Siena | 84
2N | Long Island University | 94
1S | Robert Morris | 80
2S | Baltimore | 70

Championship; Sunday, March 7
2N | Long Island University | 84
1S | Robert Morris | 85
