= 1981–82 Robert Morris Colonials men's basketball team =

American college basketball season

1981–82 Robert Morris Colonials men's basketball

ECAC Metro South champions ECAC Metro tournament champions

NCAA tournament
- Conference: Eastern College Athletic Conference
- Record: 17–13 (9–5 ECAC Metro)
- Head coach: Matthew Furjanic Jr. (3rd season)
- Home arena: John Jay Center

1981–82 ECAC Metro men's basketball standings
| | Conf. | | | | Overall |
| Team | W | | L | PCT | W | | L | PCT |
|---|---|---|---|---|---|---|---|---|
North
| Fairleigh Dickinson | 12 | – | 3 | .800 | 16 | – | 11 | .593 |
| Long Island | 11 | – | 4 | .733 | 20 | – | 10 | .667 |
| Siena | 8 | – | 7 | .533 | 15 | – | 13 | .536 |
| St. Francis (NY) | 8 | – | 7 | .533 | 10 | – | 17 | .370 |
| Marist | 6 | – | 9 | .400 | 12 | – | 14 | .462 |
| Wagner | 1 | – | 14 | .067 | 4 | – | 22 | .154 |
South
| Robert Morris † | 9 | – | 5 | .643 | 17 | – | 13 | .567 |
| Baltimore | 8 | – | 6 | .571 | 15 | – | 13 | .536 |
| Towson State | 7 | – | 7 | .500 | 10 | – | 17 | .370 |
| Loyola (MD) | 7 | – | 7 | .500 | 11 | – | 16 | .407 |
| Saint Francis (PA) | 3 | – | 11 | .214 | 6 | – | 20 | .231 |
† 1982 ECAC Metro tournament winner Rankings from AP Poll

The 1981–82 Robert Morris Colonials men's basketball team represented Robert Morris University in the 1981–82 NCAA Division I basketball season. Robert Morris was coached by Matthew Furjanic Jr. and played their home games at the John Jay Center in Moon Township, PA. The Colonials were members of the ECAC Metro Conference. They finished the season 17–13, 9–5 in conference play. They won the ECAC Metro tournament to earn the conference's automatic bid to the 1982 NCAA Division I men's basketball tournament. They earned the 12 seed in the Mideast Region were beaten 94–62 by No. 5 seed and defending National champion Indiana in the first round.

== Roster ==
1981–82 Robert Morris Colonials men's basketball team
| Players | Coaches |
|---|---|
| Pos. / # / Name / Height / Weight / Year / Hometown; G / / Chipper Harris / 6 ft 1 in (1.85 m) / — / So / New Kensington, Pennsylvania | Head coach: Matthew Furjanic Jr.; Assistant coach(es) Legend: (C) Team captain; (S) Suspended; (I) Ineligible; (W) Walk-on; Injured; Current redshirt |

== Schedule and results ==
| Date time, TV | Rank^{#} | Opponent^{#} | Result | Record | Site (attendance) city, state |
Regular season
| Dec 19, 1981* | | at Pittsburgh | L 76–88 | 1–3 | Fitzgerald Field House; Pittsburgh, Pennsylvania |
| Jan 2, 1982* | | at No. 17 Georgetown | L 58–75 | 1–5 | Capital Centre; Landover, MD |
ECAC Metro tournament
| Mar 5, 1982* | | vs. Loyola (MD); Quarterfinals | W 78–69 | 15–12 | McCann Arena; Poughkeepsie, New York |
| Mar 6, 1982* | | vs. Baltimore; Semifinals | W 80–70 | 16–12 | McCann Arena; Poughkeepsie, New York |
| Mar 7, 1982* | | vs. Long Island University; Championship game | W 85–84 | 17–12 | McCann Arena; Poughkeepsie, New York |
NCAA tournament
| Mar 11, 1982* | (12 ME) | vs. (5 ME) Indiana; First round | L 62–94 | 17–13 | Memorial Gymnasium; Nashville, Tennessee |
*Non-conference game. ^{#}Rankings from AP Poll. (#) Tournament seedings in parentheses.
