= 1982–83 Robert Morris Colonials men's basketball team =

American college basketball season

1982–83 Robert Morris Colonials men's basketball

ECAC Metro South champions ECAC Metro tournament champions

NCAA tournament
- Conference: Eastern College Athletic Conference
- Record: 23–8 (12–2 ECAC Metro)
- Head coach: Matthew Furjanic Jr. (4th season)
- Home arena: John Jay Center

1982–83 ECAC Metro men's basketball standings
	Conf.				Overall
Team	W		L	PCT	W		L	PCT
North
Long Island	11	–	3	.786	20	–	9	.690
Fairleigh Dickinson	9	–	5	.643	17	–	12	.586
St. Francis (NY)	7	–	7	.500	10	–	18	.357
Marist	7	–	7	.500	14	–	15	.483
Siena	6	–	8	.429	12	–	16	.429
Wagner	2	–	12	.143	10	–	18	.357
South
Robert Morris †	12	–	2	.857	23	–	8	.742
Saint Francis (PA)	7	–	7	.500	12	–	17	.414
Baltimore	4	–	10	.286	10	–	18	.357
Loyola (MD)	3	–	11	.214	4	–	24	.143
† 1983 ECAC Metro tournament winner Rankings from AP Poll

The 1982–83 Robert Morris Colonials men's basketball team represented Robert Morris University in the 1982–83 NCAA Division I basketball season. Robert Morris was coached by Matthew Furjanic Jr. and played their home games at the John Jay Center in Moon Township, PA. The Colonials were members of the ECAC Metro Conference. They finished the season 23–8, 12–2 in conference play. They won the ECAC Metro tournament to earn the conference's automatic bid to the 1983 NCAA Division I men's basketball tournament. They earned one of two 12 seeds in the Mideast Region and defeated Georgia Southern in the play-in game, avenging an early season loss to the Eagles. The Colonials were then beaten 55–53 by Purdue in the first round.

== Roster ==
1982–83 Robert Morris Colonials men's basketball team
Players	Coaches
Pos. / # / Name / Height / Weight / Year / Hometown; G / / Chipper Harris / 6 ft 1 in (1.85 m) / — / Jr / New Kensington, Pennsylvania	Head coach: Matthew Furjanic Jr.; Assistant coach(es) Legend: (C) Team captain; (S) Suspended; (I) Ineligible; (W) Walk-on; Injured; Current redshirt

== Schedule and results ==
Date time, TV	Rank^{#}	Opponent^{#}	Result	Record	Site (attendance) city, state
Regular season
Dec 1, 1982*		at Providence	L 46–68	0–1	Providence Civic Center; Providence, Rhode Island
Dec 7, 1982*		vs. Drexel	W 62–58	2–1	(2,600)
Dec 11, 1982*		at Pittsburgh	L 80–95	2–2	Fitzgerald Field House; Pittsburgh, Pennsylvania
Dec 17, 1982*		vs. VCU	L 79–94	2–3	
Dec 18, 1982*		vs. Georgia Southern	L 63–66	2–4	
ECAC Metro tournament
Mar 9, 1983*		Loyola (MD)	W 81–60	20–7	John Jay Center
Mar 11, 1983*		Saint Francis (PA); Semifinals	W 106–94	21–7	John Jay Center
Mar 12, 1983*		at Long Island; Championship game	W 79–67	22–7	Schwartz Athletic Center
NCAA tournament
Mar 15, 1983*	(12 ME)	vs. (12 ME) Georgia Southern; Play-in game	W 64–54	23–7	University of Dayton Arena; Dayton, Ohio
Mar 17, 1983*	(12 ME)	vs. (5 ME) Purdue; First round	L 53–55	23–8	Sun Dome; Tampa, Florida
*Non-conference game. ^{#}Rankings from AP Poll. (#) Tournament seedings in parentheses.
