= 1995 NBA playoffs =

Postseason tournament

Tournament details
- Dates: April 27 – June 14, 1995
- Season: 1994–95
- Teams: 16

Final positions
- Champions: Houston Rockets (2nd title)
- Runners-up: Orlando Magic
- Semifinalists: Indiana Pacers; San Antonio Spurs

Tournament statistics
- Scoring leader(s): Hakeem Olajuwon (Rockets) (33.0 PPG)

Awards
- MVP: Hakeem Olajuwon (Rockets)

The 1995 NBA playoffs was the postseason tournament of the National Basketball Association's 1994–95 season. The tournament concluded with the Western Conference champion Houston Rockets sweeping the Eastern Conference champion Orlando Magic in the NBA Finals. Hakeem Olajuwon was named NBA Finals MVP for the second straight time.

As of 2026, the 1995 Rockets are the lowest-seeded team to win the NBA Championship.

Houston became the eighth team to win back-to-back titles (after the Minneapolis Lakers of 1949 and 1950, and again 1952–54, and the Celtics dynasty of 1959–66 and again in 1968–69, as the LA Lakers of 1987 and 1988, Pistons of 1989 and 1990 and Bulls of 1991, 1992 and 1993). It would go on to happen five more times, with the Bulls winning 3 more from 1996 to 1998, the Lakers from 2000 to 2002 and 2009–2010, the Miami Heat from 2012 to 2013, and the Golden State Warriors from 2017 to 2018. The Rockets championships were also part of a run that saw 4 teams win consecutive titles (The Lakers 1987–88, Pistons 1989–90, Bulls 1991–93 and 1996–98, Rockets 1994–95). That streak was stopped by a Spurs franchise, who like the Celtics of the 1980s, didn't win back-to-back titles, but did win numerous championships and are considered a dynasty.

The sixth-seeded Rockets (47–35) took out four impressive opponents on their way to the title, defeating the 3rd-seeded Utah Jazz (60–22), 2nd-seeded Phoenix Suns (59–23), top-seeded San Antonio Spurs (62–20) and Eastern Conference champion Orlando Magic (57–25) in the NBA Finals. In the first round against the Utah Jazz, the Houston Rockets came back from a 2-1 series deficit, winning Game 5 in Utah. In the second round against the Suns, the Rockets came back from 2–0 and 3–1 series deficits without home-court advantage, winning Games 5 and 7 in Phoenix. Additionally, the Rockets were the first road team to win a Game 7 of any round in the NBA playoffs in 13 years by beating the Suns at America West Arena (the next day, the Pacers became the second team to accomplish this feat since 1982, beating the Knicks at Madison Square Garden). Rockets center Hakeem Olajuwon dominated league MVP David Robinson and Shaquille O'Neal in consecutive series to win the title. The Rockets 47 wins were the fewest by an NBA champion since the Washington Bullets tallied 44 in 1978.

The 1995 Playoffs featured the first three playoff series victories in Magic history, as they beat the Boston Celtics, Chicago Bulls, and Indiana Pacers to win their first Eastern Conference title.

It also featured the return of Michael Jordan to the playoffs after a year and a half absence, returning in March, and the only time the Bulls didn't win a title with him on the roster since they started their string of consecutive titles in 1991.

Game 4 of the Celtics-Magic series was the last game played at Boston Garden. Boston returned to the playoffs in 2002, this time in the new FleetCenter (now TD Garden).

Game 3 of the Blazers-Suns series was the last game played at the then-Memorial Coliseum (renamed the Veterans Memorial Coliseum as of 2012). The Blazers continued their playoff streak at Rose Garden (now Moda Center) for the next 7 years.

Game 3 of the Spurs-Nuggets series was the final playoff game at McNichols Sports Arena; the Nuggets missed the playoffs in each of the arena's final four years. Denver returned to the playoffs in 2004, this time in the new Pepsi Center (now Ball Arena).

The Pacers made the Eastern Conference Finals for the second straight year (and finally defeated the New York Knicks on their way to doing so), but found the Magic too powerful to overcome. Coincidentally, they met all three playoff opponents (Orlando, Atlanta, and New York) they had in 1994, just in a different order.

Since the NBA playoffs expanded to 16 teams in 1984, the Jazz became the second team (along with the 1994 SuperSonics) to win at least 60 regular season games and lose in the first round, when they lost to the eventual NBA champion Rockets.

This marked the first time that every first and second round game of the playoffs was televised nationally. In previous years, a few early round games were not picked up by the NBA's national TV partners.

== Bracket ==
First Round	Conference Semifinals
E1	Orlando*	3
E8	Boston	1
E1	Orlando*	4
E5	Chicago	2
E4	Charlotte	1
E5	Chicago	3
Eastern Conference
E3	New York	3
E6	Cleveland	1
E3	New York	3
E2	Indiana*	4
E2	Indiana*	3
E7	Atlanta	0
W1	San Antonio*	3
W8	Denver	0
W1	San Antonio*	4
W5	LA Lakers	2
W4	Seattle	1
W5	LA Lakers	3
Western Conference
W3	Utah	2
W6	Houston	3
W6	Houston	4
W2	Phoenix*	3
W2	Phoenix*	3
W7	Portland	0

Conference Finals
E1	Orlando*	4
E2	Indiana*	3
W1	San Antonio*	2
W6	Houston	4

NBA Finals
E1	Orlando*	0
W6	Houston	4

- * Division winner
- Bold Series winner
- Italic Team with home-court advantage

== First round ==
=== Eastern Conference first round ===
==== (1) Orlando Magic vs. (8) Boston Celtics ====
TBS

April 28
7:00 PM

Boxscore

Boston Celtics 77, Orlando Magic 124
Scoring by quarter: 13–30, 23–24, 20–34, 21–36
Pts: Dee Brown 20; Rebs: Dominique Wilkins 9 Asts: Sherman Douglas 6	Pts: Shaquille O'Neal 23; Rebs: Horace Grant 14; Asts: Penny Hardaway 5
Orlando leads series, 1–0

Orlando Arena, Orlando, Florida
Attendance: 16,010
Referees: Dick Bavetta, Ken Mauer, Bennett Salvatore

NBC

April 30
12:30 PM

Boxscore

Boston Celtics 99, Orlando Magic 92
Scoring by quarter: 29–22, 18–25, 26–25, 26–20
Pts: Dominique Wilkins 24; Rebs: Brown, Radja 8 each Asts: Sherman Douglas 15	Pts: Penny Hardaway 26; Rebs: Horace Grant 14; Asts: Penny Hardaway 8
Series tied, 1–1

Orlando Arena, Orlando, Florida
Attendance: 16,010
Referees: Joe Crawford, Terry Durham, Bill Oakes

TNT

May 3
7:00 PM

Boxscore

Orlando Magic 82, Boston Celtics 77
Scoring by quarter: 19–24, 26–17, 21–22, 16–14
Pts: Nick Anderson 24; Rebs: Shaquille O'Neal 21; Asts: Penny Hardaway 8	Pts: Brown, Wilkins 16 each Rebs: Pervis Ellison 10; Asts: Sherman Douglas 7
Orlando leads series, 2–1

Boston Garden, Boston, Massachusetts
Attendance: 14,890
Referees: Nolan Fine, Jess Kersey, Eddie F. Rush

TNT

May 5
7:00 PM

Boxscore

Orlando Magic 95, Boston Celtics 92
Scoring by quarter: 24–19, 30–27, 19–26, 22–20
Pts: Shaquille O'Neal 25; Rebs: Shaquille O'Neal 13; Asts: Penny Hardaway 13	Pts: Dominique Wilkins 22; Rebs: Dominique Wilkins 18; Asts: Douglas, Brown 5 each
Orlando wins series, 3–1

Boston Garden, Boston, Massachusetts
Attendance: 14,890
Referees: Dan Crawford, Bob Delaney, Mike Mathis

- Game 4 was the last game at Boston Garden.

Regular-season series
Orlando won 3–2 in the regular-season series

November 25, 1994

Recap

Orlando Magic 124, Boston Celtics 118

Boston Garden, Boston

January 24, 1995

Recap

Boston Celtics 97, Orlando Magic 110

Orlando Arena, Orlando, Florida

February 23, 1995

Recap

Orlando Magic 117, Boston Celtics 119

Hartford Civic Center, Hartford, Connecticut

February 24, 1995

Recap

Boston Celtics 103, Orlando Magic 129

Orlando Arena, Orlando, Florida

April 13, 1995

Recap

Orlando Magic 114, Boston Celtics 119

Boston Garden, Boston

This was the first playoff meeting between the Celtics and the Magic.

==== (2) Indiana Pacers vs. (7) Atlanta Hawks ====
TNT

April 27
8:00 PM

Boxscore

Atlanta Hawks 82, Indiana Pacers 90
Scoring by quarter: 24–31, 23–13, 20–26, 15–20
Pts: Grant Long 18; Rebs: Grant Long 11; Asts: Mookie Blaylock 9	Pts: Reggie Miller 24; Rebs: Derrick McKey 9 Asts: Mark Jackson 9
Indiana leads series, 1–0

Market Square Arena, Indianapolis, Indiana
Attendance: 16,445
Referees: Hue Hollins, Jack Nies, Tommy Nunez Sr.

TNT

April 29
7:00 PM

Boxscore

Atlanta Hawks 97, Indiana Pacers 105
Scoring by quarter: 18–31, 25–28, 26–24, 28–22
Pts: Steve Smith 27; Rebs: Grant Long 13; Asts: Smith, Blaylock 3 each	Pts: Reggie Miller 39; Rebs: Rik Smits 11; Asts: Mark Jackson 7
Indiana leads series, 2–0

Market Square Arena, Indianapolis, Indiana
Attendance: 16,692
Referees: Dick Bavetta, Lee Jones, Bennett Salvatore

TNT

May 2
7:00 PM

Boxscore

Indiana Pacers 105, Atlanta Hawks 89
Scoring by quarter: 24–28, 27–24, 34–20, 20–17
Pts: Reggie Miller 32; Rebs: Rik Smits 14; Asts: Mark Jackson 7	Pts: Mookie Blaylock 20; Rebs: Grant Long 10; Asts: Mookie Blaylock 5
Indiana wins series, 3–0

Omni Coliseum, Atlanta, Georgia
Attendance: 12,106
Referees: Bob Delaney, Ron Garretson, Ed T. Rush

Regular-season series
Indiana won 4–1 in the regular-season series

November 4, 1994

Recap

Indiana Pacers 94, Atlanta Hawks 92

The Omni, Atlanta

December 14, 1994

Recap

Atlanta Hawks 79, Indiana Pacers 81

Market Square Arena, Indianapolis

January 20, 1995

Recap

Atlanta Hawks 89, Indiana Pacers 99

Market Square Arena, Indianapolis

April 7, 1995

Recap

Indiana Pacers 90, Atlanta Hawks 102

The Omni, Atlanta

April 23, 1995

Recap

Atlanta Hawks 87, Indiana Pacers 103

Market Square Arena, Indianapolis

This was the third playoff meeting between these two teams, with each team winning one series apiece.

Previous playoff series
Tied 1–1 in all-time playoff series

1987

Atlanta Hawks 3, Indiana Pacers 1

1987 Eastern Conference First Round

1994

Atlanta Hawks 2, Indiana Pacers 4

1994 Eastern Conference Semifinals

==== (3) New York Knicks vs. (6) Cleveland Cavaliers ====
TBS

April 27
7:00 PM

Boxscore

Cleveland Cavaliers 79, New York Knicks 103
Scoring by quarter: 24–27, 14–20, 18–29, 23–27
Pts: Danny Ferry 20; Rebs: Tyrone Hill 8 Asts: Mark Price 4	Pts: Patrick Ewing 21; Rebs: Charles Oakley 11; Asts: John Starks 7
New York leads series, 1–0

Madison Square Garden, New York City, New York
Attendance: 19,763
Referees: Joe Crawford, Paul Mihalak, Eddie F. Rush

NBC

April 29
1:00 PM

Boxscore

Cleveland Cavaliers 90, New York Knicks 84
Scoring by quarter: 21–18, 23–24, 22–19, 24–23
Pts: Mills, Phills 21 each Rebs: Hot Rod Williams 6 Asts: Mark Price 7	Pts: Ewing, Starks 21 each Rebs: Patrick Ewing 12; Asts: Charles Oakley 5
Series tied, 1–1

Madison Square Garden, New York City, New York
Attendance: 19,763
Referees: Hue Hollins, Jack Nies, Tommy Nunez Sr.

TNT

May 1
8:00 PM

Boxscore

New York Knicks 83, Cleveland Cavaliers 81
Scoring by quarter: 12–20, 25–18, 20–21, 26–22
Pts: Patrick Ewing 23; Rebs: Patrick Ewing 10; Asts: Derek Harper 5	Pts: Mark Price 21; Rebs: Michael Cage 8 Asts: Mark Price 6
New York leads series, 2–1

Gund Arena, Cleveland, Ohio
Attendance: 19,352
Referees: Dick Bavetta, Nolan Fine, Bennett Salvatore

TNT

May 4
6:00 PM

Boxscore

New York Knicks 93, Cleveland Cavaliers 80
Scoring by quarter: 27–17, 27–26, 24–19, 15–18
Pts: Derek Harper 30; Rebs: Patrick Ewing 13; Asts: Charles Oakley 8	Pts: Bobby Phills 20; Rebs: Hot Rod Williams 7 Asts: Mark Price 9
New York wins series, 3–1

Gund Arena, Cleveland, Ohio
Attendance: 18,575
Referees: Terry Durham, Steve Javie, Ed T. Rush

Regular-season series
Tied 2–2 in the regular-season series

December 22, 1994

Recap

Cleveland Cavaliers 93, New York Knicks 90

Madison Square Garden, New York City

January 6, 1995

Recap

New York Knicks 103, Cleveland Cavaliers 93

Gund Arena, Cleveland, Ohio

February 21, 1995

Recap

Cleveland Cavaliers 99, New York Knicks 91

Madison Square Garden, New York City

March 4, 1995

Recap

New York Knicks 89, Cleveland Cavaliers 76

Gund Arena, Cleveland, Ohio

This was the second playoff meeting between these two teams, with the Knicks winning the first meeting.

Previous playoff series
New York leads 1–0 in all-time playoff series

1978

Cleveland Cavaliers 0, New York Knicks 2

1978 Eastern Conference First Round

==== (4) Charlotte Hornets vs. (5) Chicago Bulls ====
TNT

April 28
8:00 PM

Boxscore

Chicago Bulls 108, Charlotte Hornets 100 (OT)
Scoring by quarter: 31–30, 20–19, 20–18, 21–25, Overtime: 16–8
Pts: Michael Jordan 48; Rebs: Michael Jordan 9 Asts: Toni Kukoč 9	Pts: Alonzo Mourning 32; Rebs: Alonzo Mourning 13; Asts: Muggsy Bogues 10
Chicago leads series, 1–0

Charlotte Coliseum, Charlotte, North Carolina
Attendance: 23,859
Referees: Joe DeRosa, Hugh Evans, Bill Oakes

NBC

April 30
5:30 PM

Boxscore

Chicago Bulls 89, Charlotte Hornets 106
Scoring by quarter: 28–25, 26–27, 20–27, 15–27
Pts: Michael Jordan 32; Rebs: Scottie Pippen 8 Asts: Michael Jordan 7	Pts: Larry Johnson 25; Rebs: Alonzo Mourning 20; Asts: Muggsy Bogues 7
Series tied, 1–1

Charlotte Coliseum, Charlotte, North Carolina
Referees: Bob Delaney, Ron Garretson, Ed T. Rush

TNT

May 2
8:00 PM

Boxscore

Charlotte Hornets 80, Chicago Bulls 103
Scoring by quarter: 22–24, 20–26, 18–34, 20–19
Pts: Larry Johnson 22; Rebs: Alonzo Mourning 7 Asts: four players 3 each	Pts: Michael Jordan 25; Rebs: Jordan, Perdue 6 each Asts: Scottie Pippen 9
Chicago leads series, 2–1

United Center, Chicago, Illinois
Attendance: 24,114
Referees: Terry Durham, Steve Javie, Mike Mathis

TNT

May 4
8:30 PM

Boxscore

Charlotte Hornets 84, Chicago Bulls 85
Scoring by quarter: 25–30, 19–24, 24–11, 16–20
Pts: Alonzo Mourning 20; Rebs: Alonzo Mourning 13; Asts: Wingate, Bogues 5 each	Pts: Jordan, Pippen 24 each Rebs: Toni Kukoč 11; Asts: Scottie Pippen 6
Chicago wins series, 3–1

United Center, Chicago, Illinois
Attendance: 24,221
Referees: Joe Crawford, Ronnie Nunn, Bennett Salvatore

Michael Jordan made the series winning free throws with 1:07 left

Regular-season series
Tied 2–2 in the regular-season series

November 4, 1994

Recap

Charlotte Hornets 83, Chicago Bulls 89

United Center, Chicago, Illinois

January 14, 1995

Recap

Chicago Bulls 85, Charlotte Hornets 96

Charlotte Coliseum, Charlotte, North Carolina

February 20, 1995

Recap

Chicago Bulls 104, Charlotte Hornets 115

Charlotte Coliseum, Charlotte, North Carolina

April 22, 1995

Recap

Charlotte Hornets 100, Chicago Bulls 116

United Center, Chicago, Illinois

This was the first playoff meeting between the Hornets and the Bulls.

=== Western Conference first round ===
==== (1) San Antonio Spurs vs. (8) Denver Nuggets ====
TBS

April 28
9:30 PM

Boxscore

Denver Nuggets 88, San Antonio Spurs 104
Scoring by quarter: 29–25, 14–23, 17–30, 28–26
Pts: Bryant Stith 16; Rebs: Bison Dele 12; Asts: three players 3 each	Pts: Sean Elliott 21; Rebs: Dennis Rodman 11; Asts: Avery Johnson 8
San Antonio leads series, 1–0

Alamodome, San Antonio, Texas
Attendance: 25,235
Referees: Joe Forte, Jake O'Donnell, Derrick Stafford

TNT

April 30
8:00 PM

Boxscore

Denver Nuggets 96, San Antonio Spurs 122
Scoring by quarter: 23–26, 16–34, 28–31, 29–31
Pts: Mahmoud Abdul-Rauf 21; Rebs: Dale Ellis 10; Asts: Jalen Rose 10	Pts: Robinson, Rodman 19 each Rebs: Dennis Rodman 16; Asts: Avery Johnson 9
San Antonio leads series, 2–0

Alamodome, San Antonio, Texas
Referees: Hugh Evans, Steve Javie, Don Vaden

TNT

May 2
9:30 PM

Boxscore

San Antonio Spurs 99, Denver Nuggets 95
Scoring by quarter: 27–24, 30–26, 24–21, 18–24
Pts: Robinson, Johnson 24 each Rebs: Dennis Rodman 13; Asts: David Robinson 5	Pts: Rogers, Smith 18 each Rebs: Rodney Rogers 9 Asts: Jalen Rose 7
San Antonio wins series, 3–0

McNichols Sports Arena, Denver, Colorado
Attendance: 17,171
Referees: Dan Crawford, Joe Crawford, Paul Mihalak

- Game 3 was the final playoff game at McNichols Sports Arena.

Regular-season series
San Antonio won 4–1 in the regular-season series

November 15, 1994

Recap

San Antonio Spurs 99, Denver Nuggets 112

McNichols Sports Arena, Denver, Colorado

December 21, 1994

Recap

San Antonio Spurs 111, Denver Nuggets 97

McNichols Sports Arena, Denver, Colorado

January 28, 1995

Recap

Denver Nuggets 77, San Antonio Spurs 103

Alamodome, San Antonio

April 16, 1995

Recap

San Antonio Spurs 112, Denver Nuggets 109

McNichols Sports Arena, Denver, Colorado

April 18, 1995

Recap

Denver Nuggets 96, San Antonio Spurs 107

Alamodome, San Antonio

This was the fourth playoff meeting between these two teams, with the Spurs winning two of the first three meetings.

Previous playoff series
San Antonio leads 2–1 in all-time playoff series

1983

Denver Nuggets 1, San Antonio Spurs 4

1983 Western Conference Semifinals

1985

Denver Nuggets 3, San Antonio Spurs 2

1985 Western Conference First Round

1990

Denver Nuggets 0, San Antonio Spurs 3

1990 Western Conference First Round

==== (2) Phoenix Suns vs. (7) Portland Trail Blazers ====
TNT

April 28
10:30 PM

Boxscore

Portland Trail Blazers 102, Phoenix Suns 129
Scoring by quarter: 31–30, 31–32, 16–30, 24–37
Pts: Rod Strickland 23; Rebs: Grant, Dudley 7 each Asts: Rod Strickland 13	Pts: Charles Barkley 29; Rebs: Charles Barkley 16; Asts: Kevin Johnson 10
Phoenix leads series, 1–0

America West Arena, Phoenix, Arizona
Attendance: 19,023
Referees: Steve Javie, Ed T. Rush, Greg Willard

NBC

April 30
3:00 PM

Boxscore

Portland Trail Blazers 94, Phoenix Suns 103
Scoring by quarter: 27–30, 30–23, 17–27, 20–23
Pts: Rod Strickland 26; Rebs: Buck Williams 7 Asts: Rod Strickland 12	Pts: Kevin Johnson 28; Rebs: A.C. Green 15; Asts: Kevin Johnson 6
Phoenix leads series, 2–0

America West Arena, Phoenix, Arizona
Referees: Joe Forte, Ed Middleton, Jake O'Donnell

TBS

May 2
10:30 PM

Boxscore

Phoenix Suns 117, Portland Trail Blazers 109
Scoring by quarter: 34–25, 29–29, 27–24, 27–31
Pts: Charles Barkley 47; Rebs: Charles Barkley 12; Asts: Kevin Johnson 11	Pts: Rod Strickland 21; Rebs: Clifford Robinson 10; Asts: Rod Strickland 12
Phoenix wins series, 3–0

Memorial Coliseum, Portland, Oregon
Attendance: 12,888
Referees: Hue Hollins, Bill Oakes, Don Vaden

- Game 3 was the Blazers' final game at Memorial Coliseum.

Regular-season series
Phoenix won 5–0 in the regular-season series

November 15, 1994

Recap

Phoenix Suns 96, Portland Trail Blazers 93

Memorial Coliseum, Portland, Oregon

November 18, 1994

Recap

Portland Trail Blazers 111, Phoenix Suns 124

America West Arena, Phoenix, Arizona

January 19, 1995

Recap

Phoenix Suns 122, Portland Trail Blazers 115

Memorial Coliseum, Portland, Oregon

February 15, 1995

Recap

Portland Trail Blazers 113, Phoenix Suns 120

America West Arena, Phoenix, Arizona

April 9, 1995

Recap

Phoenix Suns 104, Portland Trail Blazers 94

Memorial Coliseum, Portland, Oregon

This was the fifth playoff meeting between these two teams, with each team winning two series apiece.

Previous playoff series
Tied 2–2 in all-time playoff series

1979

Phoenix Suns 2, Portland Trail Blazers 1

1979 Western Conference First Round

1984

Phoenix Suns 3, Portland Trail Blazers 2

1984 Western Conference First Round

1990

Phoenix Suns 2, Portland Trail Blazers 4

1990 Western Conference Finals

1992

Phoenix Suns 1, Portland Trail Blazers 4

1992 Western Conference Semifinals

==== (3) Utah Jazz vs. (6) Houston Rockets ====
TBS

April 27
9:30 PM

Boxscore

Houston Rockets 100, Utah Jazz 102
Scoring by quarter: 22–19, 28–29, 23–22, 27–32
Pts: Hakeem Olajuwon 45; Rebs: Pete Chilcutt 9 Asts: Hakeem Olajuwon 6	Pts: John Stockton 28; Rebs: Karl Malone 14; Asts: John Stockton 10
Utah leads series, 1–0

Delta Center, Salt Lake City, Utah
Attendance: 19,911
Referees: Jim Clark, Dan Crawford, Mike Mathis

- John Stockton made the game-winning lay-up with 2.4 seconds left.

TNT

April 29
9:30 PM

Boxscore

Houston Rockets 140, Utah Jazz 126
Scoring by quarter: 39–32, 30–32, 39–21, 32–41
Pts: Kenny Smith 32; Rebs: Olajuwon, Horry 7 each Asts: Kenny Smith 9	Pts: Karl Malone 28; Rebs: Karl Malone 17; Asts: John Stockton 12
Series tied, 1–1

Delta Center, Salt Lake City, Utah
Attendance: 19,911
Referees: Bernie Fryer, Jess Kersey, Ronnie Nunn

TNT

May 3
9:30 PM

Boxscore

Utah Jazz 95, Houston Rockets 82
Scoring by quarter: 20–23, 26–18, 24–24, 25–17
Pts: Karl Malone 32; Rebs: Karl Malone 19; Asts: John Stockton 13	Pts: Hakeem Olajuwon 30; Rebs: Hakeem Olajuwon 10; Asts: Horry, Smith 5 each
Utah leads series, 2–1

The Summit, Houston, Texas
Attendance: 16,611
Referees: Joe Forte, Jake O'Donnell, Ron Olesiak

TNT

May 5
9:30 PM

Boxscore

Utah Jazz 106, Houston Rockets 123
Scoring by quarter: 27–32, 26–35, 25–32, 28–24
Pts: Karl Malone 31; Rebs: David Benoit 7 Asts: John Stockton 11	Pts: Clyde Drexler 41; Rebs: Clyde Drexler 9 Asts: Drexler, Smith 6 each
Series tied, 2–2

The Summit, Houston, Texas
Attendance: 16,611
Referees: Dick Bavetta, Ron Garretson, Jack Nies

NBC

May 7
3:00 PM

Boxscore

Houston Rockets 95, Utah Jazz 91
Scoring by quarter: 19–18, 23–26, 22–27, 31–20
Pts: Hakeem Olajuwon 33; Rebs: Olajuwon, Drexler 10 each Asts: Olajuwon, Cassell 4 each	Pts: Karl Malone 35; Rebs: Karl Malone 10; Asts: Jeff Hornacek 6
Houston wins series, 3–2

Delta Center, Salt Lake City, Utah
Attendance: 19,911
Referees: Hugh Evans, Hue Hollins, Steve Javie

Regular-season series
Utah won 3–2 in the regular-season series

December 30, 1994

Recap

Houston Rockets 111, Utah Jazz 103

Delta Center, Salt Lake City

February 2, 1995

Recap

Utah Jazz 101, Houston Rockets 121

The Summit, Houston, Texas

March 23, 1995

Recap

Utah Jazz 112, Houston Rockets 104

The Summit, Houston, Texas

April 19, 1995

Recap

Houston Rockets 96, Utah Jazz 115

Delta Center, Salt Lake City

April 23, 1995

Recap

Utah Jazz 103, Houston Rockets 97

The Summit, Houston, Texas

This was the third playoff meeting between these two teams, with each team winning one series apiece.

Previous playoff series
Tied 1–1 in all-time playoff series

1985

Houston Rockets 2, Utah Jazz 3

1985 Western Conference First Round

1994

Houston Rockets 4, Utah Jazz 1

1994 Western Conference Finals

==== (4) Seattle SuperSonics vs. (5) Los Angeles Lakers ====
TNT

April 27
10:30 PM

Boxscore

Los Angeles Lakers 71, Seattle SuperSonics 96
Scoring by quarter: 22–29, 20–21, 15–18, 14–28
Pts: Nick Van Exel 29; Rebs: Divac, Campbell 6 each Asts: four players 2 each	Pts: Shawn Kemp 21; Rebs: Kemp, Perkins 7 each Asts: Nate McMillan 8
Seattle leads series, 1–0

Tacoma Dome, Tacoma, Washington
Attendance: 14,073
Referees: Ron Garretson, Jess Kersey, Ed Middleton

NBC

April 29
3:30 PM

Boxscore

Los Angeles Lakers 84, Seattle SuperSonics 82
Scoring by quarter: 30–22, 13–14, 26–35, 15–11
Pts: Cedric Ceballos 25; Rebs: Vlade Divac 7 Asts: Vlade Divac 6	Pts: Shawn Kemp 22; Rebs: Shawn Kemp 12; Asts: Gary Payton 6
Series tied, 1–1

Tacoma Dome, Tacoma, Washington
Attendance: 14,681
Referees: Jim Clark, Dan Crawford, Mike Mathis

TNT

May 1
10:30 PM

Boxscore

Seattle SuperSonics 101, Los Angeles Lakers 105
Scoring by quarter: 22–34, 25–22, 25–25, 29–24
Pts: Shawn Kemp 30; Rebs: Shawn Kemp 11; Asts: Nate McMillan 10	Pts: Cedric Ceballos 24; Rebs: Vlade Divac 9 Asts: Van Exel, Ceballos 6 each
LA Lakers lead series, 2–1

Great Western Forum, Inglewood, California
Attendance: 17,505
Referees: Bernie Fryer, Hue Hollins, Ronnie Nunn

TNT

May 4
11:00 PM

Boxscore

Seattle SuperSonics 110, Los Angeles Lakers 114
Scoring by quarter: 35–26, 24–29, 31–27, 20–32
Pts: Gary Payton 27; Rebs: Shawn Kemp 18; Asts: three players 6 each	Pts: Nick Van Exel 34; Rebs: Vlade Divac 11; Asts: Nick Van Exel 9
LA Lakers win series, 3–1

Great Western Forum, Inglewood, California
Attendance: 17,505
Referees: Hugh Evans, Paul Mihalak, Bill Oakes

- In Game 2, with 4:11 remaining in the 4th quarter, a power surge caused the main lights in the stadium to fail causing a 24 minute delay.

Regular-season series
Los Angeles won 4–1 in the regular-season series

December 29, 1994

Recap

Seattle SuperSonics 95, Los Angeles Lakers 96

Great Western Forum, Inglewood, California

January 28, 1995

Recap

Los Angeles Lakers 128, Seattle SuperSonics 121

Tacoma Dome, Tacoma, Washington

February 15, 1995

Recap

Seattle SuperSonics 96, Los Angeles Lakers 102

Great Western Forum, Inglewood, California

February 20, 1995

Recap

Los Angeles Lakers 108, Seattle SuperSonics 105

Tacoma Dome, Tacoma, Washington

April 18, 1995

Recap

Seattle SuperSonics 113, Los Angeles Lakers 97

Great Western Forum, Inglewood, California

This was the sixth playoff meeting between these two teams, with the Lakers winning three of the first five meetings.

Previous playoff series
Los Angeles leads 3–2 in all-time playoff series

1978

Los Angeles Lakers 1, Seattle SuperSonics 2

1978 Western Conference First Round

1979

Los Angeles Lakers 1, Seattle SuperSonics 4

1979 Western Conference Semifinals

1980

Los Angeles Lakers 4, Seattle SuperSonics 1

1980 Western Conference Finals

1987

Los Angeles Lakers 4, Seattle SuperSonics 0

1987 Western Conference Finals

1989

Los Angeles Lakers 4, Seattle SuperSonics 0

1989 Western Conference Semifinals

== Conference semifinals ==
=== Eastern Conference semifinals ===
==== (1) Orlando Magic vs. (5) Chicago Bulls ====
NBC

May 7
5:30 PM

Boxscore

Chicago Bulls 91, Orlando Magic 94
Scoring by quarter: 19–22, 24–21, 22–26, 26–25
Pts: Michael Jordan 19; Rebs: Scottie Pippen 10; Asts: Jordan, Pippen 7 each	Pts: Shaquille O'Neal 26; Rebs: Shaquille O'Neal 12; Asts: Hardaway, Shaw 6 each
Orlando leads series, 1–0

Orlando Arena, Orlando, Florida
Attendance: 16,010
Referees: Jack Nies, Jake O'Donnell, Don Vaden

- Nick Anderson's clutch steal off Michael Jordan led to his comments on Jordan's jersey number 45, saying he thought Jordan was playing like a 45-year-old. Meanwhile, Horace Grant went up for the game-winning dunk with 6.2 seconds remaining.

TNT

May 10
8:00 PM

Boxscore

Chicago Bulls 104, Orlando Magic 94
Scoring by quarter: 21–20, 28–28, 31–23, 24–23
Pts: Michael Jordan 38; Rebs: Kukoč, Perdue 8 each Asts: Scottie Pippen 5	Pts: Shaquille O'Neal 25; Rebs: Horace Grant 15; Asts: Penny Hardaway 7
Series tied, 1–1

Orlando Arena, Orlando, Florida
Attendance: 16,010
Referees: Dick Bavetta, Paul Mihalak, Bill Oakes

- Jordan returned to his more familiar jersey number 23.

TNT

May 12
8:00 PM

Boxscore

Orlando Magic 110, Chicago Bulls 101
Scoring by quarter: 32–37, 33–24, 15–20, 30–20
Pts: Shaquille O'Neal 28; Rebs: Horace Grant 14; Asts: Penny Hardaway 8	Pts: Michael Jordan 40; Rebs: Scottie Pippen 12; Asts: Toni Kukoč 7
Orlando leads series, 2–1

United Center, Chicago, Illinois
Attendance: 24,281
Referees: Hugh Evans, Bernie Fryer, Steve Javie

NBC

May 14
5:30 PM

Boxscore

Orlando Magic 95, Chicago Bulls 106
Scoring by quarter: 20–34, 28–25, 24–21, 23–26
Pts: Horace Grant 21; Rebs: Horace Grant 13; Asts: Shaquille O'Neal 9	Pts: Michael Jordan 26; Rebs: Jordan, Pippen 7 each Asts: Toni Kukoč 9
Series tied, 2–2

United Center, Chicago, Illinois
Attendance: 24,358
Referees: Joe Crawford, Joe Forte, Ed Middleton

TNT

May 16
6:00 PM

Boxscore

Chicago Bulls 95, Orlando Magic 103
Scoring by quarter: 29–25, 21–18, 20–35, 25–25
Pts: Michael Jordan 39; Rebs: Scottie Pippen 11; Asts: Toni Kukoč 6	Pts: Horace Grant 24; Rebs: Shaquille O'Neal 22; Asts: Penny Hardaway 11
Orlando leads series, 3–2

Orlando Arena, Orlando, Florida
Attendance: 16,010
Referees: Dan Crawford, Bob Delaney, Ed T. Rush

TBS

May 18
7:00 PM

Boxscore

Orlando Magic 108, Chicago Bulls 102
Scoring by quarter: 31–36, 32–25, 22–22, 23–19
Pts: Shaquille O'Neal 27; Rebs: Shaquille O'Neal 13; Asts: Penny Hardaway 7	Pts: Scottie Pippen 26; Rebs: Scottie Pippen 12; Asts: Michael Jordan 7
Orlando wins series, 4–2

United Center, Chicago, Illinois
Attendance: 24,322
Referees: Jess Kersey, Mike Mathis, Ronnie Nunn

Regular-season series
Orlando won 3–1 in the regular-season series

January 10, 1995

Recap

Orlando Magic 77, Chicago Bulls 109

United Center, Chicago, Illinois

January 26, 1995

Recap

Chicago Bulls 99, Orlando Magic 102

Orlando Arena, Orlando, Florida

February 26, 1995

Recap

Chicago Bulls 103, Orlando Magic 105

Orlando Arena, Orlando, Florida

March 24, 1995

Recap

Orlando Magic 106, Chicago Bulls 99

United Center, Chicago, Illinois

This was the first playoff meeting between the Bulls and the Magic.

==== (2) Indiana Pacers vs. (3) New York Knicks ====
NBC

May 7
12:30 PM

Boxscore

Indiana Pacers 107, New York Knicks 105
Scoring by quarter: 29–27, 25–32, 26–18, 27–28
Pts: Rik Smits 34; Rebs: Dale Davis 13; Asts: Mark Jackson 7	Pts: John Starks 21; Rebs: Oakley, Ewing 10 each Asts: John Starks 7
Indiana leads series, 1–0

Madison Square Garden, New York City, New York
Attendance: 19,763
Referees: Joe Crawford, Bill Oakes, Eddie F. Rush

- Reggie Miller scored 8 points in 8.9 seconds, including 2 straight 3's in 5.5 seconds, to rally from a 105–99 deficit.

TNT

May 9
8:00 PM

Boxscore

Indiana Pacers 77, New York Knicks 96
Scoring by quarter: 23–28, 27–20, 13–30, 14–18
Pts: Dale Davis 13; Rebs: Dale Davis 9 Asts: Jackson, Workman 4 each	Pts: Derek Harper 24; Rebs: Anthony Mason 8 Asts: Derek Harper 8
Series tied, 1–1

Madison Square Garden, New York City, New York
Attendance: 19,763
Referees: Bernie Fryer, Steve Javie, Mike Mathis

TNT

May 11
8:00 PM

Boxscore

New York Knicks 95, Indiana Pacers 97 (OT)
Scoring by quarter: 29–24, 20–21, 24–20, 15–23, Overtime: 7–9
Pts: Oakley, Starks 23 each Rebs: Charles Oakley 7 Asts: John Starks 9	Pts: Reggie Miller 26; Rebs: Reggie Miller 11; Asts: Mark Jackson 4
Indiana leads series, 2–1

Market Square Arena, Indianapolis, Indiana
Attendance: 16,675
Referees: Dan Crawford, Bob Delaney, Ed T. Rush

- Rik Smits hit the game-tying jumper with 34 seconds left to force OT.

NBC

May 13
3:30 PM

Boxscore

New York Knicks 84, Indiana Pacers 98
Scoring by quarter: 21–24, 23–19, 17–34, 23–21
Pts: Patrick Ewing 25; Rebs: Charles Oakley 10; Asts: Derek Harper 10	Pts: Rik Smits 25; Rebs: Rik Smits 11; Asts: Mark Jackson 11
Indiana leads series, 3–1

Market Square Arena, Indianapolis, Indiana
Attendance: 16,678
Referees: Ron Garretson, Hue Hollins, Tommy Nunez Sr.

TNT

May 17
8:00 PM

Boxscore

Indiana Pacers 95, New York Knicks 96
Scoring by quarter: 28–34, 22–19, 24–17, 21–26
Pts: Rik Smits 28; Rebs: Antonio Davis 9 Asts: Reggie Miller 6	Pts: Patrick Ewing 19; Rebs: Charles Oakley 13; Asts: John Starks 7
Indiana leads series, 3–2

Madison Square Garden, New York City, New York
Attendance: 19,763
Referees: Hugh Evans, Ed Middleton, Bennett Salvatore

- Patrick Ewing hit the game-winner with 1.8 seconds left.

TNT

May 19
8:00 PM

Boxscore

New York Knicks 92, Indiana Pacers 82
Scoring by quarter: 24–21, 18–22, 27–13, 23–26
Pts: Patrick Ewing 25; Rebs: Patrick Ewing 15; Asts: Derek Harper 7	Pts: Rik Smits 21; Rebs: Antonio Davis 8 Asts: Derrick McKey 6
Series tied, 3–3

Market Square Arena, Indianapolis, Indiana
Attendance: 16,679
Referees: Dick Bavetta, Joe Crawford, Jack Nies

NBC

May 21
3:30 PM

Boxscore

Indiana Pacers 97, New York Knicks 95
Scoring by quarter: 34–28, 22–24, 25–24, 16–19
Pts: Reggie Miller 29; Rebs: Mark Jackson 8 Asts: Mark Jackson 8	Pts: Patrick Ewing 29; Rebs: Patrick Ewing 14; Asts: Harper, Oakley 6 each
Indiana wins series, 4–3

Madison Square Garden, New York City, New York
Attendance: 19,763
Referees: Steve Javie, Jess Kersey, Ed T. Rush

- Ewing missed the game tying lay-up at the buzzer; the Pacers became the 4th NBA road team to win Game 7 after leading series 3–1.

Regular-season series
New York won 3–1 in the regular-season series

January 10, 1995

Recap

Indiana Pacers 105, New York Knicks 117

Madison Square Garden, New York City

February 8, 1995

Recap

New York Knicks 96, Indiana Pacers 77

Market Square Arena, Indianapolis

April 4, 1995

Recap

Indiana Pacers 94, New York Knicks 90

Madison Square Garden, New York City

April 14, 1995

Recap

New York Knicks 88, Indiana Pacers 84

Market Square Arena, Indianapolis

This was the third playoff meeting between these two teams, with the Knicks winning the first two meetings.

Previous playoff series
New York leads 2–0 in all-time playoff series

1993

Indiana Pacers 1, New York Knicks 3

1993 Eastern Conference First Round

1994

Indiana Pacers 3, New York Knicks 4

1994 Eastern Conference Finals

=== Western Conference semifinals ===
==== (1) San Antonio Spurs vs. (5) Los Angeles Lakers ====
May 6

Boxscore

Los Angeles Lakers 94, San Antonio Spurs 110
Scoring by quarter: 30–30, 18–28, 25–22, 21–30
Pts: Elden Campbell 29; Rebs: Vlade Divac 11; Asts: Nick Van Exel 12	Pts: David Robinson 33; Rebs: Dennis Rodman 12; Asts: Avery Johnson 12
San Antonio leads series, 1–0

Alamodome, San Antonio, Texas
Attendance: 24,002
Referees: Ed T. Rush, Bennett Salvatore, Greg Willard

May 8

Boxscore

Los Angeles Lakers 90, San Antonio Spurs 97 (OT)
Scoring by quarter: 20–26, 20–23, 20–14, 23–20, Overtime: 7–14
Pts: Elden Campbell 25; Rebs: Elden Campbell 18; Asts: Nick Van Exel 10	Pts: Robinson, Rodman 22 each Rebs: Dennis Rodman 22; Asts: Avery Johnson 9
San Antonio leads series, 2–0

Alamodome, San Antonio, Texas
Attendance: 26,127
Referees: Ron Garretson, Jess Kersey, Ed Middleton

May 12

Boxscore

San Antonio Spurs 85, Los Angeles Lakers 92
Scoring by quarter: 11–28, 32–25, 22–23, 20–16
Pts: David Robinson 34; Rebs: David Robinson 13; Asts: Avery Johnson 8	Pts: Nick Van Exel 25; Rebs: Vlade Divac 13; Asts: Nick Van Exel 8
San Antonio leads series, 2–1

Great Western Forum, Inglewood, California
Attendance: 17,505
Referees: Mike Mathis, Jack Nies, Don Vaden

May 14

Boxscore

San Antonio Spurs 80, Los Angeles Lakers 71
Scoring by quarter: 27–17, 19–22, 15–12, 19–20
Pts: David Robinson 26; Rebs: David Robinson 22; Asts: Avery Johnson 7	Pts: Vlade Divac 14; Rebs: George Lynch 8 Asts: Van Exel, Peeler 5 each
San Antonio leads series, 3–1

Great Western Forum, Inglewood, California
Attendance: 17,505
Referees: Hugh Evans, Bill Oakes, Eddie F. Rush

May 16

Boxscore

Los Angeles Lakers 98, San Antonio Spurs 96 (OT)
Scoring by quarter: 29–24, 26–25, 21–20, 12–19, Overtime: 10–8
Pts: Nick Van Exel 22; Rebs: Vlade Divac 15; Asts: Nick Van Exel 7	Pts: David Robinson 34; Rebs: David Robinson 17; Asts: Avery Johnson 12
San Antonio leads series, 3–2

Alamodome, San Antonio, Texas
Attendance: 35,888
Referees: Mike Mathis, Bill Oakes, Eddie F. Rush

- Nick Van Exel hit the game-tying 3 with 10.2 seconds left in regulation, then the game-winning 3 with 5 tenths left in OT.

May 18

Boxscore

San Antonio Spurs 100, Los Angeles Lakers 88
Scoring by quarter: 24–18, 23–26, 32–24, 21–20
Pts: David Robinson 31; Rebs: David Robinson 15; Asts: Avery Johnson 11	Pts: Elden Campbell 21; Rebs: Elden Campbell 8 Asts: Nick Van Exel 11
San Antonio wins series, 4–2

Great Western Forum, Inglewood, California
Attendance: 17,505
Referees: Dan Crawford, Bernie Fryer, Hue Hollins

Regular-season series
San Antonio won 3–1 in the regular-season series

December 17, 1994

Recap

Los Angeles Lakers 102, San Antonio Spurs 116

Alamodome, San Antonio

February 8, 1995

Recap

San Antonio Spurs 99, Los Angeles Lakers 115

Great Western Forum, Inglewood, California

March 29, 1995

Recap

Los Angeles Lakers 84, San Antonio Spurs 107

Alamodome, San Antonio

April 9, 1995

Recap

San Antonio Spurs 101, Los Angeles Lakers 87

Great Western Forum, Inglewood, California

This was the fifth playoff meeting between these two teams, with the Lakers winning the first four meetings.

Previous playoff series
Los Angeles leads 4–0 in all-time playoff series

1982

Los Angeles Lakers 4, San Antonio Spurs 0

1982 Western Conference Finals

1983

Los Angeles Lakers 4, San Antonio Spurs 2

1983 Western Conference Finals

1986

Los Angeles Lakers 3, San Antonio Spurs 0

1986 Western Conference First Round

1988

Los Angeles Lakers 3, San Antonio Spurs 0

1988 Western Conference First Round

==== (2) Phoenix Suns vs. (6) Houston Rockets ====
May 9

Boxscore

Houston Rockets 108, Phoenix Suns 130
Scoring by quarter: 30–32, 27–43, 24–31, 27–24
Pts: Hakeem Olajuwon 18; Rebs: Chucky Brown 6 Asts: Kenny Smith 10	Pts: Charles Barkley 26; Rebs: A.C. Green 15; Asts: Kevin Johnson 13
Phoenix leads series, 1–0

America West Arena, Phoenix, Arizona
Attendance: 19,023
Referees: Joe Forte, Tommy Nunez Sr., Jake O'Donnell

May 11

Boxscore

Houston Rockets 94, Phoenix Suns 118
Scoring by quarter: 19–35, 21–26, 30–25, 24–32
Pts: Hakeem Olajuwon 25; Rebs: Robert Horry 8 Asts: Clyde Drexler 7	Pts: Charles Barkley 30; Rebs: A.C. Green 14; Asts: Kevin Johnson 12
Phoenix leads series, 2–0

America West Arena, Phoenix, Arizona
Attendance: 19,023
Referees: Joe Crawford, Terry Durham, Ronnie Nunn

May 13

Boxscore

Phoenix Suns 85, Houston Rockets 118
Scoring by quarter: 21–29, 19–33, 18–25, 27–31
Pts: Kevin Johnson 14; Rebs: A.C. Green 9 Asts: three players 4 each	Pts: Hakeem Olajuwon 36; Rebs: Hakeem Olajuwon 11; Asts: Clyde Drexler 8
Phoenix leads series, 2–1

The Summit, Houston, Texas
Attendance: 16,611
Referees: Jess Kersey, Bennett Salvatore, Greg Willard

May 14

Boxscore

Phoenix Suns 114, Houston Rockets 110
Scoring by quarter: 24–28, 30–36, 37–24, 23–22
Pts: Kevin Johnson 43; Rebs: A.C. Green 12; Asts: Kevin Johnson 9	Pts: Hakeem Olajuwon 38; Rebs: Robert Horry 17; Asts: Sam Cassell 9
Phoenix leads series, 3–1

The Summit, Houston, Texas
Attendance: 16,611
Referees: Dick Bavetta, Dan Crawford, Paul Mihalak

May 16

Boxscore

Houston Rockets 103, Phoenix Suns 97 (OT)
Scoring by quarter: 28–24, 21–27, 27–28, 16–13, Overtime: 11–5
Pts: Hakeem Olajuwon 31; Rebs: Hakeem Olajuwon 16; Asts: Kenny Smith 7	Pts: Kevin Johnson 28; Rebs: A.C. Green 20; Asts: Kevin Johnson 8
Phoenix leads series, 3–2

America West Arena, Phoenix, Arizona
Attendance: 19,023
Referees: Dick Bavetta, Terry Durham, Steve Javie

With 8.2 seconds left, Hakeem Olajuwon's fadeaway jumper tied the game at 92 to force overtime.

May 18

Boxscore

Phoenix Suns 103, Houston Rockets 116
Scoring by quarter: 30–33, 28–22, 26–32, 19–29
Pts: Charles Barkley 34; Rebs: Charles Barkley 14; Asts: Kevin Johnson 10	Pts: Hakeem Olajuwon 30; Rebs: Olajuwon, Drexler 8 each Asts: Hakeem Olajuwon 10
Series tied, 3–3

The Summit, Houston, Texas
Attendance: 16,661
Referees: Ron Garretson, Steve Javie, Ed T. Rush

May 20

Boxscore

Houston Rockets 115, Phoenix Suns 114
Scoring by quarter: 13–26, 28–25, 40–28, 34–35
Pts: Olajuwon, Drexler 29 each Rebs: Hakeem Olajuwon 11; Asts: Sam Cassell 7	Pts: Kevin Johnson 46; Rebs: Charles Barkley 23; Asts: Kevin Johnson 10
Houston wins series, 4–3

America West Arena, Phoenix, Arizona
Attendance: 19,023
Referees: Hugh Evans, Hue Hollins, Bennett Salvatore

- After Mario Elie's game-winning "Kiss of Death" three-pointer with 7.1 seconds left, the Rockets became the 5th team in NBA history to overcome a 3–1 series deficit. The Rockets would also overcome a 3–1 deficit 20 years later against the Los Angeles Clippers.

Regular-season series
Houston won 3–1 in the regular-season series

December 22, 1994

Recap

Phoenix Suns 106, Houston Rockets 114

The Summit, Houston, Texas

February 5, 1995

Recap

Houston Rockets 124, Phoenix Suns 100

America West Arena, Phoenix, Arizona

March 7, 1995

Recap

Phoenix Suns 113, Houston Rockets 102

The Summit, Houston, Texas

March 24, 1995

Recap

Houston Rockets 99, Phoenix Suns 97

America West Arena, Phoenix, Arizona

This was the second playoff meeting between these two teams, with the Rockets winning the first meeting.

Previous playoff series
Houston leads 1–0 in all-time playoff series

1994

Houston Rockets 4, Phoenix Suns 3

1994 Western Conference Semifinals

== Conference finals ==
=== Eastern Conference finals ===
==== (1) Orlando Magic vs. (2) Indiana Pacers ====
TNT

May 23
8:00 PM

Boxscore

Indiana Pacers 101, Orlando Magic 105
Scoring by quarter: 27–23, 26–25, 21–35, 27–22
Pts: Reggie Miller 26; Rebs: Dale Davis 8 Asts: Mark Jackson 7	Pts: Shaquille O'Neal 32; Rebs: Horace Grant 12; Asts: Penny Hardaway 14
Orlando leads series, 1–0

Orlando Arena, Orlando, Florida
Attendance: 16,010
Referees: Dan Crawford, Hugh Evans, Ron Garretson

TNT

May 25
8:00 PM

Boxscore

Indiana Pacers 114, Orlando Magic 119
Scoring by quarter: 23–34, 29–27, 31–28, 31–30
Pts: Reggie Miller 37; Rebs: Dale Davis 13; Asts: Rik Smits 6	Pts: Shaquille O'Neal 39; Rebs: Horace Grant 12; Asts: Penny Hardaway 15
Orlando leads series, 2–0

Orlando Arena, Orlando, Florida
Attendance: 16,010
Referees: Jess Kersey, Paul Mihalak, Bennett Salvatore

NBC

May 27
3:30 PM

Boxscore

Orlando Magic 100, Indiana Pacers 105
Scoring by quarter: 23–29, 33–26, 24–27, 20–23
Pts: Penny Hardaway 29; Rebs: Jeff Turner 7 Asts: three players 4 each	Pts: Reggie Miller 26; Rebs: Antonio Davis 10; Asts: Mark Jackson 13
Orlando leads series, 2–1

Market Square Arena, Indianapolis, Indiana
Attendance: 16,477
Referees: Hue Hollins, Bill Oakes, Eddie F. Rush

NBC

May 29
3:30 PM

Boxscore

Orlando Magic 93, Indiana Pacers 94
Scoring by quarter: 26–26, 21–27, 24–22, 22–19
Pts: Penny Hardaway 26; Rebs: Horace Grant 12; Asts: Brian Shaw 5	Pts: Reggie Miller 23; Rebs: Jackson, Smits 7 each Asts: Rik Smits 7
Series tied, 2–2

Market Square Arena, Indianapolis, Indiana
Attendance: 16,477
Referees: Steve Javie, Mike Mathis, Jack Nies

- Four straight go-ahead shots to end the game: 1st, Brian Shaw's 3 with 13.3 seconds left; 2nd, Reggie Miller's 3 with 5.2 seconds left; 3rd, Penny Hardaway's 3 with 1.3 seconds left; finally, Rik Smits' buzzer-beating 2.

NBC

May 31
9:00 PM

Boxscore

Indiana Pacers 106, Orlando Magic 108
Scoring by quarter: 32–26, 18–32, 22–25, 34–25
Pts: Miller, McKey 21 each Rebs: Derrick McKey 9 Asts: Mark Jackson 11	Pts: Shaquille O'Neal 35; Rebs: Shaquille O'Neal 13; Asts: Penny Hardaway 8
Orlando leads series, 3–2

Orlando Arena, Orlando, Florida
Attendance: 16,010
Referees: Dick Bavetta, Joe Crawford, Ed Middleton

NBC

June 2
9:00 PM

Boxscore

Orlando Magic 96, Indiana Pacers 123
Scoring by quarter: 20–31, 20–34, 22–29, 34–29
Pts: Shaquille O'Neal 26; Rebs: Horace Grant 9 Asts: Nick Anderson 5	Pts: Reggie Miller 36; Rebs: Smits, D. Davis 10 each Asts: Mark Jackson 12
Series tied, 3–3

Market Square Arena, Indianapolis, Indiana
Attendance: 16,477
Referees: Dan Crawford, Ron Garretson, Ed T. Rush

NBC

June 4
7:00 PM

Boxscore

Indiana Pacers 81, Orlando Magic 105
Scoring by quarter: 24–27, 21–25, 18–28, 18–25
Pts: Dale Davis 15; Rebs: Dale Davis 14; Asts: Mark Jackson 5	Pts: Shaquille O'Neal 25; Rebs: Shaquille O'Neal 11; Asts: Nick Anderson 7
Orlando wins series, 4–3

Orlando Arena, Orlando, Florida
Attendance: 16,010
Referees: Hugh Evans, Jess Kersey, Mike Mathis

Regular-season series
Tied 2–2 in the regular-season series

February 3, 1995

Recap

Orlando Magic 106, Indiana Pacers 118

Market Square Arena, Indianapolis

February 14, 1995

Recap

Indiana Pacers 92, Orlando Magic 111

Orlando Arena, Orlando, Florida

March 17, 1995

Recap

Orlando Magic 97, Indiana Pacers 107

Market Square Arena, Indianapolis

April 21, 1995

Recap

Indiana Pacers 86, Orlando Magic 110

Orlando Arena, Orlando, Florida

This was the second playoff meeting between these two teams, with the Pacers winning the first meeting.

Previous playoff series
Indiana leads 1–0 in all-time playoff series

1994

Indiana Pacers 3, Orlando Magic 0

1994 Eastern Conference First Round

=== Western Conference finals ===
==== (1) San Antonio Spurs vs. (6) Houston Rockets ====
TNT

May 22
9:00 PM

Boxscore

Houston Rockets 94, San Antonio Spurs 93
Scoring by quarter: 26–23, 26–30, 22–15, 20–25
Pts: Hakeem Olajuwon 27; Rebs: Clyde Drexler 12; Asts: Hakeem Olajuwon 6	Pts: Sean Elliott 24; Rebs: Dennis Rodman 20; Asts: Avery Johnson 9
Houston leads series, 1–0

Alamodome, San Antonio, Texas
Attendance: 33,337
Referees: Mike Mathis, Bill Oakes, Eddie F. Rush

- Robert Horry hits the game-winner with 6.5 seconds left.

TNT

May 24
9:00 PM

Boxscore

Houston Rockets 106, San Antonio Spurs 96
Scoring by quarter: 21–16, 28–25, 25–27, 32–28
Pts: Hakeem Olajuwon 41; Rebs: Hakeem Olajuwon 16; Asts: Elie, Cassell 7 each	Pts: David Robinson 32; Rebs: David Robinson 12; Asts: Elliott, Anderson 5 each
Houston leads series, 2–0

Alamodome, San Antonio, Texas
Attendance: 35,888
Referees: Joe Crawford, Jack Nies, Ronnie Nunn

TNT

May 26
9:00 PM

Boxscore

San Antonio Spurs 107, Houston Rockets 102
Scoring by quarter: 31–37, 21–24, 27–19, 28–22
Pts: David Robinson 29; Rebs: Dennis Rodman 14; Asts: Avery Johnson 13	Pts: Hakeem Olajuwon 43; Rebs: Hakeem Olajuwon 11; Asts: Clyde Drexler 9
Houston leads series, 2–1

The Summit, Houston, Texas
Attendance: 16,611
Referees: Dick Bavetta, Steve Javie, Ed Middleton

NBC

May 28
3:30 PM

Boxscore

San Antonio Spurs 103, Houston Rockets 81
Scoring by quarter: 26–22, 28–23, 24–13, 25–23
Pts: David Robinson 20; Rebs: Dennis Rodman 19; Asts: Johnson, Del Negro 4 each	Pts: Hakeem Olajuwon 20; Rebs: Hakeem Olajuwon 14; Asts: Hakeem Olajuwon 5
Series tied, 2–2

The Summit, Houston, Texas
Attendance: 16,611
Referees: Dan Crawford, Ron Garretson, Ed T. Rush

NBC

May 30
9:00 PM

Boxscore

Houston Rockets 111, San Antonio Spurs 90
Scoring by quarter: 32–18, 18–27, 32–28, 29–17
Pts: Hakeem Olajuwon 42; Rebs: Robert Horry 13; Asts: Sam Cassell 12	Pts: David Robinson 22; Rebs: Robinson, Rodman 12 each Asts: Avery Johnson 7
Houston leads series, 3–2

Alamodome, San Antonio, Texas
Attendance: 35,888
Referees: Hugh Evans, Jess Kersey, Bennett Salvatore

NBC

June 1
9:00 PM

Boxscore

San Antonio Spurs 95, Houston Rockets 100
Scoring by quarter: 21–21, 23–23, 31–32, 20–24
Pts: Robinson, Johnson 19 each Rebs: Dennis Rodman 17; Asts: Avery Johnson 10	Pts: Hakeem Olajuwon 39; Rebs: Hakeem Olajuwon 17; Asts: Clyde Drexler 7
Houston wins series, 4–2

The Summit, Houston, Texas
Attendance: 16,611
Referees: Hue Hollins, Paul Mihalak, Bill Oakes

- This is the last playoff match-up between Houston & San Antonio until 2017.

Regular-season series
San Antonio won 5–1 in the regular-season series

December 10, 1994

Recap

San Antonio Spurs 108, Houston Rockets 96

The Summit, Houston, Texas

December 23, 1994

Recap

Houston Rockets 96, San Antonio Spurs 98

Alamodome, San Antonio

January 13, 1995

Recap

San Antonio Spurs 100, Houston Rockets 103

The Summit, Houston, Texas

January 26, 1995

Recap

Houston Rockets 100, San Antonio Spurs 103

Alamodome, San Antonio

February 21, 1995

Recap

San Antonio Spurs 98, Houston Rockets 97

The Summit, Houston, Texas

March 5, 1995

Recap

Houston Rockets 103, San Antonio Spurs 124

Alamodome, San Antonio

This was the third playoff meeting between these two teams, with the Rockets winning the first two meetings.

Previous playoff series
Houston leads 2–0 in all-time playoff series

1980

Houston Rockets 2, San Antonio Spurs 1

1980 Eastern Conference First Round

1981

Houston Rockets 4, San Antonio Spurs 3

1981 Western Conference Semifinals

== NBA Finals: (E1) Orlando Magic vs. (W6) Houston Rockets ==
June 7

Boxscore

Houston Rockets 120, Orlando Magic 118 (OT)
Scoring by quarter: 19–30, 31–31, 37–19, 23–30, Overtime: 10–8
Pts: Hakeem Olajuwon 31; Rebs: Clyde Drexler 11; Asts: Kenny Smith 9	Pts: Hardaway, O'Neal 26 each Rebs: Grant, O'Neal 16 each Asts: Shaquille O'Neal 9
Houston leads series, 1–0

Orlando Arena, Orlando, Florida
Attendance: 16,010
Referees: Dick Bavetta, Joe Crawford, Steve Javie

- Nick Anderson missed 4 straight free throws to set up Kenny Smith's game-tying 3 with 1.6 seconds left; Robert Horry blocked Dennis Scott's 3-point attempt at the buzzer in regulation; Hakeem Olajuwon tipped in Clyde Drexler's missed layup with 0.3 seconds left in OT.

June 9

Boxscore

Houston Rockets 117, Orlando Magic 106
Scoring by quarter: 28–19, 35–22, 27–30, 27–35
Pts: Hakeem Olajuwon 34; Rebs: Hakeem Olajuwon 11; Asts: Clyde Drexler 5	Pts: Shaquille O'Neal 33; Rebs: Shaquille O'Neal 12; Asts: Penny Hardaway 8
Houston leads series, 2–0

Orlando Arena, Orlando, Florida
Attendance: 16,010
Referees: Dan Crawford, Hue Hollins, Ed T. Rush

- Orlando became the 2nd team in NBA Finals history to lose the first two games while having home-court advantage.

June 11

Boxscore

Orlando Magic 103, Houston Rockets 106
Scoring by quarter: 30–28, 23–26, 22–21, 28–31
Pts: Shaquille O'Neal 28; Rebs: three players 10 each Asts: Penny Hardaway 14	Pts: Hakeem Olajuwon 31; Rebs: Hakeem Olajuwon 14; Asts: Drexler, Olajuwon 7 each
Houston leads series, 3–0

The Summit, Houston, Texas
Attendance: 16,611
Referees: Hugh Evans, Mike Mathis, Bennett Salvatore

- Robert Horry's clutch 3 with 14.1 seconds left put Houston up 104–100.

June 14

Boxscore

Orlando Magic 101, Houston Rockets 113
Scoring by quarter: 21–23, 30–24, 25–30, 25–36
Pts: Hardaway, O'Neal 25 each Rebs: Grant, O'Neal 12 each Asts: Penny Hardaway 5	Pts: Hakeem Olajuwon 35; Rebs: Hakeem Olajuwon 15; Asts: Clyde Drexler 8
Houston wins series, 4–0

The Summit, Houston, Texas
Attendance: 16,611
Referees: Joe Crawford, Jess Kersey, Bill Oakes

- Hakeem Olajuwon brought the Finals to a close by hitting a three-pointer over Shaquille O'Neal with 11.5 seconds left.

Regular-season series
Orlando won 2–0 in the regular-season series

November 23, 1994

Recap

Houston Rockets 94, Orlando Magic 117

Orlando Arena, Orlando, Florida

March 2, 1995

Recap

Orlando Magic 107, Houston Rockets 96

The Summit, Houston, Texas

This was the first playoff meeting between the Rockets and the Magic.

== Statistical leaders ==
Category	Game high			Average			
Category	Player	Team	High	Player	Team	Avg.	GP
Points	Michael Jordan	Chicago Bulls	48	Hakeem Olajuwon	Houston Rockets	33.0	22
Rebounds	Charles Barkley	Phoenix Suns	23	Dennis Rodman	San Antonio Spurs	14.8	14
Assists	Anfernee Hardaway; Sherman Douglas	Orlando Magic; Boston Celtics	15	Rod Strickland	Portland Trail Blazers	9.8	3
Steals	Robert Horry	Houston Rockets	7	Nate McMillan	Seattle SuperSonics	2.5	4
Blocks	Alonzo Mourning	Charlotte Hornets	7	Alonzo Mourning	Charlotte Hornets	3.3	4

== Notes ==
- Both #5 seeds beat their #4 seeded opponent in the first round for the third straight year.
- The Rockets are the lowest seeded team to win a title (#6).
- In the Eastern Conference Semifinals, the Pacers had earned the #2 seed via the Central Division title, but the Knicks had homecourt advantage because of a better regular season record.
- Jordan changed his number back to 23 after the game 1 loss to the Orlando Magic, which led to him being fined.
