= 1982–83 St. Francis Terriers men's basketball team =

American college basketball season

1982–83 St. Francis Terriers men's basketball
- Conference: ECAC Metro
- North Division
- Record: 10–18 (7–7 ECAC Metro)
- Head coach: Gene Roberti (4th season)
- Home arena: Generoso Pope Athletic Complex

1982–83 ECAC Metro men's basketball standings
	Conf.				Overall
Team	W		L	PCT	W		L	PCT
North
Long Island	11	–	3	.786	20	–	9	.690
Fairleigh Dickinson	9	–	5	.643	17	–	12	.586
St. Francis (NY)	7	–	7	.500	10	–	18	.357
Marist	7	–	7	.500	14	–	15	.483
Siena	6	–	8	.429	12	–	16	.429
Wagner	2	–	12	.143	10	–	18	.357
South
Robert Morris †	12	–	2	.857	23	–	8	.742
Saint Francis (PA)	7	–	7	.500	12	–	17	.414
Baltimore	4	–	10	.286	10	–	18	.357
Loyola (MD)	3	–	11	.214	4	–	24	.143
† 1983 ECAC Metro tournament winner Rankings from AP Poll

The 1982–83 St. Francis Terriers men's basketball team represented St. Francis College during the 1982–83 NCAA Division I men's basketball season. The team was coached by Gene Roberti, who was in his fourth year at the helm of the St. Francis Terriers. The Terrier's home games were played at the Generoso Pope Athletic Complex. The team has been a member of the Northeast Conference since 1981, although at this time the conference was known as the ECAC Metro Conference. Also at this time the conference had 2 divisions, north and south, with St. Francis being in the north division.

The Terriers finished their season at 10–18 overall and 7–7 in conference play.

== Roster ==
1982–83 St. Francis Brooklyn Terriers men's basketball team
Players
Coaches

Pos.	#	Name	Height	Weight	Year	Previous school	Hometown
F		Kevin Henry	6 ft 5 in (1.96 m)	—	Sr
G		Edgar DeLaRosa	6 ft 0 in (1.83 m)	—	Sr
F		Lorenzo Distant	6 ft 5 in (1.96 m)	—	Sr
G		Darius Pearson	6 ft 3 in (1.91 m)	—	Sr
G		Kevin Worth	6 ft 3 in (1.91 m)	—	Sr
F		Robert Jackson	6 ft 8 in (2.03 m)	—	Jr
C		Julian McKelly	6 ft 10 in (2.08 m)	—	So	St. Esteban Episcopal School	Santo Domingo, Dominican Republic
F		Theo Graham	6 ft 6 in (1.98 m)	—	Fr
G		Brian LaGrua	6 ft 2 in (1.88 m)	—	Fr
G		Jerome Washington	5 ft 10 in (1.78 m)	—	Fr
G		Jim Paguaga	6 ft 0 in (1.83 m)	—	Fr

Head coach

- Gene Roberti

Assistant coach(es)

Legend

- (C) Team captain
- (S) Suspended
- (I) Ineligible
- (W) Walk-on
- Injured
- Current redshirt

== Schedule and results ==
Date time, TV	Opponent	Result	Record	Site (attendance) city, state
Regular season
November 27, 1982*	at Marshall	L 59–83	0–1	Cam Henderson Center (6,613); Huntington, WV
December 2, 1982*	at Georgia Tech	L 54–76	0–2	McCamish Pavilion (3,375); Atlanta, GA
December __, 1982*	at Stetson	L 62–64	0–3	Edmunds Center (3,847); DeLand, FL
December 9, 1982	at Wagner	W 90–75	1–3 (1–0)	Sutter Gymnasium (1,500); Staten Island, NY
December __, 1982*	Manhattan	L 57–59	1–4	Generoso Pope Athletic Complex (1,412); Brooklyn, NY
December 17, 1982*	at No. 11 Tennessee	L 51–70	1–5	Stokely Athletic Center (12,643); Knoxville, TN
December 18, 1982*	vs. UC Santa Barbara	W 67–57	2–5	Stokely Athletic Center (12,700); Knoxville, TN
December __, 1982*	Canisius	W 59–53	3–5	Generoso Pope Athletic Complex (411); Brooklyn, NY
December __, 1982*	at Boston University	L 64–80	3–6	Case Gym (843); Boston, MA
December 1982*	Pace	W 109–84	4–6	Generoso Pope Athletic Complex (210); Brooklyn, NY
January 5, 1983	at Long Island; Battle of Brooklyn	W 81–72	5–6 (2–0)	Schwartz Athletic Center (1,500); Brooklyn, NY
January __, 1983*	Vermont	L 65–67	5–7	Generoso Pope Athletic Complex (241); Brooklyn, NY
January 18, 1983	Long Island	L 70–80	5–8 (2–1)	Generoso Pope Athletic Complex (2,011); Brooklyn, NY
January __, 1983	at Fairleigh Dickinson	L 70–83	5–9 (2–2)	(9,300); Rutherford, NJ
January __, 1983	Robert Morris	L 77–80	5–10 (2–3)	Generoso Pope Athletic Complex (714); Brooklyn, NY
January __, 1983*	at Saint Peter's	L 68–76	5–11	Yanitelli Center (1,000); Jersey City, NJ
January __, 1983	at Saint Francis (PA)	L 78–83	5–12 (2–4)	Maurice Stokes Athletic Center (3,115); Loretto, PA
February 2, 1983	Fairleigh Dickinson	W 71–70	6–12 (3–4)	Generoso Pope Athletic Complex (1,119); Brooklyn, NY
February __, 1983*	at Utica	L 48–61	6–13	Harold Thomas Clark Jr. Athletic Center (1,487); Utica, NY
February __, 1983	Wagner	W 76–68	7–13 (4–4)	Generoso Pope Athletic Complex (639); Brooklyn, NY
February __, 1983	Marist	W 79–65	8–13 (5–4)	Generoso Pope Athletic Complex (376); Brooklyn, NY
February __, 1983	at Siena	L 64–72	8–14 (5–5)	Alumni Recreation Center (2,765); Loudonville, NY
February __, 1983	at Marist	L 61–66	8–15 (5–6)	McCann Arena (748); Poughkeepsie, NY
February __, 1983	Siena	W 93–76	9–15 (6–6)	Generoso Pope Athletic Complex (436); Brooklyn, NY
February __, 1983	at Loyola (MD)	L 69–76	9–16 (6–7)	Reitz Arena (837); Baltimore, MD
February __, 1983	U of Baltimore	W 73–68	10–16 (7–7)	Generoso Pope Athletic Complex (1,679); Brooklyn, NY
March 2, 1983*	at Army	L 71–85	10–17	Christl Arena (123); West Point, NY
ECAC Metro tournament
March 9, 1983	vs. Wagner; Quarterfinal	L 65–67	10–18	John Jay Center (2,003); Moon Township, PA
*Non-conference game. ^{#}Rankings from AP Poll. (#) Tournament seedings in parentheses. All times are in Eastern Time.
