= 1981–82 St. Francis Terriers men's basketball team =

American college basketball season

1981–82 St. Francis Terriers men's basketball
- Conference: ECAC Metro
- North Division
- Record: 10–17 (8–7 ECAC Metro)
- Head coach: Gene Roberti (3rd season)
- Home arena: Generoso Pope Athletic Complex

1981–82 ECAC Metro men's basketball standings
	Conf.				Overall
Team	W		L	PCT	W		L	PCT
North
Fairleigh Dickinson	12	–	3	.800	16	–	11	.593
Long Island	11	–	4	.733	20	–	10	.667
Siena	8	–	7	.533	15	–	13	.536
St. Francis (NY)	8	–	7	.533	10	–	17	.370
Marist	6	–	9	.400	12	–	14	.462
Wagner	1	–	14	.067	4	–	22	.154
South
Robert Morris †	9	–	5	.643	17	–	13	.567
Baltimore	8	–	6	.571	15	–	13	.536
Towson State	7	–	7	.500	10	–	17	.370
Loyola (MD)	7	–	7	.500	11	–	16	.407
Saint Francis (PA)	3	–	11	.214	6	–	20	.231
† 1982 ECAC Metro tournament winner Rankings from AP Poll

The 1981–82 St. Francis Terriers men's basketball team represented St. Francis College during the 1981–82 NCAA Division I men's basketball season. The team was coached by Gene Roberti, who was in his third year at the helm of the St. Francis Terriers. The Terriers played their homes games at the Generoso Pope Athletic Complex. This is the team's first year in the newly organized ECAC Metro Conference, which will later be known as the Northeast Conference. Also at this time the conference had 2 divisions, north and south, with St. Francis competing in the north division.

The Terriers finished their season at 10–17 overall and 8–7 in conference play. They participated in the 1982 ECAC Metro men's basketball tournament and lost in the opening round to Long Island 53–56.

== Roster ==
1981–82 St. Francis Brooklyn Terriers men's basketball team
Players
Coaches

Pos.	#	Name	Height	Weight	Year	Previous school	Hometown
G		Ken Berry	5 ft 11 in (1.8 m)	—	Sr
F		Kevin Henry	6 ft 5 in (1.96 m)	—	Jr
G		Edgar DeLaRosa	6 ft 0 in (1.83 m)	—	Jr
F		Lorenzo Distant	6 ft 5 in (1.96 m)	—	Jr
G		Darius Pearson	6 ft 3 in (1.91 m)	—	Jr
F		Joel Carpenter	6 ft 5 in (1.96 m)	—	Jr
C		Terry Bunn	6 ft 8 in (2.03 m)	—	Jr
F		Robert Jackson	6 ft 8 in (2.03 m)	—	So
G		Terry Lacewell	6 ft 3 in (1.91 m)	—	So
G		George Lambert	6 ft 4 in (1.93 m)	—	So
C		Julian McKelly	6 ft 10 in (2.08 m)	—	Fr	St. Esteban Episcopal School	Santo Domingo, Dominican Republic

Head coach

- Gene Roberti

Assistant coach(es)

Legend

- (C) Team captain
- (S) Suspended
- (I) Ineligible
- (W) Walk-on
- Injured
- Current redshirt

== Schedule and results ==
Date time, TV	Opponent	Result	Record	Site (attendance) city, state
Regular season
November 28, 1981*	at Boston University	L 76–87	0–1	Case Gym (558); Boston, MA
December 1, 1981*	Villanova	L 63–93	0–2	Generoso Pope Athletic Complex (2,000); Brooklyn, NY
December 5, 1981	at Wagner	W 62–58	1–2 (1–0)	Sutter Gymnasium (1,510); Staten Island, NY
December 12, 1981	Siena	W 82–59	2–2 (2–0)	Generoso Pope Athletic Complex (1,251); Brooklyn, NY
December 15, 1981*	at Manhattan	L 59–68	2–3	Draddy Gymnasium (850); Bronx, NY
December 19, 1982	at Fairleigh Dickinson	L 82–84 ^{OT}	2–4 (2–1)	(256); Rutherford, NJ
December 22, 1981*	Hofstra	W 62–61 ^{OT}	3–4	Generoso Pope Athletic Complex (817); Brooklyn, NY
December 29, 1981*	at Eastern Montana College; KOA Classic	L 47–60	3–5	METRA Arena (4,130); Billings, MT
December 30, 1981*	vs. Gonzaga; KOA Classic	L 51–65	3–6	METRA Arena (4,120); Billings, MT
January 5, 1982	at Long Island	L 84–90	3–7 (2–2)	Schwartz Athletic Center (802); Brooklyn, NY
January 8, 1982*	vs. UNC Wilmington; Siena Tournament	L 47–53	3–8	Alumni Recreation Center (2,832); Loudonville, NY
January 9, 1982*	vs. Illinois-Chicago; Siena Tournament	L 68–81	3–9	Alumni Recreation Center (3,422); Loudonville, NY
January 13, 1982*	at Vermont	W 62–58	4–9	Patrick Gym (1,920); Burlington, VT
January 16, 1982	at Marist	L 65–75	4–10 (2–3)	McCann Arena (837); Poughkeepsie, NY
January 18, 1982	Long Island	L 70–80	4–11 (2–4)	Generoso Pope Athletic Complex (701); Brooklyn, NY
January 23, 1982	at U of Baltimore	W 58–51	5–11 (3–4)	(175); Baltimore, MD
January 27, 1982	at Siena	L 49–53	5–12 (3–5)	Alumni Recreation Center (2,197); Loudonville, NY
January 30, 1982	at Robert Morris	L 52–58	5–13 (3–6)	John Jay Center (997); Moon Township, PA
February 4, 1982	Saint Francis (PA)	W 88–73	6–13 (4–6)	Generoso Pope Athletic Complex (511); Brooklyn, NY
February 6, 1982*	at Canisius	L 65–80	6–14	Koessler Athletic Center (8,103); Buffalo, NY
February 10, 1982	Wagner	W 76–61	7–14 (5–6)	Generoso Pope Athletic Complex (603); Brooklyn, NY
February 13, 1982	at Loyola (MD)	W 63–58	8–14 (6–6)	Reitz Arena (616); Baltimore, MD
February 17, 1982	Marist	W 78–71	9–14 (7–6)	Generoso Pope Athletic Complex (903); Brooklyn, NY
February 20, 1982	Townson	W 56–54	10–14 (7–7)	Generoso Pope Athletic Complex (1,001); Brooklyn, NY
February 25, 1982*	Saint Peter's	L 47–56	10–15	Generoso Pope Athletic Complex (764); Brooklyn, NY
February 27, 1982	Fairleigh Dickinson	L 80–96	10–16 (8–7)	Generoso Pope Athletic Complex (688); Brooklyn, NY
ECAC Metro tournament
March 2, 1982	at Long Island; Quarterfinal	L 53–56	10–17	Schwartz Athletic Center (750); Brooklyn, NY
*Non-conference game. ^{#}Rankings from AP Poll. (#) Tournament seedings in parentheses. All times are in Eastern Time.
