= Rik Smits =

Dutch basketball player (born 1966)

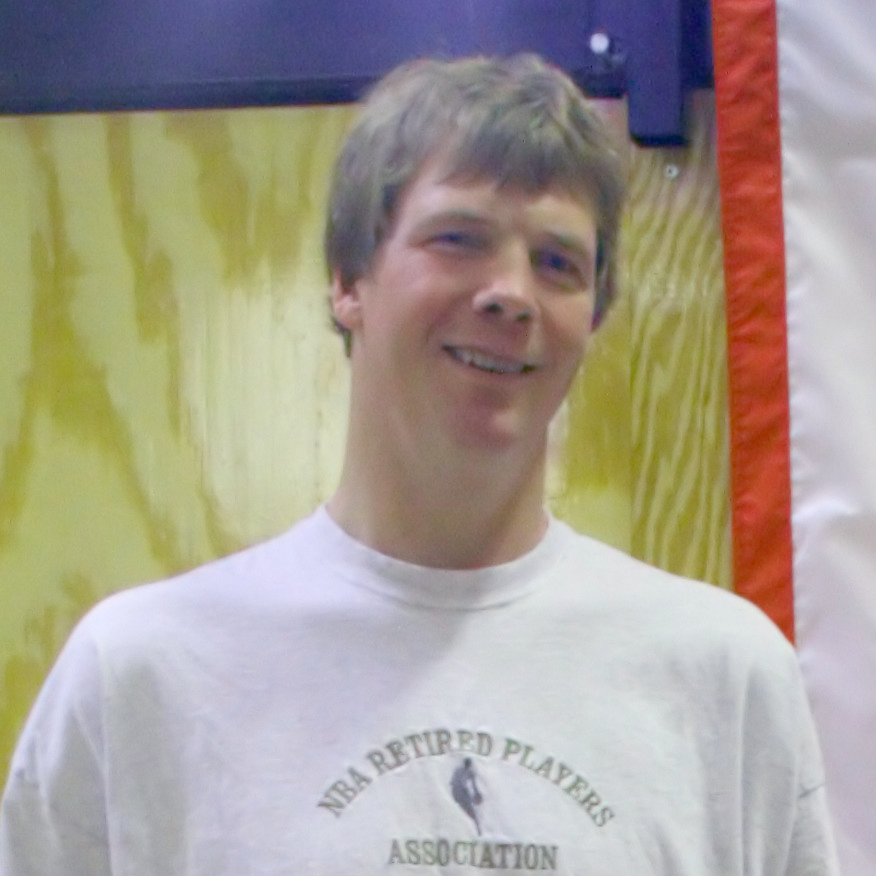
- Smits in 2008

Personal information
- Born: 23 August 1966 (age 60) Eindhoven, Netherlands
- Listed height: 2.24 m (7 ft 4 in)
- Listed weight: 120 kg (265 lb)

Career information
- College: Marist (1984–1988)
- NBA draft: 1988: 1st round, 2nd overall pick
- Drafted by: Indiana Pacers
- Playing career: 1988–2000
- Position: Center
- Number: 24, 45

Career history
- 1988–2000: Indiana Pacers

Career highlights
- NBA All-Star (1998); NBA All-Rookie First Team (1989); 2× ECAC Metro Player of the Year (1987, 1988); 3× First-team All-ECAC Metro (1986–1988); ECAC Metro Newcomer of the Year (1985); ECAC Metro tournament MVP (1986); No. 45 retired by Marist Red Foxes

Career NBA statistics
- Points: 12,871 (14.8 ppg)
- Rebounds: 5,277 (6.1 rpg)
- Blocks: 1,111 (1.3 bpg)
- Stats at NBA.com
- Stats at Basketball Reference

Rik Smits (born 23 August 1966), nicknamed "the Dunking Dutchman", is a Dutch former professional basketball player who spent his entire career with the Indiana Pacers of the National Basketball Association (NBA). The 2.24 m (7 ft 4 in) center was drafted by the Pacers out of Marist College with the second overall pick in the 1988 NBA draft. An NBA All-Star in 1998, Smits reached the NBA Finals in 2000.

== Early life and college career ==
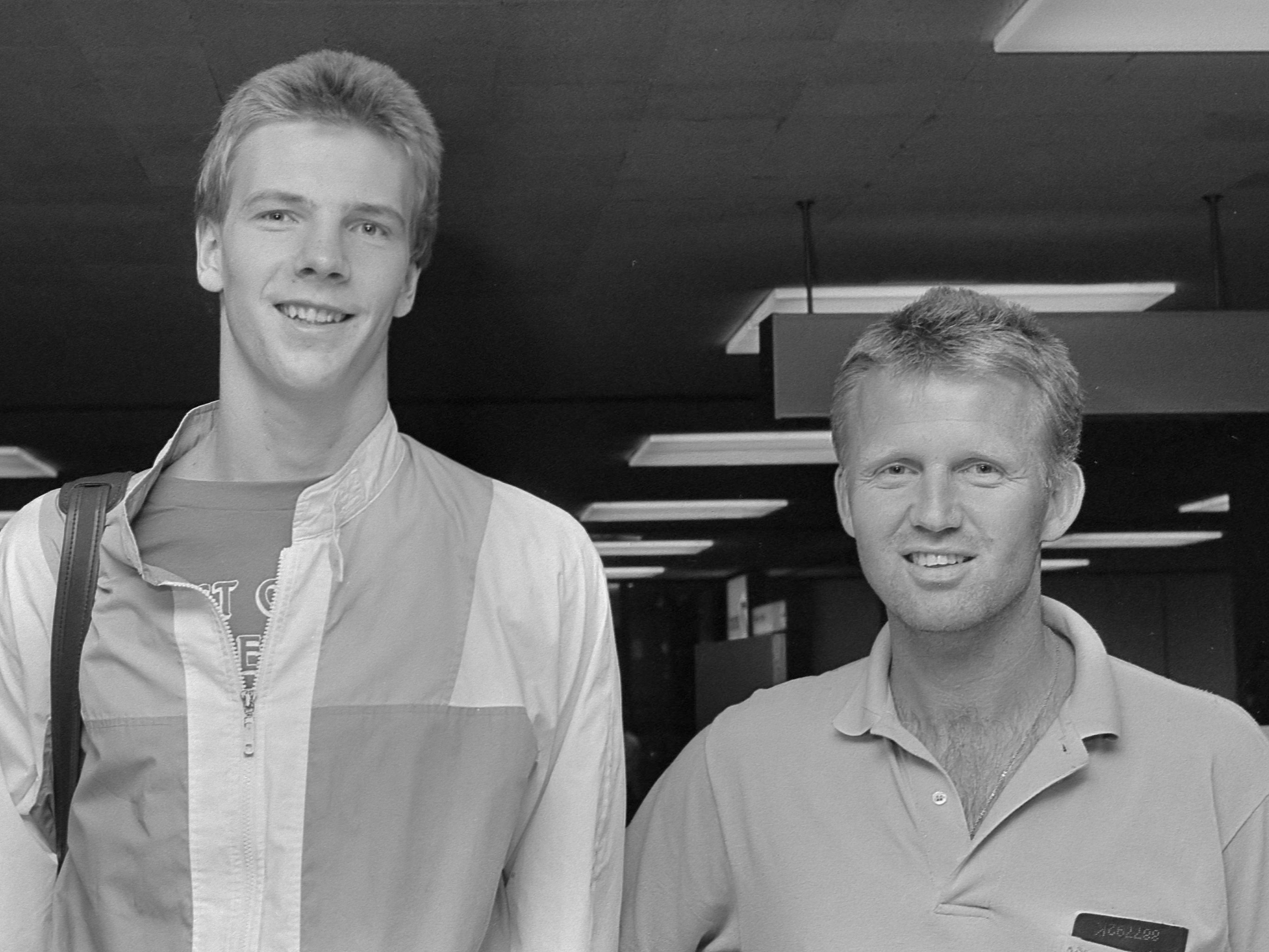
Rik Smits and Ruud Harrewijn in 1986

Smits was born in Eindhoven. He started playing basketball at age 14 at PSV–Almonte in Eindhoven. Smits left for the United States in 1984, where he played for Marist College for four years.

In 1986, Smits led Marist to the ECAC Metro Conference tournament Championship and advanced to play in their first NCAA tournament in school history. In 1987, he led the Red Foxes to 20 wins for the first time in its Division I history and another appearance in the NCAA tournament.

Smits briefly appeared in the 1988 film Coming to America during a scene filmed in 1987 while Marist played against St. John's at Madison Square Garden.

Smits was drafted second overall in the 1988 NBA draft by the Indiana Pacers. He became the first Marist player to play in the NBA, and remains the only NBA or WNBA player from the school as of 2026. In 2012, his jersey was retired by Marist.

== NBA career ==
He spent his entire professional career playing for the Indiana Pacers. With the Pacers, Smits originally backed up Steve Stipanovich, but when Stipanovich suffered a career-ending injury, Smits ended up starting 71 games in his rookie year, averaging 11.7 points and 6.1 rebounds per game and earning All-Rookie First Team honors. Smits continued to average double-digit point totals in every year of his career, but it wasn't until the 1993–94 NBA season that Smits really came into his own as a team leader.

Throughout the Pacers' playoff runs in the mid and late 1990s, Smits was considered the number two player, behind Reggie Miller, on the deeply talented Pacers. Smits' highest point-per-game average was in 1995–96 when he averaged 18.5 points per game. That season on 10 December, Smits scored a career-high 44 points during a 111–104 win over the Los Angeles Clippers. He was relatively modest by NBA "superstar" standards, but the Dutchman endeared himself to Pacers fans with outstanding playoff performances, most notably in Game 4 of the 1995 Eastern Conference Finals, where he made a buzzer-beating shot to tie the series.

Smits was named to the Eastern Conference All-Star Team in 1998, delivering ten points, seven rebounds and four assists, including a behind-the-back pass to New Jersey Nets forward Jayson Williams who followed immediately with a slam dunk.

Unable to find shoes in his size growing up in the Netherlands, Smits developed nerve damage in his feet from wearing tight shoes as a teenager. To help recover during the off-season, he spent time relaxing at his summer retreat in Walton, New York, where he was a regular attendee of The Afton Fair. Foot problems hobbled Smits for the majority of his career, and he retired at the conclusion of the Pacers' 1999–2000 season, after Indiana was defeated by the Los Angeles Lakers in the NBA Finals 4 games to 2.

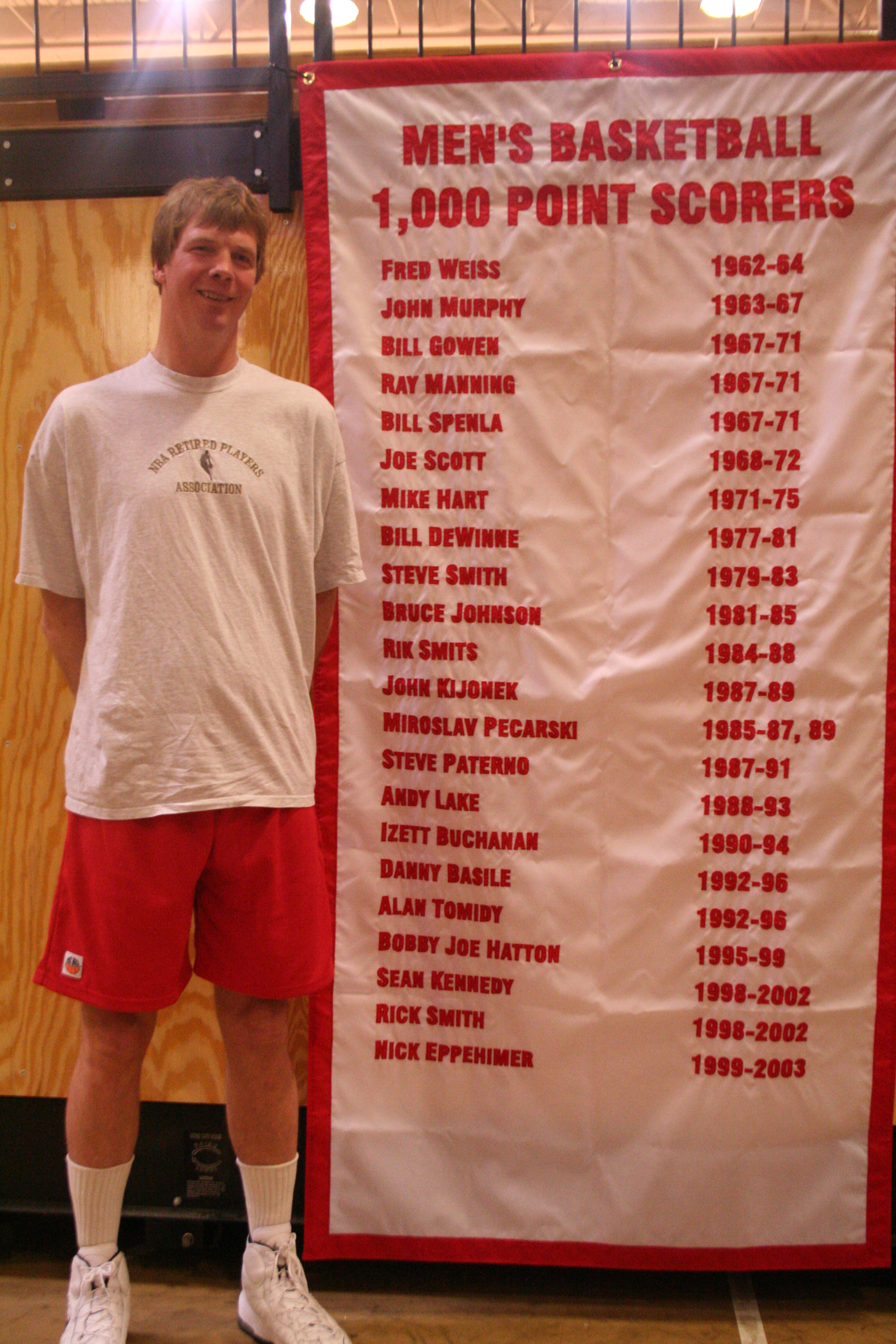
Rik Smits visits Marist College on Alumni Day.

After four surgeries to repair nerve damage to his feet, Smits underwent intensive back surgery in November 2009 to correct cracks in one joint that link his vertebrae. Smits has also undergone arthroscopic surgery on his left knee and had bone chips removed from his left ankle.

Smits was selected to the Pacers' 40th Anniversary Team, chosen by the fans. He ended up with the fourth most votes, trailing only Reggie Miller, Mel Daniels, and Jermaine O'Neal.

== National team career ==
Smits has also played for the senior Netherlands national team. He played in the 1986 FIBA World Championship and EuroBasket 1987.

== Life after the NBA ==
After his retirement, Smits has devoted his time to collecting and racing vintage motocross motorcycles. On 30 November 2011, Smits was featured in Yahoo! Sports, about his formal participation in competitive motocross racing. In 2007 Smits appeared on an episode of Pros vs. Joes. In 2008 Smits won the AHRMA Vintage National Premier 500 Intermediate Class riding a BSA 500.

In 1998, near the end of his playing career, Smits bought a home in the Indianapolis suburb of Zionsville, Indiana, and continued to live in the home for nearly 20 years, expanding it in 2014 to include a regulation-size basketball half-court. Smits used two barns on the 5.1 ha (12.5 acres) property to house his motorcycles and cars, and built a dedicated motorcycle track in the rear of the property. He and his girlfriend put the property up for sale in the summer of 2017, shortly after they moved to Arizona.

== NBA career statistics ==
Legend
GP	Games played	GS	Games started	MPG	Minutes per game
FG%	Field goal percentage	3P%	3-point field goal percentage	FT%	Free throw percentage
RPG	Rebounds per game	APG	Assists per game	SPG	Steals per game
BPG	Blocks per game	PPG	Points per game	**Bold**	Career high
*	Led the league

=== Regular season ===
Year	Team	GP	GS	MPG	FG%	3P%	FT%	RPG	APG	SPG	BPG	PPG
1988–89	Indiana	**82***	71	24.9	.517	.000	.722	6.1	.9	.4	1.8	11.7
1989–90	Indiana	**82***	**82***	29.3	.533	.000	.811	6.2	1.7	**.6**	**2.1**	15.5
1990–91	Indiana	76	38	22.2	.485	—	.762	4.7	1.1	.3	1.5	10.9
1991–92	Indiana	74	55	23.9	.510	.000	.788	5.6	1.6	.4	1.4	13.8
1992–93	Indiana	81	81	25.6	.486	—	.732	5.3	1.5	.3	.9	14.3
1993–94	Indiana	78	75	27.1	**.534**	.000	.793	6.2	**2.0**	**.6**	1.0	15.7
1994–95	Indiana	78	78	**30.5**	.526	.000	.753	**7.7**	1.4	.5	1.0	17.9
1995–96	Indiana	63	63	30.2	.521	.200	.788	6.9	1.7	.3	.7	**18.5**
1996–97	Indiana	52	52	29.2	.486	**.250**	.797	6.9	1.3	.4	1.1	17.1
1997–98	Indiana	73	69	28.6	.495	.000	.783	6.9	1.4	**.6**	1.2	16.7
1998–99	Indiana	49	49	25.9	.490	.000	**.818**	5.6	1.1	.4	1.1	14.9
1999–00	Indiana	79	79	23.4	.484	.000	.739	5.1	1.1	.2	1.3	12.9
Career		867	792	26.6	.507	.115	.773	6.1	1.4	.4	1.2	14.8
All-Star		1	0	21.0	.429	—	1.000	7.0	4.0	.0	2.0	10.0

=== Playoffs ===
Year	Team	GP	GS	MPG	FG%	3P%	FT%	RPG	APG	SPG	BPG	PPG
1990	Indiana	3	3	32.0	.500	—	.818	5.3	1.0	.7	1.3	12.3
1991	Indiana	5	0	17.6	.568	—	.875	3.6	.4	.2	**1.4**	9.8
1992	Indiana	3	1	9.3	.364	—	**1.000**	2.0	.0	.7	.3	3.3
1993	Indiana	4	4	**35.8**	**.578**	.000	.727	**8.0**	1.8	**1.2**	1.0	**22.5**
1994	Indiana	16	16	28.1	.472	—	.806	5.3	1.9	.6	.6	16.0
1995	Indiana	17	17	32.1	.547	**1.000**	.804	7.0	**2.0**	.3	.8	20.1
1996	Indiana	5	5	33.2	.545	—	.786	7.4	1.6	.4	.4	19.0
1998	Indiana	16	16	29.8	.502	.000	.859	5.3	1.3	.5	.9	16.6
1999	Indiana	13	13	22.5	.456	—	.950	5.0	.7	.5	1.2	11.8
2000	Indiana	**22**	**21**	21.0	.498	.000	.875	3.5	1.0	.4	.9	11.0
Career		104	96	26.4	.507	.250	.829	5.2	1.3	.5	.9	14.8

== Personal life ==
Smits has two children, a daughter named Jasmine and son named Derrik. Jasmine Smits is currently the Player Relations Coordinator for the Indiana Pacers and the Pacers farm team Noblesville Boom. Derrik Smits, listed at 2.16 m (7 ft 1 in) and 111 kg (245 lb), who played for the Valparaiso University men's basketball team from 2016 to 2019 and played his final season of college eligibility in 2019–20 at Butler University. Derrik was forced to redshirt the 2015–16 season due to an injury, and began play the following season at Valparaiso. He graduated from Valparaiso in December 2018, taking graduate-level courses in the 2019 spring term to maintain his basketball eligibility; his graduation made him immediately eligible to play at Butler.

== See also ==
- List of NBA players who have spent their entire career with one franchise
- List of tallest players in National Basketball Association history
