= 1985–86 St. Francis Terriers men's basketball team =

American college basketball season

1985–86 St. Francis Terriers men's basketball
- Conference: ECAC Metro
- Record: 9–19 (4–12 NEC)
- Head coach: Bob Valvano (2nd season)
- Home arena: Generoso Pope Athletic Complex

1985–86 ECAC Metro men's basketball standings
	Conf.				Overall
Team	W		L	PCT	W		L	PCT
Fairleigh Dickinson	13	–	3	.813	22	–	8	.733
Marist†	11	–	5	.688	19	–	12	.613
Loyola (MD)	10	–	6	.625	16	–	12	.571
Wagner	10	–	6	.625	16	–	13	.552
Saint Francis (PA)	8	–	8	.500	10	–	18	.357
Robert Morris	6	–	10	.375	10	–	18	.357
Monmouth*	6	–	10	.375	9	–	19	.321
St. Francis (NY)	4	–	12	.250	9	–	19	.321
Long Island	4	–	12	.250	9	–	19	.321
† 1986 ECAC Metro tournament winner Rankings from AP Poll; *Ineligible for conference tournament

The 1985–86 St. Francis Terriers men's basketball team represented St. Francis College during the 1985–86 NCAA Division I men's basketball season. The team was coached by Bob Valvano, who was in his second year at the helm of the St. Francis Terriers. The Terrier's home games were played at the Generoso Pope Athletic Complex. The team has been a member of the Northeast Conference since 1981, although at this time the conference was known as the ECAC Metro Conference.

The Terriers finished their season at 9–19 overall and 4–12 in conference play. They qualified for the NEC Tournament with the 7th seed, but lost in the opening round to eventual tournament champions Marist.

Jim Paguaga had two record setting games. On February 7, he recorded a program-record 16 assists against York College, and three days later on February 10, he recorded a then-program record 8 steals against Monmouth. The record was surpassed by Ron Arnold on February 4, 1993 when he recorded 11 stelas against Mount St. Mary's. Paguaga also set the Terrier record for most steals in a season with 120, which is 13th all-time in NCAA history.

== Roster ==
1985–86 St. Francis Brooklyn Terriers men's basketball team
Players
Coaches

Pos.	#	Name	Height	Weight	Year	Previous school	Hometown
G		Jim Paguaga	6 ft 0 in (1.83 m)	—	Sr
F		Theo Graham	6 ft 6 in (1.98 m)	—	Sr
C		Julian McKelly	6 ft 10 in (2.08 m)	—	Sr	St. Esteban Episcopal School	Santo Domingo, Dominican Republic
G		Brian LaGrua	6 ft 1 in (1.85 m)	—	Sr
C		Barry Leskun	6 ft 8 in (2.03 m)	—	Jr
F		Donald Pugh	6 ft 4 in (1.93 m)	—	Jr
F		Dickens Benoit	6 ft 4 in (1.93 m)	—	Jr
G		Lem Brabham	6 ft 0 in (1.83 m)	—	Jr
F		Blaine Drayton	6 ft 6 in (1.98 m)	—	Jr
F		Darwin Purdie	6 ft 6 in (1.98 m)	—	Fr	Wilmington, Delaware
G		Rodney Henry	6 ft 0 in (1.83 m)	—	Fr
G		Juan Jorge	6 ft 4 in (1.93 m)	—	Fr

Head coach

- Bob Valvano (Virginia Wesleyan '79)

Assistant coach(es)

Legend

- (C) Team captain
- (S) Suspended
- (I) Ineligible
- (W) Walk-on
- Injured
- Current redshirt

== Schedule and results ==
Date time, TV	Opponent	Result	Record	Site (attendance) city, state
Regular season
November , 1985*	Dowling	W 75–62	1–0	Generoso Pope Athletic Complex (850); Brooklyn, NY
November 30, 1985*	at Manhattan	W 70–66	2–0	Draddy Gymnasium (750); Bronx, NY
December 4, 1985*	at DePaul	L 48–93	2–1	Allstate Arena (8,543); Rosemont, IL
December __, 1985*	at Pace	L 67–69	2–2	(500); New York, NY
December 11, 1985*	Bucknell	L 68–73	2–3	Generoso Pope Athletic Complex (511); Brooklyn, NY
December 14, 1985*	Rider	W 82–66	3–3	Generoso Pope Athletic Complex (514); Brooklyn, NY
December , 1985*	Queens	W 60–56	4–3	Generoso Pope Athletic Complex (621); Brooklyn, NY
January 4, 1986	at Long Island; Battle of Brooklyn	L 66–76	4–4 (0–1)	Schwartz Athletic Center (1,000); Brooklyn, NY
January 8, 1986	at Marist	W 54–53	5–4 (1–1)	McCann Arena (1,150); Poughkeepsie, NY
January 10, 1986	at Monmouth; Monmouth Tournament	L 51–54	5–5 (1–2)	William T. Boylan Gymnasium (700); West Long Branch, NJ
January 11, 1986*	vs. Rider; Monmouth Tournament	L 72–81	5–6	William T. Boylan Gymnasium (700); West Long Branch, NJ
January 13, 1986	at Loyola (MD)	L 64–66	5–7 (1–3)	Reitz Arena (1,475); Baltimore, MD
January 16, 1986	Saint Francis (PA)	L 62–69	5–8 (1–4)	Generoso Pope Athletic Complex (516); Brooklyn, NY
January 18, 1986	Robert Morris	L 45–66	5–9 (1–5)	Generoso Pope Athletic Complex (754); Brooklyn, NY
January 22, 1986	at Fairleigh Dickinson	L 55–81	5–10 (1–6)	(300); Rutherford, NJ
January 25, 1986	at Wagner	W 65–62	6–10 (2–6)	Sutter Gymnasium (1,000); Staten Island, NY
January 30, 1986*	at Siena	L 56–64	6–11	Alumni Recreation Center (1,915); Loudonville, NY
February 1, 1986	Long Island	W 58–47	7–11 (3–6)	Generoso Pope Athletic Complex (1,010); Brooklyn, NY
February 3, 1986*	at Hofstra	L 58–75	7–12	Physical Fitness Center (1,423); Hempstead, NY
February __, 1986*	York	W 92–57	8–12	Generoso Pope Athletic Complex (350); Brooklyn, NY
February 10, 1986	Monmouth	W 71–69 ^{OT}	9–12 (4–6)	Generoso Pope Athletic Complex (650); Brooklyn, NY
February 12, 1986	Marist	L 52–62	9–13 (4–7)	Generoso Pope Athletic Complex (500); Brooklyn, NY
February 17, 1986	Loyola (MD)	L 53–63	9–14 (4–8)	Generoso Pope Athletic Complex (650); Brooklyn, NY
February 20, 1986	at Saint Francis (PA)	L 74–76	9–15 (4–9)	Maurice Stokes Athletic Center (1,100); Loretto, PA
February 22, 1986	at Robert Morris	L 60–61	9–16 (4–10)	Charles L. Sewall Center (1,000); Moon Township, PA
March 1, 1986	Wagner	L 74–85	9–17 (4–11)	Generoso Pope Athletic Complex (750); Brooklyn, NY
March 3, 1986	Fairleigh Dickinson	L 82–83 ^{OT}	9–18 (4–12)	Generoso Pope Athletic Complex (550); Brooklyn, NY
ECAC Metro tournament
March 4, 1986	vs. Marist; Quarterfinal	L 64–83	9–19	Charles L. Sewall Center (1,100); Moon Township, PA
*Non-conference game. ^{#}Rankings from AP Poll. (#) Tournament seedings in parentheses. All times are in Eastern Time.
