= Matt Furjanic =

American basketball coach

Biographical details
- Born: October 26, 1950 (age 76); Rankin, Pennsylvania, U.S.

Playing career
- 1968–1969: Pittsburgh
- 1969–1970: Point Park

Coaching career (HC unless noted)
- 1975–1977: General Braddock HS (assistant)
- 1977–1979: Robert Morris (assistant)
- 1979–1984: Robert Morris
- 1984–1986: Marist
- 1991–1995: Woodland Hills HS
- 1995–2000: Pitt-Greensburg
- 2000–2017: Polk State

Head coaching record
- Overall: 606–411 (.596)

Matthew Furjanic Jr. (born October 26, 1950) is an American former basketball coach. He was head coach for Robert Morris University men's basketball team between 1979 and 1984, Marist College men's basketball from 1984 to 1986, the Pitt Greensburg Bobcats from 1995 to 2000 and the Polk State Eagles between 2000 and 2017. He has coached for a total of 40 years, 35 of them as head coach.

== Background ==
Furjanic was born in Rankin, Pennsylvania. His parents were Matthew L. Furjanic Sr., and Mildred (Sedlak) Furjanic. His father was mayor of Rankin between 1954 and 1997. He attended the University of Pittsburgh before transferring to Point Park College, graduating in 1973 with a BA in Social Studies/Secondary Education. While at Pitt he played on the freshman's basketball team, and at Point Park he played on the junior varsity basketball team for one season.

== Coaching career ==
Furjanic started his career in 1972 as an assistant basketball coach at General Braddock High School in North Braddock, Pennsylvania before becoming head coach from 1975–77. From 1977–1979 he was assistant coach at Robert Morris University in Coraopolis and took the head coaching job from 1979 until 1984. In 1984 he became the head basketball coach at Marist College in Poughkeepsie, New York for two seasons. From 1991 to 1995 he was head coach at Woodland Hills High School in Pittsburgh.

From 1995 to 2000 Furjanic was head coach at the Pitt-Greensburg. He was then named head coach at Polk State College in Winter Haven, Florida, in 2000. While coaching the Eagles, Furjanic has an overall record of 319–214, which includes six Suncoast Conference titles (2013, 2011, 2009, 2008, 2004 and 2003), three Suncoast Conference tournament titles, and six Suncoast Conference Coach of the Year awards.

Furjanic has an overall coaching record of 606–411. His teams have won either a conference tournament or regular season championship in 20 seasons, and have reached the NCAA Division I men's basketball tournament three times (two times at Robert Morris and once at Marist).

== Awards and honors ==
Furjanic is a five time honoree in four Halls of Fame. He was inducted into the East Boros Chapter of the Pennsylvania Hall of Fame in 1990. In November 2007, Furjanic was inducted into the Robert Morris University Hall of Fame as a coach. He was also inducted again into the Robert Morris Hall of Fame in 2014 with his 1982–83 team, the first team in RMU history to play in the NCAA Tournament. In 2013, he was inducted into the Pittsburgh Basketball Club Hall of Fame. In March 2017, he was inducted into the NJCAA Region 8-FCSAA Men’s Basketball Hall of Fame.

== Coaching record ==
=== NCAA Division I ===
Record table
Season	Team	Overall	Conference	Standing	Postseason
Robert Morris University (ECAC Metro Conference) (1979–1984)
1979–80	Robert Morris	7–19			
1980–81	Robert Morris	9–18			
1981–82	Robert Morris	17–13	9–5	1st South	NCAA Division I Round of 64
1982–83	Robert Morris	23–8	12–2	1st South	NCAA Division I Round of 64
1983–84	Robert Morris	17–13	11–5	T–1st	
Marist College (ECAC Metro Conference) (1984–1986)
1984–85	Marist	17–12	11–3	1st	
1985–86	Marist	19–12	11–5	2nd	NCAA Division I Round of 64
Total:		109–95 (.534)			
National champion Postseason invitational champion Conference regular season champion Conference regular season and conference tournament champion Division regular season champion Division regular season and conference tournament champion Conference tournament champion

=== NCAA Division III ===
Record table
Season	Team	Overall	Conference	Standing	Postseason
Pitt-Greensburg (Allegheny Mountain Collegiate Conference) (1995–2000)
1995–96	Pitt-Greensburg	7–17			
1996–97	Pitt-Greensburg	14–10			
1997–98	Pitt-Greensburg	9–16			
1998–99	Pitt-Greensburg	17–9		1st	
1999–00	Pitt-Greensburg	21–9		1st	
Total:		68–61 (.527)			
National champion Postseason invitational champion Conference regular season champion Conference regular season and conference tournament champion Division regular season champion Division regular season and conference tournament champion Conference tournament champion

=== NJCAA ===
Record table
Season	Team	Overall	Conference	Standing	Postseason
Polk State College (Suncoast Conference) (2000–2017)
2000–01	Polk State	22–10			
2001–02	Polk State	16–16			
2002–03	Polk State	23–9		1st	
2003–04	Polk State	20–11		1st	
2004–05	Polk State	13–18			
2005–06	Polk State	16–16			
2006–07	Polk State	13–16			
2007–08	Polk State	24–6		1st	
2008–09	Polk State	26–6		1st	
2009–10	Polk State	17–13			
2010–11	Polk State	17–14		1st	
2011–12	Polk State	18–14			
2012–13	Polk State	22–9		1st	
2013–14	Polk State	18–14			
2014–15	Polk State	21–10			
2015–16	Polk State	23–9			
2016–17	Polk State	10–22			
Total:		319–214 (.598)			
National champion Postseason invitational champion Conference regular season champion Conference regular season and conference tournament champion Division regular season champion Division regular season and conference tournament champion Conference tournament champion
