= John Jay Center =

Athletic facility in Moon Township, Pennsylvania

Coordinates: 40.52173°N 80.20970°W

The John Jay Center is an athletic facility on the campus of Robert Morris University in the Pittsburgh suburb of Moon Township, Pennsylvania. Built in 1968, it features a capacity of 1,000 spectators. It was the primary campus indoor athletic venue until the Charles L. Sewall Center opened for the 1985–86 season. The Colonials men's basketball team played their first game as an NCAA Division I team at the center on November 30, 1976, a win over Delaware State. It was the home arena for the first two Robert Morris teams to play in the NCAA tournament (in 1982 and 1983). The Northeast Conference men's basketball championship tournament was held in the center in 1991. Today it is used for intramural sports but does maintain office space as well. By 2015 there were discussions about converting the building for academic use if and when RMU builds a new arena to replace the Sewall Center as the school's primary athletic facility.
