= Saint Francis Red Wolves men's basketball statistical leaders =

The Saint Francis Red Wolves men's basketball statistical leaders are individual statistical leaders of the Saint Francis Red Wolves men's basketball program in various categories, including points, assists, blocks, rebounds, and steals. Within those areas, the lists identify single-game, single-season, and career leaders. The Red Wolves represent Saint Francis University in the NCAA Division III Presidents' Athletic Conference. Before moving to Division III in 2026, SFU's nickname was Red Flash, and the university had been a member of the Division I Northeast Conference (officially NEC) since 1981.

Saint Francis began competing in intercollegiate basketball in 1918. However, the school's record book does not generally list records from before the 1950s, as records from before this period are often incomplete and inconsistent. Since scoring was much lower in this era, and teams played much fewer games during a typical season, it is likely that few or no players from this era would appear on these lists anyway.

The NCAA did not officially record assists as a statistic in Division I until the 1983–84 season, and blocks and steals until the 1985–86 season, but Saint Francis' record books includes players in these stats before these seasons. These lists are updated through the end of the 2020–21 season.

== Scoring ==
Career
Rk	Player	Points	Seasons
1	Joe Anderson	2,301	1987–88 1988–89 1989–90 1990–91
2	Maurice Stokes	2,282	1951–52 1952–53 1953–54 1954–55
3	Keith Braxton	2,054	2016–17 2017–18 2018–19 2019–20
4	Jeff Hamilton	1,810	1981–82 1982–83 1983–84 1984–85
5	Kevin Porter	1,766	1968–69 1969–70 1970–71 1971–72
6	Darshan Luckey	1,699	2002–03 2003–04 2004–05
7	Isaiah Blackmon	1,592	2015–16 2016–17 2017–18 2018–19 2019–20
8	Sandy Williams	1,546	1961–62 1962–63 1963–64
9	Devin Sweetney	1,529	2006–07 2007–08 2008–09 2009–10
10	Jamaal King	1,517	2015–16 2016–17 2017–18 2018–19

Season
Rk	Player	Points	Season
1	Mike Iuzzolino	772	1990–91
2	Maurice Stokes	760	1954–55
3	Joe Anderson	680	1990–91
4	Josh Cohen	676	2022–23
5	Sandy Williams	655	1963–64
6	Lamont Harris	643	1985–86
7	Joe Anderson	637	1988–89
8	Kevin Porter	618	1971–72
9	Maurice Stokes	600	1953–54
10	Darshan Luckey	605	2002–03

Single game
Rk	Player	Points	Season	Opponent
1	Larry Lewis	46	1968–69	St. Vincent
2	Maurice Stokes	43	1954–55	Dayton
3	Jack Phelan	42	1976–77	Duquesne
	Sandy Williams	42	1963–64	Kent State
5	Mike Iuzzolino	41	1990–91	Robert Morris
	Bob Nicholls	41	1974–75	Roanoke
7	Maurice Stokes	40	1954–55	John Carroll
	Maurice Stokes	40	1954–55	Wash. & Jeff
	Maurice Stokes	40		St. Vincent
	Lamont Harris	40	1985–86	LIU Brooklyn
	Kevin Porter	40	1971–72	Oral Roberts
	Josh Cohen	40	2022–23	Lehigh
	Josh Cohen	40	2022–23	Hawai'i

== Rebounds ==
Career
Rk	Player	Rebounds	Seasons
1	Maurice Stokes	1,819	1951–52 1952–53 1953–54 1954–55
2	Larry Lewis	1,324	1966–67 1967–68 1968–69
3	Keith Braxton	1,143	2016–17 2017–18 2018–19 2019–20
4	Jim McClellan	1,002	1954–55 1955–56 1956–57 1957–58
5	Eric Taylor	967	1994–95 1995–96 1996–97 1997–98
6	Joe Schoen	942	1977–78 1978–79 1979–80 1980–81
7	Wilbur Trosch	875	1957–58 1958–59 1959–60
8	Sandy Williams	833	1961–62 1962–63 1963–64
9	Joe Aston	831	1957–58 1958–59 1959–60
10	Mike Copeland	830	1968–69 1969–70 1970–71

Season
Rk	Player	Rebounds	Season
1	Maurice Stokes	733	1954–55
2	Maurice Stokes	689	1953–54
3	Larry Lewis	495	1968–69
4	Larry Lewis	443	1967–68
5	Maurice Stokes	397	1952–53
6	Larry Lewis	386	1966–67
7	Sandy Williams	355	1963–64
8	Ronnie Drinnon	329	2015–16
9	Mike Copeland	328	1969–70
10	Keith Braxton	323	2018–19
	Wilbur Trosch	323	1959–60

Single game
Rk	Player	Rebounds	Season	Opponent
1	Maurice Stokes	39	1954–55	John Carroll

== Assists ==
Career
Rk	Player	Assists	Seasons
1	Napoleon Lightning	589	1981–82 1982–83 1983–84 1984–85
2	Jamal Ragland	488	1997–98 1998–99 1999–00 2000–01
3	Keith Braxton	450	2016–17 2017–18 2018–19 2019–20
4	Bob Convey	440	1977–78 1978–79 1979–80 1980–81
	Greg Jacobs	440	1983–84 1984–85 1985–86 1986–87
6	Jamaal King	386	2015–16 2016–17 2017–18 2018–19
7	Cale Nelson	380	2004–05 2006–07 2007–08 2008–09
8	Jack Phelan	353	1973–74 1974–75 1975–76 1976–77
9	Malik Harmon	327	2013–14 2014–15 2015–16 2017–18
10	Garrett Farha	323	2004–05 2005–06
	Don Graham	323	1975–76 1976–77 1977–78 1978–79

Season
Rk	Player	Assists	Season
1	Norm Van Lier	290	1967–68
2	Napoleon Lightning	199	1982–83
3	Garrett Farha	194	2004–05
4	Napoleon Lightning	163	1981–82
5	Kevin Cofield	153	1987–88
6	Cale Nelson	146	2008–09
7	Bob Convey	142	1979–80
8	Napoleon Lightning	139	1983–84
9	Steve Cloran	136	1993–94
	Bob Convey	136	1980–81

Single game
Rk	Player	Assists	Season	Opponent
1	Pat McGeary	19	1974–75	Siena

== Steals ==
Career
Rk	Player	Steals	Seasons
1	Napoleon Lightning	200	1981–82 1982–83 1983–84 1984–85
2	Jason Roberts	196	1992–93 1993–94 1994–95 1995–96
3	Keith Braxton	193	2016–17 2017–18 2018–19 2019–20
4	Greg Jacobs	190	1983–84 1984–85 1985–86 1986–87
5	Joe Anderson	182	1987–88 1988–89 1989–90 1990–91
6	Jamal Ragland	163	1997–98 1998–99 1999–00 2000–01

Season
Rk	Player	Steals	Season
1	Napoleon Lightning	64	1983–84
2	Bill Hughes	58	1986–87
3	Jason Roberts	57	1992–93
4	Joe Anderson	55	1990–91
	Ramiir Dixon-Conover	55	2021–22
6	Napoleon Lightning	54	1982–83
	Jamal Ragland	54	2000–01
	Keith Braxton	54	2017–18

Single game
Rk	Player	Steals	Season	Opponent
1	Jason Roberts	8	1995–96	UNC-Greensboro
2	Greg Jacobs	7	1984–85	Wagner
	Terry Holliman	7	1991–92	Marist
	Darshan Luckey	7	2004–05	Howard
	Keith Braxton	7	2017–18	CCSU

== Blocks ==
Career
Rk	Player	Blocks	Seasons
1	Josh Nebo	145	2015–16 2016–17
2	Melvin Scott	137	1996–97 1997–98 1998–99 2000–01
3	Mark Flagg	119	2017–18 2018–19 2019–20 2020–21 2021–22
4	Jerry Mack	109	1985–86 1986–87 1987–88 1988–89
5	Earl Brown	105	2011–12 2012–13 2013–14 2014–15
	Emmanuel Adekunle	105	1994–95 1995–96 1996–97 1997–98
7	Lou Schmitt	77	1980–81 1981–82 1982–83 1983–84
8	Reggie Lewis	74	1989–90 1990–91 1991–92 1992–93 1993–94
9	Jason Osborne	71	2002–03 2003–04 2004–05
10	Will Felder	64	2009–10 2010–11

Season
Rk	Player	Blocks	Season
1	Josh Nebo	89	2016–17
2	Melvin Scott	70	2000–01
3	Josh Nebo	56	2015–16
4	Eli Wilborn	47	2023–24
5	Jerry Mack	43	1986–87
6	Will Felder	38	2010–11
7	Scott Eatherton	36	2011–12
	Jelani Lawrence	36	2005–06
9	Jerry Mack	35	1985–86
	Emmanuel Adekunle	35	1997–98

Single game
Rk	Player	Blocks	Season	Opponent
1	Josh Nebo	8	2016–17	Wagner
2	Josh Nebo	7	2016–17	Robert Morris
