= 1988–89 Robert Morris Colonials men's basketball team =

American college basketball season

1988–89 Robert Morris Colonials men's basketball

NEC Regular Season Champions NEC tournament champions

NCAA tournament
- Conference: Northeast Conference
- Record: 21–9 (12–4 NEC)
- Head coach: Jarrett Durham
- Home arena: Charles L. Sewall Center

1988–89 Northeast Conference men's basketball standings
	Conf.				Overall
Team	W		L	PCT	W		L	PCT
Robert Morris†	12	–	4	.750	21	–	9	.700
Fairleigh Dickinson	11	–	5	.688	17	–	12	.586
Marist*	9	–	7	.563	13	–	15	.464
Monmouth	9	–	7	.563	15	–	13	.536
Long Island	7	–	9	.438	9	–	19	.321
Loyola (MD)	7	–	9	.438	10	–	18	.357
Saint Francis (PA)	6	–	10	.375	13	–	16	.448
Wagner	6	–	10	.375	11	–	16	.407
St. Francis (NY)	5	–	11	.313	11	–	16	.407
† 1989 NEC tournament winner Rankings from AP Poll *Ineligible for conference tournament

The 1988–89 Robert Morris Colonials men's basketball team represented Robert Morris University in the 1988–89 NCAA Division I basketball season. Robert Morris was coached by Jarrett Durham and played their home games at the Charles L. Sewall Center in Moon Township, PA. The Colonials were members of the Northeast Conference. They finished the season 21–9, 12–4 in NEC play. They won the 1989 Northeast Conference men's basketball tournament to earn the conference's automatic bid to the 1989 NCAA Division I men's basketball tournament. They earned a 16 seed in the West Region and played top-ranked, No. 1 seed Arizona in the first round. The Colonials were beaten 94–60 to end their season.

== Roster ==
1988–89 Robert Morris Colonials men's basketball team
Players	Coaches
Pos. / # / Name / Height / Weight / Year / Hometown; F / / Vaughn Luton / 6 ft 6 in (1.98 m) / — / Sr	Head coach: Jarrett Durham; Assistant coach(es) Legend: (C) Team captain; (S) Suspended; (I) Ineligible; (W) Walk-on; Injured; Current redshirt

== Schedule and results ==
Date time, TV	Rank^{#}	Opponent^{#}	Result	Record	Site (attendance) city, state
Regular season
Nov 26, 1988*		at West Virginia	W 75–67	1–0	WVU Coliseum; Morgantown, West Virginia
Nov 30, 1988*		at Pittsburgh	L 62–75	1–1	Fitzgerald Field House; Pittsburgh, Pennsylvania
NEC tournament
Mar 2, 1989*		Long Island University; NEC Tournament Semifinal	W 63–52	18–8	Charles L. Sewall Center; Moon Township, Pennsylvania
Mar 3, 1989*		Fairleigh Dickinson; NEC tournament championship	W 67–66	19–8	Charles L. Sewall Center; Moon Township, Pennsylvania
NCAA tournament
Mar 16, 1989*	(16 W)	vs. (1 W) No. 1 Arizona; First Round	L 60–94	21–9	BSU Pavilion; Boise, Idaho
*Non-conference game. ^{#}Rankings from AP Poll. (#) Tournament seedings in parentheses.

== Awards and honors ==
- Vaughn Luton – NEC Player of the Year
- Jarrett Durham – NEC Coach of the Year
