= Northeast Conference Men's Basketball Coach of the Year =

Jim Phelan NEC Men's Basketball Coach of the Year
- Awarded for: the most outstanding men's basketball head coach in the Northeast Conference
- Country: United States

History
- First award: 1982–83
- Most recent: Rod Strickland, LIU

The Northeast Conference Men's Basketball Coach of the Year is a basketball award given to head coaches in the Northeast Conference (NEC). The award is presented to the head coach voted to be the most successful that season by the league's coaches. The award was first given following the 1982–83 season, the second year of the conference's existence, to Matt Furjanic of Robert Morris.

Howie Dickenman of Central Connecticut has won the most awards with four. Bashir Mason of Wagner has won three, and seven other coaches have won the award twice. One former NEC Coach of the Year has been inducted into the National Collegiate Basketball Hall of Fame as a coach: Jim Phelan (inducted 2001). Due to Phelan's success, in 2003 the NEC men's basketball coach of the year award was named in his honor. Also of note, the only year when the award was shared was in 1993 with Jim Phelan and Kevin Bannon as winners. The program with the most winners, both by total awards and distinct recipients, is former member Robert Morris, with six awards won by four coaches. Among current members, Wagner has the most by both criteria, with three coaches combining to win five awards. Two current members have not had a winner, but one of them is the league's newest member — Le Moyne, which joined in 2024. The other is Sacred Heart, a member since 1999. New Haven will play its first NEC season in 2025–26.

== Winners ==
Season	Coach	School	Conference Record	Conference Standing	Overall Record	Postseason	Source(s)
1982–83	Matt Furjanic	Robert Morris	12–2	1st (South Division)	23–8	NEC Champions; NCAA first round	
1983–84	Mark Amatucci	Loyola	10–6	T-3rd	16–12		
1984–85	Tom Green	Fairleigh Dickinson	10–4	2nd	21–10	NEC Champions; NCAA first round	
1985–86	Tom Green (2)	Fairleigh Dickinson	13–3	1st	22–8		
1986–87	Dave Magarity	Marist	15–1	1st	20–10	NEC Champions; NCAA first round	
1987–88	Wayne Szoke	Monmouth	11–5	T-3rd	16–13		
1988–89	Jarrett Durham	Robert Morris	12–4	1st	21–9	NEC Champions; NCAA first round	
1989–90	Jarrett Durham (2)	Robert Morris	12–4	1st	22–8	NEC Champions; NCAA first round	
1990–91	Rich Zvosec	St. Francis (NY)	8–8	T-5th	15–14		
1991–92	Tim Capstraw	Wagner	9–7	4th	16–12		
1992–93	Kevin Bannon	Rider	14–4	1st	19–11	NEC Champions; NCAA first round	
1992–93	Jim Phelan	Mount St. Mary's	10–8	T-3rd	14–16		
1993–94	Kevin Bannon (2)	Rider	14–4	1st	21–9	NEC Champions; NCAA first round	
1994–95	Dave Magarity (2)	Marist	12–6	T-2nd	17–11		
1995–96	Jim Phelan (2)	Mount St. Mary's	16–2	1st	21–8	NIT first round	
1996–97	Ray Haskins	Long Island	15–3	1st	21–9	NEC Champions; NCAA first round	
1997–98	Ron Ganulin	St. Francis (NY)	10–6	T-3rd	15–12		
1998–99	Tom Sullivan	UMBC	17–3	1st	19–9		
1999–2000	Howie Dickenman	Central Connecticut	15–3	1st	25–6	NEC Champions; NCAA first round	
2000–01	Dave Calloway	Monmouth	15–5	2nd	21–10	NEC Champions; NCAA first round	
2001–02	Howie Dickenman (2)	Central Connecticut	19–1	1st	26–5	NEC Champions; NCAA first round	
2002–03	Dereck Whittenburg	Wagner	14–4	1st	21–11	NEC Champions; NCAA first round	
2003–04	Ron Ganulin (2)	St. Francis (NY)	12–6	1st	15–3		
2004–05	Jim Ferry	Long Island	10–8	4th	14–15		
2005–06	Howie Dickenman (3)	Central Connecticut	13–5	2nd	18–11		
2006–07	Howie Dickenman (4)	Central Connecticut	16–2	1st	22–12	NEC Champions; NCAA first round	
2007–08	Mike Rice Jr.	Robert Morris	15–3	1st	24–11	NEC Champions; NCAA first round	
2008–09	Mike Rice Jr. (2)	Robert Morris	15–3	1st	23–12	NEC Champions; NCAA first round	
2009–10	Tom Moore	Quinnipiac	15–3	1st	23–10	NIT first round	
2010–11	Jim Ferry (2)	Long Island	16–2	1st	27–6	NEC Champions; NCAA second round	
2011–12	Glenn Braica	St. Francis Brooklyn	12–6	4th	15–15		
2012–13	Tim O'Shea	Bryant	12–6	T-2nd	19–11	CBI first round	
2013–14	Andrew Toole	Robert Morris	14–2	1st	22–14	NIT second round	
2014–15	Glenn Braica (2)	St. Francis Brooklyn	15–3	1st	23–12	NIT first round	
2015–16	Bashir Mason	Wagner	13–5	1st	23–11	NIT second round	
2016–17	Jamion Christian	Mount St. Mary's	14–4	1st	20–16	NEC Champions; NCAA first round	
2017–18	Bashir Mason (2)	Wagner	14–4	1st	23–10	NIT first round	
2018–19	Rob Krimmel	Saint Francis (PA)	12–6	T-1st	18–15	NIT first round	
2019–20	Joe Gallo	Merrimack	14–4	1st	20–11	NEC Regular-Season Champions (Note: Because Merrimack was in the first season of its four-year transition from NCAA Division II to Division I, it was not eligible for NCAA-sponsored postseason play (either the NCAA Tournament or NIT), and under NEC rules was also ineligible for the conference tournament. The Warriors were eligible to compete in non-NCAA postseason events, but all postseason play was canceled due to the COVID-19 pandemic.)	
2020–21	Bashir Mason (3)	Wagner	13–5	1st	13–7		
2021–22	Jared Grasso	Bryant	16–2	1st	22–10	NEC Champions; NCAA First Four	
2022–23	Chris Kraus	Stonehill	10–6	T-2nd	14–17	(Note: Because Stonehill was in the first season of its four-year transition from NCAA Division II to Division I, it was not eligible for NCAA-sponsored postseason play (either the NCAA Tournament or NIT), and under NEC rules was also ineligible for the conference tournament.)	
2023–24	Patrick Sellers	Central Connecticut	13–3	T-1st	20–11	NEC semifinals	
2024–25	Patrick Sellers (2)	Central Connecticut	14–2	1st	25–7	NEC runner-up	
2025–26	Rod Strickland	LIU	15–3	1st	TBD	TBD	

== Winners by school ==
Years in this table reflect calendar years in which basketball seasons end. Since the basketball season spans two calendar years, each school's first year of membership in this table is the calendar year after its actual arrival in the conference.

School (NEC participation)	Winners	Years
Robert Morris (1982–2020)	6	1983, 1989, 1990, 2008, 2009, 2014
Central Connecticut (1997–present)	6	2000, 2002, 2006, 2007, 2024, 2025
St. Francis Brooklyn (1982–2023)	5	1991, 1998, 2004, 2012, 2015
Wagner (1982–present)	5	1992, 2003, 2016, 2018, 2021
LIU (1982–present) (Note: From 1981 to 2019, Long Island University was represented in the Northeast Conference by its Brooklyn campus, known for athletic purposes as "Long Island" through the 2012–13 season and "LIU Brooklyn" from 2013–14 forward. After the 2018–19 season, LIU merged the athletic programs of its Brooklyn and Post campuses into a single program, now competing as the LIU Sharks, that inherited the NCAA Division I and Northeast Conference memberships of the Brooklyn campus.)	4	1997, 2005, 2011, 2026
Mount St. Mary's (1989–2022)	3	1993, 1996, 2017
Fairleigh Dickinson (1982–present)	2	1985, 1986
Marist (1981–1997)	2	1987, 1995
Monmouth (1985–2013)	2	1988, 2001
Rider (1992–1997)	2	1993, 1994
Bryant (2008–2022)	2	2013, 2022
Loyola (1981–1989)	1	1984
Merrimack (2020–present)	1	2020
Quinnipiac (1998–2013)	1	2010
Saint Francis (1982–2026) (Note: Saint Francis will leave after the 2025–26 season to start a transition to NCAA Division III as a new member of the Presidents' Athletic Conference.)	1	2019
Stonehill (2022–present)	1	2023
Le Moyne (2024–present)	0	—
Sacred Heart (1999–present)	0	—
