= 1989 Northeast Conference men's basketball tournament =

- Classification: Division I
- Season: 1988–89
- Teams: 6
- Finals site: Charles L. Sewall Center; Moon Township, PA
- Champions: Robert Morris (3rd title)
- Winning coach: Jarrett Durham (1st title)
- MVP: Vaughn Luton (Robert Morris)

The 1989 Northeast Conference men's basketball tournament was held February 28-March 3, 1989. The tournament featured the top six teams from the 9-team conference. Robert Morris won their third ECAC Metro/NEC championship, and received the conference's automatic bid to the 1989 NCAA tournament.

1988–89 Northeast Conference men's basketball standings
	Conf.				Overall
Team	W		L	PCT	W		L	PCT
Robert Morris†	12	–	4	.750	21	–	9	.700
Fairleigh Dickinson	11	–	5	.688	17	–	12	.586
Marist*	9	–	7	.563	13	–	15	.464
Monmouth	9	–	7	.563	15	–	13	.536
Long Island	7	–	9	.438	9	–	19	.321
Loyola (MD)	7	–	9	.438	10	–	18	.357
Saint Francis (PA)	6	–	10	.375	13	–	16	.448
Wagner	6	–	10	.375	11	–	16	.407
St. Francis (NY)	5	–	11	.313	11	–	16	.407
† 1989 NEC tournament winner Rankings from AP Poll *Ineligible for conference tournament

== Format ==
The NEC Men’s Basketball Tournament consisted of a six-team playoff format with all games played at the venue of the higher seed. The top two seeds received a bye in the first round.

== Bracket ==
First round
5	Loyola (MD)	66
4	Long Island	79
3	Monmouth	89
6	Saint Francis (PA)	95

Semifinals
1	Robert Morris	63
4	Long Island	52
6	Saint Francis (PA)	64
2	Fairleigh Dickinson	74

Championship Game
1	Robert Morris	67
2	Fairleigh Dickinson	66
