= 1990–91 Saint Francis Red Flash men's basketball team =

American college basketball season

1990–91 Saint Francis Red Flash men's basketball

NEC Regular Season champion NEC tournament champion

NCAA tournament
- Conference: Northeast Conference
- Record: 24–8 (13–3 NEC)
- Head coach: Jim Baron (4th season)
- Home arena: DeGol Arena

1990–91 Northeast Conference men's basketball standings
	Conf.				Overall
Team	W		L	PCT	W		L	PCT
Saint Francis (PA)†	13	–	3	.813	24	–	8	.750
Fairleigh Dickinson	13	–	3	.813	22	–	9	.710
Robert Morris*	12	–	4	.750	17	–	11	.607
Monmouth	10	–	6	.625	19	–	8	.704
St. Francis (NY)	8	–	8	.500	15	–	14	.517
Mount St. Mary's*	6	–	10	.375	8	–	19	.296
Long Island	4	–	12	.250	10	–	18	.357
Marist	4	–	12	.250	6	–	22	.214
Wagner	2	–	14	.125	4	–	26	.133
† 1991 NEC tournament winner Rankings from AP Poll; *Ineligible for conference tournament

The 1990–91 Saint Francis Red Flash men's basketball team represented Saint Francis University during the 1990–91 NCAA Division I men's basketball season. The Red Flash, led by fourth-year head coach Jim Baron, played their home games at the DeGol Arena and were members of the Northeast Conference. They finished the season 24–8, 13–3 in NEC play to finish in a tie for first place. They won the Northeast Conference tournament, their first, to advance to a play-in game against Fordham, which they also won, to secure a bid to the NCAA tournament. The Red Flash fell in the opening round to Lute Olson's Arizona Wildcats. Until 2025, this is their only NCAA tournament appearance.

== Roster ==
1990–91 Saint Francis Red Flash men's basketball team
Players	Coaches
Pos. / # / Name / Height / Weight / Year / Hometown; PG / / Mike Iuzzolino / 5 ft 10 in (1.78 m) / — / Sr	Head coach: Jim Baron; Assistant coach(es) Legend: (C) Team captain; (S) Suspended; (I) Ineligible; (W) Walk-on; Injured; Current redshirt

== Schedule ==
Date time, TV	Rank^{#}	Opponent^{#}	Result	Record	Site (attendance) city, state
Regular season
Nov 23, 1990*		Niagara	W 90–72	1–0	DeGol Arena; Loretto, Pennsylvania
Dec 1, 1990*		No. 13 Pittsburgh	L 85–91	1–1	DeGol Arena; Loretto, Pennsylvania
Dec 3, 1990*		Liberty	W 73–72	2–1	DeGol Arena; Loretto, Pennsylvania
Jan 10, 1991; 7:30 pm		Marist	W 75–69		DeGol Arena; Loretto, Pennsylvania
Feb 7, 1991; 8:00 pm		Marist	W 83–67		
NEC Tournament
Feb 28, 1991*		St. Francis (NY); Semifinal	W 96–70	22–7	DeGol Arena (2,663); Loretto, Pennsylvania
Mar 2, 1991*		Fairleigh Dickinson; Championship Game	W 97–82	23–7	DeGol Arena (3,517); Loretto, Pennsylvania
NCAA Tournament
Mar 6, 1991*		Fordham; Play-in Game	W 70–64	24–7	DeGol Arena (3,500); Loretto, Pennsylvania
Mar 14, 1991*	(15 W)	vs. (2 W) No. 8 Arizona; First Round	L 80–93	24–8	Jon M. Huntsman Center; Salt Lake City, Utah
*Non-conference game. ^{#}Rankings from AP Poll. (#) Tournament seedings in parentheses. W=West. All times are in Eastern Time.

== Awards and honors ==
- Mike Iuzzolino – NEC Player of the Year

== Team players in the 1991 NBA draft ==
Round	Pick	Player	NBA Club
2	35	Mike Iuzzolino	Dallas Mavericks
