= 1990 Northeast Conference men's basketball tournament =

- Classification: Division I
- Season: 1989–90
- Teams: 6
- Finals site: Charles L. Sewall Center; Moon Township, PA
- Champions: Robert Morris (4th title)
- Winning coach: Jarrett Durham (2nd title)
- MVP: Alex Blackwell (Monmouth)

The 1990 Northeast Conference men's basketball tournament was held February 27-March 1, 1990. The tournament featured the top six teams from the 9-team conference. Robert Morris won their second consecutive and fourth overall ECAC Metro/NEC tournament championship, and received the conference's automatic bid to the 1990 NCAA tournament.

1989–90 Northeast Conference men's basketball standings
	Conf.				Overall
Team	W		L	PCT	W		L	PCT
Robert Morris†	12	–	4	.750	22	–	8	.733
Monmouth	11	–	5	.688	17	–	12	.586
Marist	10	–	6	.625	17	–	11	.607
Mount St. Mary's*	10	–	6	.625	16	–	12	.571
Saint Francis (PA)	10	–	6	.625	17	–	11	.607
Fairleigh Dickinson	8	–	8	.500	16	–	13	.552
Wagner	6	–	10	.375	11	–	17	.393
St. Francis (NY)	4	–	12	.250	9	–	18	.333
Long Island	1	–	15	.063	3	–	23	.115
† 1990 NEC tournament winner Rankings from AP Poll; *Ineligible for conference tournament

== Format ==
The NEC Men’s Basketball Tournament consisted of a six-team playoff format with all games played at the venue of the higher seed. The top two seeds received a bye in the first round.

== Bracket ==
First round
4	Saint Francis (PA)	62
5	Fairleigh Dickinson	65
3	Marist	63
6	Wagner	69

Semifinals
1	Robert Morris	78
5	Fairleigh Dickinson	58
6	Wagner	50
2	Monmouth	71

Championship Game
1	Robert Morris	71
2	Monmouth	66
