= 1991 Northeast Conference men's basketball tournament =

- Classification: Division I
- Season: 1990–91
- Teams: 7
- Finals site: Maurice Stokes Athletic Center; Loretto, PA
- Champions: Saint Francis (PA) (1st title)
- Winning coach: Jim Baron (1st title)
- MVP: Mike Iuzzolino (SFPA)

The 1991 Northeast Conference men's basketball tournament was held in March. The tournament featured seven teams; two teams, Mount St. Mary's and Robert Morris, were ineligible to participate. Robert Morris was penalized by the NCAA for institutional misconduct. Saint Francis (PA) won the championship, their first, and as of 2022, only tournament title. They advanced to a play-in game against Fordham, which they won to advance to the 1991 NCAA tournament.

1990–91 Northeast Conference men's basketball standings
| | Conf. | | | | Overall |
| Team | W | | L | PCT | W | | L | PCT |
|---|---|---|---|---|---|---|---|---|
| Saint Francis (PA)† | 13 | – | 3 | .813 | 24 | – | 8 | .750 |
| Fairleigh Dickinson | 13 | – | 3 | .813 | 22 | – | 9 | .710 |
| Robert Morris* | 12 | – | 4 | .750 | 17 | – | 11 | .607 |
| Monmouth | 10 | – | 6 | .625 | 19 | – | 8 | .704 |
| St. Francis (NY) | 8 | – | 8 | .500 | 15 | – | 14 | .517 |
| Mount St. Mary's* | 6 | – | 10 | .375 | 8 | – | 19 | .296 |
| Long Island | 4 | – | 12 | .250 | 10 | – | 18 | .357 |
| Marist | 4 | – | 12 | .250 | 6 | – | 22 | .214 |
| Wagner | 2 | – | 14 | .125 | 4 | – | 26 | .133 |
† 1991 NEC tournament winner Rankings from AP Poll; *Ineligible for conference tournament

== Format ==
The NEC Men's Basketball Tournament consisted of a seven-team playoff format with all games played at the venue of the higher seed. The first seed received a bye in the first round.

== Bracket ==
First round
4 | St. Francis Brooklyn | 95
5 | Long Island | 80
3 | Monmouth | 81
6 | Marist | 67
2 | Fairleigh Dickinson | 94
7 | Wagner | 68

Semifinals
1 | Saint Francis (PA) | 96
4 | St. Francis Brooklyn | 70
2 | Fairleigh Dickinson | 78
3 | Monmouth | 67^{OT}

Championship Game
1 | Saint Francis (PA) | 97
2 | Fairleigh Dickinson | 82

== All-tournament team ==
Tournament MVP in bold.

**1991 NEC All-Tournament Team**

**Mike Iuzzolino**, SFPA
Joe Anderson, SFPA
Alex Blackwell, MU
Desi Wilson, FDU
Mel Hawkins, FDU
John Hilvert, SFPA
