= 1988–89 St. Francis Terriers men's basketball team =

American college basketball season

1988–89 St. Francis Terriers men's basketball
- Conference: Northeast Conference
- Record: 11–16 (5–11 NEC)
- Head coach: Rich Zvosec (1st season)
- Home arena: Generoso Pope Athletic Complex

1988–89 Northeast Conference men's basketball standings
	Conf.				Overall
Team	W		L	PCT	W		L	PCT
Robert Morris†	12	–	4	.750	21	–	9	.700
Fairleigh Dickinson	11	–	5	.688	17	–	12	.586
Marist*	9	–	7	.563	13	–	15	.464
Monmouth	9	–	7	.563	15	–	13	.536
Long Island	7	–	9	.438	9	–	19	.321
Loyola (MD)	7	–	9	.438	10	–	18	.357
Saint Francis (PA)	6	–	10	.375	13	–	16	.448
Wagner	6	–	10	.375	11	–	16	.407
St. Francis (NY)	5	–	11	.313	11	–	16	.407
† 1989 NEC tournament winner Rankings from AP Poll *Ineligible for conference tournament

The 1988–89 St. Francis Terriers men's basketball team represented St. Francis College during the 1988–89 NCAA Division I men's basketball season. The team was coached by Rich Zvosec, who was in his first year at the helm of the St. Francis Terriers. The Terrier's home games were played at the Generoso Pope Athletic Complex. The team has been a member of the Northeast Conference since 1981.

The Terriers finished their season at 11–16 overall and 5–11 in conference play.

== Roster ==
1988–89 St. Francis Brooklyn Terriers men's basketball team
Players
Coaches

Pos.	#	Name	Height	Weight	Year	Hometown
F		Darwin Purdie	6 ft 6 in (1.98 m)	—	Sr	Wilmington, Delaware
G		Rodney Henry	6 ft 0 in (1.83 m)	—	Sr
F		Juan Jorge	6 ft 4 in (1.93 m)	—	Sr
G		Chris Palermo	6 ft 2 in (1.88 m)	—	Sr
F		Anthony Robinson	6 ft 6 in (1.98 m)	—	Jr
F		Steve Mickens	6 ft 6 in (1.98 m)	—	Jr
G		John Flannigan	5 ft 11 in (1.8 m)	—	Jr
G		Kevin Israel	5 ft 8 in (1.73 m)	—	So
G		John Szymczyk	6 ft 2 in (1.88 m)	—	So
C		Jimmy Guy	6 ft 11 in (2.11 m)	—	So
G		John Arnold	5 ft 8 in (1.73 m)	—	Fr
G		Steve Canicato	5 ft 11 in (1.8 m)	—	Fr

Head coach

- Rich Zvosec (Defiance '83)

Assistant coach(es)

Legend

- (C) Team captain
- (S) Suspended
- (I) Ineligible
- (W) Walk-on
- Injured
- Current redshirt

== Schedule and results ==
Date time, TV	Opponent	Result	Record	Site (attendance) city, state
Regular Season
November __, 1988*	Winthrop	W 58–56	1–0	Generoso Pope Athletic Complex (750); Brooklyn, NY
November __, 1988	at Wagner	L 85–86	1–1 (0–1)	Sutter Gymnasium (501); Staten Island, NY
December __, 1988*	Morgan State	W 74–68	2–1	Generoso Pope Athletic Complex (1,231); Brooklyn, NY
December __, 1988*	Pratt Institute	W 114–33	3–1	Generoso Pope Athletic Complex (150); Brooklyn, NY
December 13, 1988*	at Wright State	L 74–75	3–2	Nutter Center (2,026); Fairborn, OH
December __, 1988*	at Dartmouth	L 92–103	3–3	Leede Arena (1,225); Hanover, NH
December __, 1988*	vs. U.S. International	W 92–78	4–3	Leede Arena (250); Hanover, NH
December __, 1988*	Medgar Evers	W 100–54	5–3	Generoso Pope Athletic Complex (350); Brooklyn, NY
December __, 1988*	at San Diego State	L 72–91	5–4	Peterson Gym (1,964); San Diego, CA
December __, 1988*	at U.S. International	L 77–95	5–5	(316)
December __, 1988*	at Southern Utah State	L 58–109	5–6	Centrum Arena (2,009); Cedar City, UT
January , 1989	Loyola (MD)	L 83–86	5–7 (0–2)	Generoso Pope Athletic Complex (1,223); Brooklyn, NY
January __, 1989	at Fairleigh Dickinson	L 64–71	5–8 (0–3)	Rothman Center (1,217); Hackensack, NJ
January __, 1989	at Saint Francis (PA)	L 68–90	5–9 (0–4)	Maurice Stokes Athletic Center (1,153); Loretto, PA
January __, 1989	at Robert Morris	L 56–86	5–10 (0–5)	Charles L. Sewall Center (600); Moon Township, PA
January __, 1989*	Brooklyn	W 68–55	6–10	Generoso Pope Athletic Complex (523); Brooklyn, NY
January 25, 1989	Monmouth	L 47–57	6–11 (0–6)	Generoso Pope Athletic Complex (351); Brooklyn, NY
January __, 1989	Wagner	L 83–84 ^{OT}	6–12 (0–7)	Generoso Pope Athletic Complex (528); Brooklyn, NY
February , 1989	at Long Island	L 96–102	6–13 (0–8)	Schwartz Athletic Center (301); Brooklyn, NY
February __, 1989	Marist	W 87–78	7–13 (1–8)	Generoso Pope Athletic Complex (764); Brooklyn, NY
February __, 1989	Fairleigh Dickinson	W 73–71	8–13 (2–8)	Generoso Pope Athletic Complex (563); Brooklyn, NY
February 6, 1989	at Monmouth	L 58–82	8–14 (2–9)	William T. Boylan Gymnasium (351); West Long Branch, NJ
February __, 1989	at Marist	W 82–77	9–14 (3–9)	McCann Field House (2,718); Poughkeepsie, NY
February , 1989	at Loyola (MD)	L 82–88	9–15 (3–10)	Reitz Arena (952); Baltimore, MD
February 20, 1989	Long Island; Battle of Brooklyn	L 77–79 ^{OT}	9–16 (3–11)	Generoso Pope Athletic Complex (754); Brooklyn, NY
February __, 1989	Saint Francis (PA)	W 74–60	10–16 (4–11)	Generoso Pope Athletic Complex (1,032); Brooklyn, NY
February __, 1989	Robert Morris	W 72–71	11–16 (5–11)	Generoso Pope Athletic Complex (643); Brooklyn, NY
*Non-conference game. ^{#}Rankings from AP Poll. (#) Tournament seedings in parentheses. All times are in Eastern Time.
