= 1989–90 St. Francis Terriers men's basketball team =

American college basketball season

1989–90 St. Francis Terriers men's basketball
- Conference: Northeast Conference
- Record: 9–18 (4–12 NEC)
- Head coach: Rich Zvosec (2nd season)
- Assistant coach: Glenn Braica (1st season)
- Home arena: Generoso Pope Athletic Complex

1989–90 Northeast Conference men's basketball standings
	Conf.				Overall
Team	W		L	PCT	W		L	PCT
Robert Morris†	12	–	4	.750	22	–	8	.733
Monmouth	11	–	5	.688	17	–	12	.586
Marist	10	–	6	.625	17	–	11	.607
Mount St. Mary's*	10	–	6	.625	16	–	12	.571
Saint Francis (PA)	10	–	6	.625	17	–	11	.607
Fairleigh Dickinson	8	–	8	.500	16	–	13	.552
Wagner	6	–	10	.375	11	–	17	.393
St. Francis (NY)	4	–	12	.250	9	–	18	.333
Long Island	1	–	15	.063	3	–	23	.115
† 1990 NEC tournament winner Rankings from AP Poll; *Ineligible for conference tournament

The 1989–90 St. Francis Terriers men's basketball team represented St. Francis College during the 1989–90 NCAA Division I men's basketball season. The team was coached by Rich Zvosec, who was in his second year at the helm of the St. Francis Terriers. The Terrier's home games were played at the Generoso Pope Athletic Complex. The team has been a member of the Northeast Conference since 1981.

The Terriers finished their season at 9–18 overall and 4–12 in conference play.

== Roster ==
1989–90 St. Francis Brooklyn Terriers men's basketball team
Players
Coaches

Pos.	#	Name	Height	Weight	Year	Hometown
F		Steve Mickens	6 ft 6 in (1.98 m)	—	Sr
F		Anthony Robinson	6 ft 6 in (1.98 m)	—	Sr
G		John Flannigan	5 ft 11 in (1.8 m)	—	Sr
C		Jim Hynes	6 ft 7 in (2.01 m)	—	Sr
C		Terryl Coombs	6 ft 6 in (1.98 m)	—	Jr
G		Kevin Israel	5 ft 8 in (1.73 m)	—	Jr
G		John Szymczyk	6 ft 2 in (1.88 m)	—	Jr
G		John Arnold	5 ft 8 in (1.73 m)	—	So
G		Steve Canicato	5 ft 11 in (1.8 m)	—	So
C		Thomas Johnson	6 ft 11 in (2.11 m)	—	So
G		Louis Myers	6 ft 2 in (1.88 m)	—	Fr

Head coach

- Rich Zvosec (Defiance '83)

Assistant coach(es)

- Glenn Braica (Queens College '89)

Legend

- (C) Team captain
- (S) Suspended
- (I) Ineligible
- (W) Walk-on
- Injured
- Current redshirt

== Schedule and results ==
Date time, TV	Opponent	Result	Record	Site (attendance) city, state
Regular Season
November __, 1989*	at Columbia	W 78–75	1–0	Levien Gymnasium (400); Manhattan, NY
November __, 1989*	at Winthrop	L 90–92	1–1	Winthrop Coliseum (594); Rock Hill, SC
December __, 1989*	at Morgan State	L 78–91	1–2	Talmadge L. Hill Field House (3,225); Baltimore, MD
December __, 1989*	at Eastern Michigan	L 85–107	1–3	Bowen Field House (1,800); Ypsilanti, MI
December __, 1989*	at Bethune-Cookman	W 97–93	2–3	Moore Gymnasium (2,000); Daytona Beach, FL
December 13, 1989*	Wright State	L 80–94	2–4	Generoso Pope Athletic Complex (2,450); Brooklyn, NY
December __, 1989*	Niagara	L 69–83	2–5	Generoso Pope Athletic Complex (1,108); Brooklyn, NY
December __, 1989*	at Brooklyn	W 76–69	3–5	(300); Brooklyn, NY
January 4, 1990*	at Wright State	L 82–101	3–6	Nutter Center (2,756); Fairborn, OH
January 6, 1990	at Long Island; Battle of Brooklyn	W 74–63	4–6 (1–0)	Schwartz Athletic Center (300); Brooklyn, NY
January __, 1990	Robert Morris	L 70–74	4–7 (1–1)	Generoso Pope Athletic Complex (320); Brooklyn, NY
January __, 1990	Saint Francis (PA)	L 71–80	4–8 (1–2)	Generoso Pope Athletic Complex (550); Brooklyn, NY
January __, 1990*	Concordia	W 69–67	5–8	Generoso Pope Athletic Complex (200); Brooklyn, NY
January 18, 1990	Monmouth	L 62–72	5–9 (1–3)	Generoso Pope Athletic Complex (730); Brooklyn, NY
January __, 1990	at Mount St. Mary's	L 69–71	5–10 (1–4)	Knott Arena (2,550); Emmitsburg, MD
January __, 1990	Wagner	L 59–62	5–11 (1–5)	Generoso Pope Athletic Complex (350); Brooklyn, NY
January __, 1990	at Fairleigh Dickinson	W 65–63	6–11 (2–5)	Rothman Center (2,250); Hackensack, NJ
January __, 1990	at Marist	L 71–90	6–12 (2–6)	McCann Field House (2,845); Poughkeepsie, NY
January __, 1990	Marist	L 73–92	6–13 (2–7)	Generoso Pope Athletic Complex (390); Brooklyn, NY
February __, 1990	Long Island	W 77–74	7–13 (3–7)	Generoso Pope Athletic Complex (250); Brooklyn, NY
February __, 1989	at Saint Francis (PA)	L 65–92	7–14 (3–8)	Maurice Stokes Athletic Center (1,500); Loretto, PA
February __, 1990	Robert Morris	L 55–71	7–15 (3–9)	Charles L. Sewall Center (974); Moon Township, PA
February __, 1989	Mount St. Mary's	L 85–94	7–16 (3–10)	Generoso Pope Athletic Complex (250); Brooklyn, NY
February __, 1990	at Wagner	W 82–78	8–16 (4–10)	Sutter Gymnasium (614); Brooklyn, NY
February 17, 1990	at Monmouth	L 58–77	8–17 (4–11)	William T. Boylan Gymnasium (2,300); West Long Branch, NJ
February __, 1990	Fairleigh Dickinson	L 57–89	8–18 (4–12)	Generoso Pope Athletic Complex (400); Brooklyn, NY
February __, 1990*	Brooklyn	W 101–88	9–18	Generoso Pope Athletic Complex (300); Brooklyn, NY
*Non-conference game. ^{#}Rankings from AP Poll. (#) Tournament seedings in parentheses. All times are in Eastern Time.
