= Tim Capstraw =

Color commentator

Biographical details
- Born: September 14, 1960 (age 66); Utica, New York, U.S.
- Education: Wagner College

Coaching career (HC unless noted)

Basketball
- 1985–89 1989–99: Siena (Asst.); Wagner

Baseball
- 1984–85: Wagner

Head coaching record
- Overall: 117–164 (Basketball); 21–30–3 (Baseball)

Accomplishments and honors

Awards
- Northeast Conference Men's Basketball Coach of the Year (1992)

Tim Capstraw (born September 14, 1960), nicknamed The Capper, is a color commentator for the Brooklyn Nets and NBA TV. Prior to becoming a sportscaster, Capstraw was the head basketball coach at Wagner College from 1989 to 1999.

== Coaching ==
Capstraw was born and raised Utica, New York and graduated from the Utica Free Academy. He graduated from Wagner College in 1982 and the following year, at only 23 years old, he became the school's head baseball coach. In 1985 he became a basketball assistant at Siena College.

In 1989, Capstraw returned to Wagner as head basketball coach. At the age of 29, he was the youngest coach in Division I. At Wagner, Capstraw had a 117–164 record and no NCAA tournament or NIT bids. He was the 1992 Northeast Conference Men's Basketball Coach of the Year.

== Broadcasting ==
Capstraw's broadcasting career began with a three-year stint as a television and radio analyst for the Northeast Conference. During the 2001–02 season he was a television analyst for the Atlantic 10 Conference. He joined the Nets Radio broadcasts in the 2002-03 NBA season. He has also filled in on YES Network's Nets telecasts.

In addition to his work on Nets broadcasts, Capstraw serves as NBA TV's lead analyst for their Euroleague broadcasts and several other international championships, including the 2004 FIBA Diamond Ball Tournament, the 2003 EuroBasket tournament, and the 2003 FIBA Asia Championship. In 2006, he worked on NBA TV's coverage of the Las Vegas Summer League. He was a color commentator for NBC's basketball coverage at the 2012 Summer Olympics.
