= Chad Timberlake =

American basketball coach and player

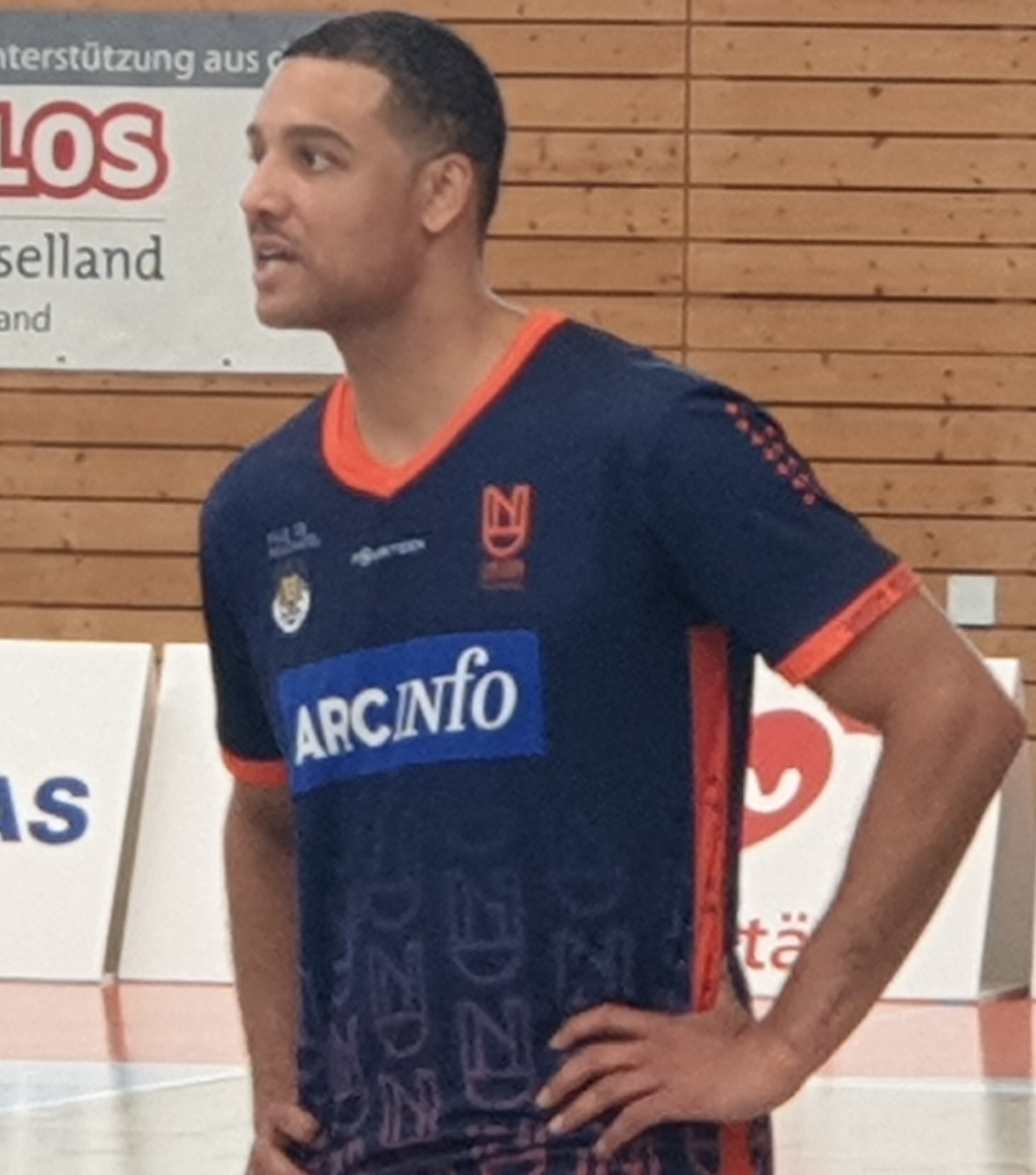
- Timberlake with Neuchâtel in 2021

Pully Lausanne Foxes
- Title: Head coach
- League: Swiss Basketball League

Personal information
- Born: January 1, 1984 (age 42) Wiesbaden, Germany
- Listed height: 6 ft 4 in (1.93 m)
- Listed weight: 210 lb (95 kg)

Career information
- High school: New Utrecht (Brooklyn, New York)
- College: Fairleigh Dickinson (2002–2006)
- NBA draft: 2006: undrafted
- Playing career: 2006–2021
- Position: Shooting guard
- Number: 8
- Coaching career: 2021–present

Career history

Playing
- 2006–2007: Nový Jičín
- 2007–2008: Albany Patroons
- 2008–2009: Sokol Znicz
- 2010: ZTE
- 2010–2011: Elitzur Yavne
- 2011–2012: Falco KC Szombathely
- 2012–2013: Mitteldeutscher BC
- 2013–2014: Falco KC Szombathely
- 2014–2015: Crailsheim Merlins
- 2015: Lukoil Academic
- 2016: Montey
- 2016–2017: Lions de Genève
- 2017–2019: Fribourg Olympic
- 2019–2021: Monthey-Chablais
- 2021–2022: Union Neuchâtel

Coaching
- 2021–2025: Union Neuchâtel (assistant)
- 2025–2026: Union Neuchâtel
- 2026–present: Pully Lausanne Foxes

Career highlights
- Swiss League champion (2018); 2× Swiss Cup winner (2017, 2018); SBL Cup winner (2018); Hungarian League champion (2010); Hungarian Cup winner (2010); Hungarian League All-Star (2012); Polish League All-Star (2009); AP Honorable mention All-American (2006); NEC Player of the Year (2006); First-team All-NEC (2006); NEC All-Rookie Team (2003)

Chad Timberlake (born January 1, 1984) is an American basketball coach and former player. He is currently serving as the head coach with Pully Lausanne Foxes of the Swiss Basketball League. He played college basketball for the Fairleigh Dickinson Knights, where in 2006 he was named the Northeast Conference Player of the Year.

== College career ==
Born in Wiesbaden, Germany, Timberlake came to Fairleigh Dickinson from New Utrecht High School in Brooklyn. In his first season he came off the bench to average 6.2 points and 2.7 assists per game, earning Northeast Conference All-Rookie team honors. He moved into the starting lineup for his remaining three years, helping lead the team to an NCAA Tournament berth as a junior. He earned NEC Player of the Year unanimously as a senior during the 2005–06 season after averaging 15.2 points, 5.5 rebounds and 4.7 assists per game and leading the Knights to a conference regular season championship.

== Professional career ==
Timberlake was not drafted in the 2006 NBA draft. He has played professionally in several countries before settling in Switzerland since 2016. He signed with BBC Monthey of the Swiss Basketball League after stints with Lions de Genève and Fribourg Olympic.

== Coaching career ==
In August 2021, immediately after his retirement, Timberlake signed as assistant coach of Union Neuchâtel. In 2021-22, he served as playing-assistant coach. In September 2025, he was promoted to head coach, after having served as interim coach since the previous month. Timberlake led the Neuchâtel team to the Swiss play-off quarter finals in 2025-26. In June 2026, he became the next head coach of the Pully Lausanne Foxes.
