= 1990–91 St. Francis Terriers men's basketball team =

American college basketball season

1990–91 St. Francis Terriers men's basketball
- Conference: Northeast Conference
- Record: 15–14 (8–8 NEC)
- Head coach: Rich Zvosec (3rd season)
- Assistant coach: Glenn Braica (2nd season)
- Home arena: Generoso Pope Athletic Complex

1990–91 Northeast Conference men's basketball standings
	Conf.				Overall
Team	W		L	PCT	W		L	PCT
Saint Francis (PA)†	13	–	3	.813	24	–	8	.750
Fairleigh Dickinson	13	–	3	.813	22	–	9	.710
Robert Morris*	12	–	4	.750	17	–	11	.607
Monmouth	10	–	6	.625	19	–	8	.704
St. Francis (NY)	8	–	8	.500	15	–	14	.517
Mount St. Mary's*	6	–	10	.375	8	–	19	.296
Long Island	4	–	12	.250	10	–	18	.357
Marist	4	–	12	.250	6	–	22	.214
Wagner	2	–	14	.125	4	–	26	.133
† 1991 NEC tournament winner Rankings from AP Poll; *Ineligible for conference tournament

The 1990–91 St. Francis Terriers men's basketball team represented St. Francis College during the 1990–91 NCAA Division I men's basketball season. The team was coached by Rich Zvosec, who was in his third year at the helm of the St. Francis Terriers. The Terrier's home games were played at the Generoso Pope Athletic Complex. The team has been a member of the Northeast Conference since 1981.

The Terriers finished their season at 15–14 overall and 8–8 in conference play. At the end of the regular season Rich Zvosec was named NEC Coach of the Year and Ron Arnold was named NEC Newcomer of the Year.

Over 29 games, Lester James made 149 field-goals on 215 field-goal attempts, producing a 69.3 field-goal percentage that is 16th all-time in NCAA history.

== Roster ==
1990–91 St. Francis Brooklyn Terriers men's basketball team
Players
Coaches

Pos.	#	Name	Height	Weight	Year	Previous school	Hometown
F		Kent Bayant	6 ft 6 in (1.98 m)	—	Sr
G		Kevin Israel	5 ft 8 in (1.73 m)	—	Sr
G		Eric Cheers	6 ft 5 in (1.96 m)	—	Jr
C		Lester James	6 ft 7 in (2.01 m)	—	Jr
G		Lynn Smith	6 ft 3 in (1.91 m)	—	Jr
G		John Arnold	6 ft 0 in (1.83 m)	—	Jr
F		Brian Jones	6 ft 4 in (1.93 m)	—	Jr
F		Allen West	6 ft 5 in (1.96 m)	—	Jr
G		Steve Canicato	6 ft 0 in (1.83 m)	—	Jr
C		Thomas Johnson	6 ft 11 in (2.11 m)	—	Jr
F		Ron Arnold	6 ft 6 in (1.98 m)	—	So	Rice High School	New York, NY
G		Louis Myers	6 ft 2 in (1.88 m)	—	So
C		Nerim Gjonbala	6 ft 8 in (2.03 m)	—	So

Head coach

- Rich Zvosec (Defiance '83)

Assistant coach(es)

- Glenn Braica (Queens College '89)

Legend

- (C) Team captain
- (S) Suspended
- (I) Ineligible
- (W) Walk-on
- Injured
- Current redshirt

== Schedule and results ==
Date time, TV	Opponent	Result	Record	Site (attendance) city, state
Regular season
November __, 1990*	at Maryland Eastern Shore	L 75–81	0–1	J. Millard Tawes Gym (100); Princess Anne, MD
November __, 1990*	Columbia	L 82–88	0–2	Generoso Pope Athletic Complex (200); Brooklyn, NY
November __, 1990*	Maryland Eastern Shore	W 84–64	1–2	Generoso Pope Athletic Complex (200); Brooklyn, NY
November __, 1990*	Liberty	W 63–50	2–2	Generoso Pope Athletic Complex (200); Brooklyn, NY
December __, 1990*	Brooklyn	W 75–66	3–2	Generoso Pope Athletic Complex (250); Brooklyn, NY
December __, 1990*	at Hofstra	L 74–76	3–3	Hofstra Physical Fitness Center (809); Hempstead, NY
December __, 1990*	Vermont	L 92–94	3–4	Generoso Pope Athletic Complex (250); Brooklyn, NY
December __, 1990	Robert Morris	L 59–82	3–5 (0–1)	Generoso Pope Athletic Complex (609); Brooklyn, NY
December __, 1990	at Saint Francis (PA)	L 88–98	3–6 (0–2)	Maurice Stokes Athletic Center (1,718); Loretto, PA
December __, 1990	at Long Island	W 96–86	4–6 (1–2)	Schwartz Athletic Center (381); Brooklyn, NY
December __, 1990*	at Colgate	W 91–76	5–6	Cotterell Court (253); Hamilton, NY
January __, 1990	Mount St. Mary's	L 81–87	5–7 (1–3)	Generoso Pope Athletic Complex (350); Brooklyn, NY
January 17, 1990	Monmouth	W 84–74	6–7 (2–3)	Generoso Pope Athletic Complex (350); Brooklyn, NY
January __, 1990	Wagner	W 87–71	7–7 (3–3)	Generoso Pope Athletic Complex (300); Brooklyn, NY
January __, 1991	at Fairleigh Dickinson	L 68–83	7–8 (3–4)	Rothman Center (400); Hackensack, NJ
January __, 1991	at Marist	W 80–63	8–8 (4–4)	McCann Field House (2,942); Poughkeepsie, NY
January __, 1991	Saint Francis (PA)	W 105–96	9–8 (5–4)	Generoso Pope Athletic Complex (400); Brooklyn, NY
January __, 1991	Robert Morris	L 66–69	9–9 (5–5)	Generoso Pope Athletic Complex (300); Brooklyn, NY
January __, 1991*	Morgan State	W 86–83	10–9	Generoso Pope Athletic Complex (300); Brooklyn, NY
January __, 1991	at Mount St. Mary's	W 88–77	11–9 (6–5)	Knott Arena (3,000); Emmitsburg, MD
February 9, 1991	Long Island; Battle of Brooklyn	L 115–117 ^{2OT}	11–10 (6–6)	Generoso Pope Athletic Complex (350); Brooklyn, NY
February __, 1991*	at Brooklyn	L 61–74	11–11	(200); Brooklyn, NY
February __, 1991	at Wagner	W 95–90	12–11 (7–6)	Sutter Gymnasium (442); Brooklyn, NY
February 16, 1991	at Monmouth	W 54–52	13–11 (8–6)	William T. Boylan Gymnasium (2,837); West Long Branch, NJ
February __, 1991*	at Liberty	W 71–67	14–11	Vines Center (1,050); Lynchburg, VA
February __, 1991	Marist	L 80–84	14–12 (8–7)	Generoso Pope Athletic Complex (450); Brooklyn, NY
February __, 1991	Fairleigh Dickinson	L 63–78	14–13 (8–8)	Generoso Pope Athletic Complex (400); Brooklyn, NY
1991 NEC tournament
February __, 1991	Long Island; First Round	W 95–80	15–13	Generoso Pope Athletic Complex (600); Brooklyn, NY
February 28, 1991	at Saint Francis (PA); Semifinal	L 70–96	15–14	Maurice Stokes Athletic Center (2,663); Loretto, PA
*Non-conference game. ^{#}Rankings from AP Poll. (#) Tournament seedings in parentheses. All times are in Eastern Time.

== Awards ==
- Ron Arnold

Northeast Conference Newcomer of the Year

Second Team All-Conference pick
