= Darin Smith Jr. =

American college basketball player

No. 4 – Rutgers Scarlet Knights
- Position: Power forward
- Conference: Big Ten Conference

Personal information
- Listed height: 6 ft 7 in (2.01 m)
- Listed weight: 210 lb (95 kg)

Career information
- High school: Vermont Academy (Saxtons River, Vermont)
- College: Central Connecticut (2024–2026); Rutgers (2026–present)

Career highlights
- NEC Player of the Year (2026); First-team All-NEC (2026); NEC All-Rookie Team (2025)

Darin Smith Jr. is an American college basketball player for the Rutgers Scarlet Knights of the Big Ten Conference. He previously played for the Central Connecticut Blue Devils.

== Career ==
Smith attended Vermont Academy in Saxtons River, Vermont. Following his high school career, he committed to play college basketball at Central Connecticut State University.

After redshirting during the 2023–24 season, Smith averaged 6.9 points and 2.0 rebounds per game and was named to the Northeast Conference All-Rookie Team. His production increased the following season, highlighted by a career-high 40-point performance in an 81–76 victory over New Haven. Smith finished the 2025-26 season averaging 20.7 points, 5.4 rebounds, and 1.2 assists per game, being named the NEC Player of the Year. Following the conclusion of the season, he entered the transfer portal.

On April 16, 2026, Smith announced his decision to transfer to Rutgers University–New Brunswick to play for the Rutgers Scarlet Knights.

== Career statistics ==
Legend
GP	Games played	GS	Games started	MPG	Minutes per game
FG%	Field goal percentage	3P%	3-point field goal percentage	FT%	Free throw percentage
RPG	Rebounds per game	APG	Assists per game	SPG	Steals per game
BPG	Blocks per game	PPG	Points per game	**Bold**	Career high

=== College ===
Year	Team	GP	GS	MPG	FG%	3P%	FT%	RPG	APG	SPG	BPG	PPG
2024–25	Central Connecticut	31	1	18.0	.517	.463	.750	3.0	.4	.5	.2	6.8
2025–26	Central Connecticut	30	30	32.6	.456	.376	.898	5.4	1.2	.7	.2	20.7
