= 1989–90 Robert Morris Colonials men's basketball team =

American college basketball season

1989–90 Robert Morris Colonials men's basketball

NEC Regular Season Champions NEC tournament champions

NCAA tournament
- Conference: Northeast Conference
- Record: 22–8 (12–4 NEC)
- Head coach: Jarrett Durham
- Home arena: Charles L. Sewall Center

1989–90 Northeast Conference men's basketball standings
	Conf.				Overall
Team	W		L	PCT	W		L	PCT
Robert Morris†	12	–	4	.750	22	–	8	.733
Monmouth	11	–	5	.688	17	–	12	.586
Marist	10	–	6	.625	17	–	11	.607
Mount St. Mary's*	10	–	6	.625	16	–	12	.571
Saint Francis (PA)	10	–	6	.625	17	–	11	.607
Fairleigh Dickinson	8	–	8	.500	16	–	13	.552
Wagner	6	–	10	.375	11	–	17	.393
St. Francis (NY)	4	–	12	.250	9	–	18	.333
Long Island	1	–	15	.063	3	–	23	.115
† 1990 NEC tournament winner Rankings from AP Poll; *Ineligible for conference tournament

The 1989–90 Robert Morris Colonials men's basketball team represented Robert Morris University in the 1989–90 NCAA Division I basketball season. Robert Morris was coached by Jarrett Durham and played their home games at the Charles L. Sewall Center in Moon Township, Pennsylvania. The Colonials were members of the Northeast Conference. They finished the season 22–8, 12–4 in NEC play. They won the 1990 Northeast Conference men's basketball tournament to earn the conference's automatic bid to the 1990 NCAA Division I men's basketball tournament. They earned a 15 seed in the East Region and played No. 2 seed Kansas in the first round. The Colonials played a tough game, but were beaten 79–71 to end their season.

== Roster ==
1989–90 Robert Morris Colonials men's basketball team
Players	Coaches
Pos. / # / Name / Height / Weight / Year / Hometown; F / / Anthony Dickens / 6 ft 5 in (1.96 m) / — / Sr	Head coach: Jarrett Durham; Assistant coach(es) Legend: (C) Team captain; (S) Suspended; (I) Ineligible; (W) Walk-on; Injured; Current redshirt

== Schedule and results ==
Date time, TV	Rank^{#}	Opponent^{#}	Result	Record	Site (attendance) city, state
Regular season
Dec 4, 1989*		Xavier	L 70–77	2–1	Charles L. Sewall Center; Moon Township, Pennsylvania
Dec 16, 1989*		at Pittsburgh	L 71–88	4–2	Fitzgerald Field House; Pittsburgh, Pennsylvania
Dec 18, 1989*		at Ohio State	L 51–78	4–3	St. John Arena; Columbus, Ohio
NEC tournament
Feb 28, 1990*		Fairleigh Dickinson; NEC Tournament Semifinal	W 78–58	21–7	Charles L. Sewall Center; Moon Township, Pennsylvania
Mar 1, 1990*		Monmouth; NEC tournament championship	W 71–66	22–7	Charles L. Sewall Center; Moon Township, Pennsylvania
NCAA tournament
Mar 16, 1990*	(15 E)	vs. (2 E) No. 5 Kansas; First Round	L 71–79	22–8	Omni Coliseum; Atlanta, Georgia
*Non-conference game. ^{#}Rankings from AP Poll. (#) Tournament seedings in parentheses.

== Awards and honors ==
- Jarrett Durham – NEC Coach of the Year
