= Jim Baron =

American basketball coach (born 1954)

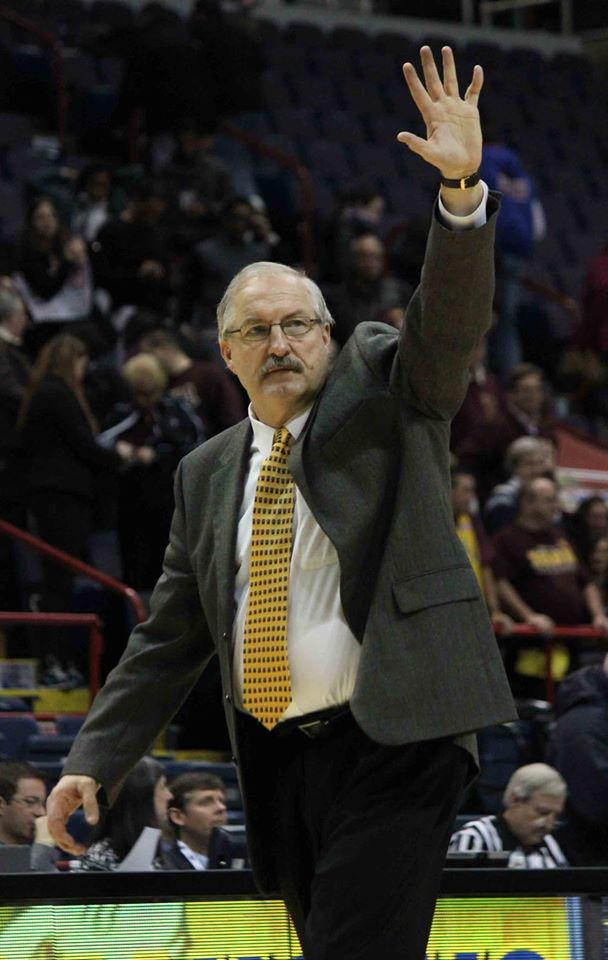

Biographical details
- Born: March 20, 1954 (age 72); Brooklyn, New York, U.S.

Playing career
- 1973–1977: St. Bonaventure
- Position: Guard

Coaching career (HC unless noted)
- 1978–1979: Rochester (assistant)
- 1979–1980: Loyola (MD) (assistant)
- 1980–1981: St. Bonaventure (assistant))
- 1981–1987: Notre Dame (assistant)
- 1987–1992: St. Francis (PA)
- 1992–2001: St. Bonaventure
- 2001–2012: Rhode Island
- 2012–2016: Canisius

Head coaching record
- Overall: 412–397 (.509)

Accomplishments and honors

Championships
- NEC tournament (1991); NEC regular season (1991)

Awards
- 4× Atlantic 10 Coach of the Year (1995, 2003, 2007, 2009)

James Edward Baron (born March 20, 1954) is a retired American college basketball coach. He previously held the position of head coach at Saint Francis University, St. Bonaventure University, the University of Rhode Island and Canisius College.

== Playing career ==
Baron lettered in basketball for four years (1973 to 1977) at St. Bonaventure University and helped St. Bonaventure win the 1977 National Invitation Tournament as a senior. Baron graduated from St. Bonaventure with a degree in physical education in 1977 and later earned a master's degree in counseling from the same institution in 1988.

== Coaching career ==
In 1977, Baron began his coaching career as an assistant coach at Aquinas Institute in Rochester, New York. The following year, Baron became an assistant coach at NCAA Division III University of Rochester. Baron moved up to Division I as an assistant for Loyola College in Maryland for the 1979–80 season. In 1980, Baron returned to his alma mater as assistant coach for St. Bonaventure.

From 1981 to 1987, Baron was an assistant coach at Notre Dame under Digger Phelps. Baron helped Notre Dame make the NCAA Tournaments of 1985, 1986, and 1987 and rank in the season-end top-25 polls in 1986 and 1987.

Baron first became a head coach in 1987 at Saint Francis University in Loretto, Pennsylvania. His teams showed improvement each of his first four seasons, culminating in an appearance in the 1991 NCAA tournament.

In 1992, Baron began a 20-season stint as a head coach in the Atlantic 10 Conference, returning to St. Bonaventure once again, this time as head coach. During his nine seasons as head coach, St. Bonaventure appeared in the 1995 National Invitation Tournament and 2000 NCAA tournament, the program's first NCAA Tournament appearance since 1978. As a #12 seed, St. Bonaventure lost 85–80 in double overtime to #5 Kentucky. The A-10 recognized Baron as Coach of the Year in 1995.

Baron became head coach at Rhode Island in 2001. After going 8–20 in his first season, Baron led Rhode Island to a 19–12 season the following year and won his second A-10 Coach of the Year award. Rhode Island spent four weeks ranked in the top-25 polls from December 24, 2007 to January 21, 2008. Rhode Island made three NIT appearances, including in the 2010 semifinals.

In April 2010, he agreed with Rhode Island to a contract extension through the 2013–14 season. However, after a 7–24 season and a second-to-last place conference finish in 2011–12, the university terminated his contract on March 4, 2012. Rhode Island never appeared in the NCAA Tournament during Baron's tenure.

Canisius College hired Baron as men's basketball head coach on April 2, 2012. After four years at Canisius, Baron announced his retirement from coaching on May 20, 2016.

== Personal life ==
Baron is the father of two professional basketball-playing sons, Jimmy and Billy Baron, both of whom he coached in college.

== Head coaching record ==
Record table
Season	Team	Overall	Conference	Standing	Postseason
Saint Francis Red Flash (Northeast Conference) (1987–1992)
1987–88	St. Francis (PA)	7–20	4–12	8th	
1988–89	St. Francis (PA)	13–16	7–11	T–8th	
1989–90	St. Francis (PA)	17–11	10–6	T–3rd	
1990–91	St. Francis (PA)	24–8	13–3	T–1st	NCAA First Round
1991–92	St. Francis (PA)	13–16	5–11	8th	
St. Francis (PA):		74–71 (.510)	39–43 (.476)		
St. Bonaventure Bonnies (Atlantic 10 Conference) (1992–2001)
1992–93	St. Bonaventure	10–17	0–14	8th	
1993–94	St. Bonaventure	10–17	4–12	9th	
1994–95	St. Bonaventure	18–13	9–7	T–4th	NIT Second Round
1995–96	St. Bonaventure	10–18	4–12	5th (East)	
1996–97	St. Bonaventure	14–14	5–11	5th (East)	
1997–98	St. Bonaventure	17–15	6–10	4th (East)	NIT First Round
1998–99	St. Bonaventure	14–15	8–8	4th (East)	
1999–2000	St. Bonaventure	21–10	11–5	2nd (East)	NCAA First Round
2000–01	St. Bonaventure	18–12	9–7	T–5th	NIT First Round
St. Bonaventure:		132–131 (.502)	56–86 (.394)		
Rhode Island Rams (Atlantic 10 Conference) (2001–2012)
2001–02	Rhode Island	7–19	3–12	12th	
2002–03	Rhode Island	19–12	10–6	T–4th	NIT Second Round
2003–04	Rhode Island	20–14	7–9	7th	NIT First Round
2004–05	Rhode Island	6–22	4–12	11th	
2005–06	Rhode Island	14–14	8–8	T–7th	
2006–07	Rhode Island	19–14	10–6	T–4th	
2007–08	Rhode Island	21–12	7–9	T–9th	NIT First Round
2008–09	Rhode Island	23–11	11–5	T–2nd	NIT Second Round
2009–10	Rhode Island	26–10	9–7	T–5th	NIT Semifinals
2010–11	Rhode Island	20–14	9–7	6th	CBI Quarterfinals
2011–12	Rhode Island	7–24	4–12	13th	
Rhode Island:		162–166 (.494)	82–93 (.469)		
Canisius Golden Griffins (Metro Atlantic Athletic Conference) (2012–2016)
2012–13	Canisius	20–14	11–7	5th	CIT Quarterfinals
2013–14	Canisius	21–13	14–6	T–3rd	CIT First Round
2014–15	Canisius	18–14	11–9	5th	CIT Quarterfinals
2015–16	Canisius	14–19	8–12	7th	
Canisius:		73–60 (.549)	44–34 (.564)		
Total:		425–415 (.506)			
National champion Postseason invitational champion Conference regular season champion Conference regular season and conference tournament champion Division regular season champion Division regular season and conference tournament champion Conference tournament champion
