= Rich Zvosec =

American basketball coach (born 1961)

Biographical details
- Born: March 13, 1961 (age 65); Lorain, Ohio, U.S.

Playing career
- 1981–1983: Defiance

Coaching career (HC unless noted)
- 1988–1991: St. Francis (NY)
- 1991–1997: North Florida
- 1997–1998: Millersville
- 1998–2000: Saint Peter's (assistant)
- 2000–2001: UMKC (assistant)
- 2001–2007: UMKC

Administrative career (AD unless noted)
- 2021: Arkansas State (interim AD)

Accomplishments and honors

Awards
- NEC Coach of the Year (1991); Mid-Con Coach of the Year (2005)

Rich Zvosec (born March 13, 1961) is a television broadcaster for ESPN and Fox Sports, motivational speaker and a Telly Award-winning actor, a former American college basketball coach and college administrator. After a 25-year coaching career, he currently serves as the associate athletics director for University of Central Florida.

== Life ==
Zvosec was born in Lorain, Ohio, and graduated from Lorain Catholic High School in 1979. He enrolled at Defiance College, where he played basketball and earned a bachelor's degree in business. In 1988 he became head coach of the St. Francis (NY) Terriers, becoming the youngest Division I coach in the country at age 27. In his third year, the Terriers recorded the program's first winning season since 1978 and had the most DI wins in two decades. Zvosec left in 1991, and became head coach for the University of North Florida North Florida Ospreys, the first in school history. In 1997, he left UNF for one year at Millersville University of Pennsylvania. In 2001, he succeeded Dean Demopoulos as head coach for the University of Missouri–Kansas City Kangaroos. Four of his six teams at UMKC finished with winning records. He also finished with one of the highest winning percentages in conference play while at the school, and the most conference wins in school history. He led the Kangaroos to a 93–52 win over Kansas State in December 2003, the school's 200th win and their first over the Wildcats. He left with the highest winning percentage in school history. Zvosec also had the second highest Mid-Continent Conference winning percentage during his six-year tenure. Zvosec was fired from UMKC on March 13, 2007. He subsequently worked as a color commentator for ESPN. Zvosec was inducted into the Lorain Sports Hall of Fame on May 3, 2007. In 2008 Zvosec authored a book about his collegiate coaching experiences called "Birds, Dogs and Kangaroos: Life on the Back Roads of College Basketball" In 2013, he became the associate athletic director of Arkansas State University. He is married to Hall of Fame Lacrosse player, Sandy Lanahan and have three children (Colin, Devin and Kailey).

== Head coaching record ==
Record table
Season	Team	Overall	Conference	Standing	Postseason
St. Francis (NY) Terriers (Northeast Conference) (1988–1991)
1988–89	St. Francis (NY)	11–16	5–11	9th	
1989–90	St. Francis (NY)	9–18	4–12	8th	
1990–91	St. Francis (NY)	15–14	8–8	5th	
St. Francis (NY):		38–48 (.442)	17–31 (.354)		
North Florida Ospreys (NAIA Independent) (1992–1993)
1992–93	North Florida	7–20			
North Florida Ospreys (Sunshine State Conference) (1993–1997)
1993–94	North Florida	15–13	5–9	T-6th	
1994–95	North Florida	10–17	2–12	8th	
1995–96	North Florida	14–15	6–9	6th	
1996–97	North Florida	8–19	2–12	7th	
North Florida:		54–84 (.391)	15–42 (.263)		
Millersville Marauders (Pennsylvania State Athletic Conference) (1997–1998)
1997–98	Millersville	11–16	7–5	T–2nd (Eastern)	
Millersville:		11–16 (.407)	7–5 (.583)		
UMKC Kangaroos (Mid-Continent Conference) (2001–2007)
2001–02	UMKC	18–11	7–7	5th	
2002–03	UMKC	9–20	7–7	5th	
2003–04	UMKC	15–14	9–7	T–5th	
2004–05	UMKC	16–12	12–4	2nd	
2005–06	UMKC	14–14	11–5	3rd	
2006–07	UMKC	12–20	6–8	T–5th	
UMKC:		84–91 (.480)	52–38 (.578)		
Total:		187–239 (.439)	91–116 (.440)		
National champion Postseason invitational champion Conference regular season champion Conference regular season and conference tournament champion Division regular season champion Division regular season and conference tournament champion Conference tournament champion
