= Vaughn Luton =

American basketball player

Personal information
- Born: Coraopolis, Pennsylvania, U.S.
- Listed height: 6 ft 6 in (1.98 m)

Career information
- High school: Cornell (Coraopolis, Pennsylvania)
- College: Youngstown State (1984–1986); Robert Morris (1986–1989)
- NBA draft: 1989: undrafted
- Position: Forward

Career highlights
- NEC Player of the Year (1989); First-team All-NEC (1989); Second-team All-NEC (1988); NEC tournament MVP (1989)

Vaughn Luton is an American former basketball player. He played college basketball for the Youngstown State Penguins and Robert Morris Colonials. Luton was chosen as the Northeast Conference Player of the Year with Robert Morris in 1989.

== Biography ==
Luton was raised in Coraopolis, Pennsylvania. He attended Cornell High School where he played on the basketball and football teams. Luton decided to focus on basketball and began his collegiate career with the Youngstown State Penguins where he was a starter during his freshman season. He was moved to the bench behind a freshman starter for his sophomore season and he quit the team after two games. In January 1986, Luton transferred to play for the Robert Morris Colonials.

Luton scored 1,134 points and 517 rebounds during his three seasons at Robert Morris. He was selected as the Northeast Conference Player of the Year during his senior season in 1989 when he averaged 17.9 points and 6.9 rebounds per game. Luton was inducted into the RMU Athletic Hall of Fame in 2016.

Luton was drafted by the Wichita Falls Texans of the Continental Basketball Association (CBA) in 1989. After his playing career ended, he worked for the collections and recovery department of a major corporation.

Luton has five children. His older brother, John, played for the Penn State Nittany Lions football team.
