= Wilbur Trosch =

American basketball player

Personal information
- Born: August 2, 1938 Clairton, Pennsylvania
- Died: May 5, 2014 (aged 75) Fishers, Indiana
- Listed height: 6 ft 8 in (2.03 m)
- Listed weight: 240 lb (109 kg)

Career information
- High school: Clariton (Clariton, Pennsylvania)
- College: Saint Francis (1957–1960)
- NBA draft: 1960: 2nd round, 13th overall pick
- Drafted by: Syracuse Nationals
- Playing career: 1960–1961
- Position: Forward

Career history
- 1960–1961: New York Tuck Tapers
- Stats at Basketball Reference

Wilbur R. Trosch (August 2, 1938 – May 5, 2014) was an American basketball player and coach. He excelled in both academics and athletics at Clairton High School in his hometown of Clairton, Pennsylvania, and earned a scholarship to play college basketball for the Saint Francis Red Flash. Trosch led the Red Flash in scoring for all three seasons he played and was named team captain during his senior season. Although his 6 ft 8 in (2.03 m) height led to his nickname "Tree", Trosch did not play as a traditional big man and instead preferred long-range shooting as he remarked that he had "a guard's mentality". He ranks 12th in points and sixth in rebounds amongst Red Flash players.

Trosch was selected by the Syracuse Nationals as the 13th overall pick in the 1960 NBA draft but he never played in the National Basketball Association (NBA) as he wanted to start a family. He played with the New York Tuck Tapers in the National Industrial Basketball League (NIBL) during the 1960–61 season and tried out for the Pittsburgh Rens of the American Basketball League (ABL) prior to the 1961–62 season.

After his retirement from playing basketball, Trosch worked as a teacher at West Mifflin North High School. He taught social studies and history while he coached the basketball team. Trosch retired from teaching in 1998.

Trosch died of a heart attack in Fishers, Indiana, after he fell ill on a golf course in Indianapolis.
