= Northeast Conference Men's Basketball Player of the Year =

NEC Men's Basketball Player of the Year
- Awarded for: the most outstanding basketball player in the Northeast Conference
- Country: United States

History
- First award: 1983
- Most recent: Darin Smith Jr., Central Connecticut

The Northeast Conference Men's Basketball Player of the Year is an annual award given to the Northeast Conference's (NEC) most outstanding player. The award was first given following the 1982–83 season, when the league was known as the ECAC Metro Conference. (Note: The Northeast Conference was founded in 1981 as the ECAC Metro Conference, but member schools changed the name beginning with the 1989–90 school year.)

The most well-recognized NEC Player of the Year is Marist's Rik Smits, who won the award in both 1987 and 1988. Smits went on to have a successful National Basketball Association (NBA) career for 12 seasons (1988–2000), all with the Indiana Pacers. In 1998, Smits was named an Eastern Conference All-Star. In 2021–22, Alex Morales of Wagner became just the fourth NEC player to be named player of the year for two consecutive seasons, and the first since Charles Jones of Long Island University in 1997 and 1998.

LIU has the most winners with eight, all of whom represented Long Island University's Brooklyn campus before the school merged the athletic programs of its Brooklyn and Post campuses in July 2019. Central Connecticut is second with seven. All charter members of the Northeast Conference that are still members have had at least one winner.

== Key ==
†	Co-Players of the Year
*	Awarded a national player of the year award that same season: UPI College Basketball Player of the Year (1954–55 to 1995–96); Oscar Robertson Trophy (1958–59 to present); Naismith College Player of the Year (1968–69 to present); John R. Wooden Award (1976–77 to present)
Player (X)	Denotes the number of times the player has been awarded the NEC Player of the Year award at that point

== Winners ==
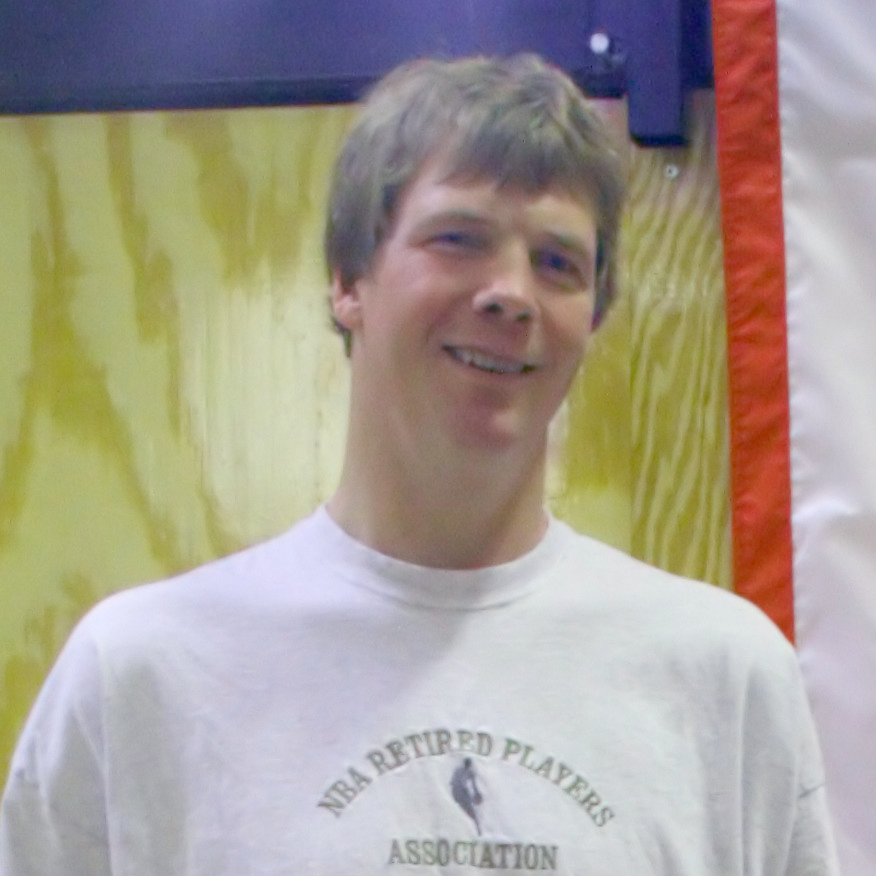
Rik Smits, Marist, 1987 and 1988

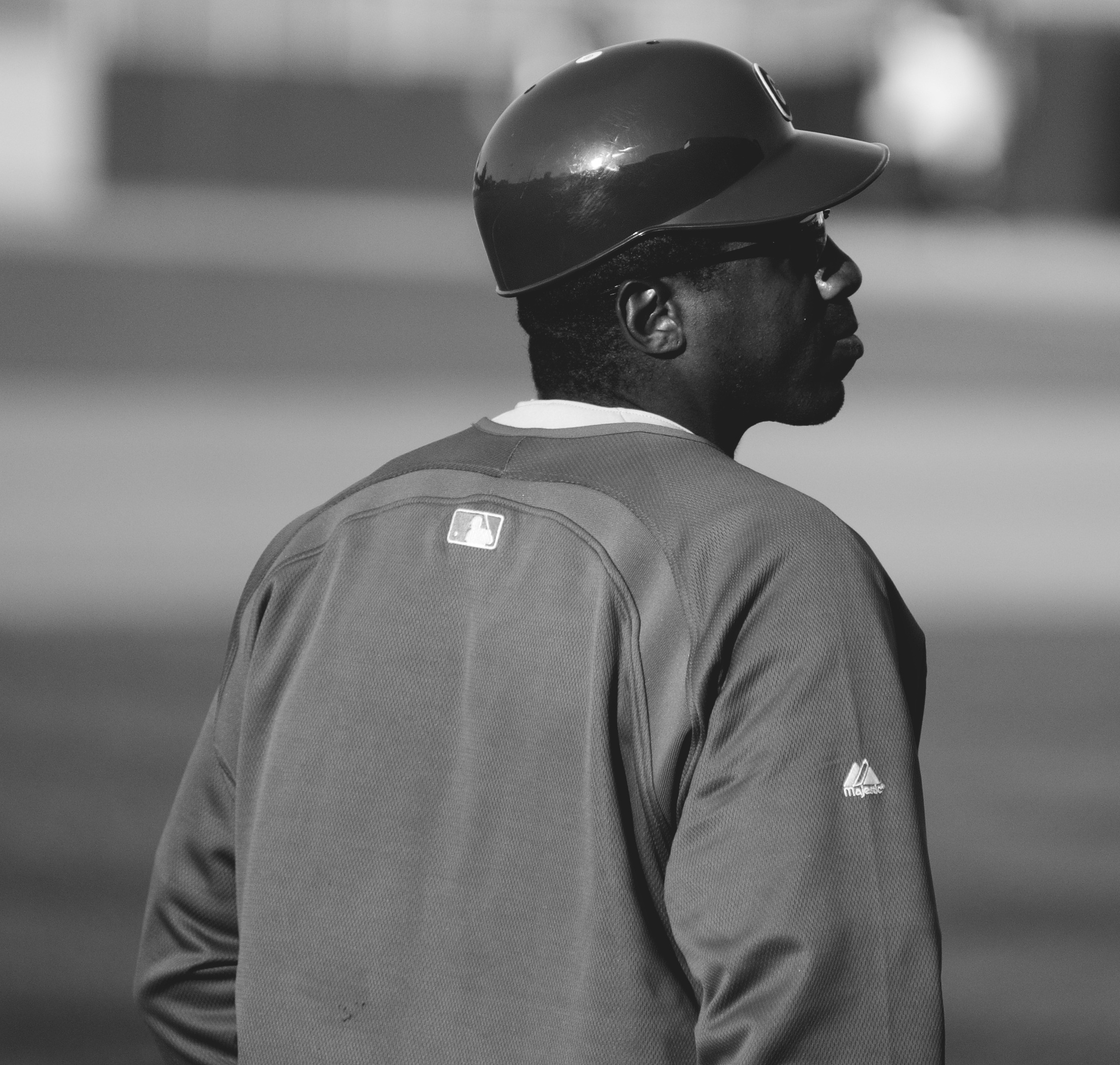
Desi Wilson, Fairleigh Dickinson, 1990

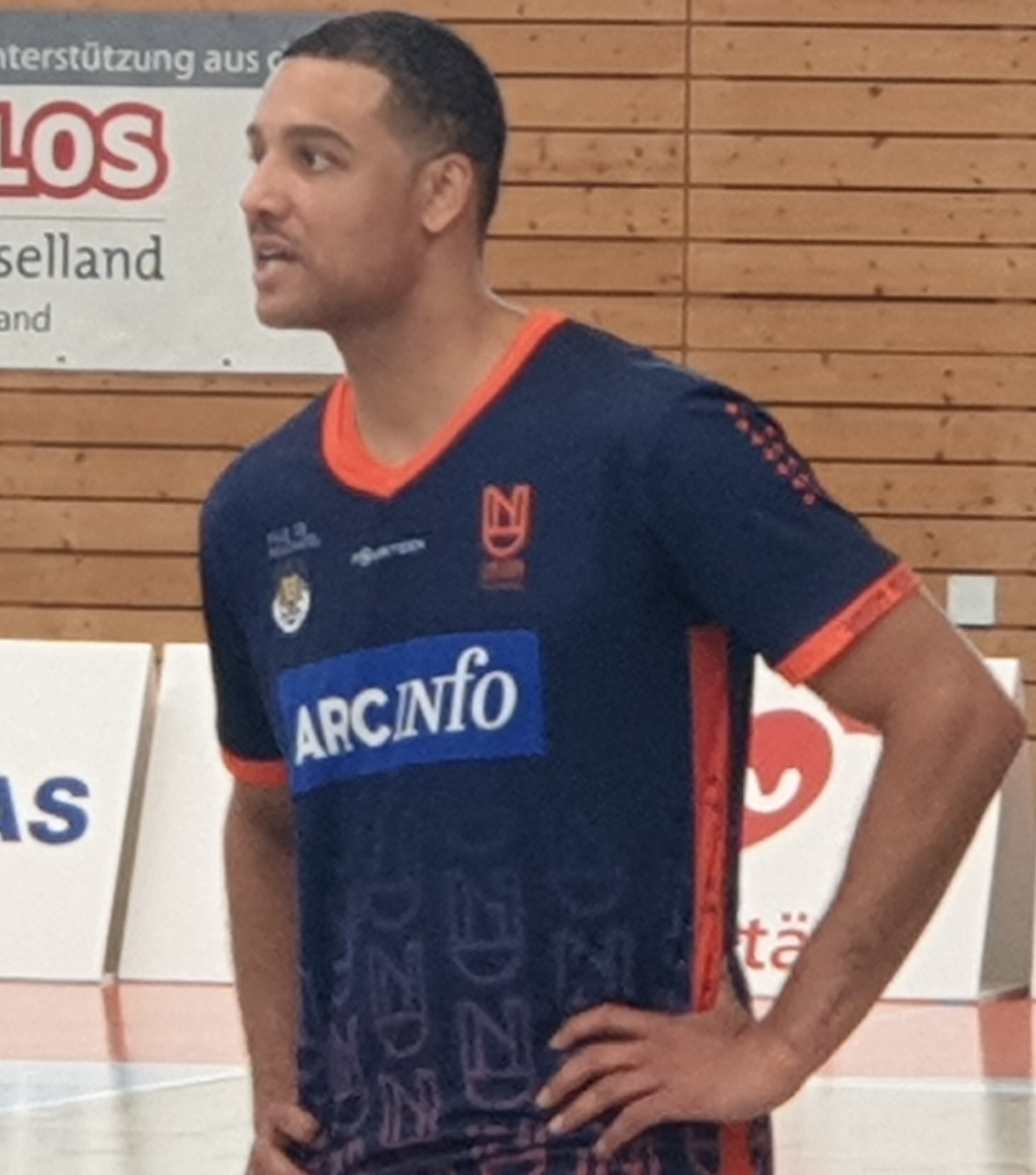
Chad Timberlake, Fairleigh Dickinson, 1990

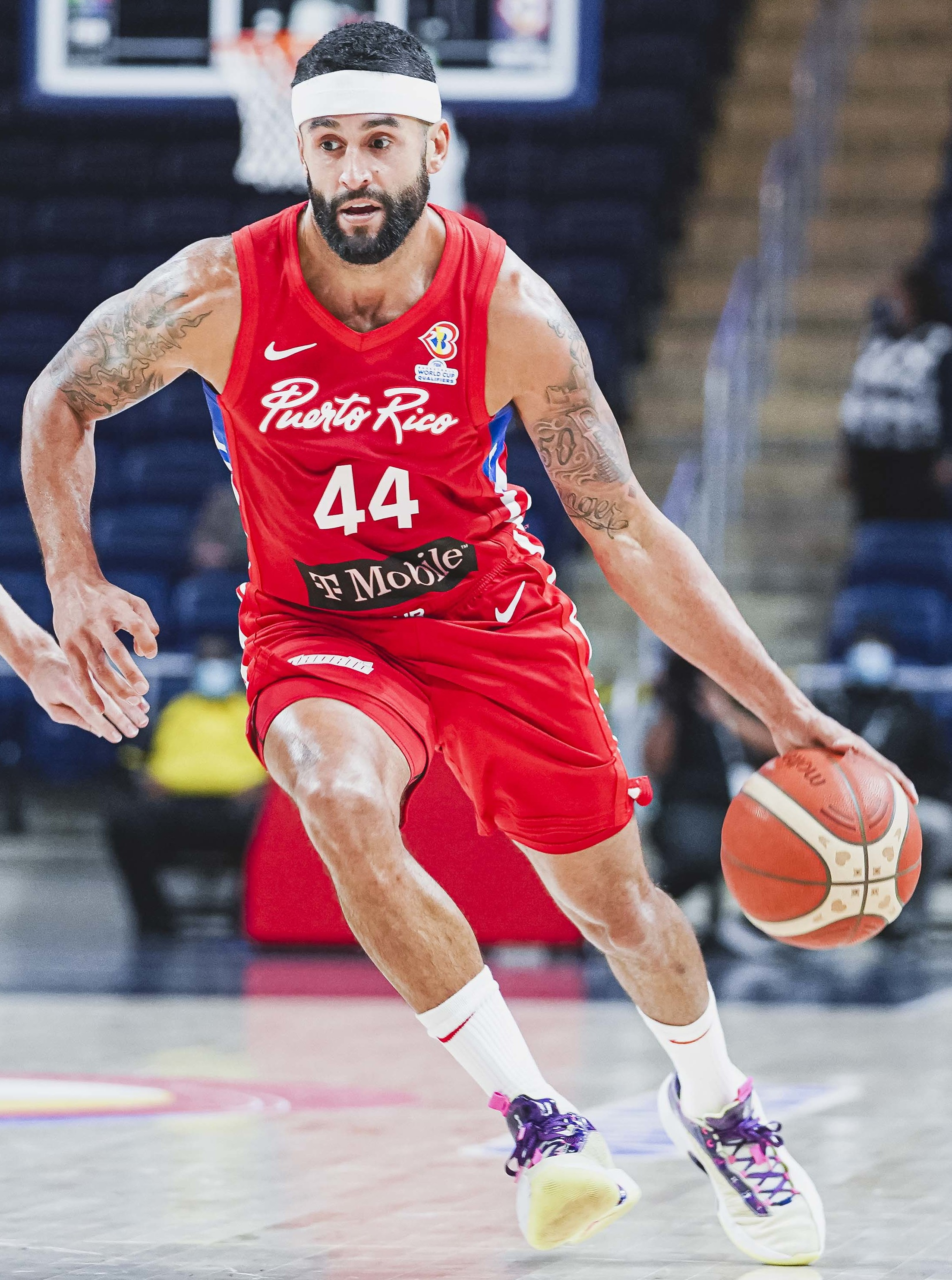
Javier Mojica, Central Connecticut, 2007

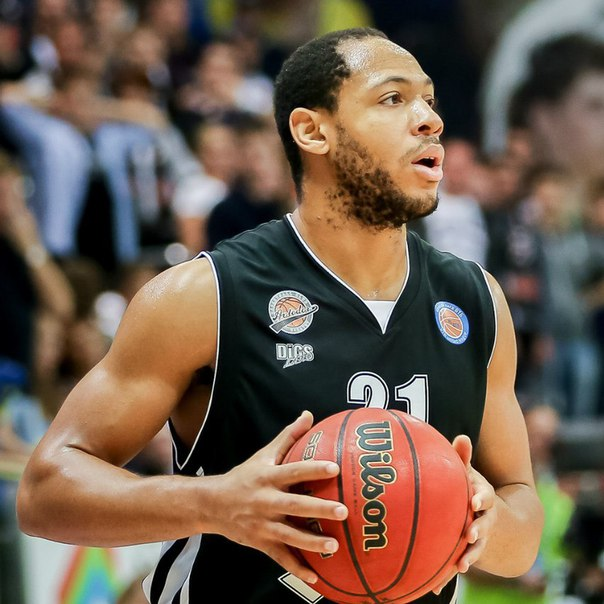
Jeremy Chappell, Robert Morris, 2009

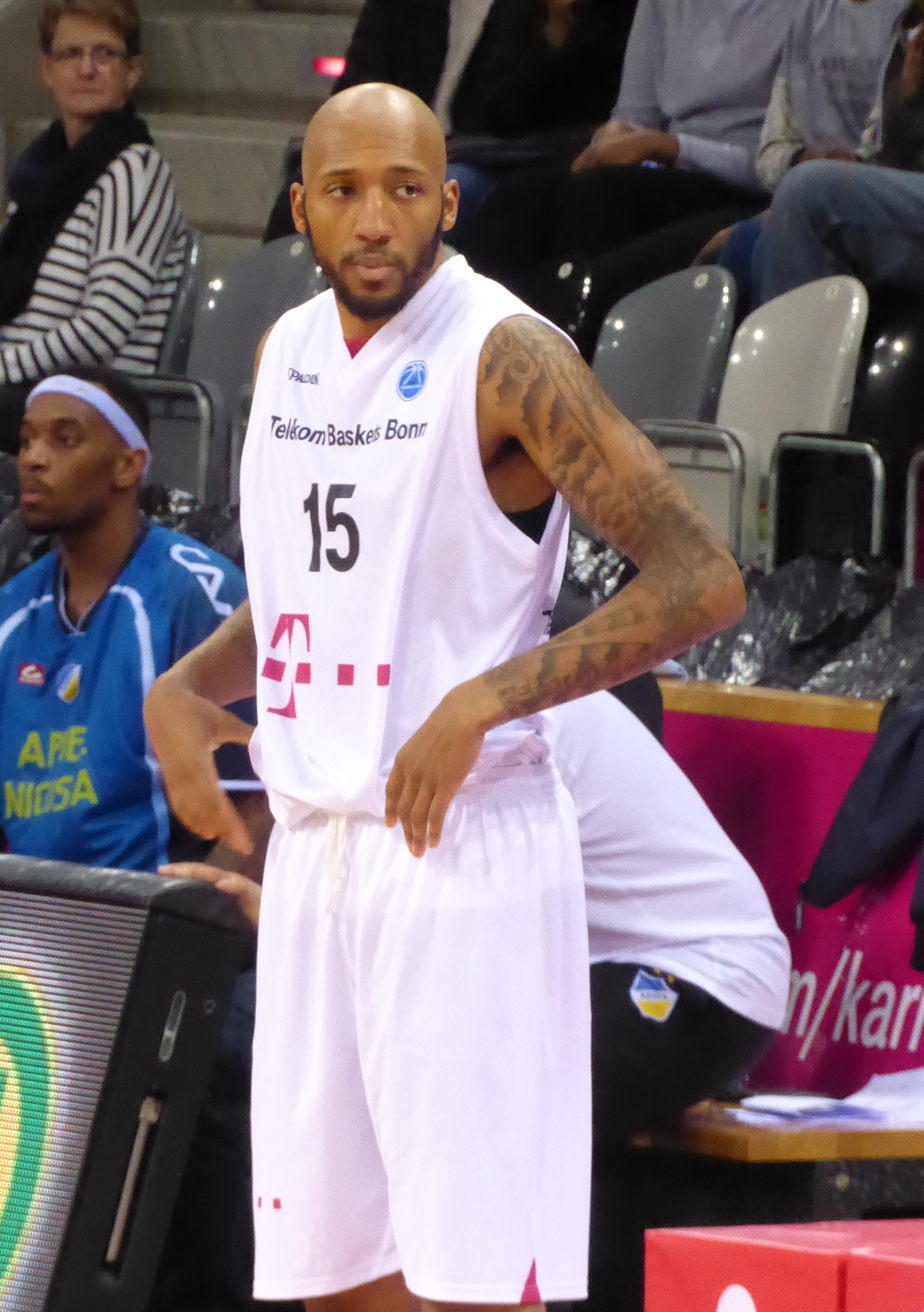
Ken Horton, Central Connecticut, 2011

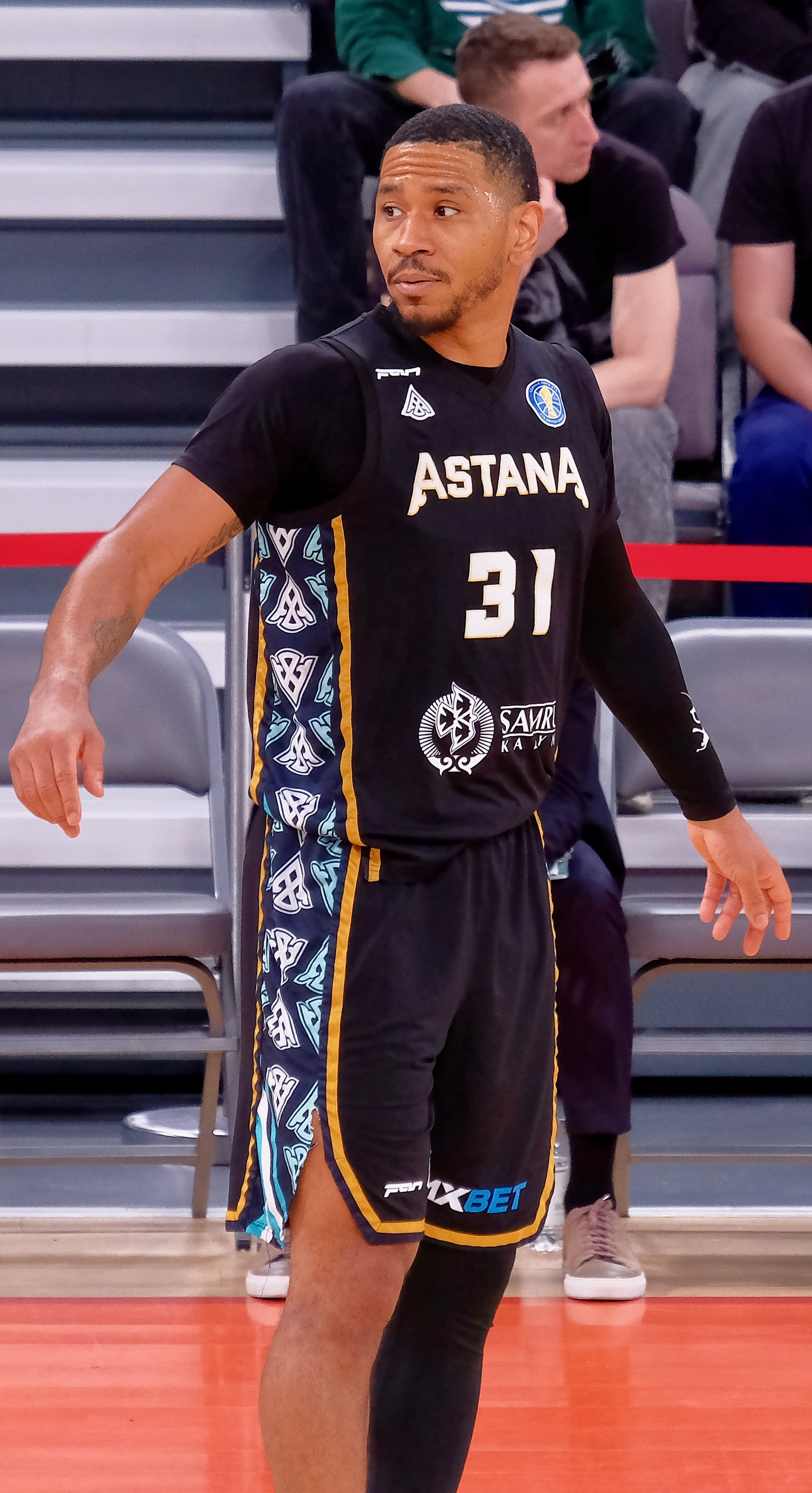
Karvel Anderson, Robert Morris, 2014

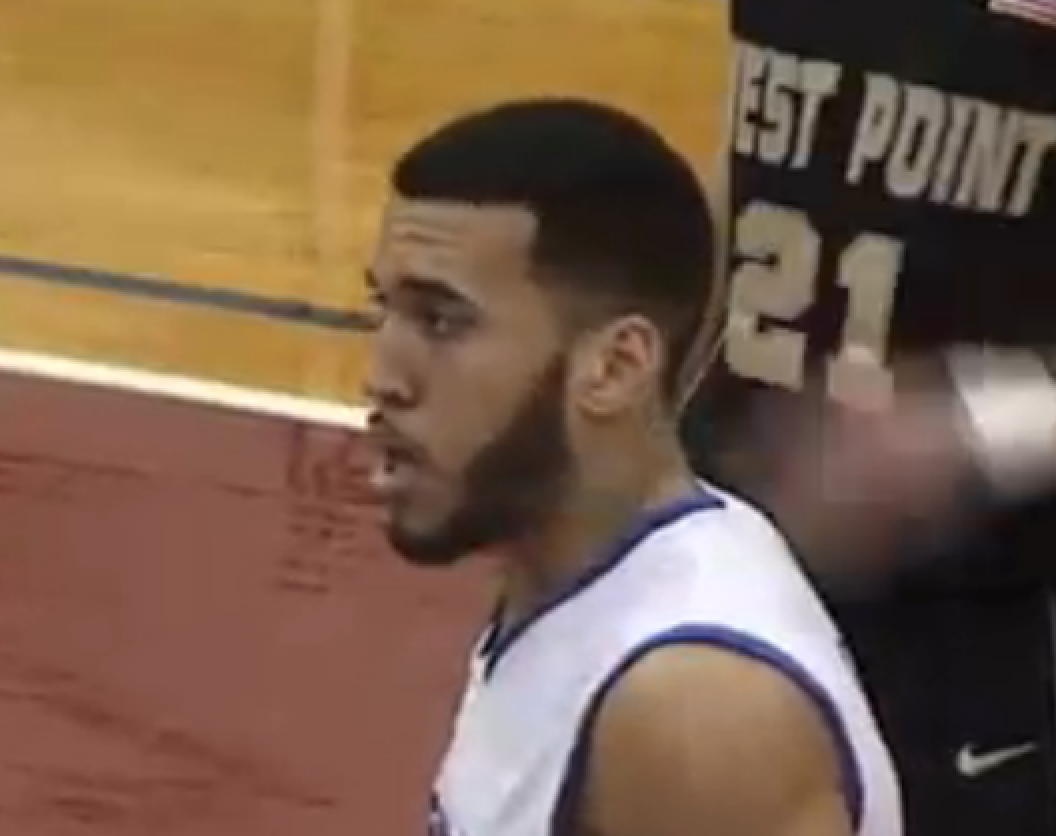
Jalen Cannon, St. Francis Brooklyn, 2015

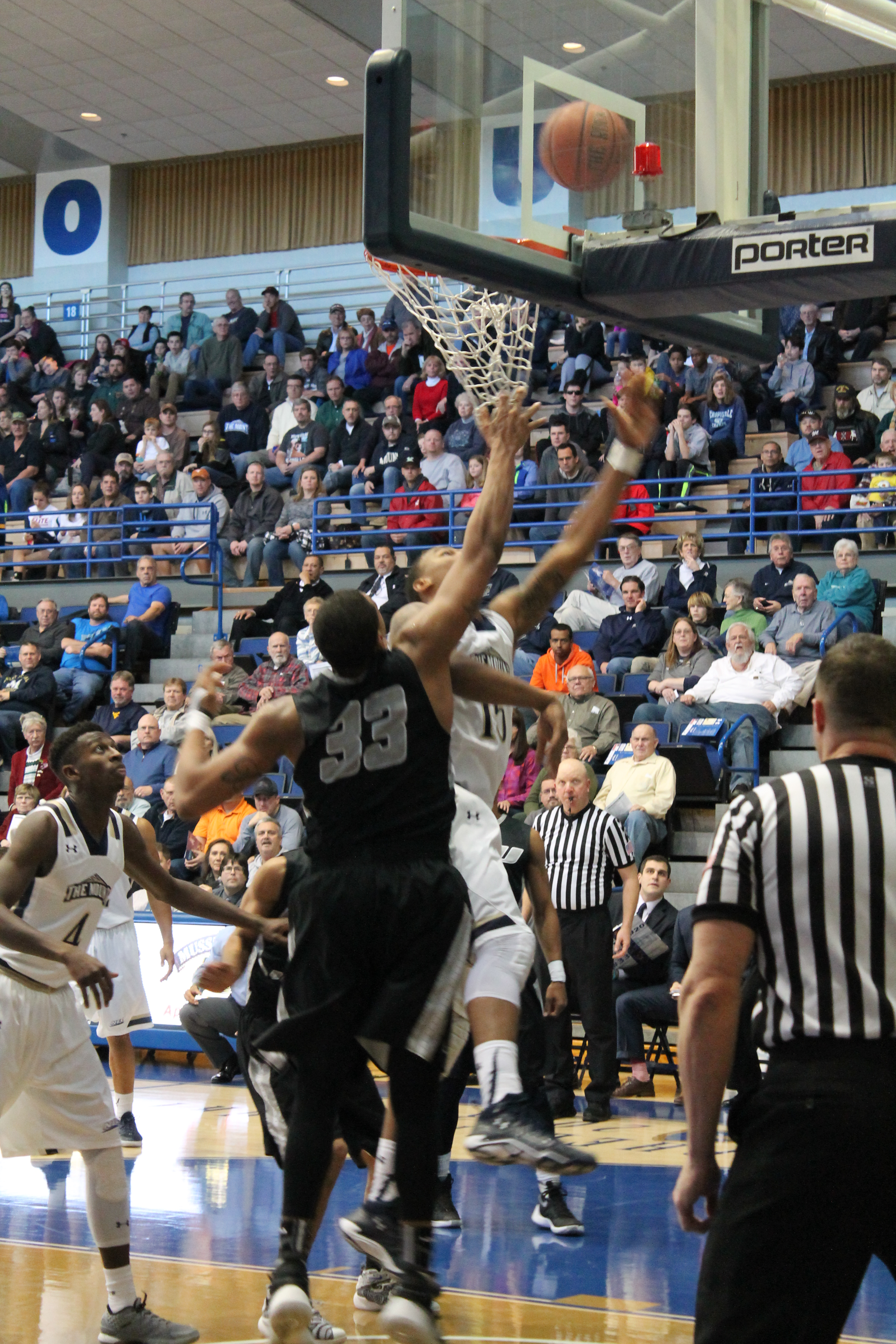
Jerome Frink, Long Island, 2017

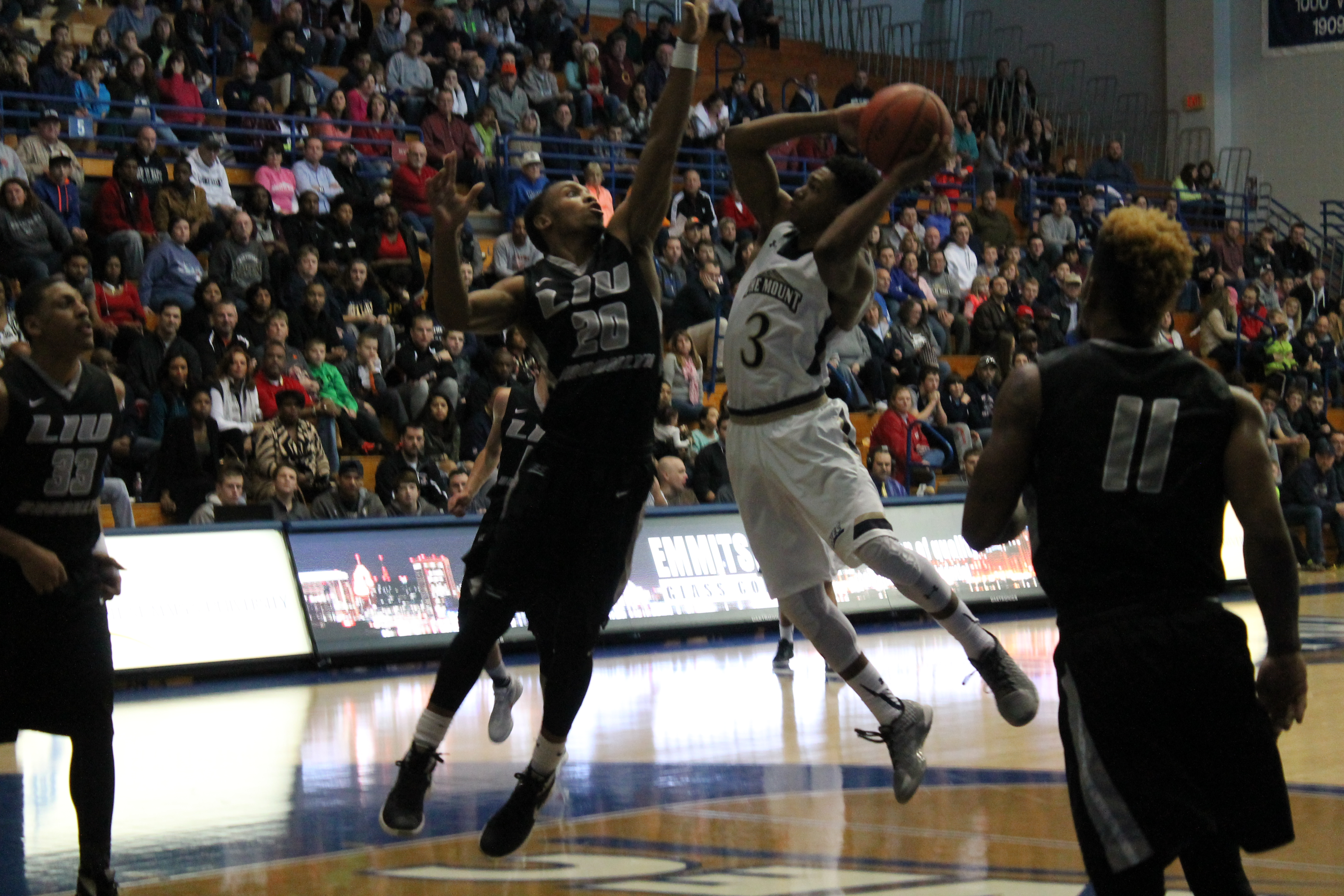
Junior Robinson (white), Mount St. Mary's, 2018

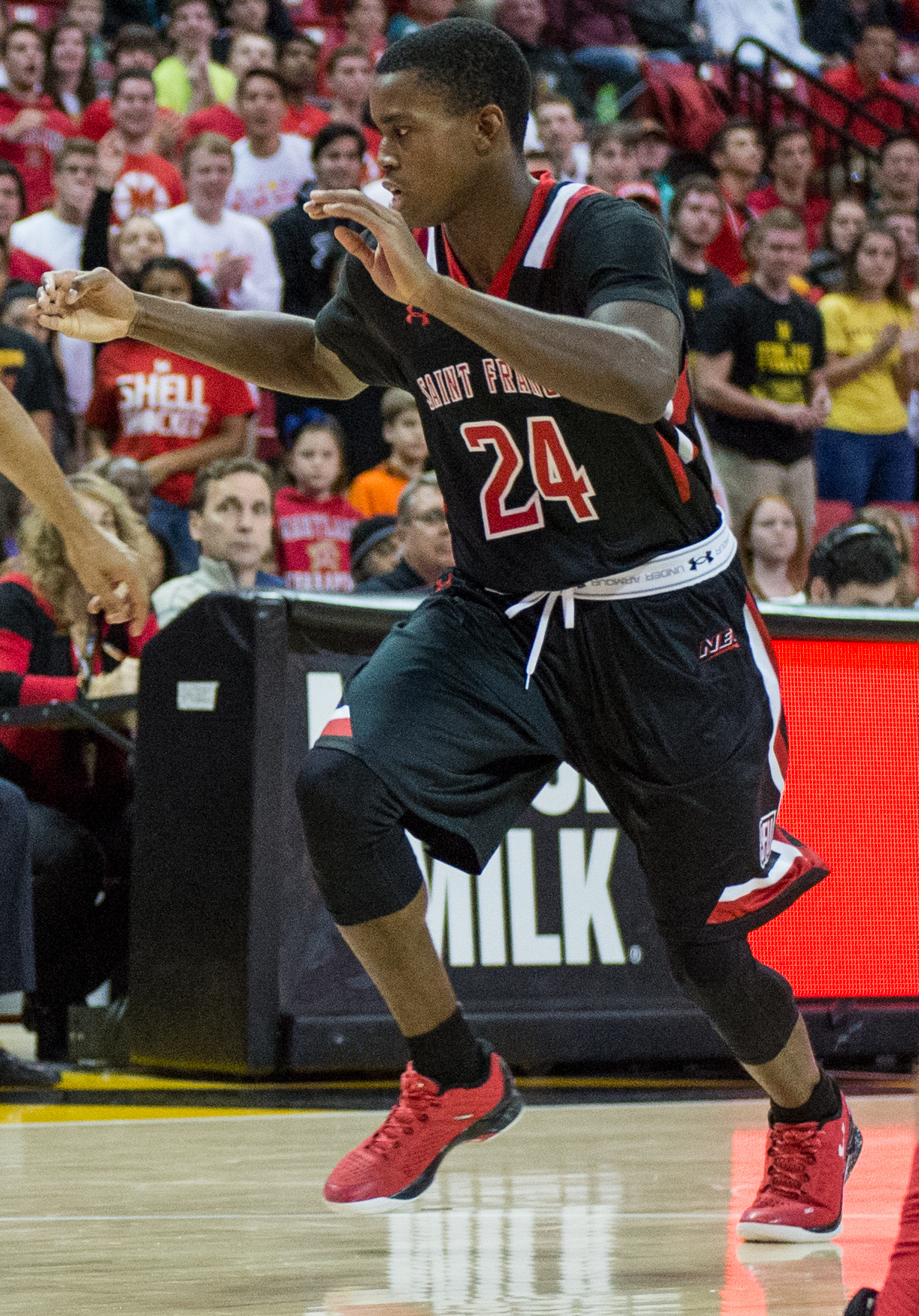
Isaiah Blackmon, Saint Francis (PA), 2020

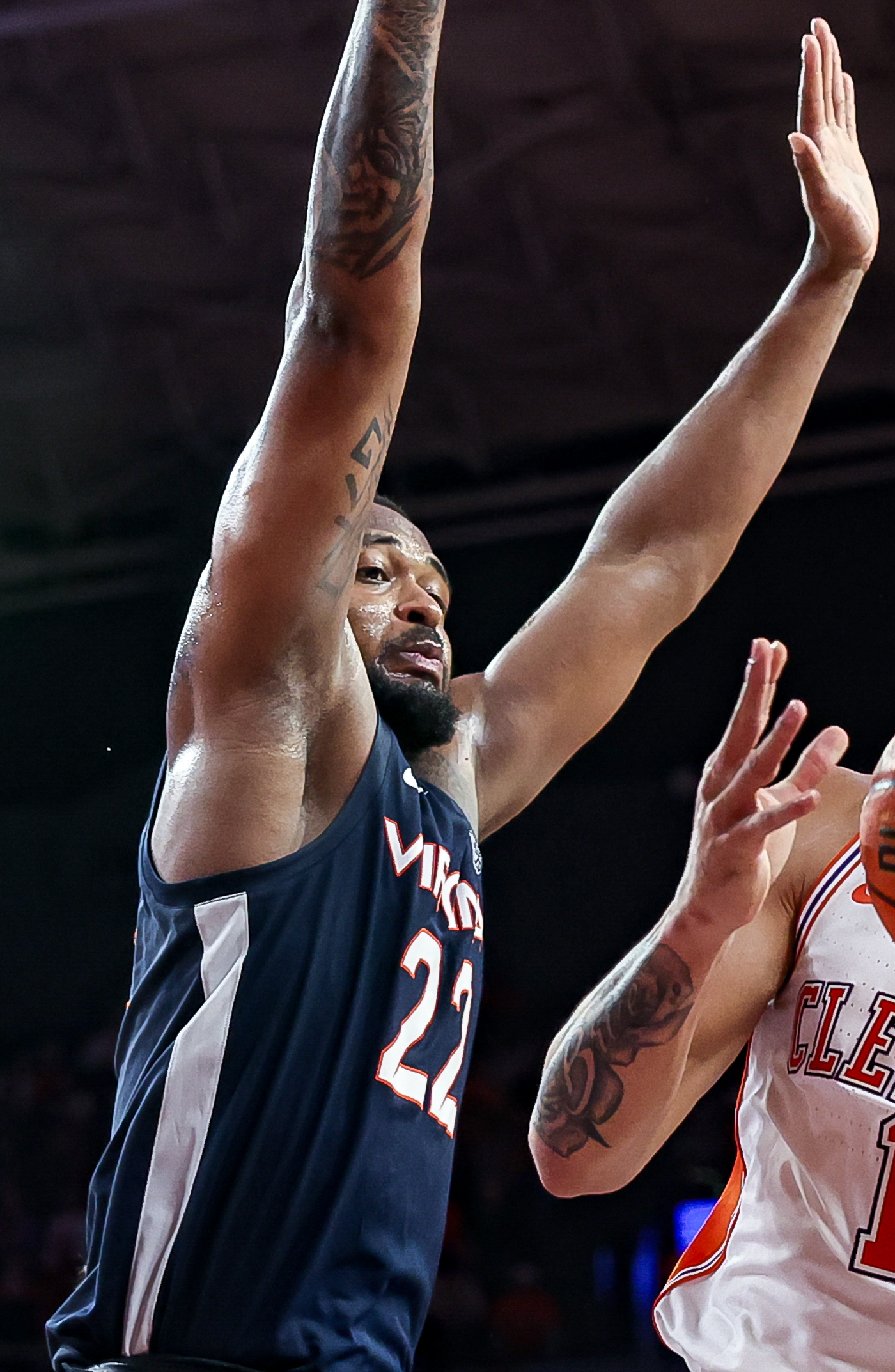
Jordan Minor, Merrimack, 2023

Season	Player	School	Position	Class	Reference
1982–83	Steve Smith	Marist	SG	Senior	
1983–84^{†}	Chipper Harris	Robert Morris	SG	Senior	
1983–84^{†}	Robert Jackson	St. Francis (NY)	F	Senior	
1983–84^{†}	Carey Scurry	Long Island	PF	Junior	
1984–85	Carey Scurry (2)	Long Island	PF	Senior	
1985–86	Terrance Bailey	Wagner	SG	Junior	
1986–87	Rik Smits	Marist	C	Junior	
1987–88	Rik Smits (2)	Marist	C	Senior	
1988–89	Vaughn Luton	Robert Morris	G	Senior	
1989–90	Desi Wilson	Fairleigh Dickinson	F	Junior	
1990–91	Mike Iuzzolino	Saint Francis (PA)	PG	Senior	
1991–92	Myron Walker	Robert Morris	SG	Sophomore	
1992–93	Darrick Suber	Rider	SG	Senior	
1993–94	Izett Buchanan	Marist	SF	Senior	
1994–95	Joe Griffin	Long Island	PF	Senior	
1995–96	Chris McGuthrie	Mount St. Mary's	PG	Senior	
1996–97	Charles Jones	Long Island	PG / SG	Junior	
1997–98	Charles Jones (2)	Long Island	PG / SG	Senior	
1998–99	Ray Minlend	St. Francis (NY)	PG	Senior	
1999–00	Rick Mickens	Central Connecticut	SG	Senior	
2000–01	Rahsaan Johnson	Monmouth	PG	Junior	
2001–02	Corsley Edwards	Central Connecticut	F	Senior	
2002–03	Jermaine Hall	Wagner	SF	Senior	
2003–04	Ron Robinson	Central Connecticut	F	Senior	
2004–05	Blake Hamilton	Monmouth	PF	Senior	
2005–06	Chad Timberlake	Fairleigh Dickinson	SG	Senior	
2006–07	Javier Mojica	Central Connecticut	SG / PG	Senior	
2007–08	Tony Lee	Robert Morris	PG	Senior	
2008–09	Jeremy Chappell	Robert Morris	SG	Senior	
2009–10	Justin Rutty	Quinnipiac	PF	Junior	
2010–11	Ken Horton	Central Connecticut	SF	Junior	
2011–12	Julian Boyd	Long Island	PF	Junior	
2012–13	Jamal Olasewere	Long Island	PF	Senior	
2013–14	Karvel Anderson	Robert Morris	SG	Senior	
2014–15	Jalen Cannon	St. Francis Brooklyn	PF	Senior	
2015–16	Cane Broome	Sacred Heart	SG	Sophomore	
2016–17	Jerome Frink	Long Island	SF	Senior	
2017–18	Junior Robinson	Mount St. Mary's	PG	Senior	
2018–19	Keith Braxton	Saint Francis (PA)	PG	Junior	
2019–20	Isaiah Blackmon	Saint Francis (PA)	PG	Senior	
2020–21	Alex Morales	Wagner	SG	Senior	
2021–22	Alex Morales (2)	Wagner	SG	Graduate	
2022–23	Josh Cohen	Saint Francis (PA)	PF	Junior	
2022–23	Jordan Minor	Merrimack	PF	Senior	
2023–24	Jordan Derkack	Merrimack	G	Sophomore	
2024–25	Jordan Jones	Central Connecticut	G	Senior	
2025–26	Darin Smith Jr.	Central Connecticut	SF	Sophomore	

== Winners by school ==
School (year joined)	Winners	Years
LIU (1981) (Note: From 1981 to 2019, Long Island University was represented in the Northeast Conference by its Brooklyn campus, known for athletic purposes as "Long Island" through the 2012–13 season and "LIU Brooklyn" from 2013–14 forward. After the 2018–19 season, LIU merged the athletic programs of its Brooklyn and Post campuses into a single program, now competing as the LIU Sharks, that inherited the NCAA Division I and Northeast Conference memberships of the Brooklyn campus.)	8	1984^{†}, 1985, 1995, 1997, 1998, 2012, 2013, 2017
Central Connecticut (1997)	7	2000, 2002, 2004, 2007, 2011, 2025, 2026
Robert Morris (1981) (Note: Robert Morris University was a charter member in 1981, but left in 2020 to join the Horizon League.)	6	1984^{†}, 1989, 1992, 2008, 2009, 2014
Marist (1981) (Note: Marist University (then a "College") was a charter member in 1981, but left in 1997 to join the Metro Atlantic Athletic Conference (MAAC), now known as the Metro Conference.)	4	1983, 1987, 1988, 1994
Saint Francis (PA) (1981) (Note: Saint Francis University left the NEC and Division I in 2026 to join the NCAA Division III Presidents' Athletic Conference.)	4	1991, 2019, 2020, 2023^{†}
Wagner (1981)	4	1986, 2003, 2021, 2022
St. Francis Brooklyn (1981) (Note: St. Francis College discontinued its athletic program after the 2022–23 season.)	3	1984^{†}, 1999, 2015
Fairleigh Dickinson (1981)	2	1990, 2006
Merrimack (2019) (Note: Merrimack College and Sacred Heart University left in 2024 for the MAAC/Metro.)	2	2023^{†}, 2024
Monmouth (1985) (Note: Monmouth University and Quinnipiac University left in 2013 for the MAAC. Monmouth has since moved to the Coastal Athletic Association, while Quinnipiac remains in the MAAC/Metro.)	2	2001, 2005
Mount St. Mary's (1989) (Note: Mount St. Mary's University left in 2022 for the MAAC/Metro.)	2	1996, 2018
Quinnipiac (1998)	1	2010
Rider (1992) (Note: Rider University, which had spent five seasons in the NEC, left in 1997 to join the MAAC/Metro.)	1	1993
Sacred Heart (1999)	1	2016
Bryant (2008) (Note: Bryant University left in 2022 for the America East Conference.)	0	—
Chicago State (2024)	0	—
Le Moyne (2023) (Note: Le Moyne College will leave in 2027 to join the Metro.)	0	—
Loyola (MD) (1981) (Note: Loyola University Maryland (then Loyola College in Maryland), also a charter member, left in 1989 to join the MAAC, and is now in the Patriot League.)	0	—
Mercyhurst (2024)	0	—
New Haven (2025)	0	—
Siena (1981) (Note: Siena University (then a "College"), also a charter member, left in 1984 to join the MAAC.)	0	—
Stonehill (2022)	0	—
UMBC (1998) (Note: The University of Maryland, Baltimore County (UMBC) left in 2003 to join the America East Conference.)	0	—

== Footnotes ==
In addition, one charter member, Towson University (then Towson State University), left after the conference's first season of 1981–82, before the player of the year award was created. The Tigers left for the East Coast Conference, and are now in the Coastal Athletic Association.
