= Jarrett Durham =

American basketball player (born 1949)

Personal information
- Born: August 22, 1949 (age 77)
- Listed height: 6 ft 5 in (1.96 m)
- Listed weight: 188 lb (85 kg)

Career information
- High school: Aliquippa (Aliquippa, Pennsylvania)
- College: Duquesne (1968–1971)
- NBA draft: 1971: 4th round, 62nd overall pick
- Drafted by: Detroit Pistons
- Position: Forward
- Number: 23
- Coaching career: 1984–1995

Career history

Playing
- 1971–1972: New York Nets

Coaching
- 1973-1976: Duquesne (assistant)
- 1976-1978: Community College of Beaver County
- 1978-1984: Robert Morris (assistant)
- 1984-1996: Robert Morris
- 2000-2001: Duquesne (assistant)

Career highlights
- As coach: 2× NEC Coach of the Year (1989, 1990)
- Stats at Basketball Reference

Jarrett M. Durham (born August 22, 1949) is an American former professional basketball player who spent one season in the American Basketball Association (ABA) with the New York Nets during the 1971–72 season. He was drafted in the fourth round (62nd) overall) from Duquesne University by the Detroit Pistons, whom he never played for. He played one game for the Nets. Durham is currently the color analyst for the Duquesne Dukes Basketball Team.

Durham played college basketball for Duquesne. He was later the head coach of Robert Morris University men's basketball team.

== Head coaching record ==
Record table
| Season | Team | Overall | Conference | Standing | Postseason |
|---|---|---|---|---|---|
Robert Morris Colonials (Northeast Conference) (1985–1996)
| 1984–85 | Robert Morris | 9-19 | 4-10 | 7th | |
| 1985–86 | Robert Morris | 10-18 | 6-10 | T-6th | |
| 1986–87 | Robert Morris | 13-14 | 7-9 | T-5th | |
| 1987–88 | Robert Morris | 14-14 | 9-7 | 4th | |
| 1988–89 | Robert Morris | 21-9 | 12–4 | 1st | NCAA Division I Round of 64 |
| 1989-90 | Robert Morris | 22-8 | 12-4 | 1st | NCAA Division I Round of 64 |
| 1990-91 | Robert Morris | 17-11 | 12-4 | 3rd | |
| 1991-92 | Robert Morris | 19-12 | 12-4 | 1st | NCAA Division I Round of 64 |
| 1992-93 | Robert Morris | 9-18 | 7-11 | T–7th | |
| 1993-94 | Robert Morris | 14-14 | 11-7 | T-3rd | |
| 1994-95 | Robert Morris | 4-23 | 2-16 | 10th | |
| 1995-96 | Robert Morris | 5-23 | 2-16 | 10th | |
| Robert Morris: | | 157–183 (.462) | 96–102 (.485) | | |
| Total: | | 157–183 (.462) | | | |
National champion Postseason invitational champion Conference regular season champion Conference regular season and conference tournament champion Division regular season champion Division regular season and conference tournament champion Conference tournament champion
