= Mike Iuzzolino =

American basketball coach and player

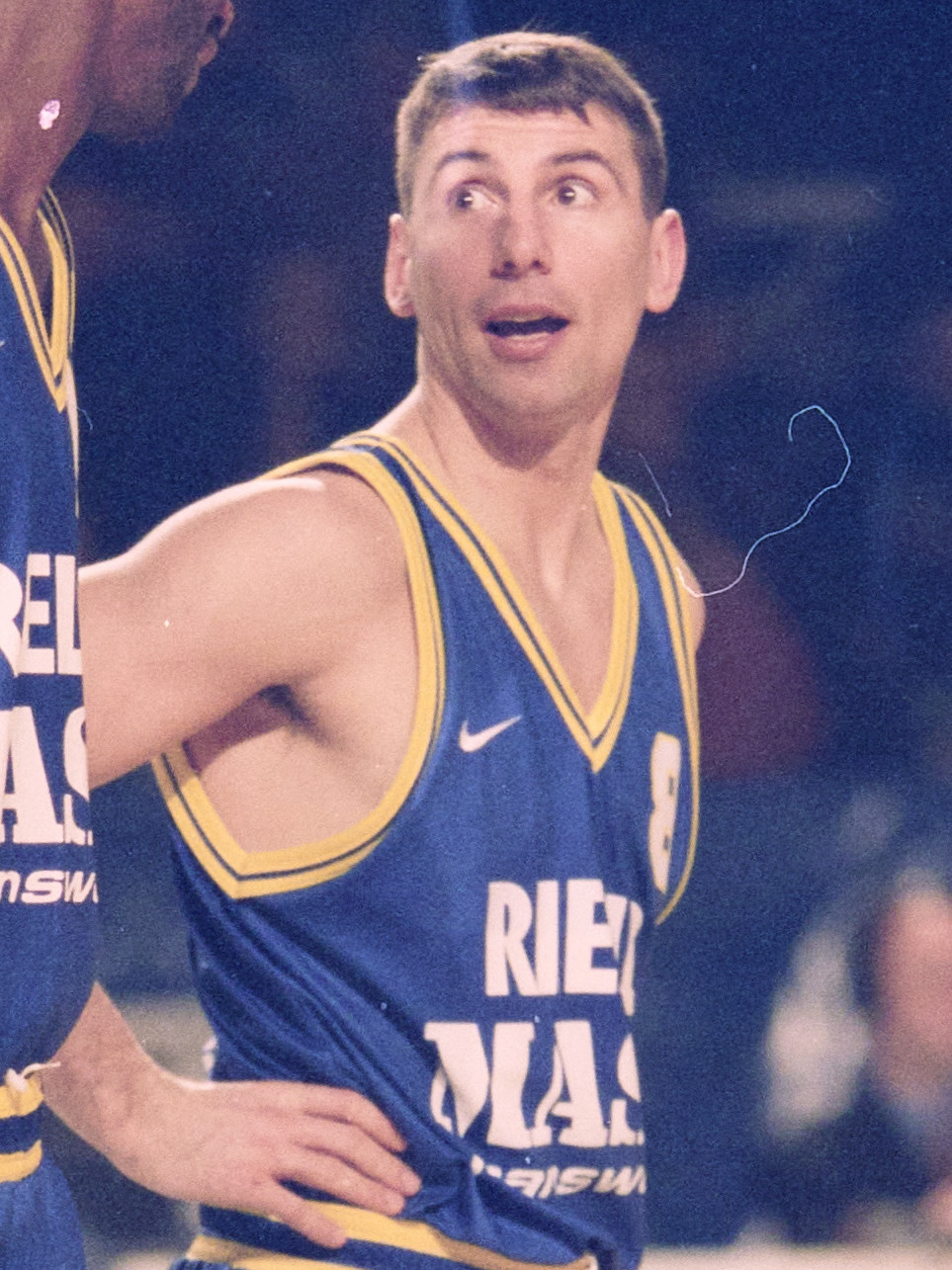
- Iuzzolino with Verona in 1998

Robert Morris Colonials
- Title: Assistant coach
- League: Northeast Conference

Personal information
- Born: January 22, 1968 (age 58) Altoona, Pennsylvania, U.S.
- Listed height: 5 ft 10 in (1.78 m)
- Listed weight: 175 lb (79 kg)

Career information
- High school: Altoona Area (Altoona, Pennsylvania)
- College: Penn State (1986–1988); Saint Francis (PA) (1989–1991)
- NBA draft: 1991: 2nd round, 35th overall pick
- Drafted by: Dallas Mavericks
- Playing career: 1991–2003
- Position: Point guard
- Number: 55, 13

Career history

Playing
- 1991–1993: Dallas Mavericks
- 1993–1994: Rochester Renegade
- 1994: Fort Wayne Fury
- 1994–1995: Shreveport Crawdads
- 1995: Rapid City Thrillers
- 1995–1999: Scaligera Verona
- 1999–2000: Adr Roma
- 2000–2001: Olimpia Adecco Milano
- 2001–2002: Peristeri
- 2002: Lobos Cantabria
- 2002–2003: Edimes Pavia
- 2003: Forum Filatélico

Coaching
- 2005–2007: Duquesne (assistant)
- 2007–2008: George Mason (assistant)
- 2008–2012: St. Vincent College (associate HC)
- 2014–2016: Canisius (assistant)
- 2016–2021: Robert Morris (assistant)
- 2021–2024: Robert Morris (associate HC)
- 2024-present: Sewickley Academy

Career highlights
- NEC Player of the Year (1991); 2× First-team All-NEC (1990, 1991)

Career statistics
- Points: 1,096 (9.0 ppg)
- Assists: 522 (4.3 apg)
- Rebound: 238 (2.0 rpg)
- Stats at NBA.com
- Stats at Basketball Reference

Michael Alan Iuzzolino (born January 22, 1968) is an American basketball coach and former player who is an assistant men's coach at Robert Morris University. He was selected by the Dallas Mavericks in the second round (35th pick overall) of the 1991 NBA draft. Iuzzolino, a 5-foot 10 inch point guard, played two years in the National Basketball Association (NBA), both with the Mavericks. He averaged 9.0 points per game in his career. In 1993, he signed as a free agent with the Orlando Magic, but was waived. After his NBA career, Iuzzolino played professionally in Italy and Spain.

Iuzzolino played college basketball for the Penn State Nittany Lions and Saint Francis Red Flash. He played high school basketball at Altoona High School in Altoona, Pennsylvania. He was a high school teammate of Doug West, who went on to have a successful NBA career with the Minnesota Timberwolves and Vancouver Grizzlies.

Iuzzolino held assistant coaching positions at Saint Vincent College, Duquesne University, and George Mason University before becoming the director of basketball operations at Canisius College. In 2013, he assumed the same role at the University New Mexico.

Iuzzolino was featured in the 1993 arcade edition of the popular video game NBA Jam. He is an Italian American, and holds an Italian passport. Iuzzolino was inducted into the Blair County Sports Hall of Fame alongside Coach John Swogger. In April 2017, Iuzzolino's number 8 jersey was retired by Scaligera Verona in a ceremony prior to Verona-Treviso game in Italian second division.
