= Daniel Lynch (basketball) =

American athletic director and coach

Biographical details
- Born: 1916
- Died: November 30, 1981; New York, New York, U.S.
- Education: St. Francis College (B.S.)

Playing career
- 1934–1938: St. Francis (NY)

Coaching career (HC unless noted)
- 1948–1969: St. Francis College

Administrative career (AD unless noted)
- 1964–1975: St. Francis Brooklyn Terriers

Head coaching record
- Overall: 283–237 (54.4%)

Accomplishments and honors

Championships
- 1x MCC Regular Season Champions (1966–67); 2x MTNY Regular Season Champions (1955–56, 1953–54); 1x National Catholic Invitation Champions (1951)

Daniel J. Lynch (1916–1981) was the former athletic director and basketball coach at St. Francis College. Lynch was also a noted public speaker, regularly addressing civic and sports groups. Lynch was often referred to as The Smiling Irishman.

== Biography ==
Daniel Lynch graduated from St. Francis College in 1938. He played on the college's basketball team from 1934 to 1938 and was the team's captain. Lynch then went on to become the basketball head coach at his alma mater from 1948 to 1969. In 1964 he was appointed as the athletic director of St. Francis College, a post he held for eleven years, until 1975. One of Lynch's sons, Daniel Lynch Jr., also attended St. Francis College and is a graduate of the 1970 class.

Lynch was one of the original proponents of the three-point field goal.

== St. Francis College ==
Lynch holds the St. Francis College record for most wins by a coach. During his tenure the Terriers men's basketball program experienced their best seasons. The greatest of which, was the 1955–56 season. The Terriers compiled a 21–4 record, were ranked as high as 13th nationally and upset Niagara University to reach the NIT semi-finals before they were defeated.

From 1948 to 1952 the Terriers participated in 4 National Catholic Invitational Tournaments (NCIT). The NCIT was a premier post-season tournament at that time. The Terriers went to the NCIT finals three consecutive times and won the Championship in 1951. Lynch's 1950–51 squad defeated the Seattle University Redhawks 93–79 in the Championship game.

From 1953 to 1969, Lynch guided the Terriers to 3 NIT appearances and 3 Conference Regular Season Championships. Lynch coached many great players like Al Innis and Jim Luisi and during his tenure had 7 players drafted by the NBA.

Lynch was also a large supporter of the Terriers having their own basketball court. Prior to building the Generoso Pope Athletic Complex in 1971, the Terriers for 21 seasons did not have a home court of their own. They played at the 14th Regiment Armory, the 69th Regiment Armory, and at times the Bishop Ford High School gymnasium.

== Head coaching record ==
Record table
Season	Team	Overall	Conference	Standing	Postseason
St. Francis (NY) Terriers (Metropolitan New York Conference) (1948–1963)
1948–1949	St. Francis (NY)	20–13	2–2	5th	NCIT Finals
1949–1950	St. Francis (NY)	6–18	0–4	7th	NCIT Finals
1950–1951	St. Francis (NY)	19–11	1–5	T-6th	NCIT Champions
1951–1952	St. Francis (NY)	20–8	4–2	2nd	NCIT Semi-finals
1952–1953	St. Francis (NY)	20–7	2–3	4th	
1953–1954	St. Francis (NY)	23–5	5–0	1st	NIT Quarter-finals
1954–1955	St. Francis (NY)	21–8	2–3	4th	
1955–1956	St. Francis (NY)	21–4	4–0	1st	NIT Semi-finals
1956–1957	St. Francis (NY)	12–14	1–2	6th	
1957–1958	St. Francis (NY)	14–9	2–1	3rd	
1958–1959	St. Francis (NY)	5–18	0–3	7th	
1959–1960	St. Francis (NY)	13–8	2–1	3rd	
1960–1961	St. Francis (NY)	10–10	2–1	3rd	
1961–1962	St. Francis (NY)	8–15	2–3	4th	
1962–1963	St. Francis (NY)	16–7	4–2	3rd	NIT First Round
St. Francis (NY):		228–155	33–32		
St. Francis (NY) Terriers (Independent) (1963–1965)
1963–1964	St. Francis (NY)	10–16		6th	
1964–1965	St. Francis (NY)	11–9		6th	
St. Francis (NY):		21–25			
St. Francis (NY) Terriers (Metropolitan Collegiate Conference) (1965–1968)
1965–1966	St. Francis (NY)	5–17	0–9	10th	
1966–1967	St. Francis (NY)	15–8	7–2	T-1st	
1967–1968	St. Francis (NY)	7–16	0–8	9th	
St. Francis (NY):		27–41	7–19		
St. Francis (NY) Terriers (Independent) (1968–1969)
1968–1969	St. Francis (NY)	7–16			
St. Francis (NY):		7–16			
Total:		283–237			
National champion Postseason invitational champion Conference regular season champion Conference regular season and conference tournament champion Division regular season champion Division regular season and conference tournament champion Conference tournament champion
