= 1960–61 St. Francis Terriers men's basketball team =

American college basketball season

1960–61 St. Francis Terriers men's basketball
- Conference: Metropolitan New York Conference
- Record: 10–10 (2–1 MTNY)
- Head coach: Daniel Lynch (13th season)
- Home arena: 69th Regiment Armory

1960–61 Metropolitan New York Conference men's basketball standings
	Conf.				Overall
Team	W		L	PCT	W		L	PCT
St. John's	4	–	0	1.000	20	–	5	.800
NYU	2	–	1	.667	12	–	11	.522
St. Francis (NY)	2	–	1	.667	10	–	10	.500
CCNY	1	–	1	.500	7	–	10	.412
Manhattan	1	–	2	.333	8	–	11	.421
Brooklyn	0	–	2	.000	4	–	14	.222
Fordham	0	–	3	.000	7	–	16	.304
Rankings from AP Poll

The 1960–61 St. Francis Terriers men's basketball team represented St. Francis College during the 1960–61 NCAA men's basketball season. The team was coached by Daniel Lynch, who was in his thirteenth year at the helm of the St. Francis Terriers. The team was a member of the Metropolitan New York Conference and played their home games at the 69th Regiment Armory in Manhattan. It was their first year hosting games at the 69th Regiment Armory, previously the Terriers played at the II Corps Artillery Armory in Park Slope, Brooklyn.

The Terriers finished the season at 10–10 overall and 2–1 in conference play. In December, the Terriers participated in the Middle Eastern College Athletic Association Tournament, they finished 6th out of eight teams.

== Roster ==
1960–61 St. Francis Brooklyn Terriers men's basketball team
Players
Coaches

Pos.	#	Name	Height	Weight	Year	Previous school	Hometown
F	23	Richard Dreyer (C)	6 ft 2 in (1.88 m)	—	Sr	Aviation Trades High School
C	51	Dave Lopez	6 ft 2 in (1.88 m)	—	Jr
G	21	George Davey	5 ft 10 in (1.78 m)	—	Sr
G	25	Tom Rooney	5 ft 10 in (1.78 m)	—
G	31	Henry O'Lee	6 ft 0 in (1.83 m)	—	Sr
F	15	James Raferty	6 ft 3 in (1.91 m)	—	So
G	5	Ray Nash	6 ft 0 in (1.83 m)	—	So	St. Francis Preparatory School
G	55	Charlie Novak	6 ft 0 in (1.83 m)	—
G	35	John Jaisel	6 ft 1 in (1.85 m)	—
	41	Miller	—	—
	53	Krasnick	—	—

Head coach

- Daniel Lynch (St. Francis '38)

Assistant coach(es)

Legend

- (C) Team captain
- (S) Suspended
- (I) Ineligible
- (W) Walk-on
- Injured
- Current redshirt

== Schedule and results ==
Date time, TV	Opponent	Result	Record	Site city, state
Regular Season
December 3, 1960*	Hunter	W 70–66	1–0	69th Regiment Armory; New York, NY
December 6, 1960*	Pace	W 65–53	2–0	69th Regiment Armory; New York, NY
December 10, 1960*	Providence	L 42–44	2–1	69th Regiment Armory; New York, NY
December 17, 1960*	at Adelphi	W 84–56	3–1	Garden City, NY
Middle Eastern College Athletic Association Tournament
December 27, 1960*	vs. Fairleigh Dickinson; Quarterfinal Round	L 58–93	3–2	Jersey City Armory; Jersey City, NJ
December 28, 1960*	vs. Siena; Consolation 5th–8th place semi-finals	W 62–50	4–2	Saint Peter's College; Jersey City, NJ
December 29, 1960*	at Saint Peter's; 5th place match	L 95–108	4–3	Saint Peter's College; Jersey City, NJ
January 7, 1961*	Siena	L 47–52	4–4	69th Regiment Armory; New York, NY
January 10, 1961	at Brooklyn	W 82–64	5–4 (1–0)	69th Regiment Armory; New York, NY
January 14, 1961	at No. 5 St. John's	L 51–67	5–5 (1–1)	Queens College's Fitzgerald Gymnasium; Flushing, NY
January 28, 1961*	Bridgeport	W 101–83	6–5	69th Regiment Armory; New York, NY
February 4, 1961*; 8:30 p.m.	at Le Moyne	A snowstorm in Brooklyn made it difficult for the Terriers to travel to Syracuse. The game was postponed at 6 p.m., when it became obvious they would not make it for the 8:30 tip. Le Moyne proposed rescheduling the game for the following day, but the Terriers were scheduled to play at Siena, and they were unable to reach Siena to get permission to move that game to February 6.		West Jefferson Street Armory; Syracuse, NY
February 5, 1961*	at Siena	L 55–66	6–6	Gibbons Hall; Loudonville, NY
February 11, 1961*	at Saint Peter's	L 51–57	6–7	Jersey City Armory; Jersey City, NJ
February 14, 1961*	Fairfield	L 83–91	6–8	69th Regiment Armory; New York, NY
February 16, 1961*	at Yeshiva	W 91–68	7–8	Power Memorial Academy Gym
February 18, 1961*	Queens	W 81–69	8–8	69th Regiment Armory; New York, NY
February 21, 1961*	Pratt	L 65–66	8–9	14th Regiment Armory, Brooklyn; Brooklyn, NY
February 25, 1961*	at Iona	W 58–52	9–9	Mount St. Michael's Gymnasium; Bronx, NY
February 28, 1961	at C.C.N.Y	W 64–61	10–9 (2–1)	Wingate Gymnasium; New York, NY
March 4, 1961*; 7:30 pm	vs. Seton Hall	L 77–86	10–10	Madison Square Garden; New York, NY
*Non-conference game. ^{#}Rankings from AP Poll. (#) Tournament seedings in parentheses. All times are in Eastern Time.

== Middle Eastern College Athletic Association Tournament ==
The Terriers participated in the Middle Eastern College Athletic Association Tournament, which was hosted by Saint Peter's College at the Jersey City Armory. Consolation games other than the third-place game were played at the Saint Peter's gym. In the tournament, Le Moyne defeated Saint Peter's, Iona and Long Island to win. The Terriers finished sixth.

5th place
December 29 at Saint Peter's
St. Francis (NY)	95
Saint Peter's	108
7th place
December 29 at Saint Peter's
Siena	70
Wagner	68

5th–8th place Semifinals
December 28 at Saint Peter's
St. Francis (NY)	62
Siena	50
December 28 at Saint Peter's
Wagner	65
Saint Peter's	74

Quarterfinals
December 27 at the Armory
Fairleigh Dickinson	93
St. Francis (NY)	58
December 27 at the Armory
Long Island	58
Siena	55
December 27 at the Armory
Iona	61
Wagner	53
December 27 at the Armory
Saint Peter's	62
Le Moyne	64

Semifinals
December 28 at the Armory
Fairleigh Dickinson	50
Long Island	70
December 28 at the Armory
Iona	60
Le Moyne	90

Final
December 29 at the Armory
Long Island	57
Le Moyne	66
3rd place
December 29 at the Armory
Iona	58
Fairleigh Dickinson	77

== Awards ==
At the end of the season Richard Dreyer received an honorable-mention from the Metropolitan Basketball Writers Association.
