= 1965–66 St. Francis Terriers men's basketball team =

American college basketball season

1965–66 St. Francis Terriers men's basketball
- Conference: Metropolitan Collegiate Conference
- Record: 5–17 (0–9 MCC)
- Head coach: Daniel Lynch (18th season)
- Home arena: 69th Regiment Armory

1965–66 Metropolitan Collegiate Conference men's basketball standings
	Conf.				Overall
Team	W		L	PCT	W		L	PCT
Manhattan	8	–	1	.889	13	–	9	.591
LIU	7	–	2	.778	22	–	4	.846
NYU	7	–	2	.778	18	–	10	.643
Hofstra	6	–	3	.667	16	–	10	.615
Fairleigh Dickinson	5	–	4	.556	15	–	10	.600
Saint Peter's	5	–	4	.556	11	–	12	.478
Seton Hall	3	–	6	.333	6	–	18	.250
Iona	3	–	6	.333	5	–	16	.238
Wagner	1	–	8	.111	14	–	12	.538
St. Francis (NY)	0	–	9	.000	5	–	17	.227
Rankings from AP Poll

The 1965–66 St. Francis Terriers men's basketball team represented St. Francis College during the 1965–66 NCAA men's basketball season. The team was coached by Daniel Lynch, who was in his eighteenth year at the helm of the St. Francis Terriers. The Terriers played their homes games at the 69th Regiment Armory. This is the team's first year in the newly organized Metropolitan Collegiate Conference.

The Terriers finished the season at 5–17 overall and 0–9 in conference play.

== Roster ==
1965–66 St. Francis Brooklyn Terriers men's basketball team
Players
Coaches

Pos.	#	Name	Height	Weight	Year	Previous school	Hometown
F		Mark Turenshine	6 ft 5 in (1.96 m)	—	Sr	Sheepshead Bay High School
G		Jack Crispi	5 ft 10 in (1.78 m)	—	Sr
G		Alan Fisher	6 ft 2 in (1.88 m)	—	Jr
		Paul De Loca	6 ft 2 in (1.88 m)	—
		John Riddell	6 ft 3 in (1.91 m)	—
C		Gilbert Radday	6 ft 8 in (2.03 m)	—	Jr
		Paul McGuire	—	—
F		John McMahon	6 ft 2 in (1.88 m)	—	So
G		Michael Mahoney	6 ft 0 in (1.83 m)	—	So
F		Tom Raleigh	6 ft 3 in (1.91 m)	—
F		Doug Smith	6 ft 3 in (1.91 m)	—	So
		John Raferty	6 ft 2 in (1.88 m)	—

Head coach

- Daniel Lynch (St. Francis '38)

Assistant coach(es)

Legend

- (C) Team captain
- (S) Suspended
- (I) Ineligible
- (W) Walk-on
- Injured
- Current redshirt

== Schedule and results ==
Date time, TV	Opponent	Result	Record	Site city, state
Regular Season
December __, 1965*	Pace	W 101–54	1–0	
December 4, 1965*	at Bridgeport	W 102–83	2–0	Bridgeport, CT
December 8, 1965*	at King's (PA)	L 54–57	2–1	
December 11, 1965*	at No. 8 Providence	L 80–108	2–2	Alumni Hall; Providence, RI
December __, 1965*	Loyola (MD)	L 72–86	2–3	
December 18, 1965	at LIU	L 65–92	2–4 (0–1)	Schwartz Athletic Center (1,100); Brooklyn, NY
January 6, 1966*	Siena	W 118–74	3–4	69th Regiment Armory (300); New York, NY
January __, 1966	at Hofstra	L 86–99	3–5 (0–2)	
January 12, 1966	Fairleigh Dickinson	L 71–86	3–6 (0–3)	69th Regiment Armory; New York, NY
January 15, 1966*	at St. John's	L 66–92	3–7	Alumni Gymnasium (3,965); Jamaica, NY
January 26, 1966	at Wagner	L 79–93	3–8 (0–4)	69th Regiment Armory; New York, NY
January 29, 1966*	Adelphi	W 98–65	4–8	69th Regiment Armory; New York, NY
February 2, 1966	at Seton Hall	L 88–90	4–9 (0–5)	Walsh Gymnasium; South Orange, NJ
February 5, 1966*	Le Moyne	L 71–75 ^{OT}	4–10	69th Regiment Armory (350); New York, NY
February 9, 1966*	Fordham	L 62–65	4–11	69th Regiment Armory; New York, NY
February 12, 1966*	at Siena	W 96–79	5–11	Albany, NY
February 17, 1966*	Niagara	L 71–78	5–12	
February 19, 1966; WPIX	at NYU	L 75–100	5–13 (0–6)	Alumni Gymnasium (600); Bronx, NY
February 22, 1966*	C.C.N.Y.	L 53–68	5–14	69th Regiment Armory; New York, NY
February 26, 1966	Iona	L 58–80	5–15 (0–7)	(300)
March 3, 1966	vs. Manhattan	L 64–75	5–16 (0–8)	Madison Square Garden (3,714); New York, NY
March 5, 1966	Saint Peter's	L 85–95	5–17 (0–9)	69th Regiment Armory; New York, NY
*Non-conference game. ^{#}Rankings from AP Poll. (#) Tournament seedings in parentheses. All times are in Eastern Time.
