= 1958–59 St. Francis Terriers men's basketball team =

American college basketball season

1958–59 St. Francis Terriers men's basketball
- Conference: Metropolitan New York Conference
- Record: 5–18 (0–3 MTNY)
- Head coach: Daniel Lynch (11th season)
- Home arena: II Corps Artillery Armory

1958–59 Metropolitan New York Conference men's basketball standings
	Conf.				Overall
Team	W		L	PCT	W		L	PCT
Manhattan	4	–	0	1.000	15	–	6	.714
Brooklyn	3	–	1	.750	8	–	10	.444
St. John's	4	–	2	.667	20	–	6	.769
Fordham	2	–	2	.500	17	–	8	.680
NYU	2	–	2	.500	15	–	8	.652
CCNY	1	–	6	.143	6	–	12	.333
St. Francis (NY)	0	–	3	.000	5	–	18	.217
Rankings from AP Poll

The 1958–1959 St. Francis Terriers men's basketball team represented St. Francis College during the 1958–59 NCAA University Division men's basketball season. The team was coached by Daniel Lynch, who was in his eleventh year at the helm of the St. Francis Terriers. The team was a member of the Metropolitan New York Conference and played their home games at the II Corps Artillery Armory in Park Slope, Brooklyn.

The Terriers finished their season at 14–9 overall and 2–1 in conference play.

== Roster ==
1958–59 St. Francis Brooklyn Terriers men's basketball team
Players
Coaches

Pos.	#	Name	Height	Weight	Year	Previous school	Hometown
F	4	Terry Dugan	6 ft 4 in (1.93 m)	—	Sr
G		George Link	6 ft 0 in (1.83 m)	—	Sr
G		Joe Meudt	6 ft 0 in (1.83 m)	—	Sr
G		Joe Birmingham	6 ft 0 in (1.83 m)	—	Sr
F		Tony Krasnick	6 ft 3 in (1.91 m)	—	Jr
G		Fred Schneider	6 ft 0 in (1.83 m)	—	Jr
F		Pete Schweitzer	6 ft 5 in (1.96 m)	—	Jr
G		David Moriarty	5 ft 8 in (1.73 m)	—	Jr
F		Richard Dreyer	6 ft 2 in (1.88 m)	—	So	Aviation Trades High School
G		Henry O'Lee	6 ft 0 in (1.83 m)	—	So
G		Tom Rizzo	5 ft 11 in (1.8 m)	—

Head coach

- Daniel Lynch (St. Francis '38)

Assistant coach(es)

Legend

- (C) Team captain
- (S) Suspended
- (I) Ineligible
- (W) Walk-on
- Injured
- Current redshirt

Roster

== Schedule and results ==
Date time, TV	Opponent	Result	Record	Site city, state
Regular Season
December 3, 1959*	at C.W. Post	W 57–49	1–0	Brookville, NY
December 6, 1958*	at Yeshiva	L 64–67	1–1	High School of Fashion Trades; New York, NY
December 9, 1958*	Pace	W 67–66	2–1	II Corps Armory; Brooklyn, NY
December 13, 1958*	Providence	L 51–63	2–2	II Corps Armory; Brooklyn, NY
December 17, 1958*	at Adelphi	L 44–62	2–3	Garden City, New York
December 20, 1958*	at Loyola (Baltimore)	L 47–59	2–4	Baltimore, MD
January 3, 1959*	Siena	L 65–72 ^{3OT}	2–5	II Corps Armory; Brooklyn, NY
January 6, 1959	Brooklyn College	L 85–86	2–6 (0–1)	II Corps Armory; Brooklyn, NY
January 8, 1959*	at Saint Peter's	L 48–71	2–7	Jersey City Armory; Jersey City, NJ
January 10, 1959*	Queens	L 71–79	2–8	II Corps Armory; Brooklyn, NY
January 13, 1959*	Bridgeport	L 65–79	2–9	II Corps Armory; Brooklyn, NY
January 24, 1959	vs. No. 7 St. John's	L 44–91	2–10 (0–2)	69th Regiment Armory (3,000); New York, NY
January 27, 1959*	at Duquesne	L 50–87	2–11	Fitzgerald Field House; Pittsburgh, PA
January 28, 1959*	at No. 16 St. Bonaventure	L 56–74	2–12	Butler Gymnasium; Olean, NY
January 31, 1959*	at Le Moyne	L 61–74	2–13	Syracuse, NY
February 1, 1959*	at Siena	W 67–50	3–13	Washington Avenue Armory; Albany, NY
February 7, 1959	at CCNY	L 63–66	3–14 (0–3)	New York, NY
February 10, 1959*	Seton Hall	W 67–58	4–14	II Corps Armory; Brooklyn, NY
February 14, 1959*	at Holy Cross	L 68–81	4–15	Worcester Memorial Auditorium; Worcester, MA
February 17, 1959*	Fairleigh Dickinson	W 67–59	5–15	II Corps Armory; Brooklyn, NY
February 21, 1959*	Fairfield	L 66–76	5–16	II Corps Armory; Brooklyn, NY
February 26, 1959*	vs. Iona	L 58–65	5–17	Madison Square Garden; New York, NY
February 27, 1959*	Boston University	L 70–92	5–18	II Corps Armory; Brooklyn, NY
*Non-conference game. ^{#}Rankings from AP Poll. (#) Tournament seedings in parentheses. All times are in Eastern Time.
