= 1954–55 St. Francis Terriers men's basketball team =

American college basketball season

1954–55 St. Francis Terriers men's basketball

NAIA District 31 Champions
- Conference: Metropolitan New York Conference
- Record: 17–8 (3–3 Metropolitan New York Conference)
- Head coach: Daniel Lynch (7th season)
- Home arena: Butler Street Gymnasium; II Corps Artillery Armory

1954–55 Metropolitan New York Conference men's basketball standings
	Conf.				Overall
Team	W		L	PCT	W		L	PCT
Manhattan	6	–	0	1.000	18	–	5	.783
St. John's	5	–	11	.313	9	–	0	1.000
Fordham	3	–	2	.600	18	–	9	.667
St. Francis (NY)	3	–	3	.500	18	–	8	.692
Brooklyn	1	–	3	.250	7	–	11	.389
NYU	1	–	3	.250	7	–	13	.350
CCNY	0	–	6	.000	8	–	10	.444
Rankings from AP Poll

The 1954–1955 St. Francis Terriers men's basketball team represented St. Francis College during the 1954–55 NCAA Division I men's basketball season. The team was coached by Daniel Lynch, who was in his seventh year at the helm of the St. Francis Terriers. The team was a member of the Metropolitan New York Conference and played their home games at the Bulter Street Gymnasium in their Cobble Hill, Brooklyn campus and at the II Corps Artillery Armory in Park Slope, Brooklyn.

The team was a member of the Metropolitan New York Conference continuously since 1945, although the team first joined the conference in its inaugural year, 1933.

== Roster ==
1954–55 St. Francis Brooklyn Terriers men's basketball team
Players
Coaches

Pos.	#	Name	Height	Weight	Year	Previous school	Hometown
G		Frank Dentico (C)	5 ft 10 in (1.78 m)	—	Sr
G		Leo Keegan (C)	5 ft 10 in (1.78 m)	—	Sr
F		Elliott Preff	6 ft 2 in (1.88 m)	—	Sr
		Ed Crofton	—	—	Jr
		Jack Fitzgerald	—	—	Jr
F		Dan Mannix	6 ft 0 in (1.83 m)	—	Jr
G		Dan Smith	6 ft 3 in (1.91 m)	—	Jr
G		Jim Murphy	5 ft 11 in (1.8 m)	—	Jr
C		Ken Wilkins	6 ft 5 in (1.96 m)	—	Jr
C		Walter Adamushko	6 ft 6 in (1.98 m)	245 lb (111 kg)	So	Thomas Jefferson High School	Brooklyn, NY
C		George Fox	6 ft 2 in (1.88 m)	—	So
		Ed Meuger	6 ft 3 in (1.91 m)	—	So
C		Al Innis	6 ft 6 in (1.98 m)	—	Fr
G		Lester Yellin	6 ft 0 in (1.83 m)	—	Fr
G		Tony D'Elia	5 ft 11 in (1.8 m)	—	Fr

Head coach

- Daniel Lynch (St. Francis '38)

Assistant coach(es)

Legend

- (C) Team captain
- (S) Suspended
- (I) Ineligible
- (W) Walk-on
- Injured
- Current redshirt

== Schedule ==
Date time, TV	Opponent	Result	Record	Site city, state
Exhibition
November 27, 1954*; 8:30 pm	Alumni			Butler Street Gymnasium; Brooklyn, NY
Regular Season
December 1, 1954*; 8:30 pm	New Britain State Teachers College	W 97–57	1–0	Butler Street Gymnasium; Brooklyn, NY
December 4, 1954*	at Mount St. Mary's	L 84–99	1–1	Emmitsburg, MD
December 6, 1954*; 8:30 pm	Pace	W 97–45	2–1	Butler Street Gymnasium; Brooklyn, NY
December 11, 1954*; 8:30 pm	Providence	W 71–63	3–1	Butler Street Gymnasium; Brooklyn, NY
December 13, 1954*; 8:30 pm	Toronto	W 90–49	4–1	Second Corps Artillery Armory; Brooklyn, NY
December 17, 1954*; 7:30 pm	Chinese Nationalist Olympic Team; Exhibition	W 71–56	–	II Corps Armory; Brooklyn, NY
December 29, 1954*	at Loyola (Baltimore)	W 97–75	5–1	Baltimore, MD
January 5, 1955; 8:30 pm, WATV	at Fordham	L 59–64	5–2 (0–1)	Rose Hill Gymnasium (900); Bronx, NY
January 7, 1955; 8:30 pm, WATV	St. John's	L 71–80	5–3 (0–2)	II Corps Armory (3,200); Brooklyn, NY
January 10, 1955*; 8:30 pm	Fairleigh Dickinson	W 61–52	6–3	II Corps Armory (1,000); Brooklyn, NY
January 14, 1955*; 8:30 pm	Fairfield	W 70–64	7–3	II Corps Armory; Brooklyn, NY
January 22, 1955; 9:00 pm, WPIX	vs. Manhattan	L 69–73	7–4 (0–3)	69th Regiment Armory (2,500); New York, NY
January 26, 1955*; 8:30 pm	Siena	W 63–48	8–4	II Corps Armory; Brooklyn, NY
January 29, 1955*; 8:30 pm	Ithaca	W 94–70	9–4	II Corps Armory; Brooklyn, NY
February 1, 1955*	at No. 14 Holy Cross	L 56–82	9–5	Worcester, MA
February 5, 1955*	at Saint Peter's	W 79–61	10–5	Jersey City Armory; Jersey City, NJ
February 9, 1955; 8:30 pm, WATV	Queens	W 91–66	11–5 (1–3)	II Corps Armory; Brooklyn, NY
February 12, 1955	at CCNY	W 94–79	12–5 (2–3)	
February 16, 1955	Brooklyn College	W 81–67	13–5 (3–3)	II Corps Armory; Brooklyn, NY
February 19, 1955*	at St. Bonaventure	W 71–64	14–5	Buffalo Memorial Auditorium; Buffalo, NY
February 22, 1955*	Seton Hall	L 76–88	14–6	II Corps Armory; Brooklyn, NY
February 24, 1955*; 7:45 pm	vs. Iona	W 65–61	15–6	Madison Square Garden; New York, NY
February 26, 1955*	at Siena	L 55–61	15–7	Albany Armory (3,300); Albany, NY
NAIA Tournament
February 28, 1955*	at Saint Peter's; District 31 Semifinals	W 63–51	16–7	Dickinson H.S. Gymnasium; Jersey City, NJ
March 3, 1955*	vs. Panzer; District 31 Finals	W 80–70	17–7	Dickinson H.S. Gymnasium; Jersey City, NJ
March 8, 1955*	vs. Quincy (Ill.); First Round	L 82–84	17–8	Municipal Auditorium; Kansas City, MO
*Non-conference game. ^{#}Rankings from AP Poll. (#) Tournament seedings in parentheses. All times are in Eastern Time.
