= 1966–67 St. Francis Terriers men's basketball team =

American college basketball season

1966–67 St. Francis Terriers men's basketball

Metropolitan Collegiate Conference Champions
- Conference: Metropolitan Collegiate Conference
- Record: 15–8 (7–2 MCC)
- Head coach: Daniel Lynch (19th season)
- Home arena: 69th Regiment Armory

1966–67 Metropolitan Collegiate Conference men's basketball standings
	Conf.				Overall
Team	W		L	PCT	W		L	PCT
St. Francis (NY)	7	–	2	.778	15	–	8	.652
Saint Peter's	7	–	2	.778	18	–	6	.750
Manhattan	7	–	2	.778	13	–	8	.619
NYU	6	–	3	.667	10	–	16	.385
LIU	5	–	4	.556	22	–	7	.759
Wagner	4	–	5	.444	19	–	9	.679
Iona	4	–	5	.444	11	–	10	.524
Seton Hall	3	–	6	.333	7	–	17	.292
Hofstra	2	–	7	.222	12	–	13	.480
Fairleigh Dickinson	0	–	9	.000	4	–	19	.174
Rankings from AP Poll

The 1966–67 St. Francis Terriers men's basketball team represented St. Francis College during the 1966–67 NCAA men's basketball season. The team was coached by Daniel Lynch, who was in his nineteenth year at the helm of the St. Francis Terriers. The Terriers played their homes games at the 69th Regiment Armory and were members of the Metropolitan Collegiate Conference.

The Terriers finished the season at 15–8 overall and 7–2 in conference play. They were the Metropolitan Collegiate Conference Co-Champions, Saint Peter's and Manhattan College also produced 7–2 records in the conference. Going into the final week of the regular season, the Terriers, as underdogs and on the road, faced Saint Peter's, which was selected for the 1967 NIT. The Terriers were able to defeat Saint Peter's and produce the three-way tie for first place in the MCC.

Against Siena on January 7, Alan Fisher set the Terrier record for most points in a game with 42. Then on February 10, also against Siena, Fisher set a new record with 44 points.

== Roster ==
1966–67 St. Francis Brooklyn Terriers men's basketball team
Players
Coaches

Pos.	#	Name	Height	Weight	Year	Hometown
G		Alan Fisher	6 ft 3 in (1.91 m)	—	Sr
C		Gilbert Radday	6 ft 8 in (2.03 m)	—	Sr
F		John Raferty	6 ft 2 in (1.88 m)	—	Jr	Queens, New York
F		John McMahon	6 ft 2 in (1.88 m)	—	Jr
G		Michael Mahoney	6 ft 0 in (1.83 m)	—	Jr
F		Doug Smith	6 ft 3 in (1.91 m)	—	Jr
F		Bob Christie	6 ft 3 in (1.91 m)	—	So
G		George Gillen	5 ft 9 in (1.75 m)	—
		Tom Cummins	6 ft 1 in (1.85 m)	—
		Bernie Donaghue	6 ft 0 in (1.83 m)	—

Head coach

- Daniel Lynch (St. Francis '38)

Assistant coach(es)

Legend

- (C) Team captain
- (S) Suspended
- (I) Ineligible
- (W) Walk-on
- Injured
- Current redshirt

== Schedule and results ==
Date time, TV	Opponent	Result	Record	Site city, state
Regular Season
December 3, 1966*	Pace	W 79–72	1–0	Bishop Ford High School; Brooklyn, NY
December 7, 1966*	King's (PA)	W 93–54	2–0	69th Regiment Armory (400); New York, NY
December 10, 1966*	Providence	L 62–72	2–1	69th Regiment Armory; New York, NY
December 14, 1966*	at UConn	L 65–81	2–2	Hugh S. Greer Field House (3,541); Storrs, CT
December 17, 1966	LIU	W 78–75 ^{2OT}	3–2 (1–0)	69th Regiment Armory; New York, NY
December 20, 1966*	at Fordham	L 65–66	3–3	Rose Hill Gymnasium (2,615); Bronx, NY
January 4, 1967	Hofstra	W 88–78	4–3 (2–0)	69th Regiment Armory; New York, NY
January 6, 1965*	at Queens	W 91–57	5–3	Fitzgerald Gymnasium; Flushing, NY
January 7, 1967*	Siena	W 114–81	6–3	69th Regiment Armory; New York, NY
January 11, 1967	NYU	W 95–90	7–3 (3–0)	69th Regiment Armory (800); New York, NY
January 14, 1967*	at St. John's	L 71–95	7–4	Alumni Gymnasium (5,800); Jamaica, NY
January 25, 1967	Manhattan	L 64–76	7–5 (3–1)	69th Regiment Armory (1,200); New York, NY
January 28, 1967*	at Adelphi	W 84–79 ^{OT}	8–5	Garden City, NY
February 4, 1967; 8:30 pm	at Wagner	L 71–83	8–6 (3–2)	Sutter Gymnasium; Staten Island, NY
February 10, 1967*	at Siena	W 84–66	9–6	Gibbons Hall; Loudonville, NY
February 11, 1967*	at Le Moyne	L 62–73	9–7	Le Moyne Athletic Center (1,800); DeWitt, NY
February 15, 1967	Seton Hall	W 98–88	10–7 (4–2)	69th Regiment Armory (200); New York, NY
February 19, 1967*	Niagara	W 81–72	11–7	Bishop Ford High School (600); Brooklyn, NY
February 22, 1967*; 8:00 pm	at C.C.N.Y.	L 70–76	11–8	Wingate Gymnasium; New York, NY
February 25, 1967	at Fairleigh Dickinson	W 95–83	12–8 (5–2)	Rutherford, NJ
March 1, 1967	at Iona	W 75–65	13–8 (6–2)	Mount St. Michael's High School (750); Bronx, NY
March 4, 1967	at Saint Peter's	W 92–85	14–8 (7–2)	Jersey City Armory (3,863); Jersey City, NJ
*Non-conference game. ^{#}Rankings from AP Poll. (#) Tournament seedings in parentheses. All times are in Eastern Time.
