= 1951–52 St. Francis Terriers men's basketball team =

American college basketball season

1951–52 St. Francis Terriers men's basketball

National Catholic Invitation Tournament 3rd Place Game, L 50–64
- Conference: Metropolitan New York Conference
- Record: 20–8 (4–2 Metropolitan New York Conference)
- Head coach: Daniel Lynch (4th season)
- Assistant coach: Marty O'Donnell
- Home arena: Butler Street Gymnasium; II Corps Artillery Armory

1951–52 Metropolitan New York Conference men's basketball standings
	Conf.				Overall
Team	W		L	PCT	W		L	PCT
No. 10 St. John's	6	–	0	1.000	25	–	6	.806
St. Francis (NY)	4	–	2	.667	20	–	8	.714
Manhattan	4	–	2	.667	12	–	9	.571
Fordham	3	–	3	.500	20	–	8	.714
NYU	2	–	3	.400	17	–	8	.680
CCNY	1	–	5	.167	8	–	11	.421
Brooklyn	0	–	5	.000	9	–	7	.563
Rankings from AP Poll

The 1951–1952 St. Francis Terriers men's basketball team represented St. Francis College during the 1951–52 NCAA Division I men's basketball season. The team was coached by Daniel Lynch, who was in his fourth year at the helm of the St. Francis Terriers. The team was a member of the Metropolitan New York Conference. The Terriers played their home games at the Bulter Street Gymnasium in their Cobble Hill, Brooklyn campus and at the II Corps Artillery Armory in Park Slope, Brooklyn.

On February 2, 1952, against Seton Hall, the Terriers played in the first quadruple overtime game in New York City history, both collegiate and professional. The Terriers triumphed 82–70.

== Roster ==
1951–52 St. Francis Brooklyn Terriers men's basketball team
Players
Coaches

Pos.	#	Name	Height	Weight	Year	Hometown
		Martin Conway	6 ft 3 in (1.91 m)	—	Sr
G		Ray Rudzinski (C)	6 ft 0 in (1.83 m)	—	Sr
F		Vern Stokes	6 ft 2 in (1.88 m)	—	Jr
		Frank Sainato	5 ft 8 in (1.73 m)	—	Jr
G		George Searing	5 ft 11 in (1.8 m)	—	So
C		Hank Daubenschmidt	6 ft 7 in (2.01 m)	—	So	Bronx, NY
F		Jack Walsh	6 ft 4 in (1.93 m)	—	So
G		Frank Dentico	5 ft 9 in (1.75 m)	—	Fr
C		Jack Prenderville	6 ft 4 in (1.93 m)	—
G		Marty Donohue	6 ft 3 in (1.91 m)	—
F		Tom Coogan	6 ft 4 in (1.93 m)	—
		Bob Goeller	5 ft 11 in (1.8 m)	—
		Bob Keith	6 ft 2 in (1.88 m)	—

Head coach

- Daniel Lynch (St. Francis '38)

Assistant coach(es)

Marty O'Donnell

Legend

- (C) Team captain
- (S) Suspended
- (I) Ineligible
- (W) Walk-on
- Injured
- Current redshirt

== Schedule ==
Date time, TV	Opponent	Result	Record	Site city, state
Regular Season
November 16, 1951*	Alumni	W 91–41	1–0	Butler Campus Gymnasium; Brooklyn, New York
November 29, 1951*	Fort Monmouth	W 80–49	2–0	Butler Campus Gymnasium; Brooklyn, New York
December 1, 1951*	at Connecticut	W 77–69	3–0	Hawley Armory; Storrs, Connecticut
December 5, 1951	NYU	L 58–59	3–1 (0–1)	II Corps Artillery Armory (3,000); Brooklyn, New York
December 7, 1951	Le Moyne	W 56–51	4–1	II Corps Artillery Armory; Brooklyn, New York
December 15, 1951*	Yeshiva	W 66–38	5–1	II Corps Artillery Armory; Brooklyn, New York
December 22, 1951*	at Adelphi	W 66–50	6–1	Garden City, New York
December 26, 1951	Fordham	W 54–52	7–1 (1–1)	II Corps Artillery Armory (4,000); Brooklyn, New York
December 29, 1951*	Illinois Wesleyan	W 67–48	8–1	II Corps Artillery Armory; Brooklyn, New York
January 2, 1952*	Loyola (Baltimore)	W 69–60	9–1	II Corps Artillery Armory; Brooklyn, New York
January 4, 1952*	at Kings College	W 78–54	10–1	Kingston, Pennsylvania
January 5, 1952*	at Muhlenberg College	W 72–64	11–1	Rockne Hall (2,400); Allentown, Pennsylvania
January 12, 1952*	at Westminster	L 52–63	11–2	New Wilmington, Pennsylvania
January 13, 1952	at Saint Francis (PA)	L 65–72	11–3	Lorreto, Pennsylvania
January 19, 1952	at St. John's	L 36–54	11–4 (1–2)	69th Regiment Armory; New York, New York
January 30, 1952	at No. 11 Seton Hall	L 60–70	11–5	(3,000); South Orange, New Jersey
February 1, 1952; 3:00 pm	at Manhattan	W 82–70 ^{4OT}	12–5 (2–2)	69th Regiment Armory; New York, New Yorks
February 6, 1952	Iona	W 64–58 ^{OT}	13–5	II Corps Artillery Armory; Brooklyn, New York
February 8, 1952*	at Fairfield	W 66–49	14–5	Bridgeport, Connecticut
February 9, 1952*	at New Britain State Teachers College	W 61–46	15–5	New Britain, Connecticut
February 16, 1952	at Saint Peter's	W 91–64	16–5	Jersey City Armory; Jersey City, New Jersey
February 20, 1952	CCNY	W 71–56	17–5 (3–2)	Columbus Council, Knights of Columbus Clubhouse; Brooklyn, New York
February 23, 1952	at No. 18 Siena	L 43–52	17–6	Albany, New York
February 26, 1952	at Brooklyn College	W 61–51	18–6 (4–2)	Roosevelt Gymnasium; Brooklyn, New York
March 5, 1952*	Connecticut	W 63–47	19–6	II Corps Artillery Armory; Brooklyn, New York
1952 National Catholic Invitation Tournament
March 18, 1949*	vs. Le Moyne; Second Round	W 75–61	20–6	RPI Field House (4,000); Troy, New York
March 20, 1949*	vs. Marquette; Semifinals	L 57–79	20–7	RPI Field House (4,000); Troy, New York
March 22, 1949*	vs. Siena; Consolation Game	L 50–64	20–8	RPI Field House; Troy, New York
*Non-conference game. ^{#}Rankings from AP Poll. (#) Tournament seedings in parentheses. All times are in Eastern Time.

== National Catholic Invitation Tournament ==
St. Francis, the defending champions was selected as the 4th seed in the NCIT. The tournament took place at Rensselaer Polytechnic Institute Field House in Troy, New York, from March 15 to March 22.

First round
Scranton	85
Saint Mary's (MN)	78
Saint Francis (PA)	66
Loyola (MD)	52
Iona	68
Gannon (PA)	52
Le Moyne	67
Providence	63

Quarter-finals
(1 seed) Siena	79
Scranton	57
(3 seed) Saint Joseph's	56
Saint Francis (PA)	65
(2 seed) Marquette	66
Iona	59
(4 seed) St. Francis (NY)	75
Le Moyne	61

Semi-finals
Saint Francis (PA)	54
Siena	51
Marquette	79
St. Francis (NY)	57

Final
Marquette	76
Saint Francis (PA)	64
Third place
Siena	64
St. Francis (NY)	50

== Awards ==
- Vernon Stokes

All-Metropolitan Selection by the Metropolitan Basketball Writers Association
