= 1967–68 St. Francis Terriers men's basketball team =

American college basketball season

1967–68 St. Francis Terriers men's basketball
- Conference: Metropolitan Collegiate Conference
- Record: 7–16 (0–8 MCC)
- Head coach: Daniel Lynch (20th season)
- Home arena: 69th Regiment Armory

1967–68 Metropolitan Collegiate Conference men's basketball standings
	Conf.				Overall
Team	W		L	PCT	W		L	PCT
Saint Peter's	8	–	0	1.000	24	–	4	.857
LIU	7	–	1	.875	22	–	2	.917
Wagner	5	–	3	.625	21	–	8	.724
Iona	4	–	4	.500	13	–	9	.591
Fairleigh Dickinson	4	–	4	.500	10	–	12	.455
Seton Hall	4	–	4	.500	9	–	15	.375
Manhattan	3	–	5	.375	8	–	14	.364
Hofstra	1	–	7	.125	13	–	12	.520
St. Francis (NY)	0	–	8	.000	7	–	16	.304
Rankings from AP Poll

The 1967–68 St. Francis Terriers men's basketball team represented St. Francis College during the 1967–68 NCAA men's basketball season. The team was coached by Daniel Lynch, who was in his twentieth year at the helm of the St. Francis Terriers. The Terriers played their homes games at the 69th Regiment Armory and were members of the Metropolitan Collegiate Conference.

The Terriers finished the season at 7–16 overall and 0–8 in conference play. After the season, the Terriers left the Metropolitan Collegiate Conference and would play as Independents from 1968 until 1981, before joining the ECAC Metro Conference.

== Roster ==
1967–68 St. Francis Brooklyn Terriers men's basketball team
Players
Coaches

Pos.	#	Name	Height	Weight	Year	Hometown
F		John Raferty	6 ft 3 in (1.91 m)	—	Sr	Queens, New York
G		Michael Mahoney (C)	6 ft 0 in (1.83 m)	—	Sr
F		Doug Smith	6 ft 3 in (1.91 m)	—	Sr
F		John McMahon (injured)	6 ft 2 in (1.88 m)	—	Sr
C		Ed Grant	6 ft 4 in (1.93 m)	—	Jr
F		Bob Christie	6 ft 3 in (1.91 m)	—	Jr
G		John Conforti	6 ft 0 in (1.83 m)	—	So
F		Jim Sullivan	6 ft 3 in (1.91 m)	—	So
F		Frank Jones	6 ft 2 in (1.88 m)	—	So
C		Dan Gallagher (injured)	6 ft 6 in (1.98 m)	—	So

Head coach

- Daniel Lynch (St. Francis '38)

Assistant coach(es)

Legend

- (C) Team captain
- (S) Suspended
- (I) Ineligible
- (W) Walk-on
- Injured
- Current redshirt

== Schedule and results ==
Date time, TV	Opponent	Result	Record	Site city, state
Regular Season
December 2, 1967*	Pace	W 90–68	1–0	Bishop Ford High School; Brooklyn, NY
December 6, 1967*	at King's (PA)	W 68–64	2–0	Wilkes-Barre, PA
December 9, 1967*	at Providence	L 66–80	2–1	Alumni Hall; Providence, RI
December 13, 1967*	UConn	W 82–62	3–1	69th Regiment Armory (600); New York, NY
December 20, 1967*	Fordham	L 64–85	3–2	69th Regiment Armory (1,000); New York, NY
December 22, 1967	at LIU	L 42–76	3–3 (0–1)	Founders Hall (1,000); Brooklyn, NY
December 28, 1967*	vs. Bucknell; Le Moyne Christmas Tournament	L 81–84	3–4	Le Moyne Athletic Center; DeWitt, NY
December 29, 1967*	vs. Vermont; Le Moyne Christmas Tournament	W 72–66	4–4	Le Moyne Athletic Center; DeWitt, NY
January 3, 1968	at Hofstra	L 67–89	4–5 (0–2)	Hempstead, NY
January 6, 1968*	Le Moyne	W 72–64	5–5	69th Regiment Armory; New York, NY
January 10, 1968	at Wagner	L 79–93	5–6 (0–3)	69th Regiment Armory (400); New York, NY
January 13, 1968*	at St. John's	L 50–83	5–7	Alumni Gymnasium (3,357); Jamaica, NY
January 20, 1968	vs. Manhattan	L 64–83	5–8 (0–4)	Madison Square Garden; New York, NY
January 27, 1968*	Adelphi	L 89–94	5–9	69th Regiment Armory (300); New York, NY
January 30, 1968	at Seton Hall	L 46–82	5–10 (0–5)	Walsh Gymnasium; South Orange, NJ
January 31, 1968*	Siena	W 69–68	6–10	Bishop Ford High School; Brooklyn, NY
February 7, 1968*	Queens	L 79–90	6–11	69th Regiment Armory; New York, NY
February 10, 1968*	at Niagara	L 73–100	6–12	Gallagher Center; Niagara Falls, NY
February 17, 1968	Iona	L 45–84	6–13 (0–6)	69th Regiment Armory (600); New York, NY
February 22, 1968*	C.C.N.Y.	W 77–60	7–13	69th Regiment Armory (400); New York, NY
February 24, 1968*	Siena	L 86–95 ^{OT}	7–14	69th Regiment Armory; New York, NY
February 28, 1968	Fairleigh Dickinson	L 66–70	7–15 (0–7)	69th Regiment Armory; New York, NY
March 2, 1968	Saint Peter's	L 75–97	7–16 (0–8)	69th Regiment Armory; New York, NY
*Non-conference game. ^{#}Rankings from AP Poll. (#) Tournament seedings in parentheses. All times are in Eastern Time.
