= 1957–58 St. Francis Terriers men's basketball team =

American college basketball season

1957–58 St. Francis Terriers men's basketball
- Conference: Metropolitan New York Conference
- Record: 14–9 (2–1 MTNY)
- Head coach: Daniel Lynch (10th season)
- Home arena: II Corps Artillery Armory

1957–58 Metropolitan New York Conference men's basketball standings
	Conf.				Overall
Team	W		L	PCT	W		L	PCT
St. John's	6	–	0	1.000	18	–	8	.692
Manhattan	3	–	1	.750	16	–	10	.615
St. Francis (NY)	2	–	1	.667	14	–	9	.609
NYU	2	–	2	.500	10	–	11	.476
CCNY	2	–	5	.286	9	–	8	.529
Fordham	1	–	3	.250	15	–	9	.625
Brooklyn	0	–	4	.000	11	–	7	.611
Rankings from AP Poll

The 1957–1958 St. Francis Terriers men's basketball team represented St. Francis College during the 1957–58 NCAA University Division men's basketball season. The team was coached by Daniel Lynch, who was in his tenth year at the helm of the St. Francis Terriers. The team was a member of the Metropolitan New York Conference and played their home games at the II Corps Artillery Armory in Park Slope, Brooklyn.

The Terriers finished their season at 14–9 overall and 2–1 in conference play.

During the season, Lester Yellin became the sixth player to join the Terrier 1,000 point club. It occurred against Pace on February 8, 1958. Yellin went on to become the Terrier head coach from 1969–73, taking the reins after Lynch retired. Against Ithaca, Anthony D'Elia also joined the 1,000 point club- he was the fifth member.

In the 1958 NBA draft, senior Alvin Innis was selected with the 40th overall pick by the Minneapolis Lakers. During his senior year, Innis was second in the country with 24.8% rebound percentage.

== Roster ==
1957–58 St. Francis Brooklyn Terriers men's basketball team
Players
Coaches

Pos.	#	Name	Height	Weight	Year	Hometown
C	20	Al Innis (C)	6 ft 7 in (2.01 m)	—	Sr
G		Lester Yellin (C)	6 ft 0 in (1.83 m)	—	Sr
G		Anthony D'Elia (C)	5 ft 11 in (1.8 m)	—	Sr
G		Ed Aquilone	5 ft 10 in (1.78 m)	—	Sr
F	34	Bob Duane	6 ft 3 in (1.91 m)	—	Sr
F	4	Terry Dugan	6 ft 4 in (1.93 m)	—	Jr
F		Tony Krasnick	6 ft 3 in (1.91 m)	—	So
G		Fred Schneider	6 ft 0 in (1.83 m)	—	So
F		Pete Schweitzer	6 ft 5 in (1.96 m)	—	So
G		George Link	6 ft 0 in (1.83 m)	—	Jr
G		David Moriarty	5 ft 8 in (1.73 m)	—	So
		Jonathan Greene	6 ft 1 in (1.85 m)	—	Sr
G		Joe Meudt	6 ft 0 in (1.83 m)	—	Jr
		Jim Griffin	6 ft 2 in (1.88 m)	—	Sr
G		Joe Birmingham	6 ft 0 in (1.83 m)	—	Jr

Head coach

- Daniel Lynch (St. Francis '38)

Assistant coach(es)

Legend

- (C) Team captain
- (S) Suspended
- (I) Ineligible
- (W) Walk-on
- Injured
- Current redshirt

Roster

== Schedule and results ==
Date time, TV	Opponent	Result	Record	Site city, state
Regular Season
December 3, 1957*	Yeshiva	W 85–69	1–0	II Corps Armory (2,000); Brooklyn, NY
December 7, 1957*	Loyola (Baltimore)	W 79–56	2–0	II Corps Armory (2,500); Brooklyn, NY
December __, 1957*	Adelphi	W 85–69	3–0	
December 13, 1957*	at Providence	L 58–71	3–1	Alumni Hall; Providence, RI
December 21, 1957*	Ithaca	W 69–59	4–1	II Corps Armory; Brooklyn, NY
January 4, 1958*	Siena	W 82–66	5–1	II Corps Armory; Brooklyn, NY
January 7, 1958*	Saint Peter's	L 66–92	5–2	II Corps Armory (2,000); Brooklyn, NY
January 10, 1958	at Brooklyn College	W 86–65	6–2 (1–0)	Roosevelt Gymnasium; Brooklyn, NY
January , 1958*	at Fairleigh Dickinson	W 72–63	7–2	Rutherford, NJ
January 18, 1958*	St. Bonaventure	L 61–74	7–3	II Corps Armory; Brooklyn, NY
January 25, 1958	No. 13 St. John's	L 53–64	7–4 (1–1)	II Corps Armory (4,268); Brooklyn, NY
January 27, 1958*	at Seton Hall	L 74–79	7–5	
January 29, 1958*	at Duquesne	L 58–66	7–6	Fitzgerald Field House; Pittsburgh, PA
February 2, 1958*	at Siena	W 65–48	8–6	Washington Avenue Armory; Albany, NY
February 4, 1958	CCNY	W 52–47	9–6(2–1)	II Corps Armory (2,000); Brooklyn, NY
February 8, 1958*	Pace	W 98–67	10–6	II Corps Armory; Brooklyn, NY
February 14, 1958*	at Bridgeport	W 82–69	11–6	Bridgeport, CT
February 15, 1958*	at Holy Cross	L 60–88	11–7	Worcester Memorial Auditorium; Worcester, MA
February __, 1958*	Fairfield	L 73–81	11–8	
February 22, 1958*	Le Moyne	W 86–73	12–8	II Corps Armory; Brooklyn, NY
February 24, 1957*	Brandeis	W 84–74	13–8	II Corps Armory; Brooklyn, NY
February 27, 1957*	vs. Iona	L 77–82 ^{2OT}	13–9	Madison Square Garden (4,018); New York, NY
March 1, 1958*	at Queens	W 92–77	14–9	Queens, NY
*Non-conference game. ^{#}Rankings from AP Poll. (#) Tournament seedings in parentheses. All times are in Eastern Time.

== NBA draft ==
At the end of the season Alvin Inniss was selected with the 40th overall pick by the Minneapolis Lakers.

== Awards ==
- Anthony D'Elia

All-Metropolitan selection by the Metropolitan Basketball Writers’ Association

- Alvin Innniss

All-Metropolitan Selection by the Metropolitan Basketball Writers’ Association.
