= 1962–63 St. Francis Terriers men's basketball team =

American college basketball season

1962–63 St. Francis Terriers men's basketball

NIT First Round vs. Miami, L 70–71
- Conference: Metropolitan New York Conference
- Record: 16–7 (4–2 MTNY)
- Head coach: Daniel Lynch (15th season)
- Home arena: 69th Regiment Armory

1962–63 Metropolitan New York Conference men's basketball standings
	Conf.				Overall
Team	W		L	PCT	W		L	PCT
Fordham	4	–	1	.800	18	–	8	.692
No. 9 NYU	3	–	1	.750	18	–	5	.783
St. Francis (NY)	4	–	2	.667	16	–	7	.696
St. John's	2	–	2	.500	9	–	15	.375
CCNY	1	–	2	.333	8	–	10	.444
Brooklyn	0	–	2	.000	6	–	12	.333
Manhattan	0	–	4	.000	9	–	14	.391
Rankings from AP Poll

The 1962–63 St. Francis Terriers men's basketball team represented St. Francis College during the 1962–63 NCAA men's basketball season. The team was coached by Daniel Lynch, who was in his fifteenth year at the helm of the St. Francis Terriers. The team was a member of the Metropolitan New York Conference and played their home games at the 69th Regiment Armory in Manhattan.

The Terriers finished the season at 16–7 overall and 4–2 in conference play. The Terriers participated in the 1963 National Invitation Tournament. St. Francis and Fordham were the only local teams to be invited. They lost in the first round to Miami, 70–71. It was a match-up of the second-best offense in the country, Miami, against the fourth-best defense in the country, St. Francis. The Terriers almost pulled off the upset.

== Roster ==
1962–63 St. Francis Brooklyn Terriers men's basketball team
Players
Coaches

Pos.	#	Name	Height	Weight	Year	Previous school	Hometown
F	14	James Raferty	6 ft 3 in (1.91 m)	—	Sr
G	1	Ray Nash	6 ft 0 in (1.83 m)	—	Sr	St. Francis Preparatory School
F	44	Tom Kurowski	6 ft 1 in (1.85 m)	—	Jr
C	40	Ted Kotch	6 ft 8 in (2.03 m)	—	So
G	30	Richie Alexander	5 ft 11 in (1.8 m)	—	Jr
	54	Charlie Novak	—	—
	50	Frank Pascuzzi	—	—
	42	John O'Boyle	5 ft 9 in (1.75 m)	—	Jr
G	24	Jim Rishe	5 ft 10 in (1.78 m)	—	Jr
	32	Paul Buckley	5 ft 10 in (1.78 m)	—	Jr
		Lou Boggiano	—	—
	10	Rich Marquardt	—	—
F		Ed Lein	6 ft 5 in (1.96 m)	—
F		George Steinman	6 ft 4 in (1.93 m)	—

Head coach

- Daniel Lynch (St. Francis '38)

Assistant coach(es)

Legend

- (C) Team captain
- (S) Suspended
- (I) Ineligible
- (W) Walk-on
- Injured
- Current redshirt

== Schedule and results ==
Date time, TV	Opponent	Result	Record	Site city, state
Regular Season
December 1, 1962*	Hunter	W 84–46	1–0	69th Regiment Armory; New York, NY
December 5, 1962	Brooklyn	W 70–52	2–0 (1–0)	69th Regiment Armory; New York, NY
December 8, 1962*	Fairfield	W 57–54	3–0	69th Regiment Armory; New York, NY
December 12, 1962*	Bridgeport	W 81–67	4–0	69th Regiment Armory; New York, NY
December 15, 1962*	Providence	L 67–68	4–1	69th Regiment Armory; New York, NY
January 3, 1963*	at Adelphi	W 79–47	5–1	
January 5, 1963*	Siena	W 72–52	6–1	69th Regiment Armory; New York, NY
January 9, 1963*	Villanova	W 51–48	7–1	69th Regiment Armory; New York, NY
January 12, 1963*	at Pace	W 72–47	8–1	New York, NY
January 16, 1963*	Loyola (MD)	W 83–65	9–1	69th Regiment Armory; New York, NY
January 19, 1963	at St. John's	L 52–53	9–2 (1–1)	Alumni Gymnasium; Jamaica, NY
January 26, 1963	at Fordham	W 59–46	10–2 (2–1)	Rose Hill Gymnasium; Bronx, NY
January 31, 1963	at C.C.N.Y.	W 61–57	11–2 (3–1)	Wingate Gymnasium; New York, NY
February 2, 1963*	at Le Moyne	L 64–65 ^{OT}	11–3	Le Moyne Activity Center; DeWitt, NY
February 3, 1963*	at Siena	L 51–56	11–4	Washington Avenue Armory; Albany, NY
February 7, 1963*	at Queens	W 83–54	12–4	Fitzgerald Gymnasium; Flushing, NY
February 9, 1963*	King's (PA)	W 85–68	13–4	69th Regiment Armory; New York, NY
February 13, 1963	Manhattan	W 61–46	14–4 (4–1)	69th Regiment Armory; New York, NY
February 16, 1963*	at Saint Peter's	W 71–65	15–4	Jersey City Armory; Jersey City, NJ
February 23, 1963	No. 10 NYU	L 62–76	15–5 (4–2)	69th Regiment Armory; New York, NY
February 27, 1963*	Seton Hall	L 60–71	15–6	69th Regiment Armory; New York, NY
March 2, 1963*	at Iona	W 63–59	16–6	Joseph E. O'Connell Memorial Gymnasium; New Rochelle, NY
National Invitation Tournament
March 16, 1963*; 3:30 pm	vs. Miami; First Round	L 70–71	16–7	Madison Square Garden; New York, NY
*Non-conference game. ^{#}Rankings from AP Poll. (#) Tournament seedings in parentheses. All times are in Eastern Time.

== 1963 National Invitation Tournament ==
Below is the tournament bracket.

First round
Villanova	63
DePaul	51
Memphis	70
Fordham	49
Miami (FL)	71
St. Francis (NY)	70
Saint Louis	63
La Salle	61

Quarterfinals
Villanova	54
Wichita State	53
Canisius	76
Memphis	67
Miami (FL)	96
Providence	106
Marquette	84
Saint Louis	49

Semifinals
Villanova	46
Canisius	61
Providence	70
Marquette	64

Finals
Canisius	66
Providence	81

Third place game
Villanova	58
Marquette	66
