= 1948–49 St. Francis Terriers men's basketball team =

American college basketball season

1948–49 St. Francis Terriers men's basketball

National Catholic Invitation Tournament Finals vs. Regis, L 47–51
- Conference: Metropolitan New York Conference
- Record: 21–12 (2–2 MTNY)
- Head coach: Daniel Lynch (1st season)
- Home arena: 14th Regiment Armory

1948–49 Metropolitan New York Conference men's basketball standings
	Conf.				Overall
Team	W		L	PCT	W		L	PCT
Manhattan	5	–	1	.833	18	–	8	.692
St. John's	5	–	1	.833	15	–	9	.625
CCNY	3	–	2	.600	17	–	8	.680
NYU	3	–	2	.600	12	–	8	.600
St. Francis (NY)	2	–	2	.500	21	–	12	.636
Fordham	1	–	5	.167	9	–	16	.360
Brooklyn	0	–	6	.000	8	–	14	.364
Rankings from AP Poll

The 1948–49 St. Francis Terriers men's basketball team represented St. Francis College during the 1948–49 NCAA men's basketball season. The team was coached by Daniel Lynch, who was in his first year at the helm of the St. Francis Terriers. The team was a member of the Metropolitan New York Conference and hosted their home games at the 14th Regiment Armory.

The 1948–49 Terriers became the first team in the New York City area to have a game televised, they defeated Seton Hall in its inaugural telecast on WPIX. St. Francis finished the season at 20–13 overall and 2–2 in conference play. They also participated in their second National Catholic Invitation Tournament, where they lost in the finals to Regis 47–51.

Tom Gallagher scored 496 points during the season, which was reported to be new record for a player from the New York Metropolitan Area. In addition, Tom Gallagher, Tom O'Connor, and Paul Labanowski were named to the National Catholic Invitation Tournament All-Tournament Team.

== Roster ==
1948–49 St. Francis Brooklyn Terriers men's basketball team
Players
Coaches

Pos.	#	Name	Height	Weight	Year	Previous school	Hometown
		Tom Gallagher	—	—
		Tom O'Connor	—	—
		Paul Labanowski	—	—
F		Roy Reardon	6 ft 1 in (1.85 m)	—	So
G		Steve Ellsworth	5 ft 10 in (1.78 m)	—	So	St. Michael's High School
G		James Luisi (C)	6 ft 2 in (1.88 m)	—	So	Benjamin Franklin High School	East Harlem, New York
		Bill Paterno	—	—
		Roy Titus	—	—
G		Levi Bough	5 ft 11 in (1.8 m)	—
		John Nove	—	—
		Tome Gargiulo	—	—
		Tom McNiff	—	—
		Ray Riley	—	—
C		Dick Joyce	6 ft 3 in (1.91 m)	—

Head coach

- Daniel Lynch (St. Francis '38)

Assistant coach(es)

Legend

- (C) Team captain
- (S) Suspended
- (I) Ineligible
- (W) Walk-on
- Injured
- Current redshirt

== Schedule and results ==
Date time, TV	Opponent	Result	Record	Site city, state
Regular Season
December 3, 1948*	American	W 66–47	1–0	14th Regiment Armory; Brooklyn, NY
December 6, 1948*	at John Marshall	W 69–53	2–0	
December 8, 1948*	at Villanova	L 48–64	2–1	(1,800); Villanova, PA
December 10, 1948	Manhattan	L 52–56	2–2 (0–1)	14th Regiment Armory; Brooklyn, NY
December 13, 1948*	at Paterson State Teachers	W 75–59	3–2	Paterson Armory; Paterson, NJ
December 15, 1948*	Siena	W 43–33	4–2	14th Regiment Armory (1,500); Brooklyn, NY
December 17, 1948*	Geneva	W 66–51	5–2	14th Regiment Armory; Brooklyn, NY
December 22, 1948*	at Iona	W 62–57	6–2	Westchester County Center (2,000); White Plains, NY
December 29, 1948*	at NY Athletic Club	L 62–65	6–3	
January 5, 1949*	at Brooklyn College	W 55–45	7–3 (1–1)	Roosevelt Gymnasium (800); Brooklyn, NY
January 8, 1949*	vs. Boston College	W 63–52	8–3	14th Regiment Armory; Brooklyn, NY
January 10, 1949*	at Duquesne	L 62–75	8–4	Duquesne Gardens; Pittsburgh, PA
January 12, 1949*	at Cincinnati	L 48–65	8–5	Cincinnati Music Hall; Cincinnati, OH
January 15, 1949*	vs. Adelphi	W 78–56	9–5	Garden City, NY
January 22, 1949*	at Fairfield	W 66–42	10–5	Bridgeport, CT
January 26, 1949*	vs. Providence	W 73–56	11–5	14th Regiment Armory; Brooklyn, NY
January 29, 1949*	vs. Brooklyn Polytech	W 61–48	12–5	Brooklyn Central YMCA; Brooklyn, NY
February 1, 1949*	at Queens	W 66–51	13–5	Forest Hills High School Gymnasium; Forest Hills, NY
February 4, 1949*; WPIX	vs. Seton Hall	W 69–58	14–5	14th Regiment Armory; Brooklyn, NY
February 9, 1949	at Fordham	W 56–39	15–5 (2–1)	Rose Hill Gymnasium (3,200); Bronx, NY
February 11, 1949*	Loyola (Baltimore)	L 64–66	15–6	14th Regiment Armory; Brooklyn, NY
February 12, 1949*	vs. Rutgers (Newark)	W 55–53	16–6	Newark Armory; Newark, NJ
February 16, 1949*	Iona	W 66–62 ^{OT}	17–6	14th Regiment Armory; Brooklyn, NY
February 18, 1949*	Cincinnati	L 62–91	17–7	14th Regiment Armory; Brooklyn, NY
February 22, 1949*	at St. Bonaventure	L 33–54	17–8	Olean, NY
February 24, 1949*	at Canisius	L 46–51	17–9	Memorial Auditorium (6,715); Buffalo, NY
February 26, 1949*	at Niagara	L 56–66	17–10	Gallagher Center; Lewiston, NY
March 2, 1949*	Creighton	W 50–43	18–10	14th Regiment Armory; Brooklyn, NY
March 4, 1949	St. John's	L 43–57	18–11 (2–2)	14th Regiment Armory (3,000); Brooklyn, NY
Benefit Games
March 6, 1949	Lincoln Caseys; National Foundation for Infantile Paralysis	W 71–63		Sunnyside Garden (2,000)
March 12, 1949	Siena	W 54–50		(5,500); Albany, NY
National Catholic Invitation Tournament
March 23, 1949*	vs. St. Norbert's; First Round	W 61–53	19–11	Denver, CO
March 24, 1949*	vs. St. Thomas; Second Round	W 59–42	20–11	Denver, CO
March 25, 1949*	vs. St. Benedict's; Semifinals	W 69–40	21–11	Denver, CO
March 26, 1949*; 11:00 pm	at Regis; Finals	L 47–51	21–12	Denver, CO
*Non-conference game. ^{#}Rankings from AP Poll. (#) Tournament seedings in parentheses. All times are in Eastern Time.

== National Catholic Invitation Tournament ==
In 1949, the Terriers were invited to participate in the first annual National Catholic Invitation Tournament, to take place in Denver, Colorado. Gallagher was awarded a trophy as the Tournaments outstanding player.

First Round; March 23
St. Francis (NY)	61
St. Norbert's	53
3	St. Thomas	69
St. Edward's	32
St. Benedict's	60
Siena	46
Dayton	53
Loras	52
2	Regis	63
Iona	51
Saint Francis (PA)	57
Mount St. Mary's	51
Loyola (MD)	75
St. Ambrose	58
4	Gonzaga	49
St. Bonaventure	40

Quarterfinals; March 24
St. Francis (NY)	59
3	St. Thomas	42
St. Benedict's	59
Dayton	55
2	Regis	66
Saint Francis (PA)	49
Loyola (MD)	53
4	Gonzaga	51

Semifinals; March 25
St. Francis (NY)	69
St. Benedict's	40
2	Regis	67
Loyola (MD)	60

Finals; March 26
St. Francis (NY)	47
2	Regis	51
Third place
Loyola (MD)	71
St. Benedict's	70

== NBA draft ==
At the end of the season Tom Gallagher was selected with the 45th overall pick by the Baltimore Bullets.
