= 1949–50 St. Francis Terriers men's basketball team =

American college basketball season

1949–50 St. Francis Terriers men's basketball

National Catholic Invitation Tournament Finals vs. Siena, L 50–57
- Conference: Metropolitan New York Conference
- Record: 8–19 (0–4 MTNY)
- Head coach: Daniel Lynch (2nd season)
- Assistant coach: Marty O'Donnell
- Home arena: Butler Street Gymnasium; II Corps Artillery Armory

1949–50 Metropolitan New York Conference men's basketball standings
	Conf.				Overall
Team	W		L	PCT	W		L	PCT
CCNY	6	–	0	1.000	24	–	5	.828
Fordham	3	–	2	.600	15	–	12	.556
Brooklyn	2	–	2	.500	24	–	5	.828
No. 9 St. John's	3	–	3	.500	24	–	5	.828
Manhattan	3	–	3	.500	14	–	11	.560
NYU	1	–	4	.200	8	–	11	.421
St. Francis (NY)	0	–	4	.000	8	–	18	.308
Rankings from AP Poll

The 1949–50 St. Francis Terriers men's basketball team represented St. Francis College during the 1949–50 NCAA men's basketball season. The team was coached by Daniel Lynch, who was in his second year as head coach of the St. Francis Terriers. The team was a member of the Metropolitan New York Conference and played their home games at the Bulter Street Gymnasium in their Cobble Hill, Brooklyn campus and at the II Corps Artillery Armory in Park Slope, Brooklyn.

Last season the Terriers were the first team in the New York City area to have a basketball game televised, and this season the Terriers had six games televised on WPIX and WOR-TV from the II Corps Artillery Armory.

== Roster ==
1949–50 St. Francis Brooklyn Terriers men's basketball team
Players
Coaches

Pos.	#	Name	Height	Weight	Year	Previous school	Hometown
G	12	Tom O'Connor (C)	5 ft 10 in (1.78 m)	—
F	23	Jack O'Connor	6 ft 2 in (1.88 m)	—
F	15	Roy Reardon	6 ft 1 in (1.85 m)	—	Jr
G	5	Steve Ellsworth	5 ft 10 in (1.78 m)	—	Jr	St. Michael's High School
G	32	James Luisi (C)	6 ft 2 in (1.88 m)	—	Jr	Benjamin Franklin High School	East Harlem, New York
G		Ray Rudzinski	6 ft 0 in (1.83 m)	—	So
	13	Martin Conway	6 ft 3 in (1.91 m)	—	So
		Bill Paterno	6 ft 2 in (1.88 m)	—
G	14	Levi Bough	5 ft 11 in (1.8 m)	—
C	22	Dick Joyce	6 ft 3 in (1.91 m)	—
G	21	Tom Quinn	5 ft 11 in (1.8 m)	—
C	42	Vin Karwoski	6 ft 5 in (1.96 m)	—
	4	Frank Sainato	5 ft 8 in (1.73 m)	—	Fr
	11	Larry Sarcedote	6 ft 2 in (1.88 m)	—	Fr

Head coach

- Daniel Lynch (St. Francis '38)

Assistant coach(es)

Marty O'Donnel

Legend

- (C) Team captain
- (S) Suspended
- (I) Ineligible
- (W) Walk-on
- Injured
- Current redshirt

== Schedule and results ==
Date time, TV	Opponent	Result	Record	Site (attendance) city, state
Exhibition
December 1, 1949*	vs. Alumni	W 64–57	1–0	Butler Campus Gymnasium; Brooklyn, NY
Regular Season
December 2, 1948*; 9:00 pm, WOR-TV	Loyola (Baltimore)	W 67–60	1–0	II Corps Artillery Armory; Brooklyn, NY
December 7, 1949*	at Villanova	L 57–80	1–1	Palestra (3,000); Philadelphia, PA
December 9, 1949	Manhattan	L 57–71	1–2 (0–1)	II Corps Artillery Armory (2,000); Brooklyn, NY
December 14, 1949*	at Adelphi	W 90–62	2–2	Garden City, NY
December 16, 1949*	at LeMoyne	W 78–68	3–2	Coliseum; Syracuse, NY
December 17, 1949*	at Siena	L 45–62	3–3	(5,500); Albany, NY
December 19, 1949*	at Niagara	L 58–65	3–4	Niagara Falls, NY
January 6, 1950; 9:35 pm, WPIX	Fordham	L 51–56	3–5 (0–2)	II Corps Artillery Armory (1,198); Brooklyn, NY
January 11, 1950*	at Seton Hall	L 64–66	3–6	Setonia Gymnasium (1,600); South Orange, NJ
January 13, 1950*; 9:00 pm, WPIX	National Autonomous University of Mexico	W 94–59	4–6	II Corps Artillery Armory; Brooklyn, NY
January 26, 1950	at No. 5 St. John's	L 46–65	4–7 (0–3)	DeGray Gymnasium (800); Brooklyn, NY
January 28, 1950*; 9:00 pm, WOR-TV	Boston College	L 77–81	4–8	II Corps Artillery Armory; Brooklyn, NY
February 1, 1950*	at Kent State	L 70–78	4–9	(6,000); Cleveland, OH
February 2, 1950*	at Akron	L 50–58	4–10	Akron, OH
February 4, 1950*	at New Britain State Teachers College	W 59–54	5–10	New Britain, CT
February 8, 1950	No. 14 CCNY	L 46–68	5–11 (0–4)	II Corps Artillery Armory; Brooklyn, NY
February 11, 1950*	at Scranton	L 52–56	5–12	Scranton, PA
February 13, 1950	at Nevada	L 62–70	5–13	(2,000); Reno, NV
February 15, 1950*	at Pepperdine	L 50–81	5–14	Los Angeles, CA
February 18, 1950*	vs. Santa Clara	L 64–76	5–15	Cow Palace; San Francisco, CA
February 19, 1950*	at No. 12 San Francisco	L 42–73	5–16	Kezar Pavilion; San Francisco, CA
February 24, 1950*	Hawaii	W 76–54	6–16	II Corps Artillery Armory (1,500); Brooklyn, NY
March 1, 1950*	at Iona	L 55–74	6–17	Westchester County Center; White Plains, NY
March 3, 1950*; 9:30 pm, WPIX	No. 17 Toledo	L 73–85	6–18	II Corps Artillery Armory; Brooklyn, NY
National Catholic Invitation Tournament
March 29, 1950*	vs. Creighton; First Round	W 67–66	7–18	Washington Avenue Armory; Albany, NY
March 30, 1950*	vs. Iona; Semifinals	W 62–61	8–18	Washington Avenue Armory; Albany, NY
April 1, 1950*	at Siena; Finals	L 50–57	8–19	Washington Avenue Armory; Albany, NY
*Non-conference game. ^{#}Rankings from AP Poll. (#) Tournament seedings in parentheses. All times are in Eastern Time.

== National Catholic Invitation Tournament ==
Originally the tournament was to take place at Loyola College in Baltimore, MD from March 15 to March 22 and feature sixteen teams. Yet, because of segregation and protest from St. Francis College about the unequal treatment of its black players, the tournament was moved to Albany, NY and featured eight teams. Creighton was favored to win the tournament, although they had a 13–13 record going into the tournament the Bluejays had the toughest schedule of the eight competing teams.

Quarter-finals
St. Francis (NY)	67
Creighton	66
Iona	71
Saint Michael's	55
Loras	59
Saint Francis (PA)	58
Siena	86
Providence	49

Semi-finals
St. Francis (NY)	62
Iona	61
Siena	75
Loras	55

Final
St. Francis (NY)	50
Siena	57
Third place
Loras	55
Iona	52
