= 1952–53 St. Francis Terriers men's basketball team =

American college basketball season

1952–53 St. Francis Terriers men's basketball
- Conference: Metropolitan New York Conference
- Record: 19–7 (2–3 MTNY)
- Head coach: Daniel Lynch (5th season)
- Assistant coach: Marty O'Donnell
- Home arena: Butler Street Gymnasium; II Corps Artillery Armory

1952–53 Metropolitan New York Conference men's basketball standings
	Conf.				Overall
Team	W		L	PCT	W		L	PCT
Manhattan	6	–	0	1.000	20	–	6	.769
No. 7 St. John's	5	–	1	.833	17	–	6	.739
Fordham	4	–	2	.667	18	–	8	.692
St. Francis (NY)	2	–	3	.400	19	–	7	.731
NYU	1	–	3	.250	9	–	11	.450
CCNY	1	–	5	.167	10	–	6	.625
Brooklyn	0	–	5	.000	6	–	11	.353
Rankings from AP Poll

The 1952–1953 St. Francis Terriers men's basketball team represented St. Francis College during the 1952–53 NCAA Division I men's basketball season. The team was coached by Daniel Lynch, who was in his fifth year at the helm of the St. Francis Terriers. The team was a member of the Metropolitan New York Conference and played their home games at the Bulter Street Gymnasium in their Cobble Hill, Brooklyn campus and at the II Corps Artillery Armory in Park Slope, Brooklyn.

The Terriers, while not nationally ranked during the season, received votes from Associated Press balloting.

== Roster ==
1952–53 St. Francis Brooklyn Terriers men's basketball team
Players
Coaches

Pos.	#	Name	Height	Weight	Year	Hometown
F		Vern Stokes (C)	6 ft 2 in (1.88 m)	—	Sr
		Frank Sainato	5 ft 8 in (1.73 m)	—	Sr
C		Hank Daubenschmidt	6 ft 9 in (2.06 m)	—	Jr	Bronx, NY
F		Jack Walsh	6 ft 4 in (1.93 m)	—	Jr
G		George Searing	5 ft 11 in (1.8 m)	—	Jr
		Gerald McMurrer	6 ft 4 in (1.93 m)	—	Jr
G		Frank Dentico	5 ft 10 in (1.78 m)	—	So
G		Leo Keegan	5 ft 10 in (1.78 m)	—	So
		Elliott Press	6 ft 2 in (1.88 m)	—	So
C		Jack Prenderville	6 ft 4 in (1.93 m)	—
G		Marty Donohue	6 ft 3 in (1.91 m)	—
		Bob Pascal	6 ft 2 in (1.88 m)	—	So
		John Hearn	5 ft 10 in (1.78 m)	—	So

Head coach

- Daniel Lynch (St. Francis '38)

Assistant coach(es)

Legend

- (C) Team captain
- (S) Suspended
- (I) Ineligible
- (W) Walk-on
- Injured
- Current redshirt

== Schedule ==
Date time, TV	Opponent	Result	Record	Site city, state
Exhibition
November 22, 1952*	Alumni	W 71–56	1–0	Butler Campus Gymnasium; Brooklyn, NY
Regular Season
November 26, 1952*	Fort Monmouth	W 78–48	1–0	Butler Campus Gymnasium; Brooklyn, NY
November 26, 1952*	Equitable Life	W 69–52	2–0	Butler Campus Gymnasium; Brooklyn, NY
December 3, 1952*	Seton Hall	L 61–77	2–1	II Corps Artillery Armory (2,000); Brooklyn, NY
December 5, 1952*	Pace	W 68–53	3–1	II Corps Artillery Armory; Brooklyn, NY
December 10, 1952	at Fordham	L 51–69	3–2 (0–1)	Rose Hill Gymnasium (1,000); Bronx, NY
December 13, 1952*	at Iona	L 75–79 ^{OT}	3–3	Westchester County Center (3,000); White Plains, NY
December 17, 1952*	Memphis State College	W 76–71	4–3	II Corps Artillery Armory; Brooklyn, NY
December 20, 1952*	at Adelphi	W 85–64	5–3	Garden City, NY
December 30, 1952*	at Siena	W 57–55	6–3	Albany, NY
January 2, 1952*	Amherst	W 68–36	7–3	II Corps Artillery Armory; Brooklyn, NY
January 7, 1952	St. John's	L 54–68	7–4 (0–2)	II Corps Artillery Armory; Brooklyn, NY
January 10, 1952*	at LeMoyne	W 67–56	8–4	(2,000); Syracuse, NY
January 13, 1952*	at Canisius	W 72–65	9–4	Memorial Auditorium; Buffalo, NY
January 28, 1952*	Fairfield	W 74–63	10–4	II Corps Artillery Armory; Brooklyn, NY
January 31, 1952*	at Loyola (Baltimore)	W 79–66	11–4	Baltimore, MD
February 5, 1953*	Siena	W 69–66 ^{OT}	12–4	II Corps Artillery Armory (2,500); Brooklyn, NY
February 6, 1953*	at New Britain State Teachers College	W 72–62	13–4	New Britain, CT
February 11, 1953*	Saint Francis (PA)	W 81–73	14–4	II Corps Artillery Armory; Brooklyn, NY
February 14, 1953	Queens	W 67–53	15–4	II Corps Artillery Armory; Brooklyn, NY
February 18, 1953	Manhattan	L 60–62	15–5 (0–3)	II Corps Artillery Armory; Brooklyn, NY
February 21, 1953*	Boston College	W 71–62	16–5	II Corps Artillery Armory (1,500); Brooklyn, NY
February 25, 1953	at CCNY	W 69–66	17–5 (1–3)	New York, NY
February 26, 1953*	at Villanova	L 79–81	17–6	Palestra; Philadelphia, PA
February 28, 1953*	at Saint Peter's	L 78–91	17–7	Jersey City Armory; Jersey City, NJ
March 2, 1953*	Baldwin Wallace	W 77–65	18–7	II Corps Artillery Armory; Brooklyn, NY
March 7, 1953	Brooklyn College	W 66–49	19–7 (2–3)	II Corps Artillery Armory; Brooklyn, NY
*Non-conference game. ^{#}Rankings from AP Poll. (#) Tournament seedings in parentheses. All times are in Eastern Time.

== Awards ==
- Vernon Stokes

All-Metropolitan Selection by the Metropolitan Basketball Writers Association
