= 1963 National Invitation Tournament =

Annual NCAA basketball competition

- Season: 1962–63
- Teams: 12
- Finals site: Madison Square Garden, New York City
- Champions: Providence Friars (2nd title)
- Runner-up: Canisius Golden Griffins (1st title game)
- Semifinalists: Marquette Warriors (1st semifinal); Villanova Wildcats (1st semifinal)
- Winning coach: Joe Mullaney (2nd title)
- MVP: Raymond Flynn (Providence)

The 1963 National Invitation Tournament was the 1963 edition of the annual NCAA college basketball competition.

== Selected teams ==
Below is a list of the 12 teams selected for the tournament.

- Canisius
- DePaul
- Fordham
- La Salle
- Marquette
- Memphis
- Miami (FL)
- Providence
- Saint Louis
- St. Francis (NY)
- Villanova
- Wichita State

== Bracket ==
Below is the tournament bracket.

First round
Villanova	63
DePaul	51
Memphis	70
Fordham	49
Miami (FL)	71
St. Francis (NY)	70
Saint Louis	63
La Salle	61

Quarterfinals
Villanova	54
Wichita State	53
Canisius	76
Memphis	67
Miami (FL)	96
Providence	106
Marquette	84
Saint Louis	49

Semifinals
Villanova	46
Canisius	61
Providence	70
Marquette	64

Finals
Canisius	66
Providence	81

Third place game
Villanova	58
Marquette	66

== See also ==
- 1963 NCAA University Division basketball tournament
- 1963 NCAA College Division basketball tournament
- 1963 NAIA Division I men's basketball tournament
