= Metropolitan Collegiate Conference =

College sports conference, 1965–1969

The Metropolitan Collegiate Conference (MCC) was a college athletic conference that existed from 1965 until 1969. The participating schools were exclusively from New York and New Jersey. The 10 founding members of the conference in 1965 were: Manhattan, Long Island University, New York University, Hofstra, Fairleigh Dickinson, Saint Peter's, Seton Hall, Iona, Wagner and St. Francis.

For the 1967–68 season NYU left the conference to become an independent, and for the 1968–69 season St. Francis followed. By 1969 the conference was defunct.

== Men's basketball champions ==
Season	Regular season champion	Postseason tournaments
1965–66	Manhattan (8–1)	Manhattan, NIT first round NYU, NIT 2nd Place; LIU, NCAA College Division Quarterfinals
1966–67	St. Francis (NY) (7–2); Saint Peter's (7–2); Manhattan (7–2)	Saint Peter's, NIT first round LIU, NCAA College Division Quarterfinals; Wagner, NCAA College Division Regional semifinals
1967–68	St. Peter's (8–0)	Saint Peter's, NIT 3rd Place Game
1968–69	St. Peter's (7–1); Manhattan (7–1)	Saint Peter's, NIT Quarterfinals
