= 69th Regiment Armory =

Armory in Manhattan, New York

- U.S. National Register of Historic Places
- U.S. National Historic Landmark
- New York State Register of Historic Places
- New York City Landmark
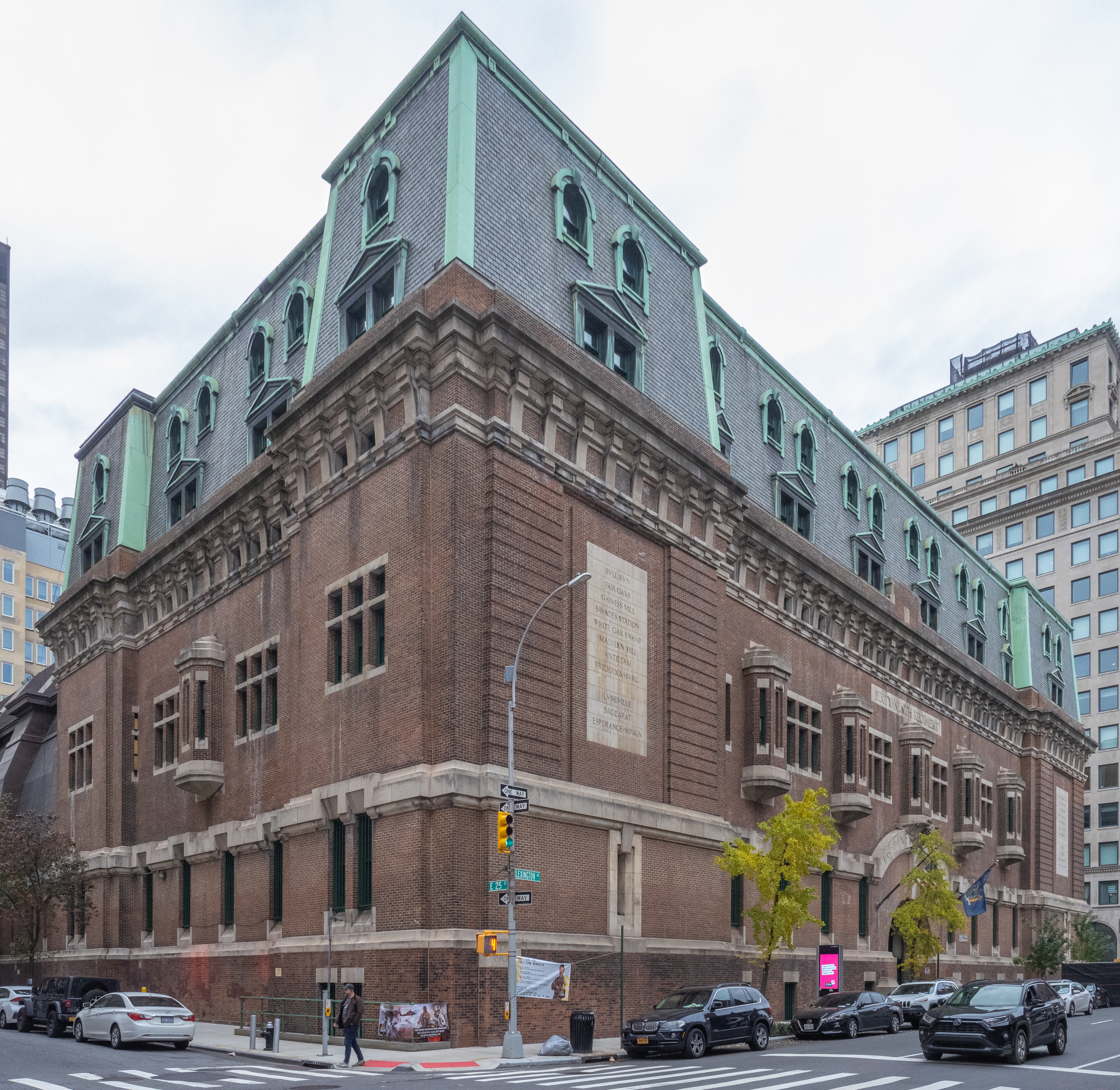
- Location: 68 Lexington Avenue, Manhattan, New York
- Coordinates: 40°44′29″N 73°59′03″W
- Built: 1906
- Architect: Hunt & Hunt
- MPS: Army National Guard Armories in New York State MPS
- NRHP reference No.: 93001538
- NYSRHP No.: 06101.007088
- NYCL No.: 1228

Significant dates
- Added to NRHP: January 28, 1994
- Designated NHL: June 19, 1996
- Designated NYSRHP: December 8, 1993
- Designated NYCL: April 12, 1983

The 69th Regiment Armory (also known as the 165th Infantry Armory and the Lexington Avenue Armory) is a historic armory for the U.S. Army National Guard at 68 Lexington Avenue, between East 25th and 26th Streets, in the Rose Hill neighborhood of Manhattan in New York City, United States. Completed in 1906, the armory was designed by the firm of Hunt & Hunt in the Beaux-Arts style. The building is a New York City designated landmark and is listed on the National Register of Historic Places as a National Historic Landmark.

The 69th Regiment Armory was the first armory built in New York City not modeled on a medieval fortress. The building is divided into two parts. The drill shed to the west, in the middle of the block, has a brick facade with limestone trim, as well as a barrel vault. The administration building to the east is three stories high, with a brick-and-limestone facade, a large arch facing Lexington Avenue, and a double-height mansard roof; there are various offices and other rooms inside.

As early as 1886, the 69th Regiment had sought permission to erect a new armory. The site between 25th and 26th Street was not decided upon until 1899; the building began construction in 1904 and formally opened on October 13, 1906. The Armory was the site of the 1913 Armory Show, in which modern art was first publicly presented in the United States. The drill hall has been used for sporting and entertainment events, such as basketball games. As of 2023, it is still used as the headquarters of the New York Army National Guard's 1st Battalion, 69th Infantry Regiment, as well as for special events.

== Site ==
The armory is at 68 Lexington Avenue between 25th and 26th Streets in the Rose Hill neighborhood of Manhattan in New York City. The surrounding area is considered to be within either the NoMad or Rose Hill neighborhood. The lot measures 63,235 square feet (5,875 m^{2}) and occupies almost the entire city block between Park Avenue South to the west, 26th Street to the north, Lexington Avenue to the east, and 25th Street to the south. The site measures approximately 295 ft (90 m) along 26th Street, 200 ft (61 m) along Lexington Avenue, and 335 ft (102 m) along 25th Street. The armory abuts the site of the writer Herman Melville's former house at 104 East 26th Street.

== Architecture ==
Designed by the firm of Hunt & Hunt, the 69th Regiment Armory was the first armory built in New York City to not be modeled on a medieval fortress; instead, it was designed in the Beaux-Arts style. The James D. Murphy Company was the general contractor and masonry contractor for the project. Other contractors involved in the armory's construction included ironwork contractor Milliken Brothers, granite contractor J. E. Dutton, cut-stone contractor Rawnsley and Jackson, bluestone contractor Thomas J. Dunn, fireproofer Roebling Construction Company, carpenter Charles Morton, and electrician James Reilly's Sons Co.

=== Form and facade ===
As designed, the building is divided into two parts: the drill shed to the west, in the middle of the block, and the administration building to the east, facing Lexington Avenue. Both structures were designed with brick facades accented by limestone trim. On 25th Street, there is a wing at the southwest corner with a frontage of 30 ft (9.1 m) and a depth of 90 ft (27 m); it is four stories high and was used as an infirmary.

==== Administration building ====
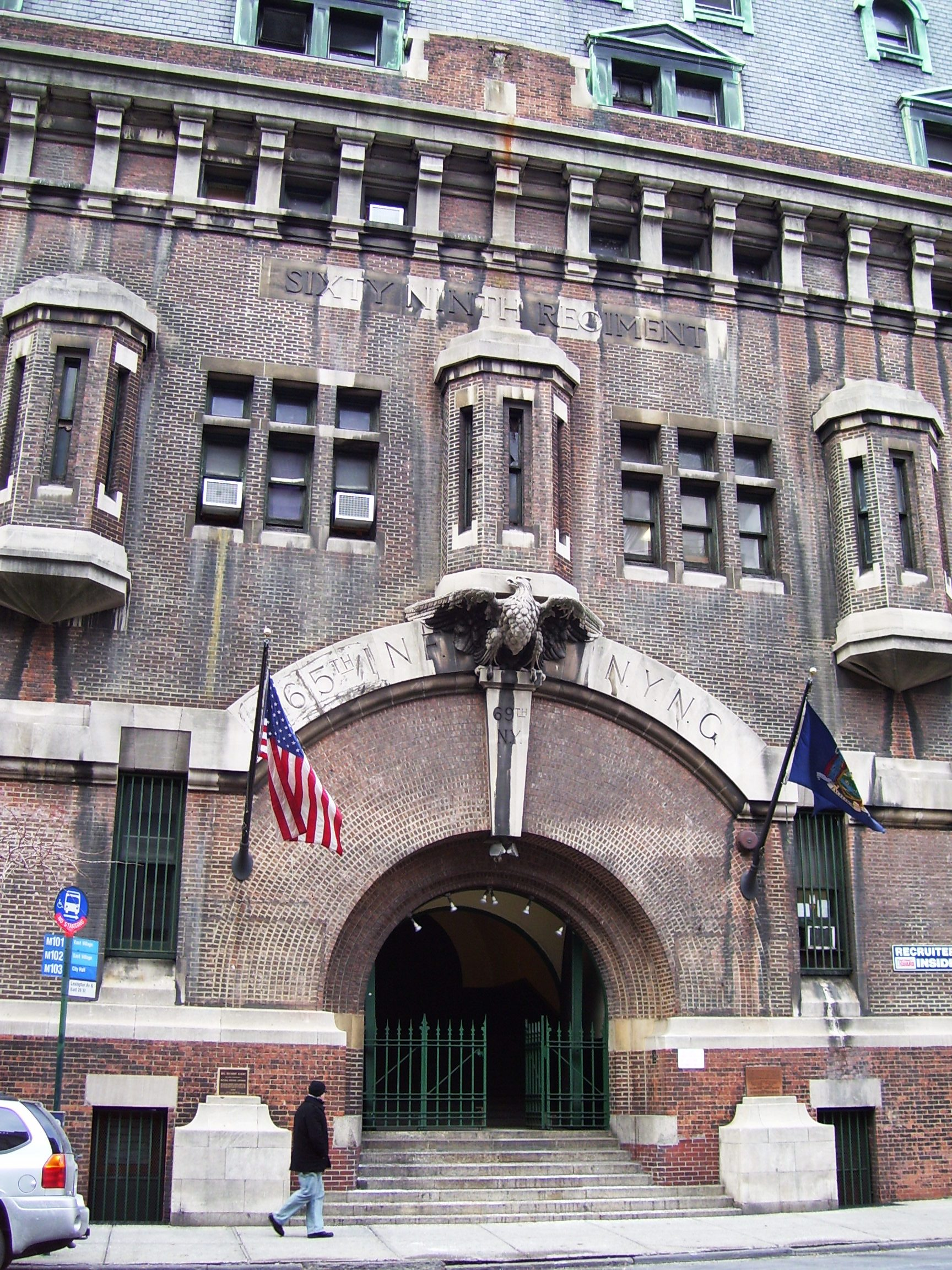
The entrance to the administration building

The administration building is three stories high and is topped by a double-height mansard roof. The main elevation of the building's facade is on Lexington Avenue and is symmetrical, being arranged vertically into five bays. On the north and south ends of the Lexington Avenue elevation, pavilions protrude slightly onto the street. At the base of the building, a limestone water table wraps across all three elevations of the facade. A limestone band course also wraps horizontally across the facade, underneath the first-story window sills. The center of the Lexington Avenue elevation contains a massive limestone round arch, surrounded by brick headers and topped by an eagle-shaped keystone. A sally port is recessed deeply within this archway and is shielded by an iron portcullis. On the rest of the ground story, there are long, narrow rectangular windows shielded by iron grilles.

On the second story of the Lexington Avenue elevation, there are quoins on the outer edge of each pavilion. Between each set of quoins are limestone plaques bearing the names of battles where the 69th Regiment fought. On the remainder of the second story, each bay contains tripartite windows with transom bars at their tops. All of the bays on the Lexington Avenue facade, and the center two bays on 25th and 26th Streets, are separated by polygonal limestone-trimmed oriel windows, which served as gun bays. Above the second floor, a cornice with large brackets runs horizontally across the facade, and there is a brick parapet directly above the cornice. The mansard roof is made of slate and covered with copper. The mansard roof was originally one story high, making the administration building 82 feet (25 m) tall. The roof was expanded in the 1920s to two stories; the modern-day roof has pairs of round-arched or rectangular dormers with copper frames.

==== Drill shed ====
The drill shed is oriented east–west along 25th and 26th Streets and is variously cited as measuring 200.96 by 168.83 feet (61 by 51 m); 200 by 170 feet (61 by 52 m); or 202 by 189 feet (62 by 58 m). It has a brick facade with limestone trim, similar to in the administration building. On all sides, the first story consists of a brick and stone wall with buttresses. The roof is a barrel vault that early sources cited as measuring 126 feet (38 m) high. Local firm Milliken Brothers manufactured the steelwork for the roof, which is supported by six arches, each consisting of two three-hinged steel trusses. The trusses are grouped into pairs and are riveted together, spanning a distance of 189 feet 8 inches (57.81 m). The roof also has a sealed-off skylight which measured 80 by 20 feet (24.4 by 6.1 m). By the late 20th century, an aluminized fabric covering had been placed over the roof.

=== Features ===
Both the drill hall and the administration building were constructed with a superstructure of steel beams. There are no columns within the armory itself; instead, the weight of the upper stories is carried by the load-bearing exterior walls, which are very thick and have few windows.

The entrance of the drill hall led into a lobby with stairways and elevators on either side. On the first story of the administration building, were the regimental library, colonel's room, and officers' rooms. The lieutenant colonel's study contains an antique table, while the colonel's room has 69th Regiment memorabilia including Medals of Honor and portraits commissioned from the American Civil War. The primary feature of the first story was the drill hall at the rear, measuring 137.5 by 201 feet (41.9 by 61.3 m) across. The drill hall is surrounded on all sides by a balcony, which is 16 feet (4.9 m) wide. The eastern wall also contains an arch measuring 90 feet (27 m) across and 68 feet (21 m) tall, which was the largest in the United States when the building was completed in the 1900s. The outer edges of the arch measure 190 feet (58 m) wide and 116 feet (35 m) tall, leading The New York Times to say that it was "asserted to be the largest brick arch in the world".

The second story was used for regimental company rooms. The third story has a gymnasium measuring 113.5 by 42.8 feet (34.6 by 13.0 m) across. The fourth floor had showers and restrooms, as well as rooms for the quartermasters, drum corps, and band. In the basement were a shooting range, a two-lane bowling alley, a magazine, and mess rooms. There is also a meeting room with murals in the basement. Military memorabilia, such as grenades, helmets, drums, and bayonets, are displayed throughout the armory.

== History ==
After the American Civil War ended, the New York state government passed a law, which mandated that armories be erected for volunteer regiments by each of the individual counties. This resulted in the Armory Board of the City of New York being created in April 1884. The board erected many of Manhattan's armories: prior to the board's establishment, only one armory had been built in Manhattan, the Seventh Regiment Armory on the Upper East Side. As such, most volunteer regiments drilled in any available space, such as public markets or rented building lofts. This included the 69th Infantry Regiment of New York, a largely Irish-American regiment which until 1880 was located at what is now Essex Market. That year, the 69th moved to the Tompkins Market Armory, which had been vacated by the 7th New York Militia Regiment when the Seventh Regiment Armory opened.

=== Development ===
==== Site selection and initial plans ====
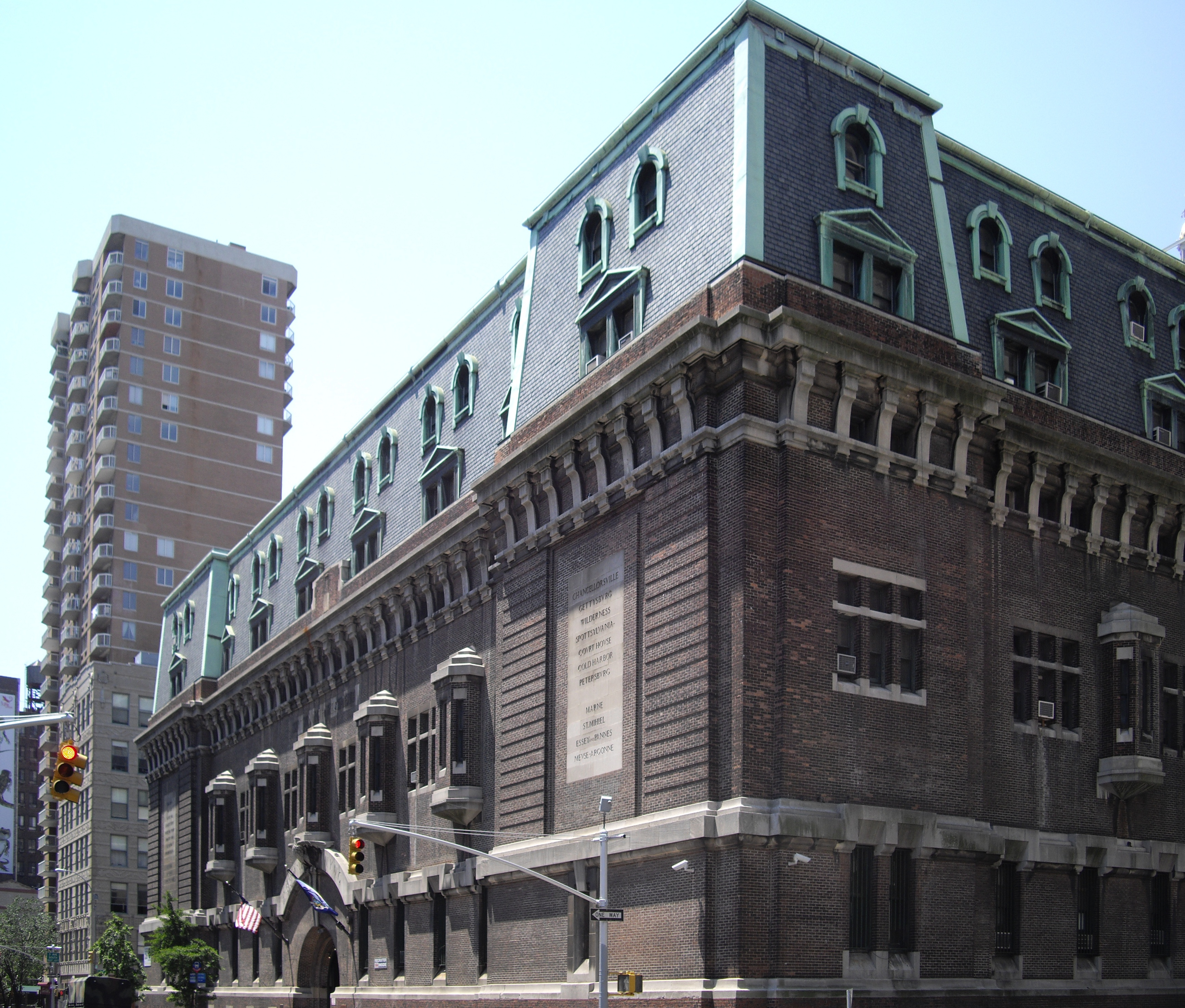
Seen from 26th Street

Under Colonel George Moore Smith, as early as 1886, the 69th Regiment had sought permission from the Armory Board to erect a new armory. At the time, armories in Manhattan were concentrated north of 59th Street, so the board wanted to build an armory that was south of 42nd Street. At first, the Armory Board wanted to erect a new armory at the site of the Tompkins Square Armory, but this plan was rejected. Another site at the intersection of Lexington Avenue and 23rd Street, occupied by a City College of New York building, (Note: Now Baruch College's Field Building) was identified by 1896 but was also rejected. Colonel Edward Duffy and other regimental officers said the City College site, at 200 by 225 ft (61 by 69 m), would be too small for a drill hall. Duffy instead recommended that the Armory Board acquire a nearby site bounded by Fourth Avenue, 26th Street, Lexington Avenue, and 25th Street.

The Armory Board accepted the site on 25th and 26th Streets in September 1899, excluding the land abutting Fourth Avenue, (Note: This segment of Fourth Avenue was later renamed Park Avenue South. On 25th Street, the armory would occupy the entire blockfront except the 100-foot-wide (30 m) strip of land just east of Fourth Avenue. On 26th Street, the armory would occupy the entire blockfront except the 125-foot-wide (38 m) strip of land just east of Fourth Avenue.) and recommended in January 1900 that the city acquire the site through condemnation. A set of commissioners were appointed that May to appraise the land. In October 1900, the city appointed Horgan & Slattery to design the 69th Regiment Armory; the relatively unknown firm had connections to the politically powerful Tammany Hall organization of the time. That December, Brigadier-General McCoskry Butt expressed his opposition to the design, but the Armory Board nonetheless approved the plans the next month. Horgan and Slattery filed plans for the armory in October 1901, which were to cost $450,000 and contain a drill hall, gymnasium, shooting range, pool, seven-story lookout tower, and other rooms for the regiment.

==== Change of plans and construction ====
After Seth Low won the 1901 New York City mayoral election, he declared his intention to break up Horgan & Slattery's monopoly on municipal buildings. The Armory Board reviewed bids from construction contractors in January 1902 but rejected all the bids for being too expensive; the lowest bid was $666,394. That March, Low moved to cancel the board's contract with Horgan & Slattery, and he appointed a committee to help the regiment find suitable temporary quarters. Per Low's request, the president of the New York Society of Architects selected George B. Post and Henry Janeway Hardenbergh to set up a design competition for the 69th Regiment Armory. Horgan & Slattery indicated that they would sue the city for the plans that they had drawn for the armory. By that July, there was $533,000 for the proposed armory; the same month, the New York City Board of Estimate increased the armory's appropriation to $550,000.

The Armory Board approved the plans of Hunt & Hunt in November 1902, at which point the armory was planned to cost $600,000. The Armory Board again increased the appropriation for the armory in early 1903 to $650,000. Meanwhile, Horgan & Slattery were suing the city for $22,500 in architects' fees; that June, a judge ruled that the city owed the firm $16,855. Hunt & Hunt filed revised plans for the armory in August 1903. The building was to be designed in the Beaux-Arts style; co-architect Richard Howland Hunt said he aimed to "make the building look like an armory in the city—not a mediaeval castle demanding for completeness a moat and country setting". The Fleischmann Realty and Construction Company received a $617,300 contract for the armory's construction that month, but the bidding process was subsequently reopened. The contract was re-awarded at the end of 1903 to the James D. Murphy Company for $606,266.

Workers began clearing the site in February 1904, displacing the residents of several boarding houses. The existing tenants had difficulty securing new apartments, and in one case a resident caught pneumonia and died while looking for a new home. Mayor George B. McClellan Jr. laid the armory's cornerstone at a groundbreaking ceremony on April 23, 1904, marking the 43rd anniversary of when the 69th Regiment left New York City to fight in the Civil War. Several other construction contracts were awarded the next month. The armory was almost complete by October 1905 and was ready to host events by the end of the year. That November, the city's Sinking Fund Commission approved $18,500 in bonds for lockers, gun racks, and railings at the armory. The armory hosted its first event, a vehicular show, in January 1906, but its official opening date was repeatedly rescheduled.

=== Opening and early years ===
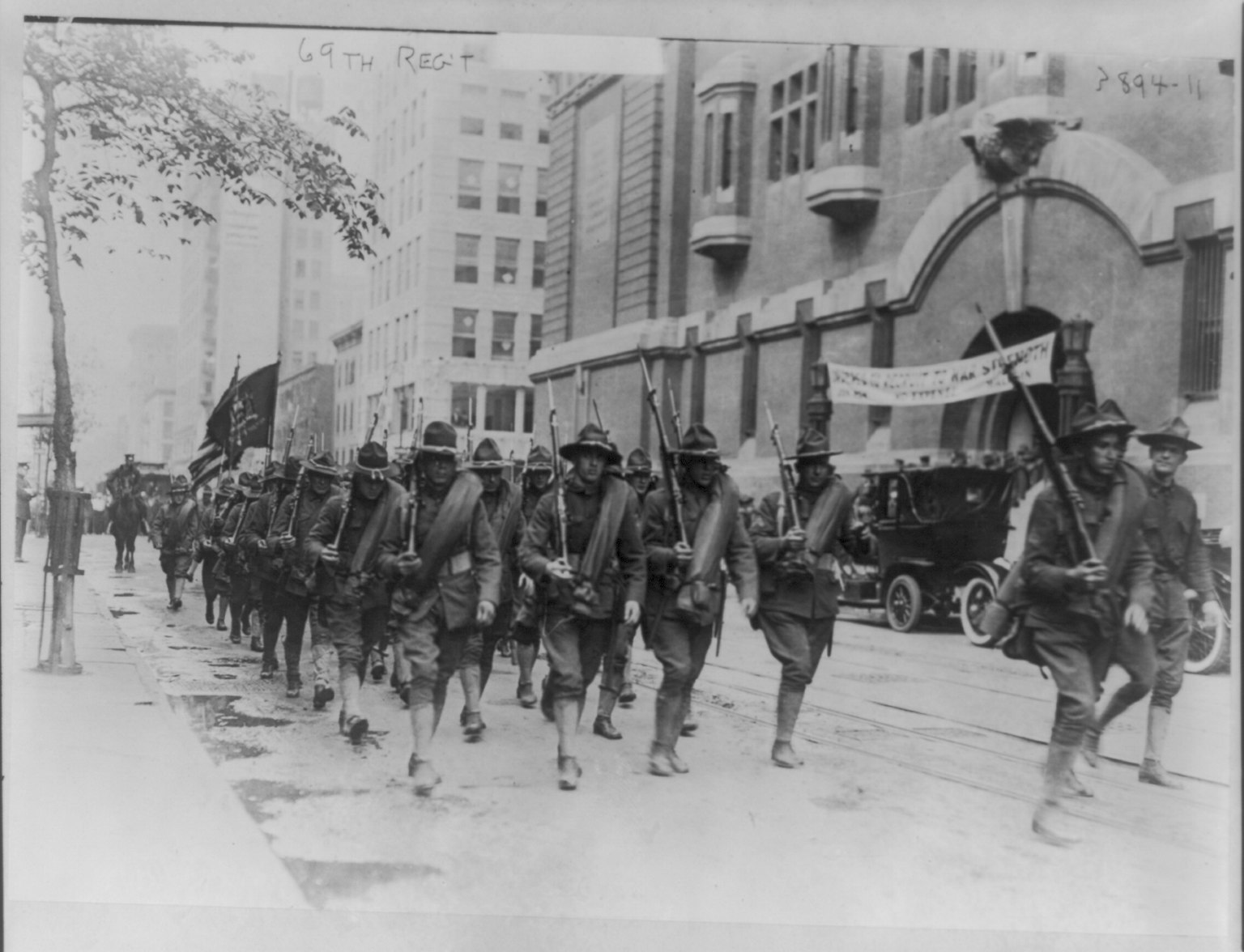
69th Regiment, New York National Guard, marching past armory entrance

The 69th Regiment moved into the armory on October 13, 1906, escorted by the 7th New York Militia Regiment and the 9th Massachusetts Volunteer Militia Regiment. That December, Duffy ordered that the 69th Regiment begin allowing tennis players to use the drill hall. In its early years, the armory was rented out for numerous events, with the regiment charging $500 per day for each event. By the early 1910s, the 69th Regiment Armory and the nearby 71st Regiment Armory were competing with each other to host large events, as both armories had more floor space than the second Madison Square Garden, which was also nearby. Its most prominent event may have been the Armory Show in 1913, which greatly influenced the spread of avant-garde art. By then, local civic groups wanted the 69th Regiment to open up the armory to the community during the summers due to a lack of nearby public parks. The armory also hosted the 69th Regiment's elections and annual reviews of the regiment.

The armory was variously known as the 165th Infantry Armory and the Lexington Avenue Armory over the years. The armory's drill hall hosted a wide variety of events, becoming what The New York Times called "Manhattan's multipurpose site". The 69th Regiment itself was mustered in during June 1916, becoming the 165th Infantry Regiment during World War I. As soon as the 69th Regiment left to fight in the war, the 169th Regiment was established, occupying the 69th Regiment Armory. During the war, the armory was also used as a temporary dormitory for sailors and soldiers. The 165th Infantry moved back into the armory in early 1919, whereupon it was mustered out and then reorganized twice in two years. George M. McCabe designed an expansion to the roof in 1926, providing additional storage space. A plaque, dedicated to members of the 165th Infantry who died in World War I, was unveiled at the armory in 1927.

=== Mid- and late 20th century ===
One of the armory's rooms was dedicated to Edward Duffy in 1930. Additional tablets were dedicated in the 1930s, commemorating 165th Infantry troops who had died in World War I. These included tablets dedicated to the fallen members of Company F in 1931 and Company I in 1936, as well as a plaque in the armory's Regimental Headquarters Room in 1939. The National Re-employment Service opened a hiring office at the armory in 1933. Early the following year, city officials began using the building as a community center for homeless men during the daytime. As part of a 1936 Works Progress Administration project, Earl Lonsbury painted some murals in a meeting hall in the basement. The armory's floor was rebuilt in 1939 to accommodate the track and field games that took place there every year.

Another plaque at the armory was dedicated in early 1940, commemorating members of the 165th Infantry's machine-gun company who had been killed in World War I. With the onset of World War II, the New York state government stopped renting out the armory for civilian events that year. The 71st Infantry also began using the 69th Regiment Armory as an overflow training space, and the 165th Infantry was mustered in as part of the First Infantry Brigade of the New York National Guard. The public was allowed to use the armory again in 1943. Through the mid-20th century, the building continued to be used for events such as basketball games, which were sometimes hosted before military drills. Despite being a frequent venue for basketball games, in 1967, the 69th Regiment Armory was described by one critic as "close to being a fire trap" and unpopular among regular visitors.

The Native New Yorkers Historical Association announced plans in late 1970 to install a plaque on the building, commemorating the Armory Show of 1913, but the plaque was not unveiled until the end of 1972. The armory was designated as a city landmark in April 1983. By that decade, the fourth floor of the building contained a women's homeless shelter, with 184 residents. During the 1980s, the armory also had some public tennis courts, which were used by Baruch College during the academic year. The First Battalion, part of the 42nd Infantry Division, continued to occupy the armory at the end of the 20th century. The armory's basement rifle range had been shuttered, and the regiment estimated that it would cost $250,000 to restore murals in the basement's meeting hall. In addition, other parts of the building were rented out for events.

=== 21st century ===
After the September 11 attacks in 2001, the armory was converted to a "bereavement center" for victims and families. The New York City government proposed converting part of the 69th Regiment Armory into a 120-bed homeless shelter for men in 2005; at the time, the women's shelter had been relocated elsewhere. However, the plan was dropped due to opposition from local residents. The structure continued to host special events such as the Victoria's Secret Fashion Show; that show's organizers provided power generators to the armory after the structure's communications, power, and water infrastructure was damaged during Hurricane Sandy in 2012.

== Notable events ==
Over the years, there have been several events and exhibits at the 69th Regiment Armory and other drill halls across New York City. The first event at the armory, the Automobile Club of America's vehicular show, opened on January 13, 1906, and attracted tens of thousands of people in a week.

=== Armory Show ===
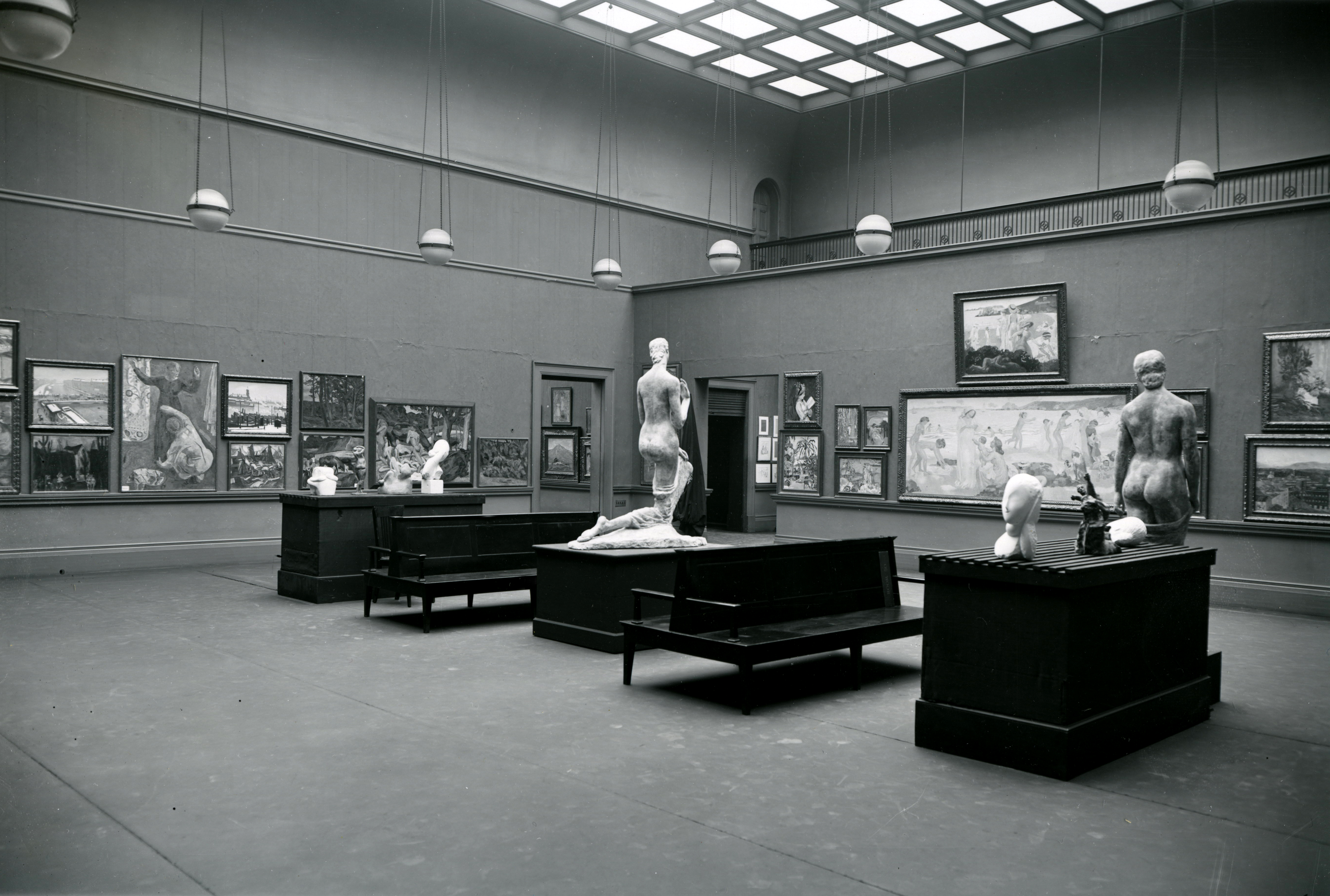
Scene from the Armory Show

The 69th Regiment Armory hosted the 1913 International Exhibition of Modern Art, also known as the Armory Show, following the efforts of Irish American collector John Quinn. The Armory Show, which was exhibited at the armory from February 17 to March 17, 1913. displayed some 1,300 paintings, sculptures, and decorative works. Although two-thirds of the featured artists were American, it also attracted Europeans like Vincent Van Gogh, Pablo Picasso, Henri Matisse, Raoul Dufy, Marcel Duchamp, and Andre Dunoyer de Segonzac. Over 100,000 people attended the show, which contributed to the rise of New York City as a major art center. According to NPR, the show "marked the dawn of Modernism in America" and marked the first use of the term avant-garde in relation to art.

Due to its novel nature, the show attracted large amounts of commentary when it opened, and it was still being discussed decades after it closed. For the show's 50th anniversary in 1963, over 300 pieces from the original show were exhibited in the drill hall, which was redesigned to replicate the appearance of the 1913 exhibition. The Architectural League of New York staged its annual "Beaux Arts Ball" at the Armory in 2013, to mark the centennial of the 1913 Armory Show.

=== Sports ===
The armory held its first-ever "open games" in April 1907, with members of several regiments participating in a variety of races. In its early years, the armory also hosted athletic meets and competitions such as those for the Evening Recreation Centres of Greater New York, the Catholic Athletic League, the St. Ann's Junior Holy Name Society, the Eccentric Association of Firemen, and the Metropolitan Life Insurance Company Athletic Association. Additionally, there were sports competitions such as lawn-tennis matches, amateur boxing matches, badminton games, and marathons. Thure Johansson of Sweden broke Dorando Pietri's indoor record for the marathon at the 69th Regiment Armory on March 1, 1910 (2 hours, 36 minutes, 55.2 seconds). (Note: There are a number of apparent inconsistencies in the available sources. The New York Times reported that Johansson later broke Peitri's mark of 2:44:20.4 which was set on November 28, 1908; however, the data provided by the Association of Road Racing Statistician indicates three faster times were recorded in the interim leading up to the Crowley/Holmer/Johansson race. Two days after their initial report, The New York Times published that there was "considerable discussion" that the race distance may have been short due to how the course was measured. Although the Association of Road Racing Statisticians does not indicate any irregularity with the distance or performance, the International Association of Athletics Federations does not report Johannson's March 1, 1910, performance as a previous world best.)

The Metropolitan Industrial Athletic League started meeting at the armory in 1927, and track-and-field meets were hosted annually at the armory through the 1930s. From late 1948 to early 1949, the armory hosted at least 17 roller derby matches, including the first matches ever broadcast on television. During the 1990s, the armory also hosted boxing matches and tennis games.

Many basketball games have been hosted at the armory. After World War II, the armory hosted collegiate basketball teams, such as City College, St. Francis College, and Baruch College. The 69th Regiment Armory was also the site of some New York Knicks home games from 1946 to 1960, including several NBA Finals games. The New York Americans, now the Brooklyn Nets, of the new American Basketball Association wanted to play at the armory in 1967, but pressure from the Knicks forced the new club to play in Teaneck, New Jersey, instead. The United States Olympic basketball team also played at the armory. The building also hosted what was then the world's longest basketball game in 1975, a 48-hour competition pitting players from two football teams (the Giants and the Jets) against "sundry teams". In 2009, the armory was used as a filming location for On the Shoulders of Giants, a basketball documentary by Kareem Abdul-Jabbar.

=== Expositions ===
In the 1910s, the 69th Regiment Armory hosted such events as the Sportsman Show, the Motor Boat Show, the Aeronautical Expedition, and the Motor Truck Show. The armory was also used as overflow space for the 1918 automobile show at Madison Square Garden. Shows during the 1920s included the National Business Show, the Own Your Home Exposition, a Catholic missionary exhibit, and the Radio World's Fair. The armory continued to host expositions through the mid-20th century, including the International Automobile Show, the Juvenile Products Show, the 1957 edition of the Winter Antiques Show, and the National Electric Industries Show. There have been other antiques shows at the 69th Regiment Armory through the end of the 20th century, including the Gramercy Park Antiques & Textiles Show.

=== Other events ===
During its first few decades, the armory hosted pageants, speeches, bazaars, and local civic meetings, as well as its first "municipal dance" in 1914. There were also some non-athletic competitions, such as typewriting contests. In the 1920s and 1930s, the armory also hosted events such as real-estate auctions, fundraisers, and police-academy graduation ceremonies. There were major gatherings as well, such as a memorial service honoring Casimir Pulaski and a Physical Fitness Day festival. Also during the 1920s, two newspapers owned by publisher William Randolph Hearst gave away free food to needy citizens every year during Christmas. The building also held some tennis games and speeches during World War II to raise money for the war effort.

During the 1960s, the armory hosted such varied events as an "African Carnival" fundraiser, electronic music performances, a political rally, and an engineering-themed art festival. This was followed by events like a learning fair for handicapped youth in the 1970s, as well as an art show in the 1980s that was intended as a tribute to the Armory Show. The armory's events in the 1990s included "Seventh on Sale" shopping marathons, the Night of Stars fashion show, the Gramercy International Art Fair, and an Asian art show. The armory was the site of the Museum of Comic and Cartoon Art's MoCCA Art Festival from 2009 to 2014. Additionally, the armory hosted the Downtown Art Fair starting in 2014, and it has sometimes been used for the Victoria's Secret Fashion Show.

== Critical reception ==
When the armory was completed, Montgomery Schuyler wrote: "The Sixty-Ninth is of an entirely different inspiration from any of its predecessors. It seems even to be a protest and token revolt against them." The New York Times described the armory in 2019 as "a Beaux-Arts bastion in an era when other armories were still being modeled on medieval fortresses."

== See also ==
- List of National Historic Landmarks in New York City
- List of New York City Designated Landmarks in Manhattan from 14th to 59th Streets
- National Register of Historic Places listings in Manhattan from 14th to 59th Streets
