= 14th Regiment Armory =

Armory in Brooklyn, New York

- U.S. National Register of Historic Places
- New York State Register of Historic Places
- New York City Landmark
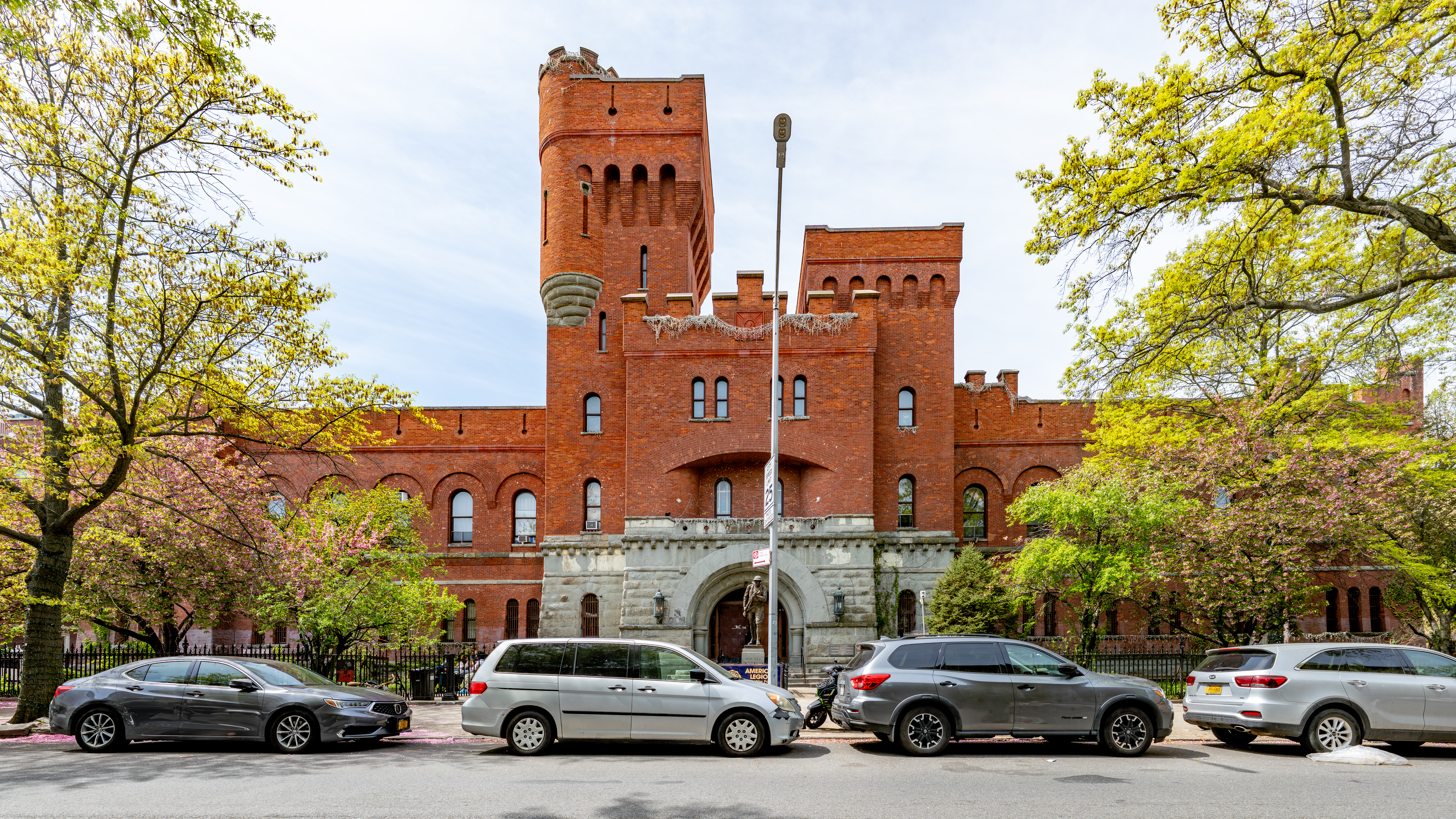
- (2026)

- Location within New York City Location within New York Location within the United States
- Location: 1402 Eighth Avenue, Brooklyn, New York, US
- Coordinates: 40°39′46″N 73°59′0″W
- Area: 3 acres (1.2 ha)
- Built: 1891–95
- Architect: William A. Mundell
- Architectural style: Late Victorian
- MPS: Army National Guard Armories in New York State MPS
- NRHP reference No.: 94000367
- NYSRHP No.: 04701.013582
- NYCL No.: 1965

Significant dates
- Added to NRHP: April 14, 1994
- Designated NYSRHP: March 14, 1994
- Designated NYCL: April 14, 1998

The 14th Regiment Armory, also known as the Eighth Avenue Armory and the Park Slope Armory, is a historic National Guard armory building located on Eighth Avenue between 14th and 15th Streets in the South Slope neighborhood of Brooklyn, New York City, United States. The building is a brick and stone castle-like structure, and designed to be reminiscent of medieval military structures in Europe. It was built in 1891–95 and was designed in the Late Victorian style by William A. Mundell.

The structure was originally built for the 14th Regiment of the New York State Militia. Since the 1980s, it has been in use as a women's homeless shelter. A veterans' museum and a YMCA sports facility are also located in the armory.

The armory was listed on the National Register of Historic Places in 1994, and was designated a New York City landmark in 1998.

== History ==
=== Planning ===
The 14th Regiment of the New York State Militia, organized in the 1840s, was the United States' most active state militia by the late 19th century. Nicknamed the "Fighting Fourteenth" and the "Red-Legged Devils", the 14th Regiment participated in numerous battles during the American Civil War. Concerns about the readiness of volunteer militia led to the passage of an "Armory Law" in 1862, during the Civil War, which called for the construction of armories statewide. However, the effort stagnated after the end of the war. The 14th Regiment moved to the Gothic-style Second Division/North Portland Avenue/State Arsenal in 1877–1878, whereupon the facility was renamed to "State Armory". The Second Division Armory, now demolished, was located at Auburn Place and North Portland Avenue in what is now Fort Greene.

In 1890–1891, the 14th Regiment Armory Commission made plans for a new armory building in the present-day neighborhood of Park Slope, along Eighth Avenue between 14th and 15th Streets, near Prospect Park. The lot measured 200 feet (61 m) on Eighth Avenue and 550 feet (170 m) on the side streets. At the time, the site contained a few industrial buildings. On November 25, 1890, the commission decided to buy the site. The purchase was concluded on March 11, 1891, with the Kings County government paying the Nassau Land and Improvement Company a little over $79,000. William A. Mundell was the building's architect.

=== Construction and use as armory ===
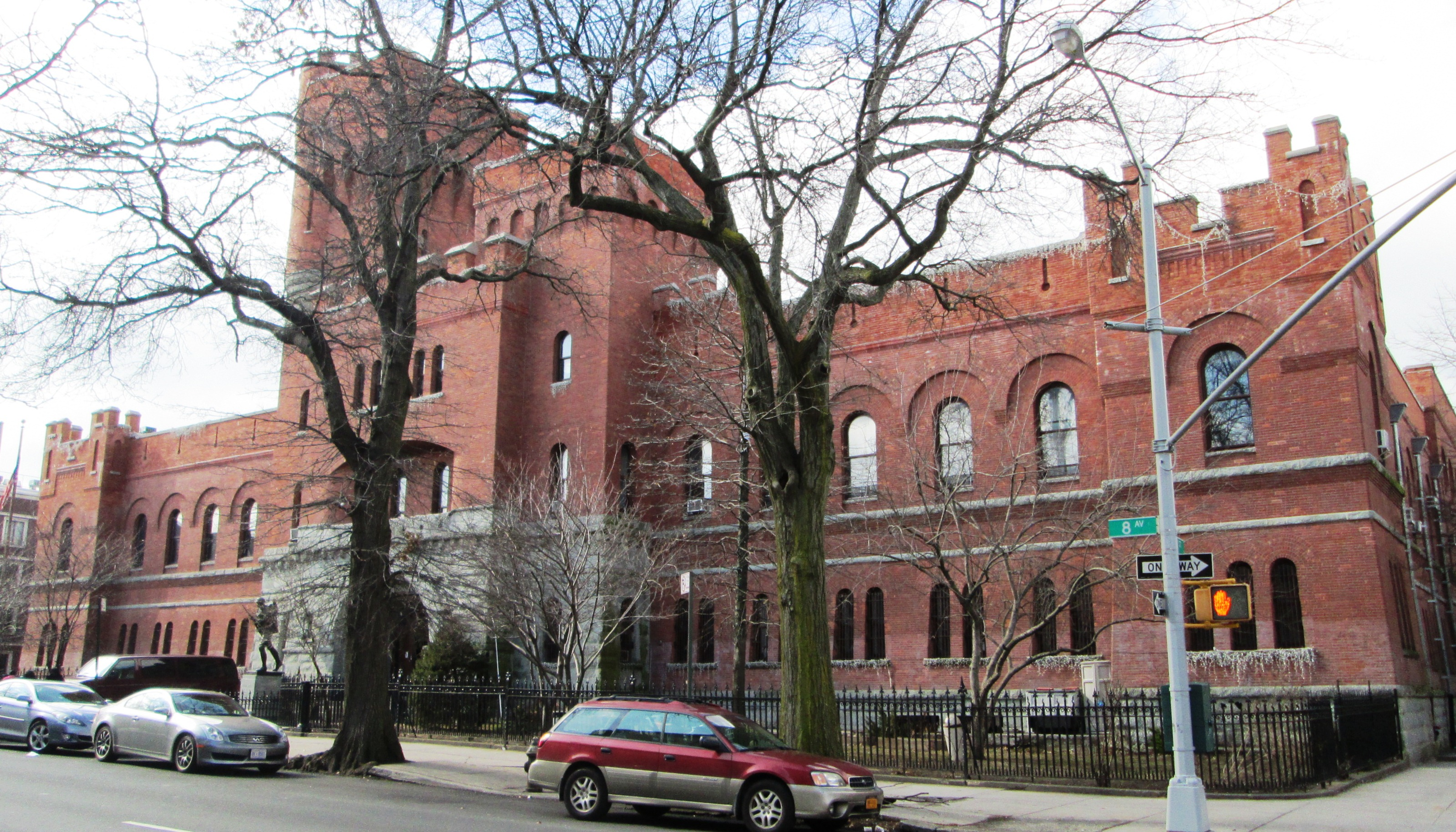
View from the east

A budget appropriation of $300,000 was given for construction, though the lowest bid for completion of this work was $340,000. The commission asked for another $100,000 appropriation in early 1892. The Brooklyn Daily Eagle called the drastic cost increases as "a scandal of no common dimensions", and The New York Times described the armory as one of three Brooklyn armories facing extreme cost overruns, the others being the 13th Regiment Armory in Bedford–Stuyvesant and the 23rd Regiment Armory in Crown Heights. When the Commission asked for a third appropriation of $200,000 in 1893, members of the public filed lawsuits, alleging that individual counties might not have the authority to issue bonds to finance the armories' construction. Construction was delayed for a year and the total cost ended up being $650,000, over twice the original allocation.

The cornerstone of the building was laid on December 6, 1894, when the building was nearly complete. The building was substantially complete on August 15, 1895. Twelve days later, the Fourteenth Regiment moved into the new armory building. In 1900, Horgan & Slattery added a new floor and added mezzanine pilings at a cost of $30,000. Six years later, further improvements to the interior were performed for $35,600. The doughboy memorial in front of the Eighth Avenue facade was installed in 1921-1922. In 1934, during the Great Depression, the 14th Regiment Armory and Manhattan's 369th Regiment Armory were used as temporary homeless shelters.

=== Conversion into sports complex and shelter ===
In March 1986, part of the armory became a 70-bed women's homeless shelter called the Park Slope Armory Homeless Shelter. The shelter, one of twenty planned by mayor Ed Koch to provide facilities for 7,000 homeless people, was controversial among residents of Park Slope, who feared that the opening of the shelter would result in an increase in crime. However, by the end of the year, the Times reported no significant increases in crime around the shelter, and that there had been no incidents involving homeless women and the schoolchildren at nearby PS 107.

The armory continued to operate until the state's Division of Military and Naval Affairs took out most of the military presence in 1992. In 1993, the state announced that the National Guard unit at the 14th Regiment Armory would be relocated, but governor George Pataki allocated funds to keep the 8th Regiment and 14th Regiment Armories open. It was officially given to the city in April 1996. The following year, a lawyer who lived in the neighborhood started an unsuccessful campaign to close the shelter.

The building received a major renovation in 2007. A sports complex operated by the Prospect Park YMCA opened within the armory in 2010.

== Architecture ==
The 14th Regiment Armory consists of a two-story administration building with a flat roof, as well as an attached 1.5-story, barrel-vaulted drill shed to its west. The front facade, along Eighth Avenue, is flanked by a pair of towers 3 and 4 stories tall. Upon the 13th, 14th, and 23rd Regiment Armories' completions in the mid-1890s, the New-York Tribune stated that "these three armories are the product of a lavish expenditure ... for the support and encouragement of the militia that has perhaps never been excelled."

The lot measures 200 feet (61 m) on Eighth Avenue and 550 feet (170 m) along 14th and 15th Streets. The building is set back slightly on its main (eastern) side, along Eighth Avenue. The intervening space is filled by a lawn, surrounded with a wrought iron fence. Both sections of the armory take up the entire 200-foot width between 14th and 15th Streets: the administration building takes up 180 feet (55 m) on the eastern portion of the site, while the drill room took up the area 300 feet (91 m) on the western part of the site.

=== Exterior ===
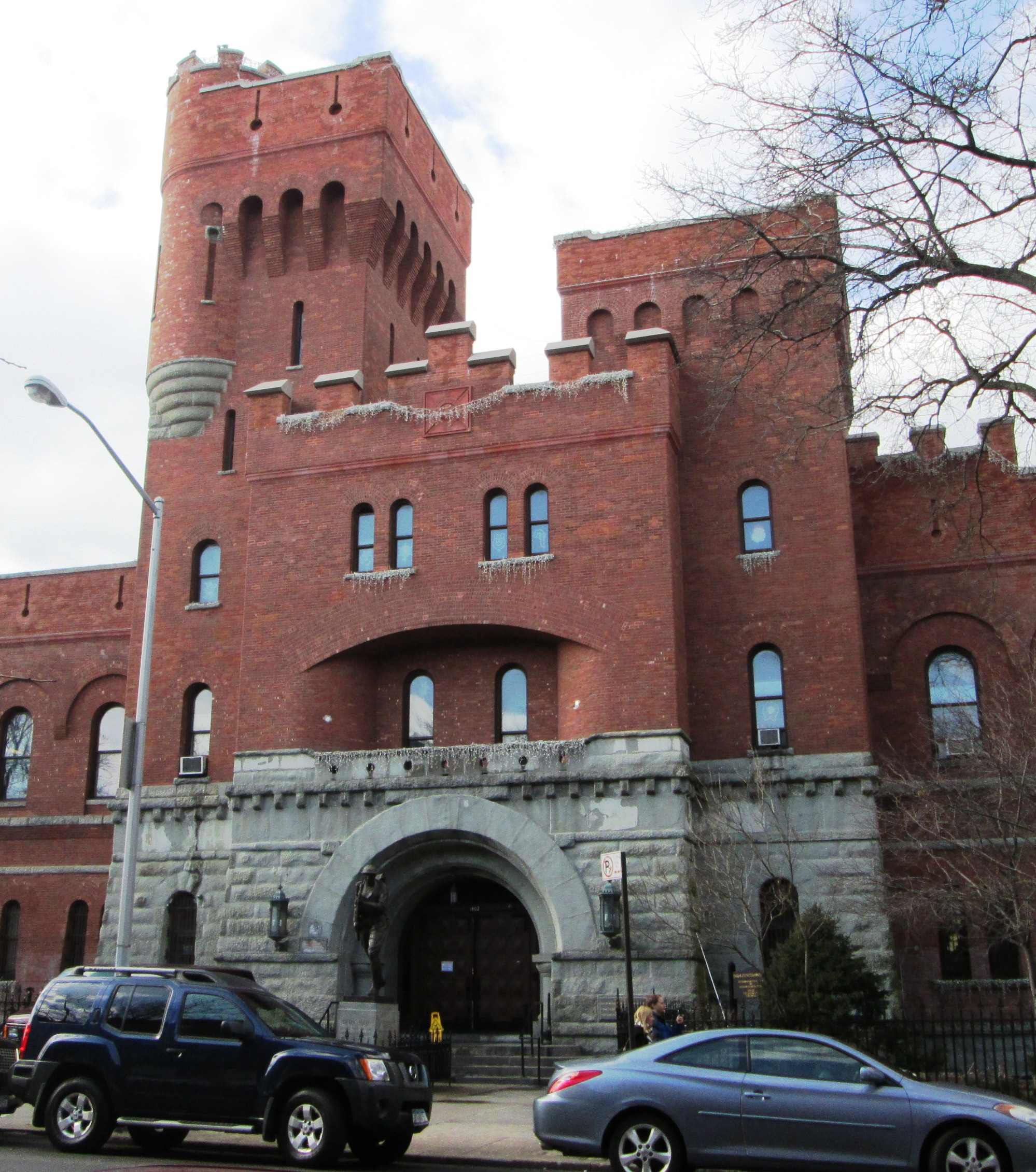
The central section of the Eighth Avenue facade, showing the four-story tower with rounded bartizan (left), the three-story tower (right), and the sally port (bottom)

Both sections are constructed of brick, sit on a stone foundation of Warsaw bluestone, and include bluestone trim and details. On the facade, there are clusters of windows spaced at regular intervals, with between one and three round-arched windowpanes in each window cluster. Many of these window openings contain metal grilles above them.

There is a rectangular, slightly protruding pavilion in the center of the administration building's Eighth Avenue facade, flanked by a pair of side pavilions containing five bays each. The first story of the central pavilion is faced with bluestone, and contains a large round-arched sally port on the first floor. A short flight of steps underneath the sally port lead to three recessed wooden doors at the entrance. The second floor, above the sally port, contains a slightly recessed balcony. Two asymmetrical towers, both containing a brick cornice with machicolation, are located beside the central pavilion. A four-story tower is located on the left (south) side of the central pavilion, and contains a bartizan or small turret projecting from the corner, while a three-story tower is located on the right (north) side of the central pavilion. The towers' first floors are also faced with bluestone.

The 14th and 15th Street facades of the administration building include corner bastions; short projecting towers that roughly bisect this portion of the facade; and chimneys at either western corner. Each side contains nine architectural bays, and each bay contains one window on the second floor and two windows on the first floor. Counting from east to west, the short towers are located between the fifth and sixth bays on each side. These towers, as well as the corner bastions, contain one window on the second floor and three windows on the first floor.

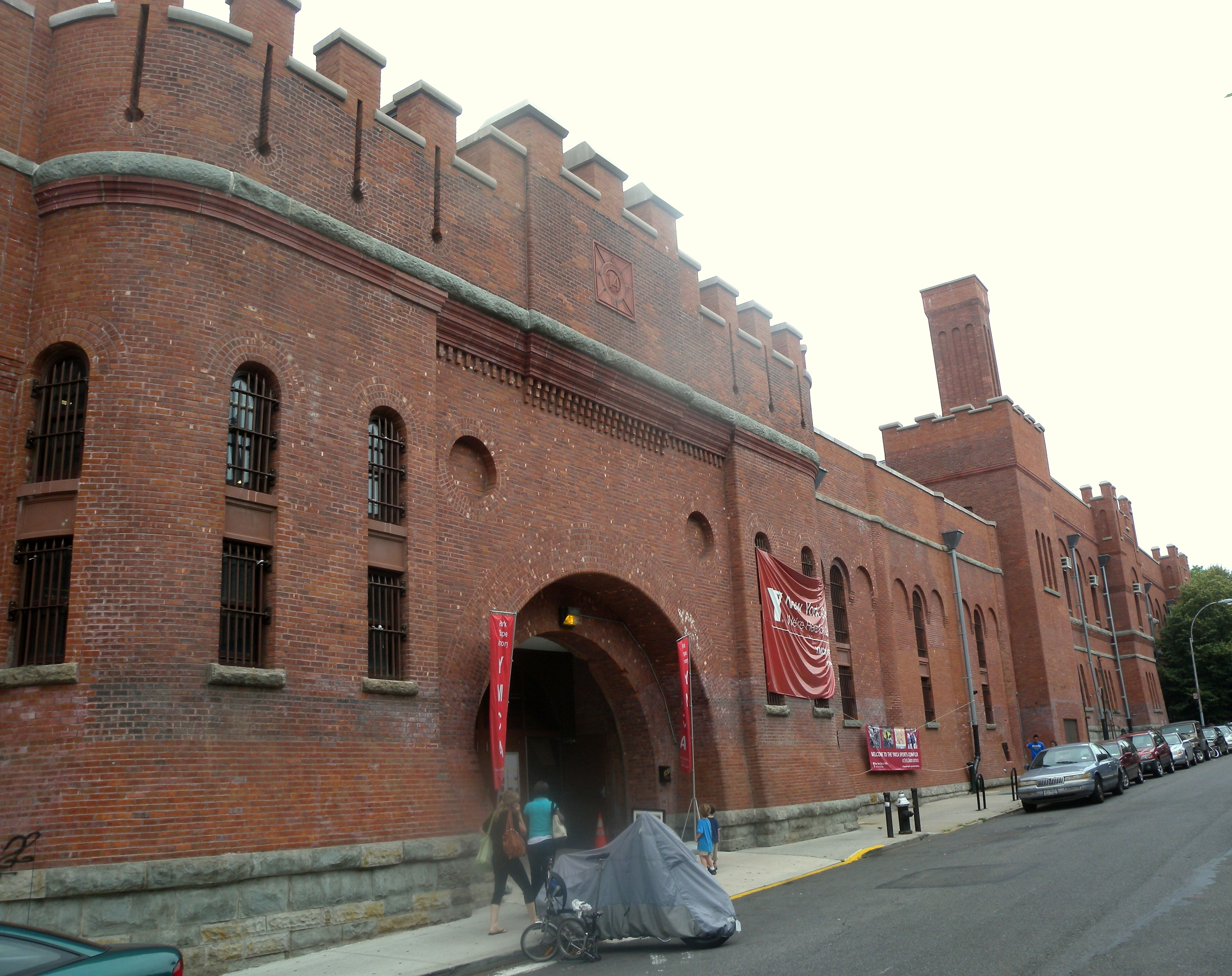
15th Street facade of the drill shed, with sally port in foreground

The facades of the drill shed that face 14th and 15th Streets contain shallow buttresses, with three round arches in each buttress. On each floor, there are windows only in the buttresses' central arches. Projecting sally port entrances are located on the eastern portions of the drill shed facades and contain rough-faced stone. The drill shed's western facade consists of two sections: a windowless wall on the first floor, and a slightly set-back vaulted upper portion. There are seven architectural bays on the top section, with the three central bays each containing a large arched window.

=== Interior ===
The administration building's first floor housed a double-story drill room; an office; the armorers', cadets', and drum corps' quarters; and rooms for each of the 14th Regiment's companies. The second floor contained rooms for the quartermaster, board of officers, and veterans; a gymnasium; various rooms for both non-commissioned and commissioned officers, including an officers' lounge; a surgeon room; officers' and ladies' restrooms; and a lecture & examination room. The third floor tower included a dining room and the superintendent's three-room residence. The drill room contains a gymnasium with a floor area of 70,000 square feet (6,500 m^{2}), which contains several bricked-up apertures from the second floor.

A second set of restrooms, as well as a cue sports room and a bowling alley, were located in the basement under the drill shed. The basement also included an extensive multi-level shooting range, housed in one of the barrel-vaulted spaces. A tunnel led from the basement one block east to Prospect Park, but may have been cut off by the construction of the New York City Subway's Culver Line (carrying the F and G trains), which runs under the western border of Prospect Park.

According to the National Register of Historic Places nomination for the Armory, the administration building's distinctive architectural features included an "imposing entrance hall and main corridors with wood floors, wainscotted and plaster walls, beamed ceilings sheathed with pressed metal, and chestnut display cases." Some of the display cases still survive in the drill room. Other architectural features included Corinthian columns supporting the interior; wooden doors and ornamentation; and a Louis Comfort Tiffany stained-glass window in the main staircase, which was relocated to Staten Island in the late 1990s.

Besides housing the 14th Regiment, the Armory had previously been used for training the Brooklyn Dodgers in 1955-1956 when their regular practice grounds were too wet for training. The space was also used to store balloons for at least one Macy's Thanksgiving Day Parade, and was used as a filming location for Goodfellas (1990), Donnie Brasco (1997), and Meet Joe Black (1998). Today, a veterans' museum is located within the armory, as well as the Prospect Park YMCA's sports facility. A large part of the armory is also used for a women's homeless shelter, which is operated by CAMBA, a non-profit organization based in Flatbush.

== Sculpture ==
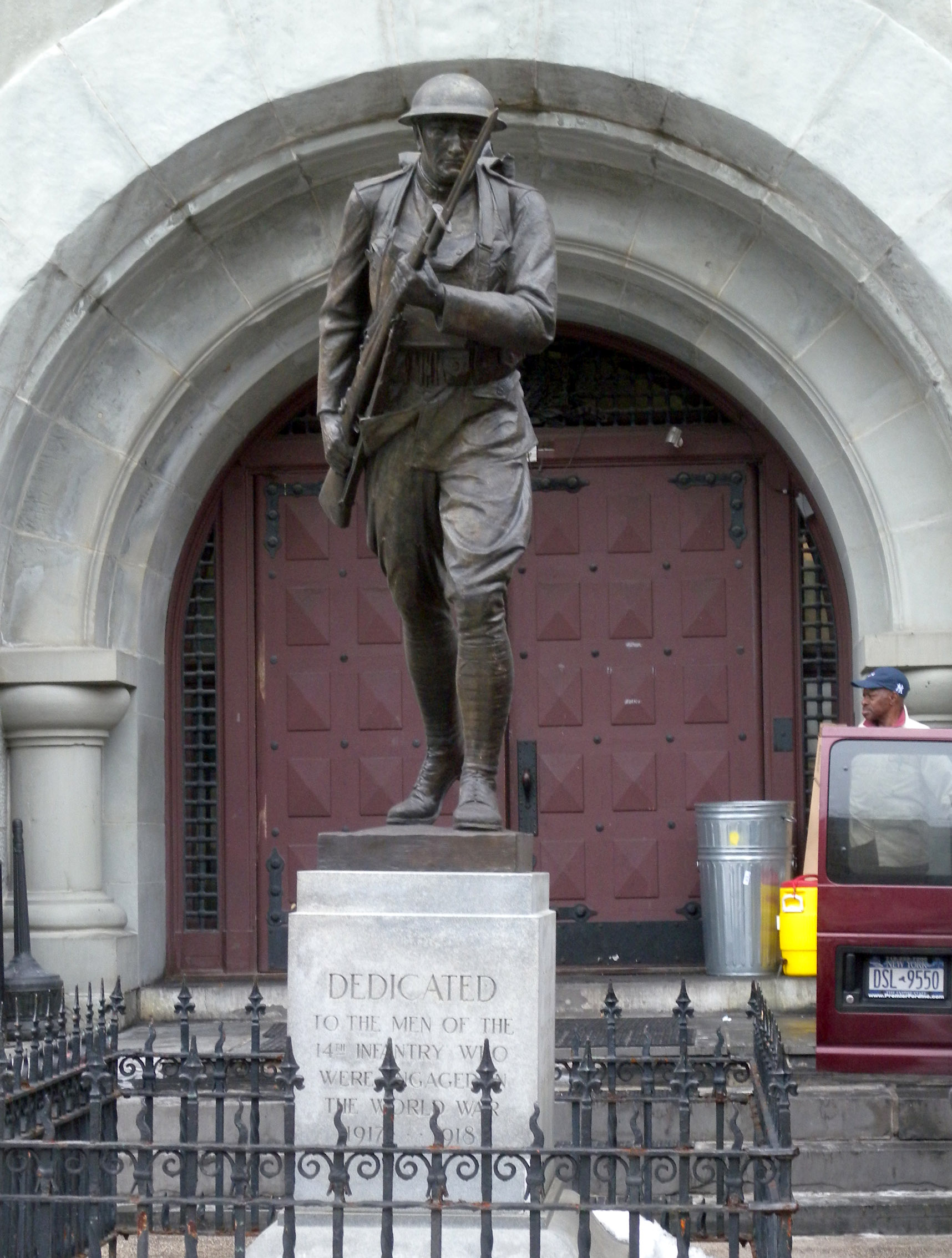
World War I Memorial outside the main entrance features The Doughboy by Anton Scaaf (1925)

A bronze sculpture of a World War I "Doughboy" stands in front of the building. It is dedicated to 360 Fourteenth Regiment soldiers who died in World War I, was donated in 1921 by Gold Star families. The memorial was installed in 1922. The sculpture is located atop a granite pedestal with an inscription reading: "Dedicated to the Men of the 14th Infantry who were engaged in World War 1917–1918". The monument was restored in 1996.

== See also ==
- List of armories and arsenals in New York City and surrounding counties
- List of New York City Designated Landmarks in Brooklyn
- National Register of Historic Places listings in Brooklyn
