= List of St. Francis Brooklyn Terriers men's basketball seasons =

This is a list of seasons completed by the St. Francis Brooklyn Terriers men's college basketball team. The Terriers had an overall record of 1224–1278. Their program was disbanded following the 2022–23 season due to St. Francis' decision to eliminate its entire athletics program caused by budget concerns.

== Season-by-season results ==
St. Francis Brooklyn Terriers
Season	Head coach	Conference	Season results			Postseason Tournament results	
Season	Head coach	Conference	Overall	Conference	Standing	Conference	NCIT, NAIA, CIT, NIT, NCAA
1901–02	Unknown	Unknown	13–1	—	—	—	—
1902–20	Incomplete Records						
1920–21	Brother Phillip	Independent	14–3	—	—	—	—
1921–22	Frank Brennan	Independent	15–7	—	—	—	—
1922–23	Frank Brennan	Independent	21–8	—	—	—	—
1923–24	Frank Brennan	Independent	18–9	—	—	—	—
1924–25	Frank Brennan	Independent	9–8	—	—	—	—
1925–26	Frank Brennan	Independent	1–6	—	—	—	—
1926–27	Nip Lynch	Independent	2–12	—	—	—	—
1927–28	Nip Lynch	Independent	9–8	—	—	—	—
1928–29	Edward Keating	Independent	9–8	—	—	—	—
1929–30	Edward Keating	Independent	6–12	—	—	—	—
1930–31	George Hinchcliffe	Independent	17–16	—	—	—	—
1931–32	George Hinchcliffe	Independent	9–13	—	—	—	—
1932–33	Rody Cooney	Independent	12–9	—	—	—	—
1933–34	Rody Cooney	MTNY	13–11	3–8	6th	—	—
1934–35	Rody Cooney	Independent	12–12	—	—	—	—
1935–36	Rody Cooney	MTNY	15–8	4–6	6th	—	—
1936–37	Rody Cooney	MTNY	13–8	1–5	7th	—	—
1937–38	Rody Cooney	MTNY	14–8	2–4	T-5th	—	—
1938–39	Rody Cooney	MTNY	15–7	15–7	4th	—	—
1939–40	Rody Cooney	Independent	13–5	—	—	—	—
1940–41	Rody Cooney	Independent	9–9	—	—	—	—
1941–42	Joseph Brennan	Independent	16–2	—	—	—	—
1942–43	Joseph Brennan	MTNY	13–7	1–5	7th	—	—
1943–44	Joseph Brennan	Independent	10–6	—	—	—	—
1944–45	Joseph Brennan	Independent	9–9	—	—	—	—
1945–46	Joseph Brennan	MTNY	12–6	3–2	4th	—	—
1946–47	Joseph Brennan	MTNY	14–7	2–3	5th	—	—
1947–48	Joseph Brennan	MTNY	16–9	2–3	6th	—	—
1948–49	Daniel Lynch	MTNY	21–12	2–2	5th	—	NCIT Finals (3–1)
1949–50	Daniel Lynch	MTNY	8–19	0–4	7th	—	NCIT Finals (2–1)
1950–51	Daniel Lynch	MTNY	19–11	2–5	6th	—	NCIT Champions (4–0)
1951–52	Daniel Lynch	MTNY	20–8	4–2	2nd	—	NCIT Third-place game (1–2)
1952–53	Daniel Lynch	MTNY	19–7	2–3	4th	—	—
1953–54	Daniel Lynch	MTNY	21–5	5–0	1st	—	NIT Quarterfinals (1–1)
1954–55	Daniel Lynch	MTNY	17–8	3–3	4th	—	NAIA first round (0–1)
1955–56	Daniel Lynch	MTNY	21–4	4–0	1st	—	NIT Third-place game (2–2)
1956–57	Daniel Lynch	MTNY	12–14	1–2	6th	—	—
1957–58	Daniel Lynch	MTNY	14–9	2–1	3rd	—	—
1958–59	Daniel Lynch	MTNY	5–18	0–3	7th	—	—
1959–60	Daniel Lynch	MTNY	13–8	2–1	3rd	—	—
1960–61	Daniel Lynch	MTNY	10–10	2–1	T-2nd	—	—
1961–62	Daniel Lynch	MTNY	8–15	2–3	4th	—	—
1962–63	Daniel Lynch	MTNY	16–7	4–2	3rd	—	NIT first round (0–1)
1963–64	Daniel Lynch	Independent	9–12	—	—	—	—
1964–65	Daniel Lynch	Independent	11–9	—	—	—	—
1965–66	Daniel Lynch	MCC	5–17	0–9	10th	—	—
1966–67	Daniel Lynch	MCC	15–8	7–2	T-1st	—	—
1967–68	Daniel Lynch	MCC	7–16	0–8	9th	—	—
1968–69	Daniel Lynch	Independent	7–16	—	—	—	—
1969–70	Lester Yellin	Independent	9–12	—	—	—	—
1970–71	Lester Yellin	Independent	8–17	—	—	—	—
1971–72	Lester Yellin	Independent	12–14	—	—	—	—
1972–73	Lester Yellin	Independent	8–16	—	—	—	—
1973–74	Jack Prenderville	Independent	11–13	—	—	—	—
1974–75	Jack Prenderville	Independent	7–19	—	—	—	—
1975–76	Lucio Rossini	Independent	13–13	—	—	—	—
1976–77	Lucio Rossini	Independent	12–14	—	—	—	—
1977–78	Lucio Rossini	Independent	16–9	—	—	—	—
1978–79	Lucio Rossini	Independent	14–12	—	—	—	—
1979–80	Gene Roberti	Independent	11–15	—	—	—	—
1980–81	Gene Roberti	Independent	10–16	—	—	—	—
1981–82	Gene Roberti	Northeast Conference	10–17	8–7	T-3rd North Division	first round (0–1)	—
1982–83	Gene Roberti	Northeast Conference	10–18	7–7	T-3rd North Division	first round (0–1)	—
1983–84	Gene Roberti	Northeast Conference	2–26	1–15	9th	Quarterfinal (0–1)	—
1984–85	Bob Valvano	Northeast Conference	7–21	3–11	8th	Quarterfinal (0–1)	—
1985–86	Bob Valvano	Northeast Conference	9–19	4–12	8th	Quarterfinal (0–1)	—
1986–87	Bob Valvano	Northeast Conference	11–16	5–11	T-7th	DNQ	—
1987–88	Bob Valvano	Northeast Conference	11–18	5–11	7th	Semifinal (1–1)	—
1988–89	Rich Zvosec	Northeast Conference	11–16	5–11	9th	DNQ	—
1989–90	Rich Zvosec	Northeast Conference	9–18	4–12	8th	DNQ	—
1990–91	Rich Zvosec	Northeast Conference	15–14	8–8	5th	Semifinal (1–1)	—
1991–92	Ron Ganulin	Northeast Conference	15–14	8–8	4th	Semifinal (1–1)	—
1992–93	Ron Ganulin	Northeast Conference	9–18	8–10	T-5th	Quarterfinal (0–1)	—
1993–94	Ron Ganulin	Northeast Conference	1–26	1–17	10th	first round (0–1)	—
1994–95	Ron Ganulin	Northeast Conference	9–18	5–13	9th	first round (0–1)	—
1995–96	Ron Ganulin	Northeast Conference	9–18	3–15	9th	first round (0–1)	—
1996–97	Ron Ganulin	Northeast Conference	13–15	7–11	T-7th	Quarterfinals (1–1)	—
1997–98	Ron Ganulin	Northeast Conference	15–12	10–6	T-3rd	Quarterfinal (0–1)	—
1998–99	Ron Ganulin	Northeast Conference	20–8	16–4	2nd	Semifinal (1–1)	—
1999–00	Ron Ganulin	Northeast Conference	18–12	12–6	T-4th	Semifinal (1–1)	—
2000–01	Ron Ganulin	Northeast Conference	18–11	16–4	1st	final (1–1)	—
2001–02	Ron Ganulin	Northeast Conference	18–11	13–7	5th	Semifinal (1–1)	—
2002–03	Ron Ganulin	Northeast Conference	14–16	9–9	T-6th	final (2–1)	—
2003–04	Ron Ganulin	Northeast Conference	15–13	12–6	T-1st	Quarterfinal (0–1)	
2004–05	Ron Ganulin	Northeast Conference	13–15	9–9	7th	Quarterfinal (0–1)	—
2005–06	Brian Nash	Northeast Conference	10–17	7–11	T-8th	DNQ	—
2006–07	Brian Nash	Northeast Conference	9–22	7–11	T-6th	Quarterfinal (0–1)	—
2007–08	Brian Nash	Northeast Conference	7–22	4–14	T-8th	DNQ	—
2008–09	Brian Nash	Northeast Conference	10–20	7–11	8th	Quarterfinal (0–1)	—
2009–10	Brian Nash	Northeast Conference	11–18	8–10	T-8th	DNQ	—
2010–11	Glenn Braica	Northeast Conference	15–15	10–8	5th	Quarterfinal (0–1)	—
2011–12	Glenn Braica	Northeast Conference	15–15	12–6	4th	Quarterfinal (0–1)	—
2012–13	Glenn Braica	Northeast Conference	12–18	8–10	8th	Quarterfinal (0–1)	—
2013–14	Glenn Braica	Northeast Conference	18–14	9–7	T-4th	Quarterfinal (0–1)	—
2014–15	Glenn Braica	Northeast Conference	23–12	15–3	1st	final (2–1)	NIT first round (0–1)
2015–16	Glenn Braica	Northeast Conference	15–17	11–7	T-2nd	Quarterfinal (0–1)	—
2016–17	Glenn Braica	Northeast Conference	4–27	2–16	10th	DNQ	—
2017–18	Glenn Braica	Northeast Conference	13–18	10–8	T-4th	Quarterfinal (0–1)	—
2018–19	Glenn Braica	Northeast Conference	17–16	9–9	T-5th	Quarterfinal (0–1)	CIT first round (0–1)
2019–20	Glenn Braica	Northeast Conference	13–18	7–11	T-7th	Quarterfinal (0–1)	—
2020–21	Glenn Braica	Northeast Conference	9–10	9–9	T-5th	DNQ	—
2021–22	Glenn Braica	Northeast Conference	10–20	7–11	6th	Quarterfinal (0–1)	—
2022–23	Glenn Braica	Northeast Conference	14–16	7–9	T-7th	Quarterfinal (0–1)	—
104; Seasons	17; Head coaches		1279–1342	404–495	3 NEC titles 1 MCC title 2 MTNY titles (Regular Season)	12–34 in NEC Tournament; 0 tournament titles	10–3 in NCIT, 4 bids, 1 Championship; 0–1 in NAIA Tournament, 1 bid 0–1 in CIT, 1 bid 3–5 in NIT, 4 bids 0–0 in NCAA Tournament, 0 bids
Legend
Conference regular season champion Conference tournament champion Conference regular season and conference tournament champion Post-season tournament invitation Post-season tournament champion NCAA national champion
