= List of St. Francis Brooklyn Terriers men's basketball head coaches =

The following is a list of St. Francis Terriers men's basketball head coaches. The Terriers had had 22 coaches in their 112-season history.

Tenure	Coach	Years	Record	Pct.
1920–21	Brother Phillip	1	14–3	.824
1921–26	Frank Brennan	5	64–38	.627
1926–28	Nip Lynch	2	11–20	.355
1928–30	Edward Keating	2	15–20	.429
1930–32	George Hinchcliffe	2	26–29	.473
1932–41	Rody Cooney	9	116–77	.601
1941–48	Joseph Brennan	7	90–46	.662
1948–69	Daniel Lynch	21	282–233	.548
1969–73	Lester Yellin	4	37–59	.385
1973–75	Jack Prenderville	2	18–32	.360
1975–79	Lucio Rossini	4	55–48	.534
1979–84	Gene Roberti	5	43–92	.319
1984–88	Bob Valvano	4	38–74	.339
1988–91	Rich Zvosec	3	35–48	.422
1991–05	Ron Ganulin	14	187–207	.475
2005–10	Brian Nash	5	47–99	.322
2010–23	Glenn Braica	10	145–170	.465
Totals	17 coaches	99 seasons	1223–1295	.486
