= 1956–57 St. Francis Terriers men's basketball team =

American college basketball season

1956–57 St. Francis Terriers men's basketball

NAIA Tip-Off Tournament, Championship Round- L, 67-79 vs. Texas Southern
- Conference: Metropolitan New York Conference
- Record: 12–14 (1–2 MTNY)
- Head coach: Daniel Lynch (9th season)
- Home arena: II Corps Artillery Armory

1956–57 Metropolitan New York Conference men's basketball standings
	Conf.				Overall
Team	W		L	PCT	W		L	PCT
NYU	3	–	1	.750	8	–	13	.381
St. John's	4	–	2	.667	14	–	9	.609
Fordham	2	–	2	.500	16	–	10	.615
Manhattan	2	–	2	.500	5	–	9	.357
CCNY	3	–	4	.429	11	–	8	.579
St. Francis (NY)	1	–	2	.333	12	–	14	.462
Brooklyn	1	–	3	.250	11	–	7	.611
Rankings from AP Poll

The 1956–1957 St. Francis Terriers men's basketball team represented St. Francis College during the 1956–57 NCAA men's basketball season. Daniel Lynch, in his ninth year as head coach, led the team. The Terriers were members of the Metropolitan New York Conference and played their home games at the II Corps Artillery Armory in Park Slope, Brooklyn.

Before the season, Coach Lynch named Walter Adamushko team captain. In a pre-season interview with The New York Times, Lynch expressed concerns about the team's prospects due to the loss of several players to graduation. The previous season, the Terriers had been nationally ranked and reached the NIT semifinals.

The Terriers competed in the 3rd Annual NAIA Tip-Off Tournament held in Omaha, Nebraska. They defeated Eau Claire State in the first round and Gustavus Adolphus in the second round, but lost to Texas Southern in the championship game.

== Roster ==
1956–57 St. Francis Brooklyn Terriers men's basketball team
Players
Coaches

Pos.	#	Name	Height	Weight	Year	Previous school	Hometown
C	4	Walter Adamushko (C)	6 ft 6 in (1.98 m)	220 lb (100 kg)	Sr	Thomas Jefferson High School	Brooklyn, NY
F		George Fox	6 ft 3 in (1.91 m)	—	Sr
F		John Prenderville	6 ft 5 in (1.96 m)	—	Sr
F	16	Ed Hynes	6 ft 4 in (1.93 m)	—	Sr
C	19	Al Innis	6 ft 6 in (1.98 m)	—	Jr
G	15	Lester Yellin	6 ft 0 in (1.83 m)	—	Jr
G	14	Anthony D'Elia	5 ft 11 in (1.8 m)	—	Jr
G		Ed Aquilone	5 ft 10 in (1.78 m)	—	Jr
F	6	Bob Duane	6 ft 3 in (1.91 m)	—	Jr
F	11	Terry Dugan	6 ft 4 in (1.93 m)	—	So
F	18	George Achenbach	6 ft 3 in (1.91 m)	—	Sr
G	5	Long	5 ft 8 in (1.73 m)	—
G	9	Birmingham	6 ft 0 in (1.83 m)	—
F	3	Ed Mullaney	6 ft 2 in (1.88 m)	—	So

Head coach

- Daniel Lynch (St. Francis '38)

Assistant coach(es)

Legend

- (C) Team captain
- (S) Suspended
- (I) Ineligible
- (W) Walk-on
- Injured
- Current redshirt

Roster

== Schedule and results ==
Date time, TV	Opponent	Result	Record	Site city, state
Regular Season
December 8, 1956*	Providence	W 73–64	1–0	II Corps Armory; Brooklyn, NY
December 11, 1956*	Fairfield	W 71–53	2–0	II Corps Armory; Brooklyn, NY
December 15, 1956*	at St. Bonaventure	L 57–79	2–1	Butler Memorial Gym; Olean, New York
December 18, 1956*	Bridgeport	W 83–56	3–1	II Corps Armory; Brooklyn, NY
December 22, 1956*; 8:30 pm	at Yeshiva	W 102–73	4–1	Central High School of Needle Trades; New York, NY
December 27, 1956*	vs. Eau Claire State; NAIA Tip-Off Tournament	W 69–62	5–1	Omaha, NE
December , 1956*	vs. Gustavus Adolphus; NAIA Tip-Off Tournament	W 79–67	6–1	Omaha, NE
December 29, 1956*	vs. Texas Southern; NAIA Tip-Off Tournament	L 67–79	6–2	Omaha, NE
January 4, 1957*	at St. Joseph's (PA)	L 70–78	6–3	Hagan Arena; Philadelphia, PA
January 8, 1957	Brooklyn College	W 89–67	7–3 (1–0)	II Corps Armory; Brooklyn, NY
January 10, 1957*	Dayton	L 60–84	7–4	Madison Square Garden (4,123); New York, NY
January 14, 1957*	Fairleigh Dickinson	L 82–85	7–5	II Corps Armory; Brooklyn, NY
January 19, 1957	St. John's	L 66–68	7–6 (1–1)	II Corps Armory (5,000); Brooklyn, NY
January 22, 1957*	Siena	W 69–50	8–6	II Corps Armory; Brooklyn, NY
January 26, 1957*	Ithaca	W 76–70	9–6	II Corps Armory; Brooklyn, NY
January 28, 1957*	Seton Hall	L 71–80	9–7	II Corps Armory (2,500); Brooklyn, NY
January 30, 1957*	at Duquesne	L 67–71	9–8	Fitzgerald Field House; Pittsburgh, PA
February 2, 1957*	at Siena	L 71–73	9–9	Albany, NY
February 5, 1957*	Queens	W 72–54	10–9	II Corps Armory; Brooklyn, NY
February 9, 1957*	at LeMoyne	L 71–77	10–10	Onondaga County War Memorial; Syracuse, NY
February 12, 1957	at CCNY	L 67–70	10–11 (1–2)	New York, NY
February 14, 1957*	at Saint Peter's	W 87–80	11–11	Jersey City Armory; Jersey City, NJ
February 16, 1957*	at Holy Cross	L 86–99	11–12	Worcester Memorial Auditorium; Worcester, MA
February 21, 1955*	Adelphi	W 97–83	12–12	Garden City, NY
February 28, 1957*	Iona	L 80–94	12–13	Madison Square Garden; New York, NY
March 2, 1957*	at Loyola (Baltimore)	L 74–83	12–14	Baltimore, MD
*Non-conference game. ^{#}Rankings from AP Poll. (#) Tournament seedings in parentheses. All times are in Eastern Time.

== NBA draft ==
At the end of the season, Walter Adamushko was selected with the 42nd overall pick by the Detroit Pistons.

== Awards ==
- Alvin Innniss

All-Metropolitan Selection by the Metropolitan Basketball Writers’ Association.
