= 1955–56 St. Francis Terriers men's basketball team =

American college basketball season

1955–56 St. Francis Terriers men's basketball

Metropolitan New York Conference Regular-Season Champions Middle Eastern College Athletic Association Regular-Season Champions

NIT, 4th Place, L 82–93
- Conference: Metropolitan New York Conference
- Record: 21–4 (4–0 MTNY)
- Head coach: Daniel Lynch (8th season)
- Home arena: II Corps Artillery Armory

1955–56 Metropolitan New York Conference men's basketball standings
| | Conf. | | | | Overall |
| Team | W | | L | PCT | W | | L | PCT |
|---|---|---|---|---|---|---|---|---|
| St. Francis (NY) | 4 | – | 0 | 1.000 | 21 | – | 4 | .840 |
| Manhattan | 4 | – | 1 | .800 | 16 | – | 8 | .667 |
| Brooklyn | 2 | – | 2 | .500 | 11 | – | 7 | .611 |
| NYU | 2 | – | 2 | .500 | 10 | – | 8 | .556 |
| St. John's | 3 | – | 3 | .500 | 12 | – | 12 | .500 |
| Fordham | 2 | – | 2 | .500 | 11 | – | 12 | .478 |
| CCNY | 0 | – | 7 | .000 | 4 | – | 14 | .222 |
Rankings from AP Poll

The 1955–1956 St. Francis Terriers men's basketball team represented St. Francis College during the 1955–56 NCAA men's basketball season. The team was coached by Daniel Lynch, who was in his eighth year at the helm of the St. Francis Terriers. The team was a member of the Metropolitan New York Conference and played their home games at the II Corps Artillery Armory in Park Slope, Brooklyn.

In addition to their membership in the Metropolitan New York Conference, the Terriers were also charter members of the Middle Eastern College Athletic Association beginning this season and won the championship of that conference with a record of 4–1 against conference opponents.

The Terriers were led by Al Innis, Dan Mannix, Walt Adamushko, and Tony D'Elia in the 1955–56 season and were ranked as high as 13th nationally. The team at one point won 18 straight games and upset Niagara to reach the NIT Semi-Finals, before falling to Dayton. Also of note, Al Inniss set the St. Francis single-game rebounding record with 37 against Lafayette in the First Round of the National Invitational Tournament.

== Roster ==
1955–56 St. Francis Brooklyn Terriers men's basketball team
Players
Coaches

| Pos. | # | Name | Height | Weight | Year | Previous school | Hometown |
|---|---|---|---|---|---|---|---|
| F | | Dan Smith | 6 ft 3 in (1.91 m) | — | Sr |
| G | 9 | Jim Murphy | 5 ft 11 in (1.8 m) | — | Sr |
| F | 8 | Dan Mannix (C) | 6 ft 1 in (1.85 m) | — | Sr |
| C | 4 | Walter Adamushko | 6 ft 6 in (1.98 m) | 245 lb (111 kg) | Jr | Thomas Jefferson High School | Brooklyn, NY |
| F | 11 | George Fox | 6 ft 3 in (1.91 m) | — | Jr |
| F | 16 | John Prenderville | 6 ft 5 in (1.96 m) | — | Jr |
| F | 7 | Ed Hynes | 6 ft 4 in (1.93 m) | — | Jr |
| C | 19 | Al Innis | 6 ft 6 in (1.98 m) | — | So |
| G | 15 | Lester Yellin | 6 ft 0 in (1.83 m) | — | So |
| G | 14 | Tony D'Elia | 5 ft 11 in (1.8 m) | — | So |
| G | 17 | Ed Aquilone | 5 ft 10 in (1.78 m) | — | So |
| F | 6 | Bob Duane | 6 ft 3 in (1.91 m) | — | So |

Head coach

- Daniel Lynch (St. Francis '38)

Assistant coach(es)

Legend

- (C) Team captain
- (S) Suspended
- (I) Ineligible
- (W) Walk-on
- Injured
- Current redshirt

== Schedule and results ==
| Date time, TV | Rank^{#} | Opponent^{#} | Result | Record | Site city, state |
Regular Season
| December 3, 1955* | | Loyola (Baltimore) | W 85–65 | 1–0 | II Corps Armory (2,000); Brooklyn, NY |
| December 6, 1955* | | Adelphi | W 101–83 | 2–0 | II Corps Armory (1,000); Brooklyn, NY |
| December 9, 1955* | | at Fairfield | W 85–47 | 3–0 | Brass Recreation Center (400); Bridgeport, CT |
| December 10, 1955* | | at Providence | W 91–67 | 4–0 | Alumni Hall (1,500); Providence, RI |
| December 14, 1955* | | St. Bonaventure | W 79–77 | 5–0 | II Corps Armory; Brooklyn, NY |
| December 17, 1955* | | at Fairleigh Dickinson | W 100–75 | 6–0 | Rutherford, NJ |
| December 19, 1955* | | Yeshiva | W 93–68 | 7–0 | II Corps Armory; Brooklyn, NY |
| December 23, 1955* | | at Queens | W 87–63 | 8–0 | Fitzgerald Gymnasium; Flushing, NY |
| January 10, 1956 | | CCNY | W 76–56 | 9–0 (1–0) | II Corps Armory; Brooklyn, NY |
| January 14, 1956*; 8:30 pm | | Siena | W 83–61 | 10–0 | II Corps Armory; Brooklyn, NY |
| January 21, 1956 | | vs. St. John's | W 76–73 | 11–0 (2–0) | 69th Regiment Armory (4,000); New York, NY |
| January 26, 1956* | No. 15 | at Seton Hall | W 81–78 | 12–0 | Walsh Gymnasium (3,218); South Orange, NJ |
| January 28, 1956* | No. 15 | Ithaca | W 101–49 | 13–0 | II Corps Armory (2,000); Brooklyn, NY |
| January 31, 1956* | No. 13 | Saint Peter's | W 92–82 | 14–0 | II Corps Armory; Brooklyn, NY |
| February 3, 1956* | No. 13 | Creighton | W 99–75 | 15–0 | II Corps Armory; Brooklyn, NY |
| February 8, 1956* | No. 16 | at Bridgeport | W 84–77 | 16–0 | Harvey Hubbell Gymnasium; Bridgeport, CT |
| February 14, 1956 | No. 13 | at Manhattan | W 98–75 | 17–0 (3–0) | II Corps Armory; Brooklyn, NY |
| February 15, 1956 | No. 13 | at Brooklyn College | W 94–74 | 18–0 (4–0) | Roosevelt Gymnasium; Brooklyn, NY |
| February 18, 1956* | No. 13 | at Saint Joseph's (PA) | L 76–80 | 18–1 | Palestra; Philadelphia, PA |
| February 23, 1956*; 7:30 pm | No. 16 | vs. Iona | L 86–97 | 18–2 | Madison Square Garden; New York, NY |
| February 25, 1956* | No. 16 | at Siena | W 71–70 | 19–2 | Washington Avenue Armory; Albany, NY |
National Invitation Tournament
| March 17, 1956*; 1:00 pm | | vs. Lafayette; First Round | W 85–74 | 20–2 | Madison Square Garden (10,058); New York, NY |
| March 19, 1956*; 7:30 pm | | vs. Niagara; Quarterfinals | W 74–72 ^{OT} | 21–2 | Madison Square Garden; New York, NY |
| March 22, 1956* | | vs. No. 3 Dayton; Semifinals | L 58–89 | 21–3 | Madison Square Garden (16,125); New York, NY |
| March 24, 1956*; 1:00 pm | | vs. Saint Joseph's (PA); Consolation Game | L 82–93 | 21–4 | Madison Square Garden; New York, NY |
*Non-conference game. ^{#}Rankings from AP Poll. (#) Tournament seedings in parentheses. All times are in Eastern Time.

== Rankings ==
Ranking movement Legend: ██ Increase in ranking. ██ Decrease in ranking.
| Poll | Dec. 6 | Dec. 13 | Dec. 20 | Dec. 27 | Jan. 3 | Jan. 10 | Jan. 17 | Jan. 24 | Jan. 31 | Feb. 7 | Feb. 14 | Feb. 21 | Feb. 28 | Mar. 3 | Final |
|---|---|---|---|---|---|---|---|---|---|---|---|---|---|---|---|
| AP | | | | | | | | 15 | 13 | 16 | 13 | 16 | | | |

== NBA draft ==
At the end of the season Dan Mannix was selected with the 63rd overall pick by the Rochester Royals.

== Awards ==
- Alvin Innniss

All-Metropolitan Selection by the Metropolitan Basketball Writers’ Association.

- Daniel Mannix

All-Metropolitan Selection by the Metropolitan Basketball Writers’ Association.
