= Valvano =

Valvano is a surname. Notable people with the surname include:

- Bob Valvano (born 1957), American sportscaster, brother of Jim
- Jim Valvano (1946–1993), American college basketball player, coach, and broadcaster
