= Brian Nash =

Brian Nash may refer to:

- Brian Nash (musician)
- Brian Nash (basketball)
