= 1950–51 St. Francis Terriers men's basketball team =

American college basketball season

1950–51 St. Francis Terriers men's basketball

National Catholic Invitation Tournament, Champions
- Conference: Metropolitan New York Conference
- Record: 19–11 (1–5 Metropolitan New York Conference)
- Head coach: Daniel Lynch (3rd season)
- Assistant coach: Marty O'Donnell
- Home arena: Butler Street Gymnasium; II Corps Artillery Armory

1950–51 Metropolitan New York Conference men's basketball standings
	Conf.				Overall
Team	W		L	PCT	W		L	PCT
No. 9 St. John's (NY)	6	–	0	1.000	26	–	5	.839
Fordham	3	–	3	.500	19	–	8	.704
NYU	3	–	2	.600	12	–	4	.750
Manhattan	3	–	2	.600	16	–	6	.727
CCNY	2	–	2	.500	12	–	7	.632
St. Francis (NY)	1	–	5	.167	19	–	11	.633
Brooklyn	0	–	5	.000	9	–	7	.563
Rankings from AP Poll

The 1950–1951 St. Francis Terriers men's basketball team represented St. Francis College during the 1950–51 NCAA Division I men's basketball season. The team was coached by Daniel Lynch, who was in his third year at the helm of the St. Francis Terriers. The Terriers played home games at the Bulter Street Gymnasium in their Cobble Hill, Brooklyn campus and at the II Corps Artillery Armory in Park Slope, Brooklyn.

In the NCIT championship game Ray Rudzinski scored 26 points, Vernon Stokes scored 22 and Roy Reardon scored 21 points en route to victory in Albany, New York.

== Roster ==
1950–51 St. Francis Brooklyn Terriers men's basketball team
Players
Coaches

Pos.	#	Name	Height	Weight	Year	Previous school	Hometown
F		Roy Reardon (C)	6 ft 2 in (1.88 m)	—	Sr
G		James Luisi (C)	6 ft 2 in (1.88 m)	—	Sr	Benjamin Franklin High School	East Harlem, New York
G		Steve Ellsworth	5 ft 10 in (1.78 m)	—	Sr	St. Michael's High School
		Martin Conway	6 ft 3 in (1.91 m)	—	Jr
G		Ray Rudzinski	6 ft 0 in (1.83 m)	—	Jr
F		Vern Stokes	6 ft 2 in (1.88 m)	—	So
		Frank Sainato	5 ft 8 in (1.73 m)	—	So
G		George Searing	5 ft 11 in (1.8 m)	—	Fr
C		Hank Daubenschmidt	6 ft 7 in (2.01 m)	—	Fr	Bronx, NY
F		Jack Walsh	6 ft 4 in (1.93 m)	—	Fr
C		Jack Prenderville	6 ft 4 in (1.93 m)	—
G		Marty Donohue	6 ft 3 in (1.91 m)	—
F		Tom Coogan	6 ft 4 in (1.93 m)	—
		Dick Joyce	6 ft 3 in (1.91 m)	—
		Gerard Lenze	6 ft 1 in (1.85 m)	—

Head coach

- Daniel Lynch (St. Francis '38)

Assistant coach(es)

Marty O'Donnell

Legend

- (C) Team captain
- (S) Suspended
- (I) Ineligible
- (W) Walk-on
- Injured
- Current redshirt

== Schedule ==
Date time, TV	Opponent	Result	Record	Site city, state
Regular Season
November 14, 1950*	Fort Monmouth	W 96–56	1–0	Butler Campus Gymnasium; Brooklyn, NY
November 17, 1950*	Pratt Institute	W 77–42	2–0	Butler Campus Gymnasium; Brooklyn, NY
November 21, 1950*	at Yeshiva	W 82–59	3–0	Queens, NY
November 25, 1950	vs. CCNY	L 62–81	3–1 (0–1)	Madison Square Garden (10,000); New York, NY
December 2, 1950*	at Adelphi	W 86–67	4–1	Garden City, NY
December 8, 1950	at Brooklyn College	L 54–60	4–2 (0–2)	II Corps Artillery Armory; Brooklyn, NY
December 13, 1950; 8:30 pm	Manhattan	L 58–72	4–3 (0–3)	II Corps Artillery Armory; Brooklyn, NY
December 16, 1950	Saint Peter's	W 64–56	5–3 (0–3)	II Corps Artillery Armory; Brooklyn, NY
December 20, 1950*	at Loyola (Baltimore)	W 80–68	6–3	Evergreen Gymnasium; Baltimore, MD
December 21, 1950*	at Quantico Marines	L 73–83	6–4	Quantico, VA
January 5, 1951*	Saint Francis (PA)	L 71–74	6–5	II Corps Artillery Armory; Brooklyn, NY
January 6, 1951*	vs. Kings College	W 67–61	7–5	Westchester County Center; White Plains, NY
January 10, 1951	at Fordham	W 65–63	8–5 (1–3)	Rose Hill Gymnasium (2,500); Bronx, NY
January 12, 1951*	Muhlenberg College	W 88–74	9–5	II Corps Artillery Armory; Brooklyn, NY
January 20, 1951*	at Niagara	L 59–64	9–6	Memorial Auditorium; Buffalo, NY
January 26, 1951*	Texas Wesleyan	W 76–62	10–6	II Corps Artillery Armory; Brooklyn, NY
January 30, 1951	at NYU	L 58–69	10–7 (1–4)	Alumni Memorial Gymnasium (1,000); New York, NY
February 2, 1951	No. 9 St. John's	L 38–44	10–8 (1–5)	II Corps Artillery Armory (4,000); Brooklyn, NY
February 7, 1951*	at New York State Maritime College	W 75–48	11–8	Fort Schuyler Court; Throggs Neck, NY
February 10, 1951*	at Iona	W 75–48	12–8	Westchester County Center; White Plains, NY
February 12, 1951*	at Boston College	L 58–63	12–9	Boston Garden (2,000); Boston, MA
February 16, 1951*	Seton Hall	L 69–70	12–10	II Corps Artillery Armory (1,500); Brooklyn, NY
February 23, 1951*	Siena	W 63–61	13–10	II Corps Artillery Armory; Brooklyn, NY
February 24, 1951*	New Britain State Teachers College	W 70–66	14–10	II Corps Artillery Armory; Brooklyn, NY
March 2, 1951*	at Kent State	L 71–73	14–11	Cleveland Arena; Cleveland, OH
March 3, 1951*	at Baldwin Wallace	W 60–59	15–11	Rudolph Ursprung Gymnasium; Berea, OH
National Catholic Invitation Tournament
March 13, 1951*	vs. Spring Hill; First Round	W 74–65	16–11	Washington Avenue Armory; Albany, NY
March 15, 1951*	vs. Loras; Quarterfinals	W 65–63	17–11	Washington Avenue Armory; Albany, NY
March 16, 1951*	vs. Le Moyne; Semifinals	W 84–66	18–11	Washington Avenue Armory (3,300); Albany, NY
March 17, 1951*	vs. Seattle; Finals	W 93–79	19–11	Washington Avenue Armory; Albany, NY
*Non-conference game. ^{#}Rankings from AP Poll. (#) Tournament seedings in parentheses. All times are in Eastern Time.

== National Catholic Invitation Tournament ==
The tournament took place at the Albany Armory in Albany, NY from March 13 to March 17.

First round
St. Francis (NY)	74
Spring Hill	65
Le Moyne	95
Saint Michael's	57
Iona	54
St. Mary's (MN)	52
Mount St. Mary's	91
St. Norbert	59

Quarter-finals
Loras	63
St. Francis (NY)	65
Siena	53
Le Moyne	57
Seattle	69
Iona	67
Saint Francis (PA)	74
Mount St. Mary's	83

Semi-finals
St. Francis (NY)	84
Le Moyne	66
Seattle	102
Mount St. Mary's	85

Final
St. Francis (NY)	93
Seattle	79
Third place
Le Moyne	63
Mount St. Mary's	61

== NBA draft ==
At the end of the season two Terriers were drafted by the NBA. Jim Luisi was selected 56th overall by the Boston Celtics. Roy Reardon was selected with the 64th overall pick by the Syracuse Nationals.
