= 1941–42 St. Francis Terriers men's basketball team =

American college basketball season

1941–42 St. Francis Terriers men's basketball
- Conference: Independent
- Record: 16–2
- Head coach: Joseph Brennan (1st season)
- Home arena: Bulter Street Gymnasium

The 1941–42 St. Francis Terriers men's basketball team represented St. Francis College during the 1941–42 NCAA men's basketball season. The team was coached by future Basketball Hall of Famer Joseph Brennan, who was in his first year at the helm of the St. Francis Terriers. The team was not part of a conference and played as division I independents. The Terriers played their home games at the Bulter Street Gymnasium in their Cobble Hill, Brooklyn campus.

The 1941–41 team finished with a .889 record at 16–2.

== Roster ==
1941–42 St. Francis Brooklyn Terriers men's basketball team
Players
Coaches

Pos.	#	Name	Height	Weight	Year	Hometown
		Tony Braginetz (C)	—	—	Sr
		Jerry Bussell	6 ft 4 in (1.93 m)	—	Sr
		Jim Agoglia	—	—	Sr
		Ed Lowrie	—	—	Sr
		Charlie Galligan	—	—	Sr
		Art Lockhead	—	—	Jr
		Joe Sydlansky	—	—	Jr
		John McWilliams	—	—	Jr
		Jim Campbell	—	—	Jr
		Ray Rudden	—	—	Jr
		Johnny Armstrong	—	—	So
		Gil Eaton	—	—	So
		Frank Boudert	—	—	So
		Jack Korniewicz	5 ft 5 in (1.65 m)	—	So
		Joe Murphy	—	—	So

Head coach

- Joseph Brennan

Assistant coach(es)

Legend

- (C) Team captain
- (S) Suspended
- (I) Ineligible
- (W) Walk-on
- Injured
- Current redshirt

== Preseason ==
Prior to the season starting former head coach Rody Cooney resigned. He recommended Joseph Brennan or Bob Griebe for the position. Both Joseph and Bob were former Brooklyn Visitations players. Then athletics director Brother Richard O.S.F. hired Joseph and Bob, with Joseph the head coach of the varsity team and Bob of the freshman team.

== Regular season ==
St. Francis won its first nine games and in that span was the highest scoring team in the New York Metropolitan area, averaging 60 points per game. Against La Salle, Jim Agoglia came close to setting an individual scoring record at Madison Square Garden by scoring 20 points. The La Salle game was at Madison Square Garden and the Explorers were the favorites to win, but the Terriers won 50–34.

Their first loss of the season came against N.Y.U. at Madison Square Garden. The Terriers riding a 9-game win streak were the favorites to win but they lost a close game 37–40. The Terriers were leading 23–14 at the half. Coming off their first loss of the season the Terriers defeated Saint Peter's, and set a record in the Metropolitan area for their 85–29 victory. The Terriers then beat Brooklyn College and Manhattan College and were in the running for a National Invitation Tournament spot. The Terriers then lost to CCNY and were out of the running. After the CCNY loss, the Terriers defeated Hofstra and upset St. John's to finish the season at 16–2. Brooklyn sports writers were of the opinion that St. Francis should still qualify for the NIT considering the 16-2 record.

== Schedule and results ==
Date time, TV	Opponent	Result	Record	Site city, state
Regular Season
December 3, 1941	at Brooklyn College of Pharmacy	W 60–40	1–0	Brooklyn College of Pharmacy Gymnasium; Brooklyn, NY
December 6, 1941	at Villanova	W 44–42 ^{2OT}	2–0	Villanova, PA
December 9, 1941	Blue Ridge	W 79–23	3–0	Butler Street Gymnasium; Brooklyn, NY
December 15, 1941	Morris Harvey	W 64–38	4–0	Butler Street Gymnasium; Brooklyn, NY
December 19, 1941; 8:30 pm	Wagner	W 52–28	5–0	Butler Street Gymnasium; Brooklyn, NY
December 29, 1941	Davis & Elkins	W 58–36	6–0	Butler Street Gymnasium; Brooklyn, NY
January 2, 1942; 8:30 pm	Alumni	W 71–41	–	Butler Street Gymnasium; Brooklyn, NY
January 8, 1942; 8:30 pm	Geneva	W 67–52	7–0	Butler Street Gymnasium; Brooklyn, NY
January 17, 1942; 8:30 pm	Siena	W 47–32	8–0	Butler Street Gymnasium; Brooklyn, NY
January 28, 1942; 8:15 pm	La Salle	W 50–34	9–0	Madison Square Garden (18,117); New York, NY
February 4, 1942	vs. NYU	L 37–40	9–1	Madison Square Garden; New York, NY
February 9, 1942	at Saint Peter's	W 85–29	10–1	Jersey City Armory; Jersey City, NJ
February 11, 1942	Brooklyn	W 57–36	11–1	Butler Street Gymnasium; Brooklyn, NY
February 14, 1942	vs. Manhattan	W 31–28	12–1	Madison Square Garden; New York, NY
February 21, 1942	Hudson College (Jersey City, NJ)	W 63–52	13–1	Butler Street Gymnasium; Brooklyn, NY
February 24, 1942	Rider	W 57–36	14–1	Butler Street Gymnasium; Brooklyn, NY
February 28, 1942; 8:30 pm	at City College	L 34–50	14–2	City College Gymnasium (1,500); New York, NY
March 4, 1942	Hofstra	W 67–51	15–2	Butler Street Gymnasium; Brooklyn, NY
March 11, 1942	vs. St. John's	W 49–34	16–2	Madison Square Garden; New York, NY
*Non-conference game. ^{#}Rankings from AP Poll. (#) Tournament seedings in parentheses. All times are in Eastern Time.
