= Stefan Perunicic =

Former professional basketball player

Personal information
- Born: August 9, 1988 Belgrade, SFR Yugoslavia
- Listed height: 6 ft 6 in (1.98 m)
- Listed weight: 195 lb (88 kg)

Career information
- College: St. Francis Brooklyn (2008–2012)
- NBA draft: 2012: undrafted
- Playing career: 2012–2014
- Position: Shooting guard

Career history
- 2012–2013: Trikala Aries B.C.
- 2013–2014: BC Alytus

Stefan Perunicic (born in 1988) is a former Serbian professional basketball player. In college, he played in the United States for St. Francis College in Brooklyn, New York. Professionally, he played for one season with Trikala Aries B.C., then part of the Greek Basket League, and then in Lithuania with BC Alytus, after which he retired at a young age.

== Career ==
Perunicic started playing basketball for the youth team of Torlak in Belgrade, Serbia. At 18 he was recruited by St. Francis in Brooklyn, and spent four years in NCAA Division I. At St. Francis Perunicic became the 27th Terrier to reach 1,000 career points. One of his memorable games was that against Brown, where Perunicic scored 14 points. In 2012 he helped his team win its fourth straight, by scoring 11 points against Fairleigh Dickinson.

Perunicic's NCAA 3-points statistics allowed him be, as of April 2019, the all-time 7th ranked 3-point shooter in the Northeast Conference.

In 2013 Perunicic started his professional career as he was hired by Trikala Aries B.C., then part of the Greek Basket League. He scored 111 points in 25 games during the 2013-2014 season. After one year in Greece, he was hired by the Lithuanian side BC Alytus, however, due to persistent injuries, he retired from professional basketball.
