= 1934–35 St. Francis Terriers men's basketball team =

American college basketball season

1934–35 St. Francis Terriers men's basketball
- Conference: Independent
- Record: 12–12
- Head coach: Rody Cooney (3rd season)
- Home arena: Butler Street Gymnasium

The 1934–35 St. Francis Terriers men's basketball team represented St. Francis College during the 1934–35 NCAA men's basketball season. The team was coached by Rody Cooney, who was in his third year at the helm of the St. Francis Terriers. The team was not part of a conference and played as division I independents. The Terriers played their home games at the Bulter Street Gymnasium in their Cobble Hill, Brooklyn campus.

The 1934–35 team finished with a .500 record at 12–12.

== Roster ==
1934–35 St. Francis Brooklyn Terriers men's basketball team
Players
Coaches

Pos.	#	Name	Height	Weight	Year	Previous school	Hometown
		William Cordts	—	—
G		Tom O'Brien	—	—
		Toohey	—	—
G		John Donnelly	—	—
F		Lou Pesca	—	—
F		Tommy Cuite (C)	—	—
C		Jack Egan	—	—
		Day	—	—
		Jack Flannery	—	—
		Connelly	—	—
		Lenowicz	—	—
C		James Culligan	—	—		Cathedral High School
C		Herman Cordts	—	—
G		Patrick Gleason	—	—
G		Daniel Lynch	—	—

Head coach

- Rody Cooney

Assistant coach(es)

Legend

- (C) Team captain
- (S) Suspended
- (I) Ineligible
- (W) Walk-on
- Injured
- Current redshirt

== Schedule and results ==
Date time, TV	Opponent	Result	Record	Site city, state
Regular Season
November 24, 1934*; 8:30 pm	at CCNY	L 28–39	0–1	New York, NY
December 5, 1934*; 9:00 pm	Brooklyn	W 27–18	1–1	Butler Street Gymnasium; Brooklyn, NY
December 8, 1934*; 8:30pm	at Manhattan	L 14–25	1–2	Manhattan Gymnasium; New York, NY
December 12, 1934*; 9:00pm	at Seth Low Junior College	L 38–42	1–3	Plymouth Institute; Brooklyn, NY
December 15, 1934*; 8:45 pm	at LIU Brooklyn	L 24–47	1–4	Brooklyn College of Pharmacy Gymnasium; Brooklyn, NY
December 19, 1934*; 8:30 pm	at Brooklyn College of Pharmacy	W 35–26	2–4	Brooklyn College of Pharmacy Gymnasium; Brooklyn, NY
December 20, 1934*; 8:30 pm	at Columbus Council K. of C.	W 25–16	3–4	Brooklyn, NY
December 29, 1934*; 8:30 pm	Alumni	W 29–22		Butler Street Gymnasium; Brooklyn, NY
January 5, 1935*; 8:30 pm	at John Marshall College of Law	L 13–43	3–5	Jersey City YMCA; Jersey City, NJ
January 9, 1935*	at Cathedral	W 35–17	4–5	New York, NY
January 10, 1935*; 9:00 pm	Manhattan	L 23–28	4–6	Butler Street Gymnasium; Brooklyn, NY
January 12, 1935*; 8:30 pm	at Brooklyn Polytechnic Institute	W 48–29	5–6	Odd Fellows Hall; Brooklyn, NY
January 17, 1935*; 8:45 pm	NYU	L 11–37	5–7	University Heights Gym; Bronx, NY
January 19, 1935*; 8:30 pm	Saint Peter's	W 21–17	6–7	Butler Street Gymnasium; Brooklyn, NY
January 26, 1935*; 8:30 pm	at St. John's	L 19–37	6–8	DeGray Gymnasium (500); Brooklyn, NY
January 30, 1935*	at Seton Hall	W 35–34	7–8	Orange, NJ
February 2, 1935*; 8:00 pm	at LIU Brooklyn	W 37–11	7–9	Arcadia Hall; Brooklyn, NY
February 6, 1935*	at Rider	L 24–30	7–10	Trenton, NJ
February 9, 1935*; 8:30 pm	at Columbia	W 31–29	8–10	New York, NY
February 13, 1935*; 9:00 pm	Seth Low Junior College	W 33–25 ^{OT}	9–10	Butler Street Gymnasium; Brooklyn, NY
February 20, 1935*; 9:00 pm	John Marshall	L 28–30	9–11	Butler Street Gymnasium; Brooklyn, NY
February 22, 1935*	Baltimore U.	W 29–28	10–11	Butler Street Gymnasium; Brooklyn, NY
February 26, 1935*	vs. Brooklyn College	L 26–39	10–12	Union Temple; Brooklyn, NY
February 27, 1935*	at Saint Peter's	W 29–25	11–12	Jersey City, NJ
March 2, 1935*; 9:00 pm	St. John's	W 29–28	12–12	Butler Street Gymnasium; Brooklyn, NY
*Non-conference game. ^{#}Rankings from AP Poll. (#) Tournament seedings in parentheses. All times are in Eastern Time.
