= 1935–36 St. Francis Terriers men's basketball team =

American college basketball season

1935–36 St. Francis Terriers men's basketball
- Conference: Metropolitan New York Conference
- Record: 15–8 (4–6 MTNY)
- Head coach: Rody Cooney (4th season)
- Home arena: Butler Street Gymnasium

The 1935–36 St. Francis Terriers men's basketball team represented St. Francis College during the 1935–36 NCAA men's basketball season. The team was coached by Rody Cooney, who was in his fourth year at the helm of the St. Francis Terriers. The team was a member of the Metropolitan New York Conference and played its home games at the Bulter Street Gymnasium in their Cobble Hill, Brooklyn campus.

The 1935–36 team finished 15–8 overall and 4–6 in conference play. This was the Terriers first season in which they participated in a post-season tournament. The Terriers were invited to play in the District 1 tryouts at Madison Square Garden for the 1936 Summer Olympics. The Terriers were selected after LIU, NYU and Columbia declined to compete. In the Olympic tryouts the Terriers defeated Springfield College, the birthplace of Basketball, at Madison Square Garden and during the game set two Garden records. They shot 81.3% from the foul line, and 33.3% from the floor. NYU previously held the free-throw percent record and LIU the field-goal percent record, which was previously 16%.

== Roster ==
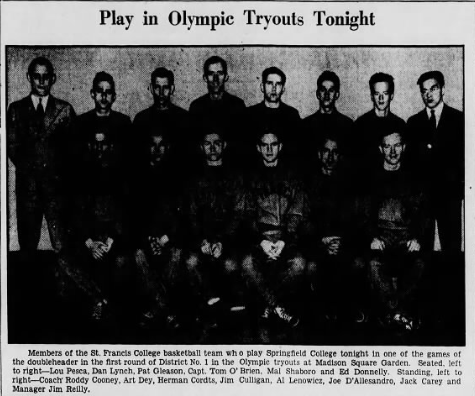
Photo of the 1936 St. Francis Terriers Basketball Team, which was selected to tryout for the 1936 Summer Olympics.

1935–36 St. Francis Brooklyn Terriers men's basketball team
Players
Coaches

Pos.	#	Name	Height	Weight	Year	Previous school	Hometown
F		Al Lenowicz	—	—
F		William Cordts	—	—
C		James Culligan	—	—		Cathedral High School
G		Daniel Lynch	—	—
G		Tom O'Brien (C)	—	—
G		Patrick Gleason	—	—
F		Lou Pesca	—	—
		Jack Flannery	—	—
G		Ed Donnelly	—	—
		Art Dey	—	—
		Jack Carey	—	—
		Joe D'Allesandro	—	—
		Mal Shaboro	—	—
		Herman Cordts	—	—

Head coach

- Rody Cooney

Assistant coach(es)

Legend

- (C) Team captain
- (S) Suspended
- (I) Ineligible
- (W) Walk-on
- Injured
- Current redshirt

== Schedule and results ==
Date time, TV	Opponent	Result	Record	Site city, state
Regular Season
November 30, 1935; 8:30 pm	at CCNY	L 24–38	0–1 (0–1)	CCNY Gymnasium; New York, NY
December 11, 1935*	at Brooklyn College of Pharmacy	W 37–22	1–1	Brooklyn College of Pharmacy Gym; Brooklyn, NY
December 14, 1935	at NYU	L 20–39	1–2 (0–2)	University Heights Gym; Bronx, NY
December 17, 1935	at Columbia	W 32–30	2–2 (1–2)	Morningside Heights Gym; New York, NY
December 20, 1935	at Manhattan	L 28–36	2–3 (1–3)	(1,200)
December 21, 1935*	Seth Low Junior College	L 19–42	2–4	Butler Street Gymnasium; Brooklyn, NY
December 27, 1935*	Alumni	W 42–36		Butler Street Gymnasium; Brooklyn, NY
January 4, 1936*	at Saint Peter's	W 30–23	3–4	Collins Memorial Hall; Jersey City, NJ
January 8, 1936	at Brooklyn	W 35–32 ^{OT}	4–4 (2–3)	Brooklyn, NY
January 11, 1936	at Fordham	L 18–20	4–5 (2–4)	Maroon Gymnasium (2,500); Bronx, NY
January 15, 1936*	at John Marshall College of Law	W 24–22	5–5	Jersey City, NJ
January 18, 1936*	at Seth Low Junior College	W 48–33	6–5	Plymouth Institute
January 29, 1936	at LIU	L 23–31	6–6 (2–5)	Brooklyn College of Pharmacy Gym; Brooklyn, NY
February 1, 1936	at St. John's	L 18–41	6–7 (2–6)	DeGray Gymnasium (1,200); Brooklyn, NY
February 5, 1936*	at Columbus Council	W 29–20	7–7	
February 8, 1936*	Rider	W 35–32	8–7	Butler Street Gymnasium; Brooklyn, NY
February 12, 1936*	Seton Hall	W 50–30	9–7	Butler Street Gymnasium; Brooklyn, NY
February 19, 1936*	Cathedral College	W 49–27	10–7	Butler Street Gymnasium; Brooklyn, NY
February 22, 1936*	John Marshall College of Law	W 37–31	11–7	Butler Street Gymnasium; Brooklyn, NY
February 26, 1936*	Saint Peter's	W 47–27	12–7	Butler Street Gymnasium; Brooklyn, NY
February 29, 1936	at Brooklyn	W 27–25 ^{OT}	13–7 (3–6)	Union Temple Court (1,200); Brooklyn, NY
March 2, 1936*	at St. John's	W 30–22	14–7 (4–6)	DeGray Gymnasium; Brooklyn, NY
1936 Olympics Tryouts
March 18, 1936*	vs. Springfield; District No. 1, Semifinal	W 44–36	15–7	Madison Square Garden; New York, NY
March 20, 1936*; 9:15 pm	vs. Niagara; District No. 1, Final	L 25–30	15–8	Madison Square Garden (4,000); New York, NY
*Non-conference game. ^{#}Rankings from AP Poll. (#) Tournament seedings in parentheses. All times are in Eastern Time.
