= 1941–42 La Salle Explorers men's basketball team =

American college basketball season

1941–42 La Salle Explorers men's basketball
- Conference: Independent
- Record: 12–11
- Head coach: Obie O'Brien (1st season)
- Captain: Charles McGlone
- Home arena: Wister Hall

The 1941–42 La Salle Explorers men's basketball team represented La Salle University during the 1941–42 NCAA men's basketball season. The head coach was Obie O'Brien, coaching the explorers in his first season. The team finished with an overall record of 12–11.

== Schedule ==
Date time, TV	Opponent	Result	Record	Site city, state
Dec 5, 1941	Alumni	W 48–26	1–0	Wister Hall; Philadelphia, PA
Dec. 10, 1941	Morris–Harvey	W 39–27	2–0	Wister Hall; Philadelphia, PA
Dec 12, 1941	Washington College	W 32–16	3–0	Wister Hall; Philadelphia, PA
Dec. 16, 1941	Millersville	W 54–44	4–0	Wister Hall; Philadelphia, PA
Dec. 20, 1941	Niagara	L 37–40	4–1	Wister Hall; Philadelphia, PA
Dec. 29, 1941	Rice	L 41–51	4–2	Wister Hall; Philadelphia, PA
Jan. 2, 1942	Davis-Elkins	W 44–33	5–2	Wister Hall; Philadelphia, PA
Jan. 10, 1942	Scranton	W 44–35	6–2	Wister Hall; Philadelphia, PA
Jan. 13, 1942	Newark	W 67–20	7–2	Wister Hall; Philadelphia, PA
Jan. 17, 1942	at Saint Joseph's	L 53–58	7–3	Wister Hall; Philadelphia, PA
Jan. 28, 1942	St. Francis (NY)	L 34–50	7–4	Wister Hall; Philadelphia, PA
Jan. 30, 1942	at Scranton	W 34–29	8–4	Scranton, PA
Feb. 2, 1942	at Columbus	L 45–47	8–5	
Feb. 3, 1942	at Loyola (MD)	W 46–26	9–5	Evergreen Gymnasium; Baltimore, MD
Feb. 7, 1942	C.C.N.Y.	L 45–48	9–6	Wister Hall; Philadelphia, PA
Feb. 10, 1942	at Rider	W 43–22	10–6	Lawrenceville, NJ
Feb. 14, 1942	Temple	L 38–48	10–7	Wister Hall; Philadelphia, PA
Feb. 24, 1942	Moravian	W 60–50	11–7	Wister Hall; Philadelphia, PA
Feb. 27, 1942	Long Island	L 37–61	11–8	Wister Hall; Philadelphia, PA
Mar. 3, 1942	at Seton Hall	L 37–40	11–9	Walsh Gymnasium; South Orange, NJ
Mar. 6, 1942	Toledo	L 37–65	11–10	Wister Hall; Philadelphia, PA
Mar. 11, 1942	Muhlenberg	W 39–37	12–10	Wister Hall; Philadelphia, PA
Mar. 16, 1942	Yale & Towne	L 43–48	12–11	Wister Hall; Philadelphia, PA
*Non-conference game. (#) Tournament seedings in parentheses.
