= 1920–21 St. Francis Terriers men's basketball team =

American college basketball season

1920–21 St. Francis Terriers men's basketball
- Conference: Independent
- Record: 14–3
- Head coach: Brother Philip

The 1920–21 St. Francis Terriers men's basketball team represented St. Francis College during the 1920–21 NCAA men's basketball season. The team was coached by Brother Philip. The team was not part of a conference and played as a major independent.

The 1920–21 team finished with a .823 record at 14–3. This was Brother Philip's last year as the head coach of St. Francis College.

== Roster ==
1920–21 St. Francis Brooklyn Terriers men's basketball team
Players
Coaches

| Pos. | # | Name | Height | Weight | Year | Hometown |
|---|---|---|---|---|---|---|
| G | | Eddie Keating | 5 ft 7 in (1.7 m) | 143 lb (65 kg) |
| F | | Edgar Moran | 5 ft 7 in (1.7 m) | 145 lb (66 kg) |
| C | | Frank "Nip" Lynch (C) | — | — |
| F | | James Twohy | — | — | So |
| G | | Leon Morgan | — | — |
| F | | Jim Wallace | — | — |
| G | | Paul Pendergast | — | — |
| F | | Tom Maguire | — | — |
| | | Magee | — | — |
| G | | Joe Walsh | — | — |

Head coach

- Brother Philip

Assistant coach(es)

Legend

- (C) Team captain
- (S) Suspended
- (I) Ineligible
- (W) Walk-on
- Injured
- Current redshirt

Roster

== Schedule and results ==
| Date time, TV | Opponent | Result | Record | Site city, state |
Regular Season
| November 12, 1920* | St. Lawrence University Law School | W 45–27 | 1–0 | St. Agnes Hall; Brooklyn, NY |
| November 20, 1920* | at Cooper Union Day School | W 43–22 | 2–0 | Savage Gymnasium; New York, NY |
| November 24, 1920* | at Pratt | W 35–33 | 3–0 | Brooklyn, NY |
| November 26, 1920* | Savage Institute | W 48–16 | 4–0 | St. Agnes Hall; Brooklyn, NY |
| December 1, 1920* | at Seton Hall | L 32–45 | 4–1 | |
| December 7, 1920* | at Crescent Athletic Club | L 23–35 | 4–2 | Crescent Athletic Club House; Brooklyn, NY |
| December 10, 1920* | at Upsala | W 44–22 | 5–2 | Kenilworth, NJ |
| December 17, 1920* | Manhattan | W 30–23 | 6–2 | St. Agnes Hall; Brooklyn, NY |
| December 22, 1920* | Cathedral | W 36–20 | 7–2 | St. Agnes Hall; Brooklyn, NY |
| December 28, 1920* | at Copper Union Night School | W 39–23 | 8–2 | New York, NY |
| January 6, 1921* | St. Francis Alumni | L 21–36 | 8–3 | Arcadia Hall; Brooklyn, NY |
| January 7, 1921* | Copper Union Day School | W 48–26 | 9–3 | St. Agnes Hall; Brooklyn, NY |
| January 8, 1921* | Brooklyn Polytechnic | L 26–27 ^{OT} | 9–4 | |
| January 12, 1921* | NYCC | W 53–17 | 10–4 | |
| January 15, 1921* | Albany Law | W 30–25 | 11–4 | Good Counsel Hall |
| February 1, 1921* | at Manhattan | W 24–21 | 12–4 | |
| February 5, 1921* | Seton Hall | L 28–40 | 12–5 | |
| February 12, 1921* | Boston College | W 33–27 | 13–5 | Good Counsel Hall |
| February 16, 1921* | Fordham | W 41–37 | 14–5 | Good Counsel Hall |
*Non-conference game. ^{#}Rankings from AP Poll. (#) Tournament seedings in parentheses. All times are in Eastern Time.
