= Bishop Ford Central Catholic High School =

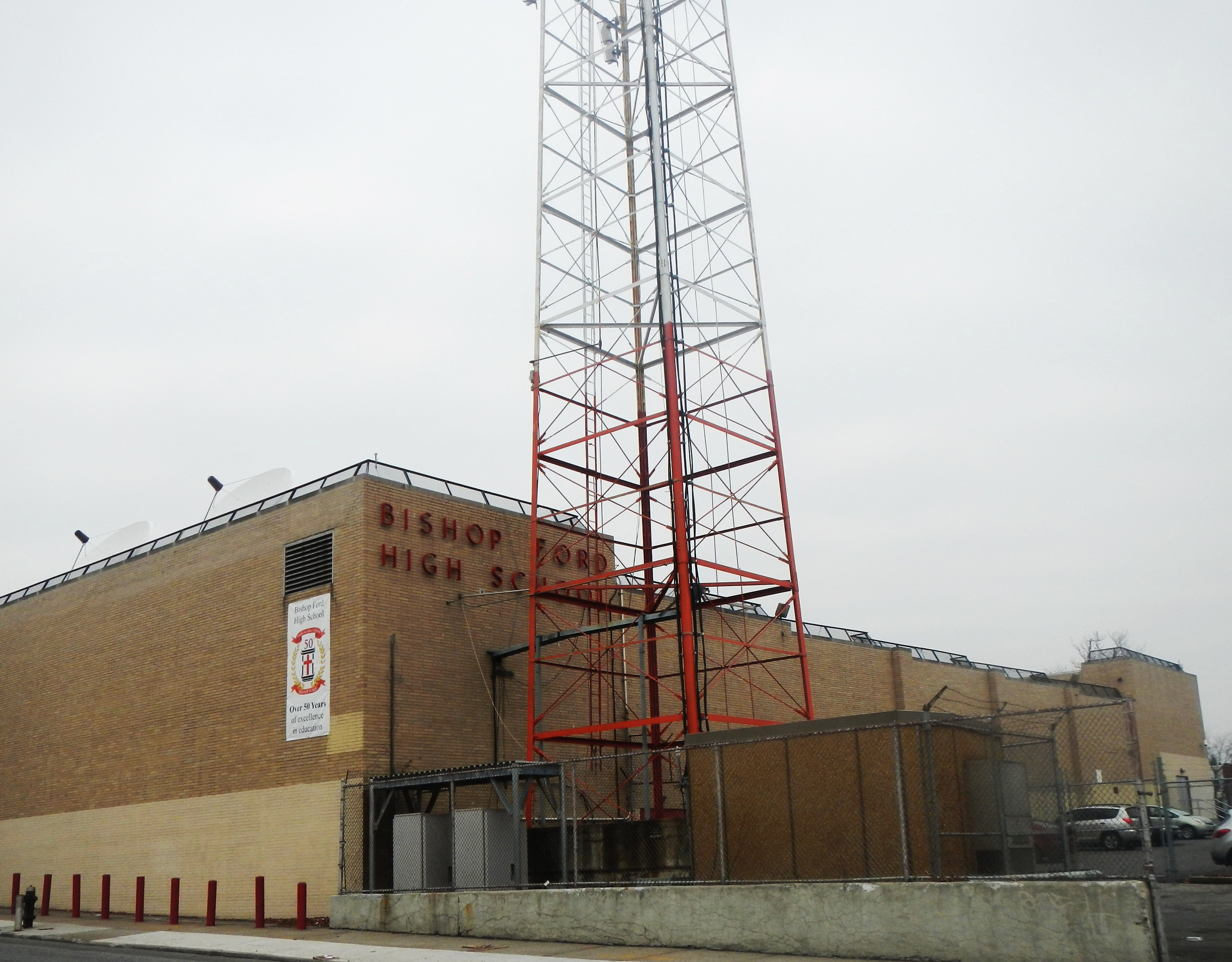

Location
- 500 19th Street; Brooklyn, New York City, US; 40°39′23″N 73°58′57″W

Information
- Type: Private, coeducational
- Motto: Erudio pro Excellentia (Educating for Excellence)
- Religious affiliation: Catholic
- Patron saint: St. Francis of Assisi
- Established: 1962
- Status: closed
- Closed: 2014
- Area trustee: Myles Davis '67
- Principal: Thomas P. Arria
- Faculty: 40
- Grades: 9–12
- Colors: Black, red and gold
- Slogan: Your Children, Our Students, the Nation's Future
- Mascot: Falcon
- Team name: Falcons
- Accreditation: Middle States Association of Colleges and Schools
- Newspaper: Highpoint
- Yearbook: The Pagoda
- Tuition: $8,950 per year
- Dean of Girls: Josephine Herman
- Dean of Boys: Manuel Fernandez
- Admissions Director: Deanna Philippe
- Athletic Director: Peter Goyco '84

Bishop Ford Central Catholic High School was a private, Catholic high school in the Windsor Terrace neighborhood of Brooklyn, New York. Open from 1962 through 2014, it closed following a period of steeply falling enrollment and with an estimated $4 million in outstanding debt. Now called the Bishop Ford Educational Complex, the building is used by New York City Department of Education to house a pre-kindergarten school and two middle schools.

== History ==
Bishop Ford Central Catholic High School was established in 1962 by the Roman Catholic Diocese of Brooklyn. It was named after Bishop Francis Xavier Ford, a Brooklyn native and Maryknoll missionary who was martyred in China in 1952. It was decorated in a Chinese-themed style, with a large red pagoda on its roof, signs with letters in a font meant to suggest Chinese characters, and a red-and-gold tiled lobby with light fixtures shaped like pagodas.

The school was built on the site of the former 9th Avenue bus and trolley depot, used until 1956 for trolleys, and for buses until 1959 following a fire, with bus routes moved to the 5th Avenue (today's Jackie Gleason Depot) & Ulmer Park Depots.

Bishop Ford Central Catholic High School was a Division I high school and had an active PTA and many clubs, activities, and sports. Some of the clubs included the International Society; Martial Arts Club; Science Club; Art Club; Student Activities Committee; Student Council; Newspaper and Yearbook. Bishop Ford Central Catholic High School's sports included cross-country, track and field, swimming, basketball, baseball, football, bowling, soccer, cheerleading, volleyball, and softball as junior varsity and varsity teams.

Following a period of falling enrollment that saw the student body decrease 75%, from 1,347 students in 2006 to 499 in 2014, the school abruptly closed at the end of the 2013–14 school year. It was one of a number of Catholic schools to close around that time, faced with increased competition from public and charter schools.

The school building is now used by the New York City Public School system for pre-k and middle schools. The religious symbols, such as a large cross that once stood above the entrance of the school, have been removed from the school building.

== Notable alumni ==
- Glenn Braica (1982): basketball coach, head coach of the St. Francis College basketball team since 2010
- William DeMeo, actor best known for his acting roles in Analyze That, First Kill and The Sopranos
- John Giuca (born 1983), felon
- John Gray (1976): screenwriter and television director, creator of TV series Ghost Whisperer
- John Halama (1990): Major League Baseball pitcher (1998–2006)
- Armond Hill (1971): professional basketball player in the NBA (1976–1984) and first-round pick in the 1976 NBA draft
- Jimmy Iovine (1971): record producer; co-founder of Interscope Records
- Charles Jones (1993): professional basketball player in the NBA and abroad (1998–2009)
- Jason Mattera (2001): conservative political commentator and author, editor of Human Events magazine
- Brian Nash (1988): basketball coach who was an assistant coach at Bishop Ford from 1992 to 1993
- Marco Oppedisano (1989): guitarist and electroacoustic music composer
- Chaz Williams (1991): basketball player

== Filming location ==
The building was used as a filming location for several commercials and music videos.

- Rock band R.E.M.'s music video "All the Way to Reno (You're Gonna Be a Star)" was shot at Bishop Ford in 2001, directed by Michael Moore.
- Rapper Drake's debut music video "Best I Ever Had" was shot at Bishop Ford in June 2009.
- Record producer Mike WiLL Made It's debut music video "#23" was shot at Bishop Ford in August 2013. The music video features Mike WiLL Made It, singer Miley Cyrus, and rappers Wiz Khalifa and Juicy J.
- The school building appears in several early shots in the 1975 film Dog Day Afternoon, which was filmed nearby.

== Bishop Ford Educational Complex ==
The building now houses three public schools:

- K-280, a pre-K school drawing students from across School District 15
- Brooklyn Urban Garden School (BUGS), a middle school focused on environmental sustainability and education
- MS 442, a middle school with a successful program for children with Autism Spectrum Disorder
