= 1922–23 St. Francis Terriers men's basketball team =

American college basketball season

1922–23 St. Francis Terriers men's basketball

Eastern Catholic Champions
- Conference: Independent
- Record: 21–8
- Head coach: Frank Brennan (2nd season)

The 1922–23 St. Francis Terriers men's basketball team represented St. Francis College during the 1922–23 NCAA men's basketball season. The team was coached by Frank Brennan, who was in his second year at the helm of the St. Francis Terriers. The team was not part of a conference and played as division I independents.

The 1922–23 team finished with a .724 record at 21–8.

== Roster ==
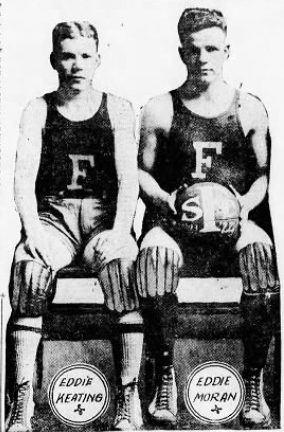
Photo of Eddie Keating and Eddie Moran, St. Francis College players on the 1922-23 basketball team.

1922–23 St. Francis Brooklyn Terriers men's basketball team
Players
Coaches

Pos.	#	Name	Height	Weight	Year	Hometown
F		Eddie Keating	5 ft 7 in (1.7 m)	143 lb (65 kg)
F		Edgar Moran	5 ft 7 in (1.7 m)	145 lb (66 kg)
C		Nip Lynch	—	—
G		James Twohy (C)	—	—	Sr
G		Leon Morgan	—	—
G		Jim Kenney	—	—
F		Jim Wallace	—	—
F		Joe Milde	—	—
G		Paul Pendergast	—	—

Head coach

- Frank Brennan

Assistant coach(es)

Legend

- (C) Team captain
- (S) Suspended
- (I) Ineligible
- (W) Walk-on
- Injured
- Current redshirt

== Season ==
James Twohy was the captain of the 1922–23 squad. He helped lead the Terriers to win the Eastern Catholic Collegiate regular season championship. On February 28, St. Francis played St. Joseph's for the Catholic Intercollegiate Championship of the East. The March 17th game against Harvard was the first time the two programs met.

== Schedule and results ==
Date time, TV	Opponent	Result	Record	Site city, state
Regular Season
November 15, 1922	at Cathedral College	W 31–16	1–0	Sacred Heart Lyceum; Bronx, NY
November 30, 1922	at Brooklyn Law	W 22–14	2–0	13th Regiment Armory; Brooklyn, NY
December 2, 1922	at City College	L 21–33	2–1	New York, NY
December 7, 1922	at Villanova	L 30–41	2–2	Villanova, PA
December 8, 1922	at Mount St. Mary's	W 17–16 ^{2OT}	3–2	Emmitsburg, MD
December 9, 1922	at Navy	L 34–49	3–3	Annapolis, MD
December 12, 1922	at Crescent Athletic Club	L 20–26	3–4	Brooklyn, NY
December 15, 1922	Cooper Union	W 39–31	4–4	13th Regiment Armory; Brooklyn, NY
December 22, 1922	New York Aggies	T 0–0	5–4	Knights of Columbus Hall; Brooklyn, NY
December 27, 1922	Holy Cross	W 26–14	6–4	Rink Sporting Club Auditorium; Brooklyn, NY
December 29, 1922	McGill	W 43–27	7–4	Rink Sporting Club Auditorium; Brooklyn, NY
January 3, 1923	Toronto	W 26–17	8–4	Rink Sporting Club Auditorium; Brooklyn, NY
January 10, 1923	Brooklyn College	W 45–15	9–4	Rink Sporting Club Auditorium; Brooklyn, NY
January 13, 1923	Cathedral College	W 33–15	10–4	13th Regiment Armory; Brooklyn, NY
January 17, 1923	Springfield YMCA	W	11–4	Rink Sporting Club Auditorium; Brooklyn, NY
January 22, 1923; 9:00 pm	at St. John's	L 23–24	11–5	Brooklyn, NY
January 24, 1923	at Army	L 14–35	11–6	West Point, NY
January 26, 1923	Muhlenberg	W 21–18	12–6	Rink Sporting Club Auditorium; Brooklyn, NY
January 27, 1923	at Cooper Union	W	13–6	New York, NY
January 29, 1923	at Massachusetts College of Pharmacy	W 57–26	14–6	Boston, MA
January 31, 1923	at Springfield YMCA	L 22–32	14–7	Springfield, MA
February 1, 1923	at Holy Cross	W 34–28	15–7	Worcester, MA
February 2, 1923	at St. Mary's	W	16–7	
February 10, 1923	at Brooklyn Poly	W 34–28	17–7	Brooklyn, NY
February 16, 1923	at Cooper Union	W 40–31	18–7	New York, NY
February 28, 1923	Saint Joseph's	W 31–24	19–7	Rink Sporting Club Auditorium; Brooklyn, NY
March 3, 1923	Cooper Union	W 49–21	20–7	Brooklyn, NY
March 7, 1923	St. John's	W 29–22	21–7	Rink Sporting Club Auditorium; Brooklyn, NY
March 16, 1923	at Harvard	L 23–35	21–8	Cambridge, MA
*Non-conference game. ^{#}Rankings from AP Poll. (#) Tournament seedings in parentheses. All times are in Eastern Time.
