= 1953–54 St. Francis Terriers men's basketball team =

American college basketball season

1953–54 St. Francis Terriers men's basketball

Metropolitan New York Conference Regular Season Champions

NIT Quarterfinals vs. Holy Cross, L 69–93
- Conference: Metropolitan New York Conference
- Record: 21–5 (5–0 MTNY)
- Head coach: Daniel Lynch (6th season)
- Home arena: Butler Street Gymnasium; II Corps Artillery Armory

1953–54 Metropolitan New York Conference men's basketball standings
	Conf.				Overall
Team	W		L	PCT	W		L	PCT
St. Francis (NY)	5	–	0	1.000	23	–	5	.821
Fordham	3	–	1	.750	18	–	6	.750
Manhattan	3	–	3	.500	15	–	11	.577
NYU	2	–	2	.500	9	–	9	.500
St. John's	2	–	3	.400	9	–	11	.450
CCNY	2	–	4	.333	10	–	8	.556
Brooklyn	0	–	4	.000	6	–	11	.353
Rankings from AP Poll

The 1953–1954 St. Francis Terriers men's basketball team represented St. Francis College during the 1953–54 NCAA Division I men's basketball season. The team was coached by Daniel Lynch, who was in his sixth year at the helm of the St. Francis Terriers. The team was a member of the Metropolitan New York Conference and played their home games at the Bulter Street Gymnasium in their Cobble Hill, Brooklyn campus and at the II Corps Artillery Armory in Park Slope, Brooklyn.

During the 1953–54 season the Terriers won their first regular season conference championship and participated in their first National Invitational Tournament reaching the Quarterfinals. Their participation in the NIT was more impressive considering they had the smallest student body of all schools ever selected and were the only school participating from the NYC area that year. The Terriers first-round victory over 20th ranked Louisville was considered a notable upset. The 1953–54 season also stands as the Terriers best record of all time.

== Roster ==
1953–54 St. Francis Brooklyn Terriers men's basketball team
Players
Coaches

Pos.	#	Name	Height	Weight	Year	Previous school	Hometown
C		Hank Daubenschmidt	6 ft 9 in (2.06 m)	—	Sr	Bronx, NY
F		Jack Walsh (C)	6 ft 4 in (1.93 m)	—	Sr
		George Searing	5 ft 11 in (1.8 m)	—	Sr
		Jerry McMurrer	6 ft 4 in (1.93 m)	—	Sr
G		Frank Dentico	5 ft 10 in (1.78 m)	—	Jr
G		Leo Keegan	5 ft 10 in (1.78 m)	—	Jr
		Elliott Press	6 ft 2 in (1.88 m)	—	Jr
		Ed Crofton	—	—	So
		Jack Fitzgerald	—	—	So
		Dan Mannix	—	—	So
F		Dan Smith	6 ft 3 in (1.91 m)	—	So
G		Jim Murphy	5 ft 11 in (1.8 m)	—	So
C		Walter Adamushko	6 ft 6 in (1.98 m)	245 lb (111 kg)	Fr	Thomas Jefferson High School	Brooklyn, NY

Head coach

- Daniel Lynch (St. Francis '38)

Assistant coach(es)

Legend

- (C) Team captain
- (S) Suspended
- (I) Ineligible
- (W) Walk-on
- Injured
- Current redshirt

== Schedule ==
Date time, TV	Opponent	Result	Record	Site city, state
Exhibition
November 21, 1953*	Alumni	W 60–55	1–0	Butler Street Gymnasium; Brooklyn, NY
November 23, 1953*	Fort Monmouth	W 83–60	2–0	Butler Street Gymnasium; Brooklyn, NY
November 25, 1953*	Equitable Life	W 68–57	3–0	II Corps Armory; Brooklyn, NY
Regular Season
November 28, 1953*	vs. Pace	W 81–61	1–0	
December 2, 1953*	Loyola (Baltimore)	W 74–58	2–0	II Corps Armory (1,500); Brooklyn, NY
December 5, 1953*	Mount St. Mary's	W 74–54	3–0	II Corps Armory; Brooklyn, NY
December 12, 1953*	Providence	W 85–63	4–0	II Corps Armory (2,200); Brooklyn, NY
December 17, 1953*; 7:45 pm	vs. No. 7 Western Kentucky	L 55–78	4–1	Madison Square Garden; New York, NY
December 19, 1953*	at Seton Hall	L 65–86	4–2	Walsh Gymnasium; South Orange, NJ
December 31, 1953*	vs. South Carolina; All-American City Basketball Tournament First Round	W 58–55	5–2	Owensboro Sports Center; Owensboro, KY
January 1, 1954*	at Kentucky Wesleyan; All-American City Basketball Tournament Second Round	L 69–71	5–3	Owensboro Sports Center; Owensboro, KY
January 2, 1954*	vs. Evansville; All-American City Basketball Tournament 3rd Place Game	W 84–76	6–3	Owensboro Sports Center; Owensboro, KY
January 6, 1954	Fordham	W 53–49	7–3 (1–0)	II Corps Armory (3,000); Brooklyn, NY
January 9, 1954*	Panzer College	W 89–76	8–3	Butler Street Gymnasium; Brooklyn, NY
January 13, 1954*	Saint Peter's	W 85–66	9–3	II Corps Armory; Brooklyn, NY
January 15, 1954*	at Villanova	W 72–62	10–3	Villanova Field House; Villanova, PA
January 23, 1954*	Georgetown	W 77–52	11–3	II Corps Armory; Brooklyn, NY
January 28, 1954	at St. John's	W 67–48	12–3 (2–0)	DeGray Gymnasium; Brooklyn, NY
February 3, 1954*	Siena	W 51–47	13–3	II Corps Armory; Brooklyn, NY
February 6, 1954*	Adelphi	W 70–59	14–3	II Corps Armory; Brooklyn, NY
February 10, 1954*	Temple	W 71–62	15–3	II Corps Armory; Brooklyn, NY
February 13, 1954*	at Queens College	W 75–74	16–3	Fitzgerald Gymnasium; Flushing, NY
February 17, 1954	CCNY	W 71–51	17–3 (3–0)	II Corps Armory (2,500); Brooklyn, NY
February 22, 1954	at Brooklyn College	W 82–49	18–3 (4–0)	Roosevelt Gymnasium; Brooklyn, NY
February 25, 1954*; 7:45 pm	vs. Iona	W 69–61	19–3	Madison Square Garden (4,876); New York, NY
February 27, 1954	Manhattan	W 84–72	20–3 (5–0)	II Corps Armory; Brooklyn, NY
March 3, 1954*	at Siena	L 60–67	20–4	Albany Armory (3,000); Albany, NY
National Invitation Tournament
March 6, 1954*	vs. No. 20 Louisville; First Round	W 60–55	21–4	Madison Square Garden (16,259); New York, NY
March 9, 1954*	vs. No. 9 Holy Cross; Quarterfinals	L 69–93	21–5	Madison Square Garden; New York, NY
*Non-conference game. ^{#}Rankings from AP Poll. (#) Tournament seedings in parentheses. All times are in Eastern Time.

== NBA draft ==
At the end of the season Henry Daubenschmidt was drafted by the Boston Celtics with the 23rd overall pick.

== Awards ==
- Henry Daubenschmidt

All-Metropolitan player by the Metropolitan Basketball Writers’ Association
