= Gene Roberti =

American college basketball and baseball coach (1930–2020)

Biographical details
- Born: May 1, 1930
- Died: February 8, 2020 (aged 89)

Coaching career (HC unless noted)

Men's basketball
- 1967–1973: Iona (assistant)
- 1973–1975: Iona
- 1979–1984: St. Francis (NY)

Baseball
- 1968–1979: Iona

Head coaching record
- Overall: 58–124 (.319) (basketball)

Eugene J. Roberti (May 1, 1930 – February 8, 2020) was an American baseball and basketball coach who was the head men's basketball coach at Iona College and St. Francis College and the head baseball coach at Iona.

== Biography ==
Roberti attended Iona College and was captain of the 1952–53 Iona basketball team. After graduating, he worked as an accountant. In 1967, he returned to Iona as head baseball and assistant basketball coach. In 1971, he was elected president of the Metropolitan College Baseball Conference. In 1973, he was promoted to head coach following the retirement of Jim McDermott. He led Iona to a 15–32 record over two seasons. He was removed as basketball coach after the 1974–75 season and replaced by Jim Valvano. He remained with the school as baseball coach and assistant athletic director.

In 1979, Roberti left Iona to become the head basketball coach at St. Francis. Over five seasons, he compiled a 43–92 record and did not have a winning season. He resigned after a 2–26 1983–84 season that saw St. Francis lose a school record 17-straight games. He was replaced by Bob Valvano, brother of Jim Valvano.
