= George Hinchcliffe =

American basketball player and coach (1908–1966)

Biographical details
- Born: October 15, 1908
- Died: June 30, 1966 (aged 57)

Playing career

Basketball
- 1925–1928: Manhattan
- 1928–1930: St. John's
- 1930–1932: Yonkers Caseys
- 1932–1933: Yonkers Knights
- 1933–1935: Yonkers Caseys

Coaching career (HC unless noted)
- 1930–1932: St. Francis (NY)

Head coaching record
- Overall: 26–29 (.473)

George William Hinchcliffe (October 15, 1908 – June 30, 1966) was an American basketball player and coach.

Hinchcliffe played baseball and basketball at Manhattan College and St. John's College. After graduating, he played for the Yonkers Caseys, an independent basketball team based in his hometown of Yonkers, New York. During the 1932–33 season, he was a member of the Yonkers Knights of the Metropolitan Basketball League. From 1930 to 1932, he was the head basketball coach at St. Francis College, where he amassed a 26–29 record.
