= Ron Ganulin =

American basketball coach (born 1945)

Current position
- Title: Assistant coach
- Team: St. Francis Brooklyn
- Conference: NEC

Biographical details
- Born: May 15, 1945 (age 81)

Playing career
- 1963–1967: LIU Brooklyn

Coaching career (HC unless noted)
- 1976–1978: C. W. Post (assistant)
- 1978–1980: NYIT (assistant)
- 1980–1982: NYIT
- 1982–1985: Saint Peter's (assistant)
- 1985–1987: Old Dominion (assistant)
- 1987–1991: UNLV (assistant)
- 1991–2005: St. Francis (NY)
- 2006–2008: Manhattan (assistant)
- 2011–2012: YUHSB (assistant)
- 2013–present: St. Francis Brooklyn (assistant)

Head coaching record
- Overall: 214–230

Accomplishments and honors

Championships
- 2 NEC (2001, 2005)

Awards
- 2× NEC Coach of the Year (1998, 2004)

Ron Ganulin (born May 15, 1945) is an American basketball coach. He is an assistant men's basketball coach at St. Francis College in Brooklyn, New York. Ganulin served as the head men's basketball coach at New York Institute of Technology from 1980 to 1982 and at St. Francis from 1991 to 2005.

== Biography ==
Before he began his coaching career, Ganulin played collegiate basketball at Long Island University, where he graduated with a Bachelor of Science degree in 1968. During his senior season, LIU advanced to the Division II National Collegiate Semifinals.

Prior to his tenure at St. Francis, Ganulin reached the pinnacle of the college basketball world as an assistant coach with UNLV. Ganulin helped the team capture the 1990 NCAA National Championship. During his four-year stay in Las Vegas, the Rebels enjoyed a 126–23 record.

After St. Francis College, Ganulin served as the coordinator of player development for the Wizards during the 2005–06 season.

Coach Ganulin also coached the boys junior varsity, as head coach, and assistant coach for varsity basketball, at the Yeshiva University High School for Boys in Uptown NYC.

== St. Francis College ==
Ganulin was the head coach of St. Francis Terriers for 14 seasons, from 1991 to 2005. As head coach, Ganulin accumulated 187 wins and was twice named the Northeast Conference's Coach of the Year. During Ganulin's tenure, St. Francis finished with a .500 or better record in the league eight straight years, at that time the longest active streak in the NEC. The Terriers reached the NEC semifinals five times and had two championship game appearances. From 1998 through 2004, St. Francis posted a 78–36 conference record, which was best in the NEC. During that span, Ganulin guided the Terriers to two Northeast Conference Regular Season Championships as well as their first 20 win season in 43 years.

In 2013, Ganulin returned to St. Francis to be an assistant coach under Glenn Braica, who was his assistant during his head coaching tenure at St. Francis.

== Head coaching record ==
Record table
Season	Team	Overall	Conference	Standing	Postseason
NYIT Bears (East Coast Conference) (1980–1982)
1980–81	NYIT	14–12			
1981–82	NYIT	13–11			
NYIT:		27–23			
St. Francis Terriers (Northeast Conference) (1991–2005)
1991–92	St. Francis	15–14	8–8	4th	
1992–93	St. Francis	9–18	8–10	6th	
1993–94	St. Francis	1–26	1–17	10th	
1994–95	St. Francis	9–18	5–13	9th	
1995–96	St. Francis	9–18	3–15	9th	
1996–97	St. Francis	13–15	7–11	7th	
1997–98	St. Francis	15–12	10–6	3rd	
1998–99	St. Francis	20–8	16–4	2nd	
1999–00	St. Francis	18–12	12–6	4th	
2000–01	St. Francis	18–11	16–4	1st	
2001–02	St. Francis	18–11	13–7	5th	
2002–03	St. Francis	14–16	9–9	6th	
2003–04	St. Francis	15–13	12–6	T–1st	
2004–05	St. Francis	13–14	9–9	7th	
St. Francis:		187–207	129–125		
Total:		214–230			
National champion Postseason invitational champion Conference regular season champion Conference regular season and conference tournament champion Division regular season champion Division regular season and conference tournament champion Conference tournament champion
