= 1954 National Invitation Tournament =

Annual NCAA basketball competition

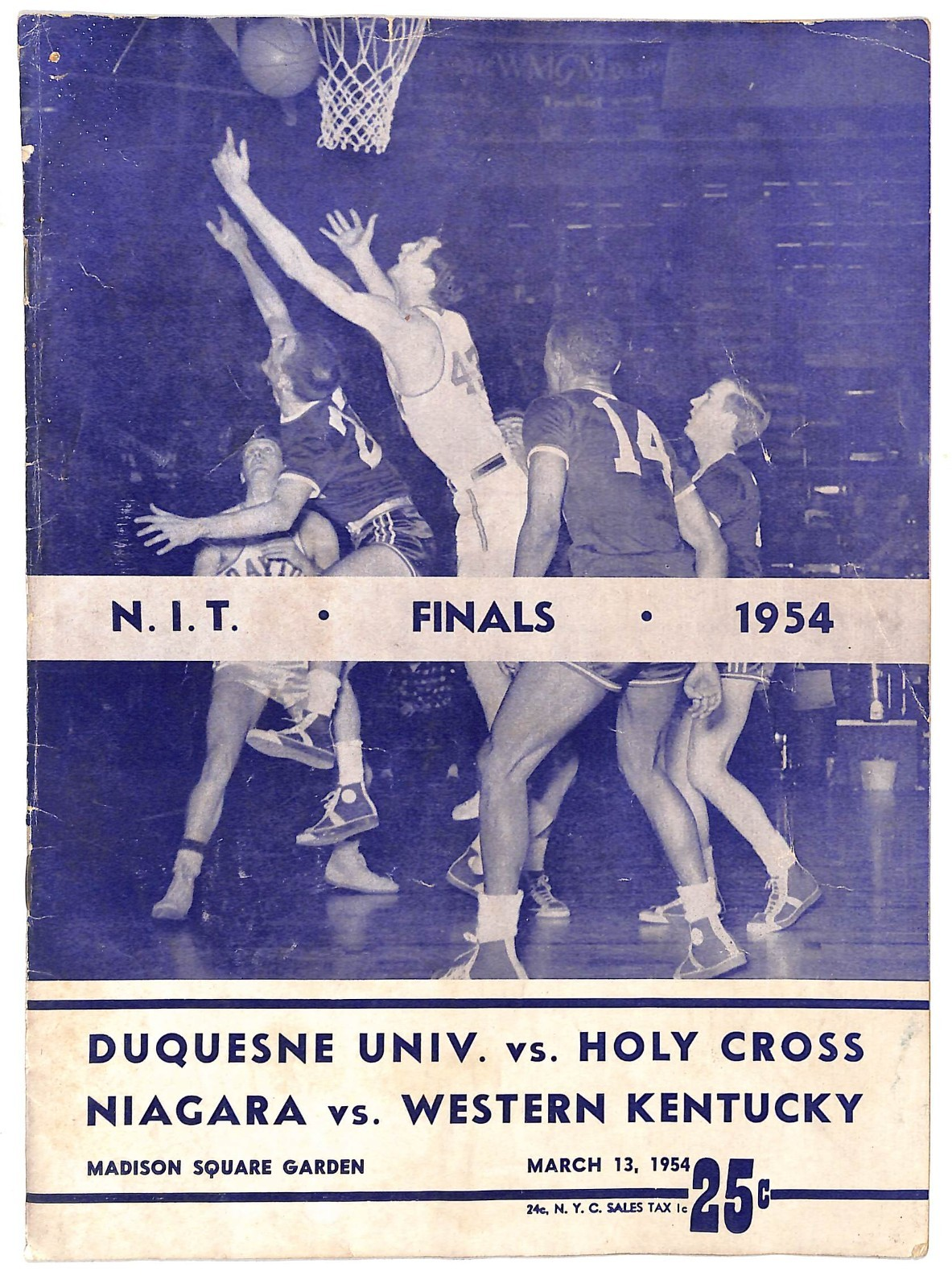
- Season: 1953–54
- Teams: 12
- Finals site: Madison Square Garden, New York City
- Champions: Holy Cross Crusaders (1st title)
- Runner-up: Duquesne Dukes (2nd title game)
- Semifinalists: Niagara Purple Eagles (1st semifinal); Western Kentucky Hilltoppers (3rd semifinal)
- Winning coach: Lester Sheary (1st title)
- MVP: Togo Palazzi (Holy Cross)

The 1954 National Invitation Tournament was the 1954 edition of the annual NCAA college basketball competition.

== Selected teams ==
Below is a list of the 12 teams selected for the tournament. There were 4 seeded teams, which received a bye in the first round, (1) Duquesne, (2) Western Kentucky, (3) Holy Cross, and (4) Niagara.

Participants	Seed
Duquesne	1
Western Kentucky State	2
Holy Cross	3
Niagara	4
Bowling Green	
BYU	
Dayton	
Louisville	
Manhattan	
St. Francis (NY)	
Saint Francis (PA)	
Wichita State	

== Bracket ==
Below is the tournament bracket.

First round
Bowling Green	88
Wichita State	64
St. Francis (NY)	60
Louisville	55
Saint Francis (PA)	81
BYU	68
Dayton	90
Manhattan	79

Quarterfinals
Bowling Green	81
2	Western Kentucky	95
3	Holy Cross	93
St. Francis (NY)	69
Saint Francis (PA)	63
1	Duquesne	69
4	Niagara	77
Dayton	74

Semifinals
2	Western Kentucky	69
3	Holy Cross	75
1	Duquesne	66
4	Niagara	51

Finals
3	Holy Cross	71
1	Duquesne	62

Third place game
2	Western Kentucky	66
4	Niagara	71

== See also ==
- 1954 NCAA basketball tournament
- 1954 NAIA Basketball Tournament
