= 1956 National Invitation Tournament =

Annual NCAA basketball competition

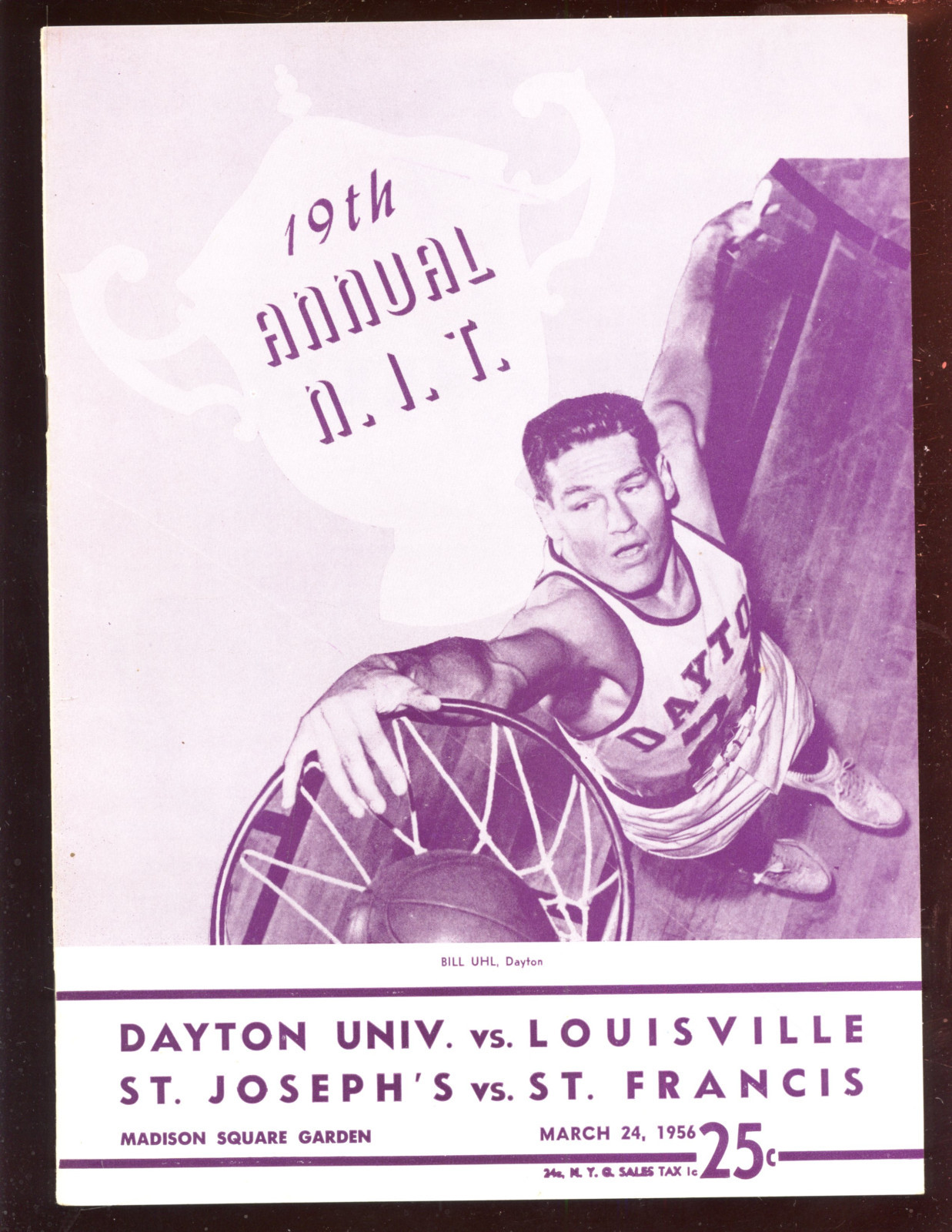
- Season: 1955–56
- Teams: 12
- Finals site: Madison Square Garden, New York City
- Champions: Louisville Cardinals (1st title)
- Runner-up: Dayton Flyers (4th title game)
- Semifinalists: Saint Joseph's Hawks (1st semifinal); St. Francis (NY) Terriers (1st semifinal)
- Winning coach: Bernard Hickman (1st title)
- MVP: Charlie Tyra (Louisville)

The 1956 National Invitation Tournament was the 1956 edition of the annual NCAA college basketball competition.

== Selected teams ==
Below is a list of the 12 teams selected for the tournament. The top four teams are seeded and receive a bye for the first round.

Participants	Seed
Dayton	1
Louisville	2
Saint Joseph's	3
Niagara	4
Duquesne	
Lafayette	
Marquette	
Oklahoma A&M	
St. Francis (NY)	
Saint Louis	
Seton Hall	
Xavier	

== Bracket ==
Below is the tournament bracket.

First round
Duquesne	69
Oklahoma A&M	61
Seton Hall	96
Marquette	78
St. Francis (NY)	85
Lafayette	74
Xavier	84
Saint Louis	80

Quarterfinals
Duquesne	72
2	Louisville	84
3	Saint Joseph's	74
Seton Hall	65
St. Francis (NY)	74
4	Niagara	72
1	Dayton	72
Xavier	68

Semifinals
2	Louisville	89
3	Saint Joseph's	79
St. Francis (NY)	58
1	Dayton	89

Finals
2	Louisville	93
1	Dayton	80

Third place game
3	Saint Joseph's	93
	St. Francis (NY)	82

== See also ==
- 1956 NCAA basketball tournament
- 1956 NAIA Basketball Tournament
