= Brian Nash (basketball) =

American basketball coach (born 1970)

Biographical details
- Born: June 22, 1970 (age 56)

Playing career
- 1988–1992: Keene State

Coaching career (HC unless noted)
- 1992–1993: Bishop Ford HS (assistant)
- 1993–1994: Sacred Heart (assistant)
- 1994–2000: St. Bonaventure (assistant)
- 2000–2001: Siena (assistant)
- 2001–2005: Seton Hall (assistant)
- 2005–2010: St. Francis (NY)
- 2011–2012: Fairfield (assistant)
- 2012–2016: Duquesne (assistant)
- 2016–present: IMG Academy (Director)

Head coaching record
- Overall: 47–99

Brian Nash (born June 22, 1970) is an American basketball coach. He is currently the Senior Vice President of Athletics at IMG Academy in Bradenton, Florida after having served as the Director of Basketball from 2016 to 2024. Nash served as the head men's basketball coach at Saint Francis College in Brooklyn, New York from 2005 to 2010. He resigned this position on April 7, 2010 citing personal reasons.

== Head coaching record ==
Record table
| Season | Team | Overall | Conference | Standing | Postseason |
|---|---|---|---|---|---|
St. Francis Terriers (Northeast Conference) (2005–2010)
| 2005–06 | St. Francis | 10–17 | 7–11 | T–8th | |
| 2006–07 | St. Francis | 9–22 | 7–11 | T–6th | |
| 2007–08 | St. Francis | 7–22 | 4–14 | T–8th | |
| 2008–09 | St. Francis | 10–20 | 7–11 | 8th | |
| 2009–10 | St. Francis | 11–18 | 8–10 | T–8th | |
| St. Francis: | | 47–99 | 33–58 | | |
| Total: | | 47–99 | | | |
