= John M. Prenderville =

American athlete and government official (1933–2019)

Biographical details
- Born: August 5, 1933
- Died: October 26, 2019 (aged 86); Troy, New York, U.S.
- Education: St. Francis College

Playing career

Basketball
- 1950–1953 1955–1956: St. Francis (NY); St. Francis (NY)

Coaching career (HC unless noted)
- 1963–1973 1973–1975: St. Francis Prep (NY); St. Francis (NY)

Administrative career (AD unless noted)
- 1974–1994 1978–1983: NYS OPRHP (Dep. Com.); NYSAC (Chair)

Head coaching record
- Overall: 18–32 (NCAA)

John M. Prenderville (August 5, 1933 – October 26, 2019) was an American athlete and government official who played and coached basketball at St. Francis Preparatory School and St. Francis College and served as chairman of the New York State Athletic Commission and deputy commissioner of the New York State Office of Parks, Recreation and Historic Preservation.

== Athletic career ==
Prenderville grew up in Park Slope and played basketball St. Francis Preparatory School and St. Francis College. His playing career was interrupted by the Korean War. He served in the United States Army from 1953 to 1955. He was a member of the St. Francis team that made it to the semifinals of the 1956 National Invitation Tournament. He graduated from St. Francis College in 1956.

== Coaching career ==
From 1963 to 1973, Prenderville was the varsity and junior varsity basketball coach at St. Francis Prep. In 1973 he succeeded his former teammate Lester Yellin as the head coach at St. Francis College. In two seasons he compiled a record of 18–32.

=== Head coaching record ===
Record table
Season	Team	Overall	Conference	Standing	Postseason
St. Francis Terriers (NCAA Division I independent) (1973–1975)
1973–74	St. Francis	11–13			
1974–75	St. Francis	7–19			
Total:		18–32			
National champion Postseason invitational champion Conference regular season champion Conference regular season and conference tournament champion Division regular season champion Division regular season and conference tournament champion Conference tournament champion

== Government service ==
Prenderville began his career in politics as an assistant to Congressman Hugh L. Carey. Prenderville later ran Carey's Brooklyn office and when Carey became Governor of New York, Prenderville was appointed deputy commissioner of the New York State Office of Parks, Recreation and Historic Preservation. In 1977, Prenderville helped create the Empire State Games. In February 1978 he was named acting chairman of the New York State Athletic Commission. He was promoted to permanent chairman that July. He was replaced by John R. Branca as athletic commission chairman in 1983 but continued to serve as Deputy Commissioner of Parks and Recreation until 1994.

== Later life ==
Prenderville served as president of the American Housing Foundation, which provided affordable rental apartments for the elderly in the Capital Region. He died on October 26, 2019, in Samaritan Hospital in Troy, New York.
