= St. Francis Brooklyn Terriers men's basketball =

American college basketball team

St. Francis Brooklyn Terriers
- University: St. Francis College
- Location: Brooklyn, New York
- Arena: Generoso Pope Athletic Complex, Remsen St campus (1971-2022) The ARC, Pratt Institute (2022-2023)
- Nickname: Terriers
- Colors: Royal blue and red
- All-time record: 1236–1296 (.488)

Conference regular-season champions
- MTNY: 1954, 1956; MCC: 1967, NEC: 2001, 2004, 2015

Uniforms
Home	Away	Alternate

The St. Francis Brooklyn Terriers men's basketball program represented St. Francis College (SFC) in intercollegiate men's basketball up through the 2022–23 season, which was its last in intercollegiate competition. The team was a member of the Division I Northeast Conference. From 1971 through the 2021–22 season, they had played in the Daniel J. Lynch '38 Gym in the Generoso Pope Athletic Complex, located on SFC's former Brooklyn Heights campus. However, after the 2021–22 school year, SFC closed its Brooklyn Heights campus to move to a new campus on Livingston Street in Downtown Brooklyn. With the new campus lacking any athletic facilities, SFC arranged to use other nearby venues on at least a short-term basis. The Terriers' final game at the Pope Athletic Complex was held on November 19, 2022. From late November 2022 until March 2023, the Terriers played home games at the Activity Resource Center (branded as "The ARC") at Pratt Institute in the Clinton Hill neighborhood of Brooklyn. The Terriers have also hosted home games at Madison Square Garden and at the Barclays Center. On March 20, 2023, St. Francis College announced that it would end intercollegiate athletics following the spring semester, making the 2022–23 season the program's final season in existence.

The St. Francis Brooklyn men's basketball program was founded in 1896 and was the oldest collegiate program in New York City. The Terriers have an overall record of 1223–1295, 48.6 W–L%, over a 99-year span from the 1920–1921 to the 2019–2020 season. The program has won 6 regular season championships and has participated in 4 National Invitational Tournaments. In 2010, Glenn Braica was announced as the 17th head coach in the history of the St. Francis Terriers men's basketball program. Braica was previously an assistant under Norm Roberts at St. John's University. Braica has qualified nine times for the NEC tournament and in 2015 led the team to its first post season tournament in 52 years. Braica coached the team until the Terriers final season in 2022–23.

The Terriers were one of seven NCAA Division I programs in New York City and in 2011 attending a Terriers game was named one reason to love New York by New York Magazine in their seventh annual Reasons to Love New York 2011 piece. The Terriers are also one of only four original Division I programs (since 1939) to have never participated in the NCAA tournament. The Terriers have been one win away from participating on three occasions, first in the 2000–01 season, then in the 2002–03 season, and again in the 2014–15 season. Beginning on November 27, 2012, St. Francis College rebranded its Athletics programs from St. Francis (NY) to St. Francis Brooklyn. After the 2022–23 season, St. Francis Brooklyn dropped all intercollegiate athletics, including basketball, from the college after over 120 years of history.

== History ==
=== Early years (1896–1940) ===
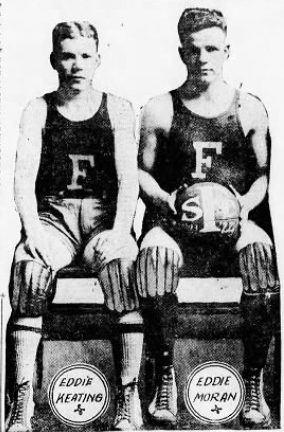
Photo of Eddie Keating and Eddie Moran, St. Francis College players on the 1922–23 basketball team.

The St. Francis College's men's basketball program was founded in 1896 and was the oldest collegiate program in New York City. The program had players on the court only 5 years after Dr. James Naismith invented the game in 1891. The College's first official game came in 1901 against Brown University. The Boys from Brooklyn, as they were referred to, finished the 1901 season with a 13–1 mark. From the 1902 to the 1920 season the Terrier basketball records are incomplete. Then from 1920 to 1940 the Terriers compiled a 246–187 record and established themselves as a premier basketball program in New York City, playing their home games in Brooklyn. The Terriers had played as Independents for most of these years, but in 1933 they were a founding member of the now defunct Metropolitan New York Conference. During this time period the Terriers hosted their home games in their gymnasium at the Butler Street Campus in Cobble Hill, Brooklyn or at the 13th Regiment Armory.

The Terriers had 6 head coaches during this period, the most successful of which was Rody Cooney. Who in his 9 years at the helm of the program didn't have a single losing season and compiled a 116–77 record. During this period the Terriers also had their first 20-win season. Cooney's 1935-36 team was the first to participate in a post-season tournament. The Terriers were invited to play in the District 1 tryouts at Madison Square Garden for the 1936 Summer Olympics.

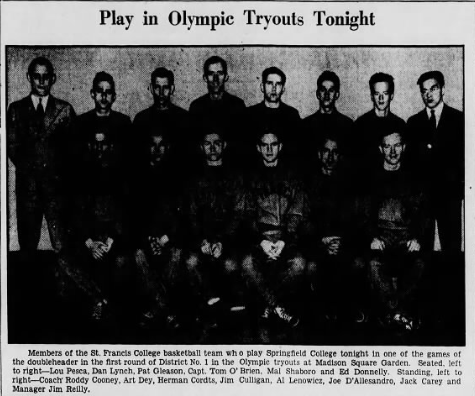
Photo of the 1936 St. Francis Terriers Basketball Team, which was selected to tryout for the 1936 Summer Olympics.

=== Golden years (1941–1968) ===
==== Joseph Brennan era (1941–47) ====
Joseph Brennan was the Terriers head coach with the highest winning percentage and he was also elected to the Naismith Memorial Basketball Hall of Fame in 1975. Brennan helped make the Terriers into a popular team during New York City's Basketball glory days of the 1940s and 50s. Due to their popularity the Terriers would play 2 to 3 games a year at Madison Square Garden and the Terriers were one of the few programs hosting Division I games in Brooklyn at the Park Slope Armory, their home court. Brennan's 1941-42 squad averaged 56 points per game, which was quite high during those years. The Terriers also had the first college player to score 20 or more points at Madison Square Garden, Vincent T. Agoglia. He did it twice in the 1941–1942 season, first against LaSalle College of Philadelphia. Brennan ended his head coaching career with a 90–46 (66.2%) record over 7 seasons.

==== Daniel Lynch era (1948–1968) ====
The greatest head coach in the program's history was Daniel Lynch. Lynch was a graduate of St. Francis College and played basketball at his alma mater from 1934–38 under head coach Rody Cooney. When Lynch took over in 1948 the Terriers became the first team in the New York City area to have a game televised. The Terriers defeated Seton Hall in its inaugural telecast on WPIX. Lynch is the Terrier head coach with the most wins in the programs history (283). Part of that wins total came during a 6-year span from 1950 to 1956, where Lynch guided the Terriers to five consecutive winning seasons going 121–43. As a tribute, the Terriers home court is in the Daniel Lynch Gymnasium, which is part of the Generoso Pope Athletic Complex.

From 1949–1951 the Terriers participated in 4 National Catholic Invitational Tournaments (NCIT). The NCIT was a premier post-season tournament in those years. The Terriers went to the NCIT finals three consecutive times and won the Championship in 1951. Lynch's 1950–51 squad defeated the Seattle University Redhawks 93–79 in the Championship game. Ray Rudzinski scored 26 points, Vernon Stokes scored 22 and Roy Reardon scored 21 points in the NCIT Championship that took place in Albany, New York.

The Terriers appeared in the 1955 NAIA Division I men's basketball tournament, losing in the first round to Quincy University. St. Francis first participated in the NAIA District 31 playoffs to qualify for the tournament, in it they defeated St. Peter's (63–55) and Panzer College (80–70). Their record in the tournament is 0–1 and have only made one appearance in their history.

Lynch also led the Terriers to 3 NIT appearances (1954, 1956, and 1963). Lynch's 1953–54 squad won the Metropolitan New York Conference regular season championship and were invited to the 1954 NIT where they defeated Louisville in the first round before losing to Holy Cross in the Quarterfinals. The 1955–56 squad also won the Metropolitan New York Conference regular season championship and participated in the 1956 NIT. They went as far as the 3rd-place game where they lost to St. Joseph's to finish in fourth place. The 1955–1956 season was the Terriers best, as Coach Lynch led them to a 21–4 record that ranked them at 13th nationally in the AP polls. The squad included legends Al Innis, Dan Mannix, Walt Adamushko, and Tony D'Elia. The team at one point won 18 straight games and upset Niagara to reach the NIT Semi-Finals, before falling to Dayton. In the 1963 National Invitation Tournament the Terriers were one of 12 teams selected for the tournament. Lynch's team was the 4th best defense in the country and faced the best offense in Miami. St. Francis had the bigger Miami on the ropes with a 66–65 lead with 3:38 to play, led by Jim Raftery who scored 23 points. Yet the Terriers went on to lose 71–70 to Miami which featured future NBA all-star Rick Barry.

After the Metropolitan New York Conference became defunct in 1963, the Terriers became Independents before joining the Metropolitan Collegiate Conference. The Terriers were a part of the MCC for all four years in which it was active, winning the 1966–67 Conference regular season championship after going 7–2 in conference play. Lynch ended his coaching career with a 283-237 (54.4%) record over a 21-year span. After retiring as the head coach, Lynch became the full-time Athletic Director at St. Francis College, a post he held while he was head coach for several years.

===== Home court =====
The Terriers originally played most of their home games in their gymnasium at their Butler Street Campus, this lasted until 1955. The Terriers were also occasionally invited to play at Madison Square Garden III by Ned Irish, a basketball promoter. Yet, beginning in the late 1940s the Terriers would also host games at the 14th Regiment Armory in Park Slope, Brooklyn. Starting in the 1950-51 season, St. Francis College was banned from the Garden by Ned Irish for scheduling marquee games at the Park Slope Armory.

By 1956, the Terriers were exclusively hosting games at the Park Slope Armory since the College was in the process of moving its campus from Butler Street to the current Remsen Street location in Brooklyn Heights. The Terriers practices were often interrupted by military drills, and in 1960 the Terriers decided to relocate to the 69th Regiment Armory in Manhattan. The 69th Regiment Armory also provided a larger venue for the Terriers. Occasionally their games could not be played there, again because of military drills, as an alternate the Terriers would host games at Bishop Ford High School in Brooklyn. By 1968, the plans for a new gymnasium of their own at the Remsen Street Campus was in progress. Daniel Lynch was a large proponent of the Terriers having their own basketball court, and by 1971 the Terriers finally had their own gymnasium. The building is referred to as the Generoso Pope Athletic Complex and the basketball gym is named after Daniel Lynch.

With SFC noticeably expanding its enrollment in the early 2020s, it outgrew its Remsen Street campus, and moved to a new campus on Livingston Street in Downtown Brooklyn after the 2021–22 school year. The new campus lacks athletic facilities, forcing SFC to move basketball elsewhere. For the immediate future, the Terriers will play at The ARC at Pratt Institute, about 2 miles (3 km) from SFC's new campus in Brooklyn's Clinton Hill neighborhood.

=== Dark years (1969–90) ===
From the 1969–70 season to the 1990–91 season, a span of 22 years, the St. Francis Terriers men's basketball program only had three winning seasons. Two of those came during the tenure of Lou Rossini, who was formerly a head coach for NYU and Columbia. In the third year of his contract with St. Francis College, it was announced that they would not renew his contract. His team's performance on the court was not the reason and it is believed that differences arose because of the subpar academic performance of the student-athletes.

During those 22 years the Terriers went through six head coaches and hit a program low in the 1983–84 season going 2–26 under the tenure of Gene Roberti (1979–84). Bob Valvano (1984-88) took over as the youngest Division I coach in the country at 27 years old, and while the program made slight improvements, winning a conference tournament game for the first time in 1988, there were still no winning seasons. After Valvano, Rich Zvosec took the reins of the Terriers in 1988 and became the youngest Division I coach in the country at age 27. Zvosec produced a winning season 3 years into his tenure going 15–14. The winning season was only the 3rd in 22 years and the first in 11 seasons since Rossini accomplished the feat in 1978–79. Because of this feat, Zvosec was awarded the 1991 NEC Coach of the Year award.

Also during this time St. Francis College moved its campus and in 1971 the Terriers settled into a new home at the Pope Physical Education Center. Other transitions during this time included St. Francis joining a new conference in 1981, the Northeast Conference (then known as the ECAC Metro Conference). From 1968 until 1980, the Terriers played as Division I independents eventually becoming founding members of the Northeast Conference in 1981.

=== Ron Ganulin era (1991–04) ===
Ron Ganulin's 14 seasons were one of contrasts, but Ganulin helped restore the program to its glory days somewhat. Before joining the Terriers, Ganulin was fresh off the 1990 National Championship as an assistant with the 1989–90 UNLV Runnin' Rebels basketball team. Ganulin's tenure began with several losing seasons, his 1993–94 squad went 1–26 and finished last in the Northeast Conference. Yet by the 1997–98 season Ganulin's squad's began to turn it around stringing together 5 consecutive winning seasons from 1997–2001. Ganulin's 1998–99 team won 20 games, the first time in 43 years that the Terriers had accomplished the feat.

Ganulin accumulated 187 wins and was twice named the Northeast Conference's Coach of the Year. Ganulin's tenure at St. Francis include finishing with a .500 or better record in the Northeast Conference eight straight years, at that time the longest active streak in the conference and making the NEC Tournament each of his 14 seasons as head coach. They also reached the NEC semi-finals five times and had two NEC tournament championship game appearances (2001 and 2003). Those Championship game appearances are the closest the Terriers have been to making the NCAA tournament. From 1998 through 2004, St. Francis posted a 78–36 conference record, which was best in the NEC. During that span, Ganulin guided the Terriers to two Northeast Conference regular season championships.

Also during Ganulin's tenure St. Francis made their first appearance in a National Tournament since 1963, by being selected to participate in the 2003 NIT Season Tip-Off. The Terriers lost in the first round to Massachusetts. The 2003 NIT Tip-off invitation was a product of the Terriers success in the late 1990s and early 2000s. Yet Ganulin's accomplishments did not save him from being fired at the end of the 2004–05 season, after posting a 13–15 record.

=== Brian Nash era (2005–09) ===
Brian Nash was head coach for 5 seasons, during which time the Terriers lost much of the momentum gained during Ganulin's tenure. Nash's squad's never produced a winning season and missed the NEC Tournament three times in five seasons. Nash compiled a 47–99 record before resigning in 2009.

=== Glenn Braica era (2010–2023) ===
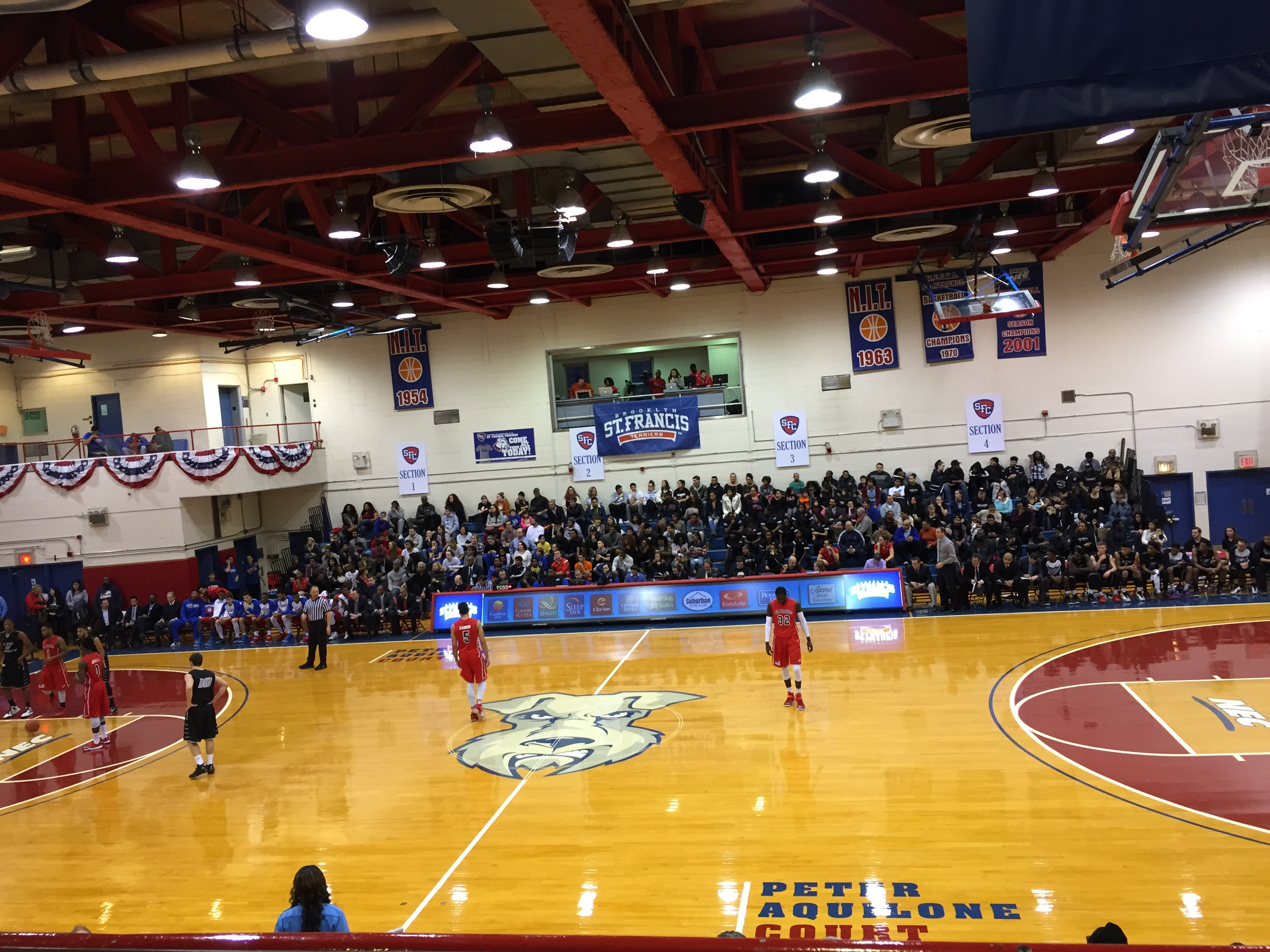
St. Francis vs LIU in the annual Battle of Brooklyn at The Pope on January 31, 2015.

On April 29, 2010, Glenn Braica was announced as the 17th head coach in the history of the St. Francis Terriers men's basketball program. Braica was a former assistant at St. Francis under Ron Ganulin for 15 years and was an assistant at St. John's under Norm Roberts for another 6 years. Braica inherited a depleted team that had not had a winning season in six years and quickly added 5 signings in his first year. This led to a 15–15 record and a berth in the NEC Tournament where they lost in the first round to Central Connecticut 62–64. In his second season, Braica led the Terriers to their second NEC tournament with the 4th seed. They went 15–15 overall and 12–6 in the NEC, their most conference wins since the 2003–04 season and they hosted their first home tournament game since 1997, a 72–80 loss to Quinnipiac. Additionally, Braica was selected as the 2012 NEC Jim Phelan coach of the year and as the 2012 NABC District 18 Co-Coach of the Year. After two 15–15 seasons, the Terriers posted their first losing record at 12–18 overall and 8–10 in conference play. St. Francis Brooklyn still qualified for the NEC tournament with the 8th seed and lost to first seed Robert Morris at the Sewall Center 57–75 in the opening round.

Prior to the 2013 season, Braica announced that he hired former head coach Ron Ganulin as an assistant. This would be their second stint together, but with Briaca at the helm this time. In 2013, the Terriers were selected to participate in the Maui Invitational Tournament as part of the Mainland Bracket for the first time in the programs history. Braica was able to guide his Terriers to a 9–6 non-conference record which was one win shy of being the first NEC team to win 10 non-conference games in a season. Part of this success was the Terriers stingy defense and big road wins against Miami, Florida Atlantic and Stony Brook. The Terriers ended the 2013–14 season at 18–14, their first time winning 18 games since the 2001–02 season. The Terriers qualified for the NEC Tournament with the 4th seed and lost to Mount St. Mary's in the opening round.

The 2014–15 Terriers for the first time as members of the NEC, were selected as the preseason NEC favorites by league head coaches. The program was also selected to participate in the 3rd annual 2014 Barclays Center Classic. On January 31, 2015, the Terriers gained sole possession of 1st place in the NEC after defeating LIU Brooklyn in the annual Battle of Brooklyn. For St. Francis Brooklyn, it marks being in first place after 10 games since starting 8–2 in the 2003–04 season. That year the Terriers finished 12–6 and shared the NEC regular season title with Monmouth. On February 21, 2015 the Terriers clinched the NEC regular season Championship and recorded their first 20+ win season since the 1998–99 season. The Terriers closed out the regular season at 21–10 overall and 15–3 in conference play. Prior to the beginning of the NEC Tournament, the NEC announced Glenn Braica as the Jim Phelan Coach of the Year, Jalen Cannon as the NEC Player of the Year and Amdy Fall as the NEC Defensive Player of the Year. In the NEC Tournament, the Terriers defeated LIU Brooklyn and Saint Francis (PA) to reach the Championship game, where they lost to Robert Morris. Because of the loss the Terriers didn't receive the NEC's automatic NCAA bid, instead they participated in the 2015 National Invitation Tournament by virtue of having won the NEC regular season championship. It is the programs first NIT postseason appearance since 1963. The Terriers traveled to Richmond, Virginia to face the Spiders and lost 74–84 in the first round of the NIT. The Terriers ended their season at 23–12 overall, tying the programs record for wins in a season last set in 1953–54.

From 2015-2017, the Terriers posted three consecutive losing seasons and in the 2016–17 season the Terriers failed to reach the NEC Tournament for the first time in Braica's tenure as head coach. For the 2018-19 season, the Terriers posted a winning record (17–15) and although they were eliminated in the opening round of the 2019 NEC tournament, they were selected to participate in the 2019 CollegeInsider.com Postseason Tournament. It is the first time the Terriers have been selected to participate in the CIT.

=== Termination of intercollegiate athletics (2023) ===
With the announcement that St. Francis would end sponsorship of intercollegiate athletics, the Terriers' 2022-23 season would be their last. The college cited financial and enrollment concerns stemming from the effects of the COVID-19 pandemic as the reason behind its decision.

== Yearly record ==
St. Francis Brooklyn Terriers annual win percentage from 1920 to 2018. Bars specify the win percentage per year, with blue bars indicating above 50% win seasons and red bars indicating at or below 50%.

Under Glenn Braica:

St. Francis Brooklyn Terriers
Season	Head coach	Conference	Season results			Post-Season Tournament results	
Season	Head coach	Conference	Overall	Conference	Standing	Conference	NIT, CIT, NCAA
2010–11	Glenn Braica	NEC	15–15	10–8	5th	Quarterfinal (0–1)	—
2011–12	Glenn Braica	NEC	15–15	12–6	4th	Quarterfinal (0–1)	—
2012–13	Glenn Braica	NEC	12–18	8–10	8th	Quarterfinal (0–1)	—
2013–14	Glenn Braica	NEC	18–14	9–7	T-4th	Quarterfinal (0–1)	—
2014–15	Glenn Braica	NEC	23–12	15–3	1st	Final (2–1)	NIT first round (0–1)
2015–16	Glenn Braica	NEC	15–17	11–7	T-2nd	Quarterfinal (0–1)	—
2016–17	Glenn Braica	NEC	4–27	2–16	10th	DNQ	—
2017–18	Glenn Braica	NEC	13–18	10–8	T-4th	Quarterfinal (0–1)	—
2018–19	Glenn Braica	NEC	17–16	9–9	T-5th	Quarterfinal (0–1)	CIT first round (0–1)
2019–20	Glenn Braica	NEC	13–18	7–11	T-6th	Quarterfinal (0–1)	—
10 seasons			145–170	93–85	1 NEC title (Regular season)	2–9 in NEC Tournament; 0 tournament titles	0–1 in NIT, (1 bid); 0–1 in CIT, (1 bid)
Legend
Conference regular season champion Conference tournament champion Conference regular season and conference tournament champion Post-season tournament invitation Post-season tournament champion NCAA national champion

== Postseason ==
=== NCIT results ===
St. Francis participated in 4 consecutive National Catholic Invitational Tournaments from 1949 to 1952 and won 1 Championship in 1951. Their overall record is 10–3 in their 4 appearances and they made the Finals in three of their four appearances.

Year	Round	Opponent	Result, Score
1949	First round Second Round; Semi-finals; Finals	St. Norbert's; St. Thomas; St. Benedict's; Regis	W, 61–53; W, 59–41; W, 69–40; L, 47–51
1950	First round Semi-finals; Finals	Creighton; Iona; Siena	W, 67–66; W, 62–61; L, 50–57
1951	First round Second Round; Semi-finals; Finals	Spring Hill; Loras; Le Moyne; Seattle	W, 74–65; W, 65–63; W, 84–66; W, 93–79
1952	Second Round; Semi-finals; Third-place game	Le Moyne; Marquette; Siena	W, 75–61; L, 57–79; L, 50–64

=== NAIA results ===
The Terriers appeared in the 1955 NAIA men's basketball tournament. St. Francis first participated in the NAIA District 31 playoffs to qualify for the tournament, where they defeated Saint Peter's (63–55) and Panzer College (80–70). Their record in the tournament is 0–1 and have only made one appearance in their history.

Year	Round	Opponent	Result, Score
1955	First round	Quincy (Ill.)	L, 82–84

=== NIT results ===
The Terriers have appeared in four National Invitation Tournaments and one NIT Season Tip-Off. Their combined record is 3–5 (0–1, Tip-Off) and they reached the third-place game in 1956, losing to Saint Joseph's and finishing 4th in the tournament. In the 1963 National Invitation Tournament the Terriers were one of 12 teams selected for the tournament. The Terriers who were coached by Daniel Lynch were the 4th best defense in the country and faced the best offense in Miami. St. Francis had the bigger Miami on the ropes with a 66–65 lead with 3:38 to play, led by Jim Raftery who scored 23 points. Yet the Terriers went on to lose 71–70 to Miami which featured future NBA all-star Rick Barry.

Year	Round	Opponent	Result, Score
1954	First round Quarterfinals	Louisville; Holy Cross	W, 60–55; L, 69–93
1956	First round Quarterfinals; Semifinals; Third-place game	Lafayette; Niagara; Dayton; Saint Joseph's	W, 85–74; W, 74–72; L, 58–89; L, 82–93
1963	First round	Miami (FL)	L, 70–71
2015	First round	Richmond	L, 74–84

=== CIT results ===
The Terriers appeared in their only CollegeInsider.com Postseason Tournament in 2019 under head coach Glenn Braica. In the 2019 tournament, St. Francis Brooklyn faced Hampton, their first game against each other in history. The Terriers lost to Hampton 72–81 in the opening round of the CIT.

Year	Round	Opponent	Result, Score
2019	First round	Hampton	L, 72–81

== Coaches ==
		Overall		Conference		
Name	Years	Won-Lost	Pct.	Won-Lost	Pct.	Notes
Brother Phillip	1920–21 (1yr)	14–3	82.4%			
Frank Brennan	1921–26 (5yr)	64–38	62.7%			
Nip Lynch	1926–28 (2yr)	11–20	35.5%			
Edward Keating	1928–30 (2yr)	15–20	42.9%			
George Hinchcliffe	1930–32 (2yr)	26–29	47.3%			
Rody Cooney	1932–41 (9yr)	116–77	60.1%	25–30	45.5%	
Joseph Brennan	1941–48 (7yr)	90–46	66.2%	8–13	38.1%	Member of the Basketball Hall of Fame and Terrier coach with highest winning percentage
Daniel Lynch	1948–69 (21yr)	282–233	54.8%	43–51	45.7%	3x Regular season Conference Champion, 3 NIT appearances and All-Time Terrier Wins leader
Lester Yellin	1969–73 (4yr)	37–59	38.5%			
Jack Prenderville	1973–75 (2yr)	18–32	36.0%			
Lucio Rossini	1975–79 (4yr)	55–48	53.4%			
Gene Roberti	1979–84 (5yr)	43–92	31.9%	16–29	35.6%	
Bob Valvano	1984–88 (4yr)	38–74	33.9%	17–45	27.4%	
Rich Zvosec	1988–91 (3yr)	35–48	42.1%	17–31	35.4%	1991 NEC Coach of the Year
Ron Ganulin	1991–05 (14yr)	187–207	47.5%	129–125	50.8%	2x Regular season Conference Champion, 1 NIT preseason bid and 2x NEC Coach of the Year
Brian Nash	2005–2010 (5yr)	47–99	32.2%	33–57	36.7%	
Glenn Braica	2010–2023 (14yr)	145–170	46%	93–85	52.2%	2x NEC Coach of the Year (2012, 2015), Regular season Conference Champion (2015), 1 NIT bid and 1 CIT bid
Totals	1920–2018	1223–1295	48.6%	381–466	45%	

== Rivalry ==
The Battle of Brooklyn plaque listing the past winners since 1976

The fiercest rival of the Terriers are the Long Island University Blackbirds and they have competed since 1928. Beginning in the 1975–76 season the two programs formalized their rivalry with the annual Battle of Brooklyn game. The name of the annual match-up is in reference to the first major battle of the American Revolutionary War, the Battle of Brooklyn. The location of the two campuses in the New York City borough of Brooklyn and their close proximity, less than 1 mile apart, adds to the intensity of the rivalry and is the origin of the rivalry's name. The Battle of Brooklyn is dedicated to William Lai and Daniel Lynch, former athletic directors at Long Island University and St. Francis College, respectively. At the conclusion of the game the most valuable player is presented with the Lai-Lynch Trophy. As of 2020, St. Francis has a Battle record of 20–25 against LIU. The annual tournament is held at the host campus and the host alternates annually.

The Terriers also compete against Wagner College Seahawks, and it is referred to as Battle of the Verrazano due to St. Francis College in Brooklyn being separated from Wagner College in Staten Island by the Verrazzano–Narrows Bridge. The Battle of the Verrazano dates back to the 1973–1974 season, but is not as formal as the Battle of Brooklyn.

The Terriers also have a rivalry with St. John's University men's basketball program. The Terriers played against St. John's in their inaugural season, 1907, losing to them 12–23. There are published accounts of the Terriers stealing the St. John's mascot. One such instance occurred on March 10, 1941, after a game at Madison Square Garden that saw the Terriers defeat St. John's 55-41. The St. John's mascot was kidnapped and a ransom note was sent, eventually the mascot was recovered. Traditionally, the most valuable player of the game was awarded the Catholic Youth Organization (CYO) trophy.

=== Vs. NEC Opponents ===
St. Francis Brooklyn vs.	Overall Record	Since Joining NEC (regular season)	NEC Tournament
Bryant	12–9	11–9	0–0
Central Connecticut	31–25	21–18	1–4
Fairleigh Dickinson	43–57	34–40	2–3
LIU	45–69; 20–25 (Battle of Brooklyn)	29–45	2–3
Merrimack Warriors	0–2	0–2	0–0
Mount St. Mary's	34–39	29–30	0–5
Robert Morris	31–51	27–44	2–6
Sacred Heart	22–16	21–16	0–0
Saint Francis (PA)	40–45	36–36	1–2
Wagner	53–46	39–36	2–3
*As of March 5, 2020.

=== Vs. NYC Division I opponents ===
St. Francis Brooklyn vs.	Meetings	Record	Win Pct.	First Meeting	Last Meeting
Columbia	18	8–10	.444	December 16, 1930, L 21–35	December 30, 2014, W 72–64
Fordham	36	13–23	.361	1905-06 season, W 12–8	November 30, 2019, L 59–68
LIU	114	45–69	.395	December 20, 1928, W 28–19	February 18, 2020, W 87–77
Manhattan	74	20–54	.270	1904-05 season, L	December 23, 2018, W 72–56
St. John's	79	12–67	.152	January 10, 1908, L 12–23	December 19, 2018, L 52–86
Wagner	99	53–46	.541	January 12, 1929, W 37–14	February 23, 2020, L 71–75^{OT}
*As of March 3, 2020.

== Terrier records ==
	St. Francis College Records		
	Game	Season	Career
Points	45 John Conforti vs Wagner (January 10, 1970)	680 Ray Minlend (1998–99)	1,720 Jalen Cannon (2011–15)
Points Per Game		24.3 Ray Minlend (1998–99); 24.3 John Conforti (1968–69)	21.3 Dennis McDermott
Rebounds	37 Al Inniss vs Lafayette (March 17, 1956)	477 Al Innis (1957-58)	1,667 Al Inniss (1954–58)
Assists	16 Jim Paguaga vs York College (February 7, 1986)	233 Jim Paguaga (1985–86)	616 Brent Jones (2011–15)
Steals	11 Ron Arnold vs Mount St. Mary's (February 4, 1993)	120 Jim Paguaga (1985–86)	202 Greg Nunn (1997–01)
Blocked Shots	11 Richard Lugo vs Rider (February 12, 1997)	125 Richard Lugo (1996–97)	244 Julian McKelly (1981–86)

Greg Nunn (1997–01) was the first player in the program to record 500 points and 500 assists then Brent Jones (2011–15) joined him in 2015 and soon exceeded him by becoming the first player to record 1,000 points and 500 assists. That same year Jalen Cannon became the first Terrier to record 1,500 points and 1,000 rebounds. Cannon then became the Northeast Conference all-time leader in rebounds by surpassing 1,033 and the St. Francis Brooklyn all-time scorer by surpassing 1,633 points. Cannon finished with 1,720 points and 1,159 rebounds.

=== NCAA records ===
Notable records include Vernon Stokes leading the country in field goal percentage with 59.5% shooting during the 1952–53 season. Ray Minlends 1998–99 record for points in a season was also second in the country that year behind Alvin Young's (Niagara) 728. Ron Arnold's record for steals in a game is the 3rd highest in NCAA history- the record is 13 and he had 11 against Mount St. Mary's. In 1991, Lester James recorded a 69.3% field goal percentage, which is tied for 21st all-time. Jim Paguaga's 120 steals in 1986 is tied for 16th all-time and his steal average that season, 4.29, is 8th all-time.

== Accolades ==
=== Naismith Memorial Basketball Hall of Fame ===
- Joseph Brennan, inducted as a coach in 1975
- Dick Bavetta ('62), inducted as a referee in 2015

=== All-Americans ===
- Jalen Cannon ('15), 2015 AP Honorable Mention

=== Northeast Conference (1981–present) ===
Season	NEC Player of the Year	NEC Defensive Player of the Year	NEC Coach of the Year	First Team All-NEC	Second Team ALL-NEC	NEC Rookie of the Year
1981–82						
1982–83						
1983–84	Robert Jackson			Robert Jackson		
1984–85					Chris Phillips	
1985–86						
1986–87				Darrwin Purdie		
1987–88						Andre Kibbler
1988–89					Darrwin Purdie	
1989–90					Steve Mickens	
1990–91			Rich Zvosec		Ron Arnold	Ron Arnold
1991–92					Lester James	
1992–93					Ron Arnold	
1993–94						
1994–95						
1995–96					Robert Bailey	
1996–97					John Thomas	
1997–98			Ron Ganulin		Roque Osorio, John Thomas	Richy Dominguez
1998–99	Ray Minlend			Ray Minlend	Angel Santana	
1999–00				Steven Howard, Angel Santana		
2000–01		Greg Nunn		Richy Dominguez, Steven Howard		
2001–02					Jason Morgan	
2002–03				Clifford Strong		
2003–04			Ron Ganulin		Mike Wilson	
2004–05					Tory Cavalieri	Allan Sheppard
2005–06						
2006–07					Robert Hines	
2007–08						
2008–09					Ricky Cadell	
2009–10					Akeem Bennett	
2010–11		Akeem Bennett			Akeem Bennett, Ricky Cadell	
2011–12			Glenn Braica			
2012–13					Jalen Cannon	
2013–14				Jalen Cannon		
2014–15	Jalen Cannon	Amdy Fall	Glenn Braica	Brent Jones, Jalen Cannon		
2015–16		Amdy Fall				
2016–17						Rasheem Dunn
2017–18					Rasheem Dunn	Jalen Jordan
2018–19					Jalen Jordan	
2019–20						

== Terriers in professional leagues ==
=== NBA ===
There has been a total of 11 Terriers drafted by NBA teams.

Terriers in the NBA draft
Year	Player	Round	Overall pick	Team
1949	Tom Gallagher		45	Baltimore Bullets
1951	Jim Luisi	6	56	Boston Celtics
1951	Roy Reardon	7	64	Syracuse Nationals
1954	Henry Daubenschmidt	3	23	Boston Celtics
1956	Dan Mannix		63	Rochester Royals
1957	Walter Adamushko	6	42	Detroit Pistons
1958	Alvin B. Inniss	6	40	Minneapolis Lakers
1967	Gil Radday	8	84	New York Knicks
1974	Dennis McDermott	8	140	New York Knicks
1978	Nestor Cora	8	165	Washington Bullets

=== Other leagues ===
- Gunnar Olafsson ('18), signed with Oviedo CB of the LEB Oro league in Spain.
- Dagur Jonsson, signed with Grindavik of the Icelandic Men's Premier League
- Tyreek Jewell ('16), signed with Satria Muda Pertamina Jakarta of the Indonesian Basketball League.
- Chris Hooper ('16), signed with the Reading Rockets of the Division 1 English Basketball League.
- Jalen Cannon ('15), signed with Jefes de Fuerza Lagunera of the Mexican National Professional Basketball league, the top league of basketball in Mexico.
- Ben Mockford ('14), named to Great Britain's senior squad for the EuroBasket and signed with Cáceres of the Spanish LEB Oro league.
- Akeem Johnson ('13), signed with Kauhajoen Karhu of the Korisliiga, the top league of basketball in Finland.
- Stefan Perunicic ('12), signed with Aries Trikala B.C. of the Greek Basket League.
- Akeem Bennett ('11), 1st pick in the 8th round by the Springfield Armor of the NBA Development League.
- Ricky Cadell ('11), signed with FC Porto, of the Portuguese Basketball League.
- Alex Harrington ('11), playing with the Lake Michigan Admirals of the Premier Basketball League as of 2013.
- Kayode Ayeni ('10), playing with Qatar's Al-Arabi Sports Club as of 2013.
- Tanel Tein ('99), Estonian retired professional basketball player.
- Richard Lugo, played one season with the Terriers (1996–97) and went on to have a 13-year career in professional basketball.

== Retired numbers ==
No.	Player	Career
22	Denis McDermott	1971–74
19	Alvin Inniss	1954–58

The St. Francis Brooklyn men's basketball program has honored only two former players, Denis McDermott and Alvin Inniss, by retiring their numbers. McDermott was the first Terrier to have his number retired. He graduated as the career leading scorer (fourth all-time as of 2019–20) in the programs history and was drafted by the New York Knicks in 1974. McDermott also has the program's highest scoring average at 21.3 points per game over 74 career games. In his senior year, McDermott averaged a double-double per game with 23.8 points and 10.8 rebounds. The second Terrier to have his number retired was Alvin Inniss, on February 1, 2020. Innis played from 1954–58, his teams compiled a 64–35 record and participated in the 1955 NAIA men's basketball tournament and the 1956 National Invitation Tournament. Prior to McDermott becoming the career leading scorer, Innis held the title with 1,503 points. Innis continues to be the Terriers' all-time leading rebounder with 1,667 career rebounds.

== Notable games ==
- On February 11, 1939, St. Francis College won the first double-overtime game in Madison Square Garden history against Manhattan College, 53–49.
- On February 2, 1952, St. Francis participated in and won New York City's first ever quadruple overtime basketball game (professional or collegiate) against Seton Hall, 82–70.
- On March 6, 1954, the Terriers upset 20th ranked Louisville in the opening round of the 1954 NIT, with 16,259 spectators in attendance at Madison Square Garden.
- On March 17, 1956, Al Inniss set the St. Francis single-game rebounding record with 37 against Lafayette in the first round of the 1956 National Invitation Tournament. That season the Terriers went as far as the semifinals in the NIT, finishing 4th. The 37 rebounds are still a Madison Square Garden and National Invitational Tournament record for most rebounds in a college game.
- On January 10, 1970, John Conforti made 20 field goals and scored 45 points against Wagner, both are Terrier records.
- On March 5, 2001, St. Francis was 14 minutes away from the school's first appearance in the NCAA tournament. They were facing Monmouth in the Championship game of the 2001 NEC tournament and enjoying a 20-point lead, when it unraveled and they ended up losing 64–67 in a nationally televised game on ESPN.
- On February 22, 2003, the Terriers hosted the LIU Brooklyn Blackbirds at The Pope for the annual Battle of Brooklyn and both teams set a NEC record for points in a game. The match-up went into double overtime and featured 282 points, with St. Francis winning 142–140.
- On November 8, 2013, St. Francis Brooklyn defeated defending ACC tournament champions Miami (FL) 66–62 in overtime. It marked the programs first win against an ACC opponent.
- On March 10, 2015, St. Francis Brooklyn was 3 points short of their first NCAA tournament. They were facing Robert Morris down 63–66 with 13 seconds left. With 11 seconds Robert Morris fouled on a 3-point shot attempt, but the Terriers missed all three free-throws.

== Notable players ==
=== 1,000 point club ===
Rank	Player name	Points	Seasons played
1	Jalen Cannon	1,720	2011–15
2	Ricky Cadell	1,662	2007–11
3	Darwin Purdie	1,613	1985–89
4	Dennis McDermott	1,578	1971–74
5	Manny Figueroa	1,532	1975–79
6	Al Inniss	1,503	1954–58
7	Jerome Williams	1,490	1972–76
8	Richy Dominguez	1,482	1997–01
9	Angel Santana	1,476	1996–00
10	John Conforti	1,435	1967–70
11	Gerard Trapp	1,434	1974–78
12	Glenn Sanabria	1,347	2014–19
13	Vernon Stokes	1,336	1950–53
14	Anthony D'Elia	1,304	1954–58
15	Lou Myers	1,259	1989–93
16	Robert Jackson	1,243	1981–84

Rank	Player name	Points	Seasons played
17	Jamaal Womack	1,153	2005–09
18	Stefan Perunicic	1,144	2008–12
18	Brent Jones	1,144	2011–15
20	Hank Daubenschmidt	1,129	1951–54
21	Jim Raftery	1,114	1960–63
22	Kevin Henry	1,111	1979–83
23	Ron Arnold	1,105	1990–93
24	Lester Yellin	1,102	1954–58
25	Cliff Strong	1,090	2000–03
26	Steven Howard	1,081	1999–01
27	Ben Mockford	1,077	2010–14
28	Gil Radday	1,068	1964–67
29	Nestor Cora	1,034	1977–79
30	Roy Reardon	1,028	1948–51
31	Lorenzo Distant	1,027	1979–83
32	Akeem Johnson	1,009	2009–13
