= Bob Valvano =

American sports radio personality (born 1957)

Biographical details
- Born: January 29, 1957 (age 69); Queens, New York, U.S.

Playing career

Basketball
- 1975–1977: Virginia Wesleyan

Soccer
- 1976–1978: Virginia Wesleyan

Golf
- 1976–1979: Virginia Wesleyan

Coaching career (HC unless noted)

Basketball
- 1979–1982: Hofstra (asst)
- 1982–1984: Kutztown
- 1984–1988: St. Francis (NY)
- 1989–1992: Catholic University
- 1992–1994: St. Mary's (MD)
- 1994–1998: Bellarmine

Head coaching record
- Overall: 178–226

Accomplishments and honors

Championships
- CAC regular season (1992)

Awards
- CAC Coach of the Year (1992)

Bob Valvano (born January 29, 1957) is an American former college basketball coach and a sportscaster based in Louisville, Kentucky.

== Broadcasting and coaching ==
During the college-basketball season, he is the lead game analyst for ESPNRadio, and occasionally for ESPNU. When not doing those games, Valvano is the color analyst for University of Louisville men's basketball games on radio 93.9 The Ville. Valvano began his coaching career at Hofstra University in Hempstead, New York where he was an assistant to head coach Dick Berg for three years. Then he took over the head coaching position at Division II Kutztown in Kutztown, Pennsylvania. Valvano coached there for two years, setting the single-season record for wins his second year, before taking the head coaching position at St. Francis College in Brooklyn, New York in 1984. At the time of Valvano's hiring he was the youngest head coach in Division I men's basketball at 27 years old. While with the Terriers, He did not have a winning season but did win the college's first postseason game in over 30 years in 1988.

In 1988, he went to Alvik, Sweden in western Stockholm to coach the Alvik Professional Basketball Club. After a year in Sweden, he returned to take the head coaching position at Division III Catholic University of America in Washington, D.C., where his third team there had the first 20-win season in school history, (20–6), and set 6 NCAA records for 3-point shooting.

Valvano then went to St. Mary's College of Maryland in St Mary's, where his team had the school's first winning season ever playing at the NCAA level in 1994. In 1994, Valvano took the head coaching job at Bellarmine University in Louisville, where his teams improved for four straight years, culminating in back-to-back winning seasons (16–11, 17–10) his last two seasons.

== Radio ==
Valvano hosts a daily radio show (The V Show) on ESPN680 in Louisville from noon until 3 weekdays. He had hosted a late night show on ESPN Radio (under the same V Show moniker) for over twelve years. SI's Richard Deitsch named Valvano his National Sportsradio Voice of the Year in 2012. Valvano was also named Kentucky Sportscaster of the Year in 2016.

== Personal life ==
Valvano graduated cum laude from Virginia Wesleyan College in Virginia Beach in 1979, where he majored in communications and lettered in soccer, basketball, and golf. (He was voted All-Conference First team as a goalkeeper and still holds the career record for saves at VWC.) He was inducted into the college's Sports Hall of Fame in its inaugural class in 2009. He is married to Darlene and they have two sons, Nicholas and Jamison.

Valvano is the younger brother of the late North Carolina State college basketball coach and TV commentator Jim Valvano. He is active in the V Foundation, Jim Valvano's legacy in the fight against cancer, and authored a book about his brother titled "The Gifts of Jimmy V".
