= Metropolitan New York Conference =

NCAA athletic conference, 1933–1963

- Founded: 1933
- Folded: 1963
- Sports fielded: College basketball
- No. of teams: 5 to 9

The Metropolitan New York Conference was an NCAA athletic conference consisting of teams in the New York City metropolitan area. The conference existed from 1933 to 1963.

== Membership ==
Institution	Location	Joined	Left	Current Conference	Nickname
Brooklyn College	Brooklyn, New York	1933	1949	CUNYAC	Kingsmen (now Bulldogs)
City College of New York	New York, New York	1933	1953	CUNYAC	Beavers
Columbia University	New York, New York	1933	1939	Ivy League	Lions
Fordham University	Bronx, New York	1933	1963	Atlantic 10 (A-10)	Rams
Hofstra University	Hempstead, New York	1942	1943	CAA	Flying Dutchmen (now Pride)
Long Island University	Brooklyn, New York	1933	1939	Northeast (NEC)	Blackbirds (now Sharks)
Manhattan College	Riverdale, New York	1933	1963	MAAC	Jaspers
New York University	New York, New York	1933	1963	UAA	Violets
Pratt Institute	Brooklyn, New York	1933	1934	Atlantic East	Cannoneers
St. Francis College	Brooklyn Heights, New York	1933	1963	Dropped athletics	Terriers
St. John's University	Jamaica, New York	1933	1963	Big East	Redmen (now Red Storm)

== Regular season champions ==
=== Men's basketball ===
- 1934 NYU
- 1935 DNP
- 1936 Long Island
- 1937 Long Island
- 1938 NYU
- 1939 Long Island
- 1940 DNP
- 1941 DNP
- 1942 DNP
- 1943 St. John's
- 1944 DNP
- 1945 DNP
- 1946 NYU/St. John's (NY)
- 1947 St. John's (NY)
- 1948 NYU
- 1949 Manhattan/St. John's (NY)
- 1950 CCNY
- 1951 St. John's (NY)
- 1952 St. John’s (N.Y.)
- 1953 Manhattan
- 1954 St. Francis (N.Y.)
- 1955 Manhattan
- 1956 St. Francis (N.Y.)
- 1957 NYU
- 1958 St. John's (NY)
- 1959 Manhattan
- 1960 NYU
- 1961 St. John's (NY)
- 1962 St. John's (NY)
- 1963 Fordham
