= Lester Yellin =

American college basketball player and coach (1935–1987)

Biographical details
- Born: May 22, 1935; Brooklyn, New York, U.S.
- Died: March 11, 1987 (aged 51); Brooklyn, New York, U.S.

Playing career

Basketball
- 1954–1958: St. Francis (NY)

Coaching career (HC unless noted)
- 1969–1973: St. Francis (NY)
- 1973–1974: Jacksonville (assistant)

Head coaching record
- Overall: 37–59 .385

Lester Yellin (May 22, 1935 – March 11, 1987) was an American basketball player and coach at St. Francis College in Brooklyn.

== Biography ==
Yellin was a member of the St. Francis Brooklyn Terriers men's basketball team from 1954 to 1958. Over 96 games, he averaged 11.5 points and 3.2 rebounds per game. He was a member of the St. Francis team that made it to the semifinals of the 1956 National Invitation Tournament. He was the sixth player in team history to score 1,000 career points.

Yellin was the head coach at his alma mater from 1969 to 1973, compiling a record of 37–59. During his final season, he was under unusual stress due to the death of his parents in a plane crash. On February 6, 1973, he took a swing at referee Ed Warren after being ejected in a game against Le Moyne. Yellin was assessed 4 technical fouls, which helped seal the win for Le Moyne. Yellin resigned as head coach at the end of the season, but was convinced by Jacksonville head coach Bob Gottlieb to take an assistant job. According to Gottlieb, he believed that the change of scenery following his parents' deaths would help Yellin, "but it seemed to have the opposite effect". Yellin resigned after one season for personal reasons.

Yellin returned to Brooklyn, where he remained until his death on March 11, 1987 at the age of 51. He was survived by his wife and two sons.
