= Central Connecticut Blue Devils men's basketball statistical leaders =

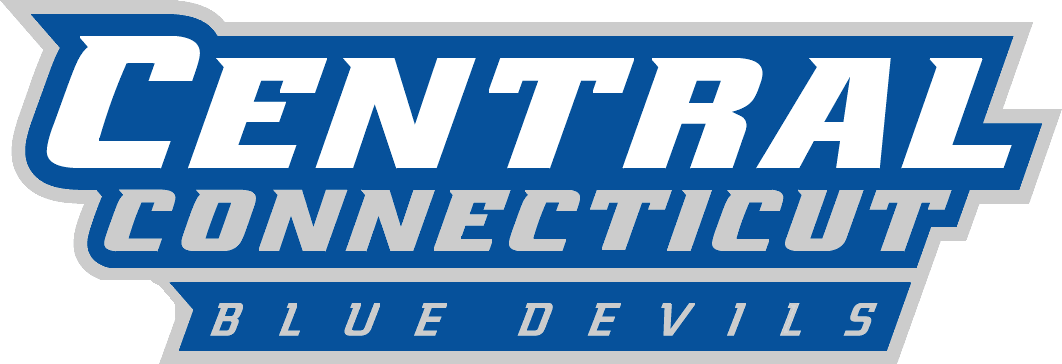

The Central Connecticut Blue Devils men's basketball statistical leaders are individual statistical leaders of the Central Connecticut Blue Devils men's basketball program in various categories, including points, rebounds, assists, steals, and blocks. Within those areas, the lists identify single-game, single-season, and career leaders. The Blue Devils represent Central Connecticut State University in the NCAA's Northeast Conference.

Central Connecticut began competing in intercollegiate basketball in 1934. However, the school's record book does not generally list records from before the 1950s, as records from before this period are often incomplete and inconsistent. Since scoring was much lower in this era, and teams played much fewer games during a typical season, it is likely that few or no players from this era would appear on these lists anyway.

The NCAA did not officially record assists as a stat until the 1983–84 season, and blocks and steals until the 1985–86 season, but Central Connecticut's record books includes players in these stats before these seasons. These lists are updated through the end of the 2020–21 season.

== Scoring ==
Career
Rk	Player	Points	Seasons
1	Ken Horton	1,966	2007–08 2008–09 2010–11 2011–12
2	Damian Johnson	1,734	1989–90 1990–91 1991–92 1992–93
3	Corsley Edwards	1,731	1998–99 1999–00 2000–01 2001–02
4	Rich Leonard	1,697	1980–81 1981–82 1982–83 1983–84
5	Bill Reaves	1,647	1967–68 1968–69 1969–70 1970–71
6	Rick Mickens	1,632	1996–97 1997–98 1998–99 1999–00
7	Tristan Blackwood	1,605	2004–05 2005–06 2006–07 2007–08
8	Gene Reilly	1,597	1962–63 1963–64 1964–65 1965–66
9	Bryan Heron	1,558	1985–86 1986–87 1987–88 1988–89
10	Robby Ptacek	1,531	2008–09 2009–10 2010–11 2011–12

Season
Rk	Player	Points	Season
1	Kyle Vinales	649	2012–13
2	Bill Reaves	645	1969–70
3	Darin Smith Jr.	621	2025–26
4	Ken Horton	606	2010–11
5	Damian Johnson	605	1992–93
6	Bryan Heron	590	1988–89
7	John Pruitt	586	1983–84
8	Tristan Blackwood	583	2006–07
9	Javier Mojica	571	2006–07
10	Damian Johnson	554	1991–92

Single game
Rk	Player	Points	Season	Opponent
1	Paul Zajac	47	1966–67	St. Anselm
2	Kyle Vinales	42	2012–13	Wagner
3	Obet Vazquez	41	1990–91	Radford
4	Matt Hunter	40	2012–13	Indiana
	Tristan Blackwood	40	2006–07	Robert Morris
	Bill Reaves	40	1969–70	Stonehill
	John Pruitt	40	1983–84	New Haven
	Darin Smith Jr.	40	2025–26	New Haven
9	Gene Reilly	39	1963–64	Rhode Island
	Steve Ayers	39	1980–81	Sacred Heart
	Bryan Heron	39	1987–88	Delaware
	Kyle Vinales	39	2011–12	Niagara
	Ken Horton	39	2011–12	Mount St. Mary's

== Rebounds ==
Career
Rk	Player	Rebounds	Seasons
1	Tyrone Canino	1,243	1983–84 1984–85 1985–86 1986–87 1987–88
2	Ken Hightower	1,129	1980–81 1981–82 1982–83 1983–84
3	Howie Dickenman	1,040	1966–67 1967–68 1968–69
4	Ron Robinson	1,022	2000–01 2001–02 2002–03 2003–04
5	Rich Leonard	1,001	1980–81 1981–82 1982–83 1983–84
6	Obie Nwadike	980	2003–04 2004–05 2005–06 2006–07
7	Corsley Edwards	967	1998–99 1999–00 2000–01 2001–02
8	Brandon Peel	881	2012–13 2013–14 2014–15 2015–16
9	Ken Horton	842	2007–08 2008–09 2010–11 2011–12
10	Bill Hunter	825	1968–69 1969–70 1970–71

Season
Rk	Player	Rebounds	Season
1	Ken Hightower	420	1983–84
2	Howie Dickenman	410	1968–69
3	Tyrone Canino	354	1985–86
4	Howie Dickenman	346	1966–67
5	Obie Nwadike	331	2006–07
6	Tyrone Canino	321	1987–88
7	Greg Roberts	301	1977–78
8	Bill Hunter	299	1970–71
	Obie Nwadike	299	2005–06
10	Dan Jones	298	1973–74

Single game
Rk	Player	Rebounds	Season	Opponent
1	Howie Dickenman	32	1967–68	Trenton State
2	Howie Dickenman	26	1968–69	Bridgeport
	Ken Hightower	26	1983–84	Sacred Heart
4	Dan Jones	25	1974–75	Quinnipiac
5	Howie Dickenman	24	1966–67	Norwich
	Howie Dickenman	24	1968–69	Vermont
	Tyrone Canino	24	1985–86	Salem
8	Stan Pelcher	23	1965–66	Worcester
	Howie Dickenman	23	1966–67	Northeastern
	Howie Dickenman	23	1968–69	Southern Conn.
	Howie Dickenman	23	1968–69	Merrimack
	Tyrone Canino	23	1985–86	Bridgeport
	Tyrone Canino	23	1986–87	UMBC

== Assists ==
Career
Rk	Player	Assists	Seasons
1	Johnny Kidd	567	1980–81 1981–82 1982–83 1983–84 1984–85
2	Tristan Blackwood	506	2004–05 2005–06 2006–07 2007–08
3	Shemik Thompson	483	2007–08 2008–09 2009–10 2010–11
4	Dwayne Jones	469	1983–84 1984–85 1985–86 1986–87
5	Jere Quinn	413	1973–74 1974–75 1975–76 1976–77
6	David Corbitt	370	1990–91 1991–92 1992–93
7	Rich Leonard	329	1980–81 1981–82 1982–83 1983–84
8	Malcolm McMillan	327	2011–12 2012–13 2013–14 2014–15
9	Kyle Vinales	296	2011–12 2012–13 2013–14
10	Bill Wendt	293	1970–71 1971–72 1972–73
	Nigel Scantlebury	293	2020–21 2021–22 2022–23

Season
Rk	Player	Assists	Season
1	Jere Quinn	227	1975–76
2	Jay Rodgers	206	2025–26
3	David Corbitt	191	1991–92
4	Johnny Kidd	186	1982–83
5	Shemik Thompson	163	2010–11
6	Tristan Blackwood	155	2007–08
7	Johnny Kidd	567	1981–82
8	Tristan Blackwood	140	2006–07
9	Shemik Thompson	135	2008–09
10	Dwayne Jones	129	1984–85

Single game
Rk	Player	Assists	Season	Opponent
1	Jere Quinn	18	1975–76	Sacred Heart
2	Jere Quinn	16	1975–76	Bryant
	Johnny Kidd	16	1982–83	Sacred Heart
	David Corbitt	16	1991–92	Buffalo
5	Jere Quinn	15	1975–76	New Haven
6	Jere Quinn	14	1975–76	Hartford
	Jere Quinn	14	1975–76	Union
	Johnny Kidd	14	1981–82	St. Michaels
	Jay Rodgers	14	2025–26	Long Island University

== Steals ==
Career
Rk	Player	Steals	Seasons
1	Rick Mickens	266	1996–97 1997–98 1998–99 1999–00
2	Rich Leonard	256	1980–81 1981–82 1982–83 1983–84
3	Damian Johnson	204	1989–90 1990–91 1991–92 1992–93
4	Shemik Thompson	202	2007–08 2008–09 2009–10 2010–11
5	David Corbitt	174	1990–91 1991–92 1992–93
6	Victor Payne	160	1996–97 1997–98 1998–99 1999–00
7	Tristan Blackwood	139	2004–05 2005–06 2006–07 2007–08
	Ken Horton	139	2007–08 2008–09 2010–11 2011–12
9	Dean Walker	136	1997–98 1998–99 1999–00 2000–01
10	Ron Robinson	134	2000–01 2001–02 2002–03 2003–04

Season
Rk	Player	Steals	Season
1	Rick Mickens	93	1999–00
2	Rick Mickens	90	1998–99
3	David Corbitt	88	1991–92
4	Matt Hunter	78	2012–13
5	Damian Johnson	71	1992–93
6	Damian Johnson	68	1991–92

Single game
Rk	Player	Steals	Season	Opponent
1	Wayne Campbell	9	1987–88	Vermont
	Rick Mickens	9	1998–99	Brown
3	Victor Payne	7	1996–97	UMKC
	Scott Hasenjaeger	7	1993–94	Youngstown
	Dwhawn Edwards	7	1995–96	Chicago
	David Corbitt	7	1991–92	Hartford
	Damian Johnson	7	1991–92	Hofstra

== Blocks ==
Career
Rk	Player	Blocks	Seasons
1	Keith Closs	317	1994–95 1995–96
2	Corsley Edwards	198	1998–99 1999–00 2000–01 2001–02
3	Ken Horton	197	2007–08 2008–09 2010–11 2011–12
4	Brandon Peel	170	2012–13 2013–14 2014–15 2015–16
5	Joe Efese	150	2009–10 2010–11 2011–12 2012–13
6	Jemino Sobers	127	2003–04 2004–05 2005–06 2006–07
7	Abdul Momoh	117	2021–22 2022–23 2023–24 2024–25
8	Jayden Brown	114	2021–22 2022–23 2023–24 2024–25
9	Byron Smith	103	1990–91 1991–92 1992–93 1993–94
10	Mustafa Jones	99	2014–15 2015–16 2016–17 2017–18

Season
Rk	Player	Blocks	Season
1	Keith Closs	178	1995–96
2	Keith Closs	139	1994–95
3	Jemino Sobers	78	2006–07
4	Ken Horton	63	2007–08
5	Corsley Edwards	62	1999–00
6	Brandon Peel	61	2013–14
7	Corsley Edwards	53	1998–99
8	Brandon Peel	52	2014–15
	Max Frazier	52	2025–26
10	Ken Horton	50	2010–11
	Abdul Momoh	50	2024–25

Single game
Rk	Player	Blocks	Season	Opponent
1	Keith Closs	12	1994–95	Saint Francis U
	Keith Closs	12	1995–96	Troy State
3	Keith Closs	11	1995–96	NE Illinois
	Keith Closs	11	1995–96	E. Illinois
5	Keith Closs	10	1995–96	Delaware St.
	Keith Closs	10	1995–96	Saint Francis U
7	Keith Closs	9	1994–95	W. Illinois
8	Keith Closs	8	1994–95	Chicago
	Keith Closs	8	1994–95	St. Francis Brooklyn
	Joe Efese	8	2009–10	Long Island
	Joe Efese	8	2012–13	Sacred Heart
