= List of Northeast Conference men's basketball regular season champions =

This is a list of Northeast Conference men's basketball regular season first-place finishers, including ties.

Year	NEC Regular Season Champion(s)	Head coach	Conference Record
1981–82	Fairleigh Dickinson, North Division; Robert Morris, South Division	Don Feeley; Matt Furjanic	12–3; 9–5
1982–83	LIU Brooklyn, North Division; Robert Morris, South Division	Paul Lizzo; Matt Furjanic	11–3; 12–2
1983–84	LIU Brooklyn†; Robert Morris	Paul Lizzo; Matt Furjanic	11–5
1984–85	Marist	Matt Furjanic	11–3
1985–86	Fairleigh Dickinson	Tom Green	13–3
1986–87	Marist	Dave Magarity	15–1
1987–88	Fairleigh Dickinson†; Marist	Tom Green; Dave Magarity	13–3
1988–89	Robert Morris	Jarrett Durham	12–4
1989–90	Robert Morris	Jarrett Durham	12–4
1990–91	Fairleigh Dickinson; Saint Francis (PA)†	Tom Green; Jim Baron	13–3
1991–92	Robert Morris	Jarrett Durham	12–4
1992–93	Rider	Kevin Bannon	14–4
1993–94	Rider	Kevin Bannon	14–4
1994–95	Rider	Kevin Bannon	13–5
1995–96	Mount St. Mary's	Jim Phelan	16–2
1996–97	LIU Brooklyn	Ray Haskins	15–3
1997–98	LIU Brooklyn	Ray Haskins	14–2
1998–99	UMBC	Tom Sullivan	17–3
1999–00	Central Connecticut	Howie Dickenman	15–3
2000–01	St. Francis (NY)	Ron Ganulin	16–4
2001–02	Central Connecticut	Howie Dickenman	19–1
2002–03	Wagner	Dereck Whittenburg	14–4
2003–04	Monmouth†; St. Francis (NY)	Dave Calloway; Ron Ganulin	12–6
2004–05	Monmouth	Dave Calloway	14–4
2005–06	Fairleigh Dickinson	Tom Green	14–4
2006–07	Central Connecticut	Howie Dickenman	16–2
2007–08	Robert Morris	Mike Rice Jr.	16–2
2008–09	Robert Morris	Mike Rice Jr.	15–3
2009–10	Robert Morris; Quinnipiac†	Mike Rice Jr. Tom Moore	15–3
2010–11	LIU Brooklyn	Jim Ferry	16–2
2011–12	LIU Brooklyn	Jim Ferry	16–2
2012–13	Robert Morris	Andrew Toole	14–4
2013–14	Robert Morris	Andrew Toole	14–2
2014–15	St. Francis Brooklyn	Glenn Braica	15–3
2015–16	Wagner	Bashir Mason	13–5
2016–17	Mount St. Mary's	Jamion Christian	14–4
2017–18	Wagner	Bashir Mason	14–4
2018–19	Saint Francis	Rob Krimmel	12–6
2019–20	Merrimack	Joe Gallo	14–4
2020–21	Wagner	Bashir Mason	13–5
2021–22	Bryant	Jared Grasso	16–2
2022–23	Merrimack	Joe Gallo	12–4
2023–24	Central Connecticut†; Merrimack	Patrick Sellers; Joe Gallo	13–3

† No. 1 seed in NEC tournament

== Winners by school ==
‡	Denotes school is a former member of the NEC

School	Number	Years
Robert Morris^{‡}	11	1981–82, 1982–83, 1983–84, 1988–89, 1989–90, 1991–92, 2007–08, 2008–09, 2009–10, 2012–13, 2013–14
LIU (Note: From 1981 to 2019, Long Island University was represented in the Northeast Conference by its Brooklyn campus, known for athletic purposes as "Long Island" through the 2012–13 season and "LIU Brooklyn" from 2013–14 forward. After the 2018–19 season, LIU merged the athletic programs of its Brooklyn and Post campuses into a single program, now competing as the LIU Sharks, that inherited the NCAA Division I and Northeast Conference memberships of the Brooklyn campus.)	6	1982–83, 1983–84, 1996–97, 1997–98, 2010–11, 2011–12
Fairleigh Dickinson	5	1981–82, 1985–86, 1987–88, 1990–91, 2005–06
Wagner	4	2002–03, 2015–16, 2017–18, 2020–21
Central Connecticut	4	1999–00, 2001–02, 2006–07, 2023–24
Marist^{‡}	3	1984–85, 1986–87, 1987–88
Rider^{‡}	3	1992–93, 1993–94, 1994–95
St. Francis Brooklyn^{‡}	3	2000–01, 2003–04, 2014–15
Merrimack^{‡}	3	2019–20, 2022–23, 2023–24
Monmouth^{‡}	2	2003–04, 2004–05
Mount St. Mary's^{‡}	2	1995–96, 2016–17
Saint Francis	2	1990–91, 2018–19
Bryant^{‡}	1	2021–22
Quinnipiac^{‡}	1	2009–10
UMBC^{‡}	1	1998–99
Le Moyne	0	—
Sacred Heart^{‡}	0	—
Stonehill	0	—
