= 2004 Northeast Conference men's basketball tournament =

- Classification: Division I
- Season: 2003–04
- Teams: 8
- Site: Spiro Sports Center; Staten Island, NY
- Finals site: William T. Boylan Gymnasium; West Long Branch, NJ
- Champions: Monmouth (3rd title)
- Winning coach: Dave Calloway (2nd title)
- MVP: Blake Hamilton (Monmouth)

2003–04 Northeast Conference men's basketball standings
	Conf.				Overall
Team	W		L	PCT	W		L	PCT
Monmouth †	12	–	6	.667	21	–	12	.636
St. Francis (NY)	12	–	6	.667	15	–	13	.536
Fairleigh Dickinson	11	–	7	.611	17	–	12	.586
Robert Morris	10	–	8	.556	14	–	15	.483
Saint Francis (PA)	10	–	8	.556	13	–	15	.464
Wagner	10	–	8	.556	13	–	16	.448
Central Connecticut	9	–	9	.500	14	–	14	.500
Mount St. Mary's	8	–	10	.444	10	–	19	.345
Sacred Heart	8	–	10	.444	12	–	15	.444
Quinnipiac	5	–	13	.278	9	–	20	.310
Long Island	4	–	14	.222	8	–	19	.296
† 2004 NEC tournament winner

The 2004 Northeast Conference men's basketball tournament was held in March. The tournament featured the league's top eight seeds. Monmouth won the championship, its third, and received the conferences automatic bid to the 2004 NCAA Tournament.

== Format ==
The NEC Men's Basketball Tournament consisted of an eight-team playoff format with the quarterfinal and semifinal games played at the Spiro Sports Center in Staten Island, NY. The Championship game was played at the court of the highest remaining seed, Monmouth.

== Bracket ==
Quarterfinals; Spiro Sports Center
1	Monmouth	64
8	Mount St. Mary's	52
4	Robert Morris	58
5	Saint Francis (PA)	43
2	St. Francis (NY)	68
7	Central Connecticut	81
3	Fairleigh Dickinson	69
6	Wagner	67

Semifinals; Spiro Sports Center
1	Monmouth	67
4	Robert Morris	45
7	Central Connecticut	76
3	Fairleigh Dickinson	73^{OT}

Championship Game; William T. Boylan Gymnasium
1	Monmouth	67
7	Central Connecticut	55

== All-tournament team ==
Tournament MVP in bold.

**2004 NEC All-Tournament Team**

**Blake Hamilton**, MONMOUTH
Tamien Trent, FDU
Ron Robinson, CCSU
Dwayne Byfield, MONMOUTH
Tyler Azzarelli, MONMOUTH
