= 2003–04 Monmouth Hawks men's basketball team =

American college basketball season

2003–04 Monmouth Hawks men's basketball

Northeast Conference tournament champions

NCAA tournament
- Conference: Northeast Conference
- Record: 21–12 (12–6 NEC)
- Head coach: Dave Calloway (7th season)
- Home arena: William T. Boylan Gymnasium

2003–04 Northeast Conference men's basketball standings
	Conf.				Overall
Team	W		L	PCT	W		L	PCT
Monmouth †	12	–	6	.667	21	–	12	.636
St. Francis (NY)	12	–	6	.667	15	–	13	.536
Fairleigh Dickinson	11	–	7	.611	17	–	12	.586
Robert Morris	10	–	8	.556	14	–	15	.483
Saint Francis (PA)	10	–	8	.556	13	–	15	.464
Wagner	10	–	8	.556	13	–	16	.448
Central Connecticut	9	–	9	.500	14	–	14	.500
Mount St. Mary's	8	–	10	.444	10	–	19	.345
Sacred Heart	8	–	10	.444	12	–	15	.444
Quinnipiac	5	–	13	.278	9	–	20	.310
Long Island	4	–	14	.222	8	–	19	.296
† 2004 NEC tournament winner

The 2003–04 Monmouth Hawks men's basketball team represented Monmouth University during the 2003–04 NCAA Division I men's basketball season. The Hawks, led by 7th-year head coach Dave Calloway, played their home games at the William T. Boylan Gymnasium and were members of the Northeast Conference. They finished the season 21–12, 12–6 in NEC play to finish tied for first place. They won the Northeast Conference Basketball tournament to earn the conference's automatic bid to the NCAA tournament. Playing as the No. 15 seed in the South region, the Hawks were beaten by No. 2 seed Mississippi State in the opening round.

== Roster ==
2003–04 Monmouth Hawks men's basketball team
Players
Coaches

Pos.	#	Name	Height	Weight	Year	Previous school	Hometown
F	1	Dejan Delic	6 ft 6 in (1.98 m)	215 lb (98 kg)	Fr	Bridgton Academy	Belgrade, Serbia-Montenegro
G	3	Tyler Azzarelli	6 ft 1 in (1.85 m)	175 lb (79 kg)	So	Henry B. Plant HS	Tampa, Florida
G	5	Tom Kaplan	6 ft 5 in (1.96 m)	200 lb (91 kg)	Sr	Alliance HS	Tel Aviv, Israel
F	10	Jason Krayl	6 ft 5 in (1.96 m)	200 lb (91 kg)	Sr	Christian Brothers Academy	Point Pleasant, New Jersey
G	11	Brandon Owens	5 ft 10 in (1.78 m)	160 lb (73 kg)	Jr	St. Thomas More School	Los Angeles, California
C	13	Corey Hallett	6 ft 10 in (2.08 m)	230 lb (104 kg)	RS Fr	Shelburne; Central Michigan	Shelburne, Nova Scotia, Canada
C	15	Brian Boxler	6 ft 11 in (2.11 m)	260 lb (118 kg)	Sr	North Durham HS	Durham, North Carolina
F	15	Brent Stephens	6 ft 6 in (1.98 m)	210 lb (95 kg)	Fr	Jay HS	Jay, Oklahoma
G	20	Tim Warner	6 ft 2 in (1.88 m)	165 lb (75 kg)	Jr	Point Pleasant Beach HS	Point Pleasant Beach, New Jersey
F	23	Marques Alston	6 ft 4 in (1.93 m)	230 lb (104 kg)	Fr	Neptune HS	Neptune, New Jersey
C	24	Troy Hamlett	6 ft 10 in (2.08 m)	180 lb (82 kg)	Jr	Pleasantville HS	Atlantic City, New Jersey
F	31	Blake Hamilton	6 ft 7 in (2.01 m)	225 lb (102 kg)	Jr	Central Dauphin HS	Harrisburg, Pennsylvania
G	33	Dwayne Byfield	6 ft 2 in (1.88 m)	175 lb (79 kg)	Jr	St. Mary's HS	Elmont, New York
G	35	Chris Kenny	6 ft 3 in (1.91 m)	180 lb (82 kg)	So	Christian Brothers Academy	Spring Lake, New Jersey
F	45	Russ Anderson	6 ft 8 in (2.03 m)	215 lb (98 kg)	RS Sr	Don Bosco Prep	Chester, New York
G	22	Ronald Gonzales	5 ft 11 in (1.8 m)	155 lb (70 kg)	RS Fr	Allentown (NJ) HS	Millstone Twp, New Jersey

Head coach

- Dave Calloway

Assistant coach(es)

Legend

- (C) Team captain
- (S) Suspended
- (I) Ineligible
- (W) Walk-on
- Injured
- Current redshirt

Roster

== Schedule and results ==
Date time, TV	Rank^{#}	Opponent^{#}	Result	Record	Site (attendance) city, state
Regular season
Nov 21, 2003*; 6:30 p.m.		vs. Appalachian State; Paradise Jam	W 69–65	1–0	Sports and Fitness Center (1,232); Charlotte Amalie, U.S. Virgin Islands
Nov 23, 2003*; 6:30 p.m.		vs. Boston College; Paradise Jam	L 50–60	1–1	Sports and Fitness Center (1,311); Charlotte Amalie, U.S. Virgin Islands
Nov 24, 2003*; 5:30 p.m.		vs. Hampton; Paradise Jam	W 64–52	2–1	Sports and Fitness Center (2,073); Charlotte Amalie, U.S. Virgin Islands
Nov 29, 2003*; 3:00 p.m.		at Saint Peter's	L 63–76	2–2	Run Baby Run Arena (1,080); Jersey City, New Jersey
Dec 2, 2003*; 7:00 p.m.		at Siena	W 89–76	3–2	MVP Arena (5,000); Albany, New York
Dec 10, 2003*; 7:00 p.m.		Hofstra	W 87–79	4–2	Boylan Gymnasium (2,069); West Long Branch, New Jersey
Dec 13, 2003*; 7:00 p.m.		UMKC	W 82–67	5–2	Boylan Gymnasium (1,927); West Long Branch, New Jersey
Dec 28, 2003*; 4:00 p.m.		Rider	W 64–59	6–2	Boylan Gymnasium (2,228); West Long Branch, New Jersey
Dec 30, 2003*; 7:30 p.m.		at Seton Hall	L 61–88	6–3	Continental Airlines Arena (6,743); East Rutherford, New Jersey
Jan 3, 2004; 7:30 p.m.		Sacred Heart	W 74–61	7–3 (1–0)	Boylan Gymnasium (1,843); West Long Branch, New Jersey
Jan 7, 2004*; 7:00 p.m.		at Princeton	L 52–67	7–4	Jadwin Gymnasium (3,225); Princeton, New Jersey
Jan 10, 2004; 4:00 p.m.		at Wagner	W 70–66	8–4 (2–0)	Spiro Sports Center (1,807); Staten Island, New York
Jan 13, 2004*; 7:00 p.m.		at Rutgers	L 75–78 ^{OT}	8–5	Louis Brown Athletic Center (5,371); Piscataway, New Jersey
Jan 15, 2004; 7:00 p.m.		at St. Francis (NY)	W 72–69	9–5 (3–0)	Generoso Pope Athletic Complex (329); Brooklyn, New York
Jan 17, 2004; 7:00 p.m.		Saint Francis (PA)	W 74–64	10–5 (4–0)	Boylan Gymnasium (2,276); West Long Branch, New Jersey
Jan 19, 2004; 7:00 p.m.		Robert Morris	W 75–67	11–5 (5–0)	Boylan Gymnasium (1,944); West Long Branch, New Jersey
Jan 22, 2004; 7:00 p.m.		at Long Island	L 79–85	11–6 (5–1)	Schwartz Athletic Center (625); Brooklyn, New York
Jan 24, 2004; 7:00 p.m.		at Quinnipiac	L 63–75	11–7 (5–2)	Burt Kahn Court (1,357); Hamden, Connecticut
Jan 31, 2004; 7:00 p.m.		Central Connecticut State	W 78–61	12–7 (6–2)	Boylan Gymnasium (2,368); West Long Branch, New Jersey
Feb 5, 2004; 1:00 a.m.		at Central Connecticut State	L 54–73	12–8 (6–3)	William H. Detrick Gymnasium (1,854); New Britain, Connecticut
Feb 7, 2004; 7:00 p.m.		Quinnipiac	W 89–78	13–8 (7–3)	Boylan Gymnasium (2,331); West Long Branch, New Jersey
Feb 9, 2004; 8:00 p.m.		Fairleigh Dickinson	W 60–58	14–8 (8–3)	Boylan Gymnasium (2,118); West Long Branch, New Jersey
Feb 12, 2004; 7:00 p.m.		Mount St. Mary's	W 57–46	15–8 (9–3)	Boylan Gymnasium (1,964); West Long Branch, New Jersey
Feb 16, 2004; 7:00 p.m.		at Sacred Heart	L 63–70	15–9 (9–4)	William H. Pitt Center (607); Fairfield, Connecticut
Feb 19, 2004; 7:30 p.m.		Long Island	W 63–55	16–9 (10–4)	Boylan Gymnasium (2,029); West Long Branch, New Jersey
Feb 21, 2004; 8:30 p.m.		at Robert Morris	W 68–58	17–9 (11–4)	Charles L. Sewall Center (1,088); Moon Township, Pennsylvania
Feb 23, 2004; 7:00 p.m.		at Fairleigh Dickinson	L 64–86	17–10 (11–5)	Rothman Center (1,023); Hackensack, New Jersey
Feb 27, 2004; 8:00 p.m.		St. Francis (NY)	W 87–82	18–10 (12–5)	Boylan Gymnasium (2,500); West Long Branch, New Jersey
Mar 1, 2004; 7:00 p.m.		at Mount St. Mary's	L 62–68	18–11 (12–6)	Knott Arena (1,758); Emmitsburg, Maryland
NEC tournament
Mar 6, 2004*; 5:30 p.m.	(1)	vs. (8) Mount St. Mary's; Quarterfinals	W 64–52	19–11	Spiro Sports Center (940); Staten Island, New York
Mar 7, 2004*; 1:00 a.m.	(1)	vs. (4) Robert Morris; Semifinals	W 62–45	20–11	Spiro Sports Center (1,118); Staten Island, New York
Mar 10, 2004*; 7:00 p.m., ESPN2	(1)	(7) Central Connecticut State; Championship game	W 67–55	21–11	Boylan Gymnasium (2,500); West Long Branch, New Jersey
NCAA tournament
Mar 19, 2004*; 7:00 p.m.	(15 S)	vs. (2 S) No. 8 Mississippi State; First round	L 52–85	21–12	TD Waterhouse Centre (15,961); Orlando, Florida
*Non-conference game. ^{#}Rankings from AP Poll. (#) Tournament seedings in parentheses. S=South. All times are in Eastern Time.
