= 2003–04 St. Francis Terriers men's basketball team =

American college basketball season

2003–04 St. Francis Terriers men's basketball

NEC Regular Season Champions
- Conference: Northeast Conference
- Record: 15–13 (12–6 NEC)
- Head coach: Ron Ganulin (13th season)
- Assistant coach: Glenn Braica (15th season)
- Home arena: Generoso Pope Athletic Complex

2003–04 Northeast Conference men's basketball standings
	Conf.				Overall
Team	W		L	PCT	W		L	PCT
Monmouth †	12	–	6	.667	21	–	12	.636
St. Francis (NY)	12	–	6	.667	15	–	13	.536
Fairleigh Dickinson	11	–	7	.611	17	–	12	.586
Robert Morris	10	–	8	.556	14	–	15	.483
Saint Francis (PA)	10	–	8	.556	13	–	15	.464
Wagner	10	–	8	.556	13	–	16	.448
Central Connecticut	9	–	9	.500	14	–	14	.500
Mount St. Mary's	8	–	10	.444	10	–	19	.345
Sacred Heart	8	–	10	.444	12	–	15	.444
Quinnipiac	5	–	13	.278	9	–	20	.310
Long Island	4	–	14	.222	8	–	19	.296
† 2004 NEC tournament winner

The 2003–04 St. Francis Terriers men's basketball team represented St. Francis College during the 2003–04 NCAA Division I men's basketball season. The team was coached by Ron Ganulin, who was in his thirteenth year at the helm of the St. Francis Terriers. The Terrier's home games were played at the Generoso Pope Athletic Complex. The team has been a member of the Northeast Conference since 1981.

The Terriers participated in their first NIT Season Tip-Off tournament, losing in the first round to Massachusetts 58–80. The Terriers proceeded to finish the season at 15–13 overall and 12–6 in conference play, to tie for the Conference Regular Season Championship with Monmouth. This is the second Regular Season Championship for the Terriers, the last one coming in the 2000–01 season.

== Roster ==
2003–04 St. Francis Brooklyn Terriers men's basketball team
Players
Coaches

Pos.	#	Name	Height	Weight	Year	Hometown
G	5	John Quintana	6 ft 1 in (1.85 m)	200 lb (91 kg)	Sr	Brooklyn, NY
F	42	Eric Thompson	6 ft 8 in (2.03 m)	215 lb (98 kg)	Sr	Brooklyn, NY
G	00	Mike Wilson	6 ft 2 in (1.88 m)	185 lb (84 kg)	Sr	Naugatuck, CT
G	3	Tory Cavalieri	6 ft 0 in (1.83 m)	180 lb (82 kg)	Jr	Atlantic City, New Jersey
G	1	Sean Dantzler	6 ft 4 in (1.93 m)	180 lb (82 kg)	Jr	Bronx, NY
F	34	Patrice Thevenot	6 ft 6 in (1.98 m)	235 lb (107 kg)	Jr	Brooklyn, NY
G	11	Rob Wiatre	5 ft 11 in (1.8 m)	180 lb (82 kg)	Jr	Brooklyn, NY
F	25	Damien Herard	6 ft 7 in (2.01 m)	225 lb (102 kg)	Jr	Jamaica, NY
F	21	Devon Neckles	6 ft 7 in (2.01 m)	190 lb (86 kg)	So	Brooklyn, NY
G/F	13	Christian Brown	6 ft 4 in (1.93 m)	190 lb (86 kg)	So	Manhattan, NY
G	4	Tom Czaplinski	6 ft 1 in (1.85 m)	180 lb (82 kg)	Fr	Brooklyn, NY
C	50	Brian Franklyn	6 ft 8 in (2.03 m)	240 lb (109 kg)	Fr	Brooklyn, NY

Head coach

- Ron Ganulin (LIU Brooklyn '67)

Assistant coach(es)

- Glenn Braica (Queens College '89)

Legend

- (C) Team captain
- (S) Suspended
- (I) Ineligible
- (W) Walk-on
- Injured
- Current redshirt

== Schedule and results ==
Date time, TV	Opponent	Result	Record	Site (attendance) city, state
Regular season
November 18, 2003*; 7:00 pm	at UMass; NIT Season Tip-Off	L 58–80	0–1	Mullins Center (2,089); Amherst, MA
November 28, 2003*; 6:00 pm	vs. William & Mary	L 60–80	0–2	Charles E. Smith Center (2,172); Washington, DC
November 29, 2003*; 6:00 pm	vs. Appalachian State	W 68–63	1–2	Charles E. Smith Center (1,672); Washington, DC
December 3, 2003*; 8:00 pm	Saint Peter's	L 68–78	1–3	Generoso Pope Athletic Complex (785); Brooklyn, NY
December 9, 2003*; 7:30 pm	at St. John's (NY)	L 52–58	1–4	Carnesecca Arena (4,014); Queens, NY
December 17, 2003*; 7:00 pm	Binghamton	L 53–61	1–5	Generoso Pope Athletic Complex (308); Brooklyn, NY
December 20, 2003*; 8:00 pm	at Penn State	L 64–68	1–6	Bryce Jordan Center (5,021); State College, PA
December 23, 2003; 7:00 pm	at Mount St. Mary's	W 75–66	2–6 (1–0)	Generoso Pope Athletic Complex (341); Brooklyn, NY
December 29, 2003*; 7:00 pm	Cornell	W 78–76 ^{OT}	3–6	Generoso Pope Athletic Complex (352); Brooklyn, NY
January 3, 2004; 12:00 pm	vs. Quinnipiac	W 74–69	4–6 (2–0)	Madison Square Garden (1,500); New York, NY
January 6, 2004*; 7:00 pm	at Army	W 68–54	5–6	Christl Arena (352); West Point, NY
January 10, 2004; 7:00 pm	at Saint Francis (PA)	L 65–74	5–7 (2–1)	DeGol Arena (1,438); Loretto, PA
January 12, 2004; 7:30 pm	at Robert Morris	W 74–58	6–7 (3–1)	Charles L. Sewall Center (578); Moon Township, PA
January 15, 2004; 7:00 pm	Monmouth	L 69–72	6–8 (3–2)	Generoso Pope Athletic Complex (329); Brooklyn, NY
January 17, 2004; 2:00 pm	at Central Connecticut State	W 69–57	7–8 (4–2)	William H. Detrick Gymnasium (1,829); New Britain, CT
January 22, 2004; 7:00 pm	at Fairleigh Dickinson	W 81–72	8–8 (5–2)	Rothman Center (763); Hackensack, NJ
January 24, 2004; 1:30 pm	at Wagner	W 82–70	9–8 (6–2)	Spiro Sports Center (2,036); Staten Island, NY
January 29, 2004; 8:00 pm	Sacred Heart	W 86–78	10–8 (7–2)	Generoso Pope Athletic Complex (619); Brooklyn, NY
January 31, 2004; 4:00 pm	Robert Morris	W 79–66	11–8 (8–2)	Generoso Pope Athletic Complex (540); Brooklyn, NY
February 2, 2004; 7:00 pm	Saint Francis (PA)	W 84–54	12–8 (9–2)	Generoso Pope Athletic Complex (302); Brooklyn, NY
February 7, 2004; 7:00 pm	at Mount St. Mary's	L 64–78	12–9 (9–3)	Knott Arena (2,323); Emmitsburg, MD
February 14, 2004; 4:00 pm	Wagner	L 70–74	12–10 (9–4)	Generoso Pope Athletic Complex (538); Brooklyn, NY
February 19, 2004; 7:00 pm	at Sacred Heart	W 93–79	13–10 (10–4)	William H. Pitt Center (868); Fairfield, CT
February 21, 2004; 4:00 pm	at Long Island	L 75–78	13–11 (10–5)	Schwartz Athletic Center (835); Brooklyn, NY
February 24, 2004; 8:00 pm	Long Island; Battle of Brooklyn	W 75–66	14–11 (11–5)	Generoso Pope Athletic Complex (521); Brooklyn, NY
February 27, 2004; 8:00 pm	at Monmouth	L 82–87	14–12 (11–6)	William T. Boylan Gymnasium (2,500); West Long Branch, NJ
March 1, 2004; 8:00 pm	Fairleigh Dickinson	W 63–57	15–12 (12–6)	Generoso Pope Athletic Complex (503); Brooklyn, NY
2004 NEC tournament
March 6, 2004; 12:00 pm	vs. Central Connecticut State; Quarterfinals	L 68–81	15–13	Spiro Sports Center (1,831); Staten Island, NY
*Non-conference game. ^{#}Rankings from AP Poll. (#) Tournament seedings in parentheses.
