= 2002 Northeast Conference men's basketball tournament =

- Classification: Division I
- Season: 2001–02
- Teams: 8
- Site: Spiro Sports Center; Staten Island, NY
- Finals site: William H. Detrick Gymnasium; New Britain, CT
- Champions: Central Connecticut (2nd title)
- Winning coach: Howie Dickenman (2nd title)
- MVP: Damian Battles (Central Connecticut)

2001–02 Northeast Conference men's basketball standings
	Conf.				Overall
Team	W		L	PCT	W		L	PCT
Central Connecticut †	19	–	1	.950	27	–	5	.844
Wagner	15	–	5	.750	19	–	10	.655
UMBC	15	–	5	.750	20	–	9	.690
Monmouth	14	–	6	.700	18	–	12	.600
St. Francis (NY)	13	–	7	.650	18	–	11	.621
Robert Morris	11	–	9	.550	12	–	18	.400
Quinnipiac	10	–	10	.500	14	–	16	.467
Sacred Heart	7	–	13	.350	8	–	20	.286
Saint Francis (PA)	5	–	15	.250	6	–	21	.222
Long Island	5	–	15	.250	5	–	22	.185
Fairleigh Dickinson	4	–	16	.200	4	–	25	.138
Mount St. Mary's	2	–	18	.100	3	–	24	.111
† 2002 NEC tournament winner

The 2002 Northeast Conference men's basketball tournament was held in March. The tournament featured the league's top eight seeds. Central Connecticut won the championship, its second, and received the conference's automatic bid to the 2002 NCAA Tournament.

== Format ==
The NEC Men’s Basketball Tournament consisted of an eight-team playoff format with the quarterfinal and semifinal games played at the Spiro Sports Center in Staten Island, NY. The Championship game was played at the court of the highest remaining seed, Central Connecticut.

== Bracket ==
Quarterfinals; Spiro Sports Center
1	Central Connecticut	66
8	Sacred Heart	54
4	Monmouth	61
5	St. Francis (NY)	71
2	Wagner	78
7	Quinnipiac	87
3	UMBC	85
6	Robert Morris	76

Semifinals; Spiro Sports Center
1	Central Connecticut	58
5	St. Francis (NY)	54
7	Quinnipiac	75
3	UMBC	72

Championship Game; William H. Detrick Gymnasium
1	Central Connecticut	78
7	Quinnipiac	71

== All-tournament team ==
Tournament MVP in bold.

**2002 NEC All-Tournament Team**

**Damian Battles**, CCSU
Rob Monroe, QU
Peter Mulligan, UMBC
Ron Robinson, CCSU
Bill Romano, QU
