= 2006–07 Central Connecticut Blue Devils men's basketball team =

American college basketball season

2006–07 Central Connecticut Blue Devils men's basketball
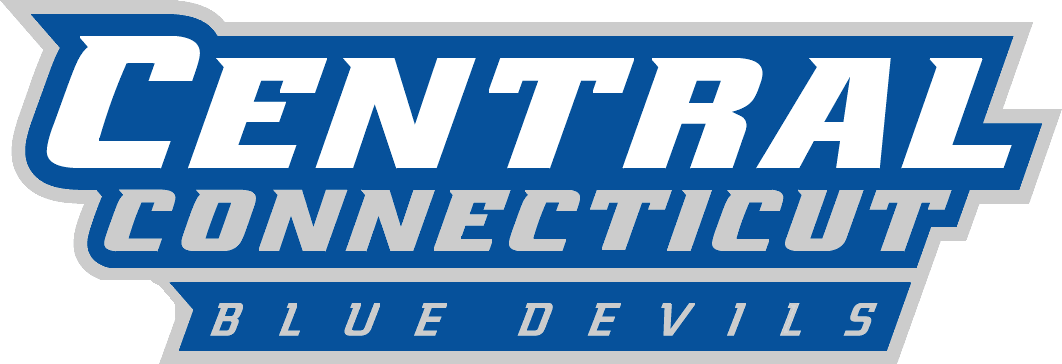

NEC tournament champions NEC Regular season champions

NCAA tournament
- Conference: Northeast Conference
- Record: 22–12 (16–2 NEC)
- Head coach: Howie Dickenman (11th season)
- Home arena: William H. Detrick Gymnasium

2006–07 Northeast Conference men's basketball standings
	Conf.				Overall
Team	W		L	PCT	W		L	PCT
Central Connecticut †	16	–	2	.889	22	–	12	.647
Sacred Heart	12	–	6	.667	18	–	14	.563
Quinnipiac	11	–	7	.611	14	–	15	.483
Robert Morris	9	–	9	.500	17	–	11	.607
Mount St. Mary's	9	–	9	.500	11	–	20	.355
Fairleigh Dickinson	9	–	9	.500	14	–	16	.467
Wagner	8	–	10	.444	11	–	19	.367
St. Francis (NY)	7	–	11	.389	9	–	22	.290
Monmouth	7	–	11	.389	12	–	18	.400
Long Island	6	–	12	.333	10	–	19	.345
Saint Francis (PA)	5	–	13	.278	8	–	21	.276
† 2007 NEC tournament winner

The 2006–07 Central Connecticut Blue Devils men's basketball team represented Central Connecticut State University during the 2006–07 NCAA Division I men's basketball season. The Blue Devils were led by 11th-year head coach Howie Dickenman, and played their home games at the William H. Detrick Gymnasium in New Britain, Connecticut as members of the Northeast Conference. After finishing atop the conference regular season standings, the Blue Devils also won the Northeast Conference tournament to receive the conference's automatic bid to the NCAA Division I men's tournament. A No. 16 seed in the South region, Central Connecticut fell to No. 1 seed Ohio State, 78–57, to finish the season with a record of 22–12 (16–2 NEC).

== Roster ==
2006–07 Central Connecticut Blue Devils men's basketball team
Players
Coaches

Pos.	#	Name	Height	Weight	Year	Hometown
F	5	Obie Nwadike	6 ft 4 in (1.93 m)	224 lb (102 kg)	Sr	Jersey City, New Jersey
F	22	Jemino Sobers	6 ft 7 in (2.01 m)	245 lb (111 kg)	Sr
G	35	Tristan Blackwood	6 ft 0 in (1.83 m)	175 lb (79 kg)	Jr	Toronto, Ontario
G	44	Javier Mojica	6 ft 3 in (1.91 m)	180 lb (82 kg)	Sr	Auburn, Massachusetts

Head coach

- Howie Dickenman (Central Connecticut State)

Assistant coach(es)

Legend

- (C) Team captain
- (S) Suspended
- (I) Ineligible
- (W) Walk-on
- Injured
- Current redshirt

Roster

== Schedule and results ==
Date time, TV	Rank^{#}	Opponent^{#}	Result	Record	Site (attendance) city, state
Regular season
Nov 10, 2006*		at Michigan; John Thompson Foundation Challenge	L 40–60	0–1	Crisler Arena (8,426); Ann Arbor, Michigan
Nov 11, 2006*		vs. Eastern Michigan; John Thompson Foundation Challenge	L 69–76	0–2	Crisler Arena (8,762); Ann Arbor, Michigan
Nov 12, 2006*		vs. Davidson; John Thompson Foundation Challenge	L 69–76	0–3	Crisler Arena (8,958); Ann Arbor, Michigan
Dec 9, 2006*		UMass	L 66–79	3–6	Mohegan Sun Arena (3,064); Uncasville, Connecticut
Dec 14, 2006*		Harvard	L 65–72	3–7	William H. Detrick Gymnasium (1,298); New Britain, Connecticut
Dec 16, 2006*		La Salle	L 73–86	3–8	William H. Detrick Gymnasium (1,154); New Britain, Connecticut
Dec 30, 2006*		at UMBC	L 52–66		Retriever Activities Center (1,422); Catonsville, MD
NEC Tournament
Mar 1, 2007*		St. Francis (NY); Quarterfinals	W 79–61	20–11	William H. Detrick Gymnasium (2,974); New Britain, Connecticut
Mar 4, 2007*		Mount St. Mary's; Semifinals	W 74–68	21–11	William H. Detrick Gymnasium (3,164); New Britain, Connecticut
Mar 7, 2007*		Sacred Heart; Championship game	W 74–70	22–11	William H. Detrick Gymnasium (3,210); New Britain, Connecticut
NCAA Tournament
Mar 15, 2007*; CBS	(16 S)	vs. (1 S) No. 1 Ohio State; First Round	L 57–78	22–12	Rupp Arena (20,752); Lexington, Kentucky
*Non-conference game. ^{#}Rankings from AP Poll. (#) Tournament seedings in parentheses. S=South. All times are in Eastern.
