= 1999–2000 St. Francis Terriers men's basketball team =

American college basketball season

1999–2000 St. Francis Terriers men's basketball
- Conference: Northeast Conference
- Record: 18–12 (12–6 NEC)
- Head coach: Ron Ganulin (9th season)
- Assistant coaches: Glenn Braica (11th season); Ed Custodio (2nd season)
- Home arena: Generoso Pope Athletic Complex

1999–2000 Northeast Conference men's basketball standings
	Conf.				Overall
Team	W		L	PCT	W		L	PCT
Central Connecticut †	15	–	3	.833	25	–	6	.806
Fairleigh Dickinson	13	–	5	.722	17	–	11	.607
Robert Morris	13	–	5	.722	18	–	12	.600
St. Francis Brooklyn	12	–	6	.667	18	–	12	.600
Quinnipiac	12	–	6	.667	18	–	10	.643
Monmouth	9	–	9	.500	12	–	16	.429
Saint Francis (PA)	7	–	11	.389	10	–	18	.357
Mount St. Mary's	7	–	11	.389	9	–	20	.310
UMBC	7	–	11	.389	11	–	18	.379
Wagner	6	–	12	.333	11	–	16	.407
Long Island	5	–	13	.278	8	–	19	.296
Sacred Heart	2	–	16	.111	3	–	25	.107
† 2000 NEC tournament winner

The 1999–2000 St. Francis Terriers men's basketball team represented St. Francis College during the 1999–2000 NCAA Division I men's basketball season. The team was coached by Ron Ganulin, who was in his ninth year at the helm of the St. Francis Terriers. The Terrier's home games were played at the Generoso Pope Athletic Complex. The team has been a member of the Northeast Conference since 1981.

The Terriers finished the season at 18–12 overall and 12–6 in conference play.

== Roster ==
1999–2000 St. Francis Brooklyn Terriers men's basketball team
Players
Coaches

Pos.	#	Name	Height	Weight	Year	Hometown
F	44	Marcel Dimbeng	6 ft 7 in (2.01 m)	235 lb (107 kg)	Sr	Douala, Cameroon
F	13	Priit Ilver	6 ft 8 in (2.03 m)	225 lb (102 kg)	Sr	Tallinn, Estonia
F	42	Gerald Walker	6 ft 7 in (2.01 m)	215 lb (98 kg)	Sr	Pittsburgh, Pennsylvania
F	24	Angel Santana	6 ft 7 in (2.01 m)	210 lb (95 kg)	Sr	Las Palmas, Spain
F	34	Henry Lalane	6 ft 6 in (1.98 m)	190 lb (86 kg)	Sr	Vista, California
C	40	Heberth Reyes	6 ft 11 in (2.11 m)	245 lb (111 kg)	Jr	San Antonio, Venezuela
G	33	Richy Dominguez	6 ft 5 in (1.96 m)	195 lb (88 kg)	Jr	Chocó, Colombia
G	3	Greg Nunn	5 ft 10 in (1.78 m)	180 lb (82 kg)	Jr	Inwood, New York
G	11	Jamel Smiley	5 ft 11 in (1.8 m)	185 lb (84 kg)	Jr	West Hempstead, New York
G	32	Steven Howard	6 ft 4 in (1.93 m)	205 lb (93 kg)	Jr	Watertown, New York
G	40	Jim Jean-Pierre	6 ft 4 in (1.93 m)	215 lb (98 kg)	Jr	Brooklyn, New York
G	3	Cory Underwood	6 ft 9 in (2.06 m)	210 lb (95 kg)	Fr	East Elmhurst, New York
G	12	Timothy Rollerson	5 ft 9 in (1.75 m)	160 lb (73 kg)	Fr	Mount Vernon, New York

Head coach

- Ron Ganulin (LIU Brooklyn '67)

Assistant coach(es)

- Glenn Braica (Queens College '89)
- Ed Custodio (St. Francis College '98)

Legend

- (C) Team captain
- (S) Suspended
- (I) Ineligible
- (W) Walk-on
- Injured
- Current redshirt

== Schedule and results ==
Date time, TV	Opponent	Result	Record	Site city, state
Regular season
November 20, 1999*	vs. Stony Brook	W 90–73	1–0	Binghamton University Events Center; Vestal, NY
November 21, 1999*	vs. Duquesne	W 64–63	2–0	Binghamton University Events Center; Vestal, NY
November 27, 1999*	Queens (NY)	W 95–73	3–0	Generoso Pope Athletic Complex; Brooklyn, NY
December 8, 1999*	at St. John's (NY)	L 66–88	3–1	Carnesecca Arena; Queens, NY
December 11, 1999*	at Boston College	L 66–72	3–2	Conte Forum; Chestnut Hill, MA
December 14, 1999*	at Florida International	L 76–95	3–3	U.S. Century Bank Arena; Miami, FL
December 20, 1999*	Yale	W 79–64	4–3	Generoso Pope Athletic Complex; Brooklyn, NY
December 23, 1999*	Iona	W 100–98 ^{OT}	5–3	Generoso Pope Athletic Complex; Brooklyn, NY
December 27, 1999*	at Cal State Northridge	L 79–88	5–4	Matadome; Northridge, CA
December 27, 1999*	at California-Irvine	L 57–67	5–5	Bren Events Center; Irvine, CA
January 8, 2000	at Saint Francis (PA)	W 84–65	6–5 (1–0)	DeGol Arena; Loretto, PA
January 10, 2000	at Robert Morris	L 63–73	6–6 (1–1)	Charles L. Sewall Center; Moon Township, PA
January 13, 2000	Central Connecticut State	W 83–79	6–7 (1–2)	Generoso Pope Athletic Complex; Brooklyn, NY
January 15, 2000	Quinnipiac	L 78–81	6–8 (1–3)	Generoso Pope Athletic Complex; Brooklyn, NY
January 19, 2000	at Long Island; Battle of Brooklyn	W 66–63	7–8 (2–3)	Schwartz Athletic Center; Brooklyn, NY
January 22, 2000	Monmouth	W 73–67	8–8 (3–3)	Generoso Pope Athletic Complex; Brooklyn, NY
January 24, 2000	Fairleigh Dickinson	W 68–52	9–8 (4–3)	Generoso Pope Athletic Complex; Brooklyn, NY
January 29, 2000	at Sacred Heart	W 86–78	10–8 (5–3)	William H. Pitt Center; Fairfield, CT
January 31, 2000	Wagner	W 93–90	11–8 (6–3)	Generoso Pope Athletic Complex; Brooklyn, NY
February 3, 2000	at Wagner	W 78–71	12–8 (7–3)	Spiro Sports Center; Staten Island, NY
February 10, 2000	at Mount St. Mary's	W 80–69	13–8 (8–3)	Knott Arena; Emmitsburg, MD
February 12, 2000	at UMBC	W 77–64	14–8 (9–3)	Retriever Activities Center; Baltimore, MD
February 14, 2000	Sacred Heart	W 82–67	15–8 (10–3)	Generoso Pope Athletic Complex; Brooklyn, NY
February 17, 2000	at Fairleigh Dickinson	L 64–81	15–9 (10–4)	Rothman Center; Hackensack, NJ
February 19, 2000	at Monmouth	W 82–70	16–9 (11–4)	William T. Boylan Gymnasium; West Long Branch, NJ
February 22, 2000	Long Island	L 76–78	16–10 (11–5)	Generoso Pope Athletic Complex; Brooklyn, NY
February 24, 2000	Robert Morris	L 92–97	16–11 (11–6)	Generoso Pope Athletic Complex; Brooklyn, NY
February 26, 2000	Saint Francis (PA)	W 73–68	17–11 (12–6)	Generoso Pope Athletic Complex; Brooklyn, NY
2000 NEC tournament
March 3, 2000	vs. Fairleigh Dickinson; Quarterfinals	W 86–70	18–11	Sun National Bank Center; Trenton, NJ
March 4, 2000	vs. Mount St. Mary's; Semifinals	L 73–83	18–12	Sun National Bank Center; Trenton, NJ
*Non-conference game. ^{#}Rankings from AP Poll. (#) Tournament seedings in parentheses.
