= 2006–07 St. Francis Terriers men's basketball team =

American college basketball season

2006–07 St. Francis Terriers men's basketball
- Conference: Northeast Conference
- Record: 9–22 (7–11 NEC)
- Head coach: Brian Nash (2nd season)
- Assistant coaches: Jim Datka (2nd season); Allen Griffin (2nd season); Michael Netti (1st season)
- Home arena: Generoso Pope Athletic Complex

2006–07 Northeast Conference men's basketball standings
	Conf.				Overall
Team	W		L	PCT	W		L	PCT
Central Connecticut †	16	–	2	.889	22	–	12	.647
Sacred Heart	12	–	6	.667	18	–	14	.563
Quinnipiac	11	–	7	.611	14	–	15	.483
Robert Morris	9	–	9	.500	17	–	11	.607
Mount St. Mary's	9	–	9	.500	11	–	20	.355
Fairleigh Dickinson	9	–	9	.500	14	–	16	.467
Wagner	8	–	10	.444	11	–	19	.367
St. Francis (NY)	7	–	11	.389	9	–	22	.290
Monmouth	7	–	11	.389	12	–	18	.400
Long Island	6	–	12	.333	10	–	19	.345
Saint Francis (PA)	5	–	13	.278	8	–	21	.276
† 2007 NEC tournament winner

The 2006–07 St. Francis Terriers men's basketball team represented St. Francis College during the 2006–07 NCAA Division I men's basketball season. The team was coached by Brian Nash, who was in his second year at the helm of the St. Francis Terriers. The Terrier's home games were played at the Generoso Pope Athletic Complex. The team has been a member of the Northeast Conference since 1981.

Nash's team finished at 9–22 overall and 7–11 in conference play for an 8th-place finish.

== Roster ==
2006–07 St. Francis Brooklyn Terriers men's basketball team
Players
Coaches

Pos.	#	Name	Height	Weight	Year	Hometown
G	14	Ruandy Melo	6 ft 0 in (1.83 m)	160 lb (73 kg)	Sr	Manhattan, NY
G/F	15	Allan Sheppard	6 ft 5 in (1.96 m)	200 lb (91 kg)	Sr	Manhattan, NY
F	10	Sami Pekkola	6 ft 7 in (2.01 m)	220 lb (100 kg)	Jr	Lahti, Finland
F	40	James St. Robert	6 ft 8 in (2.03 m)	230 lb (104 kg)	Jr	Copiague, NY
F	12	Robert Hines	6 ft 5 in (1.96 m)	250 lb (113 kg)	Jr	Trenton, NJ
G	5	Marcus Williams	6 ft 3 in (1.91 m)	220 lb (100 kg)	Jr	Jersey City, NJ
F	20	Bassith Yessoufou	6 ft 9 in (2.06 m)	218 lb (99 kg)	Jr	San Luis Obispo, CA
G	2	Otis Campbell	6 ft 2 in (1.88 m)	215 lb (98 kg)	Jr	Jersey City, NJ
G	3	Jamaal Womack (C)	5 ft 8 in (1.73 m)	170 lb (77 kg)	So	Bronx, NY
F	44	John Gooden	6 ft 6 in (1.98 m)	220 lb (100 kg)	So	Bronx, NY
G/F	32	Kayode Ayeni	6 ft 5 in (1.96 m)	180 lb (82 kg)	Fr	Brooklyn, NY
F	1	Rainier Rickards	6 ft 5 in (1.96 m)	195 lb (88 kg)	Fr	Queens, NY
G	34	Carl Palmer	6 ft 4 in (1.93 m)	185 lb (84 kg)	Fr	Brooklyn, NY
F	21	David Burton	6 ft 5 in (1.96 m)	220 lb (100 kg)	Fr	Philadelphia, PA

Head coach

- Brian Nash (Keene State '92)

Assistant coach(es)

- Jim Datka (Wisconsin Lutheran '88)

Legend

- (C) Team captain
- (S) Suspended
- (I) Ineligible
- (W) Walk-on
- Injured
- Current redshirt

== Schedule and results ==
Date time, TV	Opponent	Result	Record	Site (attendance) city, state
Regular season
November 10, 2006*; 8:00 pm	at No. 20 Syracuse; Black Coaches Association Invitational	L 51–83	0–1	Carrier Dome (18,280); Syracuse, NY
November 11, 2006*; 4:30 pm	vs. UTEP; Black Coaches Association Invitational	L 52–54	0–2	Carrier Dome; Syracuse, NY
November 12, 2006*; 3:30 pm	vs. Penn; Black Coaches Association Invitational	L 56–86	0–3	Carrier Dome; Syracuse, NY
November 18, 2006*; 4:00 pm	Maine	L 60–79	0–4	Generoso Pope Athletic Complex (219); Brooklyn, NY
November 22, 2006*; 7:00 pm	at UMass	L 49–63	0–5	Mullins Center (5,528); Amherst, MA
November 26, 2006*; 1:00 pm	at Fordham	L 49–76	0–6	Rose Hill Gym (1,721); Bronx, NY
November 29, 2006; 7:00 pm	at Central Connecticut State	L 64–77	0–7 (0–1)	William H. Detrick Gymnasium (1,208); New Britain, CT
December 2, 2006*; 7:00 pm	at Fairfield	L 64–68 ^{OT}	0–8	Webster Bank Arena (2,479); Bridgeport, CT
December 5, 2006*; 7:30 pm	at St. John's (NY)	L 42–59	0–9	Carnesecca Arena (3,752); Queens, NY
December 7, 2006; 7:00 pm	Saint Francis (PA)	L 50–54	0–10 (0–2)	Generoso Pope Athletic Complex (229); Brooklyn, NY
December 12, 2006*; 8:00 pm	at Hofstra	L 64–67	0–11	David S. Mack Sports and Exhibition Complex (3,031); Hempstead, NY
December 17, 2006*; 2:00 pm	at Hartford	L 52–58	0–12	Chase Arena at Reich Family Pavilion (721); Hartford, CT
December 21, 2006*; 7:00 pm	Manhattan	W 76–73 ^{OT}	1–12	Generoso Pope Athletic Complex (648); Brooklyn, NY
December 30, 2006*; 7:00 pm	Columbia	W 67–58	2–12	Generoso Pope Athletic Complex (277); Brooklyn, NY
January 6, 2007; 4:00 pm	Sacred Heart	L 58–63	2–13 (0–3)	Generoso Pope Athletic Complex (243); Brooklyn, NY
January 8, 2007; 7:30 pm	at Long Island	W 68–52	3–13 (1–3)	Wellness, Recreation & Athletics Center (765); Brooklyn, NY
January 11, 2007; 7:00 pm	at Mount St. Mary's	L 54–72	3–14 (1–4)	Knott Arena (602); Emmitsburg, MD
January 13, 2007; 2:00 pm	Wagner	L 66–73	3–15 (1–5)	Generoso Pope Athletic Complex (216); Brooklyn, NY
January 18, 2007; 7:00 pm	at Quinnipiac	L 72–74	3–16 (1–6)	Burt Kahn Court (1,714); Hamden, CT
January 20, 2007; 2:00 pm	at Wagner	W 66–51	4–16 (2–6)	Spiro Sports Center (1,178); Staten Island, NY
January 22, 2007; 4:00 pm	Monmouth	W 69–57	5–16 (3–6)	Generoso Pope Athletic Complex (226); Brooklyn, NY
January 25, 2007; 7:00 pm	Central Connecticut State	L 61–69	5–17 (3–7)	Generoso Pope Athletic Complex (289); Brooklyn, NY
February 1, 2007; 7:00 pm	Quinnipiac	L 70–73 ^{OT}	5–18 (3–8)	Generoso Pope Athletic Complex (273); Brooklyn, NY
February 3, 2007; 7:00 pm	at Monmouth	L 60–69	5–19 (3–9)	William T. Boylan Gymnasium (2,010); West Long Branch, NJ
February 9, 2007; 7:30 pm	at Fairleigh Dickinson	W 71–69	6–19 (4–9)	Rothman Center (1,574); Hackensack, NJ
February 11, 2007; 4:00 pm	Long Island; Battle of Brooklyn	L 79–82 ^{OT}	6–20 (4–10)	Generoso Pope Athletic Complex (426); Brooklyn, NY
February 15, 2007; 8:00 pm	at Saint Francis (PA)	L 74–81	6–21 (4–11)	DeGol Arena (1,426); Loretto, PA
February 17, 2007; 7:00 pm	at Robert Morris	W 102–97 ^{2OT}	7–21 (5–11)	Charles L. Sewall Center (1,237); Moon Township, PA
February 24, 2007; 4:00 pm	Mount St. Mary's	W 56–55	8–21 (6–11)	Generoso Pope Athletic Complex (189); Brooklyn, NY
February 26, 2007; 7:00 pm	Fairleigh Dickinson	W 72–69	9–21 (7–11)	Generoso Pope Athletic Complex (329); Brooklyn, NY
2007 NEC tournament
March 1, 2007; 7:00 pm	at Central Connecticut State; Quarterfinals	L 61–79	9–22	William H. Detrick Gymnasium (2,974); New Britain, CT
*Non-conference game. ^{#}Rankings from AP Poll. (#) Tournament seedings in parentheses.
