= 2001–02 St. Francis Terriers men's basketball team =

American college basketball season

2001–02 St. Francis Terriers men's basketball
- Conference: Northeast Conference
- Record: 18–11 (13–7 NEC)
- Head coach: Ron Ganulin (11th season)
- Assistant coaches: Glenn Braica (13th season); Ed Custodio (4th season)
- Home arena: Generoso Pope Athletic Complex

2001–02 Northeast Conference men's basketball standings
	Conf.				Overall
Team	W		L	PCT	W		L	PCT
Central Connecticut †	19	–	1	.950	27	–	5	.844
Wagner	15	–	5	.750	19	–	10	.655
UMBC	15	–	5	.750	20	–	9	.690
Monmouth	14	–	6	.700	18	–	12	.600
St. Francis (NY)	13	–	7	.650	18	–	11	.621
Robert Morris	11	–	9	.550	12	–	18	.400
Quinnipiac	10	–	10	.500	14	–	16	.467
Sacred Heart	7	–	13	.350	8	–	20	.286
Saint Francis (PA)	5	–	15	.250	6	–	21	.222
Long Island	5	–	15	.250	5	–	22	.185
Fairleigh Dickinson	4	–	16	.200	4	–	25	.138
Mount St. Mary's	2	–	18	.100	3	–	24	.111
† 2002 NEC tournament winner

Wordmark logo for St. Francis Brooklyn Terriers athletics in NCAA Division I.

The 2001–02 St. Francis Terriers men's basketball team represented St. Francis College during the 2001–02 NCAA Division I men's basketball season. The team was coached by Ron Ganulin, who was in his eleventh year at the helm of the St. Francis Terriers. The Terrier's home games were played at the Generoso Pope Athletic Complex. The team has been a member of the Northeast Conference since 1981.

The Terriers finished the season at 18–11 overall and 13–7 in conference play. They won in the NEC quarterfinals against Monmouth, 71–61, and lost to Central Connecticut State in the semifinals, 54–58.

Against Central Connecticut on December 3, 2001, Bronski Dockery shot 100% from the three-point line, going 7 for 7, which is tied for the NCAA record.

== Roster ==
2001–02 St. Francis Brooklyn Terriers men's basketball team
Players
Coaches

Pos.	#	Name	Height	Weight	Year	Hometown
G	12	Karl Sanders	5 ft 9 in (1.75 m)	180 lb (82 kg)	Sr	Brooklyn, New York
G	3	Jason Morgan	6 ft 4 in (1.93 m)	190 lb (86 kg)	Sr	Willingboro, New Jersey
F	23	Clifford Strong	6 ft 8 in (2.03 m)	220 lb (100 kg)	Jr	Brooklyn, New York
F/C	13	Paul Kowalczuk	6 ft 10 in (2.08 m)	225 lb (102 kg)	Jr	Koszalin, Poland
F	42	Eric Thompson	6 ft 8 in (2.03 m)	215 lb (98 kg)	So	Brooklyn, New York
G	15	Bronski Dockery	6 ft 2 in (1.88 m)	190 lb (86 kg)	Fr	Manhattan, New York
G	40	Omar Hatcher	6 ft 2 in (1.88 m)	185 lb (84 kg)	Fr	Philadelphia, Pennsylvania
F	25	Damien Herard	6 ft 7 in (2.01 m)	225 lb (102 kg)	Fr	Jamaica, New York
F	44	Christopher Sockwell	6 ft 8 in (2.03 m)	240 lb (109 kg)	Fr	Brooklyn, New York
G	11	Rob Wiatre	6 ft 0 in (1.83 m)	180 lb (82 kg)	Fr	Brooklyn, New York

Head coach

- Ron Ganulin (LIU Brooklyn '67)

Assistant coach(es)

- Glenn Braica (Queens College '89)
- Ed Custodio (St. Francis College '98)

Legend

- (C) Team captain
- (S) Suspended
- (I) Ineligible
- (W) Walk-on
- Injured
- Current redshirt

== Schedule and results ==
Date time, TV	Opponent	Result	Record	Site (attendance) city, state
Regular season
November 16, 2001*; 7:00 pm	Lehigh	W 100–91	1–0	Generoso Pope Athletic Complex (619); Brooklyn, NY
November 21, 2001*; 7:00 pm	Saint Peter's	W 90–83	2–0	Generoso Pope Athletic Complex (348); Brooklyn, NY
November 24, 2001*; 2:00 pm	Howard	W 85–72	3–0	Generoso Pope Athletic Complex (394); Brooklyn, NY
December 1, 2001; 2:00 pm	at Quinnipiac	W 75–71	4–0 (1–0)	Burt Kahn Court (1,000); Hamden, CT
December 3, 2001; 7:00 pm	at Central Connecticut State	W 82–69	5–0 (2–0)	William H. Detrick Gymnasium (2,120); New Britain, CT
December 11, 2001*; 7:30 pm	at Fairfield	L 71–75	5–1	Alumni Hall (2,038); Fairfield, CT
December 20, 2001*; 7:30 pm	at St. John's	L 82–89	5–2	Carnesecca Arena (6,008); Queens, NY
December 29, 2001*; 4:00 pm	at Pittsburgh	L 61–74	5–3	Fitzgerald Field House (5,519); Pittsburgh, PA
January 4, 2002; 7:00 pm	Fairleigh Dickinson	W 75–66	6–3 (3–0)	Generoso Pope Athletic Complex (374); Brooklyn, NY
January 6, 2002; 2:00 pm	Monmouth	L 71–86	6–4 (3–1)	Generoso Pope Athletic Complex (327); Brooklyn, NY
January 10, 2002; 7:30 pm	at Robert Morris	L 80–93	6–5 (3–2)	Charles L. Sewall Center (614); Moon Township, PA
January 12, 2002; 7:00 pm	at Saint Francis (PA)	W 64–62	7–5 (4–2)	DeGol Arena (883); Loretto, PA
January 16, 2002; 7:30 pm	at Mount St. Mary's	W 85–73	8–5 (5–2)	Knott Arena (1,385); Emmitsburg, MD
January 19, 2002; 4:00 pm	Quinnipiac	W 112–102	9–5 (6–2)	Generoso Pope Athletic Complex (408); Brooklyn, NY
January 23, 2002; 7:00 pm	Long Island	W 92–84	10–5 (7–2)	Generoso Pope Athletic Complex (769); Brooklyn, NY
January 26, 2002; 2:00 pm	Robert Morris	W 91–78	11–5 (8–2)	Generoso Pope Athletic Complex (372); Brooklyn, NY
January 28, 2002; 7:00 pm	Saint Francis (PA)	W 79–66	12–5 (9–2)	Generoso Pope Athletic Complex (313); Brooklyn, NY
February 2, 2002; 12:00 pm	at Fairleigh Dickinson	W 86–76	13–5 (10–2)	Rothman Center (757); Hackensack, NJ
February 4, 2002; 7:00 pm	UMBC	L 67–78	13–6 (10–3)	Generoso Pope Athletic Complex (493); Brooklyn, NY
February 9, 2002; 2:00 pm	Sacred Heart	W 77–76	14–6 (11–3)	Generoso Pope Athletic Complex (314); Brooklyn, NY
February 11, 2002; 7:30 pm	at Wagner	L 88–99	14–7 (11–4)	Spiro Sports Center (2,219); Staten Island, NY
February 14, 2002; 7:00 pm	Mount St. Mary's	W 85–60	15–7 (12–4)	Generoso Pope Athletic Complex (204); Brooklyn, NY
February 16, 2002; 4:00 pm	at Sacred Heart	L 86–94	15–8 (12–5)	Nassau Veterans Memorial Coliseum (750); Uniondale, NY
February 20, 2002; 7:00 pm	Wagner	L 71–83	15–9 (12–6)	Generoso Pope Athletic Complex (635); Brooklyn, NY
February 21, 2002*; 8:00 pm	Binghamton	W 71–67	16–9	Generoso Pope Athletic Complex (574); Brooklyn, NY
February 23, 2002; 7:00 pm	at Monmouth	L 68–75	16–10 (12–7)	William T. Boylan Gymnasium (2,194); West Long Branch, NJ
February 25, 2002; 7:00 pm	at Long Island; Battle of Brooklyn	W 108–94 ^{OT}	17–10 (13–7)	Schwartz Athletic Center (785); Brooklyn, NY
2002 NEC tournament
March 1, 2002; 2:30 pm	vs. Monmouth; Quarterfinals	W 71–61	18–10	Spiro Sports Center (1,182); Staten Island, NY
March 2, 2002; 4:00 pm	vs. Central Connecticut State; Semifinals	L 54–58	18–11	Spiro Sports Center (N/A); Staten Island, NY
*Non-conference game. ^{#}Rankings from AP Poll. (#) Tournament seedings in parentheses.
