= 2000 Northeast Conference men's basketball tournament =

- Classification: Division I
- Season: 1999–00
- Teams: 8
- Site: Sovereign Bank Arena; Trenton, NJ
- Champions: Central Connecticut (1st title)
- Winning coach: Howie Dickenman (1st title)
- MVP: Rick Mickens (Central Connecticut)

The 2000 Northeast Conference men's basketball tournament was held in March. The tournament featured the league's top eight seeds. Central Connecticut won the championship, its first, and received the conference's automatic bid to the 2000 NCAA Tournament.

1999–2000 Northeast Conference men's basketball standings
	Conf.				Overall
Team	W		L	PCT	W		L	PCT
Central Connecticut †	15	–	3	.833	25	–	6	.806
Fairleigh Dickinson	13	–	5	.722	17	–	11	.607
Robert Morris	13	–	5	.722	18	–	12	.600
St. Francis Brooklyn	12	–	6	.667	18	–	12	.600
Quinnipiac	12	–	6	.667	18	–	10	.643
Monmouth	9	–	9	.500	12	–	16	.429
Saint Francis (PA)	7	–	11	.389	10	–	18	.357
Mount St. Mary's	7	–	11	.389	9	–	20	.310
UMBC	7	–	11	.389	11	–	18	.379
Wagner	6	–	12	.333	11	–	16	.407
Long Island	5	–	13	.278	8	–	19	.296
Sacred Heart	2	–	16	.111	3	–	25	.107
† 2000 NEC tournament winner

== Format ==
The NEC Men’s Basketball Tournament consisted of an eight-team playoff format with all games played at Sovereign Bank Arena in Trenton, NJ.

== Bracket ==
Quarterfinals
1	Central Connecticut	65
8	UMBC	58
4	St. Francis Brooklyn	86
5	Monmouth	70
2	Fairleigh Dickinson	68
7	Mount St. Mary's	73
3	Robert Morris	72
6	Saint Francis (PA)	52

Semifinals
1	Central Connecticut	83
4	St. Francis Brooklyn	73
7	Mount St. Mary's	61
3	Robert Morris	80

Championship Game
1	Central Connecticut	63
3	Robert Morris	46

== All-tournament team ==
Tournament MVP in bold.

**2000 NEC All-Tournament Team**

**Rick Mickens**, CCSU
Corsley Edwards, CCSU
Gregory Harris, MSM
Rahsaan Johnson, MU
Gene Nabors, RMU
John Tice, CCSU
