= 2001–02 Central Connecticut Blue Devils men's basketball team =

American college basketball season

2001–02 Central Connecticut Blue Devils men's basketball
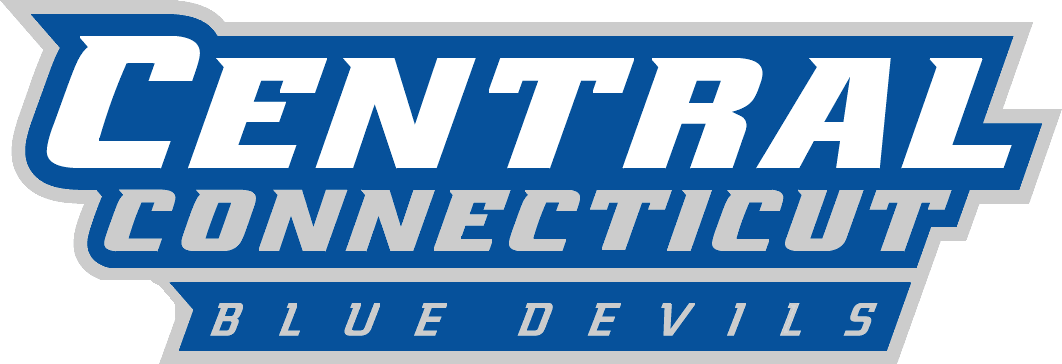

NEC tournament champions NEC Regular season champions

NCAA tournament
- Conference: Northeast Conference
- Record: 27–5 (19–1 NEC)
- Head coach: Howie Dickenman (6th season)
- Home arena: William H. Detrick Gymnasium

2001–02 Northeast Conference men's basketball standings
	Conf.				Overall
Team	W		L	PCT	W		L	PCT
Central Connecticut †	19	–	1	.950	27	–	5	.844
Wagner	15	–	5	.750	19	–	10	.655
UMBC	15	–	5	.750	20	–	9	.690
Monmouth	14	–	6	.700	18	–	12	.600
St. Francis (NY)	13	–	7	.650	18	–	11	.621
Robert Morris	11	–	9	.550	12	–	18	.400
Quinnipiac	10	–	10	.500	14	–	16	.467
Sacred Heart	7	–	13	.350	8	–	20	.286
Saint Francis (PA)	5	–	15	.250	6	–	21	.222
Long Island	5	–	15	.250	5	–	22	.185
Fairleigh Dickinson	4	–	16	.200	4	–	25	.138
Mount St. Mary's	2	–	18	.100	3	–	24	.111
† 2002 NEC tournament winner

The 2001–02 Central Connecticut Blue Devils men's basketball team represented Central Connecticut State University during the 2001–02 NCAA Division I men's basketball season. The Blue Devils were led by sixth-year head coach Howie Dickenman, and played their home games at the William H. Detrick Gymnasium in New Britain, Connecticut as members of the Northeast Conference. After finishing atop the conference regular season standings, the Blue Devils also won the Northeast Conference tournament to receive the conference's automatic bid to the NCAA Division I men's tournament. A No. 14 seed in the South region, Central Connecticut fell to No. 3 seed Pittsburgh, 71–54, to finish the season with a record of 27–5 (19–1 NEC).

== Roster ==
2001–02 Central Connecticut Blue Devils men's basketball team
Players
Coaches

Pos.	#	Name	Height	Weight	Year	Hometown
F	15	Ron Robinson	6 ft 7 in (2.01 m)	215 lb (98 kg)	So	The Bronx, New York
C	34	Corsley Edwards	6 ft 9 in (2.06 m)	265 lb (120 kg)	Sr

Head coach

- Howie Dickenman (Central Connecticut State)

Assistant coach(es)

Legend

- (C) Team captain
- (S) Suspended
- (I) Ineligible
- (W) Walk-on
- Injured
- Current redshirt

Roster

== Schedule and results ==
Date time, TV	Rank^{#}	Opponent^{#}	Result	Record	Site (attendance) city, state
Regular season
Nov 12, 2001*		at No. 25 Oklahoma	L 44–66	0–1	Lloyd Noble Center (8,140); Norman, Oklahoma
Nov 16, 2001*		Bucknell	W 68–55	1–1	Detrick Gymnasium (2,270); New Britain, Connecticut
NEC Tournament
Mar 1, 2002*		vs. Sacred Heart; Quarterfinals	W 65–54	25–4	Spiro Sports Center (1,182); Staten Island, New York
Mar 2, 2002*		vs. St. Francis (NY); Semifinals	W 58–54	26–4	Spiro Sports Center (2,062); Staten Island, New York
Mar 6, 2002*		Quinnipiac; Championship game	W 78–71	27–4	Detrick Gymnasium (3,556); New Britain, Connecticut
NCAA Tournament
Mar 15, 2002*	(14 S)	vs. (3 S) No. 9 Pittsburgh; First round	L 54–71	27–5	Mellon Arena (17,232); Pittsburgh, Pennsylvania
*Non-conference game. ^{#}Rankings from AP Poll. (#) Tournament seedings in parentheses. MW=MW. All times are in Eastern.
