= Javier Mojica =

Puerto Rican basketball player

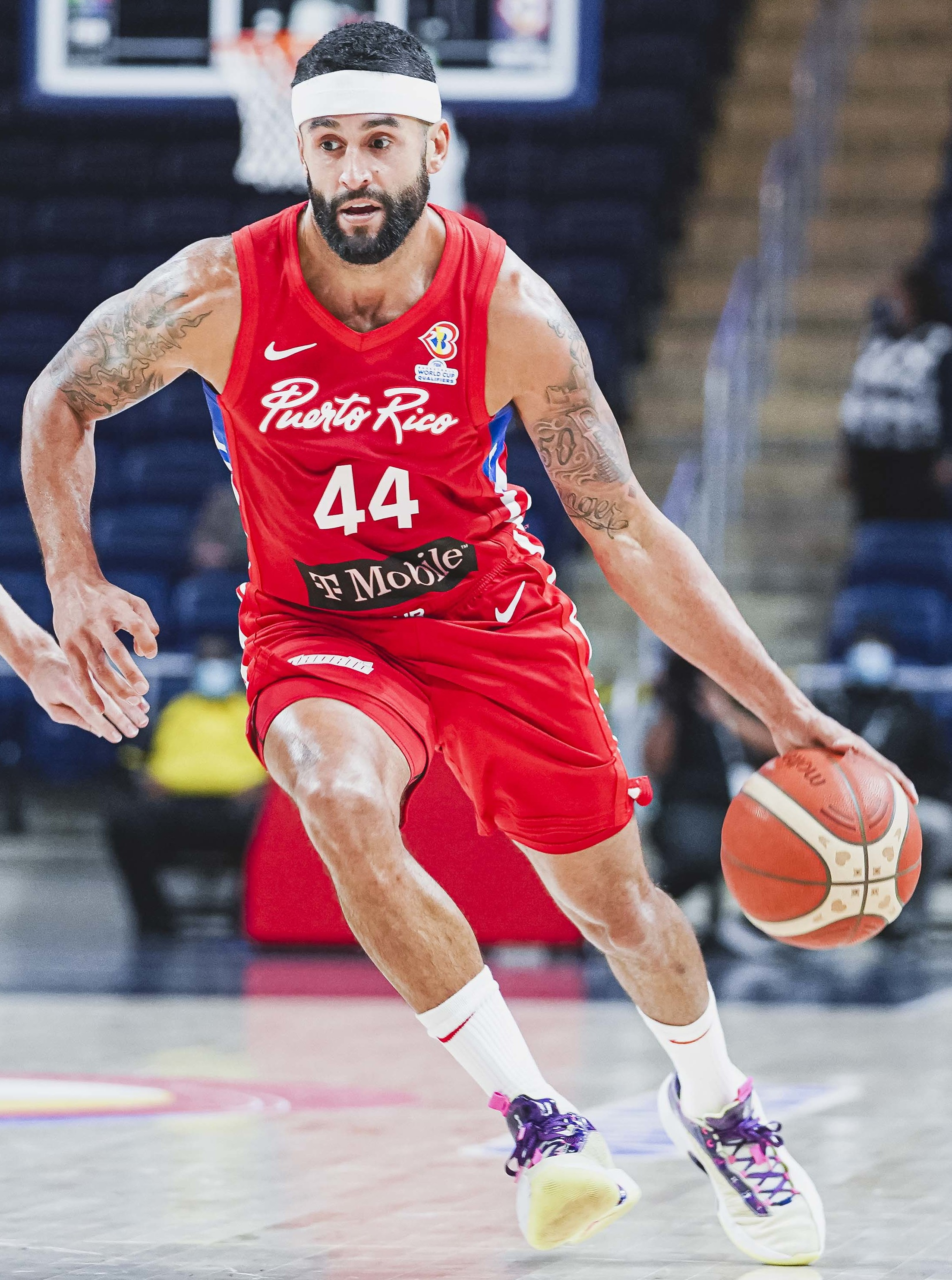
- Mojica with the Puerto Rico in 2022

No. 44 – Vaqueros de Bayamón
- Position: Shooting guard
- League: Baloncesto Superior Nacional

Personal information
- Born: August 31, 1984 (age 42) Auburn, Massachusetts, U.S.
- Listed height: 6 ft 4 in (1.93 m)
- Listed weight: 180 lb (82 kg)

Career information
- High school: Auburn (Auburn, Massachusetts)
- College: Central Connecticut (2003–2007)
- NBA draft: 2007: undrafted
- Playing career: 2007–present

Career history
- 2007–2008: B.C. Oostende
- 2008–2009: AZS Koszalin
- 2009–2012: Vaqueros de Bayamón
- 2012–2013: Quimsa
- 2013–2016: Cangrejeros de Santurce
- 2016–2017: Piratas de Quebradillas
- 2017–2020: Vaqueros de Bayamón
- 2019–2020: Leñadores de Durango
- 2020–2022: Real Estelí
- 2022–2023: Libertadores de Querétaro
- 2022–present: Vaqueros de Bayamón

Career highlights
- 6x BSN champion (2009, 2017, 2020, 2022, 2025, 2026); BSN Finals MVP (2022); NEC Player of the Year (2007); NEC tournament MVP (2007)

Javier Alexis Mojica (born August 31, 1984) is a Puerto Rican basketball player who plays for Vaqueros de Bayamón of the Baloncesto Superior Nacional (BSN). He played college basketball for Central Connecticut.

== High school career ==
Mojica attended Auburn High School in Auburn, Massachusetts. He played two seasons at Auburn and one season at Doherty Memorial High School in Worcester, Massachusetts, before transferring back to Auburn for his senior season.

== College career ==
Mojica played college basketball at Central Connecticut Blue Devils men's basketball, where he began his career as a walk-on. As a freshman, he averaged 7.9 points, 2.9 rebounds and 1.3 assists. As a sophomore, he averaged 9.9 points, 4.5 rebounds and 2.5 assists. In his Junior year, he averaged 8.9 points, 4.6 rebounds and 1.8 assists. As a senior, he averaged 16.8 points, 7.9 rebounds and 3.2 assists.

== Professional career ==
Mojica started his professional career in Poland with AZS Koszalin in the 2008–09 season. He averaged 16.6 points, 4 rebounds and 1.6 assists. In the 2008–09 season, Mojica moved to Puerto Rican side Vaqueros de Bayamón. He averaged 12.4 points, 4.5 rebounds and 2.4 assists. In his second season with the Vaqueros, he averaged 12.4 points, 5.9 rebounds and 3.4 assists. in the 2009–10 season, he moved to Belgian side B.C. Oostende, where he averaged 6.4 points, 2.9 rebounds and 1.8 assists in 10 games. He moved back to Vaqueros de Bayamón in the 2010–11 season and averaged 12.5 points, 5.4 rebounds and 2.3 assists. In the next season, he averaged 12.2 points, 3.8 rebounds and 2.1 assists for the Vaqueros. In the same 2011–12 season, he moved to Estudiantes de Bahía Blanca in Argentina, where he averaged 15.6 points, 5.6 rebounds and 1.4 assists. In the 2012–13 season, he played for Quimsa in Argentina where he averaged 10 points, 2.5 rebounds and 0.8 assists. In the 2012–13 season, he also played for the Vaqueros de Bayamón, where he averaged 14.4 points, 5.6 rebounds and 3.1 assists. In the 2013–14 season, he played for Puerto Rican side Cangrejeros de Santurce, where he averaged 9.8 points, 2.2 rebounds and 0.9 assists. In the 2014–15 season at Cangrejeros de Santurce, he averaged 12.5 points, 2.3 rebounds and 1.2 assists in that season. In the 2015–16 season, he continued at Cangrejeros de Santurce, he averaged 10.5 points, 2.7 rebounds and 1 assists. In the 2016–17 season, he moved to Puerto Rican side Piratas de Quebradillas, where he averaged 8.2 points, 2.6 rebounds and 2.5 assists. He moved back to the Vaqueros de Bayamón in the 2017–18 season. That season, he averaged 13.8 points, 4.9 rebounds and 3.0 assists. In the 2018–19 season at Vaqueros de Bayamón, Mojica averaged 18.8 points, 3.6 rebounds and 3.4 assists. In 2022, he was named the BSN Finals MVP after leading in scoring for Bayamón. After winning consecutive championships with the Vaqueros de Bayamón in 2025 and 2026, Mojica became a six-time BSN champion.

== International career ==
Mojica represented the Puerto Rican national basketball team at the 2008 FIBA World Olympic Qualifying Tournament for Men in Athens, Greece, where he averaged 3 points, 3.6 rebounds and 0.2 assists during the tournament. Mojica also represented the Puerto Rican Basketball National team at the 2019 FIBA Basketball World Cup where he averaged 2 points and 1.8 rebounds and 0.2 assists.
