= 2007 Northeast Conference men's basketball tournament =

- Classification: Division I
- Season: 2006–07
- Teams: 8
- Site: Campus sites
- Finals site: William H. Detrick Gymnasium; New Britain, CT
- Champions: Central Connecticut (3rd title)
- Winning coach: Howie Dickenman (3rd title)
- MVP: Javier Mojica (Central Connecticut)
- Attendance: 13,595 (Total); 3,210 (Championship)

2006–07 Northeast Conference men's basketball standings
	Conf.				Overall
Team	W		L	PCT	W		L	PCT
Central Connecticut †	16	–	2	.889	22	–	12	.647
Sacred Heart	12	–	6	.667	18	–	14	.563
Quinnipiac	11	–	7	.611	14	–	15	.483
Robert Morris	9	–	9	.500	17	–	11	.607
Mount St. Mary's	9	–	9	.500	11	–	20	.355
Fairleigh Dickinson	9	–	9	.500	14	–	16	.467
Wagner	8	–	10	.444	11	–	19	.367
St. Francis (NY)	7	–	11	.389	9	–	22	.290
Monmouth	7	–	11	.389	12	–	18	.400
Long Island	6	–	12	.333	10	–	19	.345
Saint Francis (PA)	5	–	13	.278	8	–	21	.276
† 2007 NEC tournament winner

The 2007 Northeast Conference men's basketball tournament was held on March 1, 4 and 7. The tournament featured the league's top eight seeds. The tourney opened on Thursday, March 1 with the quarterfinals, followed by the semifinals on Sunday, March 4 and the finals on Wednesday, March 7. Central Connecticut won the championship, its third, and received the conference's automatic bid to the 2007 NCAA Tournament.

== Format ==
For the third straight year, the NEC Men’s Basketball Tournament will consist of an eight-team playoff format with all games played at the home of the higher seed. After the quarterfinals, the teams will be reseeded so the highest remaining seed plays the lowest remaining seed in the semifinals.

== Bracket ==
Quarterfinals; Thursday, March 1
1	Central Connecticut	79
8	St. Francis (NY)	61
2	Sacred Heart	100
7	Wagner	68
(Pairings are reseeded after the first round)
3	Quinnipiac	78
6	Fairleigh Dickinson	77
4	Robert Morris	61
5	Mount St. Mary's	78

Reseeded Semifinals; Sunday, March 4
1	Central Connecticut	74
5	Mount St. Mary's	68
2	Sacred Heart	83
3	Quinnipiac	69

Championship Game; Wednesday, March 7
1	Central Connecticut	74
2	Sacred Heart	70

== All-tournament team ==
Tournament MVP in bold.

**2007 NEC All-Tournament Team**

**Javier Mojica**, CCSU
Tristan Blackwood, CCSU
Obie Nwadike, CCSU
Jarrid Frye, SHU
Joey Henley, SHU
