= 1999–2000 Central Connecticut Blue Devils men's basketball team =

American college basketball season

1999–2000 Central Connecticut Blue Devils men's basketball
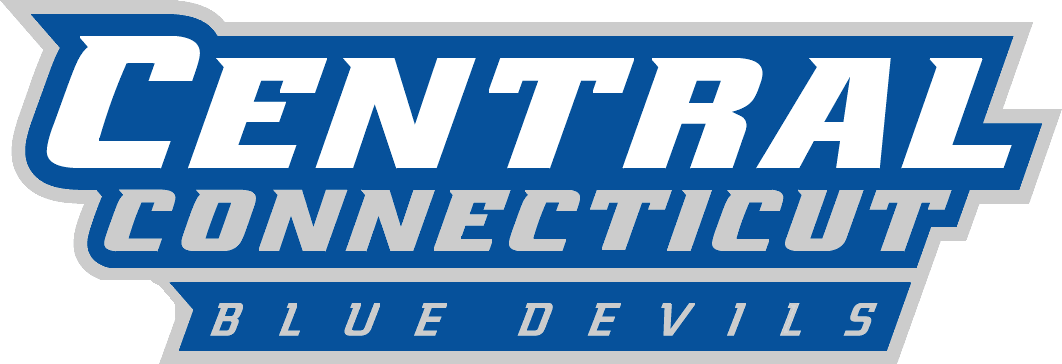

NEC tournament champions NEC Regular season champions

NCAA tournament
- Conference: Northeast Conference
- Record: 25–6 (15–3 NEC)
- Head coach: Howie Dickenman (4th season)
- Home arena: William H. Detrick Gymnasium

1999–2000 Northeast Conference men's basketball standings
	Conf.				Overall
Team	W		L	PCT	W		L	PCT
Central Connecticut †	15	–	3	.833	25	–	6	.806
Fairleigh Dickinson	13	–	5	.722	17	–	11	.607
Robert Morris	13	–	5	.722	18	–	12	.600
St. Francis Brooklyn	12	–	6	.667	18	–	12	.600
Quinnipiac	12	–	6	.667	18	–	10	.643
Monmouth	9	–	9	.500	12	–	16	.429
Saint Francis (PA)	7	–	11	.389	10	–	18	.357
Mount St. Mary's	7	–	11	.389	9	–	20	.310
UMBC	7	–	11	.389	11	–	18	.379
Wagner	6	–	12	.333	11	–	16	.407
Long Island	5	–	13	.278	8	–	19	.296
Sacred Heart	2	–	16	.111	3	–	25	.107
† 2000 NEC tournament winner

The 1999–2000 Central Connecticut Blue Devils men's basketball team represented Central Connecticut State University during the 1999–2000 NCAA Division I men's basketball season. The Blue Devils were led by fourth-year head coach Howie Dickenman, and played their home games at the William H. Detrick Gymnasium in New Britain, Connecticut as members of the Northeast Conference. After finishing atop the conference regular season standings, the Blue Devils also won the Northeast Conference tournament to receive the school's first-ever bid to the NCAA Division I men's tournament. A No. 15 seed in the Midwest region, Central Connecticut fell to No. 2 seed Iowa State, 88–78, to finish the season with a record of 25–6 (15–3 NEC).

== Roster ==
1999–2000 Central Connecticut Blue Devils men's basketball team
Players
Coaches

Pos.	#	Name	Height	Weight	Year	Hometown
G	21	Rick Mickens	6 ft 4 in (1.93 m)	—	Sr
F	24	John Tice	6 ft 5 in (1.96 m)	—	Jr
C	34	Corsley Edwards	6 ft 9 in (2.06 m)	265 lb (120 kg)	So
F		Victor Payne	6 ft 4 in (1.93 m)	—	Sr
F		Dean Walker	6 ft 5 in (1.96 m)	—	Jr

Head coach

- Howie Dickenman (Central Connecticut State)

Assistant coach(es)

Legend

- (C) Team captain
- (S) Suspended
- (I) Ineligible
- (W) Walk-on
- Injured
- Current redshirt

Roster

== Schedule and results ==
Date time, TV	Rank^{#}	Opponent^{#}	Result	Record	Site (attendance) city, state
Regular season
Nov 19, 1999*		Albany	W 70–56	1–0	Detrick Gymnasium (1,410); New Britain, Connecticut
Nov 20, 1999*		Dartmouth	W 63–61	2–0	Detrick Gymnasium (1,810); New Britain, Connecticut
Nov 23, 1999*		at La Salle	L 60–70	2–1	Tom Gola Arena (1,449); Philadelphia, Pennsylvania
Dec 2, 1999*		vs. Yale	W 59–45	3–1	Hartford Civic Center (3,291); Hartford, Connecticut
Dec 3, 1999*		vs. Hartford	W 64–61	4–1	Hartford Civic Center (7,124); Hartford, Connecticut
Dec 11, 1999*		Fairfield	L 82–85	4–2	Detrick Gymnasium (2,065); New Britain, Connecticut
Dec 18, 1999*		New Hampshire	W 87–65	5–2	Detrick Gymnasium (940); New Britain, Connecticut
Dec 21, 1999*		at Providence	W 54–50	6–2	Dunkin' Donuts Center (6,565); Providence, Rhode Island
Dec 28, 1999*		Air Force	W 83–63	7–2	Detrick Gymnasium (2,875); New Britain, Connecticut
Jan 8, 2000		Sacred Heart	W 86–55	8–2 (1–0)	Detrick Gymnasium (2,585); New Britain, Connecticut
Jan 10, 2000		Wagner	W 73–71	9–2 (2–0)	Detrick Gymnasium (1,115); New Britain, Connecticut
Jan 13, 2000		at St. Francis (NY)	W 81–79	10–2 (3–0)	Pope Physical Education Center (349); Brooklyn, New York
Jan 15, 2000		at Long Island	W 88–58	11–2 (4–0)	Schwartz Athletic Center (875); Brooklyn, New York
Jan 22, 2000		Robert Morris	W 73–52	12–2 (5–0)	Detrick Gymnasium (1,760); New Britain, Connecticut
Jan 24, 2000		Saint Francis (PA)	W 67–64	13–2 (6–0)	Detrick Gymnasium (1,910); New Britain, Connecticut
Jan 27, 2000		at Quinnipiac	W 84–63	14–2 (7–0)	Burt Kahn Court (1,500); Hamden, Connecticut
Jan 29, 2000		Fairleigh Dickinson	W 88–84 ^{OT}	15–2 (8–0)	Detrick Gymnasium (3,025); New Britain, Connecticut
Jan 31, 2000		at Monmouth	W 76–58	16–2 (9–0)	Boylan Gymnasium (1,614); West Long Branch, New Jersey
Feb 3, 2000		Mount St. Mary's	W 73–61	17–2 (10–0)	Detrick Gymnasium (2,740); New Britain, Connecticut
Feb 5, 2000		UMBC	W 63–57	18–2 (11–0)	Detrick Gymnasium (3,045); New Britain, Connecticut
Feb 10, 2000		Monmouth	W 64–51	19–2 (12–0)	Detrick Gymnasium (2,935); New Britain, Connecticut
Feb 12, 2000		at Fairleigh Dickinson	L 58–69	19–3 (12–1)	Rothman Center (3,096); Hackensack, New Jersey
Feb 17, 2000		at Robert Morris	L 64–71 ^{OT}	19–4 (12–2)	Charles L. Sewall Center (1,293); Moon Township, Pennsylvania
Feb 19, 2000		at Saint Francis (PA)	W 65–57	20–4 (13–2)	DeGol Arena (1,863); Loretto, Pennsylvania
Feb 22, 2000		Quinnipiac	W 94–60	21–4 (14–2)	Detrick Gymnasium (3,275); New Britain, Connecticut
Feb 24, 2000		at Wagner	L 77–88	21–5 (14–3)	Spiro Sports Center (1,132); Staten Island, New York
Feb 26, 2000		at Sacred Heart	W 99–57	22–5 (15–3)	William H. Pitt Center (1,750); Fairfield, Connecticut
NEC Tournament
Mar 3, 2000*		vs. UMBC; Quarterfinals	W 63–55	23–5	Sovereign Bank Arena (NA); Trenton, New Jersey
Mar 4, 2000*		vs. St. Francis (NY); Semifinals	W 83–73	24–5	Sovereign Bank Arena (NA); Trenton, New Jersey
Mar 5, 2000*		vs. Robert Morris; Championship game	W 63–46	25–5	Sovereign Bank Arena (2,014); Trenton, New Jersey
NCAA Tournament
Mar 16, 2000*; CBS	(15 MW)	vs. (2 MW) No. 6 Iowa State; First Round	L 78–88	25–6	Hubert H. Humphrey Metrodome (22,013); Minneapolis, Minnesota
*Non-conference game. ^{#}Rankings from AP Poll. (#) Tournament seedings in parentheses. MW=MW. All times are in Eastern.
