= Ken Horton (basketball) =

American basketball player (born 1989)

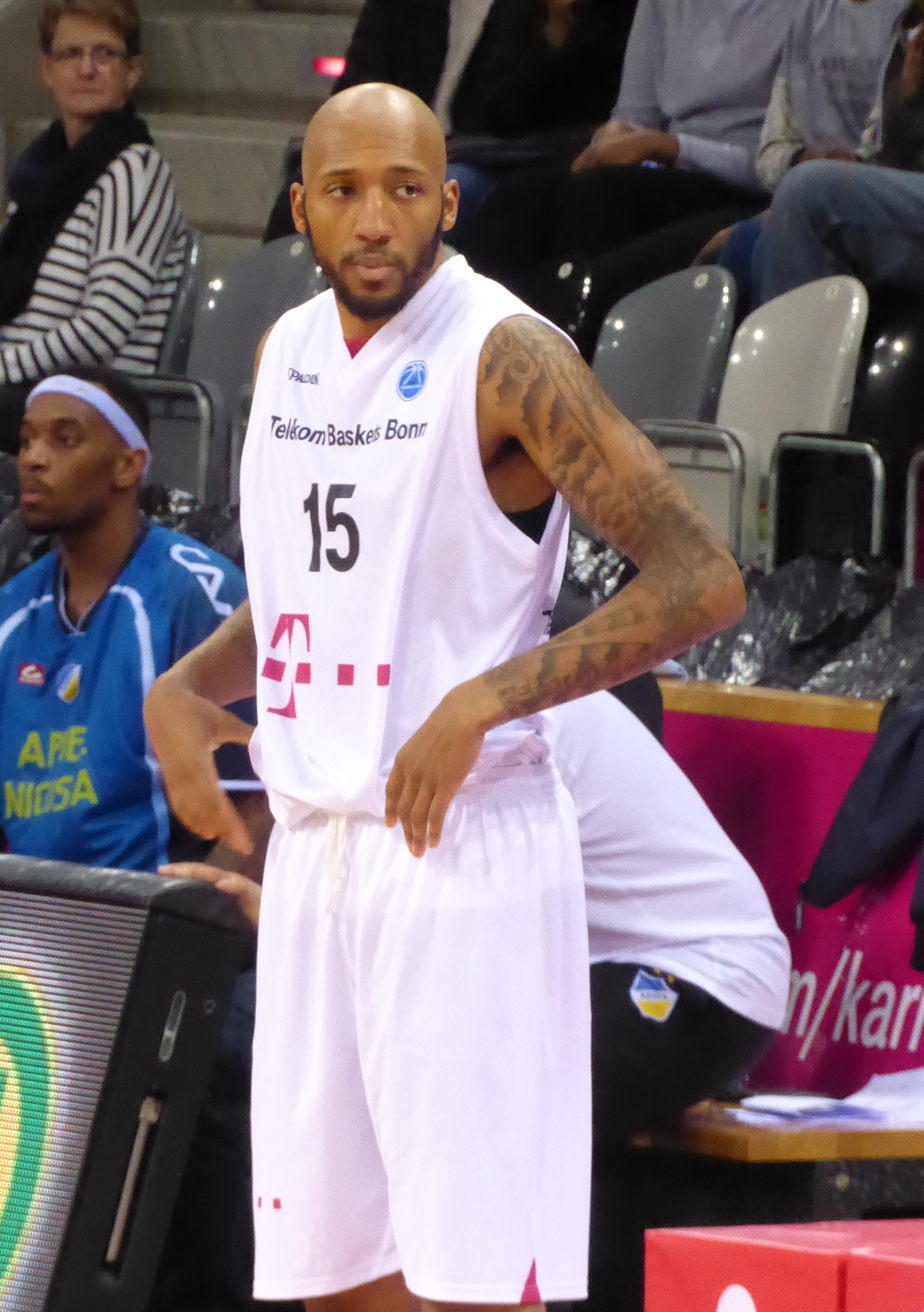
- Horton with Bonn in 2016

Personal information
- Born: July 25, 1989 (age 37)
- Listed height: 2.01 m (6 ft 7 in)
- Listed weight: 99 kg (218 lb)

Career information
- High school: Ossining (Ossining, New York)
- College: Central Connecticut (2007–2012)
- NBA draft: 2012: undrafted
- Playing career: 2012–present
- Position: Small forward

Career history
- 2012–2013: SOMB
- 2013: Apollon Limassol
- 2013–2014: Huracanes de Tampico
- 2014–2015: Kataja
- 2015–2016: Bayreuth
- 2016–2017: Bonn
- 2017–2018: Élan Béarnais Pau-Orthez
- 2018–2019: Astana
- 2019–2020: Germani Basket Brescia
- 2020–2022: San Pablo Burgos
- 2022–2023: Beirut Club
- 2023–2024: Fuenlabrada
- 2024: Halcones Rojos Veracruz
- 2025: Mineros de Zacatecas

Career highlights
- 2× Champions League champion (2020, 2021); FIBA Intercontinental Cup champion (2021); AP Honorable mention All-American (2011); NEC Player of the Year (2011); 2× First-team All-NEC (2011, 2012); Second-team All-NEC (2009)

Kenneth Horton (born July 25, 1989) is an American professional basketball player for Fuenlabrada of the Liga ACB. After going undrafted in the 2012 NBA draft he has played for teams in Cyprus, France, Kazakhstan, Italy, and Mexico.

== College career ==
Horton attended Ossining High School in Ossining, New York, before enrolling at Central Connecticut State University (CCSU) as a freshman in 2007. In 2007–08, Horton averaged 12.7 points and 5.4 rebounds per game and was named to the All-Northeast Conference (NEC) Rookie Team. He recorded 63 blocks on the season, good for the fourth-most in school history while also becoming the first freshman since 1996–97 to lead the NEC in that category. The following season, Horton was named a Second Team all-conference performer. He led the Blue Devils and was third in the conference with 16.5 points per game while his 5.8 rebounds also topped his team. Due to an injury, he was forced to redshirt (sit out) his junior year in 2009–10.

When Horton returned as a redshirt junior in 2010–11, he proved himself to be the class of the Northeast Conference. He led the league in scoring at 19.5 points per outing, was third in rebounding with 8.9 per game, scored 20+ points 14 times and 30+ points on four occasions. He also led the NEC in double-doubles (12) and accumulated five NEC Player of the Week awards, more than any other player that season. He was named the Northeast Conference Player of the Year, becoming the fifth Blue Devil all-time to earn the award. The Associated Press also named him as an Honorable Mention All-American.

Although Horton's senior season in 2011–12 was statistically comparable to his breakout junior season (19.0 points, 8.9 rebounds per game), he failed to repeat as the conference's player of the year. He did finish his collegiate career, however, as Central Connecticut's all-time men's basketball leading scorer with 1,966 career points.

== Professional career ==
Horton was invited to participate in the 2012 Portsmouth Invitational Tournament, an annual event that showcases 64 of the top graduating seniors across the country for NBA scouts. However, he did not get selected in that year's NBA draft. Horton then began to pursue his professional career overseas. His first stop was in France for Stade Olympique Maritime Boulonnais, followed by Cyprus' Apollon Limassol. In the 2013–14 season he played for Huracanes de Tampico in Mexico and for the 2014–15 season he signed with the Finnish club Kataja Basket.

Horton played for Élan Béarnais Pau-Orthez in France in the 2017–18 season, during which time he averaged 11.9 points and 5.3 rebounds per game. On September 5, 2018, he signed with Astana of the Kazakhstan Championship.

On June 24, 2019, he signed a 1-year deal with Germani Basket Brescia of the LBA. Horton averaged 11 points and 5 rebounds per game. On August 6, 2020, he signed with San Pablo Burgos of the Liga ACB. With Burgos, he won the 2019–20 Basketball Champions League.

Horton has also played for Beirut Club in Lebanon until February 22, 2023, when he signed with Fuenlabrada of the Liga ACB.
