= Tristan Blackwood =

Canadian basketball player

Free agent
- Position: Shooting guard

Personal information
- Born: January 14, 1985 (age 41) Toronto, Ontario, Canada
- Listed height: 6 ft 0 in (1.83 m)

Career information
- High school: Eastern Commerce (Toronto, Ontario)
- College: Central Connecticut (2004–2008)
- NBA draft: 2008: undrafted
- Playing career: 2008–present

Career history
- 2008–2010: Aris Leeuwarden
- 2010: EiffelTowers Den Bosch
- 2010–2011: S.Oliver Baskets
- 2011: Giro-Live Ballers Osnabrück
- 2011–2012: Phoenix Hagen
- 2012–2013: USC Heidelberg
- 2013–2015: BSW Sixers

Career highlights
- First-team All-NEC (2007); NEC Co-Defensive Player of the Year
Medals
Men's basketball
Representing Canada
FIBA U21 World Championship
Bronze medal – third place	2005 Mar del Plata	National team

Tristan Blackwood (born January 14, 1985) is a Canadian basketball player. He played guard for Central Connecticut State University (CCSU). Blackwood was voted to the NEC First Team in 2007 along with teammates Obie Nwadike and Conference Player of the Year Javier Mojica.^{1} Blackwood is listed at 6 feet, 170 pounds.^{2} In 2008, he completed his senior year at CCSU.

== High school basketball ==
Blackwood played basketball for five seasons at Eastern Commerce in Toronto. Over the course of his five seasons playing varsity basketball at Eastern Commerce, he helped lead the team to three straight 4A OFSAA Championships. In his senior year he was named to the 2004 All-Canadian High School All-Star Game.^{2}

== College basketball ==
From his first game at Central, Blackwood established himself as one of the team's stars. He started all 28 games his freshman year, the only player on the team to do so. He led the team with 98 assists and was second in steals with 26. His success continued in his sophomore season. Blackwood scored 14.3 points per game and recorded 113 assists (4.2 per game) leading his team in both categories. Once again he led his team in steals and was second in three-pointers with 71. While his sophomore year is widely considered to be his breakout season, over the course of his junior year he established himself as a star. Blackwood led the team in scoring with 17.1 points per game. He also averaged 4.1 assists per game leading his team in that category as well. He hit a staggering 122 three-pointers ranking amongst the top shooters in the country. Also Blackwood was almost automatic from the free throw line, hitting 97 and missing only 8 all season.^{3}

== NCAA tournament ==
Blackwood has played one game in the NCAA tournament. In 2007, after CCSU went 16–2 in-conference and won the NEC tournament, Central entered the tournament as a 16 seed. They were matched up against top-seeded Ohio State. On March 15 the two teams played at Rupp Arena in Lexington, Kentucky. Ohio State won 78-57 ousting CCSU from the tournament. Blackwood was held to 12 points, all on three point field goals.^{4}

== Canada Basketball ==
Blackwood has represented Canada Basketball throughout his career. Named to the 2004 All-Canadian High School All-Star Game. Named Toronto Sun Mr. Basketball Ontario. Named to Toronto Sun's All-GTA and All-Ontario teams and a member of the Toronto Star Dream Team. Named Silver Fox Tournament MVP after leading Eastern to third straight title. Named Seneca Invitational MVP. Attended the 2003 Nike All-Canada Camp. Led Ontario to a gold medal and was named MVP of the 2002 Juvenile Boy's National Championships. A member of Basketball Ontario's Juvenile Development Program. Started two games for Canada during Summer Series 2004. Led Team Canada in assists (16) and three-point field goals (7) at the Global Games. Started four games for Canada at the 2004 Under-21 Tournament of the Americas. Canada finished fourth and qualified for the 2005 Under-21 World Championship for the first time ever. Averaged 18.2 minutes, 5.6 points and 3.0 assists in five games.
