= Howie Dickenman =

American basketball player-coach (born 1946)

Biographical details
- Born: November 9, 1946 (age 79); Norwich, Connecticut, U.S.

Playing career
- 1966–1969: Central Connecticut
- Position: Center

Coaching career (HC unless noted)
- 1970–1973: New Britain HS (asst.)
- 1973–1975: Greater Hartford CC
- 1975–1977: Central Connecticut (asst.)
- 1977–1982: Canisius (asst.)
- 1982–1996: Connecticut (asst.)
- 1996–2016: Central Connecticut

Head coaching record
- Overall: 282–311 (.476)
- Tournaments: 0–3 (NCAA Division I)

Accomplishments and honors

Championships
- 3 NEC tournament (2000, 2002, 2007); 3 NEC regular season (2000, 2002, 2007)

Awards
- Connecticut Sports Writers' Alliance Gold Key (1996); Norwich Sportsperson of the Year (1999); New England Division I Coach of the Year (2000); District One Coach of the Year (2000); Eastern Basketball Coach of the Year (2002); 4x NEC Coach of the Year (2000, 2002, 2006, 2007); National Association of Basketball Coaches Literacy Champion Award (2009)

Howard Brandt Dickenman Jr. (born November 9, 1946) is an American retired college basketball coach and the former men's basketball head coach for the Central Connecticut State University Blue Devils. He was the second-longest tenured head coach in program history. Previous to becoming the CCSU head coach, he spent fourteen years as an assistant coach for the Connecticut Huskies; the last ten years were as the top assistant under Hall-of-Fame coach Jim Calhoun. His first coaching job was assistant coach at New Britain High School in New Britain, Connecticut, a position he held for three years.

A native of Norwich, Connecticut, Dickenman played collegiately at Central Connecticut State University from 1966 to 1969 as a 6'4" center. He was the first pick of the 17th round of the 1969 NBA draft by the Phoenix Suns after averaging 17.7 points and 14.7 rebounds his senior season, although he never played in the league. He was recognized as the 1996 Norwich Native Son Award.

Dickenman retired at the end of the 2015–16 season. In his retirement press conference, he expressed a dream of becoming a Santa Claus, which he achieved in December 2016.

== Head coaching record ==
Record table
Season	Team	Overall	Conference	Standing	Postseason
Central Connecticut Blue Devils (Mid-Continent Conference) (1996–1997)
1996–97	Central Connecticut	8–19	4–12	T–7th	
Central Connecticut Blue Devils (Northeast Conference) (1997–2016)
1997–98	Central Connecticut	4–22	3–13	T–9th	
1998–99	Central Connecticut	19–13	11–9	4th	
1999–00	Central Connecticut	25–6	15–3	1st	NCAA Division I First Round
2000–01	Central Connecticut	14–14	11–9	T–5th	
2001–02	Central Connecticut	26–5	19–1	1st	NCAA Division I First Round
2002–03	Central Connecticut	15–13	12–6	3rd	
2003–04	Central Connecticut	14–14	9–9	7th	
2004–05	Central Connecticut	12–16	8–10	8th	
2005–06	Central Connecticut	18–11	13–5	2nd	
2006–07	Central Connecticut	22–12	16–2	1st	NCAA Division I First Round
2007–08	Central Connecticut	14–16	10–8	6th	
2008–09	Central Connecticut	13–17	8–10	T–6th	
2009–10	Central Connecticut	12–18	9–9	T–6th	
2010–11	Central Connecticut	19–12	11–7	4th	
2011–12	Central Connecticut	13–16	10–8	T–5th	
2012–13	Central Connecticut	13–17	9–9	7th	
2013–14	Central Connecticut	11–19	7–9	6th	
2014–15	Central Connecticut	5–26	3–15	T–9th	
2015–16	Central Connecticut	4–25	3–15	10th	
Central Connecticut:		282–311 (.476)	191–169 (.531)		
Total:		282–311 (.476)			
National champion Postseason invitational champion Conference regular season champion Conference regular season and conference tournament champion Division regular season champion Division regular season and conference tournament champion Conference tournament champion
