= Ron Robinson (basketball) =

American basketball player

Personal information
- Born: December 6, 1980 (age 45) The Bronx, New York, U.S.
- Listed height: 6 ft 7 in (2.01 m)
- Listed weight: 215 lb (98 kg)

Career information
- High school: Truman (The Bronx, New York); Bronx Regional (The Bronx, New York); The Winchendon School (Winchendon, Massachusetts)
- College: Central Connecticut (2000–2004)
- NBA draft: 2004: undrafted
- Playing career: 2004–2004
- Position: Forward

Career highlights
- NEC Player of the Year (2004); 2× First-team All-NEC (2003, 2004); NEC All-Rookie team (2001)

Ron Robinson Jr. (born December 6, 1980) is an American former professional basketball player. He played college basketball for the Central Connecticut Blue Devils and was the Northeast Conference Player of the Year in 2004. Robinson played professionally in Europe.

== Early life ==
Robinson was raised in the Bronx, New York. His parents were both murdered in separate shooting incidents in the Bronx: his father, Ron Sr., when Robinson was aged eight and his mother, Desiree Randall, when he was aged ten. Robinson moved in with his grandmother, Emma Harris, who lived in Brooklyn but she lost her apartment and they resorted to living in homeless shelters throughout New York City. Harris died less than three years later and Robinson returned to Bronx to live with his aunt. Robinson spent three years with his aunt before she died of a chronic lung condition and he was taken in by a friend.

Robinson attended seven elementary schools and four high schools. After struggling at Truman High School, he transferred to Bronx Regional High School where he became an all-city player. Robinson was introduced to The Boys Club of New York at the age of 17 by a friend and credits the club as saving his life. He toured China with The Boys Club team in 1999. Aided by the club's academic program, Robinson improved his grades and received a scholarship to attend The Winchendon School in Winchendon, Massachusetts.

== College career ==
Robinson was spotted by Central Connecticut Blue Devils assistant coach, Patrick Sellers, at Winchendon. Blue Devils head coach Howie Dickenman had a friend who knew the executive director of the Boys Club of New York and recruited Robinson at his home in the Bronx.

Robinson joined the Blue Devils as strictly a rebounder who could not shoot free throws. He developed a jump shot and offensive moves throughout his first three seasons. Robinson was selected to the Northeast Conference all-rookie team in 2001. The Blue Devils made the 2002 NCAA Division I basketball tournament with a leadership group of Robinson, Damian Battles, Ricardo Scott and Corsley Edwards.

Robinson was announced as the Blue Devils' captain before the 2002–03 season. Robinson was considered to be the "heart and soul" of the Blue Devils during his senior season in 2003–04. He played the Blue Devils into the NEC title game despite the team being a seventh seed with a 14–14 record. Robinson led the team in scoring and rebounding with 18.0 points and 9.7 rebounds per game. He was named as the Northeast Conference Player of the Year in 2004 and was a two-time first-team all-conference selection.

== Professional career ==
Robinson had a workout with the Toronto Raptors of the National Basketball Association (NBA). He was selected by the St. Louis Skyhawks in the 2004 United States Basketball League (USBL) draft as the 44th and final pick. Robinson played professionally in Belgium, Finland and Iceland where he was released by all three teams he played for in 2004.

== Personal life ==
Robinson's first daughter was born in 2003 and named after his mother.
