= William T. Boylan Gymnasium =

Arena in West Long Branch, New Jersey, US

Coordinates: 40.2788°N 74.0078°W

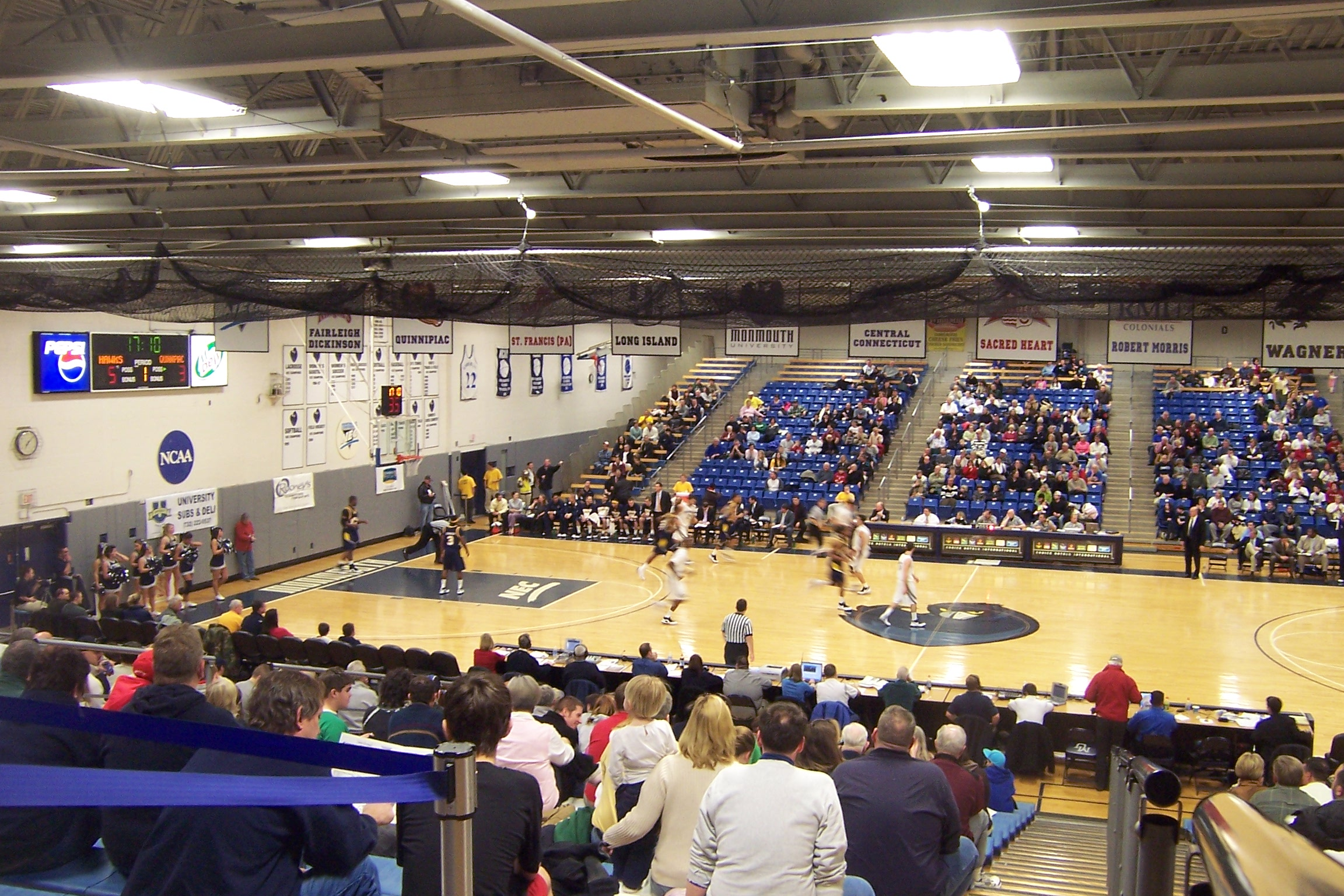
Boylan Gymnasium interior during a January 2009 men's basketball game between the Hawks and the Quinnipiac Bobcats.

William T. Boylan Gymnasium is a 2,500-seat multi-purpose arena in West Long Branch, New Jersey. It was built in 1965 and was home to the Monmouth University Hawks basketball team. The Northeast Conference men's basketball tournament was held there in 1996 and 2004.

Originally named the Alumni Memorial Gymnasium, it was renamed in honor of William T. Boylan on May 16, 1992.

The basketball teams moved into the Multipurpose Activity Center at the start of the 2009–2010 season.
