= Central Connecticut Blue Devils men's basketball =

College basketball team

2025–26 Central Connecticut Blue Devils men's basketball team
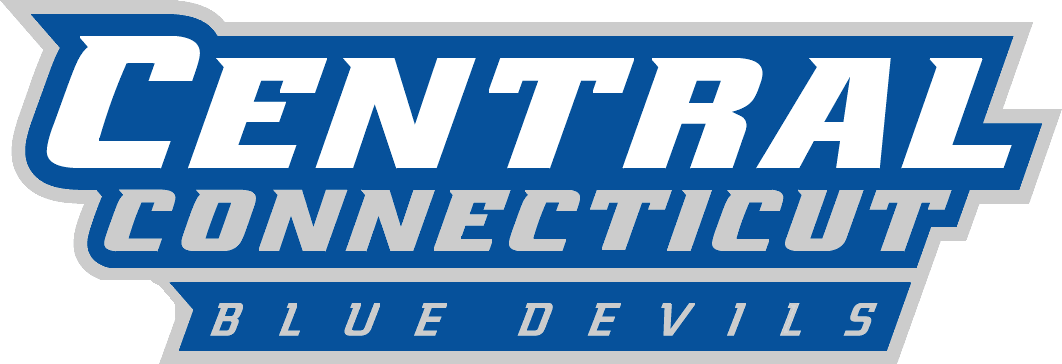
- University: Central Connecticut State University
- Head coach: Patrick Sellers (5th season)
- Location: New Britain, Connecticut
- Arena: William H. Detrick Gymnasium (capacity: 2,654)
- Conference: Northeast Conference
- Nickname: Blue Devils
- Colors: Blue and white
- All-time record: 1,184–1,060 (.528)

NCAA Division I tournament Elite Eight
- 1966*
Other NCAA Division I tournament results
Sweet Sixteen	1966*, 1971*
Appearances	1966*, 1967*, 1969*, 1971*, 1983*, 1984*, 2000, 2002, 2007

Conference tournament champions
- 2000, 2002, 2007

Conference regular-season champions
- 2000, 2002, 2007, 2024, 2025

Uniforms
Home	Away
- * at Division II level

The Central Connecticut Blue Devils men's basketball team is the men's basketball team that represent Central Connecticut State University in New Britain, Connecticut, United States. The school's team currently competes in the Northeast Conference and is coached by Patrick Sellers. The team last played in the NCAA Division I men's basketball tournament in 2007.

== History ==
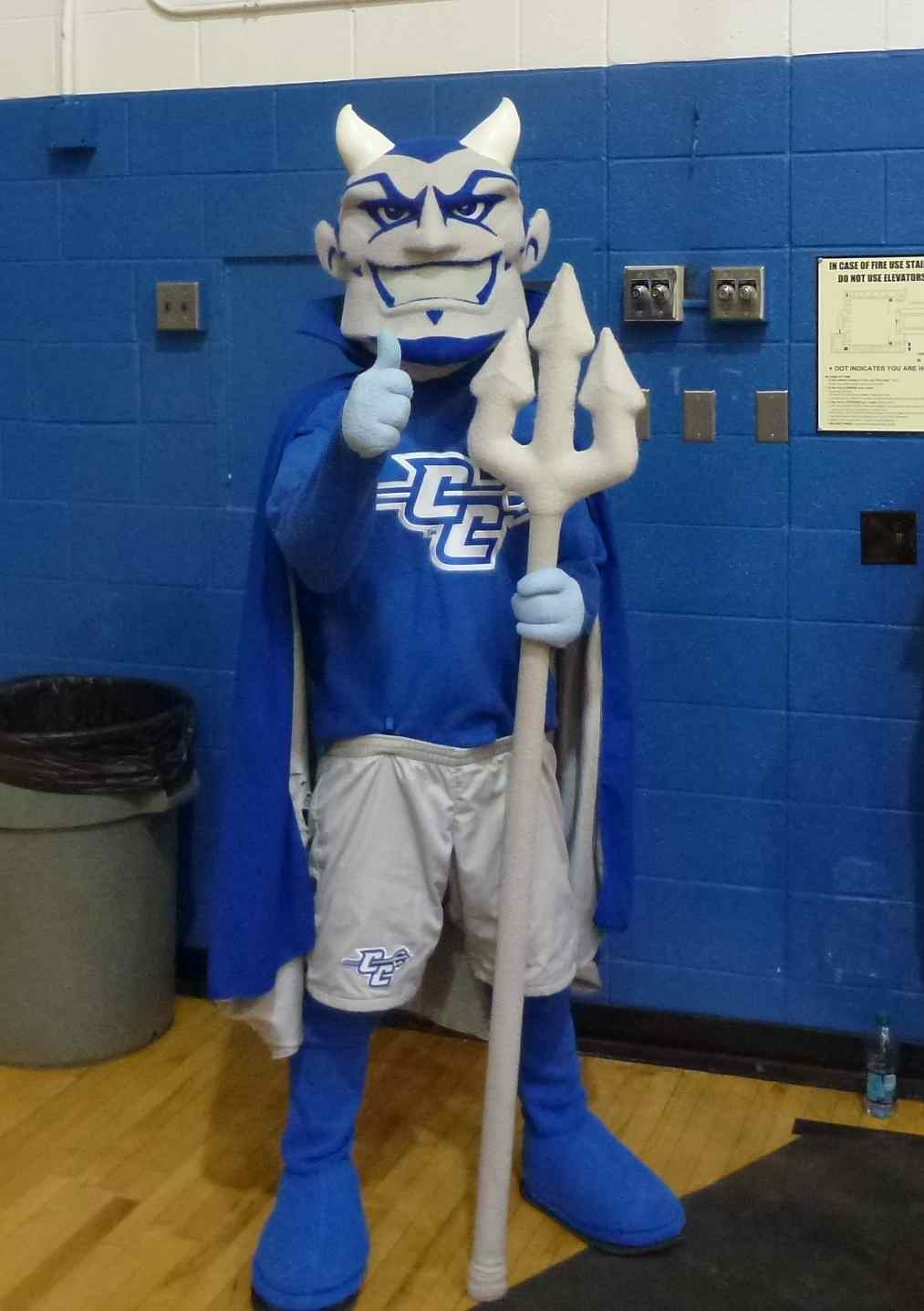
Mascot of the Central Connecticut State University athletic teams

Central's first year of competition was the 1934–35 season under coach Harrison J. Kaiser, after whom the athletic building is named. CCSU joined the NCAA Division I ranks in the 1986–87 season, marking 2020–21 as the 35th season at the Division I level.

=== Classification ===
Years	Classification	National tournaments	Seasons
1986–87 to Present	NCAA Division I	3 appearances	35
1965–66 to 1985–86	NCAA Division II	6 appearances	21
1934–35 to 1964–65	NAIB/NAIA	10 appearances	29

=== Home court ===
Years	Venue	Seasons
1965–66 to present	Kaiser Hall – Detrick Gymnasium	56
1947–48 to 1964–65	Memorial Hall	18
1934–35 to 1946–47	Teachers Gymnasium	11

=== Conference affiliation ===
Years	Conference	Seasons
1997–98 to Present	Northeast Conference	24
1994–95 to 1996–97	Mid-Continent Conference	3
1990–91 to 1991–92, 1993–94	East Coast Conference	3
1986–87 to 1989–90, 1992–93	Division I Independent	5
1972–73 to 1982–83, 1985–86	Division II Independent	12
1983–84 to 1984–85	New England Collegiate Conference	2
1967–68 to 1971–72	North-East Collegiate Basketball League	5
1961–62 to 1966–67	Independent	6
1934–35 to 1960-61	New England Teachers College Conference	25

== Year by year results ==
Season	Coach	Overall	Conference	Standing	Postseason
Howie Dickenman (Mid-Continent Conference/Northeast Conference) (1996–2016)
1996–97	Howie Dickenman	8–19	4–12	T–7th	
Northeast Conference
1997–98	Howie Dickenman	4–22	3–13	T–9th	
1998–99	Howie Dickenman	19–13	11–9	4th	
1999–2000	Howie Dickenman	25–6	15–2	1st	NCAA first round
2000–01	Howie Dickenman	14–14	11–9	T–5th	
2001–02	Howie Dickenman	27–5	19–1	1st	NCAA first round
2002–03	Howie Dickenman	15–13	12–6	3rd	
2003–04	Howie Dickenman	14–14	9–9	7th	
2004–05	Howie Dickenman	12–16	8–10	8th	
2005–06	Howie Dickenman	18–11	13–5	2nd	
2006–07	Howie Dickenman	22–12	16–2	1st	NCAA first round
2007–08	Howie Dickenman	14–16	10–8	6th	
2008–09	Howie Dickenman	13–17	8–10	T–6th	
2009–10	Howie Dickenman	12–18	9–9	T–6th	
2010–11	Howie Dickenman	19–12	11–7	4th	
2011–12	Howie Dickenman	13–16	10–8	T–5th	
2012–13	Howie Dickenman	13–17	9–9	7th	
2013–14	Howie Dickenman	11–19	7–9	6th	
2014–15	Howie Dickenman	5–26	3–15	T–9th	
2015–16	Howie Dickenman	4–25	3–15	10th	
Howie Dickenman:		282–311 (.476)	191–169 (.531)		
Donyell Marshall (Northeast Conference) (2016–2021)
2016–17	Donyell Marshall	6–23	4–14	9th	
2017–18	Donyell Marshall	14–18	7–11	8th	
2018–19	Donyell Marshall	11–20	5–13	10th	
2019–20	Donyell Marshall	4–27	3–15	11th	
2020–21	Donyell Marshall	5–16	5–13	T–9th	
Donyell Marshall:		40–104 (.278)	39–89 (.305)		
Patrick Sellers (Northeast Conference) (2021–present)
2021–22	Patrick Sellers	8–24	5–13	9th	
2022–23	Patrick Sellers	10–22	7–9	T–7th	
2023–24	Patrick Sellers	20–11	13–3	T–1st	
2024–25	Patrick Sellers	24–6	14–2	1st	
Patrick Sellers:		62–63 (.496)	39–27 (.591)		
Total:		380–451 (.457)			
National champion Postseason invitational champion Conference regular season champion Conference regular season and conference tournament champion Division regular season champion Division regular season and conference tournament champion Conference tournament champion

== Postseason ==
=== NCAA Division I tournament results ===
The Blue Devils have appeared in three NCAA Division I Tournaments. Their combined record is 0–3.

Year	Seed	Round	Opponent	Result
2000	#15	First Round	#2 Iowa State	L 78–88
2002	#14	First Round	#3 Pittsburgh	L 54–71
2007	#16	First Round	#1 Ohio State	L 57–78

=== NCAA Division II tournament results ===
The Blue Devils have appeared in six NCAA Division II Tournaments. Their combined record is 6–8.

Year	Opponent	Result	Round
1966	First Round; Regional Semifinals; Regional Final; Elite Eight	Potsdam State; Philadelphia Textile; Assumption; Kentucky Wesleyan	W 94–82; W 96–75; W 96–87; L 76–84
1967	Regional Semifinals; Regional Finals	Buffalo State; Long Island	W 90–73; L 76–114
1969	Regional Semifinals; Regional Third Place	Springfield; Assumption	L 80–91; L 77–98
1971	Regional Semifinals; Regional Finals	Stonehill; Assumption	W 111–99; L 77–105
1983	Regional Semifinals; Regional Third Place	American International; Assumption	L 64–65; L 89–99^{OT}
1984	Regional Semifinals; Regional Third Place	South Dakota State; American International	L 59–74; W 102–90

=== NAIA national tournament results ===
The Blue Devils have appeared in 10 NAIB/NAIA National Tournaments at Municipal Auditorium in Kansas City, Missouri. Their combined record is 1–10.

Year	Round	Opponent	Result	Ranking
1948	First Round; Second Round	Montana; Xavier (Ohio)	W 63–52; L 39–57	–
1949	First Round	Indiana Central	L 59–72	–
1950	First Round	Westminster (Pa.)	L 62–70	–
1959	First Round	#12 Westminster (Pa.)	L 76–79	–
1960	First Round	#6 Grambling	L 68–92	–
1961	First Round	#11 Southwest Texas State	L 59–70	–
1962	First Round	#16 William Jewell (Mo.)	L 52–57	–
1963	First Round	Athens State (Ala.)	L 71–72	#16
1964	First Round	Saint Mary’s (Texas)	L 62–64	#14
1965	First Round	#9 Augsburg (Minn.)	L 87–103	–

== NCAA Division I conference awards ==
=== Player of the Year ===
Northeast Conference

- 2026 – Darin Smith Jr.
- 2025 – Jordan Jones
- 2011 – Ken Horton
- 2007 – Javier Mojica
- 2004 – Ron Robinson
- 2002 – Corsley Edwards
- 2000 – Rick Mickens

=== Defensive Player of the Year ===
Northeast Conference

- 2008 – Tristan Blackwood
- 2007 – Tristan Blackwood
- 2000 – Rick Mickens
- 2025 – Abdul Momoh

East Coast Conference

- 1991 – Patrick Sellers

=== Rookie of the Year ===
Northeast Conference

- 2012 – Kyle Vinales
- 2008 – Shemik Thompson

East Coast Conference

- 1991 – Bryon Smith

=== All-Conference First Team ===
Northeast Conference

- 2013 – Kyle Vinales
- 2012 – Ken Horton
- 2011 – Ken Horton
- 2008 – Tristan Blackwood
- 2007 – Tristan Blackwood, Javier Mojica, Obie Nwadike
- 2006 – Justin Chiera
- 2004 – Ron Robinson
- 2003 – Ron Robinson
- 2002 – Corsley Edwards
- 2001 – Corsley Edwards
- 2000 – Rick Mickens

Mid-Continent Conference

- 1996 – Keith Closs

=== All-Conference Second Team ===
Northeast Conference

- 2015 – Matt Mobley
- 2009 – Ken Horton
- 2002 – Damian Battles, Ricardo Scott
- 2001 – John Tice
- 2000 – Corsley Edwards, John Tice
- 1999 – Rick Mickens, Charron Watson
- 1998 – Rick Mickens

Mid-Continent Conference

- 1997 – Sean Scott

=== All-Rookie Team ===
Northeast Conference

- 2020 – Myles Baker
- 2019 – Ian Krishnan
- 2016 – Austin Nehls
- 2014 – Matt Mobley
- 2013 – Brandon Peel
- 2012 – Kyle Vinales
- 2008 – Ken Horton, Shemik Thompson
- 2004 – Obie Nwadike
- 2003 – Justin Chiera
- 2001 – Ron Robinson
- 1999 – Corsley Edwards
- 1998 – Marijus Kovaliukas

Mid-Continent Conference

- 1995 – Keith Closs, Bill Langheim

=== Coach of the Year ===
Northeast Conference

- Howie Dickenman – 2007, 2006, 2002, 2000

== Other awards ==
=== All-American Selections ===
First Team

- Howie Dickenman – 1969

Second Team

- Richard Leonard – 1984 & 1983
- Steve Ayers – 1982
- Bill Reaves – 1971 & 1970

Third Team

- Steve Ayers – 1981

Honorable Mention

- Ken Horton – 2011

UPI Selection

- Eugene Reily – 1966

=== All-New England selections ===
First Team

- Rich Leonard – 1984
- Steve Ayers – 1982
- Bill Reaves – 1971
- Howie Dickenman – 1969

Second Team

- Corsley Edwards – 2002
- Rick Mickens – 2000
- Byran Heron – 1989
- Ken Hightower – 1984
- Rich Leonard & Steve Ayers – 1983
- Billy Wendt – 1973
- Howie Dickenman – 1968
- Paul Zajac – 1967

Third Team

- Greg Roberts – 1978
- Jere Quinn & Robert Charbonneau – 1977

== Blue Devils in the NBA ==
- Corsley Edwards – 2002 NBA Draft – Round 2, Pick 29 / Sacramento Kings (10 games played)
- Keith Closs – 1997 Free Agent / Los Angeles Clippers (130 games played)
- Howie Dickenman – 1969 NBA Draft – Round 17, Pick 210 / Phoenix Suns (did not play)
