= LIU Sharks men's basketball =

Basketball team representing Long Island University

2025–26 LIU Sharks men's basketball team
- University: Long Island University
- Head coach: Rod Strickland (4th season)
- Location: Brooklyn, New York
- Arena: Steinberg Wellness Center and Barclays Center (capacity: 3,000/17,732)
- Conference: Northeast Conference
- Nickname: Sharks
- Colors: Blue and gold

NCAA Division I tournament appearances
- Division I 1981^{#}, 1984^{#}, 1997^{#}, 2011^{#}, 2012^{#}, 2013^{#}, 2018^{#}, 2026^{^} Division II; 1962*, 1965^{#}, 1966^{#}, 1967^{#}, 1971*, 1973*, 1974*. 1983*, 1984*, 1985*, 1987*, 1989*, 1990*, 1993*, 2002*, 2003*, 2008*, 2009*, 2011*, 2012*

Pre-tournament Helms national champions
- 1939

Conference tournament champions
- LIU Brooklyn Blackbirds; 1981, 1984, 1997, 2011, 2012, 2013, 2018 LIU Post Pioneers; 1990, 1991, 2004, 2008, 2009, 2011, 2012 LIU Sharks; 2026

Conference regular-season champions
- LIU Brooklyn Blackbirds; Metro NY: 1936, 1937, 1939; Tri-State: 1965, (Note: Finished tied for first place with Wagner and won playoff game for conference championship, 78–69, on March 3, 1965.) 1966, 1967; NEC: 1983, 1984, 1997, 1998, 2011, 2012 LIU Post Pioneers; ECC: 1990, 1991, 2003, 2008, 2009, 2012 LIU Sharks; NEC: 2026

NIT champions
- 1939, 1941
Note
- ^{^} = LIU Sharks^{#} = LIU Brooklyn Blackbirds * = LIU Post Pioneers

The LIU Sharks men's basketball team represents Long Island University in NCAA Division I basketball competition. They play their home games in the Steinberg Wellness Center at their Brooklyn Campus and Barclays Center and are members of the Northeast Conference. Their current head coach is Rod Strickland who was hired in June 2022. The Sharks have appeared eight times in the NCAA tournament, most recently in 2026.

The LIU Sharks are the result of the July 1, 2019 unification of the athletic departments which had previously represented two separate campuses of LIU, the Division I LIU Brooklyn Blackbirds and the Division II LIU Post Pioneers.

== History ==
=== Coaching history ===
No.	Tenure	Coach	Years	Record	Pct.
1	1928–1930	Herbert Raubenheimer	2	24–22	.522
2	1930–1931	Arthur Carroll	1	15–3	.833
3	1931–1951	Clair Bee	18	360–80	.818
4	1943–1945	George Wolfe	2	26–8	.765
5	1965–1972	Roy Rubin	7	122–55	.689
6	1972–1975	Ron Smalls	3	39–36	.520
7	1975–1995	Paul Lizzo	20	245–308	.443
8	1995–1998	Ray Haskins	3	51–39	.567
9	1998–2002	Ray Martin	4	30–61	.330
10	2002–2002	Ron Brown^	1	5–13	.278
11	2002–2012	Jim Ferry	10	150–149	.502
12	2012–2017	Jack Perri^	5	77–79	.494
13	2017–2022	Derek Kellogg	5	74–74	.500
14	2022–present	Rod Strickland	4	51–74	.408
Totals		14 coaches	84 seasons	1,269–1,001	.559
Records updated through end of 2025–26 season Source; *Alum^Promoted from assistant to head coach

=== Blackbirds ===
LIU Brooklyn Blackbirds

The LIU Brooklyn Blackbirds team represented the Brooklyn campus of LIU. Following Long Island University's founding in 1927, it soon entered intercollegiate athletic competition. Initially, its sports teams wore blue uniforms and became known as the Blue Devils. In 1935, a Brooklyn Eagle reporter saw the basketball team in its new black uniforms and stated that the team looked like blackbirds, and a new nickname was born.

LIU was a national basketball powerhouse in the 1930s and 1940s under Clair Bee, who compiled a notable winning percentage. The 1938–39 and 1940–41 teams both won the National Invitational Tournament with the latter team retroactively named a national champion by the Helms Athletic Foundation. The 1935–36 team, the 1938–1939 team, and the 1940–1941 team were all retroactively ranked as the season's top team by the Premo-Porretta Power Poll. This poll is not recognized by the NCAA.

After several players were implicated in the point-shaving scandal of 1951, LIU shuttered its entire athletic program. It returned as a member of the College Division (now Division II) in 1957. At the same time as the Blackbirds returned, LIU's C.W. Post College Pioneers began competing in the College Division as well with the athletic identity renamed LIU Post in 2012.

The Blackbirds joined the Tri-State Collegiate Basketball League, a conference that included only College Division teams, for the 1959–60 season. In 1965, they finished tied for first place with Wagner, and the teams met in a playoff game on Hofstra's home court on March 3, to determine the conference champion and winner of the league's automatic bid to the NCAA tournament. Led by George Barbezat and Al Grant, the Blackbirds overcame a 14-point deficit to defeat Wagner, 78–69.

Prior to the 1965–66 season, the Blackbirds became a charter member of the Metropolitan Collegiate Conference, a league that included both University Division and College Division teams, and competed in both the Tri-State and Met conferences through the end of the 1966–67 season, after which the Tri-State League dissolved.

The Blackbirds repeated as Tri-State League champions in 1966, earning a second automatic berth to the NCAA tournament. Larry Newbold scored 22 points to lead the Blackbirds to an 87–74 home victory over Bridgeport on February 13, 1967, completing a perfect conference season for LIU and clinching their third straight Tri-State League title and NCAA tournament berth.

LIU reclassified to the University Division (the predecessor to Division I) for the 1968–69 season. The Met Conference dissolved following the 1968–69 season.

The Blackbirds became a charter member of the Northeast Conference, then known as the ECAC Metro Conference, in 1981.

On March 12, 2013, the team achieved what was the greatest run in Northeast Conference history with a third straight NCAA tournament bid.

The Blackbirds' final head coach was Derek Kellogg, who was hired after his firing by Massachusetts in 2017, with the 2017–18 season his first as LIU mentor.

In October 2018, LIU announced that it would merge its two existing athletic programs—the LIU Brooklyn Blackbirds and LIU Post Pioneers, the latter an NCAA Division II member—effective with the 2019–20 school year. The merged athletic program now competes as the LIU Sharks, with the new colors of blue and gold, with Kellogg becoming the Sharks' first head men's basketball coach. The Sharks inherited the Division I and Northeast Conference memberships formerly held by the Blackbirds.

== Postseason ==
=== NCAA Division I tournament results ===
Long Island has appeared in the NCAA Division I tournament eight times, the first seven coming as LIU Brooklyn. Their combined record is 0–8.

Year	Seed	Round	Opponent	Result
1981	#12	First round	#5 VCU	L 69–85
1984	#11	Preliminary Round	#11 Northeastern	L 87–90
1997	#13	First round	#4 Villanova	L 91–101
2011	#15	First round	#2 North Carolina	L 87–102
2012	#16	First round	#1 Michigan State	L 67–89
2013	#16	First Four	#16 James Madison	L 55–68
2018	#16	First Four	#16 Radford	L 61–71
2026	#16	First round	#1 Arizona	L 58–92

=== NCAA Division II tournament results ===
The Blackbirds appeared in the NCAA Division II tournament three times. Their combined record was 6–3.

Year	Round	Opponent	Result
1965	Regional semifinals Regional Finals	Cheyney; Philadelphia Textile	W 57–48; L 58–61
1966	Regional semifinals Regional Finals; Elite Eight	Drexel; Cheyney; Akron	W 62–54; W 67–64; L 68–74
1967	Regional Quarterfinals; Regional semifinals Regional Finals; Elite Eight	Rochester; Central Connecticut State; Saint Michael's; Winston-Salem State	W 85–76; W 114–66; W 72–64; L 54–62

=== NIT results ===
The Blackbirds appeared in the National Invitation Tournament (NIT) ten times. Their combined record was 7–8 and they were NIT champions in 1939 and 1941.

Year	Round	Opponent	Result
1938	Quarterfinals	NYU	L 37–39
1939	Quarterfinals; Semifinals; Championship Game	New Mexico A&M; Bradley; Loyola (IL)	W 52–45; W 36–33; W 45–32
1940	Quarterfinals	DePaul	L 38–45
1941	Quarterfinals; Semifinals; Championship Game	Westminster; Seton Hall; Ohio	W 48–36; W 49–26; W 56–42
1942	Quarterfinals	West Virginia	L 49–58
1947	Quarterfinals	Kentucky	L 62–66
1950	Quarterfinals	Syracuse	L 52–80
1968	First round Quarterfinals	Bradley; Notre Dame	W 80–77; L 60–62
1982	First round	Illinois	L 78–126
1998	First round	Dayton	L 92–95

Beginning in the 1975–76 season, an annual Battle of Brooklyn was a tradition for the LIU Brooklyn Blackbirds and St. Francis Brooklyn Terriers men's basketball teams. Each season, a game was dedicated in tribute to William Lai and Daniel Lynch, former athletic directors at Long Island University and St. Francis College, respectively. The most valuable player of the game was given the Lai-Lynch Trophy in memory of the two ADs. Long Island's record was 27–21 in Battle of Brooklyn games. St. Francis won the final game in 2023. St. Francis Brooklyn discontinued sponsorship of intercollegiate athletics after the 2022–23 season, bringing the series between the two schools to an end.

== Notable players ==
- Jules Bender (1914–1982), basketball player in the American Basketball League
- Charles Jones (born 1975), NBA basketball player
- Barry Leibowitz (born 1945), American-Israeli basketball player in the American Basketball Association and the Israeli Basketball Premier League
- Carey Scurry (born 1962), NBA basketball player
- Tronn Hansen (born 1979), American Basketball Association 2000 basketball player from Norway
