= Mount St. Mary's Mountaineers men's basketball statistical leaders =

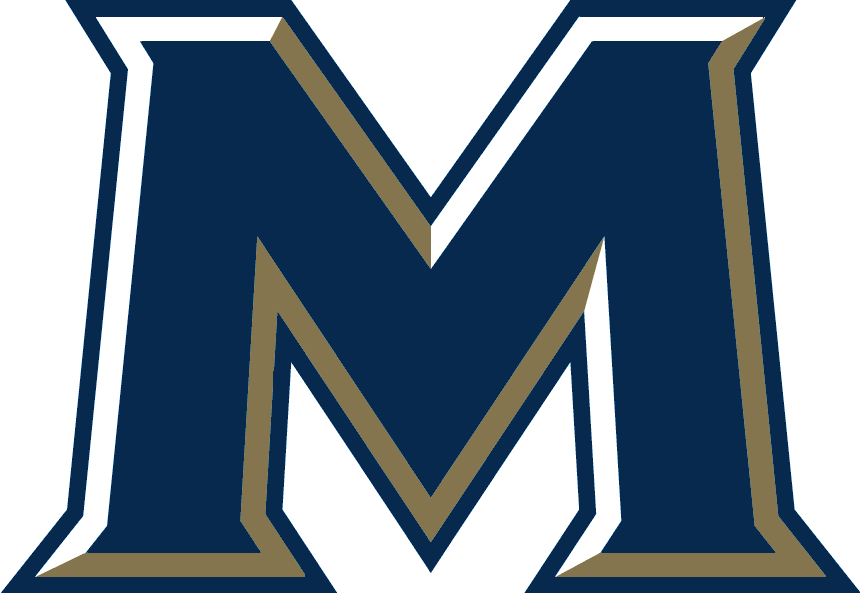

The Mount St. Mary's Mountaineers men's basketball statistical leaders are individual statistical leaders of the Mount St. Mary's Mountaineers men's basketball program in various categories, including points, assists, blocks, rebounds, and steals. Within those areas, the lists identify single-game, single-season, and career leaders. The Mountaineers represent Mount St. Mary's University in the NCAA Division I Metro Atlantic Athletic Conference.

Mount St. Mary's began competing in intercollegiate basketball in 1908. However, the school's record book does not generally list records from before the 1950s, as records from before this period are often incomplete and inconsistent. Since scoring was much lower in this era, and teams played much fewer games during a typical season, it is likely that few or no players from this era would appear on these lists anyway.

The NCAA did not officially record assists as a stat until the 1983–84 season, and blocks and steals until the 1985–86 season, but Mount St. Mary's record books includes players in these stats before these seasons. These lists are updated through the end of the 2019–20 season.

== Scoring ==
Career
Rk	Player	Points	Seasons
1	Jack Sullivan	2672	1953–54 1954–55 1955–56 1956–57
2	Chris McGuthrie	2297	1992–93 1993–94 1994–95 1995–96
3	Junior Robinson	1872	2014–15 2015–16 2016–17 2017–18
4	Fred Carter	1840	1965–66 1966–67 1967–68 1968–69
5	Mike Cataline	1838	1972–73 1973–74 1974–75 1975–76
6	Jim Rowe	1765	1977–78 1978–79 1979–80 1980–81
7	Gregory Harris	1760	1996–97 1997–98 1998–99 1999–00
8	Kevin Booth	1741	1988–89 1989–90 1990–91 1991–92 1992–93
9	Landy Thompson	1733	2002–03 2003–04 2004–05 2005–06
10	Jeremy Goode	1716	2006–07 2007–08 2008–09 2009–10

Season
Rk	Player	Points	Season
1	Jack Sullivan	1070	1956–57
2	Junior Robinson	703	2017–18
3	Jack Sullivan	684	1954–55
4	Chris McGuthrie	647	1995–96
5	Fred Carter	627	1965–66
6	John O'Reilly	613	1960–61
7	Les Cosgrove	596	1950–51
8	Chris McGuthrie	592	1994–95
	Mike Cataline	592	1975–76
10	Rashad Whack	582	2013–14

Single game
Rk	Player	Points	Season	Opponent
1	Jack Sullivan	55	1956–57	Baltimore
2	Jack Sullivan	51	1956–57	Washington (Md.)
3	Dave Maloney	49	1962–63	American
4	Jack Sullivan	48	1956–57	North Carolina Central
5	Jack Sullivan	44	1954–55	St. Peter's
	Jack Sullivan	44	1953–54	Baltimore
	Jack Sullivan	44	1955–56	Loyola
	Jack Sullivan	44	1956–57	Georgetown
	Jack Sullivan	44	1956–57	St. Francis (Pa.)
	Mike Tate	44	1987–88	Kutztown
	Sam Prescott	44	2012–13	Bryant

== Rebounds ==
Career
Rk	Player	Rebounds	Seasons
1	Bob Sutor	1368	1965–66 1966–67 1967–68 1968–69 1969–70
2	Sal Angelo	1334	1952–53 1953–54 1954–55
3	Jack Sullivan	1216	1953–54 1954–55 1955–56 1956–57
4	Bill Williams	1154	1954–55 1955–56 1956–57 1957–58
5	John O'Reilly	1113	1960–61 1961–62 1962–63
6	Bob Riley	934	1966–67 1967–68 1968–69 1969–70
7	Steve Rossignoli	912	1977–78 1978–79 1979–80 1980–81
8	Fred Carter	910	1965–66 1966–67 1967–68 1968–69
9	Jerry Bohlinger	893	1955–56 1956–57 1957–58 1958–59
10	Rick Kidwell	851	1972–73 1973–74 1974–75 1975–76

Season
Rk	Player	Rebounds	Season
1	Sal Angelo	609	1952–53
2	John O'Reilly	429	1961–62
3	Bob Sutor	424	1966–67
4	Bill Williams	421	1956–57
5	John O'Reilly	400	1960–61
6	Sal Angelo	390	1954–55
7	Bob Sutor	368	1969–70
8	Jack Sullivan	350	1956–57
9	Sal Angelo	335	1953–54
10	Jack Sullivan	334	1954–55

Single game
Rk	Player	Rebounds	Season	Opponent
1	Sal Angelo	34	1952–53	Gettysburg
2	Bob Sutor	29	1966–67	Loyola
	Bob Sutor	29	1969–70	Towson State
4	John O'Reilly	28	1962–63	Loyola
	Bob Sutor	28	1966–67	Shippensburg
6	John O'Reilly	27	1961–62	St. Joseph's
7	Sal Angelo	26	1952–53	Loyola
8	Bill McDermott	25	1962–63	Catholic
9	Sal Angelo	24	1952–53	American
10	John O'Reilly	23	1962–63	Roanoke
	John O'Reilly	23	1962–63	Catholic
	Bob Sutor	23	1969–70	Grove City

== Assists ==
Career
Rk	Player	Assists	Seasons
1	Jeremy Goode	603	2006–07 2007–08 2008–09 2009–10
2	Gregory Harris	529	1996–97 1997–98 1998–99 1999–00
3	John Moore	471	1984–85 1985–86 1986–87 1987–88
4	Riley Inge	466	1993–94 1994–95 1995–96
5	Marlon Cook	463	1981–82 1982–83 1983–84 1984–85
6	Junior Robinson	457	2014–15 2015–16 2016–17 2017–18
7	Alex Watson	450	1987–88 1988–89 1989–90 1990–91
8	Chris McGuthrie	426	1992–93 1993–94 1994–95 1995–96
9	Julian Norfleet	423	2010–11 2011–12 2012–13 2013–14
10	Paul Edwards	373	1982–83 1983–84 1984–85 1985–86 1986–87
	Mike Tate	373	1985–86 1986–87 1987–88 1988–89

Season
Rk	Player	Assists	Season
1	Marlon Cook	225	1983–84
2	John Moore	204	1986–87
3	Jeremy Goode	182	2007–08
4	Julian Norfleet	181	2013–14
5	Alex Watson	173	1990–91
6	John Moore	171	1987–88
7	Marlon Cook	168	1984–85
8	Riley Inge	167	1995–96
9	Elijah Long	157	2016–17
10	Gregory Harris	156	1997–98
	Xavier Lipscomb	156	2024–25

Single game
Rk	Player	Assists	Season	Opponent
1	Jay Gallagher	15	1976–77	UMBC
	Riley Inge	15	1993–94	Robert Morris
3	Durelle Lewis	14	1981–82	Frostburg State
	Marlon Cook	14	1983–84	Pittsburgh-Johnstown
	Alex Watson	14	1990–91	Colgate
6	George Young	13	1982–83	Radford
	Marlon Cook	13	1984–85	Shippensburg
	Cliff Warren	13	1989–90	Navy
	Alex Watson	13	1989–90	Wagner
	Alex Watson	13	1990–91	North Carolina State
	Riley Inge	13	1993–94	Long Island
	Xavier Lipscomb	13	2024–25	Sacred Heart

== Steals ==
Career
Rk	Player	Steals	Seasons
1	Paul Edwards	316	1982–83 1983–84 1984–85 1985–86 1986–87
2	Jeremy Goode	260	2006–07 2007–08 2008–09 2009–10
3	Darryle Edwards	226	1981–82 1982–83 1983–84 1984–85
4	Gregory Harris	205	1996–97 1997–98 1998–99 1999–00
5	Riley Inge	204	1993–94 1994–95 1995–96
6	John Moore	202	1984–85 1985–86 1986–87 1987–88
	Chris McGuthrie	202	1992–93 1993–94 1994–95 1995–96
8	Alex Watson	198	1987–88 1988–89 1989–90 1990–91
9	George Young	197	1982–83 1983–84 1984–85 1985–86
10	Mike Tate	194	1985–86 1986–87 1987–88 1988–89

Season
Rk	Player	Steals	Season
1	Paul Edwards	102	1985–86
2	Paul Edwards	99	1984–85
3	Paul Edwards	92	1986–87
4	Durelle Lewis	84	1981–82
	John Moore	84	1986–87
6	Riley Inge	79	1995–96
7	Jeremy Goode	77	2009–10
8	Riley Inge	76	1994–95
9	Alex Watson	72	1990–91
10	Darryle Edwards	71	1983–84

Single game
Rk	Player	Steals	Season	Opponent
1	Durelle Lewis	11	1979–80	Glassboro State
2	Lee Hicks	10	1987–88	Bloomsburg
3	Paul Edwards	9	1984–85	Widener
	Paul Edwards	9	1985–86	UMBC
	Alex Watson	9	1990–91	Fairleigh Dickinson
	Riley Inge	9	1995–96	St. Francis Brooklyn
7	Paul Edwards	7	1984–85	District of Columbia
	Paul Edwards	7	1985–86	Bloomsburg
	Paul Edwards	7	1985–86	Widener
	Paul Edwards	7	1985–86	Merrimack
	Paul Edwards	7	1986–87	Lock Haven
	Jeremy Goode	7	2007–08	Loyola

== Blocks ==
Career
Rk	Player	Blocks	Seasons
1	Mike Grimes	231	1984–85 1985–86 1986–87 1987–88
2	Gerben Van Dorpe	195	1994–95 1995–96 1996–97 1997–98
3	Nana Opoku	194	2017–18 2018–19 2019–20 2020–21 2021–22
4	Chris Wray	141	2014–15 2015–16 2016–17 2017–18
5	Michael Watson	140	1991–92 1992–93 1993–94 1994–95
6	Taylor Danaher	127	2012–13 2013–14 2014–15 2015–16
7	Sam Atupem	126	2005–06 2006–07 2007–08 2008–09
8	Alex Watson	123	1987–88 1988–89 1989–90 1990–91
9	Angel Rivera	120	1999–00 2000–01 2001–02 2002–03
10	Kelly Beidler	107	2006–07 2007–08 2008–09 2009–10

Season
Rk	Player	Blocks	Season
1	Mike Grimes	73	1986–87
2	Gerben Van Dorpe	72	1995–96
3	Angelo Frazier	70	1981–82
	Gerben Van Dorpe	70	1997–98
5	Mike Grimes	69	1985–86
6	Melvin Whitaker	63	1998–99
7	Mike Grimes	55	1987–88
8	Chris Wray	54	2016–17
9	Michael Watson	53	1993–94
10	Nana Opoku	51	2019–20

Single game
Rk	Player	Blocks	Season	Opponent
1	Randy Edney	11	1993–94	Long Island
2	Gerben Van Dorpe	10	1995–96	Rider
3	Nana Opoku	9	2018–19	Saint Francis U
4	Angelo Frazier	8	1979–80	District of Columbia
	Michael Watson	8	1993–94	St. Francis Brooklyn
	Melvin Whitaker	8	1998–99	Cent. Conn. State
