= Donald Carey =

American basketball player (born 1999)

No. 12 – Forlì 2.015
- Position: Shooting guard
- League: Serie A2

Personal information
- Born: August 21, 1999 (age 27) Upper Marlboro, Maryland, U.S.
- Listed height: 6 ft 5 in (1.96 m)
- Listed weight: 190 lb (86 kg)

Career information
- High school: Frederick Douglass (Upper Marlboro, Maryland)
- College: Mount Saint Mary's (2017–2018); Siena (2019–2020); Georgetown (2020–2022); Maryland (2022–2023)
- NBA draft: 2023: undrafted
- Playing career: 2023–present

Career history
- 2023–2025: Maine Celtics
- 2025: Otago Nuggets
- 2025: Leicester Riders
- 2026: Rayos de Hermosillo
- 2026–present: Forlì 2.015

Donald Carey Jr. (born August 21, 1999) is an American professional basketball player for Pallacanestro Forlì 2.015 of the Italian Serie A2. He played college basketball for the Mount Saint Mary's Mountaineers, the Siena Saints, the Georgetown Hoyas, and the Maryland Terrapins.

== Early life and high school ==
Carey attended Frederick Douglass High School. He originally planned to play in the AAU Circuit in the summer and move on to prep school at Massanutten Military Academy but decided to commit to Mount Saint Mary's University.

== College career ==
=== Mount Saint Mary's (2017-2018) ===
In May 2017, Carey committed to Mount Saint Mary's University for the 2017-2018 season under coach Jamion Christian.

=== Siena (2018-2020) ===
On June 5, 2018, Carey transferred to Siena College to join Christian, who had been his coach at Mount Saint Mary's. He sat out the 2018-2019 season due to NCAA transfer rules. In 2019-20, Carey appeared in all 30 games, starting 28, with averages of 11.3 points, 3.3 rebounds, and 2.4 assists per game. On July 10, 2020, he announced his intention to transfer.

=== Georgetown (2020-2022) ===
On December 20, 2021, Carey was named to the Big East Honor Roll after averaging 13 points, 6.5 rebounds, 4 assists and 3.5 steals.

Carey was also given the Big East Sportsmanship Award, becoming third recipient of the award in Georgetown history.

On April 28, 2022, Carey entered the NCAA transfer portal.

=== Maryland (2022-2023) ===
On May 13, 2022, Carey committed to University of Maryland after going through the NBA Draft process. He officially signed with Maryland on July 21.

== Professional career ==
=== Maine Celtics (2023-2025) ===
For the 2023-2024 season, Carey signed with the Maine Celtics after being acquired through the 2023 Tryouts.

=== Otago Nuggets (2025) ===
In 2025, Carey signed with the Otago Nuggets for the 2025 season. At the conclusion of the 2025 season, Carey earned All-New Zealand League Honorable Mention from australiabasket.com.

=== Leicester Riders (2025-present) ===
On October 17, 2025, Carey signed with the Leicester Riders for the 2025-2026 season.

== Personal life ==
Carey is the son of Donald Sr. and Crystal Carey. He has an older brother, Jamall Robinson, who played basketball at Hofstra University and LIU Brooklyn. He has two younger sisters. Carey's cousin is Kyle Anderson.
