= 1994–95 Mount St. Mary's Mountaineers men's basketball team =

American college basketball season

1994–95 Mount St. Mary's Mountaineers men's basketball
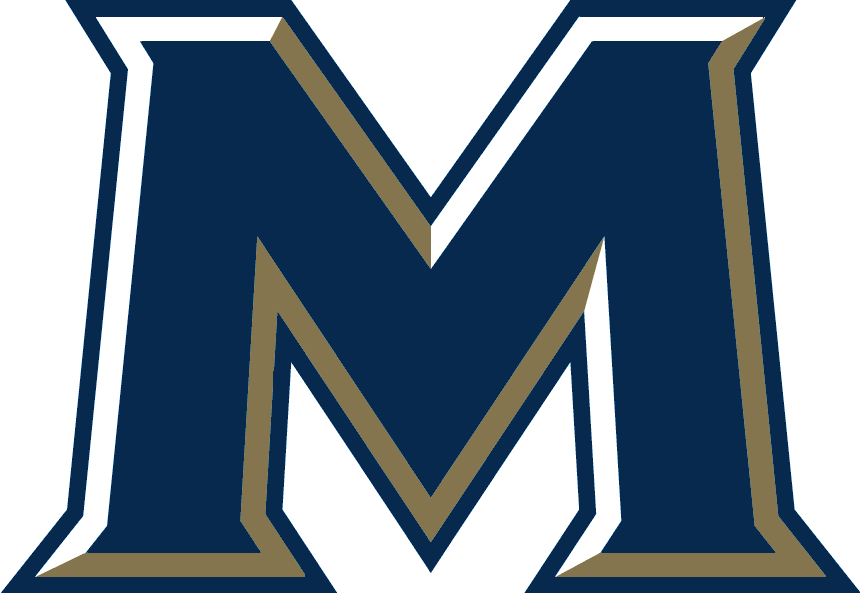

NEC tournament champions

NCAA tournament, first round
- Conference: Northeast Conference
- Record: 17–13 (12–6 NEC)
- Head coach: Jim Phelan (41st season)
- Home arena: Knott Arena

1994–95 Northeast Conference men's basketball standings
	Conf.				Overall
Team	W		L	PCT	W		L	PCT
Rider	13	–	5	.722	18	–	11	.621
Mount St. Mary's †	12	–	6	.667	17	–	13	.567
Marist	12	–	6	.667	17	–	11	.607
Monmouth	11	–	7	.611	13	–	14	.481
Fairleigh Dickinson	11	–	7	.611	16	–	12	.571
Wagner	9	–	9	.500	10	–	17	.370
Long Island	8	–	10	.444	11	–	17	.393
Saint Francis (PA)	7	–	11	.389	12	–	16	.429
St. Francis Brooklyn	5	–	13	.278	9	–	18	.333
Robert Morris	2	–	16	.111	4	–	23	.148
† 1995 NEC tournament winner

The 1994–95 Mount St. Mary's Mountaineers men's basketball team represented Mount St. Mary's University during the 1994–95 NCAA Division I men's basketball season. The Mountaineers, led by head coach Jim Phelan, played their home games at Knott Arena and were members of the Northeast Conference. They finished the season 17–13, 12–6 in NEC play to finish in a tie for second place. They were champions of the NEC tournament to earn an automatic bid to the NCAA tournament. Playing as the No. 16 seed in the Southeast region, the Mountaineers lost to No. 1 seed Kentucky in the Round of 64.

== Roster ==
1994–95 Mount St. Mary's Mountaineers men's basketball team
Players
Coaches

Pos.	#	Name	Height	Weight	Year	Hometown
G		Chris McGuthrie	5 ft 9 in (1.75 m)	165 lb (75 kg)	Jr	Washington, D.C.
G		Riley Inge	6 ft 3 in (1.91 m)	—	Jr

Head coach

- Jim Phelan

Assistant coach(es)

Legend

- (C) Team captain
- (S) Suspended
- (I) Ineligible
- (W) Walk-on
- Injured
- Current redshirt

== Schedule and results ==
Date time, TV	Rank^{#}	Opponent^{#}	Result	Record	Site (attendance) city, state
Non-conference Regular season
Nov 25, 1994*		at Penn State	L 60–90	0–1	Rec Hall; University Park, Pennsylvania
Nov 29, 1994*		Towson	L 68–69	0–2	Knott Arena; Emmitsburg, Maryland
Dec 3, 1994*		Catholic	W 89–72	1–2	Knott Arena; Emmitsburg, Maryland
Dec 17, 1994*		at Loyola (MD)	W 78–65	2–2	Reitz Arena; Baltimore, Maryland
Dec 19, 1994*		at Oklahoma	L 67–91	2–3	Lloyd Noble Center; Norman, Oklahoma
Dec 21, 1994*		at San Francisco	L 91–120	2–4	War Memorial Gymnasium; San Francisco, California
Dec 28, 1994*		at VCU	L 55–79	2–5	Richmond Coliseum; Richmond, Virginia
Dec 30, 1994*		La Salle	L 65–68	2–6	Knott Arena; Emmitsburg, Maryland
NEC Regular season
Jan 3, 1995		Fairleigh Dickinson	W 89–69	3–6 (1–0)	Knott Arena; Emmitsburg, Maryland
Feb 25, 1995		at Fairleigh Dickinson	L 64–80	14–12 (12–6)	Rothman Center; Hackensack, New Jersey
Northeast Conference tournament
Feb 28, 1995*		Long Island; Quarterfinals	W 68–67	15–12	Knott Arena; Emmitsburg, Maryland
Mar 1, 1995*		Marist; Semifinals	W 84–79	16–12	Knott Arena; Emmitsburg, Maryland
Mar 2, 1995*		at Rider; Championship game	W 69–62	17–12	Alumni Gymnasium; Lawrenceville, New Jersey
NCAA tournament
Mar 16, 1995*	(16 SE)	vs. (1 SE) No. 2 Kentucky; First round	L 67–113	17–13	Pyramid Arena (19,120); Memphis, Tennessee
*Non-conference game. ^{#}Rankings from AP Poll, (#) during NCAA Tournament is seed within region S=South. (#) Tournament seedings in parentheses. All times are in Eastern Time.
