= 1995 Northeast Conference men's basketball tournament =

- Classification: Division I
- Season: 1994–95
- Teams: 10
- Finals site: Alumni Gymnasium; Lawrenceville, NJ
- Champions: Mount St. Mary's (1st title)
- Winning coach: Jim Phelan (1st title)
- MVP: Silas Cheung (Mount St. Mary's)

The 14th Northeast Conference men's basketball tournament was held in March 1995. The tournament featured the league's ten teams, seeded based on their conference record. Mount St. Mary's won the championship, their first, and received the conference's automatic bid to the 1995 NCAA Tournament.

1994–95 Northeast Conference men's basketball standings
	Conf.				Overall
Team	W		L	PCT	W		L	PCT
Rider	13	–	5	.722	18	–	11	.621
Mount St. Mary's †	12	–	6	.667	17	–	13	.567
Marist	12	–	6	.667	17	–	11	.607
Monmouth	11	–	7	.611	13	–	14	.481
Fairleigh Dickinson	11	–	7	.611	16	–	12	.571
Wagner	9	–	9	.500	10	–	17	.370
Long Island	8	–	10	.444	11	–	17	.393
Saint Francis (PA)	7	–	11	.389	12	–	16	.429
St. Francis Brooklyn	5	–	13	.278	9	–	18	.333
Robert Morris	2	–	16	.111	4	–	23	.148
† 1995 NEC tournament winner

== Format ==
The NEC Men's Basketball Tournament consisted of a ten-team playoff format with all games played at the venue of the higher seed. The first round was played by the four lowest seeds (7–10) and the other teams received a bye.

== Bracket ==
First round
8	Saint Francis (PA)	95
9	St. Francis Brooklyn	76
7	Long Island	87
10	Robert Morris	80

Quarterfinals
1	Rider	95
8	Saint Francis (PA)	76
4	Monmouth	71
5	Fairleigh Dickinson	73
2	Mount St. Mary's	68
10	Long Island	67
3	Marist	91
6	Wagner	75

Semifinals
1	Rider	76
5	Fairleigh Dickinson	65
2	Mount St. Mary's	84
3	Marist	79

Championship Game
1	Rider	62
2	Mount St. Mary's	69

== All-tournament team ==
Tournament MVP in bold.

**1995 NEC All-Tournament Team**

**Silas Cheung**, MSM
Randy Edney, MSM
Joe Griffin, LIU
Deon Hames, RID
Riley Inge, MSM
Charles Smith, RID
