= YMCA Basketball Museum =

Sports museum in Thessaloniki, Greece

The YMCA Basketball Museum (Greek: Μουσείο Μπάσκετ Χ.Α.Ν.Θ.) is a sports museum in Thessaloniki, Greece, dedicated to basketball. Established in 2013 focus on the documention and exhibition of material related to basketball in Greece and Greek basketball players, as well as highlighting the role of the YMCA Thessaloniki (Greek: Χ.Α.Ν.Θ.) in the development and dissemination of sports education in Greece. It is referred as the country's sole basketball museum.

== History ==
Initial discussions about the establishment of a basketball museum in Thessaloniki started in 2002, when the demolition of the historic YMCA Thessaloniki outdoor basketball court occurred because of the construction of organisation's new facilities. The museum was created through a co-funded Interreg programme. For that purpose, the YMCA Thessaloniki collaborated with the Blagoevgrad-based Bulgarian South-West University Neofit Rilski from 2012 to 2013.

The museum was inaugurated on 8 December 2013 in the presence of prominent former players of the YMCA Thessaloniki BC, including Lakis Tsavas, Alekos Tryfonidis, Theodoros Rodopoulos and Michalis Giannouzakos. In subsequent years, the museum was expanded in 2016, 2019 and 2025.

Exhibits from the museum’s collection.

== Building and exhibitions ==
The Basketball Museum is dedicated to Louis Rees (1887–1946), an American YMCA executive who was the first educator and promoter of basketball in Greece. It is located within the YMCA Thessaloniki facilities, inside the Mimis Tsikinas Indoor Hall, on the same site as the demolished outdoor basketball court.

The museum includes thematic sections about: the history of basketball in Greece (with the YMCA Thessaloniki as the central focus), the Greece national basketball team, the official governing bodies of Greek basketball (HBF and ESAKE), and the founding members of the local Basketball Clubs Association (EKASTH).

The collections include archival material, objects donated by prominent athletes and other figures associated with basketball, sports clothing and footwear, medals, trophies and awards, equipment from the former outdoor basketball court, game tickets, objects signed by Greek international players, and various memorabilia donated by clubs, sportspeople, referees and other sources. In addition to its collections, the museum also organises and houses educational programmes.
