= 1999 Northeast Conference men's basketball tournament =

- Classification: Division I
- Season: 1998–99
- Teams: 8
- Site: Spiro Sports Center; Staten Island, NY
- Champions: Mount St. Mary's (2nd title)
- Winning coach: Jim Phelan (2nd title)
- MVP: Gregory Harris (Mount St. Mary's)

The 1999 Northeast Conference men's basketball tournament was held in March. The tournament featured the league's top eight seeds. Mount St. Mary's won the championship, their second, and received the conference's automatic bid to the 1999 NCAA Tournament.

1998–99 Northeast Conference men's basketball standings
	Conf.				Overall
Team	W		L	PCT	W		L	PCT
UMBC	17	–	3	.850	19	–	9	.679
St. Francis Brooklyn	16	–	4	.800	20	–	8	.714
Robert Morris	12	–	8	.600	15	–	12	.556
Central Connecticut	11	–	9	.550	19	–	13	.594
Long Island	10	–	10	.500	10	–	17	.370
Mount St. Mary's†	10	–	10	.500	15	–	15	.500
Fairleigh Dickinson	9	–	11	.450	12	–	16	.429
Wagner	7	–	13	.350	9	–	18	.333
Saint Francis (PA)	7	–	13	.350	9	–	17	.346
Quinnipiac	6	–	14	.300	9	–	18	.333
Monmouth	5	–	15	.250	5	–	21	.192
† 1999 NEC tournament winner

== Format ==
The NEC Men’s Basketball Tournament consisted of an eight-team playoff format with all games played at the Spiro Sports Center in Staten Island, NY.

== Bracket ==
Quarterfinals
1	UMBC	63
8	Wagner	56
4	Central Connecticut	67
5	Long Island	58
2	St. Francis Brooklyn	65
7	Fairleigh Dickinson	58
3	Robert Morris	63
6	Mount St. Mary's	80

Semifinals
1	UMBC	72
4	Central Connecticut	82
2	St. Francis Brooklyn	66
6	Mount St. Mary's	68

Championship Game
4	Central Connecticut	56
6	Mount St. Mary's	72

== All-tournament team ==
Tournament MVP in bold.

**1999 NEC All-Tournament Team**

**Gregory Harris**, MSM
Corsley Edwards, CCSU
Ray Minlend, SFNY
Terence Ward, UMBC
Charron Watson, CCSU
Melvin Whitaker, MSM
