= 1994–95 St. Francis Terriers men's basketball team =

American college basketball season

1994–95 St. Francis Terriers men's basketball
- Conference: Northeast Conference
- Record: 9–18 (5–13 NEC)
- Head coach: Ron Ganulin (4th season)
- Assistant coach: Glenn Braica (6th season)
- Home arena: Generoso Pope Athletic Complex

1994–95 Northeast Conference men's basketball standings
	Conf.				Overall
Team	W		L	PCT	W		L	PCT
Rider	13	–	5	.722	18	–	11	.621
Mount St. Mary's †	12	–	6	.667	17	–	13	.567
Marist	12	–	6	.667	17	–	11	.607
Monmouth	11	–	7	.611	13	–	14	.481
Fairleigh Dickinson	11	–	7	.611	16	–	12	.571
Wagner	9	–	9	.500	10	–	17	.370
Long Island	8	–	10	.444	11	–	17	.393
Saint Francis (PA)	7	–	11	.389	12	–	16	.429
St. Francis Brooklyn	5	–	13	.278	9	–	18	.333
Robert Morris	2	–	16	.111	4	–	23	.148
† 1995 NEC tournament winner

The 1994–95 St. Francis Terriers men's basketball team represented St. Francis College during the 1994–95 NCAA Division I men's basketball season. The team was coached by Ron Ganulin, who was in his fourth year at the helm of the St. Francis Terriers. The Terrier's home games were played at the Generoso Pope Athletic Complex. The team has been a member of the Northeast Conference since 1981.

The Terriers finished their season at 9–18 overall and 5–13 in conference play. The Terriers played as the 9th seed in the NEC Tournament and lost in the first round against 8th seed Saint Francis (PA), 76–95.

== Roster ==
1994–95 St. Francis Brooklyn Terriers men's basketball team
Players
Coaches

Pos.	#	Name	Height	Weight	Year	Hometown
F		Ivan Patterson	6 ft 4 in (1.93 m)	—	Sr
C		Haluk Ayata	6 ft 8 in (2.03 m)	—	Sr
G		Matt MacGregor	6 ft 1 in (1.85 m)	—	Sr
C		Marlon Lewis	6 ft 8 in (2.03 m)	—	Jr
F		Chris Ortiz	6 ft 5 in (1.96 m)	—	Jr
G		Robert Bailey	6 ft 1 in (1.85 m)	—	Jr
F		Abdu-Allah Torrence	6 ft 7 in (2.01 m)	—	So
F		Andre Ollivierra	6 ft 5 in (1.96 m)	—	So
G		Lormont Sharp	6 ft 1 in (1.85 m)	—	Fr
G	14	Solomon Abel	5 ft 11 in (1.8 m)	175 lb (79 kg)	Fr	Bronx, New York
G		Andy Singleton	5 ft 10 in (1.78 m)	—	Fr
C		Andrew Chmiel	6 ft 9 in (2.06 m)	—	Fr
F		Mike Strochansky	6 ft 4 in (1.93 m)	—	Fr

Head coach

- Ron Ganulin (LIU Brooklyn '67)

Assistant coach(es)

- Glenn Braica (Queens College '89)

Legend

- (C) Team captain
- (S) Suspended
- (I) Ineligible
- (W) Walk-on
- Injured
- Current redshirt

== Schedule and results ==
Date time, TV	Opponent	Result	Record	Site (attendance) city, state
Regular season
December 3, 1994*	Harvard	L 68–79	0–1	Generoso Pope Athletic Complex (288); Brooklyn, NY
December 17, 1994*	Delaware State	L 103–105	0–2	Generoso Pope Athletic Complex (482); Brooklyn, NY
December 22, 1994*	Maryland Eastern Shore	W 78–74	1–2	Generoso Pope Athletic Complex (192); Brooklyn, NY
December 22, 1994*	at Central Connecticut	L 63–77	1–3	William H. Detrick Gymnasium (480); New Britain, CT
December 30, 1994*	Army	W 83–75	2–3	Generoso Pope Athletic Complex (281); Brooklyn, NY
January 5, 1995	Long Island	L 61–74	2–4 (0–1)	Generoso Pope Athletic Complex (252); Brooklyn, NY
January 7, 1995	Wagner	W 98–87	3–4 (1–1)	Generoso Pope Athletic Complex (174); Brooklyn, NY
January 9, 1995	Monmouth	L 70–82	3–5 (1–2)	Generoso Pope Athletic Complex (142); Brooklyn, NY
January 12, 1995	at Mount St. Mary's	L 70–98	3–6 (1–3)	Knott Arena (1,185); Emmitsburg, MD
January 14, 1995	at Rider	L 65–82	3–7 (1–4)	Alumni Gymnasium (1,207); Lawrenceville, NJ
January 17, 1995*	at Rutgers	L 50–97	3–8	Louis Brown Athletic Center (2,869); Piscataway, NJ
January 19, 1995	Fairleigh Dickinson	L 76–79	3–9 (1–5)	Generoso Pope Athletic Complex (195); Brooklyn, NY
January 21, 1995	Marist	L 54–93	3–10 (1–6)	Generoso Pope Athletic Complex (524); Brooklyn, NY
January 26, 1995	at Saint Francis (PA)	W 55–52	4–10 (2–6)	Maurice Stokes Athletic Center (952); Loretto, PA
January 28, 1995	at Robert Morris	W 83–70	5–10 (3–6)	Charles L. Sewall Center (884); Moon Township, PA
January 31, 1995*	Yale	W 87–77	6–10	Generoso Pope Athletic Complex (216); Brooklyn, NY
February 2, 1995	at Monmouth	L 75–84	6–11 (3–7)	William T. Boylan Gymnasium (782); West Long Branch, NJ
February 4, 1995	at Wagner	L 58–75	6–12 (3–8)	Sutter Gymnasium (242); Staten Island, NY
February 7, 1995*	Central Connecticut	W 88–82	7–12	Generoso Pope Athletic Complex (215); Brooklyn, NY
February 9, 1995	Rider	L 77–82	7–13 (3–9)	Generoso Pope Athletic Complex (263); Brooklyn, NY
February 11, 1995	Mount St. Mary's	L 74–89	7–14 (3–10)	Generoso Pope Athletic Complex (206); Brooklyn, NY
February 14, 1995	at Marist	L 66–80	7–15 (3–11)	McCann Field House (1,510); Poughkeepsie, NY
February 16, 1995	at Fairleigh Dickinson	L 79–86	7–16 (3–12)	Rothman Center (816); Hackensack, NJ
February 18, 1995	Robert Morris	W 89–82	8–16 (4–12)	Generoso Pope Athletic Complex (208); Brooklyn, NY
February 20, 1995	Saint Francis (PA)	W 93–74	9–16 (5–12)	Generoso Pope Athletic Complex (354); Brooklyn, NY
February 25, 1995	at Long Island	L 109–113	9–17 (5–13)	Schwartz Athletic Center (197); Brooklyn, NY
1995 NEC tournament
February 28, 1995	at Saint Francis (PA); First Round	L 76–95	9–18	Maurice Stokes Athletic Center (405); Loretto, PA
*Non-conference game. ^{#}Rankings from AP Poll. (#) Tournament seedings in parentheses. All times are in Eastern Time.
