= 1956–57 Drexel Dragons men's basketball team =

American college basketball season

1956–57 Drexel Dragons men's basketball

MAC College–Southern regular season champions

NCAA tournament Regional semifinals, L 61–63
- Conference: Middle Atlantic Conferences
- College–Southern
- Record: 14–3 (10–0 MAC)
- Head coach: Samuel Cozen (5th season)
- Captains: Bob Buckley; Ron Kleppinger
- Home arena: Sayre High School

The 1956–57 Drexel Dragons men's basketball team represented Drexel Institute of Technology during the 1956–57 men's basketball season. The Dragons, led by 5th year head coach Samuel Cozen, played their home games at Sayre High School and were members of the College–Southern division of the Middle Atlantic Conferences (MAC). The team finished the season 14–3, and finished in 1st place in the MAC in the regular season.

The Dragons played their first postseason game in program history, losing to Rider in the first round of the NCAA College Division tournament.

== Roster ==
1956–57 Drexel Dragons men's basketball team
Players
Coaches

| Pos. | # | Name | Height | Weight | Year | Previous school | Hometown |
|---|---|---|---|---|---|---|---|
| | | Edward Moran | — | — |
| | | Cyrus Cohen | — | — |
| | | Robert Seher | — | — |
| | | Allan Weinberg | — | — |
| | | Charles Morrow | — | — |
| | | Robert Greenberg | — | — |
| | | Wayne Gutekunst | — | — |
| | | William White | — | — |
| | | Ronald Kleppinger | — | — |
| | | Lawrence Humes | — | — |
| | | Robert Buckley | — | — |
| | | George Butler | — | — |
| | | Martin Weinberg | — | — |

Head coach

- Samuel Cozen (Temple)

Assistant coach(es)

Legend

- (C) Team captain
- (S) Suspended
- (I) Ineligible
- (W) Walk-on
- Injured
- Current redshirt

Roster

== Schedule ==
| Date time, TV | Rank^{#} | Opponent^{#} | Result | Record | High points | High rebounds | High assists | Site (attendance) city, state |
Regular season
| January 7, 1957 | | at Delaware | W 75–74 | 1–0 (1–0) | 10 – White | – | – | Newark, DE |
| January 1957 | | at Ursinus | W 64–49 | 2–0 (2–0) | – | – | – | |
| January 12, 1957 | | Pennsylvania Military College | W 82–70 | 3–0 (3–0) | 17 – Campbell | – | – | Sayre High School; Philadelphia, PA |
| January 16, 1957 | | at Swarthmore | W 102–78 | 4–0 (4–0) | 33 – Buckley | 16 – Buckley | – | |
| January 19, 1957 | | Haverford | W 79–55 | 5–0 (5–0) | – | – | – | Sayre High School; Philadelphia, PA |
| January 23, 1957* | | at Millersville | L 69–100 | 5–1 | 21 – Buckley | – | – | |
| January 26, 1957* | | Coast Guard | W 97–71 | 6–1 | – | – | – | Sayre High School; Philadelphia, PA |
| Unknown* | | at Villanova | L 66–87 | 6–2 | – | – | – | |
| February 2, 1957* | | at Lebanon Valley | W 77–74 | 7–2 | – | – | – | |
| February 6, 1957 | | Delaware | W 87–60 | 8–2 (6–0) | 16 – Buckley | – | – | Sayre High School; Philadelphia, PA |
| February 9, 1957 | | Swarthmore | W 84–71 | 9–2 (7–0) | – | – | – | Sayre High School; Philadelphia, PA |
| February 13, 1957 | | at Pennsylvania Military College | W 80–63 | 10–2 (8–0) | – | – | – | Chester, PA |
| February 16, 1957 | | at Haverford | W 88–73 | 11–2 (9–0) | – | – | – | Ryan Gym; Haverford, PA |
| Unknown* | | West Chester | W 106–76 | 12–2 | – | – | – | Sayre High School; Philadelphia, PA |
| February 27, 1957 | | Ursinus | W 82–56 | 13–2 (10–0) | – | – | – | Sayre High School; Philadelphia, PA |
| March 2, 1957* | | at Franklin & Marshall | W 82–64 | 14–2 | – | – | – | |
1957 NCAA College Division basketball tournament
| March 4, 1957 | | Rider; Regional semifinals | L 61–63 | 14–3 | – | – | – | Sayre High School; Philadelphia, PA |
*Non-conference game. ^{#}Rankings from AP. (#) Tournament seedings in parentheses. All times are in Eastern Time.
