= 1998–99 St. Francis Terriers men's basketball team =

American college basketball season

1998–1999 St. Francis Terriers men's basketball
- Conference: Northeast Conference
- Record: 20–8 (16–4 NEC)
- Head coach: Ron Ganulin (8th season)
- Assistant coaches: Glenn Braica (10th season); Ed Custodio (1st season)
- Home arena: Generoso Pope Athletic Complex

1998–99 Northeast Conference men's basketball standings
	Conf.				Overall
Team	W		L	PCT	W		L	PCT
UMBC	17	–	3	.850	19	–	9	.679
St. Francis Brooklyn	16	–	4	.800	20	–	8	.714
Robert Morris	12	–	8	.600	15	–	12	.556
Central Connecticut	11	–	9	.550	19	–	13	.594
Long Island	10	–	10	.500	10	–	17	.370
Mount St. Mary's†	10	–	10	.500	15	–	15	.500
Fairleigh Dickinson	9	–	11	.450	12	–	16	.429
Wagner	7	–	13	.350	9	–	18	.333
Saint Francis (PA)	7	–	13	.350	9	–	17	.346
Quinnipiac	6	–	14	.300	9	–	18	.333
Monmouth	5	–	15	.250	5	–	21	.192
† 1999 NEC tournament winner

The 1998–99 St. Francis Terriers men's basketball team represented St. Francis College during the 1998–99 NCAA Division I men's basketball season. The team was coached by Ron Ganulin, who was in his eighth year at the helm of the St. Francis Terriers. The Terrier's home games were played at the Generoso Pope Athletic Complex. The team has been a member of the Northeast Conference since 1981.

The Terriers finished the season at 20–8 overall and 16–4 in conference play. Their twenty wins marks the first time in 43 years that the Terriers had accomplished the feat. At the end of the season Ray Minlend was named the NEC Player of the Year, he was the second Terrier to accomplish the feat after Robert Jackson (1984). Minlend also set the Terrier record for points in a season, 690, and points per game, 24.3. During the season Minlend finished 2nd in the NCAA for points per game behind Niagara's Alvin Young (25.1).

== Roster ==
1998–99 St. Francis Brooklyn Terriers men's basketball team
Players
Coaches

Pos.	#	Name	Height	Weight	Year	Hometown
G	25	Ray Minlend	6 ft 2 in (1.88 m)	190 lb (86 kg)	Sr	Yaoundé, Cameroon
F	30	Anthony Rogers	6 ft 7 in (2.01 m)	220 lb (100 kg)	Sr	Carteret, New Jersey
G	32	Tim Rail	6 ft 3 in (1.91 m)	185 lb (84 kg)	Sr	Staten Island, New York
G	14	Solomon Abel	5 ft 11 in (1.8 m)	175 lb (79 kg)	Sr	Bronx, New York
F	24	Angel Santana	6 ft 7 in (2.01 m)	210 lb (95 kg)	Jr	Las Palmas, Spain
F	34	Henry Lalane	6 ft 6 in (1.98 m)	190 lb (86 kg)	Jr	Vista, California
F	42	Gerald Walker	6 ft 7 in (2.01 m)	215 lb (98 kg)	Jr	Pittsburgh, Pennsylvania
F	13	Priit Ilver	6 ft 8 in (2.03 m)	225 lb (102 kg)	Jr	Tallinn, Estonia
F	44	Marcel Dimbeng	6 ft 7 in (2.01 m)	235 lb (107 kg)	Jr	Douala, Cameroon
G	33	Richy Dominguez	6 ft 5 in (1.96 m)	195 lb (88 kg)	So	Chocó, Colombia
C	15	Heberth Reyes	6 ft 11 in (2.11 m)	245 lb (111 kg)	So	San Antonio, Venezuela
G	3	Greg Nunn	5 ft 10 in (1.78 m)	180 lb (82 kg)	So	Inwood, New York
G	10	Tanel Tein	6 ft 4 in (1.93 m)	205 lb (93 kg)	Fr	Tartu, Estonia

Head coach

- Ron Ganulin (LIU Brooklyn '67)

Assistant coach(es)

- Glenn Braica (Queens College '89)
- Ed Custodio (St. Francis College '98)

Legend

- (C) Team captain
- (S) Suspended
- (I) Ineligible
- (W) Walk-on
- Injured
- Current redshirt

== Schedule and results ==
Date time, TV	Opponent	Result	Record	Site city, state
Regular season
November 16, 1998*	at Lehigh	W 88–74	1–0	Stabler Arena; Bethlehem, PA
November 25, 1998*	at Northwestern	L 66–69	1–1	Welsh-Ryan Arena; Evanston, IL
November 30, 1998*	at St. John's	L 63–97	1–2	Carnesecca Arena; Queens, NY
December 5, 1998	Robert Morris	L 86–87	1–3 (0–1)	Generoso Pope Athletic Complex; Brooklyn, NY
December 7, 1998	Wagner	W 85–81	2–3 (1–1)	Generoso Pope Athletic Complex; Brooklyn, NY
December 10, 1998	at Monmouth	W 77–68	3–3 (2–1)	William T. Boylan Gymnasium; West Long Branch, NJ
December 15, 1998*	at Iona	W 82–68	4–3	Hynes Athletic Center; New Rochelle, NY
December 18, 1998*	Caldwell	W 90–76	5–3	Generoso Pope Athletic Complex; Brooklyn, NY
December 27, 1998*	at Notre Dame	L 88–99	5–4	Edmund P. Joyce Center; Notre Dame, IN
January 4, 1999	Mount St. Mary's	W 78–77	6–4 (3–1)	Generoso Pope Athletic Complex; Brooklyn, NY
January 7, 1999	Monmouth	W 79–78	7–4 (4–1)	Generoso Pope Athletic Complex; Brooklyn, NY
January 9, 1999	at Central Connecticut State	W 83–79	8–4 (5–1)	William H. Detrick Gymnasium; New Britain, CT
January 11, 1999	Long Island; Battle of Brooklyn	W 74–68	9–4 (6–1)	Generoso Pope Athletic Complex; Brooklyn, NY
January 13, 1999	Fairleigh Dickinson	W 80–71	10–4 (7–1)	Generoso Pope Athletic Complex; Brooklyn, NY
January 18, 1999	Central Connecticut State	W 86–80	11–4 (8–1)	Generoso Pope Athletic Complex; Brooklyn, NY
January 21, 1999	at Wagner	W 93–77	12–4 (9–1)	Spiro Sports Center; Staten Island, NY
January 23, 1999	Saint Francis (PA)	W 70–55	13–4 (10–1)	Generoso Pope Athletic Complex; Brooklyn, NY
January 28, 1999	at Robert Morris	L 75–76	13–5 (10–2)	Charles L. Sewall Center; Moon Township, PA
January 30, 1999	at Saint Francis (PA)	W 85–84	14–5 (11–2)	DeGol Arena; Loretto, PA
February 4, 1999	Quinnipiac	W 89–75	15–5 (12–2)	Generoso Pope Athletic Complex; Brooklyn, NY
February 6, 1999	Fairleigh Dickinson	L 73–77	15–6 (12–3)	Generoso Pope Athletic Complex; Brooklyn, NY
February 11, 1999	at Quinnipiac	W 95–74	16–6 (13–3)	Burt Kahn Court; Hamden, CT
February 14, 1999	at Long Island	W 94–81	17–6 (14–3)	Schwartz Athletic Center; Brooklyn, NY
February 16, 1999	UMBC	W 87–77	18–6 (15–3)	Generoso Pope Athletic Complex; Brooklyn, NY
February 18, 1999	at Mount St. Mary's	W 83–70	19–6 (16–3)	Knott Arena; Emmitsburg, MD
February 20, 1999	at UMBC	L 66–81	19–7 (16–4)	Retriever Activities Center; Baltimore, MD
1999 NEC tournament
February 27, 1999	vs. Fairleigh Dickinson; Quarterfinals	W 65–58	20–7	Spiro Sports Center; Staten Island, NY
February 28, 1999	vs. Mount St. Mary's; Semifinals	L 66–68	20–8	Spiro Sports Center; Staten Island, NY
*Non-conference game. ^{#}Rankings from AP Poll. (#) Tournament seedings in parentheses.
