= Julian Norfleet =

American basketball player (born 1991)

No. 23 – APOEL
- Position: Point guard / shooting guard
- League: Cyprus Basketball Division A

Personal information
- Born: November 2, 1991 (age 35) Virginia Beach, Virginia
- Listed height: 6 ft 2 in (1.88 m)
- Listed weight: 165 lb (75 kg)

Career information
- High school: Landstown (Virginia Beach, Virginia)
- College: Mount St. Mary's (2010–2014)
- NBA draft: 2014: undrafted
- Playing career: 2014–present

Career history
- 2014–2015: Rilski Sportist
- 2015-2016: Boncourt
- 2016–2017: ZTE
- 2017–2018: Falco Szombathely
- 2019: Atomerőmű SE
- 2019–2020: Kaposvári
- 2020–present: APOEL

Career highlights
- Second-team All-NEC (2014)

Julian Norfleet (born November 2, 1991) is an American professional basketball player for APOEL of the Cypriot League. He played college basketball for the Mount St. Mary's University.

== High school career ==
Norfleet played for Landstown High School, at Virginia Beach, Virginia.

== College career ==
Norfleet played for Mount St. Mary's Mountaineers from 2010 until 2014.

== Professional career ==
After going undrafted in the 2014 NBA draft, Norfleet signed with BC Rilski Sportist of the NBL for the 2014–15 season. On September 20, 2016, he joined ZTE of the Hungarian League. The following season, he stayed in Hungary and joined Falco Szombathely.

On October 1, 2020, he joined APOEL of the Cypriot League.
