= Jim Phelan (basketball) =

American basketball player and coach (1929–2021)

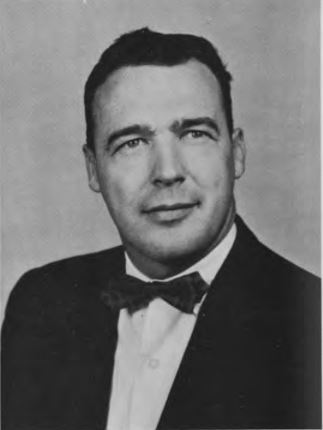
- Phelan c. 1962

Personal information
- Born: March 19, 1929 Philadelphia, Pennsylvania, U.S.
- Died: June 15, 2021 (aged 92) Emmitsburg, Maryland, U.S.
- Listed height: 6 ft 1 in (1.85 m)
- Listed weight: 175 lb (79 kg)

Career information
- High school: La Salle HS (Wyndmoor, Pennsylvania)
- College: La Salle (1948–1951)
- NBA draft: 1951: 8th round, 77th overall pick
- Drafted by: Philadelphia Warriors
- Playing career: 1953–1954
- Position: Guard
- Number: 16
- Coaching career: 1953–2003

Career history

Playing
- 1953: Philadelphia Warriors
- 1954: Pottstown Packers

Coaching
- 1953–1954: La Salle (assistant)
- 1954–2003: Mount St. Mary's

Career highlights
- NCAA College Division champion (1962)
- Stats at NBA.com
- Stats at Basketball Reference

Career coaching record
- College: 830–524 (.613)
- Collegiate Basketball Hall of Fame

James Joseph Phelan (March 19, 1929 – June 15, 2021) was an American college basketball coach. He is best known for his 49-year coaching career at Mount Saint Mary's University. Phelan was a 1951 graduate of La Salle University and played one season for the Philadelphia Warriors of the NBA. He was famous for wearing a bow tie on the sidelines.

== Early life ==
Born in Philadelphia, Phelan graduated from La Salle College High School in 1947 and La Salle University in 1951. From 1951 to 1953, during the Korean War, Phelan served in the United States Marine Corps.

== Professional playing career ==
Selected in the eighth round (77th overall) in the 1951 NBA draft, Phelan played in four games as a reserve for the Philadelphia Warriors in 1953. He then played for the Pottstown Packers in the Eastern League.

== Coaching career ==
Phelan coached his entire career at Mount St. Mary's University. He led the Mountaineers to the 1962 NCAA Men's Division II Basketball Championship as well as 14 NCAA Division II tournaments and five Final Four appearances. When he retired in 2003, after coaching for 49 years, he had amassed 830 wins (overall record of 830–524) in over 1,300 games in all divisions. In those 49 years, Phelan had 19 teams that reached 20 or more wins in a season. Prior to the announcement of his induction to the National Collegiate Basketball Hall of Fame in April 2008, Phelan was often noted for having the most victories of any coach not in the Hall of Fame.

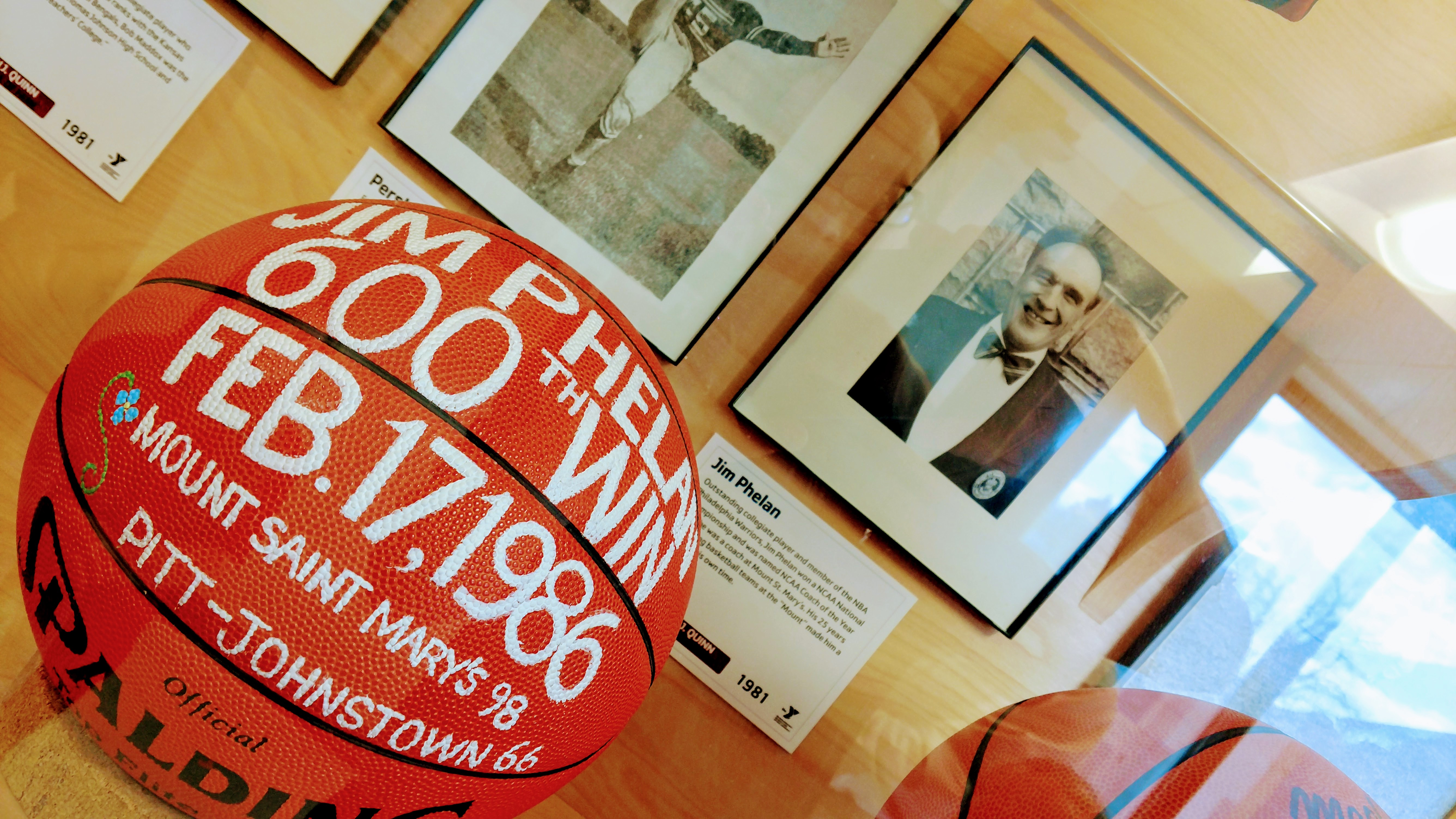
Jim Phelan's 600th win ball from Feb 17, 1986

On February 17, 1986, Phelan earned his 600th win as Mount St. Mary's head coach.

Phelan got his 800th win in the Northeast Conference Championship Game on March 1, 1999. He became just the fourth coach in NCAA history to get 800 career wins; currently he sits 14th on the all-time list. On January 19, 1998, he became just the second coach in NCAA history to coach in 1,200 career games. The only other coach to do so prior was Clarence Gaines. Phelan held the record in games coached with 1,354 across all NCAA divisions and is currently fourth on the all-time list; he is behind Phog Allen and tied with Jim Smith for second place in total career seasons coached with 49, though all 49 of Phelan's and Smith's seasons came at one school while Allen coached at four other institutions besides Kansas, where he gained fame.

=== Coaching highlights ===
- 830 wins (14th most all time)
- 1,354 games coached (4th most all time)
- 5 Final Fours
- 16 NCAA Division II Tournament Appearances
- 2 NCAA Division I Tournament Appearances
- 2 championship games coached
- 1962 NCAA Division II champions
- 1962 National Coach of the Year

=== Players coached ===
Notable players that Phelan coached include Fred "Mad Dog" Carter, Jack Sullivan, and Jon O'Reilly. The 1962 team won the school's only national championship. Phelan earned his first of two coach of the year awards in '62. In the book, King of the Mount: The Jim Phelan Story, the 1980–81 season is a highlight.

=== Acknowledgments ===
Collegeinsider.com, in 2003, renamed its coach of year award the "Jim Phelan National Coach of the Year Award".

Mount Saint Mary's University has also renamed its court "Jim Phelan Court", complete with his years coached and his signature bow tie painted on each end of the court. A new banner was also revealed in the ARCC Arena (MSMU's home court) with a Phelan bow tie and signifying his 830 wins.

The Northeast Conference Coach of the Year award is named after Jim Phelan.

In November 2008, Phelan was inducted into the National Collegiate Basketball Hall of Fame in Kansas City, MO. Other members of his induction class included Nolan Richardson (former coach at the University of Arkansas), Charles Barkley (former Auburn player and NBA veteran), and commentators Billy Packer and Dick Vitale. Phelan said of his induction, "It is an honor to be selected for induction. It's a great feeling to be in such a distinguished group of gentlemen."

== Personal life ==
Phelan and his wife Dottie had five children (Jim, Lynne, Carol, Larry, and Bobby) and ten grandchildren.

Phelan died on June 15, 2021, at the age of 92 at his home in Emmitsburg.

== Career playing statistics ==
Legend
GP	Games played	GS	Games started	MPG	Minutes per game
FG%	Field goal percentage	3P%	3-point field goal percentage	FT%	Free throw percentage
RPG	Rebounds per game	APG	Assists per game	SPG	Steals per game
BPG	Blocks per game	PPG	Points per game	**Bold**	Career high

=== NBA ===
==== Regular season ====
Year	Team	GP	MPG	FG%	FT%	RPG	APG	PPG
1953–54	Philadelphia	4	8.3	.000	.500	1.3	.5	.8

== Head coaching record ==
Record table
Season	Team	Overall	Conference	Standing	Postseason
**Mount St. Mary's Mountaineers** (Mason–Dixon Conference) (1954–1978)
1954–55	Mount St. Mary's	22–3	14–1		
1955–56	Mount St. Mary's	20–8	12–2		
1956–57	Mount St. Mary's	27–5	12–1		NCAA College Third Place
1957–58	Mount St. Mary's	16–9	9–3		
1958–59	Mount St. Mary's	15–12	8–4		
1959–60	Mount St. Mary's	19–6	14–2		
1960–61	Mount St. Mary's	26–5	15–0		NCAA College Fourth Place
1961–62	Mount St. Mary's	24–6	12–2		NCAA College champion
1962–63	Mount St. Mary's	13–12	8–6		NCAA College Regional Fourth Place
1963–64	Mount St. Mary's	18–7	12–3		
1964–65	Mount St. Mary's	20–5	15–2		
1965–66	Mount St. Mary's	21–6	15–2		
1966–67	Mount St. Mary's	18–9	12–4		
1967–68	Mount St. Mary's	21–6	15–2		
1968–69	Mount St. Mary's	20–8	12–1	1st	NCAA College Regional Final
1969–70	Mount St. Mary's	20–6	9–3		NCAA College Regional Fourth Place
1970–71	Mount St. Mary's	10–14	6–6		
1971–72	Mount St. Mary's	6–17	5–6		
1972–73	Mount St. Mary's	15–10	10–4		
1973–74	Mount St. Mary's	17–10	8–5		
1974–75	Mount St. Mary's	14–11	7–6		
1975–76	Mount St. Mary's	16–12	10–6		
1976–77	Mount St. Mary's	9–18	5–7		
1977–78	Mount St. Mary's	16–11	7–3		
**Mount St. Mary's Mountaineers** (NCAA Division II independent) (1978–1983)
1978–79	Mount St. Mary's	18–10			NCAA D-II First Round
1979–80	Mount St. Mary's	22–7			NCAA D-II First Round
1980–81	Mount St. Mary's	28–3			NCAA Division II Runner-Up
1981–82	Mount St. Mary's	20–8			NCAA Division II First Round
1982–83	Mount St. Mary's	18–9			
**Mount St. Mary's Mountaineers** (Mason–Dixon Conference) (1983–1988)
1983–84	Mount St. Mary's	21–9	5–5		
1984–85	Mount St. Mary's	28–5	9–3		NCAA D-II Final Four
1985–86	Mount St. Mary's	26–4	11–1		NCAA D-II First Round
1986–87	Mount St. Mary's	26–5	8–2		NCAA Division II First Round
1987–88	Mount St. Mary's	20–8	8–2		
**Mount St. Mary's Mountaineers** (NCAA Division I independent) (1988–1989)
1988–89	Mount St. Mary's	12–15			
**Mount St. Mary's Mountaineers** (Northeast Conference) (1989–2003)
1989–90	Mount St. Mary's	16–12	10–6	T–3rd	
1990–91	Mount St. Mary's	8–19	6–10	6th	
1991–92	Mount St. Mary's	6–22	3–13	9th	
1992–93	Mount St. Mary's	13–15	10–8	T–3rd	
1993–94	Mount St. Mary's	14–14	9–9	T–7th	
1994–95	Mount St. Mary's	17–13	12–6	T–2nd	NCAA Round of 64
1995–96	Mount St. Mary's	21–8	16–2	1st	NIT First Round
1996–97	Mount St. Mary's	14–13	10–8	T–4th	
1997–98	Mount St. Mary's	13–15	8–8	5th	
1998–99	Mount St. Mary's	15–15	10–10	T–5th	NCAA Round of 64
1999–2000	Mount St. Mary's	9–20	7–11	T–7th	
2000–01	Mount St. Mary's	7–21	7–13	T–9th	
2001–02	Mount St. Mary's	3–24	2–18	12th	
2002–03	Mount St. Mary's	11–16	6–12	T–10th	
Total:		830–524 (.613)			
National champion Postseason invitational champion Conference regular season champion Conference regular season and conference tournament champion Division regular season champion Division regular season and conference tournament champion Conference tournament champion

== See also ==
- List of college men's basketball coaches with 600 wins
