= Mel Peterson =

American basketball player (born 1938)

Personal information
- Born: March 23, 1938 (age 88) Thief River Falls, Minnesota, U.S.
- Listed height: 6 ft 4 in (1.93 m)
- Listed weight: 185 lb (84 kg)

Career information
- High school: Stephenson (Stephenson, Michigan)
- College: Wheaton (1956–1960)
- NBA draft: 1960: 11th round, 78th overall pick
- Drafted by: Detroit Pistons
- Playing career: 1963–1970
- Position: Shooting guard / small forward
- Number: 16, 40, 44

Career history
- 1963–1964: Baltimore Bullets
- 1967–1969: Oakland Oaks
- 1969–1970: Los Angeles Stars

Career highlights
- ABA champion (1969); NCAA College Division champion (1957); NCAA College Division Tournament MVP (1957)

Career statistics
- Points: 1,032 (7.7 ppg)
- Rebounds: 635 (4.7 rpg)
- Assists: 160 (1.2 apg)
- Stats at NBA.com
- Stats at Basketball Reference
Medals
Representing United States
Men's basketball
Pan American Games
Gold medal – first place	1963 São Paulo	Team Competition

Melvin Lowell Peterson (born March 23, 1938) is an American former National Basketball Association (NBA) and American Basketball Association (ABA) player.

== Collegiate career ==
Mel attended Wheaton College. While at Wheaton College, Mel was selected as a three-time All-American basketball player. He was also selected as the Most Outstanding Player of the 1957 NCAA Men's Division II basketball tournament, as Wheaton College won the inaugural NCAA Division II tournament. Mel finished his career at Wheaton College, averaging 22.7 points and 15.8 rebounds per game. He still ranks as Wheaton College's all-time leader in points per game, career points, field goals made, and career rebounds.

== Professional career ==
Mel was drafted with the fourth pick in the 11th round of the 1960 NBA draft by the Detroit Pistons. On August 15, 1963, Mel signed as a free agent with the Baltimore Bullets. In two games with the Bullets, Mel recorded a total of two points and one rebound. Peterson did not play for the following three seasons. Mel made his ABA debut on October 13, 1967, for the Oakland Oaks.

== Career statistics ==
Legend
GP	Games played	GS	Games started	MPG	Minutes per game
FG%	Field goal percentage	3P%	3-point field goal percentage	FT%	Free throw percentage
RPG	Rebounds per game	APG	Assists per game	SPG	Steals per game
BPG	Blocks per game	PPG	Points per game	**Bold**	Career high

†	Denotes seasons in which Peterson's team won an ABA championship

=== NBA/ABA ===
==== Regular season ====
Year	Team	GP	MPG	FG%	3P%	FT%	RPG	APG	PPG
1963–64	Baltimore	2	1.5	**1.000**		–	.5	.0	1.0
1967–68	Oakland (ABA)	**77**	**20.6**	.427	**.265**	.817	**5.9**	**1.4**	**9.5**
1968–69†	Oakland (ABA)	51	13.9	.502	.000	.800	3.3	1.1	5.4
1969–70	L.A. Stars (ABA)	4	13.3	.286	.000	**1.000**	3.3	.3	5.8
Career (ABA)		132	17.8	.441	.225	.820	4.8	1.2	7.8
Career (overall)		134	17.6	.442	.225	.820	4.7	1.2	7.7

==== Playoffs ====
Year	Team	GP	MPG	FG%	3P%	FT%	RPG	APG	PPG
1969†	Oakland (ABA)	**14**	**7.0**	**.600**	**.500**	**.583**	**2.0**	.3	**3.1**
1970	L.A. Stars (ABA)	4	5.5	.500	–	.500	1.5	**.5**	1.8
Career		18	6.7	.583	.500	.571	1.9	.3	2.8
