= 1998–99 Mount St. Mary's Mountaineers men's basketball team =

American college basketball season

1998–99 Mount St. Mary's Mountaineers men's basketball
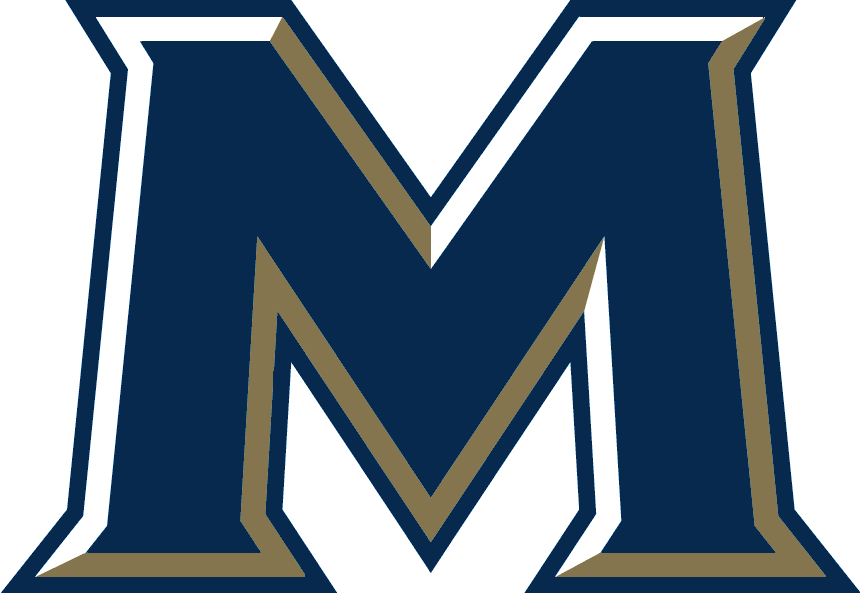

NEC tournament champions

NCAA tournament, first round
- Conference: Northeast Conference
- Record: 15–15 (10–10 NEC)
- Head coach: Jim Phelan (45th season)
- Home arena: Knott Arena

1998–99 Northeast Conference men's basketball standings
	Conf.				Overall
Team	W		L	PCT	W		L	PCT
UMBC	17	–	3	.850	19	–	9	.679
St. Francis Brooklyn	16	–	4	.800	20	–	8	.714
Robert Morris	12	–	8	.600	15	–	12	.556
Central Connecticut	11	–	9	.550	19	–	13	.594
Long Island	10	–	10	.500	10	–	17	.370
Mount St. Mary's†	10	–	10	.500	15	–	15	.500
Fairleigh Dickinson	9	–	11	.450	12	–	16	.429
Wagner	7	–	13	.350	9	–	18	.333
Saint Francis (PA)	7	–	13	.350	9	–	17	.346
Quinnipiac	6	–	14	.300	9	–	18	.333
Monmouth	5	–	15	.250	5	–	21	.192
† 1999 NEC tournament winner

The 1998–99 Mount St. Mary's Mountaineers men's basketball team represented Mount St. Mary's University during the 1998–99 NCAA Division I men's basketball season. The Mountaineers, led by head coach Jim Phelan, played their home games at Knott Arena and were members of the Northeast Conference. They finished the season 15–15, 10–10 in NEC play to finish in sixth place. They were champions of the NEC tournament to earn an automatic bid to the NCAA tournament. Playing as the No. 16 seed in the Midwest region, the Mountaineers lost to No. 1 seed and eventual Final Four participant Michigan State in the Round of 64.

== Roster ==
1998–99 Mount St. Mary's Mountaineers men's basketball team
Players	Coaches
Pos. / # / Name / Height / Weight / Year / Hometown; G / / Gregory Harris / 6 ft 3 in (1.91 m) / — / Jr	Head coach: Jim Phelan; Assistant coach(es) Legend: (C) Team captain; (S) Suspended; (I) Ineligible; (W) Walk-on; Injured; Current redshirt

== Schedule and results ==
Date time, TV	Rank^{#}	Opponent^{#}	Result	Record	Site (attendance) city, state
Non-conference Regular season
Nov 14, 1998*		La Salle	W 92–88 ^{OT}	1–0	Knott Arena
Nov 22, 1998*		at Santa Clara	L 53–82	1–1	Toso Pavilion; Santa Clara, California
Nov 27, 1998*		at Villanova	L 68–71	1–2	First Union Center; Philadelphia, Pennsylvania
Dec 3, 1998		at UMBC	L 59–68	1–3 (0–1)	RAC Arena; Catonsville, Maryland
NEC Regular season
Northeast Conference tournament
Feb 27, 1999*		vs. Robert Morris; Quarterfinals	W 80–63	13–14	Spiro Sports Center; Staten Island, New York
Feb 28, 1999*		vs. St. Francis (NY); Semifinals	W 68–66	14–14	Spiro Sports Center; Staten Island, New York
Mar 1, 1999*		vs. Central Connecticut State; Championship game	W 72–56	15–14	Spiro Sports Center; Staten Island, New York
NCAA tournament
Mar 12, 1999*; CBS	(16 MW)	vs. (1 MW) No. 2 Michigan State; First round	L 53–76	15–15	Bradley Center; Milwaukee, Wisconsin
*Non-conference game. ^{#}Rankings from AP Poll, (#) during NCAA Tournament is seed within region MW=Midwest. (#) Tournament seedings in parentheses. All times are in Eastern Time.
