= Lee Pfund =

American baseball player and coach, basketball coach (1919–2016)

- Pitcher
- Born: October 10, 1919; Oak Park, Illinois, U.S.
- Died: June 2, 2016 (aged 96); Carol Stream, Illinois, U.S.
- Batted: Right Threw: Right

MLB debut
- April 21, 1945, for the Brooklyn Dodgers

Last MLB appearance
- July 5, 1945, for the Brooklyn Dodgers

MLB statistics
- Win–loss record: 3–2
- Earned run average: 5.20
- Strikeouts: 27
- Stats at Baseball Reference

Teams
- Brooklyn Dodgers (1945)

LeRoy Herbert Pfund (October 10, 1919 – June 2, 2016) was an American Major League Baseball pitcher and college baseball and college basketball coach.

== Early life ==
Pfund was born in Oak Park, Illinois.

== Baseball career ==
On November 1, 1944, Pfund was drafted by the Brooklyn Dodgers from the St. Louis Cardinals in the 1944 rule 5 draft, and played for the Dodgers in 1945. The 25-year-old rookie right-hander stood 6 ft 1 in (1.85 m) and weighed 185 lb (84 kg). Pfund was one of many ballplayers who only appeared in the major leagues during World War II. He made his major league debut in relief against the New York Giants at the Polo Grounds on April 21, 1945, when professional baseball teams conducted spring training in the north. His first major league win came in his first start, on May 14, 1945, as the Dodgers defeated the Pittsburgh Pirates 4–1 at Ebbets Field.

Season and career totals for 15 games include a 3–2 record, 10 games started, 2 complete games, 2 games finished, and an ERA of 5.20 in 62.1 innings pitched. Pfund went 4-for-22 (.182) in batting with a double and 2 walks, had 4 runs batted in and scored 2 runs. Even though he pitched 62.1 innings in 1945, Pfund tied for ninth among National League hurlers with 5 hit batsmen. By contrast, it took the other five pitchers who were tied with him for ninth an average of 191.2 innings to hit the same number of batters. A knee injury curtailed hopes of returning to the majors.

== College career ==
Lee Pfund
Coaching career (HC unless noted)

Basketball
- 1951–1975: Wheaton (IL)

Baseball
- 1948–1959: Wheaton (IL)
- 1961–1975: Wheaton (IL)

Head coaching record
- Overall: 361–240 (basketball); 254–306–4 (baseball)

Accomplishments and honors

Championships
- Basketball; NCAA College Division (1957)

In 1948, Pfund was hired to coach the baseball team while still at the college studying for his bachelor's degree. He was hired to also coach the basketball program in 1951. He was employed at Wheaton College in Wheaton, Illinois for nearly 39 years, as a professor of physical education, baseball coach, basketball coach, and executive director of the Alumni Association (1975–87). He led the basketball team to a championship with the 1957 NCAA College Division basketball tournament, the first basketball tournament for the NCAA College Division (now referred to as NCAA Division II).

Pfund was the winningest coach in Wheaton history for both men's basketball (362) and baseball (249) In 1977, he received the Distinguished Service to Alma Mater award from the Wheaton Alumni Association. In 1985, he was inducted into the Wheaton Athletics Department's Hall of Honor. In the opening weeks of each season every year since 1996, the Wheaton men's basketball program has hosted the Lee Pfund Classic basketball tournament. In 2000, Lee Pfund Gymnasium opened as a practice and recreation space in the Sports and Recreation Complex on the Wheaton campus. In April 2012, Lee Pfund Stadium – outfitted with lights, new dugouts, a new backstop, and artificial turf – opened in Carol Stream, Illinois, where it is the home of the Wheaton baseball program. On April 30, 2016, Pfund's jersey number 17 — the number he wore as skipper of the baseball team at Wheaton — was retired.

Pfund was inducted into the Illinois State Basketball Coaches Association “Hall of Fame”. He died on June 2, 2016, at the age of 96. Pfund's son, Randy, was the head coach of the Los Angeles Lakers and later general manager of the Miami Heat.
