= Theodoros Rodopoulos =

Greek basketball coach

Personal information
- Born: June 4, 1944 (age 82)

Career information
- Playing career: 1956–1968
- Coaching career: 1969–1992

Career history

Playing
- 1961–1968: Aris Thessaloniki

Coaching
- 1969–1975: HANTH
- 1980–1983: PAOK
- 1985–1986: PAOK
- 1992: Iraklis Thessaloniki

Theodoros Rodopoulos (Greek: Θεόδωρος Ροδόπουλος; born June 4, 1944, Thessaloniki, Greece) is a Greek professional basketball coach and a retired professional player. He is considered the guru of Greek basketball having attended numerous NBA summer camps and coaching seminars in the United States, a country that has visited 160 times. As a coach he has been influenced by Bobby Knight and Jim Smith.

== Club career ==
Rodopoulos started his career from XANTH, then Aris Thessaloniki and soon was called up to the national team. After an argument with the club officials for his limited playing time he asked for a transfer with Olympiacos Piraeus offering 300 thousand drachmas (the national transfer record was 85.000 at the time). Aris declined the offer and Rodopoulos decided to retire in 1968 at just 24 to pursue a coaching career. As a player he featured for youth, senior and military national teams of Greece.

== Coaching career ==
He first coached youth players of HANTH B.C. (a.k.a. YMCA of Thessaloniki) and soon took over Olympos 40 Ekklision (Soulis Markopoulos was a player there) before returning to HANTH as first coach in 1969. In 1970 he moved to the US with scholarship from YMCA to study basketball coaching at Springfield College. After a season he moved back to Greece coaching HANTH again until 1975. Rodopoulos built a competitive team claiming the 1972 national title only to lose out on the final match day. HANTH was on top of the Greek Basket League with just 2 games left, when the Federation suspended the league for 2 months.

He coached youth national teams of Greece in the 1970s having as players Nikos Stavropoulos and Panagiotis Giannakis. In 1980 he took over PAOK where he stayed for 3 years and returned again in 1985 for one season. During his first seasons with PAOK his team lost to crosstown rivals Aris only once.

In 1992-93 he became Iraklis coach bringing NBAer Steve Burtt instead of the team's superstar David Ancrum developing a feud with the club's fans. After Iraklis he quit coaching with the increasing involvement of agents in basketball being the main reason.

In 1983 he founded the Salonica Basketball Camp and a few years later the Asteria Academy which produced many international players such as Dinos Mitoglou.

He has worked as scouter for various NBA clubs, credited for the transfer of Andrei Kirilenko to Utah Jazz. Rodopoulos also has watched 25 NBA All-Star Game and 36 NCAA Final Fours. He is a member of the National Association of Basketball Coaches since 1970.
