= Chris McGuthrie =

American basketball player

Personal information
- Born: June 9, 1974 (age 52) Washington, D.C., U.S.
- Listed height: 5 ft 9 in (1.75 m)
- Listed weight: 167 lb (76 kg)

Career information
- High school: Springbrook (Silver Spring, Maryland)
- College: Mount St. Mary's (1992–1996)
- NBA draft: 1996: undrafted
- Playing career: 1997–2006
- Position: Point guard

Career history

Playing
- 1997: Maccabi Rishon LeZion
- 1998: Rotterdam
- 1998–2003: Amsterdam Astronauts
- 2003–2004: Valladolid
- 2004: Šibenka
- 2004–2006: MPC Capitals

Coaching
- 2015–present: Watkins Mill HS

Career highlights
- DBL Most Valuable Player (2001); 4× DBL champion (1999–2002); 2× NBB-Beker champion (1999, 2005); DBL All-Star Game MVP (1998); NEC Player of the Year (1996)

Christopher Marcus McGuthrie (born June 9, 1974) is an American former professional basketball player. He played as a point guard.

McGuthrie played college basketball at Mount St. Mary's University. He was named Northeast Conference Player of the Year in 1996.

While playing for Ricoh Astronauts Amsterdam, he was named MVP of the Dutch Basketball League in the 2000–01 season.
