= 1957 NCAA College Division basketball tournament =

Edition of USA college basketball tournament

- Teams: 32
- Finals site: Roberts Municipal Stadium, Evansville, Indiana
- Champions: Wheaton Crusaders (1st title)
- Runner-up: Kentucky Wesleyan Panthers (1st title game)
- Semifinalists: Mount St. Mary's Mountaineers (1st Final Four); Los Angeles State Golden Eagles (1st Final Four)
- Winning coach: Lee Pfund (1st title)
- MOP: Mel Peterson (Wheaton)
- Attendance: 13,000

The 1957 NCAA College Division basketball tournament involved 32 schools playing in a single-elimination tournament to determine the national champion of men's NCAA College Division college basketball as a culmination of the 1956–57 NCAA College Division men's basketball season. This was the first College Division men's basketball tournament and it was won by Wheaton College. Wheaton's Mel Peterson was named the Most Outstanding Player.

Jackson State, citing policy of the Mississippi Board of Trustees, was compelled to withdraw from the tournament rather than competing in an interracial contest. This would be the only time such an occurrence would directly mar the tournament, and Jackson State themselves would return to the tournament in 1964.

1957 NCAA Division II Men's sites - first round games
1957 NCAA Division II Men's sites - regional final (cyan) Elite Eight (red)

== Regionals ==
=== East ===
Semifinal at North Carolina College; Round of 32; March 4
North Carolina Central	78
Florida A&M	61

Semifinal at Mount Saint Mary's; Round of 32; March 4
Mount St. Mary's	93
CCNY	84

Final at Mount Saint Mary's; Sweet 16; March 9
Mount St. Mary's	106
North Carolina Central	88

=== Northeast ===
Semifinal at Drexel; Round of 32; March 4
Rider	63
Drexel	61

Semifinal at Amherst; Round of 32; March 4
St. Michael's	80
Amherst	63

Final at Saint Michael's; Sweet 16; March 9
St. Michael's	68
Rider	69

=== South ===
Semifinal at East Tennessee State; Round of 32; March 4
East Tennessee State	62*
Centenary (LA)	61

Semifinal at Kentucky Wesleyan; Round of 32; March 4
Kentucky Wesleyan	77
DePauw	62

Final at Kentucky Wesleyan; Sweet 16; March 9
Kentucky Wesleyan	84
East Tennessee State	73

=== Mideast ===
Semifinal at Evansville; Round of 32; March 4
Evansville	108
Illinois State	96

Semifinal at Buffalo; Round of 32; March 4
Buffalo	75
Capital	64

Final at Buffalo; Sweet 16; March 9
Buffalo	77
Evansville	75

Cortland State was extended and accepted an at-large bid. They withdrew two days later, in order to participate in the annual State University of New York Teachers College Basketball Tournament instead to avoid creating ill feelings with host Oswego State. Buffalo was chosen to replace Cortland State in the NCAA tournament field.

=== Great Lakes ===
Semifinal at Beloit; Round of 32; March 4
Beloit	103
Wisconsin–Superior	79

Semifinal at Minnesota-Duluth; Round of 32; March 4
Wheaton (IL)	84
Minnesota–Duluth	75

Final at Wheaton (IL); Sweet 16; March 9
Wheaton	77
Beloit	75

=== Midwest ===
Semifinal at Jackson State; Round of 32; March 4
Jackson State	93
Philander Smith	65

Semifinal at Monmouth (IL); Round of 32; March 4
South Dakota	62
Monmouth (IL)	52

Final at South Dakota; Sweet 16; March 9
South Dakota	2
Jackson State	0†

=== West ===
Semifinal at Pacific (OR); Round of 32; March 4
Linfield	83*
Pacific (OR)	79

Semifinal at Nevada; Round of 32; March 4
Cal State Los Angeles	75
Nevada	69

Final at Cal State-Los Angeles; Sweet 16; March 9
Cal State Los Angeles	85
Linfield	74

=== Pacific Coast ===
Semifinal at San Diego State; Round of 32; March 4
San Diego State	75
Chapman	56

Semifinal at Regis (CO); Round of 32; March 4
Regis (CO)	88
Wartburg	82

Final at Regis (CO); Sweet 16; March 9
Regis	78
San Diego State	81

*denotes each overtime played
† denotes forfeited game

== National Finals - Evansville, Indiana ==
Location: Roberts Municipal Stadium Host: Evansville College

National Quarterfinals; Elite Eight; March 13
Rider	66
Mount St. Mary's	86
Buffalo	68
Kentucky Wesleyan	72
South Dakota	80
Wheaton	90
San Diego State	55
Cal State Los Angeles	57

National Semifinals; Final Four; March 14
Mount St. Mary's	81
Kentucky Wesleyan	99
Wheaton	71
Cal State Los Angeles	53

National Championship; March 15
Kentucky Wesleyan	65
Wheaton	89

- Third Place - Mount St. Mary's 82, Cal State Los Angeles 72

*denotes each overtime played
† denotes forfeited game

== All-tournament team ==
- Mason Cope (Kentucky Wesleyan)
- Jim Daniels (South Dakota)
- Mel Peterson (Wheaton)
- Jack Sullivan (Mount Saint Mary's)
- Bob Whitehead (Wheaton)

== See also ==
- 1957 NCAA University Division basketball tournament
- 1957 National Invitation Tournament
- 1957 NAIA basketball tournament

== Sources ==
- 2010 NCAA Men's Basketball Championship Tournament Records and Statistics: Division II men's basketball Championship
- 1957 NCAA College Division Men's Basketball Tournament jonfmorse.com
