= Jack Sullivan (basketball) =

American basketball coach and labor activist (1935–2010)

Personal information
- Born: July 27, 1935 Washington, D.C.
- Died: September 16, 2010 (aged 75) Baltimore, Maryland
- Listed height: 6 ft 4 in (1.93 m)

Career information
- High school: St. Anthony's (Washington, D.C.)
- College: Mount St. Mary's (1953–1957)
- NBA draft: 1957: 2nd round, 14th overall pick
- Drafted by: Philadelphia Warriors

Career highlights
- No. 32 retired by Mount St. Mary's University
- Stats at Basketball Reference

John Francis Sullivan (July 27, 1935 – September 16, 2010) was an American basketball coach and labor activist.

== College career ==
Sullivan played on the Mount St. Mary's Mountaineers men's basketball team from 1953 to 1957. His average of 25.4 points per game is still the school record. His 2,676 points is still the school record for a career. His 1,070 points in the 1957 season is still the school record for one season. With a 27–5 record in 1957, the Mountaineers earned a berth in the NCAA College Division Final Four.

== Basketball playing career ==
In 1957, he was drafted as the 14th overall pick by the Philadelphia Warriors, but instead played for the Washington Tapers of the newly formed American Basketball League in 1961.

== Coaching career ==
Sullivan coached boys' varsity basketball at Gonzaga College High School, then girls' varsity basketball at Academy of the Holy Names (Silver Spring, Maryland) from 1979 to 1987, and finally the women's basketball team at The Catholic University of America from 1989 to 1996.

== Career outside basketball ==
After retiring from basketball in the early 1960s, Sullivan joined the Boston field office of the United States Secret Service as a special agent. According to his family, Sullivan was stationed at the Kennedy Compound when President John F. Kennedy was assassinated.

Sullivan also worked for labor unions, beginning in 1981 as director of government relations for the International Brotherhood of Teamsters. He later became a lobbyist for the Center to Protect Workers' Rights, part of Building and Construction Trades Department, AFL–CIO, until retiring in 1996.

== Personal life and death ==
He was married to Patricia Dailey for 49 years; she survived him. They had six children.

On September 16, 2010, he died of septic shock at the University of Maryland Medical Center in Baltimore, Maryland.

== Head coaching record ==
Record table
Season	Team	Overall	Conference	Standing	Postseason
Catholic University Cardinals (NCAA Division III independent) (1989–1990)
1989–90	Catholic University	5–18			
Catholic University Cardinals (Capital Athletic Conference) (1990–1996)
1990–91	Catholic University	9–16	7–3	T–2nd	
1991–92	Catholic University	9–14	4–4	T–4th	
1993–94	Catholic University	7–17	3–9	6th	
1994–95	Catholic University	10–13	5–9	T–5th	
1995–96	Catholic University	7–17	2–12	7th	
Catholic University:		57–112	21–37		
Total:		57–112			
