= Jim Smith (basketball coach) =

American basketball coach

Jim Smith (born June 5, 1934) is a college basketball head coach. As the head coach of Saint John's University in Minnesota, he has achieved 770 wins, making him the winningest head coach in Minnesota college basketball history and is second among all Division III coaches in wins. Smith recorded his 700th win on November 21, 2009, against Division II school Minnesota-State Moorhead.

== Coaching career ==
Throughout his 49-year career, Smith has led his Basketball teams to seven MIAC titles, five MIAC playoff titles, nine trips to the NAIA tournament, and eight trips to the NCAA Division III playoffs.
