= Rider Broncs men's basketball =

Rider Broncs
2026–27 Rider Broncs men's basketball team
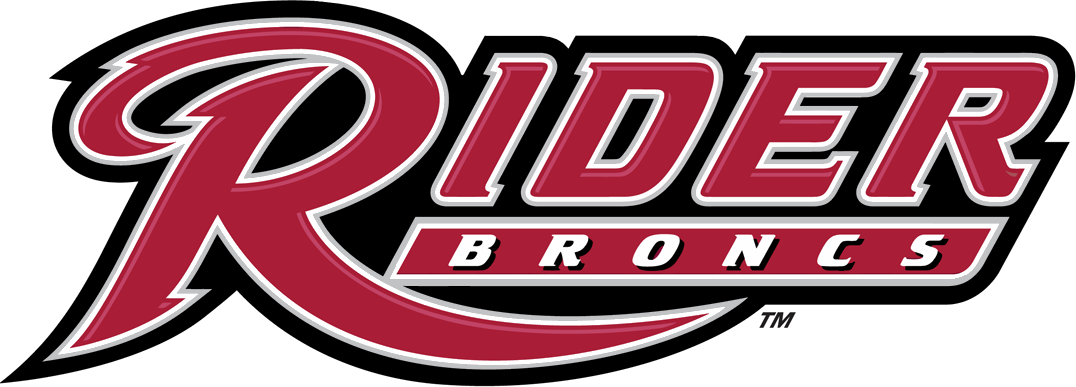
- University: Rider University
- Head coach: Kevin Baggett (15th season)
- Location: Lawrence Township, New Jersey
- Arena: Canastra Hammer Arena (capacity: 1,650)
- Conference: MAAC
- Nickname: Broncs
- Colors: Cranberry, white, and gray

NCAA Division I tournament Elite Eight
- 1957*
Other NCAA Division I tournament results
Sweet Sixteen	1957*
Appearances	1957*, 1984, 1993, 1994

Conference tournament champions
- NEC: 1993, 1994; ECC: 1984

Conference regular-season champions
- 2002, 2005, 2008, 2018; NEC: 1993, 1994, 1995; ECC: 1970, 1972, 1974, 1981, 1983

Uniforms
Home	Away
- * at Division II level

The Rider Broncs men's basketball team is the NCAA Division I intercollegiate men's basketball program that represents Rider University in Lawrenceville, New Jersey, United States. The school's team currently competes in the Metro Atlantic Athletic Conference (MAAC), which it joined in 1997, and plays their home games at Canastra Hammer Arena. Rider previously competed in the East Coast Conference (ECC) from 1966 to 1992 and the Northeast Conference (NEC) from 1992 to 1997. The Broncs have made three appearances in the NCAA tournament, most recently in 1994.

== Postseason results ==
Rider has appeared in postseason tournaments on ten occasions through the program's history. They have also qualified for three NCAA Division I Tournaments with a combined record of 0–3. The Broncs were 2–1 in their sole appearance in an NCAA Division II tournament. They have appeared in two National Invitation Tournament with a record of 0–2. In two College Basketball Invitationals they are 0–2. They have appeared in three CollegeInsider.com Tournaments with a record of 1–3. They have appeared in three NAIA Tournaments with a record 0–3.

=== NCAA Division I tournament results ===
Year	Round	Opponent	Result
1984	Preliminary round	Richmond	L 65–89
1993	First round	Kentucky	L 52–96
1994	First round	Connecticut	L 46–64

=== NCAA Division II tournament results ===
Year	Round	Opponent	Result
1957	First round Second round Elite Eight	Drexel; St. Michael's; Mount St. Mary's	W 63–61; W 69–68; L 66–86

=== NIT results ===
Year	Round	Opponent	Result
1998	First round	Penn State	L 68–82
2018	First round	Oregon	L 86–99

=== CBI results ===
Year	Round	Opponent	Result
2008	First round	Old Dominion	L 65–68
2015	First round	Loyola–Chicago	L 59–62

=== CIT results ===
Year	Round	Opponent	Result
2009	First round	Liberty	L 64–79
2011	First round	Northern Iowa	L 50–84
2013	First round Second round	Hartford; East Carolina	W 63–54; L 54–75

=== NAIA tournament results ===
Year	Round	Opponent	Result
1956	First round	Rockhust	L 59–81
1958	First round	Georgetown (KY)	L 76–93
1963	First round	Carson–Newman	L 57–83

== Notable players ==
=== Retired numbers ===
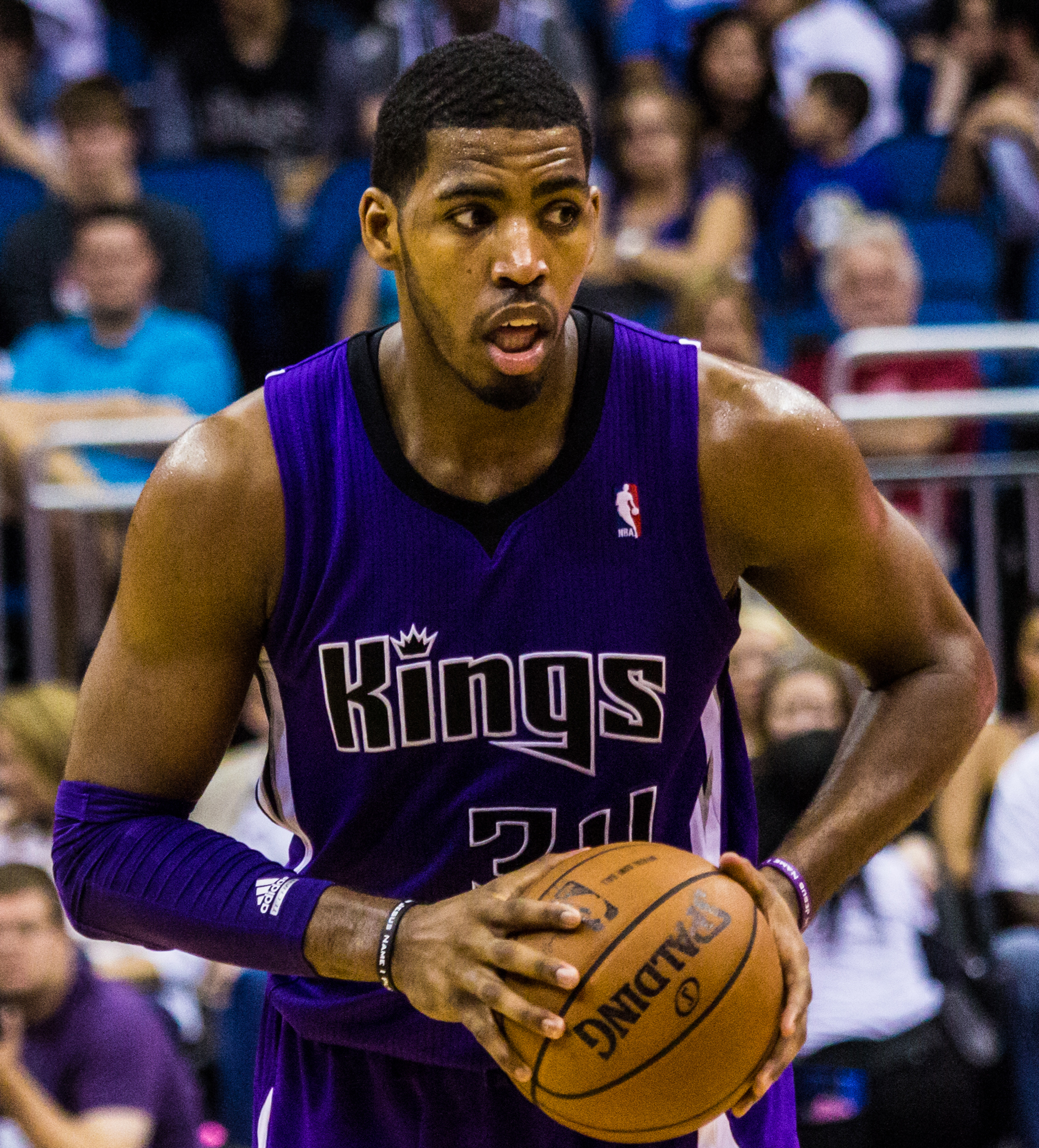
Jason Thompson, who made a profesional career at Sacramento Kings and other NBA teams, has his #1 retired by Rider

Rider Broncs retired numbers
No.	Player	Pos.	Career	No. ret.	Ref.
1	Jason Thompson	C	2004–2008	2009	
4	Darrick Suber	G	1989–1993		

=== NBA players ===
Draft year	Pos.	Player	NBA years	Notes
1948	PG	Herb Krautblatt	1	Played 10 games for Baltimore Bullets, drafted in sixth round
2008	PF	Jason Thompson	8	Drafted 12th overall by Sacramento Kings, played seven seasons for Kings and one split between Golden State Warriors and Toronto Raptors
