= Mount St. Mary's Mountaineers men's basketball =

2026–27 Mount St. Mary's Mountaineers men's basketball team
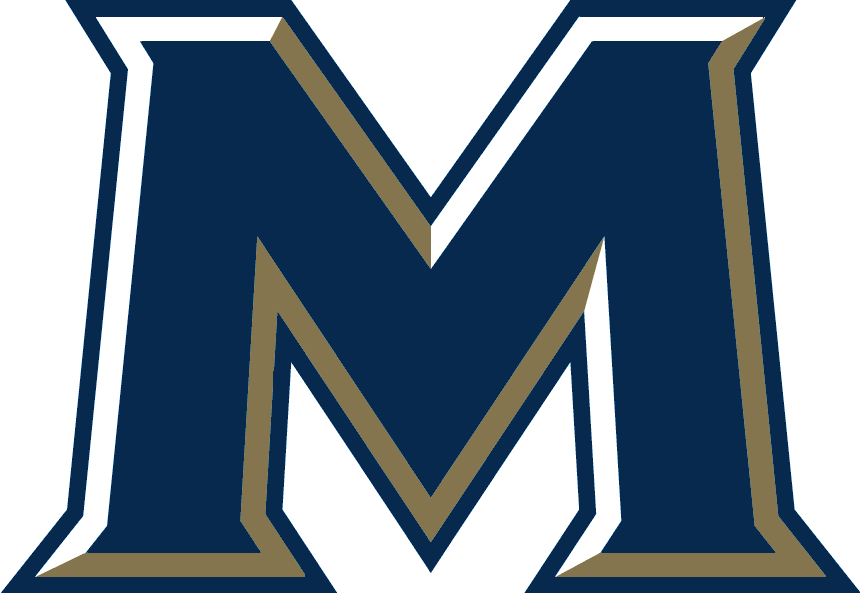
- University: Mount St. Mary's University
- Head coach: Donny Lind (3rd season)
- Location: Emmitsburg, Maryland
- Arena: Knott Arena (capacity: 3,121)
- Conference: Metro
- Nickname: Mountaineers
- Colors: Blue and white

NCAA Division I tournament champions
- 1962*
Other NCAA Division I tournament results
Runner-up	1981*
Final Four	1957*, 1961*, 1962*, 1981*, 1985*
Elite Eight	1957*, 1961*, 1962*, 1981*, 1985*
Sweet Sixteen	1957*, 1961*, 1962*, 1969*, 1981*, 1982*, 1985*, 1986*, 1987*
Appearances	1957*, 1961*, 1962*, 1963*, 1967*, 1969*, 1970*, 1979*, 1980*, 1981*, 1982*, 1985*, 1986*, 1987*, 1995, 1999, 2008, 2014, 2017, 2021, 2025

Conference tournament champions
- Mason–Dixon Conference - 1944, 1954, 1955, 1956, 1957, 1961, 1962, 1963, 1967, 1986, 1988 Northeast Conference - 1995, 1999, 2008, 2014, 2017, 2021 Metro Atlantic Athletic Conference - 2025

Conference regular-season champions
- Northeast Conference - 1996, 2017

Uniforms
Home	Away
- * at Division II level

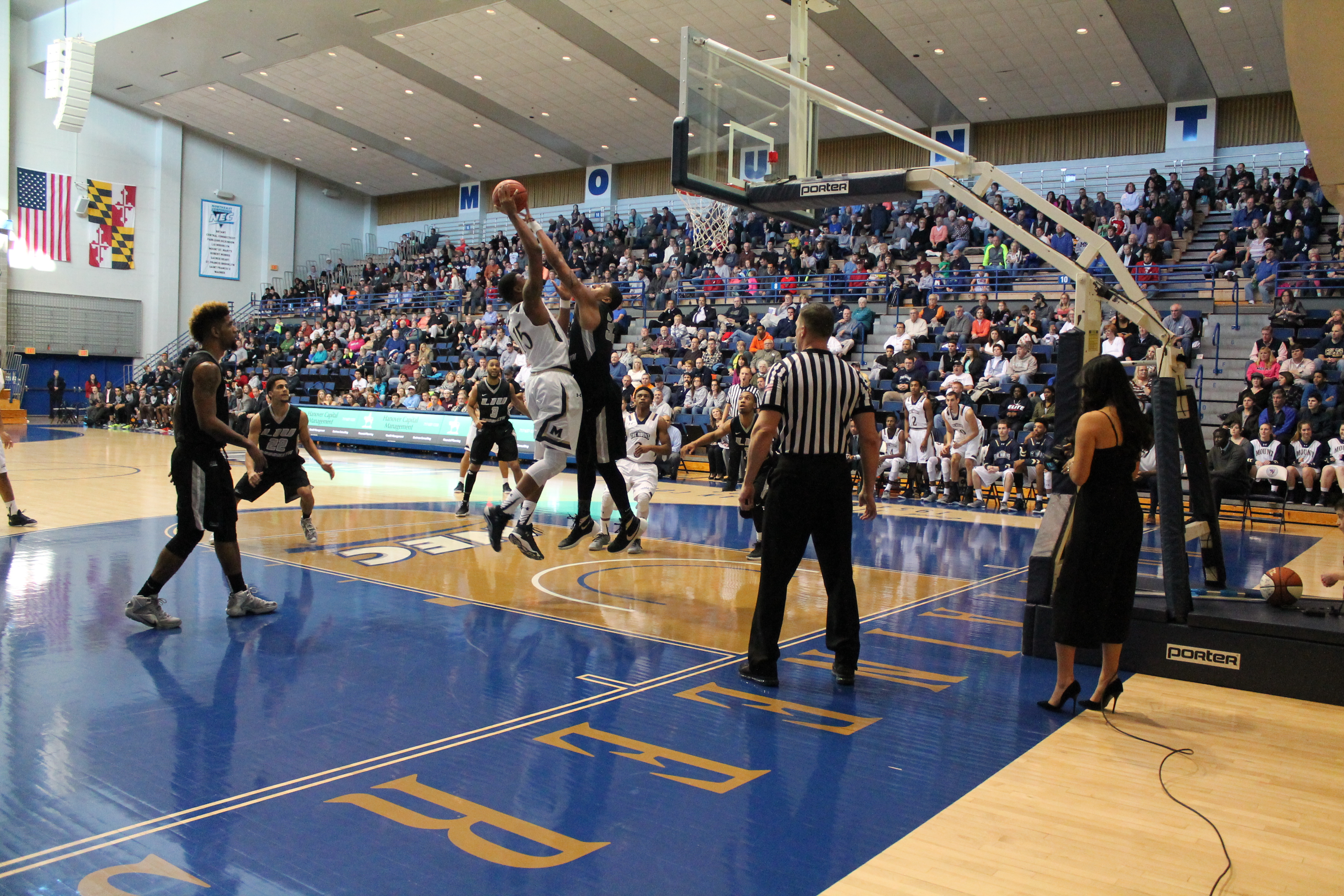
Mount St. Mary's player Gregory Graves takes a shot during a game against LIU Brooklyn at Knott Arena on January 2, 2016.

The Mount St. Mary's Mountaineers men's basketball team represents Mount St. Mary's University in Emmitsburg, Maryland, United States. Donny Lind is the program's current head coach since April 20, 2024. They competed in the Northeast Conference (NEC) from 1989 until July 1, 2022, when the university joined the Metro Atlantic Athletic Conference, and play their home games at Knott Arena. The Mountaineers were NCAA College Division National Champions in 1962 and NCAA Division II runner-up in 1981. Since moving to Division I in 1989, the Mountaineers have played in seven NCAA tournaments, most recently in 2025. Mount St. Mary's has a 3–7 all-time record at the NCAA Division I tournament, with opening round wins over Coppin State, New Orleans and American.

The Mount St. Mary's basketball program likely is known best for the career of head coach Jim Phelan, who coached at Mount St. Mary's for 49 years, compiling 830 wins in 1,354 games. He was inducted into the National Collegiate Basketball Hall of Fame in 2008.

== Postseason results ==
=== NCAA Division I Tournament results ===
The Mountaineers have played in the NCAA Division I Tournament 7 times. Their combined record is 3–7.

Year	Seed	Round	Opponent	Result
1995	#16	First round	#1 Kentucky	L 67–113
1999	#16	First round	#1 Michigan State	L 53–76
2008	#16	Opening Round; First round	#16 Coppin State #1 North Carolina	W 69–60; L 74–113
2014	#16	First Four	#16 Albany	L 64–71
2017	#16	First Four; First round	#16 New Orleans #1 Villanova	W 67–66; L 56–76
2021	#16	First Four	#16 Texas Southern	L 52–60
2025	#16	First Four; First round	#16 American #1 Duke	W 83–72; L 49–93

=== NCAA Division II Tournament results ===
The Mountaineers have appeared in the NCAA Division II Tournament 14 times. Their combined record is 25–17.

Year	Round	Opponent	Result
1957	First round Second Round; Elite Eight; Final Four; National 3rd-place game	CCNY; North Carolina Central; Rider; Kentucky Wesleyan; Cal State Los Angeles	W 93–84; W 106–88; W 86–66; L 81–99; W 82–72
1961	Regional semifinals Regional Finals; Elite Eight; Final Four; National 3rd-place game	Virginia Union; Albright; Austin Peay; Wittenberg; South Dakota State	W 83–80; W 82–76; W 96–78; L 49–65; L 76–77
1962	Regional semifinals Regional Finals; Elite Eight; Final Four; National Championship Game	Albright; Hofstra; Wittenberg; Southern Illinois; Sacramento State	W 67–64 ^{OT} W 66–54; W 43–39; W 58–57; W 58–57 ^{OT}
1963	Regional semifinals Regional 3rd-place game	Bloomsburg; Philadelphia	L 61–76; L 48–54
1967	Regional semifinals Regional 3rd-place game	Akron; Baldwin–Wallace	L 72–98; L 82–106
1969	Regional semifinals Regional Finals	Norfolk State; Oglethorpe	W 95–80; L 56–74
1970	Regional semifinals Regional 3rd-place game	Stetson; Old Dominion	L 77–78; L 90–93
1979	Regional semifinals Regional 3rd-place game	UMBC; Roanoke	L 74–79; W 93–89
1980	Regional semifinals Regional 3rd-place game	Virginia Union; Benedict	L 70–72; W 84–82
1981	Regional semifinals Regional Finals; Elite Eight; Final Four; National Championship Game	Cheyney; Elizabeth City State; Northern Michigan; Green Bay; Florida Southern	W 81–75; W 78–76; W 88–74; W 76–60; L 68–73
1982	Regional semifinals Regional Finals	Virginia State; UDC	W 90–86; L 66–67
1985	Regional semifinals Regional Finals; Elite Eight; Final Four	Randolph–Macon; Winston-Salem State; C.W. Post; South Dakota State	W 62–52 ^{3OT} W 63–56; W 69–67; L 71–78
1986	Regional semifinals Regional Finals	Winston-Salem State; Norfolk State	W 74–71; L 75–78
1987	Regional semifinals Regional Finals	Virginia Union; Norfolk State	W 94–84; L 66–70

=== NIT results ===
The Mountaineers have appeared in the National Invitation Tournament (NIT) one time. Their record is 0–1.

Year	Round	Opponent	Result
1996	First round	Illinois State	L 49–73

=== CIT results ===
The Mountaineers have appeared in the CollegeInsider.com Postseason Tournament (CIT) one time. Their record is 0–1.

Year	Round	Opponent	Result
2009	First round	James Madison	L 58–69

== Mountaineers in professional basketball ==
The following Mountaineer players have played in the NBA:

- Fred Carter
- Bob Riley

The following Mountaineer players have played in other professional leagues:

- Elijah Mitrou-Long (born 1996), Canadian-Greek basketball player for Hapoel Holon of the Israeli Basketball Premier League
- John F. Sullivan, American Basketball League[Junior robinson] Euroleague

== See also ==
- Jim Phelan Award
