= Metro Conference men's basketball tournament =

Annual college basketball tournament

- Sport: College basketball
- Conference: Metro Conference
- Number of teams: 11
- Format: Single-elimination tournament
- Current stadium: Boardwalk Hall
- Current location: Atlantic City, NJ
- Played: 1982–present
- Last contest: 2025
- Current champion: Siena
- Most championships: Iona Gaels (13)
- Official website: TheMetro.org Men's Basketball

The Metro Conference men's basketball tournament is the conference championship tournament in basketball for the Metro Conference (Metro). The tournament has been held every year since 1982, the conference's first season. It is a single-elimination tournament and seeding is based on regular season records. The winner, declared conference champion, receives the conference's automatic bid to the NCAA men's basketball tournament. The MAAC did not receive its automatic bid from the NCAA until 1984.

The conference, originally known as the Metro Atlantic Athletic Conference, changed its name to Metro Conference on July 1, 2026. It should not be confused with the other Metro Conference which operated from 1975 to 1995 before merging with the Great Midwest Conference to form the current Conference USA.

== History ==
The tournament has used several formats in its history, though seeding in all formats has been based strictly on conference record (with tiebreakers used as needed). When the tournament began in 1982, the conference had six members: Army, Fairfield, Fordham, Iona, Manhattan, and Saint Peter's. It used a standard single-elimination bracket that gave the 1 and 2 seeds a first-round bye into the semifinals, with the bottom four seeds playing in the first round at the highest seeded team's home court. The semifinals, and championship games were played at the Meadowlands Arena until 1990, when it was moved to the Knickerbocker Arena. The conference used this setup in the 1982, 1983, 1984, 1988, and 1989 tournaments. After the 1989 tournament, each game would be played at a venue chosen by the league. 1982, 1984, and 1985 also implemented a consolation game played by the losers of the semifinal round.

In 1984, the conference expanded to eight teams, adding La Salle and Holy Cross, and no longer giving the 1 and 2 seeds first round/quarterfinal byes. In 1990, the conference expanded again, adding Canisius, Loyola MD, Niagara, and Siena to bring the number of teams to twelve. To compensate for this, the MAAC was broken into North and South divisions. 1991 saw the conference lose Army, Holy Cross and Fordham to the Patriot League, thus bringing the total number of members to nine. This tournament setup used an 8 vs 9 play-in game in the first round. This setup continued for two seasons until La Salle left the MAAC for the Mid Western Collegiate Conference, bringing current membership to eight teams again.

Starting in 1993, the MAAC went back to the previous setup for eight teams, 1 vs. 8, 4 vs. 5, 3 vs. 6, and 2 vs. 7. This system was used until 1998, when the MAAC expanded yet again, adding Marist and Rider from the NEC. With ten teams, a first round play-in format was used, with the bottom four teams playing a first round "play-in" game. The 1 seed would play in the quarterfinals against the highest remaining seed from the first round. This format was used until 2003, when the MAAC implemented a new format, and expanded to the bottom six teams playing in the first round, and giving the 1 seed a bye into the semifinals. The reasoning was to place a significant premium on in-season play. In 2007, they ended the change, citing the NIT awarding bids to conference regular season champions who fail to win their conference's tournament championship. Instead of the 1 seed playing the highest remaining seed from the first round, the MAAC used a basic bracket style. 7 vs. 10 and 8 vs. 9 in the first round, with the 8/9 winner facing the 1 seed, and the 7/10 winner facing the 2 seed. This continued through 2013, when the MAAC expanded once more.

In the spring of 2014, the MAAC added Monmouth and Quinnipiac from the Northeast Conference, while losing Loyola MD to the Patriot League. This brought the MAAC to eleven members, and the first round was again expanded to include the bottom six teams competing in the play-in round. As of 2022, this is the current system being used.

== List of finals ==
Year	Champion	Score	Runner-up	Tournament MVP	Location
1982	Iona	66–61 ^{OT}	Saint Peter's	Rory Grimes, Iona	Campus Sites – first round Meadowlands Arena (East Rutherford, New Jersey) – semifinals and finals
1983	Fordham	54–53	Iona	Mark Murphy, Fordham	Campus Sites – first round Meadowlands Arena (East Rutherford, New Jersey) – semifinals and finals
1984	Iona	72–61	Fordham	Steve Burtt, Sr., Iona	New Haven Coliseum (New Haven, Connecticut) – first round Meadowlands Arena (East Rutherford, New Jersey) – semifinals and finals
1985	Iona	57–54	Fordham	Tony Hargraves, Iona	Meadowlands Arena (East Rutherford, New Jersey)
1986	Fairfield	67–64	Holy Cross	Jim McCaffrey, Holy Cross	Meadowlands Arena (East Rutherford, New Jersey)
1987	Fairfield	73–70 ^{OT}	Iona	Kevin Houston, Army	Meadowlands Arena (East Rutherford, New Jersey)
1988	La Salle	79–70	Fordham	Rich Tarr, La Salle	Campus sites – first round Meadowlands Arena (East Rutherford, New Jersey) – semifinals and finals
1989	La Salle	71–58	Saint Peter's	Lionel Simmons, La Salle	Campus sites – first round Meadowlands Arena (East Rutherford, New Jersey) – semifinals and finals
1990	La Salle	71–61	Fordham	Lionel Simmons, La Salle	Knickerbocker Arena (Albany, New York)
1991	Saint Peter's	64–58	Iona	Marvin Andrews, Saint Peter's	Knickerbocker Arena (Albany, New York)
1992	La Salle	79–78	Manhattan	Randy Woods, La Salle	Knickerbocker Arena (Albany, New York)
1993	Manhattan	68–67	Niagara	Keith Bullock, Manhattan	Knickerbocker Arena (Albany, New York)
1994	Loyola	80–75	Manhattan	Tracy Bergan, Loyola	Knickerbocker Arena (Albany, New York)
1995	Saint Peter's	80–78 ^{OT}	Manhattan	Randy Holmes, Saint Peter's	Knickerbocker Arena (Albany, New York)
1996	Canisius	52–46	Fairfield	Michael Meeks, Canisius	Knickerbocker Arena (Albany, New York)
1997	Fairfield	78–72	Canisius	Greg Francis, Fairfield	Marine Midland Arena (Buffalo, New York)
1998	Iona	90–75	Siena	John McDonald, Iona	Pepsi Arena (Albany, New York)
1999	Siena	82–67	Saint Peter's	Marcus Faison, Siena	Marine Midland Arena (Buffalo, New York)
2000	Iona	84–80	Siena	Dyree Wilson, Iona	Pepsi Arena (Albany, New York)
2001	Iona	74–67	Canisius	Nakiea Miller, Iona	Marine Midland Arena (Buffalo, New York)
2002	Siena	92–77	Niagara	Dwayne Archbold, Siena	Pepsi Arena (Albany, New York)
2003	Manhattan	69–54	Fairfield	Luis Flores, Manhattan	Sovereign Bank Arena (Trenton, New Jersey)
2004	Manhattan	62–61	Niagara	Luis Flores, Manhattan	Pepsi Arena (Albany, New York)
2005	Niagara	81–59	Rider	Juan Mendez, Niagara	HSBC Arena (Buffalo, New York)
2006	Iona	80–61	Saint Peter's	Steve Burtt Jr., Iona	Pepsi Arena (Albany, New York)
2007	Niagara	83–79	Siena	Tyrone Lewis, Niagara	Arena at Harbor Yard (Bridgeport, Connecticut)
2008	Siena	74–53	Rider	Kenny Hasbrouck, Siena	Times Union Center (Albany, New York)
2009	Siena	77–70	Niagara	Kenny Hasbrouck, Siena	Times Union Center (Albany, New York)
2010	Siena	72–65 ^{OT}	Fairfield	Alex Franklin, Siena	Times Union Center (Albany, New York)
2011	Saint Peter's	62–57	Iona	Jeron Belin, Saint Peter's	Webster Bank Arena (Bridgeport, Connecticut)
2012	Loyola	48–44	Fairfield	Erik Etherly, Loyola	MassMutual Center (Springfield, Massachusetts)
2013	Iona	60–57	Manhattan	Lamont Jones, Iona	MassMutual Center (Springfield, Massachusetts)
2014	Manhattan	71–68	Iona	George Beamon, Manhattan	MassMutual Center (Springfield, Massachusetts)
2015	Manhattan	79–69	Iona	Ashton Pankey, Manhattan	Times Union Center (Albany, New York)
2016	Iona	79–76	Monmouth	A. J. English, Iona	Times Union Center (Albany, New York)
2017	Iona	87–86 ^{OT}	Siena	Jordan Washington, Iona	Times Union Center (Albany, New York)
2018	Iona	83–71	Fairfield	Zach Lewis, Iona	Times Union Center (Albany, New York)
2019	Iona	81–60	Monmouth	Rickey McGill, Iona	Times Union Center (Albany, New York)
2020	Canceled due to the coronavirus pandemic				Boardwalk Hall (Atlantic City, New Jersey)
2021	Iona	60–51	Fairfield	Asante Gist, Iona	Boardwalk Hall (Atlantic City, New Jersey)
2022	Saint Peter's	60–54	Monmouth	KC Ndefo, Saint Peter's	Boardwalk Hall (Atlantic City, New Jersey)
2023	Iona	76–55	Marist	Daniss Jenkins, Iona	Boardwalk Hall (Atlantic City, New Jersey)
2024	Saint Peter's	68–63	Fairfield	Corey Washington, Saint Peter's	Boardwalk Hall (Atlantic City, New Jersey)
2025	Mount St. Mary's	63–49	Iona	Dola Adebayo, Mount St. Mary's	Boardwalk Hall (Atlantic City, New Jersey)
2026	Siena	64–54	Merrimack	Gavin Doty, Siena	Boardwalk Hall (Atlantic City, New Jersey)

== Results by team ==
All records are completed through championship game of 2021–22 season

=== Team win–loss records ===
School	Games	W	L	Winning Pct.	Avg. seed	Years
Iona	89	61	28	.685	3.51	41 (1982–2022)
Saint Peter's	77	40	37	.519	5.44	41 (1982–2022)
Fairfield	74	35	39	.473	5.83	41 (1982–2022)
Siena	67	40	27	.597	4.3	33 (1990–2022)
Manhattan	66	30	36	.455	5.44	41 (1982–2022)
Canisius	57	25	32	.439	6.48	33 (1990–2022)
Niagara	56	26	30	.464	5.27	33 (1990–2022)
Rider	41	17	24	.415	5	25 (1998–2022)
Marist	36	11	25	.306	7.2	25 (1998–2022)
Loyola MD †	33	11	22	.333	6.38	24 (1990–2013)
Fordham †	21	13	8	.619	3.44	9 (1982–1990)
La Salle †	20	14	6	.700	1.89	9 (1984–1992)
Monmouth †	17	9	8	.529	4.33	9 (2014–2022)
Army †	14	5	9	.357	5.44	9 (1982–1990)
Quinnipiac	13	5	8	.385	6.67	9 (2014–2022)
Holy Cross †	11	4	7	.364	4.43	7 (1984–1990)

- ^{†} No longer a member of the Metro Conference

=== Championship game team win–loss records ===
School	Games	W	L	Winning Pct.	Last Championship	Last Game
Iona	21	14	7	.667	2023	2025
Siena	10	6	4	.600	2026	2026
Fairfield	10	3	7	.333	1997	2024
Saint Peter's	9	5	4	.556	2024	2024
Manhattan	9	5	4	.556	2015	2015
Niagara	6	2	4	.333	2007	2009
Fordham †	5	1	4	.200	1983	1990
La Salle †	4	4	0	1.000	1992	1992
Canisius	3	1	2	.000	1996	2001
Loyola MD †	2	2	0	1.000	2012	2012
Monmouth †	3	0	3	.000		2022
Rider	2	0	2	.000		2008
Mount St. Mary's	1	1	0	1.000	2025	2025
Holy Cross †	1	0	1	.000		1986
Marist	1	0	1	.000		2023
Merrimack	1	0	1	.000		2026
Army †	0	0	0	–		
Quinnipiac	0	0	0	–		

- ^{†} No longer a member of the MAAC

=== Team head-to-head results ===
	Army †	Canisius	Fairfield	Fordham †	Holy Cross †	Iona	La Salle †	Loyola MD †	Manhattan	Marist	Monmouth †	Niagara	Quinnipiac	Rider	Saint Peter's	Siena
vs. Army †	–	0–0	1–0	2–1	1–0	4–0	0–1	0–0	0–1	0–0	0–0	0–0	0–0	0–0	1–2	0–0
vs. Canisius	0–0	–	3–2	0–0	0–0	6–3	0–0	1–6	0–2	3–3	2–0	3–4	1–0	4–1	4–1	5–3
vs. Fairfield	0–1	2–3	–	2–0	0–1	4–4	3–1	5–0	5–7	1–2	1–1	1–4	0–1	1–2	7–7	7–1
vs. Fordham †	1–2	0–0	0–2	–	0–1	3–2	3–1	0–1	0–1	0–0	0–0	0–0	0–0	0–0	1–3	0–0
vs. Holy Cross †	0–1	0–0	1–0	1–0	–	3–2	1–1	0–0	0–0	0–0	0–0	0–0	0–0	0–0	1–0	0–0
vs. Iona	0–4	3–6	4–4	2–3	2–3	–	0–0	0–4	4–3	2–4	0–3	5–3	0–1	2–4	4–8	0–11
vs. La Salle †	1–0	0–0	1–3	1–3	1–1	0–0	–	0–1	0–3	0–0	0–0	0–0	0–0	0–0	2–1	0–2
vs. Loyola †	0–0	6–1	0–5	1–0	0–0	4–0	1–0	–	4–1	0–0	0–0	3–2	0–0	1–0	1–1	1–1
vs. Manhattan	1–0	2–0	7–5	1–0	0–0	3–4	3–0	1–4	–	0–2	0–0	1–4	0–1	3–1	5–7	9–2
vs. Marist	0–0	3–3	2–1	0–0	0–0	4–2	0–0	0–0	2–0	–	0–0	5–2	1–1	1–1	1–1	6–0
vs. Monmouth †	0–0	0–2	1–1	0–0	0–0	3–0	0–0	0–0	0–0	0–0	–	0–3	0–1	1–2	2–0	1–0
vs. Niagara	0–0	4–3	4–1	0–0	0–0	3–5	0–0	2–3	4–1	2–5	3–0	–	1–1	0–3	2–1	5–3
vs. Quinnipiac	0–0	0–1	1–0	0–0	0–0	1–0	0–0	0–0	1–0	1–1	1–0	1–1	–	1–0	1–0	0–2
vs. Rider	0–0	1–4	2–1	0–0	0–0	4–2	0–0	0–1	1–3	1–1	2–1	3–0	0–1	–	6–3	4–0
vs. Saint Peter's	2–1	1–4	7–7	0–0	0–1	8–4	1–2	1–1	7–5	1–1	0–2	1–2	0–1	3–6	–	2–2
vs. Siena	0–0	3–5	1–7	0–0	0–0	11–0	2–0	1–1	2–9	0–6	0–1	3–5	2–0	0–4	2–2	–
Total	5–9	25–32	35–39	13–8	4–7	61–28	14–6	11–22	30–36	11–25	9–8	26–30	5–8	17–24	40–37	40–27

- ^{†} No longer a member of the MAAC

=== Championship game team head-to-head results ===
	Army †	Canisius	Fairfield	Fordham †	Holy Cross †	Iona	La Salle †	Loyola MD †	Manhattan	Marist	Monmouth †	Niagara	Quinnipiac	Rider	Saint Peter's	Siena
vs. Army †	–	0–0	0–0	0–0	0–0	0–0	0–0	0–0	0–0	0–0	0–0	0–0	0–0	0–0	0–0	0–0
vs. Canisius	0–0	–	1–1	0–0	0–0	1–0	0–0	0–0	0–0	0–0	0–0	0–0	0–0	0–0	0–0	0–0
vs. Fairfield	0–0	1–1	–	0–0	0–1	2–1	0–0	1–0	1–0	0–0	0–0	0–0	0–0	0–0	0–0	1–0
vs. Fordham †	0–0	0–0	0–0	–	0–0	2–1	2–0	0–0	0–0	0–0	0–0	0–0	0–0	0–0	0–0	0–0
vs. Holy Cross †	0–0	0–0	1–0	0–0	–	0–0	0–0	0–0	0–0	0–0	0–0	0–0	0–0	0–0	0–0	0–0
vs. Iona	0–0	0–1	1–2	1–2	0–0	–	0–0	0–0	2–1	0–0	0–2	0–0	0–0	0–0	2–2	0–3
vs. La Salle †	0–0	0–0	0–0	0–2	0–0	0–0	–	0–0	0–1	0–0	0–0	0–0	0–0	0–0	0–1	0–0
vs. Loyola †	0–0	0–0	0–1	0–0	0–0	0–0	0–0	–	0–1	0–0	0–0	0–0	0–0	0–0	0–0	0–0
vs. Manhattan	0–0	0–0	0–1	0–0	0–0	1–2	1–0	1–0	–	0–0	0–0	0–2	0–0	0–0	1–0	0–0
vs. Marist	0–0	0–0	0–0	0–0	0–0	0–0	0–0	0–0	0–0	–	0–0	0–0	0–0	0–0	0–0	0–0
vs. Monmouth †	0–0	0–0	0–0	0–0	0–0	2–0	0–0	0–0	0–0	0–0	–	0–0	0–0	0–0	1–0	0–0
vs. Niagara	0–0	0–0	0–0	0–0	0–0	0–0	0–0	0–0	2–0	0–0	0–0	–	0–0	0–1	0–0	2–1
vs. Quinnipiac	0–0	0–0	0–0	0–0	0–0	0–0	0–0	0–0	0–0	0–0	0–0	0–0	–	0–0	0–0	0–0
vs. Rider	0–0	0–0	0–0	0–0	0–0	0–0	0–0	0–0	0–0	0–0	0–0	1–0	0–0	–	0–0	1–0
vs. Saint Peter's	0–0	0–0	0–0	0–0	0–0	2–2	1–0	0–0	0–1	0–0	0–1	0–0	0–0	0–0	–	1–0
vs. Siena	0–0	0–0	0–1	0–0	0–0	3–0	0–0	0–0	0–0	0–0	0–0	1–2	0–0	0–1	0–1	–
Total	0–0	1–2	3–6	1–4	0–1	13–6	4–0	2–0	5–4	0–0	0–3	2–4	0–0	0–2	4–4	5–4

- ^{†} No longer a member of the MAAC

== NCAA Tournament appearances ==
NCAA tournament
Year	MAAC Rep.	Opponent	Result
1984	(10) Iona	(7) Virginia	L 57–58
1985	(13) Iona	(4) Loyola-Chicago	L 58–59
1986	(13) Fairfield	(4) Illinois	L 51–75
1987	(16) Fairfield	(1) Indiana	L 58–92
1988	(13) La Salle	(4) Kansas State	L 53–66
1989	(8) La Salle	(9) Louisiana Tech	L 74–83
1990	(4) La Salle	(13) Southern Miss (5) Clemson	W 79–63; L 75–79
1991	(12) Saint Peter's	(5) Texas	L 65–73
1992	(13) La Salle	(4) Seton Hall	L 76–78
1993	(11) Manhattan	(6) Virginia	L 66–78
1994	(15) Loyola (MD)	(2) Arizona	L 55–81
1995	(15) Saint Peter's	(2) UMass	L 51–68
1995	(13) Manhattan	(4) Oklahoma (5) Arizona State	W 77–67; L 54–64
1996	(13) Canisius	(4) Utah	L 43–72
1997	(16) Fairfield	(1) North Carolina	L 74–82
1998	(12) Iona	(5) Syracuse	L 61–63
1999	(13) Siena	(4) Arkansas	L 80–94
2000	(14) Iona	(3) Maryland	L 59–74
2001	(14) Iona	(3) Ole Miss	L 70–72
2002	(16a) Siena (16) Siena	(16b) Alcorn State (1) Maryland	W 81–77; L 70–85
2003	(14) Manhattan	(3) Syracuse	L 65–76
2004	(12) Manhattan	(5) Florida (4) Wake Forest	W 75–60; L 80–84
2005	(14) Niagara	(3) Oklahoma	L 67–84
2006	(13) Iona	(4) LSU	L 64–80
2007	(65) Niagara (16) Niagara	(64) Florida A&M (1) Kansas	W 77–69; L 67–107
2008	(13) Siena	(4) Vanderbilt (12) Villanova	W 83–62; L 72–84
2009	(9) Siena	(8) Ohio State (1) Louisville	W 74–72; L 72–79
2010	(13) Siena	(4) Purdue	L 64–72
2011	(14) Saint Peter's	(3) Purdue	L 43–65
2012	(15) Loyola (MD)	(2) Ohio State	L 59–78
2012	(14) Iona	(14) BYU	L 72–78
2013	(15) Iona	(2) Ohio State	L 70–95
2014	(13) Manhattan	(4) Louisville	L 64–71
2015	(16) Manhattan	(16) Hampton	L 64–74
2016	(13) Iona	(4) Iowa State	L 81–94
2017	(14) Iona	(3) Oregon	L 77–93
2018	(15) Iona	(2) Duke	L 67–89
2019	(16) Iona	(1) North Carolina	L 73–88
2021	(15) Iona	(2) Alabama	L 55–68
2022	(15) Saint Peter's	(2) Kentucky (7) Murray State (3) Purdue (8) North Carolina	W 85–79^{OT} W 70–60; W 67–64; L 49–69
2023	(13) Iona	(4) UConn	L 63–87
2024	(15) Saint Peter's	(2) Tennessee	L 49–83
2025	(16) Mount St. Mary's	(16) American (1) Duke	W 83–72; L 49–93
2026	(16) Siena	(1) Duke	L 65–71

- 2020 NCAA tournament was canceled due to COVID-19.

== Results by seed ==
Completed through championship game of 2021–22 season

=== Seed win–loss records ===
Seed	Games	W	L	Win pct
1	96	69	27	.719
2	97	66	31	.680
3	76	41	35	.539
4	77	38	39	.494
5	67	28	39	.418
6	69	27	42	.391
7	72	36	36	.500
8	52	15	37	.288
9	45	19	26	.422
10	27	2	25	.074
11	14	5	9	.357

=== Championship game seed win–loss records ===
Seed	Games	W	L	Win pct	Last title	Last game
1	23	15	8	.652	2019	2019
2	23	10	13	.435	2022	2022
3	9	6	3	.667	2017	2017
4	11	3	8	.273	2018	2022
5	4	2	2	.500	1996	2006
6	4	0	4	.000		2019
7	4	2	2	.500	2007	2021
8	1	1	0	1.000	1997	1997
9	1	1	0	1.000	2021	2021
10	0	0	0	–		
11	0	0	0	–		

== Results by coach ==
Completed through championship game of 2021–22 season

=== Coach win–loss records ===
Current Metro coaches
Coach	School	Games	Wins	Losses	Win pct	Years
John Dunne	Saint Peter's/Marist	24	9	15	.375	16 (2007–2022)
Steve Masiello	Manhattan	20	11	9	.550	11 (2012–2022)
Kevin Baggett	Rider	15	6	9	.400	10 (2013–2022)
Reggie Witherspoon	Canisius	8	2	6	.250	6 (2017–2022)
Baker Dunleavy	Quinnipiac	8	4	4	.500	5 (2018–2022)
Jay Young	Fairfield	7	4	3	.571	3 (2020–2022)
Rick Pitino	Iona	5	4	1	.800	2 (2021–2022)
Greg Paulus	Niagara	4	2	2	.500	3 (2020–2022)
Carmen Maciariello	Siena	3	1	2	.333	3 (2020–2022)

Former MAAC/Metro coaches
Coach	School	Games	Wins	Losses	Win pct	Years
Joe Mihalich	Niagara	31	18	13	.581	15 (1999–2013)
Tim Cluess	Iona	26	22	4	.846	9 (2011–2019)
Jimmy Patsos	Loyola/Siena	22	9	13	.409	14 (2005–2018)
Jeff Ruland	Iona	19	13	6	.684	9 (1999–2007)
Ted Fiore	Saint Peter's	18	11	7	.611	9 (1987–1995)
Mitch Buonaguro	Fairfield/Siena	17	10	7	.588	9 (1986–1991)/(2011–2013)
Mike MacDonald	Canisius	17	8	9	.471	9 (1998–2006)
King Rice	Monmouth	17	9	8	.529	8 (2014–2022)
Sydney Johnson	Fairfield	16	8	8	.500	8 (2012–2019)
Speedy Morris	La Salle	15	13	2	.867	6 (1987–92)
Fran McCaffery	Siena	13	11	2	.846	5 (2006–2010)
Tommy Dempsey	Rider	13	6	7	.462	7 (2006–2012)
Don Harnum	Rider	13	5	8	.385	8 (1998–2005)
Jack Armstrong	Niagara	13	4	9	.308	9 (1990–1998)
Pat Kennedy	Iona	13	11	2	.846	5 (1982–1986)
Tim O'Toole	Fairfield	13	5	8	.385	8 (1999–2006)
Les Wothke	Army	13	5	8	.385	8 (1983–1990)
John Beilein	Canisius	12	8	4	.667	5 (1993–1997)
Paul Cormier	Fairfield	12	6	6	.500	7 (1992–1998)
Bob Dukiet	Saint Peter's	12	6	6	.500	5 (1982–1986)
Tom Penders	Fordham	11	7	4	.636	5 (1982–1986)
Bob Leckie	Saint Peter's	11	5	6	.455	6 (2001–2006)
Dave Magarity	Marist	11	4	7	.364	7 (1998–2004)
George Blaney	Holy Cross	11	4	7	.364	7 (1984–1990)
Tom Parrotta	Canisius	10	4	6	.400	6 (2007–2012)
Gary Brokaw	Iona	10	5	5	.500	5 (1987–1991)
Fran Fraschilla	Manhattan	10	7	3	.700	4 (1993–1996)
Bobby Gonzalez	Manhattan	10	5	5	.500	7 (2000–2006)
Mike Deane	Siena	10	5	5	.500	5 (1990–1994)
Rob Lanier	Siena	10	7	3	.700	4 (2002–2005)
Paul Hewitt	Siena	9	7	2	.778	3 (1998–2000)
Nick Macarchuk	Fordham	9	6	3	.667	3 (1988–1990)
Ed Cooley	Fairfield	9	4	5	.444	5 (2007–2011)
Shaheen Holloway	Saint Peter's	8	6	2	.750	4 (2019–2022)
Chuck Martin	Marist	8	3	5	.375	5 (2009–2013)
Chris Casey	Niagara	8	2	6	.250	6 (2014–2019)
Rodger Blind	Saint Peter's	8	3	5	.375	5 (1996–2000)
Matt Brady	Marist	7	3	4	.429	4 (2005–2008)
Barry Rohrssen	Manhattan	7	2	5	.286	5 (2007–2011)
Jim Baron	Canisius	6	2	4	.333	4 (2013–2016)
Terry O'Connor	Fairfield	6	1	5	.167	4 (1982–1985)
Tim Welsh	Iona	6	4	2	.667	3 (1996–1998)
Steve Lappas	Manhattan	6	2	4	.333	4 (1989–1992)
Tom Moore	Quinnipiac	5	1	4	.200	4 (2014–2017)
Mike Maker	Marist	5	1	4	.200	4 (2015–2018)
John Leonard	Manhattan	5	2	3	.400	3 (1997–1999)
Scott Hicks	Loyola	5	1	4	.200	4 (2001–2004)
Dino Gaudio	Loyola	5	2	3	.400	3 (1998–2000)
Lefty Ervin	La Salle	5	1	4	.200	3 (1984–1986)
Jerry Welsh	Iona	5	1	4	.200	4 (1992–1995)
Marty Marbach	Canisius	5	2	3	.400	3 (1990–1992)
Gordon Chiesa	Manhattan	4	0	4	.000	4 (1982–1985)
Bob Beyer	Siena	3	0	3	.000	3 (1995–1997)
Brian Ellerbe	Loyola	3	0	3	.000	3 (1995–1997)
Skip Prosser	Loyola	3	3	0	1.000	1 (1994)
Tom Schneider	Loyola	3	0	3	.000	3 (1990–1992)
Kevin Willard	Iona	3	0	3	.000	3 (2008–2010)
Jamion Christian	Siena	2	1	1	.500	1 (2019)
Delle Bovi	Manhattan	2	0	2	.000	2 (1987–1988)
Louis Orr	Siena	2	1	1	.500	1 (2001)
Jeff Bower	Marist	1	0	1	.000	1 (2014)
Tom Sullivan	Manhattan	1	0	1	.000	1 (1986)
Joe Boylan	Loyola	1	0	1	.000	1 (1993)
Bob Quinn	Fordham	1	0	1	.000	1 (1987)
Pete Gaudet	Army	1	0	1	.000	1 (1982)

=== Championship game coach win–loss records ===
Current Metro coaches
Coach	School	Games	Wins	Losses	Win pct	Last title	Last game
Steve Masiello	Manhattan	3	2	1	.667	2015	2015
John Dunne	Saint Peter's/Marist	1	1	0	1.000	2011	2011
Rick Pitino	Iona	1	1	0	1.000	2021	2021
Jay Young	Fairfield	1	0	1	.000		2021

Former MAAC/Metro coaches
Coach	School	Games	Wins	Losses	Win pct	Last title	Last game
Tim Cluess	Iona	8	5	3	.625	2019	2019
Joe Mihalich	Niagara	5	2	3	.400	2007	2009
Speedy Morris	La Salle	4	4	0	1.000	1992	1992
Fran McCaffery	Siena	4	3	1	.750	2010	2010
Pat Kennedy	Iona	4	3	1	.750	1985	1985
Tom Penders	Fordham	3	1	2	.333	1983	1985
Jeff Ruland	Iona	3	3	0	1.000	2006	2006
Fran Fraschilla	Manhattan	3	1	2	.333	1993	1995
Ted Fiore	Saint Peter's	3	2	1	.667	1995	1995
Paul Hewitt	Siena	3	1	2	.333	1999	2000
King Rice	Monmouth	3	0	3	.000		2022
Bobby Gonzalez	Manhattan	2	2	0	1.000	2004	2004
Gary Brokaw	Iona	2	0	2	.000		1991
Nick Macarchuk	Fordham	2	0	2	.000		1990
Sydney Johnson	Fairfield	2	0	2	.000		2018
Paul Cormier	Fairfield	2	1	1	.500	1997	1997
Mitch Buonaguro	Fairfield/Siena	2	2	0	1.000	1987	1987
John Beilein	Canisius	2	1	1	.500	1996	1997
Jimmy Patsos	Loyola/Siena	2	1	1	.500	2012	2017
Mike MacDonald	Canisius	1	0	1	.000		2001
Tim O'Toole	Fairfield	1	0	1	.000		2003
Ed Cooley	Fairfield	1	0	1	.000		2010
George Blaney	Holy Cross	1	0	1	.000		1986
Shaheen Holloway	Saint Peter's	1	1	0	1.000	2022	2022
Tim Welsh	Iona	1	1	0	1.000	1998	1998
Skip Prosser	Loyola	1	1	0	1.000	1994	1994
Steve Lappas	Manhattan	1	0	1	.000		1992
Jack Armstrong	Niagara	1	0	1	.000		1993
Tommy Dempsey	Rider	1	0	1	.000		2008
Don Harnum	Rider	1	0	1	.000		2005
Bob Dukiet	Saint Peter's	1	0	1	.000		1982
Bob Leckie	Saint Peter's	1	0	1	.000		2006
Rodger Blind	Saint Peter's	1	0	1	.000		1999
Rob Lanier	Siena	1	1	0	1.000	2002	2002

== Broadcasters ==
=== Television ===
Year	Network	Play-by-play	Analyst
2024	ESPNU	Derek Jones	Tim Welsh
2023	ESPNU	Steve Lenox	Tim Welsh
2022	ESPNU	Jason Benetti	Tim Welsh
2021	ESPNU	Tiffany Greene	Chris Spatola
2020	ESPNU	Doug Sherman	Jon Crispin
2019	ESPN2	Jason Benetti	Jordan Cornette
2018	ESPN	Jason Benetti	Jay Bilas
2017	ESPN	Sean McDonough	Jay Bilas
2016	ESPN	Dan Shulman	Jay Bilas
2015	ESPN2	Doug Sherman	Malcolm Huckaby
2014	ESPN2	Doug Sherman	Malcolm Huckaby
2013	ESPN2	Doug Sherman	Malcolm Huckaby
2012	ESPN2	Bob Wischusen	Len Elmore
2011	ESPN2	Bob Wischusen	Len Elmore
2010	ESPN2	Bob Wischusen	Tim Welsh
2009	ESPN2	Sean McDonough	Bill Raftery
2008	ESPN2	Sean McDonough	Bill Raftery and Jay Bilas
2007	ESPN2	Sean McDonough	Bill Raftery and Jay Bilas

=== Radio ===
Year	Network	Play-by-play	Analyst
2015	Westwood One	Gary Cohen	Donny Marshall

== See also ==
- Metro Conference women's basketball tournament
