= 2005 MAAC men's basketball tournament =

- Classification: Division I
- Season: 2004–05
- Teams: 10
- Site: HSBC Arena; Buffalo, New York
- Champions: Niagara (1st title)
- Winning coach: Joe Mihalich (1st title)
- MVP: Juan Mendez (Niagara)

2004–05 MAAC men's basketball standings
	Conf.				Overall
Team	W		L	PCT	W		L	PCT
Niagara †	13	–	5	.722	20	–	10	.667
Rider	13	–	5	.722	19	–	11	.633
Fairfield	11	–	7	.611	15	–	15	.500
Saint Peter's	10	–	8	.556	15	–	13	.536
Iona	9	–	9	.500	15	–	16	.484
Manhattan	9	–	9	.500	15	–	14	.517
Canisius	8	–	10	.444	11	–	18	.379
Marist	8	–	10	.444	11	–	17	.393
Loyola (MD)	5	–	13	.278	6	–	22	.214
Siena	4	–	14	.222	6	–	24	.200
† 2005 MAAC tournament winner Rankings from AP Poll

The 2005 MAAC men's basketball tournament was held March 4–7 at HSBC Arena in Buffalo, New York.

Top-seeded Niagara defeated Rider in the championship game, 81–59, to win their first MAAC men's basketball tournament.

The Purple Eagles received an automatic bid to the 2005 NCAA tournament.

== Format ==
All ten of the conference's members participated in the tournament field. They were seeded based on regular season conference records.

As the regular-season champion, top seed Niagara received a bye to the semifinals.

== Bracket ==
First round Friday, March 4
March 4
(5) Iona	68
(10) Siena	51
March 4
(7) Canisius	62
(8) Marist	60
March 4
(6) Manhattan	88
(9) Loyola (MD)	67

Quarterfinals; Saturday, March 5
March 5
(4) Saint Peter's	73
(5) Iona	97
March 5
(2) Rider	79
(7) Canisius	59
March 5
(3) Fairfield	62
(6) Manhattan	60

Semifinals; Sunday, March 6
March 6
(1) Niagara	69
(5) Iona	66
March 6
(2) Rider	76
(3) Fairfield	74

Final; Monday, March 7
March 7
(1) Niagara	81
(2) Rider	59
