= 1987 MAAC men's basketball tournament =

- Classification: Division I
- Season: 1986–87
- Teams: 8
- Site: Meadowlands Arena; East Rutherford, New Jersey
- Champions: Fairfield (2nd title)
- Winning coach: Mitch Buonaguro (2nd title)
- MVP: Kevin Houston (Army)

1986–87 MAAC men's basketball standings
	Conf.				Overall
Team	W		L	PCT	W		L	PCT
Saint Peter's	11	–	3	.786	21	–	8	.724
La Salle	10	–	4	.714	20	–	13	.606
Army	8	–	6	.571	14	–	15	.483
Iona	8	–	6	.571	16	–	14	.533
Holy Cross	6	–	8	.429	9	–	19	.321
Fordham	6	–	8	.429	14	–	16	.467
Fairfield †	5	–	9	.357	15	–	16	.484
Manhattan	2	–	12	.143	6	–	21	.222
† 1987 MAAC tournament winner Rankings from AP Poll

The 1987 MAAC men's basketball tournament was held February 28–March 2, 1987 at Meadowlands Arena in East Rutherford, New Jersey.

Seventh-seeded Fairfield defeated Iona in the championship game, 73–70, to win their second MAAC men's basketball tournament.

The Stags received an automatic bid to the 1987 NCAA tournament.

== Format ==
All eight of the conference's members participated in the tournament field. They were seeded based on regular season conference records.

== Bracket ==
Quarterfinals; Saturday, February 28
1	Saint Peter's	68
8	Manhattan	53
4	Iona	70
5	Holy Cross	57
3	Army	98
6	Fordham	94^{OT}
2	La Salle	62
7	Fairfield	75

Semifinals; Sunday, March 1
1	Saint Peter's	59
4	Iona	66
3	Army	60
7	Fairfield	65

Championship; Monday, March 2
4	Iona	70^{OT}
7	Fairfield	73
