= 1993 MAAC men's basketball tournament =

- Classification: Division I
- Season: 1992–93
- Teams: 8
- Site: Knickerbocker Arena; Albany, New York
- Champions: Manhattan (1st title)
- Winning coach: Fran Fraschilla (1st title)
- MVP: Keith Bullock (Manhattan)

1992–93 MAAC men's basketball standings
| | Conf. | | | | Overall |
| Team | W | | L | PCT | W | | L | PCT |
|---|---|---|---|---|---|---|---|---|
| Manhattan † | 12 | – | 2 | .857 | 23 | – | 7 | .767 |
| Niagara | 11 | – | 3 | .786 | 23 | – | 7 | .767 |
| Iona | 9 | – | 5 | .643 | 16 | – | 11 | .593 |
| Siena | 8 | – | 6 | .571 | 16 | – | 13 | .552 |
| Fairfield | 7 | – | 7 | .500 | 14 | – | 13 | .519 |
| Canisius | 5 | – | 9 | .357 | 10 | – | 18 | .357 |
| Saint Peter's | 3 | – | 11 | .214 | 9 | – | 18 | .333 |
| Loyola (MD) | 1 | – | 13 | .071 | 2 | – | 25 | .074 |
† 1993 MAAC tournament winner Rankings from AP Poll

The 1993 MAAC men's basketball tournament was held March 5–7, 1993 at Knickerbocker Arena in Albany, New York.

Top-seeded Manhattan defeated Niagara in the championship game, 68–67, to win their first MAAC men's basketball tournament.

The Jaspers received an automatic bid to the 1993 NCAA tournament.

== Format ==
All eight of the conference's members participated in the tournament field. They were seeded based on regular season conference records.

== Bracket ==
Quarterfinals; Friday, March 5
1 | Manhattan | 57
8 | Loyola (MD) | 37
4 | Siena | 70
5 | Fairfield | 61
3 | Iona | 62
6 | Canisius | 64
2 | Niagara | 84
7 | Saint Peter's | 60

Semifinals; Saturday, March 6
1 | Manhattan | 71
4 | Siena | 70
6 | Canisius | 59
2 | Niagara | 64

Championship; Sunday, March 7
1 | Manhattan | 68
2 | Niagara | 67
