= Mitch Buonaguro =

American basketball player-coach

Current position
- Title: Consultant
- Team: Saint Rose
- Conference: Northeast-10 Conference

Biographical details
- Born: December 4, 1953 (age 72); Queens, New York, U.S.

Playing career
- 1971–1975: Boston College

Coaching career (HC unless noted)
- 1975–1977: Boston College (assistant)
- 1977–1985: Villanova (assistant)
- 1985–1991: Fairfield
- 1991–1996: Texas A&M (assistant)
- 1996–2003: Cleveland State (assistant)
- 2003–2005: UNC Greensboro (assistant)
- 2005–2010: Siena (assistant)
- 2010–2013: Siena
- 2015–2019: Fairfield (assistant)
- 2019–present: Saint Rose (consultant)

Head coaching record
- Overall: 107–162
- Tournaments: 0–2 (NCAA Division I)

Accomplishments and honors

Championships
- MAAC regular season (1986); 2 MAAC tournament (1986, 1987)

Awards
- MAAC Coach of the Year (1986)

Mitch Buonaguro (born December 4, 1953) is an American college basketball coach and current consultant at Saint Rose.

== Coaching career ==
Buonaguro was an assistant coach under Rollie Massimino for the national champion 1984–85 Villanova Wildcats men's basketball team.

Buonaguro was the head coach at Fairfield University from 1985 to 1991. During his first season, he coached the Stags to its first MAAC Championship, first berth in NCAA tournament where the Stags faced the Illinois Fighting Illini in the first round; and ended the year with a 24–7 record, the most wins in school history. As a result, his MAAC coaching peers recognized him as the 1985–86 MAAC Coach of the Year. The following season, Buonaguro coached Fairfield through an injury-plagued season to mount an improbable run to its second consecutive MAAC Championship and to earn its second consecutive bid to the NCAA tournament where the Stags faced the top-seeded and eventual national champion Indiana Hoosiers in the first round.

Buonaguro was named the 15th head coach in Siena history on April 8, 2010, after being the lead assistant coach at Siena the past five years for previous coach Fran McCaffery. After posting a 35–59 record in three seasons Buonaguro was dismissed from Siena on March 12, 2013.

In April 2015, Buonaguro re-joined Fairfield as an assistant. Buonaguro was led go from Fairfield in 2019 after head coach Sydney Johnson was fired. Buonaguro became a special consultant for Saint Rose's men's and women's basketball teams.

== Head coaching record ==
Record table
Season	Team	Overall	Conference	Standing	Postseason
Fairfield Stags (Metro Atlantic Athletic Conference) (1985–1991)
1985–86	Fairfield	24–7	13–1	1st	NCAA Division I first round
1986–87	Fairfield	15–16	5–9	7th	NCAA Division I first round
1987–88	Fairfield	8–20	4–10	7th	
1988–89	Fairfield	7–21	2–12	8th	
1989–90	Fairfield	10–19	6–10	5th (South)	
1990–91	Fairfield	8–20	4–12	8th	
Fairfield:		72–103 (.411)	34–54 (.386)		
Siena Saints (Metro Atlantic Athletic Conference) (2010–2013)
2010–11	Siena	13–18	8–10	7th	
2011–12	Siena	14–17	8–10	T–6th	
2012–13	Siena	8–24	4–14	9th	
Siena:		35–59 (.376)	20–34(.370)		
Total:		107–162 (.398)			
National champion Postseason invitational champion Conference regular season champion Conference regular season and conference tournament champion Division regular season champion Division regular season and conference tournament champion Conference tournament champion
