= 1984 MAAC men's basketball tournament =

- Classification: Division I
- Season: 1983–84
- Teams: 8
- First round site: New Haven Coliseum; New Haven, Connecticut
- Finals site: Meadowlands Arena; East Rutherford, New Jersey
- Champions: Iona (2nd title)
- Winning coach: Pat Kennedy (2nd title)
- MVP: Steve Burtt (Iona)

1983–84 MAAC men's basketball standings
	Conf.				Overall
Team	W		L	PCT	W		L	PCT
La Salle	11	–	3	.786	20	–	11	.645
Saint Peter's	11	–	3	.786	23	–	6	.793
Iona †	11	–	3	.786	23	–	8	.742
Fordham	7	–	7	.500	19	–	15	.559
Fairfield	5	–	9	.357	10	–	18	.357
Holy Cross	5	–	9	.357	12	–	18	.400
Army	4	–	10	.286	11	–	17	.393
Manhattan	2	–	12	.143	9	–	19	.321
† 1984 MAAC tournament winner Rankings from AP Poll

The 1984 MAAC men's basketball tournament was held March 8–10 with the quarterfinal round held at the New Haven Coliseum in New Haven, Connecticut and the semifinals and championship game held at the Meadowlands Arena in East Rutherford, New Jersey.

Iona defeated Fordham in the championship game, 72–61, to win their second MAAC men's basketball tournament in three years.

The Gaels received a bid to the 1984 NCAA tournament where they were beaten by Virginia in the opening round, 57–56.

== Format ==
All eight of the conference's members participated in the tournament field. They were seeded based on regular season conference records, with all teams starting play in the quarterfinal round. An additional third place game was also played on the last day of the tournament.

Quarterfinal games were played at the New Haven Coliseum in New Haven, Connecticut. All remaining games were played at a neutral site at the Meadowlands Arena in East Rutherford, New Jersey.

== Bracket ==
Quarterfinals; Friday, March 8
1	La Salle	76
8	Manhattan	60
4	Fordham	80
5	Fairfield	69
3	Iona	73
6	Holy Cross	66
2	Saint Peter's	69
7	Army	41

Semifinals; Saturday, March 9
1	La Salle	60
4	Fordham	62
3	Iona	59
2	St. Peter's	56

Championship; Sunday, March 10
4	Fordham	61
3	Iona	72
Third Place Sunday, March 10
1	La Salle	63
2	St. Peter's	65
