= Pat Kennedy (coach) =

American basketball player and coach

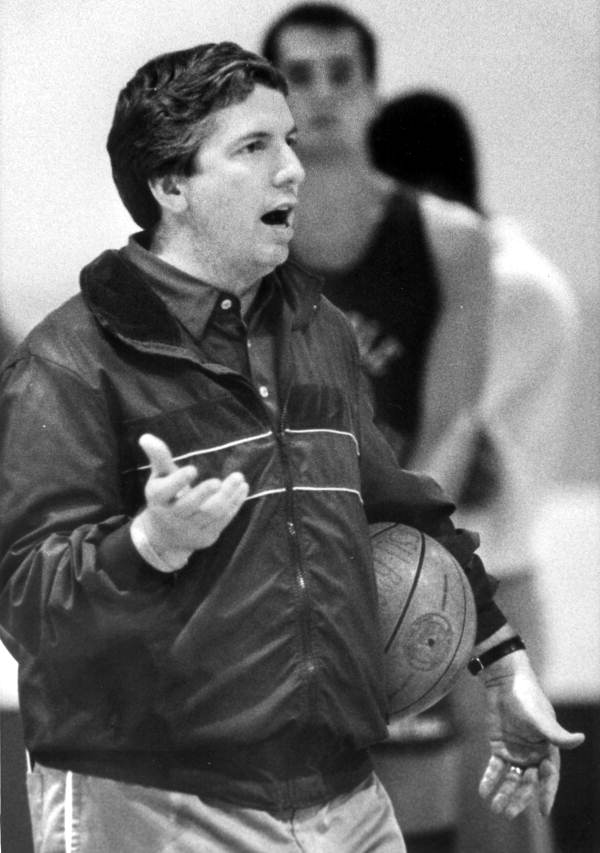
- Kennedy coaching Florida State in 1986

Biographical details
- Born: January 5, 1952 (age 74); Keyport, New Jersey, U.S.

Playing career
- 1971–1973: King's (PA)

Coaching career (HC unless noted)
- 1973–1975: King's (PA) (JV)
- 1975–1977: Lehigh (assistant)
- 1977–1980: Iona (assistant)
- 1980–1986: Iona
- 1986–1997: Florida State
- 1997–2002: DePaul
- 2002–2004: Montana
- 2004–2011: Towson
- 2013–2015: Pace

Head coaching record
- Overall: 499–497
- Tournaments: 6–8 (NCAA Division I); 7–5 (NIT)

Accomplishments and honors

Championships
- 3 MAAC tournament (1982, 1984, 1985); 3 MAAC regular season (1983–1985); Metro regular season (1989); Metro tournament (1991)

Awards
- MAAC Coach of the Year (1984); ACC Coach of the Year (1992)

Joseph Patrick Kennedy (born January 5, 1952) is an American former college basketball coach and player. He was previously the men's basketball coach at Towson University, Iona College, Florida State University, DePaul University, Pace University and the University of Montana. Currently, Kennedy is a senior advisor for the Hoop Group and Be The Beast Recruiting.

== Early life ==
Kennedy was born in Keyport, New Jersey and attended Red Bank Catholic High School in Red Bank, New Jersey. Kennedy's father Joseph William emigrated to the U.S. from Tralee, Ireland.

== Coaching career ==
Pat Kennedy graduated from King's College, Pennsylvania in 1975 with a B.A. in political science. He was a player for his first two years, then coached the junior varsity team for his last two years. In 1975, he became an assistant coach at Lehigh under Brian Hill. After three years at Lehigh, Kennedy joined Jim Valvano's staff at Iona in 1978. Valvano left for NC State in 1980, after which Kennedy was promoted to head coach. In six years, he led the Gaels to two NIT and two NCAA tournament appearances. He compiled a 124–60 record while at Iona. He was the NABC District Coach of the Year at Iona in 1984 and the MAAC Coach of the Year in 1985.

After Iona, Kennedy went to Florida State. Kennedy won both a Metro regular season title and the tournament championship (1991) before taking on the ACC schedule beginning with the 1991–92 season. He was named ACC Coach of the Year in 1992. Kennedy led the Seminoles to five NCAA Tournament berths and two NIT appearances in his 11 years at FSU. The Seminoles advanced to the Elite Eight of the 1993 NCAA tournament, which was the second-best season in FSU history. Florida State went 202–131 under Kennedy, posting a .607 winning percentage. In his first season coaching in the ACC, Kennedy set a then-record for road wins (6) and total ACC wins (11) by a first-year coach. Kennedy's teams featured some of the best players in FSU history. His 1992–93 team was one of the only teams in ACC history to include four NBA first round draft picks (Charlie Ward, Bob Sura, Sam Cassell and Doug Edwards). Seven of Kennedy's 11 FSU teams recorded 19 or more wins and he reached the 20-win plateau five times.

He replaced Joey Meyer as head coach at DePaul on June 12, 1997. The Blue Demons had won 3 games in Meyer's final season. In 2000, Kennedy led the Blue Demons to their first NCAA appearance in eight years. Kennedy was one of the youngest coaches to ever take three programs to the NCAA tournament. While in Chicago, Kennedy compiled the number one recruiting class in the country and took the team to the NIT and NCAA in his second and third season. DePaul was the first program to lose five underclassmen in a two-year period to the NBA in 2000 and 2001. He resigned on March 5, 2002 after a campaign in which the Blue Demons lost 15 of its last 17 games including its final six to finish 9–19 overall and 2–14 in league play and failed to qualify for the Conference USA Tournament. He was succeeded by Dave Leitao six weeks later on April 16.

In 2002, Kennedy was hired to coach Montana. While at Montana, Kennedy served as the President of the NABC (National Association of Basketball Coaches). His two-year record with the Grizzlies was 23–35 before he left to take the head coaching job at Towson University in 2004. After a 5–24 record in his first year, Towson improved to 12–16 in 2005–06 and 15–17 in 2006–07. Towson extended Kennedy's contract, originally set to end in 2008, through the 2010–11 season. After a 2010–11 season with a 4–23 record, Kennedy stepped down as Towson's head coach.

On May 7, 2013 Kennedy accepted the head coaching job at Pace, a Division II school who competes in the Northeast-10 Conference. During his second year at Pace, Kennedy won his 499th game against Stonehill College on January 10, 2015. Pace parted ways with Kennedy on March 2, 2015 after two seasons.

After 40 years as a college basketball coach, Kennedy coached 27 players who played in the NBA. These players include multiple first round draft picks like Jeff Ruland, George McCloud, Charlie Ward, Doug Edwards, Bob Sura, Sam Cassell, and Quentin Richardson.

== Awards and honors ==
– 2004–05 National Association Basketball Coaches (NABC) President

– 1992 ACC Coach of the Year

– 1985 MAAC Coach of the Year

– 1984 NABC District Coach of the Year

– Florida State University Hall of Fame

– MAAC Hall of Fame

– Iona College Hall of Fame

– Kings College Hall of Fame

– New Rochelle Hall of Fame

– Red Bank Catholic HS Hall of Fame

== Head coaching record ==
Record table
Season	Team	Overall	Conference	Standing	Postseason
Iona Gaels (Eastern Collegiate Athletic Conference Metro) (1980–1981)
1980–81	Iona	15–14	6–2		
Iona Gaels (Metro Atlantic Athletic Conference) (1981–1986)
1981–82	Iona	24–9	7–3	3rd	NIT first round
1982–83	Iona	22–9	8–2	1st	NIT second round
1983–84	Iona	23–8	11–3	T–1st	NCAA Division I first round
1984–85	Iona	26–5	11–3	1st	NCAA Division I first round
1985–86	Iona	14–15	9–5	2nd	
Iona:		124–60 (.674)	52–18 (.743)		
Florida State Seminoles (Metro Conference) (1986–1991)
1986–87	Florida State	19–11	6–6	T–3rd	NIT second round
1987–88	Florida State	19–11	7–5	2nd	NCAA Division I first round
1988–89	Florida State	22–8	9–3	1st	NCAA Division I first round
1989–90	Florida State	16–15	6–8	T–5th	
1990–91	Florida State	21–11	9–5	2nd	NCAA Division I second round
Florida State Seminoles (Atlantic Coast Conference) (1991–1997)
1991–92	Florida State	22–10	11–5	2nd	NCAA Division I Sweet 16
1992–93	Florida State	25–10	12–4	2nd	NCAA Division I Elite Eight
1993–94	Florida State	13–14	6–10	T–7th	
1994–95	Florida State	12–15	5–11	T–6th	
1995–96	Florida State	13–14	5–11	8th	
1996–97	Florida State	20–12	6–10	7th	NIT Runner-up
Florida State:		202–131 (.607)	82–78 (.513)		
DePaul Blue Demons (Conference USA) (1997–2002)
1997–98	DePaul	7–23	3–13	6th (American)	
1998–99	DePaul	18–13	10–6	T–3rd (American)	NIT second round
1999–00	DePaul	21–12	9–7	3rd (American)	NCAA Division I first round
2000–01	DePaul	12–18	4–12	6th (American)	
2001–02	DePaul	9–19	2–14	7th (American)	
DePaul:		67–85 (.441)	28–52 (.350)		
Montana Grizzlies (Big Sky Conference) (2002–2004)
2002–03	Montana	13–17	7–7	T–3rd	
2003–04	Montana	10–18	6–8	T–6th	
Montana:		23–35 (.397)	13–15 (.464)		
Towson Tigers (Colonial Athletic Association) (2004–2011)
2004–05	Towson	5–24	2–16	10th	
2005–06	Towson	12–16	8–10	T–7th	
2006–07	Towson	15–17	8–10	T–7th	
2007–08	Towson	13–18	7–11	9th	
2008–09	Towson	12–22	5–13	T–10th	
2009–10	Towson	10–21	5–13	8th	
2010–11	Towson	4–26	0–18	12th	
Towson:		71–144 (.330)	39–78 (.333)		
Pace Setters (Northeast-10 Conference) (2013–2015)
2013–14	Pace	7–19	5–15	6th (Southwest)	
2014–15	Pace	5–23	1–19	7th (Southwest)	
Pace:		12–42 (.222)	6–34 (.150)		
Total:		499–497 (.501)			
National champion Postseason invitational champion Conference regular season champion Conference regular season and conference tournament champion Division regular season champion Division regular season and conference tournament champion Conference tournament champion
