= 1997 MAAC men's basketball tournament =

- Classification: Division I
- Season: 1996–97
- Teams: 8
- First round site: Campus Sites; Campus Arenas
- Finals site: Marine Midland Arena; Buffalo, New York
- Champions: Fairfield (3rd title)
- Winning coach: Paul Cormier (1st title)
- MVP: Greg Francis (Fairfield)

1996–97 MAAC men's basketball standings
	Conf.				Overall
Team	W		L	PCT	W		L	PCT
Iona	11	–	3	.786	22	–	8	.733
Canisius	10	–	4	.714	17	–	12	.586
Loyola (MD)	10	–	4	.714	13	–	14	.481
Saint Peter's	9	–	5	.643	13	–	15	.464
Manhattan	5	–	9	.357	9	–	18	.333
Niagara	5	–	9	.357	11	–	17	.393
Siena	4	–	10	.286	9	–	18	.333
Fairfield †	2	–	12	.143	11	–	19	.367
† 1997 MAAC tournament winner

The 1997 MAAC men's basketball tournament was held March 1–3 at the Marine Midland Arena in Buffalo, New York.

Eighth-seeded Fairfield made a cinderella run to win the tournament by defeating Canisius in the championship game, 78–72, to win their third MAAC men's basketball tournament.

The Stags received the conference's automatic bid to the 1997 NCAA tournament as the No. 16 seed in the East region.

== Format ==
All eight of the conference's members participated in the tournament field. They were seeded based on regular season conference records.

All three rounds were played at a neutral site at the Marine Midland Arena in Buffalo, New York.

== Bracket ==
Quarterfinals; Saturday, March 1
1	Iona	71
8	Fairfield	80
4	Saint Peter's	51
5	Manhattan	48
3	Loyola (MD)	43
6	Niagara	53
2	Canisius	84
7	Siena	44

Semifinals; Sunday, March 2
8	Fairfield	73
4	St. Peter's	61
6	Niagara	59
2	Canisius	78

Championship; Monday, March 3
8	Fairfield	78
2	Canisius	72
