= 1996–97 Fairfield Stags men's basketball team =

American college basketball season

1996–97 Fairfield Stags men's basketball
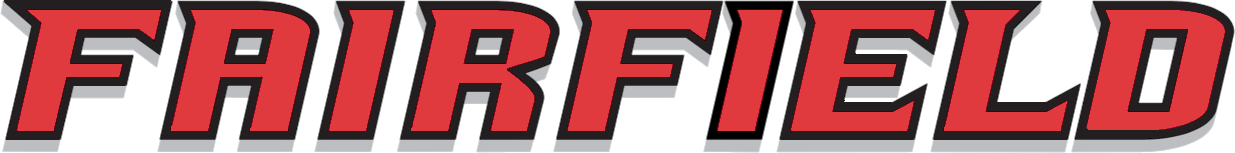

MAAC tournament champion

NCAA tournament
- Conference: Metro Atlantic Athletic Conference
- Record: 11–19 (2–12 MAAC)
- Head coach: Paul Cormier (6th season)
- Home arena: Alumni Hall

1996–97 MAAC men's basketball standings
	Conf.				Overall
Team	W		L	PCT	W		L	PCT
Iona	11	–	3	.786	22	–	8	.733
Canisius	10	–	4	.714	17	–	12	.586
Loyola (MD)	10	–	4	.714	13	–	14	.481
Saint Peter's	9	–	5	.643	13	–	15	.464
Manhattan	5	–	9	.357	9	–	18	.333
Niagara	5	–	9	.357	11	–	17	.393
Siena	4	–	10	.286	9	–	18	.333
Fairfield †	2	–	12	.143	11	–	19	.367
† 1997 MAAC tournament winner

The 1996–97 Fairfield Stags men's basketball team represented Fairfield University in the 1996–97 NCAA Division I men's basketball season. The Stags, led by sixth-year head coach Paul Cormier, played their home games at Alumni Hall in Fairfield, Connecticut as members of the Metro Atlantic Athletic Conference. They finished the season 11–19, 2–12 in MAAC play to finish in eighth place. In the MAAC tournament, they went on a surprising run to the title by defeating Iona, Saint Peter's, and Canisius to earn an automatic bid to the NCAA tournament as No. 16 seed in the East region. In the opening round, the Stags were beaten by No. 1 seed and eventual Final Four participant North Carolina in a competitive game, 82–74.

As of the 2021 NCAA Tournament, this Fairfield team is tied with FIU (1995) and UCF (1996) for worst record for an NCAA Tournament team at 11–18.

== Roster ==
1996–97 Fairfield Stags men's basketball team
Players	Coaches
Pos. / # / Name / Height / Weight / Year / Previous school / Hometown; G / / Greg Francis / 6 ft 3 in (1.91 m) / — / Sr / Toronto, Ontario	Head coach: Paul Cormier (Marist); Assistant coach(es) Legend: (C) Team captain; (S) Suspended; (I) Ineligible; (W) Walk-on; Injured; Current redshirt; Roster

== Schedule and results ==
Date time, TV	Rank^{#}	Opponent^{#}	Result	Record	Site (attendance) city, state
Regular season
Nov 23, 1996*		East Carolina	L 64–81	0–1	Alumni Hall; Fairfield, Connecticut
Nov 26, 1996*		at Colgate	W 82–77 ^{OT}	1–1	Cotterell Court; Hamilton, New York
Nov 30, 1996*		Central Michigan	W 82–63	2–1	Alumni Hall; Fairfield, Connecticut
Dec 3, 1996*		at Wagner	W 86–71	3–1	Sutter Gym; Staten Island, New York
Dec 6, 1996*		vs. Santa Clara	L 60–64	3–2	War Memorial Gymnasium; San Francisco, California
Dec 7, 1996*		at San Francisco	L 62–70	3–3	War Memorial Gymnasium; San Francisco, California
Dec 21, 1996*		at Connecticut	L 58–68	3–4	Harry A. Gampel Pavilion; Storrs, Connecticut
Dec 31, 1996*		at Southern Utah	W 78–51	4–4	Centrum; Cedar City, Utah
Jan 6, 1997		Canisius	L 60–75	4–5 (0–1)	Alumni Hall; Fairfield, Connecticut
Jan 8, 1997*		at Fordham	L 53–57	4–6	Rose Hill Gym; Bronx, New York
Jan 11, 1997*		Central Connecticut State	W 56–54	5–6	Alumni Hall; Fairfield, Connecticut
Jan 15, 1997*		No. 19 Boston College	L 79–81 ^{OT}	5–7	Alumni Hall; Fairfield, Connecticut
Jan 18, 1997		at Iona	L 70–81	5–8 (0–2)	Hynes Athletic Center; New Rochelle, New York
Jan 20, 1997		at Siena	L 58–66	5–9 (0–3)	Times Union Center; Loudonville, New York
Jan 24, 1997		Saint Peter's	L 52–58	5–10 (0–4)	Alumni Hall; Fairfield, Connecticut
Jan 26, 1997		Siena	W 74–64	6–10 (1–4)	Alumni Hall; Fairfield, Connecticut
Jan 29, 1997		at Manhattan	L 49–65	6–11 (1–5)	Draddy Gymnasium; New York, New York
Jan 31, 1997		Loyola (MD)	L 53–58	6–12 (1–6)	Alumni Hall; Fairfield, Connecticut
Feb 5, 1997		at Saint Peter's	L 58–71	6–13 (1–7)	Yanitelli Center; Jersey City, New Jersey
Feb 8, 1997		at Canisius	L 45–91	6–14 (1–8)	Koessler Athletic Center; Buffalo, New York
Feb 10, 1997		at Niagara	L 60–65	6–15 (1–9)	Gallagher Center; Lewiston, New York
Feb 12, 1997*		vs. Marist	W 84–75	7–15	McCann Arena; Poughkeepsie, New York
Feb 15, 1997		Manhattan	W 68–67	8–15 (2–9)	Alumni Hall; Fairfield, Connecticut
Feb 18, 1997		Iona	L 64–74	8–16 (2–10)	Alumni Hall; Fairfield, Connecticut
Feb 21, 1997		Niagara	L 72–75	8–17 (2–11)	Alumni Hall; Fairfield, Connecticut
Feb 23, 1997		at Loyola (MD)	L 59–67	8–18 (2–12)	Reitz Arena; Baltimore, Maryland
MAAC Tournament
Mar 1, 1997*		vs. Iona; Quarterfinals	W 80–71	9–18	Marine Midland Arena; Buffalo, New York
Mar 2, 1997*		vs. Saint Peter's; Semifinals	W 73–61	10–18	Marine Midland Arena; Buffalo, New York
Mar 3, 1997*		at Canisius; Championship game	W 78–72	11–18	Marine Midland Arena; Buffalo, New York
NCAA Tournament
Mar 13, 1997*	(16 E)	vs. (1 E) No. 4 North Carolina; First round	L 74–82	11–19	Lawrence Joel Coliseum; Winston-Salem, North Carolina
*Non-conference game. ^{#}Rankings from AP Poll. (#) Tournament seedings in parentheses. All times are in Eastern.
