= Total Mortgage Arena =

Multi-purpose arena in Bridgeport, Connecticut, U.S.

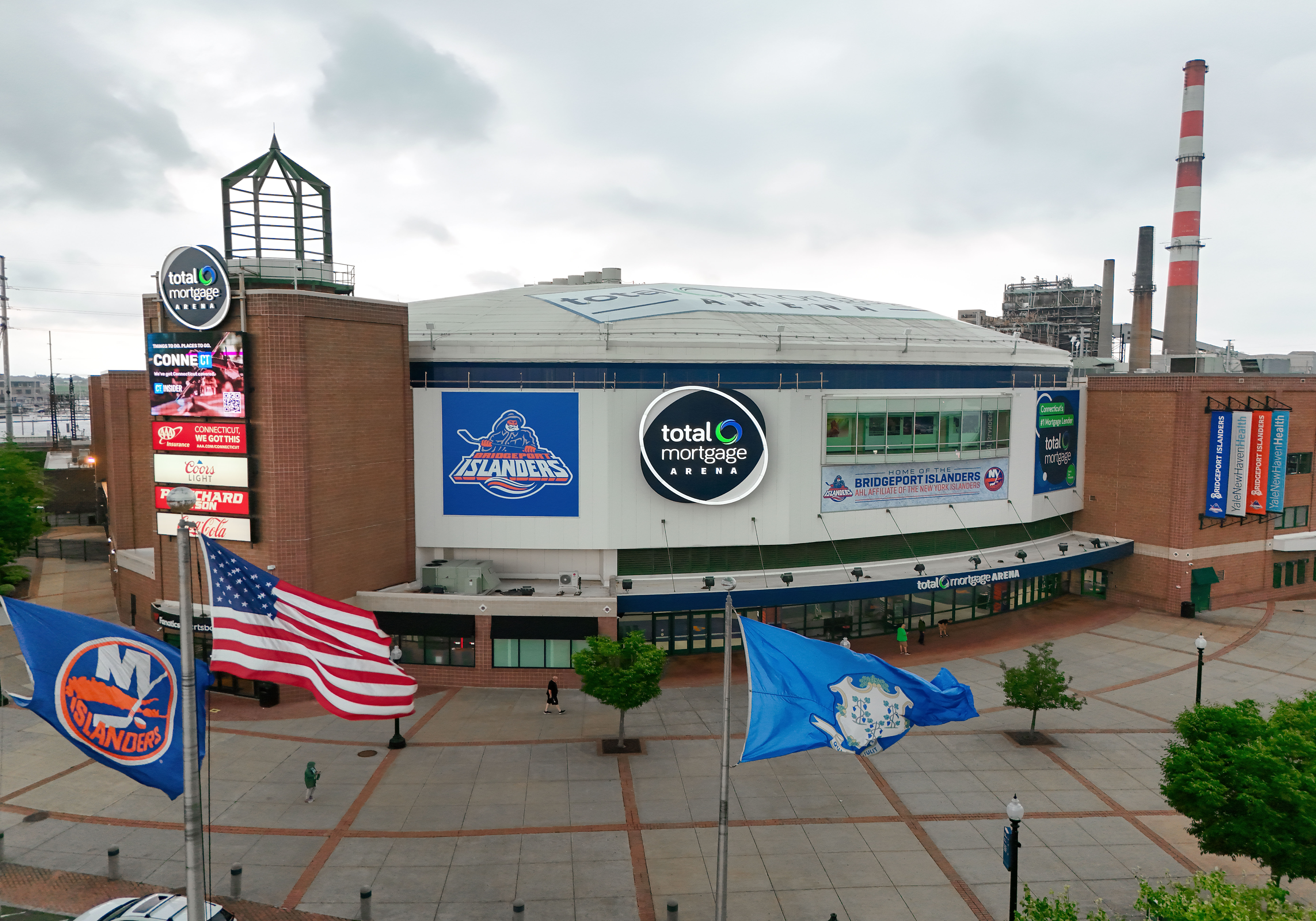
- The exterior in 2024

- Location within Connecticut Location within the United States
- Interactive map of Total Mortgage Arena
- Full name: Total Mortgage Arena
- Former names: Arena at Harbor Yard (2001–2011); Webster Bank Arena (2011–2022)
- Address: 600 Main Street
- Location: Bridgeport, Connecticut, U.S.
- Coordinates: 41.17320°N 73.1870°W
- Owner: City of Bridgeport
- Operator: Oak View Group
- Capacity: Concerts: 10,000; Basketball: up to 9,000; Ice hockey: 8,412
- Surface: Multi-surface
- Public transit: Bridgeport

Construction
- Groundbreaking: October 19, 1999
- Opened: October 10, 2001
- Cost: $56,278,684 ($102 million in 2025 dollars)
- Architects: BBB Architects, Ltd. Kasper Group Inc.
- Structural engineers: BVH Integrated Services, Inc.
- General contractors: CR Klewin, Inc.

Tenants
- Bridgeport Sound Tigers/Islanders (AHL) (2001–2026); New York Sirens (PWHL) (2024); Fairfield Stags (NCAA); Men's basketball (2001–2022); Men's ice hockey (2001–2003); Sacred Heart Pioneers (NCAA) (2016–2022); Westchester Knicks (NBAGL) (2021–2023); Elite Golden Knights (EHL) (2026–present)

Website
- totalmortgagearena.com

Total Mortgage Arena (formerly The Arena at Harbor Yard and Webster Bank Arena) is a 10,000-seat multi-purpose arena in downtown Bridgeport, Connecticut, United States. It was the home venue of the Bridgeport Islanders of the American Hockey League (AHL) from 2001 to 2026. Managed by the Oak View Group, the arena was built alongside the Hartford HealthCare Amphitheater and opened on October 10, 2001. Webster Bank entered into a 10-year $3.5 million agreement on January 6, 2011, with the City of Bridgeport for the arena naming rights. When this agreement ended, the City entered into a new one on March 8, 2022, that granted the naming rights to Total Mortgage of Milford, Connecticut.

The arena houses 33 executive suites, 1,300 club seats, 3 hospitality suites and a Sony Jumbotron serving as a scoreboard. The arena offers luxury boxes to corporate sponsors.

Since 2008, the Fairfield University men's and women's basketball teams play select games at the arena. Starting in 2013, the arena hosted regular season Connecticut Huskies men's and women's basketball games. The UConn men's hockey team, a new member of Hockey East, were also scheduled to play five regular season games in Bridgeport during the 2014–15 season.

== College sports ==
=== Fairfield Stags basketball ===
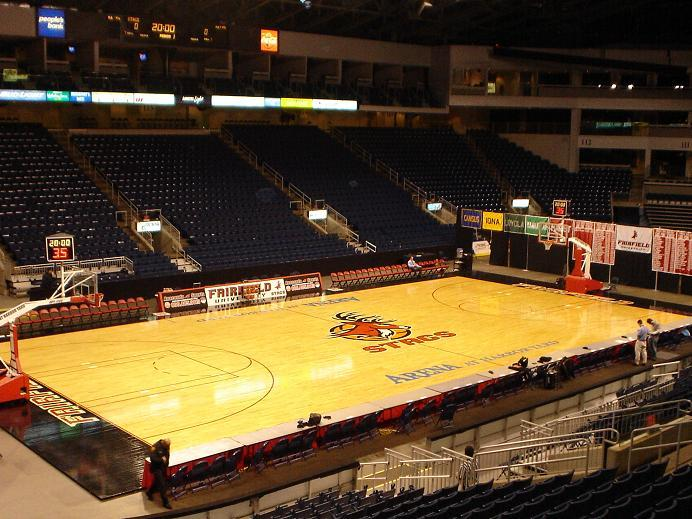
Fairfield Stags basketball setup

Total Mortgage Arena was home to the Fairfield Stags men's and women's college basketball teams until Fairfield University opened the on-campus Leo D. Mahoney Arena in November 2022. Fairfield is a member of the Metro Atlantic Athletic Conference (MAAC) where the Stags annually compete against perennial MAAC powers including the Iona Gaels, the 1995 and 2004 NCAA Tournament Cinderella Manhattan Jaspers, the Niagara Purple Eagles, and the 2008 and 2009 NCAA Tournament Cinderella Siena Saints. The arena was the site of the men's two postseason appearances in the National Invitation Tournament. During the first round of the 2003 National Invitation Tournament, the Stags, led by the nation's blocked shots leader Deng Gai and Nick Delfico played the Boston College Eagles featuring future NBA players Troy Bell and Craig Smith. During the second round of the 2011 National Invitation Tournament, the Stags, led by head coach Ed Cooley and Derek Needham played the Kent State Golden Flashes. In recent years, Fairfield has brought several perennial national college basketball powers to the arena including the Georgetown Hoyas, Providence Friars and St. Joseph's Hawks.

=== Connecticut 6 Classic ===
The Arena at Harbor Yard hosted the inaugural Connecticut 6 Classic, a men's college basketball tripleheader featuring Connecticut's six mid-major teams, on November 13, 2009. The Sacred Heart Pioneers defeated the Yale Bulldogs 92–86 in the tip-off game of the night. The Fairfield Stags defeated the Central Connecticut Blue Devils 67–58 in game two, and the night concluded with the Quinnipiac Bobcats defeating the Hartford Hawks 85–74.

=== MAAC basketball tournaments ===
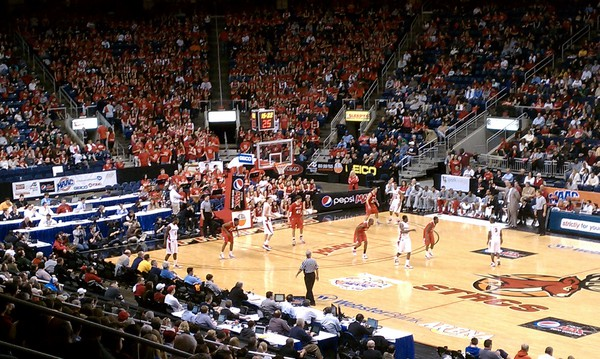
2011 MAAC tournament

The arena and Fairfield University along with the City of Bridgeport and the Fairfield County Sports Commission have hosted the MAAC Men's and Women's Basketball Championships two times. The MAAC Men's and Women's Basketball Championships features all 20 of the league's teams competing for an automatic berth in the NCAA Men's Division I Basketball Championship and the NCAA Women's Division I Basketball Championship. In 2007, the Niagara Purple Eagles defeated the Siena Saints to win the 2007 MAAC Men's Basketball Championships and the Marist Red Foxes defeated the Iona Gaels to win the 2007 MAAC Women's Basketball Championship. And in 2011, the St. Peter's Peacocks defeated the Iona Gaels to win the 2011 MAAC Men's Basketball Championships and the Marist Red Foxes defeated the Loyola Greyhounds to win the 2011 MAAC Women's Basketball Championship.

=== NCAA basketball tournaments ===
The arena and Fairfield University along with the City of Bridgeport and the Fairfield County Sports Commission have brought the First and Second Rounds of NCAA Women's Division I Basketball Championship to the arena three times since 2004. The 2004 tournament featured the Auburn Tigers, Connecticut Huskies, Penn Quakers, and North Carolina State Wolfpack. The Connecticut Huskies defeated the Auburn Tigers to win the 2004 Bridgeport Regional en route to winning the 2004 tournament and being crowned National Champions. The 2006 tournament featured the Connecticut Huskies, Duke Blue Devils, Georgia Bulldogs, and Michigan State Spartans. The Duke Blue Devils defeated the Connecticut Huskies to win the 2006 Bridgeport Regional before advancing to the Final Four of the 2006 tournament. And the 2008 tournament featured the Connecticut Huskies, Cornell Big Red, Minnesota Gophers, and Texas Longhorns. The Connecticut Huskies defeated the Texas Longhorns to win the 2008 Bridgeport Regional before advancing to the Final Four of the 2008 tournament. The arena was the site of the Bridgeport Subregional during the 2012 tournament and the Bridgeport Regional for the 2013 tournament, 2016 tournament, and 2017 tournament, and the 2022 tournament.

=== NCAA hockey tournaments ===
The arena has joined Fairfield University and Yale University in co-hosting the East Regional of the NCAA Men's Ice Hockey Championship three times. The 2009 NCAA Division I Men's Ice Hockey Tournament featured the Air Force Falcons, Michigan Wolverines, Vermont Catamounts, and Yale Bulldogs. The Vermont Catamounts won a dramatic double overtime game against the Air Force Falcons to win the East Regional and advance to the 2009 Frozen Four. The 2011 NCAA Division I Men's Ice Hockey Tournament featured the Air Force Falcons, Minnesota-Duluth Bulldogs, Union Dutchmen, and Yale Bulldogs. The eventual 2011 National Champion Minnesota-Duluth Bulldogs upset the top seeded Yale Bulldogs to win the East Regional and advance to the 2011 Frozen Four. In 2012, the Union Dutchmen defeated UMass Lowell Riverhawks to advance to the Frozen Four. The arena hosted again in 2014. Most recently, in 2018, the top-seeded Notre Dame Fighting Irish beat the second-seeded Providence Friars to win the East Regional; the Michigan Tech Huskies and Clarkson Golden Knights also participated. The arena would again host the East Regional in 2023 on March 24 and 26, which would feature the eventual 2023 NCAA champion Quinnipiac Bobcats, Ohio State Buckeyes, Harvard Crimson, and Merrimack Warriors.

=== Sacred Heart Pioneers men's ice hockey ===
The arena served as the home venue for the Sacred Heart University men's ice hockey team from 2016 to 2022. Prior to the 2016–17 season, the Pioneers had hosted select games each year at the Arena since the 2010–11 season. During the 2019–20 season, the Pioneers were the hosts of the inaugural Connecticut Ice college hockey tournament, an in-season weekend tournament played at the Arena featuring matchups between the four NCAA Division 1 Men's Ice Hockey programs in the State of Connecticut: the UConn Huskies men's ice hockey team, the Quinnipiac Bobcats men's ice hockey team, the Sacred Heart Pioneers men's ice hockey team, and the Yale Bulldogs men's ice hockey team. Sacred Heart would go on to win the championship game over Quinnipiac by a score of 4–1. The Pioneers relocated to Martire Family Arena at the Sacred Heart University West Campus in Fairfield, CT starting with the 2022–23 season.

=== Park City SportsFest ===
In conjunction with Webster Bank Arena hosting the MAAC and NCAA basketball and hockey tournaments, the Park City SportsFest has become an annual tradition in downtown Bridgeport. SportsFest is a free, multi-venue fan festival. During SportsFest, the City of Bridgeport closes off a portion of Main Street from its intersection with State Street to the arena in order to house the events. The SportsFest is organized by the Fairfield County Sports Commission and presented by People's United Bank.

== Professional sports ==
=== Bridgeport Sound Tigers/Islanders ===
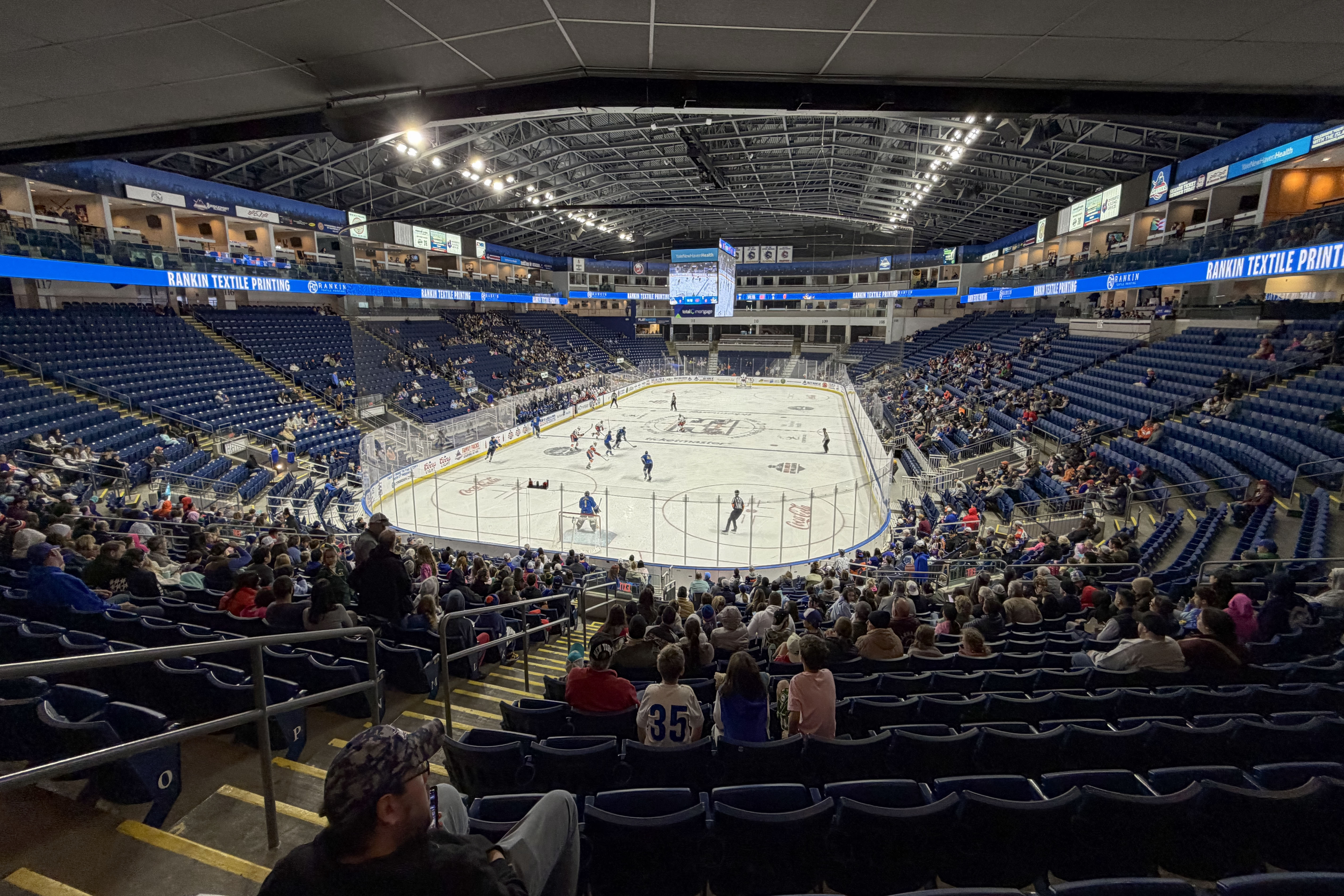
Interior during a hockey game

Total Mortgage Arena was home to the Bridgeport Islanders from 2001 to 2026, a professional ice hockey team in the American Hockey League (AHL) and the affiliate of the New York Islanders of the National Hockey League (NHL). The team was known as the Bridgeport Sound Tigers from 2001 to 2021. The Sound Tigers joined the AHL in 2001 and the first event at the arena was a Sound Tigers game on October 10, 2001. During their inaugural season, the Sound Tigers won a division championship and made the Calder Cup Finals where they lost to the Chicago Wolves four games to one.

=== New York Sirens ===
On November 28, 2023, it was announced that Total Mortgage Arena would host the New York Sirens, then named PWHL New York, for their inaugural season. New York's first home game took place on January 5, 2024—Toronto defeated New York by a score of 3–2. Starting in the second season, the Sirens would play at the Prudential Center instead.

=== NHL preseason hockey ===
On September 30, 2006, the Arena at Harbor Yard hosted an National Hockey League (NHL) preseason game between the New Jersey Devils and the New York Islanders. The Islanders defeated the Devils, 3–0. And on October 1, 2011, the Arena at Harbor Yard hosted an NHL preseason game between the 2011 Stanley Cup Champions Boston Bruins and the New York Islanders, where the Bruins defeated the Islanders 3–2. On October 3, 2014, the Boston Bruins and the New York Islanders played an preseason game at Webster Bank Arena. On October 1, 2016, the arena host another Islanders preseason game against the Washington Capitals. On September 22, 2017, the Islanders hosted the Rangers in a preseason game.

Webster Bank Arena served as the pre-season home for the Islanders for the 2021–22 season, as the team awaited the completion of their new permanent home, UBS Arena, in Elmont, New York, which opened on November 20, 2021.

Date	Teams	Attendance
September 30, 2006	New Jersey Devils 0–3 New York Islanders	—
October 1, 2011	Boston Bruins 3–2 New York Islanders	8,489
October 3, 2014	Boston Bruins 6–1 New York Islanders	8,600
October 1, 2016	Washington Capitals 2–1 New York Islanders	—
September 22, 2017	New York Rangers 1–2 New York Islanders	8,612
September 22, 2018	New York Rangers 2–5 New York Islanders	7,033
September 28, 2019	New York Rangers 2–4 New York Islanders	6,971
October 3, 2021	New Jersey Devils 2-1 (OT) New York Islanders	-
October 5, 2021	Philadelphia Flyers 0-3 New York Islanders	-
October 9, 2021	New York Rangers 5-4 (OT) New York Islanders	-

=== NBA preseason basketball ===
On October 18, 2003, the Arena at Harbor Yard hosted an National Basketball Association (NBA) preseason game between the New Jersey Nets and Toronto Raptors. The Nets defeated the Raptors 93–77. On October 15, 2005, the Arena at Harbor Yard also hosted a preseason game between the New Jersey Nets and New York Knicks. The Knicks defeated the Nets 93–84 in the contest.

Date	Teams	Attendance
October 18, 2003	Toronto Raptors 77–93 New Jersey Nets	8,170
October 15, 2005	New York Knicks 93–84 New Jersey Nets	8,825

=== International basketball ===
Date	Teams	Attendance
September 7, 2018	Japan 69–76 Canada	0
September 8, 2018	Canada 68–74 United States	3,258

=== Westchester Knicks ===
After it was announced that their arena, the Westchester County Center, would be unable to host them for the 2021-22 NBA G League season for it being a temporary makeshift COVID-19 hospital, Webster Bank Arena served as the home of the Westchester Knicks, a professional basketball team in the NBA G League and the affiliate of the New York Knicks of the National Basketball Association (NBA). On June 21, 2022, the Westchester Knicks announced that their home games would continue at the Total Mortgage Arena for the 2022–23 season.

== Special events ==
=== Gymnastics ===
On November 12, 2016, the arena hosted the Kellogg's Tour of Gymnastics Champions.

=== Mixed Martial Arts ===
On August 24, 2019, Bellator 225 was hosted at Webster Bank with the headliner being Mitrione vs. Kharitonov 2.

=== President Obama Rally ===
On October 30, 2010, the President of the United States Barack Obama joined Democratic Party candidates, including former Stamford Mayor and candidate for Governor Dan Malloy, Attorney General Richard Blumenthal and Congressman Jim Himes at a "Moving America Forward Rally" at the Arena at Harbor Yard.

=== Professional Wrestling ===
The 15th Anniversary of Monday Night Raw special took place from formerly known The Arena at Harbor Yard on December 10, 2007.

On June 1, 2019, NXT TakeOver: XXV took place from now formerly known Webster Bank Arena.

On February 23, 2022, All Elite Wrestling made its Connecticut debut and took place from now formerly known Webster Bank Arena.

On December 9, 2023, WWE held NXT Deadline

== See also ==
- List of NCAA Division I basketball arenas
