= Paul Cormier (basketball) =

American basketball player and coach

Biographical details
- Born: June 3, 1951 (age 75); Lexington, Massachusetts, U.S.

Playing career
- 1970–1973: New Hampshire

Coaching career (HC unless noted)
- 1978–1980: Bentley (assistant)
- 1980–1984: Villanova (assistant)
- 1984–1991: Dartmouth
- 1991–1998: Fairfield
- 2004–2006: Boston Celtics (assistant)
- 2010–2016: Dartmouth

Head coaching record
- Overall: 228–322 (.415)
- Tournaments: 0–1 (NCAA Division I); 0–1 (NIT); 0–1 (CIT)

Accomplishments and honors

Championships
- MAAC tournament (1997)

Awards
- MAAC Coach of the Year (1996)

Paul Cormier (born June 3, 1951) is currently the Chief of Staff for UMass men's basketball. He is the former head men's basketball coach at Dartmouth College. Recently, Cormier was an advance pro scout for the Golden State Warriors during the 2009–10 season and New Jersey Nets during the 2007–08 and 2008–09 NBA seasons. Previously, he was an assistant coach for the Memphis Grizzlies during the 2006–07 NBA season. He spent three seasons as an assistant coach for the Boston Celtics (2002–06) following two seasons as the head scout for Boston. Prior to joining the Celtics, Cormier spent the 1998–99 season as video scout for the New York Knicks.

Cormier coached at the collegiate level for twenty years. He served seven seasons (1991–98) as head coach of Fairfield University. During the 1995–96 season, Cormier coached Fairfield to a 20–10 overall record, an appearance in the Metro Atlantic Athletic Conference (MAAC) championship game and the program's fourth berth in the NIT. His MAAC coaching peers recognized him as the 1995–96 MAAC Coach of the Year. And during the 1996–97 season, Cormier coached Fairfield to the MAAC Championship and an automatic berth in the NCAA tournament. He then coached the #16 seed Fairfield to an early second half lead and near historic upset of the Dean Smith coached #1 seed North Carolina.

Cormier also served seven seasons (1984–91) as head coach at Dartmouth College and an additional six seasons (2010–2016); as an assistant coach at Villanova University (1980–84) and at Bentley College (1978–80).

Cormier is a graduate of the University of New Hampshire. He and his wife, Susan, have four sons.

== Head coaching record ==
Record table
Season	Team	Overall	Conference	Standing	Postseason
Dartmouth Big Green (Ivy League) (1984–1991)
1984–85	Dartmouth	5–21	3–11	8th	
1985–86	Dartmouth	11–15	6–8	6th	
1986–87	Dartmouth	15–11	7–7	4th	
1987–88	Dartmouth	18–8	10–4	2nd	
1988–89	Dartmouth	17–9	10–4	2nd	
1989–90	Dartmouth	12–14	7–7	3rd	
1990–91	Dartmouth	9–17	4–10	8th	
Fairfield Stags (Metro Atlantic Athletic Conference) (1991–1998)
1991–92	Fairfield	8–20	4–12	7th	
1992–93	Fairfield	14–13	7–7	5th	
1993–94	Fairfield	8–19	4–10	6th	
1994–95	Fairfield	13–15	6–8	4th	
1995–96	Fairfield	20–10	10–4	2nd	NIT First Round
1996–97	Fairfield	11–19	2–12	8th	NCAA Division I First Round
1997–98	Fairfield	12–15	7–11	9th	
Fairfield:		86–111 (.437)	40–64 (.385)		
Dartmouth Big Green (Ivy League) (2010–2016)
2010–11	Dartmouth	5–23	1–13	8th	
2011–12	Dartmouth	5–25	1–13	8th	
2012–13	Dartmouth	9–19	5–9	6th	
2013–14	Dartmouth	12–16	5–9	6th	
2014–15	Dartmouth	14–15	7–7	4th	CIT First Round
2015–16	Dartmouth	10–18	4–10	6th	
Dartmouth:		142–211 (.402)	70–112 (.385)		
Total:		228–322 (.415)			
National champion Postseason invitational champion Conference regular season champion Conference regular season and conference tournament champion Division regular season champion Division regular season and conference tournament champion Conference tournament champion
