= 1986–87 Fairfield Stags men's basketball team =

American college basketball season

1986–87 Fairfield Stags men's basketball
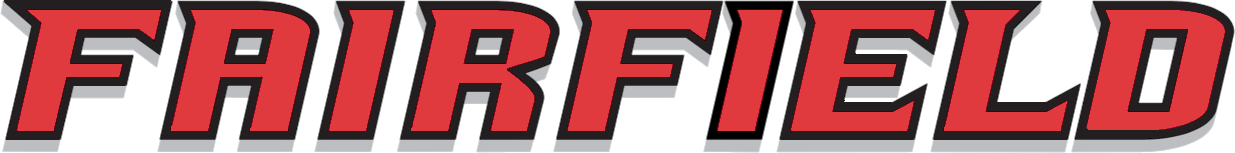

MAAC tournament champion

NCAA tournament, first round
- Conference: Metro Atlantic Athletic Conference
- Record: 15–16 (5–9 MAAC)
- Head coach: Mitch Buonaguro (2nd season)
- Home arena: Alumni Hall

1986–87 MAAC men's basketball standings
	Conf.				Overall
Team	W		L	PCT	W		L	PCT
Saint Peter's	11	–	3	.786	21	–	8	.724
La Salle	10	–	4	.714	20	–	13	.606
Army	8	–	6	.571	14	–	15	.483
Iona	8	–	6	.571	16	–	14	.533
Holy Cross	6	–	8	.429	9	–	19	.321
Fordham	6	–	8	.429	14	–	16	.467
Fairfield †	5	–	9	.357	15	–	16	.484
Manhattan	2	–	12	.143	6	–	21	.222
† 1987 MAAC tournament winner Rankings from AP Poll

The 1986–87 Fairfield Stags men's basketball team represented Fairfield University in the 1986–87 NCAA Division I men's basketball season. The Stags, led by second year head coach Mitch Buonaguro, played their home games at Alumni Hall in Fairfield, Connecticut as members of the Metro Atlantic Athletic Conference. They finished the season 15–16, 5–9 in MAAC play to 7th during the conference regular season. The Stags elevated their play to win the MAAC tournament and earn the conference's automatic bid to the NCAA tournament as No. 16 seed in the Midwest region. Making their second straight appearance in the NCAA Tournament, the Stags were beaten by No. 1 seed and eventual National champion Indiana, 92–58, in the opening round.

== Roster ==
1986–87 Fairfield Stags men's basketball team
Players
Coaches

Pos.	#	Name	Height	Weight	Year	Previous school	Hometown
C		Jeff Gromos	6 ft 8 in (2.03 m)	—	Sr
G		A. J. Wynder	6 ft 2 in (1.88 m)	—	RS Sr	UMass	The Bronx, New York

Head coach

- Mitch Buonaguro (Boston College)

Assistant coach(es)

Legend

- (C) Team captain
- (S) Suspended
- (I) Ineligible
- (W) Walk-on
- Injured
- Current redshirt

Roster

== Schedule and results ==
Date time, TV	Rank^{#}	Opponent^{#}	Result	Record	Site (attendance) city, state
Regular season
Nov 29, 1986*		Stonehill	W 62–60	1–0	Alumni Hall; Fairfield, Connecticut
Dec 2, 1986*		Hartford	L 50–52	1–1	Alumni Hall; Fairfield, Connecticut
Dec 6, 1986*		vs. Boston College	L 62–66	1–2	
Dec 8, 1986*		Siena	W 58–57	2–2	Alumni Hall; Fairfield, Connecticut
Dec 10, 1986*		at Marist	W 60–54 ^{OT}	3–2	McCann Recreation Center (2,100); Poughkeepsie, New York
Dec 20, 1986*		at No. 9 Syracuse	L 74–93	3–3	Carrier Dome; Syracuse, New York
Dec 23, 1986*		at Connecticut	L 51–54	3–4	Hartford Civic Center; Storrs, Connecticut
Dec 30, 1986*		New Hampshire	W 63–60	4–4	Alumni Hall; Fairfield, Connecticut
Jan 3, 1987*		at Hofstra	L 65–66	4–5	Hofstra Physical Fitness Center; Hempstead, New York
Jan 6, 1987*		vs. Richmond	L 87–91 ^{3OT}	4–6	
Jan 7, 1987		La Salle	W 63–60	5–6 (1–0)	Alumni Hall; Fairfield, Connecticut
Jan 8, 1987*		Lehigh	W 64–63	6–6	Alumni Hall; Fairfield, Connecticut
Jan 10, 1987		Fordham	L 70–74	6–7 (1–1)	Alumni Hall; Fairfield, Connecticut
Jan 13, 1987		Saint Peter's	L 57–72	6–8 (1–2)	Alumni Hall; Fairfield, Connecticut
Jan 21, 1987		Manhattan	L 78–80 ^{OT}	6–9 (1–3)	Alumni Hall; Fairfield, Connecticut
Jan 24, 1987		Iona	L 64–68	6–10 (1–4)	Alumni Hall; Fairfield, Connecticut
Jan 27, 1987*		Yale	W 86–81 ^{OT}	7–10	Alumni Hall; Fairfield, Connecticut
Jan 31, 1987		at Army	W 74–63	8–10 (2–4)	Christl Arena; West Point, New York
Feb 3, 1987		at Holy Cross	W 66–54	9–10 (3–4)	Hart Center; Worcester, Massachusetts
Feb 5, 1987*		Central Connecticut State	W 73–58	10–10	Alumni Hall; Fairfield, Connecticut
Feb 7, 1987		at Fordham	L 70–74	10–11 (3–5)	Rose Hill Gymnasium; Bronx, New York
Feb 11, 1987		at Manhattan	W 79–67	11–11 (4–5)	Draddy Gymnasium; Bronx, New York
Feb 13, 1987		at La Salle	L 54–58	11–12 (4–6)	Palestra; Philadelphia, Pennsylvania
Feb 16, 1987		vs. Saint Peter's	L 52–57	11–13 (4–7)	Yanitelli Center; Jersey City, New Jersey
Feb 18, 1987		Army	L 48–54	11–14 (4–8)	Alumni Hall; Fairfield, Connecticut
Feb 21, 1987		at Iona	L 83–85 ^{OT}	11–15 (4–9)	Hynes Athletics Center; New Rochelle, New York
Feb 26, 1987		Holy Cross	W 56–55	12–15 (5–9)	Alumni Hall; Fairfield, Connecticut
MAAC Tournament
Feb 28, 1987*		vs. La Salle; Quarterfinals	W 75–62	13–15	Brendan Byrne Arena; East Rutherford, New Jersey
Mar 1, 1987*		vs. Army; Semifinals	W 65–60	14–15	Brendan Byrne Arena; East Rutherford, New Jersey
Mar 2, 1987*		vs. Iona; Championship game	W 73–70 ^{OT}	15–15	Brendan Byrne Arena; East Rutherford, New Jersey
NCAA Tournament
Mar 12, 1987*	(16 MW)	vs. (1 MW) No. 3 Indiana; First Round	L 58–92	15–16	RCA Dome; Indianapolis, Indiana
*Non-conference game. ^{#}Rankings from AP Poll. (#) Tournament seedings in parentheses. MW=Midwest. All times are in Eastern.
