= 1983–84 Iona Gaels men's basketball team =

American college basketball season

1983–84 Iona Gaels men's basketball
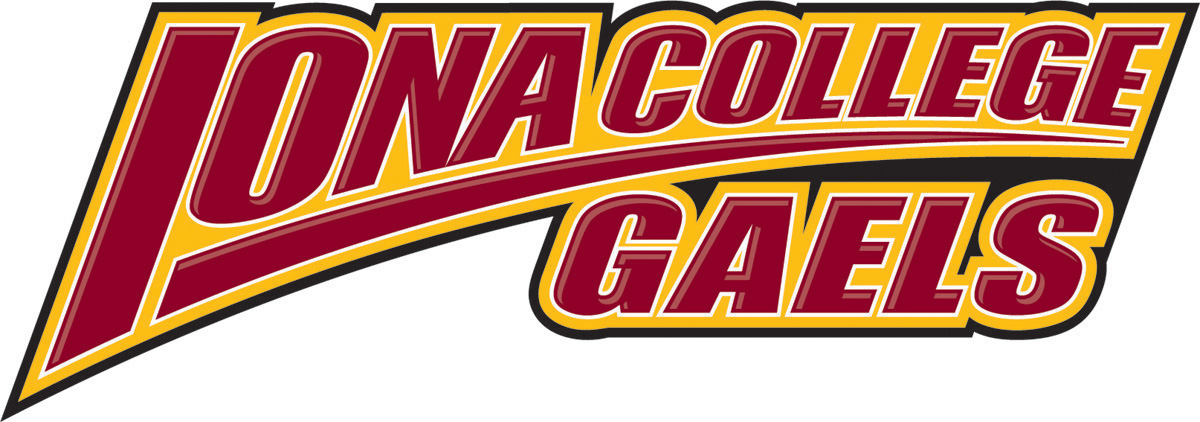

MAAC tournament champions

NCAA tournament, First Round
- Conference: Metro Atlantic Athletic Conference
- Record: 23–11 (11–3 MAAC)
- Head coach: Pat Kennedy (4th season)
- Home arena: Hynes Athletic Center

1983–84 MAAC men's basketball standings
	Conf.				Overall
Team	W		L	PCT	W		L	PCT
La Salle	11	–	3	.786	20	–	11	.645
Saint Peter's	11	–	3	.786	23	–	6	.793
Iona †	11	–	3	.786	23	–	8	.742
Fordham	7	–	7	.500	19	–	15	.559
Fairfield	5	–	9	.357	10	–	18	.357
Holy Cross	5	–	9	.357	12	–	18	.400
Army	4	–	10	.286	11	–	17	.393
Manhattan	2	–	12	.143	9	–	19	.321
† 1984 MAAC tournament winner Rankings from AP Poll

The 1983–84 Iona Gaels men's basketball team represented Iona College during the 1983–84 NCAA Division I men's basketball season. The Gaels, led fourth-year by head coach Pat Kennedy, played their home games at the Hynes Athletic Center and were members of the Metro Atlantic Athletic Conference. The Gaals finished in a three-way tie atop the MAAC regular season standings, and would go on to win the MAAC Basketball tournament to receive an automatic bid to the 1984 NCAA tournament. As the No. 10 seed in the East region, the Gaels lost to No. 7 seed and eventual Final Four participant Virginia in the opening round.

== Roster ==
1983–84 Iona Gaels men's basketball team
Players	Coaches
Pos. / # / Name / Height / Weight / Year / Hometown; G / 15 / Steve Burtt / 6 ft 2 in (1.88 m) / 175 lb (79 kg) / Sr / New York, New York	Head coach: Pat Kennedy; Assistant coach(es) Legend: (C) Team captain; (S) Suspended; (I) Ineligible; (W) Walk-on; Injured; Current redshirt; Roster

== Schedule and results ==
Date time, TV	Rank^{#}	Opponent^{#}	Result	Record	Site (attendance) city, state
Regular season
Nov 28, 1983*		Morgan State	W 92–46	1–0	Hynes Athletic Center; New Rochelle, New York
Dec 3, 1983*		vs. Robert Morris; Carrier Classic	W 86–65	2–0	Carrier Dome; Syracuse, New York
Dec 4, 1983*		at Syracuse; Carrier Classic	L 92–109	2–1	Carrier Dome; Syracuse, New York
Dec 7, 1983*		Detroit	W 91–81	3–1	Hynes Athletic Center; New Rochelle, New York
Dec 9, 1983*		Brown; Iona Classic	W 72–59	4–1	Hynes Athletic Center; New Rochelle, New York
Dec 10, 1983*		Illinois-Chicago; Iona Classic	W 86–65	5–1	Hynes Athletic Center; New Rochelle, New York
Dec 13, 1983*		at Marist	W 74–59	6–1	McCann Recreation Center; Poughkeepsie, New York
Dec 23, 1983*		Fairleigh Dickinson	L 73–74	6–2	Hynes Athletic Center; New Rochelle, New York
Dec 27, 1983*		vs. No. 1 North Carolina; ECAC Holiday Festival	L 61–74	6–3	Madison Square Garden; New York, New York
Dec 28, 1983*		at Fordham; ECAC Holiday Festival	W 66–60	7–3	Madison Square Garden; New York, New York
Jan 5, 1984*		vs. Louisville	L 81–93	7–4	Madison Square Garden; New York, New York
Jan 7, 1984		Fordham	W 59–52	8–4 (1–0)	Hynes Athletic Center; New Rochelle, New York
Jan 11, 1984		Manhattan	W 86–76	9–4 (2–0)	Hynes Athletic Center; New Rochelle, New York
Jan 14, 1984		at Army	W 77–63	10–4 (3–0)	USMA Fieldhouse; West Point, New York
Jan 17, 1984*		at St. Francis (NY)	W 90–73	11–4	Pope Physical Education Center; Brooklyn, New York
Jan 21, 1984		at Fairfield	W 86–64	12–4 (4–0)	Alumni Hall; Fairfield, Connecticut
Jan 23, 1984*		New Orleans	W 80–70	13–4	Hynes Athletic Center; New Rochelle, New York
Jan 26, 1984		La Salle	L 80–95	13–5 (4–1)	Hynes Athletic Center; New Rochelle, New York
Jan 28, 1984		Saint Peter's	W 70–58	14–5 (5–1)	Hynes Athletic Center; New Rochelle, New York
Feb 1, 1984		Holy Cross	W 93–73	15–5 (6–1)	Hynes Athletic Center; New Rochelle, New York
Feb 4, 1984		at Fordham	W 87–74	16–5 (7–1)	Rose Hill Gym; Bronx, New York
Feb 8, 1984		at Manhattan	W 82–59	17–5 (8–1)	Draddy Gymnasium; New York, New York
Feb 11, 1984		Army	W 74–63	18–5 (9–1)	Hynes Athletic Center; New Rochelle, New York
Feb 15, 1984		at Holy Cross	W 90–79	19–5 (10–1)	Hart Recreation Center; Worcester, Massachusetts
Feb 18, 1984		Fairfield	W 91–88	20–5 (11–1)	Hynes Athletic Center; New Rochelle, New York
Feb 22, 1984		at La Salle	L 79–81	20–6 (11–2)	Palestra; Philadelphia, Pennsylvania
Feb 25, 1984		at Saint Peter's	L 55–57	20–7 (11–3)	Yanitelli Center; Jersey City, New Jersey
MAAC tournament
Mar 8, 1984*		vs. Holy Cross; Quarterfinals	W 73–66	21–7	New Haven Coliseum; New Haven, Connecticut
Mar 9, 1984*		vs. Saint Peter's; Semifinals	W 59–56	22–7	Brendan Byrne Arena; East Rutherford, New Jersey
Mar 10, 1984*		vs. Fordham; Championship game	W 72–61	23–7	Brendan Byrne Arena; East Rutherford, New Jersey
NCAA tournament
Mar 16, 1984*	(10 E)	vs. (7 E) Virginia; First round	L 57–58	23–8	Brendan Byrne Arena; East Rutherford, New Jersey
*Non-conference game. ^{#}Rankings from AP poll. (#) Tournament seedings in parentheses. E=East. All times are in Eastern Time.

== Awards and honors ==
- Steve Burtt – MAAC Player of the Year

== NBA draft ==
Round	Pick	Player	NBA club
2	30	Steve Burtt	Golden State Warriors
