= Fran Fraschilla =

ESPN College Basketball commentator

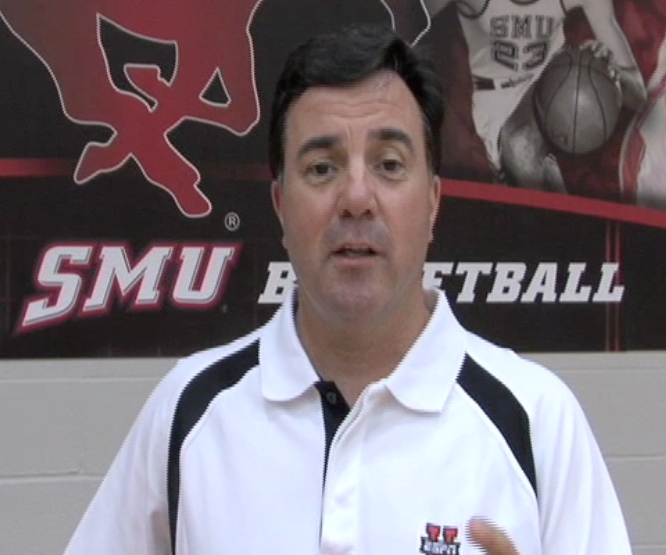

Biographical details
- Born: August 30, 1958 (age 68); Brooklyn, New York, U.S.
- Education: Brooklyn College

Coaching career (HC unless noted)
- 1979–1980: New York Tech (assistant)
- 1980–1981: Rhode Island (assistant)
- 1981–1987: Ohio (assistant)
- 1987–1989: Ohio State (assistant)
- 1989–1992: Providence (assistant)
- 1992–1996: Manhattan
- 1996–1998: St. John's
- 1999–2002: New Mexico

Head coaching record
- Overall: 176–99 (.640)
- Tournaments: 1–3 (NCAA Division I); 3–5 (NIT)

Accomplishments and honors

Championships
- 2 MAAC regular season (1993, 1995); MAAC tournament (1993)

Awards
- MAAC Coach of the Year (1995)

Francis John Fraschilla (born August 30, 1958) is an American ESPN basketball commentator. He is also a former college basketball coach for 23 years, whose teams when he was head coach had an aggregate record of 176–99, as they won 64% of their games. He was named the 1994-95 Metro Atlantic Athletic Conference Men's Basketball Coach of the Year.

== Early life and education ==
Born in Brooklyn, New York City, Fraschilla grew up in its Sheepshead Bay neighborhood. He is the oldest of seven children in an Irish-Italian family. His paternal grandparents, Francesco and Josephina Fraschilla, immigrated to the United States from Sicily in 1920.

He graduated from James Madison High School in Brooklyn. Fraschilla played basketball for the high school.

Fraschilla then graduated from Brooklyn College with a bachelors degree in American history in 1980. While attending Brooklyn College he worked part time as the Madison High School junior varsity basketball coach, and then in 1979 worked as an assistant basketball coach at the New York Institute of Technology. His senior thesis advisor was General Béla Király, a Hungarian freedom fighter who emigrated to the U.S. to teach history. Fraschilla was the first in his family to graduate from college.

== College basketball coach career ==
Fraschilla coached college basketball for 23 years. He was an assistant basketball coach at the University of Rhode Island for Jack Kraft, at Ohio University for Danny Nee and Billy Hahn, at Ohio State University for Hall of Fame Coach Gary Williams, and at Providence College for current University of Tennessee coach Rick Barnes.

=== Manhattan Jaspers ===
Fraschilla then served as head men's basketball coach at three schools, where his teams had an aggregate record of 175-100. They won 64% of their games.

He was head coach of the Manhattan College Jaspers from 1992, when he was 33 years old, to 1996, where his teams had an 85–35 record, a 71% won-lost percentage, and won two Metro Atlantic Athletic Conference (MAAC) titles and the 1993 MAAC men's basketball tournament championship. In 1995 the Jaspers became the first Jaspers team in 35 years to compete in the NCAA Basketball Tournament and the first team from the MAAC to obtain an at-large bid to the NCAA tournament, and there they defeated the fourth-seeded Oklahoma Sooners in the first round, before losing in the second round to the Arizona State Sun Devils. He was named the 1994–95 Metro Atlantic Athletic Conference Men's Basketball Coach of the Year, after his team's 26-5 season.

=== St. John's Red Storm ===
He next was the head basketball coach of the St. John's University Red Storm from 1996, when he was 38 years old, to 1998. He inherited a team that had a record of 11-16 the prior season. To inspire focus on team play, he ordered that his players’ names be removed from the backs of their jerseys, to emphasize that the only name that mattered was the one on the front: St. John’s. At St. John's, he took the team to its first NCAA basketball tournament in five years in 1998, and his teams had a 59% won-lost percentage.

=== New Mexico Lobos ===
He followed that up with three years as head basketball coach of the University of New Mexico Lobos from 1999 to 2002. With New Mexico, Fraschilla's teams had a 57% won-lost percentage. From 1994 to 2002, he was the chairman of the National Association of Basketball Coaches' committee on academics.

== ESPN basketball broadcast analyst career ==
After coaching, in 2003 he joined ESPN as a TV college basketball broadcast analyst. Fraschilla currently serves as a game analyst on Big Monday broadcasts, covering primarily Big 12 action, and as a studio analyst for ESPN college basketball programming. He also covers the NBA draft, focusing mostly on foreign players. His co-broadcaster on many Big 12 games previously was Brent Musburger. Fraschilla also serves as ESPN's analyst for its broadcasts of FIBA tournaments.

== Accolades ==
In 1995, Fraschilla was named Metro Atlantic Athletic Conference Men's Basketball Coach of the Year, National Association Basketball Coaches District II Coach of the Year, Eastern Basketball Coach of the Year, and Metropolitan Basketball Writers Association Coach of the Year. In 2002, he received the National Association of Basketball Coaches Literacy Pioneer Award for working with the “Dream to Read”program. In 2012, he was inducted into the Manhattan College Athletic Hall of Fame. In 2019, he was inducted into the Basketball Old-Timers of America Hall of Fame.

== Personal life ==
Fraschilla married Meg O’Connell in 1988. He later moved to White Plains, New York, and still later to Dallas, Texas.

His older son James Fraschilla played in 27 games over four years as a guard for the University of Oklahoma men's basketball team, and was nominated for the Big 12 Sportsperson of the Year Award. He then worked from 2017-18 as the Player Development Coach for the Salt Lake City Stars (the Utah Jazz’s G League team), from 2018-22 on the basketball staff of the Orlando Magic, in 2022-23 as an assistant coach for the Grand Rapids Gold G League team, in 2024 an assistant coach for the 2024 USA 3x3 Men's National Team, and from 2023-25 as the assistant coach for the Capital City Go-Go (the NBA G League affiliate of the Washington Wizards), and since 2025 as an assistant coach for the Washington Wizards,.

Fraschilla's younger son, Matthew Fraschilla, played guard for the basketball team at Harvard University, from which he graduated in 2017. He suffered a ACL tear after his junior year. After his injury he coached as a graduate assistant coach at Villanova University under Coach Jay Wright, and also became a pseudo-assistant coach at Harvard. He was an assistant coach for the Harvard Crimson from 2022 to 2026. In April 2026 he became an assistant coach of the Georgia Tech Yellow Jackets.

== Head coaching record ==
Record table
Season	Team	Overall	Conference	Standing	Postseason
Manhattan Jaspers (Metro Atlantic Athletic Conference) (1992–1996)
1992–93	Manhattan	23–7	12–2	1st	NCAA Division I First Round
1993–94	Manhattan	20–10	10–4	T–2nd	NIT First Round
1994–95	Manhattan	26–5	12–2	1st	NCAA Division I Second Round
1995–96	Manhattan	17–12	9–5	3rd	NIT First Round
Manhattan:		86–34 (.717)	43–13 (.768)		
St. John's Red Storm (Big East Conference) (1996–1998)
1996–97	St. John's	13–14	8–10	T–4th (BE6)	
1997–98	St. John's	22–10	13–5	2nd (BE6)	NCAA Division I First Round
St. John's:		35–24 (.593)	21–15 (.583)		
New Mexico Lobos (Mountain West Conference) (1999–2002)
1999–00	New Mexico	18–14	9–5	3rd	NIT Second Round
2000–01	New Mexico	21–13	6–8	T–5th	NIT Quarterfinal
2001–02	New Mexico	16–14	6–8	6th	NIT First Round
New Mexico:		55–41 (.573)	21–21 (.500)		
Total:		176–99 (.640)			
National champion Postseason invitational champion Conference regular season champion Conference regular season and conference tournament champion Division regular season champion Division regular season and conference tournament champion Conference tournament champion
