= 1992–93 Manhattan Jaspers basketball team =

American college basketball season

1992–93 Manhattan Jaspers basketball

MAAC Regular season champions MAAC tournament champions

NCAA tournament, Round of 64
- Conference: Metro Atlantic Athletic Conference
- Record: 23–7 (12–2 MAAC)
- Head coach: Fran Fraschilla (1st season)
- Home arena: Draddy Gymnasium

1992–93 MAAC men's basketball standings
	Conf.				Overall
Team	W		L	PCT	W		L	PCT
Manhattan †	12	–	2	.857	23	–	7	.767
Niagara	11	–	3	.786	23	–	7	.767
Iona	9	–	5	.643	16	–	11	.593
Siena	8	–	6	.571	16	–	13	.552
Fairfield	7	–	7	.500	14	–	13	.519
Canisius	5	–	9	.357	10	–	18	.357
Saint Peter's	3	–	11	.214	9	–	18	.333
Loyola (MD)	1	–	13	.071	2	–	25	.074
† 1993 MAAC tournament winner Rankings from AP Poll

The 1992–93 Manhattan Jaspers basketball team represented Manhattan College during the 1992–93 NCAA Division I men's basketball season. The Jaspers, led by first year head coach Fran Fraschilla, played their home games at Draddy Gymnasium and were members of the Metro Atlantic Athletic Conference. They finished the season 23–7, 12–2 in MAAC play to finish in first place. They were champions of the MAAC tournament to earn an automatic bid to the NCAA tournament where they lost in the first round to Virginia.

== Roster ==
1992–93 Manhattan Jaspers men's basketball team
Players	Coaches
Pos. / # / Name / Height / Weight / Year / Hometown; F / 45 / Keith Bullock / 6 ft 7 in (2.01 m) / — / Sr	Head coach: Fran Fraschilla; Assistant coach(es) Legend: (C) Team captain; (S) Suspended; (I) Ineligible; (W) Walk-on; Injured; Current redshirt

== Schedule and results ==
Date time, TV	Rank^{#}	Opponent^{#}	Result	Record	Site (attendance) city, state
Non-conference regular season
Dec 1, 1992*		Hofstra	W 80–58	1–0	Draddy Gymnasium (2,101); New York, New York
Dec 4, 1992*		vs. TCU	W 67–42	2–0	Bradley Center (13,159); Milwaukee, Wisconsin
Dec 5, 1992*		at Marquette	L 62–85	2–1	Bradley Center (10,447); Milwaukee, Wisconsin
Dec 8, 1992*		at Marist	W 62–59	3–1	McCann Recreation Center (2,438); Poughkeepsie, New York
Dec 12, 1992*		at Bradley	W 61–54	4–1	Carver Arena (6,178); Peoria, Illinois
Dec 19, 1992*		Army	W 83–51	5–1	Draddy Gymnasium (1,639); New York, New York
Dec 21, 1992*		Fordham	W 92–67	6–1	Draddy Gymnasium (3,091); New York, New York
Dec 28, 1992*		vs. St. John's; ECAC Holiday Festival	L 59–74	6–2	Madison Square Garden (14,110); New York, New York
Dec 29, 1992*		vs. Rutgers; ECAC Holiday Festival	L 76–80	6–3	Madison Square Garden (14,856); New York, New York
Jan 4, 1993*		at Columbia	L 80–84	6–4	Levien Gymnasium (750); New York City, NY
Jan 6, 1993*		Holy Cross	W 74–70	7–4	Draddy Gymnasium (2,417); New York, New York
Jan 11, 1993*		at Colgate	W 85–78	8–4	Cotterell Court (515); Hamilton, NY
MAAC Regular season
Jan 14, 1993		at Niagara	L 64–83	8–5 (0–1)	Niagara Falls Convention Center (2,341); Niagara Falls, NY
Jan 16, 1993		at Canisius	W 64–60	9–5 (1–1)	Koessler Athletic Center (1,189); Buffalo, NY
Jan 21, 1993		Niagara	W 70–69	10–5 (2–1)	Draddy Gymnasium (2,817); New York, New York
Jan 23, 1993		at Saint Peter's	W 57–48	11–5 (3–1)	Yanitelli Center (2,264); Jersey City, NJ
Jan 27, 1993		Siena	W 64–62	12–5 (4–1)	Draddy Gymnasium (2,614); New York, New York
Jan 30, 1993		Iona	W 83–74	13–5 (5–1)	Draddy Gymnasium (2,789); New York, New York
Feb 2, 1993		at Loyola (MD)	W 77–62	14–5 (6–1)	Reitz Arena (1,032); Baltimore, MD
Feb 10, 1993		Fairfield	W 82–71	15–5 (7–1)	Draddy Gymnasium (1,526); New York, New York
Feb 13, 1993		Canisius	W 75–55	16–5 (8–1)	Draddy Gymnasium (2,309); New York, New York
Feb 15, 1993		at Iona	W 89–76	17–5 (9–1)	Hynes Athletic Center (3,116); New Rochelle, NY
Feb 20, 1993		at Siena	L 76–84	17–6 (9–2)	Knickerbocker Arena (7,132); Albany, NY
Feb 22, 1993		Saint Peter's	W 89–77	18–6 (10–2)	Draddy Gymnasium (1,390); New York, New York
Feb 27, 1993		at Fairfield	W 82–71	19–6 (11–2)	Alumni Hall (3,022); Fairfield, CT
Mar 1, 1993		Loyola (MD)	W 79–62	20–6 (12–2)	Draddy Gymnasium (2,209); New York, New York
MAAC tournament
Mar 5, 1993*	(1)	vs. (8) Loyola (MD); Quarterfinals	W 57–37	21–6	Knickerbocker Arena (9,995); Albany, New York
Mar 6, 1993*	(1)	at (4) Siena; Semifinals	W 71–70	22–6	Knickerbocker Arena (9,145); Albany, New York
Mar 7, 1993*	(1)	vs. (2) Niagara; Championship	W 68–67	23–6	Knickerbocker Arena (5,651); Albany, New York
NCAA tournament
Mar 19, 1993*	(11 E)	vs. (6 E) Virginia; First Round	L 66–78	23–7	Carrier Dome (12,703); Syracuse, NY
*Non-conference game. ^{#}Rankings from AP Poll, (#) during NCAA Tournament is seed within region E=East. (#) Tournament seedings in parentheses. All times are in Eastern Time.
