= 1985 MAAC men's basketball tournament =

- Classification: Division I
- Season: 1984–85
- Teams: 8
- Site: Meadowlands Arena; East Rutherford, New Jersey
- Champions: Iona (3rd title)
- Winning coach: Pat Kennedy (3rd title)
- MVP: Tony Hargraves (Iona)

1984–85 MAAC men's basketball standings
	Conf.				Overall
Team	W		L	PCT	W		L	PCT
Iona †	11	–	3	.786	26	–	5	.839
Fordham	9	–	5	.643	19	–	12	.613
Holy Cross	8	–	6	.571	9	–	19	.321
La Salle	8	–	6	.571	15	–	13	.536
Army	7	–	7	.500	16	–	13	.552
Saint Peter's	5	–	9	.357	15	–	14	.517
Manhattan	4	–	10	.286	8	–	20	.286
Fairfield	4	–	10	.286	11	–	17	.393
† 1985 MAAC tournament winner Rankings from AP Poll

The 1985 MAAC men's basketball tournament was held March 1–3 with the quarterfinal round held at the New Haven Coliseum in New Haven, Connecticut and the semifinals and championship game held at the Meadowlands Arena in East Rutherford, New Jersey.

Iona defeated Fordham in the championship game, 57–54, to win their third MAAC men's basketball tournament in four years.

The Gaels received a bid to the 1985 NCAA tournament where Loyola beat them– Chicago in the opening round, 59–58. It was the second straight season Iona was eliminated from the NCAA Tournament in a 1-point defeat.

== Format ==
All eight of the conference's members participated in the tournament field. They were seeded based on regular season conference records, with all teams starting play in the quarterfinal round. An additional third place game was also played on the last day of the tournament.

All games were played at a neutral site at the Meadowlands Arena in East Rutherford, New Jersey.

== Bracket ==
Quarterfinals; Friday, March 1
1	Iona	95
8	Fairfield	61
4	La Salle	64
5	Army	76
3	Holy Cross	66
6	Saint Peter's	70
2	Fordham	44
7	Manhattan	42

Semifinals; Saturday, March 2
1	Iona	59
5	Army	57
6	St. Peter's	55
2	Fordham	62

Championship; Sunday, March 3
1	Iona	57
2	Fordham	54
Third Place Sunday, March 3
5	Army	71
6	St. Peter's	66
