= 1982 MAAC men's basketball tournament =

- Classification: Division I
- Season: 1981–82
- Teams: 6
- First round site: Campus Sites; Campus Arenas
- Finals site: Meadowlands Arena; East Rutherford, NJ
- Champions: Iona (1st title)
- Winning coach: Pat Kennedy (1st title)
- MVP: Rory Grimes (Iona)

1981–82 MAAC men's basketball standings
	Conf.				Overall
Team	W		L	PCT	W		L	PCT
Saint Peter's	9	–	1	.900	20	–	9	.690
Fordham	8	–	2	.800	18	–	11	.621
Iona †	7	–	3	.700	24	–	9	.727
Fairfield	3	–	7	.300	11	–	18	.379
Manhattan	3	–	7	.300	11	–	16	.407
Army	0	–	10	.000	5	–	22	.185
† 1982 MAAC tournament winner Rankings from AP Poll

The 1982 MAAC men's basketball tournament was held March 5–7 at a combination of on-campus gymnasiums and the Meadowlands Arena in East Rutherford, New Jersey. This was the first edition of the tournament.

Iona upset top-seeded St. Peter's in the championship game, 66–61, to win their first MAAC men's basketball tournament.

No MAAC team was invited to the NCAA tournament this year.

== Format ==
All six of the conference's members participated in the tournament field. They were seeded based on regular season conference records, with the top two teams earning byes into the semifinal round. The other four teams entered into the preliminary first round. An additional third place game was also played on the last day of the tournament.

First Round games were played at the home court of the higher-seeded team. All remaining games were played at a neutral site at the Meadowlands Arena in East Rutherford, New Jersey.

== Bracket ==
First round Friday, March 5
5	Manhattan	55
4	Fairfield	61
3	Iona	69
6	Army	53

Semifinals; Saturday, March 6
1	St. Peter's	56
4	Fairfield	50
3	Iona	58
2	Fordham	55

Championship; Sunday, March 7
1	St. Peter's	61
3	Iona	66
Third Place Sunday, March 7
4	Fairfield	54
2	Fordham	76
