= Steve Burtt Sr. =

American basketball player (born 1962)

Steve Burtt
Personal information
- Born: November 5, 1962 (age 64) New York City, New York, U.S.
- Listed height: 6 ft 2 in (1.88 m)
- Listed weight: 185 lb (84 kg)

Career information
- High school: Charles Evans Hughes (New York City, New York)
- College: Iona (1980–1984)
- NBA draft: 1984: 2nd round, 30th overall pick
- Drafted by: Golden State Warriors
- Playing career: 1984–2000
- Position: Point guard
- Number: 15

Career history
- 1984–1985: Golden State Warriors
- 1985–1986: Westchester Golden Apples
- 1985: Connecticut Colonials
- 1985–1986: Albany Patroons
- 1987: Jersey Jammers
- 1987: Long Island Knights
- 1987–1988: Savannah Spirits
- 1987–1988: Los Angeles Clippers
- 1988–1989: Gravelines
- 1989–1990: Albany Patroons
- 1990–1991: Oklahoma City Cavalry
- 1991: Halifax Windjammers
- 1991: Shell Rimula X
- 1991: Oklahoma City Cavalry
- 1991–1992: Phoenix Suns
- 1992: Oklahoma City Cavalry
- 1992: Iraklis Thessaloniki
- 1992–1993: Oklahoma City Cavalry
- 1992–1993: Washington Bullets
- 1993: Westchester Stallions
- 1993–1994: Maccabi Rishon LeZion
- 1994–1995: Illycaffé Trieste
- 1995–1996: Reyer Venezia Mestre
- 1996–1997: Genertel Trieste
- 1997: Long Island Surf
- 1997–1998: Casetti Imola
- 1998–1999: Scandone Avellino
- 1999–2000: Banco Sardegna Sassari

Career highlights
- Italian League Top Scorer (1997); Italian All-Star Game 3-Point Contest Champion (1998); 2× MAAC Player of the Year (1983, 1984); 3× First-team All-MAAC (1982–1984); MAAC tournament MVP (1984); Haggerty Award (1984); 3× AP Honorable Mention All-American (1982, 1983, 1984)

Career NBA statistics
- Points: 584 (5.6 ppg)
- Rebounds: 92 (0.9 rpg)
- Blocks: 123 (1.2 apg)
- Stats at NBA.com
- Stats at Basketball Reference

Steven Dwayne Burtt (born November 5, 1962) is an American former professional basketball player. The 6'2" point guard played in the National Basketball Association (NBA) sporadically from 1984 until 1993. He also had an established playing career overseas. Born in New York City, Burtt played high school basketball for Charles Evans Hughes before enrolling at Iona to play for the Gaels. Burtt now teaches at Bronx Collegiate Academy (Bronx, New York).

== College career ==
In his 4 seasons with Iona, Burtt played in 121 games, averaging 20.9 points per game, 3.5 rebounds per game and 1.7 steals per game. He is the all-time leader of Iona in total points scored for the school with 2,534. He also has several other school records, including career field goals made, field goals attempted, and season field goals made. Burtt also held the single-season scoring record with 732, a record broken in 2006 by his son, Steve Burtt Jr. During his college career he was a three time All-MAAC first team (1982–1984) member and twice All-MAAC Player of the Year (1983–1984). They are one of just two father-son duos to score 2,000 points each in NCAA Division I basketball, the other being Dell Curry and Steph Curry.

== Professional career ==
Burtt was selected 30th overall in the 1984 NBA draft by the Golden State Warriors. In his rookie season injuries shortened his playing to 47 games, averaging 4.2 points per game on .383 shooting.

He played professionally in Greece in 1992 before being banned for life from its basketball league for drug violations, consisting of cocaine and hashish found in his luggage returning from a visit to the US. In Italy Burtt changed teams annually in Serie A and, in a timespan of six years, he contested in 155 games averaging 28.4 points, 3.3 rebounds and 2.6 assists per game. In 2007, Burtt was named by Maccabi Rishon LeZion B.C. as the "Best Foreigner Player" of the last 20 years.

== Career statistics ==
Legend
GP	Games played	GS	Games started	MPG	Minutes per game
FG%	Field goal percentage	3P%	3-point field goal percentage	FT%	Free throw percentage
RPG	Rebounds per game	APG	Assists per game	SPG	Steals per game
BPG	Blocks per game	PPG	Points per game	**Bold**	Career high

=== NBA ===
==== Regular season ====
Year	Team	GP	GS	MPG	FG%	3P%	FT%	RPG	APG	SPG	BPG	PPG
1984–85	Golden State	**47**	0	8.9	.383	.000	.688	.6	.4	.4	.1	4.2
1987–88	L.A. Clippers	19	0	**16.4**	.449	.000	.681	**1.4**	**2.0**	**.5**	**.3**	**9.0**
1991–92	Phoenix	31	**2**	11.5	**.463**	.167	.704	1.1	1.9	**.5**	.1	6.0
1992–93	Washington	4	0	8.8	.385	**.333**	**.800**	.8	1.5	**.5**	.0	7.3
Career		101	2	11.1	.426	.143	.695	.9	1.2	.5	.1	5.8

==== Playoffs ====
Year	Team	GP	GS	MPG	FG%	3P%	FT%	RPG	APG	SPG	BPG	PPG
1992	Phoenix	8	0	13.0	.421	.000	.857	1.5	1.8	.6	.0	6.3

== Personal life ==
Burtt is the father of former Iona College basketball player Steve Burtt Jr., who shares his name, and played for the senior Ukraine national team.
