= 1984–85 Iona Gaels men's basketball team =

American college basketball season

1984–85 Iona Gaels men's basketball
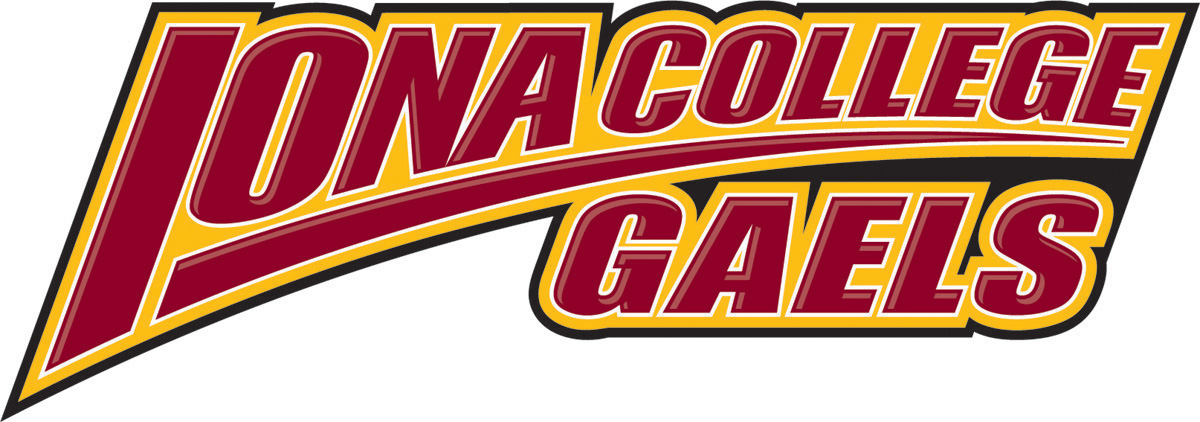

MAAC Regular Season Champions MAAC tournament champions

NCAA tournament, First Round
- Conference: Metro Atlantic Athletic Conference
- Record: 26–5 (11–3 MAAC)
- Head coach: Pat Kennedy (5th season)
- Home arena: Hynes Athletic Center

1984–85 MAAC men's basketball standings
	Conf.				Overall
Team	W		L	PCT	W		L	PCT
Iona †	11	–	3	.786	26	–	5	.839
Fordham	9	–	5	.643	19	–	12	.613
Holy Cross	8	–	6	.571	9	–	19	.321
La Salle	8	–	6	.571	15	–	13	.536
Army	7	–	7	.500	16	–	13	.552
Saint Peter's	5	–	9	.357	15	–	14	.517
Manhattan	4	–	10	.286	8	–	20	.286
Fairfield	4	–	10	.286	11	–	17	.393
† 1985 MAAC tournament winner Rankings from AP Poll

The 1984–85 Iona Gaels men's basketball team represented Iona College during the 1984–85 NCAA Division I men's basketball season. The Gaels, led fifth-year by head coach Pat Kennedy, played their home games at the Hynes Athletic Center and were members of the Metro Atlantic Athletic Conference. The Gaals finished atop the MAAC regular season standings, and would go on to win the MAAC Basketball tournament to receive an automatic bid to the 1984 NCAA tournament. As the No. 13 seed in the East region, the Gaels lost to No. 4 seed Loyola–Chicago in the opening round.

== Roster ==
1984–85 Iona Gaels men's basketball team
Players	Coaches
Pos. / # / Name / Height / Weight / Year / Hometown; F / / Tony Hargraves / 6 ft 4 in (1.93 m) / — / Sr	Head coach: Pat Kennedy; Assistant coach(es) Legend: (C) Team captain; (S) Suspended; (I) Ineligible; (W) Walk-on; Injured; Current redshirt; Roster

== Schedule and results ==
Date time, TV	Rank^{#}	Opponent^{#}	Result	Record	Site (attendance) city, state
Regular season
Nov 27, 1984*		Hofstra	W 80–72	1–0	Hynes Athletics Center; New Rochelle, New York
Dec 1, 1984*		Marist	W 86–78	2–0	Hynes Athletics Center; New Rochelle, New York
Dec 4, 1984*		Saint Leo	W 97–66	3–0	Hynes Athletics Center; New Rochelle, New York
Dec 7, 1984*		Bucknell	W 81–68	4–0	Hynes Athletics Center; New Rochelle, New York
Dec 8, 1984*		Idaho State; Iona Classic	W 74–69	5–0	Hynes Athletics Center; New Rochelle, New York
Dec 12, 1984*		St. Francis (NY); Iona Classic	W 72–60	6–0	Hynes Athletics Center; New Rochelle, New York
Dec 15, 1984*		Duquesne	W 81–67	7–0	Hynes Athletics Center; New Rochelle, New York
Dec 22, 1984*		at No. 3 Memphis State	L 62–76	7–1	Mid-South Coliseum; Memphis, Tennessee
Dec 28, 1984*		vs. Connecticut; Connecticut Mutual Classic	W 55–54	8–1	Hartford Civic Center; Hartford, Connecticut
Dec 29, 1984*		vs. William & Mary; Connecticut Mutual Classic	W 68–55	9–1	Hartford Civic Center; Hartford, Connecticut
Jan 3, 1985		at La Salle	W 103–73	10–1 (1–0)	The Palestra; Philadelphia, Pennsylvania
Jan 5, 1985*		at Monmouth	W 70–67	11–1	Boylan Gymnasium; West Long Branch, New Jersey
Jan 9, 1985*		at Detroit	W 87–82	12–1	Calihan Hall; Detroit, Michigan
Jan 12, 1985*		at New Orleans	W 72–66	13–1	Lakefront Arena; New Orleans, Louisiana
Jan 19, 1985		Fairfield	W 110–97	14–1 (2–0)	Hynes Athletics Center; New Rochelle, New York
Jan 26, 1985		at Saint Peter's	W 52–48	16–1 (4–0)	Yanitelli Center; Jersey City, New Jersey
Jan 29, 1985		vs. Fordham	W 53–47	17–1 (5–0)	Brendan Byrne Arena; East Rutherford, New Jersey
Jan 31, 1985		at Holy Cross	L 85–102	17–2 (5–1)	Hart Center; Worcester, Massachusetts
Feb 2, 1985		Fordham	W 66–65	18–2 (6–1)	Hynes Athletics Center; New Rochelle, New York
Feb 5, 1985		vs. Manhattan	W 77–69	19–2 (7–1)	Madison Square Garden; New York, New York
Feb 9, 1985		at Army	L 73–76	19–3 (7–2)	Gillis Field House; West Point, New York
Feb 12, 1985		Holy Cross	W 80–58	20–3 (8–2)	Hynes Athletics Center; New Rochelle, New York
Feb 14, 1985		Army	W 47–45	21–3 (9–2)	Hynes Athletics Center; New Rochelle, New York
Feb 16, 1985		at Fairfield	L 71–73	21–4 (9–3)	Alumni Hall; Fairfield, Connecticut
Feb 20, 1985		vs. Manhattan	W 84–70	22–4 (10–3)	Madison Square Garden; New York, New York
Feb 24, 1985		Saint Peter's	W 66–60	23–4 (11–3)	Hynes Athletics Center; New Rochelle, New York
MAAC tournament
Mar 1, 1985*	(1)	vs. (8) Fairfield; Quarterfinals	W 95–61	24–4	Brendan Byrne Arena; East Rutherford, New Jersey
Mar 2, 1985*	(1)	vs. (5) Army; Semifinals	W 59–57	25–4	Brendan Byrne Arena; East Rutherford, New Jersey
Mar 3, 1985*	(1)	vs. (2) Fordham; Championship game	W 57–54	26–4	Brendan Byrne Arena; East Rutherford, New Jersey
NCAA tournament
Mar 14, 1985*	(13 E)	vs. (4 E) No. 14 Loyola–Chicago; First round	L 58–59	26–5	Hartford Civic Center; Hartford, Connecticut
*Non-conference game. ^{#}Rankings from AP poll. (#) Tournament seedings in parentheses. E=East. All times are in Eastern Time.
