= Joe Mihalich =

American basketball player-coach (born 1956)

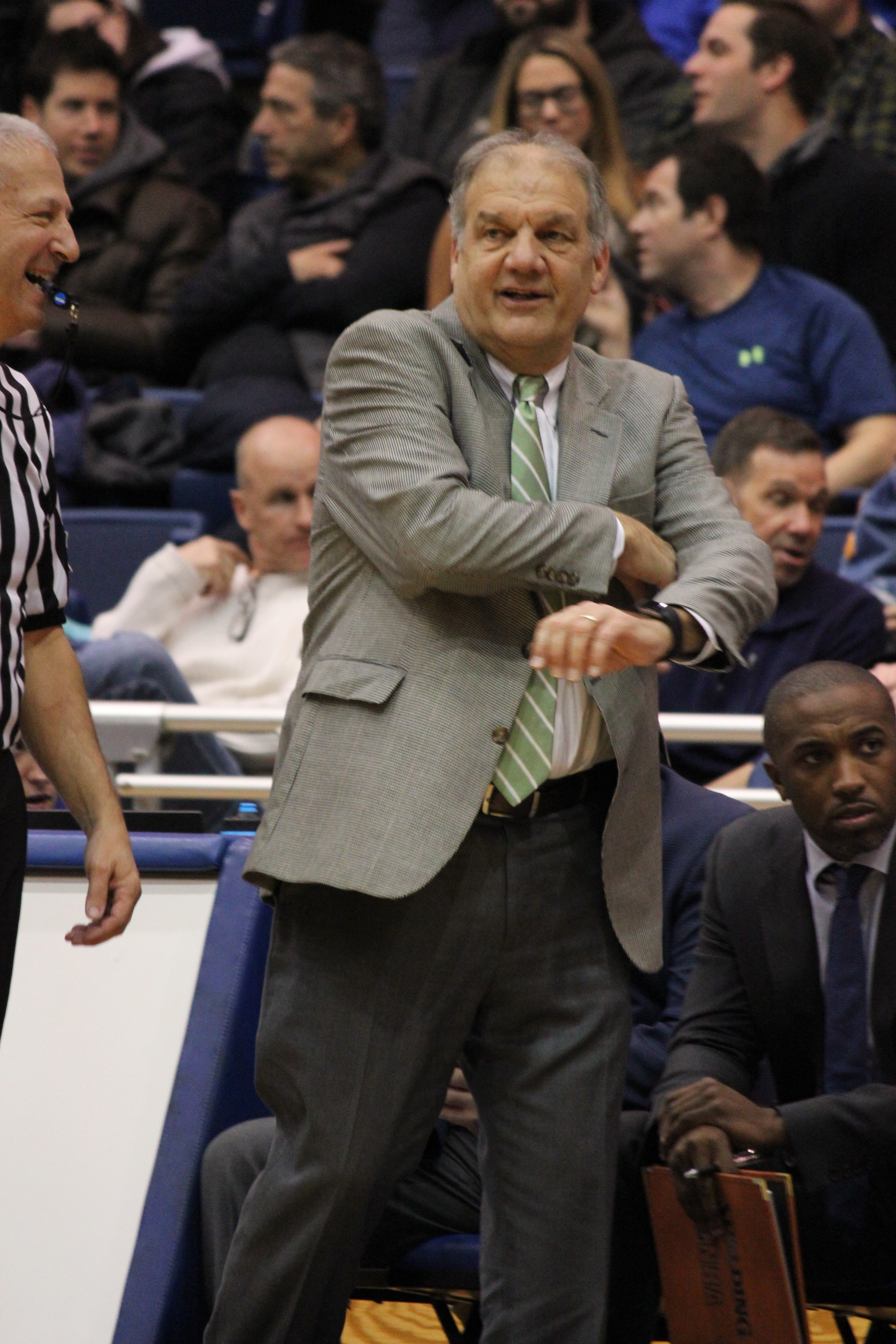

Current position
- Title: Special Assistant to HC
- Team: La Salle
- Conference: Atlantic 10

Biographical details
- Born: August 29, 1956 (age 70); Washington, D.C., U.S.

Playing career
- 1974–1978: La Salle
- Position: Guard

Coaching career (HC unless noted)
- 1978–1981: DeMatha Catholic HS (assistant)
- 1981–1998: La Salle (assistant)
- 1998–2013: Niagara
- 2013–2021: Hofstra

Administrative career (AD unless noted)
- 2021–2022: Hofstra (Sp. Adv. to the AD)
- 2022–present: La Salle (Sp. Ast. to the HC)

Head coaching record
- Overall: 406–295 (.579)

Accomplishments and honors

Championships
- 2 MAAC tournament champion (2005, 2007); 3 MAAC regular season champion (1999, 2005, 2013); 3 CAA regular season champion (2016, 2019, 2020); CAA tournament (2020)

Awards
- Skip Prosser Man of the Year Award (2013); 3× MAAC Coach of the Year (1999, 2005, 2013); CAA Coach of the Year (2019)

Joseph Anthony Mihalich (born August 29, 1956) is an American former college basketball coach and current Special Assistant to the Head Coach at La Salle University.

Mihalich was previously the men's basketball head coach at Hofstra University from 2013–2021. Prior to that, he led Niagara to two NCAA tournaments, in 2005 and 2007, and three NIT Tournaments, in 2004, 2009 and 2013.

He received the Skip Prosser Man of the Year Award in 2013.

== Career ==
=== Assistant coach ===
==== La Salle ====
Mihalich spent 17 years, from 1981–1998, at his alma mater as an assistant coach under head coaches Dave “Lefty” Ervin and the legendary William “Speedy” Morris. Mihalich was a part of eight postseason appearances including five NCAA Tournament teams. Mihalich coached several players at La Salle who would go on to play professionally in the National Basketball Association (NBA); including Simmons, Doug Overton, Randy Woods and Tim Legler.

The son of a La Salle professor, his basketball career began as a guard on the La Salle Explorers team as a walk-on, playing from 1974 to 1978. Mihalich literally was raised up the street from the La Salle campus, on Chew Avenue in the Mount Airy section of Philadelphia. He was in the right place at the right time, playing on teams coached by Paul Westhead. The Explorers made the NCAA tournament in Mihalich's freshman year. Their star was Joe Bryant, Kobe's dad. La Salle eventually lost in overtime to Syracuse, which made the Final Four.

Basketball and sports were already in his family blood. His late father, Joseph C. Mihalich, was a pitcher in the New York Yankees farm system in the late 1940s, rooming with Whitey Ford before arm troubles sent him on the road to college studies and La Salle, where the elder Mihalich became a professor in philosophy, carving an academic niche in the subject of sports philosophy, while his son, Joseph A., played for Westhead before starting his coaching career.

The Explorers made the NCAA tournament again his senior year. By then Mihalich knew he wanted to coach. He moved to the Maryland suburbs of Washington after graduation to be an assistant at DeMatha High School to legendary coach Morgan Wootten.

=== Head coach ===
==== Niagara ====
Mihalich took his first head coaching opportunity by the horns and became the most steady program in the MAAC, earning a slew of honors, awards and postseason appearances in his 15 years at the helm of Niagara. At Niagara Mihalich amassed 265 victories making the NIT in 2004, 2009, and 2013 winning a game over Troy State in 2004. Mihalich's Niagara squads made the NCAA Tournaments in 2005 and 2007 winning a game versus Florida A & M in 2007. Mihalich's teams are known for their up-tempo style scoring 70 points per game in nine of the last 10 seasons. Mihalich himself said "I played for Paul Westhead in college, coached with Morgan Wooten and Speedy Morris I think the up-tempo style is fun. Fun to play that way, fun to coach that way, it’s fun to watch." This up-tempo, fun to watch style has earned Mihalich accolades to numerous to fully list however a few of his honors are; MAAC Coach of the Year in his first season at Niagara (1998–99), 2008 NABC District Coach of the Year, 2005 United States Basketball Writers Association (USBWA) District II Coach of the Year, 2007 Basketball Coaches Association of New York (BCANY) Coach of the Year Award, and 2013 MAAC Coach of the Year Award.

==== Hofstra ====
A year of turmoil on and off the court led to head coach Mo Cassara being relieved of duties on March 22, 2013. After a nationwide search, on April 10, 2013, Hofstra University President Stuart Rabinowitz and Athletic Director Jeffrey Hathaway announced the hire of Mihalich. Mihalich brought over to his staff assistant coaches Mike Farrelly and Shane Nichols from Niagara. Mihalich later added Hofstra legend Craig "Speedy" Claxton as special assistant to the head coach, and who now serves as a Head Coach for the team. In 2018–19, Mihalich led the Pride to the regular-season CAA title and was named CAA Coach of the Year.

Prior to the 2020–21 season, Mihalich took a temporary leave of absence to deal with an unspecified medical issue. He wound up missing the entire season, with Farrelly assuming interim head coaching duties. On March 19, 2021, the school announced that Mihalich would not return as head coach and will transition into a new role as special advisor to the director of athletics. Mihalich later revealed that he suffered a stroke in the summer of 2020.

== Head coaching record ==
Record table
Season	Team	Overall	Conference	Standing	Postseason
Niagara Purple Eagles (Metro Atlantic Athletic Conference) (1998–2013)
1998–99	Niagara	17–12	13–5	1st	
1999–2000	Niagara	17–12	10–8	4th	
2000–01	Niagara	15–13	12–6	2nd	
2001–02	Niagara	18–14	10–6	4th	
2002–03	Niagara	17–12	12–6	4th	
2003–04	Niagara	22–10	13–5	2nd	NIT First Round
2004–05	Niagara	20–10	13–5	1st	NCAA Division I Round of 64
2005–06	Niagara	11–18	7–11	7th	
2006–07	Niagara	23–12	13–5	2nd	NCAA Division I Round of 64
2007–08	Niagara	19–10	12–6	3rd	
2008–09	Niagara	26–9	14–4	2nd	NIT First Round
2009–10	Niagara	18–15	9–9	6th	
2010–11	Niagara	9–23	5–13	8th	
2011–12	Niagara	14–19	8–10	7th	
2012–13	Niagara	19–14	13–5	1st	NIT First Round
Niagara:		265–203 (.566)	164–104 (.612)		
Hofstra Pride (Colonial Athletic Association) (2013–2021)
2013–14	Hofstra	10–23	5–11	8th	
2014–15	Hofstra	20–14	10–8	5th	CBI First Round
2015–16	Hofstra	24–10	14–4	1st	NIT First Round
2016–17	Hofstra	15–17	7–11	T–7th	
2017–18	Hofstra	19–12	12–6	3rd	
2018–19	Hofstra	27–8	15–3	1st	NIT First Round
2019–20	Hofstra	26–8	14–4	1st	No postseason held
Hofstra:		141–92 (.605)	77–54 (.588)		
Total:		406–295 (.579)			
National champion Postseason invitational champion Conference regular season champion Conference regular season and conference tournament champion Division regular season champion Division regular season and conference tournament champion Conference tournament champion
