= 2004–05 Niagara Purple Eagles men's basketball team =

American college basketball season

2004–05 Niagara Purple Eagles men's basketball
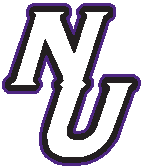

NCAA Tournament, Round of 64
- Conference: Metro Atlantic Athletic Conference
- Record: 20–10 (13–5 MAAC)
- Head coach: Joe Mihalich (7th season)
- Home arena: Gallagher Center

2004–05 MAAC men's basketball standings
	Conf.				Overall
Team	W		L	PCT	W		L	PCT
Niagara †	13	–	5	.722	20	–	10	.667
Rider	13	–	5	.722	19	–	11	.633
Fairfield	11	–	7	.611	15	–	15	.500
Saint Peter's	10	–	8	.556	15	–	13	.536
Iona	9	–	9	.500	15	–	16	.484
Manhattan	9	–	9	.500	15	–	14	.517
Canisius	8	–	10	.444	11	–	18	.379
Marist	8	–	10	.444	11	–	17	.393
Loyola (MD)	5	–	13	.278	6	–	22	.214
Siena	4	–	14	.222	6	–	24	.200
† 2005 MAAC tournament winner Rankings from AP Poll

The 2004–05 Niagara Purple Eagles men's basketball team represented Niagara University during the 2004–05 NCAA Division I men's basketball season. The Purple Eagles, led by seventh-year head coach Joe Mihalich, played their home games at the Gallagher Center in Lewiston, New York as members of the Metro Atlantic Athletic Conference. They finished the season 20–10, 13–5 in MAAC play to finish in first place. They defeated Iona and Rider to win the MAAC tournament and secure the conference's automatic bid to the NCAA Tournament as the No. 14 seed in the South region. The Purple Eagles were beaten by No. 3 seed Oklahoma, 84–67, in the opening round.

== Roster ==
2004–05 Niagara Purple Eagles men's basketball team
Players
Coaches

Pos.	#	Name	Height	Weight	Year	Hometown
F	24	Charron Fisher	6 ft 3 in (1.91 m)	230 lb (104 kg)	Fr	Pennsauken, New Jersey
F	33	Clif Brown	6 ft 7 in (2.01 m)	225 lb (102 kg)	So	Ferndale, Michigan

Head coach

- Joe Mihalich

Assistant coach(es)

Legend

- (C) Team captain
- (S) Suspended
- (I) Ineligible
- (W) Walk-on
- Injured
- Current redshirt

Roster

== Schedule and results ==
Date time, TV	Rank^{#}	Opponent^{#}	Result	Record	Site (attendance) city, state
Regular season
Nov 16, 2004*		at Providence	L 78–83	0–1	Dunkin Donuts Center; Providence, Rhode Island
Nov 27, 2004*		St. John's	W 102–81	3–1	Gallagher Center (2,400); Niagara, New York
MAAC tournament
Mar 6, 2005*		vs. Iona; Semifinals	W 69–66	19–9	HSBC Arena; Buffalo, New York
Mar 7, 2005*		vs. Rider; Championship game	W 81–59	20–9	HSBC Arena; Buffalo, New York
NCAA tournament
Mar 17, 2005*	(14 S)	vs. (3 S) No. 17 Oklahoma; First round	L 67–84	20–10	McKale Center; Tucson, Arizona
*Non-conference game. ^{#}Rankings from AP Poll. (#) Tournament seedings in parentheses. S=South. All times are in Eastern Time.
