= Greg Francis =

Canadian Olympic basketball player and coach (1974–2023)

Biographical details
- Born: April 4, 1974; Toronto, Ontario, Canada
- Died: April 2, 2023 (aged 48)

Playing career
- 1994–1997: Fairfield
- Position: Guard

Coaching career (HC unless noted)
- 2005–2011: Canadian Junior National Team
- 2009–2012: Alberta Golden Bears
- 2012–2015: Waterloo Warriors
- 2015–: Canada Basketball Technical Director
- 2018–2022: Ontario Tech Ridgebacks

Accomplishments and honors

Awards
- As player: Second-team All-MAAC (1996); MAAC tournament MVP (1997)

Greg Francis (April 4, 1974 – April 2, 2023) was a Canadian Olympic basketball player and coach. He was the director of Sport Development with Ontario Basketball, and also served as the manager of Men's High-Performance at Canada Basketball, as well as holding head coach roles with the UOIT Ridgebacks, University of Waterloo Warriors men's basketball team, and the head coach of the University of Alberta Golden Bears, where he replaced coach Don Horwood, who had manned the Bears bench for 26 seasons. Francis was also the head coach of the Canadian junior men’s national team, assistant coach of the Canadian senior men's national team, and the Canadian men's basketball national coach.

Francis was a member of the Canada national team, that finished seventh in the 2000 Summer Olympics in Sydney, Australia and fourth at the 2003 Tournament of the Americas.

== Collegiate career ==
Francis played for the Fairfield University basketball team from 1994 to 1997, finishing his career with 1,570 points, ranking fifth all-time at the school. He also holds the school record for most three-point field goal shots made in a career with 230. During his senior season, he helped lead the Stags to the Metro Atlantic Athletic Conference title and the 1997 NCAA Division I men's basketball tournament.

Francis almost single-handedly upset the North Carolina Tar Heels in the first round of the tournament scoring 26 points including eight three-pointers. Following the game, North Carolina coach Dean Smith said "I had to find Francis after the game but I couldn't shake his hand because it was so hot."

Fairfield recognized his accomplishments in 2003 when the school inducted Francis into its Athletic Hall of Fame.

== Professional career ==
Francis played professionally in the British Basketball League for the Worthing Bears and was selected to the UK All-Star Team during the 1997–98 season and the Chester Jets during the 1999–00 season.

== Death ==
Greg died on April 2, 2023, two days before his 49th birthday.
