= Marist Red Foxes men's basketball statistical leaders =

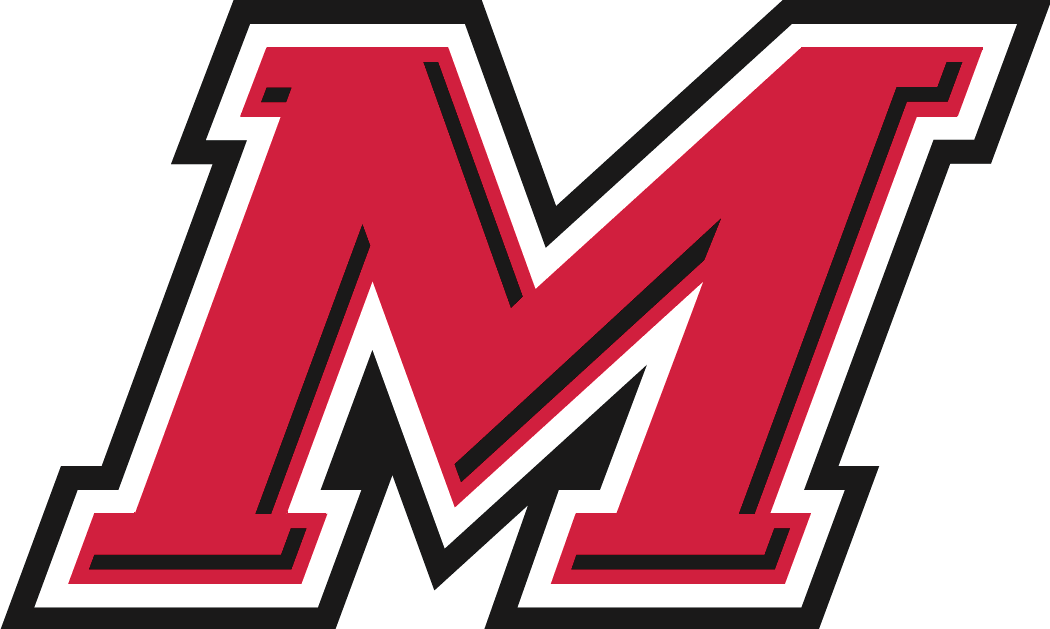

The Marist Red Foxes men's basketball statistical leaders are individual statistical leaders of the Marist Red Foxes men's basketball program in various categories, including points, rebounds, assists, steals, and blocks. Within those areas, the lists identify single-game, single-season, and career leaders. The Red Foxes represent Marist College in the NCAA Division I Metro Conference.

Marist began competing in intercollegiate basketball in 1961. The NCAA did not officially record assists as a stat until the 1983–84 season, and blocks and steals until the 1985–86 season, but Marist's record books includes players in these stats before these seasons. These lists are updated through the end of the 2021–22 season. Active players in 'bold italics'.

== Scoring ==
Career
| Rk | Player | Points | Seasons |
|---|---|---|---|
| 1 | Chavaughn Lewis | 2,119 | 2011–12 2012–13 2013–14 2014–15 |
| 2 | Steve Smith | 2,077 | 1979–80 1980–81 1981–82 1982–83 |
| 3 | Rik Smits | 1,945 | 1984–85 1985–86 1986–87 1987–88 |
| 4 | Khallid Hart | 1,879 | 2013–14 2014–15 2015–16 2016–17 |
| 5 | Brian Parker | 1,822 | 2015–16 2016–17 2017–18 2018–19 |
| 6 | Izett Buchanan | 1,593 | 1990–91 1991–92 1992–93 1993–94 |
| 7 | Will Whittington | 1,586 | 2003–04 2004–05 2005–06 2006–07 |
| 8 | Danny Basile | 1,555 | 1992–93 1993–94 1994–95 1995–96 |
| 9 | Jared Jordan | 1,538 | 2003–04 2004–05 2005–06 2006–07 |
| 10 | Alan Tomidy | 1,508 | 1992–93 1993–94 1994–95 1995–96 |

Season
| Rk | Player | Points | Season |
|---|---|---|---|
| 1 | Izett Buchanan | 685 | 1993–94 |
| 2 | Rik Smits | 668 | 1987–88 |
| 3 | Patrick Gardner | 631 | 2022–23 |
| 4 | Will Whittington | 597 | 2006–07 |
| 5 | Chavaughn Lewis | 596 | 2014–15 |
| 6 | Steve Smith | 592 | 1982–83 |
| 7 | Khallid Hart | 573 | 2016–17 |
| 8 | Khallid Hart | 569 | 2015–16 |
| 9 | Jared Jordan | 566 | 2006–07 |
| 10 | Miroslav Pecarski | 548 | 1988–89 |

Single game
| Rk | Player | Points | Season | Opponent |
|---|---|---|---|---|
| 1 | Izett Buchanan | 51 | 1993–94 | LIU |

== Rebounds ==
Career
| Rk | Player | Rebounds | Seasons |
|---|---|---|---|
| 1 | Ted Taylor | 923 | 1981–82 1982–83 1983–84 1984–85 |
| 2 | Alan Tomidy | 838 | 1992–93 1993–94 1994–95 1995–96 |
| 3 | Adam Kemp | 825 | 2010–11 2011–12 2012–13 2013–14 |
| 4 | Rik Smits | 811 | 1984–85 1985–86 1986–87 1987–88 |
| 5 | Miroslav Pecarski | 655 | 1985–86 1986–87 1988–89 |
| 6 | Ryan Stilphen | 654 | 2004–05 2005–06 2006–07 2007–08 |
| 7 | Chavaughn Lewis | 636 | 2011–12 2012–13 2013–14 2014–15 |
| 8 | Kareem Hill | 627 | 1992–93 1993–94 1994–95 1995–96 |
| 9 | Jaden Daughtry | 617 | 2022–23 2023–24 2024–25 2025–26 |
| 10 | Izett Buchanan | 613 | 1990–91 1991–92 1992–93 1993–94 |

Season
| Rk | Player | Rebounds | Season |
|---|---|---|---|
| 1 | Alan Tomidy | 329 | 1995–96 |
| 2 | Ted Taylor | 297 | 1983–84 |
| 3 | Ryan Schneider | 271 | 2008–09 |
| 4 | Adam Kemp | 268 | 2012–13 |
| | Kareem Hill | 268 | 1995–96 |
| 6 | Izett Buchanan | 255 | 1993–94 |
| 7 | Miroslav Pecarski | 254 | 1988–89 |
| 8 | Ted Taylor | 243 | 1984–85 |
| 9 | Rik Smits | 242 | 1985–86 |
| 10 | Adam Kemp | 231 | 2011–12 |

Single game
| Rk | Player | Rebounds | Season | Opponent |
|---|---|---|---|---|
| 1 | Alan Tomidy | 22 | 1995–96 | LIU |

== Assists ==
Career
| Rk | Player | Assists | Seasons |
|---|---|---|---|
| 1 | Jared Jordan | 813 | 2003–04 2004–05 2005–06 2006–07 |
| 2 | Drafton Davis | 804 | 1984–85 1985–86 1986–87 1987–88 |
| 3 | Sean Kennedy | 670 | 1998–99 1999–00 2000–01 2001–02 |
| 4 | Bruce Johnson | 658 | 1981–82 1982–83 1983–84 1984–85 |
| 5 | Dexter Dunbar | 455 | 1990–91 1991–92 1992–93 1994–95 |
| 6 | Brian Parker | 386 | 2015–16 2016–17 2017–18 2018–19 |
| 7 | Bobby Joe Hatton | 365 | 1995–96 1996–97 1997–98 1998–99 |
| 8 | Danny Basile | 341 | 1992–93 1993–94 1994–95 1995–96 |
| 9 | Joey O'Connor | 326 | 1987–88 1988–89 1989–90 |
| 10 | Chavaughn Lewis | 308 | 2011–12 2012–13 2013–14 2014–15 |

Season
| Rk | Player | Assists | Season |
|---|---|---|---|
| 1 | Jared Jordan | 286 | 2006–07 |
| 2 | Drafton Davis | 248 | 1985–86 |
| 3 | Jared Jordan | 247 | 2005–06 |
| 4 | Drafton Davis | 227 | 1986–87 |
| 5 | Sean Kennedy | 222 | 2001–02 |
| 6 | Sean Kennedy | 219 | 2000–01 |
| 7 | Drafton Davis | 207 | 1987–88 |
| 8 | Bruce Johnson | 194 | 1981–82 |
| 9 | Jared Jordan | 169 | 2004–05 |
| 10 | Bruce Johnson | 165 | 1982–83 |

Single game
| Rk | Player | Assists | Season | Opponent |
|---|---|---|---|---|
| 1 | Sean Kennedy | 17 | 2001–02 | Saint Peter's |

== Steals ==
Career
| Rk | Player | Steals | Seasons |
|---|---|---|---|
| 1 | Drafton Davis | 301 | 1984–85 1985–86 1986–87 1987–88 |
| 2 | Bruce Johnson | 299 | 1981–82 1982–83 1983–84 1984–85 |
| 3 | Chavaughn Lewis | 243 | 2011–12 2012–13 2013–14 2014–15 |
| 4 | Sean Kennedy | 212 | 1998–99 1999–00 2000–01 2001–02 |
| 5 | Dexter Dunbar | 182 | 1990–91 1991–92 1992–93 1994–95 |
| 6 | Jared Jordan | 160 | 2003–04 2004–05 2005–06 2006–07 |
| 7 | Rick Smith | 145 | 1998–99 1999–00 2000–01 2001–02 |
| 8 | Joey O'Connor | 140 | 1987–88 1988–89 1989–90 |
| 9 | Khallid Hart | 138 | 2013–14 2014–15 2015–16 2016–17 |
| 10 | Izett Buchanan | 137 | 1990–91 1991–92 1992–93 1993–94 |
| | Jaden Daughtry | 137 | 2022–23 2023–24 2024–25 2025–26 |

Season
| Rk | Player | Steals | Season |
|---|---|---|---|
| 1 | Drafton Davis | 88 | 1986–87 |
| 2 | Bruce Johnson | 83 | 1984–85 |
| 3 | Bruce Johnson | 81 | 1982–83 |
| 4 | Drafton Davis | 79 | 1985–86 |
| 5 | Drafton Davis | 71 | 1987–88 |
| 6 | Bruce Johnson | 68 | 1981–82 |
| 7 | Chavaughn Lewis | 67 | 2014–15 |
| | Bruce Johnson | 67 | 1983–84 |
| 9 | Rick Smith | 66 | 2000–01 |
| | John Kijonek | 66 | 1988–89 |

Single game
| Rk | Player | Steals | Season | Opponent |
|---|---|---|---|---|
| 1 | Drafton Davis | 9 | 1987–88 | Robert Morris |

== Blocks ==
Career
| Rk | Player | Blocks | Seasons |
|---|---|---|---|
| 1 | Rik Smits | 345 | 1984–85 1985–86 1986–87 1987–88 |
| 2 | Alan Tomidy | 267 | 1992–93 1993–94 1994–95 1995–96 |
| 3 | Adam Kemp | 225 | 2010–11 2011–12 2012–13 2013–14 |
| 4 | Tom Kenney | 139 | 1996–97 1997–98 1998–99 1999–00 |
| 5 | John Donovan | 116 | 1982–83 1983–84 |
| 6 | Jaden Daughtry | 97 | 2022–23 2023–24 2024–25 2025–26 |
| 7 | Kareem Hill | 94 | 1992–93 1993–94 1994–95 1995–96 |
| 8 | Jordan Jones | 94 | 2019–20 2020–21 2021–22 |
| 9 | Tobias Sjoberg | 83 | 2016–17 2017–18 2018–19 2019–20 |
| 10 | Miroslav Pecarski | 78 | 1985–86 1986–87 1988–89 |

Season
| Rk | Player | Blocks | Season |
|---|---|---|---|
| 1 | Alan Tomidy | 113 | 1995–96 |
| 2 | Rik Smits | 105 | 1984–85 |
| 3 | Rik Smits | 83 | 1986–87 |
| 4 | Rik Smits | 82 | 1985–86 |
| 5 | Alan Tomidy | 75 | 1994–95 |
| | Rik Smits | 75 | 1984–85 |
| 7 | John Donovan | 74 | 1983–84 |
| 8 | Adam Kemp | 70 | 2011–12 |
| 9 | Adam Kemp | 68 | 2012–13 |
| 10 | Adam Kemp | 58 | 2013–14 |

Single game
| Rk | Player | Blocks | Season | Opponent |
|---|---|---|---|---|
| 1 | Alan Tomidy | 11 | 1995–96 | LIU |
