= 2011 New York state high school boys basketball championships =

The 2011 Federation Tournament of Champions took place at the Times Union Center in downtown Albany on March 25, 26 and 27. It was the tournament's first year in Albany after 30 years in Glens Falls. Federation championships were awarded in the AA, A and B classifications. Mount Vernon won the Class AA championship. Jabarie Hinds of Mount Vernon was named the Class AA tournament's Most Valuable Player.

== Class AA ==
Participating teams, results and individual honors in Class AA were as follows:

=== Participating teams ===
Association	Team	Record	Appearance	Last appearance	How qualified
CHSAA	Christ the King (Middle Village)	22-6	7	2010	Defeated Rice (NYC), 60-57
NYSPHSAA	Mount Vernon	21-5	9	2007	Defeated Jamestown, 62-51
PSAL	Boys and Girls (Brooklyn)	24-6	3	2010	Defeated Abraham Lincoln (Brooklyn), 62-55

=== Results ===
Semifinal; March 26			Championship Game; March 27
			CHSAA	Christ the King (Middle Village)	78 (OT)
NYSPHSAA	Mount Vernon	70	NYSPHSAA	Mount Vernon	84
PSAL	Boys and Girls (Brooklyn)	63

Mount Vernon finished the season with a 23-5 record.

=== Individual honors ===
The following players were awarded individual honors for their performances at the Federation Tournament:

==== Most Valuable Player ====
- Jabarie Hinds, Mount Vernon

==== All-Tournament Team ====
- Omar Calhoun, Christ the King
- Isaiah Cousins, Mount Vernon
- Chris Ortiz, Christ the King
- Khalid Samuels, Mount Vernon
- Mike Taylor, Boys and Girls

==== Sportsmanship Award ====
- T.J. Curry, Christ the King

== Class A ==
Participating teams, results and individual honors in Class A were as follows:

=== Participating teams ===
Association	Team	Record	Appearance	Last appearance	How qualified
CHSAA	St. Mary’s (Manhasset)	28-0	4	2002	Defeated Mount Saint Michael (Bronx), 63-56
NYSAISAA	Long Island Lutheran (Brookville)	21-4	23	2010	Only school in classification
NYSPHSAA	Jamesville-DeWitt	22-3	5	2010	Defeated Harborfields, 66-51
PSAL	Midwood (Brooklyn)	28-3	1	(first)	Defeated Long Island City, 60-49

=== Results ===
Semifinals; March 25
NYSPHSAA	Jamesville-DeWitt	71
NYSAISAA	Long Island Lutheran (Brookville)	75
CHSAA	St. Mary’s (Manhasset)	67
PSAL	Midwood (Brooklyn)	44

Championship Game; March 26
NYSAISAA	Long Island Lutheran (Brookville)	78
NYSPHSAA	St. Mary’s (Manhasset)	51

Long Island Lutheran finished the season with a 23-4 record.

=== Individual honors ===
The following players were awarded individual honors for their performances at the Federation Tournament:

==== Most Valuable Player ====
- Achraf Yacoubou, Long Island Lutheran

==== All-Tournament Team ====
- DaJuan Coleman, Jamesville-DeWitt
- Mike Florin, Long Island Lutheran
- Shaun Lawton, Long Island Lutheran
- Chavaughn Lewis, St. Mary's
- Enees Nikovic, Midwood

==== Sportsmanship Award ====
- Charles McCann, St. Mary's

== Class B ==
Participating teams, results and individual honors in Class B were as follows:

=== Participating teams ===
Association	Team	Record	Appearance	Last appearance	How qualified
NYSPHSAA	Burke Catholic (Goshen)	23-2	1	(first)	Defeated Potsdam, 62-52
NYSAISAA	Collegiate (NYC)	20-8	6	2010	Defeated Poly Prep (Brooklyn), 57-47
CHSAA	Salesian (New Rochelle)	21-7	4	1999	Defeated St. Mary's (Lancaster), 83-50
PSAL	Pathways (St. Albans)	24-4	1	(first)	Defeated Frederick Douglass Academy III (Bronx), 59-52 (OT)

=== Results ===
Semifinals; March 25
NYSPHSAA	Burke Catholic (Goshen)	55
NYSAISAA	Collegiate (NYC)	71
CHSAA	Salesian (New Rochelle)	86
PSAL	Pathways (St. Albans)	64

Championship Game; March 26
NYSAISAA	Collegiate (NYC)	48
CHSAA	Salesian (New Rochelle)	46

Collegiate finished the season with a 22-8 record. It was Collegiate's record fourth straight state title.

=== Individual honors ===
The following players were awarded individual honors for their performances at the Federation Tournament:

==== Most Valuable Player ====
- Connor Huff, Collegiate

==== All-Tournament Team ====
- Ryan Frankel, Collegiate
- Kevin Punter, Salesian
- Zach Ruffer, Burke Catholic
- Jordan Washington, Pathways
- Rob Wechsler, Collegiate

==== Sportsmanship Award ====
- Jason Alleyne, Salesian
