= 2006–07 Florida A&M Rattlers basketball team =

American college basketball season

2006–07 Florida A&M Rattlers basketball
- Conference: Mid-Eastern Athletic Conference
- Record: 21–14 (12–6 MEAC)
- Head coach: Mike Gillespie (3rd season)
- Home arena: Jake Gaither Gymnasium

2006–07 MEAC men's basketball standings
	Conf.				Overall
Team	W		L	PCT	W		L	PCT
Delaware State	16	–	2	.889	21	–	13	.618
Florida A&M †	12	–	6	.667	21	–	14	.600
Hampton	10	–	8	.556	15	–	16	.484
North Carolina A&T	10	–	8	.556	15	–	17	.469
South Carolina State	10	–	8	.556	13	–	17	.433
Morgan State	10	–	8	.556	13	–	18	.419
Norfolk State	10	–	8	.556	11	–	19	.367
Coppin State	9	–	9	.500	12	–	20	.375
Bethune–Cookman	6	–	12	.333	9	–	21	.300
Howard	5	–	13	.278	9	–	22	.290
Maryland Eastern Shore	1	–	17	.056	4	–	27	.129
† 2007 MEAC tournament winner

The 2006–07 Florida A&M Rattlers men's basketball team represented Florida A&M University during the 2006–07 NCAA Division I men's basketball season. The Rattlers, led by third-year head coach Mike Gillespie, played their home games at the Teaching Gym as members of the Mid-Eastern Athletic Conference. They finished the season 21–14, 12–6 in MEAC play to finish in a tie for 2nd place. They won the MEAC tournament to secure the conference's automatic bid to the NCAA Tournament as one of two 16 seeds in the West region. The Rattlers tipped off tournament action in the Play-in Game against Niagara and were defeated by the Purple Eagles, 77–69.

== Roster ==
2006–07 Florida A&M Rattlers men's basketball team
Players
Coaches

Pos.	#	Name	Height	Weight	Year	Hometown
G	23	Brian Greene	6 ft 5 in (1.96 m)	210 lb (95 kg)	Sr	Jacksonville, Florida
C	32	Rome Sanders	6 ft 8 in (2.03 m)	240 lb (109 kg)	Sr	Chicago, Illinois

Head coach

- Mike Gillespie

Assistant coach(es)

Legend

- (C) Team captain
- (S) Suspended
- (I) Ineligible
- (W) Walk-on
- Injured
- Current redshirt

Roster

== Schedule and results ==
Date time, TV	Rank^{#}	Opponent^{#}	Result	Record	Site (attendance) city, state
Non-conference regular season
Nov 12, 2006*; 7:00 pm		Maryland	L 54–93	0–1	Comcast Center (17,950); College Park, Maryland
Nov 14, 2006*		Warner	W 88–61	1–1	Jake Gaither Gymnasium; Tallahassee, Florida
Nov 17, 2006*		at Miami (OH)	L 33–52	1–2	Millett Hall; Oxford, Ohio
Nov 19, 2006*; 5:00 pm		at Illinois	L 63–84	1–3	Assembly Hall (16,618); Champaign, Illinois
Nov 21, 2006*		at Bradley	L 75–107	1–4	Carver Arena; Peoria, Illinois
Nov 24, 2006*		vs. Illinois-Chicago	L 57–75	1–5	
Nov 25, 2006*		vs. Savannah State	W 74–65	2–5	
Dec 2, 2006		Bethune-Cookman	W 83–73	3–5 (1–0)	Jake Gaither Gymnasium; Tallahassee, Florida
Dec 7, 2006*		Edward Waters	W 76–61	4–5	Jake Gaither Gymnasium; Tallahassee, Florida
Dec 9, 2006*		Albany State	W 96–87	5–5	Jake Gaither Gymnasium; Tallahassee, Florida
Dec 17, 2006*; 6:00 pm		vs. No. 5 Florida	L 57–72	5–6	St. Pete Times Forum; Tampa, Florida
Dec 20, 2006*		at North Florida	W 66–65	6–6	UNF Arena; Jacksonville, Florida
Dec 30, 2006*		at No. 10 Pittsburgh	L 51–77	6–7	Petersen Events Center; Pittsburgh, Pennsylvania
MEAC regular season
Jan 3, 2007		at Morgan State	W 62–59	7–7 (2–0)	Talmadge L. Hill Field House; Baltimore, Maryland
Jan 6, 2007		Norfolk State	W 81–71	8–7 (3–0)	Jake Gaither Gymnasium; Tallahassee, Florida
Jan 8, 2007		Hampton	L 74–76	8–8 (3–1)	Jake Gaither Gymnasium; Tallahassee, Florida
Jan 13, 2007		South Carolina State	W 73–58	9–8 (4–1)	Jake Gaither Gymnasium; Tallahassee, Florida
Jan 15, 2007		North Carolina A&T	L 78–82	9–9 (4–2)	Jake Gaither Gymnasium; Tallahassee, Florida
Jan 20, 2007		at Maryland-Eastern Shore	W 65–55	10–9 (5–2)	Hytche Athletic Center; Princess Anne, Maryland
Jan 22, 2007		at Howard	W 65–53	11–9 (6–2)	Burr Gymnasium; Washington, D.C.
Jan 27, 2007		Delaware State	W 73–69	12–9 (7–2)	Jake Gaither Gymnasium; Tallahassee, Florida
Jan 29, 2007*		Winston-Salem State	W 83–68	13–9	Jake Gaither Gymnasium; Tallahassee, Florida
Feb 3, 2007		at Norfolk State	L 68–81	13–10 (7–3)	Joseph G. Echols Memorial Hall; Norfolk, Virginia
Feb 5, 2007		at Hampton	L 72–74 ^{OT}	13–11 (7–4)	Hampton Convocation Center; Hampton, Virginia
Feb 10, 2007		at South Carolina State	W 72–69 ^{OT}	14–11 (8–4)	SHM Memorial Center; Orangeburg, South Carolina
Feb 12, 2007		at North Carolina A&T	L 82–90	14–12 (8–5)	Corbett Sports Center; Greensboro, North Carolina
Feb 17, 2007		Maryland-Eastern Shore	W 93–60	15–12 (9–5)	Jake Gaither Gymnasium; Tallahassee, Florida
Feb 19, 2007		Howard	W 85–75	16–12 (10–5)	Jake Gaither Gymnasium; Tallahassee, Florida
Feb 24, 2007		at Delaware State	L 65–77	16–13 (10–6)	Memorial Hall; Dover, Delaware
Feb 28, 2007		Coppin State	W 73–59	17–13 (11–6)	Jake Gaither Gymnasium; Tallahassee, Florida
Mar 3, 2007		at Bethune-Cookman	W 68–62 ^{OT}	18–13 (12–6)	Moore Gymnasium; Daytona Beach, Florida
MEAC tournament
Mar 7, 2007*	(2)	vs. (7) Hampton; Quarterfinals	W 61–58	19–13	RBC Center; Raleigh, North Carolina
Mar 9, 2007*	(2)	vs. (3) North Carolina A&T; Semifinals	W 74–66	20–13	RBC Center; Raleigh, North Carolina
Mar 10, 2007*	(2)	vs. (1) Delaware State; Championship game	W 58–56	21–13	RBC Center; Raleigh, North Carolina
NCAA tournament
Mar 13, 2007*	(16 W)	vs. (16 W) Niagara; Play-in Game	L 69–77	21–14	UD Arena; Dayton, Ohio
*Non-conference game. ^{#}Rankings from AP Poll. (#) Tournament seedings in parentheses. W=West. All times are in Eastern Time.
