= 2006–07 Niagara Purple Eagles men's basketball team =

American college basketball season

2006–07 Niagara Purple Eagles men's basketball
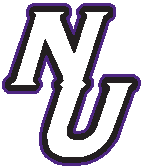

NCAA Tournament, Round of 64
- Conference: Metro Atlantic Athletic Conference
- Record: 23–12 (13–5 MAAC)
- Head coach: Joe Mihalich (9th season)
- Home arena: Gallagher Center

2006–07 MAAC men's basketball standings
	Conf.				Overall
Team	W		L	PCT	W		L	PCT
Marist	14	–	4	.778	25	–	9	.735
Niagara †	13	–	5	.722	23	–	12	.657
Loyola (MD)	12	–	6	.667	18	–	13	.581
Siena	12	–	6	.667	20	–	12	.625
Manhattan	10	–	8	.556	13	–	17	.433
Fairfield	10	–	8	.556	13	–	19	.406
Rider	9	–	9	.500	16	–	15	.516
Canisius	6	–	12	.333	12	–	19	.387
Saint Peter's	3	–	15	.167	5	–	25	.167
Iona	1	–	17	.056	2	–	28	.067
† 2007 MAAC tournament winner Rankings from AP Poll

The 2006–07 Niagara Purple Eagles men's basketball team represented Niagara University during the 2006–07 NCAA Division I men's basketball season. The Purple Eagles, led by ninth-year head coach Joe Mihalich, played their home games at the Gallagher Center in Lewiston, New York as members of the Metro Atlantic Athletic Conference. They finished the season 23–12, 13–5 in MAAC play to finish in second place. They defeated Rider, Loyola, and Siena to win the MAAC tournament and secure the conference's automatic bid to the NCAA Tournament as one of two 16 seeds in the West region. The Purple Eagles defeated Florida A&M, 77–69, in the Play-in Game to reach the field of 64 where No. 1 seed Kansas dominated Niagara by the score of 107–67.

== Roster ==
2006–07 Niagara Purple Eagles men's basketball team
Players
Coaches

Pos.	#	Name	Height	Weight	Year	Hometown
G	1	Lorenzo Miles	5 ft 11 in (1.8 m)	190 lb (86 kg)	Sr	Washington, D.C.
G	2	Stanley Hodge	6 ft 1 in (1.85 m)	190 lb (86 kg)	Jr	Washington, D.C.
G	5	Andrew Patterson	6 ft 5 in (1.96 m)	195 lb (88 kg)	Fr	Hartford, CT
G	12	Javonte Clanton	6 ft 0 in (1.83 m)	185 lb (84 kg)	Fr	Reynoldsburg, OH
F	13	J.R. Duffey	6 ft 8 in (2.03 m)	220 lb (100 kg)	Sr	Fort Worth, TX
C	15	Benson Egemonye	6 ft 10 in (2.08 m)	230 lb (104 kg)	So	Benin City, Nigeria
G	20	Tyrone Lewis	6 ft 0 in (1.83 m)	180 lb (82 kg)	Fr	Levittown, PA
F	24	Charron Fisher	6 ft 3 in (1.91 m)	230 lb (104 kg)	Jr	Pennsauken, NJ
F	32	Kamau Gordon	6 ft 7 in (2.01 m)	260 lb (118 kg)	Fr	Greenwich, CT
F	33	Clif Brown	6 ft 7 in (2.01 m)	225 lb (102 kg)	Sr	Ferndale, MI
F	35	Greg Noel	6 ft 7 in (2.01 m)	210 lb (95 kg)	Sr	Montreal, Canada

Head coach

- Joe Mihalich

Assistant coach(es)

Legend

- (C) Team captain
- (S) Suspended
- (I) Ineligible
- (W) Walk-on
- Injured
- Current redshirt

Roster

== Schedule and results ==
Date time, TV	Rank^{#}	Opponent^{#}	Result	Record	Site (attendance) city, state
Regular season
Nov 16, 2006*		Binghamton	L 66–74	0–1	Gallagher Center (1,624); Lewiston, NY
Nov 18, 2006*		Valparaiso	L 58–70	0–2	Gallagher Center (1,871); Lewiston, NY
Nov 25, 2006*		Akron	L 48–63	0–3	Gallagher Center (1,183); Lewiston, NY
Nov 29, 2006*		at St. Bonaventure	W 74–63	1–3	Reilly Center (4,216); Olean, NY
Dec 2, 2006*		at Buffalo	L 62–74	1–4	Alumni Arena (5,024); Buffalo, NY
Dec 6, 2006		at Siena	L 69–81	1–5 (0–1)	Pepsi Arena (5,013); Albany, NY
Dec 9, 2006*		St. Johns's	L 64–86	1–6	Gallagher Center (1,869); Lewiston, NY
Dec 16, 2006*		Duquesne	W 78–74	2–6	Gallagher Center (1,022); Lewiston, NY
Dec 19, 2006		at Iona	W 79–58	3–6 (1–1)	Hynes Athletics Center (1,419); New Rochelle, NY
Dec 23, 2006*		Central Michigan	W 80–73	4–6	Rose Center (1,215); Mount Pleasant, MI
Dec 28, 2006*		vs. Delaware	L 53–71	4–7	Tom Gola Arena (1,837); Philadelphia, PA
Dec 29, 2006*		vs. Holy Cross	W 67–61	5–7	Tom Gola Arena (1,531); Philadelphia, PA
Dec 30, 2006*		at La Salle	W 88–82	6–7	Tom Gola Arena (2,522); Philadelphia, PA
Jan 3, 2007		Saint Peter's	W 88–55	7–7 (2–1)	Gallagher Center (1,515); Lewiston, NY
Jan 5, 2007		Siena	L 81–92	7–8 (2–2)	Gallagher Center (1,493); Lewiston, NY
Jan 9, 2007		Fairfield	W 85–76	8–8 (3–2)	Gallagher Center (1,301); Lewiston, NY
Jan 12, 2007		at Loyola (MD)	L 95–96 ^{OT}	8–9 (3–3)	Reitz Arena (2,428); Baltimore, MD
Jan 14, 2007		at Rider	W 80–79	9–9 (4–3)	Alumni Gymnasium (1,214); Lawrenceville, NJ
Jan 18, 2007		Marist	L 86–91 ^{OT}	9–10 (4–4)	Gallagher Center (1,727); Lewiston, NY
Jan 20, 2007		Iona	W 81–80	10–10 (5–4)	Gallagher Center (1,807); Lewiston, NY
Jan 26, 2007		at Marist	W 83–75	11–10 (6–4)	McCann Arena (3,200); Poughkeepsie, NY
Jan 28, 2007		at Fairfield	L 56–68	11–11 (6–5)	Arena at Harbor Yard (2,968); Bridgeport, CT
Feb 2, 2007		Manhattan	W 81–70	12–11 (7–5)	Gallagher Center (1,636); Lewiston, NY
Feb 4, 2007		Canisius	W 79–61	13–11 (8–5)	Gallagher Center (2,400); Lewiston, NY
Feb 9, 2007		at Saint Peter's	W 63–59	14–11 (9–5)	Yanitelli Center (737); Jersey City, NJ
Feb 11, 2007		at Manhattan	W 76–74	15–11 (10–5)	Draddy Gymnasium (2,123); Bronx, NY
Feb 13, 2007		at Canisius	W 89–88 ^{OT}	16–11 (11–5)	Koessler Athletic Center (1,836); Buffalo, NY
Feb 17, 2007*		Liberty	W 90–81	17–11	Gallagher Center (1,639); Lewiston, NY
Feb 23, 2007		Loyola (MD)	W 73–71	18–11 (12–5)	Gallagher Center (1,927); Lewiston, NY
Feb 25, 2007		Rider	W 89–77	19–11 (13–5)	Gallagher Center (2,044); Lewiston, NY
MAAC tournament
Mar 3, 2007*	(2)	vs. (7) Rider; Quarterfinals	W 77–52	20–11	Arena at Harbor Yard (4,172); Bridgeport, CT
Mar 4, 2007*	(2)	vs. (3) Loyola (MD); Semifinals	W 89–79	21–11	Arena at Harbor Yard (3,686); Bridgeport, CT
Mar 5, 2007*	(2)	vs. (1) Siena; Championship	W 83–79	22–11	Arena at Harbor Yard (2,746); Bridgeport, CT
NCAA tournament
Mar 13, 2007*	(16 W)	vs. (16 W) Florida A&M; Play-in Game	W 77–69	23–11	UD Arena (8,257); Dayton, OH
Mar 16, 2007*	(16 W)	vs. (1 W) No. 2 Kansas; First Round	L 67–107	23–12	United Center (19,274); Chicago, IL
*Non-conference game. ^{#}Rankings from AP Poll. (#) Tournament seedings in parentheses. W=West. All times are in Eastern Time.
