= Burke High School =

Burke High School can refer to:

- Omaha Burke High School in Omaha, Nebraska
- Burke High School (South Carolina) in Charleston, South Carolina
- Burke High School (South Dakota) in Burke, South Dakota
- Burke High School (Massachusetts) in Boston, Massachusetts
- John S. Burke Catholic High School ("Burke Catholic"), Goshen, Orange County, New York
