= Mike Maker =

Mike Maker may refer to:

- Michael J. Maker (born 1969), American trainer of Thoroughbred racehorses
- Mike Maker (basketball) (born 1965), American college basketball coach
