= Steve Smith (basketball, born 1961) =

American basketball player

Personal information
- Born: December 7, 1961 (age 64) U.S.
- Listed height: 6 ft 5 in (1.96 m)

Career information
- High school: Woodlands (Hartsdale, New York)
- College: Marist (1979–1983)
- NBA draft: 1983: undrafted
- Position: Guard

Career highlights
- ECAC Metro Player of the Year (1983); First-team All-ECAC Metro (1983); ECAC Rookie of the Year (1980); No. 12 retired by Marist Red Foxes

Steve Smith (born December 7, 1961) is an American former basketball player. He played college basketball for the Marist Red Foxes from 1979 to 1983. Smith was selected as the ECAC Metro Player of the Year during his senior season in 1983.

== Early life ==
Smith was born on December 7, 1961. He attended Woodlands High School in Hartsdale, New York, and played on the basketball team. Smith was lightly recruited by collegiate teams because of a poor junior season and mediocre academic results. He had an improved senior season and was selected for All-County honors. Smith was prepared to play NCAA Division III basketball at Elizabethtown College in 1979 when he was approached by Ron Petro, the head coach of the Marist Red Foxes. Marist was in the process of transitioning to NCAA Division I for the 1981–82 season and Petro pitched Smith as being a vital part of the move. Petro offered Smith the remainder of Marist's scholarship money and promised him a complete athletic scholarship if Smith was to attend.

== College career ==
Smith averaged 19 points per game during his freshman season with the Marist Red Foxes and was selected as the Eastern College Athletic Conference Rookie of the Year. Smith averaged 20.4 points per game during his senior season and was chosen as the ECAC Metro Player of the Year in 1983.

Smith scored a Marist-record 2,077 points during his career; he was the first player to surpass the 2,000-point milestone. Smith averaged 19.4 points and 5.5 rebounds per game during his Marist career.

Smith was inducted into the Metro Conference Honor Roll in 2015.

== Professional career ==
Smith was not selected in the 1983 NBA draft which he described as the "most disappointment I've had in my life." Smith informed his agent that he did not want to attend any National Basketball Association (NBA) camps as an undrafted free agent.

Smith tried out for the Puerto Rico Coquis of the Continental Basketball Association (CBA) in November 1983 but was hampered by an ankle injury on the first day of practice. He was released by the Coquis later in the month. On December 17, 1983, Smith announced that he had given up on playing basketball professionally and would look for a job.

== Personal life ==
Smith moved to Chicago where he worked as a vice president of sales for a beverage distributor as of 2015. He is married and has two children.
