= 2007 MEAC men's basketball tournament =

- Classification: Division I
- Season: 2006–07
- Teams: 11
- Site: RBC Center; Raleigh, North Carolina
- Champions: Florida A&M (4th title)
- Winning coach: Mike Gillespie (4th title)
- MVP: Brian Greene (Florida A&M)
- Attendance: 30,000
- Television: ESPN Classic

2006–07 MEAC men's basketball standings
	Conf.				Overall
Team	W		L	PCT	W		L	PCT
Delaware State	16	–	2	.889	21	–	13	.618
Florida A&M †	12	–	6	.667	21	–	14	.600
Hampton	10	–	8	.556	15	–	16	.484
North Carolina A&T	10	–	8	.556	15	–	17	.469
South Carolina State	10	–	8	.556	13	–	17	.433
Morgan State	10	–	8	.556	13	–	18	.419
Norfolk State	10	–	8	.556	11	–	19	.367
Coppin State	9	–	9	.500	12	–	20	.375
Bethune–Cookman	6	–	12	.333	9	–	21	.300
Howard	5	–	13	.278	9	–	22	.290
Maryland Eastern Shore	1	–	17	.056	4	–	27	.129
† 2007 MEAC tournament winner

The 2007 Mid-Eastern Athletic Conference men's basketball tournament took place on March 6–10, 2007 at the RBC Center in Raleigh, North Carolina. The championship game was televised by ESPN Classic.

== Bracket ==
First round Tuesday-Wednesday, March 6–7
8	Coppin State	56
9	Bethune–Cookman	44
6	Norfolk State	81
11	Maryland Eastern Shore	70
7	Hampton	76
10	Howard	61

Quarterfinals; Wednesday-Thursday, March 7–8
1	Delaware State	68
8	Coppin State	59
4	South Carolina State	64^{OT}
5	Morgan State	66
3	North Carolina A&T	81
6	Norfolk State	66
2	Florida A&M	61
7	Hampton	58

Semifinals; Friday, March 9
1	Delaware State	56
5	Morgan State	53^{OT}
3	North Carolina A&T	66
2	Florida A&M	74

Final; Saturday, March 10
1	Delaware State	56
2	Florida A&M	58
