= 2007 MAAC men's basketball tournament =

- Classification: Division I
- Season: 2006–07
- Teams: 10
- Site: Arena at Harbor Yard; Bridgeport, CT
- Champions: Niagara (2nd title)
- Winning coach: Joe Mihalich (2nd title)
- MVP: Tyrone Lewis (Niagara)

2006–07 MAAC men's basketball standings
	Conf.				Overall
Team	W		L	PCT	W		L	PCT
Marist	14	–	4	.778	25	–	9	.735
Niagara †	13	–	5	.722	23	–	12	.657
Loyola (MD)	12	–	6	.667	18	–	13	.581
Siena	12	–	6	.667	20	–	12	.625
Manhattan	10	–	8	.556	13	–	17	.433
Fairfield	10	–	8	.556	13	–	19	.406
Rider	9	–	9	.500	16	–	15	.516
Canisius	6	–	12	.333	12	–	19	.387
Saint Peter's	3	–	15	.167	5	–	25	.167
Iona	1	–	17	.056	2	–	28	.067
† 2007 MAAC tournament winner Rankings from AP Poll

The 2007 MAAC men's basketball tournament was held March 2–5 at The Arena at Harbor Yard in Bridgeport, CT.

Second-seeded Niagara defeated Siena in the championship game, 83–79, to win their first MAAC men's basketball tournament.

The Purple Eagles received an automatic bid to the 2007 NCAA tournament.

== Format ==
All ten of the conference's members participated in the tournament field. They were seeded based on regular season conference records.

== Bracket ==
First round Friday, March 2
8	Canisius	62
9	Saint Peter's	48
7	Rider	77
10	Iona	62

Quarterfinals; Saturday, March 3
1	Marist	87
8	Canisius	63
4	Siena	75
5	Manhattan	72
2	Niagara	77
7	Rider	52
3	Loyola (MD)	76
6	Fairfield	72

Semifinals; Sunday, March 4
1	Marist	78
4	Siena	86
2	Niagara	89
3	Loyola (MD)	79

Final; Monday, March 5
4	Siena	79
2	Niagara	83
