= 1996 Northeast Conference men's basketball tournament =

- Classification: Division I
- Season: 1995–96
- Teams: 10
- Finals site: William T. Boylan Gymnasium; West Long Branch, NJ
- Champions: Monmouth (1st title)
- Winning coach: Wayne Szoke (1st title)
- MVP: Corey Albano (Monmouth)

The 1996 Northeast Conference men's basketball tournament was held in March. The tournament featured the league's ten teams, seeded based on their conference record. Monmouth won the championship, their first, and received the conference's automatic bid to the 1996 NCAA Tournament.

1995–96 Northeast Conference men's basketball standings
| | Conf. | | | | Overall |
| Team | W | | L | PCT | W | | L | PCT |
|---|---|---|---|---|---|---|---|---|
| Mount St. Mary's | 16 | – | 2 | .889 | 21 | – | 8 | .724 |
| Marist | 14 | – | 4 | .778 | 22 | – | 7 | .759 |
| Monmouth † | 14 | – | 4 | .778 | 20 | – | 10 | .667 |
| Rider | 12 | – | 6 | .667 | 19 | – | 11 | .633 |
| Saint Francis (PA) | 11 | – | 7 | .611 | 13 | – | 14 | .481 |
| Wagner | 7 | – | 11 | .389 | 10 | – | 17 | .370 |
| Fairleigh Dickinson | 6 | – | 12 | .333 | 7 | – | 20 | .259 |
| Long Island | 5 | – | 13 | .278 | 9 | – | 19 | .321 |
| St. Francis Brooklyn | 3 | – | 15 | .167 | 9 | – | 18 | .333 |
| Robert Morris | 2 | – | 16 | .111 | 5 | – | 23 | .179 |
† 1996 NEC tournament winner

== Format ==
The NEC Men's Basketball Tournament consisted of a ten-team playoff format with all games played at the venue of the higher seed. The first round was played by the four lowest seeds (7–10) and the other teams received a bye.

== Bracket ==
First round
8 | Long Island | 82
9 | St. Francis Brooklyn | 63
7 | Fairleigh Dickinson | 80
10 | Robert Morris | 87

Quarterfinals
1 | Mount St. Mary's | 93
9 | Long Island | 58
4 | Rider | 84
5 | Saint Francis (PA) | 70
2 | Marist | 70
10 | Robert Morris | 51
3 | Monmouth | 64
6 | Wagner | 55

Semifinals
1 | Mount St. Mary's | 70
4 | Rider | 74
2 | Marist | 56
3 | Monmouth | 57

Championship Game
4 | Rider | 59
3 | Monmouth | 60

== All-tournament team ==
Tournament MVP in bold.

**1996 NEC All-Tournament Team**

**Corey Albano**, MU
Mustafa Barksdale, MU
Danny Basile, MAR
Deon Hames, RID
Riley Inge, MSM
Charles Smith, RID
