= Corey Albano =

American basketball player

Personal information
- Born: July 28, 1975 (age 51) New York City, New York, U.S.
- Listed height: 6 ft 9 in (2.06 m)
- Listed weight: 194 lb (88 kg)

Career information
- High school: Toms River (Toms River, New Jersey)
- College: Monmouth (1993–1997)
- NBA draft: 1997: undrafted
- Playing career: 1997–2010
- Position: Power forward

Career history
- 1997–1999: Ginásio C.F.
- 1999–2001: Scaligera Verona
- 2001–2002: Panathinaikos
- 2002–2003: Victoria Libertas Pesaro
- 2003–2005: S.S. Basket Napoli
- 2005–2006: Pallacanestro Varese
- 2006–2007: Olympias Patras
- 2007–2008: Gruppo Triboldi Basket
- 2009: Saint-Quentin
- 2009–2010: Toms River Shooters

Career highlights
- EuroLeague champion (2002); 1x Portuguese All-Star (1999)

Corey Albano (born July 28, 1975) is an American-Italian former professional basketball player.

== College career ==
Albano grew up in Toms River, New Jersey played high school basketball at Toms River High School South, graduating in 1993. After high school, he played college basketball at the Monmouth University, where he was a member of the Monmouth Hawks men's basketball team, from 1993 until 1997. In 1996, as a Junior, Albano led the Monmouth Hawks to the school's first ever division 1 NCAA tournament appearance, where after going 20–9 they earned a 13 seed. During that 95–96 season, Albano was the team's leading scorer, averaging 17.2 points per game. The team has been back to the tournament 4 times since Albano led the Hawks there his Junior year.

== Professional career ==
Albano played for Ginásio C.F. in Portugal, Scaligera Verona, Victoria Libertas Pesaro, S.S. Basket Napoli, Pallacanestro Varese and Gruppo Triboldi Basket in Italy, Panathinaikos and Olympias Patras in Greece and Saint-Quentin in France.

While playing with Panathinaikos he won the 2001–02 Euroleague championship.
