= 1995–96 St. Francis Terriers men's basketball team =

American college basketball season

1995–96 St. Francis Terriers men's basketball
- Conference: Northeast Conference
- Record: 9–18 (3–15 NEC)
- Head coach: Ron Ganulin (5th season)
- Assistant coach: Glenn Braica (7th season)
- Home arena: Generoso Pope Athletic Complex

1995–96 Northeast Conference men's basketball standings
	Conf.				Overall
Team	W		L	PCT	W		L	PCT
Mount St. Mary's	16	–	2	.889	21	–	8	.724
Marist	14	–	4	.778	22	–	7	.759
Monmouth †	14	–	4	.778	20	–	10	.667
Rider	12	–	6	.667	19	–	11	.633
Saint Francis (PA)	11	–	7	.611	13	–	14	.481
Wagner	7	–	11	.389	10	–	17	.370
Fairleigh Dickinson	6	–	12	.333	7	–	20	.259
Long Island	5	–	13	.278	9	–	19	.321
St. Francis Brooklyn	3	–	15	.167	9	–	18	.333
Robert Morris	2	–	16	.111	5	–	23	.179
† 1996 NEC tournament winner

The 1995–96 St. Francis Terriers men's basketball team represented St. Francis College during the 1995–96 NCAA Division I men's basketball season. The team was coached by Ron Ganulin, who was in his fifth year at the helm of the St. Francis Terriers. The Terrier's home games were played at the Generoso Pope Athletic Complex. The team has been a member of the Northeast Conference since 1981.

The Terriers finished their season at 9–18 overall and 3–15 in conference play. The Terriers played as the 9th seed in the NEC Tournament and lost in the first round against 8th seed LIU Brooklyn, 63–82.

== Roster ==
1995–96 St. Francis Brooklyn Terriers men's basketball team
Players
Coaches

Pos.	#	Name	Height	Weight	Year	Hometown
C		Marlon Lewis	6 ft 8 in (2.03 m)	—	Sr
F		Chris Ortiz	6 ft 5 in (1.96 m)	—	Sr
G		Robert Bailey	6 ft 1 in (1.85 m)	—	Sr
F		Abdu-Allah Torrence	6 ft 7 in (2.01 m)	—	Jr
F		Danny Manning	6 ft 6 in (1.98 m)	—	Jr
G		Lormont Sharp	6 ft 1 in (1.85 m)	—	So
G		Edwin Caceres	6 ft 1 in (1.85 m)	—	So
G	14	Solomon Abel	5 ft 11 in (1.8 m)	175 lb (79 kg)	So	Bronx, New York
G		Andy Singleton	6 ft 1 in (1.85 m)	—	So
G	32	Tim Rail	6 ft 3 in (1.91 m)	185 lb (84 kg)	Fr	Staten Island, New York
F		Jason Smith	6 ft 7 in (2.01 m)	—	Fr
G		Brenden Floyd	6 ft 2 in (1.88 m)	—	Fr

Head coach

- Ron Ganulin (LIU Brooklyn '67)

Assistant coach(es)

- Glenn Braica (Queens College '89)

Legend

- (C) Team captain
- (S) Suspended
- (I) Ineligible
- (W) Walk-on
- Injured
- Current redshirt

== Schedule and results ==
Date time, TV	Opponent	Result	Record	Site (attendance) city, state
Regular season
November 25, 1995*	Lehigh	W 92–78	1–0	Generoso Pope Athletic Complex (378); Brooklyn, NY
November 27, 1995*	at Delaware State	W 73–68	2–0	Memorial Hall (600); Dover, DE
December 2, 1995*	at Fordham	W 98–95	3–0	Rose Hill Gymnasium (525); Bronx, NY
December 5, 1995*	Morgan State	W 89–69	4–0	Generoso Pope Athletic Complex (348); Brooklyn, NY
December 9, 1995*	vs. Brown	W 56–53	5–0	Yanitelli Center (1,321); Jersey City, NJ
December 10, 1995*	at Saint Peter's	L 69–80	5–1	Yanitelli Center (1,085); Jersey City, NJ
December 12, 1995*	at Maryland Eastern Shore	L 61–63	5–2	J. Millard Tawes Gym (950); Princess Anne, MD
December 30, 1995*	at Army	W 69–52	6–2	Christl Arena (667); West Point, NY
NEC Regular Season
January 6, 1996	at Wagner	L 69–93	6–3 (0–1)	Spiro Sports Center (1,046); Staten Island, NY
January 9, 1996	at Monmouth	L 65–74	6–4 (0–2)	William T. Boylan Gymnasium (463); West Long Branch, NJ
January 11, 1996	Fairleigh Dickinson	L 69–79	6–5 (0–3)	Generoso Pope Athletic Complex (185); Brooklyn, NY
January 13, 1996	Mount St. Mary's	W 60–50	7–5 (1–3)	Generoso Pope Athletic Complex (278); Brooklyn, NY
January 17, 1996	Rider	L 51–70	7–6 (1–4)	Generoso Pope Athletic Complex (306); Brooklyn, NY
January 20, 1996	at Marist	L 57–72	7–7 (1–5)	McCann Field House (3,738); Poughkeepsie, NY
January 22, 1996	Long Island	L 78–80	7–8 (1–6)	Generoso Pope Athletic Complex (426); Brooklyn, NY
January 25, 1996	at Robert Morris	L 78–82	7–9 (1–7)	Charles L. Sewall Center (812); Moon Township, PA
January 27, 1996	at Saint Francis (PA)	L 60–75	7–10 (1–8)	DeGol Arena (861); Loretto, PA
February 3, 1996	Wagner	L 70–100	7–11 (1–9)	Generoso Pope Athletic Complex (458); Brooklyn, NY
February 5, 1996	Monmouth	L 63–82	7–12 (1–10)	Generoso Pope Athletic Complex (185); Brooklyn, NY
February 8, 1996	at Fairleigh Dickinson	W 70–67	8–12 (2–10)	Rothman Center (757); Hackensack, NJ
February 10, 1996	at Mount St. Mary's	L 56–85	8–13 (2–11)	Knott Arena (3,195); Emmitsburg, MD
February 14, 1996	at Rider	L 50–56	8–14 (2–12)	Alumni Gymnasium (1,414); Lawrenceville, NJ
February 17, 1996	Marist	L 43–52	8–15 (2–13)	Generoso Pope Athletic Complex (214); Brooklyn, NY
February 19, 1996	at Long Island; Battle of Brooklyn	L 77–105	8–16 (2–14)	Schwartz Athletic Center (525); Brooklyn, NY
February 24, 1996	Saint Francis (PA)	L 60–62	8–17 (2–15)	Generoso Pope Athletic Complex (186); Brooklyn, NY
February 26, 1996	Robert Morris	W 63–47	9–17 (3–15)	Generoso Pope Athletic Complex (225); Brooklyn, NY
1996 NEC tournament
February 28, 1996	at Long Island; First Round	L 63–82	9–18	Schwartz Athletic Center (525); Brooklyn, NY
*Non-conference game. ^{#}Rankings from AP Poll. (#) Tournament seedings in parentheses.
