= 1995–96 Monmouth Hawks men's basketball team =

American college basketball season

1995–96 Monmouth Hawks men's basketball

Northeast Conference tournament champions
- Conference: Northeast Conference
- Record: 20–10 (14–4 NEC)
- Head coach: Wayne Szoke (2nd season)
- Assistant coach: Dave Calloway (5th season)
- Home arena: William T. Boylan Gymnasium

1995–96 Northeast Conference men's basketball standings
	Conf.				Overall
Team	W		L	PCT	W		L	PCT
Mount St. Mary's	16	–	2	.889	21	–	8	.724
Marist	14	–	4	.778	22	–	7	.759
Monmouth †	14	–	4	.778	20	–	10	.667
Rider	12	–	6	.667	19	–	11	.633
Saint Francis (PA)	11	–	7	.611	13	–	14	.481
Wagner	7	–	11	.389	10	–	17	.370
Fairleigh Dickinson	6	–	12	.333	7	–	20	.259
Long Island	5	–	13	.278	9	–	19	.321
St. Francis Brooklyn	3	–	15	.167	9	–	18	.333
Robert Morris	2	–	16	.111	5	–	23	.179
† 1996 NEC tournament winner

The 1995–96 Monmouth Hawks men's basketball team represented Monmouth University during the 1995–96 NCAA Division I men's basketball season. The Hawks, led by second-year head coach Wayne Szoke, played their home games at the Multipurpose Activity Center and were members of the Northeast Conference. They finished the season 20–10, 14–4 in NEC play to finish in third place. They won the Northeast Conference Basketball tournament to earn the conference's automatic bid to the NCAA tournament – the first in appearance in school history. Playing as the No. 13 seed in the East region, the Hawks were beaten by No. 4 seed Marquette in the opening round.

== Roster ==
1995–96 Monmouth Hawks men's basketball team
Players	Coaches
Pos. / # / Name / Height / Weight / Year / Hometown; PF / 23 / Corey Albano / 6 ft 9 in (2.06 m) / 190 lb (86 kg) / Jr / Toms River, New Jersey	Head coach: Wayne Szoke; Assistant coach(es): Dave Calloway; Legend: (C) Team captain; (S) Suspended; (I) Ineligible; (W) Walk-on; Injured; Current redshirt; Roster

== Schedule and results ==
Date time, TV	Rank^{#}	Opponent^{#}	Result	Record	Site (attendance) city, state
Regular season
Nov 25, 1995*		Fairfield	L 79–81	0–1	Boylan Gymnasium; West Long Branch, New Jersey
Nov 28, 1995*		at Seton Hall	L 67–83	0–2	Brendan Byrne Arena; East Rutherford, New Jersey
Nov 30, 1995*		at Rutgers	L 55–57	0–3	Louis Brown Athletic Center; Piscataway, New Jersey
Dec 2, 1995*		Army	W 78–57	1–3	Boylan Gymnasium; West Long Branch, New Jersey
Dec 9, 1995*		at Manhattan	L 46–74	1–4	Draddy Gymnasium; New York, New York
Dec 12, 1995*		at Princeton	W 65–56	2–4	Jadwin Gymnasium; Princeton, New Jersey
Dec 21, 1995*		Loyola (MD)	W 73–59	3–4	Boylan Gymnasium; West Long Branch, New Jersey
Dec 28, 1995*		at No. 20 Duke	L 53–69	3–5	Cameron Indoor Stadium (9,314); Durham, North Carolina
Jan 6, 1996		Rider	W 79–54	4–5 (1–0)	Boylan Gymnasium (2,500); West Long Branch, New Jersey
NEC tournament
Mar 1, 1996*		Wagner; Quarterfinals	W 64–55	18–9	Boylan Gymnasium (1,063); West Long Branch, New Jersey
Mar 4, 1996*		at Marist; Semifinals	W 57–56	19–9	McCann Arena (3,499); Poughkeepsie, New York
Mar 8, 1996*		Rider; Championship game	W 60–59	20–9	Boylan Gymnasium (2,500); West Long Branch, New Jersey
NCAA tournament
Mar 14, 1996*	(13 E)	vs. (4 E) No. 20 Marquette; First round	L 44–68	20–10	Providence Civic Center; Providence, Rhode Island
*Non-conference game. ^{#}Rankings from AP Poll. (#) Tournament seedings in parentheses. E=East. All times are in Eastern Time.
