= 2006–07 Marist Red Foxes men's basketball team =

2006–07 season for Marist College basketball

2006–07 Marist Red Foxes men's basketball
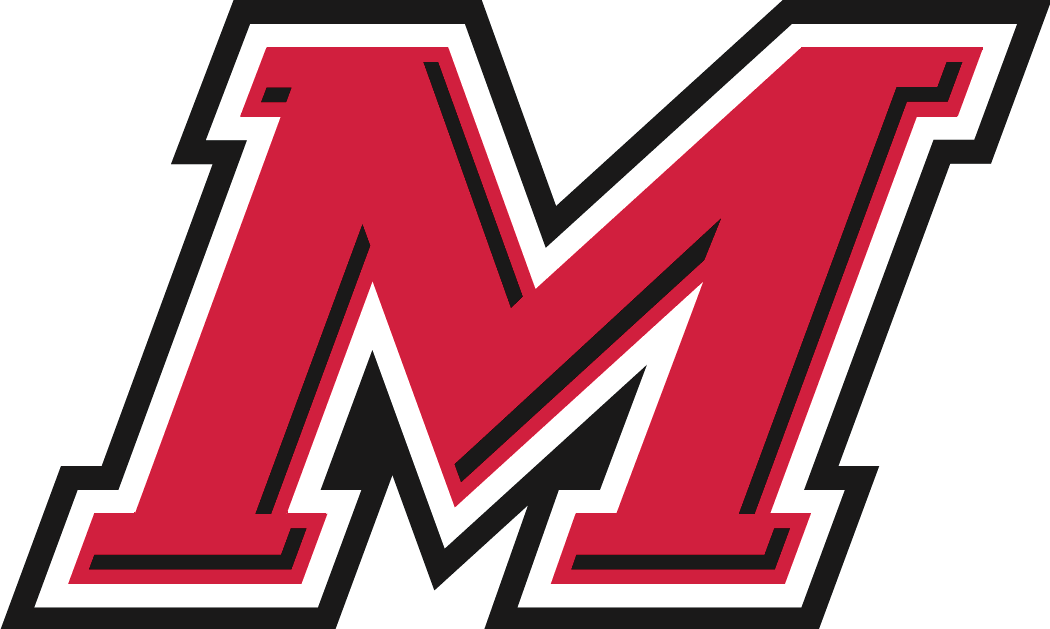

MAAC regular season champions

NIT, Second Round
- Conference: Metro Atlantic Athletic Conference
- Record: 25–9 (14–4 MAAC)
- Head coach: Matt Brady (3rd season)
- Assistant coaches: Rob O'Driscoll; Orlando Ranson; Chris Parsons
- Home arena: McCann Center

2006–07 MAAC men's basketball standings
	Conf.				Overall
Team	W		L	PCT	W		L	PCT
Marist	14	–	4	.778	25	–	9	.735
Niagara †	13	–	5	.722	23	–	12	.657
Loyola (MD)	12	–	6	.667	18	–	13	.581
Siena	12	–	6	.667	20	–	12	.625
Manhattan	10	–	8	.556	13	–	17	.433
Fairfield	10	–	8	.556	13	–	19	.406
Rider	9	–	9	.500	16	–	15	.516
Canisius	6	–	12	.333	12	–	19	.387
Saint Peter's	3	–	15	.167	5	–	25	.167
Iona	1	–	17	.056	2	–	28	.067
† 2007 MAAC tournament winner Rankings from AP Poll

The 2006–07 Marist Red Foxes men's basketball team represented Marist College during the 2006–07 NCAA Division I men's basketball season. The Red Foxes, led by third year head coach Matt Brady, played their home games at the McCann Center and were members of the Metro Atlantic Athletic Conference. The team captains were seniors Jared Jordan and Will Whittington. They finished the season 25–9 overall, 14–4 in MAAC play to finish in first place, winning the MAAC regular season championship. They advanced to the semifinals of the MAAC tournament where they lost to Siena. As a regular season conference champion who failed to win their conference tournament, they received an automatic bid to the 2007 National Invitation Tournament where they defeated Oklahoma State in the first round before falling to NC State in the second round. The season was also highlighted by wins over Big Ten Conference opponent Minnesota and Old Dominion, who had defeated eighth-ranked Georgetown two games prior.

== Preview ==
Marist entered the season having finished in third place in the MAAC the previous season. The team returned first team All-MAAC selection Jordan, and third team All-MAAC selection Whittington. Jordan led the NCAA in total assists with 247, and assists per game with 8.5, while Whittington was a prolific 3-point shooter. James Smith, a versatile 7' center, also returned for Marist. With the returning talent, Marist was the unanimous choice to win the conference title. Jordan was selected as the preseason MAAC player of the year, while Whittington was tabbed as a preseason All-MAAC first team selection.

== Roster ==
2006–07 Marist Red Foxes men's basketball team
Players
Coaches

Pos.	#	Name	Height	Weight	Year	Previous school	Hometown
G	1	Louie McCroskey (redshirt)	6 ft 5 in (1.96 m)	208 lb (94 kg)	Jr	Syracuse	Bronx, NY
G	2	Dave Magarity	6 ft 0 in (1.83 m)	178 lb (81 kg)	Jr	Roy C. Ketcham	Wappingers Falls, NY
F	5	Miles Orman	6 ft 5 in (1.96 m)	214 lb (97 kg)	Sr	Bergen Catholic	Englewood, NJ
G	10	Joe Keegan	6 ft 0 in (1.83 m)	182 lb (83 kg)	Jr	Monsignor Dovovan	Brick, NJ
G	11	Dejuan Goodwin (redshirt)	6 ft 2 in (1.88 m)	171 lb (78 kg)	Fr	Mount St. Joseph	Baltimore, MD
G	13	Will Whittington	6 ft 3 in (1.91 m)	174 lb (79 kg)	Sr	Kingwood	Kingwood, TX
G/F	21	Kaylen Gregory	6 ft 3 in (1.91 m)	180 lb (82 kg)	RS So	Antilles School	St. Thomas, Virgin Islands
G/F	22	Ben Farmer	6 ft 5 in (1.96 m)	193 lb (88 kg)	Jr	St Thomas More Prep (CT)	Clinton, CT
F	23	Lawrence Williams (redshirt)	6 ft 7 in (2.01 m)	220 lb (100 kg)	Fr	Paramus Catholic	Paramus, NJ
G	25	Jared Jordan	6 ft 2 in (1.88 m)	187 lb (85 kg)	Sr	Kingswood-Oxford	Hartford, CT
F	31	Shae McNamara	6 ft 8 in (2.03 m)	209 lb (95 kg)	Jr	Marquette Univ HS	Milwaukee, WI
F	32	Ryan Stilphen	6 ft 8 in (2.03 m)	222 lb (101 kg)	RS Jr	St. Ignatius	Bay Village, OH
F	35	Vince Anthony	6 ft 4 in (1.93 m)	215 lb (98 kg)	So	Burlington City	Burlington City, NJ
F/C	40	James Smith	7 ft 0 in (2.13 m)	250 lb (113 kg)	Sr	Westchester CC	Nyack, NY
F/C	42	Wilfred Benjamin	6 ft 7 in (2.01 m)	230 lb (104 kg)	Jr	Williston State College	St. Francis Village, Trinidad
G	43	Gerald Carter	6 ft 4 in (1.93 m)	185 lb (84 kg)	So	Holderness School	Harlem, NY
F	44	Ryan Schneider (redshirt)	6 ft 7 in (2.01 m)	200 lb (91 kg)	So	Vermont	Yorktown Heights, NY
F/C	50	Marko Vucajnk	6 ft 11 in (2.11 m)	243 lb (110 kg)	RS Fr	Gimnazija Celje-Center	Zalec, Slovenia

Head coach

- Matt Brady (Siena, 3rd yr., 1987)

Assistant coach(es)

- Rob O'Driscoll (Villanova, 3rd yr., 1994)
- Orlando Ranson (Southern New Hampshire, 2nd yr., 1999)
- Chris Parsons (Hofstra, 3rd yr., 1996)

Legend

- (C) Team captain
- (S) Suspended
- (I) Ineligible
- (W) Walk-on
- Injured
- Current redshirt

Roster
Last update: 2019-02-10

== Schedule ==
The team had a fast start to the season, getting off to a 14–4 mark, and 6–1 in conference play. They would lose three of their next four games, but finished the season on an eight-game winning streak. This enabled Marist to qualify for just their fourth post season appearance (2 NCAA and 1 NIT).

Marist's first highlight of the season was a win over Big Ten member Minnesota in the inaugural Old Spice Classic on November 23. Despite playing SEC foe Arkansas close in the semifinals, the Razorbacks proved too tough down the stretch. Marist concluded the Old Spice Classic by defeating Western Michigan in the third place game. Jordan was named to the All-Tournament Team and selected as the MVP of the tournament. The team continued their highlights, defeating Old Dominion at home on November 29, 84–71. Old Dominion had defeated No. 8 ranked Georgetown just 10 days prior to this matchup. The final score was exactly the same as the previous season, although the Monarchs won that contest. Both teams ended the night with identical 5–2 records as well.

On February 24, Marist played their final MAAC game at home against their rival, the Siena Saints. Entering the contest, Marist was 13–4 in MAAC play, while Siena was 12–5. Niagara, who would play against Rider on Sunday afternoon, was also 12–5. There was a potential for a three-way tie for first place should Marist lose the game. The team would need a win to capture the outright MAAC regular season championship for the first time in school history. In a nationally televised game on ESPN2, and in front of a sellout crowd of 3,200, Marist defeated Siena 98–88 in overtime. Both games that the two teams played during the season had been overtime wins for Marist. They ended the regular season slate 23–7 overall, and 14–4 in the MAAC, and clinched the No. 1 seed in the MAAC tournament, while also setting the school mark for victories in a season (23).

As the No. 1 seed in the MAAC tournament in Bridgeport, Connecticut, they defeated No. 8 seed Canisius 87–63 in the quarterfinals. In the semifinals, they were matched up again with Siena, for the third time in the season. This time, Siena defeated Marist 86–78, and Siena moved on to the championship game. Because they finished the season as the No. 1 seed, and failed to win their conference tournament, they were an automatic selection to the NIT. In the first round, they were matched up to play at Oklahoma State in Stillwater, Oklahoma. Senior guard Will Whittington led Marist with 31 points, as Marist scored the upset, 67–64. It was the first postseason win in school history. Despite Whittington leading the Red Foxes with 18 points, Marist lost to NC State in the second round, 62–69 to end the season.

Date time, TV	Rank^{#}	Opponent^{#}	Result	Record	Site (attendance) city, state
Regular season
November 11, 2006*; 2:00 p.m.		at Ohio	L 66–83	0–1	Convocation Center (2,707); Athens, OH
November 14, 2006*; 7:00 p.m.		at Delaware	W 78–62	1–1	Bob Carpenter Center (3,539); Newark, DE
November 19, 2006*; 4:00 p.m.		Florida Atlantic	W 83–67	2–1	McCann Center (2,668); Poughkeepsie, NY
November 23, 2006*; 2:00 p.m., ESPN2		vs. Minnesota; Old Spice Classic -Quarterfinal	W 63–56	3–1	HP Field House (1,057); Orlando, FL
November 24, 2006*; 10:30 a.m., ESPN2		vs. Arkansas; Old Spice Classic -Semifinals	L 64–73	3–2	HP Field House (1,125); Orlando, FL
November 26, 2006*; 4:00 p.m., ESPNU		vs. Western Michigan; Old Spice Classic -Third Place Game	W 89–78	4–2	HP Field House; Orlando, FL
November 29, 2006*; 7:30 p.m.		Old Dominion	W 84–71	5–2	McCann Center (2,613); Poughkeepsie, NY
December 2, 2006*; 7:00 p.m.		at Richmond	W 80–73 ^{OT}	6–2	Robins Center (3,510); Richmond, VA
December 8, 2006; 7:30 p.m.		Canisius	W 80–69	7–2 (1–0)	McCann Center (3,003); Poughkeepsie, NY
December 10, 2006; 2:00 p.m.		at Saint Peter's	W 89–70	8–2 (2–0)	Yanitelli Center (994); Jersey City, NJ
December 19, 2006*; 7:00 p.m.		at Wright State	L 53–63	8–3	Nutter Center (3,032); Fairborn, OH
December 29, 2006*; 7:30 p.m.		Northern Illinois; Pepsi Marist Classic	W 67–63	9–3	McCann Center (2,969); Poughkeepsie, NY
December 30, 2006*; 7:30 p.m.		Central Arkansas; Pepsi Marist Classic	W 71–56	10–3	McCann Center (2,238); Poughkeepsie, NY
January 2, 2007; 7:00 p.m.		at Loyola (Md)	L 69–77	10–4 (2–1)	Reitz Arena (1,852); Baltimore, MD
January 5, 2007; 7:00 p.m., ESPNU		Rider	W 71–55	11–4 (3–1)	McCann Center (2,458); Poughkeepsie, NY
January 9, 2007; 7:30 p.m.		Iona	W 87–65	12–4 (4–1)	McCann Center (2,141); Poughkeepsie, NY
January 15, 2007; 5:00 p.m., MSG		at Siena	W 84–75 ^{OT}	13–4 (5–1)	Times Union Center (6,714); Albany, NY
January 18, 2007; 7:00 p.m.		at Niagara	W 91–86 ^{OT}	14–4 (6–1)	Gallagher Center (1,727); Lewiston, NY
January 20, 2007; 2:00 p.m.		at Canisius	L 74–84	14–5 (6–2)	Koessler Athletic Center (1,317); Buffalo, NY
January 23, 2007; 7:30 p.m.		Saint Peter's	W 67–58	15–5 (7–2)	McCann Center (2,493); Poughkeepsie, NY
January 26, 2007; 7:30 p.m.		Niagara	L 75–83	15–6 (7–3)	McCann Center (3,200); Poughkeepsie, NY
January 30, 2007; 7:00 p.m.		at Manhattan	L 74–75	15–7 (7–4)	Draddy Gymnasium (2,224); Riverdale, NY
February 3, 2007; 7:30 p.m.		Loyola (Md)	W 71–66	16–7 (8–4)	McCann Center (3,200); Poughkeepsie, NY
February 5, 2007; 7:30 p.m.		at Rider	W 79–78	17–7 (9–4)	Alumni Gymnasium (1,510); Lawrenceville, NJ
February 8, 2007; 7:30 p.m.		Fairfield	W 65–64	18–7 (10–4)	McCann Center (3,016); Poughkeepsie, NY
February 11, 2007; 3:30 p.m.		at Iona	W 79–53	19–7 (11–4)	Hynes Athletic Center (2,334); New Rochelle, NY
February 15, 2007; 7:30 p.m.		Manhattan	W 73–57	20–7 (12–4)	McCann Center (2,486); Poughkeepsie, NY
February 17, 2007*; 7:30 p.m.		Colgate; ESPN BracketBusters	W 63–47	21–7	McCann Center (2,981); Poughkeepsie, NY
February 19, 2007; 7:00 p.m.		at Fairfield	W 67–60	22–7 (13–4)	Arena at Harbor Yard (3,474); Bridgeport, CT
February 24, 2007; 11:00 a.m., ESPN2		Siena	W 98–88 ^{OT}	23–7 (14–4)	McCann Center (3,200); Poughkeepsie, NY
MAAC tournament
March 3, 2007; 4:00 p.m., MSG	(1)	vs. (8) Canisius; Quarterfinals	W 87–63	24–7	Arena at Harbor Yard (3,762); Bridgeport, CT
March 4, 2007; 6:00 p.m., MSG	(1)	vs. (4) Siena; Semifinals	L 78–86	24–8	Arena at Harbor Yard; Bridgeport, CT
2007 NIT
March 13, 2007; 10:00 p.m., ESPNU	(7)	at (2) Oklahoma State; First Round	W 67–64	25–8	Gallagher-Iba Arena (7,507); Stillwater, OK
March 16, 2007; 9:30 p.m., ESPNU	(7)	at (6) NC State; Second Round	L 62–69	25–9	Reynolds Coliseum (8,400); Raleigh, NC
*Non-conference game. ^{#}Rankings from AP Poll. (#) Tournament seedings in parentheses. All times are in Eastern Time.

== Player statistics ==
Individual player statistics (Final)
			Minutes		Scoring		Total FGs			3-point FGs			Free-Throws			Rebounds								
Player	GP	GS	Tot	Avg	Pts	Avg	FG	FGA	Pct	3FG	3FA	Pct	FT	FTA	Pct	Off	Def	Tot	Avg	A	PF	TO	Stl	Blk
Vince Anthony	8	0	17	2.1	6	0.8	3	7	42.9%	0	1	0.0%	0	0	–––	1	1	2	0.3	0	2	0	1	0
Wilfred Benjamin	34	0	589	17.3	202	5.9	74	132	56.1%	0	0	–––	54	80	67.5%	68	107	175	5.1	15	83	43	16	4
Gerald Carter	33	1	388	11.8	72	2.2	25	74	33.8%	4	24	16.7%	18	36	50.0%	21	38	59	1.8	27	51	23	18	5
Ben Farmer	34	33	1079	31.7	194	5.7	65	164	39.6%	43	114	37.7%	21	28	75.0%	30	90	120	3.5	59	71	47	25	9
Kaylen Gregory	25	0	140	5.6	53	2.1	18	53	34.0%	5	24	20.8%	12	20	60.0%	2	14	16	0.6	3	13	12	6	0
Jared Jordan	33	33	1252	37.9	566	17.2	197	464	42.5%	56	188	29.8%	116	168	69.0%	46	148	194	5.9	286	54	110	45	2
Joe Keegan	9	0	24	2.7	2	0.2	0	0	–––	0	0	–––	2	6	33.3%	0	1	1	0.1	2	1	2	1	0
Dave Magarity, Jr.	9	1	23	2.6	3	0.3	0	0	–––	0	0	–––	3	4	75.0%	0	2	2	0.2	2	3	0	1	0
Shae McNamara	31	3	385	12.4	97	3.1	36	67	53.7%	5	20	25.0%	20	27	74.1%	20	50	70	2.3	19	56	19	13	8
Miles Orman	18	1	150	8.3	24	1.3	9	22	40.9%	0	2	00.0%	6	16	37.5%	8	10	18	1.0	3	28	12	4	2
James Smith	34	34	791	23.3	385	11.3	147	299	49.2%	58	146	39.7%	33	53	62.3%	58	146	204	6.0	8	101	65	11	35
Ryan Stilphen	32	30	792	24.8	347	10.8	135	233	57.9%	4	15	26.7%	73	108	67.6%	53	98	151	4.7	32	87	41	14	4
Will Whittington	34	34	1272	37.4	597	17.6	179	456	39.3%	137	345	39.7%	102	128	79.7%	29	84	113	3.3	58	78	58	34	5
Total	34	–	–	–	2548	74.9	888	1971	45.1%	312	879	35.5%	460	674	68.2%	405	850	1255	36.9	514	628	441	189	74
Opponents	34	–	–	–	2337	68.7	831	1904	43.6%	215	684	31.4%	460	666	69.1%	336	803	1139	33.5	409	681	454	200	94

Legend
GP	Games played	GS	Games started	Avg	Average per game
FG	Field-goals made	FGA	Field-goal attempts	Off	Offensive rebounds
Def	Defensive rebounds	A	Assists	TO	Turnovers
Blk	Blocks	Stl	Steals	High	Team leader

== Awards & milestones ==
=== MAAC Conference honors ===
The following players/coaches earned Metro Atlantic Athletic Conference postseason recognition:

MAAC Player of the Year

- Jared Jordan, Marist (Sr., G, Hartford, Connecticut)

First team All-MAAC

- Jared Jordan, Marist

Second team All-MAAC

- Will Whittington, Marist (Sr., G, Kingwood, Texas)

MAAC Coach of the Year

- Matt Brady

=== Other awards and honors ===
- Jared Jordan – All-New York Metropolitan NCAA Division I men's college basketball player of the year. (Haggerty Award)
- On June 28, 2007, Jordan was selected 45th in the 2007 NBA draft by the Los Angeles Clippers.

=== Season records ===
- Marist set an all-time single season school record with 25 wins. Ironically, the women's team also set a school record for wins during the same season, winning 29 games.
- Jordan led the nation in total assists and assists per game for the second consecutive year, 286 total and 8.7 per game.
- Will Whittington led the nation in 3-point field goals made and attempted, going 137–345.

== Rankings ==
Ranking movement Legend: ██ Improvement in ranking. ██ Decrease in ranking. ██ Not ranked the previous week. RV=Others receiving votes.
Poll	Pre Nov 6	Wk 2 Nov 13	Wk 3 Nov 20	Wk 4 Nov 27	Wk 5 Dec 4	Wk 6 Dec 11	Wk 7 Dec 18	Wk 8 Dec 25	Wk 9 Jan 1	Wk 10 Jan 8	Wk 11 Jan 15	Wk 12 Jan 22	Wk 13 Jan 29	Wk 14 Feb 5	Wk 15 Feb 12	Wk 16 Feb 19	Wk 17 Feb 26	Wk 18 Mar 5	Post Wk 1 Mar 12	Final
AP	NR	NR	NR	NR	NR	NR	NR	NR	NR	NR	NR	NR	NR	NR	NR	NR	NR	NR	NR	(Note: No Associated Press Poll this week.)
Coaches	NR	NR	NR	NR	NR	NR	NR	NR	NR	NR	NR	NR	NR	NR	NR	NR	RV	NR	NR	NR

== See also ==
2006–07 Marist Red Foxes women's basketball team
