= Izett Buchanan =

American basketball player (born 1972)

Personal information
- Born: May 8, 1972 (age 54)
- Listed height: 6 ft 6 in (1.98 m)
- Listed weight: 200 lb (91 kg)

Career information
- High school: Goshen Central (Goshen, New York)
- College: Marist (1990–1994)
- NBA draft: 1994: undrafted
- Playing career: 1994–2007
- Position: Guard / small forward

Career history
- 1994–95: EBBC Den Bosch
- 1995: ESPE Basket Châlons-en-Champagne
- 1996: BK Ventspils
- 1996–97: Hapoel Givataim
- 1997: Polluelos de Aibonito
- 1997–98: Hapoel Givataim
- 1998: Hapoel Tel Aviv
- 1999: Andino Sport Club
- 1999: Gaiteros de Zulia
- 1999–2000: Maccabi Karmiel
- 2000–01: Maccabi Ashdod
- 2001: Cocodrilos de Caracas
- 2002: Universo/Ajax
- 2002: Shanshi YuJing
- 2002–03: Club Central Jounieh
- 2003: Trotamundos de Carabobo
- 2003: Henan Hong Li
- 2004: Paris Basket Racing
- 2004: Clermont-Ferrand
- 2005: Gatos de Monagas
- 2005: Jundiaí
- 2006: Assis Basket
- 2007: Club La Unión

Career highlights
- LNB Pro B champion; Haggerty Award co-winner (1994); NEC Player of the Year (1994); 2× First team All-NEC (1992, 1994)

William Izett Buchanan (born May 8, 1972) is an American former professional basketball player.

== Early life ==
Buchanan hails from Goshen, New York and attended Goshen Central High School. He graduated in 1990 having scored 1,344 points during his high school career.

== College ==
Buchanan played basketball at Marist College from 1990 to 1994. During his four-year career, he scored 1,593 points, including a school single game-record 51 against Long Island during the 1993–94 season. That same year, he set a season record with 645 points en route to being named the Northeast Conference Men's Basketball Player of the Year He also shared the Haggerty Award with Artūras Karnišovas of Seton Hall. Sports Illustrated named him their national player of the week for that effort. He finished his Marist career in the top 10 of other major statistical categories, including career steals (137), rebounds (613), scoring average (16.6), and free throws made (390).

=== Off-court incident ===
In April of 1994, his senior year, Buchanan and one other individual were charged in Poughkeepsie, New York with grand larceny, criminal possession of stolen property, and conspiracy. Together, they were alleged to have broken into a locker at a sports club that Buchanan was a member of, stolen a watch, $14, and two credit cards, and having subsequently made over $1,000 in purchases with those credit cards. This did not affect his NCAA eligibility or cause any repercussions for him with the Marist basketball program.

== Professional career ==
Buchanan has been a journeyman in his professional career, playing for myriad teams in different countries.

In 1994, Buchanan joined EBBC Den Bosch in the Netherlands. He was dismissed in 1995 due to character issues. He then played a brief stint at ESPE Basket Châlons-en-Champagne in early 1995. In 1996, Buchanan was a member of BK Ventspils.

In the 1996-97 season, Buchanan played for Hapoel Givataim in Israel's second-tier league, Ligua Leumit. In 1997, he played for the Polluelos de Aibonito in Puerto Rico, averaging 19.3 points per game across 25 games played. He returned to Israel to play 2 games for Hapoel Tel Aviv in 1998.

In 1999, he played 2 games for Andino Sport Club in Argentina, before leaving due to a payment dispute. Later that year, he played 5 matches for Gaiteros de Zulia in Venezuela before being cut. For the 1999–2000 season, Buchanan returned to Israel for a third time to play for Maccabi Karmiel, but was sidelined due to an injury. After a rehab stint at a pro camp in Columbus, Ohio, he joined the Israeli team Maccabi Ashdod for the 2000–01 season, where he averaged 26.9 points, 6.3 rebounds, and 3.5 assists per game. In 2001 and 2002, he also had stints with Cocodrilos de Caracas in Venezuela, Universo/Ajax in Brazil, and Shanshi YuJing in China.

In 2002, Buchanan tried out for Antranik Beirut in Lebanon, but did not make the team; instead, he joined Club Central Jounieh, also in Lebanon, for the 2002–03 season. Later in 2003, he played stints for Trotamundos de Carabobo in Venezuela and Henan Hong Li in China.

In 2004, Buchanan spent a month playing for Paris Basket Racing in France's Pro A league, where he averaged 5.3 points per game. He then signed for the remainder of the season with Clermont-Ferrand in France's Pro B league, where he averaged 12.4 points per game.

In 2005, Buchanan played for the Venezuelan team Gatos de Monagas and a Brazilian team in Jundiaí. In February 2006, he signed to Assis Basket. In January 2007, he signed to the Argentinian team Club La Unión.
