= Mike Maker (basketball) =

American basketball coach (born 1965)

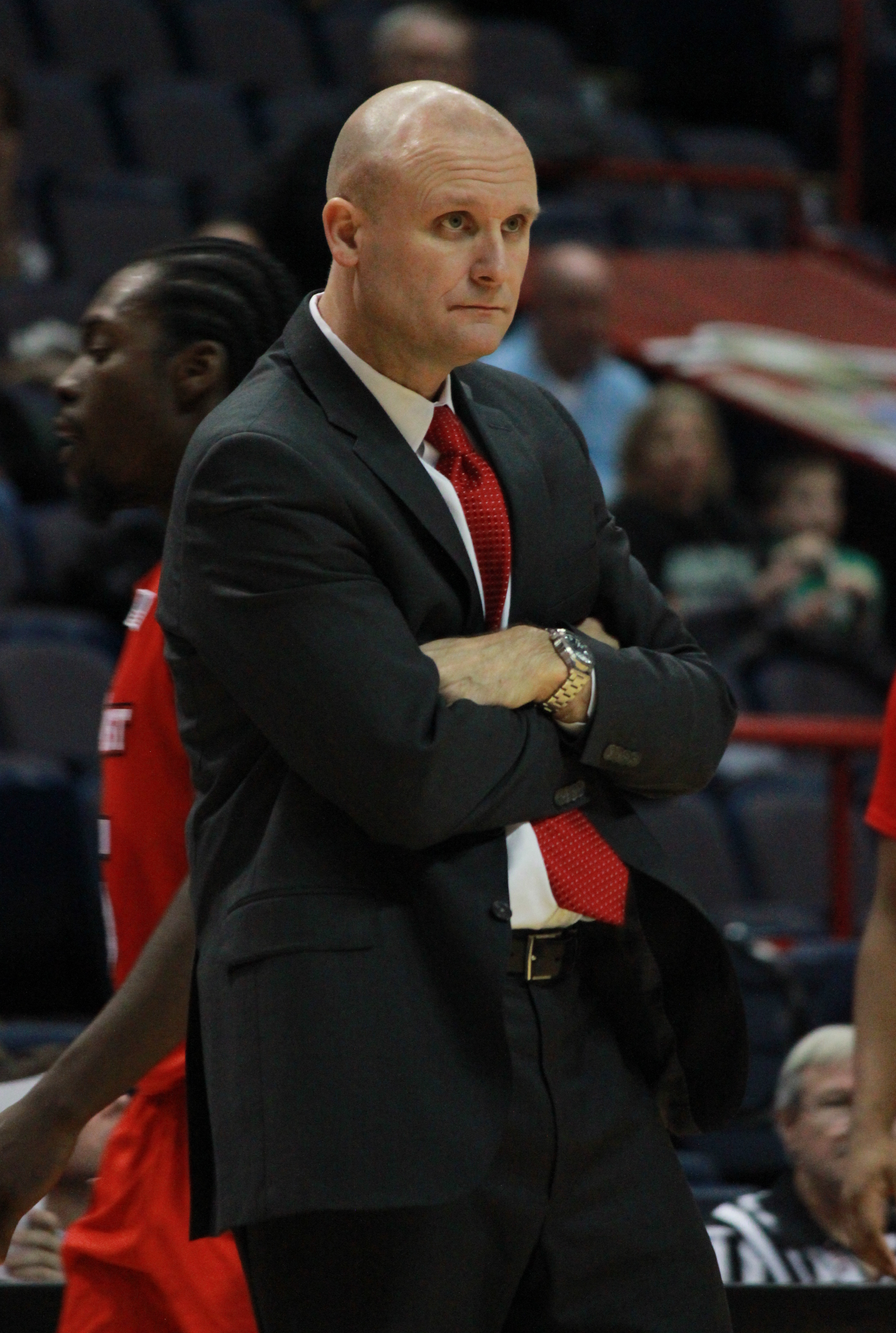

Current position
- Title: Assistant Coach
- Team: St. Thomas
- Conference: Summit League

Biographical details
- Born: November 9, 1965 (age 60); Salinas, California, U.S.

Playing career
- 1984–1986: Hartnell
- 1986–1988: California Baptist

Coaching career (HC unless noted)
- 1988–1990: California Baptist (assistant)
- 1990–1991: Hartnell (women's HC)
- 1991–2002: Dartmouth (assistant)
- 2002–2005: Samford (assistant)
- 2005–2007: West Virginia (assistant)
- 2007–2008: Creighton (assistant)
- 2008–2014: Williams
- 2014–2018: Marist
- 2021–present: St. Thomas (assistant)

Head coaching record
- Overall: 175–129 (.576)

Accomplishments and honors

Championships
- 2× NESCAC regular season (2010, 2011); NESCAC Tournament (2010)

Michael Jon Maker (born November 9, 1965) is an American college basketball coach who is currently an assistant coach at the University of St. Thomas. He was previously the head coach at Marist College.

== Early years ==
Maker grew up in Salinas, California and played high school basketball at North Salinas High School before playing college basketball at Hartnell College and California Baptist University.

== Coaching career ==
=== Assistant coach ===
After graduating from Cal Baptist, he joined the staff of his alma mater as an assistant and junior varsity head coach, a position he held for two seasons. In 1990, he spent one season as the head women's basketball coach at Hartnell College before moving on to Dartmouth College, where he served as an assistant from 1991 to 2002. Maker also had stops at Samford, West Virginia, and Creighton as an assistant before landing the men's head coaching job at Division III Williams College.

=== Williams (2008–2014) ===
In his six seasons at Williams, Maker guided the Ephs to a 147–32 record (.821 winning percentage), and three Final Four appearances, including the title game in 2010 and 2014.

=== Marist (2014–2018) ===
On June 17, 2014, Maker was named the 11th head coach in Marist Red Foxes men's basketball history, replacing Jeff Bower, who left to become the general manager of the NBA's Detroit Pistons. After a 28-97 record over four seasons, Maker was fired from Marist in 2018.

=== Return to assistant coaching (2018–present) ===
Maker was named an assistant coach at the University of St. Thomas on April 1, 2021.

== Head coaching record ==
=== NCAA DIII ===
Record table
Season	Team	Overall	Conference	Standing	Postseason
Williams Ephs (New England Small College Athletic Conference) (2008–2014)
2008–09	Williams	17–9	6–3	3rd	
2009–10	Williams	30–2	9–0	1st	NCAA Division III Runner-up
2010–11	Williams	29–3	9–0	1st	NCAA Division III Final Four
2011–12	Williams	17–8	5–5	T–5th	
2012–13	Williams	26–5	9–1	2nd	NCAA Division III Elite Eight
2013–14	Williams	28–5	9–1	T–1st	NCAA Division III Runner-up
Williams:		147–32 (.821)	47–10 (.825)		
Total:		147–32 (.821)			
National champion Postseason invitational champion Conference regular season champion Conference regular season and conference tournament champion Division regular season champion Division regular season and conference tournament champion Conference tournament champion

=== NCAA DI ===
Record table
Season	Team	Overall	Conference	Standing	Postseason
Marist Red Foxes (Metro Atlantic Athletic Conference) (2014–2018)
2014–15	Marist	7–25	5–15	T–10th	
2015–16	Marist	7–23	4–16	11th	
2016–17	Marist	8–24	5–15	T–10th	
2017–18	Marist	6–25	4–14	T–10th	
Marist:		28–97 (.224)	18–60 (.231)		
Total:		28–97 (.224)			
National champion Postseason invitational champion Conference regular season champion Conference regular season and conference tournament champion Division regular season champion Division regular season and conference tournament champion Conference tournament champion
