= Chavaughn Lewis =

American basketball player (born 1993)

Free Agent
- Position: Shooting guard / small forward

Personal information
- Born: February 1, 1993 (age 33) Queens, New York, U.S.
- Listed height: 6 ft 5 in (1.96 m)
- Listed weight: 195 lb (88 kg)

Career information
- High school: St. Mary's (Manhasset, New York)
- College: Marist (2011–2015)
- NBA draft: 2015: undrafted
- Playing career: 2015–present

Career history
- 2015–2016: Juventus Utena
- 2016–2017: Czarni Słupsk
- 2017–2018: Start Lublin
- 2018–2019: BC Kalev
- 2019: Nizhny Novgorod
- 2019–2020: Enisey
- 2020–2021: BC Kalev
- 2021–2022: Hapoel Galil Elyon
- 2022–2025: Ironi Kiryat Ata
- 2025: Brillantes del Zulia
- 2025: Astros de Jalisco
- 2025–2026: Zastal Zielona Góra

Career highlights
- BIBL champion (2022); Estonian Cup winner (2020); All-KML Team (2019); VTB United League steals leader (2019); 2× Second-team All-MAAC (2014, 2015); Third-team All-MAAC (2013); MAAC All-Rookie Team (2012)

Chavaughn Daniel Lewis (born February 1, 1993) is an American professional basketball player who last played for Zastal Zielona Góra in the Polish Basketball League (PLK). He played high school basketball at St. Mary's High School in Manhasset, New York, reaching the Class A state finals as a senior in 2011. He then played college basketball with the Marist Red Foxes; in four seasons with the team he obtained three All-MAAC selections and was included in the NABC All-District Second Team in his senior season. His 2,119 career points at Marist make him the top scorer in program history. After going undrafted in the 2015 NBA draft, Lewis played in the NBA Summer League for the Philadelphia 76ers before starting his professional career in Lithuania with Juventus Utena.

== High school career ==
Lewis was born in the New York City borough of Queens to Edgar and Pansy Lewis, and attended St. Mary's High School in Manhasset, New York. Lewis' father Edgar died on March 28, 2009. Chavaughn Lewis established himself as one of the best players in the Long Island area, and in his senior year he averaged 24 points, 8 rebounds, 4 assists, 3 steals, and 2 blocks per game. His team amassed a 28–0 record on the way to the Class A state finals in the 2011 season, where they lost to Long Island Lutheran, 51–78. St. Mary's ended the season with a 29–1 record, and Lewis was selected to the NYSSWA All-State First Team.

Lewis received offers from several NCAA Division I programs, including Long Island, Marist, Loyola (Maryland) and Siena: he opted to play at Marist.

== College career ==
During his freshman season, Lewis earned MAAC All-Rookie Team honors, averaging 14.4 points, 4.7 rebounds, 1.8 assists and 1.7 steals per game, shooting 32.9% on three-pointers. He had 460 points for the season, a record for a Marist freshman. Lewis posted a season-high 25 points against Iona on March 3, 2012.

In his sophomore year, Lewis started all 31 games of the season, and posted averages of 16.7 points, 5.7 rebounds, 2.7 assists and 2 steals per game: he was twice named MAAC Player of the Week (February 25 and December 17), led the team in scoring and minutes, led the conference in steals per game, and scored a career-high 30 points against VMI on February 23, 2013; in the same game he also posted his career high in rebounds with 16. At the end of the season he was named in the All-MAAC Third Team.

Before the start of his junior season, Lewis was named in the preseason All-MAAC Second Team. He was named team captain and played 31 games (29 starts) and averaged 17.5 points, 5 rebounds, 2.8 assists and 1.9 steals per game: on November 10 he scored his 1,000th career point in a game against Elon; on February 16 he scored a season-high 28 points against Monmouth, and on March 6 he reached the 1,500 points milestone in the game against Niagara. He led the team in minutes, scoring, assists and steals, and led the conference in steals; he was included in the All-MAAC Second Team.

Lewis was again a preseason All-MAAC Second Team selection before the start of his senior year at Marist, which was his second as team captain. During the season, Lewis had 18 games with 20 or more points, and two 30-point games: he scored a career high 35 on February 2, 2015, in a game against Canisius. He ended the season with 29 appearances (all starts) and led his team in scoring (20.6 points per game), assists (2.7) and steals (2.3); he reached 2,119 career points, the best mark in Marist history, passing Steve Smith's 2,077. He was named in the All-MAAC Second Team and in the NABC All-District Second Team.

== Professional career ==
=== 2015–20 ===
After the end of his collegiate career, Lewis was invited to participate in the 2015 Portsmouth Invitational Tournament as part of the Mike Duman Auto Sales team. After pre-draft workouts with the Toronto Raptors and the Philadelphia 76ers, Lewis was undrafted in the 2015 NBA draft; he was included in the 76ers roster for the 2015 NBA Summer League in Salt Lake City, Utah, during which he played 3 games averaging 1 point and 1 rebound in 6.2 minutes of average playing time. He then started his professional career in Lithuania with Juventus Utena, playing in the Lietuvos krepšinio lyga (LKL), the top tier of Lithuanian basketball: he played 36 regular season games, averaging 10.8 points, 3.3 rebounds and 2.5 assists, and 11 playoff games, with averages of 13.7 points, 4.5 rebounds and 5.4 assists per game. He also appeared in 14 FIBA Europe Cup games, posting averages of 11.1 points, 3.5 rebounds, 2.1 assists and 2.2 steals per game.

In the summer of 2016 he was part of the Detroit Pistons roster for the 2016 NBA Summer League in Orlando, Florida: Lewis played 4 games and averaged 4.3 points, 1 rebounds and 0.5 assists in 12.7 minutes per game. He then signed for Czarni Słupsk, a team of the Polska Liga Koszykówki (PLK), the top Polish basketball league: he played 28 games, averaging 14.1 points, 4.6 rebounds, 4.7 assists and 1.9 steals per game. He also had 10 appearances in the league playoffs, increasing his averages to 15.9 points. 4.6 rebounds and 5.6 assists per game. In the 2017 offseason he signed a contract with Start Lublin, another PLK team, and over 33 games he averaged career-highs in points (20.1) and rebounds (5.5) in 33 minutes of average playing time.

His performance in Poland attracted the attention of Kalev/Cramo, a team that played in the VTB United League and the Latvian–Estonian Basketball League (LEBL). Lewis joined the team for the 2018–19 season and played 20 games in the 2018–19 LEBL with 11.7 points, 3.2 rebounds and 3.2 assists per game; in the 2018–19 VTB United League he averaged 16.2 points, 3.6 rebounds, 5.1 assists and a league-leading 2.1 steals per game. He also played 5 LEBL playoff games, and 3 VTB playoff games with Kalev/Cramo.

On July 8, 2019, Lewis signed with Nizhny Novgorod and played in the first part of the season, participating in 5 games during the 2019–20 Basketball Champions League (2 in the qualifying round, 3 in the regular season) and in 6 games of the 2019–20 VTB United League; he then left the team in late November and signed with BC Enisey, another VTB United League team. He appeared in 7 league games with Enisey and took part in the 2019–20 FIBA Europe Cup, playing 2 games. On October 1, 2020, Lewis signed a contract with Kalev/Cramo, returning to the club.

=== 2021–present ===
On August 9, 2021, he signed with Hapoel Galil Elyon of the Israeli Basketball Premier League. In 2021–22 he averaged 11.6 points, 3.3 assists, and 1.2 steals per game.

In the summer of 2022, Lewis signed with Ironi Kiryat Ata of the Israeli Basketball Premier League.

On November 30, 2025, he signed with Zastal Zielona Góra of the Polish Basketball League (PLK).
