= St. Mary's High School (Manhasset, New York) =

Saint Mary's High School

Location
- 51 Clapham Avenue; Manhasset, New York 11030; United States; 40°47′28″N 73°41′57″W

Information
- Type: Private, Coeducational
- Motto: Omina ad Jesum per Mariam (Everything to Jesus through Mary)
- Religious affiliation: Roman Catholic
- Patron saint: Saint Mary
- Established: 1949
- Founder: Sisters, Servants of the Immaculate Heart of Mary and the Marist Brothers of the Schools
- School code: 699
- CEEB code: 333015
- Principal: Gerard Buckley
- Grades: 9-12
- Campus size: Medium
- Colors: Blue and White
- Athletics: Multiple
- Athletics conference: Nassau/Suffolk Catholic High School Athletic Association (NSCHSAA)
- Sports: Soccer, Basketball, Lacrosse, Swimming, Hockey, Bowling, Badminton, Tennis, Volleyball, Baseball, Softball, etc.
- Nickname: Gaels
- Accreditation: Middle States Association of Colleges and Schools
- Newspaper: The Magnificat
- Yearbook: Gael
- School fees: $350 Registration Deposit
- Tuition: $1,200 (2024-2025)
- Communities served: Archdiocese of New York, Diocese of Brooklyn and Diocese of Rockville Centre
- Alumni: Alumni Website
- Website: School Website

Saint Mary's High School is a private Catholic high school in Manhasset, New York, United States.

== Description ==
Although St. Mary's parish is part of the Roman Catholic Diocese of Rockville Centre, the school serves families of the Roman Catholic Archdiocese of New York, the Diocese of Brooklyn and the Diocese of Rockville Centre. It is located off Northern Boulevard at 51 Clapham Avenue, Manhasset, near the Miracle Mile. St. Mary's Men's Varsity Ice Hockey is the all-time leader in New York State Championships, winning consecutive titles between 1994 & 2006. The Girls Varsity Basketball team won consecutive New York State Championship titles in 2021-2022 and 2022-2023.

Starting in 2011 students are issued an iPad configured for educational use. Starting in 2018, students are issued a Chromebook replacing their iPad. Personal devices are not allowed including phones, media players, and computers. In September 2021, the school staff includes several members of the Dominican Sisters of Mary, Mother of the Eucharist.

== Notable alumni ==
- Joseph F. Bianco, Judge of the United States Court of Appeals for the Second Circuit
- Pat Buck, professional wrestler, trainer and promoter for All Elite Wrestling
- Kevin Cosgrove, business executive and victim of the September 11 attacks
- Robert Cuccioli, actor and singer
- Matt Gilroy (born 1984), member of the NHL, New York Rangers, Ottawa Senators, Tampa Bay Lightning, and member of Team USA at the 2018 Winter Olympics
- Danny Green (born 1987), NBA player
- Dennis Herrera, San Francisco City Attorney
- Chavaughn Lewis (born 1993), basketball player for Hapoel Galil Elyon of the Israeli Basketball Premier League
- Scott Machado (born 1990), basketball player in the Israeli Basketball Premier League
- Doug McIntyre (born 1957), writer, radio host
- Dave Pietramala, Defensive Coordinator for the University of North Carolina at Chapel Hill
- Donald Lee Pilling, US Vice Chief of Naval Operations from 1997 to 2000
- Nick Richards (born 1997), NBA player for the Phoenix Suns
- Chuck Schilling (1937–2021), Major League Baseball player for Boston Red Sox
