= Jake Gaither Gymnasium =

Multi-purpose arena in Tallahassee, Florida

- "Gaither Gym"
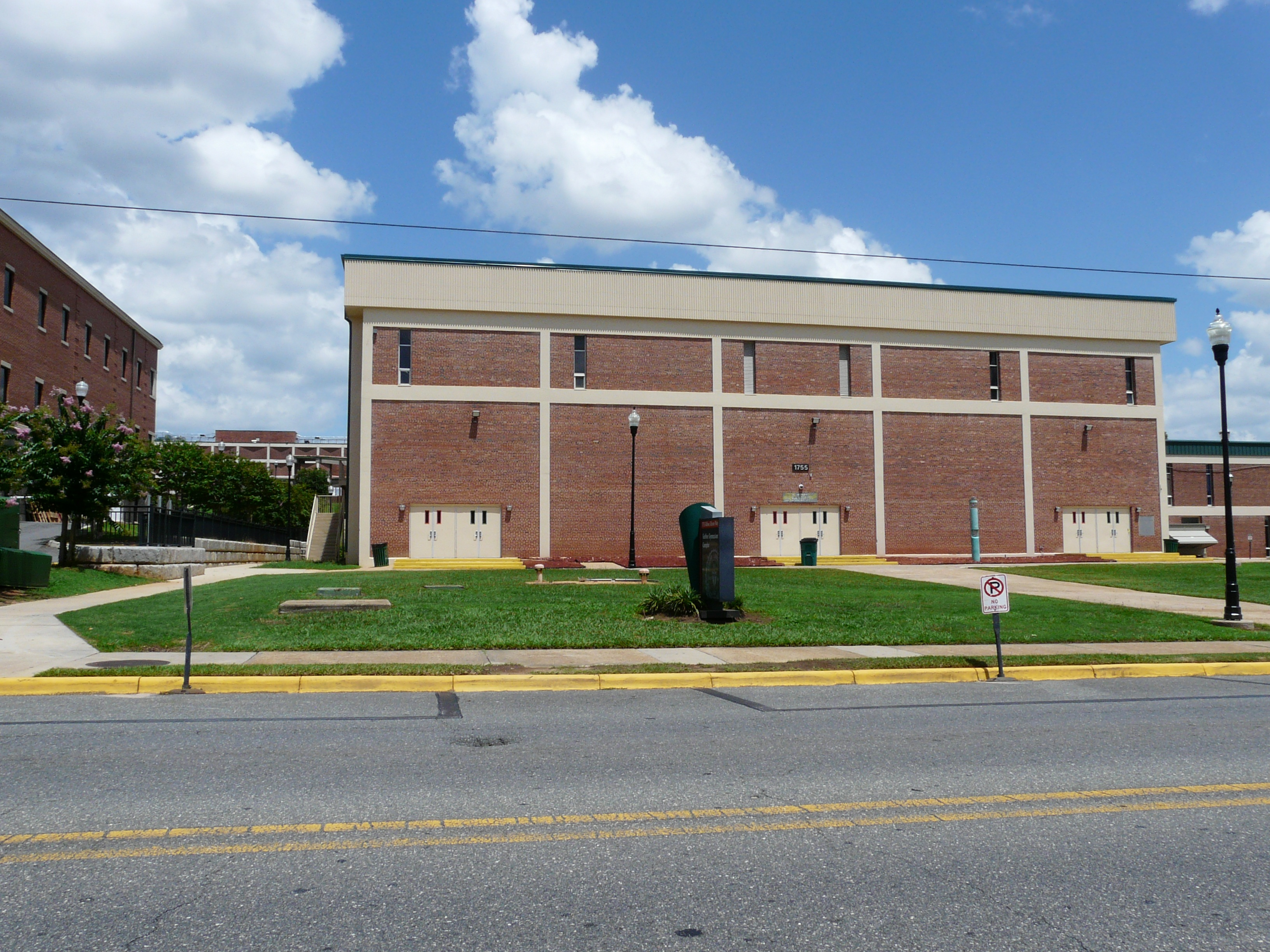
- Interactive map of Jake Gaither Gymnasium
- Location: Tallahassee, Florida
- Coordinates: 30.424318°N 84.290473°W
- Owner: Florida A&M University
- Operator: Florida A&M University
- Capacity: 3,500

Construction
- Built: 1963

Jake Gaither Gymnasium is a 3,365-seat multi-purpose arena in Tallahassee, Florida. It was built in 1963 and was home to the Florida A&M University Rattlers basketball team until 2008. It is named for Jake Gaither, head football coach at Florida A&M University from 1945 until 1969. In November 2009, the Rattlers Men's and Women's Basketball teams as well as the Women's Volleyball team moved into the Senator Al Lawson Multi Purpose Teaching Gymnasium, across the street from Gaither Gym.
