= 1995–96 Marist Red Foxes men's basketball team =

American college basketball season

1995–96 Marist Red Foxes men's basketball
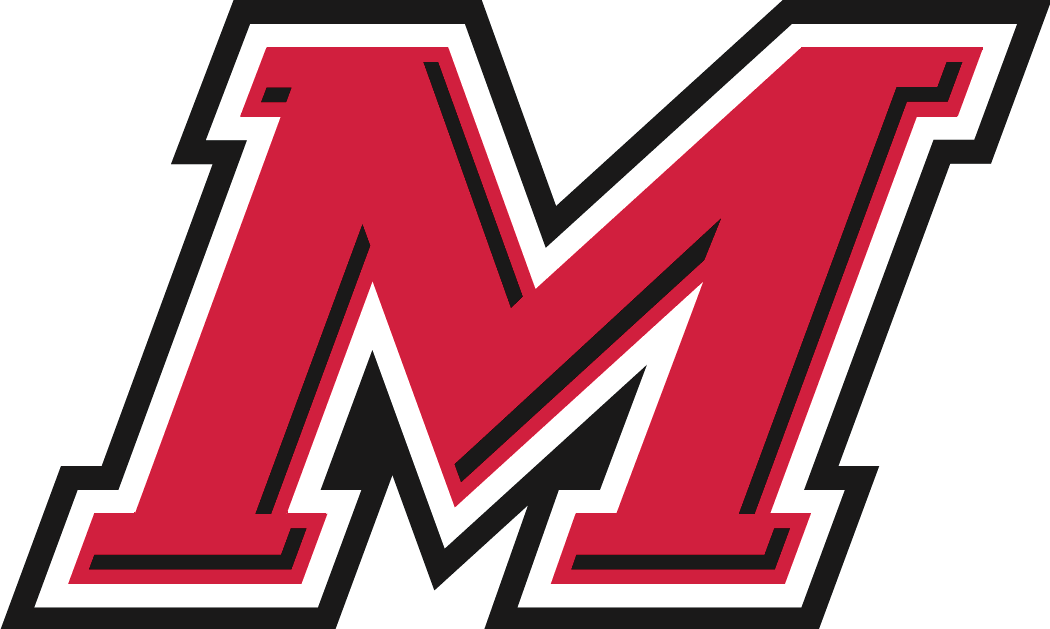

NIT, First Round
- Conference: Northeast Conference
- Record: 22–7 (14–4 NEC)
- Head coach: Dave Magarity (10th season)
- Home arena: McCann Recreation Center

1995–96 Northeast Conference men's basketball standings
	Conf.				Overall
Team	W		L	PCT	W		L	PCT
Mount St. Mary's	16	–	2	.889	21	–	8	.724
Marist	14	–	4	.778	22	–	7	.759
Monmouth †	14	–	4	.778	20	–	10	.667
Rider	12	–	6	.667	19	–	11	.633
Saint Francis (PA)	11	–	7	.611	13	–	14	.481
Wagner	7	–	11	.389	10	–	17	.370
Fairleigh Dickinson	6	–	12	.333	7	–	20	.259
Long Island	5	–	13	.278	9	–	19	.321
St. Francis Brooklyn	3	–	15	.167	9	–	18	.333
Robert Morris	2	–	16	.111	5	–	23	.179
† 1996 NEC tournament winner

The 1995–96 Marist Red Foxes men's basketball team represented Marist College in the 1995–96 NCAA Division I men's basketball season. The Red Foxes, led by tenth-year head coach Dave Magarity, played their home games at the James J. McCann Recreation Center in Poughkeepsie, New York as members of the Northeast Conference. They finished the season 22–7, 14–4 in NEC play, finishing in second place. As the No. 2 seed in the NEC tournament, they advanced to the semifinals, where they were defeated at home by third-seeded Monmouth 56–57. The Red Foxes earned an invite to the 1996 NIT, traveling to Rhode Island and were defeated in the first round 77–82.

== Previous season ==
The Red Foxes finished the 1994–95 season 17–11, 12–6 in NEC play to finish in a tie for second place. As the No. 3 seed in the NEC tournament, they advanced to the semifinals, where they were defeated on the road by No. 2 seeded Mount St. Mary's 79–84.

== Roster ==
1995–96 Marist Red Foxes men's basketball team
Players
Coaches

Pos.	#	Name	Height	Weight	Year	Hometown
G	5	Danny Basile	6 ft 0 in (1.83 m)	180 lb (82 kg)	Sr	Bronx, NY
G	10	Bobby Joe Hatton	6 ft 2 in (1.88 m)	—	Fr	Ponce, Puerto Rico
G	13	Tomer Karni	6 ft 0 in (1.83 m)	183 lb (83 kg)	So	Israel
G	14	Randy Encarnacion	6 ft 0 in (1.83 m)	—	Jr	Jersey City, NJ
G	20	Joe Taylor	6 ft 3 in (1.91 m)	—	So	Albany, NY
C	24	Alan Tomidy	6 ft 11 in (2.11 m)	215 lb (98 kg)	Sr	Le Roy, NY
G	33	Chris Grill	6 ft 4 in (1.93 m)	—	Jr	Wichita, KS
F	34	Lucas Pisarczyk	6 ft 8 in (2.03 m)	200 lb (91 kg)	Jr
F	40	Bryan Whittle	6 ft 6 in (1.98 m)	—	So	Bronx, NY
F	44	Kareem Hill	6 ft 7 in (2.01 m)	199 lb (90 kg)	Sr	Seattle, WA
F	52	Scott McCabe	6 ft 8 in (2.03 m)	—	Sr
F	54	Dawan Bethea	6 ft 8 in (2.03 m)	—	Fr

Head coach

- Dave Magarity (Saint Francis (PA))

Assistant coach(es)

- Jeff Bower
- Steven Sauers

Legend

- (C) Team captain
- (S) Suspended
- (I) Ineligible
- (W) Walk-on
- Injured
- Current redshirt

Roster
Last update: January 7, 2021

== Schedule and results ==
Date time, TV	Rank^{#}	Opponent^{#}	Result	Record	Site (attendance) city, state
Regular season
November 25, 1995*		at Northeastern	W 73–55	1–0	Matthews Arena; Boston, Massachusetts
December 1, 1995*		Hampton; Pepsi Marist Classic	W 87–69	2–0	McCann Recreation Center; Poughkeepsie, New York
December 2, 1995*		Brown; Pepsi Marist Classic	W 59–56	3–0	McCann Recreation Center (3791); Poughkeepsie, New York
December 6, 1995*		at Siena	W 49–47	4–0	Times Union Center (2147); Albany, New York
December 16, 1995*		Northeastern	W 86–65	5–0	McCann Recreation Center (3112); Poughkeepsie, New York
December 28, 1995*		at Louisiana State University	L 65–80	5–1	Maravich Assembly Center; Baton Rouge, Louisiana
January 3, 1996*		Manhattan	W 68–65	6–1	McCann Recreation Center (3281); Poughkeepsie, New York
January 6, 1996		Robert Morris	W 65–55	7–1 (1–0)	McCann Recreation Center (3406); Poughkeepsie, New York
January 9, 1996		Saint Francis (PA)	W 67–50	8–1 (2–0)	McCann Recreation Center; Poughkeepsie, New York
January 11, 1996		at Long Island	W 86–69	9–1 (3–0)	Schwartz Athletic Center; Brooklyn, New York
January 13, 1996		Rider	W 89–73	10–1 (4–0)	McCann Recreation Center (3688); Poughkeepsie, New York
January 17, 1996		at Fairleigh Dickinson	W 70–57	11–1 (5–0)	Rothman Center; Hackensack, New Jersey
January 20, 1996		St. Francis (NY)	W 72–57	12–1 (6–0)	McCann Recreation Center (3738); Poughkeepsie, New York
January 22, 1996		Wagner	W 100–85	13–1 (7–0)	McCann Recreation Center (3414); Poughkeepsie, New York
January 25, 1996		at Monmouth	W 81–75	14–1 (8–0)	William T. Boylan Gymnasium (2500); West Long Branch, New Jersey
January 27, 1996		Mount St. Mary's	L 55–61	14–2 (8–1)	McCann Recreation Center (3944); Poughkeepsie, New York
January 31, 1996		at Robert Morris	W 77–70	15–2 (9–1)	Charles L. Sewall Center (639); Moon Township, Pennsylvania
February 3, 1996*		vs. Fairfield	W 80–69	16–2	Madison Square Garden; New York City, New York
February 5, 1996		at Saint Francis (PA)	L 65–67 ^{OT}	16–3 (9–2)	DeGol Arena (873); Loretto, Pennsylvania
February 8, 1996		Long Island	W 104–74	17–3 (10–2)	McCann Recreation Center (2417); Poughkeepsie, New York
February 10, 1996		at Rider	L 67–80	17–4 (10–3)	Alumni Gymnasium (1650); Lawrenceville, New Jersey
February 14, 1996		Fairleigh Dickinson	W 79–69	18–4 (11–3)	McCann Recreation Center (2623); Poughkeepsie, New York
February 17, 1996		at St. Francis (NY)	W 52–43	19–4 (12–3)	Generoso Pope Athletic Complex (214); Brooklyn, NY
February 19, 1996		at Wagner	W 75–70	20–4 (13–3)	Sutter Gymnasium (480); Staten Island, NY
February 24, 1996		at Mount St. Mary's	L 64–74	20–5 (13–4)	Knott Arena; Emmitsburg, Maryland
February 26, 1996		Monmouth	W 56–49	21–5 (14–4)	McCann Recreation Center (3714); Poughkeepsie, New York
NEC tournament
March 1, 1996	(2)	(10) Robert Morris; Quarterfinals	W 70–51	22–5	McCann Recreation Center (3416); Poughkeepsie, New York
March 4, 1996	(2)	(3) Monmouth; Semifinals	L 56–57	22–6	McCann Recreation Center (3499); Poughkeepsie, New York
NIT tournament
March 13, 1996*		Rhode Island; 1st round	L 77–82	22–7	Keaney Gymnasium; Kingston, Rhode Island
*Non-conference game. ^{#}Rankings from AP Poll. (#) Tournament seedings in parentheses. All times are in Eastern.
