= John S. Burke Catholic High School =

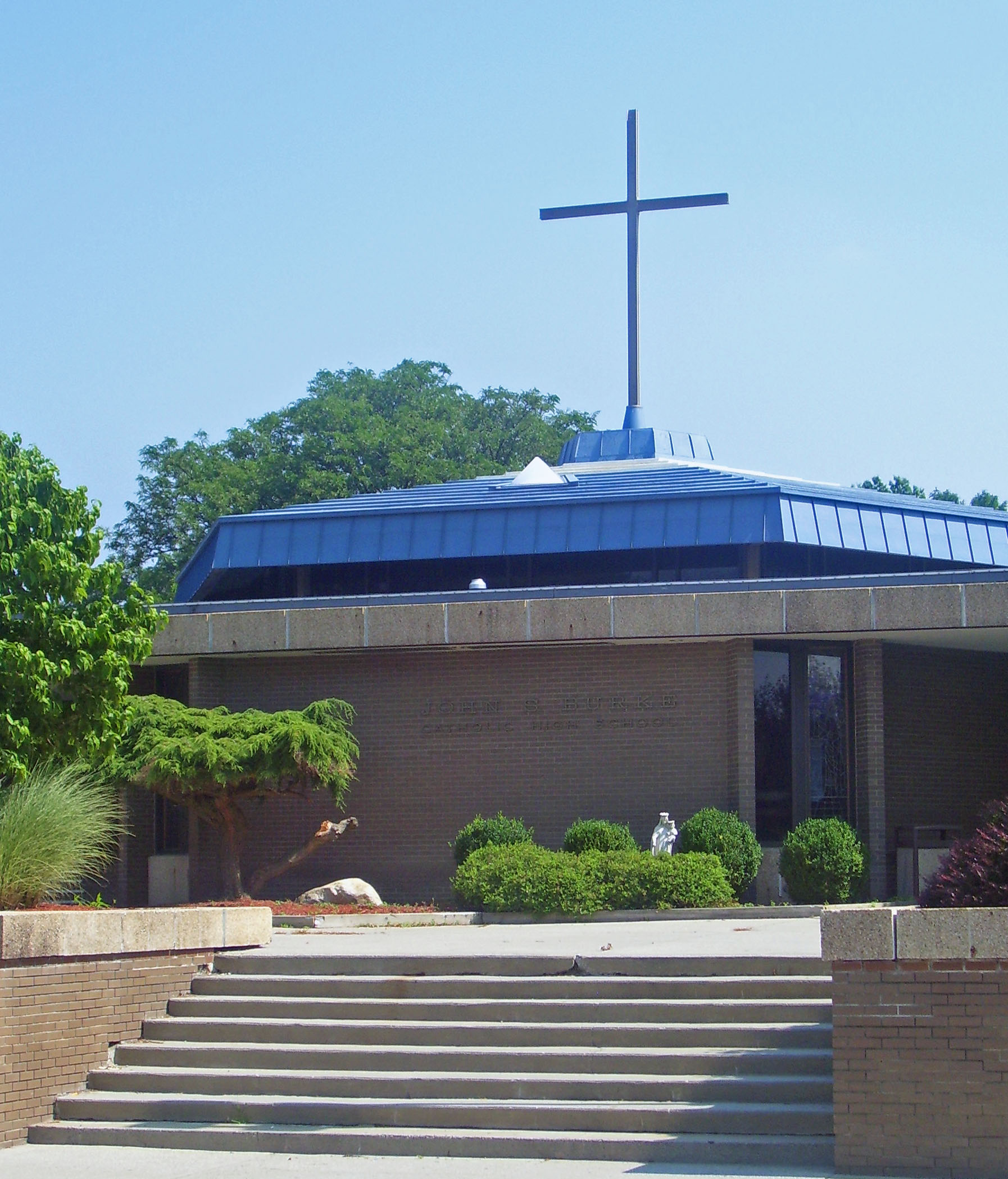
- Front entrance and grotto

Location
- 80 Fletcher Street; Goshen, (Orange County), New York 10924; United States; 41°24′35″N 74°20′31″W

Information
- Other names: Burke Catholic High School; Burke Catholic; Burke Catholic Academy
- Former names: St. John's Academic School; Garr Institute; St. John's High School
- Type: Private, co-educational
- Motto: Non Vox Sed Votum (Not Words But Deeds)
- Religious affiliation: Roman Catholic
- Established: 1899 (127 years ago)
- CEEB code: 332140
- Principal: John Douthit and Janice Clark
- Grades: 9–12
- Enrollment: 373 (as of 2023-2024)
  - Grade 9: 107
  - Grade 10: 102
  - Grade 11: 70
  - Grade 12: 94
- Student to teacher ratio: 13.4
- Colors: Navy blue and white
- Sports: Baseball, basketball, cheerleading, cross-country running, football, golf, lacrosse, soccer, softball, swimming, tennis, track and field, girls' volleyball, wrestling
- Mascot: Eagle
- Team name: Eagles
- Accreditation: Middle States Association of Colleges and Schools; National Catholic Education Association
- Newspaper: The Windmill
- Website: burkecatholic.com

John S. Burke Catholic High School, referred to locally as Burke Catholic or as Burke Catholic Academy, is an American private, Roman Catholic high school and middle school in Goshen, New York, and is located within the Roman Catholic Archdiocese of New York. Burke Catholic is the only Catholic high school located in Orange County. The school's colors are blue and white, with its sports teams, the Burke Catholic Eagles, carrying on those colors. Occasionally, silver is added to the school's colors. The school motto is Non Vox Sed Votum, Latin for "Not Words But Deeds". John Douthit and Janice Clark have been the school's principals since 2017. The school gets their uniforms from FlynnO'Hara.

In May 2008, connecting acres of land to the school were bought by the archdiocese.

== History ==
The school was established in 1899. It was originally staffed by the Sisters of Charity and previously called St. John's Academic School, Garr Institute and St. John's High School.

In 1963, a new building was built at its current location and renamed for John Stephen Burke, a New York City philanthropist.

General Martin Dempsey, a 1970 graduate of Burke Catholic and former Chairman of the Joint Chiefs of Staff, delivered the commencement address at the class of 2012's graduation held at West Point.

=== Addition of Burke Catholic Academy ===
In September 8, 2021, Burke Catholic High School made an addition to their school accommodating middle schoolers, the program being known as Burke Catholic Academy. At the school, the younger middle school students have their own wing, but use rooms like art and gymnasium spaces with the high school students. They have also started a modified sports program just for the middle school kids.

== Demographics ==
In the 2016–2017 school year, there is a total of 400 students attending Burke Catholic. The student-teacher ratio is 16.1.

== Operating independently of the archdiocese ==
On January 27, 2009, it was announced that the Archdiocese of New York would allow all Catholic high schools to operate independently, including John S. Burke Catholic High School. The archdiocese said this action stemmed from a desire for a more efficient operation of the schools and that a local, independent board of directors would oversee the activities of the school.
