= Jared Jordan =

American basketball player (born 1984)

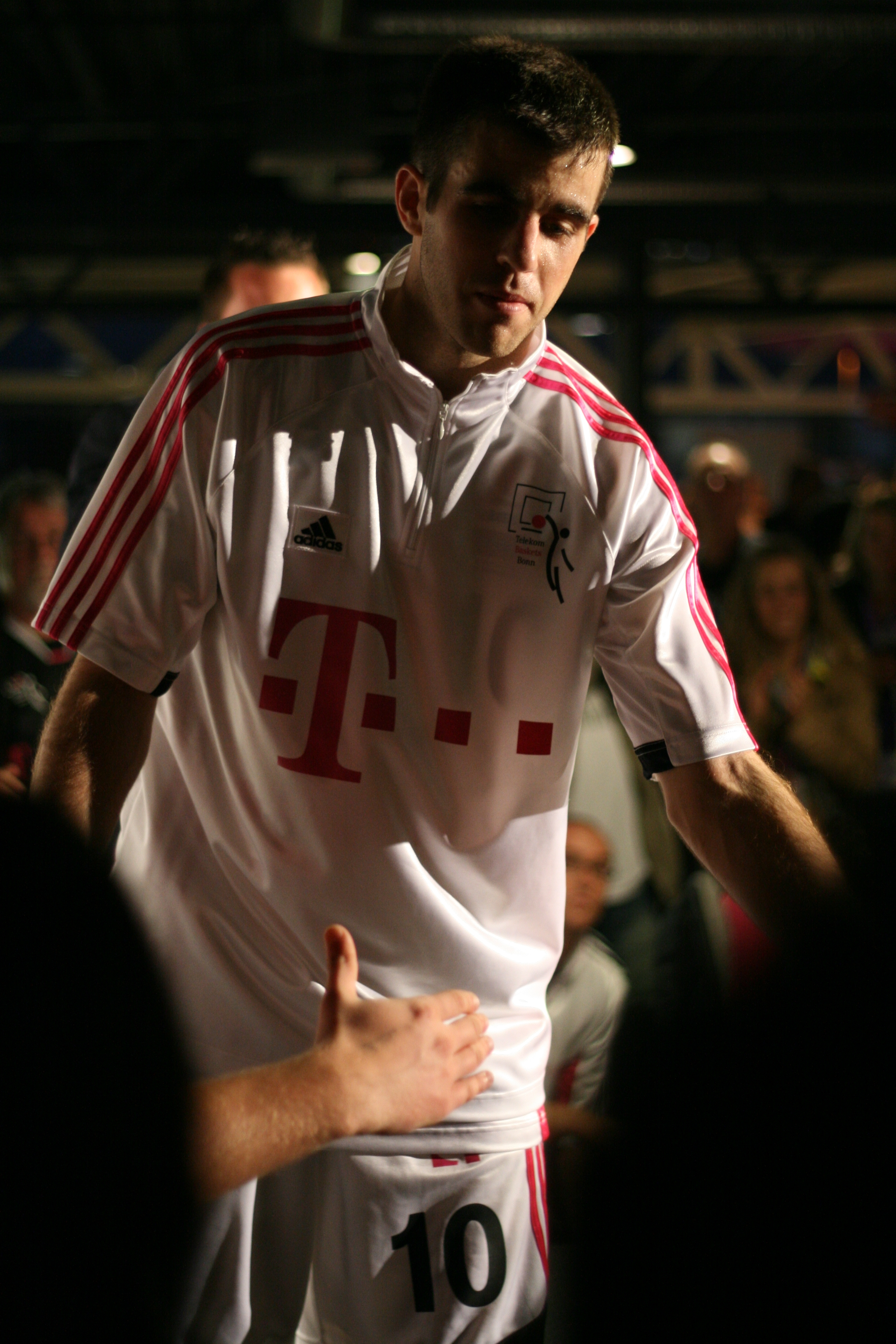
- Jordan with Telekom Baskets Bonn in 2009

Personal information
- Born: October 14, 1984 (age 42) Hartford, Connecticut, U.S.
- Listed height: 6 ft 2 in (1.88 m)
- Listed weight: 187 lb (85 kg)

Career information
- High school: Kingswood-Oxford School (West Hartford, Connecticut)
- College: Marist (2003–2007)
- NBA draft: 2007: 2nd round, 45th overall pick
- Drafted by: Los Angeles Clippers
- Playing career: 2007–2020
- Position: Point guard

Career history
- 2007–2008: Lietuvos rytas
- 2008–2009: Rio Grande Valley Vipers
- 2009–2010: Telekom Baskets Bonn
- 2010–2011: Kolossos Rodou
- 2011–2014: Telekom Baskets Bonn
- 2014: Brose Baskets
- 2014–2015: San Sebastián Gipuzkoa
- 2015–2018: Tigers Tübingen
- 2019–2020: CSU Sibiu

Career highlights
- FIBA Europe Cup assists leader (2020); All-Bundesliga First Team (2013); 2× All-Bundesliga Second Team (2012, 2014); 3× Bundesliga assists leader (2016–2018); Greek League assists leader (2011); Liga ACB assists leader (2015); AP Honorable Mention All-American (2007); 2× NCAA assists leader (2006, 2007); Haggerty Award (2007); MAAC Player of the Year (2007)
- Stats at Basketball Reference

Jared Ahern Jordan (born October 14, 1984) is an American former professional basketball player for various teams in Basketball Bundesliga (BBL). He last played for CSU Sibiu of the Liga Națională in Romania during the 2019–20 season.

== College career ==
Jordan, who graduated from Kingswood-Oxford School in West Hartford, Connecticut in 2003, became the point guard for the Marist College basketball team until his graduation in 2007. Wearing #25, and nicknamed "The Magician", he led the nation for two years in a row in assists, the only NCAA Division I player to do so since Avery Johnson, the former head coach of the New Jersey Nets. Jordan averaged 8.5 assists, 16.1 points, and 4.8 rebounds per game as a junior at Marist, and 8.7 assists, 17.2 points, and 5.9 rebounds per game as a senior. He became the all-time career assists leader at Marist, a record that still stands as of 2021.

He won the 74th Haggerty Award as the 2006–07 All-Met Division I men's college basketball player of the year.

== Professional career ==
On June 28, 2007, Jordan was selected 45th in the 2007 NBA draft by the Los Angeles Clippers, then played in the 2007 NBA Summer League in Las Vegas, in which he averaged 4.2 points and 4.8 assists in five games (all starts).

On September 30, the Clippers traded him to the New York Knicks for cash. Jordan played a total of eight minutes in three preseason games for the Knicks, who waived him on October 25.

On December 3, Jordan signed a contract with BC Lietuvos Rytas in Lithuania. He was released from the team after the season ended.

In July 2008, the Phoenix Suns announced that Jordan would play in the team's 2008 NBA Summer League games. Coming off the bench in five games, he averaged 3.2 points, 2.6 assists and 14.6 minutes.

On September 27, 2008, the New Orleans Hornets signed Jordan to a non-guaranteed training camp contract. The guard played in two games and averaged 3.0 points and 3.0 assists in preseason play. On October 22, the team cut him from its roster.

On December 17, 2008, Jordan signed on with the Rio Grande Valley Vipers, an NBA Development League team based in Hidalgo, Texas. He played his first game in a Vipers uniform the following day, notching two assists in an 89–80 victory over the Tulsa 66ers. Over the season, he led the league in assists per 48 minutes (13.7) and ranked second in assists per game (8.8) and assists per turnover (3.29). He set the Vipers' record for assists in a game (21 in a 122–116 victory over Fort Wayne on Feb. 26).

On June 30, 2009, the Golden State Warriors announced that he would play for their 2009 NBA Summer League team in Las Vegas.

In mid-summer 2009, Jordan signed a one-year contract to play for Telekom Baskets Bonn in Germany, where he averaged 9.0 points and 5.3 assists per game in the BBL.

In September 2010 he signed with Colossus Rhodes in Greece.

In July 2011, Jordan returned to Telekom Baskets Bonn under a two-season contract. He left them in February 2014, and signed with Brose Baskets for the rest of the season with an option for next year.

In August 2014, he signed a one-year deal with San Sebastián Gipuzkoa BC of the Spanish Liga ACB.

On August 6, 2015, Jordan signed with JDA Dijon of the French LNB Pro A league. However, the next month he left Dijon before appearing in a game for them. On November 15, 2015, he signed a short-term contract with the German club Tigers Tübingen. On December 23, 2015, he re-signed with Tübingen until the end of the 2016–17 season.

Since February 25, 2017, Jordan has led the BBL's all-time assists list. With his 1,458th assist, he passed the previous record holder, Dru Joyce.

== See also ==
- List of NCAA Division I men's basketball season assists leaders
