= Marist Red Foxes men's basketball =

2025–26 Marist Red Foxes men's basketball team
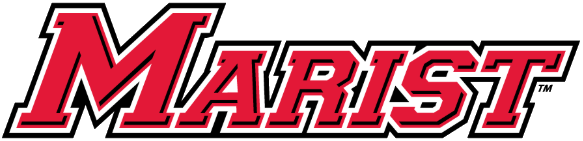
- University: Marist University
- First season: 1961–62
- Athletic director: Tim Murray
- Head coach: John Dunne (8th season)
- Location: Poughkeepsie, New York, United States
- Arena: McCann Arena (capacity: 3,200)
- Conference: MAAC
- Nickname: Red Foxes
- Colors: Red and white
- All-time record: 528–678 (.438) Division I

NCAA Division I tournament appearances
- 1986, 1987

Conference tournament champions
- NEC: 1986, 1987

Conference regular-season champions
- 2002, 2007; NEC: 1985, 1987

Uniforms
Home	Away

For information on all Marist University sports, see Marist Red Foxes

The Marist Red Foxes men's basketball team is the basketball team that represents Marist University in Poughkeepsie, New York, United States. The school's team currently competes in the Metro Atlantic Athletic Conference. The Red Foxes have qualified for the NCAA tournament twice (1986, 1987), losing in the first round in both instances. Prior to joining the MAAC in 1997, Marist was a charter member of the ECAC Metro Conference in 1981; which became the Northeast Conference in 1988.

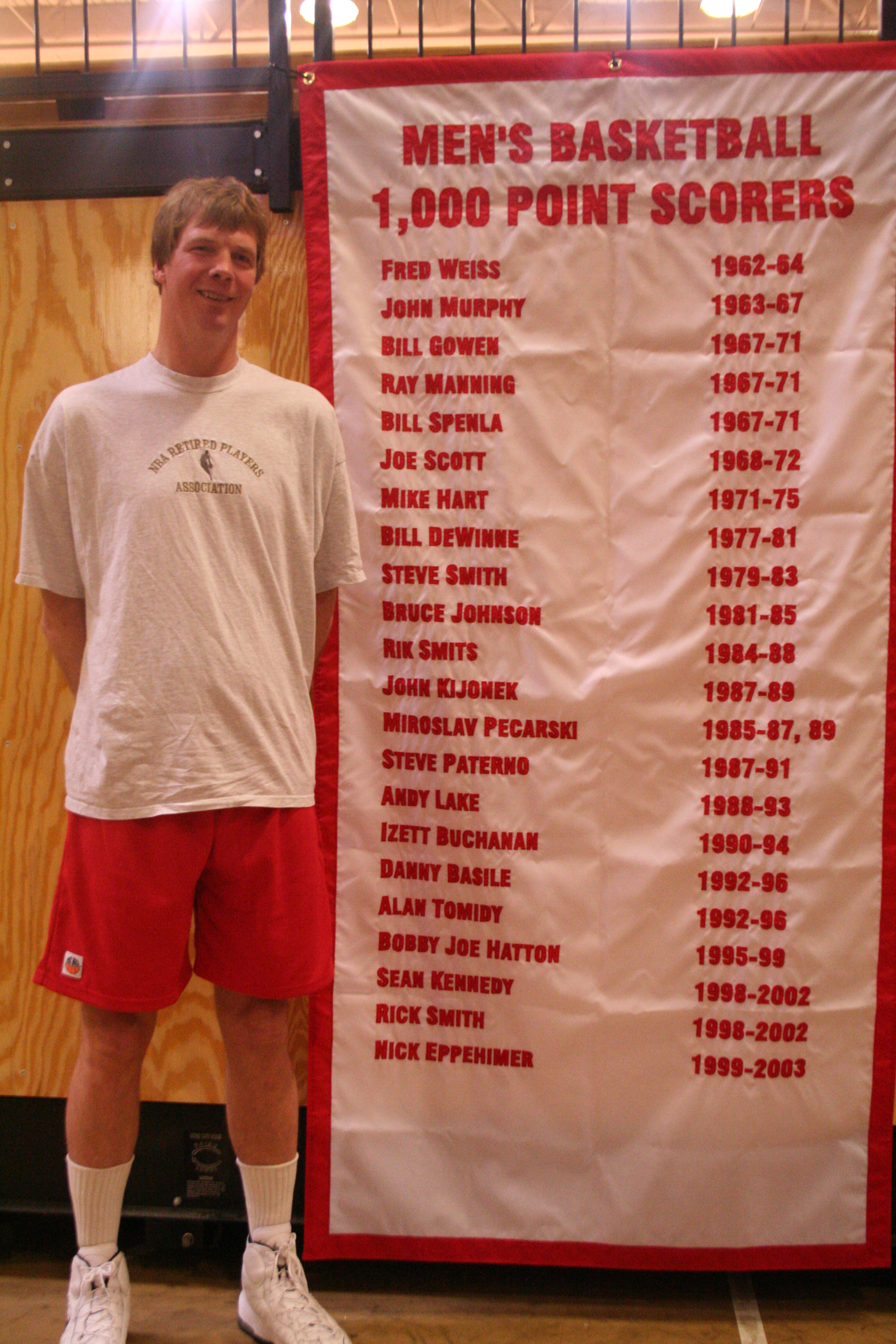
Rik Smits visits Marist on Alumni Day

== History ==
The Marist men's basketball team's first varsity season was 1961–62 at the NCAA Division III level. For 20 years Marist would play at this level. Their most successful season during this time was the 1970–71 season under head coach Ron Petro, in which they went 21–7. The Marist Athletic Department including the men's basketball program transitioned up to the Division I level before the 1981–82 season. In response to the competitive landscape the program encountered in Division I for basketball recruits Marist became one of the first college programs to recruit players from overseas. This strategy worked and Marist was able to attract very talented international players to Poughkeepsie. This led to unprecedented on the court success and national recognition for the school. The most successful Marist men's basketball teams played in the mid-1980s and were composed mostly of players from Europe and Canada. They were led by future first-round selection and NBA All-Star Rik Smits, who was originally from the Netherlands. Also on those teams was Rudy Bourgarel and Alain Forestier from France, Peter Krasovec from Hungary, Curtis Celestine from Canada and Serbian player Miroslav Pecarski. At the time, Pecarski was considered by some to be Europe's top 17-year-old player, but he was injured in the preseason, creating an opportunity for Smits.

During the 1984–85 season, Marist hosted eventual national champion Villanova, losing 57–51. That same year Marist would earn its first ECAC Metro Conference regular season championship. That team was coached by Matthew Furjanic Jr., whose staff also included Jim Todd, who would go on to become head coach of the Los Angeles Clippers.

In 1986 and 1987 Marist won the ECAC Metro Conference tournament and advanced to play in the NCAA tournament. In the 1986 NCAA Tournament, Marist lost 68–53 against a Georgia Tech team which would send four members of its starting lineup to the NBA. The 1987 team was Dave Magarity’s first year as head coach of the Red Foxes. The team won 20 games for the first time in its Division I history and lost to University of Pittsburgh in the NCAA first round. Magarity’s staff included Jeff Bower, formerly the general manager and head coach of the NBA’s New Orleans Hornets.

After graduating, Rik Smits was drafted #2 overall in the first round of the 1988 NBA draft, and become the first Marist player to play in the NBA. He would go on to have a long and successful career with the Indiana Pacers.

Marist lost in the first round of the 1996 NIT to Rhode Island. The 1995–96 team was led by 6'11" center Alan Tomidy, a native of Le Roy, New York and first team all New York Metropolitan, NEC and Haggerty Award Finalist, who averaged 18.8 pts and 11.3 rebounds per game. Other players of note were shooting forward Kareem Hill (13.7 pts and 8.7 rbs/game) and guard Danny Basile (15 pts/game), who combined for 55 points in that NIT loss.

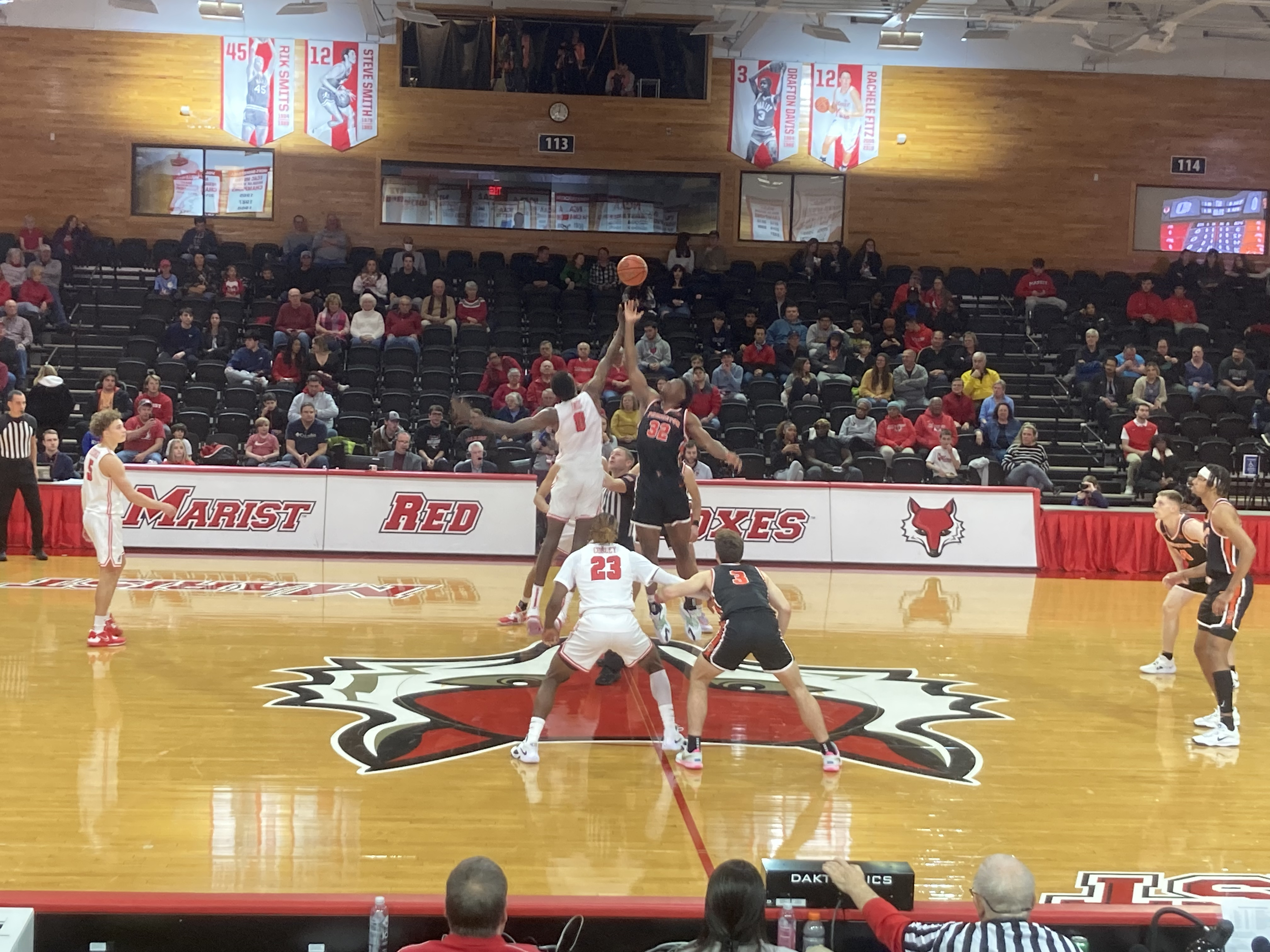
Marist men's basketball vs Princeton University

Since joining the MAAC in 1997, Marist has not won a conference tournament title nor qualified for an NCAA berth, although they won the MAAC regular season title twice (shared 2002, outright 2007). Not coincidentally, each of those teams possessed outstanding guard play; Sean Kennedy in 2002 and Jared Jordan in 2007.

The 2006–07 season featured point guard Jared Jordan, 7' center James Smith and shooting guard Will Whittington. Jordan led the nation in assists for the second straight year while Whittington, a three-point shooting specialist, contributed 17.6 pts/game. Whittington finished his Marist career with 362 three-pointers, and Jordan finished his career with 813 assists, both still program records.

In March, 2007, the men's basketball team defeated Oklahoma State in the first round of the NIT 67–64.

On June 28, 2007, Jared Jordan became the second Marist College basketball player to be selected in the NBA draft, as the 45th overall pick, 15th pick in the second round by the Los Angeles Clippers.

Two Marist players have won the Haggerty Award, Izett Buchanan in 1994 and Jared Jordan in 2007. The award is given annually to the Metropolitan area's top men's Division I basketball player.

== Head coaches ==
On April 10, 2013, Jeff Bower was named the tenth Head Coach in Marist's Division I history replacing Chuck Martin who was fired on March 14.

One June 2, 2014, after leading Marist to a 12–19 record in one season, Bower resigned his position to become General Manager of the Detroit Pistons of the NBA. On June 17, 2014, Mike Maker was hired as the eleventh head coach. Maker was previously the head coach at Division III Williams College where over six seasons he led the Ephs to a 147–32 (.821) record and three Division III Final Fours, twice getting to the title game. However, Maker was fired on March 5, 2018, after winning 28 games over four seasons.

On April 3, 2018, John Dunne was hired as the 12th coach of Marist, being hired from MAAC rival Saint Peter's.

== Postseason ==
=== NCAA tournament results ===
The Red Foxes have appeared in two NCAA Tournaments. Their combined record is 0–2.

Year	Round	Opponent	Result
1986	First Round	Georgia Tech	L 53–68
1987	First Round	Pittsburgh	L 68–93

=== NIT results ===
The Red Foxes have appeared in two National Invitation Tournaments. Their combined record is 1–2.

Year	Round	Opponent	Result
1996	First Round	Rhode Island	L 77–82
2007	First Round; Second Round	Oklahoma State; NC State	W 67–64; L 66–69

=== NAIA tournament results ===
The Red Foxes have appeared in the NAIA Tournament once. Their combined record is 0–1.

Year	Round	Opponent	Result
1973	First round	Xavier (La.)	L 65–81

== Year-by-year results ==
Overall total reflects only Division I seasons

Season	Overall	Conference	Standing	Postseason
Central Atlantic Collegiate Conference
George Sturba (1961–1962)
1961–62	6–7			
George Sturba (1 yr)	6–7 (.462)			
Tom Wade (1962–1964)
1962–63	14–9			
1963–64	4–15			
Tom Wade (2 yrs)	18–24 (.429)			
Paul Arnold (1964–1966)
1964–65	6–17			
1965–66	6–17			
Paul Arnold (2 yrs)	12–34 (.261)			
Ron Petro (1966–1984)
1966–67	9–16			
1967–68	11–13	4–2		CAAC Champions
1968–69	17–10	7–1		CAAC Champions
1969–70	15–9	4–2		
1970–71	21–7	7–1		CAAC Champions
1971–72	16–9	8–2		
1972–73	15–12	6–4		NAIA first round
1973–74	9–16	3–5		
1974–75	16–10	6–4		
1975–76	15–10	9–3		
1976–77	7–15	5–8		
1977–78	7–19			
Big Apple Conference
1978–79	8–16	4–6		First Division II season
1979–80	9–17	4–6		
1980–81	12–15	9–3		
ECAC Metro North
1981–82	12–14	6–9	5th	First Division I season
1982–83	14–15	7–7	4th	
1983–84	14–15	8–8	5th	
Ron Petro (18 yrs)	226–238 (.487)	97–71 (.577)		
Ron Petro (DI 3 yrs)	40–44 (.476)	21–24 (.467)		
Matthew Furjanic Jr. (1984–1986)
1984–85	17–12	11–3	1st	
1985–86	19–12	11–5	2nd	NCAA round of 64
Matt Furjanic (2 yrs)	36–24 (.600)	22–8 (.733)		
Dave Magarity (1986–2004)
1986–87	20–10	15–1	1st	NCAA round of 64
1987–88	18–9	13–3	T-1st	
Northeast Conference
1988–89	13–15	9–7	4th	
1989–90	17–11	10–6	T-3rd	
1990–91	6–22	4–12	T-7th	
1991–92	10–20	6–10	7th	
1992–93	14–16	10–8	T-3rd	
1993–94	14–13	10–8	T-5th	
1994–95	17–11	12–6	T-2nd	
1995–96	22–7	14–4	T-2nd	NIT 1st Round
1996–97	6–22	4–14	9th	
Metro Atlantic Athletic Conference
1997–98	11–17	7–11	T-7th	
1998–99	16–12	8–10	6th	
1999–00	14–14	10–8	T-4th	
2000–01	17–13	11–7	T-4th	
2001–02	19–9	13–5	T-1st	
2002–03	13–16	8–10	6th	
2003–04	6–22	4–14	9th	
Dave Magarity (18 yrs)	253–259 (.494)	168–144 (.538)		
Matt Brady (2004–2008)
2004–05	11–17	8–10	T-7th	
2005–06	19–10	12–6	3rd	
2006–07	25–9	14–4	1st	NIT 2nd Round
2007–08	18–14	11–7	T-5th	
Matt Brady (4 yrs)	73–50 (.593)	45–27 (.625)		
Chuck Martin (2008–2013)
2008–09	10–23	4–14	T-9th	
2009–10	1–29	1–17	10th	
2010–11	6–27	3–15	T-9th	
2011–12	14–18	7–11	8th	
2012–13	10–21	6–12	8th	
Chuck Martin (5 yrs)	41–118 (.258)	21–69 (.233)		
Jeff Bower (2013–2014)
2013–14	12–19	9–11	T-6th	
Jeff Bower (1 yr)	12–19 (.387)	9–11 (.450)		
Mike Maker (2014–2018)
2014–15	7–25	5–15	T-10th	
2015–16	7–23	4–16	11th	
2016–17	8–24	5–15	T-10th	
2017–18	6–25	4–14	T-10th	
Mike Maker (4 yrs)	28–97 (.224)	18–60 (.231)		
John Dunne (2018–present)
2018–19	12–19	7–11	8th	
2019–20	7–23	6–14	11th	
2020–21	12–9	10–8	T-3rd	
2021–22	14–16	9–11	T-5th	
2022–23	13–20	6–14	11th	
2023–24	18–13	12–8	T-3rd	
John Dunne (6 yrs)	76–100 (.432)	50–66 (.431)		
Total:		559–711 (.440)		
National champion Postseason invitational champion Conference regular season champion Conference regular season and conference tournament champion Division regular season champion Division regular season and conference tournament champion Conference tournament champion

== Career Records ==
Active players in italics. * Updated through the 2021–22 season

Scoring leaders
Player	Pts
Chavaughn Lewis	2,119
Steve Smith	2,077
Rik Smits	1,945
Khallid Hart	1,879
Brian Parker	1,822
Izett Buchanan	1,593
Will Whittington	1,586
Danny Basile	1,555
Jared Jordan	1,538
Alan Tomidy	1,508

Rebound leaders
Player	Reb
Ted Taylor	923
Alan Tomidy	838
Adam Kemp	825
Rik Smits	811
Miroslav Pecarski	655
Ryan Stilphen	654
Chavaughn Lewis	636
Kareem Hill	627
Izett Buchanan	613
Brian Parker	606

Assist leaders
Player	Ast
Jared Jordan	813
Drafton Davis	804
Sean Kennedy	670
Bruce Johnson	658
Dexter Dunbar	455
Brian Parker	386
Bobby Joe Hatton	365
Danny Basile	341
Joey O'Connor	326
Chavaughn Lewis	308

Block leaders
Player	Blk
Rik Smits	345
Alan Tomidy	267
Adam Kemp	225
Tom Kenney	139
John Donovan	116
Kareem Hill	94
Jordan Jones	94
Miroslav Pecarski	78
Matt Tullis	77
Tomasz Cielebak	76

Steal leaders
Player	Stl
Drafton Davis	301
Bruce Johnson	299
Chavaughn Lewis	243
Sean Kennedy	212
Dexter Dunbar	182
Jared Jordan	160
Rick Smith	145
Joey O'Connor	140
Khallid Hart	138
Izett Buchanan	137

Three-point leaders
Player	3PM
Will Whittington	362
Ryan Funk	264
Danny Basile	239
Steve Paterno	224
Khallid Hart	215
Andy Lake	211
Devin Price	174
Nick Eppehimer	172
Brandon Ellerbee	163
Jared Jordan	154

Free throw percentage leaders
Player	M-A-%
Steve Eggink	172–194 .887
Danny Basile	298–342 .871
Bo Larragan	183–212 .863
David Bennett	179–209 .856
Nick Eppehimer	222–266 .835
Tom Meekins	95–114 .833
Andy Lake	188–228 .825
Khallid Hart	496–607 .817
Ryan Schneider	146–180 .811
Jay Bowie	163–201 .811

Free throws made leaders
Player	FTM
Chavaughn Lewis	543
Brian Parker	500
Khallid Hart	496
Alan Tomidy	446
Izett Buchanan	390
Rik Smits	383
Devin Price	300
Danny Basile	298
Jared Jordan	294
Bobby Joe Hatton	286

== Retired numbers ==
Marist Red Foxes retired numbers
No.	Player	Pos.	Tenure	Ref.
3	Drafton Davis	G	1984–88	
12	Steve Smith	G	1979–83	
45	Rik Smits	C	1984–88	

== Conference Player-of-Year winners ==
- 1983: Steve Smith (NEC)
- 1987: Rik Smits (NEC)
- 1988: Rik Smits (NEC)
- 1994: Izett Buchanan (NEC)
- 2007: Jared Jordan (MAAC)

== Red Foxes currently in professional basketball ==
- Chavaughn Lewis (born 1993), for Hapoel Galil Elyon of the Israeli Basketball Premier League

== Notable former players ==
- Jay Bowie
- Izett Buchanan
- Rik Smits
- Miroslav Pecarski
- Nick Eppehimer
- Bobby Joe Hatton
- Jared Jordan
- Adam Kemp
- Chavaughn Lewis
