= Speedy Morris =

American basketball coach (born 1942)

Biographical details
- Born: April 26, 1942 (age 84); Philadelphia, Pennsylvania, U.S.

Coaching career (HC unless noted)
- 1984–1986: La Salle (women's)
- 1986–2001: La Salle (men's)

Head coaching record
- Overall: 238–203 (men's); 43–17 (women's)
- Tournaments: Men's; 1–4 (NCAA Division I); 4–2 (NIT)

Accomplishments and honors

Championships
- Men's; 3 MAAC regular season (1988–1990); 4 MAAC tournament (1988–1990, 1992)

Awards
- Men's; 2x MAAC Coach of the Year (1988, 1989)

William "Speedy" Morris (born April 26, 1942) is an American basketball coach.

Born in Manayunk, Morris acquired the nickname "Speedy" because he was one of the slowest kids in his neighborhood. Morris started coaching at St. John the Baptist Catholic School's CYO varsity basketball team. He then went on to coach at Roman Catholic High School. Morris was then asked to be head coach of La Salle University's women's basketball team. He was head coach of the La Salle University men's team from 1986 to 2001, where he led the Explorers to four NCAA tournament appearances.

Morris's 238 wins are the most in school history. His best team was the 1989–90, led by Lionel Simmons and Doug Overton, which posted a 30–2 record and finished 12th in both major polls.

Morris was the first Division I coach to coach both the men's and women's program at the same school. While at La Salle, Morris coached future NBA players Simmons, Overton, Randy Woods, Tim Legler, and Rasual Butler. However, he was forced to resign in 2001 after eight straight losing seasons.

Soon afterward, Morris was hired at St. Joseph's Preparatory School in Philadelphia. The teams won Catholic League titles in 2002 and 2003. On February 7, 2011, he earned his 561st win in the Philadelphia Catholic League, the most of any coach in league history. On February 3, 2012, Morris earned his 900th win as Prep defeated Roman Catholic, a team he once coached. Morris is the first and only coach in Pennsylvania state history to win 300 games with two schools. He won his 1000th game on January 12, 2018. In December 2019, Morris announced that he would retire at the end of the season. He wanted to continue coaching, but his battle with Parkinson's disease had taken its toll on him.

== Head coaching record ==
=== College men's ===
Record table
Season	Team	Overall	Conference	Standing	Postseason
La Salle Explorers (Metro Atlantic Athletic Conference) (1986–1992)
1986–87	La Salle	20–13	10–4	2nd	NIT Runner-up
1987–88	La Salle	24–10	14–0	1st	NCAA Division I first round
1988–89	La Salle	26–6	13–1	1st	NCAA Division I first round
1989–90	La Salle	30–2	16–0	1st (South)	NCAA Division I second round
1990–91	La Salle	19–10	12–4	2nd	NIT first round
1991–92	La Salle	20–11	12–4	2nd	NCAA Division I first round
La Salle Explorers (Midwestern Collegiate Conference) (1992–1995)
1992–93	La Salle	14–13	9–5	3rd	
1993–94	La Salle	11–16	4–6	5th	
1994–95	La Salle	13–14	7–7	6th	
La Salle Explorers (Atlantic 10 Conference) (1995–2001)
1995–96	La Salle	6–24	3–13	T–5th (West)	
1996–97	La Salle	10–17	5–11	T–5th (West)	
1997–98	La Salle	9–18	5–11	T–4th (West)	
1998–99	La Salle	13–15	8–8	3rd (West)	
1999–00	La Salle	11–17	5–11	5th (West)	
2000–01	La Salle	12–17	5–11	8th	
La Salle:		238–203	128–96		
Total:		238–203			
National champion Postseason invitational champion Conference regular season champion Conference regular season and conference tournament champion Division regular season champion Division regular season and conference tournament champion Conference tournament champion
