= Keven McDonald =

American basketball player (1956–2026)

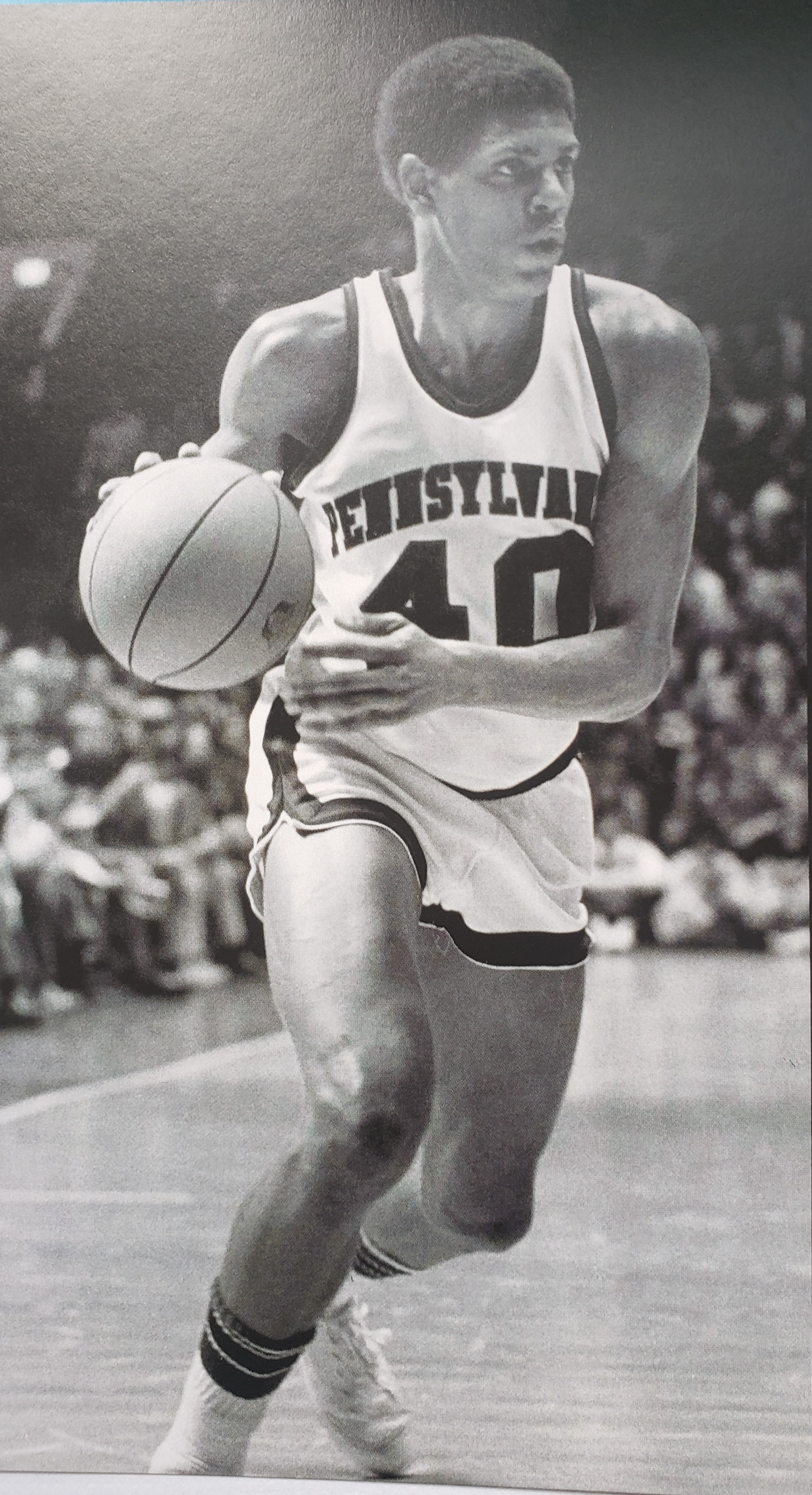

Personal information
- Born: June 2, 1956 Newark, New Jersey, U.S.
- Died: October 10, 2026 (aged 70)
- Listed height: 6 ft 5 in (1.96 m)
- Listed weight: 210 lb (95 kg)

Career information
- High school: Seton Hall Prep (West Orange, New Jersey)
- College: Penn (1975–1978)
- NBA draft: 1978: 2nd round, 42nd overall pick
- Drafted by: Seattle SuperSonics
- Position: Small forward
- Number: 40

Career highlights
- Ivy League Player of the Year (1978); 3× First-team All-Ivy League (1976–1978); Robert V. Geasey Trophy (1977); Ivy League Rookie of the Year (1976)
- Stats at Basketball Reference

Keven R. McDonald (June 2, 1956 – October 10, 2026) was an American professional basketball player known for his collegiate career at the University of Pennsylvania from 1974 to 1978 with the Penn Quakers men's basketball team. He won the Robert V. Geasey Trophy as a junior and was named the Ivy League Player of the Year as a senior. Following his career at Penn, McDonald was selected by the Seattle SuperSonics of the National Basketball Association (NBA) in the second round of the 1978 NBA draft. He went on to earn a J.D. degree from Rutgers Law School–Newark and became a licensed attorney and real estate investor in New Jersey.

== High school career ==
A native of Bloomfield, New Jersey, McDonald attended Seton Hall Prep where he was a standout on the basketball team, noted for his mature inside game and soft jumper from the outside. Sometimes dubbed "Mr. Everything", McDonald would rack up 1,774 career points, a school record which would stand until 2008 when it was broken by Ashton Gibbs. In a then-annual exhibition game (which pre-dated the McDonald's All-American Game), pitting all-stars from New York and New Jersey against the rest of the country, McDonald would outscore future-hall-of-famer Moses Malone. By the time he graduated in 1974, McDonald received interest from hundreds of college basketball teams with noted scholarship offers from USC and UCLA. Seton Hall Prep inducted McDonald into its Hall of Fame in 1987.

== College career ==
Wanting to stay close to home, McDonald gave serious consideration to offers from the U.S. Naval Academy and Princeton, but ultimately selected the University of Pennsylvania citing its strong academic reputation and good law school which he had an eye toward pursuing. Due to freshman eligibility rules, McDonald did not play on the varsity team in his first year at Penn. The team finished with a 23–5 overall record (13–1 in Ivy League) and was crowned conference champions. They lost in the first round of the 1975 NCAA Tournament to Kansas State.

McDonald played the small forward position for the Quakers during an era in which they were a nationally prominent basketball program. McDonald was pressed into a leadership role as a sophomore because Ron Haigler and Bob Bigelow had graduated. McDonald led Penn in scoring at 18.9 points per game, but the team finished in second place with a 17–9 overall record (11–3 Ivy). Penn's overall record was not enough to receive an at-large bid to the NCAA Tournament or an invite to the National Invitation Tournament. McDonald earned his first of three consecutive selections to the All-Ivy League and All-Big 5 teams.

In 1976–77, McDonald led the Quakers in both scoring (21.2) and rebounding (9.2) en route to being named the Robert V. Geasey Trophy recipient as the best player in Philadelphia Big 5 competition. The team finished in second place in the Ivy League again with an 18–8 (12–2 Ivy) record. That year was also head coach Chuck Daly's final one at Penn, a position he had held since 1971–72. Daly was later inducted into the Naismith Memorial Basketball Hall of Fame.

Penn improved during McDonald's senior season in 1977–78, when he led the team in scoring for a third straight year at 22.3 points per game. The Quakers finished at 20–8 (12–2 Ivy), earned a berth into the 1978 NCAA Tournament. In the first round of the tournament, a victory against St. Bonaventure, McDonald scored a career high 37 points and grabbed 13 rebounds, which are both school records for the tournament. In the second round (Sweet 16), with McDonald hampered by early foul trouble, the Quakers lost a close game in the final minutes to eventual tournament runner-up Duke. McDonald was voted as the Ivy League Player of the Year.

McDonald is one of the most accomplished players in the history of the Penn Quakers basketball program. His 1,644 career points total is fourth on the all-time list (two of those ahead of him had four years of eligibility). He is second in points per game behind Ernie Beck. In 1985, the Big 5 honored him by inducting him into its Hall of Fame. The Ivy League placed McDonald in its 2018 Class of Legends of Ivy League Basketball for his lasting contributions to his basketball program, university and chosen profession. In 2019, Penn inducted McDonald into its Athletics Hall of Fame.

== Professional career ==
McDonald was selected by the Seattle SuperSonics (now known as the Oklahoma City Thunder) in the second round of the 1978 NBA draft with the 42nd overall pick. The SuperSonics, who were coming off of an appearance in the NBA Finals and on the verge of the franchise's only championship, did not keep any of their rookies that year. McDonald was released by head coach Lenny Wilkens on September 30, 1978, and instead played overseas. McDonald played 34 games for Finnish club Turun NMKY, helping the team win silver in the Korisliiga for the 1978–79 season.

In 1979, McDonald tried out for the San Diego Clippers and the following year with the Philadelphia 76ers where his former college head coach Chuck Daly was then an assistant coach, but was not picked up by either team. McDonald played a few games for the Lancaster Red Roses in the CBA during the 1979–80 season, the final season of the franchise.

== Post-athletic career ==
After being cut by the Clippers, McDonald took a job as a stockbroker in San Francisco. McDonald would continue to work in various aspects of financial services and studied law at Rutgers Law School–Newark while holding a full-time job. McDonald received his Juris Doctor from Rutgers and was a licensed New Jersey attorney. He also owned and operated McDonald Properties, LLC, a real estate investment company.

McDonald died on October 10, 2026, at the age of 70.
