= Robert V. Geasey Trophy =

Men's college basketball award

- Awarded for: the most valuable men's basketball player in the Philadelphia Big 5
- Location: Philadelphia, Pennsylvania
- Country: United States
- Presented by: Herb Good Basketball Club

History
- First award: 1956
- Most recent: Derek Simpson, Saint Joseph's
- Website: Official website

The Robert V. Geasey Trophy is awarded to the most valuable men's basketball player in the Philadelphia Big 5, an informal association of college athletic programs in Philadelphia, Pennsylvania, United States. The trophy does not represent the entire regular season's most valuable player, the award goes simply to the best basketball player for Big 5 games played that season. It has been given since 1956 and is granted by the Herb Good Basketball Club, which is composed of local media members who cover the Big 5. From the Philadelphia Big 5's inception until 2023, members included La Salle University, the University of Pennsylvania, Saint Joseph's University, Temple University and Villanova University. In April 2023, Drexel University officially joined as the sixth member, but the association retains its Big 5 branding. Through at least the 1981–82 season, the most valuable player award was sometimes also known to be presented with the Michael Saxe Trophy, named after the first head coach in Villanova men's basketball history (1920–1926).

== Key ==
| † | Co-Players of the Year |
| * | Awarded a national player of the year award that same season: Sporting News; Oscar Robertson Trophy; Associated Press; NABC; Naismith; Wooden |
| Player (X) | Denotes the number of times the player has been awarded the Robert V. Geasey Trophy at that point |

== Winners ==
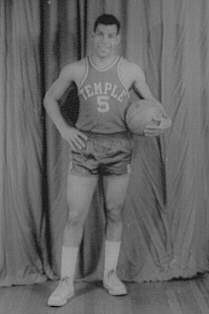
Guy Rodgers, Temple, 1956 through 1958

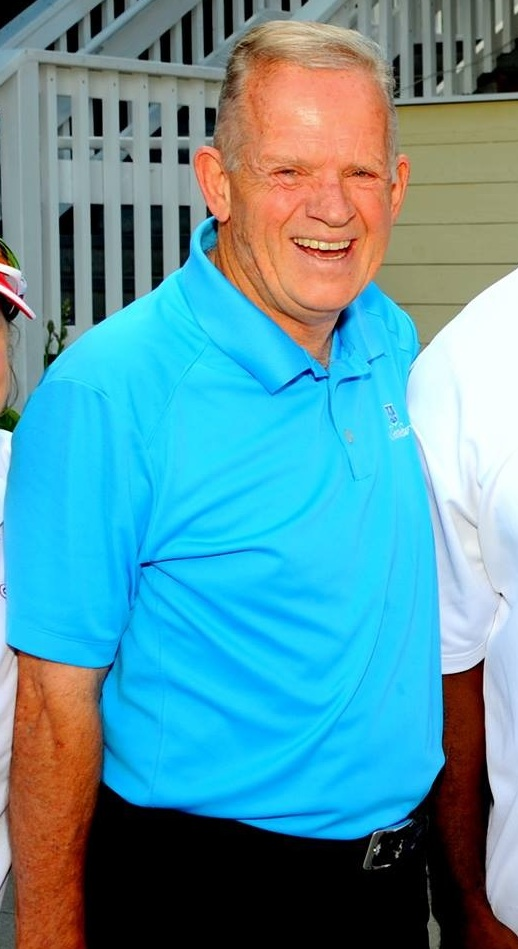
Jim Lynam, Saint Joseph's, 1963

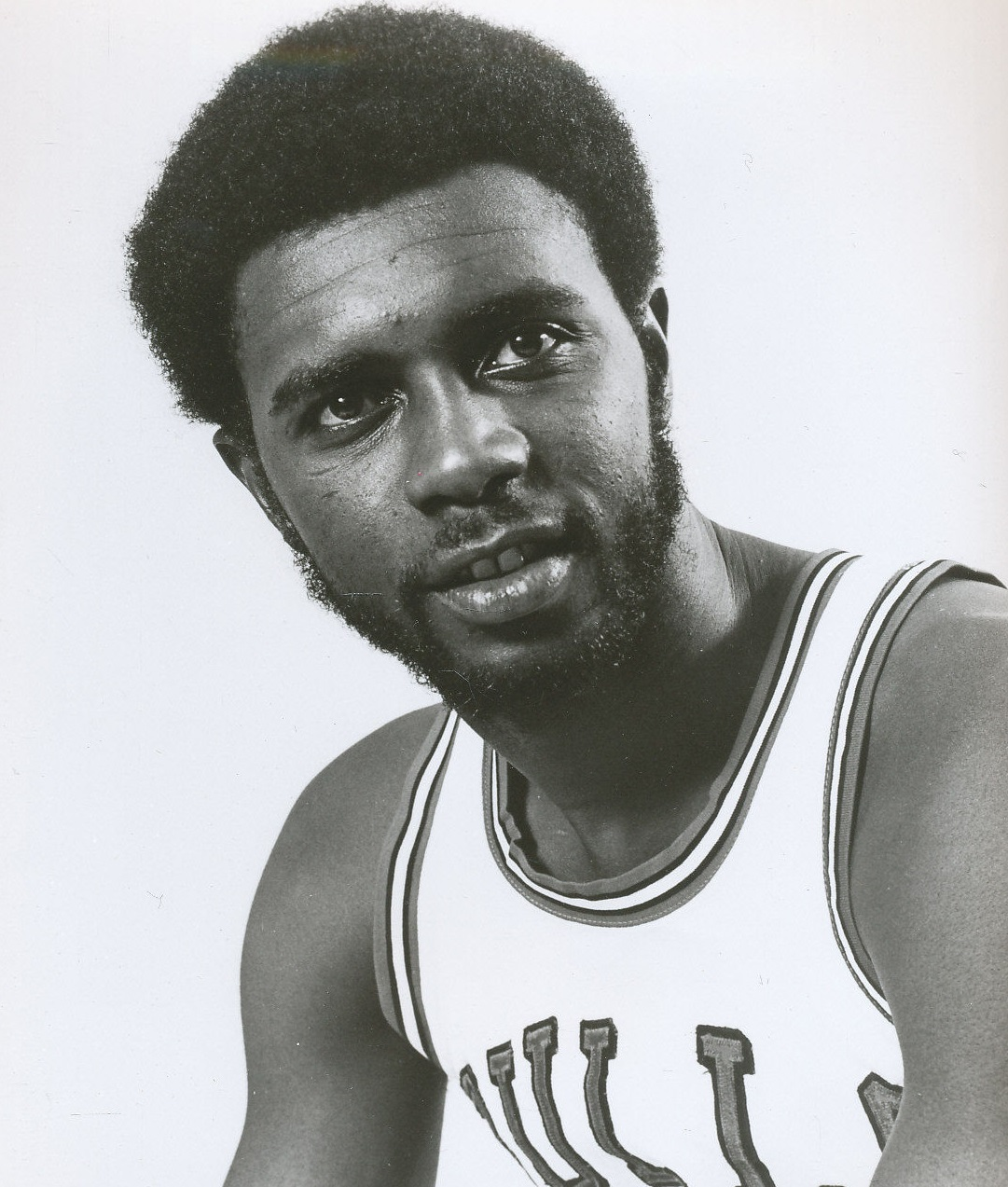
Howard Porter, Villanova, 1969

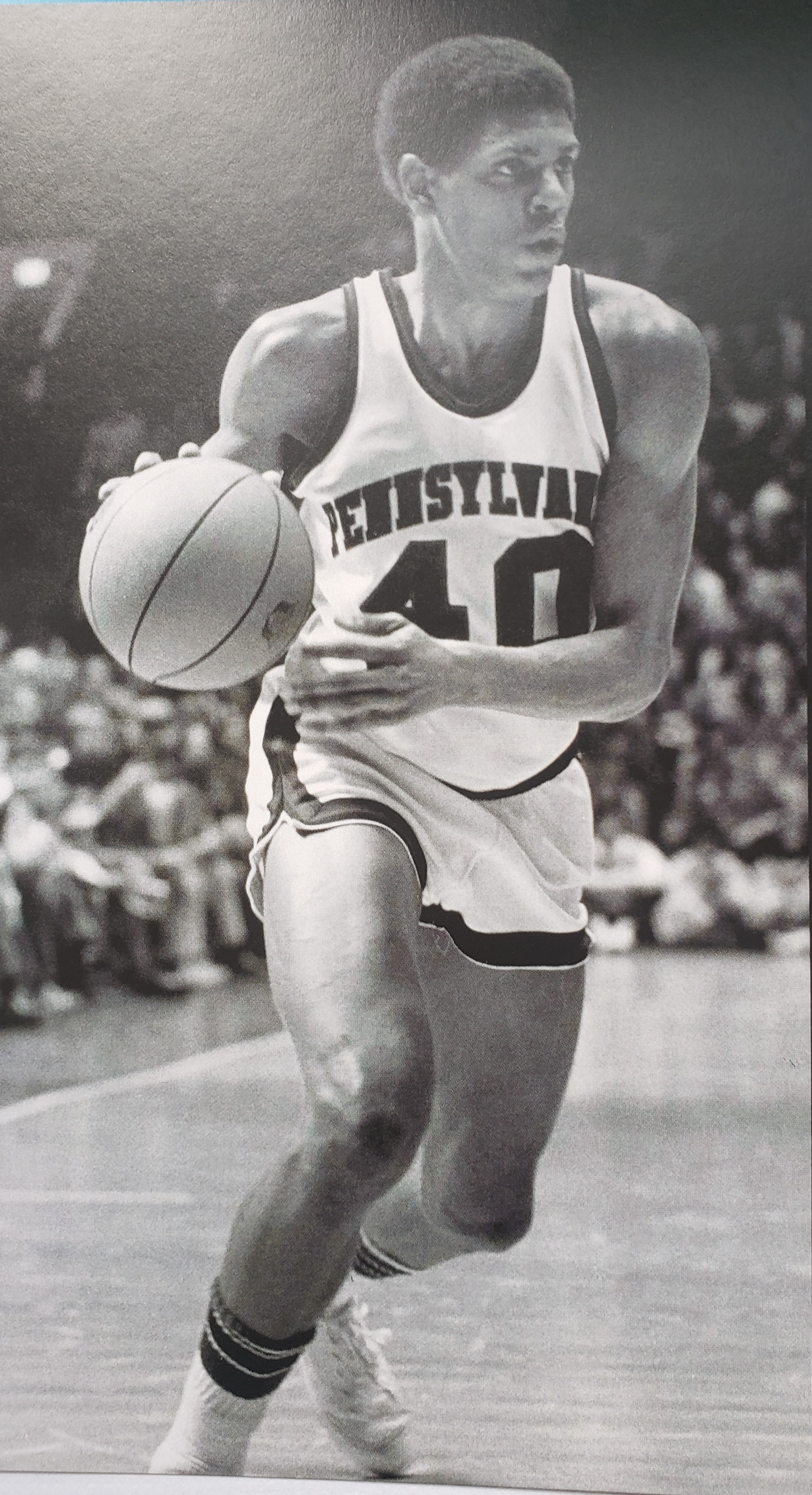
Keven McDonald, Penn, 1977

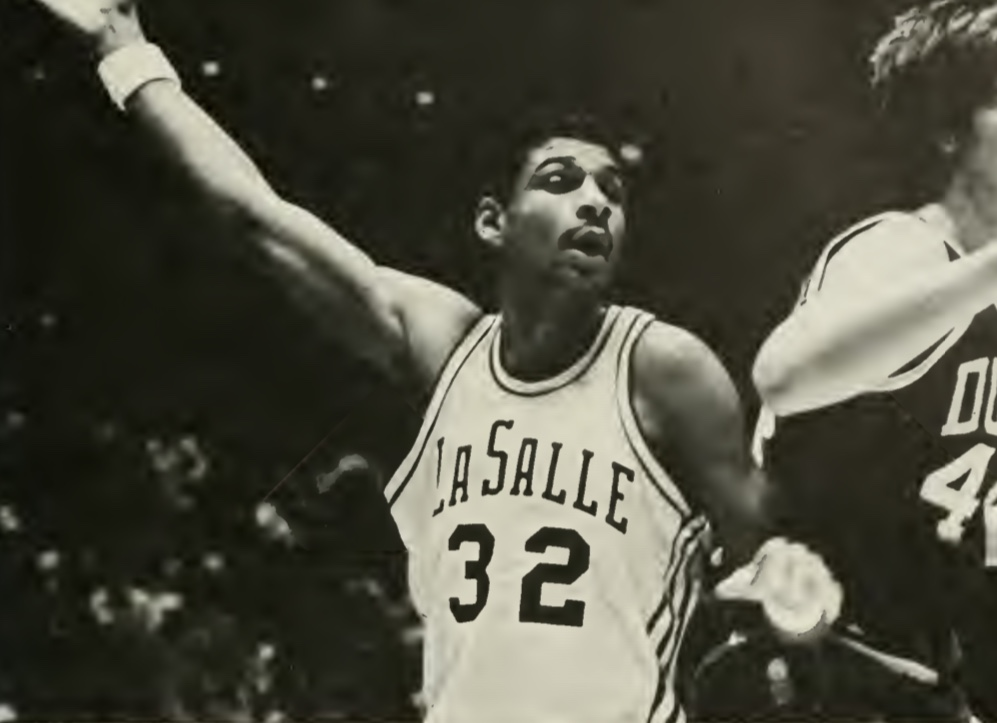
Michael Brooks, La Salle, 1978 and 1980

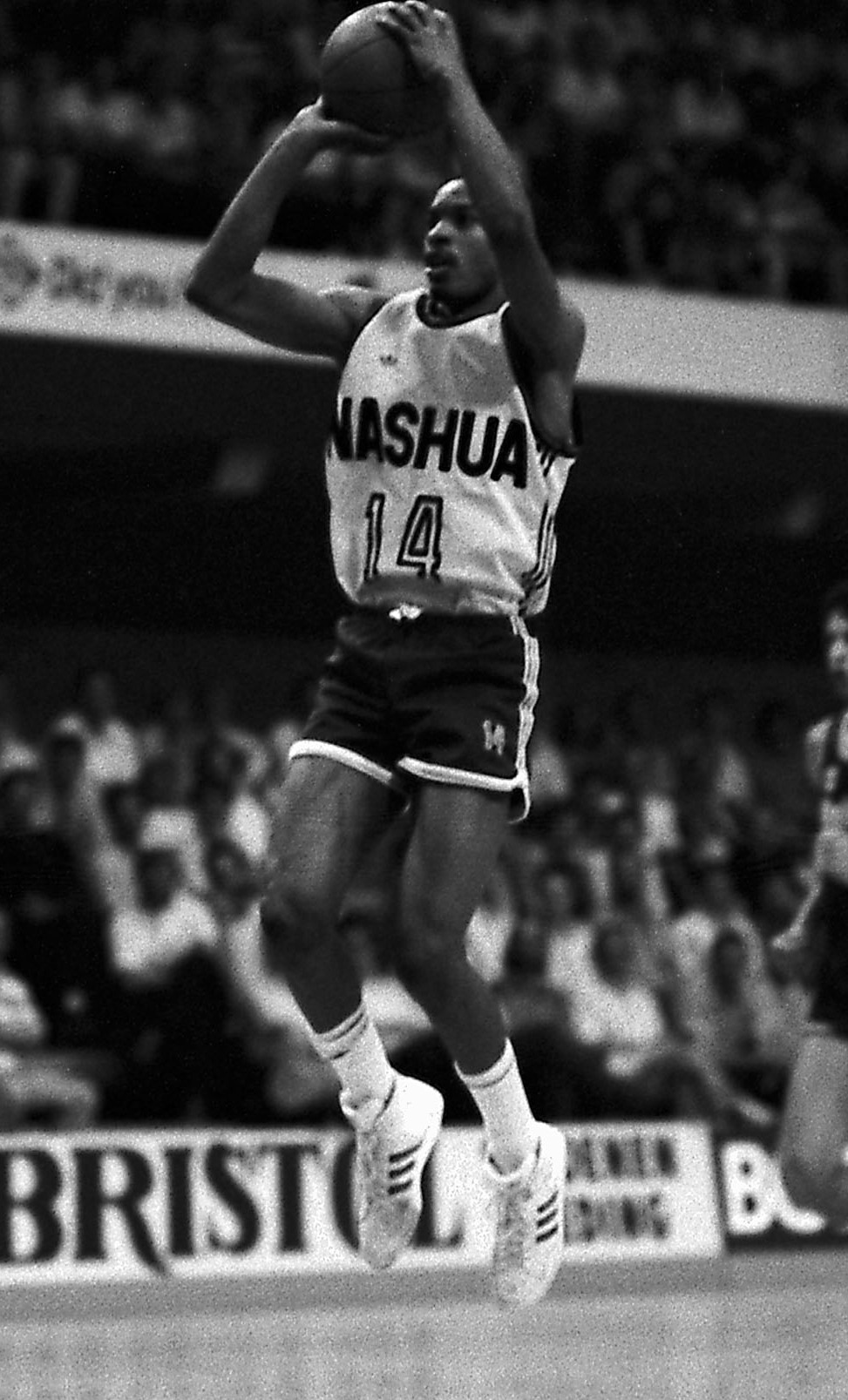
Terence Stansbury, Temple, 1983

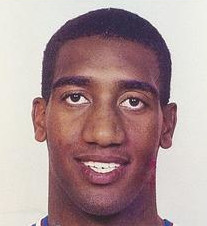
Harold Pressley, Villanova, 1986

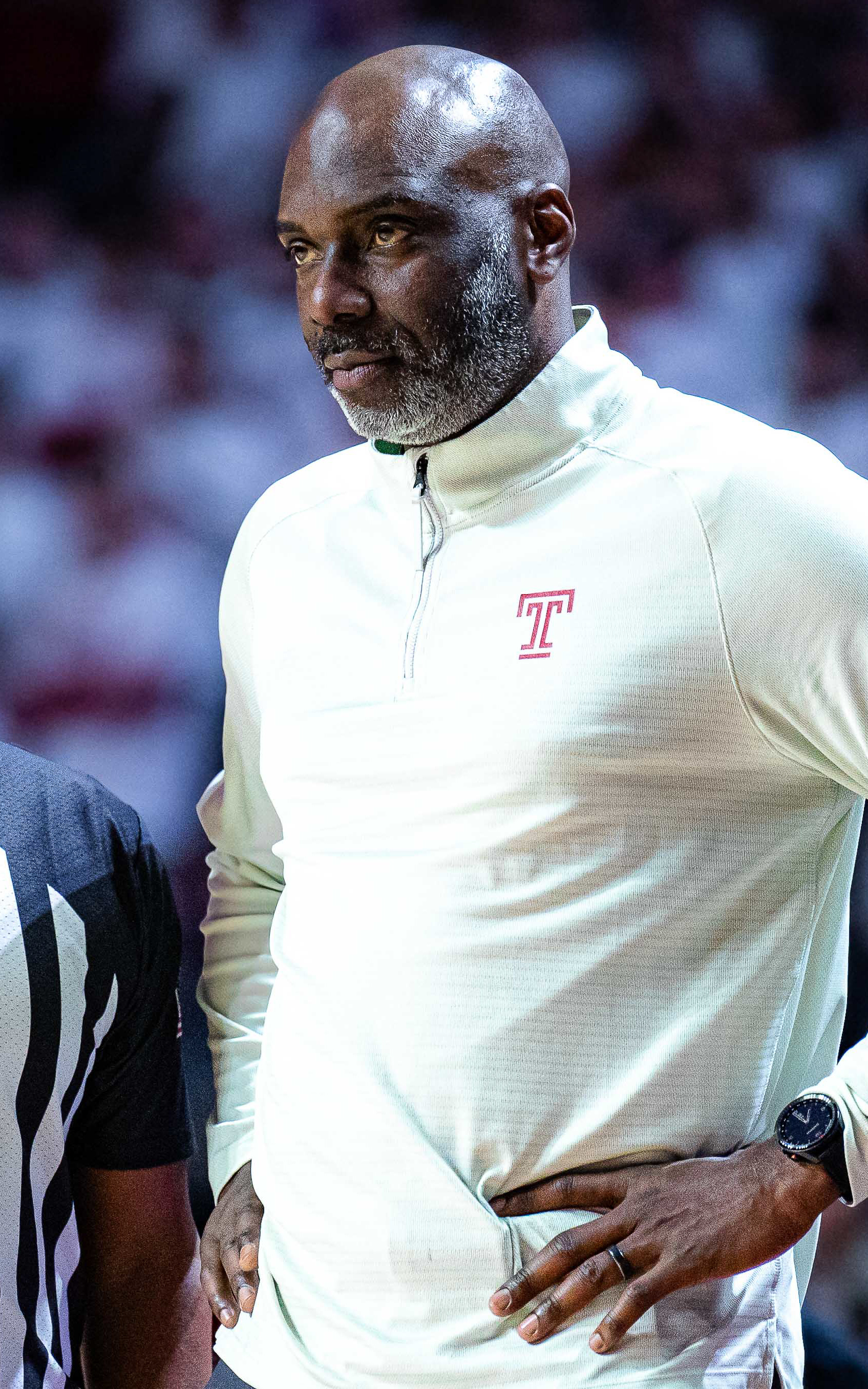
Aaron McKie, Temple, 1993

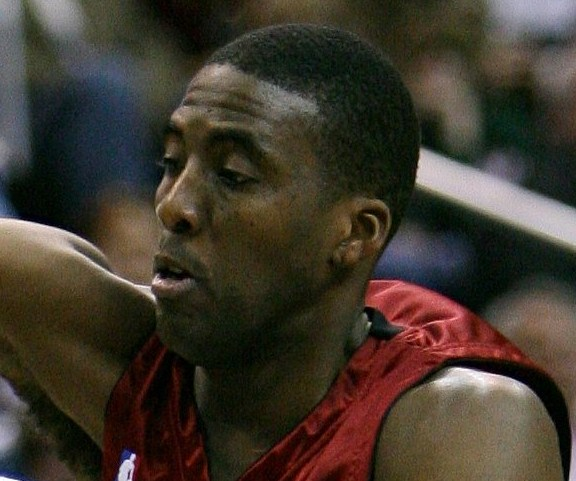
Eddie Jones, Temple, 1994

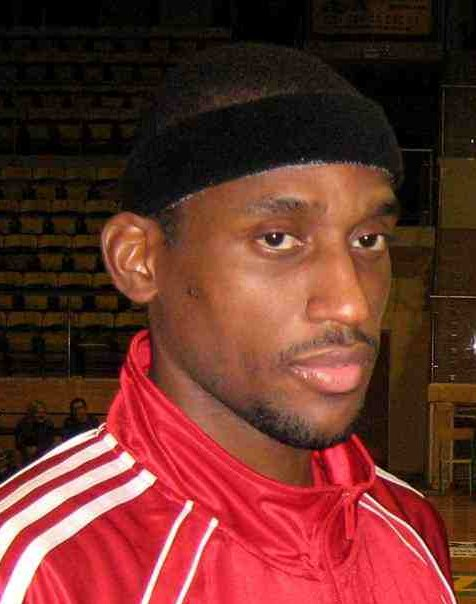
Rashid Bey, Saint Joseph's, 1997 and 1998

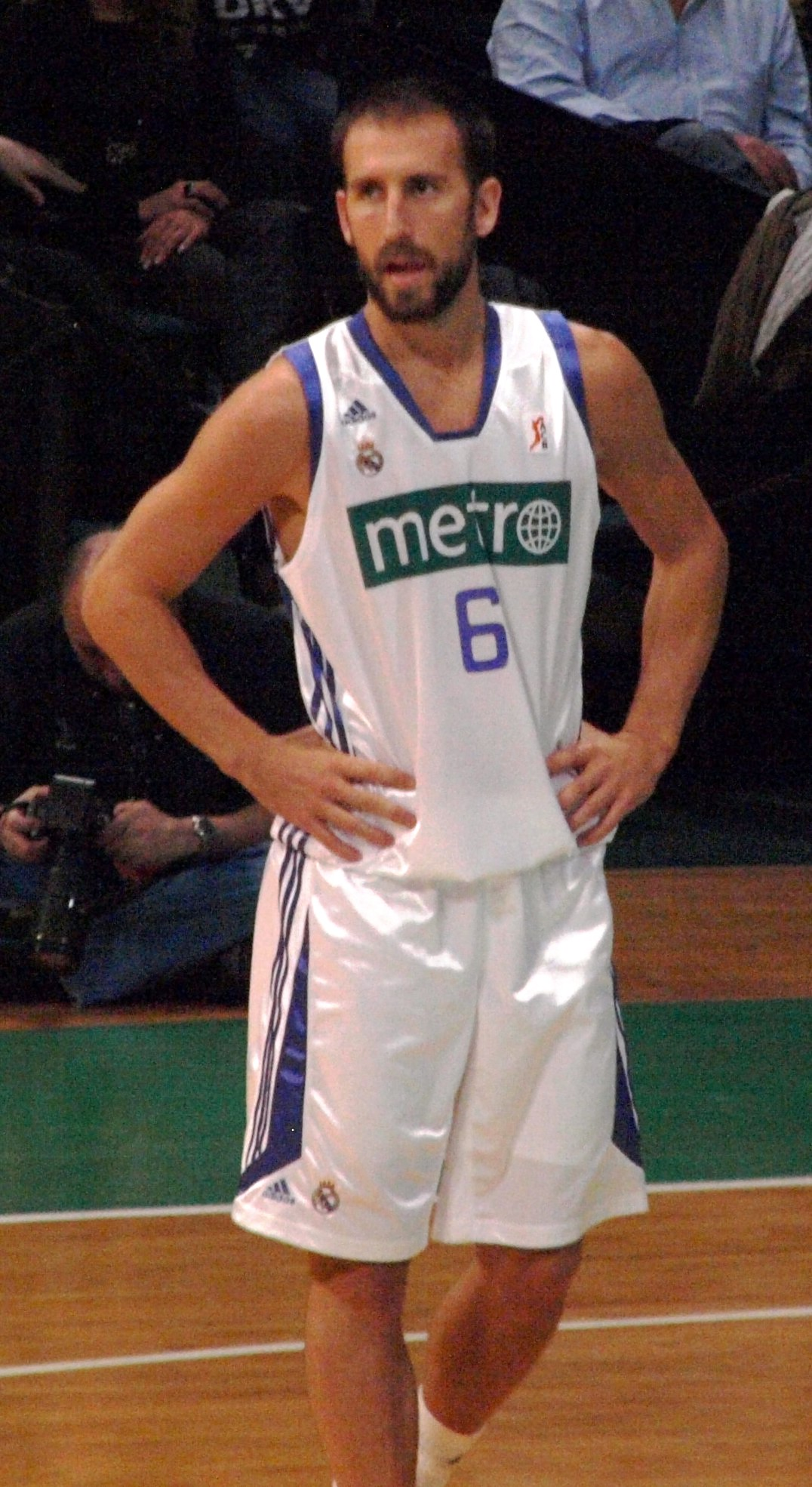
Pepe Sánchez, Temple, 1999 and 2000

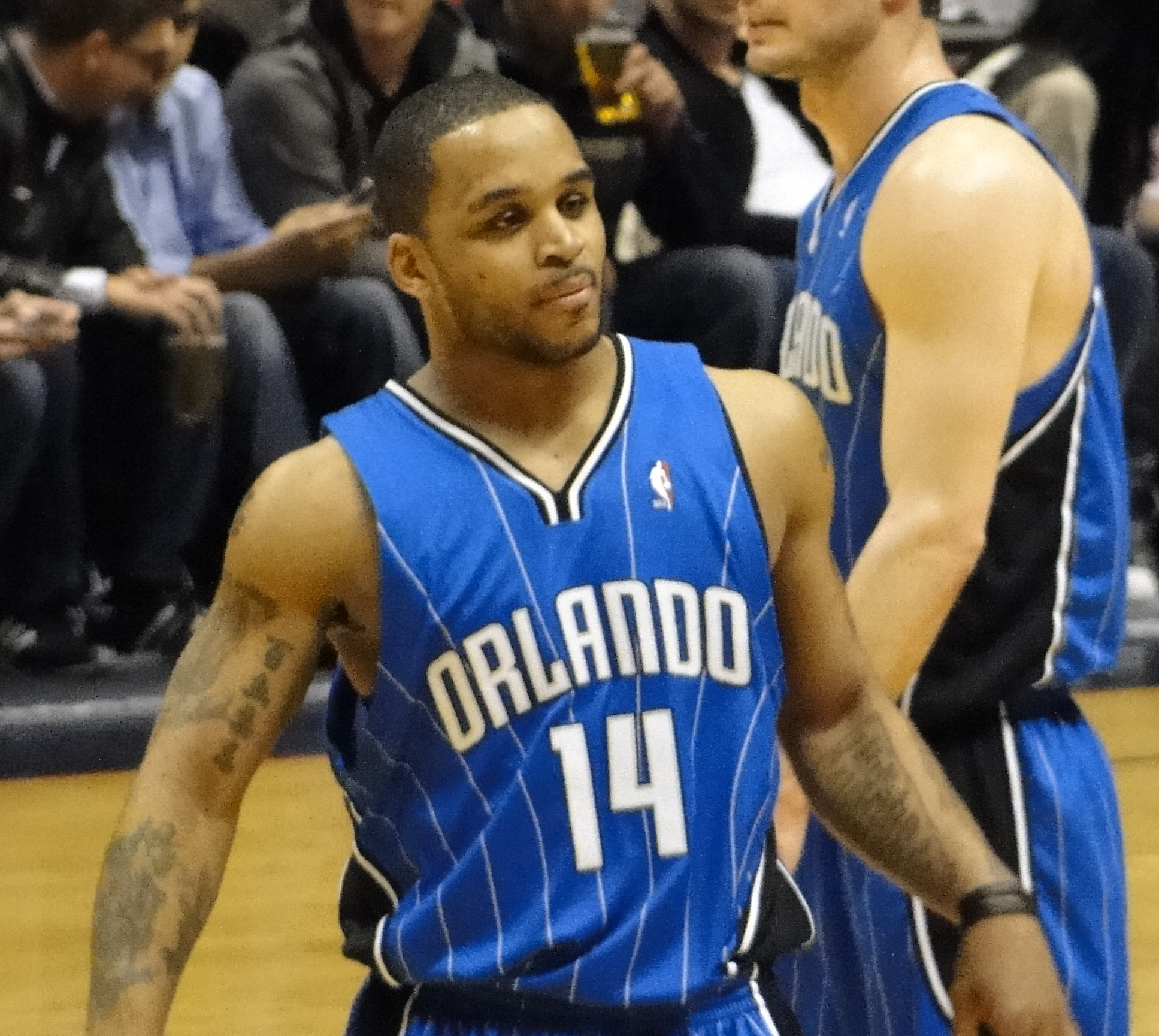
Jameer Nelson, Saint Joseph's, 2004

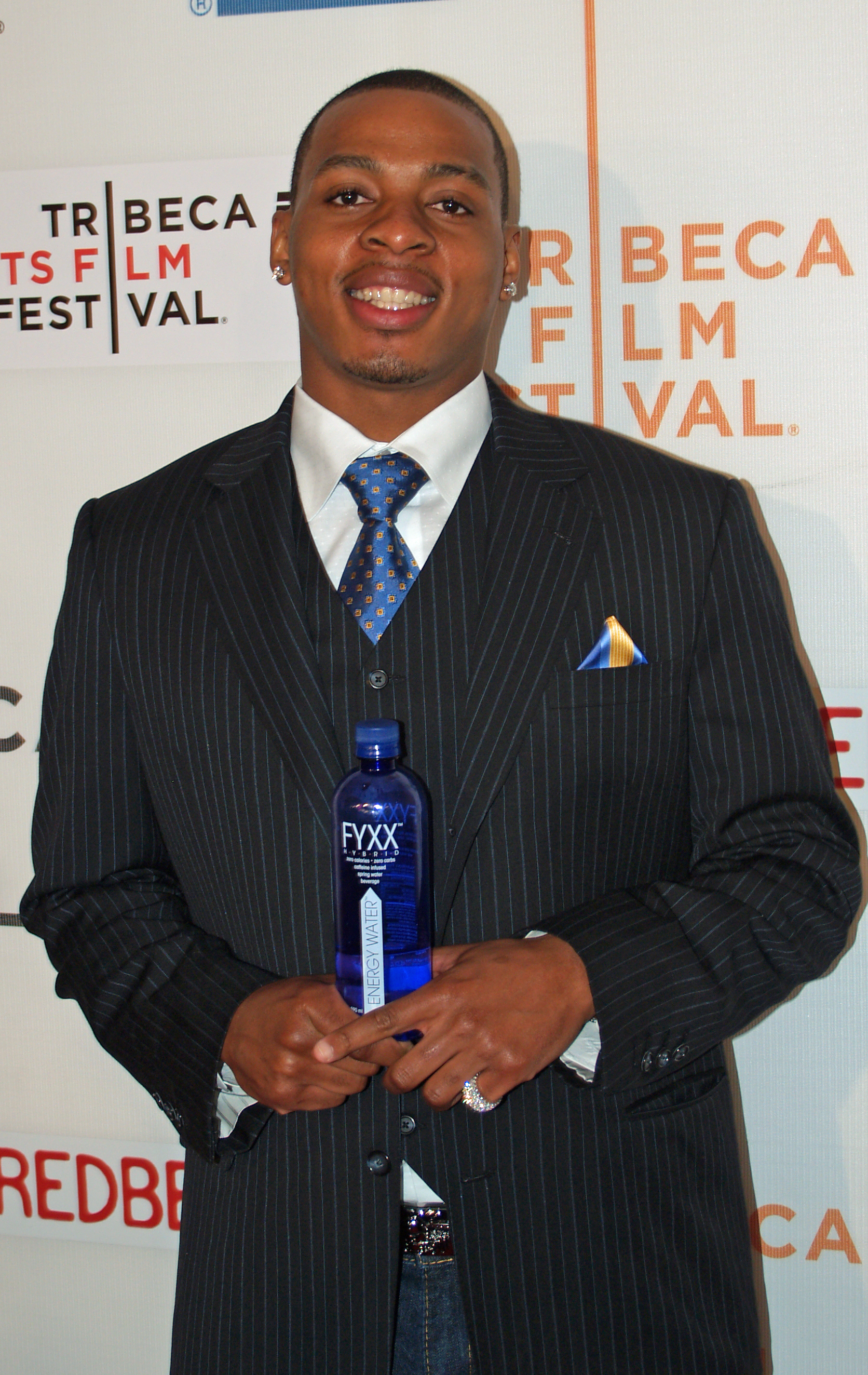
Randy Foye, Villanova, 2006

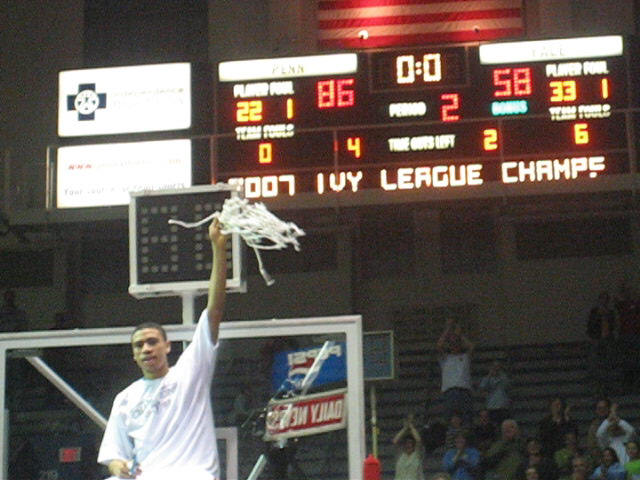
Ibrahim Jaaber, Penn, 2007

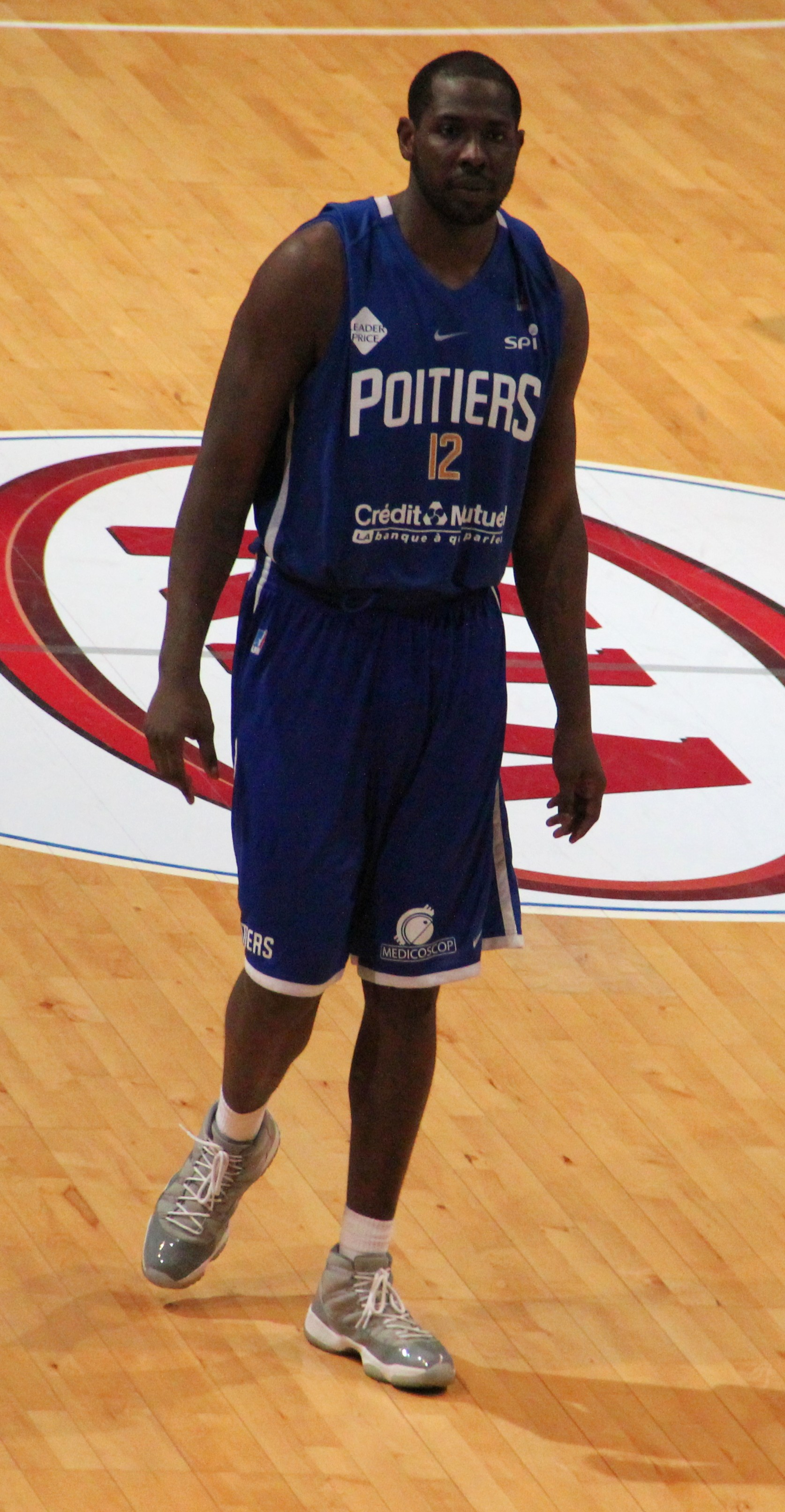
Ahmad Nivins, Saint Joseph's, 2009

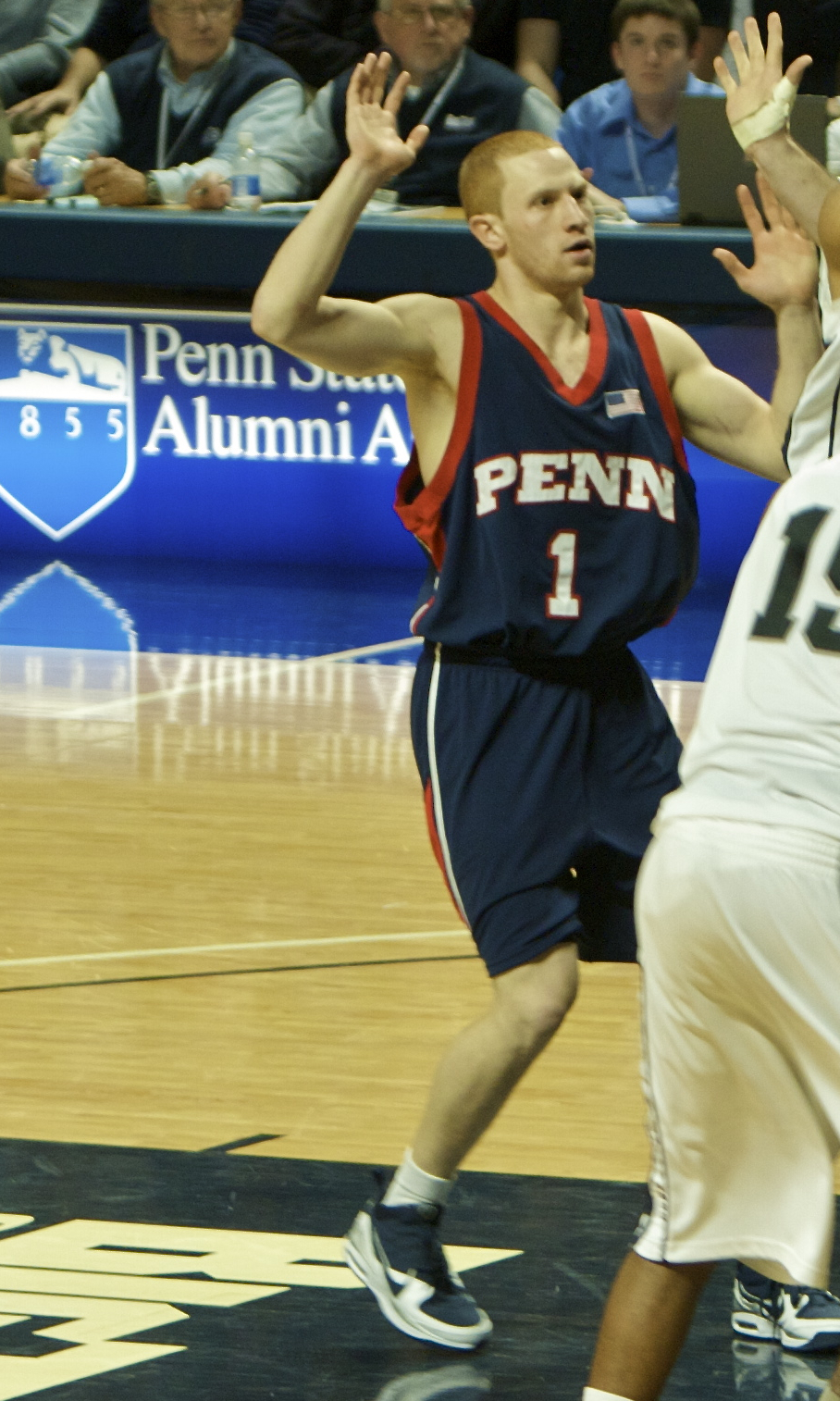
Zack Rosen, Penn, 2012

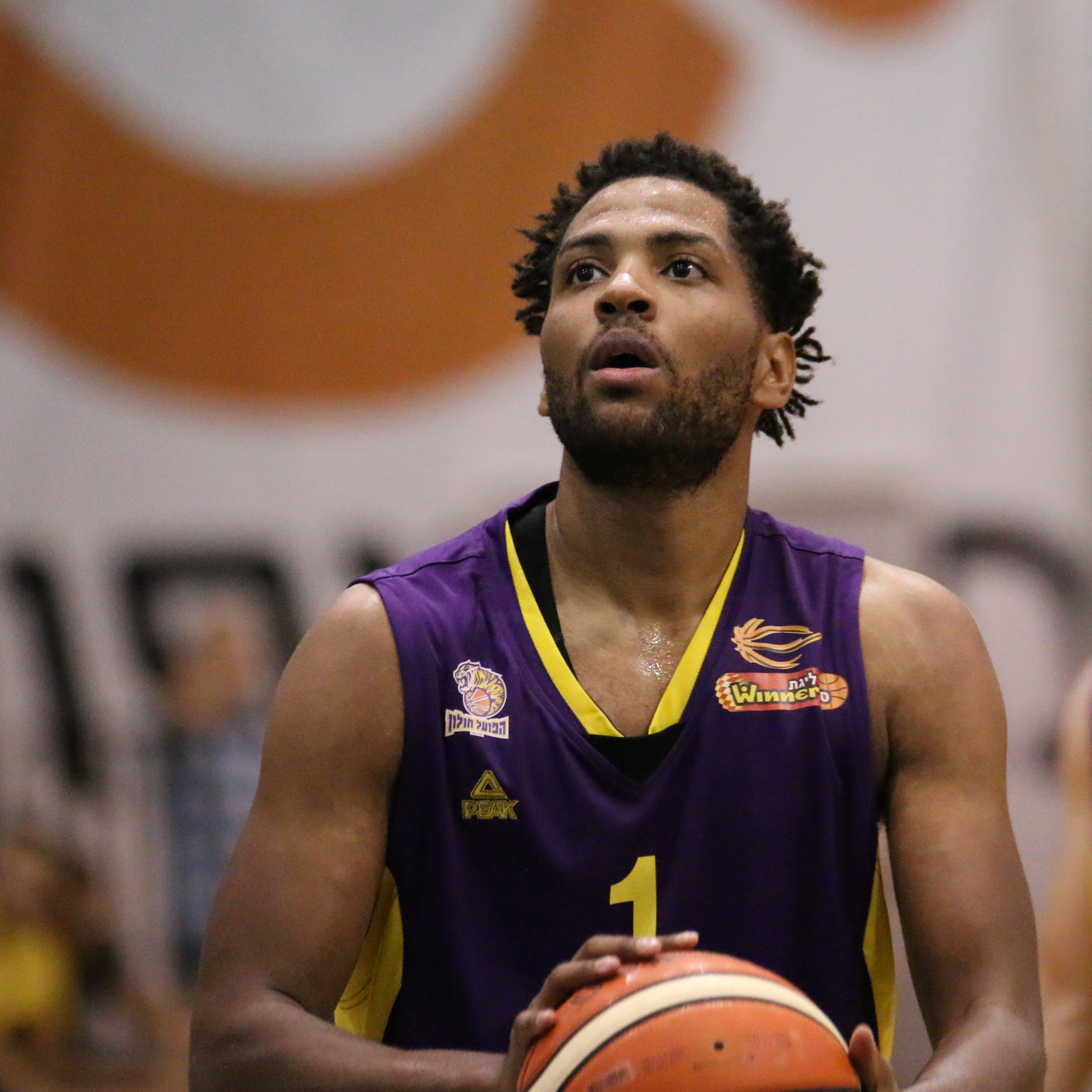
Khalif Wyatt, Temple, 2013

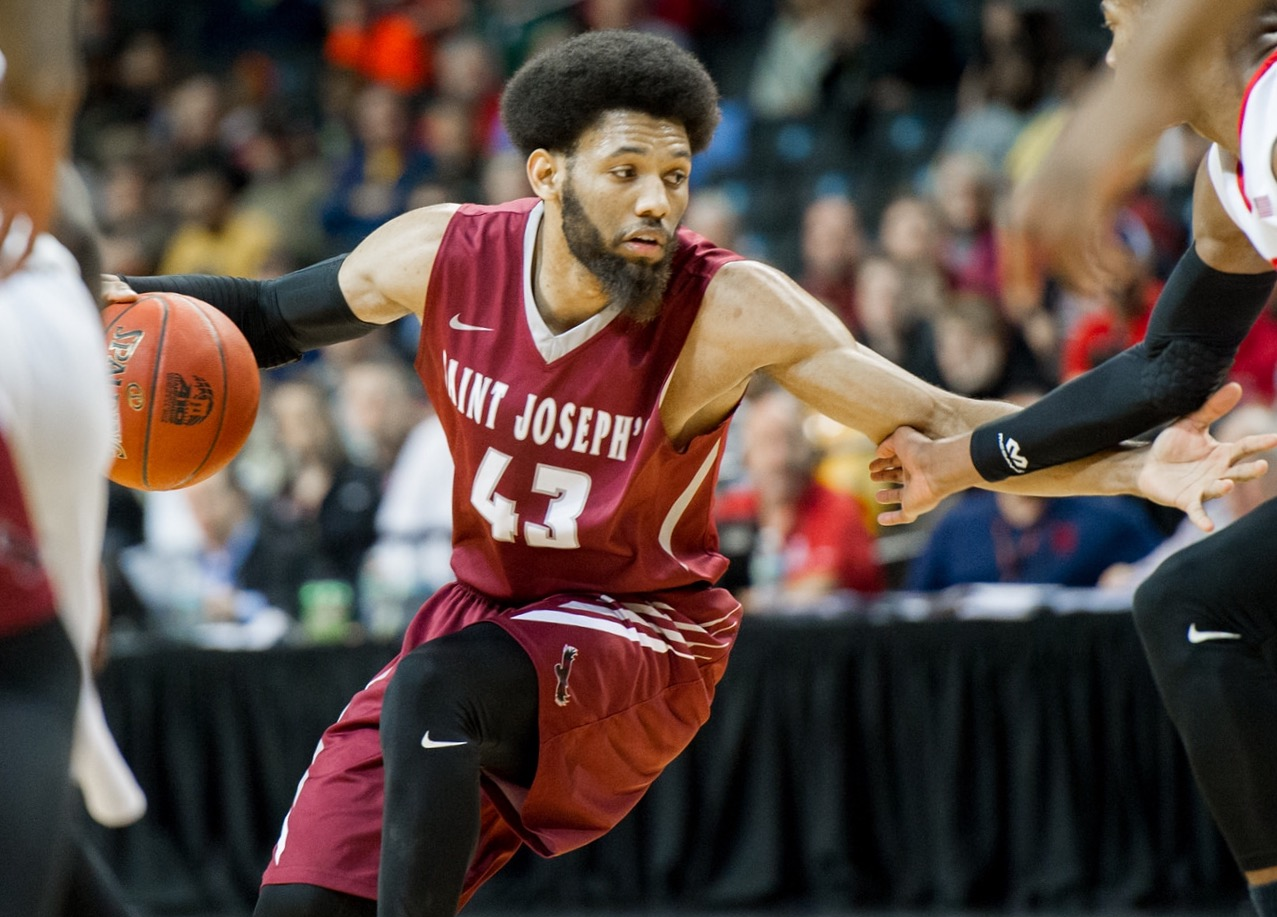
DeAndre' Bembry, Saint Joseph's, 2016

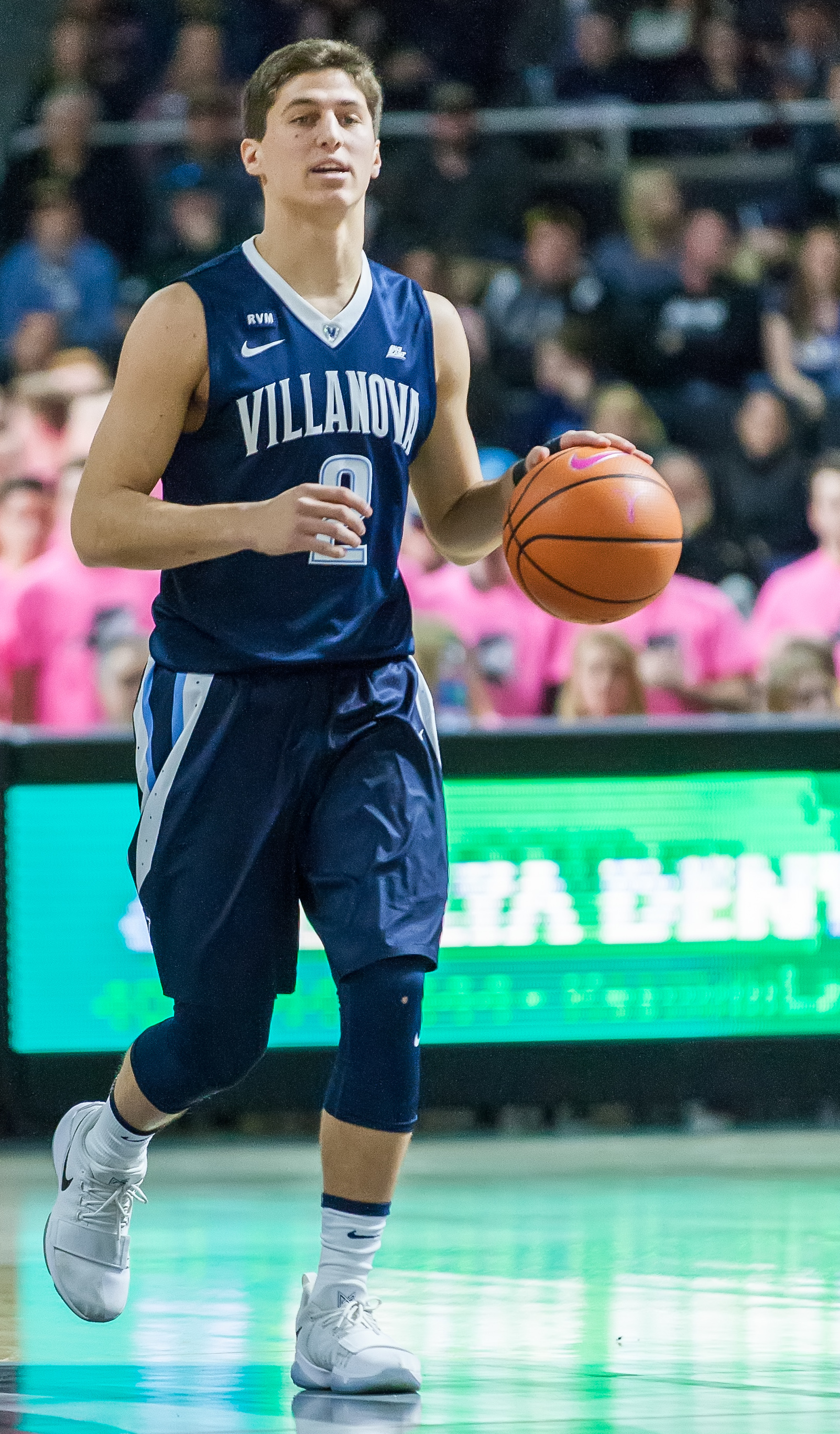
Collin Gillespie, Villanova, 2021 and 2022

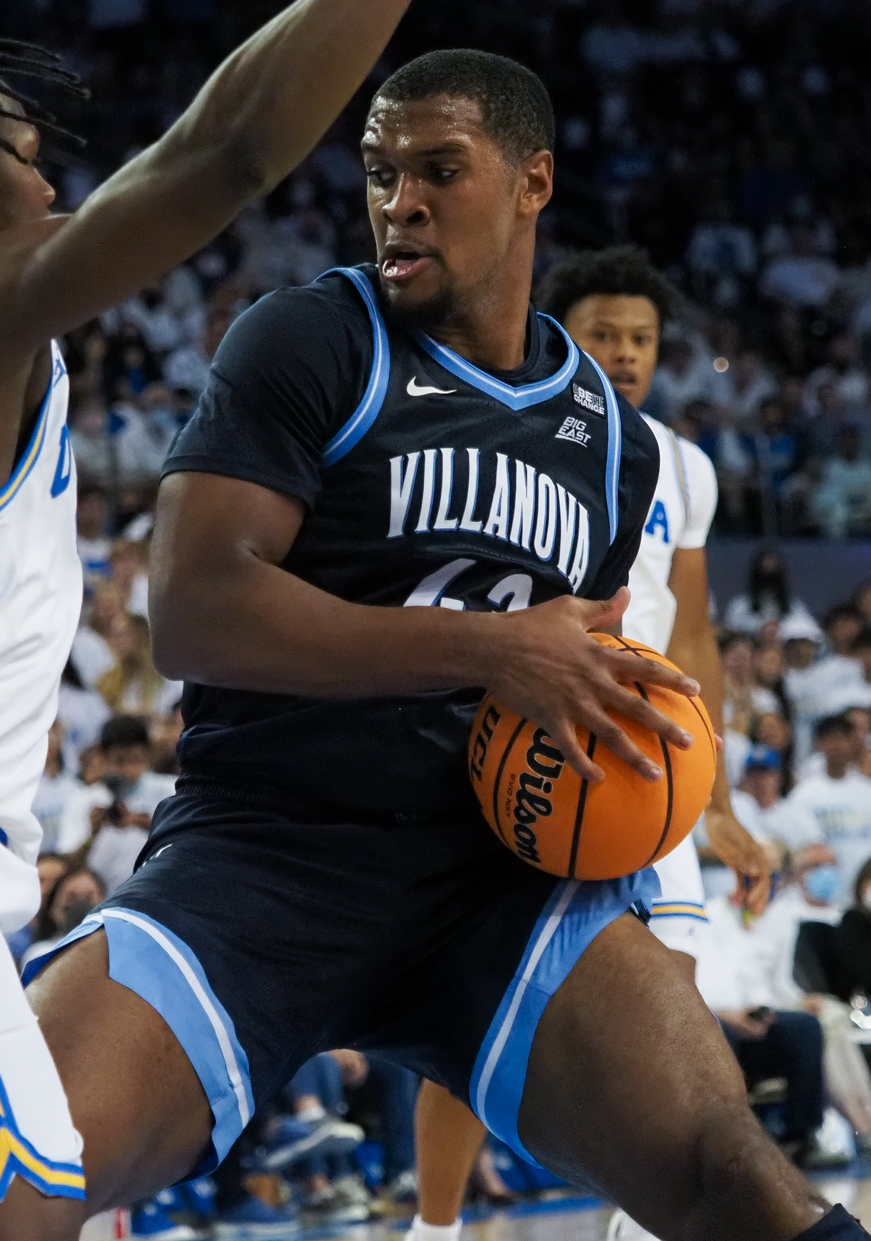
Eric Dixon, Villanova, 2024 and 2025

| Season | Player | School | Position | Class | Reference |
|---|---|---|---|---|---|
| 1955–56 | Guy Rodgers | Temple | PG | Sophomore | |
| 1956–57 | Guy Rodgers (2) | Temple | PG | Junior | |
| 1957–58 | Guy Rodgers (3) | Temple | PG | Senior | |
| 1958–59 | Joe Spratt | Saint Joseph's | PF | Senior | |
| 1959–60 | Bill Kennedy | Temple | PG | Senior | |
| 1960–61 | Bruce Drysdale | Temple | SG / PG | Junior | |
| 1961–62 | Hubie White | Villanova | SG / PG | Senior | |
| 1962–63^{†} | Wali Jones | Villanova | SG | Junior | |
| 1962–63^{†} | Jim Lynam | Saint Joseph's | SG | Senior | |
| 1963–64^{†} | Steve Courtin | Saint Joseph's | SG | Senior | |
| 1963–64^{†} | Wali Jones (2) | Villanova | SG | Senior | |
| 1964–65 | Jim Washington | Villanova | PF | Senior | |
| 1965–66 | Bill Melchionni | Villanova | SG | Senior | |
| 1966–67 | Cliff Anderson | Saint Joseph's | SG / SF | Senior | |
| 1967–68 | Johnny Jones | Villanova | SG | Junior | |
| 1968–69^{†} | Ken Durrett | La Salle | PF / C | Sophomore | |
| 1968–69^{†} | Howard Porter | Villanova | C | Sophomore | |
| 1969–70 | Ken Durrett (2) | La Salle | PF / C | Junior | |
| 1970–71 | Ken Durrett (3) | La Salle | PF / C | Senior | |
| 1971–72^{†} | Corky Calhoun | Penn | SF | Senior | |
| 1971–72^{†} | Chris Ford | Villanova | SG | Senior | |
| 1972–73 | Tom Ingelsby | Villanova | SG / PG | Senior | |
| 1973–74 | Ron Haigler | Penn | PF | Junior | |
| 1974–75 | Ron Haigler (2) | Penn | PF | Senior | |
| 1975–76 | Charlie Wise | La Salle | SG | Senior | |
| 1976–77 | Keven McDonald | Penn | SF | Junior | |
| 1977–78 | Michael Brooks | La Salle | SF / PF | Sophomore | |
| 1978–79^{†} | Tony Price | Penn | SG | Senior | |
| 1978–79^{†} | Rick Reed | Temple | SG / SF | Junior | |
| 1979–80 | Michael Brooks (2) | La Salle | SF / PF | Senior | |
| 1980–81 | John Pinone | Villanova | PF | Sophomore | |
| 1981–82^{†} | Jeffery Clark | Saint Joseph's | SF | Senior | |
| 1981–82^{†} | John Pinone (2) | Villanova | PF | Junior | |
| 1982–83^{†} | John Pinone (3) | Villanova | PF | Senior | |
| 1982–83^{†} | Terence Stansbury | Temple | SG / PG | Junior | |
| 1983–84 | Ralph Lewis | La Salle | SG | Junior | |
| 1984–85 | Ed Pinckney | Villanova | PF | Senior | |
| 1985–86 | Harold Pressley | Villanova | SG / SF | Senior | |
| 1986–87 | Nate Blackwell | Temple | SG | Senior | |
| 1987–88 | Lionel Simmons | La Salle | PF | Sophomore | |
| 1988–89 | Lionel Simmons (2) | La Salle | PF | Junior | |
| 1989–90 | Lionel Simmons* (3) | La Salle | PF | Senior | |
| 1990–91 | Mark Macon | Temple | SG | Senior | |
| 1991–92 | Randy Woods | La Salle | PG / SG | Senior | |
| 1992–93 | Aaron McKie | Temple | SG | Junior | |
| 1993–94 | Eddie Jones | Temple | SG | Senior | |
| 1994–95 | Kerry Kittles | Villanova | SG | Junior | |
| 1995–96 | Kerry Kittles (2) | Villanova | SG | Senior | |
| 1996–97^{†} | Rashid Bey | Saint Joseph's | PG / SG | Junior | |
| 1996–97^{†} | Alvin Williams | Villanova | PG | Senior | |
| 1997–98 | Rashid Bey (2) | Saint Joseph's | PG / SG | Senior | |
| 1998–99 | Pepe Sánchez | Temple | PG | Junior | |
| 1999–00 | Pepe Sánchez (2) | Temple | PG | Senior | |
| 2000–01^{†} | Michael Bradley | Villanova | PF / C | Senior | |
| 2000–01^{†} | Marvin O'Connor | Saint Joseph's | SG | Senior | |
| 2001–02 | Lynn Greer | Temple | PG / SG | Senior | |
| 2002–03 | Jameer Nelson | Saint Joseph's | PG | Junior | |
| 2003–04 | Jameer Nelson* (2) | Saint Joseph's | PG | Senior | |
| 2004–05 | Pat Carroll | Saint Joseph's | SG / SF | Senior | |
| 2005–06 | Randy Foye | Villanova | SG | Senior | |
| 2006–07 | Ibrahim Jaaber | Penn | PG | Senior | |
| 2007–08^{†} | Pat Calathes | Saint Joseph's | SF / SG | Senior | |
| 2007–08^{†} | Mark Tyndale | Temple | PF | Senior | |
| 2008–09 | Ahmad Nivins | Saint Joseph's | SF | Senior | |
| 2009–10 | Scottie Reynolds | Villanova | PG / SG | Senior | |
| 2010–11 | Lavoy Allen | Temple | PF / C | Senior | |
| 2011–12 | Zack Rosen | Penn | PG | Senior | |
| 2012–13 | Khalif Wyatt | Temple | SG | Senior | |
| 2013–14 | James Bell | Villanova | SG | Senior | |
| 2014–15 | Darrun Hilliard | Villanova | SG | Senior | |
| 2015–16 | DeAndre' Bembry | Saint Joseph's | SF | Junior | |
| 2016–17 | Josh Hart | Villanova | SG | Senior | |
| 2017–18 | Jalen Brunson* | Villanova | PG | Junior | |
| 2018–19 | Phil Booth | Villanova | PG | Senior | |
| 2019–20 | Saddiq Bey | Villanova | SF | Sophomore | |
| 2020–21 | Collin Gillespie | Villanova | PG | Senior | |
| 2021–22 | Collin Gillespie (2) | Villanova | PG | Graduate | |
| 2022–23 | Jordan Dingle | Penn | SG | Junior | |
| 2023–24 | Eric Dixon | Villanova | PF | Senior | |
| 2024–25 | Eric Dixon (2) | Villanova | PF | Graduate | |
| 2025–26 | Derek Simpson | Saint Joseph's | PG | Senior | |

== Winners by school ==
| School | Winners | Years |
|---|---|---|
| Villanova | 30 | 1962, 1963^{†}, 1964^{†}, 1965, 1966, 1968, 1969^{†}, 1972^{†}, 1973, 1981, 1982^{†}, 1983^{†}, 1985, 1986, 1995, 1996, 1997^{†}, 2001^{†}, 2006, 2010, 2014, 2015, 2017, 2018, 2019, 2020, 2021, 2022, 2024, 2025 |
| Temple | 17 | 1956, 1957, 1958, 1960, 1961, 1979^{†}, 1983^{†}, 1987, 1991, 1993, 1994, 1999, 2000, 2002, 2008^{†}, 2011, 2013 |
| Saint Joseph's | 15 | 1959, 1963^{†}, 1964^{†}, 1967, 1982^{†}, 1997^{†}, 1998, 2001^{†}, 2003, 2004, 2005, 2008^{†}, 2009, 2016, 2026 |
| La Salle | 11 | 1969^{†}, 1970, 1971, 1976, 1978, 1980, 1984, 1988, 1989, 1990, 1992 |
| Penn | 8 | 1972^{†}, 1974, 1975, 1977, 1979^{†}, 2007, 2012, 2023 |
| Drexel | 0 | — |
