= 1989–90 La Salle Explorers men's basketball team =

American college basketball season

1989–90 La Salle Explorers men's basketball

MAAC South Division champion MAAC regular season champion MAAC tournament champion

NCAA Division I tournament, second round
- Conference: Metro Atlantic Athletic Conference
- South Division

Ranking
- Coaches: No. 13
- AP: No. 12
- Record: 30–2 (16–0 MAAC)
- Head coach: Speedy Morris (4th season)
- Assistant coaches: Joe Mihalich; Randy Monroe; Sam Rines
- Home arena: Convention Hall

1989–90 MAAC men's basketball standings
	Conf.				Overall
Team	W		L	PCT	W		L	PCT
North
Holy Cross	14	–	2	.875	24	–	6	.800
Siena	11	–	5	.688	16	–	13	.552
Fordham	10	–	6	.625	20	–	13	.606
Canisius	5	–	11	.313	11	–	18	.379
Army	5	–	11	.313	10	–	19	.345
Niagara	5	–	11	.313	6	–	22	.214
South
No. 12 La Salle †	16	–	0	1.000	30	–	2	.938
Iona	8	–	8	.500	13	–	15	.464
Saint Peter's	7	–	9	.438	14	–	14	.500
Manhattan	7	–	9	.438	11	–	17	.393
Fairfield	6	–	10	.375	10	–	19	.345
Loyola (MD)	2	–	14	.125	4	–	24	.143
† 1990 MAAC tournament winner Rankings from AP poll

The 1989–90 La Salle Explorers men's basketball team represented La Salle University during the 1989–90 NCAA Division I men's basketball season. Led by fourth-year head coach Speedy Morris, the team established the single-season school record for wins with a 30–2 record (16-0 MAAC), including a 22-game win streak. National Player of the Year Lionel "L-Train" Simmons finished his collegiate career third in NCAA scoring with 3,217 points, and also accumulated 1,429 rebounds. He was the first player in NCAA history to score more than 3,000 points and grab more than 1,100 rebounds.

== Roster ==
1989–90 La Salle Explorers men's basketball team
Players
Coaches

Pos.	#	Name	Height	Weight	Year	Previous school	Hometown
G	10	Keith Morris	5 ft 10 in (1.78 m)	—	So	Penn Charter	Philadelphia, PA
G	11	Doug Overton	6 ft 3 in (1.91 m)	190 lb (86 kg)	Jr	Dobbins Technical	Philadelphia, PA
G	14	Randy Woods	5 ft 10 in (1.78 m)	180 lb (82 kg)	So	Benjamin Franklin	Philadelphia, PA
G	20	Bobby Johnson	6 ft 5 in (1.96 m)	—	Sr	South Philadelphia	Philadelphia, PA
F	22	Lionel Simmons (C)	6 ft 7 in (2.01 m)	210 lb (95 kg)	Sr	South Philadelphia	Philadelphia, PA
G	24	Jeff Neubauer	6 ft 4 in (1.93 m)	—	Fr	Slidell	Slidell, LA
G	25	Jack Hurd	6 ft 6 in (1.98 m)	—	So	Warwick	Lititz, PA
G	35	Mike Bergin	6 ft 4 in (1.93 m)	—	Fr	St. John's	College Park, MD
F	42	Mike Stock	6 ft 5 in (1.96 m)	—	Jr	Bishop Egan	Bensalem, PA
C	44	Milko Lieverst	6 ft 9 in (2.06 m)	—	So	Sweelinck	Amsterdam, Netherlands
F	51	Bron Holland	6 ft 8 in (2.03 m)	—	So	Bangor	Bangor, PA
C	52	Don Shelton	6 ft 8 in (2.03 m)	—	So	Trenton Central	Trenton, NJ

Head coach

- Speedy Morris

Assistant coach(es)

- Joe Mihalich (La Salle)
- Randy Monroe (Cheyney)
- Sam Rines (Cheyney)
- Rich Prendergast (La Salle)

Legend

- (C) Team captain
- (S) Suspended
- (I) Ineligible
- (W) Walk-on
- Injured
- Current redshirt

Roster

== Schedule and results ==
Date time, TV	Rank^{#}	Opponent^{#}	Result	Record	High points	High rebounds	High assists	Site (attendance) city, state
Regular season
Nov 24, 1989*; 9:00 pm		vs. SW Missouri State; Coors Light Classic	W 62–58	1–0	24 – Simmons	8 – Lieverst	–	Selland Arena (9,902); Fresno, CA
Nov 25, 1989*; 11:00 pm		at Fresno State; Coors Light Classic	W 75–63	2–0	24 – Simmons	7 – Lieverst	–	Selland Arena (9,902); Fresno, CA
Dec 2, 1989*; 4:00 pm, ABC		at DePaul	W 83–62	3–0	26 – Simmons	14 – Simmons	–	Rosemont Horizon (8,669); Rosemont, IL
Dec 11, 1989*; 8:00 pm		Penn	W 86–83	4–0	22 – Overton	12 – Simmons	–	Convention Hall (5,163); Philadelphia, PA
Dec 21, 1989*; 7:00 pm	No. 23	Villanova	W 71–70	5–0	19 – Overton	9 – Simmons	–	Convention Hall (10,004); Philadelphia, PA
Dec 27, 1989*; 7:30 pm, ESPN	No. 20	vs. Ohio State; Sugar Bowl Classic	W 74–62	6–0	26 – Simmons	13 – Simmons	–	Louisiana Superdome (8,000); New Orleans, LA
Dec 28, 1989*; 9:30 pm	No. 20	vs. Florida; Sugar Bowl Classic	W 76–69	7–0	33 – Simmons	10 – Simmons	7 – Simmons	Louisiana Superdome (5,847); New Orleans, LA
Jan 3, 1990*; 7:00 pm	No. 17	at Temple	W 63–62	8–0	23 – Simmons	14 – Simmons	–	McGonigle Hall (3,900); Philadelphia, PA
Jan 6, 1990*	No. 17	No. 25 Loyola Marymount	L 116–121	8–1	34 – Simmons	19 – Simmons	10 – Overton	Convention Hall (10,254); Philadelphia, PA
Jan 9, 1990	No. 21	Siena	W 106–90	9–1 (1–0)	29 – Simmons	11 – Simmons	13 – Overton	Convention Hall (4,311); Philadelphia, PA
Jan 12, 1990*	No. 21	Notre Dame	W 86–78	10–1	27 – Simmons, Overton	5 – Simmons, Lieverst	–	Convention Hall (10,004); Philadelphia, PA
Jan 18, 1990	No. 17	Canisius	W 89–77	11–1 (2–0)	27 – Simmons	11 – Simmons	–	Convention Hall (3,387); Philadelphia, PA
Jan 20, 1990	No. 18	at Holy Cross	W 84–81	12–1 (3–0)	28 – Simmons	11 – Simmons	–	Hart Center (4,000); Worcester, MA
Jan 22, 1990	No. 17	Loyola (MD)	W 89–69	13–1 (4–0)	36 – Simmons	14 – Simmons	–	Convention Hall (3,776); Philadelphia, PA
Jan 25, 1990	No. 18	at Niagara	W 87–69	14–1 (5–0)	25 – Simmons	7 – Simmons, Woods	–	Niagara Falls Convention Center (2,296); Niagara Falls, NY
Jan 27, 1990	No. 18	at Fordham	W 98–72	15–1 (6–0)	30 – Simmons	14 – Simmons	–	Rose Hill Gymnasium (4,384); Bronx, NY
Feb 3, 1990	No. 15	at Iona	W 89–73	16–1 (7–0)	26 – Simmons	7 – Simmons, Overton	–	Hynes Athletic Center (2,796); New Rochelle, NY
Feb 5, 1990	No. 15	Saint Peter's	W 72–59	17–1 (8–0)	26 – Simmons	10 – Simmons	–	Convention Hall (4,247); Philadelphia, PA
Feb 8, 1990	No. 14	at Fairfield	W 78–51	18–1 (9–0)	22 – Simmons, Overton	13 – Simmons	–	Alumni Hall (3,022); Fairfield, CT
Feb 10, 1990	No. 14	at Manhattan	W 99–78	19–1 (10–0)	40 – Simmons	14 – Simmons	–	Draddy Gymnasium (2,414); Bronx, NY
Feb 12, 1990*	No. 14	at Saint Joseph's	W 93–76	20–1	26 – Overton	8 – Simmons	–	Hagan Arena (3,200); Philadelphia, PA
Feb 16, 1990	No. 14	Iona	W 95–78	21–1 (11–0)	20 – Overton	11 – Simmons	–	Convention Hall (5,143); Philadelphia, PA
Feb 18, 1990	No. 14	Fairfield	W 72–49	22–1 (12–0)	24 – Simmons	10 – Simmons	–	Convention Hall (5,238); Philadelphia, PA
Feb 25, 1990	No. 14	at Loyola (MD)	W 110–81	23–1 (13–0)	34 – Simmons	7 – Simmons	–	Reitz Arena (3,203); Baltimore, MD
Feb 22, 1990	No. 14	Manhattan	W 100–60	24–1 (14–0)	30 – Overton	8 – Johnson	–	Convention Hall (8,136); Philadelphia, PA
Feb 25, 1990	No. 14	at Saint Peter's	W 74–66 ^{OT}	25–1 (15–0)	18 – Simmons	14 – Simmons	–	Yanitelli Center (2,904); Jersey City, NJ
Feb 27, 1990	No. 13	Army	W 106–73	26–1 (16–0)	29 – Simmons	20 – Simmons	–	Convention Hall (5,217); Philadelphia, PA
MAAC Tournament
Mar 3, 1990	No. 13	vs. Fairfield; Quarterfinal	W 90–60	27–1	34 – Simmons	11 – Simmons	–	Times Union Center (12,231); Albany, NY
Mar 4, 1990	No. 13	vs. Siena; Semifinal	W 106–90	28–1	26 – Simmons	11 – Simmons	–	Times Union Center (11,691); Albany, NY
Mar 5, 1990; ESPN	No. 13	vs. Fordham; Championship	W 71–61	29–1	26 – Simmons	16 – Simmons	–	Times Union Center (5,712); Albany, NY
NCAA Tournament
Mar 15, 1990*; CBS	(E4) No. 12	vs. (E13) Southern Miss; First Round	W 79–63	30–1	32 – Simmons	16 – Simmons	6 – Overton	Hartford Civic Center (15,937); Hartford, CT
Mar 17, 1990*; CBS	(E4) No. 12	vs. (E5) No. 17 Clemson; Second Round	L 75–79	30–2	28 – Simmons	7 – Johnson	6 – Overton	Hartford Civic Center (16,011); Hartford, CT
*Non-conference game. ^{#}Rankings from AP Poll. (#) Tournament seedings in parentheses.

== Rankings ==
Ranking movements Legend: ██ Increase in ranking ██ Decrease in ranking — = Not ranked
	Week																
Poll	Pre	1	2	3	4	5	6	7	8	9	10	11	12	13	14	15	Final
AP	—	—	—	—	23	20	17	21	17	18	15	14	14	14	13	11	12
Coaches	—	—	—	—	—	16	19	—	19	18	15	16	14	14	14	12	13

*Final AP and Coaches rankings released prior to NCAA tournament

== Awards and honors ==
- Lionel Simmons, Adolph Rupp Trophy
- Lionel Simmons, Associated Press College Basketball Player of the Year
- Lionel Simmons, First Team All-Big 5 selection
- Lionel Simmons, Robert V. Geasey Trophy
- Lionel Simmons, Metro Atlantic Athletic Conference Player of the Year
- Lionel Simmons, Naismith College Player of the Year
- Lionel Simmons, USBWA College Player of the Year
- Lionel Simmons, State Farm Division I Player of the Year Award
- Lionel Simmons, John R. Wooden Award

== Team players drafted into the NBA ==
Year	Round	Pick	Player	NBA club
1990	1	7	Lionel Simmons	Sacramento Kings
1991	2	40	Doug Overton	Detroit Pistons
1992	1	16	Randy Woods	Los Angeles Clippers
