= 1992 MAAC men's basketball tournament =

- Classification: Division I
- Season: 1991–92
- Teams: 9
- Site: Knickerbocker Arena; Albany, NY
- Champions: La Salle (4th title)
- Winning coach: Speedy Morris (4th title)
- MVP: Randy Woods (La Salle)

1991–92 MAAC men's basketball standings
	Conf.				Overall
Team	W		L	PCT	W		L	PCT
Manhattan	13	–	3	.813	25	–	9	.735
La Salle †	12	–	4	.750	20	–	11	.645
Siena	11	–	5	.688	19	–	10	.655
Loyola (MD)	10	–	6	.625	14	–	14	.500
Iona	8	–	8	.500	14	–	15	.483
Niagara	8	–	8	.500	14	–	14	.500
Fairfield	4	–	12	.250	8	–	20	.286
Saint Peter's	3	–	13	.188	8	–	21	.276
Canisius	3	–	13	.188	8	–	22	.267
† 1992 MAAC tournament winner Rankings from AP Poll

The 1992 MAAC men's basketball tournament was held March 6–9, 1992 at Knickerbocker Arena in Albany, New York.

Number two seed La Salle defeated top-seeded Manhattan in the championship game, 79–78, to win their fourth MAAC men's basketball tournament.

The Explorers received an automatic bid to the 1992 NCAA tournament as the No. 13 seed in the East region.

== Format ==
All nine of the conference's members participated in the tournament field. Teams were seeded based on regular season conference records. All games were played at Knickerbocker Arena in Albany, New York.

== Bracket ==
First round Friday, March 6
8	Canisius	54
9	Saint Peter's	71

Quarterfinals; Saturday, March 7
1	Manhattan	68
9	Saint Peter's	56
4	Loyola (MD)	53
5	Iona	59
3	Siena	83
6	Niagara	57
7	Fairfield	66
2	La Salle	88

Semifinals; Sunday, March 8
1	Manhattan	79
5	Iona	78
3	Siena	71
2	La Salle	84

Championship; Monday, March 9
1	Manhattan	78
2	La Salle	79
