= 1990 MAAC men's basketball tournament =

- Classification: Division I
- Season: 1989–90
- Teams: 10
- First round site: Campus Sites; Campus Arenas
- Finals site: Knickerbocker Arena; Albany, NY
- Champions: La Salle (3rd title)
- Winning coach: Speedy Morris (3rd title)
- MVP: Lionel Simmons (2nd MVP) (La Salle)

1989–90 MAAC men's basketball standings
	Conf.				Overall
Team	W		L	PCT	W		L	PCT
North
Holy Cross	14	–	2	.875	24	–	6	.800
Siena	11	–	5	.688	16	–	13	.552
Fordham	10	–	6	.625	20	–	13	.606
Canisius	5	–	11	.313	11	–	18	.379
Army	5	–	11	.313	10	–	19	.345
Niagara	5	–	11	.313	6	–	22	.214
South
No. 12 La Salle †	16	–	0	1.000	30	–	2	.938
Iona	8	–	8	.500	13	–	15	.464
Saint Peter's	7	–	9	.438	14	–	14	.500
Manhattan	7	–	9	.438	11	–	17	.393
Fairfield	6	–	10	.375	10	–	19	.345
Loyola (MD)	2	–	14	.125	4	–	24	.143
† 1990 MAAC tournament winner Rankings from AP poll

The 1990 MAAC men's basketball tournament was held March 2–5 at Knickerbocker Arena in Albany, New York.

Top-seeded La Salle defeated Fordham in the championship game, 71–61, to win their third MAAC men's basketball tournament.

The Explorers received an automatic bid to the 1990 NCAA tournament as the #4 seed in the East region.

== Format ==
Ten of the conference's twelve members participated in the tournament field. Teams were seeded based on regular season conference records. The top two seeds received byes into the quarterfinals. All games were played at the new Knickerbocker Arena in Albany, New York.

== Bracket ==
First round Friday, March 2
N4	Niagara	63
S5	Fairfield	66
N6	Canisius	61
S3	Manhattan	59
S4	Saint Peter's	56
N5	Army	58
S6	Loyola (MD)	69
N3	Fordham	81

Quarterfinals; Saturday, March 3
S1	La Salle	90
S5	Fairfield	60
N6	Canisius	53
N2	Siena	71
N1	Holy Cross	87
N5	Army	62
N3	Fordham	69
S2	Iona	66

Semifinals; Sunday, March 4
S1	La Salle	106
N2	Siena	90
N1	Holy Cross	71
N3	Fordham	82

Championship; Monday, March 5
S1	La Salle	71
N3	Fordham	61
