= Adolph Rupp Trophy =

US award for college basketball players

Adolph F. Rupp Trophy
- Awarded for: the nation's top NCAA Division I men's basketball player
- Country: United States
- Presented by: Commonwealth Athletic Club of Kentucky

History
- First award: 1972
- Final award: 2015

The Adolph F. Rupp Trophy was an annual college basketball award given to the top player in men's NCAA Division I competition. It was awarded between 1972 and 2015. The recipient of the award was selected by an independent panel consisting of national sportswriters and broadcasters. The trophy was presented each year at the site of the Final Four of the NCAA Division I men's basketball tournament. The Adolph F. Rupp Trophy was administered by the Commonwealth Athletic Club of Kentucky, a non-profit organization with a primary mission of honoring the legacy of University of Kentucky coach Adolph Rupp.

== Key ==
Player (X)	Denotes the number of times the player has been awarded the Adolph Rupp Trophy award at that point

== Winners ==
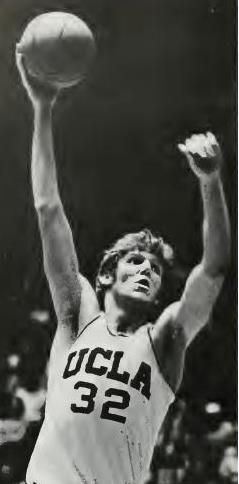
Bill Walton, UCLA, 1972 through 1974

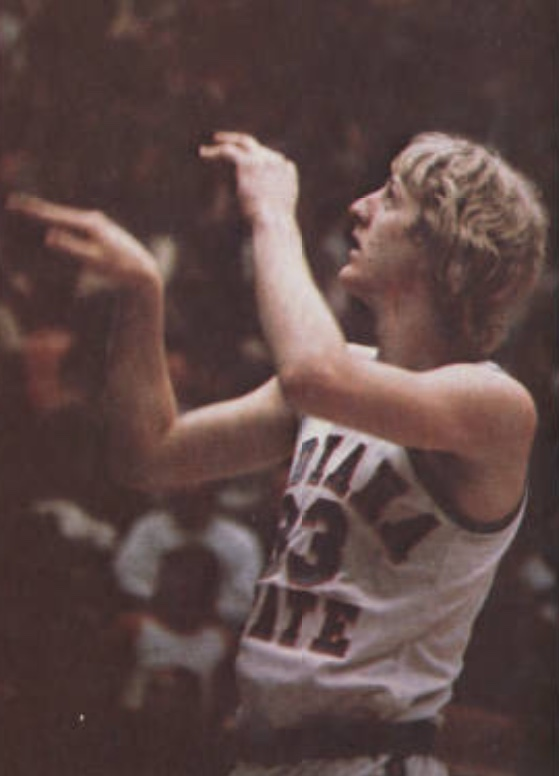
Larry Bird, Indiana State, 1979

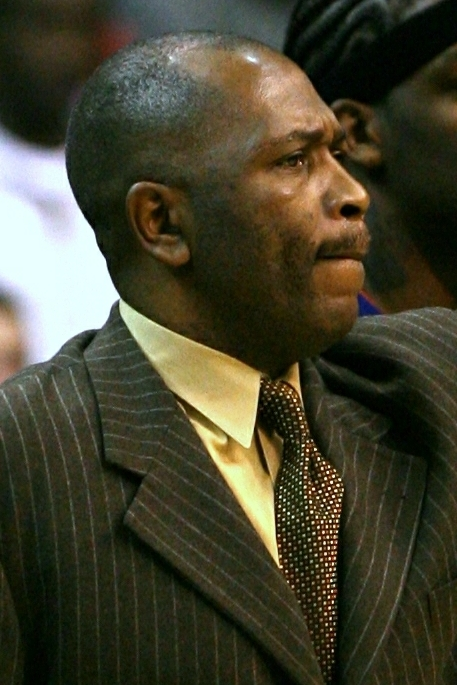
Mark Aguirre, DePaul, 1980

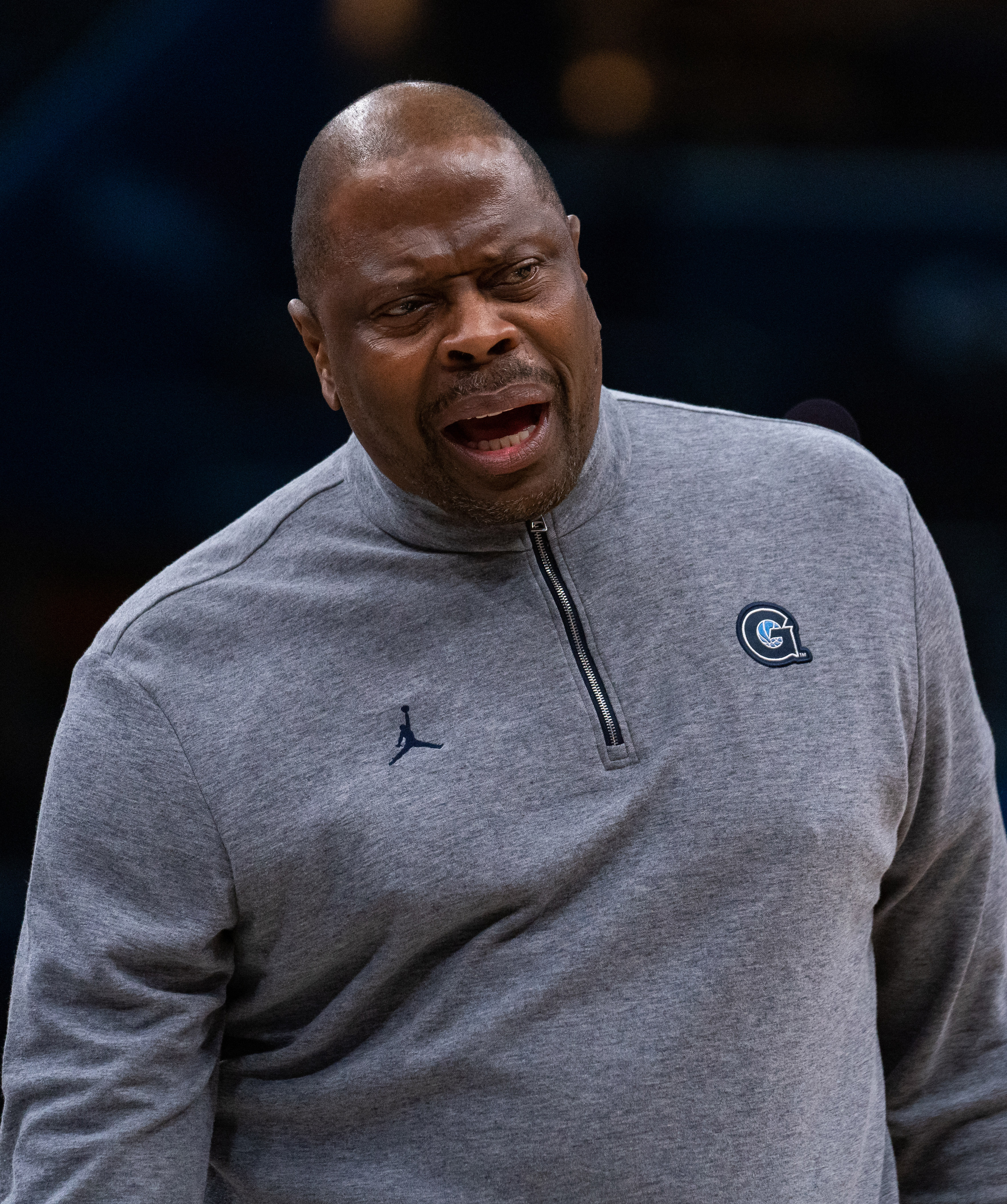
Patrick Ewing, Georgetown, 1985

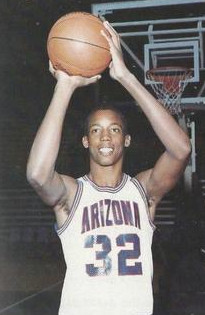
Sean Elliott, Arizona, 1989

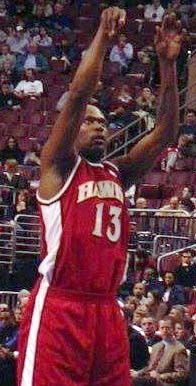
Glenn Robinson, Purdue, 1994

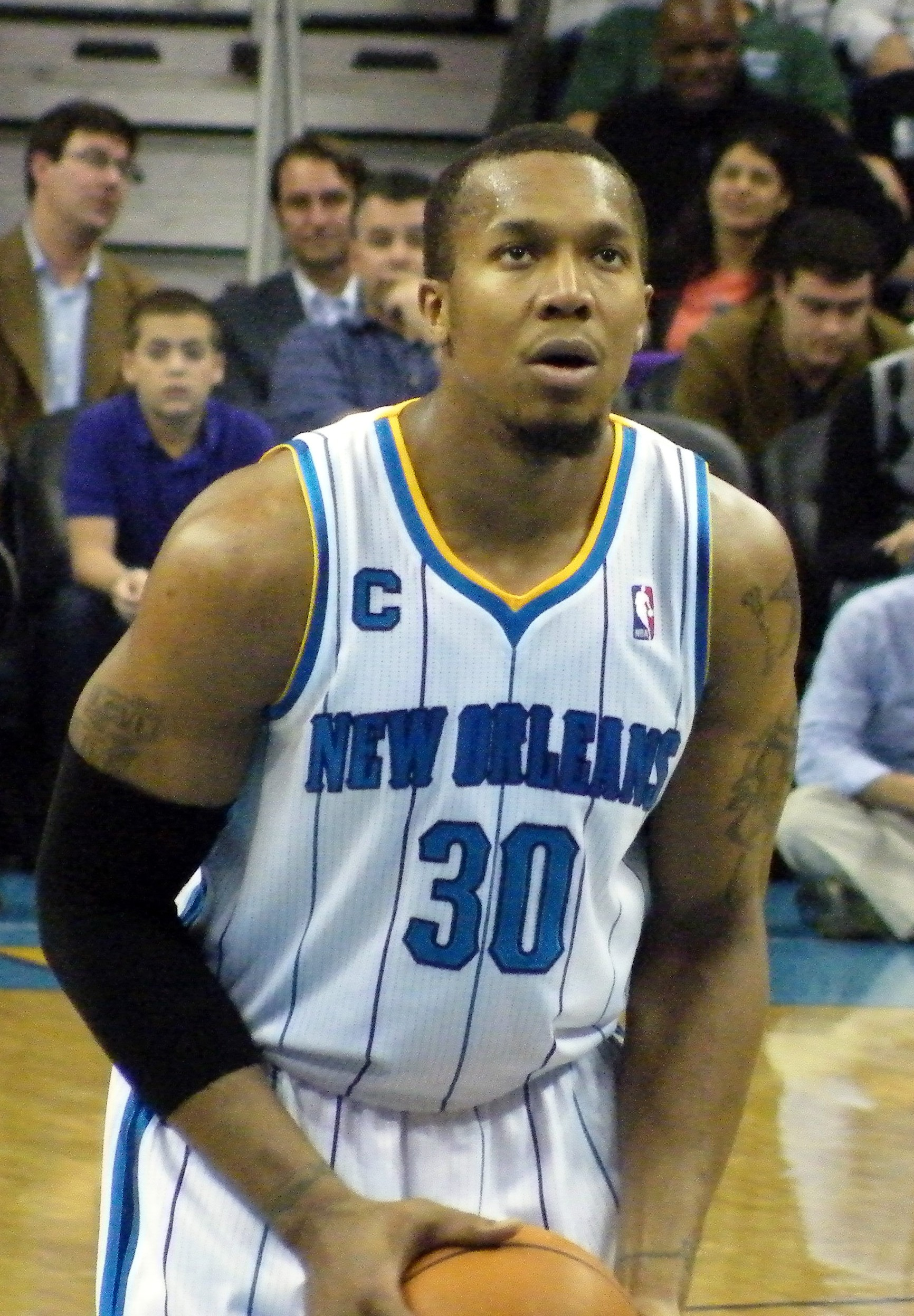
David West, Xavier, 2003

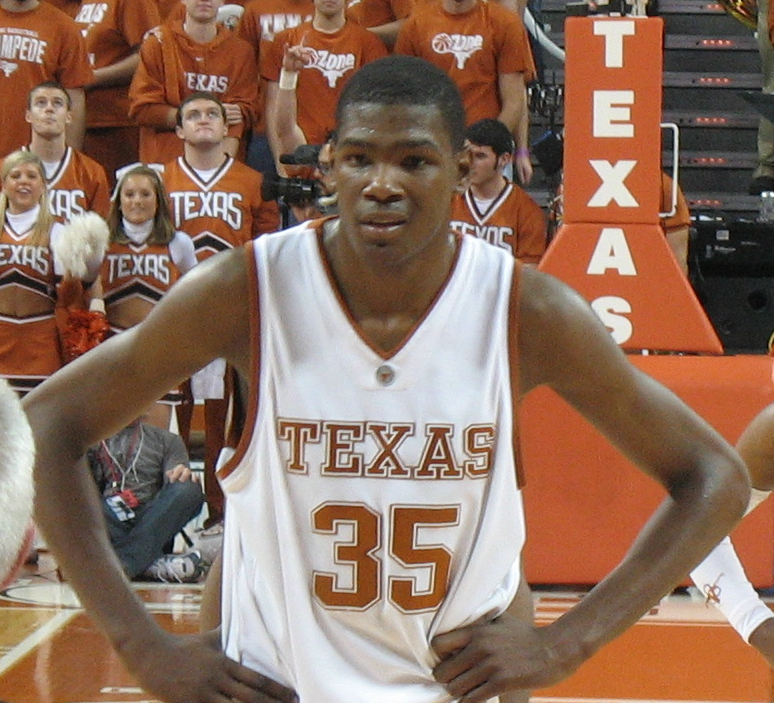
Kevin Durant, Texas, 2007

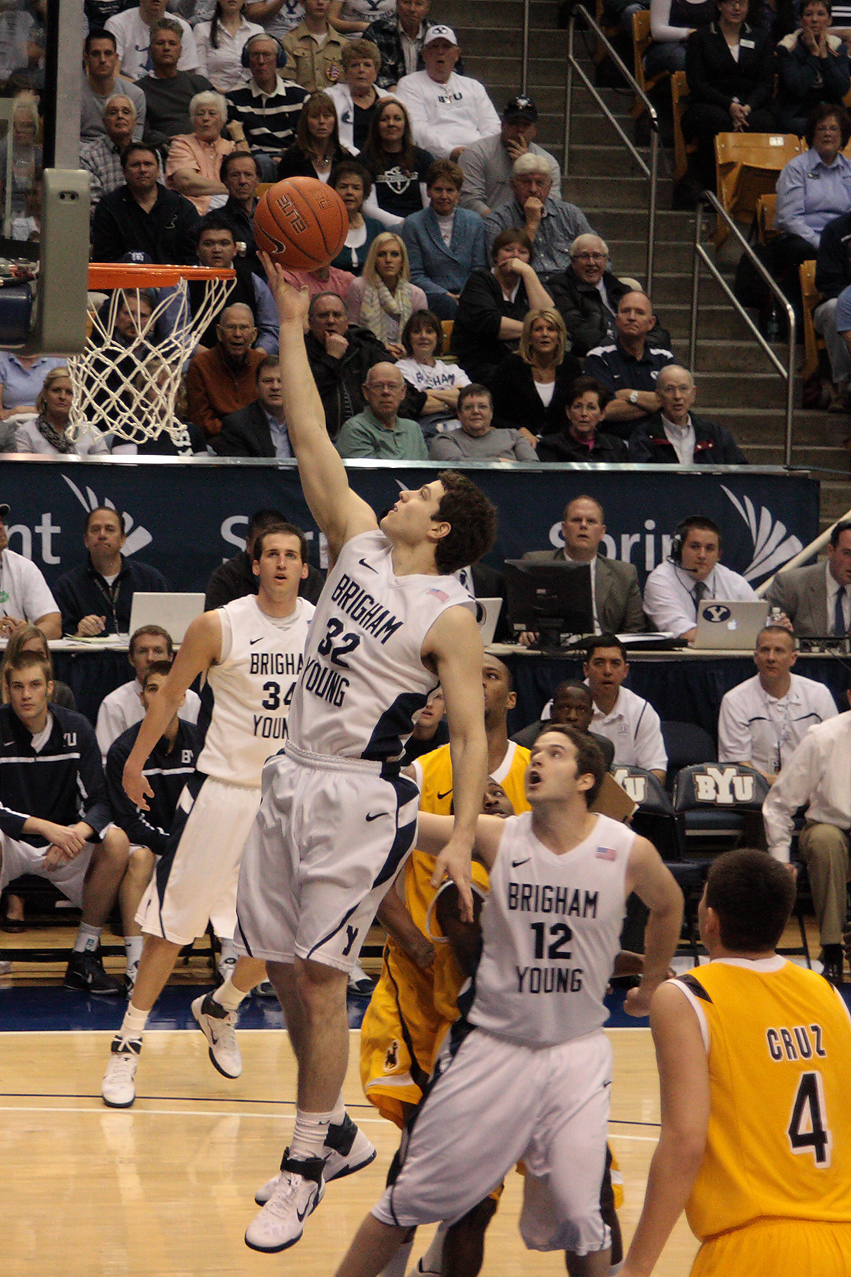
Jimmer Fredette, BYU, 2011

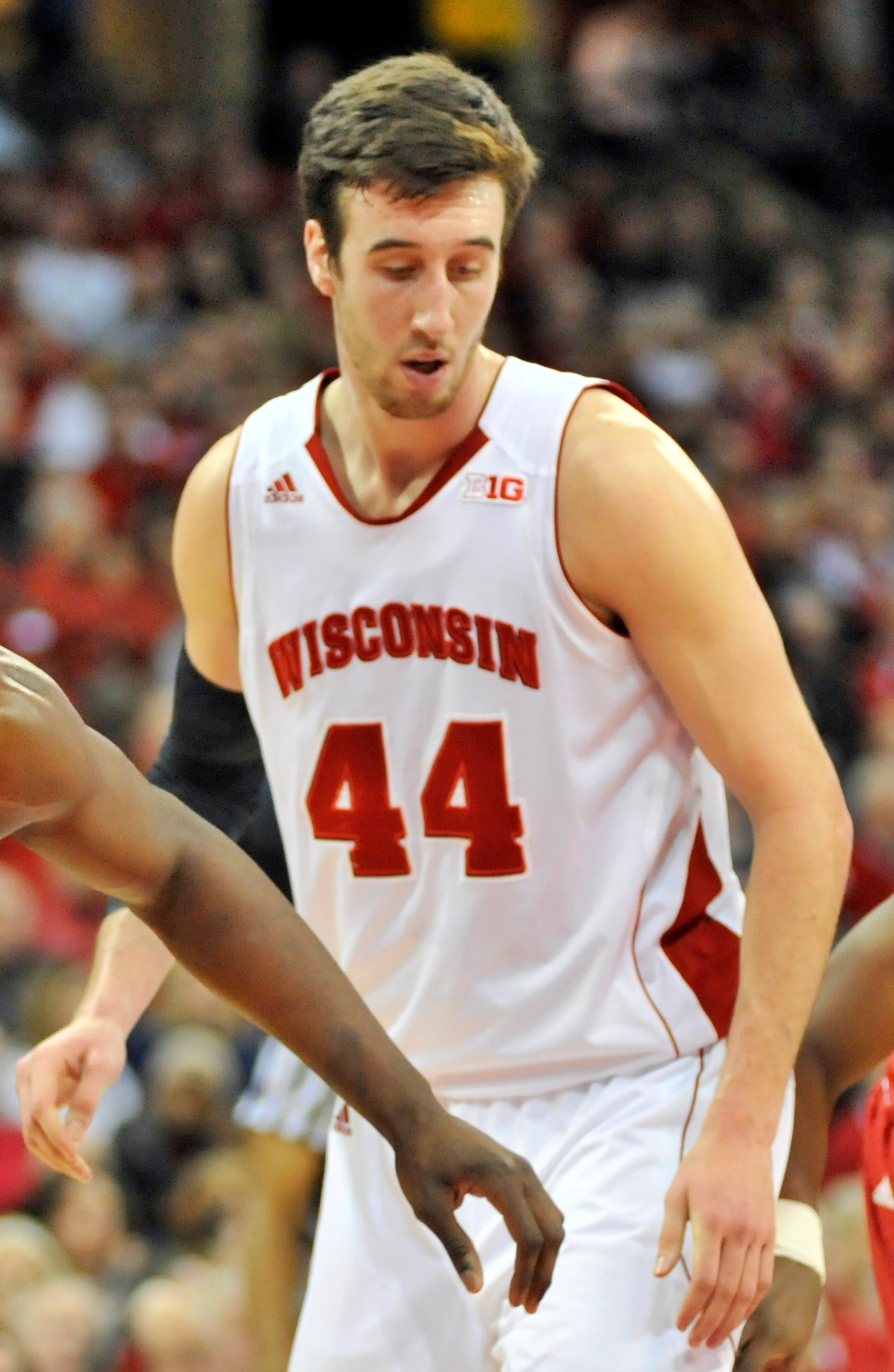
Frank Kaminsky, Wisconsin, 2015

Season	Player	School	Position	Class	Reference
1971–72	Bill Walton	UCLA	C	Sophomore	
1972–73	Bill Walton (2)	UCLA	C	Junior	
1973–74	Bill Walton (3)	UCLA	C	Senior	
1974–75	David Thompson	NC State	SG / SF	Senior	
1975–76	Scott May	Indiana	F	Senior	
1976–77	Marques Johnson	UCLA	G / F	Senior	
1977–78	Butch Lee	Marquette	PG	Senior	
1978–79	Larry Bird	Indiana State	SF	Senior	
1979–80	Mark Aguirre	DePaul	SF	Sophomore	
1980–81	Ralph Sampson	Virginia	C	Sophomore	
1981–82	Ralph Sampson (2)	Virginia	C	Junior	
1982–83	Ralph Sampson (3)	Virginia	C	Senior	
1983–84	Michael Jordan	North Carolina	SG	Junior	
1984–85	Patrick Ewing	Georgetown	C	Senior	
1985–86	Walter Berry	St. John's	PF	Senior	
1986–87	David Robinson	Navy	C	Senior	
1987–88	Hersey Hawkins	Bradley	SG	Senior	
1988–89	Sean Elliott	Arizona	SF	Senior	
1989–90	Lionel Simmons	La Salle	SF	Senior	
1990–91	Shaquille O'Neal	LSU	C	Sophomore	
1991–92	Christian Laettner	Duke	F	Senior	
1992–93	Calbert Cheaney	Indiana	SF	Senior	
1993–94	Glenn Robinson	Purdue	SF / PF	Junior	
1994–95	Joe Smith	Maryland	C	Sophomore	
1995–96	Marcus Camby	UMass	C	Junior	
1996–97	Tim Duncan	Wake Forest	C	Senior	
1997–98	Antawn Jamison	North Carolina	SF	Junior	
1998–99	Elton Brand	Duke	C	Sophomore	
1999–00	Kenyon Martin	Cincinnati	PF	Senior	
2000–01	Shane Battier	Duke	SF / SG	Senior	
2001–02	Jason Williams	Duke	PG	Junior	
2002–03	David West	Xavier	PF	Senior	
2003–04	Jameer Nelson	Saint Joseph's	PG	Senior	
2004–05	JJ Redick	Duke	SG	Junior	
2005–06	JJ Redick (2)	Duke	SG	Senior	
2006–07	Kevin Durant	Texas	SF	Freshman	
2007–08	Tyler Hansbrough	North Carolina	PF	Junior	
2008–09	Blake Griffin	Oklahoma	PF	Sophomore	
2009–10	John Wall	Kentucky	PG	Freshman	
2010–11	Jimmer Fredette	BYU	PG	Senior	
2011–12	Anthony Davis	Kentucky	C	Freshman	
2012–13	Victor Oladipo	Indiana	SG	Junior	
2013–14	Doug McDermott	Creighton	SF	Senior	
2014–15	Frank Kaminsky	Wisconsin	PF	Senior	

== See also ==
- Adolph Rupp Cup – an award that was given annually to the nation's top NCAA Division I men's basketball coach from 2004 to 2015
