= 1988 MAAC men's basketball tournament =

- Classification: Division I
- Season: 1987–88
- Teams: 8
- First round site: Campus Sites; Campus Arenas
- Finals site: Meadowlands Arena; East Rutherford, NJ
- Champions: La Salle (1st title)
- Winning coach: Speedy Morris (1st title)
- MVP: Rich Tarr (La Salle)

1987–88 MAAC men's basketball standings
	Conf.				Overall
Team	W		L	PCT	W		L	PCT
La Salle †	14	–	0	1.000	24	–	10	.706
Saint Peter's	11	–	3	.786	20	–	9	.690
Fordham	9	–	5	.643	18	–	15	.545
Holy Cross	8	–	6	.571	14	–	15	.483
Iona	5	–	9	.357	11	–	16	.407
Army	4	–	10	.286	9	–	19	.321
Fairfield	4	–	10	.286	8	–	20	.286
Manhattan	1	–	13	.071	7	–	23	.233
† 1988 MAAC tournament winner Rankings from AP Poll

The 1988 MAAC men's basketball tournament was held March 2–7 at a combination of on-campus gymnasiums and the Meadowlands Arena in East Rutherford, New Jersey. This was the first edition of the tournament.

Top-seeded La Salle defeated Fordham in the championship game, 79–70, to win their first MAAC men's basketball tournament.

The Explorers received an automatic bid to the 1988 NCAA tournament as the #13 seed in the Midwest region.

== Format ==
All eight of the conference's members participated in the tournament field. They were seeded based on regular season conference records.

First Round games were played at the home court of the higher-seeded team. All remaining games were played at a neutral site at the Meadowlands Arena in East Rutherford, New Jersey.

== Bracket ==
Quarterfinals; Friday, March 2
1	La Salle	62
8	Manhattan	51
4	Holy Cross	91
5	Iona	85
3	Fordham	101
6	Army	59
2	Saint Peter's	63
7	Fairfield	60

Semifinals; Saturday, March 5
1	La Salle	88
4	Holy Cross	64
3	Fordham	53
2	St. Peter's	52

Championship; Sunday, March 7
1	La Salle	79
3	Fordham	70
