= 1987–88 La Salle Explorers men's basketball team =

American college basketball season

1987–88 La Salle Explorers men's basketball

MAAC regular season champion MAAC Tournament champion

NCAA Division I Tournament, First Round
- Conference: Metro Atlantic Athletic Conference
- Record: 24–10 (14–0 MAAC)
- Head coach: Speedy Morris (2nd season)
- Assistant coach: Joe Mihalich
- Home arena: Convention Hall

1987–88 MAAC men's basketball standings
	Conf.				Overall
Team	W		L	PCT	W		L	PCT
La Salle †	14	–	0	1.000	24	–	10	.706
Saint Peter's	11	–	3	.786	20	–	9	.690
Fordham	9	–	5	.643	18	–	15	.545
Holy Cross	8	–	6	.571	14	–	15	.483
Iona	5	–	9	.357	11	–	16	.407
Army	4	–	10	.286	9	–	19	.321
Fairfield	4	–	10	.286	8	–	20	.286
Manhattan	1	–	13	.071	7	–	23	.233
† 1988 MAAC tournament winner Rankings from AP Poll

The 1987–88 La Salle Explorers men's basketball team represented La Salle University during the 1987–88 NCAA Division I men's basketball season.

== Roster ==
1987–88 La Salle Explorers men's basketball team
Players
Coaches

Pos.	#	Name	Height	Weight	Year	Previous school	Hometown
G	11	Doug Overton	6 ft 3 in (1.91 m)	190 lb (86 kg)	Fr	Dobbins Technical	Philadelphia, PA
F	22	Lionel Simmons	6 ft 7 in (2.01 m)	210 lb (95 kg)	So	South Philadelphia	Philadelphia, PA
G		Tim Legler	6 ft 4 in (1.93 m)	190 lb (86 kg)	Sr	John Randolph Tucker

Head coach

- Speedy Morris

Assistant coach(es)

- Joe Mihalich (La Salle)

Legend

- (C) Team captain
- (S) Suspended
- (I) Ineligible
- (W) Walk-on
- Injured
- Current redshirt

Roster

== Regular season ==
=== Player stats ===
Player	Games	Field goals	Three Pointers	Free Throws	Rebounds	Blocks	Steals	Points
Lionel Simmons	34	297	2	196	386	77	71	792
Tim Legler	34	203	104	57	139	9	31	567

== NCAA tournament ==
- Midwest
  - Kansas State (#4 seed) 66, La Salle (#13 seed) 53

== Awards and honors ==
- Lionel Simmons, First Team All-Big 5 selection
- Lionel Simmons, Robert V. Geasey Trophy
- Lionel Simmons, Metro Atlantic Athletic Conference Player of the Year
