= 1991–92 La Salle Explorers men's basketball team =

American college basketball season

1991–92 La Salle Explorers men's basketball

MAAC tournament champion

NCAA Division I tournament, first round
- Conference: Metro Atlantic Athletic Conference
- Record: 20–11 (12–4 MAAC)
- Head coach: Speedy Morris (6th season)
- Assistant coaches: Joe Mihalich; Randy Monroe; Sam Rines
- Home arena: Convention Hall

1991–92 MAAC men's basketball standings
	Conf.				Overall
Team	W		L	PCT	W		L	PCT
Manhattan	13	–	3	.813	25	–	9	.735
La Salle †	12	–	4	.750	20	–	11	.645
Siena	11	–	5	.688	19	–	10	.655
Loyola (MD)	10	–	6	.625	14	–	14	.500
Iona	8	–	8	.500	14	–	15	.483
Niagara	8	–	8	.500	14	–	14	.500
Fairfield	4	–	12	.250	8	–	20	.286
Saint Peter's	3	–	13	.188	8	–	21	.276
Canisius	3	–	13	.188	8	–	22	.267
† 1992 MAAC tournament winner Rankings from AP Poll

The 1991–92 La Salle Explorers men's basketball team represented La Salle University during the 1991–92 NCAA Division I men's basketball season. Led by sixth-year head coach Speedy Morris, the team finished second in the conference regular season standings. The Explorers won the MAAC tournament to gain an automatic bid to the NCAA tournament as the No. 13 seed in the East region. La Salle would lose in the opening round to Seton Hall, a game they led by as many as 8 points, 78–76.

== Roster ==
1991–92 La Salle Explorers men's basketball team
Players
Coaches

Pos.	#	Name	Height	Weight	Year	Previous school	Hometown
G	10	Keith Morris	5 ft 10 in (1.78 m)	—	Sr	Penn Charter	Philadelphia, PA
G	14	Randy Woods	5 ft 10 in (1.78 m)	180 lb (82 kg)	Sr	Benjamin Franklin	Philadelphia, PA
G	24	Jeff Neubauer	6 ft 4 in (1.93 m)	—	Jr	Slidell	Slidell, LA
G	25	Jack Hurd	6 ft 6 in (1.98 m)	—	Sr	Warwick	Lititz, PA
G	35	Mike Bergin	6 ft 4 in (1.93 m)	—	Jr	St. John's	College Park, MD
C	44	Milko Lieverst	6 ft 9 in (2.06 m)	—	Sr	Sweelinck	Amsterdam, Netherlands
F	51	Bron Holland	6 ft 8 in (2.03 m)	—	Sr	Bangor	Bangor, PA
C	52	Don Shelton	6 ft 8 in (2.03 m)	—	Sr	Trenton Central	Trenton, NJ

Head coach

- Speedy Morris

Assistant coach(es)

- Joe Mihalich (La Salle)
- Randy Monroe (Cheyney)
- Sam Rines (Cheyney)
- Rich Prendergast (La Salle)

Legend

- (C) Team captain
- (S) Suspended
- (I) Ineligible
- (W) Walk-on
- Injured
- Current redshirt

Roster

== Schedule and results ==
Date time, TV	Rank^{#}	Opponent^{#}	Result	Record	Site (attendance) city, state
Regular season
Nov 29, 1991*		vs. California	W 99–76	1–0	Robins Center; Richmond, Virginia
Nov 30, 1991*		at Richmond	L 63–78	1–1	Robins Center; Richmond, Virginia
Dec 7, 1991		Siena	L 65–68	1–2 (0–1)	Convention Hall; Philadelphia, Pennsylvania
Dec 9, 1991*		vs. Villanova	W 79–75	2–2	
Dec 21, 1991*		Princeton	L 46–47	2–3	Convention Hall; Philadelphia, Pennsylvania
Jan 9, 1992*		Notre Dame	L 79–87	4–5	Convention Hall; Philadelphia, Pennsylvania
Jan 23, 1992*		at Temple	W 78–67	8–6	McGonigle Hall; Philadelphia, Pennsylvania
Feb 15, 1992*		at BYU	W 81–80	12–9	Marriott Center; Provo, Utah
MAAC Tournament
Mar 6, 1992*	(2)	vs. (7) Fairfield; Quarterfinals	W 88–66	18–10	Knickerbocker Arena; Loudonville, New York
Mar 8, 1992*	(2)	at (3) Siena; Semifinals	W 84–71	19–10	Knickerbocker Arena; Loudonville, New York
Mar 9, 1992*	(2)	vs. (1) Manhattan; Championship Game	W 79–78	20–10	Knickerbocker Arena; Loudonville, New York
NCAA Tournament
Mar 19, 1992*	(13 E)	vs. (4 E) No. 19 Seton Hall; First Round	L 76–78	20–11	Greensboro Coliseum; Greensboro, North Carolina
*Non-conference game. ^{#}Rankings from AP Poll. (#) Tournament seedings in parentheses. E=East.

== Awards and honors ==
- Randy Woods, MAAC Player of the Year

== Team players drafted into the NBA ==
Year	Round	Pick	Player	NBA club
1992	1	16	Randy Woods	Los Angeles Clippers
