= Ron Haigler =

American basketball player and coach

Personal information
- Born: 1953 (age 72–73) Brooklyn, New York, U.S.
- Listed height: 6 ft 8 in (2.03 m)
- Listed weight: 195 lb (88 kg)

Career information
- High school: James Madison (Brooklyn, New York)
- College: Penn (1972–1975)
- NBA draft: 1975: 4th round, 68th overall pick
- Drafted by: Chicago Bulls
- Playing career: 1975–1985
- Position: Power forward
- Coaching career: 1975–1978

Career history

Playing
- 1975–1976: Scranton Apollos
- 1976–1978: Wilkes-Barre Barons
- 1978–1984: Eczacıbaşı
- 1979–1980: Pennsylvania Barons
- 1984–1985: Efes Pilsen

Coaching
- 1975–1977: Penn Charter School (assistant)
- 1977–1978: Penn (assistant)

Career highlights
- EBA Playoff/Finals MVP (1977); All-EBA Second Team (1977); Ivy League Player of the Year (1975); 2× Robert V. Geasey Trophy (1974, 1975)
- Stats at Basketball Reference

Ronald Haigler (born 1953) is an American former basketball player and current high school basketball coach. He is best known for his collegiate career at the University of Pennsylvania between 1972–73 and 1974–75. A 6'8" power forward, Haigler helped guide the Quakers to several consecutive Ivy League titles as well as setting numerous offensive statistical records at Penn. He was named the first ever Ivy League Men's Basketball Player of the Year as a senior and was twice named the Philadelphia Big 5 Player of the Year.

After college, he was chosen as the 68th overall pick in the 1975 NBA draft by the Chicago Bulls. He was also chosen in the 1975 ABA Draft by the Memphis Sounds as the 23rd overall pick, but Haigler ultimately did not play in either league. Haigler played in the Eastern Basketball Association (EBA) / Continental Basketball Association (CBA) for the Scranton Apollos and Wilkes-Barre / Pennsylvania Barons. He was selected as the EBA Playoff/Finals Most Valuable Player and a member of the All-EBA Second Team in 1977. He played for seven seasons in the Turkish Basketball League for Eczacıbaşı (1978 to 1984) and Efes Pilsen (1984–85). As of 2016, he coaches high school girls basketball in Strawberry Mansion, Philadelphia, Pennsylvania.
