= Lionel Simmons =

American basketball player (born 1968)

Personal information
- Born: November 14, 1968 (age 58) Philadelphia, Pennsylvania, U.S.
- Listed height: 6 ft 7 in (2.01 m)
- Listed weight: 210 lb (95 kg)

Career information
- High school: South Philadelphia (Philadelphia, Pennsylvania)
- College: La Salle (1986–1990)
- NBA draft: 1990: 1st round, 7th overall pick
- Drafted by: Sacramento Kings
- Playing career: 1990–1997
- Position: Small forward
- Number: 22

Career history
- 1990–1997: Sacramento Kings

Career highlights
- NBA All-Rookie First Team (1991); National college player of the year (1990); Consensus first-team All-American (1990); Consensus second-team All-American (1989); Third-team All-American – UPI (1988); 3× MAAC Player of the Year (1988–1990); 3× First-team All-MAAC (1988–1990); No. 22 retired by La Salle Explorers

Career NBA statistics
- Points: 5,833 (12.8 ppg)
- Rebounds: 2,833 (6.2 rpg)
- Assists: 1,498 (3.3 apg)
- Stats at NBA.com
- Stats at Basketball Reference
- Collegiate Basketball Hall of Fame
Medals
Men's basketball
Representing United States
FIBA Americas Championship
Silver medal – second place	1989 Mexico City	Team competition
FIBA U19 World Championship
Silver medal – second place	1987 Bormio	Team competition

Lionel James "L-Train" Simmons (born November 14, 1968) is an American former professional basketball player. Simmons played seven seasons for the Sacramento Kings of the National Basketball Association (NBA). He was a highly-decorated college player for the La Salle Explorers, where he was a three-time All-American and the 1990 National Player of the Year. Simmons is one of the leading scorers in men's basketball history and is one of only 12 players to have scored over 3,000 points in NCAA Division I history.

== Early life ==
Simmons led South Philadelphia High School to a Philadelphia Public League boys' championship in 1986, earning an MVP award in the process. He was inducted into the Philadelphia Sports Hall of Fame in 2008.

== College career ==
Simmons was a 6'7" small forward from La Salle University, where he won the Naismith College Player of the Year and John R. Wooden Award as a senior. Simmons is fifth in all-time NCAA career points with 3,217 and trails only Pete Maravich, Antoine Davis, Freeman Williams and Chris Clemons. Simmons became the first player in NCAA history to score more than 3,000 points and pull down more than 1,100 rebounds. He holds the NCAA Basketball record for most consecutive games scoring in double figures with 115. He led the Explorers to three straight NCAA Tournament appearances (1988–90). Simmons was Player of the Year in the Metro Atlantic Athletic Conference for three years. He was a four-time First Team All Big 5 selection and won the Robert V. Geasey Trophy as Big 5 MVP three times. During his career, the Explorers had a 100–31 record. Simmons was inducted into the La Salle University Hall of Athletes in 1995. Simmons was inducted into the Big 5 Hall of Fame in 1996.

=== College statistics ===
Year	Team	GP	GS	MPG	FG%	3P%	FT%	RPG	APG	SPG	BPG	PPG
1986–87	La Salle	33	33	38.0	.526	.333	.763	9.8	1.8	1.6	1.4	20.3
1987–88	La Salle	34	34	39.0	.485	.250	.757	11.4	2.5	2.1	2.3	23.3
1988–89	La Salle	32	32	38.9	.487	.375	.711	11.4	3.0	1.7	1.9	28.4
1989–90	La Salle	32	32	38.1	.513	.477	.661	11.1	3.6	1.9	2.0	26.5
Career		131	131	38.5	.501	.415	.722	10.9	2.7	1.8	1.9	24.6

== Professional career ==
Simmons was selected by the Sacramento Kings with the seventh pick of the 1990 NBA draft. On March 23, 1991, Simmons scored a career-high 42 points in a 100–95 loss to the Phoenix Suns. He was the runner-up to Derrick Coleman for the 1991 NBA Rookie of the Year Award. Simmons was NBA Player of the Week the week after the All-Star break during his rookie season.

He played seven seasons for the Kings, scoring 5,833 career points, until prematurely retiring in 1997 due to chronic injuries. He earned more than $21 million in a pro career that lasted seven seasons.

== See also ==
- List of NCAA Division I men's basketball players with 2,000 points and 1,000 rebounds
- List of NCAA Division I men's basketball career scoring leaders
