= Randy Woods =

American basketball player (born 1970)

Personal information
- Born: September 23, 1970 (age 56) Philadelphia, Pennsylvania, U.S.
- Listed height: 5 ft 10 in (1.78 m)
- Listed weight: 185 lb (84 kg)

Career information
- High school: Benjamin Franklin (Philadelphia, Pennsylvania)
- College: La Salle (1988–1992)
- NBA draft: 1992: 1st round, 16th overall pick
- Drafted by: Los Angeles Clippers
- Playing career: 1992–1999
- Position: Point guard
- Number: 14, 10

Career history
- 1992–1995: Los Angeles Clippers
- 1995: Denver Nuggets
- 1996: Quad City Thunder
- 1996–1997: Oklahoma City Cavalry
- 1997–1998: Sioux Falls Skyforce
- 1998: Yakima Sun Kings
- 1998: Caja San Fernando
- 1998–1999: Yakima Sun Kings
- 1999: Papagou

Career highlights
- MAAC Player of the Year (1992); 2× First-team All-MAAC (1991, 1992); Robert V. Geasey Trophy (1992)
- Stats at NBA.com
- Stats at Basketball Reference

Randolph Woods (born September 23, 1970) is an American former professional basketball player.

== College career ==
In college, Woods tallied 1,811 points in three seasons, ranking him fifth on La Salle's all-time scoring list at end of his career. He finished first in total points (847) and fifth in points-per-game (27.3) among all Division I players in 1992. The 1992 MAAC Player of the Year, Woods received the Geasey Award as the Big 5 Player of the Year in 1992 and was inducted into the Big 5 Hall of Fame in 1998. He was also inducted into the La Salle Hall of Athletes in 2003.

== Professional career ==
Woods was selected by the Los Angeles Clippers with the 16th overall pick of the 1992 NBA draft. Woods played in four NBA seasons for the Clippers and Denver Nuggets, averaging 2.4 ppg in his career.
