= Manhattan Jaspers men's basketball statistical leaders =

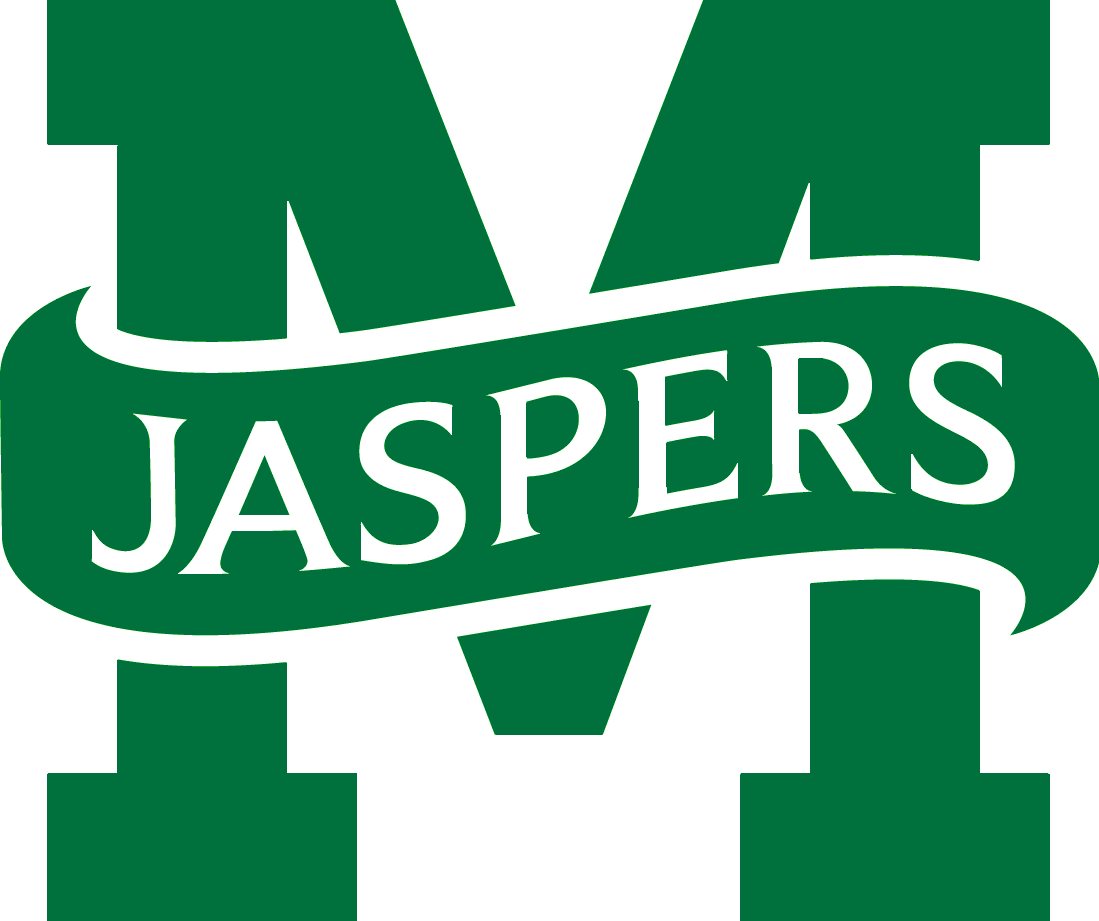

The Manhattan Jaspers basketball statistical leaders are individual statistical leaders of the Manhattan Jaspers basketball program in various categories, including points, rebounds, assists, steals, and blocks. Within those areas, the lists identify single-game, single-season, and career leaders. The Jaspers represent Manhattan College in the NCAA's Metro Atlantic Athletic Conference.

Manhattan began competing in intercollegiate basketball in 1904. However, the school's record book does not generally list records from before the 1950s, as records from before this period are often incomplete and inconsistent. Since scoring was much lower in this era, and teams played much fewer games during a typical season, it is likely that few or no players from this era would appear on these lists anyway.

The NCAA did not officially record assists as a stat until the 1983–84 season, and blocks and steals until the 1985–86 season, but Manhattan's record books includes players in these stats before these seasons. These lists are updated through the end of the 2021–22 season.

== Scoring ==
Career
| Rk | Player | Points | Seasons |
|---|---|---|---|
| 1 | Luis Flores | 2046 | 2001–02 2002–03 2003–04 |
| 2 | Keith Bullock | 1992 | 1989–90 1990–91 1991–92 1992–93 |
| 3 | Tim Cain | 1872 | 1981–82 1982–83 1983–84 1984–85 |
| 4 | George Beamon | 1843 | 2009–10 2010–11 2011–12 2012–13 2013–14 |
| 5 | Durelle Brown | 1634 | 1997–98 1998–99 1999–00 2000–01 |
| 6 | Peter Runge | 1622 | 1986–87 1987–88 1988–89 1989–90 |
| 7 | Steve Grant | 1610 | 1974–75 1975–76 1976–77 1977–78 |
| 8 | Shane Richards | 1472 | 2012–13 2013–14 2014–15 2015–16 |
| 9 | Larry Lembo | 1443 | 1962–63 1963–64 1964–65 |
| 10 | Darryl Crawford | 1431 | 2006–07 2007–08 2008–09 2009–10 |

Season
| Rk | Player | Points | Season |
|---|---|---|---|
| 1 | Luis Flores | 744 | 2003–04 |
| 2 | Luis Flores | 739 | 2002–03 |
| 3 | Bill Wheeler | 679 | 1987–88 |
| 4 | George Beamon | 626 | 2011–12 |
| 5 | Steve Grant | 614 | 1977–78 |
| 6 | Keith Bullock | 579 | 1991–92 |
| 7 | Durelle Brown | 576 | 1999–00 |
| 8 | Tom Lockhart | 568 | 1975–76 |
| 9 | Jose Perez | 567 | 2021–22 |
| 10 | George Beamon | 565 | 2013–14 |

Single game
| Rk | Player | Points | Season | Opponent |
|---|---|---|---|---|
| 1 | Bob Mealy | 51 | 1959–60 | CCNY |

== Rebounds ==
Career
| Rk | Player | Rebounds | Seasons |
|---|---|---|---|
| 1 | Bill Campion | 1070 | 1972–73 1973–74 1974–75 |
| 2 | Keith Bullock | 1012 | 1989–90 1990–91 1991–92 1992–93 |
| 3 | Steve Grant | 940 | 1974–75 1975–76 1976–77 1977–78 |
| 4 | Peter Runge | 894 | 1986–87 1987–88 1988–89 1989–90 |
| 5 | Bob Mealy | 872 | 1957–58 1958–59 1959–60 |
| 6 | Jason Hoover | 865 | 1993–94 1994–95 1995–96 1996–97 |
| 7 | Dave Holmes | 826 | 2000–01 2001–02 2002–03 2003–04 |
| 8 | Rhamel Brown | 810 | 2010–11 2011–12 2012–13 2013–14 |
| 9 | Emmy Andujar | 769 | 2011–12 2012–13 2013–14 2014–15 |
| 10 | Angelo Lombardo | 739 | 1954–55 1955–56 1956–57 |

Season
| Rk | Player | Rebounds | Season |
|---|---|---|---|
| 1 | Bill Campion | 419 | 1973–74 |
| 2 | Bill Campion | 402 | 1972–73 |
| 3 | John Marren | 385 | 1969–70 |
| 4 | Ed O'Connor | 337 | 1954–55 |
| 5 | Angelo Lombardo | 332 | 1955–56 |
| | Keith Bullock | 332 | 1992–93 |
| 7 | J. Willard Doran | 331 | 1952–53 |
| 8 | Steve Grant | 299 | 1976–77 |
| 9 | Angelo Lombardo | 288 | 1956–57 |
| 10 | Steve Grant | 287 | 1977–78 |

Single game
| Rk | Player | Rebounds | Season | Opponent |
|---|---|---|---|---|
| 1 | Bill Campion | 30 | 1972–73 | Hofstra |

== Assists ==
Career
| Rk | Player | Assists | Seasons |
|---|---|---|---|
| 1 | Ed Lawson | 447 | 1983–84 1984–85 1986–87 1987–88 |
| 2 | Phil Lane | 419 | 1996–97 1997–98 1998–99 1999–00 |
| 3 | Jaden Winston | 403 | 2023–24 2024–25 2025–26 |
| 4 | Charlie Mahoney | 384 | 1972–73 1973–74 1974–75 |
| 5 | Emmy Andujar | 367 | 2011–12 2012–13 2013–14 2014–15 |
| | Tom Courtney | 367 | 1975–76 1976–77 1977–78 1978–79 |
| 7 | Tyler Wilson | 364 | 2013–14 2014–15 2015–16 2016–17 |
| 8 | Michael Alvarado | 363 | 2010–11 2011–12 2012–13 2013–14 |
| 9 | Charles Dubra | 355 | 1988–89 1989–90 1990–91 1991–92 |
| 10 | Jason Wingate | 334 | 2002–03 2003–04 2004–05 2005–06 |

Season
| Rk | Player | Assists | Season |
|---|---|---|---|
| 1 | Phil Lane | 176 | 1999–00 |
| 2 | Mugsy Green | 166 | 2000–01 |
| 3 | Tyler Wilson | 161 | 2015–16 |
| 4 | Keaton Hyman | 151 | 1994–95 |
| 5 | Richie Garner | 150 | 1971–72 |
| 6 | Jaden Winston | 149 | 2023–24 |
| 7 | Mugsy Green | 142 | 2001–02 |
| 8 | Eric Marsh | 141 | 1975–76 |
| | Ant Nelson | 141 | 2022–23 |
| 10 | Charlie Mahoney | 136 | 1974–75 |
| | Charlie Mahoney | 136 | 1973–74 |
| | Jose Perez | 136 | 2021–22 |

Single game
| Rk | Player | Assists | Season | Opponent |
|---|---|---|---|---|
| 1 | Tom Courtney | 15 | 1978–79 | Columbia |

== Steals ==
Career
| Rk | Player | Steals | Seasons |
|---|---|---|---|
| 1 | Carey Wilson | 218 | 1989–90 1990–91 1991–92 1992–93 |
| 2 | Jaden Winston | 210 | 2023–24 2024–25 2025–26 |
| 3 | Ed Lawson | 201 | 1983–84 1984–85 1986–87 1987–88 |
| 4 | Emmy Andujar | 167 | 2011–12 2012–13 2013–14 2014–15 |
| 5 | George Beamon | 162 | 2009–10 2010–11 2011–12 2012–13 2013–14 |
| 6 | Luis Flores | 161 | 2001–02 2002–03 2003–04 |
| 7 | Michael Alvarado | 159 | 2010–11 2011–12 2012–13 2013–14 |
| 8 | Tarik Thacker | 154 | 1993–94 1994–95 1995–96 1996–97 |
| 9 | Billy Wheeler | 149 | 1986–87 1987–88 |
| 10 | Keith Bullock | 147 | 1989–90 1990–91 1991–92 1992–93 |
| | Patrick Bouli | 147 | 2006–07 2007–08 2008–09 2009–10 |

Season
| Rk | Player | Steals | Season |
|---|---|---|---|
| 1 | Jaden Winston | 83 | 2025–26 |
| 2 | Mugsy Green | 76 | 2001–02 |
| | Billy Wheeler | 76 | 1986–87 |
| 4 | Billy Wheeler | 73 | 1987–88 |
| 5 | Jeff Xavier | 70 | 2005–06 |
| 6 | Emmy Andujar | 65 | 2014–15 |
| | Jaden Winston | 65 | 2023–24 |
| 8 | Eric Marsh | 63 | 1975–76 |
| | Carey Wilson | 63 | 1991–92 |
| | Ed Lawson | 63 | 1986–87 |

Single game
| Rk | Player | Steals | Season | Opponent |
|---|---|---|---|---|
| 1 | Steve Boyle | 8 | 1985–86 | Holy Cross |
| | Steve Boyle | 8 | 1987–88 | Lehman |
| | Mugsy Green | 8 | 2001–02 | Fordham |
| | Michael Alvarado | 8 | 2011–12 | Marist |

== Blocks ==
Career
| Rk | Player | Blocks | Seasons |
|---|---|---|---|
| 1 | Rhamel Brown | 367 | 2010–11 2011–12 2012–13 2013–14 |
| 2 | Steve Grant | 220 | 1974–75 1975–76 1976–77 1977–78 |
| 3 | Arturo Dubois | 159 | 2004–05 2005–06 2006–07 |
| 4 | Pauly Paulicap | 148 | 2017–18 2018–19 2019–20 |
| 5 | Jamal Marshall | 129 | 1991–92 1992–93 1993–94 1994–95 |
| 6 | Dave Althaver | 94 | 1987–88 1988–89 1989–90 1990–91 |
| | Devon Austin | 94 | 2005–06 2006–07 2007–08 2008–09 |
| | Warren Williams | 94 | 2018–19 2019–20 2020–21 2021–22 |
| 9 | Jason Benton | 91 | 2001–02 2002–03 2003–04 |
| 10 | Josh Roberts | 90 | 2021–22 2022–23 |

Season
| Rk | Player | Blocks | Season |
|---|---|---|---|
| 1 | Rhamel Brown | 120 | 2013–14 |
| 2 | Rhamel Brown | 95 | 2012–13 |
| 3 | Rhamel Brown | 84 | 2011–12 |
| 4 | Pauly Paulicap | 78 | 2017–18 |
| 5 | Arturo Dubois | 74 | 2005–06 |
| 6 | Rhamel Brown | 68 | 2010–11 |
| 7 | Steve Grant | 67 | 1977–78 |
| 8 | Pauly Paulicap | 59 | 2019–20 |
| | Steve Grant | 59 | 1975–76 |
| 10 | Steve Grant | 54 | 1976–77 |
