= 2003 MAAC men's basketball tournament =

- Classification: Division I
- Season: 2002–03
- Teams: 10
- Site: Sovereign Bank Arena; Trenton, New Jersey
- Champions: Manhattan (2nd title)
- Winning coach: Bobby Gonzalez (1st title)
- MVP: Luis Flores (Manhattan)

2002–03 MAAC men's basketball standings
	Conf.				Overall
Team	W		L	PCT	W		L	PCT
Manhattan †	14	–	4	.778	23	–	7	.767
Fairfield	13	–	5	.722	19	–	12	.613
Siena	12	–	6	.667	21	–	11	.656
Niagara	12	–	6	.667	17	–	12	.586
Iona	11	–	7	.611	17	–	12	.586
Marist	8	–	10	.444	13	–	16	.448
Rider	7	–	11	.389	12	–	16	.429
Saint Peter's	6	–	12	.333	10	–	19	.345
Canisius	6	–	12	.333	10	–	18	.357
Loyola (MD)	1	–	17	.056	4	–	24	.143
† 2003 MAAC tournament winner

The 2003 MAAC men's basketball tournament was held March 7–10 at Sovereign Bank Arena in Trenton, New Jersey.

Top-seeded Manhattan defeated Fairfield in the championship game, 69–54, to win their second MAAC men's basketball tournament.

The Jaspers received an automatic bid to the 2003 NCAA tournament.

== Format ==
All ten of the conference's members participated in the tournament field. They were seeded based on regular season conference records.

As the regular-season champion, top seed Manhattan received a bye to the semifinals.

== Bracket ==
First round Friday, March 7
March 7
(5) Iona	62
(10) Loyola (MD)	39
March 7
(7) Rider	73
(8) Saint Peter's	77
March 7
(6) Marist	69
(9) Canisius	63

Quarterfinals; Saturday, March 8
March 8
(4) Niagara	81
(5) Iona	75
March 8
(2) Fairfield	68
(8) Saint Peter's	60
March 8
(3) Siena	70
(6) Marist	68

Semifinals; Sunday, March 9
March 9
(1) Manhattan	82
(4) Niagara	81
March 9
(2) Fairfield	67
(3) Siena	63

Final; Monday, March 10
March 10
(1) Manhattan	69
(2) Fairfield	54
