= Skip Prosser Man of the Year Award =

American collegiate men's basketball award

- Awarded for: the nation's men's head basketball coach in NCAA Division I competition who also displays moral integrity
- Country: United States
- Presented by: Collegeinsider.com

History
- First award: 2008
- Most recent: Chris Holtmann, DePaul
- Website: Official website

The Skip Prosser Man of the Year Award is an award given annually to the nation's men's head basketball coach in NCAA Division I competition who also displays moral integrity. The award was established in 2008 and is named for head coach Skip Prosser (1950–2007), who spent most of his coaching tenure at Xavier and Wake Forest. Prosser is the only coach in NCAA history to lead three separate teams to the NCAA tournament in each of his first seasons with the team. The award is traditionally announced each year in the host city of the NCAA tournament Final Four.

The selection process is:

- On-court success: The coach must demonstrate competitive success and leadership with their basketball program.
- Voting panel: The winner is chosen by a 10-member voting committee. This committee includes current and former head coaches, along with two senior staff members from Collegeinsider.com.

== Key ==
Coach (X)	Denotes the number of times the coach has been awarded the Skip Prosser Man of the Year Award at that point
W, L, W %	Total wins, total losses, win percentage
Finish	National postseason tournament result

== Winners ==
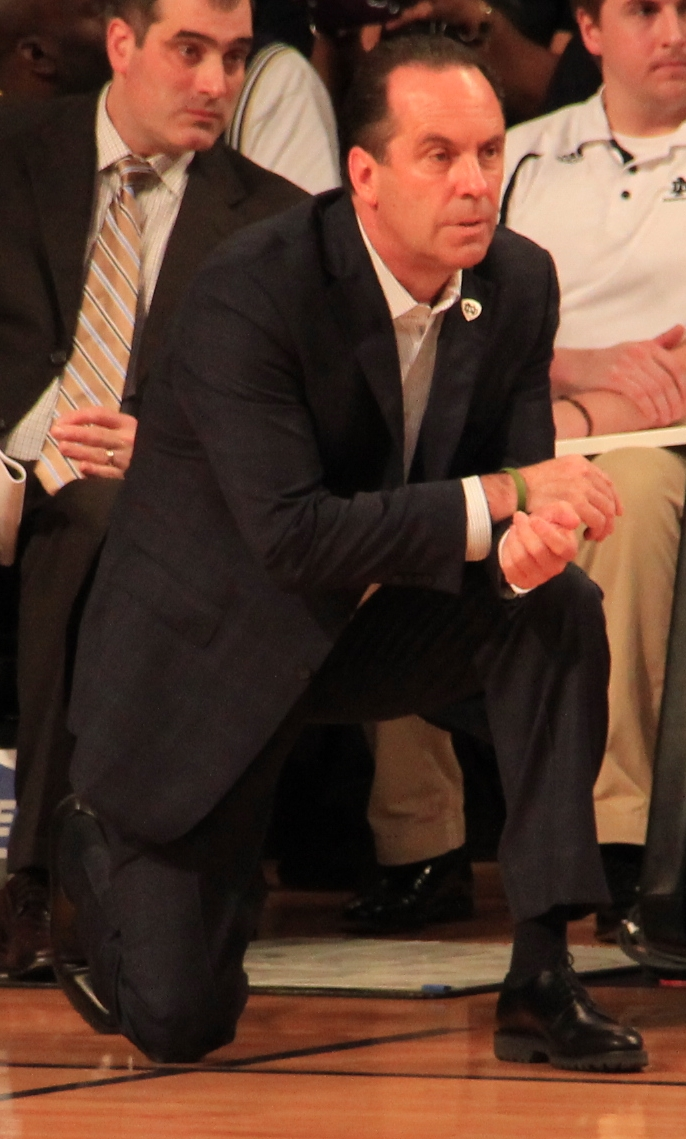
Mike Brey, Notre Dame, 2008

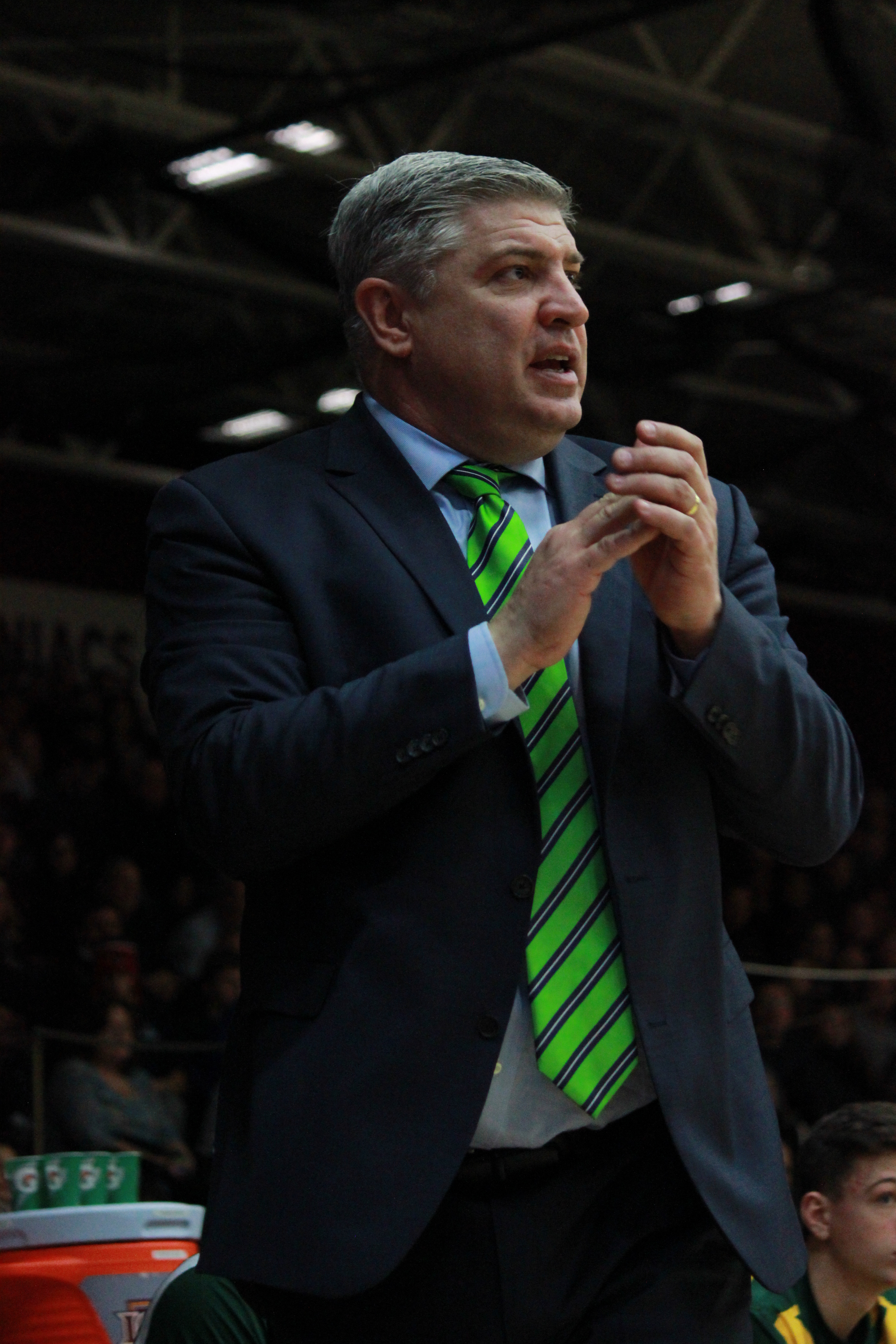
Jimmy Patsos, Loyola (Maryland), 2012

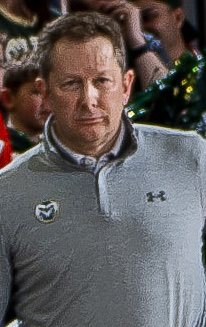
Niko Medved, Colorado State, 2024

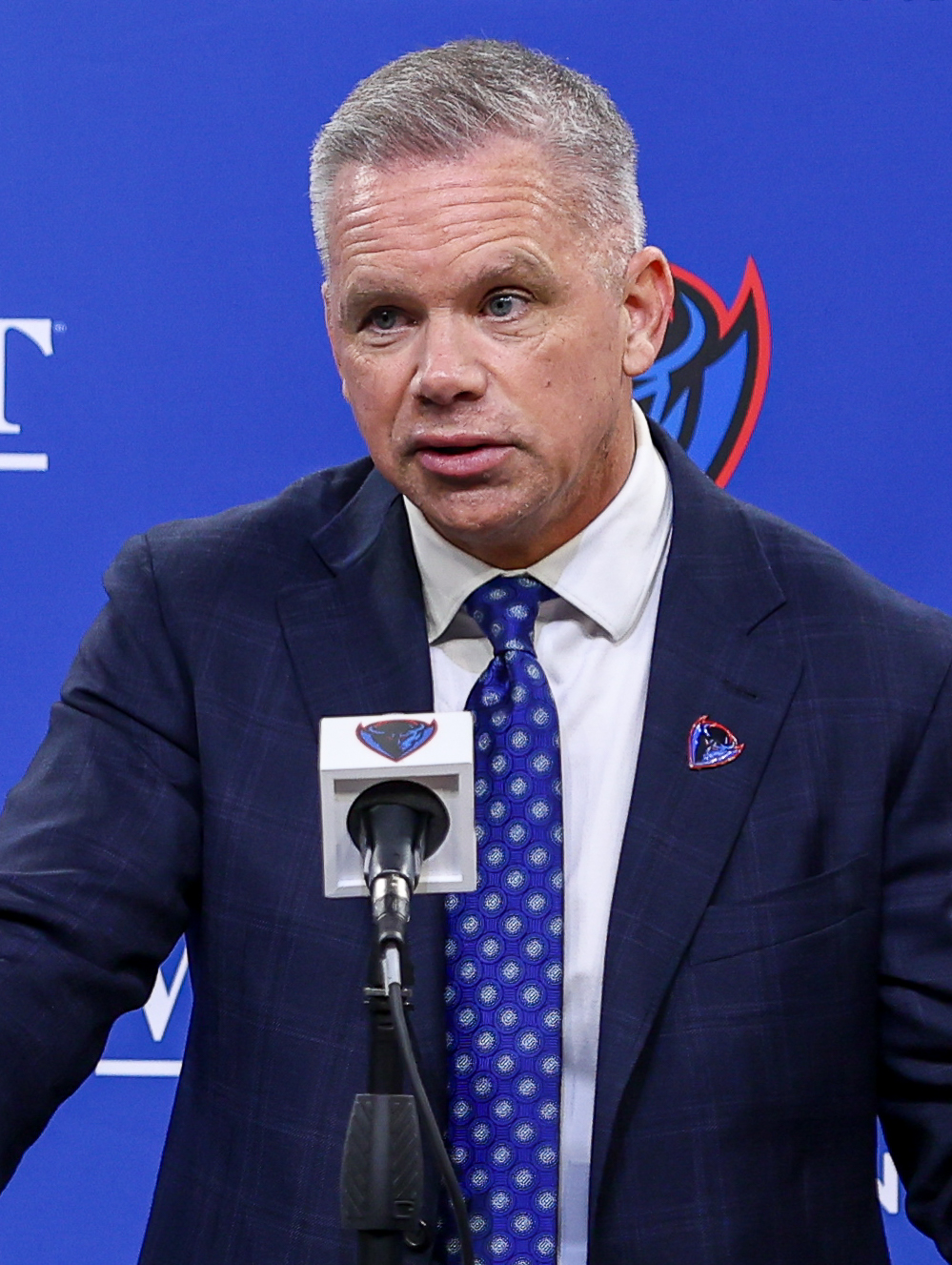
Chris Holtmann, DePaul, 2026

Season	Coach	School	W	L	W %	Finish	Reference
2007–08	Mike Brey	Notre Dame	25	8	.758	NCAA second round	
2008–09	Ed Conroy	The Citadel	20	13	.606	CIT first round	
2009–10	Bob Marlin	Sam Houston State	25	8	.758	NCAA first round	
2010–11	Chris Mack	Xavier	24	8	.750	NCAA first round	
2011–12	Jimmy Patsos	Loyola (Maryland)	24	9	.727	NCAA first round	
2012–13	Joe Mihalich	Niagara	19	14	.576	NIT first round	
2013–14	Brian Wardle	Green Bay	24	7	.774	NIT first round	
2014–15	Keno Davis	Central Michigan	23	9	.719	NIT first round	
2015–16	Zach Spiker	Army	19	14	.576	CIT first round	
2016–17	Danny Manning	Wake Forest	19	14	.576	NCAA First Four	
2017–18	Casey Alexander	Lipscomb	23	10	.697	NCAA first round	
2018–19	Robert Jones	Norfolk State	22	14	.611	NIT second round	
2019–20	Mark Prosser	Western Carolina	19	12	.613	N/A^{[a]}	
2020–21	Lew Hill^{[b]}	UTRGV	9	10	.474	—	
2021–22	Jay McAuley	Wofford	19	13	.594	TBC (withdrew)	
2022–23	Pat Skerry	Towson	21	12	.636	—	
2023–24	Niko Medved	Colorado State	25	11	.694	NCAA first round	
2024–25	Mark Byington	Vanderbilt	20	13	.606	NCAA first round	
2025–26	Chris Holtmann	DePaul	16	16	.500	—	

- ^{a} The COVID-19 pandemic caused the 2019–20 season to be canceled prior to any national postseason tournaments occurring.
- ^{b} Lew Hill died in his sleep on February 7, 2021 following a battle with the rare bone marrow disorder amyloid light-chain amyloidosis. UTRGV's record at the time was 9–10, and Hill's award was given posthumously.

== See also ==
- Kay Yow Award – an annual award given to an NCAA Division I women's basketball coach who exhibits moral character both on and off the court; the award is also presented by CollegeInsider.com
