= 2011–12 Marist Red Foxes men's basketball team =

American college basketball season

2011–12 Marist Red Foxes men's basketball
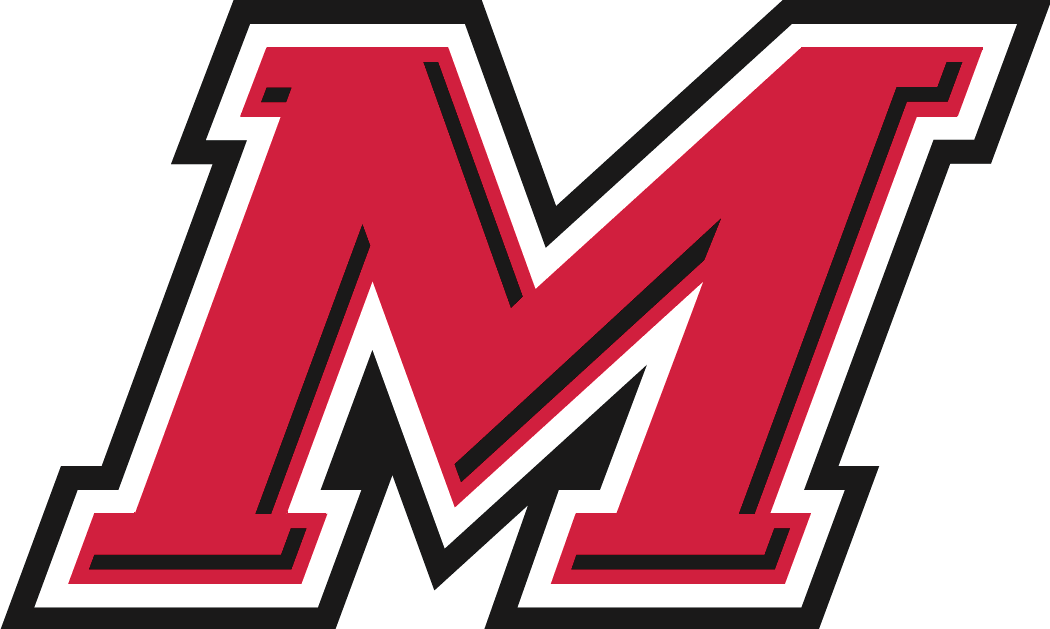
- Conference: Metro Atlantic Athletic Conference
- Record: 14–18 (7–11 MAAC)
- Head coach: Chuck Martin (4th season)
- Assistant coaches: Will Lanier; Paul Lee
- Home arena: McCann Arena

2011–12 MAAC men's basketball standings
	Conf.				Overall
Team	W		L	PCT	W		L	PCT
Iona	15	–	3	.833	25	–	8	.758
Loyola (MD) †	13	–	5	.722	24	–	9	.727
Manhattan	12	–	6	.667	21	–	13	.618
Fairfield	12	–	6	.667	22	–	15	.595
Rider	10	–	8	.556	13	–	19	.406
Siena	8	–	10	.444	14	–	17	.452
Niagara	8	–	10	.444	14	–	19	.424
Marist	7	–	11	.389	14	–	18	.438
Saint Peter's	4	–	14	.222	5	–	26	.161
Canisius	1	–	17	.056	5	–	25	.167
† 2012 MAAC tournament winner Rankings from AP Poll

The 2011–12 Marist Red Foxes men's basketball team represented Marist College during the 2010–11 NCAA Division I men's basketball season. The Red Foxes, led by fourth year head coach Chuck Martin, played their home games at the McCann Arena and were members of the Metro Atlantic Athletic Conference. They finished the season 14–18, 7–11 in MAAC play to finish eighth place. They lost in the quarterfinals of the MAAC tournament to Iona.

== Previous season ==
The Red Foxes finished the 2010–11 season 6–27, 3–15 in MAAC play to finish in a tie for the ninth place. They advanced to the quarterfinals of the MAAC tournament where they lost to Fairfield.

== Roster ==
2011–12 Marist Red Foxes men's basketball team
Players
Coaches

Pos.	#	Name	Height	Weight	Year	Previous school	Hometown
G	0	Devin Price	6 ft 1 in (1.85 m)	170 lb (77 kg)	Jr	St. Bernard Catholic (CA)	Inglewood, California
G/F	1	Dorvell Carter	6 ft 6 in (1.98 m)	200 lb (91 kg)	RS Jr	Rice (NY)	Bronx, New York
G	5	R.J. Hall	5 ft 10 in (1.78 m)	165 lb (75 kg)	Sr	Bloomfield Tech	East Orange, New Jersey
G	11	Isaiah Morton	5 ft 8 in (1.73 m)	170 lb (77 kg)	Fr	St. Augustine Prep	Vineland, New Jersey
G	13	Rob Delle Bovi (W)	6 ft 0 in (1.83 m)	165 lb (75 kg)	So	Pleasantville	Briarcliff Manor, New York
G	14	Jesse Martin (W)	6 ft 2 in (1.88 m)	180 lb (82 kg)	Jr	Wilde Lake	Columbia, Maryland
F	15	Anell Alexis	6 ft 6 in (1.98 m)	185 lb (84 kg)	So	St. Benedict's Prep	Hillsborough, New Jersey
G/F	20	Jay Bowie	6 ft 5 in (1.96 m)	210 lb (95 kg)	So	Tampa Prep	Tampa, Florida
G	21	Tourron Whitfield (W)	6 ft 2 in (1.88 m)	170 lb (77 kg)	Fr	Archbishop Molloy	Valley Stream, New York
G/F	24	Manny Thomas	6 ft 5 in (1.96 m)	190 lb (86 kg)	Fr	Xaverian	Brooklyn, New York
G	32	T.J. Curry	6 ft 1 in (1.85 m)	190 lb (86 kg)	Fr	Christ the King	Brooklyn, New York
F	34	Pieter Prinsloo	6 ft 10 in (2.08 m)	225 lb (102 kg)	So	Dover (DE)	Johannesburg, South Africa
G/F	40	Chavaughn Lewis	6 ft 5 in (1.96 m)	185 lb (84 kg)	Fr	St. Mary's (Manhasset, NY)	Queens, New York
F	50	Adam Kemp	6 ft 10 in (2.08 m)	235 lb (107 kg)	So	Winchendon (MA)	Sherrill, New York

Head coach

- Chuck Martin (Monmouth, 4th yr., 1993)

Assistant coach(es)

- Paul Lee (Columbia, 4th yr., 1986)
- Will Lanier (Georgia Tech, 4th yr., 2004)

Legend

- (C) Team captain
- (S) Suspended
- (I) Ineligible
- (W) Walk-on
- Injured
- Current redshirt

Roster
Last update: 2019-02-10

== Schedule and results ==
Date time, TV	Rank^{#}	Opponent^{#}	Result	Record	Site (attendance) city, state
Regular season
Nov 11, 2011*; 7:00 p.m., ESPN3		at No. 2 Kentucky; Hall of Fame Tip Off	L 58–108	0–1	Rupp Arena (22,079); Lexington, KY
Nov 14, 2011*; 7:00 p.m., ESPN3		at South Florida; Hall of Fame Tip off	L 67–81	0–2	St. Pete Times Forum (2,465); Tampa, FL
Nov 19, 2011*; 6:00 p.m.		vs. Vermont; Hall of Fame Tip off	L 75–84	0–3	Mohegan Sun Arena (1,504); Uncasville, CT
Nov 20, 2011*; 7:30 p.m.		vs. Radford; Hall of Fame Tip off	W 60–47	1–3	Mohegan Sun Arena; Uncasville, CT
Nov 22, 2011*; 7:00 p.m.		Bucknell	L 68–74	1–4	McCann Arena (1,168); Poughkeepsie, NY
Nov 26, 2011*; 7:00 p.m.		Colgate	W 81–73	2–4	McCann Arena (1,304); Poughkeepsie, NY
Dec 1, 2011; 7:30 p.m.		at Loyola (Md)	L 63–76	2–5 (0–1)	Reitz Arena (1,201); Baltimore, MD
Dec 4, 2011; 2:00 p.m.		Rider	W 95–75	3–5 (1–1)	McCann Arena (1,272); Poughkeepsie, NY
Dec 7, 2011*; 7:00 p.m.		Army	W 59–56	4–5	McCann Arena (1,366); Poughkeepsie, NY
Dec 17, 2011*; 1:00 p.m.		at New Hampshire	L 56–73	4–6	Lundholm Gym (669); Durham, NH
Dec 21, 2011*; 7:00 p.m.		Hartford	W 89–86 ^{2OT}	5–6	McCann Arena (910); Poughkeepsie, NY
Dec 23, 2011*; 7:00 p.m.		at Penn	L 71–84	5–7	The Palestra (2,513); Philadelphia, PA
Dec 28, 2011*; 7:00 p.m.		Columbia	W 79–59	6–7	McCann Arena (1,454); Poughkeepsie, NY
Jan 2, 2012; 7:00 p.m.		Saint Peter's	W 71–67	7–7 (2–1)	McCann Arena (1,031); Poughkeepsie, NY
Jan 6, 2012; 7:05 p.m.		at Rider	L 86–99	7–8 (2–2)	Alumni Gymnasium (1,545); Lawrenceville, NJ
Jan 8, 2012; 2:00 p.m.		Iona	L 76–100	7–9 (2–3)	McCann Arena (1,313); Poughkeepsie, NY
Jan 13, 2012; 7:05 p.m.		at Canisius	L 57–67	7–10 (2–4)	Koessler Center (820); Buffalo, NY
Jan 15, 2012; 2:00 p.m.		at Niagara	L 67–86	7–11 (2–5)	Gallagher Center (1,133); Lewiston, NY
Jan 20, 2012; 9:00 p.m., ESPN3		Manhattan	L 44–61	7–12 (2–6)	McCann Arena (1,229); Poughkeepsie, NY
Jan 27, 2012; 7:00 p.m.		at Siena	L 55–66	7–13 (2–7)	Times Union Center (7,906); Albany, NY
Jan 29, 2012; 1:00 p.m.		at Fairfield	L 53–81	7–14 (2–8)	Webster Bank Arena (2,070); Bridgeport, CT
Feb 2, 2012; 8:00 p.m.		at Manhattan	L 51–73	7–15 (2–9)	Draddy Gymnasium (1,988); Riverdale, NY
Feb 4, 2012; 7:00 p.m.		Canisius	W 80–69	8–15 (3–9)	McCann Arena (1,477); Poughkeepsie, NY
Feb 9, 2012; 8:30 p.m., ESPN3		at Saint Peter's	W 66–47	9–15 (4–9)	Yanitelli Center (1,247); Jersey City, NJ
Feb 12, 2012; 7:00 p.m.		at Iona	L 74–83	9–16 (4–10)	Hynes Athletic Center (2,260); New Rochelle, NY
Feb 15, 2012; 7:00 p.m.		Loyola (MD)	W 72–54	10–16 (5–10)	McCann Arena (1,151); Poughkeepsie, NY
Feb 18, 2012*; 2:00 p.m.		at Maine; ESPN BracketBusters	W 77–71	11–16	Memorial Gymnasium (1,203); Orono, ME
Feb 20, 2012; 7:00 p.m.		Fairfield	L 49–60	11–17 (5–11)	McCann Arena (1,306); Poughkeepsie, NY
Feb 23, 2012; 9:00 p.m., ESPN3		Siena	W 61–52	12–17 (6–11)	McCann Arena (1,670); Poughkeepsie, NY
Feb 26, 2012; 2:00 p.m.		Niagara	W 89–77	13–17 (7–11)	McCann Arena (1,724); Poughkeepsie, NY
MAAC tournament
Mar 2, 2012; 7:30 p.m.	(8)	vs. (9) Saint Peter's; First Round	W 64–57	14–17	MassMutual Center; Springfield, MA
Mar 3, 2012; 4:30 p.m., ESPN3	(8)	vs. (1) Iona; Quarterfinals	L 63–87	14–18	MassMutual Center (2,256); Springfield, MA
*Non-conference game. ^{#}Rankings from AP Poll. (#) Tournament seedings in parentheses. All times are in Eastern Time.
