= 2011–12 Manhattan Jaspers basketball team =

American college basketball season

2011–12 Manhattan Jaspers basketball

CIT, Second Round
- Conference: Metro Atlantic Athletic Conference
- Record: 21–13 (12–6 MAAC)
- Head coach: Steve Masiello (1st season)
- Assistant coaches: Matt Grady; Scott Padgett; Rashon Burno
- Home arena: Draddy Gymnasium

2011–12 MAAC men's basketball standings
	Conf.				Overall
Team	W		L	PCT	W		L	PCT
Iona	15	–	3	.833	25	–	8	.758
Loyola (MD) †	13	–	5	.722	24	–	9	.727
Manhattan	12	–	6	.667	21	–	13	.618
Fairfield	12	–	6	.667	22	–	15	.595
Rider	10	–	8	.556	13	–	19	.406
Siena	8	–	10	.444	14	–	17	.452
Niagara	8	–	10	.444	14	–	19	.424
Marist	7	–	11	.389	14	–	18	.438
Saint Peter's	4	–	14	.222	5	–	26	.161
Canisius	1	–	17	.056	5	–	25	.167
† 2012 MAAC tournament winner Rankings from AP Poll

The 2011–12 Manhattan Jaspers basketball team represented Manhattan College during the 2011–12 NCAA Division I men's basketball season. The Jaspers, led by first year head coach Steve Masiello, played their home games at Draddy Gymnasium and are members of the Metro Atlantic Athletic Conference. They finished the season 21–13, 12–6 in MAAC play to finish in a tie for third place. They lost in the quarterfinals of the MAAC Basketball tournament to Siena. They were invited to the 2012 CollegeInsider.com Tournament where they defeated Albany in the first round before falling in the second round to fellow MAAC member Fairfield.

== Roster ==
2011–12 Manhattan Jaspers men's basketball team
#	Name	Position	Height	Weight	Year	Hometown
1	DeCarlos Anderson	Guard	6–1	180	Freshman	Portsmouth, Virginia
4	Chris Viven	Guard	5–10	185	Junior	New York City, New York
5	Mohamed Koita	Guard	6–4	195	Junior	Cergy, France
10	Ryan McCoy	Forward	6–8	185	Freshman	Skillman, New Jersey
12	RaShawn Stores	Guard	5–11	195	Freshman	The Bronx, New York
13	Emmy Andujar	Forward	6–5	205	Freshman	The Bronx, New York
14	Torgrim Sommerfeldt	Forward	6–6	200	Sophomore	Drammen, Norway
20	Liam McCabe-Moran	Guard	6–4	190	Senior	New Rochelle, New York
21	Djibril Coulibaly	Center	6–9	200	Senior	Bamako, Mali
22	Roberto Colonette	Forward	6–7	210	Senior	Queens, New York
24	George Beamon	Guard/Forward	6–4	170	Junior	Roslyn, New York
31	Michael Alvarado	Guard	6–2	185	Sophomore	The Bronx, New York
32	Rhamel Brown	Forward/Center	6–6	215	Sophomore	Brooklyn, New York
33	Donovan Kates	Guard	6–6	200	Freshman	Hopkinsville, Kentucky
41	Kevin Laue	Center	6–11	230	Junior	Pleasanton, California
50	Kidani Brutus	Guard	6–1	200	Senior	The Bronx, New York

== Schedule ==
Date time, TV	Rank^{#}	Opponent^{#}	Result	Record	Site (attendance) city, state
Exhibition
11/05/2011*; 5:30 pm		Adelphi	W 74–68		Draddy Gymnasium (748); Riverdale, NY
Regular season
11/12/2011*; 2:00 pm		NJIT	W 62–48	1–0	Draddy Gymnasium (1,406); Riverdale, NY
11/14/2011*; 7:00 pm, ESPNU		at No. 5 Syracuse; NIT Season Tip-Off	L 56–92	1–1	Carrier Dome (17,284); Syracuse, NY
11/15/2011*; 4:00 pm		vs. Brown; NIT Season Tip-Off	W 54–52	2–1	Carrier Dome (NA); Syracuse, NY
11/21/2011*; 7:00 pm		vs. Fresno State; NIT Season Tip-Off	W 85–83	3–1	Moby Arena (NA); Fort Collins, CO
11/22/2011*; 9:30 pm		at Colorado State; NIT Season Tip-Off	L 86–91 ^{OT}	3–2	Moby Arena (890); Fort Collins, CO
11/26/2011*; 2:00 pm		Columbia	W 59–41	3–3	Draddy Gymnasium (1,138); Riverdale, NY
11/29/2011*; 7:00 pm		at Penn	L 72–75	3–4	The Palestra (1,938); Philadelphia, PA
12/02/2011; 7:00 pm		at Rider	W 71–55	4–4 (1–0)	Alumni Gymnasium (1,602); Lawrenceville, NJ
12/04/2011; 2:00 pm		Saint Peter's	W 68–42	5–4 (2–0)	Draddy Gymnasium (738); Riverdale, NY
12/07/2011*; 7:00 pm		Fordham; Battle of the Bronx	W 81–47	6–4	Draddy Gymnasium (2,345); Riverdale, NY
12/10/2011*; 4:00 pm		at Hofstra	W 68–59	7–4	Hofstra Arena (2,852); Hempstead, NY
12/20/2011*; 7:00 pm		at Towson	W 81–62	8–4	Towson Center (778); Towson, MD
12/23/2011*; 7:00 pm		at George Mason	L 61–81	8–5	Patriot Center (4,014); Fairfax, VA
12/30/2011*; 7:00 pm		at Binghamton	W 94–51	9–5	Binghamton University Events Center (2,131); Binghamton, NY
01/02/2012; 7:00 pm		Rider	L 77–88	9–6 (2–1)	Draddy Gymnasium (1,234); Riverdale, NY
01/05/2012; 7:30 pm		at Loyola (MD)	L 60–61	9–7 (2–2)	Reitz Arena (811); Baltimore, MD
01/08/2012; 2:00 pm		Fairfield	W 53–51	10–7 (3–2)	Draddy Gymnasium (1,358); Riverdale, NY
01/12/2012; 7:00 pm		at Iona	W 75–72	11–7 (4–2)	Hynes Athletic Center (2,060); New Rochelle, NY
01/14/2012; 7:00 pm, ESPN3		Siena	W 72–53	12–7 (5–2)	Draddy Gymnasium (1,276); Riverdale, NY
01/20/2012; 9:00 pm, ESPN3		at Marist	W 61–44	13–7 (6–2)	McCann Field House (1,229); Poughkeepsie, NY
01/22/2012; 4:00 pm		Niagara	W 71–64	14–7 (7–2)	Draddy Gymnasium (1,428); Riverdale, NY
01/27/2012; 7:15 pm		at Canisius	W 78–66	15–7 (8–2)	Koessler Athletic Center (1,498); Buffalo, NY
01/29/2012; 4:00 pm		at Niagara	W 87–70	16–7 (9–2)	Gallagher Center (1,625); Lewiston, NY
02/02/2012; 8:00 pm, ESPN3		Marist	W 73–51	17–7 (10–2)	Draddy Gymnasium (1,988); Riverdale, NY
02/04/2012; 7:00 pm, ESPN3		Iona	L 73–85	17–8 (10–3)	Draddy Gymnasium (2,345); Riverdale, NY
02/09/2012; 7:30 pm		at Fairfield	L 54–60	17–9 (10–4)	Webster Bank Arena (1,445); Bridgeport, CT
02/11/2012; 2:00 pm		at Saint Peter's	W 85–63	18–9 (11–4)	Yanitelli Center (793); Jersey City, NJ
02/14/2012; 7:00 pm		at Siena	L 64–70	18–10 (11–5)	Times Union Center (5,812); Albany, NY
02/18/2012*; 2:00 pm		UNC Wilmington; ESPN BracketBusters	W 79–64	19–10	Draddy Gymnasium (1,388); Riverdale, NY
02/24/2012; 7:00 pm		Canisius	W 90–77	20–10 (12–5)	Draddy Gymnasium (1,510); Riverdale, NY
02/26/2012; 4:00 pm		Loyola (MD)	L 60–62	20–11 (12–6)	Draddy Gymnasium (2,345); Riverdale, NY
MAAC tournament
03/03/2012; 9:30 pm, ESPN3		vs. Siena; Quarterfinals	L 82–84 ^{OT}	20–12	MassMutual Center (2,124); Springfield, MA
2012 College Insider tournament
03/14/2012*; 7:00 pm		at Albany; First Round	W 89–79	21–12	SEFCU Arena (458); Albany, NY
03/18/2012*; 4:00 pm		at Fairfield; Second Round	L 57–69	21–13	Alumni Hall (1,492); Fairfield, CT
*Non-conference game. ^{#}Rankings from AP Poll. (#) Tournament seedings in parentheses. All times are in Eastern Time.
