= 2004 MAAC men's basketball tournament =

- Classification: Division I
- Season: 2003–04
- Teams: 10
- Site: Pepsi Arena; Albany, New York
- Champions: Manhattan (3rd title)
- Winning coach: Bobby Gonzalez (2nd title)
- MVP: Luis Flores (Manhattan)

2003–04 MAAC men's basketball standings
	Conf.				Overall
Team	W		L	PCT	W		L	PCT
Manhattan †	16	–	2	.889	25	–	6	.806
Niagara	13	–	5	.722	22	–	10	.688
Fairfield	12	–	6	.667	19	–	11	.633
Saint Peter's	12	–	6	.667	17	–	12	.586
Rider	10	–	8	.556	17	–	14	.548
Siena	9	–	9	.500	14	–	16	.467
Iona	8	–	10	.444	11	–	18	.379
Canisius	5	–	13	.278	10	–	20	.333
Marist	4	–	14	.222	6	–	22	.214
Loyola (MD)	1	–	17	.056	1	–	27	.036
† 2004 MAAC tournament winner

The 2004 MAAC men's basketball tournament was held March 5–8 at Pepsi Arena in Albany, New York.

Top-seeded Manhattan defeated Niagara in the championship game, 62–61, to win their third MAAC men's basketball tournament.

The Jaspers received an automatic bid to the 2004 NCAA tournament.

== Format ==
All ten of the conference's members participated in the tournament field. They were seeded based on regular season conference records.

As the regular-season champion, top seed Manhattan received a bye to the semifinals.

== Bracket ==
First round Friday, March 5
March 5
(5) Rider	75
(10) Loyola (MD)	67
March 5
(7) Iona	68
(8) Canisius	66
March 5
(6) Siena	73
(9) Marist	64

Quarterfinals; Saturday, March 6
March 6
(4) Saint Peter's	79
(5) Rider	69
March 6
(2) Niagara	106
(7) Iona	92
March 6
(3) Fairfield	63
(6) Siena	66

Semifinals; Sunday, March 7
March 7
(1) Manhattan	83
(4) Saint Peter's	72
March 7
(2) Niagara	79
(6) Siena	74

Final; Monday, March 8
March 8
(1) Manhattan	62
(2) Niagara	61
