= Bobby Gonzalez =

American basketball coach

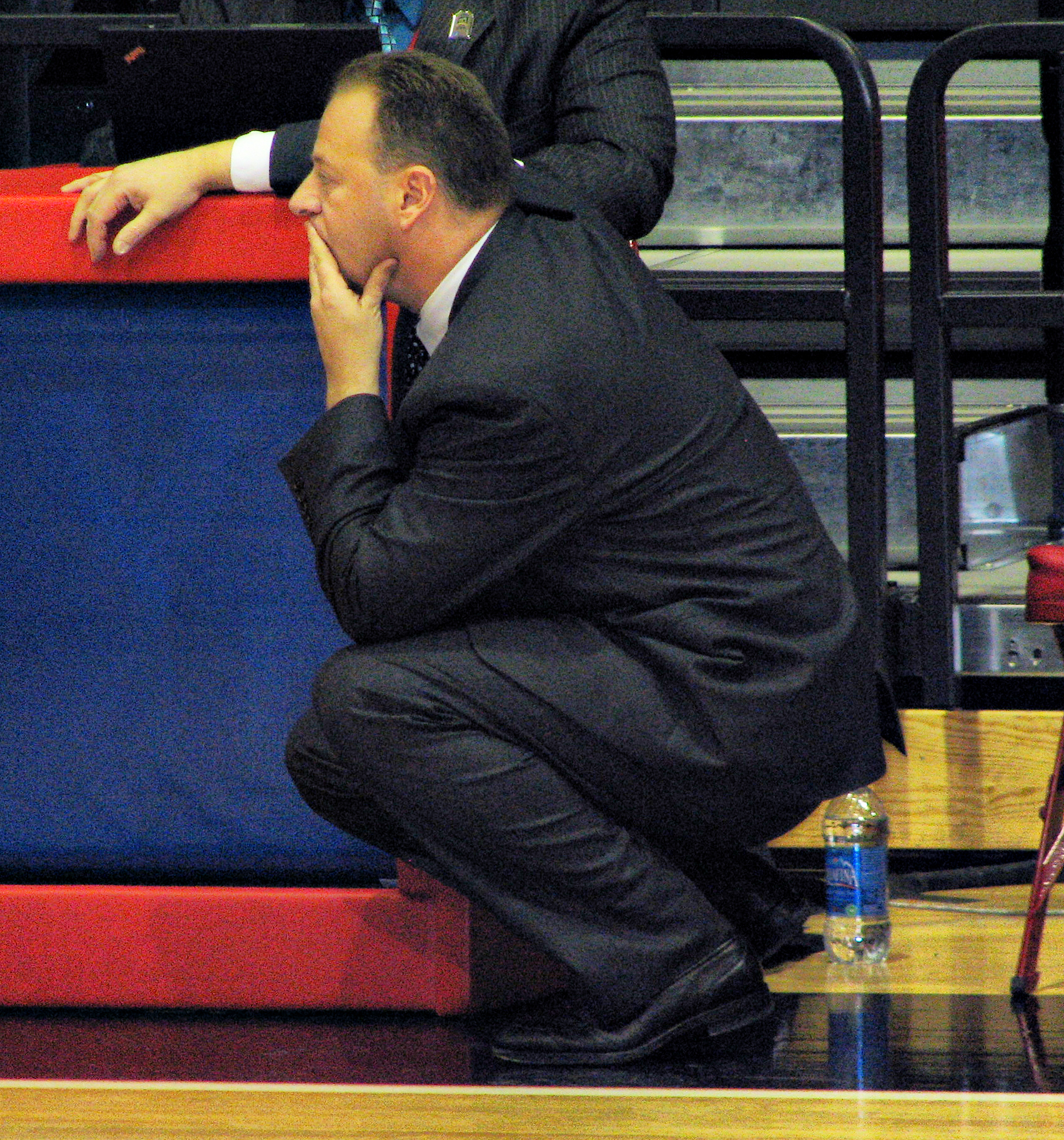
- Gonzalez in 2009

Current position
- Title: Assistant coach
- Team: Mississippi Valley State
- Conference: SWAC

Biographical details
- Born: March 18, 1963 (age 63); Binghamton, New York, U.S.
- Education: Buffalo State University (1986)

Playing career
- 1982–1986: Buffalo State
- Position: Point guard

Coaching career (HC unless noted)
- 1987–1988: Binghamton (asst.)
- 1988–1991: St. Nicholas of Tolentine HS (asst.)
- 1992–1993: Rice HS (asst.)
- 1993–1994: Xavier (asst.)
- 1994–1998: Providence (asst.)
- 1998–1999: Virginia (asst.)
- 1999–2006: Manhattan
- 2006–2010: Seton Hall
- 2020–2021: BC Nevėžis (asst.)
- 2026–present: Mississippi Valley State (asst.)

Head coaching record
- Overall: 195–136
- Tournaments: 1–2 (NCAA Division I); 2–3 (NIT)

Accomplishments and honors

Championships
- 2 MAAC tournament (2003, 2004); 3 MAAC regular season (2003, 2004, 2006)

Awards
- 2× MAAC Coach of the Year (2003, 2006)

Robert P. Gonzalez (born March 18, 1963) is an American basketball coach who is currently an assistant coach for the Mississippi Valley State Delta Devils of the Southwestern Athletic Conference.

Gonzalez was previously a scout for the Detroit Pistons, and head coach at Manhattan College and Seton Hall University. Gonzalez had previously been an assistant under Pete Gillen at Xavier, Providence and Virginia, serving as one of Gillen's top recruiters.

== Early life and education ==
A native of Binghamton, New York, Gonzalez graduated from Buffalo State College in 1986.

== Coaching career ==
=== Early coaching career (1986–1999) ===
Gonzalez began his career as an assistant at Broome Community College in the 1986–87 season then moved up to the NCAA Division I level as an assistant at Binghamton in 1987–88. From 1988 to 1991, Gonzalez was an assistant at St. Nicholas of Tolentine High School in The Bronx and coached AAU teams as well. In the 1992–93 school year, Gonzalez was head coach at Rice High School in Manhattan.

Gonzalez later was an assistant under Pete Gillen for six seasons, first at Xavier in the 1993–94 season, then at Providence from 1994 to 1998, and finally at Virginia in the 1998–99 season.

=== Manhattan (1999–2006) ===
Gonzalez had a career record of 129–77 in seven seasons at Manhattan, including two trips to the NCAA tournament. He took the 12th-seeded Jaspers to the second round of the 2004 NCAA tournament after the team defeated five seed Florida Gators in the first round; the program's second ever NCAA Tournament win.

=== Seton Hall (2006–2010) ===
Gonzalez was hired by Seton Hall in April 2006, largely because of his recruiting pedigree and his ties to high school coaches in New York City, which is 14 miles east of Seton Hall's campus.

Gonzalez's first season ended with a 13–16 record overall, and a 4–12 record in the Big East. Seton Hall finished 13th out of 16 in the Big East and missed the Big East tournament for the first time ever.

Gonzalez's second season was more successful. The Pirates finished the regular season with 7 Big East wins and 17 wins overall. They qualified for the Big East tournament for the first time under Gonzalez as the 11 seed against 6 seed Marquette. The Pirates missed out on an NIT bid and rejected an invitation to the inaugural College Basketball Invitational.

The 2008–09 season saw the Pirates notch an identical record to the previous year. As the 11th seed in the 2009 Big East men's basketball tournament, they defeated 14th-seed South Florida 68–54 for their first win in the conference tournament in six years. However, they lost the next day to Syracuse, 89–74. School officials rewarded with Gonzalez a contract extension that would have kept him at Seton Hall until 2015.

The following year, Gonzalez led the Pirates to postseason play for the first time in four years, with a berth in the NIT. Six minutes into the Pirates' first-round matchup with Texas Tech, forward Herb Pope knocked Texas Tech's Darko Cohadarevic to the floor with a punch to the groin. After officials reviewed the play on the replay monitor, Pope was ejected from the game, and Seton Hall subsequently lost 87–69.

Seton Hall fired Gonzalez the following day. According to The Star-Ledger, Seton Hall University School of Law dean Patrick Hobbs, who oversaw the athletic department at the time, recommended Gonzalez's firing on the weekend before the NIT. In a statement released after Gonzalez' ouster, Hobbs said that Seton Hall had "core expectations" for how coaches and players conduct themselves. Seton Hall president Monsignor Robert Sheeran made the final decision to fire Gonzalez, saying that he no longer had confidence in Gonzalez' "ability to coach and to lead." He added that "athletics never exist to besmirch the university in any way." School officials were displeased with Gonzalez's behavior—specifically, his tendency to berate Seton Hall administrators, opposing coaches, opposing players and referees. They were also concerned about several incidents involving Seton Hall players.

A month after his firing, Gonzalez sued Seton Hall for wrongful termination, seeking to be paid for the last two years of his contract. The suit was settled in August 2010; terms were not disclosed.

=== After Seton Hall (2010–present) ===
After he was fired by Seton Hall, Gonzalez served as a scout for NBA teams, motivational speaker, basketball analyst on TV and radio, and consultant.

Gonzalez was the assistant coach of BC Nevėžis of Lithuanian Basketball League for the 2020-21 season.

In 2021, Gonzalez joined the Detroit Pistons as a scout.

In 2026, Gonzalez was named an assistant coach under new Mississippi Valley State head coach Mike Davis.

=== USA Basketball ===
Gonzalez was an assistant coach with the 2005 USA Basketball World University Games Team that won a gold medal in Turkey. He was also a court coach for the 2002 USA Junior National Team Trials.

== Hall of Fame ==
In 2023, Gonzalez was inducted into the Greater Binghamton (New York) Athletic Hall of Fame.

In 2026, Gonzalez was inducted into both the New York State Basketball Hall of Fame as well as the Manhattan University athletics Hall of Fame.

== Head coaching record ==
Record table
Season	Team	Overall	Conference	Standing	Postseason
Manhattan Jaspers (Metro Atlantic Athletic Conference) (1999–2006)
1999–2000	Manhattan	12–15	9–9	6th	
2000–01	Manhattan	14–15	11–7	6th	
2001–02	Manhattan	20–9	12–6	3rd	NIT First Round
2002–03	Manhattan	23–7	14–4	1st	NCAA Division I First Round
2003–04	Manhattan	25–6	16–2	1st	NCAA Division I Second Round
2004–05	Manhattan	15–14	9–9	5th	
2005–06	Manhattan	20–11	14–4	1st	NIT Second Round
Manhattan:		129–77 (.626)	85–41 (.675)		
Seton Hall Pirates (Big East Conference) (2006–2010)
2006–07	Seton Hall	13–16	4–12	13th	
2007–08	Seton Hall	17–15	7–11	11th	
2008–09	Seton Hall	17–15	7–11	11th	
2009–10	Seton Hall	19–13	9–9	10th	NIT First Round
Seton Hall:		66–59 (.528)	27–43 (.386)		
Total:		195–136 (.589)			
National champion Postseason invitational champion Conference regular season champion Conference regular season and conference tournament champion Division regular season champion Division regular season and conference tournament champion Conference tournament champion
