= 2011–12 Fairfield Stags men's basketball team =

American college basketball season

2011–12 Fairfield Stags men's basketball
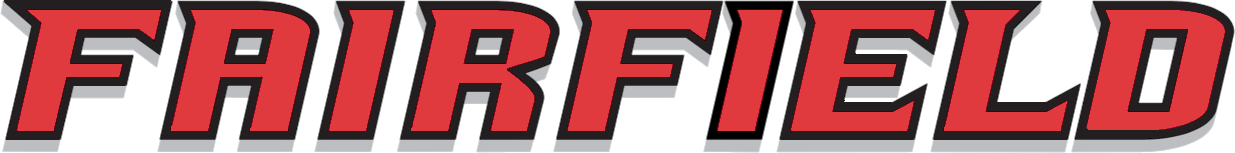

CIT, Semifinals
- Conference: Metro Atlantic Athletic Conference
- Record: 22–15 (12–6 MAAC)
- Head coach: Sydney Johnson (1st season)
- Assistant coaches: Tony Newsom; Brian Nash; Tyson Wheeler
- Home arena: Webster Bank Arena; Alumni Hall

2011–12 MAAC men's basketball standings
	Conf.				Overall
Team	W		L	PCT	W		L	PCT
Iona	15	–	3	.833	25	–	8	.758
Loyola (MD) †	13	–	5	.722	24	–	9	.727
Manhattan	12	–	6	.667	21	–	13	.618
Fairfield	12	–	6	.667	22	–	15	.595
Rider	10	–	8	.556	13	–	19	.406
Siena	8	–	10	.444	14	–	17	.452
Niagara	8	–	10	.444	14	–	19	.424
Marist	7	–	11	.389	14	–	18	.438
Saint Peter's	4	–	14	.222	5	–	26	.161
Canisius	1	–	17	.056	5	–	25	.167
† 2012 MAAC tournament winner Rankings from AP Poll

The 2011–12 Fairfield Stags men's basketball team represented Fairfield University during the 2011–12 NCAA Division I men's basketball season. The Stags, led by first year head coach Sydney Johnson, played their home games at Webster Bank Arena, with games during the CIT played at Alumni Hall, and are members of the Metro Atlantic Athletic Conference. They finished the season 22–15, 12–6 in MAAC play to finish in a tie for third place. They lost in the championship game of the MAAC Basketball tournament to Loyola (MD). They were invited to the 2012 CollegeInsider.com Tournament where they defeated Yale, Manhattan, and Robert Morris en route to the semifinals where they fell to Mercer.

== Roster ==
Number	Name	Position	Height	Weight	Year	Hometown
3	Derek Needham	Guard	5–11	180	Junior	Dolton, Illinois
5	Adam Jones	Forward	6–8	210	Freshman	Winter Park, Florida
11	Desmond Wade	Guard	5–8	150	Junior	Linden, New Jersey
12	Sean Crawford	Guard	5–10	150	Junior	Laurelton, New York
13	Gary Martin	Guard	6–2	180	Senior	Cleveland, Ohio
15	Maurice Barrow	Forward	6–5	210	Sophomore	St. Albans, New York
21	Rakim Sanders	Guard/Forward	6–5	228	Senior	Pawtucket, Rhode Island
23	Jamel Fields	Guard	6–1	175	Sophomore	Albany, New York
25	Colin Nickerson	Guard	6–3	150	Junior	Waukegan, Illinois
33	Vincent Van Nes	Forward	7–0	230	Freshman	Dorchester, England
34	Ryan Olander	Forward	7–0	220	Senior	Mansfield, Connecticut
41	Keith Matthews	Forward	6–5	200	Sophomore	Sebastian, Florida
	Keegan Hyland	Guard	6–3	180	Sophomore	Portland, Maine

== Schedule ==
Date time, TV	Rank^{#}	Opponent^{#}	Result	Record	Site (attendance) city, state
Exhibition
November 4, 2011*; 7:30 pm		Bridgeport	W 97–70	—	Webster Bank Arena (1,467); Bridgeport, CT
Regular season
November 11, 2011*; 5:30 pm		vs. Quinnipiac; Connecticut 6 Classic	W 72–60	1–0	Mohegan Sun Arena (1,406); Uncasville, CT
November 14, 2011*; 7:30 pm, Cox Sports		Providence	L 72–80	1–1	Webster Bank Arena (6,375); Bridgeport, CT
November 17, 2011*; 7:00 pm, BTN		at Minnesota	L 57–67	1–2	Williams Arena (10,641); Minneapolis, MN
November 20, 2011*; 1:00 pm		Holy Cross	W 73–52	2–2	Webster Bank Arena (2,479); Bridgeport, CT
November 24, 2011*; 9:30 pm, ESPN2		vs. Arizona State; Old Spice Classic First Round	W 55–44	3–2	HP Field House (3,537); Lake Buena Vista, FL
November 25, 2011*; 5:00 pm, ESPN2		vs. Dayton; Old Spice Classic Semifinals	L 49–56	3–3	HP Field House (3,680); Lake Buena Vista, FL
November 27, 2011*; 4:30 pm, ESPN2		vs. Indiana State; Old Spice Classic 3rd Place Game	L 66–72	3–4	HP Field House (NA); Lake Buena Vista, FL
December 2, 2011; 7:00 pm		at Niagara	W 78–75	4–4 (1–0)	Gallagher Center (1,520); Lewiston, NY
December 4, 2011; 5:00 pm		at Canisius	W 68–59	5–4 (2–0)	Koessler Athletic Center (1,011); Buffalo, NY
December 9, 2011*; 9:00 pm, SNY		vs. Old Dominion	W 59–51	6–4	MassMutual Center (4,412); Springfield, MA
December 11, 2011*; 1:00 pm		New Hampshire	W 58–52	7–4	Webster Bank Arena (1,926); Bridgeport, CT
December 22, 2011*; 7:00 pm		at No. 9 Connecticut	L 71–79	7–5	XL Center (13,821); Hartford, CT
December 28, 2011*; 7:00 pm		at Drexel	L 69–77	7–6	Daskalakis Athletic Center (2,469); Philadelphia, PA
January 1, 2012; 1:00 pm		Canisius	W 72–54	8–6 (3–0)	Webster Bank Arena (2,005); Bridgeport, CT
January 6, 2012; 7:00 pm, SNY		at Siena	L 60–73	8–7 (3–1)	Times Union Center (6,765); Albany, NY
January 8, 2012; 2:00 pm		at Manhattan	L 51–53	8–8 (3–2)	Draddy Gymnasium (1,358); Riverdale, NY
January 13, 2012; 2:00 pm, ESPNU		Loyola (MD)	L 63–66	8–9 (3–3)	Webster Bank Arena (2,012); Bridgeport, CT
January 16, 2012; 7:30 pm		Rider	W 61–52	9–9 (4–3)	Webster Bank Arena (1,937); Bridgeport, CT
January 19, 2012; 7:00 pm		at Saint Peter's	W 75–63	10–9 (5–3)	Yanitelli Center (1,146); Jersey City, NJ
January 22, 2012; 2:00 pm		at Marist	Rescheduled due to inclement weather		McCann Field House; Poughkeepsie, NY
January 27, 2012; 7:00 pm, ESPNU		Iona	L 62–71	10–10 (5–4)	Webster Bank Arena (4,055); Bridgeport, CT
January 29, 2012; 1:00 pm		Marist	W 81–53	11–10 (6–4)	Webster Bank Arena (2,070); Bridgeport, CT
February 3, 2012; 7:30 pm		Niagara	W 77–69	12–10 (7–4)	Webster Bank Arena (2,118); Bridgeport, CT
February 5, 2012; 3:30 pm, SNY		Siena	W 64–56	13–10 (8–4)	Webster Bank Arena (1,477); Bridgeport, CT
February 9, 2012; 7:30 pm		Manhattan	W 60–54	14–10 (9–4)	Webster Bank Arena (1,445); Bridgeport, CT
February 12, 2012; 4:00 pm, ESPN3		at Loyola (MD)	W 68–51	15–10 (10–4)	Reitz Arena (1,925); Baltimore, MD
February 15, 2012; 7:30 pm		Saint Peter's	W 61–38	16–10 (11–4)	Webster Bank Arena (1,729); Bridgeport, CT
February 18, 2012*; 4:00 pm		at Milwaukee; ESPN BracketBusters	L 63–67	16–11	U.S. Cellular Arena (5,683); Milwaukee, WI
February 20, 2012; 7:00 pm		at Marist; Rescheduled from 1/22/2012	W 60–49	17–11 (12–4)	McCann Field House (1,306); Poughkeepsie, NY
February 24, 2012; 9:00 pm, ESPNU		at Iona	L 72–77	17–12 (12–5)	Hynes Athletic Center (2,611); New Rochelle, NY
February 26, 2012; 3:30 pm, ESPN3		at Rider	L 62–65	17–13 (12–6)	Alumni Gymnasium (1,650); Lawrenceville, NJ
MAAC tournament
March 3, 2012; 2:30 pm, ESPN3	(4)	vs. (5) Rider; Quarterfinals	W 65–63	18–13	MassMutual Center (2,256); Springfield, MA
March 4, 2012; 2:00 pm, ESPN3	(4)	vs. (1) Iona; Semifinals	W 85–75	19–13	MassMutual Center (2,778); Springfield, MA
March 5, 2012; 7:00 pm, ESPN2	(4)	vs. (2) Loyola (MD); Championship Game	L 44–48	19–14	MassMutual Center (1,821); Springfield, MA
CollegeInsider.com tournament
March 14, 2012*; 7:00 pm		Yale; First Round	W 68–56	20–14	Webster Bank Arena (1,744); Bridgeport, CT
March 18, 2012*; 4:00 pm		Manhattan; Second Round	W 69–57	21–14	Alumni Hall (1,492); Fairfield, CT
March 21, 2012*; 7:00 pm		Robert Morris; Quarterfinals	W 67–61	22–14	Alumni Hall (1,407); Fairfield, CT
March 24, 2012*; 7:00 pm		Mercer; Semifinals	L 59–64	22–15	Alumni Hall (1,557); Fairfield, CT
*Non-conference game. ^{#}Rankings from AP Poll. (#) Tournament seedings in parentheses. All times are in Eastern Time.
