= Jimmy Patsos =

American college basketball coach (born 1966)

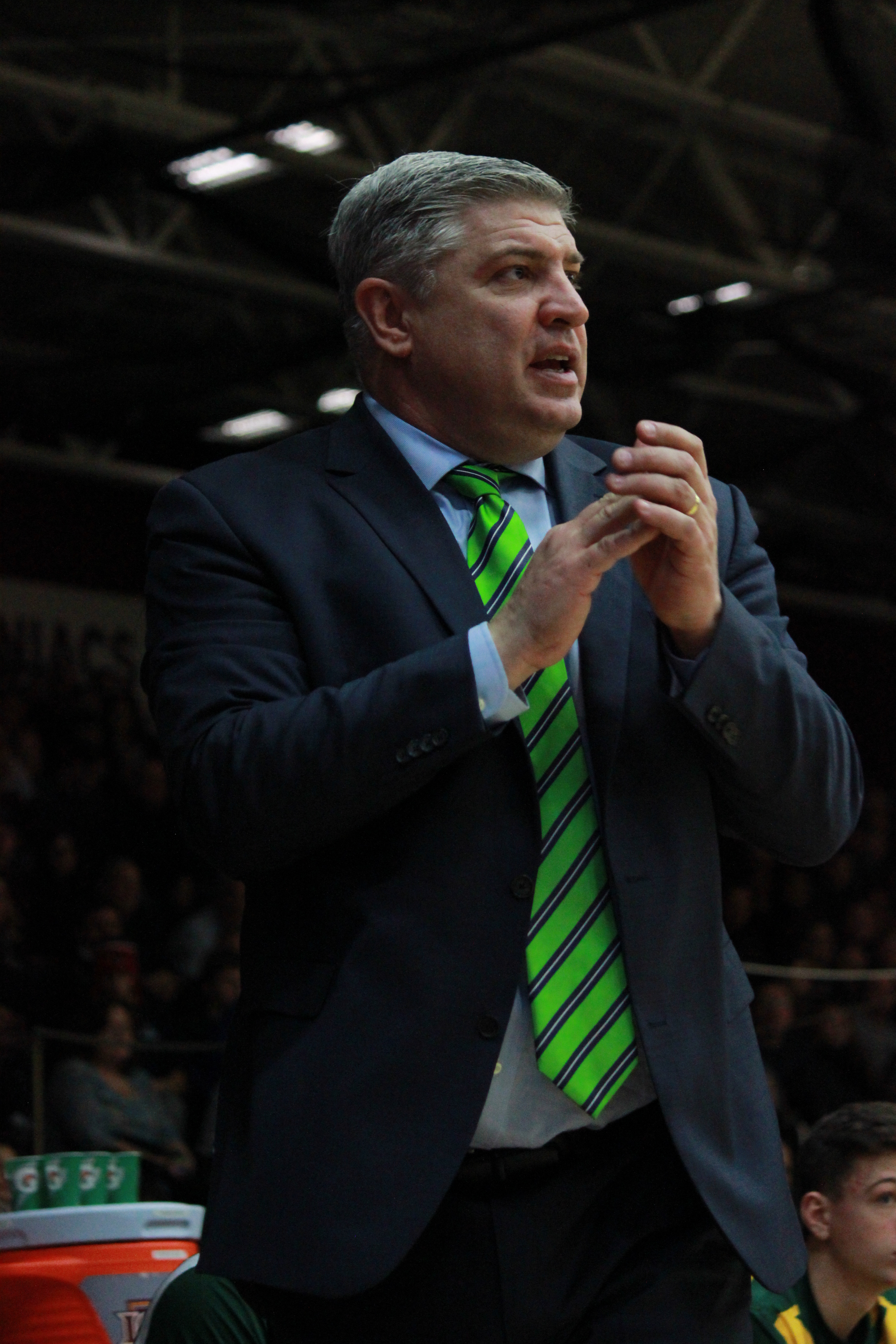

Biographical details
- Born: October 1, 1966 (age 60); Boston, Massachusetts, U.S.

Playing career
- 1986–1989: Catholic

Coaching career (HC unless noted)
- 1989–1991: Archbishop Carroll HS (assistant)
- 1991–2004: Maryland (assistant)
- 2004–2013: Loyola (MD)
- 2013–2018: Siena

Head coaching record
- Overall: 222–227

Accomplishments and honors

Championships
- CBI (2014); MAAC tournament (2012)

Awards
- MAAC Coach of the Year (2012); Skip Prosser Man of the Year Award (2012)

James John Patsos (born October 1, 1966) is an American sports commentator and former college basketball coach. He served as an assistant coach, then head coach at Loyola (MD) and Siena, and is now a commentator and broadcaster.

He currently serves as the color commentator for Towson and George Washington men's basketball games.

Patsos earned his B.A. from Catholic University in 1989. There, he played basketball under Jack Bruen, who later coached Colgate University to a couple of NCAA tournament appearances in the 1990s.

== Early career ==
Patsos served on the coaching staff of Gary Williams at the University of Maryland for 13 years, beginning as a volunteer assistant in 1991. Patsos took over at Loyola after they suffered a 1–27 season under former coach Scott Hicks.

Patsos was the 20th head coach of Loyola men's basketball. In his first season as coach in 2004, he guided them to a 6–22 record. In his second season, they reached 15–13, the first time they had a winning record since the 1993–94 season, the year they reached the NCAA Tournament under Skip Prosser.

On Dec. 22, 2009 a Patsos led Loyola team recorded the greatest regular season win in program history by defeating the Indiana Hoosiers 72–67. The Hounds led by as many as 22, before the Hoosiers rallied to take a late lead. Senior guard Brett Harvey led the Hounds back scoring 9 points in the final 3 minutes.

Patsos has guided the Greyhounds to multiple 3rd place MAAC finishes, finishing with 18 wins in 2006–07 and a tied a school record with 19 wins in 2007–08.

Patsos has sought local talent in his coaching staff. Former players from Maryland, Terrell Stokes and Matt Kovarik are former assistants at Loyola.

A former member of his staff at Loyola was current Loyola Head Coach G.G. Smith, the son of college basketball coach Tubby Smith

Patsos received a contract extension from Loyola on July 9, 2008. Per Loyola policies, details of the contract were not released.

On November 25, 2008, Patsos and the Greyhounds double-teamed Davidson All-American and future NBA All-Star Stephen Curry for the entire game, leaving his other three players to face the 24th ranked Wildcats in a four on three game. Davidson won by 30, while Curry stood in the corner during most possessions. Commenting afterwards, Patsos said: "We had to play against an NBA player tonight. Anybody else ever hold him scoreless? I'm a history major. They're going to remember that we held him scoreless or we lost by 30? I know the fans are mad at me, but I had to roll the dice as far as a coach goes. I'm not some rookie coach," said Patsos, a former longtime assistant at Maryland. "I won a national title as a top assistant coach to Gary Williams. For 13 years I spent on Tobacco Road. I coached a couple of No. 1 picks in the draft. And we scored 48 points. That's the problem that Loyola basketball had today." (implying that his team's offense cost them the game, not their defense).

=== Siena Saints ===
After nine seasons at Loyola, Patsos agreed to replace Mitch Buonaguro in a similar capacity at Siena on April 2, 2013.

==== 2013-2018 ====
On November 19, 2013 Patsos recorded his first win at Siena in a 72–70 triumph over St. Bonaventure.

In his first season at the helm, Patsos guided the Saints to their first winning season since 2010 as the program capped off a 20-18 year which ended in a CBI championship. The title was the program's second ever national postseason championship (1950 National Catholic Invitational). After starting the season 7-12, Siena finished the regular season strongly with an 11-9 conference record and fifth-place finish before losing in the MAAC Quarterfinals to Canisius 71-65.

The Saints were selected to play in College Basketball Invitational. Siena defeated Stony Brook 66-55 in the first round. The Saints then won a thriller beating Penn State from the Big Ten Conference 54-52 in the Quarterfinals. After a 61-49 win over Illinois State in the semifinals; Siena defeated Fresno State in the best-of-three CBI championship series. Siena won game one on the road 61-57 after rallying from 12 down in the second half. The Bulldogs would tie the series before the Saints would clinch the title with an 81-68 victory in game three. Siena finished the season winning nine of their final 11 games.

On April 13, 2018 Patsos resigned from Siena after 5 years with a 77-92 career record after the college opened an investigation into allegations of inappropriate behavior in the program.

== Broadcasting career ==
Since Siena, Patsos has worked as a broadcaster and commentator, discussing Washington Mystics and Washington Wizards NBA games, and as a color commentator for Towson and George Washington.

== Head coaching record ==
Record table
Season	Team	Overall	Conference	Standing	Postseason
Loyola Greyhounds (Metro Atlantic Athletic Conference) (2004–2013)
2004–05	Loyola	6–22	5–13	9th	
2005–06	Loyola	15–13	8–10	6th	
2006–07	Loyola	18–13	12–6	T–3rd	
2007–08	Loyola	19–14	12–6	T–3rd	
2008–09	Loyola	12–20	7–11	T–7th	
2009–10	Loyola	13–17	6–12	8th	
2010–11	Loyola	15–15	10–8	5th	
2011–12	Loyola	24–9	13–5	2nd	NCAA Division I Round of 64
2012–13	Loyola	23–12	12–6	T–2nd	CIT Quarterfinal
Loyola:		145–135 (.518)	85–77 (.525)		
Siena Saints (Metro Atlantic Athletic Conference) (2013–2018)
2013–14	Siena	20–18	11–9	5th	CBI champion
2014–15	Siena	11–20	7–13	T–8th	
2015–16	Siena	21–13	13–7	3rd	CBI First Round
2016–17	Siena	17–17	12–8	T–3rd	
2017–18	Siena	8–24	4–14	T–10th	
Siena:		77–92 (.456)	47–51 (.480)		
Total:		222–227 (.494)			
National champion Postseason invitational champion Conference regular season champion Conference regular season and conference tournament champion Division regular season champion Division regular season and conference tournament champion Conference tournament champion

== Controversies ==
On November 19, 2008 Jimmy Patsos became one of the only coaches ever to coach from the stands during his team's game in an attempt to avoid being ejected by the referees.

On November 25, 2008 Patsos was roundly criticized for appearing to prefer holding Davidson player Stephen Curry scoreless over winning the basketball game by double-teaming Curry while he stood in the corner while Davidson played 4 on 3 against the remaining players. In his post-game press-conference, Patsos justified his strategy by stating that "We had to play against an NBA player tonight. Anybody else ever hold him scoreless? I’m a history major. They’re going to remember that we held him scoreless or we lost by 30?"

On January 17, 2017 after a brawl in a game vs Rider, the Broncs and their head coach, Kevin Baggett, decided not to shake hands with Patsos and his team at the end of the game. In response, Patsos walked down the line where he would've shaken the Rider team and staffs and, decided to air shake their hands. In response, Patsos and Baggett both received a reprimand from the NCAA. Siena won the league game 78-68.
