= 2012 MAAC men's basketball tournament =

- Classification: Division I
- Season: 2011–12
- Teams: 10
- Site: MassMutual Center; Springfield, MA
- Champions: Loyola (MD) (2nd title)
- Winning coach: Jimmy Patsos (1st title)
- MVP: Erik Etherly (Loyola (MD))
- Television: ESPN3, ESPN2

2011–12 MAAC men's basketball standings
	Conf.				Overall
Team	W		L	PCT	W		L	PCT
Iona	15	–	3	.833	25	–	8	.758
Loyola (MD) †	13	–	5	.722	24	–	9	.727
Manhattan	12	–	6	.667	21	–	13	.618
Fairfield	12	–	6	.667	22	–	15	.595
Rider	10	–	8	.556	13	–	19	.406
Siena	8	–	10	.444	14	–	17	.452
Niagara	8	–	10	.444	14	–	19	.424
Marist	7	–	11	.389	14	–	18	.438
Saint Peter's	4	–	14	.222	5	–	26	.161
Canisius	1	–	17	.056	5	–	25	.167
† 2012 MAAC tournament winner Rankings from AP Poll

The 2012 Metro Atlantic Athletic Conference men's basketball tournament took place from March 2–5, 2012 at the MassMutual Center in Springfield, Massachusetts. The tournament was to be held in Springfield through 2014. The tournament was previously held at Webster Bank Arena in Bridgeport, Connecticut. Loyola (MD) defeated Fairfield 48–44 to clinch the title and a berth in the 2012 NCAA tournament. Loyola received a No. 15 seed and were defeated by No. 2 seed Ohio State 78–59.

Iona also received an at-large bid into the NCAA Tournament. They played in the No. 14 seed First Four game against BYU. BYU set a record for the largest comeback in an NCAA tournament game, as they were down by 25 points at one point and came back to beat Iona 78–72. The largest previous deficit overcome in the tournament was 22 points by Duke against Maryland in the 2001 national semifinals.

== Bracket ==
First round Friday, March 2
8	Marist	64
9	Saint Peter's	57
7	Niagara	80
10	Canisius	70

Quarterfinals; Saturday, March 3
1	Iona	87
8	Marist	63
4	Fairfield	65
5	Rider	63
2	Loyola (MD)	86
7	Niagara	73
3	Manhattan	82
6	Siena	84

Semifinals; Sunday, March 4
1	Iona	75
4	Fairfield	85
2	Loyola (MD)	70
6	Siena	60

Championship Game; Monday, March 5
4	Fairfield	44
2	Loyola (MD)	48
