= 2011–12 Loyola Greyhounds men's basketball team =

American college basketball season

2011–12 Loyola Greyhounds men's basketball

MAAC tournament champions

NCAA Tournament, Round of 64
- Conference: Metro Atlantic Athletic Conference
- Record: 24–9 (13–5 MAAC)
- Head coach: Jimmy Patsos (8th season)
- Assistant coaches: G.G. Smith; Greg Manning; Luke D'Alessio
- Home arena: Reitz Arena

2011–12 MAAC men's basketball standings
	Conf.				Overall
Team	W		L	PCT	W		L	PCT
Iona	15	–	3	.833	25	–	8	.758
Loyola (MD) †	13	–	5	.722	24	–	9	.727
Manhattan	12	–	6	.667	21	–	13	.618
Fairfield	12	–	6	.667	22	–	15	.595
Rider	10	–	8	.556	13	–	19	.406
Siena	8	–	10	.444	14	–	17	.452
Niagara	8	–	10	.444	14	–	19	.424
Marist	7	–	11	.389	14	–	18	.438
Saint Peter's	4	–	14	.222	5	–	26	.161
Canisius	1	–	17	.056	5	–	25	.167
† 2012 MAAC tournament winner Rankings from AP Poll

The 2011–12 Loyola Greyhounds men's basketball team represented Loyola University Maryland during the 2011–12 NCAA Division I men's basketball season. The Greyhounds, led by eighth year head coach Jimmy Patsos, played their home games at Reitz Arena and are members of the Metro Atlantic Athletic Conference. They finished the season 24–9, 13–5 in MAAC play to finish in second place. They were champions of the MAAC Basketball tournament and earned the conference's automatic bid into the 2012 NCAA tournament where they lost in the first round to Ohio State.

== Roster ==
Number	Name	Position	Height	Weight	Year	Hometown
1	Anthony Winbush	Forward	6–7	194	Junior	Alexandria, Virginia
2	Justin Drummond	Guard	6–4	187	Sophomore	Bowie, Maryland
3	Dylon Cormier	Guard	6–2	172	Sophomore	Baltimore, Maryland
5	Shane Walker	Forward	6–10	225	Senior	Northampton, England
10	J'hared Hall	Guard	6–2	180	Senior	Mount Vernon, New York
12	R.J. Williams	Guard	5–8	155	Freshman	Baltimore, Maryland
15	Jordan Letham	Forward	6–8	249	Sophomore	Baltimore, Maryland
20	Pierson Williams	Guard	6–3	184	Sophomore	Sylmar, California
23	Tyler Hubbard	Guard	6–1	165	Freshman	Mitchellville, Maryland
24	Erik Etherly	Forward	6–7	225	Junior	Annandale, Virginia
25	Robert Olson	Guard	6–4	189	Junior	Silver Spring, Maryland
30	Julius Brooks	Forward	6–9	224	Junior	Greensboro, North Carolina
33	Luke Wandrusch	Guard	6–1	186	Junior	Rockville Center, New York
35	Chido Onyiuke	Forward	6–6	198	Sophomore	Mount Arlington, New Jersey

== Schedule ==
Date time, TV	Rank^{#}	Opponent^{#}	Result	Record	Site (attendance) city, state
Exhibition
11/03/2011*; 7:30 pm		Indiana (PA)	W 83–71		Reitz Arena (471); Baltimore, MD
Regular season
11/11/2011*; 7:00 pm, ESPN3		at Wake Forest	L 63–75	0–1	LJVM Coliseum (6,022); Winston-Salem, NC
11/14/2011*; 7:30 pm		Coppin State	W 78–68	1–1	Reitz Arena (1,031); Baltimore, MD
11/17/2011*; 7:00 pm, MASN		UMBC	W 73–63	2–1	Reitz Arena (1,790); Baltimore, MD
11/20/2011*; 1:00 pm		at New Hampshire	W 66–60	3–1	Lundholm Gym (696); Durham, NH
11/27/2011*; 12:00 pm		Florida Gulf Coast	W 77–74	4–1	Reitz Arena (882); Baltimore, MD
12/01/2011; 7:30 pm		Marist	W 76–63	5–1 (1–0)	Reitz Arena (1,201); Baltimore, MD
12/03/2011; 7:00 pm		at Siena	W 66–59	6–1 (2–0)	Times Union Center (6,447); Albany, NY
12/07/2011*; 7:00 pm, MASN		at George Washington	W 65–55	7–1	Charles E. Smith Athletic Center (2,356); Washington, D.C.
12/10/2011*; 2:00 pm, MASN		at Mount St. Mary's	W 65–54	8–1	Knott Arena (1,620); Emmitsburg, MD
12/18/2011*; 2:30 pm		at St. Bonaventure	L 66–76	8–2	Reilly Center (3,095); St. Bonaventure, NY
12/22/2011*; 1:00 pm, MASN/FS South		at No. 3 Kentucky	L 63–87	8–3	Rupp Arena (22,774); Lexington, KY
12/28/2011*; 7:00 pm		at Bucknell	W 72–67	9–3	Sojka Pavilion (3,348); Lewisburg, PA
01/02/2012; 7:30 pm		Niagara	L 61–66	9–4 (2–1)	Reitz Arena (946); Baltimore, MD
01/05/2012; 7:30 pm		Manhattan	W 61–60	10–4 (3–1)	Reitz Arena (811); Baltimore, MD
01/07/2012; 12:00 pm		Canisius	W 77–62	11–4 (4–1)	Reitz Arena (539); Baltimore, MD
01/13/2012; 9:00 pm		at Fairfield	W 66–63	12–4 (5–1)	Webster Bank Arena (1,313); Bridgeport, CT
01/15/2012; 3:30 pm		at Iona	L 63–74	12–5 (5–2)	Hynes Athletic Center (2,060); New Rochelle, NY
01/19/2012; 7:30 pm		Siena	W 74–63	13–5 (6–2)	Reitz Arena (1,393); Baltimore, MD
01/22/2012; 12:00 pm		Saint Peter's	W 65–54	14–5 (7–2)	Reitz Arena (634); Baltimore, MD
01/27/2012; 7:00 pm		at Niagara	W 69–57	15–5 (8–2)	Gallagher Center (1,626); Lewiston, NY
01/29/2012; 2:15 pm		at Canisius	W 70–52	16–5 (9–2)	Koessler Athletic Center (1,254); Buffalo, NY
02/03/2012; 7:00 pm, ESPNU		Rider	W 63–46	17–5 (10–2)	Reitz Arena (2,100); Baltimore, MD
02/05/2012; 2:00 pm		at Saint Peter's	W 66–55	18–5 (11–2)	Yanitelli Center (578); Jersey City, NJ
02/10/2012; 7:00 pm, ESPNU		Iona	W 87–81	19–5 (12–2)	Reitz Arena (2,100); Baltimore, MD
02/12/2012; 4:00 pm, ESPN3		Fairfield	L 51–68	19–6 (12–3)	Reitz Arena (1,925); Baltimore, MD
02/15/2012; 7:00 pm		at Marist	L 54–72	19–7 (12–4)	McCann Field House (1,151); Poughkeepsie, NY
02/19/2012*; 12:00 pm		Boston University; ESPN BracketBusters	W 69–56	20–7	Reitz Arena (1,283); Baltimore, MD
02/24/2012; 7:00 pm, ESPN2		at Rider	L 79–83	20–8 (12–5)	Alumni Gymnasium (1,650); Lawrenceville, NJ
02/26/2012; 4:00 pm		at Manhattan	W 62–60	21–8 (13–5)	Draddy Gymnasium (2,345); Riverdale, NY
2012 MAAC men's basketball tournament
03/03/2012; 7:30 pm, ESPN3		vs. Niagara; Quarterfinals	W 86–73	22–8	MassMutual Center (2,124); Springfield, MA
03/04/2012; 4:30 pm, ESPN3		vs. Siena; Semifinals	W 70–60	23–8	MassMutual Center (2,778); Springfield, MA
03/05/2012; 7:00 pm, ESPN2		vs. Fairfield; Championship Game	W 48–44	24–8	MassMutual Center (1,821); Springfield, MA
2012 NCAA tournament
03/15/2012*; 9:50 pm, TNT	No. (E 15)	vs. No. 7 (E 2) Ohio State; First Round	L 59–78	24–9	Consol Energy Center (19,413); Pittsburgh, PA
*Non-conference game. ^{#}Rankings from AP Poll. (#) Tournament seedings in parentheses. All times are in Eastern Time (#) during NCAA Tournament is seed with Region.
