= 2002–03 Manhattan Jaspers basketball team =

American college basketball season

2002–03 Manhattan Jaspers basketball

MAAC Regular season champions MAAC Tournament champions

NCAA tournament, first round
- Conference: Metro Atlantic Athletic Conference
- Record: 23–7 (14–4 MAAC)
- Head coach: Bobby Gonzalez (4th season)
- Home arena: Draddy Gymnasium

2002–03 MAAC men's basketball standings
	Conf.				Overall
Team	W		L	PCT	W		L	PCT
Manhattan †	14	–	4	.778	23	–	7	.767
Fairfield	13	–	5	.722	19	–	12	.613
Siena	12	–	6	.667	21	–	11	.656
Niagara	12	–	6	.667	17	–	12	.586
Iona	11	–	7	.611	17	–	12	.586
Marist	8	–	10	.444	13	–	16	.448
Rider	7	–	11	.389	12	–	16	.429
Saint Peter's	6	–	12	.333	10	–	19	.345
Canisius	6	–	12	.333	10	–	18	.357
Loyola (MD)	1	–	17	.056	4	–	24	.143
† 2003 MAAC tournament winner

The 2002–03 Manhattan Jaspers basketball team represented Manhattan College during the 2002–03 NCAA Division I men's basketball season. The Jaspers, led by head coach Bobby Gonzalez, played their home games at Draddy Gymnasium and were members of the Metro Atlantic Athletic Conference. They finished the season 23–7, 14–4 in MAAC play to win the league regular season title. They were champions of the MAAC tournament to earn an automatic bid to the NCAA tournament. Playing as the No. 14 seed in the East region, Manhattan fell to No. 3 seed and eventual National champion Syracuse, 76–65 in the opening round.

== Roster ==
2002–03 Manhattan Jaspers men's basketball team
Players	Coaches
Pos. / # / Name / Height / Weight / Year / Hometown; G / 3 / Luis Flores / 6 ft 2 in (1.88 m) / 200 lb (91 kg) / Jr / San Pedro de Macorís, Dominican Republic	Head coach: Bobby Gonzalez; Assistant coach(es) Legend: (C) Team captain; (S) Suspended; (I) Ineligible; (W) Walk-on; Injured; Current redshirt

== Schedule and results ==
Date time, TV	Rank^{#}	Opponent^{#}	Result	Record	Site (attendance) city, state
Regular season
Dec 18, 2002*		at Louisville	L 62–89	4–2	Freedom Hall; Louisville, Kentucky
MAAC tournament
Mar 9, 2003*		vs. Niagara; Semifinals	W 82–81 ^{2OT}	22–6	Sun National Bank Center; Trenton, New Jersey
Mar 10, 2003*		vs. Fairfield; Championship game	W 69–54	23–6	Sun National Bank Center; Trenton, New Jersey
NCAA tournament
Mar 21, 2003*; CBS	(14 E)	vs. (3 E) No. 13 Syracuse; First round	L 65–76	23–7	FleetCenter (18,141); Boston, Massachusetts
*Non-conference game. ^{#}Rankings from AP Poll, (#) during NCAA Tournament is seed within region E=East. (#) Tournament seedings in parentheses. All times are in Eastern Time.
