= Bill Campion =

American basketball player (born 1952)

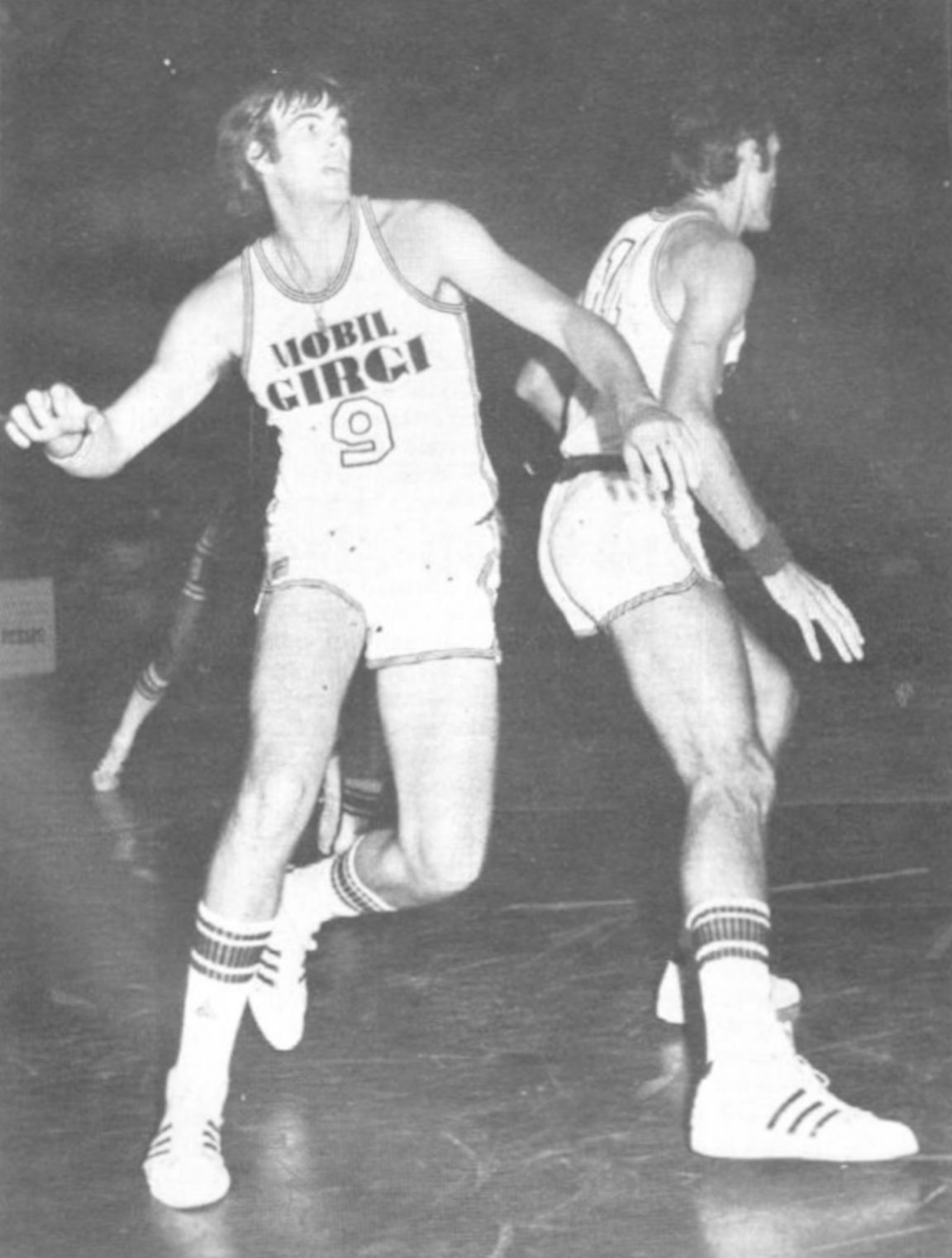
- Campion playing for Mobilgirgi Varese in 1975

Personal information
- Born: 1952 (age 73–74) The Bronx, New York, U.S.
- Listed height: 6 ft 9 in (2.06 m)
- Listed weight: 235 lb (107 kg)

Career information
- High school: Rice (New York City, New York)
- College: Manhattan (1972–1975)
- NBA draft: 1975: 4th round, 60th overall pick
- Drafted by: Milwaukee Bucks
- Position: Center

Career history
- 1975–1976: Mobilgirgi Varese

Career highlights
- Haggerty Award winner (1974)
- Stats at Basketball Reference

William Campion (born 1952) is a retired American basketball player. He stands 6 ft 9 in (2.06 m) and played the center position in college and professionally. Campion is best known for his career at Manhattan College. Before graduating in 1975, in just over 2½ seasons, he set the still-standing school rebounds records for a game (30), season (419), and career (1,070). He also scored 1,223 points to give him a 1,000-point/rebound mark for his career. After his junior season he was given the Haggerty Award, an annual award that goes to the best male collegiate basketball player in the greater New York City area. Campion was selected in the fourth round (60th overall) in the 1975 NBA draft by the Milwaukee Bucks. The American Basketball Association's Virginia Squires also chose him that year, but Campion did not play in either league.

After Manhattan College, Campion played in Italy for Mobilgirgi Varese. During his rookie season, his team won the Euroleague championship, 81–74, over Real Madrid. In the title game, he played 29 minutes and recorded seven points, five rebounds and two assists. Eventually Campion moved back to the United States and played for the Washington Generals, the traveling exhibition team that plays the Harlem Globetrotters. As a member of the Generals for eight years, he was on a team that defeated the Globetrotters in 1984. Since the Globetrotters always defeat the Generals, the loss left the audience of the game in shock.

Campion has not played competitive basketball since 1990 due to the wear and tear of playing seven or more games per week for eight years. He has had both knees replaced because of it. Today he resides in Altoona, Pennsylvania.

In 1986, he was selected for the Manhattan College Athletic Hall of Fame.
