= 2003–04 Manhattan Jaspers basketball team =

American college basketball season

2003–04 Manhattan Jaspers basketball

MAAC Regular season champions MAAC Tournament champions

NCAA tournament, second round
- Conference: Metro Atlantic Athletic Conference
- Record: 25–6 (16–2 MAAC)
- Head coach: Bobby Gonzalez (5th season)
- Home arena: Draddy Gymnasium

2003–04 MAAC men's basketball standings
	Conf.				Overall
Team	W		L	PCT	W		L	PCT
Manhattan †	16	–	2	.889	25	–	6	.806
Niagara	13	–	5	.722	22	–	10	.688
Fairfield	12	–	6	.667	19	–	11	.633
Saint Peter's	12	–	6	.667	17	–	12	.586
Rider	10	–	8	.556	17	–	14	.548
Siena	9	–	9	.500	14	–	16	.467
Iona	8	–	10	.444	11	–	18	.379
Canisius	5	–	13	.278	10	–	20	.333
Marist	4	–	14	.222	6	–	22	.214
Loyola (MD)	1	–	17	.056	1	–	27	.036
† 2004 MAAC tournament winner

The 2003–04 Manhattan Jaspers basketball team represented Manhattan College during the 2003–04 NCAA Division I men's basketball season. The Jaspers, led by head coach Bobby Gonzalez, played their home games at Draddy Gymnasium and were members of the Metro Atlantic Athletic Conference. They finished the season 25–6, 16–2 in MAAC play to win the league regular season title. They were champions of the MAAC tournament to earn an automatic bid to the NCAA tournament. Playing as the No. 12 seed in the East Rutherford region, Manhattan upset No. 5 seed Florida in the opening round before pushing No. 4 seed Wake Forest to the brink before falling, 84–80.

== Roster ==
2003–04 Manhattan Jaspers men's basketball team
Players	Coaches
Pos. / # / Name / Height / Weight / Year / Hometown; G / 3 / Luis Flores / 6 ft 2 in (1.88 m) / 200 lb (91 kg) / Sr / San Pedro de Macorís, Dominican Republic	Head coach: Bobby Gonzalez; Assistant coach(es) Legend: (C) Team captain; (S) Suspended; (I) Ineligible; (W) Walk-on; Injured; Current redshirt

== Schedule and results ==
Date time, TV	Rank^{#}	Opponent^{#}	Result	Record	Site (attendance) city, state
Regular season
Dec 17, 2003*		at No. 19 Syracuse	L 63–69	3–2	Carrier Dome; Syracuse, New York
MAAC tournament
Mar 7, 2004*		vs. Saint Peter's; Semifinals	W 83–72	23–5	Times Union Center; Albany, New York
Mar 8, 2004*		vs. Niagara; Championship game	W 62–61	24–5	Times Union Center; Albany, New York
NCAA tournament
Mar 18, 2004*	(12 ATL)	vs. (5 ATL) Florida; First Round	W 75–60	25–5	RBC Center; Raleigh, North Carolina
Mar 20, 2004*	(12 ATL)	vs. (4 ATL) No. 17 Wake Forest; Second Round	L 80–84	25–6	RBC Center; Raleigh, North Carolina
*Non-conference game. ^{#}Rankings from AP Poll, (#) during NCAA Tournament is seed within region MW=Midwest. (#) Tournament seedings in parentheses. All times are in Eastern Time.
