= Emmanuel Andújar =

Puerto Rican basketball player

No. 2 – Capitanes de Arecibo
- Position: Small forward
- League: BSN

Personal information
- Born: January 27, 1993 (age 33) New York City, NY, U.S.
- Listed height: 6 ft 6 in (1.98 m)
- Listed weight: 205 lb (93 kg)

Career information
- High school: Rice (New York City, NY)
- College: Manhattan College (2011–2015)
- NBA draft: 2015: undrafted
- Playing career: 2015–present

Career history
- 2015–2016: Força Lleida CE
- 2016–2017: Palencia Baloncesto
- 2017–2018: Capitanes de Ciudad de México
- 2018–2020: Santeros de Aguada
- 2020–2022: Cariduros de Fajardo
- 2022–2023: Real Estelí
- 2023–2024: Cariduros de Fajardo
- 2025–present: Capitanes de Arecibo

Career highlights
- BSN champion (2019); Third-team All-America East (2015); America East Defensive Player of the Year (2015); 2× America East All-Defensive Team (2014, 2015)

Emmanuel "Emmy" Andújar (born January 27, 1992) is an American-Puerto Rican basketball for the Capitanes de Arecibo of the Baloncesto Superior Nacional (BSN). He also represents Puerto Rico internationally. Earlier, Andújar played college basketball for the Manhattan Jaspers.

== Early life ==
Andújar played four years at Rice High School and helped guide the Raiders to the 2011 CHSAA class AA championship game. As a senior he averaged 12.3 points, 7.8 rebounds and 3.9 assists per game and was named to the All-CHSAA Second Team. He was also selected to the New York Daily News All-Manhattan Second Team.

== College career ==
(2011–2012) As a freshman, Andújar averaged 8.5 points per game. He was selected to the MAAC All-Rookie team. As a sophomore, he played all 29 games. He averaged 7.8 points per game and 5.0 rebounds per game. As a junior, he averaged 8.6 points per game and 5.3 rebounds per game. He was selected to the MAAC All-Tournament team. As a senior, he started 31 of 32 games, making a jump across the board in production. He averaged 16.3 points per game, 7.6 rebounds per game, and 3.5 assists per game, earning a spot on the MAAC First team. He also earned All-MET and All-Tournament honors in the postseason.

== Professional career ==
Andujar began his professional career in the Liga Española de Baloncesto (Spain) with ICG Forca Leída. In 28 games, he averaged 10.7 points per game, 6.3 rebounds per game and 2.1 assists per game.

He played in Puerto Rico with Atenienses de Manatí for five games and then with Santeros de Aguada for the next three seasons. In 2019, he won the BSN championship. In 2021, the team was moved to Fajardo. With Cariduros de Fajardo, he averaged 13.8 points per game, 6.5 rebounds per game, and 2.9 assists per game in 30 games.

== National Team career ==
Andújar first represented Puerto Rico in U18. In the summer of 2021, he was selected to represent the men's senior team in the trials in Belgrade, Serbia to advance to Tokyo, Japan for the 2021 Olympics.

== Personal life ==
In 2018, Andújar was diagnosed with cancer. Eighteen months later, he returned to basketball to play for Puerto Rico in the aforementioned Pan-Am games.

Andújar is the son José Andújar and Migdalia Ortiz. He has three brothers; Franklin, Christopher and José. He lost his older brother, José, while he was a freshman in college. He graduated with a degree in communications.
