= List of Le Moyne Dolphins men's basketball seasons =

List of college basketball team seasons

The men's basketball team of Le Moyne College is referred to as the Le Moyne Dolphins, and they play in Division I of the National Collegiate Athletic Association (NCAA) in the Northeast Conference (NEC). The Dolphins have played their home games on Ted Grant Court at the Le Moyne Events Center in DeWitt, New York since 1962.

The Dolphins played their first basketball game at home on December 7, 1948, a 41–39 loss to Siena. Le Moyne's first victory came on the road at Hobart in the Dolphins' second game.

In 1950, Le Moyne became a charter member of the Eastern Catholic Intercollegiate Athletic Conference (ECIAC). After only one season, the ECIAC ceased publicizing itself as a conference and became an association of its member schools with no basketball champion crowned, leaving Le Moyne an independent again for 1951–52.

In 1955, Le Moyne became a charter member of the new Middle Eastern College Athletic Association (MECAA). The MECAA included teams that were also members of other conferences, a practice not uncommon at the time. When the NCAA split its members into the College Division and University Division in 1956, the MECAA included four teams (St. Francis (NY), Iona, St. Bonaventure and Siena) that joined the University Division, while Le Moyne and Saint Peter's joined the College Division. St. Francis was also a member of the Metropolitan New York Conference, and St. Bonaventure was also a member of the Western New York Little Three Conference. Nevertheless, all six schools initially continued their affiliation with the MECAA after the split. Le Moyne remained a member of the MECAA, until it was dissolved following the 1975–76 season. The MECAA awarded its championship based on regular-season winning percentage and did not conduct a post-season tournament. The Dolphins took the title seven times during their 21 seasons of membership, the most championships of any conference member. Since conference membership crossed NCAA divisions, the MECAA champion was not awarded an automatic bid to any NCAA tournament. In December 1960, the MECAA conducted an in-season Christmas tournament that included five of its six teams as well as three non-members. Le Moyne defeated Saint Peter's, Iona and Long Island to win the tournament title.

Le Moyne became a Division II institution, when the College Division was split in 1973. Following the dissolution of the MECAA, the Dolphins played as an independent until joining the Mideast Collegiate Conference (MECC) in 1983, and remained a member of that conference until 1991. Le Moyne won two MECC regular-season titles and one conference tournament during their eight years in the league.

After playing the 1991–92 season as an independent, Le Moyne joined the New England Collegiate Conference (NECC) in 1992. The Dolphins won the NECC tournament in 1996, their final season in the league.

In 1996, the Dolphins joined the Northeast-10 Conference (NE10), where they remained until beginning reclassification to Division I as a member of the NEC in 2023. During their 26 seasons over a span of 27 years in the NE10 (the 2020–21 season was cancelled due to the COVID-19 pandemic), Le Moyne won three regular-season conference championships and two conference tournaments.

== Season results ==
Record table
Season	Coach	Overall	Conference	Standing	Postseason
Tommy Niland (Independent) (1948–1950)
1948–49	Tommy Niland	10–7 (Note: Excludes two wins over Cobleskill State on January 22 and March 5, 1949, which are included in Le Moyne's official records. Cobleskill State was a two-year college offering associate's degrees only at the time. Under the Bevo Francis rule, the NCAA only counts games against four-year institutions as collegiate contests.)			
1949–50	Tommy Niland	10–12			Utica Optimist Club champion
Tommy Niland (Eastern Catholic Intercollegiate Athletic Conference) (1950–1951)
1950–51	Tommy Niland	17–7	2–3	6th	National Catholic Invitational third place Utica Optimist Club champion
Tommy Niland (Independent) (1951–1955)
1951–52	Tommy Niland	8–15			National Catholic Invitational quarterfinalist Utica Optimist Club champion
1952–53	Tommy Niland	12–8			
1953–54	Tommy Niland	10–6			
1954–55	Tommy Niland	11–8			
Tommy Niland (Middle Eastern College Athletic Association) (1955–1973)
1955–56	Tommy Niland	15–6	4–2	T–2nd	
1956–57	Tommy Niland	10–9	3–4	4th	
1957–58	Tommy Niland	11–11	2–5	5th	
1958–59	Tommy Niland	18–6	4–1	T–1st (Note: Le Moyne finished tied with Iona. Le Moyne lost the only head-to-head matchup, 58–54, at Iona on February 14, 1959. Nevertheless, the MECAA recognized both teams as co-champions.)	NCAA College Division Sweet 16
1959–60	Tommy Niland	13–5	4–1	1st	NCAA College Division Regional fourth place
1960–61	Tommy Niland	16–7	2–2	3rd	1960 MECAA Invitational champion (played in season) (Note: Up until the 1959–60 season, uneven scheduling created controversy about which team deserved the league's championship in cases where the title had been decided in favor of a team that had scheduled one extra or one fewer game, since the conference awarded its championship to the team with the best winning percentage against conference opponents. In part to address this perceived inequity, the MECAA planned to stage this tournament annually in December to determine a champion with all conference teams on equal footing. The MECAA had five active full members at the time and invited three other teams (Fairleigh Dickinson, Long Island and Wagner) to create a full eight-team bracket and ensure the tournament champion would need to win three games. Despite the initial plans, the 1960 tournament was the only one the MECAA ever held. Starting with the 1961–62 season, MECAA teams played a single full round-robin schedule of games that counted in the league standings, and additional games between conference members were treated as non-conference contests. The 1960 tournament was unique, because it lacks characteristics of a conference tournament, since it was not held at the end of the season and included non-member teams. It also does not resemble an in-season multiple-team event, since all five active MECAA teams participated rather than limiting tournament entries to one team per conference.)
1961–62	Tommy Niland	13–9	4–1	1st	
1962–63	Tommy Niland	12–10	3–2	T–3rd	
1963–64	Tommy Niland	18–6	4–1	1st	NCAA College Division Sweet 16
1964–65	Tommy Niland	18–5	4–1	1st	NCAA College Division Regional fourth place
1965–66	Tommy Niland	16–6	4–1	2nd	NCAA College Division Regional fifth place
1966–67	Tommy Niland	11–10	1–4	6th	
1967–68	Tommy Niland	14–8	2–3	T–3rd	NCAA College Division Regional seventh place
1968–69	Tommy Niland	15–8	4–1	T–1st (Note: Le Moyne finished tied for first place with Saint Peter's and won the head-to-head matchup, 81–80, on December 3, 1968. Nevertheless, the MECAA recognized both teams as co-champions.)	NCAA College Division Regional fourth place
1969–70	Tommy Niland	11–10	2–2	3rd	
1970–71	Tommy Niland	9–12	2–3	4th	
1971–72	Tommy Niland	13–10	3–2	3rd	
1972–73	Tommy Niland	13–9	5–0	1st	
Tommy Niland (Pre-division NCAA):		93–69 (.574)	6–5 (.545)		
Tommy Niland (College Division):		231–141 (.621)	53–34 (.609)		
Tommy Niland:		324–210 (.607)	59–39 (.602)		
Tom Cooney (Middle Eastern College Athletic Association) (1973–1976)
1973–74	Tom Cooney	14–10	2–3	T–4th	
1974–75	Tom Cooney	14–11	2–3	T–3rd	
1975–76	Tom Cooney	12–12	1–4	6th	
Tom Cooney (Independent) (1976–1979)
1976–77	Tom Cooney	15–7			
1977–78	Tom Cooney	13–13			
1978–79	Tom Cooney	14–10			
Tom Cooney:		82–63 (.566)	5–10 (.333)		
Mike Lee (Independent) (1979–1983)
1979–80	Mike Lee	6–19			
1980–81	Mike Lee	5–21			
1981–82	Mike Lee	10–15			
1982–83	Mike Lee	13–12			
Mike Lee:		34–67 (.337)	–		
John Beilein (Mideast Collegiate Conference) (1983–1991)
1983–84	John Beilein	20–8	5–0	1st	
1984–85	John Beilein	19–10	4–6	T–4th (Note: Le Moyne finished tied for fourth place with Adelphi. The teams split their regular-season head-to-head matchups with Adelphi winning at home, 68–60, on January 26, 1985, and Le Moyne winning at home, 93–65, on February 9, 1985. Le Moyne was awarded the no. 4 seed in the conference tournament, based on a better overall record.)	
1985–86	John Beilein	14–15	4–6	4th	
1986–87	John Beilein	20–10	6–4	T–2nd (Note: Le Moyne finished tied for second place with Saint Michael's. The teams split their regular-season head-to-head matchups with Le Moyne winning at home, 87–81, on January 17, 1987, and Saint Michael's winning at home, 97–82, on February 7, 1987. Both teams were 0–2 versus first-place Gannon. Saint Michael's was awarded the no. 2 seed in the conference tournament, based on a 2–0 record versus fourth-place Pace, compared with the 1–1 record of Le Moyne, which was the no. 3 seed.)	
1987–88	John Beilein	24–6	8–2	T–1st (Note: Le Moyne finished tied for first place with Gannon and lost both regular-season head-to-head matchups, 87–85, in overtime at home on January 23, 1988, and 77–66, on the road on February 27, 1988. Both teams were recognized as regular-season co-champions. Gannon was seeded first in the MECC tournament.)	NCAA Division II Regional third place
1988–89	John Beilein	15–12	6–6	5th	
1989–90	John Beilein	17–12	5–7	T–5th (Note: Le Moyne finished tied for fourth place with Buffalo and lost both regular-season head-to-head matchups, 70–59, at home on January 6, 1990, and 71–62, on the road on February 15, 1990. Adelphi finished in third place but was ineligible for postseason play. Buffalo was awarded the no. 3 seed in the conference tournament, and Le Moyne was the no. 4 seed.)	
1990–91	John Beilein	19–10	6–4	T–3rd (Note: Le Moyne finished tied for third place with Gannon. The teams split their regular-season head-to-head matchups with Gannon winning at home, 87–84, in overtime on January 26, 1991, and Le Moyne winning at home, 97–75, on February 4, 1991. Philadelphia Textile and Pace finished tied for first place. Le Moyne and Gannon were each 1–1 versus Pace. Le Moyne was awarded the no. 3 seed based on a 1–1 record versus Philadelphia Textile, compared with the 0–2 record of Gannon, which was the no. 4 seed.)	
John Beilein (Independent) (1991–1992)
1991–92	John Beilein	15–11			
John Beilein:		163–94 (.634)	44–35 (.557)		
Scott Hicks (New England Collegiate Conference) (1992–1996)
1992–93	Scott Hicks	18–10	7–7	T–3rd (Note: Le Moyne finished tied for third place with UMass Lowell. The teams split their regular-season head-to-head matchups with UMass Lowell winning on the road, 71–68, on January 9, 1993, and Le Moyne winning on the road, 75–74, on February 21, 1993. Le Moyne was awarded the no. 3 seed in the conference tournament, based on a 1–1 record versus first-place New Hampshire College, compared with the 0–2 record of UMass Lowell, which was the no. 4 seed.)	
1993–94	Scott Hicks	16–11	11–5	3rd	
1994–95	Scott Hicks	16–12	9–7	T–3rd (Note: Le Moyne finished tied for third place with UMass Lowell. The teams split their regular-season head-to-head matchups with both teams winning at home. Le Moyne won, 97–93, on January 7, 1995, and UMasss Lowell won, 87–73, on February 19, 1995. Both teams were winless against first-place New Hampshire College, split against second-place Bridgeport, split against Sacred Heart and Southern Connecticut, which finished tied for fifth place, split against sixth-place Franklin Pierce and swept both seventh-place New Haven and eighth-place Keene State, necessitating a coin flip, which was won by UMass Lowell, the no. 3 seed in the conference tournament. Le Moyne was the no. 4 seed.)	
1995–96	Scott Hicks	24–6	16–4	T–2nd (Note: Le Moyne finished tied for second place with New Hampshire College. The teams split their regular-season head-to-head matchups with New Hampshire College winning at home, 65–64, on December 9, 1995, and Le Moyne winning at home, 77–69, on January 21, 1996. New Hampshire College was awarded the no. 2 seed in the conference tournament, based on a 1–1 record versus first-place Franklin Pierce, compared with the 0–2 record of Le Moyne, which was the no. 3 seed.)	NCAA Division II first round
Scott Hicks (Northeast-10 Conference) (1996–1997)
1996–97	Scott Hicks	13–17	7–11	7th	NCAA Division II first round
Scott Hicks:		87–56 (.608)	50–34 (.595)		
Dave Paulsen (Northeast-10 Conference) (1997–2000)
1997–98	Dave Paulsen	20–8	14–6	T–2nd (Note: Le Moyne finished tied for second place with Assumption. The teams split their regular-season head-to-head matchups with Assumption winning at home, 105–92 in overtime, on November 29, 1997, and Le Moyne winning at home, 91–79, on January 24, 1998. Both teams split their regular-season games against both first-place Stonehill and fourth-place Saint Anselm. Assumption was awarded the no. 2 seed in the conference tournament, based on a 4–0 record versus Bentley and Saint Michael's, which finished tied for fifth-place, compared with the 2–2 record of Le Moyne, which was the no. 3 seed. The NE10 record book incorrectly shows Stonehill with a record of 14–6 and Stonehill, Assumption and Le Moyne as regular-season tri-champions. Stonehill was 15–5 and won the conference regular-season championship outright.)	
1998–99	Dave Paulsen	13–14	8–10	T–6th (Note: Le Moyne finished tied for sixth place with Bentley. The teams split their regular-season head-to-head matchups with Le Moyne winning at home, 73–55, on December 5, 1998, and Bentley winning at home, 72–71, on February 15, 1999. Le Moyne was awarded the no. 6 seed in the conference tournament, based on a 1–1 record versus first-place Saint Anselm, compared with the 0–2 record of Bentley, which was the no. 7 seed.)	
1999–2000	Dave Paulsen	9–17	2–16	10th	
Dave Paulsen:		42–39 (.519)	24–32 (.429)		
Steve Evans (Northeast-10 Conference) (2000–2015)
2000–01	Steve Evans	5–21	2–20	15th	
2001–02	Steve Evans	11–16	7–15	T–11th (Note: Le Moyne finished tied for 11th place with Saint Michael's. Le Moyne was awarded the no. 11 seed in the conference tournament, based on winning both regular-season head-to-head matchups between the teams, 82–65, on the road on December 8, 2001, and 79–62, at home on February 2, 2002. Saint Michael's was the no. 12 seed.)	
2002–03	Steve Evans	17–12	12–10	T–6th (Note: Le Moyne finished tied for sixth place with Bentley and Bryant. Le Moyne was awarded the no. 6 seed in the conference tournament, based on sweeping their regular-season head-to-head matchups with both teams, winning at home against Bryant, 54–53, on December 1, 2002, at home against Bentley, 80–75, on January 14, 2003, and at Bryant, 69–67, on February 1, 2003. Bentley was awarded the no. 7 seed, based on winning, 74–69 in overtime, at Bryant, who was the no. 8 seed, in the only regular-season head-to-head matchup between the teams.)	
2003–04	Steve Evans	17–11	14–8	T–4th (Note: Le Moyne finished tied for fourth place with Bryant. The teams split their regular-season head-to-head matchups with Bryant winning at home, 76–47, on November 30, 2003, and Le Moyne winning at home, 80–59, on January 31, 2004. Le Moyne was awarded the no. 4 seed in the conference tournament, based on a 1–0 record versus first-place UMass Lowell, compared with the 0–2 record of Bryant, which was the no. 5 seed.)	
2004–05	Steve Evans	11–17	9–13	T–9th (Note: Le Moyne finished tied for ninth place with Merrimack. The teams split their regular-season head-to-head matchups with Merrimack winning at home, 63–55, on December 1, 2004, and Le Moyne winning at home, 87–75, on January 17, 2005. Both teams were winless against first-place Bentley and second-place Saint Rose. Le Moyne was awarded the no. 9 seed in the conference tournament, based on a 2–4 record versus Saint Anselm, Southern New Hampshire and Stonehill, which finished tied for third place, compared with the 1–4 record of Merrimack, which was the no. 10 seed.)	
2005–06	Steve Evans	12–16	7–15	12th	
2006–07	Steve Evans	14–15	10–12	T–9th (Note: Le Moyne finished tied for ninth place with Saint Anselm. Saint Anselm was awarded the no. 9 seed in the conference tournament, based on winning both the regular-season head-to-head matchups between the teams, 84–81 in overtime, on the road on December 2, 2006, and 66–49, at home on February 17, 2007. Le Moyne was the no. 10 seed.)	
2007–08	Steve Evans	15–14	12–10	T–5th (Note: Le Moyne finished tied for fifth place with Bryant, Merrimack and Stonehill. Merrimack and Stonehill were each 3–2, Bryant was 2–3 and Le Moyne was 1–2 in games among the teams. Bryant was awarded the no. 7 seed, and Le Moyne was awarded the no. 8 seed in the conference tournament, based on their records in head-to-head matchups among the teams. Merrimack and Stonehill split their two regular-season games and both went winless versus first-place Bentley and second-place Saint Rose in regular-season conference games. Merrimack had a win at Saint Rose in a non-conference game, which was disregarded. Stonehill was awarded the no. 5 seed, based on a 1–1 record versus third-place Assumption, compared with the 0–2 record of Merrimack, which was the no. 6 seed.)	
2008–09	Steve Evans	20–11	13–9	6th	
2009–10	Steve Evans	18–10	14–8	T–4th (Note: Le Moyne finished tied for fourth place with Saint Anselm. Le Moyne was awarded the no. 4 seed in the conference tournament, based on winning the only regular-season head-to-head matchup between the teams, 83–79, at home on January 6, 2010. Saint Anselm was the no. 5 seed.)	
2010–11	Steve Evans	12–15	10–12	T–8th (Note: Le Moyne finished tied for eighth place with Saint Michael's. Le Moyne was awarded the no. 8 seed in the conference tournament, based on winning the only regular-season head-to-head matchup between the teams, 53–52, at home on January 8, 2011. Saint Michael's was the no. 9 seed.)	
2011–12	Steve Evans	12–14	8–14	T–13th (Note: Le Moyne finished tied for 13th place with Southern New Hampshire. Both teams failed to qualify for the conference tournament.)	
2012–13	Steve Evans	13–14	10–12	T–8th (Note: Le Moyne finished tied for eighth place with UMass Lowell and Saint Rose. UMass Lowell was awarded the no. 8 seed in the conference tournament, based on a 2–0 record in games among the teams, compared with the 1–2 records of Le Moyne and Saint Rose. Le Moyne and Saint Rose split their regular-season head-to-head matchups with Saint Rose winning on the road, 68–66, on November 20, 2012, and Le Moyne winning on the road, 79–62, on February 6, 2013. Both teams were winless versus first-place Saint Anselm. Le Moyne was awarded the no. 9 seed, based on a 1–1 record versus second-place Assumption, compared with the 0–2 record of Saint Rose, which was the no. 10 seed.)	
2013–14	Steve Evans	17–12	13–7	3rd Southwest	NCAA Division II first round
2014–15	Steve Evans	16–13	10–10	T–3rd (Note: Le Moyne finished tied for third place in the Southwest Division with New Haven. Le Moyne and New Haven split their regular-season head-to-head matchups with Le Moyne winning at home, 62–44, on November 19, 2014, and New Haven winning at home, 57–56, on February 10, 2015. Both teams were winless versus first-place Southern Connecticut. Le Moyne was awarded the no. 3 divisional seed, based on a 2–0 record versus second-place American International, compared with the 0–2 record of New Haven, which was the no. 4 seed.); Southwest	
Steve Evans:		210–211 (.499)	151–175 (.463)		
Patrick Beilein (Northeast-10 Conference) (2015–2019)
2015–16	Patrick Beilein	10–17	7–13	T–4th (Note: Le Moyne finished tied for fourth place in the Southwest Division with American International. Le Moyne and American International split their regular-season head-to-head matchups with Le Moyne winning at home, 86–69, on December 5, 2015, and American International winning at home, 72–59, on February 6, 2016. Both teams were winless versus first-place Southern Connecticut. Le Moyne was awarded the no. 4 divisional seed, based on a 1–1 record versus second-place Adelphi, compared with the 0–2 record of American International, which was the no. 5 seed.); Southwest	
2016–17	Patrick Beilein	22–7	16–4	1st (Note: Had best regular-season conference record of all NE10 teams, regardless of division.); Southwest	NCAA Division II first round
2017–18	Patrick Beilein	27–7	18–2	1st Southwest	NCAA Division II Elite Eight
2018–19	Patrick Beilein	18–10	14–6	1st Southwest	NCAA Division II first round
Patrick Beilein:		77–41 (.653)	55–25 (.688)		
Nate Champion (Northeast-10 Conference) (2019–2023)
2019–20	Nate Champion	19–9	15–4	1st Southwest	Selected as No. 5 seed in NCAA East Region; No postseason held (COVID-19 pandemic).
2020–21	Nate Champion	—	—		Season cancelled (COVID-19 pandemic).
2021–22	Nate Champion	12–15	8–11	5th Southwest	
2022–23	Nate Champion	15–15	11–9	T–5th (Note: Le Moyne finished tied for fifth place with Franklin Pierce, Pace and Southern Connecticut. Le Moyne and Southern Connecticut were each 3–2, Pace was 3–3 and Franklin Pierce was 2–4 in games among the teams. Pace was awarded the no. 7 seed, and Franklin Pierce was awarded the no. 8 seed in the conference tournament, based on their records in head-to-head matchups among the teams. Southern Connecticut was awarded the no. 5 seed in the conference tournament, based on winning their only regular-season head-to-head matchup with Le Moyne, 73–71, at home on January 18, 2023. Le Moyne was the no. 6 seed.)	
Nate Champion (Northeast Conference) (2023–present)
2023–24	Nate Champion	15–17 (Note: Ineligible for NCAA tournament or NIT due to transition from Division II.)	9–7	T-4th (Note: Le Moyne finished tied for fourth place with Fairleigh Dickinson. The teams split their regular-season head-to-head matchups with Le Moyne winning on the road, 74–63, on January 6, 2024, and Fairleigh Dickinson winning on the road, 68–58, on February 24, 2024. Le Moyne was awarded the no. 4 seed in the conference tournament, based on a 2–2 record versus Central Connecticut and Merrimack, which finished tied for first-place, compared with the 0–4 record of Fairleigh Dickinson, which was the no. 5 seed.)	
2024–25	Nate Champion	9–23	4–12	T-8th (Note: Le Moyne finished tied for eighth place with Chicago State. Since Mercyhurst finished third but was ineligible for the NEC tournament, due to its transition from Division II, the eighth- and ninth-place teams were the no. 7 and 8 seeds in the conference tournament. Le Moyne and Chicago State split their regular-season head-to-head matchups with Chicago State winning at home, 88–72, on January 18, 2025, and Le Moyne winning at home, 80–75, on February 15, 2025. Both teams were winless against first-place Central Connecticut. Chicago State was awarded the no. 7 seed in the conference tournament, based on a 1–1 record versus second-place LIU, compared with the 0–2 record of Le Moyne, which was the no. 8 seed.)	
Nate Champion (Division II):		46–39 (.541)	34–24 (.586)		
Nate Champion (Division I):		24–40 (.375)	13–19 (.406)		
Nate Champion:		70–79 (.470)	47–43 (.522)		
ECIAC:			2–3 (.400)		
MECAA:			62–46 (.574)		
MECC:			44–35 (.557)		
NECC:			43–23 (.652)		
NE10:			271–267 (.504)		
NEC:			13–19 (.406)		
Pre-division NCAA:		93–69 (.574)	6–5 (.545)		
Division II:		972–751 (.564) (Note: Includes College Division from 1956 to 1973.)	416–369 (.530)		
Division I:		24–40 (.375)	13–19 (.406)		
Top-tier program:		117–109 (.518) (Note: Includes Division I seasons and pre-division NCAA seasons through 1955–56. The Associated Press (AP) began publishing separate rankings of major programs and small colleges during the 1947–48 season, and the NCAA recognizes teams included in the major program poll as de facto Division I programs for those nine seasons. Le Moyne was included in the small college poll from the inception of its varsity program. Nevertheless, Le Moyne played a schedule that included a significant number of major program opponents from the 1948–49 season through the 1955–56 season. Of the 162 collegiate contests played by Le Moyne over those eight seasons, 59 (36%) of them featured opponents that were classified as major programs by the AP. Le Moyne was 20–39 in those 59 games, including 5–5 in 1954–55, when 10 (53%) of their 19 games were against major programs, and 5–4 in 1955–56, when nine (43%) of their 21 games were against major programs. Also, during those eight seasons, Le Moyne appeared in two National Catholic Invitational Tournaments, a tournament that included both major programs and small colleges but was widely regarded at the time as the third most prestigious postseason event in college basketball behind the NCAA tournament and the NIT. Since Le Moyne was eligible for what would eventually become the NCAA Division I tournament during the pre-division era and played a schedule comparable to teams classified as major programs, this combination of records is useful in analyzing Le Moyne's results as a team in the top flight of college basketball.)	19–24 (.442)		
Total:		1,089–860 (.559)	435–393 (.525)		
National champion Postseason invitational champion Conference regular season champion Conference regular season and conference tournament champion Division regular season champion Division regular season and conference tournament champion Conference tournament champion

== Postseason results ==
The NCAA tournament started in 1939, and the number of teams invited to participate has expanded a number of times over the years. Between 1939 and 1950, the tournament had only eight teams, and then, between 1951 and 1956, the number of participants varied between 16 and 25 teams. Le Moyne was never selected to participate in the tournament prior to the split of the NCAA into divisions. Since Le Moyne started their transition to Division I in 2023, they will become eligible to be selected or qualify for the Division I tournament for the first time since 1956, starting in 2027, assuming they meet the new criteria under January 2025 NCAA legislation to have their four-year transition period reduced to three years and apply to the NCAA to do so. As of 2025, 68 teams participate in the tournament each year.

The first College Division tournament was held in 1957, and Le Moyne was first selected to participate in 1959. The College Division tournament became the Division II tournament in 1974. Le Moyne participated in the tournament 14 times between 1957 and 2023.

The Eastern College Athletic Conference (ECAC) held a postseason tournament for College Division teams in 1973, and then annual combined tournaments for Division II and III teams from 1974 through 1980. Tournaments for Division II teams resumed in 1988, and were held each year until 2008, except for 2006. One more Division II tournament was held in 2014. ECAC member teams were invited to participate in these tournaments by a selection committee, if they did not receive a bid to the NCAA tournament. Le Moyne has been a member of the ECAC since 1958, but never participated in an ECAC tournament.

The National Invitation Tournament (NIT) began in 1938, with only six teams. It expanded several times, reaching a peak of 40 participating teams between 2002 and 2006. After the split of the NCAA into divisions, the NIT had no rule that prevented College Division (or, later, Division II or Division III) teams from participating. In fact, Southern Illinois won the 1967 NIT in their final season as a College Division team. Starting in 2006, the first year the NIT was operated by the NCAA, only Division I teams may participate in the NIT. Le Moyne has never been invited to participate in the NIT. The Dolphins may not be selected to play in the NIT until 2027, assuming their transition period will have been completed by then. The NIT includes 32 teams per tournament as of 2025.

The College Basketball Invitational (CBI) and CollegeInsider.com Postseason Tournament (CIT) are postseason tournaments that select Division I teams that are not participating in either the NCAA tournament or the NIT. The CIT only selects teams from conferences it considers to be mid-major conferences. As of 2025, CollegeInsider.com excludes the American, the Atlantic 10, the ACC, the Big 12, the Big East, the Big Ten, the Mountain West and the SEC. In the past, Conference USA was also excluded. The College Basketball Crown (CBC) is a postseason tournament, started in 2025, that selects teams not participating in the NCAA tournament and may also extend invitations to teams that have qualified or been selected for the NIT. Since the CBC, CBI and CIT are not operated by the NCAA, they may invite transitioning Division I teams to participate, and Le Moyne was eligible starting with the 2024 postseason. In the past, both the CBI and the CIT have extended invitations to transitioning teams.

Seedings and results in the table below sort after taking into account the prestige of the tournament. For instance, events involving Division I teams will sort ahead of those for Division II teams. If the tournament was unseeded, or if Le Moyne was an unseeded participant in a tournament in which some teams were seeded, a seed value was computed based on whether Le Moyne was given home-court advantage and where the Dolphins were placed in the tournament bracket.

Tournament	Seed	Results	Ref.
1950; Utica Optimist Club tournament		Utica Optimist Club champion Won Semifinal vs. Brockport State, 67–60; Won Final at Utica, 59–57	
1951; Utica Optimist Club tournament		Utica Optimist Club champion Won Semifinal at Utica, 86–69; Won Final vs. Hartwick, 86–65	
1951; National Catholic Invitational tournament		National Catholic Invitational third place Won First Round vs. Saint Michael's, 95–57; Won Quarterfinal at Siena, 57–53; Lost Semifinal vs. St. Francis (NY), 66–84; Won Third-Place Game vs. Mount St. Mary's, 63–61	
1952; Utica Optimist Club tournament		Utica Optimist Club champion Won Semifinal at Utica, 72–42; Won Final vs. Hartwick, 72–61	
1952; National Catholic Invitational tournament		National Catholic Invitational quarterfinalist Won First Round vs. Providence, 67–63; Lost Quarterfinal vs. St. Francis (NY), 61–75	
1959; NCAA College Division tournament		NCAA College Division Sweet 16; Won Regional Semifinal vs. Williams, 72–66; Lost Sweet 16 at Saint Michael's, 70–71	
1960; NCAA College Division tournament		NCAA College Division Regional fourth place Lost Regional Semifinal vs. St. Anselm, 75–108; Lost Regional Third-Place Game vs. Assumption, 68–94	
1964; NCAA College Division tournament		NCAA College Division Sweet 16; Won Regional Semifinal vs. Youngstown State, 64–53; Lost Sweet 16 at Akron, 38–62	
1965; NCAA College Division tournament		NCAA College Division Regional fourth place Lost Regional Semifinal vs. Assumption, 58–76; Lost Regional Third-Place Game vs. Hartwick, 68–70	
1966; NCAA College Division tournament		NCAA College Division Regional fifth place Lost First Round vs. Philadelphia Textile, 61–83; Won Consolation Game vs. Potsdam State, 86–63	
1968; NCAA College Division tournament		NCAA College Division Regional seventh place Lost First Round vs. Buffalo State, 66–83; Lost Consolation Game vs. Northeastern, 54–67	
1969; NCAA College Division tournament		NCAA College Division Regional fourth place Lost Regional Semifinal vs. Montclair State, 77–81; Lost Regional Third-Place Game vs. Albany State (NY), 70–71	
1988; NCAA Division II tournament	3	NCAA Division II Regional third place Lost Regional Semifinal vs. California (PA), 88–91; Won Regional Third-Place Game vs. Kutztown, 89–81	
1996; NCAA Division II tournament	5	NCAA Division II first round Lost First Round vs. Franklin Pierce, 53–83	
1997; NCAA Division II tournament	6	NCAA Division II first round Lost First Round vs. Saint Rose, 76–92	
2014; NCAA Division II tournament	6	NCAA Division II first round Lost First Round vs. Saint Anselm, 62–73	
2017; NCAA Division II tournament	1	NCAA Division II first round Lost First Round vs. Merrimack, 68–72^{OT}	
2018; NCAA Division II tournament	1	NCAA Division II Elite Eight; Won First Round vs. Jefferson, 75–57; Won Regional Semifinal vs. Saint Rose, 67–63; Won Sweet 16 vs. Bloomfield, 75–59; Lost Elite Eight vs. West Texas A&M, 73–87	
2019; NCAA Division II tournament	3	NCAA Division II first round Lost First Round vs. St. Thomas Aquinas, 59–61	
