= NCIT =

NCIT may refer to:

- Nepal College of Information Technology, a college in Nepal
- North Coast Inland Trail, a trail project in Ohio, United States
- National Catholic Invitational Tournament, a US college basketball tournament 1949-1952
