= History of Le Moyne Dolphins men's basketball (1963–1966) =

NCAA Division I men's basketball team representing Le Moyne College

The history of Le Moyne Dolphins men's basketball from 1963 to 1966 includes the Dolphins' three consecutive appearances in the NCAA College Division tournament. Led by sophomore Gary DeYulia and senior Tom Cooney, Le Moyne reached the Sweet 16 of the 1964 tournament. Tom Mullen and Dan Frawley provided a strong inside game to complement DeYulia's scoring, and the Dolphins repeated as conference champions but lost in the first round of the 1965 tournament. Head coach Tommy Niland was named conference coach of the year in both 1964 and 1965. As a senior, DeYulia was conference player of the year and teamed with Mullen to lead the Dolphins to a berth in the 1966 tournament, with regional games hosted by Le Moyne for the second straight year. Le Moyne finished third in Section B of the Northeast Region. The Dolphins were 52–17 between the 1963–64 and 1965–66 seasons, including a 7–2 record against University Division opponents.

== Return to the NCAA tournament (1963–1964) ==
Seniors Ralph Yahn and 5'8" Tom Cooney were named co-captains for the 1963–64 season. The Dolphins' leading scorer Mickey Flynn and Chris Pittman, who were Le Moyne's co-captains the previous season, graduated along with Bob Yahn, Jim Downey and Bob Hunt. Senior Dick Myers and juniors Dan Frawley, Dick Martyns, Dick Reece and Mike Downey returned to the team. Sophomores Tom Mullen, Gary DeYulia, Gerry Glose and Jon Cook were added to the varsity roster. Junior Mike Lawler, a transfer from Buffalo, became eligible to play after sitting out a year.

After a convincing 72–44 win in their December 1, 1963 opener over Scranton, the Dolphins sputtered to a 3–4 record in their first seven games. Things started to turn around, when Le Moyne visited a pair of MECAA foes in the New York metropolitan area. In Jersey City, Le Moyne dominated Saint Peter's, 86–71, on January 10, 1964, to even their overall record at 4–4 and their MECAA mark at 1–1. Dan Frawley had a game-high 21 points for the Dolphins, who had four players in double figures. After the Peacocks had an early 15–14 lead, Le Moyne pushed ahead for good and never looked back.

The following day, the Dolphins met St. Francis (NY) at the 69th Regiment Armory in Manhattan. After falling behind, 3–0, Le Moyne went on a 13–0 run to move ahead and held the lead the rest of the way. The Dolphins again had four players in double figures in the scoring column, led by sophomore Gary DeYulia, who posted 14 points. Tom Cooney's fabulous playmaking and pressing defense keyed Le Moyne's victory. Cooney finished with 12 points and shot 5 for 9 from the floor. The Dolphins improved to 5–4 overall and 2–1 in MECAA play. The win was Le Moyne's 37th all-time over a University Division/major program.

The Dolphins rallied late to take control of their January 18 game at Alfred and went on to a 70–66 victory. Gary DeYulia had 22 points for Le Moyne, and Tom Cooney added 20. Dan Frawley had a double-double with 15 points and 14 rebounds for Le Moyne.

On January 25, Saint Michael's switched to a zone defense, which seemed to confuse the Dolphins, and a furious rally by the Purple Knights erased the home team's 40–26 halftime lead and tied the game at 69 with less than two minutes to play. The Dolphins maintained their composure and outscored Saint Michael's, 6–2, in the closing minutes to secure a 75–71 victory, their fourth straight. Gary DeYulia's free throw gave Le Moyne a 70–69 lead. After Richie Tarrant, who finished with 30 points for Saint Michael's, turned the ball over under the basket, Tom Cooney drove to the basket and completed a three-point play, giving the Dolphins a 73–69 lead with 33 seconds remaining. A pair of free throws by Tarrant cut Le Moyne's lead to two points. On the Dolphins' next possession, the Purple Knights forced a jump ball with eight seconds on the clock. Ralph Yahn tipped the ball to Cooney, who passed it to Dick Myers for a layup at the final buzzer. All five Dolphins starters scored in double figures, led by DeYulia's 18 points.

The Dolphins took over first-place in the MECAA, improving their league record to 3–1, with a dominant home win over Iona on February 1. Le Moyne scored the first five points of the second half to extend their six-point halftime lead. The Gaels never got closer than seven points behind the rest of the way, and the Dolphins cruised to a 74–56 victory. Gary DeYulia led Le Moyne with 28 points, and Tom Cooney added 19. Dick Myers had a double-double, scoring 16 points and collecting 12 rebounds against the Iona boardsmen, who entered the game leading the University Division in rebounding. The Dolphins had a 50–38 rebounding edge for the game. The loss dropped Iona to 10–3 overall and 1–1 in MECAA play and clouded their hopes for an NIT bid. Le Moyne's fifth straight win improved their overall record to 8–4 and was their 38th all-time victory over a University Division/major program.

Following an 87–56 home win over Clarkson, the Dolphins clinched at least a share of the MECAA title with a 54–46 win at Siena, their seventh straight victory. Le Moyne pulled away from the Indians with a 6–0 run late in the first half to extend their lead to eight points, and Siena never got closer than four points behind the rest of the way. Gary DeYulia led the Dolphins with a game-high 15 points.

After pulling away from St. Lawrence late on the road and cruising to an 85–69 win, the Dolphins journeyed to Massachusetts for a pair of road games with their eight-game winning streak inspiring talk of a possible bid to the NCAA tournament, provided their trip was successful.

The Dolphins fell behind early at Stonehill on February 14, but recovered on the strength of Gary DeYulia's scoring to get back into the game. The teams battled back and forth until Dick Munson's jump shot in the closing seconds broke a tie and gave the Chieftains a 53–51 lead. Le Moyne called timeout with just three seconds to play. The ensuing inbounds pass went to DeYulia, who drained a 35-footer at the buzzer to send the game to overtime. The Chieftains suffocated DeYulia during the extra session, but an offensive rebound put-back by Dick Myers put the Dolphins in front. Tom Cooney hit a jump shot and followed that with a steal and a layup. Le Moyne held on for a 61–58 triumph, their ninth straight victory. DeYulia finished with 31 points.

The following night, the Dolphins visited Assumption, who were ranked no. 6 in the College Division media poll at the time. After Le Moyne had a one-point lead at halftime, Assumption opened the second half with an 18–4 run over the first seven minutes and later extended their lead to 16 points. The Dolphins chipped away at the lead during the later stages of the second half and cut the deficit to four points with 10 seconds to go. However, Assumption hit their free throws and scored a basket in the closing moments to secure a 74–66 victory. Dick Myers had a double-double, scoring 18 points and grabbing 12 rebounds for Le Moyne. The loss ended Le Moyne's winning streak at nine games, the longest in program history, and dropped the Dolphins' record to 12–5.

Iona had a 13-point lead with seven minutes to play, when they hosted Saint Peter's on February 22. The Gaels, facing the pressure of a possible NIT bid, fell apart down the stretch and suffered a home loss, 68–66, on Tim Kehoe's buzzer-beater. The Iona loss dropped them to 3–2 in MECAA play and gave Le Moyne the 1964 MECAA championship outright.

Followers of the Dolphins thought the loss to Assumption might keep Le Moyne out of the NCAA tournament. However, the Dolphins' 65–63 late-season victory at Buffalo ended the Bulls' 45-game home winning streak. With Buffalo leading, 59–56, with five minutes remaining, Tom Cooney scored five straight points followed by a Gary DeYulia basket to give Le Moyne a 63–59 lead. After the Bulls cut the Dolphins' lead to two points, Ralph Yahn scored his only basket of the game to extend Le Moyne's lead to four points with a minute remaining and put the game away. DeYulia had a double-double, scoring a game-high 24 points on 10-for-18 shooting and pulling down 14 rebounds. Cooney finished with 17 points. It was the Dolphins fourth straight win and 13th in their previous 14 games. That was enough to capture the selection committee's attention and secure an invitation to the NCAA tournament.

The Dolphins concluded the regular season with a home game against Ithaca, which had already received an NCAA tournament bid, on March 3. After Le Moyne claimed a 30–18 halftime lead, which they extended to 37–21, the Bombers' defense got them back into the game, and the Dolphins' lead stood at 62–56 with two minutes to play. A three-point play by Tom Cooney and a fast-break basket scored by Gary DeYulia off a Cooney pass sandwiched around two Ithaca points extended Le Moyne's lead back to nine points and put the game out of reach. The Dolphins held on for a 69–64 victory. Dan Frawley had a double-double, scoring 13 points and grabbing 15 rebounds. Ralph Yahn, playing the final home game of his collegiate career, also had 15 rebounds and added nine points. Cooney, in his home-court swan song, excelled at running the fast-break offense and contributed 15 points. Senior Dick Myers spent much of the game in foul trouble but managed 11 points. Sophomore Gary DeYulia led the Dolphins with 20 points. During warm-up drills before the game, reserve sophomore Jon Cook collided with a teammate and tore ligaments in his knee. Despite being unable to play, Cook traveled with the team to the NCAA tournament.

Le Moyne entered the NCAA tournament with a 17–5 regular-season record and winners of five straight and 14 of their previous 15 games. The Dolphins were matched with Youngstown State, ranked no. 6 nationally in the Associated Press College Division poll at the time, in the regional semifinals. Le Moyne's stifling defense, fierce rebounding and hot shooting by Gary DeYulia led to a six-point burst in just a minute and a half that put them ahead, 54–44, with 4:08 to play, and the Dolphins were not challenged the rest of the way. DeYulia shot 10 for 15 and had a game-high 20 points. As a team, the Dolphins shot 57% from the floor, while their zone defense limited the Penguins to 39% shooting.

The Dolphins met Akron, the region's host in the Mideast Regional Final Sweet 16 game. The Zips scored early and often. Meanwhile, it took six and a half minutes for the Dolphins to put their first points on the board. Akron dominated the game wire to wire, winning by a score of 62–38. Akron's defense frustrated Le Moyne's top scorer Gary DeYulia, who finished with six points on 2-for-15 shooting. Le Moyne's Tom Cooney was named to the All-Regional team. Cooney had 24 points in the two tournament games.

Tommy Niland was named 1964 MECAA coach of the year, the fourth time he was so honored. Gary DeYulia was named All-MECAA first team, and Tom Cooney was selected for the second team. DeYulia was also named an Eastern College Athletic Conference (ECAC) All-Star.

== Hosting a Christmas invitational and NCAA regionals (1964–1965) ==
In April 1964, Le Moyne College announced that it would sponsor and participate in a four-team Christmas invitational basketball tournament to take place on December 29 and 30. Buffalo had already committed to participate. Le Moyne athletic director and men's basketball coach would serve as the tournament director.

Preseason practices opened on October 15, 1964. The Dolphins lost point guard Tom Cooney, Ralph Yahn and Dick Lynch, both strong inside players, and Dick Myers to graduation, but leading scorer junior Gary DeYula returned along with senior Dan Frawley, the team's second leading rebounder. Senior Dick Martyns and junior Jerry Glose, both of whom played well in limited action the previous season, also returned. Junior Tom Mullen lost weight during the offseason and was expected to compete for the starting center role. Seniors Mike Lawler, Dick Reece and Mike Downey and junior Jon Cook all returned. The leading scorer of the previous season's freshman team, Eric Pitman, two other players who each averaged 16 points per game as freshmen, Gerry Ballone and Leo Miller, and Mike Cavotta were expected to be contributors to the varsity team as sophomores. Frawley and Lawler were named co-captains. Sophomore Michael Donegan and junior Bob McCann were added to the roster prior to the start of the season, bringing the total number of new sophomores to five. McCann did not play during the previous season as a sophomore.

The Dolphins were coming off a home loss to Hartwick, having allowed a 13-point lead to slip away, and were 2–2 on the young season as their Christmas invitational tournament got under way. In the opening game, Saint Michael's outscored Buffalo, 93–86, setting a new venue record for most combined points by two teams in the brief history of the Le Moyne Athletic Center. The Dolphins took an early 21–8 lead, which they increased to 40–24 by halftime, against Oswego State on their way to an 81–64 victory. Gary DeYulia led Le Moyne with 18 points. Tom Mullen and Dan Frawley both had double-doubles with each player collecting 10 rebounds to go with 17 points for Mullen and 15 for Frawley.

The following evening, Buffalo defeated Oswego State, 88–59, in the tournament consolation game. Tom Mullen's solid guarding held Purple Knight Richie Tarrant, who entered the contest averaging more than 32 points per game, to just 19 points. Gary DeYulia was exceptionally efficient on offense, scoring a game-high 22 points on 11-for-12 shooting from the floor. Dan Frawley had a double-double with 13 points and 13 rebounds. Despite how well the Dolphins performed, the lead changed hands several times, and Le Moyne found themselves with a one-point advantage at 64–63 with 1:09 to play. A Frawley layup extended the lead to three points. Tarrant hit a free throw to cut the Dolphins' lead to two. Dick Reece scored just four points in the game for the Dolphins, but two of them came on both ends of a one-and-one with 45 seconds to play to give Le Moyne a four-point lead. Tarrant fouled out on the play. Saint Michael's got a pair of free throws with 30 seconds left, but the Dolphins were able to run out the clock and secure a 68–66 victory and the tournament championship. DeYulia was named the tournament's most valuable player and presented a trophy by the Very Rev. William Reilly, S.J., president of Le Moyne College. Coach Tommy Niland accepted the tournament championship trophy from the Greater Syracuse Chamber of Commerce on behalf of the team.

The Christmas tournament turned out to be the launching point of a record-breaking Dolphins winning streak, which reached five games, when Le Moyne won, 67–64, at Iona on January 9, 1965. With the Gaels leading, 62–60, late in the game, a three-point play by Dick Martyns, who finished with eight points, gave the Dolphins a one-point lead. After Iona went back in front, Gary DeYulia's jumper from the top of the key with 12 seconds to play put Le Moyne ahead, 65–64. The Dolphins got a stop on the defensive end, and Dan Frawley, who had eight points, hit a pair of free throws with one second remaining to put the game out of reach. DeYulia scored 21 points, 17 in the second half, on 8-for-13 shooting to lead the Dolphins. The win improved the Dolphins to 7–2 overall and 1–1 in MECAA play and was Le Moyne's 39th all-time over a University Division/major program.

Before the start of the 1964–65 season, Saint Peter's moved up from the NCAA's College Division to the University Division, giving the MECAA three University Division teams (St. Francis (NY), Iona and Saint Peter's) and three College Division teams (Le Moyne, Siena and King's). The Peacocks became Le Moyne's eighth straight victim, as the Dolphins defeated Saint Peter's, 75–55, on January 27. After leading by one point at halftime, Le Moyne went on an 18–6 second-half run that separated the teams, and the Peacocks were unable to close the deficit. Tom Mullen had a double-double for the Dolphins with 22 points on 9-for-13 shooting and 13 rebounds. Le Moyne dominated the boards by a 48–35 margin. The Dolphins' aggressive defense held the Peacocks well below their 82 points per game scoring average. Le Moyne improved to 10–2 overall and 2–1 in MECAA play with the win, their 40th all-time over a University Division/major program opponent.

The Dolphins' winning streak reached 10 games, the longest in program history, when Le Moyne defeated St. Francis (NY), 53–46, on February 6. Three straight baskets by Dick Martyns broke open a close game and gave the Dolphins a 48–38 lead with four minutes to go. Le Moyne used a pressing defense to frustrate the Terriers, who had a three-inch average height advantage. St. Francis shot just 29% from the floor, despite the Terriers coming into the game with the second highest shooting accuracy in the University Division at over 50%. Gary DeYulia led the Dolphins with 17 points. Tom Mullen had a double-double with 12 points and 11 rebounds. Gerry Glose had two key rebounds in the final minutes, as the Terriers tried to get back into the game, and also contributed seven points. A crowd of 2,200 was heard chanting "N-C-A-A" as the game drew to a conclusion. The win improved Le Moyne's overall record to 12–2 and moved them into first place in the MECAA with a 3–1 mark in league play. The victory was Le Moyne's 41st all time over a University Division/major program.

After the Dolphins won their 11th straight game, 63–44, at Ithaca on February 10, an NCAA tournament selection committee member indicated that Le Moyne was being considered for an at-large berth in the tournament. Le Moyne's February 13 home game against Assumption, also a tournament bid contender, was considered a key matchup for both teams in their quests for tournament invitations and, possibly, opportunities to host regional games. A strong advantage on the boards helped the Dolphins build a 34–25 halftime lead, which ballooned to 17 points at 42–25. Le Moyne outrebounded Assumption, 44–31. The Dolphins appeared comfortably in front, 70–55, with four minutes to play. After Gerry Glose, who had 13 rebounds, fouled out, the Greyhounds had more success on the boards and used their pressing defense to make a late charge, and a 13–3 run cut Le Moyne's lead to five points. Dick Reece found Tom Mullen under the basket for a layup, and Mullen sank a free throw to complete a three-point play to extend the Dolphins' lead to eight points with 38 seconds remaining. The Greyhounds scored the game's final five points, but Le Moyne held on for a 76–73 victory. Mullen scored 24 points, shot 11 for 13 from the floor and 2 for 2 from the free-throw line and grabbed 16 rebounds for the Dolphins, who won their 12th straight game and improved to 14–2.

The Dolphins' winning streak hit 13 on February 17, when they drubbed Hobart, 85–43, despite the absence of their top two scorers, Gary DeYulia and Tom Mullen, who were both nursing colds. Dick Reece led Le Moyne with 16 points.

Gary DeYulia and Tom Mullen returned to the lineup for the Dolphins' 91–68 blowout victory over Alfred, who came into the game 14–5, on February 20. Mullen had a double-double with 16 points and 10 rebounds but appeared to suffer an ankle injury during the game. DeYulia led Le Moyne with 17 points. Ed Mandell had 31 points for the Saxons, who came into the game averaging 85 points per contest, but were held to 31% shooting from the floor by the Dolphins' defense. Le Moyne's 14th straight win improved their record to 16–2 and inspired the crowd of 2,000 spectators to yell "N-C-A-A" throughout the game in anticipation of a bid to the tournament.

On February 23, Le Moyne received and accepted a bid to host the Northeast Regionals of the 1965 NCAA College Division tournament. Aside from the Dolphins' 16–2 record, the selection committee cited the outstanding support shown by both students and area residents for the Dolphins at recent games as well as during the Christmas tournament. Le Moyne head coach Tommy Niland was named tournament director for the regional. Le Moyne announced that tickets could be reserved by phone starting at 9 a.m. on February 24, and would be available for pick-up on February 27. Student passes would not be honored for the tournament games; however, students could purchase tickets at a discounted price of $1.50 for each doubleheader session. Reserved tickets were priced at $2 per doubleheader session or $3.50 for all four games. General admission bleacher tickets were available for $1.50 per night. Le Moyne rented portable bleachers from the West Jefferson Street Armory to expand seating capacity for the tournament by about 500. Since the tournament bid created a conflict, the Dolphins rescheduled their home game against Siena from March 6 to February 28. Coach Niland appointed Manlius Military Academy athletic director and basketball coach Whitey Anderson as official scorer for the tournament games. Incredibly, all these arrangements were announced by Le Moyne the same day the selection committee announced it had been chosen to host the regional. Le Moyne also announced that the foot injury Tom Mullen suffered in the game against Alfred would keep him out of the February 24 game against Clarkson. Coach Niland hoped that Mullen would be available for the February 27 game at Buffalo.

Gerry Glose came off the bench to score 18 points on 7-for-11 shooting to lead the Dolphins to a 61–51 victory at Clarkson on February 24. Gary DeYulia, slowed by a calf injury, had 18 points for Le Moyne, who won their 15th straight game and improved to 17–2 on the season.

Norb Baschnagel's basket with three minutes to play gave Buffalo a 58–57 lead over Le Moyne at the Buffalo Memorial Auditorium on February 27. After an empty possession for the Dolphins, two free throws put the Bulls ahead by three points, and they held on to win, 62–59, ending Le Moyne's program-record 15-game winning streak. Buffalo improved to 16–2 with the win, as they prepared for the NCAA tournament. Gary DeYulia had 26 points for the Dolphins, who dropped to 17–3 on the season.

The Dolphins struggled at the start of their regular-season finale against Siena on February 28, failing to score a basket until 9:35 had elapsed on the clock. Le Moyne recovered to take a five-point halftime lead. The Indians got within two points at 42–40 midway through the second half, but baskets by Mike Lawler and Tom Mullen extended the lead. Moments later, Dan Cunha was hit with a technical foul for arguing a call. The ensuing free throw and another charity toss on the personal foul extended the Dolphins' lead to 49–42, and Le Moyne went on to a 58–48 victory. After Gary DeYulia felt he was unnecessarily shoved out of bounds, a brief melee ensued between the rival teams, and a Siena player was promptly slammed to the floor by a Dolphin. It appeared it might spread into the stands where the Siena fans were sitting, but cooler heads quickly prevailed. DeYulia finished the game with just six points on 2-for-20 shooting from the floor. Eric Pitman led the Dolphins with 10 points. The win improved Le Moyne to 4–1 in MECAA play, assuring them of at least a share of the conference title. The behavior of the Le Moyne players and fans in connection with the melee was criticized in Siena's school newspaper.

Before the Siena game, Saint Michael's, Hartwick and Assumption were announced as the other three teams participating in the Northeast Regionals. A few hours after the regional field was announced, all tickets were sold out. The Dolphins defeated Saint Michael's, 68–66, at home in the Christmas tournament and on the road, 65–64, on January 23. Le Moyne earned a home victory over Assumption, 76–73, on February 13. Hartwick handed Le Moyne their only home loss of the regular season, 60–53, on December 16.

Mark Palinski scored 28 points to lead Siena to an 80–72 victory over Saint Peter's on March 2. The University Division Peacocks fell to 2–2 in MECAA play with the loss to the College Division Indians and were eliminated from the league title race, giving Le Moyne its second consecutive outright conference championship.

Assumption executed a suffocating defensive effort, frustrating the Dolphins and earning a 76–58 victory. Le Moyne trailed by 16 at halftime and spent most of the game in foul trouble. The Dolphins' leading scorer, Gary DeYulia, scored Le Moyne's first four points on a layup and a jump shot but was shut down by the Greyhounds the rest of the way, finishing with just four points. Trailing 48–27 in the second half, Tom Mullen, who had 18 points in the game, scored six points during a 10–0 Dolphins run, but Le Moyne never got closer than 11 points behind the Greyhounds. Le Moyne shot 26 for 67 (39%) from the field. Dan Frawley had a double-double with 10 points and 11 boards, leading the Dolphins to a 44–38 rebounding edge for the game.

In the regional third-place game, Gary DeYulia's steal and transition basket capped a run that gave the Dolphins a 53–51 lead and thrilled the crowd in the Le Moyne Athletic Center. Hartwick responded immediately with a run of their own to go ahead by 64–56. Le Moyne fought back, led by Eric Pitman and Dick Martyns and had the ball down by two points with 31 seconds to play. However, DeYulia's shot at the buzzer fell short, and the Warriors held on for a 70–68 victory. DeYulia and Tom Mullen led the Dolphins with 17 points each. Mullen also grabbed nine rebounds. Gerry Glose scored 10 points and had nine rebounds for the Dolphins.

Gary DeYulia was named a 1965 ECAC first-team All-Star. He also received honorable mention for the 1965 Little All-America team. DeYulia was also honored as first-team All-MECAA, and Tom Mullen was named to the second team. Tommy Niland won his fifth MECAA coach of the year award.

== Hosting the tournament again (1965–1966) ==
In September 1965, the NCAA granted the State University of New York Athletic Conference (SUNYAC) an automatic berth in the NCAA College Division tournament. Dolphins head coach Tommy Niland said that he was generally in favor of automatic qualification for the tournament, but, with one less at-large bid available, and the NCAA limiting how many teams from each area of the country enter the tournament, it would now be more difficult for teams in the northeast, including Le Moyne, to be selected. Niland pointed out that none of the schools in the SUNYAC had ever been selected in the past and that the conference might not be strong enough to merit an automatic bid. The SUNYAC joined the Middle Atlantic States Collegiate Athletic Conference (MASCAC) and the Tri-State Collegiate Basketball League as conferences with automatic tournament bids. This left five at-large bids available for the nearly 200 teams in the northeast, designated by the NCAA as District 1, since teams from this area generally participated in either the Northeast or East Regionals, each of which comprised four teams. Since the MASCAC was very large, with more than 20 teams, it split into two divisions: the Middle Atlantic Conference (MAC) North Division and the MAC South Division, and each division applied for and received an automatic bid to the NCAA tournament. This left only four at-large bids available for teams from the northeast. After considering the large number of teams in District 1, particularly high-quality teams without access to an automatic bid, the NCAA decided that instead of two regions of four teams each as had previously been the case, District 1 would have 12 bids with regional games played at three sites. The winner emerging from one of these sites would go directly to the national quarterfinals, while the other two winners would play each other for a quarterfinal berth. One site would feature the two MAC teams and two at-large teams. The second site would have the Tri-State League champion and three at-large teams. The SUNYAC champion and three at-large teams would play at the third site.

Practices for the 1965–66 season opened on October 15, 1965. Returning players included seniors Gary DeYulia, the Dolphins' leading scorer the previous two seasons, Tom Mullen, second in scoring in 1964–65, Gerry Glose, Jon Cook and Bob McCann and juniors Gerry Ballone, Mike Donegan, Eric Pitman and Leo Miller. Dan Frawley, Dick Martyns, Mike Lawler, Dick Reece and Mike Downey were all lost to graduation. Sophomores expected to play roles on the team were Gerry McDermott, Tom Devins, Dave Cary, Greg Bonk, Pat Gregory and Jim Mariotte. DeYulia was named team captain. Glose and Eric Pitman, both of whom were part of the previous season's rotation, were expected to play significant roles. During the pre-season, coach Tommy Niland expected the Dolphins to have more speed and be less physical than the previous season's team. He planned to have the team increase its pace on offense to take advantage of its strengths.

The Dolphins' 1965–66 schedule released prior to the season indicated they would host a second annual Christmas invitational tournament in December 1965. Teams committed to participate were Hartwick, Kenyon and Southwest Texas State. Le Moyne entered the tournament with a 3–0 record. In their semifinal game against Kenyon on December 29, 1965, Eric Pitman, who finished with 17 points, scored all the Dolphins' points during a 7–2 run that extended a 61–56 lead to 68–58. Pitman got the run started by cashing in a free throw, after he was fouled while hitting a layup. After Kenyon scored on a put-back, Pitman took a pass from Gary DeYulia and drove the lane for another layup. DeYulia, who led the Dolphins with 24 points, then blocked a Kenyon shot. Pitman picked up the loose ball and raced down the floor for a basket, and Le Moyne was on its way to an 84–73 victory.

In the tournament final the following evening, the Dolphins met Hartwick, a team that had beaten them twice during the previous season, including a game at the Le Moyne Athletic Center in the NCAA tournament. Neither team had a lead larger than six points, and the game went down to the wire. Eric Pitman scored to tie the game at 51 with 2:12 to play. After the Warriors turned the ball over on a three-second violation, Pitman missed a driving layup, and Hartwick grabbed the rebound. With just 24 seconds to play, Dan Parham, who had a game-high 19 points and was named tournament MVP, was fouled. Parham missed the first free throw but made the second to give Hartwick a 52–51 lead. DeYulia's shot from the left of the key was off the mark, but he snatched his own rebound near the foul line and hit a jump shot with one second on the clock to give the Dolphins a 53–52 victory. Tom Mullen led Le Moyne with 15 points, and DeYulia added 13.

Gary DeYulia scored 26 points, shooting 12 for 15 from the floor, and Tom Mullen had a double-double with 24 points and 10 rebounds to lead the Dolphins to an 83–71 home victory over Iona on January 29, 1966. Le Moyne dominated the board by a 44–30 margin. The win was Le Moyne's sixth straight and 42nd all time in games against University Division opponents. The Dolphins improved to 8–1 overall and 2–0 in MECAA play.

The only blemish on Le Moyne's 1965–66 conference slate was a February 4 loss at Saint Peter's, 92–72. Tom Mullen and Gerry Glose each scored 17 points to lead the Dolphins. However, the Peacocks went 5–0 in MECAA play to take the league title.

Gary DeYulia's basket in the final minute of regulation tied the Dolphins' February 5 game at St. Francis (NY) and sent it to overtime. DeYulia finished the game with 24 points, including 14 in the second half and four more in overtime, and Le Moyne completed their comeback from a 10-point deficit, overcoming the Terriers for a 75–71 victory. The win improved the Dolphins to 9–2 overall and 3–1 in MECAA play and was their 43rd all-time over a University Division/major program.

With the expansion of the 1966 NCAA tournament to provide more at-large bids for schools in the northeast, the Northeast Region had eight teams divided into two divisions. Le Moyne was selected to host the four games in Section B of the Northeast Region. However, as of the time Le Moyne was chosen as host, the Dolphins had not yet been extended a bid to play in the tournament. Le Moyne agreed to host regardless of whether it was participating. After impressive wins over King's and Saint Michael's, Le Moyne, with a record of 12–4, accepted an invitation to the NCAA tournament.

Le Moyne lost their first-round game to Philadelphia Textile, 83–61. Gary DeYulia led the Dolphins with 26 points.

Le Moyne salvaged their consolation game against Potsdam State, 86–63. Paul Zajac of Philadelphia Textile was named most valuable player of the Northeast Region Section B. Gary DeYulia had 25 points in the consolation game, giving him 51 for the two tournament games, and was named a Northeast Region Section B All-Star.

After the tournament, the Dolphins closed the regular-season with an 88–72 home victory over Siena to finish 16–6. Gary DeYulia had a game-high 23 points in his final collegiate contest. DeYulia finished his career with 1,212 points, second on Le Moyne' all-time scoring list.

Gary DeYulia was named 1966 MECAA player of the year. Tom Mullen was selected second-team all-MECAA. DeYulia was also named to the first-team small Catholic college all-America squad and to the small college all-America team and received honorable mention on the Little All-America squad.

== See also ==
- History of Le Moyne Dolphins men's basketball (1960–1963)
- History of Le Moyne Dolphins men's basketball (1966–1969)
