= History of Le Moyne Dolphins men's basketball (1960–1963) =

NCAA Division I men's basketball team representing Le Moyne College

The history of Le Moyne Dolphins men's basketball from 1960 to 1963 includes the Dolphins' championship at the 1960 Middle Eastern College Athletic Association (MECAA) Invitational Tournament and the opening of their on-campus home venue, now known as the Le Moyne Events Center. The Dolphins won their third MECAA championship in 1962, when Bill Stanley became the first Le Moyne player to win a conference player of the year award.

== MECAA tournament title (1960–1961) ==
The 1960–61 Dolphins lost only one player from the previous season's starting lineup, but that player was captain Dick Lynch, among the best players in the program's history. Seniors Tommy Burns, Chuck Sammons, Frank Graziadei and Dave Rose and juniors John Caveny, Bill Stanley, Bill Ray and Joe Costello returned. Stars from the previous season's freshman team expected to contribute to the varsity squad included Mickey Flynn, Jim Downey, Chris Pitman, Bob Yahn and Mike Skinner. Practices opened on October 17, at Grant Junior High School and moved to the West Jefferson Street Armory in November. Burns and Sammons were elected co-captains.

After the Dolphins won their December 3 season opener, 77–63, at home over St. Lawrence, the Green and Gold hosted Cortland State on December 7. John Caveny had a double-double, scoring a game-high 23 points while collecting 11 rebounds, to lead Le Moyne to a 73–57 victory, the 22nd consecutive home triumph for the Dolphins. Caveny shot 8 for 14 from the field and compiled his numbers despite sitting out about 10 minutes of the second half in foul trouble. With the game tied at 18, Le Moyne went on a 7–0 run, getting points from Caveny, Tommy Burns and Chuck Sammons, who was playing through the effects of a virus, and controlled the game the rest of the way. Bill Stanley also had a double-double for the Dolphins with 11 points and 12 rebounds despite fouling out in the second half. Le Moyne shot 45% from the floor while holding the Red Dragons to a 33% success rate.

Le Moyne's archrival, Siena, reclassified to the College Division for the 1960–61 season, and the rivalry was renewed on December 10, in Loudonville in the Middle Eastern College Athletic Association (MECAA) season opener for both clubs. Bill Stanley's double-double, scoring a game-high 15 points on 4-for-7 shooting and grabbing a team-high 13 rebounds led the Dolphins to a 49–45 road victory. Le Moyne had an eight-point edge at halftime and never surrendered the lead in the second half. However, the Indians pulled within one point with 1:28 to play. Stanley responded with a basket on the Dolphins' next possession. After Le Moyne got a defensive stop, Chuck Sammons hit a pair of free throws to put the game away.

Bill Stanley set a new program record, when he snared 20 rebounds in the Dolphins' 82–68 win at King's on December 16. Stanley also had a game-high 32 points to complete a double-double.

Up until the 1959–60 season, some MECAA teams had not played full round-robin conference schedules, and others played each conference opponent with home-and-home series versus some but not all league members. The uneven scheduling created controversy about which team deserved the championship in cases where it had been decided in favor of a team that had scheduled one extra or one fewer game, since the conference title was awarded based on winning percentage against conference opponents. St. Francis (NY) had won the 1955–56 conference championship with a 4–1 record, while both Le Moyne and St. Bonaventure finished 4–2. In both 1959 and 1960, Saint Peter's had a conference record of 3–1, one-half game behind the MECAA champions each year. In part to address this perceived inequity, the MECAA staged an invitational tournament in December 1960, which was originally planned to be held annually to determine a champion with all conference teams on equal footing. The MECAA had six members at the time: Le Moyne, St. Francis (NY), Iona, King's, Saint Peter's and Siena. King's was not eligible for the 1960–61 regular-season MECAA championship, since the Monarchs joined the conference in June 1960, and were able to schedule only three games against MECAA members for their initial season in the league; King's did not participate in the 1960 MECAA tournament. In order to create an eight-team bracket and ensure the tournament champion would need to win three games, three other teams (Fairleigh Dickinson, Long Island and Wagner) were invited. Siena's reclassification to the College Division left the MECAA with two University Division teams (St. Francis (NY) and Iona) and four College Division teams (Le Moyne, Siena, Saint Peter's and King's).

The Dolphins drew host Saint Peter's in the MECAA tournament quarterfinal at the Jersey City Armory. Le Moyne entered the game 5–0 on the season, and the Peacocks were riding a six-game winning steak. In a game that was tight throughout, Saint Peter's took a 62–61 lead with 1:06 to play. A put-back of an offensive rebound by sophomore reserve Chris Pitman, who replaced Chuck Sammons after the latter fouled out early in the second half, with 20 seconds to go gave the Dolphins a 63–62 lead. After an empty possession for the Peacocks, Bill Stanley, who had a game-high 22 points and added 13 rebounds, stretched Le Moyne's lead to two points with a free throw with four seconds on the clock. Saint Peter's got off a long shot at the buzzer, but it missed, and Le Moyne held on for a 64–62 victory. The Peacocks' loss, which sent them to the consolation bracket in their on-campus gym, spoiled the chances for the MECAA tournament to be a financial success.

The second-half rebounding work of John Caveney and Chuck Sammons allowed Le Moyne to pull away from Iona, after leading by just four points at the break, and cruise to a 90–60 victory. Caveney led the Dolphins with 25 points on 10-for-22 shooting. Tom Burns had 15 points, and Bill Stanley added 14 for Le Moyne, who outscored the Gaels 54–28 in the second half. This was Le Moyne's fourth straight win in games against University Division opponents and their 33rd all-time victory over a University Division/major program.

Le Moyne earned a wire-to-wire 66–57 win over Long Island to claim the MECAA tournament title on December 29, 1960. After trailing by 13 points at intermission, the Blackbirds were unable to trim the deficit to any fewer than six points in the second half. John Caveny scored a game-high 20 points for the Dolphins. Bill Stanley had 18 points and 17 rebounds and was named the tournament most valuable player. Each player on Le Moyne's roster received a watch to commemorate the tournament triumph. Le Moyne fans greeted the victorious Dolphins when they arrived at the New York Central Railroad Passenger Station in Syracuse.

Despite the initial plans, the 1960 MECAA tournament was the only one the league ever held. The tournament was unique, since it could be differentiated from a conference tournament, because it was not held at the end of the season and included non-member teams. It also does not resemble an in-season multiple-team event, since five of the six MECAA teams participated rather than limiting tournament entries to one team per conference.

Off to an undefeated 8–0 start and riding a 22-game home winning streak, Le Moyne was stunned at home, 83–68, by Saint Anselm, the team that eliminated the Dolphins from the 1960 NCAA tournament, on January 6, 1961. The Dolphins' previous home loss had been a 65–50 drubbing at the hands of St. Bonaventure on February 5, 1958. After a spurt early in the second half gave Le Moyne a 37–35 lead, Saint Anselm broke the game open with red hot shooting. The Hawks hit 52% of their shots from the floor for the game, while Le Moyne shot 47%. Tom Burns scored 20 points, and Chuck Sammons had a double-double with 12 points and 10 rebounds for the Dolphins. Bill Stanley scored nine points and grabbed 12 rebounds for Le Moyne, but he fell hard to the floor, landing on the base of his spine, trying to block a shot and was unable to play the final four minutes.

In early January, Le Moyne was ranked no. 13 in the country among all Catholic schools. This ranking included both University Division and College Division institutions. However, the Dolphins fell out of the rankings after the loss to Saint Anselm. Bill Stanley was still suffering from a bad bruise on his lower back the day before the Dolphins' next game at Cortland State, and his status was uncertain. Mickey Flynn also suffered an injury against Saint Anselm, and his knee was too swollen to play against Cortland State. Stanley played most of the game against the Red Dragons on January 10, and put up a double-double with 10 points and 14 rebounds in a 67–55 Dolphins victory. John Caveny scored 23 points to lead the Dolphins. Bill Ray also had a double-double for Le Moyne, scoring 11 points and grabbing 11 boards.

Mickey Flynn, still nursing a knee injury, was the only one of the 13 players on Le Moyne's roster who did not make the trip for the Dolphins' January 14 game at Clarkson. All twelve players who travelled with the team scored in an 80–46 romp over the Golden Knights. The Dolphins broke open a game that was close midway through the first half and claimed a 43–21 lead at intermission. Tom Burns scored 16 points to lead Le Moyne. Bill Stanley, still bothered by a bruised lower back and blisters on his feet, played only 15 minutes and scored six points while collecting a team-high nine rebounds. John Caveny scored 10 points in the first half and did not re-enter the game after the break. The win improved the Dolphins' record to 10–1 on the season.

Bill Stanley grabbed 22 rebounds to break his own program record and scored a game-high 24 points, but it was not enough for the Dolphins as they fell, 73–69, at Buffalo State on February 2. The game was tight, until Le Moyne's offense sputtered after point guard Tom Burns fouled out with five minutes to play. Le Moyne's second straight loss dropped their record to 10–3 in collegiate contests.

Bill Stanley had a double-double with 16 points and 11 rebounds to lead the Dolphins to an 86–65 win at Ithaca on February 8. Le Moyne used a zone press defense to frustrate the Bombers and build a 10-point halftime lead. Ithaca tried a press of their own in the second half, but it was broken repeatedly under the floor leadership of point guard Tom Burns, who scored 17 points to pace the Dolphins' balanced attack. Le Moyne capitalized on Ithaca's defensive gamble and converted fast-break opportunities into baskets that swelled their lead. Sophomore Bob Hunt made his varsity debut and scored four points. The Dolphins improved to 11–3 in collegiate contests.

John Caveny scored 16 points to lead the Dolphins to a 60–48 home victory over Hobart on February 18. Le Moyne had a 12–0 run early in the game to take a 15–3 lead before slowing down the tempo. It took Hobart's Jim Upper, who entered the game with a scoring average of over 25 points per game, 15 minutes to score his first basket, his only field goal of the first half. Upper finished with 14 points. Although the Dolphins shot only 32% from the floor, the Statesmen were unable to capitalize against Le Moyne's defense. The Dolphins' leading scorer, Bill Stanley was held without a field goal and finished with only five points. He was bothered by blisters on his feet and did not play the final 15 minutes of the game. None of Le Moyne's starters played during the final 10 minutes. Le Moyne's Chris Pitman was stricken with pleurisy and did not dress for the game. The win improved the Dolphins' record to 14–3 in collegiate contests, and they also had an exhibition victory over Stewart Air Force Base.

The Dolphins needed a home win over Saint Peter's on February 20, to remain in the MECAA regular-season title race and improve their chances at getting an NCAA tournament bid. The Peacocks used hot shooting to get an early jump on the Dolphins and claimed a 23–14 lead out of the gate. However, Le Moyne closed the half on a 22–13 run, capped by Bill Stanley's buzzer-beating jump shot, to tie the game at 36 at intermission. The Dolphins took their only lead of the game at 40–38 early in the second half, on a Tom Burns jumper. Saint Peter's embarked on an 11–1 run that gave them a 49–41 lead with 12 minutes to play. The Dolphins battled back, but Pete Norton's basket, the final field goal of the game for Saint Peter's, gave the Peacocks a six-point lead with six minutes on the clock. One more furious push from the Dolphins, led by Burns, Chuck Sammons and John Caveny, as Saint Peter's was trying to freeze the ball, got Le Moyne within striking distance. A pair of free throws by Bill Ray cut the deficit to 62–61 with 1:10 remaining. Burns had asked the referee for a timeout, if the second free throw was good. The referee appeared to blow his whistle, but he was quoted by Le Moyne head coach Tommy Niland as having said, "Nobody heard it but me and the kid." Saint Peter's inbounded the ball, and Le Moyne, not yet in the penalty, fouled to stop the clock. Burns argued with the official and was called for a technical foul. Bill Smith, who finished with a game-high 26 points, hit both free throws with 45 seconds to play to increase the Peacocks' lead to three points. Le Moyne then fouled Smith, and he hit two more free throws to extend the lead to five. After an empty possession for Le Moyne, two more free throws secured a 69–61 win for Saint Peter's. Sammons scored 18 points to lead the Dolphins. Stanley, who finished with 11 points, was bothered by both blisters on his feet and the flu, and Mickey Flynn substituted for him for a few stretches. The other four Le Moyne starters, Burns, Sammons, Caveny and Ray, each played the entire 40 minutes. The loss dropped the Dolphins to 14–4 in collegiate contests and 1–2 in MECAA play, eliminating them from conference title contention.

Bill Stanley's battle with blisters on his feet evolved into an infection that kept him out of the Dolphins' 80–50 loss at NIT-bound Providence on February 23. Tom Burns scored 15 points to lead Le Moyne in the losing effort. Bob Yahn replaced Stanley in the starting lineup and scored six points. Yahn was effective on the defensive end of the floor, holding Friars star Jim Hadnot to just eight points. Head coach Tommy Niland announced that Providence had agreed to be Le Moyne's first opponent when its new on-campus fieldhouse opens in February 1962. Upon making the announcement, Niland said, "Syracusans are sure to see a tremendous team. They've got a freshman there named John Thompson from Washington, D.C., who is the greatest frosh player I've seen. He stands 6-8 and is so smooth and graceful for his size that he looks like another Elgin Baylor or Oscar Robertson. They'll have Jim Hadnot back, and he's 6-10, and they've got plenty of other good players besides."

The Dolphins overcame a sluggish start to win their home finale, 72–69, over King's on February 28. The Monarchs controlled the boards and took an early 23–13 lead, before the hot shooting of John Caveny and Tom Burns cut the deficit to seven points, 33–26, at halftime. Less than five minutes into the second half, a 13–4 run sparked by Mickey Flynn, who finished with 14 points, gave the Dolphins the lead. Le Moyne's lead grew as large as seven points, but King's continued battling and trailed by only three points in the final minute, when Caveny's basket created some breathing room. After the Monarchs scored another basket, Caveny hit a pair of free throws to put the game away. Seniors Frank Graziadei and Dave Rose entered the game with 12 seconds remaining, substituting for seniors Burns and Chuck Sammons, who received an ovation from the crowd. All four were playing the final home game of their collegiate careers. Caveny scored 19 points to lead the Dolphins. Bill Stanley missed his third straight game with an infected foot, and Chris Pitman was out for the fifth game in a row with pleurisy. The win improved the Dolphins to 16–5 in collegiate contests and kept them in contention for a berth in the NCAA tournament.

Le Moyne suffered a crushing 103–58 defeat at Gannon on March 2, that likely ended their hopes for an NCAA tournament berth. The Golden Knights took control of the game from the start and built a 32–16 lead. The Dolphins got no closer than 10 points down the rest of the way. Bill Ray scored 14 points to lead Le Moyne. Senior Dave Rose got more playing time than usual and finished with eight points. Bill Stanley and Chris Pitman were still sidelined with injury and illness and did not make the trip.

The Dolphins ended their season with an 82–62 loss at Steubenville on March 3. Two quick baskets by Bob Yahn and another by Chuck Sammons helped Le Moyne build a 6–1 lead in the opening minutes. After the Barons went on a 7–0 run to take the lead, Tommy Burns scored a basket to tie the game at 8. Steubenville responded with a 17–6 run and dominated the fatigued Dolphins the rest of the way. Tommy Burns scored 18 points on 8-for-14 shooting to lead Le Moyne.

The MECAA awarded its regular-season championship for the 1960–61 season to the team with the best winning percentage against conference opponents, excluding games played during the Christmas tournament. The title was again decided by the result of an extra game. The final game of the season on the league slate matched Iona and Siena on March 4. Iona and Saint Peter's were tied for first place at 3–1, and Saint Peter's had already completed their MECAA schedule. Siena's upset victory over Iona, who had given Saint Peter's their only conference loss, dropped the Gaels' record to 3–2 and gave the Peacocks the MECAA championship. Had Le Moyne defeated Saint Peter's on February 21, the Dolphins would have won their third straight MECAA crown. Instead, Le Moyne finished in third place at 2–2.

The losses of Bill Stanley, the team's leading scorer and rebounder at the time of his injury, and Chris Pitman, a key rotation player off the bench, was too much for the Dolphin to overcome down the stretch, and they lost four of their final six games, finishing 16–7 in collegiate contests.

Le Moyne's Bill Stanley was unanimously named a 1961 MECAA All-Star. John Caveny and Tom Burns were named second-team MECAA All-Stars.

== Third regular-season MECAA title (1961–1962) ==
Bill Stanley and John Caveny returned to the Dolphins for their senior seasons in 1961–62, and were named co-captains. The previous season's co-captains, Tommy Burns and Chuck Sammons, were lost to graduation as were reserves Dave Rose and Frank Graziadei. Juniors Bob Yahn, Jim Downey, Bob Hunt and Mickey Flynn all returned to the team. Senior Bill Ray and junior Chris Pitman were academically ineligible for at least the fall semester. New sophomores added to the Dolphins' roster were Ralph Yahn, younger brother of Bob, Tom Cooney, Dick Myers, John McGrath, Frank Shortt, Jim Kennedy, Tom Galton and Jim Martin. Senior Joe Costello ended his collegiate playing career to become head coach of Le Moyne's freshman basketball team. The Dolphins had anticipated moving into their newly constructed fieldhouse during the 1961–62 season, with their February 5 game against Providence the target for the opening of the venue. However, by November 1961, construction delays made it apparent that this would not happen, and Le Moyne played all their home games at the West Jefferson Street Armory.

During the offseason, Dolphins head coach Tommy Niland was elected president of the MECAA.

Starting with the 1961–62 season, the MECAA began to play a round-robin schedule with each team playing one conference game against each other member. If conference members scheduled more than one game against each other, one game was designated in advance as the game that would count in the conference standings. This system continued for the remainder of the MECAA's existence, except for a few instances in which conference games could not be scheduled or needed to be cancelled.

John Caveny, Bill Stanley, Mickey Flynn, Ralph Yahn and Tom Cooney were named as the Dolphins' starters prior to the season opener.

A fiercely contested 61–58 overtime win at home against Iona on January 27, 1962, gave the Dolphins an 8–2 record and put them in first place in the MECAA with a 2–0 league mark. The Gaels had control of the game until the middle stage of the second half, when Le Moyne went on a run sparked by the pressure defense applied by Tom Cooney and the scoring of Bill Stanley. With the score tied at 54 late in regulation, the Dolphins went into a deep freeze, holding the ball for the final shot. John Caveny's layup was blocked by Jim O'Donnell, sending the game to overtime. A Stanley jump shot, after retrieving a jump ball, with a minute and a half to play in the extra session put Le Moyne in front, 60–58. After a missed jump shot by Iona, the Dolphins collected the rebound with one minute on the clock and froze the ball. The Gaels fouled with five seconds to go, and Stanley hit a free throw to complete the scoring. Stanley and Mickey Flynn each had 18 points to lead the Dolphins. Le Moyne reserve John McGrath missed the game with strep throat. This was Le Moyne's 34th all-time victory over a University Division/major program.

A week later, the Dolphins suffered their first home loss of the season, a 59–52 defeat at the hands of Gannon, despite 18 points from Bill Stanley and 16 from John Caveny. Le Moyne trailed most of the second half but cut the Golden Knights' lead to 50–48 inside the final two minutes. Al Lawson's tip-in extended Gannon's lead and put the game out of reach. Bill Stanley scored 18 points to lead the Dolphins. Chris Pitman made his season debut after overcoming academic ineligibility and scored seven points.

Two days later, the Dolphins hosted reigning NIT champion Providence in a game that was originally planned to celebrate the grand opening of Le Moyne's new fieldhouse. Bob Yahn, starting for the first time this season, did an admirable job rebounding with Providence stars 6'10" Jim Hadnot and 6'10 1/2" John Thompson, and Le Moyne's defense swarmed around the Friars' big men. Tom Cooney's ball hawking on Providence point guard Vinny Ernst, the 1961 NIT MVP, was disruptive and kept the Dolphins in the game. After Le Moyne started hot and raced to an early 10–0 lead, Providence did not find themselves in front until 17 minutes into the game and held a slim two-point edge at the break. The Friars used a pressing defense to open the second half with an 8–0 run and extend their lead to 10 points. The Dolphins were unable to get back into the game the rest of the way, falling 53–46. Despite their defensive efforts, Le Moyne was unable to stop Ray Flynn, who had 22 points on 10-for-16 shooting from the floor for Providence. Bill Stanley scored 19 points to lead the Dolphins.

Sophomore Ralph Yahn missed Le Moyne's 75–69 win at St. Lawrence on February 7, with an infected heel. John Caveny scored 21 points to lead the Dolphins, who improved to 9–4.

After being held scoreless in the first half, which ended with the teams tied at 32, Bill Stanley exploded for 17 second-half points to lead the Dolphins to a 73–69 victory at St. Francis (NY) on February 10. Dick Myers had a double-double with 13 points and 14 rebounds. John Caveny had a game-high 25 points for Le Moyne. The Dolphins improved to 10–5 overall and moved into first place in the MECAA with a 3–1 record in league play. This was Le Moyne's 35th all-time win over a University Division/major program.

By the time Le Moyne dropped a 64–62 overtime decision at home to Saint Michael's on February 17, which left the Dolphins with an 11–6 record, hopes for an NCAA tournament berth had faded. Mickey Flynn had a chance to win the game for the Dolphins at the end of regulation, but he was closely guarded by Al Baldini, and his shot at the buzzer missed. With the score tied at 62 in the closing seconds of overtime, John Caveny drove to the basket and was called for a charging foul. Ed McDonnell hit a pair of free throws, and the Dolphins could not get off a final shot. Bill Stanley scored 22 points to lead Le Moyne.

Despite their late-season struggles, the Dolphins continued to play well in MECAA games and had an opportunity to clinch at least share of the league title, if they could get a home victory over King's on March 2. Bill Stanley and John Caveny exploded for 30 and 27 points, respectively, to lead Le Moyne to an 83–51 romp over King's and guarantee the Dolphins no worse than a tie for the MECAA championship with a 4–1 league record. Leading by seven points at the break, Le Moyne started the second half with a 14–6 run to push their bulge to 15 points. By the midpoint of the second half, the Dolphins held a 66–38 lead over the Monarchs. With no doubt remaining about the outcome, Stanley, playing his final collegiate game, reached a career total of 999 points. The crowd of 1,100 fans was breathless as Stanley went to the line and missed both free throws with 7:30 to play. Two minutes later, Stanley was fouled again; this time, he hit both free throws to become the seventh player in program history to break through the 1,000-point barrier. Earlier in the season, Caveny had also topped 1,000 points in the Dolphins' 70–59 loss at Catholic on February 22, and he finished his career with 1,069 points. Ralph Yahn had a strong game, finishing with 10 points and 11 rebounds. Stanley had 11 rebounds to go with his point total.

After completing their season with a 13–9 overall record, the Dolphins became spectators, and the team to watch was archrival Siena. The Indians won their ninth straight game, a streak which included a March 6 non-conference victory at Le Moyne, when they routed Saint Peter's, 77–54, in their home finale. The loss eliminated the Peacocks from contention for the MECAA title. Siena was the last remaining MECAA team with only one loss and could claim a share of the MECAA championship with a win at Iona on March 10. Coincidentally, Iona had been denied the MECAA title the previous season, when the Gaels were upset at Siena in their season finale. Iona got its revenge, beating the Indians, 73–59, to give Le Moyne the outright MECAA championship.

The MECAA named Bill Stanley 1962 most valuable player and Tommy Niland coach of the year. It was the first time a Le Moyne player had earned a conference MVP award and the third MECAA coach of the year honor for Niland. It was Stanley's second straight MECAA All-Star selection. John Caveny was named to the MECAA All-Star second team.

== Dolphins get a new home (1962–1963) ==
By September 1962, the construction of Le Moyne's new fieldhouse was completed. Initially, the building was referred to as the Le Moyne Athletic Center.

Seniors Mickey Flynn and Chris Pitman were named co-captains of the 1962–63 team. The Dolphins lost their previous season's co-captains, John Caveny, who was second-team all-conference, and MECAA MVP Bill Stanley to graduation, but several rotation players returned, including senior Bob Yahn and juniors Ralph Yahn, Dick Myers, Tom Cooney and John McGrath. Seniors Jim Downey and Bob Hunt were impressive in preseason practices and were expected to get significant playing time. Sophomores Dick Reece, Dick Martyns, Dan Frawley and Mike Downey, younger brother of Jim, were added to the team with Reece and Martyns competing for starting roles.

The first intercollegiate contest in the new Le Moyne Athletic Center was the Dolphins' season opener against their archrival and MECAA opponent, Siena, on December 1, 1962. A crowd of 2,100 witnessed the return of former Le Moyne moderator of athletics, Rev. Vincent B. Ryan, S.J., who was on hand to throw out the first ball in a pre-game ceremony. John McGrath, who finished with a game-high 19 points, hit a jump shot to give Le Moyne a 2–0 lead and score the first points in a varsity game in the new arena. The Dolphins' pressure defense, led by Tom Cooney, forced Siena into turnovers and fueled the offense, putting Le Moyne in front, 23–15 at the half.

During the intermission, Rev. John J. O'Brien, S.J., who was the current moderator of athletics, introduced Le Moyne's first team, which played Siena in the program's inaugural game in 1948, former team captains and members of the Dolphins' 1,000 career points club. Former players on hand for the festivities included Don Savage, Lou Donahue, Joe Boehm, Bob Hurley, Dave Lozo, Dick Riley, Patsy Leo, Len Mowins, Dick Kenyon, Ron Mack, Denny Morissey, Dick Lynch, John Caveney and Bill Stanley. Syracuse mayor William Walsh was also present.

When the action resumed, the Indians came out flying, opening the second half with a 10–2 run to erase Le Moyne's lead and tie the game at 25 in only five minutes. Siena extended the run to 18–5 to push ahead, 33–28. Midway through the second half, Dick Myers fouled out, the Dolphins trailed 37–33, and Siena appeared to have the momentum. The Indians answered each of Le Moyne's next two baskets with one of their own and led, 41–37, with 3:14 to play. John McGrath drew a foul and hit both free throws to cut Siena's lead to two points. After an empty Indians possession, Chris Pitman was fouled and knocked down both shots to tie the game at 41 with just over two minutes to play. Siena's Paul Thorpe missed a layup inside the 1:50 mark, and Pitman grabbed the rebound. The Dolphins froze the ball, holding for the final shot, until Mickey Flynn's 12-footer from the left side fell through the hoop with five seconds left, giving Le Moyne a 6–0 run and a 43–41 lead. The Indians' final desperation shot was blocked by the Dolphins, sealing the Le Moyne victory. Flynn finished the game with nine points.

The Dolphins' first four games of the 1962–63 season were at home, and Le Moyne won all four. The Dolphins opened the road portion of their schedule with another victory, 74–66, over MECAA rival King's on December 14, to improve to 5–0 overall and 2–0 in conference games. Mickey Flynn scored 25 points on 9-for-17 shooting and grabbed eight rebounds to lead the Dolphins. The Dolphins' first loss of the season came the following evening at Scranton, 74–50. The Dolphins were outrebounded, 43–30, and spent much of the game with three starters in foul trouble. Tom Cooney scored 11 points to lead Le Moyne. Jim Downey, who had been starting at guard for the Dolphins, missed the game with an ankle injury.

After a holiday break of more than two weeks, the Dolphins returned to action on their home floor on January 5, 1963, and defeated Hartwick, 54–50, in overtime, keeping their record on their new court unblemished at 5–0. Trailing by four points with 3:12 to play in regulation, the Dolphins scored the game's next two baskets, both on offensive rebounds Chris Pitman converted to layups. Le Moyne got possession with the score tied and 46 seconds left and held for the last shot, but Mickey Flynn's attempt bounced off the rim. A three-point play by Pitman gave the Dolphins a 53–50 lead in overtime, and they held the Statesmen without a basket on only two attempts the rest of the way. Le Moyne outrebounded Hartwick, 56–47, despite the Statesmen having an edge on the boards in the first half. Flynn scored 15 points to lead the Dolphins despite sitting out much of the second half in foul trouble. Sophomore Dick Martyns grabbed nine rebounds and scored the first four points of his varsity career.

In a battle for first place in the MECAA, the Dolphins, sparked by the hot shooting of Dick Myers, hit 10 of their first 15 shots to build a nine-point lead over Saint Peter's on January 12. However, after Myers was called for his third personal foul midway through the first half, the Peacocks immediately responded with a 9–0 run to tie the game at 25, and trailed by only two points at intermission. After Chris Pitman drew his fourth personal foul early in the second half, Saint Peter's took control of the game and cruised to a 66–59 victory, handing the Dolphins their first loss on their new home court. Myers had 19 points to lead Le Moyne. The Dolphins suffered their second straight loss and fell to 6–3 overall and 2–1 in MECAA play.

The Dolphins' mid-season losing streak reached five games and dropped their record to 6–6. In the final game of the streak on January 27, the Dolphins fell behind, 49–33, early in the second half at Saint Michael's before going on a 12–0 run, which they extended to 18–3, to cut the lead to 52–51. However, the Knights outscored Le Moyne, 22–5, over the final 10 minutes to secure a 74–56 win. Mickey Flynn and Ralph Yahn each scored 14 points to lead Le Moyne.

Le Moyne broke their losing streak with an impressive home win over St. Francis (NY), a team that would end up playing in the NIT, on February 2, 1963. Although the Terriers never led in the game, the Dolphins were unable to hold the 10-point halftime lead they built with pressure defense, transition baskets and outside shooting. St. Francis applied pressure defense of their own in the second half and forced turnovers. The Dolphins began to shoot poorly from the free-throw line. Suddenly, a game that seemed well in hand for Le Moyne was tied at 50 with five minutes to play. In the closing moments of regulation, with the score tied at 56, Mickey Flynn, who finished with a game-high 20 points, missed a potential game winner, sending the game to overtime. Flynn redeemed himself with two straight jump shots early in the extra session to give the Dolphins a four-point lead. The Terriers fouled to regain possession, and Le Moyne recovered their free-throw shooting touch, scoring their final five points from the charity stripe, the final two scored by Ralph Yahn, who had a strong rebounding game despite playing with four fouls in the late stages. Two late Terriers baskets came after the game was out of reach, and the Dolphins earned a 65–64 victory. The Dolphins played without Dick Myers, who missed his second straight game with a back injury. Le Moyne improved to 7–6 overall and 3–1 in MECAA play with the win, the 36th in their history over a University Division/major program.

The opportunity to win a second straight MECAA title slipped away, when the Dolphins lost, 57–51, at Iona on February 9. The Gaels raced to an early 12–0 lead and never looked back. Mickey Flynn scored 15 points to lead Le Moyne, who fell to 9–7 in collegiate contests and 3–2 in MECAA play.

The Dolphins finished the 1962–63 season with a 12–10 record in collegiate contests. Mickey Flynn was named All-MECAA first team.

== See also ==
- History of Le Moyne Dolphins men's basketball (1958–1960)
- History of Le Moyne Dolphins men's basketball (1963–1966)
