= History of Le Moyne Dolphins men's basketball (1979–1983) =

NCAA Division I men's basketball team representing Le Moyne College

The history of Le Moyne Dolphins men's basketball from 1979 to 1983 includes the head coaching reign of Mike Lee. His inaugural season was the worst in the history of Le Moyne men's basketball, and the Dolphins repeated the feat with an even worse season in Lee's sophomore campaign. Le Moyne's final season under Lee was their best during his tenure. Players recruited by Lee, including Wright Lassiter, Paul Galvin and Bobby Chestnut, would go on to play keys roles in more successful Dolphin teams after Lee's departure.

== Orangeman takes the helm for the Green and Gold (1979–1980) ==
The coaching tenure of Mike Lee, a former three-year starter and captain of the Syracuse Orangemen, began with the loss of five seniors to graduation: Jene Grey, Tom Fletcher, Mike Ruff, Dan Fiaschetti and Matt Wadach. Jim Maney was the only senior returning to the team. The starting duo of McDermott brothers, junior Jim and sophomore Mike, returned. Redshirt sophomore Frank Cooper, who missed the previous season with a severe back injury, and junior reserve Joe Fletcher were also back along with sophomores Dave Hart and Chris LaCombe. Dan Fletcher, a 6'2" sophomore, regarded by Lee as a good shooter and the team's best defensive player, was elevated from the junior varsity squad. Junior 6'5" transfer Danny Kempf had to wait until January, to satisfy NCAA transfer rules. New recruits included 6'4" forward Joe Nowak, a strong inside player, and 6'2" guard John Miranda. As a high school senior, Miranda's buzzer beater clinched the section championship for Newark High School, advancing them to the New York state tournament, where they were defeated by Nowak's Lackawanna High School. Two other freshmen, Dennis Fleming, a 5'10" guard, described by Lee as the team's best shooting backcourt player, and 6'8" Pete Constandy, a good outside shooter, also joined the team. John Leone, formerly head coach at Nottingham High School, was hired as an assistant coach.

Starting with the 1979–80 academic year, Le Moyne increased the number of athletic scholarships offered by the school (for all sports) from six to eight.

After opening the season with a blowout loss at Boston College, Mike Lee got his first win as head coach in dramatic fashion in the Dolphins home opener against Ithaca on December 4, 1979. With Le Moyne trailing by five points in the final minute, the Dolphins were inspired by the mocking hand-clapping of Ithaca guard George Piniella, which led to some shoving between Piniella and Jim McDermott. McDermott's brother, Mike, drove to the basket and scored with 16 seconds to play, cutting the Bombers' lead to three points. The Dolphins fouled Piniella, who missed the front end of a one-and-one two seconds later. Mike McDermott was fouled with 10 seconds on the clock and sank both free throws to bring Le Moyne within a point at 59–58. Piniella, who had become a villain in the eyes of Dolphin fans, was fouled again with seven seconds left. He hit the first shot but missed the second, and Dolphins freshman Joe Nowak was fouled collecting the rebound. Nowak hit the first free throw but missed the second. Mike McDermott collected the rebound and banked a soft fadeaway jump shot off the glass for a 61–60 Le Moyne victory. Mike McDermott scored eight points for the game, six of which came in the final 16 seconds. Jim McDermott and Dave Hart scored 14 points each to lead the Dolphins.

Dolphins head coach Mike Lee returned to his alma mater as Le Moyne met Syracuse, ranked no. 11 in the AP poll, in the opener of the Carrier Classic on December 7. Despite Jim McDermott's drive through the lane for a dunk on Roosevelt Bouie, the Orangemen easily handled the Dolphins, 107–61. Bouie and Louis Orr each scored 14 points to lead Syracuse. McDermott had a game-high 16 points for Le Moyne. The following evening, the Dolphins lost the consolation game to Hofstra, 75–64. McDermott and Dave Hart each scored 16 points to lead Le Moyne, and McDermott was named to the all-tournament team.

The Dolphins met Maryland Eastern Shore in the Loyola Tournament in Baltimore on January 3, 1980. After shooting poorly early in the game, Le Moyne got within three points in the final minute but were unable to force a turnover and committed a foul with one second to play. The Hawks hit their free throws to seal a 73–68 victory. Junior transfer Danny Kempf became eligible and made his season debut with a double double, scoring 13 points on 4-for-7 shooting and grabbing 13 rebounds. Mike McDermott had a game-high 20 points to lead the Dolphins. In the consolation game the following evening, the Dolphins let a five-point second-half lead slip away and missed four potential game-winning shots in the final 40 seconds, falling to Loyola Maryland, 62–61. Jim McDermott's basket in the final minute had put Le Moyne ahead, 61–60, but the Greyhounds raced down the floor and responded immediately with ago-ahead basket, before the Dolphins' scrambling finish came up short. Jim McDermott had a game-high 21 points and grabbed eight rebounds for Le Moyne and was named to the all-tournament team. Kempf had six points and eight rebounds for the Dolphins.

East Stroudsburg State avenged a road loss 11 days earlier, a game won by the Dolphins, 82–80, with a nine-point burst in the final minute capped by a 17-foot jumper from freshman Dennis Fleming with three seconds to play, when they won the opener of the Pocono Classic on their home floor, 88–76, on January 23. Mike McDermott and Dave Hart each scored 20 points to lead the Dolphins. Danny Kempf had a double-double with 10 points and 11 rebounds. The Dolphins fell to Hartwick, ranked no. 12 in Division II, 102–67 in the following evening's consolation game. Dave Hart scored 22 points to lead Le Moyne, which saw their record drop to 4–11.

Following the Dolphins' physical 70–66 home victory over Clarkson on February 12, police officers had to enter the court to separate the players, after a brawl broke out between the teams. The game featured 50 fouls, 25 assessed to each team. Dolphins freshman Joe Nowak was ejected in the first half for throwing the ball out of bounds toward a Clarkson player sitting on the bench. Clarkson's Andy Bright was ejected in the second half for his football-style tackle of Le Moyne's John Miranda. One Clarkson player confronted a Le Moyne priest during the melee. Both coaches expressed frustration at the quality of officiating. Dan Fletcher scored 13 points, all in the second half, for the Dolphins, who finished the game strong and erased an eight-point lead. Jim McDermott had 19 points to lead Le Moyne, which improved to 6–15 on the season.

Freshman John Miranda's layup at the buzzer sent the Dolphins' February 27 season finale at Cortland State into overtime with the score tied at 75. After the Dolphins scored first in the extra session, the Red Dragons took control and defeated Le Moyne 88–85. Jim McDermott scored 19 points to lead the Dolphins. The loss was the Le Moyne's fourth straight and dropped their record to 6–19, the worst in program history. The Dolphins were 0–11 on the road and 0–3 on neutral floors, the first time in program history Le Moyne was winless away from home. They had just four wins and five losses against Division III opponents and managed just two victories in 13 games with Division II foes.

== Another worst season in program history (1980–1981) ==
Jim Maney was the only player the Dolphins lost to graduation in 1980. Leading scorer Jim McDermott returned for his senior season. Senior Danny Kempf, Le Moyne's leading rebounder in the 1979–80 season, left the team on the advice of his doctors due to blood clots in his right leg. Juniors Mike McDermott, Chris LaCombe and Dan Fletcher and sophomores John Miranda, Joe Nowak and Dennis Fleming all returned. Nowak was ineligible for the season's first five games as a penalty for playing in an unauthorized summer league. Junior Jim Grabowski, who saw a little varsity action the previous season but primarily played junior varsity, was added to the squad. Junior transfer Jim Morrissey made the team as a walk-on. Freshman Paul Galvin, a 5'11" guard, was expected to get playing time running the point. Other freshmen added to the team were Mark Prechtl, a 6'4" forward from Jamestown High School, and Mike Leithead, a 6'5" center from Philadelphia, both of whom head coach Mike Lee thought would see action immediately. A fourth freshman, Greg Martin, a 6'0" guard, tore cartilage in his knee in training camp, forcing him to miss the entire season. During the season, Galvin established himself as the starting point guard. Jim McDermott continued in his role as team captain for a second year. For the first time in program history, the Dolphins' 1980–81 schedule did not include any Division I opponents. Previously, Le Moyne had faced at least two top-tier foes in each season.

After starting the season 1–3, the Dolphins lost their opening game in the Assumption College Classic to host Assumption on December 12, 1980, 70–63. Le Moyne had a one-point lead with four minutes to play, but the Greyhounds closed the game on a 9–1 run to secure the victory. Freshman Mark Prechtl scored 18 points and grabbed eight rebounds to lead the Dolphins. The Dolphins defeated Adelphi, 74–70, in the consolation game the following evening. Joe Nowak made his season debut, having finished serving his five-game suspension, and had 20 points and nine rebounds for Le Moyne.

The Dolphins lost their opening game in the Yellow Jacket Invitational, 79–67, to host Randolph–Macon on January 9, 1981. The following evening, Le Moyne lost the consolation game to Longwood, 96–75. Joe Nowak scored 24 points to lead the Dolphins, who fell to 2–6 on the season.

The Dolphins' 71–57 loss at Buffalo State on January 17, was called with just under 38 minutes having been played rather than the regulation 40. Joe Nowak got into a shoving match with a Bengals player, and both benches emptied. Le Moyne had 25 turnovers in the game and were never closer than 10 points down in the second half, prompting the officials to call the game early after the scuffle was broken up. Dan Fletcher scored 15 points to lead the Dolphins, who lost their fifth straight game and fell to 2–9.

Head coach Mike Lee was criticized on campus for disparaging remarks he made to the news media about his team and for not accepting responsibility for the Dolphins' poor performance. Lee addressed these comments with the team and said that his quotes were taken out of context, since they were alluding to the state of the team in light of the absence of Chris LaCombe, who was injured at the time, and not to the team as a whole.

The Dolphins lost their 13th straight game, 65–54, at home against Cheyney State on February 9. Jim McDermott scored 16 points to lead Le Moyne, which dropped to 2–17 on the season. The following evening, Mike McDermott scored 13 points to lead the Dolphins to a 69–56 win at Clarkson, ending Le Moyne's longest losing streak in program history.

After starting 0–6, the Dolphins earned their first home victory of the season and first on their own court in one year and five days, when they defeated St. Lawrence, 76–61, on February 17. Jim McDermott scored 18 points to lead the Green and Gold. Le Moyne improved to 4–18 with the win.

The Dolphins salvaged the season finale in what was for the second straight season the worst campaign in program history, defeating Pratt at home, 85–69, on February 28. Jim McDermott, the team's only senior, scored 29 points in his final collegiate game to finish his career with 1,228 points, sixth best in Le Moyne's history. The Dolphins finished the season 5–21. They were 3–5 against Division III opponents and 2–16 versus Division II foes.

== Lassiter and Chestnut arrive (1981–1982) ==
Practices for the 1981–82 season started on October 16, 1981. Captain Jim McDermott was the only player the Dolphins lost to graduation. Seniors Mike McDermott, Chris LaCombe and Dan Fletcher, juniors John Miranda and Joe Nowak and sophomores Paul Galvin, Mike Leithead and Mark Prechtl all returned. Nowak and Galvin shaved their heads during the preseason to the delight of head coach Mike Lee. Sophomore Jimmy Bova, a transfer from Potsdam State, satisfied the required NCAA waiting period and joined the team. New freshman recruits included Wright Lassiter, a 6'5" forward, Bobby Chestnut, a 6'2" guard who was an all-state forward as a senior at Corcoran High School, and Don Murcko, a 6'7" center. John Thompson, a 5'11" freshman guard, made the team as a walk-on. LaCombe and Galvin were named co-captains.

Le Moyne did not have a junior varsity team for the 1981–82 season. Athletic director Tommy Niland was disappointed that a JV team could not be formed, but he noted that during the third week of preseason practices, there were only four players present. Niland said Le Moyne would use the cost saving associated with not having a JV team to start a men's lacrosse team and a women's track team. Le Moyne had sponsored either a JV or a freshman team every season since the 1947–48 campaign.

Freshmen Wright Lassiter and Bobby Chestnut had an immediate impact, sparking a decisive 17–3 run in the second half of the Dolphins' November 20 home opener against East Stroudsburg State that swelled Le Moyne's tenuous two-point lead. The final seven points of the run came in only 17 seconds. Mike McDermott scored a fast-break basket off a Lasseter outlet pass. McDermott was fouled on the play and missed the free throw, but he collected the rebound and hit a jump shot. After the Warriors inbounded the ball, Paul Galvin stole it and passed to Chris LaCombe for a layup. LaCombe was fouled and hit the free throw for a 16-point lead with 12:03 to play. The Dolphins' lead grew as large as 21 points, and they won the game, 72–54, giving Mike Lee his first opening game victory as a head coach. Lassiter and Chestnut scored 10 points each. Sophomore transfer Jimmy Bova was hot at the start of the game, putting Le Moyne in the lead early, and finished with eight points. McDermott scored a game-high 17 points to lead the Dolphins.

Paul Galvin came up with a steal and hit a pair of free throws after getting fouled to extend Le Moyne's lead to four points with 1:30 to play in their opening round game at the Bridgeport Lions Club Classic on December 4. The Dolphins held on and defeated Bridgeport, 65–60, improving to 4–1 on the season. Le Moyne's freshmen continued their stellar play with Wright Lassiter and Bobby Chestnut scoring 13 points each and Don Murcko getting 10 markers. Mike McDermott scored a game-high 22 points for the Dolphins. The following evening, the Dolphins suffered a six-minute scoreless drought in the second half, and Sacred Heart won the tournament title game, 53–39. McDermott led Le Moyne with 16 points, and he and Galvin were named to the all-tournament team.

Mike McDermott scored 30 points to lead the Dolphins to an 83–80 overtime win at home over New Hampshire College on January 16, 1982. McDermott and Paul Galvin sparked a second-half run that helped Le Moyne build a 12-point lead. However, the Penmen got back into the game as the Dolphins tried to milk the clock. The Dolphins found themselves down by three points with 1:12 to play. Bobby Chestnut entered the game and immediately hit a jump shot to cut the deficit to one point. In the closing seconds, New Hampshire College missed a free throw that would have iced the game and then fumbled the rebound. John Miranda picked up the loose ball and found Chestnut streaking up the floor for a game-tying layup. After Le Moyne fell behind by four point early in overtime, McDermott's basket tightened the score. Miranda hit a pair of free throws with 42 seconds to play to put the Dolphins in front, 81–81. After Le Moyne got a stop on the defensive end, McDermott hit two more free throws with 7 seconds left to put the game out of reach. Chestnut finished the game with 10 points, and the Dolphins improved to 6–3 on the season.

A jump shot with four seconds to play by freshman Reggie Fowler gave Cortland State a 77–76 win over the visiting Dolphins on February 3. Le Moyne had a nine-point lead with 4:20 to play but collapsed down the stretch. Mike McDermott scored 18 points to lead the Dolphins, who lost their fourth straight game, all on the road, and saw their record drop to 7–8 on the season.

Mike McDermott scored 24 points to become the 14th player in program history to score 1,000 points for his career in the Dolphins' February 10 home game against Bloomsburg State, ranked no. 11 in the Division II poll at the time. Le Moyne rallied from a nine-point deficit with 5:37 remaining to tie the score at 56, when McDermott's pass found Wright Lassiter, who completed a three-point play with 1:36 left. A Doug Greenholt layup with 49 seconds on the clock gave the Huskies a two-point lead. The Dolphins had four chances to tie the game, but Bobby Chestnut missed three jump shots, and Paul Galvin missed a putback of an offensive rebound. Jon Bardsley controlled the rebound of the fourth miss and dribbled through Le Moyne's trap before getting fouled with one second to go. Bradsley hit one free throw to give Bloomsburg State a 69–68 victory, dropping the Dolphins to 8–10 on the season.

The Dolphins lost their 1981–82 season finale, 71–56, at Adelphi on February 27, and finished the season 10–15, having lost 11 of their final 14 games. Seven of the losses were by four points or fewer with two of those coming in overtime. Don Murcko scored 13 points to lead Le Moyne. In their final collegiate games, Mike McDermott had six points, Chris LaCombe had five and Dan Fletcher scored three points. McDermott finished his career with 1,133 points, 11th on Le Moyne's all-time scoring list.

Head coach Mike Lee's contract expired at the end of the season, and Le Moyne athletic director indicated he and Lee would meet to discuss the future of the program. Le Moyne had been experiencing shrinking support from alumni, who were frustrated by the team's results. Le Moyne's new president, Rev. Frank R. Haig, S.J., had suggested to Niland that Lee's contract should be extended during the season, when the team was 5–3. However, Niland decided to wait until the season concluded. Lee's contract was renewed for one more season.

== Winning record in Lee's final season (1982–1983) ==
Practices for the 1982–83 season commenced on October 15, 1982. The Dolphins lost three players to graduation, including Mike McDermott, the 11th most prolific scorer in program history, co-captain Chris LaCombe and Dan Fletcher. Seniors John Miranda and Joe Nowak, juniors Paul Galvin, Jimmy Bova, Mark Prechtl and Mike Leithead and sophomores Wright Lassiter, Bobby Chestnut and Don Murcko all returned. Newly recruited freshmen were Erick Piscopo, a 5'11" guard from St. Joseph's Collegiate Institute, just outside of Buffalo, Terry Heller, a 6'5" forward from Whitney Point High School, Brent Loggins, a 6'7" forward, and Don Woodford, a 6'6" forward. Sophomore guard John Thompson quit the team to devote more time to his studies. Nowak and Miranda were named co-captains. After a two-year absence, Bob Kawa returned as an assistant coach, replacing head coach Mike Lee's brother Jimmy, who left to become the head coach at Christian Brothers Academy.

In the opening round of the Industrial Basketball Tournament on December 11, 1982, the Dolphins trailed Central Connecticut most of the way, until Jim Bova's 20-foot jump shot gave them a 63–61 lead with four minutes to play. Wright Lassiter and Paul Galvin protected Le Moyne's lead by combining to hit five free throws in the final minute, and the Dolphins held on for a 72–68 victory. Don Murcko led Le Moyne with 21 points and eight rebounds. Galvin had 15 points and seven assists. The following afternoon, Bobby Chestnut scored 20 points, 14 in the second half, to lead the Dolphins to a 67–57 victory over host Hartwick in the tournament final. Lassiter had eight points and 15 rebounds for Le Moyne, and Don Murcko added 16 points, all in the second half. Murcko, Chestnut and Galvin were named to the all-tournament team. The win improved the Dolphins' record to 4–2 on the season.

Dolphins starting center Don Murcko suffered a separated shoulder and shattered ligaments and tendons in his right knee, which required reconstructive surgery, when he was thrown from his girlfriend's car following an accident on January 10, 1983. Murcko was expected to be out of action for as long as eight months. Freshmen Brent Loggins and Don Woodford split time filling in for Murcko in Le Moyne's first game after the accident, a 69–66 home loss to Quinnipiac in which the team appeared distracted on January 15, dropping Le Moyne's record to 5–4.

Mark Prechtl made his second career start, and his early hot shooting, scoring all 12 of his points in the first 10 minutes, helped the Dolphins build a 20–12 lead over Hamilton, which entered the game ranked no. 1 in Division III, on January 26. Le Moyne's defense frustrated the Continentals, who were playing without their injured starting point guard, Kevin Hayden, limiting them to just 32% shooting from the floor, while the Dolphins succeeded at a 49% clip. Don Woodford and Brent Loggins, sharing the load of filling in for the injured Dolphins center, Don Murcko, clogged the lane on the defensive end, holding Hamilton center Mark Burnham to just three points, seven fewer than his average. Woodford and Loggins combined for 12 points and seven rebounds. The Dolphins closed the first half on a 15–3 run and claimed a 39–18 lead at intermission. Bobby Chestnut scored 14 points to lead Le Moyne, and Wright Lassiter added nine points and 10 rebounds in the Dolphins' 75–54 victory. Le Moyne ended their five-game losing streak, two of the losses having been suffered at the hands of Division III teams, and improved to 6–7 on the season.

Even before the season ended, there was speculation as to whether Mike Lee would continue as the Dolphins' head coach. The Dolphins entered their season finale 12–12 with a chance at a winning record. Le Moyne hosted Adelphi, which desperately needed a win to keep their slim hopes for a bid to the NCAA tournament alive, in the Dolphins' season finale. Bobby Chestnut scored 16 points to lead Le Moyne, and Paul Galvin's pair of free throws with five seconds to play iced a 62–60 Dolphins victory. Immediately after the game, Le Moyne announced the Lee would not seek renewal of his contract. Assistant coach Bob Kawa was considered a likely candidate for the job. However, athletic director Tommy Niland indicated two days later, that if Kawa had an inside track to the job, he would have already been hired. Nevertheless, he said Kawa was under consideration. Niland also said that after 10 years away, he missed coaching and had not ruled out returning to the sideline. Lee had left without telling his team or even Kawa that he was resigning. Le Moyne formed a search committee for a new head coach and was accepting applications for the position.

== See also ==
- History of Le Moyne Dolphins men's basketball (1973–1979)
- History of Le Moyne Dolphins men's basketball (1983–1988)
