= History of Le Moyne Dolphins men's basketball (1966–1969) =

NCAA Division I men's basketball team representing Le Moyne College

The history of Le Moyne Dolphins men's basketball from 1966 to 1969 includes two appearances in the NCAA tournament by the Dolphins. After Le Moyne was plagued by academic suspensions and struggled to an 11–10 record in 1966–67, the Dolphins rebounded to earn an at-large bid to the 1968 NCAA tournament under the leadership of senior captain Gerry McDermott. However, with McDermott slowed by a late-season leg injury, the Dolphins fell in the first round. Junior Tom Downey led Le Moyne to a share of the Middle Eastern College Athletic Association (MECAA) championship and a bid to host the regionals of the 1969 NCAA tournament. However, the Dolphins' shooting went cold in the second half of their first-round game, and they were eliminated, despite strong efforts from Chuck Brady and Matt Fallis. Le Moyne's strong play against University Division opponents continued, as the Dolphins won two games against such foes in each of the three seasons.

== A rebuilding year (1966–1967) ==
By 1966, Le Moyne's athletic scholarship budget was $2,500 per annum. Of this total, $2,000 was allotted for four basketball players and did not need to be allocated among those students in equal amounts. The remaining $500 was awarded to a cross-county athlete. Factors taken into account in awarding a scholarship were athletic aptitude, general attitude and financial need. Once a scholarship was awarded, it remained in effect as long as the student continued attending Le Moyne, even if the student decided not to participate in athletics. Coach Niland reported that Le Moyne typically received between 60 and 70 requests for athletic scholarships each year. As of the fall 1965 semester, tuition at Le Moyne was $1,200 per academic year. In late 1966, the Eastern College Athletic Conference (ECAC) amended its rules, allowing scholarships based solely on athletic ability. Previously, ECAC member schools were permitted to grant athletic scholarships only based on financial need and academic achievement.

The Dolphins opened practices for the upcoming season on October 16, 1966. Le Moyne returned only one starter, senior Eric Pitman, with Gary DeYulia, Tom Mullen, Gerry Glose and Jon Cook all having graduated. Junior Dave Cary was the only player other than Pitman who was part of the previous season's rotation. Only six of the 14 players on the team had previously played varsity basketball. Seniors Gerry Ballone and Michael Donegan and juniors Gerry McDermott, Tom Devins, Greg Bonk and Jim Mariotte all returned. Earl Eichelberger joined the team as a junior transfer from Bronx Community College. Sophomores Chuck Brady, Matt Fallis, Mike Kawa, Gary Luke and Jim Colbert were added to the varsity team. The outlook for a fourth straight NCAA tournament appearance was not promising. Pitman was elected captain by his teammates.

In a meeting with the local press less than two weeks before the 1966–67 season opener, Coach Niland expressed concern that the Dolphins would have trouble scoring but praised the ball-handling ability of freshman Tom Downey, younger brother of former Dolphins Jim and Mike Downey, saying that the yearling would start for the varsity team if he were eligible.

Le Moyne reached an agreement to have all Dolphins games, home and away, broadcast on WFBL with Jerry Sanders handling the play-by-play and Ted Downes and Cornelius O'Leary providing color commentary. This was the first season all Dolphins games were broadcast on radio.

In late 1966, Margaret Dwyer, Le Moyne's dean of women, gave permission to female students to begin wearing slacks rather than a skirt or a dress while attending Dolphins basketball games.

A standing room only crowd of more than 2,200 spectators saw the Dolphins open their season with a 72–56 victory over Cortland State on December 3. It was the first time a Le Moyne home opener was a sellout. Dave Cary led the Dolphins with 19 points, and Eric Pitman added 17. Tom Devins and Gerry Ballone each had 14 points and nine rebounds. Le Moyne held the Red Dragons to 34% shooting while hitting 43% of their own shots.

After suffering road losses at King's and Scranton, the Dolphins faced Maine in the third annual Le Moyne Christmas invitational tournament on December 28. Despite a 34-point effort from Terry Carr, the Dolphins broke open a close game over the final 11 minutes, as four Maine players fouled out. Gerry McDermott led Le Moyne with 23 points and pulled down seven rebounds as the Dolphins evened their record at 2–2 with an 85–74 victory. This was Le Moyne's 44th all-time victory over a University Division/major program.

The following night, Bob La Russo scored 24 points, and Bob McMahon added 14 for Iona in a 59–45 win for the Gaels, the first visiting team to win the tournament. Kurt Dorif and Tom Burke gave Iona a dominant rebounding edge, which the Dolphins could not overcome. Gerry McDermott was Le Moyne's only player in double figures with 12 points and was named to the All-Tournament team.

After a home loss to Saint Peter's dropped the Dolphins' record to 2–4, Le Moyne won three straight on the road, the last two of which came via dramatic last-second shots. Eric Pitman's offensive rebound and buzzer-beating 12-foot jump shot gave the Dolphins a 58–56 win at Cortland State on January 11, and Gerry McDermott's driving basket with seven seconds to play was the decider in Le Moyne's 65–63 victory at Siena three nights later. After the team went on a two-week exam break, the Dolphins lost their next game at Iona, 65–48. However, the loss paled in comparison to the news the team received. Starters Dave Cary and Jim Mariotte, both juniors, and reserves junior Greg Bonk and sophomore Gary Luke were all ruled academically ineligible starting in February and through the end of the season.

The Dolphins won their final game before the academic suspensions went into effect, 84–62, at Marist to improve to 6–5. Coach Tom Niland said he expected the academic suspensions would result in starting roles for Matt Fallis and Earl Eichelberger and more playing time for Tom Devins and Chuck Brady. The undermanned Dolphins hosted Assumption, who came into the game 11–1, with their only loss coming at the hands of nationally ranked Providence of the University Division, and on a 10-game winning streak, on February 4. Behind 24 points from Gerry McDermott and 18 points and some outstanding rebounding and defensive work from Gerry Ballone, Le Moyne scored a 79–64 upset victory over the Greyhounds.

The Dolphins won their next two games, both at home, over St. Lawrence and St. Francis (NY). Mike Kawa replaced leading scorer Gerry McDermott, who was being evaluated by doctors for mononucleosis, in the starting lineup for the February 11 St. Francis game and scored 19 points. The win over the Terriers was Le Moyne's 45th all time over a University Division/major program opponent.

Doctors cleared McDermott to play in Le Moyne's next game on February 15, against Hartwick, and he scored 14 points in a 74–69 home loss. Kawa started and had 16 points. The loss to Hartwick was the start of a three-game losing streak, and the Dolphins dropped five of their final seven games of the season to finish 11–10 overall and 1–4 in MECAA play, last in the league. Captain Eric Pitman was presented the first annual Cy Reynolds Memorial Trophy as the season's most outstanding Le Moyne player selected by members of the media.

== Dolphins run to a tournament berth (1967–1968) ==
In the spring of 1967, Le Moyne announced they would begin allowing freshmen to play on the varsity team, after a change in ECAC rules permitted such at schools with fewer than 1,000 male students. Previously, in 1966, the NCAA had relaxed its freshman eligibility restrictions, allowing participation at schools with fewer than 1,250 male students enrolled. Since Le Moyne had less than 900 male students at the time, the Dolphins were covered by the new rule. Coach Tom Niland stated that he expected Le Moyne to continue fielding a freshman team to allow players new to college basketball to gain experience, but freshmen judged ready to compete would be permitted to play on the varsity squad.

Coach Tom Niland said he expected to employ a more up-tempo offense in 1967–68 than he had in the previous season. Senior Gerry McDermott was elected captain by his teammates. Eric Pitman, Gerry Ballone and Michael Donegan were lost to graduation. The Dolphins had seven returning players and five sophomores on the roster. McDermott, Tom Devins and Earl Eichelberger were the three seniors on the team. Junior Gary Luke returned from academic ineligibility and rejoined classmates Chuck Brady, Matt Fallis and Mike Kawa. Sophomores added to the team were the 5'8" Tom Downey, Mike Figler, Dick Hojnacki, Denny Niland and John Zych. Downey and Kawa were expected to compete for a starting guard role. No freshmen were selected to play on the varsity squad. Downey was named the starting point guard before the season opener.

Prior to the opening of training camp, the players went through a new exercise program designed by Niland and Le Moyne's new cross country coach and physical education instructor Dick Rockwell that included weightlifting with the goal of adding two inches to each player's leaping ability.

On November 2, the Dolphins had a home scrimmage against Niagara featuring their star player, future Naismith Memorial Basketball Hall of Famer Calvin Murphy. The Purple Eagles were in town as co-presenters alongside the Dolphins, the Syracuse Orangemen and former Syracuse Nationals player and then Detroit Pistons assistant coach Paul Seymour at Le Moyne's annual basketball clinic for coaches.

WFBL continued to provide radio coverage of every Dolphins game with Jerry Sanders on play-by-play and Ted Downes providing color commentary.

The Dolphins opened their 1967–68 season with an 88–76 victory at St. Lawrence on December 2. Senior captain Gerry McDermott led the way with 28 points. Sophomores John Zych and Tom Downey, who were high school teammates at St. John the Evangelist, had fine showings in their first varsity game. Downey started and scored seven points and displayed impressive ball handling and playmaking skills. Zych came off the bench and used his excellent shooting and driving skills to score 20 points. Junior Matt "Butch" Fallis had 11 points and 11 rebounds. Earl Eichelberger contributed 12 points. Coach Tom Niland said that the starting lineup would vary from game to game this season and be based on the opponent. The lineup of McDermott, Downey, Fallis, Eichelberger and Chuck Brady was chosen to maximize the Dolphins' rebounding ability and slow down the high-octane offense of St Lawrence.

Cold shooting doomed Le Moyne in their December 7 home opener, as they fell to Iona, 58–57, in a game the Gaels controlled from the early minutes, building a lead as large as 14 points. A furious Dolphins rally made the contest close in the final minute. Mike Kawa led the Dolphins with 16 points. However, following the loss, the Dolphins embarked on a five-game winning streak, capped by a 78–74 overtime victory over Bucknell in the final of the Le Moyne Christmas invitational on December 29. Tom Downey and Tom Devins scored baskets for the first four points of overtime to give the Dolphins a 69–65 lead, and the Bison were unable to pull even the rest of the way. Downey hit a pair of free throws in the closing seconds put the game away. Gerry McDermott scored 19 points for Le Moyne and was voted the tournament's most valuable player. Chuck Brady led the Dolphins with 9 rebounds and had 18 points, including a pivotal three-point play on a put-back of an offensive rebound in overtime that gave Le Moyne a 74–68 lead. The previous night, the Dolphins defeated Vermont, 95–72, behind Brady's 20 points and nine rebounds. The two wins in the tournament gave Le Moyne 47 all-time victories over University Division/major programs.

The Dolphins' January 25, 1968 tilt against Boston College was the first time they had a regular-season home game at the Le Moyne Athletic Center sell out in advance. The Eagles featured the three tallest players on the floor in their starting lineup and took control of the game in the opening minutes. Le Moyne struggled to find good looks at the basket ad shot 33% for the game. Despite their sever height disadvantage, the Dolphins were outrebounded by only a 57–47 margin. Gerry McDermott scored 12 points to lead Le Moyne in the 90–61 setback. Tom Downey had 11 points and seven assists for the Dolphins. The loss dropped the Dolphins to 7–5, four of the losses having come against University Division opponents.

Senior Dave Cary, 6'4", overcame academic ineligibility and returned to the Dolphins for their February 8 home game against Cortland State. Prior to his ban, he had been a strong rebounder and an 11-point per game scorer during the first half of the 1966–67 season. Cary made his season debut against Cortland State but played only three minutes and did not score. The Dolphins erased a 17–15 lead, when Mike Kawa scored on a fast break and completed a three-point play with 8:04 to play in the first half. Kawa's basket sparked a 17–2 run that put Le Moyne in control of the game, and they cruised to a 73–57 victory. Matt Fallis scored 24 points to lead the Dolphins.

After an 80–77 loss at Assumption on February 10, dropped the Dolphins' record to 8–6 in collegiate contests, it appeared a foregone conclusion that Le Moyne would not be invited to the NCAA tournament. The Dolphins shared a bus to the Assumption game in Worcester, Massachusetts with Syracuse, who were playing Holy Cross. Chuck Brady had a career-high 32 points for the Dolphins, as the Greyhounds put away a tight game with two free throws with 15 seconds to play. Syracuse lost their game to Holy Cross, 95–79.

After a third straight win improved the Dolphins record to 11–6 in collegiate contests and 9–2 against College Division opponents, talk of an NCAA tournament bid was revived. Gerry McDermott scored 22 points in the 79–70 home win over Ithaca, considered a contender for a tournament bid, on February 20. Chuck Brady added 10 points and 13 rebounds. John Zych and Tom Downey scored 21 and 17 points, respectively. Four days later, another victory, this time over Saint Michael's, who were also widely regarded a contender for a tournament berth, convinced Dolphin's followers that a trip to the NCAA tournament was imminent.

The wins over two highly touted teams led to a revelation from a selection committee member that the Dolphins were "very much in the running for a berth." Tom Downey had 15 points and 10 rebounds in the 83–73 triumph over Saint Michael's. Chuck Brady also had a double-double for Le Moyne with 14 points and 19 rebounds. Mike Kawa had 10 points off the bench having been pressed into duty, after Gerry McDermott turned his left ankle. Tom Devins had eight clutch points, many coming as the Purple Knights were whittling the Dolphins' 22-point lead down to four points.

At 4 p.m. on February 28, the selection committee announced that Le Moyne had been invited to the 1968 NCAA tournament and would open against Buffalo State in Rochester, New York on March 5. The other game in Rochester pitted the host, Rochester, against Northeastern. The two winners would meet in the regional semifinals on March 6.

Le Moyne had a game scheduled at Alfred on March 5. This game was moved to March 9, provided the Dolphins did not advance to the regional final. If Le Moyne won two games in Rochester, the Alfred game would be cancelled.

In a final tune-up before the NCAA tournament, the Dolphins posted an 82–70 home win over Siena on March 2. Mike Kawa filled in admirably for Dolphins' captain and leading scorer, Gerry McDermott, who was out with a pulled tendon in his left leg. Matt Fallis led Le Moyne with 22 points and 13 rebounds. The win improved the Dolphins' record to 13–6 in college contests with four of their losses coming at the hands of University Division opponents. Le Moyne closed their MECAA slate with a 2–3 record, winning both games against College Division teams and losing all three versus University Division foes. At halftime, McDermott was presented the Cy Reynolds Memorial Trophy as the most valuable player of the team selected by members of the media. McDermott's status for the NCAA tournament was doubtful.

About 500 Dolphins fans made the journey to Rochester, but Le Moyne's senior captain and leading scorer, Gerry McDermott, could only play limited minutes due to injury. Buffalo State used their size advantage to control the boards on their way to an 83–66 victory. Charles Davis led the Orangemen with 20 points and 27 rebounds. Le Moyne struggled throughout the game to get good looks at the basket against taller defenders. Tom Downey managed to score 13 points. John Zych was the only other Dolphin to reach double figures with 10 points. McDermott finished with eight points.

Northeastern hit 23 of 34 free-throw attempts compared with only 6 for 11 by the Dolphins, and the Huskies won the consolation game of the Northeast Region's Section B, 67–54. Each team had 44 rebounds, and Le Moyne had 24 field goals, while Northeastern had only 22. However, the Dolphins were unable to defend the larger Huskies without fouling. Senior Dave Cary came off the bench to score a season-high 21 points for Le Moyne. Earl Eichelberger had 10 rebounds. Tom Downey was held to four points. Gerry McDermott exacerbated his left heel injury in the Buffalo State game and did not play.

The Dolphins closed their season with an 83–80 win at Alfred on March 9, to finish 14–8 in collegiate contests. Tom Downey scored 22 points to lead the Dolphins, who needed to hit six straight free throws in the final minute to avoid letting a 14-point halftime lead slip away. Mike Doviak had 36 points and 18 rebounds for the Saxons. Captain Gerry McDermott returned to action for the Dolphins and scored 10 points in his final collegiate game. Seniors Earl Eichelberger and Tom Devins had 13 and nine points respectively to close their collegiate careers, while Davy Cary went scoreless.

Gerry McDermott was named to the second team of the 1968 NCAA District 2 College Division All-Stars.

== Hosting the tournament for a third time (1968–1969) ==
Tom Cooney, who played for the Dolphins from 1961 to 1964, was hired as assistant to the head coach in August 1968.

The Dolphins lost captain Gerry McDermott, Tom Devins, Earl Eichelberger and Dave Cary to graduation in 1968. Seniors Chuck Brady, Matt Fallis and Mike Kawa were elected tri-captains. Juniors Tom Downey and John Zych, key players on the 1968 NCAA tournament team, returned for the 1968–69 season along with reserve Dick Hojnacki. The team featured five sophomores, including stars from the previous season's freshman team John Kutzuba, Don Guido, Cleveland McCurty, Bob Boedicker and Dan McDermott, brother of 1967–68 team captain Gerry McDermott. Junior transfers Bob Bradley and Chuck Eggleston became eligible after sitting out the previous season.

Le Moyne opened the 1968–69 season with a December 3 home game against Saint Peter's who were coming off a run to the NIT semifinals. Leading scorer Elnardo Webster, who had 51 points in the Run Baby Run Peacocks' first-round double overtime NIT win at Madison Square Garden, was returning for his second season. Behind the hot shooting of John Zych and Mike Kawa, the ball-denial defense of Matt "Butch" Fallis, the rebounding of Chuck Brady and the ball handling and floor leadership of Tom Downey, the Dolphins jumped all over the Peacocks early and built a 45–37 halftime lead. The Saint Peter's defense was able to slow down Le Moyne in the opening minutes of the second half, but the Dolphins found their bearings, and Downey consistently broke the Peacocks' press. Le Moyne had an 18-point lead with 5:21 to play. Webster, who had been contained up to that point, suddenly got hot, and the Dolphins appeared weary. Kawa and Brady both fouled out with about three minutes remaining, and a furious run by the Peacocks cut the lead to 77–74 with 1:24 on the clock. A basket by Fallis was answered by Webster, and Saint Peter's fouled Zych, who hit both ends of a one-and-one. After another Saint Peter's basket cut the lead to three points, Downey attempted to dribble out the clock. The Peacocks got a steal with eight seconds to play and Webster's ensuing layup on which Le Moyne wisely avoided fouling came just four seconds later. Saint Peter's came up just short, and the Dolphins held on for an 81–80 victory. Zych finished with a game-high 27 points, while Webster was held to 21. Brady had 10 rebounds, and Le Moyne held a 29–22 edge on the boards over the taller Peacocks. The win was Le Moyne's 48th all-time versus University Division/major programs.

The Dolphins topped the century mark for the first time at the Le Moyne Athletic Center in the semifinal of their fifth annual Christmas invitational tournament against Steubenville on December 27. Le Moyne's previous home game with 100 or more points scored was a 122–65 victory over St. Lawrence at the Onondaga County War Memorial on December 8, 1956. John Zych had a game-high 21 points to lead the Dolphins, who had six players in double figures, to a 101–81 win. The following evening, tournament most valuable player Ray Hodge had 25 points to lead Wagner to a 91–81 victory over Le Moyne in the championship game of the invitational. The loss dropped the Dolphins' record to 5–3 on the season. Chuck Brady was named to the all-tournament team.

Chuck Brady scored 24 points and grabbed 17 rebounds to lead Le Moyne to an 80–75 home victory over St. Francis (NY) on January 4, 1969. The Dolphins used an early 12–2 run to take a seven-point lead and never trailed again. Le Moyne's lead swelled to 14 points, but the Terriers switched from a zone to a man-to-man press and closed the first half on a 15–5 run to cut their deficit to four points at the break. Brady stunted St. Francis's momentum, when he found Dick Hojnacki for an easy layup to extend the Dolphins' lead to seven with four minutes to play. After John Conforti, who had a game-high 25 points for the Terriers, stole the ball, he missed an uncontested layup that would have cut Le Moyne's lead to three points with 49 seconds to play. Brady then found Hojnacki again for another layup that sealed the outcome. Hojnacki finished with six points. Dolphins point guard Tom Downey scored 18 points, and Bob Kawa had 12 despite foul trouble. John Zych contributed seven points and 13 rebounds. The scrappy Dolphins outrebounded the taller Terriers, 53–40. The victory gave the Dolphins a 4–0 record in MECAA games and was their second win of the season and 49th all time over a University Division/major program opponent.

After Saint Peter's secured a 70–68 home win over Iona on January 11, every MECAA team other than Le Moyne had at least one conference loss, and Le Moyne had only one league game remaining, at Iona on January 30. As a result, the Dolphins clinched at least a share of the MECAA championship, their sixth league title.

The Dolphins followed their win over St. Francis with three straight road wins to improve to 9–3. The streak was capped by a 67–59 win at Ithaca on January 21. After scoring the game's first six points, Le Moyne stretched their first-half lead to 11 points, only to see the Bombers mount a comeback and cut the lead to 31–29 at halftime. A pair of baskets by Rich Miller and Keith Shields midway through the second half gave Ithaca their first lead of the game at 44–43. With six minutes to play and the Dolphins nursing a 51–50 lead, Le Moyne embarked on a 10–0 run fueled by baskets from Chuck Brady, John Zych and Dick Hojnacki to put the game out of reach. After Ithaca star Greg Albano scored 14 points in the first half, Brady began guarding him in the second half and held him to only three more points. Mike Kawa had a game-high 18 points on 8-for-9 shooting from the floor for the Dolphins.

The Dolphins had an opportunity to complete a perfect 5–0 conference season and clinch the MECAA title outright, when they traveled to face Iona on January 30. However, Le Moyne would have to move forward without sharpshooter John Zych, who was averaging 13 points per game but was ruled academically ineligible for the remainder of the season. Also lost for academic reasons were sophomore John Kutzuba, junior Chuck Eggleston, Mike Collier and sophomore Cleveland McCurty, who left the school. The sudden severe manpower shortage forced the Dolphins to call up John Zagata from the freshman team.

Led by Al Kindlemann, the tallest player on the floor, Iona used their height advantage to gain a 49–37 rebounding advantage for the game and build a 20-point halftime lead. Le Moyne's starting point guard, Tom Downey, fouled out late in the first half. The Dolphins were more effective defensively after the intermission and started the second half on a 25–9 extended run to pull within four points at 54–50. However, the Gaels were effective from the free-throw line during the final three minutes and held on for a 68–59 win. Chuck Brady led the Dolphins with a game-high 21 points. John Zagata made his varsity debut but did not score. Le Moyne fell to 4–1 in MECAA play and 9–4 overall. St. Francis (NY) and Saint Peter's were the only two remaining MECAA teams with just one conference loss, and the two were scheduled to play on February 12, in Jersey City. Either team could tie Le Moyne for the conference championship by winning their remaining league games.

Bob Bradley got his first start for the Dolphins and responded with a game-high 33 points in Le Moyne's 99–64 home victory over St. Lawrence on February 1.

Saint Peter's defeated St. Francis (NY), 90–59, on February 12, leaving the Peacocks and the Dolphins as the only MECAA teams with just one loss in league play.

After Le Moyne's fourth straight win and eighth in its previous nine games, a 68–62 home decision on February 15, over Buffalo, improved the Dolphins' record to 13–4, they were considered serious contenders for a berth in the NCAA tournament and offered the Le Moyne Athletic Center as a site for the regionals. A second-half run that got started when Buffalo switched to a 1–3–1 zone defense erased Le Moyne's eight-point lead and tied the game at 57 with 2:20 remaining. Baskets by Mike Kawa and Bob Bradley put the Dolphins ahead, 61–57, but a three-point play by John Vaughn cut the lead to one point. Le Moyne's effective ball movement in the closing minutes allowed them to solve the Bulls' zone and end the game on a 7–2 run. Bradley's pass to Matt Fallis set up the basket that put the game out of reach. Kawa had 16 points for the Dolphins. Fallis, playing center at 6'4", grabbed 11 rebounds and held the 6'9" Vaughn to just 13 points on the defensive end.

Playing without their star senior co-captain, Pete Arnold, Hartwick shot 52% from the floor to avenge a January home loss and defeat Le Moyne, 80–70, on February 19. A beat reporter commented that the Dolphins appeared unusually tense and speculated it might be related to the uncertainty surrounding their NCAA tournament berth. The game was tied at 34 at halftime, and the Warriors used hot shooting to open the second half with an 18–4 run, while Le Moyne's shooting went cold. Tom Downey had four fouls in the first half and sat out much of the second half before fouling out with five minutes remaining. Mike Kawa and Bob Bradley each had 16 points to lead the Dolphins.

Despite the loss to Hartwick, the following day, the Dolphins were invited to the NCAA tournament for the second straight season and fifth time in six years and selected to host the East Regional tournament games. Wagner, who won Le Moyne's 1968 Christmas invitational, was named as the second of four teams in the East Region. Tickets for the regionals went on sale on February 28, priced at $2.50 per doubleheader or $4 for both nights.

Following a second straight loss, the Dolphins won their home finale, 95–75, over Cortland State on February 25. Mike Kawa led the way with 20 points for Le Moyne. Chuck Brady scored 17 points and grabbed 20 rebounds, as the Dolphins outrebounded the Red Dragons, 55–37. With 11 minutes to play, Mat Fallis, who finished with 15 points, scored off an offensive rebound and fell to the floor. He had to be helped off the court. After his ankle was packed in ice, Fallis was taken to the hospital for observation. In a halftime ceremony, Tom Downey was presented the Cy Reynolds Memorial Trophy as the team's most valuable player.

To celebrate the Dolphins' invitation to the NCAA tournament, a group of Le Moyne students started a 100-hour basketball game at 8 a.m. on March 2, to conclude at noon on March 6.

The Dolphins closed their regular season with an 85–74 win at Siena on March 1. Matt Fallis sat out with the ankle injury he suffered against Cortland State. He was replaced in the starting lineup by Dick Hojnacki, who responded with 19 points and a strong inside game.

Saint Peter's earned a 113–67 road win at Siena on March 4, to finish 4–1 in MECAA play and tie Le Moyne for the conference championship.

Two days before Le Moyne's March 7 NCAA tournament opener against Montclair State, Matt Fallis's ankle had shown improvement, but his status remained uncertain. Fallis was able to play and finished with 12 points. Chuck Brady had 14 points in the first half, and the Dolphins had a 43–40 lead at intermission after a back and forth opening stanza which saw each team lead by as many as seven points. The Indians opened the second half with a three-point play by Luther Bowen, who finished with 24 points, to tie the game at 43. With the game tied at 58, Montclair State went on a 12–2 run to take a 10-point lead as the Dolphins' shooting went cold. Le Moyne got no closer than six points down, until Brady's midcourt shot went through the hoop at the final buzzer, as the Indians held on for an 81–77 win. Brady matched Bowen with a game-high 24 points.

The Dolphins jumped all over Albany State (NY) in the regional third-place game, building a 44–30 halftime lead and stretching it to a 20-point advantage early in the second half. However, the Great Danes fought back, led by Rich Margison, who scored 24 second-half points on 10-for-13 shooting. Le Moyne had a 70–66 lead in the final minute, but two baskets by Margison, the second with 20 seconds to play, tied the game at 70. A Margison free throw with three seconds left gave Albany State the win, 71–70. Margison finished with a game-high 28 points. Bob Bradley scored 24 points for the Dolphins and was named to the East Region all-tournament team. The Dolphins finished the season 15–8. They were 13–6 against College Division opponents and 2–2 versus University Division foes.

Tom Downey was named to the 1969 All-East Region first team by the National Association of Basketball Coaches.

== See also ==
- History of Le Moyne Dolphins men's basketball (1963–1966)
- History of Le Moyne Dolphins men's basketball (1969–1973)
