= 1964 NCAA College Division basketball tournament =

Edition of USA college basketball tournament

- Teams: 32
- Finals site: Roberts Municipal Stadium, Evansville, Indiana
- Champions: Evansville Purple Aces (3rd title)
- Runner-up: Akron Zips (1st title game)
- Semifinalists: North Carolina A&T Aggies (2nd Final Four); Northern Iowa Panthers (1st Final Four)
- Winning coach: Arad McCutchan (3rd title)
- MOP: Jerry Sloan (Evansville)
- Attendance: 31,915

The 1964 NCAA College Division basketball tournament involved 32 schools playing in a single-elimination tournament to determine the national champion of men's NCAA College Division college basketball as a culmination of the 1963–64 NCAA College Division men's basketball season. It was won by the University of Evansville, with Evansville's Jerry Sloan named the Most Outstanding Player.

1964 NCAA Division II Men's sites - regionals (cyan) Elite Eight (red)

== Regional participants ==
School	Outcome
Catholic	Fourth Place
Elizabethtown	Runner-up
Hofstra	Regional Champion
Philadelphia Textile	Third Place

School	Outcome
Akron	Regional Champion
Ithaca	Fourth Place
Le Moyne	Runner-up
Youngstown State	Third Place

School	Outcome
Adelphi	Regional Champion
Assumption	Third Place
Northeastern	Runner-up
Springfield	Fourth Place

School	Outcome
Centre	Fourth Place
Fisk	Runner-up
Kentucky Wesleyan	Third Place
North Carolina A&T	Regional Champion

School	Outcome
Abilene Christian	Runner-up
Colorado State College	Fourth Place
Lamar	Third Place
SE Missouri State	Regional Champion

School	Outcome
Mankato State	Runner-up
Nebraska Wesleyan	Third Place
Northern Iowa	Regional Champion
Washington (MO)	Fourth Place

School	Outcome
Cal Poly Pomona	Regional Champion
Fresno State	Runner-up
Nevada	Fourth Place
Seattle Pacific	Third Place

School	Outcome
Ball State	Fourth Place
Evansville	Regional Champion
Jackson State	Third Place
Southern Illinois	Runner-up

== Regionals ==
=== East - Hempstead, New York ===
Location: Memorial Hall Host: Hofstra University

Regional semifinals Round of 32; March 6
Elizabethtown	74
Philadelphia Textile	73
Hofstra	92**
Catholic	91

Regional Final; Sweet 16; March 7
Elizabethtown	61
Hofstra	74

- Third Place - Philadelphia Textile 94, Catholic 64

=== Mideast - Akron, Ohio ===
Location: Memorial Hall Host: Municipal University of Akron

Regional semifinals Round of 32; March 6
Le Moyne	64
Youngstown State	53
Akron	94
Ithaca	77

Regional Final; Sweet 16; March 7
Le Moyne	38
Akron	62

- Third Place - Youngstown State 91, Ithaca 79

=== Northeast - Worcester, Massachusetts ===
Location: Andrew Laska Gymnasium Host: Assumption College

Regional semifinals Round of 32; March 6
Northeastern	79
Assumption	68
Adelphi	75
Springfield	71

Regional Final; Sweet 16; March 7
Northeastern	66
Adelphi	68

- Third Place - Assumption 64, Springfield 60

=== South Central - Owensboro, Kentucky ===
Location: Owensboro Sportscenter Host: Kentucky Wesleyan College

Regional semifinals Round of 32; March 5
Fisk	91
Kentucky Wesleyan	86
North Carolina A&T	86
Centre	68

Regional Final; Sweet 16; March 6
Fisk	87
North Carolina A&T	112

- Third Place - Kentucky Wesleyan 91, Centre 71

=== Southwest - Beaumont, Texas ===
Location: Beaumont Civic Center Host: Lamar State College of Technology

Regional semifinals Round of 32; March 6
SE Missouri State	83
Colorado State College	79
Abilene Christian	73
Lamar	71

Regional Final; Sweet 16; March 7
SE Missouri State	90
Abilene Christian	87

- Third Place - Lamar 116, Colorado State College 85

=== Midwest - Cedar Falls, Iowa ===
Location: West Gym Host: State College of Iowa

Regional semifinals Round of 32; March 6
Mankato State	87
Nebraska Wesleyan	72
Northern Iowa	71
Washington (MO)	56

Regional Final; Sweet 16; March 7
Mankato State	64
Northern Iowa	71*

- Third Place - Washington (MO) 77, Nebraska Wesleyan 74

=== Pacific Coast - Fresno, California ===
Location: North Gym Host: Fresno State College

Regional semifinals Round of 32; March 6
Cal Poly Pomona	99
Nevada	71
Fresno State	68
Seattle Pacific	53

Regional Final; Sweet 16; March 7
Cal Poly Pomona	79
Fresno State	72

- Third Place - Seattle Pacific 76, Nevada 74

=== Great Lakes - Evansville, Indiana ===
Location: Roberts Municipal Stadium Host: Evansville College

Regional semifinals Round of 32; March 5
Evansville	97
Jackson State	69
Southern Illinois	88
Ball State	81

Regional Final; Sweet 16; March 6
Evansville	64
Southern Illinois	59

- Third Place - Jackson State 92, Ball State 71

*denotes each overtime played

== National Finals - Evansville, Indiana ==
Location: Roberts Municipal Stadium Host: Evansville College

National Quarterfinals; Elite Eight; March 11
Hofstra	58
Akron	77
Adelphi	80
North Carolina A&T	83
SE Missouri State	85
Northern Iowa	93
Cal Poly Pomona	73
Evansville	95

National semifinals Final Four; March 12
Akron	57
North Carolina A&T	48
Northern Iowa	67
Evansville	82

National Championship; March 13
Akron	59
Evansville	72

- Third Place - North Carolina A&T 91, Northern Iowa 72

*denotes each overtime played

== All-tournament team ==
- Buster Briley (Evansville)
- Larry Humes (Evansville)
- Maurice McHartley (North Carolina A&T)
- Jerry Sloan (Evansville)
- Bill Stevens (Akron)

== See also ==
- 1964 NCAA University Division basketball tournament
- 1964 NAIA Basketball Tournament

== Sources ==
- 2010 NCAA Men's Basketball Championship Tournament Records and Statistics: Division II men's basketball Championship
- 1964 NCAA College Division Men's Basketball Tournament jonfmorse.com
