= National Catholic Invitational Tournament =

Men's college basketball tournament played in the mid 20th century

The National Catholic Invitational Tournament (NCIT) was a men's college basketball tournament played in the late 1940s and early 1950s. At the time the NCIT was one of the three major college basketball postseason tournaments that included the NCAA, NIT, and NCIT. In 1949 the NCAA and NIT tournaments featured only eight invites each and the scarcity of post season opportunities allowed the NCIT to provide an option for quality basketball programs without conference affiliations to participate in post season play. Only Catholic schools were invited to participate. In the inaugural year sixteen Catholic schools were invited to participate, but the tournament reduced the field to eight teams in 1950.

== Champions ==
Year	Champion	Runner-up	Final score	Location
1949	Regis	St. Francis (NY)	51-47	Denver, CO
1950	Siena	St. Francis (NY)	57-50	Albany, NY
1951	St. Francis (NY)	Seattle	93-79	Albany, NY
1952	Marquette	St. Francis (PA)	76-64	Troy, NY

== 1949 National Catholic Invitation Tournament ==
Regis College captured the inaugural NCIT championship in Denver by defeating St. Francis 51-47. The Rangers were one of four seeded teams that included Gonzaga, St. Thomas (MN), and Siena. Regis would advance to the finals to play St. Francis of Brooklyn. The Terriers were invited to participate in the tournament featured star Tommy Gallagher. Gallagher was awarded a trophy as the Tournaments outstanding player. Regis placed three players on the all tournament team.

First Round; March 23
St. Francis (NY)	61
St. Norbert's	53
3	St. Thomas	69
St. Edward's	32
St. Benedict's	60
1	Siena	46
Dayton	53
Loras	52
2	Regis	63
Iona	51
Saint Francis (PA)	57
Mount St. Mary's	51
Loyola (MD)	75
St. Ambrose	58
4	Gonzaga	49
St. Bonaventure	40

Quarterfinals; March 24
St. Francis (NY)	59
3	St. Thomas	42
St. Benedict's	59
Dayton	55
2	Regis	66
Saint Francis (PA)	49
Loyola (MD)	53
4	Gonzaga	51

Semifinals; March 25
St. Francis (NY)	69
St. Benedict's	40
2	Regis	67
Loyola (MD)	60

Finals; March 26
St. Francis (NY)	47
2	Regis	51
Third place
Loyola (MD)	71
St. Benedict's	70

== 1950 National Catholic Invitation Tournament ==
Originally the tournament was to take place at Loyola College in Baltimore, MD from March 15 to March 22 and feature sixteen teams. Yet, because of segregation and protest from St. Francis College about the unequal treatment of its black players, the tournament was moved to Albany, NY and featured eight teams. Creighton was favored to win the tournament, although they had a 13-13 record going into the tournament the Bluejays had the toughest schedule of the eight competing teams.

Quarter-finals
St. Francis (NY)	67
Creighton	66
Iona	71
Saint Michael's	55
Loras	59
Saint Francis (PA)	58
Siena	86
Providence	49

Semi-finals
St. Francis (NY)	62
Iona	61
Siena	75
Loras	55

Final
St. Francis (NY)	50
Siena	57
Third place
Loras	55
Iona	52

== 1951 National Catholic Invitation Tournament ==
The tournament took place at the Albany Armory in Albany, NY from March 13 to March 17. St. Francis of Brooklyn appeared in the title game for the third straight year, but this time came away with the championship banner. Ray Rudzinski led the Terriers with 26 points while Vernon Stokes scored 22 and Roy Reardon scored 21.

In January 1951, the National Catholic Intercollegiate Athletic Association, sponsor and organizer of the tournament, announced the 1951 NCIT would feature a 12-team field from all parts of the nation. Automatic bids were to be awarded to the champions two conferences: The Eastern Catholic Intercollegiate Athletic Conference (ECIAC), which included Siena, Seton Hall, Iona, Le Moyne, St. Francis (NY), Saint Francis (PA), Loyola Maryland, Saint Peter's and King's and the Midlands Conference (St. Ambrose University, Saint Joseph's (IN), Loras and St. Norbert). In addition, one bid was reserved for either Portland, Gonzaga or Seattle to represent the Pacific Northwest. Seton Hall won the ECIAC championship but declined the automatic bid to the NCIT, since they were invited to the NIT. Five ECIAC teams participated in the tournament. Loras won the Midlands Conference championship and accepted the automatic bid.

Four teams were seeded and received a bye to the quarterfinals.

First round
St. Francis (NY)	74
Spring Hill	65
Le Moyne	95
Saint Michael's	57
Iona	54
St. Mary's (MN)	52
Mount St. Mary's	91
St. Norbert	59

Quarter-finals
4	Loras	63
St. Francis (NY)	65
2	Siena	53
Le Moyne	57
3	Seattle	69
Iona	67
1	Saint Francis (PA)	74
Mount St. Mary's	83

Semi-finals
St. Francis (NY)	84
Le Moyne	66
3	Seattle	102
Mount St. Mary's	85

Final
St. Francis (NY)	93
3	Seattle	79
Third place
Le Moyne	63
Mount St. Mary's	61

== 1952 National Catholic Invitation Tournament ==
The tournament took place at Rensselaer Polytechnic Institute Field House in Troy, New York, from March 15 to March 22. Marquette University, under rookie head coach Tex Winter, defeated St. Francis (PA) to capture their first national tournament championship. The Warriors were seeded second and defeated Iona, St. Francis of Brooklyn before capturing the title. Coach Winter was the youngest basketball coach in college at the time. The winning Warriors were honored in 2002 for the 50th anniversary of the accomplishment.

First round
Scranton	85
Saint Mary's (MN)	78
Saint Francis (PA)	66
Loyola (MD)	52
Iona	68
Gannon (PA)	52
Le Moyne	67
Providence	63

Quarter-finals
(1 seed) Siena	79
Scranton	57
(3 seed) Saint Joseph's	56
Saint Francis (PA)	65
(2 seed) Marquette	66
Iona	59
(4 seed) St. Francis (NY)	75
Le Moyne	61

Semi-finals
Saint Francis (PA)	54
Siena	51
Marquette	79
St. Francis (NY)	57

Final
Marquette	76
Saint Francis (PA)	64
Third place
Siena	64
St. Francis (NY)	50
