= History of Le Moyne Dolphins men's basketball (1988–1992) =

NCAA Division I men's basketball team representing Le Moyne College

The history of Le Moyne Dolphins men's basketball from 1988 to 1992 includes the final four years of the head coaching tenure of John Beilein. The Dolphins had winning records in each of these four seasons, compiling a 66–45 record, but displayed inconsistency and failed to reach the postseason. Despite frequent feuding between Len Rauch and Beilein, Rauch became the program's all-time leading scorer and rebounder and was 1991 third-team Division II All-America, the first player in program history to be named an All-American by the National Association of Basketball Coaches. Freshman and future Le Moyne Athletic Hall of Famer Mike Montesano arrived on campus in Beilein's final season and was Eastern College Athletic Conference (ECAC) co-rookie of the year. Beilein resigned after the season to become the head coach at Division I Canisius. He finished his nine-year career at Le Moyne 163–94. Beilein's .634 winning percentage was the best for any Dolphins head coach up to that point.

== Slow start, strong finish and emergence of Rauch (1988–1989) ==
The Dolphins lost senior co-captains Scott Hicks and Pete Jerebko to graduation in 1988. Seniors Dave Niland and Steve Lauer, juniors Russell Barnes, Jim Cunningham and Paul Rooney and sophomores Len Rauch, Julius Edwards, Andy Bechtle and Matt Lucas all returned. Freshman Bob Piddock, a 6'4" forward from South Jefferson High School in Adams, New York, was Le Moyne's top recruit. Two walk-on freshman guards made the team: Jeffrey Heller, 6'2", and John Peyrebrune, 5'10". Tom Herhusky, a 6'2" point guard, transferred from St. Lawrence to Le Moyne during the offseason, but he was required to sit out the 1988–89 season by NCAA rules. Herhusky graduated a year earlier than Piddock, but the two were high school teammates, and Herhusky said he wanted to be reunited with Piddock. He also cited Le Moyne's academic offerings and the availability of an athletic scholarship as reasons for the transfer. Niland and Lauer were named co-captains. Jim Emery was hired as an assistant coach in October 1988. Emery had been an assistant at George Mason since 1985, and had previously been Dolphins head coach John Beilein's assistant at Nazareth in 1982.

The Dolphins opened their 1988–89 season with a 73–70 overtime loss to Belmont Abbey in the Randolph–Macon Tournament, which was actually a multi-team showcase event despite its name, on November 18. After getting into foul trouble early, Len Rauch led Le Moyne with 16 points. The following evening, the Dolphins lost to host Randolph–Macon, 60–53. Rauch scored 13 points to lead Le Moyne.

On December 3, Siena visited Le Moyne for the first time since March 4, 1976. Despite a 26-point and 13-rebound performance by Len Rauch, Siena overwhelmed the Dolphins, 91–52, dropping Le Moyne's record to 1–3 on the season.

The Dolphins hosted the 1988 New York Coca-Cola Classic and seized control of their opening-round game against defending ECAC Division II tournament champion Dowling early, cruising to an 84–70 victory on December 9. Len Rauch had a double-double to lead Le Moyne with 24 points, 14 rebounds and seven assists. Russell Barnes had 15 points and nine assists, and Julius Edwards added 17 points. In the championship game the following evening, the Dolphins failed to score until five minutes had elapsed and fell behind early. A late first-half rally sparked by Dave Niland cut Cheyney's halftime lead to six points. However, the Wolves scored the first 10 points of the second half and led 45–28 with 15 minutes to play. The Dolphins' comeback began with a Rauch layup following an offensive rebound. Le Moyne then began forcing turnovers, blocking shots, controlling the boards and hitting shots of their own. When Paul Rooney hot a pair of free throws with 1:12 remaining, the Dolphins had a 63–61 lead and were on a 35–16 run over 14 minutes. Cheyney responded with a three-point play to regain the lead. Rauch was fouled on Le Moyne's final possession with 12 seconds to play, and he hit both free throws. The Wolves' final desperation heave fell short, and the Dolphins had a 65–64 victory and the tournament title. The win improved Le Moyne's record to 4–3 on the season.

Russell Barnes scored 18 points, and freshman Bob Piddock added 12 to lead the Dolphins to an 81–70 victory over American International in the opening round of the Doc Jacobs Classic on December 29. The following evening, Le Moyne fell 14 points behind host Saint Michael's in the first half before closing the gap to just six points at intermission. In the second half, the Purple Knights built nine-point leads on six separate occasions, only to see the Dolphins respond and tie the score each time. Trailing by nine points, 74–65, a seventh time with three minutes to play, Le Moyne mounted a final charge. Paul Rooney hit a three-pointer, and Len Rauch completed a three point play to cut the lead to three points. After a stop on the defensive end, the Dolphins moved within a point, when Rooney scored from the paint with 1:02 to play. After the Dolphins got another stop, Rauch was called for an offensive foul. Le Moyne then forced a turnover, when the Saint Michael's lost the ball out of bounds. Russell Barnes was poised to take the final shot, but he was stripped from behind by Greg Thomas, who dribbled out the clock and preserved a 74–73 win for the Purple Knights. Rauch had 17 points and nine rebounds and was named to the all-tournament team.

The Dolphins lost their fifth straight game, when they fell at home to Philadelphia Textile, 73–60, on January 14, 1989, dropping to 5–8 overall and 0–4 in Mideast Collegiate Conference (MECC) play. Len Rauch scored 15 points and grabbed 11 rebounds but continued his recent erratic play. Le Moyne guards Russell Barnes, Julius Edwards and Dave Niland combined for only 13 points. The Dolphins led, 48–46, with 9:18 to play but were outscored, 27–12, down the stretch. Two days later, Rauch scored 30 points, and the Dolphins erased an eight-point second-half deficit with a 17–4 run, winning, 80–79, at Mansfield.

Len Rauch had a triple-double with 14 points, 14 rebounds and 13 assists in the Dolphins' 96–80 home romp over Adelphi on January 27. Le Moyne used runs of 15–0 and 14–0 to build a 24-point lead late in the first half. Sophomore Andy Bechtle made his first collegiate start as the Dolphins' power forward and scored 10 points in the first 7 1/2 minutes of the game, finishing with 12 markers. Freshman Bob Piddock led Le Moyne with 18 points, seven of them coming during the Dolphins' 14–0 first-half burst. Le Moyne's 2-3 zone defense limited the Panthers to 35% shooting from the floor in the first half. Adelphi applied a pressing defense late in the second half, forcing Le Moyne turnovers and pulling within nine points at 83–74 with 1:54 to play, but the Panthers got no closer. The win improved the Dolphins' record to 9–9 overall and 2–4 in MECC play.

The Dolphins' man-to-man defense generated transition opportunities, and Le Moyne claimed a 26–12 lead midway through the first half of their January 31 home game against Gannon, ranked no. 12 in Division II. The Golden Knights used their size advantage to cut Le Moyne's lead to four points in the second half, but the Dolphins responded with an 18–9 run that put them ahead, 66–53, with 8:35 to play. Le Moyne stopped driving to the basket and tried to milk the clock, but the Dolphins went cold from the perimeter. They had only one field goal over the final 5:45 of the game. That basket was scored by Russell Barnes with 15 seconds remaining and gave the Dolphins an 85–79 lead, icing the game. Barnes and Len Rauch each had a double-double for Le Moyne. Barnes finished with 10 points and 10 assists. Rauch scored 17 points and grabbed 13 rebounds. Julius Edwards guarded Gannon's leading scorer, Chris Hollan, holding him to just 5-for-12 shooting from the floor, and scored 25 points to lead the Dolphins, who improved to 10–9 overall and 3–4 in MECC play.

The Dolphins dropped a critical decision at home against Pace, 79–78 in double overtime, on February 4. The Setters started the game slowly, having arrived only 20 minutes before tip-off, after spending five hours in a Burger King while mechanical trouble with their bus from Buffalo was addressed. The Dolphins quickly built a seven-point lead in less than nine minutes, and they extended that lead to 12 points with 15 minutes remaining. Pace's offense heated up from there, and the Setters took their first lead of the game with six minutes to play. The Dolphins led, 61–59, in the final minute, but the Setters tied the score on a pair of free throws. Julius Edwards fired a long jump shot at the buzzer that was off the mark. The Dolphins led by as many as five points in the first overtime period, but Pace battled back and tied the score in the closing minute. Russell Barnes attempted a three-pointer that was off the mark at the buzzer, sending the game to a second overtime. Le Moyne was protecting a one-point lead, when Rodney Reese hit an off-balance jump shot with two seconds on the clock to win the game for Pace. A win would have put the Dolphins into a three-way tie with Adelphi and Pace for third place in the MECC. The third- and fourth-place finishers were to play their MECC tournament quarterfinal games at home. Instead, Le Moyne was fifth in the league standings at 3–5, and Pace had earned the tiebreaker advantage over the Dolphins by sweeping the season series.

After 18 straight losses versus Division I opponents, a streak that began in 1977, Le Moyne got 22 points from Andy Bechtle and overcame a five-point deficit with just over 10 minutes to play to defeat Army, 77–70, on February 7, at West Point. The win was Le Moyne's 65th all-time over a Division I/major program, and it would ultimately prove to be the final time Le Moyne defeated a Division I team as a Division II program.

Len Rauch had a triple-double with 24 points, 10 rebounds and 10 assists, leading the Dolphins to their fifth straight win, 94–73, over Buffalo on February 22. The victory was Le Moyne's 10th in their last 12 games, improving their record to 15–10 overall and 6–5 in MECC play, tied for fourth place with Adelphi. The Dolphins still had a chance at the fourth seed and home-court advantage in the MECC quarterfinals. Seniors Dave Niland and Steve Lauer left the floor in their final regular-season home game to a rousing ovation with 57 seconds remaining.

Entering their regular-season finale at Philadelphia Textile, ranked no. 16 in Division II, on February 25, the Dolphins would be assured of home-court advantage for the MECC tournament quarterfinals with a win and a Buffalo win over last-place Mercyhurst. A Gannon win over Adelphi the following day would also have given the Dolphins the fourth seed in the MECC tournament. The regular-season champion Rams built a 12-point lead in the game's first 12 minutes, and Le Moyne never got closer than five points down the rest of the way, and Philadelphia Textile cruised to an 86–61 victory. Len Rauch scored 17 points to lead Le Moyne. The following day, Adelphi defeated Gannon, 79–76, clinching the third seed in the MECC tournament and sealing Le Moyne into the fifth seed.

The Dolphins were dominated in their MECC quarterfinal game at Pace, losing 79–61 on March 4. Andy Bechtle scored 13 points to lead Le Moyne. The Dolphins finished the 1988–89 season 15–12.

Len Rauch was named 1989 MECC sophomore of the year. Rauch was also named to the Division II All-East team by the National Association of Basketball Coaches.

== Herhusky scores while Beilein and Rauch feud (1989–1990) ==
The Dolphins lost Dave Niland and Steve Lauer to graduation in 1989, but all five starters returned. Seniors Russell Barnes, Paul Rooney and Jim Cunningham, juniors Len Rauch, Julius Edwards, Andy Bechtle and Matt Lucas and sophomores Bob Piddock and John Peyrebrune were all back for the 1989–90 season. Redshirt sophomore Tom Herhusky, a 6'2" point guard, who sat out the previous season after transferring from St. Lawrence, became eligible. John Haas, a 6'1" guard from Christian Brothers Academy was added to the team. Haas had played center as a high school senior before moving to point guard, because his coach thought he was the team's best ball handler. Haas had earned all-state recognition in football and had the opportunity to play receiver at Holy Cross. Le Moyne head coach John Beilein described Haas as an A student, who was likely to improve after concentrating on basketball. Haas averaged 21.2 points per game as a high school senior. Christian Buchholz, a 6'5" forward from Frontier Central High School, also joined the team. Buchholz was a first-team All-Western New York player who averaged 20 points and nine rebounds per game as a high school senior. Walk-on John Scanlon made the team. Cunningham, who had originally made the team as a walk-on freshman, was named team captain for his senior season.

The 1989–90 season was the last under the leadership of Tommy Niland, Le Moyne's athletic director since 1947, and the head basketball coach for the program's first 25 varsity seasons. By September 1989, a search was underway for a replacement for Niland, who announced he would retire at the end of June 1990. In January 1990, long-time Le Moyne baseball coach Dick Rockwell was chosen as Niland's successor.

The Dolphins opened their season at the First Citizens Classic in Mansfield, Pennsylvania against Clarion on November 17. Le Moyne trailed, 55–44, with 10 minutes to play, when Tom Herhusky sparked a 21–11 run to close the game, but the Dolphins came up short, falling to the Golden Eagles, 66–65. Herhusky scored 12 points to lead Le Moyne but missed a pair of free throws with three seconds remaining, sealing Clarion's victory. Julius Edwards scored 20 points to lead the Dolphins to a 78–55 victory over Queens in the consolation game the following evening.

The Dolphins hosted the opening round of the Coca-Cola Classic on December 8, and used a man-to-man defense to hold Davis & Elkins to just 12 second-half points, while exploding for 49 points of their own in an 87–34 victory. Le Moyne's close guarding held the Senators to 21% shooting from the floor, and junior reserve forward Andy Bechtle drew three charging fouls on Davis & Elkins players in the first half. Len Rauch had 19 points, 18 rebounds and four assists, team highs in all three categories for Le Moyne. The following evening, the Dolphins were nursing a four-point lead with seven minutes to play, when they went on a 9–0 run to break open the championship game against Sacred Heart. The Pioneers battled back and got within six points at 78–72 with 25 seconds to play, but the Dolphins won the game, 80–72. Rauch scored 18 points, grabbed eight rebounds and dished out three assists and was the tournament most valuable player. Julius Edwards scored 21 points to lead the Le Moyne and joined Rauch on the all-tournament team. The win was the Dolphins' sixth straight, improving their record to 6–1 on the season.

The Dolphins dropped an 84–66 decision to West Chester in the opening round of the Bentley College Holiday Festival on December 28. Len Rauch scored 13 points to lead Le Moyne and reached 1,000 points scored in his collegiate career. The following evening, Julius Edwards and Tom Herhusky each scored 13 points to lead the Dolphins to a 72–63 victory over Queens in the consolation game.

Tom Herhusky scored 35 points on 14-for-18 shooting from the floor, including 7 for 10 from three-point range, and snatched four rebounds while handing out five assists to lead the Dolphins to a 110–95 home win over Adelphi on February 3, 1990. After Le Moyne opened a 28–16 lead, the Panthers battled back and trailed, 55–50, at halftime. With the Dolphins' lead at 74–72, a three-pointer by Herhusky sparked a 7–0 run that stretched Le Moyne's lead back to nine points. Len Rauch scored 22 points and grabbed nine rebounds for the Dolphins, while Russell Barnes finished with 17 points and four assists. Le Moyne improved to 12–6 overall and 3–4 in MECC play with the win.

Russell Barnes scored 15 points, reaching 1,000 for his collegiate career, in the Dolphins' 97–83 home victory over Saint Rose on February 21. Le Moyne stars Len Rauch, the team's leading scorer, and Julius Edwards were suspended by head coach John Beilein for disciplinary reasons. Beilein issued a statement indicating he was concerned about Rauch's lack of self-discipline in games and practices. Edwards was suspended for missing two practices after being told he would not start the game. Freshman John Haas started in place of Edwards and responded with 20 points on 8-for-9 shooting from the floor, including 2 for 3 from three-point range, six rebounds, five assists, two steals and a blocked shot in his first collegiate start.

The Dolphins got 30 points from Tom Herhusky and defeated Mercyhurst, 81–67, on February 24. Len Rauch and Julius Edwards returned to the lineup after being suspended for the previous game. Rauch started at center, and Edwards came off the bench with John Haas starting at shooting guard. Haas scored four points, and Edwards had eight. Herhusky shot 11 for 14 from the field. The Dolphins pulled away from the Lakers with a 6–0 run that gave them a 65–59 lead with seven minutes to play. Senior captain Jim Cunningham, who scored 12 points on 5-for-5 shooting from the floor, sparked the run with a jump shot. Rauch made a slick pass to Herhusky for an easy layup. Cunningham capped the spurt with a pair of free throws, and Le Moyne led the rest of the game. Rauch scored only six points but had eight rebounds and nine assists. The Dolphins improved to 16–8 overall and 5–6 in MECC play.

The Dolphins controlled nearly all of their home and regular-season finale against Pace on March 2, but the Setters took their first lead of the game with two seconds remaining and escaped with a 60–58 win. Le Moyne had possession of the ball and a 58–55 lead with 1:06 to play, but Len Rauch's backdoor pass was out of the reach of Russell Barnes and sailed out of bounds with 25 seconds on the 45-second shot clock and 46 seconds on the game clock. With Jim Cunningham draped over him, Bert Brisbane made an incredible three-point shot to tie the score at 58 with 25 seconds left. Barnes then missed a 13-foot jump shot, and the rebound was grabbed by Rodney Reese, who was fouled by Barnes. Reese hit both ends of the one-and-one to provide the winning margin. Seniors Barnes and Cunningham each scored 10 points in their final home game. Senior Paul Rooney scored one point. Tom Herhusky scored 11 points to lead Le Moyne. Rauch had nine points, 10 rebounds and six assists for the Dolphins, who fell to 16–10 overall and 5–7 in the MECC. Le Moyne finished tied for fifth in the conference standings with Buffalo, who won both games versus the Dolphins, earning the tiebreaker. Adelphi finished fourth in the league but was under NCAA sanctions and not eligible for the MECC tournament. Therefore, Buffalo was seeded fourth and Le Moyne fifth.

The Dolphins faced Buffalo on the home court of regular-season champion Gannon, which had been chosen as host of the tournament prior to the season, in the MECC quarterfinals on March 8. Le Moyne's zone defense surprised the Bulls, holding them to 31% shooting from the floor, and Len Rauch and Bob Piddock provided an effective inside-outside game on the offensive end, leading the Dolphins to a 67–45 victory, avenging their two regular-season losses to Buffalo. Rauch had a game-high 16 points and snatched 12 rebounds, and Piddock scored 13 points, hitting three three-pointers. Tom Herhusky added 14 points for the Dolphins, who shot 55% from the floor. Le Moyne controlled the glass, outrebounding Buffalo, 38–23.

The Dolphins fell behind by five points with 4:16 to play in their MECC semifinal game at Gannon on March 9, on an off-balance three-pointer by Chris Hollan with one second left on the shot clock and were unable to recover, falling, 55–53. Len Rauch scored 18 points and grabbed 10 rebounds to lead Le Moyne, and Tom Herhusky added 16 points.

The MECC tournament third-place game went to overtime, and Russell Barnes hit a deep three-pointer to give the Dolphins an early lead, but Philadelphia Textile controlled things from there, building a four-point lead by the closing minute. Julius Edwards hit a three-pointer at the buzzer that was not enough, and Le Moyne fell, 69–68. Len Rauch scored 17 points and grabbed 12 rebounds to lead the Dolphins, who finished their season 17–12.

Len Rauch was named 1990 first-team All-MECC, and Tom Herhusky was named to the second team.

== Rauch is program's top scorer and rebounder (1990–1991) ==
Russell Barnes was the only Dolphin starter to graduate in 1990. Also graduating were reserves Paul Rooney and captain Jim Cunningham. Redshirt senior Julius Edwards was on pace to graduate in December 1990, but delayed it to play his full senior season. Seniors Len Rauch, Andy Bechtle and Matt Lucas, juniors Bob Piddock and Tom Herhusky and sophomores John Haas and Christian Buchholz all returned. Freshmen added to the team included Joe Girard, a 5'10" shooting guard, who scored over 2,000 points at Shenendehowa High School, Dan Sandel, a 6'7" center from Notre Dame College School in Welland, Ontario, Canada, Andre Dearing, a 5'10" point guard from Fordham Preparatory School and 6'7" forward Kale Gray. Sandel was a dual citizen of the United States and Canada. Edwards had surgery on his right knee during the off-season but, when practices began on October 15, was expected to be available by early November. As the season approached, head coach John Beilein said Edwards had missed too much of training camp and was not yet in good enough shape to start the opener. He was replaced in the lineup by Girard. Former Dolphin Pete Jerebko was added to the staff as an assistant coach.

Before the season, Adelphi, which was playing basketball in the MECC while also a member of the New York Collegiate Athletic Conference (NYCAC), moved its basketball program to the NYCAC. Pace and Philadelphia Textile also announced they would leave the MECC for the NYCAC following the 1990–91 season. This was the final season for Buffalo as a Division II team in its transition from Division III to Division I, which meant Buffalo would leave the MECC as well. Le Moyne, Gannon and Mercyhurst would be the only three programs remaining in the conference, and the future of the league was uncertain.

After starting the season with a pair of home victories over Division III opponents, the Dolphins fell, 81–69, to South Carolina Spartanburg in the opening round of the Observer–Reporter Invitational, hosted by California (PA) on November 30. John Haas scored 16 points to lead Le Moyne. The following evening, freshman Joe Girard scored 26 points on 8-for-12 shooting from three-point range to lead the Dolphins to a 92–61 win over Queens in the third-place game. The eight triples matched the program's all-time single-game record.

The Dolphins hosted the opening round of the Coca-Cola Classic on December 7, and defeated Southampton, 81–67. With Le Moyne leading, 35–30, late in the first half, the Colonials were holding for the final shot. Tom Herhusky, who scored 22 points to lead the Dolphins, stole the ball and scored on a fast-break reverse dunk at the buzzer. Le Moyne stretched the lead to 14 points during the first 1:41 of the second half and controlled the game the rest of the way. In the other tournament opener, West Chester defeated Wheeling Jesuit, 84–66, which meant Le Moyne head coach John Beilein would not get an opportunity to coach against his alma mater for the first time in his career. The following night, the Dolphins built a 10-point lead at intermission before West Chester worked their way back into the game, cutting the Dolphins' lead to four points with 17 seconds to play. Solid free-throw shooting, led by Len Rauch, who was 4 for 4 over the final 1:15, helped Le Moyne hold off the Golden Rams, 72–65. Herhusky scored 22 points, grabbed six rebounds and had five assists and three steals, claiming tournament most valuable player honors. Rauch had a double-doule with 18 points and 13 rebounds and joined Herhusky on the all-tournament team. Christian Buchholz had six points and seven steals for the Dolphins, who improved to 5–1 on the season.

Tom Herhusky scored 30 points and grabbed 11 rebounds, but the Dolphins fell, 84–78, to Southeastern Massachusetts in the opening round of the Pepsi Invitational hosted by Merrimack on December 28. The following evening, Len Rauch scored 16 points to help the Dolphins overcome an eight-point second-half deficit and defeat Montclair State, 63–58, in the third-place game.

Len Rauch scored 19 points and grabbed 12 rebounds to lead the Dolphins to a 76–70 victory over host Springfield in the opening round of the Springfield Holiday Inn Naismith Classic on January 4, 1991. The following evening, Rauch had a double-double with 28 points and 14 rebounds and added seven assists to lead Le Moyne to the tournament title with a 100–80 victory over Norfolk State. Rauch was named tournament most valuable player. John Haas, with 23 points and six rebounds, and Joe Girard, who scored 14 points, joined Rauch on the all-tournament team.

The Dolphins set a new program record for three-point field goals made in a game with 18 on 27 attempts and cruised to a 101–70 victory at Mercyhurst on January 25, their seventh straight win and 11th in 12 games. Tom Herhusky scored 24 points and was 7 for 8 from three-point range to lead Le Moyne, which improved to 13–2 overall and 3–0 in MECC play. The following evening at Gannon, the Dolphins controlled the game most of the way, but a late charge by the Golden Knights capped by a late Darryl Freeman jump shot sent the contest to overtime. With the score tied at 84, Gary Douglas hit a 35-foot bank-shot three-pointer to give Gannon an 87–84 victory. Herhusky scored 22 points to lead the Dolphins.

Tom Herhusky scored 23 points to lead the Dolphins to a 105–81 victory over St. Lawrence on February 12, improving Le Moyne's record to 16–5. With 1:47 remaining in the first half, Len Rauch grabbed the 1,029th carom of his career and became Le Moyne's all-time leading career rebouder. The action was halted momentarily as Rauch held the game ball and posed for a photo with Dolphins head coach John Beilein. Rauch finished with 13 points, 14 rebounds, four assists and four steals.

Len Rauch had a triple-double with 22 points, 16 rebounds and 10 assists to lead the Dolphins to a 95–71 victory over Mercyhurst in their regular-season home finale on February 23. The win improved Le Moyne's record to 17–8 overall and 5–4 in MECC play and gave the Dolphins an opportunity to clinch home-court advantage for their MECC quarterfinal game.

Len Rauch became Le Moyne's all-time leading career scorer, and the Dolphins clinched the no. 3 seed in their conference tournament and home-court advantage for their MECC quarterfinal game with an 80–65 victory at Buffalo on March 2. Tom Herhusky scored 30 points to lead Le Moyne. Rauch finished with 25 points to bring his career total to 1,826. The Dolphins held the Bulls scoreless for three minutes late in the second half to break open a close game.

Tom Herhusky scored 20 points, and Len Rauch had a double-double with 16 points, 16 rebounds, seven assists and three steals, as the Dolphins cruised to an 86–58 victory over Mercyhurst in the MECC quarterfinals on March 5. Christian Buchholz added 16 points, four rebounds, four assists and three steals for Le Moyne. Rauch passed the 500-career-assist threshold in the contest.

The Dolphins could not overcome a six-minute scoreless stretch in the first half and fell to Pace, 87–68, in the MECC semifinals on the home court of no. 1 seed Philadelphia Textile on March 8. John Haas scored 17 points to lead Le Moyne, and Len Rauch finished with 14 points and a game-high nine rebounds. The Dolphins completed their season the following day with an 86–84 overtime loss to Gannon. Le Moyne trailed by three points with 37 seconds remaining in overtime, when Rauch went to the free-throw line and missed both shots. However, he grabbed the rebound, scored, was fouled and completed the three-point play to tie the game. A layup at the buzzer by Derrick Price won the game for the Golden Knights. Rauch and Haas each scored 20 points in the game. Haas was named to the all-tournament team. The Dolphins finished the season 19–10.

Len Rauch was named third-team Division II All-America, the first player in program history to be named an All-American by the National Association of Basketball Coaches, and All-East District II second team. Rauch was also 1991 MECC player of the year and first-team All-MECC. Joe Girard was MECC rookie of the year. Tom Herhusky was second-team All-MECC.

== Montesano arrives (1991–1992) ==
Practices for the 1991–92 season began on October 15, 1991. The Dolphins lost Len Rauch, the program's all-time leading career scorer and rebounder, Julius Edwards, Andy Bechtle and Matt Lucas to graduation. Seniors Bob Piddock and Tom Herhusky, juniors John Haas and Christian Buchholz and sophomores Joe Girard, Dan Sandel and Andre Dearing all returned. Bob McFadden, a 6'6" forward from DeSales High School, who averaged 24 points and 11 rebounds as a senior, verbally committed to Le Moyne in early February 1991. Karl Radday, a 6'6" center from New Milford High School in Connecticut, who averaged 19 points and 12 rebounds as a senior, followed with a verbal commitment later that month. In May, head coach John Beilein announced that McFadden and Radday had signed along with Mike Montesano, a 6'3" guard from McQuaid Jesuit High School, who was seventh-team All-New York State and averaged 19 points, five rebounds and seven assists. Also added to the team were walk-ons Jim Brindle, a freshman, and Rick Setticase, a sophomore. Herhusky and Piddock were named co-captains. Piddock was out indefinitely at the start of the season with a hamstring injury. Girard was suspended by the NCAA for the first two games of the season for playing in an unsanctioned summer league, an infraction self-reported by Le Moyne.

Dolphins assistant coach Mike Rizzi left to become the head coach at Onondaga Community College. Former Nazareth player Kevin Broderick, who graduated in 1989, joined Pete Jerebko as head coach John Beilein's new assistant, giving the Dolphins a pair of notably young assistant coaches.

Following the dissolution of the MECC, Le Moyne announced that the Dolphins would play the 1991–92 season as an independent, and the men's and women's basketball and men's soccer teams would join the New England Collegiate Conference (NECC) in 1992.

After several years without radio coverage, WVOA-FM planned to broadcast all Dolphins games live with Peter Stoyan, a 1991 Le Moyne graduate, handling the play by play. The season's first two games were not broadcast because of a lack of funding from sponsors.

The Dolphins opened the season with an 84–81 victory over Sacred Heart in the opening round of the Desmond Americana Tip Off Classic hosted by Saint Rose on November 22. Freshman Mike Montesano scored 18 points to lead Le Moyne. The following evening, the Dolphins took the tournament title with a 93–81 victory over Saint Rose. Tom Herhusky scored 25 points to lead Le Moyne and was named to the all-tournament team. John Haas added 24 points and was the tournament's most valuable player.

After starting the season with five games away from home and going 2–3, the Dolphins opened their home schedule with a 90–50 victory over Queens in the opening round of the Coca-Cola/Holiday Inn Carrier Circle Classic on December 6. Five Dolphins scored in double figures, led by Tom Herhusky, who had 21 points and six rebounds. The following evening, Le Moyne defeated Mansfield, 92–69, for the tournament title. Joe Girard scored 18 points and had two assists and two steals to lead the Dolphins. Tom Herhusky added 17 points and was named the tournament's most valuable player. John Haas had 14 points and joined Herhusky on the all-tournament team. The win improved Le Moyne's record to 4–3.

John Haas and Mike Montesano each scored 20 points to lead the Dolphins to a 91–88 victory over Bridgeport in the opening round of the Doc Jacobs Classic on December 28. The following day, Le Moyne fell to host Saint Michael's, 68–67, in overtime in the tournament final. Montesano scored 18 points, including three on a buzzer-beater at the end of regulation, and Haas had 11 points and a game-high nine assists. Both were selected to the all-tournament team.

The Dolphins overcame a 14-point halftime deficit and forced overtime against Franklin Pierce in the opening round of the Bloomsburg Invitational on January 10, 1992, but fell short, 84–80. Mike Montesano had a game-high 23 points for Le Moyne. Le Moyne had a chance to win the game in regulation, when Andre Dearing went to the line for a pair of free throws with no time on the clock, but he missed them both. Montesano scored 16 points to lead the Dolphins to an 81–65 victory over Alvernia the following evening in the third-place game. Montesano was named to the all-tournament team.

Once it was clear that Le Moyne was out of contention for an NCAA tournament berth, head coach John Beilein gave more playing time to his younger players, and senior co-captain Tom Herhusky lost his starting role. The lineup adjustment proved successful, and the Dolphins closed their season on February 29, with a 66–64 home victory over Mercyhurst, their seventh consecutive win. After the Lakers went on a late 8–0 run to take a 64–61 lead, Herhusky, who had 26 points on 10-for-14 shooting in his final collegiate game, tied the contest with a three-pointer. Mercyhurst's next possession produced a pair of missed free throws, and John Haas, who finished with 10 points, hit a driving layup at the buzzer to win the game for Le Moyne. Dan Sandel had seven points and 17 rebounds for the Dolphins, who finished the season 15–11.

Mike Montesano was named 1992 ECAC Division II co-rookie of the year.

On April 9, 1992, John Beilein stepped down as head coach of the Dolphins to take the same position at Canisius, a team he had followed as a child. In nine years at Le Moyne, Beilein finished 163–94. His .634 winning percentage was the best for any Dolphins head coach up to that point.

== See also ==
- History of Le Moyne Dolphins men's basketball (1983–1988)
- History of Le Moyne Dolphins men's basketball (1992–1997)
