= Scott Hicks =

Scott Hicks may refer to:

- Scott Hicks (basketball) (born 1966), American former college basketball coach
- Scott Hicks (director) (born 1953), Australian film director and screenwriter
