= 1989 North Atlantic Conference men's basketball tournament =

- Classification: Division I
- Season: 1988–89
- Teams: 8
- Site: Hartford Civic Center; Hartford, Connecticut
- Champions: Siena (1st title)
- Winning coach: Mike Deane (1st title)
- MVP: Marc Brown (Siena)
- North Atlantic Conference men's basketball tournaments

1988–89 North Atlantic Conference men's basketball standings
	Conf.				Overall
Team	W		L	PCT	W		L	PCT
Siena †	16	–	1	.941	25	–	5	.833
Boston University	14	–	4	.778	21	–	9	.700
Northeastern	12	–	5	.706	17	–	11	.607
Canisius	11	–	7	.611	13	–	15	.464
Hartford	10	–	7	.588	15	–	13	.536
Maine	7	–	11	.389	9	–	19	.321
Niagara	6	–	12	.333	9	–	19	.321
Colgate	5	–	13	.278	6	–	22	.214
Vermont	4	–	14	.222	6	–	21	.222
New Hampshire	3	–	14	.176	4	–	22	.154
† 1989 NAC tournament winner

The 1989 North Atlantic Conference men's basketball tournament was hosted by the Hartford Hawks at the Hartford Civic Center. Only the top-8 schools made it to the 1989 tournament, therefore excluding both New Hampshire and Vermont. Siena College gained its only America East Conference Championship and an automatic berth to the NCAA tournament with its win over Boston University. Siena was given the 14th seed in the East Regional of the NCAA Tournament and lost in the second round to Minnesota 80–67, after upsetting #3 Stanford 80–78.

== Bracket and Results ==
Quarterfinals
1	Siena	61
8	Colgate	51
4	Canisius	57
5	Hartford	75
3	Northeastern	65
6	Maine	59
2	Boston U.	96
7	Niagara	58

Semifinals
1	Siena	81
5	Hartford	57
3	Northeastern	84
2	Boston U.	101

Finals
1	Siena	68
2	Boston U.	67

== See also ==
- America East Conference
