= Mike Deane =

American basketball coach (born 1951)

Personal information
- Born: September 28, 1951 (age 75) Stony Point, New York, U.S.
- Listed height: 6 ft 2 in (1.88 m)
- Listed weight: 180 lb (82 kg)

Career information
- High school: North Rockland (Thiells, New York)
- College: SUNY Potsdam (1971–1974)
- NBA draft: 1974: 9th round, 161st overall pick
- Drafted by: Milwaukee Bucks
- Position: Guard
- Number: 24
- Coaching career: 1974–2017

Career history

Coaching
- 1974–1975: SUNY Potsdam (assistant)
- 1975–1976: SUNY Plattsburgh (assistant)
- 1976–1980: SUNY Delhi (assistant)
- 1980–1982: SUNY Oswego
- 1982–1986: Michigan State (assistant)
- 1986–1994: Siena
- 1994–1999: Marquette
- 1999–2003: Lamar
- 2003–2010: Wagner
- 2012–2017: James Madison (assistant)

Career highlights
- 2x ECACN/NAC regular-season champion (1988–1989); NAC tournament champion (1989); NAC Coach of the Year (1989); MAAC regular-season champion (1991); C-USA tournament champion (1997); Southland tournament champion (2000)
- Stats at Basketball Reference

Career coaching record
- NCAA overall: 436–334 (.566)
- NCAA Division I tournament: 2–4 (.333)
- NIT: 12–5 (.706)

Mike Deane (born September 27, 1951) is an American college basketball coach who most recently was a men's assistant coach at James Madison University. He retired at the end of the 2017 basketball season. He was previously head basketball coach at Wagner College and was relieved of his duties on March 1, 2010, after which he took a two-year hiatus from the game. He had also held the head coach position at Siena College, Marquette University, and Lamar University.

Deane is from Rockland County, New York, and attended Potsdam State University, where he was a small college All-American and began his career as a coach in 1974. He later coached at Oswego State and had his first Division 1 position at Michigan State University and his first job as head coach at Siena, from 1986 to 1994. He recorded his 400th career victory on December 15, 2007, against the University of Maryland Eastern Shore. He has coached three different Division I schools to the NCAA Tournament (Siena, Marquette, and Lamar). His Siena team upset Stanford in the 1989 NCAA Tournament in the first round of the East Region.

Deane has produced two NBA products in his career (both at Marquette: Chris Crawford and Amal McCaskill).

== Head coaching record ==
Record table
Season	Team	Overall	Conference	Standing	Postseason
SUNY Oswego Great Lakers (Eastern College Athletic Conference) (1980–1982)
1980–81	SUNY Oswego	8–16			
1981–82	SUNY Oswego	16–10			
SUNY Oswego:		24–26 (.480)			
Siena Saints (ECAC North/North Atlantic Conference) (1986–1989)
1986–87	Siena	17–12	12–6	T–3rd	
1987–88	Siena	23–6	16–2	1st	NIT First Round
1988–89	Siena	25–5	16–1	1st	NCAA Division I Second Round
Siena Saints (Metro Atlantic Athletic Conference) (1989–1994)
1989–90	Siena	16–13	11–5	2nd	
1990–91	Siena	25–10	12–4	1st	NIT Quarterfinals
1991–92	Siena	19–10	11–5	3rd	
1992–93	Siena	16–13	8–6	4th	
1993–94	Siena	25–8	10–4	3rd	NIT 3rd Place
Siena:		166–77 (.683)	96–33 (.744)		
Marquette Golden Eagles (Great Midwest Conference) (1994–1995)
1994–95	Marquette	21–12	7–5	T–3rd	NIT Runner-up
Marquette Golden Eagles (Conference USA) (1995–1999)
1995–96	Marquette	23–8	10–4	2nd (Blue)	NCAA Division I Second Round
1996–97	Marquette	22–9	9–5	2nd (Blue)	NCAA Division I First Round
1997–98	Marquette	20–11	8–8	4th (American)	NIT Quarterfinals
1998–99	Marquette	14–15	6–10	6th (American)	
Marquette:		100–55 (.645)	40–32 (.556)		
Lamar Cardinals (Southland Conference) (1999–2003)
1999–00	Lamar	15–16	8–10	T–6th	NCAA Division I First Round
2000–01	Lamar	9–18	7–13	9th	
2001–02	Lamar	15–14	11–9	4th	
2002–03	Lamar	13–14	10–10	T–5th	
Lamar:		52–62 (.456)	36–42 (.462)		
Wagner Seahawks (Northeast Conference) (2003–2010)
2003–04	Wagner	13–16	8–10	T–4th	
2004–05	Wagner	14–16	8–10	T–4th	
2005–06	Wagner	13–14	6–12	10th	
2006–07	Wagner	11–19	8–10	7th	
2007–08	Wagner	23–8	15–3	2nd	
2008–09	Wagner	16–14	8–10	T–4th	
2009–10	Wagner	5–26	3–15	11th	
Wagner:		94–114 (.452)	56–72 (.438)		
Total:		436–334 (.566)			
National champion Postseason invitational champion Conference regular season champion Conference regular season and conference tournament champion Division regular season champion Division regular season and conference tournament champion Conference tournament champion
