= History of Le Moyne Dolphins men's basketball (1997–2000) =

NCAA Division I men's basketball team representing Le Moyne College

The history of Le Moyne Dolphins men's basketball from 1997 to 2000 includes the head coaching tenure of Dave Paulsen. After going 20–8 in Paulsen's first season, the Dolphins struggled with losing records in the next two campaigns. A loss in their 1998 conference tournament semifinal game kept Le Moyne out of the NCAA tournament. John Tomsich was an all-conference player as a junior and senior during the first two seasons of Paulsen's tenure. Michael Culley became the Dolphins' biggest star in his senior season, after Tomsich graduated, finishing as the program's all-time leader in three-point field goals made. However, Paulsen's third season was marred by a dismal 9–17 record that included the worst home loss in program history. This followed an epic collapse in 1998–99, that saw the Dolphins fall from first place in early February, closing the season with eight straight losses. Le Moyne lost 16 consecutive games against conference opponents between January 30, 1999 and January 17, 2000. Paulsen resigned in July 2000, to take the head coaching position at his alma mater, Division III Williams.

== Le Moyne's fifth 20-win season (1997–1998) ==
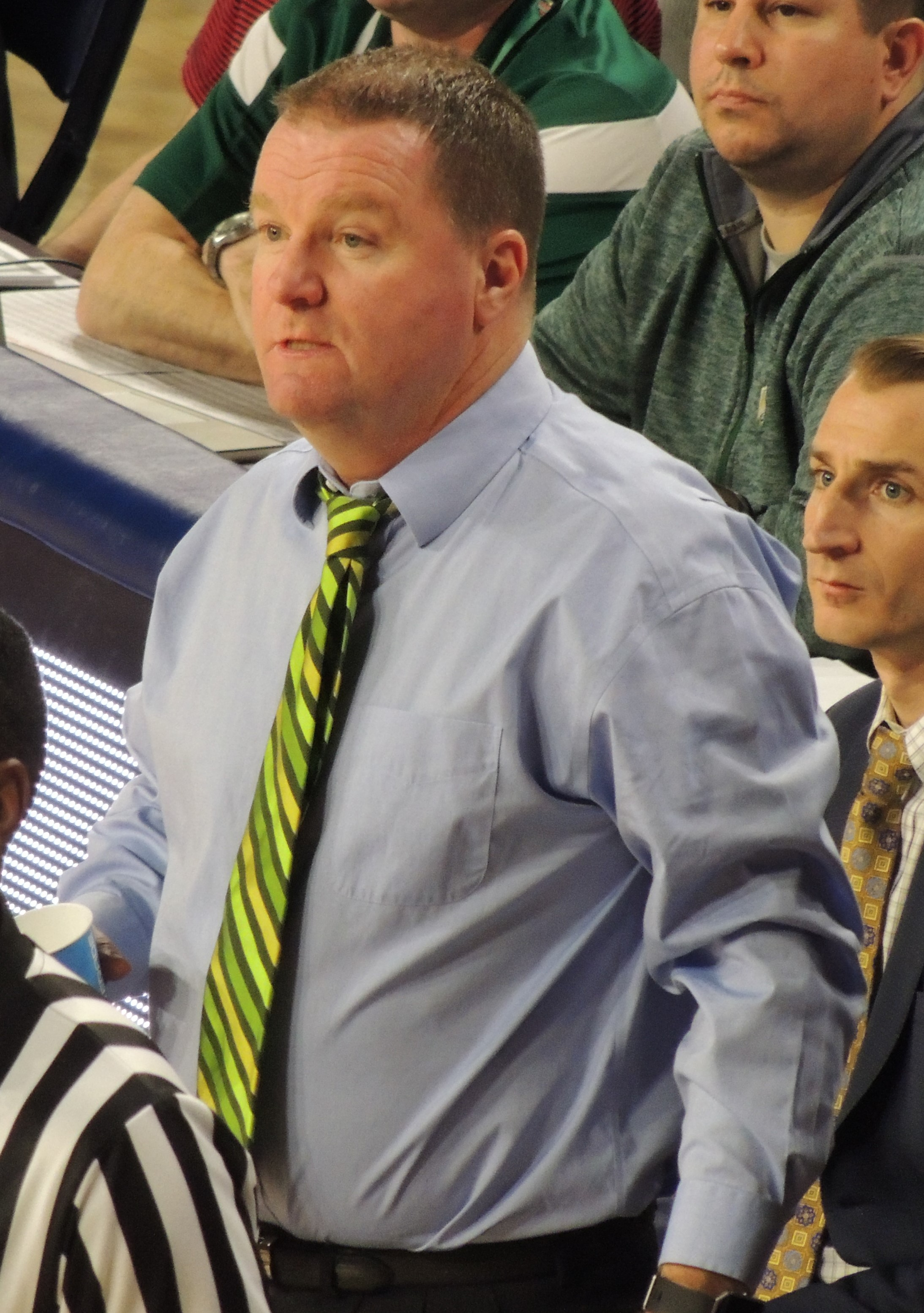
Dave Paulsen

On June 18, 1997, Le Moyne introduced Dave Paulsen as the Dolphins' new head coach, replacing the departed Scott Hicks. Paulsen, 32 years old at the time, had been the head coach at St. Lawrence the previous three seasons with a record of 50–28 and was named Upstate Collegiate Athletic Association coach of the year in each of the previous two campaigns. Assistant coaches Gallagher Driscoll and Sean McDonnell committed to remain on Paulsen's staff. Jim "Duke" McGrath, a Le Moyne alumnus from the class of 1962, joined the staff as a volunteer assistant coach. McGrath played on the Dolphins' 1958–59 freshman team but never played on the varsity squad. He played varsity baseball at Le Moyne for two seasons and was the team's co-captain during his senior year. McGrath had a successful 23-year career as a high school basketball coach. Tobin Anderson was also added to the staff as an assistant coach.

The Dolphins went on a foreign tour to London between August 9 and 19, 1997. Le Moyne played three teams from the British Basketball League, losing all three games, and earned a win against an amateur club team. Only returning players and not any newly recruited players were permitted by NCAA rules to make the trip.

Redshirt senior Bryan Menar and seniors Keith Moyer and Mike Ondrejko, a walk-on, returned for the 1997–98 season. John Henches had a year of eligibility remaining due to a medical redshirt, but he graduated and left the program. Also returning were juniors John Tomsich and Kevin Moyer, a walk-on, and sophomores Rashaan Bute, Michael Culley, Brett Doody and Jesse Potter. New to the team were sophomore walk-ons Shannon Flood, a 6'1" guard and Terry Pudney and freshmen A.J. Warren, a 6'1" swingman, Jakub Hrabovský, a 6'6" forward from the Czech Republic, and guard Ronald Garura. Menar, Keith Moyer and Tomsich were named tri-captains. First-year head coach Dave Paulsen planned to change the team's defensive approach from primarily zone to man-to-man and install a motion offense instead of running set plays. The players were receptive to the changes. Menar, who was a member of the committee that selected the new head coach, praised Paulsen's confidence, noting that was an important trait in a leader.

In an early-season battle of unbeatens, the Dolphins staged a furious rally to overcome an 18-point deficit with eight minutes to play at Assumption on November 29, 1997, and sent the game to overtime. Jesse Potter split a pair of free throws with seven seconds left to force the extra session. However, the Greyhounds dominated the overtime period and rescued a 105–92 victory. Freshman A.J. Warren keyed the comeback, scoring 12 of his career high 23 points during the final eight minutes of regulation, and added six steals. Keith Moyer scored 10 points and matched Le Moyne's program record with 13 assists. John Tomsich had 23 points, a career-high 16 rebounds and six blocked shots, becoming the Dolphins' all-time leader in career blocks with 158. Michael Culley scored 18 points, all of them coming on six triples. Potter finished with 10 points. Le Moyne fell to 4–1 overall and 1–1 in Northeast-10 Conference (NE10) play.

John Tomsich recorded his third straight 20-point double-double to lead the Dolphins to a 73–63 home victory over Saint Michael's, ranked no. 16 in the NCAA Division II Bulletin poll, on December 3. Tomsich had 16 points in the first half as Le Moyne built a 15-point lead at intermission. The Purple Knights made the game tighter in the second half, as the Dolphins struggled at the free-throw line, shooting 10 for 20, after they had been 8 for 12 in the first half. Tomsich finished with 20 points and 14 boards. Keith Moyer added 17 points and nine assists for Le Moyne, who improved to 5–2 overall and 2–2 in NE10 play.

John Tomsich scored 32 points in the Dolphins' 85–81 loss at Stonehill on January 5, 1998. Tomsich achieved his total despite fouling out of the game and committing six turnovers. Jesse Potter added four points, 13 rebounds, two steals and a block, and Keith Moyer had five points, eight assists and a block for Le Moyne, who fell to 8–3 overall and 4–3 in NE10 play.

Following the Dolphins' January 10 home game against Quinnipiac, head coach Dave Paulsen commented, "I told the guys that it's the mark of a good team to get an ugly win, and for that I was proud of them." Keith and Kevin Moyer and Jesse Potter all played through the flu. The game featured 54 personal fouls, and John Tomsich was called for his fourth two minutes into the second half. Senior walk-on Mike Ondrejko came off the bench and kept the game close with Tomsich sitting out in foul trouble. He scored eight points and grabbed a team-high seven rebounds, five of them off the offensive glass. When Tomsich returned to the floor with 5:57 to play, he was well rested and put his inside game on display. His basket with 1:56 remaining gave Le Moyne a 67–65 lead. After the Braves tied the score, Tomsich responded with another bucket to put the Dolphins ahead, 69–67, with 1:26 to go. A minute later, Tomsich sank a pair of free throws to ice a 71–67 victory for Le Moyne. Tomsich finished with 15 points, and Keith Moyer scored two points and dished nine assists for the Dolphins, who improved to 10–3 overall and 6–3 in NE10 play.

After a win at Merrimack on January 18, the Dolphins completed the sweep of a rare back-to-back home-and-home set with a 62–61 victory three days later. The Warriors scored the first 10 points of the second half to open an 11-point lead, but Le Moyne responded with a 24–4 run and held a nine-point edge with six minutes to play. Merrimack used a 15–6 spurt to tie the score at 61 in the final minute. John Tomsich was fouled with three seconds to play. He missed the first free throw but made the second. Jesse Potter stole a Merrimack pass to secure the win for the Dolphins. Tomsich finished with a game-high 21 points, 10 of them during Le Moyne's second-half run. Potter had four points and 10 rebounds, and Keth Moyer scored seven points and dished eight assists for the Dolphins, who improved to 12–4 overall and 8–4 in NE10 play.

The Dolphins avenged an early-season road loss with a convincing 91–79 home victory over first-place Assumption on January 24. After the Greyhounds took an early 10–3 lead, Le Moyne pushed ahead by the midpoint of the first half and built a nine-point lead by intermission. Assumption cut the lead to four points, holding the Dolphins without a field goal for the first 2:30 of the second stanza. Le Moyne responded with a 10–3 spurt, sparked by an A.J. Warren basket that broke the field-goal drought, and controlled the game the rest of the way. Warren had a career-high 28 points on 13-for-20 shooting from the floor. Walk-on junior guard Kevin Moyer came off the bench to score a career-high 17 points and was matched by John Tomsich, who had a double-double with 17 points and 15 rebounds. Keith Moyer added 12 points and six assists for the Dolphins, who improved to 13–4 overall and 9–4 in NE10 play, 1 1/2 games behind Assumption in the standings.

John Tomsich and Keith Moyer each had a double-double in the Dolphins' 96–86 home win over Bentley on January 25. Tomsich finished with a career-high 31 points and 12 rebounds, and Moyer had 12 points and a program record-tying 14 assists. Le Moyne led by as many as 12 points in the second half, but the hot-shooting Falcons got within three points with 1:27 to play. A layup by Tomsich with 1:02 left put the game away. Michael Culley added 20 points for the Dolphins, who improved to 14–4 overall and 10–4 in NE10 play.

John Tomsich was named NE10 player of the week for his performances in the three home games against Merrimack, Assumption and Bentley.

John Tomsich scored the game's opening basket, surpassing 1,000 career points, in the Dolphins' January 28 home tilt against Hobart. Le Moyne led by as many as 30 points, and their starters played sparingly in the second half of a 78–60 Dolphins victory. Tomsich finished with 16 points, shooting 8 for 8 from the field, and grabbed eight rebounds in only 23 minutes. Michael Culley had 17 points, and Keith Moyer added two points and nine assists for Le Moyne, which won their fifth straight game.

After trailing by five points at halftime at American International on February 1, the Dolphins battled back in the second half and had possession, facing a one-point deficit in the final seconds. Keith Moyer was fouled shooting a three-pointer and awarded three free throws with no time left on the clock. Moyer missed the first two tosses but made the third and sent the game to overtime. Le Moyne dominated the extra session and earned an 86–76 victory. John Tomsich led the Dolphins with 35 points and 18 rebounds before fouling out in overtime. Moyer finished with 14 points and four assists. Le Moyne improved to 16–5 overall and 11–5 in NE10 play.

Stonehill, ranked no. 21 in the NCAA Division II Bulletin poll, visited the Dolphins on February 9, in a battle for first place in the NE10. Le Moyne's defense frustrated the Chieftains in the first half, and the Dolphins built a 38–30 lead at the break. Stonehill's shooting improved in the second half, and they ended up 37% from the floor for the game. The Chieftains tied the score at 60, but an A.J. Warren layup but Le Moyne back in front. After Stonehill got within a point at 66–65, the Dolphins responded with a 7–2 spurt that included a Warren basket inside, Keith Moyer finding John Tomsich for a layup and a Michael Culley three-pointer. Le Moyne controlled the rest of the game, securing an 84–73 victory and first place in the conference. Tomsich finished with 25 points and 17 rebounds. Moyer had five points and nine assists, and Culley added 15 points. The Dolphins improved to 18–5 overall and 13–5 in NE10 play.

Despite a 31-point, 12-rebound effort from John Tomsich, the Dolphins lost, 87–82, at NAIA Division I Roberts Wesleyan on February 11. The Raiders built their lead as large as 15 points in the first half. Le Moyne got back into the game and tied the score at 69 but could not push in front. Keith Moyer missed a three-pointer that would have tied the game with five seconds to play. Roberts Wesleyan then hit a pair fo free throws to seal their victory. The Raiders improved to 10–16 with the win, which likely damaged Le Moyne's chances for an at-large bid to the NCAA tournament.

After taking a 29–27 lead at halftime of their February 14 game at Pace, the Dolphins collapsed in the second half, getting outscored, 69–34, and lost, 96–63. The Setters finished the game shooting 52% from the field. John Tomsich scored 13 points and grabbed eight rebounds to lead Le Moyne. Keith Moyer added 12 points and six assists. The loss dropped the Dolphins out of first place with an overall record of 18–7 and a league mark of 13–6.

The Dolphins finished tied for second place in the NE10 and were the no. 3 seed in the 1998 NE10 tournament and hosted no. 6 seed Saint Michael's in a quarterfinal game on February 23. Le Moyne entered the game having lost two of their final three regular-season games, but the Dolphins were well rested, having not played since eight days earlier. Le Moyne's man-to-man defense held the Purple Knights to 38% shooting in the first half and triggered runs of 12–2 and 17–4, allowing the Dolphins to take a 50–33 lead at the intermisson. Saint Michael's improved their shooting in the second half and appeared on the verge of getting back into the game on several occasions. However, each time the Purple Knights got close, Keith and Kevin Moyer responded to quash the rally. After Saint Michael's cut the lead to 64–52, the Moyer brothers each hit a triple during a 6–2 spurt that pushed the lead back to 16 points. The Purple Knights went on a 10–2 run to get within 10 points at 76–66. The Moyer brothers responded by scoring the game's next four points on a drive to the basket by Kevin and a pair fo free throws by Keith. Saint Michael's made one final push and got within 10 points with three minutes to go. Keith Moyer sparked a 5–2 spurt with a pair of free throws and a three-point play that put the game out of reach. The Moyer brothers finished 17 for 17 from the free throw line, and Keith was 11 for 11. John Tomsich had a double-double for Le Moyne with 29 points and 10 rebounds. Keith Moyer had a career-high 23 points and dished six assists, and Michael Culley added 20 points for the Dolphins. Walk-on Kevin Moyer finished with 16 points, playing 26 minutes off the bench. The win, Le Moyne's 20th of the season, improved the Dolphins' home record to 16–0 in 1997–98, and was their 17th straight victory at the Henninger Athletic Center dating back to the 1996–97 campaign.

The Dolphins visited no. 2 seed Assumption for their NE10 semifinal game on February 25. Midway through the second half of a tight game, Mike Ondrejko's layup cut the Greyhounds' lead to 67–63. Assumption then embarked on a 17–4 run and controlled the rest of the game, earning a 102–84 win. Although the Dolphins held opponents to 40.2% field-goal shooting during the season, ranking among the leaders in Division II and the best in the NE10, the Greyhounds shot 48% from the floor and 42% from beyond the arc. Junior tri-captain John Tomsich had his 12th double-double of the season with 20 points and 13 rebounds for Le Moyne. Senior tri-captain and point guard Keith Moyer finished with seven points and seven assists in his final collegiate game. Ondrejko, a walk-on senior, had four points. Moyer's brother Kevin, a walk-on junior, had 16 points. Redshirt senior tri-captain Bryan Menar scored two points. The Dolphins finished the season 20–8, reaching the 20-win plateau for the fifth time in the 50-year history of the program, all of which occurred during the most recent 15 seasons.

John Tomsich was named first-team All-NE10 and to the Division II All-Northeast Region team. Keith Moyer led the NE10 in assists per game with 7.7, which ranked him seventh in Division II.

== Epic collapse (1998–1999) ==
Effective for the 1998–99 academic year, Le Moyne instituted a random drug testing program for all student-athletes. Le Moyne planned to apply for membership in the Metro Atlantic Athletic Conference (MAAC) and transition to Division I, where drug testing was required. The baseball team had been competing in Division I since 1987, and the women's lacrosse team moved to Division I in 1998.

The Dolphins lost Keith Moyer, their starting point guard, Bryan Menar and Mike Ondrejko to graduation in 1998. John Tomsich and now former walk-on Kevin Moyer returned for their senior seasons along with juniors Michael Culley, Jesse Potter, Rashaan Bute and walk-on Shannon Flood and sophomore Jakub Hrabovský. Alex Harris, a 6'9" junior transfer forward from Division I American was new to the team. Harris was named to the Colonial Athletic Association All-Rookie team in 1997. Freshman Steve Vega, a 5'7" guard, was expected to get significant playing time backing up Kevin Moyer at the point. He averaged 33.5 points, 6.7 rebounds and 5.1 assists per game at Avon High School in Ohio. Tom Patton, a 6'0" guard who averaged 18.5 points per game as a high school senior in Cleveland was also new to the team. Nick Redhead, a 5'11" walk-on freshman guard from Paul V. Moore High School, was a first-team all-league selection as a high school senior. After playing his freshman season at Le Moyne, A.J. Warren transferred to New Jersey Tech. Tomsich and Moyer were named co-captains.

The Dolphins led their November 19, 1998 season opener by two points after a sluggush first half, but their shooting heated up in the second stanza, and they earned a 65–54 home victory over Glenville State. John Tomsich scored 31 points, grabbed 16 rebounds and blocked seven shots to lead Le Moyne. Tomsich played the entire 40 minutes and held Glenville State's Terry Clark, who entered the game averaging 32 points per contest, to 10 points on 5-for-14 shooting. Kevin Moyer had 12 points and five assists in his first game as the Dolphins' starting point guard. Steve Vega did not score but had five assists in his collegiate debut.

The Dolphins' 18-game home winning streak was on the line, when they trailed East Stroudsburg, 69–62, with 4:24 to play on November 21. Le Moyne responded with a 10–0 run over the next four minutes and led, 72–69, with 10 seconds left. The Dolphins elected to foul Ro Trachtman to prevent a three-point attempt, and he hit both free throws to cut the lead to one point. The Warriors immediately fouled John Tomsish, who split a pair of charity tosses to put Le Moyne ahead, 73–71. East Stroudsburg then ran a play for Trachtman, who was 11th in Division II in three-point percentage the previous season, and he hit a triple at the buzzer to give the Warriors a 74–73 victory, ending the Dolphins' home winning treak. Tomsich scored 27 points, grabbed 16 rebounds and blocked two shots to lead Le Moyne, and Kevin Moyer added 12 points and five assists.

John Tomsich was named NE10 player of the week for his performances against Glenville State and East Stroudsburg.

With John Tomsich sidelined with a sprained ankle he suffered in practice, Alex Harris scored 24 points and snatched nine rebounds to lead the Dolphins to a 73–55 home win over Bentley on December 5. Le Moyne held the Falcons to 32% shooting from the field and to their lowest scoring output in 12 years. Kevin Moyer scored 10 points and dished five assists, and Jesse Potter added nine points and five assists for the Dolphins, who improved to 3–2 overall and 1–1 in NE10 play.

Michael Culley scored 28 points, shooting 8 for 10 from three-point range, to lead the Dolphins to a 90–68 victory over Lincoln Memorial in the opener of the AmeriHost Tournament, hosted by Ashland University on December 29. The Dolphins held the Railsplitters to 23% shooting in the first half to take an 18-point lead at the break. All 11 players on Le Moyne's roster scored in the game. John Tomsich scored 17 points on 8-for-10 shooting from the floor and grabbed five rebounds. Kevin Moyer had four points and dished 11 assists. Freshman Tom Patton recorded four points and a team-high seven rebounds. The Dolphins had 34 assists on their 38 made field goals. Le Moyne improved to 6–3 on the season.

The following evening, Ashland raced to an early 12-point lead before a late first-half run by the Dolphins tied the score at intermission. The Eagles had the lead in the closing seconds, and a missed three-pointer by Michael Culley, whom Ashland held to just five points, ended the drama in a 60–56 win for the Eagles, giving the hosts the tournament title. John Tomsich scored 16 points for Le Moyne before fouling out with 3:45 to play. Kevin Moyer finished with 11 points and five assists, and Jesse Potter added 10 points and 13 rebounds. Culley and Tomsich were named to the all-tournament team.

Michael Culley scored 27 points to lead the Dolphins to a 91–62 victory over Queens (NY) in the opening game of the Doc Jacobs Classic, a showcase event hosted by Saint Michael's on January 2, 1999. Le Moyne dominated the first half, building a 27-point lead at the break. Kevin Moyer and Steve Vega each dished nine assists for Le Moyne. Moyer added eight points, and Vega scored three. John Tomsich recorded 10 points and 11 rebounds to post a double-double. Rahaan Bute came off the bench for Le Moyne to score nine points, grab eight rebounds and block three shots.

The following day, Nick Redhead scored a game-high 19 points, 16 of them in the second half, to lead the Dolphins to a 93–43 victory over Southern Vermont at the Doc Jacobs Classic. Le Moyne held the Mountaineers to 24% shooting from the floor in the first half and built a 21-point lead at intermission. The Dolphins shared the classic championship with Saint Michael's, which also went 2–0. Redhead shot 5 for 6 from three-point range. Rashaan Bute scored five points and grabbed nine rebounds for Le Moyne. Steve Vega had a team-high five assists. John Tomsich and Michael Culley were named to the all-classic team. The Dolphins improved to 8–4 on the season.

With the team's best outside shooter and second-leading scorer, Michael Culley, sidelined by the flu, Kevin Moyer stepped up and hit a triple with seven seconds left in double overtime to lead the Dolphins to an 88–85 victory at Pace, ranked no. 1 in the Northeast Region, on January 6. Moyer finished with a career-high 23 points and dished 11 assists. His free throws with 29 seconds left in the first overtime extended the game. John Tomsich set new career highs with 36 points and 20 rebounds. Le Moyne improved to 9–4 overall and 4–1 in NE10 play with their third straight win.

The Dolphins played their second straight double overtime game on January 9, at Merrimack. Kevin Moyer set another career high with 31 points and dished nine assists. Moyer's three-pointer with 18 seconds to play in regulation forced overtime. Le Moyne had the lead late in the first overtime but conceded a basket in the closing seconds. The Warriors seized control of the game in the second extra session and earned a 110–102 victory. John Tomsich finished with 20 points and 16 rebounds for the Dolphins before fouling out. Michael Culley returned from his bout with the flu and scored 19 points, shooting 5 for 12 from three-point range.

Kevin Moyer scored 29 points and dished nine assists, leading the Dolphins to an 85–83 upset victory at Saint Anselm, ranked no. 15 in the NCAA Division II Bulletin poll, on January 11. John Tomsich added 12 points and nine rebounds for Le Moyne. This was the final game of eight consecutive contests, five of them true road games, the Dolphins played away from home. Le Moyne went 34 days between home games and spent about 40 hours traveling 2,820 miles to play games in six different states. The Dolphins won five of the eight games on the road trip.

For the second straight game, the Dolphins survived a flat and sloppy performance in a home tilt and were rescued by John Tomsich on January 18. Tomsich scored 39 points, the most by a Le Moyne player in 28 years, and grabbed 13 rebounds in a 73–63 victory over Bryant. Tomisch was 11 for 18 from the field. The rest of the team shot 10 for 29 (34%). Kevin Moyer shot 2 for 7 and finished with four points and nine assists. Michael Culley was 1 for 5 from the floor and 7 for 8 from the free-throw line, recording 10 points. The Dolphins reached a season-high 12 games above .500 at 12–5 overall and 7–2 in NE10 play.

After Saint Michael's lost at Pace on January 20, the Dolphins and Purple Knights were tied for first place in the NE10 with 7–2 league records. However, Le Moyne fell out of first place with a 67–62 upset loss on January 23, at American International, who had entered the game with a 1–8 record in NE10 play. John Tomsich scored 22 points and snatched 13 rebounds, and Kevin Moyer had four points and 10 assists for the Dolphins.

John Tomisich was named NE10 and ECAC North player of the week for his performances against Bryant and American International.

The Dolphins capitalized on their opportunity to regain a share of first place with a 75–73 home victory over Saint Michael's on January 27. A late first-half rally by the Purple Knights cut Le Moyne's 11-point lead to three points at the break, setting up a tight second half. After Saint Michael's moved in front, 48–47, with 12:24 to play, the Dolphins responded with a 16–7 spurt, getting scoring from Jakub Hrabovský, John Tomsich, Kevin Moyer and Jesse Potter, to claim an eight-point lead with 6:27 remaining. The Purple Knights relied on their pressure defense, which forced 19 Le Moyne turnovers, to make a final push and got within 72–71 with 16 seconds left. Moyer hit a pair of free throws to extend the lead to three points. The Dolphins defended the three-point line aggressively, forcing Saint Michael's to drive to the basket, making the score 74–73. Tomsich made one of two from the charity stripe with three seconds left and then stole a pass on the Purple Knights' final possession, sealing the Dolphins' win. Tomsich finished with 21 points and 18 rebounds. Jesse Potter played the entire 40 minutes and scored 12 points, but his defense on Todd Roberts was most notable. Roberts entered the game averaging 18.5 points per contest. Potter defended him the entire game and held him without a shot attempt in the first half. Roberts scored only four points, shooting 2 for 5 from the field. Moyer finished with 14 points and five assists, but he struggled at times against the full-court pressure defense. Freshmen Steve Vega, Tom Patton and Nick Redhead each performed well spelling Moyer at the point. Vega finished with four points, all of them scored late as Saint Michael's was making their final push. The win improved the Dolphins' overall record to 13–6 and put them into a first-place tie with Saint Michael's at 8–3 in NE10 play.

The Dolphins had a 65–59 lead with 5:20 to play in their February 1 game at Stonehill. However, the Chieftains closed the game on a 17–8 run and earned a 76–73 win, ending their six-game losing streak and handing Le Moyne their second straight loss, which knocked the Dolphins out of a first-place tie. John Tomsich scored 36 points, grabbed 10 rebounds and dished five assists for Le Moyne. Tomsich shot 14 for 20 from the field; the rest of the team shot 14 for 41 (34%). The Dolphins committed 17 turnovers in the game. Le Moyne fell to 13–8 overall and 8–5 in NE10 play, tied for third place in the league.

Playing at home in their regular-season finale, the Dolphins were locked into a tight game with Pace, the top ranked team in the Northeast Region, on February 19. After just over 13 minutes had elapsed in the game, starting forward Alex Harris suffered what appeared to be a serious injury to his left knee. Harris had logged eight minutes and already grabbed seven rebounds in the game. He was, however, having a bad shooting night, having missed all six of his shots from the floor. The loss of the inside presence and depth Harris provided was quickly evident. The Setters' late first-half spurt gave them a five-point lead at the break. Less than four minutes into the second half, Pace had expanded their lead to 15 points. Le Moyne never got closer than eight points down the rest of the way, and the Setters earned an 85–72 victory. This was the final home game in the collegiate careers of senior co-captains John Tomsich and Kevin Moyer. Tomsich scored 23 points, grabbed 12 rebounds and dished three assists. He became the third player in program history to surpass 1,000 career rebounds. Moyer notched 13 points before fouling out. He was bothered by Pace's full-court press, committing eight of the Dolphins' 21 turnovers, which led to 28 points for the Setters. The loss was the seventh straight for Le Moyne, dropping them to 8–10 in NE10 play, tied for sixth place in the league. Just 18 days earlier, they took the court tied for first place. The Dolphins won the tiebreaker for the no. 6 seed in the conference tournament.

The Dolphins' epic collapse concluded with their eighth straight loss despite a valiant effort in the NE10 quarterfinals at no. 3 seed Saint Michael's on February 22. Despite John Tomsich being slowed by flu-like symptoms, Le Moyne managed a 10-point lead with 9:48 to play. The Purple Knights went on a run and flipped the game, moving ahead, 60–55, in the final minutes. Tom Patton responded for Le Moyne with two straight baskets, and the Dolphins trailed, 60–59, with 44 seconds to play. Le Moyne got a stop on the defensive end, and Kevin Moyer put up a running bank shot with three seconds to play that bounced off the rim. Saint Michael's controlled the rebound and hit one of two free throws. The Purple Knights then stole Le Moyne's length-of-the-court pass, securing a 61–59 victory. Saint Michael's leading scorer Todd Roberts was held scoreless by the fierce guarding of Jesse Potter and Jakub Hrabovský. He shot 0 of 6 from the floor and 0 for 3 from the free-throw line. Patton scored 13 points to lead the Dolphins. Tomsich was limited to six points on 2-for-10 shooting from the floor, eight rebounds and four assists in his final collegiate game. He finished his career with 1,760 points, third in program history, and 1,015 rebounds, also third all-time. Moyer ended his career with eight points, four assists and four steals in his final game. Potter had a double-double with 11 points and 11 rebounds. The Dolphins finished their season 13–14 overall. The season-ending losing streak was the longest for Le Moyne since dropping 13 straight during the 1980–81 season.

John Tomisch was named NE10 defensive player of the year and first-team All-NE10. Tomsich also repeated as first-team Division II All-Northeast Region and was named a second-team Division II All-American. Tomisch ranked seventh in Division II in blocked shots with 264. Kevin Moyer's 179 assists were the fifth best single-season total in program history.

== Dolphins finish last (1999–2000) ==
The Dolphins lost co-captains John Tomsich and Kevin Moyer to graduation in 1999. All nine of the other players on the previous season's roster returned, including seniors Michael Culley, Jesse Potter, Rashaan Bute and walk-on Shannon Flood, junior Jakub Hrabovský, and sophomores Tom Patton, Steve Vega and walk-on Nick Redhead. Dwayne Pean, a 6'0" guard from Goldsboro, North Carolina was the first recruit to sign a letter of intent for the 1999–2000 season. Other new freshmen included Kyle Chapman, a 6'5" guard who was from Willingboro, New Jersey and played at Wardlaw-Hartridge, Myles Howard, a 6'6" forward from Nottingham High School, Jamar Hubbard, a 6'5" shooting guard from Penn Hills in Pittsburgh and Chip James, a 6'3" guard from Springboro, Ohio. Brett Barnard, a 6'8" forward from Frankfort, New York, arrived on campus but redshirted his freshman year. Culley, Potter and Flood were named tri-captains. Dolphins assistant coach Tobin Anderson left the staff to become the head coach at Clarkson. Jonathan Tsipis joined the staff as an assistant coach.

In October 1999, the Dolphins began participating in the Dream to Read program. Players visited classrooms of local elementary schools, engaged with the students, encouraging them to read, and read a book aloud to them. The effort was organized by Le Moyne's new assistant coach, Jonathan Tsipis.

The Dolphins launched their season with a 74–69 win over host Westminster (PA) in the opening round of the Buzz Ridl Classic on November 19, 1999. Jesse Potter had a double-double with 21 points and 12 rebounds to lead Le Moyne. Potter's consecutive baskets broke a tie in the final six minutes, giving the Dolphins a lead they would not relinquish. Steve Vega scored eight points and dished four assists for Le Moyne. He sank three of four free throws in the final 15 seconds to put the game out of reach. Freshman Myles Howard had 14 points, seven rebounds and two blocks in his collegiate debut.

The following evening, the Dolphins upset California (PA), ranked no. 11 in the NCAA Division II Bulletin preseason poll, 75–65 in overtime, to win the Buzz Ridl Classic. The Vulcans expanded their 12-point halftime lead to 17, before Le Moyne stormed back. Freshman Dwayne Pean converted a three-point play with 32 seconds to play that knotted the score and forced the extra session. The Dolphins dominated play after regulation, outscoring California, 14–4, getting seven of their 14 points from freshman Kyle Chapman. Myles Howard led Le Moyne with a game-high 24 points and was named the tournament's most valuable player. Pean finished with 10 points and four assists, and Chapman had nine points.

Myles Howard was named NE10 newcomer of the week for each of the season's first three weeks.

After three straight road losses, the Dolphins returned home to host Mansfield, ranked no. 1 in the East Region of Division II, on December 20. Le Moyne trailed, 24–23, when they got a spark from Michael Culley, who was playing through a hairline fracture in his foot and a degenerative disc in his back. Culley hit a three-pointer to put the Dolphins in front, grabbed the defensive rebound on the other end of the floor and sank another triple to give Le Moyne a five-point lead. The Dolphins held the Mountaineers to 10 points over the final 10 minutes of the half and closed the stanza on a 9–2 run. Kyle Chapman powered the late burst with a three-pointer, immediately followed by a steal and a transition layup. Le Moyne was on top, 47–34, at the break. The Dolphins' lead grew as large as 20 points in the second half, and Mansfield got no closer than seven points down, falling 94–83. Le Moyne was 10 for 10 from the free-throw line in the closing minutes. Jesse Potter hit six of them, and Dwayne Pean drained the other four. Chapman and Tom Patton shared the duty of guarding Tom Harvey, who was averaging more than 20 points per game. They limited Harvey to just seven points and no field goals. Potter had a double-double with 13 points and 12 rebounds. Chapman scored a game- and career-high 26 points. Jakub Hrabovský shot 7 for 7 from the floor, finishing with 16 points, also a career high. Pean, the third Dolphin to register a new career high, had 13 points, and Patton scored seven markers. Le Moyne improved to 4–4 on the season. Chapman earned NE10 co-player of the week honors for the performance.

Le Moyne hosted a multi-team event for the first time in six years on December 29 and 30. The event was an unbracketed showcase promoted as the inaugural Holiday Inn Invitational. During warmups of the Dolphins' showcase against Southampton, ranked no. 4 in the Northeast Region of Division II, the Colonials gathered at the center-court logo, and their center, Mark Person, shouted, "This is our house!" as his teammates jumped up and down, clapping their hands. The Dolphins sat quietly on their bench and watched. The game was tight, until Michael Culley came off the bench and drained three triples in just over two minutes, putting Le Moyne ahead, 27–19. The Dolphins' full-court press led to eight first-half steals, and Le Moyne's lead swelled to 17 points. After a Southampton run cut their deficit to nine points, Kyle Chapman blocked a shot, picked up the loose ball and navigated his way through Colonial defenders for a transition layup, then converting a three-point play. The Dolphins led, 55–42, at intermission. Southampton got no closer than six points down in the second half, and a quick six-point scoring spurt by Chapman in the closing minutes put away a 101–87 win for Le Moyne. Six Dolphins scored in double figures, led by Chapman with 19 points, Tom Patton with 17, Culley with 14, Jakub Hrabovský with 12 and Alex Harris with 11 markers.

The following evening, Jakub Hrabovský scored 22 points to lead the Dolphins to a 96–91 victory over Roberts Wesleyan and a share of the invitational championship. Saint Michael's also went 2–0 in the event. Hrabovský was named the invitational's most valuable player. Alex Harris, who tore his left anterior cruciate ligament in the 1999 NE10 quarterfinals, had an ecouraging performance with a season-high 19 points and seven rebounds, while battling the Raiders' collection of strong frontcourt players. Steve Vega had 13 points, six rebounds and six assists for Le Moyne, and Kyle Chapman added 15 points. The Dolphins improved to 6–4 with their third straight win.

Michael Culley surpassed 1,000 career points in the Dolphins' 74–66 loss in their NE10 home opener against Pace on January 6, 2000. Le Moyne fell behind by 12 points but rallied late in the first half and trailed by seven at the break. The Dolphins got within two points in the second half, but the Setters responded with five points in under a minute and controlled the game the rest of the way. Although Le Moyne successfully slowed Pace's high-octane offense, which was averaging nearly 100 points per game, the Dolphins shot only 43% from the floor. Le Moyne's frustration was evident, when Kyle Chapman threw an errant inbounds pass that was caught by Dolphins head coach Dave Paulsen, who hurled it toward the gym exit. The ball was retrieved by Dolphins sports information director Mike Donlin, who returned it to the court. Myles Howard and Steve Vega each scored 14 points to lead Le Moyne, who fell to 6–5 overall and 0–4 in NE10 play.

Two days after setting a new mark for most points allowed in a home game in a 105–77 loss to Merrimack, the Dolphins surrendered even more points and suffered the worst home loss in program history, 108–66, to Saint Anselm on January 10. The Hawks built a 54–27 halftime lead on the strength of 55% shooting from the floor, 50% accuracy from three-point range and a 24–15 rebounding advantage in the first half. Nick Redhead scored 13 points off the bench to lead Le Moyne, and Jesse Potter added 12 points and six rebounds. The loss was the 13th straight in conference regular-season play and third straight overall for the Dolphins, who fell to 6–7 overall and 0–6 in NE10 play.

Jesse Potter was named to the NE10 weekly honor roll for his performances in Le Moyne's losses at Stonehill and Bryant on January 15 and 17. Potter averaged 18 points and 7.5 rebounds per game in the two contests and had a career-high 24 points against Stonehill.

The Dolphins ended losing streaks of five games overall, 15 straight in conference regular-season play and 16 in a row against NE10 foes with a 74–71 home win on January 22, against American International, the team with the best overall record in the league. Le Moyne's most recent win against an NE10 opponent had been at home against Saint Michael's on January 27, 1999, a victory that put the Dolphins into a first-place tie in the league. Le Moyne had a 10-point lead with 1:34 to play, but the Yellow Jackets created late drama, hitting a flurry of three-pointers to cut the deficit to two points with 29 seconds left. Steve Vega was fouled two seconds later and hit both free throws. After an American International empty possession, the Dolphins hit another free throw to extend the lead to five points. The Yellow Jackets scored from the lane with 12 seconds left and fouled freshman Chip James, who missed both free throws. However, James stole the ball, preventing American International from getting off a shot. Jesse Potter led Le Moyne with 19 points, nine rebounds and five assists. Vega finished with 16 points. The Dolphins improved to 7–9 overall and 1–8 in NE10 play.

The Dolphins were officially eliminated from contention for a berth in the NE10 tournament after an 82–67 loss at Merrimack on February 7. Kyle Chapman scored 21 points for Le Moyne, who fell to 8–14 overall and 1–13 in NE10 play. The loss was the 10th in 12 games and fifth straight in conference play for the Dolphins.

The Dolphins lost their season finale, 90–82, at home to Saint Michael's on February 23. Michael Culley had a team-high 17 points in his final collegiate game. He finished as Le Moyne's all-time leader in career three-point field goals with 305. Fellow senior tri-captain Jesse Potter closed his career with 16 points. Walk-on senior tri-captain Shannon Flood attempted only one shot and did not score. Le Moyne's two other seniors, Alex Harris and Rashaan Bute, had eight and four points, respectively. Despite the setback, the Dolphins shot 65% (13 for 20) from three-point range. The loss was the third straight for the Dolphins and their 13th in 16 games, leaving them 9–17 overall and 2–16 in NE10 play, last in the conference standings.

On July 4, 2000, Dolphins head coach Dave Paulsen resigned to take the head coaching position at his alma mater, Division III Williams. Athletic director Dick Rockwell said he hoped to have a new head coach in place by mid-August. Paulsen was 42–39 in his three seasons at Le Moyne. He had recently signed a three-year contract extension.

== See also ==
- History of Le Moyne Dolphins men's basketball (1992–1997)
