= 2000 Southland Conference men's basketball tournament =

- Classification: Division I
- Season: 1999–00
- Teams: 8
- Site: Hirsch Memorial Coliseum; Shreveport, Louisiana
- Champions: Lamar (3rd title)
- Winning coach: Mike Deane (1st title)

1999–2000 Southland Conference men's basketball standings
	Conf.				Overall
Team	W		L	PCT	W		L	PCT
Sam Houston State	15	–	3	.833	22	–	7	.759
Louisiana–Monroe	13	–	5	.722	19	–	9	.679
UTSA	12	–	6	.667	15	–	13	.536
Northwestern State	11	–	7	.611	17	–	13	.567
Texas–Arlington	11	–	7	.611	15	–	12	.556
Lamar †	8	–	10	.444	15	–	16	.484
Southwest Texas State	8	–	10	.444	12	–	17	.414
Nicholls State	8	–	10	.444	11	–	17	.393
Southeastern Louisiana	5	–	13	.278	10	–	17	.370
McNeese State	5	–	13	.278	6	–	21	.222
Stephen F. Austin	3	–	15	.167	6	–	21	.222
† 2000 Southland Conference tournament winner Rankings from AP Poll

The 2000 Southland Conference men's basketball tournament took place March 8–11, 2000. The quarterfinal round was played at the home arena of the higher seeded-teams, with the semifinals and championship game played at Hirsch Memorial Coliseum in Shreveport, Louisiana. Number 7 seed Lamar won the championship game over number 4 seed Northwestern State, 62–55.

The Cardinals earned the conference's automatic bid to the NCAA tournament where they lost in the opening round to No. 1 overall seed Duke.

== Format ==
The top eight eligible men's basketball teams in the Southland Conference receive a berth in the conference tournament. After the conference season, teams were seeded by conference record.

== Bracket ==
Quarterfinals; March 8
1	Sam Houston State	49
8	Nicholls State	48
4	Northwestern State	88
5	Texas–Arlington	83
3	UTSA	86
6	Southwest Texas State	88
2	Louisiana-Monroe	62
7	Lamar	66

Semifinals; March 9
1	Sam Houston State	64
4	Northwestern State	70
6	Southwest Texas State	50
7	Lamar	53

Finals; March 11
4	Northwestern State	55
7	Lamar	62

== Sources ==
- Southland Conference archives
