= History of Le Moyne Dolphins men's basketball (1992–1997) =

NCAA Division I men's basketball team representing Le Moyne College

The history of Le Moyne Dolphins men's basketball from 1992 to 1997 includes the head coaching tenure of Scott Hicks, who was the youngest head coach in the NCAA during his first two seasons. The Dolphins had winning records in their first four seasons under Hicks. Despite a losing record in 1996–97, the Dolphins won their conference tournament and made their second straight NCAA tournament appearance. Hicks inherited a team that featured capable scorers John Haas, Joe Girard and Mike Montesano. As a sophomore late in the 1991–92 season, Dan Sandel had started getting more playing time. Sandel blossomed in 1992–93, becoming a force under the basket at both ends of the floor. Montesano and sophomore Adam Stockwell were suspended for several games at the start of the 1993–94 season, for gambling, an offense that normally carries a complete loss of athletic eligibility. The NCAA approved Le Moyne's plan to suspend the two players and provide them counseling and education, and they were reinstated. Montesano set a new program record for points scored in a season during the 1994–95 campaign. Stockwell's sellar guard play, supported by fellow senior Dan Drews and freshman John Tomsich, carried Le Moyne to a 24–6 record, their best under Hicks, in 1995–96. Senior Rob Atene handled the point, and Tomsich and freshman Jesse Potter patrolled the interior, leading the Dolphins to a Cinderella march through their conference tournament and an automatic bid to the 1997 NCAA tournament. Hicks resigned in 1997, to take the head coaching position at Albany (NY), which was beginning its transition to Division I.

== Youngest head coach in the NCAA (1992–1993) ==
Le Moyne hired Scott Hicks, who played for the Dolphins from 1984 to 1988, under former coach John Beilein, as their new head coach on May 22, 1992. Hicks had been co-captain of the Dolphins team that reached the NCAA tournament in the 1987–88 season. After graduating from Le Moyne, Hicks worked as an assistant coach at Hamilton for two years before moving on to Syracuse, where he worked for Jim Boeheim for two more years. Hicks was 26 years old at the time, and Le Moyne's search committee members believed that his age was an advantage, because he could relate well to athletes trying to excel academically. Hicks was the youngest men's basketball head coach across the NCAA's three divisions during the 1992–93 season. Le Moyne received more than 70 applications from those interested in filling the coaching vacancy.

Practices for the 1992–93 season commenced on November 1. The Dolphins lost Tom Herhusky, a reliable scorer, and Bob Piddock to graduation in 1992. Four regular starters from the previous campaign returned: seniors Christian Buchholz and John Haas, junior Joe Girard and sophomore Mike Montesano. Also returning were juniors Dan Sandel, who started several games late in the 1991–92 season, and Andre Dearing and sophomores Bob McFadden, Karl Radday and Jim Brindle. A pair of freshmen recruited by former head coach John Beilein were added to the team. Dan Drews, a 6'8" center played for New York State Section 5 Class B champion Palmyra-Macedon High School. Adam Stockwell, a 6'3" guard from Belleville-Henderson High School, was the only high school player in New York state to reach 2,000 career points in 1992. The first recruit for new head coach Scott Hicks was Martin Janson, a 6'10" sophomore transfer center from Sweden. Due to the Division I age limit of 24 years old, Janson had only one year of eligibility in Division I. However, he had three years of eligibility in Division II, and Hicks was able to sign the 23-year-old. Janson had represented Sweden in international youth competition and had hopes of making the senior team. Walk-on freshmen Joe Stickle and Mike Cassella were also added to the team. Buchholz and Haas were named co-captains.

After playing the 1991–92 season as an independent, Le Moyne joined the New England Collegiate Conference (NECC) in 1992.

Chris Granozio and Don Familo, both 1986 Le Moyne graduates, replaced Peter Stoyan, who moved to Florida, calling Dolphins games on the radio in 1992. Granozio handled play-by-play, and Familo provided the color on WVOA-FM.

The Dolphins erased an early second-half nine-point deficit with a 17–2 run and cruised to a 92–76 victory over Saint Michael's at home on November 28, 1992. Mike Montesano scored 30 points to lead Le Moyne. Dan Sandel had a double-double with 12 points and 13 rebounds. Senior point guard John Haas scored 20 points, pulled down nine rebounds and dished out seven assists.

Dan Sandel sprained his medial collateral ligament early in the second half of the Dolphins' 65–63 win at Pace on December 6, and was expected to miss several weeks. A pair of free throws by Adam Stockwell with eight seconds to play secured the win for Le Moyne, which improved to 3–0 on the season. While Sandel was unavailable, Stockwell was expected to start for the Dolphins.

The Dolphins hosted the opening round of the Coca-Cola Holiday Inn Carrier Circle Classic on December 11, and defeated Hilbert, 84–51. Mike Montesano scored 15 points to lead Le Moyne. The following evening, Montesano scored 23 points to lead five Dolphins in double figures as Le Moyne captured the tournament title with a 90–75 victory over Pitt-Johnstown. Martin Janson had 14 points and 16 rebounds for the Dolphins. Montesano was named the tournament's most valuable player. Christian Buchholz had 11 points in the title game and joined Montesano on the all-tournament team. Le Moyne improved to 5–0 on the season.

The Dolphins ventured a bit more than three miles to take on Division I Syracuse, ranked no. 13 in the AP poll, in a battle of unbeatens on December 21. Syracuse paid Le Moyne about $15,000, which represented 40% of the basketball budget for the season. The Dolphins started the game strong and led, 11–10, with 14:37 left in the first half, before the Orangemen went on an 18–3 run. Le Moyne recovered to pull within 10 points with five minutes to play in the half, but Syracuse responded with a 17–2 run and led, 51–27, at intermission. The Dolphins' shooting heated up, and they outscored the Orangemen, 25–23, over the first 11 1/2 minutes of the second half, but Syracuse controlled the final eight minutes and cruised to a 102–71 win. Point guard John Haas finished with 14 points, seven assists and three steals for Le Moyne. Center Martin Janson led the Dolphins with 17 points and eight rebounds. Lawrence Moten led the Orangemen with 16 points and 12 rebounds, including nine off the offensive boards. John Wallace added 13 points and seven rebounds, and Mike Hopkins finished with 12 points and eight rebounds for Syracuse.

John Haas and Martin Janson each scored 15 points in the Dolphins' 83–56 loss at Division I Siena on December 28. After the Saints controlled the game most of the way, Janson's offensive reboound and three-point play pulled the Dolphins within a point with 12:44 to play, but Siena went on a 27–5 run over the next nine minutes to put the game away. Janson grabbed 12 rebounds, and Haas added four assists for Le Moyne, which dropped to 5–2 on the season. For his efforts against Syracuse and Siena, Janson was named NECC rookie of the week.

The Dolphins played their first NECC game at Keene State on January 5, 1993. Mike Montesano scored 30 points and shot 6 for 9 from three-point range to lead Le Moyne to an 84–71 win. Dan Sandel returned to the lineup and scored eight points.

The following evening, the Dolphins visited Franklin Pierce, ranked no. 2 in the NCAA Division II poll. Le Moyne closed the first half on a 22–10 run and had a 37–31 lead at the break. A 10-foot jump shot by Martin Janson, who finished with eight points, gave the Dolphins a 43–35 lead with 15:44 to play. However, the Ravens responded with a 12–0 run that gave them the lead for good, and Franklin Pierce cruised to a 76–69 victory. Dan Sandel scored 16 points to lead Le Moyne. Janson and Sandel grabbed six rebounds each. John Haas scored 13 points and had nine assists for the Dolphins.

Martin Janson repeated as NECC rookie of the week and was also named Eastern College Athletic Conference (ECAC) Division II rookie of the week on January 18.

The Dolphins had a brief two-game homestand over three days and welcomed a pair of ranked teams. Franklin Pierce, ranked no. 4 in the NCAA Division II poll, claimed a 9–2 lead over Le Moyne in the first three minutes of the game on January 30. The Dolphins battled back, and Adam Stockwell's jump shot over 6'8" Jason Miglionico cut the Ravens' lead to 52–50 with 11:32 to play. However, Franklin Pierce hit a three-pointer on their next possession. After a shoving match between Le Moyne's John Haas and the Ravens' Larry Wynn expanded to involve several Franklin Pierce players, Miglionico was ejected for leaving the bench and joining the fracas. Mike Montesano hit a pair of technical free throws, and the Ravens' lead was 58–54 with 9:51 left. However, Franklin Pierce scored the game's next five points and pulled away from there for a 79–66 victory. The Ravens' defense forced 20 turnovers, and Le Moyne managed only nine assists. Haas scored 18 points to lead the Dolphins. Dan Sandel and Martin Janson each had a double-double for Le Moyne. Sandel had 12 points, 12 rebounds and two blocks, and Janson scored 10 points, grabbed 10 boards and blocked two shots.

New Hampshire College, ranked no. 11 in the NCAA Division II poll, built a 13-point lead on February 1, but the Dolphins fought back and tied the score at 60 with seven minutes to play on a three-pointer by freshman Adam Stockwell. After a John Haas bank shot gave the Dolphins their first lead at 65–63 with 3:50 on the clock, the Penmen scored the next five points to take a 68–65 lead with two minutes remaining. The Dolphins had possession in the closing seconds, trailing, 68–67. However, a short jump shot by Christian Buchholz was off the mark and rebounded by New Hampshire College, which held on for the win. Stockwell scored 22 points off the bench to lead Le Moyne. Dan Sandel scored 20 points, snatched six rebounds and neutralized Wayne Robertson, the New Hampshire College center, who came into the game averaging 20.5 points and 14.7 rebounds per contest. Robertson finished with only six points and five rebounds. The loss was the Dolphins' fourth straight, dropping them to 9–8 overall and 3–6 in NECC play.

John Haas became the 22nd Dolphin to reach 1,000 career points in Le Moyne's 100–75 win at Division III Mount Saint Mary (NY) on February 9. Christian Buchholz scored 16 points to lead Le Moyne, which improved to 11–9 on the season.

John Haas recorded his 500th career assist in the Dolphins' 109–93 home victory over New Haven on February 13. Le Moyne shot 61% from the floor in the first half and led, 51–27, at the break. The Dolphins set new program records in the game for free throws made and attempted, going 42 for 50 from the line. The Chargers had embarked on their road trip to Le Moyne for the Saturday evening game at 3 p.m. on Friday afternoon. However, a series of mechanical failures involving three different buses resulted in the Chargers arriving at 2 a.m. Saturday morning. To make matters worse, New Haven took a bus from their hotel to the Henninger Athletic Center for a morning shoot-around, but the bus driver misunderstood the instructions and left after dropping them off. The players were stuck waiting at the gym for five hours. Nevertheless, Chargers head coach Stu Grove made no excuses, crediting the Dolphins for their stellar play. Mike Montesano scored 25 points to lead Le Moyne. Haas finished with 18 points and seven assists. Dan Sandel had a double-double for the Dolphins with 13 points and 11 rebounds. Le Moyne improved to 12–9 overall and 4–7 in NECC play with their second straight win.

Trailing by 12 points with 7:30 to play in the first half of a February 17 home game against Gannon, ranked no. 20 in the NCAA Division II poll, Dolphins head coach Scott Hicks switched from a man-to-man defense to a trapping one and inserted Joe Girard into the game. Le Moyne went on a 14–2 run and tied the game just over three minutes later. Girard was 3 for 4 from three-point range during the run. The Golden Knights regained their composure, and the game was close the rest of the way. With the score tied at 53, Mike Montensano's triple put the Dolphins in front for good with 4:39 to play. Gannon got within a point in the final minute, but Le Moyne's solid free-throw shooting allowed them to hold on for a 68–63 victory. Montesano scored 16 points to lead the Dolphins and was 4 for 4 from the charity stripe in the final 23 seconds. Le Moyne's fourth straight win improved their record to 14–9.

Trailing by five points with 1:20 to play, the Dolphins got a baseline jumper from Mike Montesano, which he followed up with a three-pointer with 48 seconds left to tie the score at 70 in their February 20 game at New Hampshire College, ranked no. 6 in the NCAA Division II poll. Montesano hit another triple in overtime that put Le Moyne ahead for good, 75–73, and the Dolphins defeated the Penmen, 78–75. Montesano finished with a career-high 31 points. This was Le Moyne's second straight win over a ranked Division II opponent and fifth straight victory overall, and it was the only regular-season loss New Hampshire College suffered in NECC play this season. The Dolphins improved to 15–9 overall and 5–7 in NECC play, keeping Le Moyne's hopes of hosting a NECC tournament quarterfinal game alive.

After another win at Massachusetts Lowell on February 21, the Dolphins put themselves in position to earn a home game in the NECC tournament quarterfinals with a win in their regular-season finale, a home tilt against Southern Connecticut State. Trailing the Owls by three points at halftime, Le Moyne opened the second half with a 17–0 run and then extended the run to 34–10 to take a 21-point lead with less than 10 minutes to play on their way to an 80–70 victory over Southern Connecticut. The Dolphins, picked seventh in the pre-season NECC coaches poll, secured the third seed in the NECC tournament and home-court advantage for the tournament quarterfinals with the win, their seventh straight. Joe Girard and Christian Buchholz each scored 19 points to lead Le Moyne, and Buchholz passed 1,000 points for his career. Dan Sandel had a double-double with 12 points and 17 rebounds for the Dolphins, who improved to 17–9 overall and 7–7 in NECC play.

The Dolphins hosted no. 6 seed Sacred Heart in a NECC quarterfinal game on March 2. The Dolphins were nursing a two-point lead, when Mike Montesano's three-pointer sparked a 37–21 run over the final 15 minutes of the game that gave Le Moyne a 101–83 victory. Montesano scored 22 points on 8-for-11 shooting to lead the Dolphins and added fives assists and three steals. John Haas and Dan Sandel each had a double-double for Le Moyne. Haas had 15 points and 11 assists, and Sandel finished with 17 points and 11 rebounds. Haas was the primary defender on Pioneers senior guard Darrin Robinson, who was held to a game-high 24 points on 10-for-32 shooting. Robinson entered the game averaging 32.3 points per contest and shooting 50% from the floor for the season. Martin Janson added 18 points, and Christian Buchholz finished with 14 points for the Dolphins.

Top-seeded New Hampshire College hosted the NECC semifinals, and the Dolphins were matched with no. 2 seed Franklin Pierce, ranked no. 16 in the NCAA Division II poll, The Dolphins' late 9–0 run flipped a three-point deficit to a 69–63 lead. After the teams exchanged four points each, Le Moyne was ahead, 73–67, with 1:22 to play. However, the Ravens took control from there, ending the game on an 8–0 run for a 75–73 victory. Andre Dearing fired a desperation three-pointer at the buzzer, but it missed to the left. The loss ended the Dolphins' eight-game winning streak as well as their season. John Haas had a double-double with 15 points and 10 assists to lead Le Moyne, which finished the season 18–10.

Mike Montesano was named second-team All-NECC. Dan Sandel finished 11th in rebounding in Division II for the season with an average of 10.5 per game. The Dolphins were second in free-throw shooting in Division II, connecting on 75.6% of their charity tosses.

== Gambling suspensions and Sandel shines (1993–1994) ==
The Dolphins lost John Haas and Christian Buchholz to graduation in 1993. Seniors Joe Girard, Dan Sandel and Andre Dearing, juniors Mike Montesano, Bob McFadden and Karl Radday and sophomores Adam Stockwell, Dan Drews and Joe Stickle all returned for the 1993–94 season. Martin Janson, who averaged 11 points and seven rebounds the previous season, played for Sweden's national team in EuroBasket and then represented his country at the World University Games over the summer. He left Le Moyne and had plans to play professionally in Europe in the fall. Freshman John Henches, a 6'8" center from Shenendehowa High School was new to the team. Also added were freshmen Bob Kawa Jr., a 5'10" guard, Rob Atene, a 6'1" guard, and 6'2" forward Bryan Menar. Kawa was a walk-on who played at Christian Brothers Academy and the son of Bob Kawa, who played for the Dolphins from 1970 to 1973, and served as an assistant coach from 1976 to 1980, and for the 1982–83 season. Girard and Sandel were named co-captains. Le Moyne hired Chris Downs and Daryl Crist as assistant coaches. Crist completed his playing career at Seton Hall the previous season. Downs was only a year removed from playing at Oneonta. Head coach Scott Hicks, who also held the distinction the previous season, remained the youngest men's basketball mentor across all three NCAA divisions.

A cloud of uncertaintly hung over the Dolphins as the season was about to begin. Le Moyne announced that six unnamed male athletes would be suspended from competition for gambling on major college sporting events. The identity of the student-athletes involved remained confidential; before the start of the season, even head coach Scott Hicks was not told whether any of his players were involved. Le Moyne conducted its own investigation and determined the length of each suspension based on the extent of the student-athlete's involvement in gambling activities. Dr. Michael W. Yost, Le Moyne's vice president for student life, said that, while the conduct was disappointing, the cooperation of the students was outstanding. In addition to the suspensions, the student-athletes would participate in educational activities and receive counseling. Since NCAA rules require that student-athletes who gamble on major college sports automatically lose their athletic eligibility, Le Moyne had to apply for reinstatement of the six athletes. The NCAA approved Le Moyne's remediation plan and granted reinstatement to all six.

The Dolphins opened their season at Saint Rose on November 19, and made the trip without Mike Montesano and Adam Stockwell. Head coach Scott Hicks would say nothing more than that they were suspended for violating team policy, but it appeared likely that Montesano and Stockwell were two of the six student-athletes suspended for gambling. Joe Girard scored 21 points to lead Le Moyne in a 65–63 defeat.

After starting the season with three road losses, the Dolphins hosted Roberts Wesleyan on November 29, and fell behind 13–2 and 18–6. Dan Sandel then dominated the paint on the offensive end, scoring 20 first-half points, as Le Moyne finished the half on a 33–12 run to take a nine-point lead at the break. Andre Dearing carried the load in the second half, scoring 17 points after intermission, as the Dolphins won, 88–71. Sandel finished with 30 points and 11 rebounds. Dearing also scored 30 points and had five steals. Freshman Rob Atene scored three points and had seven assists for Le Moyne. Mike Montesano and Adam Stockwell remained suspended for violating team rules.

The Dolphins hosted Mount Saint Mary (NY) in the opening round of their Coca-Cola Holiday Inn Carrier Circle Classic on December 10. After claiming a 14-point lead at imtermission, a 16–7 Le Moyne run to open the second half put the game away, and the Dolphins won, 97–56. Dan Sandel scored 19 points and grabbed 12 rebounds to lead Le Moyne, which had six players score in double figures. Andre Dearing scored 16 points and had team-highs of seven assists and five steals for the Dolphins. Mike Montesano remained suspended for violating team rules. Adam Stockwell's suspension ended after the season's first four games, but he and Bryan Menar each missed their second straight contest. Both were suffering from mononucleosis.

The following evening, Dan Sandel scored 27 points and grabbed 18 rebounds, leading the Dolphins to a 90–81 victory over Mercyhurst in the tournament final. Rob Atene scored eight points and had seven assists for Le Moyne. Sandel was the tournament's most valuable player and was joined on the all-tournament team by teammates Andre Dearing and Joe Girard. The Dolphins continued playing without Mike Montesano, Adam Stockwell and Bryan Menar. Sandel was named NECC player of the week and made the ECAC honor roll on December 13.

After serving a four-game suspension and missing three more contests with mononucleosis, Adam Stockwell returned to the lineup in the Dolphins' wire-to-wire 79–63 win at Keene State on January 4, 1994. Dan Sandel scored 22 points and snatched 12 rebounds to lead Le Moyne. Stockwell finished with 11 points. The Dolphins improved to 4–4 overall and 1–0 in NECC play.

Mike Montesano made his season debut after serving an eight-game suspension in the Dolphins' 68–65 loss at Franklin Pierce on January 5. Dan Sandel scored a game-high 19 points for Le Moyne. Montesano finished with six points.

Dan Sandel was named NECC co-player of the week on January 10, after averaging 19.3 points and 12.7 rebounds per game and shooting 64% from the field in three games.

The Dolphins recorded an impressive home win over New Hampshire College, ranked no. 8 in the NCAA Division II poll, on January 12. After falling behind, 9–2, Le Moyne went on an 18–4 run over six minutes to take a seven-point lead. After the Penmen cut the lead to 27–26, Bob McFadden and Mike Montesano answered with a pair of jump shots. New Hampshire College scored the first six points of the second half to cut the Dolphins' lead to 45–44. Le Moyne responded with a 10–2 run, highlighted by Andre Dearing's steal and length-of-the-floor drive for a basket. The Dolphins controlled the rest of the game, winning, 94–85. Dan Sandel had a double-double for the 10th straight game with 24 points and 10 rebounds. Andre Dearing had six points and eight assist for Le Moyne. The win was the Dolphins' third straight and sixth in their last seven games, improving their record to 7–5 overall and 4–1 in NECC play.

Bryan Menar, who had missed 11 games and was still ill with mononucleosis, applied for a medical redshirt in January 1994.

Dan Sandel was named ECAC and NECC player of the week on January 17. He averaged 22.3 points and 13.3 rebounds per game and shot 71% from the floor.

The Dolphins entered their January 22 game at Southern Connecticut on a five-game winning streak, winners of eight of their previous nine games and in first place in the NECC. Dan Sandel's dunk gave Le Moyne a 66–51 lead with 8:33 to play. However, the Owls closed the game on a 22–6 run and won the game, 73–72, on a six-foot jump shot by Cedric Pitt from the lane at the buzzer. The Dolphins shot an abysmal 5 for 19 from the free-throw line, including 2 for 7 over the final five minutes. Mike Montesano scored 20 points to lead Le Moyne. Sandel had a double-double with 20 points and 11 rebounds, after his double-double streak had been stopped at 10 straight games in the Dolphins' previous contest. Andre Dearing had 11 points and five assists. Le Moyne fell to 9–6 overall and 6–2 in NECC play.

Senior Joe Girard became the 24th player in Le Moyne program history to score 1,000 career points in the Dolphins' 92–71 home win over St. Lawrence on February 2. Girard finished with 12 points on 3-for-12 shooting from the floor; all his field-goal attempts were three-point shots. Dan Drews set a Division II record with his 18th consecutive three-pointer without a miss. Drews finally missed with about five minutes to play. Drews finished with 18 points to lead Le Moyne. Dan Sandel scored 11 points and grabbed nine rebounds for the Dolphins, and Rob Atene had two points and seven assists. Le Moyne improved to 12–6 with the win, their third straight and 11th in their last 13 games.

Senior Dan Sandel passed the 1,000 career points mark in the Dolphins' 86–80 victory at Sacred Heart on February 6. Trailing by five points early in the second half, the Dolphins went on an 18–5 run to take a 51–43 lead with 11:55 to play. Le Moyne shot 9 for 9 from the free throw line over the last 1:16 of the game to repel the Pioneers' comeback attempt. Andre Dearing led the Dolphins with 21 point and four assists. Sandel had a double-double with 13 points and a game-high 12 rebounds. Le Moyne improved to 13–7 overall and 9–3 in the NECC.

Dan Sandel scored 30 points on 14-for-18 shooting from the floor and grabbed 11 rebounds to lead the Dolphins to an 86–73 home win over Hilbert on February 10. Rob Atene scored two points and dished out six assists for Le Moyne.

Junior Mike Montesano scored 24 points and became the third Dolphin this season to surpass 1,000 career points in Le Moyne's 100–67 home win over New Haven. Dan Sandel had a double-double with 15 points and 10 rebounds for Le Moyne. Andre Dearing scored seven points and handed out four assists. The Dolphins' third straight win and 14th in their last 17 games improved their record to 15–7 overall and 10–3 in NECC play. That was good for third place in the conference, just percentage points behind Franklin Pierce and New Hampshire College, which were tied for first place at 9–2.

Mike Montesano scored 35 points and was 20 for 23 from the free-throw line, leading the Dolphins to a 106–78 win at Massachusetts Lowell on February 20, 1994. Le Moyne trailed by nine points with 5:02 remaining in the first half and went on a 17–0 run to claim a 51–43 lead at the break. Montesano scored 10 of the 17 points and was 7 for 7 from the charity stripe during the run. The Dolphins opened the second half with a 12–4 run and led by 16 points with 15:51 to play. Dan Sandel had a double-double with 15 points and 12 rebounds for Le Moyne. Karl Radday added nine points and eight assists. The Dolphins improved to 16–9 overall and 11–4 in NECC play.

After their first home loss of the campaign in their regular-season finale against Southern Connecticut on February 26, the Dolphins finished third in the NECC with a league record of 11–5. Le Moyne hosted Massachusetts Lowell, a team they had beaten easily twice during the regular season, in a NECC quarterfinal game on March 1. The Dolphins were confused by the changing zone defenses used by the Chiefs and held to 36% shooting from the field and 33% from three-point range, well short of their 40% accuracy from beyond the arc entering the game. Le Moyne committed 21 turnovers, even though Lowell did not press often. Head coach Scott Hicks said that many of the turnovers were unforced, and the players failed to recognize the zones being used, resulting in poor shot selection as the shot clock was winding down. The Chiefs claimed an early 23–11 lead, before the Dolphins got back into the game with an 11–0 run, fueled by a pair of Joe Girard three-pointers. Le Moyne fell behind by nine points midway through the second half but took a two-point lead after a 26–15 run, capped by an Andre Dearing triple. Mike Montesano's free throws broke a tie and gave the Dolphins a 73–71 lead with 24 seconds to play. However, Spencer Staggs hit two charity tosses with seven seconds on the clock to send the game to overtime. Two Lowell starters had fouled out in regulation, which appeared to favor Le Moyne, and Dearing's three-point play gave the Dolphins a 77–75 lead with 3:12 to play. That was the Dolphins' final basket of the game. Dan Sandel, who had game-highs of 26 points and 18 rebounds, fouled out diving for a loose ball with Le Moyne trailing 78–77. The Chiefs closed the game on a 12–2 run and secured an 87–79 victory, bringing the Dolphins' season to an abrupt end, having lost two straight at home and four of their last five games.

Dan Sandel finished his collegiate career with 896 rebounds, fourth in Le Moyne program history, and 1,138 points. Joe Girard ended his career as the Dolphins' all-time leader in three-point field goals with 289.

Dan Sandel was named 1994 first-team All-NECC and Mike Montesano was named to the second team. Joe Girard was named 1994 first-team District I Academic All-America in February and National Academic All-America in March 1994.

== Montesano scores (1994–1995) ==
The Dolphins lost three starters to graduation in 1994: point guard Andre Dearing and co-captains Joe Girard, the program's all time leader in career three-point field goals, and Dan Sandel, the 1993–94 team's leading scorer and rebounder. Returning for the 1994–95 season were seniors Mike Montesano, Bob McFadden and Karl Radday, juniors Adam Stockwell and Dan Drews, sophomores Rob Atene, John Henches and Bob Kawa Jr. and redshirt freshman Bryan Menar. Dave Ingram, a 6'3" sophomore swingman, who transferred from Tennessee Tech, was new to the team. Head coach Scott Hicks thought 6'1" freshman guard Keith Moyer was underrecruited. Moyer averaged 19.6 points and seven assists per game as a senior at Paul V. Moore High School, which reached the New York state Class B final. Other additions were freshman Dan Faulkner, a 6'4" forward, and walk-on sophomore Kurt Stroman, a 6'5" forward. Montesano, McFadden and Radday were named tri-captains.

Over the summer, Mike Montesano and Bob McFadden played in the 1994 Empire State Games. Montesano represented the Western Region, and McFadden played for the Central Region.

After starting the season 2–1, the Dolphins welcomed highly touted Saint Rose to the Henninger Athletic Center on December 3, 1994. Le Moyne's 2-3 zone defense befuddled the Golden Knights in the first half, and the Dolphins built a 40–31 lead at the break. However, Saint Rose solved Le Moyne and went 5 for 9 from behind the arc in the second half and ended up 7 for 15 for the game. The Golden Knights had only attempted 10 triples in their first three games of the season. Their hot shooting gave Saint Rose an 81–69 lead, but the Dolphins battled back. With 13 seconds to play, Le Moyne had cut the deficit to 89–86, when freshman Dan Faulkner forced Ralph Bucci to travel, giving the Dolphins possession. Mike Montesano's three-pointer with eight seconds to play was off the mark, but Faulkner saved the rebound from going out of bounds. After the ball glanced off Dan Drews, it bounced to Montesano, who stepped back and hit a triple at the buzzer to send the game to overtime. In the closing seconds of overtime, the Dolphins had the ball, down by a point. Adam Stockwell drove the lane. The defender, Jermaine Henderson, swatted down with his left hand, and Stockwell's forced shot missed at the buzzer, giving Saint Rose a 96–95 victory. After the game, Henderson said, "I got all ball," and Stockwell said he did not know whether he was fouled. Head coach Scott Hicks would not comment on whether a foul should have been called, but Montesano vehemently insisted Stockwell was fouled. The loss spoiled a magnificent game for Montesano, who set a new career high with 37 points. Stockwell finished with 17 points and nine rebounds. Dave Ingram had two points and six assists for Le Moyne.

In their final game before conference play began, the Dolphins fell, 94–54, at Syracuse, ranked no. 11 in the Division I AP poll. Mike Montesano had a game-high 22 points for Le Moyne. Adam Stockwell added 15 points, five rebounds, two assists and two steals. Sophomore center John Henches battled the bigger Orangemen and finished with six points, five rebounds and an assist. Rob Atene did not score for the Dolphins but had four assists and a steal. The loss dropped Le Moyne to 4–3 on the season.

Riding a three-game winning streak, the Dolphins hosted New Hampshire College, ranked no. 16 in the Division II poll, but losers of three of the previous four games, on January 11, 1995. Le Moyne shot poorly in the first half, hitting only 11 of 31 from the floor, and fell behind by 12 points before cutting the deficit to three points at halftime. The Penmen surged to another 12-point lead with 7:35 to play, before a 19–6 Dolphins run gave Le Moyne a 79–78 lead with 1:24 remaining. New Hampshire College got a dunk on their next possession to move back in front with 39 seconds left. Rob Atene dribbed and ran down the clock before passing to an open Bob McFadden, whose shot from the lane missed. Baris Kacar grabbed the rebound for the Penmen but traveled, when he fell to the floor with five seconds on the clock. New Hampshire College stole the ensuing inbounds pass and hit a pair of free throws with two seconds to play. Another Penmen steal of a Le Moyne inbounds pass sealed an 82–79 win for New Hampshire College. The Dolphins dropped to 7–5 overall and 3–2 in NECC play, after losing a game the players felt they should have won. Le Moyne had 14 steals in the game and forced 26 Penmen turnovers, while committing only 10. The Dolphins outrebounded New Hampshire College, 36–31. Adam Stockwell had a game-high 21 points for Le Moyne and added four rebounds, three assists and four steals.

Adam Stockwell was named to the ECAC honor roll on January 17. In addition to his performance against New Hampshire College, Stockwell had 18 points and nine rebounds in a win over Keene State and 20 points and nine rebounds in Le Moyne's victory over Sacred Heart.

The Dolphins overcame a slow start and a 10-point second-half deficit to earn their fifth straight win, a 70–68 triumph over Franklin Pierce on January 28. After Le Moyne surged ahead, shaky free-throw shooting in the late stages of the game allowed the Ravens to tie the score at 68. With 17 seconds to play, Kevin Ervin of Franklin Pierce saved a loose ball from going out of bounds under the Ravens' basket. Dan Drews grabbed the ball and scored to give the Dolphins the lead. Mike Montesano scored 23 points to lead Le Moyne and added two assists and to steals. Drews had 12 points and six rebounds, and Adam Stockwell finished with 10 points, six rebounds and two assists. Bob McFadden had nine points and six rebounds, and freshman Keith Moyer scored three points and had a team-high three assists for the Dolphins, who improved to 12–5 overall and 8–2 in NECC play.

The struggling Dolphins, losers of three of their previous four games, survived a New Haven second-half surge and escaped with a 71–67 home win on February 11. Le Moyne had a 17-point lead early in the second half that the Chargers erased with a 30–12 run. With the score tied at 62, a Dan Drews three-pointer and a pair fo free throws by Bob McFadden gave the Dolphins a five-point lead with 1:14 to play. After New Haven scored, Rob Atene's pass to Adam Stockwell for a basket with 32 seconds left restored Le Moyne's five-points advantage. A triple by the Chargers cut the lead to two points, and New Haven fouled Mike Montesano, who hit both free throws with 27 seconds on the clock. The Chargers missed three shots and collected a pair of offensive rebounds but did not score again as the Dolphins held on for the win. Montesano led Le Moyne with 23 points and six assists. Stockwell added nine points and nine rebounds for the Dolphins, who improved to 14–8 overall and 9–5 in NECC play and clinched home-court advantage for the NECC quarterfinals.

Although Adam Stockwell played well enough to be named to the NECC honor roll, averaging 20.7 points and 5.7 rebounds per game, during the final full week of the regular season, the Dolphins faltered, dropping their final two league games to finish with a 9–7 conference record, tied for third place with Massachusetts Lowell. Since the teams had identical records versus each conference opponent, a coin flip was needed to determine the no. 3 seed. Massachusetts Lowell won the coin flip, and Le Moyne was the no. 4 seed in the conference tournament.

Mike Montesano scored 35 points to lead the Dolphins to a 102–76 home win over no. 5 seed Southern Connecticut in the NECC quarterfinals on February 26. His performance made Montesano the first Dolphins player to score 600 points in a single season in program history. Le Moyne took control of the game early, shooting 65% from the floor and making 9 of 14 three-pointers in the first half to claim a 17-point lead at the break. Adam Stockwell scored 12 points and grabbed six rebounds for the Dolphins, and Rob Atene added three points and five assists.

No. 1 seed New Hampshire College led wire to wire and delighted their home crowd, defeating the Dolphins 98–86 in the NECC semifinals on March 1. The Penmen shot 13 for 27 from beyond the arc, while Le Moyne was 9 for 34. The Dolphins got within eight points of the lead on a Dan Drews three-pointer with 53 seconds to play, but New Hampshire College was 6 for 8 from the free-throw line for the rest of the game. Senior Mike Montesano scored 20 points to lead Le Moyne. He fouled out in the closing seconds for the first time this season and left the floor to a standing ovation from the Penmen fans. Montesano finished the season with 646 points, a Le Moyne program record. His 1,759 career points made him the Dolphins' third all-time leading scorer. Drews finished with 14 points and nine rebounds. Dave Ingram did not score but had five assists for Le Moyne. Adam Stockwell added 19 points on 9-for-18 shooting from the floor, and Karl Radday had 11 points on 5-for-6 shooting in his final collegiate game. The Dolphins finished their season 16–12. Montesano was named to the All-Tournament team.

Mike Montesano was named 1995 first-team All-NECC. He was also named second-team Division II All-District for the Northeast Region. Montesano was selected as a second-team Division II All-American by the National Association of Basketball Coaches. He was the first player in Le Moyne program history to make the second team.

== Tomsich arrives, Stockwell thrives and Dolphins dance (1995–1996) ==
The Dolphins lost Mike Montesano, who had set a new program record for points in a season in his final campaign, Bob McFadden and Karl Radday to graduation in 1995. Returning for the 1995–96 campaign were seniors Adam Stockwell and Dan Drews, juniors Rob Atene, Dave Ingram, Bob Kawa Jr. and Kurt Stroman, redshirt sophomore Bryan Menar and sophomores Dan Faulkner and Keith Moyer. Junior John Henches was injured during the offseason and was unavailable until the following fall. The injury to Henches, who started at center the previous season, meant Le Moyne would rely heavily on 6'10" freshman center John Tomsich from Saint Peter's in Mansfield, Ohio. Kevin Moyer, a 5'11" walk-on freshman guard from Paul V. Moore High School, joined his brother, Keith, on the team. Freshman Dave Langrell, a 6'5" forward from New Zealand, was added to the team between semesters. Stockwell, Drews and Menar were named tri-captains.

Le Moyne announced, in June 1995, that the school's athletic programs would move to the Northeast-10 Conference (NE10) starting with the 1996–97 academic year, which meant this would be the final season for the Dolphins in the NECC.

Adam Stockwell was named NECC player of the week on December 4, after scoring 23 points against Southern Connecticut and 24 against New Haven, as the Dolphins won their first two games in conference play. The wins improved Le Moyne to 5–1 overall.

Adam Stockwell became the 27th Dolphin to reach 1,000 career points in Le Moyne's 74–62 win at Stony Brook on January 3, 1996. Stockwell had 18 points, eight rebounds, seven assists and six steals in the game. The win improved the Dolphins to 7–2 overall and 4–1 in NECC play.

Adam Stockwell scored 33 points on 14-for-20 shooting from the floor in the Dolphins' 87–71 home victory over Bridgeport on January 7. John Tomsich had a double-double with 14 points, 11 rebounds and two blocked shots for Le Moyne, and Rob Atene added five points, eight assists and four steals. The Dolphins improved to 9–2 overall and 6–1 in the NECC with their fourth straight win.

The Dolphins hosted New Hampshire College, ranked no. 18 in the NCAA Division II poll, on January 21. After Le Moyne claimed an early 29–22 lead, the Penmen closed the first half with a 16–2 run and led by seven points at halftime. The Dolphins' defense dominated the second half, holding the Penmen to 32% shooting from the floor, including a 1-for-8 clip from beyond the arc, and winning the battle on the boards, 22–12. However, when starting point guard Rob Atene fouled out with 3:42 to play, Le Moyne led by only 67–64. Keith Moyer, who had not yet scored in the game, answered the call to fill in for Atene and ran the offense while scoring six points in the closing minutes to secure a 77–69 victory. Freshman center John Tomsich proved to be a difficult matchup for the undersized Penmen. He finished with eight points, 11 rebounds, two assists, four blocked shots and a steal. Adam Stockwell scored 21 points and dished out six assists to lead the Dolphins. Dan Drews added 18 points and seven rebounds for Le Moyne, which improved to 12–3 overall and 9–2 in NECC play.

Adam Stockwell scored 33 points to lead the Dolphins to an 84–70 victory at Hobart on January 31, 1996. Stockwell shot 12 for 23 from the floor, including 5 for 12 from three-point range, and added 11 rebounds for a double-double. The Dolphins got off to a slow start but closed the first half with a 10–0 run to take a seven-point lead at the break. Freshman John Tomsich set a new single-season program record with his 63rd blocked shot of the campaign. He finished the game with three points and five blocks. Dan Drews had a double-double for Le Moyne with 10 points and a game-high 13 rebounds, and Dave Ingram scored 18 points off the bench. The Dolphins' sixth straight win improved their record to 16–3.

The Dolphins hosted Franklin Pierce in a battle for first place in the NECC on February 3. After falling behind, 21–10, Le Moyne used a 2-2-1 zone press to create turnovers and fuel a 21–0 run and seize a 10-point lead. By halftime, the Ravens had cut the lead to four points. The second half remained tight, and Franklin Pierce took a 70–67 lead on a three-pointer with 1:05 to play. The Dolphins missed a three-point attempt and committed three turnovers in the final minute. Dan Drews hit a late triple for Le Moyne, cutting the lead to 73–70, but the Ravens hit a pair of free throws with 13 seconds left to ice a 77–72 victory. Franklin Pierce was 8 for 15 on three-pointers, while Le Moyne was only 3 for 13. Adam Stockwell scored 16 points to lead the Dolphins, and Drews added 15 points and nine rebounds. Rob Atene had nine points and six assists for Le Moyne, who fell to 16–4 overall and 12–3 in NECC play.

The Dolphins defeated Stony Brook, 62–50, in their final home game of the regular season and in their NECC finale on February 17. Adam Stockwell scored a game-high 19 points, grabbed nine rebounds and dished out five assists for Le Moyne. Dan Drews had a double-double with 15 points and a game-high 10 rebounds. The Dolphins improved to 20–5 overall and 16–4 in the NECC, good for second place. The Dolphins did not know whether they would be playing at home again this season. New Hampshire College had two NECC games remaining, and, if they won both, they would tie Le Moyne for second place and win the tiebreaker for the no. 2 seed in the NECC tournament. The top two seeds received a bye to the semifinals, played on the home court of the no. 1 seed, Franklin Pierce. The no. 3 seed played a conference quarterfinal game at home.

New Hampshire College earned an 82–66 home win over Massachusetts Lowell on February 21, to clinch the no. 2 seed in the NECC tournament, dropping the Dolphins to the no. 3 seed.

The Dolphins escaped their NECC quarterfinal game against Albany (NY) with a 76–73 overtime victory over the Great Danes, whom they had beaten twice during the regular season. The game was tight throughout, and neither team led by more than five points during the second half or overtime. After Le Moyne took a 74–73 lead in overtime, the Great Danes and Dolphins each failed to score on three straight possessions. On Albany's next possession, Le Moyne head coach Scott Hicks gambled and had his team press while protecting a one-point lead, and Dan Drews fouled Tom McGoldrick with 12 seconds left. McGoldrick missed the front end of a one-and-one. John Tomsich snatched the rebound and was fouled with nine seconds to play. With a chance to put the game away for the Dolphins, Tomsich missed both free throws. However, Drews back-tapped the rebound, and Rob Atene retrieved the ball. Atene passed to Adam Stockwell, who had not scored since the 6:13 mark of the second half. Stockwell was fouled with four seconds left and hit both free throws to seal the win. Stockwell logged 43 minutes and finished with 26 points, seven rebounds, two assists and four steals. Drews had 24 points, six rebounds, one assist and two steals. Atene added four points and seven assists, and Tomsich had six points and two blocked shots. The Dolphins improved to 22–5 on the season.

Leading by three points with 15 minutes to play, the Dolphins went on a 13–3 run to break the game open and defeated New Hampshire College, 81–68, in the NECC semifinals on March 1. Adam Stockwell scored 25 points to lead Le Moyne, and Dan Drews added 16 points and six rebounds.

The Dolphins surged ahead of Southern Connecticut in the final 10 minutes of the NECC final on March 2, and hit eight straight free throws in the final five minutes to defeat the Owls, 77–73, and win the conference title, earning an automatic bid to the NCAA tournament. Dave Ingram scored 19 points and was named the tournament's most valuable player. Dan Drews had 22 points and eight rebounds for Le Moyne, and Rob Atene added 11 points and seven assists. The Dolphins improved to 24–5 on the season, matching the highest win total in program history, previously achieved in 1987–88.

The Dolphins were seeded no. 5 in the Northeast Region and matched with no. 4 seed Franklin Pierce, ranked no. 17 in the Division II poll, in a first-round game played on Siena's home court in Loudonville, New York. Le Moyne shot only 34% from the floor, while allowing the Ravens to shoot 55% and suffered an 83–53 loss in the first round of the NCAA tournament on March 8. Adam Stockwell scored 19 points and grabbed eight rebounds to lead the Dolphins. Dan Drews was limited to nine points and three rebounds by the bigger Ravens. Stockwell finished his collegiate career with 1,458 points and 498 rebounds. Drews finished with 992 points, 485 rebounds and 45 blocked shots.

Adam Stockwell was named 1996 first-team All-NECC, and Dan Drews received All-NECC honorable mention. Stockwell was also named first-team District I Academic All-American, first-team All-ECAC Division II North and All-Northeast Region as selected by coaches and sports information directors. The 1995–96 Dolphins were inducted into the Le Moyne College Athletic Hall of Fame as a team in 2025.

== Dolphins as Cinderella in NCAA tournament (1996–1997) ==
The Dolphins lost Adam Stockwell and Dan Drews to graduation in 1996. In addition, Dave Langrell did not return for his sophomore season and began a professional career overseas. Stockwell, Drews and Langrell accounted for 55% of Le Moyne's points and 42% of their rebounds during the previous season. Seniors Rob Atene, Dave Ingram and Bob Kawa Jr., redshirt juniors John Henches and Bryan Menar, junior Keith Moyer and sophomores John Tomsich and Kevin Moyer all returned for the 1996–97 season. Henches had redshirted the previous campaign with an ankle injury suffered during the preseason. New freshman Jesse Potter, a 6'7" forward from Boardman High School in Ohio, was injured for most of his high school senior year but impressed Dolphins head coach Scott Hicks during the preseason. Freshman Rashaan Bute, a 6'5" forward from Pittsburgh, was also new to the team. Michael Culley, a 6'3" guard, who was the all-time leading career scorer at North Middlesex Regional High School in Massachusetts and was injured early in training camp, missing several practices, recovered in time to make his debut as a freshman in a preseason exhibition game. Brett Doody, a 6'6" forward, who was a finalist for Mr. Maine Basketball after averaging 27 points per game as a high school senior, was expected to provide outside shooting. Walk-on junior Mike Ondrejko, a 6'2" guard, was also new to the team. Atene, Ingram and Menar were named tri-captains.

The Dolphins earned a 63–53 victory in their inaugural NE10 conference game at Quinnipiac on December 7. Freshman Michael Culley scored 16 points, shooting 5 for 8 from three-point range, to lead Le Moyne. Freshman Rashaan Bute added 14 points, shooting 6 for 8 from the floor. The win was the Dolphins' third straight, improving their record to 3–2 on the season.

Rashaan Bute was named ECAC Division II North rookie of the week for his 14 points and 10 rebounds in the Dolphins' 67–63 home loss against Cheyney on December 14. Le Moyne freshman Jesse Potter joined Bute with his first career double-double, scoring 11 points and grabbing 11 rebounds in the game.

The Dolphins lost the opening game of the Holiday Inn Express Invitational at Stony Brook University Arena to New York Tech, 56–49, on December 28. The score was tied late in the game, and the Bears closed the contest on a 9–2 run to secure the victory. Rashaan Bute scored a team-high 11 points and had three assists to lead Le Moyne, and John Tomsich added eight points and a team-high eight rebounds. The following day, Tomisch scored a career-high 22 points, snatched seven rebounds and blocked three shots to lead the Dolphins to an 85–65 victory over Teikyo Post in the tournament's third-place game. Le Moyne built a nine-point lead by intermission, and the Eagles got no closer than within seven points in the second half. The Dolphins held Teikyo Post to 33% shooting from the floor for the game while hitting 42% of their own shots. Bryan Menar added 16 points, Jesse Potter scored six points and pulled down nine rebounds, Dave Ingram had four points and five assists, and Rob Atene finished with nine points and six steals for Le Moyne. The win snapped the Dolphins' three-game losing streak and improved their record to 4–5.

The Dolphins overcame an eight-point halftime deficit, fueled by an early second-half 13–0 run with all 13 points scored by John Tomsich, and held off a late charge by defending NE10 champion Saint Anselm to earn a 60–59 home win on January 18, 1997. Tomsich finished with a game-high 17 points. Le Moyne limited the Hawks, who entered the game shooting 45% from the floor on the season, to just a 33% clip. Michael Culley added 14 points and shot 4 for 8 from beyond the arc. Jesse Potter had his second straight double-double for the Dolphins with 10 points and 12 rebounds. Rob Atene finished with three points and six assists for Le Moyne. The win was the second straight for the Dolphins and evened their record at 7–7 while improving them to a 4–3 mark in NE10 play.

The Dolphins lost at Division III Hobart, 79–66, on January 29. It was the fourth straight defeat for Le Moyne and the first loss against a Division III, NAIA or NCCAA program since December 28, 1990. The Dolphins had won 24 straight games against such opponents. John Tomsich scored 17 points before fouling out to lead Le Moyne. The Dolphins dropped to 7–11 on the season.

With their injured starting point guard, Rob Atene, missing his fourth straight game, the Dolphins fell behind at home by 13 points in the first half but bounced back with a 22–0 run and upset Bryant, ranked no. 18 in Division II, 82–71. The win ended Le Moyne's five-game losing streak, the longest under the five-year tenure of head coach Scott Hicks. The Dolphins' most recent five-game losing streak had been between December 30, 1988 and January 14, 1989. John Tomsich came off the bench for the first time this season and responded with 22 points and 11 rebounds. Keith Moyer, starting in place of Atene, had nine points, eight rebounds and six assists and was 6 for 6 from the free-throw line in the closing minutes. Freshman Jesse Potter had nine points, 11 rebounds and six assists for Le Moyne. The Dolphins improved to 8–12 overall and 5–7 in NE10 play.

In their final regular-season game, the Dolphins clinched a berth in the NE10 tournament with an 80–64 home win over Bentley on February 22. Le Moyne never trailed in the game and used a 9–0 run to break a tie in the first half. The Dolphins remained in control the rest of the way. John Henches scored 14 points to lead Le Moyne. John Tomsich added 12 points and a game-high nine rebounds. Senior Rob Atene, playing his final home game, finished with eight points, eight rebounds and a game-high six assists. Le Moyne finished the regular season 10–16 overall and 7–11 in NE10 play, earning the no. 7 seed in the conference tournament.

John Tomsich found Dave Ingram with a back-door pass for a layup with four minutes to play, sparking an 8–0 run in the Dolphins' NE10 quarterfinal game at no. 2 seed Assumption on February 24. The basket gave Le Moyne a one-point lead, and the run allowed the Dolphins to secure a 72–66 victory. Tomsich finished with a game-high 18 points and added six rebounds, four steals and one block. Ingram had four points, six rebounds and a team-high six assists. Michael Culley had 16 points and six rebounds and shot 4 for 8 from three-point range for the Dolphins. John Henches added nine points and six rebounds, and Rob Atene had 12 points and four steals.

The NE10 semifinals and final were hosted by top seed Saint Michael's. The Dolphins met no. 3 seed Saint Anselm in their semifinal game. Senior Dave Ingram extended his collegiate career by scoring Le Moyne's final eight points of regulation. His contested triple from the left elbow tied the game with 2.7 seconds left and sent it to overtime. Senior Rob Atene hit four straight free throws to give the Dolphins an eight-point lead with 35.1 seconds to play. After the Hawks hit a three-pointer to cut the lead to five points, they fouled freshman Michael Culley, an 80% free-three shooter. However, Culley missed both shots, and Saint Anselm hit another triple to get within two points. Jesse Potter, a 67% free-throw shooter, was fouled and hit both charity tosses to put the Dolphins ahead, 77–73, with less than 15 seconds left. The Hawks hit another three-pointer at the final buzzer, and Le Moyne held on for a 77–76 win. Ingram finished with 15 points off the bench. Atene had 15 points and six assists. Potter's two late free throws were his only points of the game, but he also grabbed 11 rebounds. John Tomsich scored 25 points and snatched 13 rebounds to lead the Dolphins.

In the NE10 final on March 1, no. 4 seed Bryant, which had upset Saint Michael's in the semifinals, took a 42–41 lead with 13:36 to play. The Dolphins pushed ahead with a 12–6 run over the next eight minutes. The run started with a John Tomsich basket and continued with a Rob Atene steal and fast-break layup. With the Dolphins protecting a six-point lead, Atene scored on a 10-foot turnaround jump shot and then stole the ball and scored on a layup to give Le Moyne a 61–51 lead with 4:22 remaining. The Dolphins went on to a 72–61 victory, and Atene was the tournament's most valuable player. Atene had a double-double with 11 points, 10 assists and two steals, both of which came at pivotal moments. Despite extended stretches on the bench due to foul trouble, Tomsich also had a double-double with 10 points and 11 rebounds. Freshman Jesse Potter gave Le Moyne three players with double-doubles. He finished with a game-high 20 points and grabbed 10 rebounds. Dave Ingram and Bryan Menar held Bryant's All-NE10 guard Noel Watson to 12 points on 5-for-14 shooting. Ingram added eight points. Atene was named NE10 player of the week, and Potter was the conference's freshman of the week.

The NE10 champion Dolphins, making their second straight NCAA tournament appearance, were given the no. 6 seed in the Northeast Regional of the 1997 tournament, hosted by New Hampshire College in Manchester, New Hampshire, and matched against no. 3 seed Saint Rose, ranked no. 11 in Division II, in the first round. Le Moyne was the only club in the field of 48 teams with a losing record. The Dolphins got out of the gate with an early 9–2 lead and were ahead, 40–38, at the break, despite John Tomsich spending much of the first half in foul trouble. After Tomsich was called for his fourth foul three minutes into the second half, the Golden Knights pounded the ball inside and went on a 21–0 run, getting 18 of those points on layups and dunks. Le Moyne was unable to recover and fell, 92–76. Senior Rob Atene scored 19 points to lead the Dolphins and added eight assists and two steals in his final collegiate game. Michael Culley scored 18 points on six three-pointers and added a team-high nine rebounds. Jesse Potter finished with six points, seven rebounds and four blocks for Le Moyne. The Dolphins finished the season 13–17, the first losing campaign for head coach Scott Hicks and the first for the program since the 1985–86 season.

In May 1997, Scott Hicks resigned as the Dolphins' head coach to take the head coaching job at Albany (NY), which was planning to transition to Division I. Hicks was 87–56 in his five years at Le Moyne. Le Moyne athletic director Dick Rockwell said that a search committee would recommend three candidates and that he wanted to name a replacement by the second week of June.

== See also ==
- History of Le Moyne Dolphins men's basketball (1988–1992)
- History of Le Moyne Dolphins men's basketball (1997–2000)
