= 1999–2000 Lamar Cardinals basketball team =

American college basketball season

1999–2000 Lamar Cardinals basketball

Southland tournament champions

NCAA tournament, First Round
- Conference: Southland Conference
- Record: 15–16 (8–10 Southland)
- Head coach: Mike Deane (1st season)
- Home arena: Montagne Center

1999–2000 Southland Conference men's basketball standings
	Conf.				Overall
Team	W		L	PCT	W		L	PCT
Sam Houston State	15	–	3	.833	22	–	7	.759
Louisiana–Monroe	13	–	5	.722	19	–	9	.679
UTSA	12	–	6	.667	15	–	13	.536
Northwestern State	11	–	7	.611	17	–	13	.567
Texas–Arlington	11	–	7	.611	15	–	12	.556
Lamar †	8	–	10	.444	15	–	16	.484
Southwest Texas State	8	–	10	.444	12	–	17	.414
Nicholls State	8	–	10	.444	11	–	17	.393
Southeastern Louisiana	5	–	13	.278	10	–	17	.370
McNeese State	5	–	13	.278	6	–	21	.222
Stephen F. Austin	3	–	15	.167	6	–	21	.222
† 2000 Southland Conference tournament winner Rankings from AP Poll

The 1999–2000 Lamar Cardinals basketball team represented Lamar University during the 1999–2000 NCAA Division I men's basketball season. The Cardinals, led by first year head coach Mike Deane, played their home games at the Montagne Center as members of the East Division of the Southland Conference. The Cardinals finished the season 15–16, 8–10 in Southland play. They won the Southland Basketball tournament and earned an automatic bid into the 2000 NCAA tournament as No. 16 seed in the East region. In the opening round, the Cardinals were beaten by No. 1 seed Duke, 82–55.

== Roster ==
1999–2000 Lamar Cardinals men's basketball team
Players
Coaches

Pos.	#	Name	Height	Weight	Year	Hometown
F		Lewis Arline	6 ft 8 in (2.03 m)	—	Fr
G		Malcolm McCreight	5 ft 8 in (1.73 m)	—	Sr
G		Bobby Manheimer	6 ft 1 in (1.85 m)	—	Jr
G		Kenyon Spears	6 ft 3 in (1.91 m)	—	Jr
G		Thaydeus Holden	6 ft 2 in (1.88 m)	—	Fr
G		Eddie Robinson	6 ft 3 in (1.91 m)	—	Fr
F		Ron Austin	6 ft 3 in (1.91 m)	—	Fr
F		Brennen White	6 ft 6 in (1.98 m)	—	So
F		Brian DeLord	6 ft 5 in (1.96 m)	—	Fr
F		Landon Rowe	6 ft 8 in (2.03 m)	—	Sr
F		Terrell Petteway	6 ft 7 in (2.01 m)	—	Fr
G		V H Sheldon	6 ft 0 in (1.83 m)	—	Sr
F		Marlone Jackson	6 ft 8 in (2.03 m)	—	Sr

Head coach

- Mike Deane

Assistant coach(es)

Legend

- (C) Team captain
- (S) Suspended
- (I) Ineligible
- (W) Walk-on
- Injured
- Current redshirt

[ Roster]

== Schedule and results ==
Schedule
Date time, TV	Rank^{#}	Opponent^{#}	Result	Record	Site (attendance) city, state
Regular season
Nov 20, 1999*		Texas Southern	W 78–62	1–0	Montagne Center (3,036); Beaumont, Texas
Nov 23, 1999*		at Southern Methodist	L 56–67	1–1	Moody Coliseum (2,160); Dallas, Texas
Nov 27, 1999*		Drake	W 62–44	2–1	Montagne Center (2,639); Beaumont, Texas
Nov 30, 1999*		at San Francisco	L 43–69	2–2	War Memorial Gymnasium (2,113); San Francisco, California
Dec 11, 1999*		Tulane	L 45–51	2–3	Montagne Center (3,115); Beaumont, Texas
Dec 14, 1999*		at Louisiana–Lafayette	L 79–81	2–4	Cajundome (3,828); Lafayette, Louisiana
Dec 18, 1999*		Texas A&M	W 76–69 ^{OT}	3–4	Montagne Center (3,765); Beaumont, Texas
Dec 22, 1999*		at Rice	W 51–40	4–4	Tudor Fieldhouse (3,259); Houston, Texas
Dec 28, 1999		Louisiana–Monroe	W 94–92 ^{3OT}	5–4 (1–0)	Montagne Center (3,520); Beaumont, Texas
Dec 30, 1999		Northwestern State	W 70–58	6–4 (2–0)	Montagne Center (4,176); Beaumont, Texas
Jan 3, 2000*		at No. 20 Oklahoma	L 63–67	6–5	Lloyd Noble Center (10,478); Norman, Oklahoma
Jan 6, 2000		at Stephen F. Austin	W 58–56	7–5 (3–0)	William R. Johnson Coliseum (1,034); Nacogdoches, Texas
Jan 8, 2000		McNeese State	W 74–49	8–5 (4–0)	Montagne Center (6,271); Beaumont, Texas
Jan 13, 2000		at Texas State	L 73–74 ^{OT}	8–6 (4–1)	Strahan Coliseum (1,223); San Marcos, Texas
Jan 15, 2000		at Texas–San Antonio	L 58–82	8–7 (4–2)	Convocation Center (2,070); San Antonio, Texas
Jan 20, 2000		Southeastern Louisiana	W 61–55	9–7 (5–2)	Montagne Center (3,653); Beaumont, Texas
Jan 22, 2000		Nicholls State	W 70–63	10–7 (6–2)	Montagne Center (4,756); Beaumont, Texas
Jan 27, 2000		at Sam Houston State	L 51–69	10–8 (6–3)	Johnson Coliseum (3,069); Huntsville, Texas
Jan 29, 2000		at Texas–Arlington	L 69–81	10–9 (6–4)	Texas Hall (1,075); Arlington, Texas
Feb 3, 2000		at Louisiana-Monroe	L 58–95	10–10 (6–5)	Fant-Ewing Coliseum (2,004); Monroe, Louisiana
Feb 5, 2000		at Northwestern State	L 63–65	10–11 (6–6)	Prather Coliseum (1,565); Natchitoches, Louisiana
Feb 10, 2000		Stephen F. Austin	W 82–75	11–11 (7–6)	Montagne Center (3,133); Beaumont, Texas
Feb 17, 2000		at Sam Houston State	L 53–68	11–12 (7–7)	Montagne Center (3,136); Beaumont, Texas
Feb 19, 2000		Texas-Arlington	L 54–55	11–13 (7–8)	Montagne Center (2,773); Beaumont, Texas
Feb 26, 2000		Texas State	W 71–61	12–13 (8–8)	Montagne Center (4,179); Beaumont, Texas
Mar 2, 2000		at McNeese State	L 52–64	12–14 (8–9)	Burton Coliseum (2,279); Lake Charles, Louisiana
Mar 4, 2000		at Southeastern Louisiana	L 49–60	12–15 (8–10)	University Center (472); Hammond, Louisiana
Southland Conference men's basketball tournament
Mar 7, 2000*		at Louisiana-Monroe; Quarterfinals	W 66–62	13–15	Fant-Ewing Coliseum (1,192); Monroe, Louisiana
Mar 9, 2000*		vs. Texas State; Semifinals	W 53–50	14–15	Hirsch Memorial Coliseum (2,856); Shreveport, Louisiana
Mar 11, 2000*		vs. Northwestern State; Championship game	W 62–55	15–15	Hirsch Memorial Coliseum (2,432); Shreveport, Louisiana
NCAA Tournament
Mar 17, 2000*	(16 E)	vs. (1 E) No. 1 Duke; First Round	L 55–82	15–16	Lawrence Joel Coliseum (14,252); Winston-Salem, North Carolina
*Non-conference game. ^{#}Rankings from AP Poll. (#) Tournament seedings in parentheses. E=East. All times are in Central Time.
