= 1988–89 Siena Saints men's basketball team =

American college basketball season

1988–89 Siena Saints men's basketball

NAC regular season and tournament champions

NCAA tournament, Second round
- Conference: North Atlantic Conference
- Record: 25–5 (16–1 NAC)
- Head coach: Mike Deane (3rd season)
- Home arena: Alumni Recreation Center

1988–89 North Atlantic Conference men's basketball standings
	Conf.				Overall
Team	W		L	PCT	W		L	PCT
Siena †	16	–	1	.941	25	–	5	.833
Boston University	14	–	4	.778	21	–	9	.700
Northeastern	12	–	5	.706	17	–	11	.607
Canisius	11	–	7	.611	13	–	15	.464
Hartford	10	–	7	.588	15	–	13	.536
Maine	7	–	11	.389	9	–	19	.321
Niagara	6	–	12	.333	9	–	19	.321
Colgate	5	–	13	.278	6	–	22	.214
Vermont	4	–	14	.222	6	–	21	.222
New Hampshire	3	–	14	.176	4	–	22	.154
† 1989 NAC tournament winner

The 1988–89 Siena Saints men's basketball team represented Siena College in the 1988–89 college basketball season. This was head coach Mike Deane's third season at Siena. The Saints competed in the North Atlantic Conference and played their home games at Alumni Recreation Center. They finished the season 25–5, 16–1 in NAC play to capture the regular season championship. They also won the 1989 North Atlantic Conference men's basketball tournament to earn the conference's automatic bid to the 1989 NCAA Division I men's basketball tournament. They earned a 14 seed in the East Region where they defeated 3 seed and AP #13 Stanford in the first round, before losing to Minnesota.

== Schedule and results ==
- All times are Eastern

Date time, TV	Rank^{#}	Opponent^{#}	Result	Record	Site (attendance) city, state
Regular season
Nov 26, 1988*		at Bowling Green	L 85–87	0–1	Anderson Arena; Bowling Green, Ohio
Nov 28, 1988*		at Pittsburgh	W 80–79	1–1	Fitzgerald Field House; Pittsburgh, Pennsylvania
Nov 30, 1988*		at No. 19 Florida	L 67–71	1–2	Stephen C. O'Connell Center; Gainesville, Florida
Dec 3, 1988*		at Le Moyne	W 91–52	2–2	Le Moyne Athletic Center; DeWitt, New York
Dec 10, 1988*		Marist	W 110–91	3–2	Alumni Recreation Center; Loudonville, New York
Dec 12, 1988*		Fairleigh Dickinson	W 112–69	4–2	Alumni Recreation Center; Loudonville, New York
Dec 23, 1988*		at Manhattan	W 80–65	5–2	Draddy Gymnasium; The Bronx, New York
Dec 29, 1988*		at Evansville	L 70–79	5–3	Roberts Municipal Stadium; Evansville, Indiana
Jan 4, 1989		Boston University	W 91–78	6–3 (1–0)	Alumni Recreation Center; Loudonville, New York
Jan 9, 1989		at Canisius	W 72–56	7–3 (2–0)	Buffalo Memorial Auditorium; Buffalo, New York
Jan 12, 1989		Niagara	W 101–76	8–3 (3–0)	Alumni Recreation Center; Loudonville, New York
Jan 14, 1989		at Vermont	W 69–58	9–3 (4–0)	Patrick Gym; Burlington, Vermont
Jan 19, 1989		Vermont	W 117–79	10–3 (5–0)	Alumni Recreation Center; Loudonville, New York
Jan 21, 1989		at Northeastern	W 92–67	11–3 (6–0)	Matthews Arena; Boston, Massachusetts
Jan 25, 1989		Canisius	W 83–78	12–3 (7–0)	Alumni Recreation Center; Loudonville, New York
Jan 28, 1989		at Niagara	W 72–60	13–3 (8–0)	Niagara Falls Convention Center; Niagara Falls, New York
Jan 30, 1989		New Hampshire	W 90–72	14–3 (9–0)	Alumni Recreation Center; Loudonville, New York
Feb 4, 1989		Hartford	W 82–72	15–3 (10–0)	Alumni Recreation Center; Loudonville, New York
Feb 6, 1989		Colgate	W 109–54	16–3 (11–0)	Alumni Recreation Center; Loudonville, New York
Feb 13, 1989*		at Brooklyn College	Canceled due to Measles outbreak at Siena campus		West Quad Gymnasium; Brooklyn, New York
Feb 16, 1989		at Maine	W 76–49	17–3 (12–0)	Alfond Arena; Orono, Maine
Feb 23, 1989		Maine	W 92–82	18–3 (13–0)	Alumni Recreation Center; Loudonville, New York
Feb 25, 1989		Northeastern	Canceled due to Measles outbreak at Siena campus		Alumni Recreation Center; Loudonville, New York
Feb 27, 1989		at New Hampshire	W 92–79	19–3 (14–0)	Lundholm Gym; Durham, New Hampshire
Mar 1, 1989		at Boston University	L 81–84 ^{OT}	19–4 (14–1)	Case Gym; Boston, Massachusetts
Mar 3, 1989		at Hartford	W 82–70	20–4 (15–1)	Hartford Civic Center; Hartford, Connecticut
Mar 5, 1989		at Colgate	W 100–58	21–4 (16–1)	Cotterell Court; Hamilton, New York
NAC tournament
Mar 7, 1989*	(1)	vs. (8) Colgate; Quarterfinals	W 61–51	22–4	Hartford Civic Center; Hartford, Connecticut
Mar 9, 1989*	(1)	at (5) Hartford; Semifinals	W 81–57	23–4	Hartford Civic Center; Hartford, Connecticut
Mar 11, 1989*	(1)	vs. (2) Boston University; Championship	W 68–67	24–4	Hartford Civic Center; Hartford, Connecticut
NCAA tournament
Mar 16, 1989*	(14 E)	vs. (3 E) No. 13 Stanford; First Round	W 80–78	25–4	Greensboro Coliseum; Greensboro, North Carolina
Mar 18, 1989*	(14 E)	vs. (11 E) Minnesota; Second Round	L 67–80	25–5	Greensboro Coliseum; Greensboro, North Carolina
*Non-conference game. ^{#}Rankings from AP Poll. (#) Tournament seedings in parentheses.
