= Scott Hicks (basketball) =

American basketball coach (born 1966)

Biographical details
- Born: April 3, 1966 (age 60); Oneida, New York, U.S.

Playing career
- 1984–1988: Le Moyne
- 1988: Rheineck Sea Horses
- Position: Forward

Coaching career (HC unless noted)
- 1988–1990: Hamilton (assistant)
- 1990–1992: Syracuse (GA)
- 1992–1997: Le Moyne
- 1997–2000: Albany
- 2000–2004: Loyola (MD)

Scott Hicks (born April 3, 1966) is an American former college basketball coach. He was head coach at Le Moyne College, University at Albany, SUNY and Loyola University Maryland.

Hicks came to Le Moyne as a student-athlete in 1984 to play for coach John Beilein. He was a four-year letterman for the Dolphins, leading the team to the East Regional of 1988 NCAA Division II men's basketball tournament. Following his college career, he played professionally for the Rheineck Sea Horses in New Zealand. He received his first college coaching job as an assistant at Hamilton College, where he served from 1988 to 1990. He then obtained a master's degree in higher education administration from Syracuse University, where he also served as a graduate assistant for the men's basketball team.

In 1992, Hicks was hired by his alma mater as the youngest head men's basketball coach in the NCAA at age 26. He spent five seasons at Le Moyne, compiling a five-year record of 87–56. In 1997, Hicks was hired as head coach at Albany as the school was making a move from Division II to Division I status. Hicks led the Great Danes through the division transition process and led the team to an 11–17 record in its first season as a Division I independent in 1999–2000. He then left for the head coaching position at Loyola in Baltimore, Maryland.

Hicks spent four seasons at the helm of the Greyhounds, compiling a record of 16–97. The 2003–04 season was a particularly dismal one for Hicks and the Greyhounds. The team suffered a 31-game losing streak that began the previous season, going a year and 10 days between wins, and nearly matched the NCAA futility record of 33 straight losses. Hicks was fired after his team went 1–27 for the season.
