= Le Moyne Dolphins men's basketball statistical leaders =

The Le Moyne Dolphins men's basketball statistical leaders are individual statistical leaders of the Le Moyne Dolphins men's basketball program in various categories, including points, rebounds, assists, steals, and blocks. Within those areas, the lists identify single-game, single-season, and career leaders. The Dolphins represent Le Moyne College in the NCAA Division I NEC (historically known as the Northeast Conference).

Le Moyne began competing in intercollegiate basketball in the 1948–49 season. It initially competed as a de facto "small college" program before the NCAA's first official divisional split in 1956. At that time, Le Moyne became part of the NCAA College Division. When the NCAA created its current three-division alignment in 1973, Le Moyne aligned with Division II, not moving to Division I until 2023. This history is significant because the official recording of statistics began at different times in different NCAA divisions.

The NCAA has recorded scoring statistics throughout the "modern era" of basketball, which it defines as starting with the 1937–38 season, the first after the center jump after each made field goal was abolished. Individual rebounding was first recorded in 1950–51, as were individual assists. While rebounding has been recorded in every subsequent season, the NCAA stopped recording individual assists after the 1951–52 season. Recording of assists resumed in D-I in 1983–84, but that statistic was not recorded in D-II until 1988–89. Similarly, while the NCAA started recording blocks and steals in D-I in 1988–89, it did not record those statistics in D-II until 1992–93. Le Moyne's record books include players in all named statistics, regardless of whether the NCAA officially recorded them at that time.

== Scoring ==
Career
Rank	Player	Points	Seasons
1	Laurence Ekperigin	1966	2006–07 2007–08 2008–09 2009–10
2	Len Rauch	1876	1987–88 1988–89 1989–90 1990–91
3	Philip Harlow	1823	1969–70 1970–71 1971–72 1972–73
4	John Tomsich	1760	1995–96 1996–97 1997–98 1998–99
5	Mike Montesano	1759	1991–92 1992–93 1993–94 1994–95
6	Peter Jerebko	1740	1984–85 1985–86 1986–87 1987–88
7	Jene Grey	1729	1975–76 1976–77 1977–78 1978–79
8	James Henderson	1554	1983–84 1984–85 1985–86 1986–87
9	Scott Hicks	1470	1984–85 1985–86 1986–87 1987–88
10	Adam Stockwell	1458	1992–93 1993–94 1994–95 1995–96

Season
Rank	Player	Points	Season
1	Mike Montesano	646	1994–95
2	Adam Stockwell	633	1995–96
3	Laurence Ekperigin	606	2009–10
4	Peter Jerebko	599	1987–88
5	Laurence Ekperigin	567	2008–09
6	Jene Grey	564	1978–79
7	Jene Grey	562	1977–78
8	Scott Hicks	551	1987–88
9	John Tomsich	548	1998–99
10	Philip Harlow	543	1971–72

Single game
Rank	Player	Points	Season	Opponent
1	Kaiyem Cleary	43	2023–24	LIU
2	Philip Harlow	41	1970–71	Clarkson
	Richard Kenyon	41	1954–55	Saint Joseph's
4	Donald Savage	40	1949–50	St. Francis (N.Y.)
	Laurence Ekperigin	40	2008–09	St. Michael's
6	John Tomsich	39	1998–99	Bryant
	Richard Lynch	39	1957–58	St. Peter's
8	Mike Montesano	37	1994–95	Saint Rose
9	Jene Grey	36	1977–78	Buffalo State
	John Tomsich	36	1998–99	Pace
	John Tomsich	36	1998–99	Stonehill
	Laurence Ekperigin	36	2009–10	Adelphi

== Rebounds ==
Career
Rank	Player	Rebounds	Seasons
1	Laurence Ekperigin	1171	2006–07 2007–08 2008–09 2009–10
2	Len Rauch	1151	1987–88 1988–89 1989–90 1990–91
3	Rick May	1028	1970–71 1971–72 1972–73 1973–74
4	John Tomsich	1015	1995–96 1996–97 1997–98 1998–99
5	Jene Grey	969	1975–76 1976–77 1977–78 1978–79
6	Dan Sandel	896	1990–91 1991–92 1992–93 1993–94
7	Wright Lassiter	895	1981–82 1982–83 1983–84 1984–85
8	Jesse Potter	796	1996–97 1997–98 1998–99 1999–00
9	Tom Brown	773	2016–17 2017–18 2018–19 2019–20
10	Kevin Roth	757	2007–08 2008–09 2009–10 2010–11

Season
Rank	Player	Rebounds	Season
1	Laurence Ekperigin	354	2008–09
2	Jene Grey	351	1977–78
3	Laurence Ekperigin	340	2009–10
4	Len Rauch	315	1990–91
5	Dan Sandel	310	1993–94
6	John Tomsich	305	1998–99
7	Rick May	302	1971–72
8	Len Rauch	298	1988–89
9	Len Rauch	291	1987–88
10	Jene Grey	282	1978–79

Single game
Rank	Player	Rebounds	Season	Opponent
1	Richard May	25	1971–72	Ithaca
2	Jene Grey	21	1977–78	East Stroudsburg
3	John Tomsich	20	1998–99	Pace
	Kevin Roth	20	2010–11	American Int'l
	Laurence Ekperigin	20	2008–09	Saint Rose
6	Flagan Prince	19	2002–03	Pitt.-Johnstown
	Jene Grey	19	1978–79	Cortland State
	Laurence Ekperigin	19	2009–10	Adelphi
	Laurence Ekperigin	19	2008–09	St. Anselm
	Laurence Ekperigin	19	2009–10	Adelphi
	Len Rauch	19	1987–88	Adelphi

== Assists ==
Career
Rank	Player	Assists	Seasons
1	Paul Galvin	602	1980–81 1981–82 1982–83 1983–84
2	Russell Barnes	576	1986–87 1987–88 1988–89 1989–90
3	John Haas	561	1989–90 1990–91 1991–92 1992–93
4	Rob Thorpe	543	2000–01 2001–02 2002–03 2003–04
5	Len Rauch	509	1987–88 1988–89 1989–90 1990–91
6	Damani Corbin	471	2005–06 2007–08 2008–09 2009–10
7	Nate Champion	468	2010–11 2011–12 2012–13 2013–14
8	Rob Atene	456	1993–94 1994–95 1995–96 1996–97
9	Qwadere Lovell	392	2012–13 2013–14 2014–15 2015–16
10	Keith Moyer	391	1994–95 1995–96 1996–97 1997–98

Season
Rank	Player	Assists	Season
1	Keith Moyer	215	1997–98
2	Paul Galvin	197	1983–84
3	Rob Atene	191	1995–96
4	John Haas	190	1992–93
5	Kevin Moyer	179	1998–99
6	Paul Galvin	178	1982–83
7	Rob Thorpe	177	2003–04
8	Russell Barnes	173	1987–88
9	Mark Covin	169	2006–07
10	Len Rauch	168	1987–88

Single game
Rank	Player	Assists	Season	Opponent
1	Jakai Sanders	16	2025–26	St. Bonaventure
2	Rob Thorpe	15	2002–03	Alderson-Broaddus
3	Nate Champion	14	2011–12	C.W. Post
4	James Cormier	13	2010–11	Mansfield
	Len Rauch	13	1988–89	Adelphi
6	Luke Postorino	12	2005–06	Green Mountain
	Rob Thorpe	12	2003–04	Bryant
	Russell Barnes	12	1988–89	St. Lawrence
9	Mark Covin	11	2006–07	American Int'l
	Rob Thorpe	11	2003–04	Daemen
	Trent Morgan	11	2004–05	St. Michael's

== Steals ==
Career
Rank	Player	Steals	Seasons
1	Jason Holmes	211	2004–05 2005–06 2006–07 2007–08
2	Russell Barnes	184	1986–87 1987–88 1988–89 1989–90
3	Scott Hicks	178	1984–85 1985–86 1986–87 1987–88
4	Rob Atene	174	1993–94 1994–95 1995–96 1996–97
5	Len Rauch	172	1987–88 1988–89 1989–90 1990–91
6	Rob Thorpe	171	2000–01 2001–02 2002–03 2003–04
7	Damani Corbin	168	2005–06 2007–08 2008–09 2009–10
8	John Haas	162	1989–90 1990–91 1991–92 1992–93
9	Jason Coleman	147	2000–01 2001–02 2002–03 2003–04
	Jamie McArdle	147	2000–01 2001–02 2002–03 2003–04

Season
Rank	Player	Steals	Season
1	Russell Barnes	65	1989–90
2	Rob Atene	62	1995–96
3	Jason Holmes	60	2007–08
	Ryan Roland	60	2019–20
5	Scott Hicks	57	1986–87
6	Rob Thorpe	57	2001–02
7	Andre Dearing	56	1993–94
	Mike DePersia	56	2022–23
9	Jason Holmes	55	2005–06
	Adam Stockwell	55	1995–96
	Scott Hicks	55	1987–88
	Mike DePersia	55	2023–24

Single game
Rank	Player	Steals	Season	Opponent
1	Dave Ingram	8	1994–95	Hilbert
2	Jason Holmes	7	2006–07	Mansfield
	Jason Holmes	7	2005–06	Saint Rose
4	Jason Holmes	6	2006–07	Southern Conn. St.
	Kevin Constant	6	2021–22	Saint Rose
	Kevin Roth	6	2010–11	Stonehill
	Mike DePersia	6	2022–23	Saint Rose
	Nate Gause	6	2014–15	Seton Hill
	Nate McClure	6	2022–23	Angelo St.
	Trent Morgan	6	2004–05	St. Michael's
	Deng Garang	6	2025–26	Massachusetts

== Blocks ==
Career
Rank	Player	Blocks	Seasons
1	John Tomsich	264	1995–96 1996–97 1997–98 1998–99
2	Jim Janson	256	2010–11 2011–12 2012–13 2013–14
3	Laurence Ekperigin	218	2006–07 2007–08 2008–09 2009–10
4	Bill Smolinski	155	1983–84 1984–85 1985–86 1986–87
5	Dan Cromwell	123	2004–05 2005–06 2006–07 2007–08
6	James Henderson	118	1983–84 1984–85 1985–86 1986–87
7	Brett Barnard	116	2000–01 2001–02 2002–03 2003–04
8	Brendan Bayly	91	2000–01 2001–02 2002–03 2003–04
9	Jesse Potter	86	1996–97 1997–98 1998–99 1999–00
	Jamie McArdle	86	2000–01 2001–02 2002–03 2003–04

Season
Rank	Player	Blocks	Season
1	Laurence Ekperigin	81	2008–09
2	Jim Janson	80	2013–14
3	John Tomsich	78	1995–96
4	Jim Janson	75	2010–11
5	John Tomsich	73	1997–98
6	Laurence Ekperigin	72	2009–10
7	Bill Smolinski	62	1985–86
8	John Tomsich	61	1996–97
9	James Henderson	56	1983–84
	Jim Janson	56	2012–13

Single game
Rank	Player	Blocks	Season	Opponent
1	Bill Smolinski	12	1985–86	Clarkson
2	Jim Janson	10	2013–14	Pace
3	Brendan Bayly	7	2000–01	Saint Anselm
	Jim Janson	7	2010–11	Southern N.H.
	John Tomsich	7	1998–99	Glenville State
	John Tomsich	7	1995–96	Molloy
	Laurence Ekperigin	7	2008–09	Saint Rose
8	Jim Janson	6	2013–14	Assumption
	Jim Janson	6	2010–11	Pace
	Jim Janson	6	2013–14	American Int'l
	Jim Janson	6	2010–11	Saint Rose
	Laurence Ekperigin	6	2009–10	Pace
	Robert Jones III	6	2017–18	Saint Anselm
