= Ekperigin =

Ekperigin is a surname. Notable people with the surname include:

- Laurence Ekperigin (born 1988), British-American basketball player
- Naomi Ekperigin, American comedian, actress, and writer
