= History of Le Moyne Dolphins men's basketball (1969–1973) =

NCAA Division I men's basketball team representing Le Moyne College

The history of Le Moyne Dolphins men's basketball from 1969 to 1973 includes the final four years of the coaching reign of Tommy Niland, Le Moyne's head coach since the inception of the program in 1948, and the career of Phil Harlow, one of the Dolphins' all-time greatest players. Le Moyne did not earn a postseason berth but did win the Middle Eastern College Athletic Association (MECAA) championship in 1972–73, Niland's final season, with an undefeated league record. In 1969–70, the Dolphins failed to earn a win against a University Division opponent, the first time since the 1956 split of the NCAA into divisions they were unable to do so. In 1970–71, Le Moyne suffered their first losing season in 19 years. Harlow finished his collegiate career as Le Moyne's all-time scoring leader. As of 2025, Niland remains the program's all-time leader in wins as a head coach.

== A late-season surge for a winning record (1969–1970) ==
The Dolphins lost tri-captains Chuck Brady, Matt Fallis and Mike Kawa to graduation in 1969. Backcourt stars Tom Downey, 5'8", and John Zych, 6'2", both key players on the 1968 and 1969 tournament teams, returned for their senior season, and Downey, the starting point guard, was elected team captain for the 1969–70 season. Downey and Zych had been teammates since they starred together at St. John the Evangelist High School. Also returning were seniors Bob Bradley and Dick Hojnacki, junior John Kutzuba and sophomore John Zagata, who played on the varsity team as a freshman. Zych and Kutzuba were returning from academic ineligibility. The team added five sophomores: Dan Brandt, Charlie Hale, Brian Legg, Dick Seymour and Henry Nirsberger. Three freshmen, Phil Harlow, Mike Dennis and Dick Canty, made the team. Harlow was tabbed as a starter prior to the beginning of the season.

In pre-season polling conducted by the Upstate Sports Information Directors Council, the Dolphins were ranked no. 1 among Upstate New York small college teams.

Trailing, 66–53, in their December 3, 1969 season opener with five minutes to play, the Dolphins closed the game on a 16–4 run, but their frantic comeback attempt came up short, and they fell to Rochester, 70–69. After a pair of Dick Seymour free throws cut the Yellowjackets' lead to a single point with 15 seconds to play, the Dolphins forced a turnover and regained possession with 11 seconds left. However, the ball was knocked out of bounds with one second on the clock, before Le Moyne could get a shot off. Tom Downey's inbounds pass was stolen by Rochester, ending the Dolphins' threat. The Yellowjackets used their height advantage to outrebound the Dolphins, 46–27. Bob Bradley led Le Moyne with a game-high 21 points. Freshman Phil Harlow scored 15 points and drew rave reviews for his ball handling display in his much anticipated Dolphins debut. The Dolphins played without Dan Brandt, who contracted bronchitis just before the start of the season and was expected to be unavailable until after Christmas.

After 14 consecutive victories for the Dolphins, St. Lawrence earned their first ever victory over Le Moyne, 73–62, on December 17, in Canton, New York. The Dolphins shot only 33% from the floor and were plagued by fouls with Bob Bradley, Tom Downey and Phil Harlow all disqualified in the final six minutes. Harlow had 17 points to lead Le Moyne. Head coach Tommy Niland was suffering from the flu and unable to make the road trip. Assistant coach Tom Cooney took the reins on the sidelines.

The Dolphins faced Albany State (GA) in a semifinal of their sixth annual Christmas invitational tournament on December 29, in front of a sellout crowd. The game featured a matchup of Phil Harlow and his brother Howie, who played for Albany State. The Grand Street Boys, a Syracuse-based organization of civic-minded former black athletes, raised money to help defray Albany State's travel costs. After a close first half, which ended with the Golden Rams leading 41–37, Albany State used their significant height advantage and the slick guard play of Joe Reddick, who finished with a game-high 26 points, and Howie Harlow, who were former teammates at Corcoran High School, to break the game open in the second half, building a lead that swelled to as many as 17 points. Adding to the local flavor were three former Central Tech players, Gene Bynum, Ken Lewis and Alex Bullock, in the Albany State lineup. At 6'11", Caldwell Jones was, by far, the tallest player on the floor. While he scored only seven points, Jones was a force under the basket on the defensive end, prompting Le Moyne head coach Tommy Niland to say, "That big guy really hurt us. He took away our offense by batting back plenty of shots." Dan Brandt, the tallest player on Le Moyne's roster at 6'6", got significant minutes for the first time this season, after being slowed by bronchitis since the pre-season, missing the first four games and seeing only limited action in the fifth game against Boston College. Brandt finished with seven points. Phil Harlow scored a team-high 19 points for Le Moyne, besting his brother Howie, who had 17, but the Golden Rams won the game, 82–69.

The following evening, the Dolphins used hot shooting to take control of their consolation game against Hartwick in the later stages of the first half, building a 49–34 lead at the break. Le Moyne shot 52% from the floor, led by senior John Zych, who finished with 32 points. Dick Hojnacki scored nine points and grabbed a team-high 12 rebounds for the Dolphins, who took a 103–79 victory. Freshman Phil Harlow had 25 points and was named to the tournament All-Star team. Le Moyne improved to 3–4 on the season with the win.

The Dolphins traveled to Siena on January 21, 1970, for a game with the Indians and Mike Seymour, brother of Le Moyne's Dick Seymour. The Dolphins used hot outside shooting to gain an early advantage and remained in control of the game all night. John Zych had 20 points to pace the Dolphins and set a new program record with 23 rebounds. Freshman sensation Phil Harlow scored 16 points but did not play in the second half after drawing four first-half fouls. With Le Moyne comfortably in the lead, head coach Tommy Niland elected to give his reserves some playing time and leave Harlow on the bench. Mike Seymour had 17 points for Siena, and Dick Seymour scored two points in limited action for Le Moyne. The Dolphins improved to 4–6 with the win.

Phil Harlow scored a career-high 32 points on 11-for-24 shooting in an 87–83 Dolphins road win at Central Connecticut on February 6. Harlow scored 18 of his points in the second half to help Le Moyne overcome a five-point deficit at the break. Bob Bradley scored 11 of his 17 points in the closing stanza. The Dolphins improved to 6–7 on the season.

After a 68–62 loss at Buffalo on February 21, dropped the Dolphins to 7–10 on the season, the team was determined to win the final four games on its schedule and finish with a winning record. Victories over Ithaca, Saint Michael's, Cortland State, and Siena gave the Dolphins a four-game winning streak to close the season at 11–10. The Dolphins needed a comeback to earn an overtime victory over Saint Michael's. Senior Dick Hojnacki led the Dolphins with 26 points on Senior Night against Siena in an 84–77 victory on March 7. Captain Tom Downey had 20 points in his final collegiate game. In a halftime ceremony, Phil Harlow was presented the Cy Reynolds Memorial Trophy as the team's most valuable player. He was the first freshman to win the award. It was the 12th consecutive winning season and 18th straight non-losing season for the Dolphins. However, this was the first season since the NCAA split into the University Division and the College Division in 1956, in which the Dolphins failed to earn a victory over a University Division opponent. Le Moyne was 11–6 against College Division teams and 0–4 versus University Division foes.

== First losing season in 19 years (1970–1971) ==
Practices for the 1970–71 season opened on October 15, 1970. A week into the workouts, junior John Zagata, who had been projected as a starter, suffered torn cartilage in one of his knees. The injury required surgery, and Zagata was expected to miss at least 10 weeks, which would mean a return to action no earlier than January. However, there was a chance Zagata could miss the entire season. The Dolphins lost four starters, Tom Downey, John Zych, Bob Bradley and Dick Hojnacki, to graduation in 1970. Sophomore Phil Harlow, a 5'10" guard who averaged 20.1 points per game as a freshman, was the only returning starter. Juniors Dan Brandt and Charlie Hale and sophomores Mike Dennis and Dick Canty also returned to the team. Juniors Ed Papworth, a transfer student, and Joe Mulherin, sophomores Bob Kawa, leading scorer on the previous season's freshman team, and Brian Gaetano and freshmen Rick May and Paul Donohue were all added to the team. Aside from Zagata's injury, Brandt, Papworth and Mulherin all suffered minor injuries, and Hale and Dennis contracted the flu during preseason, requiring head coach Tommy Niland and assistant Tom Cooney to participate in scrimmages at times in order to have 10 players on the floor. Harlow was named team captain.

The Dolphins opened their season on December 5, with a 68–62 home victory over St. Francis (NY). Phil Harlow scored 19 points to lead Le Moyne, which built a 38–23 halftime lead and fought off the Terriers second-half comeback attempt. Dan Brandt, starting at center at 6'6", scored 15 points and grabbed eight rebounds. The Dolphins showed depth on their bench, getting four points and nine rebounds from Dick Canty and 10 points from Charlie Hale. Canty and Hale received unexpected playing time with starters Rick May and Ed Papworth both in foul trouble. Despite fouling out, May finished with seven points and seven rebounds. The win was Le Moyne's 50th all-time over a University Division/major program.

After three straight losses dropped the Dolphins to 1–3, Le Moyne anticipated the early return of John Zagata, who was pronounced fit to play for the Christmas invitational tournament. Also back in the lineup was Ed Papworth, who had been injured in early-season action. Freshman Rick May had a double-double with 21 points on 8-for-15 shooting and 13 rebounds to lead the Dolphins to a 78–71 victory over Hobart in the December 29 tournament opener. Le Moyne led by as many as 19 points in the second half but were plagued by turnovers and foul trouble, allowing the Statesmen to get back into the game. Zagata made his season debut and scored only two points, but they came on a key basket late in the game as Hobart was attempting a comeback. The following evening, Tracy Tripucka set a new individual scoring record for the Le Moyne Athletic Center with 40 points to lead Lafayette to an 89–75 win over the Dolphins in the tournament final. Tripucka was named the tournament's most outstanding player. Phil Harlow scored 23 points to lead the Dolphins. Dan Brandt had 21 points and nine rebounds. Harlow and Brandt were named to the all-tournament team.

Phil Harlow matched the Dolphins program record, scoring 41 points on February 18, 1971, in a 97–75 victory at Clarkson. Harlow's total equalled the mark set by Dick Kenyon on January 7, 1955. Rick May had a double-double for the Dolphins with 17 points and 21 rebounds. Le Moyne improved to 7–10 on the season.

The news media reported that head coach Tommy Niland earned his 300th collegiate contest victory on February 24, when the Dolphins won, 72–70, at Cortland State. Le Moyne trailed by seven points at halftime, before a second-half rally sparked by the dominant rebounding of freshman Rick May gave the Dolphins a seven-point lead with less than four minutes to play. The Red Dragons responded with a flurry that cut the lead to two points in the final minute. Phil Harlow, who finished with 19 points, hit a pair of free throws with seven seconds left to extend the lead to four points and put the game out of reach. Mike Dennis scored 21 points to lead the Dolphins. May had 14 points for Le Moyne. Dan Brandt missed the game with the flu. The win improved the Dolphins to 8–11 on the season.

A review of Le Moyne's all-time results indicates that the Cortland State game was only Tommy Niland's 299th win in collegiate contests. Therefore, his 300th victory came three days later in the Dolphins' 78–70 home win over Central Connecticut. It is possible that an exhibition victory over Ithaca in November 1953, was erroneously counted, but that game was played for charity, and NCAA rules at the time did not permit official games to begin until December 1. Captain Phil Harlow scored 24 points to lead the Dolphins in their upset win over the Blue Devils and was recognized as the team's most valuable player in a halftime ceremony. Ed Papworth and Rick May each had a double-double. Papworth scored 19 points and grabbed 14 rebounds, while May had 12 points and 12 boards.

The Dolphins dropped the final game of their 1970–71 season and finished 9–12, their first losing record since 1951–52. The Dolphins were 1–4 against University Division opponents and 8–8 versus College Division foes.

Phil Harlow was named a 1971 second-team New York State College Division All-Star by the New York State Sports Writers Association.

== Harlow becomes Le Moyne's all-time career scoring leader (1971–1972) ==
Le Moyne announced that it would begin fielding a junior varsity basketball team instead of a freshman team for the 1971–72 season.

Leading scorer Phil Harlow returned for his junior season, and leading rebounder Rick May returned as a sophomore. Other returning players were seniors John Zagata, Ed Papworth and Dan Brandt, juniors Mike Dennis, Bob Kawa and Brian Gaetano and sophomore Paul Donohue. New to the team were sophomores Bob Burns, Karl Englebrecht and Jerry Kessler and freshman Ted Grace, who impressed coach Tommy Niland enough to be named a starter for the season opener. Papworth suffered severe ligament damage to his knee early in the preseason and was expected to miss at least two months. Harlow continued in his role as team captain.

Ed Papworth recovered from his knee injury much earlier than expected and made his season debut in the Dolphins' 81–67 loss to Boston College on December 18, playing just a few minutes. With Dan Brandt out with the flu, coach Tommy Niland considered Papworth as an option to start at center in the opening game of the Le Moyne Christmas Invitational against Alfred on December 28. Brandt started the game and played briefly, scoring four points and grabbing six rebounds. Papworth replaced Brandt on the floor and scored eight points while pulling down 12 rebounds. Rick May had a double-double for the Dolphins with 16 points and 16 boards. The slick playmaking of Mike Dennis help Le Moyne shift their offense into high gear, scoring 56 second-half points, after a sluggish opening stanza. Phil Harlow scored 27 points to lead the Dolphins, who romped to a 95–56 victory. Senior Joe Mulherin, who was not on the Dolphins' opening-day roster, was activated and played in the game, making a spectacular play that caught the attention of spectators in a lopsided game. From the defensive end of the court, Mulherin grabbed a loose ball off a missed Alfred shot and, with his back to the offensive basket, snapped it between his legs as a football center would, leading his teammate for an easy layup off one bounce.

The following evening, the Dolphins erased a nine-point lead with less than 15 minutes to play and defeated New Hampshire, 61–58, to win the tournament. Dan Brandt fouled out of the game with 6:25 to play and the score tied on a basket by Bill Stewart of New Hampshire. Brandt was called for a technical foul for not raising his arm on the personal foul call. Stewart hit the free throw to complete the three-point play, putting the Wildcats back into the lead. However, Erie Feragne missed the technical free throw. Rick May, who had a double-double with 17 points and 17 rebounds, hit a bank shot to put Le Moyne back in front. After two more New Hampshire free throws, Mike Dennis hit a pair to give the Dolphins a 59–58 lead. The Wildcats missed the front end of a one-and-one on the next possession. After getting a defensive stop, New Hampshire turned the ball over on a travelling violation with 40 seconds to play. Phil Harlow, who had a game-high 25 points and was named tournament most valuable player, drove to the basket for a twisting layup with 32 seconds left that put the game away. Along with Harlow, May was named to the all-tournament team. The win improved the Dolphins' record to 3–2 on the season and was their 51st all-time over a University Division/major program.

Phil Harlow scored 21 points to eclipse the 1,000 career points mark in a 73–54 Dolphins victory at St. Lawrence on January 12, 1972. Ted Grace and Dan Brandt each had a double-double for Le Moyne. Grace scored 13 points and grabbed 13 rebounds, while Brandt had 15 points and 11 boards. The Dolphins improved to 4–2 with their third straight win.

Rick May set a new program record with 25 rebounds and scored 18 points to lead the Dolphins to an 84–73 home win over Ithaca on January 25. Ted Grace drew the assignment of guarding Dave Hollowell, who came into the game averaging 23 points per contest, and held him to nine points. Grace also scored nine points of his own and pulled down 13 rebounds. Phil Harlow had 22 points for Le Moyne, who improved to 6–4 on the season.

The Dolphins and Iona locked up in a game for the ages during Le Moyne's Winter Weekend celebration on February 26. The Green and Gold did not score their first field goal until nearly four minutes had passed. However, Le Moyne took control of the game and claimed a 40–34 lead at the break. Phil Harlow scored the first three points of the second half to stretch the Dolphins' lead to nine points. The Gaels responded with a 12–2 run to move ahead, 46–45. With the score tied at 54, Iona used an 11–3 run to surge ahead, 65–57, with less than four minutes remaining. Four points from Harlow and jump shots by Brian Gaetano and Bob Kawa got the Dolphins within two points at 67–65. After Iona missed on the front end of a one-and-one, Harlow found Rick May under the basket to tie the game with 42 seconds left. Ed Papworth blocked Iona's drive to the basket with 30 seconds to play. Kawa's jump shot in the closing seconds was off the mark. Papworth and May each missed tap-ins off offensive rebounds before the buzzer ended regulation. The Gaels had a 75–73 lead in the first overtime period, but they missed the front end of a one-and-one with 24 seconds remaining, opening the door for Kawa's 18-foot jumper with seven seconds to play. After Iona was called for travelling, May missed an off-balance shot from 30 feet, sending the game to a second overtime. Iona led 81–79 late in double overtime, but gave Le Moyne another chance, when they missed the front end of a one-and-one with 25 seconds to go. The Gaels' defense got the stop they needed, but Harlow stole the ball and hit a baseline jumper with seven seconds left to tie the score at 81. With Iona leading, 88–87, in the closing minute of triple overtime, Gaetano found Harlow for a layup, and he completed a three-point play with 14 seconds remaining to give the Dolphins a 90–88 lead. Iona's final shot from the corner was off the mark and rebounded by Ted Grace, sealing Le Moyne's victory. Harlow scored 26 points to lead the Dolphins. May had a double-double with 18 points and 13 rebounds. Gaetano added 18 points. May and Gaetano each played the entire 55 minutes. The Dolphins improved to 10–9 overall and 3–2 in MECAA play with the win, their 52nd all-time over University Division/major programs.

In the Dolphins' 86–72 home win over Cortland State on March 2, Phil Harlow scored 33 points to push his career total to 1,356, breaking Le Moyne's three-year varsity program record set by Don Savage in 1951. Rick May had a double-double for the Dolphins with 13 points and 15 rebounds. Le Moyne improved to 11–10 with the win.

Phil Harlow, still a junior with a year of eligibility remaining, scored 23 points to become Le Moyne's all-time career leader with 1,379 points in the Dolphins 74–70 home victory over Siena on March 4.

Phil Harlow scored 28 points in the Dolphins' March 7 season finale to set a new single-season scoring record with 543 points, surpassing the 524 points recorded by Don Savage in the 1949–50 season. Rick May had nine points and 14 rebounds for Le Moyne, while Dan Brandt had a double-double with 13 points and 12 rebounds in his final collegiate game. Harlow was awarded the team's most valuable player trophy. Ed Papworth sat out what would have been his final collegiate game, having suffered a broken wrist against Siena three days earlier. The Dolphins finished 13–10.

Phil Harlow was named 1972 second-team College Division All-New York State by the New York State Sports Writers Association. Harlow was also named an Eastern College Athletic Conference (ECAC) Division II All-Star.

== The final season for Niland and Harlow (1972–1973) ==
The Dolphins lost Dan Brandt, Ed Papworth, John Zagata and Joe Mulherin to graduation in 1972. Le Moyne's all-time leading scorer and captain, Phil Harlow returned for his senior season along with seniors Brian Gaetano and Bob Kawa, juniors Rick May, Paul Donohue and Jerry Kessler and sophomore Ted Grace. Added to the team were Bob Quirk, a junior transfer from Onondaga Community College, sophomore Tom Moody, the leading scorer on the previous season's junior varsity team, and freshmen John Ferraro, Brian O'Connor and Mark Bowka. Harlow continued in his role as team captain for a third year.

On November 16, 1972, Le Moyne announced that Tommy Niland would resign as head coach at the end of the 1972–73 season but would continue in his role as athletic director. Niland cited a desire to spend more time with his family as a reason for his decision. The school said a successor would be named by the end of December. On December 19, Le Moyne announced that assistant coach Tom Cooney would succeed Niland. Cooney played for three seasons on Le Moyne's varsity team and was captain as a senior during the 1963–64 season, during which the Dolphins were MECAA champions and reached the Sweet 16 of the NCAA College Division tournament. Prior to becoming Niland's assistant, Cooney was the head coach at St. Vincent de Paul High School in Syracuse for three seasons.

All five Dolphins starters played the entire 40 minutes in a 65–64 win at Scranton on December 9. Brian Gaetano scored 20 points to lead Le Moyne. Freshman John Ferraro had eight points and grabbed 11 rebounds. Ted Grace had a double-double with 16 points and 10 rebounds. The other two starters were Phil Harlow and Rick May, who finished with 11 and 10 points, respectively. The Dolphins improved to 2–1 overall and 2–0 in MECAA play.

Freshman John Ferraro scored 17 points on 8-for-12 shooting from the floor to lead the Dolphins to a 70–68 win at Iona on January 17, 1973. In the final minute, either Ferraro or Ted Grace (newspaper accounts vary) took a kick to the gut and a left hook to the face from Iona's Jim Riches, which resulted in a bloody nose and precipitated a bench-clearing scrap at midcourt. There were no ejections, and no free throws were awarded. Le Moyne shot only two free throws for the entire game, hitting them both. In contrast, the Gaels were 12 for 21 from the line. Grace finished with nine points, and Le Moyne's senior captain Phil Harlow scored 12. Ray Hyland registered 27 points and 27 rebounds for Iona. The win improved the Dolphins to 5–3 overall and 3–0 in MECAA play and was their 53rd all-time over a University Division/major program.

Phil Harlow exploded for 34 points on 14-for-19 shooting from the floor and a 6-for-6 mark from the free-throw line, leading the Dolphins to a 77–73 upset victory at Gannon on January 20. Le Moyne shot 56% from the field and held the Golden Knights to a 42% clip. Rick May had a double-double for the Dolphins with 13 points and 11 rebounds.

The Dolphins used a 24–4 first-half run to take control of their January 27 home game against Siena and cruised to an 84–72 victory. Le Moyne had five players score in double figures, including Bob Quirk who had 12 points off the bench and (unofficially) handed out 12 assists. Phil Harlow scored a game-high 32 points for the Dolphins. Rick May had a double-double with 10 points and 13 rebounds while holding Siena's 6'10" center Eric Stappenbeck to just 10 points on the defensive end. Le Moyne shot 53% from the floor while limiting the Indians to a 44% clip. The win improved the Dolphins' record to 7–4 overall and 4–0 in MECAA play, clinching at least a share of the league championship.

A 10–0 Dolphins run in the first half of their February 6 home game against St. Francis (NY) gave them an 11-point lead, and the Terriers never got closer than three points down the rest of the way. Le Moyne secured an 83–76 victory and the outright MECAA championship over St. Francis, who entered the contest with a 3–1 league record and a chance to tie for the title. The Dolphins improved to 9–5 overall and completed their conference slate with a perfect 5–0 record. Paul Donohue came off the bench late in the first half, after Ted Grace was called for his third personal foul, and scored a team-high 19 points and grabbed seven rebounds. Freshman John Ferraro had a double-double with 12 points and 10 rebounds for the Dolphins. The game was marred by an incident in the closing minutes. Terriers coach Lester Yellin was upset over a call, and, after letting about a minute pass, began to vehemently express his dissatisfaction to referee Ed Warren. After Warren called two technical fouls in succession, Yellin took a swing at him. St. Francis players and other officials tried to calm Yellin, who collected a total of four technical fouls for the incident, putting what was a 74–70 game with 1:44 remaining out of reach. Yellin got involved with some spectators as he exited the court. Dolphins head coach Tommy Niland later revealed that Yellin had been under unusual stress recently due to the death of both of his parents in an airplane crash. Bob Kawa nearly shot the technical free throws into the wrong basket, but he heard the yelling from the crowd and the Dolphins bench just in time. This was Le Moyne's 54th all-time win over a University Division/major program. The MECAA championship was the Dolphins seventh league title.

Phil Harlow scored four points in the final five seconds, and the Dolphins stole a 72–71 win at Ithaca on February 13. With the Bombers leading, 71–68, Harlow hit a jump shot with five seconds to play. On the ensuing inbounds pass, Harlow tied up Bill Folkins for a jump ball with two seconds left. After losing the tip, Harlow retrieved the loose ball and scored at the buzzer. Harlow finished with a game-high 30 points.

Tommy Niland closed his coaching career with a 65–61 loss at archrival Siena on March 3, 1973. The Dolphins were 13–9 overall in his final season, and as of 2024, his 326 wins and seven NCAA tournament appearances both remain the most ever by a Le Moyne head coach. Phil Harlow scored 29 points in his final collegiate game to finish as Le Moyne's all-time leading scorer with 1,823 points. Brian Gaetano closed his career with 10 points for the Dolphins.

Disappointed over not receiving a bid to the NCAA tournament, the Dolphins players voted to turn down an invitation to the new ECAC postseason tournament.

Phil Harlow was named a first-team District II All-Star by the National Association of Basketball Coaches. Harlow also received honorable mention for the College Division All-State team from the New York State Sports Writers Association.

== See also ==
- History of Le Moyne Dolphins men's basketball (1966–1969)
- History of Le Moyne Dolphins men's basketball (1973–1979)
