= History of Le Moyne Dolphins men's basketball (1948–1958) =

NCAA Division I men's basketball team representing Le Moyne College

The history of Le Moyne Dolphins men's basketball from 1948 to 1958 begins with the inception of the men's varsity basketball program at Le Moyne College. Le Moyne had seven winning seasons and only two losing seasons during their first 10 years. They participated in a postseason tournament, the Utica Optimist Club Invitational, in only their second season. The Dolphins won the Utica tournament three times: in 1950, 1951 and 1952. Le Moyne participated in the National Catholic Invitational Tournament twice, finishing third in 1951, and reaching the quarterfinals in 1952. Although the Dolphins were classified as a small college program by the Associated Press until 1956, when the school became an NCAA College Division member, Le Moyne played 74 games against major/University Division programs during their initial 10 years, going 25–49. The Dolphins were led by head coach Tommy Niland, who mentored the team for its first 25 years. Their team captain for the first three seasons, Don Savage went on to play in the NBA.

== Birth of a program (1948–1950) ==
The Dolphins' first varsity basketball game was a home game at the State Fair Coliseum against Siena on December 7, 1948, a 41–39 loss for Le Moyne. Trailing by eight points with seven minutes remaining in the first half, Le Moyne went on a 21–6 run to claim a seven-point lead at the break. The Dolphins came out cold in the second half, scoring just a single basket in the first 16 minutes, and surrendered the lead. Le Moyne bounced back to tie the game in the final minute, but a buzzer-beating set shot by Roy Peters gave the Indians the victory in front of a crowd of 1,929 fans. Don Savage scored 15 points to lead the Dolphins. The opening game against Siena had been treated by Le Moyne's student body as not simply the debut of the Dolphins as a basketball team but as the first game of what was expected to become a heated rivalry. In anticipation of the game, "BEAT SIENA!" was emblazoned across the front page of the school newspaper. A pep rally was held the night before the Siena game and attended by the team, the head coach, the athletics moderator, Rev. Vincent B. Ryan, S.J., and, of course, the cheerleaders.

Le Moyne's first head coach and athletic director was Tommy Niland, who mentored the varsity basketball team for 25 years, until 1973. Niland remained at Le Moyne after his coaching career ended, continuing in his role as the athletic director until his retirement in 1990. Le Moyne's athletics center is named in his honor.

Le Moyne's first victory came on the road at the Geneva Armory against Hobart on December 10, 1948. Dave Lozo scored three early baskets to give Le Moyne a lead they never relinquished. Coach Niland pulled the Dolphins' starters off the floor midway through the second half with a 22-point lead. Lozo finished the game with 13 points, and team captain Don Savage added 11, as Le Moyne cruised to a 50–37 victory.

During the first three years of its varsity basketball program, Le Moyne was led on the court by Don Savage. Savage had appeared in Le Moyne College's first ever intercollegiate contest on December 4, 1947, a 62–57 overtime victory for the freshman basketball team at Utica. More than 400 Le Moyne students made the trip to see the game. Savage had eight points in that game, while Dave Lozo had a game-high 18 for the Dolphin Cubs. Joe Boehm served as captain of that freshman team, which went 16–4 and was coached by Tommy Niland in an effort to build the basketball program from the ground up. Niland pulled double duty, serving as coach of both the varsity and freshman teams through the end of the 1949–50 season.

A crowd of 2,500 fans witnessed the Le Moyne freshman team's home debut in the nightcap of a doubleheader at the West Jefferson Street Armory on December 18, 1947, a 49–42 victory over La Salle Military Academy that improved their record to 4–0. Dave Lozo scored 18 points for the Dolphin Cubs. Christian Brothers Academy beat Utica Catholic Academy, 45–33, in the opening game of that night's twin bill.

The challenge faced by Le Moyne during its inaugural varsity season was unique. The Dolphins were not simply a first-year basketball team; Le Moyne College was a second-year institution. Therefore, the Dolphins were composed entirely of sophomores and faced teams with experienced juniors and seniors in every game.

Le Moyne's first varsity home victory came on January 7, 1949, over King's by a score of 70–59. The Dolphins were led by Don Savage and Dave Lozo, who each scored 21 points. Le Moyne improved to 3–3 with the win.

Dave Lozo had the highest scoring game by a Le Moyne player during the 1948–49 season, putting up 27 points on January 15, 1949, against Saint Francis (PA) at the Jaffa Mosque in Altoona, Pennsylvania. The Dolphins fell in overtime, 86–80.

More than halfway through their inaugural season, a 53–31 loss at Siena on January 29, 1949, left the Dolphins with a 4–6 record in collegiate contests. A 70–40 home victory over McMaster on February 5, proved to be a turning point, sparking a five-game winning streak.

The second game of the Dolphins' five-game winning streak was an 86–20 victory at Geneseo State on February 11, 1949. The 66-point margin of victory set a program record that would stand until 2005. Don Savage led the Dolphins, who built a 41–8 halftime lead, with 23 points, three more points than Geneseo State's entire output.

After losing on a neutral floor to Brockport in overtime in Auburn, New York, the Dolphins won their final two games of the season, both on the road, one of which was against Cobleskill State and later retroactively recast as an exhibition game under the Bevo Francis rule, to make it seven wins in their final eight games and finish 10–7 in collegiate contests and 12–7 overall, a respectable mark for an all-sophomore team.

All five of Le Moyne's starters from the previous season, including captain Don Savage, returned for the 1949–50 campaign. The returnees were joined by sophomores Jim Hand, Mike Scallion and Joe Taylor. The team trained at Grant Junior High School in Syracuse and scrimmaged against both the Syracuse Nationals, featuring future Naismith Memorial Basketball Hall of Famer Dolph Schayes, and Canisius, Tommy Niland's alma mater, to prepare for the season.

Don Savage scored 40 points, 20 in each half, on 16-for-29 shooting from the floor on December 16, 1949, in a 78–68 loss to St. Francis (NY). The point total was a new high for a Le Moyne player as well as the most points ever scored by any player in a college or professional game at the State Fair Coliseum. The Terriers used a 10–0 run over the first two minutes of the second half to open up a 13-point lead, and the Dolphins were unable to get closer than five points down the rest of the way. Le Moyne fell to 1–4 on the season with the loss.

The Dolphins entered their February 18, 1950 home-season finale with a 4–11 record (4–10 in collegiate contests, since one loss came at the hands of the New York Athletic Club, which, in 1953, was retroactively erased by the Bevo Francis rule) and had suffered a heartbreaking overtime loss at home to rival Siena three days earlier in a game that went to an extra session after Le Moyne's Don Miller missed two free throws with six seconds remaining in regulation that could have sealed a Dolphins victory. The setting was less than ideal for the Dolphins to accomplish something remarkable. Nevertheless, Dave Lozo, the smallest player on the floor at 5'8", exploded for 34 points and led Le Moyne, which overcame a tremendous height disadvantage, to a 78–67 triumph over John Carroll, the Dolphins' first ever win over a major program. Miller redeemed himself after the missed free throws in the Siena game; he entered the game midway through the first half and began guarding 6'8" Bob Roper, who already had 13 points. Roper scored only one point the rest of the game. After the teams played to a 37–37 deadlock in the first half, Le Moyne's defense slowed down the Blue Streaks, holding them without a field goal for the first nine minutes of the second half, and the Dolphins built a 64–50 lead. Le Moyne's advantage swelled to 17 points at 77–60, but Carroll cut the deficit, holding Le Moyne to only one point in the final three minutes as four Dolphins fouled out. However, the Blue Streaks got no closer than 10 points down.

Despite a record of 6–11 in collegiate contests, Le Moyne was invited to a four-team post-season tournament sponsored by the Utica Optimist Club staged at the Utica Free Academy gymnasium. After accepting the tournament bid, the Dolphins played three more road games, winning two of them, to finish the regular season 8–12.

In the tournament semifinal, the Dolphins avenged a loss they suffered in January by beating Brockport, 67–60, on March 15. Don Savage led Le Moyne with 25 points. The following night, Le Moyne found themselves in a tight contest, clinging to a 57–55 lead over Utica, who were playing on their home court. Savage was fouled with about a minute remaining and sank both free throws to extend the Dolphins' lead to four points. Utica scored the game's final basket, but the Dolphins held on for a 59–57 victory and took the tournament title. Savage scored 26 points in the final and claimed the tournament's outstanding player award. The win was the Dolphins' sixth in their final eight games, giving them a 10–12 record in collegiate contests.

== First national postseason appearances (1950–1952) ==
In June 1950, Le Moyne became a charter member of the Eastern Catholic Intercollegiate Athletic Conference (ECIAC). Earlier in 1950, Le Moyne had declined an invitation to join the conference during its initial formation stage. The major concern was the expected difficulty in scheduling home games, since Le Moyne was sharing the State Fair Coliseum with both the Syracuse Nationals and the Syracuse Orangemen. The ECIAC did not schedule conference games for its members. Instead, teams were expected to schedule at least five conference games in order to be eligible for the league championship, which would be determined by winning percentage in conference games. The Dolphins scheduled seven conference matchups for the 1950–51 season, five of which were road games. Shortly before the start of the season, one more home game and one more road game were added to the conference schedule. Before play began, Scranton and Saint Michael's had left the conference. This made Le Moyne's scheduled game against Scranton a non-conference tilt. ECIAC members later agreed that only one designated game against each conference opponent would count in the league standings. Since Le Moyne had two games scheduled against each of King's, Siena and Saint Peter's, three more games were removed from their league schedule, reducing the conference slate to five games. After only one season, the ECIAC ceased publicizing itself as a conference and became an association of its member schools with no basketball champion crowned, leaving Le Moyne an independent again for 1951–52.

The 1950–51 season marked the first time Le Moyne fielded a team that included seniors, and the squad was led by captain Don Savage. Four sophomores were added to the team: Billy Jenkins, Bill Clancy, Tony Donardo and Fred Sheridan, and Jenkins was expected to start. Despite efforts to prepare the team, including scheduling preseason scrimmages against Dolph Schayes and the Nationals, Le Moyne got off to a terrible start, losing their first five games (one of which was against the New York Athletic Club which in 1953, was retroactively erased as a collegiate contest by the Bevo Francis rule) and six of their first seven, all of which were on the road.

The Dolphins opened their season with a 70–68 double overtime loss at Siena on Thanksgiving Day. It was the fifth straight loss to the Indians without a win. Billy Jenkins scored 20 points on 9-for-12 shooting in his varsity debut to lead Le Moyne.

Don Savage scored 18 points, and the Dolphins opened their home schedule with their first ever win over rival Siena, who entered the game 9–0, 53–47, on December 30. Le Moyne scored the game's first nine points and led, 26–17, at the break. The Indians went on an 11–0 run early in the second half to forge ahead, 30–29. Savage responded with a basket that sparked a 13–6 run that returned both the momentum and the lead to the Dolphins, putting them ahead, 42–36. Sophomore Billy Jenkins, who finished with 16 points, scored eight of Le Moyne's points during that critical run. The Dolphins extended the run to 21–10 and took a 10-point lead at 50–40, when Dave Lozo dribbled the length of the floor and converted a layup. An offensive rebound and putback by Don Miller gave Le Moyne their largest lead at 53–42. Both Savage and Jenkins fouled out in the closing minutes, and the Indians scored the final five points of the game, but their comeback fell short. In addition to his offensive production at the game's most important juncture, Jenkins was outstanding on the defensive end, guarding Siena star Billy Harrell and holding him without a field goal. This was Le Moyne's second victory over a major program, and the win proved to be a turning point for the Dolphins' fortunes, igniting a seven-game winning streak.

Don Savage scored 28 points to become the first Le Moyne player to score 1,000 points in a career in the Dolphins' 85–68 win over Brockport on January 6. Dave Lozo followed Savage into the 1,000-point club exactly two weeks later, scoring eight points in a 92–43 home win over Oswego State.

The Dolphins caught an 8:30 a.m. flight for their 2 p.m. Sunday tilt with Saint Francis (PA) on February 11. The Red Flash had won each of their home games at Doyle Hall by at least 10 points over the previous two years. Saint Francis, with an average height of 6'4", used their size advantage to race to an early 24–10 lead. The Dolphins recovered to tie the game and trailed by only three points at halftime. Billy Jenkins had kept the Dolphins in the game by outrebounding his taller opponents. However, while he was on the bench in foul trouble, the Red Flash built a 77–56 lead. After Jenkins returned, the Dolphins went on a run and cut the deficit to two points. One final Saint Francis run extended their lead back to 12 points with one minute to play. Le Moyne scored the game's final six points but fell, 93–87, ending their seven-game winning streak. Don Savage set a new record for most points scored by a player in Doyle Hall with 32.

The Dolphins were again invited to participate in the second annual Utica Optimist Club tournament.

The Dolphins broke the century mark for the first time in program history on February 23, in a 110–80 home win over Saint Peter's. The 110 points was the most ever scored by a college team in a game played in Syracuse. Billy Jenkins had a game-high 33 points for Le Moyne. The Dolphins improved to 11–6 in collegiate contests with their third straight win and 10th in their last 11 games.

Don Savage scored 19 points leading a balanced Dolphins attack to an 86–69 victory over Utica, which was playing on its home court, in the semifinals of the Utica Optimist Club invitational on February 28. The following evening, the Dolphins defeated Hartwick, 86–65, in the title game to secure their second straight tournament championship. Don Savage scored 27 points in the clincher and was named most valuable player for the second straight year. These two wins along with a 20-point home victory over King's in their regular-season finale gave the Dolphins six straight wins and a run of 13 wins in 14 games, pushing their record in collegiate contests to 14–6.

As one of the hottest teams in college basketball, Le Moyne was awarded an at-large berth in the prestigious National Catholic Invitational Tournament (NCIT), the program's first major postseason appearance. At the time, it was not unusual for a team to participate in more than one postseason tournament.

The 1951 NCIT was played at the Washington Avenue Armory in Albany, New York, the arena in which rival Siena, which also received an invitation and got a bye to the quarterfinals, staged 17 of their 18 home games that season, including their double overtime victory over Le Moyne in the season opener. In the first round, Don Savage set a new single-game scoring record for an NCIT game with 33 points, and the Dolphins cruised to a 95–67 blowout victory over Saint Michael's on March 13.

The Dolphins faced Siena, ranked no. 18 in the AP major-program poll, in the quarterfinals in what was essentially a road environment, but Le Moyne came away with a 57–53 victory on March 14. A Dave Lozo layup in the second half gave the Dolphins a 32–31 lead they never relinquished. Le Moyne's lead grew as large as nine points, and the Indians continued to claw their way back into the game, but the Dolphins remained in front. Siena's All-America finalist Billy Harrell was frustrated on the boards by Le Moyne's Joe Endres and guarded ferociously by Billy Jenkins, who had also stifled him in the teams' previous meeting. Harrell finished with only four points. Don Savage led the Dolphins with 20 points. This was Le Moyne's third win over a major program and the first against a team ranked in the AP major-program poll.

Despite 14 points from Don Savage and 12 from Billy Jenkins, the Dolphins fell in the NCIT semifinals, 84–66, to St. Francis (NY) on March 17. The following day, Le Moyne went on to defeat Mount St. Mary's, 63–61, in the third-place game, the final game in the collegiate career of Don Savage, who went on the play parts of two seasons in the NBA with the Syracuse Nationals. The Dolphins had a 61–50 lead with four minutes to play, but Mount St. Mary's went on an 11–0 run to tie the game. Jim Hand's one-handed shot 10 feet from the basket with 13 seconds on the clock provided the winning margin for the Dolphins. Savage was named to the all-tournament first team.

In March 1951, Le Moyne announced they would play home games during the upcoming season in the new Onondaga County War Memorial. Most of the games would be part of doubleheaders that would also feature Syracuse Orangemen home games. Three home games for which the War Memorial was not available were played at the North Syracuse High School gymnasium.

In April 1951, the NCAA granted a blanket waiver allowing freshmen at schools with fewer than 1,000 male students to play varsity basketball to address a manpower shortage caused by the Korean War. Le Moyne opted not to field a freshman team for 1951–52, and allowed freshmen to try out for the varsity team instead. The Dolphins did, however, field a junior varsity team.

The Dolphins elected senior Jim Hand and junior Billy Jenkins co-captains for the 1951–52 season. As they had done the previous year, Le Moyne played several scrimmages against the Syracuse Nationals during training camp. Le Moyne lost Don Savage, Dave Lozo, Joe Boehm, Don Miller and Joe Endres to graduation. Jenkins was the only returning starter. Juniors George Pandelly and Fred Sheridan were expected to start along with Hand and Jenkins. Sophomore Ray Staerker and freshmen Dick Shea and Jack Haggerty were added to the team. Head coach Tommy Niland had expected to start Shea, but the freshman's foot injury during the preseason clouded the plans. A cast was removed from Shea's foot about a week before the season began, and he was undergoing therapy as the campaign was about to begin. Shea's status was unclear the day before the opener.

The Dolphins were blown out in their season opener at the Washington Avenue Armory, 62–41, by Siena on November 22, 1951. Billy Harrell, who had been stifled by the defense of Billy Jenkins in the previous two meetings between the teams, had 11 points for the Indians. Tom Pottenburgh, Siena's 6'9" sophomore newcomer, scored 12 points in his varsity debut. Dick Shea played in the game and scored two points. Fred Byers, Patsy Leo, Bill Feyerabend and John Young were all added to Le Moyne's varsity roster and saw action in the game. Jim Hand was the only Dolphin in double figures with 11 points.

The Dolphins opened their home schedule and made their debut at North Syracuse High School on November 28. After Le Moyne trailed Ithaca by one point at halftime, Fred Sheridan, Billy Jenkins and Jim Hand led a dominant second half that saw the Dolphins outscore the Bombers, 47–27, on their way to an easy 69–50 victory. Sheridan scored a game-high 16 points for Le Moyne.

Le Moyne met Scranton in the first collegiate game at the Onondaga County War Memorial on November 30. The Dolphins led by as many as six points in the first half and still had a one-point lead early in the third quarter, when the Royals began to dominate with their inside game and went on a 12–2 run to close the quarter. The Dolphins could not close the gap, and Scranton won the game, 56–47. Dom De Regis was added to the squad and made his debut. Billy Jenkins led the Dolphins with a game-high 17 points.

The Dolphins entered their January 18 game against rival Siena at the War Memorial with a 3–8 record in collegiate contests. In contrast, Siena was ranked no. 11 in the AP major-program poll. Le Moyne turned what appeared to be an impossible situation into one of the biggest upsets in college basketball that season. After the teams were tied at 25 at the half, Siena took a 29–26 lead in the third quarter. Billy Jenkins scored all eight points during an 8–2 run that gave the Dolphins a 34–31 lead. Le Moyne was unable to pull away, but Siena, hampered by poor free-throw shooting, never tied the game after the burst. With six seconds to play and Le Moyne protecting a two-point lead, a jump ball was called at center court. The ball was tipped by a Dolphin and went out of bounds on the baseline, just as the buzzer sounded. Siena head coach Dan Cunha vehemently protested that the clock had started too early, but the officials ruled the game over, giving the Dolphins a 53–51 victory. Jenkins finished with a game-high 24 points. This was the Dolphins' fourth win over a major program and second over an opponent ranked in the AP major-program poll, both of which came against Siena.

With 10 players available, Le Moyne had seven of them disqualified by personal fouls in their February 24, 1952 game at Gannon. The Dolphins played a four-minute stretch with only four players on the floor and the final minute with just three players. The undermanned Green and Gold fell, 60–58. Billy Jenkins scored 20 points for Le Moyne before fouling out. The Dolphins were called for 42 personal fouls in the game.

Despite a disappointing 5–14 regular-season record, 4–7 against small colleges (including those not affiliated with the NCAA) and 1–7 against major programs, Le Moyne was invited to the 1952 Utica Optimist Club tournament for the third straight year. Sparked by Jim Hand's 22 points, the Dolphins rushed to a 21–8 lead at the end of the first quarter and were ahead by 37–16 at halftime, cruising to a 72–42 victory over host Utica in the semifinal on March 7. Billy Jenkins had 16 points, while Fred Sheridan added 14, and Hand had 13 to lead the Dolphins to a 72–61 victory over Hartwick in the tournament title game, avenging a loss earlier in the season. Jenkins was named the tournament MVP.

Following the victories in Utica, Le Moyne was invited to the NCIT for the second consecutive season. The 1952 tournament was played in Troy, New York, and Le Moyne's student newspaper and local media speculated that the Dolphins may have been invited, at least in part, because of support shown by their fans the previous year. In their first-round game against Providence, the Dolphins surged ahead in the second quarter after trailing by three points at the end of the first quarter. Dick Shea, who finished with 10 points, fouled out midway through the fourth quarter. A short time later, Jack Young, Billy Jenkins and Fred Sheridan all fouled out, leaving Le Moyne thin on manpower and clinging to a four-point lead. The Dolphins went into a deep freeze for the final three minutes to protect their advantage. Le Moyne waived the free throws on five Friars fouls during this deep freeze in order to maintain possession of the ball. Providence was unable to regain possession, and Le Moyne held on for a 67–63 victory on March 15.

Despite 20 points from Freddy Sheridan, the Dolphins fell in their NCIT quarterfinal game, 75–61, to St. Francis (NY) on March 17. Le Moyne finished the 1951–52 season 8–15 in collegiate contests, 1–8 against major programs and 7–7 against small colleges (including those not affiliated with the NCAA).

== Dolphins become consistent winners (1952–1955) ==
Le Moyne moved its home games to the West Jefferson Street Armory in Syracuse for the 1952–53 season. With the other 1951–52 co-captain, Jim Hand, having graduated, the Dolphins elected senior Billy Jenkins captain for 1952–53. Aside from Jenkins, six other players who saw significant playing time the previous season returned: Fred Sheridan, George Pandelly, Dick Shea, Jack Young, Fred Byers and Patsy Leo. Three players who primarily played on the junior varsity team the previous season but saw some varsity action also returned: Jack Haggerty, Bill Feyerabend and Dom De Regis. Four freshmen, Bob Dietz, Dick Kenyon, Bill Phillips and Len Mowins, were added to the team. All 11 of Le Moyne's scheduled home games were to be broadcast on WOLF with the station's sports director, Red Parton, providing the play-by-play.

After splitting the season's first four games, the Dolphins hosted John Carroll on December 19, 1952. A late second quarter burst gave Le Moyne a 31–29 lead at the break. Led by Billy Jenkins, the Dolphins upped the tempo in the third quarter and found success with the fast break, pushing ahead by 60–48 with six minutes remaining in the fourth quarter. A furious comeback attempt by the Blue Streaks, fueled by pressure defense and hot shooting, cut Le Moyne's lead to 68–65 with one minute remaining. However, the Dolphins were 4 for 4 from the free-throw line in the final minute and held on for a 72–65 victory. Jenkins led Le Moyne with 20 points, and freshman Dick Kenyon added 17. Dick Shea held Carroll center Fred Adams to three points and no field goals while scoring 13 points of his own. The win was Le Moyne's fifth over a major program.

Cold shooting in the third quarter doomed Loyola of Los Angeles in their December 30, 1952 game at the West Jefferson Street Armory. The Dolphins outscored the Lions, 20–11, in the quarter and erased a one-point halftime deficit, claiming a 62–54 lead. After Loyola closed the gap to three points, solid free-throw shooting by Patsy Leo, Dick Kenyon and Billy Jenkins kept the Dolphins in front, until a fast-break layup by Fred Byers put away a 79–74 Dolphins victory. Jenkins finished with a game-high 22 points. The win was the sixth over a major program in Le Moyne's history.

Le Moyne entered their January 30, 1953 home game against Boston College with a record of 7–6 after three straight losses, all to major programs. After leading by three at intermission, the Dolphins extended their bulge to five points at the end of the third quarter on a pair of Dick Shea free throws. Le Moyne controlled play in the fourth quarter and put the game out of reach, when Fred Sheridan's pass found George Pandelly for an easy basket, giving the Dolphins a 62–53 lead. Le Moyne held on for a 64–59 win. Shea led the Dolphins with 19 points and had a strong rebounding game. The victory gave Le Moyne seven wins over major programs.

The Dolphins met archrival Siena in their home finale on February 24, 1953. The Dolphins appeared to be in control, holding a 13-point lead with eight minutes to play, when Siena went on a run and cut Le Moyne's lead to 60–56 with 3:20 on the clock. A steal by Billy Jenkins broke up a Siena scoring opportunity, and he hit a free throw after being fouled. Dick Kenyon scored the next four points for Le Moyne on a pair of free throws and a layup, giving the Dolphins a 65–58 lead. Le Moyne hit their free throws down the stretch and held on for a 68–63 victory. Siena center Tom Pottenburgh went to the bench in the second quarter after picking up his third personal foul, and he did not return until the fourth quarter. His scoring keyed Siena's fourth-quarter run that cut Le Moyne's lead to only four points. Pottenburgh finished the game with 10 points. Jenkins scored 16 points for the Dolphins in the final home game for the senior captain. The victory was Le Moyne's fourth of the season over a major program and the eighth in Dolphins history.

Billy Jenkins became the third Le Moyne player to score 1,000 career points in his varsity career during the 1952–53 season.

Despite an impressive 12–8 record in collegiate contests that included a 4–7 record against major programs and an 8–1 mark against small colleges (including those not affiliated with the NCAA), Le Moyne did not participate in the 1953 postseason.

Practices for the 1953–54 season began on November 2, 1953, at Grant Junior High School. The Dolphins lost Billy Jenkins, Freddy Sheridan and George Pandelly to graduation. Senior Dick Shea, juniors Patsy Leo and John Young and sophomores Dick Kenyon, Lenny Mowins and Bob Dietz all returned. Shea was elected team captain. Le Moyne scrimmaged against the Syracuse Nationals, the Syracuse Orange and Cornell during training camp.

In addition to carrying Le Moyne home games, as it did during the previous season, WOLF also planned to broadcast select Dolphins road games during the 1953–54 season with Red Parton continuing in his role as the play-by-play man.

By mid November, practices were moved to the West Jefferson Street Armory, and freshmen Ronnie Mack and Dan Cavellier were expected to make the team. Two other freshman, Bob Smolinski and Bob Canty, were also impressive in pre-season practices. By the latter part of the pre-season, Mack was expected to start.

Just before the start of the 1953–54 season, the Eastern College Athletic Conference (ECAC) passed a regulation barring freshman from playing varsity basketball, unless the institution had fewer than 500 male students. The rule permitted freshmen to play on varsity teams, if the school had fewer than 750 male students and participated in at least two fall, three winter and three spring sports. Le Moyne had 631 male students but only participated in one fall sport: cross country. Although the Dolphins satisfied the NCAA's criteria for allowing freshmen to play, and Le Moyne was not yet a member of the ECAC, it had hopes of joining the conference. The college decided to voluntarily comply with the ECAC rule. Don Savage was appointed head coach of the hastily formed freshman team.

After dropping their season opener at home to St. Bonaventure, the Dolphins fell behind, 20–8, at the end of the first quarter of their December 5 game at Siena. From the start of the second quarter, Le Moyne's defense, led by Patsy Leo and Lenny Mowins, stifled the Indians. After a one-handed shot by Bill Phillips found the basket from 40 feet away, the Dolphins took their first lead, 28-27, with 3:50 to play in the third quarter. Le Moyne scored the next five points to complete a 12–0 run to open the second half and take a 33–27 lead. A basket by Joe McCrudden gave Siena their only points of the third quarter, a period owned by the Dolphins, 14–2. Le Moyne expanded their lead in the fourth quarter and cruised to a 60–40 rout. Dick Kenyon scored 21 points to lead the Dolphins. This was Le Moyne's ninth victory over a major program.

In January, Dolphins reserve John Young had to leave school, because he was called for military duty.

The Dolphins used their speed and pressure defense to overcome a height disadvantage and defeat Boston College, 77–63, on February 5, 1954. Le Moyne claimed an early 8–2 lead and held a three-point edge at the end of the first quarter. Dick Kenyon and Patsy Leo fueled a second-quarter rally that extended the Dolphins' advantage to 39–27 at intermission. Lenny Mowins and Bob Dietz were the catalysts during a 9–4 Le Moyne run that opened the second half and extended the lead to 17 points at 48–31. The Eagles, led by Jack O'Hara, who finished with 17 points, turned things around from there, finishing the third quarter on an 18–11 run that cut the Dolphins' lead to 10 points. Le Moyne tried to slow down the pace of the game in the fourth quarter by keeping possession, but Boston College cut the Dolphins' lead to six points with four minutes to play. The Eagles began fouling in the final minutes to get the ball back, but their target was Dietz, who had won a free-throw shooting competition as a child. Dietz was 8 for 9 from the charity stripe in the fourth quarter, securing the Dolphins victory, their 10th all-time over a major program, in front of their home crowd. Tony Donardo returned to school and the team for this game following an absence due to military service.

The entire Siena squad shook hands with Dolphins' captain Dick Shea, as he was removed from the floor toward the end of his final collegiate game, a 63–55 road victory for the Indians on March 6, 1954. The Dolphins finished the 1953–54 season 10–6 in collegiate contests. They were 2–5 against major programs and 7–1 against United States small colleges (including those not affiliated with the NCAA). They also had a win over a Mexican college.

Le Moyne had four of their five regular starters, including leading scorer junior Dick Kenyon, from the previous season return for 1954–55. The addition of Ron Mack, who had an outstanding season on the freshman team in 1953–54, to the varsity team was highly anticipated. However, Mack suffered torn ligaments in his ankle during a pre-season scrimmage, and his status was uncertain as the season opener approached. Patsy Leo, the only senior on the squad, was named team captain for 1954–55. The team lost captain Dick Shea to graduation and senior Jack Haggerty, who left to become the head coach of the freshman team. Aside from Kenyon, other returning players were juniors Len Mowins, Bob Dietz, Bill Phillips and Jim Spaulding. Practices started on November 1. Sophomores making the team included Mack, Bob Canty, Dan Cavellier, Bob Smolinski and Dick Walser. Head coach Tommy Niland was hopeful that Cavellier could help replace the size lost with the graduation of Shea, last season's starting center. Tony Donardo remained a student at Le Moyne but decided during training camp to end his college basketball career early. Shortly before the season began, Niland announced that Smolinski would be the starting center with Cavellier getting significant playing time.

For the first time in program history, the Dolphins won their season opener, 71–57, over Saint Peter's in front of 1,700 fans at the West Jefferson Street Armory on December 4, 1954. Bob Dietz scored 21 points, 17 of them coming on free throws, for Le Moyne in the first game the team played under the NCAA's new one-and-one free throw rule. Dietz's 17 free throws broke his own program single-game record. The Dolphins outscored the Peacocks, 35–15, from the charity stripe. Dick Kenyon added 16 points, all coming on field goals, for Le Moyne. Ron Mack did not appear in the game, but he made his varsity debut three days later in a loss at no. 8 Niagara.

On December 11, 1954, the Dolphins returned to the Onondaga County War Memorial for their first home game there since February 9, 1952, in a game organized to benefit the Onondaga County chapter of the Association for the Help of Retarded Children. A crowd of 5,000 spectators, the largest to date for a Le Moyne home game, welcomed no. 20 Western Kentucky State. The Hilltoppers used their significant height advantage to control the game most of the way. However, trailing by 16 points, 68–52, with 10 minutes to play, the Dolphins closed the game on a 25–7 run to earn a 77–75 win, one of the biggest upset victories in program history. Dick Kenyon, who had a game-high 29 points, Bob Dietz and Bob Canty provided the offense down the stretch to fuel the late rally. Kenyon had a steal and scored on a fast-break layup to cut Western Kentucky's lead to 70–69 with less than four minutes to play. Dan Cavellier's basket with 2:09 to play gave the Dolphins a 71–70 lead. A pair of free throws by Kenyon extended the lead to three points. Le Moyne hit their free throws the rest of the way and held on for the victory. This was Le Moyne's 11th win all-time over a major program and third over an opponent ranked in the AP major-program poll.

The Dolphins traveled to Albany to meet Siena on New Year's Day in 1955. Le Moyne twice pushed their lead to 15 points early in the second half and held a 51–40 edge, when a 9–0 Indians run led by Tom Pottenburgh and Frank Koenig cut the Dolphins lead to two points. After Le Moyne extended their lead back to six points, two free throws followed by a basket by Koenig brought Siena within two points again at 62–60 with 1:30 remaining. After Koenig's basket, the Dolphins turned the ball over and forced a missed shot on the ensuing possession but gave up an offensive rebound. Le Moyne got the ball back on a traveling call, and Bob Dietz scored on a driving layup to layup to put the game away and give the Dolphins a 64–60 victory. Koenig had 20 points for the Indians, while the Dolphins frustrated the 6'9" Pottenburgh, holding him to just seven points. Dietz had 20 points, and Dick Kenyon had a game-high 22 points for Le Moyne, who improved to 4–1 on the season. The win was the 12th in Le Moyne's history over a major program.

Dick Kenyon set a new Le Moyne single-game scoring record with 41 points on January 7, 1955, in a home victory over Saint Joseph's. The Dolphins used hot shooting to build a 15-point second-half lead, but a late Hawks run cut the margin to four points, 87–83, with two minutes to play. Le Moyne closed the game on a 7–0 run to seal the 94–83 victory. The win gave Le Moyne a 5–1 record on the season and a three-game winning streak in games against major programs. This was the 13th win over a major program in Dolphins history.

The Dolphins lost three players: Bob Canty, Bill Phillips and Dick Walser in February 1955. The players were suspended for academic deficiency. Canty had started several games, and Phillips was a regular member of the rotation off the bench.

The Dolphins met Boston College at Edgerton Park Arena in Rochester, New York on February 4, 1955, in the second game of a doubleheader that opened with Aquinas Institute, alma mater of Le Moyne's Ronnie Mack, facing Erie Prep. Le Moyne built an early lead that got as large at 18 points at 47–29. However, the Eagles stormed back, and the Dolphins found themselves in a game that was tied at 68 with four minutes to play. After a Le Moyne timeout, the Dolphins responded with an 8–0 run over the next two minutes, getting three baskets from Bob Dietz, who finished with 20 points, during the spurt. Boston College scored the next five points to cut the lead to three points at 76–73, but Len Mowins and Dan Cavellier each hit a pair of free throws, and Le Moyne's defense held. A basket by Ronnie Mack, who finished with 17 points in front of his many supporters in the crowd, in the closing seconds iced an 82–73 Dolphins victory. Dick Kenyon led Le Moyne with a game-high 22 points. The win improved the Dolphins' record to 9–3 and was the 14th over a major program in Le Moyne's history.

The Dolphins slumped after the win over Boston College, losing seven straight games, two of which were not collegiate contests. The Dolphins ended the streak with a 113–79 victory at Oswego on March 4. Bob Dietz led Le Moyne with a game-high 30 points. The 113 points scored by the Dolphins was a new high in program history.

The Dolphins closed their 1954–55 season with a home game against Siena on March 5. Senior captain Patsy Leo, playing his final collegiate game, received an appreciative ovation from the crowd of 2,000 fans. Le Moyne started the game hot and claimed a 39–28 halftime lead. The Indians battled back in the second half and moved ahead by the midway point of the frame. However, Bob Dietz, who finished with 22 points, scored 10 points during the game's final 10 minutes to lead the Dolphins to a 78–62 victory. The game was marred by a fistfight between Le Moyne's Dan Cavellier and Tim Hill, who had a game-high 23 points for Siena, two minutes before the final buzzer. Both players were ejected. The win was the Dolphins' fifth of the season and 15th all-time over a major program. Le Moyne finished the season 11–8 in collegiate contests, 5–5 against major programs and 6–3 against small colleges (including those not affiliated with the NCAA).

== Joining the MECAA (1955–1958) ==
In April 1955, the Dolphins and Syracuse Orange reached an agreement to schedule their home games for the 1955–56 season as doubleheaders at the Onondaga County War Memorial.

In June 1955, Le Moyne became a charter member of the new Middle Eastern College Athletic Association (MECAA). The MECAA included teams that were also members of other conferences, a practice not uncommon at the time. When the NCAA split its members into the College Division and University Division in 1956, the MECAA included four teams (St. Francis (NY), Iona, St. Bonaventure and Siena) that joined the University Division, while Le Moyne and Saint Peter's joined the College Division. St. Francis was also a member of the Metropolitan New York Conference, and St. Bonaventure was also a member of the Western New York Little Three Conference. Nevertheless, all six schools initially continued their affiliation with the MECAA after the NCAA split.

Training camp for the 1955–56 season opened on November 1, and was held at Jamesville-DeWitt High School. Seniors Dick Kenyon, Bob Dietz, Jim "Zeke" Spaulding and Lenny Mowins all returned along with juniors Bob Smolinski, Dan Cavellier and Ronnie Mack. Sophomores Bob Hollembaek and Ed Czajka were under serious consideration for starting roles on the team. Another sophomore, Bob Scarborough, was limited during the preseason by strep throat. Later in the preseason, sophomores Frank Bergen and Paul Hennessey were also considered candidates for starting roles. Kenyon and Mowins were elected co-captains. Syracuse University radio station WAER began broadcasting all Dolphins home games, since they were all part of doubleheaders that also included Syracuse Orange home games. Hunter Low, the station's sports director, and John Laudermilch handled the play-by-play.

The Dolphins opened their 1955–56 season with a 78–71 win at Siena on December 1. Le Moyne seized control of the game in the first half and never led by fewer than seven points in the second half. Dan Cavellier led the Dolphins with 20 points and had a strong rebounding game. This was Le Moyne's 16th all-time win over a major program.

The Dolphins finished fifth in the second annual Quantico Marines Christmas Invitational tournament, losing to Quantico, 109–86, in a game that was not a collegiate contest, and then defeating Iona, 93–70, and Georgia Teachers, 94–90. Dick Kenyon was named to the all-tournament team. Bob Dietz led the Dolphins with 21 points against Iona. He had 33 more against Georgia Teachers. The win over Iona was Le Moyne's third straight in games against major programs and the 17th triumph over a major program in Dolphins history. The Dolphins improved to 7–0 in collegiate contests on the season.

Despite a game-high 24 points for Dick Kenyon, the Dolphins suffered their first collegiate contest and first MECAA loss of the season at St. Bonaventure, 80–70, on January 4. It was the 57th consecutive win for the Brown Indians on their home court. Le Moyne fell to 2–1 in conference play with the loss.

In late January 1956, Bob Canty and Bill Phillips, who were ruled academically ineligible a year earlier, returned to the team.

The Dolphins ended a skid of four straight losses in collegiate contests with a 92–76 victory over Boston College at Mount Carmel High School in Auburn, New York on February 3, in a game organized for charity. Dick Kenyon returned to the lineup after missing the previous game with a virus and scored a game-high 31 points to lead Le Moyne. The victory improved the Dolphins' record in collegiate contests to 8–4 and was Le Moyne's 18th all-time win over a major program.

The Dolphins won their fourth straight game in a home tilt against Iona on February 17. Le Moyne raced to an early 20–5 lead, before the Gaels battled back and pushed ahead, 37–36. The Dolphins controlled the late stages of the first half and claimed a 49–43 edge at intermission. Le Moyne built a 14-point lead at 68–54 with 13 minutes remaining, but Iona came back again, cutting the margin to just two points at 82–80 with less than four minutes to play. Le Moyne's Dan Cavellier scored the game's only basket the rest of the way, and the Dolphins were 6 for 8 from the free-throw line in the closing minutes, as their defense held tight, limiting the Gaels to just a pair of free throws down the stretch. Bob Dietz led Le Moyne with 25 points. Dick Kenyon added 23 points, 19 of them in the second half as Iona was making its run to get back into the game. The Dolphins' 90–82 victory improved their record to 12–5 in collegiate contests and 3–1 in MECAA play, keeping them in the hunt for the conference title. This was the 19th win over a major program in Le Moyne's history.

St. Bonaventure shot 51% from the floor while holding Le Moyne to a 35% clip and cruised to an 81–61 road win over the Dolphins on February 22, ending Le Moyne's five-game winning streak. Dick Kenyon and Dan Cavellier each had 16 points to lead the Dolphins. The loss dropped Le Moyne to 13–6 in collegiate contests and 3–2 in MECAA play.

The Dolphins were eliminated from the MECAA title race on February 25, when a 71–70 victory by St. Francis (NY) at Siena gave the Terriers a 4–1 league record with no conference games remaining.

Dick Kenyon had a game-high 22 points and became Le Moyne's all-time career points leader in the Dolphins' 73–58 home victory over Cortland State on February 29. Kenyon played four years of varsity basketball, because freshmen were temporarily allowed to play in 1952–53, while Savage was a varsity player for only three seasons.

The Dolphins closed their season with an 82–59 home victory over Siena on March 2. Le Moyne broke a 10–10 tie in the first half and led the rest of the way. The Indians kept the game close and trailed by only two points at the half, but the Dolphins built a 17-point lead early in the second stanza. Siena cut the lead to eight points at 56–48, but Le Moyne responded with a 10–4 run capped by a Bill Phillips layup to take a 66–52 lead with five minutes remaining. Bob Dietz, the fifth 1,000-point scorer in Dolphins history, led Le Moyne with 29 points and passed Billy Jenkins for third place on the program's all-time career points list. The win was Le Moyne's fifth of the season and 20th all-time over a major program.

Although one of the stated goals of the MECAA's founding institutions was to avoid overemphasis on athletics, Le Moyne's inaugural MECAA campaign was their best season on the court up to that point, their final year in the pre-division NCAA. The Dolphins finished 15–6 in collegiate contests, including 5–4 against major programs and 10–2 against small colleges (including those not affiliated with the NCAA). They finished tied for second place out of six MECAA teams, ahead of two major-program league members.

Dick Kenyon was named a 1956 first-team MECAA All-Star, while Bob Dietz was named to the second team.

Starting in 1956, a new NCAA rule changed the first date on which basketball practices may be held from November 1 to October 15, and Le Moyne took full advantage, opening practices on the earliest date possible. The Dolphins faced the loss of two big scorers, Dick Kenyon and Bob Dietz, to graduation. Dan Cavellier was the only returning starter. Also returning from the previous season's squad were Bob Smolinski, Ronnie Mack, Frank Bergen, Ed Czajka and Bob Hollembaek. Back with the team after fulfilling his military commitment was John Young, who last played during the 1953–54 season. Because Young's junior year was interrupted by military service, he was still classified as a junior for the 1956–57 season. The addition of sophomore Dick Nendza to the team was widely anticipated. Preseason practices were held at Grant Junior High School. Mack, a senior, was elected team captain.

In preparation for the December 1 season opener at Siena, a 20-car motorcade from Syracuse to Albany was organized to transport Le Moyne supporters to the game, and plans were made to have a Le Moyne cheerleader dressed as a deceased Siena Indian and carried into the arena in a funeral procession with the pep band playing a dirge. The Dolphins dominated the game from the opening minutes with Bob Smolinski scoring 14 of his game-high 16 points in the first half and Dan Cavellier controlling the paint on the defensive end while adding 15 points. After Ed Czajka and Frank Bergen got into foul trouble, sophomores John Dobbertin and Dennis Morrissey were pressed into service, and the Dolphins' lead unexpectedly grew, as coach Tommy Niland learned his bench was stronger than he had thought. Dobbertin finished with eight points, and Morrissey had four. Another sophomore, Dick Nendza, also made his collegiate debut. Le Moyne shot 46% from the floor while holding the Indians to a 17% clip. Siena had only three baskets in the first half, the second coming after 14 minutes had elapsed, and trailed 33–14 at intermission. The Dolphins romped to a 74–41 victory. This was Le Moyne's first game as a member of the NCAA's new College Division and their 21st win over a University Division/major program.

A medical examination revealed that Bob O'Connor, a promising sophomore who coach Tommy Niland described as "the best defensive player on the squad," had a back problem that originated at birth. O'Connor's varsity basketball career ended without playing a single game.

The Dolphins set a new program record for points scored as well as a new mark for a college team playing at the Onondaga County War Memorial in a 122–65 blowout victory over St. Lawrence on December 8. Nearly all Le Moyne's second-half minutes were played by reserves, and Ed Czajka led the Dolphins with 26 points off the bench, 24 of which came after intermission. Six Le Moyne players scored in double figures.

The Dolphins lost their leading scorer, Dan Cavellier, when he required an emergency appendectomy on January 1, 1957. Ten days after the procedure, it was expected that Cavellier would be out of the lineup until at least early February.

Five Dolphins scored in double figures as Le Moyne earned a home victory over Siena, 68–59, on January 19. Le Moyne improved to 5–3 on the season with the win, their 22nd over a University Division/major program.

Dan Cavellier returned to the Dolphins' lineup, scoring eight points on four baskets, in Le Moyne's 66–56 win at Plattsburgh State on January 26. John Young, who scored 22 points, led Le Moyne, who took control early in the game. Frank Bergen hit some key free throws down the stretch to secure the victory as the Dolphins improved to 6–3.

In late January, Bob Hollembaek, who had been a reliable scorer and excellent defender, withdrew from Le Moyne due to scholastic difficulties. Hollembaek had become the focus of the Dolphins' offense and developed into a floor leader, while Dan Cavellier was recovering from his appendectomy. Cavellier was still playing only limited minutes at the time of Hollembaek's departure.

The Dolphins turned in a spirited effort in their February 2 home game against Manhattan, but they were unable to overcome their lack of depth. After trailing only 37–34 at the break, Le Moyne surged ahead three times in the second half. Midway through the stanza, John Young fouled out. A minute later, Frank Bergen was carried off the floor after injuring his knee. The Jaspers took over from there, beating the Dolphins, 81–71. Bob Smolinski led Le Moyne, who dropped to 6–5 on the season, with 20 points. Dan Cavellier scored 14 points for the Dolphins, as he continued to improve following his recovery from an appendectomy. Bergen missed the rest of the season with his ankle injury.

With Le Moyne short on manpower, Dolphins soccer goalkeeper Dick Reddington made his varsity basketball debut in a home game against Hobart on February 8. Captain Ronnie Mack scored 25 points to lead Le Moyne to a 76–52 victory that improved the Dolphins' record to 7–5. Le Moyne held the Statesmen to 25% shooting from the field while hitting 41% of their own shots.

After losing the first five meetings between the teams, the Dolphins upset St. Francis (NY), a team that returned most of its core rotation players who won the 1956 MECAA championship and reached the 1956 NIT semifinals, 77–71, in a February 9 home game. The Terriers struggled to score against Le Moyne's zone defense, and the Dolphins built an eight-point halftime lead, 41–33. St. Francis was held scoreless for the first five minutes of the second half, and Le Moyne's lead swelled to 17 points at 50–33. The Terriers chipped away at the lead, as the Dolphins tied to slow the game down. However, Le Moyne hit their free throws down the stretch and held a comfortable 13-point lead with three minutes to play. Captain Ronnie Mack scored 23 points to lead the Dolphins, who improved to 8–5 on the season and 3–2 in MECAA play, keeping Le Moyne in the conference-title race. The win gave the Dolphins 23 victories over University Division/major programs.

The Dolphins dropped a 76–72 road decision to Iona on February 16, ending their hopes for a MECAA title. Le Moyne fell to 8–7 on the season and 3–3 in league play.

The injury and eligibility problems that plagued the Dolphins made it difficult for them to play consistently, and Le Moyne finished 10–9 in collegiate contests and 3–4 in MECAA play. The Dolphins were a respectable 3–4 against University Division opponents but a disappointing 7–5 versus College Division and non-NCAA foes. All four of Le Moyne's University Division losses came against teams that received NIT bids. A fifth loss came at the hands of Saint Michael's, who went to the NCAA College Division tournament.

Dolphins senior Dan Cavellier was named to the 1957 All-MECAA second team, and Bob Smolinski earned All-MECAA honorable mention.

Le Moyne ended its agreement with the Syracuse Orangemen to play home games as part of doubleheaders at the Onondaga County War Memorial and moved back to the West Jefferson Street Armory for the 1957–58 season.

The Dolphins began practices on October 16, at Grant Junior High School and moved them to the armory on November 1. The team lost Dan Cavellier, Bob Smolinski and Ronnie Mack to graduation. Returning players included seniors Frank Bergen, Ed Czajka and John Young and juniors John Dobbertin, Dick Nendza and Dennis Morrissey. Le Moyne requested and secured a favorable ruling on Young's eligibility, since he played a few games during the 1953–54 season as a junior, before being called for military service, and then played the full 1956–57 season as a junior. Bob Scarborough, who played as a sophomore during the 1955–56 season but was ruled academically ineligible for the 1956–57 season, returned to the team. The Dolphins expected to add sophomores Dick Lynch, George Woyciesjes, Charlie Smith and Jim Burke. As the preseason progressed, sophomores Bill Young and John Finnegan and John Gieselman, a junior transfer from Niagara, emerged as candidates for the rotation. Bergen was elected team captain.

The Dolphins lost their fourth straight game in the opener of the Saint Vincent Invitational Tournament in Latrobe, Pennsylvania, falling to Saint Francis (PA), 70–51, on December 27, 1957. The Red Flashes used their height advantage to claim a rebounding edge and take control of the game early. Bob Scarborough scored 10 points to lead Le Moyne. After taking an early five-point lead in the consolation game the following evening, the Dolphins surrendered a late first-half run to Albright and were unable to recover the rest of the way, dropping a 77–67 verdict. Ed Czajka scored 17 points to lead Le Moyne, who fell to 1–5 on the season.

Junior transfer John Gieselman, who, during the preseason, had been expected to have a role on the team but had not yet appeared in a game, was not on the roster for the Saint Vincent tournament. He was unable to play due to shin splints. Gieselman never appeared in a game for Le Moyne.

In their first home game in four weeks, the Dolphins snapped their five-game losing streak with a 66–56 victory over Scranton on January 4, 1958. Sophomore Dick Lynch led the Le Moyne attack with 27 points.

On February 1, 6'5" Ed Czajka and 6'4" Charlie Smith were ruled academically ineligible, a serious blow to the already undersized Dolphins. Le Moyne suffered their first home loss of the season that evening, 80–72, to Saint Michael's and fell to 4–7. Captain Frank Bergen led the Dolphins with 16 points. Four nights later, the Dolphins dropped another decision at home, 65–50, to St. Bonaventure, their 13th loss in as many tries against the Brown Indians. Dennis Morrissey at 6'1", receiving additional playing time in the absence of Czajka, was the high rebounder in the game and had a front tooth knocked out in a melee under the boards. He was not expected to miss any games.

John Dobbertin and George Woyciesjes collided during practice on February 7. Dobbertin required three stitches to repair the cut on his head. Woyciesjes suffered a cut inside his mouth. Dobbertin, Woyciesjes and Dennis Morrissey, who required dental work after the St. Bonaventure game, all played in the Dolphins' next tilt, an 87–76 victory at Hobart the following day. Dobbertin led Le Moyne with 25 points on 11-for-18 shooting from the floor. Dick Lynch had 23 points and also shot 11 for 18. Morrissey, who finished with six points, and John Young had big rebounding games, controlling the boards for Le Moyne. In earning their first road win of the season, the Dolphins ended their three-game losing streak and improved to 5–8.

The Dolphins overwhelmed Iona, 64–44, at the armory on February 14, for their third straight win, improving to 7–8 on the season and 1–3 in MECAA play. Dick Lynch hit his first eight shots from the floor, displaying an array of jump shots and layups on quick cuts to the basket, as Le Moyne built a big lead early. He had 16 points in the first 12 minutes of the game and finished with 22, after he was guarded closely by Joe Bernardi in the second half. The Gaels made a run early in the second half and cut the Dolphins' big lead to eight points at 46–38. However, Le Moyne responded with an 18–0 run over six minutes to move in front, 64–38, and put the game away. This was Le Moyne's 24th all-time victory over a University Division/major opponent.

Dick Lynch scored 39 points, a new record for a MECAA game, but it was not enough as NIT-bound Saint Peter's defeated the Dolphins, 81–67, in Jersey City on February 21.

Early in the Dolphins' February 22 game against St. Francis (NY) in Brooklyn, John Young, Le Moyne's best rebounder, suffered what appeared to be a broken finger in a play under the basket. Al Innis, the Terriers' 6'7" center, dominated the game from that point forward, finishing with 25 points and leading St Francis to an 86–73 victory. John Dobbertin led the Dolphins with 18 points. The Terriers played a box-and-one defense with a focus on slowing down Dick Lynch, who was held to 12 points. Le Moyne fell to 8–10 on the season and 1–5 in MECAA play. Young's injury was later determined to be a triple dislocation of the finger. He played only five minutes in the Dolphins' next game, an 88–76 victory at St. Lawrence on February 25. Dennis Morrissey led Le Moyne with 26 points in that game.

Le Moyne's home finale against Siena on March 1, got off to a slow start. Three minutes had passed before the Indians scored a basket to claim a 2–0 lead, and 6:35 passed before Frank Bergen tied the score at 2. Siena's efforts to slow the game down were initially successful, as they held a 37–30 lead with 12 minutes to play, when John Young, who was now playing a full complement of minutes following some healing of his finger injury and had a strong game under the boards, fouled out. Just when the situation appeared bleak, the Dolphins' up-tempo offense kicked into gear with a pair of Dick Lynch jump shots sparking a 10–0 run that put Le Moyne ahead, 40–37. After Siena responded to tie the game at 42, the Dolphins scored six straight points to lead, 48–42, with three minutes remaining. After a Siena basket, Lynch's three-point play extended the margin to seven points at 51–44. Le Moyne hit their free throws in the closing minutes to repel a desperate comeback attempt and held on for a 58–50 victory. Lynch had a game-high 17 points for the Dolphins. Le Moyne improved to 11–10, the first time they were above the .500 mark since they were 1–0. They closed their conference slate with a 2–5 record. This was Le Moyne's 25th win over a University Division/major program.

The Dolphins came within a whisker of upsetting NIT-bound Saint Joseph's at the Palestra in Philadelphia in their season finale on March 5. Le Moyne led the Hawks, 68–64, with a minute to play. However, Saint Joseph's tied the game with two quick baskets. The Dolphins were holding for a final shot on the ensuing possession, but the Hawks forced a turnover and called time-out with 11 seconds to play. Bob McNeill was fouled with four seconds on the clock. After missing his first free throw, he hit the second, giving Saint Joseph's a 69–68 lead. The Dolphins were unable to get off a final shot. Dick Lynch led Le Moyne with 28 points. It was the final collegiate game for John Young and captain Frank Bergen. Young had a strong rebounding game against his much taller opponents, which included 6'9" Bob Clarke, and finished with 16 points on 7-for-9 shooting. Bergen scored 10 points in his coda.

Despite the season-ending loss to Saint Joseph's, the Dolphins won seven of their final 10 games to rebound from a 4–8 start and finish 11–11. Five of their losses came against teams that received NIT bids: St. Bonaventure twice, Saint Francis (PA), Saint Peter's and Saint Joseph's. Le Moyne was 2–6 against University Division opponents and 9–5 versus College Division and non-NCAA foes.

Le Moyne sophomore Dick Lynch was named to the All-MECAA first team, and senior John Young earned honorable mention. A printer's error that affected Le Moyne's 1957–58 media guide was presumed to be the reason the MECAA identified Dick Lynch as John Lynch in its press releases.

== See also ==
- History of Le Moyne Dolphins men's basketball (1958–1960)
