= History of Le Moyne Dolphins men's basketball (1973–1979) =

NCAA Division I men's basketball team representing Le Moyne College

The history of Le Moyne Dolphins men's basketball from 1973 to 1979 includes the coaching reign of Tom Cooney. Although Le Moyne did not have a losing record in any of the six seasons under Cooney and had an overall record of 82–63, the Dolphins failed to reach the postseason. Rick May became the first Le Moyne player to record 1,000 career rebounds as a senior during the 1973–74 season. The Middle Eastern College Athletic Association (MECAA), the conference in which Le Moyne had been a member since 1955, dissolved following the 1975–76 season. Coach Cooney's first recruiting class turned out to be his best, producing a 15–7 record as seniors in the 1976–77 season. They were led by John Lauer and Pete Hogan, both of whom ended their careers in the top six among Le Moyne's all-time leading scorers. Although the Dolphins were not selected for the 1977 NCAA tournament, Le Moyne athletic director Tommy Niland believed they deserved a bid, and that the best 32 teams were not chosen. The Dolphins played their first ever game against Division I power Syracuse, located only four miles away, during the 1977–78 season. Jene Grey, who was selected in the 1979 NBA draft, finished his Dolphins career as the program's second leading all-time scorer and rebounder.

== Tom Cooney takes the reins (1973–1974) ==
On November 16, 1972, Le Moyne announced that Tommy Niland would resign as head coach at the end of the 1972–73 season after 25 years as the Dolphins head coach. On December 19, Le Moyne announced that assistant coach Tom Cooney would succeed Niland. Cooney played for three seasons on Le Moyne's varsity team and was captain as a senior for the 1963–64 season, during which the Dolphins were MECAA champions and reached the Sweet 16 of the NCAA College Division tournament. Prior to becoming Niland's assistant, Cooney was the head coach at St. Vincent de Paul High School in Syracuse for three seasons.

Le Moyne became a Division II institution, when the College Division was split in 1973. Practices for the 1973–74 season opened on October 15, 1973. The Dolphins lost captain Phil Harlow, who was their all-time leading scorer, Brian Gaetano and Bob Kawa to graduation for Tom Cooney's inaugural season as head coach. Rick May and Bob Quirk returned for their senior seasons and were named co-captains. Junior Tom Moody and sophomores John Ferraro, Brian O'Connor and Mark Bowka also returned. New to the team were 6'0" junior transfer Bob Braunitzer from St. Lawrence, sophomores 6'4" Mark Daly and 5'8" Gary Jackson and freshmen 6'4" Bob Burkhard, 6'5" Pete Hogan and 6'7" John Lauer. Ted Grace, a key player for the Dolphins as a freshman and sophomore the previous two seasons, gave up basketball to devote more time to his Islamic faith.

Radio broadcasts of Dolphins games had ceased after the 1971–72 season. Le Moyne's own WLMU broadcast live coverage of three home games during the 1973–74 season with commentary by Kevin Cooney and Bruce Sedlak. They hoped to expand coverage next season, if the station's budget was adequate.

Dolphins head coach Tom Cooney earned his first victory in his second game at the helm, a 76–74 upset at Potsdam State on December 4. Le Moyne used a full-court press to stage a comeback from a seven-point second-half deficit. John Ferraro, who scored 16 points to lead the Dolphins, hit a pair of free throws on a one-and-one opportunity to break a 74–74 tie with 29 seconds remaining and provide the winning margin.

Le Moyne's Christmas invitational tournament returned in 1973, after a one-year hiatus. The Dolphins were 4–1 and riding a four-game winning streak entering the event. There was heightened interest in the tournament, since one of the participating teams was Catholic, which was coached by former Dolphins star Dick Myers. Myers and Le Moyne head coach Tom Cooney were teammates for three years, and both were starters on Le Moyne's 1963–64 team that went to the NCAA tournament. Both have since been enshrined in the Le Moyne Athletic Hall of Fame. Freshman John Lauer scored 25 points on 9-for-13 shooting to lead the Dolphins to a 95–68 victory over Hamilton in the tournament opener on December 28. Fifteen of Lauer's 25 points came during a decisive second-half run during which Le Moyne outscored the Continentals, 36–22, stretching their seven-point lead to a 21-point bulge with less than five minutes to play. John Ferraro had a double-double for the Dolphins with 13 points and 11 rebounds.

The following evening, Potsdam State closed the game on a 14–3 run over the final 6:25 to erase a seven-point Dolphins lead and win the tournament final, 78–74. Ted Bence scored 23 points to lead the Bears and was named the tournament's most valuable player. Rick May had a double-double for the Dolphins with 19 points and a game-high 14 rebounds and was named to the all-tournament team. Bob Braunitzer had 13 points to go with the 15 he scored against Hamilton and joined May on the all-tournament squad. John Lauer and John Ferraro were each held to 10 points in the final.

Freshman Pete Hogan scored 32 points, and Rick May grabbed 18 rebounds to lead the Dolphins to an 84–77 home triumph over Saint Michael's on January 19, 1974, ending both their own six-game losing streak and the Purple Knights' six-game winning streak. Hogan started in place of freshman John Lauer, who missed his second straight game with a broken bone in his foot. Le Moyne improved to 6–7 on the season with the victory.

Pete Hogan continued to shine, filling in for the injured John Lauer, scoring 20 points in the Dolphins' 72–66 upset home victory over Hartwick on January 23. Le Moyne was also missing injured starting forward John Ferraro, who suffered a sprained ankle in the Saint Michael's game. Freshman Bob Burkhard started in his place and responded with a double-double, scoring 18 points and grabbing 11 rebounds. Rick May, who had recently become the ninth player in program history to reach 1,000 career points, contributed nine points and 11 rebounds for the Dolphins, who evened their record at 7–7. Hartwick's loss cast doubt over their NCAA tournament hopes.

John Ferraro returned to the lineup in a 101–81 loss at Assumption on February 2. John Lauer was back in action and scored four points in a 58–54 win at Cortland State on February 6. Pete Hogan scored a game-high 16 points and grabbed seven rebounds for the Dolphins. Rick May had nine points and 12 rebounds. Le Moyne improved their record to 8–9.

Freshman Pete Hogan, a graduate of St. Joseph's Collegiate Institute, just outside of Buffalo, New York, scored 28 points and grabbed nine rebounds in his return home to lead the Dolphins to a 103–97 victory at Buffalo on February 20. Rick May had a double-double for Le Moyne with 17 points and 17 boards. The Dolphins shot 53% from the floor, while holding the Bulls to a 43% clip. The win was the Dolphins' fourth in five games and improved their record to 11–10 on the season. This was Le Moyne's 55th all-time victory over a Division I/major program.

The Dolphins used a 17–0 first-half run to build a 31–12 lead in their February 23 home game against Iona. However, the Gaels battled their way back into the game and trailed by only eight points less than two minutes into the second half. With Le Moyne nursing a three-point edge, Bob Quirk hit a pair of free throws with nine seconds to play, putting away a 79–74 victory for the Dolphins. Quirk and John Ferraro scored 16 points each to lead Le Moyne. The Dolphins improved to 12–10 overall and completed their MECAA slate 2–3 with the win, their 56th all-time against a Division I/major program.

Rick May became the first Le Moyne player to record 1,000 career rebounds in the Dolphins' 105–75 home win over Clarkson on February 26. May had a double-double in the game with 12 points and 12 rebounds. Pete Hogan scored 22 points to lead Le Moyne, who shot 52% from the floor while holding the Golden Knights to 38% accuracy. The Dolphins led by only nine points at halftime but exploded for 62 second-half points to earn the blowout victory. All 12 players on Le Moyne's roster got into the scoring column. The Dolphins improved to 13–10 on the season, ensuring Tom Cooney of a winning record in his first year as head coach.

The Dolphins closed their season with a non-conference home game against NCAA tournament-bound Siena on March 2. The Indians were awarded a tournament bid despite being required by the Eastern College Athletic Conference (ECAC) to forfeit several wins, because they erroneously used an ineligible player. The selection committee noted that Siena self-reported the violation and had played well since the player was taken out of the lineup. The ineligible player did not appear in Siena's 101–79 home victory over Le Moyne on January 26. Senior co-captain Rick May had a double-double in his final collegiate game with 22 points and 17 rebounds, leading the Dolphins to an 87–81 triumph. He finished as Le Moyne's all-time leading career rebounder with 1,028. Bob Quirk, the Dolphins' other senior co-captain scored 18 points to close his career. Le Moyne finished the season 14–10 on a four-game winning streak and with victories in seven of their final eight games. The Dolphins were 4–5 against teams that secured bids to the 1974 NCAA Division II tournament and 2–2 versus Division I foes.

== Early struggles and a strong finish (1974–1975) ==
The Dolphins opened practice for the 1974–75 season on October 15. Co-captains Rick May, Le Moyne's all-time leading career rebounder, and Bob Quirk were both lost to graduation. The arrival of three high-profile freshmen was greatly anticipated. Mike Gehm, a 6'1" guard, Ed Kopp, a 6'5" center, and Steve Singer, a 6'3" forward, were decorated New York state high school stars who had all committed to Le Moyne in the spring. Seniors Bob Braunitzer and Tom Moody, juniors Brian O'Connor, John Ferraro and Gary Jackson and sophomores Pete Hogan, John Lauer and Bob Burkhard all returned to the team. Junior Frank Hojnacki and sophomore Jim Fletcher were added after successful seasons on the junior varsity team. The Dolphins also welcomed Dan Maycock, a 6'4" sophomore transfer frontcourt player, who was a Navy veteran and previously played at LSU. Dave Zalewski, a 5'11" sophomore, was added to the roster at the conclusion of the preseason. Gehm earned a spot on the varsity roster during the preseason, while Kopp and Singer were added to the junior varsity team.

The Dolphins hosted Canisius, featuring Larry Fogle, the top scorer in college basketball the previous season with an average of 33.4 points per game, on December 9, 1974. The Golden Griffins took control of the game early, building a 15-point lead with less than five minutes remaining in the first half. A burst that included three baskets by John Lauer cut the Dolphins' deficit to nine points at intermission. Le Moyne kept the game tight in the second half, and five straight points by Lauer gave the Dolphins a 49–48 lead with 3:46 remaining. After Canisius went back in front by a point, captain Bob Braunitzer's basket put Le Moyne ahead, 51–50, with 2:57 to play. The Golden Griffins responded with an 8–0 run, getting two baskets each from Tim Stokes and Kenny Kee, to secure a 58–53 victory. The Dolphins held Fogle to 23 points, only 10 of which came after halftime, and 10 rebounds. Braunitzer scored 15 points to lead Le Moyne, and Lauer had a double-double with 13 points and 11 boards. The loss dropped the Dolphins to 0–4 on the season.

John Lauer's double-double led the Dolphins to their first win of the season, a 66–57 triumph at Ithaca on December 11. Lauer scored 19 points and grabbed 11 rebounds. Le Moyne hit their first seven shots from the floor and led by 14 points at halftime. Jim Fletcher's passing sparked the Dolphins' offense; he finished with four points and 11 rebounds. Starters Pete Hogan and Bob Burkhard were both out with injuries. After playing the earlier junior varsity game, freshman Ed Kopp was pressed into duty with Le Moyne shorthanded. He scored three points in the varsity game after getting 18 in the JV game.

The Dolphins built a 14-point lead with a 10–2 run early in the second half of the opener of their Christmas tournament game against Muhlenberg on December 27, and cruised to a 78–68 victory. Pete Hogan scored a game-high 23 points on 10-for-14 shooting for Le Moyne. The Dolphins played without starting guard Bob Braunitzer, who was out with the flu.

The following evening, Hartwick's guards outscored the Dolphins backcourt, 27–6, as Bob Braunitzer, still bothered by the flu, was limited to spot duty. The Warriors took the tournament title game, 69–57. Pete Hogan and John Lauer were named to the all-tournament team.

Bob Braunitzer scored 22 points to lead the Dolphins to a 65–58 win at Iona on January 14, 1975. Le Moyne's leading scorer, Pete Hogan, missed the game with the flu. The Gaels led by three points at halftime, before the Dolphins surged ahead. Steals by Braunitzer and John Ferraro in the final minute, both of which led to Dolphins baskets, put the game away for Le Moyne. The Dolphins improved to 3–7 with the win, their 57th all-time over a Division I/major program.

At midseason, WSYR reached an agreement with Le Moyne to broadcast three Dolphins home games in February 1975. Le Moyne's own radio station, WLMU, broadcast the Dolphins' season finale at Siena on March 1.

In a game that featured 16 lead changes and five ties, sophomore Dave Zalewski, who finished with 16 points, made the difference in overtime, going 6 for 6 from the free-throw line, leading the Dolphins to an 83–77 home victory over Buffalo. For the game, Le Moyne shot 17 for 20 from the charity stripe, while the Bulls were just 9 for 12. Zelewski got additional playing time, because Gary Jackson was out with a leg injury. John Lauer scored a game-high 26 points for Le Moyne. Dolphins head coach Tom Cooney missed the game with chicken pox. Junior varsity coach Fran Satalin stepped in for Cooney. The win was the fifth in six games, improving Le Moyne to 7–8 on the season. This was Le Moyne's 58th all-time victory over a Division I/major program.

The Dolphins defeated St. Francis (NY), 79–64, in a home game on February 15. After having started the season 3–8, this win was the Dolphins' fifth straight and ninth in 10 games, improving their record to 12–9 overall and 2–2 in MECAA play. This was Le Moyne's 59th all-time victory over a Division I/major program.

The Dolphins finished the 1974–75 season 14–11 overall and 2–3 MECAA play.

== Final MECAA season (1975–1976) ==
The Dolphins lost Tom Moody and their captain and biggest outside shooting threat, Bob Brauntizer, to graduation in 1975. Returning to the team were seniors John Ferraro, Gary Jackson and Frank Hojnacki, juniors Pete Hogan, John Lauer, Bob Burkhard, Jim Fletcher and Dave Zalewski and sophomore Mike Gehm. Ferraro was named team captain. Le Moyne added four freshmen to the varsity roster. Jene Grey, a heavily recruited 6'4" frontcourt player from Sidney High School, who averaged 23.7 point and 22 rebounds per game as a senior was thought to be the biggest prize. Tom Fletcher, a 6'5" Central New York Cities League all-star from Christian Brothers Academy, joined his brother Jim on the team. Mike Ruff, a 5'11" guard who averaged 12.3 assists per game in leading Fairport High School to a sectional championship was described by Dolphins head coach Tom Cooney as "the best passer I've seen in my seven years of scouting high school players." Guard Steve Nieves, who sat out his high school senior year with a blood clot in his thigh and attended Le Moyne part-time the previous academic year, was now enrolled full-time and set to play his freshman season.

Shortly after the season started, Le Moyne reached an agreement with WSEN-FM to broadcast seven Dolphins road games and three home contests. Tom Pipines provided the play-by-play for weekday games, and Jim Lowery handled the weekends. Color commentary was furnished by former Dolphin Tom Downey.

After starting the season 0–4, the Dolphins got a double-double from John Lauer and cruised to a 106–56 home win over Cortland State on December 13, 1975. Lauer scored 25 points and grabbed 14 rebounds. Pete Hogan added 20 points for Le Moyne. The Dolphins shot 58% from the field while holding the Red Dragons to 34%.

The Dolphins opened their annual Christmas tournament with a 91–68 victory over Lincoln (PA) on December 29. John Lauer led the Dolphins with a game-high 33 points and 11 rebounds. Le Moyne shot 50% from the floor and held the Lions to a 32% clip. Twelve of the 13 Dolphins on the roster scored in the game. New NCAA rules limited the number of players a team could take to road games to 10. After the sixth Lincoln player fouled out with 1:45 remaining, the Lions had to play the remainder of the game with four players on the floor.

The following evening, the Dolphins won the tournament with an 81–69 victory over Bloomsburg State. John Lauer had another double-double with 13 points and 17 rebounds and was named the tournament most valuable player. Gary Jackson scored 14 points and was named to the all-tournament team. John Ferraro and Pete Hogan scored 15 points each for the Dolphins, and freshman Jene Grey added 10. Le Moyne shot 53% from the field while holding the Huskies to 44%. The Dolphins outrebounded Bloomsburg State, 42–35. Le Moyne improved to 3–4 on the season.

The Dolphins built a 10-point lead in the first eight and one-half minutes of their January 14, 1976 home game against Gannon, ranked no. 4 in the NCAA Division II poll. However, the Golden Knights immediately responded with a run to get back into the game. The teams exchanged the lead 14 times the rest of the way, and Gannon was ahead, 59–57, with 19 seconds to play. Gary Jackson and Bob Burkhard both missed shots to tie the game, and the ball went out of bounds with just one second remaining. John Ferraro inbounded the ball to John Lauer, whose turnaround jump shot beat the buzzer, sending the game to overtime. The Golden Knights went ahead, 65–62, with 1:08 to play in overtime. Ferraro responded with a jump shot that cut the lead to one point with 51 seconds left. After Gannon was called for travelling, the Dolphins found Pete Hogan for a 10-footer that gave them a 66–65 lead with 13 seconds left. The Golden Knights' failed to score in the closing seconds, and the Dolphins held on for the victory. Lauer had a double-double with 19 points and 14 rebounds. The Dolphins improved to 4–5 overall and 1–2 in MECAA play. Lauer followed up his effort with 16 points and 10 rebounds in an 87–66 home win over Saint Michael's on January 17, and was named ECAC Division II player of the week.

After starting the season 0–7 on the road, the Dolphins broke through with a 72–59 win at Cortland State on February 12. John Lauer had a double-double with 18 points and 11 rebounds to lead Le Moyne, who improved to 8–9 on the season.

The Dolphins held off a late charge by Iona on February 21, and survived with an 89–88 home victory. John Lauer led Le Moyne with 22 points. The win improved the Dolphins record to 9–11 on the season and was their 60th all-time versus a University Division/major program.

Pete Hogan scored a game-high 25 points and became the 10th Dolphins player to surpass 1,000 career points in Le Moyne's 99–74 home win over Clarkson on February 24.

The Dolphins won their season finale, 81–77, over Siena on March 4, to even their record at 12–12. Freshman Mike Ruff ran the offense with poise down the stretch in a tight game, and his pass to Jene Grey, another freshman, led to the clinching basket. A third freshman, Tom Fletcher, had a steal and a layup that gave the Dolphins a five-point lead with 2:11 to play. Grey, who finished with 19 points, scored Le Moyne's final five points of the game. Optimism abounded with the play of the three yearlings. John Lauer had a double-double for the Dolphins with 20 points and 12 rebounds and became the 11th player in program history to score 1,000 career points. Senior captain John Ferraro scored six points in his final collegiate game. This was Siena's final game as a Division II program. The Indians' move to Division I for the 1976–77 season meant Le Moyne would not play its long-time archrival again until December 1987.

John Lauer was named to the 1976 ECAC Division II all-conference team. Dolphins freshman Jene Grey received honorable mention. Lauer was also named second-team Division II All-New York State.

== Exit of Lauer and Hogan and emergence of Grey (1976–1977) ==
New rules that were effective for the 1976–77 season required Division I teams to schedule at least 75% of their games against Division I opponents. It was the anticipation of these rules that caused Iona to leave the MECAA after the 1973–74 season. As a Division I team, it became impractical for St. Francis (NY) to remain in the MECAA, since it would require scheduling games against each of the non-Division I members. Since Siena transitioned to Division I for the 1976–77 season, it left the MECAA as well. Also effective for the 1976–77 season was a rule requiring conferences that were members of the NCAA to either have all their members be part of the same NCAA division or to divide the conference in a manner to separate conference members by NCAA division. The remaining members of the MECAA were Le Moyne, Gannon and King's from Division II and Scranton from Division III. Although the MECAA had never been a member of the NCAA, having members in different NCAA divisions would make that impossible in the future. Therefore the MECAA was dissolved, and Le Moyne began competing as an independent in the 1976–77 season.

Despite Siena's move to Division I, there were plans for Siena to play at Le Moyne on January 15, 1977, and for the Dolphins to continue their series with their archrivals, reduced to one game per season. However, Siena notified Le Moyne in September 1976, that it would be unable to keep its commitment for that date. Le Moyne had no open dates on which a game with Siena could be scheduled. As a result, the two teams did not meet during the 1976–77 season, ending their annual series which started with the first varsity game Le Moyne played on December 7, 1948.

The Dolphins lost John Ferraro, Gary Jackson and Frank Hojnacki to graduation in 1976. Returning to the team were seniors John Lauer, Pete Hogan, Bob Burkhard, Jim Fletcher and Dave Zalewski, junior Mike Gehm and sophomores Jene Grey, Tom Fletcher, Mike Ruff and Steve Nieves. Moving up from junior varsity were sophomores Dan Fiaschetti, a 6'3" forward and Mike Chandler, a 6'1" guard. Newly recruited freshmen guards Dan Marquardt, who was 6'3", and Al Collins, who was 6'4", made the varsity squad. Collins was an all-Westchester County selection who averaged 21.8 points and 12 rebounds per game at Port Chester High School. Marquardt was a three-year starter at Franklin Delano Roosevelt High School in Hyde Park, New York, who averaged 29.6 points per game while shooting 58% from the floor as a senior. Lauer, known to his teammates as "Cakes", was named team captain. Bob Kawa, a player for the Dolphins from 1970 to 1973, joined head coach Tom Cooney's staff as an assistant.

Bob Burkhard, starting in place of Pete Hogan, who was expected to miss five to six weeks with a chipped bone in his right ankle, responded with a double-double, scoring 10 points and grabbing a game-high 18 rebounds to lead the Dolphins to a 95–52 home victory over Potsdam State on December 7, 1976. Tom Fletcher scored a game-high 24 points for Le Moyne, and Jene Grey added 19 points on 7-for-8 shooting. The Dolphins shot 56% from the field and outrebounded the Bears, 49–39. Le Moyne improved to 3–2 on the season. The Dolphins wore their road uniforms for the game, because Potsdam State had not yet received their own road uniforms and had only white togs available.

Jene Grey came down with shingles, and John Lauer was suffering from a bruised thigh prior to the Dolphins' December 11 game at Cortland State. Lauer played in the game, a 72–67 overtime loss, but he injured his foot in the first half. X-rays revealed a broken bone in Lauer's foot. The Dolphins were just at the start of a four-week break in their schedule, since they were not participating in a holiday tournament. When Le Moyne returned to action on January 8, 1977, Lauer and Pete Hogan were still unavailable, and Grey played only half of the game. The Dolphins lost, 65–61, at Saint Michael's, falling to 3–4 on the season.

Jene Grey, playing through double vision resulting from his recent bout with shingles, had a double-double with 19 points and 13 rebounds to lead the Dolphins to an 89–79 home victory over Boston College on January 12, 1977. Bob Burkhard scored a game-high 20 points, and Mike Ruff dished out six assists for Le Moyne. Pete Hogan saw limited duty, returning from a chipped bone in his ankle, and scored four points for the Dolphins. The win evened Le Moyne's record at 4–4 and was their 61st all-time victory over a Division I/major program.

At mid-season, WSEN-FM agreed to broadcast five Dolphins home games and three road contests during January and February 1977. Tom Pipines called play-by-play for weekend games, and Jim Lowery was on duty for weeknights.

With Le Moyne short on manpower, Dolphin reserves Bob Burkhard and Jim Fletcher stepped up and led the Green and Gold to a 75–67 win at Ithaca on January 19. Burkhard had a game-high 25 points, and Fletcher had a double-double with 12 points and 13 rebounds. John Lauer made his return after missing more than a month with a broken bone in his foot but saw only limited action. Pete Hogan, in his third game back from a chipped bone in his ankle, was still not playing his full complement of minutes. Jene Grey and Al Collins were serving a one-game suspension for missing the team bus on the way home from Rochester following the previous game. The Dolphins improved to 6–4 with the win, their third straight.

Jene Grey had a double-double with 21 points and 11 rebounds, both game highs, and played stifling defense on Gerard Trapp of St. Francis (NY) to lead the Dolphins to a 74–66 home victory on January 22. Grey scored 17 of his points in the second half. Mike Ruff had seven assists for Le Moyne, who won their fourth straight game and improved to 7–4. This was Le Moyne's 62nd all-time win over a Division I/major program.

Jene Grey hit four clutch free throws in the final 30 seconds to cap his double-double and lead the Dolphins to a 61–58 win at Canisius on February 12. With Le Moyne nursing a three-point lead, Grey hit both ends of a one-and-one. Mike Hartnett's jump shot with 16 seconds to play cut the Golden Griffins' deficit to three points, and Dave Spiller stole the ensuing inbounds pass and scored to cut the lead to one. Grey, who was a 67% free-throw shooter on the season, canned two more free throws on a one-and-one with 12 seconds to go to ice the game. John Lauer scored a game-high 25 points for the Dolphins. Grey had 16 points and grabbed 15 rebounds. The win was Le Moyne's fourth straight over a six-day span and ninth in their last 11 games and gave them 63 all-time victories over Division I/major programs.

At 12–6 on the season, the Dolphins were on the short list of teams under consideration for an NCAA tournament berth in mid February.

The Dolphins overcame a six-point deficit with six minutes to play, tying their February 16 home game against Buffalo on a pair of free throws by Bob Burkhard with 1:09 to play, which were the last points scored in regulation. In overtime, Le Moyne used a 16–0 run to put the game away and cruised to a 97–87 victory. Jene Grey and John Lauer each had a double-double for Le Moyne. Grey scored 21 points and grabbed 13 rebounds, while Lauer had 20 points and 11 rebounds. Tom Fletcher scored 22 points on 9-for-13 shooting to lead the Dolphins and added four rebounds and six assists. The win gave the Dolphins a 4–0 record versus Division I opponents on the season and five straight wins against Division I teams going back to the previous season. This was Le Moyne's 64th all-time victory over a Division I/major program.

The Dolphins suffered a crushing loss, 72–70, at Buffalo State on February 19, that appeared to dash their hopes for an NCAA tournament bid. With the score tied at 68 in the closing minutes, freshman Al Collins, who finished with 14 points, was fouled driving to the basket and missed both free throws. Oleh Czmola scored a basket for the Bengals with 1:19 to play and then stole a Mike Ruff pass on Le Moyne's next possession. Freshman Bucky Strong hit a pair of free throws to extend Buffalo State's lead to four points. Collins hit from 20 feet to bring the Dolphins back within two points, and Jim Fletcher stole the ensuing inbounds pass. Tom Fletcher launched a 20-footer with seven seconds to go, but it fell short, and Buffalo State held on for the victory. John Lauer scored 16 points to lead the Dolphins, despite spending much of his time on the bench in foul trouble and nursing the foot he had injured earlier in the season. Buffalo State took advantage of the situation each time Lauer was not on the floor. The Bengals scored the first four points of the second half with Lauer on the bench after getting called for three first-half fouls. In contrast to the Dolphins' glittering results against Division I opponents, the loss dropped Le Moyne to 2–5 versus Division II foes with just three games remaining on their schedule, one at Division I Iona and two against Division III teams. The Dolphins' overall record stood at 13–7, and Le Moyne was running out of opportunities to impress NCAA tournament selectors, who had a meeting scheduled two days later. Nevertheless, three regions of the tournament were regarded as weak, and Le Moyne was highly respected due to the strength of its schedule. It remained possible for the Dolphins to get selected to play in the tournament and get sent to another region of the country.

The Dolphins kept their hopes for an NCAA tournament bid alive with a 90–72 home win over St. Lawrence on February 22. NCAA tournament selectors had met earlier that day but did not extend any new bids. John Lauer's double-double with 28 points on 11-for-16 shooting, 14 rebounds and two blocked shots led Le Moyne. Lauer fought his way through a sprained ankle. Dave Zalewski, pressed into duty after Mike Ruff got into foul trouble, came off the bench to score nine points on 4-for-6 shooting and notch four steals. The Dolphins shot 52% from the floor while holding the Saints to a 46% clip. The Dolphins' next game was originally scheduled at Iona on February 26. However, the Gaels cancelled the game in order to comply with the maximum game limit required to be eligible for the ECAC Metro tournament. Since the NCAA tournament selectors anticipated making a final decision on February 27, and the Dolphins would not play again until March 1, their 14–7 record would be the basis on which their fate rested.

The Dolphins were not selected to play in the 1977 NCAA tournament, much to the dismay of athletic director Tommy Niland who noted that Le Moyne had embarrassed one of the teams that received a bid, alluding to Le Moyne's 11-point victory over Assumption. Niland also indicated that he believed the selection committee had failed to choose the 32 best Division II teams in the country. Instead, regional selectors protected teams within their region, resulting in teams with as many as 11 losses getting invitations.

The Dolphins won their season finale, 79–56, over Alfred on senior night at the Henninger Athletic Center. All five graduating seniors from head coach Tom Cooney's first recruiting class started the game for Le Moyne. John Lauer scored a game-high 19 points and finished his collegiate career fourth on Le Moyne's all-time scoring list. Pete Hogan had 10 points and finished as the sixth-highest scorer in Dolphins history. Bob Burkhard scored 11 points and grabbed nine rebounds. Dave Zalewski scored eight points and Jim Fletcher added two. The Dolphins finished the 1976–77 season 15–7 and a perfect 11–0 at home. Six of Le Moyne's seven road losses, one of which was decided in overtime, were by five points or fewer. The only loss the Dolphins suffered by more than five points was a 13-point defeat at Hartwick, which was ranked no. 8 in the NCAA Division II poll at the time.

== Grey and Cooney depart (1977–1979) ==
Practices for the Dolphins' 1977–78 season opened on October 15, 1977. Le Moyne lost John Lauer and Pete Hogan, two of the top six career scorers in program history, along with Bob Burkhard, Jim Fletcher and Dave Zalewski to graduation in 1977. Al Collins, who had a strong freshman season, was lost to academic ineligibility. Senior Mike Gehm, juniors Jene Grey, Tom Fletcher, Mike Ruff and Dan Fiaschetti all returned. Head coach Tom Cooney tried to replace the size the team lost in the frontcourt with freshman recruits and signed Vinnie Hay, a 6'9" center from Clearwater Central Catholic High School in Florida. Hay was afflicted by a collapsed lung before the start of his high school senior season and then was slow to recover from a virus, which limited his playing time. Cooney also signed Jim McDermott, a 6'4" all-star, who averaged 13.8 points and six rebounds per game as a senior at Liverpool High School and Frank Cooper, a 6'4" forward, who was named to the All-Western New York team as well as the All-Catholic Buffalo team after averaging 21.7 points and 10.2 rebounds per game on 56.2% shooting a senior at DeSales Catholic High School in Lockport, New York. Gehm and Grey were elected co-captains. Also added to the team were 6'3" senior Tim DiGioia, juniors Matt Wadach (6'1") and John Niland (5'10") and sophomores Jim Maney (6'0"), Marty Creary (6'2") and Chris Biehler (6'5"). DiGioia was the leading scorer on the junior varsity team during both his freshman and sophomore years but was unable to play as a junior because of a broken ankle. Hay was placed on the junior varsity team at the end of preseason drills, leaving shooting guard Tom Fletcher as the Dolphins' tallest player at 6'5". McDermott and Cooper earned starting roles during the preseason drills. Collins got a job in a bakery, intending to enroll at Westchester Community College for the spring 1978 semester, hoping to improve his grades and return to Le Moyne. Cooney expected the size-challenged Dolphins to take advantage of their quickness in the front court and employ zone defense more frequently than in the previous season. Grey was hit by a car on campus while walking home in the dark after practice during the preseason and suffered a contusion on his leg, but he was expected to be available for the season opener.

After dropping their season opener, 90–70, at Boston College, the Dolphins turned their attention to their first-ever meeting with Syracuse, their neighbor only four miles away, who were ranked no. 12 in the AP Division I poll on December 2. The schools had a three-year agreement to meet annually. The Dolphins became the first visiting team to take a lead on the Orange's home court in the young season and had a 13–8 early advantage. However, Syracuse used their size and quickness to earn a 46–33 rebounding advantage and force 31 turnovers, and the Orange defeated Le Moyne, 90–62. Jene Grey scored 26 points on 9-for-14 shooting, grabbed nine rebounds and blocked three shots to lead the Dolphins. Mike Ruff scored five points and dished out six assists for Le Moyne. Tom Fletcher scored 11 points, and freshman Frank Cooper had 10 for the Dolphins.

The following evening, the Dolphins kept the consolation game of the Carrier Classic close for the first 10 minutes, but Rhode Island pulled away with a 12–2 run and defeated Le Moyne, 84–57. Jene Grey scored 23 points to lead the Dolphins and was named to the all-tournament team. Tom Fletcher added 19 points for Le Moyne.

Five games into the season, the Dolphins learned that starting point guard Mike Ruff, who had missed the previous three games with what was through to be a contusion on his right calf, may have suffered nerve damage in his foot and needed to see a specialist. Ruff was out of action for more than a month, returning in early January.

After starting their season with three losses to Division I opponents, the Dolphins evened their record at 3–3 with their third straight victory, all coming against Division III foes, when they won at Rochester, 80–67, on December 17. Jene Grey had a double-double for Le Moyne with 28 points on 13-for-26 shooting and 17 boards, his second straight 17-rebound performance. The Dolphins held the Yellowjackets to 35% shooting from the field while hitting 51% of their owns shots.

The Dolphins participated in the Pocono Classic, hosted by East Stroudsburg State, beating the hosts, 85–76, in overtime on January 25, 1978, before falling to Adelphi in the title game the following evening. Dolphins sophomore Jim Maney hit a layup with four seconds to play in regulation to send the East Stroudsburg State game to overtime. Jene Grey had 39 points and 36 rebounds in the two games and was named to the all-tournament team.

The Dolphins played a game that was as meaningful as a tilt with a Division III opponent can be, when they welcomed Scranton, ranked no. 1 in the Division III poll, to the Henninger Athletic Center on February 2, 1978. Junior Jene Grey had a double-double with 34 points and 17 rebounds, but he found himself in foul trouble at halftime, after having difficulty guarding Scranton's Division III All-American, Irvin Johnson, who scored 22 points in the opening stanza. Dolphins head coach Tom Cooney made a defensive switch during the intermission. He asked freshman Frank Cooper to guard Johnson in the second half, so he could keep Grey in the game. The strategy work, as Johnson was held scoreless the rest of the game. After Johnson fouled out with 3:26 to play, Scranton coach Bob Bessoir disputed the call and was charged with a technical foul. Grey hit both free throws to tie the score at 70. Seven seconds later, Grey was fouled and canned two more free throws to put Le Moyne ahead to stay. The Dolphins closed the game on an 11–4 run and won the game, 79–74. Cooper scored 10 points for Le Moyne, and another freshman, Jim McDermott, added 13. Dolphins junior Tom Fletcher had 14 points. Grey became the 12th player in program history to score 1,000 career points. The game featured a matchup of brothers. Scranton sophomore Bob Gehm scored four points, and his brother, Le Moyne senior Mike Gehm went scoreless. The Dolphins improved their record to 10–9 on the season.

The Dolphins' record reached its peak at 12–9 following a season-high five-game winning streak, but they lost four of their final five games to finish the 1977–78 season 13–13. Jene Grey ranked 21st in Division II in scoring average and seventh in rebounds per game for the season.

The Dolphins lost Mike Gehm and Tim DiGioia to graduation in 1978, but had four of their five regular starters return: seniors Jene Grey, Tom Fletcher and Mike Ruff and sophomore Jim McDermott. The previous season's fifth starter, sophomore Frank Cooper, fell out of a dormitory window during the offseason and suffered a severe back injury that would keep him out of action for the entire 1978–79 season. Other returning players were seniors Dan Fiaschetti and Matt Wadach and juniors Chris Biehler and Jim Maney. Grey and Fiaschetti were named co-captains. Sophomore Vinnie Hay was added to the team after playing junior varsity as a freshman. The Dolphins added much needed size with freshman Chris LaCombe, a 6'7" center from Peru High School, who averaged 12.5 points and 12 rebounds per game as a high school senior. Dave Hart, a 6'3" swingman, who averaged 23 points per game as a high school senior at St. Joseph's Collegiate Institute also joined the team as a freshman. Mike McDermott, the freshman brother of Jim, was a 6'2" guard, regarded as an excellent leaper and shooter, whom head coach Tom Cooney expected could start in the frontcourt.

After starting the season 1–1, the Dolphins met Alfred on December 8, 1978, in the Max Ziel Classic, hosted by Oswego State. After building a 12-point lead in the first half, Le Moyne opened the second stanza with an 18–6 run to extend their lead to 53–29. The Saxons battled back but got no closer than nine points down in the final minute, and the Dolphins claimed a 78–67 victory. Jene Grey scored a game-high 27 points to lead Le Moyne. Tom Fletcher had 14 points, eight rebounds and eight assists.

The following evening, the Dolphins dominated host Oswego State, 118–53, to win the tournament title. Jene Grey was the tournament's most valuable player, and Tom Fletcher and Mike McDermott joined Grey on the all-tournament team. The 65-point margin of victory was the largest in the history of the Max Ziel Classic.

With the Dolphins' record at 10–7 on February 11, 1979, head coach Tom Cooney informed his players that he was resigning effective at the end of the season. Cooney cited a desire to spend more time with his family and his dislike for recruiting and the travel associated with it. Cooney said he planned to move to Florida and enter the real estate business. Dolphins athletic director Tommy Niland said he hoped to select a new head coach by the end of the season and that assistant coaches Bob Kawa, who played for Niland during his last three seasons as head coach, and Mike Lee would be given first consideration. Lee was also head coach of the junior varsity team at the time.

Riding a three-game winning streak, the Dolphins entered their February 20 game at Hartwick, ranked no. 8 in the Division II poll, with a résumé that included a 12–7 record and a home win over Hartwick earlier in the season. With five games remaining on Le Moyne's schedule, this matchup represented a precious opportunity to impress NCAA tournament selectors. Trailing by eight points at intermission, the Dolphins got within four points on five separate times. A sudden Le Moyne scoring drought that lasted 5:11 and resulted in a 14–0 Hartwick run that put the game away for the Warriors, who went on to an 85–61 victory. Jene Grey scored 27 points to lead the Dolphins. Despite the loss, Le Moyne remained under consideration for a tournament bid.

The Dolphins kept their postseason hopes alive with an 82–60 home win over Buffalo on February 22, improving their record to 13–8. Five minutes after the opening tip, with the score tied at 8, Le Moyne went on a 15–0 run and led by 27 points at halftime. In the final game of the season at the Henninger Athletic Center, the Dolphins started their five seniors: Jene Grey, Tom Fletcher, Mike Ruff, Dan Fiaschetti and Matt Wadach. Grey scored a game-high 22 points in his final appearance on campus. Fletcher had 12 points, Ruff scored 11, Fiaschetti had five and Wadach scored three. Regular starter Jim McDermott came off the bench to score 11 points.

Le Moyne improved to 14–8 with a 78–72 win at Rochester on February 24. Jim McDermott scored 25 points, including two on a ferocious dunk, to lead the Dolphins, and freshman Dave Hart added 21. Final NCAA tournament selections were due to be made three days later.

The Dolphins' final home game of the 1978–79 season was played on February 26, at the Onondaga County War Memorial against Syracuse, ranked no. 6 in the AP Division I poll. After Le Moyne took an early 6–0 lead, the Orangemen surged and took control of the game, defeating the Dolphins, 92–60. Louis Orr scored 17 points and had 13 rebounds for Syracuse. Jene Grey had a game-high 28 points for Le Moyne, who fell to 14–9. During halftime, Le Moyne athletic director Tommy Niland announced that Mike Lee would take over as the Dolphins' head coach at the conclusion of the season.

The NCAA tournament selectors filled the final spots in the bracket on February 27, and the Dolphins did not receive a berth. The Dolphins lost their season finale, 72–69, at Cortland State on February 28. Jene Grey's jump shot with 20 seconds to play brought Le Moyne within two points, but the Red Dragons broke the Dolphins' press and scored a layup to put the game away. Grey had game highs of 29 points and 13 boards to finish with career totals of 1,729 points and 969 rebounds, both second in program history. Tom Cooney finished his head coaching career 82–63, and Le Moyne ended their season with a 14–10 record.

== See also ==
- History of Le Moyne Dolphins men's basketball (1969–1973)
- History of Le Moyne Dolphins men's basketball (1979–1983)
