= Laurence Ekperigin =

British-American basketball player

No. 13 – JA Vichy-Clermont Métropole Basket
- Position: Power forward / center
- League: LNB Pro B

Personal information
- Born: February 21, 1988 (age 38) Brooklyn, New York
- Listed height: 2.02 m (6 ft 8 in)
- Listed weight: 107 kg (236 lb)

Career information
- High school: Walter Panas (Cortlandt Manor, New York)
- College: Le Moyne (2006–2010)
- NBA draft: 2010: undrafted
- Playing career: 2010–present

Career history
- 2010–2011: Ulsan Mobis Phoebus
- 2011: Biella
- 2011–2012: Gran Canaria
- 2012–2013: FMC Ferentino
- 2013–2014: Poitiers 86
- 2014–2015: JSF Nanterre
- 2015–2016: Poitiers 86
- 2016–2019: Hermine Nantes
- 2019–2020: Maccabi Kiryat Motzkin
- 2020–2021: Poitiers 86
- 2021–2022: ADA Blois
- 2023-Present: JA Vichy-Clermont Métropole Basket

Career highlights
- FIBA EuroChallenge champion (2015)

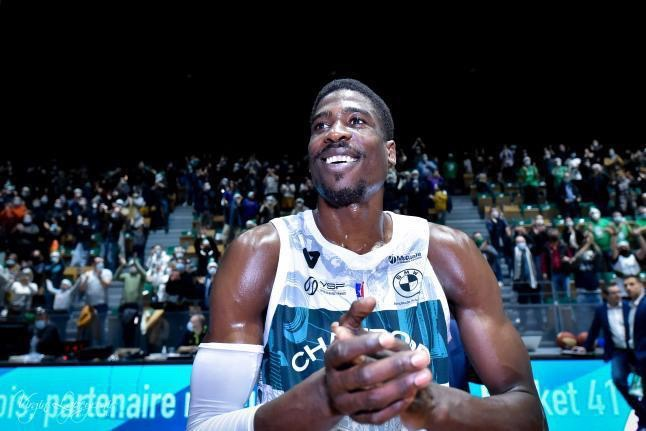

Laurence Ekperigin (born February 21, 1988) is a British-American professional basketball player who currently plays for JA Vichy-Clermont Métropole Basket in France's LNB Pro B league. He played college basketball at Le Moyne before playing professionally in South Korea, Italy, Spain, France and Israel.

== College career ==
Ekperigin played four seasons for the Le Moyne College Dolphins, where he averaged 16.8 points and 10.0 rebounds per game.

== Professional career ==
Ekperigin began his professional career with Ulsan Mobis Phoebus of the South Korean league, where he played 56 games, averaging 14.3 points and 7.3 rebounds.

In March 2011, he joined Pallacanestro Cantù of the Italian league who loaned him to Pallacanestro Biella. He would only play 3 games for Biella before joining CB Gran Canaria of the Spanish ACB league.

On July 4, 2014, he signed with JSF Nanterre for the 2014–15 season. Ekperigin won the 2015 EuroChallenge championship with Nanterre.

On July 1, 2016, he signed with Hermine Nantes of the LNB Pro B. Ekperigin played three seasons with Nantes, averaging 11 points, 6.6 rebounds and 3.5 assists per game in the 2018–19 season.

On August 26, 2019, he signed a one-year deal with Maccabi Kiryat Motzkin of the Israeli National League.

On February 28, 2023, he signed a deal for the remainder of the season with JA Vichy-Clermont Métropole Basket in the LNB Pro B league in France.

== International career ==
Ekperigin plays for the Great Britain national basketball team and was part of the team that competed in the London International Basketball Invitational. Born in the United States, Ekperigin holds a British passport through his British mother.
