= Don Savage (basketball) =

American basketball player

Personal information
- Born: April 9, 1928 Manlius, New York, U.S.
- Died: January 27, 2010 (aged 81) Basking Ridge, New Jersey, U.S.
- Listed height: 6 ft 3 in (1.91 m)
- Listed weight: 205 lb (93 kg)

Career information
- High school: Manlius (Manlius, New York)
- College: Le Moyne (1948–1951)
- NBA draft: 1951: 2nd round, 14th overall pick
- Drafted by: Syracuse Nationals
- Playing career: 1951–1956
- Position: Small forward
- Number: 9, 15

Career history
- 1951: Syracuse Nationals
- 1951–1953: Elmira Colonels
- 1953–1956: Parris Island Marines
- 1956: Syracuse Nationals

Career NBA statistics
- Points: 54 (3.2 ppg)
- Rebounds: 31 (1.8 rpg)
- Assists: 14 (0.8 apg)
- Stats at NBA.com
- Stats at Basketball Reference

Donald Joseph Savage (April 9, 1928 - January 27, 2010) was an American professional basketball player. Savage was selected in the second round (14th overall) in the 1951 NBA draft by the Syracuse Nationals after a collegiate career at Le Moyne. Besides two different seasons with the Nationals, Savage also played for the Elmira Colonels of the American Basketball League.

== Career statistics ==
Legend
GP	Games played	GS	Games started	MPG	Minutes per game
FG%	Field goal percentage	3P%	3-point field goal percentage	FT%	Free throw percentage
RPG	Rebounds per game	APG	Assists per game	SPG	Steals per game
BPG	Blocks per game	PPG	Points per game	**Bold**	Career high

=== NBA ===
==== Regular season ====
Year	Team	GP	MPG	FG%	FT%	RPG	APG	PPG
1951–52	Syracuse	**12**	9.8	.209	.643	**2.0**	**1.0**	3.0
1956–57	Syracuse	5	**11.0**	**.316**	**.857**	1.4	.4	**3.6**
Career		17	10.2	.242	.686	1.8	.8	3.2
