= Macy's =

American department store chain

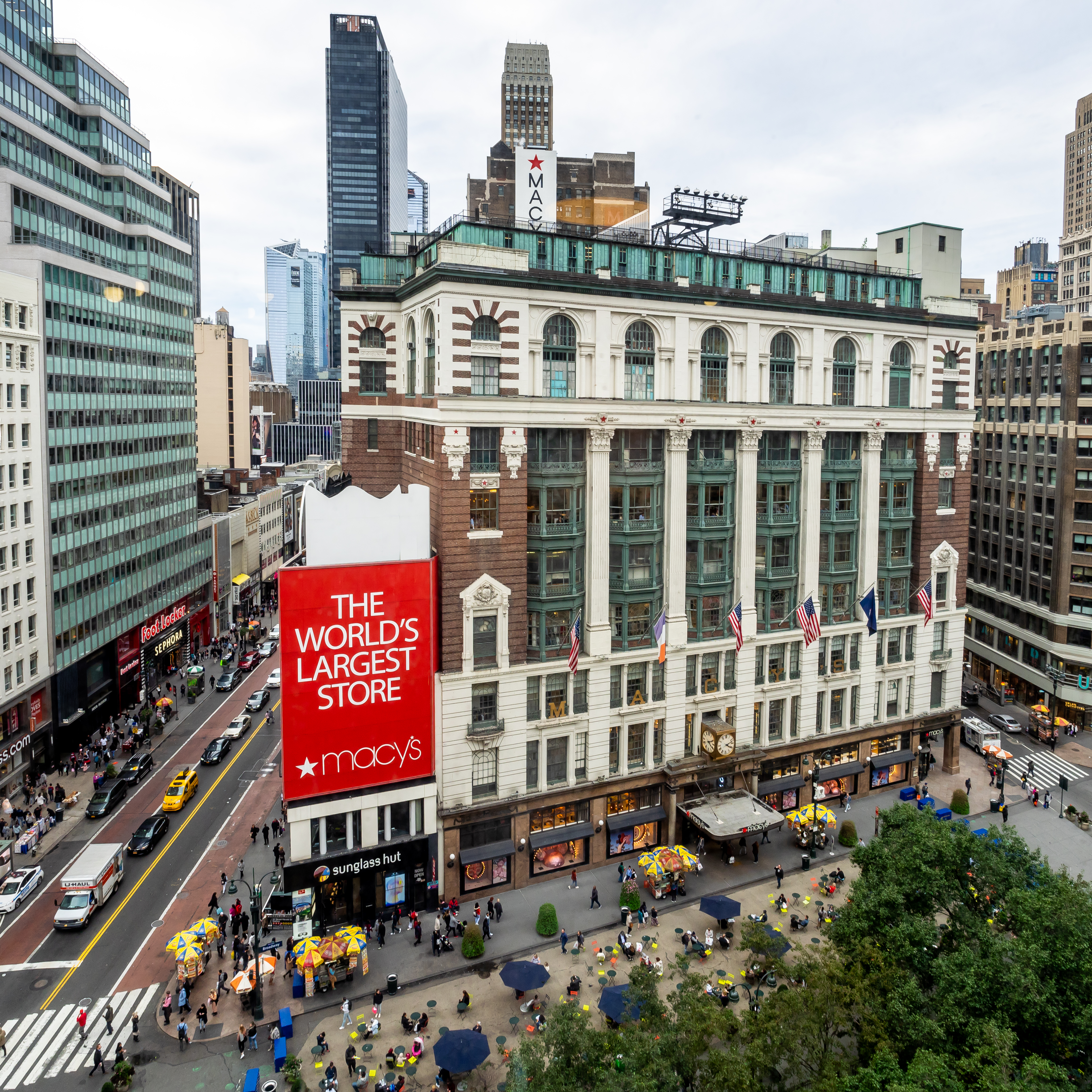
- Exterior of the Macy's Herald Square flagship store in Manhattan (2018)
- Trade name: Macy's
- Formerly: R. H. Macy & Co.
- Type: Subsidiary
- Industry: Retail
- Genre: Department stores
- Founded: October 28, 1858; 168 years ago in New York City, United States
- Founder: Rowland Hussey Macy
- Headquarters: Macy's Herald Square, 151 West 34th Street, New York City, United States
- Number of locations: 450 (Note: Store count includes 425 full-line Macy's, 20 small-format Macy's, and 5 standalone Macy's Backstage locations.) (2025)
- Areas served: United States; Puerto Rico; Guam
- Key people: Tony Spring (chairman and CEO)
- Products: Clothing; footwear; accessories; handbags; jewelry; cosmetics; fragrances; bedding; bath; furniture; decor; housewares; appliances; electronics; toys; giftware
- Parent: Macy's, Inc. (1994–present)
- Website: macys.com

Macy's IP Holdings, LLC, doing business as Macy's, is an American department store chain founded in 1858 by Rowland Hussey Macy. The first store was located in Manhattan on Sixth Avenue between 13th and 14th Streets, south of opened in 1902. It expanded beyond the New York metropolitan area by acquisitions and conversions of regional department stores, facilitated by the purchase of Macy's by Federated Department Stores in 1994. It achieved a national footprint with the acquisition of the May Department Stores Company by Federated in 2005, which resulted in the conversion of its department stores to Macy's in 2006 and the renaming of Federated to Macy's, Inc. in 2007. Macy's is also a sister brand to the upmarket Bloomingdale's department store chain and Bluemercury beauty store chain.

Macy's is the largest department store company by retail sales in the United States, with 94,000 employees and an annual revenue of $25.3 billion as of 2023. It operates 450 locations in the country and its territories Puerto Rico and Guam as of 2025. Macy's Herald Square is one of the largest department stores in the world, spanning approximately 1.1 million square feet (100,000 m^{2}) of selling space and covering nearly an entire New York City block; its value is estimated at $3 billion. Macy's has conducted the annual Macy's Thanksgiving Day Parade in New York City since 1924 and has sponsored the city's annual Macy's 4th of July Fireworks since 1976.

== 19th-century history ==
Rowland Hussey Macy opened four retail dry goods stores between 1843 and 1855. One of them was the original Macy's store in downtown Haverhill, Massachusetts; it opened in 1851 to serve the mill industry employees of the area. They all failed, but he learned from his mistakes. Macy moved to New York City in 1858, to establish a new store named "R. H. Macy & Co." on Sixth Avenue between 13th and 14th Streets. The location was far north of where other dry goods stores were at the time. On the company's first day of business on October 28, 1858, sales totaled $11.08, equal to $412.3 today. The branding emblem at the onset of the 1858 store was a rooster. The red star did not appear to replace it until 1862.

As the business grew, Macy's expanded into neighboring buildings, opening more and more departments. The store used publicity devices such as a store Santa Claus, themed exhibits, and illuminated window displays to draw in customers. It also offered a money-back guarantee, although it accepted only cash into the 1950s. The store also produced its in-house made-to-measure clothing for both men and women, assembled in an on-site factory.

In 1875, Macy took on two partners, Robert M. Valentine (1850–1879), a nephew; and Abiel T. La Forge (1842–1878) of Wisconsin, who was the husband of a cousin. Macy died in 1877 from inflammatory kidney disease (then known as Bright's disease). La Forge died the following year, and Valentine died in 1879. Ownership of the company remained in the Macy family until 1895, when the Straus brothers, Isidor and Nathan, acquired the company (now called "R. H. Macy & Co."). Isidor Straus and his brother Nathan Straus had previously held a license to sell china and other goods in the Macy's store.

== 20th-century history ==
=== Construction of Macy's Herald Square ===
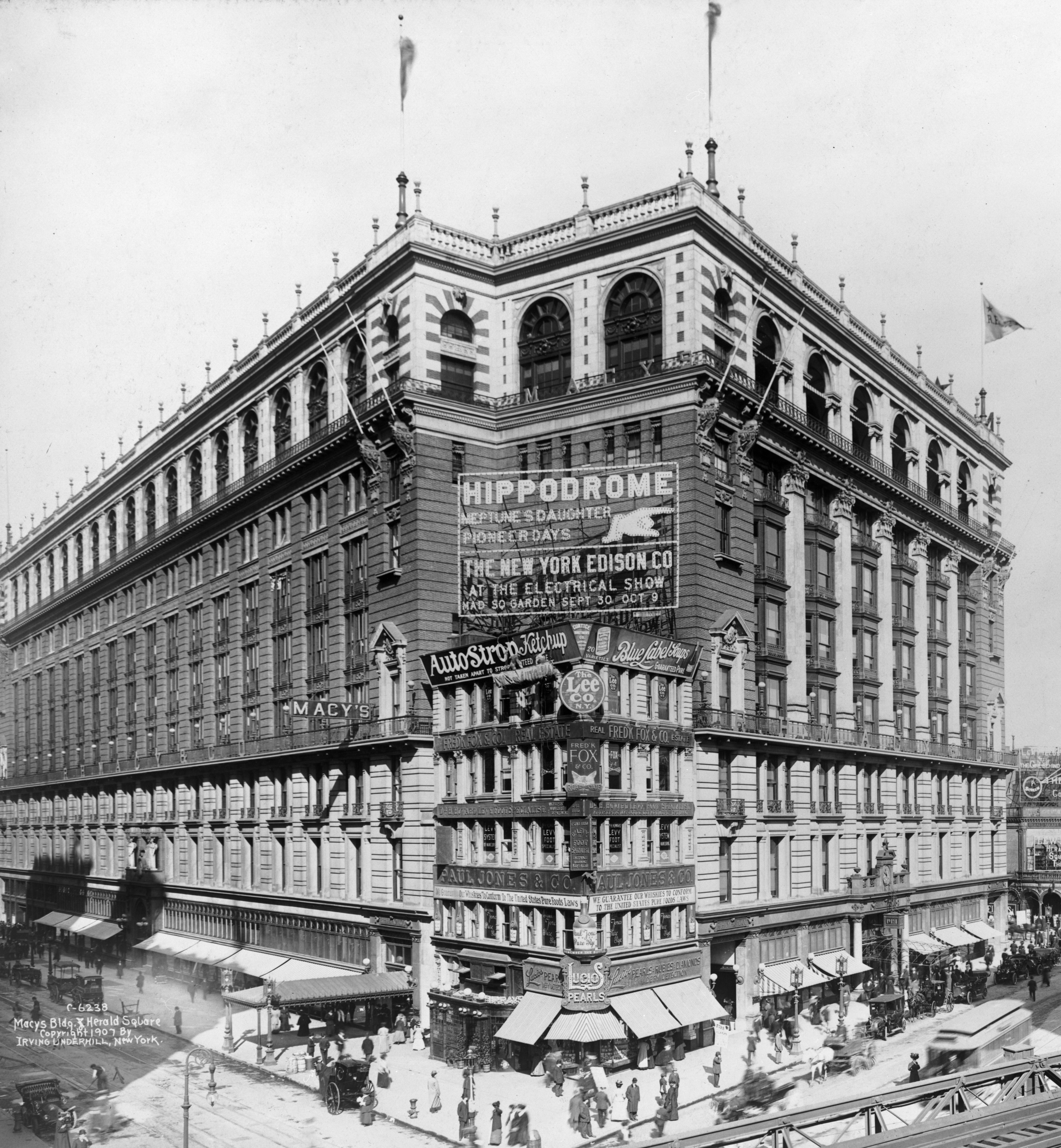
Macy's Herald Square (1907)

In 1902, the flagship store moved uptown to Herald Square at 34th Street and Broadway, so far north of the other main dry goods emporia that it had to offer a steam wagonette to transport customers from 14th Street to 34th Street. Although the Herald Square store initially consisted of just one building, it expanded through new construction, eventually occupying almost the entire block bounded by Seventh Avenue on the west, Broadway on the east, 34th Street on the south and 35th Street on the north, with the exception of a small pre-existing building on the corner of 35th Street and Seventh Avenue and another on the corner of 34th Street and Broadway. This latter 5-story building was purchased by Robert H. Smith in 1900 for $375,000 (equivalent to $14.5 million in 2025) with the idea of getting in the way of Macy's becoming the largest store in the world: it is largely supposed that Smith, who was a neighbor of the Macy's store on 14th Street, was acting on behalf of Siegel-Cooper, which had built what they thought was the world's largest store on Sixth Avenue in 1896. Macy's ignored the tactic, and simply built around the building, which now carries Macy's "shopping bag" sign by lease arrangement. In 1912, Isidor Straus died in the sinking of the Titanic at the age of 67 with his wife, Ida.

The original Broadway store was designed by architects De Lemos & Cordes, was built in 1901–1902 by the Fuller Company and has a Palladian facade, but has been updated in many details. There were further additions to the west in 1924 and 1928, and the Seventh Avenue building in 1931, all designed by architect Robert D. Kohn, the newer buildings were increasingly Art Deco in style. In 2012, Macy's began the first full renovation of the iconic Herald Square flagship store at a reported cost of $400 million. Studio V Architecture, a New York-based firm, was the overall Master Plan architect of the project. Studio V's design raised controversy over the nature of contemporary design and authentic restoration.

The building was listed on the National Register of Historic Places in 1978 and designated a National Historic Landmark in the same year.

=== National expansion ===
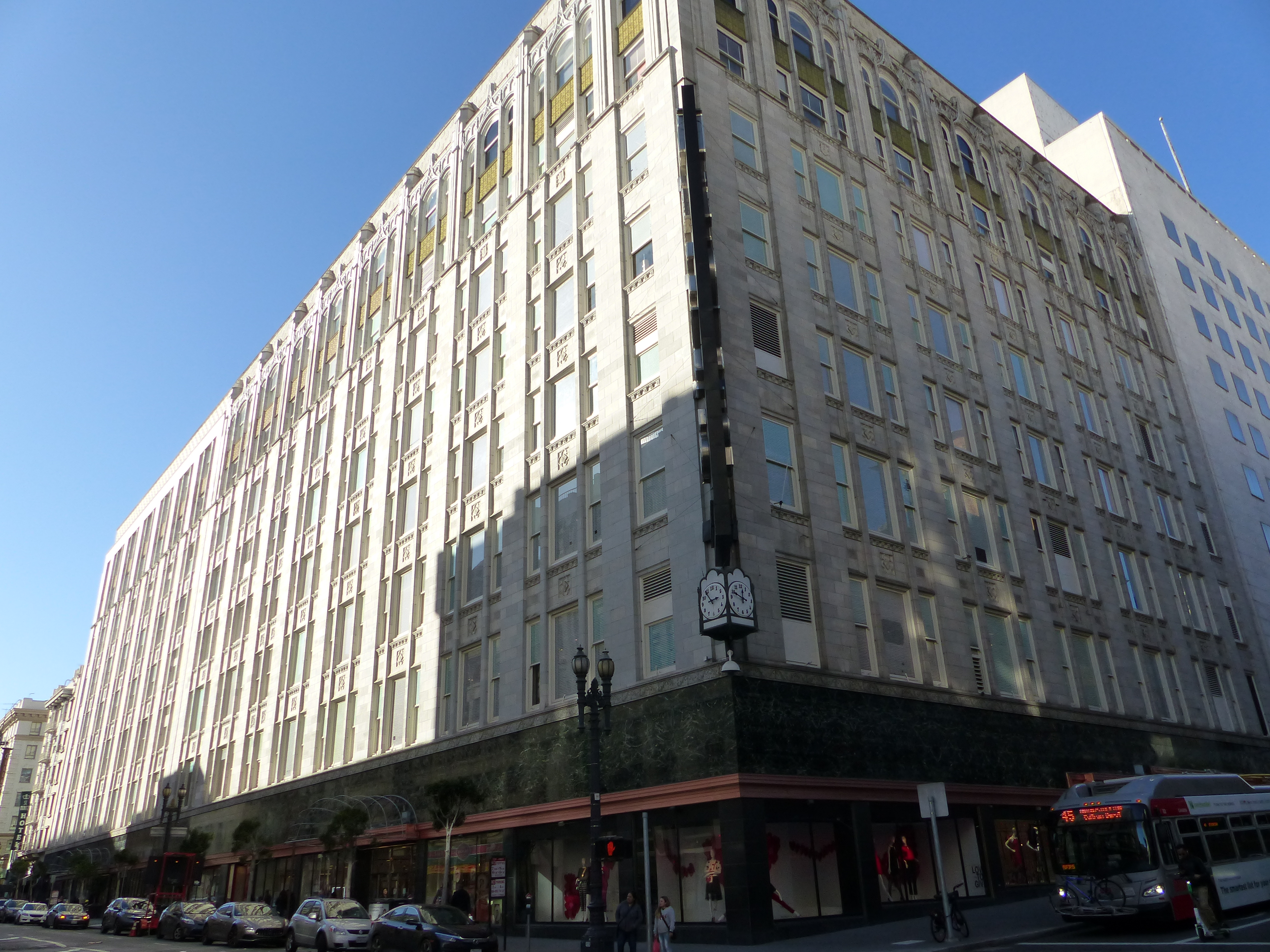
The former O'Connor, Moffat & Co. flagship store in San Francisco, now the Macy's regional flagship store

Macy's opened their first branch store outside their 34th Street location in the Parkchester development in The Bronx, on October 13, 1941.

The company also acquired local department store chains across the country, including Lasalle & Koch (Toledo, 1923), Davison-Paxon-Stokes (Atlanta, 1929), L. Bamberger & Co. (Newark, 1929), O'Connor Moffat & Company (San Francisco, 1945) and John Taylor Dry Goods Co. (Kansas City, 1947). O'Connor Moffat was renamed Macy's San Francisco in 1947, later becoming Macy's California, and John Taylor was renamed Macy's Missouri–Kansas in 1949. Stores in Toledo retained the Lasalle's name until 1981, joining the Missouri–Kansas stores to become Macy's Midwest. The Toledo stores were sold to Elder-Beerman in 1986.

In 1965, Macy's opened a large branch store on Queens Boulevard in Elmhurst, in the New York City borough of Queens. The owner of a small house on the corner refused to sell his land. As a result, a round department store was constructed on 90 percent of the lot. The building has since been converted to the Queens Place mall, though Macy's Furniture Gallery remains in a portion as a tenant.

Macy's New York began opening stores outside of its historic New York City–Long Island trade area in 1983 with a location at Aventura Mall in Aventura, Florida (a suburb of Miami), followed by several locations in Plantation, Florida (now relocated from the Fashion Mall to the Broward Mall since the Burdines acquisition), Houston, New Orleans, and Dallas. Davison's in Atlanta was renamed Macy's Atlanta in early 1985 with the consolidation of an early incarnation of Macy's Midwest (former Taylor and Lasalle's stores in Kansas City and Toledo, respectively), but late in 1985, Macy's sold the former Midwest locations. Bamberger's, which had aggressively expanded throughout New Jersey, into the Philadelphia metropolitan area in the 1960s and 1970s as well as into Nanuet, New York (southern Rockland County), and into the Baltimore metropolitan area in the early 1980s, was renamed Macy's New Jersey in 1986.

=== 1992 bankruptcy ===
In 1986 Edward Finkelstein, Chairman & CEO of R. H. Macy & Company, Inc., led a leveraged buy-out of the company and subsequently engaged in a takeover battle for Federated Department Stores, Inc., in 1988 that he lost to Canada's Campeau Corporation. As part of its settlement with Campeau, Macy's purchased Federated's California-based, fashion-oriented Bullock's and its high-end Bullocks Wilshire and I. Magnin divisions. It followed with a reorganization of its divisions into Macy's Northeast (former Macy's New York and Macy's New Jersey), Macy's South/Bullock's (Macy's Atlanta stores plus Macy's New York's operations in Texas, Florida and Louisiana), and Macy's California, the latter including a semi-autonomous I. Magnin/Bullocks Wilshire organization. The Bullocks Wilshire stores were renamed I. Magnin in 1989. Subsequently, R. H. Macy & Co., Inc., filed for Chapter 11 bankruptcy protection on January 27, 1992, after which point its banks brought in a new management team, which shut several underperforming stores, jettisoned two-thirds of the luxury I. Magnin chain, and reduced Macy's to two divisions, Macy's East and Macy's West.

Macy's East, New York City was a division of Macy's, Inc. It is the operating successor to the original R.H. Macy & Company, Inc. and operates the Macy's department stores in the northeast U.S. and Puerto Rico. Over the years it has been known as Macy's New York and Macy's Northeast. On February 1, 2006, Macy's East assumed operating control over the Filene's, Strawbridge's, many of the Kaufmann's stores in upstate New York and the Hecht's stores in Pennsylvania, Maryland, D.C. and northern Virginia. These locations assumed the Macy's moniker officially on September 9, 2006. In 2008 Macy's East took over the small Macy's North division.

In May 1993, Macy's announced the planned fall 1994 launch of TV Macy's, the retailer's own home shopping channel, in conjunction with Don Hewitt, Thomas Leahy and Cablevision.

=== 1994 acquisition by Federated ===
R. H. Macy & Co. merged with Federated Department Stores in December 1994. Following the merger, the reorganized Macy's moved its headquarters to Cincinnati, Ohio. Federated promptly shut down the remainder of the I. Magnin chain, converting several to Macy's or Bullock's and selling four in Carmel, Beverly Hills, San Diego and Phoenix to Saks Fifth Avenue. Federated also merged its Abraham & Straus/Jordan Marsh division with the new "Macy's East" organization based in New York, renaming the Abraham & Straus stores in metropolitan New York with the Macy's nameplate in 1995, and then erasing the Jordan Marsh moniker in New England in early 1996.

Federated followed that by leading a bid in mid-1995 to acquire the bankrupt Woodward & Lothrop/John Wanamaker organization in the mid-Atlantic region, a bid it lost to a rival group led by long-time rival and future acquisition target The May Department Stores Company. Instead Federated soon agreed to purchase Broadway Stores, Inc. (owner of The Broadway, Emporium and Weinstock's stores in California, Arizona, Nevada and New Mexico), from its majority shareholder, Sam Zell, thereby gaining a leading position in Southern California and a dominant one in the Northern California marketplace. In early 1996 Federated dissolved Broadway Stores, incorporating the majority of its locations into Macy's West, rebadging them as Macy's and using the opportunity to retire the Bullock's name. Several of the redundant Broadway locations were used to establish Bloomingdale's on the West Coast, while many others were sold to Sears.

== 21st-century history ==
In 2000 Macy's opened its doors in Puerto Rico, the chain's first location in a U.S. territory. It is located in the Plaza Las Américas mall in San Juan.

In 2001 Federated dissolved its Stern's division in the New York metropolitan area, with the bulk of the stores being absorbed into Macy's East. Additionally, in July 2001, it acquired the Liberty House chain with department and specialty stores in Hawaii and Guam, consolidating it with Macy's West.

In early 2003 Federated closed the majority of its historic Davison's franchise in Atlanta (operating as Macy's since 1985), rebranding its other Atlanta division Rich's with the unwieldy name, Rich's–Macy's. The downtown location – formerly the Davison's flagship store at 180 Peachtree Street – was shuttered at this time as well. The original Macy's Lenox Square and Perimeter Mall locations were extensively remodeled and opened in October 2003 as the first Bloomingdale's stores in Atlanta. The company rapidly followed suit in May 2003 with similar rebranding announcements for its other nameplates, Burdines in Florida, Goldsmith's in Memphis, Lazarus in the lower Midwest, and The Bon Marché in the Pacific Northwest.

On March 6, 2005, the Bon-Macy's, Burdines-Macy's, Goldsmith's-Macy's, Lazarus-Macy's, and Rich's–Macy's stores were renamed as simply "Macy's", the first two as the new Macy's West and Macy's Florida divisions respectively and the later three as part of the Macy's Central division. As of July 2005, Macy's had 424 stores throughout the U.S.

=== 2005 acquisition of May by Federated ===
Previous Macy's logo, in use from 2004 until 2019

On February 28, 2005, Federated agreed to terms of a deal to acquire The May Department Stores Company for $11 billion (equivalent to $18.1 billion in 2025) in stock, creating a department store chain with $30 billion (equivalent to $49.5 billion in 2025) in annual sales and more than 1,000 stores.

On July 28, 2005, Federated announced, based on the success of converting its own regional brands to the Macy's name, its plans to similarly convert 330 regional department stores owned by the May Company to the Macy's nameplate. This included Kaufmann's, Famous-Barr, Filene's, Foley's, Hecht's, The Jones Store, L. S. Ayres, Meier & Frank, Robinsons-May, and Strawbridge & Clothier chains, pending approval of the merger by federal regulators. Though initially spared from the rebrandings announced in July, Marshall Field's was added to the lot on September 20, 2005.

The rebranding of the May stores was disliked in Chicago and elsewhere because the stores were regarded as beloved local institutions. The renaming of Filene's, Marshall Field's, and Kaufmann's, which were well known for their downtown flagship stores and local traditions provoked the most outrage. For example, Kaufmann's operated the Kaufmann's Celebrate the Season Parade which was traditionally broadcast live throughout the Commonwealth of Pennsylvania on television. Many customers publicly vowed to never again shop at the renamed May stores and to switch to competitors. Prominent film critic Roger Ebert voiced the grief of many Chicagoans at the loss of Field's when he wrote in his column on September 21, 2005:

I thought the day would never come. I am looking at my Field's charge card, which I have cut up into tiny pieces. They look like little tears the color of money.

On January 12, 2006, Federated announced its plans to divest May Company's Lord & Taylor division. On June 22, 2006, Macy's announced that NRDC Equity Partners, LLC would purchase Lord & Taylor for US$1.2 billion (equivalent to $1.92 billion in 2025), and completed the sale in October 2006.

By September 9, 2006, after renaming the former May Company stores, Macy's operated approximately 850 stores in the United States. To promote its largest and most recent expansion, Macy's used a version of the Martha and the Vandellas hit song, "Dancing in the Street", in its advertising. Also, the company took props from its annual Thanksgiving Day parade to various re-labeled stores throughout the nation, in what the company marketed as its "Parade on Parade".

In October 2006, Federated Department Stores entered into an agreement with Zoom Systems to test more than 100 stores within retail giant Macy's. Terry Lundgren, CEO of Federated, raved about the ability to provide consumers with a convenient means to purchase iPods and other consumer electronics, saying "This is exciting because it brings most-wanted merchandise into stores in a unique new way.... How cool is that?" Today, Macy's has converted its entire Electronics section in every store to (over 400) eSpot ZoomShops.

Macy's significantly increased its use of television advertising and product placement in 2006 and 2007, using branding spots that featured the new Macy's star logo. Macy's television commercials are produced primarily by New York Production Services, a New York-based commercial and independent film production company. During two episodes of the popular ABC television series Desperate Housewives ("I Remember That" and "Now You Know"), a Macy's location in the fictional city of Fairview was featured, rare instances of product placement promoting a department store chain in a scripted series. Nearly two years prior to the first episode, one of the first national commercials for Macy's had aired during Desperate Housewives, shortly after the conversions of Rich's, Lazarus, Goldsmith's, The Bon Marché and Burdines.

On February 27, 2007, Federated Department Stores announced plans to change its corporate name to Macy's Group, Inc. By March 28, the company further announced plans to convert its stock ticker symbol from "FD" to "M", and revised its name change to Macy's, Inc. The change in corporate names was approved by shareholders on May 18, 2007, and took effect on June 1, 2007. The company continues to operate stores under the Macy's and Bloomingdale's nameplates.

In March 2009, Macy's opened a one-level, 120,000-square-foot (11,000 m^{2}) concept store in Gilbert, Arizona, a Phoenix suburb, that was designed to better fit open air lifestyle malls. Additional stores with the new format have opened in Fairview, Texas; Lee's Summit, Missouri; and Nampa, Idaho. The stores are designed to be compact and meet current demands for more convenient shopping similar to Kohl's and newer J. C. Penney stores. Lifestyle stores feature Starbucks Coffee Cafés with wireless web and fitting rooms designed to feel like lounges with sofas and plasma TVs. Ceilings in the center areas are higher to be reminiscent of older department stores. The format was the culmination of 18 months of research to create stores for the "My Macy's" initiative that allows stores to be merchandised differently in markets across the country to meet local demands.

=== 2010s ===
On October 28, 2014 Macy's, Inc. announced an extension of the lease-operation agreement with Al Tayer Group LLC that would bring the first Macy's store overseas to Abu Dhabi, anchoring a new mall with its corporate-sister Bloomingdale's, which will open its second overseas store (the first was located at the Dubai Mall); both are slated to open in 2018. Macy's was the 15th-largest retailer in the United States for 2014 by revenue.

In January 2015, it was announced that Macy's would close 14 stores nationwide and shift 830 workers from Macy's and Bloomingdale's stores. Unrelated to the store closings, on July 13, 2015, Macy's announced it had sold the former flagship store of Kaufmann's in Downtown Pittsburgh for redevelopment, closing the location after 128 years.

In May 2015, Macy's joined the new American Express-backed Plenti rewards card, which it shares with AT&T Mobility, Direct Energy, Enterprise Rent-A-Car, ExxonMobil, Hulu, Nationwide Insurance, and Rite Aid.

On September 9, 2015, Macy's announced it would close 35 to 40 under-performing stores by early 2016. The retailer's struggles continued into the holiday season in 2015. The company announced that it experienced same store sales declines of 5.2% in November and December 2015 – typically busy months. In January 2016, Macy's announced that it will layoff up to 4,800 employees. The company said that these closings would experience cost savings of $400 million. As of January 2016, Macy's had 770 stores in total.

On August 11, 2016, Macy's announced that it would close 100 stores in early 2017, expecting to save $550 million a year and cut more than 10,000 jobs. Macy's claimed it would instead invest $250 million in digital business and growth strategies for the remaining stores. By January 2018, Macy's had revealed the locations of 81 of the 100 store closures.

In September 2016, Macy's announced that it would be opening an Apple Store in its flagship location, making it the first department store to host an Apple store. The announcement came after six straight quarters of sales drops and significant store closings. In early January 2017, the value of Macy's shares fell 14%, its biggest drop in seven months. In February 2017, the Hudson's Bay Company made an overture to Macy's for a potential takeover of the struggling department store.

Macy's acquired experiential concept Story in May 2018 and made a minority investment in b8ta, a retail as a service concept, in June 2018.

By February 2019, Macy's Inc. was operating 867 stores, including Macy's, Backstage, Bloomingdale's, Bloomingdale's Outlets, Bluemercury, and STORY; 641 of the 867 stores were Macy's, including 584 that are full line and 57 that are home, furniture, clearance and specialty stores.

In November 2018, Macy's announced they would test smaller "neighborhood" stores to reduce costs and promote innovation within the customer experience realm. As of 2018, Macy's ranked 120 on the Fortune 500 list of the largest United States corporations by revenue. Former CEO Jeff Gennette also launched an overhaul of Macy's stores called the Growth150 strategic plan.

In the second quarter of 2019, Macy's shares fell more than 13 percent. On August 14, shares hit $15.82, which was their lowest since February 2010.

=== 2020s ===
After conducting two years of research, Macy's announced in 2019 that it intended to ban the sale of fur products at its stores by the end of the 2020 fiscal year. The news follows the state of California's ban on the manufacturing and sale of such items. In 2020, Macy's closed its Cincinnati headquarters (at 7 west 7th Street, now converted to luxury apartments), consolidating headquarters operations in New York City. JANA Partners, an activist investment firm, disclosed a large stake in Macy's in 2021, and sent a letter to the board recommending spinning off the company's online business. In response, Macy's hired AlixPartners to review their business structure. By the end of 2021, JANA had reduced their holding in Macy's by 84%, or about 1.5% of the company. In August 2021, Macy's announced they were partnering with Toys "R" Us to open toy shops in Macy's stores, starting in 2022. In November 2021, Macy's announced they were starting a free education program and boosting its corporation base salary to $15 per hour.

In February 2023, Macy's said they would no longer sell leather goods made of exotic skins, such as reptiles or ostriches. On the morning of December 4, 2023, a stabbing occurred at Macy's Flagship store in Philadelphia, killing 27-year-old security guard Eric Harrison.

In January 2024, Macy's rejected a $5 billion takeover from Arkhouse Management and Brigade Capital Management to acquire all of the outstanding shares of the company. In January 2024, Sycamore Partners requested to purchase the struggling Macy's company. In February 2024, Macy's announced that up to 150 underperforming stores would close by the end of 2026, with 50 stores closing by the end of 2024. That number was increased to 65 by December. Macy's stated that the closing stores only represented 10% of its total sales. The company plans to focus on opening 45 Bloomingdale's and 30 Bluemercury stores while remodeling 30 additional Bluemercury stores.

In January 2025, 66 stores, including landmark locations in Philadelphia and Brooklyn, were set to close.

In January 2026, Macy's announced they were closing 14 locations in the first quarter, as part of their February 2024 consolidation plan.

== Retail formats ==
Macy's utilizes a "mall-within-a-mall" format; in properties that have multiple Macy's locations, the second stores are often arranged in the following department configurations:

  - Women and Children
  - Furniture Clearance
  - Furniture Gallery
  - Furniture and Kids'
  - Furniture and Men's
  - Furniture, Home, Kids', and Men's
  - Furniture, Home, and Men's
  - Furniture, Kids', and Men's
  - Home, Kids' and Men's
  - Home, Kids', and Women's
  - Home and Men's
  - Kids' and Men's
  - Men's

=== Macy's Backstage ===
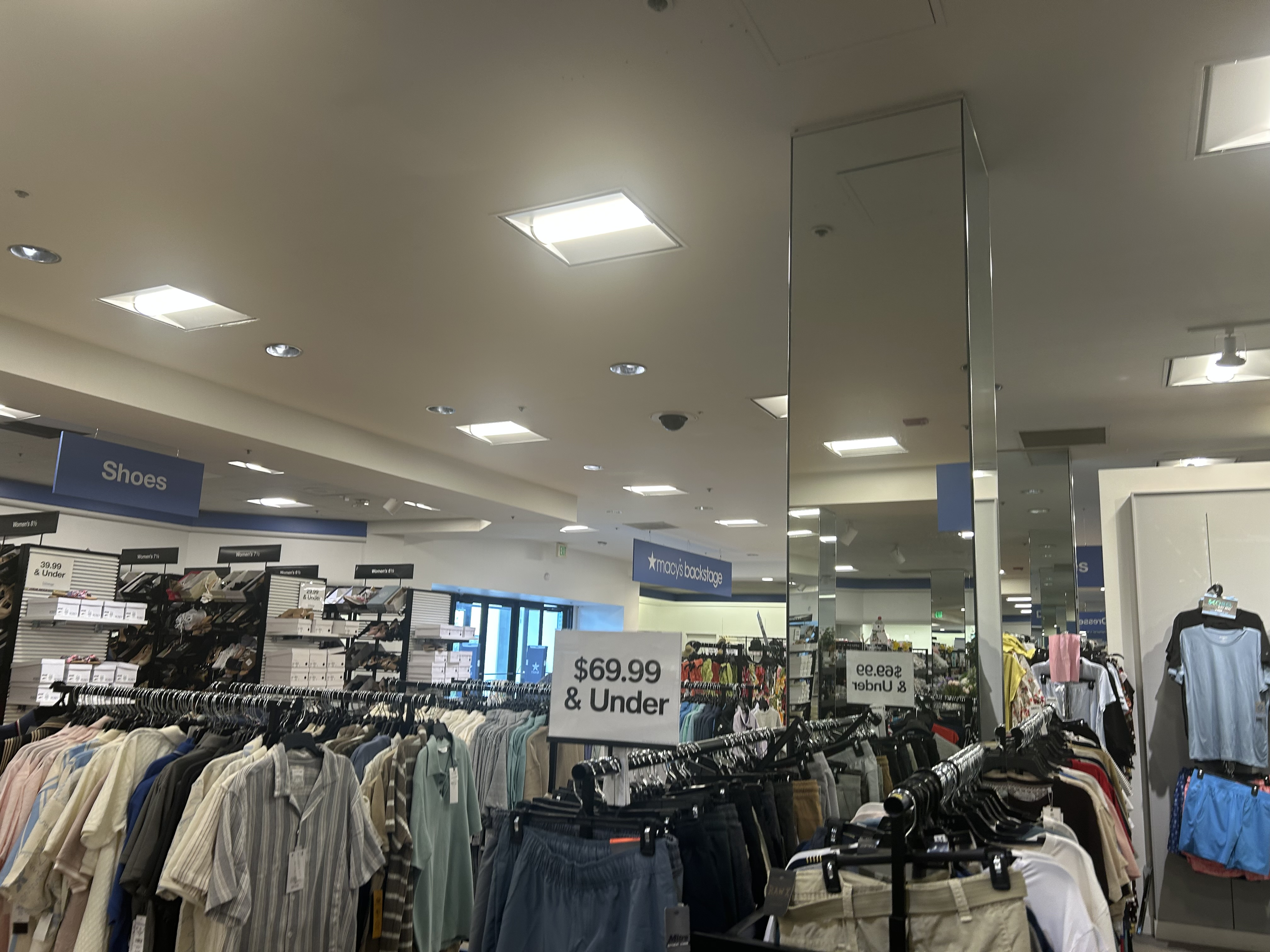
Macy's Backstage at Towson Town Center (June 2026)

Macy's Backstage is often featured in this "mall-within-a mall" format; it is a chain of off-price stores-within-stores located inside 319 full-line Macy's department stores, with nine freestanding locations. Some brands sold in Macy's Backstage stores are not (or are no longer) sold by full-line Macy's stores, such as Authentic Brands Group's Izod and Arrow brands, and Ralph Lauren Corporation's Chaps brand.

== Private brands ==
Macy's sells a variety of private label brands. In 2022, private brands made up 16% of the company's annual sales.

=== List ===
- Alfani
- And Now This
- Bar III
- The Cellar
- Charter Club
- Club Room
- Epic Threads
- Family PJs
- First Impressions
- Giani Bernini
- Hotel Collection
- Holiday Lane
- Ideology
- I.N.C.
- Jenni
- JM Collection
- Karen Scott
- Mode of One
- Oake
- On 34th
- Style & Co.
- Sun + Stone
- Tools of the Trade

== Flagship stores ==
As of March 2025, Macy's operates three flagship stores. Many of these locations were converted from regional department stores that were acquired by Federated.

List of Macy's flagship stores
State	City	Name	Size	Year opened	Year closed	Notes
California	San Francisco	Macy's Union Square	700,000 square feet (65,000 m^{2})	1947		Originally O'Connor, Moffat & Co., later I. Magnin and Liberty House
Georgia	Atlanta		338,000 square feet (31,400 m^{2})	1927	2003	Converted from Davison's
Illinois	Chicago	Macy's State Street	300,000 square feet (28,000 m^{2})	1876	—N/a	Converted from Marshall Field's
Minnesota	Minneapolis			1902	2016	Converted from Dayton's
Minnesota	Saint Paul		362,000 square feet (33,600 m^{2})	1963	2013	Converted from Dayton's
New York	New York City	Macy's Herald Square	1.25 million square feet (116,000 m^{2})	1902	—N/a	
Oregon	Portland	Macy's Downtown Portland	208,520 square feet (19,372 m^{2})	1909	2017	Converted from Meier & Frank
Pennsylvania	Philadelphia	Macy's Center City	1,367,838 square feet (127,076.3 m^{2}) (Note: At its peak; now the store occupies only three floors of the Wanamaker Building.)	1861	2025	Converted from Wanamaker's
Washington	Seattle		864,000 square feet (80,300 m^{2})	1929	2020	Converted from The Bon Marché

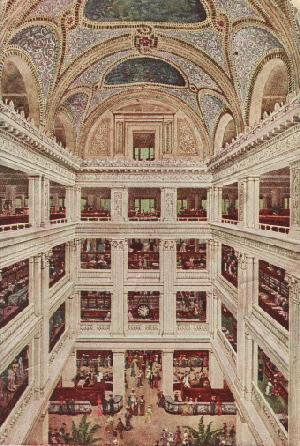
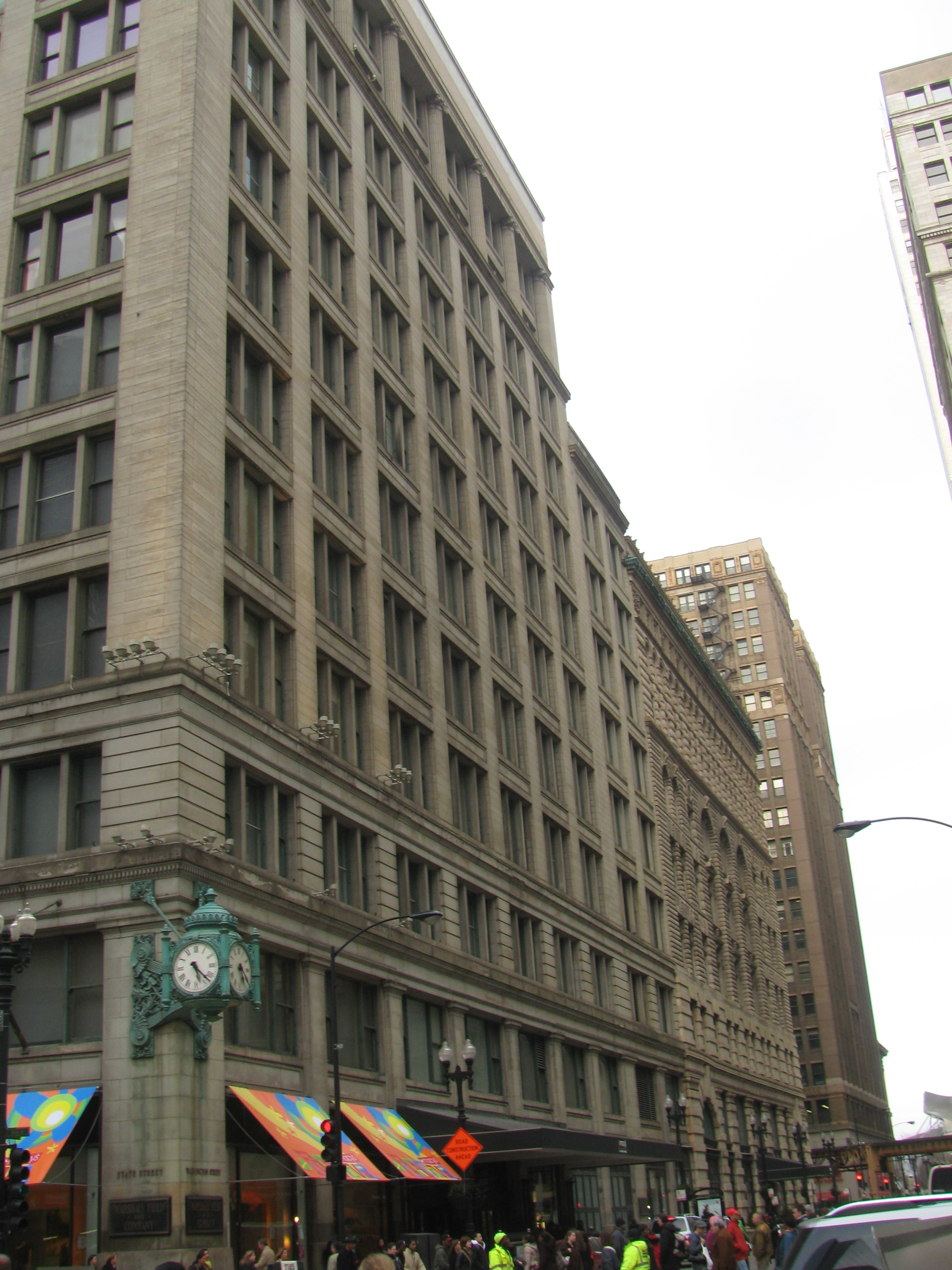
An atrium includes a 5-story balconied Louis Comfort Tiffany, (1848–1933), (later Tiffany & Co. studios) mosaic-capped vaulted ceiling (left, 1910) in the southwest corner of the Macy's State Street store housed in the historic Marshall Field's Building in Chicago, Illinois (right).

== Criticism and controversy ==
Macy's has had a long history with issues concerning discriminatory practices. In July 2003, then–New York State Attorney General Eliot Spitzer launched an investigation of the private policing system Macy's has used to deal with suspected shoplifters. The investigation was prompted by a civil rights lawsuit and an article in The New York Times, which reported on many of Macy's tactics, including private jails and interrogations. Spitzer's investigation found many of Macy's actions, from ethnic profiling to handcuffing detainees, to be unlawful. In 2005, Macy's settled the civil rights complaint for $600,000 (equivalent to $989,095 in 2025), claiming to have put the illegal tactics to an end while maintaining the security system itself.

On June 6, 2006, Macy's downtown Boston store (formerly the Jordan Marsh flagship) removed two mannequins and the Web address of the AIDS Action Committee from a window display promoting Boston's annual gay pride celebration. The removal was apparently in response to pressure from MassResistance, a local group opposed to same-sex marriage, whose members complained the mannequins were "homosexual". The removal of the mannequins was controversial and Boston mayor Thomas Menino was quoted as saying:

I'm very surprised that Macy's would bend to that type of pressure. Macy's was celebrating a part of our community, gay pride, and they should be proud of the gay community, and I'm proud of the gay community and gay pride.

Macy's responded by publishing an apology by the Macy's East chairman, Ron Klein, in In Newsweekly, a Boston-area weekly with a large gay readership. Klein's description of the incident as "an internal breakdown in communication", further stated it was regrettable some would doubt Macy's commitment to diversity as a result. The Web address was later restored – the mannequins, however, never made a reappearance.

In 2014, Macy's paid $650,000 to settle claims that it racially profiled minority customers at its stores after initially refusing to admit any blame and instead placing it on the NYPD despite the profiling occurring at their store.

In 2017, former Macy's employees that alleged being wrongfully terminated by Macy's sued Macy's alleging that they were told to not sell products to customers appearing to be of Asian descent at its flagship Herald Square store.

In 2018, Macy's paid $75,000 to settle a disability discrimination lawsuit brought by the US Equal Employment Opportunity Commission for allegedly firing an asthmatic employee rather than excusing a one day, health-related absence.

In 2024, the company announced a delay to their third quarter earnings release and conference call citing an employee's scheme to hide approximately $132–155mm of expenses, for no supposed reason.

== Gallery ==
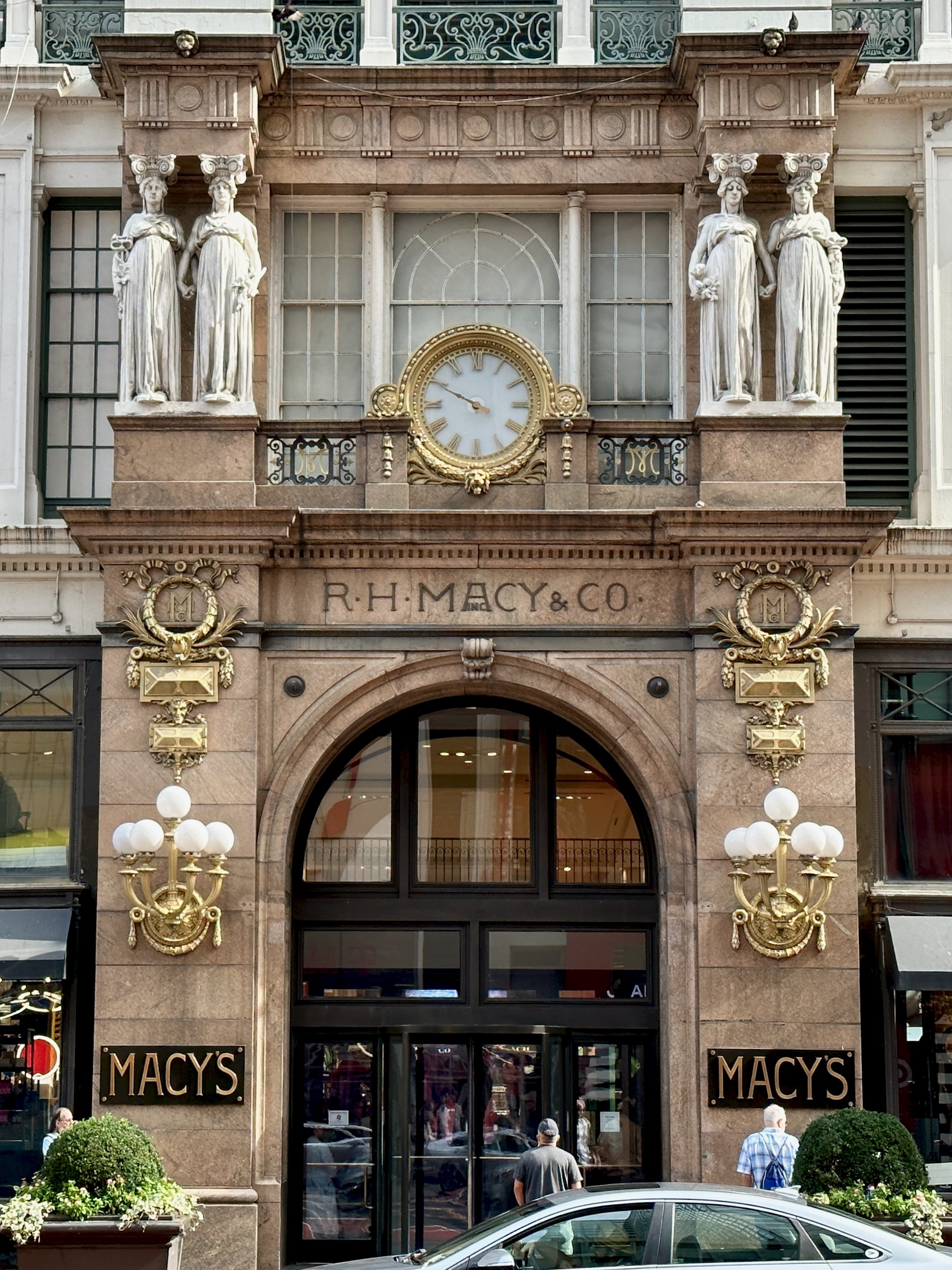
Macy's Herald Square main entrance

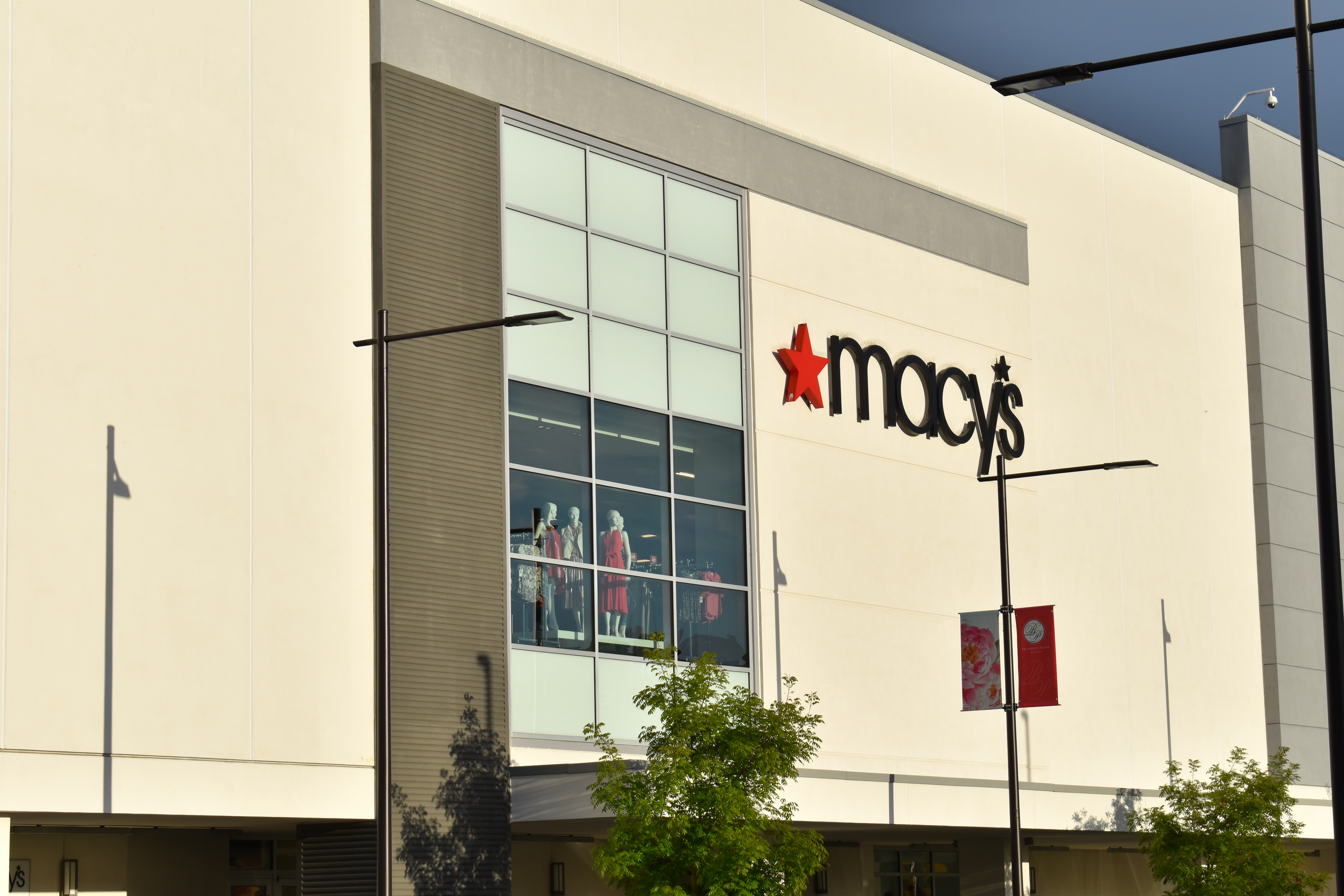
Exterior of a Macy's store located in Walnut Creek, California pictured in 2016. This store was originally an Emporium-Capwell before being converted to Macy's in 1995.

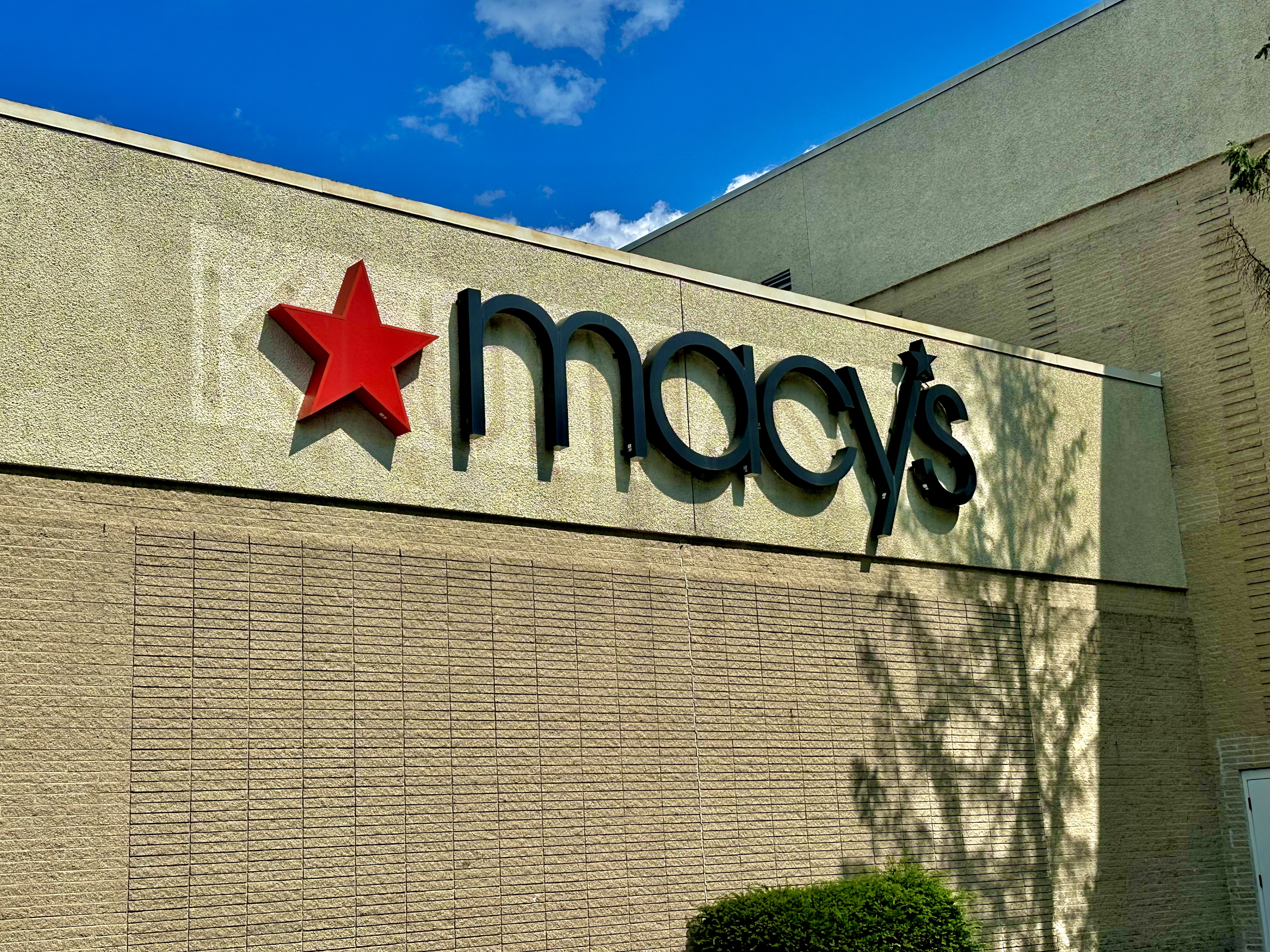
This location at Southern Park Mall opened in 1970 as a Strouss' department store. In 1986, the nameplate changed to Kaufmann's until 2006, when the store was re-branded to Macy's. Even today, there is a visible Kaufmann's labelscar behind the Macy's signage.

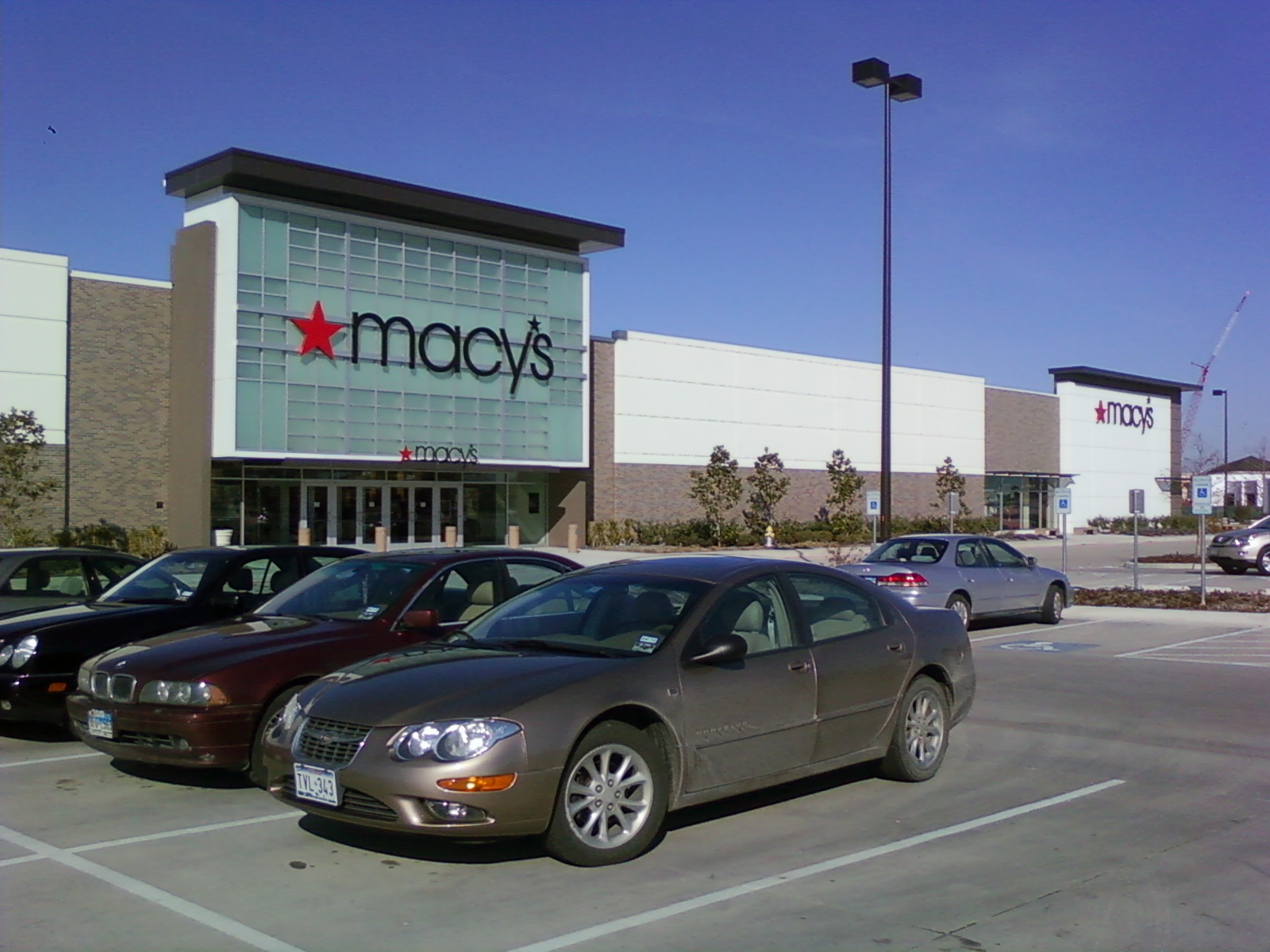
Macy's Lifestyle Store in Fairview, Texas, opened on August 5, 2009

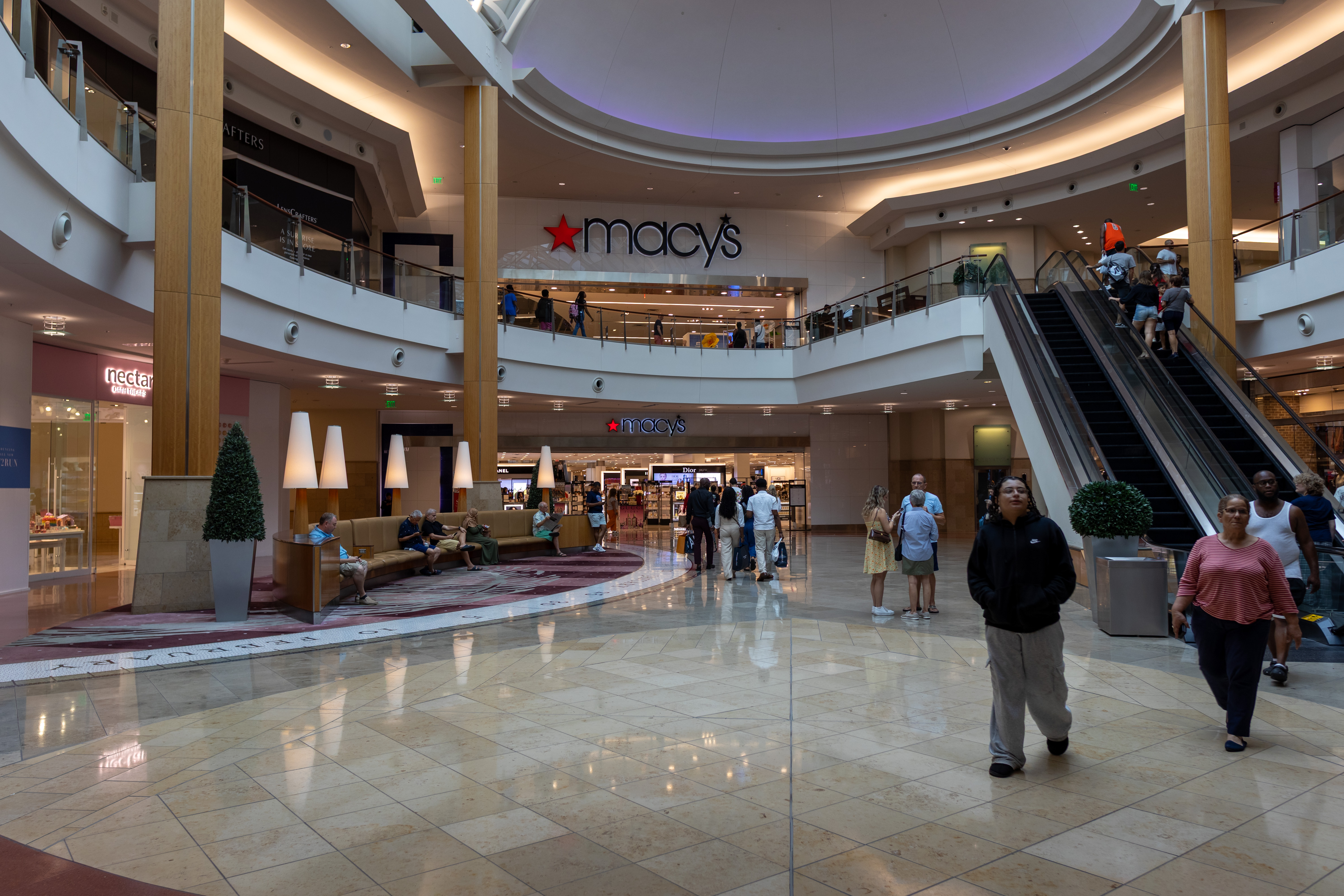
This three-story Macy's store (seen in 2025) located at The Mall at Millenia in Orlando, Florida, first opened in 2002 as part of the mall's grand opening. It was the first Macy's store to open in Central Florida, as all the other stores in the region were converted from Burdines. It was also one of seven Macy's stores in Florida (and the only one in Central Florida) that predated the Burdines–Macy's merger.

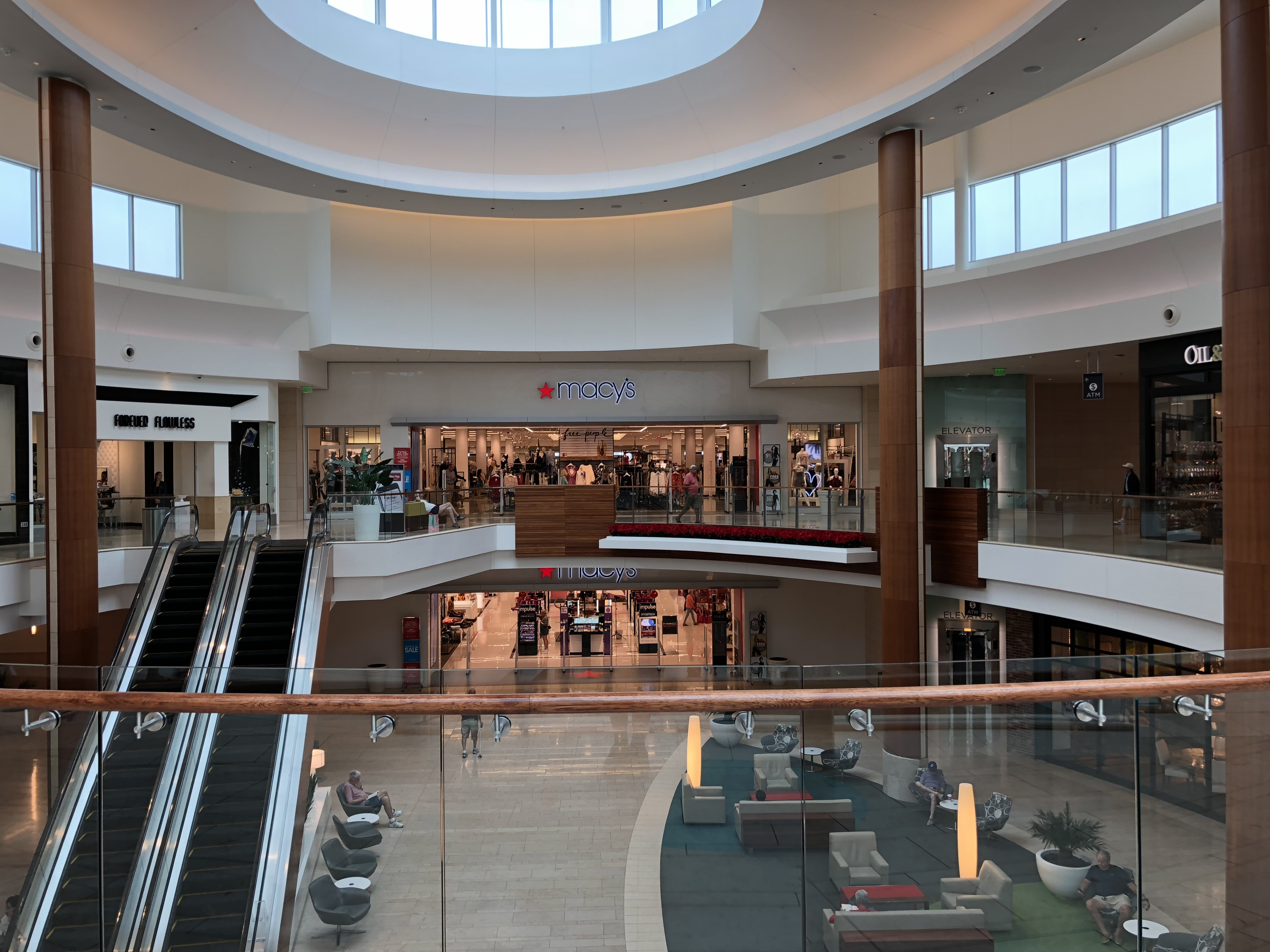
Entrances to a two-story Macy's store (seen 2017) inside The Mall at University Town Center in Sarasota, Florida, originally built in 2014

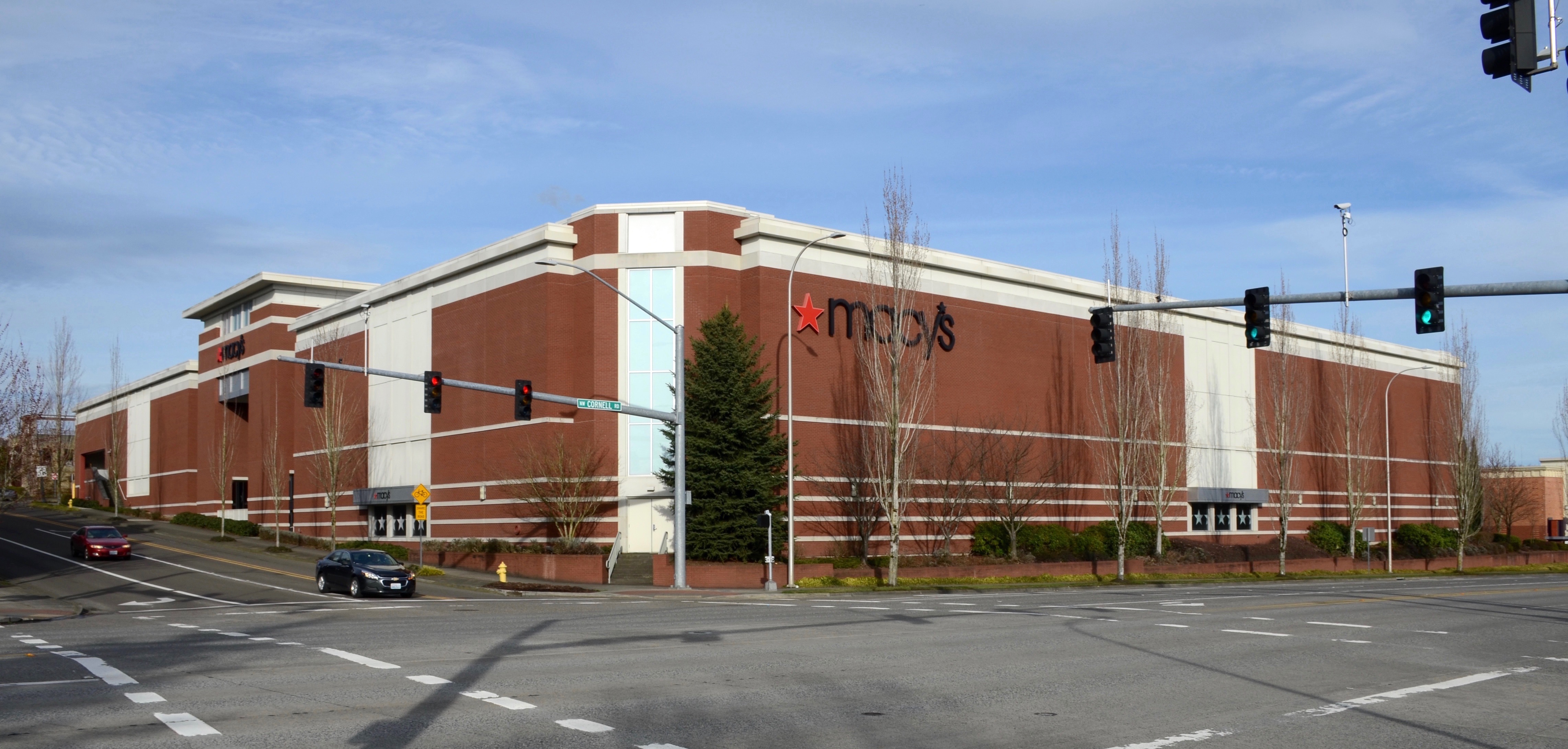
Exterior of the Macy's store at The Streets of Tanasbourne in Hillsboro, Oregon (closed in March 2025) (2017)

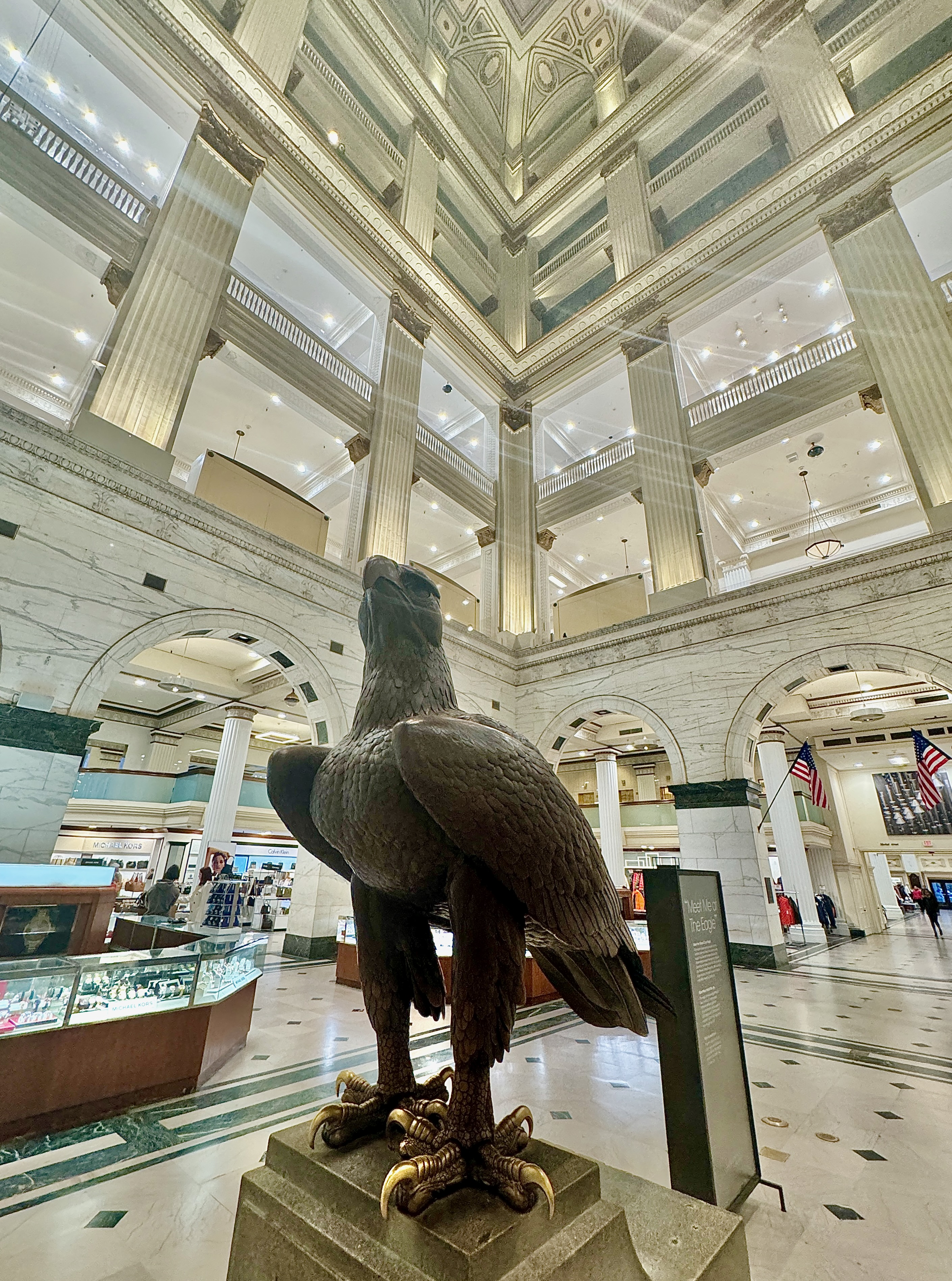
"Meet me at the eagle" was a common Philadelphia phrase to meet at Wanamaker's flagship store, converted to Macy's Center City.

== See also ==
- List of department stores of the United States
