= John Wanamaker Store =

Building in Philadelphia, Pennsylvania

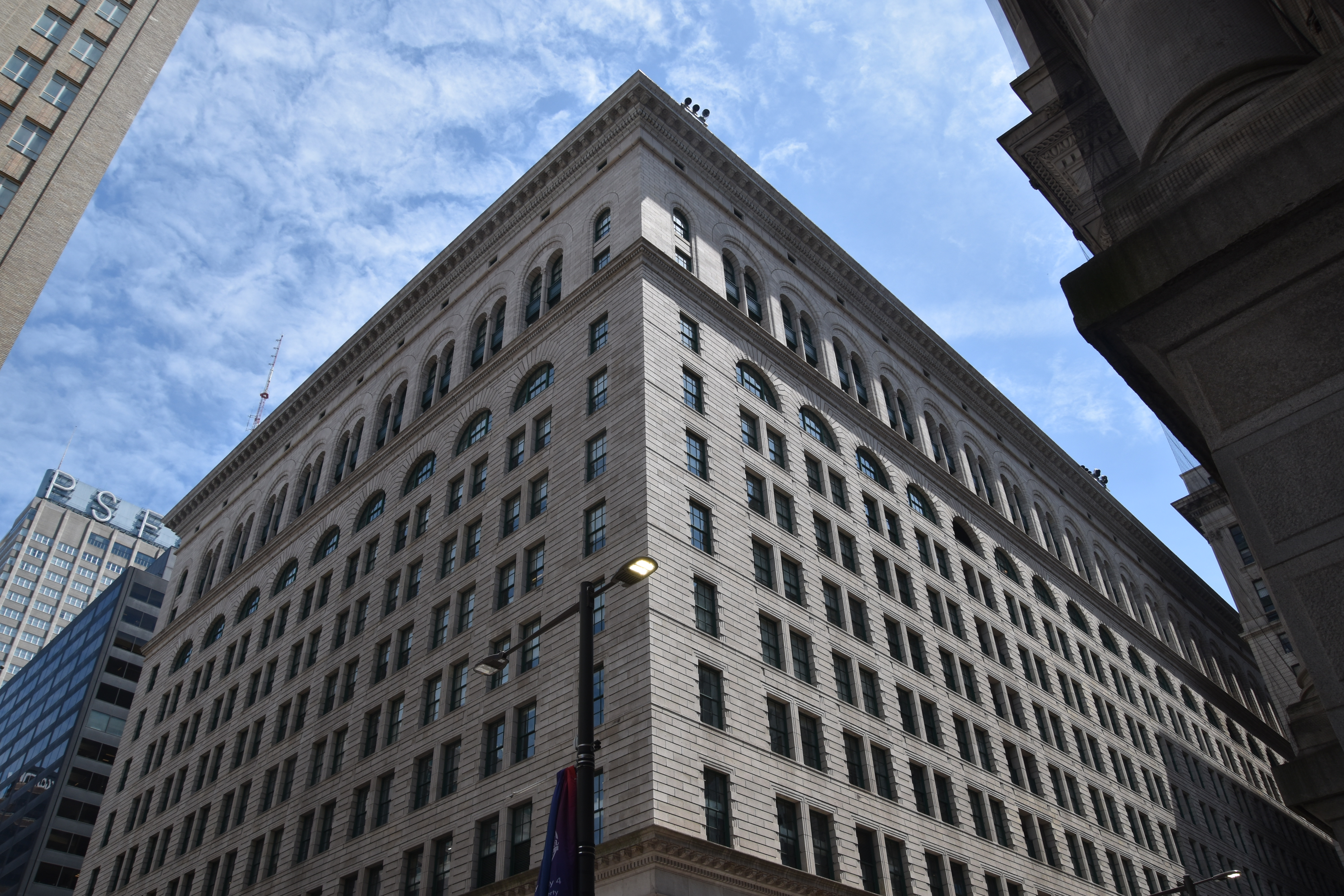
- Exterior of the John Wanamaker Store (2022)

General information
- Status: Closed
- Type: Department store
- Architectural style: Renaissance
- Location: 1300 Market Street, Philadelphia, Pennsylvania, United States
- Coordinates: 39°57′5.98″N 75°9′43.81″W
- Year built: 1910–1911
- Opened: 1911; 115 years ago (Wanamaker's); September 3, 1995; 31 years ago (Hecht's); July 15, 1996; 30 years ago (Strawbridge's); August 6, 1997; 29 years ago (Lord & Taylor); August 2, 2006; 20 years ago (Macy's)
- Closed: August 28, 1995; 31 years ago (Wanamaker's); July 15, 1996; 30 years ago (Hecht's); February 1, 1997; 29 years ago (Strawbridge's); June 1, 2006; 20 years ago (Lord & Taylor); March 23, 2025; 19 months ago (Macy's)
- Client: John Wanamaker

Technical details
- Floor count: 12

Design and construction
- Architect: Daniel Burnham
- John Wanamaker Store
- U.S. National Register of Historic Places
- U.S. National Historic Landmark
- Pennsylvania state historical marker
- Location within Philadelphia Location within Pennsylvania Location within the United States
- NRHP reference No.: 78002459

Significant dates
- Added to NRHP: June 2, 1978
- Designated NRHP: June 2, 1978
- Designated PHMC: July 11, 1998

The Wanamaker Building is a historic former department store on Market Street in the Center City district of Philadelphia, Pennsylvania, United States. Designed by Daniel Burnham for John Wanamaker, it opened in 1911 as the flagship store of the Wanamaker's department store chain. The building is designated as a National Historic Landmark.

The building replaced Wanamaker's first store on the grounds, founded in 1876. It was acquired by The May Department Stores Company in 1994, and converted to the May-owned Hecht's, Strawbridge's, and Lord & Taylor chains between 1995 and 2006. May was acquired by Federated Department Stores in 2005, and the building was converted to the Federated-owned Macy's in 2006. Macy's closed the store in 2025.

In October 2026, plans were announced to convert the building to house 622 apartments on the upper floors, with a 30,000 square foot food court on the ground level.

It contains the Wanamaker Organ, the largest functional organ in the world.

== History ==
=== Wanamaker's (1910–1995) ===
In 1910, John Wanamaker replaced his existing Grand Depot in stages, and constructed a new, purpose-built structure on the same site in Center City Philadelphia. The new store, built in the Florentine style with granite walls by Chicago architect Daniel H. Burnham, had 12 floors (nine for retail), numerous galleries and two lower levels totaling nearly two million square feet. The palatial emporium featured the Wanamaker Organ, the former St. Louis World's Fair pipe organ, at the time one of the world's largest organs. The organ was installed in the store's marble-clad central atrium known as the Grand Court. Another item from the St. Louis Fair in the Grand Court is the large bronze eagle, which quickly became the symbol of the store and a favorite meeting place for shoppers. All one had to say was "Meet You at The Eagle" and everyone knew where to go. The store was dedicated by President William Howard Taft on December 30, 1911.

Despite its size, the organ was deemed insufficient to fill the Grand Court with its music. Wanamaker's responded by assembling its own staff of organ builders and expanding the organ several times over a period of years. The "Wanamaker Organ" is the largest fully operational pipe organ in the world, with some 28,750 pipes. It is famed for the delicate, orchestra-like beauty of its tone as well as its incredible power. The organ still stands in place in the store today and free recitals are held twice every day except Sunday. Visitors are also invited to tour the organ's console area and meet with staff after recitals. Once a year, usually in June, "Wanamaker Organ Day" is held, which is a free recital which lasts most of the day. The New York store also housed a large organ; it was sold at auction in 1955 for $1,200 (~$11,240 in 2025) after the New York store closed the year prior.

In October 1987, the Wanamaker Building was sold to developer John Kusmiersky for $50 million. The historic Wanamaker's flagship store was reduced to the building's first five stories, leased back from the new owners. The upper stories were converted to offices. The Juniper Street side became the office building lobby, and the former basement budget "Downstairs Store" became a parking garage. The Crystal Tea Room restaurant was closed and eventually leased to the Marriott Corporation for use as a ballroom. Personal effects of Mr. Wanamaker from his until-then preserved office on the eighth floor, and the store archives, were donated to the Historical Society of Pennsylvania. Beloved huge Easter paintings Christ before Pilate (1881) and Golgotha (1884) by Mihály Munkácsy that had been personal favorites of Mr. Wanamaker and were displayed every year in the Grand Court during Lent were unceremoniously sold at auction in 1988.

The Wanamaker's flagship store, with its famous organ and eagle from the St. Louis World's Fair, was designated a National Historic Landmark in 1978. In 1992, a nonprofit group, the Friends of the Wanamaker Organ, was founded to promote the preservation, restoration and presentation of the famous pipe organ.

=== Hecht's, Strawbridge's, and Lord & Taylor (1995–2006) ===
Parent company Woodward & Lothrop collapsed in bankruptcy, filing for Chapter 11 on January 17, 1994. The Wanamaker's chain was sold to May Department Stores Company on June 21, 1995. Wanamaker's Inc. was formally dissolved, and operations were consolidated with May's Hecht's division in Arlington, Virginia. After 133 consecutive years, the Wanamaker's name was removed from all stores and replaced with Hecht's on November 1, 1995.

In April 1996, May acquired Wanamaker's historic rival Strawbridge & Clothier and re-branded all Philadelphia-area Hecht's locations as Strawbridge's, including the Center City flagship in July 1996.

The building closed for renovation and refurbishment in late 1996, which saw the retail space reduced in size again to three floors, with two more upper floors converted to commercial office space. The flagship structure was sold again in early 1997, to Amerimar Realty. The retail portion reopened in August 1997 as a branch of New York-based Lord & Taylor, another division of May Department Stores. In August 2006 the store was converted to Macy's, operated by the Macy's East Division of Federated Department Stores Inc., now Macy's, Inc., which acquired May in late 2005.

=== Macy's (2006–2025) ===
With a long tradition of parades and fireworks displays, Macy's took a prominent civic role in fostering historic Wanamaker traditions, especially the Wanamaker Organ and the Christmas Light Show. Beginning in 2006, under Macy's, Julie Andrews became the show's narrator. Also in 2006, the Santa Express Train at the top of the Grand Court returned. In 2007, the entire Christmas Light Show was completely modernized and rebuilt by Macy's Parade Studio on new trusses with lighter materials and LED lighting. In 2008, a new and bigger Magic Christmas Tree with LED lights debuted. However, due to safety concerns and logistical issues, the dancing water fountains were retired and sold.

In 2008, Macy's celebrated its 150th birthday in the Philadelphia flagship store with a concert featuring the Wanamaker Organ and the Philadelphia Orchestra that attracted a capacity audience. At that point, only 3 floors of the building were still being used as department store sales area.

In September 2023 the building went into receivership, after a substantial loss of its commercial tenants. In January 2024, the owners announced that they were considering converting the building to apartments.

=== Closure and renovation (2025–present) ===
On January 9, 2025, Macy's announced that their Wanamaker Building store would close in March. The store hosted a day of concerts on its historic organ on March 22, 2025, and closed the next evening, March 23, 2025. The building reopened for special events afterward, including a Christmas show and the Dickens Village during Christmas 2025.

Architecture firm PAU were subsequently hired in December 2025 to draw up plans to renovate the building. In October 2026, plans were announced to convert the building to house 622 apartments on the upper floors, with a 30,000 square foot food court located in the historic Grand Court atrium on the ground level. The building's skylight, covered over during World War II, will be restored. Completion is scheduled for 2028.>

== Flagship store setup ==
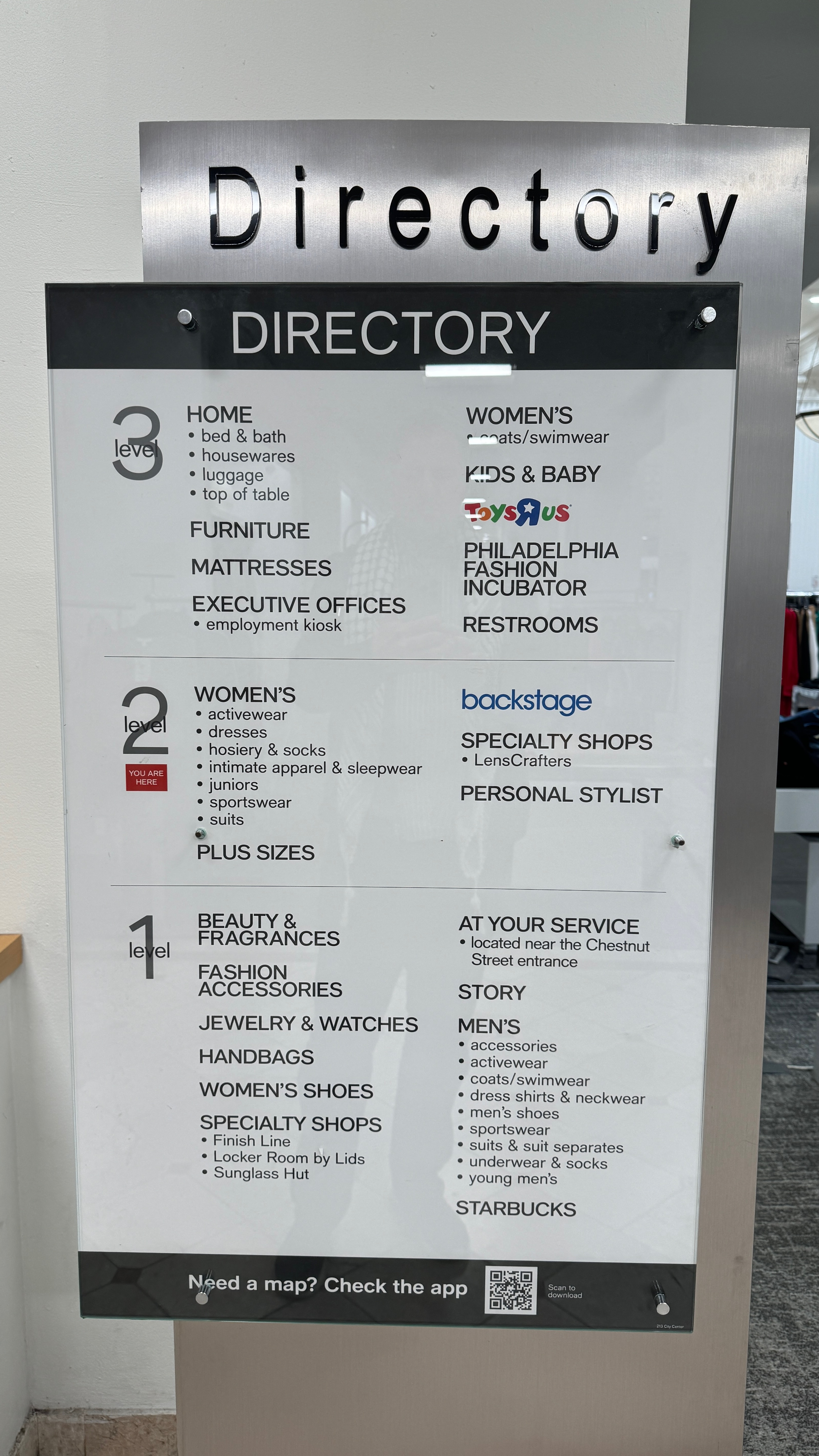
The store directory of Macy's Center City in February 2024

- Ground floor: 2,500-pound "Durana" bronze eagle statue in the Grand Court, made by German sculptor August Gaul for the 1904 Louisiana Purchase Exhibition and purchased by John Wanamaker; to this day, Philadelphians frequently agree to "meet me at the eagle" at Wanamaker's.
- 3rd floor: Egyptian Hall auditorium behind the executive offices, also a Greek Hall auditorium. As of 2008, the architecture of Egyptian Hall is obscured by the Executive Offices and Dickens Christmas Village.
- 8th floor: Toy department had a Rocket Express monorail (from 1946 to 1984) for the kids that traveled around the toy department, camera department, and piano and organ department. The monorail car is a static display at Philadelphia's Please Touch Museum.
- 9th floor: Crystal Tea Room
- 10th floor: In-house physician and nurses
- 12th floor: Wanamaker Organ Shop, where the Wanamaker Organ was enlarged by an in-house expert staff
- Sub-floors: The Downstairs Store, post office, lost and found, shoe repair, the Dairy Bar restaurant. This area became a parking garage.
- Radio broadcasting station
- Model house on the furniture floor
- Home of the world's largest playable pipe organ

=== Crystal Tea Room ===
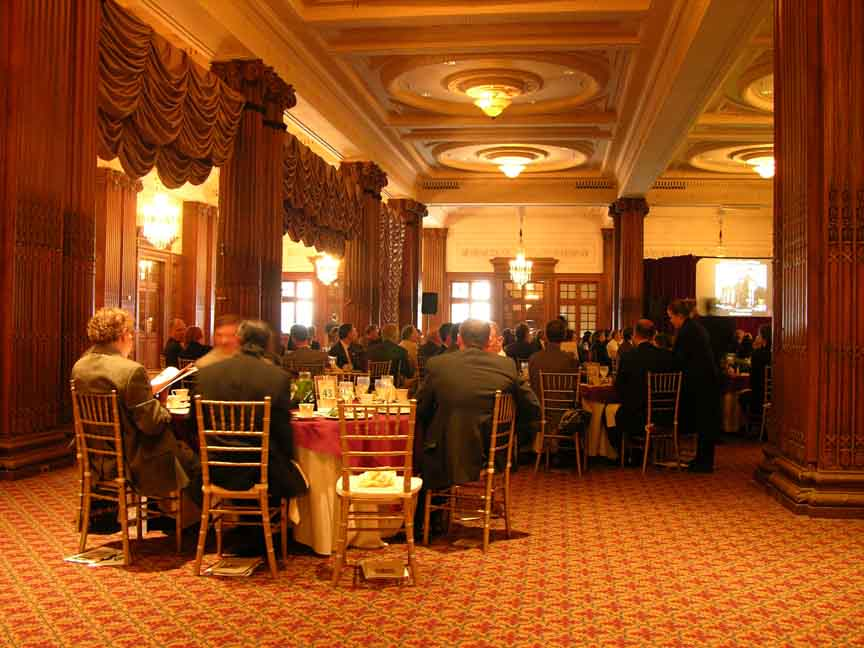
The Crystal Tea Room, one of the largest dining rooms in the world as of the early 20th century, in 2007

Wanamaker's was home to the Crystal Tea Room restaurant on the 9th floor. A Wanamaker's guidebook from the 1920s called it the largest dining room in Philadelphia, and one of the largest in the world, capable of serving 1,400 diners at a time. It served breakfast in the morning, luncheon, and afternoon tea. The kitchen's ovens could roast 75 turkeys at once and the facility was equipped with lockers and baths for the employees. In acknowledgment of John Wanamaker's promotion of temperance causes, alcohol was not served in the Tea Room until after the family trust sold the store. There was informal modeling in the Tea Room. The restaurant closed to the public in 1995. It later reopened as a function space, operated by Finley Catering since 2001. It can accommodate sit-down receptions of up to 1,000 people.

There was also a balcony café, the Terrace on the Court, on the third floor facing the Grand Court, where shoppers could hear the Wanamaker Organ as they dined. Macy's closed this restaurant in 2008.

== Christmas festivities ==
=== Wanamaker Light Show ===
In 1956, the Philadelphia Wanamaker's premiered a Christmas Light Show, a large musical and blinking light display several stories high, viewable from several levels of the building. Its popularity with Philadelphia parents and children, as well as tourists, ensured a continuous run, even after the building was sold to different business interests.

Until 1994, the melodic baritone narrator of the show was John Facenda, known to Philadelphians for decades reporting the news on radio and television and known nationally as the voice of NFL Films. Various announcers narrated the show between 1995 and 2005. The show is currently narrated by Julie Andrews and has accompanying Christmas carols by The Ray Conniff Singers.

The show was temporarily suspended for the 2026 and 2027 Christmas season. A nearby museum, the Ministry of Awe, hosted a light show inspired by the Wanamaker Light Show during that time.

=== Dickens Village ===
A miniature walkthrough Christmas village takes place on the third floor of the building, with the village themed around Charles Dickens' 1843 novella A Christmas Carol.

== In popular culture ==
The outside of the store appears in the 1981 thriller film Blow Out. The store was used as a filming location for the fictional Prince & Company department store in the 1987 film Mannequin and its 1991 sequel, Mannequin Two: On the Move. The 1995 science fiction film 12 Monkeys also features the store.

== Gallery ==
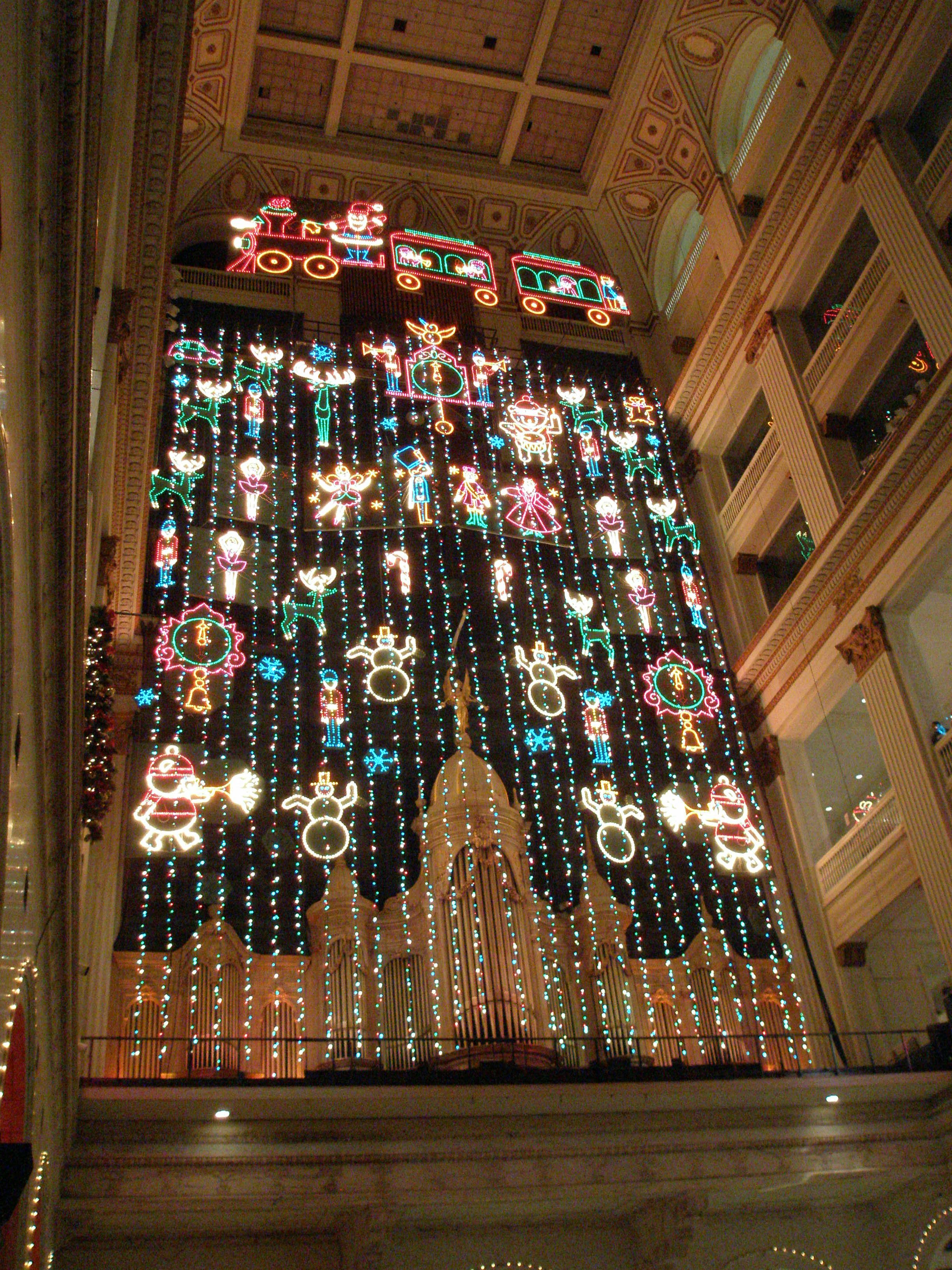
The original Christmas light show in 2006

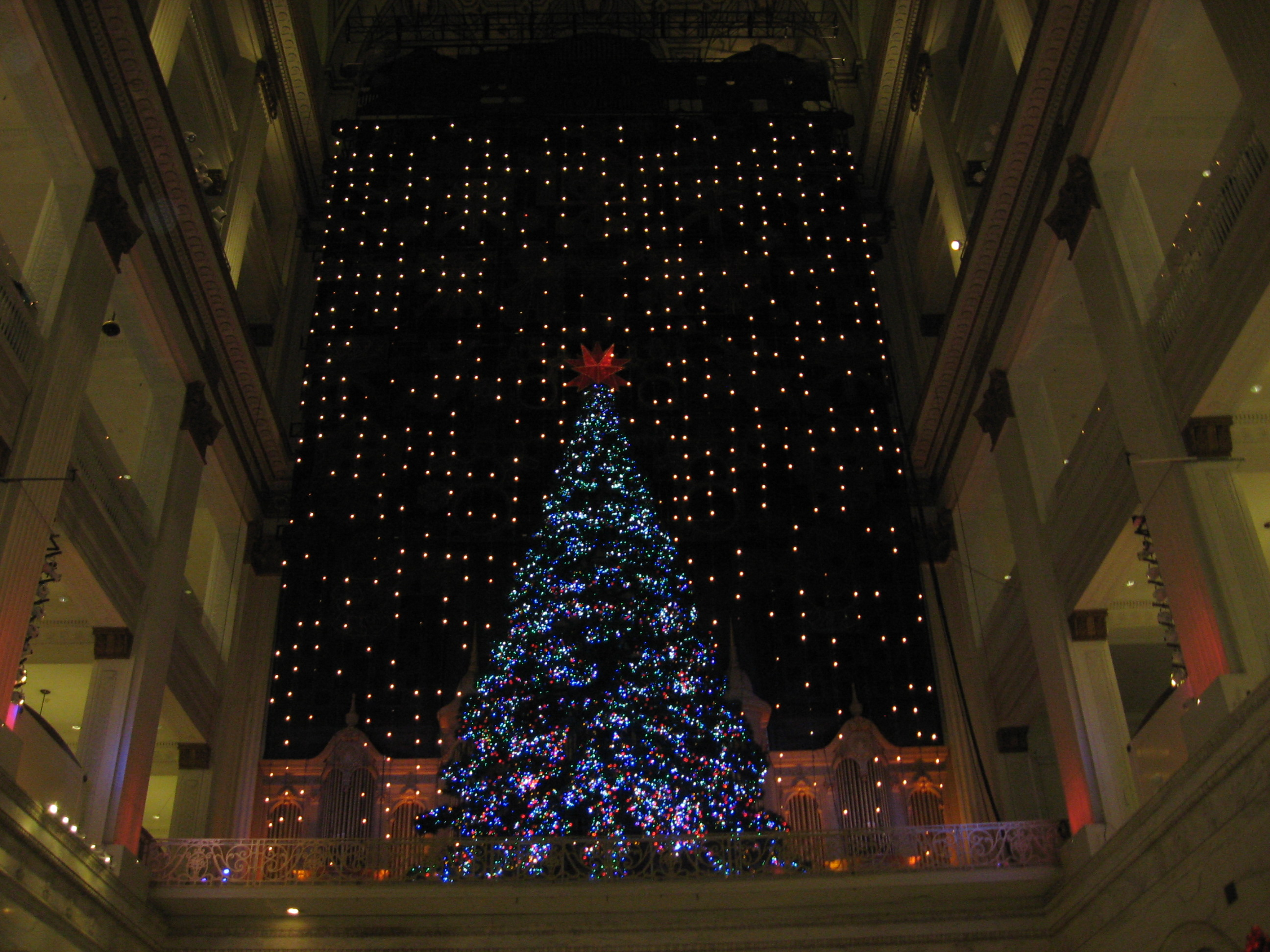
The Christmas light show in 2013

== See also ==
- List of National Historic Landmarks in Philadelphia
- National Register of Historic Places listings in Center City, Philadelphia
- Please Touch Museum (Wanamaker's Rocket Express Monorail)
- Other National Historic Landmark department stores:
  - 280 Broadway
  - Macy's Herald Square
  - Marshall Field and Company Building
  - Sullivan Center
