= Santaland =

Christmas event

Macy's Santaland is an interactive experience for children and adults that takes place annually since 1862 during November and December at Macy's Herald Square.

The installation spans 13,000 square feet and has over 200,000 visitors per year, and is built on the 8th floor of Macy's Herald Square. The installation has fake snow and a train meant to signify taking people to the North Pole. It also includes train, snowmen, and a colorful rainbow bridge.

It is free for families to visit Santa, with reservations starting at 6:30am. If families would like to add a professional picture package, they start at $39.99. Santaland starts the day after the Macy's Santa rides through the Macy's Thanksgiving Day Parade.

Every year, Macy's hired over a hundred elves to help customers throughout the season.

In popular culture, Santaland was represented at central location of David Sedaris' Santaland Diaries.
