= Macy's Herald Square =

Flagship department store in New York City

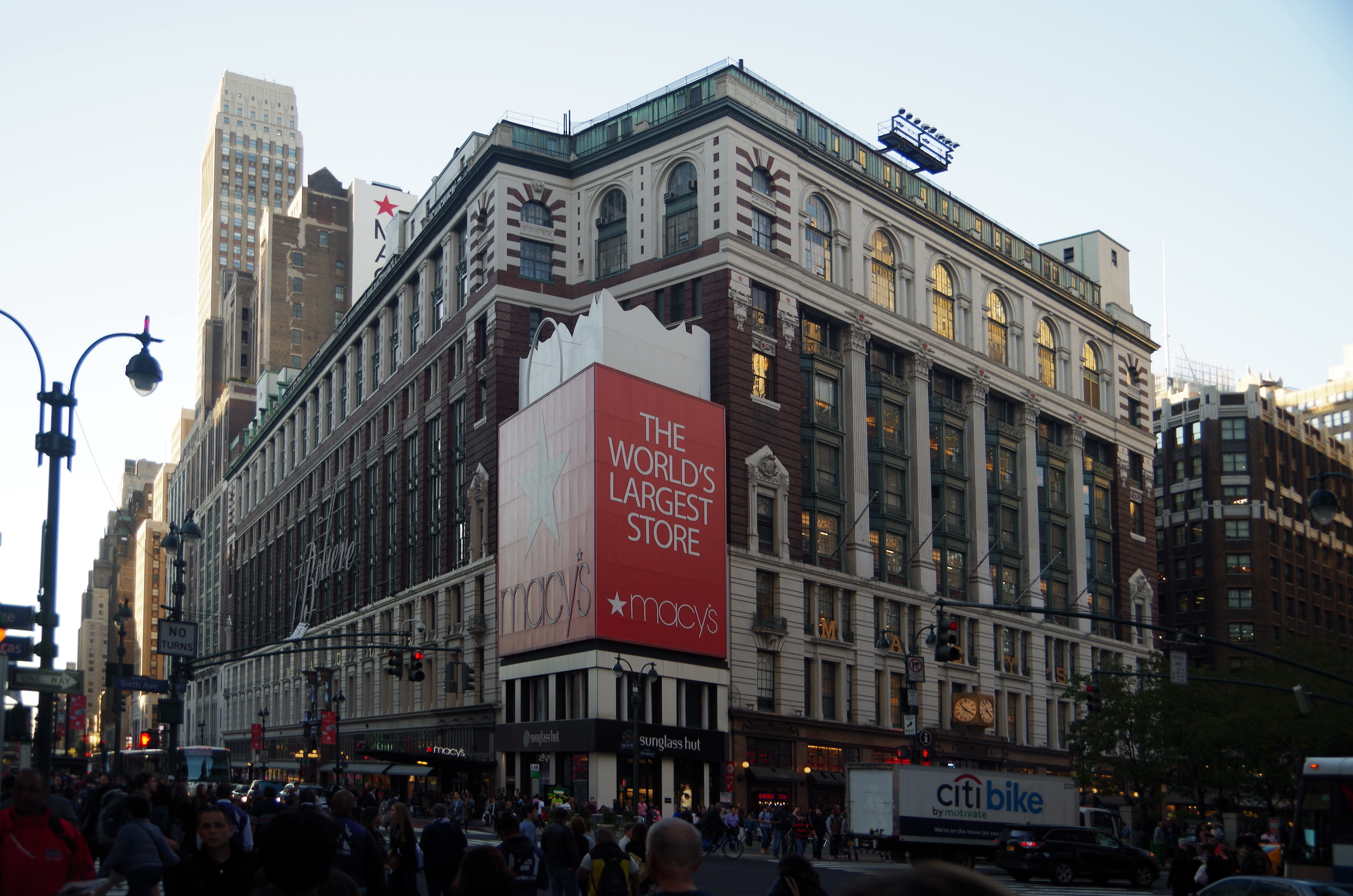
- (November 2015)

General information
- Status: Operational
- Type: Department store; office
- Architectural style: Palladian; Art Deco
- Location: 151 West 34th Street, New York City, New York, United States
- Coordinates: 40°45′01″N 73°59′18″W
- Current tenants: Macy's
- Named for: Rowland Hussey Macy
- Years built: 1901–1902; 1924; 1928; 1931
- Opened: 1902; 124 years ago
- Renovated: 2012–2015
- Renovation cost: US$400 million
- Client: Isidor Straus; Nathan Straus

Technical details
- Size: 2.5 million square feet (230,000 m^{2})
- Floor area: 1.25 million square feet (116,000 m^{2}) of selling space

Design and construction
- Architects: Theodore de Lemos; A. W. Cordes; Robert D. Kohn
- Architecture firm: De Lemos & Cordes

Renovating team
- Renovating firm: Studio V Architecture; Kevin Kennon Architects

Other information
- Public transit: New York City Subway: at 34th Street–Herald Square

Website
- Store information
- R. H. Macy and Company Store
- U.S. National Register of Historic Places
- U.S. National Historic Landmark
- New York State Register of Historic Places
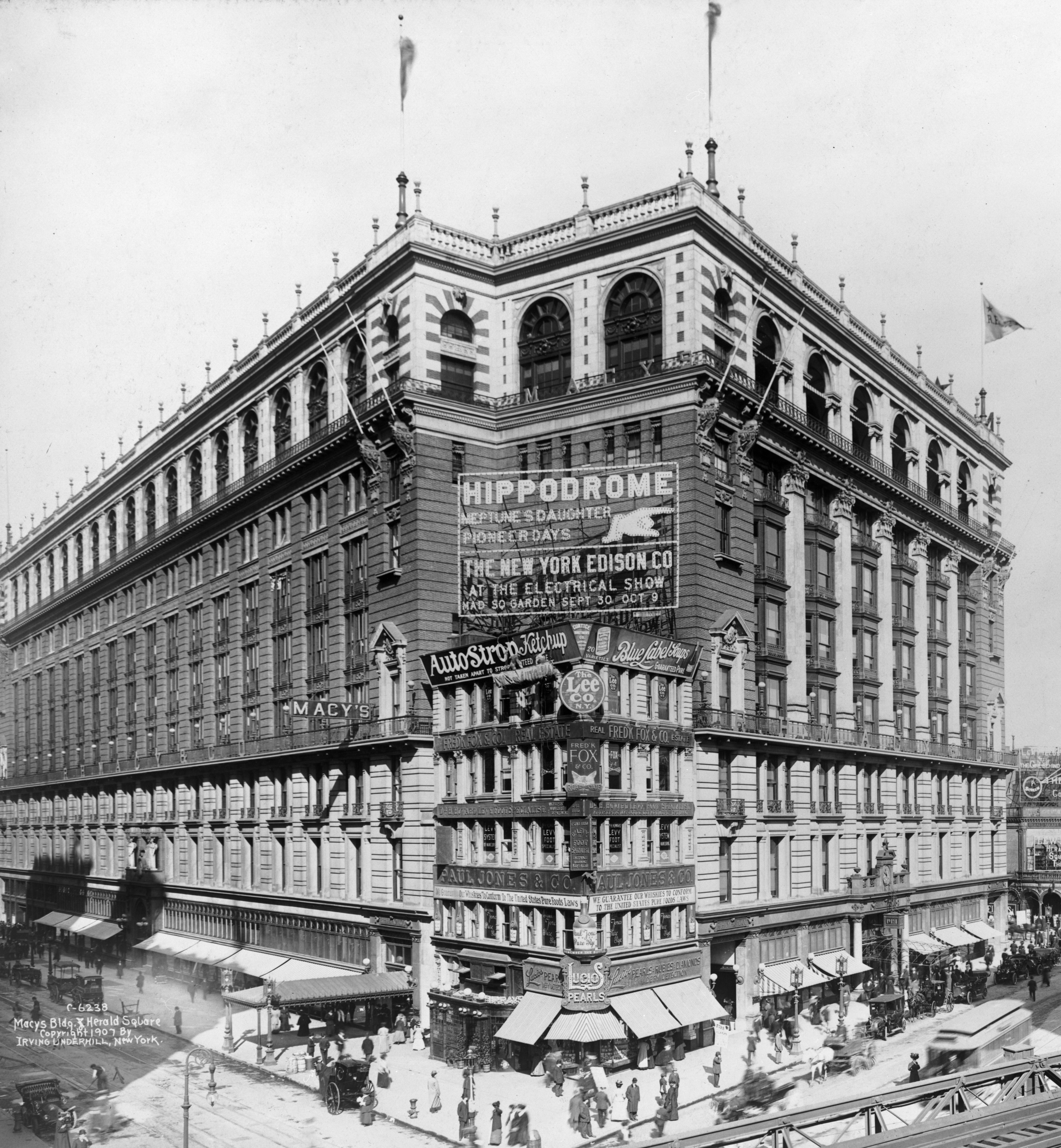
- Exterior of the R. H. Macy and Company Store (1907)

- Location within Manhattan Location within New York City Location within New York Location within the United States
- NRHP reference No.: 78001873
- NYSRHP No.: 06101.001712

Significant dates
- Designated NRHP: June 2, 1978
- Designated NHL: June 2, 1978
- Designated NYSRHP: June 23, 1980

Macy's Herald Square (originally named the R. H. Macy and Company Store) is a department store building on West 34th Street at Herald Square in New York City, New York, United States. It was designed by A. W. Cordes and Theodore de Lemos for Isidor and Nathan Straus, and opened in 1902; expansions designed by Robert D. Kohn opened in 1924, 1928, and 1931, and completed the present-day building. It is the flagship store of the Macy's department store chain, and the headquarters of its holding company Macy's, Inc. The building has a floor area of about 2.2 million square feet (200,000 m^{2}), making it the largest department store in the United States and one of the largest in the world. It was added to the National Register of Historic Places and was made a National Historic Landmark in 1978.

== History ==
=== Previous flagship locations ===
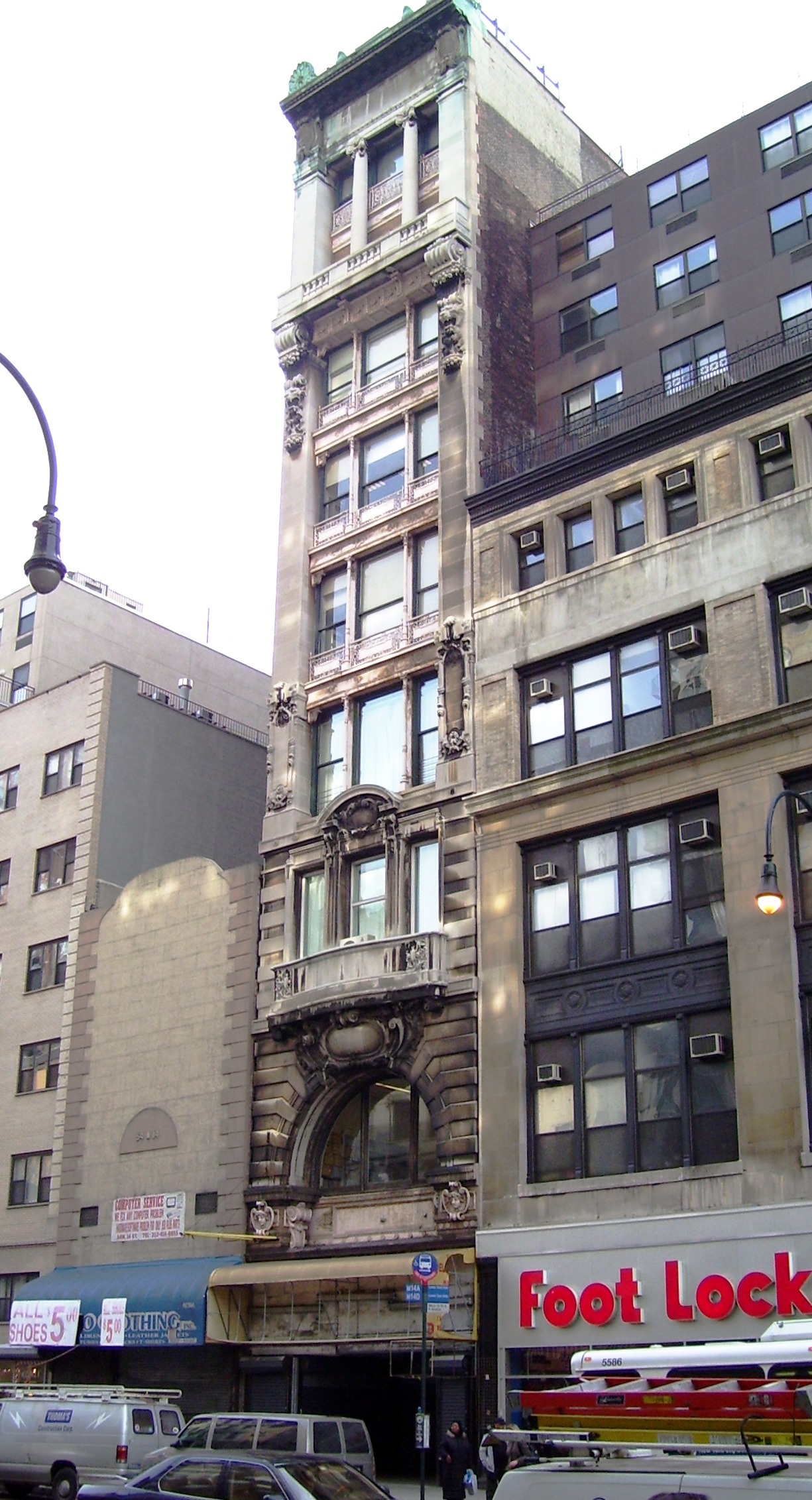
An early Macy's building, dating from 1894, at 56 West 14th Street, designated a NYC landmark in 2012

Macy's was founded by Rowland Hussey Macy, who between 1843 and 1855 opened four retail dry goods stores, including the original Macy's store in downtown Haverhill, Massachusetts, established in 1851 to serve the mill industry employees of the area. They all failed, but he learned from his mistakes. He moved to New York City in 1858 and established a new store named "R.H Macy Dry Goods" at Sixth Avenue on the corner of 14th Street. On the company's first day of business on October 28, 1858, sales totaled $11.08, equivalent to $411.56 today. From the very beginning, Macy's logo has included a star in one form or another, echoing a red star-shaped tattoo that Macy got as a teenager when he worked on a Nantucket whaling ship.

As the business grew, Macy's expanded into neighboring buildings, opening more department stores, and used publicity devices such as a store Santa Claus, themed exhibits, and illuminated window displays to draw in customers. The store later moved to 18th Street and Broadway, on the "Ladies' Mile", the elite shopping district of the time, where it remained for nearly forty years.

In 1875, Macy took on two partners, Robert M. Valentine (1850–1879), a nephew; and Abiel T. La Forge (1842–1878) of Wisconsin, who was the husband of a cousin. Macy died just two years later in 1877 from Bright's disease. La Forge died in 1878 and Valentine died in 1879. Ownership of the company was passed down through the Macy family until 1895, when the company, now called "R. H. Macy & Co.", was acquired by Isidor Straus and his brother Nathan Straus, who had previously held a license to sell china and other goods in the Macy's store.

=== Move ===
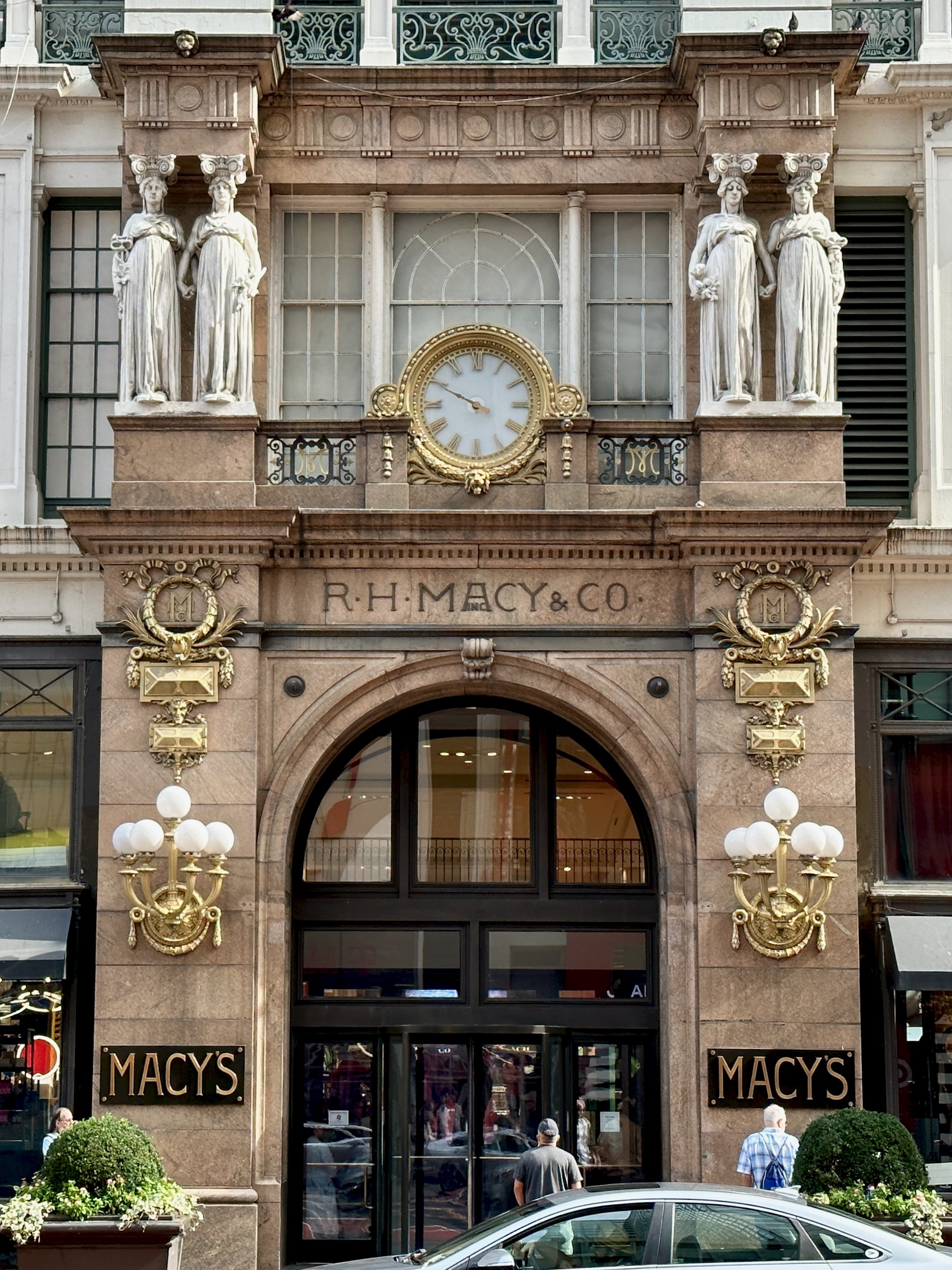
Main entrance on 34th Street

In 1902, the flagship store moved uptown to Herald Square at 34th Street and Broadway, so far north of the other main dry-goods emporia that it had to offer a steam wagonette to transport customers from 14th Street to 34th Street. Although the Herald Square store initially consisted of just one building, it expanded through new construction, eventually occupying almost the entire block bounded by Seventh Avenue on the west, Broadway on the east, 34th Street on the south and 35th Street on the north, with the exception of a small pre-existing building on the corner of 35th Street and Seventh Avenue and another on the corner of 34th Street and Broadway. Robert H. Smith purchased this latter 5-story building in 1900 for $375,000 (equivalent to $11,913,177 in 2025) with the idea of getting in the way of Macy's becoming the largest store in the world: it is largely supposed that Smith, who was a neighbor of the Macy's store on 14th Street, was acting on behalf of Siegel-Cooper, which had built what they thought was the world's largest store on Sixth Avenue in 1896. Macy's ignored the tactic, and simply built around the building, which now carries Macy's "shopping bag" sign by lease arrangement. That building earned the name Million Dollar Corner when it was finally sold for a then record $1 million on December 6, 1911.

The original Broadway store was designed in 1901 and 1902 by architects Theodore de Lemos and A. W. Cordes under their architecture firm De Lemos & Cordes, and was erected by the Fuller Construction Company. It has a Palladian facade, but has been updated in many details. The main entrance on 34th Street features two pairs of caryatids by the Scottish-American sculptor, J. Massey Rhind. Other additions to the west were completed in 1924 and 1928, and the Seventh Avenue building in 1931, all designed by architect Robert D. Kohn, the newer buildings becoming increasingly Art Deco in style. The store boasts several wooden escalators still in operation.

=== Renovations ===
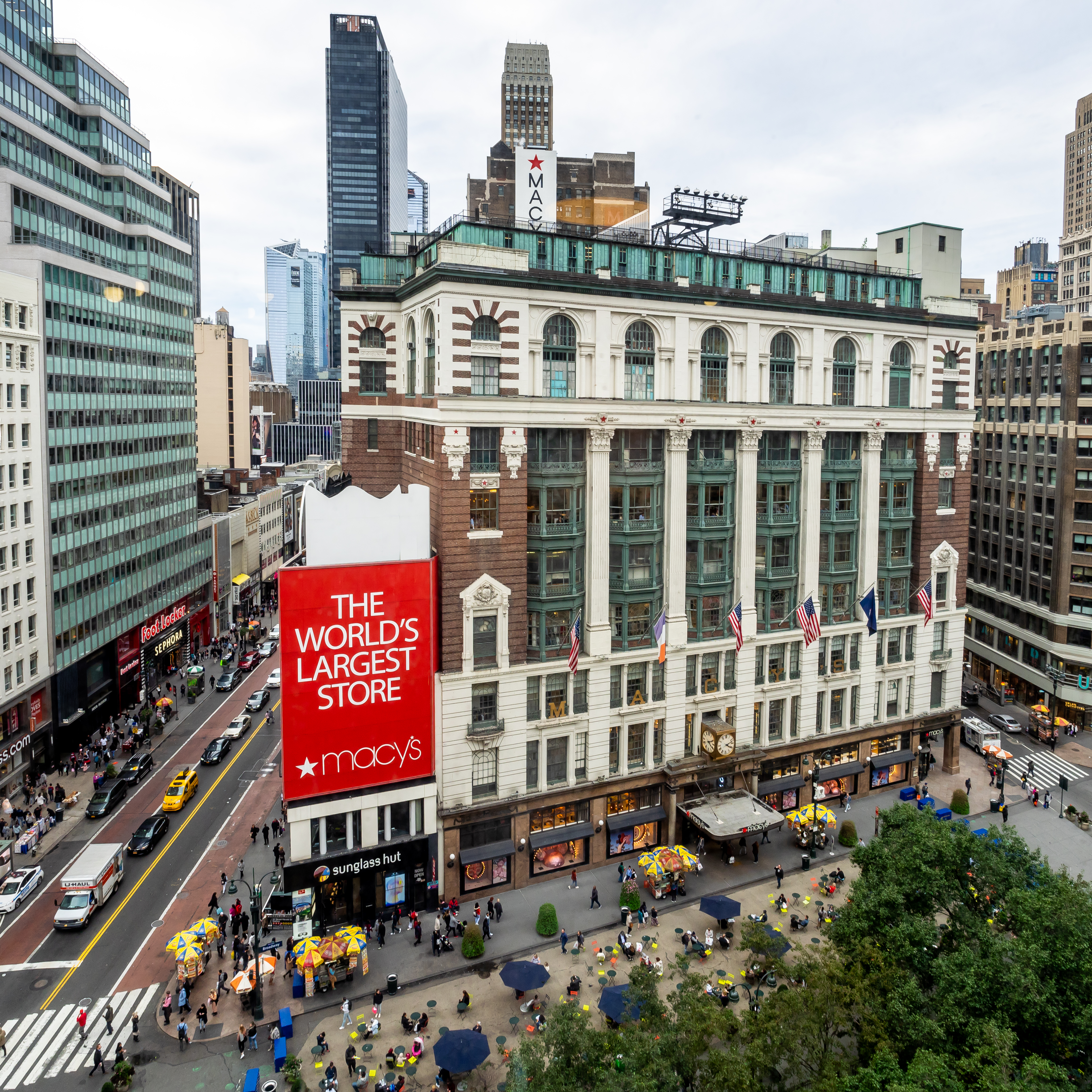
The building in 2018

By the 21st century, the building spanned 2.2 million square feet (200,000 m^{2}). The New York Times wrote in 2014 that the building was one of the world's largest store buildings and that the store had six million annual visitors.

In 2012, Macy's began the first full renovation of the flagship store at a reported cost of $400 million (~$554 million in 2025). Studio V Architecture, a New York-based firm, was the overall master plan architect of the project, with Kevin Kennon Architects providing the exterior and entryway designs. The renovations completed in November 2015 but Macy's continues to modify the store to suit changing customer tastes and maximize return on the real estate.

In 2016, the company explored adding one or two towers to the building to house hotel or office space. The next year, it considered turning the structure's roof into a park. Macy's unveiled plans in 2019 to build a 1.2-million-square-foot (110,000 m^{2}) office building atop the existing store. The following February, the plans were updated: the tower would be over 900 feet (270 m) tall and consist of 1.5 million square feet (140,000 m^{2}) of space, including a sky lobby. The tower's construction would also include improvements to the nearby area.

== Events ==
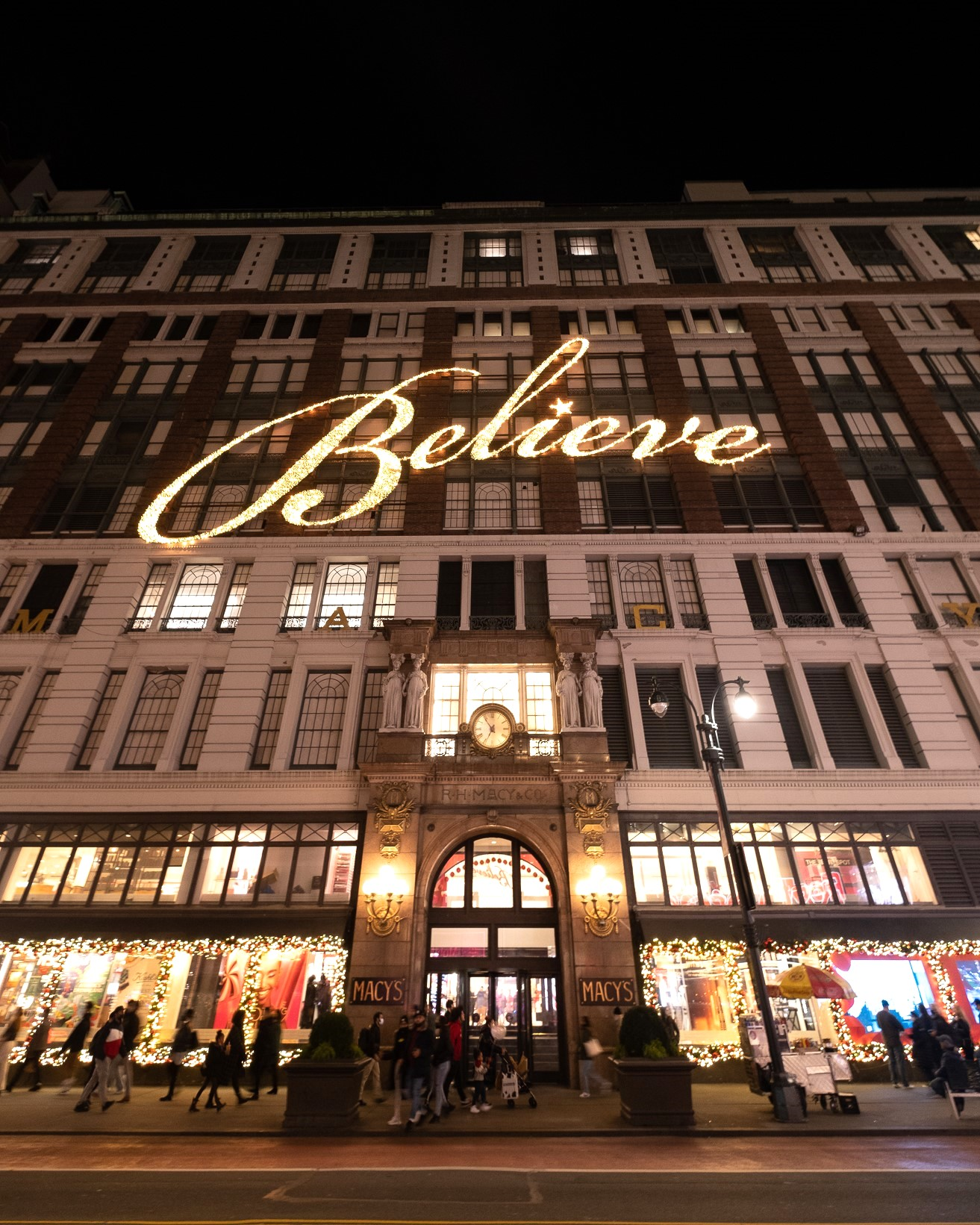
The Christmas season "Believe" sign at Macy's Herald Square

Macy's is noted for its elaborate animated holiday and Christmas window displays in many of its U.S. stores, but most notably at the Herald Square location. Each year presents a different theme shown in six windows on the Broadway side of the building. Each window includes animated displays with complex scenery, attracting thousands of viewers. Since 2012, the windows have been designed, fabricated and animated by Standard Transmission Productions.

In summer 2007, Macy's mounted a public art exhibition at the Herald Square flagship, using its windows to display pieces from fashion designers Misaki Kawai, Anna Sui, and John F. Simon Jr. Art Under Glass was viewable to the public through that year's fashion week.

During World War II, Macy's flagship store at Herald Square also served as the venue for the internationally acclaimed Latin-American Exposition of 1942 which showcased South American culture, architecture, culinary favorites, fashion and music in collaboration with the United States Department of State's Coordinator of Inter-American Affairs (OCIAA) and the CBS Network of the Americas under the patronage of Mrs. Eleanor Roosevelt and ambassadors from throughout South America. It featured daily musical performances by the Argentine composer Terig Tucci under the supervision of the journalist Edmund Chester which were broadcast live to nations throughout Latin-America via short-wave radio as part of President Franklin Roosevelt's Good Neighbor Policy.

Other events include:

External videos
- You may see Macy's Latin-American Fair in the OCIAA documentary film Pan-American Bazar (1942) Here

- Macy's Thanksgiving Day Parade: the world's largest parade, it takes place annually on Thanksgiving Day and ends at Macy's Herald Square.
- Macy's Santaland: an area with Christmas decorations and toys where children can meet and be photographed with Santa Claus.
- Macy's Flower Show: an annual spring event where flowers are coordinated to bloom as they are installed in the store.
- Macy's Believe campaign: a fundraiser for the Make-A-Wish Foundation used during the holiday season.

== Partnerships ==
Through a partnership with tech retailer b8ta, "The Market @ Macy's" section features pop-up spaces for new brands.

== Miscellaneous ==
The store has an in-store jail, Room 140, where customers suspected of shoplifting are detained.

== See also ==
- National Historic Landmarks in New York City
- National Register of Historic Places listings in Manhattan from 14th to 59th Streets
- Other National Historic Landmark department stores:
  - 280 Broadway
  - John Wanamaker Store
  - Marshall Field and Company Building
  - Sullivan Center
