= Theodore de Lemos =

American architect

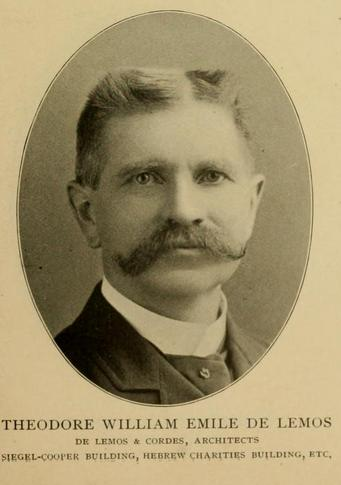
Theodore de Lemos

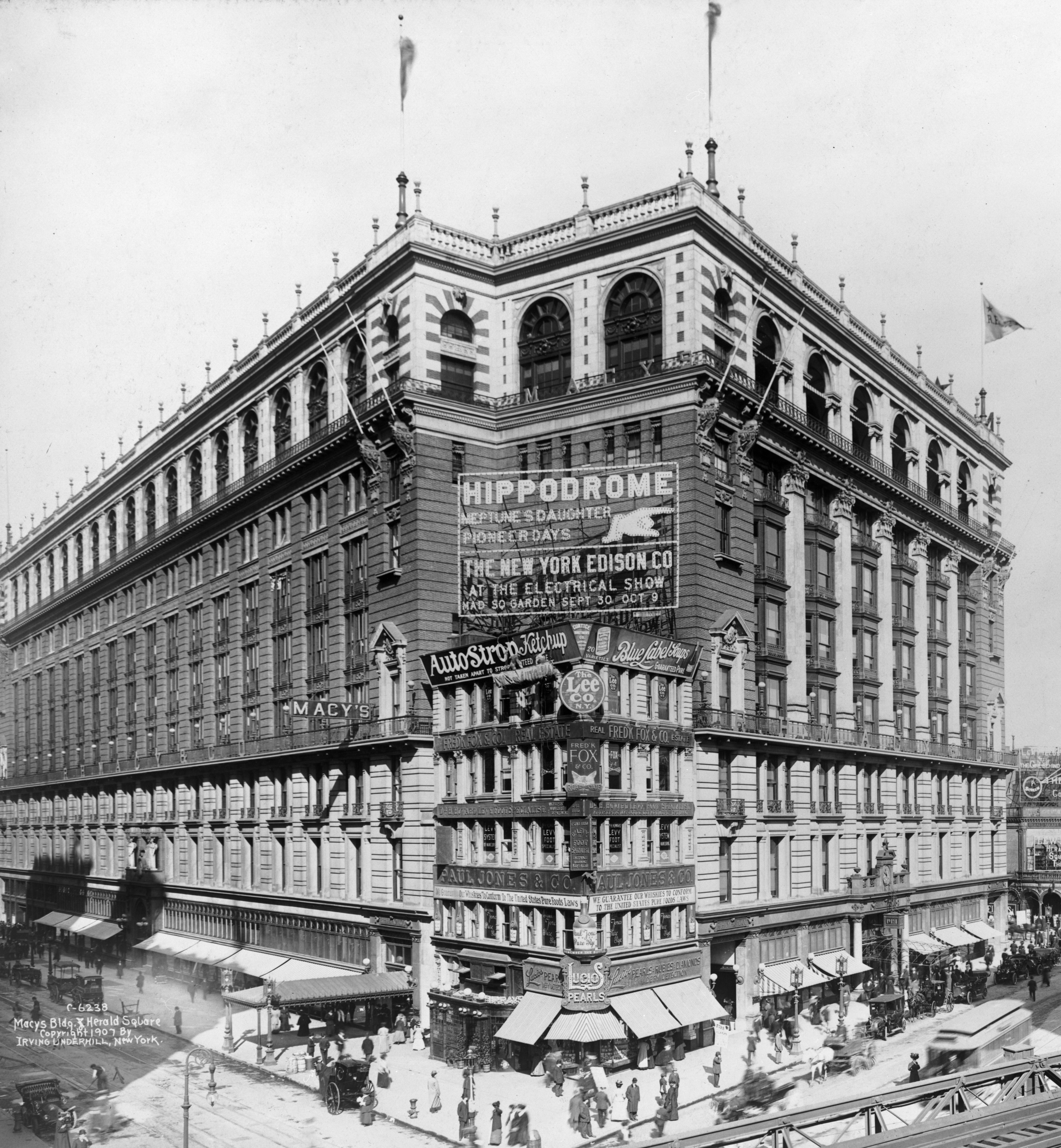
Macy's Herald Square department store

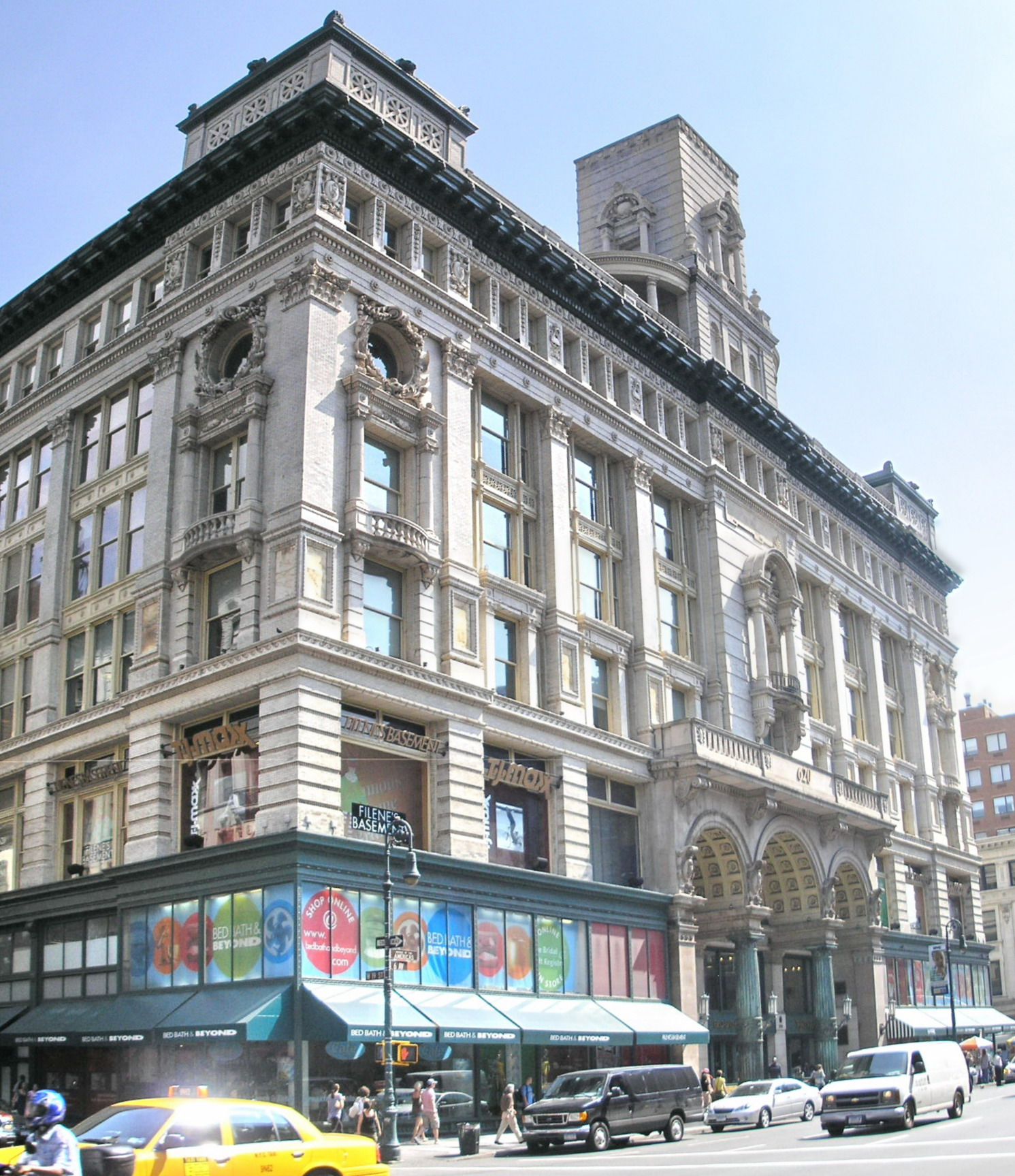
Siegel-Cooper Company department store, West 19th Street and 6th Avenue, Manhattan

Theodore de Lemos (1850, Holstein, German Confederation – 12 April 1909, New York City, New York, United States), son of Hermann and Maria Grothe De Lemos of Holstein, was an architect. He graduated with honors from the Berlin Royal Academy of Buildings, and was famous for his designs in three countries, Germany, Mexico, and the United States. In 1881, de Lemos left Germany and settled in New York, where he married Margaretta Becker and had a daughter, Marie Katherine. He died in April 1909 and is interred at Woodlawn Cemetery in the Bronx, New York City.

== Works ==
- 1870s–1881 German Army buildings.
- 1883 Eden Musée (completing for Henry Fernbach, who had died mid-project), New York City, NY
- 1884 De Lemos & Cordes (associated with architect A. W. Cordes).
  - Grand Central Palace, built in 1893 on Lexington Avenue between 43rd and 44th Streets (40.752451°N 73.975296°W) and demolished by 1913 to make way for the Grand Central development after it had served as a temporary station during the construction of Grand Central Terminal.
  - 1894 The Kuhn, Loeb & Co. Bank Building at 27 Pine Street in New York City (40.707485°N 74.009893°W)
  - 1901–1902 Macy's Herald Square department store, between 151 West and 34th Streets in Manhattan, New York City (40°45′1″N 73°59′18″W); added to the National Register of Historic Places as a National Historic Landmark in 1978.
  - Arion Club House, between 59th Street and Park Avenue in New York City (40.706981°N 74.00959°W)
  - Siegel-Cooper Company department store, at the corner of West 19th Street and Sixth Avenue in New York City (40.74069°N 73.99465°W)
  - New York County National Bank building.
  - Speyer & Co. Bank building.
- Mutual Life Insurance Company of New York building in Mexico City, Mexico.
- Boker building in Mexico City, Mexico.
