= New York Production Services =

New York Production Services (NYPS) is a production company that was founded in 1999 by John Grossman. They produce feature films, commercials and television shows. NYPS currently has several feature films and TV productions in development.

== History ==
Founded in 1999 by Executive Producer John Grossman, NYPS began as a commercial production service company for ad agency creatives and fashion photographers. NYPS later grew to service the independent film industry as well as several television networks. Today NYPS is noted for its work on global campaigns for top fashion, beauty, retail, and luxury lifestyle brands.

== John Grossman ==
John Grossman has worked in the advertising and film industries for over 30 years on numerous feature films, commercials, documentaries, and television productions. In 1998, he started The Firm, a fashion and beauty production company. Later on, John joined forces with agency executive Neal Werner to create TheFirm Creative Group, which was an in-house ad agency and production company. TheFirm Creative Group finally evolved into New York Production Services. Since then, John has completed over 1,000 commercials and continues to develop feature-length films and television series.
