= Studio V Architecture =

Architecture firm in New York City

- Type: Private
- Industry: architecture design, real estate
- Founded: 2006
- Founder: Jay Valgora
- Headquarters: New York City, New York, U.S.
- Services: Architecture design and planning
- Website: www.studiov.com

Studio V Architecture, styled as STUDIO V Architecture, founded in 2006, is a New York City-based architecture and planning firm led by Jay Valgora. The firm executes projects across New York and throughout the tri-state region. Studio V has been highlighted for its adaptive reuse design of important New York City sites, including the $400 million renovation of Macy's Herald Square, named by Architectural Record the largest retail project in North America in 2012 and 2013, and the Empire Stores on the Brooklyn waterfront.

Among Studio V's awards are the Light & Architecture Design Award by Architectural Lighting, the New York Design Award for Best Commercial Project, the Illuminating Engineering Society of New York's Lumen Award, and the Award for Best Store Design of the Year in 2014 by design:retail magazine.

The firm's work has been highlighted by national and regional institutions, including the American Planning Association, American Institute of Architects, Urban Land Institute, The Architect's Newspaper, Municipal Art Society, Metropolitan Waterfront Alliance, and the Rubin Museum of Art.

== Principal background ==
Valgora was born in the early 1960s in Buffalo, New York. He received his Bachelor of Architecture degree from Cornell University in Ithaca, New York and a Master of Architecture degree from Harvard Graduate School of Design in Cambridge, Massachusetts, and was a Fulbright Fellow to the United Kingdom. Back in the United States, Valgora worked as a Senior Designer for Koetter Kim & Associates, and moved on to be Design Director at Rockwell Group. After taking a subsequent role as Design Principal at Walker Group/CNI, Valgora opened his own Manhattan-based firm, STUDIO V Architecture, in 2006.

Valgora's work through his own firm has focused on the transformation of New York's waterfront, and the validation of the East River as the city's “Next Central Park.” He is leading a team to design the Empire Stores on the Brooklyn waterfront, which will transform seven abandoned warehouses into a mixed-use tech campus with deployable barrier walls in the event of a superstorm. Valgora has also been working for four years to create the master plan for Astoria Cove, a waterfront community in Queens.

== Selected projects ==
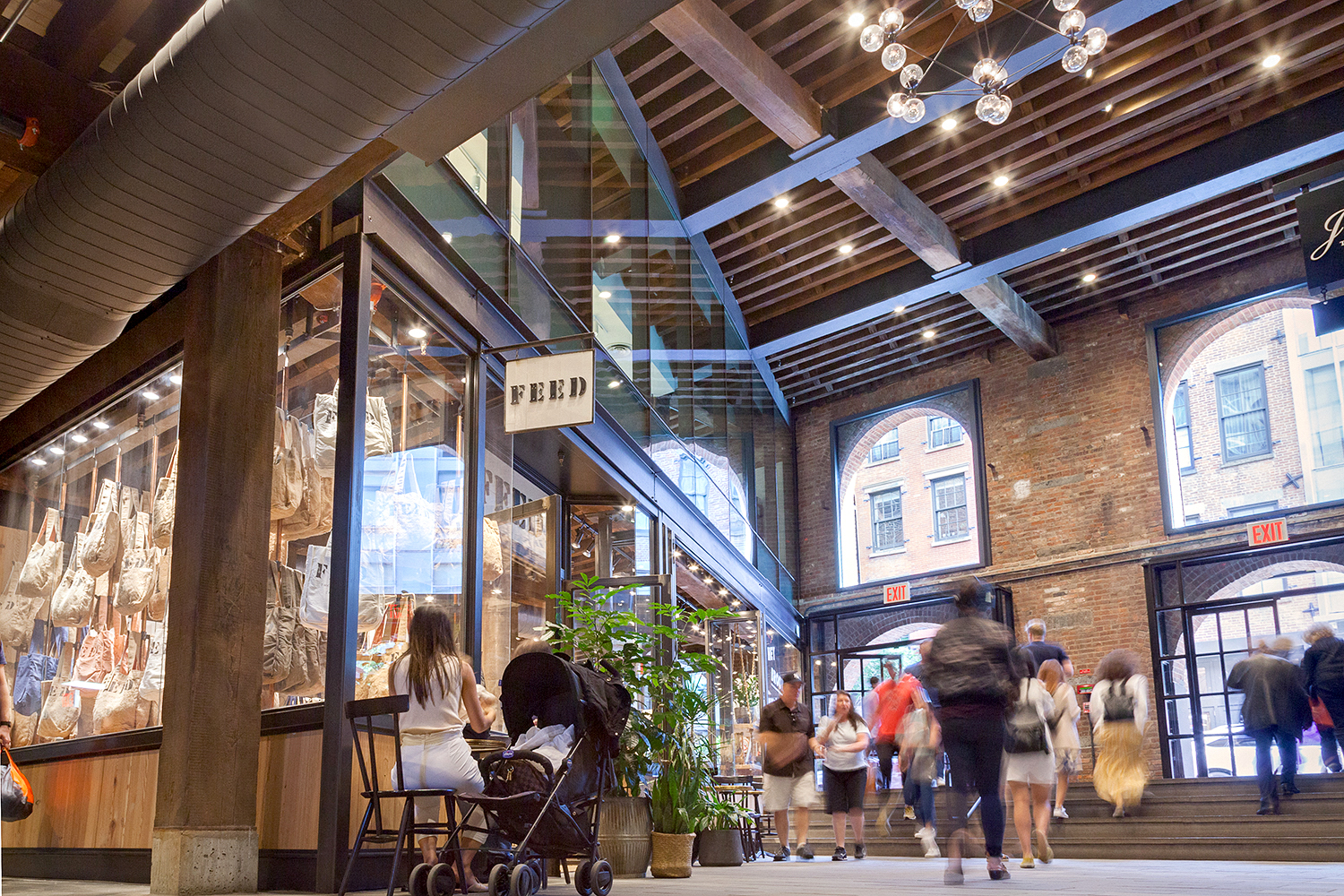
Studio V Architecture converted Empire Stores, the previously abandoned Civil War-era coffeehouse in the Dumbo section of Brooklyn into a mixed-use development consisting of office, commercial, and retail space.

- Halletts Point Master Plan in Queens, New York
- Astoria Cove Master Plan in Queens, New York
- Macy's Herald Square Master Plan Renovation in New York City
- Stella 34 Trattoria in New York City
- Empire City Casino at Yonkers Raceway in Yonkers, New York
- Empire Stores in Brooklyn
- Foxwoods Resort Casino Retail Concourse in Mashantucket, Connecticut
