= New York County National Bank Building =

Building in Manhattan, New York

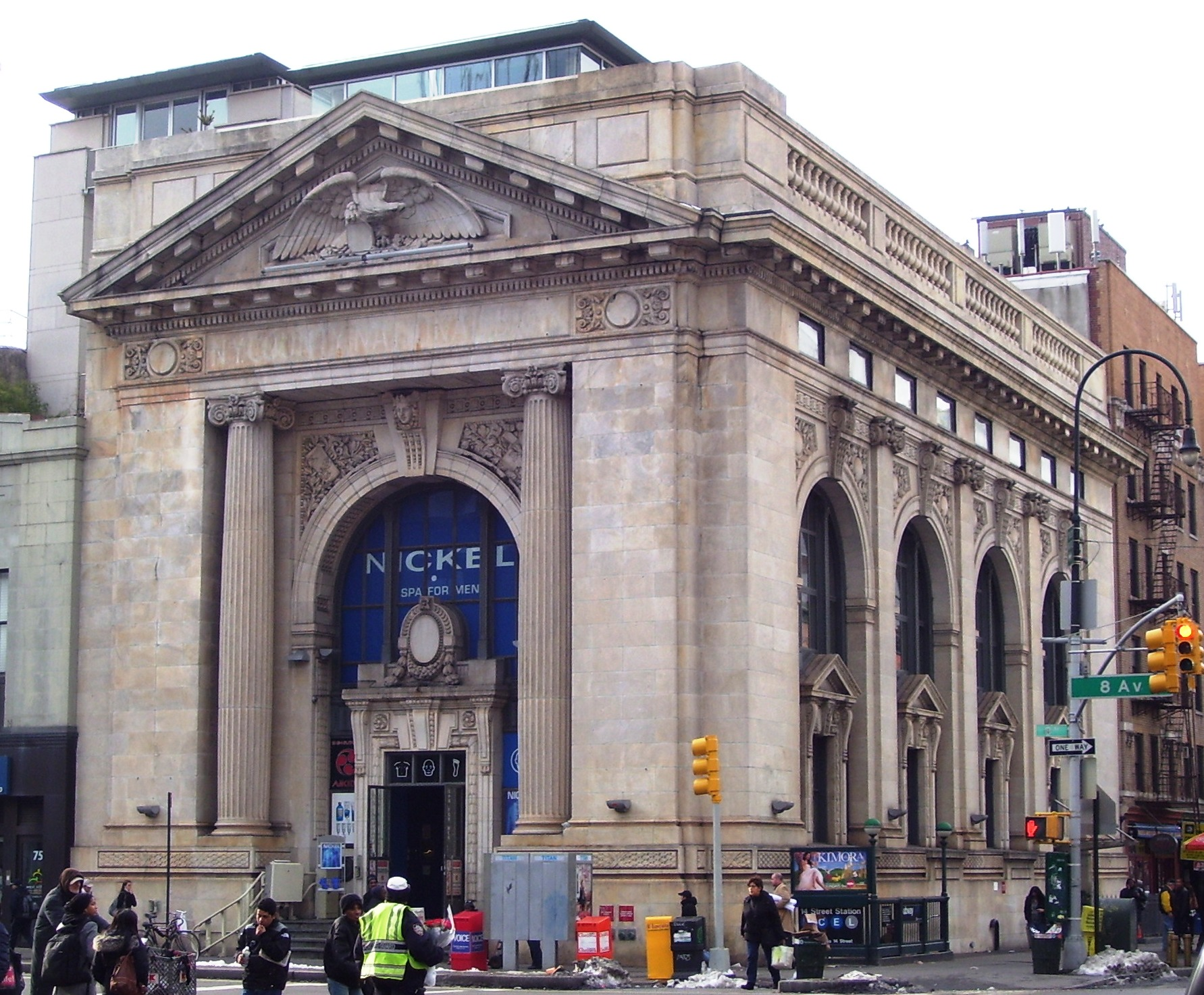
- (2011)
- Interactive map of the New York County National Bank Building area
- Alternative names: Manufacturers Hanover Trust Bank Building

General information
- Architectural style: Neoclassical
- Coordinates: 40°44′23″N 74°00′10″W
- Construction started: 1906
- Completed: 1907

Design and construction
- Architects: De Lemos & Cordes; Rudolphe L. Daus

The New York County National Bank Building at 77–79 Eighth Avenue at West 14th Street in the Greenwich Village neighborhood of Manhattan, New York City – also known as the Manufacturers Hanover Trust Company Building – was built in 1906–07 and was designed by De Lemos & Cordes and Rudolphe L. Daus in the Neoclassical style. A seven-story addition to the south of the building at 75 Eighth Avenue was constructed in 1926. Renovations and a further addition in 1999 were by Lee Harris of the Hudson River Studios and John Reimnitz and mimic the original architecture.

On June 7, 1988, the building was designated a New York City landmark by the New York City Landmark Preservation Commission. It was originally designated under the name "Manufacturers Hanover Trust Company Building".

Since it ceased being used as a bank, the building at 77-79 Eighth Avenue had interior alterations, and has been the location of an Off-Broadway theater, a men's gym, and a museum. As of 2018, the building houses the Museum of Illusions.

== History ==
The New York County National Bank was founded in 1855, and by 1877 occupied the lot at the southwest corner of Eighth Avenue and 14th Street. In February 1905, it bought the adjacent lot at 77 Eighth Avenue from John Jacob Astor, which contained a three-story printing house.

=== Use as bank ===
Construction of a new bank building could not begin until the printing house's lease expired in 1906. The bank commissioned De Lemos and Cordes to design their new building. Preliminary plans released in February 1906 show that the building would have been eight stories high, with the bank occupying the two lowest stories. By the time papers were filed with the city, the building was to be one story with an attic, and De Lemos and Cordes had brought in Rudolphe L. Daus on the project. Daus filed plans for a bank building on the site that April; it was planned to cost $250,000 and was to be made of Dover marble.

R. H. Robertson's Neoclassical New York Savings Bank had already been erected in 1886 across 14th Street from the site, and may have been an influence in the scale and design of the new building, although classical forms were, at the time, widely used for banks throughout the United States, as "temples of commerce". The City Beautiful movement also played a part in the choice of neoclassical design which, together with Robertson's bank, created a compatible ensemble for the intersection.

In 1921, the New York County National Bank merged with Chatham and Phenix National Bank, and the building on Eighth Avenue became Chatham and Phenix's twelfth branch. That bank merged with Metropolitan Trust Company in 1924, forming the Chatham-Phenix National Bank and Trust Company. This institution was bought in 1932 by Manufacturers Trust Company, which later became Manufacturers Hanover Trust Company (MHT), which continued to use the building as a branch bank. It is under this name that the building was designated a New York City landmark. In 1991, MHT merged with the Chemical Banking Corporation, which eventually became part of Chase Bank.

=== Later use ===
Laura Bohn and her husband Richard Fiore acquired the building in the late 1990s and proposed adding residences to the building. The 14th Street Development Corporation spent $6 million to convert the building into a mixed-use structure called the Bank Building. The project was designed by architecture firms John Reimnitz Architect and Hudson River Studios. The lower floors of the building were converted into a 499-seat Off-Broadway theater, occupying 5,000 square feet (460 m^{2}) on the ground level and 4,000 square feet (370 m^{2}) in the basement. Eleven apartments (most of them duplexes), ranging from 1,500 to 3,800 square feet (140 to 350 m^{2}), were built on the upper stories. To accommodate the apartments, a two-story penthouse was added to the original building, and four stories were added to the annex on Eighth Avenue. The roof above the original building was lowered by several feet, and the penthouse was set back from the street to comply with landmarks regulations.

The building's conversion into a theater and condominiums took place amid the neighborhood's ongoing gentrification. During the renovation, the 14th Street Development Corporation erected a temporary construction wall in front of the building; owners of nearby stores complained that the wall negatively impacted their businesses.

A men's spa, Nickel, was operating on the lower stories by 2004. Although many wealthy people had expressed interest in the building's condominiums, few were willing to live there because the surrounding neighborhood was still rundown. As a result, most of the apartments were used as pieds-à-terre until the early 2010s, when the opening of the High Line and nearby boutiques increased the neighborhood's fashionability. The Museum of Illusions opened in the New York County National Bank Building in September 2018.

== Architects ==
De Lemos & Cordes, the partnership of German natives Theodore W. De Lemos and August W. Cordes, was formed in 1884, and was responsible for designing a number of significant retail and commercial buildings in New York, including the Siegel-Cooper Dry Goods Store (1895); the Adams Dry Good Store (1900), executed in the Beaux-Arts style; the Macy's Department Store of 1901, an "over-scaled Renaissance style palazzo"; and the 1893 Fulton Building, in which both they and Rudolphe L. Daus had offices. In 1903, they designed a bank building at 24 Pine Street for Speyer & Company, which received positive critical reception, and may have led to the commission to design the New York County National Bank Building.

Rudolphe L. Daus, Mexican-born and educated in New York, Berlin, and Paris, was an 1879 graduate of the École des Beaux Arts and was the recipient of a number of awards and prizes for excellence in architecture. He worked as an assistant to Richard M. Hunt before opening his own office in Brooklyn in 1884, which moved to the Flatiron Building in 1896, although his practice remained primarily in Brooklyn. He designed both residences – in the Romanesque Revival and Queen Anne styles – and public buildings such as the Lincoln Club in 1889, the Thirteenth Regiment Armory in 1891, and a number of Brooklyn Public Library branches.

There is no record of any other collaboration between De Lemos & Cordes and Daus, although both had offices at 130 Fulton Street at the time. The plans and designs for the New York County National Bank Building are ambiguously signed, so it is not possible to who was responsible for the building's design and to what extent.

== Architecture ==
The building has a concrete base and brick foundations. The roof is flat. The supporting structure consists of steel columns and reinforced interior columns. The building's facade is rubbed South Dover marble, which has in the past been painted to match the stone's original color. The Eighth Avenue entrance has a pedimented entrance portico which has two corner piers and two fluted Ionic columns. The steps were originally flanked by two bronze lamps which have since been removed. The pediment itself features a monumental eagle with its wings spread and its neck swooping downward, a change from the original design, in which the bird's head was to be raised. The side facade features caduceuses, a symbol of commerce.

== Gallery ==
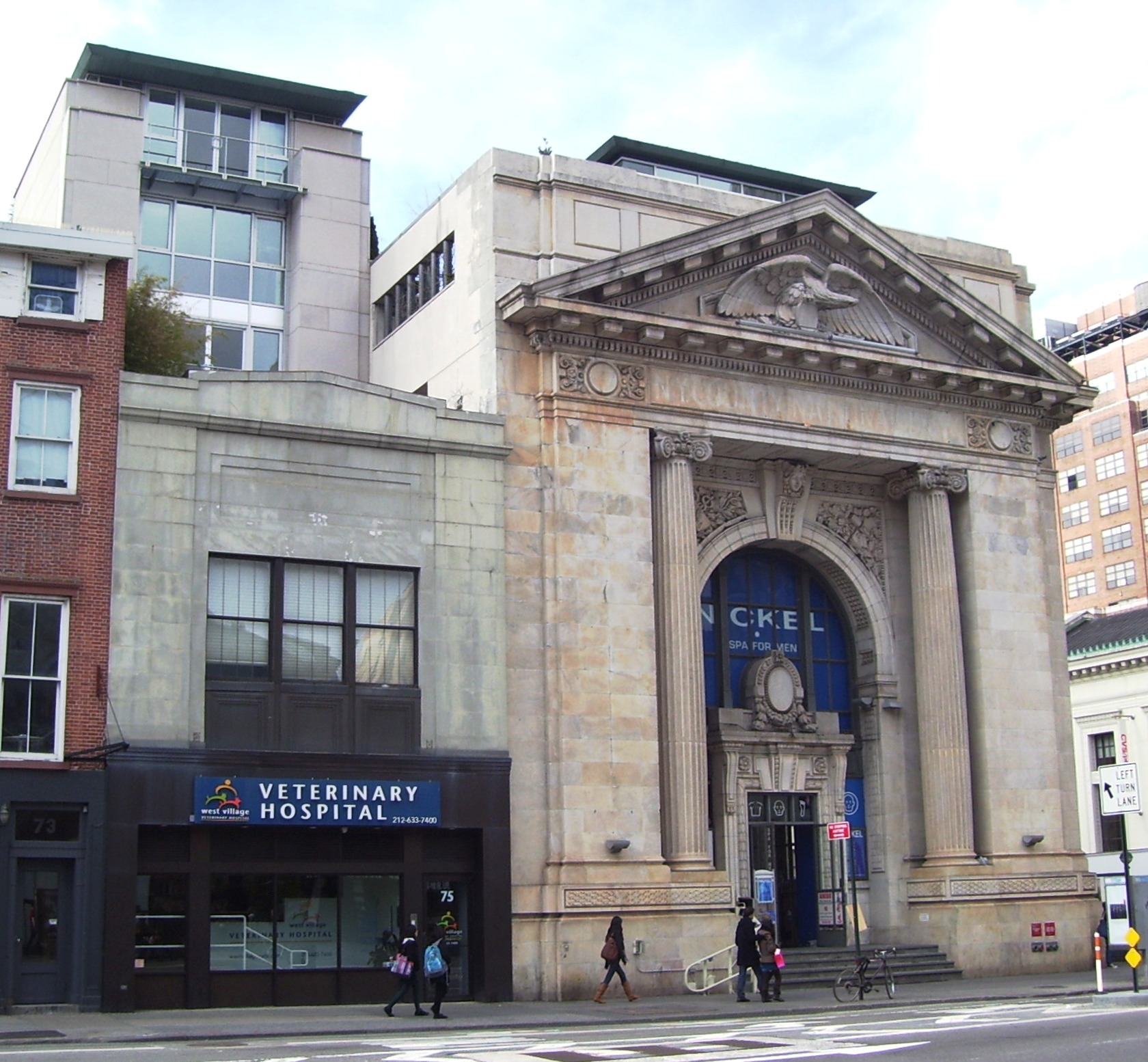
The building, including the addition at 75 Eighth Avenue

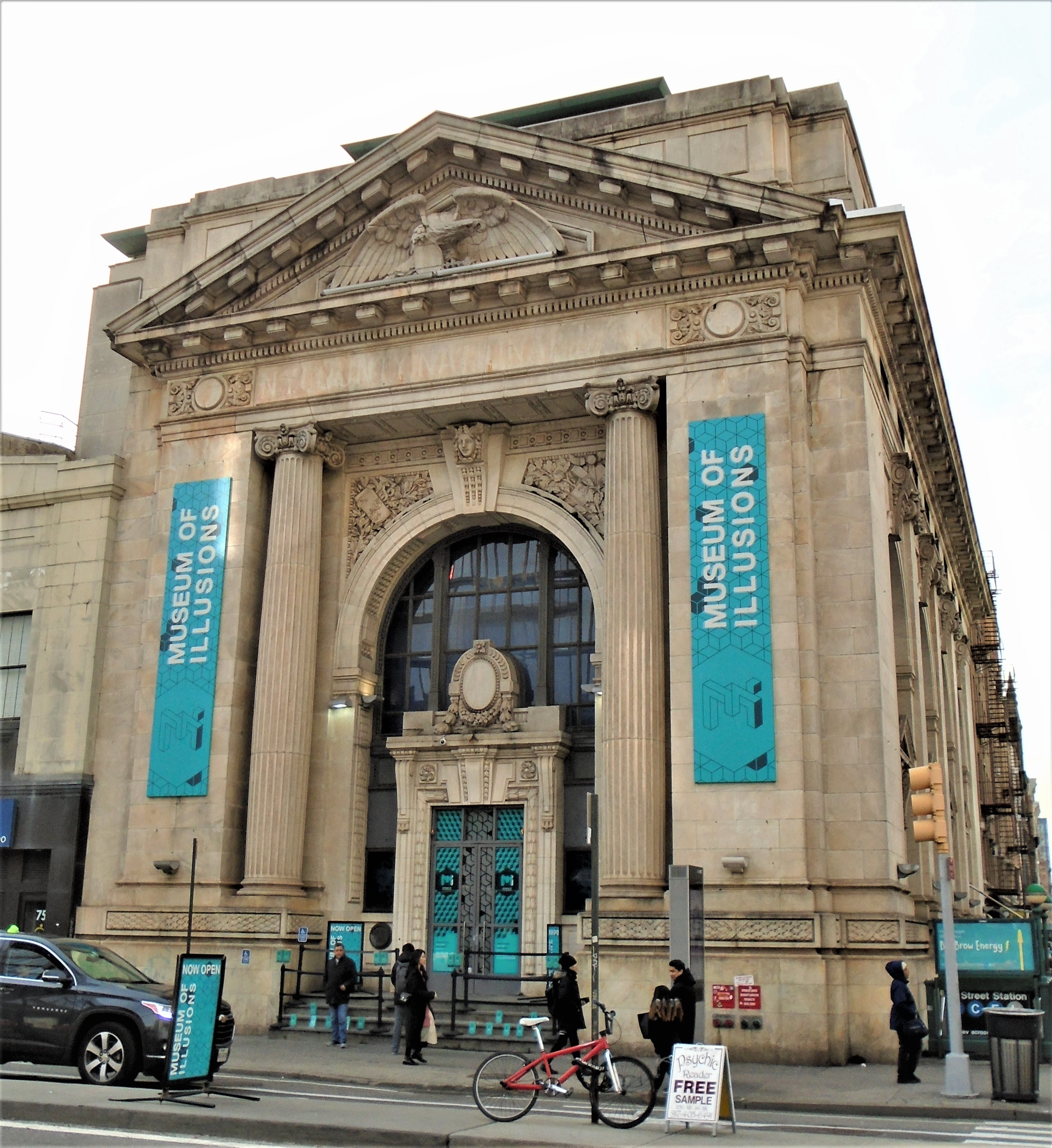
The front facade with banners for the Museum of Illusions (2020)

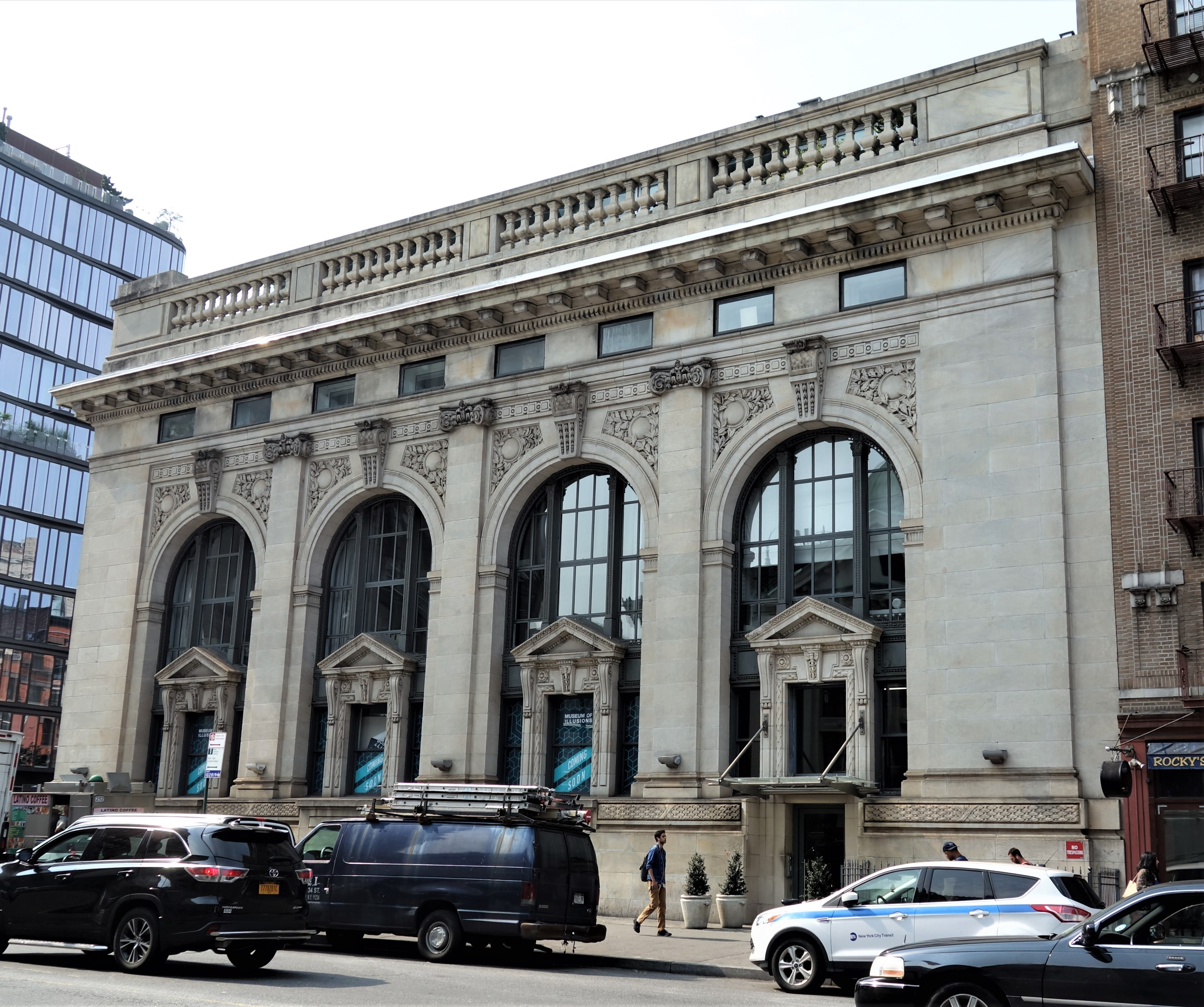
The building's northern facade on 14th Street

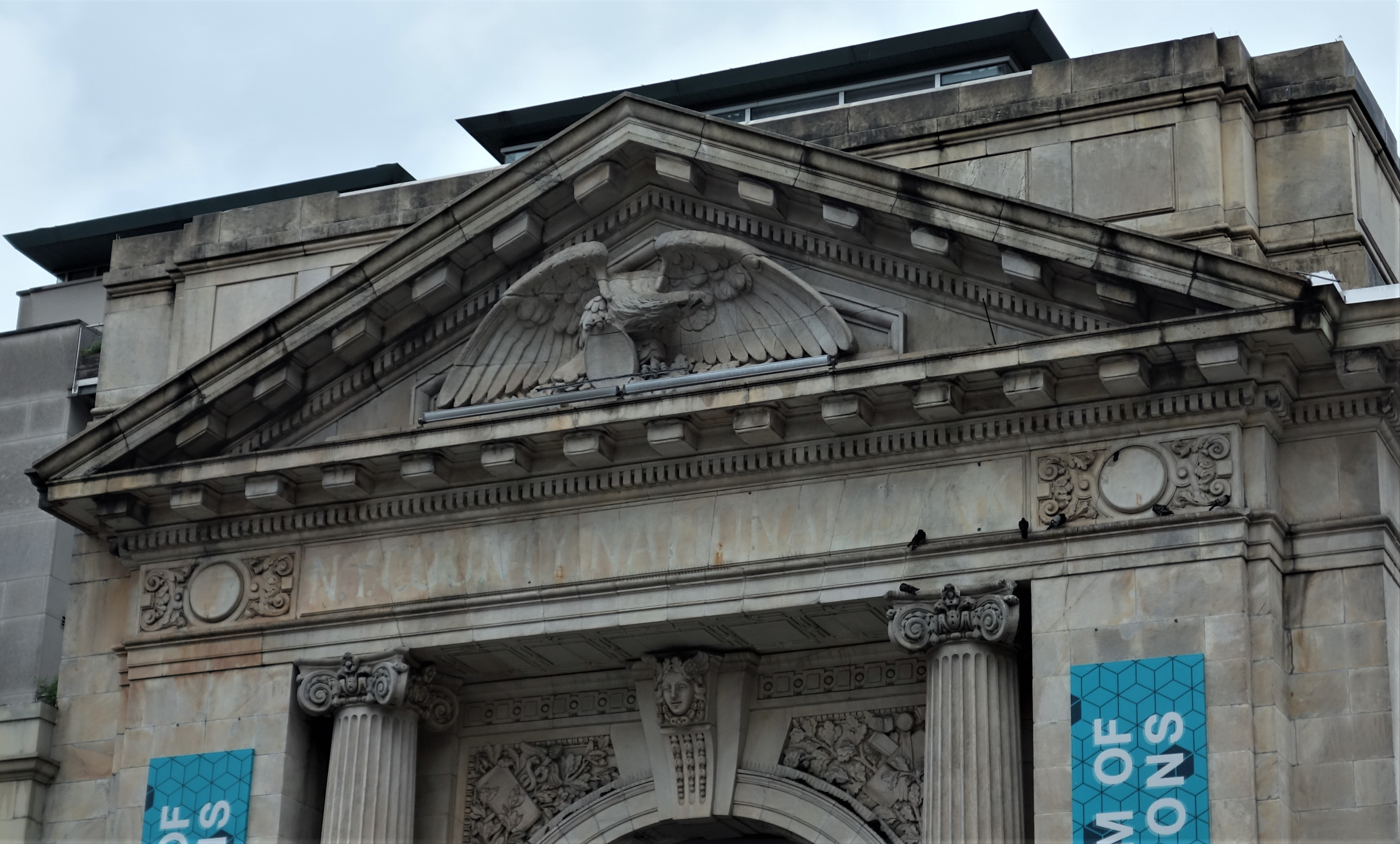
The building's pediment

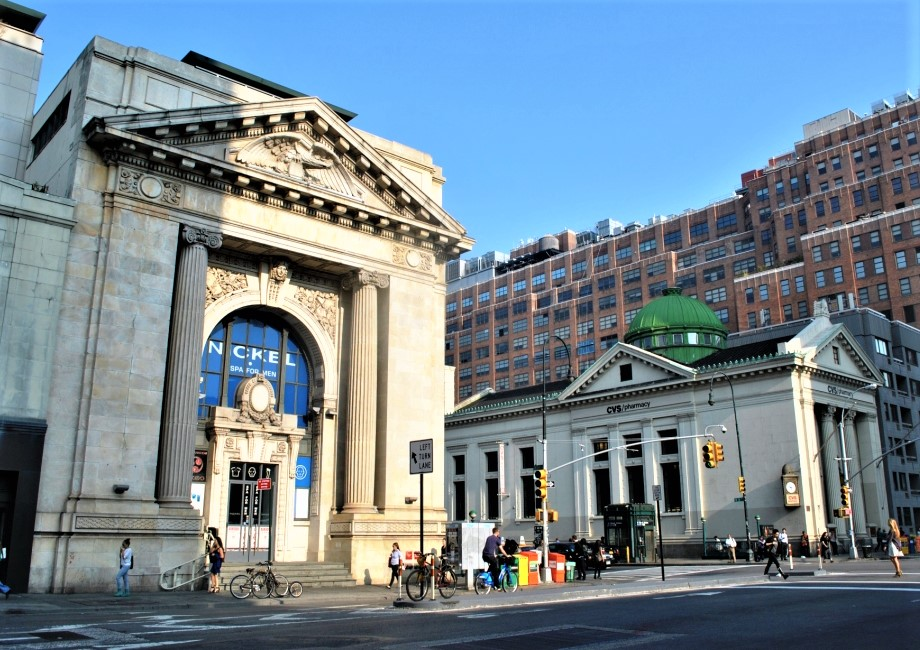
With R. H. Robertson's 1886 New York Savings Bank across 14th Street

== See also ==
- List of New York City Designated Landmarks in Manhattan below 14th Street
