= Bank for Savings in the City of New-York =

First savings bank in New York City (1819–1982)

The Bank for Savings in the City of New-York (1819–1982) was one of the earliest banks in the United States and the first savings bank in New York City. Founded in 1816, it was first advertised as "a bank for the poor". It was merged with the Buffalo Savings Bank in 1982. It failed in 1991 and is no longer in existence.

== History ==
=== Founding ===
The Bank for Savings in the City of New-York was the fourth bank to be opened in the United States and the first savings bank in Manhattan. It was founded in 1816, although it was not incorporated by the New York State Legislature until March 16, 1819. First publicly advertised as "A Bank for the Poor", it was modeled after similar institutions in Europe; its stated purpose was to "effect a secure place of deposit for the earnings of the laboring part of the community: and at the same time to give them the benefit of an accumulation of interest". " One of the bank's founders, Thomas Eddy, explained the charitable impetus behind the entity's formation: "Among the many philanthropic institutions with which your country abounds, there is none that appears to me more likely to be useful than Savings Banks. They are certainly most admirably calculated to be beneficial to the poor, by promoting among them a spirit of independence, economy and industry."

The bank's first location was at Chambers Street. The site became famous as the venue where the first Egyptian mummy was displayed in the United States in 1824. The bank moved to Bleecker Street on April 10, 1856, and became familiarly known as the Bleecker Street Savings Bank.

=== Civil War ===
During the Civil War, the bank was reputed to be a bellwether of the nation's prosperity. It held more than $11 million and boasted the largest number of working-class depositors in New York state. Following a fire that badly damaged the building, the bank moved on August 15, 1894, from Bleecker to 280 Fourth Avenue at 22nd Street . A large white marble Romanesque structure was designed by Cyrus L. W. Eidlitz. Later headquarters were located on Park Avenue South.

=== Merger ===
The Bank for Savings acquired the New York Savings Bank in August 1963, becoming the New York Bank for Savings. The merger allowed the combined bank to open more branches, as savings banks in New York were typically limited to five branches, but savings banks created from the merger of multiple banks were allowed to have as many branches as their predecessors did. The New York Bank for Savings was allowed to have 10 branches, and its tenth branch opened in 1966.

=== Notable directors ===
Among its founders and first directors were Thomas Eddy, William Bayard Jr., DeWitt Clinton, Archibald Gracie, Cadwallader D. Colden, John Pintard, Matthew Clarkson, Peter Augustus Jay and Brockholst Livingston. Although many credit Eddy with founding the institution, Bayard served as the bank's first president. Other famous directors included Frederic James de Peyster, a prominent soldier and philanthropist; and politician Hamilton Fish, who stepped down from the board when he became U.S. Secretary of State.

=== Demise ===
It merged with the Buffalo Savings Bank in 1982 and its name was subsequently changed to Goldome. It failed in 1991, along with a number of other banks, and is no longer in existence.
