= Rudolphe L. Daus =

American architect

- Born: 1854; Mexico
- Died: 1916 (aged 61–62); Paris, France
- Occupation: architect
- Known for: buildings and libraries
- Notable work: see Works section
- Awards: Fellow, American Institute of Architects

Rudolphe Lawrence Daus (Note: Given names also spelled Rudolph and Laurence, and sometimes cited as R. L. Daus) (1854–1916) was an American architect based in Brooklyn, New York City. He designed the 13th Regiment Armory in Brooklyn, now the Pamoja House for homeless men, and the Lincoln Club. He also designed several libraries. He was a Fellow of the American Institute of Architects.

Daus was born in Mexico to a German Catholic family of Jewish descent and studied in Europe before working for Richard Morris Hunt and George B. Post. He established his own firm in 1884.

Carl Westman worked at his firm, as did Fay Kellogg at the start of her career. Daus died in Paris in 1916.

== Works ==
- 203 - 209 Prospect Place (circa 1885) between Carlton and Vanderbilt Avenues in the Prospect Heights neighborhood of Brooklyn
- 13th Regiment Armory, Brooklyn
- Lincoln Club (1886), 65 Putnam Avenue in Brooklyn
- 176 & 178 St. John's Place in Park Slope
- New York and New Jersey Telephone and Telegraph building (1898) at 81 Willoughby Street (also known as 119-127 Lawrence Street) in Brooklyn on the list of New York City Designated Landmarks in Brooklyn
- New York County National Bank Building (1907)

== Gallery ==
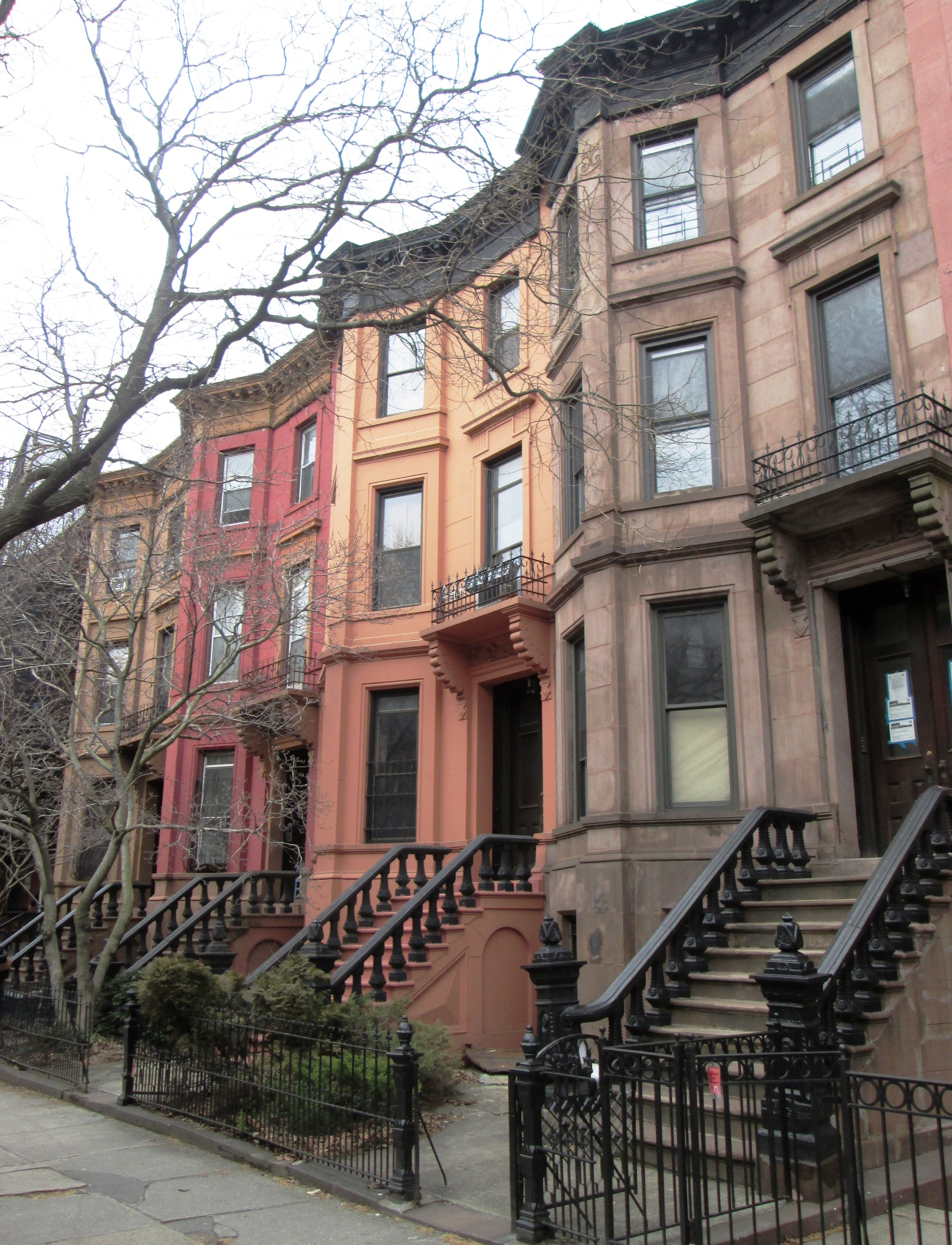
203 - 209 Prospect Place row houses in Prospect Heights

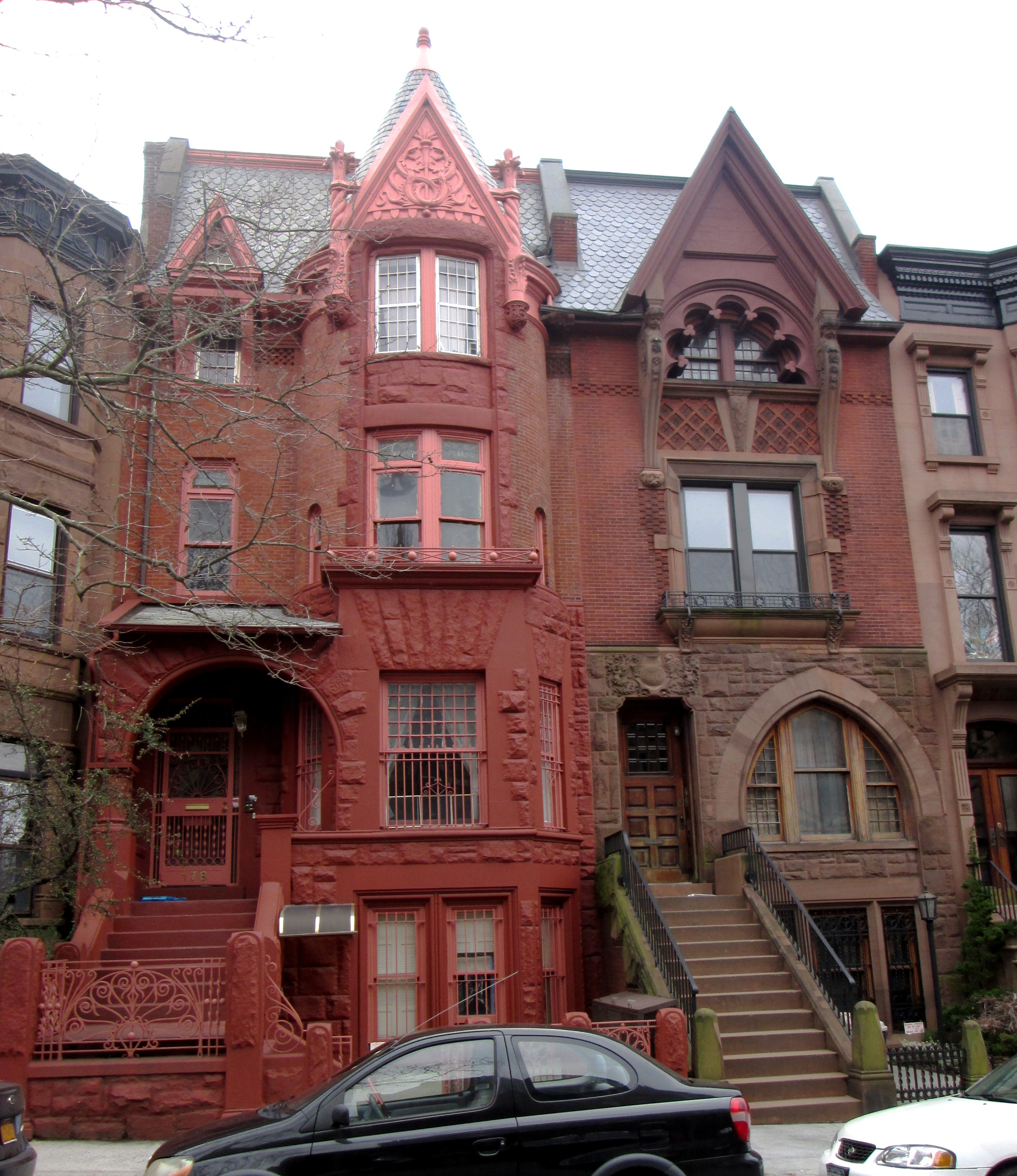
176 and 178 St. John's Place in Park Slope

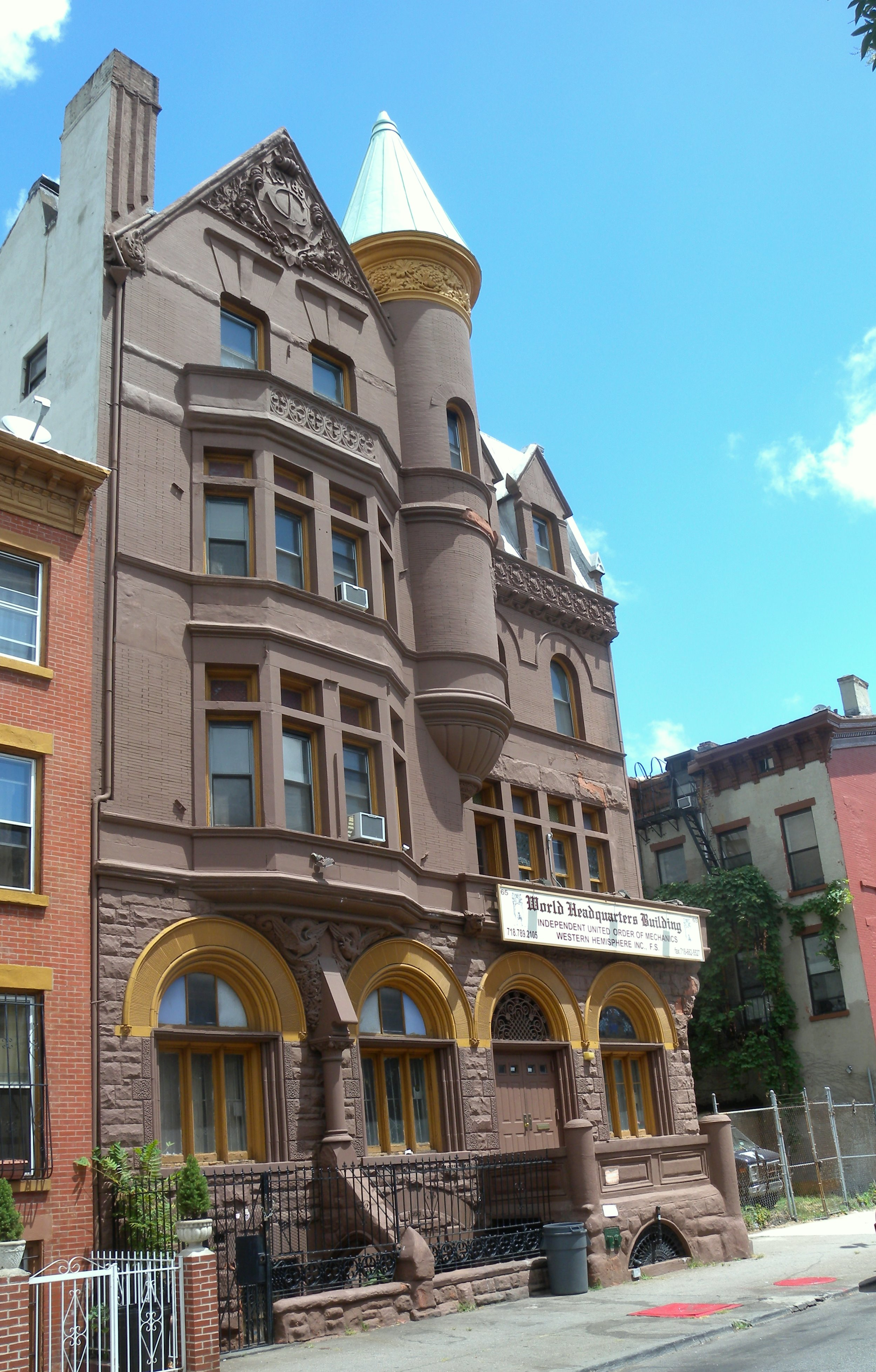
Lincoln Club

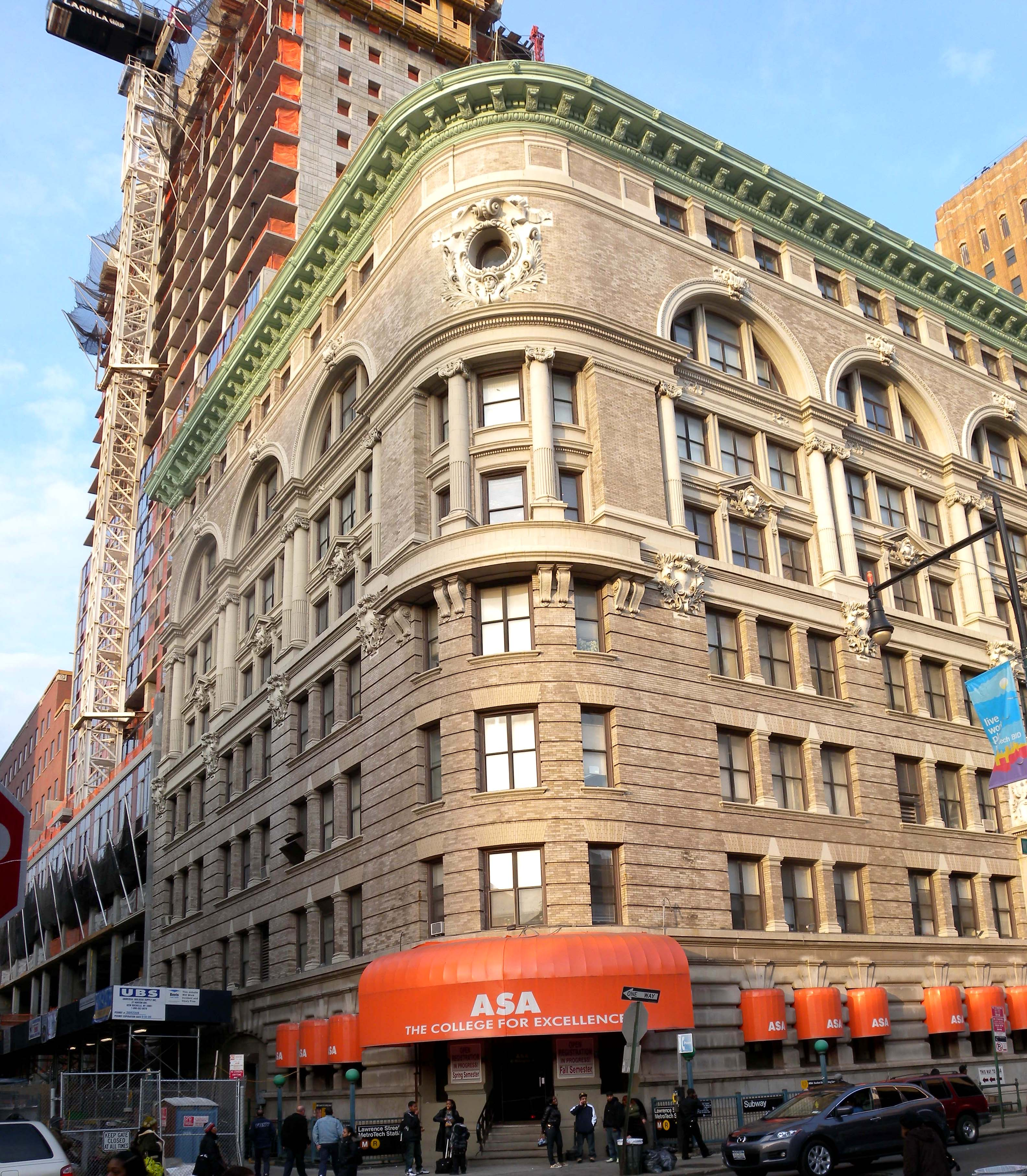
New York and New Jersey Telephone and Telegraph Building in Brooklyn
