= Thomas Eddy =

American politician and philanthropist

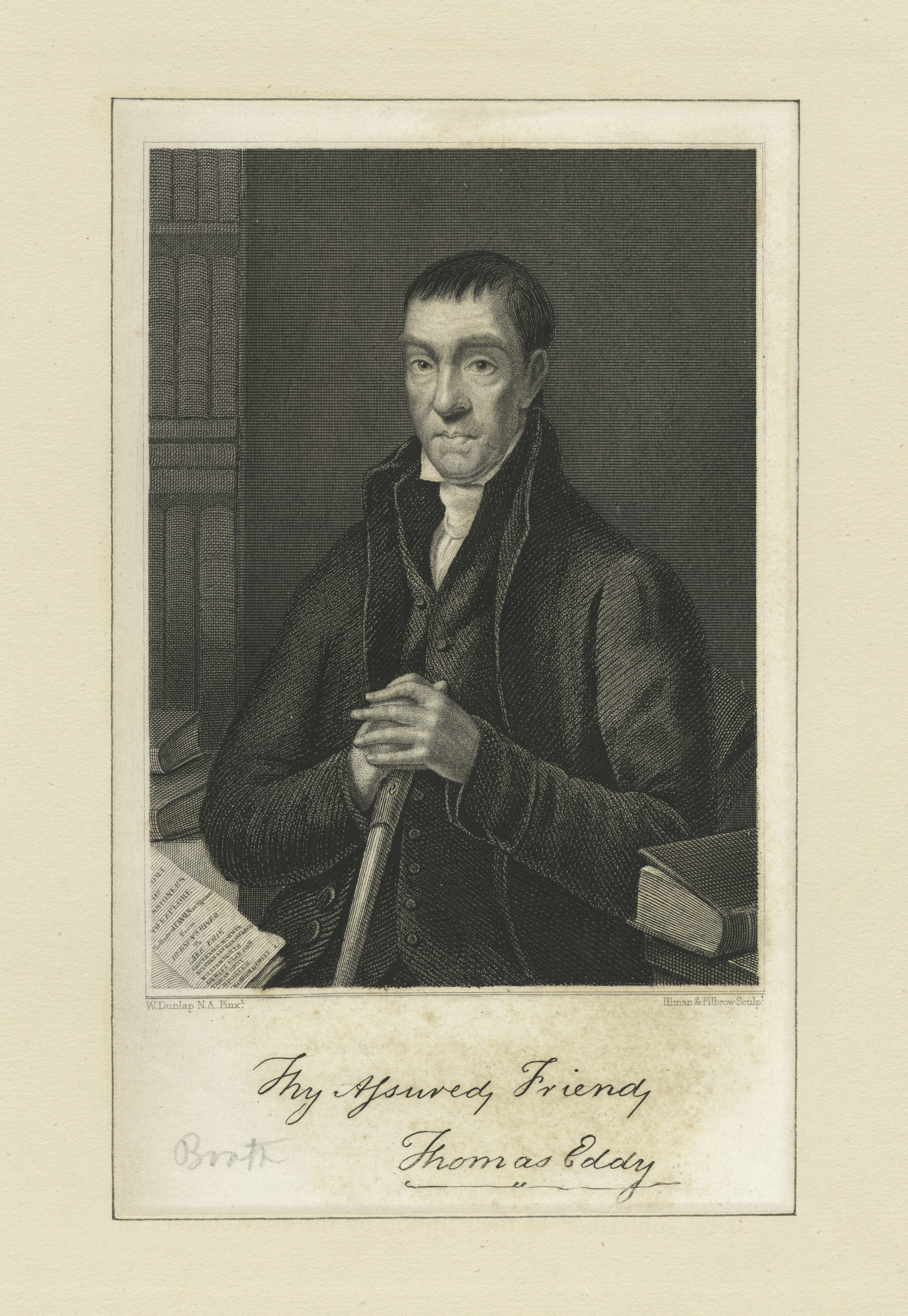
Print of Thomas Eddy, ca. 1886

Thomas Eddy (September 5, 1758, Philadelphia, Pennsylvania - September 16, 1827, New York City) was an American merchant, banker, philanthropist and politician from New York.

== Early life ==
He was the son of Irish Quaker immigrants who had come to America about five years prior to his birth. His father was engaged in the shipping business until 1766 when he went into hardware, but died later the same year. A few years later, the family moved to Bucks County, Pennsylvania. When thirteen years old, Eddy was apprenticed to learn the tanning business in Burlington, New Jersey but remained there only two years.

== Business career ==
In September 1779, Eddy removed to New York City, and became a merchant, dealing mostly in imported goods which were shipped from England and Ireland by his brother Charles. In 1781, he earned a large amount by the remittance of money from the British headquarters in New York.

In 1782, Eddy married Hannah Hartshorne at New York City. Afterward, he returned to Philadelphia and formed a partnership with his brother George. In the wake of the commercial crisis in the middle of the 1780s, he and his brothers George and Charles went bankrupt. He removed to New York City again, and became the first insurance broker there, and later an underwriter, speculating in public funds. He became thus a director of the Mutual Insurance Company, and the Western Inland Lock Navigation Company. In 1803, he was one of the founders of the New York Savings Bank.

== Political career ==
Eddy had been engaged in charitable work, was elected a governor of the New York Hospital in 1793, and became interested in the reform of the penal laws. He lobbied for inmate labor and solitary confinement in place of other forms of punishment such as hanging.. In 1796, Eddy helped State Senators Philip Schuyler and Ambrose Spencer to draft a bill which established the penitentiary system. The bill was passed and Eddy was appointed to the Commission which put it in practice. He was chosen to oversee the construction of the first State Prison, located in Greenwich Village, better known as the old "Newgate" Prison, and became its first Director, from 1797 to 1801. He also urged the State Legislature to build facilities for the mentally ill.

== Erie Canal ==
In 1797, Eddy was appointed Treasurer of the Western Inland Lock Navigation Company, which had been established in 1792 with the purpose of developing a navigable route up the Mohawk River to Lake Ontario. When he found his company in financial trouble, he drew upon the idea first proposed by Joshua Forman (member of the New York State Assembly from Onondaga County in 1808) of building a canal, rather than trying to navigate the rivers. He turned to his friend Jonas Platt, then a State Senator and leader of the Federalists in New York, and the two of them decided to propose the creation of a Commission to explore two possible routes of a canal – either to Lake Ontario or to Lake Erie. They would report their findings to the New York State Legislature after their expedition to the west. On March 13, 1810, Platt presented his project for a bipartisan Canal Commission to the State Legislature, and received overwhelming support, and Eddy was appointed one of the Commissioners. The Erie Canal was eventually opened in 1825.

== Sources ==
- Bio in Lives of American Merchants by Freeman Hunt (Derby & Jackson, New York, 1858; pages 329ff)
- "Newgate" Prison, at Correctional History
- The New York Civil List compiled by Franklin Benjamin Hough (page 40; Weed, Parsons and Co., 1858)
