= Fay Kellogg =

American architect

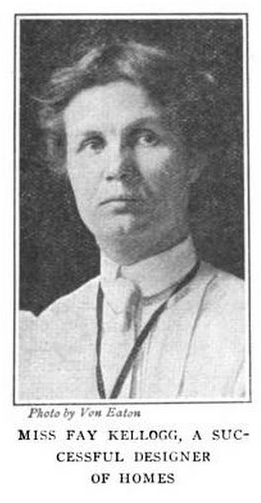
- Fay Kellogg, from a 1908 publication.
- Born: May 13, 1871; Milton, Pennsylvania
- Died: July 10, 1918 (aged 47); Brooklyn, New York
- Occupation: Architect

Fay Kellogg (May 13, 1871 – July 10, 1918) was described as "the foremost woman architect in the United States" in the early years of the 20th century. She specialized in steel construction.

== Education and early career ==
Kellogg was born in Milton, Pennsylvania, the daughter of Albert H. Kellogg. Originally intending to become a doctor, she began studies at Columbian University, now George Washington University, in Washington, D.C. She switched to architecture at her father's urging. She said she had always been handy with tools, and had wanted to build a home for herself, a goal which she eventually realized. She began studying with a German tutor for two years, from whom she learned drawing and mathematics, and then studied for a year at the Pratt Institute in Brooklyn.

She obtained employment with Rudolphe L. Daus, where she worked on projects such as the 13th Regiment Armory and the Monastery of the Precious Blood. She then worked at the architectural firm of Carrere and Hastings for one year, after which she went to Paris to study at the atelier of Marcel de Monclos. At the time, women were not admitted to the École des Beaux-Arts, and Kellogg vigorously fought for the admission of women to that school during her two years in Paris. She was ultimately successful but too late to avail herself of the opportunity to attend.

== Independent professional ==
Upon returning to the United States in 1900, she found work with the established New York architect John R. Thomas, where she helped design or prepare plans for the Hall of Records. She designed the prominent double staircase in that building's atrium and she said it was her idea to place statues of early Dutch governors like Peter Stuyvesant on the building so that they would look out over the modern city. After Thomas's death in 1901, Kellogg set up business for herself, establishing her own office in 1903.

One of her first commissions was the renovation and construction of seven buildings on Park Place in Manhattan for the American News Company. She was soon in charge of all their building and renovation work in the United States. For jobs within 200 miles of New York City, Kellogg would supervise directly. For projects further afield, she would draw plans.

Kellogg also helped design the Woman's Memorial Hospital in Brooklyn, founded by female physicians in 1881, as well as hundreds of other buildings and cottages. She designed suburban railway stations, and was the architect for a real estate developer on Long Island. She erected a skyscraper in San Francisco. Unafraid to think big or to personally oversee her projects, Kellogg once happily conducted an interview while swaying on a beam nine stories above New York on one of her buildings under construction. She told the terrified reporter, "I don't think a woman architect ought to be satisfied with small pieces, but launch out into business buildings. That is where money and name are made. I don't approve of a well-equipped woman creeping along; let her leap ahead as men do. All she needs is courage".

During World War I, Kellogg built YWCA National War Council "hostess houses" at military camps in Greenville, South Carolina; Charlotte, North Carolina; Chattanooga, Tennessee; and a YWCA building at the Charleston Navy Yard.

== Opposing sexism ==
Kellogg played a role in opening the architecture profession to women. Unable to attend the Ecole des Beaux Arts because of her sex, she advocated admission of women to the prestigious academy during her residence in Paris. In part due to her efforts, the French government passed a bill to allow women to study there, although it came too late for Kellogg herself to attend. Architect Julia Morgan received a certificate 1902.

Kellogg said her relationships with male architects were good: "I do not permit sentiment to enter into it whatever. I meet them on equal lines". She said women were well suited to be architects, and "as is the case with all pioneers, the women who have gone into architecture are intensely in earnest". She said she refused concessions from male colleagues when offered: "I want to be treated neither as a superior nor as an inferior, but as an equal".

Kellogg was also a supporter of women's suffrage. During an address by the English suffragist Mrs. Pankhurst at Carnegie Hall in 1909, Kellogg was the only architect among dozens of professional women seated on the stage.

== Personal life ==
Kellogg owned a 15-acre (6.1 ha) farm on Long Island, where she spent six months of the year, and from which she sold eggs year round. She was reclaiming the "waste land" with the intent of eventually retiring there. Kellogg was described as a small, well-dressed woman with blue eyes. She was also athletic, participating in fencing, boxing, wrestling and equestrian activities, as well as playing basketball and golf.

Kellogg became ill in Atlanta, Georgia in the spring of 1918 while supervising construction of YWCA hostess houses at Camp Gordon, and died in July 1918 at her home in Brooklyn, New York, aged 47.

== Bibliography ==
- Fay Kellogg. "Women as Builders of Homes," Southern Architect and Building News, vol. 29, June 1912, pp. 18–20

== See also ==
- Women in architecture
