= 23rd Regiment Armory =

Armory in Brooklyn, New York

- U.S. National Register of Historic Places
- New York City Landmark
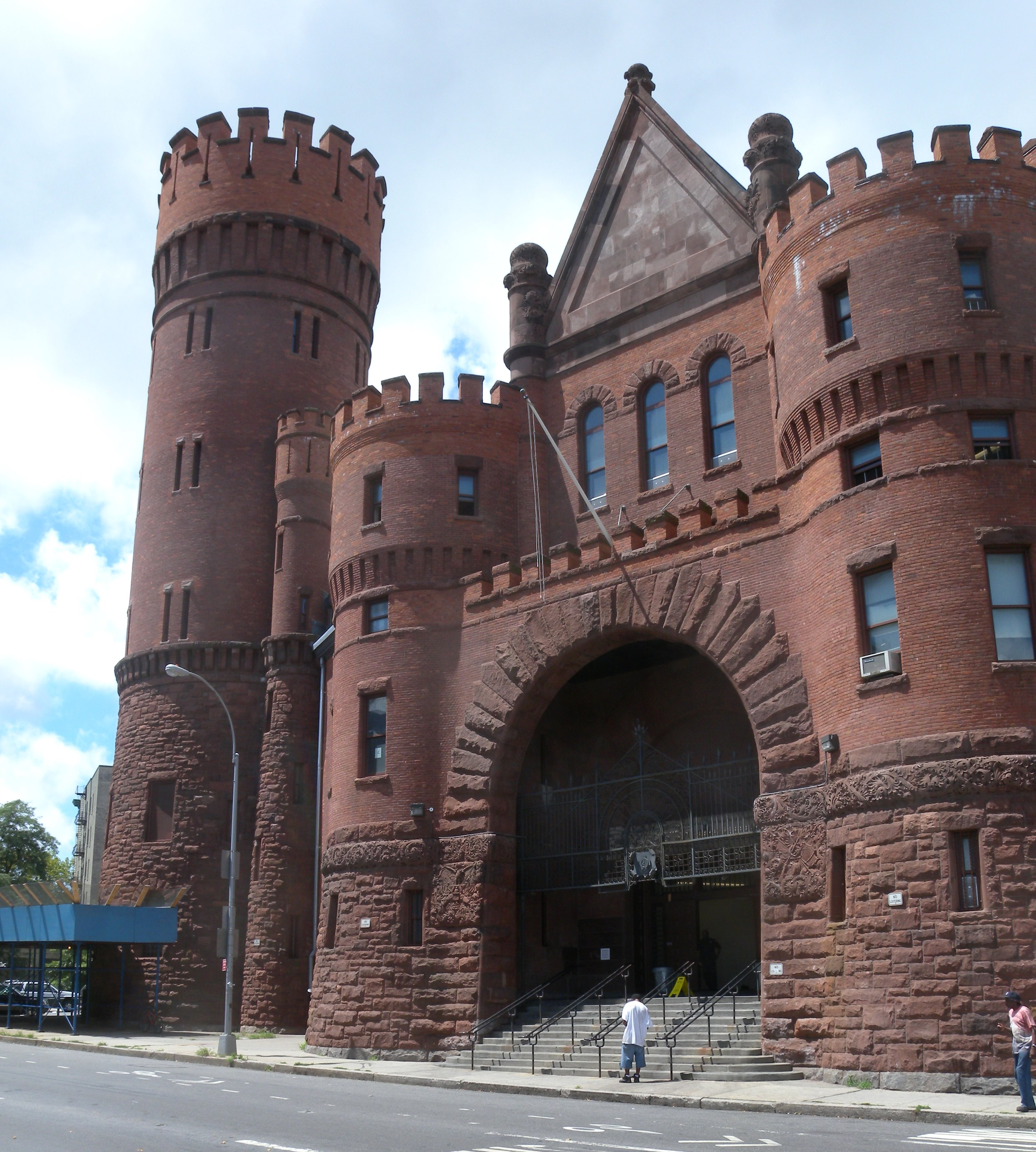
- (July 2010)

- Location within New York City Location within New York Location within the United States
- Location: 1322 Bedford Ave., Brooklyn, New York, US
- Coordinates: 40°40′43″N 73°57′16″W
- Area: 2.3 acres (0.93 ha)
- Built: 1891–95
- Architects: Fowler & Hough and Isaac Perry
- Architectural style: Romanesque Revival
- NRHP reference No.: 80002641
- NYCL No.: 0950

Significant dates
- Added to NRHP: May 6, 1980
- Designated NYCL: March 8, 1977

The 23rd Regiment Armory, also known as the Bedford Atlantic Armory, is a historic National Guard armory building located at 1322 Bedford Avenue between Atlantic Avenue and Pacific Street in the Crown Heights neighborhood of Brooklyn, New York City, United States. The building is a brick and stone castle-like structure designed to be reminiscent of medieval military structures in Europe. It was built in 1891–1895 and was designed in the Romanesque Revival style by Fowler & Hough, local Brooklyn architects, and Isaac Perry, the New York state government's architect.

The structure was originally built for the 23rd Regiment of the New York State Militia. Since the 1980s, it has been in use as a men's homeless shelter, though in the 2010s, there were plans to redevelop the armory.

The building was designated a New York City landmark in 1977, and was listed on the National Register of Historic Places in 1980.

== History ==
=== Planning ===
The 23rd Regiment of the New York State Militia was organized in 1861 as a relief guard of the 13th Regiment. It was meant to take over the duties of the Brooklyn City Guard, which at the time was participating in the American Civil War. The Relief Guard, later known as the City Guard Reserve, was mustered-in as the 23rd Regiment in 1862, and participated in the Civil War for one month in 1863. Concerns about the readiness of volunteer militia led to the passage of an "Armory Law" in 1862, during the Civil War, which called for the construction of armories statewide. However, the effort stagnated after the end of the war. The 23rd Regiment then moved to an armory on 165–179 Clermont Avenue in Fort Greene, which was built in 1872–1873. The still-extant building, which now includes apartments, contained windows with pointed arches and a tall mansard roof.

The regiment soon outgrew the Clermont Avenue location, and started looking for a location to build a new armory. Halstead P. Fowler, of local architecture firm Fowler & Hough, was selected as the new armory's architect. Fowler, a 23rd Regiment member, designed the building under the supervision of state architect Isaac Perry. Another armory architect, John N. Partridge, was also part of the 23rd Regiment. In June 1889, Partridge requested a $350,000 appropriation from the New York State Commission for the construction of the new armory. That August, a site was selected at the southwest corner of Bedford Avenue and Atlantic Avenue. At the time, the land was occupied by the St. Bartholomew's School, as well as two farmhouses and a rowhouse. The rowhouse belonged to H.P. Fowler, a principal at Fowler & Hough.

=== Construction and use as armory ===
A budget appropriation of $300,000 was given for construction, and plans for the 23rd Regiment Armory were finalized in 1890. The ceremonial cornerstone-laying event was held on November 14, 1891. Soon after, the costs of building the armory increased greatly, and by 1892 another $100,000 was being requested for the 23rd Regiment Armory's completion. Another $50,000 was requested in May 1893. The New York Times described the armory as one of three Brooklyn armories facing extreme cost overruns, the others being the 13th Regiment Armory in Bedford–Stuyvesant and the 14th Regiment Armory in Park Slope. In 1894, during construction, the building's flagpole shattered in a lightning storm.

On November 4, 1894, the 23rd Regiment marched to its new armory to signify that it had taken possession of the building, and the Clermont armory was sold shortly thereafter. On November 15, the regiment started a two-week fundraiser to collect money for furnishings, and raised almost $70,000 for said purpose. The new 23rd Regiment Armory was not completed until 1895, and the drill room was not completed until 1902. The total cost of the armory was $550,000, almost twice the original budget, though this figure also included the funds spent on furnishings. A World War I memorial outside the armory was dedicated in 1922.

In 1923, the building was rented by William Randolph Hearst for use as studio space for his Cosmopolitan Productions after the company's own facilities were destroyed by a fire on February 19, 1923. The 23rd Regiment Armory also housed the 106th Infantry until the 1980s, when the New York National Guard vacated the premises. In addition to military use, the 23rd Regiment Armory was used by various exhibits, including home shows and car shows; as well as various sporting events such as cycling and school sports.

=== Conversion into a homeless shelter ===
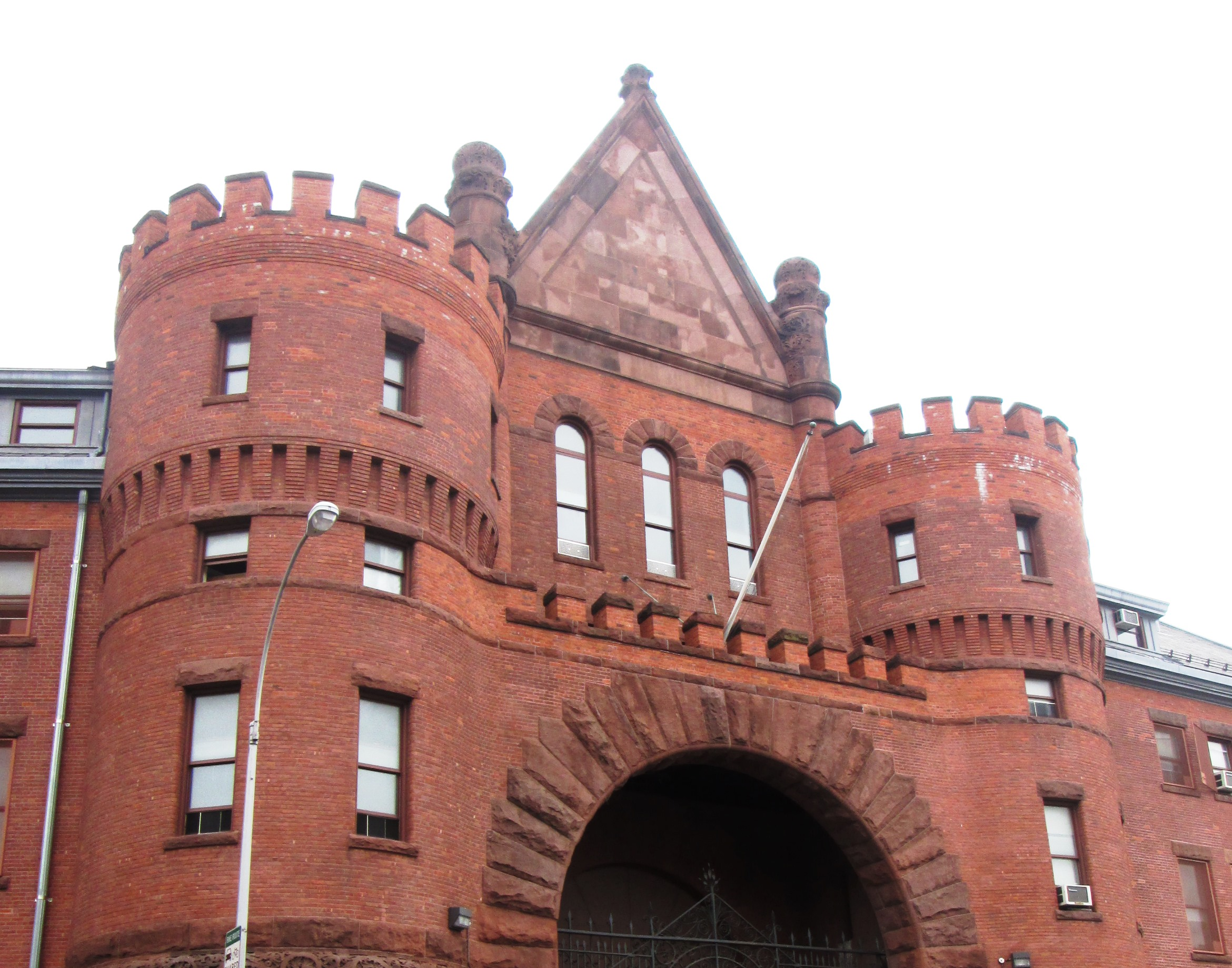
Bedford Avenue facade

The city converted the building into the Bedford-Atlantic Shelter, a 500-bed men's homeless shelter, in 1982. The shelter, operated by the New York City Department of Homeless Services (DHS), is nicknamed "Castle Grayskull" by the homeless and locals, in reference to the armory's castle-like appearance. The Bedford-Atlantic Shelter was one of 19 shelters built around the city during the 1980s; by 1987, it had 532 beds accommodating 800 men. Following a 1992 lawsuit brought by community members seeking to close the 23rd Regiment and Fort Washington Armory shelters, the city agreed to decrease the Bedford-Atlantic Shelter's capacity. By 2002, the shelter had been downsized to 350 beds. The shelter still contained 350 beds by 2017, making it the city's largest homeless shelter to house exclusively men.

In addition to housing homeless men, the shelter serves as a DHS intake center, performing evaluations for homeless people, who are then sent to other shelters or treatment programs. Plans to use the 23rd Regiment Armory for this purpose were first announced in 2008 upon the planned closure of an existing intake center at Bellevue Hospital in Manhattan, which would make the armory the city's only DHS intake center. Following controversy over these plans, a second intake center was later announced for Manhattan. A New York City Police Department training facility is also located in the armory, and teaches new officers security procedures at New York City homeless shelters.

The Bedford-Atlantic Shelter is known as Brooklyn's most dangerous shelter and one of the most dangerous in the New York City shelter system. Since the 1980s, it had received a reputation for tolerating use of illegal drugs. A 2018 analysis found that in 2017, there had been 89 arrests at the shelter, and police had been called 865 times, or over twice a day. Many of these arrests were drug-related. Workers and residents also made allegations of a rat infestation at the shelter in 2018.

=== Proposed redevelopment ===
The 23rd Regiment Armory was proposed for redevelopment in 2012 at a cost of $14 million. Several developers submitted suggestions for alternate uses of the drill hall, including as a climbing facility, concert auditorium, or ice-skating rink. However, plans for the renovation of the 23rd Regiment Armory stalled in 2015. By 2017, there was still no progress on the armory's renovation.

== Architecture ==
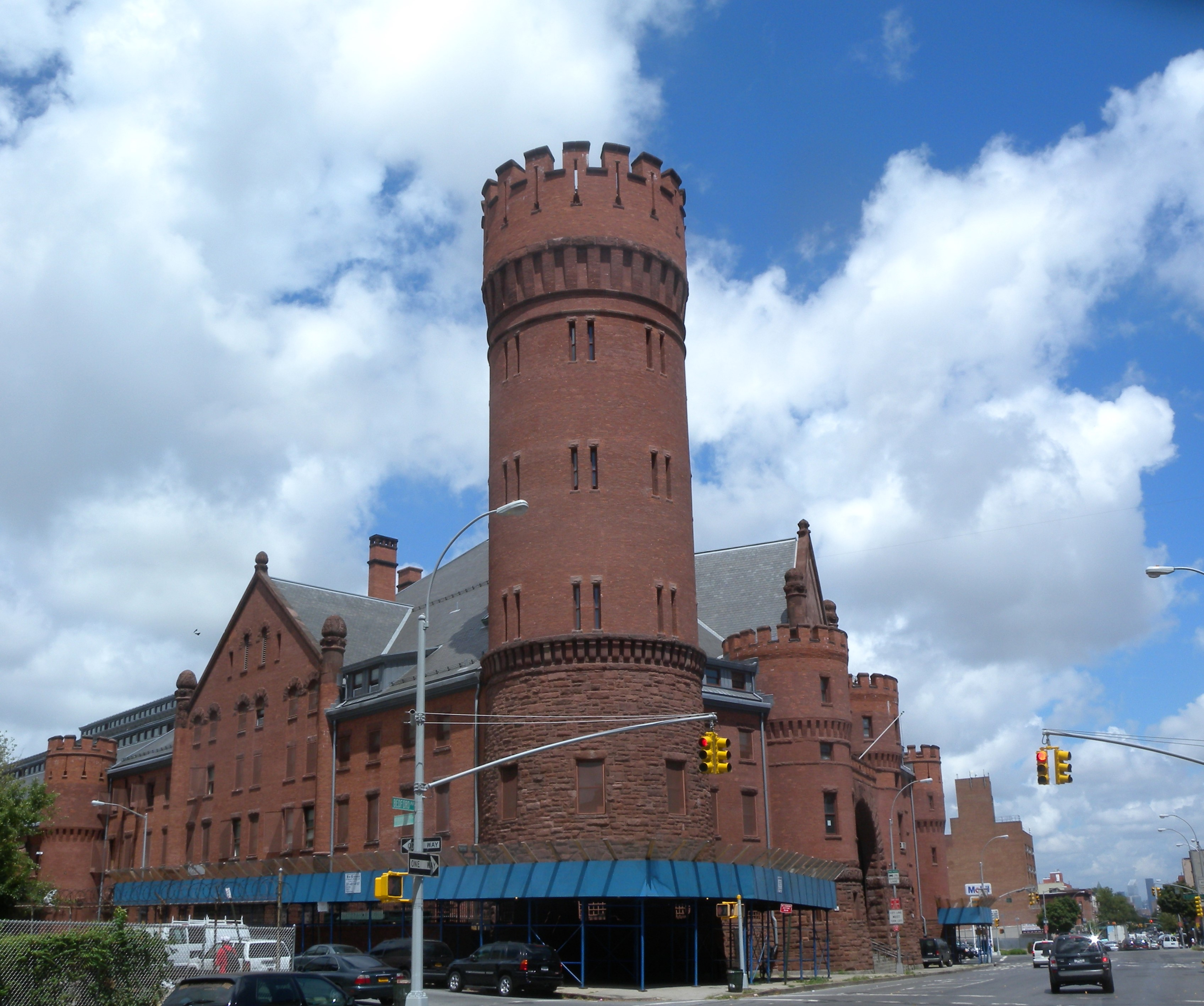
Viewed from Bedford Avenue and Pacific Street

The 23rd Regiment Armory consists of a three-story administration building, facing Bedford Avenue to the east, with an attached drill shed to the west. It features a series of circular corner towers, the tallest of which is 136 feet in height. Upon the 23rd, 13th and 14th Regiment Armories' completions in the mid-1890s, the New-York Tribune stated that "these three armories are the product of a lavish expenditure ... for the support and encouragement of the militia that has perhaps never been excelled."

The 23rd Regiment Armory is located on a trapezoidal lot. As a result, the northern facade on Atlantic Avenue measures 460 feet (140 m) while the parallel southern facade on Pacific Street measures 500 feet (150 m). The armory takes up the entire 200-foot (61 m) width of the block between Atlantic Avenue and Pacific Street, the length of the western facade. The eastern facade on Bedford Avenue measures 230 feet (70 m). The administration building takes up 200 feet (61 m) on the eastern portion of the site, while the drill room occupies the 300 feet (91 m) on the western part of the site.

=== Exterior ===
The facade features deep red pressed brick, brownish red Potsdam stone, and red terra cotta detail. On the first floor facade are courses of ashlar. The general design of the facade is meant to be imposing rather than inviting. Eight circular towers are located on the exterior, the tallest of which is 136 feet (41 m) tall. Of these, there is one tower at each corner of the armory; one each along the Atlantic Avenue and Pacific Street facades, at the points separating the administration building and drill hall; and two flanking the main entrance on Bedford Avenue. The southeastern corner tower, at Bedford Avenue and Pacific Street, is accompanied by a smaller round tower. The Pacific Street side to the south is located on slightly higher ground than the Atlantic Avenue side to the north.

The administration building's Bedford Avenue facade consists of a central entrance bay with gables, and a two-story-tall round-arched sally port with a steel portcullis that drops from the top of the arch. There are friezes directly above the sally port, as well as three tall, narrow arched windows on the floor directly above the sally port. Flanking either side of the sally port are two 3-story-tall architectural bays, with two columns of windows in each bay. The first-floor windows contain round arches while the second-and-third floor windows are rectangular. There are also rectangular, quarter-size window openings from the basement. The wall on the right-hand (northern) side of the entrance includes a bronze plaque commemorating those who fought in World War I, which was dedicated in 1922.

The administration building's Pacific Street facade contains seven bays, with similar window design to the Bedford Avenue facade. Each bay contains two arched windows on the first floor, and two rectangular windows on the second and third floors. The center three bays are five stories tall, with a gabled roof on top, and include arched windows on the fourth and fifth floors. The other four bays are only three stories tall. The facade of the drill hall contains ten windowless bays, separated by protruding brick pilasters.

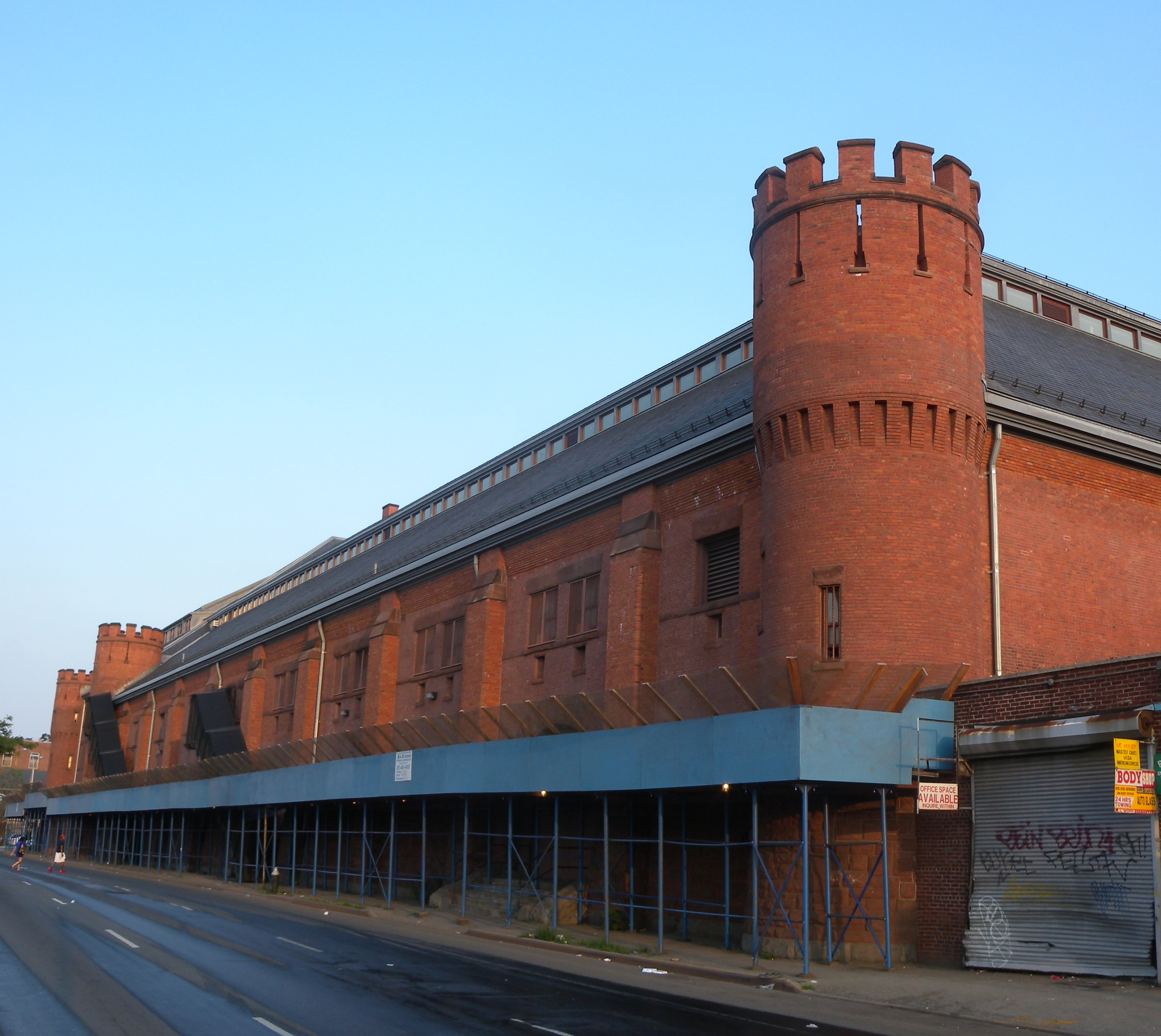
Northwest corner of drill shed, seen from Atlantic Avenue

The Atlantic Avenue facade of the administration building is simpler in design. It contains ten columns of windows, with arched first-floor windows and rectangular second- and third-floor windows. There are also square, half-size window openings from the basement. The drill hall facade along Atlantic Avenue is similar to that on the Pacific Street side, but contains enclosed emergency stairs.

=== Interior ===
The basement was described as being similar to that of the 13th Regiment Armory, with rifle galleries, firing rooms, squad drill rooms, large lavatories, and a bowling alley. One of the largest interior features in the administration building is the Council Room, which contains a fireplace with a mantel that are both 24 feet (7.3 m) high. The July 18, 1897, edition of the Tribune described the room: "Certainly nothing in any other American armory compares and visitors from abroad say they have never seen anything like it." Another article in 1898 stated that the "company rooms are the best in all the armories of the state".

== See also ==
- List of armories and arsenals in New York City and surrounding counties
- List of New York City Designated Landmarks in Brooklyn
- National Register of Historic Places listings in Brooklyn
