= 13th Regiment Armory =

Armory in Brooklyn, New York

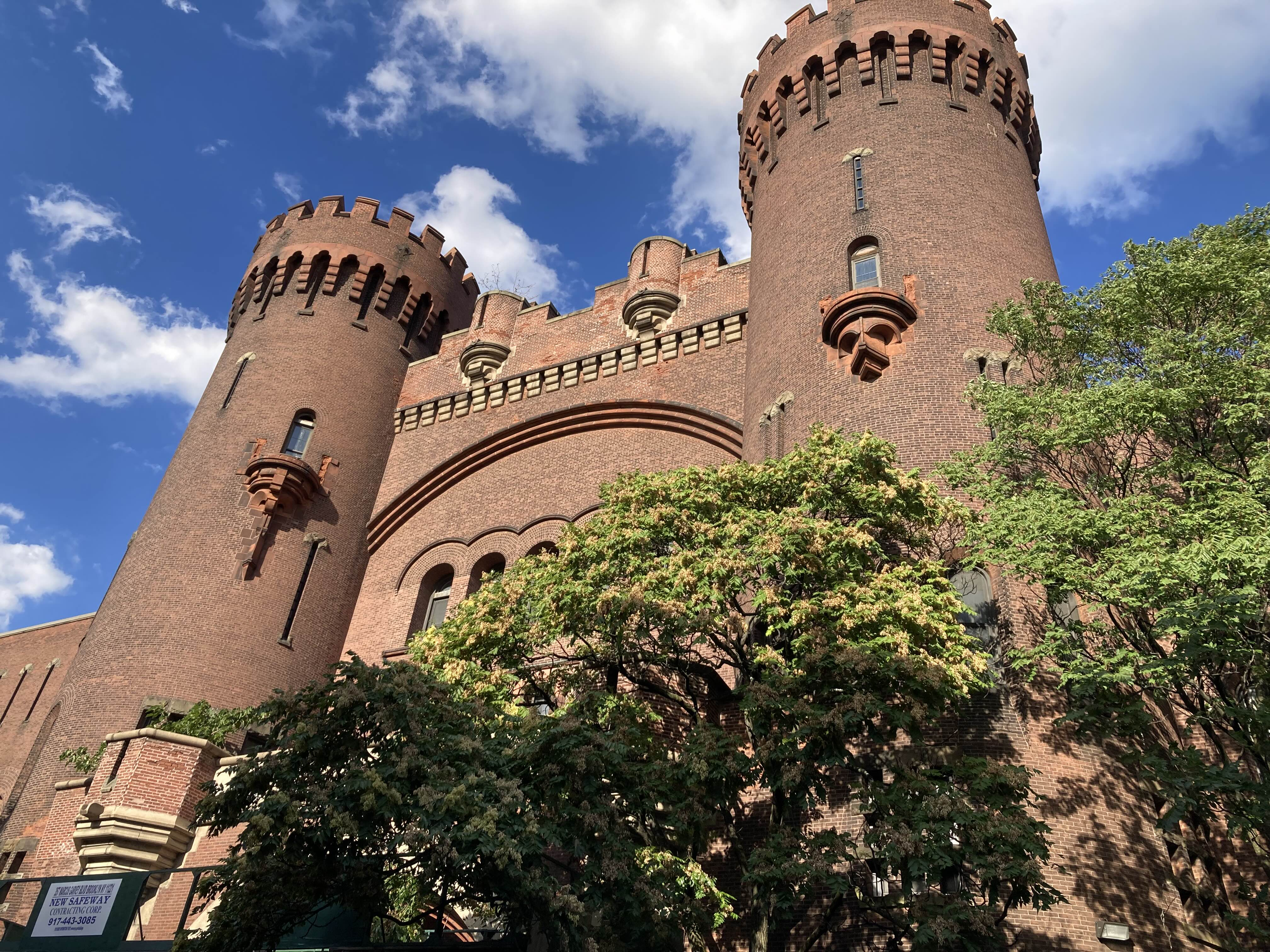
- 13th Regiment Armory, August 2025

General information
- Type: Armory
- Location: 357 Marcus Garvey Blvd, Brooklyn, New York, United States
- Coordinates: 40°41′06″N 73°56′15″W
- Current tenants: Pamoja House
- Construction started: 1892
- Completed: 1894
- Opened: April 23, 1894
- Cost: $26,048,077
- Owner: New York City Department of Homeless Services

Design and construction
- Architect: Rudolphe L. Daus

The 13th Regiment Armory is a historic armory designed by architect Rudolph L. Daus and built in 1892–1894. It is located at 357 Marcus Garvey Boulevard (also known as Sumner Avenue) between Putnam and Jefferson Avenues in the Bedford-Stuyvesant neighborhood of Brooklyn in New York City.

The armory building is currently used as the Pamoja House (also known as Sumner House Shelter Care Center for Men), a homeless shelter for men managed by Black Veterans for Social Justice, Inc. and supervised by the New York City Department of Homeless Services. The Pamoja House is named for the Swahili word for "together".

The armory's design is expansive yet austere. According to Francis Morrone, "Something, perhaps the busy-ness or a greater stridency in the machicolations, makes this armory seem more forbidding than the 23rd Regiment's which is actually rather jolly."

== History ==
=== Previous locations ===
The 13th Regiment was previously housed in Gothic Hall on Adams Street in the 1830s. In 1858, it moved to the Henry Street Armory. and finally to the Flatbush Armory in 1874–75.

=== Construction and use as armory ===
The 13th Regiment had received a $300,000 award for the construction of a new armory in 1890. However, subsequent changes increased the armory's cost to $400,000. The armory ultimately cost nearly $700,000, more than twice its original outlay, which was paid by the Kings County government. The Brooklyn Daily Eagle called the drastic cost increases as "a scandal of no common dimensions", and The New York Times described the armory as one of three Brooklyn armories facing extreme cost overruns, the others being the 14th Regiment Armory in Park Slope and the 23rd Regiment Armory in Crown Heights. A panel of experts recommended cutting several ornate features and downsizing the drill room in order to complete the project within the $300,000 appropriation.

The armory was designed by the architect Rudolph L. Daus. Daus had previously designed the Lincoln Club on Putnam Avenue in 1889. He was probably well-connected politically, as he later became surveyor of buildings for Brooklyn. Plans were worked on also by Fay Kellogg, employed by Daus early in her career.

The armory opened on April 23, 1894. The excessive reallocation of money on the armory's lavish dimensions had resulted in insufficient funding for such items as sidewalks and fences. The budget cuts also resulted in several design deficiencies: for instance, by September 1894, the roof was found to be leaking. Then, in 1903, a wall at the 13th Regiment Armory fell on seven men, killing two of them. Because the drill hall had been downsized as part of the budget cuts, it soon became insufficient for training, and was extended in 1906. The architectural work for this was done by the Parfitt Brothers. In 1921, a large memorial made by L. Riene Co. was erected in the southwest yard with the names of all the soldiers who had been stationed in the armory during World War I, with the casualties listed at the top. Subsequently, a 1944 fire at the armory burned many of the regiment's trophies.

The 13th Regiment Armory was used for several civilian purposes over the years, including as a schools' track and field venue, Sunday school competitions, and singing contests. On June 22–28, 1953, the building was used for the 48th annual session of the Baptist Congress by the Sunday School Congress and Baptist Training Union.

By the mid-20th century, urban armories had become less necessary, and in 1974 the Thirteenth Regiment was deactivated. Plans to close the armory were announced in 1971 as part of a budget cut. A black veterans' group characterized the proposal as racist, since the 13th Regiment Armory was located in a predominantly black and Hispanic neighborhood. A methadone treatment center was proposed for the site in 1972, but that plan was opposed by residents who were concerned about crime increases and wanted more attention to be paid to health, housing, recreation, and schools in Bedford–Stuyvesant.

=== Conversion into homeless shelter ===
After deactivation, the 13th Regiment Armory's headhouse was used to store vehicles while the administration building was used as a school. However, by the 1980s, existing homeless shelters in New York City had become overcrowded, so the city started opening new shelters in armories. Starting in 1987 or 1988, the 13th Regiment Armory was converted for use as a men's homeless shelter, In 1992, a judge ordered that the armory shelter's capacity be cut back from 550 to 200 homeless men. Some residents of the nearby neighborhood did not want the shelter to be opened in the first place, but by 1993, had planted some flowers outside the shelter to beautify it.

According to the Pamoja House's website in 2015, it "specializes in managing a homeless population that was refused from other shelters in New York City and is a 'next-step' facility. Residents of Pamoja House were deemed 'non-compliant' in general population shelters." As a next-step shelter, residents had an 8 PM curfew rather than the DHS standard of 10 PM, and the facility had no television sets, dirty sheets, and meals consisting of one frankfurter and two 4-U.S.-fluid-ounce (120 mL) cups of juice. Steven Banks, as commissioner of the Department of Homeless Services, eliminated the "next step" program, converting it into a general population men's shelter with the maximum 200 beds.

The company rooms are used as dormitories, and the drill shed is filled with additional dormitories that are no longer in use after the 200-bed limitation was imposed (at one point it had 550 beds in active use). Memorial Hall is used as the mess, and is the only part of the building with central air conditioning. The offices, in one of the company rooms and in the base of the south tower, have window-mounted air conditioners. The north side of the drill hall contains the lavatories and laundry room, but the drill hall is mostly walled off (the walls are about four feet high) and accessible only to staff, as are all floors above the first.

On November 29, 2017, security staff and residents were caught on camera punching and kicking shelter resident Alexander Singh.

On October 25, 2021, The City published an interview with Wayne Batchelor, who chose to become street homeless after being forced back into Pamoja House while the pandemic continues.

== Architecture ==
The 13th Regiment Armory consists of an administration building as well as an attached barrel-vaulted drill shed to its east. The lot measures 200 feet (61 m) on Marcus Garvey Boulevard and 480 feet (150 m) along Putnam and Jefferson Avenues. According to Harper's Weekly, the building was designed to recall thirteenth century feudal France. Upon the 13th, 14th, and 23rd Regiment Armories' completions in the mid-1890s, the New-York Tribune stated that "these three armories are the product of a lavish expenditure ... for the support and encouragement of the militia that has perhaps never been excelled."

=== Exterior ===
The armory consists of an Administration Building 200 feet (61 m) wide by 180 feet (55 m) deep. To the east is a drill hall measuring 300 by 200 feet (91 by 61 m).

The main facade of the administration building is located along Marcus Garvey Boulevard to the west. This facade contains a large round-arched, stone-faced stone sally port, 28 feet (8.5 m) in diameter. There are two turreted towers flanking the arch, each with a diameter of 28 feet. The round towers are 200 feet (61 m) tall. The south tower has an observatory, while the north tower has an additional, smaller turret, rising another 28 feet, to serve as an outlook. A terrace measuring 16 by 45 feet (4.9 by 13.7 m) in area is located directly above the sally port.

=== Interior ===
The building contains a basement and four stories, counting a mezzanine. The basement included rifle galleries, firing rooms, squad drill rooms, large lavatories, and an engine room that provided heat and power to the entire armory. In the 1894 Harper's article, it was indicated that a swimming pool and bowling alleys were expected to be installed, but not at public expense. It includes company rooms 22 by 50 feet (6.7 by 15.2 m) feet with 14-foot-high (4.3 m) ceilings, six on each side, containing captains' and sergeants' rooms, private stairs to locker rooms in the mezzanine. Officers' rooms are on the second floor, described as "large and excellent." There were also council and Veteran Association rooms, 44 by 50 feet (13 by 15 m), and a gymnasium 50 by 80 feet (15 by 24 m) feet, also on the second floor. The third floor contained a mess-hall, kitchen, and lecture-room. A 1892 Harper's article described the premises as "one grand lyceum".

The drill hall contains galleries with built-in seats on the north, south, and west sides. The roof is supported by 200-foot arch iron trusses with a skylight in the center. The drill hall could be used for sports such as baseball and track and field, as well as for gymnastics and calisthenics.

== See also ==
- List of armories and arsenals in New York City and surrounding counties
