= Lincoln Club =

- U.S. National Register of Historic Places
- New York State Register of Historic Places
- New York City Landmark
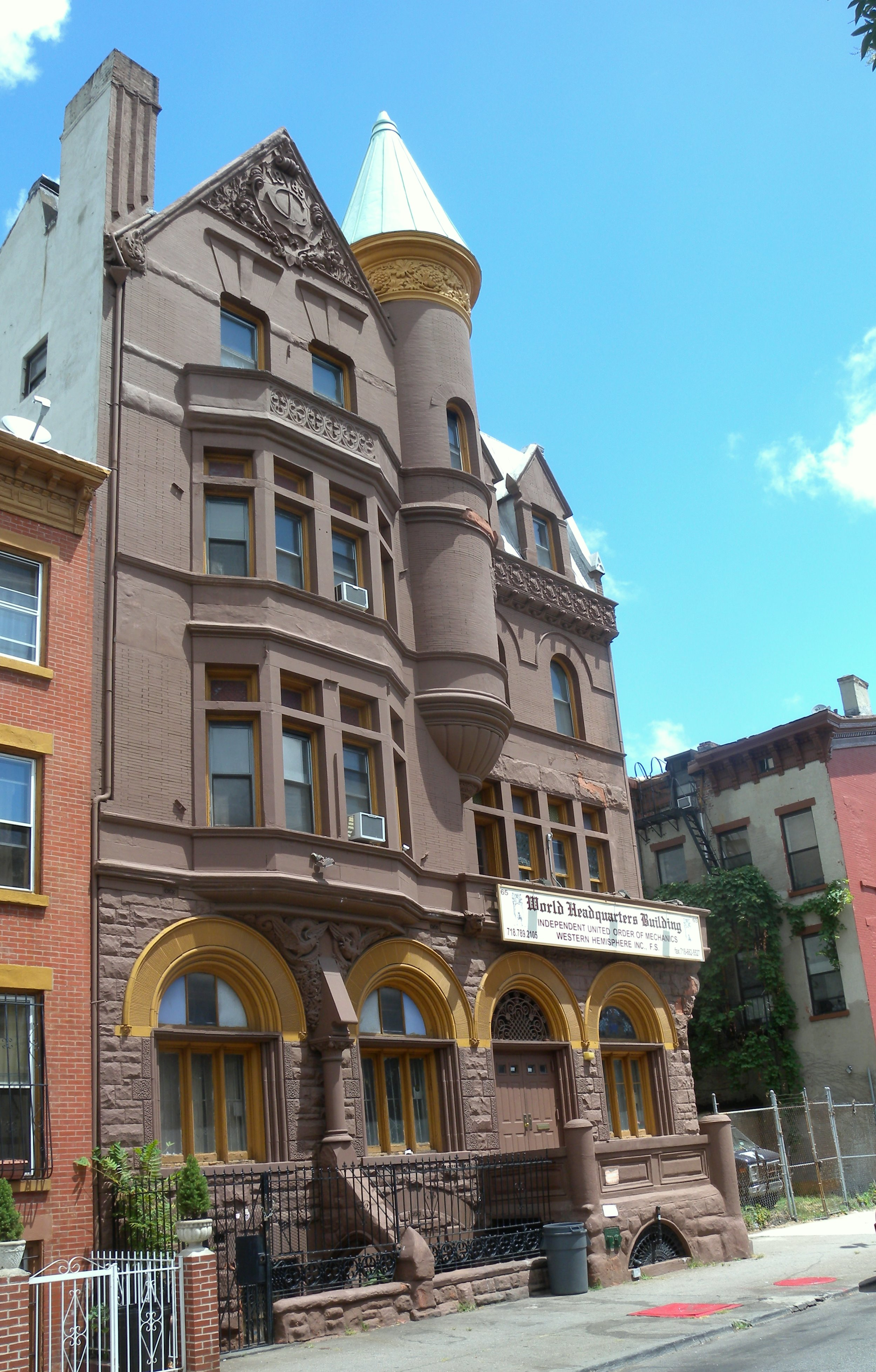

- Location within New York City Location within New York Location within the United States
- Location: 65 Putnam Ave., New York, New York
- Coordinates: 40°40′59″N 73°57′35″W
- Area: less than one acre
- Built: 1886
- Architect: Rudolph L. Daus
- Architectural style: Queen Anne
- NRHP reference No.: 83001693
- NYSRHP No.: 04701.001617
- NYCL No.: 2015

Significant dates
- Added to NRHP: January 27, 1983
- Designated NYSRHP: December 16, 1982
- Designated NYCL: May 12, 1981

Lincoln Club, also known as Mechanics Temple, Independent Order of Mechanics of the Western Hemisphere, is a historic clubhouse in Clinton Hill, Brooklyn, New York, New York. It was built between 1886 and 1889 and is a 4 1/2-story Queen Anne style masonry building. It is built of Roman brick and rock-faced Lake Superior brownstone with smooth brownstone bands and terra cotta ornament. It has a sunken basement and the front facade features four distinctive arches on the first floor and a 2-story oriel window.

It was listed on the National Register of Historic Places in 1983.

== See also ==
- List of New York City Designated Landmarks in Brooklyn
- National Register of Historic Places listings in Kings County, New York
