= 1970–1979 VMI Keydets basketball =

The VMI Keydets basketball teams represented the Virginia Military Institute in Lexington, Virginia. The program began in 1908, and played their games out of Cormack Field House, nicknamed “The Pit”. The Keydets were members of the Southern Conference. Their primary rival is The Citadel.

== 1969–70 ==
1969–70 VMI Keydets men's basketball
- Conference: Southern Conference
- Record: 6–19 (3–10 SoCon)
- Head coach: Mike Schuler
- Home arena: Cormack Field House

1969–70 Southern Conference men's basketball standings
	Conf.				Overall
Team	W		L	PCT	W		L	PCT
No. 15 Davidson †	10	–	0	1.000	22	–	5	.815
East Carolina	9	–	2	.818	16	–	10	.615
George Washington	6	–	4	.600	12	–	15	.444
Furman	5	–	6	.455	13	–	13	.500
William & Mary	5	–	7	.417	11	–	16	.407
The Citadel	4	–	8	.333	8	–	16	.333
Richmond	4	–	9	.308	9	–	18	.333
VMI	3	–	10	.231	6	–	19	.240
† Tournament winner As of April 30, 1970; Rankings from AP Poll

Date time, TV	Opponent	Result	Record	Site city, state
December 1* no, no	Atlantic Christian	W 82–76	1–0	Cormack Field House; Lexington, VA
December 3* no, no	at Navy	L 66–71	1–1	Halsey Field House; Annapolis, MD
December 6 no, no	at George Washington	L 78–80	1–2 (0–1)	Washington, D.C.
December 10* no, no	at Virginia	L 44–65	1–3	University Hall; Charlottesville, VA
December 18* no, no	vs. William & Mary; Big 5 Tournament	L 64–75	1–4	Holland Hall Gymnasium; Hampton, VA
December 20* no, no	vs. Richmond; Big 5 Tournament	L 61–69	1–5	Holland Hall Gymnasium; Hampton, VA
December 29* no, no	vs. Stetson; Gold Coast Classic	L 61–62	1–6	West Palm Beach, FL
December 30* no, no	vs. Florida Southern	W 66–60	2–6	West Palm Beach, FL
January 5* no, no	at Old Dominion	L 72–94	2–7	ODU Fieldhouse; Norfolk, VA
January 8 no, no	at Davidson	L 52–95	2–8 (0–2)	Johnston Gym; Davidson, NC
January 10 no, no	at East Carolina	L 66–108	2–9 (0–3)	Minges Coliseum; Greenville, NC
January 13 no, no	Richmond	W 71–70	3–9 (1–3)	Cormack Field House; Lexington, VA
January 17 no, no	at The Citadel	L 70–84	3–10 (1–4)	McAlister Field House; Charleston, SC
January 21* no, no	Roanoke	L 79–90	3–11	Cormack Field House; Lexington, VA
January 24* no, no	Wofford	W 78–64	4–11	Cormack Field House; Lexington, VA
January 29* no, no	Old Dominion	L 55–90	4–12	Cormack Field House; Lexington, VA
January 31 no, no	East Carolina	L 49–63	4–13 (1–5)	Cormack Field House; Lexington, VA
February 2 no, no	George Washington	L 79–107	4–14 (1–6)	Cormack Field House; Lexington, VA
February 5 no, no	Furman	W 67–66	5–14 (2–6)	Cormack Field House; Lexington, VA
February 10 no, no	William & Mary	W 74–68	6–14 (3–6)	Cormack Field House; Lexington, VA
February 14 no, no	at William & Mary	L 58–77	6–15 (3–7)	Blow Gymnasium; Williamsburg, VA
February 17 no, no	The Citadel	L 61–68	6–16 (3–8)	Cormack Field House; Lexington, VA
February 19 no, no	at Richmond	L 54–78	6–17 (3–9)	Richmond Arena; Richmond, VA
February 21 no, no	at Furman	L 52–53	6–18 (3–10)	Greenville Memorial Auditorium; Greenville, SC
1970 Southern Conference men's basketball tournament
February 26 no, no	vs. Davidson	L 46–72	6–19	Charlotte Coliseum; Charlotte, NC
*Non-conference game. (#) Tournament seedings in parentheses. All times are in Eastern Time.

== 1970–71 ==
1970–71 VMI Keydets men's basketball
- Conference: Southern Conference
- Record: 1–25 (1–11 SoCon)
- Head coach: Mike Schuler
- Home arena: Cormack Field House

1970–71 Southern Conference men's basketball standings
	Conf.				Overall
Team	W		L	PCT	W		L	PCT
Davidson	9	–	1	.900	15	–	11	.577
William & Mary	7	–	3	.700	11	–	16	.407
East Carolina	7	–	4	.636	13	–	12	.520
The Citadel	6	–	5	.545	13	–	12	.520
Furman †	5	–	5	.500	15	–	12	.556
Richmond	3	–	9	.250	7	–	21	.250
VMI	1	–	11	.083	1	–	25	.038
† Southern Conference Tournament winner Rankings from AP Poll

Date time, TV	Opponent	Result	Record	Site city, state
December 1* no, no	vs. Virginia; Big 5 Tournament	L 52–81	0–1	Holland Hall Gymnasium; Hampton, VA
December 3* no, no	vs. Richmond; Big 5 Tournament	L 57–75	0–2	Holland Hall Gymnasium; Hampton, VA
December 5* no, no	at Army	L 47–82	0–3	Gillis Field House; West Point, NY
December 7* no, no	Old Dominion	L 85–94	0–4	Cormack Field House; Lexington, VA
December 19 no, no	at William & Mary	L 49–75	0–5 (0–1)	Blow Gymnasium; Williamsburg, VA
December 23* no, no	at Toledo	L 46–79	0–6	Toledo Field House; Toledo, OH
January 2 no, no	at Furman	L 68–93	0–7 (0–2)	Greenville Memorial Auditorium; Greenville, SC
January 4* no, no	at South Alabama; Senior Bowl Tournament	L 67–80	0–8	Jag Gym; Mobile, AL
January 6* no, no	vs. Trinity (CT); Senior Bowl Tournament	L 70–95	0–9	Jag Gym; Mobile, AL
January 9 no, no	East Carolina	L 63–71	0–10 (0–3)	Cormack Field House; Lexington, VA
January 12* no, no	Gardner–Webb	L 72–95	0–11	Cormack Field House; Lexington, VA
January 16 no, no	The Citadel	L 64–66 ^{OT}	0–12 (0–4)	Cormack Field House; Lexington, VA
January 20* no, no	Roanoke	L 73–96	0–13	Cormack Field House; Lexington, VA
January 23* no, no	at Old Dominion	L 56–95	0–14	ODU Fieldhouse; Norfolk, VA
January 25* no, no	Eastern Illinois	L 45–59	0–15	Cormack Field House; Lexington, VA
January 27* no, no	George Washington	L 67–78	0–16	Cormack Field House; Lexington, VA
January 30 no, no	at East Carolina	L 67–78	0–17 (0–5)	Minges Coliseum; Greenville, NC
February 2 no, no	Davidson	L 39–70	0–18 (0–6)	Cormack Field House; Lexington, VA
February 4 no, no	at The Citadel	L 65–91	0–19 (0–7)	McAlister Field House; Charleston, SC
February 8 no, no	Richmond	W 73–63	1–19 (1–7)	Cormack Field House; Lexington, VA
February 10* no, no	at Navy	L 47–65	1–20	Halsey Field House; Annapolis, MD
February 13 no, no	Furman	L 79–88	1–21 (1–8)	Cormack Field House; Lexington, VA
February 16 no, no	William & Mary	L 69–85	1–22 (1–9)	Cormack Field House; Lexington, VA
February 20 no, no	at Richmond	L 77–93	1–23 (1–10)	Richmond Arena; Richmond, VA
February 24 no, no	at Davidson	L 64–109	1–24 (1–11)	Johnston Gym; Davidson, NC
1971 Southern Conference men's basketball tournament
March 4 no, no	vs. William & Mary	L 65–69	1–25	Charlotte Coliseum; Charlotte, NC
*Non-conference game. (#) Tournament seedings in parentheses. All times are in Eastern Time.

== 1971–72 ==
1971–72 VMI Keydets men's basketball
- Conference: Southern Conference
- Record: 6–19 (2–10 SoCon)
- Head coach: Mike Schuler
- Home arena: Cormack Field House

1971–72 Southern Conference men's basketball standings
	Conf.				Overall
Team	W		L	PCT	W		L	PCT
Davidson	8	–	2	.800	19	–	9	.679
Furman	8	–	3	.727	17	–	11	.607
William & Mary	6	–	4	.600	10	–	17	.370
East Carolina †	7	–	5	.583	14	–	15	.483
The Citadel	5	–	6	.455	12	–	13	.480
Richmond	3	–	9	.250	6	–	19	.240
VMI	2	–	10	.167	6	–	19	.240
† Southern Conference Tournament winner Rankings from AP Poll

Date time, TV	Opponent	Result	Record	Site city, state
December 1* no, no	West Virginia Wesleyan	W 95–78	1–0	Cormack Field House; Lexington, VA
December 4* no, no	Atlantic Christian	L 101–105 ^{OT}	1–1	Cormack Field House; Lexington, VA
December 11 no, no	at Richmond	L 61–73	1–2 (0–1)	Richmond Coliseum; Richmond, VA
December 20* no, no	vs. Virginia; Big 5 Tournament	L 51–93	1–3	Roanoke Civic Center; Roanoke, VA
December 21* no, no	vs. Virginia Tech; Big 5 Tournament	W 57–56	2–3	Roanoke Civic Center; Roanoke, VA
January 3* no, no	at Roanoke	L 69–96	2–4	Roanoke, VA
January 5* no, no	at Eastern Illinois	L 71–111	2–5	Lantz Arena; Charleston, IL
January 8 no, no	at East Carolina	L 57–62	2–6 (0–2)	Minges Coliseum; Greenville, SC
January 10* no, no	Old Dominion	L 82–96	2–7	Cormack Field House; Lexington, VA
January 12* no, no	Wofford	W 80–63	3–7	Cormack Field House; Lexington, VA
January 15 no, no	The Citadel	L 62–68 ^{OT}	3–8 (0–3)	Cormack Field House; Lexington, VA
January 18 no, no	Davidson	L 57–73	3–9 (0–4)	Cormack Field House; Lexington, VA
January 20* no, no	at George Washington	L 66–104	3–10	Washington, D.C.
January 22 no, no	Furman	L 62–97	3–11 (0–5)	Cormack Field House; Lexington, VA
January 25 no, no	at William & Mary	L 59–76	3–12 (0–6)	William & Mary Hall; Williamsburg, VA
January 29 no, no	East Carolina	L 56–66	3–13 (0–7)	Cormack Field House; Lexington, VA
February 1* no, no	at Ohio	L 60–98	3–14	Convocation Center; Athens, OH
February 3 no, no	at Davidson	L 61–84	3–15 (0–8)	Johnston Gym; Davidson, NC
February 7* no, no	Roanoke	L 66–87	3–16	Cormack Field House; Lexington, VA
February 12 no, no	at Furman	L 66–104	3–17 (0–9)	Greenville Memorial Auditorium; Greenville, SC
February 14 no, no	at The Citadel	L 60–87	3–18 (0–10)	McAlister Field House; Charleston, SC
February 16* no, no	West Virginia Tech	W 68–59	4–18	Cormack Field House; Lexington, VA
February 22 no, no	William & Mary	W 37–35 ^{OT}	5–18 (1–10)	Cormack Field House; Lexington, VA
February 24 no, no	Richmond	W 79–74 ^{2OT}	6–18 (2–10)	Cormack Field House; Lexington, VA
1972 Southern Conference men's basketball tournament
March 2 no, no	at Furman	L 80–126	6–19	Greenville Memorial Auditorium; Greenville, SC
*Non-conference game. (#) Tournament seedings in parentheses. All times are in Eastern Time.

== 1972–73 ==
1972–73 VMI Keydets men's basketball
- Conference: Southern Conference
- Record: 6–20 (3–9 SoCon)
- Head coach: Bill Blair
- Home arena: Cormack Field House

1972–73 Southern Conference men's basketball standings
	Conf.				Overall
Team	W		L	PCT	W		L	PCT
Davidson	9	–	1	.900	18	–	9	.667
Furman †	11	–	2	.846	20	–	9	.690
East Carolina	7	–	7	.500	13	–	13	.500
The Citadel	6	–	7	.462	11	–	15	.423
William & Mary	5	–	6	.455	10	–	17	.370
Richmond	5	–	9	.357	8	–	16	.333
Appalachian State	3	–	8	.273	6	–	20	.231
VMI	3	–	9	.250	6	–	20	.231
† Southern Conference Tournament winner Rankings from AP Poll

Date time, TV	Opponent	Result	Record	Site city, state
December 2* no, no	Hampden–Sydney	W 95–81	1–0	Cormack Field House; Lexington, VA
December 4* no, no	George Washington	L 73–85	1–1	Cormack Field House; Lexington, VA
December 6* no, no	at Virginia	L 67–85	1–2	University Hall; Charlottesville, VA
December 9 no, no	Richmond	W 71–60	2–2 (1–0)	Cormack Field House; Lexington, VA
December 18* no, no	at Texas A&M–Corpus Christi	L 50–57	2–3	American Bank Center; Corpus Christi, TX
December 20* no, no	at Rice	L 56–72	2–4	Rice Gymnasium; Houston, TX
December 22* no, no	at New Mexico State; New Mexico State Invitational	L 57–86	2–5	Pan American Center; Las Cruces, NM
December 23* no, no	vs. Xavier; New Mexico State Invitational	W 60–59	3–5	Pan American Center; Las Cruces, NM
January 3* no, no	at Wake Forest	L 57–71	3–6	Reynolds Gymnasium; Winston-Salem, NC
January 6 no, no	at East Carolina	L 63–81	3–7 (1–1)	Minges Coliseum; Greenville, NC
January 10* no, no	Roanoke	L 55–56	3–8	Cormack Field House; Lexington, VA
January 13 no, no	Appalachian State	W 82–68	4–8 (2–1)	Cormack Field House; Lexington, VA
January 18 no, no	Furman	L 49–86	4–9 (2–2)	Cormack Field House; Lexington, VA
January 20* no, no	West Virginia Tech	W 87–60	5–9	Cormack Field House; Lexington, VA
January 27 no, no	East Carolina	L 45–71	5–10 (2–3)	Cormack Field House; Lexington, VA
January 29 no, no	The Citadel	L 67–69	5–11 (2–4)	Cormack Field House; Lexington, VA
January 31 no, no	at William & Mary	L 59–77	5–12 (2–5)	William & Mary Hall; Williamsburg, VA
February 3* no, no	at Roanoke	L 58–66	5–13	Roanoke, VA
February 6 no, no	Davidson	L 88–105	5–14 (2–6)	Cormack Field House; Lexington, VA
February 10 no, no	at Furman	L 60–94	5–15 (2–7)	Greenville Memorial Auditorium; Greenville, SC
February 12 no, no	at The Citadel	L 62–75	5–16 (2–8)	McAlister Field House; Charleston, SC
February 15* no, no	Morris Harvey	L 60–65	5–17	Cormack Field House; Lexington, VA
February 17* no, no	at Old Dominion	L 56–72	5–18	ODU Fieldhouse; Norfolk, VA
February 20 no, no	William & Mary	W 66–64	6–18 (3–8)	Cormack Field House; Lexington, VA
February 22 no, no	at Richmond	L 84–113	6–19 (3–9)	Robins Center; Richmond, VA
1973 Southern Conference men's basketball tournament
March 1 no, no	vs. Davidson	L 77–88	6–20	Richmond Coliseum; Richmond, VA
*Non-conference game. (#) Tournament seedings in parentheses. All times are in Eastern Time.

Note: The February 15 game against Morris Harvey College was forfeited by VMI due to the use of an ineligible player.

== 1973–74 ==
1973–74 VMI Keydets men's basketball
- Conference: Southern Conference
- Record: 6–18 (3–9 SoCon)
- Head coach: Bill Blair
- Home arena: Cormack Field House

1973–74 Southern Conference men's basketball standings
	Conf.				Overall
Team	W		L	PCT	W		L	PCT
Furman †	11	–	1	.917	22	–	9	.710
Richmond	10	–	4	.714	16	–	12	.571
Davidson	7	–	3	.700	18	–	9	.667
East Carolina	8	–	6	.571	13	–	12	.520
William & Mary	5	–	6	.455	9	–	18	.333
The Citadel	4	–	9	.308	10	–	14	.417
VMI	3	–	9	.250	6	–	18	.250
Appalachian State	1	–	11	.083	5	–	20	.200
† Southern Conference Tournament winner Rankings from AP Poll

Date time, TV	Opponent	Result	Record	Site city, state
December 1* no, no	at Virginia Tech	L 51–62	0–1	VPI Coliseum; Blacksburg, VA
December 3* no, no	Hampden–Sydney	W 89–54	1–1	Cormack Field House; Lexington, VA
December 5* no, no	West Virginia Tech	L 48–49	1–2	Cormack Field House; Lexington, VA
December 8 no, no	at Appalachian State	W 74–65	2–2 (1–0)	Varsity Gymnasium; Boone, NC
December 12* no, no	James Madison	W 58–54	3–2	Cormack Field House; Lexington, VA
December 15* no, no	Towson	L 65–66	3–3	Cormack Field House; Lexington, VA
December 28* no, no	at Arkansas; Razorback Classic	L 86–96	3–4	Barton Coliseum; Little Rock, AR
December 29* no, no	vs. Connecticut; Razorback Classic	L 78–80	3–5	Barton Coliseum; Little Rock, AR
January 5 no, no	at Davidson	L 62–76	3–6 (1–1)	Johnston Gym; Davidson, NC
January 10* no, no	Salem	W 85–82	4–6	Cormack Field House; Lexington, VA
January 12 no, no	East Carolina	L 58–59	4–7 (1–2)	Cormack Field House; Lexington, VA
January 14 no, no	The Citadel	W 70–63	5–7 (2–2)	Cormack Field House; Lexington, VA
January 19* no, no	Loyola (MD)	L 69–71	5–8	Cormack Field House; Lexington, VA
January 22 no, no	at William & Mary	L 68–85	5–9 (2–3)	William & Mary Hall; Williamsburg, VA
January 26 no, no	at East Carolina	L 55–57	5–10 (2–4)	Minges Coliseum; Greenville, NC
January 29 no, no	Richmond	L 65–81	5–11 (2–5)	Cormack Field House; Lexington, VA
February 2* no, no	at Dayton	L 60–76	5–12	University of Dayton Arena; Dayton, OH
February 6 no, no	William & Mary	L 65–67	5–13 (2–6)	Cormack Field House; Lexington, VA
February 9 no, no	at Richmond	L 78–84	5–14 (2–7)	Robins Center; Richmond, VA
February 13 no, no	Appalachian State	W 62–59	6–14 (3–7)	Cormack Field House; Lexington, VA
February 16 no, no	at Furman	L 66–80	6–15 (3–8)	Greenville Memorial Auditorium; Greenville, SC
February 18 no, no	at The Citadel	L 47–65	6–16 (3–9)	McAlister Field House; Charleston, SC
February 21* no, no	Shepherd	L 76–85	6–17	Cormack Field House; Lexington, VA
1974 Southern Conference men's basketball tournament
February 27 no, no	at Richmond	L 59–69	6–18	Richmond Coliseum; Richmond, VA
*Non-conference game. (#) Tournament seedings in parentheses. All times are in Eastern Time.

== 1974–75 ==
1974–75 VMI Keydets men's basketball
- Conference: Southern Conference
- Record: 13–13 (6–6 SoCon)
- Head coach: Bill Blair
- Home arena: Cormack Field House

1974–75 Southern Conference men's basketball standings
	Conf.				Overall
Team	W		L	PCT	W		L	PCT
Furman†	12	–	0	1.000	22	–	7	.759
East Carolina	11	–	3	.786	19	–	9	.679
William & Mary	6	–	5	.545	16	–	12	.571
Richmond	7	–	7	.500	10	–	16	.385
VMI	6	–	6	.500	13	–	13	.500
Davidson	4	–	6	.400	7	–	19	.269
The Citadel	2	–	11	.154	5	–	15	.250
Appalachian State	1	–	11	.083	3	–	23	.115
† Southern Conference Tournament winner Rankings from AP Poll

Date time, TV	Opponent	Result	Record	Site city, state
November 30* no, no	Virginia Tech	L 64–96	0–1	Cormack Field House; Lexington, VA
December 5 no, no	at Appalachian State	W 98–81	1–1 (1–0)	Varsity Gymnasium; Boone, NC
December 10 no, no	at East Carolina	L 68–73	1–2 (1–1)	Minges Coliseum; Greenville, NC
December 14 no, no	Richmond	L 90–95	1–3 (1–2)	Cormack Field House; Lexington, VA
January 4* no, no	at Middle Tennessee	L 89–93	1–4	Murphy Center; Murfreesboro, TN
January 6* no, no	at South Alabama; Senior Bowl Tournament	L 96–116	1–5	Jag Gym; Mobile, AL
January 7* no, no	vs. Louisiana Tech; Senior Bowl Tournament	L 73–85	1–6	Jag Gym; Mobile, AL
January 11 no, no	at Richmond	W 98–95	2–6 (2–2)	Robins Center; Richmond, VA
January 13 no, no	The Citadel	W 108–101	3–6 (3–2)	Cormack Field House; Lexington, VA
January 15* no, no	Christopher Newport	W 86–66	4–6	Cormack Field House; Lexington, VA
January 18* no, no	Towson	W 67–65	5–6	Cormack Field House; Lexington, VA
January 20* no, no	Bethany	W 72–43	6–6	Cormack Field House; Lexington, VA
January 22 no, no	William & Mary	W 71–69	7–6 (4–2)	Cormack Field House; Lexington, VA
January 25 no, no	East Carolina	L 80–82	7–7 (4–3)	Cormack Field House; Lexington, VA
January 27 no, no	Appalachian State	W 73–55	8–7 (5–3)	Cormack Field House; Lexington, VA
January 30* no, no	Shepherd	W 96–83	9–7	Cormack Field House; Lexington, VA
February 3* no, no	George Washington	L 79–90	9–8	Washington, D.C.
February 5* no, no	Bridgewater	W 51–37	10–8	Cormack Field House; Lexington, VA
February 8 no, no	at The Citadel	W 82–68	11–8 (6–3)	McAlister Field House; Charleston, SC
February 11 no, no	Davidson	L 93–94 ^{2OT}	11–9 (6–4)	Cormack Field House; Lexington, VA
February 15* no, no	Old Dominion	L 69–84	11–10	Cormack Field House; Lexington, VA
February 19 no, no	at William & Mary	L 66–67 ^{OT}	11–11 (6–5)	William & Mary Hall; Williamsburg, VA
February 22 no, no	Furman	L 68–80	11–12 (6–6)	Cormack Field House; Lexington, VA
February 26* no, no	Virginia Wesleyan	W 99–68	12–12	Cormack Field House; Lexington, VA
1975 Southern Conference men's basketball tournament
March 1 no, no	at Richmond	W 85–81	13–12	Robins Center; Richmond, VA
March 5 no, no	at Furman	L 81–94	13–13	Greenville Memorial Auditorium; Greenville, SC
*Non-conference game. (#) Tournament seedings in parentheses. All times are in Eastern Time.

== 1975–76 ==
1975–76 VMI Keydets men's basketball

Southern Conference regular season champions Southern Conference tournament champions

NCAA tournament, Elite Eight
- Conference: Southern Conference
- Record: 22–10 (9–3 SoCon)
- Head coach: Bill Blair
- Home arena: Cormack Field House

1975–76 Southern Conference men's basketball standings
	Conf.				Overall
Team	W		L	PCT	W		L	PCT
VMI†	9	–	3	.750	22	–	10	.688
William & Mary	8	–	3	.727	15	–	13	.536
Richmond	7	–	7	.500	14	–	14	.500
East Carolina	7	–	7	.500	11	–	15	.423
Appalachian State	6	–	6	.500	13	–	14	.481
The Citadel	6	–	7	.462	10	–	17	.370
Furman	5	–	7	.417	9	–	18	.333
Davidson	1	–	9	.100	5	–	21	.192
† Southern Conference Tournament winner Rankings from AP Poll

Date time, TV	Opponent	Result	Record	Site city, state
November 29* no, no	Lebanon Valley	W 92–70	1–0	Cormack Field House; Lexington, VA
December 1* no, no	Liberty	W 106–58	2–0	Cormack Field House; Lexington, VA
December 3* no, no	at James Madison	L 76–82	2–1	Harrisonburg, VA
December 6 no, no	East Carolina	W 73–56	3–1 (1–0)	Cormack Field House; Lexington, VA
December 8* no, no	Georgia Tech	W 68–53	4–1	Cormack Field House; Lexington, VA
December 11* no, no	Radford	W 112–65	5–1	Cormack Field House; Lexington, VA
December 13 no, no	Richmond	W 65–60	6–1 (2–0)	Cormack Field House; Lexington, VA
December 29* no, no	at Indiana State; Indiana Hall of Fame Classic	L 60–88	6–2	Hulman Center; Terre Haute, IN
December 30* no, no	vs. Pacific; Indiana Hall of Fame Classic	W 72–59	7–2	Hulman Center; Terre Haute, IN
January 3* no, no	vs. Virginia	L 63–74	7–3	Roanoke Civic Center; Roanoke, VA
January 7 no, no	at Furman	W 82–67	8–3 (3–0)	Greenville Memorial Auditorium; Greenville, SC
January 10* no, no	Salem	W 108–84	9–3	Cormack Field House; Lexington, VA
January 12 no, no	at The Citadel	L 74–78	9–4 (3–1)	McAlister Field House; Charleston, SC
January 15* no, no	at Old Dominion	L 70–72	9–5	ODU Fieldhouse; Norfolk, VA
January 17 no, no	at Appalachian State	L 67–71	9–6 (3–2)	Varsity Gymnasium; Boone, NC
January 21 no, no	William & Mary	W 84–78	10–6 (4–2)	Cormack Field House; Lexington, VA
January 24 no, no	at East Carolina	W 74–60	11–6 (5–2)	Minges Coliseum; Greenville, NC
January 29* no, no	Green Bay	L 74–76 ^{OT}	11–7	Cormack Field House; Lexington, VA
February 2* no, no	at Georgia Tech	L 56–66	11–8	Hank McCamish Pavilion; Atlanta, GA
February 5* no, no	Southeastern	W 97–57	12–8	Cormack Field House; Lexington, VA
February 7 no, no	at William & Mary	L 62–68	12–9 (5–3)	William & Mary Hall; Williamsburg, VA
February 11 no, no	at Davidson	W 92–76	13–9 (6–3)	Johnston Gym; Davidson, NC
February 14 no, no	The Citadel	W 76–59	14–9 (7–3)	Cormack Field House; Lexington, VA
February 18 no, no	at Richmond	W 74–67	15–9 (8–3)	Robins Center; Richmond, VA
February 21 no, no	Appalachian State	W 78–74	16–9 (9–3)	Cormack Field House; Lexington, VA
February 24* no, no	Southern Wesleyan	W 85–48	17–9	Cormack Field House; Lexington, VA
1976 Southern Conference men's basketball tournament
February 28 no, no	Davidson	W 71–69	18–9	Cormack Field House; Lexington, VA
March 2 no, no	vs. Appalachian State	W 71–64	19–9	Greenville Memorial Auditorium; Greenville, SC
March 3 no, no	vs. Richmond	W 41–33	20–9	Greenville Memorial Auditorium; Greenville, SC
NCAA tournament
March 13* no, no	vs. Tennessee; First Round	W 81–75	21–9	Charlotte Coliseum; Charlotte, NC
March 18* no, no	vs. DePaul; Sweet Sixteen	W 71–66 ^{OT}	22–9	Greensboro Coliseum; Greensboro, NC
March 20* no, no	vs. Rutgers; Elite Eight	L 75–91	22–10	Greensboro Coliseum; Greensboro, NC
*Non-conference game. (#) Tournament seedings in parentheses. All times are in Eastern Time.

== 1976–77 ==
1976–77 VMI Keydets men's basketball

Southern Conference regular season co-champions Southern Conference tournament champions

NCAA tournament, Sweet Sixteen
- Conference: Southern Conference

Ranking
- AP: No. 20
- Record: 26–4 (8–2 SoCon)
- Head coach: Charlie Schmaus
- Home arena: Cormack Field House

1976–77 Southern Conference men's basketball standings
	Conf.				Overall
Team	W		L	PCT	W		L	PCT
No. 20 VMI †	8	–	2	.800	26	–	4	.867
Furman	8	–	2	.800	18	–	10	.643
Appalachian State	8	–	4	.667	17	–	12	.586
William & Mary	7	–	4	.636	16	–	14	.533
East Carolina	3	–	9	.250	10	–	18	.357
Davidson	2	–	8	.200	5	–	22	.185
The Citadel	2	–	9	.182	8	–	19	.296
† Southern Conference Tournament winner Rankings from AP Poll

Date time, TV	Opponent	Result	Record	Site city, state
November 26* no, no	vs. James Madison; UVA Tip-Off	W 85–77	1–0	University Hall; Charlottesville, VA
November 27* no, no	at Virginia; UVA Tip-Off	L 50–55	1–1	University Hall; Charlottesville, VA
December 4 no, no	at East Carolina	W 78–67	2–1 (1–0)	Minges Coliseum; Greenville, NC
December 8* no, no	Radford	W 74–52	3–1	Cormack Field House; Lexington, VA
December 11* no, no	Old Dominion	W 62–60	4–1	Cormack Field House; Lexington, VA
December 28* no, no	vs. Tulane; All-College tournament	W 75–66	5–1	Oklahoma City, OK
December 29* no, no	vs. California; All-College Tournament	W 73–71	6–1	Oklahoma City, OK
December 30* no, no	at Oklahoma City; All-College Tournament	W 69–58	7–1	Oklahoma City, OK
January 5* no, no	Roanoke	W 73–57	8–1	Cormack Field House; Lexington, VA
January 8* no, no	Emory and Henry	W 107–71	9–1	Cormack Field House; Lexington, VA
January 10 no, no	Appalachian State	W 74–54	10–1 (2–0)	Cormack Field House; Lexington, VA
January 12 no, no	William & Mary	W 92–79	11–1 (3–0)	Cormack Field House; Lexington, VA
January 17 no, no	at The Citadel	W 68–62	12–1 (4–0)	McAlister Field House; Charleston, SC
January 20* no, no	at Richmond	W 88–79	13–1	Robins Center; Richmond, VA
January 22 no, no	East Carolina	W 67–58	14–1 (5–0)	Cormack Field House; Lexington, VA
January 24* no, no	Southern Wesleyan	W 104–97	15–1	Cormack Field House; Lexington, VA
January 29 no, no	The Citadel	W 88–70	16–1 (6–0)	Cormack Field House; Lexington, VA
January 31 no, no	Furman	W 99–86	17–1 (7–0)	Cormack Field House; Lexington, VA
February 2* no, no	Hampden–Sydney	W 94–78	18–1	Cormack Field House; Lexington, VA
February 7 no, no	vs. Marshall	W 97–90	19–1	Roanoke Civic Center; Roanoke, VA
February 9* no, no	Morris Harvey	W 98–84	20–1	Cormack Field House; Lexington, VA
February 12* no, no	Richmond	W 92–87	21–1	Cormack Field House; Lexington, VA
February 14 no, no	Davidson	W 93–68	22–1 (8–0)	Cormack Field House; Lexington, VA
February 16 no, no	at William & Mary	L 84–86	22–2 (8–1)	William & Mary Hall; Williamsburg, VA
February 19 no, no	at Appalachian State	L 58–62	22–3 (8–2)	Varsity Gymnasium; Boone, NC
February 22* no, no	Randolph–Macon	W 81–75	23–3	Cormack Field House; Lexington, VA
1977 Southern Conference men's basketball tournament
February 26 no, no	vs. East Carolina	W 88–77	24–3	Roanoke Civic Center; Roanoke, VA
March 2 no, no	vs. Appalachian State	W 69–67 ^{OT}	25–3	Roanoke Civic Center; Roanoke, VA
1977 NCAA Men's Division I Basketball Tournament
March 12* no, no	vs. Duquesne; First Round	W 73–66	26–3	Reynolds Coliseum; Raleigh, NC
March 17* no, no	vs. Kentucky; Sweet Sixteen	L 78–93	26–4	Cole Field House; College Park, MD
*Non-conference game. (#) Tournament seedings in parentheses. All times are in Eastern Time.

== 1977–78 ==
1977–78 VMI Keydets men's basketball
- Conference: Southern Conference
- Record: 21–7 (7–3 SoCon)
- Head coach: Charlie Schmaus
- Home arena: Cormack Field House

1977–78 Southern Conference men's basketball standings
	Conf.				Overall
Team	W		L	PCT	W		L	PCT
Appalachian State	9	–	3	.750	15	–	13	.536
VMI	7	–	3	.700	21	–	7	.750
Marshall	8	–	5	.615	14	–	15	.483
Furman †	7	–	5	.583	19	–	11	.633
Chattanooga	7	–	5	.583	16	–	11	.593
Western Carolina	4	–	8	.333	7	–	19	.269
Davidson	3	–	7	.300	9	–	18	.333
The Citadel	2	–	11	.154	8	–	19	.296
† 1978 Southern Conference tournament winner Rankings from AP Poll

Date time, TV	Opponent	Result	Record	Site city, state
November 25* no, no	vs. Roanoke; UVA Tip-Off	W 64–50	1–0	University Hall; Charlottesville, VA
November 26* no, no	at Virginia; UVA Tip-Off	L 70–90	1–1	University Hall; Charlottesville, VA
November 28* no, no	Liberty	W 105–68	2–1	Cormack Field House; Lexington, VA
November 30* no, no	Alderson Broaddus	W 107–90	3–1	Cormack Field House; Lexington, VA
December 5 no, no	Chattanooga	W 81–72	4–1 (1–0)	Cormack Field House; Lexington, VA
December 7* no, no	James Madison	W 86–68	5–1	Cormack Field House; Lexington, VA
December 10 no, no	at Appalachian State	L 77–92	5–2 (1–1)	Varsity Gymnasium; Boone, NC
December 28* no, no	at Toledo; Blade Grass City Classic	L 68–91	5–3	Savage Arena; Toledo, OH
December 29* no, no	vs. Long Beach State; Blade Grass City Classic	L 97–106	5–4	Savage Arena; Toledo, OH
January 3* no, no	vs. Cleveland State; Siena College Tournament	W 71–66	6–4	Alumni Recreation Center; Loudonville, NY
January 4* no, no	at Siena; Siena College Tournament	W 72–61	7–4	Alumni Recreation Center; Loudonville, NY
January 9* no, no	Southern Wesleyan	W 98–79	8–4	Cormack Field House; Lexington, VA
January 12 no, no	at Furman	L 79–102	8–5 (1–2)	Greenville Memorial Auditorium; Greenville, SC
January 14 no, no	at Western Carolina	W 77–68	9–5 (2–2)	Cullowhee, NC
January 17 no, no	Marshall	W 79–71	10–5 (3–2)	Cormack Field House; Lexington, VA
January 21* no, no	Salem	W 84–70	11–5	Cormack Field House; Lexington, VA
January 23 no, no	at Davidson	W 89–69	12–5 (4–2)	Cormack Field House; Lexington, VA
January 25* no, no	at Old Dominion	W 69–60	13–5	ODU Fieldhouse; Norfolk, VA
January 28 no, no	at The Citadel	W 79–61	14–5 (5–2)	McAlister Field House; Charleston, SC
February 1* no, no	Richmond	W 110–90	15–5	Cormack Field House; Lexington, VA
February 4* no, no	at Roanoke	W 61–47	16–5	Roanoke, VA
February 8* no, no	at Richmond	W 66–51	17–5	Robins Center; Richmond, VA
February 11 no, no	The Citadel	W 84–72	18–5 (6–2)	Cormack Field House; Lexington, VA
February 13 no, no	at Marshall	L 71–88	18–6 (6–3)	Veterans Memorial Fieldhouse; Huntington, WV
February 15* no, no	vs. William & Mary	W 60–59	19–6	Holland Hall Gymnasium; Hampton, VA
February 18 no, no	Appalachian State	W 77–70	20–6 (7–3)	Cormack Field House; Lexington, VA
1978 Southern Conference men's basketball tournament
February 25 no, no	Davidson	W 95–80	21–6	Cormack Field House; Lexington, VA
March 3 no, no	vs. Marshall	L 71–76	21–7	Roanoke Civic Center; Roanoke, VA
*Non-conference game. (#) Tournament seedings in parentheses. All times are in Eastern Time.

== 1978–79 ==
1978–79 VMI Keydets men's basketball
- Conference: Southern Conference
- Record: 12–15 (2–8 SoCon)
- Head coach: Charlie Schmaus
- Home arena: Cormack Field House

1978–79 Southern Conference men's basketball standings
	Conf.				Overall
Team	W		L	PCT	W		L	PCT
Appalachian State †	11	–	3	.786	23	–	6	.793
Furman	9	–	3	.750	20	–	9	.690
The Citadel	10	–	4	.714	20	–	7	.741
Western Carolina	5	–	7	.417	14	–	14	.500
Marshall	5	–	8	.385	11	–	16	.407
Davidson	3	–	7	.300	8	–	19	.296
Chattanooga	3	–	8	.273	14	–	13	.519
VMI	2	–	8	.200	12	–	15	.444
† 1979 Southern Conference Tournament winner Rankings from AP poll

Date time, TV	Opponent	Result	Record	Site city, state
November 27* no, no	UNC Greensboro	W 114–91	1–0	Cormack Field House; Lexington, VA
November 29* no, no	Radford	W 90–88	2–0	Cormack Field House; Lexington, VA
November 30* no, no	West Liberty State	W 86–83	3–0	Cormack Field House; Lexington, VA
December 2* no, no	vs. Virginia Tech	L 66–79	3–1	Roanoke Civic Center; Roanoke, VA
December 6* no, no	at James Madison	L 71–93	3–2	Harrisonburg, VA
December 9* no, no	Bethany	W 90–73	4–2	Cormack Field House; Lexington, VA
December 13 no, no	at Appalachian State	L 82–103	4–3 (0–1)	Varsity Gymnasium; Boone, NC
December 16* no, no	Georgia State	W 75–72	5–3	Cormack Field House; Lexington, VA
December 28* no, no	vs. UCF; Tangerine Bowl Tournament	L 91–108	5–4	Winter Park, FL
December 29* no, no	vs. Stetson; Tangerine Bowl Tournament	L 89–98	5–5	Winter Park, FL
January 10 no, no	at The Citadel	L 83–91	5–6 (0–2)	McAlister Field House; Charleston, SC
January 17 no, no	Appalachian State	L 58–73	5–7 (0–3)	Cormack Field House; Lexington, VA
January 20 no, no	at Chattanooga	W 64–56	6–7 (1–3)	Maclellan Gymnasium; Chattanooga, TN
January 22* no, no	Cleveland State	W 75–72 ^{OT}	7–7	Cormack Field House; Lexington, VA
January 24* no, no	Richmond	L 78–90	7–8	Cormack Field House; Lexington, VA
January 27 no, no	Western Carolina	L 65–76	7–9 (1–4)	Cormack Field House; Lexington, VA
January 31* no, no	Christopher Newport	W 75–49	8–9	Cormack Field House; Lexington, VA
February 1* no, no	Campbell	W 78–74	9–9	Cormack Field House; Lexington, VA
February 3* no, no	Fairleigh Dickinson	W 79–77	10–9	Cormack Field House; Lexington, VA
February 5 no, no	at Marshall	W 63–58	11–9 (2–4)	Veterans Memorial Fieldhouse; Huntington, WV
February 8* no, no	at Georgia State	W 76–72	12–9	GSU Sports Arena; Atlanta, GA
February 10 no, no	Davidson	L 54–81	12–10 (2–5)	Cormack Field House; Lexington, VA
February 12 no, no	The Citadel	L 69–72	12–11 (2–6)	Cormack Field House; Lexington, VA
February 14 no, no	Marshall	L 66–88	12–12 (2–7)	Cormack Field House; Lexington, VA
February 19 no, no	Furman	L 65–80	12–13 (2–8)	Cormack Field House; Lexington, VA
February 21* no, no	at Richmond	L 76–79	12–14	Robins Center; Richmond, VA
1979 Southern Conference men's basketball tournament
February 24 no, no	at Appalachian State	L 63–73	12–15	Varsity Gymnasium; Boone, NC
*Non-conference game. (#) Tournament seedings in parentheses. All times are in Eastern Time.
