= List of The Citadel Bulldogs basketball seasons =

The following is a list of The Citadel basketball seasons. The Citadel, The Military College of South Carolina is a member of the Southern Conference of the NCAA Division I. The Citadel did not field a team from 1901–1912. The Citadel has won one conference championship, the 1927 Southern Intercollegiate Athletic Association Tournament, but has never participated in the NCAA tournament. The Bulldogs only appearance in a postseason tournament was during the 2008–09 season, when they participated in the 2009 CollegeInsider.com Postseason Tournament, falling in the first round to eventual champion Old Dominion.

Season	Head coach	Conference	Season results							Conference tournament result	Postseason result	Final AP Poll
Season	Head coach	Conference	Overall			Conference				Conference tournament result	Postseason result	Final AP Poll
Season	Head coach	Conference	Wins	Losses	%	Wins	Losses	%	Finish	Conference tournament result	Postseason result	Final AP Poll
1900–01	Not Available	Independent	0	1	.000	—	—	—	—	—	—	—
1912–13	J. G. Briggs	Independent	2	3	.400	—	—	—	—	—	—	—
1913–14	Darl Buse	Independent	6	1	.857	—	—	—	—	—	—	—
1914–15	Hans Kangeter	Independent	5	2	.714	—	—	—	—	—	—	—
1915–16	Hans Kangeter	Independent	4	2	.667	—	—	—	—	—	—	—
1916–17	Harvey O'Brien	Independent	6	1	.857	—	—	—	—	—	—	—
1917–18	Harvey O'Brien	Independent	0	1	.000	—	—	—	—	—	—	—
1918–19	C. F. Myers	Independent	9	0	1.000	—	—	—	—	—	—	—
1919–20	C. F. Myers	Independent	11	0	1.000	—	—	—	—	—	—	—
1920–21	C. F. Myers	Southern Intercollegiate	8	7	.533	1	3	.250	—	—	—	—
1921–22	C. F. Myers	Southern Intercollegiate	6	5	.545	2	1	.667	—	First Round	—	—
1922–23	C. F. Myers	Southern Intercollegiate	5	5	.500	0	2	.000	—	—	—	—
1923–24	C. F. Myers	Southern Intercollegiate	2	8	.200	0	2	.000	—	—	—	—
1924–25	C. F. Myers	Southern Intercollegiate	11	2	.846	4	1	.800	—	Second Round	—	—
1925–26	Locke Brown	Southern Intercollegiate	10	6	.625	4	1	.800	—	Third Round	—	—
1926–27	Benny Blatt	Southern Intercollegiate	17	2	.895	3	0	1.000	—	Champion	—	—
1927–28	Benny Blatt	Southern Intercollegiate	13	5	.722	1	1	.500	—	First Round	—	—
1928–29	Benny Blatt	Southern Intercollegiate	12	4	.750	3	1	.750	—	—	—	—
1929–30	Benny Blatt	Southern Intercollegiate	10	11	.476	1	2	.333	—	—	—	—
1930–31	Johnny Douglas	Southern Intercollegiate	6	9	.400	1	0	1.000	—	—	—	—
1931–32	Johnny Douglas	Southern Intercollegiate	8	11	.421	0	2	.000	—	—	—	—
1932–33	Johnny Douglas	Southern Intercollegiate	4	11	.267	0	1	.000	—	—	—	—
1933–34	Charlie Willard	Southern Intercollegiate	8	7	.533	—	—	—	—	—	—	—
1934–35	Charlie Willard	Southern Intercollegiate	5	9	.357	—	—	—	—	—	—	—
1935–36	Rock Norman	Southern Intercollegiate	7	5	.583	0	1	.000	—	—	—	—
1936–37	Rock Norman	Southern	7	12	.368	0	7	.000	—	First Round	—	—
1937–38	Rock Norman	Southern	13	5	.722	7	3	.700	3rd	First Round	—	—
1938–39	Rock Norman	Southern	13	5	.722	7	4	.636	—	First Round	—	—
1939–40	Rock Norman	Southern	5	5	.500	2	1	.667	—	—	—	—
1939–40	Ben Parker	Southern	3	4	.429	3	4	.429	—	First Round	—	—
1940–41	Ben Parker	Southern	3	12	.200	1	9	.100	—	—	—	—
1941–42	Ben Clemons	Southern	2	14	.125	2	7	.222	16th	—	—	—
1942–43	Bo Sherman	Southern	8	6	.571	5	3	.625	5th	Second Round	—	—
1943–44	Ben Clemons	Southern	2	3	.400	0	1	.000	11th	—	—	—
1944–45	Ernest Wehman	Southern	9	5	.643	8	4	.667	5th	First Round	—	—
1945–46	Eugene Clark	Southern	8	10	.444	2	6	.250	—	—	—	—
1946–47	Whitey Piro	Southern	4	11	.267	0	10	.000	—	—	—	—
1947–48	Bernard O'Neil	Southern	8	9	.471	4	8	.333	12th	—	—	—
1948–49	Bernard O'Neil	Southern	1	15	.063	0	11	.000	16th	—	—	—
1949–50	Bernard O'Neil	Southern	4	16	.200	2	10	.167	15th	—	—	—
1950–51	Bernard O'Neil	Southern	7	10	.412	2	7	.222	14th	—	—	—
1951–52	Bernard O'Neil	Southern	8	21	.276	1	11	.083	17th	—	—	—
1952–53	Leo Zack	Southern	4	14	.222	0	11	.000	17th	—	—	—
1953–54	Leo Zack	Southern	1	19	.050	1	7	.125	—	—	—	—
1954–55	Jim Browning	Southern	1	18	.053	0	10	.000	10th	—	—	—
1955–56	Hank Witt	Southern	2	19	.095	0	10	.000	10th	—	—	—
1956–57	Norm Sloan	Southern	11	14	.440	9	5	.643	7th	First Round	—	—
1957–58	Norm Sloan	Southern	16	11	.593	9	6	.600	4th	First Round	—	—
1958–59	Norm Sloan	Southern	15	5	.750	7	4	.636	3rd	Third Round (Finals)	—	—
1959–60	Norm Sloan	Southern	15	8	.652	8	4	.667	4th	First Round	—	—
1960–61	Mel Thompson	Southern	17	8	.680	10	4	.714	—	Second Round	—	—
1961–62	Mel Thompson	Southern	8	15	.348	4	8	.333	7th	First Round	—	—
1962–63	Mel Thompson	Southern	3	20	.130	2	10	.167	9th	First Round	—	—
1963–64	Mel Thompson	Southern	11	10	.524	4	8	.333	8th	First Round	—	—
1964–65	Mel Thompson	Southern	13	11	.542	8	7	.533	—	First Round	—	—
1965–66	Mel Thompson	Southern	7	16	.304	4	9	.308	8th	First Round	—	—
1966–67	Mel Thompson	Southern	8	17	.320	6	7	.462	5th	First Round	—	—
1967–68	Dick Campbell	Southern	11	14	.440	6	5	.545	3rd	First Round	—	—
1968–69	Dick Campbell	Southern	13	12	.520	5	8	.385	6th	First Round	—	—
1969–70	Dick Campbell	Southern	8	16	.333	4	9	.308	—	First Round	—	—
1970–71	Dick Campbell	Southern	13	12	.520	6	5	.545	4th	First Round	—	—
1971–72	George Hill	Southern	12	13	.480	5	6	.454	5th	First Round	—	—
1972–73	George Hill	Southern	11	15	.423	6	7	.462	5th	First Round	—	—
1973–74	George Hill	Southern	10	14	.417	4	9	.308	6th	First Round	—	—
1974–75	Les Robinson	Southern	5	15	.250	2	11	.154	7th	First Round	—	—
1975–76	Les Robinson	Southern	10	17	.370	6	8	.429	—	First Round	—	—
1976–77	Les Robinson	Southern	8	19	.296	0	10	.000	—	First Round	—	—
1977–78	Les Robinson	Southern	8	19	.296	2	11	.154	7th	First Round	—	—
1978–79	Les Robinson	Southern	20	7	.741	10	4	.714	3rd	First Round	—	—
1979–80	Les Robinson	Southern	14	13	.519	6	10	.375	7th	First Round	—	—
1980–81	Les Robinson	Southern	9	17	.346	2	14	.125	9th	—	—	—
1981–82	Les Robinson	Southern	14	14	.500	7	9	.438	6th	First Round	—	—
1982–83	Les Robinson	Southern	12	16	.429	7	9	.438	6th	First Round	—	—
1983–84	Les Robinson	Southern	14	14	.500	8	8	.500	5th	First Round	—	—
1984–85	Les Robinson	Southern	18	11	.621	11	5	.687	3rd	Second Round	—	—
1985–86	Randy Nesbit	Southern	10	18	.476	5	11	.313	7th	First Round	—	—
1986–87	Randy Nesbit	Southern	13	15	.464	6	10	.375	5th	First Round	—	—
1987–88	Randy Nesbit	Southern	8	20	.400	5	11	.313	9th	First Round	—	—
1988–89	Randy Nesbit	Southern	16	12	.571	7	7	.500	5th	First Round	—	—
1989–90	Randy Nesbit	Southern	13	16	.448	5	9	.357	6th	First Round	—	—
1990–91	Randy Nesbit	Southern	6	22	.214	1	13	.071	8th	First Round	—	—
1991–92	Randy Nesbit	Southern	10	18	.257	3	11	.214	8th	First Round	—	—
1992–93	Pat Dennis	Southern	10	17	.370	8	10	.444	6th	First Round	—	—
1993–94	Pat Dennis	Southern	11	16	.407	6	12	.333	8th	First Round	—	—
1994–95	Pat Dennis	Southern	11	16	.407	6	8	.429	3rd (South)	First Round	—	—
1995–96	Pat Dennis	Southern	10	16	.385	5	9	.357	4th (South)	First Round	—	—
1996–97	Pat Dennis	Southern	13	14	.481	6	8	.429	3rd (South)	First Round	—	—
1997–98	Pat Dennis	Southern	15	13	.536	6	8	.429	3rd (South)	Second Round	—	—
1998–99	Pat Dennis	Southern	9	18	.333	3	13	.188	6th (South)	First Round	—	—
1999–2000	Pat Dennis	Southern	10	20	.333	5	10	.333	5th (South)	First Round	—	—
2000–01	Pat Dennis	Southern	16	12	.571	9	7	.563	3rd (South)	First Round	—	—
2001–02	Pat Dennis	Southern	17	12	.586	8	8	.500	4th (South)	Second Round	—	—
2002–03	Pat Dennis	Southern	8	20	.286	3	13	.188	6th (South)	First Round	—	—
2003–04	Pat Dennis	Southern	6	22	.214	2	14	.125	6th (South)	First Round	—	—
2004–05	Pat Dennis	Southern	12	16	.429	4	12	.250	6th (South)	First Round	—	—
2005–06	Pat Dennis	Southern	10	21	.323	1	14	.067	6th (South)	Second Round	—	—
2006–07	Ed Conroy	Southern	7	23	.233	4	14	.222	6th (South)	First Round	—	—
2007–08	Ed Conroy	Southern	6	24	.200	1	19	.050	6th (South)	First Round	—	—
2008–09	Ed Conroy	Southern	20	13	.606	15	5	.750	T-2nd (South)	Quarterfinals	CollegeInsider.com Tournament First Round	—
2009–10	Ed Conroy	Southern	16	16	.500	9	9	.500	4th (South)	Quarterfinals	—	—
2010–11	Chuck Driesell	Southern	10	22	.313	6	12	.333	5th (South)	First Round	—	—
2011–12	Chuck Driesell	Southern	6	24	.200	3	15	.167	6th (South)	First Round	—	—
2012–13	Chuck Driesell	Southern	8	22	.267	5	13	.278	5th (South)	First Round	—	—
2013–14	Chuck Driesell	Southern	7	26	.212	2	14	.125	11th	Quarterfinals	—	—
2014–15	Chuck Driesell	Southern	11	19	.367	6	12	.333	T-7th	First Round	—	—
2015–16	Duggar Baucom	Southern	10	22	.313	3	15	.167	10th	First Round	—	—
2016–17	Duggar Baucom	Southern	12	21	.364	4	14	.222	T-8th	Quarterfinals	—	—
2017–18	Duggar Baucom	Southern	11	21	.344	5	13	.278	8th	Quarterfinals	—	—
2018–19	Duggar Baucom	Southern	12	18	.400	4	14	.222	T-8th	First Round	—	—
2019–20	Duggar Baucom	Southern	6	24	.200	0	18	.000	10th	First Round	—	—
2020–21	Duggar Baucom	Southern	13	12	.520	5	11	.313	8th	Quarterfinals	—	—
2021–22	Duggar Baucom	Southern	13	18	.419	6	12	.333	9th	Quarterfinals	—	—
2022–23	Ed Conroy	Southern	10	22	.313	5	13	.278	9th	First Round	—	—
2023–24	Ed Conroy	Southern	11	21	.344	3	15	.167	9th	First Round	—	—
2024–25	Ed Conroy	Southern	5	25	.167	0	18	.000	10th	First Round	—	—
2025–26	Ed Conroy	Southern	11	21	.344	7	11	.389	T-8th	Quarterfinals	—	—
