= Aron Stewart =

American basketball player (1950–2026)

Personal information
- Born: November 17, 1950 Jersey City, New Jersey, U.S.
- Died: February 20, 2026 (aged 75)
- Listed height: 6 ft 5 in (1.96 m)
- Listed weight: 205 lb (93 kg)

Career information
- High school: Lincoln (Jersey City, New Jersey)
- College: Essex CC (1969–1971); Richmond (1972–1974)
- NBA draft: 1973: 4th round, 65th overall pick
- Drafted by: Capital Bullets
- Positions: Small forward, shooting guard

Career highlights
- SoCon Player of the Year (1973); 2× First-team All-SoCon (1973, 1974); SoCon tournament MVP (1974); First-team NJCAA All-American (1971)
- Stats at Basketball Reference

Aron Stewart (November 17, 1950 – February 20, 2026) was an American college basketball player for the Richmond Spiders from 1972 to 1974. He played in 44 games for the Spiders, scoring 1,237 points and averaging a school-record 28.1 points per game for his career. Stewart was named the Southern Conference Player of the Year in 1973.

== Early life ==
Stewart was born in Jersey City, New Jersey, on November 17, 1950. He attended Lincoln High School in his home city between 1965–66 and 1968–69. At 6 ft 5 in (1.96 m), he played shooting guard and small forward. Stewart's high school had so many talented basketball players that he did not even make the varsity team until his senior season, and even then he only managed to start one game. He mainly focused on baseball, his first passion, and he played outfield for the school's team.

== College career ==
=== Essex CC and Temple University ===
After Stewart graduated from high school he enrolled at Essex County College in Downtown Newark, New Jersey. He played basketball during his two seasons there. In his freshman season he averaged 19.9 points per game. The following year, Stewart's sophomore season, he led all junior college players in the United States with a 36.6 points per game average. He scored 1,019 points on the season, was named a regional all-star and was honored as a First Team NJCAA All-American. After graduating from Essex County College, Stewart moved on to play at Temple University in Philadelphia, Pennsylvania. However, he never ended up playing for the school and transferred to the University of Richmond. At Temple, Stewart said that "The coach there (Harry Litwack) already had his squad set, yet I got a scholarship to play, even though I wouldn't have gotten to."

=== University of Richmond ===
Due to NCAA transfer eligibility rules, Stewart was not able to play in any games during the first semester of his junior year for the Spiders, missing the first five games. Richmond went winless during that stretch. Stewart made an immediate impact upon his debut, leading the team to a 75–73 upset victory over Canisius in the team's sixth game. That season, the Spiders finished with an overall record of 8 wins and 16 losses. The University of Richmond's school paper, The Collegian, said that the Spiders may have conceivably not won a game that year had it not been for Stewart. He averaged 30.2 points and 11.9 rebounds per game while shooting 52.3% from the field. At the end of his junior season, Stewart was the leading vote-getter for the All-SoCon Team as well as its player of the year. The Helms Foundation named him an All-American as well. He became junior-eligible to be selected in the 1973 NBA draft following that season, and the Capital Bullets chose Stewart in the fourth round (65th overall).

Despite being drafted to the National Basketball Association, Stewart elected to return to Richmond for his senior season. His scoring diminished to 26.5 points per game, but that is largely because a new teammate, Bob McCurdy, was also a high volume scorer. McCurdy and Stewart led the Spiders to a 16–12 overall record (10–4 in conference play), and the team finished second place in the SoCon. In the 1974 Southern Conference tournament championship game, the Spiders lost to Furman by two points, narrowly missing out on an NCAA tournament berth. Stewart was named the Tournament MVP. The 1973–74 season was the first winning record for Richmond in 16 years. The school was so grateful for being relevant in basketball again that the city proclaimed an "Aron Stewart Day" after the season ended. In addition to 26.5 points he also averaged 12 rebounds per game. In his forty-fourth and final collegiate game as a Richmond Spider, Stewart scored 28 points and grabbed 15 rebounds against William & Mary. Although he did not repeat as the SoCon Player of the Year, he was named a First Team All-SoCon and All-American performer for the second consecutive season. Following his senior season, he was taken in both the 1974 NBA draft as well as the 1974 American Basketball Association Draft. The NBA's Cleveland Cavaliers took him in the sixth round (93rd overall) while the Virginia Squires selected him in the ABA Draft.

== Post college ==
The Cavaliers did not sign Stewart and the Squires cut him, so he took his game overseas to play professionally. He says that he "didn't like it" thus he returned to Richmond and began working in sales; at one point he was also employed by Philip Morris. In the late 1980s, Stewart joined the Richmond Behavioral Health Authority, helping to counsel those with long-standing mental illnesses.

In 2010, the University of Richmond inducted him into their athletics hall of fame. Three years later, in January 2013, the school announced their men's basketball "All-Time Team" and Stewart was one of the 16 honorees.

Stewart died on February 20, 2026, at the age of 75.
