= 1974 Southern Conference men's basketball tournament =

- Classification: Division I
- Season: 1973–74
- Teams: 8
- Site: Richmond Coliseum; Richmond, VA
- Champions: Furman (3rd title)
- Winning coach: Joe Williams (3rd title)
- MVP: Aron Stewart (Richmond)

1973–74 Southern Conference men's basketball standings
	Conf.				Overall
Team	W		L	PCT	W		L	PCT
Furman †	11	–	1	.917	22	–	9	.710
Richmond	10	–	4	.714	16	–	12	.571
Davidson	7	–	3	.700	18	–	9	.667
East Carolina	8	–	6	.571	13	–	12	.520
William & Mary	5	–	6	.455	9	–	18	.333
The Citadel	4	–	9	.308	10	–	14	.417
VMI	3	–	9	.250	6	–	18	.250
Appalachian State	1	–	11	.083	5	–	20	.200
† Southern Conference Tournament winner Rankings from AP Poll

The 1974 Southern Conference men's basketball tournament took place from February 27–March 2, 1974, at the Richmond Coliseum in Richmond, Virginia. The Furman Paladins, led by head coach Joe Williams, won their third Southern Conference title and received the automatic berth to the 1974 NCAA tournament.

== Format ==
All of the conference's eight members were eligible for the tournament. Teams were seeded based on conference winning percentage. The tournament used a preset bracket consisting of three rounds.

== Bracket ==
Quarterfinals; February 27–28
1	Furman	75
8	Appalachian State	60
4	East Carolina	67
5	William & Mary	75**
2	Richmond	69
7	VMI	59
3	Davidson	82
6	The Citadel	69

Semifinals; March 1
1	Furman	70
5	William & Mary	55
2	Richmond	86
3	Davidson	68

Finals; March 2
1	Furman	62
2	Richmond	60

* Overtime game

== See also ==
- List of Southern Conference men's basketball champions
