= 1975 Southern Conference men's basketball tournament =

- Classification: Division I
- Season: 1974–75
- Teams: 8
- Site: Greenville Memorial Auditorium; Greenville, SC
- Champions: Furman (4th title)
- Winning coach: Joe Williams (4th title)

1974–75 Southern Conference men's basketball standings
	Conf.				Overall
Team	W		L	PCT	W		L	PCT
Furman†	12	–	0	1.000	22	–	7	.759
East Carolina	11	–	3	.786	19	–	9	.679
William & Mary	6	–	5	.545	16	–	12	.571
Richmond	7	–	7	.500	10	–	16	.385
VMI	6	–	6	.500	13	–	13	.500
Davidson	4	–	6	.400	7	–	19	.269
The Citadel	2	–	11	.154	5	–	15	.250
Appalachian State	1	–	11	.083	3	–	23	.115
† Southern Conference Tournament winner Rankings from AP Poll

The 1975 Southern Conference men's basketball tournament took place from March 1–6, 1975. The quarterfinal round was hosted at campus sites, while the semifinals and finals were hosted at the Greenville Memorial Auditorium in Greenville, South Carolina. The Furman Paladins, led by head coach Joe Williams, won their fourth Southern Conference title and received the automatic berth to the 1975 NCAA tournament.

== Format ==
All of the conference's eight members were eligible for the tournament. Teams were seeded based on conference winning percentage. The tournament used a preset bracket consisting of three rounds.

== Bracket ==
Quarterfinals; March 1
1	Furman	75
8	Appalachian State	69
4	Richmond	81
5	VMI	85
2	East Carolina	78
7	The Citadel	66
3	William & Mary	78
6	Davidson	64

Semifinals; March 5
1	Furman	94
5	VMI	81
2	East Carolina	66
3	William & Mary	69

Finals; March 6
1	Furman	66
3	William & Mary	55

* Overtime game

== See also ==
- List of Southern Conference men's basketball champions
