= 1975–76 William & Mary Indians men's basketball team =

American college basketball season

1975–76 William & Mary Indians men's basketball
- Conference: Southern Conference
- Record: 15–13 (8–3 SoCon)
- Head coach: George Balanis (2nd season)
- MVP: John Lowenhaupt
- Home arena: William & Mary Hall

1975–76 Southern Conference men's basketball standings
	Conf.				Overall
Team	W		L	PCT	W		L	PCT
VMI†	9	–	3	.750	22	–	10	.688
William & Mary	8	–	3	.727	15	–	13	.536
Richmond	7	–	7	.500	14	–	14	.500
East Carolina	7	–	7	.500	11	–	15	.423
Appalachian State	6	–	6	.500	13	–	14	.481
The Citadel	6	–	7	.462	10	–	17	.370
Furman	5	–	7	.417	9	–	18	.333
Davidson	1	–	9	.100	5	–	21	.192
† Southern Conference Tournament winner Rankings from AP Poll

The 1975–76 William & Mary Indians men's basketball team represented the College of William & Mary in intercollegiate basketball during the 1975–76 NCAA Division I men's basketball season. Under the second year of head coach George Balanis, the team finished the season 15–13 and 8–3 in the Southern Conference. This was the 71st season of the collegiate basketball program at William & Mary, whose nickname is now the Tribe.

The Indians finished in 2nd place in the conference and qualified for the 1976 Southern Conference men's basketball tournament at the Greenville Memorial Auditorium in Greenville, South Carolina. William & Mary defeated Furman in the first round before falling to third-seeded Richmond in the semifinals.

== Season notes ==
- John Lowenhaupt was named to the First Team All-Southern Conference
- Ron Satterthwaite was named to the Second Team All-Southern Conference

== Schedule ==
Date time, TV	Rank^{#}	Opponent^{#}	Result	Record	Site city, state
Regular season
November 29		Appalachian State	W 68–48	1–0 (1–0)	William & Mary Hall; Williamsburg, VA
December 1*		Eastern Connecticut State	W 75–55	2–0	William & Mary Hall; Williamsburg, VA
December 4*		at George Washington	L 69–76	2–1	Charles E. Smith Center; Washington, DC
December 8		The Citadel	W 70–61	3–1 (2–0)	William & Mary Hall; Williamsburg, VA
December 9*		at Wake Forest	L 69–82	3–2	Winston-Salem Memorial Coliseum; Winston-Salem, NC
December 11*		Dickinson	W 61–56	4–2	William & Mary Hall; Williamsburg, VA
January 3*		Wagner	W 80–52	5–2	William & Mary Hall; Williamsburg, VA
January 5*		at Iona	L 64–67 ^{OT}	5–3	Hynes Athletic Center; New Rochelle, NY
January 6*		at Princeton	L 43–64	5–4	Jadwin Gymnasium; Princeton, NJ
January 10*		Washington College	W 105–60	6–4	William & Mary Hall; Williamsburg, VA
January 13*		at Old Dominion	L 73–77	6–5	ODU Fieldhouse; Norfolk, VA
January 17		East Carolina	W 79–43	7–5 (3–0)	William & Mary Hall; Williamsburg, VA
January 19*		Virginia	L 60–80	7–6	William & Mary Hall; Williamsburg, VA
January 20		at No. 20 VMI	L 78–84	7–7 (3–1)	Cormack Field House; Lexington, VA
January 24		at Furman	W 80–68	8–7 (4–1)	Greenville Memorial Auditorium; Greenville, SC
January 28*		at Virginia Tech	L 79–105	8–8	Cassell Coliseum; Blacksburg, VA
January 31		Richmond	L 72–80	8–9 (4–2)	William & Mary Hall; Williamsburg, VA
February 3		at East Carolina	W 56–54	9–9 (5–2)	Williams Arena at Minges Coliseum; Greenville, NC
February 5*		Old Dominion	W 74–61	10–9	William & Mary Hall; Williamsburg, VA
February 7		VMI	W 68–62	11–9 (6–2)	William & Mary Hall; Williamsburg, VA
February 11*		Virginia Tech	L 48–50	11–10	William & Mary Hall; Williamsburg, VA
February 14		at Davidson	W 75–73	12–10 (7–2)	Johnston Gym; Davidson, NC
February 16		at The Citadel	L 62–64	12–11 (7–3)	McAlister Field House; Charleston, SC
February 19*		Pratt	W 70–56	13–11	William & Mary Hall; Williamsburg, VA
February 25		at Richmond	W 107–102	14–11 (8–3)	Robins Center; Richmond, VA
February 25*		No. 3 Rutgers	L 90–100	14–12	William & Mary Hall; Williamsburg, VA
1977 Southern Conference Tournament
February 28		(7) Furman; Quarterfinals	W 70–57	15–12	William & Mary Hall; Williamsburg, VA
March 3		(3) Richmond; Semifinals	L 78–84	15–13	Greenville Memorial Auditorium; Greenville, SC
*Non-conference game. ^{#}Rankings from AP Poll. (#) Tournament seedings in parentheses.
