= 1976–77 William & Mary Indians men's basketball team =

American college basketball season

1976–77 William & Mary Indians men's basketball
- Conference: Southern Conference
- Record: 16–14 (7–4 SoCon)
- Head coach: George Balanis (3rd season)
- Captain: John Lowenhaupt
- Home arena: William & Mary Hall

1976–77 Southern Conference men's basketball standings
	Conf.				Overall
Team	W		L	PCT	W		L	PCT
No. 20 VMI †	8	–	2	.800	26	–	4	.867
Furman	8	–	2	.800	18	–	10	.643
Appalachian State	8	–	4	.667	17	–	12	.586
William & Mary	7	–	4	.636	16	–	14	.533
East Carolina	3	–	9	.250	10	–	18	.357
Davidson	2	–	8	.200	5	–	22	.185
The Citadel	2	–	9	.182	8	–	19	.296
† Southern Conference Tournament winner Rankings from AP Poll

The 1976–77 William & Mary Indians men's basketball team represented the College of William & Mary in intercollegiate basketball during the 1976–77 NCAA Division I men's basketball season. Under the third, and final, year of head coach George Balanis, the team finished the season 16–14 and 7–4 in the Southern Conference. This was the 72nd season of the collegiate basketball program at William & Mary, whose nickname is now the Tribe. This was William & Mary's final season in the Southern Conference before becoming an independent and eventually joining the Colonial Athletic Association.

The Indians finished in 4th place in the conference and qualified for the 1977 Southern Conference men's basketball tournament, where they lost to East Carolina in an opening round game on campus at William & Mary Hall.

== Schedule ==
Date time, TV	Rank^{#}	Opponent^{#}	Result	Record	Site city, state
Regular season
11/29/1976*		Christopher Newport	W 105–51	1–0	William & Mary Hall; Williamsburg, VA
12/1/1976*		Hampden–Sydney	W 92–67	2–0	William & Mary Hall; Williamsburg, VA
12/4/1976		The Citadel	W 94–61	3–0 (1–0)	William & Mary Hall; Williamsburg, VA
12/8/1976*		No. 11 Wake Forest	L 84–90 ^{OT}	3–1	William & Mary Hall (5,100); Williamsburg, VA
12/11/1976		at Appalachian State	L 59–68	3–2 (1–1)	Varsity Gymnasium; Boone, NC
12/22/1976*		at UC Santa Barbara	W 78–65	4–2	Robertson Gymnasium; Santa Barbara, CA
12/23/1976*		at No. 8 UCLA	L 55–59	4–3	Pauley Pavilion; Los Angeles, CA
12/27/1976*		at Hawaii; Rainbow Classic	L 60–63	4–4	Honolulu International Center; Honolulu, HI
12/28/1976*		vs. Illinois; Rainbow Classic	L 60–63	4–5	Honolulu International Center; Honolulu, HI
12/29/1976*		vs. Temple; Rainbow Classic	W 68–65	5–5	Honolulu International Center; Honolulu, HI
1/8/1977		Appalachian State	W 68–63	6–5 (2–1)	William & Mary Hall; Williamsburg, VA
1/10/1977*		at Virginia	W 71–65	7–5	University Hall; Charlottesville, VA
1/12/1977		at VMI	L 79–92	7–6 (2–2)	Cormack Field House; Lexington, VA
1/15/1977*		at Richmond	W 67–62	8–6	Robins Center; Richmond, VA
1/18/1977		East Carolina	W 79–43	9–6 (3–2)	William & Mary Hall; Williamsburg, VA
1/20/1977*		Queens College	W 91–41	10–6	William & Mary Hall; Williamsburg, VA
1/22/1977		at Furman	L 83–88 ^{OT}	10–7 (3–3)	Greenville Memorial Auditorium; Greenville, SC
1/24/1977		at The Citadel	W 61–53	11–7 (4–3)	McAlister Field House; Charleston, SC
1/26/1977*		Princeton	L 38–42	11–8	William & Mary Hall; Williamsburg, VA
1/29/1977*		Navy	W 70–56	12–8	William & Mary Hall; Williamsburg, VA
1/31/1977		at Davidson	L 52–69	12–9 (4–4)	Johnston Gym; Davidson, NC
2/2/1977*		George Washington	W 83–70	13–9	William & Mary Hall; Williamsburg, VA
2/5/1977*		Old Dominion	L 71–73	13–10	William & Mary Hall; Williamsburg, VA
2/7/1977*		vs. West Virginia	L 58–69	13–11	Charleston Civic Center; Charleston, WV
2/10/1977		at East Carolina	W 70–66	14–11 (5–4)	Williams Arena at Minges Coliseum; Greenville, NC
2/12/1977		Davidson	W 68–60	15–11 (6–4)	William & Mary Hall; Williamsburg, VA
2/16/1977		No. 19 VMI	W 86–84	16–11 (7–4)	William & Mary Hall; Williamsburg, VA
2/19/1977*		Richmond	L 77–78	16–12	William & Mary Hall; Williamsburg, VA
2/21/1977*		at Old Dominion	L 68–82	16–13	ODU Fieldhouse; Norfolk, VA
1977 Southern Conference Tournament
2/26/1977		(5) East Carolina; Quarterfinals	L 76–79	16–14	William & Mary Hall; Williamsburg, VA
*Non-conference game. ^{#}Rankings from AP Poll. (#) Tournament seedings in parentheses.
