= 1977 Southern Conference men's basketball tournament =

- Classification: Division I
- Season: 1976–77
- Teams: 7
- Site: Roanoke Civic Center; Roanoke, VA
- Champions: VMI (3rd title)
- Winning coach: Charlie Schmaus (1st title)

1976–77 Southern Conference men's basketball standings
	Conf.				Overall
Team	W		L	PCT	W		L	PCT
No. 20 VMI †	8	–	2	.800	26	–	4	.867
Furman	8	–	2	.800	18	–	10	.643
Appalachian State	8	–	4	.667	17	–	12	.586
William & Mary	7	–	4	.636	16	–	14	.533
East Carolina	3	–	9	.250	10	–	18	.357
Davidson	2	–	8	.200	5	–	22	.185
The Citadel	2	–	9	.182	8	–	19	.296
† Southern Conference Tournament winner Rankings from AP Poll

The 1977 Southern Conference men's basketball tournament took place from February 26–March 2, 1977. The quarterfinal round was hosted at campus sites, while the semifinals and finals were hosted at the Roanoke Civic Center in Roanoke, Virginia. The VMI Keydets, led by head coach Charlie Schmaus, won their third Southern Conference title and received the automatic berth to the 1977 NCAA tournament.

== Format ==
All of the conference's seven members were eligible for the tournament. Teams were seeded based on conference winning percentage. The tournament used a preset bracket consisting of three rounds, the first of which featured three games, with the winners advancing to the semifinals.

== Bracket ==
Quarterfinals; February 26
4	William & Mary	76
5	East Carolina	79
2	Furman	76
7	The Citadel	69
3	Appalachian State	71
6	Davidson	66

Semifinals; March 1
1	VMI	88
5	East Carolina	77
2	Furman	64
3	Appalachian State	70

Finals; March 2
1	VMI	69*
3	Appalachian State	67

* Overtime game

== See also ==
- List of Southern Conference men's basketball champions
