= 1972 Southern Conference men's basketball tournament =

- Classification: Division I
- Teams: 8
- Site: Greenville Memorial Auditorium; Greenville, SC
- Champions: East Carolina (1st title)
- Winning coach: Tom Quinn (1st title)

1971–72 Southern Conference men's basketball standings
	Conf.				Overall
Team	W		L	PCT	W		L	PCT
Davidson	8	–	2	.800	19	–	9	.679
Furman	8	–	3	.727	17	–	11	.607
William & Mary	6	–	4	.600	10	–	17	.370
East Carolina †	7	–	5	.583	14	–	15	.483
The Citadel	5	–	6	.455	12	–	13	.480
Richmond	3	–	9	.250	6	–	19	.240
VMI	2	–	10	.167	6	–	19	.240
† Southern Conference Tournament winner Rankings from AP Poll

The 1972 Southern Conference men's basketball tournament took place from March 2–4, 1972 at the Greenville Memorial Auditorium in Greenville, South Carolina. The East Carolina Pirates, led by head coach Tom Quinn, won their first Southern Conference title and received the automatic berth to the 1972 NCAA tournament.

== Format ==
All of the conference's eight members were eligible for the tournament. Teams were seeded based on conference winning percentage. The tournament used a preset bracket consisting of three rounds.

== Bracket ==
Quarterfinals; March 2
1	Davidson	87
8	Appalachian State	77
4	East Carolina	80
5	The Citadel	71
2	Furman	126
7	VMI	80
3	William & Mary	98
6	Richmond	82

Semifinals; March 3
1	Davidson	77
4	East Carolina	81
2	Furman	93
3	William & Mary	74

Finals; March 4
2	Furman	75
4	East Carolina	77*

* Overtime game

== See also ==
- List of Southern Conference men's basketball champions
