= Terry Holland =

American athletics administrator and basketball coach (1942–2023)

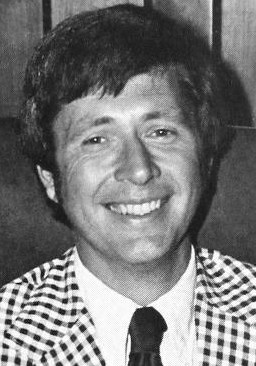
- Holland, circa 1974

Biographical details
- Born: April 2, 1942; Clinton, North Carolina, U.S.
- Died: February 26, 2023 (aged 80); Charlottesville, Virginia, U.S.

Playing career
- 1961–1964: Davidson
- Position: Forward

Coaching career (HC unless noted)
- 1964–1969: Davidson (assistant)
- 1969–1974: Davidson
- 1974–1990: Virginia

Administrative career (AD unless noted)
- 1990–1994: Davidson
- 1994–2001: Virginia
- 2004–2013: East Carolina
- 2013–2023: East Carolina (emeritus AD)

Head coaching record
- Overall: 418–216
- Tournaments: 15–10 (NCAA Division I); 8–4 (NIT)

Accomplishments and honors

Championships
- 2 NCAA Regional – Final Four (1981, 1984); NIT (1980); SoCon tournament (1970); 4 SoCon regular season (1970–1973); ACC tournament (1976); 3 ACC regular season (1981–1983)

Awards
- 3× SoCon Coach of the Year (1970–1972); 2× ACC Coach of the Year (1981, 1982)

Michael Terrence Holland (April 2, 1942 – February 26, 2023) was an American college athletics administrator and basketball player and coach. Holland served as the head men's basketball coach at Davidson College from 1969 to 1974 and at the University of Virginia from 1974 to 1990, compiling a career college basketball coaching record of 418–216. Following his retirement from coaching, Holland was the athletic director at Davidson from 1990 to 1994, at Virginia from 1994 to 2001, and at East Carolina from 2004 to 2013.

== Coaching career ==
=== Davidson ===
Holland went to Davidson College and graduated with a Bachelor of Arts degree in economics in 1964. While at Davidson, Holland lettered in basketball for three years. His coach at Davidson was the legendary coach Lefty Driesell. During his senior season in 1963–64, Holland served as captain of the first nationally ranked basketball team in Wildcat history and topped the nation in field goal percentage (63.1). After graduating in 1964 he stayed at Davidson to become an assistant coach. Holland's 1966–67 freshmen team went 16–0. Five years later, in 1969, he was promoted to head coach for the Wildcats. Showing his distinction as a coach, Holland was selected as the Southern Conference Coach of the Year three times.

=== Virginia ===
On April 1, 1974, Holland became the University of Virginia's head men's basketball coach. While coaching at Virginia, he was responsible for signing the nation's top-ranked high school basketball player, seven-foot-four-inch Ralph Sampson, who went on to become a three-time consensus collegiate national player-of-the-year as a Cavalier. As a Cavalier, Holland accumulated a winning record of 326–173, becoming the winningest men's basketball coach in Virginia history (surpassed in 2023 by Tony Bennett). His tenure at Virginia also included a pair of Final Four appearances (1981 and 1984), a National Invitation Tournament title (1980), Virginia's first of three ACC tournament championships (1976), and two Atlantic Coast Conference Coach of the Year awards.

== Athletic director career ==
=== Davidson ===
In 1990, Holland returned to Davidson College to become the athletic director. While at Davidson, his efforts helped to modernize Davidson's athletics strategy. Holland co-chaired the Presidential Working Group on Athletic Policy that developed a new policy for athletics which was implemented in 1992 by the Davidson Board of Trustees. Holland oversaw Davidson's move back into the Southern Conference.

Holland also re-organized the Davidson Athletic Foundation, which resulted in the increase of fund-raising from $350,000 to $1,000,000. In addition, under his direction, Davidson hosted and sold-out the NCAA Division I Men's Soccer Championship for three consecutive seasons. Davidson also captured the first Barrett-Bonner Award, which recognizes the Southern Conference institution with the highest percentage of its student-athletes on the conference academic honor roll.

=== Virginia ===
In 1995, Holland returned to the University of Virginia to take on the athletic director position. One of the lasting legacies Holland left in Charlottesville was the facility expansion. With the help of generous alumni, Holland initiatives include: the $86 million expansion of Scott Stadium and creation of the Carl Smith Center; construction of the Aquatics and Fitness Center, home to Virginia's swimming and diving teams and one of the nation's top collegiate recreation facilities; expansion and naming of the Sheridan Snyder Tennis Center; the University Hall Turf Field; and The Park, home to the Cavalier softball team.

In 1998–99, Virginia achieved its then highest ever finish in the Sears Directors Cup, an all-sports competition among NCAA Division I universities based on their performance in NCAA championships, taking eighth nationally. In 1999, The Charlotte Observer named Holland one of the 50 most influential figures in ACC basketball history.

In 2001, Holland stepped down from the AD position and was appointed a Special Assistant to the President of the University of Virginia.

=== East Carolina ===
On September 8, 2004, East Carolina University officially announced Terry Holland as the new Athletics Director. The job officially began on October 1. He agreed to a five-year contract worth $276,000 the first year. On November 17, 2004, East Carolina announced that football coach John Thompson would not return for the 2005 season. To beef up the football program, Holland hired Skip Holtz as the new football coach on December 3, 2004. Continuing with the turnaround, on Feb 22, 2005, it was announced that Bill Herrion would not remain as head men's basketball coach after the season. At the time, Herrion was 69–96 in six seasons at ECU. On March 16, 2005, Holland hired South Carolina assistant Ricky Stokes, a former head coach at Virginia Tech, to be the men's basketball coach. Stokes played for Holland at Virginia. Also in 2005, Head Baseball Coach, Randy Mazey, resigned and was later replaced by Louisburg Coach Billy Godwin.

Holland announced on June 23, 2005, a new policy in scheduling football opponents and scheduled future home and homes with in-state rivals North Carolina State and North Carolina, plus the University of Virginia, West Virginia, and Virginia Tech. Holland also scheduled the first ever men's basketball home game with an ACC opponent as Wake Forest visited Greenville in 2007. Holland was also instrumental in raising funding for a new football practice complex and new football meeting rooms, all through a fund raising campaign called the "Circle of Excellence". Holland announced future expansion plans of ECU's Dowdy Ficklen Stadium in the summer of 2005. Tentative plans include expanding seating capacity to 50,000 and constructing a new multi-story football building/press box complex. Holland and his athletic staff ended the Men's soccer team late in 2005. On January 11, 2006, Chancellor Ballard announced that Holland's contract was extended to 2011 and he assumed an additional role, "Executive Assistant to the Chancellor".

On December 12, 2012, Holland announced that he would be retiring and leaving his position as athletic director of East Carolina University, and would be assuming the title of emeritus director of athletics. In addition, the East Carolina University board of trustees announced that it would name the school's 4-venue Olympic Sport Complex after Holland.

== Other work ==
Holland was also a television analyst, working primarily for ESPN and the ACC Television Network from 1990 to 1996, handling approximately 20 games per year. Holland was a member of the NCAA Basketball Committee, chairing the panel in 1997. He served on the Senior National Team Committee of USA Basketball from 1992 through 1996, and chaired the organization's Collegiate Committee, which he served on from 1997.

== Legacy ==
One of Holland's assistants at both Davidson and Virginia was Jim Larrañaga, who became a media darling in 2006 as the head coach at George Mason after leading the Patriots to an improbable berth in that season's Final Four. Other former players and/or assistants who went on to become Division I or NBA head coaches are Marc Iavaroni, Bill Cofield, Mike Schuler, Rick Carlisle, Barry Parkhill, Richard Schmidt, Anthony Solomon, Seth Greenberg, Jeff Jones, Dave Odom, and Ricky Stokes.

Holland was inducted into the Virginia Sports Hall of Fame in 2003. At the time of his induction, the Hall noted that he "has a name synonymous with excellence. His coaching and administrative achievements are a testament to his character and dedication to sports. His influence on the University of Virginia's athletic program has made him a prominent role model in Virginia sports history. Terry Holland’s induction into the Virginia Sports Hall of Fame is a fitting tribute for a talented athlete who became a successful coach and a dedicated, visionary leader."

== Personal life and death ==
Holland's wife was named Ann. They had two daughters, Ann-Michael and Kate, as well as three grandchildren. Holland was Presbyterian, and in his spare time he was an avid fisherman and boater.

Holland died from complications of Alzheimer's disease on February 26, 2023, at the age of 80.

== Head coaching record ==
Record table
Season	Team	Overall	Conference	Standing	Postseason
Davidson Wildcats (Southern Conference) (1969–1974)
1969–70	Davidson	22–5	10–0	1st	NCAA University Division first round
1970–71	Davidson	15–11	9–1	1st	
1971–72	Davidson	19–9	8–2	1st	NIT first round
1972–73	Davidson	18–9	9–1	1st	
1973–74	Davidson	18–9	7–3	3rd	
Davidson:		92–43	43–7		
Virginia Cavaliers (Atlantic Coast Conference) (1974–1990)
1974–75	Virginia	12–13	4–8	5th	
1975–76	Virginia	18–12	4–8	6th	NCAA Division I first round
1976–77	Virginia	12–17	2–10	T–6th	
1977–78	Virginia	20–8	6–6	T–4th	NIT first round
1978–79	Virginia	19–10	7–5	3rd	NIT second round
1979–80	Virginia	24–10	7–7	T–5th	NIT champion
1980–81	Virginia	29–4	13–1	1st	NCAA Division I Final Four
1981–82	Virginia	30–4	12–2	T–1st	NCAA Division I Sweet Sixteen
1982–83	Virginia	29–5	12–2	T–1st	NCAA Division I Elite Eight
1983–84	Virginia	21–12	6–8	T–5th	NCAA Division I Final Four
1984–85	Virginia	17–16	3–11	8th	NIT quarterfinal
1985–86	Virginia	19–11	7–7	T–4th	NCAA Division I first round
1986–87	Virginia	21–10	8–6	4th	NCAA Division I first round
1987–88	Virginia	13–18	5–9	6th	
1988–89	Virginia	22–11	9–5	T–2nd	NCAA Division I Elite Eight
1989–90	Virginia	20–12	6–8	T–5th	NCAA Division I second round
Virginia:		326–173	111–103		
Total:		418–216			
National champion Postseason invitational champion Conference regular season champion Conference regular season and conference tournament champion Division regular season champion Division regular season and conference tournament champion Conference tournament champion

== See also ==
- List of NCAA Division I Men's Final Four appearances by coach
