= 1976 Southern Conference men's basketball tournament =

- Classification: Division I
- Season: 1975–76
- Teams: 8
- Site: Greenville Memorial Auditorium; Greenville, SC
- Champions: VMI (2nd title)
- Winning coach: Bill Blair (1st title)

1975–76 Southern Conference men's basketball standings
	Conf.				Overall
Team	W		L	PCT	W		L	PCT
VMI†	9	–	3	.750	22	–	10	.688
William & Mary	8	–	3	.727	15	–	13	.536
Richmond	7	–	7	.500	14	–	14	.500
East Carolina	7	–	7	.500	11	–	15	.423
Appalachian State	6	–	6	.500	13	–	14	.481
The Citadel	6	–	7	.462	10	–	17	.370
Furman	5	–	7	.417	9	–	18	.333
Davidson	1	–	9	.100	5	–	21	.192
† Southern Conference Tournament winner Rankings from AP Poll

The 1976 Southern Conference men's basketball tournament took place from February 28–March 4, 1976. The quarterfinal round was hosted at campus sites, while the semifinals and finals were hosted at the Greenville Memorial Auditorium in Greenville, South Carolina. The VMI Keydets, led by head coach Bill Blair, won their second Southern Conference title and received the automatic berth to the 1976 NCAA tournament.

== Format ==
All of the conference's eight members were eligible for the tournament. Teams were seeded based on conference winning percentage. The tournament used a preset bracket consisting of three rounds.

== Bracket ==
Quarterfinals; February 28
1	VMI	71
8	Davidson	69
4	East Carolina	72
5	Appalachian State	79
2	William & Mary	70
7	Furman	57
3	Richmond	82
6	The Citadel	69

Semifinals; March 3
1	VMI	71
5	Appalachian State	64
2	William & Mary	78
3	Richmond	84

Finals; March 4
1	VMI	41
3	Richmond	33

* Overtime game

== See also ==
- List of Southern Conference men's basketball champions
