= 1970 Southern Conference men's basketball tournament =

- Classification: Division I
- Season: 1969–70
- Teams: 8
- Site: Charlotte Coliseum; Charlotte, NC
- Champions: Davidson (4th title)
- Winning coach: Terry Holland (1st title)

1969–70 Southern Conference men's basketball standings
	Conf.				Overall
Team	W		L	PCT	W		L	PCT
No. 15 Davidson †	10	–	0	1.000	22	–	5	.815
East Carolina	9	–	2	.818	16	–	10	.615
George Washington	6	–	4	.600	12	–	15	.444
Furman	5	–	6	.455	13	–	13	.500
William & Mary	5	–	7	.417	11	–	16	.407
The Citadel	4	–	8	.333	8	–	16	.333
Richmond	4	–	9	.308	9	–	18	.333
VMI	3	–	10	.231	6	–	19	.240
† Tournament winner As of April 30, 1970; Rankings from AP Poll

The 1970 Southern Conference men's basketball tournament took place from February 27–March 1, 1970, at the original Charlotte Coliseum in Charlotte, North Carolina. The Davidson Wildcats, led by head coach Terry Holland, won their fourth Southern Conference title and received the automatic berth to the 1970 NCAA tournament.

== Format ==
All of the conference's eight members were eligible for the tournament. Teams were seeded based on conference winning percentage. The tournament used a preset bracket consisting of three rounds.

== Bracket ==
Quarterfinals; February 27
1	#11 Davidson	72
8	VMI	46
4	Furman	67
5	William & Mary	82
2	East Carolina	73
7	Richmond	75
3	George Washington	66
6	The Citadel	64

Semifinals; February 28
1	#11 Davidson	78
5	William & Mary	54
3	George Washington	69
7	Richmond	77

Finals; March 1
1	#11 Davidson	81
7	Richmond	61

* Overtime game

== See also ==
- List of Southern Conference men's basketball champions
