= 1978 Southern Conference men's basketball tournament =

- Classification: Division I
- Season: 1977–78
- Teams: 8
- Site: Roanoke Civic Center; Roanoke, VA
- Champions: Furman (5th title)
- Winning coach: Joe Williams (5th title)

1977–78 Southern Conference men's basketball standings
	Conf.				Overall
Team	W		L	PCT	W		L	PCT
Appalachian State	9	–	3	.750	15	–	13	.536
VMI	7	–	3	.700	21	–	7	.750
Marshall	8	–	5	.615	14	–	15	.483
Furman †	7	–	5	.583	19	–	11	.633
Chattanooga	7	–	5	.583	16	–	11	.593
Western Carolina	4	–	8	.333	7	–	19	.269
Davidson	3	–	7	.300	9	–	18	.333
The Citadel	2	–	11	.154	8	–	19	.296
† 1978 Southern Conference tournament winner Rankings from AP Poll

The 1978 Southern Conference men's basketball tournament took place from February 25–March 4, 1978. The quarterfinal round was hosted at campus sites, while the semifinals and finals were hosted at the Roanoke Civic Center in Roanoke, Virginia. The Furman Paladins, led by head coach Joe Williams, won their fifth Southern Conference title and received the automatic berth to the 1978 NCAA tournament.

== Format ==
All of the conference's eight members were eligible for the tournament. Teams were seeded based on conference winning percentage. The tournament used a preset bracket consisting of three rounds.

== Bracket ==
Quarterfinals; February 25
1	Appalachian State	81
8	The Citadel	64
4	Furman	83
5	Chattanooga	73
2	VMI	95
7	Davidson	80
3	Marshall	64
6	Western Carolina	56

Semifinals; March 3
1	Appalachian State	68
4	Furman	72
2	VMI	71
3	Marshall	76

Finals; March 4
3	Marshall	53
4	Furman	69

* Overtime game

== See also ==
- List of Southern Conference men's basketball champions
