= 1973 Southern Conference men's basketball tournament =

- Classification: Division I
- Teams: 8
- Site: Richmond Coliseum; Richmond, VA
- Champions: Furman (2nd title)
- Winning coach: Joe Williams (2nd title)

1972–73 Southern Conference men's basketball standings
	Conf.				Overall
Team	W		L	PCT	W		L	PCT
Davidson	9	–	1	.900	18	–	9	.667
Furman †	11	–	2	.846	20	–	9	.690
East Carolina	7	–	7	.500	13	–	13	.500
The Citadel	6	–	7	.462	11	–	15	.423
William & Mary	5	–	6	.455	10	–	17	.370
Richmond	5	–	9	.357	8	–	16	.333
Appalachian State	3	–	8	.273	6	–	20	.231
VMI	3	–	9	.250	6	–	20	.231
† Southern Conference Tournament winner Rankings from AP Poll

The 1973 Southern Conference men's basketball tournament took place from March 1–3, 1973 at the Richmond Coliseum in Richmond, Virginia. The Furman Paladins, led by head coach Joe Williams, won their second Southern Conference title and received the automatic berth to the 1973 NCAA tournament.

== Format ==
All of the conference's eight members were eligible for the tournament. Teams were seeded based on conference winning percentage. The tournament used a preset bracket consisting of three rounds.

== Bracket ==
Quarterfinals; March 1
1	Davidson	88
8	VMI	77
4	The Citadel	72
5	William & Mary	97
2	Furman	101
7	Appalachian State	68
3	East Carolina	96
6	Richmond	62

Semifinals; March 2
1	Davidson	79
5	William & Mary	76
2	Furman	68
3	East Carolina	60

Finals; March 3
1	Davidson	81
2	Furman	99

* Overtime game

== See also ==
- List of Southern Conference men's basketball champions
