= 1971 Southern Conference men's basketball tournament =

American men's basketball tournament

- Classification: Division I
- Season: 1970–71
- Teams: 7
- Site: Charlotte Coliseum; Charlotte, NC
- Champions: Furman (1st title)
- Winning coach: Joe Williams (1st title)

1970–71 Southern Conference men's basketball standings
	Conf.				Overall
Team	W		L	PCT	W		L	PCT
Davidson	9	–	1	.900	15	–	11	.577
William & Mary	7	–	3	.700	11	–	16	.407
East Carolina	7	–	4	.636	13	–	12	.520
The Citadel	6	–	5	.545	13	–	12	.520
Furman †	5	–	5	.500	15	–	12	.556
Richmond	3	–	9	.250	7	–	21	.250
VMI	1	–	11	.083	1	–	25	.038
† Southern Conference Tournament winner Rankings from AP Poll

The 1971 Southern Conference men's basketball tournament took place from March 4–6, 1971 at the original Charlotte Coliseum in Charlotte, North Carolina. The Furman Paladins, led by head coach Joe Williams, won their first Southern Conference title and received the automatic berth to the 1971 NCAA tournament.

== Format ==
All of the conference's seven members were eligible for the tournament. Teams were seeded based on conference winning percentage. The tournament used a preset bracket consisting of three rounds, with the top finisher receiving a first-round bye.

== Bracket ==
Quarterfinals; March 4
4	The Citadel	82
5	Furman	95
2	William & Mary	69
7	VMI	65
3	East Carolina	67
6	Richmond	69

Semifinals; March 5
1	Davidson	79
5	Furman	83
2	William & Mary	64
6	Richmond	66

Finals; March 6
5	Furman	68
6	Richmond	61

* Overtime game

== See also ==
- List of Southern Conference men's basketball champions
