= Reynolds Gymnasium =

Arena in Winston-Salem, North Carolina

- Interactive map of Reynolds Gymnasium
- Coordinates: 36°8′4″N 80°16′33″W
- Owner: Wake Forest University
- Operator: Wake Forest University
- Capacity: 1,500

Construction
- Opened: March 1956

Tenants
- Wake Forest Demon Deacons (w. basketball) (1956–1989); Wake Forest Demon Deacons (volleyball) (1971–present)

Reynolds Gymnasium is a multi-purpose arena located in Winston-Salem, North Carolina on the campus of Wake Forest University. The arena was completed in March 1956 after the university relocated to Winston-Salem from its namesake town in Wake County.

Originally the home of Wake Forest women's (and on rare occasions, men's) basketball, Reynolds Gym currently plays host to the women's volleyball program, something it has done since 1971. The basketball teams now call Lawrence Joel Veterans Memorial Coliseum, adjacent to the Carolina Classic Fairgrounds, home.

In addition to the gym's purpose as a volleyball venue it also houses health and exercise science offices and labs, ROTC rooms, and a sports medicine center.
