= The Collegian (University of Richmond) =

Student newspaper of the University of Richmond

- Front page of The Collegian on October 9, 2008
- Type: Student newspaper
- Owner: University of Richmond
- Editor-in-chief: Ava Jenks
- Founded: 1914
- Language: English
- Headquarters: University of Richmond; Richmond, VA; United States
- Website: www.thecollegianur.com

The Collegian is the student newspaper of the University of Richmond in Richmond, Virginia. It was established in 1902 as a weekly and has been published continuously since 1914.

== Overview ==
The Collegian was established in 1902 as a weekly for the Richmond and Westhampton colleges community and has been published continuously since 1914. It is available in online format only, having dropped its print edition in Spring 2014.

The editorial board of Collegian is primarily staffed by students in the University of Richmond's undergraduate journalism program. The Boatwright Memorial Library has a near complete digital archive of Collegian issues from 1914 to 2013.
