= 1977–78 Furman Paladins men's basketball team =

1977–78 Furman Paladins men's basketball

SoCon tournament champions

NCAA tournament, First round
- Conference: Southern Conference
- Record: 19–11 (7–5 SoCon)
- Head coach: Joe Williams (8th season)
- Home arena: Greenville Memorial Auditorium

1977–78 Southern Conference men's basketball standings
	Conf.				Overall
Team	W		L	PCT	W		L	PCT
Appalachian State	9	–	3	.750	15	–	13	.536
VMI	7	–	3	.700	21	–	7	.750
Marshall	8	–	5	.615	14	–	15	.483
Furman †	7	–	5	.583	19	–	11	.633
Chattanooga	7	–	5	.583	16	–	11	.593
Western Carolina	4	–	8	.333	7	–	19	.269
Davidson	3	–	7	.300	9	–	18	.333
The Citadel	2	–	11	.154	8	–	19	.296
† 1978 Southern Conference tournament winner Rankings from AP Poll

The 1977–78 Furman Paladins men's basketball team represented Furman University in the 1977–78 NCAA Division I men's basketball season. The Paladins, led by eighth-year head coach Joe Williams, played their home games at Greenville Memorial Auditorium in Greenville, South Carolina, as members of the Southern Conference. They finished the regular season with a 7–5 record in SoCon play, to finish in fourth place. In the SoCon tournament, they defeated VMI, and East Tennessee State, and Marshall to win the title and make the NCAA tournament. In the opening round, the Paladins were narrowly beaten by Indiana, 63–62, to finish the season at 19–11.

== Roster ==
1977–78 Furman Paladins men's basketball team
Players	Coaches
Pos. / # / Name / Height / Weight / Year / Hometown; PF / 25 / Jonathan Moore / 6 ft 8 in (2.03 m) / 205 lb (93 kg) / So / Charleston, South Carolina	Head coach: Eddie Holbrook; Assistant coach(es) Legend: (C) Team captain; (S) Suspended; (I) Ineligible; (W) Walk-on; Injured; Current redshirt; Roster

== Schedule and results ==
Date time, TV	Rank^{#}	Opponent^{#}	Result	Record	Site (attendance) city, state
Regular season
Nov 30, 1977*		Clemson	L 83–101	0–1	Memorial Auditorium; Greenville, South Carolina
Dec 13, 1977*		at Appalachian State	L 75–85	0–2	Varsity Gymnasium; Boone, North Carolina
Dec 17, 1977*		at Western Carolina	W 110–91	1–2	Reid Gymnasium; Cullowhee, North Carolina
Dec 20, 1977*		at Georgia	W 92–83	2–2	Stegeman Coliseum; Athens, Georgia
Feb 20, 1978*		South Carolina	L 70–76	16–10	Memorial Auditorium; Greenville, South Carolina
SoCon tournament
Feb 25, 1978*		Chattanooga; Quarterfinals	W 83–73	17–10	Memorial Auditorium; Greenville, South Carolina
Feb 26, 1978*		vs. Appalachian State; Semifinals	W 72–68	18–10	Roanoke Civic Center; Roanoke, Virginia
Feb 27, 1978*		vs. Marshall; Championship game	W 69–53	19–10	Roanoke Civic Center; Roanoke, Virginia
NCAA tournament
Mar 12, 1978*		vs. Indiana; First round	L 62–63	19–11	Charlotte Coliseum; Charlotte, North Carolina
*Non-conference game. ^{#}Rankings from AP poll. (#) Tournament seedings in parentheses. E=East. All times are in Eastern.
