= Joe Williams (basketball) =

American college basketball coach (1934–2022)

Biographical details
- Born: 1934; Morton, Mississippi, U.S.
- Died: March 26, 2022 (aged 88); Enterprise, Mississippi, U.S.
- Education: Tulane University

Coaching career (HC unless noted)
- 1959–1960: Parker JHS (FL)
- 1960–1962: Ribault HS (FL)
- 1962–1963: Florida State (assistant)
- 1963–1964: Furman (assistant)
- 1964–1970: Jacksonville
- 1970–1978: Furman
- 1978–1986: Florida State

Head coaching record
- Overall: 363–253 (.589) (college)
- Tournaments: 6–8 (NCAA Division I); 0–1 (NAIA); 1–1 (NIT)

Accomplishments and honors

Championships
- NCAA Regional—Final Four (1970); 3 SoCon regular season (1974, 1975, 1977); 5 SoCon tournament (1971, 1973–1975, 1978)

Awards
- SoCon Coach of the Year (1973)

Joe Williams (1934 – March 26, 2022) was an American men's college basketball coach. He was the head coach at Jacksonville University from 1964 to 1970, Furman University from 1970 to 1978, and Florida State University from 1978 to 1986.

== Career ==
Williams notably led Artis Gilmore and the Dolphins of Jacksonville University to the final game of the 1970 NCAA tournament, where they lost 80–69 to Sidney Wicks and the UCLA Bruins, coached by John Wooden. Williams elected to leave the program after the loss for a more lucrative deal with Furman.

During his eight-year tenure (1970-1978) at Furman, the Paladins made it to the NCAA Tournament five times (1970–71, 1972–73, 1973–74, 1974–75 and 1977–78); won the Southern Conference Tournament five times (1970–71, 1972–73, 1973–74, 1974–75 and 1977–78) and the regular-season SoCon title three times (1973–74, 1974–75 and 1976–77).

During his lifetime, Williams was one of only 25 head coaches to have led three different teams to the NCAA tournament. He is a 1994 inductee of the Jacksonville University athletic hall of fame, and a 1996 inductee of the Furman University Athletic Hall of Fame.

== Personal life ==
Williams' son, Blake, was an assistant basketball coach at Furman University in 2010. A nephew, Brian Johnson, was an MLB pitcher. Williams died on March 26, 2022, from cancer at the age of 88.

== Head coaching record ==
Record table
Season	Team	Overall	Conference	Standing	Postseason
Jacksonville Dolphins (NAIA Independent) (1964–1966)
1964–65	Jacksonville	15–11			NAIA First Round
1965–66	Jacksonville	12–11			
Jacksonville Dolphins (NCAA University Division Independent) (1966–1970)
1966–67	Jacksonville	8–17			
1967–68	Jacksonville	13–13			
1968–69	Jacksonville	17–7			
1969–70	Jacksonville	27–2			NCAA University Division Runner-up
Jacksonville:		92–61 (.601)			
Furman Paladins (Southern Conference) (1970–1978)
1970–71	Furman	15–12	5–5	5th	NCAA University Division First Round
1971–72	Furman	17–11	8–3	2nd	
1972–73	Furman	20–9	11–2	2nd	NCAA University Division First Round
1973–74	Furman	22–9	11–1	1st	NCAA Division I Sweet 16
1974–75	Furman	22–7	12–0	1st	NCAA Division I First Round
1975–76	Furman	9–18	5–7	7th	
1976–77	Furman	18–10	8–2	T–1st	
1977–78	Furman	19–11	7–5	T–4th	NCAA Division I First Round
Furman:		142–87 (.620)	67–25 (.728)		
Florida State Seminoles (Metro Conference) (1978–1986)
1978–79	Florida State	19–10	7–3	2nd	
1979–80	Florida State	22–9	7–5	3rd	NCAA Division I Second Round
1980–81	Florida State	17–11	7–5	2nd	
1981–82	Florida State	11–17	4–8	T–5th	
1982–83	Florida State	14–14	5–7	5th	
1983–84	Florida State	20–11	9–5	3rd	NIT Second Round
1984–85	Florida State	14–16	4–10	7th	
1985–86	Florida State	12–17	3–9	6th	
Florida State:		129–105 (.551)	46–52 (.469)		
Total:		363–253 (.589)			
National champion Postseason invitational champion Conference regular season champion Conference regular season and conference tournament champion Division regular season champion Division regular season and conference tournament champion Conference tournament champion

== See also ==
- List of NCAA Division I Men's Final Four appearances by coach
