= The Citadel Bulldogs basketball, 1970–1974 =

The Citadel Bulldogs basketball teams represented The Citadel, The Military College of South Carolina in Charleston, South Carolina, United States. The program was established in 1900–01, and has continuously fielded a team since 1912–13. Their primary rivals are College of Charleston, Furman and VMI.

== 1969–70 ==
1969–70 The Citadel Bulldogs men's basketball
- Conference: Southern Conference
- Record: 8–16 (4–9 SoCon)
- Head coach: Dick Campbell
- Home arena: The Citadel Armory

1969–70 Southern Conference men's basketball standings
	Conf.				Overall
Team	W		L	PCT	W		L	PCT
No. 15 Davidson †	10	–	0	1.000	22	–	5	.815
East Carolina	9	–	2	.818	16	–	10	.615
George Washington	6	–	4	.600	12	–	15	.444
Furman	5	–	6	.455	13	–	13	.500
William & Mary	5	–	7	.417	11	–	16	.407
The Citadel	4	–	8	.333	8	–	16	.333
Richmond	4	–	9	.308	9	–	18	.333
VMI	3	–	10	.231	6	–	19	.240
† Tournament winner As of April 30, 1970; Rankings from AP Poll

Date time, TV	Opponent	Result	Record	Site city, state
December 1*	at Vanderbilt	L 58–89	0–1	Memorial Gymnasium; Nashville, Tennessee
December 3	Wofford	W 87–75	1–1	The Citadel Armory; Charleston, South Carolina
December 6*	at NC State	L 59–105	1–2	Reynolds Coliseum; Raleigh, North Carolina
December 10	Merchant Marine	W 84–74	2–2	The Citadel Armory; Charleston, South Carolina
December 13	Arkansas State	L 72–81	2–3	The Citadel Armory; Charleston, South Carolina
December 16	Sewanee	W 86–65	3–3	The Citadel Armory; Charleston, South Carolina
December 18	Roanoke	L 67–107	3–4	The Citadel Armory; Charleston, South Carolina
December 22	Long Island	L 61–69	3–5	The Citadel Armory; Charleston, South Carolina
December 29*	Northwestern; Poinsettia Classic	L 74–91	3–6	Greenville Memorial Auditorium; Greenville, South Carolina
December 30	at Furman; Poinsettia Classic	L 71–80	3–7 (0–1)	Greenville Memorial Auditorium; Greenville, South Carolina
January 3	No. 11 Davidson	L 41–56	3–8 (0–2)	The Citadel Armory; Charleston, South Carolina
January 6	at Richmond	W 53–51	4–8 (1–2)	Richmond Arena; Richmond, Virginia
January 10	at Furman	L 56–60 ^{OT}	4–9 (1–3)	Greenville Memorial Auditorium; Greenville, South Carolina
January 17	VMI	W 84–70	5–9 (2–3)	The Citadel Armory; Charleston, South Carolina
January 24	George Washington	L 77–95	5–10 (2–4)	The Citadel Armory; Charleston, South Carolina
January 27*	Maine	W 81–63	6–10	The Citadel Armory; Charleston, South Carolina
January 31	William & Mary	L 60–65	6–11 (2–5)	The Citadel Armory; Charleston, South Carolina
February 3	Richmond	L 81–82 ^{OT}	6–12 (2–6)	The Citadel Armory; Charleston, South Carolina
February 7	Furman	W 68–67	7–12 (3–6)	The Citadel Armory; Charleston, South Carolina
February 12	at William & Mary	L 74–79	7–13 (3–7)	Blow Gymnasium; Williamsburg, Virginia
February 14	at East Carolina	L 69–83	7–14 (3–8)	Minges Coliseum; Greenville, North Carolina
February 17	at VMI	W 68–61	8–14 (4–8)	Cormack Field House; Lexington, Virginia
February 21	East Carolina	L 71–84	8–15 (4–9)	The Citadel Armory; Charleston, South Carolina
1970 Southern Conference men's basketball tournament
February 28	vs. George Washington	L 64–66	8–16	Charlotte Coliseum; Charlotte, North Carolina
*Non-conference game. (#) Tournament seedings in parentheses. All times are in Eastern Time.

== 1970–71 ==
1970–71 The Citadel Bulldogs men's basketball
- Conference: Southern Conference
- Record: 13–12 (6–5 SoCon)
- Head coach: Dick Campbell
- Home arena: The Citadel Armory

1970–71 Southern Conference men's basketball standings
	Conf.				Overall
Team	W		L	PCT	W		L	PCT
Davidson	9	–	1	.900	15	–	11	.577
William & Mary	7	–	3	.700	11	–	16	.407
East Carolina	7	–	4	.636	13	–	12	.520
The Citadel	6	–	5	.545	13	–	12	.520
Furman †	5	–	5	.500	15	–	12	.556
Richmond	3	–	9	.250	7	–	21	.250
VMI	1	–	11	.083	1	–	25	.038
† Southern Conference Tournament winner Rankings from AP Poll

Date time, TV	Opponent	Result	Record	Site city, state
December 1*	Tennessee Wesleyan	W 100–72	1–0	The Citadel Armory; Charleston, South Carolina
December 3*	Wofford	W 82–62	2–0	The Citadel Armory; Charleston, South Carolina
December 5*	at Tulane	L 69–75	2–1	Devlin Fieldhouse; New Orleans
December 9*	Mercer	L 70–73	2–2	The Citadel Armory; Charleston, South Carolina
December 12	at William & Mary	W 71–67	3–2 (1–0)	Blow Gymnasium; Williamsburg, Virginia
December 17*	at George Washington	W 73–68	4–2	Washington, D.C.
December 19*	at Xavier	W 73–68	5–2	Schmidt Field House; Cincinnati
December 29*	Navy; Palmetto Classic	L 69–72	5–3	The Citadel Armory; Charleston, South Carolina
December 30*	Ole Miss; Palmetto Classic	W 109–90	6–3	The Citadel Armory; Charleston, South Carolina
January 4	William & Mary	L 54–59	6–4 (1–1)	The Citadel Armory; Charleston, South Carolina
January 7*	Texas A&M	W 62–61	7–4	The Citadel Armory; Charleston, South Carolina
January 9	Furman	W 90–80	8–4 (2–1)	The Citadel Armory; Charleston, South Carolina
January 12	at Richmond	L 64–67	8–5 (2–2)	Richmond Arena; Richmond, Virginia
January 16	at VMI	W 66–64 ^{OT}	9–5 (3–2)	Cormack Field House; Lexington, Virginia
January 23*	at Tampa	L 76–77	9–6	Tampa, Florida
January 30*	at Arkansas State	L 60–74	9–7	Jonesboro, Arkansas
February 4	VMI	W 91–65	10–7 (4–2)	The Citadel Armory; Charleston, South Carolina
February 6	at Furman	L 86–91	10–8 (4–3)	Greenville Memorial Auditorium; Greenville, South Carolina
February 8*	at Chattanooga	L 70–81	10–9	Maclellan Gymnasium; Chattanooga, Tennessee
February 13	East Carolina	W 81–57	11–9 (5–3)	The Citadel Armory; Charleston, South Carolina
February 16	Richmond	W 78–63	12–9 (6–3)	The Citadel Armory; Charleston, South Carolina
February 20*	West Virginia Tech	W 47–45 ^{OT}	13–9	The Citadel Armory; Charleston, South Carolina
February 22	at Davidson	L 50–85	13–10 (6–4)	Johnston Gym; Davidson, North Carolina
February 27	at East Carolina	L 67–81	13–11 (6–5)	Minges Coliseum; Greenville, North Carolina
1971 Southern Conference men's basketball tournament
March 4	at Furman	L 82–95	13–12	Greenville Memorial Auditorium; Greenville, South Carolina
*Non-conference game. (#) Tournament seedings in parentheses. All times are in Eastern Time.

== 1971–72 ==
1971–72 The Citadel Bulldogs men's basketball
- Conference: Southern Conference
- Record: 12–13 (5–6 SoCon)
- Head coach: George Hill
- Home arena: The Citadel Armory

1971–72 Southern Conference men's basketball standings
	Conf.				Overall
Team	W		L	PCT	W		L	PCT
Davidson	8	–	2	.800	19	–	9	.679
Furman	8	–	3	.727	17	–	11	.607
William & Mary	6	–	4	.600	10	–	17	.370
East Carolina †	7	–	5	.583	14	–	15	.483
The Citadel	5	–	6	.455	12	–	13	.480
Richmond	3	–	9	.250	6	–	19	.240
VMI	2	–	10	.167	6	–	19	.240
† Southern Conference Tournament winner Rankings from AP Poll

Date time, TV	Opponent	Result	Record	Site city, state
December 1*	Campbell	L 77–79 ^{OT}	0–1	The Citadel Armory; Charleston, South Carolina
December 3*	at No. 1 UCLA	L 49–105	0–2	Pauley Pavilion; Los Angeles
December 6*	at Rice	L 69–73	0–3	Tudor Fieldhouse; Houston
December 8*	Wofford	W 86–66	1–3	The Citadel Armory; Charleston, South Carolina
December 11	at William & Mary	L 67–74	1–4 (0–1)	The Citadel Armory; Charleston, South Carolina
December 18	East Carolina	W 89–86	2–4 (1–1)	The Citadel Armory; Charleston, South Carolina
December 29*	Air Force; Palmetto Classic	W 61–60	3–4	The Citadel Armory; Charleston, South Carolina
December 30*	No. 11 Virginia; Palmetto Classic	L 72–77	3–5	The Citadel Armory; Charleston, South Carolina
January 3	William & Mary	W 68–59	4–5 (2–1)	The Citadel Armory; Charleston, South Carolina
January 5	at Furman	L 86–101	4–6 (2–2)	Greenville Memorial Auditorium; Greenville, South Carolina
January 10*	Tulane	L 61–67	4–7	The Citadel Armory; Charleston, South Carolina
January 15	at VMI	W 68–62 ^{OT}	5–7 (3–2)	Cormack Field House; Lexington, Virginia
January 19*	Arkansas State	W 86–48	6–7	The Citadel Armory; Charleston, South Carolina
January 22*	Chattanooga	W 117–100	7–7	The Citadel Armory; Charleston, South Carolina
January 26*	at Stetson	W 85–70	8–7	DeLand, Florida
February 1	at Richmond	L 68–75	8–8 (3–3)	Richmond Coliseum; Richmond, Virginia
February 5	Davidson	L 70–77	8–9 (3–4)	The Citadel Armory; Charleston, South Carolina
February 7*	Stetson	W 93–68	9–9	The Citadel Armory; Charleston, South Carolina
February 12	at East Carolina	L 83–91	9–10 (3–5)	Minges Coliseum; Greenville, North Carolina
February 14	VMI	W 87–60	10–10 (4–5)	The Citadel Armory; Charleston, South Carolina
February 16	Richmond	W 99–79	11–10 (5–5)	The Citadel Armory; Charleston, South Carolina
February 19	Furman	L 75–80	11–11 (5–6)	The Citadel Armory; Charleston, South Carolina
February 22*	Florida Presbyterian	W 112–90	12–11	The Citadel Armory; Charleston, South Carolina
February 26*	Fairleigh Dickinson	L 46–67	12–12	The Citadel Armory; Charleston, South Carolina
1972 Southern Conference men's basketball tournament
March 2	at East Carolina	L 71–80	12–13	Minges Coliseum; Greenville, North Carolina
*Non-conference game. (#) Tournament seedings in parentheses. All times are in Eastern Time.

== 1972–73 ==
1972–73 The Citadel Bulldogs men's basketball
- Conference: Southern Conference
- Record: 11–15 (6–7 SoCon)
- Head coach: George Hill
- Home arena: The Citadel Armory

1972–73 Southern Conference men's basketball standings
	Conf.				Overall
Team	W		L	PCT	W		L	PCT
Davidson	9	–	1	.900	18	–	9	.667
Furman †	11	–	2	.846	20	–	9	.690
East Carolina	7	–	7	.500	13	–	13	.500
The Citadel	6	–	7	.462	11	–	15	.423
William & Mary	5	–	6	.455	10	–	17	.370
Richmond	5	–	9	.357	8	–	16	.333
Appalachian State	3	–	8	.273	6	–	20	.231
VMI	3	–	9	.250	6	–	20	.231
† Southern Conference Tournament winner Rankings from AP Poll

Date time, TV	Opponent	Result	Record	Site city, state
December 1*	Rollins	W 63–54	1–0	The Citadel Armory; Charleston, South Carolina
December 6*	at Penn	L 34–67	1–1	Palestra; Philadelphia
December 9	William & Mary	W 82–74	2–1 (1–0)	The Citadel Armory; Charleston, South Carolina
December 16	East Carolina	W 55–54	3–1 (2–0)	The Citadel Armory; Charleston, South Carolina
December 28*	Brown; Palmetto Classic	L 60–67	3–2	The Citadel Armory; Charleston, South Carolina
December 29*	Tulane; Palmetto Classic	L 60–61	3–3	The Citadel Armory; Charleston, South Carolina
January 3*	at Arkansas State	W 81–80	4–3	Jonesboro, Arkansas
January 5*	at George Washington; Presidential Classic	L 80–88	4–4	Washington, D.C.
January 6*	vs. Rice; Presidential Classic	L 64–82	4–5	Washington, D.C.
January 13	at Chattanooga	L 72–95 ^{OT}	4–6	Maclellan Gymnasium; Chattanooga, Tennessee
January 15*	South Florida	W 66–56 ^{OT}	5–6	The Citadel Armory; Charleston, South Carolina
January 18	at Appalachian State	L 75–78	5–7 (2–1)	Varsity Gymnasium; Boone, North Carolina
January 20	Furman	L 46–62	5–8 (2–2)	The Citadel Armory; Charleston, South Carolina
January 22*	Georgia State	W 73–59	6–8	The Citadel Armory; Charleston, South Carolina
January 24*	at Clemson	L 54–72	6–9	Littlejohn Coliseum; Clemson, South Carolina
January 27	at Richmond	L 63–65	6–10 (2–3)	Robins Center; Richmond, Virginia
January 29	at VMI	W 69–67	7–10 (3–3)	Cormack Field House; Lexington, Virginia
February 3	Richmond	W 77–72	8–10 (4–3)	The Citadel Armory; Charleston, South Carolina
February 6	at William & Mary	L 74–83	8–11 (4–4)	William & Mary Hall; Williamsburg, Virginia
February 10	at Davidson	L 75–85	8–12 (4–5)	Johnston Gym; Davidson, North Carolina
February 12	VMI	W 75–62	9–12 (5–5)	The Citadel Armory; Charleston, South Carolina
February 17	at Furman	L 69–79	9–13 (5–6)	Greenville Memorial Auditorium; Greenville, South Carolina
February 19	Appalachian State	W 87–69	10–13 (6–6)	The Citadel Armory; Charleston, South Carolina
February 22*	Wofford	W 66–56	11–13	The Citadel Armory; Charleston, South Carolina
February 24	at East Carolina	L 72–80	11–14 (6–7)	Minges Coliseum; Greenville, North Carolina
1973 Southern Conference men's basketball tournament
March 1	William & Mary	L 72–97	11–15	William & Mary Hall; Williamsburg, Virginia
*Non-conference game. (#) Tournament seedings in parentheses. All times are in Eastern Time.

== 1973–74 ==
1973–74 The Citadel Bulldogs men's basketball
- Conference: Southern Conference
- Record: 10–14 (4–9 SoCon)
- Head coach: George Hill
- Home arena: McAlister Field House

1973–74 Southern Conference men's basketball standings
	Conf.				Overall
Team	W		L	PCT	W		L	PCT
Furman †	11	–	1	.917	22	–	9	.710
Richmond	10	–	4	.714	16	–	12	.571
Davidson	7	–	3	.700	18	–	9	.667
East Carolina	8	–	6	.571	13	–	12	.520
William & Mary	5	–	6	.455	9	–	18	.333
The Citadel	4	–	9	.308	10	–	14	.417
VMI	3	–	9	.250	6	–	18	.250
Appalachian State	1	–	11	.083	5	–	20	.200
† Southern Conference Tournament winner Rankings from AP Poll

Date time, TV	Opponent	Result	Record	Site city, state
December 1*	at No. 3 Indiana	L 55–74	0–1	Assembly Hall; Bloomington, Indiana
December 3*	Oglethorpe	W 89–60	1–1	The Citadel Armory; Charleston, South Carolina
December 8	William & Mary	W 88–65	2–1 (1–0)	The Citadel Armory; Charleston, South Carolina
December 15	East Carolina	W 69–63	3–1 (2–0)	The Citadel Armory; Charleston, South Carolina
December 20*	at Georgia State	W 58–55	4–1	GSU Sports Arena; Atlanta
December 28*	Lehigh; Brigadier-Palmetto Classic	W 83–65	5–1	The Citadel Armory; Charleston, South Carolina
December 29*	Navy; Brigadier-Palmetto Classic	W 74–66	6–1	The Citadel Armory; Charleston, South Carolina
January 5*	Rochester	W 80–65	7–1	The Citadel Armory; Charleston, South Carolina
January 8*	at South Florida	L 78–90	7–2	Tampa, Florida
January 12	at Appalachian State	L 72–90	7–3 (2–1)	Varsity Gymnasium; Boone, North Carolina
January 14	at VMI	L 63–70	7–4 (2–2)	Cormack Field House; Lexington, Virginia
January 19	Furman	L 42–50	7–5 (2–3)	The Citadel Armory; Charleston, South Carolina
January 21	Appalachian State	W 77–76	8–5 (3–3)	The Citadel Armory; Charleston, South Carolina
January 26*	Atlantic Christian	W 85–62	9–5	The Citadel Armory; Charleston, South Carolina
January 30*	at Clemson	L 58–62 ^{OT}	9–6	The Citadel Armory; Charleston, South Carolina
February 2	at Richmond	L 82–89 ^{OT}	9–7 (3–4)	Robins Center; Richmond, Virginia
February 4	at William & Mary	L 57–64	9–8 (3–5)	William & Mary Hall; Williamsburg, Virginia
February 9	Davidson	L 69–73	9–9 (3–6)	The Citadel Armory; Charleston, South Carolina
February 12	at Furman	L 59–91	9–10 (3–7)	Greenville Memorial Auditorium; Greenville, South Carolina
February 16	Richmond	L 65–73	9–11 (3–8)	The Citadel Armory; Charleston, South Carolina
February 18	VMI	W 65–47	10–11 (4–8)	The Citadel Armory; Charleston, South Carolina
February 23	at East Carolina	L 66–78	10–12 (4–9)	Minges Coliseum; Greenville, North Carolina
February 25	James Madison	L 41–43	10–13	The Citadel Armory; Charleston, South Carolina
1974 Southern Conference men's basketball tournament
February 28	vs. Davidson	L 69–82	10–14	Richmond Coliseum; Richmond, Virginia
*Non-conference game. (#) Tournament seedings in parentheses. All times are in Eastern Time.
