= George Balanis =

American basketball coach

Personal information
- Born: March 7, 1942 (age 84)

Career information
- High school: Newport News (Newport News, Virginia)
- College: University of Texas at El Paso (UTEP)

Career history

Coaching
- 19??–1974: Walsingham Academy
- 1974–1977: William & Mary

George A. Balanis (born March 7, 1942) is an American former head basketball coach for the William & Mary Tribe men's team from 1974 to 1977. In three years as coach he compiled a 21–12 record in Southern Conference play (47-39 overall).
