= The Citadel Bulldogs basketball, 1975–1979 =

The Citadel Bulldogs basketball teams represented The Citadel, The Military College of South Carolina in Charleston, South Carolina, United States. The program was established in 1900–01, and has continuously fielded a team since 1912–13. Their primary rivals are College of Charleston, Furman and VMI.

== 1974–75 ==
1974–75 The Citadel Bulldogs men's basketball
- Conference: Southern Conference
- Record: 5–15 (2–11 SoCon)
- Head coach: Les Robinson
- Home arena: McAlister Field House

1974–75 Southern Conference men's basketball standings
	Conf.				Overall
Team	W		L	PCT	W		L	PCT
Furman†	12	–	0	1.000	22	–	7	.759
East Carolina	11	–	3	.786	19	–	9	.679
William & Mary	6	–	5	.545	16	–	12	.571
Richmond	7	–	7	.500	10	–	16	.385
VMI	6	–	6	.500	13	–	13	.500
Davidson	4	–	6	.400	7	–	19	.269
The Citadel	2	–	11	.154	5	–	15	.250
Appalachian State	1	–	11	.083	3	–	23	.115
† Southern Conference Tournament winner Rankings from AP Poll

Date time, TV	Opponent	Result	Record	Site city, state
November 30*	Baptist	W 107–92	1–0	McAlister Field House; Charleston, South Carolina
December 3*	UNC Wilmington	W 115–88	2–0	McAlister Field House; Charleston, South Carolina
December 7	William & Mary	L 73–82	2–1 (0–1)	McAlister Field House; Charleston, South Carolina
December 14	Appalachian State	W 99–94	3–1 (1–1)	McAlister Field House; Charleston, South Carolina
December 19*	Rochester Tech	W 90–80	4–1	McAlister Field House; Charleston, South Carolina
January 4	at East Carolina	L 81–111	4–2 (1–2)	Minges Coliseum; Greenville, North Carolina
January 8*	at Tulane	L 71–78	4–3	Devlin Fieldhouse; New Orleans
January 11	at Appalachian State	W 70–69	5–3 (2–2)	Varsity Gymnasium; Boone, North Carolina
January 13	at VMI	L 101–108	5–4 (2–3)	Cormack Field House; Lexington, Virginia
January 18	Furman	L 65–66	5–5 (2–4)	McAlister Field House; Charleston, South Carolina
January 25	at Davidson	L 76–90	5–6 (2–5)	Johnston Gym; Davidson, North Carolina
January 29*	at Clemson	L 75–106	5–7	Littlejohn Coliseum; Clemson, South Carolina
February 1	at Richmond	L 75–80	5–8 (2–6)	Robins Center; Richmond, Virginia
February 3	at William & Mary	L 53–81	5–9 (2–7)	William & Mary Hall; Williambsurg, Virginia
February 8	VMI	L 68–82	5–10 (2–8)	McAlister Field House; Charleston, South Carolina
February 15	Richmond	L 90–99	5–11 (2–9)	McAlister Field House; Charleston, South Carolina
February 18	at Furman	L 69–94	5–12 (2–10)	Greenville Memorial Auditorium; Greenville, South Carolina
February 22	East Carolina	L 84–87	5–13 (2–11)	McAlister Field House; Charleston, South Carolina
February 24*	Campbell	L 78–86	5–14	McAlister Field House; Charleston, South Carolina
1975 Southern Conference men's basketball tournament
March 1	at East Carolina	L 66–78	5–15	Minges Coliseum; Greenville, North Carolina
*Non-conference game. (#) Tournament seedings in parentheses. All times are in Eastern Time.

== 1975–76 ==
1975–76 The Citadel Bulldogs men's basketball
- Conference: Southern Conference
- Record: 10–17 (6–8 SoCon)
- Head coach: Les Robinson
- Home arena: McAlister Field House

1975–76 Southern Conference men's basketball standings
	Conf.				Overall
Team	W		L	PCT	W		L	PCT
VMI†	9	–	3	.750	22	–	10	.688
William & Mary	8	–	3	.727	15	–	13	.536
Richmond	7	–	7	.500	14	–	14	.500
East Carolina	7	–	7	.500	11	–	15	.423
Appalachian State	6	–	6	.500	13	–	14	.481
The Citadel	6	–	7	.462	10	–	17	.370
Furman	5	–	7	.417	9	–	18	.333
Davidson	1	–	9	.100	5	–	21	.192
† Southern Conference Tournament winner Rankings from AP Poll

Date time, TV	Opponent	Result	Record	Site city, state
November 29*	at No. 13 NC State	L 75–103	0–1	Reynolds Coliseum; Raleigh, North Carolina
December 1*	UNC Wilmington	W 81–63	1–1	McAlister Field House; Charleston, South Carolina
December 6	at William & Mary	L 61–70	1–2 (0–1)	William & Mary Hall; Williamsburg, Virginia
December 10*	at Baptist	W 75–70	2–2	CSU Field House; North Charleston, South Carolina
December 13	at Appalachian State	L 65–83	2–3 (0–2)	Varsity Gymnasium; Boone, North Carolina
December 20	East Carolina	L 67–68	2–4 (0–3)	McAlister Field House; Charleston, South Carolina
December 29*	vs. Rutgers; Poinsettia Classic	L 73–96	2–5	Greenville Memorial Auditorium; Greenville, South Carolina
December 30	at Furman; Poinsettia Classic	L 90–92 ^{OT}	2–6 (0–4)	Greenville Memorial Auditorium; Greenville, South Carolina
January 2	at East Carolina	L 76–81	2–7 (0–5)	Minges Coliseum; Greenville, North Carolina
January 5*	at Stetson; Hatter Classic	L 60–66	2–8	Edmunds Center; DeLand, Florida
January 6*	vs. Boston University; Hatter Classic	W 86–73	3–8	Edmunds Center; DeLand, Florida
January 10*	Clemson	L 68–81	3–9	McAlister Field House; Charleston, South Carolina
January 12	VMI	W 78–74	4–9 (1–5)	McAlister Field House; Charleston, South Carolina
January 14*	at South Carolina	L 74–90	4–10	Carolina Coliseum; Columbia, South Carolina
January 17	at Furman	L 67–68	4–11 (1–6)	Greenville Memorial Auditorium; Greenville, South Carolina
January 21	Davidson	W 81–77	5–11 (2–6)	McAlister Field House; Charleston, South Carolina
January 24	at Richmond	W 75–74	6–11 (3–6)	Robins Center; Richmond, Virginia
January 26*	Tulane	L 85–101	6–12	McAlister Field House; Charleston, South Carolina
January 31	Appalachian State	L 67–70	6–13 (3–7)	McAlister Field House; Charleston, South Carolina
February 2*	at Campbell	L 106–112 ^{OT}	6–14	Carter Gymnasium; Buies Creek, North Carolina
February 7	Richmond	W 91–79	7–14 (4–7)	McAlister Field House; Charleston, South Carolina
February 10	Furman	W 76–72	8–14 (5–7)	McAlister Field House; Charleston, South Carolina
February 14	at VMI	L 59–76	8–15 (5–8)	Cormack Field House; Lexington, Virginia
February 16	William & Mary	W 64–62	9–15 (6–8)	McAlister Field House; Charleston, South Carolina
February 21*	at Georgia Tech	L 56–58	9–16	Alexander Memorial Coliseum; Atlanta
February 23*	Baptist	W 96–69	10–16	McAlister Field House; Charleston, South Carolina
1976 Southern Conference men's basketball tournament
February 28	at Richmond	L 69–82	10–17	Robins Center; Richmond, Virginia
*Non-conference game. (#) Tournament seedings in parentheses. All times are in Eastern Time.

== 1976–77 ==
1976–77 The Citadel Bulldogs men's basketball
- Conference: Southern Conference
- Record: 8–19 (0–10 SoCon)
- Head coach: Les Robinson
- Home arena: McAlister Field House

1976–77 Southern Conference men's basketball standings
	Conf.				Overall
Team	W		L	PCT	W		L	PCT
No. 20 VMI †	8	–	2	.800	26	–	4	.867
Furman	8	–	2	.800	18	–	10	.643
Appalachian State	8	–	4	.667	17	–	12	.586
William & Mary	7	–	4	.636	16	–	14	.533
East Carolina	3	–	9	.250	10	–	18	.357
Davidson	2	–	8	.200	5	–	22	.185
The Citadel	2	–	9	.182	8	–	19	.296
† Southern Conference Tournament winner Rankings from AP Poll

Date time, TV	Opponent	Result	Record	Site city, state
November 29*	Wofford	W 83–77	1–0	McAlister Field House; Charleston, South Carolina
December 1*	at Penn	L 69–108	1–1	Palestra; Philadelphia
December 4	at William & Mary	L 61–94	1–2 (0–1)	William & Mary Hall; Williamsburg, Virginia
December 6*	Presbyterian; Citadel Invitational Tournament	W 87–78	2–2	McAlister Field House; Charleston, South Carolina
December 7*	College of Charleston; Citadel Invitational Tournament	L 72–81	2–3	McAlister Field House; Charleston, South Carolina
December 11*	USC Aiken	W 86–78	3–3	McAlister Field House; Charleston, South Carolina
December 18*	at East Carolina	W 70–62	4–3	Minges Coliseum; Greenville, North Carolina
December 28*	vs. Columbia; Poinsettia Classic	L 87–89 ^{OT}	4–4	Greenville Memorial Auditorium; Greenville, South Carolina
December 29*	vs. Navy; Poinsettia Classic	L 56–89	4–5	Greenville Memorial Auditorium; Greenville, South Carolina
January 3*	at Stetson	W 67–65	5–5	Edmunds Center; DeLand, Florida
January 10*	at Baptist	L 54–68	5–6	CSU Field House; North Charleston, South Carolina
January 15	at Furman	L 74–88	5–7 (0–2)	Greenville Memorial Auditorium; Greenville, South Carolina
January 17	VMI	L 62–68	5–8 (0–3)	McAlister Field House; Charleston, South Carolina
January 22*	Georgia Tech	L 59–63	5–9	McAlister Field House; Charleston, South Carolina
January 24	William & Mary	L 53–61	5–10 (0–4)	McAlister Field House; Charleston, South Carolina
January 27	at Appalachian State	L 56–76	5–11 (0–5)	Varsity Gymnasium; Boone, North Carolina
January 29	at VMI	L 70–88	5–12 (0–6)	Cormack Field House; Lexington, Virginia
January 31	Marshall	L 73–82	5–13 (0–7)	McAlister Field House; Charleston, South Carolina
February 2	at Davidson	L 60–62	5–14 (0–8)	Johnston Gym; Davidson, North Carolina
February 5	Appalachian State	L 64–68	5–15 (0–9)	McAlister Field House; Charleston, South Carolina
February 9*	at South Carolina	L 66–85	5–16	Carolina Coliseum; Columbia, South Carolina
February 12	Furman	L 88–91	5–17 (0–10)	McAlister Field House; Charleston, South Carolina
February 15*	at Georgia Tech	L 64–90	5–18	Alexander Memorial Coliseum; Atlanta, Georgia
February 17*	Baptist	W 78–74	6–18	McAlister Field House; Charleston, South Carolina
February 19*	at East Carolina	W 75–72	7–18	Minges Coliseum; Greenville, North Carolina
February 21*	James Madison	W 79–72	8–18	McAlister Field House; Charleston, South Carolina
1977 Southern Conference men's basketball tournament
February 26	at Furman	L 69–76	8–19	Greenville Memorial Auditorium; Greenville, South Carolina
*Non-conference game. (#) Tournament seedings in parentheses. All times are in Eastern Time.

== 1977–78 ==
1977–78 The Citadel Bulldogs men's basketball
- Conference: Southern Conference
- Record: 8–19 (2–11 SoCon)
- Head coach: Les Robinson
- Home arena: McAlister Field House

1977–78 Southern Conference men's basketball standings
	Conf.				Overall
Team	W		L	PCT	W		L	PCT
Appalachian State	9	–	3	.750	15	–	13	.536
VMI	7	–	3	.700	21	–	7	.750
Marshall	8	–	5	.615	14	–	15	.483
Furman †	7	–	5	.583	19	–	11	.633
Chattanooga	7	–	5	.583	16	–	11	.593
Western Carolina	4	–	8	.333	7	–	19	.269
Davidson	3	–	7	.300	9	–	18	.333
The Citadel	2	–	11	.154	8	–	19	.296
† 1978 Southern Conference tournament winner Rankings from AP Poll

Date time, TV	Opponent	Result	Record	Site city, state
November 25*	USC Aiken	W 82–58	1–0	McAlister Field House; Charleston, South Carolina
November 28*	College of Charleston; Citadel Invitational	W 84–82 ^{OT}	2–0	McAlister Field House; Charleston, South Carolina
November 29*	Lander; Citadel Invitational	W 74–69	3–0	McAlister Field House; Charleston, South Carolina
December 3*	at Clemson	L 65–99	3–1	Littlejohn Coliseum; Clemson, South Carolina
December 5*	Wofford	W 88–59	4–1	McAlister Field House; Charleston, South Carolina
December 8*	Vanderbilt	L 50–53 ^{OT}	4–2	McAlister Field House; Charleston, South Carolina
December 10	Western Carolina	L 64–65	4–3 (0–1)	McAlister Field House; Charleston, South Carolina
December 20*	Canisius	W 79–72	5–3	McAlister Field House; Charleston, South Carolina
December 21*	Catholic	L 72–74	5–4	McAlister Field House; Charleston, South Carolina
January 5*	at UNC Wilmington	L 66–81	5–5	Trask Coliseum; Wilmington, North Carolina
January 7	at Chattanooga	L 70–80	5–6 (0–2)	Maclellan Gymnasium; Chattanooga, Tennessee
January 10*	Penn	L 73–103	5–7	McAlister Field House; Charleston, South Carolina
January 12	at Western Carolina	L 72–73	5–8 (0–3)	Cullowhee, North Carolina
January 14	at Marshall	L 81–85 ^{OT}	5–9 (0–4)	Veterans Memorial Fieldhouse; Huntington, West Virginia
January 17	at Furman	L 77–106	5–10 (0–5)	Greenville Memorial Auditorium; Greenville, South Carolina
January 21	at Appalachian State	L 66–75	5–11 (0–6)	Varsity Gymnasium; Boone, North Carolina
January 25	Chattanooga	L 81–84 ^{OT}	5–12 (0–7)	McAlister Field House; Charleston, South Carolina
January 28	VMI	L 61–79	5–13 (0–8)	McAlister Field House; Charleston, South Carolina
February 1	Appalachian State	L 65–66	5–14 (0–9)	McAlister Field House; Charleston, South Carolina
February 4	Marshall	W 74–57	6–14 (1–9)	McAlister Field House; Charleston, South Carolina
February 6	Davidson	L 81–88	6–15 (1–10)	McAlister Field House; Charleston, South Carolina
February 8	Furman	W 85–82	7–15 (2–10)	McAlister Field House; Charleston, South Carolina
February 11	at VMI	L 72–84	7–16 (2–11)	Cormack Field House; Lexington, Virginia
February 13*	at James Madison	L 70–71	7–17	Harrisonburg, Virginia
February 15*	Baptist	L 77–83	7–18	McAlister Field House; Charleston, South Carolina
February 20*	James Madison	W 89–88	8–18	McAlister Field House; Charleston, South Carolina
1978 Southern Conference men's basketball tournament
February 25	at Appalachian State	L 64–81	8–19	Varsity Gymnasium; Boone, North Carolina
*Non-conference game. (#) Tournament seedings in parentheses. All times are in Eastern Time.

== 1978–79 ==
1978–79 The Citadel Bulldogs men's basketball
- Conference: Southern Conference
- Record: 20–7 (10–4 SoCon)
- Head coach: Les Robinson
- Home arena: McAlister Field House

1978–79 Southern Conference men's basketball standings
	Conf.				Overall
Team	W		L	PCT	W		L	PCT
Appalachian State †	11	–	3	.786	23	–	6	.793
Furman	9	–	3	.750	20	–	9	.690
The Citadel	10	–	4	.714	20	–	7	.741
Western Carolina	5	–	7	.417	14	–	14	.500
Marshall	5	–	8	.385	11	–	16	.407
Davidson	3	–	7	.300	8	–	19	.296
Chattanooga	3	–	8	.273	14	–	13	.519
VMI	2	–	8	.200	12	–	15	.444
† 1979 Southern Conference Tournament winner Rankings from AP poll

Date time, TV	Opponent	Result	Record	Site city, state
November 27*	Piedmont	W 103–61	1–0	McAlister Field House; Charleston, South Carolina
December 1*	Fredonia State	W 75–48	2–0	McAlister Field House; Charleston, South Carolina
December 2*	Biscayne	W 98–69	3–0	McAlister Field House; Charleston, South Carolina
December 4*	at Vanderbilt	L 63–78	3–1	Memorial Gymnasium; Nashville, Tennessee
December 7*	USC Upstate	W 99–67	4–1	McAlister Field House; Charleston, South Carolina
December 9*	at Clemson	L 58–71	4–2	Littlejohn Coliseum; Clemson, South Carolina
December 16*	Wofford	W 92–62	5–2	McAlister Field House; Charleston, South Carolina
January 6*	Clemson	W 58–56	6–2	McAlister Field House; Charleston, South Carolina
January 8	VMI	W 91–83	7–2 (1–0)	McAlister Field House; Charleston, South Carolina
January 13	at Marshall	W 58–57	8–2 (2–0)	Veterans Memorial Fieldhouse; Huntington, West Virginia
January 15	Western Carolina	W 78–54	9–2 (3–0)	McAlister Field House; Charleston, South Carolina
January 20	Furman	W 78–76	10–2 (4–0)	McAlister Field House; Charleston, South Carolina
January 22*	Erskine	W 83–61	11–2	McAlister Field House; Charleston, South Carolina
January 24	at Davidson	L 72–87	11–3 (4–1)	Johnston Gym; Davidson, North Carolina
January 27	at Chattanooga	W 79–71	12–3 (5–1)	Maclellan Gymnasium; Chattanooga, Tennessee
January 29	at South Carolina State	W 91–86	13–3	McAlister Field House; Charleston, South Carolina
February 3	at Appalachian State	L 65–76	13–4 (5–2)	Varsity Gymnasium; Boone, North Carolina
February 5	Davidson	W 79–70	14–4 (6–2)	McAlister Field House; Charleston, South Carolina
February 7	Chattanooga	W 62–61	15–4 (7–2)	McAlister Field House; Charleston, South Carolina
February 10	at Furman	L 84–88 ^{OT}	15–5 (7–3)	Greenville Memorial Auditorium; Greenville, South Carolina
February 12	at VMI	W 72–69	16–5 (8–3)	Cormack Field House; Lexington, Virginia
February 14	Appalachian State	L 64–68	16–6 (8–4)	McAlister Field House; Charleston, South Carolina
February 17	at Western Carolina	W 70–69	17–6 (9–4)	Cullowhee, North Carolina
February 19	Marshall	W 75–69	18–6 (10–4)	McAlister Field House; Charleston, South Carolina
February 21	Baptist	W 91–42	19–6	McAlister Field House; Charleston, South Carolina
1979 Southern Conference men's basketball tournament
February 24	Davidson	W 86–79	20–6	McAlister Field House; Charleston, South Carolina
March 3	vs. Furman	L 94–105	20–7	Roanoke Civic Center; Roanoke, Virginia
*Non-conference game. (#) Tournament seedings in parentheses. All times are in Eastern Time.
