= The Citadel Bulldogs basketball =

2025–26 The Citadel Bulldogs basketball team
- College: The Citadel
- First season: 1900
- Athletic director: Art Chase
- Head coach: Ed Conroy (8th season)
- Conference: SoCon
- Location: Charleston, South Carolina
- Arena: McAlister Field House (capacity: 6,000)
- Nickname: Bulldogs
- Student section: McAlister Maniacs/Long Grey Line
- Colors: Infantry blue and white

Uniforms
Home	Away

Conference tournament champions
- SIAA: 1927

The Citadel Bulldogs basketball team represents The Citadel in Charleston, South Carolina in the sport of men's college basketball. The program is classified in the NCAA's Division I, and the team competes in the Southern Conference South Division. Ed Conroy is in his second stint as the head coach, having previously held the position from 2006–2010.

The team has never won a regular season or Southern Conference men's basketball tournament championship or participated in the NCAA Tournament. Following Northwestern's 2017 NCAA Tournament bid, they are one of three schools playing Division I basketball at the time of the first NCAA basketball tournament to have never made an NCAA Tournament, along with Army and William & Mary. (St. Francis Brooklyn was also part of this group before it discontinued all athletics in 2023.) The team has made one postseason appearance, playing in the 2009 CollegeInsider.com Postseason Tournament, falling in the first round to eventual champion Old Dominion. In 1927 the Bulldogs claimed the Southern Intercollegiate Athletic Association Tournament title, defeating Mercer for their only conference championship. In their history of SoCon play, they have reached past the quarterfinals just once, doing so when they went to the conference tournament final in 1959 and lost to West Virginia.

Notably, the Citadel is one of only two Division I schools that do not sponsor women's basketball. The other is fellow Southern Conference member and senior military college: VMI.

== Facilities ==
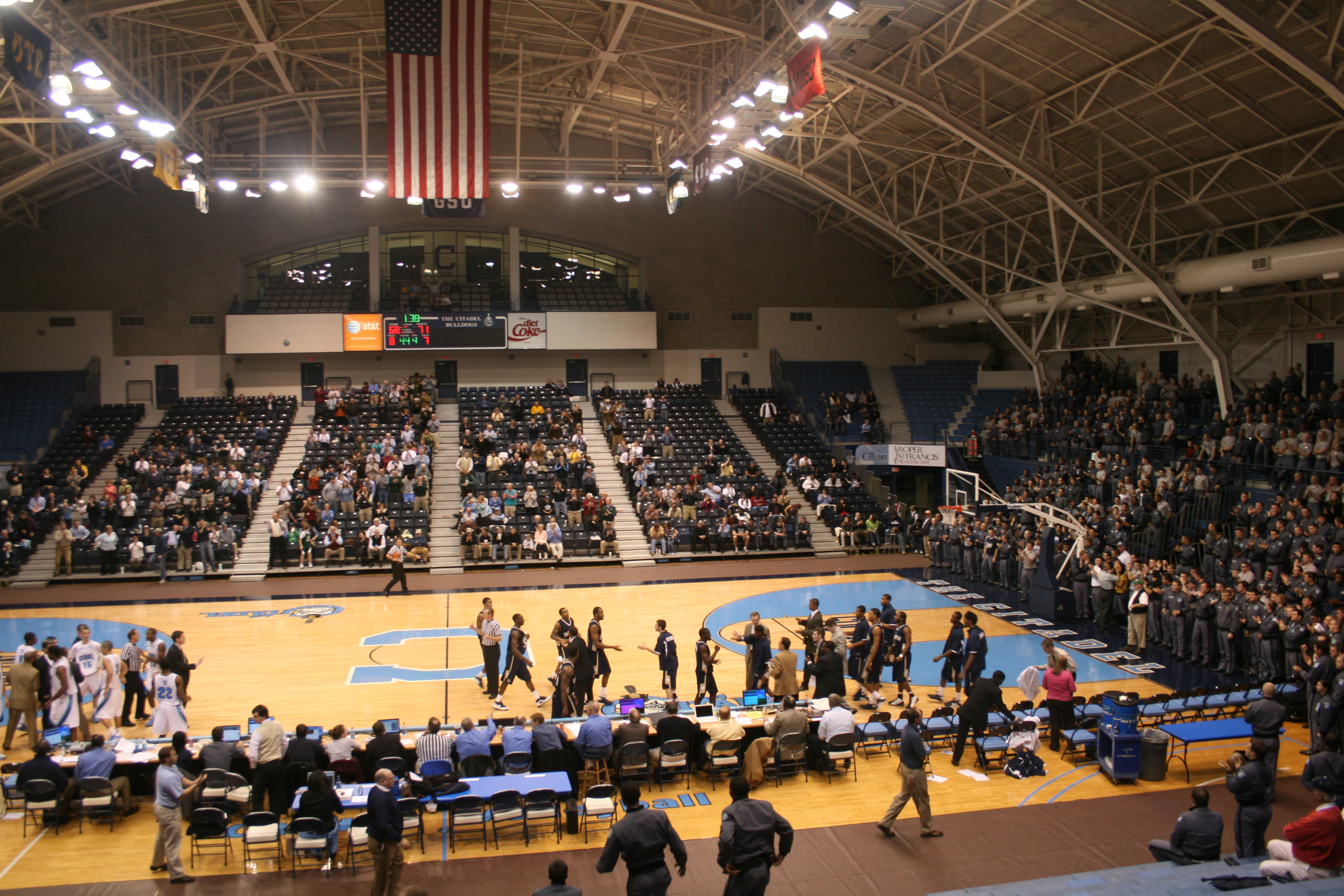
McAlister Field House

The Bulldogs play their home games at the on-campus McAlister Field House, a 6,000 seat arena formerly known as The Armory. The arena was heavily renovated in 1989. During the summer of 2011, The Citadel completed additional renovations to the Field House, building a new floor and revamping the Bulldogs locker room. Since the 1989 renovations, the Bulldogs have played before full capacity on three occasions: Duke (1991), South Carolina (1997), and College of Charleston (1999). Like all Citadel athletic teams, the Bulldogs utilize strength and conditioning, medical, and video spaces in Seignious Hall.

== Notable Bulldogs ==
- Regan Truesdale - Two-time Southern Conference Men's Basketball Player of the Year
- Art Musselman - played in the shadow of Jerry West for three years
- Pat Conroy - author famous, in part, for chronicling his life as a Citadel basketball player in the novels My Losing Season and The Lords of Discipline.

== Honored jerseys ==
The Citadel created the honored jersey in 2009, beginning with Les Robinson. Banners hang in McAlister Field House for each honored jersey. Since Robinson, four additional jerseys have been added. Pat Conroy's jersey was honored most recently, on February 3, 2018.

The Citadel Bulldogs retired numbers
No.	Player	Career	Year Honored
3	Jake Burrows	1938–1940	2012
22	Pat Conroy	1963–1967	2018
33	Art Musselman	1957–1960	2010
33	Regan Truesdale	1982–1985	2011
C	Les Robinson	1974–1985	2009

== Coaches ==
Below is a list of all coaches at The Citadel and their records through the 2020–21 season.

Coach	Career	Record	Conference Record
Not Available	1900–01	0–1	No Conference
J. G. Briggs	1912–13	2–3	No Conference
Darl Buse	1913–14	6–1	No Conference
Hans Kangeter	1914–16	9–4	No Conference
Harvey O'Brien	1916–18	6–2	No Conference
C. F. Myers	1918–25	52–27	7–9
Locke Brown	1925–26	10–6	4–1
Benny Blatt	1926–30	52–22	8–4
Johnny Douglas	1930–33	18–31	1–3
Charlie Willard	1933–35	13–16	0–0
Rock Norman	1935–40	45–32	16–14
Ben Parker	1939–41	6–16	4–13
Ben Clemons	1941–42, 1943–44	4–5	2–8
Bo Sherman	1942–43	8–6	5–3
Ernest Wehman	1944–45	9–5	8–4
Eugene Clark	1945–46	8–10	2–6
Whitey Piro	1946–47	4–11	0–10
Bernard O'Neil	1947–52	28–71	9–47
Leo Zack	1952–54	5–33	1–18
Jim Browning	1954–55	1–18	0–10
Hank Witt	1955–56	2–19	0–10
Norm Sloan	1956–60	57–38	33–19
Mel Thompson	1960–67	67–97	35–46
Dick Campbell	1967–71	45–54	21–27
George Hill	1971–74	33–42	11–18
Les Robinson	1974–85	132–162	61–99
Randy Nesbit	1985–92	76–121	32–72
Pat Dennis	1992–2006	158–233	72–146
Ed Conroy	2006–10, 2022–present	49–76	29–47
Chuck Driesell	2010–2015	42–113	22–66
Duggar Baucom	2015–2022	77–136	27–97

== Rivalries ==
The primary Bulldog rivals, as in other sports, are VMI, Furman, and College of Charleston. The Citadel also has historical rivalries with other schools within the state. The Bulldogs' records versus each rival are listed below, through the 2020–21 season.

=== Records vs rivals ===
Opponent	Record	Pct.	Last Victory	Streak
College of Charleston	40–57	.412	2009–10	L10
Furman	87–128	.405	2017–18	L6
VMI	59–57	.509	2020–21	W1

=== Records vs conference rivals ===
Excludes Furman and VMI, listed above
East Tennessee State, Mercer and VMI become SoCon members in basketball for the 2014 season.

Opponent	Record	Pct.	Last Victory	Streak
Chattanooga	19–68	.218	2020–21	L1
East Tennessee State	18–48	.273	2020–21	W1
Mercer	7–20	.259	2018–19	L4
Samford	12–13	.480	2018–19	L3
UNC Greensboro	9–33	.214	2014–15	L16
Western Carolina	38–44	.463	2020–21	W2
Wofford	50–62	.446	2020–21	L1

=== Records vs in-state rivals ===
Division 1, non-SoCon only

Opponent	Record	Pct.	Last Victory	Streak
Charleston Southern	19–17	.528	2008–09	L4
Clemson	23–60	.277	1978–79	L16
Coastal Carolina	4–6	.400	2001–02	L2
Presbyterian	49–24	.671	2020–21	W2
South Carolina	24–76	.240	1988–89	L13
South Carolina State	8–3	.727	2010–11	W1
USC Upstate	4–0	1.000	2016–17	W4
Winthrop	4–4	.500	1997–98	L2

== Notable seasons ==
- 1926–27 The Citadel Bulldogs basketball team - first and only Conference Tournament championship
- 1966–67 The Citadel Bulldogs basketball team - Chronicled in Pat Conroy's My Losing Season
- 1978–79 The Citadel Bulldogs basketball team - first 20 win season
- 2008–09 The Citadel Bulldogs basketball team - second 20 win season; first postseason appearance
