= Chattanooga Mocs men's basketball statistical leaders =

The Chattanooga Mocs men's basketball statistical leaders are individual statistical leaders of the Chattanooga Mocs men's basketball program in various categories, including points, rebounds, assists, steals, and blocks. Within those areas, the lists identify single-game, single-season, and career leaders. The Mocs represent the University of Tennessee at Chattanooga in the NCAA's Southern Conference.

Chattanooga Mocs began competing in intercollegiate basketball in 1915. However, the school's record book does not generally list records from before the 1950s, as records from before this period are often incomplete and inconsistent. Since scoring was much lower in this era, and teams played much fewer games during a typical season, it is likely that few or no players from this era would appear on these lists anyway.

The NCAA did not officially record assists as a stat until the 1983–84 season, and blocks and steals until the 1985–86 season, but Chattanooga's record books includes players in these stats before these seasons. These lists are updated through the end of the 2020–21 season.

== Scoring ==
Career
Rk	Player	Points	Seasons
1	Wayne Golden	2,384	1973–74 1974–75 1975–76 1976–77
2	William Gordon	2,140	1973–74 1974–75 1975–76 1976–77
3	Willie White	1,969	1980–81 1981–82 1982–83 1983–84
4	David Jean-Baptiste	1,752	2017–18 2018–19 2019–20 2020–21 2021–22
5	David Bryan	1,648	1965–66 1966–67 1967–68 1968–69
6	Gerald Wilkins	1,449	1982–83 1983–84 1984–85
	Brandon Born	1,449	1990–91 1991–92 1992–93 1993–94 1994–95
	Walter McGary	1,449	1971–72 1972–73 1973–74
9	Nicchaeus Doaks	1,411	2005–06 2006–07 2007–08 2008–09
10	Ralph Simpson	1,400	1969–70 1970–71 1971–72 1972–73

Season
Rk	Player	Points	Season
1	William Gordon	700	1976–77
2	Malachi Smith	696	2021–22
3	Gerald Wilkins	672	1984–85
4	Wayne Golden	657	1976–77
5	Wayne Golden	635	1974–75
6	Stephen McDowell	633	2008–09
7	Chad Copeland	604	1993–94
8	Wayne Golden	585	1975–76
9	Walter McGary	584	1971–72
10	Larry Barnett	580	1964–65
	Keith Nelson	580	1990–91

Single game
Rk	Player	Points	Season	Opponent
1	Oliver Morton	50	2000–01	Pikeville
2	John Oliver	42	1994–95	Georgia Southern
3	Wayne Golden	41	1975–76	Nicholls State
	Z. Mason	41	2013–14	Hiwassee
	Ricky Taylor	41	2010–11	UNCG
6	Dick Sander	40	1967–68	Quantico Marines
7	Ron Peeples	39	1960–61	Bryan
	William Gordon	39	1973–74	Mercer
9	Joe Pollock	38	1961–62	North Alabama
	Dick Sander	38	1966–67	Lincoln Memorial
	Stephen McDowell	38	2008–09	Niagara
	Maurio Hanson	38	1994–95	Memphis

== Rebounds ==
Career
Rk	Player	Rebounds	Seasons
1	David Bryan	1,059	1965–66 1966–67 1967–68 1968–69
2	Walter McGary	937	1971–72 1972–73 1973–74
3	Nicchaeus Doaks	821	2005–06 2006–07 2007–08 2008–09
	Gary Stitch	821	1973–74 1974–75 1975–76 1976–77
5	Wayne Golden	768	1973–74 1974–75 1975–76 1976–77
6	Lance Fulse	747	1984–85 1985–86 1986–87 1987–88
7	Z. Mason	683	2011–12 2012–13 2013–14
8	Casey Jones	662	2012–13 2013–14 2014–15 2015–16 2016–17
9	Khalil Hartwell	653	2005–06 2006–07 2007–08 2008–09
10	Tom Losh	599	1967–68 1968–69 1969–70 1970–71

Season
Rk	Player	Rebounds	Season
1	Walter McGary	347	1972–73
2	Clarence Howard	339	1970–71
3	Walter McGary	336	1971–72
4	David Bryan	319	1967–68
5	Carmon Davidson	313	1958–59
6	David Bryan	305	1968–69
7	Nicchaeus Doaks	302	2008–09
8	Lance Fulse	300	1987–88
	Z. Mason	300	2013–14
10	Sam Alexis	299	2023–24

Single game
Rk	Player	Rebounds	Season	Opponent
1	Carmon Davidson	30	1958–59	North Alabama
2	Carmon Davidson	29	1958–59	Rhodes
	Larry Barnett	29	1964–65	Middle Tennessee
4	Clarence Howard	27	1970–71	Furman
5	Carmon Davidson	25	1958–59	St. Bernard's
	David Bryan	25	1967–68	Lipscomb
	David Bryan	25	1967–68	Lincoln Memorial
8	Walter McGary	24	1972–73	Southern Miss
9	Chet Rysedorph	23	1962–63	Tennessee Tech
10	Ron Peeples	22	1958–59	Berry
	Carmon Davidson	22	1959–60	Georgia State

== Assists ==
Career
Rk	Player	Assists	Seasons
1	Keegan Bell	538	2009–10 2010–11 2011–12
2	Tim Brooks	414	1991–92 1992–93
	Wes Moore	414	1995–96 1996–97 1997–98 1998–99
4	Casey Long	386	2003–04 2004–05 2005–06 2006–07
5	Greg Pryor	343	2013–14 2014–15 2015–16 2016–17
6	Maurice Head	340	1983–84 1984–85 1985–86 1986–87
7	David Jean-Baptiste	336	2017–18 2018–19 2019–20 2020–21 2021–22
8	Ray Trowell	322	2002–03 2003–04
9	Gary Robb	303	1992–93 1993–94
10	A.J. Caldwell	289	2018–19 2019–20 2020–21 2021–22 2022–23

Season
Rk	Player	Assists	Season
1	Tim Brooks	209	1992–93
2	Tim Brooks	205	1991–92
3	Keegan Bell	197	2011–12
4	Keegan Bell	182	2010–11
5	Ray Trowell	180	2002–03
6	Tyrone Enoch	174	1990–91
7	Keegan Bell	159	2009–10
8	Maurice Head	157	1986–87
9	Gary Robb	155	1993–94
10	Gary Robb	148	1992–93

Single game
Rk	Player	Assists	Season	Opponent
1	Gary Robb	17	1992–93	Southern
2	Ralph Simpson	16	1972–73	Southern Miss
	Tim Brooks	16	1991–92	Western Carolina
	Keegan Bell	16	2011–12	Longwood
5	Darryl Yarbrough	14	1978–79	Tennessee Wesleyan
	Rodney Chatman	14	2017–18	Jacksonville State
7	Keegan Bell	13	2010–11	Appalachian State
	Ray Trowell	13	2002–03	ETSU
	Tim Brooks	13	1992–93	VMI
	Tyrone Enoch	13	1990–91	ETSU

== Steals ==
Career
Rk	Player	Steals	Seasons
1	Wes Moore	198	1995–96 1996–97 1997–98 1998–99
2	Willie White	193	1980–81 1981–82 1982–83 1983–84
3	Greg Pryor	170	2013–14 2014–15 2015–16 2016–17
4	Casey Long	163	2003–04 2004–05 2005–06 2006–07
5	Tim Brooks	155	1991–92 1992–93
6	David Jean-Baptiste	152	2017–18 2018–19 2019–20 2020–21 2021–22
7	Brandon Born	135	1990–91 1991–92 1992–93 1993–94 1994–95
8	Gerald Wilkins	129	1982–83 1983–84 1984–85
	Tre McLean	129	2014–15 2015–16 2016–17
10	Chris McCray	125	1980–81 1981–82 1982–83 1983–84

Season
Rk	Player	Steals	Season
1	Tim Brooks	83	1991–92
2	Tim Brooks	72	1992–93
3	Morris Lyons	63	1987–88
	Tyrone Enoch	63	1990–91
5	Nick Morken	62	1980–81
6	Brandon Born	61	1994–95
7	Willie White	60	1983–84
	Willie Young	60	1996–97
	Malachi Smith	60	2021–22
10	Gerald Wilkins	59	1984–85

Single game
Rk	Player	Steals	Season	Opponent
1	Brandon Born	10	1994–95	USC-Aiken
2	Gerald Wilkins	8	1984–85	VMI
3	Dontay Hampton	7	2011–12	Warren Wilson
	Nick Morken	7	1980–81	Georgia Southern
	Jason Rogan	7	2003–04	UNCG
	Tim Brooks	7	1991–92	VMI
	Willie Young	7	1996–97	Georgia Southern
	Toot Young	7	2001–02	Western Carolina

== Blocks ==
Career
Rk	Player	Blocks	Seasons
1	Justin Tuoyo	270	2014–15 2015–16 2016–17
2	Stanley Lawrence	132	1979–80 1980–81 1981–82 1982–83
3	Z. Mason	129	2011–12 2012–13 2013–14
4	Otis Donald	118	1997–98 1998–99 1999–00
5	Neil Ashby	110	2000–01 2001–02
6	Nicchaeus Doaks	98	2005–06 2006–07 2007–08 2008–09
7	Casey Jones	93	2012–13 2013–14 2014–15 2015–16 2016–17
8	Sam Alexis	89	2022–23 2023–24
9	Roger Smith	86	1993–94 1994–95
10	Aaron Morgan	71	2001–02 2002–03

Season
Rk	Player	Blocks	Season
1	Justin Tuoyo	104	2014–15
2	Z. Mason	92	2013–14
3	Neil Ashby	89	2001–02
	Justin Tuoyo	89	2016–17
5	Justin Tuoyo	77	2015–16
6	Sam Alexis	70	2023–24
7	Otis Donald	66	1998–99
8	Aaron Morgan	60	2002–03
9	Roger Smith	55	1994–95
10	Jake Stephens	53	2022–23

Single game
Rk	Player	Blocks	Season	Opponent
1	Neil Ashby	10	2001–02	Murray State
2	Justin Tuoyo	9	2014–15	Western Carolina
3	Neil Ashby	7	2001–02	Western Carolina
	Neil Ashby	7	2001–02	Weber State
	Otis Donald	7	1998–99	The Citadel
	Stanley Lawrence	7	1980–81	The Citadel
	Justin Tuoyo	7	2016–17	Western Carolina
