= 1980–81 Chattanooga Mocs basketball team =

American college basketball season

1980–81 Chattanooga Mocs basketball

SoCon regular season and tournament champions

NCAA tournament, First round
- Conference: Southern Conference
- South
- Record: 21–9 (11–5 SoCon)
- Head coach: Murray Arnold (2nd season)
- Home arena: Maclellan Gymnasium

1980–81 Southern Conference men's basketball standings
	Conf.				Overall
Team	W		L	PCT	W		L	PCT
Chattanooga †	11	–	5	.688	21	–	9	.700
Davidson	11	–	5	.688	13	–	14	.481
Appalachian State	11	–	5	.688	20	–	9	.690
East Tennessee State	9	–	7	.563	13	–	14	.481
Western Carolina	9	–	7	.563	18	–	10	.643
Furman	8	–	8	.500	11	–	16	.407
Marshall	8	–	8	.500	18	–	10	.643
VMI	3	–	13	.188	4	–	23	.148
The Citadel	2	–	14	.125	9	–	17	.346
† 1981 Southern Conference Tournament winner Rankings from AP poll

The 1980–81 Chattanooga Mocs basketball team represented the University of Tennessee at Chattanooga as a member of the Southern Conference during the 1980–81 NCAA Division I men's basketball season. Their head coach was Murray Arnold and the team played their home games at Maclellan Gymnasium. The Mocs won the regular season and SoCon tournament titles, the latter earning the Mocs an automatic bid to the 1981 NCAA tournament. Participating in the Big Dance for the first time in program history, Chattanooga fell to No. 6 seed Maryland in the opening round.

== Roster ==
1980–81 Chattanooga Mocs men's basketball team
Players
Coaches

Pos.	#	Name	Height	Weight	Year	Previous school	Hometown
G	12	Chris McCray	6 ft 1 in (1.85 m)	170 lb (77 kg)	Fr	Escambia	Pensacola, Florida
G	15	Calvin Cochran	6 ft 4 in (1.93 m)	175 lb (79 kg)	Jr	Ooltewah	Ooltewah, Tennessee
G	20	Nick Morken	6 ft 2 in (1.88 m)	170 lb (77 kg)	Jr	Connersville	Connersville, Indiana
G	22	William Clark	6 ft 3 in (1.91 m)	205 lb (93 kg)	So	Evander Childs	Bronx, New York
G	24	Glenn Washington	6 ft 4 in (1.93 m)	165 lb (75 kg)	So	Booker T. Washington	Pensacola, Florida
F	30	Eric Smith	6 ft 4 in (1.93 m)	190 lb (86 kg)	Sr	Trinity	Louisville, Kentucky
C	32	Kevin Hicks	6 ft 10 in (2.08 m)	220 lb (100 kg)	RS So	North Sand Mountain	Bryant, Alabama
F	34	Randy Harris	6 ft 6 in (1.98 m)	185 lb (84 kg)	So	Henry County	Paris, Tennessee
C	40	Stanley Lawrence	6 ft 8 in (2.03 m)	210 lb (95 kg)	So	Jesup	Jesup, Georgia
G	41	Donel Cochran	6 ft 5 in (1.96 m)	175 lb (79 kg)	Fr	Ooltewah	Ooltewah, Tennessee
F	42	James Jones	6 ft 5 in (1.96 m)	200 lb (91 kg)	Sr	North Hardin	Hixson, Tennessee
G	44	Willie White	6 ft 3 in (1.91 m)	190 lb (86 kg)	Fr	Carver	Memphis, Tennessee
F	51	Mark Maynor	6 ft 4 in (1.93 m)	185 lb (84 kg)	Sr	Red Bank	Chattanooga, Tennessee
F/C	52	Russ Schoene	6 ft 10 in (2.08 m)	210 lb (95 kg)	Jr	Wesclin	Trenton, Illinois
F	54	Stanford Strickland	6 ft 6 in (1.98 m)	200 lb (91 kg)	Fr	Howard	Chattanooga, Tennessee

Head coach

- Murray Arnold

Assistant coach(es)

Legend

- (C) Team captain
- (S) Suspended
- (I) Ineligible
- (W) Walk-on
- Injured
- Current redshirt

Roster

== Schedule and results ==
Date time, TV	Rank^{#}	Opponent^{#}	Result	Record	Site (attendance) city, state
Regular season
Nov 29, 1980*		Maryville	W 82–53	1–0	Maclellan Gymnasium; Chattanooga, Tennessee
Dec 1, 1980*		at Middle Tennessee	L 67–73	1–1	Murphy Center; Murfreesboro, Tennessee
Dec 6, 1980		VMI	W 63–53	2–1 (1–0)	Maclellan Gymnasium; Chattanooga, Tennessee
Dec 13, 1980*		Tennessee Temple	W 101–78	3–1	Maclellan Gymnasium; Chattanooga, Tennessee
Dec 15, 1980*		Tennessee State	W 83–62	4–1	Maclellan Gymnasium; Chattanooga, Tennessee
Dec 17, 1980		at Davidson	L 84–93	4–2 (1–1)	Johnston Gym; Davidson, North Carolina
Dec 19, 1980*		vs. Georgia	L 68–77	4–3	Omni Coliseum; Atlanta, Georgia
Dec 20, 1980*		vs. Missouri	L 62–64	4–4	Omni Coliseum (4,075); Atlanta, Georgia
Dec 29, 1980*		Georgia Southern	W 75–57	5–4	Maclellan Gymnasium; Chattanooga, Tennessee
Dec 30, 1980*		Mercer	W 60–58 ^{OT}	6–4	Maclellan Gymnasium; Chattanooga, Tennessee
Jan 2, 1981		Furman	W 81–72	7–4 (2–1)	Maclellan Gymnasium; Chattanooga, Tennessee
Jan 5, 1981		The Citadel	W 65–64	8–4 (3–1)	Maclellan Gymnasium; Chattanooga, Tennessee
Jan 10, 1981		Appalachian State	W 86–58	9–4 (4–1)	Maclellan Gymnasium; Chattanooga, Tennessee
Jan 12, 1981		Marshall	W 95–79	10–4 (5–1)	Maclellan Gymnasium; Chattanooga, Tennessee
Jan 14, 1981*		at Tennessee State	W 71–58	11–4	Gentry Complex; Nashville, Tennessee
Jan 19, 1981		at The Citadel	W 85–76	12–4 (6–1)	McAlister Field House; Charleston, South Carolina
Jan 24, 1981		at Furman	L 90–96	12–5 (6–2)	Greenville Memorial Auditorium; Greenville, South Carolina
Jan 27, 1981		at Western Carolina	L 70–76	12–6 (6–3)	Reid Gymnasium; Cullowhee, North Carolina
Jan 31, 1981		East Tennessee State	L 75–77	12–7 (6–4)	Memorial Center; Johnson City, Tennessee
Feb 2, 1981		at Appalachian State	W 61–56	13–7 (7–4)	Varsity Gymnasium; Boone, North Carolina
Feb 7, 1981		Davidson	W 99–75	14–7 (8–4)	Maclellan Gymnasium; Chattanooga, Tennessee
Feb 9, 1981		East Tennessee State	L 81–88	14–8 (8–5)	Maclellan Gymnasium; Chattanooga, Tennessee
Feb 12, 1981		Western Carolina	W 90–74	15–8 (9–5)	Maclellan Gymnasium; Chattanooga, Tennessee
Feb 14, 1981		at Marshall	W 89–77	16–8 (10–5)	Veterans Memorial Fieldhouse; Huntington, West Virginia
Feb 16, 1981		at VMI	W 90–68	17–8 (11–5)	Cormack Field House; Lexington, Virginia
Feb 21, 1981*		Middle Tennessee State	W 72–70	18–8	Maclellan Gymnasium; Chattanooga, Tennessee
SoCon tournament
Feb 28, 1981*	(1)	(8) VMI; Quarterfinals	W 89–63	19–8	Maclellan Gymnasium; Chattanooga, Tennessee
Mar 6, 1981*	(1)	vs. (5) Western Carolina; Semifinals	W 79–70	20–8	Roanoke Civic Center; Roanoke, Virginia
Mar 7, 1981*	(1)	vs. (3) Appalachian State; Championship game	W 59–55	21–8	Roanoke Civic Center; Roanoke, Virginia
NCAA tournament
Mar 12, 1981*	(11 ME)	vs. (6 ME) No. 18 Maryland; First round	L 69–81	21–9	University of Dayton Arena; Dayton, Ohio
*Non-conference game. ^{#}Rankings from AP poll. (#) Tournament seedings in parentheses. ME=Mideast. All times are in Eastern Time.
