= 1980–81 Marshall Thundering Herd men's basketball team =

American college basketball season

1980–81 Marshall Thundering Herd men's basketball
- Conference: Southern Conference
- Record: 18–10 (8–8 SoCon)
- Head coach: Bob Zuffelato (2nd season)
- Assistant coaches: C. J. Woollum; Stan Pelcher; Jim Kelly
- Home arena: Cam Henderson Center

1980–81 Southern Conference men's basketball standings
| | Conf. | | | | Overall |
| Team | W | | L | PCT | W | | L | PCT |
|---|---|---|---|---|---|---|---|---|
| Chattanooga † | 11 | – | 5 | .688 | 21 | – | 9 | .700 |
| Davidson | 11 | – | 5 | .688 | 13 | – | 14 | .481 |
| Appalachian State | 11 | – | 5 | .688 | 20 | – | 9 | .690 |
| East Tennessee State | 9 | – | 7 | .563 | 13 | – | 14 | .481 |
| Western Carolina | 9 | – | 7 | .563 | 18 | – | 10 | .643 |
| Furman | 8 | – | 8 | .500 | 11 | – | 16 | .407 |
| Marshall | 8 | – | 8 | .500 | 18 | – | 10 | .643 |
| VMI | 3 | – | 13 | .188 | 4 | – | 23 | .148 |
| The Citadel | 2 | – | 14 | .125 | 9 | – | 17 | .346 |
† 1981 Southern Conference Tournament winner Rankings from AP poll

The 1980–81 Marshall Thundering Herd men's basketball team represented Marshall University during the 1980–81 NCAA Division I men's basketball season. The Thundering Herd, led by second-year head coach Bob Zuffelato, played their home games at the Cam Henderson Center as members of the Southern Conference. They finished the season 18–10, 8–8 in SoCon play to finish tied in seventh place.

== Roster ==
1980–81 Marshall Thundering Herd men's basketball team
Players
Coaches

| Pos. | # | Name | Height | Weight | Year | Hometown |
|---|---|---|---|---|---|---|
| F | 25 | Ken Labanowski | 6 ft 8 in (2.03 m) | 220 lb (100 kg) | Sr | Oyster Bay, New York |
| G | 10 | Greg White | 6 ft 0 in (1.83 m) | 165 lb (75 kg) | Sr | Mullens, West Virginia |
| F | | George Washington | 6 ft 4 in (1.93 m) | — | Jr |
| G | | LaVerne Evans | 6 ft 4 in (1.93 m) | — | Fr |
| C | | Charles Jones | 6 ft 8 in (2.03 m) | — | So |
| F | | David Wade | 6 ft 5 in (1.96 m) | — | Fr |
| C | | Larry Watson | 6 ft 8 in (2.03 m) | — | Jr |
| F | | Barry Kincaid | 6 ft 6 in (1.98 m) | — | So |
| G | | Sam Henry | 6 ft 0 in (1.83 m) | — | Fr |
| G | | Jeff Oplinger | 6 ft 0 in (1.83 m) | — | Sr |
| C | | Ron Gilmore | 6 ft 10 in (2.08 m) | — | Sr |
| | | Scott Haga | — | — |
| G | | Gary Hines | 5 ft 9 in (1.75 m) | — | Jr |

Head coach

- Bob Zuffelato

Assistant coach(es)

- C. J. Woollum
- Stan Pelcher
- Jim Kelly

Legend

- (C) Team captain
- (S) Suspended
- (I) Ineligible
- (W) Walk-on
- Injured
- Current redshirt

Roster

== Schedule ==
| Date time, TV | Rank^{#} | Opponent^{#} | Result | Record | Site city, state |
Regular season
| Nov 28, 1980* | | at Charleston (W.Va.) | W 74–54 | 1–0 | |
| Dec 1, 1980* | | South Carolina | W 116–85 | 2–0 | Cam Henderson Center; Huntington, WV |
| Dec 6, 1980* | | at West Virginia | W 76–73 | 3–0 | WVU Coliseum; Morgantown, WV |
| Dec 8, 1980 | | Davidson | L 73–79 | 3–1 (0–1) | Cam Henderson Center; Huntington, WV |
| Dec 13, 1980* | | Ohio Wesleyan | W 95–69 | 4–1 | Cam Henderson Center; Huntington, WV |
| Dec 15, 1980* | | Morehead State | W 95–85 | 5–1 | Cam Henderson Center; Huntington, WV |
| Dec 20, 1980* | | Pitt-Johnstown | W 109–87 | 6–1 | Cam Henderson Center; Huntington, WV |
| Dec 22, 1980* | | at Ohio | W 65–59 | 7–1 | Convocation Center; Athens, OH |
| Dec 29, 1980* | | at No. 9 Maryland | L 89–114 | 7–2 | Cole Fieldhouse; College Park, Maryland |
| Dec 30, 1980* | | vs. Bowling Green State | W 87–85 | 8–2 | Cole Fieldhouse; College Park, Maryland |
| Jan 3, 1981 | | VMI | W 90–81 | 9–2 (1–1) | Cam Henderson Center; Huntington, WV |
| Jan 5, 1981 | | Appalachian State | W 58–56 | 10–2 (2–1) | Cam Henderson Center; Huntington, WV |
| Jan 10, 1981 | | at Davidson | L 76–104 | 10–3 (2–2) | Johnston Gym; Davidson, NC |
| Jan 12, 1981 | | at Chattanooga | L 79–95 | 10–4 (2–3) | Maclellan Gymnasium; Chattanooga, Tennessee |
| Jan 17, 1981 | | East Tennessee State | W 78–66 | 11–4 (3–3) | Cam Henderson Center; Huntington, WV |
| Jan 19, 1981 | | Furman | W 98–80 | 12–4 (4–3) | Cam Henderson Center; Huntington, WV |
| Jan 24, 1981 | | at Appalachian State | L 56–75 | 12–5 (4–4) | Varsity Gymnasium; Boone, North Carolina |
| Jan 26, 1981 | | at VMI | W 63–53 | 13–5 (5–4) | VMI Field House; Lexington, Virginia |
| Jan 31, 1981 | | The Citadel | W 76–60 | 14–5 (6–4) | Cam Henderson Center; Huntington, WV |
| Feb 2, 1981 | | Western Carolina | W 82–74 | 15–5 (7–4) | Cam Henderson Center; Huntington, WV |
| Feb 7, 1981 | | at East Tennessee State | L 75–76 | 15–6 (7–5) | Memorial Center; Johnson City, TN |
| Feb 9, 1981 | | at Western Carolina | L 78–80 | 15–7 (7–6) | Cullowhee, NC |
| Feb 14, 1981 | | Chattanooga | L 77–89 | 15–8 (7–7) | Cam Henderson Center; Huntington, WV |
| Feb 16, 1981* | | Liberty | W 75–63 | 16–8 | Cam Henderson Center; Huntington, WV |
| Feb 19, 1981 | | at Furman | L 90–92 | 16–9 (7–8) | Greenville Memorial Auditorium; Greenville, SC |
| Feb 23, 1981 | | at The Citadel | W 87–79 | 17–9 (8–8) | McAlister Field House; Charleston, SC |
SoCon tournament
| Feb 28, 1981* | (7) | at (2) Davidson; Quarterfinals | W 90–77 | 18–9 | Roanoke Civic Center; Roanoke, VA |
| Mar 6, 1981* | (7) | vs. (3) Appalachian State; Semifinals | L 62–77 | 18–10 | Roanoke Civic Center; Roanoke, VA |
*Non-conference game. ^{#}Rankings from AP Poll. (#) Tournament seedings in parentheses. All times are in Eastern Time.
