= The Citadel Bulldogs basketball, 1980–1984 =

The Citadel Bulldogs basketball teams represented The Citadel, The Military College of South Carolina in Charleston, South Carolina, United States. The program was established in 1900–01, and has continuously fielded a team since 1912–13. Their primary rivals are College of Charleston, Furman and VMI.

== 1979–80 ==
1979–80 The Citadel Bulldogs men's basketball
- Conference: Southern Conference
- Record: 14–13 (6–10 SoCon)
- Head coach: Les Robinson
- Home arena: McAlister Field House

1979–80 Southern Conference men's basketball standings
	Conf.				Overall
Team	W		L	PCT	W		L	PCT
Furman †	14	–	1	.933	23	–	7	.767
Marshall	10	–	6	.625	17	–	12	.586
Western Carolina	9	–	7	.563	17	–	10	.630
East Tennessee State	8	–	7	.533	15	–	13	.536
Chattanooga	7	–	9	.438	13	–	14	.481
Appalachian State	6	–	10	.375	12	–	16	.429
The Citadel	6	–	10	.375	14	–	13	.519
VMI	6	–	10	.375	11	–	16	.407
Davidson	4	–	11	.267	8	–	18	.308
† 1980 Southern Conference Tournament winner Rankings from AP poll

Date time, TV	Opponent	Result	Record	Site city, state
November 30*	Piedmont	W 69–56	1–0	McAlister Field House; Charleston, SC
Dec 4*	USC Aiken	W 98–84	2–0	McAlister Field House; Charleston, SC
Dec 5*	South Carolina State	W 73–67	3–0	McAlister Field House; Charleston, SC
Dec 8	Furman	W 88–9	3–1 (0–1)	McAlister Field House; Charleston, SC
Dec 10*	at Baptist	W 68–62	4–1	CSU Field House; North Charleston, SC
Dec 15*	Wofford	W 90–79	5–1	McAlister Field House; Charleston, SC
Jan 5*	UNC Greensboro	W 81–63	6–1	McAlister Field House; Charleston, SC
Jan 7	at Chattanooga	L 51–68	6–2 (0–2)	Maclellan Gymnasium; Chattanooga, TN
Jan 12	Western Carolina	W 85–73	7–2 (1–2)	McAlister Field House; Charleston, SC
Jan 14	Appalachian State	W 54–53	8–2 (2–2)	McAlister Field House; Charleston, SC
Jan 16	Davidson	W 77–72	9–2 (3–2)	McAlister Field House; Charleston, SC
Jan 19	at Furman	L 55–82	9–3 (3–3)	Greenville Memorial Auditorium; Greenville, SC
Jan 21	Chattanooga	W 52–51	10–3 (4–3)	McAlister Field House; Charleston, SC
Jan 23	at Western Carolina	L 60–79	10–4 (4–4)	Cullowhee, NC
Jan 26	at Marshall	L 59–68	10–5 (4–5)	Veterans Memorial Fieldhouse; Huntington, WV
Jan 28	at VMI	L 71–72	10–6 (4–6)	Cormack Field House; Lexington, VA
Jan 30	East Tennessee State	L 52–54	10–7 (4–7)	McAlister Field House; Charleston, SC
Feb 1*	vs. No. 11 North Carolina; North-South Doubleheader	L 40–51	10–8	Charlotte Coliseum; Charlotte, NC
Feb 2*	vs. NC State; North-South Doubleheader	L 35–57	10–9	Charlotte Coliseum; Charlotte, NC
Feb 4*	Coastal Carolina	W 90–70	11–9	McAlister Field House; Charleston, SC
Feb 6	Davidson	W 98–88 ^{OT}	12–9 (5–7)	Charlotte, NC
Feb 9	at Appalachian State	L 57–73	12–10 (5–8)	Varsity Gymnasium; Boone, NC
Feb 11	at East Tennessee State	L 49–58	12–11 (5–9)	Memorial Center; Johnson City, TN
Feb 13*	Baptist	W 62–52	13–11	McAlister Field House; Charleston, SC
Feb 16	VMI	W 79–77 ^{OT}	14–11 (6–9)	McAlister Field House; Charleston, SC
Feb 18	Marshall	L 74–78 ^{OT}	14–12 (6–10)	McAlister Field House; Charleston, SC
1980 Southern Conference men's basketball tournament
Feb 23	at Marshall	L 66–100	14–13	Veterans Memorial Fieldhouse; Huntington, WV
*Non-conference game. (#) Tournament seedings in parentheses. All times are in Eastern Time.

== 1980–81 ==
1980–81 The Citadel Bulldogs men's basketball
- Conference: Southern Conference
- Record: 9–17 (2–14 SoCon)
- Head coach: Les Robinson
- Home arena: McAlister Field House

1980–81 Southern Conference men's basketball standings
	Conf.				Overall
Team	W		L	PCT	W		L	PCT
Chattanooga †	11	–	5	.688	21	–	9	.700
Davidson	11	–	5	.688	13	–	14	.481
Appalachian State	11	–	5	.688	20	–	9	.690
East Tennessee State	9	–	7	.563	13	–	14	.481
Western Carolina	9	–	7	.563	18	–	10	.643
Furman	8	–	8	.500	11	–	16	.407
Marshall	8	–	8	.500	18	–	10	.643
VMI	3	–	13	.188	4	–	23	.148
The Citadel	2	–	14	.125	9	–	17	.346
† 1981 Southern Conference Tournament winner Rankings from AP poll

Date time, TV	Opponent	Result	Record	Site city, state
Dec 1*	Piedmont	W 56–45	1–0	McAlister Field House; Charleston, SC
Dec 3*	Bethune-Cookman	W 67–57	2–0	McAlister Field House; Charleston, SC
Dec 6*	USC Upstate	W 75–70	3–0	McAlister Field House; Charleston, SC
Dec 13*	Coastal Carolina	W 71–66	4–0	McAlister Field House; Charleston, SC
Dec 19*	at South Carolina; Palmetto Classic	L 81–83 ^{3OT}	4–1	Carolina Coliseum; Columbia, SC
Dec 20*	vs. South Carolina State; Palmetto Classic	W 66–65	5–1	Carolina Coliseum; Columbia, SC
Jan 6	at Chattanooga	L 64–65	5–2 (0–1)	Maclellan Gymnasium; Chattanooga, TN
Jan 7	at Furman	L 65–75	5–3 (0–2)	Greenville Memorial Auditorium; Greenville, SC
Jan 12	VMI	L 49–58	5–4 (0–3)	McAlister Field House; Charleston, SC
Jan 14*	at No. 19 Clemson	L 58–82	5–5	Littlejohn Coliseum; Clemson, SC
Jan 17	Western Carolina	W 61–59	6–5 (1–3)	McAlister Field House; Charleston, SC
Jan 19	Chattanooga	L 76–85	6–6 (1–4)	McAlister Field House; Charleston, SC
Jan 22*	at Wofford	W 65–64	7–6	Spartanburg, SC
Jan 24	at East Tennessee State	L 66–91	7–7 (1–5)	Memorial Center; Johnson City, TN
Jan 26	Furman	L 65–67	7–8 (1–6)	McAlister Field House; Charleston, SC
Jan 28	Davidson	W 72–58	8–8 (2–6)	McAlister Field House; Charleston, SC
Jan 31	at Marshall	L 60–76	8–9 (2–7)	Veterans Memorial Fieldhouse; Huntington, WV
Feb 2	at VMI	L 62–65	8–10 (2–8)	Cormack Field House; Lexington, VA
Feb 4*	Presbyterian	W 75–65	9–10	McAlister Field House; Charleston, SC
Feb 7	at Appalachian State	L 41–48	9–11 (2–9)	Varsity Gymnasium; Boone, NC
Feb 14	Appalachian State	L 54–66	9–12 (2–10)	McAlister Field House; Charleston, SC
Feb 16	East Tennessee State	L 66–70 ^{OT}	9–13 (2–11)	McAlister Field House; Charleston, SC
Feb 18	at Davidson	L 61–63	9–14 (2–12)	Johnston Gym; Davidson, NC
Feb 21	at Western Carolina	L 62–70	9–15 (2–13)	Cullowhee, NC
Feb 23	Marshall	L 79–87	9–16 (2–14)	McAlister Field House; Charleston, SC
Feb 25	Baptist	L 62–67	9–17	McAlister Field House; Charleston, SC
*Non-conference game. (#) Tournament seedings in parentheses. All times are in Eastern Time.

== 1981–82 ==
1981–82 The Citadel Bulldogs men's basketball
- Conference: Southern Conference
- Record: 14–14 (7–9 SoCon)
- Head coach: Les Robinson
- Home arena: McAlister Field House

1981–82 Southern Conference men's basketball standings
	Conf.				Overall
Team	W		L	PCT	W		L	PCT
Chattanooga †	15	–	1	.938	27	–	4	.871
Western Carolina	11	–	5	.688	19	–	8	.704
Davidson	9	–	7	.563	14	–	15	.483
East Tennessee State	8	–	8	.500	13	–	15	.464
Marshall	8	–	8	.500	16	–	11	.593
Furman	7	–	9	.438	11	–	16	.407
The Citadel	7	–	9	.438	14	–	14	.500
Appalachian State	6	–	10	.375	11	–	15	.423
VMI	1	–	15	.063	1	–	25	.038
† 1982 SoCon Tournament winner As of April 30, 1982; Rankings from AP poll

Date time, TV	Opponent	Result	Record	Site city, state
Nov 30*	Piedmont	W 66–54	1–0	McAlister Field House; Charleston, SC
Dec 5*	Newberry	W 101–88	2–0	McAlister Field House; Charleston, SC
Dec 7*	Presbyterian	W 68–50	3–0	McAlister Field House; Charleston, SC
Dec 11*	vs. Davidson; First Union Invitational	L 55–63	3–1 (0–1)	Charlotte Coliseum; Charlotte, NC
Dec 12*	vs. Holy Cross; First Union Invitational	W 89–80	4–1	Charlotte Coliseum; Charlotte, NC
Dec 19	Davidson	W 49–47	5–1 (1–1)	McAlister Field House; Charleston, SC
Jan 6*	at Georgia State	W 70–62	6–1	GSU Sports Arena; Atlanta, GA
Jan 9	at Chattanooga	L 72–79	6–2 (1–2)	Maclellan Gymnasium; Chattanooga, TN
Jan 11	Appalachian State	W 83–64	7–2 (2–2)	McAlister Field House; Charleston, SC
Jan 13	East Tennessee State	W 64–52	8–2 (3–2)	McAlister Field House; Charleston, SC
Jan 16	at Marshall	L 61–74	8–3 (3–3)	Cam Henderson Center; Huntington, WV
Jan 18	at VMI	W 72–61	9–3 (4–3)	Cameron Hall; Lexington, VA
Jan 21	Furman	W 69–66	10–3 (5–3)	McAlister Field House; Charleston, SC
Jan 23	at East Tennessee State	L 81–89	10–4 (5–4)	Memorial Center; Johnson City, TN
Jan 25	Chattanooga	L 65–83	10–5 (5–5)	McAlister Field House; Charleston, SC
Jan 29	Western Carolina	L 53–58	10–6 (5–6)	McAlister Field House; Charleston, SC
Jan 30*	Clemson	L 56–88	10–7	McAlister Field House; Charleston, SC
Feb 1	Marshall	W 77–62	11–7 (6–6)	McAlister Field House; Charleston, SC
Feb 5*	vs. No. 17 NC State; North-South Doubleheader	L 44–54	11–8	Charlotte Coliseum; Charlotte, NC
Feb 6*	vs. No. 2 North Carolina; North-South Doubleheader	L 46–67	11–9	Charlotte Coliseum; Charlotte, NC
Feb 13	at Appalachian State	L 46–65	11–10 (6–7)	Varsity Gymnasium; Boone, NC
Feb 15	VMI	W 91–74	12–10 (7–7)	McAlister Field House; Charleston, SC
Feb 17*	USC Aiken	W 107–105 ^{5OT}	13–10	McAlister Field House; Charleston, SC
Feb 20	at Furman	L 64–84	13–11 (7–8)	Greenville Memorial Auditorium; Greenville, SC
Feb 22	at Western Carolina	L 75–83	13–12 (7–9)	Cullowhee, NC
Feb 24*	at South Carolina	L 57–62	13–13	Carolina Coliseum; Columbia, SC
1982 Southern Conference men's basketball tournament
Feb 27	at Western Carolina	W 66–62 ^{OT}	14–13	Cullowhee, NC
Feb 28	vs. Davidson	L 54–57	14–14	Cam Henderson Center; Huntington, WV
*Non-conference game. (#) Tournament seedings in parentheses. All times are in Eastern Time.

== 1982–83 ==
1982–83 The Citadel Bulldogs men's basketball
- Conference: Southern Conference
- Record: 12–16 (7–9 SoCon)
- Head coach: Les Robinson
- Home arena: McAlister Field House

1982–83 Southern Conference men's basketball standings
	Conf.				Overall
Team	W		L	PCT	W		L	PCT
No. 15 Chattanooga †	15	–	1	.938	26	–	4	.867
Marshall	13	–	3	.813	20	–	8	.714
East Tennessee State	12	–	4	.750	22	–	9	.710
Western Carolina	9	–	7	.563	17	–	12	.586
Davidson	8	–	8	.500	13	–	15	.464
The Citadel	7	–	9	.438	12	–	16	.429
Furman	4	–	12	.250	9	–	20	.310
Appalachian State	3	–	13	.188	6	–	21	.222
VMI	1	–	15	.063	2	–	25	.074
† 1983 Southern tournament winner As of April 30, 1983; Rankings from AP poll

Date time, TV	Opponent	Result	Record	Site city, state
Nov 29*	Piedmont	W 82–59	1–0	McAlister Field House; Charleston, SC
Dec 1	at Appalachian State	W 60–55	2–0 (1–0)	Varsity Gymnasium; Boone, NC
Dec 4*	at College of Charleston	L 50–63	2–1	John Kresse Arena; Charleston, SC
Dec 6*	at Clemson	L 56–63	2–2	Littlejohn Coliseum; Clemson, SC
Dec 8*	Presbyterian	W 80–74	3–2	McAlister Field House; Charleston, SC
Dec 18	Davidson	L 66–77	3–3 (1–1)	McAlister Field House; Charleston, SC
Dec 20*	Rider	L 59–64 ^{OT}	3–4	McAlister Field House; Charleston, SC
Jan 8*	vs. Campbell	W 68–50	4–4	Winthrop Coliseum; Rock Hill, NC
Jan 10	at East Tennessee State	L 54–57	4–5 (1–2)	Memorial Center; Johnson City, TN
Jan 12*	South Carolina	L 56–60	4–6	McAlister Field House; Charleston, SC
Jan 15	Marshall	L 70–71	4–7 (1–3)	McAlister Field House; Charleston, SC
Jan 17	VMI	W 57–50	5–7 (2–3)	McAlister Field House; Charleston, SC
Jan 19	Chattanooga	L 57–58	5–8 (2–4)	McAlister Field House; Charleston, SC
Jan 22	Furman	W 60–49	6–8 (3–4)	McAlister Field House; Charleston, SC
Jan 26	at Davidson	L 52–57	6–9 (3–5)	Johnston Gym; Davidson, NC
Jan 29	Appalachian State	W 90–72	7–9 (4–5)	McAlister Field House; Charleston, SC
Jan 31	East Tennessee State	W 79–64	8–9 (5–5)	McAlister Field House; Charleston, SC
Feb 4*	vs. No. 1 North Carolina; North-South Doubleheader	L 36–81	8–10	Charlotte Coliseum; Charlotte, NC
Feb 5*	vs. NC State; North-South Doubleheader	L 47–57	8–11	Charlotte Coliseum; Charlotte, NC
Feb 10*	Georgia State	W 79–63	9–11	McAlister Field House; Charleston, SC
Feb 12	at Western Carolina	L 76–87	9–12 (5–6)	Reid Gymnasium; Cullowhee, NC
Feb 14	at Chattanooga	L 68–85	9–13 (5–7)	McKenzie Arena; Chattanooga, TN
Feb 17	Western Carolina	W 83–80 ^{OT}	10–13 (6–7)	McAlister Field House; Charleston, SC
Feb 19	at Furman	W 76–68	11–13 (7–7)	Greenville Memorial Auditorium; Greenville, SC
Feb 22*	College of Charleston	W 66–52	12–13	McAlister Field House; Charleston, SC
Feb 24	at Marshall	L 61–69	12–14 (7–8)	Cam Henderson Center; Huntington, WV
Feb 26	at VMI	L 63–65	12–15 (7–9)	Cameron Hall; Lexington, VA
1983 Southern Conference men's basketball tournament
Mar 10	vs. East Tennessee State	L 65–75	12–16	Cam Henderson Center; Huntington, WV
*Non-conference game. (#) Tournament seedings in parentheses. All times are in Eastern Time.

== 1983–84 ==
1983–84 The Citadel Bulldogs men's basketball
- Conference: Southern Conference
- Record: 14–14 (8–8 SoCon)
- Head coach: Les Robinson
- Home arena: McAlister Field House

1983–84 Southern Conference men's basketball standings
	Conf.				Overall
Team	W		L	PCT	W		L	PCT
Marshall†	13	–	3	.813	25	–	6	.806
Chattanooga	12	–	4	.750	24	–	7	.774
Western Carolina	9	–	7	.563	15	–	13	.536
Appalachian State	8	–	8	.500	13	–	16	.448
The Citadel	8	–	8	.500	14	–	14	.500
Furman	7	–	9	.438	12	–	17	.414
East Tennessee State	6	–	10	.375	9	–	19	.321
Davidson	5	–	11	.313	9	–	19	.321
VMI	4	–	12	.250	8	–	19	.296
† Tournament winner As of April 30, 1984; Rankings from AP poll

Date time, TV	Opponent	Result	Record	Site city, state
Nov 28*	Piedmont	W 105–54	1–0	McAlister Field House; Charleston, SC
Dec 3*	Bapist	W 72–61	2–0	McAlister Field House; Charleston, SC
Dec 7	Chattanooga	L 67–79	2–1 (0–1)	McAlister Field House; Charleston, SC
Dec 10*	at Clemson	L 70–92	2–2	Littlejohn Coliseum; Clemson, SC
Dec 17	Davidson	W 69–63	3–2 (1–1)	McAlister Field House; Charleston, SC
Dec 18*	at South Carolina	L 64–85	3–3	Carolina Coliseum; Columbia, SC
Jan 5*	vs. Francis Marion	L 64–78	3–4	Winthrop Coliseum; Rock Hill, SC
Jan 7*	at Georgia State	W 72–67	4–4	GSU Sports Arena; Atlanta, GA
Jan 9	Marshall	W 84–76	5–4 (2–1)	McAlister Field House; Charleston, SC
Jan 12*	College of Charleston	W 71–62	6–4	McAlister Field House; Charleston, SC
Jan 14	at East Tennessee State	W 75–62	7–4 (3–1)	Memorial Center; Johnson City, TN
Jan 16	at Western Carolina	L 72–84	7–5 (3–2)	Cullowhee, NC
Jan 19	Furman	W 89–83	8–5 (4–2)	McAlister Field House; Charleston, SC
Jan 21	at Appalachian State	L 60–66	8–6 (4–3)	Varsity Gymnasium; Boone, NC
Jan 23	at Davidson	L 60–62	8–7 (4–4)	Johnston Gym; Davidson, NC
Jan 25	at Furman	L 70–96	8–8 (4–5)	Greenville Memorial Auditorium; Greenville, SC
Jan 28	Appalachian State	W 83–69	9–8 (5–5)	McAlister Field House; Charleston, SC
Feb 3*	vs. NC State	L 49–50	9–9	Charlotte, NC; Charlotte, NC
Feb 4*	vs. No. 1 North Carolina	L 60–76	9–10	Charlotte Coliseum; Charlotte, NC
Feb 8	VMI	W 65–61	10–10 (6–5)	McAlister Field House; Charleston, SC
Feb 11	East Tennessee State	W 76–72	11–10 (7–5)	McAlister Field House; Charleston, SC
Feb 13	at Chattanooga	L 83–85	11–11 (7–6)	McKenzie Arena; Chattanooga, TN
Feb 16*	Newberry	W 108–77	12–11	McAlister Field House; Charleston, SC
Feb 18	at Marshall	L 71–85	12–12 (7–7)	Cam Henderson Center; Huntington, WV
Feb 20	at VMI	L 62–64	12–13 (7–8)	Cameron Hall; Lexington, VA
Feb 23	South Carolina State	W 91–78	13–13	McAlister Field House; Charleston, SC
Feb 25	Western Carolina	W 106–101	14–13 (8–8)	McAlister Field House; Charleston, SC
1984 Southern Conference men's basketball tournament
Mar 2	vs. Appalachian State	L 77–82	14–14	Asheville Civic Center; Asheville, NC
*Non-conference game. (#) Tournament seedings in parentheses. All times are in Eastern Time.
