= VMI Keydets basketball, 1980–1989 =

The VMI Keydets basketball teams represented the Virginia Military Institute in Lexington, Virginia. The program began in 1908, and played their games out of Cormack Field House until 1981, when the construction of Cameron Hall was completed. The Keydets were members of the Southern Conference. Their primary rival is The Citadel.

== 1979–80 ==
1979–80 VMI Keydets men's basketball
- Conference: Southern Conference
- Record: 11–16 (6–10 SoCon)
- Head coach: Charlie Schmaus
- Home arena: Cormack Field House

1979–80 Southern Conference men's basketball standings
	Conf.				Overall
Team	W		L	PCT	W		L	PCT
Furman †	14	–	1	.933	23	–	7	.767
Marshall	10	–	6	.625	17	–	12	.586
Western Carolina	9	–	7	.563	17	–	10	.630
East Tennessee State	8	–	7	.533	15	–	13	.536
Chattanooga	7	–	9	.438	13	–	14	.481
Appalachian State	6	–	10	.375	12	–	16	.429
The Citadel	6	–	10	.375	14	–	13	.519
VMI	6	–	10	.375	11	–	16	.407
Davidson	4	–	11	.267	8	–	18	.308
† 1980 Southern Conference Tournament winner Rankings from AP poll

Date time, TV	Opponent	Result	Record	Site city, state
December 1* no, no	Lebanon	W 43–33	1–0	Cormack Field House; Lexington, VA
December 3 no, no	Davidson	L 73–74	1–1 (0–1)	Cormack Field House; Lexington, VA
December 6* no, no	Bluefield	W 99–66	2–1	Cormack Field House; Lexington, VA
December 8 no, no	at Appalachian State	L 57–66	2–2 (0–2)	Varsity Gymnasium; Boone, NC
December 10 no, no	at Chattanooga	W 56–55	3–2 (1–2)	Maclellan Gymnasium; Chattanooga, TN
December 12* no, no	Concord	W 101–80	4–2	Cormack Field House; Lexington, VA
December 15 no, no	Marshall	L 58–60	4–3 (1–3)	Cormack Field House; Lexington, VA
January 5* no, no	at Cleveland State	L 82–102	4–4	Woodling Gym; Cleveland, OH
January 7 no, no	at Davidson	W 70–69 ^{OT}	5–4 (2–3)	Johnston Gym; Davidson, NC
January 10 no, no	at East Tennessee State	L 65–97	5–5 (2–4)	Memorial Center; Johnson City, TN
January 12 no, no	at Marshall	W 75–63	6–5 (3–4)	Veterans Memorial Fieldhouse; Huntington, WV
January 16* no, no	Baptist College	W 102–82	7–5	Cormack Field House; Lexington, VA
January 18* no, no	UVA–Wise	L 76–87	7–6	Cormack Field House; Lexington, VA
January 21 no, no	at Western Carolina	W 72–71	8–6 (4–4)	Cullowhee, NC
January 24* no, no	George Mason	W 95–81	9–6	Cormack Field House; Lexington, VA
January 26 no, no	Furman	L 67–84	9–7 (4–5)	Cormack Field House; Lexington, VA
January 28 no, no	The Citadel	W 72–71	10–7 (5–5)	Cormack Field House; Lexington, VA
January 30* no, no	Baltimore	L 60–71	10–8	Cormack Field House; Lexington, VA
February 2* no, no	at Richmond	L 92–104	10–9	Robins Center; Richmond, VA
February 4 no, no	East Tennessee State	L 78–89	10–10 (5–6)	Cormack Field House; Lexington, VA
February 7* no, no	at Fairleigh Dickinson	L 71–78	10–11	Hackensack, NJ
February 9 no, no	Chattanooga	L 55–59	10–12 (5–7)	Cormack Field House; Lexington, VA
February 11 no, no	Western Carolina	W 78–73	11–12 (6–7)	Cormack Field House; Lexington, VA
February 14 no, no	Appalachian State	L 49–55	11–13 (6–8)	Cormack Field House; Lexington, VA
February 16 no, no	at The Citadel	L 77–79	11–14 (6–9)	McAlister Field House; Charleston, SC
February 18 no, no	at Furman	L 75–107	11–15 (6–10)	Greenville Memorial Auditorium; Greenville, SC
1980 Southern Conference men's basketball tournament
February 23 no, no	vs. Furman	L 75–87	11–16	Roanoke Civic Center; Roanoke, VA
*Non-conference game. (#) Tournament seedings in parentheses. All times are in Eastern Time.

== 1980–81 ==
1980–81 VMI Keydets men's basketball
- Conference: Southern Conference
- Record: 4–23 (3–13 SoCon)
- Head coach: Charlie Schmaus
- Home arena: Cormack Field House

1980–81 Southern Conference men's basketball standings
	Conf.				Overall
Team	W		L	PCT	W		L	PCT
Chattanooga †	11	–	5	.688	21	–	9	.700
Davidson	11	–	5	.688	13	–	14	.481
Appalachian State	11	–	5	.688	20	–	9	.690
East Tennessee State	9	–	7	.563	13	–	14	.481
Western Carolina	9	–	7	.563	18	–	10	.643
Furman	8	–	8	.500	11	–	16	.407
Marshall	8	–	8	.500	18	–	10	.643
VMI	3	–	13	.188	4	–	23	.148
The Citadel	2	–	14	.125	9	–	17	.346
† 1981 Southern Conference Tournament winner Rankings from AP poll

Date time, TV	Opponent	Result	Record	Site city, state
November 28* no, no	at UCLA	L 61–99	0–1	Pauley Pavilion; Los Angeles, CA
November 29* no, no	at UC Irvine	L 96–125	0–2	Crawford Hall; Irvine, CA
December 3 no, no	Furman	L 82–87 ^{OT}	0–3 (0–1)	Cormack Field House; Lexington, VA
December 6 no, no	at Chattanooga	L 53–63	0–4 (0–2)	Maclellan Gymnasium; Chattanooga, TN
December 9* no, no	Navy	L 61–71	0–5	Cormack Field House; Lexington, VA
December 12* no, no	at Louisiana–Lafayette; Bayou Classic	L 52–80	0–6	Blackham Coliseum; Lafayette, LA
December 13* no, no	vs. Western Michigan; Bayou Classic	L 68–89	0–7	Blackham Coliseum; Lafayette, LA
January 3 no, no	Marshall	L 81–99	0–8 (0–3)	Cormack Field House; Lexington, VA
January 7 no, no	at East Tennessee State	W 43–42	1–8 (1–3)	Memorial Center; Johnson City, TN
January 10 no, no	at Furman	L 63–75	1–9 (1–4)	Greenville Memorial Auditorium; Greenville, SC
January 12 no, no	at The Citadel	W 58–49	2–9 (2–4)	McAlister Field House; Charleston, SC
January 14* no, no	at Baptist College	W 57–44	3–9	CSU Field House; North Charleston, SC
January 17 no, no	at Appalachian State	L 68–78	3–10 (2–5)	Varsity Gymnasium; Boone, NC
January 19 no, no	East Tennessee State	L 67–68	3–11 (2–6)	Cormack Field House; Lexington, VA
January 21 no, no	at Davidson	L 63–79	3–12 (2–7)	Johnston Gym; Davidson, NC
January 24* no, no	at Baltimore	L 41–46	3–13	Campus Recreation and Wellness; Baltimore, MD
January 26 no, no	Marshall	L 53–63	3–14 (2–8)	Cormack Field House; Lexington, VA
January 29* no, no	Richmond	L 73–79	3–15	Cormack Field House; Lexington, VA
January 31 no, no	Western Carolina	L 71–86	3–16 (2–9)	Cormack Field House; Lexington, VA
February 2 no, no	The Citadel	W 65–62	4–16 (3–9)	Cormack Field House; Lexington, VA
February 4* no, no	vs. William & Mary	L 63–75	4–17	Roanoke Civic Center; Roanoke, VA
February 7 no, no	at Western Carolina	L 75–91	4–18 (3–10)	Cullowhee, NC
February 9 no, no	Appalachian State	L 51–70	4–19 (3–11)	Cormack Field House; Lexington, VA
February 11 no, no	Davidson	L 82–95	4–20 (3–12)	Cormack Field House; Lexington, VA
February 16 no, no	Chattanooga	L 68–90	4–21 (3–13)	Cormack Field House; Lexington, VA
February 19* no, no	vs. Campbell	L 65–89	4–22	Raleigh, NC
1981 Southern Conference men's basketball tournament
February 28 no, no	vs. Chattanooga	L 63–89	4–23	Roanoke Civic Center; Roanoke, VA
*Non-conference game. (#) Tournament seedings in parentheses. All times are in Eastern Time.

== 1981–82 ==
This was the first year in which the Keydets played in newly built Cameron Hall, which replaced aging Cormack Field House. Cameron Hall, with a capacity of 5,029, continues to serve as VMI's home today.

1981–82 VMI Keydets men's basketball
- Conference: Southern Conference
- Record: 1–25 (1–15 SoCon)
- Head coach: Charlie Schmaus
- Home arena: Cameron Hall

1981–82 Southern Conference men's basketball standings
	Conf.				Overall
Team	W		L	PCT	W		L	PCT
Chattanooga †	15	–	1	.938	27	–	4	.871
Western Carolina	11	–	5	.688	19	–	8	.704
Davidson	9	–	7	.563	14	–	15	.483
East Tennessee State	8	–	8	.500	13	–	15	.464
Marshall	8	–	8	.500	16	–	11	.593
Furman	7	–	9	.438	11	–	16	.407
The Citadel	7	–	9	.438	14	–	14	.500
Appalachian State	6	–	10	.375	11	–	15	.423
VMI	1	–	15	.063	1	–	25	.038
† 1982 SoCon Tournament winner As of April 30, 1982; Rankings from AP poll

Date time, TV	Opponent	Result	Record	Site city, state
November 27* no, no	at Navy	L 37–63	0–1	Halsey Field House; Annapolis, MD
December 2* no, no	at William & Mary	L 57–84	0–2	William & Mary Hall; Williamsburg, VA
December 5* no, no	Virginia	L 49–76	0–3	Cameron Hall; Lexington, VA
December 8* no, no	James Madison	L 43–64	0–4	Cameron Hall; Lexington, VA
December 9* no, no	at Richmond	L 48–83	0–5	Robins Center; Richmond, VA
January 4 no, no	at Marshall	L 63–90	0–6 (0–1)	Cam Henderson Center; Huntington, WV
January 6* no, no	at Maine	L 71–81	0–7	Memorial Gymnasium; Orono, ME
January 8* no, no	vs. Illinois State; Worcester Co. National Classic	L 56–74	0–8	Hart Center; Worcester, MA
January 9* no, no	vs. Manhattan; Worcester Co. National Classic	L 75–84	0–9	Hart Center; Worcester, MA
January 13* no, no	Old Dominion	L 51–88	0–10	Cameron Hall; Lexington, VA
January 16 no, no	Western Carolina	L 57–72	0–11 (0–2)	Cameron Hall; Lexington, VA
January 18 no, no	The Citadel	L 61–72	0–12 (0–3)	Cameron Hall; Lexington, VA
January 21 no, no	at Chattanooga	L 61–81	0–13 (0–4)	Maclellan Gymnasium; Chattanooga, TN
January 23 no, no	at Western Carolina	L 69–99	0–14 (0–5)	Cullowhee, NC
January 25 no, no	at Davidson	L 63–79	0–15 (0–6)	Johnston Gym; Davidson, NC
January 28 no, no	at East Tennessee State	L 68–92	0–16 (0–7)	Memorial Center; Johnson City, TN
January 30 no, no	Appalachian State	W 67–62 ^{OT}	1–16 (1–7)	Cameron Hall; Lexington, VA
February 1 no, no	at Davidson	L 63–79	1–17 (1–8)	Johnston Gym; Davidson, NC
February 4* no, no	at Virginia Tech	L 76–101	1–18	Cassell Coliseum; Blacksburg, VA
February 6 no, no	East Tennessee State	L 69–104	1–19 (1–9)	Cameron Hall; Lexington, VA
February 8 no, no	Chattanooga	L 50–80	1–20 (1–10)	Cameron Hall; Lexington, VA
February 11 no, no	Marshall	L 67–103	1–21 (1–11)	Cameron Hall; Lexington, VA
February 13 no, no	at Furman	L 80–102	1–22 (1–12)	Greenville Memorial Auditorium; Greenville, SC
February 15 no, no	at The Citadel	L 74–91	1–23 (1–13)	McAlister Field House; Charleston, SC
February 20 no, no	at Appalachian State	L 58–91	1–24 (1–14)	Varsity Gymnasium; Boone, NC
February 22 no, no	Furman	L 83–92	1–25 (1–15)	Cameron Hall; Lexington, VA
*Non-conference game. (#) Tournament seedings in parentheses. All times are in Eastern Time.

== 1982–83 ==
1982–83 VMI Keydets men's basketball
- Conference: Southern Conference
- Record: 2–25 (1–15 SoCon)
- Head coach: Marty Fletcher (1st season)
- Home arena: Cameron Hall

1982–83 Southern Conference men's basketball standings
	Conf.				Overall
Team	W		L	PCT	W		L	PCT
No. 15 Chattanooga †	15	–	1	.938	26	–	4	.867
Marshall	13	–	3	.813	20	–	8	.714
East Tennessee State	12	–	4	.750	22	–	9	.710
Western Carolina	9	–	7	.563	17	–	12	.586
Davidson	8	–	8	.500	13	–	15	.464
The Citadel	7	–	9	.438	12	–	16	.429
Furman	4	–	12	.250	9	–	20	.310
Appalachian State	3	–	13	.188	6	–	21	.222
VMI	1	–	15	.063	2	–	25	.074
† 1983 Southern tournament winner As of April 30, 1983; Rankings from AP poll

Date time, TV	Opponent	Result	Record	Site city, state
November 28* no, no	at James Madison	L 33–58	0–1	JMU Convocation Center; Harrisonburg, VA
November 30* no, no	Longwood	L 49–54	0–2	Cameron Hall; Lexington, VA
December 4* no, no	at Virginia	L 41–86	0–3	University Hall; Charlottesville, VA
December 7* no, no	at Old Dominion	L 45–71	0–4	ODU Fieldhouse; Norfolk, VA
December 11* no, no	North Carolina Wesleyan	L 47–58	0–5	Cameron Hall; Lexington, VA
December 13* no, no	Emory and Henry	W 75–70	1–5	Cameron Hall; Lexington, VA
January 3* no, no	at South Florida	L 76–93	1–6	USF Sun Dome; Tampa, FL
January 8 no, no	at Marshall	L 64–95	1–7 (0–1)	Cam Henderson Center; Huntington, WV
January 15 no, no	at Furman	L 58–87	1–8 (0–2)	Greenville Memorial Auditorium; Greenville, SC
January 17 no, no	at The Citadel	L 50–57	1–9 (0–3)	McAlister Field House; Charleston, SC
January 22 no, no	at Davidson	L 43–75	1–10 (0–4)	Johnston Gym; Davidson, NC
January 24 no, no	at Appalachian State	L 61–69	1–11 (0–5)	Varsity Gymnasium; Boone, NC
January 27* no, no	Navy	L 53–57	1–12	Cameron Hall; Lexington, VA
January 29 no, no	Chattanooga	L 68–82	1–13 (0–6)	Cameron Hall; Lexington, VA
January 31 no, no	Western Carolina	L 55–75	1–14 (0–7)	Cameron Hall; Lexington, VA
February 3* no, no	Richmond	L 69–75	1–15	Cameron Hall; Lexington, VA
February 5 no, no	at Western Carolina	L 50–64	1–16 (0–8)	Reid Gymnasium; Cullowhee, NC
February 7 no, no	Chattanooga	L 54–64	1–17 (0–9)	Cameron Hall; Lexington, VA
February 9 no, no	East Tennessee State	L 63–86	1–18 (0–10)	Cameron Hall; Lexington, VA
February 14 no, no	Appalachian State	L 61–65	1–19 (0–11)	Cameron Hall; Lexington, VA
February 16* no, no	William & Mary	L 65–83	1–20	Cameron Hall; Lexington, VA
February 19 no, no	at East Tennessee State	L 64–83	1–21 (0–12)	Memorial Center; Johnson City, TN
February 21 no, no	Marshall	L 91–110	1–22 (0–13)	Cameron Hall; Lexington, VA
February 23* no, no	Virginia Tech	L 54–72	1–23	Cameron Hall; Lexington, VA
February 26 no, no	The Citadel	W 65–63	2–23 (1–13)	Cameron Hall; Lexington, VA
February 28 no, no	Furman	L 64–65	2–24 (1–14)	Cameron Hall; Lexington, VA
March 3 no, no	Davidson	L 68–83	2–25 (1–15)	Cameron Hall; Lexington, VA
*Non-conference game. (#) Tournament seedings in parentheses. All times are in Eastern Time.

== 1983–84 ==
1983–84 VMI Keydets men's basketball
- Conference: Southern Conference
- Record: 8–19 (4–12 SoCon)
- Head coach: Marty Fletcher
- Home arena: Cameron Hall

1983–84 Southern Conference men's basketball standings
	Conf.				Overall
Team	W		L	PCT	W		L	PCT
Marshall†	13	–	3	.813	25	–	6	.806
Chattanooga	12	–	4	.750	24	–	7	.774
Western Carolina	9	–	7	.563	15	–	13	.536
Appalachian State	8	–	8	.500	13	–	16	.448
The Citadel	8	–	8	.500	14	–	14	.500
Furman	7	–	9	.438	12	–	17	.414
East Tennessee State	6	–	10	.375	9	–	19	.321
Davidson	5	–	11	.313	9	–	19	.321
VMI	4	–	12	.250	8	–	19	.296
† Tournament winner As of April 30, 1984; Rankings from AP poll

Date time, TV	Opponent	Result	Record	Site city, state
November 28* no, no	Emory and Henry	W 75–48	1–0	Cameron Hall; Lexington, VA
November 30* no, no	at Navy	L 57–73	1–1	Halsey Field House; Annapolis, MD
December 3* no, no	Radford	L 64–75	1–2	Cameron Hall; Lexington, VA
December 5* no, no	Bridgewater	W 83–73	2–2	Cameron Hall; Lexington, VA
December 7* no, no	Averett	W 75–58	3–2	Cameron Hall; Lexington, VA
December 10* no, no	Old Dominion	L 65–82	3–3	Cameron Hall; Lexington, VA
December 17* no, no	at Virginia Tech	L 61–122	3–4	Cassell Coliseum; Blacksburg, VA
January 4 no, no	at Chattanooga	L 38–55	3–5 (0–1)	McKenzie Arena; Chattanooga, TN
January 7 no, no	at East Tennessee State	W 62–56	4–5 (1–1)	Memorial Center; Johnson City, TN
January 9* no, no	at Richmond	L 58–61	4–6	Robins Center; Richmond, VA
January 11 no, no	at Marshall	L 53–79	4–7 (1–2)	Cam Henderson Center; Huntington, WV
January 14 no, no	at Appalachian State	L 54–74	4–8 (1–3)	Varsity Gymnasium; Boone, NC
January 16 no, no	Chattanooga	L 49–56	4–9 (1–4)	Cameron Hall; Lexington, VA
January 18* no, no	at William & Mary	L 55–73	4–10	William & Mary Hall; Williamsburg, VA
January 21* no, no	at Bucknell	L 49–66	4–11	Davis Gym; Lewisburg, PA
January 23 no, no	East Tennessee State	L 55–56	4–12 (1–5)	Cameron Hall; Lexington, VA
January 28 no, no	at Davidson	L 55–62	4–13 (1–6)	Johnston Gym; Davidson, NC
January 30 no, no	Western Carolina	W 68–65 ^{OT}	5–13 (2–6)	Cameron Hall; Lexington, VA
February 4 no, no	at Western Carolina	L 82–86	5–14 (2–7)	Cullowhee, NC
February 6 no, no	at Furman	L 58–70	5–15 (2–8)	Greenville Memorial Auditorium; Greenville, SC
February 8 no, no	at The Citadel	L 61–65	5–16 (2–9)	McAlister Field House; Charleston, SC
February 11 no, no	Appalachian State	W 67–58	6–16 (3–9)	Cameron Hall; Lexington, VA
February 13 no, no	Davidson	L 44–47	6–17 (3–10)	Cameron Hall; Lexington, VA
February 16 no, no	Marshall	L 61–99	6–18 (3–11)	Cameron Hall; Lexington, VA
February 20 no, no	The Citadel	W 64–62	7–18 (4–11)	Cameron Hall; Lexington, VA
February 22* no, no	James Madison	W 62–60 ^{OT}	8–18	Cameron Hall; Lexington, VA
February 27 no, no	Furman	L 65–81	8–19 (4–12)	Cameron Hall; Lexington, VA
*Non-conference game. (#) Tournament seedings in parentheses. All times are in Eastern Time.

== 1984–85 ==
1984–85 VMI Keydets men's basketball
- Conference: Southern Conference
- Record: 16–14 (7–9 SoCon)
- Head coach: Marty Fletcher
- Home arena: Cameron Hall

1984–85 Southern Conference men's basketball standings
	Conf.				Overall
Team	W		L	PCT	W		L	PCT
Chattanooga	14	–	2	.875	24	–	8	.750
Marshall†	12	–	4	.750	21	–	13	.618
The Citadel	11	–	5	.688	18	–	11	.621
Western Carolina	8	–	8	.500	14	–	14	.500
VMI	7	–	9	.438	16	–	14	.533
Appalachian State	7	–	9	.438	14	–	14	.500
Davidson	6	–	10	.375	10	–	20	.333
Furman	4	–	12	.250	7	–	21	.250
East Tennessee State	3	–	13	.188	9	–	18	.333
† Tournament winner As of April 30, 1985; Rankings from AP poll

Date time, TV	Opponent	Result	Record	Site city, state
November 25* no, no	at James Madison	L 64–67 ^{OT}	0–1	JMU Convocation Center; Harrisonburg, VA
November 26* no, no	Bridgewater	W 86–46	1–1	Cameron Hall; Lexington, VA
November 28* no, no	at Old Dominion	L 50–56	1–2	ODU Fieldhouse; Norfolk, VA
December 1* no, no	Lynchburg	W 76–60	2–2	Cameron Hall; Lexington, VA
December 3* no, no	Virginia	L 57–68	2–3	Cameron Hall; Lexington, VA
December 6* no, no	Radford	W 53–51	3–3	Cameron Hall; Lexington, VA
December 8* no, no	Hampden–Sydney	W 80–55	4–3	Cameron Hall; Lexington, VA
January 5 no, no	at Marshall	W 58–54	5–3 (1–0)	Cam Henderson Center; Huntington, WV
January 14 no, no	Chattanooga	L 60–78	5–4 (1–1)	Cameron Hall; Lexington, VA
January 17 no, no	at Appalachian State	W 52–47	6–4 (2–1)	Varsity Gymnasium; Boone, NC
January 19 no, no	Western Carolina	W 60–57	7–4 (3–1)	Cameron Hall; Lexington, VA
January 21 no, no	Davidson	W 57–51	8–4 (4–1)	Cameron Hall; Lexington, VA
January 24 no, no	Furman	W 71–62	9–4 (5–1)	Cameron Hall; Lexington, VA
January 26 no, no	at Chattanooga	L 54–70	9–5 (5–2)	McKenzie Arena; Chattanooga, TN
January 28 no, no	Marshall	L 63–65	9–6 (5–3)	Cameron Hall; Lexington, VA
January 30* no, no	Bluefield	W 81–61	10–6	Cameron Hall; Lexington, VA
February 2* no, no	Bucknell	L 60–63	10–7	Cameron Hall; Lexington, VA
February 4 no, no	East Tennessee State	W 60–53	11–7 (6–3)	Cameron Hall; Lexington, VA
February 6* no, no	William & Mary	W 50–48	12–7	Cameron Hall; Lexington, VA
February 9 no, no	Appalachian State	W 64–56	13–7 (7–3)	Cameron Hall; Lexington, VA
February 12 no, no	at The Citadel	L 61–64 ^{OT}	13–8 (7–4)	McAlister Field House; Charleston, SC
February 14 no, no	at Furman	L 58–63	13–9 (7–5)	Greenville Memorial Auditorium; Greenville, SC
February 18 no, no	at Western Carolina	L 54–61	13–10 (7–6)	Cullowhee, NC
February 21 no, no	at Davidson	L 63–71	13–11 (7–7)	Johnston Gym; Davidson, NC
February 23 no, no	at East Tennessee State	L 70–71 ^{OT}	13–12 (7–8)	Memorial Center; Johnson City, TN
February 25 no, no	The Citadel	L 53–69	13–13 (7–9)	Cameron Hall; Lexington, VA
February 27* no, no	Richmond	W 48–47	14–13	Cameron Hall; Lexington, VA
1985 Southern Conference men's basketball tournament
March 1 no, no	vs. Western Carolina	W 65–63 ^{OT}	15–13	Asheville Civic Center; Asheville, NC
March 2 no, no	vs. Chattanooga	W 71–69 ^{OT}	16–13	Asheville Civic Center; Asheville, NC
March 3 no, no	vs. Marshall	L 65–70	16–14	Asheville Civic Center; Asheville, NC
*Non-conference game. (#) Tournament seedings in parentheses. All times are in Eastern Time.

== 1985–86 ==
1985–86 VMI Keydets men's basketball
- Conference: Southern Conference
- Record: 11–17 (5–11 SoCon)
- Head coach: Marty Fletcher
- Home arena: Cameron Hall

1985–86 Southern Conference men's basketball standings
	Conf.				Overall
Team	W		L	PCT	W		L	PCT
Chattanooga	12	–	4	.750	21	–	10	.677
Davidson†	10	–	6	.625	20	–	11	.645
Marshall	10	–	6	.625	19	–	11	.633
Appalachian State	9	–	7	.563	17	–	12	.586
Western Carolina	8	–	8	.500	14	–	14	.500
East Tennessee State	8	–	8	.500	13	–	16	.448
VMI	5	–	11	.313	11	–	17	.393
The Citadel	5	–	11	.313	10	–	18	.357
Furman	5	–	11	.313	10	–	17	.370
† Tournament winner As of April 30, 1986; Rankings from AP poll

Date time, TV	Opponent	Result	Record	Site city, state
November 23* no, no	Christopher Newport	W 63–52	1–0	Cameron Hall; Lexington, VA
November 25* no, no	Averett	W 106–67	2–0	Cameron Hall; Lexington, VA
November 26* no, no	Radford	W 69–59	3–0	Cameron Hall; Lexington, VA
December 2* no, no	James Madison	W 91–88	4–0	Cameron Hall; Lexington, VA
December 4* no, no	at Virginia	L 58–101	4–1	University Hall; Charlottesville, VA
December 10* no, no	at Richmond	L 61–69	4–2	Robins Center; Richmond, VA
December 11* no, no	Lynchburg	W 76–72	5–2	Cameron Hall; Lexington, VA
December 30* no, no	vs. #13 Kentucky	L 55–93	5–3	Freedom Hall; Louisville, KY
January 9 no, no	at Appalachian State	W 63–56	6–3 (1–0)	Varsity Gymnasium; Boone, NC
January 11 no, no	at East Tennessee State	L 74–88	6–4 (1–1)	Memorial Center; Johnson City, TN
January 16 no, no	Marshall	L 82–84	6–5 (1–2)	Cameron Hall; Lexington, VA
January 18 no, no	Furman	W 71–64	7–5 (2–2)	Cameron Hall; Lexington, VA
January 20 no, no	The Citadel	W 66–64	8–5 (3–2)	Cameron Hall; Lexington, VA
January 22* no, no	at William & Mary	L 64–71	8–6	William & Mary Hall; Williamsburg, VA
January 25 no, no	Western Carolina	L 55–57	8–7 (3–3)	Cameron Hall; Lexington, VA
January 27 no, no	Chattanooga	L 70–72	8–8 (3–4)	Cameron Hall; Lexington, VA
January 30 no, no	at Marshall	L 77–85	8–9 (3–5)	Cam Henderson Center; Huntington, WV
February 1 no, no	at Davidson	L 68–75	8–10 (3–6)	Johnston Gym; Davidson, NC
February 3 no, no	East Tennessee State	L 74–77	8–11 (3–7)	Cameron Hall; Lexington, VA
February 8 no, no	at The Citadel	W 83–76	9–11 (4–7)	McAlister Field House; Charleston, SC
February 10 no, no	at Furman	L 70–72 ^{OT}	9–12 (4–8)	Greenville Memorial Auditorium; Greenville, SC
February 12* no, no	Bluefield	W 70–68	10–12	Cameron Hall; Lexington, VA
February 15 no, no	at Chattanooga	L 64–74	10–13 (4–9)	McKenzie Arena; Chattanooga, TN
February 17 no, no	at Western Carolina	L 96–99 ^{OT}	10–14 (4–10)	Cullowhee, NC
February 19* no, no	#18 Virginia Tech	L 73–88	10–15	Cameron Hall; Lexington, VA
February 22 no, no	Appalachian State	L 67–69	10–16 (4–11)	Cameron Hall; Lexington, VA
February 24 no, no	Davidson	W 76–70	11–16 (5–11)	Cameron Hall; Lexington, VA
1986 Southern Conference men's basketball tournament
February 28 no, no	vs. Davidson	L 62–71	11–17	Asheville Civic Center; Asheville, NC
*Non-conference game. (#) Tournament seedings in parentheses. All times are in Eastern Time.

== 1986–87 ==
1986–87 VMI Keydets men's basketball
- Conference: Southern Conference
- Record: 11–17 (5–11 SoCon)
- Head coach: Joe Cantafio
- Home arena: Cameron Hall

1986–87 Southern Conference men's basketball standings
	Conf.				Overall
Team	W		L	PCT	W		L	PCT
Marshall †	15	–	1	.938	25	–	6	.806
Chattanooga	14	–	2	.875	21	–	8	.724
Davidson	12	–	4	.750	20	–	10	.667
Furman	10	–	6	.625	17	–	12	.586
The Citadel	6	–	10	.375	13	–	15	.464
VMI	5	–	11	.313	11	–	17	.393
Western Carolina	4	–	12	.250	10	–	19	.345
Appalachian State	3	–	13	.188	7	–	21	.250
East Tennessee State	3	–	13	.188	7	–	21	.250
† 1987 Southern Conference tournament winner As of April 30, 1987; Rankings from AP poll

Date time, TV	Opponent	Result	Record	Site city, state
November 30* no, no	Shenandoah	W 80–64	1–0	Cameron Hall; Lexington, VA
December 1* no, no	at James Madison	L 68–74	1–1	JMU Convocation Center; Harrisonburg, VA
December 3* no, no	at Virginia	L 69–81	1–2	University Hall; Charlottesville, VA
December 6* no, no	Richmond	W 68–57	2–2	Cameron Hall; Lexington, VA
December 8* no, no	Elon	W 77–72	3–2	Cameron Hall; Lexington, VA
December 10* no, no	at Radford	L 51–56	3–3	Dedmon Center; Radford, VA
December 11* no, no	Roanoke	W 70–59	4–3	Cameron Hall; Lexington, VA
December 22* no, no	at Tennessee	L 60–99	4–4	Stokely Athletic Center; Knoxville, TN
January 7* no, no	at Virginia Tech	L 68–99	4–5	Cassell Coliseum; Blacksburg, VA
January 10 no, no	at East Tennessee State	L 66–68	4–6 (0–1)	Memorial Center; Johnson City, TN
January 12 no, no	Appalachian State	W 68–64	5–6 (1–1)	Cameron Hall; Lexington, VA
January 15 no, no	Marshall	L 71–83	5–7 (1–2)	Cameron Hall; Lexington, VA
January 17 no, no	at Furman	L 71–90	5–8 (1–3)	Greenville Memorial Auditorium; Greenville, SC
January 19 no, no	at The Citadel	L 78–82 ^{OT}	5–9 (1–4)	McAlister Field House; Charleston, SC
January 21* no, no	Bluefield	W 113–83	6–9	Cameron Hall; Lexington, VA
January 24 no, no	at Western Carolina	W 65–56	7–9 (2–4)	Ramsey Center; Cullowhee, NC
January 26 no, no	at Chattanooga	L 63–75	7–10 (2–5)	McKenzie Arena; Chattanooga, TN
January 29 no, no	at Marshall	L 77–104	7–11 (2–6)	Cam Henderson Center; Huntington, WV
January 31 no, no	Davidson	L 65–90	7–12 (2–7)	Cameron Hall; Lexington, VA
February 7 no, no	The Citadel	W 68–62	8–12 (3–7)	Cameron Hall; Lexington, VA
February 9 no, no	Furman	L 78–84 ^{OT}	8–13 (3–8)	Cameron Hall; Lexington, VA
February 11* no, no	William & Mary	W 76–68	9–13	Cameron Hall; Lexington, VA
February 14 no, no	Chattanooga	L 60–75	9–14 (3–9)	Cameron Hall; Lexington, VA
February 16 no, no	Western Carolina	L 62–64	9–15 (3–10)	Cameron Hall; Lexington, VA
February 19 no, no	East Tennessee State	W 81–65	10–15 (4–10)	Cameron Hall; Lexington, VA
February 21 no, no	at Appalachian State	W 86–84	11–15 (5–10)	Varsity Gymnasium; Boone, NC
February 23 no, no	at Davidson	L 69–72	11–16 (5–11)	Johnston Gym; Davidson, NC
1987 Southern Conference men's basketball tournament
February 27 no, no	vs. Davidson	L 63–92	11–17	Asheville Civic Center; Asheville, NC
*Non-conference game. (#) Tournament seedings in parentheses. All times are in Eastern Time.

== 1987–88 ==
1987–88 VMI Keydets men's basketball
- Conference: Southern Conference
- Record: 13–17 (6–10 SoCon)
- Head coach: Joe Cantafio
- Home arena: Cameron Hall

1987–88 Southern Conference men's basketball standings
	Conf.				Overall
Team	W		L	PCT	W		L	PCT
Marshall	14	–	2	.875	24	–	8	.750
Furman	11	–	5	.688	18	–	10	.643
Davidson	9	–	7	.563	15	–	13	.536
East Tennessee State	9	–	7	.563	14	–	15	.483
Chattanooga †	8	–	8	.500	20	–	13	.606
Appalachian State	8	–	8	.500	16	–	13	.552
VMI	6	–	10	.375	13	–	17	.433
The Citadel	5	–	11	.313	8	–	20	.286
Western Carolina	2	–	14	.125	8	–	19	.296
† 1988 SoCon Tournament winner Rankings from AP poll

Date time, TV	Opponent	Result	Record	Site city, state
November 30* no, no	Bridgewater	W 78–77 ^{OT}	1–0	Cameron Hall; Lexington, VA
December 2* no, no	Radford	L 68–88	1–1	Cameron Hall; Lexington, VA
December 5* no, no	at #17 Georgetown	L 45–81	1–2	Capital Centre; Washington, D.C.
December 9* no, no	Roanoke	L 50–51	1–3	Cameron Hall; Lexington, VA
December 12* no, no	Shenandoah	W 71–55	2–3	Cameron Hall; Lexington, VA
December 28* no, no	at Texas	L 76–85	2–4	Frank Erwin Center; Austin, TX
January 2* no, no	at Oral Roberts	W 84–78	3–4	Mabee Center; Tulsa, OK
January 6* no, no	at Richmond	L 55–88	3–5	Robins Center; Richmond, VA
January 11* no, no	at William & Mary	L 59–69	3–6	William & Mary Hall; Williamsburg, VA
January 13 no, no	Davidson	L 64–66	3–7 (0–1)	Cameron Hall; Lexington, VA
January 16 no, no	at East Tennessee State	L 65–86	3–8 (0–2)	Memorial Center; Johnson City, TN
January 18 no, no	at Appalachian State	L 82–98	3–9 (0–3)	Varsity Gymnasium; Boone, NC
January 21 no, no	Marshall	L 62–64	3–10 (0–4)	Cameron Hall; Lexington, VA
January 23 no, no	Furman	W 69–60	4–10 (1–4)	Cameron Hall; Lexington, VA
January 25 no, no	The Citadel	W 77–63	5–10 (2–4)	Cameron Hall; Lexington, VA
January 27* no, no	Bluefield	W 94–80	6–10	Cameron Hall; Lexington, VA
January 30 no, no	Western Carolina	L 79–80	7–10 (2–5)	Cameron Hall; Lexington, VA
February 1 no, no	Chattanooga	W 68–61	7–10 (3–5)	Cameron Hall; Lexington, VA
February 4 no, no	at Marshall	L 91–95 ^{OT}	7–11 (3–6)	Cam Henderson Center; Huntington, WV
February 4 no, no	at Davidson	W 59–55	8–11 (4–6)	Johnston Gym; Davidson, NC
February 8 no, no	East Tennessee State	L 61–77	8–12 (4–7)	Cameron Hall; Lexington, VA
February 11* no, no	James Madison	W 71–66	9–12	Cameron Hall; Lexington, VA
February 13 no, no	at The Citadel	L 59–64	9–13 (4–8)	John Kresse Arena; Charleston, SC
February 15 no, no	at Furman	L 64–82	9–14 (4–9)	Greenville Memorial Auditorium; Greenville, SC
February 20 no, no	Appalachian State	W 66–65	10–14 (5–9)	Cameron Hall; Lexington, VA
February 27 no, no	at Chattanooga	L 70–77	10–15 (5–10)	McKenzie Arena; Chattanooga, TN
February 29 no, no	at Western Carolina	W 75–69	11–16 (6–10)	Ramsey Center; Cullowhee, NC
1988 Southern Conference men's basketball tournament
March 4 no, no	vs. Furman	W 78–73	12–16	Asheville Civic Center; Asheville, NC
March 5 no, no	vs. East Tennessee State	W 79–60	13–16	Asheville Civic Center; Asheville, NC
March 6 no, no	vs. Chattanooga	L 61–75	13–17	Asheville Civic Center; Asheville, NC
*Non-conference game. (#) Tournament seedings in parentheses. All times are in Eastern Time.

== 1988–89 ==
1988–89 VMI Keydets men's basketball
- Conference: Southern Conference
- Record: 11–17 (5–9 SoCon)
- Head coach: Joe Cantafio
- Home arena: Cameron Hall

1988–89 Southern Conference men's basketball standings
	Conf.				Overall
Team	W		L	PCT	W		L	PCT
Chattanooga	10	–	4	.714	18	–	12	.600
Furman	9	–	5	.643	17	–	12	.586
Appalachian State	8	–	6	.571	20	–	8	.714
East Tennessee State †	7	–	7	.500	20	–	11	.645
The Citadel	7	–	7	.500	16	–	12	.571
Marshall	6	–	8	.429	15	–	15	.500
VMI	5	–	9	.357	11	–	17	.393
Western Carolina	4	–	10	.286	12	–	16	.429
† 1989 SoCon Tournament winner As of April 30, 1988; Rankings from AP poll

Date time, TV	Opponent	Result	Record	Site city, state
November 28 no, no	at James Madison	L 92–94	0–1	JMU Convocation Center; Harrisonburg, VA
December 1* no, no	Shenandoah	W 78–58	1–1	Cameron Hall; Lexington, VA
December 5* no, no	at #20 Tennessee	L 82–84 ^{2OT}	1–2	Thompson–Boling Arena; Knoxville, TN
December 8* no, no	Eastern Mennonite	W 96–50	2–2	Cameron Hall; Lexington, VA
December 10* no, no	UNC Greensboro	W 76–55	3–2	Cameron Hall; Lexington, VA
December 30* no, no	at #18 North Carolina State	L 79–105	3–3	Reynolds Coliseum; Raleigh, NC
January 7* no, no	at UNC Asheville	L 70–74	3–4	Justice Center; Asheville, NC
January 9 no, no	at Marshall	W 63–61	4–4 (1–0)	Cam Henderson Center; Huntington, WV
January 14 no, no	at Western Carolina	L 71–75	4–5 (1–1)	Ramsey Center; Cullowhee, NC
January 16 no, no	at Chattanooga	L 76–80 ^{OT}	4–6 (1–2)	McKenzie Arena; Chattanooga, TN
January 19* no, no	vs. Virginia Tech	L 83–90 ^{OT}	4–7	Roanoke Civic Center; Roanoke, VA
January 21 no, no	Furman	W 91–82 ^{OT}	5–7 (2–2)	Cameron Hall; Lexington, VA
January 23 no, no	The Citadel	L 61–73	5–8 (2–3)	Cameron Hall; Lexington, VA
January 25* no, no	Bluefield	W 95–75	6–8	Cameron Hall; Lexington, VA
January 28 no, no	East Tennessee State	L 81–91	6–9 (2–4)	Cameron Hall; Lexington, VA
January 30 no, no	at Appalachian State	L 69–76	6–10 (2–5)	Varsity Gymnasium; Boone, NC
February 2* no, no	Richmond	L 79–87	6–11	Cameron Hall; Lexington, VA
February 4 no, no	Marshall	W 65–63	7–11 (3–5)	Cameron Hall; Lexington, VA
February 6* no, no	William & Mary	W 66–64	8–11	Cameron Hall; Lexington, VA
February 9* no, no	at Radford	W 76–66	9–11	Dedmon Center; Radford, VA
February 11 no, no	Chattanooga	W 68–66	10–11 (4–5)	Cameron Hall; Lexington, VA
February 13 no, no	Western Carolina	W 79–66	11–11 (5–5)	Cameron Hall; Lexington, VA
February 16* no, no	at Virginia	L 79–92	11–12	University Hall; Charlottesville, VA
February 18 no, no	at The Citadel	L 79–88	11–13 (5–6)	Deas Hall; Charleston, SC
February 20 no, no	at Furman	L 71–87	11–14 (5–7)	Greenville Memorial Auditorium; Greenville, SC
February 25 no, no	Appalachian State	L 60–67	11–15 (5–8)	Cameron Hall; Lexington, VA
February 27 no, no	at East Tennessee State	L 80–82	11–16 (5–9)	Memorial Center; Johnson City, TN
1989 Southern Conference men's basketball tournament
March 3 no, no	vs. Furman	L 73–81	11–17	Asheville Civic Center; Asheville, NC
*Non-conference game. (#) Tournament seedings in parentheses. All times are in Eastern Time.
