= 1981–82 Chattanooga Mocs basketball team =

American college basketball season

1981–82 Chattanooga Mocs basketball

SoCon regular season and tournament champions

NCAA tournament, Second round
- Conference: Southern Conference
- South
- Record: 27–4 (15–1 SoCon)
- Head coach: Murray Arnold (3rd season)
- Home arena: Maclellan Gymnasium

1981–82 Southern Conference men's basketball standings
	Conf.				Overall
Team	W		L	PCT	W		L	PCT
Chattanooga †	15	–	1	.938	27	–	4	.871
Western Carolina	11	–	5	.688	19	–	8	.704
Davidson	9	–	7	.563	14	–	15	.483
East Tennessee State	8	–	8	.500	13	–	15	.464
Marshall	8	–	8	.500	16	–	11	.593
Furman	7	–	9	.438	11	–	16	.407
The Citadel	7	–	9	.438	14	–	14	.500
Appalachian State	6	–	10	.375	11	–	15	.423
VMI	1	–	15	.063	1	–	25	.038
† 1982 SoCon Tournament winner As of April 30, 1982; Rankings from AP poll

The 1981–82 Chattanooga Mocs basketball team represented the University of Tennessee at Chattanooga as a member of the Southern Conference during the 1981–82 NCAA Division I men's basketball season. Their head coach was Murray Arnold and the team played their home games at Maclellan Gymnasium for the final season. The Mocs won the regular season and SoCon tournament titles, the latter earning the Mocs an automatic bid to the 1982 NCAA tournament. Participating in the tournament for the second consecutive season, Chattanooga knocked off No. 7 seed NC State in the first round before losing to No. 2 seed Minnesota, 52–51, in the round of 32.

== Roster ==
1981–82 Chattanooga Mocs men's basketball team
Players
Coaches

Pos.	#	Name	Height	Weight	Year	Previous school	Hometown
G	12	Chris McCray	6 ft 1 in (1.85 m)	170 lb (77 kg)	So	Escambia	Pensacola, Florida
G	15	Calvin Cochran	6 ft 4 in (1.93 m)	170 lb (77 kg)	Sr	Ooltewah	Ooltewah, Tennessee
G	20	Nick Morken	6 ft 2 in (1.88 m)	175 lb (79 kg)	Sr	Connersville	Connersville, Indiana
G	22	William Clark	6 ft 3 in (1.91 m)	195 lb (88 kg)	Jr	Evander Childs	Bronx, New York
G	24	Terence McGee	6 ft 3 in (1.91 m)	185 lb (84 kg)	Fr	Trezevant	Memphis, Tennessee
F	30	Joe Johnson	6 ft 6 in (1.98 m)	190 lb (86 kg)	Jr	Mission Church	Boston, Massachusetts
G	34	Elvis Mitchell	6 ft 3 in (1.91 m)	180 lb (82 kg)	Fr	Bolivar Central	Bolivar, Tennessee
C	40	Stanley Lawrence	6 ft 8 in (2.03 m)	215 lb (98 kg)	Jr	Jesup	Jesup, Georgia
G	41	Donel Cochran	6 ft 5 in (1.96 m)	180 lb (82 kg)	So	Ooltewah	Ooltewah, Tennessee
G	44	Willie White	6 ft 3 in (1.91 m)	195 lb (88 kg)	So	Carver	Memphis, Tennessee
F/C	52	Russ Schoene	6 ft 10 in (2.08 m)	210 lb (95 kg)	Sr	Wesclin	Trenton, Illinois
F	54	Stanford Strickland	6 ft 6 in (1.98 m)	200 lb (91 kg)	So	Howard	Chattanooga, Tennessee

Head coach

- Murray Arnold

Assistant coach(es)

Legend

- (C) Team captain
- (S) Suspended
- (I) Ineligible
- (W) Walk-on
- Injured
- Current redshirt

Roster

== Schedule and results ==
Date time, TV	Rank^{#}	Opponent^{#}	Result	Record	Site (attendance) city, state
Regular season
Nov 27, 1981*		vs. Middle Tennessee; Coors Classic	W 62–54	1–0	Gentry Complex; Nashville, Tennessee
Nov 28, 1981*		at Tennessee State; Coors Classic	W 85–57	2–0	Gentry Complex; Nashville, Tennessee
Dec 5, 1981*		at Mississippi State	L 57–69	2–1	Humphrey Coliseum; Starkville, Mississippi
Dec 11, 1981*		Tennessee Temple	W 85–68	3–1	Maclellan Gymnasium; Chattanooga, Tennessee
Dec 14, 1981		Appalachian State	W 52–42	4–1 (1–0)	Maclellan Gymnasium; Chattanooga, Tennessee
Dec 18, 1981*		Samford	W 88–46	5–1	Maclellan Gymnasium; Chattanooga, Tennessee
Dec 19, 1981*		Charleston Southern	W 88–70	6–1	Maclellan Gymnasium; Chattanooga, Tennessee
Dec 28, 1981*		at Tennessee–Martin	W 48–42	7–1	Skyhawk Arena; Martin, Tennessee
Dec 30, 1981*		at UAB	L 50–76	7–2	Birmingham-Jefferson Civic Center (5,318); Birmingham, Alabama
Jan 2, 1982*		Tennessee Wesleyan	W 92–52	8–2	Maclellan Gymnasium; Chattanooga, Tennessee
Jan 5, 1982		at Appalachian State	W 81–63	9–2 (2–0)	Varsity Gymnasium; Boone, North Carolina
Jan 9, 1982		The Citadel	W 79–72	10–2 (3–0)	Maclellan Gymnasium; Chattanooga, Tennessee
Jan 11, 1982		Davidson	W 71–55	11–2 (4–0)	Maclellan Gymnasium; Chattanooga, Tennessee
Jan 16, 1982		at East Tennessee State	W 78–73	12–2 (5–0)	Memorial Center; Johnson City, Tennessee
Jan 19, 1982		at Furman	W 89–72	13–2 (6–0)	Greenville Memorial Auditorium; Greenville, South Carolina
Jan 23, 1982		VMI	W 81–61	14–2 (7–0)	Maclellan Gymnasium; Chattanooga, Tennessee
Jan 25, 1982		at The Citadel	W 83–65	15–2 (8–0)	McAlister Field House; Charleston, South Carolina
Jan 27, 1982		Furman	W 74–58	16–2 (9–0)	Maclellan Gymnasium; Chattanooga, Tennessee
Jan 30, 1982		at Davidson	W 66–59	17–2 (10–0)	Johnston Gym; Davidson, North Carolina
Feb 2, 1982*		Alabama–Huntsville	W 54–47	18–2	Maclellan Gymnasium; Chattanooga, Tennessee
Feb 3, 1982		at Western Carolina	L 56–60	18–3 (10–1)	Reid Gymnasium; Cullowhee, North Carolina
Feb 6, 1982		at Marshall	W 83–68	19–3 (11–1)	Cam Henderson Center; Huntington, West Virginia
Feb 8, 1982		at VMI	W 80–50	20–3 (12–1)	Cameron Hall; Lexington, Virginia
Feb 13, 1982		Western Carolina	W 85–61	21–3 (13–1)	Maclellan Gymnasium; Chattanooga, Tennessee
Feb 15, 1982		East Tennessee State	W 71–60	22–3 (14–1)	Maclellan Gymnasium; Chattanooga, Tennessee
Feb 22, 1982		Marshall	W 100–82	23–3 (15–1)	Maclellan Gymnasium; Chattanooga, Tennessee
SoCon tournament
Feb 27, 1982*	(1)	(8) Appalachian State; Quarterfinals	W 62–53	24–3	Maclellan Gymnasium; Chattanooga, Tennessee
Mar 6, 1982*	(1)	vs. (4) East Tennessee State; Semifinals	W 70–65	25–3	Charleston Civic Center; Charleston, West Virginia
Mar 7, 1982*	(1)	vs. (3) Davidson; Championship game	W 69–58	26–3	Charleston Civic Center; Charleston, West Virginia
NCAA tournament
Mar 12, 1982*	(10 ME)	vs. (7 ME) NC State; First round	W 58–51	27–3	Market Square Arena; Indianapolis, Indiana
Mar 14, 1982*	(10 ME)	vs. (2 ME) No. 7 Minnesota; Second round	L 61–62	27–4	Market Square Arena; Indianapolis, Indiana
*Non-conference game. ^{#}Rankings from AP poll. (#) Tournament seedings in parentheses. ME=Mideast. All times are in Eastern Time.
