= 1982–83 Chattanooga Mocs basketball team =

American college basketball season

1982–83 Chattanooga Mocs basketball

SoCon regular season and tournament champions

NCAA tournament
- Conference: Southern Conference
- South

Ranking
- Coaches: No. 16
- AP: No. 15
- Record: 26–4 (15–1 SoCon)
- Head coach: Murray Arnold (4th season)
- Home arena: UTC Arena

1982–83 Southern Conference men's basketball standings
| | Conf. | | | | Overall |
| Team | W | | L | PCT | W | | L | PCT |
|---|---|---|---|---|---|---|---|---|
| No. 15 Chattanooga † | 15 | – | 1 | .938 | 26 | – | 4 | .867 |
| Marshall | 13 | – | 3 | .813 | 20 | – | 8 | .714 |
| East Tennessee State | 12 | – | 4 | .750 | 22 | – | 9 | .710 |
| Western Carolina | 9 | – | 7 | .563 | 17 | – | 12 | .586 |
| Davidson | 8 | – | 8 | .500 | 13 | – | 15 | .464 |
| The Citadel | 7 | – | 9 | .438 | 12 | – | 16 | .429 |
| Furman | 4 | – | 12 | .250 | 9 | – | 20 | .310 |
| Appalachian State | 3 | – | 13 | .188 | 6 | – | 21 | .222 |
| VMI | 1 | – | 15 | .063 | 2 | – | 25 | .074 |
† 1983 Southern tournament winner As of April 30, 1983; Rankings from AP poll

The 1982–83 Chattanooga Mocs basketball team represented the University of Tennessee at Chattanooga as a member of the Southern Conference during the 1982–83 NCAA Division I men's basketball season. Their head coach was Murray Arnold and the team played their home games at the newly opened UTC Arena. The Mocs won the regular season and SoCon tournament titles, the latter earning the Mocs an automatic bid to the 1983 NCAA tournament. Participating in the Big Dance for the third straight year, Chattanooga was beaten in the opening round by No. 8 seed Maryland, 52–51.

== Roster ==
1982–83 Chattanooga Mocs men's basketball team
Players
Coaches

| Pos. | # | Name | Height | Weight | Year | Previous school | Hometown |
|---|---|---|---|---|---|---|---|
| G | 12 | Chris McCray | 6 ft 1 in (1.85 m) | 170 lb (77 kg) | Jr | Escambia | Pensacola, Florida |
| G | 20 | Gerald Wilkins | 6 ft 6 in (1.98 m) | 185 lb (84 kg) | So | Benjamin Elijah Mays | Atlanta, Georgia |
| G | 22 | William Clark | 6 ft 3 in (1.91 m) | 195 lb (88 kg) | Sr | Evander Childs | Bronx, New York |
| G | 24 | Eric Brown | 6 ft 5 in (1.96 m) | 180 lb (82 kg) | Fr | Fairley | Memphis, Tennessee |
| F | 30 | Joe Johnson | 6 ft 6 in (1.98 m) | 210 lb (95 kg) | Sr | Mission Church | Boston, Massachusetts |
| F | 32 | Eddie Norris | 6 ft 6 in (1.98 m) | 195 lb (88 kg) | Fr | Tighlman | Paducah, Kentucky |
| F | 34 | Tim Ferguson | 6 ft 5 in (1.96 m) | 200 lb (91 kg) | Fr | Anderson | Cincinnati, Ohio |
| C | 40 | Stanley Lawrence | 6 ft 8 in (2.03 m) | 210 lb (95 kg) | Sr | Jesup | Jesup, Georgia |
| G | 41 | Donel Cochran | 6 ft 5 in (1.96 m) | 180 lb (82 kg) | Jr | Ooltewah | Ooltewah, Tennessee |
| F | 42 | Charlie Quinn | 6 ft 6 in (1.98 m) | 190 lb (86 kg) | Fr | | Memphis, Tennessee |
| G | 44 | Willie White | 6 ft 3 in (1.91 m) | 190 lb (86 kg) | Jr | Carver | Memphis, Tennessee |
| F | 45 | Lamar Oden | 6 ft 5 in (1.96 m) | 220 lb (100 kg) | Jr | | Sylacauga, Alabama |
| C | 50 | Mike Chatfield | 6 ft 9 in (2.06 m) | 180 lb (82 kg) | Fr | | Bloomington, Indiana |
| F | 54 | Stanford Strickland | 6 ft 6 in (1.98 m) | 205 lb (93 kg) | Jr | Howard | Chattanooga, Tennessee |

Head coach

- Murray Arnold

Assistant coach(es)

Legend

- (C) Team captain
- (S) Suspended
- (I) Ineligible
- (W) Walk-on
- Injured
- Current redshirt

Roster

== Schedule and results ==
| Date time, TV | Rank^{#} | Opponent^{#} | Result | Record | Site (attendance) city, state |
Regular season
| Nov 26, 1982* | | vs. Austin Peay; Tennessee Classic | W 72–69 | 1–0 | Murfreesboro, Tennessee |
| Nov 27, 1982* | | vs. Tennessee State; Tennessee Classic | W 68–51 | 2–0 | Murfreesboro, Tennessee |
| Dec 1, 1982* | | No. 14 Tennessee; First Game in UTC Arena | L 49–55 | 2–1 | UTC Arena; Chattanooga, Tennessee |
| Dec 4, 1982* | | Tennessee Wesleyan | W 94–47 | 3–1 | UTC Arena; Chattanooga, Tennessee |
| Dec 11, 1982* | | Columbus | W 79–64 | 4–1 | UTC Arena; Chattanooga, Tennessee |
| Dec 17, 1982* | | Navy; Krystal Classic | W 80–67 | 5–1 | UTC Arena; Chattanooga, Tennessee |
| Dec 18, 1982* | | Mississippi State; Krystal Classic | W 62–54 | 6–1 | UTC Arena; Chattanooga, Tennessee |
| Dec 21, 1982* | | North Carolina | L 66–73 | 6–2 | UTC Arena; Chattanooga, Tennessee |
| Jan 3, 1983* | | Tennessee–Martin | W 81–68 | 7–2 | UTC Arena; Chattanooga, Tennessee |
| Jan 8, 1983 | | at East Tennessee State | W 76–73 | 8–2 (1–0) | Memorial Center; Johnson City, Tennessee |
| Jan 13, 1983 | | Appalachian State | W 85–53 | 9–2 (2–0) | UTC Arena; Chattanooga, Tennessee |
| Jan 15, 1983 | | Davidson | W 71–63 | 10–2 (3–0) | UTC Arena; Chattanooga, Tennessee |
| Jan 19, 1983 | | at The Citadel | W 58–57 | 11–2 (4–0) | McAlister Field House; Charleston, South Carolina |
| Jan 24, 1983 | | East Tennessee State | W 78–66 | 12–2 (5–0) | UTC Arena; Chattanooga, Tennessee |
| Jan 27, 1983 | | at Marshall | L 67–73 | 12–3 (5–1) | Cam Henderson Center; Huntington, West Virginia |
| Jan 29, 1983 | | at VMI | W 82–68 | 13–3 (6–1) | Cameron Hall; Lexington, Virginia |
| Feb 2, 1983 | | at Appalachian State | W 50–48 | 14–3 (7–1) | Varsity Gymnasium; Boone, North Carolina |
| Feb 5, 1983 | | Marshall | W 88–71 | 15–3 (8–1) | UTC Arena; Chattanooga, Tennessee |
| Feb 7, 1983 | | VMI | W 64–54 | 16–3 (9–1) | UTC Arena; Chattanooga, Tennessee |
| Feb 12, 1983 | | Furman | W 82–56 | 17–3 (10–1) | UTC Arena; Chattanooga, Tennessee |
| Feb 14, 1983 | | The Citadel | W 85–68 | 18–3 (11–1) | UTC Arena; Chattanooga, Tennessee |
| Feb 19, 1983 | | at Davidson | W 73–71 | 19–3 (12–1) | Johnston Gym; Davidson, North Carolina |
| Feb 21, 1983 | | at Furman | W 52–51 | 20–3 (13–1) | Memorial Auditorium; Greenville, South Carolina |
| Feb 26, 1983 | | at Western Carolina | W 74–62 | 21–3 (14–1) | Reid Gymnasium; Cullowhee, North Carolina |
| Feb 28, 1983* | | Tennessee Temple | W 78–62 | 22–3 | UTC Arena; Chattanooga, Tennessee |
| Mar 5, 1983 | | Western Carolina | W 76–73 | 23–3 (15–1) | The McKenzie Arena; Chattanooga, Tennessee |
SoCon tournament
| Mar 10, 1983* | (1) No. 18 | vs. (8) Appalachian State; Quarterfinals | W 71–58 | 24–3 | Charleston Civic Center; Charleston, West Virginia |
| Mar 11, 1983* | (1) No. 18 | vs. (4) Western Carolina; Semifinals | W 77–75 ^{OT} | 25–3 | Charleston Civic Center; Charleston, West Virginia |
| Mar 12, 1983* | (1) No. 18 | vs. (3) East Tennessee State; Championship game | W 70–62 | 26–3 | Charleston Civic Center; Charleston, West Virginia |
NCAA tournament
| Mar 17, 1983* | (9 MW) No. 15 | vs. (8 MW) Maryland; First round | L 51–52 | 26–4 | The Summit; Houston, Texas |
*Non-conference game. ^{#}Rankings from AP poll. (#) Tournament seedings in parentheses. MW=Midwest. All times are in Eastern Time.
