= 1981 Southern Conference men's basketball tournament =

- Classification: Division I
- Season: 1980–81
- Teams: 8
- Site: Roanoke Civic Center; Roanoke, VA
- Champions: Chattanooga (1st title)
- Winning coach: Murray Arnold (1st title)

1980–81 Southern Conference men's basketball standings
	Conf.				Overall
Team	W		L	PCT	W		L	PCT
Chattanooga †	11	–	5	.688	21	–	9	.700
Davidson	11	–	5	.688	13	–	14	.481
Appalachian State	11	–	5	.688	20	–	9	.690
East Tennessee State	9	–	7	.563	13	–	14	.481
Western Carolina	9	–	7	.563	18	–	10	.643
Furman	8	–	8	.500	11	–	16	.407
Marshall	8	–	8	.500	18	–	10	.643
VMI	3	–	13	.188	4	–	23	.148
The Citadel	2	–	14	.125	9	–	17	.346
† 1981 Southern Conference Tournament winner Rankings from AP poll

The 1981 Southern Conference men's basketball tournament took place from February 28–March 7, 1981. The quarterfinal round was hosted at campus sites, while the semifinals and finals were hosted at the Roanoke Civic Center in Roanoke, Virginia. The Chattanooga Mocs, led by head coach Murray Arnold, won their first Southern Conference title and received the automatic berth to the 1981 NCAA tournament.

== Format ==
The top eight finishers of the conference's nine members were eligible for the tournament. Teams were seeded based on conference winning percentage. The tournament used a preset bracket consisting of three rounds.

== Bracket ==
Quarterfinals; February 28
1	Chattanooga	89
8	VMI	63
4	East Tennessee St.	80
5	Western Carolina	91
2	Davidson	77
7	Marshall	90
3	Appalachian State	75*
6	Furman	71

Semifinals; March 6
1	Chattanooga	79
5	Western Carolina	70
3	Appalachian State	77
7	Marshall	62

Finals; March 7
1	Chattanooga	59
3	Appalachian State	55

* Overtime game

== See also ==
- List of Southern Conference men's basketball champions
