= 1983 Southern Conference men's basketball tournament =

- Classification: Division I
- Season: 1982–83
- Teams: 8
- Site: Charleston Civic Center; Charleston, WV
- Champions: Chattanooga (3rd title)
- Winning coach: Murray Arnold (3rd title)

1982–83 Southern Conference men's basketball standings
	Conf.				Overall
Team	W		L	PCT	W		L	PCT
No. 15 Chattanooga †	15	–	1	.938	26	–	4	.867
Marshall	13	–	3	.813	20	–	8	.714
East Tennessee State	12	–	4	.750	22	–	9	.710
Western Carolina	9	–	7	.563	17	–	12	.586
Davidson	8	–	8	.500	13	–	15	.464
The Citadel	7	–	9	.438	12	–	16	.429
Furman	4	–	12	.250	9	–	20	.310
Appalachian State	3	–	13	.188	6	–	21	.222
VMI	1	–	15	.063	2	–	25	.074
† 1983 Southern tournament winner As of April 30, 1983; Rankings from AP poll

The 1983 Southern Conference men's basketball tournament took place from March 10–12, 1983 at the Charleston Civic Center in Charleston, West Virginia. The Chattanooga Mocs, led by head coach Murray Arnold, won their third Southern Conference title and received the automatic berth to the 1983 NCAA tournament.

== Format ==
The top eight finishers of the conference's nine members were eligible for the tournament. Teams were seeded based on conference winning percentage. The tournament used a preset bracket consisting of three rounds.

== Bracket ==
Quarterfinals; March 10
1	#18 Chattanooga	71
8	Appalachian State	58
4	Western Carolina	86
5	Davidson	62
2	Marshall	60
7	Furman	67
3	East Tennessee State	75
6	The Citadel	65

Semifinals; March 11
1	#18 Chattanooga	77
4	Western Carolina	75^{OT}
3	East Tennessee State	81
7	Furman	68

Finals; March 12
1	#18 Chattanooga	70
3	East Tennessee State	62

== See also ==
- List of Southern Conference men's basketball champions
