= 1982 Southern Conference men's basketball tournament =

- Classification: Division I
- Season: 1981–82
- Teams: 8
- Site: Charleston Civic Center; Charleston, WV
- Champions: Chattanooga (2nd title)
- Winning coach: Murray Arnold (2nd title)

1981–82 Southern Conference men's basketball standings
	Conf.				Overall
Team	W		L	PCT	W		L	PCT
Chattanooga †	15	–	1	.938	27	–	4	.871
Western Carolina	11	–	5	.688	19	–	8	.704
Davidson	9	–	7	.563	14	–	15	.483
East Tennessee State	8	–	8	.500	13	–	15	.464
Marshall	8	–	8	.500	16	–	11	.593
Furman	7	–	9	.438	11	–	16	.407
The Citadel	7	–	9	.438	14	–	14	.500
Appalachian State	6	–	10	.375	11	–	15	.423
VMI	1	–	15	.063	1	–	25	.038
† 1982 SoCon Tournament winner As of April 30, 1982; Rankings from AP poll

The 1982 Southern Conference men's basketball tournament took place from February 27–March 6, 1982. The quarterfinal round was hosted at campus sites, while the semifinals and finals were hosted at the Charleston Civic Center in Charleston, West Virginia. The Chattanooga Mocs, led by head coach Murray Arnold, won their second Southern Conference title and received the automatic berth to the 1982 NCAA tournament.

== Format ==
The top eight finishers of the conference's nine members were eligible for the tournament. Teams were seeded based on conference winning percentage. The tournament used a preset bracket consisting of three rounds.

== Bracket ==
Quarterfinals; February 27
1	Chattanooga	62
8	Appalachian State	53
4	East Tennessee State	110
5	Marshall	92
2	Western Carolina	62
7	The Citadel	66
3	Davidson	74
6	Furman	66

Semifinals; March 6
1	Chattanooga	70
4	East Tennessee State	65
7	The Citadel	54
3	Davidson	57

Finals; March 7
1	Chattanooga	69
3	Davidson	58

* Overtime game

== See also ==
- List of Southern Conference men's basketball champions
