= 1983–84 Marshall Thundering Herd men's basketball team =

American college basketball season

1983–84 Marshall Thundering Herd men's basketball

SoCon regular season champions SoCon tournament champions

NCAA tournament, First Round
- Conference: Southern Conference
- Record: 25–6 (13–3 SoCon)
- Head coach: Rick Huckabay (1st season)
- Assistant coaches: Dan Bell; Henry Dickerson; John Lyles
- Home arena: Cam Henderson Center

1983–84 Southern Conference men's basketball standings
| | Conf. | | | | Overall |
| Team | W | | L | PCT | W | | L | PCT |
|---|---|---|---|---|---|---|---|---|
| Marshall† | 13 | – | 3 | .813 | 25 | – | 6 | .806 |
| Chattanooga | 12 | – | 4 | .750 | 24 | – | 7 | .774 |
| Western Carolina | 9 | – | 7 | .563 | 15 | – | 13 | .536 |
| Appalachian State | 8 | – | 8 | .500 | 13 | – | 16 | .448 |
| The Citadel | 8 | – | 8 | .500 | 14 | – | 14 | .500 |
| Furman | 7 | – | 9 | .438 | 12 | – | 17 | .414 |
| East Tennessee State | 6 | – | 10 | .375 | 9 | – | 19 | .321 |
| Davidson | 5 | – | 11 | .313 | 9 | – | 19 | .321 |
| VMI | 4 | – | 12 | .250 | 8 | – | 19 | .296 |
† Tournament winner As of April 30, 1984; Rankings from AP poll

The 1983–84 Marshall Thundering Herd men's basketball team represented Marshall University during the 1983–84 NCAA Division I men's basketball season. The Thundering Herd, led by first-year head coach Rick Huckabay, played their home games at the Cam Henderson Center as members of the Southern Conference. They finished the season 25–6, 13–3 in SoCon play to finish in first place. They defeated Davidson, Appalachian State, and Chattanooga to become champions of the SoCon tournament. They received the SoCon's automatic bid to the NCAA tournament where, as a No. 10 seed, they lost to No. 7 seed Villanova in the opening round.

== Roster ==
1983–84 Marshall Thundering Herd men's basketball team
| Players | Coaches |
|---|---|
| Pos. / # / Name / Height / Weight / Year / Hometown; G / 32 / LaVerne Evans / 6 ft 4 in (1.93 m) / — / Sr | Head coach: Rick Huckabay (Louisiana Tech); Assistant coach(es): Dan Bell (Northwestern State); Henry Dickerson (Charleston (WV)); John Lyles (Louisiana College); Legend: (C) Team captain; (S) Suspended; (I) Ineligible; (W) Walk-on; Injured; Current redshirt |

== Schedule and results ==
| Date time, TV | Rank^{#} | Opponent^{#} | Result | Record | Site (attendance) city, state |
Regular season
| Nov 29, 1983* | | at Eastern Michigan | W 77–65 | 1–0 | Bowen Field House (2,150); Ypsilanti, MI |
| Dec 3, 1983* | | West Virginia rivalry | W 78–67 | 2–0 | Cam Henderson Center (10,573); Huntington, WV |
| Dec 9, 1983* | | New Hampshire; Marshall Memorial Invitational | W 99–72 | 3–0 | Cam Henderson Center (6,738); Huntington, WV |
| Dec 10, 1983* | | TCU; Marshall Memorial Invitational | W 90–67 | 4–0 | Cam Henderson Center (7,612); Huntington, WV |
| Dec 13, 1983* | | Ohio Wesleyan | W 112–83 | 5–0 | Cam Henderson Center (6,341); Huntington, WV |
| Dec 15, 1983* | | at Morehead State | L 78–81 | 5–1 | Ellis Johnson Arena (5,000); Morehead, KY |
| Dec 22, 1983* | | Cincinnati | W 77–50 | 6–1 | Cam Henderson Center (8,303); Huntington, WV |
| Dec 29, 1983* | | vs. No. 5 Georgetown; Rebel Classic | L 71–82 | 6–2 | Thomas & Mack Center (18,500); Paradise, NV |
| Dec 30, 1983* | | vs. Clemson; Rebel Classic | W 63–61 | 7–2 | Thomas & Mack Center (16,465); Paradise, NV |
| Jan 3, 1984* | | Charleston (WV) | W 92–59 | 8–2 | Cam Henderson Center (7,229); Huntington, WV |
| Jan 7, 1984 | | at Furman | W 93–74 | 9–2 (1–0) | Greenville Memorial Auditorium (2,898); Greenville, SC |
| Jan 9, 1984 | | at The Citadel | L 76–84 | 9–3 (1–1) | McAlister Field House (644); Charleston, SC |
| Jan 11, 1984 | | VMI | W 79–53 | 10–3 (2–1) | Cam Henderson Center (7,906); Huntington, WV |
| Jan 14, 1984 | | Chattanooga | W 91–89 | 11–3 (3–1) | Cam Henderson Center (9,842); Huntington, WV |
| Jan 16, 1984 | | Furman | W 80–61 | 12–3 (4–1) | Cam Henderson Center (7,758); Huntington, WV |
| Jan 21, 1984 | | East Tennessee State | W 100–82 | 13–3 (5–1) | Cam Henderson Center (9,340); Huntington, WV |
| Jan 23, 1984 | | at Appalachian State | L 83–84 ^{OT} | 13–4 (5–2) | Varsity Gymnasium (4,452); Boone, NC |
| Jan 28, 1984 | | Western Carolina | W 82–70 | 14–4 (6–2) | Cam Henderson Center (9,749); Huntington, WV |
| Feb 1, 1984* | | Marquette | W 68–67 | 15–4 | Cam Henderson Center (9,895); Huntington, WV |
| Feb 4, 1984 | | at Chattanooga | W 75–67 | 16–4 (7–2) | McKenzie Arena (10,491); Chattanooga, TN |
| Feb 6, 1984 | | at East Tennessee State | W 65–63 | 17–4 (8–2) | Memorial Center (3,417); Johnson City, TN |
| Feb 11, 1984 | | Davidson | W 80–69 | 18–4 (9–2) | Cam Henderson Center (10,484); Huntington, WV |
| Feb 14, 1984 | | Appalachian State | W 84–77 | 19–4 (10–2) | Cam Henderson Center (9,517); Huntington, WV |
| Feb 16, 1984 | | at VMI | W 99–61 | 20–4 (11–2) | Camron Hall (600); Lexington, VA |
| Feb 18, 1984 | | The Citadel | W 85–71 | 21–4 (12–2) | Cam Henderson Center (10,705); Huntington, WV |
| Feb 23, 1984 | | at Western Carolina | L 100–102 ^{OT} | 21–5 (12–3) | Reid Gymnasium (3,835); Cullowhee, NC |
| Feb 25, 1984 | | at Davidson | W 66–65 | 22–5 (13–3) | Johnston Gym (2,300); Davidson, NC |
SoCon tournament
| Mar 8, 1984 | (1) | vs. (8) Davidson; Quarterfinals | W 78–68 | 23–5 | Asheville Civic Center (4,210); Asheville, NC |
| Mar 9, 1984 | (1) | vs. (4) Appalachian State; Semifinals | W 97–67 | 24–5 | Asheville Civic Center (7,129); Asheville, NC |
| Mar 10, 1984 | (1) | vs. (2) Chattanooga; Championship | W 111–107 ^{2OT} | 25–5 | Asheville Civic Center (6,684); Asheville, NC |
NCAA tournament
| Mar 16, 1984* | (10 ME) | vs. (7 ME) Villanova; First round | L 72–84 | 25–6 | MECCA Arena (10,788); Milwaukee, WI |
*Non-conference game. ^{#}Rankings from AP poll. (#) Tournament seedings in parentheses. ME=Mideast.
