= 1980 Southern Conference men's basketball tournament =

- Classification: Division I
- Season: 1979–80
- Teams: 8
- Site: Roanoke Civic Center; Roanoke, VA
- Champions: Furman (6th title)
- Winning coach: Eddie Holbrook (1st title)

1979–80 Southern Conference men's basketball standings
	Conf.				Overall
Team	W		L	PCT	W		L	PCT
Furman †	14	–	1	.933	23	–	7	.767
Marshall	10	–	6	.625	17	–	12	.586
Western Carolina	9	–	7	.563	17	–	10	.630
East Tennessee State	8	–	7	.533	15	–	13	.536
Chattanooga	7	–	9	.438	13	–	14	.481
Appalachian State	6	–	10	.375	12	–	16	.429
The Citadel	6	–	10	.375	14	–	13	.519
VMI	6	–	10	.375	11	–	16	.407
Davidson	4	–	11	.267	8	–	18	.308
† 1980 Southern Conference Tournament winner Rankings from AP poll

The 1980 Southern Conference men's basketball tournament took place from February 23–March 1, 1980. The quarterfinal round was hosted at campus sites, while the semifinals and finals were hosted at the Roanoke Civic Center in Roanoke, Virginia. The Furman Paladins, led by head coach Eddie Holbrook, won their sixth Southern Conference title and received the automatic berth to the 1980 NCAA tournament.

== Format ==
The top eight finishers of the conference's nine members were eligible for the tournament. Teams were seeded based on conference winning percentage. The tournament used a preset bracket consisting of three rounds.

== Bracket ==
Quarterfinals; February 23
1	Furman	87
8	VMI	75
4	East Tennessee St.	71
5	Chattanooga	67
2	Marshall	100
7	The Citadel	66
3	Western Carolina	66
6	Appalachian State	67*

Semifinals; February 29
1	Furman	93
4	East Tennessee St.	81
2	Marshall	91
6	Appalachian State	76

Finals; March 1
1	Furman	80
2	Marshall	62

* Overtime game

== See also ==
- List of Southern Conference men's basketball champions
