= 1984 Southern Conference men's basketball tournament =

American collegiate postseason men's basketball tournament

- Classification: Division I
- Season: 1983–84
- Teams: 8
- Site: Asheville Civic Center; Asheville, NC
- Champions: Marshall (1st title)
- Winning coach: Rick Huckabay (1st title)

1983–84 Southern Conference men's basketball standings
	Conf.				Overall
Team	W		L	PCT	W		L	PCT
Marshall†	13	–	3	.813	25	–	6	.806
Chattanooga	12	–	4	.750	24	–	7	.774
Western Carolina	9	–	7	.563	15	–	13	.536
Appalachian State	8	–	8	.500	13	–	16	.448
The Citadel	8	–	8	.500	14	–	14	.500
Furman	7	–	9	.438	12	–	17	.414
East Tennessee State	6	–	10	.375	9	–	19	.321
Davidson	5	–	11	.313	9	–	19	.321
VMI	4	–	12	.250	8	–	19	.296
† Tournament winner As of April 30, 1984; Rankings from AP poll

The 1984 Southern Conference men's basketball tournament took place from March 2–4, 1984 at the Asheville Civic Center in Asheville, North Carolina. The Marshall Thundering Herd, led by head coach Rick Huckabay, won their first Southern Conference title and received the automatic berth to the 1984 NCAA tournament.

== Format ==
The top eight finishers of the conference's nine members were eligible for the tournament. Teams were seeded based on conference winning percentage. The tournament used a preset bracket consisting of three rounds.

== Bracket ==
Quarterfinals; March 2
1	Marshall	78
8	Davidson	68
4	Appalachian State	82
5	The Citadel	77
2	Chattanooga	82
7	East Tennessee State	50
3	Western Carolina	67
6	Furman	71

Semifinals; March 3
1	Marshall	97
4	Appalachian State	67
2	Chattanooga	70
6	Furman	57

Finals; March 4
1	Marshall	111
2	Chattanooga	107^{2OT}

== See also ==
- List of Southern Conference men's basketball champions
