= 1979–80 Furman Paladins men's basketball team =

1979–80 Furman Paladins men's basketball

SoCon regular season and tournament champion

NCAA tournament, First round
- Conference: Southern Conference
- Record: 23–7 (14–1 SoCon)
- Head coach: Eddie Holbrook (2nd season)
- Home arena: Greenville Memorial Auditorium

1979–80 Southern Conference men's basketball standings
	Conf.				Overall
Team	W		L	PCT	W		L	PCT
Furman †	14	–	1	.933	23	–	7	.767
Marshall	10	–	6	.625	17	–	12	.586
Western Carolina	9	–	7	.563	17	–	10	.630
East Tennessee State	8	–	7	.533	15	–	13	.536
Chattanooga	7	–	9	.438	13	–	14	.481
Appalachian State	6	–	10	.375	12	–	16	.429
The Citadel	6	–	10	.375	14	–	13	.519
VMI	6	–	10	.375	11	–	16	.407
Davidson	4	–	11	.267	8	–	18	.308
† 1980 Southern Conference Tournament winner Rankings from AP poll

The 1979–80 Furman Paladins men's basketball team represented Furman University in the 1979–80 NCAA Division I men's basketball season. The Paladins, led by second-year head coach Eddie Holbrook, played their home games at Greenville Memorial Auditorium in Greenville, South Carolina, as members of the Southern Conference. They finished the regular season with a 14–1 record in SoCon play, to finish in first place. In the SoCon tournament, they defeated VMI, and East Tennessee State, and Marshall to win the title and make the NCAA tournament. In the opening round, the Paladins were beaten by No. 7 seed Tennessee to finish the season at 23–7.

The Furman men's basketball program would not make a return to the NCAA tournament until 2023.

== Roster ==
1979–80 Furman Paladins men's basketball team
Players	Coaches
Pos. / # / Name / Height / Weight / Year / Hometown; PF / 25 / Jonathan Moore / 6 ft 8 in (2.03 m) / 205 lb (93 kg) / Sr / Charleston, South Carolina	Head coach: Eddie Holbrook; Assistant coach(es) Legend: (C) Team captain; (S) Suspended; (I) Ineligible; (W) Walk-on; Injured; Current redshirt; Roster

== Schedule and results ==
Date time, TV	Rank^{#}	Opponent^{#}	Result	Record	Site (attendance) city, state
Regular season
Dec 1, 1979*		Central Florida	L 77–84	0–1	Memorial Auditorium; Greenville, South Carolina
Dec 3, 1979*		Rollins	W 88–73	1–1	Memorial Auditorium; Greenville, South Carolina
Dec 5, 1979*		Coastal Carolina	W 89–65	2–1	Memorial Auditorium; Greenville, South Carolina
Dec 8, 1979		at The Citadel	W 89–88	3–1 (1–0)	McAlister Field House; Charleston, South Carolina
Dec 15, 1979		at Davidson	W 91–81	4–1 (2–0)	Charlotte Coliseum; Charlotte, North Carolina
Dec 17, 1979		Western Carolina	W 96–90	5–1 (3–0)	Memorial Auditorium; Greenville, South Carolina
Dec 20, 1979*		at UNC Charlotte	L 76–91	5–2	Charlotte Coliseum; Charlotte, North Carolina
Dec 28, 1979*		Indiana State–Evansville; Poinsettia Classic	W 93–64	6–2	Memorial Auditorium; Greenville, South Carolina
Dec 29, 1979*		Austin Peay; Poinsettia Classic	W 93–89	7–2	Memorial Auditorium; Greenville, South Carolina
Jan 3, 1980*		Presbyterian	W 90–61	8–2	Memorial Auditorium; Greenville, South Carolina
Jan 5, 1980		Appalachian State	W 76–65	9–2 (4–0)	Memorial Auditorium; Greenville, South Carolina
Jan 7, 1980		at Western Carolina	W 92–83	10–2 (5–0)	Reid Gymnasium; Cullowhee, North Carolina
Jan 10, 1980		Chattanooga	W 88–74	11–2 (6–0)	Memorial Auditorium; Greenville, South Carolina
Jan 12, 1980		Davidson	W 84–68	12–2 (7–0)	Memorial Auditorium; Greenville, South Carolina
Jan 16, 1980		at East Tennessee State	W 86–84 ^{OT}	13–2 (8–0)	Memorial Center; Johnson City, Tennessee
Jan 19, 1980		The Citadel	W 82–55	14–2 (9–0)	Memorial Auditorium; Greenville, South Carolina
Jan 21, 1980		at Appalachian State	W 75–71	15–2 (10–0)	Varsity Gym; Boone, North Carolina
Jan 23, 1980*		at No. 12 Clemson	L 67–85	15–3	Littlejohn Coliseum; Clemson, South Carolina
Jan 26, 1980		at VMI	W 84–67	16–3 (11–0)	VMI Field House; Lexington, Virginia
Jan 28, 1980		at Marshall	L 67–83	16–4 (11–1)	Memorial Field House; Huntington, West Virginia
Feb 1, 1980*		at NC State; North-South Doubleheader	L 56–76	16–5	Charlotte Coliseum; Charlotte, North Carolina
Feb 2, 1980*		No. 11 North Carolina; North-South Doubleheader	L 63–75	16–6	Charlotte Coliseum; Charlotte, North Carolina
Feb 13, 1980		at Chattanooga	W 67–65	17–6 (12–1)	Maclellan Gym; Chattanooga, Tennessee
Feb 16, 1980		Marshall	W 61–57	18–6 (13–1)	Memorial Auditorium; Greenville, South Carolina
Feb 18, 1980		VMI	W 107–75	19–6 (14–1)	Memorial Auditorium; Greenville, South Carolina
Feb 20, 1980*		South Carolina	W 61–53	20–6	Memorial Auditorium; Greenville, South Carolina
SoCon tournament
Feb 23, 1980*		VMI; Quarterfinals	W 87–75	21–6	Memorial Auditorium; Greenville, South Carolina
Feb 24, 1980*		vs. East Tennessee State; Semifinals	W 93–81	22–6	Roanoke Civic Center; Roanoke, Virginia
Feb 25, 1980*		vs. Marshall; Championship game	W 80–62	23–6	Roanoke Civic Center; Roanoke, Virginia
NCAA tournament
Mar 6, 1980*	(E 10)	vs. (E 7) Tennessee; First round	L 69–80	23–7	Greensboro Coliseum; Greensboro, North Carolina
*Non-conference game. ^{#}Rankings from AP poll. (#) Tournament seedings in parentheses. E=East. All times are in Eastern.
