= Eddie Holbrook =

American basketball player and coach

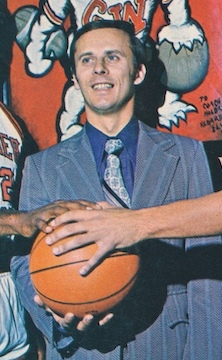
- Holbrook in 1971

Playing career
- 1959–1962: Lenoir–Rhyne

Coaching career (HC unless noted)
- 1964–1978: Gardner–Webb
- 1978–1982: Furman

Administrative career (AD unless noted)
- 1971–1978: Gardner–Webb

Head coaching record
- Overall: 408–113 (.783)
- Tournaments: 0–1 (NCAA Division I); 4–3 (NAIA)

Accomplishments and honors

Championships
- SoCon regular season (1980); SoCon tournament (1980)

Eddie Holbrook is an American former college men's basketball head coach. He is best known for his tenure at Gardner–Webb University between 1964 and 1978. He was hired to coach Gardner–Webb when he was just 24-years old, and during his 14-year career there he compiled an overall record of 344 wins to just 67 losses. Holbrook was the coach when the team transitioned from a junior college program to an NAIA school (beginning in 1969). In his first five years, Holbrook's teams won four conference titles, and two regional titles in 1968 and 1969 while earning an invitation to play in the National Junior College Athletic Association championship tournament in Hutchinson, Kansas – a first for any Gardner–Webb team.

Eight of his players became All-Americans while five of them went onto careers in the National Basketball Association (NBA). In 1973–74, Holbrook's Runnin' Bulldogs won 23 straight games before losing in the NAIA postseason tournament to West Georgia, 116–101. to By the end of his time at Gardner–Webb he had led the Runnin' Bulldogs to seven 20-win seasons and an additional four 30-win seasons. Of his 14 teams, 12 finished the season with national top-10 rankings. In February 2015, the school renamed their home basketball court the "Eddie Holbrook Court."

While coaching Gardner–Webb, Holbrook earned eight coach of the year honors, and her earned the reputation of creating players who embodied mental and physical fortitude. He took two of his teams to the NAIA national postseason tournament including a final four appearance in 1972 (the school's first year with senior college status), and the 1971–72 Runnin' Bulldogs averaged 104.3 points per game during that season. In 1976–'77 season, Holbrook's squad scored over 100 points eighteen times.

Holbrook then coached Furman University's men's basketball team from 1978 to 1982. In just his second season he led the Paladins to the conference regular season and tournament championships, resulting in a berth into the 1980 NCAA tournament. He retired from coaching after four seasons at the school.

In 1993, Holbrook returned to Gardner–Webb and served as a special assistant to the president and Vice President for Development and Community Relations before taking on a similar role at Cleveland Community College.

Prior to coaching, Holbrook played college ball for Lenoir–Rhyne. During his time there, the team won two conference championships, and two NAIA runner-up finishes.

Hollbrook has been inducted into the Lenoir–Rhyne and Gardner–Webb Halls of Fame and was a major force in bringing the American Legion World Series to Shelby, North Carolina.

== Head coaching record ==
Record table
Season	Team	Overall	Conference	Standing	Postseason
Gardner–Webb Runnin' Bulldogs (NJCAA) (1964–1969)
1964–65	Gardner–Webb	15–9			
1965–66	Gardner–Webb	22–6			
1966–67	Gardner–Webb	25–5			
1967–68	Gardner–Webb	31–3			NJCAA Tournament
1968–69	Gardner–Webb	30–3			NJCAA Tournament
Gardner–Webb Runnin' Bulldogs (NAIA) (1969–1978)
1969–70	Gardner–Webb	19–7			
1970–71	Gardner–Webb	20–4			
1971–72	Gardner–Webb	31–5			NAIA Fourth Place
1972–73	Gardner–Webb	18–7			
1973–74	Gardner–Webb	25–3			NAIA Second Round
1974–75	Gardner–Webb	23–3			
1975–76	Gardner–Webb	27–4			
1976–77	Gardner–Webb	30–3			
1977–78	Gardner–Webb	27–3			
Gardner–Webb:		343–65 (.841)			
Furman Paladins (Southern Conference) (1978–1982)
1978–79	Furman	20–9	9–3	2nd	
1979–80	Furman	23–7	14–1	1st	NCAA Division I First Round
1980–81	Furman	11–16	8–8	T–6th	
1981–82	Furman	11–16	7–9	T–6th	
Furman:		65–48 (.575)	38–21 (.644)		
Total:		408–113 (.783)			
National champion Postseason invitational champion Conference regular season champion Conference regular season and conference tournament champion Division regular season champion Division regular season and conference tournament champion Conference tournament champion
