= Bob Zuffelato =

American basketball coach

Biographical details
- Born: November 26, 1937 (age 88); Torrington, Connecticut, U.S.

Playing career
- 1956–1959: Central Connecticut

Coaching career (HC unless noted)
- 1966–1968: Hofstra (assistant)
- 1968–1969: Central Connecticut (assistant)
- 1969–1971: Boston College (assistant)
- 1971–1977: Boston College
- 1977–1979: Marshall (assistant)
- 1979–1983: Marshall
- 1983–1986: Golden State Warriors (assistant)
- 1989–1990: Minnesota Timberwolves (assistant)
- 1990–1993: Dallas Mavericks (assistant)
- 1995–1998: Toronto Raptors (assistant)

Head coaching record
- Overall: 154–121

Robert F. Zuffelato (born November 26, 1937) is currently a scout for the Toronto Raptors with more than four decades of basketball experience at the NBA. He has served with the Raptors since September 1994, when he became the director of scouting. He managed the club's scouting network and was responsible for evaluating professional and collegiate talent. In 1998, he was promoted to director of basketball operations and then became the assistant general manager of the Raptors in 2001, remaining in that position for two seasons before returning to scouting to spend more time with his family.

Zuffelato also served as assistant coach for Toronto from 1995 to 1997 seasons and the second half of the 1997–1998 season. His coaching career began at the University of Michigan in 1959 and then Hofstra University. He had previously served as the head basketball coach at Boston College from 1971 to 1977, where he compiled an 83–80 record. His 1973 and 1974 teams went 21–9 in each year. He also led the Eagles to the ECAC New England Championship, the NCAA East Regional semifinals, and a third-place finish in the NIT.

From 1979 to 1983, he served as the head basketball coach at Marshall. At Marshall, he compiled a 71–41(.634) record. He then went on to serve as an assistant coach with the Golden State Warriors (1983–1986), Minnesota Timberwolves (1989–1990) and Dallas Mavericks (1990–1993).

Zuffelato has been inducted into two halls of fame for his basketball achievements. In April 2000, he was inducted into the Torrington High School Athletic Hall of Fame in Connecticut and in May 2001, he was inducted into the Central Connecticut State University Athletic Hall of Fame for his playing time in both basketball and golf.

== Head coaching record ==
Record table
Season	Team	Overall	Conference	Standing	Postseason
Boston College Eagles (Independent) (1971–1977)
1971–72	Boston College	13–13			
1972–73	Boston College	11–14			
1973–74	Boston College	21–9			NIT Fourth Place
1974–75	Boston College	21–9			NCAA Division I Regional semifinal
1975–76	Boston College	9–17			
1976–77	Boston College	8–18			
Boston College:		83–80 (.509)			
Marshall Thundering Herd (Southern Conference) (1979–1983)
1979–80	Marshall	17–12	10–6	2nd	
1980–81	Marshall	18–10	8–8	T–6th	
1981–82	Marshall	16–11	8–8	T–4th	
1982–83	Marshall	20–8	13–3	2nd	
Marshall:		71–41 (.634)	39–25 (.609)		
Total:		154–121 (.560)			
