= Maclellan Gymnasium =

Multi-purpose arena in Chattanooga, Tennessee

- Maclellan Gymnasium
- Interactive map of Maclellan Gymnasium
- Full name: Mr. and Mrs. Robert Jardin Maclellan Gymnasium
- Location: Chattanooga, Tennessee
- Coordinates: 35°2′54″N 85°17′58″W
- Owner: University of Tennessee at Chattanooga
- Operator: University of Tennessee at Chattanooga
- Capacity: 4,177 volleyball 2,639 wrestling

Construction
- Opened: 1961

Tenants
- Chattanooga Mocs; Women's volleyball Wrestling

Maclellan Gymnasium is a 4,177-seat multi-purpose arena in Chattanooga, Tennessee. It is home to the University of Tennessee at Chattanooga Mocs women's volleyball and wrestling teams. It used to host the Mocs basketball teams until McKenzie Arena opened in 1982.
