= Murray Arnold =

American basketball coach (1938-2012)

Biographical details
- Born: March 4, 1938; University Park, Maryland, U.S.
- Died: November 13, 2012 (aged 74); DeLand, Florida, U.S.

Coaching career (HC unless noted)
- 1957–1960: DeMatha Catholic HS (assistant)
- 1960–1966: DeLand HS
- 1966–1968: Longwood Lyman HS
- 1969–1970: Florida State (GA)
- 1970–1978: Birmingham–Southern
- 1978–1979: Mississippi State (assistant)
- 1979–1985: Chattanooga
- 1985–1986: Chicago Bulls (assistant)
- 1986–1990: Western Kentucky
- 1991–1992: Perth Wildcats
- 1993–1995: Okaloosa-Walton CC
- 1995–2000: Stetson

Accomplishments and honors

Championships
- National Basketball League (Australia) (1991); National Junior College (1995); Florida Class A State (1963)

Awards
- 2x SoCon Coach of the Year (1982, 1983); NBL Coach of the Year (1991)

Murray Arnold (March 4, 1938 – November 13, 2012) was an American basketball coach, best remembered for his college coaching career at Chattanooga, Western Kentucky and Stetson. He also spent two seasons from 1991 coaching the Perth Wildcats of Australia's National Basketball League. In 1991, he led them to a championship.

Arnold started his coaching career at the high school level in the United States, winning a Class A Florida state championship with DeLand High School in DeLand, Florida. Arnold worked his way up to the college level, where he coached at the University of Tennessee at Chattanooga, Western Kentucky University, and Stetson University. He also coached at the junior college level for one season, winning a NJCAA national championship at Okaloosa-Walton Community College.

Arnold died of cancer on November 13, 2012. His wife, Ann Conn, died on January 19, 2022.
