= Varsity Gymnasium =

Arena in Boone, North Carolina, United States

Coordinates: 36°12′48″N 81°40′52″W

- Interactive map of Varsity Gymnasium
- Location: 530 Rivers Street; Boone, North Carolina 28608
- Owner: Appalachian State University
- Operator: Appalachian State University
- Capacity: 1,000

Construction
- Opened: December 7, 1968
- Cost: $2.054 million

Tenant
- Appalachian State Mountaineers wrestling (NCAA)

Varsity Gymnasium is a 1,000 seat multi-purpose arena in Boone, North Carolina. It opened in 1968 and was home to the Appalachian State Mountaineers basketball, volleyball and wrestling teams, until the Holmes Center opened in 2000. The gym is still currently home to the wrestling program. It is also home to the dance studios of the Appalachian State University Department of Theatre and Dance, part of the College of Fine and Applied Arts, as well as the ROTC program.

== History ==
The gymnasium was dedicated December 7, 1968. The original cost of the 104,000-square-foot (9,700 m^{2}) facility was $2 million USD. It had hydraulic stages, seven 172-foot (52 m) supporting beams, physiological laboratories and 8 ticket gates. In addition to the main court area, the gym also included racquetball courts and still houses the school's wrestling room for team practices.

Varsity Gym initially was an 8,000 seat venue, before the opening of the Holmes Center in 2000 and further renovations in 2008. The gym is located adjacent to Roess Dining Hall and directly next to Rivers Street. It was located next to Broome-Kirk gym, which has since been demolished. Concerts at Varsity Gym have included Jimmy Buffett, Bob Dylan, Phish, Steppenwolf, Nitty Gritty Dirt Band, Bruce Springsteen, Ray Charles, The Beach Boys, Ronnie Milsap, and 38 Special.

In 2008, Varsity Gym underwent renovations that included installations of new hardwood floors, and practice facilities for men's and women's basketball, men's and women's track and field, volleyball, and wrestling. It also included adding seating for 1,000 for a competition venue for wrestling, a new scoreboard, and athletic training room facility.

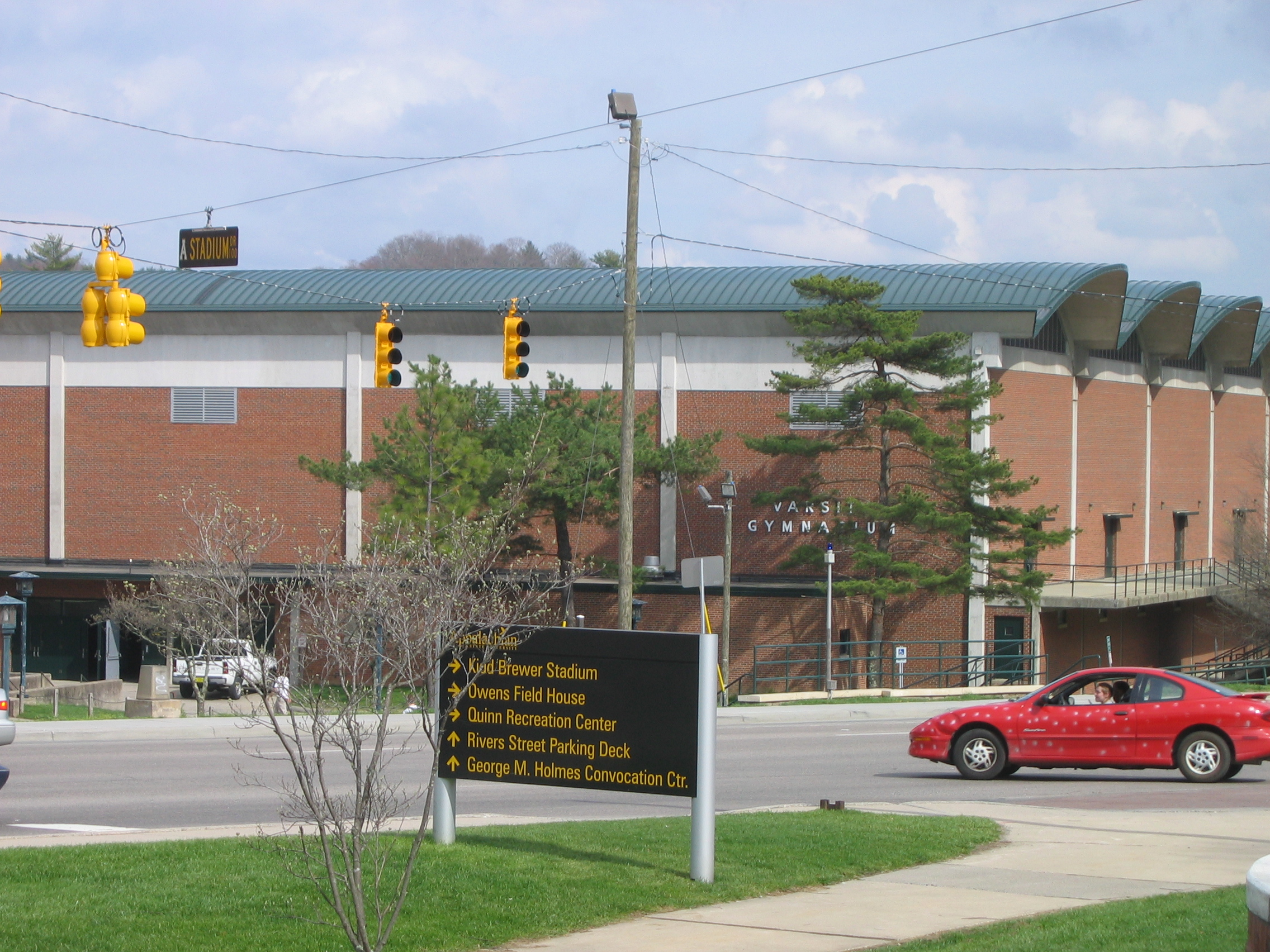
Exterior

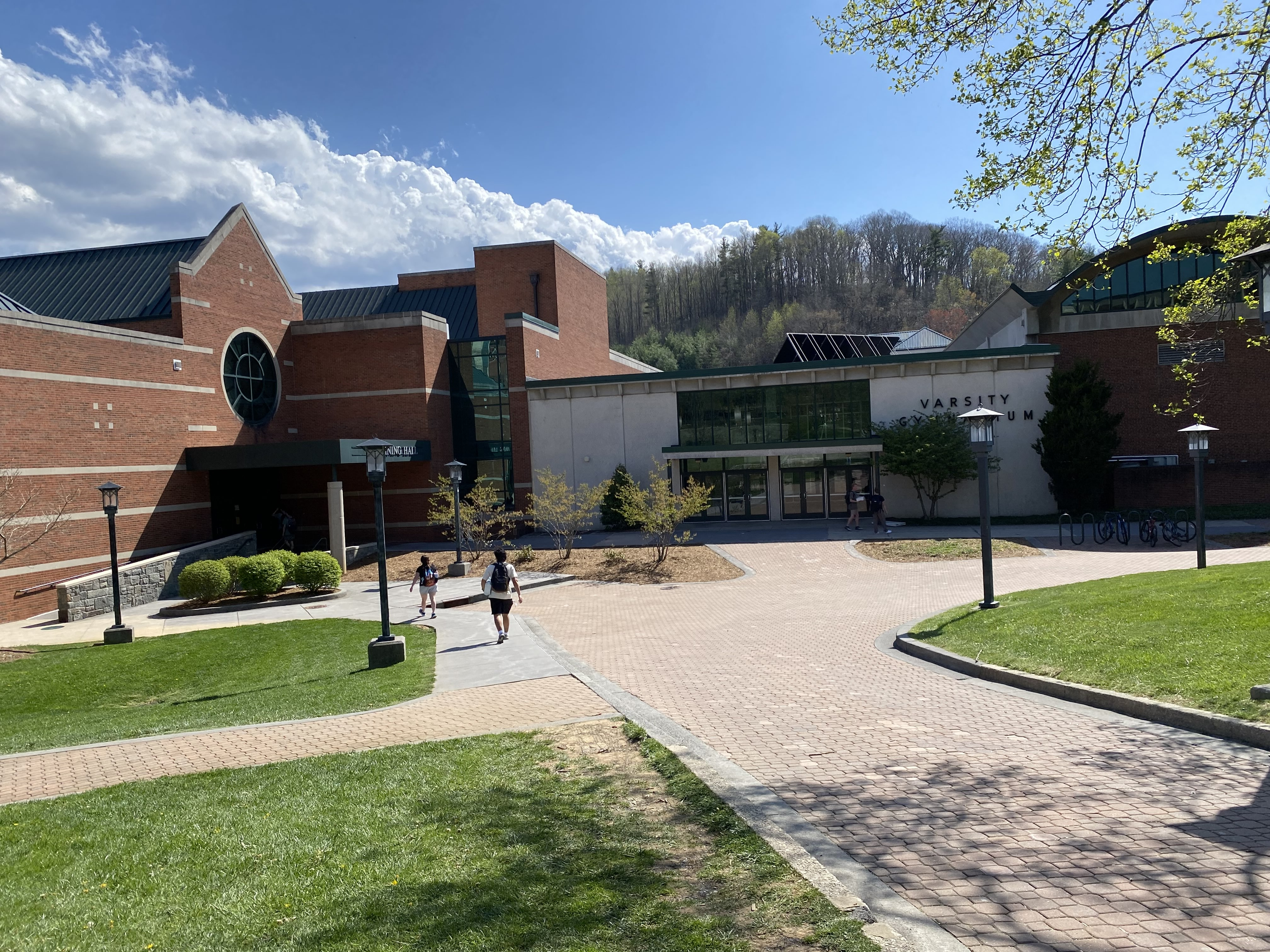
Exterior

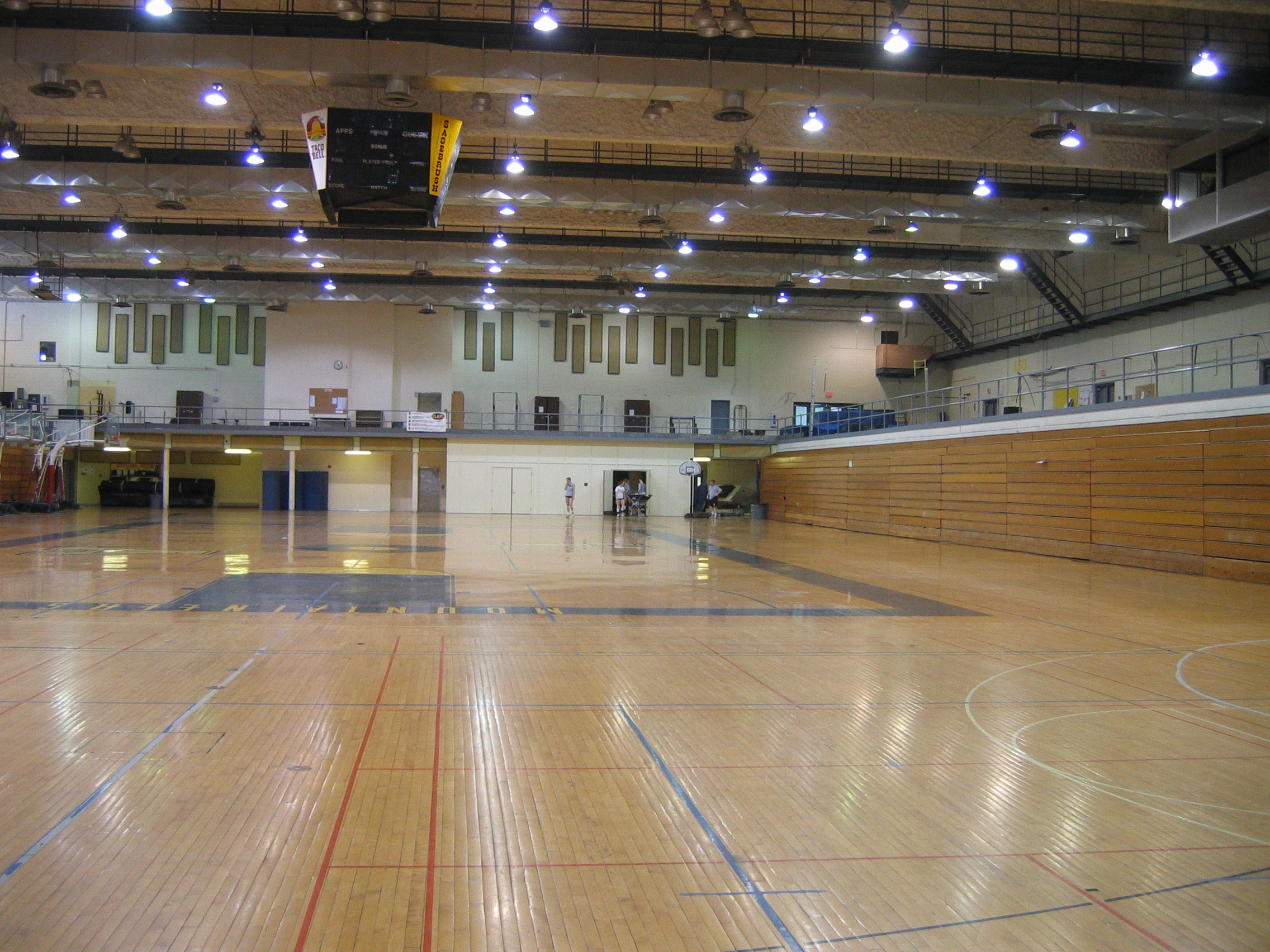
Interior
