= East Tennessee State Buccaneers men's basketball statistical leaders =

The East Tennessee State Buccaneers men's basketball statistical leaders are individual statistical leaders of the East Tennessee State Buccaneers basketball program in various categories, including points, rebounds, assists, steals, and blocks. Within those areas, the lists identify single-game, single-season, and career leaders. The Buccaneers represent East Tennessee State University in the NCAA's Southern Conference.

East Tennessee began competing in intercollegiate basketball in 1918. However, the school's record book does not generally list records from before the 1950s, as records from before this period are often incomplete and inconsistent. Since scoring was much lower in this era, and teams played much fewer games during a typical season, it is likely that few or no players from this era would appear on these lists anyway.

The NCAA did not officially record assists as a stat until the 1983–84 season, and blocks and steals until the 1985–86 season, but East Tennessee State's record books includes players in these stats before these seasons. These lists are updated through the end of the 2024–25 season.

== Scoring ==
Career
| Rk | Player | Points | Seasons |
|---|---|---|---|
| 1 | Tim Smith | 2,300 | 2002–03 2003–04 2004–05 2005–06 |
| 2 | Greg Dennis | 2,204 | 1987–88 1988–89 1989–90 1990–91 1991–92 |
| 3 | Courtney Pigram | 2,043 | 2005–06 2006–07 2007–08 2008–09 |
| 4 | Keith Jennings | 1,988 | 1987–88 1988–89 1989–90 1990–91 |
| 5 | Calvin Talford | 1,872 | 1988–89 1989–90 1990–91 1991–92 |
| 6 | Tom Chilton | 1,801 | 1958–59 1959–60 1960–61 |
| 7 | Mike Smith | 1,783 | 2006–07 2007–08 2008–09 2009–10 2010–11 |
| 8 | Troy Mikell | 1,684 | 1979–80 1980–81 1981–82 1982–83 |
| 9 | Lester Wilson | 1,388 | 2012–13 2013–14 2014–15 2015–16 |
| 10 | Zakee Wadood | 1,382 | 2000–01 2001–02 2002–03 2003–04 |

Season
| Rk | Player | Points | Season |
|---|---|---|---|
| 1 | Tom Chilton | 771 | 1960–61 |
| 2 | Kevin Tiggs | 729 | 2008–09 |
| 3 | T.J. Cromer | 670 | 2016–17 |
| 4 | Greg Dennis | 669 | 1989–90 |
| 5 | Keith Jennings | 662 | 1990–91 |
| 6 | Ge’Lawn Guyn | 651 | 2015–16 |
| 7 | Tim Smith | 645 | 2004–05 |
| 8 | Mike Smith | 626 | 2010–11 |
| 9 | Quimari Peterson | 625 | 2024–25 |
| 10 | Tim Smith | 615 | 2005–06 |

Single game
| Rk | Player | Points | Season | Opponent |
|---|---|---|---|---|
| 1 | Tom Chilton | 52 | 1960–61 | Austin Peay |
| 2 | Tom Chilton | 47 | 1960–61 | W. Kentucky |
| 3 | Jordan King | 42 | 2022-23 | The Citadel |
| | Dimeco Childress | 42 | 2001–02 | W. Carolina |
| | Tom Chilton | 42 | 1959–60 | MTSU |
| 5 | T.J. Cromer | 41 | 2016–17 | Samford |
| | Tim Smith | 41 | 2004–05 | Ga. Southern |
| | Harley Swift | 41 | 1968–69 | W. Kentucky |
| 8 | Tom Chilton | 40 | 1959–60 | Morehead St. |
| | Tom Chilton | 40 | 1960–61 | Miss. Southern |
| 10 | Greg Stephens | 39 | 1997–98 | VMI |
| | Courtney Pigram | 39 | 2008–09 | Jacksonville |

== Rebounds ==
Career
| Rk | Player | Rebounds | Seasons |
|---|---|---|---|
| 1 | Tommy Woods | 1,034 | 1964–65 1965–66 1966–67 |
| 2 | Herb Weaver | 1,015 | 1953–54 1954–55 1955–56 1956–57 |
| 3 | Tom Chilton | 963 | 1957–58 1958–59 1959–60 1960–61 |
| 4 | Greg Dennis | 895 | 1987–88 1988–89 1989–90 1990–91 1991–92 |
| 5 | Scott Place | 825 | 1976–77 1977–78 1978–79 1979–80 |
| 6 | Zakee Wadood | 822 | 2000–01 2001–02 2002–03 2003–04 |
| 7 | Isiah Brown | 790 | 2008–09 2009–10 2010–11 2011–12 |
| 8 | Mike Smith | 783 | 2006–07 2007–08 2008–09 2009–10 2010–11 |
| 9 | Jaden Seymour | 744 | 2021–22 2022–23 2023–24 2024–25 |
| 10 | Jerald Fields | 717 | 2000–01 2001–02 2002–03 2003–04 |

Season
| Rk | Player | Rebounds | Season |
|---|---|---|---|
| 1 | Herb Weaver | 607 | 1956–57 |
| 2 | Tommy Woods | 450 | 1964–65 |
| 3 | Herb Weaver | 408 | 1955–56 |
| 4 | Tom Chilton | 403 | 1960–61 |
| 5 | Jack Waycaster | 368 | 1954–55 |
| 6 | Jeromy Rodriguez | 361 | 2018–19 |
| | Tommy Woods | 361 | 1965–66 |
| 8 | Leo Cooper | 343 | 1956–57 |
| 9 | Herb Edmonds | 338 | 1956–57 |
| 10 | Ernie Sims | 327 | 1966–67 |

Single game
| Rk | Player | Rebounds | Season | Opponent |
|---|---|---|---|---|
| 1 | Tommy Woods | 38 | 1964–65 | MTSU |
| 2 | Herb Weaver | 32 | 1956–57 | Milligan |
| | Tommy Woods | 32 | 1964–65 | East Carolina |
| 4 | Herb Weaver | 31 | 1956–57 | Ky. Wesleyan |
| 5 | Dick Creech | 30 | 1954–55 | MTSU |
| | Herb Weaver | 30 | 1956–57 | Ky. Wesleyan |
| | Herb Weaver | 30 | 1956–57 | LMU |
| 8 | Herb Weaver | 29 | 1955–56 | Spring Hill |
| 9 | Herb Weaver | 28 | 1956–57 | Centenary |
| | Tommy Woods | 28 | 1964–65 | Wofford |

== Assists ==
Career
| Rk | Player | Assists | Seasons |
|---|---|---|---|
| 1 | Keith Jennings | 983 | 1987–88 1988–89 1989–90 1990–91 |
| 2 | Tim Smith | 508 | 2002–03 2003–04 2004–05 2005–06 |
| 3 | Courtney Pigram | 416 | 2005–06 2006–07 2007–08 2008–09 |
| 4 | Petey McClain | 412 | 2012–13 2013–14 2014–15 2015–16 |
| 5 | Adam Sollazzo | 409 | 2008–09 2009–10 2010–11 2011–12 |
| 6 | Marc Quesenberry | 363 | 1979–80 1980–81 1981–82 1982–83 |
| 7 | Desonta Bradford | 349 | 2014–15 2015–16 2016–17 2017–18 |
| 8 | Carniel Manuel | 322 | 1983–84 1984–85 1985–86 1986–87 |
| 9 | Allen Strothers | 308 | 2022–23 2023–24 2024–25 2025–26 |
| 10 | Greg Stephens | 265 | 1997–98 1998–99 |

Season
| Rk | Player | Assists | Season |
|---|---|---|---|
| 1 | Keith Jennings | 301 | 1990–91 |
| 2 | Keith Jennings | 297 | 1989–90 |
| 3 | Keith Jennings | 202 | 1988–89 |
| 4 | Keith Jennings | 183 | 1987–88 |
| 5 | David Sloan | 160 | 2021–22 |
| 6 | Steve Horne | 156 | 1975–76 |
| 7 | Tim Smith | 145 | 2003–04 |
| | Adam Sollazzo | 145 | 2010–11 |
| 9 | Marc Quesenberry | 140 | 1981–82 |
| 10 | Courtney Pigram | 138 | 2008–09 |

Single game
| Rk | Player | Assists | Season | Opponent |
|---|---|---|---|---|
| 1 | Keith Jennings | 19 | 1990–91 | App. State |
| 2 | Courtney Pigram | 18 | 2006–07 | Mercer |
| | Keith Jennings | 18 | 1990–91 | Citadel |
| 4 | Keith Jennings | 16 | 1990–91 | VMI |
| 5 | Keith Jennings | 15 | 1990–91 | Chattanooga |
| 6 | Keith Jennings | 14 | 1990–91 | W. Carolina |
| 7 | Keith Jennings | 13 | 1990–91 | Memphis St. |
| | Major Geer | 13 | 1990–91 | Belmont |
| | Keith Jennings | 13 | 1989–90 | Austin Peay |
| | Keith Jennings | 13 | 1989–90 | W. Carolina |
| | Keith Jennings | 13 | 1987–88 | VMI |

== Steals ==
Career
| Rk | Player | Steals | Seasons |
|---|---|---|---|
| 1 | Keith Jennings | 334 | 1987–88 1988–89 1989–90 1990–91 |
| 2 | Tim Smith | 313 | 2002–03 2003–04 2004–05 2005–06 |
| 3 | Zakee Wadood | 246 | 2000–01 2001–02 2002–03 2003–04 |
| 4 | Courtney Pigram | 232 | 2005–06 2006–07 2007–08 2008–09 |
| 5 | Trazel Silvers | 183 | 1990–91 1991–92 1992–93 1993–94 |
| 6 | Jerald Fields | 167 | 2000–01 2001–02 2002–03 2003–04 |
| 7 | A.J. Merriweather | 160 | 2013–14 2014–15 2015–16 2016–17 |
| 8 | Adam Sollazzo | 148 | 2008–09 2009–10 2010–11 2011–12 |
| 9 | Mike Smith | 146 | 2006–07 2007–08 2008–09 2009–10 2010–11 |
| | Desonta Bradford | 146 | 2014–15 2015–16 2016–17 2017–18 |

Season
| Rk | Player | Steals | Season |
|---|---|---|---|
| 1 | Keith Jennings | 109 | 1990–91 |
| 2 | Tim Smith | 95 | 2005–06 |
| 3 | Zakee Wadood | 93 | 2002–03 |
| 4 | Zakee Wadood | 92 | 2003–04 |
| 5 | Courtney Pigram | 89 | 2006–07 |
| 6 | Keith Jennings | 84 | 1989–90 |
| 7 | Tim Smith | 82 | 2003–04 |
| 8 | Trazel Silvers | 77 | 1993–94 |
| 9 | Keith Jennings | 75 | 1987–88 |
| 10 | Tim Smith | 73 | 2002–03 |

Single game
| Rk | Player | Steals | Season | Opponent |
|---|---|---|---|---|
| 1 | Zakee Wadood | 10 | 2003–04 | Clemson |
| 2 | Tray Boyd III | 8 | 2019–20 | Mars Hill |
| | Eryk Thomas | 8 | 2006–07 | Jacksonville |
| | Trazel Silvers | 8 | 1991–92 | App. State |
| | Tim Smith | 8 | 2002–03 | UVa.-Wise |
| | Tim Smith | 8 | 2005–06 | Campbell |
| | Travis Strong | 8 | 2005–06 | Morehead State |
| 8 | Zakee Wadood | 7 | 2001–02 | Appalachian St. |
| | Zakee Wadood | 7 | 2002–03 | Appalachian St. |
| | Zakee Wadood | 7 | 2002–03 | Wake Forest |
| | Zakee Wadood | 7 | 2002–03 | Juniata |
| | Cliff Decoster | 7 | 2000–01 | VMI |
| | Keith Jennings | 7 | 1990–91 | App. State |
| | Alvin West | 7 | 1990–91 | Chattanooga |
| | Keith Jennings | 7 | 1989–90 | Wofford |
| | Sheldon Cooley | 7 | 2011–12 | Appalachian State |
| | Daivien Williamson | 7 | 2018–19 | Green Bay |
| | Ledarrius Brewer | 7 | 2020–21 | Western Carolina |
| | Jordan King | 7 | 2022-23 | The Citadel |

== Blocks ==
Career
| Rk | Player | Blocks | Seasons |
|---|---|---|---|
| 1 | Isiah Brown | 183 | 2008–09 2009–10 2010–11 2011–12 |
| 2 | Zakee Wadood | 182 | 2000–01 2001–02 2002–03 2003–04 |
| 3 | Greg Dennis | 174 | 1987–88 1988–89 1989–90 1990–91 1991–92 |
| 4 | Jerald Fields | 167 | 2000–01 2001–02 2002–03 2003–04 |
| 5 | Brad Nuckles | 158 | 2002–03 2003–04 2004–05 2005–06 2006–07 |
| 6 | Jaden Seymour | 106 | 2021–22 2022–23 2023–24 2024–25 |
| 7 | Justin McClellan | 83 | 1992–93 1993–94 1994–95 1995–96 |
| 8 | Phil Powe | 78 | 1992–93 1993–94 1994–95 1995–96 |
| 9 | Isaac Banks | 75 | 2013–14 2014–15 2015–16 2016–17 |
| 10 | Peter Jurkin | 75 | 2015–16 2016–17 2017–18 |

Season
| Rk | Player | Blocks | Season |
|---|---|---|---|
| 1 | Jadyn Parker | 73 | 2023–24 |
| 2 | Isiah Brown | 71 | 2010–11 |
| 3 | Zakee Wadood | 70 | 2003–04 |
| 4 | Zakee Wadood | 66 | 2002–03 |
| 5 | Jerald Fields | 56 | 2001–02 |
| 6 | Brad Nuckles | 55 | 2006–07 |
| 7 | Greg Dennis | 53 | 1989–90 |
| 8 | Greg Hamlin | 52 | 2008–09 |
| | Jerald Fields | 52 | 2003–04 |
| 10 | Greg Dennis | 50 | 1991–92 |

Single game
| Rk | Player | Blocks | Season | Opponent |
|---|---|---|---|---|
| 1 | David Burrell | 6 | 2016–17 | UNC Greensboro |
| | Brad Nuckles | 6 | 2006–07 | Jacksonville |
| | Eryk Thomas | 6 | 2006–07 | Jacksonville |
| | Eryk Thomas | 6 | 2006–07 | Milligan |
| | Jerald Fields | 6 | 2001–02 | UNCG |
| | Jerald Fields | 6 | 2001–02 | Guilford |
| | Zakee Wadood | 6 | 2003–04 | Texas Tech |
| | Greg Dennis | 6 | 1991–92 | W. Carolina |
| | Greg Hamlin | 6 | 2007–08 | North Florida |
| | Isiah Brown | 6 | 2010–11 | Belmont |
