= 1993–94 Chattanooga Mocs basketball team =

American college basketball season

1993–94 Chattanooga Mocs basketball

SoCon regular season champion SoCon tournament champion

NCAA tournament
- Conference: Southern Conference
- Record: 23–7 (14–4 SoCon)
- Head coach: Mack McCarthy (9th season)
- Home arena: UTC Arena

1993–94 Southern Conference men's basketball standings
	Conf.				Overall
Team	W		L	PCT	W		L	PCT
Chattanooga †	14	–	4	.778	23	–	7	.767
Davidson	13	–	5	.722	22	–	8	.733
East Tennessee State	13	–	5	.722	16	–	14	.533
Appalachian State	12	–	6	.667	16	–	11	.593
Georgia Southern	9	–	9	.500	14	–	14	.500
Western Carolina	8	–	10	.444	12	–	16	.429
Marshall	7	–	11	.389	9	–	18	.333
The Citadel	6	–	12	.333	11	–	16	.407
Furman	6	–	12	.333	10	–	18	.357
VMI	2	–	16	.111	5	–	23	.179
† 1994 SoCon Tournament winner As of April 30, 1994; Rankings from AP poll

The 1993–94 Chattanooga Mocs basketball team represented the University of Tennessee at Chattanooga as a member of the Southern Conference during the 1993–94 NCAA Division I men's basketball season. Their head coach was Mack McCarthy and the team played their home games at the UTC Arena. After finishing atop the conference regular season standings, the Mocs won the SoCon tournament, earning an automatic bid to the 1994 NCAA tournament. Chattanooga was beaten in the opening round by No. 4 seed Kansas, 102–73.

== Roster ==
1993–94 Chattanooga Mocs men's basketball team
Players
Coaches

Pos.	#	Name	Height	Weight	Year	Previous school	Hometown
F	4	Terrell Owens	6 ft 3 in (1.91 m)	200 lb (91 kg)	So	Benjamin Russell	Alexander City, Alabama
G	10	Chad Copeland	5 ft 11 in (1.8 m)	170 lb (77 kg)	Sr	Bradley Central	Cleveland, Tennessee
G	11	Raymond Isabelle	5 ft 11 in (1.8 m)	183 lb (83 kg)	Fr	Bluefield	Bluefield, West Virginia
G	12	Rich Burns	6 ft 3 in (1.91 m)	190 lb (86 kg)	RS Sr	Cleveland	Cleveland, Tennessee
G	15	Fred Moore	6 ft 3 in (1.91 m)	185 lb (84 kg)	Jr	Sparkman	Toney, Alabama
G	20	Shane Neal	6 ft 2 in (1.88 m)	150 lb (68 kg)	RS Jr	Alan C. Pope	Marietta, Georgia
F	22	Patrick Henderson	6 ft 8 in (2.03 m)	205 lb (93 kg)	So	Southeast	Bradenton, Florida
G	23	Lamonte Woods	6 ft 4 in (1.93 m)	185 lb (84 kg)	Sr	Kenwood Academy	Chicago, Illinois
F	30	Tim Whitlock	6 ft 8 in (2.03 m)	180 lb (82 kg)	Jr	Morgan County	Madison, Georgia
F	31	Maurio Hanson	6 ft 5 in (1.96 m)	230 lb (104 kg)	Jr	Garinger	Charlotte, North Carolina
F	32	Brandon Born	6 ft 7 in (2.01 m)	185 lb (84 kg)	RS Jr	Ringgold	Ringgold, Georgia
F	40	Gary Robb	6 ft 5 in (1.96 m)	205 lb (93 kg)	Sr	Fern Creek	Louisville, Kentucky
C	42	Roger Smith	6 ft 10 in (2.08 m)	240 lb (109 kg)	Jr	Ringgold (FL)	Miami, Florida
G	44	John Oliver	6 ft 5 in (1.96 m)	200 lb (91 kg)	Fr	Francis Marion	Marion, Alabama
F	50	Hiram Thomas	6 ft 8 in (2.03 m)	185 lb (84 kg)	Fr	Groveport Madison	Groveport, Ohio

Head coach

- Mack McCarthy

Assistant coach(es)

Legend

- (C) Team captain
- (S) Suspended
- (I) Ineligible
- (W) Walk-on
- Injured
- Current redshirt

Roster

== Schedule and results ==
Date time, TV	Rank^{#}	Opponent^{#}	Result	Record	Site (attendance) city, state
Regular season
Nov 27, 1993*		USC Aiken	W 97–71	1–0	UTC Arena; Chattanooga, Tennessee
Dec 1, 1993*		at Alabama	W 67–57	2–0	Coleman Coliseum; Tuscaloosa, Alabama
Dec 4, 1993*		at No. 5 Michigan	L 86–97	2–1	Crisler Arena; Ann Arbor, Michigan
Dec 11, 1993*		Columbus	W 81–70	3–1	UTC Arena; Chattanooga, Tennessee
Dec 21, 1993*		at No. 10 Purdue	L 66–74	3–2	Mackey Arena; West Lafayette, Indiana
Dec 29, 1993*		Alabama State	W 104–88	4–2	UTC Arena; Chattanooga, Tennessee
Dec 30, 1993*		South Alabama	W 85–69	5–2	UTC Arena; Chattanooga, Tennessee
Jan 2, 1994*		Southern Miss	W 98–95	6–2	UTC Arena; Chattanooga, Tennessee
Jan 5, 1994		at Furman	W 82–81	7–2 (1–0)	Greenville Memorial Auditorium; Greenville, South Carolina
Jan 8, 1994		Marshall	W 92–81	8–2 (2–0)	UTC Arena; Chattanooga, Tennessee
Jan 10, 1994		VMI	W 82–62	9–2 (3–0)	UTC Arena; Chattanooga, Tennessee
Jan 13, 1994		Davidson	W 80–70	10–2 (4–0)	UTC Arena; Chattanooga, Tennessee
Jan 15, 1994		Western Carolina	W 78–68	11–2 (5–0)	UTC Arena; Chattanooga, Tennessee
Jan 20, 1994		at Appalachian State	L 76–84	11–3 (5–1)	Varsity Gymnasium; Boone, North Carolina
Jan 22, 1994		Georgia Southern	W 83–78	12–3 (6–1)	UTC Arena; Chattanooga, Tennessee
Jan 24, 1994		The Citadel	W 79–74	13–3 (7–1)	UTC Arena; Chattanooga, Tennessee
Jan 26, 1994		at East Tennessee State	L 85–93	13–4 (7–2)	Memorial Center; Johnson City, Tennessee
Jan 29, 1994		at Davidson	L 71–72	13–5 (7–3)	John M. Belk Arena; Davidson, North Carolina
Feb 5, 1994		East Tennessee State	W 86–84	14–5 (8–3)	UTC Arena; Chattanooga, Tennessee
Feb 7, 1994		Appalachian State	W 84–75	15–5 (9–3)	UTC Arena; Chattanooga, Tennessee
Feb 12, 1994		at VMI	W 92–72	16–5 (10–3)	Cameron Hall; Lexington, Virginia
Feb 14, 1994		at Marshall	W 81–77	17–5 (11–3)	Cam Henderson Center; Huntington, West Virginia
Feb 19, 1994		at Western Carolina	L 62–86	17–6 (11–4)	Ramsey Center; Cullowhee, North Carolina
Feb 23, 1994		Furman	W 78–68	18–6 (12–4)	UTC Arena; Chattanooga, Tennessee
Feb 26, 1994		at The Citadel	W 83–65	19–6 (13–4)	McAlister Field House; Charleston, South Carolina
Feb 28, 1994		at Georgia Southern	W 71–60	20–6 (14–4)	Hanner Fieldhouse; Statesboro, Georgia
SoCon tournament
Mar 4, 1994*	(1)	vs. (9) Furman; Quarterfinals	W 85–81	21–6	Asheville Civic Center; Asheville, North Carolina
Mar 5, 1994*	(1)	vs. (5) Georgia Southern; Semifinals	W 99–91 ^{OT}	22–6	Asheville Civic Center; Asheville, North Carolina
Mar 6, 1994*	(1)	vs. (2) Davidson; Championship game	W 65–64	23–6	Asheville Civic Center; Asheville, North Carolina
NCAA tournament
Mar 17, 1994*	(13 SE)	vs. (4 SE) No. 13 Kansas; First round	L 73–102	23–7	Rupp Arena; Lexington, Kentucky
*Non-conference game. ^{#}Rankings from AP poll. (#) Tournament seedings in parentheses. SE=Southeast. All times are in Eastern Time.
