= 1990–91 East Tennessee State Buccaneers men's basketball team =

American college basketball season

1990–91 East Tennessee State Buccaneers men's basketball
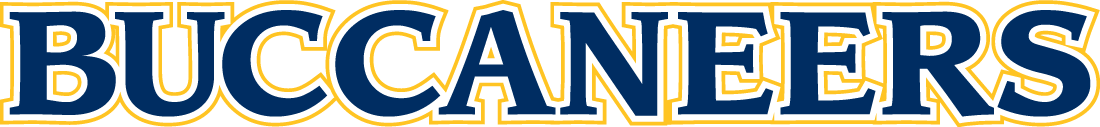

SoCon regular season co-champions and tournament champions

NCAA tournament, first round
- Conference: Southern Conference

Ranking
- Coaches: No. 15
- AP: No. 17
- Record: 28–5 (11–3 SoCon)
- Head coach: Alan LeForce (1st season)
- Home arena: ETSU/Mountain States Health; Alliance Athletic Center

1990–91 Southern Conference men's basketball standings
	Conf.				Overall
Team	W		L	PCT	W		L	PCT
Furman	11	–	3	.786	20	–	9	.690
No. 17 East Tennessee State†	11	–	3	.786	28	–	5	.848
Chattanooga	11	–	3	.786	19	–	10	.655
Appalachian State	7	–	7	.500	16	–	14	.533
Marshall	7	–	7	.500	14	–	14	.500
VMI	5	–	9	.357	10	–	18	.357
Western Carolina	3	–	11	.214	11	–	17	.393
The Citadel	1	–	13	.071	6	–	22	.214
† 1991 SoCon Tournament winner As of April 30, 1991; Rankings from AP poll

The 1990–91 East Tennessee State Buccaneers basketball team represented East Tennessee State University during the 1990-91 NCAA Division I men's basketball season. The team was led by first-year coach Alan LeForce. LeForce was an assistant the previous year under coach Les Robinson who left to become head coach at NC State. The Bucs finished the season 28–5 and 11–3 in Southern Conference play to finish in a tie for first place. They won the Southern Conference tournament championship in Asheville to receive the automatic berth to the NCAA tournament as the No. 10 seed in the Midwest region. They lost to No. 7 Iowa in the first round. They finished ranked No. 17 in the final AP poll.

== Roster ==
Player	Class	Pos	Height	Summary
Keith Jennings		G	5-7	20.1 Pts 3.9 Reb 9.1 Ast
Rodney English		F	6-4	13.8 Pts 5.8 Reb 1.2 Ast
Calvin Talford		F	6-4	14.6 Pts 4.4 Reb 1.0 Ast
Alvin West		G	6-3	10.6 Pts 2.7 Reb 1.4 Ast
Marty Story		F	6-3	9.1 Pts 3.8 Reb 1.0 Ast
Major Geer		G	6-1	8.5 Pts 1.7 Reb 1.5 Ast
Jerry Pelphrey		F	6-5	6.8 Pts 2.5 Reb 1.6 Ast
Trazel Silvers		F	6-5	5.0 Pts 2.6 Reb 0.4 Ast
Darell Jones		F	6-9	3.6 Pts 3.5 Reb 0.8 Ast
Eric Palmer		G	5-7	1.4 Pts 0.6 Reb 0.7 Ast
Michael Woods		F	6-5	1.0 Pts 0.6 Reb 0.6 Ast
Greg Dennis		C	6-11	11.5 Pts 6.0 Reb 2.0 Ast
Loren Riddick		G	6-2	1.0 Pts 1.0 Reb 0.2 Ast

== Schedule and results ==
Date time, TV	Rank^{#}	Opponent^{#}	Result	Record	Site city, state
Regular season
Nov 14, 1990*		at BYU; NIT Preseason Tournament	W 83–80	1–0	Marriott Center; Provo, Utah
Nov 16, 1990*		vs. No. 3 Arizona; NIT Preseason Tournament	L 79–88	1–1	Marriott Center; Provo, Utah
Nov 26, 1990*		George Mason	W 105–92	2–1	Memorial Center; Johnson City, Tennessee
Dec 1, 1990*		Austin Peay	W 103–86	3–1	Memorial Center; Johnson City, Tennessee
*		Eckerd	W 112–48	4–1	Memorial Center; Johnson City, Tennessee
*		Wofford	W 92–50	5–1	Memorial Center; Johnson City, Tennessee
Dec 8, 1990*		at James Madison	W 68–65	6–1	JMU Convocation Center; Harrisonburg, Virginia
Dec 15, 1990*	No. 24	at Cincinnati	W 90–79	7–1	Myrl H. Shoemaker Center; Cincinnati, Ohio
Dec 22, 1990*	No. 21	NC State	W 94–91	8–1	Memorial Center; Johnson City, Tennessee
Dec 29, 1990*	No. 20	at George Mason	W 96–86	9–1	Patriot Center; Fairfax, Virginia
Jan 5, 1991	No. 17	Appalachian State	W 89–70	10–1 (1–0)	Memorial Center; Johnson City, Tennessee
Jan 10, 1991*	No. 16	Liberty	W 86–55	11–1	Memorial Center; Johnson City, Tennessee
Jan 12, 1991	No. 16	Furman	W 95–79	12–1 (2–0)	Memorial Center; Johnson City, Tennessee
Jan 14, 1991	No. 15	The Citadel	W 96–76	13–1 (3–0)	Memorial Center; Johnson City, Tennessee
Jan 19, 1991	No. 15	at Western Carolina	W 93–76	14–1 (4–0)	Ramsey Center; Cullowhee, North Carolina
Jan 21, 1991	No. 12	at Chattanooga	L 74–76	14–2 (4–1)	McKenzie Arena; Chattanooga, Tennessee
Jan 26, 1991	No. 12	at VMI	W 97–66	15–2 (5–1)	Cameron Hall; Lexington, Virginia
Jan 28, 1991	No. 16	Marshall	W 99–88	16–2 (6–1)	Memorial Center; Johnson City, Tennessee
Jan 30, 1991*	No. 16	at Memphis State	W 105–102 ^{OT}	17–2	Mid-South Coliseum; Memphis, Tennessee
Feb 2, 1991	No. 16	at Appalachian State	W 94–78	18–2 (7–1)	Varsity Gymnasium; Boone, North Carolina
Feb 4, 1991	No. 13	Chattanooga	W 93–70	19–2 (8–1)	Memorial Center; Johnson City, Tennessee
Feb 1991*	No. 13	Belmont Abbey	W 110–70	20–2	Memorial Center; Johnson City, Tennessee
Feb 9, 1991	No. 13	at The Citadel	W 101–69	21–2 (9–1)	McAlister Field House; Charleston, South Carolina
Feb 11, 1991	No. 10	at Furman	L 93–104	21–3 (9–2)	Greenville Memorial Auditorium; Greenville, South Carolina
Feb 14, 1991*	No. 10	at Liberty	W 90–49	22–3	Vines Center; Lynchburg, Virginia
Feb 16, 1991*	No. 10	at UNC Charlotte	W 96–80	23–3	Charlotte Coliseum; Charlotte, North Carolina
Feb 18, 1991	No. 13	Western Carolina	W 102–78	24–3 (10–2)	Memorial Center; Johnson City, Tennessee
Feb 23, 1991	No. 13	at Marshall	L 103–107 ^{OT}	24–4 (10–3)	Cam Henderson Center; Huntington, West Virginia
Feb 25, 1991	No. 19	VMI	W 88–76	25–4 (11–3)	Memorial Center; Johnson City, Tennessee
SoCon tournament
Mar 1, 1991*	(2) No. 19	vs. (7) The Citadel; SoCon Tournament Quarterfinal	W 99–70	26–4	Asheville Civic Center; Asheville, North Carolina
Mar 2, 1991*	(2) No. 19	vs. (3) Chattanooga; SoCon Tournament Semifinal	W 104–71	27–4	Asheville Civic Center; Asheville, North Carolina
Mar 3, 1991*	(2) No. 19	vs. (4) Appalachian State; SoCon tournament championship	W 101–82	28–4	Asheville Civic Center; Asheville, North Carolina
NCAA tournament
Mar 14, 1991*	(10 MW) No. 15	vs. (7 MW) Iowa; First Round	L 73–76	28–5	Hubert H. Humphrey Metrodome; Minneapolis, Minnesota
*Non-conference game. ^{#}Rankings from AP Poll. (#) Tournament seedings in parentheses. MW=Midwest. All times are in Eastern Time.

== Rankings ==
Pre	11/27	12/4	12/11	12/18	12/25	1/1	1/8	1/15	1/22	1/29	2/5	2/12	2/19	2/26	3/5	Final
-	-	-	24	21	20	17	16	15	12	16	13	10	13	19	15	17

== Awards and honors ==
- Keith Jennings – SoCon Player of the Year (Coaches), Consensus Second-Team All-American
