= The Citadel Bulldogs basketball, 1990–1994 =

The Citadel Bulldogs basketball teams represented The Citadel, The Military College of South Carolina in Charleston, South Carolina, United States. The program was established in 1900–01, and has continuously fielded a team since 1912–13. Their primary rivals are College of Charleston, Furman and VMI.

== 1989–90 ==
1989–1990 The Citadel Bulldogs men's basketball
- Conference: Southern Conference
- Record: 13–16 (5–9 SoCon)
- Head coach: Randy Nesbit
- Home arena: McAlister Field House

1989–90 Southern Conference men's basketball standings
	Conf.				Overall
Team	W		L	PCT	W		L	PCT
East Tennessee State †	12	–	2	.857	27	–	7	.794
Marshall	9	–	5	.643	15	–	13	.536
Appalachian State	8	–	6	.571	19	–	11	.633
VMI	7	–	7	.500	14	–	15	.483
Chattanooga	7	–	7	.500	14	–	14	.500
The Citadel	5	–	9	.357	12	–	16	.429
Furman	5	–	9	.357	15	–	16	.484
Western Carolina	3	–	11	.214	10	–	18	.357
† SoCon Tournament winner As of April 30, 1990; Rankings from AP poll

The 1989–90 season was the first at the newly renovated McAlister Field House.

Date time, TV	Opponent	Result	Record	Site city, state
Nov 13*	Estonia	W 79–71	1–0	McAlister Field House; Charleston, South Carolina
Nov 28*	Clemson	L 54–71	1–1	McAlister Field House; Charleston, South Carolina
Nov 30*	Methodist	W 85–71	2–1	McAlister Field House; Charleston, South Carolina
Dec 2*	Coker	W 69–52	3–1	McAlister Field House; Charleston, South Carolina
Dec 6*	at Coastal Carolina	L 76–78	3–2	Kimbel Arena; Conway, South Carolina
Dec 9*	at Dayton	L 76–97	3–3	University of Dayton Arena; Dayton, Ohio
Dec 16*	Barry	W 81–63	4–3	McAlister Field House; Charleston, South Carolina
Jan 3*	at No. 13 Duke	L 69–108	4–4	Cameron Indoor Stadium; Durham, North Carolina
Jan 6	at Furman	W 90–80	5–4 (1–0)	Greenville Memorial Auditorium; Greenville, South Carolina
Jan 8*	Liberty	W 82–66	6–4	McAlister Field House; Charleston, South Carolina
Jan 11*	College of Charleston	L 58–81	6–5	McAlister Field House; Charleston, South Carolina
Jan 13	at Appalachian State	L 64–101	6–6 (1–1)	Varsity Gymnasium; Boone, North Carolina
Jan 15	at East Tennessee State	L 57–92	6–7 (1–2)	Memorial Center; Johnson City, Tennessee
Jan 20	Marshall	W 64–52	7–7 (2–2)	McAlister Field House; Charleston, South Carolina
Jan 22	VMI	W 89–73	8–7 (3–2)	McAlister Field House; Charleston, South Carolina
Jan 27	at Chattanooga	L 61–82	8–8 (3–3)	McKenzie Arena; Chattanooga, Tennessee
Jan 29	at Western Carolina	L 62–72	8–9 (3–4)	Ramsey Center; Cullowhee, North Carolina
Feb 3	Furman	W 74–70	9–9 (4–4)	McAlister Field House; Charleston, South Carolina
Feb 5*	Davidson	W 76–66	10–9	McAlister Field House; Charleston, South Carolina
Feb 7*	South Carolina State	W 83–77	11–9	McAlister Field House; Charleston, South Carolina
Feb 10	East Tennessee State	L 86–87	11–10 (4–5)	McAlister Field House; Charleston, South Carolina
Feb 12	Appalachian State	L 80–88	11–11 (4–6)	McAlister Field House; Charleston, South Carolina
Feb 14*	South Carolina	L 65–69	11–12	McAlister Field House; Charleston, South Carolina
Feb 17	at VMI	L 76–77	11–13 (4–7)	Cameron Hall; Lexington, Virginia
Feb 19	at Marshall	L 85–91	11–14 (4–8)	Cam Henderson Center; Huntington, West Virginia
Feb 22*	at Davidson	W 85–76	12–14	John M. Belk Arena; Davidson, North Carolina
Feb 24	Western Carolina	W 80–72 ^{OT}	13–14 (5–8)	McAlister Field House; Charleston, South Carolina
Feb 26	Chattanooga	L 78–81	13–15 (5–9)	McAlister Field House; Charleston, South Carolina
1990 Southern Conference men's basketball tournament
Mar 2	vs. Appalachian State	L 71–86	13–16	Asheville Civic Center; Asheville, North Carolina
*Non-conference game. (#) Tournament seedings in parentheses. All times are in Eastern Time.

== 1990–91 ==
1990–1991 The Citadel Bulldogs men's basketball
- Conference: Southern Conference
- Record: 6–22 (1–13 SoCon)
- Head coach: Randy Nesbit
- Home arena: McAlister Field House

1990–91 Southern Conference men's basketball standings
	Conf.				Overall
Team	W		L	PCT	W		L	PCT
Furman	11	–	3	.786	20	–	9	.690
No. 17 East Tennessee State†	11	–	3	.786	28	–	5	.848
Chattanooga	11	–	3	.786	19	–	10	.655
Appalachian State	7	–	7	.500	16	–	14	.533
Marshall	7	–	7	.500	14	–	14	.500
VMI	5	–	9	.357	10	–	18	.357
Western Carolina	3	–	11	.214	11	–	17	.393
The Citadel	1	–	13	.071	6	–	22	.214
† 1991 SoCon Tournament winner As of April 30, 1991; Rankings from AP poll

Date time, TV	Opponent	Result	Record	Site city, state
Nov 24*	at Georgia State	L 61–85	0–1	GSU Sports Arena; Atlanta, Georgia
Nov 26*	Savannah State	W 79–75	1–1	McAlister Field House; Charleston, South Carolina
Nov 28*	at Clemson	L 77–91	1–2	Littlejohn Coliseum; Clemson, South Carolina
Dec 1*	at College of Charleston	L 65–72	1–3	John Kresse Arena; Charleston, South Carolina
Dec 3*	Benedict	W 94–88 ^{OT}	2–3	McAlister Field House; Charleston, South Carolina
Dec 6*	Coastal Carolina	L 71–79	2–4	McAlister Field House; Charleston, South Carolina
Dec 30*	Nebraska	L 80–94 ^{OT}	2–5	McAlister Field House; Charleston, South Carolina
Jan 5	Marshall	L 81–90	2–6 (0–1)	McAlister Field House; Charleston, South Carolina
Jan 7	VMI	L 65–77	2–7 (0–2)	McAlister Field House; Charleston, South Carolina
Jan 12	at Appalachian State	L 74–84	2–8 (0–3)	Varsity Gymnasium; Boone, North Carolina
Jan 14	at No. 16 East Tennessee State	L 76–96	2–9 (0–4)	Memorial Center; Johnson City, Tennessee
Jan 16*	No. 12 Duke	L 50–83	2–10	McAlister Field House; Charleston, South Carolina
Jan 19	at Furman	L 57–78	2–11 (0–5)	Greenville Memorial Auditorium; Greenville, South Carolina
Jan 21*	Liberty	L 55–57	2–12	McAlister Field House; Charleston, South Carolina
Jan 23*	Georgia State	W 86–78	3–12	McAlister Field House; Charleston, South Carolina
Jan 26	Chattanooga	L 59–74	3–13 (0–6)	McAlister Field House; Charleston, South Carolina
Jan 28	Western Carolina	L 72–74	3–14 (0–7)	McAlister Field House; Charleston, South Carolina
Jan 31*	Youngstown State	W 102–101	4–14	McAlister Field House; Charleston, South Carolina
Feb 2	at VMI	L 67–85	4–15 (0–8)	Cameron Hall; Lexington, Virginia
Feb 4	at Marshall	L 78–90	4–16 (0–9)	Cam Henderson Center; Huntington, West Virginia
Feb 7	Newberry	W 92–78	5–16	McAlister Field House; Charleston, South Carolina
Feb 9	No. 13 East Tennessee State	L 69–101	5–17 (0–10)	McAlister Field House; Charleston, South Carolina
Feb 11	Appalachian State	L 69–84	5–18 (0–11)	McAlister Field House; Charleston, South Carolina
Feb 16	Furman	L 81–89 ^{2OT}	5–19 (0–12)	McAlister Field House; Charleston, South Carolina
Feb 18*	at No. 8 North Carolina	L 50–118	5–20	Dean Smith Center; Chapel Hill, North Carolina
Feb 23	at Chattanooga	L 71–83	5–21 (0–13)	McKenzie Arena; Chattanooga, Tennessee
Feb 25	at Western Carolina	W 89–76	6–21 (1–13)	Ramsey Center; Cullowhee, North Carolina
1991 Southern Conference men's basketball tournament
Mar 1	vs. No. 19 East Tennessee State	L 70–99	6–22	Asheville Civic Center; Asheville, North Carolina
*Non-conference game. (#) Tournament seedings in parentheses. All times are in Eastern Time.

== 1991–92 ==
1991–1992 The Citadel Bulldogs men's basketball
- Conference: Southern Conference
- Record: 10–18 (3–11 SoCon)
- Head coach: Randy Nesbit
- Home arena: McAlister Field House

1991–92 Southern Conference men's basketball standings
	Conf.				Overall
Team	W		L	PCT	W		L	PCT
East Tennessee State †	12	–	2	.857	24	–	7	.774
Chattanooga	12	–	2	.857	23	–	7	.767
Furman	9	–	5	.643	17	–	11	.607
Appalachian State	9	–	5	.643	15	–	14	.517
Western Carolina	5	–	9	.357	11	–	17	.393
Marshall	3	–	11	.214	7	–	22	.241
VMI	3	–	11	.214	10	–	18	.357
The Citadel	3	–	11	.214	10	–	18	.357
† 1992 SoCon Tournament winner As of April 30, 1992; Rankings from AP poll

Date time, TV	Opponent	Result	Record	Site city, state
Nov 22*	Barton	W 77–60	1–0	McAlister Field House; Charleston, South Carolina
Nov 24*	at No. 8 North Carolina	L 58–97	1–1	Dean Smith Center; Chapel Hill, North Carolina
Nov 25*	at No. 22 Wake Forest	L 57–97	1–2	LJVM Coliseum; Winston-Salem, North Carolina
Nov 29*	vs. Army; Weber State Military Classic	W 59–53	2–2	Dee Events Center; Ogden, Utah
Nov 30*	Weber State; Weber State Military Classic	L 74–108	2–3	Dee Events Center; Ogden, Utah
Dec 2*	at Nebraska	L 61–84	2–4	Bob Devaney Sports Center; Lincoln, Nebraska
Dec 5*	College of Charleston	L 60–63	2–5	McAlister Field House; Charleston, South Carolina
Dec 9*	Winthrop	W 82–57	3–5	McAlister Field House; Charleston, South Carolina
Dec 14*	Cabrini	W 69–47	4–5	McAlister Field House; Charleston, South Carolina
Dec 18*	at No. 20 Alabama	L 67–107	4–6	Coleman Coliseum; Tuscaloosa, Alabama
Jan 11	Appalachian State	W 80–72	5–6 (1–0)	McAlister Field House; Charleston, South Carolina
Jan 13	East Tennessee State	L 60–79	5–7 (1–1)	McAlister Field House; Charleston, South Carolina
Jan 18	Furman	L 65–85	5–8 (1–2)	McAlister Field House; Charleston, South Carolina
Jan 20*	Barry	W 75–72	6–8	McAlister Field House; Charleston, South Carolina
Jan 25	at Chattanooga	L 76–93	6–9 (1–3)	McKenzie Arena; Chattanooga, Tennessee
Jan 27	at Western Carolina	L 77–88	6–10 (1–4)	Ramsey Center; Cullowhee, North Carolina
Feb 1	VMI	W 66–60	7–10 (2–4)	McAlister Field House; Charleston, South Carolina
Feb 3	Marshall	L 67–75	7–11 (2–5)	McAlister Field House; Charleston, South Carolina
Feb 8	at East Tennessee State	L 88–107	7–12 (2–6)	Memorial Center; Johnson City, Tennessee
Feb 10	at Appalachian State	L 65–78	7–13 (2–7)	Varsity Gymnasium; Boone, North Carolina
Feb 15	at Furman	W 85–78	8–13 (3–7)	Greenville Memorial Auditorium; Greenville, South Carolina
Feb 17*	at UNC Greensboro	W 73–60	9–13	Fleming Gymnasium; Greensboro, North Carolina
Feb 19*	Samford	W 73–67	10–13	McAlister Field House; Charleston, South Carolina
Feb 22	Western Carolina	L 69–89	10–14 (3–8)	McAlister Field House; Charleston, South Carolina
Feb 24	Chattanooga	L 80–83 ^{OT}	10–15 (3–9)	McAlister Field House; Charleston, South Carolina
Feb 29	at Marshall	L 77–82	10–16 (3–10)	Cam Henderson Center; Huntington, West Virginia
Mar 2	at VMI	L 60–64	10–17 (3–11)	Cameron Hall; Lexington, Virginia
1992 Southern Conference men's basketball tournament
Mar 6	vs. East Tennessee State	L 55–89	10–18	Asheville Civic Center; Asheville, North Carolina
*Non-conference game. (#) Tournament seedings in parentheses. All times are in Eastern Time.

== 1992–93 ==
1992–1993 The Citadel Bulldogs men's basketball
- Conference: Southern Conference
- Record: 10–17 (8–10 SoCon)
- Head coach: Pat Dennis
- Home arena: McAlister Field House

1992–93 Southern Conference men's basketball standings
	Conf.				Overall
Team	W		L	PCT	W		L	PCT
Chattanooga †	16	–	2	.889	26	–	7	.788
East Tennessee State	12	–	6	.667	19	–	10	.655
Georgia Southern	12	–	6	.667	19	–	9	.679
Marshall	11	–	7	.611	16	–	11	.593
Davidson	10	–	8	.556	14	–	14	.500
The Citadel	8	–	10	.444	10	–	17	.370
Appalachian State	8	–	10	.444	13	–	15	.464
Furman	8	–	10	.444	11	–	17	.393
VMI	3	–	15	.167	5	–	22	.185
Western Carolina	2	–	16	.111	6	–	21	.222
† 1993 SoCon Tournament winner As of April 30, 1993; Rankings from AP poll

Date time, TV	Opponent	Result	Record	Site city, state
Dec 2*	Charleston Southern	W 59–54	1–0	McAlister Field House; Charleston, South Carolina
Dec 5*	at William & Mary	W 68–2 ^{OT}	1–1	Kaplan Arena; Williamsburg, Virginia
Dec 7*	at No. 25 Nebraska	L 46–86	1–2	Bob Devaney Sports Center; Lincoln, Nebraska
Dec 13*	at Winthrop	L 70–91	1–3	Winthrop Coliseum; Rock Hill, South Carolina
Dec 19*	at Clemson	L 54–76	1–4	Littlejohn Coliseum; Clemson, South Carolina
Jan 2*	at Samford	L 67–73	1–5	Seibert Hall; Birmingham, Alabama
Jan 5	Georgia Southern	L 58–66	1–6 (0–1)	McAlister Field House; Charleston, South Carolina
Jan 9	East Tennessee State	L 69–85	1–7 (0–2)	McAlister Field House; Charleston, South Carolina
Jan 10	Appalachian State	L 53–69	1–8 (0–3)	McAlister Field House; Charleston, South Carolina
Jan 16	at VMI	L 74–76	1–9 (0–4)	Cameron Hall; Lexington, Virginia
Jan 17	at Marshall	L 50–62	1–10 (0–5)	Cam Henderson Center; Huntington, West Virginia
Jan 20	at Davidson	L 70–80	1–11 (0–6)	John M. Belk Arena; Davidson, North Carolina
Jan 23	Western Carolina	W 83–73	2–11 (1–6)	McAlister Field House; Charleston, South Carolina
Jan 24	Chattanooga	L 62–95	2–12 (1–7)	McAlister Field House; Charleston, South Carolina
Jan 27	at Furman	W 63–62	3–12 (2–7)	Greenville Memorial Auditorium; Greenville, South Carolina
Jan 30	at Georgia Southern	L 73–81	3–13 (2–8)	Hanner Fieldhouse; Statesboro, Georgia
Feb 6	Furman	W 86–78	4–13 (3–8)	McAlister Field House; Charleston, South Carolina
Feb 7	Davidson	W 68–58	5–13 (4–8)	McAlister Field House; Charleston, South Carolina
Feb 10*	UNC Greensboro	W 53–47	6–13	McAlister Field House; Charleston, South Carolina
Feb 13	at Appalachian State	W 75–71	7–13 (5–8)	Varsity Gymnasium; Boone, North Carolina
Feb 14	at East Tennessee State	L 54–76	7–14 (5–9)	Memorial Center; Johnson City, Tennessee
Feb 20	Marshall	W 68–52	8–14 (6–9)	McAlister Field House; Charleston, South Carolina
Feb 21	VMI	W 69–53	9–14 (7–9)	McAlister Field House; Charleston, South Carolina
Feb 25*	at College of Charleston	L 53–55	9–15	John Kresse Arena; Charleston, South Carolina
Feb 27	at Chattanooga	L 72–95	9–16 (7–10)	McKenzie Arena; Chattanooga, Tennessee
Feb 28	at Western Carolina	W 79–70	10–16 (8–10)	Ramsey Center; Cullowhee, North Carolina
1993 Southern Conference men's basketball tournament
Mar 4	vs. Georgia Southern	L 41–72	10–17	Asheville Civic Center; Asheville, North Carolina
*Non-conference game. (#) Tournament seedings in parentheses. All times are in Eastern Time.

== 1993–94 ==
1993–1994 The Citadel Bulldogs men's basketball
- Conference: Southern Conference
- Record: 11–16 (6–12 SoCon)
- Head coach: Pat Dennis
- Home arena: McAlister Field House

1993–94 Southern Conference men's basketball standings
	Conf.				Overall
Team	W		L	PCT	W		L	PCT
Chattanooga †	14	–	4	.778	23	–	7	.767
Davidson	13	–	5	.722	22	–	8	.733
East Tennessee State	13	–	5	.722	16	–	14	.533
Appalachian State	12	–	6	.667	16	–	11	.593
Georgia Southern	9	–	9	.500	14	–	14	.500
Western Carolina	8	–	10	.444	12	–	16	.429
Marshall	7	–	11	.389	9	–	18	.333
The Citadel	6	–	12	.333	11	–	16	.407
Furman	6	–	12	.333	10	–	18	.357
VMI	2	–	16	.111	5	–	23	.179
† 1994 SoCon Tournament winner As of April 30, 1994; Rankings from AP poll

Date time, TV	Opponent	Result	Record	Site city, state
Nov 29*	Emory	W 101–49	1–0	McAlister Field House; Charleston, South Carolina
Dec 1*	at No. 6 Duke	L 63–78	1–1	Cameron Indoor Stadium; Durham, North Carolina
Dec 4*	William & Mary	W 78–73	2–1	McAlister Field House; Charleston, South Carolina
Dec 9*	at Charleston Southern	W 85–83	3–1	CSU Field House; North Charleston, South Carolina
Dec 18*	at Clemson	L 64–76	3–2	Littlejohn Coliseum; Clemson, South Carolina
Dec 29*	UNC Greensboro	W 63–46	4–2	McAlister Field House; Charleston, South Carolina
Jan 5	at Georgia Southern	L 78–81	4–3 (0–1)	Hanner Fieldhouse; Statesboro, Georgia
Jan 8	at East Tennessee State	L 54–70	4–4 (0–2)	Memorial Center; Johnson City, Tennessee
Jan 10	at Appalachian State	L 70–81	4–5 (0–3)	Varsity Gymnasium; Boone, North Carolina
Jan 15	VMI	W 63–50	5–5 (1–3)	McAlister Field House; Charleston, South Carolina
Jan 17	Marshall	L 79–83 ^{OT}	5–6 (1–4)	McAlister Field House; Charleston, South Carolina
Jan 19	Davidson	W 68–61	6–6 (2–4)	McAlister Field House; Charleston, South Carolina
Jan 22	at Western Carolina	W 71–67	7–6 (3–4)	Ramsey Center; Cullowhee, North Carolina
Jan 24	at Chattanooga	L 74–79	7–7 (3–5)	McKenzie Arena; Chattanooga, Tennessee
Jan 26	Furman	W 65–64	8–7 (4–5)	McAlister Field House; Charleston, South Carolina
Jan 29	Georgia Southern	L 62–65	8–8 (4–6)	McAlister Field House; Charleston, South Carolina
Feb 1*	Erskine	W 80–64	9–8	McAlister Field House; Charleston, South Carolina
Feb 5	at Furman	L 63–71	9–9 (4–7)	Greenville Memorial Auditorium; Greenville, South Carolina
Feb 7	at Davidson	L 63–76	9–10 (4–8)	John M. Belk Arena; Davidson, North Carolina
Feb 10*	College of Charleston	L 49–51	9–11	McAlister Field House; Charleston, South Carolina
Feb 12	Appalachian State	W 78–65	10–11 (5–8)	McAlister Field House; Charleston, South Carolina
Feb 14	East Tennessee State	L 70–82 ^{OT}	10–12 (5–9)	McAlister Field House; Charleston, South Carolina
Feb 19	at Marshall	L 64–85	10–13 (5–10)	Cam Henderson Center; Huntington, West Virginia
Feb 21	at VMI	W 80–57	11–13 (6–10)	Cameron Hall; Lexington, Virginia
Feb 26	Chattanooga	L 65–83	11–14 (6–11)	McAlister Field House; Charleston, South Carolina
Feb 28	Western Carolina	L 51–58	11–15 (6–12)	McAlister Field House; Charleston, South Carolina
1994 Southern Conference men's basketball tournament
Mar 3	vs. Furman	L 70–75	6–12	Asheville Civic Center; Asheville, North Carolina
*Non-conference game. (#) Tournament seedings in parentheses. All times are in Eastern Time.
