= 1989–90 East Tennessee State Buccaneers men's basketball team =

American college basketball season

1989–90 East Tennessee State Buccaneers men's basketball
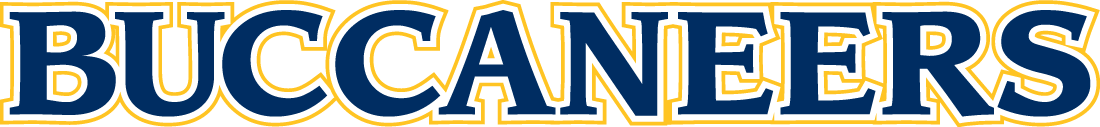

SoCon Regular Season champions SoCon tournament champions

NCAA tournament, first round
- Conference: Southern Conference
- Record: 27–7 (12–2 SoCon)
- Head coach: Les Robinson (5th season)
- Assistant coach: Alan LeForce
- Home arena: ETSU/Mountain States Health; Alliance Athletic Center

1989–90 Southern Conference men's basketball standings
	Conf.				Overall
Team	W		L	PCT	W		L	PCT
East Tennessee State †	12	–	2	.857	27	–	7	.794
Marshall	9	–	5	.643	15	–	13	.536
Appalachian State	8	–	6	.571	19	–	11	.633
VMI	7	–	7	.500	14	–	15	.483
Chattanooga	7	–	7	.500	14	–	14	.500
The Citadel	5	–	9	.357	12	–	16	.429
Furman	5	–	9	.357	15	–	16	.484
Western Carolina	3	–	11	.214	10	–	18	.357
† SoCon Tournament winner As of April 30, 1990; Rankings from AP poll

The 1989–90 East Tennessee State Buccaneers basketball team represented East Tennessee State University during the 1989-90 NCAA Division I men's basketball season. The team was led by head coach Les Robinson. The Bucs finished the season 27–7 and 12–2 in Southern Conference play to finish in first place after the regular season. They won the Southern Conference tournament championship in Asheville to receive the automatic berth to the NCAA tournament as the No. 13 seed in the Southeast region. They lost to No. 4 seed, and eventual Final Four participant, Georgia Tech, 99–83 in the first round.

== Roster ==
1989–90 East Tennessee State Buccaneers men's basketball team
Players
Coaches

Pos.	#	Name	Height	Weight	Year	Hometown
C	11	Greg Dennis	6 ft 11 in (2.11 m)	—	Jr
PG	22	Keith Jennings	5 ft 7 in (1.7 m)	155 lb (70 kg)	Jr	Culpeper, Virginia
F	24	Calvin Talford	6 ft 4 in (1.93 m)	—	So

Head coach

- Les Robinson

Assistant coach(es)

- Alan LeForce

Legend

- (C) Team captain
- (S) Suspended
- (I) Ineligible
- (W) Walk-on
- Injured
- Current redshirt

== Schedule and results ==
Date time, TV	Rank^{#}	Opponent^{#}	Result	Record	Site city, state
Regular season
Nov 25, 1989*		Charleston	W 120–83	1–0	Memorial Center (6,177); Johnson City, Tennessee
Nov 28, 1989*		at Tennessee	W 83–70	1–1	Thompson-Boling Arena (23,108); Knoxville, Tennessee
Dec 2, 1989*		Carson–Newman	W 91–65	2–1	Memorial Center (6,780); Johnson City, Tennessee
Dec 4, 1989*		Newberry	W 125–74	3–1	Memorial Center (5,287); Johnson City, Tennessee
Dec 8, 1989*		vs. Boston University; Montana Tournament	L 73–78	4–1	Harry Adams Field House (3,610); Missoula, Montana
Dec 9, 1989*		vs. Monmouth; Montana Tournament	W 79–67	5–1	Harry Adams Field House (3,500); Missoula, Montana
Dec 19, 1989*		at No. 15 NC State	W 92–82	6–1	Reynolds Coliseum (11,500); Raleigh, North Carolina
Dec 22, 1989*		vs. East Carolina; Chaminade Christmas Tournament	W 86–80	7–1	Neal S. Blaisdell Center (300); Honolulu, Hawaii
Dec 23, 1989*		vs. Maryland; Chaminade Christmas Tournament	L 86–91	7–2	Neal S. Blaisdell Center (300); Honolulu, Hawaii
Dec 24, 1989*		at Chaminade; Chaminade Christmas Tournament	W 83–69	8–2	Neal S. Blaisdell Center (300); Honolulu, Hawaii
Dec 30, 1989*		at No. 16 UCLA	L 66–115	8–3	Pauley Pavilion (7,466); Los Angeles, California
Jan 3, 1990*		Liberty	W 107–91	9–3	Memorial Center (5,125); Johnson City, Tennessee
Jan 6, 1990		at Western Carolina	W 92–73	10–3 (1–0)	Ramsey Center (2,041); Cullowhee, North Carolina
Jan 8, 1990		at Chattanooga	W 75–70	11–3 (2–0)	McKenzie Arena (5,008); Chattanooga, Tennessee
Jan 10, 1990*		at Wake Forest	L 69–73	11–4	Lawrence Joel Coliseum (7,150); Winston-Salem, North Carolina
Jan 13, 1990		Furman	W 94–65	12–4 (3–0)	Memorial Center (8,046); Johnson City, Tennessee
Jan 15, 1990		The Citadel	W 92–57	13–4 (4–0)	Memorial Center (6,240); Johnson City, Tennessee
Jan 17, 1990*		at Drake	W 86–78	14–4	Veterans Memorial Auditorium (4,059); Des Moines, Iowa
Jan 20, 1990		at Appalachian State	W 96–94	15–4 (5–0)	Varsity Gymnasium (8,465); Boone, North Carolina
Jan 27, 1990		at VMI	L 77–78	15–5 (5–1)	Cameron Hall (2,475); Lexington, Virginia
Jan 29, 1990		at Marshall	W 99–88	16–5 (6–1)	Cam Henderson Center (7,712); Huntington, West Virginia
Feb 3, 1990		Chattanooga	W 93–73	17–5 (7–1)	Memorial Center (9,940); Johnson City, Tennessee
Feb 5, 1990		Western Carolina	W 99–88	18–5 (8–1)	Memorial Center (6,348); Johnson City, Tennessee
Feb 8, 1990*		at Liberty	W 64–49	19–5	Vines Center (2,950); Lynchburg, Virginia
Feb 10, 1990		at The Citadel	W 87–86	20–5 (9–1)	McAlister Field House (2,138); Charleston, South Carolina
Feb 12, 1990		at Furman	L 97–100 ^{OT}	20–6 (9–2)	Greenville Memorial Auditorium (3,121); Greenville, South Carolina
Feb 17, 1990		Appalachian State	W 98–82	21–6 (10–2)	Memorial Center (10,475); Johnson City, Tennessee
Feb 21, 1990*		Drake	W 86–71	22–6	Memorial Center (6,148); Johnson City, Tennessee
Feb 24, 1990		Marshall	W 84–74	23–6 (11–2)	Memorial Center (10,150); Johnson City, Tennessee
Feb 26, 1990		VMI	W 100–81	24–6 (12–2)	Memorial Center (7,624); Johnson City, Tennessee
SoCon tournament
Mar 2, 1990*		vs. Western Carolina; SoCon Tournament Quarterfinal	W 75–60	25–6	Asheville Civic Center; Asheville, North Carolina
Mar 3, 1990*		vs. VMI; SoCon Tournament Semifinal	W 99–94	26–6	Asheville Civic Center; Asheville, North Carolina
Mar 4, 1990*		vs. Appalachian State; SoCon tournament championship	W 96–75	27–6	Asheville Civic Center; Asheville, North Carolina
NCAA tournament
Mar 15, 1990*	(13 SE)	vs. (4 SE) No. 9 Georgia Tech; First Round	L 83–99	27–7	Thompson-Boling Arena; Knoxville, Tennessee
*Non-conference game. ^{#}Rankings from AP Poll. (#) Tournament seedings in parentheses. SE=Southeast. All times are in Eastern Time.

== Awards and honors ==
- Keith Jennings – SoCon Player of the Year (Coaches)
