= 1990 Southern Conference men's basketball tournament =

- Classification: Division I
- Season: 1989–90
- Teams: 8
- Site: Asheville Civic Center; Asheville, NC
- Champions: East Tennessee State (2nd title)
- Winning coach: Les Robinson (2nd title)
- MVP: Keith Jennings (East Tennessee State)

1989–90 Southern Conference men's basketball standings
	Conf.				Overall
Team	W		L	PCT	W		L	PCT
East Tennessee State †	12	–	2	.857	27	–	7	.794
Marshall	9	–	5	.643	15	–	13	.536
Appalachian State	8	–	6	.571	19	–	11	.633
VMI	7	–	7	.500	14	–	15	.483
Chattanooga	7	–	7	.500	14	–	14	.500
The Citadel	5	–	9	.357	12	–	16	.429
Furman	5	–	9	.357	15	–	16	.484
Western Carolina	3	–	11	.214	10	–	18	.357
† SoCon Tournament winner As of April 30, 1990; Rankings from AP poll

The 1990 Southern Conference men's basketball tournament took place from March 2–4, 1990 at the Asheville Civic Center in Asheville, North Carolina. The East Tennessee State Buccaneers, led by head coach Les Robinson, won their second Southern Conference title and received the automatic berth to the 1990 NCAA tournament.

== Format ==
All of the conference's eight members were eligible for the tournament. Teams were seeded based on conference winning percentage. The tournament used a preset bracket consisting of three rounds.

== Bracket ==
Quarterfinals; March 2
1	East Tennessee State	75
8	Western Carolina	60
4	VMI	83
5	Chattanooga	69
2	Marshall	77^{OT}
7	Furman	82
3	Appalachian State	86
6	The Citadel	71

Semifinals; March 3
1	East Tennessee State	99
4	VMI	84
3	Appalachian State	79
7	Furman	62

Finals; March 4
1	East Tennessee State	96
3	Appalachian State	75

== See also ==
- List of Southern Conference men's basketball champions
