= Courtney Pigram =

American basketball player (born 1985)

Personal information
- Born: November 14, 1985 (age 41) Memphis, Tennessee
- Listed height: 6 ft 1 in (1.85 m)
- Listed weight: 195 lb (88 kg)

Career information
- High school: White Station (Memphis, Tennessee)
- College: East Tennessee State (2005–2009)
- NBA draft: 2009: undrafted
- Playing career: 2009–present
- Position: Guard

Career history
- 2009–2010: Andorra
- 2011: Heilongjiang Zhaozhou Feng Shen
- 2011–2012: Maine Red Claws
- 2012–2013: S.Oliver Baskets
- 2013: Phantoms Braunschweig
- 2014: Ilysiakos
- 2014–2015: Al Arabi
- 2015–2016: Shahrdari Gorgan
- 2016: Al-Hilal
- 2016–2017: Petrolina AEK Larnaca
- 2017–2018: Tadamon Zouk
- 2018–2019: Enosis Neon Paralimni
- 2019–2021: APOP Paphos
- 2021–2023: AEL Limassol

Career highlights
- Cypriot League All-Star (2018); Atlantic Sun Player of the Year (2007); First-team All-Atlantic Sun (2007); Third-team All-Atlantic Sun (2006); AP Honorable mention All-American (2007)

Courtney Pigram (born November 14, 1985) is an American professional basketball player.

== Early life and college ==
Pigram grew up in Memphis, Tennessee. While he was in high school, his father died. He had to work to attend East Tennessee State University, where he scored 2,041 points in his four years at the school. He left ETSU as the third leading scorer in school history behind Tim Smith and Greg Dennis. Pigram was named the 2007 Atlantic Sun Conference Men's Basketball Player of the Year after leading East Tennessee State University to the regular season Atlantic Sun Conference title.

== Professional ==
Going undrafted in the 2009 NBA draft, Pigram played in Spain for BC Andorra and in the People's Republic of China with Heilongjiang Zhaozhou Feng Shen of the second tier National Basketball League before being drafted in the 5th round of the 2011 NBA Development League Draft by the Idaho Stampede. Pigram was cut during training camp with the Stampede. On December 9, 2011, Pigram was claimed by the Maine Red Claws from the league Available Player Pool. He was claimed primarily because five Red Claws players were signed to training camp contracts with NBA teams. Through three games with Maine, he was leading the NBA Development League in points per game with 27. In his first professional game in the United States, Pigram scored a team high 33, including seven three-pointers, in a 103–81 win over the Canton Charge. Through six games, he was leading the team in points per game with 22.5. Pigram stayed with the Red Claws following the return of the NBA training camp players.

In February 2013, he signed with the Phantoms Braunschweig of the German Basketball Bundesliga. In January 2014, he signed with Ilysiakos of the Greek Basket League for the rest of the season.

In February 2015, Pigram signed with Shahrdari Gorgan of the Iranian Basketball Super League.
