= 1994 Southern Conference men's basketball tournament =

- Classification: Division I
- Season: 1993–94
- Teams: 10
- Site: Asheville Civic Center; Asheville, NC
- Champions: Chattanooga (6th title)
- Winning coach: Mack McCarthy (3rd title)

1993–94 Southern Conference men's basketball standings
	Conf.				Overall
Team	W		L	PCT	W		L	PCT
Chattanooga †	14	–	4	.778	23	–	7	.767
Davidson	13	–	5	.722	22	–	8	.733
East Tennessee State	13	–	5	.722	16	–	14	.533
Appalachian State	12	–	6	.667	16	–	11	.593
Georgia Southern	9	–	9	.500	14	–	14	.500
Western Carolina	8	–	10	.444	12	–	16	.429
Marshall	7	–	11	.389	9	–	18	.333
The Citadel	6	–	12	.333	11	–	16	.407
Furman	6	–	12	.333	10	–	18	.357
VMI	2	–	16	.111	5	–	23	.179
† 1994 SoCon Tournament winner As of April 30, 1994; Rankings from AP poll

The 1994 Southern Conference men's basketball tournament took place from March 3–6, 1994 at the Asheville Civic Center in Asheville, North Carolina. The Chattanooga Mocs, led by head coach Mack McCarthy, won their sixth Southern Conference title and received the automatic berth to the 1994 NCAA tournament.

== Format ==
All of the conference's ten members were eligible for the tournament. Teams were seeded based on conference winning percentage. The tournament used a preset bracket consisting of four rounds, the first of which featured two games, with the winners moving on to the quarterfinal round. This was the last year in which the conference did not utilize a divisional format, which was implemented the following season.

== Bracket ==
First round March 3
8	The Citadel	70
9	Furman	75
7	Marshall	62
10	VMI	84

Quarterfinals; March 4
1	Chattanooga	85
9	Furman	81
4	Appalachian State	60
5	Georgia Southern	85
2	Davidson	71
10	VMI	61
3	East Tennessee St.	78
6	Western Carolina	79

Semifinals; March 5
1	Chattanooga	99*
5	Georgia Southern	91
2	Davidson	93
6	Western Carolina	89

Finals; March 6
1	Chattanooga	65
2	Davidson	64

* Overtime game

== See also ==
- List of Southern Conference men's basketball champions
