= Alan LeForce =

American basketball coach

Biographical details
- Born: February 27, 1935 (age 91); Wofford, Kentucky, U.S.

Playing career
- 1953–1957: Cumberland College

Coaching career (HC unless noted)

Men's basketball
- 1958–1961: Williamsburg HS
- 1961–1962: Cumberland College (asst.)
- 1963–1967: Williamsburg HS
- 1968–1970: Furman (asst.)
- 1970–1979: College of Charleston
- 1980–1985: Coastal Academy HS
- 1985–1986: East Cooper HS
- 1986–1990: East Tennessee State (asst.)
- 1990–1996: East Tennessee State

Women's basketball
- 1997–2013: Coastal Carolina

Administrative career (AD unless noted)
- 1970–1979: College of Charleston
- 1980–1985: Coastal Academy (HS)
- 1996–1997: East Tennessee State (asst.)

Head coaching record
- Overall: 132–108 (.550) (NAIA); 336–297 (.531) (Division I); 468–405 (.536) (Overall)
- Tournaments: 1–2 (NCAA Division I)

Accomplishments and honors

Championships
- 2× SoCon regular season (1991, 1992); 2× SoCon Tournament (1991, 1992)

Awards
- Big South Coach of the Year (1999)

Alan LeForce (born February 27, 1935) is an American former college basketball coach and athletic director. He served as head coach for the men's teams at the College of Charleston (1970–79) and East Tennessee State University (1990–96), and as head coach for the women's team at Coastal Carolina University (1997–2013). He is one of a select few coaches to win over 100 games at four different levels of basketball (high school, NAIA, Division I men's, and Division I women's).

== Early life ==
LeForce was born and raised in Wofford, Kentucky and attended Williamsburg High School in nearby Williamsburg. He played basketball at Cumberland College and graduated in 1957 after completing his degree in two years.

== Coaching career ==
=== High School and Assistant Coaching ===
LeForce began coaching in 1958, after returning to his alma mater Williamsburg High School to coach the varsity boys' basketball team from 1958 to 1961, and again from 1963 to 1967. He left for one year to take an assistant coaching job at Cumberland College in 1962, and left again for an assistant position under Frank Selvy at Furman from 1968 to 1970.

=== College of Charleston ===
In 1970 LeForce was hired as the head coach of the College of Charleston's men's basketball team, as well as the program's athletic director. Through nine seasons LeForce coached the Cougars to a 132–108 record at the NAIA level, highlighted by four District 6 Playoff appearances and a 20-win season in 1974–75.

=== South Carolina High Schools ===
He left Charleston in 1979 to lead the varsity boys' team at Coastal Academy High School in Conway, South Carolina. In five seasons LeForce coached to a 125–15 record and won two South Carolina Independent School State Championships. He left the Coastal Academy to coach at East Cooper High School in Mount Pleasant during the 1985–86 season.

=== East Tennessee State ===
LeForce next served as an assistant coach under Les Robinson at East Tennessee State from 1986 to 1990. As an assistant, LeForce was vital in the Buccaneers' back-to-back NCAA Tournament appearances in 1989 and 1990. After Robinson's departure to coach the NC State Wolfpack, LeForce was promoted to head coach.

In LeForce's first season as head coach, the 1990–91 Buccaneers won the SoCon Tournament and advanced to the First Round of the 1991 NCAA Tournament. LeForce's 1991–92 squad repeated as SoCon Champions, and went on to upset #3 seed Arizona 87–80 in the First Round of the 1992 NCAA Tournament. Their season ended in the Second Round after losing 90–102 to Michigan, the National Runner-Up led by the Fab Five.

Across six seasons, LeForce coached the East Tennessee State men's team to a 108–70 record.

=== Coastal Carolina ===
LeForce served as the head coach of the Coastal Carolina Chanticleers women's team from 1997 to 2013, making him the longest tenured coach in program history, and the winningest coach in program history with a 228–227 record.

He entered the annals of basketball history on February 5, 2011, when he won his 200th game at Coastal Carolina, a 47–34 victory over Presbyterian, becoming the only head coach to accumulate 200 wins as a Division I men's and women's head coach.

== Head coaching record ==
Record table
Season	Team	Overall	Conference	Standing	Postseason
College of Charleston Cougars (NAIA Independent) (1970–1979)
1970–71	College of Charleston	11–16			
1971–72	College of Charleston	11–12			
1972–73	College of Charleston	16–10			
1973–74	College of Charleston	18–9		District 6 Quarterfinal	
1974–75	College of Charleston	20–9		District 6 Semifinal	
1975–76	College of Charleston	17–10		District 6 Quarterfinal	
1976–77	College of Charleston	13–12			
1977–78	College of Charleston	14–14		District 6 Quarterfinal	
1978–79	College of Charleston	12–16			
College of Charleston:		132–108 (.550)			
East Tennessee State Buccaneers (Southern Conference) (1990–1996)
1990–91	East Tennessee State	28–5	11–3	1st	NCAA First Round
1991–92	East Tennessee State	24–7	12–2	1st	NCAA Second Round
1992–93	East Tennessee State	19–10	12–6	2nd	
1993–94	East Tennessee State	16–14	13–5	2nd	
1994–95	East Tennessee State	14–14	9–5	2nd (North)	
1995–96	East Tennessee State	7–20	3–11	T–5th (North)	
East Tennessee State:		108–70 (.607)	60–32 (.652)		
Coastal Carolina Chanticleers (Big South Conference) (1997–2013)
1997–98	Coastal Carolina	9–18	5–7	3rd	
1998–99	Coastal Carolina	18–10	6–4	2nd	
1999–00	Coastal Carolina	20–10	9–5	3rd	
2000–01	Coastal Carolina	14–13	8–6	5th	
2001–02	Coastal Carolina	11–18	5–9	7th	
2002–03	Coastal Carolina	13–15	6–8	5th	
2003–04	Coastal Carolina	13–15	6–8	6th	
2004–05	Coastal Carolina	9–18	4–10	7th	
2005–06	Coastal Carolina	18–10	7–7	3rd	
2006–07	Coastal Carolina	18–11	9–5	5th	
2007–08	Coastal Carolina	16–12	4–8	5th	
2008–09	Coastal Carolina	16–14	8–8	5th	
2009–10	Coastal Carolina	17–13	7–9	5th	
2010–11	Coastal Carolina	10–19	4–12	8th	
2011–12	Coastal Carolina	13–15	6–12	8th	
2012–13	Coastal Carolina	13–16	8–10	8th	
Coastal Carolina:		228–227 (.501)	102–128 (.443)		
Total:		468–405 (.536)			
National champion Postseason invitational champion Conference regular season champion Conference regular season and conference tournament champion Division regular season champion Division regular season and conference tournament champion Conference tournament champion
