= Boo Carter =

American football player (born 2005)

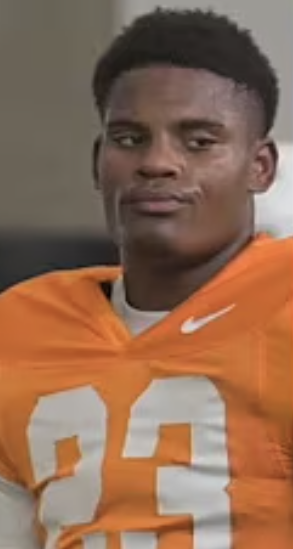
- Carter in 2024

No. 6 – Colorado Buffaloes
- Position: Cornerback
- Class: Junior

Personal information
- Born: October 9, 2005 (age 21); Chattanooga, Tennessee, U.S.
- Listed height: 5 ft 11 in (1.80 m)
- Listed weight: 200 lb (91 kg)

Career information
- High school: Bradley Central (Cleveland, Tennessee)
- College: Tennessee (2024–2025); Colorado (2026–present)
- Stats at ESPN

Orlando "Boo" Carter (born October 9, 2005) is an American college football cornerback for the Colorado Buffaloes. He previously played for the Tennessee Volunteers.

== Early life ==
Carter grew up in Chattanooga, Tennessee and attended Chattanooga Christian School before transferring to Bradley Central High School in Cleveland, Tennessee for his senior year. As a senior he was named Mr. Football Tennessee, as the state's top high school player. He was rated as a four-star recruit, the 3rd ranked athlete, and the 111th overall player in the class of 2024, holding offers from schools such as Colorado, Michigan, and Tennessee. Ultimately, Carter committed to play college football for the Tennessee Volunteers.

== College career ==
Heading into the 2024 season, Carter earned a starting spot for Tennessee heading into week one. He notched two tackles in their season-opening win over Chattanooga. In week seven, Carter was named the Southeastern Conference (SEC) freshman of the week after notching seven tackles with one and a half being for a loss, and a sack in a win over Florida. In week eight, late in the fourth quarter, he caused a 15-yard unsportsmanlike conduct penalty on receiver Kendrick Law, which set up a fourth and long which would not be converted, helping the Volunteers upset rival Alabama. In Tennessee's ninth game, against Mississippi State, Carter recorded his first college interception in the victory.

On November 16, 2025, Carter was released from the Tennessee football team. Carter had missed the contest between New Mexico State the previous day, with coach Josh Heupel having remarked "At the end of the day, there's a standard you've got to meet to be in that locker room," in media availability following the game. The previous offseason, Carter had been absent in "numerous team activities," and subsequently confronted by team leaders.
