= Terrence Oglesby =

American-Norwegian basketball player

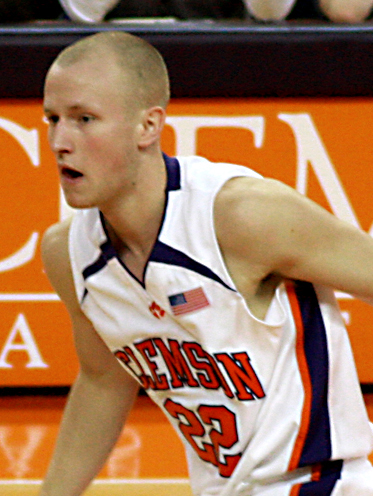
- Oglesby playing for Clemson

Free agent
- Position: Shooting guard

Personal information
- Born: March 12, 1988 (age 38) Kongsberg, Norway
- Listed height: 6 ft 2 in (1.88 m)
- Listed weight: 190 lb (86 kg)

Career information
- High school: Bradley Central (Cleveland, Tennessee)
- College: Clemson (2007–2009)
- NBA draft: 2010: undrafted
- Playing career: 2009–2017

Career history
- 2009: MBC Mykolaiv
- 2010–2011: Tarragona 2017
- 2011–2012: Sundsvall Dragons
- 2012: Eco Örebro
- 2012–2013: Borås Basket
- 2013–2014: Saint-Brieuc
- 2015: Rustavi
- 2015–2016: Iowa Energy
- 2016–2017: Umeå BBK

Terrence Rønnestad Oglesby (born March 12, 1988) is an American-Norwegian professional basketball player who last played for the Umeå BBK of the Swedish Basketligan. Before moving to Europe to play professionally, he had played college basketball for Clemson University. Born in Kongsberg, Norway, Oglesby holds dual citizenship with the United States and Norway.

== High school career ==
Oglesby played basketball at the Bradley Central High School in his hometown of Cleveland, Tennessee. He was selected to the All-Region team three times and received Most Valuable Player honors twice. He was selected to the Tennessee Sports Writers Association (TSWA) All-State boys basketball team as a junior and senior. Oglesby is the all-time leading scorer at Bradley Central with 2,256 career points. He was a finalist for the 2007 Tennessee Secondary School Athletic Association (TSSAA) Mr. Basketball Award at the class AAA level. Oglesby was the 26th-ranked shooting guard on Rivals.com's rankings for the high school class of 2007. He signed with Clemson along with Demontez Stitt and Jerai Grant, the latter of whom Oglesby played against in the Capital Classic all-star game.

== Collegiate career ==
As a freshman—in the 2007–08 season—Oglesby played 18.2 minutes per game and averaged 10.5 points per game; he was the team leader in three-point field goals made (85) and three-point field-goal accuracy (40.5%). He was a two-time Atlantic Coast Conference (ACC) Rookie-of-the-Week selection, the most selections received by a Clemson player since Cliff Hammonds was selected four times in the 2004–05 season. Oglesby was also named as Honorable Mention to the ACC All-Freshman Team. In his sophomore season (2008–09), Oglesby played in every game. He averaged 13.7 points per game and led the team in three-point field goals made and free throw percentage. On December 30, 2008, Oglesby scored a career-high 25 points, making 6 of 10 three-pointers, in a 98–87 Clemson victory over South Carolina.

== Professional career ==
On May 26, 2009, Oglesby announced that he had decided to forgo his final two seasons at Clemson and play professional basketball in Europe. Fifteen teams from Italy and Spain had been interested in signing Oglesby, who had not yet signed with an agent at the time of his departure from Clemson. Ultimately, he signed with NSB Napoli in the Italian Serie A. He later left Napoli before appearing in a game for them, going on to play in Ukraine and Spain during the 2009–10 season. He continued on in Spain and Sweden between 2010 and 2013, before moving to France and playing for Saint-Brieuc during the 2013–14 season.

In January 2015, Oglesby signed with Rustavi of the Georgian Superliga.

On October 31, 2015, Oglesby was acquired by the Iowa Energy of the NBA Development League following a successful tryout with the team. On January 26, he was waived by Iowa.

== International career ==
In 2008, Oglesby played for Norway at the FIBA Europe Under-20 Championship and was the leading scorer of the team's Division B with an average of 24.4 points per game. Norway finished in 11th place.

== Coaching career ==
After his final season in Umea, Sweden, Oglesby returned to Clemson University to finish his undergraduate degree in Communications while working with Brad Brownell and the Clemson Basketball program participating in video editing for team scouting and the practice squad. He also worked with players in individual workouts specializing in shooting. Clemson made the Sweet 16 in 2018. The following season Oglesby accepted a graduate assistant position under Brad Brownell and finished his Master's Degree in Athletic Leadership.

After the 2018-2019 season, Oglesby accepted a position at Carson Newman University as assistant coach which he would ultimately resign at Christmas due to family matters.

== Broadcasting career ==
Oglesby began working in television full time in the 2022-23 season. He works largely with ESPN, FOX, CBS Sports Network, and The Field of 68. He mostly covers the ACC for The ACC Network.
