= Tim Long (American football) =

American football player and coach (born 1963)

No. 68
- Position: Center

Personal information
- Born: April 20, 1963 (age 63); Cleveland, Tennessee, U.S.
- Listed height: 6 ft 6 in (1.98 m)
- Listed weight: 308 lb (140 kg)

Career information
- High school: Bradley Central (Cleveland)
- College: Memphis
- NFL draft: 1985: 3rd round, 66th overall pick

Career history
- Minnesota Vikings (1985–1986)*; San Francisco 49ers (1987)
- * Offseason or practice squad member only

Career NFL statistics
- Games played: 2
- Games started: 0
- Stats at Pro Football Reference

Timothy Joe Long (born April 20, 1963) is an American former professional football player and coach. He was selected by the Minnesota Vikings as a left tackle in 1985 and also played for the San Francisco 49ers of the National Football League (NFL) as a center in 1987. Also signed and played guard for the Indianapolis Colts in 1988.

== Football career ==
Long attended Bradley Central High School in Cleveland, Tennessee, graduating in 1981. He enrolled at Memphis State University, and played college football for the Memphis State Tigers. In 1984, he was named an honorable mention on the Associated Press All-America Team. Selected as a "Grid God" in US Magazine.

The Minnesota Vikings of the National Football League (NFL) selected Long in the third round, with the 66th overall selection, of the 1985 NFL draft. He played in preseason games for the Vikings, Indianapolis Colts, and San Francisco 49ers. In 1987, he played in three regular season games for the 49ers. His career ended prematurely due to injuries.

After his retirement from playing, Long volunteer coached the offensive line for Briarcrest Christian School for 9 seasons. He coached Michael Oher who was portrayed in the movie The Blind Side as well as both of his sons who later attended the University of Georgia on football scholarships.

== Personal life ==
Both of Long's sons, Austin & Hunter Long, played college football for the University of Georgia.
