= Zakee Wadood =

American professional basketball player (born 1981)

Personal information
- Born: October 14, 1981 (age 45)
- Listed height: 6 ft 6 in (1.98 m)
- Listed weight: 229 lb (104 kg)

Career information
- High school: Lonoke (Lonoke, Arkansas)
- College: East Tennessee State (2000–2004)
- NBA draft: 2004: undrafted
- Position: Small forward

Career highlights
- SoCon Player of the Year (2004); AP Honorable Mention All-American (2004); First-team All-SoCon (2004); Second-team All-SoCon (2003)

Zakee Wadood (born October 14, 1981) is an American former professional basketball player. After graduating from East Tennessee State University (ETSU) in 2004, Wadood played in leagues in Finland, Spain and Luxembourg.

== Playing career ==
=== High school ===
Wadood attended Lonoke High School in Lonoke, Arkansas between 1996–97 and 1999–2000. During his senior season he was the team captain and averaged 20.6 points, 10.0 rebounds and 4.5 blocks per game. He guided the school to their second consecutive state championship. For his prep career, Wadood was a three-time all-conference, two-time all-region, two-time all-state and one-time All-Arkansas team (which is different from "all-state"). He also played football for Lonoke High School.

=== College ===
During Wadood's four-year career playing for the ETSU Buccaneers between 2000–01 and 2003–04, he scored 1,382 career points. He also grabbed 822 rebounds, 246 steals and had 182 blocks. In his sophomore and junior seasons, the Southern Conference (SoCon) media voted him as a second team all-conference performer. In all three of his final seasons, the SoCon coaches chose him to their all-conference team, and in his final two years he was named to the All-SoCon tournament Team. Those two years, Wadood finished second and fourth, respectively, in steals per game in all of NCAA Division I. The Buccaneers also qualified for the NCAA tournament in his junior and senior seasons as well. After Wadood led ETSU to both SoCon regular and conference tournament championships in 2003–04 behind his season averages of 14.8 points, 8.0 rebounds, 2.8 steals and 2.8 blocks per game, he was chosen as the consensus SoCon Player of the Year. The Associated Press also named him an honorable mention All-American.

=== Professional ===
After college, Wadood was selected in the 2004 National Basketball Development League draft by the Arkansas RimRockers, although he never ended up playing with the team. He then began his professional career overseas which included stops in Finland (KTP, FoKoPo, and Componenta), Spain (Ourense), and Luxembourg (Black Star). Wadood also played briefly in the United States' World Basketball Association for the Bristol Crusaders.
