= Mike Smith (basketball, born 1987) =

American basketball player

Personal information
- Born: July 17, 1987 (age 39)
- Listed height: 6 ft 6 in (1.98 m)
- Listed weight: 225 lb (102 kg)

Career information
- High school: Van-Far (Vandalia, Missouri)
- College: East Tennessee State (2006–2011)
- NBA draft: 2011: undrafted
- Playing career: 2011–2019
- Position: Shooting guard

Career history
- 2011–2012: Eisbären Bremerhaven
- 2013–2014: Liège
- 2014–2015: Belfius Mons-Hainaut
- 2015–2017: Antwerp Giants
- 2017–2018: Brussels
- 2018–2019: Belfius Mons-Hainaut

Career highlights
- Atlantic Sun Player of the Year (2011); First-team All-Atlantic Sun (2011); AP honorable mention All-American (2011)

Michael Jay Smith (born July 17, 1987) is an American former professional basketball player who played mostly in the Belgian League. He was an All-American college player at the East Tennessee State University (ETSU).

== College career ==
Smith came to ETSU after a prolific career at Van-Far High school in Vandalia, Missouri. He scored 2,627 points in his high school career. As a freshman, Smith averaged 11 points per game and was named to the Atlantic Sun Conference All-Freshman team. After productive seasons as a sophomore and junior, Smith suffered a knee injury that limited his to only four games in what would have been his senior year. He was granted a medical redshirt and came back for the 2010–11 season.

Smith experienced his best season as a senior. He averaged 17.9 points and 6.8 rebounds per game and was named first team All-Conference and the Atlantic Sun Player of the Year. At the conclusion of the season, he was also named an honorable mention All-American by the Associated Press. For his ETSU career, Smith scored 1,783 points.

== Professional career ==
Smith was not drafted in the 2011 NBA draft. He instead signed with Eisbären Bremerhaven in Germany's Basketball Bundesliga. He averaged 8.3 points per game in his first professional season and led the team in three point shooting percentage. After being drafted by the Iowa Energy in the 2012 NBA Development League Draft, Smith missed the entire 2012–13 season with a wrist injury suffered in practice. For the 2013–14 season he signed with Liège Basket in Belgium. Smith averaged 16.6 points and 5.1 rebounds per game in the BLB. For the 2014–15 season he signed with Belfius Mons-Hainaut.

Smith was forced to retire in August 2019 after being diagnosed with a serious heart condition.

== Statistics ==
Legend
GP	Games played	MPG	Minutes per game	FG%	Field goal percentage
3P%	3-point field goal percentage	FT%	Free throw percentage	RPG	Rebounds per game
APG	Assists per game	SPG	Steals per game	BPG	Blocks per game
PPG	Points per game	**Bold**	Career high		Led the league

=== Domestic leagues ===
==== Regular season ====
Year	Team	League	GP	MPG	FG%	3P%	FT%	RPG	APG	SPG	BPG	PPG	
2013–14	Liège Basket	BLB	33	0	30.1	.513	.395	.847	5.0	1.5	1.3	0.3	16.1
