= 1991 Southern Conference men's basketball tournament =

- Classification: Division I
- Season: 1990–91
- Teams: 7
- Site: Asheville Civic Center; Asheville, NC
- Champions: East Tennessee State (3rd title)
- Winning coach: Alan LeForce (1st title)

1990–91 Southern Conference men's basketball standings
	Conf.				Overall
Team	W		L	PCT	W		L	PCT
Furman	11	–	3	.786	20	–	9	.690
No. 17 East Tennessee State†	11	–	3	.786	28	–	5	.848
Chattanooga	11	–	3	.786	19	–	10	.655
Appalachian State	7	–	7	.500	16	–	14	.533
Marshall	7	–	7	.500	14	–	14	.500
VMI	5	–	9	.357	10	–	18	.357
Western Carolina	3	–	11	.214	11	–	17	.393
The Citadel	1	–	13	.071	6	–	22	.214
† 1991 SoCon Tournament winner As of April 30, 1991; Rankings from AP poll

The 1991 Southern Conference men's basketball tournament took place from March 1–3, 1991 at the Asheville Civic Center in Asheville, North Carolina. The East Tennessee State Buccaneers, led by head coach Alan LeForce, won their third Southern Conference title and received the automatic berth to the 1991 NCAA tournament.

== Format ==
Seven of the conference's eight members participated in the tournament (Marshall was ineligible). Teams were seeded based on conference winning percentage. The tournament used a preset bracket consisting of three rounds.

== Bracket ==
Quarterfinals; March 1
4	Appalachian State	100
5	VMI	72
2	#19 East Tennessee St.	99
7	The Citadel	70
3	Chattanooga	84
6	Western Carolina	83

Semifinals; March 2
1	Furman	82
4	Appalachian State	100
2	#19 East Tennessee St.	101
3	Chattanooga	74

Finals; March 3
2	#19 East Tennessee St.	101
4	Appalachian State	82

* Overtime game

== See also ==
- List of Southern Conference men's basketball champions
