= Toby McKenzie =

American businessman, entrepreneur, and philanthropist

- Born: Steve Allen McKenzie; June 11, 1953; Cleveland, Tennessee, United States
- Died: May 2, 2013 (aged 59); Cleveland, Tennessee
- Occupation: Businessman
- Known for: Rent to own, National Cash Advance, real estate developments.

Steve Allen "Toby" McKenzie (June 11, 1953 – May 2, 2013) was an American businessman, entrepreneur, and philanthropist from Cleveland, Tennessee. He began his career by founding two rent-to-own businesses and later made his fortune after founding National Cash Advance, a payday lending company. He later began investing in businesses and real estate speculations, and lost all of his assets as a result of the Great Recession.

== Early life and education ==
McKenzie was born to Bob and Gail Bettis McKenzie in 1953 in Bradley County, Tennessee. He had one brother, Mark Patrick McKenzie. He attended Bradley Central High School, where he played football and baseball. He graduated in 1971. After high school, he took a job as a paperboy for the Chattanooga Times Free Press and the Cleveland Daily Banner.

== Business career ==
In the 1980s, McKenzie founded two rent-to-own businesses in Cleveland. In 1994 he founded the National Cash Advance, a payday loan company. He sold the company in 1999. At the time of its selling, the National Cash Advance included 550 stores nationwide.

In the early 2000s McKenzie began investing in real estate developments that he believed would increase in value by borrowing money from multiple banks. These included hundreds of acres of land in East Tennessee and over 100 businesses including a golf course in Ooltewah, a bowling alley, a hotel in Sweetwater, a used car dealership and a shopping center on Paul Huff Parkway in Cleveland that was never built. These reckless investments would eventually lead to his bankruptcy.

In 2004 he founded McKenzie Trucking & Leasing, a trucking company.

== Bankruptcy ==
In December 2008, during the 2008 financial crisis and the beginning of the Great Recession, McKenzie filed for Chapter 11 Bankruptcy in the United States District Court in Chattanooga, Tennessee disclosing $151 million in debts and assets of over $100 million. He was then ordered to make $11.5 million in lease payments on defaulted properties. The following year he lost millions of his assets including an unfinished home.

== Philanthropy ==
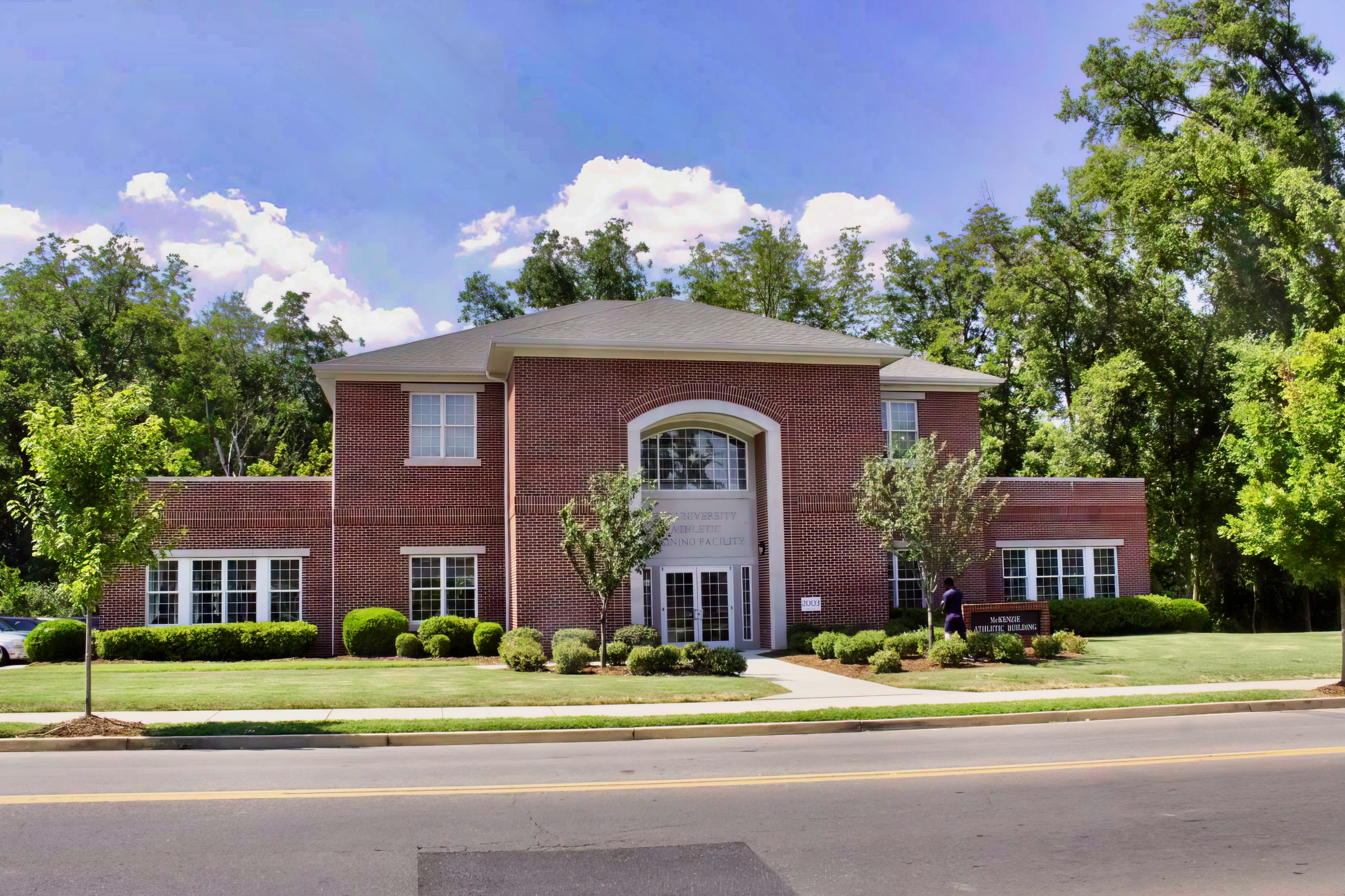
Lee University's McKenzie Athletic Building opened in 2002.

McKenzie made numerous donations to local schools and causes, including the United Way, Lee University, and Habitat for Humanity. In the late 1990s, McKenzie and his wife gave a donation of $2 million to the University of Tennessee at Chattanooga to help pay off the debt on the school's basketball arena, The Roundhouse. In 2000, the arena was renamed the McKenzie Arena. In 2000 McKenzie and his wife pledged $4 million to an athletic center that adjoins the Neyland-Thompson Sports Complex at The University of Tennessee in Knoxville. As a result of his bankruptcy McKenzie was unable to complete his pledge, and in 2009, his name was removed from the building.

== Personal life ==
McKenzie was of the Pentecostal faith and was a member of Mount Olive Church of God.

In 1979 McKenzie married businesswoman Brenda Lawson. They had two children, Ashley and Steve Jr. They divorced in 2000. In 2006 he married Rebecca Harris.

McKenzie died on May 2, 2013, from heart failure.
