= Chad Copeland =

American basketball player (born 1971)

Personal information
- Born: February 23, 1971 (age 55) Cookeville, Tennessee, U.S.
- Listed height: 5 ft 11 in (1.80 m)
- Listed weight: 170 lb (77 kg)

Career information
- High school: Bradley Central (Cleveland, Tennessee)
- College: Florida State (1989–1991); Chattanooga (1992–1994)
- NBA draft: 1994: undrafted
- Position: Point guard

Career highlights
- SoCon co-Player of the Year (1994); SoCon tournament MVP (1994)

Chad Copeland (born February 23, 1971) is an American former basketball player known for his collegiate career at the University of Tennessee at Chattanooga (Chattanooga) between 1992 and 1994. He was named the Southern Conference co-Player of the Year as a senior after leading the Mocs to back-to-back SoCon regular season and conference tournament championships as well as back-to-back NCAA Tournaments.

== College career ==
A 5'11" point guard, Copeland grew up in Tennessee and attended Bradley Central High School. In his senior season he averaged 26 points and 10 assists per game in leading the team to a 29–3 record. Copeland pursued basketball in college when he went to Florida State to play for the Seminoles. His time there was not remarkable, and after his sophomore season in 1990–91 he asked to be released from the program, which he was granted. Copeland had only played in 13 games that year, starting one, and averaged fewer than three points per contest. Junior college phenom Sam Cassell had committed to play for Florida State the following season and Copeland's role at point guard looked even more diminished by Cassell's signing.

Copeland had to sit out one season per NCAA by-laws, but after waiting he was able to suit up for the Chattanooga Mocs. In his final two years of college eligibility, Copeland guided Chattanooga to an overall record of 49–14 (30–6 in conference play), two regular season Southern Conference championships, two conference tournament championships, and two NCAA Tournament berths. In 1993–94 he averaged 20.1 points per game, earned First Team All-Conference honors, and was named the co-SoCon Player of the Year as well as the SoCon Tournament MVP. His 206 made free throws that season are a school record.

In 1999, the University of Tennessee at Chattanooga inducted him into their athletics hall of fame.
