= Greg Dennis =

Australian rugby league player

Personal information
- Full name: Gregory Dennis
- Born: July 1926; Bulli, New South Wales
- Died: 29 Jun 2017 (aged 90–91); Wollongong, New South Wales

Playing information
- Position: Wing
Club
Years	Team	Pld	T	G	FG	P
1947	St. George	8	3	0	0	9
- Source: Whiticker/Hudson

Gregory Dennis (1926-2017) was an Australian rugby league footballer from the 1940s.

Greg Dennis played his junior league at Thirroul, New South Wales and was selected to represent Southern Districts against the touring British Lions team in 1946 aged only 19. He joined St. George Dragons in 1947 for one season, but struggled to retain a first grade spot during the season. He retired from Sydney football at the conclusion of 1947 and returned to Thirroul.
