= Tommy Woods (basketball) =

American basketball player

Personal information
- Born: June 10, 1943 (age 83) Blount County, Tennessee, U.S.
- Listed height: 6 ft 7 in (2.01 m)
- Listed weight: 210 lb (95 kg)

Career information
- High school: Charles M. Hall (Alcoa, Tennessee)
- College: East Tennessee State (1964–1967)
- NBA draft: 1967: undrafted
- Position: Power forward
- Number: 54

Career history
- 1967–1968: Kentucky Colonels

Career highlights
- 2× All-OVC (1966, 1967); No. 22 honored by East Tennessee State Buccaneers
- Stats at Basketball Reference

James Thomas Woods Jr. (born June 10, 1943) is an American former professional basketball player. He played for the Kentucky Colonels during the 1967–68 ABA season after a collegiate career at East Tennessee State University (ETSU). He also played internationally for a time after his one season in the ABA.

== Career ==
Woods was a racial integration pioneer in college. When he enrolled at ETSU as a freshman in 1963–64 to play basketball, he became the first African-American player in school history. In a segregated southern United States, Woods was harshly booed early in his college career. His final three seasons from 1964 to 1967, in which he was eligible to play for the varsity team, saw Woods have an ETSU Hall of Fame career. He was a two-time All-Ohio Valley Conference Team selection and set still-unbroken school records for rebounds in a game (38), career (1,034) and career per-game average (16.2). By the end of his career, the same fans who had been booing him as a freshman were giving him "loudest and longest" standing ovation on senior night that a local reporter had ever seen.

After college, Woods played in the American Basketball Association for the Kentucky Colonels for one season. After a brief stint playing internationally, he retired due to an injury. Woods then served as a police officer in Louisville, Kentucky for the next 30-plus years. In 1996, ETSU inducted him into their hall of fame. On November 3, 2012, in a ceremony prior to the school's 2012–13 season, the men's basketball locker room was named in his honor.

== Career statistics ==
Legend
GP	Games played	GS	Games started	MPG	Minutes per game
FG%	Field goal percentage	3P%	3-point field goal percentage	FT%	Free throw percentage
RPG	Rebounds per game	APG	Assists per game	SPG	Steals per game
BPG	Blocks per game	PPG	Points per game	**Bold**	Career high

=== ABA ===
==== Regular season ====
Year	Team	GP	MPG	FG%	3P%	FT%	RPG	APG	PPG
1967–68	Kentucky	18	10.2	.326	.000	.875	3.1	.2	2.3

== See also ==
- List of NCAA Division I men's basketball players with 30 or more rebounds in a game
