= Bradley Central High School =

American public high school

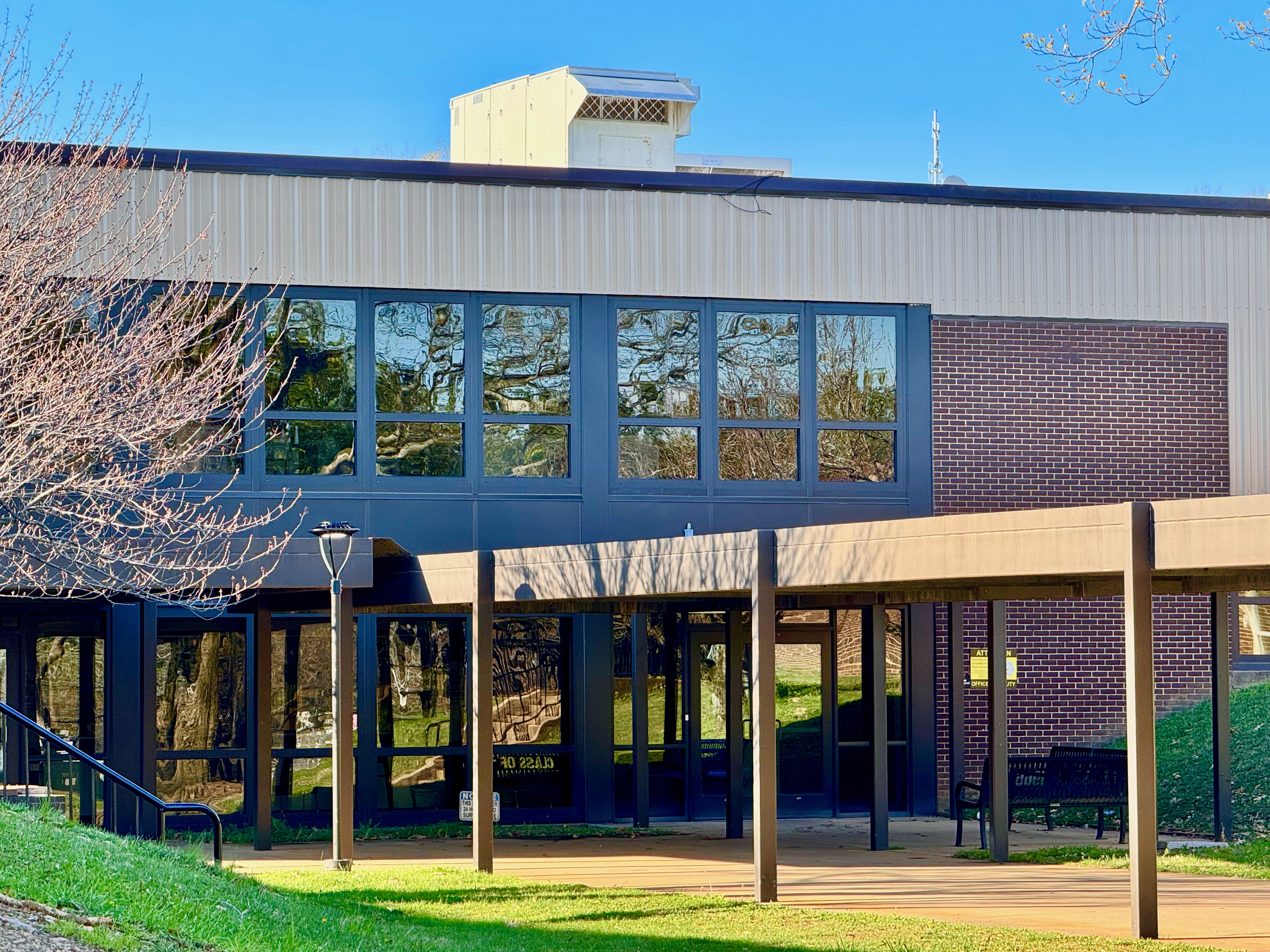

Location
- 1000 South Lee Highway; Cleveland, Tennessee 37310; United States; 35.15814°N 84.89029°W

Information
- Type: Public
- Established: 1916
- School district: Bradley County Schools
- Principal: Patrick Spangler
- Teaching staff: 108.67 (FTE)
- Grades: 9 to 12
- Enrollment: 1,662 (2023-2024)
- Student to teacher ratio: 15.29
- Colors: Black and Vegas gold
- Athletics: 13 Interscholastic Sports Teams
- Athletics conference: TSSAA
- Mascot: Bear
- Nickname: Bears
- Website: bchs.bradleyschools.org

Bradley Central High School is a public high school located in Cleveland, Tennessee that serves approximately 1,700 students from grades 9-12. It was founded in 1916, and is part of the Bradley County Schools system. The school maintains a crosstown rivalry with Cleveland High School, as well as fellow county rival Walker Valley High School.

== History ==
The school opened its doors on September 11, 1916, and was the second public high school in the county, after Charleston High School in Charleston, which opened in 1913. The original campus was located on the present site of Ocoee Middle School, and was called Central High School at first. It was renamed Bradley County High School in 1920 and Bradley Central High School in 1948. The school was moved to its current location on South Lee Highway (U.S. 11/64) in 1972. The Jim Smiddy Arena opened Jan. 6, 1973.

In 2011, the school opened a newly constructed 25,000 square-foot Fine Arts Center. The $3.3 million project was finished within twelve months and includes 600 seats.

== Athletics ==
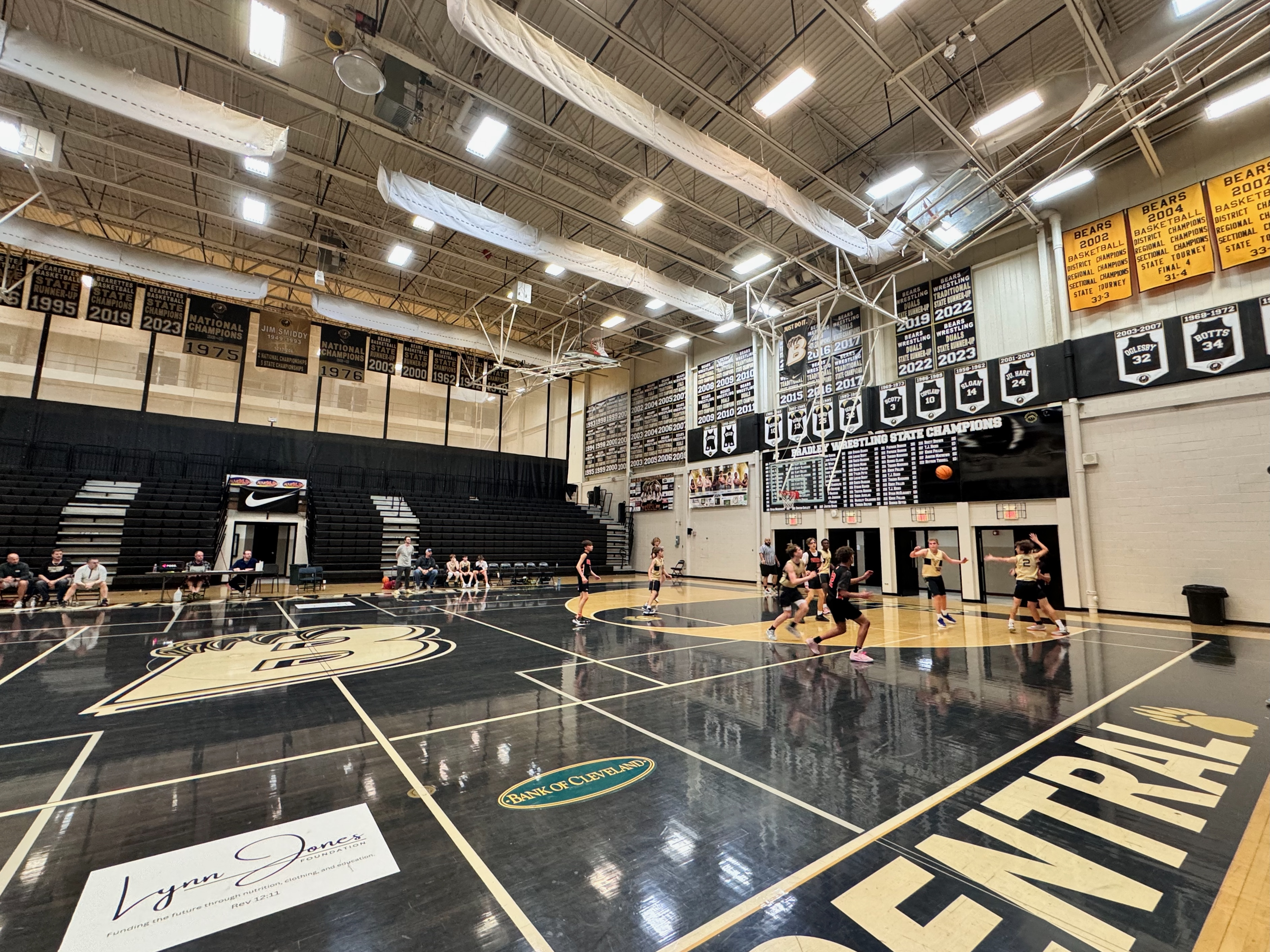
Jim Smiddy Arena

Bradley competes in the Tennessee Secondary School Athletic Association (TSSAA) and its sports are:

- Baseball (state champions 1994)
- Basketball (Boys state champions 1940, 1942, 1962) (Girls' state champions 2024, 2023, 2019, 1976, 1975, 1973, 1970, 1962)
- Bowling
- Cheerleading
- Cross Country
- Football (state champions 1961, 1976)
- Golf
- Softball
- Soccer
- Tennis
- Track and Field
- Volleyball (state championships 1982, 1991, 1993, 1994)
- Wrestling (27 state championships total)

== Demographics ==
96.6 percent of the students are white, while two percent are Hispanic, 1.1 percent are African American, 0.1 percent are Asian, 0.1 percent are Pacific Islander and 0.1 are Native American.

== Notable alumni ==
- Mike Bell, Tennessee state senator
- Anthony Burger, southern gospel singer and musician attended but did not graduate
- Boo Carter, college football defensive back
- Ryan Casteel, former professional baseball player
- Charles Paul Conn, president of Lee University
- Chad Copeland, basketball player
- Rex Dockery, former football college head coach
- Dee Gibson, former professional basketball player
- Rhyne Howard, current women's basketball player
- Brittany Jackson, former professional basketball player
- Dale Jones, former professional football player and football college coach
- Tim Long, former professional football player
- Toby McKenzie, businessman and entrepreneur
- Terrence Oglesby, professional basketball player in the International Basketball Federation
- Jay Person, professional football player
- Christian Pitre, actress
- Alvin Scott, former professional basketball player
- Steve Sloan, former football college head coach
- Ray Stephens, former professional baseball player
