= Tim Smith (basketball) =

American professional basketball player (born 1983)

Personal information
- Born: July 2, 1983 (age 43)
- Listed height: 5 ft 9 in (1.75 m)
- Listed weight: 155 lb (70 kg)

Career information
- High school: Hargrave Military Academy (Chatham, Virginia)
- College: East Tennessee State (2002–2006)
- NBA draft: 2006: undrafted
- Playing career: 2006–2010
- Position: Point guard

Career history
- 2006: ETHA Engomis
- 2006: Al Jeish Army
- 2007–2008: Gothia Basket
- 2008–2010: Ciudad de Vigo Básquet
- 2010: BSC Raiffeisen Panthers Fürstenfeld
- 2010: LSU-Atletas

Career highlights
- LEB Silver All-Defensive Team (2009); NCAA season steals leader (2006); Atlantic Sun Player of the Year (2006); First-team All-Atlantic Sun (2006); 2× First-team All-SoCon (2004, 2005); SoCon Freshman of the Year (2003); No. 5 honored by East Tennessee State Buccaneers

Timothy Smith (born July 2, 1982) is an American former professional basketball player who played the point guard position. Smith played collegiately at East Tennessee State University (ETSU) from 2002–03 to 2005–06 before becoming a professional.

== Basketball career ==
=== College ===
When Tim Smith entered college in 2002, ETSU was still a member of the Southern Conference. As a freshman in 2002–03 he recorded 475 points, 114 assists and 73 steals. He was named the Southern Conference Freshman of the Year while guiding ETSU as runners-up in the conference's North Division. The Buccaneers also won the 2003 Southern Conference Tournament and earned an automatic berth into the NCAA Tournament, but lost to Wake Forest, 76 to 73, in the first round.

As a sophomore in 2003–04, Smith once again led ETSU to a successful season. He reached the career 1,000-point mark after finishing the year with 565 points, and he also recorded 145 assists and 82 steals. ETSU were Southern Conference regular season and tournament champions, but once again lost in the NCAA Tournament's first round by three points. Cincinnati defeated the Buccaneers, 80 to 77. For the second consecutive season, however, Smith was named to the Southern Conference All-Tournament First Team. He also led the team in scoring at 17.7 points per game and was named a First Team All-Conference honoree.

In 2004–05, Smith's junior year, he repeated as a Southern Conference First Team selection after recording 645 points, 123 assists and 62 steals. The Buccaneers struggled despite his 22.2 points per game average and only finished with a 10–19 overall record.

East Tennessee State University moved to the Atlantic Sun Conference between his junior and senior seasons. As a senior in 2005–06, Smith solidified his name in both the ETSU and NCAA record books. In 28 games he recorded 95 steals, good for a 3.39 steals per game average that led NCAA Division I. His 22.0 points per game average led ETSU for a third straight season, and his 615 points scored that season brought his career total to exactly 2,300, the most in school history. Smith's 313 career steals is second in ETSU history to Keith Jennings' 334. Smith was also honored as the Atlantic Sun Conference Player of the Year in 2006.

=== Professional ===
Smith did not get selected in the 2006 NBA draft so he took his game abroad to play professionally. In his first season, he played for ETHA Engomis in Cyprus Basketball Division 1. He started all 10 games that he played in, but was then waived and signed with Al Jeish Army in Syria. However, he never appeared in a game for this club. The following year (2007–08) Smith signed with Gothia Basket in the Swedish Basketball League. In 11 games played, all of which he started, he averaged 17.9 points, 3.3 assists and 1.9 steals per game.

His best season across his professional career, occurred in 2008–09 as a member of Ciudad de Vigo Básquet in Spain's Liga Española de Baloncesto. Smith started all 30 games, averaged 15.5 points, 3.9 assists and 1.7 steals en route to being named to the Eurobasket.com Spanish LEB Silver All-Defensive Team. He helped the team move up to the LEB Gold Division for the 2009–10, of which he played for them again. Smith signed a contract to play for BSC Raiffeisen Panthers Fürstenfeld in Austria for the 2010–11 season.

== See also ==
- List of NCAA Division I men's basketball season steals leaders
