= Les Robinson =

American basketball coach (born 1942)

Biographical details
- Born: September 23, 1942 (age 84); St. Albans, West Virginia, U.S.

Coaching career (HC unless noted)
- 1965–1966: NC State (assistant)
- 1966–1968: Cedar Key School
- 1968–1969: Western Carolina (assistant)
- 1969–1974: The Citadel (assistant)
- 1974–1985: The Citadel
- 1985–1990: East Tennessee State
- 1990–1996: NC State

Administrative career (AD unless noted)
- 1986–1990: East Tennessee State
- 1996–2000: NC State
- 2000–2008: The Citadel

Head coaching record
- Overall: 291–330 (college)
- Tournaments: 1–3 (NCAA Division I)

Accomplishments and honors

Championships
- SoCon regular season (1989); 2 SoCon tournament (1989, 1990)

Awards
- 2× SoCon Coach of the Year (1979, 1990)

Les Robinson (born September 23, 1942) is an American former college basketball coach and athletic director at East Tennessee State University, North Carolina State University, and The Citadel, The Military College of South Carolina. He is a member of the Southern Conference Hall of Fame and the only person to have been both head basketball coach and athletic director at three different Division I colleges.

== Coaching career ==
A native of St. Albans, West Virginia, Robinson graduated in 1965 with a Bachelor of Science degree in parks and recreation and physical education from North Carolina State University where he played basketball then served as a student assistant coach and graduate assistant coach under Head Coaches Everett Case and Press Maravich. From there, he was the head basketball coach and athletic director at Cedar Key School in Cedar Key, Florida, for two years. In 1968 he returned to graduate school, serving as an assistant coach at Western Carolina University where he also received a master's degree in physical education and guidance counseling.

After one year at Western Carolina, Robinson moved to The Citadel as an assistant coach. He served in that role for five years before taking over the program in 1974–75. He coached at The Citadel for 11 seasons. Although he only managed a .500-or-better record five times and finished as high as third in Southern Conference play only twice, his 132 wins were the most in school history before Pat Dennis passed him in 2004 with his 133rd win; his 1978–79 team was the first in school history to win 20 games and he coached the Bulldogs to a record 23 consecutive home wins. He was twice named South Carolina Coach of the Year and was a two-time Southern Conference Coach of the Year; he was inducted into The Citadel Athletic Hall of Fame in 2012.

In 1985 Robinson became East Tennessee State University's men's head basketball coach and athletic director. Under his guidance, ETSU won the 1989 and 1990 Southern Conference championships, playing in NCAA tournament both years. In 1990 Robinson was named Southern Conference Coach of the Year and Tennessee Coach of the Year.

In 1989, Robinson served as an assistant coach for the U.S. World Championship qualifying team in Mexico City, Mexico. He also coached the South team to a Bronze medal in the 1993 Olympic Festival in San Antonio, Texas.

Robinson returned to his alma mater in 1990 after Jim Valvano was forced out in the wake of an NCAA investigation. He was the 1991 District Coach of the Year as selected by the National Association of Basketball Coaches (NABC) after leading NC State to a 20–11 record in the first season. Robinson is, as of 2026, one of only five first-year coaches in the Atlantic Coast Conference history to win 20 games, post a winning regular-season conference record, and win games in both the ACC and NCAA tournaments.

However, a year earlier, NC State self-imposed a limit of only 12 total scholarships for 1990–91 and 1991–92 as part of an investigation into misconduct under Valvano. The scholarship reductions took their full effect in Robinson's second season, and the team plummeted into the ACC's second division for the next five years. The low point of Robinson's tenure in Raleigh came during the 1992–93 season. Due to injuries and academic-related suspensions, Robinson was only able to dress seven players for most of conference play. They ultimately finished 8–19, the worst record in modern Wolfpack history.

In 1992, the ACC tournament was expanded because of the addition of Florida State. A play-in game between the eighth and ninth place teams was created, and during his five years as the NC State coach after its addition, Robinson's Wolfpack played in the play-in game four out of five times (finishing seventh in 1992 and avoiding the game). Because of his team's traditional appearance in the Thursday night game, the game was referred to as the "Les Robinson Invitational" by ACC fans. The play-in game was discontinued when the ACC expanded to include Miami and Virginia Tech, and required three Thursday games.

Robinson would stay on as head coach through the 1995–96 season. Although he never won nearly as many games as his predecessors, his stint went a long way towards cleansing the image of the program to both insiders and outsiders. Robinson was appointed NC State's athletic director in 1996 and stepped down as head coach. He left to become The Citadel's athletic director in 2000. On January 25, 2008, he announced he would retire at the end of the school year, effective June 30.

In 2016 Robinson briefly served as interim athletic director at Lander University in Greenwood, South Carolina; he currently works for the Grinalds Group which provides guidance and advice to college administrators. He is an honorary member of the Alumni Associations of The Citadel and East Tennessee State and was inducted into the South Carolina Athletic Hall of Fame in 2011.

== Head coaching record ==
=== College ===
Record table
| Season | Team | Overall | Conference | Standing | Postseason |
|---|---|---|---|---|---|
The Citadel Bulldogs (Southern Conference) (1974–1985)
| 1974–75 | The Citadel | 5–15 | 2–11 | 7th | |
| 1975–76 | The Citadel | 10–17 | 6–7 | 6th | |
| 1976–77 | The Citadel | 8–19 | 2–9 | 7th | |
| 1977–78 | The Citadel | 8–19 | 2–11 | 8th | |
| 1978–79 | The Citadel | 20–7 | 10–4 | 3rd | |
| 1979–80 | The Citadel | 14–13 | 6–10 | T–6th | |
| 1980–81 | The Citadel | 9–17 | 2–14 | 9th | |
| 1981–82 | The Citadel | 14–14 | 7–9 | T–6th | |
| 1982–83 | The Citadel | 12–16 | 7–9 | 6th | |
| 1983–84 | The Citadel | 14–14 | 8–8 | T–4th | |
| 1984–85 | The Citadel | 18–11 | 11–5 | 3rd | |
| The Citadel: | | 132–162 | 63–97 | | |
East Tennessee State Buccaneers (Southern Conference) (1985–1990)
| 1985–86 | East Tennessee State | 13–16 | 8–8 | T–5th | |
| 1986–87 | East Tennessee State | 7–21 | 3–13 | T–8th | |
| 1987–88 | East Tennessee State | 14–15 | 9–7 | T–3rd | |
| 1988–89 | East Tennessee State | 20–11 | 7–7 | T–4th | NCAA Division I First Round |
| 1989–90 | East Tennessee State | 27–7 | 12–2 | 1st | NCAA Division I First Round |
| East Tennessee State: | | 81–70 | 39–37 | | |
NC State Wolfpack (Atlantic Coast Conference) (1990–1996)
| 1990–91 | NC State | 20–11 | 8–6 | 4th | NCAA Division I Second Round |
| 1991–92 | NC State | 12–18 | 6–10 | 7th | |
| 1992–93 | NC State | 8–19 | 2–14 | T–8th | |
| 1993–94 | NC State | 11–19 | 5–11 | 9th | |
| 1994–95 | NC State | 12–15 | 4–12 | 8th | |
| 1995–96 | NC State | 15–16 | 3–13 | 9th | |
| NC State: | | 78–98 | 28–66 | | |
| Total: | | 291–330 | | | |
National champion Postseason invitational champion Conference regular season champion Conference regular season and conference tournament champion Division regular season champion Division regular season and conference tournament champion Conference tournament champion
