= McKenzie Arena =

Arena in Tennessee, United States

- "The Roundhouse"
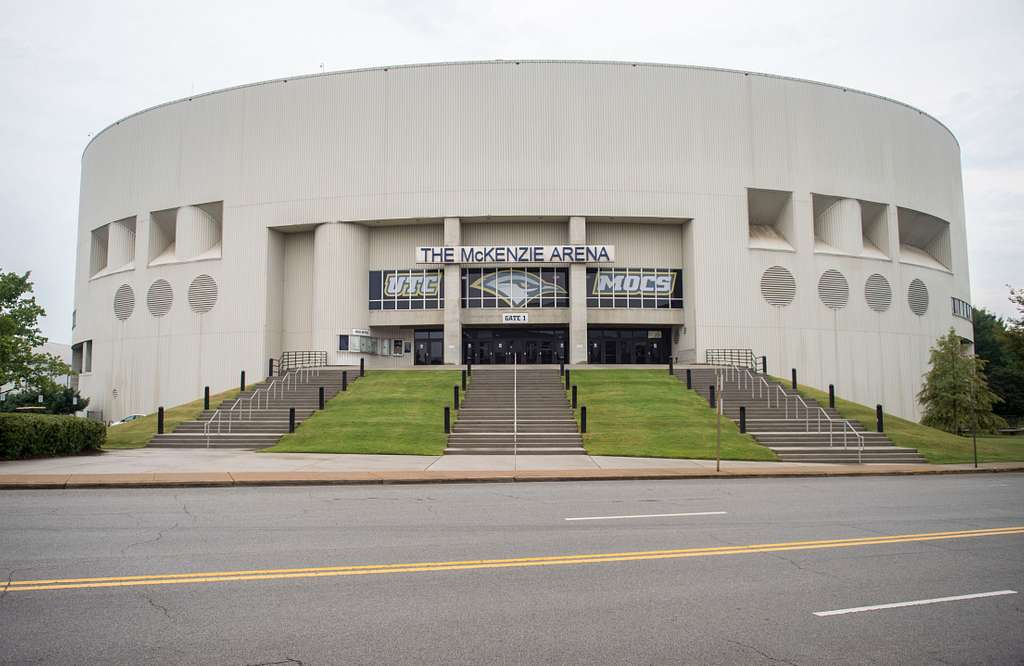
- Interactive map of McKenzie Arena
- Former names: UTC Arena (1982–2000)
- Location: 720 East 4th Street; Chattanooga, TN 37403 USA
- Coordinates: 35.050382°N 85.30091°W
- Owner: University of Tennessee at Chattanooga
- Operator: University of Tennessee at Chattanooga
- Capacity: 10,995 (basketball)
- Surface: Multi-surface
- Record attendance: 11,221 (December 4, 2007 vs Tennessee)

Construction
- Groundbreaking: 1980
- Opened: October 8, 1982
- Cost: $15.5 million ($51.7 million in 2025 dollars)
- Architects: Franklin Group Architects (Architecture) Campbell and Associates Inc.(Mechanical and Civil Engineering)

Tenants
- Chattanooga Mocs men's & women's basketball

McKenzie Arena (also called "The Roundhouse") is the primary basketball arena for the University of Tennessee at Chattanooga (UTC) in Chattanooga, Tennessee. It replaced Maclellan Gymnasium, a 4,177-seat gymnasium now used for women's volleyball and wrestling. Originally called UTC Arena, it was renamed McKenzie Arena on February 21, 2000, in honor of athletic supporters Toby and Brenda McKenzie of Cleveland, Tennessee. The arena opened on October 8, 1982. It was designed by Campbell & Associates Architects with David J. Moore as the on-site architect/construction administrator.

The first season included a visit by then defending NCAA national champion North Carolina Tar Heels, a team which included Michael Jordan, Brad Daugherty and Sam Perkins. The arena hosted the 2005, 2009 and 2011 men's Southern Conference basketball tournament and the 2005, 2009 and 2011 women's tournament championship game. In addition to basketball, the arena has hosted many concerts, ice shows, rodeos, circuses, truck rallies and wrestling events. The arena is also home to UTC's department of intercollegiate athletics. The arena also hosted the 2006 TSSAA State Wrestling tournament.

The arena can also accommodate concerts, with a 64-by-48-foot (20 by 15 m) stage and capacities of 7,463 for side-stage shows, 9,107 end-stage and 11,557 center-stage shows; ice shows, circuses and even monster truck rallies (arena floor dimensions are 151'6" by 181'9").

The arena hosted WCW Halloween Havoc in 1991 and the thirteenth WWF In Your House pay-per-view In Your House 13: Final Four in 1997. It also hosted Clash of the Champions IV, the first Clash of Champions event produced by WCW. World Wrestling Entertainment continues to hold matches at the arena.

In 2011, Winter Guard International made its first trip to McKenzie for the first annual WGI MidSouth Percussion Championship.

Terrell Owens also hosted his own induction ceremony into the Pro Football Hall of Fame at the arena on August 4, 2018.

== See also ==
- Finley Stadium
- List of NCAA Division I basketball arenas
