= Keith Jennings (basketball) =

American basketball coach (born 1968)

Personal information
- Born: November 2, 1968 (age 58) Culpeper, Virginia, U.S.
- Listed height: 5 ft 7 in (1.70 m)
- Listed weight: 160 lb (73 kg)

Career information
- High school: Culpeper County (Culpeper County, Virginia)
- College: East Tennessee State (1987–1991)
- NBA draft: 1991: undrafted
- Playing career: 1991–2004
- Position: Point guard
- Number: 2
- Coaching career: 2004–present

Career history

Playing
- 1991: Jacksonville Hooters
- 1991–1992: Brandt Hagen
- 1992–1995: Golden State Warriors
- 1995–1996: Estudiantes
- 1997–1999: Le Mans
- 1999: Real Madrid
- 1999–2000: Fenerbahçe
- 2000: Saint Petersburg Lions
- 2000–2002: Strasbourg
- 2002–2003: SLUC Nancy
- 2003–2004: Strasbourg

Coaching
- 2004–2007: Highland School
- 2007–2008: East Tennessee State (GA)
- 2008–2009: Science Hill HS (assistant)
- 2009–2014: Bluefield (assistant)
- 2014–2017: Lees–McRae (assistant)
- 2017–present: Lees–McRae (women's)

Career highlights
- French League Foreign MVP (1999); French League Best Scorer (1999); Consensus second-team All-American (1991); Frances Pomeroy Naismith Award (1991); 2× SoCon Player of the Year (1990, 1991); No. 22 honored by East Tennessee State Buccaneers
- Stats at NBA.com
- Stats at Basketball Reference

Keith Russell "Mister" Jennings (born November 2, 1968) is an American basketball coach, who formerly played professional in the National Basketball Association (NBA) and overseas in European leagues.

== College career ==
Jennings, a 5-foot-7-inch (1.70 m) tall point guard, attended East Tennessee State University, for four academic years (1987–91). Jennings won the 1991 Frances Pomeroy Naismith Award, given to the outstanding collegiate senior six feet tall and under, and was a second-team consensus All-American. He also led the NCAA Division I that year in three-point field goals, shooting 59 percent.

It was in college that Jennings was primarily called by the nickname "Mister", which was originally given to him by his father during his childhood.

== Professional playing career ==
Jennings was not selected in the 1991 NBA draft, and started his NBA career as a free agent. He spent three seasons in the NBA, with the Golden State Warriors (1992–95), playing in 164 games, and averaging 6.6 points and 3.7 assists in 18.0 minutes per game. Jennings's personal best in the NBA was a 23-point performance, in his next-to-last regular season game with the Warriors, on April 22, 1995. In that game, Jennings made 8 of 10 field goals, including 3 of 4 three-pointers, and was perfect in 4 free-throw attempts in 41 minutes. He dished off 10 assists that game to cap off his best performance in the NBA. He was selected by the Toronto Raptors in the 1995 expansion draft, but did not play for them. He also played professionally in Europe. In 2003–04 he parlayed his experience on the court to help the basketball club in Strasbourg, France.

== Coaching career ==
From 2004 to 2007, Jennings was the head coach of the boys' varsity basketball team at the private Highland School in Warrenton, Virginia. Jennings joined the staff at his alma mater, East Tennessee State, as a graduate assistant coach for the 2007–08 season while he completed his degree. After a year as an assistant coach at Science Hill High School in Johnson City, Tennessee, Jennings was assistant coach at Bluefield College in Bluefield, Virginia from 2009 to 2014. In 2014, he became assistant coach at Lees–McRae College in Banner Elk, North Carolina.

On July 7, 2017, Jennings was named head women's coach at Lees–McRae.

On July 27, 2023, Jennings was named head coach at Culpeper County High School, his alma mater.

== See also ==
- List of shortest players in National Basketball Association history
- List of NCAA Division I men's basketball career assists leaders
- List of NCAA Division I men's basketball career steals leaders
