= East Tennessee State Buccaneers men's basketball =

Men's college basketball team

2025–26 East Tennessee State Buccaneers men's basketball team
- University: East Tennessee State University
- First season: 1918; 108 years ago
- Head coach: Brooks Savage (3rd season)
- Location: Johnson City, Tennessee
- Arena: Freedom Hall Civic Center (capacity: 6,149)
- Conference: SoCon
- Nickname: Buccaneers
- Colors: Navy blue and gold
- All-time record: 1,381–1,096 (.558)

NCAA Division I tournament Sweet Sixteen
- 1957*, 1968

NCAA Division I tournament appearances
- 1957*, 1968, 1989, 1990, 1991, 1992, 2003, 2004, 2009, 2010, 2017

Conference tournament champions
- 1968, 1989, 1990, 1991, 1992, 2003, 2004, 2009, 2010, 2017, 2020

Conference regular-season champions
- 1968, 1990, 1991, 1992, 2001, 2002, 2004, 2007, 2017, 2020, 2026

Conference division champions
- 2003

Uniforms
Home	Away	Alternate
- * at Division II level

The East Tennessee State Buccaneers men's basketball team represents East Tennessee State University (ETSU), located in Johnson City, Tennessee, in men's college basketball. East Tennessee State is coached by Brooks Savage and currently competes in the Southern Conference. The Buccaneers have appeared ten times in the NCAA Division I men's basketball tournament, most recently in 2017.

== History ==
=== Conference affiliations ===
- Pre-1958 – Volunteer State Athletic Conference
- 1958–59 to 1977–78 – Ohio Valley Conference (Note: East Tennessee State joined the OVC for all sports except basketball in the 1957–58 school year.)
- 1979–80 to 2004–05 – Southern Conference (Note: East Tennessee State joined the SoCon for all sports except basketball in the 1978–79 school year.)
- 2005–06 to 2013–14 – Atlantic Sun Conference
- 2014–15 to present – Southern Conference

=== Coaching History ===
No.	Tenure	Coach	Years	Record	Pct.
1	1957–1973	Madison Brooks	16	186–202	.479
2	1973–1976	Leroy Fisher	3	23–52	.307
3	1976–1978	Sonny Smith	3	30–23	.566
4	1978–1982	Jim Hallahan	4	57–53	.518
5	1982–1985	Barry Dowd	3	40–46	.465
6	1985–1990	Les Robinson	5	81–70	.536
7	1990–1996	Alan LeForce	6	108–70	.607
8	1996–2003	Ed DeChellis	7	105–93	.530
9	2003–2015	Murry Bartow	12	224–165	.576
10	2015–2020	Steve Forbes	5	130–43	.751
11	2020–2021	Jason Shay	1	13–12	.520
12	2021–2023	Desmond Oliver	2	27–37	.422
13	2023–present	Brooks Savage	2	61–40	.604
Totals		13 coaches	69 seasons	1,085–906	.545
Records updated through end of 2025–26 season Source; *Alum^Promoted from assistant to head coach

=== Season-by-season results ===
Statistics overview
Season	Coach	Overall	Conference	Standing	Postseason
Madison Brooks (1948–1973)
1957–1958	Madison Brooks	7–18			
1958–1959	Madison Brooks	13–10	5–7	4th	
1959–1960	Madison Brooks	9–14	2–10	7th	
1960–1961	Madison Brooks	9–15	1–11	7th	
1961–1962	Madison Brooks	11–14	3–9	6th	
1962–1963	Madison Brooks	14–8	7–5	3rd	
1963–1964	Madison Brooks	12–10	8–6	6th	
1964–1965	Madison Brooks	6–17	4–10	7th	
1965–1966	Madison Brooks	7–14	3–11	7th	
1966–1967	Madison Brooks	17–9	8–6	3rd	
1967–1968	Madison Brooks	19–8	10–4	1st	NCAA Sweet 16
1968–1969	Madison Brooks	15–11	6–8	5th	
1969–1970	Madison Brooks	15–11	8–6	3rd	
1970–1971	Madison Brooks	12–12	8–6	4th	
1971–1972	Madison Brooks	11–14	6–8	6th	
1972–1973	Madison Brooks	9–17	2–12	8th	
Madison Brooks:		377–281			
Leroy Fisher (1973–1976)
1973–1974	Leroy Fisher	8–18	3–11	8th	
1974–1975	Leroy Fisher	9–14	5–9	5th	
1975–1976	Leroy Fisher	6–20	4–10	8th	
Leroy Fisher:		23–53	12–30		
Sonny Smith (1976–1978)
1976–1977	Sonny Smith	12–14	6–8	5th	
1977–1978	Sonny Smith	18–9	10–4	2nd	
Sonny Smith:		30–23	16–13		
Jim Halihan (1978–1982)
1978–1979	Jim Halihan	16–11	1-5^{?}	9th^{?}	
1979–1980	Jim Halihan	15–13	8–7	4th	
1980–1981	Jim Halihan	13–14	9–7	4th	
1981–1982	Jim Halihan	13–15	8–8	4th	
Jim Halihan:		57–53	26–27		
Barry Dowd (1982–1985)
1982–1983	Barry Dowd	22–9	12–4	3rd	NIT 1st Round
1983–1984	Barry Dowd	9–19	6–10	7th	
1984–1985	Barry Dowd	9–18	3–13	9th	
Barry Dowd:		40–46	21–27		
Les Robinson (1985–1990)
1985–1986	Les Robinson	13–16	8–8	4th	
1986–1987	Les Robinson	7–21	3–13	8th	
1987–1988	Les Robinson	14–15	9–7	4th	
1988–1989	Les Robinson	20–11	7–7	4th	NCAA 1st Round
1989–1990	Les Robinson	27–7	12–2	1st	NCAA 1st Round
Les Robinson:		81–70	39–37		
Alan LeForce (1990–1996)
1990–1991	Alan LeForce	28–5	11–3	1st	NCAA 1st Round
1991–1992	Alan LeForce	24–7	12–2	1st	NCAA 2nd Round
1992–1993	Alan LeForce	19–10	12–6	2nd	
1993–1994	Alan LeForce	16–14	13–5	2nd	
1994–1995	Alan LeForce	14–14	9–5	2nd (North)	
1995–1996	Alan LeForce	7–20	3–11	T-5th (North)	
Alan LeForce:		108–70	60–32		
Ed DeChellis (1996–2003)
1996–1997	Ed DeChellis	7–20	2–11	5th (North)	–
1997–1998	Ed DeChellis	11–16	6–9	T–5th	–
1998–1999	Ed DeChellis	17–11	9–7	3rd (North)	–
1999–2000	Ed DeChellis	14–15	8–8	4th (North)	–
2000–2001	Ed DeChellis	18–10	13–3	1st (North)	–
2001–2002	Ed DeChellis	18–10	11–5	T–1st (North)	–
2002–2003	Ed DeChellis	20–11	11–5	T–1st (North)	NCAA 1st Round
Ed DeChellis:		105–93	60–49		
Murry Bartow (2003–2015)
2003–2004	Murry Bartow	27–6	15–1	1st (North)	NCAA 1st Round
2004–2005	Murry Bartow	10–19	4–12	5th (North)	
2005–2006	Murry Bartow	15–13	12–8	5th	
2006–2007	Murry Bartow	24–10	16–2	1st	NIT 1st Round
2007–2008	Murry Bartow	19–13	11–5	T–3rd	
2008–2009	Murry Bartow	23–10	14–6	T–2nd	NCAA 1st Round
2009–2010	Murry Bartow	20–15	13–7	T–2nd	NCAA 1st Round
2010–2011	Murry Bartow	24–12	16–4	2nd	CIT Semifinals
2011–2012	Murry Bartow	17–13	10–8	T-4th	
2012–2013	Murry Bartow	10–22	8–10	T–7th	
2013–2014	Murry Bartow	19–16	10–8	4th	CIT 2nd Round
2014–2015	Murry Bartow	16–14	8–10	5th	
Murry Bartow:		224–169	127–81		
Steve Forbes (2015–2020)
2015–2016	Steve Forbes	24–12	14–4	2nd	Vegas 16 Semifinals
2016–2017	Steve Forbes	27–8	14–4	T–1st	NCAA 1st Round
2017–2018	Steve Forbes	25–9	14–4	2nd	
2018–2019	Steve Forbes	24–10	13–5	T–3rd	CIT 1st Round
2019–2020	Steve Forbes	30–4	16–2	1st	NCAA Tournament canceled due to COVID-19
Steve Forbes:		130–43	71–19		
Jason Shay (2020–2021)
2020–2021	Jason Shay	13–12	8–7	5th	
Jason Shay:		13–12	8–7		
Desmond Oliver (2021–2023)
2021–2022	Desmond Oliver	15-17	7-11	8th	
2022–2023	Desmond Oliver	12-20	8-10	T–5th	
Desmond Oliver:		27-37	15-21		
Brooks Savage (2023–present)
2024-2025	Brooks Savage	19-16	8-10	7th	
2023-2024	Brooks Savage	19-13	12-6	T–3rd	
Brooks Savage:		38-29	20-16		
Total:		1,381–1,096			
National champion Postseason invitational champion Conference regular season champion Conference regular season and conference tournament champion Division regular season champion Division regular season and conference tournament champion Conference tournament champion

=== The Les Robinson / Alan LeForce era ===
Commonly referred to as "The Glory Days" of ETSU basketball, between 1989 and 1992, ETSU won 4 straight Southern Conference titles while compiling 99 wins. During this 4-year period ETSU had wins over prestigious programs such as Arizona, NC State (3 times), Wake Forest, Cincinnati, BYU, Xavier, Mississippi State, Southern Miss, Tennessee (twice) and Memphis. ETSU also suffered their most famous loss when they lost by 1 point to top ranked Oklahoma as a 16th seed in the 1989 NCAA tournament.

When Les Robinson left for NC State after the 1990 season, longtime assistant Alan LeForce took over a veteran team led by Senior Keith "Mister" Jennings. The team was ranked as high as 10th in the nation during the 1991 season and finished the year 17th in the AP poll and 15th in the Coaches poll. In the 1992 NCAA tournament ETSU upset the Arizona Wildcats in the opening round, but eventually fell in the second round to the Michigan Wolverines and the Fab Five.

The Buccaneers went into steep decline after that, bottoming out with a 7–20 record in 1995-96. LeForce resigned after the season.

=== The Ed Dechellis era ===
In 1996 Ed Dechellis replaced Alan Leforce who resigned after the 1995–1996 season. In 2001 Dechellis led ETSU to their first regular season conference title since the 91–92 season. In 2003 Dechellis helped ETSU win their first Southern Conference Tournament title and first NCAA berth since 1992. ETSU faced Wake Forest University in the first round where they lost in the final seconds 73–76 after having a chance to win the game with the last shot. After the 2003 season Dechellis left for Penn State.

Dechellis complied 105–93 record at ETSU but is mostly remembered for bringing prominence back to the ETSU basketball program that had struggled after the 1993 season.

=== The Murry Bartow era ===
In 2003 ETSU hired Murry Bartow after Ed Dechellis took the head coaching position at Penn State. Bartow took over a senior led team that won 27 games and nearly went undefeated in conference play in his first season; additionally, ETSU won their second straight Southern Conference Tournament and headed back to the NCAA tournament for the second straight year. ETSU had another close call in the 2004 NCAA tournament when they lost to Cincinnati 77–80 in the closing seconds, much like the Wake Forest game the previous year.

In the 2005–2006 season ETSU left the Southern Conference to join the Atlantic Sun Conference after the school dropped football. During his time in the Atlantic Sun ETSU has received 4 postseason bids. Back to Back NCAA tournaments in 2009 and 2010, the NIT in 2007 and the CIT in 2011. The Buccaneers rejoined the Southern Conference as part of reinstating football in 2016. After 12 years, an overall record of 224–169 (with a record of 16–14, 8–10 in SoCon play in the 2014–15 season), and three NCAA appearances at East Tennessee State, Bartow was fired due a five-season tournament drought with declining team performance.

=== The Steve Forbes era ===
After Murry Bartow was fired, Steve Forbes became the 16th head coach in ETSU's 95-year history on March 30, 2015. He served two seasons as an assistant coach at Wichita State Shockers men's basketball where he helped take the Shockers to the Sweet 16 the past season before taking the ETSU job. Forbes' recruiting ties and his extensive background as an assistant coach at the NCAA Division I level – which included a five-year stop at the University of Tennessee – made him a perfect fit for ETSU, according to ETSU Director of Intercollegiate Athletics Dr. Richard Sander. In five seasons at ETSU, Forbes tallied at least 24 wins each year. The 2017 team shared the Southern Conference regular season title and won the Southern Conference Tournament in Asheville to represent the league in the NCAA tournament. Forbes led the team to another conference regular season championship in 2019-20 and a school record 30 wins. On April 30, 2020, Forbes left ETSU to accept the head coaching job at Wake Forest.

=== Jason Shay ===
On May 7, 2020, a week after Forbes departed for Wake Forest, ETSU assistant coach Jason Shay was named the 17th head coach of the program. In the 2020–21 season, Shay led the Buccaneers to a 13–12 overall record and an appearance in the semifinals of the 2021 Southern Conference Tournament. On March 30, 2021, Shay decided to resign after one season as head coach.

=== The Desmond Oliver era ===
Six days after Jason Shay resigned, University of Tennessee assistant coach Desmond Oliver was named the 18th head coach of the program on April 5, 2021.

Desmond Oliver was let go on March 10, 2023. Dr. Richard Sander, ETSU's Athletic Director, stated “I met with Coach Oliver today, and we discussed the program is not meeting the expectations of the Athletics Department. We feel that parting ways is the best thing for our men's basketball program and our student-athletes. We wish Coach Oliver the best in his future endeavors.”

Oliver had finished the second year of a five-year contract, the first 20-loss season for ETSU in a decade.

=== The Brooks Savage era ===
Brooks Savage was named the 19th head coach of ETSU men's basketball on March 20, 2023.

== Postseason ==
=== NCAA Division I tournament results ===
The Buccaneers have appeared in the NCAA Division I Tournament ten times. Their combined record is 2–11. They also qualified for the 2020 NCAA tournament, which was canceled due to the COVID-19 pandemic.

Year	Seed	Round	Opponent	Result
1968		First round Sweet Sixteen; Regional 3rd-place game	Florida State; Ohio State; Marquette	W 79–69; L 72–79; L 57–69
1989	#16	First round	#1 Oklahoma	L 71–72
1990	#13	First round	#4 Georgia Tech	L 83–99
1991	#10	First round	#7 Iowa	L 73–76
1992	#14	First round Second Round	#3 Arizona #6 Michigan	W 87–80; L 90–102
2003	#15	First round	#2 Wake Forest	L 73–76
2004	#13	First round	#4 Cincinnati	L 77–80
2009	#16	First round	#1 Pittsburgh	L 62–72
2010	#16	First round	#1 Kentucky	L 71–100
2017	#13	First round	#4 Florida	L 65–80

=== NCAA Division II tournament results ===
The Buccaneers have appeared in the NCAA Division II Tournament one time. Their record is 1–1.

Year	Round	Opponent	Result
1957	Regional semifinals Regional Finals	Centenary; Kentucky Wesleyan	W 62–61; L 73–84

=== NAIA tournament results ===
The Buccaneers have appeared in the NAIA Tournament three times. Their combined record is 0–3.

Year	Round	Opponent	Result
1953	First round	Arizona State	L 79–81
1954	First round	Southwest Missouri State	L 72–77
1956	First round	Gustavus Adolphus	L 60–80

=== NIT results ===
The Buccaneers have appeared in the National Invitation Tournament (NIT) two times. Their combined record is 0–2.

Year	Round	Opponent	Result
1983	First round	Vanderbilt	L 73–79
2007	First round	Clemson	L 57–64

=== Vegas 16 results ===
The Buccaneers have appeared in the Vegas 16 one time. Their record is 1–1.

Year	Round	Opponent	Result
2016	Quarterfinals; Semifinals	Louisiana Tech; Oakland	W 88–83; L 81–104

=== CIT results ===
The Buccaneers have appeared in the CollegeInsider.com Postseason Tournament (CIT) three times. Their combined record is 3–3.

Year	Round	Opponent	Result
2011	First round Quarterfinals; Semifinals	Furman; Ohio; Iona	W 76–63; W 82–73; L 80–83
2014	First round Second Round	Chattanooga; Towson	W 79–66; L 77–83
2019	First round	Green Bay	L 94–102

== Retired numbers ==
ETSU has retired four jersey numbers.

East Tennessee State Buccaneers retired numbers
No.	Player	Career
5	Tim Smith	2002–2006
11	Greg Dennis	1987–1992
22	Keith "Mister" Jennings	1987–1991
22	Tommy Woods	1963–1967
24	Calvin Talford	1988–1992

== Record home crowds ==
Top 8 all-time home crowds to attend an ETSU basketball game in Johnson City.

Rank	Attendance	Event	Date
1	12,884	Chattanooga vs. ETSU	Feb. 4, 1991
2	12,240	NC State vs. ETSU	Dec. 29, 1990
3	12,208	VMI vs. ETSU	Feb. 25, 1991
4	11,341	Southern Mississippi vs. ETSU	Dec. 7, 1991
5	11,189	Appalachian State vs. ETSU	Feb. 1, 1992
6	10,727	Chattanooga vs. ETSU	Jan. 20, 1992
7	10,607	Appalachian State vs. ETSU	Jan. 5, 1991
8	10,475	Appalachian State vs. ETSU	Feb. 17, 1990

== ETSU players in the NBA and ABA ==
3 players from ETSU have played in the NBA & ABA and a total of 8 players have been drafted.

Player	Draft Year	Career
Tommy Woods	Undrafted	1967-1968
Skeeter Swift	1969	1969–1974
Keith "Mister" Jennings	Undrafted	1992–1995
