= The Citadel Bulldogs basketball statistical leaders =

The Citadel Bulldogs basketball statistical leaders are individual statistical leaders of The Citadel Bulldogs basketball program in various categories, including points, rebounds, assists, steals, and blocks. Within those areas, the lists identify single-game, single-season, and career leaders. The Bulldogs represent The Citadel in the NCAA's Southern Conference.

The Citadel began competing in intercollegiate basketball in 1900. However, the school's record book does not generally list records from before the 1950s, as records from before this period are often incomplete and inconsistent. Since scoring was much lower in this era, and teams played much fewer games during a typical season, it is likely that few or no players from this era would appear on these lists anyway.

The NCAA did not officially record assists as a stat until the 1983–84 season, and blocks and steals until the 1985–86 season, but The Citadel's record books includes players in these stats before these seasons. These lists are updated through the end of the 2020–21 season.

== Scoring ==
Career
| Rk | Player | Points | Seasons |
|---|---|---|---|
| 1 | Cameron Wells | 2,049 | 2007–08 2008–09 2009–10 2010–11 |
| 2 | Regan Truesdale | 1,661 | 1981–82 1982–83 1983–84 1984–85 |
| 3 | Zane Najdawi | 1,634 | 2015–16 2016–17 2017–18 2018–19 |
| 4 | Art Musselman | 1,506 | 1956–57 1957–58 1958–59 1959–60 |
| 5 | Rick Swing | 1,431 | 1975–76 1976–77 1977–78 1978–79 |
| 6 | Tom Slawson | 1,407 | 1976–77 1977–78 1978–79 1979–80 |
| 7 | Hayden Brown | 1,402 | 2017–18 2018–19 2019–20 2020–21 2021–22 |
| 8 | Ashton Moore | 1,399 | 2011–12 2012–13 2013–14 2014–15 |
| | Gary Daniels | 1,399 | 1959–60 1960–61 1961–62 |
| 10 | Mike Groselle | 1,359 | 2009–10 2010–11 2011–12 2012–13 |

Season
| Rk | Player | Points | Season |
|---|---|---|---|
| 1 | Regan Truesdale | 624 | 1984–85 |
| 2 | Regan Truesdale | 617 | 1983–84 |
| 3 | Lew Stallworth | 586 | 2018–19 |
| 4 | Gary Daniels | 581 | 1960–61 |
| 5 | Hayden Brown | 563 | 2021–22 |
| 6 | Rodney McKeever | 553 | 1975–76 |
| 7 | Cameron Wells | 552 | 2010–11 |
| 8 | Cameron Wells | 551 | 2009–10 |
| 9 | Gary Daniels | 550 | 1961–62 |
| 10 | Preston Parks | 543 | 2016–17 |

Single game
| Rk | Player | Points | Season | Opponent |
|---|---|---|---|---|
| 1 | Jerry Varn | 51 | 1952–53 | Piedmont |
| 2 | Regan Truesdale | 41 | 1983–84 | Marshall |
| 3 | Patrick Elmore | 40 | 1989–90 | ETSU |
| 4 | Rodney McKeever | 39 | 1974–75 | UNC Wilmington |
| 5 | Ted Mosay | 38 | 1990–91 | Youngstown State |
| | Regan Truesdale | 38 | 1983–84 | Furman |
| | Rodney McKeever | 38 | 1975–76 | Furman |
| | John Sutor | 38 | 1971–72 | Chattanooga |
| | Gary Daniels | 38 | 1960–61 | Georgia Southern |
| 10 | Hayden Brown | 37 | 2020–21 | Chattanooga |
| | Lew Stallworth | 37 | 2018–19 | Western Carolina |
| | Zane Najdawi | 37 | 2017–18 | Chattanooga |
| | Preston Parks | 37 | 2016–17 | Samford |
| | Patrick Elmore | 37 | 1988–89 | Liberty |

== Rebounds ==
Career
| Rk | Player | Rebounds | Seasons |
|---|---|---|---|
| 1 | J'Mel Everhart | 823 | 2003–04 2004–05 2005–06 2006–07 |
| 2 | Hayden Brown | 748 | 2017–18 2018–19 2019–20 2020–21 2021–22 |
| 3 | Mike Groselle | 739 | 2009–10 2010–11 2011–12 2012–13 |
| 4 | Zane Najdawi | 736 | 2015–16 2016–17 2017–18 2018–19 |
| 5 | Regan Truesdale | 688 | 1981–82 1982–83 1983–84 1984–85 |
| 6 | Matt Newman | 666 | 1994–95 1995–96 1996–97 1997–98 |
| 7 | Cameron Wells | 657 | 2007–08 2008–09 2009–10 2010–11 |
| 8 | Cliff Washburn | 632 | 1998–99 1999–00 2000–01 2001–02 |
| 9 | Demetrius Nelson | 626 | 2004–05 2005–06 2006–07 2007–08 2008–09 |
| 10 | Richard Johnson | 611 | 1972–73 1973–74 1974–75 1975–76 |

Season
| Rk | Player | Rebounds | Season |
|---|---|---|---|
| 1 | Quentin Millora-Brown | 300 | 2023–24 |
| 2 | Mike Groselle | 288 | 2011–12 |
| 3 | Hayden Brown | 286 | 2021–22 |
| 4 | John Sutor | 275 | 1970–71 |
| 5 | Regan Truesdale | 252 | 1984–85 |
| | Hayden Brown | 252 | 2020–21 |
| 7 | J'Mel Everhart | 236 | 2005–06 |
| 8 | Mike Groselle | 228 | 2012–13 |
| 9 | Regan Truesdale | 227 | 1983–84 |
| | Patrick Elmore | 227 | 1989–90 |

Single game
| Rk | Player | Rebounds | Season | Opponent |
|---|---|---|---|---|
| 1 | Hayden Brown | 21 | 2020–21 | Columbia International |
| 2 | Patrick Elmore | 20 | 1989–90 | Davidson |
| 3 | Hayden Brown | 19 | 2021–22 | Samford |
| | Mike Groselle | 19 | 2011–12 | CofC |
| | Alan Puckett | 19 | 1998–99 | VMI |
| 6 | Regan Truesdale | 18 | 1984–85 | South Carolina |
| | Hayden Brown | 18 | 2021–22 | East Tennessee State |
| | Hayden Brown | 18 | 2021–22 | Furman |
| 9 | Winston Hill | 17 | 2023–24 | North Carolina A&T |
| | Hayden Brown | 17 | 2021–22 | East Tennessee State |
| | Hayden Brown | 17 | 2021–22 | Presbyterian |
| | Hayden Brown | 17 | 2020–21 | Western Carolina |
| | Virgil Stevens | 17 | 1997–98 | Columbia |

== Assists ==
Career
| Rk | Player | Assists | Seasons |
|---|---|---|---|
| 1 | Cameron Wells | 485 | 2007–08 2008–09 2009–10 2010–11 |
| 2 | Kevin Hammack | 457 | 2002–03 2003–04 2004–05 2005–06 2006–07 |
| 3 | Marshall Harris III | 438 | 2011–12 2012–13 2013–14 2014–15 |
| 4 | Jimmy Tharpe | 387 | 1982–83 1983–84 1984–85 1985–86 |
| 5 | Leon Bryant | 361 | 1985–86 1986–87 1987–88 1988–89 |
| 6 | Zach Urbanus | 353 | 2007–08 2008–09 2009–10 2010–11 |
| 7 | Warren Sledge | 322 | 2013–14 2014–15 2015–16 2016–17 |
| 8 | Ashton Moore | 321 | 2011–12 2012–13 2013–14 2014–15 |
| 9 | Johnny Smith | 319 | 1986–87 1987–88 1988–89 1989–90 |
| 10 | Lamar Wright | 309 | 1990–91 1991–92 1992–93 1993–94 |

Season
| Rk | Player | Assists | Season |
|---|---|---|---|
| 1 | Lew Stallworth | 181 | 2018–19 |
| 2 | Jimmy Tharpe | 179 | 1985–86 |
| 3 | P.J. Boutte | 175 | 2015–16 |
| 4 | Tyson Batiste | 160 | 2019–20 |
| 5 | Marshall Harris III | 155 | 2012–13 |
| 6 | Johnny Smith | 153 | 1989–90 |
| 7 | Frankie Johnson | 138 | 2017–18 |
| | Cameron Wells | 138 | 2010–11 |
| 9 | Kevin Hammack | 134 | 2002–03 |
| 10 | Cameron Wells | 132 | 2009–10 |

Single game
| Rk | Player | Assists | Season | Opponent |
|---|---|---|---|---|
| 1 | Lew Stallworth | 13 | 2018–19 | Johnson (Fla.) |
| 2 | Lew Stallworth | 12 | 2018–19 | UNCG |
| | Lew Stallworth | 12 | 2018–19 | High Point |
| | Marshall Harris III | 12 | 2013–14 | Georgia Southern |
| 5 | Tyler Moffe | 11 | 2020–21 | Presbyterian |
| | Tyson Batiste | 11 | 2019–20 | Southeast Missouri |
| | Frankie Johnson | 11 | 2017–18 | Chattanooga |
| | P.J. Boutte | 11 | 2015–16 | Air Force |
| | P.J. Boutte | 11 | 2015–16 | MA Christian |
| | Ashton Moore | 11 | 2014–15 | ETSU |
| | Bryan Patton | 11 | 1997–98 | Anderson |
| | Todd Holstein | 11 | 1990–91 | Youngstown State |

== Steals ==
Career
| Rk | Player | Steals | Seasons |
|---|---|---|---|
| 1 | Kevin Hammack | 223 | 2002–03 2003–04 2004–05 2005–06 2006–07 |
| 2 | Cameron Wells | 187 | 2007–08 2008–09 2009–10 2010–11 |
| 3 | Lamar Wright | 141 | 1990–91 1991–92 1992–93 1993–94 |
| 4 | Chad Leonard | 137 | 1992–93 1993–94 1994–95 |
| 5 | Johnny Smith | 132 | 1986–87 1987–88 1988–89 1989–90 |
| | Jimmy Tharpe | 132 | 1982–83 1983–84 1984–85 1985–86 |
| 7 | Mike Roy | 130 | 1997–98 1998–99 1999–00 2000–01 |
| | Regan Truesdale | 130 | 1981–82 1982–83 1983–84 1984–85 |
| 9 | Alan Puckett | 118 | 1998–99 1999–00 2000–01 2001–02 |
| 10 | Quayson Williams | 117 | 2015–16 2016–17 2017–18 2018–19 |

Season
| Rk | Player | Steals | Season |
|---|---|---|---|
| 1 | Chad Leonard | 68 | 1994–95 |
| 2 | Preston Parks | 60 | 2016–17 |
| 3 | Frankie Johnson | 57 | 2017–18 |
| | Kevin Hammack | 57 | 2006–07 |
| 5 | Kevin Hammack | 56 | 2004–05 |
| 6 | Kevin Hammack | 55 | 2003–04 |
| | Jimmy Tharpe | 55 | 1985–86 |
| 8 | Randy Nesbit | 54 | 1979–80 |
| | Elijah Morgan | 54 | 2022–23 |
| 10 | Johnny Smith | 52 | 1989–90 |

Single game
| Rk | Player | Steals | Season | Opponent |
|---|---|---|---|---|
| 1 | Elijah Morgan | 9 | 2023–24 | VMI |
| 2 | Preston Parks | 8 | 2016–17 | Johnson |
| | Kevin Hammack | 8 | 2004–05 | Navy |
| 4 | Kevin Hammack | 7 | 2006–07 | Southern Cal |
| | Kenny Milford | 7 | 2001–02 | Western Carolina |
| | Mike Roy | 7 | 1998–99 | Toccoa Falls |
| | Chad Leonard | 7 | 1994–95 | Clemson |
| 8 | Aaron Ekwere | 6 | 2026–27 | Virginia Lynchburg |
| | Preston Parks | 6 | 2016–17 | Wofford |
| | Mike Groselle | 6 | 2011–12 | Western Carolina |
| | Mike Groselle | 6 | 2011–12 | Davidson |
| | Matt Davis | 6 | 2005–06 | Savannah State |
| | Kevin Hammack | 6 | 2002–03 | Appalachian State |
| | Kenny Milford | 6 | 2001–02 | Emmanuel |
| | Travis Cantrell | 6 | 2001–02 | VMI |
| | Mike Roy | 6 | 2000–01 | Furman |

== Blocks ==
Career
| Rk | Player | Blocks | Seasons |
|---|---|---|---|
| 1 | Kirill Misyuchenko | 215 | 1995–96 1996–97 1997–98 |
| 2 | Zane Najdawi | 199 | 2015–16 2016–17 2017–18 2018–19 |
| 3 | Stephen Clark | 195 | 2019–20 2020–21 2021–22 2022–23 |
| 4 | Gregg Jones | 148 | 1999–00 2000–01 2001–02 2002–03 |
| 5 | Matt Newman | 114 | 1994–95 1995–96 1996–97 1997–98 |
| 6 | Shawn Brown | 103 | 1981–82 1982–83 1983–84 1984–85 |
| 7 | Robert Dalley | 77 | 1987–88 1988–89 1989–90 1991–92 |
| 8 | Scott Van Schaardenburg | 76 | 1989–90 1990–91 1991–92 1992–93 |
| 9 | J'Mel Everhart | 74 | 2003–04 2004–05 2005–06 2006–07 |
| 10 | Max Mombollet | 70 | 2000–01 2001–02 2002–03 2003–04 |
| | Augustus McDowell | 70 | 1990–91 1991–92 1992–93 1993–94 |

Season
| Rk | Player | Blocks | Season |
|---|---|---|---|
| 1 | Kirill Misyuchenko | 83 | 1996–97 |
| 2 | Stephen Clark | 75 | 2021–22 |
| 3 | Kirill Misyuchenko | 67 | 1997–98 |
| 4 | Kirill Misyuchenko | 65 | 1995–96 |
| 5 | Zane Najdawi | 60 | 2015–16 |
| 6 | Zane Najdawi | 59 | 2018–19 |
| 7 | Stephen Clark | 58 | 2022–23 |
| 8 | Gregg Jones | 47 | 2002–03 |
| | Quentin Millora-Brown | 47 | 2023–24 |
| 10 | Warren McLendon | 46 | 2004–05 |
| | Stephen Clark | 46 | 2020–21 |

Single game
| Rk | Player | Blocks | Season | Opponent |
|---|---|---|---|---|
| 1 | Kirill Misyuchenko | 10 | 1996–97 | Wingate |
| 2 | Kirill Misyuchenko | 8 | 1995–96 | Georgia Southern |
| | Scott Van Schaardenburg | 8 | 1990–91 | Duke |
| 4 | Zane Najdawi | 7 | 2018–19 | Samford |
| 5 | Quentin Millora-Brown | 6 | 2023–24 | Charleston |
| | Stephen Clark | 6 | 2021–22 | Western Carolina |
| | Zane Najdawi | 6 | 2018–19 | Johnson (Fla.) |
| | Zane Najdawi | 6 | 2017–18 | Western Carolina |
| | Zane Najdawi | 6 | 2015–16 | ETSU |
| | P.J. Horgan | 6 | 2014–15 | Chattanooga |
| | Kirill Misyuchenko | 6 | 1997–98 | Francis Marion |
| | Kirill Misyuchenko | 6 | 1996–97 | Charleston Southern |
| | Kirill Misyuchenko | 6 | 1995–96 | Chattanooga |
| | Kirill Misyuchenko | 6 | 1995–96 | Western Carolina |
