= 1986 Southern Conference men's basketball tournament =

1986 men's basketball tournament in Asheville, North Carolina

- Classification: Division I
- Season: 1985–86
- Teams: 8
- Site: Asheville Civic Center; Asheville, NC
- Champions: Davidson (5th title)
- Winning coach: Bobby Hussey (1st title)

1985–86 Southern Conference men's basketball standings
	Conf.				Overall
Team	W		L	PCT	W		L	PCT
Chattanooga	12	–	4	.750	21	–	10	.677
Davidson†	10	–	6	.625	20	–	11	.645
Marshall	10	–	6	.625	19	–	11	.633
Appalachian State	9	–	7	.563	17	–	12	.586
Western Carolina	8	–	8	.500	14	–	14	.500
East Tennessee State	8	–	8	.500	13	–	16	.448
VMI	5	–	11	.313	11	–	17	.393
The Citadel	5	–	11	.313	10	–	18	.357
Furman	5	–	11	.313	10	–	17	.370
† Tournament winner As of April 30, 1986; Rankings from AP poll

The 1986 Southern Conference men's basketball tournament took place from February 28 – March 2, 1986, at the Asheville Civic Center in Asheville, North Carolina. The Davidson Wildcats, led by head coach Bobby Hussey, won their fifth Southern Conference title and received the automatic berth to the 1986 NCAA tournament.

== Format ==
The top eight finishers of the conference's nine members were eligible for the tournament. Teams were seeded based on conference winning percentage. The tournament used a preset bracket consisting of three rounds.

== Bracket ==
Quarterfinals; February 28
1	Chattanooga	69
8	The Citadel	66
4	Appalachian State	63*
5	Western Carolina	62
2	Davidson	71
7	VMI	62
3	Marshall	80
6	East Tennessee St.	82

Semifinals; March 1
1	Chattanooga	68
4	Appalachian State	57
2	Davidson	74
6	East Tennessee St.	65

Finals; March 2
1	Chattanooga	40
2	Davidson	42

* Overtime game

== See also ==
- List of Southern Conference men's basketball champions
