= Capital Classic =

Capital Classic may refer to:

- Capital Classic (all-star game), annual American high school all-star basketball game
- Chesapeake Energy Capital Classic, basketball rivalry between Marshall University and West Virginia University

== See also ==
- Capital City Classic, basketball rivalry between Virginia Commonwealth University and University of Richmond
