= Gary Daniels (disambiguation) =

Gary Daniels may refer to:

- Gary Daniels (born 1963), English actor & kickboxer
- Gary L. Daniels (born 1954), American politician
- Gary Daniels (basketball) (1940-2017), American basketball player
- Gary Daniels, football player for 2001 Oregon Ducks football team
- Gary Daniels, baseball player who was part of the 1990 Major League Baseball draft
- Gary Daniels, one of the founders of WCST (AM)
