= 1986–87 Marshall Thundering Herd men's basketball team =

American college basketball season

1986–87 Marshall Thundering Herd men's basketball

SoCon regular season champions SoCon tournament champions

NCAA tournament, First Round (vacated)
- Conference: Southern Conference
- Record: 25–6 (15–1 SoCon)
- Head coach: Rick Huckabay (4th season)
- Assistant coaches: Dan Bell; Henry Dickerson; John Lyles
- Home arena: Cam Henderson Center

1986–87 Southern Conference men's basketball standings
	Conf.				Overall
Team	W		L	PCT	W		L	PCT
Marshall †	15	–	1	.938	25	–	6	.806
Chattanooga	14	–	2	.875	21	–	8	.724
Davidson	12	–	4	.750	20	–	10	.667
Furman	10	–	6	.625	17	–	12	.586
The Citadel	6	–	10	.375	13	–	15	.464
VMI	5	–	11	.313	11	–	17	.393
Western Carolina	4	–	12	.250	10	–	19	.345
Appalachian State	3	–	13	.188	7	–	21	.250
East Tennessee State	3	–	13	.188	7	–	21	.250
† 1987 Southern Conference tournament winner As of April 30, 1987; Rankings from AP poll

The 1986–87 Marshall Thundering Herd men's basketball team represented Marshall University during the 1986–87 NCAA Division I men's basketball season. The Thundering Herd, led by fourth-year head coach Rick Huckabay, played their home games at the Cam Henderson Center as members of the Southern Conference. They finished the season 25–6, 15–1 in SoCon play to finish in first place. They defeated Appalachian State, Furman, and Davidson to become champions of the SoCon tournament. They received the SoCon's automatic bid to the NCAA tournament where, as a No. 13 seed, they lost to No. 4 seed TCU in the first round. Marshall's participation in the NCAA Tournament was later vacated by the NCAA.

== Roster ==
1986–87 Marshall Thundering Herd men's basketball team
Players
Coaches

Pos.	#	Name	Height	Weight	Year	Hometown
F	00	Rodney Holden	6 ft 7 in (2.01 m)	205 lb (93 kg)	Jr	Atlanta, Georgia
G	3	Skip Henderson	6 ft 2 in (1.88 m)	190 lb (86 kg)	Jr	Cartersville, Georgia
G	15	John Humphrey	6 ft 5 in (1.96 m)	180 lb (82 kg)	So	Huntsville, Alabama
F	23	Kevin Staples	6 ft 6 in (1.98 m)	200 lb (91 kg)	So	Logan, West Virginia
G	24	Brian Fish	6 ft 4 in (1.93 m)	185 lb (84 kg)	So	Seymour, Indiana
F	25	Pete Brown	6 ft 6 in (1.98 m)	215 lb (98 kg)	So	Sylvania, Ohio
F	31	Dwayne Lewis	6 ft 5 in (1.96 m)	190 lb (86 kg)	Jr	New Orleans, Louisiana
F	35	Tommy Boyd	6 ft 9 in (2.06 m)	215 lb (98 kg)	Jr	Ingomar, Mississippi
C	42	Brian Jointer	6 ft 8 in (2.03 m)	240 lb (109 kg)	Fr	Louisville, Kentucky
F	45	Maurice Bryson	6 ft 6 in (1.98 m)	200 lb (91 kg)	Jr	Charleston, West Virginia
C	52	Tom Curry	6 ft 9 in (2.06 m)	230 lb (104 kg)	Jr	Baton Rouge, Louisiana

Head coach

- Rick Huckabay (Louisiana Tech)

Assistant coach(es)

- Dan Bell (Northwestern State)
- Henry Dickerson (Charleston (WV))
- John Lyles (Louisiana College)

Legend

- (C) Team captain
- (S) Suspended
- (I) Ineligible
- (W) Walk-on
- Injured
- Current redshirt

== Schedule and results ==
Date time, TV	Rank^{#}	Opponent^{#}	Result	Record	Site city, state
Regular season
Nov 29, 1986*		at Kent State	L 69–73	0–1	MAC Center; Kent, OH
Dec 5, 1986*		Radford; Marshall Memorial Invitational	W 72–61	1–1	Cam Henderson Center; Huntington, WV
Dec 6, 1986*		Austin Peay; Marshall Memorial Invitational	L 68–73	1–2	Cam Henderson Center; Huntington, WV
Dec 10, 1986*		Ohio	W 78–68	2–2	Cam Henderson Center; Huntington, WV
Dec 18, 1986*		Florida A&M	W 90–85	3–2	Cam Henderson Center; Huntington, WV
Dec 20, 1986*		Middle Tennessee State	W 87–85	4–2	Cam Henderson Center; Huntington, WV
Dec 22, 1986*		Sam Houston State	W 85–65	5–2	Cam Henderson Center; Huntington, WV
Dec 27, 1986*		at West Virginia rivalry	L 67–69	5–3	WVU Coliseum; Morgantown, WV
Dec 30, 1986*		at Baylor	L 69–73	5–4	Heart O' Texas Fair Coliseum; Waco, TX
Jan 3, 1987*		Nevada	W 86–84	6–4	Cam Henderson Center; Huntington, WV
Jan 10, 1987		Appalachian State	W 85–72	7–4 (1–0)	Cam Henderson Center; Huntington, WV
Jan 12, 1987		East Tennessee State	W 81–62	8–4 (2–0)	Cam Henderson Center; Huntington, WV
Jan 15, 1987		at VMI	W 83–71	9–4 (3–0)	Camron Hall; Lexington, VA
Jan 17, 1987		at The Citadel	W 72–69	10–4 (4–0)	McAlister Field House; Charleston, SC
Jan 19, 1987		at Furman	W 76–72	11–4 (5–0)	Greenville Memorial Auditorium; Greenville, SC
Jan 24, 1987		Chattanooga	W 94–81	12–4 (6–0)	Cam Henderson Center; Huntington, WV
Jan 26, 1987		at Western Carolina	W 75–69	13–4 (7–0)	Ramsey Center; Cullowhee, NC
Jan 29, 1987		VMI	W 104–77	14–4 (8–0)	Cam Henderson Center; Huntington, WV
Jan 31, 1987		at East Tennessee State	W 86–72	15–4 (9–0)	Memorial Center; Johnson City, TN
Feb 2, 1987		Davidson	W 76–67	16–4 (10–0)	Cam Henderson Center; Huntington, WV
Feb 7, 1987		Furman	W 82–61	17–4 (11–0)	Cam Henderson Center; Huntington, WV
Feb 9, 1987		The Citadel	W 96–92	18–4 (12–0)	Cam Henderson Center; Huntington, WV
Feb 11, 1987*		at Morehead State	W 91–83	19–4	Ellis Johnson Arena; Morehead, KY
Feb 14, 1987		Western Carolina	W 104–78	20–4 (13–0)	Cam Henderson Center; Huntington, WV
Feb 16, 1987		at Chattanooga	L 78–82	20–5 (13–1)	McKenzie Arena; Chattanooga, TN
Feb 21, 1987		at Davidson	W 96–90	21–5 (14–1)	Johnston Gym; Davidson, NC
Feb 23, 1987		at Appalachian State	W 75–69 ^{OT}	22–5 (15–1)	Varsity Gymnasium; Boone, NC
SoCon tournament
Feb 27, 1987	(1)	vs. (8) Appalachian State; Quarterfinals	W 76–61	23–5	Asheville Civic Center; Asheville, NC
Feb 28, 1987	(1)	vs. (4) Furman; Semifinals	W 77–64	24–5	Asheville Civic Center; Asheville, NC
Mar 1, 1987	(1)	vs. (3) Davidson; Finals	W 66–64 ^{OT}	25–5	Asheville Civic Center; Asheville, NC
NCAA tournament
Mar 12, 1987*	(13 E)	vs. (4 E) No. 19 TCU; First Round	L 60–76	25–6	Charlotte Coliseum; Charlotte, NC
*Non-conference game. ^{#}Rankings from AP Poll. (#) Tournament seedings in parentheses. E=East.
