= 1987–88 Marshall Thundering Herd men's basketball team =

American college basketball season

1987–88 Marshall Thundering Herd men's basketball

SoCon regular season champions

NIT, First Round
- Conference: Southern Conference
- Record: 24–8 (14–2 SoCon)
- Head coach: Rick Huckabay (5th season)
- Assistant coaches: Dan Bell; Henry Dickerson; John Lyles
- Home arena: Cam Henderson Center

1987–88 Southern Conference men's basketball standings
	Conf.				Overall
Team	W		L	PCT	W		L	PCT
Marshall	14	–	2	.875	24	–	8	.750
Furman	11	–	5	.688	18	–	10	.643
Davidson	9	–	7	.563	15	–	13	.536
East Tennessee State	9	–	7	.563	14	–	15	.483
Chattanooga †	8	–	8	.500	20	–	13	.606
Appalachian State	8	–	8	.500	16	–	13	.552
VMI	6	–	10	.375	13	–	17	.433
The Citadel	5	–	11	.313	8	–	20	.286
Western Carolina	2	–	14	.125	8	–	19	.296
† 1988 SoCon Tournament winner Rankings from AP poll

The 1987–88 Marshall Thundering Herd men's basketball team represented Marshall University during the 1987–88 NCAA Division I men's basketball season. The Thundering Herd, led by fifth-year head coach Rick Huckabay, played their home games at the Cam Henderson Center as members of the Southern Conference. They finished the season 24–8, 14–2 in SoCon play to finish in first place. In the SoCon tournament, they were defeated by Chattanooga in the semifinals. As a regular season conference champion who failed to win their conference tournament, the Thundering Herd received an automatic bid to the National Invitation Tournament, where they lost in the first round to VCU.

== Roster ==
1987–88 Marshall Thundering Herd men's basketball team
Players
Coaches

Pos.	#	Name	Height	Weight	Year	Hometown
F	00	Rodney Holden	6 ft 7 in (2.01 m)	205 lb (93 kg)	Sr	Atlanta, Georgia
G	3	Skip Henderson	6 ft 2 in (1.88 m)	190 lb (86 kg)	Sr	Cartersville, Georgia
G	13	Andy Paul Williamson	6 ft 3 in (1.91 m)	175 lb (79 kg)	Fr	Harts, West Virginia
G	14	Marc Toler	6 ft 3 in (1.91 m)	175 lb (79 kg)	Fr	Clarksville, Tennessee
G	15	John Humphrey	6 ft 5 in (1.96 m)	180 lb (82 kg)	Jr	Huntsville, Alabama
G	22	John Taft	6 ft 1 in (1.85 m)	180 lb (82 kg)	Fr	Huntsville, Alabama
G	24	Brian Fish	6 ft 4 in (1.93 m)	185 lb (84 kg)	Jr	Seymour, Indiana
F	25	Pete Brown	6 ft 6 in (1.98 m)	215 lb (98 kg)	Jr	Sylvania, Ohio
G	33	Andre Cunningham	6 ft 3 in (1.91 m)	170 lb (77 kg)	Fr	Matewan, West Virginia
F	35	Tommy Boyd	6 ft 9 in (2.06 m)	215 lb (98 kg)	Sr	Ingomar, Mississippi
F	45	Maurice Bryson	6 ft 6 in (1.98 m)	200 lb (91 kg)	Sr	Charleston, West Virginia
C	50	Tommy Cassity	6 ft 8 in (2.03 m)	215 lb (98 kg)	Fr	Cadiz, Kentucky
C	52	Tom Curry	6 ft 9 in (2.06 m)	230 lb (104 kg)	Sr	Baton Rouge, Louisiana

Head coach

- Rick Huckabay (Louisiana Tech)

Assistant coach(es)

- Dan Bell (Northwestern State)
- Henry Dickerson (Charleston (WV))
- John Lyles (Louisiana College)

Legend

- (C) Team captain
- (S) Suspended
- (I) Ineligible
- (W) Walk-on
- Injured
- Current redshirt

== Schedule and results ==
Date time, TV	Rank^{#}	Opponent^{#}	Result	Record	Site city, state
Regular season
Dec 4, 1987*		Youngstown State; Marshall Memorial Invitational	W 79–65	1–0	Cam Henderson Center; Huntington, WV
Dec 5, 1987*		Eastern Kentucky; Marshall Memorial Invitational	W 62–61	2–0	Cam Henderson Center; Huntington, WV
Dec 7, 1987*		at Ohio	W 91–77	3–0	Convocation Center; Athens, OH
Dec 11, 1987*		vs. Idaho; Hawaii Tipoff Tournament	W 65–58	4–0	Neal S. Blaisdell Center; Honolulu, HI
Dec 12, 1987*		vs. Hartford; Hawaii Tipoff Tournament	W 78–74	5–0	Neal S. Blaisdell Center; Honolulu, HI
Dec 19, 1987*		Baylor	W 79–68	6–0	Cam Henderson Center; Huntington, WV
Dec 22, 1987*		at Middle Tennessee State	L 80–91	6–1	Murphy Center; Murfreesboro, TN
Dec 27, 1987*		West Virginia rivalry	W 82–72	7–1	Cam Henderson Center; Huntington, WV
Dec 30, 1987*		Kent State	W 82–67	8–1	Cam Henderson Center; Huntington, WV
Jan 2, 1988*		at Nevada	L 76–77	8–2	Lawlor Events Center; Reno, NV
Jan 4, 1988*		at Pepperdine	L 90–99	8–3	Firestone Fieldhouse; Malibu, CA
Jan 9, 1988*		at Morehead State	W 89–87	9–3	Ellis Johnson Arena; Morehead, KY
Jan 11, 1988*		at Virginia Tech	L 74–90	9–4	Cassell Coliseum; Blacksburg, VA
Jan 16, 1988		at Appalachian State	W 88–80	10–4 (1–0)	Varsity Gymnasium; Boone, NC
Jan 18, 1988		at East Tennessee State	L 74–84	10–5 (1–1)	Memorial Center; Johnson City, TN
Jan 21, 1988		at VMI	W 64–62	11–5 (2–1)	Camron Hall; Lexington, VA
Jan 23, 1988		The Citadel	W 87–67	12–5 (3–1)	Cam Henderson Center; Huntington, WV
Jan 25, 1988		Furman	W 88–68	13–5 (4–1)	Cam Henderson Center; Huntington, WV
Jan 30, 1988		at Chattanooga	W 95–94 ^{OT}	14–5 (5–1)	McKenzie Arena; Chattanooga, TN
Feb 1, 1988		Western Carolina	W 103–74	15–5 (6–1)	Cam Henderson Center; Huntington, WV
Feb 4, 1988		VMI	W 95–91 ^{OT}	16–5 (7–1)	Cam Henderson Center; Huntington, WV
Feb 6, 1988		East Tennessee State	W 77–72	17–5 (8–1)	Cam Henderson Center; Huntington, WV
Feb 8, 1988		at Davidson	L 76–79	17–6 (8–2)	Johnston Gym; Davidson, NC
Feb 13, 1988		at Furman	W 70–69 ^{OT}	18–6 (9–2)	Greenville Memorial Auditorium; Greenville, SC
Feb 15, 1988		The Citadel	W 105–78	19–6 (10–2)	Cam Henderson Center; Huntington, WV
Feb 20, 1988		Davidson	W 83–71	20–6 (11–2)	Cam Henderson Center; Huntington, WV
Feb 22, 1988		Appalachian State	W 101–72	21–6 (12–2)	Cam Henderson Center; Huntington, WV
Feb 27, 1988		at Western Carolina	W 86–73	22–6 (13–2)	Ramsey Center; Cullowhee, NC
Feb 29, 1988		Chattanooga	W 93–77	23–6 (14–2)	Cam Henderson Center; Huntington, WV
SoCon tournament
Mar 4, 1988	(1)	vs. (8) The Citadel; Quarterfinals	W 121–78	24–6	Asheville Civic Center; Asheville, NC
Mar 5, 1988	(1)	vs. (5) Chattanooga; Semifinals	L 70–71	24–7	Asheville Civic Center; Asheville, NC
NIT
Mar 16, 1988*		VCU; First Round	L 80–81	24–8	Cam Henderson Center; Huntington, WV
*Non-conference game. ^{#}Rankings from AP Poll. (#) Tournament seedings in parentheses.
