= Regan Truesdale =

American basketball player (born 1963)

Personal information
- Born: July 31, 1963 (age 63) Lancaster, South Carolina, U.S.
- Listed height: 6 ft 4 in (1.93 m)
- Listed weight: 205 lb (93 kg)

Career information
- High school: Andrew Jackson (Kershaw, South Carolina)
- College: The Citadel (1981–1985)
- NBA draft: 1985: undrafted
- Playing career: 1985–1989
- Position: Power forward / center

Career history
- 1985–1986: Kansas City Sizzlers
- 1986–1987: Savannah Spirits
- 1988–1989: Memphis Rockers

Career highlights
- 2× SoCon Player of the Year (1984, 1985); 2× First-team All-SoCon (1984, 1985); No. 33 honored by The Citadel Bulldogs

Regan Truesdale (born July 31, 1963) is an American former college basketball player at The Citadel, The Military College of South Carolina. He was twice named Southern Conference Player of the Year, is the second-leading scorer in The Citadel Bulldogs basketball history, and continues to hold several records at the school. Truesdale was born in Heath Springs, South Carolina, and lives there again now that his basketball career is over.

== College career ==
Truesdale, who is the second leading scorer in Bulldog history as of 2011–12, amassed 1,661 points and 688 rebounds in 109 games. His teams finished 58–55 for a .513 winning percentage. The Bulldogs finished 26–1 at home over Truesdale's junior and senior seasons. An especially notable statistic is that 313 of his 688 rebounds were on the offensive end.

His freshman year he came off of the bench, averaging 2.3 points per game behind leading scorers Felipe de las Pozas and Louie Gilbert. His sophomore year began the prolific scoring for which he became known. Installed as a starter for 19 of the 28 games, Truesdale averaged 13.1 points per game, second on the team behind de las Pozas. In a February 5, 1983 game with eventual national champion NC State, Truesdale scored a game-high 21 points. Truesdale posted his highest field goal percentage in his sophomore campaign at 53.2%.

In his junior season, Truesdale became the focal point of the Bulldog offense, averaging a career high 22.0 points per game, good enough for fourth all-time on The Citadel's list. Truesdale scored 617 points in the 1983–84 campaign, trailing only his effort in his senior season in Bulldog record books. This season resulted in his first Southern Conference Men's Basketball Player of the Year Award. Notable games in his junior season included a January 9, 1984 meeting with Marshall in which he scored a career- and game-high 41 points. He finished 22 of 28 from the free throw line, including 13 of 15 in the first half as the Thundering Herd attempted to contain him with fouls. The game was particularly heated as Marshall head coach Rick Huckabay had told media he thought the Southern Conference should eject The Citadel and military rival VMI in order to improve the conference's RPI ranking, among other disparaging remarks. In front of an especially rowdy Corps of Cadets at McAlister Field House, the Bulldogs upended Marshall 84–76. This game kicked off a 22–game home win streak for the Bulldogs that extended through Truesdale's senior season. Also during his junior season, Truesdale scored a game-high 26 points in a February 4, 1984 match-up with top ranked North Carolina as part of the North–South Doubleheader, which featured college teams from North and South Carolina.

Truesdale's senior season saw him average 21.5 points per game, with a career and all-time Bulldog high of 624 points. Regan earned his second Southern Conference Men's Basketball Player of the Year Award, one of only ten players with this honor in the sixty-year history of the award. He was also named an Honorable Mention All-American by the Associated Press. This season was also the last for legendary Bulldog coach Les Robinson before he took the job at East Tennessee State

=== Statistics ===
Scoring

Season	GP-GS	FGM-A	Points	PPG
1981–82	24–0	22–52	54	2.3
1982–83	28–19	149–280	366	13.1
1983–84	28–28	225–477	617	22.0
1984–85	29–29	242–474	624	21.5
Total	109–76	683–1283	1661	15.2

Career Statistics

Min	3FG	3FGA	Pct.	FT	FTA	Pct.	Off Reb	Def Reb	Reb	A	TO	Blocks	Stls
2934	8	41	.195	377	498	.757	313	375	688	173	242	28	130

== Professional career ==
After his college career, Truesdale played two years in the Continental Basketball Association, one season each with the Kansas City Sizzlers and the Savannah Spirits. He then played a season in New Zealand followed by a season with the World Basketball League's Memphis Rockers.

== Player recognition ==
The records section is accurate through the 2011–12 season.

=== Honors ===
Honored Jersey January 23, 2010
Citadel Hall of Fame (inducted 2003)
Twice Southern Conference Men's Basketball Player of the Year (1984 and 1985)
Honorable Mention AP All-American (1985)

=== Records ===
Category (total), place on Citadel list

Points, Career (1,661), 2nd – passed by Cameron Wells on January 3, 2011 held record for nearly 24 years.
Scoring Average, Career (15.2), 6th
Field Goals, Career (638), 2nd
Field Goals Attempted, Career (1,283), 2nd
Free Throws Made, Career (377), 3rd
Free Throws Attempted, Career (498), 6th
Offensive Rebounds, Career (313), 2nd
Defensive Rebounds, Career (375), 6th
Rebounds, Career (688), 2nd
Double-doubles, Career (22), 1st
30–Point Games (7), 2nd
Steals, Career (130), T-7th
Minutes, Career (2934), 10th
Points, Season (624 in 1984–85), 1st
Points, Season (617 in 1983–84), 2nd
Scoring Average, Season (22.0 in 1983–84), 4th
Scoring Average, Season (21.5 in 1984–85), 6th
Field Goals, Season (242 in 1984–85), 1st

Field Goals, Season (225 in 1983–84), T–2nd
Field Goals Attempted, Season (477 in 1984–85), 2nd
Field Goals Attempted, Season (474 in 1983–840, 3rd
Free Throws Made, Season (161 in 1983–84), 4th
Free Throws Made, Season (140 in 1984–85), 7th
Free Throws Attempted, Season (209 in 1983–84), 5th
Free Throws Attempted, Season (181 in 1984–85), 8th
Offensive Rebounds, Season (107 in 1983–84), 1st
Offensive Rebounds, Season (103 in 1984–85), 2nd
Offensive Rebounds, Season (83 in 1982–83), 8th
Defensive Rebounds, Season (149 in 1984–85), 2nd
Rebounds, Season (252 in 1984–85), 2nd
Rebounds, Season (227 in 1983–84), 4th
Steals, Season (48 in 1984–85), 10th
Points, Game (41) 2nd (vs Marshall, Jan. 9, 1984)
Points, Game (38) T-5th (at Furman, Jan. 19, 1984)
Free Throws Made, Game (22) T-1st (vs Marshall, Jan. 9, 1984)
46 games with more than 20 points
73 games with more than 10 points
