= 1989 Southern Conference men's basketball tournament =

- Classification: Division I
- Season: 1988–89
- Teams: 8
- Site: Asheville Civic Center; Asheville, NC
- Champions: East Tennessee State (1st title)
- Winning coach: Les Robinson (1st title)

1988–89 Southern Conference men's basketball standings
	Conf.				Overall
Team	W		L	PCT	W		L	PCT
Chattanooga	10	–	4	.714	18	–	12	.600
Furman	9	–	5	.643	17	–	12	.586
Appalachian State	8	–	6	.571	20	–	8	.714
East Tennessee State †	7	–	7	.500	20	–	11	.645
The Citadel	7	–	7	.500	16	–	12	.571
Marshall	6	–	8	.429	15	–	15	.500
VMI	5	–	9	.357	11	–	17	.393
Western Carolina	4	–	10	.286	12	–	16	.429
† 1989 SoCon Tournament winner As of April 30, 1988; Rankings from AP poll

The 1989 Southern Conference men's basketball tournament took place from March 3–5, 1989 at the Asheville Civic Center in Asheville, North Carolina. The East Tennessee State Buccaneers, led by head coach Les Robinson, won their first Southern Conference title and received the automatic berth to the 1989 NCAA tournament.

== Format ==
All of the conference's eight members were eligible for the tournament. Teams were seeded based on conference winning percentage. The tournament used a preset bracket consisting of three rounds.

== Bracket ==
Quarterfinals; March 3
1	Chattanooga	72
8	Western Carolina	63
4	East Tennessee State	93
5	The Citadel	89
2	Furman	81
7	VMI	73
3	Appalachian State	69
6	Marshall	83

Semifinals; March 4
1	Chattanooga	73
4	East Tennessee State	76
2	Furman	68
6	Marshall	91

Finals; March 5
4	East Tennessee State	96
6	Marshall	73

== See also ==
- List of Southern Conference men's basketball champions
