= 1987 Southern Conference men's basketball tournament =

1987 college basketball conference tournament

- Classification: Division I
- Season: 1986–87
- Teams: 8
- Site: Asheville Civic Center; Asheville, NC
- Champions: Marshall (3rd title)
- Winning coach: Rick Huckabay (3rd title)

1986–87 Southern Conference men's basketball standings
	Conf.				Overall
Team	W		L	PCT	W		L	PCT
Marshall †	15	–	1	.938	25	–	6	.806
Chattanooga	14	–	2	.875	21	–	8	.724
Davidson	12	–	4	.750	20	–	10	.667
Furman	10	–	6	.625	17	–	12	.586
The Citadel	6	–	10	.375	13	–	15	.464
VMI	5	–	11	.313	11	–	17	.393
Western Carolina	4	–	12	.250	10	–	19	.345
Appalachian State	3	–	13	.188	7	–	21	.250
East Tennessee State	3	–	13	.188	7	–	21	.250
† 1987 Southern Conference tournament winner As of April 30, 1987; Rankings from AP poll

The 1987 Southern Conference men's basketball tournament took place from February 27–March 1, 1987, at the Asheville Civic Center in Asheville, North Carolina. The Marshall Thundering Herd, led by head coach Rick Huckabay, won their third Southern Conference title and received the automatic berth to the 1987 NCAA tournament.

== Format ==
The top eight finishers of the conference's nine members were eligible for the tournament. Teams were seeded based on conference winning percentage. The tournament used a preset bracket consisting of three rounds.

== Bracket ==
Quarterfinals; February 27
1	Marshall	76
8	Appalachian State	61
4	Furman	85
5	The Citadel	78
2	Chattanooga	72
7	Western Carolina	73*
3	Davidson	92
6	VMI	63

Semifinals; February 28
1	Marshall	77
4	Furman	64
3	Davidson	85
7	Western Carolina	76

Finals; March 1
1	Marshall	66*
3	Davidson	64

* Overtime game

== See also ==
- List of Southern Conference men's basketball champions
