= 1985–86 Davidson Wildcats men's basketball team =

American college basketball season

1985–86 Davidson Wildcats men's basketball

Southern Conference tournament champions

NCAA tournament, First Round
- Conference: Southern Conference
- South
- Record: 20–11 (10–6 SoCon)
- Head coach: Bobby Hussey
- Home arena: Johnston Gym

1985–86 Southern Conference men's basketball standings
	Conf.				Overall
Team	W		L	PCT	W		L	PCT
Chattanooga	12	–	4	.750	21	–	10	.677
Davidson†	10	–	6	.625	20	–	11	.645
Marshall	10	–	6	.625	19	–	11	.633
Appalachian State	9	–	7	.563	17	–	12	.586
Western Carolina	8	–	8	.500	14	–	14	.500
East Tennessee State	8	–	8	.500	13	–	16	.448
VMI	5	–	11	.313	11	–	17	.393
The Citadel	5	–	11	.313	10	–	18	.357
Furman	5	–	11	.313	10	–	17	.370
† Tournament winner As of April 30, 1986; Rankings from AP poll

The 1985–86 Davidson Wildcats men's basketball team represented Davidson College in NCAA men's Division I competition during the 1985–86 NCAA Division I men's basketball season. Led by head coach Bobby Hussey, the team played its home games at Johnston Gym. The Wildcats finished second during the Southern Conference regular season and won the Southern Conference tournament to receive an automatic bid to the NCAA tournament – the school's first appearance since 1970. Davidson finished win an overall record of 20–11 (10–6 SoCon).

== Roster ==
1985–86 Davidson Wildcats men's basketball team
Players	Coaches
Pos. / # / Name / Height / Weight / Year / Hometown; G / / Derek Rucker / 6 ft 0 in (1.83 m) / 165 lb (75 kg) / So / Washington, D.C.	Head coach: Bobby Hussey (Appalachian State); Assistant coach(es) Legend: (C) Team captain; (S) Suspended; (I) Ineligible; (W) Walk-on; Injured; Current redshirt; Roster

== Schedule and results ==
Date time, TV	Rank^{#}	Opponent^{#}	Result	Record	Site city, state
Regular season
Dec 4, 1985*		at Wake Forest	L 63–67	0–1	Winston-Salem Memorial Coliseum; Winston-Salem, North Carolina
Dec 18, 1985*		vs. No. 3 Duke	L 52–69	1–2	Charlotte Coliseum; Charlotte, North Carolina
Dec 27, 1985*		at Vanderbilt	L 69–78	2–3	Memorial Gymnasium; Nashville, Tennessee
Dec 28, 1985*		vs. Rice	W 70–47	3–3	Memorial Gymnasium; Nashville, Tennessee
SoCon Tournament
Feb 28, 1986*		vs. VMI; Quarterfinals	W 71–62	18–10	Asheville Civic Center; Asheville, North Carolina
Mar 1, 1986*		vs. East Tennessee State; Semifinals	W 74–65	19–10	Asheville Civic Center; Asheville, North Carolina
Mar 2, 1986*		vs. Chattanooga; Championship game	W 42–40	20–10	Asheville Civic Center; Asheville, North Carolina
NCAA Tournament
Mar 14, 1986*	(16 SE)	vs. (1 SE) No. 3 Kentucky; First Round	L 55–75	20–11	Charlotte Coliseum; Charlotte, North Carolina
*Non-conference game. ^{#}Rankings from AP. (#) Tournament seedings in parentheses. SE=Southeast. All times are in Eastern.
