= 1985 Southern Conference men's basketball tournament =

- Classification: Division I
- Season: 1984–85
- Teams: 8
- Site: Asheville Civic Center; Asheville, NC
- Champions: Marshall (2nd title)
- Winning coach: Rick Huckabay (2nd title)

1984–85 Southern Conference men's basketball standings
	Conf.				Overall
Team	W		L	PCT	W		L	PCT
Chattanooga	14	–	2	.875	24	–	8	.750
Marshall†	12	–	4	.750	21	–	13	.618
The Citadel	11	–	5	.688	18	–	11	.621
Western Carolina	8	–	8	.500	14	–	14	.500
VMI	7	–	9	.438	16	–	14	.533
Appalachian State	7	–	9	.438	14	–	14	.500
Davidson	6	–	10	.375	10	–	20	.333
Furman	4	–	12	.250	7	–	21	.250
East Tennessee State	3	–	13	.188	9	–	18	.333
† Tournament winner As of April 30, 1985; Rankings from AP poll

The 1985 Southern Conference men's basketball tournament took place from March 1–3, 1985 at the Asheville Civic Center in Asheville, North Carolina. The Marshall Thundering Herd, led by head coach Rick Huckabay, won their second Southern Conference title and received the automatic berth to the 1985 NCAA tournament.

== Format ==
The top eight finishers of the conference's nine members were eligible for the tournament. Teams were seeded based on conference winning percentage. The tournament used a preset bracket consisting of three rounds.

== Bracket ==
Quarterfinals; March 1
1	Chattanooga	63
8	Furman	60
4	Western Carolina	63^{OT}
5	VMI	65
2	Marshall	83
7	Davidson	71
3	The Citadel	68
6	Appalachian State	62

Semifinals; March 2
1	Chattanooga	69^{OT}
5	VMI	71
2	Marshall	79
3	The Citadel	68

Finals; March 3
5	VMI	65
2	Marshall	70

== See also ==
- List of Southern Conference men's basketball champions
