= 1988–89 East Tennessee State Buccaneers men's basketball team =

American college basketball season

1988–89 East Tennessee State Buccaneers men's basketball
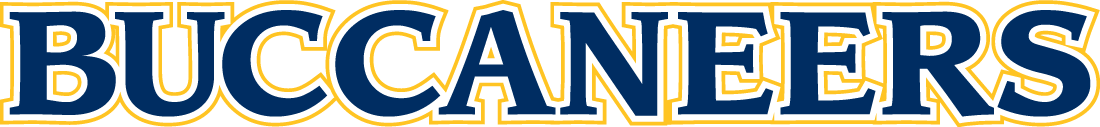

SoCon tournament champions

NCAA tournament, first round
- Conference: Southern Conference
- Record: 20–11 (7–7 SoCon)
- Head coach: Les Robinson (4th season)
- Assistant coach: Alan LeForce
- Home arena: ETSU/Mountain States Health; Alliance Athletic Center

1988–89 Southern Conference men's basketball standings
	Conf.				Overall
Team	W		L	PCT	W		L	PCT
Chattanooga	10	–	4	.714	18	–	12	.600
Furman	9	–	5	.643	17	–	12	.586
Appalachian State	8	–	6	.571	20	–	8	.714
East Tennessee State †	7	–	7	.500	20	–	11	.645
The Citadel	7	–	7	.500	16	–	12	.571
Marshall	6	–	8	.429	15	–	15	.500
VMI	5	–	9	.357	11	–	17	.393
Western Carolina	4	–	10	.286	12	–	16	.429
† 1989 SoCon Tournament winner As of April 30, 1988; Rankings from AP poll

The 1988–89 East Tennessee State Buccaneers basketball team represented East Tennessee State University during the 1988-89 NCAA Division I men's basketball season. The team was led by head coach Les Robinson. The Bucs finished the season 20–11 and 7–7 in Southern Conference play to finish in fourth place. They won the Southern Conference tournament championship in Asheville to receive the automatic berth to the NCAA tournament as the No. 16 seed in the Southeast region. They lost to No. 1 seed Oklahoma, 72–71 in the first round – the second game of the tournament between No. 1 and No. 16 seeds decided by a single point (Georgetown vs. Princeton). This was the first of four consecutive seasons where ETSU qualified for the NCAA Tournament.

== Roster ==
1988–89 East Tennessee State Buccaneers men's basketball team
Players
Coaches

Pos.	#	Name	Height	Weight	Year	Hometown
C	11	Greg Dennis	6 ft 11 in (2.11 m)	—	So
PG	22	Keith Jennings	5 ft 7 in (1.7 m)	155 lb (70 kg)	So	Culpeper, Virginia

Head coach

- Les Robinson

Assistant coach(es)

- Alan LeForce

Legend

- (C) Team captain
- (S) Suspended
- (I) Ineligible
- (W) Walk-on
- Injured
- Current redshirt

== Schedule and results ==
Date time, TV	Rank^{#}	Opponent^{#}	Result	Record	Site city, state
Regular season
*		Erskine	W 111–81	1–0	Memorial Center; Johnson City, Tennessee
*		Bluefield	W 109–77	2–0	Memorial Center; Johnson City, Tennessee
Dec 2, 1988*		at No. 4 Syracuse; Carrier Classic	L 81–120	2–1	Carrier Dome; Syracuse, New York
Dec 3, 1988*		vs. Miami (OH); Carrier Classic	W 79–78	3–1	Carrier Dome; Syracuse, New York
Dec 6, 1988*		Mississippi State	W 91–82	4–1	Memorial Center; Johnson City, Tennessee
Dec 10, 1988*		Tennessee State	W 70–69	5–1	Memorial Center; Johnson City, Tennessee
Dec 16, 1988*		vs. Pacific; Sacramento Holiday Classic	W 88–86	6–1	Hornets Nest; Sacramento, California
Dec 17, 1988*		at Sacramento State; Sacramento Holiday Classic	W 88–86	7–1	Hornets Nest; Sacramento, California
Dec 29, 1988*		vs. Southwest Missouri State; BMA Holiday Classic	L 68–72	7–2	Kemper Arena; Kansas City, Missouri
Dec 30, 1988*		vs. Iona; BMA Holiday Classic	W 92–88	8–2	Kemper Arena; Kansas City, Missouri
Jan 8, 1989		Western Carolina	W 83–74	9–2 (1–0)	Memorial Center; Johnson City, Tennessee
Jan 9, 1989		Chattanooga	L 82–86 ^{OT}	9–3 (1–1)	Memorial Center; Johnson City, Tennessee
Jan 14, 1989		at Furman	L 86–90	9–4 (1–2)	Greenville Memorial Auditorium; Greenville, South Carolina
Jan 21, 1989		Appalachian State	L 70–91	9–5 (1–3)	Memorial Center; Johnson City, Tennessee
Jan 25, 1989		at The Citadel	W 79–70	10–5 (2–3)	Deas Hall; Charleston, South Carolina
Jan 28, 1989		at VMI	W 91–81	11–5 (3–3)	Cameron Hall; Lexington, Virginia
Jan 30, 1989		Marshall	W 101–84	12–5 (4–3)	Memorial Center; Johnson City, Tennessee
Feb 1, 1989*		Wake Forest	W 98–94	13–5	Memorial Center; Johnson City, Tennessee
Feb 4, 1989		at Chattanooga	L 73–74 ^{OT}	13–6 (4–4)	McKenzie Arena; Chattanooga, Tennessee
Feb 6, 1989		at Western Carolina	L 77–93	13–7 (4–5)	Ramsey Center; Cullowhee, North Carolina
Feb 11, 1989		The Citadel	L 75–78	13–8 (4–6)	Memorial Center; Johnson City, Tennessee
Feb 13, 1989		Furman	W 83–81	14–8 (5–6)	Memorial Center; Johnson City, Tennessee
Feb 18, 1989		at Appalachian State	W 89–87 ^{OT}	15–8 (6–6)	Varsity Gymnasium; Boone, North Carolina
Feb 20, 1989*		at Virginia Tech	L 79–82	15–9	Cassell Coliseum; Blacksburg, Virginia
Feb 22, 1989*		Wofford	W 93–65	16–9	Memorial Center; Johnson City, Tennessee
Feb 25, 1989		at Marshall	L 88–97	16–10 (6–7)	Cam Henderson Center; Huntington, West Virginia
Feb 27, 1989		VMI	W 82–80	17–10 (7–7)	Memorial Center; Johnson City, Tennessee
SoCon tournament
Mar 3, 1989*	(4)	vs. (5) The Citadel; SoCon Tournament Quarterfinal	W 93–89	18–10	Asheville Civic Center; Asheville, North Carolina
Mar 4, 1989*	(4)	vs. (1) Chattanooga; SoCon Tournament Semifinal	W 76–73	19–10	Asheville Civic Center; Asheville, North Carolina
Mar 5, 1989*	(4)	vs. (6) Marshall; SoCon tournament championship	W 96–73	20–10	Asheville Civic Center; Asheville, North Carolina
NCAA tournament
Mar 16, 1989*	(16 SE)	vs. (1 SE) No. 4 Oklahoma; First Round	L 71–72	20–11	Memorial Gymnasium; Nashville, Tennessee
*Non-conference game. ^{#}Rankings from AP Poll. (#) Tournament seedings in parentheses. SE=Southeast. All times are in Eastern Time.
