= 1988 Southern Conference men's basketball tournament =

- Classification: Division I
- Season: 1987–88
- Teams: 8
- Site: Asheville Civic Center; Asheville, NC
- Champions: Chattanooga (4th title)
- Winning coach: Mack McCarthy (1st title)

1987–88 Southern Conference men's basketball standings
	Conf.				Overall
Team	W		L	PCT	W		L	PCT
Marshall	14	–	2	.875	24	–	8	.750
Furman	11	–	5	.688	18	–	10	.643
Davidson	9	–	7	.563	15	–	13	.536
East Tennessee State	9	–	7	.563	14	–	15	.483
Chattanooga †	8	–	8	.500	20	–	13	.606
Appalachian State	8	–	8	.500	16	–	13	.552
VMI	6	–	10	.375	13	–	17	.433
The Citadel	5	–	11	.313	8	–	20	.286
Western Carolina	2	–	14	.125	8	–	19	.296
† 1988 SoCon Tournament winner Rankings from AP poll

The 1988 Southern Conference men's basketball tournament took place from March 4–6, 1988 at the Asheville Civic Center in Asheville, North Carolina. The Chattanooga Mocs, led by head coach Mack McCarthy, won their fourth Southern Conference title and received the automatic berth to the 1988 NCAA tournament.

== Format ==
The top eight finishers of the conference's nine members were eligible for the tournament. Teams were seeded based on conference winning percentage. The tournament consisted of three rounds.

== Bracket ==
Quarterfinals; March 4
1	Marshall	121
8	The Citadel	78
4	Davidson	69
5	Chattanooga	83
2	Furman	73
7	VMI	78
3	East Tennessee State	82
6	Appalachian State	73

Semifinals; March 5
1	Marshall	70
5	Chattanooga	71
3	East Tennessee State	60
7	VMI	79

Finals; March 6
5	Chattanooga	75
7	VMI	61

== See also ==
- List of Southern Conference men's basketball champions
