= Mountain State derby =

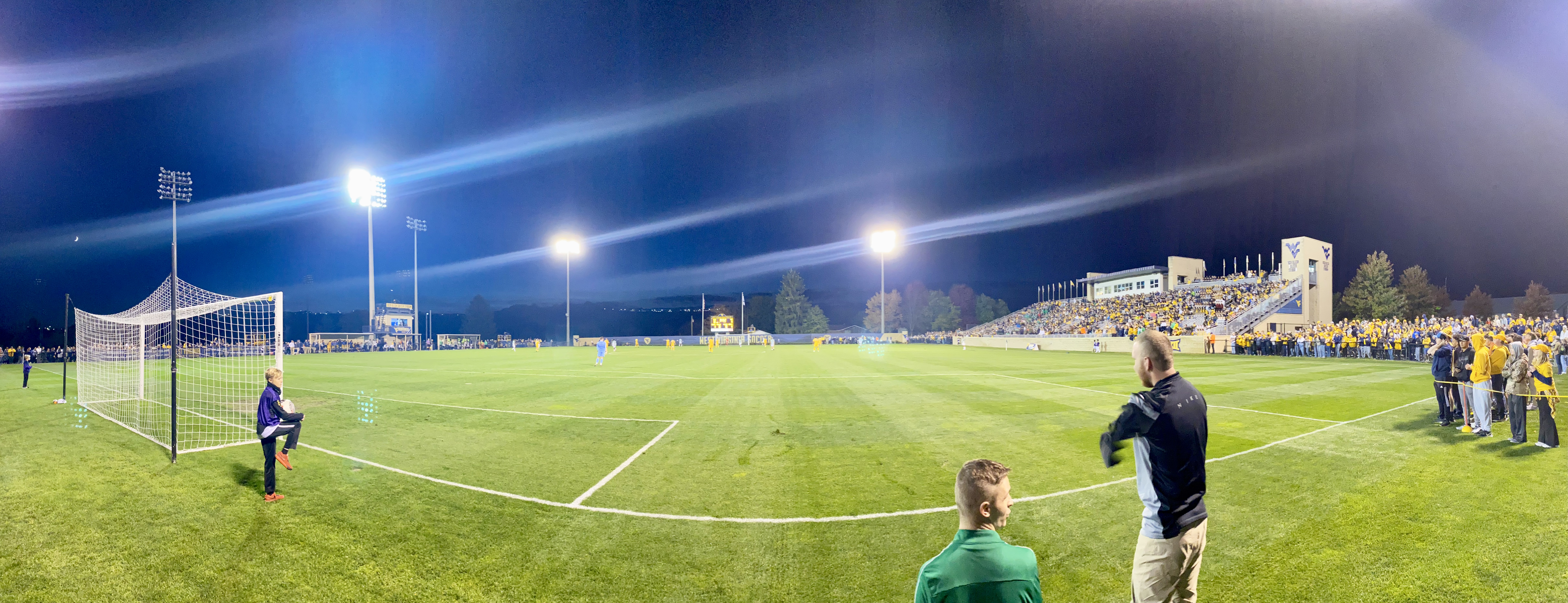
- 2023 Mountain State derby at Dick Dlesk Soccer Stadium.

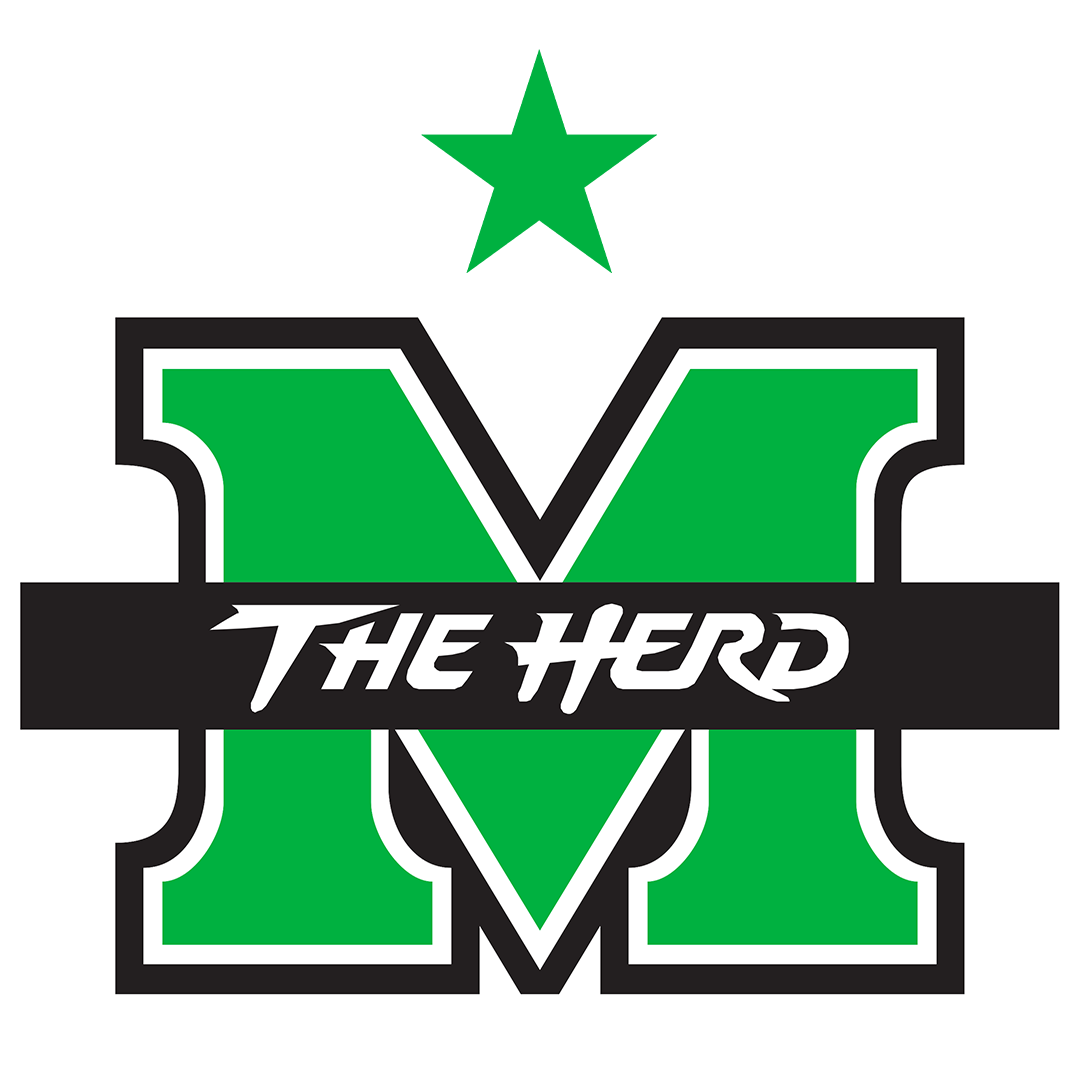
- Marshall Thundering Herd West Virginia Mountaineers
- Sport: Soccer
- First meeting: October 26, 1983; WVU 2 - Marshall 0
- Latest meeting: September 27, 2026; No. 21 WVU 1 - Marshall 1
- Next meeting: 2027

Statistics
- Total meetings: 32
- All-time series: WVU leads, 18–9–5 (.641)
- Largest victory: WVU, 5–0 (1987)
- Longest win streak: WVU, 7 (1986–1992)
- Longest unbeaten streak: WVU, 8 (1985-1992)
- Current unbeaten streak: Marshall, 2 (2025–present)

Locations of Marshall and West Virginia

The Mountain State derby is the name given to the men's soccer games between the Marshall Thundering Herd and the West Virginia Mountaineers, the only NCAA Division I programs in the state of West Virginia.

In 2019, the teams met in the second round of the 2019 NCAA Division I Men's Soccer Tournament as 11th seed Marshall defeated WVU, 2-1, in front of a then-record crowd of 2,126 fans at the Veterans Memorial Soccer Complex. The 2021 edition of the Mountain State Derby set a then-record for highest-attended soccer game ever in West Virginia with 3,033 in the crowd. In the 2022 matchup, #4 Marshall defeated unranked West Virginia 1-0 before a crowd of 2,735 in Huntington.

In 2022, both schools joined the Sun Belt Conference, Marshall as a full member and West Virginia as a men's soccer member, and the rivalry became an annual conference game.

The 2023 regular season edition of the Mountain State Derby set a new record for the largest crowd to ever watch a soccer game in the state of West Virginia at that time with 3,147 people in attendance. The record was reset less than a month later in the Sun Belt Championship in Huntington with 3,151 in attendance.

The two teams met twice in the 2024 season, one in Huntington during the regular season, and one in Morgantown for the Sun Belt Championship. The game in Huntington on November 5, 2024 set a then record for largest attendance with 3,157 people in the crowd.

The 2026 regular season edition of the Mountain State Derby was the highest-attended soccer game ever in West Virginia with 3,307 in the crowd, beating out the 2024 regular season matchup by 150 people.

== Game results ==
| Marshall victories | West Virginia victories | Tie games |

| No. | Date | Location | Winner | Score |
|---|---|---|---|---|
| 1 | October 26, 1983 | Morgantown | West Virginia | 2–0 |
| 2 | October 24, 1984 | Huntington | Marshall | 1–0 |
| 3 | October 30, 1985 | Morgantown | Tie | 0–0^{2OT} |
| 4 | October 27, 1986 | Huntington | West Virginia | 1–0 |
| 5 | October 27, 1987 | Morgantown | West Virginia | 5–0 |
| 6 | October 24, 1988 | Huntington | West Virginia | 3–0 |
| 7 | October 11, 1989 | Morgantown | West Virginia | 1–0 |
| 8 | September 12, 1990 | Huntington | West Virginia | 2–0 |
| 9 | September 11, 1991 | Morgantown | West Virginia | 2–1 |
| 10 | October 14, 1992 | Huntington | West Virginia | 1–0 |
| 11 | September 8, 1993 | Morgantown | Marshall | 2–1 |
| 12 | October 12, 1994 | Huntington | West Virginia | 3–2^{2OT} |
| 13 | September 26, 1995 | Morgantown | West Virginia | 5–2 |
| 14 | September 25, 1996 | Huntington | Marshall | 2–1 |
| 15 | October 29, 1997 | Morgantown | Marshall | 2–1^{OT} |
| 16 | October 13, 1998 | Huntington | West Virginia | 2–0 |
| 17 | September 11, 1999 | Morgantown | West Virginia | 2–1^{OT} |

| No. | Date | Location | Winner | Score |
|---|---|---|---|---|
| 18 | October 17, 2000 | Huntington | Marshall | 2–1 |
| 19 | October 17, 2001 | Morgantown | West Virginia | 3–0 |
| 20 | November 2, 2003 | Charleston | West Virginia | 1–0^{OT} |
| 21 | September 15, 2004 | Morgantown | West Virginia | 2–1^{OT} |
| 22 | November 24, 2019↑ | Huntington | No. 11 Marshall | 2–1 |
| 23 | March 29, 2021 | Morgantown | West Virginia | 1–0 |
| 24 | September 17, 2021 | Huntington | Tie | 2–2^{2OT} |
| 25 | September 24, 2022 | Huntington | No. 4 Marshall | 1–0 |
| 26 | October 18, 2023 | Morgantown | No. 5 West Virginia | 5–2 |
| 27 | November 12, 2023† | Huntington | No. 1 Marshall | 3–2 |
| 28 | November 5, 2024 | Huntington | Tie | 0–0 |
| 29 | November 17, 2024† | Morgantown | Tie | 0–0^{PEN 6-5} |
| 30 | October 31, 2025 | Morgantown | No. 19 West Virginia | 3–0 |
| 31 | November 12, 2025† | Morgantown | No. 12 Marshall | 3–2^{2OT} |
| 32 | September 27, 2026 | Huntington | Tie | 1–1 |
Series: West Virginia leads 18–9–5

† = Conference Tournament game (Sun Belt since 2022)
↑ = NCAA Tournament game
¶ = 0–0 game in knockout tournament decided on penalties. The official score is Marshall 0 (5), West Virginia 0 (6).

== See also ==
- Friends of Coal Bowl – football rivalry between Marshall and West Virginia
- Chesapeake Energy Capital Classic – basketball rivalry between Marshall and West Virginia
