= Friends of Coal Bowl =

American college football rivalry

- Marshall Thundering Herd West Virginia Mountaineers
- Sport: Football
- First meeting: October 28, 1911; West Virginia, 17–15
- Latest meeting: September 1, 2012; West Virginia, 69–34

Statistics
- Total meetings: 12
- All-time series: West Virginia leads, 12–0
- Largest victory: West Virginia, 92–6 (1915)
- Longest win streak: West Virginia, 12 (1911–present)

Locations of Marshall and West Virginia

The Friends of Coal Bowl is the name given to the Marshall–West Virginia football rivalry. It is an American college football rivalry game played by the Marshall Thundering Herd football team of Marshall University and the West Virginia Mountaineers football team of the West Virginia University. The game was sponsored by the Friends of Coal, a coal industry trade group. Planned to be a seven-year series, the Friends of Coal Bowl was organized by the West Virginia Coal Association at the urging of West Virginia Governor Joe Manchin.

The first game of the most recent series was played in Morgantown, West Virginia at Mountaineer Field on September 2, 2006, a 42–10 victory for the Mountaineers. The Governor's Trophy was awarded to the winner of the game. It was presented by the West Virginia Governor and housed at the university which wins the annual matchup. Made within West Virginia from in-state materials, the trophy consists of a carbon base, a glass pedestal, and football-shaped piece of coal enclosed within the glass pedestal. It was designed by Rick Mogielski. The final contracted game in the series was played on September 1, 2012. There are no current plans for a continuation.

== Series history ==
Despite both teams being from the state of West Virginia, hard feelings, politics and Marshall being in a lower division than WVU for a large portion of their history kept the teams from playing on a regular basis before the Friends of Coal Bowl was started. West Virginia University and Marshall University had only played five times in the ninety-five years before 2006.

The 1997 match-up is often thought of as the start of "hard feelings" between the two schools. When Marshall moved to Division 1A in 1997, their first game was against WVU. WVU jumped out to a 28–3 lead in the first half. Marshall led that game 31–28 going to the fourth quarter with Randy Moss leading the show. However, two touchdowns in the final quarter gave WVU the victory. At that point, bad blood arose between the two administrations. WVU claims Marshall backed out of 3 future games. Marshall claims they were never scheduled. The schools couldn't come to an agreement to play again. Former Marshall head coach Bob Pruett tried to get the WVU administration to agree to a series, but WVU stood by their stance of wanting 3 out of 4 games to be played in Morgantown, while Marshall demanded 1 out of every 3 be played in Huntington. Governor Manchin brought the schools together and hashed out a format which included four games in Morgantown, two in Huntington, with the remaining game to be decided by who wins two out of the first three games. The settlement finally got the only two FBS schools in the state to play each other.

In 2006 West Virginia hosted the first match-up of the new series and won 42–10. The 2007 game, played in Huntington, featured West Virginia's first game at Marshall in 92 years. Although Marshall went in with a slim halftime lead, WVU pulled away in the second half winning the game 48–23. West Virginia hosted the next two meetings, defeating Marshall 27–3 in 2008, and 24–7 in 2009. In 2010, WVU and Marshall faced off again in Huntington. Facing a 21–6 fourth-quarter deficit, WVU outscored Marshall 15–0 on drives of 96 and 98 yards in the final 8:28 of the game. In overtime WVU took the lead with a field goal and won 24–21 when Marshall's kicker Tyler Warner missed a 39-yard field goal attempt. The 2011 game, won by West Virginia 34–13, was unique because it featured an over 4-hour weather delay and was called with much of the 4th quarter still to be played. The 2012 game played in Morgantown, the final game in the current series, was won by the Mountaineers 69–34.

College Comparison
	Marshall	West Virginia
Founded	1837	1867
Type	Public	Public
Location	Huntington, WV	Morgantown, WV
Conference	Sun Belt	Big 12
Students	13,204	29,959
School colors		
Nickname	Thundering Herd	Mountaineers
Mascot	Marco the Bison	The Mountaineer
Stadium	Joan C. Edwards Stadium	Milan Puskar Stadium

== Future ==
West Virginia and Marshall have discussed extending the series, but negotiations have resulted in an impasse. Marshall would like to have an alternating site format for revenue purposes, while West Virginia would prefer a "two-for-one" arrangement if one were to be made at all.

On September 10, 2010, Governor Manchin announced that the series would continue, however no further details came from the announcement. In June 2011 WVU athletic director Oliver Luck stated on the West Virginia television program "Decision Makers" that there were no plans to extend the series in the near future. Luck later went on to say "The expansion of the Big East will make it a little more challenging [to schedule Marshall]," says Luck. "Not impossible, but a little more challenging. It very well may be that we can only do a Marshall game every now and then as opposed to every year or four out of five years." When asked if talks had taken place to renew the series WVU's Deputy Director of Athletics Mike Parsons state "No, not really. [We've met about other sports but] there's been no conversations with football."

West Virginia's reluctance to continue the series might be traced to its being bound by the initial Friends of Coal Bowl arrangement as a result of political pressure from the state government in Charleston. It is also debatable as to whether the Friends of Coal Bowl constitutes a true rivalry between the schools, as Marshall has never beaten West Virginia in the twelve-game series and there is a lack of mutual animosity between the Mountaineers and Thundering Herd. West Virginia's move to the Big 12 Conference requires it to play two additional conference games than it had as a member of the Big East, leaving less room for out of conference matchups. In the days leading up to the final scheduled meeting between the two schools, Oliver Luck again reiterated his earlier comments "I think it's been a nice series," Luck said, "but our fan base kind of shrugs their shoulders. My responsibility is to my school and not necessarily to the state or the economic impact of the game.[...] At this point, there's no intent on my part to engage in any discussions because we're still dropping teams because of the Big 12 move," Luck said. "We have to get through that and see where we are with Pitt and Virginia Tech because I would argue they have a much longer history with us, with WVU, than Marshall."

After Luck left WVU for a job with the NCAA, WVU president E. Gordon Gee, citing in-state rivalries his former school (Ohio State) had, said a WVU–Marshall football series "makes sense."

In an interview with Campus Insiders, Marshall head coach Doc Holliday (a former player and assistant at WVU), said, "the game should be played." He also added the series "probably won't happen in my tenure."

== Game results ==
Marshall victories	West Virginia victories

No.	Date	Location	Winner	Score
1	October 28, 1911	Morgantown, WV	West Virginia	17–15
2	October 3, 1914	Morgantown, WV	West Virginia	20–0
3	November 6, 1915	Huntington, WV	West Virginia	92–6
4	October 20, 1923	Morgantown, WV	West Virginia	81–0
5	August 30, 1997	Morgantown, WV	West Virginia	42–31
6	September 2, 2006	Morgantown, WV	#5 West Virginia	42–10
7	September 8, 2007	Huntington, WV	#3 West Virginia	48–23
8	September 27, 2008	Morgantown, WV	West Virginia	27–3
9	October 17, 2009	Morgantown, WV	West Virginia	24–7
10	September 10, 2010	Huntington, WV	#23 West Virginia	24–21^{OT}
11	September 4, 2011†	Morgantown, WV	#19 West Virginia	34–13
12	September 1, 2012	Morgantown, WV	#11 West Virginia	69–34
Series: West Virginia leads 12–0
† Game was called during the fourth quarter following two lightning delays, totaling over four hours

== See also ==
- List of NCAA college football rivalry games
- Chesapeake Energy Capital Classic – men's and women's basketball rivalry between Marshall and West Virginia
- Mountain State derby – soccer rivalry between Marshall and West Virginia
