= 1984–85 Marshall Thundering Herd men's basketball team =

American college basketball season

1984–85 Marshall Thundering Herd men's basketball

SoCon tournament champions

NCAA tournament, First Round
- Conference: Southern Conference
- Record: 21–13 (12–4 SoCon)
- Head coach: Rick Huckabay (2nd season)
- Assistant coaches: Dan Bell; Henry Dickerson; John Lyles
- Home arena: Cam Henderson Center

1984–85 Southern Conference men's basketball standings
	Conf.				Overall
Team	W		L	PCT	W		L	PCT
Chattanooga	14	–	2	.875	24	–	8	.750
Marshall†	12	–	4	.750	21	–	13	.618
The Citadel	11	–	5	.688	18	–	11	.621
Western Carolina	8	–	8	.500	14	–	14	.500
VMI	7	–	9	.438	16	–	14	.533
Appalachian State	7	–	9	.438	14	–	14	.500
Davidson	6	–	10	.375	10	–	20	.333
Furman	4	–	12	.250	7	–	21	.250
East Tennessee State	3	–	13	.188	9	–	18	.333
† Tournament winner As of April 30, 1985; Rankings from AP poll

The 1984–85 Marshall Thundering Herd men's basketball team represented Marshall University during the 1984–85 NCAA Division I men's basketball season. The Thundering Herd, led by second-year head coach Rick Huckabay, played their home games at the Cam Henderson Center as members of the Southern Conference. They finished the season 21–13, 12–4 in SoCon play to finish in second place. They defeated Davidson, The Citadel, and VMI to become champions of the SoCon tournament. They received the SoCon's automatic bid to the NCAA tournament where, as a No. 15 seed, they lost to No. 2 seed VCU in the first round.

== Roster ==
1984–85 Marshall Thundering Herd men's basketball team
Players
Coaches

Pos.	#	Name	Height	Weight	Year	Hometown
F	00	Rodney Holden	6 ft 7 in (2.01 m)	205 lb (93 kg)	Fr	Atlanta, Georgia
G	3	Skip Henderson	6 ft 2 in (1.88 m)	190 lb (86 kg)	Fr	Cartersville, Georgia
F	31	Dwayne Lewis	6 ft 5 in (1.96 m)	190 lb (86 kg)	Fr	New Orleans, Louisiana
F	35	Tommy Boyd	6 ft 9 in (2.06 m)	215 lb (98 kg)	Fr	Ingomar, Mississippi
F	45	Maurice Bryson	6 ft 6 in (1.98 m)	200 lb (91 kg)	Fr	Charleston, West Virginia
C	52	Tom Curry	6 ft 9 in (2.06 m)	230 lb (104 kg)	Fr	Baton Rouge, Louisiana

Head coach

- Rick Huckabay (Louisiana Tech)

Assistant coach(es)

- Dan Bell (Northwestern State)
- Henry Dickerson (Charleston (WV))
- John Lyles (Louisiana College)

Legend

- (C) Team captain
- (S) Suspended
- (I) Ineligible
- (W) Walk-on
- Injured
- Current redshirt

== Schedule and results ==
Date time, TV	Rank^{#}	Opponent^{#}	Result	Record	Site city, state
Regular season
Nov 24, 1984*		Charleston (WV)	W 93–80	1–0	Cam Henderson Center (7,532); Huntington, WV
Nov 29, 1984*		vs. Samford; Hawaii Tipoff Tournament	L 62–66	1–1	Neal S. Blaisdell Center (3,357); Honolulu, HI
Nov 30, 1984*		vs. New Orleans; Hawaii Tipoff Tournament	W 98–78	2–1	Neal S. Blaisdell Center (3,357); Honolulu, HI
Dec 1, 1984*		at Hawaii Pacific; Hawaii Tipoff Tournament	W 106–62	3–1	Neal S. Blaisdell Center (105); Honolulu, HI
Dec 8, 1984*		at West Virginia rivalry	L 77–89	3–2	WVU Coliseum (12,507); Morgantown, WV
Dec 10, 1984*		at Fresno State	L 58–63	3–3	Selland Arena (9,727); Fresno, CA
Dec 14, 1984*		Georgia Southern; Marshall Memorial Invitational	W 70–69	4–3	Cam Henderson Center (7,721); Huntington, WV
Dec 15, 1984*		Louisiana Tech; Marshall Memorial Invitational	L 63–69	4–4	Cam Henderson Center (8,446); Huntington, WV
Dec 17, 1984*		Ohio	L 71–76	4–5	Cam Henderson Center (8,469); Huntington, WV
Dec 22, 1984*		Morehead State	W 79–73	5–5	Cam Henderson Center (8,051); Huntington, WV
Dec 28, 1984*		Eastern Michigan	L 62–63	5–6	Cam Henderson Center (9,174); Huntington, WV
Jan 2, 1985*		Delaware State	W 90–62	6–6	Cam Henderson Center (7,509); Huntington, WV
Jan 5, 1985		VMI	L 54–58	6–7 (0–1)	Cam Henderson Center (9,731); Huntington, WV
Jan 7, 1985		at East Tennessee State	W 62–57	7–7 (1–1)	Memorial Center (2,860); Johnson City, TN
Jan 9, 1985*		Lamar	L 67–75	7–8	Cam Henderson Center (7,792); Huntington, WV
Jan 12, 1985		Chattanooga	L 63–64 ^{OT}	7–9 (1–2)	Cam Henderson Center (8,210); Huntington, WV
Jan 14, 1985		at Appalachian State	W 76–57	8–9 (2–2)	Varsity Gymnasium (6,417); Boone, NC
Jan 19, 1985		at Davidson	W 80–74 ^{OT}	9–9 (3–2)	Johnston Gym (2,400); Davidson, NC
Jan 21, 1985		Western Carolina	W 83–69	10–9 (4–2)	Cam Henderson Center (7,512); Huntington, WV
Jan 23, 1985*		at New Orleans	L 74–78	10–10	Lakefront Arena (1,525); New Orleans, LA
Jan 26, 1985		Furman	W 67–60	11–10 (5–2)	Cam Henderson Center (9,568); Huntington, WV
Jan 28, 1985		at VMI	W 65–63	12–10 (6–2)	Camron Hall (1,200); Lexington, VA
Jan 30, 1985		at The Citadel	L 87–92 ^{OT}	12–11 (6–3)	McAlister Field House (2,035); Charleston, SC
Feb 4, 1985		at Furman	W 90–62	13–11 (7–3)	Greenville Memorial Auditorium (1,969); Greenville, SC
Feb 7, 1985		Appalachian State	W 93–82	14–11 (8–3)	Cam Henderson Center (8,223); Huntington, WV
Feb 9, 1985		The Citadel	W 75–62	15–11 (9–3)	Cam Henderson Center (9,180); Huntington, WV
Feb 14, 1985		East Tennessee State	W 81–59	16–11 (10–3)	Cam Henderson Center (8,802); Huntington, WV
Feb 16, 1985		Davidson	W 85–63	17–11 (11–3)	Cam Henderson Center (9,713); Huntington, WV
Feb 21, 1985		at Chattanooga	L 73–80	17–12 (11–4)	McKenzie Arena (9,253); Chattanooga, TN
Feb 25, 1985		at Western Carolina	W 78–68	18–12 (12–4)	Reid Gymnasium (4,015); Cullowhee, NC
SoCon tournament
Mar 1, 1985	(2)	vs. (7) Davidson; Quarterfinals	W 83–71	19–12	Asheville Civic Center (6,864); Asheville, NC
Mar 2, 1985	(2)	vs. (3) The Citadel; Semifinals	W 79–68	20–12	Asheville Civic Center (6,864); Asheville, NC
Mar 3, 1985	(2)	vs. (5) VMI; Championship	W 70–65	21–12	Asheville Civic Center (6,514); Asheville, NC
NCAA tournament
Mar 15, 1985*	(15 W)	vs. (2 W) No. 11 VCU; First Round	L 65–81	21–13	University Arena (11,932); Albuquerque, NM
*Non-conference game. ^{#}Rankings from AP Poll. (#) Tournament seedings in parentheses. W=West.
