= 1987–88 Chattanooga Mocs basketball team =

American college basketball season

1987–88 Chattanooga Mocs men's basketball

SoCon tournament champion

NCAA tournament
- Conference: Southern Conference
- Record: 20–13 (8–8 SoCon)
- Head coach: Mack McCarthy (3rd season)
- Home arena: UTC Arena

1987–88 Southern Conference men's basketball standings
	Conf.				Overall
Team	W		L	PCT	W		L	PCT
Marshall	14	–	2	.875	24	–	8	.750
Furman	11	–	5	.688	18	–	10	.643
Davidson	9	–	7	.563	15	–	13	.536
East Tennessee State	9	–	7	.563	14	–	15	.483
Chattanooga †	8	–	8	.500	20	–	13	.606
Appalachian State	8	–	8	.500	16	–	13	.552
VMI	6	–	10	.375	13	–	17	.433
The Citadel	5	–	11	.313	8	–	20	.286
Western Carolina	2	–	14	.125	8	–	19	.296
† 1988 SoCon Tournament winner Rankings from AP poll

The 1987–88 Chattanooga Mocs basketball team represented the University of Tennessee at Chattanooga as a member of the Southern Conference during the 1987–88 NCAA Division I men's basketball season. Their head coach was Mack McCarthy and the team played their home games at the UTC Arena. After finishing tied for 5th in the conference regular season standings, the Mocs won the SoCon tournament, earning an automatic bid to the 1988 NCAA tournament. Chattanooga was beaten in the opening round by No. 1 seed and eventual National runner-up Oklahoma, 94–66.

== Roster ==
1987–88 Chattanooga Mocs men's basketball team
Players
Coaches

Pos.	#	Name	Height	Weight	Year	Hometown
G	3	Carnell Ross	6 ft 1 in (1.85 m)	190 lb (86 kg)	Fr	Chicago, Illinois
G	5	Larry Stewart	6 ft 3 in (1.91 m)	184 lb (83 kg)	Fr	South Holland, Illinois
G	12	Morris Lyons	6 ft 2 in (1.88 m)	180 lb (82 kg)	Sr	Memphis, Tennessee
F	20	Daren Chandler	6 ft 6 in (1.98 m)	185 lb (84 kg)	So	Starke, Florida
G	22	Patrick Shepphard	6 ft 4 in (1.93 m)	185 lb (84 kg)	Fr	Atlanta, Georgia
G	24	Vincent Ingram	6 ft 3 in (1.91 m)	173 lb (78 kg)	Jr	Martinsville, Virginia
F	30	Shendi Moon	6 ft 6 in (1.98 m)	190 lb (86 kg)	So	Marietta, Georgia
G	32	Mike Collins	6 ft 3 in (1.91 m)	185 lb (84 kg)	Fr	Leavenworth, Kansas
F	34	Vincent Robinson	6 ft 6 in (1.98 m)	190 lb (86 kg)	Jr	Bridgeport, Alabama
F	40	John McCloud	6 ft 7 in (2.01 m)	185 lb (84 kg)	RS Jr	Gary, Indiana
G	41	John Reid	6 ft 4 in (1.93 m)	190 lb (86 kg)	Fr	Chattanooga, Tennessee
F	42	Chris Behrends	6 ft 7 in (2.01 m)	198 lb (90 kg)	Jr	Peoria, Illinois
G	44	Benny Green	6 ft 2 in (1.88 m)	185 lb (84 kg)	RS So	Little Rock, Arkansas
C	50	Ron Spunar	6 ft 10 in (2.08 m)	220 lb (100 kg)	Sr	Ligonier, Indiana
C	51	Lance Fulse	6 ft 6 in (1.98 m)	257 lb (117 kg)	Sr	Fort Meade, Florida
F	52	John Feltman	6 ft 6 in (1.98 m)	185 lb (84 kg)	Fr	Nashville, Tennessee

Head coach

- Mack McCarthy

Assistant coach(es)

Legend

- (C) Team captain
- (S) Suspended
- (I) Ineligible
- (W) Walk-on
- Injured
- Current redshirt

Roster

== Schedule and results ==
Date time, TV	Rank^{#}	Opponent^{#}	Result	Record	Site (attendance) city, state
Regular season
Nov 27, 1987*		vs. Southwest Baptist	W 95–90	1–0	
Nov 28, 1987*		at Hawaii–Hilo	W 85–81	2–0	Afook-Chinen Civic Auditorium; Hilo, Hawaii
Dec 4, 1987*		Maryland-Baltimore County	W 78–67	3–0	UTC Arena; Chattanooga, Tennessee
Dec 5, 1987*		Tennessee State	W 72–65	4–0	UTC Arena; Chattanooga, Tennessee
Dec 7, 1987*		Tennessee Tech	W 95–89	5–0	UTC Arena; Chattanooga, Tennessee
Dec 12, 1987*		at Middle Tennessee	L 76–92	5–1	Murphy Center; Murfreesboro, Tennessee
Dec 15, 1987*		at VCU	L 69–74	5–2	Richmond Coliseum; Richmond, Virginia
Dec 21, 1987*		Texas	W 71–70	6–2	UTC Arena; Chattanooga, Tennessee
Dec 29, 1987*		Yale; Coca-Cola Classic	W 72–54	7–2	UTC Arena (4,712); Chattanooga, Tennessee
Dec 30, 1987*		Southwestern Louisiana	W 83–72	8–2	UTC Arena; Chattanooga, Tennessee
Jan 2, 1988*		vs. UMKC	W 64–55	9–2	
Jan 3, 1988*		at UAB; UAB Classic	L 67–81	9–3	BJCC Coliseum; Birmingham, Alabama
Jan 9, 1988		East Tennessee State	W 88–63	10–3 (1–0)	UTC Arena; Chattanooga, Tennessee
Jan 11, 1988		Appalachian State	W 76–43	11–3 (2–0)	UTC Arena; Chattanooga, Tennessee
Jan 16, 1988		at Davidson	L 65–81	11–4 (2–1)	Johnston Gym; Davidson, North Carolina
Jan 18, 1988		at Furman	L 62–77	11–5 (2–2)	Greenville Memorial Auditorium; Greenville, South Carolina
Jan 21, 1988		at The Citadel	W 77–63	12–5 (3–2)	North Charleston High School; North Charleston, South Carolina
Jan 23, 1988*		at Southern Miss	L 84–98	12–6	Reed Green Coliseum; Hattiesburg, Mississippi
Jan 28, 1988		Western Carolina	W 71–48	13–6 (4–2)	UTC Arena; Chattanooga, Tennessee
Jan 30, 1988		Marshall	L 94–95	13–7 (4–3)	UTC Arena; Chattanooga, Tennessee
Feb 1, 1988		at VMI	L 61–68	13–8 (4–4)	Cameron Hall; Lexington, Virginia
Feb 6, 1988		at Western Carolina	L 65–66	14–8 (5–4)	Ramsey Center; Cullowhee, North Carolina
Feb 11, 1988		Davidson	W 83–77	15–8 (6–4)	UTC Arena; Chattanooga, Tennessee
Feb 13, 1988		at East Tennessee State	L 80–83	15–9 (6–5)	Memorial Center; Johnson City, Tennessee
Feb 15, 1988		at Appalachian State	L 65–67	15–10 (6–6)	Varsity Gymnasium; Boone, North Carolina
Feb 20, 1988		Furman	W 75–55	16–10 (7–6)	UTC Arena; Chattanooga, Tennessee
Feb 22, 1988		The Citadel	L 68–69	16–11 (7–7)	UTC Arena; Chattanooga, Tennessee
Feb 27, 1988		VMI	W 77–70	17–11 (8–7)	UTC Arena; Chattanooga, Tennessee
Feb 29, 1988		at Marshall	L 77–93	17–12 (8–8)	Cam Henderson Center; Huntington, West Virginia
SoCon tournament
Mar 4, 1988*	(5)	vs. (4) Davidson; Quarterfinals	W 83–69	18–12	Asheville Civic Center; Asheville, North Carolina
Mar 5, 1988*	(5)	vs. (1) Marshall; Semifinals	W 71–70	19–12	Asheville Civic Center; Asheville, North Carolina
Mar 6, 1988*	(5)	vs. (7) VMI; Championship game	W 75–61	20–12	Asheville Civic Center; Asheville, North Carolina
NCAA tournament
Mar 17, 1988*	(16 SE)	vs. (1 SE) No. 4 Oklahoma; First Round	L 66–94	20–13	The Omni; Atlanta, Georgia
*Non-conference game. ^{#}Rankings from AP poll. (#) Tournament seedings in parentheses. SE=Southeast. All times are in Eastern Time.
