= Rick Huckabay =

American basketball coach (1945–2006)

Rick Hackabay
Biographical details
- Born: November 25, 1945; Chicago, Illinois, U.S.
- Died: March 10, 2006 (aged 60); Shreveport, Louisiana, U.S.
- Education: Louisiana Tech University

Coaching career (HC unless noted)
- 1967–1969: Haughton HS (LA) (assistant)
- 1969–1974: Rapides HS (LA)
- 1974–1979: Redemptorist HS (LA)
- 1979–1983: LSU (assistant)
- 1983–1989: Marshall

Head coaching record
- Overall: 129–59 (.686)
- Tournaments: 0–3 (NCAA Division I); 0–1 (NIT)

Accomplishments and honors

Championships
- 3 SoCon regular season (1984, 1987, 1988); 3 SoCon tournament (1984, 1985, 1987)

Awards
- SoCon Coach of the Year (1984)

Richard David Huckabay, Sr (November 25, 1945 – March 10, 2006) was an American basketball coach, best known for his years as head coach at Marshall University.

Huckabay was born in Chicago but later moved with his family to Louisiana where he played high school baseball and basketball. He attended Louisiana Tech University and played baseball as a catcher. After graduating, he became a high school baseball and basketball coach in that state. He was the head baseball coach and assistant basketball coach at Haughton HS. In 1969, he became the head baseball coach and assistant basketball coach at Rapides HS, Lecompte, Louisiana. In 1971, Rick became the head basketball coach and led the Rapides Mustangs to their first State Class AA Basketball Championship in 1973 - a team short in height and known as the jolly green midgets. He became the head basketball coach at Redemptorist HS in Baton Rouge, Louisiana. He then became an assistant coach at the Louisiana State University under Dale Brown.

In 1983 he was hired at Marshall, where he compiled a 129–59 record, including three appearances in the NCAA tournament and one in the NIT before resigning in 1989 amid an investigation into recruiting.

Following Huckabay's resignation and a divorce, he chose not to seek another college job, but remained in the Huntington, West Virginia area where he held several high school coaching jobs in the city's Ohio suburbs, in order to remain near his two sons.

After his sons reached adulthood, he returned to Louisiana where he was coaching high school basketball when diagnosed with terminal cancer.

Huckabay was inducted posthumously into the Marshall University Athletic Hall of Fame in 2006.

A documentary of his coaching career at Marshall University entitled "Huck's Herd" was premiered on November 7, 2026 at the Keith Albee Performing Arts Theater in Huntington, WV.

== Head coaching record ==
Record table
Season	Team	Overall	Conference	Standing	Postseason
Marshall Thundering Herd (Southern Conference) (1983–1989)
1983–84	Marshall	25–6	13–3	1st	NCAA Division I first round
1984–85	Marshall	21–13	12–4	2nd	NCAA Division I first round
1985–86	Marshall	19–11	10–6	T–2nd	
1986–87	Marshall	25–6*	15–1	1st	NCAA Division I first round
1987–88	Marshall	24–8	14–2	1st	NIT first round
1988–89	Marshall	15–15	6–8	6th	
Marshall:		129–59 (.686)	70–24 (.745)		
Total:		129–59 (.686)			
National champion Postseason invitational champion Conference regular season champion Conference regular season and conference tournament champion Division regular season champion Division regular season and conference tournament champion Conference tournament champion

* The NCAA vacated Marshall's loss in the NCAA Tournament.
