= Bobby Hussey =

American basketball coach

- Born: April 2, 1940; Seagrove, North Carolina, U.S.
- Died: June 26, 2007 (aged 67); Charlotte, North Carolina, U.S.
- Occupation: Basketball coach
- Spouse: Sandra Hussey
- Children: Bo, Greg
- Parent(s): Rosa, James Bertie

Bobby Hussey (April 2, 1940 – June 26, 2007) was an American college basketball coach for over 30 years. He served as head coach for 20 years at Belmont Abbey College, Davidson College and Virginia Tech, finishing with a career record of 311-268.

The 1963 graduate of Appalachian State University began his head coaching career at Kings Mountain High School in North Carolina where he posted a 67-6 record and won three Southwestern Conference titles in four years. From there he moved on to become head coach at Belmont Abbey College, where he finished with a 179-111 record over 10 seasons, including three NAIA District 26 playoff berths. Each of his last four teams won at least 20 games, highlighted by the 1979-80 squad that finished 29-5.

Hussey gained his first NCAA Division I head coaching position at Davidson College. He won 108 games during his eight seasons with the Wildcats (1981–89), including two 20–win campaigns (1985–86 and 1986–87). His 1986 team won the Southern Conference tournament and advanced to the NCAA Tournament.

Hussey left Davidson to become an assistant coach at Clemson University in 1989. He remained at Clemson from 1989–91 and helped the Tigers to their first-ever ACC regular season title and a Sweet 16 NCAA Tournament appearance.

Hussey served as the lead assistant coach under Bill Foster at Virginia Tech from 1991 to 1997. During that time, the Hokies won the NIT championship in 1995 and advanced to the NCAA Tournament in 1996. Following Foster's retirement, Hussey was promoted to head coach at Virginia Tech in 1997. In two seasons, he compiled a 23–32 record in Blacksburg before being fired.

He returned to Clemson as an assistant coach to Larry Shyatt from 1999 to 2003. Prior to his death, Hussey was a coaching advisor, served as a volunteer coach at Charlotte area high schools, and hosted basketball camps and clinics.

In 2008, Nike renamed its annual basketball tournament featuring elite 15- to 17-year-old basketball players the "Bobby Hussey Memorial Day Classic" in honor of Hussey's contributions to the game.
