= The Citadel Bulldogs basketball, 1985–1989 =

The Citadel Bulldogs basketball teams represented The Citadel, The Military College of South Carolina in Charleston, South Carolina, United States. The program was established in 1900–01, and has continuously fielded a team since 1912–13. Their primary rivals are College of Charleston, Furman and VMI.

== 1984–85 ==
1984–85 The Citadel Bulldogs men's basketball
- Conference: Southern Conference
- Record: 18–11 (11–5 SoCon)
- Head coach: Les Robinson
- Home arena: McAlister Field House

1984–85 Southern Conference men's basketball standings
	Conf.				Overall
Team	W		L	PCT	W		L	PCT
Chattanooga	14	–	2	.875	24	–	8	.750
Marshall†	12	–	4	.750	21	–	13	.618
The Citadel	11	–	5	.688	18	–	11	.621
Western Carolina	8	–	8	.500	14	–	14	.500
VMI	7	–	9	.438	16	–	14	.533
Appalachian State	7	–	9	.438	14	–	14	.500
Davidson	6	–	10	.375	10	–	20	.333
Furman	4	–	12	.250	7	–	21	.250
East Tennessee State	3	–	13	.188	9	–	18	.333
† Tournament winner As of April 30, 1985; Rankings from AP poll

Date time, TV	Opponent	Result	Record	Site city, state
November 24*	Sewanee	W 96–91	1–0	McAlister Field House; Charleston, SC
November 26*	Coker	W 112–85	2–0	McAlister Field House; Charleston, SC
November 28*	at Baptist	W 78–61	3–0	CSU Field House; North Charleston, SC
December 1*	Georgia State	W 93–72	4–0	McAlister Field House; Charleston, SC
December 3*	at South Carolina	L 82–94	4–1	Carolina Coliseum; Columbia, SC
December 8*	Baptist	W 62–53	5–1	McAlister Field House; Charleston, SC
December 15*	at College of Charleston	L 61–70	5–2	John Kresse Arena; Charleston, SC
December 28*	at Southern California; Trojan Classic	L 62–95	5–3	Los Angeles Memorial Sports Arena; Los Angeles, CA
December 29*	vs. UAB; Trojan Classic	L 64–79	5–4	Los Angeles Memorial Sports Arena; Los Angeles, CA
January 3*	Erskine	W 93–91	6–4	McAlister Field House; Charleston, SC
January 5	at Furman	W 83–76	7–4 (1–0)	Greenville Memorial Auditorium; Greenville, SC
January 12	at East Tennessee State	L 90–94 ^{OT}	7–5 (1–1)	Memorial Center; Johnson City, TN
January 14	Furman	W 73–65	8–5 (2–1)	McAlister Field House; Charleston, SC
January 17	at Chattanooga	L 82–91	8–6 (2–2)	McKenzie Arena; Chattanooga, TN
January 19	Appalachian State	W 84–77	9–6 (3–2)	McAlister Field House; Charleston, SC
January 24	East Tennessee State	W 79–67	10–6 (4–2)	McAlister Field House; Charleston, SC
January 26	at Davidson	L 92–102	10–7 (4–3)	Johnston Gym; Davidson, NC
January 30	Marshall	W 92–87 ^{OT}	11–7 (5–3)	McAlister Field House; Charleston, SC
February 1*	vs. No. 13 North Carolina	L 62–83	11–8	Charlotte Coliseum; Charlotte, NC
February 4	Chattanooga	W 71–63	12–8 (6–3)	McAlister Field House; Charleston, SC
February 7	at Western Carolina	W 73–70	13–8 (7–3)	Cullowhee, NC
February 9	at Marshall	L 65–75	13–9 (7–4)	Cam Henderson Center; Huntington, WV
February 12	VMI	W 64–61	14–9 (8–4)	McAlister Field House; Charleston, SC
February 16	Western Carolina	W 91–85	15–9 (9–4)	McAlister Field House; Charleston, SC
February 18	Davidson	W 82–79 ^{OT}	16–9 (10–4)	McAlister Field House; Charleston, SC
February 23	at Appalachian State	L 56–57	16–10 (10–5)	Varsity Gymnasium; Boone, NC
February 25	at VMI	W 69–53	17–10 (11–5)	Cameron Hall; Lexington, VA
1985 Southern Conference men's basketball tournament
March 1	Appalachian State; First Round	W 68–62	18–10	McAlister Field House; Charleston, SC
March 2	vs. Marshall; Second Round	L 68–79	18–11	Asheville Civic Center; Asheville, NC
*Non-conference game. (#) Tournament seedings in parentheses. All times are in Eastern Time.

== 1985–86 ==
1985–86 The Citadel Bulldogs men's basketball
- Conference: Southern Conference
- Record: 10–18 (5–11 SoCon)
- Head coach: Randy Nesbit
- Home arena: McAlister Field House

1985–86 Southern Conference men's basketball standings
	Conf.				Overall
Team	W		L	PCT	W		L	PCT
Chattanooga	12	–	4	.750	21	–	10	.677
Davidson†	10	–	6	.625	20	–	11	.645
Marshall	10	–	6	.625	19	–	11	.633
Appalachian State	9	–	7	.563	17	–	12	.586
Western Carolina	8	–	8	.500	14	–	14	.500
East Tennessee State	8	–	8	.500	13	–	16	.448
VMI	5	–	11	.313	11	–	17	.393
The Citadel	5	–	11	.313	10	–	18	.357
Furman	5	–	11	.313	10	–	17	.370
† Tournament winner As of April 30, 1986; Rankings from AP poll

Date time, TV	Opponent	Result	Record	Site city, state
November 22*	Miami (FL)	L 77–85	0–1	Knight International Center; Miami, FL
November 25*	College of Charleston	L 57–63	0–2	McAlister Field House; Charleston, SC
December 2*	Piedmont	W 92–66	1–2	McAlister Field House; Charleston, SC
December 5*	Morgan State	W 84–73	2–2	McAlister Field House; Charleston, SC
December 9*	Coker	W 111–93	3–2	McAlister Field House; Charleston, SC
December 14*	Baptist	W 78–68	4–2	McAlister Field House; Charleston, SC
December 22*	No. 1 North Carolina	L 51–104	4–3	Charlotte Coliseum; Charlotte, NC
January 6*	at Baptist	L 65–95	4–4	CSU Field House; North Charleston, SC
January 9	at Davidson	L 76–82	4–5 (0–1)	Johnston Gym; Davidson, NC
January 13*	Francis Marion	L 76–83	4–6	McAlister Field House; Charleston, SC
January 16	Chattanooga	L 71–96	4–7 (0–2)	McAlister Field House; Charleston, SC
January 18	at Marshall	L 70–90	4–8 (0–3)	Cam Henderson Center; Huntington, WV
January 20	at VMI	L 64–66	4–9 (0–4)	Cameron Hall; Lexington, VA
January 23	Furman	W 76–72	5–9 (1–4)	McAlister Field House; Charleston, SC
January 25	Davidson	W 64–61	6–9 (2–4)	McAlister Field House; Charleston, SC
January 27	at East Tennessee State	L 70–74	6–10 (2–5)	Memorial Center; Johnson City, TN
January 29	at Furman	L 69–74	6–11 (2–6)	Greenville Memorial Auditorium; Greenville, SC
February 1	at Appalachian State	L 55–65	6–12 (2–7)	Varsity Gymnasium; Boone, NC
February 3	Western Carolina	W 69–68	7–12 (3–7)	McAlister Field House; Charleston, SC
February 5*	South Carolina	L 70–80	7–13	McAlister Field House; Charleston, SC
February 8	VMI	L 76–83	7–14 (3–8)	McAlister Field House; Charleston, SC
February 10	Marshall	L 78–85	7–15 (3–9)	McAlister Field House; Charleston, SC
February 15	East Tennessee State	W 98–90	8–15 (4–9)	McAlister Field House; Charleston, SC
February 17	Appalachian State	L 66–67	8–16 (4–10)	McAlister Field House; Charleston, SC
February 20	UCF	W 72–66	9–16	McAlister Field House; Charleston, SC
February 22	at Western Carolina	L 71–72	9–17 (4–11)	Cullowhee, NC
February 24	at Chattanooga	W 82–75	10–17 (5–11)	McKenzie Arena; Chattanooga, TN
1986 Southern Conference men's basketball tournament
February 28	vs. Chattanooga; First Round	L 66–69	10–18	Asheville Civic Center; Asheville, NC
*Non-conference game. (#) Tournament seedings in parentheses. All times are in Eastern Time.

== 1986–87 ==
1986–87 The Citadel Bulldogs men's basketball
- Conference: Southern Conference
- Record: 13–15 (6–10 SoCon)
- Head coach: Randy Nesbit
- Home arena: McAlister Field House

1986–87 Southern Conference men's basketball standings
	Conf.				Overall
Team	W		L	PCT	W		L	PCT
Marshall †	15	–	1	.938	25	–	6	.806
Chattanooga	14	–	2	.875	21	–	8	.724
Davidson	12	–	4	.750	20	–	10	.667
Furman	10	–	6	.625	17	–	12	.586
The Citadel	6	–	10	.375	13	–	15	.464
VMI	5	–	11	.313	11	–	17	.393
Western Carolina	4	–	12	.250	10	–	19	.345
Appalachian State	3	–	13	.188	7	–	21	.250
East Tennessee State	3	–	13	.188	7	–	21	.250
† 1987 Southern Conference tournament winner As of April 30, 1987; Rankings from AP poll

Date time, TV	Opponent	Result	Record	Site city, state
November 29*	at South Alabama	W 84–76	1–0	Jag Gym; Mobile, AL
December 1*	Coker	W 92–57	2–0	McAlister Field House; Charleston, SC
December 4*	at Army	W 69–65	3–0	Christl Arena; West Point, NY
December 5*	at Hartford	L 66–74	3–1	Hartford, CT
December 8*	UMBC	W 64–61	4–1	McAlister Field House; Charleston, SC
December 10*	at South Carolina	L 64–75	4–2	Carolina Coliseum; Columbia, SC
December 13*	Benedict	W 113–80	5–2	McAlister Field House; Charleston, SC
December 22*	at No. 13 Kansas	L 71–74	5–3	Allen Fieldhouse; Lawrence, KS
January 5	at Chattanooga	L 60–72	5–4 (0–1)	McKenzie Arena; Chattanooga, TN
January 10	Davidson	L 71–79	5–5 (0–2)	McAlister Field House; Charleston, SC
January 13*	at College of Charleston	L 81–96	5–6	John Kresse Arena; Charleston, SC
January 17	Marshall	L 69–72	5–7 (0–3)	McAlister Field House; Charleston, SC
January 19	VMI	W 82–78 ^{OT}	6–7 (1–3)	McAlister Field House; Charleston, SC
January 22	at Furman	L 77–93	6–8 (1–4)	Greenville Memorial Auditorium; Greenville, SC
January 24	at Davidson	L 68–86	6–9 (1–5)	Johnston Gym; Davidson, NC
January 26	East Tennessee State	W 90–80	7–9 (2–5)	McAlister Field House; Charleston, SC
January 31	Appalachian State	L 69–72	7–10 (2–6)	McAlister Field House; Charleston, SC
February 2	at Western Carolina	W 95–78	8–10 (3–6)	Cullowhee, NC
February 5*	UNC Asheville	W 71–65	9–10	McAlister Field House; Charleston, SC
February 7	at VMI	L 62–68	9–11 (3–7)	Cameron Hall; Lexington, VA
February 9	at Marshall	L 92–96	9–12 (3–8)	Cam Henderson Center; Huntington, WV
February 12*	Barber–Scotia	W 94–69	10–12	McAlister Field House; Charleston, SC
February 14	at East Tennessee State	W 86–72	11–12 (4–8)	Memorial Center; Johnson City, TN
February 16	at Appalachian State	W 70–66	12–12 (5–8)	Varsity Gymnasium; Boone, NC
February 19	at Furman	L 69–80 ^{OT}	12–13 (5–9)	Greenville Memorial Auditorium; Greenville, SC
February 21	Western Carolina	L 70–75	12–14 (5–10)	McAlister Field House; Charleston, SC
February 23	Chattanooga	W 86–71	13–14 (6–10)	McAlister Field House; Charleston, SC
1987 Southern Conference men's basketball tournament
February 27	vs. Furman; First Round	L 78–85	13–15	Asheville Civic Center; Asheville, NC
*Non-conference game. (#) Tournament seedings in parentheses. All times are in Eastern Time.

== 1987–88 ==
1987–88 The Citadel Bulldogs men's basketball
- Conference: Southern Conference
- Record: 8–20 (5–11 SoCon)
- Head coach: Randy Nesbit
- Home arena: John Kresse Arena & North Charleston High School

1987–88 Southern Conference men's basketball standings
	Conf.				Overall
Team	W		L	PCT	W		L	PCT
Marshall	14	–	2	.875	24	–	8	.750
Furman	11	–	5	.688	18	–	10	.643
Davidson	9	–	7	.563	15	–	13	.536
East Tennessee State	9	–	7	.563	14	–	15	.483
Chattanooga †	8	–	8	.500	20	–	13	.606
Appalachian State	8	–	8	.500	16	–	13	.552
VMI	6	–	10	.375	13	–	17	.433
The Citadel	5	–	11	.313	8	–	20	.286
Western Carolina	2	–	14	.125	8	–	19	.296
† 1988 SoCon Tournament winner Rankings from AP poll

With McAlister Field House undergoing renovation, the Bulldogs played home games at College of Charleston's home arena, John Kresse Arena and North Charleston High School.

Date time, TV	Opponent	Result	Record	Site city, state
November 27*	vs. Rhode Island; Investors' Classic	L 85–113	0–1	University Hall; Charlottesville, VA
November 28*	vs. Columbia; Investors' Classic	W 70–56	1–1	University Hall; Charlottesville, VA
December 2*	at UNC Asheville	L 72–85	1–2	Justice Center; Asheville, NC
December 5*	Army	L 64–69	1–3	John Kresse Arena; Charleston, SC
December 12*	Eckerd	W 80–65	2–3	John Kresse Arena; Charleston, SC
December 17*	at No. 4 North Carolina	L 74–98	2–4	Dean Smith Center; Chapel Hill, NC
January 4*	at Navy	L 67–79	2–5	Halsey Field House; Annapolis, MD
January 7	at Furman	L 84–91	2–6 (0–1)	Greenville Memorial Auditorium; Greenville, SC
January 9	Davidson	L 80–85	2–7 (0–2)	John Kresse Arena; Charleston, SC
January 13	at College of Charleston	L 58–84	2–8 (0–3)	John Kresse Arena; Charleston, SC
January 16*	Newberry	W 78–66	3–8	John Kresse Arena; Charleston, SC
January 18*	Coker	L 51–54	3–9	John Kresse Arena; Charleston, SC
January 21	Chattanooga	L 63–77	3–10 (0–3)	North Charleston High School; North Charleston, SC
January 23	at Marshall	L 67–87	3–11 (0–4)	Cam Henderson Center; Huntington, WV
January 25	at VMI	L 63–77	3–12 (0–5)	Cameron Hall; Lexington, VA
January 30	at Davidson	L 67–79	3–13 (0–6)	Johnston Gym; Davidson, NC
February 1	at East Tennessee State	L 90–97	3–14 (0–7)	Memorial Center; Johnson City, TN
February 6	at Appalachian State	L 72–89	3–15 (0–8)	Varsity Gymnasium; Boone, NC
February 8	Western Carolina	W 67–64	4–15 (1–8)	John Kresse Arena; Charleston, SC
February 10	Furman	L 68–81	4–16 (1–9)	John Kresse Arena; Charleston, SC
February 13	VMI	W 64–59	5–16 (2–9)	John Kresse Arena; Charleston, SC
February 15	at Marshall	L 78–105	5–17 (2–10)	Cam Henderson Center; Huntington, WV
February 20	at Western Carolina	L 67–73	5–18 (2–11)	Ramsey Center; Cullowhee, NC
February 22	at Chattanooga	W 69–68 ^{OT}	6–18 (3–11)	McKenzie Arena; Chattanooga, TN
February 24*	at South Carolina	L 66–88	6–19	Carolina Coliseum; Columbia, SC
February 27	East Tennessee State	W 85–66	7–19 (4–11)	North Charleston High School; North Charleston, SC
February 29	Appalachian State	W 73–71	8–19 (5–11)	John Kresse Arena; Charleston, SC
1988 Southern Conference men's basketball tournament
March 4	vs. Marshall	L 78–121	8–20	Asheville Civic Center; Asheville, NC
*Non-conference game. (#) Tournament seedings in parentheses. All times are in Eastern Time.

== 1988–89 ==
1988–89 The Citadel Bulldogs men's basketball
- Conference: Southern Conference
- Record: 16–12 (7–7 SoCon)
- Head coach: Randy Nesbit
- Home arena: Deas Hall

1988–89 Southern Conference men's basketball standings
	Conf.				Overall
Team	W		L	PCT	W		L	PCT
Chattanooga	10	–	4	.714	18	–	12	.600
Furman	9	–	5	.643	17	–	12	.586
Appalachian State	8	–	6	.571	20	–	8	.714
East Tennessee State †	7	–	7	.500	20	–	11	.645
The Citadel	7	–	7	.500	16	–	12	.571
Marshall	6	–	8	.429	15	–	15	.500
VMI	5	–	9	.357	11	–	17	.393
Western Carolina	4	–	10	.286	12	–	16	.429
† 1989 SoCon Tournament winner As of April 30, 1988; Rankings from AP poll

Due to the continuing renovations of McAlister Field House, the Bulldogs played home games at the on-campus Deas Hall. This facility is traditionally used for cadet recreation and fitness.

Date time, TV	Opponent	Result	Record	Site city, state
November 26*	at No. 1 Duke	L 52–93	0–1	Cameron Indoor Stadium; Durham, NC
November 28*	at Clemson	L 82–96	0–2	Littlejohn Coliseum; Clemson, SC
December 1*	UNC Asheville	W 93–77	1–2	Deas Hall; Charleston, SC
December 4*	Savannah State	W 100–73	2–2	Deas Hall; Charleston, SC
December 8	Allen	W 71–45	3–2	Deas Hall; Charleston, SC
December 19*	at San Francisco; Met Life Classic	L 80–94	3–3	War Memorial Gymnasium; San Francisco, CA
December 20	vs. Indiana State; Met Life Classic	W 112–75	4–3	War Memorial Gymnasium; San Francisco, CA
January 7	at Furman	W 80–76	5–3 (1–0)	Greenville Memorial Auditorium; Greenville, SC
January 9*	Navy	W 71–62	6–3	Deas Hall; Charleston, SC
January 12*	at College of Charleston	W 65–58	7–3	John Kresse Arena; Charleston, SC
January 14	Appalachian State	W 65–62	8–3 (2–0)	Deas Hall; Charleston, SC
January 21	at Marshall	L 53–62	8–4 (2–1)	Cam Henderson Center; Huntington, WV
January 23	at VMI	W 73–61	9–4 (3–1)	Cameron Hall; Lexington, VA
January 25	East Tennessee State	L 70–79	9–5 (3–2)	Deas Hall; Charleston, SC
January 28	Chattanooga	L 67–71	9–6 (3–3)	Deas Hall; Charleston, SC
January 30	Western Carolina	W 79–51	10–6 (4–3)	Deas Hall; Charleston, SC
February 2*	at South Carolina State	L 70–84	10–7	SHM Memorial Center; Orangeburg, SC
February 4	Furman	L 60–61	10–8 (4–4)	Deas Hall; Charleston, SC
February 6*	at Liberty	W 81–74	11–8	Lynchburg, VA
February 8	Piedmont	W 105–48	12–8	Deas Hall; Charleston, SC
February 11	at East Tennessee State	W 78–75	13–8 (5–4)	Memorial Center; Johnson City, TN
February 13	at Appalachian State	L 72–86	13–9 (5–5)	Varsity Gymnasium; Boone, NC
February 18	VMI	W 88–79	14–9 (6–5)	Deas Hall; Charleston, SC
February 20	Marshall	W 100–80	15–9 (7–5)	Deas Hall; Charleston, SC
February 22*	at South Carolina	W 88–87	16–9	Carolina Coliseum; Columbia, SC
February 25	at Western Carolina	L 61–64	16–10 (7–6)	Cullowhee, NC
February 27	at Chattanooga	L 70–79	16–11 (7–7)	McKenzie Arena; Chattanooga, TN
1989 Southern Conference men's basketball tournament
March 3	vs. East Tennessee State; First round	L 89–93	16–12	Asheville Civic Center; Asheville, NC
*Non-conference game. (#) Tournament seedings in parentheses. All times are in Eastern Time.
