= Rodney McKeever =

American college basketball player

Personal information
- Listed height: 6 ft 0 in (1.83 m)
- Listed weight: 145 lb (66 kg)

Career information
- High school: Garrett (Charleston, South Carolina)
- College: The Citadel (1973–1976); West Alabama (1977–1978)
- NBA draft: 1978: undrafted
- Position: Point guard

Career highlights
- SoCon Player of the Year (1976); 2× First-team All-SoCon (1975, 1976); Second-team All-SoCon (1974); First-team All-GSC (1978)

Rodney C. McKeever is an American former college basketball player at The Citadel. He was named the Southern Conference Player of the Year in 1976, the first of two Bulldogs to claim the award since its establishment in 1952. McKeever is a Charleston, South Carolina native and graduate of Garrett High School, where he was known as an excellent shooter and ball handler.

== College career ==
McKeever led the Bulldogs in scoring all three years of his career, joining the starting lineup in just the second game of his first season. He amassed 1,358 points in his career, good for third place at the time he departed the program, and seventh as of 2012.

McKeever resigned from The Citadel late in his junior year. Citadel President Lt. Gen. George M. Seignious stressed that his departure had nothing to do with basketball, the coach, or the team. McKeever had told a professor he had to miss class because he was going to the hospital, which was a lie, and due to the strict standards of the honor code at a military school he was forced to resign.
