= Gary Daniels (basketball) =

American basketball player (1940–2017)

Personal information
- Born: December 6, 1940 Canton, Ohio, U.S.
- Died: July 31, 2017 (aged 76) Raeford, North Carolina, U.S.

Career information
- College: The Citadel (1959–1962)
- NBA draft: 1962: undrafted
- Stats at Basketball Reference

Gary Daniels (1940–2017) was a basketball player, who was an honorable mention All-American in 1962 at The Citadel. He was the first ever player from The Citadel to be selected in the NBA Draft, drafted in the fifth round of the 1962 NBA draft by the Boston Celtics, although he did not appear in an NBA game.

Born in 1940 in Canton, Ohio, he played high school basketball at Lincoln High School and at The Citadel. He was the first Bulldogs player to be named All-Conference, earning the honor in both 1961 and 1962 as a member of "Blitz Kids" teams. He graduated with the school's record in average career scoring (19.7 ppg), and served in the Army after graduation, reaching the rank of Major. He died in 2017 in Raeford, North Carolina.
