= Chesapeake Energy Capital Classic =

American college basketball rivalry

Marshall Thundering Herd–West Virginia Mountaineers
Men's Basketball History
| First meeting | January 16, 1929 |
| Last Meeting | March 18, 2018 |
| Last Result | WVU: 94–71 |
| Next Meeting | TBD |
| Number of Meetings | 45 |
| All-Time Series | WVU: 34–11 |
| Largest victory | WVU: 44–21 (1/16/1929); 94–71 (3/18/2018) |
| Current Streak | WVU: Won 6 |
| Longest MU Win Streak | 2 (12/06/1980-12/05/1981) (1/11/2005-1/25/2006) |
| Longest WVU Win Streak | 8 (1/16/1929-1/02/1980) |
| Last ten games | WVU: 9–1 |
Women's Basketball History
| First meeting | January 25, 1974 |
| Last Meeting | December 13, 2015 |
| Last Result | WVU: 66–60 |
| Next Meeting | TBD |
| Number of Meetings | 55 |
| All-Time Series | WVU: 39–16 |
| Largest victory | WVU: 78–21 (1/19/2011) |
| Current Streak | WVU: Won 11 |
| Longest MU Win Streak | 5 (1/25/1974-2/21/1976) |
| Longest WVU Win Streak | 11 (1/25/2006–present) |
| Last ten games | WVU: 10–0 |

Locations of Marshall and West Virginia

The Chesapeake Energy Capital Classic (also known as the Charleston Capital Classic and formerly as the Toyota Capital Classic) is the name of the in-state rivalry between the Marshall University and West Virginia University basketball teams, the Marshall Thundering Herd and West Virginia Mountaineers. Chesapeake Energy is the title sponsor of the game. The game was last played during the 2015–2016 season and no further games are currently scheduled.

== History ==
The basketball series was first played in 1929 (1974 for the women), but they didn't start playing annually until 1978. In 1992, they started to play their annual game in West Virginia's capital city of Charleston. WVU's campus is in Morgantown, West Virginia and Marshall's campus is in Huntington, West Virginia. The two universities are the only Division I programs in the state, thus creating a natural geographic rivalry. The meeting typically occurred in the middle of the schools conference schedules when WVU was in the Big East Conference. Since West Virginia joined the Big 12 Conference in 2012 the game has occurred in December. Marshall has been a member of Conference USA since 2005.

== Men's basketball ==
The first seven meetings of the teams were in Morgantown, leading to the 1980 matchup at the Charleston Civic Center. From there, the game alternated between Huntington at the Cam Henderson Center and in Morgantown at the WVU Coliseum, with one exception, when it was played in Charleston in 1989.

The series moved to Charleston permanently in 1992 to coincide with the regular session of the West Virginia Legislature.

West Virginia leads the all-time series 34–11. When the game was played in Charleston, the Mountaineers have dominated the series by a 22–5 record. The Mountaineers also dominated the series in Morgantown with a record of 11–1, while the Thundering Herd was undefeated at 5–0 in games played in Huntington. The one neutral site game played in San Diego was won by the Mountaineers.

One of the most memorable games between in the series came in 2006, when Marshall ended the Mountaineers' 12-game winning streak. West Virginia was ranked No. 13 ESPN/USA Today and No. 9 AP poll, WVU center Kevin Pittsnogle guaranteed a victory for the Mountaineers, WVU held the nation's longest win streak, while Marshall was 7–9 prior to the match-up. Marshall shocked the college basketball world with a 58–52 upset win, it was the Thundering Herd's first win over an Associated Press Top 10 opponent since beating St. John's in 1971. Since that game, West Virginia has won nine of the last ten games over the Herd.

Amid rumors of the series end in 2014, first-year Marshall head coach Dan D'Antoni said, "If they back out now they’re afraid of us." WVU head coach Bob Huggins responded by calling his comments "laughable" and went on to question the legitimacy of the rivalry. In early 2016 it was announced that the game would not be played during the 2016–2017 college basketball season. The future of the series is uncertain.

The rivalry was unexpectedly renewed during the 2018 NCAA tournament when 13th-seeded Marshall faced 5th-seeded West Virginia in the second round. West Virginia went on to defeat Marshall, 94–71, and advance to the Sweet 16. It was the first time the two teams met outside of West Virginia.

=== Results ===
| Date | Winning Team | | Losing Team | | Site | Series |
|---|---|---|---|---|---|---|
| Jan. 16, 1929 | West Virginia | 44 | Marshall | 21 | Morgantown, WV | WV 1–0 |
| Feb. 2, 1930 | West Virginia | 48 | Marshall | 35 | Morgantown, WV | WV 2–0 |
| Jan. 14, 1931 | West Virginia | 36 | Marshall | 22 | Morgantown, WV | WV 3–0 |
| Feb. 20, 1978 | West Virginia | 80 | Marshall | 73 | Morgantown, WV | WV 4–0 |
| Dec. 8, 1978 | West Virginia | 79 | Marshall | 73 | Morgantown, WV | WV 5–0 |
| Dec. 30, 1978 | West Virginia | 73 | Marshall | 71 | Morgantown, WV | WV 6–0 |
| Dec. 29, 1979 | West Virginia | 71 | Marshall | 61 | Morgantown, WV | WV 7–0 |
| Jan. 2, 1980 | West Virginia | 63 | Marshall | 62 | Charleston, WV | WV 8–0 |
| Dec. 6, 1980 | Marshall | 76 | West Virginia | 73 | Morgantown, WV | WV 8–1 |
| Dec. 5, 1981 | Marshall | 91 | West Virginia | 78 | Huntington, WV | WV 8–2 |
| Dec. 4, 1982 | West Virginia | 95 | Marshall | 82 | Morgantown, WV | WV 9–2 |
| Dec. 3, 1983 | Marshall | 78 | West Virginia | 67 | Huntington, WV | WV 9–3 |
| Dec. 8, 1984 | West Virginia | 89 | Marshall | 77 | Morgantown, WV | WV 10–3 |
| Dec. 7, 1985 | Marshall | 64 | West Virginia | 60 | Huntington, WV | WV 10–4 |
| Dec. 27, 1986 | West Virginia | 69 | Marshall | 67 | Morgantown, WV | WV 11–4 |
| Dec. 27, 1987 | Marshall | 82 | West Virginia | 72 | Huntington, WV | WV 11–5 |
| Feb. 9, 1989 | #15 West Virginia | 81 | Marshall | 73 | Charleston, WV | WV 12–5 |
| Dec. 5, 1989 | West Virginia | 74 | Marshall | 56 | Morgantown, WV | WV 13–5 |
| Dec. 4, 1990 | Marshall | 97 | West Virginia | 80 | Huntington, WV | WV 13–6 |
| Jan. 22, 1992 | West Virginia | 90 | Marshall | 76 | Charleston, WV | WV 14–6 |
| Feb. 17, 1993 | West Virginia | 72 | Marshall | 65 | Charleston, WV | WV 15–6 |
| Jan. 19, 1994 | #24 West Virginia | 79 | Marshall | 67 | Charleston, WV | WV 16–6 |
| Jan. 19, 1995 | West Virginia | 89 | Marshall | 82 | Charleston, WV | WV 17–6 |
| Jan. 18, 1996 | Marshall | 91 | West Virginia | 87 | Charleston, WV | WV 17–7 |
| Dec. 17, 1996 | West Virginia | 103 | Marshall | 91 | Charleston, WV | WV 18–7 |
| Feb. 16, 1998 | #16 West Virginia | 71 | Marshall | 58 | Charleston, WV | WV 19–7 |
| Jan. 27, 1999 | West Virginia | 85 | Marshall | 84 | Charleston, WV | WV 20–7 |
| Jan. 18, 2000 | West Virginia | 82 | Marshall | 77 | Charleston, WV | WV 21–7 |
| Jan. 9, 2001 | West Virginia | 73 | Marshall | 67 | Charleston, WV | WV 22–7 |
| Jan. 23, 2002 | Marshall | 81 | West Virginia | 79 | Charleston, WV | WV 22–8 |
| Jan. 22, 2003 | West Virginia | 65 | Marshall | 61 | Charleston, WV | WV 23–8 |
| Jan. 21, 2004 | West Virginia | 55 | Marshall | 51 | Charleston, WV | WV 24–8 |
| Jan. 11, 2005 | Marshall | 59 | West Virginia | 55 | Charleston, WV | WV 24–9 |
| Jan. 25, 2006 | Marshall | 58 | #9 West Virginia | 52 | Charleston, WV | WV 24–10 |
| Jan. 24, 2007 | West Virginia | 77 | Marshall | 63 | Charleston, WV | WV 25–10 |
| Jan. 23, 2008 | West Virginia | 66 | Marshall | 64 | Charleston, WV | WV 26–10 |
| Jan. 14, 2009 | West Virginia | 87 | Marshall | 76 | Charleston, WV | WV 27–10 |
| Jan. 20, 2010 | #11 West Virginia | 68 | Marshall | 60 | Charleston, WV | WV 28–10 |
| Jan. 19, 2011 | Marshall | 75 | #21 West Virginia | 71 | Charleston, WV | WV 28–11 |
| Jan. 18, 2012 | West Virginia | 78 | Marshall | 62 | Charleston, WV | WV 29–11 |
| Dec. 5, 2012 | West Virginia | 69 | Marshall | 59 | Charleston, WV | WV 30–11 |
| Dec. 14, 2013 | West Virginia | 74 | Marshall | 64 | Charleston, WV | WV 31–11 |
| Dec. 14, 2014 | #21 West Virginia | 69 | Marshall | 66 | Charleston, WV | WV 32–11 |
| Dec. 17, 2015 | #20 West Virginia | 86 | Marshall | 68 | Charleston, WV | WV 33–11 |
| Mar. 18, 2018 | #15 West Virginia | 94 | Marshall | 71 | San Diego, CA | WV 34–11 |

== Women's basketball ==
Marshall and WVU have a shorter history, but a similar one as the men. Marshall and WVU first played in 1974 and they would play 2 or 3 times a year alternating locations until 1992. (when it was moved to Charleston.) They played on the same day as the men until 2012 when they started playing the day before.

WVU owns the series at all the locations. West Virginia is 9–4 at home, 8–4 in Huntington, and 22–8 in neutral sites. WVU is 39–16 all-time.

=== Results ===
| Date | Winning Team | | Losing Team | | Site | Series |
|---|---|---|---|---|---|---|
| Jan. 25, 1974 | Marshall | 44 | West Virginia | 32 | Morgantown, WV | MU 1–0 |
| Jan. 22, 1975 | Marshall | 61 | West Virginia | 53 | Huntington, WV | MU 2–0 |
| Feb. 21, 1975 | Marshall | 75 | West Virginia | 52 | Morgantown, WV | MU 3–0 |
| Jan. 21, 1976 | Marshall | 50 | West Virginia | 48 | Morgantown, WV | MU 4–0 |
| Feb. 21, 1976 | Marshall | 69 | West Virginia | 68 | Buckhannon, WV | MU 5–0 |
| Jan. 17, 1977 | West Virginia | 53 | Marshall | 43 | Huntington, WV | MU 5–1 |
| Mar. 4, 1977 | West Virginia | 79 | Marshall | 70 | Buckhannon, WV | MU 5–2 |
| Jan. 18, 1978 | West Virginia | 51 | Marshall | 50 | Huntington, WV | MU 5–3 |
| Feb. 20, 1978 | West Virginia | 73 | Marshall | 62 | Morgantown, WV | MU 5–4 |
| Feb. 28, 1978 | Marshall | 74 | West Virginia | 65 | Morgantown, WV | MU 6–4 |
| Mar. 1, 1978 | West Virginia | 68 | Marshall | 56 | Morgantown, WV | MU 6–5 |
| Jan. 10, 1979 | West Virginia | 85 | Marshall | 82 | Morgantown, WV | Tied 6–6 |
| Jan. 31, 1979 | West Virginia | 66 | Marshall | 54 | Huntington, WV | WV 7–6 |
| Jan. 2, 1980 | Marshall | 76 | West Virginia | 75 | Charleston, WV | Tied 7–7 |
| Jan. 24, 1980 | Marshall | 84 | West Virginia | 72 | Huntington, WV | MU 8–7 |
| Dec. 15, 1980 | West Virginia | 95 | Marshall | 65 | Huntington, WV | Tied 8–8 |
| Feb. 25, 1981 | West Virginia | 88 | Marshall | 64 | Morgantown, WV | WV 9–8 |
| Dec. 5, 1981 | West Virginia | 70 | Marshall | 61 | Huntington, WV | WV 10–8 |
| Feb. 20, 1982 | West Virginia | 80 | Marshall | 57 | Morgantown, WV | WV 11–8 |
| Dec. 4, 1982 | West Virginia | 87 | Marshall | 58 | Morgantown, WV | WV 12–8 |
| Jan. 13, 1983 | West Virginia | 64 | Marshall | 49 | Huntington, WV | WV 13–8 |
| Dec. 3, 1983 | West Virginia | 76 | Marshall | 65 | Huntington, WV | WV 14–8 |
| Dec. 3, 1984 | West Virginia | 78 | Marshall | 71 | Morgantown, WV | WV 15–8 |
| Dec. 22, 1984 | West Virginia | 92 | Marshall | 79 | Elkins, WV | WV 16–8 |
| Dec. 10, 1985 | Marshall | 90 | West Virginia | 72 | Huntington, WV | WV 16–9 |
| Dec. 6, 1986 | West Virginia | 85 | Marshall | 82 | Morgantown, WV | WV 17–9 |
| Nov. 30, 1987 | West Virginia | 72 | Marshall | 67 | Huntington, WV | WV 18–9 |
| Feb. 9, 1989 | West Virginia | 77 | Marshall | 42 | Charleston, WV | WV 19–9 |
| Jan. 6, 1990 | West Virginia | 81 | Marshall | 39 | Morgantown, WV | WV 20–9 |
| Dec. 5, 1990 | Marshall | 70 | West Virginia | 63 | Huntington, WV | WV 20–10 |
| Jan. 22, 1992 | West Virginia | 89 | Marshall | 73 | Charleston, WV | WV 21–10 |
| Feb. 17, 1993 | Marshall | 92 | West Virginia | 81 | Charleston, WV | WV 21–11 |
| Jan. 19, 1994 | West Virginia | 73 | Marshall | 66 | Charleston, WV | WV 22–11 |
| Jan. 19, 1995 | Marshall | 87 | West Virginia | 72 | Charleston, WV | WV 22–12 |
| Jan. 18, 1996 | West Virginia | 76 | Marshall | 71 | Charleston, WV | WV 23–12 |
| Dec. 17, 1996 | West Virginia | 86 | Marshall | 78 | Charleston, WV | WV 24–12 |
| Feb. 16, 1998 | Marshall | 68 | West Virginia | 63 | Charleston, WV | WV 24–13 |
| Jan. 27, 1999 | West Virginia | 76 | Marshall | 60 | Charleston, WV | WV 25–13 |
| Jan. 18, 2000 | Marshall | 62 | West Virginia | 51 | Charleston, WV | WV 25–14 |
| Jan. 9, 2001 | Marshall | 74 | West Virginia | 72 | Charleston, WV | WV 25–15 |
| Jan. 23, 2002 | West Virginia | 65 | Marshall | 37 | Charleston, WV | WV 26–15 |
| Jan. 22, 2003 | West Virginia | 67 | Marshall | 63 | Charleston, WV | WV 27–15 |
| Jan. 21, 2004 | West Virginia | 79 | Marshall | 53 | Charleston, WV | WV 28–15 |
| Jan. 11, 2005 | Marshall | 82 | West Virginia | 76 | Charleston, WV | WV 28–16 |
| Jan. 25, 2006 | West Virginia | 72 | Marshall | 58 | Charleston, WV | WV 29–16 |
| Jan. 24, 2007 | West Virginia | 76 | Marshall | 54 | Charleston, WV | WV 30–16 |
| Jan. 23, 2008 | #12 West Virginia | 58 | Marshall | 51 | Charleston, WV | WV 31–16 |
| Jan. 14, 2009 | West Virginia | 74 | Marshall | 65 | Charleston, WV | WV 32–16 |
| Jan. 20, 2010 | #16 West Virginia | 74 | Marshall | 42 | Charleston, WV | WV 33–16 |
| Jan. 19, 2011 | #9 West Virginia | 78 | Marshall | 21 | Charleston, WV | WV 34–16 |
| Jan. 17, 2012 | West Virginia | 69 | Marshall | 57 | Charleston, WV | WV 35–16 |
| Dec. 4, 2012 | West Virginia | 64 | Marshall | 48 | Charleston, WV | WV 36–16 |
| Dec. 14, 2013 | West Virginia | 82 | Marshall | 51 | Charleston, WV | WV 37–16 |
| Dec. 20, 2014 | #22 West Virginia | 69 | Marshall | 56 | Charleston, WV | WV 38–16 |
| Dec. 13, 2015 | West Virginia | 66 | Marshall | 60 | Charleston, WV | WV 39–16 |

== See also ==
- Friends of Coal Bowl – football rivalry between Marshall and West Virginia
- Mountain State derby – soccer rivalry between Marshall and West Virginia
