= 2017–18 UNC Wilmington Seahawks men's basketball team =

American college basketball season

2017–18 UNC Wilmington Seahawks men's basketball
- Conference: Colonial Athletic Association
- Record: 11–21 (7–11 CAA)
- Head coach: C. B. McGrath (1st season)
- Assistant coaches: Doug Esleeck; Jackie Manuel; Joe Wolf
- Home arena: Trask Coliseum

2017–18 CAA men's basketball standings
	Conf.				Overall
Team	W		L	PCT	W		L	PCT
College of Charleston †	14	–	4	.778	26	–	8	.765
Northeastern	14	–	4	.778	23	–	10	.697
Hofstra	12	–	6	.667	19	–	12	.613
William & Mary	11	–	7	.611	19	–	12	.613
Towson	8	–	10	.444	18	–	14	.563
UNC Wilmington	7	–	11	.389	11	–	21	.344
Delaware	6	–	12	.333	14	–	19	.424
Drexel	6	–	12	.333	13	–	20	.394
James Madison	6	–	12	.333	10	–	22	.313
Elon	6	–	12	.333	14	–	18	.438
† 2018 CAA tournament winner

The 2017–18 UNC Wilmington Seahawks men's basketball team represented the University of North Carolina at Wilmington during the 2017–18 NCAA Division I men's basketball season. The Seahawks were led by first-year head coach C. B. McGrath and played their home games at the Trask Coliseum as members of the Colonial Athletic Association. They finished the season 11–21, 7–11 in CAA play to finish in sixth place. They defeated Hofstra in the quarterfinals of the CAA tournament before losing in the semifinals to Northeastern.

== Previous season ==
The Seahawks finished the 2016–17 season 29–6, 15–3 in CAA play to win the regular season championship. They defeated Delaware, William & Mary, and the College of Charleston to win the CAA tournament. As a result, they earned the conference's automatic bid to the NCAA tournament for the second consecutive year. As the No. 12 seed in the East region, they lost in the first round to Virginia.

On March 17, 2017, head coach Kevin Keatts left the school to accept the head coaching position at NC State. On April 3, the school hired C.B. McGrath as head coach.

== Offseason ==
=== Departures ===
Name	Number	Pos.	Height	Weight	Year	Hometown	Reason for departure
Ambrose Mosley	00	G	6'2"	185	RS Senior	Jacksonville, FL	Graduated
Chris Flemmings	1	G	6'5"	180	RS Senior	Cary, NC	Graduated
Denzel Ingram	10	G	6'0"	175	RS Senior	Chapel Hill, NC	Graduated
C. J. Bryce	12	G	6'5"	185	Sophomore	Huntersville, NC	Transferred to NC State
Chuck Ogbodo	13	F	6'9"	225	Senior	Enugu, Nigeria	Graduated

=== Incoming transfers ===
Name	Number	Pos.	Height	Weight	Year	Hometown	Previous School
Jeantal Cylla		G	6'6"	210	Junior	Fort Worth, TX	Florida Atlantic

- Under NCAA transfer rules, Cylla sat out for the 2017–18 season, and had two years of remaining eligibility.

=== Recruiting class of 2017 ===
College recruiting information
Name	Hometown	School	Height	Weight	Commit date
Jay Estime #49 SF	Lilburn, GA	Berkmar High School	6 ft 5 in (1.96 m)	190 lb (86 kg)	
Jay Estime #49 SF	Recruit ratings: Scout: Rivals: (NR)				
Jeffrey Gary; PG	Colorado Springs, CO	Sand Creek High School	6 ft 4 in (1.93 m)	170 lb (77 kg)	
Jeffrey Gary; PG	Recruit ratings: Scout: Rivals: (NR)				
Overall recruit ranking:
Note: In many cases, Scout, Rivals, 247Sports, On3, and ESPN may conflict in their listings of height and weight.; In these cases, the average was taken. ESPN grades are on a 100-point scale.; Sources: "2017 Team Ranking". Rivals.

== Preseason ==
In a poll of league coaches, media relations directors, and media members at the CAA's media day, the Seahawks were picked to finish in fifth place in the CAA. Junior forward Devontae Cacok was named to the preseason All-CAA first team.

== Roster ==
2017–18 UNC Wilmington Seahawks men's basketball team
Players
Coaches

Pos.	#	Name	Height	Weight	Year	Previous school	Hometown
G	1	Jaylen Fornes	6 ft 3 in (1.91 m)	205 lb (93 kg)	So	Word of God Christian Academy	Grantsboro, North Carolina
G	3	JaQuel Richmond	6 ft 2 in (1.88 m)	175 lb (79 kg)	RS Jr	Wesleyan Christian Academy/Middle Tennessee	Greensboro, North Carolina
G	4	Jordan Talley	6 ft 1 in (1.85 m)	180 lb (82 kg)	Sr	Henrico HS	Richmond, Virginia
G	5	Jeffrey Gary	6 ft 4 in (1.93 m)	162 lb (73 kg)	Fr	Sand Creek HS	Colorado Springs, Colorado
G	12	Jay Estime	6 ft 5 in (1.96 m)	192 lb (87 kg)	Fr	Berkmar HS	Lilburn, Georgia
G	13	Jacque Brown (W)	5 ft 10 in (1.78 m)	160 lb (73 kg)	Jr	East Carteret HS/Cape Fear CC	Beaufort, North Carolina
G	14	Nick Powell (W)	6 ft 6 in (1.98 m)	200 lb (91 kg)	Sr	Northwest Guilford HS	Greensboro, North Carolina
F	15	Devontae Cacok	6 ft 7 in (2.01 m)	240 lb (109 kg)	Jr	Alpharetta HS	Riverdale, Georgia
F	20	Matt Elmore	6 ft 9 in (2.06 m)	250 lb (113 kg)	So	Dixon HS	Jacksonville, North Carolina
G	21	Tyrone Taylor	6 ft 1 in (1.85 m)	160 lb (73 kg)	RS So	Hargrave Military Academy/Wichita State	Grandview, Missouri
G	22	Daniel Etoroma	6 ft 6 in (1.98 m)	220 lb (100 kg)	Jr	Mt. Zion	Raleigh, North Carolina
F	30	Marcus Bryan	6 ft 7 in (2.01 m)	242 lb (110 kg)	RS Sr	Ravenscroft HS/Charlotte	Raleigh, North Carolina
C	33	Trey Kalina	7 ft 0 in (2.13 m)	264 lb (120 kg)	Jr	North Cobb Christian/Coffeyville CC	Gadsden, Alabama
G		Jeantal Cylla (redshirt)	6 ft 7 in (2.01 m)	205 lb (93 kg)	Jr	Lake Worth HS/Florida Atlantic	Lake Worth, Florida

Head coach

- C. B. McGrath (Kansas)

Assistant coach(es)

- Doug Esleek (North Carolina)
- Jackie Manuel (North Carolina)
- Joe Wolf (North Carolina)
- Chase Pruitt (Saddleback College)

Legend

- (C) Team captain
- (S) Suspended
- (I) Ineligible
- (W) Walk-on
- Injured
- Current redshirt

Roster

== Schedule and results ==
Date time, TV	Rank^{#}	Opponent^{#}	Result	Record	High points	High rebounds	High assists	Site (attendance) city, state
Non-conference regular season
Nov 11, 2017*; 7:00 pm		North Carolina Wesleyan; Savannah Invitational	W 105–81	1–0	24 – Talley	16 – Cacok	5 – Talley	Trask Coliseum (4,663); Wilmington, NC
Nov 14, 2017*; 7:00 pm		at Davidson	L 81–108	1–1	22 – Cacok	17 – Cacok	12 – Talley	John M. Belk Arena (3,252); Davidson, NC
Nov 18, 2017*; 7:00 pm		Campbell	W 88–84	2–1	18 – Tied	17 – Cacok	14 – Talley	Trask Coliseum (4,415); Wilmington, NC
Nov 24, 2017*; 5:00 pm		vs. Loyola–Chicago; Savannah Invitational	L 78–102	2–2	20 – Talley	9 – Bryan	4 – Tied	Savannah Civic Center (485); Savannah, GA
Nov 25, 2017*; 7:30 pm		vs. Valparaiso; Savannah Invitational	L 70–79	2–3	13 – Tied	10 – Tied	5 – Talley	Savannah Civic Center (547); Savannah, GA
Nov 30, 2017*; 8:00 pm, ESPN3		at East Carolina	L 88–93 ^{OT}	2–4	35 – Cacok	12 – Cacok	6 – Tied	Williams Arena (3,373); Greenville, NC
Dec 10, 2017*; 5:00 pm		at LSU	L 84–97	2–5	22 – Talley	5 – Bryan	7 – Talley	Maravich Center (7,812); Baton Rouge, LA
Dec 13, 2017*; 7:00 pm		at UNC Greensboro	L 58–71	2–6	22 – Cacok	17 – Cacok	3 – Talley	Greensboro Coliseum Complex (2,307); Greensboro, NC
Dec 17, 2017*; 2:00 pm		Furman	L 84–90	2–7	24 – Cacok	13 – Cacok	3 – Tied	Trask Coliseum (4,236); Wilmington, NC
Dec 21, 2017*; 7:00 pm		vs. North Dakota State; Don Haskins Sun Bowl Invitational semifinals	L 63–100	2–8	15 – Fornes	8 – Cacok	2 – Tied	Don Haskins Center (6,013); El Paso, TX
Dec 22, 2017*; 7:00 pm		vs. Howard; Don Haskins Sun Bowl Invitational	L 75–80	2–9	19 – Cacok	17 – Cacok	6 – Talley	Don Haskins Center (6,913); El Paso, TX
Dec 28, 2017*; 7:00 pm		Greensboro College	W 101–60	3–9	19 – Cacok	15 – Cacok	6 – Fornes	Trask Coliseum (3,865); Wilmington, NC
CAA regular season
Dec 30, 2017; 7:00 pm		Delaware	L 56–58	3–10 (0–1)	15 – Talley	19 – Cacok	4 – Talley	Trask Coliseum (3,931); Wilmington, NC
Jan 2, 2018; 7:00 pm		Drexel	W 107–87	4–10 (1–1)	24 – Talley	16 – Cacok	6 – Talley	Trask Coliseum (3,367); Wilmington, NC
Jan 5, 2018; 7:00 pm		at Towson	L 71–89	4–11 (1–2)	15 – Tied	10 – Cacok	5 – Talley	SECU Arena (1,251); Towson, MD
Jan 7, 2018; 2:00 pm		at Delaware	L 76–96	4–12 (1–3)	18 – Cacok	11 – Cacok	5 – Talley	Bob Carpenter Center (2,388); Newark, DE
Jan 11, 2018; 7:00 pm		at Elon	W 80–78 ^{OT}	5–12 (2–3)	20 – Fornes	17 – Cacok	10 – Talley	Alumni Gym (1,833); Elon, NC
Jan 13, 2018; 7:00 pm		Northeastern	L 77–81 ^{OT}	5–13 (2–4)	24 – Fornes	8 – Fornes	4 – Talley	Trask Coliseum (4,006); Wilmington, NC
Jan 18, 2018; 7:00 pm		at College of Charleston	L 76–80	5–14 (2–5)	23 – Taylor	13 – Cacok	8 – Talley	TD Arena (3,649); Charleston, SC
Jan 20, 2018; 7:00 pm		Towson	W 73–71 ^{OT}	6–14 (3–5)	20 – Taylor	13 – Bryan	4 – Talley	Trask Coliseum (4,405); Wilmington, NC
Jan 25, 2018; 7:00 pm		James Madison	W 71–68	7–14 (4–5)	26 – Cacok	24 – Cacok	4 – Bryan	Trask Coliseum (3,988); Wilmington, NC
Jan 27, 2018; 7:00 pm		William & Mary	L 81–84	7–15 (4–6)	25 – Talley	15 – Cacok	4 – Talley	Trask Coliseum (4,384); Wilmington, NC
Feb 1, 2018; 7:00 pm		at Hofstra	L 76–96	7–16 (4–7)	21 – Talley	8 – Cacok	4 – Tied	Mack Sports Complex (1,952); Hempstead, NY
Feb 3, 2018; 4:00 pm		at Northeastern	L 100–107 ^{OT}	7–17 (4–8)	27 – Taylor	17 – Cacok	6 – Talley	Matthews Arena (1,341); Boston, MA
Feb 10, 2018; 7:00 pm		Hofstra	W 90–70	8–17 (5–8)	25 – Cacok	8 – 3 tied	7 – Brown	Trask Coliseum (5,200); Wilmington, NC
Feb 13, 2018; 7:00 pm		at James Madison	L 61–62	8–18 (5–9)	16 – Cacok	8 – Cacok	7 – Talley	JMU Convocation Center (1,038); Harrisonburg, VA
Feb 15, 2018; 7:00 pm		Elon	W 87–63	9–18 (6–9)	19 – Taylor	21 – Cacok	5 – Talley	Trask Coliseum (4,173); Wilmington, NC
Feb 17, 2018; 7:00 pm		College of Charleston	L 74–88	9–19 (6–10)	29 – Cacok	17 – Cacok	6 – Talley	Trask Coliseum (4,809); Wilmington, NC
Feb 22, 2018; 7:00 pm		at William & Mary	L 83–96	9–20 (6–11)	27 – Fornes	12 – Cacok	9 – Talley	Kaplan Arena (3,912); Williamsburg, VA
Feb 24, 2018; 4:00 pm		at Drexel	W 83–82	10–20 (7–11)	23 – Taylor	21 – Cacok	8 – Talley	Daskalakis Athletic Center (1,094); Philadelphia, PA
CAA tournament
Mar 4, 2018; 8:30 pm	(6)	vs. (3) Hofstra; Quarterfinals	W 93–88	11–20	37 – Talley	9 – Cacok	7 – Talley	North Charleston Coliseum (2,566); North Charleston, SC
Mar 5, 2018; 8:30 pm, CBSSN	(6)	vs. (2) Northeastern; Semifinals	L 52–79	11–21	15 – Cacok	9 – Tied	3 – Fornes	North Charleston Coliseum (4,099); North Charleston, SC
*Non-conference game. ^{#}Rankings from AP poll. (#) Tournament seedings in parentheses. All times are in Eastern Time..
