= 2016–17 Hofstra Pride men's basketball team =

American college basketball season

2016–17 Hofstra Pride men's basketball
- Conference: Colonial Athletic Association
- Record: 15–17 (7–11 CAA)
- Head coach: Joe Mihalich (4th season)
- Assistant coaches: Mike Farrelly; Speedy Claxton; Lamar Barrett
- Home arena: Mack Sports Complex

2016–17 CAA men's basketball standings
	Conf.				Overall
Team	W		L	PCT	W		L	PCT
UNC Wilmington †	15	–	3	.833	29	–	6	.829
College of Charleston	14	–	4	.778	25	–	10	.714
Towson	11	–	7	.611	20	–	13	.606
Elon	10	–	8	.556	18	–	14	.563
William & Mary	10	–	8	.556	17	–	14	.548
Northeastern	8	–	10	.444	15	–	16	.484
Hofstra	7	–	11	.389	15	–	17	.469
James Madison	7	–	11	.389	10	–	23	.303
Delaware	5	–	13	.278	13	–	20	.394
Drexel	3	–	15	.167	9	–	23	.281
† 2017 CAA tournament winner

The 2016–17 Hofstra Pride men's basketball team represented Hofstra University during the 2016–17 NCAA Division I men's basketball season. The Pride, led by fourth-year head coach Joe Mihalich, played their home games at Mack Sports Complex as members of the Colonial Athletic Association. They finished the season 15–17, 7–11 in CAA play to finish in a tie for seventh place. They lost in the first round of the CAA tournament to Delaware.

== Previous season ==
The Pride finished the 2015–16 season 24–10, 14–4 in CAA play to finish in a tie for the CAA championship with UNC Wilmington. They advanced to the championship game of the CAA tournament where they lost to UNC Wilmington. As a regular season champion who failed to win their league tournament, they received an automatic bid to the National Invitation Tournament where they lost in the first round to George Washington.

== Departures ==
Name	Number	Pos.	Height	Weight	Year	Hometown	Notes
Malik Nichols	0	G/F	6'6"	210	Senior	Queens, NY	Graduated
Juan'ya Green	1	G	6'2"	195	RS Senior	Philadelphia, PA	Graduated
Ameen Tanksley	2	G/F	6'5"	230	RS Senior	Philadelphia, PA	Graduated
Denton Koon	12	F	6'8"	210	RS Senior	Liberty, MO	Graduated
Ibrahim Djambo	42	F/C	6'10"	215	RS Senior	Bamako, Mali	Graduated

=== Incoming transfers ===
Name	Number	Pos.	Height	Weight	Year	Hometown	Previous School
Ty Greer	0	F	6'6"	210	Junior	Chicago, IL	Junior college transferred from Daytona State College.

== 2016 recruiting class ==
College recruiting information
Name	Hometown	School	Height	Weight	Commit date
Elijah Pemberton #45 SF	Middletown, CT	Cheshire Academy	6 ft 7 in (2.01 m)	N/A	Oct 19, 2015
Elijah Pemberton #45 SF	Recruit ratings: Scout: Rivals: (76)				
Stafford Trueheart II; SF	Lancaster, NY	Canisius High School	6 ft 8 in (2.03 m)	195 lb (88 kg)	Aug 4, 2016
Stafford Trueheart II; SF	Recruit ratings: Scout: Rivals: (0)				
Overall recruit ranking:
Note: In many cases, Scout, Rivals, 247Sports, On3, and ESPN may conflict in their listings of height and weight.; In these cases, the average was taken. ESPN grades are on a 100-point scale.; Sources: "2016 Team Ranking". Rivals.

== Roster ==
2016–17 Hofstra Pride men's basketball team
Players
Coaches

Pos.	#	Name	Height	Weight	Year	Previous school	Hometown
F	0	Ty Greer	6 ft 6 in (1.98 m)	210 lb (95 kg)	Jr	Daytona State College	Chicago, Illinois
G	2	Deron Powers	6 ft 0 in (1.83 m)	170 lb (77 kg)	RS Sr	Hampton	Williamsburg, Virginia
G	3	Justin Wright-Foreman	6 ft 0 in (1.83 m)	184 lb (83 kg)	So	High School of Construction	Queens, New York
G	4	Desure Buie	6 ft 0 in (1.83 m)	155 lb (70 kg)	So	Wings Academy	Bronx, New York
G	5	Eli Pemberton	6 ft 4 in (1.93 m)	190 lb (86 kg)	Fr	Cheshire Academy	Middletown, Connecticut
F/C	11	Rokas Gustys	6 ft 9 in (2.06 m)	260 lb (118 kg)	Jr	Oak Hill Academy (VA)	Kaunas, Lithuania
F	12	Tommy Ros (W)	6 ft 8 in (2.03 m)	210 lb (95 kg)	Fr	Saint Andrew's School (FL)	Paris, France
G	14	Brian Bernardi	6 ft 2 in (1.88 m)	195 lb (88 kg)	RS Sr	SMU	Staten Island, New York
F	15	Stafford Trueheart	6 ft 8 in (2.03 m)	195 lb (88 kg)	Fr	Canisius High School	Lancaster, New York
G	23	Connor Klementowicz (W)	6 ft 3 in (1.91 m)	195 lb (88 kg)	Fr	Gill St. Bernard's School	Freehold, New Jersey
G/F	24	Jamall Robinson	6 ft 5 in (1.96 m)	208 lb (94 kg)	Jr	Paul VI Catholic High School	Cheltenham, Maryland
F	33	Hunter Sabety	6 ft 9 in (2.06 m)	290 lb (132 kg)	RS Jr	Tufts	Oceanside, New York
F/C	44	Andre Walker	6 ft 10 in (2.08 m)	230 lb (104 kg)	Jr	Bullis School	Gaithersburg, Maryland

Head coach

- Joe Mihalich (La Salle)

Assistant coach(es)

- Mike Farrelly (Saint Joseph's)
- Speedy Claxton (Hofstra)
- Lamar Barrett (Elizabeth City State)

Legend

- (C) Team captain
- (S) Suspended
- (I) Ineligible
- (W) Walk-on
- Injured
- Current redshirt

Roster

== Schedule and results ==
Date time, TV	Rank^{#}	Opponent^{#}	Result	Record	High points	High rebounds	High assists	Site (attendance) city, state
Non-conference regular season
November 11*; 7:00 pm		Coppin State	W 74–72	1–0	20 – Pemberton	23 – Gustys	5 – Powers	Mack Sports Complex (1,684); Hempstead, NY
November 15*; 7:00 pm		at Sacred Heart	L 86–90	1–1	23 – Pemberton	13 – Gustys	4 – Buie	William H. Pitt Center (579); Fairfield, CT
November 18*; 7:00 pm		at Manhattan	L 68–80	1–2	17 – Wright-Foreman	8 – Gustys	5 – Bernardi	Draddy Gymnasium (1,109); Riverdale, NY
November 21*; 1:30 pm		vs. Bradley; Gulf Coast Showcase quarterfinals	W 92–90	2–2	19 – Powers	12 – Gustys	5 – Powers	Germain Arena; Estero, FL
November 22*; 5:00 pm		vs. Vermont; Gulf Coast Showcase	L 73–87	2–3	21 – Pemberton	11 – Gustys	2 – Buie	Germain Arena; Estero, FL
November 23*; 5:00 pm		vs. South Dakota; Gulf Coast Showcase	W 65–57	3–3	18 – Powers	25 – Gustys	2 – Powers, Gustys, Buie	Germain Arena; Estero, FL
November 25*; 4:00 pm		Medaille; Gulf Coast Showcase	W 89–56	4–3	18 – Wright-Foreman	14 – Gustys	6 – Pemberton	Mack Sports Complex (1,012); Hempstead, NY
November 29*; 7:00 pm		at Columbia	W 88–86	5–3	21 – Bernardi	8 – Greer	8 – Powers	Levien Gymnasium (763); New York City, NY
December 3*; 7:00 pm		at Florida Atlantic	W 88–80	6–3	22 – Pemberton	15 – Gustys	8 – Powers	FAU Arena (1,259); Boca Raton, FL
December 6*; 7:00 pm		St. Bonaventure	L 75–81	6–4	20 – Gustys	9 – Gustys	6 – Powers	Mack Sports Complex (2,112); Hempstead, NY
December 11*; 3:00 pm, ESPN		vs. No. 6 Kentucky; Brooklyn Hoops Winter Festival	L 73–96	6–5	18 – Powers	8 – Gustys	5 – Powers	Barclays Center (7,514); Brooklyn, NY
December 13*; 7:00 pm		Stony Brook	W 96–58	7–5	22 – Wright-Foreman	18 – Gustys	7 – Powers	Mack Sports Complex (2,352); Hempstead, NY
December 22*; 7:00 pm		Siena	W 84-64	8-5	21 – Powers	15 – Gustys	8 – Powers	Mack Sports Complex (1,674); Hempstead, NY
CAA regular season
December 31; 2:00 pm		at Delaware	W 58–56	9–5 (1–0)	17 – Greer	11 – Gustys	5 – Powers	Bob Carpenter Center (1,589); Newark, DE
January 2; 4:00 pm		William & Mary	L 93–95 ^{OT}	9–6 (1–1)	18 – Bernardi	11 – Gustys	7 – Powers	Mack Sports Complex (1,702); Hempstead, NY
January 5; 7:00 pm		James Madison	L 54–62	9–7 (1–2)	25 – Wright-Foreman	12 – Gustys	5 – Powers	Mack Sports Complex (1,059); Hempstead, NY
January 7; 4:00 pm		at College of Charleston	L 71–77	9–8 (1–3)	21 – Pemberton	8 – Gustys	5 – Pemberton	TD Arena (3,604); Charleston, SC
January 12; 7:00 pm		at Elon	L 80–96	9–9 (1–4)	21 – Powers	9 – Pemberton	8 – Powers	Alumni Gym (1,277); Elon, NC
January 14; 2:00 pm		at UNC Wilmington	L 76–84	9–10 (1–5)	20 – Powers	16 – Gustys	8 – Powers	Trask Coliseum (4,808); Wilmington, NC
January 19; 7:00 pm		at Towson	L 80–86	9–11 (1–6)	26 – Pemberton	8 – Gustys	6 – Powers	SECU Arena (1,331); Towson, MD
January 21; 4:00 pm		Northeastern	W 78–73	10–11 (2–6)	30 – Wright-Foreman	8 – Gustys	6 – Powers	Mack Sports Complex (2,629); Hempstead, NY
January 26; 7:00 pm		at Drexel	L 80–81 ^{OT}	10–12 (2–7)	30 – Wright-Foreman	11 – Greer	5 – Powers	Daskalakis Athletic Center (717); Philadelphia, PA
January 28; 4:00 pm		Elon	L 70–84	10–13 (2–8)	20 – Bernardi, Wright-Foreman	5 – 3 tied	4 – Powers, Wright-Foreman	Mack Sports Complex (2,211); Hempstead, NY
February 2; 7:00 pm		Delaware	W 73–65	11–13 (3–8)	22 – Wright-Forman	15 – Sabety	6 – Powers	Mack Sports Complex (1,142); Hempstead, NY
February 4; 7:00 pm		Drexel	W 79–77	12–13 (4–8)	20 – Powers, Wright-Foreman	7 – Sabety	6 – Powers	Mack Sports Complex (2,819); Hempstead, NY
February 9; 7:00 pm		Towson	L 65–69	12–14 (4–9)	29 – Wright-Foreman	8 – Sabety	6 – Powers	Mack Sports Complex (1,856); Hempstead, NY
February 11; 7:00 pm		at Northeastern	W 74–64	13–14 (5–9)	25 – Wright-Foreman	12 – Gustys	4 – Pemberton	Matthews Arena (1,032); Boston, MA
February 16; 7:00 pm, ASN		College of Charleston	L 72–76	13–15 (5–10)	26 – Wright-Foreman	12 – Gustys	11 – Powers	Mack Sports Complex (1,619); Hempstead, NY
February 18; 4:00 pm, ASN		UNC Wilmington	L 76–83	13–16 (5–11)	26 – Wright-Foreman	12 – Gustys	4 – Wright-Foreman	Mack Sports Complex (2,611); Hempstead, NY
February 23; 7:00 pm		at William & Mary	W 96–82	14–16 (6–11)	35 – Wright-Foreman	15 – Gustys	5 – Powers	Kaplan Arena (2,559); Williamsburg, VA
February 25; 12:00 pm, ASN		at James Madison	W 71–66	15–16 (7–11)	19 – Wright-Foreman	14 – Gustys	5 – Powers	JMU Convocation Center (4,276); Harrisonburg, VA
CAA tournament
March 3, 2017; 6:00 pm	(8)	vs. (9) Delaware; First round	L 76–81	15–17	23 – Wright-Foreman	9 – Gustys	3 – 3 tied	North Charleston Coliseum (1,889); North Charleston, SC
*Non-conference game. ^{#}Rankings from AP. (#) Tournament seedings in parentheses. All times are in Eastern Time.

== See also ==
2016–17 Hofstra Pride women's basketball team
