= 2016–17 James Madison Dukes men's basketball team =

American college basketball season

2016–17 James Madison Dukes men's basketball
- Conference: Colonial Athletic Association
- Record: 10–23 (7–11 CAA)
- Head coach: Louis Rowe (1st season)
- Assistant coaches: Mike Deane; Byron Taylor; David Kontaxis
- Home arena: JMU Convocation Center

2016–17 CAA men's basketball standings
	Conf.				Overall
Team	W		L	PCT	W		L	PCT
UNC Wilmington †	15	–	3	.833	29	–	6	.829
College of Charleston	14	–	4	.778	25	–	10	.714
Towson	11	–	7	.611	20	–	13	.606
Elon	10	–	8	.556	18	–	14	.563
William & Mary	10	–	8	.556	17	–	14	.548
Northeastern	8	–	10	.444	15	–	16	.484
Hofstra	7	–	11	.389	15	–	17	.469
James Madison	7	–	11	.389	10	–	23	.303
Delaware	5	–	13	.278	13	–	20	.394
Drexel	3	–	15	.167	9	–	23	.281
† 2017 CAA tournament winner

The 2016–17 James Madison Dukes men's basketball team represented James Madison University during the 2016–17 NCAA Division I men's basketball season. The Dukes, led by first-year head coach Louis Rowe, played their home games at the James Madison University Convocation Center in Harrisonburg, Virginia as members of the Colonial Athletic Association. They finished the season 10–23, 7–11 in CAA play to finish in a tie for seventh place. They defeated Drexel in the first round of the CAA tournament to advance to the quarterfinals where they lost to College of Charleston.

== Previous season ==
The Dukes finished the 2015–16 season 21–11, 11–7 record in CAA play to finish in a tie for third place. The Dukes lost in the quarterfinals of CAA tournament to William & Mary.

Despite finishing with 21 wins, on March 14, 2016, James Madison fired head coach Matt Brady. He was 139–127 in eight seasons with James Madison. On March 31, 2016, the school hired Louis Rowe, a JMU alum, as head coach.

== Departures ==
Name	Number	Pos.	Height	Weight	Year	Hometown	Notes
Devontae Morgan	0	G	6'4"	190	RS Junior	Tampa, FL	Left the team for personal reasons
Ron Curry	2	G	6'4"	200	Senior	Pennsauken, NJ	Graduated
Winston Grays	3	G	6'2"	175	Senior	Cleveland, OH	Graduated
Kevin Kangni	35	G	6'2"	190	Freshman	Amelia Courthouse, VA	Transferred to West Virginia Wesleyan

=== Incoming transfers ===
Name	Number	Pos.	Height	Weight	Year	Hometown	Previous School
Stuckey Mosley	3	G	6'3"	180	Junior	Orlando, FL	Transferred from Toledo. Under NCAA transfer rules, Mosley will have to sit out for the 2016–17 season. Will have two years of remaining eligibility.
Terrence Johnson	11	G	6'3"	190	Sophomore	Tempe, AZ	Junior college transferred from South Mountain Community College.
Vince Holmes	13	G	6'4"	185	Sophomore	Jupiter, FL	Junior college transferred from Otero Junior College.
Gerron Scissum	22	F	6'7"	210	Sophomore	Huntsville, AL	Transferred from VCU. Under NCAA transfer rules, Scissum will have to sit out for the 2016–17 season. Will have three years of remaining eligibility.

== Recruiting ==
James Madison did not have any incoming players in the 2016 recruiting class.

== Roster ==
2016–17 James Madison Dukes men's basketball team
Players
Coaches

Pos.	#	Name	Height	Weight	Year	Previous school	Hometown
G/F	1	Shakir Brown	6 ft 6 in (1.98 m)	225 lb (102 kg)	Sr	Angelina College	Baltimore, Maryland
G	3	Stuckey Mosley (I) (redshirt)	6 ft 3 in (1.91 m)	190 lb (86 kg)	Jr	Toledo	Orlando, Florida
G	4	Joey McLean	6 ft 0 in (1.83 m)	150 lb (68 kg)	Jr	High Point Christian Academy	Greensboro, North Carolina
G	10	Jackson Kent	6 ft 7 in (2.01 m)	200 lb (91 kg)	Sr	High Point Christian Academy	High Point, North Carolina
G	11	Terrence Johnson	6 ft 4 in (1.93 m)	195 lb (88 kg)	So	South Mountain Community College	Tucson, Arizona
G	12	Vince Holmes	6 ft 4 in (1.93 m)	185 lb (84 kg)	So	Otero Junior College	Jupiter, Florida
F	13	Paulius Satkus	6 ft 8 in (2.03 m)	230 lb (104 kg)	Sr	Barking Abbey School	Raudondvaris, Lithuania
G	14	Tyriq Nady	5 ft 10 in (1.78 m)	195 lb (88 kg)	Fr	Hargrave Military Academy	Virginia Beach, Virginia
F	15	Tom Vodanovich	6 ft 7 in (2.01 m)	220 lb (100 kg)	Sr	St. Patrick's College	Wellington, New Zealand
F	21	Dimitrije Cabarkapa	6 ft 10 in (2.08 m)	240 lb (109 kg)	RS Sr	High Medical School	Novi Sad, Serbia
F	22	Gerron Scissum (I) (redshirt)	6 ft 8 in (2.03 m)	205 lb (93 kg)	So	VCU	Huntsville, Alabama
F	23	Ramone Snowden	6 ft 6 in (1.98 m)	230 lb (104 kg)	RS Jr	Niagara	Virginia Beach, Virginia
F	40	Yohanny Dalembert	6 ft 8 in (2.03 m)	240 lb (109 kg)	Sr	Lower Merion High School	Port-au-Prince, Haiti
F	55	Ivan Lukic	6 ft 9 in (2.06 m)	230 lb (104 kg)	Sr	ABCD Academy	Loznica, Serbia

Head coach

- Louis Rowe (James Madison)

Assistant coach(es)

- Mike Deane (SUNY Potsdam)
- Byron Taylor (Florida A&M)
- David Kontaxis

Legend

- (C) Team captain
- (S) Suspended
- (I) Ineligible
- (W) Walk-on
- Injured
- Current redshirt

Roster

== Schedule and results ==
Date time, TV	Rank^{#}	Opponent^{#}	Result	Record	Site (attendance) city, state
Non-conference regular season
11/11/2016*; 7:00 pm		at Old Dominion; Rivalry	L 55–62	0–1	Ted Constant Convocation Center (8,241); Norfolk, VA
11/13/2016*; 2:00 pm		Rice	L 70–94	0–2	JMU Convocation Center (3,480); Harrisonburg, VA
11/18/2016*; 9:00 pm		at Montana State	L 73–80	0–3	Brick Breeden Fieldhouse (2,539); Bozeman, MT
11/21/2016*; 7:00 pm		Texas Southern	L 56–67	0–4	JMU Convocation Center (2,311); Harrisonburg, VA
11/23/2016*; 4:00 pm		Louisiana–Lafayette	L 70–82	0–5	JMU Convocation Center (2,200); Harrisonburg, VA
11/26/2016*; 6:00 pm		at George Mason	L 77–80 ^{OT}	0–6	EagleBank Arena (4,192); Fairfax, VA
11/30/2016*; 7:00 pm		at Charlotte	L 56–65	0–7	Dale F. Halton Arena (3,433); Charlotte, NC
12/03/2016*; 5:00 pm		at Longwood	W 71–59	1–7	Willett Hall (1,508); Farmville, VA
12/10/2016*; 1:00 pm, ESPN3		at Western Michigan	L 67–74	1–8	University Arena (1,968); Kalamazoo, MI
12/17/2016*; 1:00 pm		at Appalachian State	L 61–73	1–9	Holmes Center (422); Boone, NC
12/20/2016*; 7:00 pm		Richmond	L 55–75	1–10	JMU Convocation Center (2,383); Harrisonburg, VA
12/23/2016*; 7:00 pm		UMBC	L 61–62	1–11	JMU Convocation Center (2,358); Harrisonburg, VA
12/28/2016*; 7:00 pm		Eastern Mennonite	W 82–65	2–11	JMU Convocation Center (2,670); Harrisonburg, VA
CAA regular season
12/31/2016; 2:00 pm		Drexel	W 78–67	3–11 (1–0)	JMU Convocation Center (3,212); Harrisonburg, VA
01/02/2017; 7:00 pm		Towson	W 64–44	4–11 (2–0)	JMU Convocation Center (2,303); Harrisonburg, VA
01/05/2017; 7:00 pm		at Hofstra	W 62–54	5–11 (3–0)	Mack Sports Complex (1,059); Hempstead, NY
01/07/2017; 7:00 pm		at Northeastern	L 54–64	5–12 (3–1)	Matthews Arena (1,354); Boston, MA
01/12/2017; 7:00 pm		College of Charleston	L 51–53	5–13 (3–2)	JMU Convocation Center (2,768); Harrisonburg, VA
01/14/2017; 4:00 pm		Elon	W 60–59	6–13 (4–2)	JMU Convocation Center (2,918); Harrisonburg, VA
01/19/2017; 7:00 pm		at William & Mary	L 72–73	6–14 (4–3)	Kaplan Arena (3,076); Williamsburg, VA
01/21/2017; 4:00 pm		at College of Charleston	L 60–73	6–15 (4–4)	TD Arena (3,889); Charleston, SC
01/26/2017; 7:00 pm		UNC Wilmington	L 76–87	6–16 (4–5)	JMU Convocation Center (2,849); Harrisonburg, VA
01/28/2017; 7:00 pm		at Delaware	L 61–66	6–17 (4–6)	Bob Carpenter Center (2,628); Newark, DE
02/02/2017; 7:00 pm, ASN		at Elon	L 61–67	6–18 (4–7)	Alumni Gym (1,535); Elon, NC
02/04/2017; 4:00 pm		Northeastern	W 73–69	7–18 (5–7)	JMU Convocation Center (3,543); Harrisonburg, VA
02/09/2017; 7:00 pm		at UNC Wilmington	L 73–88	7–19 (5–8)	Trask Coliseum (4,439); Wilmington, NC
02/11/2017; 4:00 pm		Delaware	L 57–58	7–20 (5–9)	JMU Convocation Center (2,883); Harrisonburg, VA
02/16/2017; 7:00 pm		William & Mary	W 95–92 ^{OT}	8–20 (6–9)	JMU Convocation Center (2,854); Harrisonburg, VA
02/18/2017; 7:00 pm, CSNMA		at Towson	L 75–85	8–21 (6–10)	SECU Arena (2,871); Towson, MD
02/23/2017; 7:00 pm		at Drexel	W 70–64	9–21 (7–10)	Daskalakis Athletic Center (858); Philadelphia, PA
02/25/2017; 12:00 pm, ASN		Hofstra	L 66–71	9–22 (7–11)	JMU Convocation Center (4,276); Harrisonburg, VA
CAA tournament
03/03/2017; 8:30 pm	(7)	vs. (10) Drexel; First round	W 80–70	10–22	North Charleston Coliseum (1,889); North Charleston, SC
03/04/2017; 6:00 pm, CSN	(7)	vs. (2) College of Charleston; Quarterfinals	L 62–67	10–23	North Charleston Coliseum (4,212); North Charleston, SC
*Non-conference game. ^{#}Rankings from AP Poll. (#) Tournament seedings in parentheses. All times are in Eastern Time Source.

== See also ==
2016–17 James Madison Dukes women's basketball team
