= 2016–17 William & Mary Tribe men's basketball team =

American college basketball season

2016–17 William & Mary Tribe men's basketball
- Conference: Colonial Athletic Association
- Record: 17–14 (10–8 CAA)
- Head coach: Tony Shaver (14th season)
- Assistant coaches: Jonathan Holmes; Kotie Kimble; Austin Shaver
- Home arena: Kaplan Arena

2016–17 CAA men's basketball standings
	Conf.				Overall
Team	W		L	PCT	W		L	PCT
UNC Wilmington †	15	–	3	.833	29	–	6	.829
College of Charleston	14	–	4	.778	25	–	10	.714
Towson	11	–	7	.611	20	–	13	.606
Elon	10	–	8	.556	18	–	14	.563
William & Mary	10	–	8	.556	17	–	14	.548
Northeastern	8	–	10	.444	15	–	16	.484
Hofstra	7	–	11	.389	15	–	17	.469
James Madison	7	–	11	.389	10	–	23	.303
Delaware	5	–	13	.278	13	–	20	.394
Drexel	3	–	15	.167	9	–	23	.281
† 2017 CAA tournament winner

The 2016–17 William & Mary Tribe men's basketball team represented the College of William & Mary during the 2016–17 NCAA Division I men's basketball season. The Tribe were coached by 14th-year head coach Tony Shaver. The team played its home games at Kaplan Arena as members of the Colonial Athletic Association. The Tribe finished the season 17–14, 10–8 in CAA play to finish in a tie for fourth place. As the No. 4 seed in the CAA tournament, they defeated Elon in the quarterfinals before losing to UNC Wilmington in the semifinals. The Tribe did not participate in any postseason tournaments.

The season marked the 112th season of the collegiate basketball program at William & Mary.

== Previous season ==
The Tribe finished the 2015–16 season 20–11, 11–7 in CAA play to finish in a three-way tie for third place. They defeated James Madison to advance to the semifinals of the CAA tournament where they lost Hofstra.

== Offseason ==
=== Departures ===
Name	Number	Pos.	Height	Weight	Year	Hometown	Notes
Terry Tarpey	25	G/F	6'5"	210	Senior	Stamford, CT	Graduated
Sean Sheldon	31	F	6'9"	256	Senior	Traverse City, MI	Graduated
Hunter Seacat	50	F	6'9"	235	Sophomore	Mooresville, NC	Transferred to Appalachian State

=== Incoming transfers ===
Name	Number	Pos.	Height	Weight	Year	Hometown	Previous School
Matt Milon	2	G	6'4"	200	Sophomore	Ovideo, FL	Boston College

- Under NCAA transfer rules, Milon will have to sit out for the 2016–17 season. Will have three years of remaining eligibility.

=== Recruiting Class of 2016 ===
College recruiting information
Name	Hometown	School	Height	Weight	Commit date
Nathan Knight #80 PF	Syracuse, NY	Kimball Union Academy	6 ft 9 in (2.06 m)	255 lb (116 kg)	Oct 5, 2015
Nathan Knight #80 PF	Recruit ratings: Scout: Rivals: (67)				
Justin Pierce; SF	Glen Ellyn, IL	Glenbard West High School	6 ft 6 in (1.98 m)	205 lb (93 kg)	
Justin Pierce; SF	Recruit ratings: Scout: Rivals: (NR)				
Overall recruit ranking:
Note: In many cases, Scout, Rivals, 247Sports, On3, and ESPN may conflict in their listings of height and weight.; In these cases, the average was taken. ESPN grades are on a 100-point scale.; Sources: "2016 Team Ranking". Rivals.

=== Recruiting Class of 2017 ===
College recruiting information (2017)
Name	Hometown	School	Height	Weight	Commit date
Jihar Williams; SG	Baltimore, MD	Friends School of Baltimore	6 ft 5 in (1.96 m)	190 lb (86 kg)	Jun 22, 2016
Jihar Williams; SG	Recruit ratings: Scout: Rivals: (NR)				
Luke Loewe; PG	Fond du Lac, WI	Fond du Lac High School	6 ft 2 in (1.88 m)	170 lb (77 kg)	Jul 28, 2016
Luke Loewe; PG	Recruit ratings: Scout: Rivals: (NR)				
Overall recruit ranking:
Note: In many cases, Scout, Rivals, 247Sports, On3, and ESPN may conflict in their listings of height and weight.; In these cases, the average was taken. ESPN grades are on a 100-point scale.; Sources: "2016 Team Ranking". Rivals.

== Roster ==
2016–17 William & Mary Tribe men's basketball team
Players
Coaches

Pos.	#	Name	Height	Weight	Year	Previous school	Hometown
G	0	Daniel Dixon	6 ft 6 in (1.98 m)	210 lb (95 kg)	Sr	Langley/Fishburne	Great Falls, VA
G	1	Jamison Glover	6 ft 0 in (1.83 m)	185 lb (84 kg)	Jr	Battlefield	Haymarket, VA
G	2	Matt Milon (I) (redshirt)	6 ft 4 in (1.93 m)	200 lb (91 kg)	So	Oviedo/Boston College	Oviedo, FL
G/F	4	Omar Prewitt	6 ft 7 in (2.01 m)	195 lb (88 kg)	Sr	Montgomery County	Mount Sterling, KY
G/F	5	Greg Malinowski	6 ft 6 in (1.98 m)	210 lb (95 kg)	Jr	Episcopal	Chantilly, VA
G	10	Connor Burchfield	6 ft 4 in (1.93 m)	177 lb (80 kg)	Jr	Concord	Concord, NC
G	11	Michael Schlotman	6 ft 5 in (1.96 m)	200 lb (91 kg)	RS Jr	Munster	Munster, IN
C	13	Nathan Knight	6 ft 9 in (2.06 m)	255 lb (116 kg)	Fr	Nottingham/Kimball Union Academy	Syracuse, NY
G	21	Oliver Tot	6 ft 6 in (1.98 m)	205 lb (93 kg)	Jr	Kimball Union Academy	Bratislava, Slovakia
F	22	Paul Rowley	6 ft 8 in (2.03 m)	200 lb (91 kg)	RS So	Loudoun Valley	Purcellville, VA
G/F	23	Justin Pierce	6 ft 6 in (1.98 m)	205 lb (93 kg)	Fr	Glenbard West	Glen Ellyn, IL
G	34	David Cohn	6 ft 2 in (1.88 m)	168 lb (76 kg)	RS Jr	York/Colorado State	Elmhurst, IL
F	41	Jack Whitman	6 ft 9 in (2.06 m)	235 lb (107 kg)	Jr	Lexington Catholic	Lexington, KY

Head coach

- Tony Shaver (North Carolina)

Assistant coach(es)

- Jonathan Holmes (North Carolina)
- Kotie Kimble (Coastal Carolina)
- Austin Shaver (Virginia)

Legend

- (C) Team captain
- (S) Suspended
- (I) Ineligible
- (W) Walk-on
- Injured
- Current redshirt

Roster

== Schedule and results ==
Date time, TV	Rank^{#}	Opponent^{#}	Result	Record	Site (attendance) city, state
Non-conference regular season
November 11*; 2:00 pm		Bridgewater	W 96–44	1–0	Kaplan Arena (2,404); Williamsburg, VA
November 14*; 7:00 pm, RSN/CSN		at No. 12 Louisville	L 58–91	1–1	KFC Yum! Center (19,304); Louisville, KY
November 19*; 7:00 pm		Presbyterian	W 89–59	2–1	Kaplan Arena (2,315); Williamsburg, VA
November 23*; 7:00 pm, ESPNU		at No. 6 Duke	L 67–88	2–2	Cameron Indoor Stadium (9,314); Durham, NC
November 26*; 4:00 pm		Liberty	W 79–70	3–2	Kaplan Arena (3,039); Williamsburg, VA
November 29*; 7:00 pm, ESPN3		at Central Michigan	L 81–91	3–3	McGuirk Arena (2,453); Mount Pleasant, MI
December 3*; 4:00 pm		at Hampton	L 69–79	3–4	Hampton Convocation Center (3,123); Hampton, VA
December 16*; 7:00 pm		Milligan	W 113–59	4–4	Kaplan Arena (1,754); Williamsburg, VA
December 19*; 7:00 pm		Savannah State	W 112–85	5–4	Kaplan Arena (1,377); Williamsburg, VA
December 22*; 7:00 pm		at Rhode Island	L 62–73	5–5	Ryan Center (3,570); Kingston, RI
December 29*; 7:00 pm		at Old Dominion; Rivalry	W 65–54	6–5	Ted Constant Convocation Center (7,151); Norfolk, VA
CAA regular season
December 31; 2:00 pm		at Northeastern	L 64–84	6–6 (0–1)	Matthews Arena (960); Boston, MA
January 2; 4:00 pm		at Hofstra	W 95–93 ^{OT}	7–6 (1–1)	Mack Sports Complex (1,702); Hempstead, NY
January 5; 7:00 pm		Elon	W 88–85	8–6 (2–1)	Kaplan Arena (2,177); Williamsburg, VA
January 7; 4:00 pm		Drexel; Postponed to January 30 (Snow)			Kaplan Arena; Williamsburg, VA
January 12; 7:00 pm		at UNC Wilmington	L 77–101	8–7 (2–2)	Trask Coliseum (4,889); Wilmington, NC
January 14; 4:00 pm		at College of Charleston	L 67–77	8–8 (2–3)	TD Arena (3,722); Charleston, SC
January 19; 7:00 pm		James Madison	W 73–72	9–8 (3–3)	Kaplan Arena (3,076); Williamsburg, VA
January 21; 7:00 pm		at Elon	L 62–71	9–9 (3–4)	Alumni Gym (1,446); Elon, NC
January 26; 7:00 pm		Delaware	W 82–58	10–9 (4–4)	Kaplan Arena (2,276); Williamsburg, VA
January 28; 4:00 pm, CSN		UNC Wilmington	W 96–78	11–9 (5–4)	Kaplan Arena (3,239); Williamsburg, VA
January 30; 7:00 pm		Drexel	W 108–85	12–9 (6–4)	Kaplan Arena (1,895); Williamsburg, VA
February 2; 7:00 pm		Northeastern	W 94–69	13–9 (7–4)	Kaplan Arena (2,134); Williamsburg, VA
February 4; 4:00 pm, CSN		at Towson	L 80–82	13–10 (7–5)	SECU Arena (3,431); Towson, MD
February 9; 7:00 pm		at Drexel	L 61–79	13–11 (7–6)	Daskalakis Athletic Center (533); Philadelphia, PA
February 11; 2:00 pm, CSN		College of Charleston	W 89–79	14–11 (8–6)	Kaplan Arena (5,107); Williamsburg, VA
February 16; 7:00 pm		at James Madison	L 92–95 ^{OT}	14–12 (8–7)	JMU Convocation Center (2,854); Harrisonburg, VA
February 18; 7:00 pm		at Delaware	W 85–64	15–12 (9–7)	Bob Carpenter Center (3,619); Newark, DE
February 23; 7:00 pm		Hofstra	L 82–96	15–13 (9–8)	Kaplan Arena (2,559); Williamsburg, VA
February 25; 2:00 pm, CSN		Towson	W 83–79	16–13 (10–8)	Kaplan Arena (3,425); Williamsburg, VA
CAA Tournament
March 4; 2:30 pm, CSN	(4)	vs. (5) Elon; Quarterfinals	W 71–66	17–13	North Charleston Coliseum (4,096); North Charleston, SC
March 5; 2:00 pm, CSN	(4)	vs. (1) UNC Wilmington; Semifinals	L 94–105	17–14	North Charleston Coliseum (4,708); North Charleston, SC
*Non-conference game. ^{#}Rankings from AP Poll. (#) Tournament seedings in parentheses. All times are in Eastern Time Source.

== See also ==
- 2016–17 William & Mary Tribe women's basketball team
