= 2016–17 Elon Phoenix men's basketball team =

American college basketball season

2016–17 Elon Phoenix men's basketball
- Conference: Colonial Athletic Association
- Record: 18–14 (10–8 CAA)
- Head coach: Matt Matheny (8th season)
- Assistant coaches: Jack Wooten; Monty Sanders; Chris Long
- Home arena: Alumni Gym

2016–17 CAA men's basketball standings
	Conf.				Overall
Team	W		L	PCT	W		L	PCT
UNC Wilmington †	15	–	3	.833	29	–	6	.829
College of Charleston	14	–	4	.778	25	–	10	.714
Towson	11	–	7	.611	20	–	13	.606
Elon	10	–	8	.556	18	–	14	.563
William & Mary	10	–	8	.556	17	–	14	.548
Northeastern	8	–	10	.444	15	–	16	.484
Hofstra	7	–	11	.389	15	–	17	.469
James Madison	7	–	11	.389	10	–	23	.303
Delaware	5	–	13	.278	13	–	20	.394
Drexel	3	–	15	.167	9	–	23	.281
† 2017 CAA tournament winner

The 2016–17 Elon Phoenix men's basketball team represented Elon University during the 2016–17 NCAA Division I men's basketball season. The Phoenix, led by eighth-year head coach Matt Matheny, played their home games at Alumni Gym in Elon, North Carolina as third-year members of the Colonial Athletic Association. They finished the season 18–14, 10–8 in CAA play to finish in a tie for fourth place. As the No. 5 seed in the CAA tournament, they lost in the quarterfinals to William & Mary.

== Previous season ==
The Phoenix finished the 2015–16 season 16–16, 7–11 in CAA play to finish in eighth place. They lost in the first round of the CAA tournament to Drexel.

== Offseason ==
=== Departures ===
Name	Number	Pos.	Height	Weight	Year	Hometown	Notes
Tanner Samson	3	G	6'4"	195	Senior	Littleton, CO	Graduated
Sam Hershberger	5	G	6'0"	180	Senior	Vandalia, OH	Walk-on; graduated
Tony Sabato	15	C	6'7"	220	Senior	Cincinnati, OH	Graduated
West Brewer	30	F	6'7"	230	RS Junior	Burlington, NC	Walk-on; left the team due personal reasons

=== 2016 recruiting class ===
College recruiting information
Name	Hometown	School	Height	Weight	Commit date
Seth Fuller; PF	Dublin, OH	Dublin Coffman High School	5 ft 11 in (1.80 m)	N/A	Jul 27, 2015
Seth Fuller; PF	Recruit ratings: No ratings found				
Overall recruit ranking:
Note: In many cases, Scout, Rivals, 247Sports, On3, and ESPN may conflict in their listings of height and weight.; In these cases, the average was taken. ESPN grades are on a 100-point scale.; Sources: "Elon". ESPN.; "2016 Team Ranking". Rivals.

=== 2017 recruiting class ===
College recruiting information (2017)
Name	Hometown	School	Height	Weight	Commit date
Simon Wright; SF	Minnetonka, MN	Hopkins High School	6 ft 7 in (2.01 m)	N/A	
Simon Wright; SF	Recruit ratings: Scout: Rivals: ESPN: (0)				
Overall recruit ranking:
Note: In many cases, Scout, Rivals, 247Sports, On3, and ESPN may conflict in their listings of height and weight.; In these cases, the average was taken. ESPN grades are on a 100-point scale.; Sources: "Elon". ESPN.; "2016 Team Ranking". Rivals.

== Roster ==
2016–17 Elon Phoenix men's basketball team
Players
Coaches

Pos.	#	Name	Height	Weight	Year	Previous school	Hometown
F	00	Brian Dawkins	6 ft 8 in (2.03 m)	240 lb (109 kg)	RS Jr	Bishop Kenny	Jacksonville, FL
G	1	Luke Eddy	6 ft 0 in (1.83 m)	185 lb (84 kg)	Sr	George Washington	Charleston, WV
G	2	Dmitri Thompson	6 ft 4 in (1.93 m)	205 lb (93 kg)	Jr	Orlando Christian Prep	Orlando, FL
G	3	Seth Fuller	5 ft 11 in (1.8 m)	170 lb (77 kg)	Fr	Dublin Coffman	Dublin, OH
G/F	4	Collin Luther	6 ft 6 in (1.98 m)	210 lb (95 kg)	So	Hampton	Pittsburgh, PA
F/C	10	Karolis Kundrotas	6 ft 10 in (2.08 m)	240 lb (109 kg)	So	Barking Abbey School	Kaunas, Lithuania
G/F	12	Christian Hairston	6 ft 7 in (2.01 m)	205 lb (93 kg)	Sr	Greensboro Day School	Greensboro, NC
G	13	Dainan Swoope (W)	6 ft 0 in (1.83 m)	185 lb (84 kg)	So	Sunrise Christian Academy	Kansas City, KS
F	14	Jack Anton	6 ft 8 in (2.03 m)	240 lb (109 kg)	Jr	Archbishop Moeller	Mason, OH
G	20	Sheldon Eberhardt	6 ft 5 in (1.96 m)	185 lb (84 kg)	So	Middle Creek	Apex, NC
F	21	Jack George	6 ft 10 in (2.08 m)	210 lb (95 kg)	RS So	Carmel Catholic	Libertyville, IL
G	22	Steven Santa Ana	6 ft 4 in (1.93 m)	185 lb (84 kg)	So	Ardrey Kell	Charlotte, NC
G	25	Ryder Bowline (W)	6 ft 4 in (1.93 m)	225 lb (102 kg)	Sr	Forsyth Central	Cumming, GA
F	41	Tyler Seibring	6 ft 8 in (2.03 m)	225 lb (102 kg)	So	Normal Community	Normal, IL
G	42	Patrick Ryan (W)	6 ft 6 in (1.98 m)	210 lb (95 kg)	Sr	Greens Farms Academy	Darien, CT

Head coach

- Matt Matheny (Davidson)

Assistant coach(es)

- Jack Wooten (North Carolina)
- Monty Sanders (Elon)
- Chris Long (Elon)

Legend

- (C) Team captain
- (S) Suspended
- (I) Ineligible
- (W) Walk-on
- Injured
- Current redshirt

Roster

== Schedule and results ==
Date time, TV	Rank^{#}	Opponent^{#}	Result	Record	Site (attendance) city, state
Exhibition
Nov 1, 2016*; 8:00 pm		Randolph	W 88–43		Alumni Gym; Elon, NC
Non-conference regular season
Nov 11, 2016; 8:00 pm		William Peace; NIU Thanksgiving Classic	W 101–68	1–0	Alumni Gym (1,131); Elon, NC
Nov 14, 2016*; 8:00 pm		Charlotte	L 95–100	1–1	Alumni Gym (1,478); Elon, NC
Nov 17, 2016*; 7:00 pm, ESPN3		at South Florida	W 74–61	2–1	USF Sun Dome (2,206); Orlando, FL
Nov 23, 2016*; 5:30 pm		vs. UIC; NIU Thanksgiving Classic	W 91–80	3–1	Convocation Center (844); DeKalb, IL
Nov 25, 2016*; 2:00 pm		at Northern Illinois; NIU Thanksgiving Classic	W 85–80	4–1	Convocation Center; DeKalb, IL
Nov 26, 2016*; 2:00 pm		vs. Cal Poly; NIU Thanksgiving Classic	W 72–66	5–1	Convocation Center; DeKalb, IL
Nov 30, 2016*; 7:00 pm		FIU	W 84–81 ^{OT}	6–1	Alumni Gym (1,388); Elon, NC
Dec 4, 2016*; 1:00 pm, FS1		at Georgetown; BB&T Classic	L 74–77	6–2	Verizon Center (8,645); Washington, D.C.
Dec 6, 2016*; 7:00 pm, 67–78		UNC Asheville	L 67–78	6–3	Alumni Gym (1,421); Elon, NC
Dec 10, 2016*; 4:00 pm		at Radford	L 56–68	6–4	Dedmon Center (1,177); Radford, VA
Dec 18, 2016*; 2:00 pm		at Saint Peter's	W 68–53	7–4	Yanitelli Center (500); Jersey City, NJ
Dec 21, 2016*; 6:00 pm, ESPN2		vs. No. 5 Duke	L 61–72	7–5	Greensboro Coliseum (9,733); Greensboro, NC
Dec 28, 2016*; 8:00 pm		Central Penn	W 89–60	8–5	Alumni Gym (847); Elon, NC
CAA regular season
Dec 31, 2016; 2:00 pm		College of Charleston	L 54–66	8–6 (0–1)	Alumni Gym (1,055); Elon, NC
Jan 2, 2017; 7:00 pm		at UNC Wilmington	L 63–79	8–7 (0–2)	Trask Coliseum (4,350); Wilmington, NC
Jan 5, 2017; 7:00 pm		at William & Mary	L 85–88	8–8 (0–3)	Kaplan Arena (2,117); Williamsburg, VA
Jan 7, 2017; 7:00 pm		Towson	W 72–61	9–8 (1–3)	Alumni Gym (884); Elon, NC
Jan 12, 2017; 7:00 pm		Hofstra	W 96–80	10–8 (2–3)	Alumni Gym (1,607); Elon, NC
Jan 14, 2017; 4:00 pm		at James Madison	L 59–60	10–9 (2–4)	JMU Convocation Center (2,918); Harrisonburg, VA
Jan 19, 2017; 7:00 pm		Drexel	W 93–73	11–9 (3–4)	Alumni Gym (1,452); Elon, NC
Jan 21, 2017; 7:00 pm		William & Mary	W 71–62	12–9 (4–4)	Alumni Gym (1,446); Elon, NC
Jan 26, 2017; 7:00 pm		at Northeastern	W 51–49	13–9 (5–4)	Matthews Arena (1,249); Boston, MA
Jan 28, 2017; 4:00 pm		at Hofstra	W 84–70	14–9 (6–4)	Mack Sports Complex; Hempstead, NY
Feb 2, 2017; 7:00 pm, ASN		James Madison	W 67–61	15–9 (7–4)	Alumni Gym (1,535); Elon, NC
Feb 4, 2017; 5:00 pm		at College of Charleston	L 58–71	15–10 (7–5)	TD Arena (4,081); Charleston, SC
Feb 9, 2017; 7:00 pm		at Delaware	L 74–76 ^{OT}	15–11 (7–6)	Bob Carpenter Center (1,784); Newark, DE
Feb 11, 2017; 4:00 pm, ASN		UNC Wilmington	W 77–76	16–11 (8–6)	Alumni Gym (1,738); Elon, NC
Feb 16, 2017; 7:00 pm		at Towson	L 66–85	16–12 (8–7)	SECU Arena (1,931); Towson, MD
Feb 18, 2017; 2:00 pm		at Drexel	W 65–56	17–12 (9–7)	Daskalakis Athletic Center (1,217); Philadelphia, PA
Feb 23, 2017; 7:00 pm		Northeastern	L 104–105 ^{2OT}	17–13 (9–8)	Alumni Gym (1,278); Elon, NC
Feb 25, 2017; 7:00 pm		Delaware	W 81–59	18–13 (10–8)	Alumni Gym (1,714); Elon, NC
CAA tournament
Mar 4, 2017; 2:30 pm, CSN	(5)	vs. (4) William & Mary; Quarterfinals	L 66–71	18–14	North Charleston Coliseum (4,096); North Charleston, SC
*Non-conference game. ^{#}Rankings from AP Poll. (#) Tournament seedings in parentheses. All times are in Eastern Time.

== See also ==
2016–17 Elon Phoenix women's basketball team
