= 2016–17 Towson Tigers men's basketball team =

American college basketball season

2016–17 Towson Tigers men's basketball
- Conference: Colonial Athletic Association
- Record: 20–13 (11–7 CAA)
- Head coach: Pat Skerry (6th season)
- Assistant coaches: Kevin Clark; Jim McCarthy; Pat O'Connell
- Home arena: SECU Arena

2016–17 CAA men's basketball standings
	Conf.				Overall
Team	W		L	PCT	W		L	PCT
UNC Wilmington †	15	–	3	.833	29	–	6	.829
College of Charleston	14	–	4	.778	25	–	10	.714
Towson	11	–	7	.611	20	–	13	.606
Elon	10	–	8	.556	18	–	14	.563
William & Mary	10	–	8	.556	17	–	14	.548
Northeastern	8	–	10	.444	15	–	16	.484
Hofstra	7	–	11	.389	15	–	17	.469
James Madison	7	–	11	.389	10	–	23	.303
Delaware	5	–	13	.278	13	–	20	.394
Drexel	3	–	15	.167	9	–	23	.281
† 2017 CAA tournament winner

The 2016–17 Towson Tigers men's basketball team represented Towson University during the 2016–17 NCAA Division I men's basketball season. The Tigers, led by sixth year head coach Pat Skerry, played their home games at SECU Arena in Towson, Maryland as members of the Colonial Athletic Association. They finished the season 20–13, 11–7 in CAA play to finish in third place. They defeated Northeastern in the quarterfinals of the CAA tournament to advance to the semifinals where they lost to College of Charleston. Despite a 20 win season, the Tigers declined to participate in a postseason tournament.

== Previous season ==
The Tigers finished the 2015–16 season 20–13, 11–7 in CAA play to finish in a three-way tie for third place. They lost in the quarterfinals of the CAA tournament to CAA tournament. The Tigers received an invitation to the inaugural Vegas 16, which only had eight teams, where they lost in the quarterfinals to Oakland.

== Departures ==
Name	Number	Pos.	Height	Weight	Year	Hometown	Notes
Josh Ivory	0	G	6'2"	195	Senior	Alexandria, LA	Graduated
Bryon Hawkins	1	G	6'1"	175	Sophomore	Fort Washington, MD	Transferred to Morgan State
Timajh Parker-Rivera	15	F	6'7"	215	Senior	Milford, CT	Graduated
A. J. Astroth	25	G	6'6"	200	RS Junior	Tampa, FL	Graduate transferred to Prairie View A&M

=== Incoming transfers ===
Name	Number	Pos.	Height	Weight	Year	Hometown	Previous School
Brian Starr	22	G	6'3"	190	Junior	Kansas City, MO	Junior college transferred from Colby Community College

== Recruiting ==
College recruiting information
Name	Hometown	School	Height	Weight	Commit date
J. J. Matthews #39 PF	Richmond, VA	Millwood School	6 ft 8 in (2.03 m)	185 lb (84 kg)	Sep 19, 2015
J. J. Matthews #39 PF	Recruit ratings: Scout: Rivals: (78)				
Justin Gorham #64 PF	Columbia, MD	Calvert Hall College High School	6 ft 7 in (2.01 m)	215 lb (98 kg)	Aug 4, 2015
Justin Gorham #64 PF	Recruit ratings: Scout: Rivals: (72)				
Zane Martin; SG	Philadelphia, PA	Neumann-Goretti High School	6 ft 4 in (1.93 m)	190 lb (86 kg)	
Zane Martin; SG	Recruit ratings: Scout: Rivals: (NR)				
Overall recruit ranking:
Note: In many cases, Scout, Rivals, 247Sports, On3, and ESPN may conflict in their listings of height and weight.; In these cases, the average was taken. ESPN grades are on a 100-point scale.; Sources: "Towson 2016 Basketball Commitments". Rivals.; "Towson Tigers". ESPN.; "2016 Team Ranking". Rivals.

=== Recruiting class of 2017 ===
College recruiting information (2017)
Name	Hometown	School	Height	Weight	Commit date
Quinton Drayton; SG	Bowie, MD	Bowie High School	6 ft 4 in (1.93 m)	N/A	Jun 20, 2016
Quinton Drayton; SG	Recruit ratings: Scout: Rivals: (78)				
Overall recruit ranking:
Note: In many cases, Scout, Rivals, 247Sports, On3, and ESPN may conflict in their listings of height and weight.; In these cases, the average was taken. ESPN grades are on a 100-point scale.; Sources: "Towson 2017 Basketball Commitments". Rivals.; "Towson Tigers". ESPN.; "2017 Team Ranking". Rivals.

== Roster ==
2016–17 Towson Tigers men's basketball team
Players
Coaches

Pos.	#	Name	Height	Weight	Year	Previous school	Hometown
G	0	Zane Martin	6 ft 4 in (1.93 m)	205 lb (93 kg)	Fr	Ss. Neumann-Goretti	Philadelphia, PA
F	1	J. J. Matthews	6 ft 8 in (2.03 m)	240 lb (109 kg)	Fr	Millwood School	Midlothian, VA
G	2	Jordan McNeil	6 ft 5 in (1.96 m)	185 lb (84 kg)	RS So	Mount St. Joseph	Baltimore, MD
G	3	Deshaun Morman	6 ft 3 in (1.91 m)	195 lb (88 kg)	RS Jr	Coolidge Senior HS; Cincinnati	Richmond, VA
F	4	Justin Gorham	6 ft 7 in (2.01 m)	215 lb (98 kg)	Fr	Calvert Hall	Baltimore, MD
F	5	Walter Foster	6 ft 8 in (2.03 m)	245 lb (111 kg)	Sr	Booker T. Washington	Atlanta, GA
F	10	John Davis	6 ft 5 in (1.96 m)	235 lb (107 kg)	Sr	Ss. Neumann-Goretti	Philadelphia, PA
F	11	Dennis Tunstall	6 ft 8 in (2.03 m)	215 lb (98 kg)	RS Fr	Life Center Academy	Medford, NJ
G	22	Brian Starr	6 ft 3 in (1.91 m)	190 lb (86 kg)	Jr	Fort Osage; Colby CC	Kansas City, MO
F	23	Mike Morsell	6 ft 5 in (1.96 m)	215 lb (98 kg)	So	St. John's College HS	Fort Washington, MD
F	24	Arnaud William Adala Moto	6 ft 7 in (2.01 m)	245 lb (111 kg)	RS Sr	Episcopal	Yaoundé, Cameroon
F	33	Eddie Keith	6 ft 5 in (1.96 m)	220 lb (100 kg)	Jr	Edgewater	Orlando, FL
F	44	Alex Thomas	6 ft 9 in (2.06 m)	250 lb (113 kg)	So	Coastal Academy	Hawthorne, NJ

Head coach

- Pat Skerry (Tufts)

Assistant coach(es)

- Kevin Clark (Clark)
- Jim McCarthy (Hamilton College)
- Pat O'Connell (Johns Hopkins)

Legend

- (C) Team captain
- (S) Suspended
- (I) Ineligible
- (W) Walk-on
- Injured
- Current redshirt

Roster

== Schedule and results ==
Date time, TV	Rank^{#}	Opponent^{#}	Result	Record	Site (attendance) city, state
Non-conference regular season
11/12/2016*; 7:00 pm, MASN		at George Mason	W 77–71	1–0	EagleBank Arena (4,814); Fairfax, VA
11/15/2016*; 7:00 pm		at Morgan State	W 78–72	2–0	Talmadge L. Hill Field House (3,047); Baltimore, MD
11/20/2016*; 2:00 pm		at Maryland; Barclays Center Classic	L 66–71	2–1	Xfinity Center (16,797); College Park, MD
11/22/2016*; 7:00 pm, ACCN Extra		at Boston College; Barclays Center Classic	L 70–80	2–2	Conte Forum (2,163); Chestnut Hill, MA
11/25/2016*; 5:00 pm		Stony Brook; Barclays Center Classic	W 88–63	3–2	SECU Arena (1,322); Towson, MD
11/26/2016*; 7:30 pm		Robert Morris; Barclays Center Classic	L 66–67	3–3	SECU Arena (1,211); Towson, MD
11/30/2016*; 7:00 pm		Goucher	W 99–37	4–3	SECU Arena (1,004); Towson, MD
12/03/2016*; 2:00 pm		Old Dominion	L 58–60	4–4	SECU Arena (1,871); Towson, MD
12/07/2016*; 7:00 pm		Loyola (MD)	W 70–53	5–4	SECU Arena (1,214); Towson, MD
12/10/2016*; 2:00 pm		Fairleigh Dickinson	W 90–87	6–4	SECU Arena (1,312); Towson, MD
12/17/2016*; 7:00 pm		at UMBC	W 73–72	7–4	Retriever Activities Center (1,311); Catonsville, MD
12/21/2016*; 5:30 pm		vs. Nevada; Las Vegas Holiday Hoops Classic	L 72–81	7–5	South Point Arena (218); Enterprise, NV
12/22/2016*; 3:15 pm		vs. Iona; Las Vegas Holiday Hoops Classic	W 76–69	8–5	South Point Arena (581); Enterprise, NV
CAA regular season
12/31/2016; 12:00 pm		UNC Wilmington	L 67–76	8–6 (0–1)	SECU Arena (1,795); Towson, MD
01/02/2017; 7:00 pm		at James Madison	L 44–64	8–7 (0–2)	JMU Convocation Center (2,303); Harrisonburg, VA
01/05/2017; 7:30 pm		at College of Charleston	L 57–62	8–8 (0–3)	TD Arena (3,296); Charleston, SC
01/07/2017; 7:00 pm		at Elon	L 61–72	8–9 (0–4)	Alumni Gym (884); Elon, NC
01/12/2017; 7:00 pm		Delaware	W 83–56	9–9 (1–4)	SECU Arena (1,812); Towson, MD
01/14/2017; 2:00 pm, CSN		Northeastern	W 74–67	10–9 (2–4)	SECU Arena (1,773); Towson, MD
01/19/2017; 7:00 pm		at Hofstra	W 86–80	11–9 (3–4)	Mack Sports Complex (1,331); Hempstead, NY
01/21/2017; 2:00 pm, CSN		at Delaware	W 75–58	12–9 (4–4)	Bob Carpenter Center (2,902); Newark, DE
01/26/2017; 7:00 pm		College of Charleston	W 83–77 ^{OT}	13–9 (5–4)	SECU Arena (2,076); Towson, MD
01/28/2017; 7:00 pm		at Northeastern	L 62–69	13–10 (5–5)	Matthews Arena (1,255); Boston, MA
02/02/2017; 7:00 pm		Drexel	W 104–103 ^{2OT}	14–10 (6–5)	SECU Arena (1,905); Towson, MD
02/04/2017; 4:00 pm, CSN		William & Mary	W 82–80	15–10 (7–5)	SECU Arena (3,431); Towson, MD
02/09/2017; 7:00 pm		Hofstra	W 69–65	16–10 (8–5)	SECU Arena (1,856); Towson, MD
02/11/2017; 4:00 pm		at Drexel	W 69–65	17–10 (9–5)	Daskalakis Athletic Center (1,009); Philadelphia, PA
02/16/2017; 7:00 pm		Elon	W 85–66	18–10 (10–5)	SECU Arena (1,931); Towson, MD
02/18/2017; 7:00 pm, CSN		James Madison	W 75–65	19–10 (11–5)	SECU Arena (2,871); Towson, MD
02/23/2017; 7:00 pm		at UNC Wilmington	L 78–83	19–11 (11–6)	Trask Coliseum (4,812); Wilmington, NC
02/25/2017; 2:00 pm, CSN		at William & Mary	L 79–83	19–12 (11–7)	Kaplan Arena (3,435); Williamsburg, VA
CAA tournament
03/04/2017; 8:30 pm, CSN	(3)	vs. (6) Northeastern; Quarterfinals	W 82–54	20–12	North Charleston Coliseum (4,212); North Charleston, SC
03/05/2017; 4:30 pm, CSN	(3)	vs. (2) College of Charleston; Quarterfinals	L 59–67	20–13	North Charleston Coliseum (4,708); North Charleston, SC
*Non-conference game. ^{#}Rankings from AP Poll. (#) Tournament seedings in parentheses. All times are in Eastern Time.

== See also ==
- 2016–17 Towson Tigers women's basketball team
