= 2016–17 Northeastern Huskies men's basketball team =

American college basketball season

2016–17 Northeastern Huskies men's basketball
- Conference: Colonial Athletic Association
- Record: 15–16 (8–10 CAA)
- Head coach: Bill Coen (11th season)
- Assistant coaches: Chris Markwood; Brian McDonald; Bobby Martin
- Home arena: Matthews Arena

2016–17 CAA men's basketball standings
	Conf.				Overall
Team	W		L	PCT	W		L	PCT
UNC Wilmington †	15	–	3	.833	29	–	6	.829
College of Charleston	14	–	4	.778	25	–	10	.714
Towson	11	–	7	.611	20	–	13	.606
Elon	10	–	8	.556	18	–	14	.563
William & Mary	10	–	8	.556	17	–	14	.548
Northeastern	8	–	10	.444	15	–	16	.484
Hofstra	7	–	11	.389	15	–	17	.469
James Madison	7	–	11	.389	10	–	23	.303
Delaware	5	–	13	.278	13	–	20	.394
Drexel	3	–	15	.167	9	–	23	.281
† 2017 CAA tournament winner

The 2016–17 Northeastern Huskies men's basketball team represented Northeastern University during the 2016–17 NCAA Division I men's basketball season. The Huskies, led by eleventh-year head coach Bill Coen, played their home games at Matthews Arena in Boston Massachusetts as members of the Colonial Athletic Association. They finished the season 15–16, 8–10 in CAA play to finish in sixth place. They lost in the quarterfinals of the CAA tournament to Towson.

== Previous season ==
The Huskies finished the 2015–16 season 18–15, 9–9 in CAA play to finish in sixth place. They defeated Towson to advance to the semifinals of the CAA tournament where they lost to UNC Wilmington.

== Departures ==
Name	Number	Pos.	Height	Weight	Year	Hometown	Notes
Brandon Kamga	0	G	6'5"	215	Freshman	Reston, VA	Transferred to High Point
David Walker	4	G	6'6"	196	Senior	Stow, OH	Graduated
Quincy Ford	12	G/F	6'8"	225	RS Senior	St. Petersburg, FL	Graduated
Caleb Donnelly	15	G	6'1"	181	RS Senior	Hudson, NH	Graduated
Zach Stahl	33	G	6'5"	215	Senior	Chanhasse, MN	Graduated
Kwesi Abakah	34	F	6'8"	212	RS Junior	Suwanee, GA	Graduate transferred to Richmond

=== Incoming transfers ===
Name	Number	Pos.	Height	Weight	Year	Hometown	Previous School
Alex Murphy	0	F	6'5"	225	RS Senior	Wakefield, RI	Transferred from Florida. Will eligible to play since Murphy graduated from Florida.
Vasa Pusica	4	G	6'5"	210	Junior	Belgrade, Serbia	Transferred from San Diego. Under NCAA transfer rules, Pusica will have to sit out for the 2016–17 season. Will have two years of remaining eligibility.

== Recruiting ==
College recruiting information
Name	Hometown	School	Height	Weight	Commit date
Bolden Brace #76 SF	Santa Barbara, CA	Santa Barbara High School	6 ft 5 in (1.96 m)	180 lb (82 kg)	Oct 22, 2015
Bolden Brace #76 SF	Recruit ratings: Scout: Rivals: (67)				
Maxime Boursiquot; SF	Ottawa, ON	Kent School	6 ft 5 in (1.96 m)	N/A	Mar 31, 2016
Maxime Boursiquot; SF	Recruit ratings: Scout: Rivals: (64)				
Shawn Occeus; SF	Boca Raton, FL	Grandview Prep	6 ft 5 in (1.96 m)	N/A	Oct 5, 2015
Shawn Occeus; SF	Recruit ratings: Scout: Rivals: (NR)				
Overall recruit ranking:
Note: In many cases, Scout, Rivals, 247Sports, On3, and ESPN may conflict in their listings of height and weight.; In these cases, the average was taken. ESPN grades are on a 100-point scale.; Sources: "2016 Team Ranking". Rivals.

== Roster ==
2016–17 Northeastern Huskies men's basketball team
Players
Coaches

Pos.	#	Name	Height	Weight	Year	Previous school	Hometown
F	0	Alex Murphy	6 ft 8 in (2.03 m)	225 lb (102 kg)	RS Sr	St. Mark's; Duke/Florida	Wakefield, RI
G	1	Shawn Occeus	6 ft 4 in (1.93 m)	195 lb (88 kg)	Fr	Grandview Prep	Boynton Beach, VA
F	2	Bolden Brace	6 ft 6 in (1.98 m)	221 lb (100 kg)	Fr	Santa Barbara	Santa Barbara, CA
G/F	3	Jimmy Marshall	6 ft 7 in (2.01 m)	210 lb (95 kg)	Sr	Douglas S. Freeman	Richmond, VA
G	4	Vasa Pusica (I) (redshirt)	6 ft 5 in (1.96 m)	210 lb (95 kg)	Jr	Sunrise Christian Academy; San Diego	Belgrade, Serbia
G	10	T. J. Williams	6 ft 3 in (1.91 m)	205 lb (93 kg)	Sr	Pflugerville	Pflugerville, TX
F	11	Jeremy Miller	6 ft 10 in (2.08 m)	230 lb (104 kg)	So	New Hampton School	Milton, MA
G/F	14	Maxime Boursiquot	6 ft 5 in (1.96 m)	211 lb (96 kg)	Fr	Immaculata/Kent School	Ottawa, ON
G	20	Devon Begley	6 ft 4 in (1.93 m)	198 lb (90 kg)	Jr	Pearland	Pearland, TX
F	21	Sajon Ford	6 ft 11 in (2.11 m)	210 lb (95 kg)	So	Gibbs	St. Petersburg, FL
G	22	Donnell Gresham, Jr.	6 ft 1 in (1.85 m)	197 lb (89 kg)	So	Cretin-Derham Hall	Maplewood, MN
C	30	Anthony Green	6 ft 10 in (2.08 m)	252 lb (114 kg)	So	Tilton School	Quincy, MA

Head coach

- Bill Coen (Hamilton College)

Assistant coach(es)

- Chris Markwood (Maine)
- Brian McDonald (Northeastern University)
- Bobby Martin (Pittsburgh)

Legend

- (C) Team captain
- (S) Suspended
- (I) Ineligible
- (W) Walk-on
- Injured
- Current redshirt

Roster

== Schedule and results ==
Date time, TV	Rank^{#}	Opponent^{#}	Result	Record	Site (attendance) city, state
Non-conference regular season
11/11/2016*; 7:00 pm, NESN		Boston University	W 87–77	1–0	Matthews Arena (2,287); Boston, MA
11/14/2016*; 7:00 pm, SNY		at UConn	W 64–61	2–0	Gampel Pavilion (7,573); Storrs, CT
11/18/2016*; 6:00 pm		at Boston University; Steve Wright Classic	L 63–65	2–1	Case Gym (843); Boston, MA
11/19/2016*; 6:30 pm		vs. LIU Brooklyn; Steve Wright Classic	L 74–78	2–2	Case Gym (672); Boston, MA
11/20/2016*; 2:00 pm		vs. Maine; Steve Wright Classic	W 80–72	3–2	Case Gym (460); Boston, MA
11/27/2016*; 2:00 pm		Kent State	W 73–70	4–2	Matthews Arena (701); Boston, MA
11/30/2016*; 7:00 pm		at Cornell	L 77–80	4–3	Newman Arena (742); Ithaca, NY
12/03/2016*; 6:00 pm		at Stony Brook	L 75–77	4–4	Island Federal Credit Union Arena (2,883); Stony Brook, NY
12/06/2016*; 7:00 pm		at Harvard	L 80–86	4–5	Lavietes Pavilion (1,517); Cambridge, MA
12/10/2016*; 1:00 pm		at Vermont	W 59–57	5–5	Patrick Gym (2,284); Burlington, VT
12/18/2016*; 7:00 pm, BTN		at Michigan State	W 81–73	6–5	Breslin Center (14,797); East Lansing, MI
12/20/2016*; 7:00 pm, ESPN3		at Oakland	W 61–59	7–5	Athletics Center O'rena (2,622); Rochester Hills, MI
CAA regular season
12/31/2016; 2:00 pm		William & Mary	W 84–64	8–5 (1–0)	Matthews Arena (960); Boston, MA
01/02/2017; 4:30 pm		at Drexel	W 75–70 ^{OT}	9–5 (2–0)	Daskalakis Athletic Center (899); Philadelphia, PA
01/05/2017; 7:00 pm, ASN		Delaware	W 90–54	10–5 (3–0)	Matthews Arena (1,873); Boston, MA
01/07/2017; 7:00 pm		James Madison	W 64–54	11–5 (4–0)	Matthews Arena (1,354); Boston, MA
01/12/2017; 7:00 pm		Drexel	W 92–75	12–5 (5–0)	Matthews Arena (1,417); Boston, MA
01/14/2017; 2:00 pm, CSN		at Towson	L 67–74	12–6 (5–1)	SECU Arena (1,773); Towson, MD
01/19/2017; 7:00 pm		at Delaware	L 62–69	12–7 (5–2)	Bob Carpenter Center (1,805); Newark, DE
01/21/2017; 4:00 pm		at Hofstra	L 73–78	12–8 (5–3)	Mack Sports Complex (2,629); Hempstead, NY
01/26/2017; 7:00 pm		Elon	L 49–51	12–9 (5–4)	Matthews Arena (1,249); Boston, MA
01/28/2017; 7:00 pm		Towson	W 69–62	13–9 (6–4)	Matthews Arena (1,255); Boston, MA
02/02/2017; 7:00 pm		at William & Mary	L 69–94	13–10 (6–5)	Kaplan Arena (2,134); Williamsburg, VA
02/04/2017; 4:00 pm		at James Madison	L 69–73	13–11 (6–6)	JMU Convocation Center (3,543); Harrisonburg, VA
02/09/2017; 7:30 pm		at College of Charleston	W 73–72	14–11 (7–6)	TD Arena (2,916); Charleston, SC
02/11/2017; 7:00 pm		Hofstra	L 64–74	14–12 (7–7)	Matthews Arena (1,032); Boston, MA
02/16/2017; 7:00 pm		UNC Wilmington	L 65–66	14–13 (7–8)	Matthews Arena (1,041); Boston, MA
02/18/2017; 1:00 pm		College of Charleston	L 71–85	14–14 (7–9)	Matthews Arena (1,447); Boston, MA
02/23/2017; 7:00 pm		at Elon	W 105–104 ^{2OT}	15–14 (8–9)	Alumni Gym (1,278); Elon, NC
02/25/2017; 2:00 pm		at UNC Wilmington	L 65–74	15–15 (8–10)	Trask Coliseum (5,200); Wilmington, NC
CAA tournament
03/04/2017; 8:30 pm, CSN	(6)	vs. (3) Towson; Quarterfinals	L 54–82	15–16	North Charleston Coliseum (4,212); North Charleston, SC
*Non-conference game. ^{#}Rankings from AP Poll. (#) Tournament seedings in parentheses. All times are in Eastern Time Source.

== See also ==
2016–17 Northeastern Huskies women's basketball team
