= 2016–17 Colonial Athletic Association men's basketball season =

- League: NCAA Division I
- Sport: Basketball
- Duration: November, 2016 – March, 2017
- Teams: 10

Regular Season
- Champions: UNC Wilmington
- Runners-up: College of Charleston
- Season MVP: T. J. Williams
- Top scorer: T. J. Williams (Northeastern)

Tournament
- Champions: UNC Wilmington
- Runners-up: College of Charleston
- Finals MVP: C. J. Bryce (UNC Wilmington)

CAA men's basketball seasons
- ← 2015–16 2017–18 →

2016–17 CAA men's basketball standings
	Conf.				Overall
Team	W		L	PCT	W		L	PCT
UNC Wilmington †	15	–	3	.833	29	–	6	.829
College of Charleston	14	–	4	.778	25	–	10	.714
Towson	11	–	7	.611	20	–	13	.606
Elon	10	–	8	.556	18	–	14	.563
William & Mary	10	–	8	.556	17	–	14	.548
Northeastern	8	–	10	.444	15	–	16	.484
Hofstra	7	–	11	.389	15	–	17	.469
James Madison	7	–	11	.389	10	–	23	.303
Delaware	5	–	13	.278	13	–	20	.394
Drexel	3	–	15	.167	9	–	23	.281
† 2017 CAA tournament winner

The 2016–17 CAA men's basketball season marked the 32nd season of Colonial Athletic Association basketball. The season began with practices in October 2016, followed by the start of the 2016–17 NCAA Division I men's basketball season in November. Conference play began in late December and concluded in late February.

On February 23, 2017, UNC Wilmington clinched the regular season CAA championship, their third consecutive CAA championship. The College of Charleston finished in second place.

The CAA tournament was held from March 3–6, 2017 at North Charleston Coliseum in North Charleston, South Carolina. UNC Wilmington defeated College of Charleston to win the tournament championship, their second consecutive tournament championship. As a result, UNC Wilmington received the conference's automatic bid to the NCAA tournament. College of Charleston received a bid to the National Invitation Tournament. Towson was invited to play in the College Basketball Invitational, but declined the invitation.

== Head coaches ==
=== Coaching changes ===
- On March 7, 2016, Bruiser Flint was fired as head basketball coach after 15 seasons with Drexel. On March 24, 2016, Drexel announced that Zach Spiker was hired to replace Bruiser Flint as head coach.
- James Madison, despite finishing with 21 wins, fired head coach Matt Brady on March 14, 2016. He was 139–127 in eight seasons with James Madison. On March 31, 2016, the school hired Louis Rowe, a JMU alum, as head coach.
- Delaware Head coach Monté Ross was fired following the season. On May 24, the school hired Martin Ingelsby as his replacement.

=== Coaches ===
Team	Head coach	Previous job	Year at school	Overall record	CAA record	CAA championships	NCAA Tournaments
College of Charleston	Earl Grant	Clemson (asst.)	3	51–48	25–29	0	0
Delaware	Martin Ingelsby	Notre Dame (asst.)	1	13–20	5–13	0	0
Drexel	Zach Spiker	Army	1	9–23	3–15	0	0
Elon	Matt Matheny	Davidson (asst.)	8	126–130	23–31	0	0
Hofstra	Joe Mihalich	Niagara	4	69–64	36–34	0	0
James Madison	Louis Rowe	Bowling Green (asst.)	1	10–23	7–11	0	0
Northeastern	Bill Coen	Boston College {asst.)	11	177–174	109–87	1	1
Towson	Pat Skerry	Pittsburgh (asst.)	6	98–101	54–52	0	0
UNC Wilmington	Kevin Keatts	Louisville (asst.)	3	72–28	41–13	2	2
William & Mary	Tony Shaver	Hampden-Sydney College	14	192–239	110–153	0	0

Notes:

- All records, appearances, titles, etc. are from time with current school only.
- Year at school includes 2016–17 season.
- Overall and CAA records are from time at current school and are through the end of the 2016–17 season.

== Preseason ==
=== Preseason poll ===
Rank	Team
1	UNC Wilmington (37)
2	Towson (2)
3	William & Mary (1)
4	College of Charleston
5	James Madison
6	Hofstra
7	Northeastern
8	Elon
9	Drexel
10	Delaware

() first place votes

=== Preseason Awards ===
Award	Recipients
Preseason Player of the Year	Chris Flemmings (UNC Wilmington)
Preseason All-CAA First Team	William Adala Moto (Towson); Jarrell Brantley (College of Charleston); Chris Flemmings (UNC Wilmington); Rokas Gustys (Hofstra); Omar Prewitt (William & Mary)
Preseason All-CAA Second Team	Shakir Brown (James Madison); Daniel Dixon (William & Mary); Denzel Ingram (UNC Wilmington); Cameron Johnson (College of Charleston); Mike Morsell (Towson)
Preseason All-CAA Honorable Mention	Brian Bernardi (Hofstra); C. J. Bryce (UNC Wilmington); Chivarsky Corbett (Delaware); Yohanny Dalembert (James Madison); Jeremy Miller (Northeastern); Tyler Seibring (Elon); Rodney Williams (Drexel)

Colonial Athletic Association Preseason Player of the Year: Chris Flemmings (UNC Wilmington)

== Regular season ==
=== Conference matrix ===
This table summarizes the head-to-head results between teams in conference play.

	College of Charleston	Delaware	Drexel	Elon	Hofstra	James Madison	Northeastern	Towson	UNC Wilmington	William & Mary
vs. College of Charleston	–	0–2	0–2	0–2	0–2	0–2	1–1	1–1	1–1	1–1
vs. Delaware	2–0	0–2	1–1	1–1	2–0	0–2	1–1	2–0	2–0	2–0
vs. Drexel	2–0	1–1	–	2–0	1–1	2–0	2–0	2–0	2–0	1–1
vs. Elon	2–0	1–1	0–2	–	0–2	1–1	1–1	1–1	1–1	1–1
vs. Hofstra	2–0	0–2	1–1	2–0	–	1–1	0–2	2–0	2–0	1–1
vs. James Madison	2–0	2–0	0–2	1–1	1–1	–	1–1	1–1	2–0	1–1
vs. Northeastern	1–1	1–1	0–2	1–1	2–0	1–1	–	1–1	2–0	1–1
vs. Towson	1–1	0–2	0–2	1–1	0–2	1–1	1–1	–	2–0	1–1
vs. UNC Wilmington	1–1	0–2	0–2	1–1	0–2	0–2	0–2	0–2	–	1–1
vs. William & Mary	1–1	0–2	1–1	1–1	1–1	1–1	1–1	1–1	1–1	–
Total	14–4	5–13	3–15	10–8	7–11	7–11	8–10	11–7	15–3	10–8

=== CAA Players of the Week ===
- Nov. 14 – T. J. Williams (Northeastern)
- Nov. 21 – Devontae Cacok (UNCW)
- Nov. 28 – Luke Eddy (Elon)
- Dec. 5 – Jarrell Brantley (Charleston), Brian Dawkins (Elon)
- Dec. 12 – Denzel Ingram (UNCW), Rodney Williams (Drexel)
- Dec. 19 – Alex Murphy (Northeastern)
- Dec. 26 – T. J. Williams (Northeastern) (2)
- Jan. 2 – Daniel Dixon (William & Mary)
- Jan. 9 – Joe Chealey (Charleston)
- Jan. 16 – William Adala Moto (Towson), Chris Flemmings (UNCW)
- Jan. 23 – Tyler Seibring (Elon), Justin Wright-Foreman (Hofstra)
- Jan. 30 – Omar Prewitt (William & Mary), Tyler Seibring (Elon) (2)
- Feb. 6 – Daniel Dixon (William & Mary) (2)
- Feb. 13 – Justin Wright-Foreman (Hofstra) (2)
- Feb. 20 – Mike Morsell (Towson)
- Feb. 27 – C. J. Bryce (UNCW)

=== CAA Rookies of the Week ===
- Nov. 14 – Eli Pemberton (Hofstra), Grant Riller (Charleston)
- Nov. 21 – Kurk Lee (Drexel)
- Nov. 28 – Max Boursiquot (Northeastern)
- Dec. 5 – Eli Pemberton (Hofstra)(2)
- Dec. 12 – Ryan Daly (Delaware)
- Dec. 19 – Eli Pemberton (Hofstra)(3)
- Dec. 26 – Kári Jónsson (Drexel)
- Jan. 2 – Ryan Daly (Delaware)(2)
- Jan. 9 – Ryan Daly (Delaware)(3)
- Jan. 16 – Grant Riller (Charleston)(2)
- Jan. 23 – Ryan Daly (Delaware)(4)
- Jan. 30 – Grant Riller (Charleston)(3)
- Feb. 6 – Bolden Brace (Northeastern), Kurk Lee (Drexel)(2)
- Feb. 13 – Ryan Daly (Delaware)(5), Grant Riller (Charleston)(4)
- Feb. 20 – Ryan Daly (Delaware)(6)
- Feb. 27 – Bolden Brace (Northeastern)(2)

== CAA honors and awards ==
Award	Recipients
Coach of the Year	Earl Grant (College of Charleston)
Player of the Year	T. J. Williams (Northeastern)
Defensive Player of the Year	Devontae Cacok (UNC Wilmington)
Rookie of the Year	Ryan Daly (Delaware)
Dean Ehlers Leadership Award	Evan Bailey (College of Charleston)
First Team	C. J. Bryce (UNC Wilmington); Joe Chealey (College of Charleston); Daniel Dixon (William & Mary); Chris Flemmings (UNC Wilmington); T. J. Williams (Northeastern)
Second Team	Jarrell Brantley (College of Charleston); Denzel Ingram (UNC Wilmington); Omar Prewitt (William & Mary); Tyler Seibring (Elon); Justin Wright-Foreman (Hofstra)
Third Team	Devontae Cacok (UNC Wilmington); Ryan Daly (Delaware); John Davis (Towson); Mike Morsell (Towson); Rodney Williams (Drexel)
All-Defensive Team	Devon Begley (Northeastern); Jarrell Brantley (College of Charleston); Devontae Cacok (UNC Wilmington); Cameron Johnson (College of Charleston); Deshaun Morman (Towson)
All-Rookie Team	Ryan Daly (Delaware); Nathan Knight (William & Mary); Kurk Lee (Drexel); Eli Pemberton (Hofstra); Grant Riller (College of Charleston)
All-Academic Team	William Adala Moto (Towson); Evan Bailey (College of Charleston); Dimitrije Cabarkapa (James Madison); Rokas Gustys (Hofstra); Curtis Lochner (Delaware); John Moran (Drexel); Ambrose Mosley (UNC Wilmington); Paul Rowley (William & Mary); Patrick Ryan (Elon); Hunter Sabety (Hofstra); Steven Santa Ana (Elon); Paulius Satkus (James Madison); Tyler Seibring (Elon); Dainan Swoope (Elon); Rodney Williams (Drexel)
All-Tournament Team	C. J. Bryce (UNC Wilmington); Jarrell Brantley (College of Charleston); Devontae Cacok (UNC Wilmington); Joe Chealey (College of Charleston); Ryan Daly (Delaware); Denzel Ingram (UNC Wilmington)
Tournament MVP	C. J. Bryce (UNC Wilmington)

== Postseason ==
=== Colonial Athletic Association Tournament ===
Session	Game	Time*	Matchup	Score	Attendance	Television
First round – Friday March 3, 2017						
1	1	6:00 PM	No. 9 Delaware vs No. 8 Hofstra	81–76	1,794	CAA.tv
1	2	8:30 PM	No. 10 Drexel vs No. 7 James Madison	70–80	1,889	CAA.tv
Quarterfinals – Saturday March 4, 2017						
2	3	12:00 PM	No. 9 Delaware vs No. 1 UNC Wilmington	82–91	4,217	Comcast SportsNet
2	4	2:30 PM	No. 5 Elon vs No. 4 William & Mary	66–71	4,096	Comcast SportsNet
3	5	6:00 PM	No. 7 James Madison vs No. 2 College of Charleston	62–67	4,212	Comcast SportsNet
3	6	8:30 PM	No. 6 Northeastern vs No. 3 Towson	54–82	4,143	Comcast SportsNet
Semifinals – Sunday March 5, 2017						
4	7	2:00 PM	No. 4 William & Mary vs No. 1 UNC Wilmington	94–105	4,389	Comcast SportsNet
4	8	4:30 PM	No. 3 Towson vs No. 2 College of Charleston	59–67	4,708	Comcast SportsNet
Championship – Monday March 6, 2017						
5	9	7:00 PM	No. 2 College of Charleston vs No. 1 UNC Wilmington	69–78	6,342	CBS Sports Network
*Game times in ET. Rankings denote tournament seed

=== NCAA tournament ===
The CAA had one bid to the 2017 NCAA Division I men's basketball tournament, that being the automatic bid of UNC Wilmington by winning the conference tournament.

Seed	Region	School	First Four	First round	Second round	Sweet 16	Elite Eight	Final Four	Championship
12	East	UNC Wilmington	N/A	Eliminated by (5) Virginia 71–76					
Bids		W-L (%):	0–0 (–)	0–1 (.000)	0–0 (–)	0–0 (–)	0–0 (–)	0–0 (–)	TOTAL: 0–1 (.000)

=== National Invitation Tournament ===
The College of Charleston was invited to play in the 2017 National Invitation Tournament.

Seed	School	First round	Second round	Quarterfinals	Semifinals	Championship
5	College of Charleston	Eliminated by Colorado State 74–81				
Bids	W-L (%):	0–1 (.000)	0–0 (–)	0–0 (–)	0–0 (–)	TOTAL: 0–1 (.000)
