= Matt Milon =

American basketball player (born 1996)

Free Agent
- Position: Shooting guard

Personal information
- Born: May 26, 1996 (age 30) Gainesville, Florida, U.S.
- Listed height: 6 ft 4 in (1.93 m)
- Listed weight: 196 lb (89 kg)

Career information
- High school: Oviedo (Oviedo, Florida)
- College: Boston College (2015–2016); William & Mary (2017–2019); UCF (2019–2020)
- NBA draft: 2020: undrafted
- Playing career: 2020–present

Career history
- 2020–2021: Starwings Basel
- 2021–2022: CS Phoenix Galați
- 2022–2023: Fribourg Olympic
- 2024–2025: GTK Gliwice

Matthew Richard Milon (born May 26, 1996) is an American professional basketball player who last played for GTK Gliwice of the Polish Basketball League (PLK). He played college basketball for Boston College, William & Mary and UCF.

== Early life and high school career ==
Milon was born in Gainesville, Florida and raised in Oviedo, Florida. He first began playing basketball in the third grade and his parents enrolled him in area city leagues. Milon attended Oviedo High School, where he was a four-year starter. As a junior, he averaged 18.0 points and 5.5 rebounds per game. He helped lead Oviedo to the FHSAA 7A state title in 2014, defeating Bartow High School 55-52. Milon was named the Florida Class 7A Player of the Year. As a senior, he averaged 23 points and 7 rebounds per game and helped Oviedo return to the title game. Milon was a finalist for Florida Mr. Basketball and was an All-State selection. He was regarded as a three-star prospect rated the No. 259 player in his class. Milon committed to Boston College over offers from Creighton, Florida State and Purdue.

== College career ==
Milon averaged 5.4 points and 1.4 rebounds per game as a freshman. He transferred to William & Mary and sat out a season as a redshirt. As a sophomore, Milon averaged 13 points, 2.7 rebounds and 1.1 assists per game while shooting 42.8 percent from three-point range. On November 16, 2018, he scored a career-high 30 points in a 100-95 loss to UIC. Milon averaged 13 points, 3.2 rebounds and 1.3 assists per game as a junior, while shooting 40.1 percent from three-point range. He earned a finance degree with a minor in data analytics from William & Mary. Following the season, Milon transferred to UCF as a graduate transfer, choosing the Knights over Virginia Tech and Ohio State. He averaged 6.2 points and 2.5 rebounds per game as a senior.

== Professional career ==
Milon signed his first professional contract with Starwings Basel of the Swiss Basketball League on August 29, 2020. He averaged 12.6 points, 2.6 rebounds, and 1.2 assists per game while shooting 37.9 percent from three-point range. Milon helped Starwings reach the league finals before falling to Fribourg Olympic Basket. On August 25, 2021, Milon signed with CS Phoenix Galați of the Liga Națională. He averaged 13.9 points, 3.6 rebounds, and 1.2 assists per game. In 2022, Milon signed with Fribourg Olympic of the Swiss league.

On October 30, 2023, Milon signed with Raptors 905, but was waived on November 9.

On June 26, 2024, he signed with GTK Gliwice of the Polish Basketball League (PLK).

== Personal life ==
Milon's parents, Abby and Wally Milon, are professors at UCF. Matt is the middle of three children.
