= 2016–17 UNC Wilmington Seahawks men's basketball team =

American college basketball season

2016–17 UNC Wilmington Seahawks men's basketball

CAA regular season and tournament champions

NCAA tournament, First Round
- Conference: Colonial Athletic Association
- Record: 29–6 (15–3 CAA)
- Head coach: Kevin Keatts (3rd season)
- Assistant coaches: Casey Stanley; Takayo Siddle; Thomas Carr
- Home arena: Trask Coliseum

2016–17 CAA men's basketball standings
	Conf.				Overall
Team	W		L	PCT	W		L	PCT
UNC Wilmington †	15	–	3	.833	29	–	6	.829
College of Charleston	14	–	4	.778	25	–	10	.714
Towson	11	–	7	.611	20	–	13	.606
Elon	10	–	8	.556	18	–	14	.563
William & Mary	10	–	8	.556	17	–	14	.548
Northeastern	8	–	10	.444	15	–	16	.484
Hofstra	7	–	11	.389	15	–	17	.469
James Madison	7	–	11	.389	10	–	23	.303
Delaware	5	–	13	.278	13	–	20	.394
Drexel	3	–	15	.167	9	–	23	.281
† 2017 CAA tournament winner

The 2016–17 UNC Wilmington Seahawks men's basketball team represented the University of North Carolina at Wilmington during the 2016–17 NCAA Division I men's basketball season. The Seahawks were led by third-year head coach Kevin Keatts and played their home games at the Trask Coliseum as members of the Colonial Athletic Association. They finished the season 29–6, 15–3 in CAA play to win the regular season championship, their third consecutive championship. They defeated Delaware, William & Mary, and the College of Charleston to win the CAA tournament. As a result, they earned the conference's automatic bid to the NCAA tournament for the second consecutive year. As the No. 12 seed in the East region, they lost in the first round to Virginia.

On March 17, 2017, head coach Kevin Keatts left the school to accept the head coaching position at NC State. On Apiril 3, the school hired longtime North Carolina assistant C.B. McGrath as head coach.

== Previous season ==
The Seahawks finished the 2015–16 season 25–8, 14–4 in CAA play to finish in a tie for the CAA regular season championship with Hofstra. They won the CAA tournament to earn the conference's automatic bid to the NCAA tournament where they lost in the first round to Duke.

== Offseason ==
=== Departures ===
Name	Number	Pos.	Height	Weight	Year	Hometown	Notes
Craig Ponder	0	G	6'1"	185	RS Senior	Bluefield, West Virginia	Graduated
Mark Matthews	2	G	6'6"	210	Freshman	Fort Myers, Florida	Transferred to USC Aiken
Trey Grundy	3	F	6'6"	210	Freshman	Lexington, Kentucky	Dismissed
Dylan Sherwood	20	F	6'9"	215	RS Senior	Pittsford, New York	Graduated
C. J. Getty	23	C	7'0"	275	RS Junior	Findlay, Ohio	Graduated; Transferred to Rutgers
Kevin Hickson	30	F	6'8"	215	Senior	Charlotte, North Carolina	Graduated

=== Incoming transfers ===
Name	Number	Pos.	Height	Weight	Year	Hometown	Previous School
Ambrose Mosley	00	G	6'2"	185	RS Senior	Jacksonville, Florida	Old Dominion
Tyrone Taylor		G	6'2"	155	Sophomore	Grandview, Missouri	Wichita State.

- Under NCAA transfer rules, Tyrone Taylor will sit out for the 2016–17 season, and will have three years of remaining eligibility entering the 2017–18 season.

=== Recruiting class of 2016 ===
College recruiting information
Name	Hometown	School	Height	Weight	Commit date
Jaylen Fornes; SG	Grantsboro, North Carolina	Word of God Christian Academy	6 ft 3 in (1.91 m)	170 lb (77 kg)	Sep 24, 2015
Jaylen Fornes; SG	Recruit ratings: Scout: Rivals: (NR)				
Matt Elmore; PF	Jacksonville, North Carolina	Dixon High School	6 ft 9 in (2.06 m)	235 lb (107 kg)	Oct 13, 2015
Matt Elmore; PF	Recruit ratings: Scout: Rivals: (NR)				
Overall recruit ranking:
Note: In many cases, Scout, Rivals, 247Sports, On3, and ESPN may conflict in their listings of height and weight.; In these cases, the average was taken. ESPN grades are on a 100-point scale.; Sources: "2016 Team Ranking". Rivals.

== Preseason ==
The Seahawks were picked to finish in first place in the conference's preseason poll. Chris Flemmings was named Preseason Player of the Year and Denzel Ingram was named to the CAA preseason second-team. C. J. Bryce was named an honorable mention.

== Roster ==
2016–17 UNC Wilmington Seahawks men's basketball team
Players
Coaches

Pos.	#	Name	Height	Weight	Year	Previous school	Hometown
G	00	Ambrose Mosley	6 ft 2 in (1.88 m)	185 lb (84 kg)	RS Sr	Hargrave Military Academy/Old Dominion	Jacksonville, Florida
G	1	Chris Flemmings	6 ft 5 in (1.96 m)	180 lb (82 kg)	RS Sr	Green Hope HS/Barton	Cary, North Carolina
G	2	JaQuel Richmond	6 ft 1 in (1.85 m)	180 lb (82 kg)	RS So	Wesleyan Christian Academy/Middle Tennessee	Greensboro, North Carolina
G	4	Jordan Talley	6 ft 0 in (1.83 m)	185 lb (84 kg)	Jr	Henrico HS	Richmond, Virginia
G	5	Jaylen Fornes	6 ft 3 in (1.91 m)	195 lb (88 kg)	Fr	Word of God Christian Academy	Grantsboro, North Carolina
G	10	Denzel Ingram	6 ft 0 in (1.83 m)	175 lb (79 kg)	RS Sr	Chapel Hill HS/Charlotte	Chapel Hill, North Carolina
G	12	C. J. Bryce	6 ft 5 in (1.96 m)	185 lb (84 kg)	So	North Mecklenburg HS	Huntersville, North Carolina
F	13	Chuck Ogbodo	6 ft 9 in (2.06 m)	225 lb (102 kg)	Sr	High Point Christian	Enugu, Nigeria
G	14	Nick Powell (W)	6 ft 4 in (1.93 m)	195 lb (88 kg)	So	Northwest Guilford HS	Greensboro, North Carolina
F	15	Devontae Cacok	6 ft 7 in (2.01 m)	240 lb (109 kg)	So	Alpharetta HS	Riverdale, Georgia
F	20	Matt Elmore	6 ft 9 in (2.06 m)	228 lb (103 kg)	Fr	Dixon HS	Jacksonville, North Carolina
F	21	Marcus Bryan	6 ft 7 in (2.01 m)	225 lb (102 kg)	RS Jr	Ravenscroft/Charlotte	Raleigh, North Carolina
G		Tyrone Taylor (I) (redshirt)	6 ft 1 in (1.85 m)	160 lb (73 kg)	So	Hargrave Military Academy/Wichita State	Grandview, Missouri

Head coach

- Kevin Keatts (Ferrum)

Assistant coach(es)

- Casey Stanley (Iona)
- Takayo Siddle (Gardner–Webb)
- Thomas Carr (Pfeiffer)

Legend

- (C) Team captain
- (S) Suspended
- (I) Ineligible
- (W) Walk-on
- Injured
- Current redshirt

Roster

== Schedule and results ==
Date time, TV	Rank^{#}	Opponent^{#}	Result	Record	High points	High rebounds	High assists	Site (attendance) city, state
Exhibition
Nov 6, 2016*; 2:00 pm		Mount Olive	W 117–65		19 – Bryce	11 – Cacok	8 – Ingram	Trask Coliseum (3,413); Wilmington, NC
Non-conference regular season
Nov 11, 2016*; 7:30 pm		Claflin	W 110–64	1–0	28 – Flemmings	16 – Cacok	9 – Ingram	Trask Coliseum (4,246); Wilmington, NC
Nov 14, 2016*; 7:00 pm		at Eastern Kentucky	W 78–69 ^{OT}	2–0	21 – Bryce	13 – Cacok	4 – Ingram	McBrayer Arena (1,850); Richmond, KY
Nov 20, 2016*; 3:00 pm		East Tennessee State	W 68–59	3–0	17 – Cacok	11 – Flemmings	6 – Ingram	Trask Coliseum (4,032); Wilmington, NC
Nov 25, 2016*; 8:30 pm		vs. Middle Tennessee; Challenge in Music City	L 63–68	3–1	19 – Ingram	10 – Cacok	4 – Bryce	Nashville Municipal Auditorium (1,200); Nashville, TN
Nov 26, 2016*; 6:00 pm		vs. Evansville; Challenge in Music City	W 65–62	4–1	18 – Flemmings	7 – Bryce	5 – Ingram	Nashville Municipal Auditorium (720); Nashville, TN
Nov 27, 2016*; 4:00 pm		vs. Toledo; Challenge in Music City	W 102–77	5–1	18 – Cacok	7 – Cacok	9 – Ingram	Nashville Municipal Auditorium (500); Nashville, TN
Nov 30, 2016*; 7:00 pm, ESPN3		at Western Michigan	W 97–92	6–1	18 – Bryce	8 – Bryce	6 – Ingram	University Arena (1,823); Kalamazoo, MI
Dec 3, 2016*; 1:00 pm		Pfeiffer	W 126–113	7–1	34 – Cacok	19 – Cacok	10 – Ingram	Trask Coliseum (3,731); Wilmington, NC
Dec 10, 2016*; 6:00 pm, ASN		at St. Bonaventure	W 81–80	8–1	19 – Ingram	9 – Cacok	5 – Ingram	Reilly Center (3,976); Olean, NY
Dec 14, 2016*; 7:00 pm		at Campbell	W 96–75	9–1	26 – Bryce	10 – Cacok	4 – Richmond	Gore Arena (1,827); Buies Creek, NC
Dec 17, 2016*; 2:00 pm		Radford	W 100–64	10–1	17 – Flemmings	9 – Cacok	7 – Ingram	Trask Coliseum (4,481); Wilmington, NC
Dec 20, 2016*; 6:30 pm		East Carolina	W 81–71	11–1	26 – Ingram	9 – Flemmings	3 – Ingram	Trask Coliseum (5,200); Wilmington, NC
Dec 28, 2016*; 7:00 pm, ACCN Extra		at Clemson	L 73–87	11–2	20 – Ingram	6 – Cacok	6 – Ingram	Littlejohn Coliseum (8,726); Clemson, SC
CAA regular season
Dec 31, 2016; Noon		at Towson	W 76–67	12–2 (1–0)	22 – Ingram	8 – Cacok	6 – Ingram	SECU Arena (1,795); Towson, MD
Jan 2, 2017; 7:00 pm		Elon	W 79–63	13–2 (2–0)	19 – Bryce	15 – Cacok	6 – Ingram	Trask Coliseum (4,350); Wilmington, NC
Jan 5, 2017; 7:00 pm		at Drexel	W 90–72	14–2 (3–0)	22 – Cacok	14 – Cacok	7 – Bryce	Daskalakis Athletic Center (508); Philadelphia, PA
Jan 7, 2017; 7:00 pm		at Delaware	W 91–81	15–2 (4–0)	27 – Bryce	10 – Cacok	8 – Ingram	Bob Carpenter Center (1,571); Newark, DE
Jan 12, 2017; 7:00 pm		William & Mary	W 101–77	16–2 (5–0)	18 – Bryce	13 – Cacok	6 – Bryce	Trask Coliseum (4,889); Wilmington, NC
Jan 14, 2017; 2:00 pm		Hofstra	W 84–76	17–2 (6–0)	20 – Ingram	10 – Bryce	5 – Ingram	Trask Coliseum (4,808); Wilmington, NC
Jan 19, 2017; 7:00 pm, ASN		at College of Charleston	W 65–59	18–2 (7–0)	17 – Talley	13 – Cacok	4 – Ingram	TD Arena (4,631); Charleston, SC
Jan 21, 2017; 4:00 pm, ASN		Drexel	W 87–74	19–2 (8–0)	17 – Flemmings	24 – Cacock	7 – Ingram	Trask Coliseum (5,200); Wilmington, NC
Jan 26, 2017; 7:00 pm		at James Madison	W 87–76	20–2 (9–0)	18 – Flemmings	10 – Cacok	7 – Talley	JMU Convocation Center (2,849); Harrisonburg, VA
Jan 28, 2017; 4:00 pm, CSN		at William & Mary	L 78–96	20–3 (9–1)	21 – Cacok	16 – Cacok	7 – Ingram	Kaplan Arena (3,239); Williamsburg, VA
Feb 2, 2017; 7:00 pm		College of Charleston	L 66–67	20–4 (9–2)	21 – Bryce	9 – Cacok	5 – Tied	Trask Coliseum (5,200); Wilmington, NC
Feb 4, 2017; 7:00 pm		Delaware	W 108–80	21–4 (10–2)	22 – Flemmings	6 – Tied	9 – Talley	Trask Coliseum (5,200); Wilmington, NC
Feb 9, 2017; 7:00 pm		James Madison	W 88–73	22–4 (11–2)	19 – Bryce	7 – Bryce	4 – Ingram	Trask Coliseum (4,439); Wilmington, NC
Feb 11, 2017; 4:00 pm, ASN		at Elon	L 76–77	22–5 (11–3)	20 – Talley	7 – Cacok	6 – Flemmings	Alumni Gym (1,738); Elon, NC
Feb 16, 2017; 7:00 pm		at Northeastern	W 66–65	23–5 (12–3)	21 – Flemmings	9 – Bryce	4 – Ingram	Matthews Arena (1,041); Boston, MA
Feb 18, 2017; 4:00 pm, ASN		at Hofstra	W 83–76	24–5 (13–3)	27 – Flemmings	7 – Bryce	4 – Tied	Mack Sports Complex (2,611); Hempstead, NY
Feb 23, 2017; 7:00 pm		Towson	W 83–78	25–5 (14–3)	28 – Bryce	10 – Cacok	5 – Ingram	Trask Coliseum (4,812); Wilmington, NC
Feb 25, 2017; 2:00 pm		Northeastern	W 74–65	26–5 (15–3)	23 – Bryce	9 – Cacok	5 – Ingram	Trask Coliseum (5,200); Wilmington, NC
CAA tournament
Mar 4, 2017; Noon, CSN	(1)	vs. (9) Delaware; Quarterfinals	W 91–82	27–5	17 – Bryce	6 – Mosley	8 – Ingram	North Charleston Coliseum (4,096); North Charleston, SC
Mar 5, 2017; 2:00 pm, CSN	(1)	vs. (4) William & Mary; Semifinals	W 105–94	28–5	26 – Flemmings	6 – Cacok	8 – Ingram	North Charleston Coliseum (4,708); North Charleston, SC
Mar 6, 2017; 7:00 pm, CBSSN	(1)	vs. (2) College of Charleston; Championship	W 78–69	29–5	24 – Bryce	14 – Cacok	5 – Bryce	North Charleston Coliseum (6,342); North Charleston, SC
NCAA tournament
Mar 16, 2017*; 12:40 pm, truTV	(12 E)	vs. (5 E) No. 24 Virginia; First Round	L 71–76	29–6	18 – Flemmings	15 – Cacok	5 – Talley	Amway Center (15,037); Orlando, FL
*Non-conference game. ^{#}Rankings from AP poll. (#) Tournament seedings in parentheses. E=East Region. All times are in Eastern Time. Source.

== Rankings ==
Ranking movements Legend: ██ Increase in ranking ██ Decrease in ranking — = Not ranked RV = Received votes
	Week																			
Poll	Pre	1	2	3	4	5	6	7	8	9	10	11	12	13	14	15	16	17	18	Final
AP	—	—	—	—	RV	—	—	RV	RV	RV	RV	RV	—	—	—	—	—	RV	—	Not released
Coaches	—	—	—	—	—	—	—	RV	RV	RV	RV	RV	RV	RV	—	—	—	RV	RV	—

*AP does not release post-NCAA Tournament rankings

== See also ==
2016–17 UNC Wilmington Seahawks women's basketball team
