= Devontae Cacok =

American basketball player (born 1996)

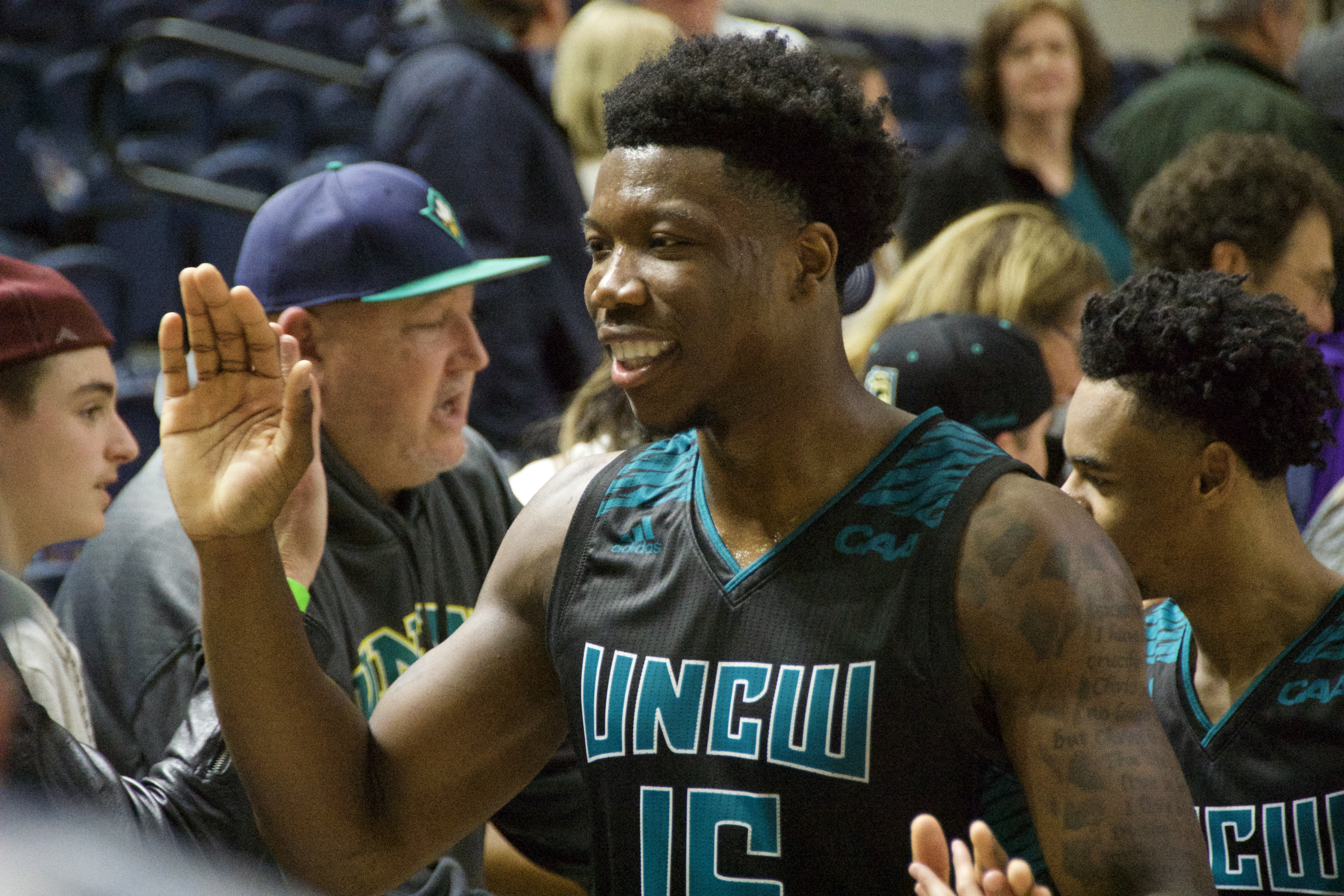
- Cacok with UNC Wilmington in 2019

No. 0 – Hapoel Jerusalem
- Position: Center
- League: Israeli Basketball Premier League; EuroCup

Personal information
- Born: October 8, 1996 (age 30) Chicago, Illinois, U.S.
- Listed height: 6 ft 8 in (2.03 m)
- Listed weight: 240 lb (109 kg)

Career information
- High school: Alpharetta (Alpharetta, Georgia)
- College: UNC Wilmington (2015–2019)
- NBA draft: 2019: undrafted
- Playing career: 2019–present

Career history
- 2019–2021: Los Angeles Lakers
- 2019–2020: →South Bay Lakers
- 2021–2022: San Antonio Spurs
- 2021–2022: →Austin Spurs
- 2022–2023: Motor City Cruise
- 2023: CSKA Moscow
- 2023–2024: Virtus Bologna
- 2025–2026: UCAM Murcia
- 2026–present: Hapoel Jerusalem

Career highlights
- NBA champion (2020); Italian Supercup winner (2023); All-NBA G League First Team (2020); NBA G League All-Rookie Team (2020); NCAA rebounding leader (2018); CAA Defensive Player of the Year (2017); 2× First-team All-CAA (2018, 2019); No. 15 retired by UNC Wilmington Seahawks
- Stats at NBA.com
- Stats at Basketball Reference

Devontae Calvin Cacok (/ˈkeɪˌkɒk/ KAY-kok; born October 8, 1996) is an American professional basketball player for Hapoel Jerusalem of the Israeli Basketball Premier League and the EuroCup. He played college basketball for the UNC Wilmington Seahawks. With them, in the 2016–17 season he led the nation in field goal percentage (80.0%) while setting a season-high NCAA single-season record, in the 2017–18 season he led the nation in rebounding, and in the 2018–19 season he led the nation in double-doubles.

== Early life ==
Cacok was born in Chicago, Illinois to a Haitian-American father Harry Cacok and Rose Lewis. He grew up in Riverdale, Georgia, playing football as a youth, mainly on the offensive line. He first began playing basketball in eight grade after he fractured his wrist, ending his football season. Cacok admits to having been terrible at first.

== High school ==
Cacok first attended Charles Drew High School in Riverdale, and then he and his family moved to Alpharetta, Georgia, and he joined the Alpharetta High School varsity basketball team after a seven-inch growth spurt as a sophomore. As a senior at the high school, he averaged 22 points and 12 rebounds per game, and led the team to a regional title.

== College career ==
Cacok attended University of North Carolina Wilmington for college, majoring in Communication Studies. As a freshman in 2015-16, he came off the bench in 29 games to average 9.1 minutes, 3.3 points, and 2.9 rebounds per game, while shooting 65.2% from the field.

As a sophomore in 2016-17, Cacok led the nation in field goal percentage (80.0%), setting a season-high NCAA single-season record, over six percentage points higher than the previous record. He accomplished this extremely high percentage by mainly shooting within a range of about two feet from the basket, and only taking one jump shot (a 15-footer, which he made) all year on the 29–6 Seahawks team. In 35 games he also averaged 25.9 minutes,12.3 points, 9.8 rebounds (2nd in the conference), 1.1 steals, and 1.3 blocks (3rd) per game. He had 40 blocks and tied for the league lead with 11 double-doubles. He established a CAA record with 24 rebounds against Drexel on January 21, 2017. He was named CAA Defensive Player of the Year, was selected to the Third Team All-CAA, was voted to the CAA All-Defense Team, and was voted All-CAA Tournament.

After the season, UNC Wilmington lost four starters and coach Kevin Keatts; new coach C. B. McGrath looked to expand his overall game. In an 87–63 win against Elon in February 2018, Cacok posted 17 points and 21 rebounds. The following matchup, an 88–64 loss to College of Charleston, he had 29 points and 17 rebounds. These two performances earned him CBS Sports Player of the Week honors.

As a junior, in 2017-18, in 32 games Cacok led NCAA Division I with 13.5 rebounds per game. He finished eighth in the CAA in scoring with 17.8 points per game, third in field goal percentage with 58.5% (leading the conference, for the second straight season), and had 1.0 steals per game. Cacok led the conference with 22 double-doubles, second-most of any player in the country. He tied the CAA record with 24 rebounds vs. JMU. He was named to the First Team All-CAA. The North Carolina Collegiate Sports Information Association named Cacok to the First Team All-State, he was named First-Team All-CAA, and he was named to the CAA All-Defensive Team for the second straight season.

Coming into his 2018-19 senior season, Cacok was named to the Preseason First Team All-CAA, Preseason First-Team Mid-Major All-American by NBC Sports, Preseason First-Team All-CAA by Athlon Sports, Preseason CAA Player-of-the-Year by Lindy's Sports College Basketball, Preseason First-Team All-CAA by Lindy's Sports College Basketball, and Preseason First-Team All-CAA by Street & Smith's College Basketball. As a senior, in 33 games Cacok averaged 28.8 minutes, 15.2 points, 12.3 rebounds (leading the conference, and 2nd in the NCAA), 0.9 steals, and 0.7 blocks (8th) per game. He led the nation in double-doubles with 22, while shooting 59.0% from the floor (leading the conference for the third straight season). He was again selected to the First Team All-CAA, and named to the CAA All-Defense Team. He became the first player in NCAA Division I history to lead the country in three different statistical categories in three separate season--field goal percentage in 2016-17 (.800), rebounding per game in 2017-18 (13.5), and double-doubles in 2018-19 (22).

Cacok leads the conference in career field goal percentage (.639; 18th in the NCAA) and offensive rebounds (450), is 2nd in defensive rebounds (812), 3rd in total rebounds (1,262), and 4th in rebounds per game (9.8). Asked about his statistics, he said:

"I try to not let the statistics and stuff like that get to my head because at the end of the day, they’re just numbers, That’s all they really are. I try to have my head on my shoulders and stay focused on helping my team and helping other people. I get more enjoyment in doing that than just looking at stats and thinking that ‘yeah, I did that!’ or ‘I’m Devontae Cacok, I can do this!’ I’m not that type of person."

UNCW retired his jersey in 2022.

== Professional career ==
=== Los Angeles Lakers (2019–2021) ===
After going undrafted in the 2019 NBA draft, Cacok signed an Exhibit 10 contract with the Los Angeles Lakers to play in the 2019 NBA Summer League. On October 21, 2019, Cacok was waived by the Lakers. He was then added to the roster of the South Bay Lakers of the NBA G League.

On December 11, 2019, Cacok signed a two-way contract with the Los Angeles Lakers, under which he would split time between South Bay and LA. On December 28, 2019, playing for South Bay, Cacok grabbed a career-high 19 rebounds to go along with 22 points in a 124–120 win over the Northern Arizona Suns. He suffered a stress reaction in his left foot on January 13, 2020, sidelining him for several weeks. Cacok returned to action on February 1, contributing 13 points and seven rebounds in a win over the Rio Grande Valley Vipers. For the season with South Bay, Cacok averaged 23.9 minutes, 19.4 points, 11.9 rebounds (3rd in the league), 0.8 assists, and 1.1 steals per game, while shooting 56.1% from the floor. He was named to the All-NBA G League First Team, and to the League's All-Rookie Team.

On August 13, 2020, he made his NBA debut for the Lakers, scoring six points on 3-of-6 shooting and grabbing five rebounds in 8.9 minutes in a 136–122 loss to the Sacramento Kings, in his only NBA game for the season. He won the 2020 NBA championship with the Lakers, becoming the first UNCW alumni to win an NBA championship.

In 2020-21 with the Lakers, Cacok played 20 games, in which he averaged 4.9 minutes, 1.9 points, and 1.6 rebounds per game while shooting 58.6% from the floor.

On September 20, 2021, Cacok signed with the Brooklyn Nets. He was waived at the end of training camp, after playing in two preseason games, on October 16.

=== San Antonio Spurs (2021–2022) ===
On October 18, the San Antonio Spurs claimed Cacok off waivers and converted his deal into a two-way contract with the Austin Spurs. On March 4, 2022, the San Antonio Spurs converted Cacok's contract into a standard deal. With the Austin Spurs, in 37 games in 2021–22 he averaged 29.5 minutes, 18.7 points, 11.8 rebounds (2nd in the league), 2.2 assists, and 1.3 steals per game while shooting 56.1% from the floor. With the San Antonio Spurs in 2021–22 in 15 games he averaged 8.1 minutes, 3.1 points, and 2.8 rebounds per game while shooting 67.7% from the floor.

=== Motor City Cruise (2022–2023) ===
On September 7, 2022, the Portland Trail Blazers announced that they had signed Cacok. After playing with the team in one preseason game, he was waived on October 7.

On November 3, 2022, Cacok was named to the opening night roster for the Motor City Cruise. In 28 games he averaged 29.6 minutes, 18.6 points, 9.7 rebounds (3rd in the league), 1.5 assists, and 1.0 steals per game while shooting 61.1% from the floor.

=== CSKA Moscow (2023) ===
On February 11, 2023, Cacok signed with CSKA Moscow of the VTB United League. In 20 games he averaged 17.4 minutes, 9.6 points, 5.5 rebounds, 0.9 assists, and 0.8 steals per game while shooting 71.3% from the floor.

=== Virtus Bologna (2023–2024) ===
On July 10, 2023, Cacok signed a two-year deal with Virtus Segafredo Bologna of the Lega Basket Serie A (LBA) and the EuroLeague. On September 24, 2023, after having ousted Olimpia Milano in the semifinals, Virtus won its fourth Supercup, and the third in a row, defeating Germani Brescia 97–60. Cacok suffered a season-ending right knee injury in December 2023 in a EuroLeague game against Partizan. Due to an operation followed by a prolonged recovery period, on November 14, 2024, Cacok was released from the Italian club. In 27 games he averaged 11.0 minutes, 3.6 points, and 2.9 rebounds per game while shooting 58.8% from the floor.

=== UCAM Murcia (2025–2026) ===
On August 8, 2025, Cacok signed with UCAM Murcia CB of the Liga ACB in Spain. In 50 games he averaged 17.8 minutes, 11.6 points, 5.4 rebounds, and 1.0 assists per game while shooting 66.1% from the floor.

=== Hapoel Jerusalem (2026–present) ===
On July 10, 2026, Cacok signed with Hapoel Jerusalem of the Israeli Basketball Premier League.

== Career statistics ==
Legend
GP	Games played	GS	Games started	MPG	Minutes per game
FG%	Field goal percentage	3P%	3-point field goal percentage	FT%	Free throw percentage
RPG	Rebounds per game	APG	Assists per game	SPG	Steals per game
BPG	Blocks per game	PPG	Points per game	**Bold**	Career high
†	Won an NBA championship

=== NBA ===
==== Regular season ====
Year	Team	GP	GS	MPG	FG%	3P%	FT%	RPG	APG	SPG	BPG	PPG
2019–20†	L.A. Lakers	1	0	**9.0**	.500	—	—	**5.0**	**1.0**	.0	.0	**6.0**
2020–21	L.A. Lakers	**20**	**1**	4.0	.586	—	.455	1.6	.1	.3	.2	2.0
2021–22	San Antonio	15	0	8.1	**.677**	—	**.571**	2.8	.4	**.5**	**.5**	3.1
Career		36	1	6.3	.621	—	.500	2.2	.2	.4	.3	2.5

=== EuroLeague ===
Year	Team	GP	GS	MPG	FG%	3P%	FT%	RPG	APG	SPG	BPG	PPG	PIR
2023–24	Bologna	15	1	9.1	.714	—	.667	2.3	.5	.3	.1	3.2	4.0
Career		15	1	9.1	.714	—	.667	2.3	.5	.3	.1	3.2	4.0

=== College ===
Year	Team	GP	GS	MPG	FG%	3P%	FT%	RPG	APG	SPG	BPG	PPG
2015–16	UNCW	29	4	9.1	.652	–	.407	2.9	.1	.4	.2	3.3
2016–17	UNCW	**35**	**33**	25.9	**.800**	–	.589	9.8	.4	**1.1**	**1.3**	12.3
2017–18	UNCW	32	29	**29.4**	.585	–	**.612**	**13.5**	**.9**	1.0	.6	**17.7**
2018–19	UNCW	33	31	28.8	.590	**1.000**	.600	12.3	.6	.9	.7	15.2
Career		129	97	23.8	.639	1.000	.592	9.8	.5	.9	.7	12.3
