= 2016–17 Delaware Fightin' Blue Hens men's basketball team =

American college basketball season

2016–17 Delaware Fightin' Blue Hens men's basketball
- Conference: Colonial Athletic Association
- Record: 13–20 (5–13 CAA)
- Head coach: Martin Ingelsby (1st season)
- Assistant coaches: Bill Phillips; Corey McCrae; Torrian Jones
- Home arena: Bob Carpenter Center

2016–17 CAA men's basketball standings
	Conf.				Overall
Team	W		L	PCT	W		L	PCT
UNC Wilmington †	15	–	3	.833	29	–	6	.829
College of Charleston	14	–	4	.778	25	–	10	.714
Towson	11	–	7	.611	20	–	13	.606
Elon	10	–	8	.556	18	–	14	.563
William & Mary	10	–	8	.556	17	–	14	.548
Northeastern	8	–	10	.444	15	–	16	.484
Hofstra	7	–	11	.389	15	–	17	.469
James Madison	7	–	11	.389	10	–	23	.303
Delaware	5	–	13	.278	13	–	20	.394
Drexel	3	–	15	.167	9	–	23	.281
† 2017 CAA tournament winner

The 2016–17 Delaware Fightin' Blue Hens men's basketball team represented the University of Delaware during the 2016–17 NCAA Division I men's basketball season. The Fightin' Blue Hens, led by first-year head coach Martin Ingelsby, played their home games at the Bob Carpenter Center in Newark, Delaware as members of the Colonial Athletic Association. They finished the season 13–20, 5–13 in CAA play to finish in ninth place. They defeated Hofstra in the first round of the CAA tournament to advance to the quarterfinals where they lost to UNC Wilmington.

== Previous season ==
The Fightin' Blue Hens finished the 2015–16 season 7–23, 2–16 in CAA play to finish in last place. They lost in the first round of the CAA tournament to College of Charleston.

Head coach Monté Ross was fired following the season. The school hired Martin Ingelsby as his replacement.

== Departures ==
Name	Number	Pos.	Height	Weight	Year	Hometown	Notes
Korey Holden	1	G	6'2"	180	Sophomore	Salisbury, MD	Transferred to South Carolina
Tyler Burns	14	G	5'10"	155	Sophomore	Wilmington, DE	Dismissed from team
Maurice Jeffers	15	F	6'9"	240	RS Junior	Washington D.C.	Transferred to Boston College
Marvin King-Davis	21	F	6'7"	230	RS Senior	Richmond, VA	Graduated
Sean Locke	24	G	6'4"	195	Senior	Newark, DE	Graduated

=== Incoming transfers ===
Name	Number	Pos.	Height	Weight	Year	Hometown	Previous School
Derrick Woods	20	F	6'8"	215	Sophomore	Trenton, NJ	St. Bonaventure

- Under NCAA transfer rules, Woods will sit out the 2016–17 season, and will have three years of remaining eligibility entering the 2017–18 season.

== Recruiting ==
College recruiting information
Name	Hometown	School	Height	Weight	Commit date
Ryan Daly; SF	Havertown, PA	Archbishop Carroll High School	6 ft 4 in (1.93 m)	185 lb (84 kg)	
Ryan Daly; SF	Recruit ratings: (59)				
Jacob Cushing; PF	Naperville, IL	Neuqua Valley High School	6 ft 8 in (2.03 m)	175 lb (79 kg)	Aug 3, 2016
Jacob Cushing; PF	Recruit ratings: Rivals:				
Overall recruit ranking:
Note: In many cases, Scout, Rivals, 247Sports, On3, and ESPN may conflict in their listings of height and weight.; In these cases, the average was taken. ESPN grades are on a 100-point scale.; Sources: "2016 Team Ranking". Rivals.

== Roster ==
2016–17 Delaware Fightin' Blue Hens men's basketball team
Players
Coaches

Pos.	#	Name	Height	Weight	Year	Previous school	Hometown
G	0	Ryan Daly	6 ft 4 in (1.93 m)	185 lb (84 kg)	Fr	Archbishop John Carroll High School	Ardmore, Pennsylvania
G/F	1	Chivarsky Corbett	6 ft 7 in (2.01 m)	195 lb (88 kg)	RS So	Tampa Catholic High School	Tampa, Florida
F	2	Barnett Harris	6 ft 9 in (2.06 m)	215 lb (98 kg)	Sr	Fishburne Military School	Monroeville, Pennsylvania
G	3	Anthony Mosley	6 ft 1 in (1.85 m)	180 lb (82 kg)	Jr	Sanford School	Wilmington, Delaware
G	4	Darian Bryant	6 ft 4 in (1.93 m)	200 lb (91 kg)	RS So	George Washington	Bowie, Maryland
F	5	Eric Carter	6 ft 9 in (2.06 m)	225 lb (102 kg)	RS So	Jackson Memorial High School	Jackson, New Jersey
G	10	Curtis McRoy	6 ft 2 in (1.88 m)	170 lb (77 kg)	Sr	Archbishop Spalding High School	Annapolis, Maryland
G/F	11	Devonne Pinkard	6 ft 6 in (1.98 m)	200 lb (91 kg)	Sr	J. P. McCaskey High School	Lancaster, Pennsylvania
F	20	Derrick Woods (I) (redshirt)	6 ft 8 in (2.03 m)	225 lb (102 kg)	So	St. Bonaventure	Trenton, New Jersey
G	22	Cazmon Hayes	6 ft 4 in (1.93 m)	195 lb (88 kg)	Sr	Phillip O. Berry Academy of Technology	Charlotte, North Carolina
F	23	Skye Johnson	6 ft 8 in (2.03 m)	240 lb (109 kg)	Jr	Virginia Episcopal School	Dumfries, Virginia
G	25	Curtis Lochner (W)	5 ft 10 in (1.78 m)	175 lb (79 kg)	So	Abington Senior High School	Willow Grove, Pennsylvania
F	35	Jacob Cushing	6 ft 8 in (2.03 m)	210 lb (95 kg)	Fr	Neuqua Valley High School	Naperville, Illinois

Head coach

- Martin Ingelsby (Notre Dame)

Assistant coach(es)

- Bill Phillips (St. Joseph's)
- Corey McCrae (Fordham)
- Torrian Jones (Notre Dame)

Legend

- (C) Team captain
- (S) Suspended
- (I) Ineligible
- (W) Walk-on
- Injured
- Current redshirt

Roster

== Schedule and results ==
Date time, TV	Rank^{#}	Opponent^{#}	Result	Record	Site (attendance) city, state
Non-conference regular season
November 11, 2016*; 7:00 pm		Goldey-Beacom; Tarkett Sports Classic	W 64–56	1–0	Bob Carpenter Center (2,277); Newark, DE
November 13, 2016*; 5:00 pm		at Bradley	W 63–49	2–0	Carver Arena (4,897); Peoria, IL
November 15, 2016*; 7:00 pm		at La Salle	L 68–74	2–1	Tom Gola Arena (1,888); Philadelphia, PA
November 18, 2016*; 7:00 pm		at Miami (OH); Tarkett Sports Classic	W 68–66	3–1	Millett Hall (1,317); Oxford, OH
November 19, 2016*; 1:30 pm		vs. Northern Kentucky; Tarkett Sports Classic	L 53–74	3–2	Millett Hall (1,274); Oxford, OH
November 20, 2016*; 12:00 pm		vs. Austin Peay; Tarkett Sports Classic	L 75–76	3–3	Millett Hall (1,229); Oxford, OH
November 27, 2016*; 2:00 pm		Bryn Athyn	W 84–51	4–3	Bob Carpenter Center (1,275); Newark, DE
December 2, 2016*; 7:00 pm		Delaware State	W 64–49	5–3	Bob Carpenter Center (2,492); Newark, DE
December 11, 2016*; 2:00 pm		at Yale	L 63–81	5–4	John L. Lee Amphitheater (1,014); New Haven, CT
December 17, 2016*; 6:00 pm, FSN/YES		at Seton Hall	L 68–81	5–5	Prudential Center (7,662); Newark, NJ
December 20, 2016*; 7:00 pm		Marist	W 59–56	6–5	Bob Carpenter Center (1,885); Newark, DE
December 22, 2016*; 7:00 pm, ESPN3		at South Florida	L 53–81	6–6	USF Sun Dome (2,398); Tampa, FL
December 28, 2016*; 7:00 pm		Iona	W 63–54	7–6	Bob Carpenter Center (1,776); Newark, DE
CAA regular season
December 31, 2016; 7:00 pm		Hofstra	L 56–58	7–7 (0–1)	Bob Carpenter Center (1,589); Newark, DE
January 2, 2017; 2:00 pm		College of Charleston	L 56–65	7–8 (0–2)	Bob Carpenter Center (2,619); Newark, DE
January 5, 2017; 7:00 pm, ASN		at Northeastern	L 54–90	7–9 (0–3)	Matthews Arena (1,873); Boston, MA
January 7, 2017; 7:00 pm		UNC Wilmington	L 81–91	7–10 (0–4)	Bob Carpenter Center (1,571); Newark, DE
January 12, 2017; 7:00 pm		at Towson	L 56–83	7–11 (0–5)	SECU Arena (1,812); Towson, MD
January 14, 2017; 4:00 pm		at Drexel	L 60–76	7–12 (0–6)	Daskalakis Athletic Center (1,788); Philadelphia, PA
January 19, 2017; 7:00 pm		Northeastern	W 69–62	8–12 (1–6)	Bob Carpenter Center (1,805); Newark, DE
January 21, 2017; 2:00 pm, CSN		Towson	L 58–75	8–13 (1–7)	Bob Carpenter Center (2,902); Newark, DE
January 26, 2017; 7:00 pm		at William & Mary	L 58–82	8–14 (1–8)	Kaplan Arena (2,276); Williamsburg, VA
January 28, 2017; 7:00 pm		James Madison	W 66–61	9–14 (2–8)	Bob Carpenter Center (2,628); Newark, DE
February 2, 2017; 7:00 pm		at Hofstra	L 65–73	9–15 (2–9)	Mack Sports Complex (1,142); Hempstead, NY
February 4, 2017; 7:00 pm		at UNC Wilmington	L 80–108	9–16 (2–10)	Trask Coliseum (5,200); Wilmington, NC
February 9, 2017; 7:00 pm		Elon	W 76–74 ^{OT}	10–16 (3–10)	Bob Carpenter Center (1,784); Newark, DE
February 11, 2017; 4:00 pm		at James Madison	W 58–57	11–16 (4–10)	JMU Convocation Center (2,883); Harrisonburg, VA
February 16, 2017; 7:00 pm		Drexel	W 68–67	12–16 (5–10)	Bob Carpenter Center (2,248); Newark, DE
February 18, 2017; 7:00 pm		William & Mary	L 64–85	12–17 (5–11)	Bob Carpenter Center (3,619); Newark, DE
February 23, 2017; 7:30 pm		at College of Charleston	L 65–78	12–18 (5–12)	TD Arena (3,384); Charleston, SC
February 25, 2017; 7:00 pm		at Elon	L 59–81	12–19 (5–13)	Alumni Gym (1,607); Elon, NC
CAA tournament
March 3, 2017; 6:00 pm	(8)	vs. (9) Hofstra; First round	W 81–76	13–19	North Charleston Coliseum (1,889); North Charleston, SC
March 4, 2017; 12:00 pm, CSN	(8)	vs. (1) UNC Wilmington; Quarterfinals	L 82–91	13–20	North Charleston Coliseum (4,096); North Charleston, SC
*Non-conference game. ^{#}Rankings from AP Poll. (#) Tournament seedings in parentheses. All times are in Eastern Time.

== See also ==
2016–17 Delaware Fightin' Blue Hens women's basketball team
