= 2017 CAA men's basketball tournament =

- Tournament Logo
- Classification: Division I
- Season: 2016–17
- Teams: 10
- Site: North Charleston Coliseum; North Charleston, SC
- Champions: UNC Wilmington (6th title)
- Winning coach: Kevin Keatts (2nd title)
- MVP: C. J. Bryce (UNC Wilmington)
- Attendance: 21,247
- Television: CAA.tv, CSN CBSSN

2016–17 CAA men's basketball standings
| | Conf. | | | | Overall |
| Team | W | | L | PCT | W | | L | PCT |
|---|---|---|---|---|---|---|---|---|
| UNC Wilmington † | 15 | – | 3 | .833 | 29 | – | 6 | .829 |
| College of Charleston | 14 | – | 4 | .778 | 25 | – | 10 | .714 |
| Towson | 11 | – | 7 | .611 | 20 | – | 13 | .606 |
| Elon | 10 | – | 8 | .556 | 18 | – | 14 | .563 |
| William & Mary | 10 | – | 8 | .556 | 17 | – | 14 | .548 |
| Northeastern | 8 | – | 10 | .444 | 15 | – | 16 | .484 |
| Hofstra | 7 | – | 11 | .389 | 15 | – | 17 | .469 |
| James Madison | 7 | – | 11 | .389 | 10 | – | 23 | .303 |
| Delaware | 5 | – | 13 | .278 | 13 | – | 20 | .394 |
| Drexel | 3 | – | 15 | .167 | 9 | – | 23 | .281 |
† 2017 CAA tournament winner

The 2017 Colonial Athletic Association men's basketball tournament was held March 3–6, 2017 at North Charleston Coliseum in North Charleston, South Carolina. The champion, UNC Wilmington, received an automatic bid to the 2017 NCAA tournament with a 78–69 win over Charleston.

== Seeds ==
All 10 CAA teams participated in the tournament. Teams were seeded by conference record, with a tiebreaker system used to seed teams with identical conference records. The top six teams received a bye to the quarterfinals.

| Seed | School | Conference | Tiebreaker 1 | Tiebreaker 2 |
|---|---|---|---|---|
| 1 | UNC Wilmington | 15–3 | | |
| 2 | College of Charleston | 14–4 | | |
| 3 | Towson | 11–7 | | |
| 4 | William & Mary | 10–8 | 1–1 vs. Elon | 1–1 vs. UNCW, 1–1 vs. Charl. |
| 5 | Elon | 10–8 | 1–1 vs W&M | 1–1 vs. UNCW, 0–2 vs. Charl. |
| 6 | Northeastern | 8–10 | | |
| 7 | James Madison | 7–11 | 1–1 vs. Hofstra | 0–2 vs UNCW, 0–2 vs. Charl., 1–1 vs. TU |
| 8 | Hofstra | 7–11 | 1–1 vs. JMU | 0–2 vs UNCW, 0–2 vs. Charl., 0–2 vs. TU |
| 9 | Delaware | 5–13 | | |
| 10 | Drexel | 3–15 | | |

== Schedule ==
| Session | Game | Time* | Matchup | Score | Attendance | Television |
| First round – Friday March 3, 2017 | | | | | | |
|---|---|---|---|---|---|---|
| 1 | 1 | 6:00 PM | No. 9 Delaware vs No. 8 Hofstra | 81–76 | 1,794 | CAA.tv |
| 1 | 2 | 8:30 PM | No. 10 Drexel vs No. 7 James Madison | 70–80 | 1,889 | CAA.tv |
| Quarterfinals – Saturday March 4, 2017 | | | | | | |
| 2 | 3 | 12:00 PM | No. 9 Delaware vs No. 1 UNC Wilmington | 82–91 | 4,217 | Comcast SportsNet |
| 2 | 4 | 2:30 PM | No. 5 Elon vs No. 4 William & Mary | 66–71 | 4,096 | Comcast SportsNet |
| 3 | 5 | 6:00 PM | No. 7 James Madison vs No. 2 College of Charleston | 62–67 | 4,212 | Comcast SportsNet |
| 3 | 6 | 8:30 PM | No. 6 Northeastern vs No. 3 Towson | 54–82 | 4,143 | Comcast SportsNet |
| Semifinals – Sunday March 5, 2017 | | | | | | |
| 4 | 7 | 2:00 PM | No. 4 William & Mary vs No. 1 UNC Wilmington | 94–105 | 4,389 | Comcast SportsNet |
| 4 | 8 | 4:30 PM | No. 3 Towson vs No. 2 College of Charleston | 59–67 | 4,708 | Comcast SportsNet |
| Championship – Monday March 6, 2017 | | | | | | |
| 5 | 9 | 7:00 PM | No. 2 College of Charleston vs No. 1 UNC Wilmington | 69–78 | 6,342 | CBS Sports Network |
*Game times in ET. Rankings denote tournament seed

== Bracket ==
First round Friday, March 3 CAA.tv
8 | Hofstra | 76
9 | Delaware | 81
7 | James Madison | 80
10 | Drexel | 70

Quarterfinals; Saturday, March 4 Comcast SportsNet
1 | UNC Wilmington | 91
9 | Delaware | 82
4 | William & Mary | 71
5 | Elon | 66
2 | College of Charleston | 67
7 | James Madison | 62
3 | Towson | 82
6 | Northeastern | 54

Semifinals; Sunday, March 5 Comcast SportsNet
1 | UNC Wilmington | 105
4 | William & Mary | 94
2 | College of Charleston | 67
3 | Towson | 59

Final; Monday, March 6 CBS Sports Network
1 | UNC Wilmington | 78
2 | College of Charleston | 69

== Game summaries ==
=== First round ===
CAA.tv

March 3, 2017
6:00 pm

#9 Delaware 81, #8 Hofstra 76
Scoring by half: 39–47, 42–29
| Pts: R. Daly – 27; Rebs: R. Daly – 11; Asts: R. Daly – 6 E. Carter – 19 Pts, 10 Rebs | Pts: J. Wright-Foreman – 23; Rebs: R. Gustys – 9 Asts: 3 Tied – 3 R. Gustys – 2 Stls |

North Charleston Coliseum
North Charleston, SC
Referees: D. Gladden, M. Potter, L. Andrakakos

CAA.tv

March 3, 2017
8:30 pm

#10 Drexel 70, #7 James Madison 80
Scoring by half: 33–25, 37–55
| Pts: S. Mojica – 15; Rebs: R. Williams – 7 Asts: K. Lee – 7 S. Mojica – 3 Stls | Pts: J. Kent – 20; Rebs: S. Brown – 9 Asts: S. Brown – 4 J. McLean – 14 Pts |

North Charleston Coliseum
North Charleston, SC
Attendance: 1,889
Referees: W. Humes, J. Hartness, A.J. Desai

=== Quarterfinals ===
Comcast SportsNet

March 4, 2017
12:00 pm

#9 Delaware 82, #1 UNC Wilmington 91
Scoring by half: 32–41, 50–50
| Pts: R. Daly – 24; Rebs: R. Daly – 10; Asts: D. Bryant – 4 An. Mosley – 20 Pts | Pts: C.J. Bryce – 17; Rebs: Am. Mosley – 6 Asts: D. Ingram – 8 D. Ingram – 15 Pts |

North Charleston Coliseum
North Charleston, SC
Referees: T. Ebersole, J. Page, T. Crisp

Comcast SportsNet

March 4, 2017
2:30 pm

#5 Elon 66, #4 William & Mary 71
Scoring by half: 33–30, 33–41
| Pts: B. Dawkins – 19; Rebs: B. Dawkins – 9 Asts: D. Swoope – 4 T. Seibring – 14 Pts, 7 Reb | Pts: 2 Tied – 20; Rebs: O. Prewitt – 13; Asts: O. Prewitt – 4; 2 Tied – 6 Reb |

North Charleston Coliseum
North Charleston, SC
Attendance: 4,096
Referees: J. Hartness, G. Shannon, J. Pon

Comcast SportsNet

March 4, 2017
6:00 pm

#7 James Madison 62, #2 College of Charleston 67
Scoring by half: 27–30, 35–37
| Pts: S. Brown – 22; Rebs: 2 Tied – 6 Asts: 4 Tied – 2 J. McLean – 3 Stls | Pts: J. Chealey – 21; Rebs: J. Brantley – 10; Asts: C. Johnson – 4 J. Brantley – 16 Pts |

North Charleston Coliseum
North Charleston, SC
Referees: A. Marotta, L. Andrakakos, T. Morrissey

Comcast SportsNet

March 4, 2017
8:30 pm

#6 Northeastern 54, #3 Towson 82
Scoring by half: 23–37, 31–45
| Pts: T.J. Williams – 15; Rebs: A. Green – 7 Asts: T.J. Williams – 4 A. Green – 4 blocks | Pts: Z. Martin – 17; Rebs: 2 Tied – 8 Asts: A. Adala Moto – 5 E. Keith II – 3 blocks |

North Charleston Coliseum
North Charleston, SC
Attendance: 4,212
Referees: D. Gladden, W. Humes, A.J. Desai

=== Semifinals ===
Comcast SportsNet

March 5, 2017
2:00 pm

#4 William & Mary vs. #1 UNC Wilmington

North Charleston Coliseum
North Charleston, SC

Comcast SportsNet

March 5, 2017
4:30 pm

#3 Towson vs. #2 College of Charleston

North Charleston Coliseum
North Charleston, SC

=== Championship ===
CBS Sports Network

March 6, 2017

#2 College of Charleston vs. #1 UNC Wilmington

North Charleston Coliseum
North Charleston, SC

== Team and tournament leaders ==
=== Team leaders ===
| Team | Points | | Rebounds | | Assists | | Steals | | Blocks | | Minutes | |
|---|---|---|---|---|---|---|---|---|---|---|---|---|
| College of Charleston | | | | | | | | | | | | |
| Elon | | | | | | | | | | | | |
| James Madison | | | | | | | | | | | | |
| Northeastern | | | | | | | | | | | | |
| Towson | | | | | | | | | | | | |
| UNC Wilmington | | | | | | | | | | | | |
| William & Mary | | | | | | | | | | | | |
| Delaware | R. Daly | 51 | R. Daly | 21 | R. Daly | 9 | 2 with | 2 | 3 with | 2 | R. Daly | 80 |
| Drexel | S. Mojica | 15 | R. Williams | 7 | K. Lee | 7 | S. Mojica | 3 | R. Williams | 3 | S. Mojica | 36 |
| Hofstra | J. Wright-Foreman | 23 | R. Gustys | 9 | 3 with | 3 | R. Gustys | 2 | H. Sabety | 1 | J. Wright-Foreman | 39 |

== See also ==
- Colonial Athletic Association
- 2017 CAA women's basketball tournament
