= 2017–18 Drexel Dragons men's basketball team =

American college basketball season

2017–18 Drexel Dragons men's basketball
- Conference: Colonial Athletic Association
- Record: 13–20 (6–12 CAA)
- Head coach: Zach Spiker (2nd season)
- Assistant coaches: Paul Fortier (2nd season); Justin Jennings (2nd season); Rob O'Driscoll (2nd season)
- MVP: Tramaine Isabell
- Home arena: Daskalakis Athletic Center

2017–18 CAA men's basketball standings
	Conf.				Overall
Team	W		L	PCT	W		L	PCT
College of Charleston †	14	–	4	.778	26	–	8	.765
Northeastern	14	–	4	.778	23	–	10	.697
Hofstra	12	–	6	.667	19	–	12	.613
William & Mary	11	–	7	.611	19	–	12	.613
Towson	8	–	10	.444	18	–	14	.563
UNC Wilmington	7	–	11	.389	11	–	21	.344
Delaware	6	–	12	.333	14	–	19	.424
Drexel	6	–	12	.333	13	–	20	.394
James Madison	6	–	12	.333	10	–	22	.313
Elon	6	–	12	.333	14	–	18	.438
† 2018 CAA tournament winner

The 2017–18 Drexel Dragons men's basketball team represented Drexel University during the 2017–18 NCAA Division I men's basketball season. The Dragons, led by second-year head coach Zach Spiker, played their home games at the Daskalakis Athletic Center in Philadelphia, Pennsylvania as members of the Colonial Athletic Association. They finished the season 13–20, 6–12 in CAA play to finish in a four-way tie for seventh place. They defeated James Madison in the first round of the CAA tournament before losing in the quarterfinals to College of Charleston.

On February 22, 2018, the Dragons set the record for the greatest comeback in Division I basketball history when they overcame a 34-point defect (trailing 53–19 at one point) to beat Delaware 85–83.

== Previous season ==
The Dragons finished the 2016–17 season 9–23, 3–15 in CAA play to finish in 10th place. They lost to James Madison in the CAA tournament.

== Offseason ==
=== Departures ===
Name	Number	Pos.	Height	Weight	Year	Hometown	Notes
Kári Jónsson	12	G	6'3"	170	Sophomore	Reykjavík, Iceland	Left team; Signed to Haukar
Elgin Ford, Jr	22	G	6'1"	175	Senior	Lithonia, GA	Graduated
Mohamed Bah	23	F/C	6'9"	240	Senior	Bamako, Mali	Graduated
Rodney Williams	24	F	6'7"	225	Senior	Richmond, VA	Graduated; Signed to Maccabi Ra'anana
Major Canady	25	G	6'4"	215	RS Junior	Wilson, NC	Left team (Injury)
John Moran	30	G	6'3"	185	RS Senior	Phoenixville, PA	Graduated
Jeremy Peck	34	F	6'8"	245	Freshman	Houston, TX	Transferred to UNC Asheville
Andrew Cartwright	35	F	6'6"	215	Junior	Guilford, ME	Left team

=== Incoming transfers ===
College recruiting information
Name	Hometown	School	Height	Weight	Commit date
Alihan Demir; PF	Ankara, Turkey	Central Wyoming College	6 ft 8 in (2.03 m)	215 lb (98 kg)	Apr 15, 2017
Alihan Demir; PF	Recruit ratings: No ratings found				
James Butler; F	Burke, VA	Navy	6 ft 8 in (2.03 m)	230 lb (100 kg)	
James Butler; F	Recruit ratings: ESPN: (56)				
Overall recruit ranking:
Note: In many cases, Scout, Rivals, 247Sports, On3, and ESPN may conflict in their listings of height and weight.; In these cases, the average was taken. ESPN grades are on a 100-point scale.; Sources: "Drexel 2017 Basketball Commitments". Rivals.; "Drexel Dragons". ESPN.; "2017 Team Ranking". Rivals.

=== 2017 recruiting class ===
College recruiting information
Name	Hometown	School	Height	Weight	Commit date
Jarvis Doles; PF	Baltimore, MD	Mount Zion Preparatory School	6 ft 8 in (2.03 m)	N/A	Nov 16, 2016
Jarvis Doles; PF	Recruit ratings: ESPN: (57)				
Tim Perry; PF	Cherry Hill, NJ	The Phelps School	6 ft 10 in (2.08 m)	220 lb (100 kg)	Jan 11, 2017
Tim Perry; PF	Recruit ratings: ESPN: (58)				
Tadas Kararinas; C	Šilutė, Lithuania	Findlay Prep	6 ft 10 in (2.08 m)	220 lb (100 kg)	Aug 31, 2017
Tadas Kararinas; C	Recruit ratings: No ratings found				
Overall recruit ranking:
Note: In many cases, Scout, Rivals, 247Sports, On3, and ESPN may conflict in their listings of height and weight.; In these cases, the average was taken. ESPN grades are on a 100-point scale.; Sources: "Drexel 2017 Basketball Commitments". Rivals.; "Drexel Dragons". ESPN.; "2017 Team Ranking". Rivals.

=== Class of 2018 early commitments ===
College recruiting information (2018)
Name	Hometown	School	Height	Weight	Commit date
Coletrane Washington; SG	Leetsdale, PA	Quaker Valley High School	6 ft 4 in (1.93 m)	N/A	Oct 28, 2017
Coletrane Washington; SG	Recruit ratings: No ratings found				
Overall recruit ranking:
Note: In many cases, Scout, Rivals, 247Sports, On3, and ESPN may conflict in their listings of height and weight.; In these cases, the average was taken. ESPN grades are on a 100-point scale.; Sources: "Drexel 2018 Basketball Commitments". Rivals.; "Drexel Dragons". ESPN.; "2018 Team Ranking". Rivals.

== Preseason ==
In a poll of the league coaches, media relations directors, and media members at the CAA's media day, Drexel was picked to finish in ninth place in the CAA. Sophomore guard Kurk Lee was named to the preseason All-CAA second team.

== Roster ==
2017–18 Drexel Dragons men's basketball team
Players
Coaches

Pos.	#	Name	Height	Weight	Year	Previous school	Hometown
G	0	Miles Overton	6 ft 4 in (1.93 m)	215 lb (98 kg)	RS Sr	Saint Joseph's Prep/Wake Forest	Philadelphia, PA
G	1	Kurk Lee Jr	5 ft 9 in (1.75 m)	150 lb (68 kg)	So	St. Frances (MD)	Baltimore, MD
G	2	Tramaine Isabell	6 ft 1 in (1.85 m)	180 lb (82 kg)	RS Jr	Garfield HS (WA)/Missouri	Seattle, WA
G	3	Troy Harper	6 ft 1 in (1.85 m)	175 lb (79 kg)	RS Jr	Neumann-Goretti HS/Campbell	Philadelphia, PA
F	4	Sam Green (injured) (redshirt)	6 ft 6 in (1.98 m)	220 lb (100 kg)	So	Bishop McNamara HS	Forestville, MD
F	5	Austin Williams	6 ft 8 in (2.03 m)	245 lb (111 kg)	Sr	Trinity Episcopal HS	Richmond, VA
F	11	Jarvis Doles	6 ft 9 in (2.06 m)	215 lb (98 kg)	Fr	Mount Zion Preparatory School	Columbia, MD
F	13	Tim Perry Jr (redshirt)	6 ft 10 in (2.08 m)	218 lb (99 kg)	Fr	The Phelps School	Cherry Hill, NJ
G	14	Kris Alford (W)	6 ft 2 in (1.88 m)	185 lb (84 kg)	So	Valley Christian	Los Angeles, CA
G	15	Sammy Mojica	6 ft 3 in (1.91 m)	195 lb (88 kg)	Sr	Brimmer and May School	Chestnut Hill, MA
G	24	Kevin Doi (W)	5 ft 9 in (1.75 m)	165 lb (75 kg)	RS Jr	Chadwick School	Rolling Hills Estates, CA
F	30	Alihan Demir	6 ft 9 in (2.06 m)	223 lb (101 kg)	RS So	West Oaks Academy/Central Wyoming	Ankara, Turkey
C	32	Tadas Kararinas	6 ft 10 in (2.08 m)	210 lb (95 kg)	Fr	Findlay Prep	Šilutė, Lithuania
F	51	James Butler (redshirt)	6 ft 8 in (2.03 m)	228 lb (103 kg)	RS Fr	Lake Braddock/Navy	Burke, VA
F	55	Tyshawn Myles	6 ft 8 in (2.03 m)	250 lb (113 kg)	Sr	Washington Heights	Queens, NY

Head coach

- Zach Spiker (Ithaca)

Assistant coach(es)

- Paul Fortier (Washington)
- Justin Jennings (Penn State Behrend)
- Rob O'Driscoll (Villanova)

Legend

- (C) Team captain
- (S) Suspended
- (I) Ineligible
- (W) Walk-on
- Injured
- Current redshirt

Roster
Last update: September 26, 2017

== Schedule and results ==
Date time, TV	Rank^{#}	Opponent^{#}	Result	Record	High points	High rebounds	High assists	Site (attendance) city, state
Exhibition
October 28, 2017*; 4:00 pm		West Chester	W 92–89	–	22 – Lee	7 – Williams	4 – Tied	Daskalakis Athletic Center; Philadelphia, PA
November 1, 2017*; 9:00 pm		at No. 6 Villanova; Puerto Rico Hurricane Relief Exhibition	L 68–87	–	16 – Kararinas	5 – Mojica	4 – Lee	Jake Nevin Field House; Villanova, PA
Non-conference regular season
November 10, 2017*; 7:00 pm		Bowling Green	L 69–78	0–1	18 – Williams	12 – Williams	3 – Lee	Daskalakis Athletic Center (2,504); Philadelphia, PA
November 13, 2017*; 7:00 pm		Arcadia	W 95–81	1–1	22 – Isabell	8 – Harper	5 – Tied	Daskalakis Athletic Center (738); Philadelphia, PA
November 17, 2017*; 2:30 pm		vs. Houston; Paradise Jam quarterfinals	W 84–80	2–1	21 – Isabell	16 – Isabell	3 – Isabell	Vines Center (1,022); Lynchburg, VA
November 18, 2017*; 6:00 pm		vs. Mercer; Paradise Jam Semifinals	L 59–78	2–2	14 – Isabell	7 – Tied	7 – Lee	Vines Center (534); Lynchburg, VA
November 19, 2017*; 6:00 pm		vs. Drake; Paradise Jam 3rd Place Game	L 88–90 ^{2OT}	2–3	32 – Isabell	14 – Williams	5 – Lee	Vines Center (577); Lynchburg, VA
November 25, 2017*; 4:00 pm, ESPN3		at NJIT	L 53–65	2–4	13 – Lee	11 – Williams	3 – Lee	Wellness and Events Center (677); Newark, NJ
November 29, 2017*; 7:00 pm		Lafayette	W 68–67	3–4	19 – Isabell	10 – Williams	4 – Tied	Daskalakis Athletic Center (617); Philadelphia, PA
December 2, 2017*; 4:00 pm		Rider	W 89–77	4–4	35 – Isabell	10 – Isabell	6 – Lee	Daskalakis Athletic Center (1,010); Philadelphia, PA
December 7, 2017*; 7:00 pm		at La Salle	W 72–70	5–4	23 – Lee	8 – Tied	5 – Demir	Tom Gola Arena (1,451); Philadelphia, PA
December 10, 2017*; 2:00 pm		at Robert Morris	L 60–74	5–5	15 – Lee	11 – Williams	3 – Lee	PPG Paints Arena (621); Pittsburgh, PA
December 16, 2017*; 5:00 pm, ESPN3		at Temple	L 60–63	5–6	16 – Demir	10 – Williams	5 – Isabell	Liacouras Center (5,324); Philadelphia, PA
December 18, 2017*; 7:00 pm		Quinnipiac	W 72–71	6–6	23 – Isabell	8 – Tied	4 – Isabell	Daskalakis Athletic Center (652); Philadelphia, PA
December 21, 2017*; 7:00 pm		at Loyola (MD)	L 62–66	6–7	20 – Lee	14 – Williams	4 – Lee	Reitz Arena (504); Baltimore, MD
CAA regular season
December 30, 2017; 2:00 pm		at Elon	L 75–90	6–8 (0–1)	18 – Lee	14 – Williams	4 – Lee	Alumni Gym (1,607); Elon, NC
January 2, 2018; 7:00 pm		at UNC Wilmington	L 87–107	6–9 (0–2)	22 – Lee	7 – Mojica	4 – Lee	Trask Coliseum (3,367); Wilmington, NC
January 5, 2018; 7:00 pm		College of Charleston	W 87–82 ^{OT}	7–9 (1–2)	22 – Lee	13 – Williams	4 – Demir	Daskalakis Athletic Center (704); Philadelphia, PA
January 7, 2018; 4:00 pm		William & Mary	L 63–85	7–10 (1–3)	14 – Tied	6 – Tied	5 – Lee	Daskalakis Athletic Center (679); Philadelphia, PA
January 11, 2018; 7:00 pm		at Delaware	L 66–72	7–11 (1–4)	14 – Isabell	15 – Isabell	4 – Isabell	Bob Carpenter Center (1,948); Newark, DE
January 13, 2018; 4:00 pm		Hofstra	L 86–91	7–12 (1–5)	25 – Isabell	8 – Williams	5 – Isabell	Daskalakis Athletic Center (833); Philadelphia, PA
January 18, 2018; 7:00 pm		at Towson	L 68–90	7–13 (1–6)	14 – Williams	6 – Isabell	5 – Lee	SECU Arena (1,333); Towson, MD
January 20, 2018; 4:00 pm		at James Madison	L 73–75	7–14 (1–7)	21 – Isabell	10 – Isabell	5 – Demir	JMU Convocation Center (2,611); Harrisonburg, VA
January 25, 2018; 7:00 pm		Elon	W 83–79	8–14 (2–7)	40 – Isabell	8 – Williams	4 – Tied	Daskalakis Athletic Center (843); Philadelphia, PA
January 27, 2018; 2:00 pm		Northeastern	W 68–67	9–14 (3–7)	21 – Isabell	11 – Williams	4 – Isabell	Daskalakis Athletic Center (1,526); Philadelphia, PA
February 1, 2018; 7:00 pm		James Madison	W 76–74	10–14 (4–7)	17 – Harper	8 – Williams	4 – Isabell	Daskalakis Athletic Center (705); Philadelphia, PA
February 3, 2018; 4:00 pm		at William & Mary	W 91–79	11–14 (5–7)	23 – Isabell	8 – Tied	8 – Isabell	Kaplan Arena (3,758); Williamsburg, VA
February 8, 2018; 7:00 pm		Towson	L 92–94 ^{OT}	11–15 (5–8)	32 – Isabell	8 – Demir	7 – Isabell	Daskalakis Athletic Center (825); Philadelphia, PA
February 10, 2018; 4:00 pm		at College of Charleston	L 67–89	11–16 (5–9)	17 – Isabell	7 – Demir	3 – Lee	TD Arena (4,219); Charleston, SC
February 15, 2018; 7:00 pm		at Northeastern	L 69–75	11–17 (5–10)	24 – Isabell	7 – Demir	4 – Lee	Matthews Arena (990); Boston, MA
February 17, 2018; 4:00 pm		at Hofstra	L 76–88	11–18 (5–11)	29 – Isabell	9 – Demir	5 – Demir	Mack Sports Complex (2,312); Hempstead, NY
February 22, 2018; 7:00 pm		Delaware	W 85–83	12–18 (6–11)	30 – Isabell	12 – Isabell	9 – Isabell	Daskalakis Athletic Center (1,116); Philadelphia, PA
February 24, 2018; 4:00 pm		UNC Wilmington	L 82–83	12–19 (6–12)	29 – Isabell	14 – Williams	6 – Isabell	Daskalakis Athletic Center (1,094); Philadelphia, PA
CAA Tournament
March 3, 2018; 4:00 pm	(8)	vs. (9) James Madison; First round	W 70–62	13–19	24 – Isabell	15 – Williams	5 – Isabell	North Charleston Coliseum (2,659); North Charleston, SC
March 4, 2018; 12:00 pm	(8)	vs. (1) College of Charleston; Quarterfinals	L 59–66	13–20	15 – Lee	12 – Isabell	3 – Lee	North Charleston Coliseum (4,672); North Charleston, SC
*Non-conference game. ^{#}Rankings from AP. (#) Tournament seedings in parentheses. All times are in Eastern Time.

== Team statistics ==
As of the end of the season.
Indicates team leader in each category.

(FG%, FT% leader = minimum 50 att.; 3P% leader = minimum 20 att.)

Player	GP	GS	MPG	PPG	RPG	APG	SPG	BPG	TPG	FG%	FT%	3P%
Kris Alford	3	0	1.3	1.0	0.0	0.0	0.0	0.3	0.0	1.000	1.000	.000
Alihan Demir	28	24	31.3	10.7	5.4	1.9	0.4	0.1	1.7	.480	.750	.365
Kevin Doi	7	0	1.1	0.0	0.0	0.0	0.0	0.0	0.0	.000	.000	.000
Jarvis Doles	23	10	12.9	3.3	2.1	0.1	0.2	0.0	0.3	.431	.813	.359
Sam Green	6	1	13.5	4.7	2.5	0.8	0.2	0.0	0.5	.550	.333	.400
Troy Harper	25	10	23.9	10.1	2.2	1.4	0.5	0.1	1.8	.383	.816	.159
Tramaine Isabell|	28	20	34.4	21.0	7.5	3.4	1.2	0.0	2.9	.474	.764	.340
Tadas Kararinas	32	0	7.4	1.6	0.8	0.2	0.1	0.3	0.3	.395	.900	.381
Kurk Lee	33	32	35.9	12.4	3.4	3.2	1.2	0.1	2.3	.385	.759	.342
Sammy Mojica	33	33	35.6	11.1	4.0	1.5	1.5	0.3	1.4	.378	.649	.320
Tyshawn Myles	22	4	10.8	2.1	2.4	0.1	0.3	0.7	0.6	.600	.680	.000
Miles Overton	10	1	12.6	4.2	1.1	0.5	0.2	0.1	1.0	.292	1.000	.258
Austin Williams	31	30	29.6	9.4	8.5	0.7	0.4	3.0	2.0	.597	.459	.000
Team	33	-	-	74.4	36.3	11.5	5.3	4.2	12.4	.441	.723	.325

== Awards ==
Tramaine Isabell

- Team Most Valuable Player
- CAA All-Conference Second Team
- 2017 Paradise Jam All-Tournament Team
- CAA Player of the Week (3)

Austin Williams

- "Sweep" Award (team leader in blocks)
- Dragon "D" Award (team's top defensive player)
- CAA All-Defensive Team

Jarvis Doles

- CAA Rookie of the Week

Kurk Lee

- Assist Award (team leader in assists)
- Preseason CAA All-Conference Second Team

Tim Perry Jr

- Samuel D. Cozen Award (most improved player)

Troy Harper

- Donald Shank Spirit & Dedication Award

Alihan Demir

- Team Academic Award

== See also ==
- 2017–18 Drexel Dragons women's basketball team
