= 2018 CAA men's basketball tournament =

- Classification: Division I
- Season: 2017–18
- Teams: 10
- Site: North Charleston Coliseum; North Charleston, South Carolina
- Champions: College of Charleston (1st title)
- Winning coach: Earl Grant (1st title)
- MVP: Grant Riller (College of Charleston)
- Attendance: 21,941
- Top scorer: Joe Chealey (College of Charleston) (70 points)
- Television: CAA.tv, CBSSN

2017–18 CAA men's basketball standings
	Conf.				Overall
Team	W		L	PCT	W		L	PCT
College of Charleston †	14	–	4	.778	26	–	8	.765
Northeastern	14	–	4	.778	23	–	10	.697
Hofstra	12	–	6	.667	19	–	12	.613
William & Mary	11	–	7	.611	19	–	12	.613
Towson	8	–	10	.444	18	–	14	.563
UNC Wilmington	7	–	11	.389	11	–	21	.344
Delaware	6	–	12	.333	14	–	19	.424
Drexel	6	–	12	.333	13	–	20	.394
James Madison	6	–	12	.333	10	–	22	.313
Elon	6	–	12	.333	14	–	18	.438
† 2018 CAA tournament winner

The 2018 Colonial Athletic Association men's basketball tournament was the postseason men's basketball tournament for the Colonial Athletic Association for the 2017–18 NCAA Division I men's basketball season. The tournament was held March 3–6, 2018 at the North Charleston Coliseum in North Charleston, South Carolina. The College of Charleston received the CAA's automatic bid to the NCAA tournament with an 83–76 overtime win over Northeastern in the championship game.

== Tournament changes ==
On July 11, 2017, it was announced that the tournament, which was previously played on a Friday–Monday format, would move to a Saturday–Tuesday format beginning with the 2018 tournament. It was also announced that the semifinals and championship would be televised on CBS Sports Network through the 2021 tournament.

== Seeds ==
All 10 CAA teams participated in the tournament. Teams were seeded by conference record, with a tiebreaker system used to seed teams with identical conference records. The top six teams received a bye to the quarterfinals.

Seed	School	Conf.	Tiebreaker 1	Tiebreaker 2
1	College of Charleston	14–4	2–0 vs Northeastern	
2	Northeastern	14–4	0–2 vs CofC	
3	Hofstra	12–6		
4	William & Mary	11–7		
5	Towson	8–10		
6	UNC Wilmington	7–11		
7	Delaware	6–12	4–2 vs Drexel/JMU/Elon	
8	Drexel	6–12	3–3 vs UD/JMU/Elon	2–2 vs CofC/Northeastern
9	James Madison	6–12	3–3 vs UD/Drexel/Elon	0–4 vs CofC/Northeastern
10	Elon	6–12	2–4 vs UD/Drexel/JMU	

== Schedule ==
Session	Game	Time*	Matchup	Score	Television
First round – Saturday March 3, 2018
1	1	4:00 pm	No. 9 James Madison vs No. 8 Drexel	62–70	CAA.tv
1	2	6:30 pm	No. 10 Elon vs No. 7 Delaware	79–86	CAA.tv
Quarterfinals – Sunday March 4, 2018
2	3	12:00 pm	No. 8 Drexel vs No. 1 College of Charleston	59–66	CAA.tv
2	4	2:30 pm	No. 5 Towson vs No. 4 William & Mary	66–80	CAA.tv
3	5	6:00 pm	No. 7 Delaware vs No. 2 Northeastern	50–74	CAA.tv
3	6	8:30 pm	No. 6 UNC Wilmington vs No. 3 Hofstra	93–88	CAA.tv
Semifinals – Monday March 5, 2018
4	7	6:00 pm	No. 4 William and Mary vs No. 1 College of Charleston	73–83	CBSSN
4	8	8:30 pm	No. 6 UNC Wilmington vs No. 2 Northeastern	52–79	CBSSN
Championship – Tuesday March 6, 2018
5	9	7:00 pm	No. 2 Northeastern vs No. 1 College of Charleston	76–83^{OT}	CBSSN
*Game times in ET. Rankings denote tournament seed

== Bracket ==
First round Saturday, March 3 CAA.tv
8	Drexel	70
9	James Madison	62
7	Delaware	86
10	Elon	79

Quarterfinals; Sunday, March 4 CAA.tv
1	College of Charleston	66
8	Drexel	59
4	William & Mary	80
5	Towson	66
2	Northeastern	74
7	Delaware	50
3	Hofstra	88
6	UNC Wilmington	93

Semifinals; Monday, March 5 CBS Sports Network
1	College of Charleston	83
4	William & Mary	73
2	Northeastern	79
6	UNC Wilmington	52

Final; Tuesday, March 6 CBS Sports Network
1	College of Charleston	83*
2	Northeastern	76

* denotes overtime game

== Game summaries ==
=== First round ===
CAA.tv

March 3, 2018
4:00 pm

Recap

No. 9 James Madison 62, No. 8 Drexel 70
Scoring by half: 33–30, 29–40
Pts: Lewis – 15; Rebs: 3 tied – 6 Asts: Lewis – 3 Mosley – 13 Pts	Pts: Isabell – 24; Rebs: Williams – 15; Asts: Isabell – 5 Williams – 7 Blocks

North Charleston Coliseum
North Charleston, SC
Referees: Anthony Franklin, Jon Wall, Matt Dorn

CAA.tv

March 3, 2018
6:30 pm

Recap

No. 10 Elon 79, No. 7 Delaware 86
Scoring by half: 30–41, 49–45
Pts: Thompson – 27; Rebs: Seibring – 9 Asts: Swoope – 9 Santa Ana – 15 Pts, 8 Rebs	Pts: Daly – 23; Rebs: Carter – 11; Asts: 3 Tied – 4 Carter – 20 Pts

North Charleston Coliseum
North Charleston, SC
Attendance: 2,659
Referees: Tony Crisp, Michael Luckie, Matt Lavigne

=== Quarterfinals ===
CAA.tv

March 4, 2018
12:00 pm

Recap

No. 8 Drexel 59, No. 1 College of Charleston 66
Scoring by half: 27–30, 32–36
Pts: Lee – 15; Rebs: Isabell – 12; Asts: Lee – 3 Lee – 5 Stls	Pts: Chealey – 22; Rebs: Brantley – 11; Asts: 3 Tied – 3 Riller – 17 Pts, 5 Rebs

North Charleston Coliseum
North Charleston, SC
Referees: Mark Schnur, AJ Desai, Nathan Farrell

CAA.tv

March 4, 2018
2:30 pm

Recap

No. 5 Towson 66, No. 4 William & Mary 80
Scoring by half: 32–41, 34–39
Pts: Martin – 18; Rebs: Gorham – 10; Asts: Martin – 9 Morsell – 14 Pts, 7 Rebs	Pts: Cohn – 24; Rebs: Knight – 12; Asts: Cohn – 7 Knight – 16 Pts

North Charleston Coliseum
North Charleston, SC
Attendance: 4,672
Referees: Tony Chiazza, Tim Comer, Evon Burroughs

CAA.tv

March 4, 2018
6:00 pm

Recap

No. 7 Delaware 50, No 2. Northeastern 74
Scoring by half: 28–33, 22–41
Pts: Daly – 23; Rebs: Daly – 8 Asts: Allen – 3 Carter – 10 Pts, 4 Rebs	Pts: Boursiquot – 17; Rebs: Green – 10; Asts: Pusica – 10; Pusica – 15 Pts, 8 Rebs

North Charleston Coliseum
North Charleston, SC
Referees: Clarence Armstrong, Justin Porterfield, Greg Evans

CAA.tv

March 4, 2018
8:30 pm

Recap

No. 6 UNC Wilmington 93, No. 3 Hofstra 88
Scoring by half: 40–48, 53–40
Pts: Talley – 37; Rebs: Cacok – 9 Asts: Talley – 7 Taylor II – 10 Pts, 7 Rebs	Pts: Wright-Foreman – 29; Rebs: Gustys – 10; Asts: Wright-Foreman – 6 Buie – 20 Pts

North Charleston Coliseum
North Charleston, SC
Attendance: 2,566
Referees: Tim Clougherty, Jerry Heater, Tom Morrissey

=== Semifinals ===
CBSSN

March 5, 2018
6:00 pm

Recap

No. 4 William & Mary 73, No. 1 College of Charleston 83
Scoring by half: 34–39, 39–44
Pts: Knight – 31; Rebs: Burchfield – 8 Asts: Cohn – 7 Rowley – 14 Pts, 2 Asts	Pts: Riller – 25; Rebs: Brantley – 10; Asts: Pointer – 5 Chealey – 16 Pts, 3 Asts

North Charleston Coliseum
North Charleston, SC
Referees: Tim Clougherty, Matt Potter, Tommy Morrissey

CBSSN

March 5, 2018
8:30 pm

Recap

No. 6 UNC Wilmington 52, No. 2 Northeastern 79
Scoring by half: 27–36, 25–43
Pts: Cacok – 15; Rebs: 2 tied – 9 Asts: Fornes – 3 Fornes – 11 Pts, 5 Rebs	Pts: Pusica – 20; Rebs: Green – 9 Asts: Gresham Jr – 6 Occeus – 18 Pts, 2 Stls

North Charleston Coliseum
North Charleston, SC
Attendance: 4,099
Referees: Tony Chiazza, Mark Schnur, Anthony Franklin

=== Championship ===
CBSSN

March 6, 2018
7:00 pm

Recap

No. 2 Northeastern 76, No. 1 College of Charleston 83 (OT)
Scoring by half: 36–23, 29–42 Overtime: 11–18
Pts: Pusica – 30; Rebs: Gresham Jr – 12; Asts: 3 tied – 4 Boursiquot – 12 Pts, 5 Rebs	Pts: Chealey – 32; Rebs: Brantley – 11; Asts: Chealey – 3 Riller – 20 Pts, 4 Stls

North Charleston Coliseum
North Charleston, SC
Attendance: 7,945
Referees: Justin Porterfield, Nathan Farrell, Evon Burroughs

== Team and tournament leaders ==
=== Team leaders ===
Team	Points		Rebounds		Assists		Steals		Blocks		Minutes	
College of Charleston	Chealey	70	Brantley	32	2 Tied	9	Riller	7	Brantley	6	Chealey	114
Delaware	Daly	46	Carter	15	3 tied	5	Daly	4	Carter	2	Daly	78
Drexel	Isabell	38	Williams	24	Isabell	6	lee	7	Williams	10	Isabell	77
Elon	Thompson	27	Seibring	9	Swoope	9	2 tied	1	Swoope	1	Swoope	39
Hofstra	Wright-Foreman	29	Gustys	10	Wright-Foreman	6	3 tied	1	3 tied	1	Pemberton	38
James Madison	Lewis	15	3 tied	6	Lewis	3	2 tied	2	Banks	2	Lewis	36
Northeastern	Pusica	65	Gresham Jr.	27	Pusica	17	Gresham Jr.	5	2 tied	3	Pusica	117
Towson	Martin	18	Gorham	10	Martin	9	2 tied	2	Tunstall	2	Morsell	38
UNC Wilmington	Talley	47	Cacok	18	Talley	9	Cacok	4	3 tied	1	Taylor II	70
William & Mary	Knight	47	Knight	19	Cohn	14	Cohn	2	2 tied	2	Cohn	79

== See also ==
- 2018 CAA women's basketball tournament
