= 2017–18 Colonial Athletic Association men's basketball season =

- League: NCAA Division I
- Sport: Basketball
- Duration: November, 2017 – March, 2018
- Teams: 10

Regular Season
- Co-champions: College of Charleston, Northeastern
- Runners-up: Hofstra
- Season MVP: Justin Wright-Foreman
- Top scorer: Justin Wright-Foreman (Hofstra)

Tournament
- Champions: College of Charleston
- Runners-up: Northeastern
- Finals MVP: Grant Riller (Charleston)

CAA men's basketball seasons
- ← 2016–17 2018–19 →

2017–18 CAA men's basketball standings
	Conf.				Overall
Team	W		L	PCT	W		L	PCT
College of Charleston †	14	–	4	.778	26	–	8	.765
Northeastern	14	–	4	.778	23	–	10	.697
Hofstra	12	–	6	.667	19	–	12	.613
William & Mary	11	–	7	.611	19	–	12	.613
Towson	8	–	10	.444	18	–	14	.563
UNC Wilmington	7	–	11	.389	11	–	21	.344
Delaware	6	–	12	.333	14	–	19	.424
Drexel	6	–	12	.333	13	–	20	.394
James Madison	6	–	12	.333	10	–	22	.313
Elon	6	–	12	.333	14	–	18	.438
† 2018 CAA tournament winner

The 2017–18 CAA men's basketball season marked the 33rd season of Colonial Athletic Association basketball, taking place between November 2017 and March 2018. Practices commenced in October 2017, and the season ended with the 2018 CAA men's basketball tournament.

== Head coaches ==
=== Coaching changes ===
- On March 17, 2017, head coach Kevin Keatts left UNC Wilmington to accept the head coaching position at NC State. On April 3, 2017, UNC Wilmington announced that C.B. McGrath was hired to replace Kevin Keatts as head coach.

=== Coaches ===
Team	Head coach	Previous job	Year at school	Overall record	CAA record	CAA championships	NCAA Tournaments
College of Charleston	Earl Grant	Clemson (asst.)	4	51–48	25–29	0	0
Delaware	Martin Ingelsby	Notre Dame (asst.)	2	13–20	5–13	0	0
Drexel	Zach Spiker	Army	2	9–23	3–15	0	0
Elon	Matt Matheny	Davidson (asst.)	9	126–130	23–31	0	0
Hofstra	Joe Mihalich	Niagara	5	69–64	36–34	0	0
James Madison	Louis Rowe	Bowling Green (asst.)	2	10–23	7–11	0	0
Northeastern	Bill Coen	Boston College (asst.)	12	177–174	109–87	1	1
Towson	Pat Skerry	Pittsburgh (asst.)	7	98–101	54–52	0	0
UNC Wilmington	C.B. McGrath	North Carolina (asst.)	1	0–0	0–0	0	0
William & Mary	Tony Shaver	Hampden-Sydney College	15	192–239	110–153	0	0

Notes:

- All records, appearances, titles, etc. are from time with current school only.
- Year at school includes 2017–18 season.
- Overall and CAA records are from time at current school and are through the end of the 2016–17 season.

== Preseason ==
=== Preseason poll ===
Rank	Team
1	College of Charleston (38)
2	Towson (2)
3	Elon
4	Hofstra
5	UNC Wilmington
6	Northeastern
7	Delaware
8	William & Mary
9	Drexel
10	James Madison

() first place votes

=== Preseason All-Conference Teams ===
Award	Recipients
First Team	Jarrell Brantley (Charleston); Devontae Cacok (UNCW); Joe Chealey (Charleston); Tyler Seibring (Elon); Justin Wright-Foreman (Hofstra)
Second Team	Ryan Daly (Delaware); Brian Dawkins (Elon); Rokas Gustys (Hofstra); Kurk Lee (Drexel); Mike Morsell (Towson); Grant Riller (Charleston)
Honorable Mention	Devon Begley (Northeastern); David Cohn (William & Mary); Nathan Knight (William & Mary); Jeremy Miller (Northeastern); Deshaun Morman (Towson); Eli Pemberton (Hofstra); Jordon Talley (UNCW)

Colonial Athletic Association Preseason Player of the Year: Joe Chealey (Charleston)

== Regular season ==
=== Head coaches ===
- Earl Grant, Charleston
- Martin Ingelsby, Delaware
- Zach Spiker, Drexel
- Matt Matheny, Elon
- Joe Mihalich, Hofstra
- Louis Rowe, James Madison
- Bill Coen, Northeastern
- Pat Skerry, Towson
- C.B. McGrath, UNC Wilmington
- Tony Shaver, William & Mary

=== Rankings ===
Legend
Increase in ranking
Decrease in ranking
Not ranked previous week

		Pre	Wk 2	Wk 3	Wk 4	Wk 5	Wk 6	Wk 7	Wk 8	Wk 9	Wk 10	Wk 11	Wk 12	Wk 13	Wk 14	Wk 15	Wk 16	Wk 17	Wk 18	Wk 19	Final
College of Charleston	AP																				
College of Charleston	C																				
Delaware	AP																				
Delaware	C																				
Drexel	AP																				
Drexel	C																				
Elon	AP																				
Elon	C																				
Hofstra	AP																				
Hofstra	C																				
James Madison	AP																				
James Madison	C																				
Northeastern	AP																				
Northeastern	C																				
Towson	AP					RV	RV	RV													
Towson	C																				
UNC Wilmington	AP																				
UNC Wilmington	C																				
William & Mary	AP																				
William & Mary	C																				

=== Conference matrix ===
This table summarizes the head-to-head results between teams in conference play.

	Charleston	Delaware	Drexel	Elon	Hofstra	James Madison	Northeastern	Towson	UNC Wilmington	William & Mary
vs. Charleston	–	0–2	1–1	1–1	0–2	0–2	0–2	1–1	0–2	1–1
vs. Delaware	2–0	–	1–1	1–1	2–0	0–2	2–0	2–0	0–2	2–0
vs. Drexel	1–1	1–1	–	1–1	2–0	1–1	1–1	2–0	2–0	1–1
vs. Elon	1–1	1–1	1–1	–	1–1	2–0	2–0	0–2	2–0	2–0
vs. Hofstra	2–0	0–2	0–2	1–1	–	0–2	1–1	0–2	1–1	1–1
vs. James Madison	2–0	2–0	1–1	0–2	2–0	–	2–0	0–2	1–1	2–0
vs. Northeastern	2–0	0–2	1–1	0–2	1–1	0–2	–	0–2	0–2	0–2
vs. Towson	1–1	0–2	0–2	2–0	2–0	2–0	2–0	–	1–1	0–2
vs. UNC Wilmington	2–0	2–0	0–2	0–2	1–1	1–1	2–0	1–1	–	2–0
vs. William & Mary	1–1	0–2	1–1	0–2	1–1	0–2	2–0	2–0	0–2	–
Total	14–4	6–12	6–12	6–12	12–6	6–12	14–4	8–10	7–11	11–7

== Postseason ==
=== Colonial Athletic Association tournament ===
- March 3–6, 2017: Colonial Athletic Association Men's Basketball Tournament, North Charleston Coliseum, North Charleston, South Carolina

=== NCAA tournament ===
The CAA had one bid to the 2018 NCAA Division I men's basketball tournament, that being the automatic bid of College of Charleston by winning the conference tournament.

Seed	Region	School	First Four	First round	Second round	Sweet 16	Elite Eight	Final Four	Championship
13	Midwest	College of Charleston	N/A	eliminated by (4) Auburn 58–62					
Bids		W-L (%):	0–0 (–)	0–1 (.000)	0–0 (–)	0–0 (–)	0–0 (–)	0–0 (–)	TOTAL: 0–1 (.000)

== Awards and honors ==
=== Regular season ===
==== CAA Player-of-the-Week ====
- Nov. 13 – Ryan Daly (Delaware)
- Nov. 20 – Eli Pemberton (Hofstra)
- Nov. 27 – Mike Morsell (Towson), David Cohn (William & Mary)
- Dec. 4 – Connor Burchfield (William & Mary), Tramaine Isabell (Drexel)
- Dec. 11 – Justin Wright-Foreman (Hofstra)
- Dec. 18 – Stuckey Mosley (James Madison), Justin Wright-Foreman (Hofstra)(2)
- Dec. 26 – Grant Riller (Charleston)
- Jan. 2 – Nathan Knight (William & Mary)
- Jan. 8 – Nathan Knight (William & Mary)(2)
- Jan. 15 – Justin Wright-Foreman (Hofstra)(3)
- Jan. 22 – Joe Chealey (Charleston)
- Jan. 29 – Tramaine Isabell (Drexel)(2), Zane Martin (Towson)
- Feb. 5 – Joe Chealey (Charleston)(2), Tyler Seibring (Elon)
- Feb. 12 – Devontae Cacok (UNCW), Grant Riller (Charleston)(2)
- Feb. 19 – Grant Riller (Charleston)(3)
- Feb. 26 – David Cohn (William & Mary)(2), Tramaine Isabell (Drexel)(3)

==== CAA Rookie-of-the-Week ====
- Nov. 13 – Tomas Murphy (Northeastern)
- Nov. 20 – Jarvis Doles (Drexel)
- Nov. 27 – Matt Lewis (James Madison)
- Dec. 4 – Ryan Allen (Delaware)
- Dec. 11 – Jalen Ray (Hofstra)
- Dec. 18 – Kevin Anderson (Delaware)
- Dec. 26 – Kevin Anderson (Delaware)(2)
- Jan. 2 – Vasa Pusica (Northeastern)
- Jan. 8 – Matt Lewis (James Madison)(2)
- Jan. 15 – Tomas Murphy (Northeastern)(2)
- Jan. 22 – Darius Banks (James Madison)
- Jan. 29 – Matt Lewis (James Madison)(3)
- Feb. 5 – Ryan Allen (Delaware)(2)
- Feb. 12 – Ryan Allen (Delaware)(3)
- Feb. 19 – Matt Lewis (James Madison)(4)
- Feb. 26 – Jalen Ray (Hofstra)(2)

=== Postseason ===
==== CAA All-Conference Teams and Awards ====
Award	Recipients
Player of the Year	Justin Wright-Foreman (Hofstra)
Coach of the Year	Bill Coen (Northeastern)
Rookie of the Year	Ryan Allen (Delaware)
Defensive Player of the Year	Shawn Occeus (Northeastern)
Sixth Man of the Year	Bolden Brace (Northeastern)
Dean Ehlers Leadership Award	Tyler Seibring (Elon)
Scholar-Athlete of the Year	Paul Rowley (William & Mary)
First Team	Devontae Cacok (UNCW); Joe Chealey (Charleston); Vasa Pusica (Northeastern); Grant Riller (Charleston); Justin Wright-Foreman (Hofstra)
Second Team	Jarrell Brantley (Charleston); Tramaine Isabell (Drexel); Nathan Knight (William & Mary); Zane Martin (Towson); Tyler Seibring (Elon)
Third Team	David Cohn (William & Mary); Ryan Daly (Delaware); Rokas Gustys (Hofstra); Stuckey Mosley (James Madison); Justin Pierce (William & Mary); Jordon Talley (UNCW)
All-Defensive Team	Devontae Cacok (UNCW); Cameron Johnson (Charleston); Nathan Knight (William & Mary); Shawn Occeus (Northeastern); Austin Williams (Drexel)
All-Rookie Team	Ryan Allen (Delaware); Darius Banks (James Madison); Matt Lewis (James Madison); Tomas Murphy (Northeastern); Jalen Ray (Hofstra)
All-Tournament Team	Jarrell Brantley (Charleston); Joe Chealey (Charleston); Nathan Knight (William & Mary); Shawn Occeus (Northeastern); Vasa Pusica (Northeastern)
Tournament MVP	Grant Riller (Charleston)

== Attendance ==
Team	Arena	Capacity	Game 1	Game 2	Game 3	Game 4	Game 5	Game 6	Game 7	Game 8	Total	Average	% of Capacity
Team	Arena	Capacity	Game 9	Game 10	Game 11	Game 12	Game 13	Game 14	Game 15	Game 16	Total	Average	% of Capacity
Charleston	TD Arena	5,100	4,955	3,889	3,233	3,227	3,195	4,343	2,894	3,705	58,795	3,920	77%
Charleston	TD Arena	5,100	3,649	4,045	4,030	3,857	4,219	4,809	4,745		58,795	3,920	77%
Delaware	Bob Carpenter Center	5,100	2,880	2,119	2,326	4,737	1,922	2,450	2,280	2,388	41,367	2,758	54%
Delaware	Bob Carpenter Center	5,100	1,948	2,350	4,737	2,828	2,368	2,547	3,487		41,367	2,758	54%
Drexel	Daskalakis Athletic Center	2,509	2,504	738	617	1,010	652	704	679	833	13,846	989	39%
Drexel	Daskalakis Athletic Center	2,509	843	1,526	705	825	1,116	1,094			13,846	989	39%
Elon	Alumni Gym	1,607	1,386	1,490	1,534	1,386	1,607	1,309	1,833	1,855	20,757	1,597	99%
Elon	Alumni Gym	1,607	1,647	1,719	1,553	1,847	1,591				20,757	1,597	99%
Hofstra	Hofstra Arena	5,023	2,703	1,013	1,209	1,062	2,012	1,514	1,361	1,952	22,800	1,900	38%
Hofstra	Hofstra Arena	5,023	2,508	2,102	2,312	3,052					22,800	1,900	38%
James Madison	JMU Convocation Center	6,426	4,598	2,451	2,062	2,965	2,439	2,308	2,050	2,938	37,305	2,665	41%
James Madison	JMU Convocation Center	6,426	2,190	2,611	4,538	1,038	2,454	2,663			37,305	2,665	41%
Northeastern	Matthews Arena	6,000	1,014	1,376	974	779	1,600	692	2,259	782	15,903	1,136	19%
Northeastern	Matthews Arena	6,000	901	1,106	1,341	990	1,129	960			15,903	1,136	19%
Towson	SECU Arena	5,200	1,175	878	2,456	1,632	1,251	1,410	1,257	1,333	20,331	1,564	30%
Towson	SECU Arena	5,200	1,307	2,076	2,263	2,022	1,271				20,331	1,564	30%
UNC Wilmington	Trask Coliseum	5,200	4,663	4,415	4,236	3,865	3,931	3,367	4,006	4,405	55,442	4,265	82%
UNC Wilmington	Trask Coliseum	5,200	3,988	4,384	5,200	4,173	4,809				55,442	4,265	82%
William & Mary	Kaplan Arena	8,600	2,001	1,005	2,423	1,727	2,880	3,784	3,673	3,958	46,147	3,296	38%
William & Mary	Kaplan Arena	8,600	4,044	3,508	3,758	5,825	3,912	3,649			46,147	3,296	38%
