= 2017–18 William & Mary Tribe men's basketball team =

American college basketball season

2017–18 William & Mary Tribe men's basketball
- Conference: Colonial Athletic Association
- Record: 19–12 (11–7 CAA)
- Head coach: Tony Shaver (15th season)
- Assistant coaches: Jonathan Holmes; Kotie Kimble; Austin Shaver
- Home arena: Kaplan Arena

2017–18 CAA men's basketball standings
	Conf.				Overall
Team	W		L	PCT	W		L	PCT
College of Charleston †	14	–	4	.778	26	–	8	.765
Northeastern	14	–	4	.778	23	–	10	.697
Hofstra	12	–	6	.667	19	–	12	.613
William & Mary	11	–	7	.611	19	–	12	.613
Towson	8	–	10	.444	18	–	14	.563
UNC Wilmington	7	–	11	.389	11	–	21	.344
Delaware	6	–	12	.333	14	–	19	.424
Drexel	6	–	12	.333	13	–	20	.394
James Madison	6	–	12	.333	10	–	22	.313
Elon	6	–	12	.333	14	–	18	.438
† 2018 CAA tournament winner

The 2017–18 William & Mary Tribe men's basketball team represented the College of William & Mary during the 2017–18 NCAA Division I men's basketball season. The Tribe were coached by 15th-year head coach Tony Shaver and played their home games at Kaplan Arena in Williamsburg, Virginia as members of the Colonial Athletic Association. The Tribe finished the season 19–12, 11–7 in CAA play to finish in fourth place. They defeated Towson in the quarterfinals of the CAA tournament before losing in the semifinals to College of Charleston.

== Previous season ==
The Tribe finished the 2016–17 season 17–14, 10–8 in CAA play to finish in a tie for fourth place. As the No. 4 seed in the CAA tournament, they defeated Elon in the quarterfinals before losing to UNC Wilmington in the semifinals.

== Offseason ==
=== Departures ===
Name	Number	Pos.	Height	Weight	Year	Hometown	Reason for departure
Daniel Dixon	0	G	6'6"	210	Senior	Great Falls, VA	Graduated
Omar Prewitt	4	G/F	6'7"	195	Senior	Mount Sterling, KY	Graduated
Greg Malinowski	5	G/F	6'6"	210	Junior	Chantilly, VA	Graduate transferred to Georgetown
Jack Whitman	41	F	6'9"	235	Junior	Lexington, KY	Graduate transferred

=== Incoming transfers ===
Name	Number	Pos.	Height	Weight	Year	Hometown	Previous School
Cole Harrison	15	C	6'11"	245	RS Senior	Brentwood, TN	Transferred from Dartmouth. Will eligible to play since Harrison graduated from Dartmouth.

=== Recruiting class of 2017 ===
College recruiting information
Name	Hometown	School	Height	Weight	Commit date
Jihar Williams; SG	Baltimore, MD	Friends School of Baltimore	6 ft 5 in (1.96 m)	190 lb (86 kg)	Jun 22, 2016
Jihar Williams; SG	Recruit ratings: Scout: Rivals: (NR)				
Luke Loewe; PG	Fond du Lac, WI	Fond du Lac High School	6 ft 2 in (1.88 m)	170 lb (77 kg)	Jul 28, 2016
Luke Loewe; PG	Recruit ratings: Scout: Rivals: (NR)				
Overall recruit ranking: 247Sports: 248
Note: In many cases, Scout, Rivals, 247Sports, On3, and ESPN may conflict in their listings of height and weight.; In these cases, the average was taken. ESPN grades are on a 100-point scale.; Sources: "2017 Team Ranking". Rivals.

== Roster ==
2017–18 William & Mary Tribe men's basketball team
Players
Coaches

Pos.	#	Name	Height	Weight	Year	Previous school	Hometown
G	0	Jihar Williams	6 ft 5 in (1.96 m)	195 lb (88 kg)	Fr	Friends School of Baltimore	Baltimore, MD
G	1	Jamison Glover (W)	6 ft 0 in (1.83 m)	195 lb (88 kg)	Sr	Battlefield	Haymarket, VA
G	2	Matt Milon	6 ft 5 in (1.96 m)	195 lb (88 kg)	RS So	Oviedo/Boston College	Oviedo, FL
G	5	Tommy Papas (W)	6 ft 3 in (1.91 m)	195 lb (88 kg)	Sr	Union Catholic	Plainfield, NJ
G	10	Connor Burchfield	6 ft 4 in (1.93 m)	180 lb (82 kg)	Sr	Concord	Concord, NC
G	12	Luke Loewe	6 ft 4 in (1.93 m)	192 lb (87 kg)	Fr	Fond du Lac	Fond du Lac, WI
C	13	Nathan Knight	6 ft 10 in (2.08 m)	235 lb (107 kg)	So	Nottingham/Kimball Union Academy	Syracuse, NY
C	15	Cole Harrison	6 ft 11 in (2.11 m)	252 lb (114 kg)	RS Sr	Montrose Christian; Dartmouth	Brentwood, TN
G	21	Oliver Tot	6 ft 6 in (1.98 m)	200 lb (91 kg)	Sr	Kimball Union Academy	Bratislava, Slovakia
F	22	Paul Rowley	6 ft 8 in (2.03 m)	205 lb (93 kg)	RS Jr	Loudoun Valley	Purcellville, VA
G/F	23	Justin Pierce	6 ft 6 in (1.98 m)	215 lb (98 kg)	So	Glenbard West	Glen Ellyn, IL
G	24	Omar Mostafa (W)	6 ft 2 in (1.88 m)	204 lb (93 kg)	So	Don Bosco Prep	Saddle River, NJ
G/F	33	Amir Shafi (W)	6 ft 4 in (1.93 m)	210 lb (95 kg)	Sr	Westtown School	Delran, NJ
G	34	David Cohn	6 ft 2 in (1.88 m)	168 lb (76 kg)	RS Sr	York/Colorado State	Elmhurst, IL

Head coach

- Tony Shaver (North Carolina)

Assistant coach(es)

- Jonathan Holmes (North Carolina)
- Kotie Kimble (Coastal Carolina)
- Austin Shaver (Virginia)

Legend

- (C) Team captain
- (S) Suspended
- (I) Ineligible
- (W) Walk-on
- Injured
- Current redshirt

Roster

== Program notes ==
- On December 17, Tony Shaver recorded his 200th win as head coach in a 126–69 win against Milligan, becoming the first William & Mary head men's basketball coach to achieve this milestone. This was also the Tribe's highest single-game point total in program history. The previous record (116 points) had been set in a 1995 game against George Mason.
- On January 27, David Cohn recorded his 410th career assist in an 84–81 away win against UNC Wilmington, thus breaking the previous program record (409) set by David Coval between the 1982–83 and 1985–86 seasons. Cohn achieved this feat in only three seasons with the Tribe, having transferred from Colorado State after his freshman year.
- On March 5, William and Mary fell in the CAA Tournament semifinals 83-73 to eventual champion Charleston, nine days after defeating them 114-104 in overtime. This marked the fourth straight year that the Tribe defeated the CAA Champion in the regular season.
- The Tribe finished the season 19–12, one win away from their fourth 20-win season in the last five years.
- The Tribe finished the season with the best team three-point (43.4%) and free throw (81.0%) shooting percentages out of all teams competing in Division I . They also finished with the second-highest overall field goal percentage (51.1%) behind Saint Mary's.
- Point guard David Cohn had 6.7 assists per game (best in the CAA; 11th-best in the NCAA). He also had the best free throw percentage in the CAA (.911; fifth-best in the NCAA), and was second-best in steals per game (1.6). He was the only player in the nation, out of the players on 351 Division I teams, who shot at least 50% from the field (52.9%), 40% on 3-point attempts (42.6%), and 90% in free-throw attempts (91.2%). As of November 2020, he was one of only ten NCAA players to have joined the DI men's basketball's 50-40-90 club since 1993.

== Schedule and results ==
Date time, TV	Rank^{#}	Opponent^{#}	Result	Record	Site (attendance) city, state
Non-conference regular season
Nov 10, 2017*; 8:00 pm		at High Point	L 66–100	0–1	Millis Athletic Convocation Center (1,173); High Point, NC
Nov 15, 2017*; 7:00 pm		Hampton	W 83–76	1–1	Kaplan Arena (2,001); Williamsburg, VA
Nov 18, 2017*; 2:00 pm, ESPN3		at UCF	L 64–75	1–2	CFE Arena (4,143); Orlando, FL
Nov 21, 2017*; 7:00 pm		Shenandoah	W 103–54	2–2	Kaplan Arena (1,005); Williamsburg, VA
Nov 25, 2017*; 7:00 pm		Old Dominion; Rivalry	W 79–77	3–2	Kaplan Arena (2,423); Williamsburg, VA
Nov 29, 2017*; 7:00 pm		Marshall	W 114–104	4–2	Kaplan Arena (1,727); Williamsburg, VA
Dec 02, 2017*; 4:00 pm		at Savannah State	W 108–85	5–2	Tiger Arena (819); Savannah, GA
Dec 06, 2017*; 7:00 pm		at George Mason	W 77–70	6–2	EagleBank Arena (3,406); Fairfax, VA
Dec 09, 2017*; 12:00 pm, BTN Plus		at Ohio State	L 62–97	6–3	Value City Arena (11,158); Columbus, OH
Dec 17, 2017*; 2:00 pm		Milligan	W 126–69	7–3	Kaplan Arena (2,880); Williamsburg, VA
Dec 22, 2017*; 9:00 pm, Facebook		at No. 15 TCU	L 75–86	7–4	Schollmaier Arena (6,207); Fort Worth, TX
CAA regular season
Dec 30, 2017; 4:00 pm		Hofstra	W 90–87	8–4 (1–0)	Kaplan Arena (3,784); Williamsburg, VA
Jan 2, 2018; 2:00 pm		at James Madison	W 84–76	9–4 (2–0)	JMU Convocation Center (2,050); Harrisonburg, VA
Jan 5, 2018; 7:00 pm		at Delaware	W 90–65	10–4 (3–0)	Bob Carpenter Center (2,208); Newark, DE
Jan 7, 2018; 4:00 pm		at Drexel	W 85–63	11–4 (4–0)	Daskalakis Athletic Center (679); Philadelphia, PA
Jan 11, 2018; 7:00 pm		James Madison	W 89–82 ^{OT}	12–4 (5–0)	Kaplan Arena (3,673); Williamsburg, VA
Jan 13, 2018; 4:00 pm		Towson	L 73–99	12–5 (5–1)	Kaplan Arena (3,958); Williamsburg, VA
Jan 18, 2018; 7:00 pm		Northeastern	L 70–90	12–6 (5–2)	Kaplan Arena (4,044); Williamsburg, VA
Jan 20, 2018; 7:00 pm		at Elon	W 80–73	13–6 (6–2)	Alumni Gym (1,647); Elon, NC
Jan 25, 2018; 7:00 pm		at Towson	L 82–96 ^{OT}	13–7 (6–3)	SECU Arena (1,307); Towson, MD
Jan 27, 2018; 7:00 pm		at UNC Wilmington	W 84–81	14–7 (7–3)	Trask Coliseum (4,384); Wilmington, NC
Feb 1, 2018; 7:00 pm		Elon	W 99–92	15–7 (8–3)	Kaplan Arena (3,508); Williamsburg, VA
Feb 3, 2018; 4:00 pm		Drexel	L 79–91	15–8 (8–4)	Kaplan Arena (3,758); Williamsburg, VA
Feb 8, 2018; 7:00 pm		at College of Charleston	L 77–82	15–9 (8–5)	TD Arena (3,857); Charleston, SC
Feb 10, 2018; 2:00 pm		Delaware	W 83–66	16–9 (9–5)	Kaplan Arena (5,825); Williamsburg, VA
Feb 15, 2018; 7:00 pm		at Hofstra	L 84–90	16–10 (9–6)	Mack Sports Complex (2,102); Hempstead, NY
Feb 17, 2018; 4:00 pm		at Northeastern	L 67–69	16–11 (9–7)	Matthews Arena (1,129); Boston, MA
Feb 22, 2018; 7:00 pm		UNC Wilmington	W 96–83	17–11 (10–7)	Kaplan Arena (3,912); Williamsburg, VA
Feb 24, 2018; 2:00 pm		College of Charleston	W 114–104 ^{OT}	18–11 (11–7)	Kaplan Arena (3,649); Williamsburg, VA
CAA Tournament
Mar 4, 2018; 2:30 pm, CAA.tv	(4)	vs. (5) Towson; Quarterfinals	W 80–66	19–11	North Charleston Coliseum (4,672); North Charleston, SC
Mar 5, 2018; 6:00 pm, CBSSN	(4)	vs. (1) College of Charleston; Semifinals	L 73–83	19–12	North Charleston Coliseum (4,099); North Charleston, SC
*Non-conference game. ^{#}Rankings from AP Poll. (#) Tournament seedings in parentheses. All times are in Eastern Time.

== See also ==
- 2017–18 William & Mary Tribe women's basketball team
