= 2017–18 Hofstra Pride men's basketball team =

American college basketball season

2017–18 Hofstra Pride men's basketball
- Conference: Colonial Athletic Association
- Record: 19–12 (12–6 CAA)
- Head coach: Joe Mihalich (5th season)
- Assistant coaches: Mike Farrelly; Speedy Claxton; Lamar Barrett
- Home arena: Mack Sports Complex

2017–18 CAA men's basketball standings
	Conf.				Overall
Team	W		L	PCT	W		L	PCT
College of Charleston †	14	–	4	.778	26	–	8	.765
Northeastern	14	–	4	.778	23	–	10	.697
Hofstra	12	–	6	.667	19	–	12	.613
William & Mary	11	–	7	.611	19	–	12	.613
Towson	8	–	10	.444	18	–	14	.563
UNC Wilmington	7	–	11	.389	11	–	21	.344
Delaware	6	–	12	.333	14	–	19	.424
Drexel	6	–	12	.333	13	–	20	.394
James Madison	6	–	12	.333	10	–	22	.313
Elon	6	–	12	.333	14	–	18	.438
† 2018 CAA tournament winner

The 2017–18 Hofstra Pride men's basketball team represented Hofstra University during the 2017–18 NCAA Division I men's basketball season. The Pride, led by fifth-year head coach Joe Mihalich, played their home games at Mack Sports Complex in Hempstead, New York as members of the Colonial Athletic Association. They finished the season 19–12, 12–6 in CAA play to finish in third place. They lost in the first round of the CAA tournament to UNC Wilmington.

== Previous season ==
The Pride finished the 2016–17 season 15–17, 7–11 in CAA play to finish in a tie for seventh place. They lost in the first round of the CAA tournament to Delaware.

== Offseason ==
=== Departures ===
Name	Number	Pos.	Height	Weight	Year	Hometown	Notes
Ty Greer	0	F	6'6"	210	Junior	Chicago, IL	Graduate transferred to Ferris State
Deron Powers	2	G	6'0"	170	RS Senior	Williamsburg, VA	Graduated
Brian Bernardi	14	G	6'2"	195	RS Senior	Staten Island, NY	Graduated
Jamall Robinson	24	G/F	6'5"	208	RS Junior	Cheltenham, MD	Graduate transferred to LIU Brooklyn
Andre Walker	44	F/C	6'10"	230	Junior	Gaithersburg, MD	Graduate transferred to Virginia Union

=== Incoming transfers ===
Name	Number	Pos.	Height	Weight	Year	Hometown	Previous School
Tareq Coburn	0	G	6'5"	200	Sophomore	Rosedale, NY	Transferred from St. Bonaventure. Under NCAA transfer rules, Coburn will have to sit out in the 2017–18 season. He will have three years of eligibility left.
Kenny Wormley	2	G	6'4"	180	Junior	Landover, MD	Junior college transferred from Indian Hills CC.
Joel Angus III	12	F	6'6"	240	RS Senior	Brooklyn, NY	Transferred from Southeast Missouri State. Will be eligible to play since Angus III graduated from Southeast Missouri State.

=== 2017 recruiting class ===
College recruiting information
Name	Hometown	School	Height	Weight	Commit date
Matija Radović; F	Belgrade, Serbia	Montverde Academy	6 ft 7 in (2.01 m)	205 lb (93 kg)	
Matija Radović; F	Recruit ratings: No ratings found				
Kevin Schutte; F/C	Zwolle, Overijssel, The Netherlands	CSE Zwolle	6 ft 9 in (2.06 m)	215 lb (98 kg)	
Kevin Schutte; F/C	Recruit ratings: No ratings found				
Jalen Ray; G	Hampton, VA	Hampton	6 ft 2 in (1.88 m)	175 lb (79 kg)	
Jalen Ray; G	Recruit ratings: No ratings found				
Overall recruit ranking:
Note: In many cases, Scout, Rivals, 247Sports, On3, and ESPN may conflict in their listings of height and weight.; In these cases, the average was taken. ESPN grades are on a 100-point scale.; Sources: "2017 Team Ranking". Rivals.

== Preseason ==
In a poll of league coaches, media relations directors, and media members at the CAA's media day, the Pride were picked to finish in fourth place in the CAA. Junior guard Justin Wright-Foreman was named to the preseason All-CAA first team while senior forward Rokas Gustys was named to the second team.

== Roster ==
2017–18 Hofstra Pride men's basketball team
Players
Coaches

Pos.	#	Name	Height	Weight	Year	Previous school	Hometown
G	0	Tareq Coburn	6 ft 5 in (1.96 m)	200 lb (91 kg)	So	Saint Bonaventure University	Rosedale, New York
F	1	Matija Radović	6 ft 7 in (2.01 m)	205 lb (93 kg)	Fr	Montverde Academy (FL)	Belgrade, Serbia
G	2	Kenny Wormley	6 ft 4 in (1.93 m)	180 lb (82 kg)	Jr	Indian Hills CC	Landover, Maryland
G	3	Justin Wright-Foreman	6 ft 0 in (1.83 m)	185 lb (84 kg)	Jr	High School of Construction	Queens, New York
G	4	Desure Buie	6 ft 0 in (1.83 m)	160 lb (73 kg)	Jr	Wings Academy	Bronx, New York
G	5	Eli Pemberton	6 ft 5 in (1.96 m)	197 lb (89 kg)	So	Cheshire Academy	Middletown, Connecticut
F/C	11	Rokas Gustys	6 ft 9 in (2.06 m)	260 lb (118 kg)	Sr	Oak Hill Academy (VA)	Kaunas, Lithuania
F	12	Joel Angus III	6 ft 6 in (1.98 m)	240 lb (109 kg)	RS Sr	Southeast Missouri State	Brooklyn, NY
F/C	14	Kevin Schutte	6 ft 9 in (2.06 m)	215 lb (98 kg)	Fr	CSE Zwolle	Zwolle, Overijssel, The Netherlands
F	15	Stafford Trueheart	6 ft 8 in (2.03 m)	200 lb (91 kg)	So	Canisius High School	Lancaster, New York
G	20	Jalen Ray	6 ft 2 in (1.88 m)	175 lb (79 kg)	Fr	Hampton	Hampton, Virginia
G	23	Connor Klementowicz (W)	6 ft 2 in (1.88 m)	200 lb (91 kg)	So	Gill St. Bernard's School	Freehold, New Jersey
F	33	Hunter Sabety	6 ft 9 in (2.06 m)	260 lb (118 kg)	RS Sr	Tufts	Oceanside, New York

Head coach

- Joe Mihalich (La Salle)

Assistant coach(es)

- Mike Farrelly (Saint Joseph's)
- Speedy Claxton (Hofstra)
- Lamar Barrett (Elizabeth City State)

Legend

- (C) Team captain
- (S) Suspended
- (I) Ineligible
- (W) Walk-on
- Injured
- Current redshirt

Roster

== Schedule and results ==
Date time, TV	Rank^{#}	Opponent^{#}	Result	Record	High points	High rebounds	High assists	Site (attendance) city, state
Non-conference regular season
November 10, 2017*; 7:00 pm		Army	W 77–74	1–0	25 – Wright-Foreman	12 – Gustys	5 – Wright-Foreman	Mack Sports Complex (2,703); Hempstead, NY
November 13, 2017*; 7:00 pm		Kennesaw State	W 75–57	2–0	16 – Wright-Foreman	7 – Angus III	4 – Tied	Mack Sports Complex (1,013); Hempstead, NY
November 16, 2017*; 7:30 pm, ESPNU		vs. Dayton; Charleston Classic quarterfinals	W 72–69	3–0	19 – Wright-Foreman	10 – Gustys	2 – Tied	TD Arena (5,100); Charleston, SC
November 17, 2017*; 9:30 pm, ESPNU		vs. Clemson; Charleston Classic semifinals	L 59–78	3–1	20 – Wright-Foreman	10 – Gustys	3 – Tied	TD Arena (5,100); Charleston, SC
November 19, 2017*; 8:00 pm, ESPNU		vs. Auburn; Charleston Classic 3rd place game	L 78–89	3–2	23 – Pemberton	9 – Gustys	9 – Buie	TD Arena (2,263); Charleston, SC
November 25, 2017*; 2:00 pm		at Siena	L 76–85	3–3	25 – Wright-Foreman	15 – Gustys	5 – Pemberton	Times Union Center (5,512); Albany, NY
November 30, 2017*; 7:00 pm		Molloy	W 107–72	4–3	23 – Wright-Foreman	15 – Gustys	4 – Wormley	Mack Sports Complex (1,209); Hempstead, NY
December 6, 2017*; 7:00 pm		at Monmouth	W 85–84	5–3	24 – Wright-Foreman	11 – Angus II	3 – Tied	OceanFirst Bank Center (2,012); West Long Branch, NJ
December 9, 2017*; 7:00 pm		at Rider	W 88–82	6–3	30 – Wright-Foreman	10 – Tied	5 – Wright-Foreman	Alumni Gymnasium (1,427); Lawrenceville, NJ
December 12, 2017*; 7:00 pm		at Stony Brook	W 84–81	7–3	33 – Wright-Foreman	7 – Tied	3 – Wright-Foreman	Island Federal Credit Union Arena (2,735); Stony Brook, NY
December 20, 2017*; 7:00 pm		vs. Manhattan; Garden City Showcase	L 61–63	7–4	22 – Wright-Foreman	13 – Gustys	3 – Wormley	Center for Recreation and Sports (1,019); Garden City, NY
December 22, 2017*; 8:30 pm, FS1		vs. No. 1 Villanova; Long Island Showcase	L 71–95	7–5	25 – Wright-Foreman	8 – Gustys	5 – Tied	Nassau Veterans Memorial Coliseum (7,892); Uniondale, NY
CAA regular season
December 30, 2017; 4:00 pm		at William & Mary	L 87–90	7–6 (0–1)	36 – Wright-Foreman	6 – Tied	4 – Tied	Kaplan Arena (3,784); Williamsburg, VA
January 2, 2018; 7:00 pm		at Northeastern	W 71–70	8–6 (1–1)	27 – Wright-Foreman	13 – gustys	4 – Wright-Foreman	Matthews Arena (692); Boston, MA
January 5, 2018; 7:00 pm		James Madison	W 87–81 ^{OT}	9–6 (2–1)	26 – Wright-Foreman	18 – Gustys	6 – Wright-Foreman	Mack Sports Complex (1,062); Hempstead, NY
January 7, 2018; 4:00 pm		Elon	L 76–89	9–7 (2–2)	39 – Wright-Foreman	23 – Gustys	6 – Wright-Foreman	Mack Sports Complex (2,012); Hempstead, NY
January 11, 2018; 7:00 pm		at Towson	W 76–73	10–7 (3–2)	34 – Wright-Foreman	7 – Trueheart	6 – Wright-Foreman	SECU Arena (1,257); Towson, MD
January 13, 2018; 4:00 pm		at Drexel	W 91–86	11–7 (4–2)	20 – Tied	16 – Gustys	4 – Ray	Daskalakis Athletic Center (833); Philadelphia, PA
January 18, 2018; 7:00 pm		Delaware	W 90–63	12–7 (5–2)	21 – Pemberton	14 – Gustys	8 – Buie	Mack Sports Complex (1,514); Hempstead, NY
January 20, 2018; 4:00 pm		at College of Charleston	L 70–76	12–8 (5–3)	26 – Wright-Foreman	8 – Gustys	5 – Buie	TD Arena (4,045); Charleston, SC
January 25, 2018; 7:00 pm		Northeastern	L 67–81	12–9 (5–4)	20 – Wright-Foreman	10 – Gustys	3 – 3 tied	Mack Sports Complex (1,361); Hempstead, NY
January 27, 2018; 4:00 pm		at Delaware	W 64–59	13–9 (6–4)	32 – Wright-Foreman	13 – Gustys	3 – Tied	Bob Carpenter Center (4,737); Newark, DE
February 1, 2018; 4:00 pm		UNC Wilmington	W 96–76	14–9 (7–4)	27 – Pemberton	16 – Gustys	10 – Buie	Mack Sports Complex (1,952); Hempstead, NY
February 3, 2018; 7:00 pm		College of Charleston	L 85–86	14–10 (7–5)	24 – Wright-Foreman	9 – Gustys	4 – Buie	Mack Sports Complex (2,508); Hempstead, NY
February 8, 2018; 7:00 pm		at Elon	W 67–48	15–10 (8–5)	27 – Pemberton	20 – Gustys	1 – 4 tied	Alumni Gym (1,553); Elon, NC
February 10, 2018; 4:00 pm		at UNC Wilmington	L 70–90	15–11 (8–6)	15 – Wright-Foreman	10 – Gustys	5 – Buie	Trask Coliseum (5,200); Wilmington, NC
February 15, 2018; 7:00 pm		William & Mary	W 90–84	16–11 (9–6)	26 – Pemberton	21 – Gustys	7 – Wright-Foreman	Mack Sports Complex (2,102); Hempstead, NY
February 17, 2018; 4:00 pm		Drexel	W 88–76	17–11 (10–6)	32 – Wright-Foreman	17 – Gustys	6 – Wright-Foreman	Mack Sports Complex (2,312); Hempstead, NY
February 22, 2018; 7:00 pm		at James Madison	W 77–61	18–11 (11–6)	22 – Pemberton	9 – Gustys	7 – Buie	JMU Convocation Center (2,663); Harrisonburg, VA
February 24, 2018; 4:00 pm		Towson	W 91–86	19–11 (12–6)	27 – Wright-Foreman	8 – Gustys	5 – Wright-Foreman	Mack Sports Complex (3,052); Hempstead, NY
CAA tournament
March 4, 2018; 8:30 pm, CAA.tv	(3)	vs. (6) UNC Wilmington; Quarterfinals	L 88–93	19–12	29 – Wright-Foreman	10 – Gustys	6 – Wright-Foreman	North Charleston Coliseum (2,566); North Charleston, SC
*Non-conference game. ^{#}Rankings from AP. (#) Tournament seedings in parentheses. All times are in Eastern Time.

== See also ==
2017–18 Hofstra Pride women's basketball team
