= 2017–18 Northeastern Huskies men's basketball team =

American college basketball season

2017–18 Northeastern Huskies men's basketball

CAA regular-season co-champions
- Conference: Colonial Athletic Association
- Record: 23–10 (14–4 CAA)
- Head coach: Bill Coen (12th season)
- Assistant coaches: Chris Markwood; Brian McDonald; Bobby Martin
- Home arena: Matthews Arena

2017–18 CAA men's basketball standings
	Conf.				Overall
Team	W		L	PCT	W		L	PCT
College of Charleston †	14	–	4	.778	26	–	8	.765
Northeastern	14	–	4	.778	23	–	10	.697
Hofstra	12	–	6	.667	19	–	12	.613
William & Mary	11	–	7	.611	19	–	12	.613
Towson	8	–	10	.444	18	–	14	.563
UNC Wilmington	7	–	11	.389	11	–	21	.344
Delaware	6	–	12	.333	14	–	19	.424
Drexel	6	–	12	.333	13	–	20	.394
James Madison	6	–	12	.333	10	–	22	.313
Elon	6	–	12	.333	14	–	18	.438
† 2018 CAA tournament winner

The 2017–18 Northeastern Huskies men's basketball team represented Northeastern University during the 2017–18 NCAA Division I men's basketball season. The Huskies, led by 12th-year head coach Bill Coen, played their home games at Matthews Arena in Boston, Massachusetts as members of the Colonial Athletic Association (CAA). They finished the season 23–10, 14–4 in CAA play win a share of the regular season title with College of Charleston. They defeated Delaware and UNC Wilmington to advance to the championship game of the CAA tournament where they lost to College of Charleston. Despite having 23 wins, they did not participate in a postseason tournament.

== Previous season ==
The Huskies finished the 2016–17 season 15–16, 8–10 in CAA play, to finish in sixth place. They lost in the quarterfinals of the CAA tournament to Towson.

== Offseason ==
=== Departures ===
Name	Number	Pos.	Height	Weight	Year	Hometown	Reason for departure
Alex Murphy	0	F	6'8"	225	RS Senior	Wakefield, RI	Graduated
Jimmy Marshall	3	G/F	6'7"	210	Senior	Richmond, VA	Graduated
T. J. Williams	10	G	6'3"	205	Senior	Pflugerville, TX	Graduated
Sajon Ford	21	F	6'11"	210	Sophomore	St. Petersburg, PA	Left team for personal reasons

=== Incoming transfers ===
Name	Number	Pos.	Height	Weight	Year	Hometown	Previous school
Jordan Roland	12	G	6'1"	171	Junior	Syracuse, NY	Transferred from George Washington. Under NCAA transfer rules, Roland will have to sit out for the 2017–18 season; will have two years of remaining eligibility.

=== Recruiting ===
College recruiting information
Name	Hometown	School	Height	Weight	Commit date
Tomas Murphy #27 C	Wakefield, RI	Northfield-Mt. Hermon School	6 ft 8 in (2.03 m)	195 lb (88 kg)	Aug 12, 2016
Tomas Murphy #27 C	Recruit ratings: Scout: Rivals: 247Sports: ESPN: (80)				
Myles Franklin #89 SG	Villa Park, CA	Villa Park High School	6 ft 3 in (1.91 m)	155 lb (70 kg)	Oct 15, 2016
Myles Franklin #89 SG	Recruit ratings: Scout: Rivals: 247Sports: ESPN: (66)				
Derrick Cook; SF	Mableton, GA	Langston Hughes High School	6 ft 8 in (2.03 m)	196 lb (89 kg)	Sep 9, 2016
Derrick Cook; SF	Recruit ratings: Scout: Rivals: 247Sports: ESPN: (NR)				
Jason Strong; SF	Fort Lauderdale, FL	Westminster Academy	6 ft 9 in (2.06 m)	198 lb (90 kg)	Sep 19, 2016
Jason Strong; SF	Recruit ratings: Scout: Rivals: 247Sports: ESPN: (NR)				
Overall recruit ranking:
Note: In many cases, Scout, Rivals, 247Sports, On3, and ESPN may conflict in their listings of height and weight.; In these cases, the average was taken. ESPN grades are on a 100-point scale.; Sources: "2017 Team Ranking". Rivals.

== Roster ==
2017–18 Northeastern Huskies men's basketball team
Players
Coaches

Pos.	#	Name	Height	Weight	Year	Previous school	Hometown
G	0	Derrick Cook	6 ft 4 in (1.93 m)	190 lb (86 kg)	Fr	Langston Hughes	Fairburn, GA
G	1	Shawn Occeus	6 ft 4 in (1.93 m)	208 lb (94 kg)	So	Grandview Prep	Boynton Beach, FL
F	2	Bolden Brace	6 ft 6 in (1.98 m)	227 lb (103 kg)	So	Santa Barbara	Santa Barbara, CA
F	3	Jason Strong	6 ft 8 in (2.03 m)	195 lb (88 kg)	Fr	Westminster Academy	Coconut Creek, FL
G	4	Vasa Pusica	6 ft 5 in (1.96 m)	210 lb (95 kg)	RS Jr	Sunrise Christian Academy; San Diego	Belgrade, Serbia
F	11	Jeremy Miller	6 ft 10 in (2.08 m)	225 lb (102 kg)	Jr	New Hampton School	Milton, MA
G	13	Myles Franklin	6 ft 4 in (1.93 m)	170 lb (77 kg)	Fr	Villa Park	Brea, CA
G/F	14	Maxime Boursiquot	6 ft 5 in (1.96 m)	211 lb (96 kg)	So	Immaculata	Ottawa, ON
G	20	Devon Begley	6 ft 4 in (1.93 m)	198 lb (90 kg)	Sr	Pearland	Pearland, TX
G	22	Donnell Jr. Gresham	6 ft 1 in (1.85 m)	203 lb (92 kg)	RS So	Cretin-Derham Hall	Maplewood, MN
C	30	Anthony Green	6 ft 10 in (2.08 m)	252 lb (114 kg)	Jr	Tilton School	Quincy, MA
F	33	Tomas Murphy	6 ft 8 in (2.03 m)	220 lb (100 kg)	Fr	Northfield Mount Hermon	Wakefield, RI

Head coach

- Bill Coen (Hamilton College)

Assistant coach(es)

- Chris Markwood (Maine)
- Brian McDonald (Northeastern University)
- Bobby Martin (Pittsburgh)

Legend

- (C) Team captain
- (S) Suspended
- (I) Ineligible
- (W) Walk-on
- Injured
- Current redshirt

Roster
Last update: July 31, 2024

== Schedule and results ==
Date time, TV	Rank^{#}	Opponent^{#}	Result	Record	Site (attendance) city, state
Non-conference regular season
November 10, 2017*; 7:30 p.m.		at Boston University	W 65–59	1–0	Case Gym (1,535); Boston, MA
November 12, 2017*; 4:00 p.m.		Wentworth	W 83–49	1–1	Matthews Arena (1,014); Boston, MA
November 17, 2017*; 6:00 p.m., P12N		at Stanford; Phil Knight Invitational	L 59–73	2–1	Maples Pavilion (2,998); Stanford, CA
November 19, 2017*; 2:00 p.m.		at Ohio State; Phil Knight Invitational	L 55–80	2–2	Value City Arena (10,779); Columbus, OH
November 24, 2017*; 3:30 p.m.		vs. Utah State; Phil Knight Invitational sub-regional	L 67–71	2–3	Nashville Municipal Auditorium (400); Nashville, TN
November 25, 2017*; 3:00 p.m.		vs. Furman; Phil Knight Invitational sub-regional	L 67–78	2–4	Nashville Municipal Auditorium (400); Nashville, TN
November 30, 2017*; 7:00 p.m., NESN		Harvard	W 77–61	3–4	Matthews Arena (1,376); Boston, MA
December 2, 2017*; 4:00 p.m.		Cornell	W 84–66	4–4	Matthews Arena (974); Boston, MA
December 5, 2017*; 7:00 p.m., NESN+		Bucknell	W 82–64	5–4	Matthews Arena (779); Boston, MA
December 9, 2017*; 4:00 p.m.		Vermont	W 71–67	6–4	Matthews Arena (1,600); Boston, MA
December 18, 2017*; 7:00 p.m., ESPN3		at Kent State	W 81–69	7–4	MAC Center (1,963); Kent, OH
December 20, 2017*; 7:00 p.m.		at St. Bonaventure	L 65–84	7–5	Reilly Center (3,278); Olean, NY
CAA regular season
December 30, 2017; 4:00 p.m.		at James Madison	W 80–67	8–5 (1–0)	JMU Convocation Center (782); Harrisonburg, VA
January 2, 2017; 7:00 p.m.		Hofstra	L 70–71	8–6 (1–1)	Matthews Arena (692); Boston, MA
January 5, 2017; 7:00 p.m.		Elon	W 72–60	9–6 (2–1)	Matthews Arena (2,259); Boston, MA
January 7, 2018; 2:00 p.m.		James Madison	W 80–67	10–6 (3–1)	Matthews Arena (782); Boston, MA
January 11, 2017; 7:00 p.m.		at College of Charleston	L 66–82	10–7 (3–2)	TD Arena (3,705); Charleston, SC
January 13, 2017; 7:00 p.m.		at UNC Wilmington	W 81–77	11–7 (4–2)	Trask Coliseum (4,006); Wilmington, NC
January 18, 2017; 7:00 p.m.		at William & Mary	W 90–70	12–7 (5–2)	Kaplan Arena (4,044); Williamsburg, VA
January 20, 2017; 2:00 p.m., NESN+		Delaware	W 76–64	13–7 (6–2)	Matthews Arena (901); Boston, MA
January 25, 2017; 7:00 p.m.		at Hofstra	W 81–67	14–7 (7–2)	Mack Sports Complex (1,361); Hempstead, NY
January 27, 2017; 2:00 p.m.		at Drexel	L 67–68	14–8 (7–3)	Daskalakis Athletic Center (1,526); Philadelphia, PA
February 1, 2017; 7:00 p.m.		College of Charleston	L 64–69	14–9 (7–4)	Matthews Arena (1,106); Boston, MA
February 3, 2017; 4:00 p.m., NESN+		UNC Wilmington	W 107–100 ^{OT}	15–9 (8–4)	Matthews Arena (1,341); Boston, MA
February 8, 2017; 7:00 p.m.		at Delaware	W 70–67	16–9 (9–4)	Bob Carpenter Center (2,368); Newark, DE
February 10, 2017; 4:00 p.m.		at Towson	W 77–62	17–9 (10–4)	SECU Arena (2,263); Towson, MD
February 15, 2017; 7:00 p.m.		Drexel	W 75–69	18–9 (11–4)	Matthews Arena (990); Boston, MA
February 17, 2017; 4:00 p.m.		William & Mary	W 69–67	19–9 (12–4)	Matthews Arena (1,129); Boston, MA
February 22, 2017; 7:00 p.m., NESN		Towson	W 80–75	20–9 (13–4)	Matthews Arena (960); Boston, MA
February 24, 2017; 7:00 p.m.		at Elon	W 81–59	21–9 (14–4)	Alumni Gym (1,847); Elon, NC
CAA tournament
March 4, 2018; 6:00 p.m., CAA.tv	(2)	vs. (7) Delaware; Quarterfinals	W 74–50	22–9	North Charleston Coliseum (2,566); North Charleston, SC
March 5, 2018; 8:30 p.m., CBSSN	(2)	vs. (6) UNC Wilmington; Semifinals	W 79–52	23–9	North Charleston Coliseum (4,099); North Charleston, SC
March 6, 2018; 7:00 p.m., CBSSN	(2)	vs. (1) College of Charleston; Championship game	L 76–83 ^{OT}	23–10	North Charleston Coliseum (7,945); North Charleston, SC
*Non-conference game. ^{#}Rankings from AP poll. (#) Tournament seedings in parentheses. All times are in Eastern.

== See also ==
2017–18 Northeastern Huskies women's basketball team
