= 2017–18 Towson Tigers men's basketball team =

American college basketball season

2017–18 Towson Tigers men's basketball

Gulf Coast Showcase champions Hall of Fame Belfast Classic champions
- Conference: Colonial Athletic Association
- Record: 18–14 (8–10 CAA)
- Head coach: Pat Skerry (7th season)
- Assistant coaches: Kevin Clark; Pat O'Connell; Branden McDonald
- Home arena: SECU Arena

2017–18 CAA men's basketball standings
	Conf.				Overall
Team	W		L	PCT	W		L	PCT
College of Charleston †	14	–	4	.778	26	–	8	.765
Northeastern	14	–	4	.778	23	–	10	.697
Hofstra	12	–	6	.667	19	–	12	.613
William & Mary	11	–	7	.611	19	–	12	.613
Towson	8	–	10	.444	18	–	14	.563
UNC Wilmington	7	–	11	.389	11	–	21	.344
Delaware	6	–	12	.333	14	–	19	.424
Drexel	6	–	12	.333	13	–	20	.394
James Madison	6	–	12	.333	10	–	22	.313
Elon	6	–	12	.333	14	–	18	.438
† 2018 CAA tournament winner

The 2017–18 Towson Tigers men's basketball team represented Towson University during the 2017–18 NCAA Division I men's basketball season. The Tigers, led by seventh-year head coach Pat Skerry, played their home games at the SECU Arena in Towson, Maryland as members of the Colonial Athletic Association. They finished the season 18–14, 8–10 in CAA play to finish in fifth place. They lost in the quarterfinals of the CAA tournament to William & Mary.

== Previous season ==
The Tigers finished the 2016–17 season 20–13, 11–7 in CAA play to finish in third place. In the CAA tournament, they defeated Northeastern in the first round, before losing to College of Charleston in the semifinals. Despite finishing the season with 20 wins, they declined to participate in a postseason tournament.

== Offseason ==
=== Departures ===
Name	Number	Pos.	Height	Weight	Year	Hometown	Notes
J. J. Matthews	1	F	6'8"	240	Freshman	Chicago, IL	Transferred to Moberly Area Community College
Walter Foster	5	F	6'8"	245	Senior	Atlanta, GA	Graduated
John Davis	10	F	6'5"	235	Senior	Philadelphia, PA	Graduated
Arnaud William Adala Moto	24	F	6'7"	245	RS Senior	Yaoundé, Cameroon	Graduated

=== Incoming transfers ===
Name	Number	Pos.	Height	Weight	Year	Hometown	Previous School
Nakye Sanders	20	F	6'8"	235	RS Sophomore	Staten Island, NY	Transferred from Duquesne. Under NCAA transfer rules, Sanders will have to sit out in the 2017–18 season.He will have two years of eligibility left.

=== 2017 recruiting class ===
College recruiting information
Name	Hometown	School	Height	Weight	Commit date
Travis Ingram; G	Suffolk, VA	I. C. Norcom High School	6 ft 3 in (1.91 m)	177 lb (80 kg)	
Travis Ingram; G	Recruit ratings: No ratings found				
Jeffrey Prophete; G	Sunrise, FL	Fort Lauderdale High School	6 ft 2 in (1.88 m)	190 lb (86 kg)	
Jeffrey Prophete; G	Recruit ratings: Rivals:				
Quinton Drayton; F	Bowie, MD	Bowie High School (MD)	6 ft 4 in (1.93 m)	180 lb (82 kg)	
Quinton Drayton; F	Recruit ratings: No ratings found				
Overall recruit ranking:
Note: In many cases, Scout, Rivals, 247Sports, On3, and ESPN may conflict in their listings of height and weight.; In these cases, the average was taken. ESPN grades are on a 100-point scale.; Sources: "2017 Team Ranking". Rivals.

== Preseason ==
In a poll of league coaches, media relations directors, and media members at the CAA's media day, the Tigers were picked to finish in second place in the CAA. Senior guard Mike Morsell was named to the preseason All-CAA second team.

== Roster ==
2017–18 Towson Tigers men's basketball team
Players
Coaches

Pos.	#	Name	Height	Weight	Year	Previous school	Hometown
G	0	Zane Martin	6 ft 4 in (1.93 m)	205 lb (93 kg)	So	Ss. Neumann-Goretti HS	Philadelphia, Pennsylvania
G	1	Travis Ingram	6 ft 3 in (1.91 m)	177 lb (80 kg)	Fr	I. C. Norcom HS	Suffolk, Virginia
G	2	Jordan McNeil	6 ft 5 in (1.96 m)	192 lb (87 kg)	RS Jr	Mount St. Joseph HS	Baltimore, Maryland
G	3	Deshaun Morman	6 ft 3 in (1.91 m)	190 lb (86 kg)	RS Sr	Cincinnati	Richmond, Virginia
F	4	Justin Gorham	6 ft 7 in (2.01 m)	230 lb (104 kg)	So	Calvert Hall College HS	Baltimore, Maryland
G	5	Jeffrey Prophete	6 ft 2 in (1.88 m)	185 lb (84 kg)	Fr	Fort Lauderdale HS	Sunrise, Florida
F	11	Dennis Tunstall	6 ft 8 in (2.03 m)	215 lb (98 kg)	RS So	Life Center Academy	Willingboro, New Jersey
G	12	Van Rolle	6 ft 1 in (1.85 m)	175 lb (79 kg)	Sr	Edgewood HS (MD)	Edgewood, Maryland
G	13	Quinton Drayton	6 ft 5 in (1.96 m)	190 lb (86 kg)	Fr	Bowie HS (MD)	Bowie, Maryland
F	20	Nakye Sanders (redshirt)	6 ft 8 in (2.03 m)	235 lb (107 kg)	RS So	Duquesne	Staten Island, New York
G	22	Brian Starr	6 ft 3 in (1.91 m)	185 lb (84 kg)	Sr	Colby CC	Kansas City, Missouri
G	23	Mike Morsell	6 ft 5 in (1.96 m)	210 lb (95 kg)	Sr	St. John's College HS	Fort Washington, Maryland
G	33	Eddie Keith II	6 ft 5 in (1.96 m)	240 lb (109 kg)	Sr	Edgewater HS	Orlando, Florida
F	44	Alex Thomas	6 ft 9 in (2.06 m)	265 lb (120 kg)	Jr	Coastal Academy	Hawthorne, New Jersey

Head coach

- Pat Skerry (Tufts)

Assistant coach(es)

- Kevin Clark (Clark)
- Pat O'Connell (Johns Hopkins)
- Branden McDonald (Virginia Union)

Legend

- (C) Team captain
- (S) Suspended
- (I) Ineligible
- (W) Walk-on
- Injured
- Current redshirt

Roster
Last update: November 27, 2017

== Schedule and results ==
Date time, TV	Rank^{#}	Opponent^{#}	Result	Record	High points	High rebounds	High assists	Site (attendance) city, state
Exhibition
October 28, 2017*; 1:00 pm		Bucknell	W 93–86		21 – Tied	10 – Gorham	3 – Martin	SECU Arena (434); Towson, MD
Non-conference regular season
November 10, 2017*; 7:00 pm		at Old Dominion	L 54–57	0–1	22 – Martin	7 – 3 tied	3 – Tied	Ted Constant Convocation Center (6,279); Norfolk, VA
November 13, 2017*; 7:00 pm		Frostburg State	W 89–45	1–1	19 – Morman	9 – Gorham	3 – 3 tied	SECU Arena (1,175); Towson, MD
November 17, 2017*; 7:00 pm		at Loyola (MD); Battle for Greater Baltimore	W 95–72	2–1	21 – Starr	7 – Morman	6 – Starr	Reitz Arena (1,704); Baltimore, MD
November 20, 2017*; 7:30 pm		vs. Florida Atlantic; Gulf Coast Showcase quarterfinals	W 76–52	3–1	23 – Martin	5 – 4 tied	4 – Keith II	Germain Arena (823); Estero, FL
November 21, 2017*; 7:30 pm		vs. Penn; Gulf Coast Showcase semifinals	W 79–71	4–1	18 – Morsell	5 – Gorham	5 – Starr	Germain Arena (841); Estero, FL
November 22, 2017*; 7:30 pm		vs. Georgia Southern; Gulf Coast Showcase championship	W 70–67	5–1	16 – Morsell	9 – Gorham	2 – Tied	Germain Arena (868); Estero, FL
November 27, 2017*; 6:00 pm		St. Mary's (MD)	W 90–57	6–1	24 – Martin	6 – Thomas	2 – Tied	SECU Arena (878); Towson, MD
December 1, 2017*; 2:00 pm, CBSSN		vs. La Salle; Hall of Fame Belfast Classic semifinals	W 67–60	7–1	20 – Martin	6 – Keith II	4 – Starr	SSE Arena (5,256); Belfast, Northern Ireland
December 2, 2017*; 12:00 pm, CBSSN		vs. Manhattan; Hall of Fame Belfast Classic championship	W 56–55	8-1	20 – Martin	7 – Keith II	2 – Tied	SSE Arena (3,882); Belfast, Northern Ireland
December 6, 2017*; 7:00 pm		Morgan State; Battle for Greater Baltimore	W 82–78 ^{OT}	9–1	25 – Martin	9 – Gorham	4 – Starr	SECU Arena (2,456); Towson, MD
December 9, 2017*; 2:00 pm		UMBC; Battle for Greater Baltimore	W 78–54	10–1	15 – Martin	15 – Keith II	4 – Martin	SECU Arena (1,632); Towson, MD
December 20, 2017*; 7:00 pm, ESPN3		at Oakland	L 86–97	10–2	22 – Martin	7 – Thomas	3 – Morman	Athletics Center O'rena (2,422); Rochester, MI
December 22, 2017*; 7:00 pm, ACCN		at Pittsburgh	L 59-63	10-3	20 – Martin	8 – Gorham	1 – 4 tied	Petersen Events Center (3,126); Pittsburgh, PA
CAA regular season
December 30, 2017; 4:00 pm		at College of Charleston	L 62-73	10–4 (0–1)	20 – Keith II	5 – Tied	3 – Keith II	TD Arena (4,343); Charleston, SC
January 2, 2018; 7:00 pm		at Elon	L 72–75	10–5 (0–2)	27 – Martin	7 – Morsell	5 – Martin	Alumni Gym (1,309); Elon, NC
January 5, 2018; 7:00 pm		UNC Wilmington	W 89–71	11–5 (1–2)	24 – Morsell	10 – Gorham	4 – Starr	SECU Arena (1,251); Towson, MD
January 7, 2018; 2:00 pm		College of Charleston	W 73–62	12–5 (2–2)	16 – Martin	9 – Thomas	3 – 3 tied	SECU Arena (1,410); Towson, MD
January 11, 2018; 7:00 pm		Hofstra	L 73–76	12–6 (2–3)	20 – Gorham	5 – McNeil	5 – Keith	SECU Arena (1,257); Towson, MD
January 13, 2018; 4:00 pm		at William & Mary	W 99–73	13–6 (3–3)	20 – Martin	5 – Tied	4 – Martin	Kaplan Arena (3,958); Williamsburg, VA
January 18, 2018; 7:00 pm		Drexel	W 90–68	14–6 (4–3)	18 – Martin	8 – Tunstall	4 – Martin	SECU Arena (1,333); Towson, MD
January 20, 2018; 7:00 pm		at UNC Wilmington	L 71–73 ^{OT}	14–7 (4–4)	21 – Martin	7 – 4 tied	3 – Mormon	Trask Coliseum (4,405); Wilmington, NC
January 25, 2018; 7:00 pm		William & Mary	W 96–82 ^{OT}	15–7 (5–4)	35 – Martin	7 – Morsell	5 – Starr	SECU Arena (1,307); Towson, MD
January 27, 2018; 7:05 pm, CBSSN		Elon	L 76–83	15–8 (5–5)	32 – Martin	8 – Gorham	3 – Starr	SECU Arena (2,076); Towson, MD
February 1, 2018; 7:00 pm, NBCSN		at Delaware	W 75–71	16–8 (6–5)	21 – Gorham	12 – Gorham	6 – Martin	Bob Carpenter Center (2,828); Newark, DE
February 3, 2018; 4:00 pm		at James Madison	L 73–79	16–9 (6–6)	28 – Martin	17 – Gorham	2 – 3 tied	JMU Convocation Center (4,538); Harrisonburg, VA
February 8, 2018; 7:00 pm		at Drexel	W 94–92 ^{OT}	17–9 (7–6)	31 – Morsell	8 – Keith	4 – Martin	Daskalakis Athletic Center (825); Philadelphia, PA
February 10, 2018; 2:00 pm		Northeastern	L 62–77	17–10 (7–7)	21 – Martin	8 – Gorham	4 – Starr	SECU Arena (2,263); Towson, MD
February 15, 2018; 7:00 pm, CBSSN		Delaware	W 67–65	18–10 (8–7)	19 – Morsell	9 – Thomas	4 – McNeil	SECU Arena (2,022); Towson, MD
February 17, 2018; 2:00 pm		James Madison	L 66–69	18–11 (8–8)	21 – Martin	12 – Gorham	4 – Starr	SECU Arena (1,271); Towson, MD
February 22, 2018; 7:00 pm, NESN		at Northeastern	L 75–80	18–12 (8–9)	28 – Gorham	12 – Gorham	3 – Tied	Matthews Arena (960); Boston, MA
February 24, 2018; 4:00 pm, CBSSN		at Hofstra	L 86–91	18–13 (8–10)	36 – Martin	13 – Tunstall	6 – Martin	Mack Sports Complex (3,052); Hempstead, NY
CAA tournament
March 4, 2018; 2:30 pm, CAA.tv	(5)	vs. (4) William & Mary; Quarterfinals	L 66–80	18–14	18 – Martin	10 – Gorham	9 – Martin	North Charleston Coliseum (4,672); North Charleston, SC
*Non-conference game. ^{#}Rankings from AP. (#) Tournament seedings in parentheses. All times are in Eastern Time.

== See also ==
2017–18 Towson Tigers women's basketball team
