= 2017–18 Elon Phoenix men's basketball team =

American college basketball season

2017–18 Elon Phoenix men's basketball
- Conference: Colonial Athletic Association
- Record: 14–18 (6–12 CAA)
- Head coach: Matt Matheny (9th season)
- Assistant coaches: Jack Wooten; Monty Sanders; Chris Long
- Home arena: Alumni Gym

2017–18 CAA men's basketball standings
	Conf.				Overall
Team	W		L	PCT	W		L	PCT
College of Charleston †	14	–	4	.778	26	–	8	.765
Northeastern	14	–	4	.778	23	–	10	.697
Hofstra	12	–	6	.667	19	–	12	.613
William & Mary	11	–	7	.611	19	–	12	.613
Towson	8	–	10	.444	18	–	14	.563
UNC Wilmington	7	–	11	.389	11	–	21	.344
Delaware	6	–	12	.333	14	–	19	.424
Drexel	6	–	12	.333	13	–	20	.394
James Madison	6	–	12	.333	10	–	22	.313
Elon	6	–	12	.333	14	–	18	.438
† 2018 CAA tournament winner

The 2017–18 Elon Phoenix men's basketball team represented Elon University during the 2017–18 NCAA Division I men's basketball season. The Phoenix, led by ninth-year head coach Matt Matheny, played as fourth-year members of the Colonial Athletic Association in their final season playing their home games at Alumni Gym. They finished the season 14–18, 6–12 in CAA play to finish in a four-way tie for seventh place. They lost in the first round of the CAA tournament to Delaware.

This season marked Elon's final season playing at Alumni Gym, as they will open the new Schar Center for the 2018–19 school year.

== Previous season ==
The Phoenix finished the 2016–17 season 18–14, 10–8 in CAA play to finish in a tie for fourth place. As the No. 5 seed in the CAA tournament, they lost in the quarterfinals to William & Mary.

== Offseason ==
=== Departures ===
Name	Number	Pos.	Height	Weight	Year	Hometown	Reason for departure
Luke Eddy	1	G	6'0"	185	Senior	Charleston, WV	Graduated
Christian Hairston	12	G/F	6'7"	205	Senior	Greensboro, NC	Graduated
Ryder Bowline	25	G	6'4"	225	Senior	Cumming, GA	Walk-on; graduated
Patrick Ryan	42	G	6'6"	210	Senior	Darien, CT	Walk-on; graduated

=== 2017 recruiting class ===
College recruiting information
Name	Hometown	School	Height	Weight	Commit date
Duje Rada #116 PF	Meriden, NH	Kimball Union Academy	6 ft 9 in (2.06 m)	230 lb (100 kg)	Dec 12, 2016
Duje Rada #116 PF	Recruit ratings: Scout: Rivals: ESPN: (0)				
Simon Wright; SF	Minnetonka, MN	Hopkins High School	6 ft 7 in (2.01 m)	N/A	
Simon Wright; SF	Recruit ratings: Scout: Rivals: ESPN: (0)				
Nathan Priddy; PG	Argyle, TX	Argyle High School	6 ft 2 in (1.88 m)	185 lb (84 kg)	
Nathan Priddy; PG	Recruit ratings: Scout: Rivals: ESPN: (0)				
Overall recruit ranking:
Note: In many cases, Scout, Rivals, 247Sports, On3, and ESPN may conflict in their listings of height and weight.; In these cases, the average was taken. ESPN grades are on a 100-point scale.; Sources: "Elon". ESPN.; "2017 Team Ranking". Rivals.

== Roster ==
2017–18 Elon Phoenix men's basketball team
Players
Coaches

Pos.	#	Name	Height	Weight	Year	Previous school	Hometown
F	00	Brian Dawkins	6 ft 8 in (2.03 m)	240 lb (109 kg)	RS Sr	Bishop Kenny HS	Jacksonville, Florida
F/C	1	Duje Radja	6 ft 8 in (2.03 m)	235 lb (107 kg)	Fr	Kimball Union Academy	Split, Croatia
G	2	Dmitri Thompson	6 ft 4 in (1.93 m)	205 lb (93 kg)	Sr	Orlando Christian Prep	Orlando, Florida
G	3	Seth Fuller	5 ft 11 in (1.8 m)	180 lb (82 kg)	RS Fr	Dublin Coffman HS	Dublin, Ohio
G/F	4	Collin Luther	6 ft 6 in (1.98 m)	220 lb (100 kg)	Sr	Hampton HS (PA)	Pittsburgh, Pennsylvania
F/C	10	Karolis Kundrotas	6 ft 11 in (2.11 m)	240 lb (109 kg)	Jr	Barking Abbey School	Kaunas, Lithuania
G	11	Maxwell Chester (W)	6 ft 1 in (1.85 m)	190 lb (86 kg)	RS Fr	Woodward Academy	Atlanta, Georgia
G	12	Nathan Priddy	6 ft 2 in (1.88 m)	185 lb (84 kg)	Fr	Argyle HS	Argyle, Texas
G	13	Dainan Swoope	6 ft 0 in (1.83 m)	185 lb (84 kg)	Jr	Sunrise Christian Academy	Overland Park, Kansas
F	14	Jack Anton	6 ft 8 in (2.03 m)	235 lb (107 kg)	Sr	Archbishop Moeller HS	Mason, Ohio
G	15	Christian Scott	6 ft 1 in (1.85 m)	170 lb (77 kg)	Fr	St. Andrew's Episcopal School (MS)	New Orleans, Louisiana
G	20	Sheldon Eberhardt	6 ft 5 in (1.96 m)	190 lb (86 kg)	Jr	Middle Creek HS	Apex, North Carolina
F	21	Jack George	6 ft 10 in (2.08 m)	220 lb (100 kg)	Sr	Carmel Catholic HS (IL)	Libertyville, Illinois
G	22	Steven Santa Ana	6 ft 4 in (1.93 m)	190 lb (86 kg)	Jr	Ardrey Kell HS	Charlotte, North Carolina
F	33	Simon Wright	6 ft 7 in (2.01 m)	215 lb (98 kg)	Fr	Hopkins HS	Minneapolis, Minnesota
F	41	Tyler Seibring	6 ft 9 in (2.06 m)	225 lb (102 kg)	Jr	Normal Community HS	Normal, Illinois

Head coach

- Matt Matheny (Davidson)

Assistant coach(es)

- Jack Wooten (North Carolina)
- Monty Sanders (Elon)
- Chris Long (Elon)

Legend

- (C) Team captain
- (S) Suspended
- (I) Ineligible
- (W) Walk-on
- Injured
- Current redshirt

Roster
Last update: December 6, 2017

== Schedule and results ==
Date time, TV	Rank^{#}	Opponent^{#}	Result	Record	Site (attendance) city, state
Exhibition
Nov 1, 2017*; 7:00 pm		Randolph	W 99–63		Alumni Gym; Elon, NC
Non-conference regular season
Nov 10, 2017*; 7:00 pm, ACCN Extra		at No. 1 Duke	L 68–97	0–1	Cameron Indoor Stadium (9,314); Durham, NC
Nov 11, 2017*; 7:00 pm		William Peace	W 76–53	1–1	Alumni Gym (1,386); Elon, NC
Nov 14, 2017*; 7:00 pm, ESPN3		at Furman	L 67–76	1–2	Timmons Arena (1,531); Greenville, SC
Nov 17, 2017*; 6:30 pm		vs. FIU; Black & Gold Shootout	W 95–87 ^{3OT}	2–2	UW–Milwaukee Panther Arena (1,686); Milwaukee, WI
Nov 18, 2017*; 4:00 pm		vs. Concorida–St. Paul; Black & Gold Shootout	W 84–62	3–2	UW–Milwaukee Panther Arena (1,313); Milwaukee, WI
Nov 19, 2017*; 4:30 pm		at Milwaukee; Black & Gold Shootout	L 71–72	3–3	UW–Milwaukee Panther Arena (1,013); Milwaukee, WI
Nov 22, 2017*; 7:00 pm		Radford	W 77–74	4–3	Alumni Gym (1,490); Elon, NC
Nov 30, 2017*; 7:00 pm		South Florida	W 79–78 ^{OT}	5–3	Alumni Gym (1,534); Elon, NC
Dec 2, 2017*; 7:00 pm		Saint Peter's	W 71–65 ^{OT}	6–3	Alumni Gym (1,386); Elon, NC
Dec 7, 2017*; 7:00 pm, ESPN3		at UNC Greensboro	L 44–75	6–4	Greensboro Coliseum (2,446); Greensboro, NC
Dec 17, 2017*; 1:00 pm		at Boston University	W 77–69	7–4	Case Gym (565); Boston, MA
Dec 19, 2017*; 7:00 pm, ESPN3		at Canisius	L 51–67	7–5	Koessler Athletic Center (805); Buffalo, NY
Dec 22, 2017*; 6:00 pm, ESPN3		at Indiana State	W 73–68	8–5	Hulman Center (2,979); Terre Haute, IN
CAA regular season
Dec 30, 2017; 2:00 pm		Drexel	W 90–75	9–5 (1–0)	Alumni Gym (1,607); Elon, NC
Jan 2, 2018; 7:00 pm		Towson	W 75–72	10–5 (2–0)	Alumni Gym (1,309); Elon, NC
Jan 5, 2018; 7:00 pm		at Northeastern	L 60–72	10–6 (2–1)	Matthews Arena (2,259); Boston, MA
Jan 7, 2018; 4:00 pm		at Hofstra	W 89–76	11–6 (3–1)	Mack Sports Complex (2,012); Hempstead, NY
Jan 11, 2018; 7:00 pm		UNC Wilmington	L 78–80	11–7 (3–2)	Alumni Gym (1,833); Elon, NC
Jan 13, 2018; 7:00 pm		College of Charleston	W 63–58	12–7 (4–2)	Alumni Gym (1,855); Elon, NC
Jan 18, 2018; 7:00 pm		at James Madison	L 74–85	12–8 (4–3)	JMU Convocation Center (2,190); Harrisonburg, VA
Jan 20, 2018; 7:00 pm		William & Mary	L 73–80	12–9 (4–4)	Alumni Gym (1,647); Elon, NC
Jan 25, 2018; 7:00 pm		at Drexel	L 79–83	12–10 (4–5)	Daskalakis Athletic Center (843); Philadelphia, PA
Jan 27, 2018; 2:00 pm		at Towson	W 83–76	13–10 (5–5)	SECU Arena (2,076); Towson, MD
Feb 1, 2018; 7:00 pm		at William & Mary	L 92–99	13–11 (5–6)	Kaplan Arena (3,508); Williamsburg, VA
Feb 3, 2018; 7:00 pm		Delaware	W 89–76	14–11 (6–6)	Alumni Gym (1,719); Elon, NC
Feb 8, 2018; 7:00 pm		Hofstra	L 48–67	14–12 (6–7)	Alumni Gym (1,553); Elon, NC
Feb 15, 2018; 7:00 pm		at UNC Wilmington	L 63–87	14–13 (6–8)	Trask Coliseum (4,173); Wilmington, NC
Feb 17, 2018; 7:00 pm		at Delaware	L 57–72	14–14 (6–9)	Bob Carpenter Center (2,547); Newark, DE
Feb 22, 2018; 7:00 pm		at College of Charleston	L 58–79	14–15 (6–10)	TD Arena (4,745); Charleston, SC
Feb 24, 2018; 7:00 pm		Northeastern	L 59–81	14–16 (6–11)	Alumni Gym (1,847); Elon, NC
Feb 26, 2018; 7:00 pm		James Madison	L 84–90	14–17 (6–12)	Alumni Gym (1,591); Elon, NC
CAA tournament
Mar 3, 2018; 6:30 pm	(10)	vs. (7) Delaware; First round	L 79–86	14–18	North Charleston Coliseum (2,659); North Charleston, SC
*Non-conference game. ^{#}Rankings from AP Poll. (#) Tournament seedings in parentheses. All times are in Eastern Time.

== See also ==
- 2017–18 Elon Phoenix women's basketball team
