= 2017–18 James Madison Dukes men's basketball team =

American college basketball season

2017–18 James Madison Dukes men's basketball
- Conference: Colonial Athletic Association
- Record: 10–22 (6–12 CAA)
- Head coach: Louis Rowe (2nd season)
- Assistant coaches: Byron Taylor; Rob Summers; Tim Johnson
- Home arena: JMU Convocation Center

2017–18 CAA men's basketball standings
| | Conf. | | | | Overall |
| Team | W | | L | PCT | W | | L | PCT |
|---|---|---|---|---|---|---|---|---|
| College of Charleston † | 14 | – | 4 | .778 | 26 | – | 8 | .765 |
| Northeastern | 14 | – | 4 | .778 | 23 | – | 10 | .697 |
| Hofstra | 12 | – | 6 | .667 | 19 | – | 12 | .613 |
| William & Mary | 11 | – | 7 | .611 | 19 | – | 12 | .613 |
| Towson | 8 | – | 10 | .444 | 18 | – | 14 | .563 |
| UNC Wilmington | 7 | – | 11 | .389 | 11 | – | 21 | .344 |
| Delaware | 6 | – | 12 | .333 | 14 | – | 19 | .424 |
| Drexel | 6 | – | 12 | .333 | 13 | – | 20 | .394 |
| James Madison | 6 | – | 12 | .333 | 10 | – | 22 | .313 |
| Elon | 6 | – | 12 | .333 | 14 | – | 18 | .438 |
† 2018 CAA tournament winner

The 2017–18 James Madison Dukes men's basketball team represented James Madison University during the 2017–18 NCAA Division I men's basketball season. The Dukes, led by second-year head coach Louis Rowe, played their home games at the James Madison University Convocation Center in Harrisonburg, Virginia as members of the Colonial Athletic Association (CAA). They finished the season 10–22, 6–12 in CAA play, to finish in a four-way tie for seventh place. They lost in the first round of the CAA tournament to Drexel.

== Previous season ==
The Dukes finished the 2016–17 season 10–23, 7–11 record in CAA play, to finish in a tie for third place. The Dukes lost in the quarterfinals of CAA tournament to College of Charleston. The season was the first for head coach Louis Rowe.

== Offseason ==
=== Departures ===
| Name | Number | Pos. | Height | Weight | Year | Hometown | Notes |
|---|---|---|---|---|---|---|---|
| Shakir Brown | 1 | G/F | 6'6" | 225 | Senior | Baltimore, MD | Graduated |
| Jackson Kent | 10 | G | 6'7" | 200 | Senior | High Point, NC | Graduated |
| Terrence Johnson | 11 | G | 6'4" | 195 | Sophomore | Tucson, AZ | Decided to leave program |
| Vince Holmes | 12 | G | 6'4" | 185 | Sophomore | Jupiter, FL | Decided to leave program |
| Paulius Satkus | 13 | F | 6'8" | 230 | Senior | Raudondvaris, Lithuania | Graduated |
| Tyriq Nady | 14 | G | 5'10" | 195 | Freshman | Virginia Beach, VA | |
| Tom Vodanovich | 15 | F | 6'7" | 220 | Senior | Wellington, New Zealand | Graduated |
| Dimitrije Cabarkapa | 21 | F | 6'10" | 240 | RS senior | Novi Sad, Serbia | Graduated |
| Yohanny Dalembert | 40 | F | 6'8" | 240 | Senior | Port-au-Prince, Haiti | Graduated |
| Ivan Lukic | 55 | F | 6'9" | 230 | Senior | Loznica, Serbia | Graduated |

=== Incoming transfers ===
| Name | Number | Pos. | Height | Weight | Year | Hometown | Previous school |
|---|---|---|---|---|---|---|---|
| Antanee Pinkard | 2 | G | 6'4" | 195 | Sophomore | Lancaster, PA | Transferred from Hill College (JC) |
| Develle Phillips | 12 | F | 6'9" | 210 | Junior | Bowie, MD | Transferred from Odessa College (JC) |
| Cameron Smith | 21 | F | 6'7" | 210 | Graduate | Tallahassee, FL | Graduate transfer from Florida International |

=== 2017 recruiting class ===
| Name | Number | Pos. | Height | Weight | Hometown | High school |
|---|---|---|---|---|---|---|
| Matt Lewis | 1 | G | 6'5" | 180 | Arlington, VA | Bishop O'Connell |
| Darius Banks | 5 | G | 6'5" | 225 | St. Petersburg, FL | St. Petersburg |
| Greg Jones | 10 | F | 6'7" | 220 | Richmond, VA | John Marshall |
| Zach Jacobs | 11 | F | 6'8" | 220 | Richmond, VA | Trinity Episcopal |
| Dwight Wilson | 24 | F | 6'7" | 260 | Tallahassee, FL | Lincoln |
| Alex Schulz | 33 | F | 6'11" | 265 | Herndon, VA | Oakton |

== Roster ==
2017–18 James Madison Dukes men's basketball team
Players
Coaches

| Pos. | # | Name | Height | Weight | Year | Previous school | Hometown |
|---|---|---|---|---|---|---|---|
| G | 1 | Matt Lewis | 6 ft 5 in (1.96 m) | 180 lb (82 kg) | Fr | Bishop O'Connell HS | Arlington, VA |
| G | 2 | Antanee Pinkard | 6 ft 4 in (1.93 m) | 195 lb (88 kg) | So | Hill College | Lancaster, PA |
| G | 3 | Stuckey Mosley | 6 ft 3 in (1.91 m) | 190 lb (86 kg) | RS Jr | Toledo | Orlando, FL |
| G | 4 | Joey McLean | 6 ft 0 in (1.83 m) | 150 lb (68 kg) | Sr | High Point Christian | Greensboro, NC |
| G | 5 | Darius Banks | 6 ft 5 in (1.96 m) | 225 lb (102 kg) | Fr | St. Petersburg HS | St. Petersburg, FL |
| F | 10 | Greg Jones | 6 ft 7 in (2.01 m) | 220 lb (100 kg) | Fr | John Marshall HS | Richmond, VA |
| F | 11 | Zach Jacobs | 6 ft 8 in (2.03 m) | 220 lb (100 kg) | Fr | Trinity Episcopal | Richmond, VA |
| F | 12 | Develle Phillips | 6 ft 9 in (2.06 m) | 210 lb (95 kg) | Jr | Odessa College | Bowie, MD |
| F | 21 | Cameron Smith | 6 ft 7 in (2.01 m) | 210 lb (95 kg) | Sr | Florida International | Tallahassee, FL |
| F | 22 | Gerron Scissum | 6 ft 8 in (2.03 m) | 205 lb (93 kg) | RS So | VCU | Huntsville, AL |
| F | 23 | Ramone Snowden | 6 ft 6 in (1.98 m) | 230 lb (104 kg) | RS Sr | Niagara | Virginia Beach, VA |
| F | 24 | Dwight Wilson | 6 ft 7 in (2.01 m) | 260 lb (118 kg) | Fr | Lincoln HS | Tallahassee, FL |
| F | 33 | Alex Schulz | 6 ft 11 in (2.11 m) | 265 lb (120 kg) | Fr | Oakton HS | Herndon, VA |

Head coach

- Louis Rowe (James Madison)

Assistant coach(es)

- Byron Taylor (Florida A&M)
- Rob Summers (West Virginia)
- Tim Johnson (Wofford)

Legend

- (C) Team captain
- (S) Suspended
- (I) Ineligible
- (W) Walk-on
- Injured
- Current redshirt

Roster
Last update: August 7, 2024

== Schedule and results ==
| Date time, TV | Rank^{#} | Opponent^{#} | Result | Record | Site (attendance) city, state |
Non-conference regular season
| November 10, 2017*; 5:00 p.m. | | Bridgewater (VA) | W 80–50 | 1–0 | JMU Convocation Center (4,598); Harrisonburg, VA |
| November 13, 2017*; 7:00 p.m. | | Old Dominion; Rivalry | L 53–69 | 1–1 | JMU Convocation Center (2,451); Harrisonburg, VA |
| November 17, 2017*; 5:00 p.m. | | vs. Northern Kentucky; The Islands of the Bahamas Showcase quarterfinals | L 78–87 | 1–2 | Kendal Isaacs National Gymnasium (316); Nassau, Bahamas |
| November 18, 2017*; 2:00 p.m. | | vs. Weber State; The Islands of the Bahamas Showcase consolation round | L 65–73 | 1–3 | Kendal Isaacs National Gymnasium (264); Nassau, Bahamas |
| Nov. 19, 2017*; 11:00 a.m. | | vs. UTSA; The Islands of the Bahamas Showcase 7th-place game | L 77–90 | 1–4 | Kendal Isaacs National Gymnasium (201); Nassau, Bahamas |
| November 22, 2017*; 4:00 p.m. | | Appalachian State | W 105–99 ^{2OT} | 2–4 | JMU Convocation Center (2,062); Harrisonburg, VA |
| November 25, 2017*; 4:00 p.m. | | at Radford | L 68–69 | 2–5 | Dedmon Center (1,314); Radford, VA |
| November 29, 2017*; 7:00 p.m. | | George Mason | L 72–76 | 2–6 | JMU Convocation Center (2,965); Harrisonburg, VA |
| December 2, 2017*; 8:00 p.m. | | Charlotte | W 87–82 | 3–6 | JMU Convocation Center (2,439); Harrisonburg, VA |
| December 5, 2017*; 6:00 p.m., ESPN3 | | at The Citadel | L 82–84 | 3–7 | McAlister Field House (744); Charleston, SC |
| December 10, 2017*; 2:00 p.m. | | at Richmond | L 71–74 | 3–8 | Robins Center (6,524); Richmond, VA |
| December 16, 2017*; 5:30 p.m. | | at FIU | W 76–67 | 4–8 | FIU Arena (620); Miami, FL |
| December 20, 2017*; 7:00 p.m., SECN | | at Florida | L 63–72 | 4–9 | O'Connell Center (8,203); Gainesville, FL |
Exhibition
| December 27, 2017*; 2:00 p.m. | | West Virginia Wesleyan | W 75–49 | | JMU Convocation Center; Harrisonburg, VA |
CAA regular season
| December 30, 2017; 4:00 p.m. | | Northeastern | L 70–81 | 4–10 (0–1) | JMU Convocation Center (2,308); Harrisonburg, VA |
| January 2, 2018; 7:00 p.m. | | William & Mary | L 76–84 | 4–11 (0–2) | JMU Convocation Center (2,050); Harrisonburg, VA |
| January 5, 2018; 7:00 p.m. | | at Hofstra | L 81–87 | 4–12 (0–3) | Mack Sports Complex (1,062); Hempstead, NY |
| January 7, 2018; 2:00 p.m. | | at Northeastern | L 67–80 | 4–13 (0–4) | Matthews Arena (782); Boston, MA |
| January 11, 2018; 7:00 p.m. | | at William & Mary | L 89–92 ^{OT} | 4–14 (0–5) | Kaplan Arena (3,673); Williamsburg, VA |
| January 13, 2018; 4:00 p.m. | | Delaware | L 60–61 | 4–15 (0–6) | JMU Convocation Center (2,938); Harrisonburg, VA |
| January 18, 2018; 7:00 p.m. | | Elon | W 85–74 | 5–15 (1–6) | JMU Convocation Center (2,190); Harrisonburg, VA |
| January 20, 2018; 4:00 p.m. | | Drexel | W 75–73 | 6–15 (2–6) | JMU Convocation Center (2,611); Harrisonburg, VA |
| January 25, 2018; 7:00 p.m. | | at UNC Wilmington | L 68–71 | 6–16 (2–7) | Trask Coliseum (3,988); Wilmington, NC |
| January 27, 2018; 3:00 p.m. | | at College of Charleston | L 59–66 | 6–17 (2–8) | TD Arena (4,030); Charleston, SC |
| February 1, 2018; 7:00 p.m. | | at Drexel | L 74–76 | 6–18 (2–9) | Daskalakis Athletic Center (705); Philadelphia, PA |
| February 3, 2018; 4:00 p.m. | | Towson | W 79–73 | 7–18 (3–9) | JMU Convocation Center (4,538); Harrisonburg, VA |
| February 13, 2018; 7:00 p.m. | | UNC Wilmington | W 62–61 | 8–18 (4–9) | JMU Convocation Center (1,038); Harrisonburg, VA |
| February 15, 2018; 7:00 p.m. | | College of Charleston | L 79–81 ^{OT} | 8–19 (4–10) | JMU Convocation Center (2,454); Harrisonburg, VA |
| February 17, 2018; 2:00 p.m. | | at Towson | W 69–66 | 9–19 (5–10) | SECU Arena (1,271); Towson, MD |
| February 22, 2018; 7:00 p.m. | | Hofstra | L 61–77 | 9–20 (5–11) | JMU Convocation Center (2,663); Harrisonburg, VA |
| February 24, 2018; 4:00 p.m. | | at Delaware | L 66–68 | 9–21 (5–12) | Bob Carpenter Center (3,487); Newark, DE |
| February 26, 2018; 7:00 p.m. | | at Elon | W 90–84 | 10–21 (6–12) | Alumni Gym (1,591); Elon, NC |
CAA tournament
| March 3, 2018; 4:00 p.m. | (9) | vs. (8) Drexel; First round | L 62–70 | 10–22 | North Charleston Coliseum (2,659); North Charleston, SC |
*Non-conference game. ^{#}Rankings from AP poll. (#) Tournament seedings in parentheses. All times are in Eastern.
