= 2017–18 Delaware Fightin' Blue Hens men's basketball team =

American college basketball season

2017–18 Delaware Fightin' Blue Hens men's basketball
- Conference: Colonial Athletic Association
- Record: 14–19 (6–12 CAA)
- Head coach: Martin Ingelsby (2nd season)
- Assistant coaches: Bill Phillips; Corey McCrae; Torrian Jones
- Home arena: Bob Carpenter Center

2017–18 CAA men's basketball standings
| | Conf. | | | | Overall |
| Team | W | | L | PCT | W | | L | PCT |
|---|---|---|---|---|---|---|---|---|
| College of Charleston † | 14 | – | 4 | .778 | 26 | – | 8 | .765 |
| Northeastern | 14 | – | 4 | .778 | 23 | – | 10 | .697 |
| Hofstra | 12 | – | 6 | .667 | 19 | – | 12 | .613 |
| William & Mary | 11 | – | 7 | .611 | 19 | – | 12 | .613 |
| Towson | 8 | – | 10 | .444 | 18 | – | 14 | .563 |
| UNC Wilmington | 7 | – | 11 | .389 | 11 | – | 21 | .344 |
| Delaware | 6 | – | 12 | .333 | 14 | – | 19 | .424 |
| Drexel | 6 | – | 12 | .333 | 13 | – | 20 | .394 |
| James Madison | 6 | – | 12 | .333 | 10 | – | 22 | .313 |
| Elon | 6 | – | 12 | .333 | 14 | – | 18 | .438 |
† 2018 CAA tournament winner

The 2017–18 Delaware Fightin' Blue Hens men's basketball team represented the University of Delaware during the 2017–18 NCAA Division I men's basketball season. The Fightin' Blue Hens, led by second-year head coach Martin Ingelsby, played their home games at the Bob Carpenter Center in Newark, Delaware as members of the Colonial Athletic Association. They finished the season 14–19, 6–12 in CAA play to finish in a four-way tie for seventh place. They defeated Elon in the first round of the CAA tournament before losing in the quarterfinals to Northeastern.

== Previous season ==
The Fightin' Blue Hens finished the 2016–17 season 13–20, 5–13 in CAA play to finish in ninth place. They defeated Hofstra in the first round of the CAA tournament to advance to the quarterfinals where they lost to UNC Wilmington.

== Offseason ==
=== Departures ===
| Name | Number | Pos. | Height | Weight | Year | Hometown | Reason for departure |
|---|---|---|---|---|---|---|---|
| Chivarsky Corbett | 1 | G/F | 6'7" | 195 | RS Sophomore | Tampa, FL | Graduate transferred to Bellarmine |
| Barnett Harris | 2 | F | 6'9" | 215 | Senior | Monroeville, PA | Graduated |
| Curtis McRoy | 10 | G | 6'2" | 170 | Senior | Annapolis, MD | Graduated |
| Devonne Pinkard | 11 | G/F | 6'6" | 200 | Senior | Lancaster, PA | Graduated |

=== Incoming transfers ===
| Name | Number | Pos. | Height | Weight | Year | Hometown | Previous School |
|---|---|---|---|---|---|---|---|
| Collin Goss | 35 | F | 6'11" | 227 | Junior | Manassas, VA | Transferred from George Washington. Under NCAA transfer rules, Goss will sit out the 2017–18 season and will have three years of remaining eligibility. |

=== Recruiting class of 2017 ===
College recruiting
| Name | Hometown | School | Height | Weight | Commit date |
|---|---|---|---|---|---|
| Ryan Allen #87 SG | Bowie, MD | DeMatha Catholic High School | 6 ft 2 in (1.88 m) | 185 lb (84 kg) | Sep 12, 2016 |
| Ryan Allen #87 SG | Recruit ratings: (67) | | | | |
| Chyree Walker #81 SF | Fairfax, VA | Bullis School | 6 ft 4 in (1.93 m) | 190 lb (86 kg) | Sep 20, 2016 |
| Chyree Walker #81 SF | Recruit ratings: (65) | | | | |
| Kevin Anderson #98 SG | Williamsport, PA | Saint John Neumann High School | 6 ft 3 in (1.91 m) | 170 lb (77 kg) | Oct 23, 2016 |
| Kevin Anderson #98 SG | Recruit ratings: (64) | | | | |
Overall recruit ranking:
Note: In many cases, Scout, Rivals, 247Sports, On3, and ESPN may conflict in their listings of height and weight.; In these cases, the average was taken. ESPN grades are on a 100-point scale.; Sources: "2017 Team Ranking". Rivals.

=== Recruiting class of 2018 ===
College recruiting (2018)
| Name | Hometown | School | Height | Weight | Commit date |
|---|---|---|---|---|---|
| Ithiel Horton; PG | Jersey City, NJ | Roselle Catholic High School | 6 ft 3 in (1.91 m) | 180 lb (82 kg) | Sep 18, 2017 |
| Ithiel Horton; PG | Recruit ratings: No ratings found | | | | |
Overall recruit ranking:
Note: In many cases, Scout, Rivals, 247Sports, On3, and ESPN may conflict in their listings of height and weight.; In these cases, the average was taken. ESPN grades are on a 100-point scale.; Sources: "2018 Team Ranking". Rivals.

== Roster ==
2017–18 Delaware Fightin' Blue Hens men's basketball team
Players
Coaches

| Pos. | # | Name | Height | Weight | Year | Previous school | Hometown |
|---|---|---|---|---|---|---|---|
| G | 0 | Ryan Daly | 6 ft 5 in (1.96 m) | 225 lb (102 kg) | So | Archbishop John Carroll High School | Ardmore, Pennsylvania |
| G | 1 | Kevin Anderson | 6 ft 5 in (1.96 m) | 180 lb (82 kg) | Fr | St. John Neumann High School | Williamsport, Pennsylvania |
| G | 2 | Ryan Allen | 6 ft 2 in (1.88 m) | 195 lb (88 kg) | Fr | DeMatha Catholic High School | Bowie, Maryland |
| G | 3 | Anthony Mosley | 6 ft 1 in (1.85 m) | 180 lb (82 kg) | Sr | Sanford School | Wilmington, Delaware |
| G | 4 | Darian Bryant | 6 ft 4 in (1.93 m) | 220 lb (100 kg) | RS Jr | George Washington | Bowie, Maryland |
| F | 5 | Eric Carter | 6 ft 9 in (2.06 m) | 235 lb (107 kg) | RS Jr | Jackson Memorial High School | Jackson, New Jersey |
| G | 10 | Connor Rufo (W) | 6 ft 3 in (1.91 m) | 190 lb (86 kg) | Fr | Sanford School | Hockessin, Delaware |
| F | 11 | Chyree Walker | 6 ft 5 in (1.96 m) | 195 lb (88 kg) | Fr | Bullis School | Fairfax, Virginia |
| G | 15 | Curtis Lochner (W) | 5 ft 10 in (1.78 m) | 175 lb (79 kg) | Jr | Abington Senior High School | Willow Grove, Pennsylvania |
| F | 20 | Derrick Woods | 6 ft 8 in (2.03 m) | 240 lb (109 kg) | RS So | St. Bonaventure | Trenton, New Jersey |
| F | 22 | Jacob Cushing | 6 ft 8 in (2.03 m) | 210 lb (95 kg) | So | Neuqua Valley High School | Naperville, Illinois |
| F | 23 | Skye Johnson | 6 ft 8 in (2.03 m) | 250 lb (113 kg) | Sr | Virginia Episcopal School | Dumfries, Virginia |
| F | 35 | Collin Goss (redshirt) | 6 ft 11 in (2.11 m) | 225 lb (102 kg) | Jr | George Washington | Manassas, Virginia |

Head coach

- Martin Ingelsby (Notre Dame)

Assistant coach(es)

- Bill Phillips (St. Joseph's)
- Corey McCrae (Fordham)
- Torrian Jones (Notre Dame)

Legend

- (C) Team captain
- (S) Suspended
- (I) Ineligible
- (W) Walk-on
- Injured
- Current redshirt

Roster

== Schedule and results ==
| Date time, TV | Rank^{#} | Opponent^{#} | Result | Record | High points | High rebounds | High assists | Site (attendance) city, state |
Non-conference regular season
| Nov 10, 2017*; 7:00 pm, NBCSP+ | | at Richmond | W 76–63 | 1–0 | 22 – Daly | 12 – Carter | 5 – Mosley | Robins Center (7,201); Richmond, VA |
| Nov 14, 2017*; 8:00 pm | | at Bradley | L 53–61 | 1–1 | 18 – Carter | 12 – Carter | 2 – Tied | Carver Arena (4,556); Peoria, IL |
| Nov 17, 2017*; 7:00 pm | | Wesley; UNCG Spartan Classic | W 93–78 | 2–1 | 23 – Daly | 9 – Daly | 6 – Anderson | Bob Carpenter Center (2,880); Newark, DE |
| Nov 20, 2017*; 7:00 pm | | at UNC Greensboro; UNCG Spartan Classic | L 66–79 | 2–2 | 17 – Anderson | 6 – Daly | 2 – Allen | Greensboro Coliseum (2,249); Greensboro, NC |
| Nov 21, 2017*; 4:30 pm | | vs. North Carolina Wesleyan; UNCG Spartan Classic | W 88–70 | 3–2 | 19 – Woods | 10 – Woods | 4 – Allen | Greensboro Coliseum (1,635); Greensboro, NC |
| Nov 22, 2017*; 3:30 pm | | vs. Longwood; UNCG Spartan Classic | W 65–57 | 4–2 | 19 – Allen | 9 – Woods | 3 – Tied | Fleming Gymnasium (93); Greensboro, NC |
| Nov 27, 2017*; 7:00 pm | | Yale | L 66–76 | 4–3 | 23 – Mosley | 10 – Woods | 3 – Bryant | Bob Carpenter Center (2,119); Newark, DE |
| Dec 1, 2017*; 7:00 pm | | at Navy | L 76–82 | 4–4 | 23 – Daly | 6 – Tied | 5 – Mosley | Alumni Hall (535); Annapolis, MD |
| Dec 6, 2017*; 7:00 pm | | Buffalo | L 72–75 | 4–5 | 22 – Daly | 11 – Carter | 5 – Anderson | Bob Carpenter Center (2,326); Newark, DE |
| Dec 9, 2017*; 7:00 pm, CBSSN | | No. 9 Notre Dame | L 68–92 | 4–6 | 23 – Anderson | 9 – Carter | 7 – Anderson | Bob Carpenter Center (4,737); Newark, DE |
| Dec 17, 2017*; 8:00 pm | | at Delaware State | W 68–59 ^{OT} | 5–6 | 15 – Allen | 12 – Anderson | 8 – Daly | Memorial Hall (527); Dover, DE |
| Dec 20, 2017*; 7:00 pm | | Cal State Bakersfield | W 76–62 | 6–6 | 22 – Anderson | 10 – Carter | 5 – Daly | Bob Carpenter Center (1,922); Newark, DE |
| Dec 28, 2017*; 2:00 pm | | Cornell | W 97–96 ^{OT} | 7–6 | 24 – Allen | 12 – Carter | 7 – Mosley | Bob Carpenter Center (2,450); Newark, DE |
CAA regular season
| Dec 30, 2017; 7:00 pm | | at UNC Wilmington | W 58–56 | 8–6 (1–0) | 14 – Allen | 10 – Carter | 4 – Mosley | Trask Coliseum (3,931); Wilmington, NC |
| Jan 2, 2018; 7:00 pm | | at College of Charleston | L 78–93 | 8–7 (1–1) | 23 – Carter | 8 – Carter | 3 – Mosley | TD Arena (2,894); Charleston, SC |
| Jan 5, 2018; 7:00 pm | | William & Mary | L 65–90 | 8–8 (1–2) | 21 – Daly | 9 – Carter | 3 – Walker | Bob Carpenter Center (2,208); Newark, DE |
| Jan 7, 2018; 2:00 pm | | UNC Wilmington | W 96–76 | 9–8 (2–2) | 27 – Daly | 8 – Mosley | 8 – Mosley | Bob Carpenter Center (2,388); Newark, DE |
| Jan 11, 2018; 7:00 pm, NBCSP | | Drexel | W 72–66 | 10–8 (3–2) | 17 – Carter | 13 – Carter | 5 – Tied | Bob Carpenter Center (1,948); Newark, DE |
| Jan 13, 2018; 4:00 pm | | at James Madison | W 61–60 | 11–8 (4–2) | 19 – Daly | 13 – Carter | 6 – Mosley | JMU Convocation Center (2,938); Williamsburg, VA |
| Jan 18, 2018; 7:00 pm | | at Hofstra | L 63–90 | 11–9 (4–3) | 16 – Allen | 8 – Daly | 2 – Tied | Mack Sports Complex (1,514); Hempstead, NY |
| Jan 20, 2018; 2:00 pm | | at Northeastern | L 64–76 | 11–10 (4–4) | 16 – Tied | 9 – Daly | 3 – Allen | Matthews Arena (901); Boston, MA |
| Jan 25, 2018; 7:00 pm | | College of Charleston | L 54–62 | 11–11 (4–5) | 19 – Allen | 9 – Carter | 2 – Mosley | Bob Carpenter Center (2,350); Newark, DE |
| Jan 27, 2018; 7:00 pm | | Hofstra | L 59–64 | 11–12 (4–6) | 16 – Carter | 12 – Carter | 4 – Carter | Bob Carpenter Center (4,737); Newark, DE |
| Feb 1, 2018; 7:00 pm, NBCSP+ | | Towson | L 71–75 | 11–13 (4–7) | 22 – Allen | 9 – Johnson | 4 – Allen | Bob Carpenter Center (2,828); Newark, DE |
| Feb 3, 2018; 7:00 pm | | at Elon | L 76–89 | 11–14 (4–8) | 26 – Allen | 13 – Carter | 3 – Mosley | Alumni Gym (1,719); Elon, NC |
| Feb 8, 2018; 7:00 pm | | Northeastern | L 67–70 | 11–15 (4–9) | 19 – Allen | 10 – Carter | 3 – Mosley | Bob Carpenter Center (2,368); Newark, DE |
| Feb 10, 2018; 2:00 pm | | at William & Mary | L 66–83 | 11–16 (4–10) | 25 – Allen | 10 – Johnson | 3 – Carter | Kaplan Arena (5,825); Williamsburg, VA |
| Feb 15, 2018; 7:00 pm | | at Towson | L 65–67 | 11–17 (4–11) | 18 – Tied | 9 – Carter | 3 – Tied | SECU Arena (2,022); Towson, MD |
| Feb 17, 2018; 7:00 pm, NBCSP | | Elon | W 72–57 | 12–17 (5–11) | 22 – Daly | 12 – Daly | 3 – Tied | Bob Carpenter Center (2,547); Newark, DE |
| Feb 22, 2018; 7:00 pm | | at Drexel | L 83–85 | 12–18 (5–12) | 21 – Allen | 12 – Carter | 6 – Mosley | Daskalakis Athletic Center (1,116); Philadelphia, PA |
| Feb 24, 2018; 4:00 pm | | James Madison | W 68–66 | 13–18 (6–12) | 14 – Daly | 11 – Carter | 4 – Tied | Bob Carpenter Center (3,487); Newark, DE |
CAA tournament
| Mar 3, 2018; 6:30 pm | (7) | vs. (10) Elon; First round | W 86–79 | 14–18 | 23 – Daly | 11 – Carter | 4 – 3 tied | North Charleston Coliseum (2,659); North Charleston, SC |
| Mar 4, 2018; 6:00 pm | (7) | vs. (2) Northeastern; Quarterfinals | L 50–74 | 14–19 | 23 – Daly | 8 – Daly | 3 – Allen | North Charleston Coliseum (2,566); North Charleston, SC |
*Non-conference game. ^{#}Rankings from AP Poll. (#) Tournament seedings in parentheses. All times are in Eastern Time.

== See also ==
2017–18 Delaware Fightin' Blue Hens women's basketball team
