= Alihan Demir =

Turkish basketball player (born 1996)

Personal information
- Born: July 11, 1996 (age 30) Ankara, Turkey
- Listed height: 6 ft 9 in (2.06 m)
- Listed weight: 235 lb (107 kg)

Career information
- High school: Arı College (Ankara, Turkey); West Oaks Academy (Orlando, Florida)
- College: Central Wyoming (2016–2017); Drexel (2017–2019); Minnesota (2019–2020)
- NBA draft: 2020: undrafted
- Position: Power forward

Career history
- 2013–2014: Maliye Milli Piyango
- 2020–2021: Tofaş
- 2021: Balkan Botevgrad
- 2022: Beşiktaş
- 2022: Rayos de Hermosillo
- 2022–2023: Türk Telekom
- 2023: Héroes de Falcón
- 2023–2024: Merkezefendi Bld. Denizli Basket
- 2024: Santos del Potosí

Career highlights
- CIBACOPA All-Star (2022); Third-team All-CAA (2019)

Alihan Demir (born July 11, 1996) is a Turkish professional basketball player who last played for Merkezefendi Bld. Denizli Basket of the Basketbol Süper Ligi (BSL). He played college basketball for the Central Wyoming Rustlers, Drexel Dragons and Minnesota Golden Gophers.

== Early life ==
Demir attended Arı College in his hometown of Ankara and played point guard on the school's basketball team. As a senior, he played for Maliye Milli Piyango, a club team in Ankara.

After graduation, Demir moved to the United States and played for West Oaks Academy, a postgraduate program in Orlando, Florida, hoping to elevate his profile and earn a college scholarship. However, he received zero NCAA Division I offers and enrolled at Central Wyoming College in Riverton, Wyoming.

== College career ==
=== Central Wyoming ===
As a freshman at Central Wyoming College, Demir averaged 13.6 points and 7.3 rebounds while starting 28 of 29 games. He led the Rustlers to the NJCAA Region IX tournament quarterfinals and earned third-team Region IX honors. Demir later said that being in Wyoming helped him focus on basketball and school.

=== Drexel ===
In 2017, Demir signed a National Letter of Intent to play at Drexel University in Philadelphia. He missed the first five games of the season for the Dragons due to participating in an unsanctioned summer league, but recorded five points and eight rebounds in his debut against NJIT on November 25. Injuries quickly reduced the Drexel roster to seven scholarship players, and Demir received his first start against La Salle on December 7, contributing five points, five assists, and three rebounds in the 72–70 victory. He remained a starter for the rest of the season. On December 16, he scored a game-high 16 points in a 63–60 loss to crosstown rivals Temple. On January 5, 2018, Demir recorded a season-high 20 points in a 87–82 overtime victory over the College of Charleston. On February 8, he recorded 18 points and eight rebounds in a 94–92 overtime loss to Towson. As a sophomore, Demir averaged 10.7 points, 5.4 rebounds and 1.9 assists in 31.3 minutes per game.

Coming into his junior season (2018–19), Demir added weight to his frame to better manage the toll of a Division I schedule. On November 17, he scored 21 points, including 14 consecutive points during a second-half stretch, in an 89–84 win over La Salle. On November 28, Demir posted 18 points and 14 rebounds, both game-highs, in a 70–67 defeat to NJIT. It was his first double-double for Drexel. On December 5, Demir recorded a then career-high 24 points in a 95–86 victory over Loyola Marymount. He bested this mark two games later against Quinnipiac, coming off the bench to score 26 points on 11-of-15 shooting to lead the Dragons to a 92–83 win. On January 10, 2019, Demir contributed 20 points in a 79–78 victory over the College of Charleston. On January 17, he recorded his fifth double-double of the season with 22 points and a career-high 16 rebounds in a 72–66 win over Towson. On February 7, Demir posted a game-high 20 points and eight rebounds in a 69–57 victory against UNC Wilmington. In the following game, a 71–69 loss to James Madison, he scored a game-high 23 points, including 15 in the second half. On February 28, Demir recorded 24 points on 9-of-13 shooting in an 80–77 loss to Hofstra. As a junior, he averaged 14.8 points, 6.4 rebounds, and 2.9 assists in 30.3 minutes per game, earning third-team All-CAA honors. He was second on the team in both scoring and rebounding.

In April 2019, Demir entered his name into the NCAA transfer portal as a graduate transfer. On May 3, he committed to transfer to the University of Minnesota, choosing the Golden Gophers after having also taken a visit to Kansas State. He ran the decision by Vincent Grier, a Minnesota alum who had been Demir's teammate and mentor in Turkey seven years prior.

=== Minnesota ===
I wouldn’t consider myself the most physical guy, banging and bullying people inside. I’m more finesse. Obviously, we have different playing styles and he was captain. I’m going to try to fill in his shoes from a leadership standpoint. I’ll be one of the more experience guys, so I’ll try to help everybody with my experience.

— Demir on filling Jordan Murphy's spot at power forward

Coming into his senior year (2019–20) at Minnesota, Demir looked to fill in the gap left at power forward by outgoing senior Jordan Murphy, who graduated as the second-leading rebounder in Big Ten Conference history. Head coach Richard Pitino said that he expected Demir to make "an immediate impact" considering "his skill, size and versatility." He was immediately thrust into the starting lineup after redshirt junior Eric Curry suffered a torn ACL before the season. In his exhibition debut on August 6, 2019, Demir scored 15 points on 7-for-11 shooting and grabbed 10 rebounds in an 84–79 win over Italian team Stella Azzurra. On November 5, he scored 10 points in Minnesota's season opener, an 85–50 blowout win over Cleveland State. However, he averaged just 4.8 points on 29.6 percent shooting over the next four games. Following this stretch where he struggled to find his role offensively, Demir began "quietly playing terrific basketball," as put by Pitino.

On November 29, Demir posted a then season-high 14 points and six rebounds in a 73–68 loss to DePaul. He recorded 13 points and five rebounds in their Big Ten Conference opener, a 72–52 loss to Iowa on December 9. On January 5, 2020, Demir put up 11 points and nine rebounds in a 77–68 win over Northwestern. On January 9, he recorded 10 points, eight rebounds and three blocks in a 74–58 loss to top-ten-ranked Michigan State. Demir added 13 points, all in the second half, and five rebounds in their next game, a 75–67 win over Michigan on January 12. He did not score in double figures again until senior day on March 8, when he posted a season-high 19 points and 10 rebounds in a 107–75 victory over Nebraska. It was Demir's first double-double as a Golden Gopher. On March 11, he scored seven consecutive second-half points to jumpstart a comeback against Northwestern in the first round of the 2020 Big Ten Conference tournament, winning the game 74–57. This would be Demir's final game for Minnesota, however, as the remainder of the tournament was cancelled the next day due to the COVID-19 pandemic. As a senior, Demir averaged 7.1 points, 5.0 rebounds and 1.5 assists in 24.8 minutes per game.

== Professional career ==
=== Tofaş (2020–2021) ===
On June 8, 2020, Demir signed with Tofaş of the Turkish Basketbol Süper Ligi (BSL). He appeared in 26 league games, averaging 3.5 points and 1.7 rebounds per game. Demir also played in nine Basketball Champions League games in the 2020–21 season, averaging a modest 1.2 points and 1.1 rebounds in the continental competition.

=== Balkan Botevgrad (2021) ===
On August 13, 2021, Demir signed a one-year deal with Balkan Botevgrad of the Bulgarian National Basketball League (NBL). He recorded 16 points and five rebounds in his team debut, a 97–75 win over Yambol on October 8. Demir appeared in five NBL games and averaged 9.6 points, 5.0 rebounds and 1.6 assists. He also made two Balkan League appearances, averaging 6.0 points, 4.0 rebounds and 1.5 assists per game.

=== Beşiktaş (2022) ===
On January 14, 2022, Demir signed with Beşiktaş, making a return to the Turkish BSL in the middle of the 2021–22 season. He played in just three BSL games, averaging 1.3 points and 2.0 rebounds, in addition to one game in the Basketball Champions League.

=== Rayos de Hermosillo (2022) ===
In March 2022, it was announced that Demir had joined the Rayos de Hermosillo of the Mexican Circuito de Baloncesto de la Costa del Pacífico (CIBACOPA). He made his team debut on April 1, putting up 12 points and 11 rebounds in a 90–61 victory over the Ostioneros de Guaymas. On April 6, Demir recorded a season-high 31 points, along with 12 rebounds and five assists, in a 107–96 overtime win over the Tijuana Zonkeys. On April 13, he posted 21 points, seven rebounds and a season-high eight assists in a 102–86 win over the Ostioneros de Guaymas. In the following game on April 19, Demir recorded 22 points and 10 rebounds in a 92–73 loss to the Astros de Jalisco. On April 27, he recorded 27 points and a season-high 19 rebounds in a 80–77 victory over the Caballeros de Culiacán. On May 24, Demir scored 27 points in a 109–86 win over the Venados de Mazatlán. Demir suffered a fractured nose in a game against the Astros de Jalisco, forcing him to miss two weeks of action. He made his return during the Rayos' first-round playoff series against the Halcones de Ciudad Obregón. In 35 games, Demir averaged 14.6 points, 6.4 rebounds and 2.5 assists, earning league all-star honors.

=== Türk Telekom (2022–2023) ===
On September 3, 2022, Demir joined Turkish team Türk Telekom of the Basketbol Süper Ligi (BSL). He appeared in nine BSL games, as well as four games in the EuroCup.

=== Héroes de Falcón (2023) ===
In April 2023, Demir signed with Venezuelan club Héroes de Falcón of the Superliga Profesional de Baloncesto (SBP). In 12 league games, he averaged 6.5 points, 5.7 rebounds and 1.3 assists per game.

=== Merkezefendi Bld. Denizli Basket (2023–2024) ===
On July 4, 2023, Demir signed with Merkezefendi Bld. Denizli Basket of the Basketbol Süper Ligi (BSL).

== Personal life ==
Demir was born to Mustafa and Nebahat Demir, and has one sister named Didem. While at Drexel, Demir became close friends with Philadelphia 76ers player Furkan Korkmaz; the pair had previously played against each other several times in youth competitions in Turkey. Demir received a bachelor's degree in marketing before pursuing a master's degree in youth development leadership at the University of Minnesota.
