= Tramaine Isabell =

American basketball player (born 1995)

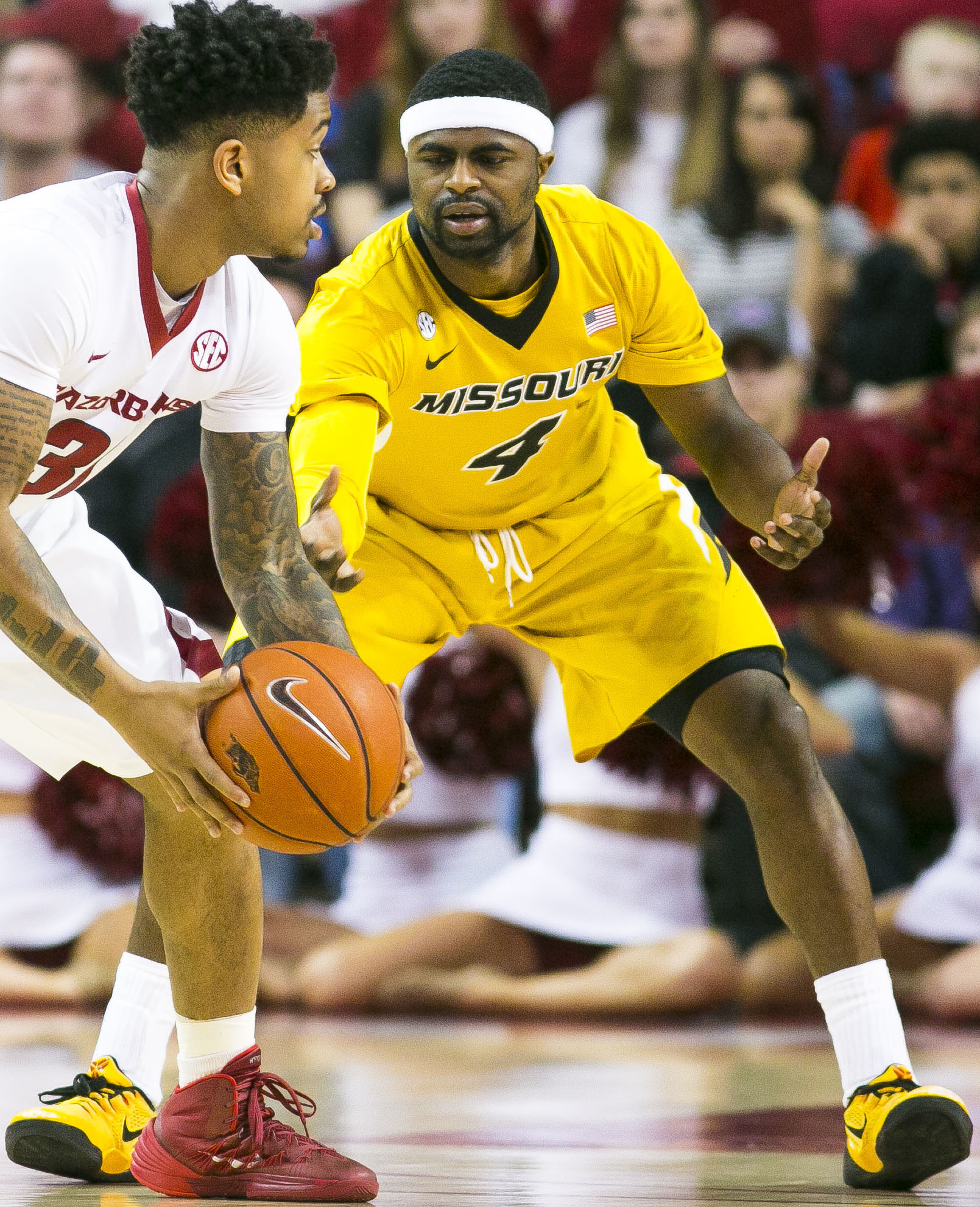

No. 2 – retired
- Position: Point guard

Personal information
- Born: June 27, 1995 (age 31) Seattle, Washington, U.S.
- Listed height: 6 ft 1 in (1.85 m)
- Listed weight: 190 lb (86 kg)

Career information
- High school: Garfield (Seattle, Washington)
- College: Missouri (2014–2016); Drexel (2017–2018); Saint Louis (2018–2019)
- NBA draft: 2019: undrafted
- Playing career: 2019–2022

Career history
- 2019–2020: ETHA Engomis
- 2020–2021: KK Dubrava
- 2021: KB Trepça
- 2022: Artland Dragons

Career highlights
- Second-team All-CAA (2018); Atlantic 10 tournament MVP (2019)

Tramaine Isabell (born June 27, 1995) is a retired American professional basketball player, lastly for Artland Dragons of the ProA. He played college basketball for the Missouri Tigers, Drexel Dragons, and Saint Louis Billikens.

== College career ==
He started his college career at Missouri, averaging 4.1 points, 1 rebound and 1.3 assists per game as a freshman, then 6.2 points and 1.7 rebounds as a sophomore. Isabell showed flashes of high scoring at Missouri, including two 17-point games late in the season.

After his redshirt year, he averaged 21.0 points, 7.5 rebounds and 3.4 assists per game as a junior at Drexel. On February 22, 2018, Tramaine Isabell led the Drexel Dragons to come back from a 34 point deficit (trailing 53–19 at one point), coming back to defeat Delaware 85–83 to complete the largest comeback in Division I history. In this game he had 30 points, 10 rebounds, and 9 assists. He was named to the Second Team All-CAA as a junior. After the season, Isabell took advantage of the NCAA grad transfer rule and moved to Saint Louis.

During his senior year, he helped lead the Saint Louis Billikens to the NCAA Tournament after averaging 13.7 points, 4.1 rebounds, and 3.6 assists per game. He was named the Most Valuable Player of the A-10 tournament for his dominant performances.

== Professional career ==
After going undrafted in the 2019 NBA draft, Isabell joined the Los Angeles Clippers for the 2019 NBA Summer League. He then signed his first professional contract with the Antwerp Giants of the Belgian Pro Basketball League. On September 17, Antwerp and Isabell parted ways before he appeared in an official game.

He signed with ETHA Engomis of the Cypriot league. In seven games, Isabell averaged 12.0 points, 4.1 rebounds, 2.4 assists and 1.9 steals per game. On January 1, 2021, he signed with KK Dubrava. Isabell averaged 18.53 points, 3.0 rebounds, 5.0 assists, and 1.47 steals.

On January 10, 2022, he has signed with Artland Dragons of the ProA.
