= 2015–16 Colonial Athletic Association men's basketball season =

- League: NCAA Division I
- Sport: Basketball
- Duration: November, 2015 – March, 2016
- Teams: 10

Regular Season
- Co-champions: Hofstra, UNC Wilmington
- Runners-up: Towson, James Madison, William & Mary
- Season MVP: Juan'ya Green (Hofstra)
- Top scorer: David Walker (Northeastern)

Tournament
- Champions: UNC Wilmington
- Runners-up: Hofstra
- Finals MVP: Chris Flemmings (UNCW)

CAA men's basketball seasons
- ← 2014–15 2016–17 →

2015–16 CAA men's basketball standings
| | Conf. | | | | Overall |
| Team | W | | L | PCT | W | | L | PCT |
|---|---|---|---|---|---|---|---|---|
| Hofstra | 14 | – | 4 | .778 | 24 | – | 10 | .706 |
| UNC Wilmington † | 14 | – | 4 | .778 | 25 | – | 8 | .758 |
| Towson | 11 | – | 7 | .611 | 20 | – | 13 | .606 |
| James Madison | 11 | – | 7 | .611 | 21 | – | 11 | .656 |
| William & Mary | 11 | – | 7 | .611 | 20 | – | 11 | .645 |
| Northeastern | 9 | – | 9 | .500 | 18 | – | 15 | .545 |
| College of Charleston | 8 | – | 10 | .444 | 17 | – | 14 | .548 |
| Elon | 7 | – | 11 | .389 | 16 | – | 16 | .500 |
| Drexel | 3 | – | 15 | .167 | 6 | – | 25 | .194 |
| Delaware | 2 | – | 16 | .111 | 7 | – | 23 | .233 |
† 2016 CAA tournament winner

The 2015–16 CAA men's basketball season marked the 31st season of Colonial Athletic Association basketball, taking place between November 2015 and March 2016. Practices commenced in October 2015, and the season ended with the 2016 CAA men's basketball tournament.

== Preseason ==
=== Preseason Poll ===
| Rank | Team |
|---|---|
| 1 | Hofstra |
| 2 | James Madison |
| 3 | Northeastern |
| 4 | William & Mary |
| 5 | Delaware |
| 6 | UNC Wilmington |
| 7 | Towson |
| 8 | Drexel |
| 9 | College of Charleston |
| 10 | Elon |

=== Preseason All-Conference Teams ===
| Award | Recipients |
|---|---|
| First Team | Ron Curry (James Madison) Juan'ya Green (Hofstra); Ameen Tanksley (Hofstra); Terry Tarpey (William & Mary); David Walker (Northeastern) |
| Second Team | Yohanny Dalembert (James Madison) John Davis (Towson); Quincy Ford (Northeastern); Kory Holden (Delaware); Omar Prewitt (William & Mary) |
| Honorable Mention | Tavon Allen (Drexel) Canyon Barry (College of Charleston); Arnaud William Andala Moto (Towson); Craig Ponder (UNCW); Tanner Samson (Elon) |

Colonial Athletic Association Preseason Player of the Year: Juan'ya Green, Hofstra

== Regular season ==
=== Head coaches ===
- Earl Grant, Charleston
- Monté Ross, Delaware
- Bruiser Flint, Drexel
- Matt Matheny, Elon
- Joe Mihalich, Hofstra
- Matt Brady, James Madison
- Bill Coen, Northeastern
- Pat Skerry, Towson
- Kevin Keatts, UNC Wilmington
- Tony Shaver, William & Mary

=== Rankings ===
Legend
| Increase in ranking |
| Decrease in ranking |
| Not ranked previous week |

| | | Pre | Wk 2 | Wk 3 | Wk 4 | Wk 5 | Wk 6 | Wk 7 | Wk 8 | Wk 9 | Wk 10 | Wk 11 | Wk 12 | Wk 13 | Wk 14 | Wk 15 | Wk 16 | Wk 17 | Wk 18 | Wk 19 | Final |
|---|---|---|---|---|---|---|---|---|---|---|---|---|---|---|---|---|---|---|---|---|---|
| College of Charleston | AP | | | | | | | | | | | | | | | | | | | | |
| College of Charleston | C | | | | | | | | | | | | | | | | | | | | |
| Delaware | AP | | | | | | | | | | | | | | | | | | | | |
| Delaware | C | | | | | | | | | | | | | | | | | | | | |
| Drexel | AP | | | | | | | | | | | | | | | | | | | | |
| Drexel | C | | | | | | | | | | | | | | | | | | | | |
| Elon | AP | | | | | | | | | | | | | | | | | | | | |
| Elon | C | | | | | | | | | | | | | | | | | | | | |
| Hofstra | AP | | | | | | | | | | | | | | | | | | | | |
| Hofstra | C | | | | | | | | | | | | | | | | | | | | |
| James Madison | AP | | | | | | | | | | | | | | | | | | | | |
| James Madison | C | | | | | | | | | | | | | | | | | | | | |
| Northeastern | AP | | | | RV | NR | | | | | | | | | | | | | | | |
| Northeastern | C | | | | | | | | | | | | | | | | | | | | |
| Towson | AP | | | | | | | | | | | | | | | | | | | | |
| Towson | C | | | | | | | | | | | | | | | | | | | | |
| UNC Wilmington | AP | | | | | | | | | | | | | | RV | RV | NR | | | | |
| UNC Wilmington | C | | | | | | | | | | | | | | | | | | | | |
| William & Mary | AP | | | | | | | | | | | | | | | | | | | | |
| William & Mary | C | | | | | | | | | | | | | | | | | | | | |

== Postseason ==
=== Colonial Athletic Association tournament ===
- March 4–7, 2016: Colonial Athletic Association Men's Basketball Tournament, Royal Farms Arena, Baltimore, Maryland

UNC Wilmington defeated Hofstra, 80–73 (OT), in the finals of the 2016 CAA men's basketball tournament to win the conference, and earn an automatic bid to the 2016 NCAA Men's Division I Basketball Tournament.

=== NCAA tournament ===
The CAA had one bid to the 2016 NCAA Men's Division I Basketball Tournament, that being the automatic bid of UNC Wilmington by winning the conference tournament.

| Seed | Region | School | First Four | First round | Second round | Sweet 16 | Elite Eight | Final Four | Championship |
|---|---|---|---|---|---|---|---|---|---|
| 13 | West | UNC Wilmington | Bye | Eliminated by Duke 85–93 | | | | | |
| Bids | | W-L (%): | 0–0 (–) | 0–1 (.000) | 0–0 (–) | 0–0 (–) | 0–0 (–) | 0–0 (–) | TOTAL: 0–1 (.000) |

=== National Invitation tournament ===
The CAA had one bid to the 2016 National Invitation Tournament, that being the automatic bid of Hofstra by winning the conference's regular season championship.

| Seed | School | First round | Second round | Quarterfinals | Semifinals | Championship |
|---|---|---|---|---|---|---|
| 5 | Hofstra | Eliminated by George Washington 80–82 | | | | |
| Bids | W-L (%): | 0–1 (.000) | 0–0 (–) | 0–0 (–) | 0–0 (–) | TOTAL: 0–1 (.000) |

=== Vegas 16 tournament ===
Towson was invited to play in the 2016 Vegas 16 Tournament.

| School | Quarterfinals | Semifinals | Championship |
|---|---|---|---|
| Towson | Eliminated by Oakland 72–90 | | |
| W-L (%): | 0–1 (.000) | 0–0 (–) | TOTAL: 0–1 (.000) |

=== College Basketball Invitational ===
No teams from the CAA accepted bids to play in the 2016 College Basketball Invitational.

=== CollegeInsider.com Postseason tournament ===
No teams from the CAA accepted bids to play in the 2016 CollegeInsider.com Postseason Tournament.

== Awards and honors ==
=== Regular season ===
==== CAA Player-of-the-Week ====
- Nov. 16 – Shakir Brown (James Madison), David Walker (Northeastern)
- Nov. 23 – Canyon Barry (Charleston), Juan'ya Green (Hofstra)
- Nov. 30 – Quincy Ford (Northeastern)
- Dec. 7 – Tanner Samson (Elon)
- Dec. 14 – Canyon Barry (Charleston) (2), Marvin King-Davis (Delaware)
- Dec. 21 – Ron Curry (James Madison), Kory Holden (Delaware)
- Dec. 28 – Canyon Barry (Charleston) (3), Quincy Ford (Northeastern) (2)
- Jan. 4 – Quincy Ford (Northeastern) (3), Juan'ya Green (Hofstra) (2)
- Jan. 11 – Terry Tarpey (William & Mary)
- Jan. 18 – Chris Flemmings (UNCW), Rokas Gustys (Hofstra)
- Jan. 25 – Juan'ya Green (Hofstra) (3)
- Feb. 1 – Chris Flemmings (UNCW) (2)
- Feb. 8 – Ron Curry (James Madison) (2), Omar Prewitt (William & Mary)
- Feb. 15 – Rokas Gustys (Hofstra) (2)
- Feb. 22 – Quincy Ford (Northeastern) (4), Juan'ya Green (Hofstra) (4)
- Feb. 29 – Juan'ya Green (Hofstra) (5)

==== CAA Rookie-of-the-Week ====
- Nov. 16 – Terrell Allen (Drexel)
- Nov. 23 – Dainan Swoope (Elon)
- Nov. 30 – C. J. Bryce (UNCW)
- Dec. 7 – Nick Harris (Charleston)
- Dec. 14 – Jeremy Miller (Northeastern)
- Dec. 21 – Tyler Seibring (Elon)
- Dec. 28 – C. J. Bryce (UNCW) (2)
- Jan. 4 – Jarrell Brantley (Charleston)
- Jan. 11 – Tyler Seibring (Elon) (2)
- Jan. 18 – Tyler Seibring (Elon) (3)
- Jan. 25 – C. J. Bryce (UNCW) (3)
- Feb. 1 – Marquise Pointer (Charleston)
- Feb. 8 – C. J. Bryce (UNCW) (4)
- Feb. 15 – Jarrell Brantley (Charleston) (2)
- Feb. 22 – Terrell Allen (Drexel) (2)
- Feb. 29 – Jarrell Brantley (Charleston) (3)

=== Postseason ===
==== CAA All-Conference Teams and Awards ====
| Award | Recipients |
|---|---|
| Coach of the Year | Kevin Keatts (UNC Wilmington) |
| Player of the Year | Juan'ya Green (Hofstra) |
| Defensive Player of the Year | Terry Tarpey (William & Mary) |
| Rookie of the Year | Jarrell Brantley (College of Charleston) |
| Dean Ehlers Leadership Award | Caleb Donnelly (Northeastern) |
| First Team | Ron Curry (James Madison); Chris Flemmings (UNC Wilmington); Juan'ya Green (Hofstra); Rokas Gustys (Hofstra); Omar Prewitt (William & Mary); David Walker (Northeastern) |
| Second Team | William Adala Moto (Towson); Quincy Ford (Northeastern); Kory Holden (Delaware); Ameen Tanksley (Hofstra); Terry Tarpey (William & Mary) |
| Third Team | Jarrell Brantley (College of Charleston); Denzel Ingram (UNC Wilmington); Cameron Johnson (Charleston); Marvin King-Davis (Delaware); Mike Morsell (Towson) |
| All-Defensive Team | Ron Curry (James Madison); Rokas Gustys (Hofstra); Payton Hulsey (College of Charleston); Cameron Johnson (College of Charleston); Timajh Parker-Rivera (Towson); Terry Tarpey (William & Mary) |
| All-Rookie Team | Terrell Allen (Drexel); Jarrell Brantley (College of Charleston); C. J. Bryce (UNC Wilmington); Marquise Pointer (Charleston); Tyler Seibring (Elon) |
| All-Academic Team | William Adala Moto (Towson); Jack Anton (Elon); Evan Bailey (College of Charleston); Canyon Barry (College of Charleston); Dimitrije Cabarkapa (James Madison); Caleb Donnelly (Northeastern); Luke Eddy (Elon); Rokas Gustys (Hofstra) Christian Hairston (Elon); Kevin Hickson (UNC Wilmington); Sean Locke (Delaware); Timajh Parker-Rivera (Towson); Michael Schlotman (William & Mary); Sean Sheldon (William & Mary); Rodney Williams (Drexel) |
| All-Tournament Team | Chris Flemmings (UNC Wilmington); Juan'ya Green (Hofstra); Rokas Gustys (Hofstra); Denzel Ingram (UNC Wilmington); Craig Ponder (UNC Wilmington); Ameen Tanksley (Hofstra) |
| Tournament MVP | Chris Flemmings (UNC Wilmington) |
