= 2015–16 UNC Wilmington Seahawks men's basketball team =

American college basketball season

2015–16 UNC Wilmington Seahawks men's basketball

CAA regular season co–champions CAA tournament champions

NCAA tournament, First Round
- Conference: Colonial Athletic Association
- Record: 25–8 (14–4 CAA)
- Head coach: Kevin Keatts (2nd season)
- Assistant coaches: Casey Stanley; Takayo Siddle; Thomas Carr
- Home arena: Trask Coliseum

2015–16 CAA men's basketball standings
	Conf.				Overall
Team	W		L	PCT	W		L	PCT
Hofstra	14	–	4	.778	24	–	10	.706
UNC Wilmington †	14	–	4	.778	25	–	8	.758
Towson	11	–	7	.611	20	–	13	.606
James Madison	11	–	7	.611	21	–	11	.656
William & Mary	11	–	7	.611	20	–	11	.645
Northeastern	9	–	9	.500	18	–	15	.545
College of Charleston	8	–	10	.444	17	–	14	.548
Elon	7	–	11	.389	16	–	16	.500
Drexel	3	–	15	.167	6	–	25	.194
Delaware	2	–	16	.111	7	–	23	.233
† 2016 CAA tournament winner

The 2015–16 UNC Wilmington Seahawks men's basketball team represented the University of North Carolina Wilmington during the 2015–16 NCAA Division I men's basketball season. The Seahawks were led by second-year head coach Kevin Keatts and played their home games at the Trask Coliseum. They were members of the Colonial Athletic Association. They finished the season 25–8, 14–4 in CAA play to finish in a tie for the CAA championship with Hofstra. They were champions of the CAA tournament to earn an automatic bid to the NCAA tournament where they lost in the first round to Duke.

== Previous season ==
The Seahawks finished the season 18–14, 12–6 in CAA play to finish in a four way tie for the CAA regular season championship. They advanced to the semifinals of the CAA tournament where they lost to Northeastern. They were invited to the CollegeInsider.com Tournament where they lost in the first round to Sam Houston State.

== Departures ==
Name	Number	Pos.	Height	Weight	Year	Hometown	Notes
Freddie Jackson	10	G	6'4"	185	Senior	Wilmington, NC	Graduated
Malik Pugh	14	G	6'1"	165	Freshman	Dyersburg, TN	Transferred to Tennessee-Martin
Jarvis Haywood	22	G	6'4"	185	Redshirt Junior	Charlotte, NC	Dismissed from team; transferred to William Penn
Addison Spruill	24	G	6'4"	225	Senior	Currie, NC	Graduated
Cedrick Williams	40	F	6'9"	225	Senior	Murfreesboro, TN	Graduated

== Recruiting class of 2015 ==
College recruiting information
Name	Hometown	School	Height	Weight	Commit date
Mark Mathews; SG	Fort Myers, FL	Fort Myers High School	6 ft 6 in (1.98 m)	200 lb (91 kg)	Aug 24, 2014
Mark Mathews; SG	Recruit ratings: Scout: Rivals: (63)				
C. J. Bryce; SG	Huntersville, NC	North Mecklenburg High School	6 ft 5 in (1.96 m)	190 lb (86 kg)	Oct 3, 2014
C. J. Bryce; SG	Recruit ratings: Scout: Rivals: (NR)				
Trey Grundy; SF	Lexington, KY	Hargrave Military Academy	6 ft 7 in (2.01 m)	204 lb (93 kg)	Sep 28, 2014
Trey Grundy; SF	Recruit ratings: Scout: Rivals: (70)				
Devontae Cacok; PF	Riverdale, GA	Alpharetta High School	6 ft 6 in (1.98 m)	195 lb (88 kg)	Sep 8, 2014
Devontae Cacok; PF	Recruit ratings: Scout: Rivals: (NR)				
Overall recruit ranking:
Note: In many cases, Scout, Rivals, 247Sports, On3, and ESPN may conflict in their listings of height and weight.; In these cases, the average was taken. ESPN grades are on a 100-point scale.; Sources: "2015 Team Ranking". Rivals.

=== Incoming transfers ===
Name	Number	Pos.	Height	Weight	Year	Hometown	Previous School
JaQuel Richmond		G	6'1"	170	Sophomore	Greensboro, NC	Middle Tennessee
Colton Bishop		G	6'3"	165	Sophomore	Winston-Salem, NC	Loyola

== Roster ==
2015–16 UNC Wilmington Seahawks men's basketball team
Players
Coaches

Pos.	#	Name	Height	Weight	Year	Previous school	Hometown
G	0	Craig Ponder	6 ft 1 in (1.85 m)	185 lb (84 kg)	RS Sr	Bluefield	Bluefield, WV
G	1	Chris Flemmings	6 ft 5 in (1.96 m)	175 lb (79 kg)	RS Jr	Green Hope/Barton College	Cary, NC
G	2	Mark Matthews	6 ft 6 in (1.98 m)	210 lb (95 kg)	Fr	Fort Myers	Fort Myers, FL
F	3	Trey Grundy	6 ft 6 in (1.98 m)	210 lb (95 kg)	Fr	Hargrave Military Academy	Lexington, KY
G	4	Jordan Talley	6 ft 0 in (1.83 m)	180 lb (82 kg)	So	Henrico	Richmond, VA
G	10	Denzel Ingram	6 ft 0 in (1.83 m)	170 lb (77 kg)	RS Jr	Chapel Hill/Charlotte	Chapel Hill, NC
G	12	C. J. Bryce	6 ft 5 in (1.96 m)	180 lb (82 kg)	Fr	North Mecklenburg	Huntersville, NC
F	13	Chuck Ogbodo	6 ft 9 in (2.06 m)	230 lb (104 kg)	Jr	High Point Christian	Enugu, Nigeria
F	15	Devontae Cacok	6 ft 7 in (2.01 m)	210 lb (95 kg)	Fr	Alpharetta	Riverdale, GA
F	20	Dylan Sherwood	6 ft 9 in (2.06 m)	215 lb (98 kg)	RS Sr	Sutherland	Pittsford, NY
F	21	Marcus Bryan	6 ft 7 in (2.01 m)	225 lb (102 kg)	RS So	Ravenscroft/Charlotte	Raleigh, NC
C	23	C. J. Gettys	7 ft 0 in (2.13 m)	275 lb (125 kg)	RS Jr	Findlay	Findlay, OH
F	30	Kevin Hickson (W)	6 ft 8 in (2.03 m)	215 lb (98 kg)	Sr	Providence Day/Wofford	Charlotte, NC
G	32	Nick Powell (W)	6 ft 4 in (1.93 m)	200 lb (91 kg)	So	Northwest Guilford	Greensboro, NC
G		Colton Bishop (redshirt)	6 ft 3 in (1.91 m)	165 lb (75 kg)	So	Forsyth Country Day/Loyola	Winston-Salem, NC
G		JaQuel Richmond (redshirt)	6 ft 1 in (1.85 m)	170 lb (77 kg)	So	Wesleyan Christian Academy/Middle Tennessee	Greensboro, NC

Head coach

- Kevin Keatts (Ferrum)

Assistant coach(es)

- Casey Stanley (Iona)
- Takayo Siddle (Gardner–Webb)
- Thomas Carr (Pfeiffer)

Legend

- (C) Team captain
- (S) Suspended
- (I) Ineligible
- (W) Walk-on
- Injured
- Current redshirt

Roster

== Schedule ==
Date time, TV	Rank^{#}	Opponent^{#}	Result	Record	Site city, state
Exhibition
Nov 8*; 4:00 pm		Barton	W 81–51	1–0	Trask Coliseum (3,146); Wilmington, NC
Non-conference regular season
Nov 13*; 7:00 pm		Milligan	W 100–62	1–0	Trask Coliseum (3,520); Wilmington, NC
Nov 16*; 7:00 pm		Eastern Kentucky	W 78–59	2–0	Trask Coliseum (3,585); Wilmington, NC
Nov 21*; 7:00 pm		Western Michigan	W 80–76	3–0	Trask Coliseum (4,019); Wilmington, NC
Nov 28*; 4:00 pm		at East Tennessee State	W 94–73	4–0	Freedom Hall Civic Center (2,557); Johnson City, TN
Dec 2*; 7:00 pm		Coker	W 93–73	5–0	Trask Coliseum (3,572); Wilmington, NC
Dec 12*; 2:00 pm, CBSSN		at Georgetown; BB&T Classic	L 82–87	5–1	Verizon Center (8,132); Washington, D.C.
Dec 16*; 7:00 pm, ESPN3		at East Carolina	L 73–78	5–2	Williams Arena (4,038); Greenville, NC
Dec 19*; 4:00 pm		at Radford	L 67–69	5–3	Dedmon Center (1,064); Radford, VA
Dec 22*; 6:15 pm		vs. Utah Valley; Billy Minardi Classic	W 102–77	6–3	KFC Yum! Center (19,419); Louisville, KY
Dec 23*; 4:15 pm		vs. UMKC; Billy Minardi Classic	W 76–56	7–3	KFC Yum! Center (19,147); Louisville, KY
Dec 28*; 8:00 pm		Campbell	W 106–83	8–3	Trask Coliseum (4,396); Wilmington, NC
CAA regular season
Dec 31; 1:00 pm		Drexel	W 75–63	9–3 (1–0)	Trask Coliseum (3,599); Wilmington, NC
Jan 2; 6:00 pm, ASN		Northeastern	L 63–65	9–4 (1–1)	Trask Coliseum (3,974); Wilmington, NC
Jan 7; 7:00 pm		at Towson	L 60–76	9–5 (1–2)	SECU Arena (1,381); Towson, MD
Jan 9; 7:00 pm		at Delaware	W 85–67	10–5 (2–2)	Bob Carpenter Center (2,381); Newark, DE
Jan 14; 7:00 pm		at Elon	W 91–82	11–5 (3–2)	Alumni Gym (1,357); Elon, NC
Jan 16; 2:00 pm, ASN		William & Mary	W 97–94 ^{OT}	12–5 (4–2)	Trask Coliseum (4,211); Wilmington, NC
Jan 21; 7:00 pm		Delaware	W 79–70	13–5 (5–2)	Trask Coliseum (4,037); Wilmington, NC
Jan 23; 6:00 pm, ASN		at Drexel; Postponed to January 24 (Snow)			Daskalakis Athletic Center; Philadelphia, PA
Jan 24; 12:00 pm, ASN		at Drexel	W 77–71	14–5 (6–2)	Daskalakis Athletic Center (332); Philadelphia, PA
Jan 28; 7:00 pm		at James Madison	W 78–73	15–5 (7–2)	JMU Convocation Center (3,107); Harrisburg, VA
Jan 30; 7:00 pm		College of Charleston; Homecoming	W 66–55	16–5 (8–2)	Trask Coliseum (5,100); Wilmington, NC
Feb 4; 7:00 pm		at Hofstra	W 70–67	17–5 (9–2)	Mack Sports Complex (2,057); Hempstead, NY
Feb 6; 7:00 pm		at Northeastern	W 90–73	18–5 (10–2)	Matthews Arena (1,677); Boston, MA
Feb 11; 7:00 pm		Elon	W 86–82	19–5 (11–2)	Trask Coliseum (4,136); Wilmington, NC
Feb 13; 3:00 pm, NBCSN		James Madison	W 78–68	20–5 (12–2)	Trask Coliseum (5,100); Wilmington, NC
Feb 18; 7:00 pm		at William & Mary	L 69–87	20–6 (12–3)	Kaplan Arena (3,148); Williamsburg, VA
Feb 20; 6:00 pm, ASN		at College of Charleston	W 59–55 ^{OT}	21–6 (13–3)	TD Arena (3,629); Charleston, SC
Feb 25; 7:00 pm		Hofstra	W 70–69	21–7 (13–4)	Trask Coliseum (4,572); Wilmington, NC
Feb 27; 1:00 pm		Towson	W 74–68	22–7 (14–4)	Trask Coliseum (4,791); Wilmington, NC
CAA tournament
Mar 5; 6:00 pm, CSN	(2)	vs. (7) College of Charleston; Quarterfinals	W 66–64	23–7	Royal Farms Arena (3,450); Baltimore, MD
Mar 6; 3:30 pm, NBCSN	(2)	vs. (6) Northeastern; Semifinals	W 73–70	24–7	Royal Farms Arena (3,643); Baltimore, MD
Mar 7; 7:00 pm, NBCSN	(2)	vs. (1) Hofstra; Championship	W 80–73 ^{OT}	25–7	Royal Farms Arena (3,031); Baltimore, MD
NCAA tournament
Mar 17*; 12:15 pm, CBS	(13 W)	vs. (4 W) No. 19 Duke; First Round	L 85–93	25–8	Dunkin' Donuts Center (11,656); Providence, RI
*Non-conference game. ^{#}Rankings from AP poll. (#) Tournament seedings in parentheses. W=West. All times are in Eastern Time.

== See also ==
2015–16 UNC Wilmington Seahawks women's basketball team
