= 2016 CAA men's basketball tournament =

- Tournament Logo
- Classification: Division I
- Season: 2015–16
- Teams: 10
- Site: Royal Farms Arena; Baltimore, Maryland
- Champions: UNC Wilmington (5th title)
- Winning coach: Kevin Keatts (1st title)
- MVP: Chris Flemmings (UNC Wilmington)
- Attendance: 16,198
- Top scorer: Ameen Tanksley (Hofstra) (60 points)
- Television: CAA.tv, CSN, NBCSN

2015–16 CAA men's basketball standings
	Conf.				Overall
Team	W		L	PCT	W		L	PCT
Hofstra	14	–	4	.778	24	–	10	.706
UNC Wilmington †	14	–	4	.778	25	–	8	.758
Towson	11	–	7	.611	20	–	13	.606
James Madison	11	–	7	.611	21	–	11	.656
William & Mary	11	–	7	.611	20	–	11	.645
Northeastern	9	–	9	.500	18	–	15	.545
College of Charleston	8	–	10	.444	17	–	14	.548
Elon	7	–	11	.389	16	–	16	.500
Drexel	3	–	15	.167	6	–	25	.194
Delaware	2	–	16	.111	7	–	23	.233
† 2016 CAA tournament winner

The 2016 Colonial Athletic Association men's basketball tournament was held March 4–7, 2016 at Royal Farms Arena in Baltimore, Maryland. The champion, UNC Wilmington, received an automatic bid to the 2016 NCAA tournament.

== Seeds ==
All 10 conference teams were eligible for the tournament. The top 6 seeds received a bye to the Quarterfinals. Teams were seeded by record within the conference, with a tiebreaker system to seed teams with identical conference records.

Seed	School	Conference	Overall	Tiebreaker
1	† Hofstra	14–4	22–8	1–1 vs. UNC Wilmington, 2–0 vs. Northeastern
2	† UNC Wilmington	14–4	22–7	1–1 vs. Hofstra, 1–1 vs. Northeastern
3	Towson	11–7	20–11	2–0 vs. William & Mary, 1–1 vs. James Madison
4	James Madison	11–7	21–10	1–1 vs. Towson, 1–1 vs. William & Mary
5	William & Mary	11–7	19–10	1–1 vs. James Madison, 0–2 vs. Towson
6	Northeastern	9–9	17–14	
7	College of Charleston	8–10	16–13	
8	Elon	7–11	16–15	
9	Drexel	3–15	5–24	
10	Delaware	2–16	7–22	
† –CAA regular season champions Overall and conference records are as of the end of the regular season.

== Schedule ==
Session	Game	Time*	Matchup^{#}	Television
First round – Friday March 4, 2016
1	1	6:00 pm	#9 Drexel 57 vs #8 Elon 56	CAA.tv
1	2	8:30 pm	#10 Delaware 63 vs #7 College of Charleston 67	CAA.tv
Quarterfinals – Saturday March 5, 2016
2	3	12:00 pm	#9 Drexel 67 vs #1 Hofstra 80	Comcast SportsNet
2	4	2:30 pm	#5 William & Mary 79 vs #4 James Madison 64	Comcast SportsNet
3	5	6:00 pm	#7 College of Charleston 64 vs #2 UNC Wilmington 66	Comcast SportsNet
3	6	8:30 pm	#6 Northeastern 71 vs #3 Towson 60	Comcast SportsNet
Semifinals – Sunday March 6, 2016
4	7	1:00 pm	#5 William & Mary 67 vs #1 Hofstra 70	NBCSN
4	8	3:30 pm	#6 Northeastern 70 vs #2 UNC Wilmington 73	NBCSN
Championship – Monday March 7, 2016
5	9	7:00 pm	#2 UNC Wilmington 80 vs #1 Hofstra 73 (OT)	NBCSN
*Game times in ET. #-Rankings denote tournament seed

== Bracket ==
First round Friday, March 4 CAA.tv
8	Elon	56
9	Drexel	57
7	College of Charleston	67
10	Delaware	63

Quarterfinals; Saturday, March 5 Comcast SportsNet
1	Hofstra	80
9	Drexel	67
4	James Madison	64
5	William & Mary	79
2	UNC Wilmington	66
7	College of Charleston	64
3	Towson	60
6	Northeastern	71

Semifinals; Sunday, March 6 NBCSN
1	Hofstra	70
5	William & Mary	67
2	UNC Wilmington	73
6	Northeastern	70

Final; Monday, March 7 NBCSN
1	Hofstra	73
2	UNC Wilmington	80*

* Denotes overtime period.

== Game summaries ==
=== First round ===
CAA.tv

March 4, 2016
6:00 pm

#9 Drexel 57, #8 Elon 56
Scoring by half: 34–21, 23–35
Pts: Ta. Allen – 17; Rebs: R. Williams – 10; Asts: 4 Tied – 2 Te. Allen – 3 Stls	Pts: Eddy – 11; Rebs: Seibring – 7 Asts: Seibring – 3 Thompson – 3 Stls

Royal Farms Arena
Baltimore, MD
Attendance: 2,170
Referees: A. Marotta, H. Bostic, T. Ebersole

CAA.tv

March 4, 2016
8:30 pm

#10 Delaware 63, #7 College of Charleston 67
Scoring by half: 28–35, 35–32
Pts: Holden – 30; Rebs: Jeffers – 8 Asts: Holden – 2 Johnson – 15 Pts	Pts: Hulsey – 18; Rebs: Brantley – 10; Asts: Hulsey – 5 Brantley – 4 Stls

Royal Farms Arena
Baltimore, MD
Attendance: 2,170
Referees: M. Oblas, M. Dorn, J. Nichols

=== Quarterfinals ===
Comcast SportsNet

March 5, 2016
12:00 pm

Recap

#9 Drexel 67, #1 Hofstra 80
Scoring by half: 29–42, 38–38
Pts: R. Williams – 20; Rebs: R. Williams – 11; Asts: Te. Allen – 8 Abif – 18 Pts, 8 Rebs	Pts: Green – 22; Rebs: Gustys – 11; Asts: Green – 4 Gustys – 16 Pts

Royal Farms Arena
Baltimore, MD
Attendance: 3,904
Referees: A. Marotta, D. Hopper, A. Cox

Comcast SportsNet

March 5, 2016
2:30 pm

Recap

#5 William & Mary 79, #4 James Madison 64
Scoring by half: 31–15, 48–49
Pts: Prewitt – 25; Rebs: Sheldon – 6 Asts: Tarpey – 6 Cohn – 10 Pts, 5 Asts	Pts: Curry – 20; Rebs: Curry – 11; Asts: McLean – 4 Mc Lean – 13 Pts

Royal Farms Arena
Baltimore, MD
Attendance: 3,904
Referees: M. Oblas, J. Wall, H. Bostic

Comcast SportsNet

March 5, 2016
6:00 pm

Recap

#7 College of Charleston 64, #2 UNC Wilmington 66
Scoring by half: 40–27, 24–39
Pts: Johnson – 21; Rebs: Brantley – 8 Asts: Hulsey – 5 Brantley – 15 Pts	Pts: Bryan – 16; Rebs: Bryce – 8 Asts: 2 with 3 Flemmings – 13 Pts

Royal Farms Arena
Baltimore, MD
Attendance: 3,450
Referees: T. Ebersole, M. Dorn, T. Attanasi

Comcast SportsNet

March 5, 2016
8:30 pm

Recap

#6 Northeastern 71, #3 Towson 60
Scoring by half: 29–32, 42–28
Pts: Ford – 20; Rebs: Ford – 7 Asts: Walker – 6 Walker – 18 Pts	Pts: Adala Moto – 18; Rebs: Adala Moto – 12; Asts: 2 with 2 Morsell – 16 Pts, 3 Stls

Royal Farms Arena
Baltimore, MD
Attendance: 3,450
Referees: J. Gwynn, J. Nichols, G. Duda

=== Semifinals ===
NBCSN

March 6, 2016
1:00 pm

Recap

#5 William & Mary 67, #1 Hofstra 70
Scoring by half: 34–30, 33–40
Pts: Malinowski – 22; Rebs: Tarpey – 6 Asts: Cohn – 4 Dixon – 10 Pts	Pts: Tanksley – 23; Rebs: Gustys – 13; Asts: Green – 5; 2 with 14 Pts

Royal Farms Arena
Baltimore, MD
Attendance: 3,643
Referees: L. Jones, T. Comer, J. Lindsay

NBCSN

March 6, 2016
3:30 pm

Recap

#6 Northeastern 70, #2 UNC Wilmington 73
Scoring by half: 32–34, 38–39
Pts: Ford – 21; Rebs: Stahl – 13; Asts: 3 with 2; 2 with 16 Pts	Pts: Flemmings – 21; Rebs: Cacok – 7 Asts: Ingram –8; Ingram – 14 Pts

Royal Farms Arena
Baltimore, MD
Attendance: 3,643
Referees: B. Kersey, B. Covington, L. Andrakakos

=== Championship ===
NBCSN

March 7, 2016
7:00 pm

Recap

#2 UNC Wilmington 80, #1 Hofstra 73 (OT)
Scoring by half: 34–41, 34–27 Overtime: 12–5
Pts: Ponder – 20; Rebs: Talley – 7 Asts: Ingram – 6 Flemmings – 19 Pts, 6 Rebs	Pts: Tanksley – 24; Rebs: Gustys – 23; Asts: Green – 8 Gustys – Tournament Record, Rebs

Royal Farms Arena
Baltimore, MD
Attendance: 3,031
Referees: J. Lindsay, E. Corbett, T. Clougherty

== Team and tournament leaders ==
=== Team leaders ===
Team	Points		Rebounds		Assists		Steals		Blocks		Minutes	
College of Charleston	2 Tied	28	Brantley	18	Hulsey	12	Hulsey	10	Johnson	3	Johnson	75
Delaware	Holden	30	Jeffers	8	Holden	2	4 tied	1	Jeffers	3	Hayes	37
Drexel	R. Williams	29	R. Williams	21	Te. Allen	10	Te. Allen	3	3 Tied	2	Te. Allen	71
Elon	Eddy	11	Seibring	7	Seibring	3	Thompson	3	4 Tied	1	Seibring	33
Hofstra	Tanksley	60	Gustys	47	Green	17	Tanksley	4	Green	5	Green	121
James Madison	Curry	20	Curry	11	McLean	4	4 Tied	1	2 Tied	1	Curry	40
Northeastern	Ford	41	Stahl	17	Walker	8	3 Tied	2	4 Tied	1	Walker	78
Towson	Adala Moto	18	Adala Moto	12	Tied	2	Morsell	3	Parker–Rivera	1	Morsell	36
UNC Wilmington	Flemmings	53	Gettys	15	Ingram	17	Flemmings	3	Bryan	6	Flemmings	117
William & Mary	Malinowski	28	2 Tied	10	Cohn	9	2 Tied	4	4 Tied	1	Prewitt	62

== See also ==
- Colonial Athletic Association
- 2016 CAA women's basketball tournament
