= 2015–16 James Madison Dukes men's basketball team =

American college basketball season

2015–16 James Madison Dukes men's basketball
- Conference: Colonial Athletic Association
- Record: 21–11 (11–7 CAA)
- Head coach: Matt Brady (8th season)
- Assistant coaches: Rob O'Driscoll; Mike Deane; Bill Phillips
- Home arena: JMU Convocation Center

2015–16 CAA men's basketball standings
	Conf.				Overall
Team	W		L	PCT	W		L	PCT
Hofstra	14	–	4	.778	24	–	10	.706
UNC Wilmington †	14	–	4	.778	25	–	8	.758
Towson	11	–	7	.611	20	–	13	.606
James Madison	11	–	7	.611	21	–	11	.656
William & Mary	11	–	7	.611	20	–	11	.645
Northeastern	9	–	9	.500	18	–	15	.545
College of Charleston	8	–	10	.444	17	–	14	.548
Elon	7	–	11	.389	16	–	16	.500
Drexel	3	–	15	.167	6	–	25	.194
Delaware	2	–	16	.111	7	–	23	.233
† 2016 CAA tournament winner

The 2015–16 James Madison Dukes men's basketball team represented James Madison University during the 2015–16 NCAA Division I men's basketball season. The Dukes, led by eighth year head coach Matt Brady, played their home games at the James Madison University Convocation Center and were members of the Colonial Athletic Association. James Madison finished the regular season with an 11–7 record in conference, finishing in a tie for third place. The Dukes lost in the quarterfinals of CAA tournament to William & Mary. They finished the season with a 21–11 overall record.

On March 14, 2016, James Madison fired head coach Matt Brady.

== Previous season ==
The Dukes finished the season 19–14, 12–6 in CAA play to finish in a four-way tie for the CAA regular season championship. They lost in the quarterfinals of the CAA tournament to Hofstra. They were invited to the CollegeInsider.com Tournament where they lost in the first round to USC Upstate.

== Departures ==
Name	Number	Pos.	Height	Weight	Year	Hometown	Notes
Shawn Wilbourne	1	G	6'2"	195	RS Sophomore	Fredericksburg, Virginia	Walk-on; didn't return
Dante Sterling	11	G	6'5"	205	Freshman	Fayetteville, Georgia	Transferred to Northwest Florida State College
Andre Nation	15	G	6'5"	200	Junior	Plant City, Florida	Dismissed from the team
Hari Hall	25	F	6'7"	210	Freshman	Jacksonville, Florida	Left the team for personal reasons

== Incoming transfers ==
Name	Number	Pos.	Height	Weight	Year	Hometown	Previous School
Shakir Brown	1	F	6'6"	218	Junior	Baltimore	Angelina College
Ramone Snowden	23	G	6'3"	210	Junior	Virginia Beach, Virginia	Niagara

- Under NCAA transfer rules, Ramone Snowden will have to sit out for the 2015–16 season. Snowden will have two years of remaining eligibility following the 2015–16 season.

== Recruiting ==
College recruiting information
Name	Hometown	School	Height	Weight	Commit date
Kevin Roland; SG	Amelia Court House, Virginia	Amelia Academy	6 ft 2 in (1.88 m)	185 lb (84 kg)	
Kevin Roland; SG	Recruit ratings: Scout: Rivals: (61)				
Overall recruit ranking:
Note: In many cases, Scout, Rivals, 247Sports, On3, and ESPN may conflict in their listings of height and weight.; In these cases, the average was taken. ESPN grades are on a 100-point scale.; Sources: "2015 Team Ranking". Rivals.

== Roster ==
2015–16 James Madison Dukes men's basketball team
Players
Coaches

Pos.	#	Name	Height	Weight	Year	Hometown
G	0	Devontae Morgan	6 ft 4 in (1.93 m)	190 lb (86 kg)	RS Jr	Tampa, Florida
G/F	1	Shakir Brown	6 ft 6 in (1.98 m)	220 lb (100 kg)	Jr	Baltimore
G	2	Ron Curry	6 ft 4 in (1.93 m)	200 lb (91 kg)	Sr	Pennsauken, New Jersey
G	3	Winston Grays	6 ft 2 in (1.88 m)	175 lb (79 kg)	Sr	Cleveland, Ohio
G	4	Joey McLean	6 ft 0 in (1.83 m)	160 lb (73 kg)	So	Greensboro, North Carolina
G	10	Jackson Kent	6 ft 7 in (2.01 m)	200 lb (91 kg)	Jr	High Point, North Carolina
F	12	Paulius Satkus	6 ft 8 in (2.03 m)	230 lb (104 kg)	Jr	Raudondvaris, Lithuania
F	13	Tom Vodanovich	6 ft 8 in (2.03 m)	215 lb (98 kg)	Jr	Wellington, New Zealand
F	21	Dimitrije Cabarkapa	6 ft 10 in (2.08 m)	240 lb (109 kg)	RS Jr	Novi Sad, Serbia
F	23	Ramone Snowden (I) (redshirt)	6 ft 6 in (1.98 m)	225 lb (102 kg)	Jr	Virginia Beach, Virginia
G	31	Matt Risse (W)	6 ft 5 in (1.96 m)	205 lb (93 kg)	RS Fr	Barrington, New Jersey
G	35	Kevin Kangni	6 ft 2 in (1.88 m)	190 lb (86 kg)	Fr	Amelia Courthouse, Virginia
G	40	Yohanny Dalembert	6 ft 8 in (2.03 m)	230 lb (104 kg)	Jr	Port-au-Prince, Haiti
F	55	Ivan Lukic	6 ft 9 in (2.06 m)	225 lb (102 kg)	Jr	Loznica, Serbia

Head coach

- Matt Brady (Siena)

Assistant coach(es)

- Rob O'Driscoll (Villanova)
- Mike Deane (SUNY Potsdam)
- Bill Phillips (Saint Joseph's)

Legend

- (C) Team captain
- (S) Suspended
- (I) Ineligible
- (W) Walk-on
- Injured
- Current redshirt

Roster

== Schedule ==
Date time, TV	Rank^{#}	Opponent^{#}	Result	Record	Site (attendance) city, state
Non-conference regular season
11/13/2015*; 7:00 pm		Richmond	W 87–75	1–0	JMU Convocation Center (7,201); Harrisonburg, Virginia
11/16/2015*; 7:00 pm		vs. West Virginia; Charleston Showcase	L 73–86	1–1	Charleston Civic Center (8,101); Charleston, West Virginia
11/20/2015*; 3:30 pm		FIU; Men Against Breast Cancer Classic	W 64–61	2–1	JMU Convocation Center (2,457); Harrisonburg, Virginia
11/21/2015*; 7:30 pm		Oral Roberts; Men Against Breast Cancer Classic	L 64–74	2–2	JMU Convocation Center (2,628); Harrisonburg, Virginia
11/22/2015*; 3:30 pm		Tennessee–Martin; Men Against Breast Cancer Classic	L 75–78	2–3	JMU Convocation Center (2,292); Harrisonburg, Virginia
11/24/2015*; 7:00 pm		Eastern Mennonite; Men Against Breast Cancer Classic	W 106–74	3–3	JMU Convocation Center (2,655); Harrisonburg, Virginia
11/27/2015*; 7:00 pm		at Marshall	W 89–75	4–3	Cam Henderson Center (4,683); Huntington, West Virginia
11/30/2015*; 7:00 pm		at Radford	W 70–68	5–3	Dedmon Center (3,107); Radford, Virginia
12/03/2015*; 7:00 pm		Western Michigan	W 63–57	6–3	JMU Convocation Center (2,660); Harrisonburg, Virginia
12/06/2015*; 2:00 pm		Marshall	W 107–84	7–3	JMU Convocation Center (3,404); Harrisonburg, Virginia
12/12/2015*; 4:00 pm		George Mason	W 69–46	8–3	JMU Convocation Center (3,856); Harrisonburg, Virginia
12/20/2015*; 2:00 pm		East Carolina	W 67–61	9–3	JMU Convocation Center (2,510); Harrisonburg, Virginia
12/22/2015*; 7:00 pm		Mount St. Mary's	W 73–53	10–3	JMU Convocation Center (2,291); Harrisonburg, Virginia
CAA regular season
12/31/2015; 1:00 pm		College of Charleston	W 65–62	10–4 (0–1)	JMU Convocation Center (2,495); Harrisonburg, Virginia
01/02/2016; 12:00 pm, CSN		at Delaware	L 63–73	11–4 (1–1)	Bob Carpenter Center (2,886); Newark, Delaware
01/07/2016; 7:00 pm		Elon	L 73–79	11–5 (1–2)	JMU Convocation Center (2,300); Harrisonburg, Virginia
01/09/2016; 4:00 pm		Towson	W 73–59	12–5 (2–2)	JMU Convocation Center (3,197); Harrisonburg, Virginia
01/14/2016; 7:00 pm, CSN		at Northeastern	W 75–63	13–5 (3–2)	Matthews Arena (1,944); Boston
01/16/2016; 4:00 pm		at Hofstra	W 86–82 ^{OT}	14–5 (4–2)	Mack Sports Complex (1,687); Hempstead, New York
01/21/2016; 7:00 pm		Drexel	W 68–45	15–5 (5–2)	JMU Convocation Center (2,807); Harrisonburg, Virginia
01/23/2016; 7:00 pm		at Elon	W 82–64	16–5 (6–2)	Alumni Gym (1,248); Elon, North Carolina
01/28/2016; 7:00 pm		UNC Wilmington	L 73–78	16–6 (6–3)	JMU Convocation Center (3,107); Harrisonburg, Virginia
01/31/2016; 7:00 pm, CSN		at William & Mary	L 62–68	16–7 (6–4)	Kaplan Arena (3,681); Williamsburg, Virginia
02/04/2016; 7:00 pm		at Drexel	W 78–56	17–7 (7–4)	Daskalakis Athletic Center (1,107); Philadelphia
02/06/2016; 3:00 pm, CSN		Hofstra	W 98–95 ^{OT}	18–7 (8–4)	JMU Convocation Center (3,047); Harrisonburg, Virginia
02/11/2016; 7:30 pm		at College of Charleston	W 56–52	19–7 (9–4)	TD Arena (3,023); Charleston, South Carolina
02/13/2016; 3:00 pm, NBCSN		at UNC Wilmington	L 68–78	19–8 (9–5)	Trask Coliseum (5,100); Wilmington, North Carolina
02/18/2016; 7:00 pm		Northeastern	L 94–95 ^{3OT}	19–9 (9–6)	JMU Convocation Center (3,152); Harrisonburg, Virginia
02/20/2016; 4:00 pm, CSN		Delaware	W 75–50	20–9 (10–6)	JMU Convocation Center (5,522); Harrisonburg, Virginia
02/25/2016; 8:00 pm, CSN		at Towson	L 67–69	20–10 (10–7)	SECU Arena (2,546); Towson, Maryland
02/27/2016; 2:30 pm, NBCSN		William & Mary	W 71–65	21–10 (11–7)	JMU Convocation Center (3,646); Harrisonburg, Virginia
CAA tournament
03/05/2016; 2:30 pm, CSN		vs. William & Mary; Quarterfinals	L 64–79	21–11	Royal Farms Arena (3,904); Baltimore
*Non-conference game. ^{#}Rankings from AP Poll. (#) Tournament seedings in parentheses. All times are in Eastern Time.

== See also ==
2015–16 James Madison Dukes women's basketball team
