= 2015–16 Hofstra Pride men's basketball team =

American college basketball season

2015–16 Hofstra Pride men's basketball

CAA regular season co–champions

NIT, First Round
- Conference: Colonial Athletic Association
- Record: 24–10 (14–4 CAA)
- Head coach: Joe Mihalich (3rd season)
- Assistant coaches: Mike Farrelly; Speedy Claxton; Akbar Waheed; Colin Curtin
- Home arena: Mack Sports Complex

2015–16 CAA men's basketball standings
	Conf.				Overall
Team	W		L	PCT	W		L	PCT
Hofstra	14	–	4	.778	24	–	10	.706
UNC Wilmington †	14	–	4	.778	25	–	8	.758
Towson	11	–	7	.611	20	–	13	.606
James Madison	11	–	7	.611	21	–	11	.656
William & Mary	11	–	7	.611	20	–	11	.645
Northeastern	9	–	9	.500	18	–	15	.545
College of Charleston	8	–	10	.444	17	–	14	.548
Elon	7	–	11	.389	16	–	16	.500
Drexel	3	–	15	.167	6	–	25	.194
Delaware	2	–	16	.111	7	–	23	.233
† 2016 CAA tournament winner

The 2015–16 Hofstra Pride men's basketball team represented Hofstra University during the 2015–16 NCAA Division I men's basketball season. The Pride, led by third year head coach Joe Mihalich, played their home games at Mack Sports Complex and were members of the Colonial Athletic Association. They finished the season 24–10, 14–4 in CAA play to finish in a tie for the CAA championship with UNC Wilmington. They advanced to the championship game of the CAA tournament, where they lost to UNC Wilmington. As a regular season champion who failed to win their league tournament, they received an automatic bid to the National Invitation Tournament, where they lost in the first round to George Washington.

== Previous season ==
The Pride finished the season 20–14, 10–8 in CAA play to finish in fifth place. They advanced to the semifinals of the CAA tournament where they lost to William & Mary. They were invited to the College Basketball Invitational where they lost in the first round to Vermont.

== Departures ==
Name	Number	Pos.	Height	Weight	Year	Hometown	Notes
Daryl Fowlkes	3	G	6'1"	170	Junior	Fort Washington, Maryland	Walk-on; didn't return
Eliel Gonzalez	30	G	6'3"	200	Freshman	Cayey, Puerto Rico	Transferred to Mississippi Gulf Coast Community College

=== Incoming transfers ===
College recruiting
Name	Hometown	School	Height	Weight	Commit date
Denton Koon; F	Liberty, Missouri	Princeton University	6 ft 8 in (2.03 m)	210 lb (95 kg)	Apr 28, 2015
Denton Koon; F	Recruit ratings: Scout: Rivals: 247Sports: (N/A)				
Hunter Sabety; F	Oceanside, New York	Tufts University	6 ft 8 in (2.03 m)	250 lb (110 kg)	Jun 2, 2015
Hunter Sabety; F	Recruit ratings: Scout: Rivals: 247Sports: (N/A)				
Deron Powers; G	Williamsburg, Virginia	Hampton University	5 ft 11 in (1.80 m)	165 lb (75 kg)	Aug 14, 2015
Deron Powers; G	Recruit ratings: Scout: Rivals: 247Sports: (N/A)				
Overall recruit ranking:
Note: In many cases, Scout, Rivals, 247Sports, On3, and ESPN may conflict in their listings of height and weight.; In these cases, the average was taken. ESPN grades are on a 100-point scale.; Sources: "2014 Team Ranking". Rivals.

=== 2015 recruiting class ===
College recruiting
Name	Hometown	School	Height	Weight	Commit date
Justin Wright-Foreman; G	Laurelton, New York	High School for Construction Trades, Engineering and Architecture	6 ft 1 in (1.85 m)	170 lb (77 kg)	Oct 1, 2014
Justin Wright-Foreman; G	Recruit ratings: Scout: Rivals: 247Sports: ESPN: (70)				
Desure Buie; G	Bronx, New York	Wings Academy	6 ft 0 in (1.83 m)	155 lb (70 kg)	Oct 24, 2014
Desure Buie; G	Recruit ratings: Scout: Rivals: 247Sports: ESPN: (68)				
Overall recruit ranking:
Note: In many cases, Scout, Rivals, 247Sports, On3, and ESPN may conflict in their listings of height and weight.; In these cases, the average was taken. ESPN grades are on a 100-point scale.; Sources: "2014 Team Ranking". Rivals.

== Roster ==
2015–16 Hofstra Pride men's basketball team
Players
Coaches

Pos.	#	Name	Height	Weight	Year	Hometown
G/F	0	Malik Nichols	6 ft 6 in (1.98 m)	210 lb (95 kg)	Sr	Queens, New York
G	1	Juan'ya Green	6 ft 2 in (1.88 m)	195 lb (88 kg)	RS Sr	Philadelphia
G/F	2	Ameen Tanksley	6 ft 5 in (1.96 m)	230 lb (104 kg)	RS Sr	Philadelphia
G	3	Justin Wright-Foreman	6 ft 0 in (1.83 m)	181 lb (82 kg)	Fr	Laurelton, New York
G	4	Desure Buie	6 ft 0 in (1.83 m)	155 lb (70 kg)	Fr	Bronx, New York
F	11	Rokas Gustys	6 ft 9 in (2.06 m)	260 lb (118 kg)	So	Kaunas, Lithuania
F	12	Denton Koon	6 ft 8 in (2.03 m)	210 lb (95 kg)	RS Sr	Liberty, Missouri
G	14	Brian Bernardi	6 ft 2 in (1.88 m)	195 lb (88 kg)	RS Jr	Staten Island, New York
G	15	Deron Powers (redshirt)	6 ft 0 in (1.83 m)	165 lb (75 kg)	Sr	Williamsburg, Virginia
G/F	20	Jamall Robinson	6 ft 5 in (1.96 m)	205 lb (93 kg)	Jr	Cheltenham, Maryland
F	33	Hunter Sabety (redshirt)	6 ft 8 in (2.03 m)	250 lb (113 kg)	Jr	Oceanside, New York
F/C	42	Ibrahim Djambo	6 ft 10 in (2.08 m)	215 lb (98 kg)	RS Sr	Bamako, Mali
F/C	44	Andre Walker	6 ft 10 in (2.08 m)	230 lb (104 kg)	So	Clarksburg, Maryland

Head coach

- Joe Mihalich (La Salle)

Assistant coach(es)

- Mike Farrelly (Saint Joseph's)
- Speedy Claxton (Hofstra)
- Akbar Waheed (Niagara)
- Colin Curtin (Niagara)

Legend

- (C) Team captain
- (S) Suspended
- (I) Ineligible
- (W) Walk-on
- Injured
- Current redshirt

Roster

== Schedule ==
Date time, TV	Rank^{#}	Opponent^{#}	Result	Record	High points	High rebounds	High assists	Site (attendance) city, state
Non-conference regular season
November 13*; 7:00 pm		Canisius	W 96–85	1–0	26 – Bernardi	10 – Gustys	11 – Green	Mack Sports Complex (2,106); Hempstead, New York
November 16*; 7:00 pm		Molloy	W 96–64	2–0	17 – Tied	17 – Gustys	8 – Green	Mack Sports Complex (897); Hempstead, New York
November 20*; 6:30 pm, CBSSN		vs. Florida State; Paradise Jam Quarterfinals	W 82–77	3–0	24 – Bernardi	11 – Gustys	7 – Green	Sports and Fitness Center (1,522); St. Thomas, VI
November 22*; 9:00 pm, CBSSN		vs. South Carolina; Paradise Jam semifinals	L 84–94	3–1	28 – Green	6 – Gustys	7 – Green	Sports and Fitness Center (1,715); St. Thomas, VI
November 23*; 6:30 pm, CBSSN		vs. Indiana State; Paradise Jam 3rd place game	L 66–67	3–2	18 – Green	12 – Nichols	3 – Tied	Sports and Fitness Center; St. Thomas, VI
November 28*; 4:00 pm		at St. Bonaventure	W 89–83	4–2	24 – Tanksley	11 – Nichols	9 – Green	Reilly Center (3,229); Olean, New York
December 2*; 7:00 pm		at La Salle	W 84–80	5–2	22 – Bernardi	10 – Koon	8 – Green	Tom Gola Arena (1,712); Philadelphia
December 6*; 1:25 pm		vs. Appalachian State; MSG Holiday Festival	W 86–80	6–2	23 – Bernardi	12 – Gustys	6 – Green	Madison Square Garden (7,196); New York City
December 9*; 7:00 pm, ESPN3		at Siena	L 68–81	6–3	22 – Tanksley	8 – Tied	4 – Green	Times Union Center (5,099); Albany, New York
December 20*; 7:00 pm		at Stony Brook	L 68–71	6–4	23 – Tanksley	13 – Gustys	4 – Koon	Island Federal Credit Union Arena (3,334); Stony Brook, New York
December 22*; 7:00 pm		Florida Atlantic	W 68–54	7–4	20 – Tanksley	11 – Tied	4 – Green	Mack Sports Complex (961); Hempstead, New York
December 28*; 7:00 pm		Sacred Heart	W 80–73	8–4	22 – Green	10 – Gustys	6 – Green	Mack Sports Complex (1,313); Hempstead, New York
CAA regular season
December 31; 1:00 pm		Delaware	W 90–80	9–4 (1–0)	19 – Green	9 – Gustys	11 – Green	Mack Sports Complex (1,293); Hempstead, New York
January 2; 7:00 pm		at Towson	W 90–58	10–4 (2–0)	21 – Bernardi	11 – Gustys	7 – Green	SECU Arena (2,331); Towson, Maryland
January 7; 7:00 pm		at College of Charleston	L 61–72	10–5 (2–1)	16 – Tanksley	10 – Gustys	5 – Green	TD Arena (3,407); Charleston, South Carolina
January 9; 6:00 pm, ASN		at Elon	W 80–76	11–5 (3–1)	19 – Gustys	12 – Gustys	7 – Green	Alumni Gym (1,419); Elon, North Carolina
January 14; 7:00 pm		Drexel	W 69–61	12–5 (4–1)	25 – Green	13 – Koon	5 – Green	Mack Sports Complex (1,102); Hempstead, New York
January 16; 4:00 pm		James Madison	L 82–86 ^{OT}	12–6 (4–2)	25 – Gustys	20 – Gustys	9 – Green	Mack Sports Complex (1,687); Hempstead, New York
January 21; 8:00 pm, SNY		at Northeastern	W 96–92 ^{3OT}	13–6 (5–2)	23 – Tied	20 – Gustys	14 – Green	Matthews Arena (1,359); Boston
January 24; 12:00 pm, SNY		William & Mary	W 91–63	14–6 (6–2)	30 – Green	11 – Gustys	7 – Green	Mack Sports Complex (894); Hempstead, New York
January 28; 7:00 pm		Elon	W 66–64	15–6 (7–2)	23 – Gustys	19 – Gustys	6 – Green	Mack Sports Complex (1,125); Hempstead, New York
January 30; 4:00 pm, SNY		at Drexel	W 70–64	16–6 (8–2)	15 – Tied	12 – Gustys	5 – Green	Daskalakis Athletic Center (1,510); Philadelphia
February 4; 7:00 pm		UNC Wilmington	L 67–70	16–7 (8–3)	21 – Green	21 – Gustys	5 – Green	Mack Sports Complex (2,057); Hempstead, New York
February 7; 3:00 pm, SNY		at James Madison	L 95–98	16–8 (8–4)	22 – Bernardi	18 – Gustys	8 – Green	JMU Convocation Center (3,047); Harrisonburg, Virginia
February 11; 7:00 pm		at William & Mary	W 86–80	17–8 (9–4)	25 – Gustys	15 – Gustys	12 – Green	Kaplan Arena (3,259); Williamsburg, Virginia
February 13; 5:00 pm, NBCSN		at Delaware	W 77–66	18–8 (10–4)	19 – Green	21 – Gustys	12 – Green	Bob Carpenter Center (2,622); Newark, Delaware
February 18; 7:00 pm		Towson	W 84–82	19–8 (11–4)	21 – Green	12 – Gustys	10 – Green	Mack Sports Complex (1,958); Hempstead, New York
February 21; 2:00 pm, NBCSN		Northeastern	W 65–60	20–8 (12–4)	19 – Koon	16 – Gustys	8 – Green	Mack Sports Complex (3,030); Hempstead, New York
February 25; 7:00 pm		at UNC Wilmington	W 70–69	21–8 (13–4)	18 – Tied	21 – Gustys	2 – Bernardi	Trask Coliseum (4,752); Wilmington, North Carolina
February 27; 4:00 pm, ASN		College of Charleston	W 72–63	22–8 (14–4)	17 – Green	14 – Gustys	10 – Green	Mack Sports Complex (3,478); Hempstead, New York
CAA tournament
March 5; 12:00 pm, CSN	(1)	vs. (9) Drexel; Quarterfinals	W 80–67	23–8	22 – Green	11 – Gustys	4 – Green	Royal Farms Arena (3,904); Baltimore
March 6; 1:00 pm, NBCSN	(1)	vs. (5) William & Mary; Semifinals	W 70–67	24–8	23 – Tanksley	13 – Gustys	5 – Green	Royal Farms Arena (3,643); Baltimore
March 7; 12:00 pm, NBCSN	(1)	vs. (2) UNC Wilmington; Championship game	L 73–80 ^{OT}	24–9	24 – Tanksley	23 – Gustys	8 – Green	Royal Farms Arena (3,031); Baltimore
NIT
March 16*; 12:00 pm, ESPN3	(5)	at (4) George Washington; First round – Monmouth Bracket	L 80–82	24–10	26 – Green	13 – Gustys	10 – Green	Charles E. Smith Center (1,083); Washington, D.C.
*Non-conference game. ^{#}Rankings from AP. (#) Tournament seedings in parentheses. All times are in Eastern Time.

== See also ==
2015–16 Hofstra Pride women's basketball team
