= 2015–16 William & Mary Tribe men's basketball team =

American college basketball season

2015–16 William & Mary Tribe men's basketball
- Conference: Colonial Athletic Association
- Record: 20–11 (11–7 CAA)
- Head coach: Tony Shaver (13th season)
- Assistant coaches: Jonathan Holmes; Kotie Kimble; Austin Shaver
- Home arena: Kaplan Arena

2015–16 CAA men's basketball standings
	Conf.				Overall
Team	W		L	PCT	W		L	PCT
Hofstra	14	–	4	.778	24	–	10	.706
UNC Wilmington †	14	–	4	.778	25	–	8	.758
Towson	11	–	7	.611	20	–	13	.606
James Madison	11	–	7	.611	21	–	11	.656
William & Mary	11	–	7	.611	20	–	11	.645
Northeastern	9	–	9	.500	18	–	15	.545
College of Charleston	8	–	10	.444	17	–	14	.548
Elon	7	–	11	.389	16	–	16	.500
Drexel	3	–	15	.167	6	–	25	.194
Delaware	2	–	16	.111	7	–	23	.233
† 2016 CAA tournament winner

The 2015–16 William & Mary Tribe men's basketball team represented the College of William & Mary during the 2015–16 NCAA Division I men's basketball season. The Tribe were led by thirteenth year head coach Tony Shaver. The team played its home games at Kaplan Arena and remained members of the Colonial Athletic Association (CAA). This was the 111th season of the collegiate basketball program at William & Mary. They finished the season 20–11, 11–7 in CAA play to finish in a three way tie for third place. They advanced to the semifinals of the CAA tournament where they lost Hofstra. Despite again securing twenty wins for the season, the Tribe failed to secure back-to-back postseason tournament bids for the first time in program history. Along with the 2013–14 and 2014–15 seasons, this was only the second time in program history that William & Mary won twenty games during three consecutive seasons.

== Previous season ==
The team tried to improve upon their 20–13 (12–6 CAA) record from the 2014–15 season that saw the team fall short, for the second straight year, of a conference championship with a 61–72 loss to Northeastern in the championship game of the 2015 CAA men's basketball tournament. The Tribe ultimately received an automatic bid to the National Invitation Tournament, where they lost in the first round to Tulsa. The Tribe also saw the graduation of the program's all-time leading scorer, Marcus Thornton. Thornton, who was drafted by the Boston Celtics in the second round of the 2015 NBA draft, is currently playing for the Sydney Kings in the Australian National Basketball League.

== Departures ==
Name	Number	Pos.	Height	Weight	Year	Hometown	Notes
Tom Schalk	43	F	6'8"	200	Senior	Burnsville, Minnesota	Graduated
Marcus Thornton	3	G	6'4"	185	Senior	Upper Marlboro, Maryland	Graduated/2015 NBA draft

== Recruiting Class of 2015 ==
College recruiting information
Name	Hometown	School	Height	Weight	Commit date
Hunter Seacat; SF	Mooresville, North Carolina	Lake Norman High School	6 ft 9 in (2.06 m)	220 lb (100 kg)	Sep 8, 2014
Hunter Seacat; SF	Recruit ratings: Scout: Rivals: (NR)				
Overall recruit ranking:
Note: In many cases, Scout, Rivals, 247Sports, On3, and ESPN may conflict in their listings of height and weight.; In these cases, the average was taken. ESPN grades are on a 100-point scale.; Sources: "2015 Team Ranking". Rivals.

== Roster ==
2015–16 William & Mary Tribe men's basketball team
Players
Coaches

Pos.	#	Name	Height	Weight	Year	Previous school	Hometown
G	0	Daniel Dixon	6 ft 5 in (1.96 m)	200 lb (91 kg)	Jr	Langley/Fishburne	Great Falls, Virginia
G	1	Jamison Glover	6 ft 0 in (1.83 m)	185 lb (84 kg)	So	Battlefield	Haymarket, Virginia
G/F	4	Omar Prewitt	6 ft 6 in (1.98 m)	190 lb (86 kg)	Jr	Montgomery County	Mount Sterling, Kentucky
G/F	5	Greg Malinowski	6 ft 5 in (1.96 m)	205 lb (93 kg)	So	Episcopal	Chantilly, Virginia
G	10	Connor Burchfield	6 ft 4 in (1.93 m)	175 lb (79 kg)	So	Concord	Concord, North Carolina
G	11	Michael Schlotman	6 ft 4 in (1.93 m)	195 lb (88 kg)	RS So	Munster	Munster, Indiana
G	21	Oliver Tot	6 ft 6 in (1.98 m)	200 lb (91 kg)	So	Kimball Union Academy	Bratislava, Slovakia
F	22	Paul Rowley	6 ft 8 in (2.03 m)	190 lb (86 kg)	RS Fr	Loudoun Valley	Purcellville, Virginia
G/F	25	Terry Tarpey	6 ft 5 in (1.96 m)	210 lb (95 kg)	Sr	Fairfield Prep	Stamford, Connecticut
F	31	Sean Shelton	6 ft 9 in (2.06 m)	256 lb (116 kg)	Sr	Saint Francis Catholic	Traverse City, Michigan
G	34	David Cohn	6 ft 2 in (1.88 m)	170 lb (77 kg)	So	York; Colorado State	Elmhurst, Illinois
F	41	Jack Whitman	6 ft 9 in (2.06 m)	235 lb (107 kg)	So	Lexington Catholic	Lexington, Kentucky
F	50	Hunter Seacat	6 ft 9 in (2.06 m)	215 lb (98 kg)	Fr	Lake Norman	Mooresville, North Carolina

Head coach

- Tony Shaver (North Carolina)

Assistant coach(es)

- Jonathan Holmes (North Carolina)
- Kotie Kimble (Coastal Carolina)
- Austin Shaver (Virginia)

Legend

- (C) Team captain
- (S) Suspended
- (I) Ineligible
- (W) Walk-on
- Injured
- Current redshirt

Roster

== Schedule ==
Date time, TV	Rank^{#}	Opponent^{#}	Result	Record	Site (attendance) city, state
Non-conference regular season
November 13, 2015*; 8:00 pm, ESPN3		at NC State	W 86–68	1–0	PNC Arena (16,377); Raleigh, North Carolina
November 17, 2015*; 7:00 pm, ESPN3		at Liberty	W 70–59	2–0	Vines Center (2,102); Lynchburg, Virginia
November 19, 2015*; 7:00 pm		Washington Adventist	W 85–60	3–0	Kaplan Arena (1,822); Williamsburg, Virginia
November 21, 2015*; 2:00 pm		at Dayton	L 66–69	3–1	UD Arena (12,796); Dayton, Ohio
November 25, 2015*; 7:00 pm		Hampton	W 86–67	4–1	Kaplan Arena (2,330); Williamsburg, Virginia
November 28, 2015*; 4:00 pm		at Howard	L 77–79	4–2	Burr Gymnasium (954); Washington, D.C.
December 1, 2015*; 7:00 pm		Old Dominion; Rivalry	W 55–48	5–2	Kaplan Arena (3,256); Williamsburg, Virginia
December 5, 2015*; 2:00 pm, RSN/ESPN3		at No. 10 Virginia	L 52–67	5–3	John Paul Jones Arena (14,105); Charlottesville, Virginia
December 18, 2015*; 7:00 pm		Mary Washington	W 94–64	6–3	Kaplan Arena (1,462); Williamsburg, Virginia
December 21, 2015*; 7:00 pm		High Point	W 78–75 ^{OT}	7–3	Kaplan Arena (1,388); Williamsburg, Virginia
December 29, 2015*; 7:30 pm		Central Michigan	W 88–84	8–3	Kaplan Arena (3,313); Williamsburg, Virginia
CAA regular season
December 31, 2015; 4:00 pm		Towson	L 69–76	8–4 (0–1)	Kaplan Arena (2,531); Williamsburg, Virginia
January 2, 2016; 4:00 pm		College of Charleston	W 78–70	9–4 (1–1)	Kaplan Arena (2,873); Williamsburg, Virginia
January 7, 2016; 7:00 pm		at Drexel	W 72–63	10–4 (2–1)	Daskalakis Athletic Center (1,107); Philadelphia
January 9, 2016; 4:00 pm		Northeastern	W 78-60	11-4 (3-1)	Kaplan Arena (3,626); Williamsburg, Virginia
January 14, 2016; 7:00 pm		at College of Charleston	W 63–61	12–4 (4–1)	TD Arena (3,069); Charleston, South Carolina
January 16, 2016; 2:00 pm, ASN		at UNC Wilmington	L 94–97 ^{OT}	12–5 (4–2)	Trask Coliseum (4,211); Wilmington, North Carolina
January 21, 2016; 7:00 pm		Elon	W 89–67	13–5 (5–2)	Kaplan Arena (3,278); Williamsburg, Virginia
January 23, 2016; 4:00 pm, CSN		at Hofstra	L 63–91	13–6 (5–3)	Mack Sports Complex (894); Hempstead, New York
January 28, 2016; 7:00 pm		at Delaware	W 94–79	14–6 (6–3)	Bob Carpenter Center (2,311); Newark, Delaware
January 30, 2016; 4:00 pm, CSN		James Madison	W 68–62	15–6 (7–3)	Kaplan Arena (3,681); Williamsburg, Virginia
February 4, 2016; 7:00 pm, CSN		at Northeastern	W 86–77	16–6 (8–3)	Matthews Arena (1,416); Boston
February 6, 2016; 2:30 pm, NBCSN		Delaware; Gold Rush/Charter Day	W 90–64	17–6 (9–3)	Kaplan Arena (6,028); Williamsburg, Virginia
February 11, 2016; 7:00 pm		Hofstra	L 80-86	17–7 (9–4)	Kaplan Arena (3,259); Williamsburg, Virginia
February 13, 2016; 4:00 pm, CSN		at Towson	L 82–99	17–8 (9–5)	SECU Arena (2,334); Towson, Maryland
February 18, 2016; 7:00 pm		UNC Wilmington	W 87–69	18–8 (10–5)	Kaplan Arena (3,148); Williamsburg, Virginia
February 20, 2016; 4:00 pm, CSN		Drexel	L 69–74	18–9 (10–6)	Kaplan Arena (3,948); Williamsburg, Virginia
February 25, 2016; 7:00 pm		at Elon	W 75–65	19–9 (11–6)	Alumni Gym (1,632); Elon, North Carolina
February 27, 2016; 2:30 pm, NBCSN		at James Madison	L 65–71	19–10 (11–7)	JMU Convocation Center (3,646); Harrisonburg, Virginia
CAA Tournament
March 5, 2016; 2:30 pm, CSN		vs. James Madison; Quarterfinals	W 79–64	20–10	Royal Farms Arena (3,904); Baltimore
March 6, 2016; 1:00 pm, NBCSN		vs. Hofstra; Semifinals	L 67–70	20–11	Royal Farms Arena (3,643); Baltimore
*Non-conference game. ^{#}Rankings from AP Poll. (#) Tournament seedings in parentheses. All times are in Eastern Time.

== See also ==
- 2015–16 William & Mary Tribe women's basketball team
