= 2015–16 Northeastern Huskies men's basketball team =

American college basketball season

2015–16 Northeastern Huskies men's basketball
- Conference: Colonial Athletic Association
- Record: 18–15 (9–9 CAA)
- Head coach: Bill Coen (10th season)
- Assistant coaches: David McLaughlin; Chris Markwood; Brian McDonald
- Home arena: Matthews Arena

2015–16 CAA men's basketball standings
	Conf.				Overall
Team	W		L	PCT	W		L	PCT
Hofstra	14	–	4	.778	24	–	10	.706
UNC Wilmington †	14	–	4	.778	25	–	8	.758
Towson	11	–	7	.611	20	–	13	.606
James Madison	11	–	7	.611	21	–	11	.656
William & Mary	11	–	7	.611	20	–	11	.645
Northeastern	9	–	9	.500	18	–	15	.545
College of Charleston	8	–	10	.444	17	–	14	.548
Elon	7	–	11	.389	16	–	16	.500
Drexel	3	–	15	.167	6	–	25	.194
Delaware	2	–	16	.111	7	–	23	.233
† 2016 CAA tournament winner

The 2015–16 Northeastern Huskies men's basketball team represented Northeastern University during the 2015–16 NCAA Division I men's basketball season. The Huskies, led by tenth year head coach Bill Coen, played their home games at Matthews Arena and were members of the Colonial Athletic Association. They finished the season 18–15, 9–9 in CAA play to finish in sixth place. They advanced to the semifinals of the CAA tournament where they lost to UNC Wilmington.

== Previous season ==
The Huskies finished the 2014–15 season 23–12, 12–6 in CAA play to finish in a four-way tie for the CAA regular season championship. They defeated Delaware, UNC Wilmington, and William & Mary to become champions of the CAA tournament. As a result, they received the conference's automatic bid to the NCAA tournament, their first NCAA bid since 1991, where they lost in the second round to Notre Dame.

== Departures ==
Name	Number	Pos.	Height	Weight	Year	Hometown	Notes
C. J. Hill	22	G	6'2"	184	RS Freshman	Centerville, Virginia	Transferred to Louisburg College
Scott Eatherton	43	F	6'8"	219	RS Senior	Hershey, Pennsylvania	Graduated
Reggie Spencer	44	F	6'7"	234	Senior	Tuscaloosa, Alabama	Graduated

== Recruiting ==
College recruiting information
Name	Hometown	School	Height	Weight	Commit date
Jeremy Miller; PF	Milton, Massachusetts	New Hampton School	6 ft 9 in (2.06 m)	200 lb (91 kg)	Oct 18, 2014
Jeremy Miller; PF	Recruit ratings: Scout: Rivals: (73)				
Brandon Kamga; SF	Reston, Virginia	South Lakes High School	6 ft 5 in (1.96 m)	210 lb (95 kg)	Oct 6, 2014
Brandon Kamga; SF	Recruit ratings: Scout: Rivals: (67)				
Sajon Ford; PF	Saint Petersburg, Florida	Gibbs High School	6 ft 9 in (2.06 m)	190 lb (86 kg)	Sep 17, 2014
Sajon Ford; PF	Recruit ratings: Scout: Rivals: (65)				
Anthony Green; C	Quincy, Massachusetts	Tilton School	6 ft 9 in (2.06 m)	255 lb (116 kg)	Oct 7, 2014
Anthony Green; C	Recruit ratings: Scout: Rivals: (63)				
Donnell Gresham; PG	Saint Paul, Minnesota	Cretin-Derham Hall High School	6 ft 0 in (1.83 m)	180 lb (82 kg)	Oct 6, 2014
Donnell Gresham; PG	Recruit ratings: Scout: Rivals: (NR)				
Overall recruit ranking:
Note: In many cases, Scout, Rivals, 247Sports, On3, and ESPN may conflict in their listings of height and weight.; In these cases, the average was taken. ESPN grades are on a 100-point scale.; Sources: "2015 Team Ranking". Rivals.

== Roster ==
2015–16 Northeastern Huskies men's basketball team
Players
Coaches

Pos.	#	Name	Height	Weight	Year	Previous school	Hometown
G	0	Brandon Kamga	6 ft 5 in (1.96 m)	215 lb (98 kg)	Fr	South Lakes	Reston, Virginia
G/F	3	Jimmy Marshall	6 ft 7 in (2.01 m)	195 lb (88 kg)	Jr	Douglas S. Freeman	Richmond, Virginia
G	4	David Walker	6 ft 6 in (1.98 m)	196 lb (89 kg)	Sr	Stow-Munroe Falls	Stow, Ohio
G	10	T. J. Williams	6 ft 3 in (1.91 m)	201 lb (91 kg)	Jr	Pflugerville	Pflugerville, Texas
F	11	Jeremy Miller	6 ft 10 in (2.08 m)	232 lb (105 kg)	Fr	New Hampton School	Milton, Massachusetts
G/F	12	Quincy Ford	6 ft 8 in (2.03 m)	225 lb (102 kg)	RS Sr	Gibbs	St. Petersburg, Florida
G	15	Caleb Donnelly	6 ft 1 in (1.85 m)	181 lb (82 kg)	RS Sr	Alvirne	Hudson, New Hampshire
G	20	Devon Begley	6 ft 4 in (1.93 m)	186 lb (84 kg)	So	Pearland	Pearland, Texas
F	21	Sajon Ford	6 ft 11 in (2.11 m)	215 lb (98 kg)	Fr	Gibbs	St. Petersburg, Florida
G	22	Donnell Gresham, Jr.	6 ft 1 in (1.85 m)	195 lb (88 kg)	Fr	Cretin-Derham Hall	Maplewood, Minnesota
C	30	Anthony Green	6 ft 10 in (2.08 m)	270 lb (122 kg)	Fr	Tilton School	Quincy, Massachusetts
G	33	Zach Stahl	6 ft 5 in (1.96 m)	215 lb (98 kg)	Sr	Hopkins	Chanhassen, Minnesota
F	34	Kwesi Abakah	6 ft 8 in (2.03 m)	212 lb (96 kg)	RS Jr	North Gwinnett	Suwanee, Georgia

Head coach

- Bill Coen (Hamilton College)

Assistant coach(es)

- David McLaughlin (Colby College)
- Chris Markwood (Maine)
- Brian McDonald (Northeastern)

Legend

- (C) Team captain
- (S) Suspended
- (I) Ineligible
- (W) Walk-on
- Injured
- Current redshirt

Roster

== Schedule ==
Date time, TV	Rank^{#}	Opponent^{#}	Result	Record	Site (attendance) city, state
Non-conference regular season
11/13/2015*; 7:00 pm		at Boston University	W 87–84	1–0	Case Gym (1,256); Boston
11/17/2015*; 7:00 pm		Wentworth; Men Against Breast Cancer Classic	W 91–62	2–0	Cabot Center (1,798); Boston
11/20/2015*; 5:00 pm		vs. Florida Atlantic; Men Against Breast Cancer Classic	W 60–58	3–0	Millett Hall (1,255); Oxford, Ohio
11/21/2015*; 1:30 pm		vs. Lipscomb; Men Against Breast Cancer Classic	W 79–67	4–0	Millett Hall (1,196); Oxford, Ohio
11/22/2015*; 2:00 pm, ESPN3		at Miami (OH); Men Against Breast Cancer Classic	L 61–67	4–1	Millett Hall (1,174); Oxford, Ohio
11/27/2015*; 4:00 pm, ESPN3		at No. 15 Miami (FL)	W 78–77	5–1	BankUnited Center (6,635); Coral Gables, Florida
12/02/2015*; 7:00 pm		Harvard	W 80–71	6–1	Matthews Arena (2,383); Boston
12/05/2015*; 3:00 pm, ESPN3		at Detroit	L 73–76	6–2	Calihan Hall (1,733); Detroit
12/07/2015*; 7:00 pm, ESPN3		at Western Michigan	L 86–87 ^{OT}	6–3	University Arena (2,031); Kalamazoo, Michigan
12/12/2015*; 4:00 pm		Stony Brook	W 75–62	7–3	Matthews Arena (1,263); Boston
12/19/2015*; 12:30 pm, NBCSN		No. 1 Michigan State; Northeastern Winter Showdown	L 58–78	7–4	Matthews Arena (5,288); Boston, Massachusetts
12/22/2015*; 1:00 pm		Vermont	W 77–65	8–4	Matthews Arena (928); Boston
12/29/2015*; 7:00 pm, ESPN3		at NC State	L 66–72	8–5	PNC Arena (17,074); Raleigh, North Carolina
CAA regular season
12/31/2015; 2:00 pm		at Elon	W 86–79	9–5 (1–0)	Alumni Gym (1,087); Elon, North Carolina
01/02/2016; 6:00 pm, ASN		at UNC Wilmington	W 65–63	10–5 (2–0)	Trask Coliseum (3,974); Wilmington, North Carolina
01/07/2016; 7:00 pm		Delaware	W 88–56	11–5 (3–0)	Matthews Arena (1,687); Boston
01/09/2016; 4:00 pm		at William & Mary	L 60–78	11–6 (3–1)	Kaplan Arena (3,626); Williamsburg, Virginia
01/14/2016; 7:00 pm, CSN		James Madison	L 63–75	11–7 (3–2)	Matthews Arena (1,944); Boston
01/16/2016; 2:00 pm		at Delaware	W 69–60	12–7 (4–2)	Bob Carpenter Center (2,763); Newark, Delaware
01/21/2016; 8:00 pm, CSN		Hofstra	L 92–96 ^{3OT}	12–8 (4–3)	Matthews Arena (1,359); Boston
01/23/2016; 1:00 pm		Towson	L 72–79	12–9 (4–4)	Matthews Arena (1,187); Boston
01/28/2016; 7:30 pm		at College of Charleston	L 61–68	12–10 (4–5)	TD Arena (2,528); Charleston, South Carolina
01/30/2016; 7:00 pm		Elon	L 67–71	12–11 (4–6)	Matthews Arena (1,259); Boston
02/04/2016; 7:00 pm, CSN		William & Mary	L 77–86	12–12 (4–7)	Matthews Arena (1,416); Boston
02/06/2016; 7:00 pm		UNC Wilmington	L 73–90	12–13 (4–8)	Matthews Arena (1,677); Boston
02/11/2016; 7:00 pm		at Towson	W 47–44	13–13 (5–8)	SECU Arena (1,578); Towson, Maryland
02/13/2016; 1:00 pm		Drexel	W 70–60	14–13 (6–8)	Matthews Arena (1,238); Boston
02/18/2016; 7:00 pm		at James Madison	W 95–94 ^{3OT}	15–13 (7–8)	JMU Convocation Center (3,152); Harrisonburg, Virginia
02/21/2016; 2:00 pm, NBCSN		at Hofstra	L 60–65	15–14 (7–9)	Mack Sports Complex (3,030); Hempstead, New York
02/25/2016; 7:00 pm		College of Charleston	W 58–57	16–14 (8–9)	Matthews Arena (1,585); Boston
02/27/2016; 4:00 pm		at Drexel	W 61–59	17–14 (9–9)	Daskalakis Athletic Center (1,307); Philadelphia
CAA tournament
03/05/2015; 8:30 pm, CSN	(6)	vs. (3) Towson; Quarterfinals	W 71–60	18–14	Royal Farms Arena (3,450); Baltimore
03/06/2015; 3:30 pm, NBCSN	(6)	vs. (2) UNC Wilmington; Semifinals	L 70–73	18–15	Royal Farms Arena (3,643); Baltimore
*Non-conference game. ^{#}Rankings from AP Poll. (#) Tournament seedings in parentheses. All times are in Eastern Time.
