= 2015–16 Charleston Cougars men's basketball team =

American college basketball season

2015–16 Charleston Cougars men's basketball
- Conference: Colonial Athletic Association
- Record: 17–14 (8–10 CAA)
- Head coach: Earl Grant (2nd season)
- Assistant coaches: Dick Bender; Milan Brown; Quinton Ferrell
- Home arena: TD Arena

2015–16 CAA men's basketball standings
	Conf.				Overall
Team	W		L	PCT	W		L	PCT
Hofstra	14	–	4	.778	24	–	10	.706
UNC Wilmington †	14	–	4	.778	25	–	8	.758
Towson	11	–	7	.611	20	–	13	.606
James Madison	11	–	7	.611	21	–	11	.656
William & Mary	11	–	7	.611	20	–	11	.645
Northeastern	9	–	9	.500	18	–	15	.545
College of Charleston	8	–	10	.444	17	–	14	.548
Elon	7	–	11	.389	16	–	16	.500
Drexel	3	–	15	.167	6	–	25	.194
Delaware	2	–	16	.111	7	–	23	.233
† 2016 CAA tournament winner

The 2015–16 College of Charleston Cougars men's basketball team represented the College of Charleston during the 2015–16 NCAA Division I men's basketball season. The Cougars were led by second-year head coach Earl Grant. The Cougars played their home games at the TD Arena and were in their third year as members of the Colonial Athletic Association. They finished the season 17–14, 8–10 in CAA play to finish in seventh place. They advanced to the quarterfinals of the CAA tournament where they lost to UNC Wilmington.

== Previous season ==
The Cougars finished the 2015–16 season 9–24, 3–15 in CAA play to finish in last place. They advanced to the quarterfinals of the CAA tournament where they lost to UNC Wilmington.

== Departures ==
Name	Number	Pos.	Height	Weight	Year	Hometown	Notes
Adjehi Baru	1	F/C	6'9"	225	Senior	Abidjan, Ivory Coast	Graduated
Glen Pierre Jr.	5	F/C	6'11"	210	Sophomore	Orlando, Florida	Transferred to SIU Edwardsville
Pat Branin	10	G	6'1"	190	Senior	Richmond, Virginia	Graduated
Anthony Stitt	22	G	6'1"	180	Senior	Charlotte, North Carolina	Graduated
David Wishon	33	C	7'2"	265	RS Junior	Concord, North Carolina	Transferred to Lipscomb

=== Incoming transfers ===
Name	Number	Pos.	Height	Weight	Year	Hometown	Previous School
Payton Hulsey	3	G	6'5"	200	Junior	Memphis, Tennessee	Eastern Florida State College
James Bourne	44	F	6'8"	240	RS Senior	Alexandria, Virginia	Winthrop

== Recruiting ==
College recruiting
Name	Hometown	School	Height	Weight	Commit date
Marquise Pointer; PG	Jonesboro, Arkansas	Jonesboro Senior High School	6 ft 0 in (1.83 m)	185 lb (84 kg)	Oct 1, 2014
Marquise Pointer; PG	Recruit ratings: Scout: Rivals: (77)				
Grant Riller; SG	Ocoee, Florida	Ocoee High School	6 ft 3 in (1.91 m)	165 lb (75 kg)	Oct 4, 2014
Grant Riller; SG	Recruit ratings: Scout: Rivals: (NR)				
Jarrell Brantley; SF	Columbia, South Carolina	Notre Dame Prep	6 ft 6 in (1.98 m)	N/A	
Jarrell Brantley; SF	Recruit ratings: Scout: Rivals: (NR)				
Overall recruit ranking:
Note: In many cases, Scout, Rivals, 247Sports, On3, and ESPN may conflict in their listings of height and weight.; In these cases, the average was taken. ESPN grades are on a 100-point scale.; Sources: "2015 Team Ranking". Rivals.

=== Recruiting class of 2016 ===
College recruiting (2016)
Name	Hometown	School	Height	Weight	Commit date
Brevin Galloway; PG	Anderson, South Carolina	Seneca High School	6 ft 0 in (1.83 m)	170 lb (77 kg)	May 6, 2015
Brevin Galloway; PG	Recruit ratings: Scout: Rivals: (NR)				
Overall recruit ranking:
Note: In many cases, Scout, Rivals, 247Sports, On3, and ESPN may conflict in their listings of height and weight.; In these cases, the average was taken. ESPN grades are on a 100-point scale.; Sources: "2016 Team Ranking". Rivals.

== Roster ==
2015–16 College of Charleston Cougars men's basketball team
Players
Coaches

Pos.	#	Name	Height	Weight	Year	Previous school	Hometown
F	0	Donovan Gilmore	6 ft 7 in (2.01 m)	205 lb (93 kg)	So	Wesleyan Christian Academy	Greensboro, North Carolina
G	1	Grant Riller	6 ft 3 in (1.91 m)	178 lb (81 kg)	Fr	Ocoee	Ocoee, Florida
G	3	Payton Hulsey	6 ft 5 in (1.96 m)	215 lb (98 kg)	Jr	Southwind/Eastern Florida	Memphis, Tennessee
G	4	John Eck (W)	6 ft 4 in (1.93 m)	170 lb (77 kg)	So	Hilton Head Prep	Hilton Head Island, South Carolina
F	5	Jarrell Brantley	6 ft 7 in (2.01 m)	245 lb (111 kg)	Fr	Notre Dame Prep	Columbia, South Carolina
F	11	Evan Bailey	6 ft 6 in (1.98 m)	207 lb (94 kg)	So	Jackson	Canton, Ohio
G	12	Cameron Johnson	6 ft 4 in (1.93 m)	196 lb (89 kg)	So	Clarke Central	Athens, Georgia
G	13	Joe Chealey	6 ft 3 in (1.91 m)	180 lb (82 kg)	Jr	Apopka	Orlando, Florida
F	15	Terrance O'Donohue	6 ft 7 in (2.01 m)	227 lb (103 kg)	Jr	Norcross	Norcorss, Georgia
G	21	Marquise Pointer	6 ft 0 in (1.83 m)	205 lb (93 kg)	Fr	Jonesboro	Jonesboro, Arkansas
F	23	Nick Harris	6 ft 10 in (2.08 m)	245 lb (111 kg)	RS Fr	St. Pius X Catholic	Dacula, Georgia
G	24	Canyon Barry	6 ft 6 in (1.98 m)	210 lb (95 kg)	RS Jr	Cheyenne Mountain	Colorado Springs, Colorado
G	25	Tim Branin II (W)	6 ft 1 in (1.85 m)	180 lb (82 kg)	Fr	Deep Run	Richmond, Virginia
F	31	Harrison Bowne (W)	6 ft 6 in (1.98 m)	230 lb (104 kg)	Sr	St. Stephens	Hickory, North Carolina
F	44	James Bourne	6 ft 8 in (2.03 m)	255 lb (116 kg)	RS Sr	Bishop O'Connell/Winthrop	Alexandria, Virginia

Head coach

- Earl Grant (Georgia College)

Assistant coach(es)

- Dick Bender (McDaniel)
- Milan Brown (Howard)
- Quinton Ferrell (Presbyterian)

Legend

- (C) Team captain
- (S) Suspended
- (I) Ineligible
- (W) Walk-on
- Injured
- Current redshirt

Roster

== Schedule ==
Date time, TV	Rank^{#}	Opponent^{#}	Result	Record	Site (attendance) city, state
Exhibition
November 5, 2015*; 7:00 pm		Southern Wesleyan	W 85–54	1–0	TD Arena; Charleston, South Carolina
Non-Conference regular season
November 13, 2015*; 7:00 pm		South Carolina State	W 74–54	1–0	TD Arena (4,024); Charleston, South Carolina
November 16, 2015*; 7:00 pm		at Navy	W 72–58	2–0	Alumni Hall (672); Annapolis, Maryland
November 21, 2015*; 1:00 pm		at Davidson	L 81–82	2–1	John M. Belk Arena (4,478); Davidson, North Carolina
November 24, 2015*; 7:00 pm		Coastal Carolina	L 61–67	2–2	TD Arena (2,367); Charleston, South Carolina
November 27, 2015*; 3:00 pm		Western Carolina	W 57-56	3–2	TD Arena (2,002); Charleston, South Carolina
November 30, 2015*; 7:00 pm		LSU	W 70–58	4–2	TD Arena (4,761); Charleston, South Carolina
December 5, 2015*; 1:00 pm, ESPN3		at The Citadel	W 82–74	5–2	McAlister Field House (2,156); Charleston, South Carolina
December 7, 2015*; 7:00 pm		East Carolina	W 77–73	6–2	TD Arena (2,357); Charleston, South Carolina
December 13, 2015*; 3:00 pm		North Greenville	W 89–52	7–2	TD Arena (2,304); Charleston, South Carolina
December 19, 2015*; 4:00 pm, RSN		at No. 15 Miami (FL)	L 63–85	7–3	BankUnited Center (6,956); Coral Gables, Florida
December 22, 2015*; 2:00 pm		at Campbell	W 86–68	8–3	Gore Arena (1,124); Buies Creek, North Carolina
CAA regular season
December 31, 2015; 1:00 pm		at James Madison	W	9–3 (1–0)	JMU Convocation Center (2,495); Harrisonburg, Virginia
January 2, 2016; 4:00 pm		at William & Mary	L 70–78	9–4 (0–1)	Kaplan Arena (2,873); Williamsburg, Virginia
January 7, 2016; 7:00 pm		Hofstra	W 72–61	10–4 (2–1)	TD Arena (3,407); Charleston, South Carolina
January 9, 2016; 4:00 pm		at Drexel	L 54–61	10–5 (2–2)	Daskalakis Athletic Center (1,240); Philadelphia
January 14, 2016; 7:30 pm		William & Mary	L 61–63	10–6 (2–3)	TD Arena (3,069); Charleston, South Carolina
January 16, 2016; 4:00 pm, WCIV		Elon	L 64–65	10–7 (2–4)	TD Arena (2,874); Charleston, South Carolina
January 21, 2016; 6:00 pm, CSN		at Towson	W 40–37	11–7 (3–4)	SECU Arena (1,466); Towson, Maryland
January 23, 2016; 4:00 pm		Delaware	W 59–58	12–7 (4–4)	TD Arena (2,913); Charleston, South Carolina
January 28, 2016; 7:30 pm, WCIV		Northeastern	W 68–61	13–7 (5–4)	TD Arena (2,528); Charleston, South Carolina
January 30, 2016; 7:00 pm		at UNC Wilmington	L 55–65	13–8 (5–5)	Trask Coliseum (5,100); Wilmington, North Carolina
February 4, 2016; 7:30 pm, WCIV		Towson	W 65–47	14–8 (6–5)	TD Arena (2,538); Charleston, South Carolina
February 6, 2016; 4:00 pm, WCIV		Drexel	W 60–38	15–8 (7–5)	TD Arena (3,456); Charleston, South Carolina
February 11, 2016; 7:30 pm, WCIV		James Madison	L 52–56	15–9 (7–6)	TD Arena (3,023); Charleston, South Carolina
February 13, 2016; 7:00 pm		at Elon	W 66–62	16–9 (8–6)	Alumni Gym (1,688); Elon, North Carolina
February 18, 2016; 7:00 pm		at Delaware	L 59–62	16–10 (8–7)	Bob Carpenter Center (1,831); Newark, Delaware
February 20, 2016; 6:00 pm, ASN		UNC Wilmington	L 55–59 ^{OT}	16–11 (8–8)	TD Arena (3,629); Charleston, South Carolina
February 25, 2016; 7:00 pm		at Northeastern	L 57–58	16–12 (8–9)	Matthews Arena (1,585); Boston
February 27, 2016; 4:00 pm, ASN		at Hofstra	L 63–72	16–13 (8–10)	Mack Sports Complex (3,478); Hempstead, New York
CAA tournament
March 4, 2016; 8:30 pm, CAA.tv	(7)	vs. (10) Delaware first round	W 67–63	17–13	Royal Farms Arena (2,170); Baltimore
March 5, 2016; 6:00 pm, CSN	(7)	vs. (2) UNC Wilmington quarterfinals	L 64–66	17–14	Royal Farms Arena (3,450); Baltimore
*Non-conference game. ^{#}Rankings from AP poll. (#) Tournament seedings in parentheses. All times are in Eastern Time.
