= 2015–16 Elon Phoenix men's basketball team =

American college basketball season

2015–16 Elon Phoenix men's basketball
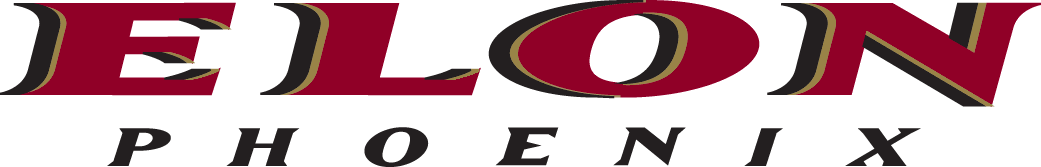
- Conference: Colonial Athletic Association
- Record: 16–16 (7–11 CAA)
- Head coach: Matt Matheny (7th season)
- Assistant coaches: Jack Wooten; Monty Sanders; Chris Long
- Home arena: Alumni Gym

2015–16 CAA men's basketball standings
| | Conf. | | | | Overall |
| Team | W | | L | PCT | W | | L | PCT |
|---|---|---|---|---|---|---|---|---|
| Hofstra | 14 | – | 4 | .778 | 24 | – | 10 | .706 |
| UNC Wilmington † | 14 | – | 4 | .778 | 25 | – | 8 | .758 |
| Towson | 11 | – | 7 | .611 | 20 | – | 13 | .606 |
| James Madison | 11 | – | 7 | .611 | 21 | – | 11 | .656 |
| William & Mary | 11 | – | 7 | .611 | 20 | – | 11 | .645 |
| Northeastern | 9 | – | 9 | .500 | 18 | – | 15 | .545 |
| College of Charleston | 8 | – | 10 | .444 | 17 | – | 14 | .548 |
| Elon | 7 | – | 11 | .389 | 16 | – | 16 | .500 |
| Drexel | 3 | – | 15 | .167 | 6 | – | 25 | .194 |
| Delaware | 2 | – | 16 | .111 | 7 | – | 23 | .233 |
† 2016 CAA tournament winner

The 2015–16 Elon Phoenix men's basketball team represented Elon University during the 2015–16 NCAA Division I men's basketball season. The Phoenix, led by seventh year head coach Matt Matheny, played their home games at Alumni Gym and were second year members of the Colonial Athletic Association. They finished the season 16–16, 7–11 in CAA play to finish in eighth place. They lost in the first round of the CAA tournament to Drexel.

== Previous season ==
The Phoenix finished the season 15–18, 6–12 in CAA play to finish in eighth place. They lost in the quarterfinals of the CAA tournament to William & Mary.

== Departures ==
| Name | Number | Pos. | Height | Weight | Year | Hometown | Notes |
|---|---|---|---|---|---|---|---|
| Austin Hamilton | 10 | G | 5'10" | 190 | Senior | Herndon, Virginia | Graduated |
| Kevin Blake | 11 | G | 6'3" | 195 | Senior | Toronto | Graduated |
| Ryan Winters | 32 | F | 6'7" | 218 | Senior | Denver | Graduated |
| Elijah Bryant | 33 | G | 6'4" | 205 | Freshman | Gwinnett, Georgia | Transferred to BYU |

== Recruiting ==
College recruiting information
| Name | Hometown | School | Height | Weight | Commit date |
|---|---|---|---|---|---|
| Steven Santa Ana; SG | Charlotte, North Carolina | Ardrey Kell High School | 6 ft 4 in (1.93 m) | 185 lb (84 kg) | Apr 1, 2014 |
| Steven Santa Ana; SG | Recruit ratings: Scout: ESPN: (70) | | | | |
| Tyler Sebring; PF | Normal, Illinois | Normal Community High School | 6 ft 8 in (2.03 m) | N/A | Jul 29, 2014 |
| Tyler Sebring; PF | Recruit ratings: No ratings found | | | | |
| Karolis Kundrotas; PF | Kaunas, Lithuania | Barking Abbey School | 6 ft 10 in (2.08 m) | 240 lb (110 kg) | Jun 5, 2015 |
| Karolis Kundrotas; PF | Recruit ratings: No ratings found | | | | |
Overall recruit ranking:
Note: In many cases, Scout, Rivals, 247Sports, On3, and ESPN may conflict in their listings of height and weight.; In these cases, the average was taken. ESPN grades are on a 100-point scale.; Sources: "Elon". ESPN.; "2015 Team Ranking". Rivals.

== Roster ==
2015–16 Elon Phoenix men's basketball team
Players
Coaches

| Pos. | # | Name | Height | Weight | Year | Previous school | Hometown |
|---|---|---|---|---|---|---|---|
| F | 00 | Brian Dawkins | 6 ft 8 in (2.03 m) | 240 lb (109 kg) | RS So | Bishop Kenny | Jacksonville, Florida |
| G | 1 | Luke Eddy | 6 ft 0 in (1.83 m) | 190 lb (86 kg) | Jr | George Washington | Charleston, West Virginia |
| G | 2 | Dmitri Thompson | 6 ft 4 in (1.93 m) | 195 lb (88 kg) | So | Orlando Christian Prep | Orlando, Florida |
| G | 3 | Tanner Samson | 6 ft 4 in (1.93 m) | 195 lb (88 kg) | Sr | Regis Jesuit | Littleton, Colorado |
| F | 4 | Collin Luther | 6 ft 6 in (1.98 m) | 210 lb (95 kg) | So | Hampton | Pittsburgh |
| G | 5 | Sam Hershberger (W) | 6 ft 0 in (1.83 m) | 180 lb (82 kg) | Sr | Butler | Vandalia, Ohio |
| F | 10 | Karolis Kundrotas | 6 ft 10 in (2.08 m) | 240 lb (109 kg) | Fr | Barking Abbey School | Kaunas, Lithuania |
| G/F | 12 | Christian Hairston | 6 ft 7 in (2.01 m) | 205 lb (93 kg) | Jr | Greensboro Day School | Greensboro, North Carolina |
| G | 13 | Dainan Swoope (W) | 6 ft 0 in (1.83 m) | 180 lb (82 kg) | Fr | Sunrise Christian Academy | Kansas City, Kansas |
| F | 14 | Jack Anton | 6 ft 8 in (2.03 m) | 230 lb (104 kg) | So | Archbishop Moeller | Mason, Ohio |
| C | 15 | Tony Sabato | 6 ft 7 in (2.01 m) | 220 lb (100 kg) | Sr | Archbishop Moeller | Cincinnati |
| G | 20 | Sheldon Eberhardt | 6 ft 4 in (1.93 m) | 185 lb (84 kg) | Fr | Middle Creek | Apex, North Carolina |
| F | 21 | Jack George | 6 ft 10 in (2.08 m) | 210 lb (95 kg) | RS Fr | Carmel Catholic | Libertyville, Illinois |
| G | 22 | Steven Santa Ana | 6 ft 4 in (1.93 m) | 185 lb (84 kg) | Fr | Ardrey Kell | Charlotte, North Carolina |
| G | 25 | Ryder Bowline (W) | 6 ft 4 in (1.93 m) | 225 lb (102 kg) | Jr | Forsyth Central | Cumming, Georgia |
| F | 30 | Wes Brewer (W) | 6 ft 7 in (2.01 m) | 230 lb (104 kg) | RS Jr | Walter Williams | Burlington, North Carolina |
| F | 41 | Tyler Seibring | 6 ft 8 in (2.03 m) | 225 lb (102 kg) | Fr | Normal Community | Normal, Illinois |
| G | 42 | Patrick Ryan (W) | 6 ft 6 in (1.98 m) | 190 lb (86 kg) | Jr | Greens Farms Academy | Darien, Connecticut |

Head coach

- Matt Matheny (Davidson)

Assistant coach(es)

- Jack Wooten (North Carolina)
- Monty Sanders (Elon)
- Chris Long (Elon)

Legend

- (C) Team captain
- (S) Suspended
- (I) Ineligible
- (W) Walk-on
- Injured
- Current redshirt

Roster
Last update: October 3, 2014

== Schedule ==
| Date time, TV | Opponent | Result | Record | Site (attendance) city, state |
Exhibition
| Nov 5, 2015*; 7:00 pm | William Peace | W 90–73 | | Alumni Gym; Elon, North Carolina |
Non-conference regular season
| Nov 13, 2015*; 8:00 pm, ASN | at Charlotte | W 86–74 | 1–0 | Dale F. Halton Arena (5,390); Charlotte, North Carolina |
| Nov 16, 2015*; 7:00 pm, ESPN3 | at No. 24 Michigan; Battle 4 Atlantis Mainland | L 68–88 | 1–1 | Crisler Center (9,716); Ann Arbor, Michigan |
| Nov 18, 2015*; 7:00 pm | Belmont Abbey | W 84–57 | 2–1 | Alumni Gym (1,030); Elon, North Carolina |
| Nov 21, 2015*; 7:00 pm, ESPN3 | at Syracuse; Battle 4 Atlantis Mainland | L 55–66 | 2–2 | Carrier Dome (16,529); Syracuse, New York |
| Nov 26, 2015*; 2:00 pm | Mount St. Mary's; Battle 4 Atlantis Mainland | W 79–74 | 3–2 | Alumni Gym (611); Elon, North Carolina |
| Nov 27, 2015*; 7:00 pm | Texas A&M–Corpus Christi; Battle 4 Atlantis Mainland | L 81–85 | 3–3 | Alumni Gym (847); Elon, North Carolina |
| Nov 30, 2015*; 7:00 pm | Kennesaw State | W 103–93 ^{OT} | 4–3 | Alumni Gym (963); Elon, North Carolina |
| Dec 4, 2015*; 7:00 pm | at Florida International | W 77–71 | 5–3 | FIU Arena (949); Miami |
| Dec 13, 2015*; 2:00 pm | Wesley | W 106–77 | 6–3 | Alumni Gym (1,171); Elon, North Carolina |
| Dec 16, 2015*; 7:00 pm | Alabama State | W 91–74 | 7–3 | Alumni Gym (903); Elon, North Carolina |
| Dec 19, 2015*; 1:00 pm | UNC Greensboro | W 79–69 | 8–3 | Alumni Gym (1,000); Elon, North Carolina |
| Dec 21, 2015*; 7:00 pm | at UNC Asheville | W 86–81 | 9–3 | Kimmel Arena (1,611); Asheville, North Carolina |
| Dec 28, 2015*; 8:00 pm, ESPNU | at No. 15 Duke | L 66–105 | 9–4 | Cameron Indoor Stadium (9,314); Durham, North Carolina |
CAA regular season
| Dec 31, 2015; 2:00 pm | Northeastern | L 79–86 | 9–5 (0–1) | Alumni Gym (1,087); Elon, North Carolina |
| Jan 2, 2016; 4:00 pm | Drexel | W 83–78 | 10–5 (1–1) | Alumni Gym (1,134); Elon, North Carolina |
| Jan 7, 2016; 7:00 pm | at James Madison | W 79–73 | 11–5 (2–1) | JMU Convocation Center (2,300); Harrisonburg, Virginia |
| Jan 9, 2016; 6:00 pm, ASN | Hofstra | L 76–80 | 11–6 (2–2) | Alumni Gym (1,419); Elon, North Carolina |
| Jan 14, 2016; 7:00 pm | UNC Wilmington | L 82–91 | 11–7 (2–3) | Alumni Gym (1,357); Elon, North Carolina |
| Jan 16, 2016; 4:00 pm, WCIV | at College of Charleston | W 65–64 | 12–7 (3–3) | TD Arena (2,874); Charleston, South Carolina |
| Jan 21, 2016; 7:00 pm | at William & Mary | L 67–89 | 12–8 (3–4) | Kaplan Arena (3,278); Williamsburg, Virginia |
| Jan 23, 2016; 7:00 pm | James Madison | L 64–82 | 12–9 (3–5) | Alumni Gym (1,248); Elon, North Carolina |
| Jan 28, 2016; 7:00 pm | at Hofstra | L 64–66 | 12–10 (3–6) | Mack Sports Complex (1,125); Hempstead, New York |
| Jan 30, 2016; 7:00 pm | at Northeastern | W 71–66 | 13–10 (4–6) | Matthews Arena (1,259); Boston |
| Feb 4, 2016; 7:00 pm | Delaware | W 83–56 | 14–10 (5–6) | Alumni Gym (1,336); Elon, North Carolina |
| Feb 6, 2016; 6:00 pm, ASN | Towson | L 77–81 | 14–11 (5–7) | Alumni Gym (1,479); Elon, North Carolina |
| Feb 11, 2016; 7:00 pm | at UNC Wilmington | L 82–86 | 14–12 (5–8) | Trask Coliseum (4,136); Wilmington, North Carolina |
| Feb 13, 2016; 7:00 pm | College of Charleston | L 62–66 | 14–13 (5–9) | Alumni Gym (1,688); Elon, North Carolina |
| Feb 18, 2016; 7:00 pm | at Drexel | W 81–76 | 15–13 (6–9) | Daskalakis Athletic Center (976); Philadelphia |
| Feb 20, 2016; Noon, CSN | at Towson | L 56–67 | 15–14 (6–10) | SECU Arena (2,736); Towson, Maryland |
| Feb 25, 2016; 7:00 pm | William & Mary | L 65–75 | 15–15 (6–11) | Alumni Gym (1,632); Elon, North Carolina |
| Feb 27, 2016; 2:00 pm | at Delaware | W 77–59 | 16–15 (7–11) | Bob Carpenter Center (2,457); Newark, Delaware |
CAA tournament
| Mar 4, 2016; 6:00 pm | vs. (9) Drexel; First round | L 56–57 | 16–16 | Royal Farms Arena (2,170); Baltimore |
*Non-conference game. ^{#}Rankings from AP Poll. (#) Tournament seedings in parentheses. All times are in Eastern Time.

== See also ==
2015–16 Elon Phoenix women's basketball team
