= 2015–16 Drexel Dragons men's basketball team =

American college basketball season

2015–16 Drexel Dragons men's basketball
- Conference: Colonial Athletic Association
- Record: 6–25 (3–15 CAA)
- Head coach: Bruiser Flint (15th season)
- Assistant coaches: Mike Connors (8th season); Matt Collier (6th season); Bobby Jordan (4th season)
- MVP: Kazembe Abif
- Home arena: Daskalakis Athletic Center

2015–16 CAA men's basketball standings
	Conf.				Overall
Team	W		L	PCT	W		L	PCT
Hofstra	14	–	4	.778	24	–	10	.706
UNC Wilmington †	14	–	4	.778	25	–	8	.758
Towson	11	–	7	.611	20	–	13	.606
James Madison	11	–	7	.611	21	–	11	.656
William & Mary	11	–	7	.611	20	–	11	.645
Northeastern	9	–	9	.500	18	–	15	.545
College of Charleston	8	–	10	.444	17	–	14	.548
Elon	7	–	11	.389	16	–	16	.500
Drexel	3	–	15	.167	6	–	25	.194
Delaware	2	–	16	.111	7	–	23	.233
† 2016 CAA tournament winner

The 2015–16 Drexel Dragons men's basketball team represented Drexel University during the 2015–16 NCAA Division I men's basketball season. The Dragons, led by 15th year head coach Bruiser Flint, played their home games at the Daskalakis Athletic Center and were members of the Colonial Athletic Association.

They finished the season 6–25, 3–15 in CAA play to finish in ninth place in the regular season. They lost in the quarterfinals of the CAA tournament to Hofstra.

On March 7, 2016, following the end of Drexel's season, Bruiser Flint was fired as head basketball coach after 15 seasons with the team.

== Previous season ==
The 2014–15 Drexel Dragons finished the season with a record of 10-18 after losing to the College of Charleston in the 2015 CAA men's basketball tournament. The team went 9–9 in the CAA regular season, and was the 7 seed in the conference tournament.

== Off season ==
=== Departures ===
Name	Number	Pos.	Height	Weight	Year	Hometown	Notes
Sooren Derboghosian	0	C	6'10"	255	RS Senior	Tehran, Iran	Graduated
Freddie Wilson	1	PG	6'3"	204	Senior	New Haven, CT	Graduated
Damion Lee	14	G/F	6'6"	200	RS Junior	Baltimore, MD	Transferred to Louisville

=== Incoming transfers ===
College recruiting information
Name	Hometown	School	Height	Weight	Commit date
Ahmad Fields; SG	Washington, D.C.	Utah	6 ft 5 in (1.96 m)	190 lb (86 kg)	Apr 22, 2014
Ahmad Fields; SG	Recruit ratings: Scout: Rivals: 247Sports: ESPN: (67)				
Miles Overton; SG	Philadelphia, PA	Wake Forest	6 ft 4 in (1.93 m)	215 lb (98 kg)	Jan 26, 2015
Miles Overton; SG	Recruit ratings: Scout: Rivals: 247Sports: ESPN: (74)				
Chandler Fraser-Pauls; G	Pennington, NJ	Lafayette	6 ft 0 in (1.83 m)	175 lb (79 kg)	
Chandler Fraser-Pauls; G	Recruit ratings: No ratings found				
Overall recruit ranking:
Note: In many cases, Scout, Rivals, 247Sports, On3, and ESPN may conflict in their listings of height and weight.; In these cases, the average was taken. ESPN grades are on a 100-point scale.; Sources: "Drexel 2015 Basketball Commitments". Rivals.; "Drexel Dragons". ESPN.; "2015 Team Ranking". Rivals.

- Miles Overton was not eligible to play in the 2015–16 season due to NCAA transfer rules. Overton redshirted and entered the 2016–17 season as a redshirt sophomore with 3 years of eligibility remaining.

=== 2015 Recruiting Class ===
College recruiting information
Name	Hometown	School	Height	Weight	Commit date
Terrell Allen; PG	Upper Marlboro, MD	DeMatha Catholic High School	6 ft 2 in (1.88 m)	185 lb (84 kg)	Sep 10, 2014
Terrell Allen; PG	Recruit ratings: Rivals: 247Sports: ESPN: (64)				
Andrew Cartwright; F	Guilford, ME	Nokomis Regional High School	6 ft 6 in (1.98 m)	215 lb (98 kg)	
Andrew Cartwright; F	Recruit ratings: No ratings found				
Overall recruit ranking:
Note: In many cases, Scout, Rivals, 247Sports, On3, and ESPN may conflict in their listings of height and weight.; In these cases, the average was taken. ESPN grades are on a 100-point scale.; Sources: "Drexel 2015 Basketball Commitments". Rivals.; "Drexel Dragons". ESPN.; "2015 Team Ranking". Rivals.

== Roster ==
2015–16 Drexel Dragons men's basketball team
Players
Coaches

Pos.	#	Name	Height	Weight	Year	Previous school	Hometown
G	0	Miles Overton (I) (redshirt)	6 ft 4 in (1.93 m)	225 lb (102 kg)	Jr	Saint Joseph's Prep/Wake Forest	Philadelphia, PA
G	1	Ahmad Fields	6 ft 5 in (1.96 m)	195 lb (88 kg)	RS So	Massanutten Academy/Utah	Washington, D.C.
G	2	Sammy Mojica	6 ft 3 in (1.91 m)	190 lb (86 kg)	So	Brimmer and May School	Chestnut Hill, MA
F	5	Austin Williams	6 ft 8 in (2.03 m)	235 lb (107 kg)	So	Trinity Episcopal HS	Richmond, VA
G/F	11	Tavon Allen	6 ft 7 in (2.01 m)	190 lb (86 kg)	RS Sr	Hillhouse HS	New Haven, CT
G	12	Terrell Allen	6 ft 2 in (1.88 m)	180 lb (82 kg)	Fr	DeMatha Catholic HS	Upper Marlboro, MD
G	13	Rashann London	6 ft 2 in (1.88 m)	185 lb (84 kg)	So	Roman Catholic HS	Philadelphia, PA
F/C	15	Mohamed Bah	6 ft 9 in (2.06 m)	225 lb (102 kg)	Jr	Lee Academy (ME)	Bamako, Mali
F	24	Rodney Williams	6 ft 7 in (2.01 m)	225 lb (102 kg)	Jr	St. Christopher's School (VA)	Richmond, VA
G	25	Major Canady (injured)	6 ft 4 in (1.93 m)	210 lb (95 kg)	RS So	The Kiski School (PA)	Wilson, NC
F	32	Kazembe Abif	6 ft 7 in (2.01 m)	220 lb (100 kg)	RS Sr	University HS (NJ)	Elizabeth, NJ
G	33	Chandler Fraser-Pauls (W)	6 ft 0 in (1.83 m)	175 lb (79 kg)	RS Sr	The Pennington School/Lafayette	Pennington, NJ
F	35	Andrew Cartwright (W)	6 ft 6 in (1.98 m)	215 lb (98 kg)	Fr	Nokomis Regional HS	Guilford, ME
F	55	Tyshawn Myles	6 ft 8 in (2.03 m)	260 lb (118 kg)	So	Washington Heights	Queens, NY

Head coach

- Bruiser Flint (Saint Joseph's)

Assistant coach(es)

- Mike Connors (Ithaca)
- Matt Collier (UMass)
- Bobby Jordan (Drexel)

Legend

- (C) Team captain
- (S) Suspended
- (I) Ineligible
- (W) Walk-on
- Injured
- Current redshirt

Roster

- On 18 November 2015, the team announced that Redshirt Sophomore guard Major Canady would miss his second consecutive full season due to a knee injury. Canady redshirted the season for the second consecutive year, and retained 3 years of eligibility entering the 2016–17 season.

== Schedule ==
Date time, TV	Rank^{#}	Opponent^{#}	Result	Record	High points	High rebounds	High assists	Site (attendance) city, state
Non-conference regular season
November 13, 2015*; 8:00 pm, PHL17		at Saint Joseph's	L 81–82	0–1	20 – Ta. Allen	7 – Abif	4 – Te. Allen	Hagan Arena (4,200); Philadelphia, PA
November 18, 2015*; 7:00 pm		High Point	L 66–75	0–2	21 – Ta. Allen	8 – Abif	4 – Te. Allen	Daskalakis Athletic Center (1,413); Philadelphia, PA
November 21, 2015*; 2:00 pm		Monmouth	L 74–82	0–3	20 – London	13 – Abif	5 – Tied	Daskalakis Athletic Center (1,522); Philadelphia, PA
November 26, 2015*; 11:59 pm, CBSSN		vs. UNC Asheville; Great Alaska Shootout Quarterfinals	L 66–85	0–4	19 – Te. Allen	8 – Abif	6 – Te. Allen	Alaska Airlines Center (2,542); Anchorage, AK
November 27, 2015*; 6:00 pm		vs. Alaska Anchorage; Great Alaska Shootout Consolation	L 65–71	0–5	20 – Mojica	10 – R. Williams	6 – Mojica	Alaska Airlines Center (2,478); Anchorage, AK
November 28, 2015*; 4:00 pm		vs. San Diego; Great Alaska Shootout 7th place game	L 59–62	0–6	15 – Mojica	11 – Abif	4 – Tied	Alaska Airlines Center (2,193); Anchorage, AK
December 5, 2015*; 2:00 pm		at La Salle	W 66–53	1–6	25 – Ta. Allen	13 – R. Williams	3 – Tied	Tom Gola Arena (2,004); Philadelphia, PA
December 15, 2015*; 7:00 pm, SECN		at South Carolina	L 54–79	1–7	18 – Ta. Allen	4 – A. Williams	4 – Ta. Allen	Colonial Life Arena (8,418); Columbia, SC
December 19, 2015*; 7:00 pm		Penn State	L 57–63	1–8	18 – Te. Allen	5 – Tied	2 – Tied	Palestra (3,033); Philadelphia, PA
December 22, 2015*; 7:00 pm		Penn; Battle of 33rd Street	W 53–52 ^{OT}	2–8	16 – Ta. Allen	14 – Abif	3 – Tied	Daskalakis Athletic Center (1,334); Philadelphia, PA
December 28, 2015*; 7:00 pm		at Iona	L 70–77	2–9	20 – Mojica	8 – R. Williams	3 – Ta. Allen	Hynes Athletic Center (2,177); New Rochelle, NY
CAA regular season
December 31, 2015; 1:00 pm		at UNC Wilmington	L 63–75	2–10 (0–1)	15 – R. Williams	15 – R. Williams	5 – London	Trask Coliseum (3,599); Wilmington, NC
January 2, 2016; 4:00 pm, ASN		at Elon	L 78–82	2–11 (0–2)	19 – Tied	7 – Tied	2 – Tied	Alumni Gym (1,134); Elon, NC
January 7, 2016; 7:00 pm		William & Mary	L 63–72	2–12 (0–3)	13 – Tied	7 – R. Williams	4 – Te. Allen	Daskalakis Athletic Center (1,107); Philadelphia, PA
January 9, 2016; 4:00 pm		College of Charleston	W 61–54	3–12 (1–3)	19 – R. Williams	6 – Te. Allen	5 – Mojica	Daskalakis Athletic Center (1,240); Philadelphia, PA
January 14, 2016; 7:00 pm		at Hofstra	L 61–69	3–13 (1–4)	16 – Abif	10 – Abif	5 – Te. Allen	Mack Sports Complex (1,102); Hempstead, NY
January 16, 2016; 4:00 pm, CSN		at Towson	L 50–69	3–14 (1–5)	15 – Te. Allen	6 – Bah	4 – London	SECU Arena (2,000); Towson, MD
January 21, 2016; 7:00 pm		at James Madison	L 45–86	3–15 (1–6)	15 – Abif	5 – R. Williams	3 – Tied	JMU Convocation Center (2,807); Harrisonburg, VA
January 23, 2016; 6:00 pm, ASN		UNC Wilmington	Postponed to January 24 (Snow)					Daskalakis Athletic Center; Philadelphia, PA
January 24, 2016; 1:00 pm, ASN		UNC Wilmington	L 71–77	3–16 (1–7)	17 – R. Williams	6 – Ta. Allen	5 – Te. Allen	Daskalakis Athletic Center (332); Philadelphia, PA
January 28, 2016; 7:00 pm		Towson	L 70–77	3–17 (1–8)	17 – Mojica	7 – Abif	7 – Te. Allen	Daskalakis Athletic Center (962); Philadelphia, PA
January 30, 2016; 4:00 pm, ASN		Hofstra	L 64–70	3–18 (1–9)	33 – Ta. Allen	10 – Mojica	4 – Mojica	Daskalakis Athletic Center (1,510); Philadelphia, PA
February 4, 2016; 7:00 pm		James Madison	L 56–78	3–19 (1–10)	12 – Mojica	10 – Abif	5 – Ta. Allen	Daskalakis Athletic Center (1,107); Philadelphia, PA
February 6, 2016; 4:00 pm		at College of Charleston	L 38–60	3–20 (1–11)	8 – R. Williams	6 – Mojica	1 – Tied	TD Arena (3,456); Charleston, SC
February 11, 2016; 7:00 pm		at Delaware	L 60–69	3–21 (1–12)	16 – Mojica	7 – Abif	5 – Te. Allen	Bob Carpenter Center (1,946); Newark, DE
February 13, 2016; 1:00 pm		at Northeastern	L 60–70	3–22 (1–13)	23 – R. Williams	5 – Te. Allen	5 – Te. Allen	Matthews Arena (1,238); Boston, MA
February 18, 2016; 7:00 pm		Elon	L 76–81	3–23 (1–14)	18 – Te. Allen	9 – Abif	7 – Te. Allen	Daskalakis Athletic Center (976); Philadelphia, PA
February 20, 2016; 2:00 pm, CSN		at William & Mary	W 74–69	4–23 (2–14)	20 – Te. Allen	12 – Abif	4 – Tied	Kaplan Arena (3,948); Williamsburg, VA
February 25, 2016; 6:00 pm, CSN		Delaware	W 74–64	5–23 (3–14)	19 – Te. Allen	13 – Abif	4 – Tied	Daskalakis Athletic Center (1,107); Philadelphia, PA
February 27, 2016; 4:00 pm		Northeastern	L 59–61	5–24 (3–15)	27 – Ta. Allen	7 – Tied	4 – Ta. Allen	Daskalakis Athletic Center (1,307); Philadelphia, PA
CAA Tournament
March 4, 2016; 6:00 pm	(9)	vs. (8) Elon; First Round	W 57–56	6–24	17 – Ta. Allen	10 – R. Williams	2 – Tied	Royal Farms Arena (2,170); Baltimore, MD
March 5, 2016; 12:00 pm, CSN	(9)	vs. (1) Hofstra; Quarterfinals	L 67–80	6–25	20 – R. Williams	11 – R. Williams	8 – Te. Allen	Royal Farms Arena (3,904); Baltimore, MD
*Non-conference game. ^{#}Rankings from AP. (#) Tournament seedings in parentheses. All times are in Eastern Time.

== Team statistics ==
As of the end of the season.
Indicates team leader in each category.

(FG%, FT% leader = minimum 50 att.; 3P% leader = minimum 20 att.)

Player	GP	GS	MPG	PPG	RPG	APG	SPG	BPG	TPG	FG%	FT%	3P%
Kazembe Abif	31	30	29.9	9.3	7.0	0.8	0.4	0.3	1.3	.466	.621	.111
Tavon Allen	31	19	29.8	13.1	2.8	2.1	0.7	0.5	1.7	.364	.827	.366
Terrell Allen	31	29	32.9	9.8	3.0	3.5	1.5	0.1	1.8	.407	.838	.321
Mohamed Bah	26	2	13.1	2.3	2.9	0.3	0.3	0.4	0.7	.431	.469	.000
Andrew Cartwright	6	0	2.0	0.8	0.3	0.2	0.0	0.0	0.2	.200	1.000	.200
Ahmad Fields	3	1	15.7	6.0	5.3	0.3	0.0	0.0	1.3	.286	.667	.400
Chandler Fraser-Pauls	5	1	1.4	0.0	0.0	0.2	0.0	0.0	0.0	.000	.000	.000
Rashann London	31	24	30.1	7.5	2.3	2.3	0.4	0.0	1.5	.344	.700	.279
Sammy Mojica	31	20	28.4	8.9	3.5	2.0	0.8	0.6	1.6	.351	.623	.338
Tyshawn Myles	23	0	9.3	1.6	2.5	0.1	0.2	0.4	0.4	.438	.333	.000
Austin Williams	17	0	7.8	1.0	2.3	0.1	0.0	0.4	0.4	.353	.500	.000
Rodney Williams	30	29	26.2	10.5	5.6	1.2	0.4	1.1	1.5	.457	.675	.000
Team	31	-	-	63.2	33.0	12.4	4.5	3.5	11.1	.393	.685	.329

== Awards ==
Terrell Allen

- CAA All-Rookie Team
- CAA Rookie of the Week (2)

Kazembe Abif

- Team Most Valuable Player
- "Sweep" Award (team leader in blocks)

Rodney Williams

- CAA All-Academic Team
- Team Academic Award

Tavon Allen

- Dragon "D" Award (team's top defensive player)
- Preseason CAA All-Conference Team Honorable Mention

Terrell Allen

- Assist Award (team leader in assists)

Sammy Mojica

- Samuel D. Cozen Award (team's most improved player)

Chandler Fraser-Pauls

- Donald Shank Spirit & Dedication Award

== See also ==
- 2015–16 Drexel Dragons women's basketball team
