= 2015–16 Delaware Fightin' Blue Hens men's basketball team =

American college basketball season

2015–16 Delaware Fightin' Blue Hens men's basketball
- Conference: Colonial Athletic Association
- Record: 7–23 (2–16 CAA)
- Head coach: Monté Ross (10th season)
- Assistant coaches: Jeff Rafferty; Chris Cheeks; Phil Martelli, Jr.
- Home arena: Bob Carpenter Center

2015–16 CAA men's basketball standings
	Conf.				Overall
Team	W		L	PCT	W		L	PCT
Hofstra	14	–	4	.778	24	–	10	.706
UNC Wilmington †	14	–	4	.778	25	–	8	.758
Towson	11	–	7	.611	20	–	13	.606
James Madison	11	–	7	.611	21	–	11	.656
William & Mary	11	–	7	.611	20	–	11	.645
Northeastern	9	–	9	.500	18	–	15	.545
College of Charleston	8	–	10	.444	17	–	14	.548
Elon	7	–	11	.389	16	–	16	.500
Drexel	3	–	15	.167	6	–	25	.194
Delaware	2	–	16	.111	7	–	23	.233
† 2016 CAA tournament winner

The 2015–16 Delaware Fightin' Blue Hens men's basketball team represented the University of Delaware during the 2015–16 NCAA Division I men's basketball season. The Fightin' Blue Hens, led by ninth year head coach Monté Ross, played their home games at the Bob Carpenter Center and were members of the Colonial Athletic Association. They finished the season 7–23, 2–16 in CAA play to finish in last place. They lost in the first round of the CAA tournament to the College of Charleston.

On March 18, head coach Monté Ross was fired. He finished at Delaware with a ten-year record of 132–184.

== Previous season ==
The Fightin' Blue Hens finished the season 10–20, 9–9 in CAA play to finish in a tie for sixth place. They lost in the quarterfinals of the CAA tournament to Northeastern.

== Departures ==
Name	Number	Pos.	Height	Weight	Year	Hometown	Notes
Kyle Anderson	13	G	6'3"	200	Senior	Newark, Illinois	Graduated
Tom Allshouse	54	F	6'6"	235	Senior	Middletown, Delaware	Graduated

== Recruiting ==
Delaware did not have any incoming players in the 2015 recruiting class.

== Roster ==
2015–16 Delaware Fightin' Blue Hens men's basketball team
Players
Coaches

Pos.	#	Name	Height	Weight	Year	Hometown
G	1	Kory Holden (C)	6 ft 2 in (1.88 m)	180 lb (82 kg)	So	Salisbury, Maryland
F	2	Barnett Harris (W)	6 ft 9 in (2.06 m)	215 lb (98 kg)	Jr	Monroeville, Pennsylvania
G	3	Anthony Mosley	6 ft 1 in (1.85 m)	180 lb (82 kg)	So	Wilmington, Delaware
G	4	Darian Bryant (I)	6 ft 4 in (1.93 m)	220 lb (100 kg)	So	Bowie, Maryland
F	5	Eric Carter (injured)	6 ft 9 in (2.06 m)	230 lb (104 kg)	Fr	Jackson, New Jersey
G	10	Curtis McRoy	6 ft 2 in (1.88 m)	170 lb (77 kg)	So	Annapolis, Maryland
F	11	Devonne Pinkard	6 ft 6 in (1.98 m)	200 lb (91 kg)	So	Lancaster, Pennsylvania
G	12	Chivarsky Corbett (injured)	6 ft 7 in (2.01 m)	195 lb (88 kg)	So	Tampa, Florida
G	14	Tyler Burns (I, W)	5 ft 10 in (1.78 m)	155 lb (70 kg)	So	Wilmington, Delaware
F	15	Maurice Jeffers	6 ft 9 in (2.06 m)	240 lb (109 kg)	RS Jr	Washington, D.C.
F	21	Marvin King-Davis (C)	6 ft 7 in (2.01 m)	230 lb (104 kg)	RS Sr	Richmond, Virginia
G	22	Cazmon Hayes	6 ft 4 in (1.93 m)	195 lb (88 kg)	Jr	Charlotte, North Carolina
F	23	Skye Johnson	6 ft 8 in (2.03 m)	240 lb (109 kg)	So	Lynchburg, Virginia
G	24	Sean Locke (C)	6 ft 4 in (1.93 m)	195 lb (88 kg)	Sr	Newark, Delaware
G	25	Curtis Lochner (W)	5 ft 10 in (1.78 m)	175 lb (79 kg)	Fr	Willow Grove, Pennsylvania

Head coach

- Monté Ross (Winston Salem State)

Assistant coach(es)

- Jeff Rafferty (Springfield)
- Chris Cheeks (Virginia Commonwealth)
- Phil Martelli, Jr. (Saint Joseph's)

Legend

- (C) Team captain
- (S) Suspended
- (I) Ineligible
- (W) Walk-on
- Injured
- Current redshirt

Roster

== Schedule ==
Date time, TV	Opponent	Result	Record	Site (attendance) city, state
Non-conference regular season
November 13, 2015*; 8:00 pm	at Delaware State	W 62–56	1–0	Memorial Hall (1,584); Dover, Delaware
November 20, 2015*; 7:00 pm	at Iona	L 77–92	1–1	Hynes Athletic Center (2,200); New Rochelle, New York
November 24, 2015*; 7:00 pm	Fairleigh Dickinson	W 73–72	2–1	Bob Carpenter Center (1,584); Newark, Delaware
November 29, 2015*; 5:00 pm, ESPN3	at Temple	L 50–69	2–2	Liacouras Center (4,706); Philadelphia
December 1, 2015*; 7:00 pm	Bradley	W 70–47	3–2	Bob Carpenter Center (1,361); Newark, Delaware
December 3, 2015*; 7:00 pm	South Florida	W 67–58	4–2	Bob Carpenter Center (1,817); Newark, Delaware
December 6, 2015*; 2:00 pm	at Columbia	L 69–82	4–3	Levien Gymnasium (989); New York City
December 12, 2015*; 7:00 pm	at Marist	W 70–69	5–3	McCann Field House (1,477); Poughkeepsie, New York
December 19, 2015*; 7:00 pm, ESPN3	at Boston College	L 61–69	5–4	Conte Forum (1,670); Chestnut Hill, Massachusetts
December 22, 2015*; 7:00 pm, FS1	at No. 17 Villanova	L 48–78	5–5	The Pavilion (6,500); Villanova, Pennsylvania
December 29, 2015*; 7:00 pm	at Buffalo	L 79–99	5–6	Alumni Arena (3,212); Amherst, New York
CAA regular season
December 31, 2015; 1:00 pm	at Hofstra	L 80–90	5–7 (0–1)	Mack Sports Complex (1,293); Hempstead, New York
January 2, 2016; 12:00 pm, CSN	James Madison	L 63–73	5–8 (0–2)	Bob Carpenter Center (2,886); Newark, Delaware
January 7, 2016; 7:00 pm	at Northeastern	L 56–88	5–9 (0–3)	Matthews Arena (1,687); Boston
January 9, 2016; 7:00 pm	UNC Wilmington	L 67–85	5–10 (0–4)	Bob Carpenter Center (2,381); Newark, Delaware
January 14, 2016; 7:00 pm	Towson	L 77–79	5–11 (0–5)	Bob Carpenter Center (1,727); Newark, Delaware
January 16, 2016; 2:00 pm	Northeastern	L 60–69	5–12 (0–6)	Bob Carpenter Center (2,763); Newark, Delaware
January 21, 2016; 7:00 pm	at UNC Wilmington	L 70–79	5–13 (0–7)	Trask Coliseum (4,037); Wilmington, North Carolina
January 23, 2016; 4:00 pm	at College of Charleston	L 58–59	5–14 (0–8)	TD Arena (2,913); Charleston, South Carolina
January 28, 2016; 7:00 pm	William & Mary	L 79–94	5–15 (0–9)	Bob Carpenter Center (2,311); Newark, Delaware
January 30, 2016; 2:00 pm, CSN	at Towson	L 97–101 ^{OT}	5–16 (0–10)	SECU Arena (3,115); Towson, Maryland
February 4, 2016; 7:00 pm	at Elon	L 56–83	5–17 (0–11)	Alumni Gym (1,336); Elon, North Carolina
February 6, 2016; 2:30 pm, NBCSN	at William & Mary	L 64–90	5–18 (0–12)	Kaplan Arena (6,028); Williamsburg, Virginia
February 11, 2016; 7:00 pm	Drexel	W 69–60	6–18 (1–12)	Bob Carpenter Center (1,946); Newark, Delaware
February 13, 2016; 5:00 pm, NBCSN	Hofstra	L 66–77	6–19 (1–13)	Bob Carpenter Center (2,622); Newark, Delaware
February 18, 2016; 7:00 pm	College of Charleston	W 62–59	7–19 (2–13)	Bob Carpenter Center (1,831); Newark, Delaware
February 20, 2016; 4:00 pm, CSN	at James Madison	L 50–75	7–20 (2–14)	JMU Convocation Center (5,522); Harrisonburg, Virginia
February 25, 2016; 6:00 pm, CSN	at Drexel	L 64–74	7–21 (2–15)	Daskalakis Athletic Center; Philadelphia
February 27, 2016; 2:00 pm	Elon	L 59–77	7–22 (2–16)	Bob Carpenter Center (2,457); Newark, Delaware
CAA tournament
March 4, 2016; 8:30 pm	vs. College of Charleston; First round	L 64–67	7–23	Royal Farms Arena (2,170); Baltimore
*Non-conference game. ^{#}Rankings from AP Poll. (#) Tournament seedings in parentheses. All times are in Eastern Time.

== See also ==
2015–16 Delaware Fightin' Blue Hens women's basketball team
