= 2015–16 Towson Tigers men's basketball team =

American college basketball season

2015–16 Towson Tigers men's basketball

Vegas 16, Quarterfinals
- Conference: Colonial Athletic Association
- Record: 20–13 (11–7 CAA)
- Head coach: Pat Skerry (5th season)
- Assistant coaches: Kevin Clark; Jim McCarthy; Bruce Shingler
- Home arena: SECU Arena

2015–16 CAA men's basketball standings
	Conf.				Overall
Team	W		L	PCT	W		L	PCT
Hofstra	14	–	4	.778	24	–	10	.706
UNC Wilmington †	14	–	4	.778	25	–	8	.758
Towson	11	–	7	.611	20	–	13	.606
James Madison	11	–	7	.611	21	–	11	.656
William & Mary	11	–	7	.611	20	–	11	.645
Northeastern	9	–	9	.500	18	–	15	.545
College of Charleston	8	–	10	.444	17	–	14	.548
Elon	7	–	11	.389	16	–	16	.500
Drexel	3	–	15	.167	6	–	25	.194
Delaware	2	–	16	.111	7	–	23	.233
† 2016 CAA tournament winner

The 2015–16 Towson Tigers men's basketball team represented Towson University during the 2015–16 NCAA Division I men's basketball season. The Tigers, led by fifth year head coach Pat Skerry, played their home games at SECU Arena and were members of the Colonial Athletic Association. They finished the season 20–13, 11–7 in CAA play to finish in a three way tie for third place. They lost in the quarterfinals of the CAA tournament to CAA tournament. They were invited to the inaugural Vegas 16, which only had eight teams, where they lost in the quarterfinals to Oakland.

== Previous season ==
The Tigers finished the season 12–20, 5–13 in CAA play to finish in ninth place. They were eliminated in the first round of the CAA tournament where they lost to Elon.

== Departures ==
Name	Number	Pos.	Height	Weight	Year	Hometown	Notes
Four McGlynn	4	G	6'2"	180	RS Junior	York, Pennsylvania	Transferred to Rhode Island
Alex Gavrilovic	11	F	6'9"	245	Senior	Strasbourg, France	Graduated
Jamel Flash	44	F	6'10"	220	RS Senior	West Hempstead, New York	Graduated

=== Incoming transfers ===
Name	Number	Pos.	Height	Weight	Year	Hometown	Previous school
Deshaun Morman	3	G	6'3"	195	Sophomore	Richmond, Virginia	Cincinnati

== Recruiting ==
College recruiting information
Name	Hometown	School	Height	Weight	Commit date
Dennis Tunstall; PF	Medford, New Jersey	Life Center Academy	6 ft 8 in (2.03 m)	180 lb (82 kg)	Mar 18, 2015
Dennis Tunstall; PF	Recruit ratings: Rivals:				
Alex Thomas; PF	Hawthorne, New Jersey	Coastal Academy	6 ft 9 in (2.06 m)	220 lb (100 kg)	Sep 21, 2014
Alex Thomas; PF	Recruit ratings: ESPN: (62)				
Overall recruit ranking:
Note: In many cases, Scout, Rivals, 247Sports, On3, and ESPN may conflict in their listings of height and weight.; In these cases, the average was taken. ESPN grades are on a 100-point scale.; Sources: "Towson 2015 Basketball Commitments". Rivals.; "Towson Tigers". ESPN.; "2015 Team Ranking". Rivals.

== Roster ==
2015–16 Towson Tigers men's basketball team
Players
Coaches

Pos.	#	Name	Height	Weight	Year	Previous school	Hometown
G	0	Josh Ivory	6 ft 2 in (1.88 m)	195 lb (88 kg)	Sr	Baton Rouge CC	Alexandria, Louisiana
G	1	Bryon Hawkins	6 ft 1 in (1.85 m)	175 lb (79 kg)	So	Clinton Christian School	Fort Washington, Maryland
G	2	Jordan McNeil	6 ft 5 in (1.96 m)	185 lb (84 kg)	RS Fr	Mount St. Joseph	Baltimore
G	3	Deshaun Morman (I) (redshirt)	6 ft 3 in (1.91 m)	195 lb (88 kg)	So	Coolidge Senior HS	Richmond, Virginia
F/C	5	Walter Foster	6 ft 8 in (2.03 m)	230 lb (104 kg)	Jr	Booker T. Washington	Atlanta
F	10	John Davis	6 ft 5 in (1.96 m)	215 lb (98 kg)	Jr	Saints John Neumann and Maria Goretti	Philadelphia
F	11	Dennis Tunstall	6 ft 8 in (2.03 m)	205 lb (93 kg)	Fr	Life Center Academy	Medford, New Jersey
F	15	Timajh Parker-Rivera	6 ft 7 in (2.01 m)	215 lb (98 kg)	Sr	St. Joseph	Milford, Connecticut
F	23	Mike Morsell	6 ft 5 in (1.96 m)	190 lb (86 kg)	So	St. John's College HS	Fort Washington, Maryland
F	24	Arnaud William Adala Moto	6 ft 6 in (1.98 m)	225 lb (102 kg)	RS Jr	Episcopal	Yaoundé, Cameroon
G	25	A. J. Astroth	6 ft 6 in (1.98 m)	200 lb (91 kg)	RS Jr	Wharton	Tampa, Florida
F	33	Eddie Keith	6 ft 5 in (1.96 m)	220 lb (100 kg)	So	Edgewater	Orlando, Florida
F	44	Alex Thomas	6 ft 9 in (2.06 m)	220 lb (100 kg)	Fr	Coastal Academy	Hawthorne, New Jersey

Head coach

- Pat Skerry (Tufts)

Assistant coach(es)

- Kevin Clark (Clark)
- Jim McCarthy (Hamilton College)
- Bruce Shingler (St. Augustine's)

Legend

- (C) Team captain
- (S) Suspended
- (I) Ineligible
- (W) Walk-on
- Injured
- Current redshirt

Roster
Last update: July 28, 2015

== Schedule ==
Date time, TV	Opponent	Result	Record	Site (attendance) city, state
Non-conference regular season
November 14*; 3:00 pm	at La Salle	L 76–78	0–1	Tom Gola Arena (3,400); Philadelphia
November 16*; 7:00 pm	Morgan State	W 69–61	1–1	SECU Arena (2,351); Towson, Maryland
November 19*; 2:00 pm, ESPN3	vs. Oklahoma State; Charleston Classic quarterfinals	L 52–69	1–2	TD Arena (1,760); Charleston, South Carolina
November 20*; 3:30 pm, ESPN3	vs. Ole Miss; Charleston Classic consolation round	L 60–76	1–3	TD Arena (1,220); Charleston, South Carolina
November 22*; 1:30 pm, ESPN3	vs. Bradley; Charleston Classic 7th place game	W 62–60	2–3	TD Arena (1,553); Charleston, South Carolina
November 25*; 7:00 pm	Gallaudet	W 88–45	3–3	SECU Arena (1,137); Towson, Maryland
November 28*; 4:00 pm	at Coppin State	W 81–77	4–3	Physical Education Complex (1,201); Baltimore
December 2*; 7:00 pm	George Mason	W 75–54	5–3	SECU Arena (1,562); Towson, Maryland
December 5*; 2:00 pm	Sacred Heart	W 82–74	6–3	SECU Arena (1,303); Towson, Maryland
December 8*; 7:30 pm	at Loyola	W 65–54	7–3	Reitz Arena (892); Baltimore, Maryland
December 18*; 8:00 pm	at Fairleigh Dickinson	L 68–69	7–4	Rothman Center (547); Hackensack, New Jersey
December 20*; 4:30 pm	Rio Grande	W 88–47	8–4	SECU Arena (1,660); Towson, Maryland
December 23*; 2:00 pm	UMBC	W 91–65	9–4	SECU Arena (1,224); Towson, Maryland
CAA Regular Season
December 31; 4:00 pm	at William & Mary	W 76–69	10–4 (1–0)	Kaplan Arena (2,531); Williamsburg, Virginia
January 2; 7:00 pm	Hofstra	L 58–90	10–5 (1–1)	SECU Arena (2,331); Towson, Maryland
January 7; 7:00 pm	UNC Wilmington	W 76–60	11–5 (2–1)	SECU Arena (1,381); Towson, Maryland
January 9; 4:00 pm	at James Madison	L 59-73	11–6 (2–2)	JMU Convocation Center (3,197); Harrisonburg, Virginia
January 14; 7:00 pm	at Delaware	W 79–77	12–6 (3–2)	Bob Carpenter Center (1,727); Newark, Delaware
January 16; 4:00 pm, CSN	Drexel	W 69–50	13–6 (4–2)	SECU Arena (2,000); Towson, Maryland
January 21; 6:00 pm, CSN	College of Charleston	L 37–40	13–7 (4–3)	SECU Arena (1,466); Towson, Maryland
January 23; 1:00 pm	at Northeastern	W 79–72	14–7 (5–3)	Matthews Arena (1,187); Boston
January 28; 7:00 pm	at Drexel	W 77–70	15–7 (6–3)	Daskalakis Athletic Center (962); Philadelphia, Pennsylvania
January 30; 2:00 pm, CSN	Delaware	W 101–97 ^{OT}	16–7 (7–3)	SECU Arena (3,115); Towson, Maryland
February 4; 7:30 pm	at College of Charleston	L 47–65	16–8 (7–4)	TD Arena (2,538); Charleston, South Carolina
February 6; 6:00 pm, CSN	at Elon	W 81–77	17–8 (8–4)	Alumni Gym (1,479); Elon, North Carolina
February 11; 7:00 pm	Northeastern	L 44–47	17–9 (8–5)	SECU Arena (1,578); Towson, Maryland
February 13; 4:00 pm, CSN	William & Mary	W 99–82	18–9 (9–5)	SECU Arena (2,334); Towson, Maryland
February 18; 7:00 pm	at Hofstra	L 82–84	18–10 (9–6)	Mack Sports Complex (1,958); Hempstead, New York
February 20; 2:00 pm, CSN	Elon	W 67–56	19–10 (10–6)	SECU Arena (2,736); Towson, Maryland
February 25; 8:00 pm, CSN	James Madison	W 69–67	20–10 (11–6)	SECU Arena (2,546); Towson, Maryland
February 27; 1:00 pm	at UNC Wilmington	L 68–74	20–11 (11–7)	Trask Coliseum (4,791); Wilmington, North Carolina
CAA tournament
March 5; 8:30 pm, CSN	vs. Northeastern; Quarterfinals	L 60–71	20–12	Royal Farms Arena (3,450); Baltimore
Vegas 16
March 28*; 9:00 pm, CBSSN	vs. Oakland; Quarterfinals	L 72–90	20–13	Mandalay Bay Events Center; Paradise, Nevada
*Non-conference game. ^{#}Rankings from AP Poll. (#) Tournament seedings in parentheses. All times are in Eastern Time.

== See also ==
- 2015–16 Towson Tigers women's basketball team
