= Matt Matheny =

American basketball coach (born 1970)

Current position
- Title: Assistant Coach
- Team: Davidson
- Conference: Atlantic 10

Biographical details
- Born: February 11, 1970 (age 56); Shelby, North Carolina, U.S.
- Education: Davidson ('92)

Coaching career (HC unless noted)
- 1993–2009: Davidson (assistant)
- 2009–2019: Elon
- 2022–present: Davidson (assistant)

Head coaching record
- Overall: 151–168 (.473)

Accomplishments and honors

Championships
- SoCon North Division Championship (2013)

Matt Matheny (born February 11, 1970) is an American college basketball coach who is currently an assistant coach for the Davidson Wildcats.

== Early life ==
In 1992, Matheny graduated from Davidson College. He attended North Iredell High School and lived in Statesville, North Carolina.

== Career ==
Matheny spent 16 seasons, beginning in 1993, as an assistant coach at Davidson College, his alma mater.

Matheny was hired as the head coach for the Elon Phoenix in March 2009, replacing Ernie Nestor.

Matheny led the Phoenix to a 21-12 record in 2012-13, the most victories in a single season by the program at the Division I level and most since the 1973-74 season. Matheny helped Elon win the Southern Conference North Division title in 2013, the program's first division crown since 2006. Matheny also helped Elon to its first postseason appearance at the Division I level, as the team earned an invitation to the CollegeInsider.com Postseason Tournament (CIT) in 2013. He was a finalist for the Hugh Durham Award, which is presented annually to the nation's top mid-major coach by CollegeInsider.com. Matheny was named the 2012-13 Southern Conference Coach of the Year.

== Head coaching record ==
Record table
Season	Team	Overall	Conference	Standing	Postseason
Elon Phoenix (Southern Conference) (2009–2014)
2009–10	Elon	9–23	5–13	T–5th (North)	
2010–11	Elon	14–17	5–13	4th (North)	
2011–12	Elon	15–16	9–9	2nd (North)	
2012–13	Elon	21–12	13–5	1st (North)	CIT First Round
2013–14	Elon	18–14	11–5	T–3rd	
Elon Phoenix (Colonial Athletic Association) (2014–2019)
2014–15	Elon	15–18	6–12	8th	
2015–16	Elon	16–16	7–11	8th	
2016–17	Elon	18–14	10–8	T–4th	
2017–18	Elon	14–18	6–12	T–7th	
2018–19	Elon	11–20	7–11	T–6th	
Elon:		151–168 (.473)	79–98 (.446)		
Total:		151–168 (.473)			
National champion Postseason invitational champion Conference regular season champion Conference regular season and conference tournament champion Division regular season champion Division regular season and conference tournament champion Conference tournament champion
