= Chris Flemmings =

American basketball player (born 1994)

No. 1 – BK Levickí Patrioti
- Position: Shooting guard
- League: Extraliga

Personal information
- Born: March 11, 1994 (age 32) Knoxville, Tennessee, U.S.
- Listed height: 6 ft 5 in (1.96 m)
- Listed weight: 180 lb (82 kg)

Career information
- High school: Green Hope (Cary, North Carolina)
- College: Barton (2012–2014); UNC Wilmington (2015–2017)
- NBA draft: 2017: undrafted
- Playing career: 2017–present

Career history
- 2017: Raptors 905
- 2018–2019: ETHA Engomis
- 2019: Peristeri
- 2019–2020: Vilpas Vikings
- 2020–present: Levickí Patrioti

Career highlights
- Cypriot Super Cup winner (2018); 2× First-team All-CAA (2016, 2017); CAA tournament MVP (2016); Conference Carolinas Player of the Year (2014); First-team All-Conference Carolinas (2014)

Christopher Alexander Flemmings (born March 11, 1994) is an American professional basketball player for BK Levickí Patrioti of the Extraliga. He played college basketball at Barton College and UNC Wilmington.

== Early life and high school ==
Flemmings was born in Knoxville, Tennessee and grew up in Cary, North Carolina. He attended Green Hope High School, where he was a two-time All Tri-Nine Conference selection and graduated as the Falcons all-time leading scorer.

== College career ==
=== Barton ===
Flemmings began his collegiate career at Division II Barton College after being lightly recruited by Division I schools in high school. He became a starter midway through his freshman season and averaged 10.7 points and 3.5 rebounds per game as the Bulldogs made it to the Sweet 16 of the 2013 NCAA Division II men's basketball tournament. As a sophomore, Flemmings averaged 19.6 points and 6.8 rebounds per game and was named the Conference Carolinas Player of the Year and first team All-Conference Carolinas, as well as to the All-District Southeast second team by the National Association of Basketball Coaches (NABC).

=== UNC Wilmington ===
Flemmings transferred to University of North Carolina at Wilmington following his sophomore season at Barton after his mother, Tracy Flemmings, convinced new head Seahawks coach Kevin Keatts to offer him a spot on the team as a walk-on. After sitting out one season due to NCAA transfer rules, Flemmings immediately entered the Seahawks' starting lineup and lead the team with 16.2 points and 5.8 rebounds per game and was the first walk-on to be named first team All-Colonial Athletic Association (CAA). Additionally, he was named the Most Outstanding Player of the 2016 CAA men's basketball tournament as the Seahawks clinched their first NCAA Tournament appearance in ten years. He scored 18 points in 39 minutes in UNCW's first round loss to fourth-seeded Duke in the 2016 NCAA tournament. Following the end of the season, Flemmings was awarded a scholarship for his senior year. As a redshirt senior, Flemmings was again named first team All-CAA after averaging 15.8 points, 5.6 rebounds, 2.2 assists and 1.4 steals per game as the Seahawks won the CAA regular season and conference tournaments for the second straight year. In his final career game, Flemmings scored 18 points with 9 rebounds and 4 assists against nationally ranked Virginia in the 2017 NCAA tournament.

== Professional career ==
=== Raptors 905 ===
Flemmings was selected 7th overall in the 2017 NBA G League draft by the Reno Bighorns and subsequently traded to the Maine Redclaws on draft night. He was cut by the Redclaws at the end of the preseason and was claimed from the player pool by Raptors 905 on November 15, 2017. He was waived by the team on November 27, 2017, after appearing in only four games, averaging 0.8 points per game.

=== ETHA Engomis ===
Flemmings signed with ETHA Engomis of Cyprus Basketball Division A on September 6, 2018. He averaged 16.4 points (6th-highest in the league), 5.6 rebounds, 1.8 assists and 1.1 steals over 24 games and was named Rookie of the Year, 3rd team All-Cyprus League, and All-Import team by EuroBasket.com.

=== Peristeri ===
Following the end of the Division A season, Flemmings signed with Peristeri of the Greek Basket League (GBL) on May 2, 2019, for the last game of the GBL season and the subsequent play-offs.

=== Greensboro Swarm ===
Flemmings was named to the training camp roster of the G League's Greensboro Swarm on October 27, 2019, but was waived by the team on November 4.

=== Vilpas Vikings ===
On November 11, 2019, he signed with Vilpas Vikings of the Korisliiga. Flemmings averaged 10.8 points, 4.0 rebounds, 1.1 assists and 1.5 steals in 12 games before leaving the team.

=== Levickí Patrioti ===
Flemmings signed with BK Levickí Patrioti of the Slovak Extraliga on January 20, 2020.

== Personal ==
Flemmings’ mother, Tracey, played basketball collegiately at Barber–Scotia College and was an all-conference selection at guard. His father, Charles, also played college basketball at Knoxville College and received offers to play professionally overseas. Flemmings’ sister, Candace, was a collegiate rower for the University of Tennessee.
