= Hofstra Pride men's basketball statistical leaders =

The Hofstra Pride men's basketball statistical leaders are individual statistical leaders of the Hofstra Pride men's basketball program in various categories, including points, rebounds, assists, steals, and blocks. Within those areas, the lists identify single-game, single-season, and career leaders. The Pride represent Hofstra University in the NCAA's Coastal Athletic Association.

Hofstra began competing in intercollegiate basketball in 1936. However, the school's record book does not generally list records from before the 1950s, as records from before this period are often incomplete and inconsistent. Since scoring was much lower in this era, and teams played much fewer games during a typical season, it is likely that few or no players from this era would appear on these lists anyway.

The NCAA did not officially record assists as a stat until the 1983–84 season, and blocks and steals until the 1985–86 season, but Hofstra's record books includes players in these stats before these seasons. These lists are updated through the end of the 2020–21 season.

== Scoring ==
Career
Rank	Player	Points	Seasons
1	Charles Jenkins	2,513	2007–08 2008–09 2009–10 2010–11
2	Justin Wright-Foreman	2,327	2015–16 2016–17 2017–18 2018–19
3	Antoine Agudio	2,276	2004–05 2005–06 2006–07 2007–08
4	Steve Nisenson	2,222	1962–63 1963–64 1964–65
5	Loren Stokes	2,148	2003–04 2004–05 2005–06 2006–07
6	Rich Laurel	2,102	1973–74 1974–75 1975–76 1976–77
7	Bill Thieben	2,045	1953–54 1954–55 1955–56
8	Craig “Speedy” Claxton	2,015	1996–97 1997–98 1998–99 1999–00
9	Eli Pemberton	1,982	2016–17 2017–18 2018–19 2019–20
10	David Taylor	1,818	1979–80 1980–81 1981–82 1982–83

Season
Rank	Player	Points	Season
1	Justin Wright-Foreman	948	2018–19
2	Rich Laurel	908	1976–77
3	Steve Nisenson	776	1963–64
4	Steve Nisenson	765	1962–63
5	Bill Thieben	760	1954–55
6	Justin Wright-Foreman	755	2017–18
7	Charles Jenkins	746	2010–11
8	Tyler Thomas	742	2023–24
9	Craig “Speedy” Claxton	706	1999–00
10	Charles Jenkins	702	2009–10
	Cruz Davis	702	2025–26

Single game
Rank	Player	Points	Season	Opponent
1	Justin Wright-Foreman	48	2018–19	William & Mary
	Bill Thieben	48	1954–55	Wilkes
3	Steve Nisenson	47	1964–65	Wagner
4	Steve Nisenson	45	1962–63	West Chester
5	Desure Buie	44	2019–20	Elon
	Demetrius Dudley	44	1992–93	Central Connecticut State
	Steve Nisenson	44	1963–64	Catholic
8	Rich Laurel	43	1976–77	St. Francis Brooklyn
9	Justin Wright-Foreman	42	2018–19	Delaware
	Justin Wright-Foreman	42	2018–19	Northeastern
	Bernard Tomlin	42	1974–75	Oral Roberts
	Bill Thieben	42	1955–56	Wilkes

== Rebounds ==
Career
Rank	Player	Rebounds	Seasons
1	Bill Thieben	1,837	1953–54 1954–55 1955–56
2	Rokas Gustys	1,305	2014–15 2015–16 2016–17 2017–18
3	John Irving	1,186	1974–75 1975–76 1976–77
4	David Taylor	926	1979–80 1980–81 1981–82 1982–83
5	Gary Cheslock	857	1977–78 1978–79 1979–80 1980–81
6	Kenny Adeleke	837	2001–02 2002–03 2003–04
7	Barry White	811	1966–67 1967–68 1968–69
8	Roberto Gittens	809	1997–98 1998–99 1999–00 2000–01
9	Dave Bell	797	1969–70 1970–71 1971–72
10	Quinas Brower	766	1969–70 1970–71 1971–72

Season
Rank	Player	Rebounds	Season
1	Bill Thieben	627	1954–55
2	Bill Thieben	620	1953–54
3	Bill Thieben	590	1955–56
4	Rokas Gustys	442	2015–16
5	John Irving	440	1976–77
6	John Irving	423	1975–76
7	Rokas Gustys	372	2017–18
8	Ed Moor	351	1951–52
9	Jim Boatwright	344	1962–63
10	Rokas Gustys	338	2016–17

Single game
Rank	Player	Rebounds	Season	Opponent
1	Bill Thieben	43	1954–55	Springfield
2	Bill Thieben	38	1953–54	Ohio Wesleyan
3	Bill Thieben	33	1955–56	Wilkes
4	John Irving	28	1975–76	LIU
5	John Irving	27	1975–76	Bucknell
6	Quinas Brower	26	1971–72	West Chester
7	Rokas Gustys	25	2016–17	South Dakota
	Barry White	25	1967–68	St. Francis (NY)
	Barry White	25	1968–69	Albright
	Quinas Brower	25	1970–71	Wilkes

== Assists ==
Career
Rank	Player	Assists	Seasons
1	Craig “Speedy” Claxton	660	1996–97 1997–98 1998–99 1999–00
2	Robbie Weingard	606	1981–82 1982–83 1983–84 1984–85
3	Darius Burton	560	1993–94 1994–95 1995–96 1996–97
4	Desure Buie	548	2015–16 2016–17 2017–18 2018–19 2019–20
5	Frank Walker	522	1985–86 1986–87 1987–88 1989–90
6	Charles Jenkins	489	2007–08 2008–09 2009–10 2010–11
7	Juan'ya Green	463	2014–15 2015–16
8	Jaquan Carlos	399	2021–22 2022–23 2023–24
9	Loren Stokes	377	2003–04 2004–05 2005–06 2006–07
10	Woody Souffrant	362	2001–02 2002–03 2003–04 2004–05

Season
Rank	Player	Assists	Season
1	Juan'ya Green	243	2015–16

Single game
Rank	Player	Assists	Season	Opponent
1	Jaquan Carlos	19	2023–24	Northeastern
2	Robbie Weingard	16	1983–84	Bloomfield

== Steals ==
Career
Rank	Player	Steals	Seasons
1	Craig “Speedy” Claxton	288	1996–97 1997–98 1998–99 1999–00
2	Leroy Allen	286	1983–84 1984–85 1985–86 1986–87
3	Frank Walker	275	1985–86 1986–87 1987–88 1989–90
4	Darius Burton	264	1993–94 1994–95 1995–96 1996–97
5	Charles Jenkins	213	2007–08 2008–09 2009–10 2010–11
6	Desure Buie	203	2015–16 2016–17 2017–18 2018–19 2019–20
7	Loren Stokes	180	2003–04 2004–05 2005–06 2006–07
8	Eric Harvey	160	1979–80 1980–81 1981–82 1982–83
	Doug Mills	160	1982–83 1983–84
10	Erroll Flanigan	158	1987–88 1988–89 1989–90 1990–91

Season
Rank	Player	Steals	Season
1	Craig “Speedy” Claxton	102	1999–00

Single game
Rank	Player	Steals	Season	Opponent
1	Frank Walker	8	1985–86	Rider
	Craig “Speedy” Claxton	8	1998–99	New Hampshire

== Blocks ==
Career
Rank	Player	Blocks	Seasons
1	Greg Washington	275	2007–08 2008–09 2009–10 2010–11
2	David Taylor	178	1979–80 1980–81 1981–82 1982–83
3	Roberto Gittens	138	1997–98 1998–99 1999–00 2000–01
4	Adrian Uter	126	2004–05 2005–06
5	Danny Walker	97	1999–00 2000–01 2001–02 2003–04
6	Greg Springfield	92	1999–00 2000–01
7	Moussa Kone	91	2011–12 2012–13 2013–14 2014–15
8	Dane Johnson	89	2007–08 2008–09
9	David Imes	86	2009–10 2010–11 2011–12 2012–13
	Silas Sunday	86	2023–24 2024–25 2025–26

Season
Rank	Player	Blocks	Season
1	Greg Washington	92	2009–10

Single game
Rank	Player	Blocks	Season	Opponent
1	Greg Springfield	10	1999–00	New Mexico State
	Greg Washington	10	2009–10	UNCW
