= Tom Pecora =

American college basketball coach (born 1958)

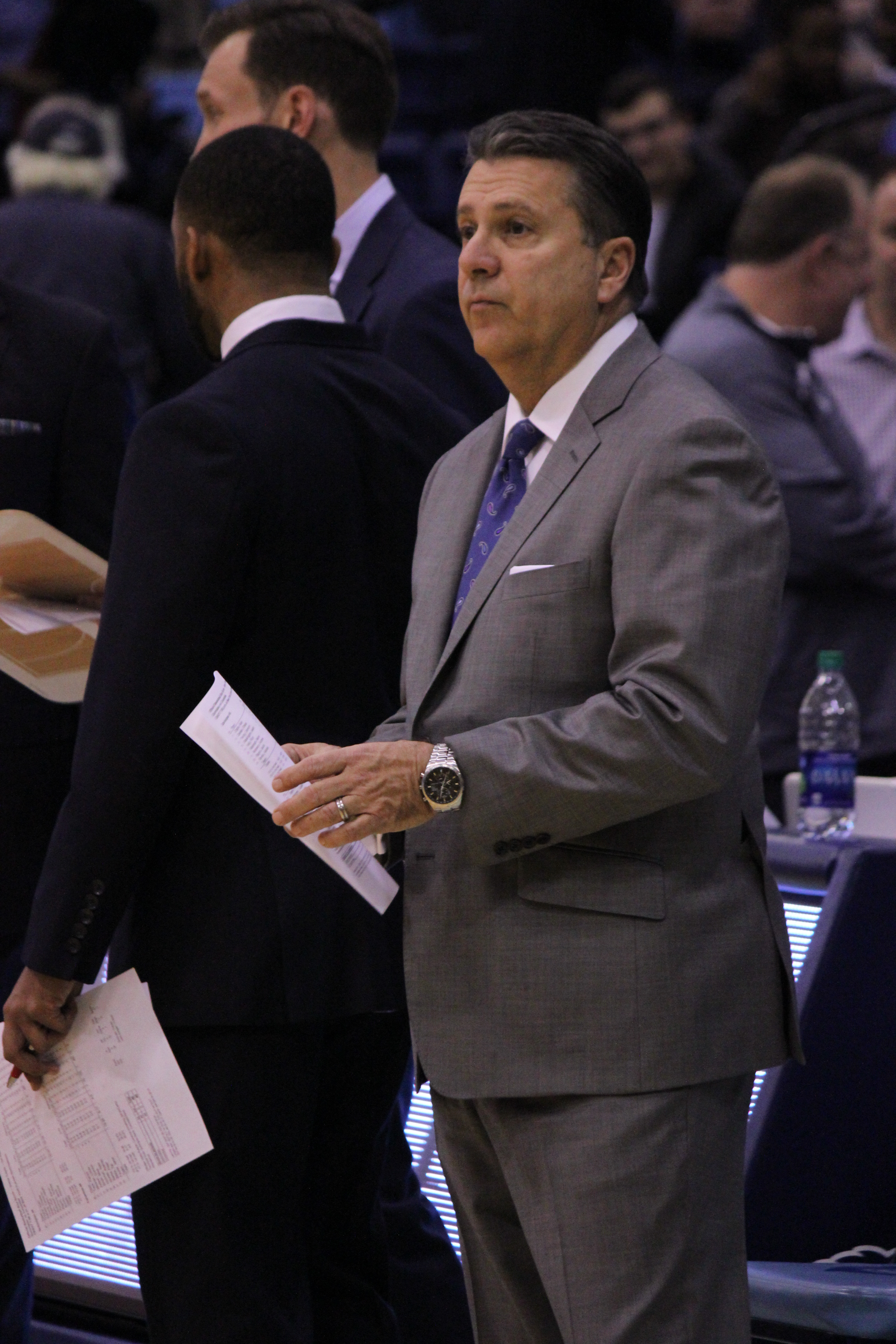
- Pecora in 2017

Current position
- Title: Head coach
- Team: Quinnipiac
- Conference: MAAC
- Record: 65–40 (.619)

Biographical details
- Born: January 21, 1958 (age 68); Queens Village, New York, U.S.
- Education: Adelphi ('83)

Coaching career (HC unless noted)
- 1984–1987: Long Island Lutheran HS (assistant)
- 1987–1989: Nassau CC (assistant)
- 1989–1992: SUNY Farmingdale
- 1992–1993: UNLV (assistant)
- 1993–1994: Loyola Marymount (assistant)
- 1994–2001: Hofstra (assistant)
- 2001–2010: Hofstra
- 2010–2015: Fordham
- 2017–2022: Quinnipiac (associate HC)
- 2022–2023: Quinnipiac (special asst)
- 2023–present: Quinnipiac

Head coaching record
- Overall: 264–272 (.493)
- Tournaments: 2–3 (NIT); 0–2 (CBI)

Accomplishments and honors

Championships
- 2 MAAC regular season (2024, 2025)

Awards
- 2× MAAC Coach of the Year (2024, 2025)

Tom Pecora (born January 21, 1958) is an American college basketball coach who is currently the head coach at Quinnipiac. Pecora was originally hired as associate head coach at Quinnipiac on March 28, 2017, under new head coach Baker Dunleavy.

Pecora has 198 wins as a head coach at the Division I level (Hofstra, Fordham), and 261 wins in his career as a collegiate coach.

Pecora was promoted to the position of head coach at Hofstra University in 2001, taking over for Jay Wright. Following his time at Hofstra, Pecora took over as the permanent replacement at Fordham University after the program fired Dereck Whittenburg during the 2009–10 season.

Pecora served as the head coach at Hofstra for nine years (2001-2010) and at Fordham for five seasons (2010–15). Prior to taking over the head coaching position at Hofstra, Pecora served as the associate head coach under Jay Wright for seven seasons, the last two of which resulted in America East Conference titles and NCAA Tournament berths.

As a head coach at Hofstra, he compiled a 155–126 mark in nine seasons, leading the Pride to four postseason appearances (three NIT and one CBI), more than any team in New York City over that nine-year span. In 16 years at Hofstra with Pecora on the staff (nine years as a head coach, seven as an assistant), the Pride averaged 19 wins a season (246-161).

During his time in Hempstead, Hofstra was the winningest program in the Metropolitan New York area. Over his last six years, Hofstra won 121 games, including four 20-win seasons. In 2006 and 2009, he was named Coach of the Year by the Metropolitan Basketball Writers Association (MBWA) and he also received regional Coach of the Year honors from the National Association of Basketball Coaches (NABC) and the Basketball Coaches Association of New York (BCANY).

Pecora also had tremendous success in developing guards while at Hofstra. As an assistant, he recruited NBA guards Speedy Claxton and Norman Richardson, while as a head coach, he recruited three guards who scored over 2,000 career points: Loren Stokes, Antoine Agudio and Charles Jenkins. Claxton, Richardson, Stokes and Jenkins all won their conference Player of the Year Awards, while Jenkins also played in the NBA for the Golden State Warriors and Philadelphia 76ers.

Pecora assumed the head coaching position for Quinnipiac University on April 13, 2023, following the announcement the university released that same day stating that longtime head coach Baker Dunleavy would be stepping down. Pecora will become the eighth head coach in Quinnipiac men's basketball history and only their fourth coach since the team's transition into the Division 1 scene in 1999.

Over his entire collegiate basketball coaching career, Pecora has a student-athlete graduation rate of 100 percent.

== Division I head coaching record ==
Record table
Season	Team	Overall	Conference	Standing	Postseason
Hofstra Pride (Colonial Athletic Association) (2001–2010)
2001–02	Hofstra	12–20	5–13	9th	
2002–03	Hofstra	8–21	6–12	9th	
2003–04	Hofstra	14–15	10–8	5th	
2004–05	Hofstra	21–9	12–6	4th	NIT Opening Round
2005–06	Hofstra	26–7	14–4	3rd	NIT Quarterfinals
2006–07	Hofstra	22–10	14–4	3rd	NIT First Round
2007–08	Hofstra	12–18	8–10	8th	
2008–09	Hofstra	21–11	11–7	5th	
2009–10	Hofstra	19–15	10–8	7th	CBI First Round
Hofstra:		155–126 (.552)	90–72 (.556)		
Fordham Rams (Atlantic 10 Conference) (2010–2015)
2010–11	Fordham	7–21	1–15	14th	
2011–12	Fordham	10–19	3–13	14th	
2012–13	Fordham	7–24	3–13	14th	
2013–14	Fordham	10–21	2–14	14th	
2014–15	Fordham	10–21	4–14	12th	
Fordham:		44–106 (.293)	13–69 (.159)		
Quinnipiac Bobcats (MAAC) (2023–2026)
2023–24	Quinnipiac	24–10	15–5	1st	CBI First Round
2024–25	Quinnipiac	20–13	15–5	1st	
2025–26	Quinnipiac	19–13	12–8	T–4th	
Quinnipiac Bobcats (Metro Conference) (2026–present)
2026–27	Quinnipiac	2–4	0–0		
Quinnipiac:		65–40 (.619)	42–18 (.700)		
Total:		264–272 (.493)			
National champion Postseason invitational champion Conference regular season champion Conference regular season and conference tournament champion Division regular season champion Division regular season and conference tournament champion Conference tournament champion
