= David Taylor (basketball) =

American basketball player

Personal information
- Listed height: 6 ft 8 in (2.03 m)
- Listed weight: 198 lb (90 kg)

Career information
- High school: Long Beach (Lido Beach, New York)
- College: Hofstra (1979–1983)
- NBA draft: 1983: undrafted
- Playing career: 1983–1984
- Position: Power forward / center

Career history
- 1983–1984: ASVEL

Career highlights
- Federation Cup champion (1984); ECC Player of the Year (1983); 2× First-team All-ECC (1982, 1983); ECC co-Rookie of the Year (1980)

David Taylor is an American former basketball player known for his college career at Hofstra University. A native of Lido Beach, New York, Taylor chose to play for the Hofstra Flying Dutchmen (now Hofstra Pride) after his standout prep career at Long Beach High School in which he averaged 30.5 points and 19 rebounds per game as a senior. At Hofstra, he was named the 1983 East Coast Conference Player of the Year.

== College career ==
Taylor had originally committed to play for Pensacola Junior College in Florida. In the summer of 1978, after his high school graduation, he spent 10 days in Pensacola and took four classes, but then decided he did not want to stay. The NCAA classified that move as a transfer, so Taylor was forced to redshirt (sit out) his true freshman season of 1978–79. When he became eligible the following year, Taylor led the team in scoring at 17.6 points per game and was named the East Coast Conference co-Rookie of the Year. During Taylor's four-year college career, he scored 1,818 points and grabbed 926 rebounds, which were fourth and third all-time in school history, respectively, at the time of his graduation. He was twice named First Team All-ECC as a junior and senior, and in 1982–83 was honored as the ECC Player of the Year.

== Professional career and later life ==
Taylor was not selected in the 1983 NBA draft. He instead played one year of professional basketball in France for ASVEL. That year, ASVEL won the Federation Cup. Taylor then returned to the United States, where he has been active as a middle school and high school basketball coach, an AAU coach, personal trainer, and mentor.
