= 1999–2000 Drexel Dragons men's basketball team =

American college basketball season

1999–2000 Drexel Dragons men's basketball
- Conference: America East Conference
- Record: 13–17 (9–9 AEC)
- Head coach: Steve Seymour (1st season)
- Home arena: Daskalakis Athletic Center

1999–2000 America East Conference men's basketball standings
	Conf.				Overall
Team	W		L	PCT	W		L	PCT
Hofstra †	16	–	2	.889	24	–	7	.774
Maine	15	–	3	.833	24	–	7	.774
Delaware	14	–	4	.778	24	–	8	.750
Vermont	11	–	7	.611	16	–	12	.571
Drexel	9	–	9	.500	13	–	17	.433
Towson	7	–	11	.389	11	–	17	.393
Hartford	6	–	12	.333	10	–	19	.345
Boston University	5	–	13	.278	7	–	22	.241
Northeastern	5	–	13	.278	7	–	21	.250
New Hampshire	2	–	16	.111	3	–	25	.107
† 2000 America East tournament winner Rankings from AP poll

The 1999–2000 Drexel Dragons men's basketball team represented Drexel University during the 1999–2000 NCAA Division I men's basketball season. The Dragons, led by 1st year head coach Steve Seymour, played their home games at the Daskalakis Athletic Center and were members of the America East Conference (AEC).

The team finished the season 13–17, and finished in 5th place in the AEC in the regular season.

== Roster ==
1999–2000 Drexel Dragons men's basketball team
Players	Coaches
Pos. / # / Name / Height / Weight / Year / Previous school / Hometown; / / / — / —	Head coach: Steve Seymour (Bridgewater State); Assistant coach(es) Legend: (C) Team captain; (S) Suspended; (I) Ineligible; (W) Walk-on; Injured; Current redshirt

== Schedule ==
Date time, TV	Rank^{#}	Opponent^{#}	Result	Record	High points	High rebounds	High assists	Site (attendance) city, state
Regular season
November 27, 1999*		at Seton Hall	L 65–69	0–1	–	–	–	Walsh Gymnasium (2,600); South Orange, NJ
Unknown*		at UMBC	L 57–71	1–3	–	–	–	(1,103); Baltimore, MD
Unknown*		vs. Morgan State	W 72–59	2–3	–	–	–	(440); Baltimore, MD
Unknown*		vs. La Salle	L 54–70	2–4	–	–	–	Palestra (2,632); Philadelphia, PA
Unknown*		at George Mason	L 54–79	2–5	–	–	–	(1,555)
Unknown*		at Green Bay	L 54–59	2–6	–	–	–	(3,719); Green Bay, WI
Unknown*		vs. Western Kentucky	W 66–61	3–6	–	–	–	(472); Green Bay, WI
January 25, 2000*		at Penn; Battle of 33rd Street	L 46–54		–	–	–	Palestra (2,409); Philadelphia, PA
AEC tournament
	(5)	vs. (4) Vermont; Quarterfinal	W 71–59	13–16	–	–	–	Bob Carpenter Center (3,150); Newark, DE
	(5)	vs. (1) Hofstra; Semifinal	L 51–69	13–17	–	–	–	Bob Carpenter Center (5,086); Newark, DE
*Non-conference game. ^{#}Rankings from AP. (#) Tournament seedings in parentheses. All times are in Eastern Time.

== Awards ==
Mike Kouser

- AEC All-Conference Second Team
