= 2000–01 Hofstra Pride men's basketball team =

American college basketball season

2000–01 Hofstra Pride men's basketball

America East Champions

NCAA tournament, first round
- Conference: America East Conference
- Record: 26–5 (16–2 AEC)
- Head coach: Jay Wright (7th season)
- Home arena: Hofstra Arena

2000–01 America East Conference men's basketball standings
	Conf.				Overall
Team	W		L	PCT	W		L	PCT
Hofstra †	16	–	2	.889	26	–	5	.839
Delaware	14	–	4	.778	20	–	10	.667
Drexel	12	–	6	.667	15	–	12	.556
Maine	10	–	8	.556	18	–	11	.621
Boston University	9	–	9	.500	14	–	14	.500
Northeastern	8	–	10	.444	10	–	19	.345
Towson	7	–	11	.389	12	–	17	.414
Vermont	7	–	11	.389	12	–	17	.414
New Hampshire	6	–	12	.333	7	–	21	.250
Hartford	1	–	17	.056	4	–	24	.143
† 2001 America East tournament winner Rankings from AP poll

The 2000–01 Hofstra Pride men's basketball team represented Hofstra University from Hempstead, New York in the 2000–01 Season. Led by head coach Jay Wright, Hofstra finished with a record of 26–5, the best in the AEC, and won the AEC tournament. As a result of winning the tournament, Hofstra was invited to the NCAA tournament. Although Hofstra fell in the first round of the tournament, coach Wright departed in the off-season to become the new head coach of Villanova, who he would coach to National Championships in 2016 and 2018. That season marked their final season in the America East Conference. In summer 2001, They moved to the Colonial Athletic Association.

== Postseason results ==
AEC Tournament 3/3/01 @ Bob Carpenter Center, Newark, DE Vs. Vermont W, 68–55
3/4/01 @ Bob Carpenter Center, Newark, DE Vs. Maine W, 78–66
3/10/01 @ Hofstra Arena, Hempstead, NY Vs. Delaware W, 68–54
NCAA Tournament 3/15/01 @ Greensboro Coliseum, Greensboro, NC Vs. UCLA L, 61–48
