= Justin Wright-Foreman =

American basketball player (born 1997)

Justin Wright–Foreman
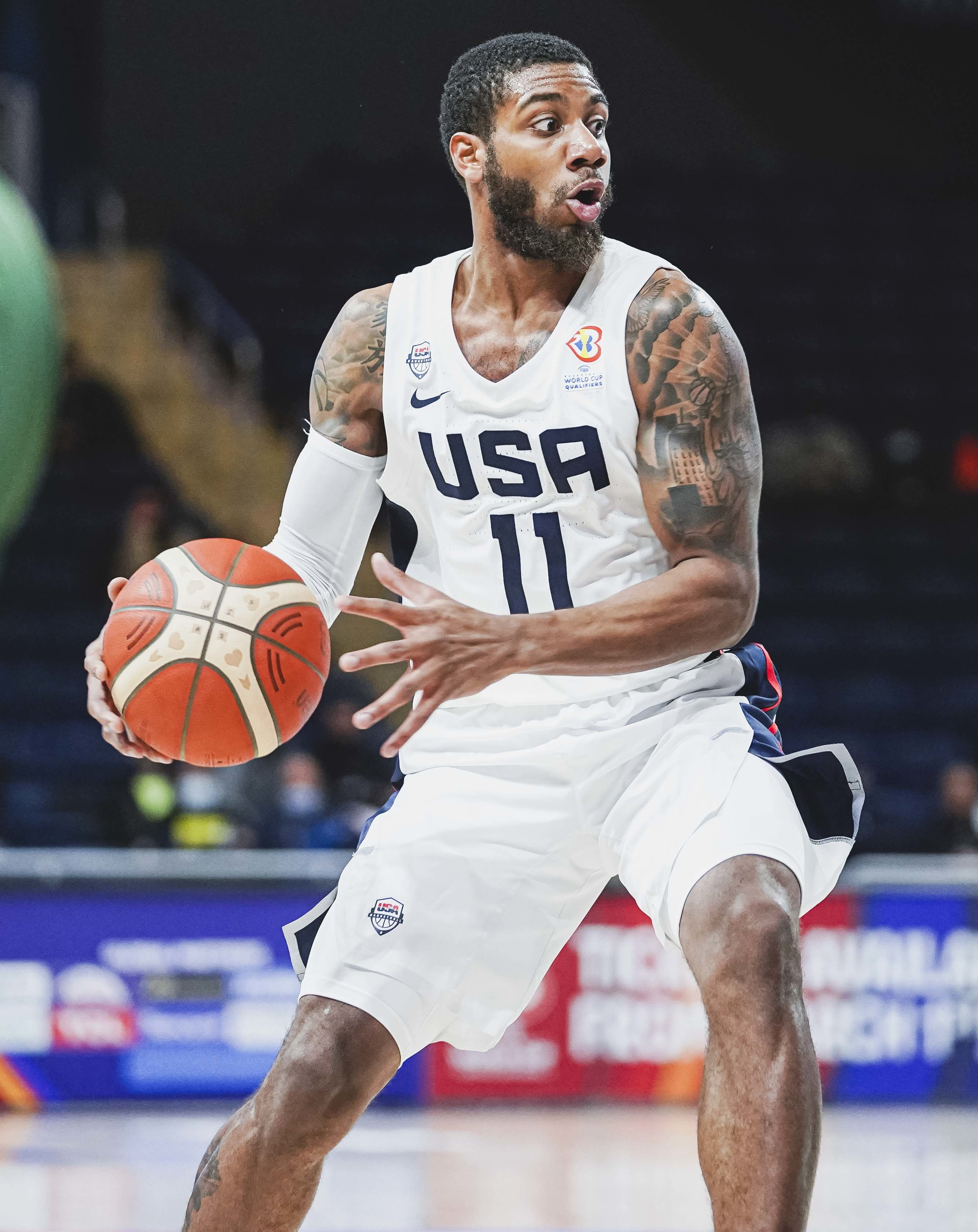
- Wright-Foreman with U.S. national team in 2022

No. 3 – Basket Zaragoza
- Position: Point guard
- League: Liga ACB; Europe Cup

Personal information
- Born: October 27, 1997 (age 29) Queens, New York, U.S.
- Listed height: 6 ft 0 in (1.83 m)
- Listed weight: 190 lb (86 kg)

Career information
- High school: HS for CTEA (Queens, New York)
- College: Hofstra (2015–2019)
- NBA draft: 2019: 2nd round, 53rd overall pick
- Drafted by: Utah Jazz
- Playing career: 2019–present

Career history
- 2019–2020: Utah Jazz
- 2019–2020: →Salt Lake City Stars
- 2021: Erie BayHawks
- 2021: Chorale Roanne Basket
- 2021–2022: Petkim Spor
- 2022: Birmingham Squadron
- 2022: Bamberg
- 2022–2023: Shenzhen Leopards
- 2023: Westchester Knicks
- 2023: Saskatchewan Rattlers
- 2023–2024: Mexico City Capitanes
- 2024: Carpegna Prosciutto Basket Pesaro
- 2024: Winnipeg Sea Bears
- 2024–2025: Al-Rayyan
- 2025–2026: Iraklis Thessaloniki
- 2026–present: Casademont Zaragoza

Career highlights
- 2x CEBL scoring champion (2023, 2024); 2x All-CEBL First Team (2023, 2024); 2× Honorable mention All-American – AP (2018, 2019); 2× CAA Player of the Year (2018, 2019); 2× First-team All-CAA (2018, 2019); Second-team All-CAA (2017)
- Stats at NBA.com
- Stats at Basketball Reference

Justin Jamel Wright–Foreman (born October 27, 1997) is an American professional basketball player for Casademont Zaragoza of the Liga ACB and the Europe Cup. He played college basketball for the Hofstra Pride. He was drafted by the Utah Jazz with the 53rd overall pick in the 2019 NBA draft.

== College career ==
Hofstra coach Joe Mihalich spotted Wright-Foreman at a basketball tournament in Las Vegas where he scored 48 points in a game and offered him a scholarship. He played sparingly as a freshman due to subpar defense. His breakout game came in a blowout loss to Kentucky as a sophomore, where he scored 14 points. In subsequent games, he upped his scoring average substantially, finishing at 18.5 points per game.

As a junior, Wright-Foreman averaged 24.2 points per game, fifth-highest in NCAA Division I. He also contributed 3.1 assists per game, ninth in the Colonial Athletic Association (CAA). He scored over 30 points in seven games. At the conclusion of the regular season he was named CAA Player of the Year. Following the season Wright-Foreman declared for the 2018 NBA draft but did not hire an agent to preserve his collegiate eligibility.

Coming into his senior season, Wright-Foreman was named Preseason CAA Player of the Year. On February 9, 2019, Wright-Foreman tied a single-game school-record (set by Bill Thieben) by scoring 48 points in a win over William & Mary. The points put Wright-Foreman over the 2,000 point mark for his career. He was again named CAA Player of the Year for the 2018–19 season.

== Professional career ==
=== Utah Jazz (2019–2020) ===
In the 2019 NBA draft, Wright-Foreman was selected 53rd overall by the Utah Jazz. On July 16, 2019, Wright-Foreman was signed to a two-way contract by the Jazz. Wright-Foreman scored 26 points and had seven rebounds and five assists for the Salt Lake City Stars in a victory over the Rio Grande Valley Vipers on November 26. On January 24, 2020, he had 30 points, three rebounds, and four assists in a win over the Stockton Kings.

=== Erie BayHawks (2021) ===
On December 19, 2020, Wright-Foreman signed an Exhibit 10 deal with the New Orleans Pelicans, but was waived the same day. On January 12, 2021, he signed as an affiliate player with the Erie BayHawks of the NBA G League, averaging over 12 points and 2 assists in 15 games.

=== Chorale Roanne (2021) ===
On April 21, 2021, Wright-Foreman signed with Chorale Roanne Basket of the LNB Élite. He averaged 16.9 points and 3.6 assists per game.

=== Petkim Spor (2021–2022) ===
On August 20, 2021, Wright-Foreman signed with Petkim Spor of the Turkish Basketbol Süper Ligi. He averaged 16.8 points, 3.7 assists and 2.1 rebounds per game. Wright-Foreman parted ways with the team on January 28, 2022.

=== Birmingham Squadron (2022) ===
On February 10, 2022, Wright-Foreman was acquired and activated by the Birmingham Squadron of the NBA G League.

=== Brose Bamberg (2022) ===
On July 27, 2022, Wright-Foreman signed with Brose Bamberg of the German Basketball Bundesliga.

=== Westchester Knicks (2023) ===
On January 30, 2023, Wright-Foreman was acquired by the Westchester Knicks.

=== Saskatchewan Rattlers (2023) ===
On May 29, 2023, Wright-Foreman signed with the Saskatchewan Rattlers of the Canadian Elite Basketball League. Wright-Foreman led the CEBL in scoring during the 2023 season, averaging 29.2 points per game with Saskatchewan.

=== Mexico City Capitanes (2023–2024) ===
On December 27, 2023, Wright-Foreman joined the Mexico City Capitanes, but was waived on January 27, 2024.

=== Carpegna Prosciutto Basket Pesaro (2024) ===
On February 15, 2024, Wright-Foreman signed with Carpegna Prosciutto Basket Pesaro of the Italian Lega Basket Serie A.

=== Winnipeg Sea Bears (2024) ===
On June 10, 2024, Wright-Foreman signed with the Winnipeg Sea Bears of the Canadian Elite Basketball League.

=== Al-Rayyan (2024–2025) ===
In October 2024, Wright-Foreman signed with Al-Rayyan of the Qatari Basketball League, making his debut on October 21, in a 65–84 loss to Al-Arabi.

=== Iraklis (2025–2026) ===
On June 14, 2025, Wright-Foreman signed a one-year contract with Iraklis of the Greek Basketball League.

=== Basket Zaragoza (2026–present) ===
On February 27, 2026, Wright-Foreman signed a contract until the end of the season with Casademont Zaragoza of the Spanish Liga ACB and the Europe Cup.

== Career statistics ==
Legend
GP	Games played	GS	Games started	MPG	Minutes per game
FG%	Field goal percentage	3P%	3-point field goal percentage	FT%	Free throw percentage
RPG	Rebounds per game	APG	Assists per game	SPG	Steals per game
BPG	Blocks per game	PPG	Points per game	**Bold**	Career high

=== NBA ===
==== Regular season ====
Year	Team	GP	GS	MPG	FG%	3P%	FT%	RPG	APG	SPG	BPG	PPG
2019–20	Utah	4	0	11.3	.350	.200	.750	1.3	1.8	.5	.0	4.8
Career		4	0	11.3	.350	.200	.750	1.3	1.8	.5	.0	4.8

=== College ===
Year	Team	GP	GS	MPG	FG%	3P%	FT%	RPG	APG	SPG	BPG	PPG
2015–16	Hofstra	27	0	4.1	.447	.235	.545	.3	.1	.1	.1	1.6
2016–17	Hofstra	32	17	28.3	.493	.372	.764	3.6	1.6	.8	.1	18.1
2017–18	Hofstra	31	30	**37.8**	.449	.366	.799	3.3	**3.2**	.8	**.2**	24.4
2018–19	Hofstra	**35**	**35**	37.7	**.511**	**.425**	**.864**	**4.0**	2.9	**.9**	**.2**	**27.1**
Career		125	82	28.1	.483	.386	.811	2.9	2.1	.7	.2	18.6
