= Jay Wright =

American basketball coach (born 1961)

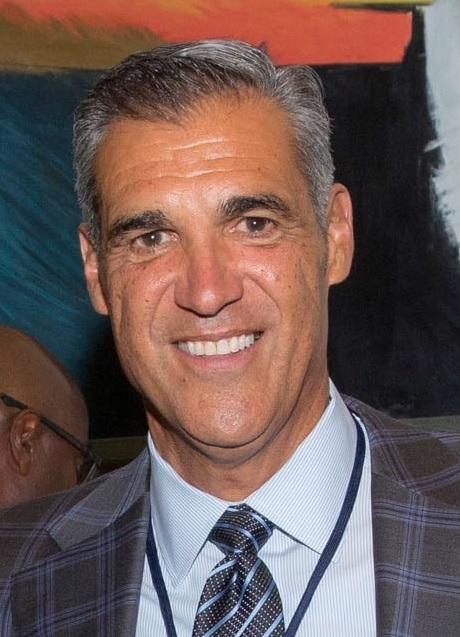
- Wright in 2023

Biographical details
- Born: December 24, 1961 (age 64); Churchville, Pennsylvania, U.S.

Playing career
- 1979–1983: Bucknell

Coaching career (HC unless noted)
- 1984–1986: Rochester (assistant)
- 1986–1987: Drexel (assistant)
- 1987–1992: Villanova (assistant)
- 1992–1994: UNLV (assistant)
- 1994–2001: Hofstra
- 2001–2022: Villanova

Head coaching record
- Overall: 642–282 (.695)
- Tournaments: 34–16 (NCAA Division I); 4–4 (NIT)

Accomplishments and honors

Championships
- 2 NCAA Division I tournament (2016, 2018); 4 NCAA Division I tournament Final Four (2009, 2016, 2018, 2022); 2 America East tournament (2000, 2001); 2 America East regular season (2000, 2001); 5 Big East tournament (2015, 2017, 2018, 2019, 2022); 8 Big East regular season (2006, 2014–2017, 2019, 2021)

Awards
- 2× Naismith College Coach of the Year (2006, 2016): NABC Coach of the Year (2006); John R. Wooden Legends of Coaching Award (2018); AP Coach of the Decade (2010s); 2× America East Coach of the Year (2000, 2001); 6× Big East Coach of the Year (2006, 2009, 2014–2016, 2019)
- Basketball Hall of Fame; Inducted in 2021 (profile)
- College Basketball Hall of Fame; Inducted in 2026
Medal record
Olympic Games
Assistant coach for the United States
Gold medal – first place	2020 Tokyo	Team

Jerold Taylor "Jay" Wright Jr. (born December 24, 1961) is an American former college basketball coach. He served as the head coach of Villanova University from 2001 until 2022. Wright led the Villanova Wildcats to six Big East Conference championships and 16 NCAA tournament appearances in 21 seasons as head coach. Under Wright, Villanova reached four Final Fours (2009, 2016, 2018, 2022) and won two national championships in 2016 and 2018.

Beginning as a four-year player at Bucknell University, he quickly moved to coaching as an assistant at the University of Rochester and then Drexel University. In 1987, Wright returned to the institution he grew up rooting for as an assistant at Villanova under Hall of Fame coach Rollie Massimino. He coached at Villanova for five years, before following Massimino for a stint as an assistant at UNLV.

Wright started his head coaching at Hofstra University (1994–2001), leading the program to NCAA tournament appearances in both 2000 and 2001. Wright was inducted into the Naismith Memorial Basketball Hall of Fame as a member of the 2021 class.

== Early life ==
Born in Churchville, Pennsylvania, Wright grew up a fan of Villanova. As a child, he played Little League Baseball in the Northampton Township Little League, for a team coached by his father Jerry. They finished as runner up in 1972, before winning the championship a year later.

He graduated from Council Rock High School North in Newtown, Bucks County, Pennsylvania, where he played shortstop for the baseball team and quarterback for the football team, but gave both up to focus on basketball. Wright was the starting point guard for the varsity team for his sophomore-through-senior years, including for the 1978–79 Lower Bucks League championship team. His coach Mike Holland later remarked that he showed an early aptitude for coaching.

"I used to have this community basketball clinic where the guys had to teach junior high and elementary kids how to play basketball. At that time, [Wright] was already exhibiting coaching prowess. [...] He was my extension on the floor. I felt very comfortable turning the team over to him."

— Mike Holland, Wright's high school basketball coach

Wright considered playing for Herb Magee at Philadelphia University, but ultimately chose to attend Bucknell University, in Lewisburg, Pennsylvania. There, he joined the Sigma Chi fraternity, and majored in economics and sociology, graduating in 1983.

While at Bucknell, Wright joined the basketball team led by coach Charlie Woollum. He played for the Bison for three seasons, overlapping with future NBA player Al Leslie and future Bucknell coach Pat Flannery, who Wright has since credited as a mentor. Wright became the starting point guard during the 1980–81 season, his junior year, leading the team in scoring, and was named team MVP. His senior year saw him named co-captain of the Bison, but he lost his starting job, an experience he found humbling. He shared the team's Malcolm Musser Leadership Award at the end of the season.

== Coaching career ==
=== Early coaching career ===
Upon graduating from college, Wright got his first job as an assistant coach at Division III University of Rochester, having been recommended by Woollum, his college coach, and former teammate Flannery. There, he recruited for the school, organised intramural sports, and coached junior varsity. In 1986, after two years with the Yellowjackets, he got his first position in Division I college basketball as an assistant coach at Drexel University, joining Flannery on the staff. His next job came as an assistant to Rollie Massimino at Villanova, where he remained from 1987 to 1992. In 1992, he moved with Massimino to UNLV, where he remained until 1994.

=== Hofstra (1994–2001) ===
In 1994, Wright was named head coach at Hofstra University, which had struggled through most of the 1980s and early '90s, with only one season of 20 or more wins since 1980, and no NCAA tournament appearances since 1977. Hofstra's athletic director Jim Garvey remarked that Wright was "an outstanding recruiter," something the school was in need of improving. His hiring coincided with Hofstra's move to the North Atlantic Conference.

Hofstra went 10–18 in Wright's first season, finishing with the worst conference record in the NAC in the regular season, although they did secure a win over Maine in the conference tournament. Losing seasons followed for the next two years, with Hofstra going 9–18 and 12–15 respectively, although they did improve their finish in the conference each time – to 7th and 4th. Come the 1997–98 season, the Flying Dutchmen secured their first winning season for 12 years. With a roster featuring future NBA players Speedy Claxton and Norm Richardson, Hofstra defeated Hartford to reach the semi-finals of the now-renamed America East tournament, before losing to eventual tournament champions Delaware, to finish the year with a 19–12 record. Claxton was named the America East Conference Player of the Year, having finished first in the conference and seventh in the country for assists per game and led Hofstra in points per game.

The 1998–99 season saw a third-place finish in the conference, and another semi-final AEC tournament exit, this time at the hands of Drexel. But with Hofstra's first 20-win season since 1991–92, they secured a bid to the 1999 National Invitation Tournament, the school's first ever appearance in the tournament, and their first postseason appearance in 22 years. The Dutchmen ultimately lost in the first round to Rutgers, 58–45. A first conference title arrived the following season – Hofstra both topped the regular season standings outright and won the conference tournament, after securing victories over Boston University, Drexel, and two-time defending champions Delaware. With the tournament victory, Hofstra secured a berth in the NCAA tournament, for the school's first appearance since 1977. Handed a 14th-seed, the Dutchmen were matched up against the 3rd-seed Oklahoma State Cowboys, who were ranked 14th in the nation in the AP Poll, but were unable to provide an upset, losing 86–66. Having broken the school record for victories in a season with 24, Wright earned AEC Coach of the Year honors. Claxton won his second conference Player of the Year award, having finished fourth in the nation in scoring, with 23.2 points per game.

Under Wright, the program slowly and steadily improved, and by 1999 the Pride were a premier team in the America East Conference. They won the conference championship in 2000 and 2001, and from 1999 to 2001, went 72–22, including two NCAA tournament appearances. Wright was named America East Coach of the Year in 1999–2000 and 2000–01. He was also tabbed Eastern Basketball's Coach of the Year in 1999–2000.

Wright took the Pride to the Postseason three times:

- 1999 NIT: Hofstra was defeated by Rutgers University 68–45 in the first round
- 2000 NCAA Tournament: As a #14 seed, Hofstra lost to Oklahoma State University 86–66 in the first round.
- 2001 NCAA Tournament: As a #13 seed, Hofstra was defeated in the first round 61–48 by UCLA.

=== Villanova (2001–2022) ===
==== Three NIT appearances (2001–2004) ====
After receiving offers from Tennessee and Rutgers for their head coaching roles, Wright instead chose to return to Villanova, becoming the eighth coach in the 81-year history of the program. Wright inherited a mediocre team from previous coach Steve Lappas, and in Wright's first season, they made the NIT. In 2002, Wright was able to secure one of the top-rated recruiting classes in the country, led by McDonald's All-American center Jason Fraser. However, the Wildcats had a mediocre 2002–03 season, which was marred by a phone card abuse scandal that eventually resulted in suspensions to over half the roster. The Wildcats again made the NIT but did not advance far. The 2003–04 season saw more playing time for the talented young players from the previous recruiting class, but it also resulted in a mediocre season and another NIT appearance. Villanova advanced as far as the quarterfinals in the NIT, doing so in 2002 and 2004. Wright's NIT appearances in his first three years were considered by most fans to be failures and he entered his fourth year considered to be on the hottest seat in the Big East.

==== Sweet Sixteen and Elite Eight runs (2004–2008) ====
In the 2004–05 season, Wright's Wildcats enjoyed a breakout campaign thanks to the emergence of forward Curtis Sumpter and guards Allan Ray and Randy Foye. Villanova finished 22–7 in a year that included upset wins over No. 2 Kansas and No. 3 Boston College. They were rewarded with a fifth seed in the NCAA tournament, the Wildcats' first appearance in the tournament since 1999. Villanova defeated New Mexico and Florida to advance to the sweet 16. However, their tournament run came to an end next round after a narrow loss to North Carolina, the No. 1 seed (and eventual champion). Villanova was ranked 19th in the final Associated Press poll, their first such appearance in eight years.

The 2005–06 season saw the Wildcats ranked in the preseason top four of both major polls, thanks to the return of most players from the previous season. Led by seniors Ray and Foye, and an explosive sophomore in Kyle Lowry, the Wildcats lived up to the hype and finished with a 25–4 regular season record, including a 14–2 record in the Big East regular season, which tied them with University of Connecticut for first place in the conference.

In the 2006 NCAA tournament, Wright's experienced team earned a No. 1 seed for the first time in school history and posted victories over Monmouth in the first round and Arizona in the second. Wright's squad then narrowly edged Boston College to advance to the Elite 8 for the first time since 1988. However, the Wildcats run ended there, as they lost to eventual champion Florida. This marked the second consecutive year in which Wright's Wildcats were eliminated by the eventual national champion.

For his performance in the 2005–06 season, Wright received national coach of the year honors from CBS/Chevrolet; the Naismith Awards; and the National Association of Basketball Coaches (NABC). He was also named the Big East Coach of the Year.

The 2006–07 squad had to replace three starters, but thanks in part to the healthy return of Curtis Sumpter, who had missed the previous season with an ACL injury, and McDonald's All-American Scottie Reynolds, the Wildcats made it back to the NCAA tournament for the third straight season. With a 22–10 record, they were seeded ninth but lost to Kentucky in the second round.

In the 2007 offseason, Wright once again came up with a highly rated recruiting class, this time led by McDonald's All-American Corey Stokes and Jordan Brand All-American Corey Fisher.

The 2007–08 season saw Villanova struggle at times, including a five-game losing streak in the middle of the season. Wright and the Wildcats were able to rebound to get a 12 seed (the final at-large seed) in the NCAA tournament. They upset fifth-seeded Clemson in round one, and beat Siena in round two to advance to their third Sweet 16 in four years. The team once again lost to the eventual champs, which this time was the Kansas Jayhawks.

==== Final Four appearance and upsets (2008–2012) ====
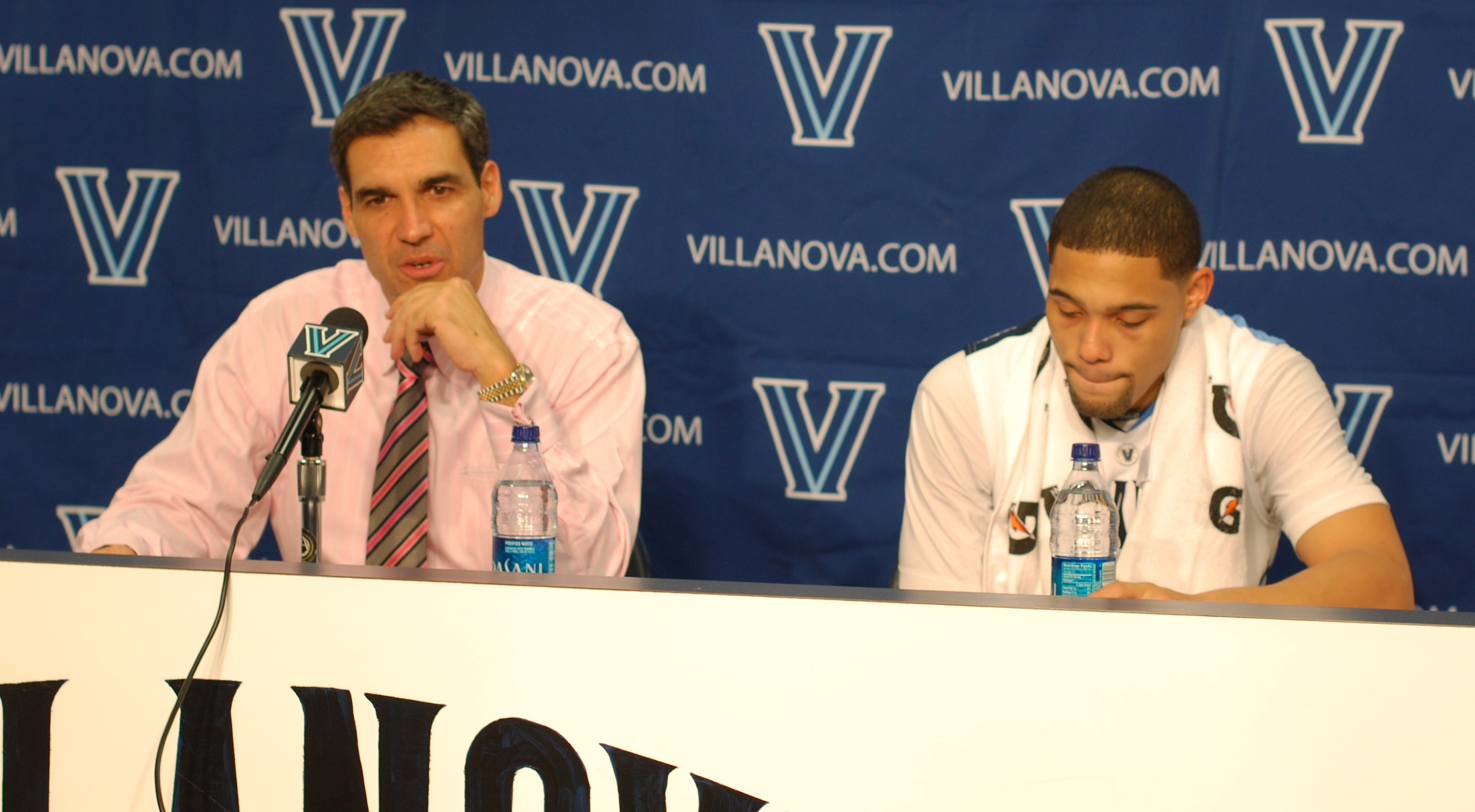
Jay Wright with Scottie Reynolds at a press conference on December 23, 2009

The 2008–09 team, led by senior Dante Cunningham, junior Scottie Reynolds and breakout sixth man Corey Fisher, streaked to a fourth-place finish in the Big East, and a double bye in the conference tournament. The third-seeded Wildcats overcame a double-digit halftime deficit to underdog American to avoid a first-round upset in the NCAA tournament. The team then defeated sixth-seeded UCLA by twenty points to make the program's fourth Sweet Sixteen in five years. In its Sweet Sixteen matchup against Duke, the Wildcats used timely perimeter defense to score a 23-point victory and a trip to the Elite Eight. In a back-and-forth Elite Eight game with then-conference rival Pitt, Reynolds came up big with a game-winning shot to put Villanova back in the Final Four for the first time since their national championship run in 1985. Villanova then fell to North Carolina, the eventual champions, in the National Semifinals at Ford Field in Detroit, Michigan by a score of 83–69.

For the 2009–10 season, Wright brought in a recruiting class in the top five of the national rankings. The class was highlighted by point guard Maalik Wayns (Philadelphia/Roman Catholic), forwards Isaiah Armwood (Rockville, Md./Montrose Christian School) and Mouphtaou Yarou (Nattingou, Benin; also attending the same Montrose Christian School) and guard Dominic Cheek (Jersey City, NJ / St. Anthony's). Taylor King, a former McDonald's All-American and Duke transfer, also joined the rotation, after redshirting the '08–'09 season. The Wildcats earned a two seed in the NCAA tournament, but after a rocky start in the tournament, highlighted by Scottie Reynolds and Corey Fisher being benched to start the game, fell in the second round of play to Saint Mary's.

The Wildcats got off to a 16–1 start, and were ranked as high as sixth in the nation. However, they went 5–11 the rest of the way, including six straight losses to finish the season. The final two losses were particularly tough, as Villanova lost to South Florida in the Big East tournament before falling to George Mason in the Round of 64 in the NCAA tournament.

Faced with a young team after the departures of seniors Corey Fisher and Corey Stokes, the Wildcats endured their worst season under Wright, finishing 13–19. It was the only season in the Wright era where Villanova did not compete in any postseason tournaments. They did manage a victory in the opening round of the Big East tournament, defeating Rutgers 70–49, before falling to South Florida for the second consecutive season.

==== Return to postseason and first national championship (2012–2016) ====
Villanova's recent struggles prompted some to speculate that Wright's job was in danger. However, with the help of sophomores Darrun Hilliard and JayVaughn Pinkston, as well as freshmen Ryan Arcidiacono and Daniel Ochefu, the Wildcats returned to respectability, winning 20 games and returning to the NCAA Tournament. Though they fell to North Carolina in the Round of 64, the Wildcats picked up some signature wins, defeating #5 Louisville and #3 Syracuse in the span of a week. They also ended the regular season with wins over #17 Marquette and #5 Georgetown.

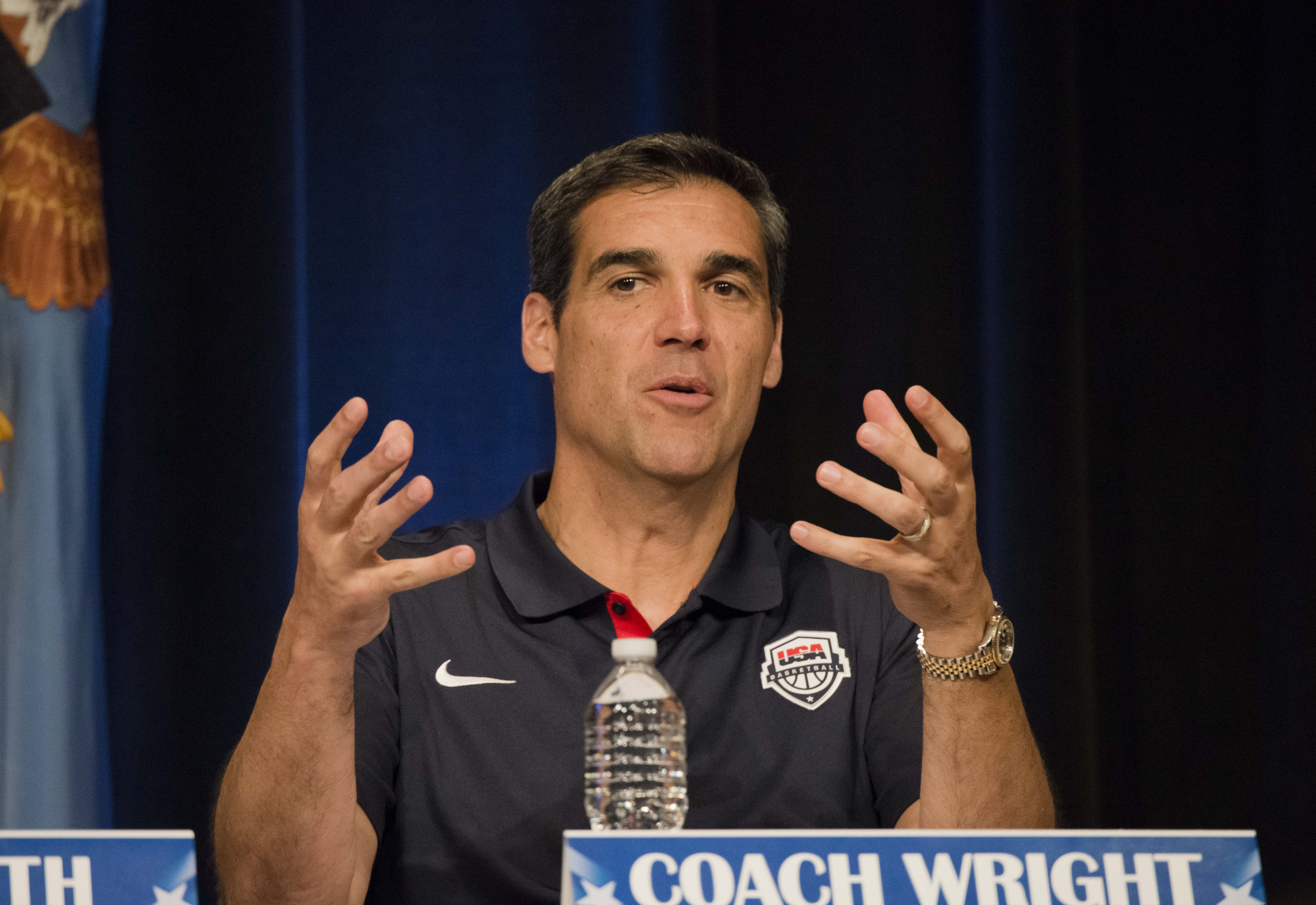
Wright speaking at the Sports Leadership Seminar at the Pentagon in 2014

In the first season of the current Big East Conference, formed after Villanova and six other schools broke away from the original Big East Conference, Villanova was the #2 seed in the East and lost in the second round to Connecticut, the #7 seed and eventual national champion.

In the 2015 NCAA tournament, Villanova was the #1 seed in the East and lost in the second round to North Carolina State, the #8 seed.

Villanova earned a #2 seed in the South Region of the 2016 NCAA tournament, defeating UNC Asheville, Iowa, Miami and Kansas to advance to the Final Four for the first time since 2009. In the national semifinal, Villanova defeated Oklahoma 95–51, the largest margin of victory in Final Four history. The Wildcats then proceeded to defeat North Carolina in the national title game, 77–74, on a 3-point shot by Kris Jenkins as time expired, earning Wright his first championship.

In addition to the record shattering 44-point defeat of Oklahoma in the Final Four, the 2016 championship run included numerous other notable achievements. Villanova was the first school without an FBS football program to win the NCAA men's title since Villanova's own championship in 1985. They were also the first team in 31 years (again, since the 1985 Villanova team) to dispatch four straight AP top 10 teams (Miami, Kansas, Oklahoma and North Carolina) in their run, and 5 total AP ranked teams (Iowa, in addition to the previously mentioned teams). They were also the only team since the 1985 Villanova championship squad to beat four straight top-3 seeds on their championship run: two 1 seeds (Kansas and North Carolina), one 2 seed (Oklahoma) and one 3 seed (Miami). Villanova's performance included two of the most offensively efficient games ever recorded since the analytics era began in 2002, tallying 1.56 and 1.51 points per possession against 3-seed Miami and 2-seed Oklahoma, respectively. Villanova's average margin of victory for the tournament was nearly 21 points per game, and the only teams they defeated by less than 19 points were Kansas and North Carolina (the overall first and second seeded teams in the tournament, whom they beat by 5 and 3 points, respectively). It has been called perhaps the most dominant tournament championship run of all time, and the most dominant of the analytics era by a wide margin.

==== Second national championship (2016–2019) ====
In the 2017 NCAA tournament, Villanova was the #1 seed in the East and lost in the second round to Wisconsin, the #8 seed.

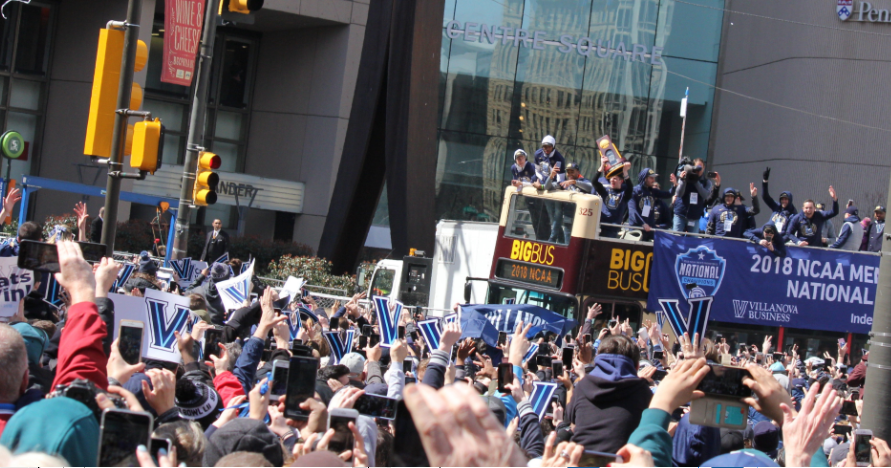
2018 parade in Center City, Philadelphia

Shortly before the start of the 2017–18 season, Wright was named the recipient of the 2018 Legends of Coaching Award, part of the annual John R. Wooden Award program. Villanova earned a #1 seed in the East Region, defeating Radford, Alabama, West Virginia, and Texas Tech to advance to the Final Four for the second time in three years. In the National Semifinal, Villanova defeated Kansas 95–79. The Wildcats then proceeded to defeat Michigan in the National Championship Game, 79–62 to give Wright his second championship in three years. Assistant head coach Ashley Howard left Villanova on April 8, 2018, to become the head coach at La Salle University, a Philadelphia Big 5 rival.

Wright faced a difficult task after his second national title. Last year's departures included Mikal Bridges, Donte DiVincenzo, Omari Spellman, and Jalen Brunson, who were each taken in the 2018 NBA draft. As a result, Wright was left with a young, inexperienced squad entering the season. Villanova stood at #8 in the preseason rankings, but they were crushed by Michigan in a title game rematch in their third game of the season. They later fell to Furman in overtime at home, dropping them from the Top 25 entirely. After losing to top-ranked Kansas in December, Villanova won 11 in a row and returned to the national rankings. A February win over #10 Marquette allowed them to clinch the Big East regular season title. They would then go on to defeat Providence, Xavier, and Seton Hall to win their third consecutive Big East tournament, becoming the first team to do so. Wright earned his sixth Big East Coach of the Year Award for his efforts. The Wildcats finished 26–10 and earned a sixth seed in the NCAA Tournament. They would defeat 11th-seeded St. Mary's in the Round of 64 by 4, before falling to Purdue 87–61.

==== Final Four run and retirement (2019–2022) ====
The Wildcats ended their season with a 24–7 record. Villanova's 13–5 record in Big East play allowed them to clinch a share of the conference's regular season title, tying with Creighton and Seton Hall. The Wildcats were seeded second in the Big East tournament, but the tournament was cancelled early due to the COVID-19 pandemic. Oddly, the Big East tournament was the last conference tournament to be cancelled, which resulted in games being played despite other conferences canceling their games.

Despite losing sophomore Saddiq Bey to the first round of the NBA draft, Wright and the Wildcats were ranked third in the opening AP poll to start the season. Villanova got off to an 8–1 start (which included wins over No. 18 Arizona State and No. 17 Texas) but was forced to temporarily shut down when Wright and several other members of the program tested positive for COVID-19. With an 11–4 conference record, the Wildcats clinched at least a share of the regular season title for the third consecutive season, clinching it with a win over Creighton on March 3. However, Villanova was ousted in the quarterfinal round of the conference tournament in an upset loss to eventual champion Georgetown after losing co-Big East Player of the Year Collin Gillespie (sharing with teammate Jeremiah Robinson-Earl and Sandro Mamukelashvili of Seton Hall) to an injury. Many felt that, without Gillespie, the Wildcats would be subjected to a quick exit at the NCAA Tournament, where they were seeded fifth in the South region. Villanova instead topped twelfth-ranked Winthrop and thirteenth-ranked North Texas to return to the Sweet 16 before losing to Baylor 62–51.

Ranked fourth in the initial Associated Press poll, the Wildcats stumbled to a 7–4 start. Villanova had fallen to 23rd in the rankings by late December before going 19–3 over the rest of the regular season. The Big East's regular-season championship went to Providence, whose .824 winning percentage beat Villanova's at .800. Wright earned his fifth Big East tournament title and second-seeded Villanova's sixth overall as they topped Creighton in the championship round. Gillespie was named the conference tournament MVP after earning Big East Player of the Year honors. For their efforts, the Wildcats were granted a No. 2 seed in the NCAA Tournament, where they topped #15 Delaware, #7 Ohio State, #11 Michigan, and #5 Houston to advance to the Final Four, before losing 81–65 to eventual champion Kansas. He retired following the season, with former assistant Kyle Neptune succeeding him as head coach.

== Head coaching record ==
Record table
Season	Team	Overall	Conference	Standing	Postseason
Hofstra Flying Dutchmen (North Atlantic Conference / America East Conference) (1994–2001)
1994–95	Hofstra	10–18	5–11	9th	
1995–96	Hofstra	9–18	5–13	T–7th	
1996–97	Hofstra	12–15	9–9	4th	
1997–98	Hofstra	19–12	11–7	T–3rd	
1998–99	Hofstra	22–10	14–4	3rd	NIT First Round
1999–00	Hofstra	24–7	16–2	1st	NCAA Division I Round of 64
2000–01	Hofstra	26–5	16–2	1st	NCAA Division I Round of 64
Hofstra:		122–85 (.589)	76–48 (.613)		
Villanova Wildcats (Big East Conference) (2001–2022)
2001–02	Villanova	19–13	7–9	5th	NIT Quarterfinal
2002–03	Villanova	15–16	8–8	T–3rd	NIT Opening Round
2003–04	Villanova	18–17	6–10	11th	NIT Quarterfinal
2004–05	Villanova	24–8	11–5	T–3rd	NCAA Division I Sweet 16
2005–06	Villanova	28–5	14–2	T–1st	NCAA Division I Elite Eight
2006–07	Villanova	22–11	9–7	7th	NCAA Division I Round of 64
2007–08	Villanova	22–13	9–9	T–8th	NCAA Division I Sweet 16
2008–09	Villanova	30–8	13–5	4th	NCAA Division I Final Four
2009–10	Villanova	25–8	13–5	T–2nd	NCAA Division I Round of 32
2010–11	Villanova	21–12	9–9	T–9th	NCAA Division I Round of 64
2011–12	Villanova	13–19	5–13	T–13th	
2012–13	Villanova	20–14	10–8	T–7th	NCAA Division I Round of 64
2013–14	Villanova	29–5	16–2	1st	NCAA Division I Round of 32
2014–15	Villanova	33–3	16–2	1st	NCAA Division I Round of 32
2015–16	Villanova	35–5	16–2	1st	NCAA Division I Champion
2016–17	Villanova	32–4	15–3	1st	NCAA Division I Round of 32
2017–18	Villanova	36–4	14–4	2nd	NCAA Division I Champion
2018–19	Villanova	26–10	13–5	1st	NCAA Division I Round of 32
2019–20	Villanova	24–7	13–5	T–1st	Postseason cancelled due to COVID-19
2020–21	Villanova	18–7	11–4	1st	NCAA Division I Sweet 16
2021–22	Villanova	30–8	16–4	2nd	NCAA Division I Final Four
Villanova:		520–197 (.725)	244–123 (.665)		
Total:		642–282 (.695)			
National champion Postseason invitational champion Conference regular season champion Conference regular season and conference tournament champion Division regular season champion Division regular season and conference tournament champion Conference tournament champion

== Coaching tree ==
Assistant coaches under Wright who became NCAA or NBA head coaches:

- Tom Pecora, Hofstra (2001–2010), Fordham (2010–2015), Quinnipiac (2023–present)
- Joe Jones, Columbia (2003–2010), Boston University (2011–present)
- Billy Lange, Navy (2004–2011), Saint Joseph's (2019–2025)
- Fred Hill, Rutgers (2006–2010)
- Jason Crafton, Nyack (2012–2018), Maryland Eastern Shore (2019–2024)
- Pat Chambers, Boston University (2009–2011), Penn State (2011–2020), Florida Gulf Coast (2022–present)
- Doug West, Penn State Altoona (2015–2016)
- Baker Dunleavy, Quinnipiac (2017–2023), Villanova (General Manager, 2023–present)
- Ashley Howard, La Salle (2018–2022)
- Kyle Neptune, Fordham (2021–2022), Villanova (2022–2025)
- Keith Urgo, Fordham (2022–2025)
- Adam Fisher, Temple (2023–present)
- George Halcovage, Buffalo (2023–present)

== International coaching career ==
Wright has coached, as a head coach or assistant coach, basketball teams representing the United States three times in international competitions. He led Team USA to a gold medal at the 2005 World University Games as head coach, and was an assistant coach in the 2000 World Championship for Young Men Qualifying Tournament. Wright coached the American team in the 2007 Pan Am Games to a fifth-place finish, with a 3–2 record.

== Personal life ==
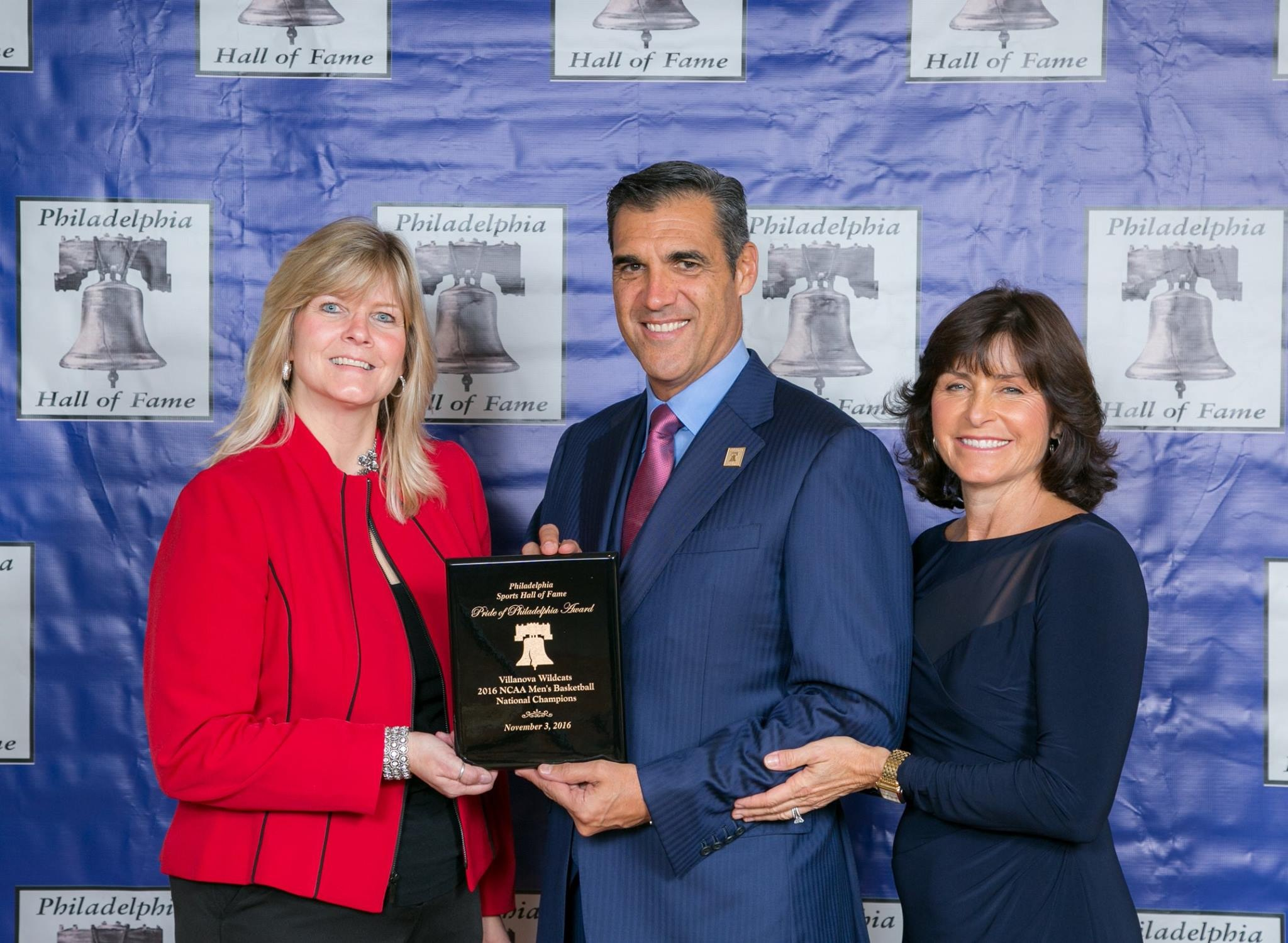
Jay Wright with his wife Patricia (right) at his induction into the Philadelphia Sports Hall of Fame in 2016

Wright met Villanova cheerleader Patricia (née Reilly) in 1983 while working together in the marketing department of the Philadelphia Stars of the United States Football League. She went on to attend Delaware Law School. They married in 1991, and together they have three children. In 2016, the couple were jointly awarded the inaugural Saint Augustine Medal by the Augustinians Province of St. Thomas of Villanova, for "exemplify[ing] the spirit and teachings of Saint Augustine, a deep commitment to the Order of Saint Augustine and the Augustinian values of Truth, Unity and Charity."

Their eldest child, Taylor, played college baseball for Brown between 2012 and 2015, as a pitcher. He worked for Villanova's baseball team as Operations Director, before transitioning to basketball himself, becoming head coach for the Episcopal Academy in Newtown Township, Pennsylvania.

Wright has been noted for his fashion sense since his high school days: he was named best-looking and best-dressed in his senior class at Council Rock High. The Philadelphia Inquirer called him "the best dressed man in college basketball," while President Barack Obama described him as the "George Clooney of coaches". He is a two-time winner of The Runway to the Fashionable Four, an award given by Tim Capstraw to the best-dressed coach in college basketball from 1998 until 2002, and won a further two when the concept was taken on by Collegeinsider.com. He has had clothing deals with Hugo Boss and Philadelphia-area clothier Gabriele D'Annunzio, who tailored suits for him.

In 2022, Wright joined CBS Sports and TNT Sports as a college basketball analyst following his retirement from coaching, serving in the role until 2025.
