= Robbie Weingard =

American basketball player (born 1963)

Personal information
- Born: May 15, 1963 (age 63) Brooklyn, New York, U.S.
- Listed height: 5 ft 10 in (1.78 m)
- Listed weight: 163 lb (74 kg)

Career information
- High school: Wayland-Cohocton (Wayland, New York)
- College: Hofstra (1981–1985)
- NBA draft: 1985: undrafted
- Position: Point guard

Career highlights
- NCAA assists leader (1985)

Robbie Weingard (born May 15, 1963) is an American former basketball player known for his college career at Hofstra University. Between 1981 and 1985, Weingard played point guard for the Hofstra Pride. He set still-standing program records for assists in a game (16) and season (228). As a senior in 1984–85, Weingard averaged an NCAA Division I-leading 9.50 assists per game, en route to becoming only the fourth officially recognized NCAA assists leader at that point.

After graduating, Weingard played for Team USA in the 1985 Maccabiah Games, helping them to win a gold medal. He never played professionally.

== See also ==
- List of NCAA Division I men's basketball season assists leaders
