= 2000–01 Drexel Dragons men's basketball team =

American college basketball season

2000–01 Drexel Dragons men's basketball
- Conference: America East Conference
- Record: 15–12 (12–6 AEC)
- Head coach: Steve Seymour (2nd season)
- Home arena: Daskalakis Athletic Center

2000–01 America East Conference men's basketball standings
| | Conf. | | | | Overall |
| Team | W | | L | PCT | W | | L | PCT |
|---|---|---|---|---|---|---|---|---|
| Hofstra † | 16 | – | 2 | .889 | 26 | – | 5 | .839 |
| Delaware | 14 | – | 4 | .778 | 20 | – | 10 | .667 |
| Drexel | 12 | – | 6 | .667 | 15 | – | 12 | .556 |
| Maine | 10 | – | 8 | .556 | 18 | – | 11 | .621 |
| Boston University | 9 | – | 9 | .500 | 14 | – | 14 | .500 |
| Northeastern | 8 | – | 10 | .444 | 10 | – | 19 | .345 |
| Towson | 7 | – | 11 | .389 | 12 | – | 17 | .414 |
| Vermont | 7 | – | 11 | .389 | 12 | – | 17 | .414 |
| New Hampshire | 6 | – | 12 | .333 | 7 | – | 21 | .250 |
| Hartford | 1 | – | 17 | .056 | 4 | – | 24 | .143 |
† 2001 America East tournament winner Rankings from AP poll

The 2000–01 Drexel Dragons men's basketball team represented Drexel University during the 2000–01 NCAA Division I men's basketball season. The Dragons, led by 2nd-year head coach Steve Seymour, played their home games at the Daskalakis Athletic Center and were members of the America East Conference (AEC).

The team finished the season 15–12 and finished in 3rd place in the AEC in the regular season. They were defeated by Northeastern in the quarterfinals of the America East tournament.

== Roster ==
2000–01 Drexel Dragons men's basketball team
| Players | Coaches |
|---|---|
| Pos. / # / Name / Height / Weight / Year / Previous school / Hometown; / / / — / — | Head coach: Steve Seymour (Bridgewater State); Assistant coach(es) Legend: (C) Team captain; (S) Suspended; (I) Ineligible; (W) Walk-on; Injured; Current redshirt |

== Schedule ==
| Date time, TV | Rank^{#} | Opponent^{#} | Result | Record | High points | High rebounds | High assists | Site (attendance) city, state |
Regular season
| December 3, 2000 | | Delaware | W 82–70 | 2–2 (0–1) | – | – | – | Daskalakis Athletic Center (2,064); Philadelphia, PA |
| December 9, 2000* | | vs. Saint Joseph's | L 54–68 | 2–4 | 23 – Starks | 5 – Tied | – | Palestra (4,337); Philadelphia, PA |
| Unknown* | | vs. Davidson | W 84–73 | 4–5 | – | – | – | (16,628); Albuquerque, NM |
| Unknown* | | at New Mexico | L 60–93 | 4–6 | – | – | – | (16,705); Albuquerque, NM |
| Unknown | | at Boston University | W 74–62 | 5–7 | – | – | – | (606) |
| January 10, 2001* | | at Penn; Battle of 33rd Street | W 68–63 | 6–7 | – | – | – | Palestra (3,033); Philadelphia, PA |
| Unknown | | Maine | W 88–83 | | – | – | – | Daskalakis Athletic Center (1,534); Philadelphia, PA |
| Unknown | | New Hampshire | W 89–74 | | – | – | – | Daskalakis Athletic Center (1,156); Philadelphia, PA |
| Unknown | | Boston University | W 80–71 | | – | – | – | Daskalakis Athletic Center (1,928); Philadelphia, PA |
| Unknown | | at New Hampshire | L 85–93 | | – | – | – | (673) |
| Unknown | | at Maine | L 78–92 | 15–10 | – | – | – | (4,139) |
AEC tournament
| | (3) | vs. (6) Northeastern; Quarterfinals | L 73–74 | 15–12 | – | – | – | Bob Carpenter Center (4,294); Newark, DE |
*Non-conference game. ^{#}Rankings from AP. (#) Tournament seedings in parentheses. All times are in Eastern Time.

== Awards ==
Mike Kouser

- AEC All-Conference First Team
- AEC Player of the Week (2)

Joe Linderman

- AEC All-Conference Second Team

Stephen Starks

- AEC All-Conference First Team
