= Antoine Agudio =

American professional basketball player

Personal information
- Born: January 20, 1985 (age 41) Huntington Station, New York, U.S.
- Listed height: 6 ft 3 in (1.91 m)
- Listed weight: 185 lb (84 kg)

Career information
- High school: Walt Whitman (Huntington Station, New York)
- College: Hofstra (2004–2008)
- NBA draft: 2008: undrafted
- Playing career: 2008–2016
- Position: Point guard / shooting guard

Career history
- 2008: Banvit
- 2009–2010: Albuquerque Thunderbirds
- 2010–2011: VOO Verviers-Pepinster
- 2011–2016: Canton Charge

Career highlights
- 2× First-team All-CAA (2007, 2008); Second-team All-CAA (2006); Third-team All-CAA (2005); CAA Rookie of the Year (2005); CAA All-Rookie Team (2005)

Antoine Marcus Agudio (born January 20, 1985) is an American former professional basketball player. He played college basketball for Hofstra University.

== High school career ==
Agudio attended Walt Whitman High School in Huntington Station, New York. As a junior in 2001–02, he averaged 22 points per game, and as a senior in 2002–03, he averaged 24.9 points per game, earning All-Long Island honors both years and a pair of Long Island Championships. He also earned first team All-New York State as a senior.

== College career ==
After redshirting the 2003–04 season due to a broken hand, Agudio started all 30 games in 2004–05, becoming the first Hofstra freshman to start every game since Speedy Claxton in 1996–97. He went on to be named the 2005 Colonial Athletic Association (CAA) Rookie of the Year. He was also named to the CAA All-Rookie team, All-CAA third team and CAA All-Tournament team. He averaged 15.1 points, 3.2 rebounds, and 2.4 assists per game.

In his sophomore season, he became the first sophomore in school history to reach the 1,000-point plateau in an NIT second round win over Saint Joseph's. He was named to the All-CAA second team and NABC All-District second team. In 33 games (all starts), he averaged 17.2 points, 2.9 rebounds and 2.7 assists per game.

In his junior season, he was named to the All-CAA first team and NABC All-District first team. He was also named the Most Valuable Player of the Aeropostale Holiday Festival. In 32 games (all starts), he averaged 20.2 points, 4.0 rebounds and 2.6 assists per game.

In his senior season, he was named to the All-CAA first team and NABC All-District first team for the second straight year. In 27 games, he averaged 22.7 points, 3.9 rebounds and 2.9 assists per game.

In 2021, Agudio was inducted into the Hofstra University Athletics Hall of Fame.

== Professional career ==
=== Banvit B.K. (2008-2009) ===
Agudio went undrafted in the 2008 NBA draft. He later signed with Banvit B.K. of Turkey for the 2008–09 season. In December 2008, he left Banvit after 16 games.

=== Albuquerque Thunderbirds (2009-2010) ===
On January 29, 2009, he was acquired by the Albuquerque Thunderbirds of the NBA Development League.

In November 2009, Agudio was reacquired by the Albuquerque Thunderbirds. In 2009–10, he played 50 games (43 starts), averaging 15.1 points on .463 shooting (.463 from three-point range), 2.5 rebounds, 2.8 assists and 1.0 steal in 32.1 minutes per game.

=== VOO Verviers-Pepinster (2010-2011) ===
In July 2010, Agudio joined the Milwaukee Bucks for the 2010 NBA Summer League. In August 2010, he signed with VOO Verviers-Pepinster of Belgium for the 2010–11 season. On February 10, 2011, he parted ways with VOO Verviers-Pepinster after 15 games.

=== Canton Charge (2011-2016) ===
On December 1, 2011, Agudio signed with the Canton Charge for the 2011–12 season.

In November 2012, Agudio was reacquired by the Charge.

In November 2013, Agudio was reacquired by the Charge.

On November 2, 2014, Agudio was again reacquired by the Charge.

On October 30, 2015, Agudio returned to Canton, where he would spend one final professional basketball season before retiring in 2016.

== Personal ==
Agudio's father, Alex, also attended Walt Whitman High School and later played college basketball for Penn State.
