= Steve Seymour (basketball) =

American basketball coach (born 1959)

Biographical details
- Born: May 18, 1959 (age 67); Rockland, Massachusetts, U.S.

Playing career
- ?–1981: Bridgewater State

Coaching career (HC unless noted)
- 1988–1991: Saint Anselm (asst.)
- 1991–1999: Drexel (asst.)
- 1999–2001: Drexel
- 2001–2004: Siena (asst.)
- 2004–2005: La Salle (asst.)
- 2005–2009: Virginia (asst.)

Steve Seymour (born 18 May 1959) is an American basketball coach. From 1999 though 2001, he was the head coach at Drexel University. He has also held a variety of collegiate assistant coaching positions.

== Early life ==
Seymour is a graduate of Bridgewater State University in Bridgewater, Massachusetts. He holds a bachelor of science degree in physical education from the school. Following his graduation from Bridgewater State, Seymour spent eight years teaching high school, and coached a girl's high school basketball team to two New Hampshire state titles.

== Coaching career ==
In 1986, Seymour was hired as a part-time assistant basketball coach at Saint Anselm College in Goffstown, New Hampshire. He became a full-time assistant in 1989. In 1991, Bill Herrion left an assistant coaching position George Washington to take-over as head coach at Drexel. Herrion added Seymour to his staff upon his arrival at Drexel, as the two had gotten to know one another on the recruiting trail. During Seymour's eight-season tenure on Herrion's staff, the Dragons won 167 games, won the America East Conference regular season title four times, the America East Conference tournament three times, made three NCAA tournament appearances (including the program's first tournament win as a Division I program in 1996), and made one appearance in the NIT.

Following the 1998-99 season, Herrion left Drexel to take-over as head coach at East Carolina. Seymour was immediately tapped to succeed Herrion. He was fired by the university on March 7, 2001, following the completion of his second season as head coach. Under Seymour, Drexel compiled an overall record of 28-29, and never finished higher than third in the America East Conference. Reaction to Seymour's firing was generally negative in the Philadelphia area. He was succeeded as Drexel's head coach by Bruiser Flint, who had recently resigned as head coach at UMass. Seymour's termination coincided with Drexel's departure from the America East Conference, and joining of the Colonial Athletic Association.

Seymour originally interviewed for a position on Jim Baron's staff at Rhode Island, before eventually being hired by Siena. Following an assistant coaching stint at La Salle, Seymour spent four years on Dave Leitao's staff at the University of Virginia. He was not retained by incoming coach Tony Bennett in 2009.

== Personal life ==
Seymour and his wife Doreen have three children. Sean Seymour

== Career head coaching record ==
Record table
Season	Team	Overall	Conference	Standing	Postseason
Drexel (America East Conference) (1999–2001)
1999–00	Drexel	13-17	9-9	5th	
2000–01	Drexel	15-12	12-6	3rd	
Drexel:		28-29	21-15		
Total:		28-29			
National champion Postseason invitational champion Conference regular season champion Conference regular season and conference tournament champion Division regular season champion Division regular season and conference tournament champion Conference tournament champion
