= John Irving (basketball) =

American basketball player (1953–2015)

Personal information
- Born: May 24, 1953 Baton Rouge, Louisiana, U.S.
- Died: April 12, 2015 (aged 61) Atlanta, Georgia, U.S.
- Listed height: 6 ft 9 in (2.06 m)
- Listed weight: 215 lb (98 kg)

Career information
- High school: Howard (Wilmington, Delaware)
- College: Arizona (1972–1973); Hofstra (1974–1977)
- Playing career: 1977–1987
- Position: Power forward / center

Career history
- 1977: Toyota Tamaraws
- 1980–1981: Royal SC Anderlecht
- 1982–1983: Elitzur Tel Aviv
- 1983–1985: Beitar Tel Aviv

Career highlights
- NCAA rebounding leader (1975)
- Stats at Basketball Reference

John Irving (May 24, 1953 – April 12, 2015) was an American college basketball player best known for his career at Hofstra, which lasted from 1974–75 to 1976–77. He also spent one season (1972–73) at Arizona before transferring. Irving, a 6 ft 9 in (2.06 m), 215-lb (98 kg) power forward/center, recorded 1,018 points and 1,186 rebounds during his three-year career at Hofstra. He holds career per-game averages of 13.2 points and 15.4 rebounds at the school, and is the last Hofstra player to average a double-digit number of rebounds in three consecutive seasons. He led NCAA Division I in rebounding during his sophomore year of 1974–75 with a 15.3 per-game average. Irving was a member of two NCAA Tournament teams, and after he graduated was selected in the third round (58th overall) by the Detroit Pistons in the 1977 NBA draft, although he never played in the league. Previously, he was also selected by the Phoenix Suns in the ninth round (150th overall) in 1976. He is still only one of two players in Hofstra University history to accumulate both 1,000 points and 1,000 rebounds during his career (Bill Thieben is the other), and has been honored as an inductee in the school's Athletics Hall of Fame as part of the 2011 class.

After college, Irving played for the Toyota Tamaraws in the Philippine Basketball Association, helping the team win the 1977 Invitational Championships, then in Anderlecht (Belgium), before playing three years in Israel for Elitzur Tel Aviv and Beitar Tel Aviv. He then moved to England for a year before playing for Ahrend Donar in the Netherlands.

== See also ==
- List of NCAA Division I men's basketball season rebounding leaders
