= 1999–2000 Hofstra Flying Dutchmen basketball team =

American college basketball season

1999–2000 Hofstra Flying Dutchmen men's basketball

America East regular season and tournament champions

NCAA tournament, First round
- Conference: America East Conference
- Record: 24–7 (16–2 AEC)
- Head coach: Jay Wright (6th season)
- Home arena: Hofstra Arena

1999–2000 America East Conference men's basketball standings
| | Conf. | | | | Overall |
| Team | W | | L | PCT | W | | L | PCT |
|---|---|---|---|---|---|---|---|---|
| Hofstra † | 16 | – | 2 | .889 | 24 | – | 7 | .774 |
| Maine | 15 | – | 3 | .833 | 24 | – | 7 | .774 |
| Delaware | 14 | – | 4 | .778 | 24 | – | 8 | .750 |
| Vermont | 11 | – | 7 | .611 | 16 | – | 12 | .571 |
| Drexel | 9 | – | 9 | .500 | 13 | – | 17 | .433 |
| Towson | 7 | – | 11 | .389 | 11 | – | 17 | .393 |
| Hartford | 6 | – | 12 | .333 | 10 | – | 19 | .345 |
| Boston University | 5 | – | 13 | .278 | 7 | – | 22 | .241 |
| Northeastern | 5 | – | 13 | .278 | 7 | – | 21 | .250 |
| New Hampshire | 2 | – | 16 | .111 | 3 | – | 25 | .107 |
† 2000 America East tournament winner Rankings from AP poll

The 1999–2000 Hofstra Flying Dutchmen basketball team represented Hofstra University from Hempstead, New York in the 1999–2000 season. Led by head coach Jay Wright, Hofstra finished with a record of 24–7, the best in the AEC, and won the AEC tournament. As a result of winning the tournament, Hofstra was invited to the NCAA tournament.

This was the final season that Hofstra's sports teams were known as the Flying Dutchmen and Flying Dutchwomen. In summer 2000, the school officially changed their nickname to the Pride.

== Postseason results ==
AEC Tournament 3/4/00 @ Bob Carpenter Center, Newark, DE Vs. Boston U. W, 80–62
(N.A) 3/5/00 @ Bob Carpenter Center, Newark, DE Vs. Drexel W, 69–51
3/11/00 @ Mack Sports Complex, Hempstead, NY Vs. Delaware W, 76–69 (5,124) NCAA Tournament 3/17/00 @ Marine Midland Arena, Buffalo, NY Vs. Oklahoma State L, 86–66
