= 2000 America East men's basketball tournament =

- Classification: Division I
- Season: 1999–00
- Champions: Hofstra (1st title)
- Winning coach: Jay Wright (1st title)
- MVP: Speedy Claxton (Hofstra)

1999–2000 America East Conference men's basketball standings
	Conf.				Overall
Team	W		L	PCT	W		L	PCT
Hofstra †	16	–	2	.889	24	–	7	.774
Maine	15	–	3	.833	24	–	7	.774
Delaware	14	–	4	.778	24	–	8	.750
Vermont	11	–	7	.611	16	–	12	.571
Drexel	9	–	9	.500	13	–	17	.433
Towson	7	–	11	.389	11	–	17	.393
Hartford	6	–	12	.333	10	–	19	.345
Boston University	5	–	13	.278	7	–	22	.241
Northeastern	5	–	13	.278	7	–	21	.250
New Hampshire	2	–	16	.111	3	–	25	.107
† 2000 America East tournament winner Rankings from AP poll

The 2000 America East men's basketball tournament was hosted by the Delaware Blue Hens at Bob Carpenter Center. The final was held at Hofstra Arena on the campus of Hofstra University. Hofstra gained its first America East Conference Championships and an automatic berth to the NCAA tournament with its win over Delaware. Hofstra was given the 14th seed in the East Regional of the NCAA Tournament and lost in the first round to Oklahoma State 86–66. Delaware gained a bid to the NIT and lost in the first round to Villanova 72–63.

== Bracket and Results ==
First round
8	Boston University	83
9	Northeastern	57
7	Hartford	117
10	New Hampshire	88

Second round
1	Hofstra	80
8	Boston University	62
4	Vermont	59
5	Drexel	71
2	Maine	80
7	Hartford	63
3	Delaware	79
6	Towson	69

Semifinals
1	Hofstra	69
5	Drexel	51
2	Maine	46
3	Delaware	68

Finals
1	Hofstra	76
3	Delaware	69

== See also ==
- America East Conference
