= Rich Laurel =

American basketball player (born 1954)

Personal information
- Born: July 11, 1954 (age 72) Philadelphia, Pennsylvania, U.S.
- Listed height: 6 ft 6 in (1.98 m)
- Listed weight: 190 lb (86 kg)

Career information
- High school: Overbrook (Philadelphia, Pennsylvania)
- College: Hofstra (1973–1977)
- NBA draft: 1977: 1st round, 19th overall pick
- Drafted by: Portland Trail Blazers
- Playing career: 1977–1986
- Position: Shooting guard
- Number: 5, 12

Career history
- 1977–1978: Milwaukee Bucks
- 1978–1981: Hurlingham Trieste
- 1982–1984: AS Monaco Basket
- 1985–1986: Basket Groot Willebroek

Career highlights
- Haggerty Award winner (1977); ECC Player of the Year (1977); No. 21 retired by Hofstra Pride
- Stats at NBA.com
- Stats at Basketball Reference

Richard Laurel (born July 11, 1954) is an American former professional basketball player. He played college basketball for the Hofstra Pride and played one season for the Milwaukee Bucks of the National Basketball Association (NBA).

A 6-foot-6-inch (1.98 m) shooting guard born in Philadelphia, Laurel played college basketball at Hofstra University. He played one season (1977–78) in the National Basketball Association as a member of the Milwaukee Bucks. Laurel scored 24 points in ten games. The following season he signed with the New Jersey Nets but was waived before the start of the season. He later played in Italy (Hurlingham Trieste), France and Belgium.

== Career statistics ==
Legend
GP	Games played	GS	Games started	MPG	Minutes per game
FG%	Field goal percentage	3P%	3-point field goal percentage	FT%	Free throw percentage
RPG	Rebounds per game	APG	Assists per game	SPG	Steals per game
BPG	Blocks per game	PPG	Points per game	**Bold**	Career high

=== NBA ===
==== Regular season ====
Year	Team	GP	MPG	FG%	FT%	RPG	APG	SPG	BPG	PPG
1977–78	Milwaukee	10	5.7	.328	1.000	1.0	.3	.3	.1	2.4
