= 2001 America East men's basketball tournament =

- Classification: Division I
- Season: 2000–01
- Champions: Hofstra (2nd title)
- Winning coach: Jay Wright (2nd title)
- MVP: Roberto Gittens (Hofstra)

2000–01 America East Conference men's basketball standings
	Conf.				Overall
Team	W		L	PCT	W		L	PCT
Hofstra †	16	–	2	.889	26	–	5	.839
Delaware	14	–	4	.778	20	–	10	.667
Drexel	12	–	6	.667	15	–	12	.556
Maine	10	–	8	.556	18	–	11	.621
Boston University	9	–	9	.500	14	–	14	.500
Northeastern	8	–	10	.444	10	–	19	.345
Towson	7	–	11	.389	12	–	17	.414
Vermont	7	–	11	.389	12	–	17	.414
New Hampshire	6	–	12	.333	7	–	21	.250
Hartford	1	–	17	.056	4	–	24	.143
† 2001 America East tournament winner Rankings from AP poll

The 2001 America East men's basketball tournament was hosted by the Delaware Blue Hens at Bob Carpenter Center . The final was held at Hofstra Arena on the campus of Hofstra University. Hofstra gained its second consecutive berth to the NCAA tournament with its win over Delaware. Hofstra was given the 13th seed in the East Regional of the NCAA Tournament and lost in the first round to UCLA 61–48.

== Bracket and Results ==
First round
8	Vermont	78
9	New Hampshire	72
7	Towson	65
10	Hartford	62

Second round
1	Hofstra	68
8	Vermont	55
4	Maine	87*
5	Boston U.	83
2	Delaware	66
7	Towson	51
3	Drexel	73
6	Northeastern	74

Semifinals
1	Hofstra	78
4	Maine	66
2	Delaware	110
6	Northeastern	66

Finals
1	Hofstra	68
2	Delaware	54

* Game Ended in Overtime

== See also ==
- America East Conference
