= Steve Nisenson =

American former basketball player

Steve H. Nisenson is an American former basketball player, who played the guard position.

He set Hofstra University's all-time scoring record in basketball, which stood for 43 years. He also set the all-time national college season free-throw record in 1964, becoming the first college player to have a free throw percentage of better than .900.

== Early life ==
Nisenson is Jewish, and was from Livingston, New Jersey where he played basketball for Livingston High School. He earned a bachelor's degree in business management at Hofstra, and a master's degree in guidance and counseling at Long Island University.

== Basketball career ==
=== College career ===
Nisenson played basketball for Hofstra University from 1962 to 1965, where he was an All-American in both 1963 and 1964, and was the team's ball-handler and playmaker. He was also elected to the Eastern College Athletic Conference small college All-East team in 1963, 1964, and 1965. In 1964, he was a unanimous selection as the most valuable basketball player in the Middle Atlantic Conference northern college division.

He set the school's career scoring record with 2,222 points, and it was not broken until 2008. At the time that he set the record, there were only three years of eligibility, and there were not any 3-point shots. The record stood for 43 years.

His 1963–64 season scoring average of 27.7 points per game is the second-highest total in Hofstra history. His career average of 26.8 points per game is also the second-highest in school history.

He set the all-time national college free-throw record in 1964, becoming the first college player to have a free-throw percentage of better than .900. In 1963–64 he had a .913 free throw percentage, which is still a Hofstra single-season record. Nisenson also holds the Hofstra single-season record for free throws made (230), in the same season. His career free throw percentage (.879) is the second-best all-time in Division II history.

=== After college ===
He played on the United States basketball team that won a gold medal at the 1965 Maccabiah Games in Israel, along with Tal Brody, Ronald Green, Steve Chubin, and Ron Watts.

Nisenson was drafted by the New York Knicks with the 37th pick overall, in the fifth round of the 1965 NBA draft. He was at the team's training camp, but did not make the team.

He turned down an offer to play with the Kentucky Colonels of the ABA. Instead, he chose to coach basketball at Hofstra.

Nisenson later was the director of admissions at C.W. Post for 16 years.

== Honors ==
In 2002, Nisenson was inducted into the National Jewish Sports Hall of Fame in New York.

He was inducted into the Hofstra Athletics Hall of Fame in 2006 Hofstra also retired his jersey number (13), during the 2008–09 season.
