= Bill Thieben =

American basketball player (1935–2021)

Personal information
- Born: March 28, 1935 Suffolk County, New York, U.S.
- Died: April 15, 2021 (aged 86)
- Listed height: 6 ft 7 in (2.01 m)
- Listed weight: 215 lb (98 kg)

Career information
- High school: Sayville (West Sayville, New York)
- College: Hofstra (1953–1956)
- NBA draft: 1956: 3rd round, 22nd overall pick
- Drafted by: Fort Wayne Pistons
- Playing career: 1956–1958
- Position: Power forward / center
- Number: 10, 9

Career history
- 1956–1958: Fort Wayne / Detroit Pistons

Career highlights
- Haggerty Award winner (1956); No. 93 retired by Hofstra Pride

Career statistics
- Points: 337 (4.0 ppg)
- Rebounds: 272 (3.2 rpg)
- Assists: 24 (0.3 apg)
- Stats at NBA.com
- Stats at Basketball Reference

William Bernard Thieben (March 28, 1935 – April 15, 2021) was an American professional basketball player. He played in the National Basketball Association (NBA) for the Fort Wayne Pistons in 1956–57 and the Detroit Pistons in 1957–58 (the franchise was moved between the two seasons). He was selected in the 1956 NBA draft by the Fort Wayne Pistons. He played college basketball for the Hofstra Pride.

== Early life and college ==
Thieben was a native of Suffolk County, New York, and attended Sayville High School from 1948 to 1952. On February 26, 1952, he scored a school record 48 points in a game against Northport (record since tied). Sayville won the contest, 85–66.

He decided to stay close to home when he went to college and enrolled at nearby Hofstra University. Due to NCAA rules at the time, freshmen were not allowed to play varsity sports. Thieben, therefore, had to play for the school's freshman team. Hofstra was classified as a Division II institution when he first entered college, but Thieben went on to have one of the greatest all-around basketball careers in NCAA history, regardless of classification.

In 1953–54, his sophomore year, he became eligible to play. Standing at 6 ft 7 in (2.01 m) tall and weighing 215 pounds, Thieben is considered the first "big man" in Hofstra basketball history. He played in 24 games that season and averaged 24.6 points and 25.8 rebounds per game. That rebounding average is the 11th-highest in Division II history. In Thieben's junior season (1954–55), he went on to average a career high 29.2 points and 24.4 rebounds in 26 games played. Look magazine named him an All-American at the end of the season.

Thieben continued his 20–20 average during his senior season in 1955–56. By this time, Hofstra had become classified as a Division I institution. In 26 games played, he averaged 26.9 points and 24.2 rebounds en route to a third consecutive All-Metropolitan area selection. He repeated as a Look magazine All-American, and he was also selected as the Haggerty Award winner. The Haggerty Award has been given annually since 1936 to the New York City metropolitan area's top male collegiate basketball player, and Thieben was the first Hofstra player to receive it.

In just 76 career games, Thieben scored 2,045 points and grabbed a school record 1,837 rebounds. While he still remains in the top 10 all-time for scoring at Hofstra, his rebounding mark is considered unbreakable. The second highest rebounder in program history is John Irving, who only amassed 1,186. Thieben still holds Hofstra records for career scoring (26.9) and rebounding (24.2) averages, as well as single game scoring (48) and rebounding records (43).

In 2008, Hofstra University officially retired his jersey (#93).

== Professional career ==
After a standout college career, Thieben was selected in the 1956 NBA draft by the Fort Wayne Pistons. Thieben's career spanned two seasons, and between the two he had his most success during his rookie campaign in 1956–57. Playing for the Fort Wayne Pistons, he appeared in 58 games while averaging 4.1 points and 3.6 rebounds per game. Fort Wayne finished in third place in the Western Division with a 34–38 overall record, but did advance to the first round of the playoffs.

After his rookie season, the franchise relocated to Detroit, Michigan and became the modern day Detroit Pistons. Thieben's statistics dropped to 3.7 points and 2.4 rebounds in 27 games played. The Pistons advanced further into the playoffs but still did not win the championship, and after two years Thieben's professional career was over.

== Later life and death ==
After his basketball career ended, Thieben went into teaching. He became the history teacher at Bay Shore High School in Bay Shore, New York for three years, and then in 1961 became the school's assistant principal for the next decade. In 1971, he became the principal at Rocky Point High School, a public school he worked at for 23 years until retirement in 1994.

In addition to his teaching and administrative roles at the high school level, Thieben also served as an adjunct professor of history and sociology at Suffolk Community College, Long Island University C.W. Post Campus and Long Island University, and as a professor of secondary education at St. Joseph's College in Patchogue.

Thieben died on April 15, 2021, at age 86.

== Career statistics ==
Legend
GP	Games played	GS	Games started	MPG	Minutes per game
FG%	Field goal percentage	3P%	3-point field goal percentage	FT%	Free throw percentage
RPG	Rebounds per game	APG	Assists per game	SPG	Steals per game
BPG	Blocks per game	PPG	Points per game	**Bold**	Career high

=== NBA ===
==== Regular season ====
Year	Team	GP	MPG	FG%	FT%	RPG	APG	PPG
1956–57	Fort Wayne	**58**	**10.9**	**.352**	**.655**	**3.6**	**.3**	**4.1**
1957–58	Detroit	27	9.0	.294	.593	2.4	**.3**	3.7
Career		85	10.3	.331	.640	3.2	.3	4.0

==== Playoffs ====
Year	Team	GP	MPG	FG%	FT%	RPG	APG	PPG
1956–57	Fort Wayne	2	14.0	.857	.333	3.0	1.5	7.0
