= Speedy Claxton =

American basketball coach & player (born 1978)

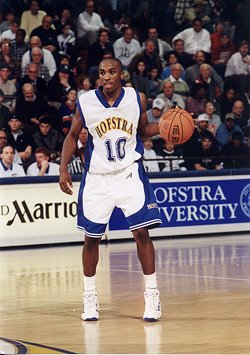
- Claxton playing for Hofstra in 1998

Hofstra Pride
- Title: Head coach
- League: Coastal Athletic Association

Personal information
- Born: May 8, 1978 (age 48) Hempstead, New York, U.S.
- Listed height: 5 ft 11 in (1.80 m)
- Listed weight: 170 lb (77 kg)

Career information
- High school: Christ the King (Queens, New York)
- College: Hofstra (1996–2000)
- NBA draft: 2000: 1st round, 20th overall pick
- Drafted by: Philadelphia 76ers
- Playing career: 2000–2009
- Position: Point guard
- Number: 12, 10, 5
- Coaching career: 2013–present

Career history

Playing
- 2000–2002: Philadelphia 76ers
- 2002–2003: San Antonio Spurs
- 2003–2005: Golden State Warriors
- 2005–2006: New Orleans/Oklahoma City Hornets (Note: During the 2005–06 and 2006–07 seasons, the team was known as the New Orleans/Oklahoma City Hornets during their temporary relocation to Oklahoma City due to Hurricane Katrina.)
- 2006–2009: Atlanta Hawks

Coaching
- 2013–2021: Hofstra (assistant)
- 2021–present: Hofstra

Career highlights
- As player: NBA champion (2003); 2× America East Player of the Year (1998, 2000); 3× First-team All-AEC (1998–2000); Third-team All-AEC (1997); America East tournament MVP (2000); Haggerty Award (2000); No. 10 retired by Hofstra Pride; As coach: CAA regular season champion (2023); CAA tournament champion (2026); CAA Coach of the Year (2023)

Career NBA statistics
- Points: 3,096 (9.3 ppg)
- Assists: 1,441 (4.3 apg)
- Steals: 503 (1.5 spg)
- Stats at NBA.com
- Stats at Basketball Reference

Craig Elliott "Speedy" Claxton (born May 8, 1978) is an American former professional basketball player and the current head coach of the Hofstra University men's basketball team. Claxton won an NBA championship in 2003 as a member of the San Antonio Spurs. In 2013, he was named as a special assistant to the head coach for the Hofstra University men's basketball program, before being hired as head coach in 2021.

== College ==
Prior to his NBA career, Claxton played at Hofstra University under future Villanova University coach Jay Wright. At Hofstra, Claxton led the Flying Dutchmen to the America East Championship, where they defeated the University of Delaware in the championship game at Hofstra Arena. The team was defeated in the first round of the 2000 NCAA tournament by an Oklahoma State team led by Desmond Mason, Claxton's future NBA teammate with the New Orleans Hornets.

Claxton donated money to help build the 5,000-seat arena in which the Hofstra team plays, and his number 10 was retired by Hofstra on January 31, 2009. Claxton was inducted into the Hofstra Hall of Fame on January 29, 2011.

== NBA career ==
Claxton was selected by the Philadelphia 76ers with the 20th overall pick of the 2000 NBA draft. His rookie-scale contract was worth four years and $4.68 million; he opted out of the fourth year to become a free agent.

Claxton missed his entire rookie season due to a knee injury suffered during the preseason. In 2002, Claxton was traded to the San Antonio Spurs for Mark Bryant, Randy Holcomb, and John Salmons, where he played on the Spurs' 2003 championship team as the backup to starting point guard Tony Parker.

In 2003, Claxton was signed by the Golden State Warriors to a three-year contract worth $10 million.

On February 24, 2005, Claxton and Dale Davis were traded from the Warriors to the New Orleans Hornets for Baron Davis.

On July 12, 2006, Claxton signed a contract worth approximately $25 million over four years with the Atlanta Hawks. Claxton only played 44 games with the Hawks, as he was injured every year after he signed with the team. During the 2006–07 season, he averaged 5.3 points and 4.4 assists per game.

On June 25, 2009, Claxton and Acie Law were traded to the Golden State Warriors for Jamal Crawford. Claxton never reported to the Warriors and was waived by Golden State on February 6, 2010, without appearing in a game for them.

== Post-playing career ==
Claxton served as a college scout with the Golden State Warriors before joining the Hofstra University men's basketball staff in 2013. On April 7, 2021, he was hired as head coach at Hofstra.

For the 2022–23 season, Claxton led the Pride to the CAA regular season title and was named CAA Coach of the Year.

== Personal life ==
Claxton's parents are from Antigua and Barbuda. His sister, Lisa, played for the St. John's Red Storm women's basketball team. His brother Michael (M. Buckets) played college basketball for the Villanova Wildcats. Claxton has two daughters, Aniya and London, with ex-wife Meeka. The couple announced their divorce in July 2014.

== Career statistics ==
Legend
| GP | Games played | GS | Games started | MPG | Minutes per game |
| FG% | Field goal percentage | 3P% | 3-point field goal percentage | FT% | Free throw percentage |
| RPG | Rebounds per game | APG | Assists per game | SPG | Steals per game |
| BPG | Blocks per game | PPG | Points per game | **Bold** | Career high |
| † | Won an NBA championship |

=== College ===
| Year | Team | GP | GS | MPG | FG% | 3P% | FT% | RPG | APG | SPG | BPG | PPG |
|---|---|---|---|---|---|---|---|---|---|---|---|---|
| 1996–97 | Hofstra | 27 | – | 33.9 | .432 | .158 | .706 | 4.6 | 3.4 | 1.9 | .1 | 15.0 |
| 1997–98 | Hofstra | **31** | – | 34.9 | **.485** | .182 | .730 | 4.6 | **7.2** | 2.2 | .3 | 16.3 |
| 1998–99 | Hofstra | 30 | 28 | 32.3 | .482 | .316 | **.801** | 4.4 | 5.3 | 2.3 | **.5** | 13.3 |
| 1999–2000 | Hofstra | **31** | **31** | **35.1** | .470 | **.381** | .764 | **5.4** | 6.0 | **3.3** | .2 | **22.8** |
| Career | | 119 | 59 | 34.1 | .468 | .322 | .748 | 4.8 | 5.5 | 2.4 | .3 | 16.9 |

=== NBA ===
==== Regular season ====
| Year | Team | GP | GS | MPG | FG% | 3P% | FT% | RPG | APG | SPG | BPG | PPG |
|---|---|---|---|---|---|---|---|---|---|---|---|---|
| 2001–02 | Philadelphia | 67 | 18 | 22.8 | .400 | .121 | **.838** | 2.4 | 3.0 | 1.4 | .1 | 7.2 |
| 2002–03† | San Antonio | 30 | 0 | 15.7 | **.462** | .000 | .684 | 1.9 | 2.5 | .7 | **.2** | 5.8 |
| 2003–04 | Golden State | 60 | 29 | 26.6 | .427 | .182 | .813 | 2.6 | 4.5 | 1.6 | **.2** | 10.6 |
| 2004–05 | Golden State | 46 | **44** | **32.6** | .431 | .192 | .761 | **3.3** | **6.2** | **1.9** | .1 | **13.1** |
| 2004–05 | New Orleans | 16 | 3 | 22.8 | .373 | .111 | .610 | 1.9 | 5.5 | 1.4 | .1 | 6.8 |
| 2005–06 | New Orleans/Oklahoma City | **71** | 3 | 28.4 | .413 | **.270** | .769 | 2.7 | 4.8 | 1.5 | .1 | 12.3 |
| 2006–07 | Atlanta | 42 | 31 | 25.1 | .327 | .214 | .550 | 1.9 | 4.4 | 1.7 | .1 | 5.3 |
| 2008–09 | Atlanta | 2 | 0 | 7.5 | .286 | .000 | .500 | .0 | 1.5 | .0 | .0 | 2.5 |
| Career | | 334 | 128 | 25.6 | .409 | .193 | .762 | 2.5 | 4.3 | 1.5 | .1 | 9.3 |

==== Playoffs ====
| Year | Team | GP | GS | MPG | FG% | 3P% | FT% | RPG | APG | SPG | BPG | PPG |
|---|---|---|---|---|---|---|---|---|---|---|---|---|
| 2002 | Philadelphia | 5 | 0 | 9.8 | .333 | .000 | .667 | .2 | **2.8** | **1.0** | .0 | 2.4 |
| 2003† | San Antonio | **24** | 0 | **13.6** | **.438** | .000 | **.750** | **1.9** | 1.9 | .7 | **.2** | **5.2** |
| 2009 | Atlanta | 1 | 0 | 3.0 | .000 | .000 | .000 | .0 | .0 | .0 | .0 | .0 |
| Career | | 30 | 0 | 12.6 | .427 | .000 | .740 | 1.5 | 2.0 | .7 | .2 | 4.6 |

== Head coaching record ==
=== College ===
Record table
| Season | Team | Overall | Conference | Standing | Postseason |
|---|---|---|---|---|---|
Hofstra Pride (Colonial Athletic Association) (2021–2023)
| 2021–22 | Hofstra | 21–11 | 13–5 | 3rd | |
| 2022–23 | Hofstra | 25–10 | 16–2 | T–1st | NIT Second Round |
Hofstra Pride (Coastal Athletic Association) (2023–present)
| 2023–24 | Hofstra | 20–13 | 12–6 | T–3rd | |
| 2024–25 | Hofstra | 15–18 | 6–12 | 11th | |
| 2025–26 | Hofstra | 24–11 | 12–6 | 3rd | NCAA Division I Round of 64 |
| 2026–27 | Hofstra | 2–3 | 0–0 | | |
| Hofstra: | | 107–66 (.618) | 59–31 (.656) | | |
| Total: | | 107–66 (.618) | | | |
National champion Postseason invitational champion Conference regular season champion Conference regular season and conference tournament champion Division regular season champion Division regular season and conference tournament champion Conference tournament champion
