= Hofstra Pride men's basketball =

Basketball team of Hofstra University

2026–27 Hofstra Pride men's basketball team
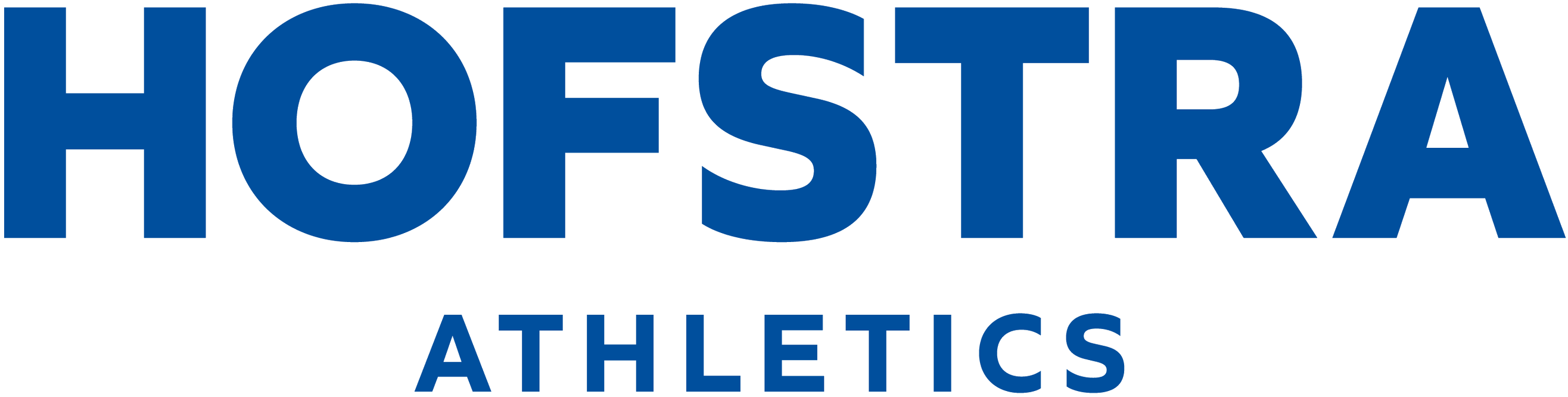
- University: Hofstra University
- Head coach: Speedy Claxton (5th season)
- Location: Hempstead, New York
- Arena: David S. Mack Sports and Exhibition Complex (capacity: 5,142)
- Conference: Coastal Athletic Association
- Nickname: Pride
- Colors: Blue, white, and gold
- Student section: The Lion’s Den

NCAA Division I tournament Elite Eight
- 1964*
Other NCAA Division I tournament results
Sweet Sixteen	1959*, 1963*, 1964*
Appearances	1959*, 1962*, 1963*, 1964*, 1976, 1977, 2000, 2001, 2026

Conference tournament champions
- East Coast: 1976, 1977, 1994; America East: 2000, 2001; CAA: 2020, 2026

Conference regular-season champions
- 1977, 1983, 1990, 1992, 2000, 2001, 2016, 2019, 2020, 2023

Uniforms
Home	Away
- * at Division II level

The Hofstra Pride men's basketball team, known until 2000 as the Hofstra Flying Dutchmen, is the basketball team that represents Hofstra University in Hempstead, New York, United States. Hofstra played its first game in 1936, and currently competes in the Coastal Athletic Association. Hofstra has appeared five times in the NCAA Division I men's basketball tournament, most recently in 2026.

== Arenas ==
The Hofstra Pride play their games at the David S. Mack Sports and Exhibition Complex. They have played many games at Madison Square Garden, winning the Holiday Festival in 1998, 1999, and 2006. Hofstra is 10–9 all-time at the Garden.

Hofstra has also played various games at Barclays Center and the Nassau Coliseum throughout its history.

== Coaching History ==
No.	Tenure	Coach	Years	Record	Pct.
1	1965–1972	Paul Lynner	7	93–82	.531
2	1972–1979	Roger Gaeckler	7	84–102	.452
3	1979–1980	Joe Harrington	1	14–14	.500
4	1980–1988	Dirk Berg	8	102–122	.455
5	1988–1994	Butch van Breda Kolff	6	79–91	.465
6	1994–2001	Jay Wright	7	122–85	.589
7	2001–2010	Tom Pecora^	9	155–126	.552
8	2010–2013	Mo Cassara	3	38–59	.392
9	2013–2021	Joe Mihalich	8	154–102	.602
10	2021–present	Speedy Claxton*^	5	105–62	.629
Totals		10 coaches	62 seasons	961–852	.530
Records updated through end of 2023–24 season Source; *Alum^Promoted from assistant to head coach

== Pride in the NBA ==
6 former Hofstra Pride players have played at least one game in the NBA.

Name	Draft Year	Draft Team
Speedy Claxton	2000	Philadelphia 76ers
Charles Jenkins	2011	Golden State Warriors
Rich Laurel	1977	Portland Trail Blazers
Norm Richardson	2001	Undrafted
Bill Thieben	1956	Fort Wayne Pistons
Justin Wright-Foreman	2019	Utah Jazz

== Pride in international leagues ==
- Eli Pemberton - Polish Basketball League

== Team records ==
=== Longest win streaks ===
	Years(s)	Streak
1	1959–60/1960–61	23
2	2000–01	18
3	2018–19	16
4	1961–62	14
5	1955–56	12

Source: Hofstra Record Book

=== Notable victories ===
Opponent	Year	Score
vs. George Mason (#25)	2006	77–66
at UCLA	2019	88–78
at Richmond (#23)	2020	76–71
at Arkansas (#24)	2021	89–81
at Rutgers	2023	88–86 ^{OT}

=== Single-game records ===
- Most points (game): 118 vs. Wagner (1971–72)
- Most 3-pointers (game): 20 vs. James Madison (2019–20)

=== Single-season records ===
- Most points (season): 2,919 in 2018–19
- Most 3-pointers (season): 308 in 2018–19

== Rivalries ==
Besides in-conference rivalries, Hofstra has a local rivalry with SUNY Stony Brook. Hofstra and Stony Brook are the only two NCAA Division I programs on Long Island outside of New York City (there are two universities with Division I programs in the New York City portion of Long Island: LIU in Brooklyn and St. John's in Queens). This rivalry is often referred to as the Battle of Long Island, in reference to the historical Battle of Long Island in 1776. Hofstra leads the rivalry 20–4 all time.

== Postseason results ==
=== NCAA Division I tournament results ===
The Pride have appeared in the NCAA Division I men's basketball tournament five times. Their combined record is 0–5.

The team earned an automatic berth to the 2020 NCAA tournament by winning the CAA conference tournament, but that year's NCAA tournament was ultimately canceled due to the COVID-19 pandemic.

Year	Round	Opponent	Result
1976	Regional Quarterfinals	Connecticut	L 78–80^{OT}
1977	Regional Quarterfinals	Notre Dame	L 83–90
2000	First round	Oklahoma State	L 66–86
2001	First round	UCLA	L 48–61
2026	First Round	Alabama	L 70–90

=== NCAA Division II tournament results ===
The Pride have appeared in the NCAA Division II men's basketball tournament three times. Their combined record is 5–4.

Year	Round	Opponent	Result
1959	Regional semifinals Regional Finals	Wesleyan (CT); American	W 67–48; L 65–66
1962	Regional semifinals Regional Finals	C.W. Post; Mount St. Mary's	W 56–55; L 54–66
1963	Regional semifinals Regional Finals	Philadelphia Textile; Mount St. Mary's	L 50–55; W 78–71
1964	Regional semifinals Regional Finals; Elite Eight	Catholic; Elizabethtown; Akron	W 92–91 ^{2OT} W 74–61; L 58–77

=== NIT results ===
The Pride have appeared in the National Invitation Tournament (NIT) seven times. Their combined record is 3–7.

Year	Round	Opponent	Result
1999	First round	Rutgers	L 45–58
2005	Opening round	Saint Joseph's	L 44–53
2006	First round Second round Quarterfinals	Nebraska; Saint Joseph's; Old Dominion	W 73–62; W 77–75; L 51–61
2007	First round	DePaul	L 71–83
2016	First round	George Washington	L 80–82
2019	First round	NC State	L 78–84
2023	First round Second round	Rutgers; Cincinnati	W 88–86^{OT} L 65–79

=== CBI results ===
The Pride have appeared in the College Basketball Invitational (CBI) three times. Their combined record is 0–3.

Year	Round	Opponent	Result
2010	First round	IUPUI	L 60–74
2011	First round	Evansville	L 70–77
2015	First round	Vermont	L 81–85

== Players ==
=== Retired numbers ===
Hofstra has retired five numbers in program history. In 2011, Charles Jenkins became the first to have his retired while still active.

Hofstra Pride retired numbers
No.	Player	Years
10	Speedy Claxton	1996–2000
13	Steve Nisenson	1962–1965
21	Rich Laurel	1973–1977
22	Charles Jenkins	2007–2011
93	Bill Thieben	1953–1956
