= 2014–15 Colonial Athletic Association men's basketball season =

- League: NCAA Division I
- Sport: Basketball
- Duration: November, 2014 – March, 2015
- Teams: 10

Regular Season
- Co-champions: William & Mary, UNC Wilmington, Northeastern, & James Madison
- Runners-up: Hofstra
- Season MVP: Marcus Thornton (William & Mary)
- Top scorer: Damion Lee (Drexel)

Tournament
- Champions: Northeastern
- Runners-up: William & Mary
- Finals MVP: Quincy Ford (Northeastern)

CAA men's basketball seasons
- ← 2013–14 2015–16 →

2014–15 CAA men's basketball standings
	Conf.				Overall
Team	W		L	PCT	W		L	PCT
William & Mary	12	–	6	.667	20	–	13	.606
UNC Wilmington	12	–	6	.667	18	–	14	.563
Northeastern †	12	–	6	.667	23	–	12	.657
James Madison	12	–	6	.667	19	–	14	.576
Hofstra	10	–	8	.556	20	–	14	.588
Delaware	9	–	9	.500	10	–	20	.333
Drexel	9	–	9	.500	11	–	19	.367
Elon	6	–	12	.333	15	–	18	.455
Towson	5	–	13	.278	12	–	20	.375
College of Charleston	3	–	15	.167	9	–	24	.273
† 2015 CAA tournament winner Rankings from AP poll

The 2014–15 CAA men's basketball season marked the 30th season of Colonial Athletic Association basketball, taking place between November 2014 and March 2015. Practices commenced in October 2014, and the season ended with the 2015 CAA men's basketball tournament.

This was the first CAA season for Elon, which had spent the previous 11 seasons in the Southern Conference.

== Preseason ==
=== Coaching changes ===
- After 3 consecutive 20-loss seasons and a 42-82 record in four seasons, UNCW head coach Buzz Peterson was fired and replaced by former Louisville assistant coach Kevin Keatts.
- College of Charleston head coach Doug Wojcik was fired on August 5, 2014 amid allegations of verbal abuse toward players and assistant coaches. He was replaced by former Clemson assistant coach Earl Grant.

=== Preseason poll ===
Rank	Team
1	Northeastern
2	William & Mary
3	Hofstra
4	Drexel
5	James Madison
6	College of Charleston
7	Towson
8	Delaware
9	UNC Wilmington
10	Elon

=== Preseason All-Conference Teams ===
Award	Recipients
First Team	Scott Eatherton (Northeastern) Juan'ya Green (Hofstra); Damion Lee (Drexel); Andre Nation (James Madison); Marcus Thornton (William & Mary)
Second Team	Adjehi Baru (College of Charleston) Quincy Ford (Northeastern); Dion Nesmith (Hofstra); Omar Prewitt (William & Mary); Cedrick Williams (UNCW)
Honorable Mention	Tavon Allen (Drexel) Kyle Anderson (Delaware); Ron Curry (James Madison); David Walker (Northeastern)

Colonial Athletic Association Preseason Player of the Year: Marcus Thornton, William & Mary

== Regular season ==
=== Head coaches ===
- Earl Grant, Charleston
- Monté Ross, Delaware
- Bruiser Flint, Drexel
- Matt Matheny, Elon
- Joe Mihalich, Hofstra
- Matt Brady, James Madison
- Bill Coen, Northeastern
- Pat Skerry, Towson
- Kevin Keatts, UNC Wilmington
- Tony Shaver, William & Mary

=== Rankings ===
Legend
Increase in ranking
Decrease in ranking
Not ranked previous week

		Pre	Wk 2	Wk 3	Wk 4	Wk 5	Wk 6	Wk 7	Wk 8	Wk 9	Wk 10	Wk 11	Wk 12	Wk 13	Wk 14	Wk 15	Wk 16	Wk 17	Wk 18	Wk 19	Final
College of Charleston	AP																				
College of Charleston	C																				
Delaware	AP																				
Delaware	C																				
Drexel	AP																				
Drexel	C																				
Elon	AP																				
Elon	C																				
Hofstra	AP									RV	RV	NR									
Hofstra	C																				
James Madison	AP																				
James Madison	C																				
Northeastern	AP			RV	NR																
Northeastern	C																				
Towson	AP																				
Towson	C																				
UNC Wilmington	AP																				
UNC Wilmington	C																				
William & Mary	AP																				
William & Mary	C																				

== Postseason ==
=== Colonial Athletic Association tournament ===
- March 6–9, 2015: Colonial Athletic Association Men's Basketball Tournament, Royal Farms Arena, Baltimore, Maryland

Northeastern defeated William & Mary, 72–61, in the finals of the 2015 CAA men's basketball tournament to win the conference, and earn an automatic bid to the 2015 NCAA Men's Division I Basketball Tournament.

=== NCAA tournament ===
The CAA has one bid to the 2014 NCAA Men's Division I Basketball Tournament, that being the automatic bid of Northeastern by winning the conference tournament.

Seed	Region	School	First Four	Round of 64	Round of 32	Sweet 16	Elite Eight	Final Four	Championship
14	Midwest	Northeastern	Bye	Eliminated by Notre Dame 65–69					
Bids		W-L (%):	0–0 –	0–1 .000	0–0 –	0–0 –	0–0 –	0–0 –	TOTAL: 0–1 .000

=== National Invitation tournament ===
The CAA has one bid to the 2015 National Invitation Tournament, that being the automatic bid of William & Mary by winning the conference's regular season championship.

Seed	School	First round	Second round	Quarterfinals	Semifinals	Championship
7	William & Mary	Eliminated by Tulsa 67–70				
Bids	W-L (%):	0–1 .000	0–0 –	0–0 –	0–0 –	TOTAL: 0–1 .000

=== College Basketball Invitational ===
Hofstra was invited to play in the 2015 College Basketball Invitational.

School	First round	Second round	Quarterfinals	Semifinals	Championship
Hofstra	Eliminated by Vermont 81–85				
W-L (%):	0–1 .000	0–0 –	0–0 –	0–0 –	TOTAL: 0–1 .000

=== CollegeInsider.com Postseason tournament ===
James Madison and UNC Wilmington were both invited to play in the 2015 CollegeInsider.com Postseason Tournament

School	First round	Second round	Quarterfinals	Semifinals	Championship
James Madison	Eliminated by USC Upstate 72–73				
UNC Wilmington	Eliminated by Sam Houston State 71–87				
W-L (%):	0–2 .000	0–0 –	0–0 –	0–0 –	TOTAL: 0–2 .000

== Awards and honors ==
=== Regular season ===
==== CAA Player-of-the-Week ====
- Nov. 17 – Brian Bernardi, Hofstra and David Walker, Northeastern
- Nov. 24 – Scott Eatherton, Northeastern
- Dec. 1 – Ameen Tanksley, Hofstra and Marcus Thornton, William & Mary
- Dec. 8 – Ameen Tanksley, Hofstra (2)
- Dec. 15 – Luke Eddy, Elon
- Dec. 22 – Scott Eatherton, Northeastern (2)
- Dec. 29 – Juan'ya Green, Hofstra
- Jan. 5 – T. J. Williams, Northeastern and Elijah Bryant, Elon
- Jan. 12 – Freddie Jackson, UNCW and Terry Tarpey, William & Mary
- Jan. 19 – Addison Spruill, UNCW
- Jan. 26 – Damion Lee, Drexel and Ron Curry, James Madison
- Feb. 2 – Damion Lee, Drexel (2)
- Feb. 9 – Ron Curry, James Madison (2)
- Feb. 16 – Scott Eatherton, Northeastern (3)
- Feb. 23 – David Walker, Northeastern (2)
- Mar. 2 – Ron Curry, James Madison (3)

==== CAA Rookie-of-the-Week ====
- Nov. 17 – Donovan Gilmore, College of Charleston
- Nov. 24 – Elijah Bryant, Elon
- Dec. 1 – Elijah Bryant, Elon (2)
- Dec. 8 – Kory Holden, Delaware
- Dec. 15 – Jordon Talley, UNCW
- Dec. 22 – Hari Hall, James Madison
- Dec. 29 – Elijah Bryant, Elon (3)
- Jan. 5 – Elijah Bryant, Elon (4)
- Jan. 12 – Kory Holden, Delaware (2)
- Jan. 19 – Tyshawn Myles, Drexel
- Jan. 26 – Kory Holden, Delaware (3)
- Feb. 2 – Mike Morsell, Towson
- Feb. 9 – Sammy Mojica, Drexel and Joey McLean, James Madison
- Feb. 16 – Jordon Talley, UNCW (2)
- Feb. 23 – Elijah Bryant, Elon (5) and Greg Malinowski, William & Mary
- Mar. 2 – Elijah Bryant, Elon (6) and Kory Holden, Delaware (4)

=== Postseason ===
==== CAA All-Conference Teams and Awards ====
Award	Recipients
Coach of the Year	Kevin Keatts (UNCW)
Player of the Year	Marcus Thornton (William & Mary)
Defensive Player of the Year	Terry Tarpey (William & Mary)
Rookie of the Year	Elijah Bryant (Elon)
Dean Ehlers Leadership Award	Caleb Donnelly (Northeastern); Tom Schalk (William & Mary)
First Team	Scott Eatherton (Northeastern); Juan'ya Green (Hofstra); Damion Lee (Drexel); Addison Spruill (UNCW); Marcus Thornton (William & Mary)
Second Team	Ron Curry (James Madison); Freddie Jackson (UNCW); Ameen Tanksley (Hofstra); Terry Tarpey (William & Mary); David Walker (Northeastern)
Third Team	Kyle Anderson (Delaware); Elijah Bryant (Elon); Yohanny Dalembert (James Madison); John Davis (Towson); Omar Prewitt (William & Mary)
All-Defensive Team	Terry Tarpey (William & Mary); Scott Eatherton (Northeastern); Yohanny Dalembert (James Madison); Freddie Jackson (UNCW); Damion Lee (Drexel)
All-Rookie Team	Elijah Bryant (Elon); Chivarsky Corbett (Delaware); Kory Holden (Delaware); Mike Morsell (Towson); Jordon Talley (UNCW)
All-Academic Team	Kyle Anderson (Delaware); Canyon Barry (Charleston); Dimitrije Cabarkapa (James Madison); Caleb Donnelly (Northeastern); Luke Eddy (Elon); Christian Hairston (Elon); Kevin Hickson (UNCW); Damion Lee (Drexel); Four McGlynn (Towson); Dion Nesmith (Hofstra); Timajh Parker-Rivera (Towson); Tom Schalk (William & Mary); Michael Schlotman (William & Mary); Rodney Williams (Drexel); Ryan Winters (Elon)
All-Tournament Team	Quincy Ford (Northeastern); Scott Eatherton (Northeastern); Juan'ya Green (Hofstra); Omar Prewitt (William & Mary); Marcus Thornton (William & Mary); David Walker (Northeastern)
Tournament MVP	Quincy Ford (Northeastern)
