= 2014–15 Northeastern Huskies men's basketball team =

American college basketball season

2014–15 Northeastern Huskies men's basketball

CAA regular season co–champions and tournament champions

NCAA tournament, round of 64
- Conference: Colonial Athletic Association
- Record: 23–12 (12–6 CAA)
- Head coach: Bill Coen (9th season)
- Assistant coaches: David McLaughlin; Chris Markwood; Brian McDonald
- Home arena: Matthews Arena

2014–15 CAA men's basketball standings
	Conf.				Overall
Team	W		L	PCT	W		L	PCT
William & Mary	12	–	6	.667	20	–	13	.606
UNC Wilmington	12	–	6	.667	18	–	14	.563
Northeastern †	12	–	6	.667	23	–	12	.657
James Madison	12	–	6	.667	19	–	14	.576
Hofstra	10	–	8	.556	20	–	14	.588
Delaware	9	–	9	.500	10	–	20	.333
Drexel	9	–	9	.500	11	–	19	.367
Elon	6	–	12	.333	15	–	18	.455
Towson	5	–	13	.278	12	–	20	.375
College of Charleston	3	–	15	.167	9	–	24	.273
† 2015 CAA tournament winner Rankings from AP poll

The 2014–15 Northeastern Huskies men's basketball team represented Northeastern University during the 2014–15 NCAA Division I men's basketball season. The Huskies, led by ninth year head coach Bill Coen, played their home games at Matthews Arena and were members of the Colonial Athletic Association. They finished the season 23–12, 12–6 in CAA play to finish in a four-way tie for the CAA regular season championship. They defeated Delaware, UNC Wilmington, and William & Mary to become champions of the CAA tournament. They received an automatic bid to the NCAA tournament, their first NCAA bid since 1991, where they lost in the second round to Notre Dame.

== Previous season ==
The Huskies finished the season 23–11, 12–6 in CAA play to finish in first place. They advanced to the finals of the CAA tournament where they defeated William & Mary to win the CAA title.

== Departures ==
Name	Number	Pos.	Height	Weight	Year	Hometown	Notes
Chris Avenant	1	G	6'4"	193	RS Senior	Sacramento, California	Graduated
Demetrius Pollard	2	G	6'2"	192	Senior	Virginia Beach, Virginia	Left Team
Marcos Benegas-Flores	11	G	6'1"	190	Junior	Boston	Transferred to UMass-Lowell
Derrico Peck	24	F	6'5"	204	Sophomore	Woodstock, Georgia	Transferred

== Recruiting ==
College recruiting information
Name	Hometown	School	Height	Weight	Commit date
Devon Begley; SG	Pearland, Texas	Pearland High School	6 ft 4 in (1.93 m)	190 lb (86 kg)	Sep 20, 2013
Devon Begley; SG	Recruit ratings: No ratings found				
Overall recruit ranking:
Note: In many cases, Scout, Rivals, 247Sports, On3, and ESPN may conflict in their listings of height and weight.; In these cases, the average was taken. ESPN grades are on a 100-point scale.; Sources: "2014 Team Ranking". Rivals.

== Roster ==
2014–15 Northeastern Huskies men's basketball team
Players
Coaches

Pos.	#	Name	Height	Weight	Year	Previous school	Hometown
G/F	3	Jimmy Marshall	6 ft 7 in (2.01 m)	195 lb (88 kg)	So	Douglas S. Freeman	Richmond, Virginia
G	4	David Walker	6 ft 6 in (1.98 m)	196 lb (89 kg)	Jr	Stow-Munroe Falls	Stow, Ohio
G	10	T. J. Williams	6 ft 3 in (1.91 m)	201 lb (91 kg)	So	Pflugerville	Pflugerville, Texas
G/F	12	Quincy Ford	6 ft 8 in (2.03 m)	225 lb (102 kg)	RS Jr	Gibbs	St. Petersburg, Florida
G	15	Caleb Donnelly	6 ft 1 in (1.85 m)	181 lb (82 kg)	Sr	Alvirne	Hudson, New Hampshire
G	20	Devon Begley	6 ft 4 in (1.93 m)	186 lb (84 kg)	Fr	Pearland	Pearland, Texas
G	22	C. J. Hill	6 ft 2 in (1.88 m)	184 lb (83 kg)	RS Fr	Westfield	Centreville, Virginia
G	33	Zach Stahl	6 ft 5 in (1.96 m)	215 lb (98 kg)	Jr	Hopkins	Chanhassen, Minnesota
F	34	Kwesi Abakah	6 ft 8 in (2.03 m)	212 lb (96 kg)	RS So	North Gwinnett	Suwanee, Georgia
F	43	Scott Eatherton	6 ft 8 in (2.03 m)	219 lb (99 kg)	RS Sr	Saint Francis (PA); Hershey	Hershey, Pennsylvania
F	44	Reggie Spencer	6 ft 7 in (2.01 m)	234 lb (106 kg)	Sr	Hillcrest	Tuscaloosa, Alabama

Head coach

- Bill Coen (Hamilton College)

Assistant coach(es)

- David McLaughlin (Colby College)
- Chris Markwood (Maine)
- Brian McDonald (Northeastern)

Legend

- (C) Team captain
- (S) Suspended
- (I) Ineligible
- (W) Walk-on
- Injured
- Current redshirt

Roster

== Schedule ==
Date time, TV	Rank^{#}	Opponent^{#}	Result	Record	Site (attendance) city, state
Non-conference regular season
11/16/2014*; 12:30 pm, NESN		vs. Boston University; Coaches vs. Cancer Boston Tip-Off	W 71–65	1–0	TD Garden (5,112); Boston
11/18/2014*; 7:00 pm, ESPN3		at Florida State; CBE Hall of Fame Classic	W 76–73	2–0	Donald L. Tucker Center (5,587); Tallahassee, Florida
11/22/2014*; 8:00 pm, ESPN3		vs. Navy; CBE Hall of Fame Classic	W 68–44	3–0	Mohegan Sun Arena (1,121); Uncasville, Connecticut
11/23/2014*; 8:00 pm, ESPN3		vs. Manhattan; CBE Hall of Fame Classic	W 65–51	4–0	Mohegan Sun Arena (717); Uncasville, Connecticut
11/26/2014*; 2:00 pm		at Massachusetts; CBE Hall of Fame Classic	L 54–79	4–1	Mullins Center (2,918); Amherst, Massachusetts
11/29/2014*; 3:00 pm		Fairfield	W 57–48	5–1	Cabot Center (1,125); Boston
12/03/2014*; 7:00 pm, NESN		at Harvard	L 42–60	5–2	Lavietes Pavilion (1,553); Cambridge, Massachusetts
12/06/2014*; 4:00 pm		Western Michigan	W 81–69	6–2	Matthews Arena (1,116); Boston
12/17/2014*; 10:00 pm		vs. Cal Poly; Cable Car Classic	L 58–60	6–3	Leavey Center (965); Santa Clara, California
12/20/2014*; 5:00 pm		at Santa Clara; Cable Car Classic	W 78–72	7–3	Leavey Center (1,168); Santa Clara, California
12/22/2014*; 9:00 pm		at Saint Mary's	L 68–72 ^{OT}	7–4	McKeon Pavilion (2,621); Moraga, California
12/31/2014*; 4:00 pm		at Richmond	W 58–57	8–4	Robins Center (4,179); Richmond, Virginia
CAA regular season
01/03/2015; 2:00 pm		at Delaware	W 72–53	9–4 (1–0)	Bob Carpenter Center (2,202); Newark, Delaware
01/05/2015; 7:00 pm		UNC Wilmington	L 68–75	9–5 (1–1)	Matthews Arena (573); Boston
01/08/2015; 7:00 pm		at James Madison	W 65–59	10–5 (2–1)	JMU Convocation Center (2,589); Harrisonburg, Virginia
01/10/2015; 2:00 pm, CSN		at Towson	W 52–49	11–5 (3–1)	SECU Arena (1,507); Towson, Maryland
01/14/2015; 7:00 pm		Hofstra	W 91–83	12–5 (4–1)	Matthews Arena (1,493); Boston
01/17/2015; 7:00 pm		College of Charleston	W 69–67	13–5 (5–1)	Matthews Arena (1,624); Boston
01/19/2015*; 2:00 pm		Detroit	L 69–81 ^{OT}	13–6	Matthews Arena (1,032); Boston
01/22/2015; 7:00 pm		James Madison	W 82–59	14–6 (6–1)	Matthews Arena (1,680); Boston
01/24/2015; 2:00 pm, NBCSN		at William & Mary	L 62–78	14–7 (6–2)	Kaplan Arena (5,053); Williamsburg, Virginia
01/28/2015; 7:00 pm		at Drexel	L 60–65	14–8 (6–3)	Daskalakis Athletic Center (1,011); Philadelphia
01/31/2015; 7:00 pm		Elon	W 80–61	15–8 (7–3)	Matthews Arena (1,171); Boston
02/04/2015; 7:00 pm		Towson	W 69–62	16–8 (8–3)	Matthews Arena (955); Boston
02/07/2015; 12:00 pm, CSN		Delaware	L 68–73	16–9 (8–4)	Matthews Arena (1,423); Boston
02/12/2015; 7:00 pm, NBCSN		at Hofstra	W 79–68	17–9 (9–4)	Mack Sports Complex (2,352); Hempstead, New York
02/14/2015; 8:00 pm, ASN		at UNC Wilmington	L 61–66	17–10 (9–5)	Trask Coliseum (4,619); Wilmington, North Carolina
02/18/2015; 7:00 pm		William & Mary	W 75–64	18–10 (10–5)	Matthews Arena (927); Boston,
02/21/2015; 4:00 pm, NBCSN		Drexel	W 83–73 ^{OT}	19–10 (11–5)	Matthews Arena (1,925); Boston,
02/26/2015; 7:00 pm		at Elon	L 65–72	19–11 (11–6)	Alumni Gym (1,016); Elon, North Carolina
02/28/2015; 8:00 pm		at College of Charleston	W 65–56	20–11 (12–6)	TD Arena (2,603); Charleston, South Carolina
CAA tournament
03/07/2015; 8:30 pm, CSN		vs. Delaware; Quarterfinals	W 67–64	21–11	Royal Farms Arena (3,016); Baltimore
03/08/2015; 8:30 pm, NBCSN		vs. UNC Wilmington; Semifinals	W 78–71	22–11	Royal Farms Arena (3,703); Baltimore
03/09/2015; 8:30 pm, NBCSN		vs. William & Mary; Championship game	W 72–61	23–11	Royal Farms Arena (5,721); Baltimore
NCAA tournament
03/18/2015*; 12:15 pm, CBS	(14 MW)	vs. (3 MW) No. 8 Notre Dame; Second round	L 65–69	23–12	Consol Energy Center (15,818); Pittsburgh
*Non-conference game. ^{#}Rankings from AP Poll. (#) Tournament seedings in parentheses. All times are in Eastern Time. (#) during NCAA Tournament is seed with Region MW=Midwest.
