= 2015 CAA men's basketball tournament =

- Tournament Logo
- Classification: Division I
- Season: 2014–15
- Teams: 10
- Site: Royal Farms Arena; Baltimore, Maryland
- Champions: Northeastern (1st title)
- Winning coach: Bill Coen (1st title)
- MVP: Quincy Ford (Northeastern)
- Attendance: 18,754
- Top scorer: Marcus Thornton (William & Mary) (74 points)
- Television: CAA.tv, CSN, NBCSN

2014–15 CAA men's basketball standings
| | Conf. | | | | Overall |
| Team | W | | L | PCT | W | | L | PCT |
|---|---|---|---|---|---|---|---|---|
| William & Mary | 12 | – | 6 | .667 | 20 | – | 13 | .606 |
| UNC Wilmington | 12 | – | 6 | .667 | 18 | – | 14 | .563 |
| Northeastern † | 12 | – | 6 | .667 | 23 | – | 12 | .657 |
| James Madison | 12 | – | 6 | .667 | 19 | – | 14 | .576 |
| Hofstra | 10 | – | 8 | .556 | 20 | – | 14 | .588 |
| Delaware | 9 | – | 9 | .500 | 10 | – | 20 | .333 |
| Drexel | 9 | – | 9 | .500 | 11 | – | 19 | .367 |
| Elon | 6 | – | 12 | .333 | 15 | – | 18 | .455 |
| Towson | 5 | – | 13 | .278 | 12 | – | 20 | .375 |
| College of Charleston | 3 | – | 15 | .167 | 9 | – | 24 | .273 |
† 2015 CAA tournament winner Rankings from AP poll

The 2015 Colonial Athletic Association men's basketball tournament was held March 6–9, 2015 at Royal Farms Arena in Baltimore, Maryland. The champion received an automatic bid to the 2015 NCAA tournament. The 2015 tournament featured 10 teams due to the addition of Elon to the CAA.

== Seeds ==
| Seed | School | Conference | Overall | Tiebreaker 1 | Tiebreaker 2 |
|---|---|---|---|---|---|
| 1 | William & Mary ‡† | 12–6 | 18–11 | 5–1 vs UNCW, NU, & JMU | |
| 2 | UNC Wilmington ‡† | 12–6 | 17–12 | 4–2 vs W&M, NU, & JMU | |
| 3 | Northeastern ‡† | 12–6 | 20–11 | 3–3 vs W&M, UNCW, & JMU | |
| 4 | James Madison ‡† | 12–6 | 19–12 | 0–6 vs W&M, UNCW, & NU | |
| 5 | Hofstra † | 10–8 | 19–12 | | |
| 6 | Delaware † | 9–9 | 10–19 | 1–1 vs Drexel | 4–4 vs W&M, UNCW, NU, & JMU |
| 7 | Drexel | 9–9 | 11–18 | 1–1 vs Delaware | 3–5 vs W&M, UNCW, NU, & JMU |
| 8 | Elon | 6–12 | 14–17 | | |
| 9 | Towson | 5–13 | 12–19 | | |
| 10 | College of Charleston | 3–15 | 8–23 | | |
‡ – CAA regular season champions. † – Received a bye in the conference tournament. Overall records are as of the end of the regular season.

== Schedule ==
| Session | Game | Time* | Matchup^{#} | Television |
First round – Friday March 6, 2015
| 1 | 1 | 6:00 PM | #9 Towson 69 vs #8 Elon 74 (OT) | CAA.tv |
| 1 | 2 | 8:30 PM | #10 College of Charleston 56 vs #7 Drexel 48 | CAA.tv |
Quarterfinals – Saturday March 7, 2015
| 2 | 3 | 12:00 PM | #8 Elon 59 vs #1 William & Mary 72 | Comcast SportsNet |
| 2 | 4 | 2:30 PM | #5 Hofstra 74 vs #4 James Madison 57 | Comcast SportsNet |
| 3 | 5 | 6:00 PM | #10 College of Charleston 53 vs #2 UNC Wilmington 79 | Comcast SportsNet |
| 3 | 6 | 8:30 PM | #6 Delaware 64 vs #3 Northeastern 67 | Comcast SportsNet |
Semifinals – Sunday March 8, 2015
| 4 | 7 | 2:30 PM | #5 Hofstra 91 vs #1 William & Mary 92 (2OT) | NBCSN |
| 4 | 8 | 5:00 PM | #3 Northeastern 78 vs #2 UNC Wilmington 71 | NBCSN |
Championship – Monday March 9, 2015
| 5 | 9 | 7:00 PM | #3 Northeastern 72 vs #1 William & Mary 61 | NBCSN |
*Game times in ET. #-Rankings denote tournament seed

== Bracket ==
First round Friday, March 6 CAA.tv
8 | Elon | 74*
9 | Towson | 69
7 | Drexel | 48
10 | College of Charleston | 56

Quarterfinals; Saturday, March 7 Comcast SportsNet
1 | William & Mary | 72
8 | Elon | 59
4 | James Madison | 57
5 | Hofstra | 74
2 | UNC Wilmington | 79
10 | College of Charleston | 53
3 | Northeastern | 67
6 | Delaware | 64

Semifinals; Sunday, March 8 NBCSN
1 | William & Mary | 92**
5 | Hofstra | 91
2 | UNC Wilmington | 71
3 | Northeastern | 78

Final; Monday, March 9 NBCSN
1 | William & Mary | 61
3 | Northeastern | 72

* Denotes overtime period.

== All-Tournament Team ==
- Quincy Ford, Northeastern (Most Outstanding Performer)
- Scott Eatherton, Northeastern
- Juan'ya Green, Hofstra
- Omar Prewitt, William & Mary
- Marcus Thornton, William & Mary
- David Walker, Northeastern

== Game summaries ==
=== First round ===
CAA.tv

March 6
6:00 pm

Recap

#9 Towson 69, #8 Elon 74 (OT)
Scoring by half: 32–33, 30–29 Overtime: 7–12
| Pts: M. Morsell – 18; Rebs: 2 with 8 Asts: 5 with 1 W. Foster – 2 Blks | Pts: E. Bryant – 21; Rebs: D. Thompson – 5 Asts: A. Hamilton – 7 T. Sabato – 3 Blks |

Royal Farms Arena
Baltimore, MD
Attendance: 2,552
Referees: T. Ebersole, J. Nichols, M. Dorn

CAA.tv

March 6
8:30 pm

Recap

#10 College of Charleston 56, #7 Drexel 48
Scoring by half: 24–29, 32–19
| Pts: C. Barry – 19; Rebs: T. O'Donohue – 14; Asts: J. Chealey – 3; 4 with 2 Stls | Pts: F. Wilson – 17; Rebs: R. Williams – 8 Asts: R. Williams – 2 R. London – 3 Stls |

Royal Farms Arena
Baltimore, MD
Attendance: 2,552
Referees: A. Marotta, M. Oblas, B. Testa

=== Quarterfinals ===
Comcast SportsNet

March 7
12:00 pm

Recap

#8 Elon 59, #1 William & Mary 72
Scoring by half: 26–36, 23–36
| Pts: E. Bryant – 15; Rebs: 2 with 5 Asts: A. Hamilton – 4; 2 with 2 Stls | Pts: M. Thornton – 17; Rebs: T. Tarpey – 9 Asts: T. Tarpey – 5 T. Tarpey – 3 Stls |

Royal Farms Arena
Baltimore, MD
Attendance: 3,762
Referees: A. Marotta, A. Maira, T. Attanasi

Comcast SportsNet

March 7
2:30 pm

Recap

#5 Hofstra 74, #4 James Madison 57
Scoring by half: 39–33, 35–24
| Pts: M. Kone – 18; Rebs: M. Kone – 11; Asts: J. Green – 8 A. Tanksley – 3 Stls | Pts: R. Curry – 18; Rebs: T. Vodanovich – 7 Asts: R. Curry – 4 J. McLean – 2 Stls |

Royal Farms Arena
Baltimore, MD
Attendance: 3,762
Referees: B. Testa, M. Oblas, D. Hopper

Comcast SportsNet

March 7
6:00 pm

Recap

#10 College of Charleston 53, #2 UNC Wilmington 79
Scoring by half: 25–36, 28–43
| Pts: J. Chealey – 12; Rebs: D. Gilmore – 11; Asts: A. Stiitt – 3 A. Baru – 2 Blks | Pts: F. Jackson – 19; Rebs: C. Williams – 13; Asts: C. Ponder – 4 C. Williams – 2 Blks |

Royal Farms Arena
Baltimore, MD
Attendance: 3,016
Referees: T. Ebersole, M. Curtin, K. Fogleman

Comcast SportsNet

March 7
8:30 pm

Recap

#6 Delaware 64, #3 Northeastern 67
Scoring by half: 31–35, 33–32
| Pts: K. Holden – 20; Rebs: 3 with 5 Asts: K. Holden – 5 C. Corbett – 3 Stls | Pts: D. Walker – 17; Rebs: Z. Stahl – 6 Asts: Z. Stahl – 5 Q. Ford – 3 Stls |

Royal Farms Arena
Baltimore, MD
Attendance: 3,016
Referees: J. Nichols, J. Gwynn, A. Franklin

=== Semifinals ===
NBCSN

March 8
2:30 pm

Recap

#5 Hofstra 91, #1 William & Mary 92 (OT)
Scoring by half: 32–35, 41–38 Overtime: 10–10, 8–9
| Pts: J. Green – 26; Rebs: R. Gustys – 9 Asts: J. Green – 7 J. Green – 4 Stls | Pts: M. Thornton – 37; Rebs: T. Tarpey – 10; Asts: 4 with 2 O. Prewitt – 1 Blk |

Royal Farms Arena
Baltimore, MD
Attendance: 3,703
Referees: J. Lindsey, T. Nestor, T. Comer

NBCSN

March 10
5:00 pm

Recap

#3 Northeastern 78, #2 UNC Wilmington 71
Scoring by half: 33–30, 45–41
| Pts: S. Eatherton – 21; Rebs: D. Walker – 8 Asts: D. Walker – 5 S. Eatherton – 3 Blks | Pts: J. Talley – 18; Rebs: C. Williams – 7 Asts: J. Talley – 4 F. Jackson – 2 Stls |

Royal Farms Arena
Baltimore, MD
Attendance: 3,703
Referees: B. Kersey, S. Hull, L. Andrakakos

=== Championship ===
NBCSN

March 9
7:00 pm

Recap

#3 Northeastern 72, #1 William & Mary 61
Scoring by half: 36–26, 36–35
| Pts: Ford – 22; Rebs: Stahl – 10; Asts: Stahl – 5 Eatherton – 12 Pts, 5 Reb | Pts: Thornton – 20; Rebs: Tarpey – 7 Asts: Sheldon – 6 Dixon – 15 Pts, 4 Reb |

Royal Farms Arena
Baltimore, MD
Attendance: 5,721
Referees: E. Corbett, T. Clougherty, J. Lindsay

== Team and tournament leaders ==
=== Team leaders ===
| Team | Points | | Rebounds | | Assists | | Blocks | | Steals | | Minutes | |
|---|---|---|---|---|---|---|---|---|---|---|---|---|
| College of Charleston | C. Barry | 28 | T. O'Donohue | 15 | J. Chealey | 4 | 2 Players | 2 | 2 Players | 3 | A. Stitt | 66 |
| Delaware | K. Holden | 20 | 3 Players | 5 | K. Holden | 5 | None | | C. Corbett | 3 | K. Holden | 37 |
| Drexel | F. Wilson | 17 | R. Williams | 8 | R. Williams | 2 | M. Bah | 2 | R. London | 3 | 2 Players | 40 |
| Elon | E. Bryant | 36 | A. Hamilton | 8 | A. Hamilton | 11 | T. Sabato | 4 | T. Samson | 3 | E. Bryant | 76 |
| Hofstra | J. Green | 29 | M. Kone | 17 | J. Green | 15 | 4 Players | 1 | A. Tanksley | 5 | J. Green | 88 |
| James Madison | R. Curry | 18 | T. Vodanovich | 7 | R. Curry | 4 | 2 Players | 1 | J. McLean | 2 | R. Curry | 39 |
| Northeastern | Q. Ford | 46 | Z. Stahl | 21 | 2 Players | 12 | 2 Players | 5 | 2 Players | 5 | D. Walker | 117 |
| Towson | M. Morsell | 18 | 2 Players | 8 | 5 Players | 1 | W. Foster | 2 | 3 Players | 1 | W. Foster | 36 |
| UNC Wilmington | C. Ponder | 28 | C. Williams | 20 | 2 Players | 7 | C. Williams | 3 | 4 Players | 2 | C. Ponder | 73 |
| William & Mary | M. Thornton | 74 | T. Tarpey | 26 | S. Sheldon | 11 | O. Prewitt | 2 | T. Tarpey | 7 | M. Thornton | 120 |
