= 2014–15 Hofstra Pride men's basketball team =

American college basketball season

2014–15 Hofstra Pride men's basketball

CBI, First round
- Conference: Colonial Athletic Association
- Record: 20–14 (10–8 CAA)
- Head coach: Joe Mihalich (2nd season)
- Assistant coaches: Mike Farrelly; Shane Nichols; Speedy Claxton; Colin Curtin
- Home arena: Mack Sports Complex

2014–15 CAA men's basketball standings
| | Conf. | | | | Overall |
| Team | W | | L | PCT | W | | L | PCT |
|---|---|---|---|---|---|---|---|---|
| William & Mary | 12 | – | 6 | .667 | 20 | – | 13 | .606 |
| UNC Wilmington | 12 | – | 6 | .667 | 18 | – | 14 | .563 |
| Northeastern † | 12 | – | 6 | .667 | 23 | – | 12 | .657 |
| James Madison | 12 | – | 6 | .667 | 19 | – | 14 | .576 |
| Hofstra | 10 | – | 8 | .556 | 20 | – | 14 | .588 |
| Delaware | 9 | – | 9 | .500 | 10 | – | 20 | .333 |
| Drexel | 9 | – | 9 | .500 | 11 | – | 19 | .367 |
| Elon | 6 | – | 12 | .333 | 15 | – | 18 | .455 |
| Towson | 5 | – | 13 | .278 | 12 | – | 20 | .375 |
| College of Charleston | 3 | – | 15 | .167 | 9 | – | 24 | .273 |
† 2015 CAA tournament winner Rankings from AP poll

The 2014–15 Hofstra Pride men's basketball team represented Hofstra University during the 2014–15 NCAA Division I men's basketball season. The Pride, led by second year head coach Joe Mihalich, played their home games at Mack Sports Complex and were members of the Colonial Athletic Association. They finished the season 20–14, 10–8 in CAA play to finish in fifth place. They advanced to the semifinals of the CAA tournament where they lost to William & Mary. They were invited to the College Basketball Invitational where they lost in the first round to Vermont.

== Previous season ==
The Pride finished the season 10–23, 5–11 in CAA play to finish in eighth place. They lost in the second round of the CAA tournament to Delaware, after winning the first-round game against UNC Wilmington.

== Off season ==
=== Departures ===
| Name | Number | Pos. | Height | Weight | Year | Hometown | Notes |
|---|---|---|---|---|---|---|---|
| Zeke Upshaw | 3 | G/F | 6'6" | 215 | Graduate (5th year senior) | Chicago | Graduated |
| Jordan Allen | 0 | F | 6'6" | 200 | Redshirt Sophomore | Bayshore, New York | Graduated, transferred to Sacred Heart |
| Darren Payen | 12 | F | 6'8" | 205 | Sophomore | Milford, Connecticut | Transferred to UVM |
| Dan Steinberg | 5 | F | 6'7" | 200 | Senior | Flemington, New Jersey | Graduated |
| Stephen Nwaukoni | 24 | F/C | 6'8" | 240 | Senior | Queens, New York | Graduated |
| Chris Jenkins | 4 | G/F | 6'4" | 215 | Freshman | Hillside, New Jersey | Transferred to NJIT |

=== Incoming transfers ===
College recruiting information
| Name | Hometown | School | Height | Weight | Commit date |
|---|---|---|---|---|---|
| Malik Nichols; SF | Queens, New York | South Plains College | 6 ft 6 in (1.98 m) | 210 lb (95 kg) | Jan 27, 2014 |
| Malik Nichols; SF | Recruit ratings: Scout: Rivals: 247Sports: ESPN: (83) | | | | |
| Ibrahim Djambo; PF | Bamako, Mali | Three Rivers Community College/Clemson | 6 ft 10 in (2.08 m) | 215 lb (98 kg) | Jul 20, 2014 |
| Ibrahim Djambo; PF | Recruit ratings: Scout: Rivals: 247Sports: (N/A) | | | | |
Overall recruit ranking:
Note: In many cases, Scout, Rivals, 247Sports, On3, and ESPN may conflict in their listings of height and weight.; In these cases, the average was taken. ESPN grades are on a 100-point scale.; Sources: "2014 Team Ranking". Rivals.

=== 2014 Recruiting Class ===
College recruiting information
| Name | Hometown | School | Height | Weight | Commit date |
|---|---|---|---|---|---|
| Andre Walker; F/C | Clarksburg, Maryland | The Bullis School | 6 ft 10 in (2.08 m) | 215 lb (98 kg) | Oct 5, 2013 |
| Andre Walker; F/C | Recruit ratings: Scout: Rivals: 247Sports: ESPN: (67) | | | | |
| Rokas Gustys; F | Kaunas, Lithuania | Oak Hill Academy | 6 ft 9 in (2.06 m) | 245 lb (111 kg) | May 6, 2014 |
| Rokas Gustys; F | Recruit ratings: Scout: Rivals: 247Sports: ESPN: (N/A) | | | | |
Overall recruit ranking:
Note: In many cases, Scout, Rivals, 247Sports, On3, and ESPN may conflict in their listings of height and weight.; In these cases, the average was taken. ESPN grades are on a 100-point scale.; Sources: "2014 Team Ranking". Rivals.

== Roster ==
2014–15 Hofstra Pride men's basketball team
Players
Coaches

| Pos. | # | Name | Height | Weight | Year | Hometown |
|---|---|---|---|---|---|---|
| G/F | 0 | Malik Nichols | 6 ft 6 in (1.98 m) | 210 lb (95 kg) | Jr | Queens, New York |
| G | 1 | Juan'ya Green | 6 ft 3 in (1.91 m) | 195 lb (88 kg) | RS Jr | Philadelphia |
| G/F | 2 | Ameen Tanksley | 6 ft 6 in (1.98 m) | 200 lb (91 kg) | RS Jr | Philadelphia |
| G | 3 | Daryl Fowlkes (W) | 6 ft 1 in (1.85 m) | 170 lb (77 kg) | So | Fort Washington, Maryland |
| F | 4 | Rokas Gustys | 6 ft 9 in (2.06 m) | 245 lb (111 kg) | Fr | Kaunas, Lithuania |
| G | 11 | Dion Nesmith | 6 ft 0 in (1.83 m) | 200 lb (91 kg) | RS Sr | Union, New Jersey |
| G | 14 | Brian Bernardi | 6 ft 2 in (1.88 m) | 180 lb (82 kg) | RS So | Staten Island, New York |
| G/F | 20 | Jamall Robinson | 6 ft 5 in (1.96 m) | 210 lb (95 kg) | So | Cheltenham, Maryland |
| G | 30 | Eliel Gonzalez | 6 ft 3 in (1.91 m) | 200 lb (91 kg) | RS Fr | Cayey, Puerto Rico |
| F/C | 31 | Moussa Kone | 6 ft 7 in (2.01 m) | 220 lb (100 kg) | Sr | Bronx, New York |
| F | 42 | Ibrahim Djambo (redshirt) | 6 ft 10 in (2.08 m) | 215 lb (98 kg) | RS Sr | Bamako, Mali |
| F/C | 44 | Andre Walker | 6 ft 10 in (2.08 m) | 215 lb (98 kg) | Fr | Clarksburg, Maryland |

Head coach

- Joe Mihalich (La Salle)

Assistant coach(es)

- Mike Farrelly (Saint Joseph's)
- Shane Nichols (Wofford)
- Speedy Claxton (Hofstra)
- Colin Curtin (Niagara)

Legend

- (C) Team captain
- (S) Suspended
- (I) Ineligible
- (W) Walk-on
- Injured
- Current redshirt

Roster

== Schedule ==
| Date time, TV | Opponent | Result | Record | High points | High rebounds | High assists | Site (attendance) city, state |
Non-conference regular season
| November 14, 2014*; 8:00 pm | Jacksonville; Global Sports Shootout | W 94–61 | 1–0 | 22 – Bernardi | 11 – Walker | 9 – Green | Mack Sports Complex (2,208); Hempstead, New York |
| November 17, 2014*; 7:00 pm, ESPN3 | at NC State; Global Sports Shootout | L 64–76 | 1–1 | 19 – Green | 12 – Gustys | 4 – Green | PNC Arena (14,634); Raleigh, North Carolina |
| November 21, 2014*; 7:00 pm | Stony Brook | W 66–65 | 2–1 | 26 – Warney | 14 – Warney | 4 – Tied | Mack Sports Complex (2,726); Hempstead, New York |
| November 23, 2014*; 4:30 pm | Wagner | W 93–71 | 3–1 | 24 – Green | 10 – Walker | 11 – Green | Mack Sports Complex (1,392); Hempstead, New York |
| November 25, 2014*; 7:00 pm, ESPN3 | at South Florida; Global Sports Shootout | L 70–71 | 3–2 | 20 – Tanksley | 12 – Gustys | 7 – Green | USF Sun Dome (3,228); Tampa, Florida |
| November 28, 2014*; 8:00 pm | at Jackson State; Global Sports Shootout | W 86–56 | 4–2 | 26 – Bernardi | 7 – Tied | 6 – Green | Williams Assembly Center (278); Jackson, Mississippi |
| December 2, 2014*; 7:00 pm | Norfolk State | W 88–74 | 5–2 | 30 – Tanksley | 5 – Tied | 8 – Green | Mack Sports Complex (846); Hempstead, New York |
| December 7, 2014*; 2:00 pm | at Appalachian State | W 68–51 | 6–2 | 17 – Green | 10 – Nichols | 3 – Tied | Holmes Center (1,254); Boone, North Carolina |
| December 10, 2014*; 7:30 pm | at Coppin State | W 105–64 | 7–2 | 23 – Tanksley | 15 – Nichols | 7 – Green | Physical Education Complex (618); Baltimore |
| December 20, 2014*; 7:00 pm | at Columbia | L 77–82 | 7–3 | 19 – Green | 9 – Nichols | 4 – Green | Levien Gymnasium (1,361); New York City |
| December 23, 2014*; 4:00 pm | La Salle | L 74–83 | 7–4 | 23 – Tanksley | 9 – Nichols | 11 – Green | Mack Sports Complex (1,184); Hempstead, New York |
| December 28, 2014*; 2:30 pm | vs. LIU Brooklyn; Brooklyn Hoops Winter Festival | W 88–62 | 8–4 | 32 – Tanksley | 10 – Green | 10 – Green | Barclays Center (6,032); Brooklyn, New York |
| December 31, 2014*; 4:00 pm | at Central Connecticut | W 84–56 | 9–4 | 19 – Green | 7 – Tanksley | 5 – Green | William H. Detrick Gymnasium (917); New Britain, Connecticut |
Conference Regular Season
| January 3, 2015; 2:00 pm | at UNC Wilmington | W 68–56 | 10–4 (1–0) | 15 – Tied | 10 – Gustys | 3 – Tied | Trask Coliseum (3,233); Wilmington, North Carolina |
| January 5, 2015; 7:00 pm | Delaware | W 71–58 | 11–4 (2–0) | 16 – Green | 16 – Gustys | 6 – Nesmith | Mack Sports Complex (1,341); Hempstead, New York |
| January 8, 2015; 7:30 pm | at College of Charleston | W 71–66 | 12–4 (3–0) | 26 – Green | 5 – Tied | 4 – Tied | TD Arena (1,805); Charleston, South Carolina |
| January 10, 2015; 8:00 pm, SNY | at Elon | W 79–61 | 13–4 (4–0) | 25 – Tanksley | 10 – Nesmith | 6 – Green | Alumni Gym (1,493); Elon, North Carolina |
| January 14, 2015; 7:00 pm | at Northeastern | L 83–91 | 13–5 (4–1) | 21 – Green | 11 – Tanksley | 11 – Green | Matthews Arena (1,493); Boston |
| January 17, 2015; 2:00 pm | UNC Wilmington | L 74–79 | 13–6 (4–2) | 19 – Tanksley | 8 – Tanksley | 3 – Tied | Mack Sports Complex (1,839); Hempstead, New York |
| January 21, 2015; 7:00 pm | Drexel | W 86–58 | 14–6 (5–2) | 23 – Bernardi | 10 – Nichols | 11 – Green | Mack Sports Complex (1,020); Hempstead, New York |
| January 24, 2015; 4:00 pm | James Madison | L 63–69 | 14–7 (5–3) | 16 – Green | 11 – Kone | 7 – Green | Mack Sports Complex (2,826); Hempstead, New York |
| January 28, 2015; 7:00 pm | at William & Mary | L 79–100 | 14–8 (5–4) | 23 – Bernardi | 10 – Tanksley | 4 – Green | Kaplan Arena (2,919); Williamsburg, Virginia |
| January 31, 2015; 8:00 pm, SNY | Towson | L 72–86 | 14–9 (5–5) | 25 – Green | 5 – Tanksley | 5 – Green | Mack Sports Complex (2,122); Hempstead, New York |
| February 4, 2015; 7:00 pm | at Delaware | W 79–69 | 15–9 (6–5) | 22 – Tanksley | 6 – Tanksley | 6 – Green | Bob Carpenter Center (2,264); Newark, Delaware |
| February 7, 2015; 7:00 pm | Elon | W 80–69 | 16–9 (7–5) | 22 – Nesmith | 9 – Kone | 10 – Green | Mack Sports Complex (2,017); Hempstead, New York |
| February 12, 2015; 7:00 pm, NBCSN | Northeastern | L 68–79 | 16–10 (7–6) | 18 – Green | 5 – Gustys | 10 – Green | Mack Sports Complex (2,352); Hempstead, New York |
| February 15, 2015; 5:00 pm, SNY | at Drexel | W 81–57 | 17–10 (8–6) | 23 – Kone | 8 – Nichols | 6 – Green | Daskalakis Athletic Center (1,501); Philadelphia |
| February 18, 2015; 7:00 pm | at Towson | W 87–82 | 18–10 (9–6) | 8 – Tied | 9 – Kone | 7 – Green | SECU Arena (1,610); Towson, Maryland |
| February 22, 2015; 4:30 pm, NBCSN | William & Mary | L 78–80 | 18–11 (9–7) | 21 – Green | 7 – Nichols | 9 – Nesmith | Mack Sports Complex (3,148); Hempstead, New York |
| February 25, 2015; 7:00 pm | College of Charleston | W 73–40 | 19–11 (10–7) | 16 – Kone | 10 – Kone | 8 – Green | Mack Sports Complex (1,529); Hempstead, New York |
| February 28, 2015; 4:00 pm, SNY | at James Madison | L 73–82 | 19–12 (10–8) | 22 – Bernardi | 5 – 3 Tied | 4 – Green | JMU Convocation Center (6,185); Harrisonburg, Virginia |
CAA tournament
| March 7, 2015; 2:30 pm, CSN | vs. James Madison; Quarterfinals | W 74–57 | 20–12 | 18 – Kone | 11 – Kone | 3 – Tied | Royal Farms Arena (3,762); Baltimore |
| March 8, 2015; 2:30 pm, NBCSN | vs. William & Mary; Semifinals | L 91–92 ^{2OT} | 20–13 | 26 – Green | 9 – Gustys | 7 – Green | Royal Farms Arena (3,703); Baltimore, Maryland |
College Basketball Invitational
| March 18, 2015*; 7:00 pm | Vermont; First round | L 81–85 | 20–14 | 16 – Green | 9 – Kone | 7 – Tanksley | Mack Sports Complex (958); Hempstead, New York |
*Non-conference game. ^{#}Rankings from AP Poll. (#) Tournament seedings in parentheses. All times are in Eastern Time.

== See also ==
2014–15 Hofstra Pride women's basketball team
