= Earl Grant =

Earl Grant may refer to:

- Earl Grant (basketball)
- Earl Grant (musician)
