= 2014–15 Charleston Cougars men's basketball team =

American college basketball season

2014–15 Charleston Cougars men's basketball
- Conference: Colonial Athletic Association
- Record: 9–24 (3–15 CAA)
- Head coach: Earl Grant (1st season)
- Assistant coaches: Dick Bender; Antonio Reynolds Dean; Quinton Ferrell
- Home arena: TD Arena

2014–15 CAA men's basketball standings
	Conf.				Overall
Team	W		L	PCT	W		L	PCT
William & Mary	12	–	6	.667	20	–	13	.606
UNC Wilmington	12	–	6	.667	18	–	14	.563
Northeastern †	12	–	6	.667	23	–	12	.657
James Madison	12	–	6	.667	19	–	14	.576
Hofstra	10	–	8	.556	20	–	14	.588
Delaware	9	–	9	.500	10	–	20	.333
Drexel	9	–	9	.500	11	–	19	.367
Elon	6	–	12	.333	15	–	18	.455
Towson	5	–	13	.278	12	–	20	.375
College of Charleston	3	–	15	.167	9	–	24	.273
† 2015 CAA tournament winner Rankings from AP poll

The 2014–15 College of Charleston Cougars men's basketball team represented the College of Charleston during the 2014–15 NCAA Division I men's basketball season. The Cougars played their home games at the TD Arena and were in their second year as members of the Colonial Athletic Association. On August 5, 2014, before the season began, head coach Doug Wojcik had his employment terminated for just cause effective immediately. This decision was made following numerous accusations that Wojick verbally and physically abused and threatened players.

On September 2, 2014 the university announced that former Clemson assistant coach Earl Grant had been named the head basketball coach for the Cougars.

The Cougars finished the season 9–24, 3–15 in CAA play to finish in last place. They advanced to the quarterfinals of the CAA tournament where they lost to UNC Wilmington.

== Previous season ==
The Cougars finished the season 14–18, 6–10 in CAA play to finish in a tie for sixth place. They lost in the quarterfinals of the CAA tournament to William & Mary.

== Departures ==
Name	Number	Pos.	Height	Weight	Year	Hometown	Notes
Johnathan Burroughs-Cook	2	G	6'1"	175	Freshman	Memphis, Tennessee	Transferred to Southwest Tennessee State
Anthony Thomas	3	F	6'7"	207	Senior	Winston-Salem, North Carolina	Graduated
Nori Johnson	11	G/F	6'5"	209	Senior	Greer, South Carolina	Graduated
Theo Johnson	14	G/F	6'6"	195	Sophomore	Sacramento, California	Transferred to Liberty
Judson Hall	41	F	6'6"	200	Senior	Charlotte, North Carolina	Graduated
Willis Hall	53	F	6'6"	235	RS Senior	Charlotte, North Carolina	Graduated

== Recruiting ==
College recruiting information
Name	Hometown	School	Height	Weight	Commit date
Evan Bailey; SG	Massillon, Ohio	Jackson High School	6 ft 6 in (1.98 m)	185 lb (84 kg)	Sep 1, 2013
Evan Bailey; SG	Recruit ratings: Scout: Rivals: (70)				
Donovan Gilmore; PF	Greensboro, North Carolina	Wesleyan Christian Academy	6 ft 7 in (2.01 m)	190 lb (86 kg)	Apr 16, 2013
Donovan Gilmore; PF	Recruit ratings: Scout: Rivals: (NR)				
Nick Harris; PF	Atlanta	Saint Pius X Catholic High School	6 ft 10 in (2.08 m)	220 lb (100 kg)	Sep 11, 2013
Nick Harris; PF	Recruit ratings: Scout: Rivals: (NR)				
Cameron Johnson; SG	Athens, Georgia	Clarke Central High School	6 ft 4 in (1.93 m)	190 lb (86 kg)	Apr 12, 2014
Cameron Johnson; SG	Recruit ratings: Scout: Rivals: (NR)				
Glen Pierre; C	Oldsmar, Florida	Oldsmar Christian School	6 ft 11 in (2.11 m)	220 lb (100 kg)	Apr 14, 2013
Glen Pierre; C	Recruit ratings: Scout: Rivals: (NR)				
Overall recruit ranking:
Note: In many cases, Scout, Rivals, 247Sports, On3, and ESPN may conflict in their listings of height and weight.; In these cases, the average was taken. ESPN grades are on a 100-point scale.; Sources: "2014 Team Ranking". Rivals.

== Roster ==
2014–15 College of Charleston Cougars men's basketball team
Players
Coaches

Pos.	#	Name	Height	Weight	Year	Previous school	Hometown
F	0	Donovan Gilmore	6 ft 7 in (2.01 m)	190 lb (86 kg)	Fr	Wesleyan Christian Academy	Greensboro, North Carolina
F/C	1	Adjehi Baru	6 ft 9 in (2.06 m)	225 lb (102 kg)	Sr	Steward School	Abidjan, Ivory Coast
G	4	John Eck (W)	6 ft 4 in (1.93 m)	175 lb (79 kg)	Fr	Hilton Head Prep	Hilton Head Island, South Carolina
F/C	5	Glen Pierre, Jr.	6 ft 11 in (2.11 m)	210 lb (95 kg)	So	Oldsmar Christian School	Orlando, Florida
G	10	Pat Branin	6 ft 1 in (1.85 m)	190 lb (86 kg)	Sr	The Steward School	Richmond, Virginia
F	11	Evan Bailey	6 ft 6 in (1.98 m)	195 lb (88 kg)	Fr	Jackson	Canton, Ohio
G	12	Cameron Johnson	6 ft 4 in (1.93 m)	190 lb (86 kg)	Fr	Clarke Central	Athens, Georgia
G	13	Joe Chealey	6 ft 3 in (1.91 m)	180 lb (82 kg)	So	Apopka	Orlando, Florida
F	15	Terrance O'Donohue	6 ft 7 in (2.01 m)	225 lb (102 kg)	So	Norcross	Norcorss, Georgia
G	22	Anthony Stitt	6 ft 1 in (1.85 m)	180 lb (82 kg)	Sr	Butler	Charlotte, North Carolina
F	23	Nick Harris	6 ft 10 in (2.08 m)	220 lb (100 kg)	Fr	St. Pius X Catholic	Dacula, Georgia
G	24	Canyon Barry	6 ft 6 in (1.98 m)	195 lb (88 kg)	RS So	Cheyenne Mountain	Colorado Springs, Colorado
G	25	Tim Branin II (W)	6 ft 1 in (1.85 m)	185 lb (84 kg)	Fr	Deep Run	Richmond, Virginia
F	31	Harrison Bowne	6 ft 6 in (1.98 m)	230 lb (104 kg)	Jr	St. Stephens	Hickory, North Carolina
C	33	David Wishon	7 ft 2 in (2.18 m)	265 lb (120 kg)	RS Jr	Tulsa; Concord	Concord, North Carolina

Head coach

- Earl Grant (Georgia College)

Assistant coach(es)

- Dick Bender (McDaniel)
- Antonio Reynolds Dean (Rhode Island)
- Quinton Ferrell (Presbyterian)

Legend

- (C) Team captain
- (S) Suspended
- (I) Ineligible
- (W) Walk-on
- Injured
- Current redshirt

Roster

== Schedule ==
Date time, TV	Opponent	Result	Record	Site (attendance) city, state
Exhibition
11/08/2014*; 12:00 pm	Emory	W 78–68	–	TD Arena (2,012); Charleston, South Carolina
Non-conference regular season
11/14/2014*; 8:00 pm, ESPN3	at Furman	W 75-40	1-0	Timmons Arena (1,242); Greenville, South Carolina
11/17/2014*; 7:00 pm, WCIV	Gardner–Webb	L 67–80	1–1	TD Arena (3,527); Charleston, South Carolina
11/20/2014*; 12:30 pm, ESPNU	vs. No. 17 UConn; Puerto Rico Tip-Off quarterfinals	L 57–65	1–2	Roberto Clemente Coliseum (6,723); San Juan, PR
11/21/2014*; 1:00 pm, ESPNU	vs. Texas A&M; Puerto Rico Tip-Off consolation round	L 50–59	1–3	Roberto Clemente Coliseum (7,438); San Juan, PR
11/23/2014*; 11:30 am, ESPN3	vs. George Mason; Puerto Rico Tip-Off 7th place game	W 61–60	2–3	Roberto Clemente Coliseum (8,002); San Juan, PR
11/29/2014*; 7:30 pm, RTPT	at No. 21 West Virginia; Puerto Rico Tip-Off	L 57–86	2–4	WVU Coliseum (7,367); Morgantown, West Virginia
12/02/2014*; 7:30 pm, WCIV	The Citadel	W 59–55	3–4	TD Arena (3,462); Charleston, South Carolina
12/11/2014*; 7:30 pm, WCIV	South Carolina State	W 50–47	4–4	TD Arena (2,626); Charleston, South Carolina
12/14/2014*; 2:00 pm, WCIV	Campbell	W 58–47	5–4	TD Arena (1,817); Charleston, South Carolina
12/16/2014*; 7:00 pm, ASN	at Charlotte	L 85–90 ^{OT}	5–5	Dale F. Halton Arena (3,527); Charlotte, North Carolina
12/20/2014*; 4:00 pm, WCIV	Davidson	L 68–80	5–6	TD Arena (3,671); Charleston, South Carolina
12/22/2014*; 9:00 pm, SECN	at LSU	L 47–71	5–7	Maravich Center (7,808); Baton Rouge, Louisiana
12/30/2014*; 7:00 pm, ESPN3	at Miami (FL)	L 40–67	5–8	BankUnited Center (4,705); Coral Gables, Florida
CAA Regular Season
01/03/2015; 2:00 pm	at William & Mary	L 45–75	5–9 (0–1)	Kaplan Arena (2,291); Williamsburg, Virginia
01/05/2015; 7:30 pm, WCIV	James Madison	L 50–61	5–10 (0–2)	TD Arena (1,865); Charleston, South Carolina
01/08/2015; 7:30 pm, WCIV	Hofstra	L 66–71	5–11 (0–3)	TD Arena (1,805); Charleston, South Carolina
01/10/2015; 6:00 pm, WCIV	Delaware	L 58–64	5–12 (0–4)	TD Arena (2,851); Charleston, South Carolina
01/14/2015; 7:00 pm	at Elon	W 66–50	6–12 (1–4)	Alumni Gym (1,235); Elon, North Carolina
01/17/2015; 7:00 pm	at Northeastern	L 67–69	6–13 (1–5)	Matthews Arena (1,624); Boston
01/21/2015; 7:30 pm, WCIV	UNC Wilmington	L 56–58	6–14 (1–6)	TD Arena (3,013); Charleston, South Carolina
01/24/2015; 12:00 pm, NBCSN	at Drexel	W 51–43	6–15 (1–7)	Daskalakis Athletic Center (1,343); Philadelphia
01/29/2015; 7:00 pm	at Towson	L 70–74	6–16 (1–8)	SECU Arena (2,816); Towson, Maryland
01/31/2015; 2:00 pm	at Delaware	L 68–71	6–17 (1–9)	Bob Carpenter Center (2,863); Newark, Delaware
02/05/2015; 7:30 pm, WCIV	William & Mary	W 80–72	7–17 (2–9)	TD Arena (3,305); Charleston, South Carolina
02/07/2015; 5:00 pm, WCIV	Drexel	L 45–59	7–18 (2–10)	TD Arena (3,769); Charleston, South Carolina
02/11/2015; 7:00 pm	at UNC Wilmington	L 45–58	7–19 (2–11)	Trask Coliseum (3,895); Wilmington, North Carolina
02/15/2015; 12:30 pm, NBCSN	Towson	L 50–53	7–20 (2–12)	TD Arena (2,232); Charleston, South Carolina
02/18/2015; 7:00 pm	Elon	W 77–63	8–20 (3–12)	TD Arena (1,729); Charleston, South Carolina
02/22/2015; 12:00 pm, CSN/WCIV	at James Madison; Postponed from 02/21/2015	L 61–68	8–21 (3–13)	JMU Convocation Center (3652); Harrisonburg, Virginia
02/25/2015; 7:00 pm	Hofstra	L 40–73	8–22 (3–14)	Mack Sports Complex (1,529); Hempstead, New York
02/28/2015; 8:00 pm, ASN	Northeastern	L 56–65	8–23 (3–15)	TD Arena (2,603); Charleston, South Carolina
CAA tournament
03/06/2015; 8:30 pm	vs. Drexel; First round	W 56–48	9–23	Royal Farms Arena (2,552); Baltimore
03/07/2015; 6:00 pm, CSN	vs. UNC Wilmington; Quarterfinals	L 53–79	9–24	Royal Farms Arena (3,016); Baltimore, Maryland
*Non-conference game. ^{#}Rankings from AP Poll. (#) Tournament seedings in parentheses. All times are in Eastern Time.
