= 2014–15 Delaware Fightin' Blue Hens men's basketball team =

American college basketball season

2014–15 Delaware Fightin' Blue Hens men's basketball
- Conference: Colonial Athletic Association
- Record: 10–20 (9–9 CAA)
- Head coach: Monté Ross (9th season)
- Assistant coaches: Jeff Rafferty; Phil Martelli, Jr.; Chris Cheeks; Saul Rafel-Frankel
- Home arena: Bob Carpenter Center

2014–15 CAA men's basketball standings
	Conf.				Overall
Team	W		L	PCT	W		L	PCT
William & Mary	12	–	6	.667	20	–	13	.606
UNC Wilmington	12	–	6	.667	18	–	14	.563
Northeastern †	12	–	6	.667	23	–	12	.657
James Madison	12	–	6	.667	19	–	14	.576
Hofstra	10	–	8	.556	20	–	14	.588
Delaware	9	–	9	.500	10	–	20	.333
Drexel	9	–	9	.500	11	–	19	.367
Elon	6	–	12	.333	15	–	18	.455
Towson	5	–	13	.278	12	–	20	.375
College of Charleston	3	–	15	.167	9	–	24	.273
† 2015 CAA tournament winner Rankings from AP poll

The 2014–15 Delaware Fightin' Blue Hens men's basketball team represented the University of Delaware during the 2014–15 NCAA Division I men's basketball season. The Fightin' Blue Hens, led by ninth year head coach Monté Ross, played their home games at the Bob Carpenter Center and were members of the Colonial Athletic Association. They finished the season 10–20, 9–9 in CAA play to finish in a tie for sixth place. They lost in the quarterfinals of the CAA tournament to Northeastern.

== Previous season ==
The Fightin' Blue Hens finished the season 25–10, 14–2 in CAA play to win the CAA regular season championship. They were also champions of the CAA tournament to earn an automatic bid to the NCAA tournament where they lost in the second round to Michigan State.

== Departures ==
Name	Number	Pos.	Height	Weight	Year	Hometown	Notes
Davon Usher	0	G	6'6"	200	Senior	Baltimore	Graduated
Jarvis Threatt	4	G	6'2"	170	Junior	Richmond, Virginia	Dismissed from the team
Devon Saddler	10	G	6'2"	210	Senior	Aberdeen, Maryland	Graduated
Carl Baptiste	33	F	6'9"	260	Senior	Pittstown, New Jersey	Graduated
Tommy Williams	55	F	6'8"	205	Senior	Hamden, Connecticut	Graduated

== Recruiting ==
College recruiting
Name	Hometown	School	Height	Weight	Commit date
Chivarsky Corbett; SF	Tampa, Florida	Tampa Catholic High School	6 ft 5 in (1.96 m)	190 lb (86 kg)	Oct 25, 2013
Chivarsky Corbett; SF	Recruit ratings: Scout: Rivals: (NR)				
Kory Holden; PG	Salisbury, Maryland	J. M. Bennett High School	6 ft 2 in (1.88 m)	175 lb (79 kg)	Sep 7, 2013
Kory Holden; PG	Recruit ratings: Scout: Rivals: (NR)				
Skye Johnson; PF	Lynchburg, Virginia	Virginia Episcopal School	6 ft 9 in (2.06 m)	230 lb (100 kg)	Sep 23, 2013
Skye Johnson; PF	Recruit ratings: Scout: Rivals: (NR)				
Eric Carter; PF	Jackson, New Jersey	Jackson Memorial High School	6 ft 9 in (2.06 m)	220 lb (100 kg)	Sep 27, 2013
Eric Carter; PF	Recruit ratings: Scout: Rivals: (NR)				
Anthony Mosley; SG	Hockessin, Delaware	Sanford School	6 ft 1 in (1.85 m)	180 lb (82 kg)	Oct 1, 2013
Anthony Mosley; SG	Recruit ratings: Scout: Rivals: (NR)				
Overall recruit ranking:
Note: In many cases, Scout, Rivals, 247Sports, On3, and ESPN may conflict in their listings of height and weight.; In these cases, the average was taken. ESPN grades are on a 100-point scale.; Sources: "2014 Team Ranking". Rivals.

== Roster ==
2014–15 Delaware Fightin' Blue Hens men's basketball team
Players
Coaches

Pos.	#	Name	Height	Weight	Year	Hometown
G	0	Chivarsky Corbett	6 ft 7 in (2.01 m)	195 lb (88 kg)	Fr	Tampa, Florida
G	1	Kory Holden	6 ft 2 in (1.88 m)	180 lb (82 kg)	Fr	Salisbury, Maryland
F	2	Barnett Harris	6 ft 9 in (2.06 m)	215 lb (98 kg)	So	Monroeville, Pennsylvania
G	3	Anthony Mosley	6 ft 1 in (1.85 m)	180 lb (82 kg)	Fr	Wilmington, Delaware
G	4	Curtis McRoy	6 ft 2 in (1.88 m)	170 lb (77 kg)	Fr	Annapolis, Maryland
F	5	Eric Carter	6 ft 9 in (2.06 m)	230 lb (104 kg)	Fr	Jackson, New Jersey
F	11	Devonne Pinkard	6 ft 6 in (1.98 m)	200 lb (91 kg)	So	Lancaster, Pennsylvania
G	13	Kyle Anderson (C)	6 ft 3 in (1.91 m)	200 lb (91 kg)	Sr	Newark, Illinois
F	15	Maurice Jeffers	6 ft 9 in (2.06 m)	240 lb (109 kg)	RS So	Washington, D.C.
F	21	Marvin King-Davis (C)	6 ft 7 in (2.01 m)	230 lb (104 kg)	RS Jr	Richmond, Virginia
G	22	Cazmon Hayes	6 ft 4 in (1.93 m)	195 lb (88 kg)	So	Charlotte, North Carolina
F	23	Skye Johnson	6 ft 8 in (2.03 m)	240 lb (109 kg)	Fr	Lynchburg, Virginia
G	24	Sean Locke (W)	6 ft 4 in (1.93 m)	195 lb (88 kg)	Jr	Newark, Delaware
F	54	Tom Allshouse	6 ft 6 in (1.98 m)	235 lb (107 kg)	Sr	Middletown, Delaware

Head coach

- Monté Ross (Winston Salem State)

Assistant coach(es)

- Jeff Rafferty (Springfield)
- Chris Cheeks (Virginia Commonwealth)
- Phil Martelli, Jr. (Saint Joseph's)

Legend

- (C) Team captain
- (S) Suspended
- (I) Ineligible
- (W) Walk-on
- Injured
- Current redshirt

Roster

== Schedule ==
Date time, TV	Opponent	Result	Record	Site (attendance) city, state
Regular season
11/17/2014*; 7:00 pm	at Liberty	L 55–61	0–1	Vines Center (1,897); Lynchburg, Virginia
11/21/2014*; 10:00 pm	at Cal Poly	L 60–78	0–2	Mott Gym (2,417); San Luis Obispo, California
11/23/2014*; 7:00 pm	at Cal State Bakersfield	L 52–70	0–3	Icardo Center (841); Bakersfield, California
11/25/2014*; 11:00 pm, P12N	at Stanford	L 47–84	0–4	Maples Pavilion (4,075); Palo Alto, California
11/30/2014*; 4:30 pm, FS1	at No. 12 Villanova	L 47–78	0–5	Wells Fargo Center (11,289); Philadelphia
12/03/2014*; 7:00 pm	Army	L 69–73	0–6	Bob Carpenter Center (1,707); Newark, Delaware
12/07/2014*; 12:00 pm	Delaware State	L 53–66	0–7	Bob Carpenter Center (2,020); Newark, Delaware
12/18/2014*; 7:00 pm	Temple	L 62–82	0–8	Bob Carpenter Center (2,182); Newark, Delaware
12/20/2014*; 2:00 pm	at Fairleigh Dickinson	L 74–76	0–9	Rothman Center (502); Hackensack, New Jersey
12/22/2014*; 7:00 pm	at Robert Morris	L 81–84	0–10	Charles L. Sewall Center (657); Moon Township, Pennsylvania
12/30/2014*; 7:00 pm	St. Bonaventure	W 82–77	1–10	Bob Carpenter Center (2,050); Newark, Delaware
01/03/2015; 2:00 pm	Northeastern	L 53–72	1–11 (0–1)	Bob Carpenter Center (2,202); Newark, Delaware
01/05/2015; 7:00 pm	at Hofstra	L 58–71	1–12 (0–2)	Mack Sports Complex (1,341); Hempstead, New York
01/08/2015; 7:00 pm	at UNC Wilmington	L 73–74 ^{OT}	1–13 (0–3)	Trask Coliseum (2,862); Wilmington, North Carolina
01/10/2015; 6:00 pm	at College of Charleston	W 64–58	2–13 (1–3)	TD Arena (2,851); Charleston, South Carolina
01/14/2015; 7:00 pm	Towson	W 67–64 ^{OT}	3–13 (2–3)	Bob Carpenter Center (1,765); Newark, Delaware
01/17/2015; 2:00 pm, CSN	Drexel	L 62–66	3–14 (2–4)	Bob Carpenter Center (3,275); Newark, Delaware
01/21/2015; 7:00 pm	William & Mary	W 84–80	4–14 (3–4)	Bob Carpenter Center (1,819); Newark, Delaware
01/24/2015; 7:00 pm	at Elon	L 82–94	4–15 (3–5)	Alumni Gym (1,711); Elon, North Carolina
01/28/2015; 7:00 pm	at James Madison	L 82–88	4–16 (3–6)	JMU Convocation Center (2,806); Harrisonburg, Virginia
01/31/2015; 2:00 pm	College of Charleston	W 71–68	5–16 (4–6)	Bob Carpenter Center (2,863); Newark, Delaware
02/04/2015; 7:00 pm	Hofstra	L 69–79	5–17 (4–7)	Bob Carpenter Center (2,264); Newark, Delaware
02/07/2015; 12:00 pm, CSN	at Northeastern	W 73–68	6–17 (5–7)	Matthews Arena (1,423); Boston
02/10/2015; 8:00 pm, CSN	James Madison	L 54–67	6–18 (5–8)	Bob Carpenter Center (2,318); Newark, Delaware
02/14/2015; 2:30 pm, NBCSN	at William & Mary	W 73–70	7–18 (6–8)	Kaplan Arena (4,185); Williamsburg, Virginia
02/19/2015; 7:00 pm	UNC Wilmington	W 70–59	8–18 (7–8)	Bob Carpenter Center (2,083); Newark, Delaware
02/21/2015; 12:30 pm, ASN	Elon	L 75–83 ^{OT}	8–19 (7–9)	Bob Carpenter Center (2,890); Newark, Delaware
02/26/2015; 7:00 pm, CSN	at Drexel	W 58–44	9–19 (8–9)	Daskalakis Athletic Center (1,689); Philadelphia
02/28/2015; 2:00 pm	at Towson	W 65–60	10–19 (9–9)	SECU Arena (3,893); Towson, Maryland
CAA tournament
03/07/2015; 8:30 pm, CSN	vs. Northeastern; Quarterfinals	L 64–67	10–20	Royal Farms Arena (3,016); Baltimore
*Non-conference game. ^{#}Rankings from AP Poll. (#) Tournament seedings in parentheses. All times are in Eastern Time.

== See also ==
2014–15 Delaware Fightin' Blue Hens women's basketball team
