= 2014–15 Towson Tigers men's basketball team =

American college basketball season

2014–15 Towson Tigers men's basketball
- Conference: Colonial Athletic Association
- Record: 12–20 (5–13 CAA)
- Head coach: Pat Skerry (4th season)
- Assistant coaches: Kevin Clark; Jim McCarthy; Bruce Shingler
- Home arena: SECU Arena

2014–15 CAA men's basketball standings
	Conf.				Overall
Team	W		L	PCT	W		L	PCT
William & Mary	12	–	6	.667	20	–	13	.606
UNC Wilmington	12	–	6	.667	18	–	14	.563
Northeastern †	12	–	6	.667	23	–	12	.657
James Madison	12	–	6	.667	19	–	14	.576
Hofstra	10	–	8	.556	20	–	14	.588
Delaware	9	–	9	.500	10	–	20	.333
Drexel	9	–	9	.500	11	–	19	.367
Elon	6	–	12	.333	15	–	18	.455
Towson	5	–	13	.278	12	–	20	.375
College of Charleston	3	–	15	.167	9	–	24	.273
† 2015 CAA tournament winner Rankings from AP poll

The 2014–15 Towson Tigers men's basketball team represented Towson University during the 2014–15 NCAA Division I men's basketball season. The Tigers, led by fourth year head coach Pat Skerry, played their home games at SECU Arena and were members of the Colonial Athletic Association. They finished the season 12–20, 5–13 in CAA play to finish in ninth place. They lost in the first round of the CAA tournament to Elon.

== Previous season ==
The Tigers finished the season 25–11, 13–3 in CAA play to finish in second place. They advanced to the semifinals of the CAA tournament where they lost to William & Mary. They were invited to the CollegeInsider.com Tournament where they defeated USC Upstate and East Tennessee State to advance to the quarterfinals where they lost to Murray State.

== Departures ==
Name	Number	Pos.	Height	Weight	Year	Hometown	Notes
Jerome Hairston	0	G	6'3"	190	Sophomore	Cheyenne, Wyoming	Suspended
Marcus Damas	1	F	6'7"	210	Senior	Bay Shore, New York	Graduated
Marquis Marshall	2	G	6'5"	170	RS Freshman	Reading, Pennsylvania	Transferred to East Stroudsburg
Barrington Alston	12	F	6'8"	220	RS Freshman	Wilmington, Delaware	Transferred to College of Central Florida
Jerrelle Benimon	20	F	6'8"	245	Senior	Warrenton, Virginia	Graduated
Rafriel Guthrie	22	F/G	6'3"	210	Senior	Washington, D.C.	Graduated

=== Incoming transfers ===
Name	Number	Pos.	Height	Weight	Year	Hometown	Previous School
Josh Ivory	0	G	6'2"	200	Junior	Alexandria, Louisiana	Baton Rouge Community College
Alex Gavrilovic	11	F	6'9"	246	Senior	Strasbourg, France	Dayton
Arnaud William Adala Moto	24	F	6'6"	225	Junior	Yaoundé, Cameroon	Wake Forest

== Recruiting ==
College recruiting information
Name	Hometown	School	Height	Weight	Commit date
Eddie Keith; SF	Orlando, Florida	Edgewater High School	6 ft 5 in (1.96 m)	210 lb (95 kg)	Nov 1, 2013
Eddie Keith; SF	Recruit ratings: Scout: Rivals: (69)				
Allen Costley; SF	Baltimore	Milford Mill Academy	6 ft 5 in (1.96 m)	180 lb (82 kg)	Jul 30, 2013
Allen Costley; SF	Recruit ratings: Scout: Rivals: (NR)				
Byron Hawkins; PG	Upper Marlboro, Maryland	Clinton Christian School	6 ft 0 in (1.83 m)	171 lb (78 kg)	Sep 9, 2013
Byron Hawkins; PG	Recruit ratings: Scout: Rivals: (NR)				
Mike Morsell; PF	Washington, D.C.	Saint John's College High School	6 ft 5 in (1.96 m)	190 lb (86 kg)	Jan 13, 2014
Mike Morsell; PF	Recruit ratings: Scout: Rivals: (NR)				
Jordan McNeil; SG	Baltimore, Maryland	Mount St. Joseph High School	6 ft 5 in (1.96 m)	183 lb (83 kg)	Sep 9, 2013
Jordan McNeil; SG	Recruit ratings: Scout: Rivals: (NR)				
Overall recruit ranking:
Note: In many cases, Scout, Rivals, 247Sports, On3, and ESPN may conflict in their listings of height and weight.; In these cases, the average was taken. ESPN grades are on a 100-point scale.; Sources: "2014 Team Ranking". Rivals.

== Roster ==
2014–15 Towson Tigers men's basketball team
Players
Coaches

Pos.	#	Name	Height	Weight	Year	Previous school	Hometown
G	0	Josh Ivory	6 ft 2 in (1.88 m)	195 lb (88 kg)	Jr	Baton Rouge CC	Alexandria, Louisiana
G	1	Bryon Hawkins	6 ft 1 in (1.85 m)	175 lb (79 kg)	Fr	Clinton Christian School	Fort Washington, Maryland
G	2	Jordan McNeil (redshirt)	6 ft 5 in (1.96 m)	185 lb (84 kg)	Fr	Mount St. Joseph	Baltimore
G	4	Four McGlynn	6 ft 2 in (1.88 m)	180 lb (82 kg)	RS Jr	Dallastown Area	York, Pennsylvania
F/C	5	Walter Foster	6 ft 8 in (2.03 m)	230 lb (104 kg)	So	Booker T. Washington	Atlanta
F	10	John Davis	6 ft 5 in (1.96 m)	215 lb (98 kg)	So	Saints John Neumann and Maria Goretti	Philadelphia
F	11	Alex Gavrilovic	6 ft 9 in (2.06 m)	245 lb (111 kg)	Sr	IMG Academy	Strasbourg, France
F	15	Timajh Parker-Rivera	6 ft 7 in (2.01 m)	215 lb (98 kg)	Jr	St. Joseph	Milford, Connecticut
F	23	Mike Morsell	6 ft 5 in (1.96 m)	190 lb (86 kg)	Fr	St. John's College HS	Fort Washington, Maryland
F	24	Arnaud William Adala Moto (redshirt)	6 ft 6 in (1.98 m)	225 lb (102 kg)	Jr	Episcopal	Yaoundé, Cameroon
G	25	A. J. Astroth	6 ft 6 in (1.98 m)	200 lb (91 kg)	RS So	Wharton	Tampa, Florida
G	32	Jonah Meredith (W)	6 ft 5 in (1.96 m)	160 lb (73 kg)	So	Frederick	Frederick, Maryland
F	33	Eddie Keith	6 ft 5 in (1.96 m)	220 lb (100 kg)	Fr	Edgewater	Orlando, Florida
F	44	Jamel Flash	6 ft 10 in (2.08 m)	220 lb (100 kg)	RS Sr	West Hempstead	West Hempstead, New York

Head coach

- Pat Skerry (Tufts)

Assistant coach(es)

- Kevin Clark (Clark)
- Jim McCarthy (Hamilton College)
- Bruce Shingler (St. Augustine's)

Legend

- (C) Team captain
- (S) Suspended
- (I) Ineligible
- (W) Walk-on
- Injured
- Current redshirt

Roster

== Schedule ==
Date time, TV	Opponent	Result	Record	Site (attendance) city, state
Exhibition
11/07/2014*; 8:00 pm	Slippery Rock	W 69–57		SECU Arena (1,543); Towson, Maryland
Regular season
11/14/2014*; 9:00 pm	at Alabama; CBE Hall of Fame Classic	L 54–82	0–1	Coleman Coliseum (10,345); Tuscaloosa, Alabama
11/17/2014*; 7:00 pm	at Morgan State	W 51–46	1–1	Talmadge L. Hill Field House (3,874); Baltimore
11/21/2014*; 5:00 pm	vs. Central Connecticut; CBE Hall of Fame Classic	W 58–49	2–1	Multipurpose Activity Center (1,428); West Long Branch, New Jersey
11/22/2014*; 5:00 pm	vs. Bethune-Cookman; CBE Hall of Fame Classic	W 63–42	3–1	Multipurpose Activity Center (1,357); West Long Branch, New Jersey
11/23/2014*; 4:30 pm	at Monmouth; CBE Hall of Fame Classic	W 79–75 ^{OT}	4–1	Multipurpose Activity Center (1,225); West Long Branch, New Jersey
11/26/2014*; 7:00 pm	Goucher	W 97–43	5–1	SECU Arena (1,504); Towson, Maryland
11/29/2014*; 1:00 pm	at UMBC	W 77–66	6–1	Retriever Activities Center (676); Catonsville, Maryland
12/03/2014*; 7:00 pm	Coppin State	W 84–76	7–1	SECU Arena (2,154); Towson, Maryland
12/07/2014*; 12:00 pm, FS1	at Georgetown; BB&T Classic	L 46–78	7–2	Verizon Center (8,756); Washington, D.C.
12/10/2014*; 7:00 pm, ESPN3	at Temple	L 64–76	7–3	Liacouras Center (2,308); Philadelphia
12/20/2014*; 7:00 pm	La Salle	L 53–67	7–4	SECU Arena (2,104); Towson, Maryland
12/22/2014*; 7:00 pm	at Navy	L 56–61	7–5	Alumni Hall (1,064); Annapolis, Maryland
12/29/2014*; 7:00 pm	Fairleigh Dickinson	L 84–85 ^{OT}	7–6	SECU Arena (1,664); Towson, Maryland
01/03/2015; 4:00 pm	at James Madison	L 52–61	7–7 (0–1)	JMU Convocation Center (2,731); Harrisonburg, Virginia
01/05/2015; 7:00 pm	Elon	W 57–53	8–7 (1–1)	SECU Arena (1,274); Towson, Maryland
01/08/2015; 7:00 pm	Drexel	L 41–55	8–8 (1–2)	SECU Arena (1,285); Towson, Maryland
01/10/2015; 2:00 pm, CSN	Northeastern	L 49–52	8–9 (1–3)	SECU Arena (1,507); Towson, Maryland
01/14/2015; 7:00 pm	at Delaware	L 64–67 ^{OT}	8–10 (1–4)	Bob Carpenter Center (1,765); Newark, Delaware
01/17/2015; 12:00 pm, CSN	William & Mary	L 72–85	8–11 (1–5)	SECU Arena (1,889); Towson, Maryland
01/22/2015; 7:00 pm	at Elon	W 53–51	9–11 (2–5)	Alumni Gym (1,141); Elon, North Carolina
01/24/2015; 8:00 pm, ASN	at UNC Wilmington	L 65–69	9–12 (2–6)	Trask Coliseum (4,590); Wilmington, North Carolina
01/29/2015; 7:00 pm	College of Charleston	W 74–70	10–12 (3–6)	SECU Arena (2,816); Towson, Maryland
01/31/2015; 8:00 pm, ASN	at Hofstra	W 86–72	11–12 (4–6)	Mack Sports Complex (2,122); Hempstead, New York
02/04/2015; 7:00 pm	at Northeastern	L 62–69	11–13 (4–7)	Matthews Arena (955); Boston
02/07/2015; 2:00 pm	James Madison	L 61–63	11–14 (4–8)	SECU Arena (3,847); Towson, Maryland
02/10/2015; 6:00 pm, CSN	at Drexel	L 49–53	11–15 (4–9)	Daskalakis Athletic Center (1,301); Philadelphia
02/15/2015; 12:30 pm, NBCSN	at College of Charleston	W 53–50	12–15 (5–9)	TD Arena (2,232); Charleston, South Carolina
02/18/2015; 7:00 pm	Hofstra	L 82–87	12–16 (5–10)	SECU Arena (1,610); Towson, Maryland
02/21/2015; 2:00 pm	UNC Wilmington	L 69–73	12–17 (5–11)	SECU Arena (1,773); Towson, Maryland
02/25/2015; 7:00 pm	at William & Mary	L 50–65	12–18 (5–12)	Kaplan Arena (3,227); Williamsburg, Virginia
02/28/2015; 2:00 pm	Delaware	L 60–65	12–19 (5–13)	SECU Arena (3,893); Towson, Maryland
CAA tournament
03/06/2015; 6:00 pm	vs. Elon; First round	L 69–74 ^{OT}	12–20	Royal Farms Arena (2,552); Baltimore, Maryland
*Non-conference game. ^{#}Rankings from AP Poll. (#) Tournament seedings in parentheses. All times are in Eastern Time.

== See also ==
2014–15 Towson Tigers women's basketball team
