= 2014–15 Elon Phoenix men's basketball team =

American college basketball season

2014–15 Elon Phoenix men's basketball
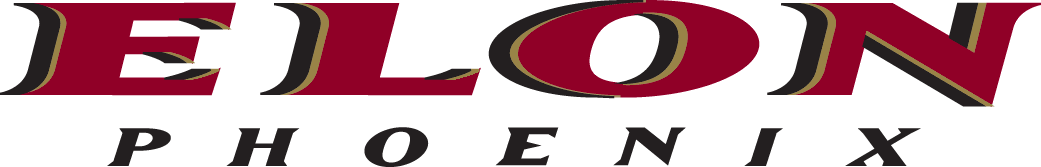
- Conference: Colonial Athletic Association
- Record: 15–18 (6–12 CAA)
- Head coach: Matt Matheny (6th season)
- Assistant coaches: Jack Wooten; Monty Sanders; Chris Long
- Home arena: Alumni Gym

2014–15 CAA men's basketball standings
	Conf.				Overall
Team	W		L	PCT	W		L	PCT
William & Mary	12	–	6	.667	20	–	13	.606
UNC Wilmington	12	–	6	.667	18	–	14	.563
Northeastern †	12	–	6	.667	23	–	12	.657
James Madison	12	–	6	.667	19	–	14	.576
Hofstra	10	–	8	.556	20	–	14	.588
Delaware	9	–	9	.500	10	–	20	.333
Drexel	9	–	9	.500	11	–	19	.367
Elon	6	–	12	.333	15	–	18	.455
Towson	5	–	13	.278	12	–	20	.375
College of Charleston	3	–	15	.167	9	–	24	.273
† 2015 CAA tournament winner Rankings from AP poll

The 2014–15 Elon Phoenix men's basketball team represented Elon University during the 2014–15 NCAA Division I men's basketball season. The Phoenix, led by sixth year head coach Matt Matheny, played their home games at Alumni Gym and were first year members of the Colonial Athletic Association. They finished the season 15–18, 6–12 in CAA play to finish in eighth place. They advanced to the quarterfinals of the CAA tournament where they lost to William & Mary.

== Previous season ==
The Phoenix finished the season 18–14, 11–5 in SoCon play to finish in a tie for third place. They lost in the quarterfinals of the SoCon tournament to Western Carolina.

== Departures ==
Name	Number	Pos.	Height	Weight	Year	Hometown	Notes
Jack Isenbarger	20	G	6'2"	190	Senior	Zionsville, Indiana	Graduated
Ryley Beaumont	21	F	6'7"	220	Senior	Millersville, Maryland	Graduated
Egheosa Edomwonyi	23	F	6'7"	235	Senior	Newark, New Jersey	Graduated
Sebastian Koch	24	G	6'8"	205	Senior	Munich, Germany	Graduated
Lucas Troutman	31	F	6'10"	228	Senior	Belton, South Carolina	Graduated

== Recruiting ==
College recruiting information
Name	Hometown	School	Height	Weight	Commit date
Jack Anton; PF	Mason, Ohio	Moeller High School	6 ft 8 in (2.03 m)	230 lb (100 kg)	Nov 13, 2013
Jack Anton; PF	Recruit ratings: No ratings found				
Elijah Bryant; SG	Hoschton, Georgia	New Hampton School	6 ft 4 in (1.93 m)	190 lb (86 kg)	Apr 1, 2014
Elijah Bryant; SG	Recruit ratings: No ratings found				
Jack George; C	Mundelein, Illinois	Carmel Catholic High School	6 ft 10 in (2.08 m)	210 lb (95 kg)	Apr 22, 2014
Jack George; C	Recruit ratings: No ratings found				
Collin Luther; SF	Allison Park, Pennsylvania	Hampton High School	6 ft 7 in (2.01 m)	200 lb (91 kg)	Apr 24, 2014
Collin Luther; SF	Recruit ratings: No ratings found				
Dmitri Thompson; SG	Orlando, Florida	Orlando Christian Prep	6 ft 4 in (1.93 m)	185 lb (84 kg)	May 11, 2014
Dmitri Thompson; SG	Recruit ratings: Rivals: ESPN: (62)				
Overall recruit ranking:
Note: In many cases, Scout, Rivals, 247Sports, On3, and ESPN may conflict in their listings of height and weight.; In these cases, the average was taken. ESPN grades are on a 100-point scale.; Sources: "Elon". ESPN.; "2014 Team Ranking". Rivals.

== Roster ==
2014–15 Elon Phoenix men's basketball team
Players
Coaches

Pos.	#	Name	Height	Weight	Year	Previous school	Hometown
F	00	Brian Dawkins	6 ft 8 in (2.03 m)	240 lb (109 kg)	So	Bishop Kenny	Jacksonville, Florida
G	1	Luke Eddy	6 ft 0 in (1.83 m)	190 lb (86 kg)	So	George Washington	Charleston, West Virginia
G	2	Dmitri Thompson	6 ft 4 in (1.93 m)	195 lb (88 kg)	Fr	Orlando Christian Prep	Orlando, Florida
G	3	Tanner Samson	6 ft 4 in (1.93 m)	195 lb (88 kg)	Jr	Regis Jesuit	Littleton, Colorado
F	4	Collin Luther	6 ft 6 in (1.98 m)	210 lb (95 kg)	Fr	Hampton	Pittsburgh
G	5	Sam Hershberger (W)	6 ft 0 in (1.83 m)	180 lb (82 kg)	Jr	Butler	Vandalia, Ohio
G	10	Austin Hamilton	5 ft 10 in (1.78 m)	190 lb (86 kg)	Sr	Herndon	Herndon, Virginia
G	11	Kevin Blake	6 ft 3 in (1.91 m)	195 lb (88 kg)	Sr	Oakwood Collegiate Institute	Toronto
G/F	12	Christian Hairston	6 ft 7 in (2.01 m)	205 lb (93 kg)	So	Greensboro Day School	Greensboro, North Carolina
F	14	Jack Anton	6 ft 8 in (2.03 m)	230 lb (104 kg)	Fr	Archbishop Moeller	Mason, Ohio
C	15	Tony Sabato	6 ft 7 in (2.01 m)	220 lb (100 kg)	Jr	Archbishop Moeller	Cincinnati
F	21	Jack George	6 ft 10 in (2.08 m)	210 lb (95 kg)	Fr	Carmel Catholic	Libertyville, Illinois
G	25	Ryder Bowline (W)	6 ft 4 in (1.93 m)	225 lb (102 kg)	So	Forsyth Central	Cumming, Georgia
F	30	Wes Brewer (W)	6 ft 7 in (2.01 m)	230 lb (104 kg)	RS So	Walter Williams	Burlington, North Carolina
F	32	Ryan Winters	6 ft 7 in (2.01 m)	218 lb (99 kg)	Sr	Regis Jesuit	Denver, Colorado
G	33	Elijah Bryant	6 ft 4 in (1.93 m)	200 lb (91 kg)	Fr	New Hampton School	Gwinnett, Georgia
G	42	Patrick Ryan (W)	6 ft 6 in (1.98 m)	190 lb (86 kg)	So	Greens Farms Academy	Darien, Connecticut

Head coach

- Matt Matheny (Davidson)

Assistant coach(es)

- Jack Wooten (North Carolina)
- Monty Sanders (Elon)
- Chris Long (Elon)

Legend

- (C) Team captain
- (S) Suspended
- (I) Ineligible
- (W) Walk-on
- Injured
- Current redshirt

Roster
Last update: October 3, 2014

== Schedule ==
Date time, TV	Opponent	Result	Record	Site (attendance) city, state
Exhibition
November 7, 2014*; 7:00 pm	Emory and Henry	W 90–50		Alumni Gym (N/A); Elon, North Carolina
Regular season
November 14, 2014*; 7:30 pm, ASN	Florida Atlantic	W 64–58	1–0	Alumni Gym (1,421); Elon, North Carolina
November 16, 2014*; 4:30 pm, ASN	Charlotte	L 60–73	1–1	Alumni Gym (1,528); Elon, North Carolina
November 22, 2014*; 1:00 pm	at Northwestern; Cancún Challenge	L 67–68 ^{OT}	1–2	Welsh-Ryan Arena (6,315); Evanston, Illinois
November 25, 2014*; 1:30 pm	vs. Morgan State; Cancún Challenge	W 74–73	2–2	Hard Rock Hotel Riviera Maya (560); Cancún, MX
November 26, 2014*; 4:00 pm	vs. North Florida; Cancún Challenge	L 64–72	2–3	Hard Rock Hotel Riviera Maya (540); Cancún, MX
November 30, 2014*; 1:30 pm	at Miami (OH); Cancún Challenge	W 70–68	3–3	Millett Hall (641); Oxford, Ohio
December 2, 2014*; 7:00 pm	VU of Lynchburg	W 111–55	4–3	Alumni Gym (1,132); Elon, North Carolina
December 7, 2014*; 2:00 pm	Central Pennsylvania	W 117–73	5–3	Alumni Gym (1,117); Elon, North Carolina
December 11, 2014*; 7:00 pm, SECN	at Missouri	L 73–78	5–4	Mizzou Arena (4,514); Columbia, Missouri
December 15, 2014*; 7:00 pm, ESPNU	at No. 2 Duke	L 63–75	5–5	Cameron Indoor Stadium (9,314); Durham, North Carolina
December 20, 2014*; 2:00 pm	at UNC Greensboro	W 71–64	6–5	Greensboro Coliseum (1,939); Greensboro, North Carolina
December 22, 2014*; 3:00 pm, ESPN3	at Kennesaw State	W 67–65	7–5	KSU Convocation Center (1,219); Kennesaw, Georgia
December 28, 2014*; 2:00 pm	Marist	W 69–64	8–5	Alumni Gym (1,282); Elon, North Carolina
January 3, 2015; 4:00 pm	at Drexel	W 77–67	9–5 (1–0)	Daskalakis Athletic Center (1,061); Philadelphia
January 5, 2015; 7:00 pm	at Towson	L 53–57	9–6 (1–1)	SECU Arena (1,274); Towson, Maryland
January 8, 2015; 8:00 pm, ASN	William & Mary	W 85–79	10–6 (2–1)	Alumni Gym (1,384); Elon, North Carolina
January 10, 2015; 8:00 pm, ASN	Hofstra	L 61–79	10–7 (2–2)	Alumni Gym (1,493); Elon, North Carolina
January 14, 2015; 7:00 pm	College of Charleston	L 50–66	10–8 (2–3)	Alumni Gym (1,235); Elon, North Carolina
January 17, 2015; 8:00 pm, ASN	at James Madison	L 72–75	10–9 (2–4)	JMU Convocation Center (3,197); Harrisonburg, Virginia
January 22, 2015; 7:00 pm	Towson	L 51–53	10–10 (2–5)	Alumni Gym (1,141); Elon, North Carolina
January 24, 2015; 7:00 pm	Delaware	W 94–82	11–10 (3–5)	Alumni Gym (1,711); Elon, North Carolina
January 28, 2015; 7:00 pm	at UNC Wilmington	L 65–82	11–11 (3–6)	Trask Coliseum (4,419); Wilmington, North Carolina
January 31, 2015; 7:00 pm	at Northeastern	L 61–80	11–12 (3–7)	Matthews Arena (1,171); Boston
February 05, 2015; 7:00 pm	Drexel	L 63–67	11–13 (3–8)	Alumni Gym (1,184); Elon, North Carolina
February 7, 2015; 7:00 pm	at Hofstra	L 69–80	11–14 (3–9)	Mack Sports Complex (2,017); Hempstead, New York
February 11, 2015; 7:00 pm	at William & Mary	L 58–77	11–15 (3–10)	Kaplan Arena (2,735); Williamsburg, Virginia
February 14, 2015; 7:00 pm	James Madison	L 75–86	11–16 (3–11)	Alumni Gym (1,377); Elon, North Carolina
February 18, 2015; 7:00 pm	at College of Charleston	L 63–77	11–17 (3–12)	TD Arena (1,729); Charleston, South Carolina
February 21, 2015; 12:30 pm, ASN	at Delaware	W 83–75 ^{OT}	12–17 (4–12)	Bob Carpenter Center (2,890); Newark, Delaware
February 26, 2015; 7:00 pm	Northeastern	W 72–65	13–17 (5–12)	Alumni Gym (1,016); Elon, North Carolina
February 28, 2015; 7:00 pm	UNC Wilmington	W 74–55	14–17 (6–12)	Alumni Gym (1,876); Elon, North Carolina
CAA tournament
March 6, 2015; 6:00 pm	vs. Towson; First round	W 74–69 ^{OT}	15–17	Royal Farms Arena (2,552); Baltimore
March 7, 2015; 12:00 pm, CSN	vs. William & Mary; Quarterfinals	L 59–72	15–18	Royal Farms Arena (3,762); Baltimore
*Non-conference game. ^{#}Rankings from AP Poll. (#) Tournament seedings in parentheses. All times are in Eastern Time.

== See also ==
2014–15 Elon Phoenix women's basketball team
