= 2014–15 James Madison Dukes men's basketball team =

American college basketball season

2014–15 James Madison Dukes men's basketball

CAA regular season co–champions

CIT, First round
- Conference: Colonial Athletic Association
- Record: 19–14 (12–6 CAA)
- Head coach: Matt Brady (7th season)
- Assistant coaches: Rob O'Driscoll; Mike Deane; Bill Phillips
- Home arena: JMU Convocation Center

2014–15 CAA men's basketball standings
	Conf.				Overall
Team	W		L	PCT	W		L	PCT
William & Mary	12	–	6	.667	20	–	13	.606
UNC Wilmington	12	–	6	.667	18	–	14	.563
Northeastern †	12	–	6	.667	23	–	12	.657
James Madison	12	–	6	.667	19	–	14	.576
Hofstra	10	–	8	.556	20	–	14	.588
Delaware	9	–	9	.500	10	–	20	.333
Drexel	9	–	9	.500	11	–	19	.367
Elon	6	–	12	.333	15	–	18	.455
Towson	5	–	13	.278	12	–	20	.375
College of Charleston	3	–	15	.167	9	–	24	.273
† 2015 CAA tournament winner Rankings from AP poll

The 2014–15 James Madison Dukes men's basketball team represented James Madison University during the 2014–15 NCAA Division I men's basketball season. The Dukes, led by seventh year head coach Matt Brady, played their home games at the James Madison University Convocation Center and were members of the Colonial Athletic Association. They finished the season 19–14, 12–6 in CAA play to finish in a four way tie for the CAA regular season championship. They lost in the quarterfinals of the CAA tournament to Hofstra. They were invited to the CollegeInsider.com Tournament where they lost in the first round to USC Upstate.

== Previous season ==
The Dukes finished the season 11–20, 6–10 in CAA play to finish in a tie for sixth place. They lost in the quarterfinals of the CAA tournament to Towson.

== Departures ==
Name	Number	Pos.	Height	Weight	Year	Hometown	Notes
Charles Cooke	4	G	6'6"	190	Sophomore	Trenton, New Jersey	Transferred to Dayton
Andrey Semenov	11	F	6'7"	200	Senior	Saint Petersburg, Russia	Graduated
Christian Pierce	14	G	6'5"	205	RS Junior	Ivy, Virginia	Transferred
Tom Rivard	20	F	6'7"	205	Freshman	Worcester, Massachusetts	Transferred to Colgate
Taylor Bessick	22	F	6'9"	230	Sophomore	Philadelphia	Transferred to Iona

== Incoming transfers ==
Name	Number	Pos.	Height	Weight	Year	Hometown	Notes
Devontae Morgan	0	G	6'3"	176	Junior	Tampa, Florida	Transferred from Butler
Winston Grays III	3	G	6'2"	170	Junior	Cleveland, Ohio	Transferred from Cincinnati State

- Under NCAA transfer rules, Devonte Morgan will have to redshirt for the 2014–15 season. Will have two years of remaining eligibility.

== Recruiting ==
College recruiting information
Name	Hometown	School	Height	Weight	Commit date
Dante Sterling; SG	Fayetteville, Georgia	Fayette County High School	6 ft 5 in (1.96 m)	175 lb (79 kg)	Oct 3, 2013
Dante Sterling; SG	Recruit ratings: Scout: Rivals: (NR)				
Hari Hall; SF	Jacksonville, Florida	Ribault High School	6 ft 7 in (2.01 m)	210 lb (95 kg)	Oct 17, 2013
Hari Hall; SF	Recruit ratings: Scout: Rivals: (NR)				
Joey McLean; PG	High Point, North Carolina	High Point Christian Academy	6 ft 0 in (1.83 m)	170 lb (77 kg)	May 7, 2014
Joey McLean; PG	Recruit ratings: Scout: Rivals: (NR)				
Overall recruit ranking:
Note: In many cases, Scout, Rivals, 247Sports, On3, and ESPN may conflict in their listings of height and weight.; In these cases, the average was taken. ESPN grades are on a 100-point scale.; Sources: "2014 Team Ranking". Rivals.

== Roster ==
2014–15 James Madison Dukes men's basketball team
Players
Coaches

Pos.	#	Name	Height	Weight	Year	Hometown
G	0	Devontae Morgan (redshirt)	6 ft 4 in (1.93 m)	180 lb (82 kg)	Jr	Tampa, Florida
G	1	Shawn Wilborne (W)	6 ft 2 in (1.88 m)	195 lb (88 kg)	RS So	Fredericksburg, Virginia
G	2	Ron Curry	6 ft 4 in (1.93 m)	190 lb (86 kg)	Jr	Pennsauken, New Jersey
G	3	Winston Grays	6 ft 2 in (1.88 m)	175 lb (79 kg)	Jr	Cleveland, Ohio
G	4	Joey McLean	6 ft 0 in (1.83 m)	160 lb (73 kg)	Fr	Greensboro, North Carolina
G	10	Jackson Kent	6 ft 7 in (2.01 m)	185 lb (84 kg)	So	High Point, North Carolina
G	11	Dante Sterling	6 ft 5 in (1.96 m)	205 lb (93 kg)	Fr	Fayetteville, Georgia
F	12	Paulius Satkus	6 ft 8 in (2.03 m)	215 lb (98 kg)	So	Raudondvaris, Lithuania
F	13	Tom Vodanovich	6 ft 8 in (2.03 m)	220 lb (100 kg)	So	Wellington, New Zealand
G	15	Andre Nation (S)	6 ft 5 in (1.96 m)	200 lb (91 kg)	Jr	Plant City, Florida
F	21	Dimitrije Cabarkapa	6 ft 10 in (2.08 m)	240 lb (109 kg)	RS So	Novi Sad, Serbia
F	25	Hari Hall	6 ft 7 in (2.01 m)	210 lb (95 kg)	Fr	Jacksonville, Florida
G	35	Matt Risse (W)	6 ft 5 in (1.96 m)	195 lb (88 kg)	Fr	Barrington, New Jersey
G	40	Yohanny Dalembert	6 ft 8 in (2.03 m)	225 lb (102 kg)	So	Port-au-Prince, Haiti
F	55	Ivan Lukic	6 ft 8 in (2.03 m)	220 lb (100 kg)	So	Loznica, Serbia

Head coach

- Matt Brady (Siena)

Assistant coach(es)

- Rob O'Driscoll (Villanova)
- Mike Deane (SUNY Potsdam)
- Bill Phillips (Saint Joseph's)

Legend

- (C) Team captain
- (S) Suspended
- (I) Ineligible
- (W) Walk-on
- Injured
- Current redshirt

Roster
Last update: 2013-08-01

== Schedule ==
Date time, TV	Opponent	Result	Record	Site (attendance) city, state
Exhibition
11/02/2014*; 2:00 pm	Philadelphia	L 76–79		JMU Convocation Center; Harrisonburg, Virginia
Regular season
11/14/2014*; 7:00 pm	No. 9 Virginia	L 51–79	0–1	JMU Convocation Center (6,782); Harrisonburg, Virginia
11/17/2014*; 7:00 pm	Radford	W 74–71	1–1	JMU Convocation Center (2,729); Harrisonburg, Virginia
11/19/2014*; 7:00 pm	Longwood	W 82–60	2–1	JMU Convocation Center (2,877); Harrisonburg, Virginia
11/24/2014*; 7:00 pm	Colgate; Buckeye Classic	W 77–71	3–1	JMU Convocation Center (2,623); Harrisonburg, Virginia
11/26/2014*; 2:00 pm	Sacred Heart; Buckeye Classic	W 79–72	4–1	JMU Convocation Center (2,548); Harrisonburg, Virginia
11/28/2014*; 4:00 pm, BTN	at No. 16 Ohio State; Buckeye Classic	L 56–73	4–2	Value City Arena (14,310); Columbus, Ohio
12/02/2014*; 7:00 pm	Campbell; Buckeye Classic	W 63–61	5–2	JMU Convocation Center (2,631); Harrisonburg, Virginia
12/07/2014*; 2:00 pm	Richmond	W 51–46	6–2	JMU Convocation Center (3,537); Harrisonburg, Virginia
12/13/2014*; 5:00 pm, ESPN3	at East Carolina	L 58–70	6–3	Williams Arena (4,759); Greenville, North Carolina
12/17/2014*; 7:00 pm	at Ball State	W 72–52	7–3	John E. Worthen Arena (2,257); Muncie, Indiana
12/20/2014*; 5:00 pm	High Point	L 71–80	7–4	JMU Convocation Center (3,661); Harrisonburg, Virginia
12/22/2014*; 7:00 pm	Norfolk State	L 71–74 ^{OT}	7–5	JMU Convocation Center (2,864); Harrisonburg, Virginia
12/29/2014*; 7:00 pm	Valparaiso	L 52–79	7–6	JMU Convocation Center (2,757); Harrisonburg, Virginia
01/03/2015; 4:00 pm	Towson	W 61–52	8–6 (1–0)	JMU Convocation Center (2,731); Harrisonburg, Virginia
01/05/2015; 7:30 pm	at College of Charleston	W 61–50	9–6 (2–0)	TD Arena (1,865); Charleston, South Carolina
01/08/2015; 7:00 pm	Northeastern	L 59–65	9–7 (2–1)	JMU Convocation Center (2,589); Harrisonburg, Virginia
01/10/2015; 4:00 pm	at William & Mary	L 73–81	9–8 (2–2)	Kaplan Arena (3,446); Williamsburg, Virginia
01/15/2015; 7:00 pm, CSN	at Drexel	W 54–35	10–8 (3–2)	Daskalakis Athletic Center (1,186); Philadelphia
01/17/2015; 8:00 pm, ASN	Elon	W 75–72	11–8 (4–2)	JMU Convocation Center (3,197); Harrisonburg, Virginia
01/22/2015; 7:00 pm	at Northeastern	L 59–82	11–9 (4–3)	Matthews Arena (1,680); Boston
01/24/2015; 4:00 pm	at Hofstra	W 69–63	12–9 (5–3)	Mack Sports Complex (2,826); Hempstead, New York
01/28/2015; 7:00 pm	Delaware	W 88–82	13–9 (6–3)	JMU Convocation Center (2,806); Harrisonburg, Virginia
01/31/2015; 4:00 pm, CSN	William & Mary	L 65–84	13–10 (6–4)	JMU Convocation Center (4,133); Harrisonburg, Virginia
02/04/2015; 7:00 pm	UNC Wilmington	L 65–77	13–11 (6–5)	JMU Convocation Center (3,323); Harrisonburg, Virginia
02/07/2015; 2:00 pm, CSN	at Towson	W 63–61	14–11 (7–5)	SECU Arena (3,847); Towson, Maryland
02/10/2015; 8:00 pm, CSN	at Delaware	W 67–54	15–11 (8–5)	Bob Carpenter Center (2,318); Newark, Delaware
02/14/2015; 7:00 pm	at Elon	W 86–75	16–11 (9–5)	Alumni Gym (1,377); Elon, North Carolina
02/18/2015; 7:00 pm	Drexel	W 82–78	17–11 (10–5)	JMU Convocation Center (3,282); Harrisonburg, Virginia
02/22/2015; 12:00 pm, CSN	College of Charleston; Postponed from 02/21/2015	W 68–61	18–11 (11–5)	JMU Convocation Center (3,652); Harrisonburg, Virginia
02/25/2015; 7:00 pm	at UNC Wilmington	L 54–74	18–12 (11–6)	Trask Coliseum (4,542); Wilmington, North Carolina
02/28/2015; 4:00 pm, CSN	Hofstra	W 82–73	19–12 (12–6)	JMU Convocation Center (6,185); Harrisonburg, Virginia
CAA tournament
03/07/2015; 2:30 pm, CSN	vs. Hofstra; Quarterfinals	L 57–74	19–13	Royal Farms Arena (3,762); Baltimore
CIT
03/17/2015*; 7:00 pm, ESPN3	at USC Upstate; First round	L 72–73	19–14	Hodge Center (711); Spartanburg, South Carolina
*Non-conference game. ^{#}Rankings from AP Poll. (#) Tournament seedings in parentheses. All times are in Eastern Time.

== See also ==
- 2014–15 James Madison Dukes women's basketball team
