= 2014–15 Drexel Dragons men's basketball team =

American college basketball season

2014–15 Drexel Dragons men's basketball
- Conference: Colonial Athletic Association
- Record: 11–19 (9–9 CAA)
- Head coach: Bruiser Flint (14th season)
- Assistant coaches: Mike Connors (7th season); Matt Collier (5th season); Bobby Jordan (3rd season)
- MVP: Damion Lee
- Home arena: Daskalakis Athletic Center

2014–15 CAA men's basketball standings
	Conf.				Overall
Team	W		L	PCT	W		L	PCT
William & Mary	12	–	6	.667	20	–	13	.606
UNC Wilmington	12	–	6	.667	18	–	14	.563
Northeastern †	12	–	6	.667	23	–	12	.657
James Madison	12	–	6	.667	19	–	14	.576
Hofstra	10	–	8	.556	20	–	14	.588
Delaware	9	–	9	.500	10	–	20	.333
Drexel	9	–	9	.500	11	–	19	.367
Elon	6	–	12	.333	15	–	18	.455
Towson	5	–	13	.278	12	–	20	.375
College of Charleston	3	–	15	.167	9	–	24	.273
† 2015 CAA tournament winner Rankings from AP poll

The 2014–15 Drexel Dragons men's basketball team represented Drexel University during the 2014–15 NCAA Division I men's basketball season. The Dragons, led by 14th year head coach Bruiser Flint, played their home games at the Daskalakis Athletic Center and were members of the Colonial Athletic Association.

They finished the season 11–19, 9–9 in CAA play to finish in a tie for sixth place. They lost in the first round of the CAA tournament to the College of Charleston.

== Previous season ==
The 2013–14 Drexel Dragons finished the season with a record of 18-16 after losing to Northeastern in the 2014 CAA men's basketball tournament. The team went 8–8 in the CAA regular season, and was the 4 seed in the conference tournament.

== Off season ==
=== Departures ===
Name	Number	Pos.	Height	Weight	Year	Hometown	Notes
Chris Fouch	3	SG	6'2"	185	Graduate	New York City	Graduated, signed by BK Iskra Svit
Frantz Massenat	4	PG	6'4"	185	Senior	Ewing, New Jersey	Graduated, signed by Mitteldeutscher BC
Stevan Manojlovic	5	SG	6'5"	197	Senior	Toronto	Graduated, committed to Western Ontario
Goran Pantovic	13	PF/C	6'10"	225	Senior	Belgrade, Serbia	Graduated, signed by Nässjö Basket (Ligan)
Khris Lane	21	PF	6'6"	215	Freshman	Richmond, Virginia	Transferred to Longwood University
Jake Lerner	22	SG	6'2"	190	Senior	Philadelphia	Graduated
Dartaye Ruffin	35	PF	6'8"	250	Senior	Stoughton, Massachusetts	Graduated, signed by Nässjö Basket (Ligan)

=== Incoming transfers ===
College recruiting information
Name	Hometown	School	Height	Weight	Commit date
Ahmad Fields; SG	Washington, D.C.	University of Utah	6 ft 5 in (1.96 m)	190 lb (86 kg)	Apr 22, 2014
Ahmad Fields; SG	Recruit ratings: Scout: Rivals: 247Sports: ESPN: (67)				
Sooren Derboghosian; C	Tehran, Iran	UCLA	6 ft 10 in (2.08 m)	240 lb (110 kg)	Jun 15, 2014
Sooren Derboghosian; C	Recruit ratings: No ratings found				
Overall recruit ranking:
Note: In many cases, Scout, Rivals, 247Sports, On3, and ESPN may conflict in their listings of height and weight.; In these cases, the average was taken. ESPN grades are on a 100-point scale.; Sources: "Drexel 2014 Basketball Commitments". Rivals.; "Drexel Dragons". ESPN.; "2014 Team Ranking". Rivals.

- Ahmad Fields is not eligible to play in the 2014–15 season due to NCAA transfer rules. Fields will redshirt and enter the 2015–16 season as a redshirt sophomore with 3 years of eligibility remaining.

=== 2014 Recruiting Class ===
College recruiting information
Name	Hometown	School	Height	Weight	Commit date
Rashann London; SG	Philadelphia	Roman Catholic HS	6 ft 2 in (1.88 m)	180 lb (82 kg)	Aug 22, 2013
Rashann London; SG	Recruit ratings: No ratings found				
Sammy Mojica; SG	Chestnut Hill, Massachusetts	Brimmer and May School	6 ft 3 in (1.91 m)	160 lb (73 kg)	Aug 28, 2013
Sammy Mojica; SG	Recruit ratings: Rivals:				
Tyshawn Myles; PF	Bronx, New York	Washington Heights Expeditionary Learning School	6 ft 8 in (2.03 m)	260 lb (120 kg)	Nov 4, 2013
Tyshawn Myles; PF	Recruit ratings: No ratings found				
Austin Williams; PF	Richmond, Virginia	Trinity Episcopal HS	6 ft 7 in (2.01 m)	215 lb (98 kg)	May 2, 2014
Austin Williams; PF	Recruit ratings: No ratings found				
Overall recruit ranking:
Note: In many cases, Scout, Rivals, 247Sports, On3, and ESPN may conflict in their listings of height and weight.; In these cases, the average was taken. ESPN grades are on a 100-point scale.; Sources: "Drexel 2014 Basketball Commitments". Rivals.; "Drexel Dragons". ESPN.; "2014 Team Ranking". Rivals.

== Roster ==
2014–15 Drexel Dragons men's basketball team
Players
Coaches

Pos.	#	Name	Height	Weight	Year	Previous school	Hometown
C	0	Sooren Derboghosian (injured)	6 ft 10 in (2.08 m)	255 lb (116 kg)	RS Sr	Glendale CC	Tehran, Iran
G	1	Freddie Wilson	6 ft 3 in (1.91 m)	204 lb (93 kg)	Sr	Hillhouse HS	New Haven, Connecticut
G	2	Sammy Mojica (injured)	6 ft 3 in (1.91 m)	175 lb (79 kg)	Fr	Brimmer and May School	Chestnut Hill, Massachusetts
F	5	Austin Williams	6 ft 8 in (2.03 m)	230 lb (104 kg)	Fr	Trinity Episcopal HS	Richmond, Virginia
G/F	11	Tavon Allen	6 ft 7 in (2.01 m)	190 lb (86 kg)	RS Jr	Hillhouse HS	New Haven, Connecticut
G	13	Rashann London	6 ft 2 in (1.88 m)	175 lb (79 kg)	Fr	Roman Catholic HS	Philadelphia
G/F	14	Damion Lee (injured)	6 ft 6 in (1.98 m)	200 lb (91 kg)	RS Jr	Calvert Hall HS	Baltimore
F/C	15	Mohamed Bah	6 ft 9 in (2.06 m)	225 lb (102 kg)	So	Lee Academy (ME)	Bamako, Mali
F	24	Rodney Williams	6 ft 7 in (2.01 m)	220 lb (100 kg)	So	St. Christopher's School (VA)	Richmond, Virginia
G	25	Major Canady (injured) (redshirt)	6 ft 4 in (1.93 m)	200 lb (91 kg)	So	The Kiski School (PA)	Wilson, North Carolina
F	32	Kazembe Abif (injured) (redshirt)	6 ft 7 in (2.01 m)	215 lb (98 kg)	Sr	University HS (NJ)	Elizabeth, New Jersey
F	55	Tyshawn Myles	6 ft 8 in (2.03 m)	245 lb (111 kg)	Fr	Washington Heights	Queens, New York
G		Ahmad Fields (I) (redshirt)	6 ft 5 in (1.96 m)	195 lb (88 kg)	So	Massanutten Academy	Washington, D.C.

Head coach

- Bruiser Flint (Saint Joseph's)

Assistant coach(es)

- Mike Connors (Ithaca)
- Matt Collier (UMass)
- Bobby Jordan (Drexel)

Legend

- (C) Team captain
- (S) Suspended
- (I) Ineligible
- (W) Walk-on
- Injured
- Current redshirt

Roster

- On April 15, 2014, Drexel announced that senior forward Kazembe Abif would miss the entire 2014–15 season due to a right ACL injury. Abif also missed a large part of the previous season due to a variety of injuries, including a fractured hand. Abif redshirted the season and retained one year of eligibility entering the 2015–16 season.
- On October 31, 2014, Drexel announced that sophomore point guard Major Canady would miss the 2014–15 season due to a right ankle injury. Canady redshirted the season and retained 3 years of eligibility remaining entering the 2015–16 season.
- On November 19, 2014, Drexel announced that freshman forward Austin Williams was expected to miss "approximately 6-8 weeks due to a left foot injury." He recorded 6 rebounds in the team's season opener against Colorado and sat out the following game before the injury was announced. Williams returned earlier than expected on January 3, 2015.
- On December 28, 2014, it was reported that redshirt senior Sooren Derboghosian suffered a major knee injury that would require surgery, and would miss the remainder of the season.
- On December 29, 2014, forward Rodney Williams tweeted that he suffered a stress fracture in his foot, and would miss the next 4–6 weeks. He returned on January 28, 2015 against Northeastern.
- On February 22, 2015, the school announced that redshirt junior Damion Lee suffered a fractured right hand the previous day in a game against Northeastern, and would miss the rest of the season.
- On February 26, 2015, the school announced that freshman guard Sammy Mojica suffered a sprained MCL in practice earlier in the week, and would miss the remainder of the season.

=== Depth chart ===
Pos.	Starting 5	Bench 1	Bench 2
C	Mohamed Bah	Sooren Derboghosian	Tyshawn Myles
PF	Kazembe Abif	Rodney Williams	Austin Williams
SF	Tavon Allen	Sammy Mojica
SG	Damion Lee	Rashaan London
PG	Major Canady	Freddie Wilson

== Schedule ==
Date time, TV	Rank^{#}	Opponent^{#}	Result	Record	High points	High rebounds	High assists	Site (attendance) city, state
Exhibition
August 26, 2014*		at Beijing Univ. of Tech.	W 85–79		30 – Allen	–	–	BJUT Gymnasium; Beijing, China
August 28, 2014*		at Beijing Sport Univ.	W 65–60		16 – R. Williams	–	–	BSU Gymnasium; Beijing, China
August 30, 2014*		at Jiao Tong University	W 82–49		21 – Wilson	–	–	SJTU Sports Arena; Shanghai, China
September 1, 2014*		at Shanghai Sharks	L 56–65		–	–	–	Practice Facility; Shanghai, China
November 1, 2014*		at George Washington	L 49–95		–	–	–	Charles E. Smith Center; Washington, D.C.
November 8, 2014*		at Temple	W 64–61		–	–	–	Liacouras Center; Philadelphia
Non-conference regular season
November 14, 2014*; 8:00 pm, P12N		at Colorado	L 48–65	0–1	16 – Allen	7 – R. Williams	2 – Tied	Coors Events Center (10,058); Boulder, Colorado
November 17, 2014*; 7:00 pm		Saint Joseph's	L 49–52	0–2	23 – Lee	8 – R. Williams	2 – Tied	Daskalakis Athletic Center (2,509); Philadelphia
November 20, 2014*; 3:00 pm, ESPNU		vs. Miami (FL); Charleston Classic Quarterfinals	L 46–66	0–3	13 – Allen	8 – R. Williams	2 – Lee	TD Arena (1,131); Charleston, South Carolina
November 21, 2014*; 12:00 pm, ESPNU		vs. USC; Charleston Classic consolation round	L 70–72	0–4	32 – Lee	8 – Bah	8 – Allen	TD Arena (855); Charleston, South Carolina
November 23, 2014*; 1:30 pm, ESPN3		vs. Cornell; Charleston Classic 7th place game	W 61–59	1–4	28 – Lee	14 – R. Williams	3 – Lee	TD Arena (1,220); Charleston, South Carolina
November 30, 2014*; 5:00 pm		Southern Miss	W 59–36	2–4	22 – Lee	10 – Myles	4 – Myles	Daskalakis Athletic Center (1,092); Philadelphia
December 4, 2014*; 7:00 pm		USciences	L 52–54	2–5	17 – Lee	10 – R. Williams	2 – Tied	Daskalakis Athletic Center (1,181); Philadelphia
December 13, 2014*; 1:00 pm		La Salle	L 55–65	2–6	19 – Lee	11 – R. Williams	3 – Lee	Daskalakis Athletic Center (1,613); Philadelphia
December 16, 2014*; 7:00 pm, ESPN3		at Buffalo	L 70–80	2–7	24 – Lee	6 – Tied	4 – Lee	Alumni Arena (2,402); Buffalo, New York
December 20, 2014*; 2:00 pm, ESPN3		vs. Penn State	L 68–73	2–8	15 – Allen	8 – Tied	3 – Lee	PPL Center (4,914); Allentown, Pennsylvania
December 28, 2014*; 1:00 pm		Iona	L 62–81	2–9	18 – Tied	9 – R. Williams	6 – Wilson	Daskalakis Athletic Center (1,101); Philadelphia
CAA Regular Season
January 3, 2015; 4:00 pm		Elon	L 67–77	2–10 (0–1)	29 – Lee	6 – Tied	6 – Lee	Daskalakis Athletic Center (1,061); Philadelphia
January 5, 2015; 7:00 pm		William & Mary	L 47–73	2–11 (0–2)	18 – Lee	7 – Lee	3 – Tied	Daskalakis Athletic Center (1,051); Philadelphia
January 8, 2015; 7:00 pm		at Towson	W 55–41	3–11 (1–2)	16 – Lee	7 – Lee	3 – Mojica	SECU Arena (1,285); Towson, Maryland
January 10, 2015; 7:00 pm		at UNC Wilmington	L 57–64	3–12 (1–3)	32 – Lee	8 – Lee	4 – Mojica	Trask Coliseum (3,643); Wilmington, North Carolina
January 15, 2015; 7:00 pm, TCN		James Madison	L 35–54	3–13 (1–4)	14 – Lee	7 – Bah	3 – Mojica	Daskalakis Athletic Center (1,186); Philadelphia
January 17, 2015; 4:00 pm, CSN		at Delaware	W 66–62	4–13 (2–4)	17 – Lee	11 – Tied	4 – Lee	Bob Carpenter Center (3,275); Newark, Delaware
January 21, 2015; 7:00 pm		at Hofstra	L 58–86	4–14 (2–5)	27 – Lee	7 – Tied	4 – Allen	Mack Sports Complex (1,020); Hempstead, New York
January 24, 2015; 12:00 pm, NBCSN		College of Charleston	W 53–51	5–14 (3–5)	21 – Lee	5 – Tied	3 – Tied	Daskalakis Athletic Center (1,343); Philadelphia
January 28, 2015; 7:00 pm		Northeastern	W 65–60	6–14 (4–5)	33 – Lee	7 – Myles	3 – Tied	Daskalakis Athletic Center (1,011); Philadelphia
January 31, 2015; 4:00 pm		UNC Wilmington	L 76–85	7–14 (5–5)	32 – Lee	13 – Lee	5 – Allen	Daskalakis Athletic Center (1,404); Philadelphia
February 5, 2015; 7:00 pm		at Elon	W 67–63	8–14 (6–5)	16 – Lee	9 – Bah	5 – Lee	Alumni Gym (1,184); Elon, North Carolina
February 7, 2015; 5:00 pm		at College of Charleston	W 59–45	9–14 (7–5)	18 – Allen	6 – Mojica	5 – Allen	TD Arena (3,769); Charleston, South Carolina
February 10, 2015; 6:00 pm, TCN		Towson	W 53–49	10–14 (8–5)	23 – Lee	6 – Bah	3 – Allen	Daskalakis Athletic Center (1,301); Philadelphia
February 15, 2015; 5:00 pm, TCN		Hofstra	L 57–81	10–15 (8–6)	20 – Allen	5 – Tied	2 – Allen	Daskalakis Athletic Center (1,501); Philadelphia
February 18, 2015; 7:00 pm		at James Madison	L 78–82	10–16 (8–7)	26 – Lee	6 – Tied	6 – London	JMU Convocation Center (3,282); Harrisonburg, Virginia
February 21, 2015; 4:00 pm, NBCSN		at Northeastern	L 73–83 ^{OT}	10–17 (8–8)	30 – Lee	8 – R. Williams	4 – Mojica	Matthews Arena (1,925); Boston
February 26, 2015; 7:00 pm, TCN		Delaware	L 44–58	10–18 (8–9)	12 – Wilson	12 – R. Williams	5 – Wilson	Daskalakis Athletic Center (1,689); Philadelphia
February 28, 2015; 2:00 pm, TCN		at William & Mary	W 80–66	11–18 (9–9)	24 – Wilson	9 – R. Williams	4 – Tied	Kaplan Arena (5,312); Williamsburg, Virginia
CAA Tournament
March 6, 2015; 8:30 pm	(7)	vs. (10) College of Charleston; First round	L 48–56	11–19	17 – Wilson	8 – R. Williams	2 – R. Williams	Royal Farms Arena (2,552); Baltimore
*Non-conference game. ^{#}Rankings from AP. (#) Tournament seedings in parentheses. All times are in Eastern Time.

== Team statistics ==
As of the end of the season.
Indicates team leader in each category.

(FG%, FT% leader = minimum 50 att.; 3P% leader = minimum 20 att.)

Player	GP	GS	MPG	PPG	RPG	APG	SPG	BPG	TPG	FG%	FT%	3P%
Tavon Allen	29	27	32.8	11.2	3.0	2.3	0.8	0.6	2.1	.315	.800	.283
Mohamed Bah	30	30	21.9	3.9	4.6	0.5	0.5	0.6	0.8	.545	.805	.000
Sooren Derboghosian	8	0	6.6	1.8	1.8	0.0	0.0	0.0	0.6	.667	.667	.000
Damion Lee	27	27	38.1	21.4	6.1	2.3	1.5	0.3	1.9	.438	.887	.385
Rashaan London	30	30	30.3	7.0	2.1	1.6	0.7	0.1	1.8	.376	.634	.269
Sammy Mojica	24	4	24.7	6.3	2.9	1.7	1.0	0.1	1.1	.393	.464	.369
Tyshawn Myles	27	0	11.6	1.6	3.4	0.2	0.1	0.5	0.3	.386	.500	.000
Austin Williams	20	12	10.6	0.5	1.7	0.3	0.2	0.4	0.3	.400	.200	.000
Rodney Williams	22	14	30.5	8.2	7.0	1.3	0.4	1.5	1.7	.433	.591	.000
Freddie Wilson	30	6	21.2	5.3	1.5	1.5	0.6	0.1	1.2	.331	.615	.303
Team	30	-	-	60	32	11	5	4	10	.391	.745	.326

== Awards ==
Damion Lee

- Team Most Valuable Player
- First Team NABC All-District Team
- CAA All-Conference First Team
- CAA All-Defensive Team
- CAA All-Academic Team
- CAA Player of the Week (2)
- Charleston Classic All-Tournament Team
- Preseason CAA All-Conference First Team

Tavon Allen

- Assist Award (team leader in assists)
- Dragon "D" Award (team's top defensive player)
- Preseason CAA All-Conference Team Honorable Mention

Rodney Williams

- "Sweep" Award (team leader in blocks)
- CAA All-Academic Team
- Team Academic Award
- Donald Shank Spirit & Dedication Award

Sammy Mojica

- Samuel D. Cozen Award (most improved player)
- CAA Rookie of the Week

Tyshawn Myles

- CAA Rookie of the Week

== See also ==
2014–15 Drexel Dragons women's basketball team
