= T. J. Williams (basketball) =

American basketball player (born 1994)

Personal information
- Born: October 26, 1994 (age 32)
- Listed height: 6 ft 3 in (1.91 m)
- Listed weight: 205 lb (93 kg)

Career information
- High school: Pflugerville (Pflugerville, Texas)
- College: Northeastern (2013–2017)
- NBA draft: 2017: undrafted
- Playing career: 2017–2022
- Position: Point guard

Career history
- 2017–2018: Greensboro Swarm
- 2018: Santeros de Aguada
- 2018–2019: Oostende
- 2019–2020: Hapoel Be'er Sheva
- 2020–2021: Vanoli Cremona
- 2021: Maccabi Rishon LeZion
- 2021–2022: Gießen 46ers

Career highlights
- Belgian League champion (2019); Honorable mention All-American – AP (2017); CAA Player of the Year (2017); First-team All-CAA (2017); CAA All-Rookie Team (2014)
- Stats at Basketball Reference

T. J. Williams (born October 26, 1994) is an American former basketball player who last played for Gießen 46ers of the Basketball Bundesliga. He played in college for Northeastern University before playing professionally in the NBA G League, Puerto Rico, Belgium and Israel.

== College career ==
For his first three years at Northeastern, he played a supporting role behind Quincy Ford and David Walker. In his senior year, he was named CAA Player of the Year. Williams led the conference in scoring at 21.6 points per game and was second in Division I in minutes per game with 38.1. He had a career-high 33 points against CAA regular-season champ UNC-Wilmington on February 16.

== Professional career ==
=== Greensboro Swarm (2017–2018) ===
After going undrafted in the 2017 NBA draft, Williams was signed by the Charlotte Hornets to their training camp roster on August 2, 2017, but was released on October 13 as one of the team's final preseason roster cuts. Ten days later, he signed with the Greensboro Swarm of the NBA G League as an affiliate player, playing in 37 games and averaging 8.8 points, 2.5 rebounds and 2.8 assists in 19.2 minutes.

=== Santeros de Aguada (2018) ===
On May 18, 2018, Williams signed with Santeros de Aguada of the Puerto Rican BSN. Three days later, Williams recorded a career-high 24 points in his debut, along with four rebounds and seven assists in a 123–116 loss to Capitanes de Arecibo.

=== Oostende (2018–2019) ===
On July 5, 2018, Williams signed a two-year contract with Oostende of the Belgian Pro Basketball League. On January 22, 2019, Williams recorded a season-high 21 points, shooting 7-of-14 from the field, along with three rebounds in an 82–62 win over Medi Bayreuth. In 49 games played for Oostende, he averaged 11.3 points, 2.3 rebounds and 2.8 assists per game. Williams won the 2019 Belgian League Championship with Oostende, as well as reaching the 2019 FIBA Europe Cup Quarterfinals, where they eventually were eliminated by Pallacanestro Varese.

=== Hapoel Be'er Sheva (2019–2020) ===
On July 8, 2019, Williams signed a one-year deal with Hapoel Be'er Sheva of the Israeli Premier League. On October 12, 2019, Williams tied his career-high 24 points in his second game with Be'er Sheva. He shot 9-of-15 from the field, along with four assists in a 69–75 loss to Maccabi Rishon LeZion. He averaged 18.8 points, 2.8 rebounds and 4.8 assists per game in Winner League.

=== Vanoli Cremona (2020–2021) ===
On August 10, 2020, Williams signed a one-year deal with Vanoli Cremona of the Italian Lega Basket Serie A (LBA).

=== Maccabi Rishon LeZion (2021) ===
On August 8, 2021, he has signed with Maccabi Rishon LeZion of the Israeli Premier League. Williams parted ways with the team on October 28, after appearing in three games.

=== Gießen 46ers (2021–2022) ===
On November 30, 2021, he has signed with Gießen 46ers of the Basketball Bundesliga.
