= David Walker (basketball) =

American basketball player (born 1993)

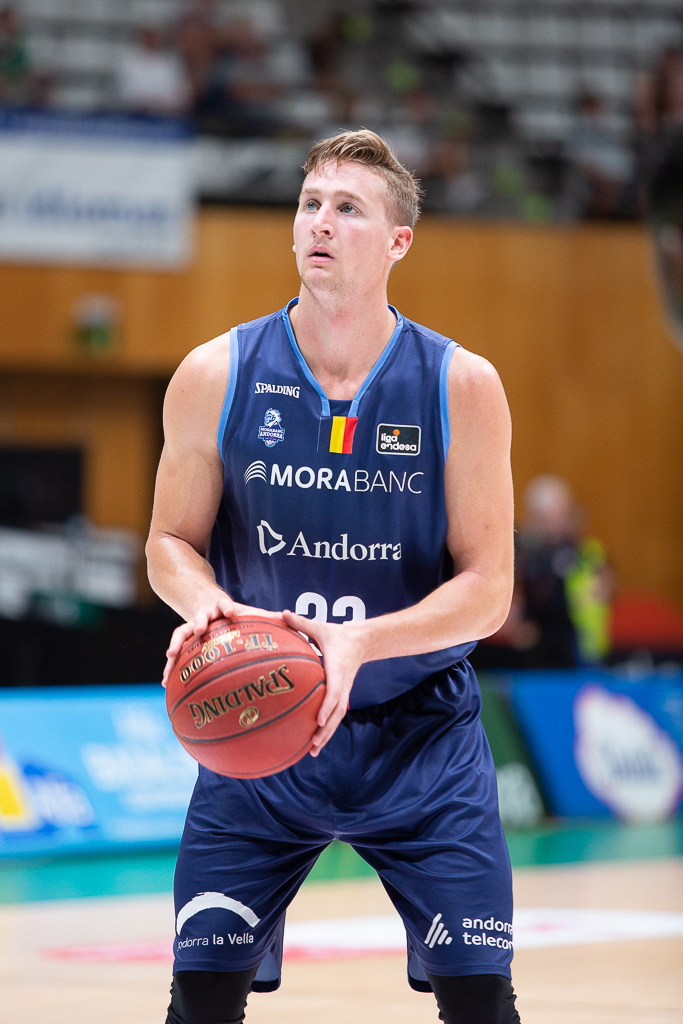
- Walker in 2019

Free Agent
- Position: Small forward

Personal information
- Born: November 24, 1993 (age 32) Stow, Ohio
- Listed height: 6 ft 6 in (1.98 m)
- Listed weight: 196 lb (89 kg)

Career information
- High school: Stow-Munroe Falls (Stow, Ohio)
- College: Northeastern (2012–2016)
- NBA draft: 2016: undrafted
- Playing career: 2016–present

Career history
- 2016–2020: MoraBanc Andorra
- 2020–2021: Medi Bayreuth
- 2021–2022: MHP Riesen Ludwigsburg
- 2022: Bilbao
- 2022–2023: Obradoiro
- 2024: Stal Ostrów Wielkopolski

Career highlights
- First-team All-CAA (2016); Second-team All-CAA (2015)

David Michael Walker (born November 24, 1993) is an American professional basketball player who last played for Stal Ostrów Wielkopolski of the Polish Basketball League.

== College career ==
A 2012 graduate of Stow-Munroe Falls High School, Walker attended Northeastern University from 2012 to 2016. He finished his four-year Husky career as the school's eighth all-time leading scorer with 1,631 points, fifth all-time assist man (420 assists) and second all-time leader in three-pointers made (250).

== Professional career ==
He represented the Miami Heat in the 2016 NBA Summer League and signed with MoraBanc Andorra of the Spanish Liga ACB in August 2016. He made 35 ACB appearances as a first-year professional player, averaging 9.0 points as well as 2.6 rebounds and 1.4 assists. Walker led Andorra in made three-pointers (61) over the course of the 2016–17 season.

On July 3, 2018, he re-signed with MoraBanc Andorra.

On July 31, 2020, he signed with Medi Bayreuth of the Basketball Bundesliga. In Bundesliga play, Walker was 57–133 from three-point range in the 2020–21 season, averaging 8.4 points per game.

He signed a deal with fellow Bundesliga outfit MHP Riesen Ludwigsburg in August 2021.

On January 17, 2022, he signed with Bilbao Basket of the Liga ACB.

On August 13, 2022, he signed with Monbus Obradoiro of the Spanish Liga ACB.
