= Earl Grant (basketball) =

American basketball player and coach (born 1976)

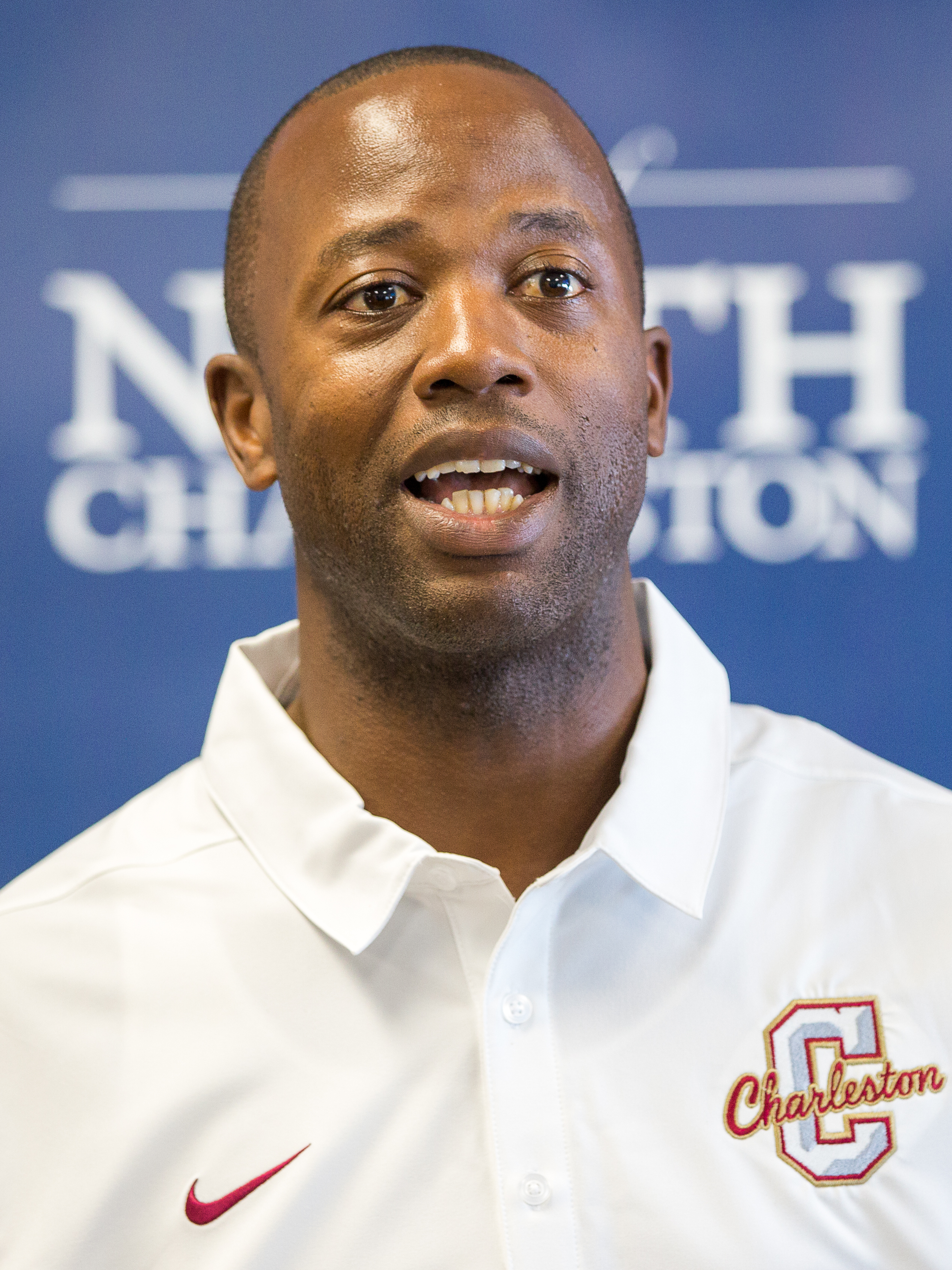
- Grant in 2016

Current position
- Title: Assistant Coach
- Team: Tennessee
- Conference: SEC

Biographical details
- Born: December 25, 1976 (age 49); North Charleston, South Carolina, U.S.

Playing career
- 1999–2000: Georgia College
- Position: Guard

Coaching career (HC unless noted)
- 2002–2004: The Citadel (assistant)
- 2004–2007: Winthrop (assistant)
- 2007–2010: Wichita State (assistant)
- 2010–2014: Clemson (assistant)
- 2014–2021: Charleston
- 2021–2026: Boston College
- 2026–present: Tennessee (assistant)

Head coaching record
- Overall: 199–181 (.524)
- Tournaments: 0–1 (NCAA Division I); 1–2 (NIT)

Accomplishments and honors

Championships
- CAA regular season (2018); CAA tournament (2018)

Awards
- CAA Coach of the Year (2017)

Earl Grant (born December 25, 1976) is an assistant men’s basketball coach for the Tennessee Volunteers. He was most recently the head coach for the Boston College Eagles men's basketball team. Prior to being at Boston College, Grant served as head coach at the College of Charleston, as an assistant coach at Clemson University, and an assistant coach for six years under former Charleston assistant coach Gregg Marshall at Wichita State and Winthrop University. Grant also served as an assistant coach at The Citadel.

== Biography ==
A native of North Charleston, South Carolina, Grant went to R.B. Stall High School. He played college basketball at the NCAA Division II level at Georgia College for two years. He led Georgia College to consecutive Peach Belt Conference championships and the Elite Eight of the 2000 NCAA Tournament. Grant graduated from Georgia College in 2000 with a bachelor's degree in psychology. He is married to Jacci Grant and has three sons: Trey, Eyzaiah, and Elonzo.

Grant began his coaching career as an assistant at The Citadel under Pat Dennis from 2002 to 2004. Gregg Marshall hired Grant as an assistant at Winthrop University in 2004, and when Marshall left to take the head coaching gig at Wichita State in 2007, he brought Grant along with him. Grant was hired as an assistant at Clemson in 2010, serving under Brad Brownell. Grant recruited future NBA players K.J. McDaniels and Jaron Blossomgame to Clemson.

On September 2, 2014, Grant was hired as the head coach of the College of Charleston, replacing Doug Wojcik. Dennis, Marshall and Brownell all praised the hire. “We are thrilled to welcome Earl back home and to the College of Charleston,” athletic director Joe Hull said. “He will bring great energy and excitement to our program. He has learned the game from terrific coaches and is ready to lead the Cougars. We need to hit the ground running and Earl is ready to do that.”

Grant led the College of Charleston to the NCAA Tournament in 2018 and was a finalist for the Skip Prosser Man of the year Award in 2019. On March 15, 2021, he was announced as the head coach at Boston College. Grant was fired by Boston College in March 2026 after five seasons without making it to the NCAA tournament.

== Head coaching record ==
Record table
Season	Team	Overall	Conference	Standing	Postseason
College of Charleston Cougars (Colonial Athletic Association) (2014–2021)
2014–15	College of Charleston	9–24	3–15	10th	
2015–16	College of Charleston	17–14	8–10	7th	
2016–17	College of Charleston	25–10	14–4	2nd	NIT First Round
2017–18	College of Charleston	26–8	14–4	T–1st	NCAA Division I Round of 64
2018–19	College of Charleston	24–9	12–6	3rd	
2019–20	College of Charleston	17–14	11–7	T–4th	
2020–21	College of Charleston	9–10	7–4	3rd	
College of Charleston:		127–89 (.588)	69–50 (.580)		
Boston College Eagles (Atlantic Coast Conference) (2021–2026)
2021–22	Boston College	13–20	6–14	T–11th	
2022–23	Boston College	16–17	9–11	10th	
2023–24	Boston College	20–16	8–12	11th	NIT Second Round
2024–25	Boston College	12–19	4–16	17th	
2025–26	Boston College	11–20	4–14	T–16th	
Boston College:		72–92 (.439)	31–67 (.316)		
Total:		199–181 (.524)			
National champion Postseason invitational champion Conference regular season champion Conference regular season and conference tournament champion Division regular season champion Division regular season and conference tournament champion Conference tournament champion
