= Quincy Ford =

American basketball player (born 1993)

Free Agent
- Position: Power forward

Personal information
- Born: January 20, 1993 (age 33) St. Petersburg, Florida, U.S.
- Listed height: 6 ft 8 in (2.03 m)
- Listed weight: 225 lb (102 kg)

Career information
- High school: Gibbs (St. Petersburg, Florida)
- College: Northeastern (2011–2016)
- NBA draft: 2016: undrafted
- Playing career: 2016–present

Career history
- 2016–2017: Salt Lake City Stars
- 2017–2018: Szolnoki Olaj
- 2018–2019: Spirou
- 2019–2020: Crailsheim Merlins
- 2020–2021: BCM Gravelines-Dunkerque
- 2021: Promitheas Patras
- 2021–2022: Soproni KC
- 2022–2023: Alba Fehérvár
- 2023–2024: Victoria Libertas Pesaro
- 2024–2025: Czarni Słupsk
- 2025–2026: Start Lublin

Career highlights
- Polish Supercup winner (2025); Hungarian League champion (2018); Hungarian Cup champion (2018); Second-team All-CAA (2016)
- Stats at Basketball Reference

Quincy G. Ford (born January 20, 1993) is an American professional basketball player who last played for Start Lublin of the Polish Basketball League (PLK). He played college basketball for the Northeastern Huskies.

== High school career ==
A 6 ft 8 in (2.03 m) forward from St. Petersburg, Florida, Ford was homeschooled but played basketball for Gibbs High School. As a senior, he led Gibbs to two district titles, a regional title and an appearance in the state final four.

== College career ==
He played college basketball for Northeastern and was the first homeschooled player that coach Bill Coen recruited. He averaged 11.5 points per game as a freshman and 12.9 point per game as a sophomore. In his junior season, he played two games before deciding to sit out to have back surgery. The following year, he averaged 10.4 points, 5.4 rebounds, and 3.2 assists per game to lead Northeastern to its first NCAA Tournament berth in 24 years. He was named MVP of the 2015 CAA men's basketball tournament after scoring 22 points in a victory over William & Mary in the title game. As a redshirt senior, he averaged 16.1 points and 7.1 rebounds per game. He was named to the Second-team All-Colonial Athletic Association.

== Professional career ==
After going undrafted in the 2016 NBA draft, Ford joined the Utah Jazz for the 2016 NBA Summer League, where he averaged 5.1 points, 5.2 rebounds and 1.0 assists in eight games. On September 6, 2016, he signed with the Jazz, but was waived on October 13 after appearing in one preseason game. He went on to sign with the New Orleans Pelicans on October 17, where he was waived also five days later. On October 31, he was acquired by the Salt Lake City Stars of the NBA Development League.

Ford spent the 2017–18 season with Szolnoki Olaj of the Hungarian league, where he averaged 11.4 points and 7.6 rebounds per game. On August 11, 2018, Ford signed with Proximus Spirou of the Belgian side.

On July 19, 2020, he has signed with BCM Gravelines-Dunkerque of the French LNB Pro A.

On January 17, 2021, he signed with Promitheas Patras of the Greek Basket League.

On July 27, 2021, he signed with VEF Rīga of the Latvian-Estonian Basketball League and Basketball Champions League. On August 26, VEF Riga announced that they have terminated the contract with Ford due to his refusal to be vaccinated against COVID-19. He signed with Soproni KC of the Nemzeti Bajnokság I/A on August 31.

On July 11, 2023, he signed with Victoria Libertas Pesaro of the Italian Lega Basket Serie A (LBA).

On July 26, 2025, he signed with Start Lublin of the Polish Basketball League (PLK).

== Personal life ==
The son of Alfredo and Denise Ford, he has three sisters and seven brothers. Ford graduated with a degree in human services.
