= Juan'ya Green =

American basketball player (born 1992)

Personal information
- Born: February 8, 1992 (age 34) Philadelphia, Pennsylvania, U.S.
- Listed height: 6 ft 2 in (1.88 m)
- Listed weight: 195 lb (88 kg)

Career information
- High school: Archbishop John Carroll (Radnor, Pennsylvania)
- College: Niagara (2011–2013); Hofstra (2014–2016)
- NBA draft: 2016: undrafted
- Playing career: 2016–2020
- Position: Point guard / shooting guard

Career history
- 2016: Kymis
- 2017–2018: Tampereen Pyrintö
- 2018–2019: KTE-Duna Aszfalt
- 2020: Al Sadd

Career highlights
- CAA Player of the Year (2016); AP honorable mention All-American (2016); 2× First-team All-CAA (2015, 2016); First-team All-MAAC (2013); Third-team All-MAAC (2012); MAAC Rookie of the Year (2012)

Juan'ya Green (born February 8, 1992) is an American former professional basketball player. He completed his college career in 2016 after having split his career playing for Niagara University and Hofstra University. Green went unselected in the ensuing 2016 NBA draft.

== High school career ==
A native of Philadelphia, Pennsylvania, Green's played his prep years at Archbishop John Carroll High School. He had a successful career and garnered a number of awards and records, including: leaving as the school's all-time leading scorer (1,492 points); being named to the first-team All-Catholic League, all-city, and all-state honors as a senior; being named the Delco Times and Mainline Player of the Year as a senior; he was also named the Catholic League Co-Player of the Year in 2011; Green led Patriots to the Pennsylvania Interscholastic Athletic Association Class AAA state championship in 2009; and he also earned All-American honorable mention honors from Max Preps as a junior.

== College career ==
Green began his college career playing for Niagara University. He and close childhood friend Ameen Tanksley had grown up talking about playing college basketball together, and they both fulfilled that promise by deciding to play for head coach Joe Mihalich. Green powered Niagara to good seasons in 2011–12 and 2012–13, where the Purple Eagles won the Metro Atlantic Athletic Conference (MAAC) regular season championship in the latter year. In 2011–12, Green was named the MAAC Rookie of the Year and was voted to the all-MAAC third-team. CollegeInsider.com named him their national freshman of the year. In the championship season, he moved up to become a first-team all-conference selection as just a sophomore. When Mihalich took a new head coaching job at Hofstra University following 2012–13, both Green and Tanksley decided to follow him to the new school. Green has already scored 1,131 points at Niagara, but due to NCAA regulations, he and Tanksley had to redshirt the 2013–14 season at Hofstra due to being transfer players.

Green became eligible to play for the Pride upon the 2014–15 season and made an immediate impact. He averaged 17.1 points per game and was named a first-team all-Colonial Athletic Association (CAA) player. Hofstra named him their winner of the annual James M. Shuart Award, given to the school's male student-athlete of the year. Despite his personal success on the court, the team itself struggled to 10 wins, largely due to fallout from a scandal the year before that had preceded Mihalich's tenure. The following year, Green's senior season, Hofstra went 14–4 in CAA play and shared the regular season championship with UNC Wilmington. His 17.8 points per game ranked second in the CAA, while his 7.1 assists per game ranked first in the conference and sixth nationally; Green also ranked third in the CAA with 1.6 steals per game. On December 28, 2015, he recorded the first triple-double in Hofstra history after compiling 15 points, 10 rebounds, and 10 assists against LIU Brooklyn. Less than six weeks later, on February 7, 2016, Green made history again. He scored his 1,000th career point in a Hofstra uniform, becoming just the fourth men's basketball player in NCAA Division I history to score 1,000 points at two different schools.^{[a]} Toward the end of the season Green was named the Colonial Athletic Association Player of the Year and received 35 out of 40 possible votes. Among other national honors, the Associated Press named Green to the honorable mention All-America team. Green left Hofstra with 1,186 points (22nd in school history as of his graduation), 463 assists (sixth in program history), and the single-season assists record holder after he accumulated 243 in 2015–16. Overall, Green finished his college career with 2,317 points, 773 assists, 531 rebounds, and 230 steals.

== Professional career ==
Green went undrafted in the 2016 NBA draft despite his college success. He started his pro career with the newly promoted to the Greek Basket League club Kymis.

== Footnotes ==
- ^{a} Others include Joe Manning (Oklahoma City / North Texas), Kenny Battle (Northern Illinois / Illinois), and Gary Neal (La Salle / Towson). At the time Manning played for Oklahoma City it was still classified as a Division I school by the NCAA.
