= List of Western Carolina Catamounts men's basketball seasons =

This is a list of seasons completed by the Western Carolina Catamounts men's basketball team since formation in 1928. They are currently members of the Southern Conference and have appeared in the NCAA tournament one time.

== Season results ==
Record table
| Season | Coach | Overall | Conference | Standing | Postseason |
|---|---|---|---|---|---|
Independent () (1973–1976)
| 1973–74 | Jim Hartbarger | 11–14 | | | |
| 1974–75 | Fred Conley | 15–11 | | | |
| 1975–76 | Fred Conley | 13–12 | | | |
Southern Conference (Division I) (1976–present)
| 1976–77 | Fred Conley | 8–16 | | | |
| 1977–78 | Steve Cottrell | 7–19 | 4–8 | 6th | |
| 1978–79 | Steve Cottrell | 14–14 | 5–7 | 4th | |
| 1979–80 | Steve Cottrell | 17–10 | 9–7 | 3rd | |
| 1980–81 | Steve Cottrell | 18–10 | 9–7 | T–4th | |
| 1981–82 | Steve Cottrell | 19–8 | 11–5 | 2nd | |
| 1982–83 | Steve Cottrell | 17–12 | 9–7 | 4th | |
| 1983–84 | Steve Cottrell | 15–13 | 9–7 | 4th | |
| 1984–85 | Steve Cottrell | 14–14 | 8–8 | 4th | |
| 1985–86 | Steve Cottrell | 14–14 | 8–8 | T–5th | |
| 1986–87 | Steve Cottrell | 10–19 | 4–12 | 7th | |
| 1987–88 | Herb Krusen | 8–19 | 2–14 | 9th | |
| 1988–89 | Dave Possinger | 12–16 | 4–10 | 8th | |
| 1989–90 | Greg Blatt | 10–18 | 3–11 | 8th | |
| 1990–91 | Greg Blatt | 11–17 | 3–11 | 7th | |
| 1991–92 | Greg Blatt | 11–17 | 5–9 | 5th | |
| 1992–93 | Greg Blatt | 6–21 | 2–16 | 10th | |
| 1993–94 | Benny Dees | 12–16 | 8–10 | 6th | |
| 1994–95 | Benny Dees | 14–14 | 8–6 | 4th | |
| 1995–96 | Phil Hopkins | 17–13 | 10–4 | T–2nd | NCAA first round |
| 1996–97 | Phil Hopkins | 14–13 | 7–7 | T–5th | |
| 1997–98 | Phil Hopkins | 12–15 | 6–9 | T–7th | |
| 1998–99 | Phil Hopkins | 8–21 | 2–14 | 12th | |
| 1999–00 | Phil Hopkins | 14–14 | 7–9 | 8th | |
| 2000–01 | Steve Shurnia | 6–25 | 3–13 | 12th | |
| 2001–02 | Steve Shurina | 12–16 | 6–10 | 9th | |
| 2002–03 | Steve Shurina | 9–19 | 6–10 | 9th | |
| 2003–04 | Steve Shurina | 13–15 | 6–10 | 9th | |
| 2004–05 | Steve Shurina | 8–22 | 3–13 | 12th | |
| 2005–06 | Larry Hunter | 13–17 | 7–7 | 7th | |
| 2006–07 | Larry Hunter | 11–20 | 7–11 | T–6th | |
| 2007–08 | Larry Hunter | 10–21 | 6–14 | T–9th | |
| 2008–09 | Larry Hunter | 16–15 | 11–9 | T–5th | |
| 2009–10 | Larry Hunter | 22–12 | 11–7 | T–4th | CIT first round |
| 2010–11 | Larry Hunter | 18–15 | 12–6 | T–3rd | |
| 2011–12 | Larry Hunter | 17–18 | 8–10 | T–7th | |
| 2012–13 | Larry Hunter | 14–19 | 9–9 | T–5th | |
| 2013–14 | Larry Hunter | 19–15 | 10–6 | 5th | |
| 2014–15 | Larry Hunter | 14–16 | 8–8 | 4th | |
| 2015–16 | Larry Hunter | 16–18 | 10–8 | T–5th | CBI first round |
| 2016–17 | Larry Hunter | 9–23 | 4–14 | T–8th | |
| 2017–18 | Larry Hunter | 13–19 | 8–10 | 6th | |
| 2018–19 | Mark Prosser | 7–25 | 4–14 | T–8th | |
| 2019–20 | Mark Prosser | 19–12 | 10–8 | T–5th | |
| 2020–21 | Mark Prosser | 11–16 | 4–13 | 9th | |
| 2021–22 | Justin Gray | 11–21 | 5–13 | 10th | |
| 2022–23 | Justin Gray | 18–16 | 10–8 | 4th | CBI first round |
| 2023–24 | Justin Gray | 22–10 | 11–7 | 4th | |
| 2024–25 | Tim Craft | 8–22 | 4–14 | 9th | |
| 2025–26 | Tim Craft | 15–16 | 10–8 | T–5th | |
| Total: | | | | | |
National champion Postseason invitational champion Conference regular season champion Conference regular season and conference tournament champion Division regular season champion Division regular season and conference tournament champion Conference tournament champion
