= 1996–97 Chattanooga Mocs basketball team =

American college basketball season

1996–97 Chattanooga Mocs men's basketball

SoCon regular season and tournament champions

NCAA tournament, Sweet Sixteen
- Conference: Southern Conference
- South
- Record: 24–11 (11–3 SoCon)
- Head coach: Mack McCarthy (7th season)
- Home arena: UTC Arena

1996–97 Southern Conference men's basketball standings
	Conf.				Overall
Team	W		L	PCT	W		L	PCT
North
Marshall	10	–	4	.714	20	–	9	.690
Davidson	10	–	4	.714	18	–	10	.643
Appalachian State	8	–	6	.571	14	–	14	.500
VMI	7	–	7	.500	12	–	16	.429
East Tennessee State	2	–	12	.143	7	–	20	.259
South
Chattanooga†	11	–	3	.786	24	–	11	.686
Western Carolina	7	–	7	.500	14	–	13	.519
The Citadel	6	–	8	.429	13	–	14	.481
Georgia Southern	5	–	9	.357	10	–	18	.357
Furman	4	–	10	.286	10	–	17	.370
† SoCon Tournament winner As of April 30, 1997; Rankings from AP poll

The 1996–97 Chattanooga Mocs basketball team represented the University of Tennessee at Chattanooga as a member of the Southern Conference during the 1996–97 NCAA Division I men's basketball season. Their head coach was Mack McCarthy and the team played their home games at UTC Arena. The Mocs won the regular season and SoCon tournament titles, the latter earning the Mocs an automatic bid to the 1997 NCAA tournament. Participating in the Big Dance for the fourth time in five years, Chattanooga made a run to the Sweet Sixteen by defeating No. 3 seed Georgia and No. 6 seed Illinois before falling to No. 10 seed Providence in the Southeast Regional semifinals.

== Roster ==
1996–97 Chattanooga Mocs men's basketball team
Players
Coaches

Pos.	#	Name	Height	Weight	Year	Hometown
G	3	Willie Young	6 ft 2 in (1.88 m)	180 lb (82 kg)	Sr	Norfolk, VA
G	10	Wes Moore	5 ft 11 in (1.8 m)	—	So	Lookout Mountain, GA
F	23	Johnny Taylor	6 ft 9 in (2.06 m)	220 lb (100 kg)	Sr	Chattanooga, TN
F/C	34	Chris Mims	6 ft 7 in (2.01 m)	215 lb (98 kg)	Sr	Union Springs, AL

Head coach

- Mack McCarthy (Virginia Tech)

Assistant coach(es)

Legend

- (C) Team captain
- (S) Suspended
- (I) Ineligible
- (W) Walk-on
- Injured
- Current redshirt

Roster
Last update: 2021-Jun-6

== Schedule and results ==
Date time, TV	Rank^{#}	Opponent^{#}	Result	Record	Site (attendance) city, state
Regular season
Nov 22, 1996*		Tennessee Wesleyan	W 113–46	1–0	UTC Arena (3,641); Chattanooga, Tennessee
Nov 23, 1996*		South Carolina-Aiken	W 110–61	2–0	UTC Arena (3,007); Chattanooga, Tennessee
Nov 29, 1996*		vs. Missouri; San Juan Shootout	L 74–83	2–1	Caguas Municipal Complex (200); San Juan, Puerto Rico
Nov 30, 1996*		vs. Delaware; San Juan Shootout	L 74–83	2–2	Caguas Municipal Complex (300); San Juan, Puerto Rico
Dec 1, 1996*		at Puerto Rico-Mayagüez; San Juan Shootout	W 83–74	3–2	Caguas Municipal Complex (175); San Juan, Puerto Rico
Dec 3, 1996*		Penn State	L 63–73	3–3	UTC Arena (7,940); Chattanooga, Tennessee
Dec 14, 1996*		at Middle Tennessee	L 73–83	3–4	Murphy Athletic Center (3,114); Murfreesboro, Tennessee
Dec 18, 1996*		at Alabama-Birmingham	L 65–75	3–5	UAB Arena (3,130); Birmingham, Alabama
Dec 21, 1996*		Tennessee State	W 67–49	4–5	UTC Arena (5,297); Chattanooga, Tennessee
Dec 23, 1996		at Marshall	L 83–90	4–6 (0–1)	Cam Henderson Center (4,217); Huntington, West Virginia
Dec 28, 1996*		Coastal Carolina; Dr. Pepper Classic	W 75–69 ^{OT}	5–6	UTC Arena (4,119); Chattanooga, Tennessee
Dec 29, 1996*		Canisius; Dr. Pepper Classic	L 49–63	5–7	UTC Arena (3,987); Chattanooga, Tennessee
Jan 6, 1997*		Wofford	W 83–46	6–7	UTC Arena (3,819); Chattanooga, Tennessee
Jan 9, 1997		at Furman	W 81–45	7–7 (1–1)	Physical Activity Center (1,000); Greenville, South Carolina
Jan 11, 1997		at VMI	W 91–76	8–7 (2–1)	Cameron Hall (1,116); Lexington, Virginia
Jan 18, 1997		at Davidson	W 74–63	9–7 (3–1)	Belk Arena (2,489); Davidson, North Carolina
Jan 20, 1997		Furman	W 68–47	10–7 (4–1)	UTC Arena (5,280); Chattanooga, Tennessee
Jan 25, 1997		Western Carolina	W 87–60	11–7 (5–1)	UTC Arena (5,943); Chattanooga, Tennessee
Jan 27, 1997		Georgia Southern	W 76–55	12–7 (6–1)	UTC Arena (5,231); Chattanooga, Tennessee
Jan 29, 1997		East Tennessee State	W 83–53	13–7 (7–1)	UTC Arena (5,670); Chattanooga, Tennessee
Feb 1, 1997		Appalachian State	W 70–57	14–7 (8–1)	UTC Arena (6,911); Chattanooga, Tennessee
Feb 3, 1997		at The Citadel	W 72–66	15–7 (9–1)	McAlister Field House (764); Charleston, South Carolina
Feb 6, 1997*		Alabama-Birmingham	W 64–59	16–7	UTC Arena (7,590); Chattanooga, Tennessee
Feb 8, 1997		at East Tennessee State	L 69–70 ^{OT}	16–8 (9–2)	Memorial Center (4,150); Johnson City, Tennessee
Feb 10, 1997		The Citadel	W 71–59	17–8 (10–2)	UTC Arena (8,005); Chattanooga, Tennessee
Feb 15, 1997		at Western Carolina	L 66–68	17–9 (10–3)	Ramsey Center (2,662); Cullowhee, North Carolina
Feb 17, 1997		at Georgia Southern	L 67–70	17–10 (10–4)	Hanner Fieldhouse (1,908); Statesboro, Georgia
Feb 22, 1997		Marshall	W 92–72	18–10 (11–4)	UTC Arena (9,211); Chattanooga, Tennessee
Feb 24, 1997*		Cumberland University	W 92–60	19–10	UTC Arena (4,783); Chattanooga, Tennessee
SoCon tournament
Feb 28, 1997*	(S1)	vs. (N4) VMI; Quarterfinals	W 84–62	20–10	Greensboro Coliseum (1,756); Greensboro, North Carolina
Mar 1, 1997*	(S1)	vs. (N2) Davidson; Semifinals	W 77–70	21–10	Greensboro Coliseum (4,297); Greensboro, North Carolina
Mar 2, 1997*	(S1)	vs. (N1) Marshall; Championship	W 71–70 ^{OT}	22–10	Greensboro Coliseum (5,390); Greensboro, North Carolina
NCAA tournament
Mar 14, 1997*	(14 SE)	vs. (3 SE) No. 17 Georgia; First round	W 73–70	23–10	Charlotte Coliseum (11,206); Charlotte, North Carolina
Mar 16, 1997*	(14 SE)	vs. (6 SE) No. 19 Illinois; Second Round	W 75–63	24–10	Charlotte Coliseum (14,864); Charlotte, North Carolina
Mar 21, 1997*	(14 SE)	vs. (10 SE) Providence; Southeast Regional semifinal – Sweet Sixteen	L 65–71	24–11	Birmingham-Jefferson Civic Center (17,647); Birmingham, Alabama
*Non-conference game. ^{#}Rankings from AP poll. (#) Tournament seedings in parentheses. SE=Southeast. All times are in Eastern Time.
