= 1997–98 Davidson Wildcats men's basketball team =

American college basketball season

1997–98 Davidson Wildcats men's basketball

SoCon regular season champions SoCon tournament champions

NCAA tournament, First Round
- Conference: Southern Conference
- North
- Record: 20–10 (13–2 SoCon)
- Head coach: Bob McKillop (9th season)
- Home arena: Belk Arena

1997–98 Southern Conference men's basketball standings
	Conf.				Overall
Team	W		L	PCT	W		L	PCT
North
Davidson †	13	–	2	.867	20	–	10	.667
Appalachian State	13	–	2	.867	21	–	8	.724
VMI	8	–	7	.533	14	–	13	.519
Western Carolina	6	–	9	.400	12	–	15	.444
East Tennessee State	6	–	9	.400	11	–	16	.407
UNC Greensboro	6	–	9	.400	9	–	19	.321
South
Chattanooga	7	–	7	.500	13	–	15	.464
Wofford	6	–	8	.429	9	–	18	.333
The Citadel	6	–	8	.429	15	–	13	.536
Georgia Southern	5	–	9	.357	9	–	20	.310
Furman	4	–	10	.286	10	–	18	.357
† 1998 SoCon Tournament winner As of April 30, 1998; Rankings from AP poll

The 1997–98 Davidson Wildcats men's basketball team represented Davidson College in NCAA men's Division I competition during the 1997–98 NCAA Division I men's basketball season. Led by head coach Bob McKillop, the team played its home games at Belk Arena. The Wildcats finished atop the Southern Conference regular season standings and won the Southern Conference tournament to receive an automatic bid to the NCAA tournament as No. 14 seed in the Southeast region. Davidson finished win an overall record of 20–10 (13–2 SoCon).

== Roster ==
1997–98 Davidson Wildcats men's basketball team
Players
Coaches

Pos.	#	Name	Height	Weight	Year	Hometown
G		Mark Donnelly	6 ft 5 in (1.96 m)	—	Sr
F		Landry Kosmalski	6 ft 7 in (2.01 m)	205 lb (93 kg)	So	Euless, Texas

Head coach

- Bob McKillop (Hofstra)

Assistant coach(es)

Legend

- (C) Team captain
- (S) Suspended
- (I) Ineligible
- (W) Walk-on
- Injured
- Current redshirt

Roster

== Schedule and results ==
Date time, TV	Rank^{#}	Opponent^{#}	Result	Record	Site city, state
Regular season
Nov 20, 1997*		at No. 3 Duke	L 65–100	0–1	Cameron Indoor Stadium; Durham, North Carolina
Nov 23, 1997*		New Hampshire	W 72–53	1–1	Belk Arena; Charlotte, North Carolina
Nov 29, 1997*		Tufts	W 89–68	2–1	Belk Arena; Charlotte, North Carolina
Dec 3, 1997*		No. 24 Wake Forest	L 56–61	2–2	Belk Arena; Charlotte, North Carolina
Dec 10, 1997*		at Charlotte	L 55–70		Dale F. Halton Arena; Charlotte, North Carolina
Dec 28, 1997*		vs. Kansas State; Fiesta Bowl Classic	L 63–70		McKale Center; Tucson, Arizona
Dec 30, 1997*; 4:15 p.m.		vs. James Madison; Fiesta Bowl Classic	W 87–69		McKale Center; Tucson, Arizona
Jan 2, 1998		at Western Carolina	W 79–57		Ramsey Center; Cullowhee, North Carolina
Jan 5, 1998		at The Citadel	L 59–74		McAlister Field House; Charleston, South Carolina
Jan 12, 1998		VMI	L 58–61		Belk Arena; Charlotte, North Carolina
Jan 22, 1998*		UMass	L 66–82		Belk Arena (4,417); Charlotte, North Carolina
Jan 24, 1998		at Western Carolina	W 79–73		Ramsey Center; Cullowhee, North Carolina
Feb 16, 1998		at VMI	W 90–66		Cameron Hall; Lexington, Virginia
SoCon Tournament
Feb 27, 1998*		vs. Georgia Southern; Quarterfinals	W 74–68	18–9	Greensboro Coliseum; Greensboro, North Carolina
Feb 28, 1998*		vs. The Citadel; Semifinals	W 68–59	19–9	Greensboro Coliseum; Greensboro, North Carolina
Mar 1, 1998*		vs. Appalachian State; Championship game	W 66–62	20–9	Greensboro Coliseum; Greensboro, North Carolina
NCAA Tournament
Mar 13, 1998*	(14 SE)	vs. (3 SE) No. 12 Michigan; First round	L 61–80	20–10	Georgia Dome; Atlanta, Georgia
*Non-conference game. ^{#}Rankings from AP. (#) Tournament seedings in parentheses. SE=Southeast. All times are in Eastern.
