= 1993 Southern Conference men's basketball tournament =

- Classification: Division I
- Season: 1992–93
- Teams: 10
- Site: Asheville Civic Center; Asheville, NC
- Champions: Chattanooga (5th title)
- Winning coach: Mack McCarthy (2nd title)

1992–93 Southern Conference men's basketball standings
	Conf.				Overall
Team	W		L	PCT	W		L	PCT
Chattanooga †	16	–	2	.889	26	–	7	.788
East Tennessee State	12	–	6	.667	19	–	10	.655
Georgia Southern	12	–	6	.667	19	–	9	.679
Marshall	11	–	7	.611	16	–	11	.593
Davidson	10	–	8	.556	14	–	14	.500
The Citadel	8	–	10	.444	10	–	17	.370
Appalachian State	8	–	10	.444	13	–	15	.464
Furman	8	–	10	.444	11	–	17	.393
VMI	3	–	15	.167	5	–	22	.185
Western Carolina	2	–	16	.111	6	–	21	.222
† 1993 SoCon Tournament winner As of April 30, 1993; Rankings from AP poll

The 1993 Southern Conference men's basketball tournament took place from March 4–7, 1993 at the Asheville Civic Center in Asheville, North Carolina. The Chattanooga Mocs, led by head coach Mack McCarthy, won their fifth Southern Conference title and received the automatic berth to the 1993 NCAA tournament.

== Format ==
All of the conference's ten members were eligible for the tournament. Teams were seeded based on conference winning percentage. The tournament used a preset bracket consisting of four rounds, the first of which featured two games, with the winners moving on to the quarterfinal round.

== Bracket ==
First round March 4
8	VMI	51
9	Furman	76
7	Appalachian State	84
10	Western Carolina	73

Quarterfinals; March 5
1	Chattanooga	85
9	Furman	69
4	Marshall	65
5	Davidson	67
2	East Tennessee St.	97
7	Appalachian State	84
3	Georgia Southern	72
6	The Citadel	41

Semifinals; March 6
1	Chattanooga	72
5	Davidson	68
2	East Tennessee St.	84*
3	Georgia Southern	76

Finals; March 7
1	Chattanooga	86
2	East Tennessee St.	75

* Overtime game

== See also ==
- List of Southern Conference men's basketball champions
