= 1998 Southern Conference men's basketball tournament =

- Classification: Division I
- Season: 1997–98
- Teams: 10
- Site: Greensboro Coliseum; Greensboro, NC
- Champions: Davidson (6th title)
- Winning coach: Bob McKillop (1st title)

1997–98 Southern Conference men's basketball standings
	Conf.				Overall
Team	W		L	PCT	W		L	PCT
North
Davidson †	13	–	2	.867	20	–	10	.667
Appalachian State	13	–	2	.867	21	–	8	.724
VMI	8	–	7	.533	14	–	13	.519
Western Carolina	6	–	9	.400	12	–	15	.444
East Tennessee State	6	–	9	.400	11	–	16	.407
UNC Greensboro	6	–	9	.400	9	–	19	.321
South
Chattanooga	7	–	7	.500	13	–	15	.464
Wofford	6	–	8	.429	9	–	18	.333
The Citadel	6	–	8	.429	15	–	13	.536
Georgia Southern	5	–	9	.357	9	–	20	.310
Furman	4	–	10	.286	10	–	18	.357
† 1998 SoCon Tournament winner As of April 30, 1998; Rankings from AP poll

The 1998 Southern Conference men's basketball tournament took place from February 26–March 1, 1998, at the Greensboro Coliseum in Greensboro, North Carolina. The Davidson Wildcats, led by head coach Bob McKillop, won their sixth Southern Conference title and received the automatic berth to the 1998 NCAA tournament.

== Format ==
The top ten finishers of the conference's eleven members were eligible for the tournament. Teams were seeded based on conference winning percentage. The tournament used a preset bracket consisting of four rounds, the first of which featured two games, with the winners moving on to the quarterfinal round. The top three finishers in each division received first round byes.

== Bracket ==
First round February 26
4S	Georgia Southern	57
5N	East Tennessee St.	47
4N	Western Carolina	59
6N	UNC Greensboro	60

Quarterfinals; February 27
1N	Davidson	74
4S	Georgia Southern	68
2S	The Citadel	77
3N	VMI	66
1S	Chattanooga	56
6N	UNC Greensboro	55
2N	Appalachian State	60
3S	Furman	58

Semifinals; February 28
1N	Davidson	68
2S	The Citadel	59
1S	Chattanooga	75
2N	Appalachian State	85

Finals; March 1
1N	Davidson	66
2N	Appalachian State	62

* Overtime game

== See also ==
- List of Southern Conference men's basketball champions
