= 1999 Southern Conference men's basketball tournament =

- Classification: Division I
- Season: 1998–99
- Teams: 12
- Site: Greensboro Coliseum; Greensboro, NC
- Champions: College of Charleston (1st title)
- Winning coach: John Kresse (1st title)

1998–99 Southern Conference men's basketball standings
	Conf.				Overall
Team	W		L	PCT	W		L	PCT
North
Appalachian State	13	–	3	.813	21	–	8	.724
Davidson	11	–	5	.688	16	–	11	.593
East Tennessee State	9	–	7	.563	17	–	11	.607
VMI	9	–	7	.563	12	–	15	.444
UNC Greensboro	5	–	11	.313	7	–	20	.259
Western Carolina	2	–	14	.125	8	–	21	.276
South
No. 16 College of Charleston †	16	–	0	1.000	28	–	3	.903
Chattanooga	9	–	7	.563	16	–	12	.571
Wofford	8	–	8	.500	11	–	16	.407
Georgia Southern	6	–	10	.375	11	–	17	.393
Furman	5	–	11	.313	12	–	16	.429
The Citadel	3	–	13	.188	9	–	18	.333
† 1999 SoCon Tournament winner As of April 30, 1999; Rankings from AP poll

The 1999 Southern Conference men's basketball tournament took place from February 25–28, 1999, at the Greensboro Coliseum in Greensboro, North Carolina. The College of Charleston Cougars, led by head coach John Kresse, won their first Southern Conference title and received the automatic berth to the 1999 NCAA tournament.

== Format ==
All twelve teams were eligible for the tournament. The tournament used a preset bracket consisting of four rounds, the first of which featured four games, with the winners moving on to the quarterfinal round. The top two finishers in each division received first round byes.

== Bracket ==
First round February 25
4N	VMI	49
5S	Furman	57
3S	Wofford	64
6N	Western Carolina	67
4S	Georgia Southern	81
5N	UNC Greensboro	78
3N	East Tennessee St.	72
6S	The Citadel	59

Quarterfinals; February 26
1S	#17 Coll. of Charleston	98
5S	Furman	74
2N	Davidson	77
6N	Western Carolina	82
1N	Appalachian State	74
4S	Georgia Southern	65
2S	Chattanooga	77
3N	East Tennessee St.	65

Semifinals; February 27
1S	#17 Coll. of Charleston	80
6N	Western Carolina	49
1N	Appalachian State	94**
2S	Chattanooga	91

Finals; February 28
1N	Appalachian State	67
1S	#17 Coll. of Charleston	77

* Overtime game

== See also ==
- List of Southern Conference men's basketball champions
