= 1994–95 Chattanooga Mocs basketball team =

American college basketball season

1994–95 Chattanooga Mocs basketball

SoCon regular season champion SoCon tournament champion

NCAA tournament
- Conference: Southern Conference
- South
- Record: 19–11 (11–3 SoCon)
- Head coach: Mack McCarthy (10th season)
- Home arena: UTC Arena

1994–95 Southern Conference men's basketball standings
| | Conf. | | | | Overall |
| Team | W | | L | PCT | W | | L | PCT |
|---|---|---|---|---|---|---|---|---|
North
| Marshall | 10 | – | 4 | .714 | 18 | – | 9 | .667 |
| East Tennessee State | 9 | – | 5 | .643 | 14 | – | 14 | .500 |
| Davidson | 7 | – | 7 | .500 | 14 | – | 13 | .519 |
| VMI | 6 | – | 8 | .429 | 10 | – | 17 | .370 |
| Appalachian State | 4 | – | 10 | .286 | 9 | – | 20 | .310 |
South
| Chattanooga † | 11 | – | 3 | .786 | 19 | – | 11 | .633 |
| Western Carolina | 8 | – | 6 | .571 | 14 | – | 14 | .500 |
| The Citadel | 6 | – | 8 | .429 | 11 | – | 16 | .407 |
| Furman | 6 | – | 8 | .429 | 10 | – | 17 | .370 |
| Georgia Southern | 3 | – | 11 | .214 | 8 | – | 20 | .286 |
† SoCon Tournament winner As of April 30, 1995; Rankings from AP poll

The 1994–95 Chattanooga Mocs basketball team represented the University of Tennessee at Chattanooga as a member of the Southern Conference during the 1994–95 NCAA Division I men's basketball season. Their head coach was Mack McCarthy and the team played their home games at the UTC Arena. After finishing atop the conference regular season standings, the Mocs won the SoCon tournament, earning an automatic bid to the 1995 NCAA tournament. Chattanooga was beaten in the opening round by No. 2 seed Connecticut, 100–71.

== Roster ==
1994–95 Chattanooga Mocs men's basketball team
Players
Coaches

| Pos. | # | Name | Height | Weight | Year | Previous school | Hometown |
|---|---|---|---|---|---|---|---|
| F | 4 | Terrell Owens | 6 ft 3 in (1.91 m) | 200 lb (91 kg) | Jr | Benjamin Russell | Alexander City, Alabama |
| G/F | 5 | Rodney Lemons | 6 ft 4 in (1.93 m) | 188 lb (85 kg) | Fr | Beachwood | Shaker Heights, Ohio |
| G | 11 | Lincoln Walters | 6 ft 2 in (1.88 m) | 167 lb (76 kg) | Fr | University Christian | Jacksonville, Florida |
| G | 12 | Julius Poole | 6 ft 2 in (1.88 m) | 177 lb (80 kg) | Jr | J. W. Sexton | Benton Harbor, Michigan |
| G | 20 | Shane Neal | 6 ft 2 in (1.88 m) | 150 lb (68 kg) | RS Sr | Alan C. Pope | Marietta, Georgia |
| G | 21 | Bernard Smith | 6 ft 2 in (1.88 m) | 215 lb (98 kg) | Fr | Vanguard | Ocala, Florida |
| F | 22 | Patrick Henderson | 6 ft 8 in (2.03 m) | 205 lb (93 kg) | Jr | Southeast | Bradenton, Florida |
| G | 23 | Fred Moore | 6 ft 3 in (1.91 m) | 185 lb (84 kg) | Sr | Sparkman | Toney, Alabama |
| F | 24 | Isaac Conner | 6 ft 6 in (1.98 m) | 185 lb (84 kg) | Fr | Powell | Powell, Tennessee |
| G | 30 | Marcus Watkins | 6 ft 2 in (1.88 m) | 162 lb (73 kg) | Jr | Columbus | Columbus, Georgia |
| F | 31 | Maurio Hanson | 6 ft 5 in (1.96 m) | 230 lb (104 kg) | Sr | Garinger | Charlotte, North Carolina |
| F | 32 | Brandon Born | 6 ft 7 in (2.01 m) | 185 lb (84 kg) | RS Sr | Ringgold | Ringgold, Georgia |
| F | 40 | Julian Scott | 6 ft 7 in (2.01 m) | 245 lb (111 kg) | Fr | North Marion | Reddick, Florida |
| C | 42 | Roger Smith | 6 ft 10 in (2.08 m) | 240 lb (109 kg) | Sr | Ringgold (FL) | Miami, Florida |
| G/F | 44 | John Oliver | 6 ft 5 in (1.96 m) | 200 lb (91 kg) | So | Francis Marion | Marion, Alabama |
| F | 50 | Hiram Thomas | 6 ft 8 in (2.03 m) | 185 lb (84 kg) | So | Groveport Madison | Groveport, Ohio |
| F | 55 | Akintoye Oloko | 6 ft 6 in (1.98 m) | 195 lb (88 kg) | So | International School | Lagos, Nigeria |

Head coach

- Mack McCarthy

Assistant coach(es)

Legend

- (C) Team captain
- (S) Suspended
- (I) Ineligible
- (W) Walk-on
- Injured
- Current redshirt

Roster

== Schedule and results ==
| Date time, TV | Rank^{#} | Opponent^{#} | Result | Record | Site (attendance) city, state |
Regular season
| Nov 26, 1994* | | USC Aiken | W 94–76 | 1–0 | UTC Arena; Chattanooga, Tennessee |
| Nov 29, 1994* | | at Southern Miss | L 63–68 | 1–1 | Reed Green Coliseum; Hattiesburg, Mississippi |
| Dec 3, 1994* | | No. 17 Michigan | L 71–83 | 1–2 | UTC Arena; Chattanooga, Tennessee |
| Dec 5, 1994* | | at Tennessee State | L 75–86 | 1–3 | Gentry Complex; Nashville, Tennessee |
| Dec 15, 1994* | | at Ohio State | L 83–84 ^{OT} | 1–4 | St. John Arena; Columbus, Ohio |
| Dec 18, 1994* | | Catawba | W 109–89 | 2–4 | UTC Arena; Chattanooga, Tennessee |
| Dec 20, 1994* | | Alabama State | W 88–68 | 3–4 | UTC Arena; Chattanooga, Tennessee |
| Dec 22, 1994* | | Purdue | L 77–94 | 3–5 | UTC Arena; Chattanooga, Tennessee |
| Dec 29, 1994* | | Liberty | W 64–62 | 4–5 | UTC Arena; Chattanooga, Tennessee |
| Dec 30, 1994* | | Charleston | W 56–54 | 5–5 | UTC Arena; Chattanooga, Tennessee |
| Jan 5, 1995* | | at Memphis | L 76–82 | 5–6 | Pyramid Arena; Memphis, Tennessee |
| Jan 7, 1995* | | at Marshall | L 83–95 | 5–7 | Cam Henderson Center; Huntington, West Virginia |
| Jan 14, 1995 | | The Citadel | W 105–68 | 6–7 (1–0) | UTC Arena; Chattanooga, Tennessee |
| Jan 16, 1995 | | at Western Carolina | L 68–69 | 6–8 (1–1) | Ramsey Center; Cullowhee, North Carolina |
| Jan 21, 1995 | | at Georgia Southern | W 89–70 | 7–8 (2–1) | Hanner Fieldhouse; Statesboro, Georgia |
| Jan 23, 1995 | | Marshall | W 80–63 | 8–8 (3–1) | UTC Arena; Chattanooga, Tennessee |
| Jan 28, 1995 | | at Furman | W 72–67 | 9–8 (4–1) | Greenville Memorial Auditorium; Greenville, South Carolina |
| Jan 30, 1995 | | at VMI | L 63–72 | 9–9 (4–2) | Cameron Hall; Lexington, Virginia |
| Feb 4, 1995 | | East Tennessee State | W 87–76 | 10–9 (5–2) | UTC Arena; Chattanooga, Tennessee |
| Feb 7, 1995 | | at Davidson | W 71–62 | 11–9 (6–2) | John M. Belk Arena; Davidson, North Carolina |
| Feb 11, 1995 | | Furman | W 71–70 | 12–9 (7–2) | UTC Arena; Chattanooga, Tennessee |
| Feb 13, 1995 | | Western Carolina | W 76–65 | 13–9 (8–2) | UTC Arena; Chattanooga, Tennessee |
| Feb 18, 1995 | | Georgia Southern | W 76–62 | 14–9 (9–2) | UTC Arena; Chattanooga, Tennessee |
| Feb 20, 1995 | | Appalachian State | W 68–54 | 15–9 (10–2) | UTC Arena; Chattanooga, Tennessee |
| Feb 25, 1995 | | at The Citadel | W 72–48 | 16–9 (11–2) | McAlister Field House; Charleston, South Carolina |
| Feb 27, 1995 | | at East Tennessee State | L 82–87 | 16–10 (11–3) | Memorial Center; Johnson City, Tennessee |
SoCon tournament
| Mar 3, 1995* | (1S) | vs. (5S) Georgia Southern; Quarterfinals | W 70–66 | 17–10 | Asheville Civic Center; Asheville, North Carolina |
| Mar 4, 1995* | (1S) | vs. (2N) East Tennessee State; Semifinals | W 71–69 | 18–10 | Asheville Civic Center; Asheville, North Carolina |
| Mar 5, 1995* | (1S) | vs. (2S) Western Carolina; Championship game | W 63–61 | 19–10 | Asheville Civic Center; Asheville, North Carolina |
NCAA tournament
| Mar 16, 1995*; CBS | (15 W) | vs. (2 W) No. 8 Connecticut; First round | L 71–100 | 19–11 | Jon M. Huntsman Center (11,790); Salt Lake City, Utah |
*Non-conference game. ^{#}Rankings from AP poll. (#) Tournament seedings in parentheses. W=West. All times are in Eastern Time.
