= 1995 Southern Conference men's basketball tournament =

- Classification: Division I
- Season: 1994–95
- Teams: 10
- Site: Asheville Civic Center; Asheville, NC
- Champions: Chattanooga (7th title)
- Winning coach: Mack McCarthy (4th title)

1994–95 Southern Conference men's basketball standings
	Conf.				Overall
Team	W		L	PCT	W		L	PCT
North
Marshall	10	–	4	.714	18	–	9	.667
East Tennessee State	9	–	5	.643	14	–	14	.500
Davidson	7	–	7	.500	14	–	13	.519
VMI	6	–	8	.429	10	–	17	.370
Appalachian State	4	–	10	.286	9	–	20	.310
South
Chattanooga †	11	–	3	.786	19	–	11	.633
Western Carolina	8	–	6	.571	14	–	14	.500
The Citadel	6	–	8	.429	11	–	16	.407
Furman	6	–	8	.429	10	–	17	.370
Georgia Southern	3	–	11	.214	8	–	20	.286
† SoCon Tournament winner As of April 30, 1995; Rankings from AP poll

The 1995 Southern Conference men's basketball tournament took place from March 2–5, 1995 at the Asheville Civic Center in Asheville, North Carolina. The Chattanooga Mocs, led by head coach Mack McCarthy, won their seventh Southern Conference title and received the automatic berth to the 1995 NCAA tournament.

== Format ==
This was the first year in which the conference utilized a division format, with five teams divided into two divisions, the "North" and "South". All of the conference's ten members were eligible for the tournament. Teams were seeded based on conference winning percentage. The tournament used a preset bracket consisting of four rounds, the first of which featured two games, with the winners moving on to the quarterfinal round.

== Bracket ==
First round March 2
4N	VMI	71
5S	Georgia Southern	94
4S	Furman	73
5N	Appalachian State	78

Quarterfinals; March 3
1S	Chattanooga	70
5S	Georgia Southern	66
2N	East Tennessee St.	85
3S	The Citadel	65
1N	Marshall	82
5N	Appalachian State	93
2S	Western Carolina	78
3N	Davidson	74

Semifinals; March 4
1S	Chattanooga	71
2N	East Tennessee St.	69
2S	Western Carolina	74
5N	Appalachian State	64

Finals; March 5
1S	Chattanooga	63
2S	Western Carolina	61

* Overtime game

== See also ==
- List of Southern Conference men's basketball champions
