= The Citadel Bulldogs basketball, 1995–1999 =

The Citadel Bulldogs basketball teams represented The Citadel, The Military College of South Carolina in Charleston, South Carolina, United States. The program was established in 1900–01, and has continuously fielded a team since 1912–13. Their primary rivals are College of Charleston, Furman and VMI.

== 1994–95 ==
1994–1995 The Citadel Bulldogs men's basketball
- Conference: Southern Conference
- South Division
- Record: 11–16 (6–8 SoCon)
- Head coach: Pat Dennis
- Home arena: McAlister Field House

1994–95 Southern Conference men's basketball standings
	Conf.				Overall
Team	W		L	PCT	W		L	PCT
North
Marshall	10	–	4	.714	18	–	9	.667
East Tennessee State	9	–	5	.643	14	–	14	.500
Davidson	7	–	7	.500	14	–	13	.519
VMI	6	–	8	.429	10	–	17	.370
Appalachian State	4	–	10	.286	9	–	20	.310
South
Chattanooga †	11	–	3	.786	19	–	11	.633
Western Carolina	8	–	6	.571	14	–	14	.500
The Citadel	6	–	8	.429	11	–	16	.407
Furman	6	–	8	.429	10	–	17	.370
Georgia Southern	3	–	11	.214	8	–	20	.286
† SoCon Tournament winner As of April 30, 1995; Rankings from AP poll

Date time, TV	Opponent	Result	Record	Site city, state
November 26*	North Carolina Wesleyan	W 96–71	1–0	McAlister Field House; Charleston, South Carolina
November 29*	at William & Mary	W 96–71	2–0	Kaplan Arena; Williamsburg, Virginia
December 3*	Charleston Southern	L 69–84	2–1	McAlister Field House; Charleston, South Carolina
December 6*	Winthrop	L 74–78	2–2	McAlister Field House; Charleston, South Carolina
December 8*	Randolph–Macon	W 85–57	3–2	McAlister Field House; Charleston, South Carolina
December 18*	at Clemson	L 66–77	3–3	Littlejohn Coliseum; Clemson, South Carolina
December 20*	at No. 19 Wake Forest	L 58–81	3–4	LJVM Coliseum; Winston–Salem, North Carolina
December 29*	vs. Air Force; Cessna Classic	W 65–61	4–4	Levitt Arena; Wichita, Kansas
December 30*	at Wichita State; Cessna Classic	L 62–64 ^{OT}	4–5	Levitt Arena; Wichita, Kansas
January 4*	at Charleston Southern	L 53–55	4–6	CSU Field House; North Charleston, South Carolina
January 9*	Newberry	W 85–69	5–6	McAlister Field House; Charleston, South Carolina
January 14	at Chattanooga	L 68–105	5–7 (0–1)	McKenzie Arena; Chattanooga, Tennessee
January 17	Georgia Southern	W 69–62	6–7 (1–1)	McAlister Field House; Charleston, South Carolina
January 21	at Appalachian State	L 57–74	6–8 (1–2)	Varsity Gymnasium; Boone, North Carolina
January 23	at Furman	L 62–77	6–9 (1–3)	Greenville Memorial Auditorium; Greenville, South Carolina
January 28	Western Carolina	W 98–90 ^{OT}	7–9 (2–3)	McAlister Field House; Charleston, South Carolina
January 30	at East Tennessee State	L 58–76	7–10 (2–4)	Memorial Center; Johnson City, Tennessee
February 4	Marshall	L 62–78	7–11 (2–5)	McAlister Field House; Charleston, South Carolina
February 6	VMI	W 84–69	8–11 (3–5)	McAlister Field House; Charleston, South Carolina
February 11	at Western Carolina	W 69–68	9–11 (4–5)	Ramsey Center; Cullowhee, North Carolina
February 14	at Georgia Southern	W 69–62	10–11 (5–5)	Hanner Fieldhouse; Statesboro, Georgia
February 18	Davidson	L 51–70	10–12 (5–6)	McAlister Field House; Charleston, South Carolina
February 20	Furman	W 72–64	11–12 (6–6)	McAlister Field House; Charleston, South Carolina
February 23*	at College of Charleston	L 58–65	11–13	John Kresse Arena; Charleston, South Carolina
February 25	Chattanooga	L 48–72	11–14 (6–7)	McAlister Field House; Charleston, South Carolina
February 27	VMI	L 66–75	11–15 (6–8)	Cameron Hall; Lexington, Virginia
1995 Southern Conference men's basketball tournament
March 3	vs. East Tennessee State	L 65–85	11–16	Asheville Civic Center; Asheville, North Carolina
*Non-conference game. (#) Tournament seedings in parentheses. All times are in Eastern Time.

== 1995–96 ==
1995–1996 The Citadel Bulldogs men's basketball
- Conference: Southern Conference
- South Division
- Record: 10–16 (5–9 SoCon)
- Head coach: Pat Dennis
- Home arena: McAlister Field House

1995–96 Southern Conference men's basketball standings
	Conf.				Overall
Team	W		L	PCT	W		L	PCT
North
Davidson	14	–	0	1.000	25	–	5	.833
VMI	10	–	4	.714	18	–	10	.643
Marshall	8	–	6	.571	17	–	11	.607
East Tennessee State	3	–	11	.214	7	–	20	.259
Appalachian State	3	–	11	.214	8	–	21	.276
South
Western Carolina †	10	–	4	.714	17	–	13	.567
Chattanooga	9	–	5	.643	15	–	12	.556
Furman	6	–	8	.429	10	–	17	.370
The Citadel	5	–	9	.357	10	–	16	.385
Georgia Southern	2	–	12	.143	3	–	23	.115
† SoCon Tournament winner As of April 30, 1996; Rankings from AP poll

Date time, TV	Opponent	Result	Record	Site city, state
November 27*	Newberry	W 94–65	1–0	McAlister Field House; Charleston, South Carolina
November 29*	Charleston Southern	W 96–90 ^{OT}	2–0	McAlister Field House; Charleston, South Carolina
December 2*	Randolph–Macon	W 65–58	3–0	McAlister Field House; Charleston, South Carolina
December 5*	Hampton	L 66–83	3–1	McAlister Field House; Charleston, South Carolina
December 8*	vs. Bowling Green; Indiana Classic	L 56–79	3–2	Assembly Hall; Bloomington, Indiana
December 9*	vs. Delaware; Indiana Classic	L 46–68	3–3	Assembly Hall; Bloomington, Indiana
December 18*	St. Mary's (MD)	W 102–53	4–3	McAlister Field House; Charleston, South Carolina
December 21*	at South Carolina	L 61–112	4–4	Carolina Coliseum; Columbia, South Carolina
January 3*	at Charleston Southern	L 74–82	4–5	CSU Field House; North Charleston, South Carolina
January 10*	at Winthrop	W 68–62	5–5	Winthrop Coliseum; Rock Hill, South Carolina
January 13	Chattanooga	W 73–64	6–5 (1–0)	McAlister Field House; Charleston, South Carolina
January 15	at Georgia Southern	W 63–56	7–5 (2–0)	Hanner Fieldhouse; Statesboro, Georgia
January 20	Appalachian State	W 84–75 ^{OT}	8–5 (3–0)	McAlister Field House; Charleston, South Carolina
January 22	Furman	W 88–77	9–5 (4–0)	McAlister Field House; Charleston, South Carolina
January 25*	College of Charleston	L 69–76	9–6	McAlister Field House; Charleston, South Carolina
January 27	at Western Carolina	L 73–74	9–7 (4–1)	Ramsey Center; Cullowhee, North Carolina
January 29	East Tennessee State	L 49–64	9–8 (4–2)	McAlister Field House; Charleston, South Carolina
February 3	at Marshall	L 54–98	9–9 (4–3)	Cam Henderson Center; Huntington, West Virginia
February 5	at VMI	L 52–91	9–10 (4–3)	Cameron Hall; Lexington, Virginia
February 10	Western Carolina	L 73–74	9–11 (4–4)	McAlister Field House; Charleston, South Carolina
February 12	Georgia Southern	W 67–63 ^{OT}	10–11 (5–4)	McAlister Field House; Charleston, South Carolina
February 17	at Davidson	L 54–82	10–12 (5–5)	John M. Belk Arena; Davidson, North Carolina
February 19	at Furman	L 67–68	10–13 (5–6)	Greenville Memorial Auditorium; Greenville, South Carolina
February 24	at Chattanooga	L 44–70	10–14 (5–7)	McKenzie Arena; Chattanooga, Tennessee
February 26	VMI	L 83–85	10–15 (5–8)	McAlister Field House; Charleston, South Carolina
1996 Southern Conference men's basketball tournament
February 29	vs. Appalachian State	L 73–75	10–16	Greensboro Coliseum; Greensboro, North Carolina
*Non-conference game. (#) Tournament seedings in parentheses. All times are in Eastern Time.

== 1996–97 ==
1996–1997 The Citadel Bulldogs men's basketball
- Conference: Southern Conference
- South Division
- Record: 13–14 (6–8 SoCon)
- Head coach: Pat Dennis
- Home arena: McAlister Field House

1996–97 Southern Conference men's basketball standings
	Conf.				Overall
Team	W		L	PCT	W		L	PCT
North
Marshall	10	–	4	.714	20	–	9	.690
Davidson	10	–	4	.714	18	–	10	.643
Appalachian State	8	–	6	.571	14	–	14	.500
VMI	7	–	7	.500	12	–	16	.429
East Tennessee State	2	–	12	.143	7	–	20	.259
South
Chattanooga†	11	–	3	.786	24	–	11	.686
Western Carolina	7	–	7	.500	14	–	13	.519
The Citadel	6	–	8	.429	13	–	14	.481
Georgia Southern	5	–	9	.357	10	–	18	.357
Furman	4	–	10	.286	10	–	17	.370
† SoCon Tournament winner As of April 30, 1997; Rankings from AP poll

Date time, TV	Opponent	Result	Record	Site city, state
November 22*	Limestone	W 83–56	1–0	McAlister Field House; Charleston, South Carolina
November 25*	No. 3 Wake Forest	L 52–86	1–1	McAlister Field House; Charleston, South Carolina
November 27*	Greensboro	W 84–53	2–1	McAlister Field House; Charleston, South Carolina
November 30*	William & Mary	W 78–71	3–1	Kaplan Arena; Williamsburg, Virginia
December 3*	Anderson	W 103–52	4–1	McAlister Field House; Charleston, South Carolina
December 7*	at College of Charleston	L 63–68	4–2	John Kresse Arena; Charleston, South Carolina
December 12*	Winthrop	W 86–62	5–2	McAlister Field House; Charleston, South Carolina
December 13*	Wingate	W 82–55	6–2	McAlister Field House; Charleston, South Carolina
December 21*	Charleston Southern	W 86–80 ^{OT}	7–2	McAlister Field House; Charleston, South Carolina
December 30*	at Stetson	L 50–52	7–3	Edmunds Center; DeLand, Florida
January 2*	at Charleston Southern	L 61–77	7–4	CSU Field House; North Charleston, South Carolina
January 6	Western Carolina	W 82–62	8–4 (1–0)	McAlister Field House; Charleston, South Carolina
January 11	at East Tennessee State	W 63–56	9–4 (2–0)	Memorial Center; Johnson City, Tennessee
January 13	Marshall	L 80–81	9–5 (2–1)	McAlister Field House; Charleston, South Carolina
January 18	VMI	L 76–86	9–6 (2–2)	McAlister Field House; Charleston, South Carolina
January 20	at Western Carolina	L 57–76	9–7 (2–3)	Ramsey Center; Cullowhee, North Carolina
January 25	at Georgia Southern	L 56–68	9–8 (2–4)	Hanner Fieldhouse; Statesboro, Georgia
January 27	Davidson	L 58–63	9–9 (2–5)	McAlister Field House; Charleston, South Carolina
February 1	Furman	W 71–68	10–9 (3–5)	McAlister Field House; Charleston, South Carolina
February 3	Chattanooga	L 66–72	10–10 (3–6)	McAlister Field House; Charleston, South Carolina
February 8	at VMI	W 81–74	11–10 (4–6)	Cameron Hall; Lexington, Virginia
February 10	at Chattanooga	L 59–71	11–11 (4–7)	McKenzie Arena; Chattanooga, Tennessee
February 15	Georgia Southern	W 93–56	12–11 (5–7)	McAlister Field House; Charleston, South Carolina
February 17	at Appalachian State	L 63–74	12–12 (5–8)	Varsity Gymnasium; Boone, North Carolina
February 20*	South Carolina	L 55–85	12–13	McAlister Field House; Charleston, South Carolina
February 22	at Furman	W 83–70	13–13 (6–8)	Herman W. Lay Physical Activities Center; Greenville, South Carolina
1997 Southern Conference men's basketball tournament
February 28	vs. Davidson	L 61–83	13–14	Greensboro Coliseum; Greensboro, North Carolina
*Non-conference game. (#) Tournament seedings in parentheses. All times are in Eastern Time.

== 1997–98 ==
1997–1998 The Citadel Bulldogs men's basketball
- Conference: Southern Conference
- South Division
- Record: 15–13 (6–8 SoCon)
- Head coach: Pat Dennis
- Home arena: McAlister Field House

1997–98 Southern Conference men's basketball standings
	Conf.				Overall
Team	W		L	PCT	W		L	PCT
North
Davidson †	13	–	2	.867	20	–	10	.667
Appalachian State	13	–	2	.867	21	–	8	.724
VMI	8	–	7	.533	14	–	13	.519
Western Carolina	6	–	9	.400	12	–	15	.444
East Tennessee State	6	–	9	.400	11	–	16	.407
UNC Greensboro	6	–	9	.400	9	–	19	.321
South
Chattanooga	7	–	7	.500	13	–	15	.464
Wofford	6	–	8	.429	9	–	18	.333
The Citadel	6	–	8	.429	15	–	13	.536
Georgia Southern	5	–	9	.357	9	–	20	.310
Furman	4	–	10	.286	10	–	18	.357
† 1998 SoCon Tournament winner As of April 30, 1998; Rankings from AP poll

Date time, TV	Opponent	Result	Record	Site city, state
November 14*	Francis Marion	L 58–66	0–1	McAlister Field House; Charleston, South Carolina
November 17*	at Notre Dame	L 53–72	0–2	Joyce Center; South Bend, Indiana
November 21*	at No. 6 South Carolina	L 55–77	0–3	Carolina Coliseum; Columbia, South Carolina
November 25*	Charleston Southern	W 77–56	1–3	CSU Field House; North Charleston, South Carolina
December 1*	North Carolina Wesleyan	W 77–43	2–3	McAlister Field House; Charleston, South Carolina
December 3*	Charleston Southern	W 79–69	3–3	McAlister Field House; Charleston, South Carolina
December 6*	at College of Charleston	L 44–56	3–4	John Kresse Arena; Charleston, South Carolina
December 9*	at Winthrop	W 64–56	4–4	Winthrop Coliseum; Rock Hill, South Carolina
December 13*	Stetson	W 77–64	5–4	McAlister Field House; Charleston, South Carolina
December 20*	Greensboro	W 89–57	6–4	McAlister Field House; Charleston, South Carolina
January 3	at UNC Greensboro	L 61–69	6–5 (0–1)	Greensboro Coliseum; Greensboro, North Carolina
January 5	Davidson	W 74–59	7–5 (1–1)	McAlister Field House; Charleston, South Carolina
January 10	at Chattanooga	L 54–66	7–6 (1–2)	McKenzie Arena; Chattanooga, Tennessee
January 12*	College of Charleston	W 64–63	8–6	McAlister Field House; Charleston, South Carolina
January 17	Georgia Southern	W 71–60	9–6 (2–2)	McAlister Field House; Charleston, South Carolina
January 19	at VMI	W 67–62	10–6 (3–2)	Cameron Hall; Lexington, Virginia
January 21	Furman	L 57–59	10–7 (3–3)	McAlister Field House; Charleston, South Carolina
January 24*	Anderson	W 87–65	11–7	McAlister Field House; Charleston, South Carolina
January 26	Wofford	W 56–51	12–7 (4–3)	McAlister Field House; Charleston, South Carolina
January 31	at Georgia Southern	W 68–45	13–7 (5–3)	Hanner Fieldhouse; Statesboro, Georgia
February 2	at Furman	L 54–58	13–8 (5–4)	Timmons Arena; Greenville, South Carolina
February 7	East Tennessee State	L 57–72	13–9 (5–5)	McAlister Field House; Charleston, South Carolina
February 9	Chattanooga	L 55–62	13–10 (5–6)	McAlister Field House; Charleston, South Carolina
February 14	at Western Carolina	W 73–65 ^{OT}	14–10 (6–6)	Ramsey Center; Cullowhee, North Carolina
February 16	Appalachian State	L 53–60	14–11 (6–7)	McAlister Field House; Charleston, South Carolina
February 21	at Wofford	L 66–71	14–12 (6–8)	Benjamin Johnson Arena; Spartanburg, South Carolina
1998 Southern Conference men's basketball tournament
February 27	vs. VMI	W 77–66	15–12	Greensboro Coliseum; Greensboro, North Carolina
February 28	vs. Davidson	L 59–68	15–13	Greensboro Coliseum; Greensboro, North Carolina
*Non-conference game. (#) Tournament seedings in parentheses. All times are in Eastern Time.

== 1998–99 ==
1998–1999 The Citadel Bulldogs men's basketball
- Conference: Southern Conference
- South Division
- Record: 9–18 (3–13 SoCon)
- Head coach: Pat Dennis
- Home arena: McAlister Field House

1998–99 Southern Conference men's basketball standings
	Conf.				Overall
Team	W		L	PCT	W		L	PCT
North
Appalachian State	13	–	3	.813	21	–	8	.724
Davidson	11	–	5	.688	16	–	11	.593
East Tennessee State	9	–	7	.563	17	–	11	.607
VMI	9	–	7	.563	12	–	15	.444
UNC Greensboro	5	–	11	.313	7	–	20	.259
Western Carolina	2	–	14	.125	8	–	21	.276
South
No. 16 College of Charleston †	16	–	0	1.000	28	–	3	.903
Chattanooga	9	–	7	.563	16	–	12	.571
Wofford	8	–	8	.500	11	–	16	.407
Georgia Southern	6	–	10	.375	11	–	17	.393
Furman	5	–	11	.313	12	–	16	.429
The Citadel	3	–	13	.188	9	–	18	.333
† 1999 SoCon Tournament winner As of April 30, 1999; Rankings from AP poll

Date time, TV	Opponent	Result	Record	Site city, state
November 17*	Anderson	W 83–52	1–0	McAlister Field House; Charleston, South Carolina
November 20*	at Georgia Tech	L 50–73	1–1	Alexander Memorial Coliseum; Atlanta
November 23*	Toccoa Falls	W 114–57	2–1	McAlister Field House; Charleston, South Carolina
November 28*	at South Carolina	L 58–71	2–2	Carolina Coliseum; Columbia, South Carolina
December 2*	William & Mary	W 62–59 ^{OT}	3–2	McAlister Field House; Charleston, South Carolina
December 5*	at Stetson	L 60–83	3–3	Edmunds Center; DeLand, Florida
December 8*	Winthrop	L 49–64	3–4	McAlister Field House; Charleston, South Carolina
December 12*	Lynchburg	W 58–47	4–4	McAlister Field House; Charleston, South Carolina
December 19*	Sewanee	W 77–54	5–4	McAlister Field House; Charleston, South Carolina
December 21*	at Coastal Carolina	W 76–68	6–4	Kimbel Arena; Conway, South Carolina
December 29	at Appalachian State	L 65–81	6–5 (0–1)	Varsity Gymnasium; Boone, North Carolina
January 4	at Furman	L 47–69	6–6 (0–2)	Timmons Arena; Greenville, South Carolina
January 9	at College of Charleston	L 39–62	6–7 (0–3)	John Kresse Arena; Charleston, South Carolina
January 11	Georgia Southern	L 51–75	6–8 (0–4)	McAlister Field House; Charleston, South Carolina
January 13	UNC Greensboro	L 53–61	6–9 (0–5)	McAlister Field House; Charleston, South Carolina
January 16	at Chattanooga	L 52–61	6–10 (0–6)	McAlister Field House; Charleston, South Carolina
January 18	at Davidson	L 60–70	6–11 (0–7)	John M. Belk Arena; Davidson, North Carolina
January 23	Furman	W 83–73 ^{OT}	7–11 (1–7)	McAlister Field House; Charleston, South Carolina
January 25	at East Tennessee State	L 73–86	7–12 (1–8)	Memorial Center; Johnson City, Tennessee
January 30	at Wofford	W 62–60	8–12 (2–8)	Benjamin Johnson Arena; Spartanburg, South Carolina
February 1	VMI	L 72–74 ^{OT}	8–13 (2–9)	McAlister Field House; Charleston, South Carolina
February 6	at No. 22 College of Charleston	L 39–60	8–14 (2–10)	McAlister Field House; Charleston, South Carolina
February 9	at Chattanooga	L 48–61	8–15 (2–11)	McKenzie Arena; Chattanooga, Tennessee
February 13	Western Carolina	W 86–82	9–15 (3–11)	McAlister Field House; Charleston, South Carolina
February 20	at Wofford	L 54–67	9–16 (3–12)	McAlister Field House; Charleston, South Carolina
February 15	at Georgia Southern	L 54–67	9–17 (3–13)	Hanner Fieldhouse; Statesboro, Georgia
1999 Southern Conference men's basketball tournament
February 25	vs. East Tennessee State	L 59–72	9–18	Greensboro Coliseum; Greensboro, North Carolina
*Non-conference game. (#) Tournament seedings in parentheses. All times are in Eastern Time.
