= 1995–96 Marshall Thundering Herd men's basketball team =

American college basketball season

1995–96 Marshall Thundering Herd men's basketball
- Conference: Southern Conference
- Record: 17–11 (9–6 SoCon)
- Head coach: Billy Donovan (2nd season)
- Assistant coaches: Anthony Grant; John Pelphrey; Donnie Jones
- Home arena: Cam Henderson Center

1995–96 Southern Conference men's basketball standings
| | Conf. | | | | Overall |
| Team | W | | L | PCT | W | | L | PCT |
|---|---|---|---|---|---|---|---|---|
North
| Davidson | 14 | – | 0 | 1.000 | 25 | – | 5 | .833 |
| VMI | 10 | – | 4 | .714 | 18 | – | 10 | .643 |
| Marshall | 8 | – | 6 | .571 | 17 | – | 11 | .607 |
| East Tennessee State | 3 | – | 11 | .214 | 7 | – | 20 | .259 |
| Appalachian State | 3 | – | 11 | .214 | 8 | – | 21 | .276 |
South
| Western Carolina † | 10 | – | 4 | .714 | 17 | – | 13 | .567 |
| Chattanooga | 9 | – | 5 | .643 | 15 | – | 12 | .556 |
| Furman | 6 | – | 8 | .429 | 10 | – | 17 | .370 |
| The Citadel | 5 | – | 9 | .357 | 10 | – | 16 | .385 |
| Georgia Southern | 2 | – | 12 | .143 | 3 | – | 23 | .115 |
† SoCon Tournament winner As of April 30, 1996; Rankings from AP poll

The 1995–96 Marshall Thundering Herd men's basketball team represented Marshall University from Huntington, West Virginia in the 1995–96 Season. Led by second year head coach Billy Donovan, the Herd finished with a final record of 17–11. Their second round elimination in the Southern Conference tournament led to the team not receiving an invitation to the NCAA tournament for the ninth consecutive year. After the season, however, Donovan left Marshall to accept a job as the new head coach of Florida, whom he would lead to national championships in 2006 and 2007. Following his tenure at Florida, which would end in 2015, Donovan would become the head coach of the NBA's Oklahoma City Thunder.

== Roster ==
1995–96 Marshall Thundering Herd men's basketball team
Players
Coaches

| Pos. | # | Name | Height | Weight | Year | Hometown |
|---|---|---|---|---|---|---|
| C | | Chad Barry | 6 ft 6 in (1.98 m) | — | Sr |
| F | | John Brannen | — | — | Jr |
| C | | John Brown | — | — | So |
| G | | Sidney Coles | 6 ft 6 in (1.98 m) | — | Jr |
| G | | Chris Gray | — | — | So |
| F | | Carlton King | 6 ft 5 in (1.96 m) | — | Fr |
| G | | Frank Lee | 6 ft 1 in (1.85 m) | — | Fr |
| F | | Refiloe Lethunya | 6 ft 8 in (2.03 m) | — | Fr |
| G | | Keith Veney | 6 ft 2 in (1.88 m) | — | Jr |
| G | | Jason Williams | 6 ft 1 in (1.85 m) | — | Fr |

Head coach

- Billy Donovan

Assistant coach(es)

- Anthony Grant
- John Pelphrey
- Donnie Jones

Legend

- (C) Team captain
- (S) Suspended
- (I) Ineligible
- (W) Walk-on
- Injured
- Current redshirt

== Schedule and results ==
| Date time, TV | Rank^{#} | Opponent^{#} | Result | Record | Site city, state |
Regular season
| Nov 25, 1995* | | Milligan | W 124–71 | 1–0 | Cam Henderson Center; Huntington, WV |
| Nov 28, 1995 | | at Chattanooga | W 95–86 | 2–0 | McKenzie Arena; Chattanooga, TN |
| Dec 2, 1995* | | at Kansas State | L 88–106 | 2–1 | Bramlage Coliseum; Manhattan, KS |
| Dec 8, 1995* | | at Morehead State | W 92–85 | 3–1 | Ellis Johnson Arena; Morehead, KY |
| Dec 10, 1995* | | Butler | L 92–102 | 3–2 | Cam Henderson Center; Huntington, WV |
| Dec 15, 1995* | | Louisiana–Lafayette | W 77–70 | 4–2 | Cam Henderson Center; Huntington, WV |
| Dec 19, 1995* | | vs. No. 4 Kentucky | L 99–118 | 4–3 | Freedom Hall; Louisville, KY |
| Dec 23, 1995* | | Radford | W 101–73 | 5–3 | Cam Henderson Center; Huntington, WV |
| Jan 3, 1996* | | at Nevada | L 83–92 | 5–4 | Lawlor Events Center; Reno, NV |
| Jan 6, 1996* | | Hampton | W 123–95 | 6–4 | Cam Henderson Center; Huntington, WV |
| Jan 13, 1996 | | at Appalachian State | L 87–89 | 6–5 (0–1) | Varsity Gymnasium; Boone, NC |
| Jan 12, 1987 | | VMI | W 78–71 | 7–5 (1–1) | Cam Henderson Center; Huntington, WV |
| Jan 18, 1996* | | vs. West Virginia; Capital Classic | W 91–87 | 8–5 | Charleston Civic Center; Charleston, WV |
| Jan 20, 1996 | | at East Tennessee State | L 76–82 ^{OT} | 8–6 (1–2) | Memorial Center; Johnson City, TN |
| Jan 22, 1996 | | Chattanooga | W 86–69 | 9–6 (2–2) | Cam Henderson Center; Huntington, WV |
| Jan 27, 1996 | | Davidson | L 57–106 | 9–7 (2–3) | Cam Henderson Center; Huntington, WV |
| Jan 29, 1996 | | at Furman | W 95–71 | 10–7 (3–3) | Greenville Memorial Auditorium; Greenville, SC |
| Feb 3, 1996 | | The Citadel | W 98–54 | 11–7 (4–3) | Cam Henderson Center; Huntington, WV |
| Feb 5, 1996 | | at Western Carolina | L 104–125 | 11–8 (4–4) | Ramsey Center; Cullowhee, NC |
| Feb 10, 1996 | | at Georgia Southern | W 71–52 | 12–8 (5–4) | Hanner Fieldhouse; Statesboro, GA |
| Feb 12, 1996* | | Jacksonville State | W 111–90 | 13–8 | Cam Henderson Center; Huntington, WV |
| Feb 14, 1996 | | Appalachian State | W 95–64 | 14–8 (6–4) | Cam Henderson Center; Huntington, WV |
| Feb 17, 1996 | | at VMI | L 94–103 | 14–9 (6–5) | Camron Hall; Lexington, VA |
| Feb 19, 1996 | | East Tennessee State | W 111–84 | 15–9 (7–5) | Cam Henderson Center; Huntington, WV |
| Feb 24, 1996 | | at Davidson | L 77–83 | 15–10 (7–6) | John M. Belk Arena; Davidson, NC |
| Feb 26, 1996 | | Georgia Southern | W 96–90 | 16–10 (8–6) | Cam Henderson Center; Huntington, WV |
SoCon tournament
| Mar 1, 1996 | (3 N) | vs. (2 S) Chattanooga; Quarterfinals | W 82–81 | 17–10 | Greensboro Coliseum; Greensboro, NC |
| Mar 2, 1996 | (3 N) | vs. (1 N) Davidson; Semifinals | L 77–92 | 17–11 | Greensboro Coliseum; Greensboro, NC |
*Non-conference game. ^{#}Rankings from AP Poll. (#) Tournament seedings in parentheses.
