= 1997 Southern Conference men's basketball tournament =

- Classification: Division I
- Season: 1996–97
- Teams: 10
- Site: Greensboro Coliseum; Greensboro, North Carolina
- Champions: Chattanooga (8th title)
- Winning coach: Mack McCarthy (5th title)

1996–97 Southern Conference men's basketball standings
	Conf.				Overall
Team	W		L	PCT	W		L	PCT
North
Marshall	10	–	4	.714	20	–	9	.690
Davidson	10	–	4	.714	18	–	10	.643
Appalachian State	8	–	6	.571	14	–	14	.500
VMI	7	–	7	.500	12	–	16	.429
East Tennessee State	2	–	12	.143	7	–	20	.259
South
Chattanooga†	11	–	3	.786	24	–	11	.686
Western Carolina	7	–	7	.500	14	–	13	.519
The Citadel	6	–	8	.429	13	–	14	.481
Georgia Southern	5	–	9	.357	10	–	18	.357
Furman	4	–	10	.286	10	–	17	.370
† SoCon Tournament winner As of April 30, 1997; Rankings from AP poll

The 1997 Southern Conference men's basketball tournament took place from February 27–March 2, 1997, at the Greensboro Coliseum in Greensboro, North Carolina, United States. The Chattanooga Mocs, led by head coach Mack McCarthy, won their eight Southern Conference title and received the automatic berth to the 1997 NCAA tournament.

== Format ==
All of the conference's ten members were eligible for the tournament. Teams were seeded based on conference winning percentage. The tournament used a preset bracket consisting of four rounds, the first of which featured two games, with the winners moving on to the quarterfinal round. The top three finishers in each division received first round byes.

== Bracket ==
First round February 27
4N	VMI	87*
5S	Furman	84
4S	Georgia Southern	68
5N	East Tennessee St.	48

Quarterfinals; February 28
1S	Chattanooga	84
4N	VMI	62
2N	Davidson	83
3S	The Citadel	61
1N	Marshall	78
4S	Georgia Southern	46
2S	Western Carolina	68
3N	Appalachian State	87

Semifinals; March 1
1S	Chattanooga	77
2N	Davidson	70
1N	Marshall	84
3N	Appalachian State	78

Finals; March 2
1S	Chattanooga	71*
1N	Marshall	70

* Overtime game

== See also ==
- List of Southern Conference men's basketball champions
