= 1998–99 Charleston Cougars men's basketball team =

American college basketball season

1998–99 Charleston Cougars men's basketball

SoCon Regular season champion SoCon tournament champion

NCAA tournament, first round
- Conference: Southern Conference
- South Division

Ranking
- AP: No. 16
- Record: 28–3 (16–0 SoCon)
- Head coach: John Kresse (20th season)
- Home arena: F. Mitchell Johnson Arena

1998–99 Southern Conference men's basketball standings
	Conf.				Overall
Team	W		L	PCT	W		L	PCT
North
Appalachian State	13	–	3	.813	21	–	8	.724
Davidson	11	–	5	.688	16	–	11	.593
East Tennessee State	9	–	7	.563	17	–	11	.607
VMI	9	–	7	.563	12	–	15	.444
UNC Greensboro	5	–	11	.313	7	–	20	.259
Western Carolina	2	–	14	.125	8	–	21	.276
South
No. 16 College of Charleston †	16	–	0	1.000	28	–	3	.903
Chattanooga	9	–	7	.563	16	–	12	.571
Wofford	8	–	8	.500	11	–	16	.407
Georgia Southern	6	–	10	.375	11	–	17	.393
Furman	5	–	11	.313	12	–	16	.429
The Citadel	3	–	13	.188	9	–	18	.333
† 1999 SoCon Tournament winner As of April 30, 1999; Rankings from AP poll

The 1998–99 College of Charleston Cougars men's basketball team represented the College of Charleston during the 1998–99 NCAA Division I men's basketball season. The Cougars, led by 20th-year head coach John Kresse, played their home games at F. Mitchell Johnson Arena in Charleston, South Carolina as first-year members of the Southern Conference.

After finishing atop the conference regular season standings with a peerless 16–0 mark, the Cougars also won the 1999 SoCon tournament – capping a 25-game win streak – to earn an automatic bid to the NCAA tournament as No. 8 seed in the East region. College of Charleston was beaten in the opening round by Tulsa, 62–53. The team finished with an overall record of 28–3 and were ranked No. 16 in the final AP poll.

== Roster ==
1998–99 College of Charleston Cougars men's basketball team
Players
Coaches

Pos.	#	Name	Height	Weight	Year	Previous school	Hometown
G	20	Jermel President	5 ft 11 in (1.8 m)	—	Sr	Burke	Charleston, South Carolina
F	23	Sedric Webber	6 ft 6 in (1.98 m)	195 lb (88 kg)	Sr	W. J. Keenan	Columbia, South Carolina
F	33	Jody Lumpkin	6 ft 8 in (2.03 m)	240 lb (109 kg)	So	Hammond School	Columbia, South Carolina

Head coach

- John Kresse (St. John's)

Assistant coach(es)

Legend

- (C) Team captain
- (S) Suspended
- (I) Ineligible
- (W) Walk-on
- Injured
- Current redshirt

Roster

== Schedule and results ==
Date time, TV	Rank^{#}	Opponent^{#}	Result	Record	Site (attendance) city, state
Regular season
Nov 13, 1998*		at Charleston Southern	W 64–43	1–0	Buccaneer Field House; North Charleston, South Carolina
Nov 16, 1998*		at Georgia	L 63–84	1–1	Stegeman Coliseum; Athens, Georgia
Nov 23, 1998*		Belmont Abbey	W 78–69	2–1	F. Mitchell Johnson Center; Charleston, South Carolina
Dec 1, 1998*		UMass	W 77–75	3–1	F. Mitchell Johnson Center; Charleston, South Carolina
Dec 4, 1998*		vs. South Carolina	L 44–55	3–2	Charlotte Coliseum; Charlotte, North Carolina
Dec 5, 1998*		vs. No. 3 North Carolina	W 66–64	4–2	Charlotte Coliseum; Charlotte, North Carolina
Dec 12, 1998*		George Mason	W 74–70	5–2	F. Mitchell Johnson Center; Charleston, South Carolina
Dec 22, 1998*		Delaware	W 80–55	8–2	F. Mitchell Johnson Center; Charleston, South Carolina
Jan 25, 1999		at Wofford	W 70–65	17–2 (9–0)	Benjamin Johnson Arena; Spartanburg, South Carolina
Jan 30, 1999		at Davidson	W 84–80	18–2 (10–0)	Belk Arena; Davidson, North Carolina
Feb 1, 1999	No. 22	Georgia Southern	W 66–41	19–2 (11–0)	F. Mitchell Johnson Center; Charleston, South Carolina
Feb 3, 1999*	No. 22	at Coastal Carolina	W 75–65	20–2	Kimbel Arena; Conway, South Carolina
Feb 6, 1999	No. 22	at The Citadel	W 60–39	21–2 (12–0)	McAlister Field House; Charleston, South Carolina
Feb 8, 1999	No. 20	VMI	W 85–59	22–2 (13–0)	F. Mitchell Johnson Center; Charleston, South Carolina
Feb 13, 1999	No. 20	at Chattanooga	W 58–53	23–2 (14–0)	UTC Arena; Chattanooga, Tennessee
Feb 15, 1999	No. 18	at East Tennessee State	W 74–55	24–2 (15–0)	Memorial Center; Johnson City, Tennessee
Feb 20, 1999	No. 18	Furman	W 85–63	25–2 (16–0)	F. Mitchell Johnson Center; Charleston, South Carolina
SoCon tournament
Feb 26, 1999*	No. 17	vs. Furman; Quarterfinals	W 98–74	26–2	Greensboro Coliseum; Greensboro, North Carolina
Feb 27, 1999*	No. 17	vs. Western Carolina; Semifinals	W 80–49	27–2	Greensboro Coliseum; Greensboro, North Carolina
Feb 28, 1999*	No. 17	vs. Appalachian State; Championship game	W 77–67	28–2	Greensboro Coliseum; Greensboro, North Carolina
NCAA Tournament
Mar 12, 1999*	(8 E) No. 16	vs. (9 E) Tulsa; First round	L 53–62	28–3	Charlotte Coliseum; Charlotte, North Carolina
*Non-conference game. ^{#}Rankings from AP Poll. (#) Tournament seedings in parentheses. E=East. All times are in Eastern.

== Awards and honors ==
- Sedric Webber – SoCon Player of the Year
- John Kresse – SoCon Coach of the Year
