= VMI Keydets basketball, 1990–1999 =

The VMI Keydets basketball teams represented the Virginia Military Institute in Lexington, Virginia. The program began in 1908, and played their games out of Cameron Hall, as they have since 1981. The Keydets were members of the Southern Conference. Their primary rival is The Citadel.

== 1989–90 ==
1989–1990 VMI Keydets men's basketball
- Conference: Southern Conference
- Record: 14–15 (7–7 SoCon)
- Head coach: Joe Cantafio
- Home arena: Cameron Hall

1989–90 Southern Conference men's basketball standings
	Conf.				Overall
Team	W		L	PCT	W		L	PCT
East Tennessee State †	12	–	2	.857	27	–	7	.794
Marshall	9	–	5	.643	15	–	13	.536
Appalachian State	8	–	6	.571	19	–	11	.633
VMI	7	–	7	.500	14	–	15	.483
Chattanooga	7	–	7	.500	14	–	14	.500
The Citadel	5	–	9	.357	12	–	16	.429
Furman	5	–	9	.357	15	–	16	.484
Western Carolina	3	–	11	.214	10	–	18	.357
† SoCon Tournament winner As of April 30, 1990; Rankings from AP poll

Date time, TV	Opponent	Result	Record	Site city, state
November 27* no, no	Lynchburg	W 87–65	1–0	Cameron Hall; Lexington, VA
November 30* no, no	UNC Asheville	L 77–83	1–1	Cameron Hall; Lexington, VA
December 2* no, no	vs. James Madison	L 61–91	1–2	Roanoke Civic Center; Roanoke, VA
December 4* no, no	at Richmond	L 77–78	1–3	Robins Center; Richmond, VA
December 6* no, no	UNC Greensboro	W 76–50	2–3	Cameron Hall; Lexington, VA
December 21* no, no	at Texas	L 74–98	2–4	Frank Erwin Center; Austin, TX
December 23* no, no	at Arkansas	L 61–92	2–5	Little Rock, AR
December 28* no, no	vs. Brown; Mount St. Mary's Holiday Tournament	W 82–59	3–5	Knott Arena; Emmitsburg, MD
December 29 no, no	at Mount St. Mary's; Mount St. Mary's Holiday Tournament	L 77–86	3–6	Knott Arena; Emmitsburg, MD
January 8 no, no	at Marshall	L 68–72	3–7 (0–1)	Cam Henderson Center; Huntington, WV
January 13 no, no	at Western Carolina	L 66–72	3–8 (0–2)	Ramsey Center; Cullowhee, NC
January 15* no, no	at Virginia	L 78–89	3–9	University Hall; Lexington, VA
January 18* no, no	Radford	W 95–64	4–9	Cameron Hall; Lexington, VA
January 20 no, no	at Furman	L 71–94	4–10 (0–3)	Greenville Memorial Auditorium; Greenville, SC
January 22 no, no	at The Citadel	L 73–89	4–11 (0–4)	McAlister Field House; Charleston, SC
January 24 no, no	Chattanooga	W 75–72	5–11 (1–4)	Cameron Hall; Lexington, VA
January 27 no, no	East Tennessee State	W 78–77	6–11 (2–4)	Cameron Hall; Lexington, VA
January 29 no, no	Appalachian State	W 73–71	7–11 (3–4)	Cameron Hall; Lexington, VA
January 31* no, no	Bluefield	W 95–46	8–11	Cameron Hall; Lexington, VA
February 3 no, no	Marshall	W 82–77 ^{OT}	9–11 (4–4)	Cameron Hall; Lexington, VA
February 5* no, no	at William & Mary	W 86–66	10–11	William & Mary Hall; Williamsburg, VA
February 10 no, no	at Chattanooga	L 63–78	10–12 (4–5)	McKenzie Arena; Chattanooga, TN
February 12 no, no	Western Carolina	W 70–56	11–12 (5–5)	Cameron Hall; Lexington, VA
February 16 no, no	The Citadel	W 77–76	12–12 (6–5)	Cameron Hall; Lexington, VA
February 19 no, no	Furman	W 84–75	13–12 (7–5)	Cameron Hall; Lexington, VA
February 24 no, no	at Appalachian State	L 75–80	13–13 (7–6)	Varsity Gymnasium; Boone, NC
February 26 no, no	at East Tennessee State	L 81–100	13–14 (7–7)	Memorial Center; Johnson City, TN
1990 Southern Conference men's basketball tournament
March 2 no, no	vs. Chattanooga	W 83–69	14–14	Asheville Civic Center; Asheville, NC
March 3 no, no	vs. East Tennessee State	L 94–99	14–15	Asheville Civic Center; Asheville, NC
*Non-conference game. (#) Tournament seedings in parentheses. All times are in Eastern Time.

== 1990–91 ==
1990–91 VMI Keydets men's basketball
- Conference: Southern Conference
- Record: 10–18 (5–9 SoCon)
- Head coach: Joe Cantafio
- Home arena: Cameron Hall

1990–91 Southern Conference men's basketball standings
	Conf.				Overall
Team	W		L	PCT	W		L	PCT
Furman	11	–	3	.786	20	–	9	.690
No. 17 East Tennessee State†	11	–	3	.786	28	–	5	.848
Chattanooga	11	–	3	.786	19	–	10	.655
Appalachian State	7	–	7	.500	16	–	14	.533
Marshall	7	–	7	.500	14	–	14	.500
VMI	5	–	9	.357	10	–	18	.357
Western Carolina	3	–	11	.214	11	–	17	.393
The Citadel	1	–	13	.071	6	–	22	.214
† 1991 SoCon Tournament winner As of April 30, 1991; Rankings from AP poll

Date time, TV	Opponent	Result	Record	Site city, state
November 23* no, no	at Virginia Tech	L 77–79	0–1	Cassell Coliseum; Blacksburg, VA
November 26* no, no	Bluefield	W 91–76	1–1	Cameron Hall; Lexington, VA
November 28* no, no	Bridgewater	W 65–48	2–1	Cameron Hall; Lexington, VA
November 30* no, no	at Liberty	W 69–61	3–1	Vines Center; Lynchburg, VA
December 3* no, no	at Radford	L 61–62	3–2	Dedmon Center; Radford, VA
December 7* no, no	at Cornell; U.S. Air Cornell Classic	L 80–93	3–3	Newman Arena; Ithaca, NY
December 8* no, no	vs. Kent State; U.S. Air Cornell Classic	L 61–65	3–4	Newman Arena; Ithaca, NY
December 18* no, no	at Alabama	L 45–79	3–5	Coleman Coliseum; Tuscaloosa, AL
December 20* no, no	at Vanderbilt	L 60–79	3–6	Memorial Gymnasium; Nashville, TN
January 5 no, no	at Furman	L 67–87	3–7 (0–1)	Greenville Memorial Auditorium; Greenville, SC
January 7 no, no	at The Citadel	W 77–65	4–7 (1–1)	McAlister Field House; Charleston, SC
January 10* no, no	at UNC Asheville	W 74–66	5–7	Justice Center; Asheville, NC
January 12 no, no	Western Carolina	W 85–74	6–7 (2–1)	Cameron Hall; Lexington, VA
January 14 no, no	Chattanooga	L 67–73	6–8 (2–2)	Cameron Hall; Lexington, VA
January 19 no, no	Marshall	L 71–77	6–9 (2–3)	Cameron Hall; Lexington, VA
January 21* no, no	Richmond	W 80–75	7–9	Cameron Hall; Lexington, VA
January 23* no, no	William & Mary	L 46–58	7–10	Cameron Hall; Lexington, VA
January 26 no, no	East Tennessee State	L 66–97	7–11 (2–4)	Cameron Hall; Lexington, VA
January 28 no, no	at Appalachian State	L 72–78	7–12 (2–5)	Varsity Gymnasium; Boone, NC
February 2 no, no	The Citadel	W 85–67	8–12 (3–5)	Cameron Hall; Lexington, VA
February 4 no, no	Furman	W 80–79	9–12 (4–5)	Cameron Hall; Lexington, VA
February 9 no, no	at Chattanooga	L 73–101	9–13 (4–6)	McKenzie Arena; Chattanooga, TN
February 11 no, no	at Western Carolina	L 64–80	9–14 (4–7)	Ramsey Center; Cullowhee, NC
February 16 no, no	at Marshall	W 96–95	10–14 (5–7)	Cam Henderson Center; Huntington, WV
February 21* no, no	at James Madison	L 67–82	10–15	JMU Convocation Center; Harrisonburg, VA
February 23 no, no	Appalachian State	L 70–83	10–16 (5–8)	Cameron Hall; Lexington, VA
February 25 no, no	East Tennessee State	L 76–88	10–17 (5–9)	Cameron Hall; Lexington, VA
1991 Southern Conference men's basketball tournament
March 1 no, no	vs. Appalachian State	L 72–100	10–18	Asheville Civic Center; Asheville, NC
*Non-conference game. (#) Tournament seedings in parentheses. All times are in Eastern Time.

== 1991–92 ==
1991–1992 VMI Keydets men's basketball
- Conference: Southern Conference
- Record: 10–18 (3–11 SoCon)
- Head coach: Joe Cantafio
- Home arena: Cameron Hall

1991–92 Southern Conference men's basketball standings
	Conf.				Overall
Team	W		L	PCT	W		L	PCT
East Tennessee State †	12	–	2	.857	24	–	7	.774
Chattanooga	12	–	2	.857	23	–	7	.767
Furman	9	–	5	.643	17	–	11	.607
Appalachian State	9	–	5	.643	15	–	14	.517
Western Carolina	5	–	9	.357	11	–	17	.393
Marshall	3	–	11	.214	7	–	22	.241
VMI	3	–	11	.214	10	–	18	.357
The Citadel	3	–	11	.214	10	–	18	.357
† 1992 SoCon Tournament winner As of April 30, 1992; Rankings from AP poll

Date time, TV	Opponent	Result	Record	Site city, state
November 25* no, no	Shenandoah	W 100–71	1–0	Cameron Hall; Lexington, VA
November 29* no, no	at Weber State; Weber State Military Classic	L 65–83	1–1	Dee Events Center; Ogden, UT
November 30* no, no	vs. Army; Weber State Military Classic	L 53–59	1–2	Dee Events Center; Ogden, UT
December 4* no, no	Radford	W 76–69	2–2	Cameron Hall; Lexington, VA
December 7* no, no	Liberty	L 55–64	2–3	Cameron Hall; Lexington, VA
December 18* no, no	at Wake Forest	L 43–74	2–4	Joel Coliseum; Winston-Salem, NC
December 30* no, no	at Dayton	L 56–84	2–5	University of Dayton Arena; Dayton, OH
January 8* no, no	at Richmond	L 59–76	2–6	Robins Center; Richmond, VA
January 11 no, no	at Western Carolina	W 79–74	3–6 (1–0)	Ramsey Center; Cullowhee, NC
January 13 no, no	at Chattanooga	L 69–83	3–7 (1–1)	McKenzie Arena; Chattanooga, TN
January 16* no, no	Winthrop	W 67–52	4–7	Cameron Hall; Lexington, VA
January 18 no, no	at Marshall	W 74–69 ^{2OT}	5–7 (2–1)	Cam Henderson Center; Huntington, WV
January 22* no, no	Bluefield	W 105–71	6–7	Cameron Hall; Lexington, VA
January 25 no, no	East Tennessee State	L 68–80	6–8 (2–2)	Cameron Hall; Lexington, VA
January 27 no, no	Appalachian State	L 67–80	6–9 (2–3)	Cameron Hall; Lexington, VA
January 29* no, no	UNC Asheville	W 62–51	7–9	Cameron Hall; Lexington, VA
February 1 no, no	at The Citadel	L 60–66	7–10 (2–4)	McAlister Field House; Charleston, SC
February 3 no, no	at Furman	L 57–74	7–11 (2–5)	Greenville Memorial Auditorium; Greenville, SC
February 8 no, no	Chattanooga	L 75–85	7–12 (2–6)	Cameron Hall; Lexington, VA
February 10 no, no	Western Carolina	L 88–89	7–13 (2–7)	Cameron Hall; Lexington, VA
February 13* no, no	at Winthrop	W 71–63	8–13	Winthrop Coliseum; Rock Hill, SC
February 15 no, no	Marshall	L 72–79	8–14 (2–8)	Cameron Hall; Lexington, VA
February 18* no, no	at William & Mary	W 76–68	9–14	William & Mary Hall; Williamsburg, VA
February 22 no, no	at Appalachian State	L 65–88	9–15 (2–9)	Varsity Gymnasium; Boone, NC
February 24 no, no	at East Tennessee State	L 84–92	9–16 (2–10)	Memorial Center; Johnson City, TN
February 29 no, no	Furman	L 65–72	9–17 (2–11)	Cameron Hall; Lexington, VA
March 2 no, no	The Citadel	W 64–60	10–17 (3–11)	Cameron Hall; Lexington, VA
1992 Southern Conference men's basketball tournament
March 6 no, no	vs. Chattanooga	L 49–84	10–18	Asheville Civic Center; Asheville, NC
*Non-conference game. (#) Tournament seedings in parentheses. All times are in Eastern Time.

== 1992–93 ==
1992–1993 VMI Keydets men's basketball
- Conference: Southern Conference
- Record: 5–22 (3–15 SoCon)
- Head coach: Joe Cantafio
- Home arena: Cameron Hall

1992–93 Southern Conference men's basketball standings
	Conf.				Overall
Team	W		L	PCT	W		L	PCT
Chattanooga †	16	–	2	.889	26	–	7	.788
East Tennessee State	12	–	6	.667	19	–	10	.655
Georgia Southern	12	–	6	.667	19	–	9	.679
Marshall	11	–	7	.611	16	–	11	.593
Davidson	10	–	8	.556	14	–	14	.500
The Citadel	8	–	10	.444	10	–	17	.370
Appalachian State	8	–	10	.444	13	–	15	.464
Furman	8	–	10	.444	11	–	17	.393
VMI	3	–	15	.167	5	–	22	.185
Western Carolina	2	–	16	.111	6	–	21	.222
† 1993 SoCon Tournament winner As of April 30, 1993; Rankings from AP poll

Date time, TV	Opponent	Result	Record	Site city, state
December 1* no, no	Bluefield	W 91–63	1–0	Cameron Hall; Lexington, VA
December 5* no, no	at Richmond	L 65–77	1–1	Robins Center; Richmond, VA
December 7* no, no	at Radford	L 88–91 ^{OT}	1–2	Dedmon Center; Radford, VA
December 11* no, no	vs. Central Connecticut State; Marist Pepsi Classic	L 77–84 ^{OT}	1–3	McCann Field House; Poughkeepsie, NY
December 13* no, no	vs. Lafayette; Marist Pepsi Classic	W 62–56	2–3	McCann Field House; Poughkeepsie, NY
January 2* no, no	at Georgia Tech	L 52–78	2–4	Hank McCamish Pavilion; Atlanta, GA
January 6 no, no	at East Tennessee State	L 54–71	2–5 (0–1)	Memorial Center; Johnson City, TN
January 9 no, no	Western Carolina	W 67–56	3–5 (1–1)	Cameron Hall; Lexington, VA
January 10 no, no	Chattanooga	L 62–71	3–6 (1–2)	Cameron Hall; Lexington, VA
January 13 no, no	at Appalachian State	W 93–86	4–6 (2–2)	Varsity Gymnasium; Boone, NC
January 16 no, no	The Citadel	W 76–74	5–6 (3–2)	Cameron Hall; Lexington, VA
January 17 no, no	Georgia Southern	L 70–73	5–7 (3–3)	Cameron Hall; Lexington, VA
January 23 no, no	at Davidson	L 64–75	5–8 (3–4)	John M. Belk Arena; Davidson, NC
January 24 no, no	at Furman	L 61–73	5–9 (3–5)	Greenville Memorial Auditorium; Greenville, SC
January 27 no, no	at Marshall	L 66–80	5–10 (3–6)	Cam Henderson Center; Huntington, WV
January 30 no, no	Appalachian State	L 55–64	5–11 (3–7)	Cameron Hall; Lexington, VA
January 31 no, no	East Tennessee State	L 70–96	5–12 (3–8)	Cameron Hall; Lexington, VA
February 3* no, no	William & Mary	L 67–77	5–13	Cameron Hall; Lexington, VA
February 6 no, no	Marshall	L 69–78	5–14 (3–9)	Cameron Hall; Lexington, VA
February 10* no, no	at Virginia Tech	L 44–75	5–15	Cassell Coliseum; Blacksburg, VA
February 13 no, no	at Chattanooga	L 70–93	5–16 (3–10)	McKenzie Arena; Chattanooga, TN
February 14 no, no	at Western Carolina	L 51–84	5–17 (3–11)	Ramsey Center; Cullowhee, NC
February 20 no, no	at Georgia Southern	L 63–69	5–18 (3–12)	Hanner Fieldhouse; Statesboro, GA
February 21 no, no	at The Citadel	L 53–69	5–19 (3–13)	McAlister Field House; Charleston, SC
February 27 no, no	Furman	L 69–85	5–20 (3–14)	Cameron Hall; Lexington, VA
February 28 no, no	Davidson	L 70–84	5–21 (3–15)	Cameron Hall; Lexington, VA
1993 Southern Conference men's basketball tournament
March 4 no, no	vs. Furman	L 51–76	5–22	Asheville Civic Center; Asheville, NC
*Non-conference game. (#) Tournament seedings in parentheses. All times are in Eastern Time.

== 1993–94 ==
1993–1994 VMI Keydets men's basketball
- Conference: Southern Conference
- Record: 5–23 (2–16 SoCon)
- Head coach: Joe Cantafio
- Home arena: Cameron Hall

1993–94 Southern Conference men's basketball standings
	Conf.				Overall
Team	W		L	PCT	W		L	PCT
Chattanooga †	14	–	4	.778	23	–	7	.767
Davidson	13	–	5	.722	22	–	8	.733
East Tennessee State	13	–	5	.722	16	–	14	.533
Appalachian State	12	–	6	.667	16	–	11	.593
Georgia Southern	9	–	9	.500	14	–	14	.500
Western Carolina	8	–	10	.444	12	–	16	.429
Marshall	7	–	11	.389	9	–	18	.333
The Citadel	6	–	12	.333	11	–	16	.407
Furman	6	–	12	.333	10	–	18	.357
VMI	2	–	16	.111	5	–	23	.179
† 1994 SoCon Tournament winner As of April 30, 1994; Rankings from AP poll

Date time, TV	Opponent	Result	Record	Site city, state
November 29* no, no	Bluefield	W 97–58	1–0	Cameron Hall; Lexington, VA
December 1* no, no	Richmond	L 55–74	1–1	Cameron Hall; Lexington, VA
December 6* no, no	at Virginia Tech	L 59–82	1–2	Cassell Coliseum; Blacksburg, VA
December 11* no, no	Radford	L 61–79	1–3	Cameron Hall; Lexington, VA
December 22* no, no	at Dayton	L 73–85	1–4	University of Dayton Arena; Dayton, OH
January 5* no, no	at Wake Forest	L 44–72	1–5	Joel Coliseum; Winston-Salem, NC
January 8 no, no	at Western Carolina	L 58–68	1–6 (0–1)	Ramsey Center; Cullowhee, NC
January 10 no, no	at Chattanooga	L 62–82	1–7 (0–2)	McKenzie Arena; Chattanooga, TN
January 12 no, no	Appalachian State	L 70–74	1–8 (0–3)	Cameron Hall; Lexington, VA
January 15 no, no	at The Citadel	L 50–63	1–9 (0–4)	McAlister Field House; Charleston, SC
January 17 no, no	at Georgia Southern	L 61–83	1–10 (0–5)	Hanner Fieldhouse; Statesboro, GA
January 20 no, no	East Tennessee State	L 92–93 ^{OT}	1–11 (0–6)	Cameron Hall; Lexington, VA
January 22 no, no	Davidson	L 60–78	1–12 (0–7)	Cameron Hall; Lexington, VA
January 24 no, no	at Furman	L 55–67	1–13 (0–8)	Greenville Memorial Auditorium; Greenville, SC
January 27 no, no	Marshall	W 82–78	2–13 (1–8)	Cameron Hall; Lexington, VA
January 29 no, no	at Appalachian State	L 64–74	2–14 (1–9)	Varsity Gymnasium; Boone, NC
February 2* no, no	Shenandoah	W 104–77	3–14	Cameron Hall; Lexington, VA
February 5 no, no	at Marshall	L 64–78	3–15 (1–10)	Cam Henderson Center; Huntington, WV
February 9* no, no	at William & Mary	L 68–79	3–16	William & Mary Hall; Williamsburg, VA
February 12 no, no	Chattanooga	L 72–92	3–17 (1–11)	Cameron Hall; Lexington, VA
February 14 no, no	Western Carolina	W 79–76	4–17 (2–11)	Cameron Hall; Lexington, VA
February 16 no, no	at East Tennessee State	L 69–97	4–18 (2–12)	Memorial Center; Johnson City, TN
February 19 no, no	Georgia Southern	L 61–63	4–19 (2–13)	Cameron Hall; Lexington, VA
February 21 no, no	The Citadel	L 57–80	4–20 (2–14)	Cameron Hall; Lexington, VA
February 26 no, no	Furman	L 64–67	4–21 (2–15)	Cameron Hall; Lexington, VA
February 28 no, no	at Davidson	L 65–79	4–22 (2–16)	John M. Belk Arena; Davidson, NC
1994 Southern Conference men's basketball tournament
March 3 no, no	vs. Marshall	W 84–62	5–22	Asheville Civic Center; Asheville, NC
March 4 no, no	vs. Davidson	L 61–71	5–23	Asheville Civic Center; Asheville, NC
*Non-conference game. (#) Tournament seedings in parentheses. All times are in Eastern Time.

== 1994–95 ==
1994–1995 VMI Keydets men's basketball
- Conference: Southern Conference
- North Division
- Record: 10–17 (6–8 SoCon)
- Head coach: Bart Bellairs
- Home arena: Cameron Hall

1994–95 Southern Conference men's basketball standings
	Conf.				Overall
Team	W		L	PCT	W		L	PCT
North
Marshall	10	–	4	.714	18	–	9	.667
East Tennessee State	9	–	5	.643	14	–	14	.500
Davidson	7	–	7	.500	14	–	13	.519
VMI	6	–	8	.429	10	–	17	.370
Appalachian State	4	–	10	.286	9	–	20	.310
South
Chattanooga †	11	–	3	.786	19	–	11	.633
Western Carolina	8	–	6	.571	14	–	14	.500
The Citadel	6	–	8	.429	11	–	16	.407
Furman	6	–	8	.429	10	–	17	.370
Georgia Southern	3	–	11	.214	8	–	20	.286
† SoCon Tournament winner As of April 30, 1995; Rankings from AP poll

Date time, TV	Opponent	Result	Record	Site city, state
November 28* no, no	Centenary (NJ)	W 93–76	1–0	Cameron Hall; Lexington, VA
November 29* no, no	Bluefield	W 96–72	2–0	Cameron Hall; Lexington, VA
December 3* no, no	Richmond	L 85–105	2–1	Cameron Hall; Lexington, VA
December 7* no, no	at Virginia Tech	L 75–110	2–2	Cassell Coliseum; Blacksburg, VA
December 10* no, no	at Radford	L 93–99	2–3	Dedmon Center; Radford, VA
December 17* no, no	at #1 North Carolina	L 89–129	2–4	Dean Smith Center; Chapel Hill, NC
December 19* no, no	at Virginia	L 73–100	2–5	University Hall; Charlottesville, VA
January 7* no, no	at Alabama	L 67–93	2–6	Coleman Coliseum; Tuscaloosa, AL
January 9* no, no	at Navy	L 83–101	2–7	Alumni Hall; Annapolis, MD
January 14 no, no	at Western Carolina	L 77–90 ^{OT}	2–8 (0–1)	Ramsey Center; Cullowhee, NC
January 16 no, no	Marshall	L 87–112	2–9 (0–2)	Cameron Hall; Lexington, VA
January 21 no, no	at Davidson	L 75–83	2–10 (0–3)	John M. Belk Arena; Davidson, NC
January 23 no, no	East Tennessee State	L 69–89	2–11 (0–4)	Cameron Hall; Lexington, VA
January 26* no, no	William & Mary	L 86–95	2–12	Cameron Hall; Lexington, VA
January 28 no, no	at Appalachian State	W 89–85	3–12 (1–4)	Varsity Gymnasium; Boone, NC
January 30 no, no	Chattanooga	W 72–63	4–12 (2–4)	Cameron Hall; Lexington, VA
February 4 no, no	Georgia Southern	W 84–79	5–12 (3–4)	Cameron Hall; Lexington, VA
February 6 no, no	at The Citadel	L 69–84	5–13 (3–5)	McAlister Field House; Charleston, SC
February 11 no, no	at East Tennessee State	W 80–78	6–13 (4–5)	Memorial Center; Johnson City, TN
February 13 no, no	at Furman	L 59–60	6–14 (4–6)	Greenville Memorial Auditorium; Greenville, SC
February 15* no, no	Lynchburg	W 84–66	7–14	Cameron Hall; Lexington, VA
February 18 no, no	at Marshall	L 62–107	7–15 (4–7)	Cam Henderson Center; Huntington, WV
February 20 no, no	Davidson	W 81–75	8–15 (5–7)	Cameron Hall; Lexington, VA
February 22* no, no	Army	W 91–67	9–15	Cameron Hall; Lexington, VA
February 25 no, no	Appalachian State	L 89–92	9–16 (5–8)	Cameron Hall; Lexington, VA
February 27 no, no	The Citadel	W 75–66	10–16 (6–8)	Cameron Hall; Lexington, VA
1995 Southern Conference men's basketball tournament
March 2 no, no	vs. Georgia Southern	L 71–94	10–17	Asheville Civic Center; Asheville, NC
*Non-conference game. (#) Tournament seedings in parentheses. All times are in Eastern Time.

== 1995–96 ==
1995–1996 VMI Keydets men's basketball
- Conference: Southern Conference
- North Division
- Record: 18–10 (10–4 SoCon)
- Head coach: Bart Bellairs
- Home arena: Cameron Hall

1995–96 Southern Conference men's basketball standings
	Conf.				Overall
Team	W		L	PCT	W		L	PCT
North
Davidson	14	–	0	1.000	25	–	5	.833
VMI	10	–	4	.714	18	–	10	.643
Marshall	8	–	6	.571	17	–	11	.607
East Tennessee State	3	–	11	.214	7	–	20	.259
Appalachian State	3	–	11	.214	8	–	21	.276
South
Western Carolina †	10	–	4	.714	17	–	13	.567
Chattanooga	9	–	5	.643	15	–	12	.556
Furman	6	–	8	.429	10	–	17	.370
The Citadel	5	–	9	.357	10	–	16	.385
Georgia Southern	2	–	12	.143	3	–	23	.115
† SoCon Tournament winner As of April 30, 1996; Rankings from AP poll

Date time, TV	Opponent	Result	Record	Site city, state
November 25* no, no	at NC State	L 78–104	0–1	Reynolds Coliseum; Raleigh, NC
November 28* no, no	Washington and Lee	W 100–62	1–1	Cameron Hall; Lexington, VA
November 30* no, no	at Penn State	L 73–99	1–2	Rec Hall; University Park, PA
December 2* no, no	Radford	W 110–103	2–2	Cameron Hall; Lexington, VA
December 4* no, no	Lynchburg	W 107–74	3–2	Cameron Hall; Lexington, VA
December 9* no, no	at Virginia Tech	L 67–99	3–3	Cassell Coliseum; Blacksburg, VA
December 21* no, no	Eastern Mennonite	W 91–62	4–3	Cameron Hall; Lexington, VA
January 3* no, no	Winthrop	W 101–78	5–3	Cameron Hall; Lexington, VA
January 6* no, no	at Richmond	W 77–65	6–3	Robins Center; Richmond, VA
January 15 no, no	at Marshall	L 71–78	6–4 (0–1)	Cam Henderson Center; Huntington, WV
January 17* no, no	at William & Mary	L 49–90	6–5	William & Mary Hall; Williamsburg, VA
January 22 no, no	at East Tennessee State	W 96–86	7–5 (1–1)	Memorial Center; Johnson City, TN
January 27 no, no	Appalachian State	W 84–64	8–5 (2–1)	Cameron Hall; Lexington, VA
January 29 no, no	at Chattanooga	L 69–71	8–6 (2–2)	McKenzie Arena; Chattanooga, TN
January 31 no, no	at Davidson	L 79–86	8–7 (2–3)	John M. Belk Arena; Davidson, NC
February 3* no, no	Wofford	W 80–66	9–7	Cameron Hall; Lexington, VA
February 5 no, no	The Citadel	W 91–52	10–7 (3–3)	Cameron Hall; Lexington, VA
February 7 no, no	at Georgia Southern	W 71–48	11–7 (4–3)	Hanner Fieldhouse; Statesboro, GA
February 10 no, no	East Tennessee State	W 82–79	12–7 (5–3)	Cameron Hall; Lexington, VA
February 12 no, no	Furman	W 83–57	13–7 (6–3)	Cameron Hall; Lexington, VA
February 14 no, no	Western Carolina	W 90–73	14–7 (7–3)	Cameron Hall; Lexington, VA
February 17 no, no	Marshall	W 103–94	15–7 (8–3)	Cameron Hall; Lexington, VA
February 19 no, no	Davidson	L 76–95	15–8 (8–4)	Cameron Hall; Lexington, VA
February 22* no, no	#17 North Carolina	L 76–99	15–9	Cameron Hall; Lexington, VA
February 24 no, no	at Appalachian State	W 85–75	16–9 (9–4)	Varsity Gymnasium; Boone, NC
February 26 no, no	at The Citadel	W 85–83	17–9 (10–4)	McAlister Field House; Charleston, SC
1996 Southern Conference men's basketball tournament
March 1 no, no	vs. Furman	W 91–89 ^{OT}	18–9	Greensboro Coliseum; Greensboro, NC
March 2 no, no	vs. Western Carolina	L 93–97 ^{OT}	18–10	Greensboro Coliseum; Greensboro, NC
*Non-conference game. (#) Tournament seedings in parentheses. All times are in Eastern Time.

== 1996–97 ==
1996–1997 VMI Keydets men's basketball
- Conference: Southern Conference
- North Division
- Record: 12–16 (7–7 SoCon)
- Head coach: Bart Bellairs
- Home arena: Cameron Hall

1996–97 Southern Conference men's basketball standings
	Conf.				Overall
Team	W		L	PCT	W		L	PCT
North
Marshall	10	–	4	.714	20	–	9	.690
Davidson	10	–	4	.714	18	–	10	.643
Appalachian State	8	–	6	.571	14	–	14	.500
VMI	7	–	7	.500	12	–	16	.429
East Tennessee State	2	–	12	.143	7	–	20	.259
South
Chattanooga†	11	–	3	.786	24	–	11	.686
Western Carolina	7	–	7	.500	14	–	13	.519
The Citadel	6	–	8	.429	13	–	14	.481
Georgia Southern	5	–	9	.357	10	–	18	.357
Furman	4	–	10	.286	10	–	17	.370
† SoCon Tournament winner As of April 30, 1997; Rankings from AP poll

Date time, TV	Opponent	Result	Record	Site city, state
November 22* no, no	Albright	W 111–53	1–0	Cameron Hall; Lexington, VA
November 24* no, no	at #3 Wake Forest	L 63–92	1–1	Joel Coliseum; Winston-Salem, NC
December 5* no, no	at Navy	L 62–68	1–2	Alumni Hall; Annapolis, MD
December 7* no, no	Washington and Lee	W 112–67	2–2	Cameron Hall; Lexington, VA
December 10* no, no	at Radford	L 68–70	2–3	Dedmon Center; Radford, VA
December 15* no, no	#11 North Carolina	L 61–105	2–4	Cameron Hall; Lexington, VA
December 18* no, no	Eastern Mennonite	W 107–61	3–4	Cameron Hall; Lexington, VA
December 21* no, no	at Winthrop	W 96–78	4–4	Winthrop Coliseum; Rock Hill, SC
December 30* no, no	at Florida International	L 63–91	4–5	U.S. Century Bank Arena; Miami, FL
January 4* no, no	at Charlotte	L 76–96	4–6	Dale F. Halton Arena; Charlotte, NC
January 6 no, no	at Appalachian State	L 72–77	4–7 (0–1)	Varsity Gymnasium; Boone, NC
January 8* no, no	at Richmond	L 77–83	4–8	Robins Center; Richmond, VA
January 11 no, no	Chattanooga	L 76–91	4–9 (0–2)	Cameron Hall; Lexington, VA
January 13 no, no	Georgia Southern	W 75–61	5–9 (1–2)	Cameron Hall; Lexington, VA
January 16* no, no	at Wofford	L 65–86	5–10	Benjamin Johnson Arena; Spartanburg, SC
January 18 no, no	at The Citadel	W 86–76	6–10 (2–2)	McAlister Field House; Charleston, SC
January 20 no, no	at East Tennessee State	W 57–54	7–10 (3–2)	Memorial Center; Johnson City, TN
January 25 no, no	at Furman	W 62–60	8–10 (4–2)	Herman W. Lay Physical Activities Center; Greenville, SC
January 27 no, no	Marshall	W 87–82	9–10 (5–2)	Cameron Hall; Lexington, VA
February 1 no, no	at Davidson	L 67–77	9–11 (5–3)	John M. Belk Arena; Davidson, NC
February 3 no, no	Appalachian State	W 78–65	10–11 (6–3)	Cameron Hall; Lexington, VA
February 8 no, no	The Citadel	L 74–81	10–12 (6–4)	Cameron Hall; Lexington, VA
February 10 no, no	at Western Carolina	L 65–84	10–13 (6–5)	Ramsey Center; Cullowhee, NC
February 15 no, no	at Marshall	L 77–79	10–14 (6–6)	Cam Henderson Center; Huntington, WV
February 17 no, no	Davidson	L 77–97	10–15 (6–7)	Cameron Hall; Lexington, VA
February 23 no, no	East Tennessee State	W 97–75	11–15 (7–7)	Cameron Hall; Lexington, VA
1997 Southern Conference men's basketball tournament
February 27 no, no	vs. Furman	W 87–84 ^{OT}	12–15	Greensboro Coliseum; Greensboro, NC
February 28 no, no	vs. Chattanooga	L 62–84	12–16	Greensboro Coliseum; Greensboro, NC
*Non-conference game. (#) Tournament seedings in parentheses. All times are in Eastern Time.

== 1997–98 ==
1997–1998 VMI Keydets men's basketball
- Conference: Southern Conference
- North Division
- Record: 14–13 (8–7 SoCon)
- Head coach: Bart Bellairs
- Home arena: Cameron Hall

1997–98 Southern Conference men's basketball standings
	Conf.				Overall
Team	W		L	PCT	W		L	PCT
North
Davidson †	13	–	2	.867	20	–	10	.667
Appalachian State	13	–	2	.867	21	–	8	.724
VMI	8	–	7	.533	14	–	13	.519
Western Carolina	6	–	9	.400	12	–	15	.444
East Tennessee State	6	–	9	.400	11	–	16	.407
UNC Greensboro	6	–	9	.400	9	–	19	.321
South
Chattanooga	7	–	7	.500	13	–	15	.464
Wofford	6	–	8	.429	9	–	18	.333
The Citadel	6	–	8	.429	15	–	13	.536
Georgia Southern	5	–	9	.357	9	–	20	.310
Furman	4	–	10	.286	10	–	18	.357
† 1998 SoCon Tournament winner As of April 30, 1998; Rankings from AP poll

Date time, TV	Opponent	Result	Record	Site city, state
November 15* no, no	at Wake Forest	L 70–88	0–1	Joel Coliseum; Winston-Salem, NC
November 18* no, no	Elon	W 85–69	1–1	Cameron Hall; Lexington, VA
November 25* no, no	at Old Dominion	L 69–94	1–2	ODU Fieldhouse; Norfolk, VA
December 2* no, no	West Virginia Tech	W 95–54	2–2	Cameron Hall; Lexington, VA
December 6* no, no	Charlotte	L 70–88	2–3	Cameron Hall; Lexington, VA
December 14* no, no	Penn State	W 71–68	3–3	Cameron Hall; Lexington, VA
December 20* no, no	Lynchburg	W 113–59	4–3	Cameron Hall; Lexington, VA
December 22* no, no	at Virginia	L 55–92	4–4	University Hall; Charlottesville, VA
December 31* no, no	at Virginia Tech	W 73–65	5–4	Cassell Coliseum; Blacksburg, VA
January 3 no, no	at Georgia Southern	W 76–73 ^{2OT}	6–4 (1–0)	Hanner Fieldhouse; Statesboro, GA
January 6 no, no	UNC Greensboro	W 68–65	7–4 (2–0)	Cameron Hall; Lexington, VA
January 10 no, no	Appalachian State	L 71–76	7–5 (2–1)	Cameron Hall; Lexington, VA
January 12 no, no	at Davidson	W 61–58	8–5 (3–1)	John M. Belk Arena; Davidson, NC
January 14* no, no	Shenandoah	W 97–64	9–5	Cameron Hall; Lexington, VA
January 17 no, no	at Western Carolina	W 80–78	10–5 (4–1)	Ramsey Center; Cullowhee, NC
January 19 no, no	The Citadel	L 62–67	10–6 (4–2)	Cameron Hall; Lexington, VA
January 24 no, no	at Chattanooga	L 66–79	10–7 (4–3)	McKenzie Arena; Chattanooga, TN
January 26 no, no	at UNC Greensboro	L 60–72	10–8 (4–4)	Greensboro Coliseum; Greensboro, NC
January 31 no, no	Western Carolina	W 94–80	11–8 (5–4)	Cameron Hall; Lexington, VA
February 2 no, no	at Wofford	W 92–80	12–8 (6–4)	Benjamin Johnson Arena; Spartanburg, SC
February 7* no, no	at Army	L 76–78	12–9	Christl Arena; West Point, NY
February 10 no, no	Furman	W 87–81 ^{OT}	13–9 (7–4)	Cameron Hall; Lexington, VA
February 14 no, no	at Appalachian State	L 74–94	13–10 (7–5)	Varsity Gymnasium; Boone, NC
February 16 no, no	Davidson	L 66–90	13–11 (7–6)	Cameron Hall; Lexington, VA
February 19 no, no	at East Tennessee State	L 66–78	13–12 (7–7)	Memorial Center; Johnson City, TN
February 21 no, no	East Tennessee State	W 74–65	14–12 (8–7)	Cameron Hall; Lexington, VA
1998 Southern Conference men's basketball tournament
February 27 no, no	vs. The Citadel	L 66–77	14–13	Greensboro Coliseum; Greensboro, NC
*Non-conference game. (#) Tournament seedings in parentheses. All times are in Eastern Time.

== 1998–99 ==
1998–1999 VMI Keydets men's basketball
- Conference: Southern Conference
- North Division
- Record: 12–15 (9–7 SoCon)
- Head coach: Bart Bellairs
- Home arena: Cameron Hall

1998–99 Southern Conference men's basketball standings
	Conf.				Overall
Team	W		L	PCT	W		L	PCT
North
Appalachian State	13	–	3	.813	21	–	8	.724
Davidson	11	–	5	.688	16	–	11	.593
East Tennessee State	9	–	7	.563	17	–	11	.607
VMI	9	–	7	.563	12	–	15	.444
UNC Greensboro	5	–	11	.313	7	–	20	.259
Western Carolina	2	–	14	.125	8	–	21	.276
South
No. 16 College of Charleston †	16	–	0	1.000	28	–	3	.903
Chattanooga	9	–	7	.563	16	–	12	.571
Wofford	8	–	8	.500	11	–	16	.407
Georgia Southern	6	–	10	.375	11	–	17	.393
Furman	5	–	11	.313	12	–	16	.429
The Citadel	3	–	13	.188	9	–	18	.333
† 1999 SoCon Tournament winner As of April 30, 1999; Rankings from AP poll

Date time, TV	Opponent	Result	Record	Site city, state
November 14* no, no	Elon	L 84–85	0–1	Cameron Hall; Lexington, VA
November 16* no, no	at Penn State	L 66–90	0–2	Bryce Jordan Center; University Park, PA
November 24* no, no	at Old Dominion	L 69–103	0–3	ODU Fieldhouse; Norfolk, VA
November 30* no, no	Wake Forest	L 61–75	0–4	Cameron Hall; Lexington, VA
December 2* no, no	at Elon	L 69–70	0–5	Alumni Gym; Elon, NC
December 5* no, no	Randolph–Macon	W 81–55	1–5	Cameron Hall; Lexington, VA
December 7 no, no	at UNC Greensboro	W 86–84	2–5 (1–0)	Greensboro Coliseum; Greensboro, NC
December 10* no, no	at Charlotte	L 57–92	2–6	Dale F. Halton Arena; Charlotte, NC
December 18* no, no	Shenandoah	W 90–53	3–6	Cameron Hall; Lexington, VA
December 22* no, no	at Virginia	L 64–82	3–7	University Hall; Charlottesville, VA
January 2 no, no	at East Tennessee State	W 58–55	4–7 (2–0)	Memorial Center; Johnson City, TN
January 4 no, no	Davidson	L 64–85	4–8 (2–1)	Cameron Hall; Lexington, VA
January 9 no, no	at Appalachian State	L 64–100	4–9 (2–2)	Varsity Gymnasium; Boone, NC
January 11 no, no	at Western Carolina	W 91–72	5–9 (3–2)	Ramsey Center; Cullowhee, NC
January 16 no, no	Georgia Southern	W 65–59	6–9 (4–2)	Cameron Hall; Lexington, VA
January 18 no, no	Wofford	W 58–56	7–9 (5–2)	Cameron Hall; Lexington, VA
January 23 no, no	Western Carolina	W 85–73	8–9 (6–2)	Cameron Hall; Lexington, VA
January 25 no, no	at Davidson	L 66–76	8–10 (6–3)	John M. Belk Arena; Davidson, NC
January 27* no, no	Southern Virginia	W 85–67	9–10	Cameron Hall; Lexington, VA
January 30 no, no	at Furman	L 51–84	9–11 (6–4)	Timmons Arena; Greenville, SC
February 1 no, no	at The Citadel	W 74–72 ^{OT}	10–11 (7–4)	McAlister Field House; Charleston, SC
February 6 no, no	East Tennessee State	L 81–83	10–12 (7–5)	Cameron Hall; Lexington, VA
February 8 no, no	at College of Charleston	L 59–85	10–13 (7–6)	John Kresse Arena; Charleston, SC
February 13 no, no	Appalachian State	L 65–83	10–14 (7–7)	Cameron Hall; Lexington, VA
February 15 no, no	UNC Greensboro	W 82–67	11–14 (8–7)	Cameron Hall; Lexington, VA
February 20 no, no	Chattanooga	W 73–57	12–14 (9–7)	Cameron Hall; Lexington, VA
1999 Southern Conference men's basketball tournament
February 25 no, no	vs. Furman	L 49–57	12–15	Greensboro Coliseum; Greensboro, NC
*Non-conference game. (#) Tournament seedings in parentheses. All times are in Eastern Time.
