= 1995–96 Western Carolina Catamounts men's basketball team =

American college basketball season

1995–96 Western Carolina Catamounts men's basketball
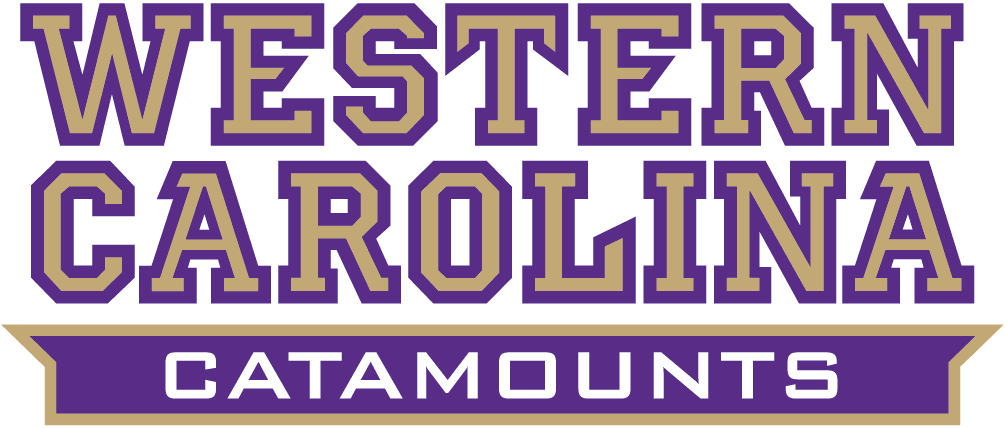

SoCon South division champions SoCon tournament champions

NCAA tournament, First round
- Conference: Southern Conference
- South
- Record: 17–13 (10–4 SoCon)
- Head coach: Phil Hopkins (1st season)
- Assistant coach: Thad Matta (1st season)
- Home arena: Ramsey Center

1995–96 Southern Conference men's basketball standings
	Conf.				Overall
Team	W		L	PCT	W		L	PCT
North
Davidson	14	–	0	1.000	25	–	5	.833
VMI	10	–	4	.714	18	–	10	.643
Marshall	8	–	6	.571	17	–	11	.607
East Tennessee State	3	–	11	.214	7	–	20	.259
Appalachian State	3	–	11	.214	8	–	21	.276
South
Western Carolina †	10	–	4	.714	17	–	13	.567
Chattanooga	9	–	5	.643	15	–	12	.556
Furman	6	–	8	.429	10	–	17	.370
The Citadel	5	–	9	.357	10	–	16	.385
Georgia Southern	2	–	12	.143	3	–	23	.115
† SoCon Tournament winner As of April 30, 1996; Rankings from AP poll

The 1995–96 Western Carolina Catamounts men's basketball team represented Western Carolina University during the 1995–96 NCAA Division I men's basketball season. The Catamounts, led by first-year head coach Phil Hopkins, played their home games at the Ramsey Center and were members of the Southern Conference. They finished the season 17–13, 10–4 in SoCon play to finish in a tie for first place. They defeated Appalachian State, VMI, and Davidson to capture the SoCon tournament title to receive the conference's automatic bid to the NCAA tournament – the first, and only, appearance in program history. Playing as No. 16 seed in the West region, Western Carolina was narrowly beaten by No. 1 seed Purdue, 73–71, in the opening round.

== Roster ==
1995–96 Western Carolina Catamounts men's basketball team
Players	Coaches
Pos. / # / Name / Height / Weight / Year / Hometown; G / 24 / Anquell McCollum / 6 ft 1 in (1.85 m) / — / Sr / Fayetteville, NC	Head coach: Phil Hopkins; Assistant coach(es) Legend: (C) Team captain; (S) Suspended; (I) Ineligible; (W) Walk-on; Injured; Current redshirt

== Schedule and results ==
Date time, TV	Rank^{#}	Opponent^{#}	Result	Record	Site (attendance) city, state
Non-conference Regular season
Nov 29, 1995*		at Georgia	L 71–91	0–3	Stegeman Coliseum; Athens, Georgia
Dec 6, 1995*		at Tennessee	L 51–63	0–5	Thompson-Boling Arena; Knoxville, Tennessee
Dec 20, 1995*		at No. 20 Duke	L 67–107	1–6	Cameron Indoor Stadium; Durham, North Carolina
Jan 2, 1996*		at NC State	L 71–102	1–7	Reynolds Coliseum; Raleigh, North Carolina
Jan 13, 1996*		at Georgia Tech	L 78–91	3–8	Alexander Memorial Coliseum; Atlanta, Georgia
SoCon Regular season
Jan 15, 1996		at Chattanooga	L 70–84	3–9 (0–1)	UTC Arena; Chattanooga, Tennessee
Feb 26, 1996		Appalachian State	W 91–72	14–12 (10–4)	Ramsey Center; Cullowhee, North Carolina
SoCon tournament
Mar 1, 1996*		vs. Appalachian State; Quarterfinals	W 74–66	15–12	Greensboro Coliseum; Greensboro, North Carolina
Mar 2, 1996*		vs. VMI; Semifinals	W 97–93	16–12	Greensboro Coliseum; Greensboro, North Carolina
Mar 3, 1996*		vs. Davidson; Championship game	W 69–60	17–12	Greensboro Coliseum; Greensboro, North Carolina
NCAA tournament
Mar 14, 1996*	(16 W)	vs. (1 W) No. 4 Purdue; First round	L 71–73	17–13	University Arena; Albuquerque, New Mexico
*Non-conference game. ^{#}Rankings from AP Poll. (#) Tournament seedings in parentheses. W=West. All times are in Eastern Time.
