= 1996 Southern Conference men's basketball tournament =

- Classification: Division I
- Season: 1995–96
- Teams: 9
- Site: Greensboro Coliseum; Greensboro, NC
- Champions: Western Carolina (1st title)
- Winning coach: Phil Hopkins (1st title)

1995–96 Southern Conference men's basketball standings
	Conf.				Overall
Team	W		L	PCT	W		L	PCT
North
Davidson	14	–	0	1.000	25	–	5	.833
VMI	10	–	4	.714	18	–	10	.643
Marshall	8	–	6	.571	17	–	11	.607
East Tennessee State	3	–	11	.214	7	–	20	.259
Appalachian State	3	–	11	.214	8	–	21	.276
South
Western Carolina †	10	–	4	.714	17	–	13	.567
Chattanooga	9	–	5	.643	15	–	12	.556
Furman	6	–	8	.429	10	–	17	.370
The Citadel	5	–	9	.357	10	–	16	.385
Georgia Southern	2	–	12	.143	3	–	23	.115
† SoCon Tournament winner As of April 30, 1996; Rankings from AP poll

The 1996 Southern Conference men's basketball tournament took place from February 29–March 3, 1996, at the Greensboro Coliseum in Greensboro, North Carolina. The Western Carolina Catamounts, led by head coach Phil Hopkins, won their first Southern Conference title and received the automatic berth to the 1996 NCAA tournament.

== Format ==
The top nine finishers of the conference's ten members were eligible for the tournament. Teams were seeded based on conference winning percentage. The tournament used a preset bracket consisting of four rounds, the first of which featured one game, with the winners moving on to the quarterfinal round.

== Bracket ==
First round February 29
4S	The Citadel	73
5N	Appalachian State	75

Quarterfinals; March 1
1S	Western Carolina	74
5N	Appalachian State	66
2N	VMI	91*
3S	Furman	89
2S	Chattanooga	81
3N	Marshall	82
1N	Davidson	67
4N	East Tennessee St.	43

Semifinals; March 2
1S	Western Carolina	97
2N	VMI	93
1N	Davidson	92
3N	Marshall	77

Finals; March 3
1S	Western Carolina	69
1N	Davidson	60

* Overtime game

== See also ==
- List of Southern Conference men's basketball champions
