= Mack McCarthy =

American basketball coach (born 1952)

Biographical details
- Born: July 3, 1952 (age 74); Woodstock, Virginia, U.S.
- Education: Virginia Tech

Coaching career (HC unless noted)
- 1974–1976: Virginia Tech (assistant)
- 1976–1978: East Tennessee State (assistant)
- 1978–1985: Auburn (assistant)
- 1985–1997: Chattanooga
- 1997–1998: VCU (associate HC)
- 1998–2002: VCU
- 2005–2007: East Carolina (assistant)
- 2007–2010: East Carolina

Head coaching record
- Overall: 343–234
- Tournaments: 2–5 (NCAA Division I); 0–2 (NIT)

Accomplishments and honors

Championships
- 5 SoCon tournament (1988, 1993–1995, 1997); 8 SoCon regular season (1986, 1989, 1991–1995, 1997)

Awards
- 3x SoCon Coach of the Year (1986, 1992, 1993)

William Leroy "Mack" McCarthy (born July 3, 1952) is the former head college basketball coach for East Carolina University. On March 6, 2010, athletic director Terry Holland announced that McCarthy would complete the season as head coach and then move to a fundraising role with East Carolina University. He served as head coach at the University of Tennessee at Chattanooga from 1985 to 1997, leading the Mocs to the 1997 Sweet Sixteen in the NCAA tournament. Over his 12-year tenure, he took the Mocs to seven postseason appearances (five to the NCAA Tournament), won/shared eight Southern Conference regular season titles and won the SoCon Tournament title five times. His overall record at UTC was 243–122.

McCarthy was also the head coach of the VCU Rams from 1998 to 2002, with a 4-year record of 66–55. Prior to becoming a head coach, he spent two years as an assistant at his alma mater, Virginia Tech, and nine seasons assisting head coach Sonny Smith (two at East Tennessee State and seven at Auburn).

In 19 seasons as a college basketball head coach, McCarthy has a 59.4% winning percentage with a record of 343–234.

In 2014, McCarthy became a college basketball analyst for the American Sports Network, calling CAA and C-USA games, additionally, he also has called games on ESPN3 and the ACC Network Extra for Virginia Tech with Andrew Allegretta, Bailey Angle, Bryant Johnson, and Evan Hughes.

== Head coaching record ==
Record table
Season	Team	Overall	Conference	Standing	Postseason
Chattanooga Mocs (Southern Conference) (1985–1997)
1985–86	Chattanooga	21–10	12–4	1st	NIT First Round
1986–87	Chattanooga	21–8	14–2	2nd	NIT First Round
1987–88	Chattanooga	20–13	8–8	T–5th	NCAA Division I First Round
1988–89	Chattanooga	18–12	10–4	1st	
1989–90	Chattanooga	14–14	7–7	T–4th	
1990–91	Chattanooga	19–10	11–3	T–1st	
1991–92	Chattanooga	23–7	12–2	T–1st	
1992–93	Chattanooga	26–7	16–2	1st	NCAA Division I First Round
1993–94	Chattanooga	23–7	14–4	1st	NCAA Division I First Round
1994–95	Chattanooga	19–11	11–3	1st	NCAA Division I First Round
1995–96	Chattanooga	15–12	9–5	2nd	
1996–97	Chattanooga	24–11	11–3	1st	NCAA Division I Sweet 16
Chattanooga:		243–122 (.666)	135–47 (.742)		
VCU Rams (Colonial Athletic Association) (1998–2002)
1998–99	VCU	15–16	8–8	6th	
1999–00	VCU	14–14	7–9	5th	
2000–01	VCU	16–14	9–7	4th	
2001–02	VCU	21–11	11–7	3rd	
VCU:		66–55 (.545)	35–31 (.530)		
East Carolina Pirates (Conference USA) (2007–2010)
2007–08	East Carolina	11–19	5–11	10th	
2008–09	East Carolina	13–17	5–11	9th	
2009–10	East Carolina	10–21	4–12	10th	
East Carolina:		34–57 (.374)	14–34 (.292)		
Total:		343–234 (.594)			
National champion Postseason invitational champion Conference regular season champion Conference regular season and conference tournament champion Division regular season champion Division regular season and conference tournament champion Conference tournament champion
