= Tim Craft =

American basketball coach (born 1977)

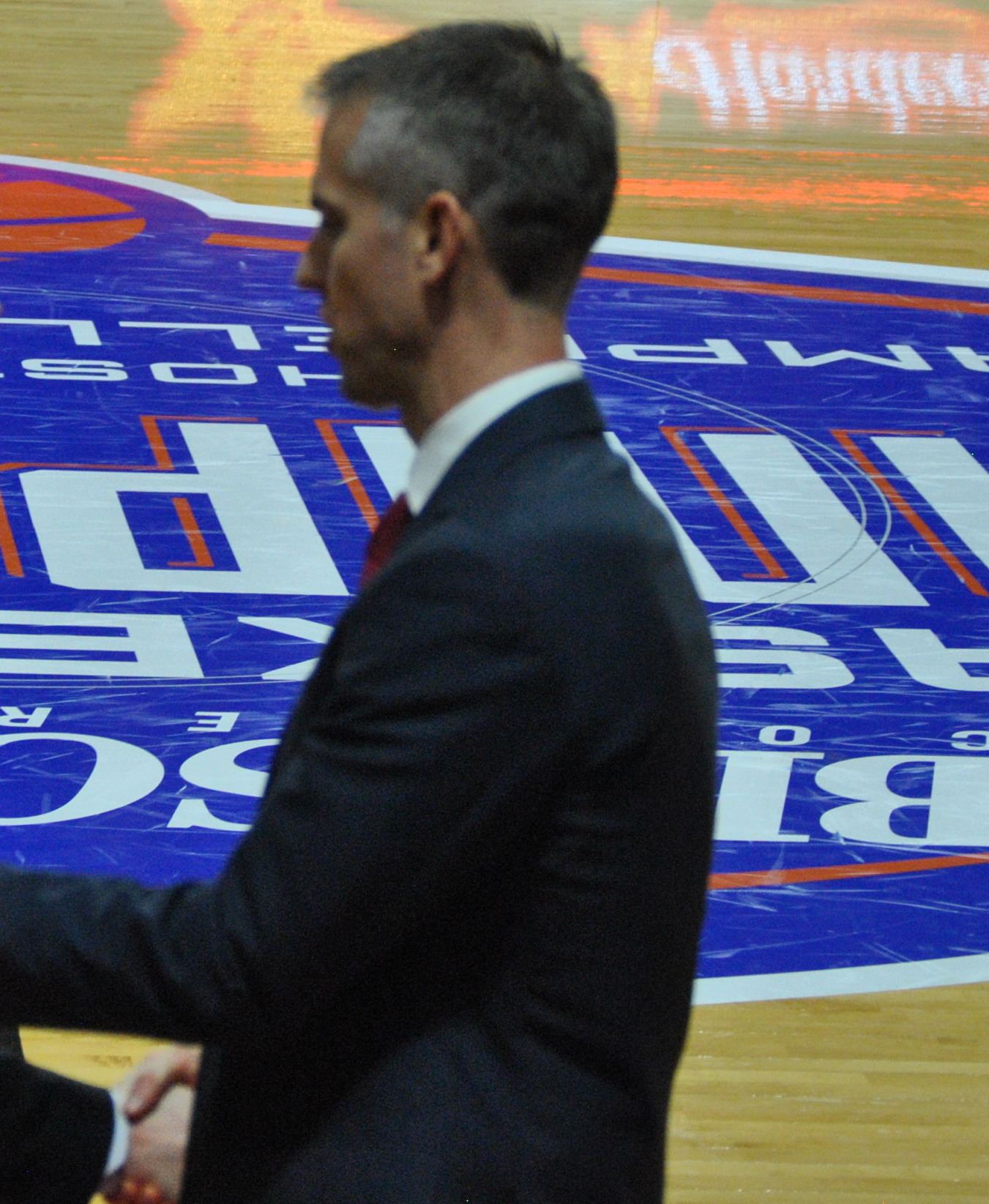

Current position
- Title: Head coach
- Team: Western Carolina
- Conference: SoCon
- Record: 23–38 (.377)

Biographical details
- Born: February 3, 1977 (age 49); Tallahassee, Florida, U.S.
- Education: Florida, B.A. (2000)

Coaching career (HC unless noted)
- 2000–2001: Robert F. Munroe School (assistant)
- 2001–2002: Robert F. Munroe School
- 2002–2004: Pensacola JC (assistant)
- 2004–2007: Gardner–Webb (assistant)
- 2008–2010: Auburn (assistant)
- 2010–2013: East Carolina (assistant)
- 2013–2024: Gardner–Webb
- 2024–present: Western Carolina

Administrative career (AD unless noted)
- 2007–2008: Auburn (dir. basketball operations)

Head coaching record
- Overall: 211–204 (.508)
- Tournaments: 0–1 (NCAA); 0–1 (CBI)

Accomplishments and honors

Championships
- Big South tournament (2019)

Tim Craft (born February 3, 1977) is an American basketball coach. He is head men's basketball coach at Western Carolina University. He was formerly an assistant coach for East Carolina University and Auburn University, and also a head coach at Gardner-Webb University before becoming the head coach of Western Carolina University in 2024.

== Head coaching record ==
Record table
Season	Team	Overall	Conference	Standing	Postseason
Gardner–Webb Runnin' Bulldogs (Big South Conference) (2013–2024)
2013–14	Gardner–Webb	18–15	10–6	T-4th	
2014–15	Gardner–Webb	20–15	10–8	T–6th	CBI first round
2015–16	Gardner–Webb	17–16	10–8	T–5th	
2016–17	Gardner–Webb	19–14	11–7	4th	
2017–18	Gardner–Webb	14–18	9–9	T–5th	
2018–19	Gardner–Webb	23–12	10–6	T–3rd	NCAA first round
2019–20	Gardner–Webb	16–16	11–7	3rd	
2020–21	Gardner–Webb	11–15	10–10	T–5th	
2021–22	Gardner–Webb	18–13	11–5	2nd (South)	
2022–23	Gardner–Webb	15–15	10–8	T–4th	
2023–24	Gardner–Webb	17–16	11–5	3rd	
Gardner–Webb:		188–166 (.531)	113–79 (.589)		
Western Carolina Catamounts (Southern Conference) (2024–present)
2024–25	Western Carolina	8–22	4–14	9th	
2025–26	Western Carolina	15–16	10–8	T–5th	
Western Carolina:		23–38 (.377)	14–22 (.389)		
Total:		211–204 (.508)			
National champion Postseason invitational champion Conference regular season champion Conference regular season and conference tournament champion Division regular season champion Division regular season and conference tournament champion Conference tournament champion

== Early career ==
While completing his undergraduate degree in history at the University of Florida, Craft served as a student manager for the Gators baseball team under head coach Andy Lopez.
