= Mark Prosser =

American basketball player and coach (born 1978)

Current position
- Title: Head coach
- Team: Winthrop
- Conference: Big South
- Record: 101–69 (.594)

Biographical details
- Born: October 10, 1978 (age 48); Wheeling, West Virginia, U.S.

Playing career
- 1998–1999: Marist

Coaching career (HC unless noted)
- 1999–2002: Marist (student assistant)
- 2002–2003: Wofford (assistant)
- 2003–2008: Bucknell (assistant)
- 2008–2011: Wofford (assistant)
- 2011–2012: Brevard
- 2012–2018: Winthrop (assistant)
- 2018–2021: Western Carolina
- 2021–present: Winthrop

Head coaching record
- Overall: 143–145 (.497)

Accomplishments and honors

Championships
- Big South South Division (2022)

Awards
- Skip Prosser Award (2020); Big South co-Coach of the Year (2026)

Mark Prosser (born October 10, 1978) is an American college basketball coach and current head coach of the Winthrop Eagles men's basketball team.

== Playing career ==
Prosser played one season of basketball at Marist before injuries stopped a playing career. He continued on with the Red Foxes as a student assistant coach until his graduation in 2002.

== Coaching career ==
=== Coaching beginnings ===
After graduation, Prosser landed his first assistant coaching position at Wofford under Mike Young, where he stayed for one season before heading to Bucknell for a five-year stint as an assistant for Pat Flannery, where he was part of the Bison staff when the team upset Kansas during the 2005 NCAA tournament. Prosser returned to Wofford in 2008 where he stayed until 2011 when he accepted the head coaching job at Division II Brevard College. In one season at Brevard, Prosser recorded a 5-23 record, and subsequently resigned his position to accept a coaching position under Pat Kelsey at Winthrop.

=== Western Carolina ===
On March 27, 2018, Prosser became the 18th head coach in Western Carolina history, replacing Larry Hunter.

==== 2018-19: First season ====
Prosser led the Catamounts to a 7–25 record (4–14 in the Southern Conference) in his first season.

==== 2019-20: 12 win improvement ====
In his second season at Western Carolina, Prosser guided the Catamounts to a 19-12 record as WCU finished with the second-most improved mark across NCAA Division I men's basketball. The Catamounts reached the SoCon Tournament semifinals for the first time since the 2015–16 season, and had a pair of First Team All-Southern Conference and NABC All-District players in senior forward Carlos Dotson and redshirt junior guard Mason Faulkner. College Insider recognized Prosser's achievement as he was honored with the Skip Prosser 'Man of the Year' Award, named after his father.

==== 2020-21: COVID struggles ====
Coming into 2020–21 looking to continue off last season's success, Prosser led the team to an 11–16 record (4–13 in Southern Conference). After a 7–2 start, the Catamounts struggled in conference play, winning just 4 of their next 17 games and losing in the first round of the Southern Conference tournament.

=== Winthrop ===
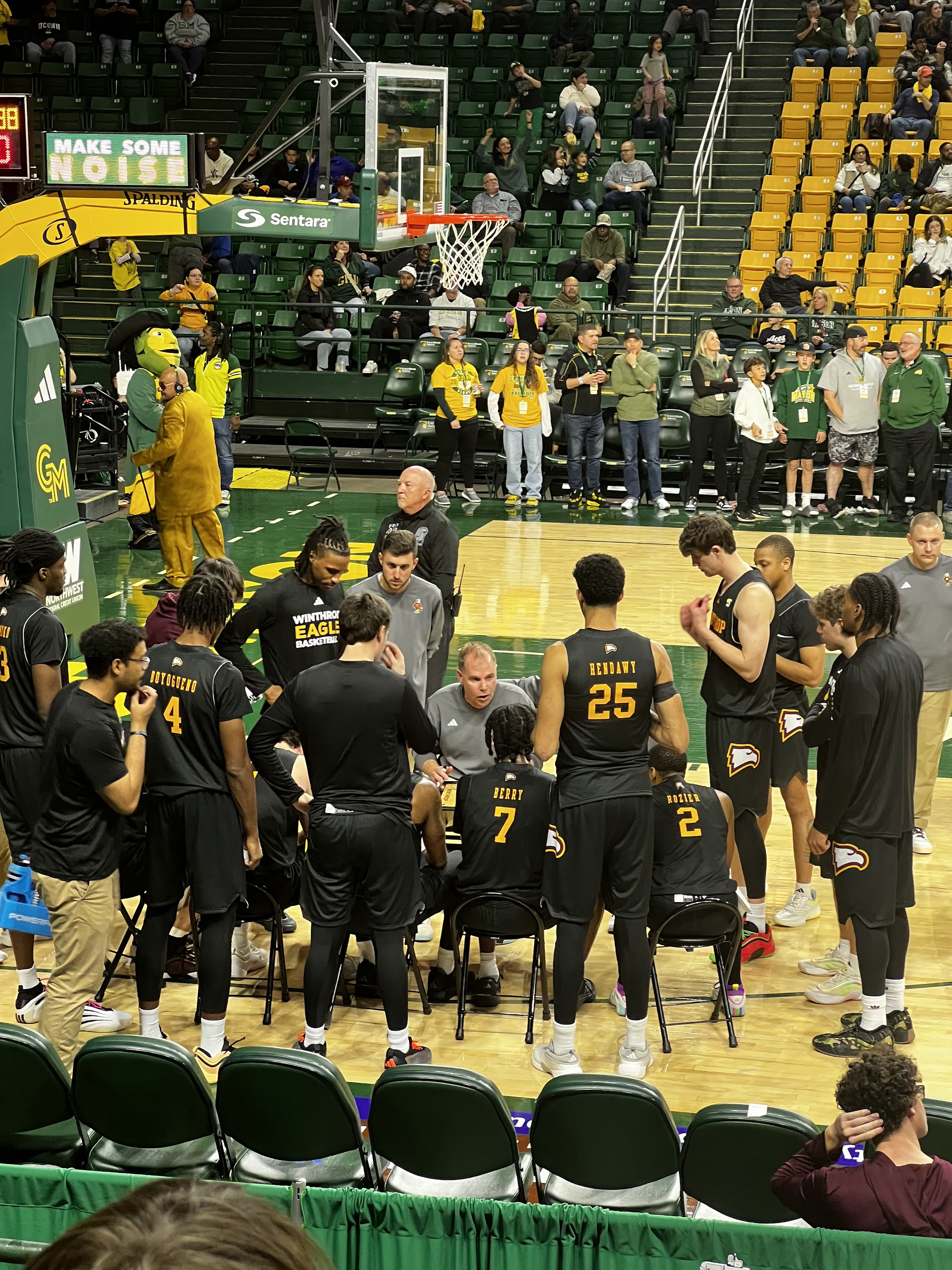
Mark Prosser leading a huddle in a Winthrop away game against George Mason (2025)

On April 2, 2021, Prosser's return to Winthrop was made official, as he replaced Pat Kelsey as head coach. Prosser previously served as Associate Head Coach for the team from 2013–2018. Six games into his first season, the Eagles beat the University of Washington to notch Prosser's first win as head coach at WU against a Power 5 conference and Winthrop's first win ever against a PAC-12 team. The 2021–22 team went undefeated at home (13-0), which hadn't been done since the nationally ranked 2006–07 team, and finished the regular season first in the South Division and second overall in the Big South. Prosser's 14 regular season league wins are tied for the most all time in the history of the Big South for a first year Head Coach in the league alongside Terry Truax who won 14 games in 1992–93. Additionally, Prosser's 23 wins on the season are the most in Winthrop and Big South history for a coach in his first year.

== Personal life ==
Prosser is the son of the late Skip Prosser, the former head coach at Xavier and Wake Forest.

== Head coaching record ==
Record table
Season	Team	Overall	Conference	Standing	Postseason
Brevard Tornados (South Atlantic Conference) (2011–2012)
2011–12	Brevard	5–23	4–14	8th	
Brevard:		5–23 (.179)	4–14 (.222)		
Western Carolina Catamounts (Southern Conference) (2018–2021)
2018–19	Western Carolina	7–25	4–14	T–8th	
2019–20	Western Carolina	19–12	10–8	T–5th	
2020–21	Western Carolina	11–16	4–13	9th	
Western Carolina:		37–53 (.411)	18–35 (.340)		
Winthrop (Big South Conference) (2021–present)
2021–22	Winthrop	23–9	14–2	1st (South)	
2022–23	Winthrop	15–17	10–8	T–4th	
2023–24	Winthrop	17–15	8–8	4th	
2024–25	Winthrop	23–11	11–5	T–2nd	
2025–26	Winthrop	23–11	13–3	2nd	
2026–27	Winthrop	0–6	0–0		
Winthrop:		101–69 (.594)	56–26 (.683)		
Total:		143–145 (.497)			
National champion Postseason invitational champion Conference regular season champion Conference regular season and conference tournament champion Division regular season champion Division regular season and conference tournament champion Conference tournament champion
