= Western Carolina Catamounts men's basketball =

Men's basketball program representing Western Carolina University

Western Carolina Catamounts
2025–26 Western Carolina Catamounts men's basketball team
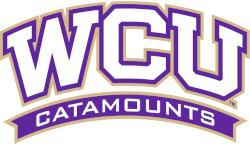
- University: Western Carolina University
- Head coach: Tim Craft (2nd season)
- Conference: SoCon
- Location: Cullowhee, North Carolina
- Arena: Ramsey Center (capacity: 7,826)
- Nickname: Catamounts
- Colors: Purple and gold

NCAA tournament appearances
- 1996

Conference tournament champions
- 1996

Conference division regular-season champions
- 1996, 2009, 2011

The Western Carolina Catamounts men's basketball team is the intercollegiate men' basketball team that represents Western Carolina University. The team currently competes in the Southern Conference. Western Carolina won the 1996 Southern Conference tournament and participated in the 1996 NCAA tournament.

== Team history ==
The school's first basketball team convened for the 1928-29 season and has played continuously since. The Catamounts were 1930 Southeastern Junior College champions and made their first NAIA tournament appearance in 1947. Jim Gudger brought success to the program, leading them to its first 20-win season in 1952-53, a North State Conference tournament championship in 1959, two Carolinas Intercollegiate Athletic Conference tournament championships in 1962 and 1963, four NAIA District tournament appearances in 1959, 1963, 1966, and 1968, and an appearance in the 1963 NAIA national championship game where the Catamounts lost to Texas-Pan American (now UT Rio Grande Valley). After leaving for Texas A&M, Commerce, Gudger was succeeded by Jim Hartbarger who continued the Catamounts success by appearing in the 1971 and 1972 NAIA District tournaments. After moving to NCAA Division I, the Catamounts made their first appearance in the NCAA tournament in 1996 after winning the 1996 Southern Conference tournament. They fell to 1 seed Purdue 71-73, almost becoming the first 16 seed to beat a 1 seed in NCAA tournament history.

=== Larry Hunter (2005-2018) ===
In 2005, Western Carolina hired N.C. State assistant coach, and former Ohio and Wittenberg head coach, Larry Hunter to succeed Steve Shurina as head coach. Hunter led the Catamounts to their first winning season since 1999-00 with a record of 16-15 and a co-Southern Conference North Division title during the 2008-09 season. Hunter followed up this success in 2009-10 by leading the Catamounts to a 22-12 record and an appearance in the 2010 CollegeInsider.com Tournament, their first 20-win season since 1971-72 and their first postseason berth since 1996. Hunter again led the Catamounts to a co-Southern Conference North Division title during the 2010-11 season. On February 2, 2012, Hunter won his 100th game as head coach of the Catamounts with an 82-76 win over Chattanooga. The Catamounts made an improbable run to the 2012 Southern Conference tournament championship game before falling to Davidson 91-93 in double overtime, their first appearance in the championship game since 1996. Hunter led the Catamounts to another run during the 2014 Southern Conference tournament, this time falling to Wofford 53-56 in the championship. Hunter returned the Catamounts to the postseason in 2016, accepting a bid to the College Basketball Invitational (CBI) where they fell to Vermont in the first round. Larry Hunter resigned as head basketball coach on March 4, 2018. He finished his career at Western Carolina with a record of 193-229, two postseason appearances, and two divisional titles.

=== Mark Prosser (2018-2021) ===
Mark Prosser was hired to succeed Larry Hunter on March 27, 2018. After leading the team to a 7-25 record in his first season, Prosser led the Catamounts to a 19-12 record during the 2019-20 season. The 12 win improvement was the second-most in Division I. The Catamounts were set to compete in a postseason tournament before the COVID-19 pandemic canceled all postseason basketball tournaments. After leading the team to an 11-16 record during the 2020-21 season, Prosser accepted the head coaching job at Winthrop.

=== Justin Gray (2021-2024) ===
On April 13, 2021, former Wake Forest standout Justin Gray was hired as Prosser's successor, the 19th head coach in program history. Leading the team to a 11-21 record in his first season, Gray turned a corner and led the Catamounts to a 18-16 record and 4th place finish in the Southern Conference, their best finish since 2014-15. Gray again led the Catamounts to a 4th place finish in the Southern Conference in his third year, finishing with a 22-10 record during the 2023-24 season. The 22 wins were the most in a season for the Catamounts since 2009-10. After a successful three-year stint, Gray accepted the head coaching job at Coastal Carolina.

=== Tim Craft (2024-present) ===
On March 13, 2024, Tim Craft was hired from Gardner-Webb to become the next head coach, succeeding Gray.

== Facilities ==
Breese Gymnasium served as the home of Catamounts basketball until 1956. The team moved into the larger Reid Gymnasium the next year and played there until 1986. The success under Jim Gudger, combined with the compacted seating, gave a home-court advantage to the Catamounts. The Catamounts moved to the Ramsey Center in 1986 and have played there since. The Ramsey Center was dedicated in front of a still-record crowd of 8,114 when the Catamounts hosted N.C. State on December 6, 1986. In addition to hosting N.C. State, the Catamounts have also hosted Kansas, Florida State, and South Carolina in the Ramsey Center.

== Notable players and coaches ==
=== Catamounts in the NBA ===
Western Carolina Catamounts in the NBA
Player	Position	Years in NBA
Mel Gibson	G	1963-1964
Bubba Wilson	SG	1978-1980
Frankie King	G	1995-1997
Jarvis Hayes	SF	2003-2010
Kevin Martin	SG	2004-2016

== Rivalries ==
=== App State ===
Western Carolina and Appalachian State played their first game against each other on December 16, 1927. The two teams met consistently until Appalachain State moved to the Sun Belt Conference in 2014. The last game between the two teams occurred on December 4, 2017, with the Catamounts winning 72-71 on a last-second dunk by Mike Amius. Appalachian State leads the all-time series 108-68.

== Seasons ==
Since 2009-10

Statistics overview
Season	Coach	Overall	Conference	Standing	Postseason
2009-10	Larry Hunter	22–12	11–7	T-4th	CIT First round
2010-11	Larry Hunter	18–15	12–6	T-3rd	
2011-12	Larry Hunter	17–18	8–10	T-7th	
2012-13	Larry Hunter	14–19	9–9	T-5th	
2013-14	Larry Hunter	19–15	10–6	5th	
2014-15	Larry Hunter	14–16	8–8	4th	
2015-16	Larry Hunter	16–18	10–8	T-5th	CBI First round
2016-17	Larry Hunter	9–23	4–14	T-8th	
2017-18	Larry Hunter	13–19	8–10	6th	
2018-19	Mark Prosser	7–25	4–14	T-8th	
2019-20	Mark Prosser	19–12	10–8	T-5th	
2020-21	Mark Prosser	11–16	4–13	9th	
2021-22	Justin Gray	11–21	5–13	10th	
2022-23	Justin Gray	18–16	10–8	4th	CBI First Round
2023-24	Justin Gray	22–10	11–7	4th	
2024-25	Tim Craft	8–22	4–14	9th	
Total:					
National champion Postseason invitational champion Conference regular season champion Conference regular season and conference tournament champion Division regular season champion Division regular season and conference tournament champion Conference tournament champion

== Notable moments ==
=== First 3-point shot in NCAA history ===
On November 29, 1980, Ronnie Carr hit the first 3-point shot in NCAA history against Middle Tennessee State in Reid Gymnasium. The ball is currently on display at the Basketball Hall of Fame.

=== Appalachian State free throw ===
On December 9, 2012, in a game against Appalachian State in Cullowhee, Mountaineer center Brian Okam shot a free throw that landed 10 feet short of the basket. A Western Carolina TV analyst commentating on the game soon reacted, in a surprised manner, "I'm not sure what that was. Good lord." The incident has gone viral on YouTube, reaching over 19 million views.

== Postseason appearances ==
=== NCAA tournament ===
The Catamounts have appeared in one NCAA tournament. Their record is 0–1. In the 1996 Tournament, Western Carolina was seeded #16 and played #1 seed Purdue close before falling 71–73.

Year	Round	Opponent	Result
1996	Round of 64	#1 Purdue	L 71–73

=== CIT ===
The Catamounts have appeared in one CollegeInsider.com Postseason Tournament (CIT). Their record is 0–1.

Year	Round	Opponent	Result
2010	First round	Marshall	L 88–90

=== CBI ===
The Catamounts have appeared in two College Basketball Invitational (CBI) tournaments. Their combined record is 0–2.

Year	Round	Opponent	Result
2016	First round	Vermont	L 74–79
2023	First round	Charlotte	L 56–65

=== NAIA tournament ===
The Catamounts have appeared in seven NAIA tournaments. Their record in the National tournament is 4–3 while their record in the District tournament is 6–4. In the 1963 tournament, the Catamounts made it to the national championship game where they lost to Pan American.

Year	Tournament	Round	Opponent	Result
1947	National	First round	Canterbury (Ind.)	L 55–68
1959	District; District	Semifinals; Finals	Wofford; Lenoir-Rhyne	W 74–58; L 42–48
1963	District; District; National; National; National; National; National	Semifinals; Finals; First round Second round Elite Eight; Semifinals; Championship	Erskine; Lenoir-Rhyne; Montana State - Billings; Miles; Lewis & Clark; Fort Hays State; Pan American	W 52–51; W 64–56; W 64–61; W 107–86; W 77–57; W 100–84; L 62–73
1966	District	Semifinals	Erskine	L 58–68
1968	District	Semifinals	Pembroke State	L 76–93
1971	District; District	Semifinals; Finals	Newberry; UNC Asheville	W 69–68; L 61–62
1972	District; District; National	Semifinals; Finals; First round	Mars Hill; Newberry; Pittsburg State	W 68–65; W 84–68; L 75–98
