= Charleston Cougars men's basketball statistical leaders =

The Charleston Cougars men's basketball statistical leaders are individual statistical leaders of the College of Charleston Cougars men's basketball program in various categories, including points, rebounds, assists, steals, and blocks. Within those areas, the lists identify single-game, single-season, and career leaders. The Cougars represent the College of Charleston in the NCAA Division I Coastal Athletic Association.

Charleston began competing in intercollegiate basketball in 1898. However, the school's record book does not generally list records from before the 1950s, as records from before this period are often incomplete and inconsistent. Since scoring was much lower in this era, and teams played much fewer games during a typical season, it is likely that few or no players from this era would appear on these lists anyway.

The NCAA did not officially record assists as a stat until the 1983–84 season, and blocks and steals until the 1985–86 season, but Charleston's record books includes players in these stats before these seasons. These lists are updated through the end of the 2023–24 season.

== Scoring ==
Career
Rk	Player	Points	Seasons
1	Andrew Goudelock	2571	2007–08 2008–09 2009–10 2010–11
2	Grant Riller	2474	2016–17 2017–18 2018–19 2019–20
3	Ken Gustafson	2135	1971–72 1972–73 1973–74 1974–75
4	Jarrell Brantley	1914	2015–16 2016–17 2017–18 2018–19
5	Greg Mack	1901	1981–82 1982–83 1983–84 1984–85
6	Joe Chealey	1827	2013–14 2014–15 2016–17 2017–18
7	Sam Meade	1812	1970–71 1971–72 1972–73 1973–74
8	Thaddeous Delaney	1564	1993–94 1994–95 1995–96 1996–97
9	Dontaye Draper	1541	2003–04 2004–05 2005–06 2006–07
10	Jeff Bolton	1527	1998–99 1999–00 2000–01 2001–02

Season
Rk	Player	Points	Season
1	Andrew Goudelock	877	2010–11
2	Greg Mack	740	1984–85
3	Grant Riller	724	2018–19
4	Grant Riller	678	2019–20
5	Andrew Goudelock	658	2009–10
6	Ken Gustafson	645	1974–75
7	Jarrell Brantley	640	2018–19
8	Joe Chealey	623	2016–17
9	Grant Riller	613	2017–18
10	Joe Chealey	611	2017–18

Single game
Rk	Player	Points	Season	Opponent
1	Sam Meade	45	1970–71	Clinch Valley
2	Grant Riller	43	2018–19	Hofstra
3	Donnelly McCants	40	1989–90	UNC Asheville
4	Andrew Goudelock	39	2010–11	Dayton
	Ante Brzovic	39	2024–25	Florida Atlantic
6	Ken Gustafson	38	1972–73	Francis Marion
	Ken Gustafson	38	1974–75	Limestone
	Dontaye Draper	38	2006–07	App State
	Zep Jasper	38	2020–21	Columbus State
10	Ken Gustafson	37	1974–75	Wofford
	Grant Riller	37	2017–18	W&M

== Rebounds ==
Career
Rk	Player	Rebounds	Seasons
1	Ken Gustafson	1484	1971–72 1972–73 1973–74 1974–75
2	Thaddeous Delaney	1119	1993–94 1994–95 1995–96 1996–97
3	John Drafts	1009	1974–75 1975–76 1976–77 1977–78
4	Jarrell Brantley	967	2015–16 2016–17 2017–18 2018–19
5	Jermaine Johnson	949	2005–06 2006–07 2007–08 2008–09
6	Adjehi Baru	916	2011–12 2012–13 2013–14 2014–15
7	Sam Meade	846	1970–71 1971–72 1972–73 1973–74
8	Willis Hall	843	2009–10 2010–11 2012–13 2013–14
9	Greg Mack	842	1981–82 1982–83 1983–84 1984–85
10	Jody Lumpkin	710	1998–99 1999–00 2000–01

Season
Rk	Player	Rebounds	Season
1	Ken Gustafson	440	1974–75
2	Ken Gustafson	360	1973–74
3	Ken Gustafson	358	1972–73
4	John Drafts	358	1975–76
5	Thaddeous Delaney	330	1995–96
6	Ken Gustafson	326	1971–72
7	Thaddeous Delaney	303	1996–97
8	Jarrell Brantley	294	2016–17
9	Greg Mack	293	1984–85
	Willis Hall	293	2013–14

Single game
Rk	Player	Rebounds	Season	Opponent
1	John Drafts	26	1975–76	Mars Hill
2	Rick Carpenter	25	1970–71	Florida Tech
3	Ken Gustafson	22	1971–72	CSU
4	Ken Gustafson	21	1974–75	CSU
	Thaddeous Delaney	21	1995–96	CSU
	Willis Hall	21	2013–14	Davidson
7	Ken Gustafson	20	1973–74	Claflin
	Ken Gustafson	20	1974–75	Francis Marion
	Ken Gustafson	20	1974–75	Limestone
	Kevan Elliott	20	1975–76	Presbyterian
	Thaddeous Delaney	20	1994–95	SE Louisiana
	Thaddeous Delaney	20	1995–96	Campbell

== Assists ==
Career
Rk	Player	Assists	Seasons
1	Anthony Johnson	520	1992–93 1994–95 1995–96 1996–97
2	A.J. Harris	514	1999–00 2000–01 2001–02 2002–03
3	Mike Beckett	431	1988–89 1989–90 1990–91 1991–92
4	Mark McClam	428	1978–79 1979–80 1980–81 1981–82
	Shane McCravy	428	1995–96 1996–97 1997–98 1998–99
6	Andrew Goudelock	424	2007–08 2008–09 2009–10 2010–11
7	Dontaye Draper	423	2003–04 2004–05 2005–06 2006–07
8	Joe Chealey	397	2013–14 2014–15 2016–17 2017–18
9	Andrew Lawrence	393	2009–10 2010–11 2011–12 2012–13
10	Marion Busby	390	1991–92 1992–93 1993–94 1994–95

Season
Rk	Player	Assists	Season
1	Anthony Johnson	229	1996–97
2	Gus Beasley	226	1987–88
3	CJ Fulton	209	2024–25
4	Anthony Johnson	193	1995–96
5	Dontaye Draper	176	2006–07
6	Stephen Yetman	174	1982–83
7	Jlynn Counter	173	2025–26
8	A.J. Harris	171	2002–03
	Andrew Lawrence	171	2011–12
10	Ed Nierstedt	163	1984–85

Single game
Rk	Player	Assists	Season	Opponent
1	Mark McClam	14	1979–80	Pfeiffer
2	Anthony Johnson	12	1995–96	FIU
	CJ Fulton	12	2024–25	Hofstra
4	Gus Beasley	11	1987–88	Erskine
	Gus Beasley	11	1987–88	Ozarks
	Anthony Johnson	11	1995–96	Georgia State
	Anthony Johnson	11	1995–96	Wofford
	Anthony Johnson	11	1995–96	SE Louisiana
	Anthony Johnson	11	1996–97	FAU
	Anthony Johnson	11	1996–97	Campbell
	Anthony Johnson	11	1996–97	Centenary
	Shane McCravy	11	1997–98	CSU
	A.J. Harris	11	1999–00	Southern Wesleyan
	A.J. Harris	11	2000–01	Chattanooga
	Drew Hall	11	2004–05	Canisius
	Dontaye Draper	11	2006–07	Wofford
	Andrew Goudelock	11	2009–10	Western Carolina
	CJ Fulton	11	2024–25	Stony Brook
	CJ Fulton	11	2024–25	North Carolina A&T
	Jlynn Counter	11	2025–26	Northeastern

== Steals ==
Career
Rk	Player	Steals	Seasons
1	Steven Johnson	217	1984–85 1985–86 1986–87 1987–88
2	Dontaye Draper	212	2003–04 2004–05 2005–06 2006–07
3	Sedric Webber	205	1995–96 1996–97 1997–98 1998–99
4	Marcus Woods	186	1991–92 1992–93 1993–94 1994–95
5	Shane McCravy	177	1995–96 1996–97 1997–98 1998–99
6	Marion Busby	173	1991–92 1992–93 1993–94 1994–95
7	Tony Mitchell	166	2001–02 2002–03 2003–04 2004–05
8	Grant Riller	165	2016–17 2017–18 2018–19 2019–20
9	Andrew Lawrence	162	2009–10 2010–11 2011–12 2012–13
10	Jermel President	157	1995–96 1996–97 1997–98 1998–99

Season
Rk	Player	Steals	Season
1	Marcus Woods	84	1992–93
2	Steven Johnson	79	1986–87
3	Stephen Yetman	75	1982–83
4	Steven Johnson	73	1987–88
5	Brevin Galloway	69	2019–20
6	Sedric Webber	68	1998–99
7	Sedric Webber	67	1997–98
	Dimitrius Underwood	67	2021–22
9	Shane McCravy	63	1997–98
10	Dontaye Draper	62	2005–06

Single game
Rk	Player	Steals	Season	Opponent
1	Mike Beckett	8	1990–91	Winthrop
2	Marcus Woods	7	1992–93	Virginia
	Shane McCravy	7	1998–99	Coastal Carolina
	Payton Hulsey	7	2015–16	Delaware
5	Derald Preston	6	1989–90	Radford
	Marcus Woods	6	1991–92	Coastal Carolina
	Mike Beckett	6	1991–92	East Carolina
	Marcus Woods	6	1992–93	NC Wesleyan
	Marcus Woods	6	1992–93	FAU
	Marcus Woods	6	1992–93	UCF
	Marcus Woods	6	1992–93	Georgia State
	Dean Dunbar	6	1993–94	Centenary
	Stacy Harris	6	1993–94	Mercer
	Jermel President	6	1995–96	UCF
	Jermel President	6	1996–97	Campbell
	Sedric Webber	6	1997–98	Guilford
	Marc Himes	6	1997–98	Campbell
	Jody Lumpkin	6	1999–00	CSU
	Dontaye Draper	6	2005–06	Furman
	Canyon Barry	6	2014–15	SC State
	Grant Riller	6	2016–17	Drexel
	Brevin Galloway	6	2019–20	Hofstra
	Brevin Galloway	6	2019–20	Drexel
	CJ Fulton	6	2023–24	Rhode Island
	Connor Hickman	6	2025–26	North Carolina A&T

== Blocks ==
Career
Rk	Player	Blocks	Seasons
1	Jody Lumpkin	238	1998–99 1999–00 2000–01
2	Mike Benton	224	1999–00 2001–02 2002–03 2003–04
3	Thaddeous Delaney	203	1993–94 1994–95 1995–96 1996–97
4	Jeremy Simmons	139	2007–08 2008–09 2009–10 2010–11
5	Adjehi Baru	126	2011–12 2012–13 2013–14 2014–15
6	Antwaine Wiggins	122	2007–08 2008–09 2010–11 2011–12
7	Nick Harris	121	2015–16 2016–17 2017–18 2018–19
8	Chris Jackson	102	1989–90 1990–91 1991–92 1992–93
9	Ed Bigelow	89	1983–84 1984–85 1985–86 1986–87
	Dustin Scott	89	2007–08 2008–09

Season
Rk	Player	Blocks	Season
1	Jody Lumpkin	93	1999–00
2	Mike Benton	82	2003–04
3	Jody Lumpkin	79	2000–01
	Chol Machot	79	2025–26
5	Mike Benton	74	2002–03
6	Jody Lumpkin	66	1998–99
7	Thaddeous Delaney	63	1996–97
8	Jeremy Simmons	56	2009–10
9	Mike Benton	55	2001–02
10	Thaddeous Delaney	50	1995–96

Single game
Rk	Player	Blocks	Season	Opponent
1	Thaddeous Delaney	8	1996–97	CSU
2	Jody Lumpkin	7	1999–00	Tennessee Tech
	Jody Lumpkin	7	1999–00	ETSU
	Jody Lumpkin	7	1999–00	CSU
	Jody Lumpkin	7	2000–01	Delaware
	Mike Benton	7	2003–04	UNCW
	Philip McCandies	7	2006–07	Georgia Southern
	Chol Machot	7	2025–26	Elon
9	Thaddeous Delaney	6	1993–94	Samford
	Thaddeous Delaney	6	1996–97	Maryland
	Jody Lumpkin	6	1998–99	UNCG
	Jody Lumpkin	6	1998–99	Wofford
	Jody Lumpkin	6	1999–00	App State
	Jody Lumpkin	6	2000–01	CSU
	Jody Lumpkin	6	2000–01	VMI
	Mike Benton	6	2001–02	Chattanooga
	Mike Benton	6	2002–03	VMI
	Mike Benton	6	2003–04	Long Island
	Mike Benton	6	2003–04	Bucknell
	Chol Machot	6	2025–26	South Florida
	Chol Machot	6	2025–26	Hampton
	Chol Machot	6	2025–26	Campbell
