= List of Charleston Cougars men's basketball seasons =

This is a list of seasons completed by the Charleston Cougars men's college basketball team.

== Season-by-season results ==
Statistics overview
Season	Coach	Overall	Conference	Standing	Postseason
Unknown (Independent) (1898–1920)
1898–1920	Unknown	N/A			
Vince McCormick (Independent) (1920–1922)
1920–21	Vince McCormick	0–10			
1921–22	Vince McCormick	0–10			
Vince McCormick:		0–20 (.000)			
A.C. Jervey (Independent) (1922–1923)
1922–23	A.C. Jervey	0–8			
Carl Fudge (Independent) (1923–1924)
1923–24	Carl Fudge	0–9			
Alfred "Fritz" Von Kolnitz (Independent) (1924–1926)
1924–25	Fritz Von Kolnitz	3–4			
1925–26	Fritz Von Kolnitz	4–9			SIAA Quarterfinal
Alfred "Fritz" von Kolnitz:		7–12 (.368)			
Frank Myers (Independent) (1926–1930)
1926–27	Frank Myers	1–13			SIAA Quarterfinal
1927–28	Frank Myers	1–9			
1928–29	Frank Myers	0–10			
1929–30	Frank Myers	2–3			
Frank Myers:		4–35 (.103)			
Doc Morse (Independent) (1930–1933)
1930–31	Doc Morse	10–7			
1931–32	Doc Morse	2–6			
1932–33	Doc Morse	0–5			
Doc Morse:		12–18 (.400)			
Ernest Wehman (Independent) (1933–1942)
1933–34	Ernest Wehman	6–8			
1934–35	Ernest Wehman	10–8			SIAA First Round
1935–36	Ernest Wehman	7–8			
1936–37	Ernest Wehman	9–11			
1937–38	Ernest Wehman	4–17			
1938–39	Ernest Wehman	0–10			
1939–40	Ernest Wehman	2–12			
1940–41	Ernest Wehman	8–9			
1941–42	Ernest Wehman	9–9			
Gerald McMahon (Independent) (1942–1943)
1942–43	Gerald McMahon	9–11			
Willard Silcox (Independent) (1943–1944)
1943–44	Willard Silcox	2–2			
Buck Bierfischer (Independent) (1944–1946)
1944–45	Buck Bierfischer	0–3			
1945–46	Buck Bierfischer	4–8			
Buck Bierfischer:		4–11 (.267)			
Henry Anderson (Independent) (1946–1948)
1946–47	Henry Anderson	11–9			
1947–48	Henry Anderson	9–10			
Henry Anderson:		20–19 (.513)			
Willard Silcox (Independent) (1948–1953)
1948–49	Willard Silcox	6–16			
1949–50	Willard Silcox	7–12			
1950–51	Willard Silcox	4–19			
1951–52	Willard Silcox	6–8			
1952–53	Willard Silcox	2–6			
Vincent Price (Independent) (1953–1955)
1953–54	Vincent Price	4–11			
1954–55	Vincent Price	3–12			
Vincent Price:		7–23 (.233)			
Willard Silcox (Independent) (1955–1956)
1955–56	Willard Silcox	2–14			
Willard Silcox:		29–77 (.274)			
Bernie Puckhaber (Independent) (1956–1957)
1956–57	Bernie Puckhaber	2–14			
Ernest Wehman (Independent) (1957–1958)
1957–58	Ernest Wehman	1–12			
Ernest Wehman:		56–104 (.350)			
Jerry Callahan (Independent) (1958–1960)
1958–59	Jerry Callahan	1–10			
1959–60	Jerry Callahan	3–11			
Jerry Callahan:		4–21 (.160)			
Archie Jenkins (Independent) (1960–1962)
1960–61	Archie Jenkins	3–11			
1961–62	Archie Jenkins	7–15			
Archie Jenkins:		10–26 (.278)			
Pat Harden (Independent) (1962–1973)
1962–63	Pat Harden	5–12			
Pat Harden (Dixie Intercollegiate Athletic Conference) (1963–1970)
1963–64	Pat Harden	11–16	6–4	3rd	Dixie Tournament Champions
1964–65	Pat Harden	7–13	5–5	3rd	
1965–66	Pat Harden	4–17	2–8	6th	
1966–67	Pat Harden	0–19	0–11	7th	
1967–68	Pat Harden	6–17	1–11	7th	
Pat Harden:		33–94 (.260)	14–39 (.264)		
Fred Daniels (Dixie Intercollegiate Athletic Conference) (1968–1970)
1968–69	Fred Daniels	9–15	7–7	5th	
1969–70	Fred Daniels	9–18	5–9	6th	
Fred Daniels:		18–33 (.353)	12–16 (.429)		
Alan LeForce (NAIA Independent) (1970–1979)
1970–71	Alan LeForce	11–16			
1971–72	Alan LeForce	11–12			
1972–73	Alan LeForce	16–10			
1973–74	Alan LeForce	18–9		District 6 Quarterfinal	
1974–75	Alan LeForce	20–9		District 6 Semifinal	
1975–76	Alan LeForce	17–10		District 6 Quarterfinal	
1976–77	Alan LeForce	13–12			
1977–78	Alan LeForce	14–14		District 6 Quarterfinal	
1978–79	Alan LeForce	12–16			
Alan LeForce:		132–108 (.550)			
John Kresse (NAIA Independent) (1979–1989)
1979–80	John Kresse	17–11		District 6 Quarterfinal	
1980–81	John Kresse	25–5		District 6 Semifinal	
1981–82	John Kresse	25–5		District 6 Runner Up	
1982–83	John Kresse	33–5		District 6 Champions	NAIA National Champions
1983–84	John Kresse	25–7		District 6 Runner Up	
1984–85	John Kresse	30–4		District 6 Champions	NAIA Quarterfinal
1985–86	John Kresse	26–9		District 6 Champions	NAIA Quarterfinal
1986–87	John Kresse	31–2		District 6 Champions	NAIA Second Round
1987–88	John Kresse	30–5		District 6 Champions	NAIA Third Place
1988–89	John Kresse	26–6		District 6 Champions	NAIA Second Round
John Kresse (Independent) (1989–1991)
1989–90	John Kresse	19–8			
1990–91	John Kresse	15–12			
John Kresse (NCAA Division I Independent) (1991–1993)
1991–92	John Kresse	19–8			
1992–93	John Kresse	19–8			
John Kresse (Trans America Athletic Conference) (1993–1998)
1993–94	John Kresse	24–4	14–2	1st	NCAA Division I First Round
1994–95	John Kresse	23–6	15–1	1st	NIT First Round
1995–96	John Kresse	25–4	15–1	1st (East)	NIT Second Round
1996–97	John Kresse	29–3	16–0	1st (East)	NCAA Division I Second Round
1997–98	John Kresse	24–6	14–2	1st (East)	NCAA Division I First Round
John Kresse (Southern Conference) (1998–2002)
1998–99	John Kresse	28–3	16–0	1st (South)	NCAA Division I First Round
1999–00	John Kresse	24–6	13–3	1st (South)	
2000–01	John Kresse	22–7	12–4	1st (South)	
2001–02	John Kresse	21–9	9–7	T–1st (South)	
John Kresse:		560–143 (.797)	124–20 (.861)		
Tom Herrion (Southern Conference) (2002–2006)
2002–03	Tom Herrion	25–8	13–3	1st (South)	NIT First Round
2003–04	Tom Herrion	20–9	11–5	T–1st (South)	
2004–05	Tom Herrion	18–10	10–6	T–2nd (South)	
2005–06	Tom Herrion	17–11	9–6	3rd (South)	
Tom Herrion:		80–38 (.678)	43–20 (.683)		
Bobby Cremins (Southern Conference) (2006–2012)
2006–07	Bobby Cremins	22–11	13–5	2nd (South)	
2007–08	Bobby Cremins	16–17	9–11	3rd (South)	
2008–09	Bobby Cremins	27–9	15–5	T–2nd (South)	CBI Second Round
2009–10	Bobby Cremins	22–12	14–4	2nd (South)	CBI Second Round
2010–11	Bobby Cremins	26–11	14–4	T–1st (South)	NIT Quarterfinal
2011–12	Bobby Cremins; Mark Byington^{[Note A]}	19–12	10–8	4th (South)	
Bobby Cremins:		125–68 (.648)	75–37 (.670)		
Doug Wojcik (Southern Conference) (2012–2013)
2012–13	Doug Wojcik	24–11	14–4	2nd (South)	CBI First Round
Doug Wojcik (Colonial Athletic Association) (2013–2014)
2013–14	Doug Wojcik	14–18	6–10	T–6th	
Doug Wojcik:		38–29 (.567)	20–14 (.588)		
Earl Grant (Colonial Athletic Association) (2014–2021)
2014–15	Earl Grant	9–24	3–15	10th	
2015–16	Earl Grant	17–14	8–10	7th	
2016–17	Earl Grant	25–10	14–4	2nd	NIT First Round
2017–18	Earl Grant	26–8	14–4	T–1st	NCAA Division I First Round
2018–19	Earl Grant	24–9	12–6	3rd	
2019–20	Earl Grant	17–14	11–7	T–4th	
2020–21	Earl Grant	9–10	6–4	3rd	
Earl Grant:		127–89 (.588)	68–50 (.576)		
Pat Kelsey (Colonial/Coastal Athletic Association^{[Note B]}) (2021–2024)
2021–22	Pat Kelsey	17–15	8–10	6th	
2022–23	Pat Kelsey	31–4	16–2	T–1st	NCAA Division I First Round
2023–24	Pat Kelsey	27–8	15–3	1st	NCAA Division I First Round
Pat Kelsey:		75–27 (.735)	39–15 (.722)		
Chris Mack (Coastal Athletic Association) (2024–present)
2024–25	Chris Mack	24–9	13–5	3rd	
2025–26	Chris Mack	21–11	14–4	2nd	
Chris Mack:		45–20 (.692)	27–9 (.750)		
Total:		1,404–1,062 (.569)			
National champion Postseason invitational champion Conference regular season champion Conference regular season and conference tournament champion Division regular season champion Division regular season and conference tournament champion Conference tournament champion

^A. CofC finished the season 19–12 overall with interim head coach Mark Byington being credited with a 7–4 coaching record after Cremins' medical leave of absence on January 27, 2012.
^B. The Colonial Athletic Association rebranded and officially changed its name to the Coastal Athletic Association before the 2023–24 season.
