= 2021 NBA Summer League =

- League: National Basketball Association
- Sport: Basketball
- Duration: August 8–17
- Games: At least 5 games (including 4 preliminary games) for each team (as many as 7 games per team)
- Teams: California Classic-4; Salt Lake City-4; Las Vegas-30
- TV partner(s): NBA TV & ESPN

California Classic
- Season champions: Miami Heat
- Runners-up: Golden State Warriors
- Top scorer: Max Strus

Salt Lake City Summer League
- Season champions: Utah Jazz White Team
- Runners-up: Memphis Grizzlies
- Top scorer: Devin Vassell

Las Vegas NBA Summer League
- Season champions: Sacramento Kings
- Runners-up: Boston Celtics
- Season MVP: Cameron Thomas & Davion Mitchell (league); Louis King (championship game)

NBA Summer League seasons
- ← 2019 2022 →

The 2021 NBA Summer League was an off-season competition held by the National Basketball Association (NBA) at the Thomas and Mack Center and Cox Pavilion in Las Vegas, Nevada on the campus of University of Nevada, Las Vegas. The summer league consisted of the California Classic, Salt Lake City Summer League, and the Las Vegas NBA Summer League.

This was the first NBA Summer League since 2019 as the 2020 NBA Summer League was cancelled due to the ongoing COVID-19 pandemic, and due to the Bubble. It began on August 8, 2021, and ended on August 17. All 30 NBA teams participated in the reboot of the summer league. Teams competed in a tournament-style schedule in four preliminary games before seeding in a tournament; each team played four games, and the best two teams played in the championship, while the rest of the teams played another game the NBA decided on. The event concluded with the 2021 NBA Summer League Championship game on August 17.

== California Classic ==
The California Classic is an official summer league of the NBA—the third year it has been held. Four games were played at the Golden 1 Center on August 3 and 4.

=== Teams ===
- Miami Heat
- Sacramento Kings
- Los Angeles Lakers
- Golden State Warriors

==== Day 1 ====
Note: Times are EDT (UTC−4) as listed by the NBA.

ESPN2

August 3
8:00 pm

Boxscore

Los Angeles Lakers 78, Miami Heat 80
Scoring by quarter: 32–27, 17–19, 15–18, 14–16
| Pts: Cacok 15; Rebs: Cacok 7 Asts: Cacok 4 | Pts: Yurtseven 27; Rebs: Yurtseven 19; Asts: Carter 5 |

Golden 1 Center, Sacramento, California
Attendance: 0
Referees: Brandon Adair, Simone Jelks, Andy Nagy

ESPN2

August 3
11:00 pm

Boxscore

Golden State Warriors 89, Sacramento Kings 82 (OT)
Scoring by quarter: 13–16, 27–25, 21–21, 19–18, Overtime: 9–2
| Pts: Dowtin 21; Rebs: Mawugbe 10; Asts: McLaughlin 5 | Pts: Mitchell 23; Rebs: Terry 14; Asts: Coleman 4 |

Golden 1 Center, Sacramento, California
Attendance: 0
Referees: Suyash Mehta, Natalie Sago, Phenizee Ransom

==== Day 2 ====
ESPNU

August 4
8:00 pm

Boxscore

Miami Heat 94, Golden State Warriors 87
Scoring by quarter: 30–20, 21–23, 21–23, 22–21
| Pts: Strus 27; Rebs: Garrett 10; Asts: Smith 6 | Pts: Moody 19; Rebs: Payton II 8 Asts: Dowtin 5 |

Golden 1 Center, Sacramento, California
Attendance: 0
Referees: Brandon Adair, Simone Jelks, Phenizee Ransom

ESPNU

August 4
11:00 pm

Boxscore

Los Angeles Lakers 84, Sacramento Kings 74
Scoring by quarter: 15–18, 17–16, 19–23, 33–17
| Pts: Cacok 13; Rebs: Childs 8 Asts: Reaves 3 | Pts: King 19; Rebs: Terry 9 Asts: King 2 |

Golden 1 Center, Sacramento, California
Attendance: 0
Referees: Suyash Mehta, Natalie Sago, Andy Nagy

== Salt Lake City Summer League ==
The Salt Lake City Summer League is an official summer league of the NBA—the sixth year it has been held. Six games were played in a round-robin format over the course of three days on August 3, 4, and 6 at the Vivint Smart Home Arena.

=== Teams ===
- Memphis Grizzlies
- Utah Jazz (divided into a "white" and "blue" team)
- San Antonio Spurs

==== Day 1 ====
Note: Times are EDT (UTC−4) as listed by the NBA.

NBATV

August 3
7:00 pm

Boxscore

Memphis Grizzlies 104, Utah Jazz Blue 65
Scoring by quarter: 29–12, 28–16, 20–19, 27–18
| Pts: Weems 17; Rebs: Tillman 13; Asts: Caver 8 | Pts: Chealey 15; Rebs: Patton 10; Asts: Chealey 3 |

Vivint Smart Home Arena, Salt Lake City, Utah
Attendance: 4,726
Referees: Jenna Schroeder, John Butler, Evan Scott

NBATV

August 3
9:00 pm

Boxscore

San Antonio Spurs 58, Utah Jazz White 87
Scoring by quarter: 10–17, 21–17, 12–28, 15–25
| Pts: Turner 13; Rebs: Turner 7 Asts: Norvell Jr. 3 | Pts: Forrest 19; Rebs: Azubuike 14; Asts: Forrest 7 |

Vivint Smart Home Arena, Salt Lake City, Utah
Attendance: 4,726
Referees: Nate Green, Jonathan Sterling, Matt Meyers

==== Day 2 ====
ESPN3

August 4
7:00 pm

Boxscore

San Antonio Spurs 54, Utah Jazz Blue 78
Scoring by quarter: 18–24, 8–13, 13–20, 15–21
| Pts: Vassell 14; Rebs: Vassell 8 Asts: Primo 2 | Pts: Teague 26; Rebs: Sestina 9 Asts: Allman 5 |

Vivint Smart Home Arena, Salt Lake City, Utah
Attendance: 0
Referees: Jonathan Sterling, John Butler, Evan Scott

ESPN3

August 4
9:00 pm

Boxscore

Memphis Grizzlies 75, Utah Jazz White 94
Scoring by quarter: 18–26, 10–19, 22–24, 25–25
| Pts: Wallace 17; Rebs: Moore 6 Asts: Caver 7 | Pts: Azubuike 19; Rebs: Azubuike 11; Asts: Forrest 13 |

Vivint Smart Home Arena, Salt Lake City, Utah
Attendance: 4,611
Referees: Jenna Schroeder, Nate Green, Matt Meyers

==== Day 3 ====
ESPNU

August 6
7:00 pm

Boxscore

San Antonio Spurs 77, Memphis Grizzlies 82
Scoring by quarter: 22–14, 11–21, 16–31, 28–16
| Pts: Vassell 27; Rebs: Wieskamp 10; Asts: Primo 3 | Pts: Bane 24; Rebs: Konchar 11; Asts: Bane 5 |

Vivint Smart Home Arena, Salt Lake City, Utah
Attendance: 0
Referees: Nate Green, Jonathan Sterling, John Butler

ESPNU

August 6
9:00 pm

Boxscore

Utah Jazz Blue 65, Utah Jazz White 83
Scoring by quarter: 15–14, 10–21, 15–30, 25–18
| Pts: Teague 14; Rebs: Aaron 9 Asts: Allman Jr. 3 | Pts: Azubuike 14; Rebs: Morgan 10; Asts: Forrest 7 |

Vivint Smart Home Arena, Salt Lake City, Utah
Attendance: 5,499
Referees: Jenna Schroeder, Evan Scott, Matt Meyers

== Las Vegas NBA Summer League ==
The Las Vegas NBA Summer League is an official summer league of the NBA—the sixteenth year it has been held. 75 games are played between all 30 NBA teams from August 8 to 17. The league plays games across two venues: the Thomas and Mack Center and Cox Pavilion, both located in Paradise, Nevada (near Las Vegas). In the 2019 NBA Summer League, the Chinese and Croatian men's basketball teams participated in games, but they were not featured in the 2021 league.

=== Teams ===
- Atlanta Hawks
- Boston Celtics
- Brooklyn Nets
- Chicago Bulls
- Cleveland Cavaliers
- Charlotte Hornets
- Dallas Mavericks
- Detroit Pistons
- Denver Nuggets
- Golden State Warriors
- Houston Rockets
- Indiana Pacers
- Los Angeles Clippers
- Los Angeles Lakers
- Memphis Grizzlies
- Miami Heat
- Milwaukee Bucks
- Minnesota Timberwolves
- New Orleans Pelicans
- New York Knicks
- Oklahoma City Thunder
- Orlando Magic
- Philadelphia 76ers
- Phoenix Suns
- Portland Trail Blazers
- Sacramento Kings
- San Antonio Spurs
- Toronto Raptors
- Utah Jazz
- Washington Wizards

==== Day 1 ====
Note: Times are EDT (UTC−4) as listed by the NBA.

ESPN3

August 8
4:00 pm

Boxscore

Boston Celtics 85, Atlanta Hawks 83
Scoring by quarter: 17–16, 25–25, 19–20, 24–22
| Pts: Pritchard 23; Rebs: Edwards 8 Asts: Edwards 6 | Pts: Johnson 20; Rebs: Johnson 10; Asts: Cooper 6 |

Cox Pavilion, Las Vegas, Nevada
Attendance: 0
Referees: Karleena Tobin, Robert Hussey, Kaitlynn Bunger

ESPN2

August 8
4:30 pm

Boxscore

Toronto Raptors 89, New York Knicks 79
Scoring by quarter: 17–16, 22–21, 21–16, 29–26
| Pts: Flynn 23; Rebs: Gillespie 13; Asts: Barnes 5 | Pts: Toppin 24; Rebs: Toppin 8 Asts: Quickley 8 |

Thomas and Mack Center, Las Vegas, Nevada
Attendance: 0
Referees: John Conley, Kelly Broomfield, Klajdi Mulla, Josh Reed

ESPN3

August 8
6:00 pm

Boxscore

Portland Trail Blazers 93, Charlotte Hornets 86
Scoring by quarter: 21–17, 21–17, 18–23, 33–29
| Pts: Blakeney 27; Rebs: Faried 8 Asts: Mudiay 9 | Pts: Bouknight 19; Rebs: Jones 10; Asts: Riller 6 |

Cox Pavilion, Las Vegas, Nevada
Attendance: 0
Referees: Dannica Mosher, Intae Hwang, Jenna Reneau

ESPN2

August 8
6:30 pm

Boxscore

Houston Rockets 84, Cleveland Cavaliers 76
Scoring by quarter: 20–23, 20–18, 23–20, 21–15
| Pts: Green 23; Rebs: Şengün 15; Asts: Christopher 4 | Pts: Okoro 17; Rebs: Mfiondu Kabengele 13; Asts: Hands 3 |

Thomas and Mack Center, Las Vegas, Nevada
Attendance: 0
Referees: Isaac Barnett, Clare Aubry, Josh Reed

NBATV

August 8
8:00 pm

Boxscore

Washington Wizards vs. Indiana Pacers
Game postponed

Cox Pavilion, Las Vegas, Nevada
Attendance: 0
Referees: Dannica Mosher, Intae Hwang, Jenna Reneau

ESPN2

August 8
8:30 pm

Boxscore

Oklahoma City Thunder 76, Detroit Pistons 72
Scoring by quarter: 14–26, 28–12, 25–19, 9–15
| Pts: Maledon 15; Rebs: Hoard 10; Asts: Maledon 11 | Pts: Bey 14; Rebs: Bey 12; Asts: Hayes 5 |

Thomas and Mack Center, Las Vegas, Nevada
Attendance: 0
Referees: Kevin Fahy, Danielle Scott, Chastity Taylor

ESPN3

August 8
10:00 pm

Boxscore

Denver Nuggets 77, Miami Heat 97
Scoring by quarter: 12–30, 20–21, 17–22, 28–24
| Pts: Agada 21; Rebs: Hamilton 11; Asts: Agada 5 | Pts: Nembhard 18; Rebs: Okpala 11; Asts: Jarreau 4 |

Cox Pavilion, Las Vegas, Nevada
Attendance: 0
Referees: Ashley Gloss, Nate Anderson, Nate Cearly, Cheryl Flores, Chance Moore, Grant Detrick

ESPN2

August 8
10:30 pm

Boxscore

Los Angeles Lakers 73, Phoenix Suns 72
Scoring by quarter: 14–12, 16–16, 19–28, 24–16
| Pts: Cacok 13; Rebs: Cacok 7 Asts: Simpson 5 | Pts: Smith 15; Rebs: Smith 12; Asts: Smith 3 |

Thomas and Mack Center, Las Vegas, Nevada
Attendance: 0
Referees: Randy Richardson, J.D. Ralls, Devorah Robinson-Ashe

==== Day 2 ====
ESPN3

August 9
2:00 pm

Boxscore

New York Knicks 94, Indiana Pacers 86
Scoring by quarter: 18–24, 23–20, 26–18, 27–24
| Pts: Quickley 32; Rebs: Obi Toppin 9 Asts: Quickley 8 | Pts: Washington Jr. 23; Rebs: Brissett 7 Asts: Brissett 3 |

Thomas and Mack Center, Las Vegas, Nevada
Attendance: 0
Referees: Jenna Reneau, Ken Jones, Grant Detrick

ESPN2

August 9
3:00 pm

Boxscore

New Orleans Pelicans 94, Chicago Bulls 77
Scoring by quarter: 23–26, 21–21, 25–19, 25–11
| Pts: Murphy 26; Rebs: Murphy 9 Asts: Lewis Jr. 7 | Pts: Dotson 16; Rebs: Williams 12; Asts: Dotson 4 |

Cox Pavilion, Las Vegas, Nevada
Attendance: 0
Referees: Tyler Ricks, Angel Kent, Ian McClenny

ESPN3

August 9
4:00 pm

Boxscore

Dallas Mavericks 73, Philadelphia 76ers 95
Scoring by quarter: 14–31, 17–26, 17–20, 25–18
| Pts: Terry 22; Rebs: Figueroa 9 Asts: Hinton 6 | Pts: Maxey 21; Rebs: Reed 8 Asts: Maxey 4 |

Thomas and Mack Center, Las Vegas, Nevada
Attendance: 0
Referees: Ryan Sassano, Demoya Williams, Mike Wallace

ESPN2

August 9
5:00 pm

Boxscore

Brooklyn Nets 84, Memphis Grizzlies 91
Scoring by quarter: 16–15, 17–28, 26–18, 25–30
| Pts: Thomas 19; Rebs: Perry 12; Asts: Weatherspoon 4 | Pts: Bane 32; Rebs: Konchar 13; Asts: Tillman 7 |

Cox Pavilion, Las Vegas, Nevada
Attendance: 0
Referees: Brent Haskill, Toni Patillo, Catherine Chang

ESPN3

August 9
6:00 pm

Boxscore

Charlotte Hornets 70, Sacramento Kings 80
Scoring by quarter: 13–16, 14–15, 21–24, 22–25
| Pts: Carton 13; Rebs: Jones 7 Asts: Jones 4 | Pts: Ramsey 22; Rebs: Queta 6 Asts: Mitchell 9 |

Thomas and Mack Center, Las Vegas, Nevada
Attendance: 0
Referees: Kristyne Esparza, Blanca Burns, Cameron Gelinas

ESPNU

August 9
7:00 pm

Boxscore

San Antonio Spurs 89, Minnesota Timberwolves 91
Scoring by quarter: 20–22, 18–27, 26–18, 25–24
| Pts: Vassell 23; Rebs: Renfro 6 Asts: Jones 8 | Pts: Nowell 24; Rebs: Knight 9 Asts: Nowell 4 |

Cox Pavilion, Las Vegas, Nevada
Attendance: 0
Referees: Biniam Maru, Sha'Rae Mitchell, Jason Alabanza

ESPN3

August 9
8:00 pm

Boxscore

Orlando Magic 91, Golden State Warriors 89 (OT)
Scoring by quarter: 20–18, 19–22, 20–27, 24–16, Overtime: 8–6
| Pts: Suggs 24; Rebs: Suggs 9 Asts: Hampton 3 | Pts: Kuminga 16; Rebs: Payton II 8 Asts: McLaughlin 4 |

Thomas and Mack Center, Las Vegas, Nevada
Attendance: 0
Referees: Dan Powers, Agon Abazi, Angelica Suffren

ESPNU

August 9
9:00 pm

Boxscore

Los Angeles Clippers 78, Milwaukee Bucks 81
Scoring by quarter: 17–19, 13–27, 23–16, 25–19
| Pts: Scrubb 24; Rebs: Scrubb 10; Asts: Preston 8 | Pts: Nwora 30; Rebs: Mamukelashvili 12; Asts: Nwora 6 |

Cox Pavilion, Las Vegas, Nevada
Attendance: 0
Referees: Kevin Fahy, Tyler Mirkovich, Chelisa Painter

ESPN3

August 9
10:00 pm

Boxscore

Phoenix Suns 57, Utah Jazz 63
Scoring by quarter: 11–11, 16–25, 12–12, 18–15
| Pts: Alexander 16; Rebs: Smith 15; Asts: Simon 2 | Pts: Forrest 10; Rebs: Azubuike 8 Asts: Forrest 7 |

Thomas and Mack Center, Las Vegas, Nevada
Attendance: 0
Referees: Brandon Schwab, Pat O'Connell, Kaitlynn Bunger

Day 3

ESPN3

August 10
6:00 pm

Boxscore

Atlanta Hawks 84, Indiana Pacers 83
Scoring by quarter: 19–21, 26–16, 24–26, 15–20
| Pts: Cooper 21; Rebs: Johnson 10; Asts: Cooper 9 | Pts: Duarte 21; Rebs: Jackson 12; Asts: Brissett 3 |

Cox Pavilion, Las Vegas, Nevada
Attendance: 0
Referees: Cheryl Flores, Chance Moore, Ken Jones

ESPNU

August 10
7:00 pm

Boxscore

Boston Celtics 107, Denver Nuggets 82
Scoring by quarter: 31–23, 35–23, 24–22, 17–14
| Pts: Nesmith 33; Rebs: Pritchard 8 Asts: Pritchard 12 | Pts: Bol 26; Rebs: Bol 9 Asts: Hyland 7 |

Thomas and Mack Center, Las Vegas, Nevada
Attendance: 0
Referees: Robert Hussey, Paul Tuomey, Lauren Niemiera

ESPN3

August 10
8:00 pm

Boxscore

Chicago Bulls 92, San Antonio Spurs 89
Scoring by quarter: 14–26, 23–26, 29–17, 26–20
| Pts: Williams 30; Rebs: Williams 7 Asts: Dotson 5 | Pts: Jones 23; Rebs: Renfro 8 Asts: Newman 4 |

Cox Pavilion, Las Vegas, Nevada
Attendance: 0
Referees: Dannica Mosher, Nate Anderson, Matt Rafferty

ESPN

August 10
9:00 pm

Boxscore

Detroit Pistons 91, Houston Rockets 111
Scoring by quarter: 28–24, 15–30, 28–29, 20–28
| Pts: Cunningham 20; Rebs: Bey 7 Asts: Bey 4 | Pts: Green 25; Rebs: Sengun 8 Asts: Christopher 7 |

Thomas and Mack Center, Las Vegas, Nevada
Attendance: 0
Referees: Charles Watson, John Conley, Kelsey Reynolds

NBA TV

August 10
10:00 pm

Boxscore

Sacramento Kings 89, Washington Wizards 75
Scoring by quarter: 21–21, 23–18, 29–20, 16–16
| Pts: King 16; Rebs: Terry 10; Asts: Metu 4 | Pts: Homesley 17; Rebs: Goodwin 8 Asts: Jones 4 |

Cox Pavilion, Las Vegas, Nevada
Attendance: 0
Referees: Karleena Tobin, Isaac Barnett, Teresa Stuck

ESPNU

August 10
11:00 pm

Boxscore

Los Angeles Clippers 66, Portland Trail Blazers 86
Scoring by quarter: 20–22, 16–17, 15–25, 15–22
| Pts: Scrubb 15; Rebs: Oturu 13; Asts: Johnson 6 | Pts: Simmons 15; Rebs: Faried 12; Asts: Watford 5 |

Thomas and Mack Center, Las Vegas, Nevada
Attendance: 0
Referees: Ashley Gloss, Randy Richardson, Intae Hwang
