= 2017–18 Charleston Cougars men's basketball team =

American college basketball season

2017–18 Charleston Cougars men's basketball

CAA regular-season co-champions and tournament champions

NCAA tournament, first round
- Conference: Colonial Athletic Association
- Record: 26–8 (14–4 CAA)
- Head coach: Earl Grant (4th season)
- Assistant coaches: Milan Brown; J.D. Powell; Quinton Ferrell
- Home arena: TD Arena

2017–18 CAA men's basketball standings
	Conf.				Overall
Team	W		L	PCT	W		L	PCT
College of Charleston †	14	–	4	.778	26	–	8	.765
Northeastern	14	–	4	.778	23	–	10	.697
Hofstra	12	–	6	.667	19	–	12	.613
William & Mary	11	–	7	.611	19	–	12	.613
Towson	8	–	10	.444	18	–	14	.563
UNC Wilmington	7	–	11	.389	11	–	21	.344
Delaware	6	–	12	.333	14	–	19	.424
Drexel	6	–	12	.333	13	–	20	.394
James Madison	6	–	12	.333	10	–	22	.313
Elon	6	–	12	.333	14	–	18	.438
† 2018 CAA tournament winner

The 2017–18 Charleston Cougars men's basketball team represented the College of Charleston during the 2017–18 NCAA Division I men's basketball season. The Cougars, led by fourth-year head coach Earl Grant, played their home games at the TD Arena in Charleston, South Carolina as members of the Colonial Athletic Association (CAA). They finished the season 26–8, 14–4 in CAA play, to share the regular season title with Northeastern. At the CAA tournament they defeated Drexel, William & Mary and Northeastern to become CAA tournament champions. They earned the CAA's automatic bid to the NCAA tournament where they lost in the first round to Auburn.

== Previous season ==
The Cougars finished the 2016–17 season 25–10, 14–4 in CAA play, to finish in second place. In the CAA tournament, they defeated James Madison in the quarterfinals and Towson in the semifinals, before losing to UNC Wilmington in the championship game. They were then invited to participate in the NIT, where they lost to Colorado State in the first round.

== Offseason ==
=== Departures ===
Name	Number	Pos.	Height	Weight	Year	Hometown	Notes
Chevez Goodwin	0	F	6'9"	205	Freshman	Columbia, SC	Transferred to Wofford
Payton Hulsey	3	G	6'5"	215	Senior	Memphis, TN	Graduated and transferred to FAU
Terrance O'Donohue	15	F	6'7"	225	Senior	Norcross, GA	Graduated

=== 2017 recruiting class ===
College recruiting information
Name	Hometown	School	Height	Weight	Commit date
Samba Ndiaye; C	Thiès, Senegal	Sunrise Christian Academy (KS)	6 ft 10 in (2.08 m)	230 lb (100 kg)	
Samba Ndiaye; C	Recruit ratings: No ratings found				
Overall recruit ranking:
Note: In many cases, Scout, Rivals, 247Sports, On3, and ESPN may conflict in their listings of height and weight.; In these cases, the average was taken. ESPN grades are on a 100-point scale.; Sources: "2017 Team Ranking". Rivals.

== Preseason ==
In a poll of league coaches, media relations directors, and media members at the CAA's media day, the Cougars were picked to finish atop the CAA. Junior forward Jarrell Brantley and senior guard Joe Chealey were named to the preseason All-CAA first team, while sophomore guard Grant Riller was named to the preseason All-CAA second team.

== Roster ==
2017–18 College of Charleston Cougars men's basketball team
Players
Coaches

Pos.	#	Name	Height	Weight	Year	Previous school	Hometown
G	1	Grant Riller	6 ft 3 in (1.91 m)	195 lb (88 kg)	RS So	Ocoee HS	Ocoee, FL
G	2	Brevin Galloway	6 ft 2 in (1.88 m)	215 lb (98 kg)	RS Fr	Seneca Senior HS	Anderson, SC
G	4	John Eck (W)	6 ft 4 in (1.93 m)	170 lb (77 kg)	Sr	Hilton Head Prep	Hilton Head Island, SC
F	5	Jarrell Brantley	6 ft 7 in (2.01 m)	250 lb (113 kg)	Jr	Notre Dame Prep (MA)	Columbia, SC
F	11	Evan Bailey	6 ft 6 in (1.98 m)	210 lb (95 kg)	Sr	Jackson HS (Stark Co., OH)	Canton, OH
G	12	Cameron Johnson	6 ft 4 in (1.93 m)	200 lb (91 kg)	Sr	Clarke Central HS	Athens, GA
G	13	Joe Chealey	6 ft 4 in (1.93 m)	190 lb (86 kg)	Sr	Apopka HS	Orlando, FL
G	15	Trent Robinson (W)	5 ft 11 in (1.8 m)	180 lb (82 kg)	Jr	Ridge View HS	Columbia, SC
G	21	Marquise Pointer	6 ft 0 in (1.83 m)	220 lb (100 kg)	Jr	Jonesboro HS (AR)	Jonesboro, AR
F	22	Jermaine Jr. Blackmon	6 ft 2 in (1.88 m)	230 lb (104 kg)	Jr	Davidson Day School	Charlotte, NC
F	23	Nick Harris	6 ft 10 in (2.08 m)	260 lb (118 kg)	Jr	St. Pius X Catholic HS	Dacula, GA
F	24	Jaylen McManus	6 ft 7 in (2.01 m)	230 lb (104 kg)	So	North Mecklenburg HS	Charlotte, NC
F/C	33	Osinachi Smart	6 ft 8 in (2.03 m)	235 lb (107 kg)	RS Fr	New Garden Friends School	Umuahia, Nigeria
C	40	Samba Ndiaye	6 ft 10 in (2.08 m)	230 lb (104 kg)	Fr	Sunrise Christian Academy (KS)	Thiès, Senegal

Head coach

- Earl Grant (Georgia College)

Assistant coach(es)

- Milan Brown (Howard)
- J.D. Powell (Clemson)
- Quinton Ferrell (Presbyterian)

Legend

- (C) Team captain
- (S) Suspended
- (I) Ineligible
- (W) Walk-on
- Injured
- Current redshirt

Roster
Last update: July 19, 2024

== Schedule and results ==
Date time, TV	Rank^{#}	Opponent^{#}	Result	Record	High points	High rebounds	High assists	Site (attendance) city, state
Exhibition
November 2, 2017*; 7:00 p.m.		Bob Jones	W 77–44		16 – Brantley	8 – Brantley	5 – Pointer	TD Arena (2,728); Charleston, SC
Non-conference regular season
November 10, 2017*; 7:00 p.m.		Siena	W 68–60 ^{OT}	1–0	21 – Riller	9 – Harris	3 – Riller	TD Arena (4,955); Charleston, SC
November 13, 2017*; 9:00 p.m., CBSSN		at No. 6 Wichita State	L 63–81	1–1	20 – Riller	6 – Harris	2 – Pointer	Charles Koch Arena (10,506); Wichita, KS
November 18, 2017*; 7:00 p.m.		at Charlotte	W 81–72	2–1	29 – Chealey	7 – tied	2 – tied	Dale F. Halton Arena (4,122); Charlotte, NC
November 22, 2017*; 4:00 p.m.		vs. Cal Poly; Great Alaska Shootout quarterfinals	L 68–73	2–2	26 – Chealey	6 – Chealey	10 – Chealey	Alaska Airlines Center (1,524); Anchorage, AK
November 23, 2017*; 9:30 p.m.		vs. Sam Houston State; Great Alaska Shootout consolation 2nd round	W 59–49	3–2	13 – Chealey	8 – Harris	8 – Chealey	Alaska Airlines Center (1,646); Anchorage, AK
November 22, 2017*; 6:30 p.m.		at Alaska Anchorage; Great Alaska Shootout 5th-place game	W 55–46	4–2	15 – Chealey	7 – Harris	8 – Chealey	Alaska Airlines Center (2,229); Anchorage, AK
November 30, 2017*; 7:00 p.m.		Western Carolina	W 69–60	5–2	18 – Chealey	10 – Smart	7 – Chealey	TD Arena (3,889); Charleston, SC
December 4, 2017*; 7:00 p.m.		High Point	W 70–58	6–2	17 – Chealey	9 – Harris	4 – Johnson	TD Arena (3,223); Charleston, SC
December 10, 2017*; 2:00 p.m.		North Greenville	W 92–60	7–2	20 – Chealey	12 – Harris	5 – tied	TD Arena (3,227); Charleston, SC
December 16, 2017*; 4:00 p.m.		at Rhode Island	L 62–68	7–3	21 – Riller	8 – Chealey	5 – Chealey	Ryan Center (5,761); Kingston, RI
December 19, 2017*; 7:00 p.m.		South Carolina State	W 80–64	8–3	31 – Riller	10 – Harris	6 – Chealey	TD Arena (3,195); Charleston, SC
December 22, 2017*; 7:00 p.m.		at Coastal Carolina	W 67–65	9–3	24 – Riller	9 – Harris	2 – 3 tied	HTC Center (1,239); Conway, SC
CAA regular season
December 30, 2017; 4:00 p.m.		Towson	W 73–62	10–3 (1–0)	24 – Brantley	7 – Chealey	4 – tied	TD Arena (4,343); Charleston, SC
January 2, 2018; 7:00 p.m.		Delaware	W 93–78	11–3 (2–0)	29 – Chealey	6 – Brantley	4 – Chealey	TD Arena (2,894); Charleston, SC
January 5, 2018; 7:00 p.m.		at Drexel	L 82–87 ^{OT}	11–4 (2–1)	22 – Chealey	10 – Brantley	3 – Brantley	Daskalakis Athletic Center (704); Philadelphia, PA
January 7, 2018; 2:00 p.m.		at Towson	L 62–73	11–5 (2–2)	18 – Riller	7 – Brantley	5 – Chealey	SECU Arena (1,410); Towson, MD
January 11, 2018; 7:00 p.m.		Northeastern	W 82–66	12–5 (3–2)	22 – Brantley	6 – Brantley	3 – Johnson	TD Arena (3,705); Charleston, SC
January 13, 2018; 4:00 p.m.		at Elon	L 58–63	12–6 (3–3)	16 – Brantley	10 – Harris	3 – Riller	Alumni Gym (1,855); Elon, NC
January 18, 2018; 7:00 p.m.		UNC Wilmington	W 80–76	13–6 (4–3)	18 – Chealey	8 – Harris	4 – Chealey	TD Arena (3,649); Charleston, SC
January 20, 2018; 4:00 p.m.		Hofstra	W 76–70	14–6 (5–3)	33 – Chealey	11 – Harris	2 – Pointer	TD Arena (4,045); Charleston, SC
January 25, 2018; 7:00 p.m.		at Delaware	W 62–54	15–6 (6–3)	23 – Chealey	12 – Brantley	4 – Riller	Bob Carpenter Center (2,350); Newark, DE
January 27, 2018; 3:00 p.m.		James Madison	W 66–59	16–6 (7–3)	21 – Brantley	8 – tied	4 – Riller	TD Arena (4,030); Charleston, SC
February 1, 2018; 7:00 p.m.		at Northeastern	W 69–64	17–6 (8–3)	23 – Chealey	10 – Harris	3 – Johnson	Matthews Arena (1,106); Boston, MA
February 3, 2018; 7:00 p.m.		at Hofstra	W 86–85	18–6 (9–3)	24 – Riller	7 – Brantley	7 – Johnson	Mack Sports Complex (2,508); Hempstead, NY
February 8, 2018; 7:00 p.m.		William & Mary	W 82–77	19–6 (10–3)	37 – Riller	4 – 3 tied	2 – tied	TD Arena (3,857); Charleston, SC
February 10, 2018; 4:00 p.m.		Drexel	W 89–67	20–6 (11–3)	30 – Brantley	6 – tied	6 – Chealey	TD Arena (4,219); Charleston, SC
February 15, 2018; 7:00 p.m.		at James Madison	W 81–78 ^{OT}	21–6 (12–3)	32 – Riller	13 – Brantley	7 – Brantley	JMU Convocation Center (2,454); Harrisonburg, VA
February 17, 2018; 7:00 p.m.		UNC Wilmington	W 88–74	22–6 (13–3)	28 – Riller	7 – Brantley	3 – tied	TD Arena (4,809); Charleston, SC
February 22, 2018; 7:00 p.m.		Elon	W 79–58	23–6 (14–3)	30 – Riller	7 – Chealey	4 – tied	TD Arena (4,745); Charleston, SC
February 24, 2018; 4:00 p.m.		at William & Mary	L 104–114 ^{OT}	23–7 (14–4)	29 – Riller	12 – Brantley	5 – Chealey	Kaplan Arena (3,649); Williamsburg, VA
CAA tournament
March 4, 2018; 12:00 p.m., CAA.tv	(1)	vs. (8) Drexel; Quarterfinals	W 66–59	24–7	22 – Chealey	11 – Brantley	3 – tied	North Charleston Coliseum (4,672); North Charleston, SC
March 5, 2018; 5:00 p.m., CBSSN	(1)	vs. (4) William & Mary; Semifinals	W 83–73	25–7	25 – Riller	10 – Brantley	5 – Pointer	North Charleston Coliseum (4,099); North Charleston, SC
March 6, 2018; 6:00 p.m., CBSSN	(1)	vs. (2) Northeastern; Championship	W 83–76 ^{OT}	26–7	32 – Chealey	11 – Brantley	3 – Chealey	North Charleston Coliseum (7,945); North Charleston, SC
NCAA tournament
March 16, 2018*; 7:27 p.m., truTV	(13 MW)	vs. (4 MW) No. 19 Auburn; First Round	L 58–62	26–8	24 – Brantley	7 – tied	3 – Pointer	Viejas Arena (10,092); San Diego, CA
*Non-conference game. ^{#}Rankings from AP. (#) Tournament seedings in parentheses. MW=Midwest. All times are in Eastern.

== Awards and honors ==
=== CAA Conference Honors ===
==== First Team All-CAA ====
- Joe Chealey
- Grant Riller

==== Second Team All-CAA ====
- Jarrell Brantley

==== CAA All-Defensive Team ====
- Cameron Johnson

=== CAA Tournament honors ===
==== All-Tournament Team ====
- Jarrell Brantley
- Joe Chealey

==== Most Outstanding Player ====
- Grant Riller

== See also ==
- 2017–18 Charleston Cougars women's basketball team
