= 1926 Southern Intercollegiate Athletic Association men's basketball tournament =

- Classification: Division I
- Teams: 12
- Site: Greenville, SC
- Champions: Mississippi College Choctaws (1st title)
- Winning coach: George Bohler (1st title)
- Southern Intercollegiate Athletic Association men's basketball tournaments

The 1926 SIAA men's basketball tournament took place March 3–March 6, 1927, at Greenville. The Mississippi College Choctaws won their first Southern Intercollegiate Athletic Association title, led by head coach George Bohler.

== Bracket ==
First round March 3
The Citadel
Bye
Newberry	34
Stetson	21
Furman
Bye
Wofford	19
Howard	26
Mercer
Bye
Chattanooga	20
Charleston	38
Kentucky Wesleyan
Bye
Mississippi College	41
Presbyterian	19

Quarterfinals; March 4
The Citadel	37
Newberry	19
Furman	17
Howard	15
Mercer	37
Charleston	23
Kentucky Wesleyan	26
Mississippi College	36

Semifinals; March 5
The Citadel	36
Furman	26
Mercer	22
Mississippi College	39

Finals; March 6
The Citadel	23
Mississippi College	41

=== Consolation game ===
March 6

Furman 25, Mercer 37

Greenville, SC

=== Championship ===
March 6

The Citadel 23, Mississippi College 41

Greenville, SC

== See also ==
- List of SIAA basketball champions
