= Jody Lumpkin =

American basketball player (born 1978)

Personal information
- Born: August 13, 1978 (age 48) Columbia, South Carolina, U.S.
- Listed height: 6 ft 8 in (2.03 m)
- Listed weight: 250 lb (113 kg)

Career information
- High school: Hammond School (Columbia, South Carolina)
- College: Rice (1996–1997); College of Charleston (1998–2001)
- NBA draft: 2001: undrafted
- Playing career: 2001–2004
- Position: Center

Career history
- 2001–2002: Leuven
- 2002–2003: Liège
- 2003–2004: Aix Maurienne

Career highlights
- Honorable Mention All-American (2001); SoCon Player of the Year (2001); First-team All-SoCon (2001)

Jody Lumpkin (born August 13, 1978) is an American former professional basketball player who is better known for his collegiate career at the College of Charleston between 1998–99 and 2000–01. In 2016, he was a schoolteacher, and coached high school basketball in his hometown of Columbia, South Carolina. As of 2026 he is a principal in Hickory, North Carolina.

== Playing career ==
=== High school ===
When Jody Lumpkin graduated from Hammond School in 1996, he chose to play at Rice University over his other top candidates Davidson College, the University of Pennsylvania, the College of Charleston (CofC), and the University of Maryland. He had averaged 20 points and 12 rebounds per game in his junior year of high school prior to committing early to Rice in October 1995.

=== College ===
In 1996–97, Lumpkin's freshman year playing for the Owls, he appeared in 26 games and averaged 4.7 points and 3.3 rebounds per game. The 6'8" center decided it was in his best interests to transfer, and at the end of the season he let the NCAA know he would be transferring to the College of Charleston. Due to NCAA by-laws, Lumpkin had to redshirt the 1997–98 season. When he became eligible in 1998–99, Lumpkin made an immediate impact for the Cougars: he averaged 10.4 points and 6.8 rebounds as CofC went undefeated in Southern Conference games en route to regular season and SoCon tournament championships. They earned a berth into the NCAA tournament but lost to Tulsa in the round of 64.

The Cougars won two more conference regular season championships in Lumpkin's final two collegiate seasons, but because they failed to win the SoCon Tournament either time, they did not earn bids to any postseason tournaments. Lumpkin increased his scoring averages in each of those seasons. In 2000–01, after averaging 17.1 points and 7.9 rebounds per game while leading the Cougars to a 22–7 overall record, Lumpkin was named the SoCon Player of the Year, joining Sedric Webber as the only two CofC players at that point to earn the honor in the Southern Conference. He scored over 1,300 points and grabbed over 700 rebounds for his cumulative four-year career at both Rice and CofC.

=== Professional ===
Lumpkin went undrafted in the 2001 NBA draft, so he took his professional career abroad. He only played three total seasons – the first two in Belgium for the Leuven Bears and Liège Basket, then the final year for Aix Maurienne Savoie Basket in France. Lumpkin found that playing professionally in Europe was not what he looked for from the sport. In a 2007 interview, he said "[T]he basketball over there was a bit of a letdown after playing at the College of Charleston. It was very much like punching a time clock. With player turnover and coaching turnovers, it was a lot like a job. I had six coaches in three years."

== Post basketball life ==
In 2004, Lumpkin and his wife, Maggie, moved back to Columbia, South Carolina. He became a schoolteacher at Hammond School teaching calculus. He also became an assistant boys' basketball coach. Later he went on to become the Upper School Head of Hammond School.
