= 1998 TAAC men's basketball tournament =

- Classification: Division I
- Season: 1997–98
- Teams: 8
- Site: John Kresse Arena; Charleston, SC
- Champions: College of Charleston (2nd title)
- Winning coach: John Kresse (2nd title)
- MVP: Sedric Webber (College of Charleston)
- TAAC men's basketball tournaments

1997–98 Trans America Athletic Conference men's basketball standings
	Conf.				Overall
Team	W		L	PCT	W		L	PCT
East
College of Charleston †	14	–	2	.875	24	–	6	.800
Florida International	13	–	3	.813	21	–	8	.724
Central Florida	11	–	5	.688	17	–	11	.607
Stetson	8	–	8	.500	11	–	15	.423
Florida Atlantic	5	–	11	.313	5	–	22	.185
Campbell	4	–	12	.250	10	–	17	.370
West
Georgia State	11	–	5	.688	16	–	12	.571
Samford	9	–	7	.563	14	–	13	.519
Centenary	8	–	8	.500	10	–	20	.333
Jacksonville State	6	–	10	.375	12	–	14	.462
Troy	5	–	11	.313	7	–	20	.259
Mercer	2	–	14	.125	5	–	21	.192
† 1998 TAAC tournament winner Rankings from AP poll

The 1998 Trans America Athletic Conference men's basketball tournament (now known as the ASUN men's basketball tournament) was held February 26–28 at the John Kresse Arena at the College of Charleston in Charleston, South Carolina.

In a rematch of the 1997 title match, College of Charleston again defeated Florida International in the championship game, 72–63, to win their second TAAC/Atlantic Sun men's basketball tournament.

The Cougars, therefore, received the TAAC's automatic bid to the 1998 NCAA tournament.

== Format ==
For conference scheduling, the 12 teams in the TAAC were separated into two six-team divisions. However, only the top eight teams in the standings, regardless of division, were invited to participate in the tournament. However, transitioning members Florida Atlantic, Jacksonville State, and Troy State were not eligible.

Southeastern Louisiana departed the TAAC for the Southland Conference prior to the season but were replaced by Troy State, leaving total membership at 12.

== Bracket ==
Quarterfinals; Thursday, February 26
1	College of Charleston	78
8	Campbell	64
5	Central Florida	94
4	Samford	70
3	Georgia State	80
6	Stetson	59
7	Centenary (LA)	74
2	Florida International	101

Semifinals; Friday, February 27
1	College of Charleston	81
5	Central Florida	66
3	Georgia State	80
2	Florida International	82

Championship; Saturday, February 28
1	College of Charleston	72
2	Florida International	63
