= Jarrell Brantley =

American basketball player (born 1996)

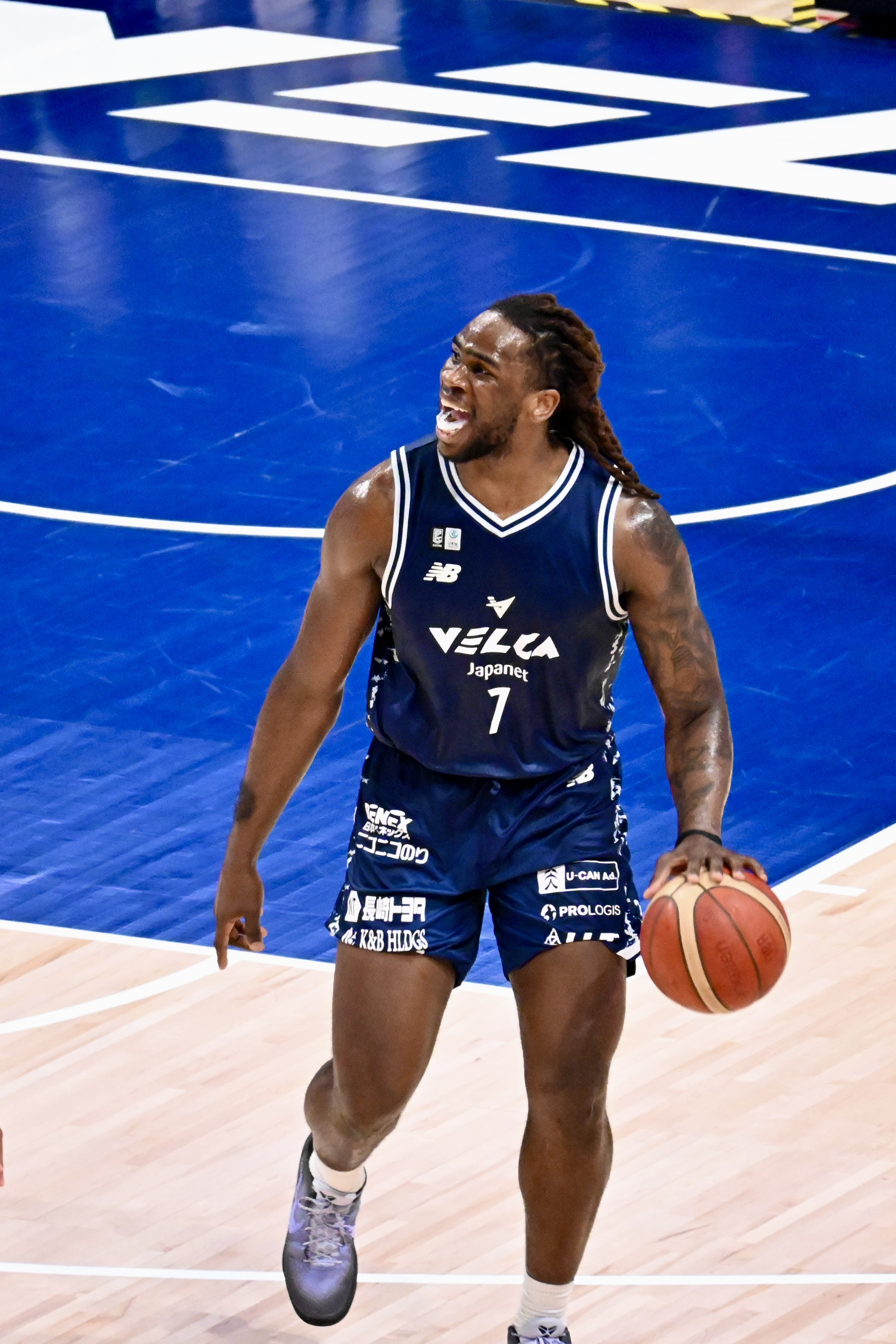
- Brantley in 2025

No. 7 – Nagasaki Velca
- Position: Power forward / small forward
- League: B.League

Personal information
- Born: June 7, 1996 (age 30) Charleston, South Carolina, U.S.
- Listed height: 6 ft 5 in (1.96 m)
- Listed weight: 250 lb (113 kg)

Career information
- High school: Ridge View (Columbia, South Carolina); Montrose Christian School (Rockville, Maryland)
- College: College of Charleston (2015–2019)
- NBA draft: 2019: 2nd round, 50th overall pick
- Drafted by: Indiana Pacers
- Playing career: 2019–present

Career history
- 2019–2021: Utah Jazz
- 2019–2021: →Salt Lake City Stars
- 2021–2022: UNICS
- 2022: Greensboro Swarm
- 2022: Leones de Ponce
- 2022–2023: New Zealand Breakers
- 2023: Utah Jazz
- 2023–present: Nagasaki Velca

Career highlights
- All-NBA G League First Team (2020); NBA G League All-Rookie Team (2020); First-team All-CAA (2019); 2× Second-team All-CAA (2017, 2018); Third-team All-CAA (2016); CAA All-Defensive Team (2017); CAA Rookie of the Year (2016)
- Stats at NBA.com
- Stats at Basketball Reference

Jarrell Isaiah Brantley (born June 7, 1996) is an American professional basketball player for Nagasaki Velca of the B.League. He played college basketball for the College of Charleston Cougars.

== College career ==
As a junior, Brantley averaged 17.3 points and 6.6 rebounds per game and was named to the Second Team All-Colonial Athletic Association. He averaged 19 points and 8.4 rebounds per game as a senior, while averaging 1.2 three-pointers per game on a 32.8 percent three-point field goal percentage. He was named to the First Team All-Colonial Athletic Association. Brantley finished his career with 1,914 points, which is the third highest in the team's history.

== Professional career ==
=== Utah Jazz (2019–2021) ===
Brantley worked out for several NBA teams after his college season ended, including the Boston Celtics, Brooklyn Nets, Charlotte Hornets, Los Angeles Clippers, Minnesota Timberwolves, and Phoenix Suns.

Brantley was selected by the Indiana Pacers in the second round of the 2019 NBA draft with the 50th overall pick before being traded to the Utah Jazz.

On July 16, 2019, Brantley was signed to a two-way contract by the Jazz. On October 25, 2019, Brantley made his debut in NBA, coming off from bench in an 86–95 loss to the Los Angeles Lakers with three rebounds, an assist and a block. On January 15, 2020, Brantley tallied 28 points, eight rebounds and five assists for the Salt Lake City Stars in a loss to the Maine Red Claws. On February 11, Brantley flirted with a triple double, contributing 26 points, 14 rebounds and eight assists in a 112–108 overtime win over the Texas Legends.

On April 13, 2021, Brantley played 22 minutes for the Jazz in a 106–96 victory over the Oklahoma City Thunder. He scored 10 points off the bench including 2 for 3 from 3-point range, with 4 rebounds and 1 assist. He also proved the most effective defender against Thunder guard-forward Luguentz Dort.

On September 15, 2021, with request from Brantley, he was waived by the Jazz.

=== UNICS (2021–2022) ===
On September 20, 2021, Brantley signed with UNICS Kazan of the VTB United League.

Brantley left the team in early 2022 due to the 2022 Russian invasion of Ukraine. The team sued him for $250,000 and tried to prevent him from signing with an NBA G League team.

=== Greensboro Swarm (2022) ===
On March 11, 2022, Brantley was acquired via waivers by the Greensboro Swarm, playing 10 games and averaging 10.2 points, 5.6 rebounds, 2.5 assists and 1.4 steals.

=== Leones de Ponce (2022) ===
On April 5, 2022, Brantley signed with Leones de Ponce of the BSN.

Brantley joined the Los Angeles Clippers for the 2022 NBA Summer League.

=== New Zealand Breakers (2022–2023) ===
On July 27, 2022, Brantley signed with the New Zealand Breakers for the 2022–23 NBL season. He and his brother Jamaal became the first duo of import brothers to play together in an NBL game. He was named the Breakers' Club MVP.

=== Return to Utah (2023) ===
On March 18, 2023, Brantley signed a 10-day contract with the Utah Jazz, returning to the franchise for a second stint. He appeared in four NBA games for the Jazz.

=== Nagasaki Velca (2023–present) ===
On August 1, 2023, Brantley signed with Nagasaki Velca of the B.League.

== Career statistics ==
Legend
GP	Games played	GS	Games started	MPG	Minutes per game
FG%	Field goal percentage	3P%	3-point field goal percentage	FT%	Free throw percentage
RPG	Rebounds per game	APG	Assists per game	SPG	Steals per game
BPG	Blocks per game	PPG	Points per game	**Bold**	Career high

=== NBA ===
==== Regular season ====
Year	Team	GP	GS	MPG	FG%	3P%	FT%	RPG	APG	SPG	BPG	PPG
2019–20	Utah	9	0	**10.7**	.357	.231	.500	**2.2**	**1.2**	**.3**	**.6**	2.7
2020–21	Utah	**28**	0	4.9	.481	.429	**1.000**	1.0	.5	**.3**	.1	2.3
2022–23	Utah	4	0	9.8	**.571**	**.444**	**1.000**	1.5	.8	.0	.5	**5.5**
Career		41	0	6.7	.457	.380	.833	1.3	.7	.2	.2	2.7

==== Playoffs ====
Year	Team	GP	GS	MPG	FG%	3P%	FT%	RPG	APG	SPG	BPG	PPG
2020	Utah	**2**	0	**6.5**	.000	.000	**.500**	**2.0**	**1.0**	.0	**.5**	**.5**
2021	Utah	**2**	0	1.5	.000	—	**.500**	.5	.0	.0	.0	**.5**
Career		4	0	4.0	.000	.000	.500	1.3	.5	.0	.3	.5

=== EuroLeague ===
Year	Team	GP	GS	MPG	FG%	3P%	FT%	RPG	APG	SPG	BPG	PPG	PIR
2021–22	UNICS	23	12	12.6	.319	.143	.684	1.6	0.5	0.9	0.1	3.3	2.0
Career		23	12	12.6	.319	.143	.684	1.6	0.5	0.9	0.1	3.3	2.0

=== College ===
Year	Team	GP	GS	MPG	FG%	3P%	FT%	RPG	APG	SPG	BPG	PPG
2015–16	College of Charleston	31	31	28.4	.462	.333	.716	7.3	1.3	1.3	.5	11.7
2016–17	College of Charleston	**35**	**34**	32.0	.459	.369	.758	**8.4**	1.2	1.1	.7	14.2
2017–18	College of Charleston	24	21	32.3	.500	**.385**	**.821**	7.1	1.7	1.0	.8	17.3
2018–19	College of Charleston	33	33	**34.0**	**.517**	.328	.785	**8.4**	**2.4**	**1.4**	**.9**	**19.4**
Career		123	119	31.7	.487	.353	.768	7.9	1.7	1.2	.7	15.6
