= 1997–98 Charleston Cougars men's basketball team =

American college basketball season

1997–98 Charleston Cougars men's basketball

TAAC Regular Season champion TAAC tournament champion

NCAA tournament, first round
- Conference: Trans America Athletic Conference
- East Division
- Record: 24–6 (14–2 TAAC)
- Head coach: John Kresse (19th season)
- Home arena: John Kresse Arena

1997–98 Trans America Athletic Conference men's basketball standings
	Conf.				Overall
Team	W		L	PCT	W		L	PCT
East
College of Charleston †	14	–	2	.875	24	–	6	.800
Florida International	13	–	3	.813	21	–	8	.724
Central Florida	11	–	5	.688	17	–	11	.607
Stetson	8	–	8	.500	11	–	15	.423
Florida Atlantic	5	–	11	.313	5	–	22	.185
Campbell	4	–	12	.250	10	–	17	.370
West
Georgia State	11	–	5	.688	16	–	12	.571
Samford	9	–	7	.563	14	–	13	.519
Centenary	8	–	8	.500	10	–	20	.333
Jacksonville State	6	–	10	.375	12	–	14	.462
Troy	5	–	11	.313	7	–	20	.259
Mercer	2	–	14	.125	5	–	21	.192
† 1998 TAAC tournament winner Rankings from AP poll

The 1997–98 College of Charleston Cougars men's basketball team represented the College of Charleston in the 1997–98 NCAA Division I men's basketball season. The Cougars, led by 19th-year head coach John Kresse, played their home games at F. Mitchell Johnson Arena in Charleston, South Carolina as members of the Trans America Athletic Conference.

After finishing atop the conference regular season standings (14–2), the Cougars also won the 1998 TAAC tournament to earn an automatic bid to the NCAA tournament as No. 14 seed in the Midwest region. College of Charleston was beaten in the opening round by eventual Final Four participant Stanford, 67–57. The team finished with an overall record of 24–6.

== Roster ==
1997–98 College of Charleston Cougars men's basketball team
Players
Coaches

Pos.	#	Name	Height	Weight	Year	Previous school	Hometown
G	20	Jermel President	5 ft 11 in (1.8 m)	—	Jr	Burke	Charleston, South Carolina
F	23	Sedric Webber	6 ft 6 in (1.98 m)	195 lb (88 kg)	Jr	W. J. Keenan	Columbia, South Carolina

Head coach

- John Kresse (St. John's)

Assistant coach(es)

Legend

- (C) Team captain
- (S) Suspended
- (I) Ineligible
- (W) Walk-on
- Injured
- Current redshirt

Roster

== Schedule and results ==
Date time, TV	Rank^{#}	Opponent^{#}	Result	Record	Site (attendance) city, state
Regular season
Nov 15, 1997*		Tennessee Wesleyan	W 83–44	1–0	F. Mitchell Johnson Center (3,277); Charleston, South Carolina
Nov 19, 1997*		Charleston Southern	W 91–64	2–0	F. Mitchell Johnson Center (5,121); Charleston, South Carolina
Nov 25, 1997*		at George Mason	W 68–56	3–0	Patriot Center (2,411); Fairfax, Virginia
Dec 2, 1997*		at UMass	L 40–52	3–1	Mullins Center (7,536); Amherst, Massachusetts
Dec 6, 1997*		The Citadel	W 56–44	4–1	F. Mitchell Johnson Center (3,516); Charleston, South Carolina
Dec 20, 1997*		Guilford	W 71–47	5–1	F. Mitchell Johnson Center (2,743); Charleston, South Carolina
Dec 28, 1997*		Rider; Franklin Life Classic	L 58–65	5–2	F. Mitchell Johnson Center (2,803); Charleston, South Carolina
Dec 29, 1997*		Columbia; Franklin Life Classic	W 77–55	6–2	F. Mitchell Johnson Center (2,251); Charleston, South Carolina
Jan 3, 1998		at Centenary	W 64–51	7–2 (1–0)	Gold Dome (1,050); Shreveport, Louisiana
Jan 5, 1998		Troy	W 92–42	8–2 (2–0)	F. Mitchell Johnson Center (2,762); Charleston, South Carolina
Jan 8, 1998		at Samford	W 50–49	9–2 (3–0)	Seibert Hall (1,466); Homewood, Alabama
Jan 10, 1998		at Jacksonville State	W 88–63	10–2 (4–0)	Pete Mathews Coliseum (1,022); Jacksonville, Alabama
Jan 12, 1998*		at The Citadel	L 63–64	10–3	McAlister Field House (5,236); Charleston, South Carolina
Jan 15, 1998		Florida International	W 81–62	11–3 (5–0)	F. Mitchell Johnson Center (3,495); Charleston, South Carolina
Jan 17, 1998		Florida Atlantic	W 74–56	12–3 (6–0)	F. Mitchell Johnson Center (3,207); Charleston, South Carolina
Jan 22, 1998		at Central Florida	W 65–47	13–3 (7–0)	UCF Arena (1,439); Orlando, Florida
Jan 24, 1998		at Stetson	W 67–63	14–3 (8–0)	Edmunds Center (3,622); DeLand, Florida
Jan 29, 1998		Campbell	W 65–39	15–3 (9–0)	F. Mitchell Johnson Center (3,392); Charleston, South Carolina
Jan 31, 1998		Mercer	W 67–47	16–3 (10–0)	F. Mitchell Johnson Center (3,437); Charleston, South Carolina
Feb 2, 1998		Georgia State	W 79–53	17–3 (11–0)	F. Mitchell Johnson Center (3,201); Charleston, South Carolina
Feb 7, 1998		at Campbell	W 62–49	18–3 (12–0)	Carter Gymnasium (864); Buies Creek, North Carolina
Feb 12, 1998		at Florida Atlantic	W 72–49	19–3 (13–0)	FAU Arena (2,839); Boca Raton, Florida
Feb 14, 1998		at Florida International	L 67–74	19–4 (13–1)	Golden Panther Arena (1,525); Westchester, Florida
Feb 16, 1998*		Wofford	W 79–45	20–4	F. Mitchell Johnson Center (3,037); Charleston, South Carolina
Feb 19, 1998		Stetson	W 67–53	21–4 (14–1)	F. Mitchell Johnson Arena (2,971); Charleston, South Carolina
Feb 21, 1998		Central Florida	L 68–70 ^{OT}	21–5 (14–2)	F. Mitchell Johnson Arena (3,417); Charleston, South Carolina
TAAC tournament
Feb 26, 1998*	(1)	(8) Campbell; Quarterfinals	W 78–64	22–5	F. Mitchell Johnson Arena (3,249); Charleston, South Carolina
Feb 27, 1998*	(1)	(5) Central Florida; Semifinals	W 81–66	23–5	F. Mitchell Johnson Arena (3,641); Charleston, South Carolina
Feb 28, 1998*	(1)	(2) Florida International; Championship Game	W 72–63	24–5	F. Mitchell Johnson Arena (3,371); Charleston, South Carolina
NCAA Tournament
Mar 13, 1998*; CBS	(14 MW)	(3 MW) No. 10 Stanford; First round	L 57–67	24–6	United Center (21,158); Chicago, Illinois
*Non-conference game. ^{#}Rankings from AP Poll. (#) Tournament seedings in parentheses. MW=Midwest. All times are in Eastern.

== Awards and honors ==
- Sedric Webber – TAAC co-Player of the Year
- John Kresse – TAAC Coach of the Year
