= Milan Brown =

American college basketball coach

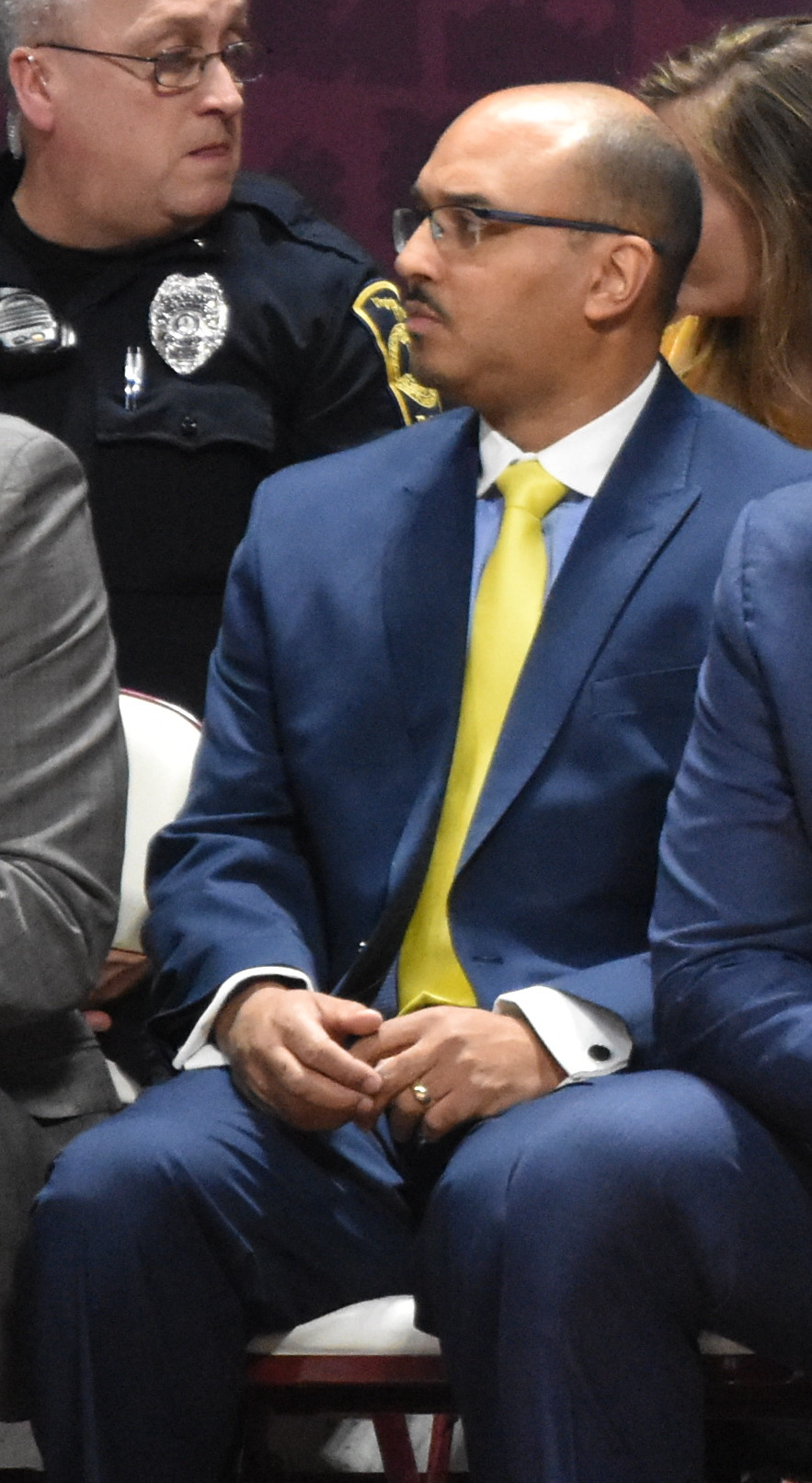

Current position
- Title: Assistant coach
- Team: Pittsburgh
- Conference: ACC

Biographical details
- Born: January 1971 (age 55); Hampton, Virginia, U.S.

Playing career
- 1989–1993: Howard

Coaching career (HC unless noted)
- 1995–1997: Old Dominion (asst.)
- 1997–2000: Mount St. Mary's (asst.)
- 2000–2002: William & Mary (asst.)
- 2002–2003: Mount St. Mary's (asst.)
- 2003–2010: Mount St. Mary's
- 2010–2015: Holy Cross
- 2015–2018: College of Charleston (asst.)
- 2018–present: Pittsburgh (asst.)

Head coaching record
- Overall: 164–203 (.447)

Milan Brown (born January 1971) is an American college basketball coach. He is currently an assistant coach for Pittsburgh. He was the head coach at Holy Cross until his firing on March 6, 2015. Prior to assuming this position in 2010, he succeeded Jim Phelan at Mount Saint Mary's University, who retired in 2003 after coaching for 49 years.

Brown graduated in 1993 from Howard University, playing basketball there for four years. Brown was a member of the Bison squad which made the school's last NCAA tournament in 1992. His number was retired by the school in December 2005.

On March 12, 2008, Brown led the Mountaineers to the 2007–08 Northeast Conference Championship game where they were victorious, 68–55, over Sacred Heart University. He led his team to a 69–60 victory over Coppin State University in the opening round of the 2008 NCAA Men's Division I Basketball Tournament. The Mount lost 113–74 to the University of North Carolina in the first round.

Brown completed his sixth season as head coach with a 69–58 loss to James Madison University in the opening round of the 2009 CollegeInsider.com Tournament on March 18, 2009.

In Brown's final season at the Mount, he led the Mountaineers to a 16–15 overall record and 12–6 in the Northeast Conference, good for a third-place finish. After starting the season 5–14, the Mount ran off 11 consecutive victories, its longest streak since winning 15 straight in the 1995–96 season. His tenure ended at the Mount when they lost to Robert Morris University, 80–62, in the Northeast Conference semifinals.

He finished his time at the Mount with a record of 95–120, 68–58 in Northeast Conference play.

In 2010, during his tenure at Holy Cross, he became the first black member of the Worcester Country Club, having been sponsored by Holy Cross alumnus Bob Cousy.

== Head coaching record ==
Record table
Season	Team	Overall	Conference	Standing	Postseason
Mount St. Mary's Mountaineers (Northeast Conference) (2003–2010)
2003–04	Mount St. Mary's	10–19	8–10	T–8th	
2004–05	Mount St. Mary's	7–20	5–13	10th	
2005–06	Mount St. Mary's	13–17	11–7	4th	
2006–07	Mount St. Mary's	11–20	9–9	T–4th	
2007–08	Mount St. Mary's	19–15	11–7	T–4th	NCAA First Round
2008–09	Mount St. Mary's	19–14	12–6	T–2nd	CIT First Round
2009–10	Mount St. Mary's	16–15	12–6	3rd	
Mount St. Mary's:		95–120 (.442)	68–58 (.540)		
Holy Cross Crusaders (Patriot League) (2010–2015)
2010–11	Holy Cross	8–21	7–7	3rd	
2011–12	Holy Cross	15–14	9–5	4th	
2012–13	Holy Cross	12–18	4–10	7th	
2013–14	Holy Cross	20–14	12–6	3rd	CIT Second Round
2014–15	Holy Cross	14–16	8–10	T–6th	
Holy Cross:		69–83 (.454)	40–38 (.513)		
Total:		164–203 (.447)			
National champion Postseason invitational champion Conference regular season champion Conference regular season and conference tournament champion Division regular season champion Division regular season and conference tournament champion Conference tournament champion
