= Grant Riller =

American basketball player (born 1997)

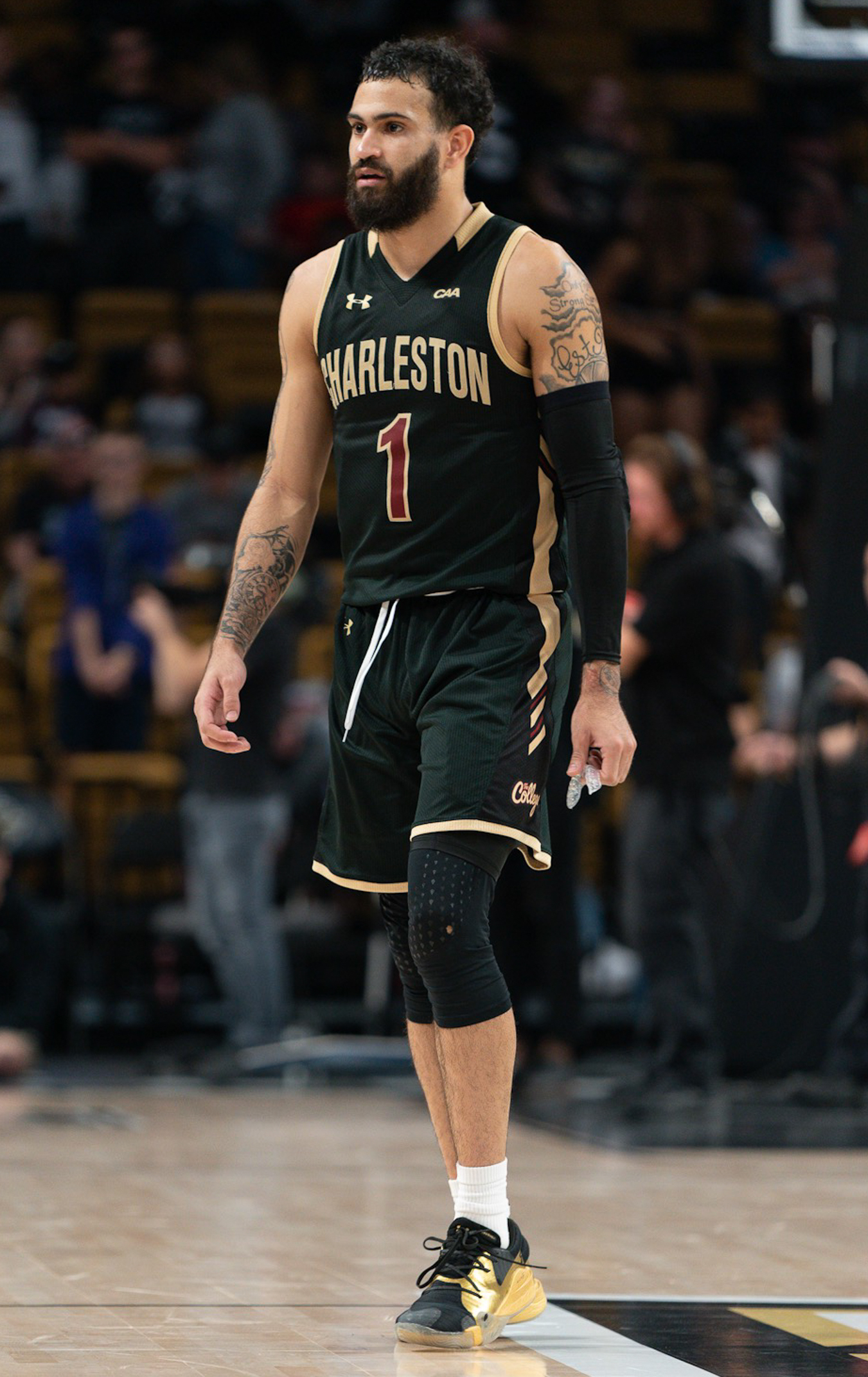
- Riller with College of Charleston in 2019

No. 24 – Beijing Royal Fighters
- Position: Point guard / shooting guard
- League: CBA

Personal information
- Born: February 8, 1997 (age 29) Orlando, Florida, U.S.
- Listed height: 6 ft 1 in (1.85 m)
- Listed weight: 190 lb (86 kg)

Career information
- High school: Ocoee (Ocoee, Florida)
- College: College of Charleston (2016–2020)
- NBA draft: 2020: 2nd round, 56th overall pick
- Drafted by: Charlotte Hornets
- Playing career: 2020–present

Career history
- 2020–2021: Charlotte Hornets
- 2020–2021: →Greensboro Swarm
- 2021: Delaware Blue Coats
- 2022–2023: Texas Legends
- 2023–present: Beijing Royal Fighters

Career highlights
- 3× First-team All-CAA (2018–2020); CAA tournament MVP (2018)
- Stats at NBA.com
- Stats at Basketball Reference

Grant Lucas Riller (born February 8, 1997) is an American professional basketball player for the Beijing Royal Fighters of the Chinese Basketball Association (CBA). He played college basketball for the College of Charleston Cougars.

== High school career ==
Riller played basketball for Ocoee High School in Ocoee, Florida under head coach Rob Gordon. He was called up to the varsity team in ninth grade after initially playing at the junior varsity level. As a senior on December 28, 2014, Riller scored a school-record 53 points in a win over Leesburg High School in the finals of the Ocoee Great 8 tournament. He averaged 29.1 points per game in his senior season. Riller was deemed a two-star recruit by 247Sports and was not rated by ESPN or Rivals. On October 4, 2014, he committed to play college basketball for the College of Charleston over offers from Cleveland State, FIU, and Hofstra.

== College career ==
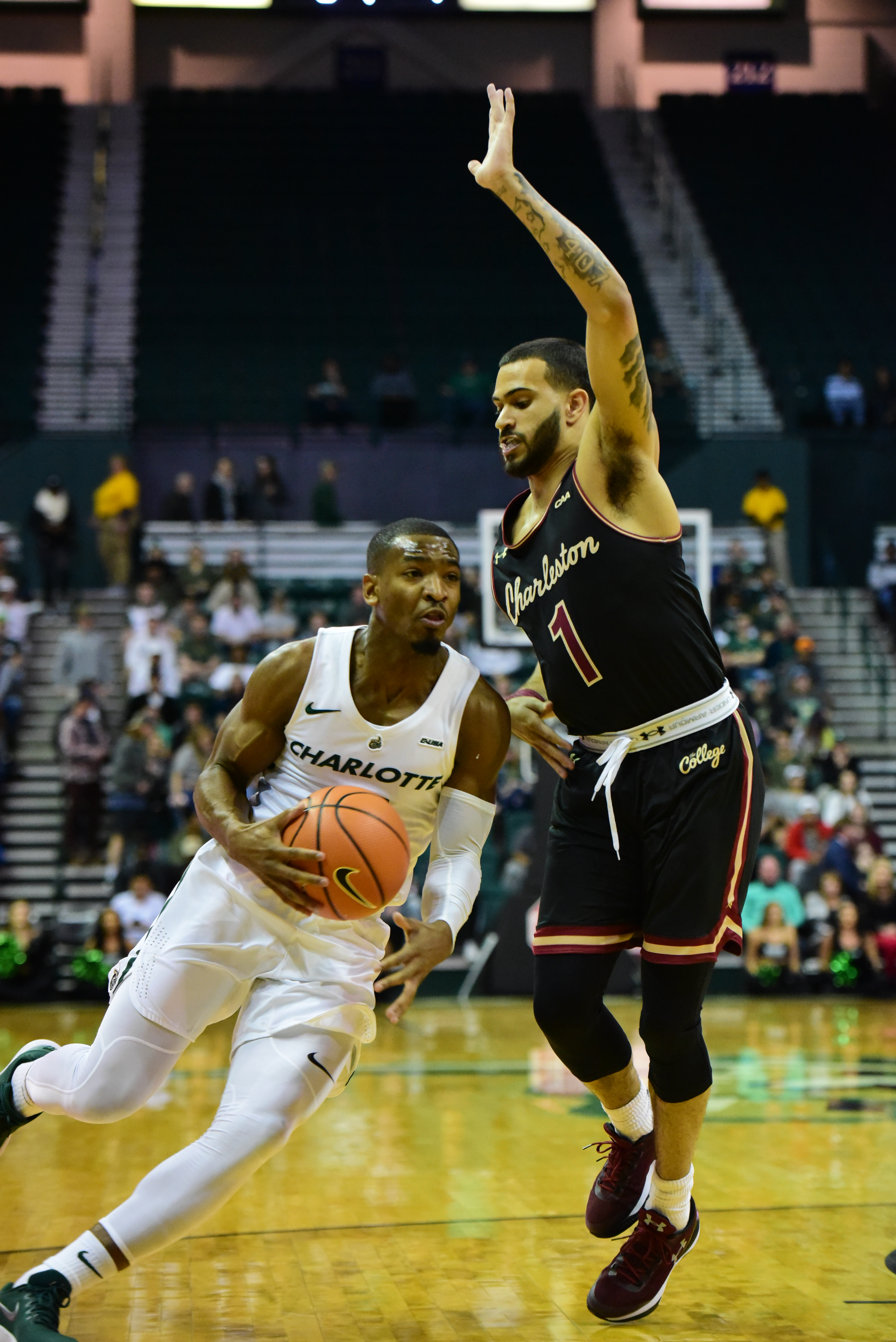
Riller (right) in November 2017

Riller suffered a knee injury prior to his freshman season and was forced to redshirt. He was forced to wear a knee brace despite working all summer to get to full strength. In his collegiate debut, Riller scored 21 points against The Citadel. He averaged 13.1 points per game as a freshman, second-best on the team. Riller scored 20 points and added four steals in an 83–76 overtime victory over Northeastern in the Colonial Athletic Association Tournament. He was named 2018 CAA Tournament Most Outstanding player and joined teammate Joe Chealey on the All-CAA First Team. Riller averaged 18.7 points per game as a sophomore. He scored a career-high 43 points in a 99–95 loss to Hofstra. As a junior, Riller averaged 21.9 points and 4.1 assists per game and led the Cougars to a 24–9 record. He was again named first-team All-CAA.

Coming into his senior year, Riller was named CAA preseason player of the year. On December 14, 2019, Riller became the third Cougar in program history to reach the 2,000 career point mark, scoring 21 in a road loss to Richmond. On January 16, 2020, he recorded the first-ever triple-double by a College of Charleston player, with 20 points, 10 rebounds and 10 assists in a loss to Northeastern. At the conclusion of the regular season, Riller was named to the First Team All-CAA. As a senior, Riller averaged 21.9 points, 3.9 assists, and 5.1 rebounds per game.

== Professional career ==
=== Charlotte Hornets (2020–2021) ===
On November 18, 2020, Riller was drafted in the second round, 56th overall, in the 2020 NBA draft by the Charlotte Hornets. On November 30, 2020, he was signed to a two-way contract by the team. Under the terms of the deal, he split time between the Hornets and their NBA G League affiliate, the Greensboro Swarm. He played in 11 G League games, averaging 13.1 points and 3.1 assists per game, and appeared in seven NBA games, averaging 2.6 points and 0.4 assists per game.

=== Delaware Blue Coats (2021) ===
On August 30, 2021, Riller signed a two-way contract with the Philadelphia 76ers. However, he was waived on December 19 after making four appearances for the Delaware Blue Coats, Philadelphia's affiliate.

=== Texas Legends (2022–2023) ===
On November 3, 2022, Riller was named to the opening night roster of the Texas Legends. Across 26 games he averaged 21.3 points, 3.8 assists, and 2.8 rebounds per game.

=== Beijing Royal Fighters (2023–present) ===
On August 22, 2023, Riller signed to play for the Beijing Royal Fighters of the Chinese Basketball Association. In his first season with the team, Riller averaged 15.6 points, 3.2 rebounds, and 2.6 assists per game in 44 appearances. He improved in his second season, averaging 20.3 points, 4.2 assists, and 3.6 rebounds per game in 43 appearances.

== Career statistics ==
Legend
GP	Games played	GS	Games started	MPG	Minutes per game
FG%	Field goal percentage	3P%	3-point field goal percentage	FT%	Free throw percentage
RPG	Rebounds per game	APG	Assists per game	SPG	Steals per game
BPG	Blocks per game	PPG	Points per game	**Bold**	Career high

=== NBA ===
==== Regular season ====
Year	Team	GP	GS	MPG	FG%	3P%	FT%	RPG	APG	SPG	BPG	PPG
2020–21	Charlotte	7	0	3.9	.667	.500	—	.1	.4	.1	.0	2.6
Career		7	0	3.9	.667	.500	—	.1	.4	.1	.0	2.6

=== College ===
Year	Team	GP	GS	MPG	FG%	3P%	FT%	RPG	APG	SPG	BPG	PPG
2015–16	College of Charleston	Redshirt										
2016–17	College of Charleston	**35**	27	27.0	.486	.333	.798	2.1	1.2	.9	.2	13.1
2017–18	College of Charleston	33	32	33.6	**.545**	**.394**	.729	2.8	2.0	1.3	**.4**	18.6
2018–19	College of Charleston	33	**33**	**35.5**	.538	.329	.806	3.4	**4.1**	1.2	.1	**21.9**
2019–20	College of Charleston	31	31	33.5	.499	.362	**.827**	**5.1**	3.9	**1.6**	.3	**21.9**
Career		132	123	32.3	.519	.356	.796	3.3	2.8	1.3	.3	18.7
