= John Kresse =

American basketball coach (born 1943)

Biographical details
- Born: April 17, 1943 (age 83); Brooklyn, New York, U.S.

Playing career
- 1961–1964: St. John's

Coaching career (HC unless noted)
- 1965–1970: St. John's (asst.)
- 1970–1973: New York Nets (asst.)
- 1973–1979: St. John's (asst.)
- 1979–2002: College of Charleston

Head coaching record
- Overall: 560–143 (.797)
- Tournaments: 1–4 (NCAA Division I); 15–5 (NAIA); 1–2 (NIT)

Accomplishments and honors

Championships
- NAIA tournament (1983); 6 NAIA District 6 tournament (1983, 1985–1989); 2 TAAC tournament (1997, 1998); 5 TAAC regular season (1994–1998); SoCon tournament (1999); 2 SoCon regular season (1999, 2000)

Awards
- 5× NAIA District 6 Coach of the Year (1982, 1983, 1985, 1986, 1989); 3× TAAC Coach of the Year (1994, 1997, 1998); SoCon Coach of the Year (1999)
- College Basketball Hall of Fame; Inducted in 2018

John Leopold Kresse V (born April 17, 1943 in Brooklyn, New York) is an American basketball coach and writer.

== Career and personal life ==
Kresse is former head coach of the College of Charleston Cougars and assistant coach with the New York Nets and St. John's University. Kresse has the 5th highest winning percentage (.797) of any Division 1 NCAA college basketball coach with 560 wins and 143 losses during his 23 years as head coach of the College of Charleston. Kresse retired from coaching duties in 2002. In 2005, Kresse was inducted into the National Association of Intercollegiate Athletics Hall of Fame. The John Kresse Arena is named after him. Prior to the 2008–2009 basketball season, the College of Charleston moved to the Carolina First Arena where the playing surface is named John Kresse Court in honor of the coach. In 2009, Kresse was inducted into the New York City Basketball Hall of Fame.

Kresse coached the College of Charleston to the 1983 NAIA basketball title. One of the teams the Cougars defeated in the 1983 NAIA tournament was Chaminade, which had earlier in the season defeated a great Virginia team led by Ralph Sampson. In 1990, the College of Charleston moved from NAIA to NCAA Division I, and soon became known as a giant killer. Over the next few years, North Carolina, Georgia Tech, Maryland, Stanford, and other major power programs would fall to the Cougars.

John Leopold Kresse V is married to Dr. Sue Sommer-Kresse who also worked at the College of Charleston, and they have two sons, John Leopold Kresse VI and Ryan Henry Kresse.

== Head coaching record ==
Record table
Season	Team	Overall	Conference	Standing	Postseason
College of Charleston Cougars (NAIA District 6) (1979–1989)
1979–80	College of Charleston	17–11			
1980–81	College of Charleston	25–5			
1981–82	College of Charleston	25–5			
1982–83	College of Charleston	33–5			NAIA Champion
1983–84	College of Charleston	25–7			
1984–85	College of Charleston	30–4			NAIA Quarterfinals
1985–86	College of Charleston	26–9			NAIA Quarterfinals
1986–87	College of Charleston	31–2			NAIA Second Round
1987–88	College of Charleston	30–5			NAIA Third Place
1988–89	College of Charleston	26–6			NAIA Second Round
College of Charleston Cougars (Independent) (1989–1991)
1989–90	College of Charleston	19–8			
1990–91	College of Charleston	15–12			
College of Charleston Cougars (Independent) (1991–1993)
1991–92	College of Charleston	19–8			
1992–93	College of Charleston	19–8			
College of Charleston Cougars (Trans America Athletic Conference) (1993–1998)
1993–94	College of Charleston	24–4	14–2	1st	NCAA Division I First Round
1994–95	College of Charleston	23–6	15–1	1st	NIT First Round
1995–96	College of Charleston	25–4	15–1	1st (East)	NIT Second Round
1996–97	College of Charleston	29–3	16–0	1st (East)	NCAA Division I Second Round
1997–98	College of Charleston	24–6	14–2	1st (East)	NCAA Division I First Round
College of Charleston Cougars (Southern Conference) (1998–2002)
1998–99	College of Charleston	28–3	16–0	1st (South)	NCAA Division I First Round
1999–2000	College of Charleston	24–6	13–3	1st (South)	
2000–01	College of Charleston	22–7	12–4	1st (South)	
2001–02	College of Charleston	21–9	9–7	T–1st (South)	
College of Charleston:		560–143 (.797)	124–20 (.861)		
Total:		560–143 (.797)			
National champion Postseason invitational champion Conference regular season champion Conference regular season and conference tournament champion Division regular season champion Division regular season and conference tournament champion Conference tournament champion

== Selected bibliography ==
- The Complete Book of Man-To-Man Offense (with Richard Jablonski) ISBN 1-58518-873-5
- Attacking Zone Defenses (with Richard Jablonski) ISBN 1-58518-158-7
