= 2016–17 Charleston Cougars men's basketball team =

American college basketball season

2016–17 Charleston Cougars men's basketball

NIT, First round
- Conference: Colonial Athletic Association
- Record: 25–10 (14–4 CAA)
- Head coach: Earl Grant (3rd season)
- Assistant coaches: Milan Brown; JD Powell; Quinton Ferrell
- Home arena: TD Arena

2016–17 CAA men's basketball standings
	Conf.				Overall
Team	W		L	PCT	W		L	PCT
UNC Wilmington †	15	–	3	.833	29	–	6	.829
College of Charleston	14	–	4	.778	25	–	10	.714
Towson	11	–	7	.611	20	–	13	.606
Elon	10	–	8	.556	18	–	14	.563
William & Mary	10	–	8	.556	17	–	14	.548
Northeastern	8	–	10	.444	15	–	16	.484
Hofstra	7	–	11	.389	15	–	17	.469
James Madison	7	–	11	.389	10	–	23	.303
Delaware	5	–	13	.278	13	–	20	.394
Drexel	3	–	15	.167	9	–	23	.281
† 2017 CAA tournament winner

The 2016–17 College of Charleston Cougars men's basketball team represented the College of Charleston during the 2015–16 NCAA Division I men's basketball season. The Cougars were led by third-year head coach Earl Grant and played their home games at the TD Arena as members of the Colonial Athletic Association. They finished the season 25–10, 14–4 in CAA play to finish in second place. They defeated James Madison and Towson to advance to the championship game of the CAA tournament where they lost to UNC Wilmington. They received an invitation to the National Invitation Tournament where they lost in the first round to Colorado State.

== Previous season ==
The Cougars finished the 2015–16 season 17–14, 8–10 in CAA play to finish in seventh place. They advanced to the quarterfinals of the CAA tournament where they lost to UNC Wilmington.

== Departures ==
Name	Number	Pos.	Height	Weight	Year	Hometown	Notes
Donovan Gilmore	0	F	6'7"	210	Sophomore	Greensboro, NC	Transferred to UNC Asheville
Canyon Barry	24	G/F	6'6"	205	RS Junior	Colorado Springs, CO	Graduate transferred to Florida
Tim Branin II	25	G	6'1"	185	Freshman	Richmond, VA	Walk-on; left the team for personal reasons
Harrison Bowne	31	F	6'6"	225	Senior	Hickory, NC	Graduated
James Bourne	44	F	6'8"	240	RS Senior	Alexandria, VA	Graduated

== Recruiting ==
College recruiting information
Name	Hometown	School	Height	Weight	Commit date
Brevin Galloway; PG	Anderson, SC	Seneca High School	6 ft 0 in (1.83 m)	170 lb (77 kg)	May 6, 2015
Brevin Galloway; PG	Recruit ratings: Scout: Rivals: (NR)				
Chevez Goodwin; PF	Columbia, SC	Hammond School	6 ft 8 in (2.03 m)	205 lb (93 kg)	Aug 8, 2015
Chevez Goodwin; PF	Recruit ratings: Scout: Rivals: (NR)				
Jaylen McManus; SF	Charlotte, NC	North Mecklenburg High School	6 ft 7 in (2.01 m)	200 lb (91 kg)	Oct 31, 2014
Jaylen McManus; SF	Recruit ratings: Scout: Rivals: (NR)				
Osinachi Smart; C	Umuahia, Nigeria	New Garden Friends School	6 ft 8 in (2.03 m)	240 lb (110 kg)	Mar 28, 2016
Osinachi Smart; C	Recruit ratings: Scout: Rivals: (NR)				
Overall recruit ranking:
Note: In many cases, Scout, Rivals, 247Sports, On3, and ESPN may conflict in their listings of height and weight.; In these cases, the average was taken. ESPN grades are on a 100-point scale.; Sources: "2016 Team Ranking". Rivals.

== Roster ==
2016–17 College of Charleston Cougars men's basketball team
Players
Coaches

Pos.	#	Name	Height	Weight	Year	Previous school	Hometown
F	0	Chevez Goodwin	6 ft 9 in (2.06 m)	205 lb (93 kg)	Fr	Hammond School	Columbia, SC
G	1	Grant Riller	6 ft 3 in (1.91 m)	178 lb (81 kg)	RS Fr	Ocoee	Ocoee, FL
G	2	Brevin Galloway	6 ft 3 in (1.91 m)	205 lb (93 kg)	Fr	Seneca	Anderson, SC
G	3	Payton Hulsey	6 ft 5 in (1.96 m)	215 lb (98 kg)	Sr	Southwind/Eastern Florida	Memphis, TN
G	4	John Eck (W)	6 ft 4 in (1.93 m)	170 lb (77 kg)	Jr	Hilton Head Prep	Hilton Head Island, SC
F	5	Jarrell Brantley	6 ft 7 in (2.01 m)	245 lb (111 kg)	So	Notre Dame Prep	Columbia, SC
F	11	Evan Bailey	6 ft 6 in (1.98 m)	207 lb (94 kg)	So	Jackson	Canton, OH
G	12	Cameron Johnson	6 ft 4 in (1.93 m)	196 lb (89 kg)	Jr	Clarke Central	Athens, GA
G	13	Joe Chealey	6 ft 3 in (1.91 m)	195 lb (88 kg)	RS Jr	Apopka	Orlando, FL
F	15	Terrance O'Donohue	6 ft 7 in (2.01 m)	225 lb (102 kg)	Sr	Norcross	Norcorss, GA
G	21	Marquise Pointer	6 ft 0 in (1.83 m)	205 lb (93 kg)	So	Jonesboro	Jonesboro, AR
F	23	Nick Harris	6 ft 10 in (2.08 m)	245 lb (111 kg)	RS So	St. Pius X Catholic	Dacula, GA
F	24	Jaylen McManus	6 ft 7 in (2.01 m)	200 lb (91 kg)	Fr	North Mecklenburg	Charlotte, NC
F/C	33	Osinachi Smart	6 ft 8 in (2.03 m)	240 lb (109 kg)	Fr	New Garden Friends School	Umuahia, Nigeria

Head coach

- Earl Grant (Georgia College)

Assistant coach(es)

- JD Powell (Clemson)
- Milan Brown (Howard)
- Quinton Ferrell (Presbyterian)

Legend

- (C) Team captain
- (S) Suspended
- (I) Ineligible
- (W) Walk-on
- Injured
- Current redshirt

Roster

== Schedule and results ==
Date time, TV	Rank^{#}	Opponent^{#}	Result	Record	Site (attendance) city, state
Exhibition
11/04/2016*; 7:00 pm		Allen	W 118–67		TD Arena; Charleston, SC
Non-Conference regular season
11/11/2016*; 7:00 pm, WCIV		The Citadel	W 81–68	1–0	TD Arena (4,178); Charleston, SC
11/14/2016*; 7:00 pm		at Coastal Carolina	W 71–64	2–0	HTC Center (2,325); Conway, SC
11/17/2016*; 7:30 pm, ESPN3		Boise State; Charleston Classic quarterfinals	W 60–47	3–0	TD Arena (3,430); Charleston, SC
11/18/2016*; 7:30 pm, ESPNU		UCF; Charleston Classic semifinals	L 40–60	3–1	TD Arena (3,517); Charleston, SC
11/20/2016*; 7:00 pm, ESPNU		Wake Forest; Charleston Classic 3rd place game	L 61–78	3–2	TD Arena (4,325); Charleston, SC
11/23/2016*; 7:00 pm, FS1		at No. 2 Villanova; Charleston Classic	L 47–63	3–3	The Pavilion (6,500); Villanova, PA
11/27/2016*; 4:00 pm		USC Upstate	W 72–60	4–3	TD Arena (2,892); Charleston, SC
12/01/2016*; 7:30 pm, WCIV		Navy	W 70–64	5–3	TD Arena (3,327); Charleston, SC
12/04/2016*; 4:00 pm, WCIV		Davidson	W 76–61	6–3	TD Arena (3,618); Charleston, SC
12/11/2016*; 2:00 pm		vs. Anderson	W 59–45	7–3	North Charleston Coliseum (502); North Charleston, SC
12/15/2016*; 7:00 pm, ASN/ESPN3		at East Carolina	W 53–35	8–3	Williams Arena (3,462); Greenville, NC
12/19/2016*; 8:00 pm, SECN+		at LSU	L 65–75	8–4	Maravich Center (6,619); Baton Rouge, LA
12/22/2016*; 7:00 pm		at Western Carolina	W 77–59	9–4	Ramsey Center (1,103); Cullowhee, NC
CAA regular season
12/31/2016; 2:00 pm		at Elon	W 66–54	10–4 (1–0)	Alumni Gym (1,055); Elon, NC
01/02/2017; 8:00 pm		at Delaware	W 65–56	11–4 (2–0)	Bob Carpenter Center (2,619); Newark, DE
01/05/2017; 7:30 pm, WCIV		Towson	W 62–57	12–4 (3–0)	TD Arena (3,296); Charleston, SC
01/07/2017; 4:00 pm, WCIV		Hofstra	W 77–71	13–4 (4–0)	TD Arena (3,604); Charleston, SC
01/12/2017; 7:00 pm		at James Madison	W 53–51	14–4 (5–0)	JMU Convocation Center (2,768); Harrisonburg, VA
01/14/2017; 4:00 pm, WCIV		William & Mary	W 77–67	15–4 (6–0)	TD Arena (3,722); Charleston, SC
01/19/2017; 7:00 pm, ASN		UNC Wilmington	L 59–65	15–5 (6–1)	TD Arena (4,631); Charleston, SC
01/21/2017; 4:00 pm, WCIV		James Madison	W 73–60	16–5 (7–1)	TD Arena (3,889); Charleston, SC
01/26/2017; 7:00 pm		at Towson	L 77–83 ^{OT}	16–6 (7–2)	SECU Arena (2,076); Towson, MD
01/28/2017; 2:00 pm, ASN		at Drexel	W 90–76	17–6 (8–2)	Daskalakis Athletic Center (1,602); Philadelphia, PA
02/02/2017; 7:00 pm		at UNC Wilmington	W 67–66	18–6 (9–2)	Trask Coliseum (5,200); Wilmington, NC
02/04/2017; 5:00 pm, WCIV		Elon	W 71–58	19–6 (10–2)	TD Arena (4,081); Charleston, SC
02/09/2017; 7:00 pm		Northeastern	L 72–73	19–7 (10–3)	TD Arena (2,916); Charleston, SC
02/11/2017; 2:00 pm, CSN		at William & Mary	L 79–89	19–8 (10–4)	Kaplan Arena (5,107); Williamsburg, VA
02/16/2017; 7:00 pm, ASN		at Hofstra	W 76–72	20–8 (11–4)	Mack Sports Complex (1,619); Hempstead, NY
02/18/2017; 1:00 pm		at Northeastern	W 85–71	21–8 (12–4)	Matthews Arena (1,447); Boston, MA
02/23/2017; 7:30 pm, WCIV		Delaware	W 78–65	22–8 (13–4)	TD Arena (3,384); Charleston, SC
02/25/2017; 5:00 pm		Drexel	W 80–67	23–8 (14–4)	TD Arena (3,111); Charleston, SC
CAA tournament
03/04/2017; 6:00 pm, CSN	(2)	vs. (7) James Madison; Quarterfinals	W 67–62	24–8	North Charleston Coliseum (4,212); North Charleston, SC
03/05/2017; 4:30 pm, CSN	(2)	vs. (3) Towson; Semifinals	W 67–59	25–8	North Charleston Coliseum (4,708); North Charleston, SC
03/06/2017; 7:00 pm, CBSSN	(2)	vs. (1) UNC Wilmington; Championship game	L 69–78	25–9	North Charleston Coliseum (6,342); North Charleston, SC
NIT
03/14/2017*; 9:00 PM, ESPN3	(5)	at (4) Colorado State; First round – California Bracket	L 74–81	25–10	Moby Arena (2,836); Fort Collins, CO
*Non-conference game. ^{#}Rankings from AP poll. (#) Tournament seedings in parentheses. All times are in Eastern Time.
