= Sedric Webber =

American basketball player (born 1977)

Personal information
- Born: January 5, 1977 (age 49) New York City, New York, U.S.
- Listed height: 6 ft 6 in (1.98 m)
- Listed weight: 200 lb (91 kg)

Career information
- High school: W. J. Keenan (Columbia, South Carolina)
- College: College of Charleston (1995–1999)
- NBA draft: 1999: undrafted
- Playing career: 1999–2006
- Position: Small forward

Career history
- 1999: Kansas Cagerz
- 1999–2000: 08 Stockholm
- 2000–2001: Salina Rattlers
- 2001: New Mexico Slam
- 2001: Kansas Cagerz
- 2001–2003: North Charleston Lowgators
- 2002: Shell Turbo Chargers
- 2003–2004: Marinos de Oriente
- 2004: Columbus Riverdragons
- 2005–2006: Marinos de Anzoátegui
- 2006: Sydney Kings

Career highlights
- 2× All-NBDL Second Team (2002, 2003); SoCon Player of the Year (1999); TAAC Co-Player of the Year (1998); First-team All-SoCon (1999); First-team All-TAAC (1998)

Sedric Webber (born January 5, 1977), sometimes misspelled as Cedric Webber, is an American retired professional basketball player. He played the small forward position for a career that spanned between 1999 and 2006 in which he played in numerous countries and leagues. Webber was also a standout college player for the College of Charleston (CofC) between 1995 and 1999.

== College ==
Webber played for the CofC Cougars under head coach John Kresse between 1995–96 and 1998–99. During his four-year career he scored 1,267 points and 694 rebounds. As a junior in 1997–98 he was named the Trans-America Athletic Conference (TAAC) Co-Player of the Year after averaging 15.1 points and 7.9 rebounds per game. The TAAC changed its name in 2001 to the Atlantic Sun Conference.

During the summer after his junior year, Webber was ticketed for trespassing and disorderly conduct when he was playing pick-up basketball in CofC's arena, then refused to leave the premises. His defense attorney proved that they were let in and authorized to play, and the charges were thrown out by a judge. Also between his junior and senior years, the College of Charleston switched athletic conferences and became members of the Southern Conference beginning in the 1998–99 school year.

As a senior, Webber claimed his second straight conference player of the year award after leading the Cougars to their second consecutive NCAA Tournament appearance. He averaged 13.8 points, 7.2 rebounds and 2.1 assists per game, all of which led CofC. By winning back-to-back player of the year awards, and due to CofC's conference switch, Webber joined Granger Hall as the second Division I men's basketball player to have won conference player of the year in two different Division I conferences (in 2013–14, Creighton's Doug McDermott became the third).

== Professional ==
Webber did not get selected in the 1999 NBA draft. His professional career thus began in the United States Basketball League for the Kansas Cagerz. Over the next seven seasons, Webber was somewhat of a journeyman, spending time in various leagues in the United States as well as Australia, the Philippines, Sweden, and Venezuela. His greatest success came while playing in the NBA Development League. Between 2001–02 and 2003–04, while playing for the North Charleston Lowgators and Columbus Riverdragons, Webber was twice named to the All-NBA Development League Team (2002, 2003). In each of those seasons he finished in the top five in scoring. For the 2002–03 season, he finished fifth in field goal attempts and sixth in total field goals, fifth in free throw attempts, third in total steals and steals per game, fifth in minutes per game, ninth in points per game and fifth in total points, third in minutes played, sixth in total offensive rebounds, tenth in total assists, and was the overall number one player with 50 total games played. He was considered the Lowgators' "go-to guy" that season, according to head coach Doug Marty. In 2003–04, Webber earned the NBDL Player of the Month Award for March 2004.

Webber's professional career ended in 2006 after playing for his final club, the Sydney Kings in Australia's National Basketball League.
