= Charleston Cougars men's basketball =

NCAA Division I college basketball team

2026–27 Charleston Cougars men's basketball team
- University: College of Charleston
- Head coach: John Groce (1st season)
- Location: Charleston, South Carolina
- Arena: TD Arena (capacity: 5,100)
- Conference: Coastal Athletic Association
- Nickname: Cougars
- Colors: Maroon and white

NCAA Division I tournament round of 32
- 1997

NCAA Division I tournament appearances
- 1994, 1997, 1998, 1999, 2018, 2023, 2024

NAIA tournament champions
- 1983
Other NAIA tournament results
Appearances	1983, 1985, 1986, 1987, 1988, 1989

Conference tournament champions
- Dixie: 1964; TAAC/A-Sun: 1997, 1998; SoCon: 1999; CAA: 2018, 2023, 2024

Conference regular-season champions
- TAAC/A-Sun: 1994, 1995, 1996, 1997, 1998; SoCon: 1999, 2000, 2003, 2011; CAA: 2018, 2023, 2024

Conference division champions
- TAAC/A-Sun East: 1996, 1997, 1998; SoCon South: 1999, 2000, 2001, 2002, 2003, 2004, 2011

The Charleston Cougars men's basketball team is an NCAA Division I college basketball team representing the College of Charleston in Charleston, South Carolina. The Cougars compete in the Coastal Athletic Association. Home games are played at TD Arena, located on College of Charleston's campus. While a member of the NAIA, they were National Champions in 1983. The Cougars have appeared in the NCAA tournament seven times, most recently in 2024.

== History ==
The College of Charleston has sponsored a men's basketball team since 1898. They have been NCAA Division I since 1991 in the Trans-Atlantic Athletic Conference (now ASUN Conference), the Southern Conference and presently the Coastal Athletic Association (formerly the Colonial Athletic Association). In 2012, ESPN ranked Charleston as the 73rd best college basketball program in the previous 50 years, which was the highest ranking of all Division I teams in the state of South Carolina.

=== John Kresse era (1979–2001) ===
After hiring St. John's assistant coach John Kresse in 1979, the College of Charleston Cougars began to achieve some notoriety. Kresse would lead the program to its first District Championship in 1983, propelling them to their first NAIA Tournament appearance. The Cougars advanced through the first four rounds and eventually defeated West Virginia Wesleyan 57–53 to win the 1983 NAIA Championship.

Kresse continued the program's success in the NAIA, winning five-straight District 6 Championships to ensure five-straight NAIA Tournament berths from 1985 to 1989. Despite failing to win another national championship, Kresse led the Cougars to a third-place finish in the 1988 Tournament.

During the 1991–92 season, the Cougars made the jump to Division I and defeated UNC–Charlotte 68–54 in their first game. After posting a 38–16 record through two seasons as an Independent program, the Cougars joined the Trans Atlantic Athletic Conference in 1993.

In their first season of conference play, the 1993–94 Cougars played to a 24–4 record (14–2 against TAAC opponents), earning the school its first regular season championship. Kresse earned his first TAAC Coach of the Year award, and Marion Busby earned the school's first TAAC Player of the Year award. The Cougars were unable to participate in the 1994 TAAC Tournament due to NCAA regulations, but they did receive an at-large bid to the 1994 NCAA Tournament as a #12 seed, ultimately losing to #5 Wake Forest 68–58 in the first round.

On December 15, 1994, Charleston's home arena, the F. Mitchell Johnson Center, was renamed as the "John Kresse Arena" in the coach's honor.

Kresse led the program to four more TAAC regular season championships from 1995 to 1998, earning back-to-back NIT invitations in 1995 and 1996. The Cougars defeated Tennessee 55–49 in the first round of the 1996 NIT behind the leadership of TAAC Player of the Year Thaddeous Delaney, before falling to Rhode Island 58–62 in overtime during the second round.

The 1996–97 Cougars, led by TAAC Player of the Year and future NBA-player Anthony Johnson, earned the first automatic berth to the NCAA Tournament in school history. After playing to a 29–3 record (16–0 in conference) and defeating Florida International 83–73 in the 1997 TAAC Championship Game, the Cougars would enter the 1997 NCAA Tournament as a #12 seed, despite being ranked No. 16 in the National AP Poll. Kresse's Cougars made program history by upsetting the #5 seed Maryland Terrapins 75–66 in the first round, before falling to the eventual National Champion, #4 Arizona 73–69.

The following year, 1997–98, saw the Cougars win a fifth-straight regular season championship after playing to a 24–6 record (14–2 in conference). Kresse earned his third TAAC Coach of the Year honor, and junior guard Sedric Webber was named TAAC Player of the Year, the third-straight, and fourth overall, Player of the Year in program history. The Cougars once again defeated Florida International in the TAAC Championship game, winning 72–63 to ensure their second NCAA Tournament appearance in a row, and third overall. As a #14 seed in the 1998 Tournament, the Cougars lost to #3 Stanford 67–57 in the first round.

During the 1998–99 season, the program transitioned from the TAAC to the Southern Conference, and gained national attention after upsetting then-No. 3 North Carolina 66–64 on December 5, 1998. After going 16–0 in conference, and 28–3 overall, the Cougars would win their first SoCon regular season championship, Kresse would earn his first SoCon Coach of the Year honor, and Sedric Webber would be named SoCon Player of the Year, his second-straight Player of the Year award. After running the table during the regular season, the Cougars would go on to defeat Furman 98–74, Western Carolina 80–49, and Appalachian State 77–67 in the championship game of their first SoCon Tournament, earning the program's third NCAA Tournament berth in a row. As a #8 seed in the 1999 Tournament, the highest seeding in program history, the Cougars were defeated by #9 Tulsa 62–53 in the first round.

Kresse coached the team for three more seasons into the new millennium, earning another regular season championship during the 1999–00 season, and Southern Division championships in 2000–01 and 2001–02, with teams led by SoCon Player of the Year Jody Lumpkin. Kresse retired at the end of the 2001–02 season, and still lives in Charleston to this day.

Over 23 years Kresse coached to a career record of 560–143 (.797), good for the 11th-highest winning percentage across all divisions in college basketball history. His Division I coaching record of 258-64 (.801) ranked the 5th highest in Division I history at the time of his retirement.

=== Tom Herrion era (2002–2006) ===
After the retirement of Kresse in 2002, Tom Herrion was hired as the 20th head coach in program history.

His first Charleston team won the Great Alaska Shootout in 2002 after defeating Wyoming 81–72, Oklahoma State 66–58, and Villanova 71–69 in the championship game, earning senior guard Troy Wheless the title of Tournament MVP. Herrion led his first team to a 25–8 record during the 2002–03 season, earning a regular season championship and an invitation to the 2003 NIT before losing in the second round. After the conclusion of the season Wheless was named SoCon Player of the Year, the program's third such honor since joining the SoCon, and seventh overall. Herrion's 25 victories marked the highest total of any first-year NCAA Division I head coach during the 2002–03 season.

Under Herrion the Cougars finished with a 20–9 record in 2003–04, an 18–10 performance in 2004–05, and a 17–11 finish in 2005–06. Herrion's final record was 80–38.

=== Bobby Cremins era (2006–2012) ===
The College of Charleston hired former Georgia Tech head coach Bobby Cremins in 2006. In four out of Cremins' five complete seasons, Charleston won at least 20 games, and the Cougars advanced to a national postseason tournament in three consecutive seasons. During Cremins' tenure the Cougars also relocated from John Kresse Arena to the Carolina First Center (later renamed TD Arena). Their first home game in the new stadium was a 72–66 victory over SIU Edwardsville on November 14, 2008.

During the 2009–10 season, the Cougars were put back in the national spotlight when they upset then-No.9 North Carolina on January 4, 2010, at TD Arena. Cremins led the program to a first round victory over Troy in the 2009 College Basketball Invitational, and had another first round win over Eastern Kentucky in the 2010 CBI.

The 2010–11 Cougars earned the program's first regular season championship in eight years with a 14–4 conference record, 25–10 overall. Cremins was named SoCon Coach of the Year and senior Andrew Goudelock was named SoCon Player of the Year. After losing to Wofford in the Championship Game of the SoCon Tournament the squad was invited to the 2011 NIT. The Cougars went on the longest postseason run in Division I program history, defeating Dayton 94–84 in the first round and Cleveland State 64–56 in the second round before falling to the eventual champions, Wichita State, 82–75 in the quarterfinals.

During the 2011–12 season Cremins took a leave of absence due to exhaustion and retired at the conclusion of the season. His overall record at Charleston was 125–68.

=== Doug Wojcik era (2012–2014) ===
Doug Wojcik, the all-time wins leader at the University of Tulsa, was named the 22nd all-time head coach at the College of Charleston on April 1, 2012. In his first season with the Cougars, Wojcik led Charleston to the SoCon Tournament Championship, ultimately losing to Davidson. The Cougars were added to the 2013 CBI, where they lost to George Mason in the first round. Charleston moved to the Colonial Athletic Association (now the Coastal Athletic Association) in 2013 and Wojcik's Cougars struggled to a 6–10 conference record. He was fired on August 5, 2014, with a 38–29 overall record.

=== Earl Grant era (2014–2021) ===
Earl Grant, a former Clemson and Wichita State assistant, was named the Cougars' 23rd all-time head coach on September 2, 2014. Charleston struggled in Grant's first year at the helm, finishing the season with just nine wins, a record-low since joining Division I. The Cougars did, however, win their first-ever CAA tournament game, a 56–48 decision over Drexel in the first round. Grant got his first signature win at Charleston the following season on November 30, 2015, when the Cougars defeated LSU 70–58 at TD Arena.

Grant's Cougars experienced the national postseason for the first time under his watch during the 2016–17 season. After finishing the regular season with a 23–8 record and losing in the CAA Tournament final, Charleston received an at-large bid to the 2017 NIT as a five seed. The Cougars ultimately lost at Colorado State, 81–74.

In the 2017–18 season, Coach Grant and the Cougars managed a 26–8 record, going 14–4 in the conference and undefeated at home, with sweeps over conference teams Delaware, Hofstra, Northeastern and UNC Wilmington. The Cougars would take the regular-season conference championship in a 79–58 win over Elon and would enter the CAA Tournament as a #1 seed, going on to win the tournament championship in an 83–76 OT win over Northeastern. Charleston would then receive a #13 seed spot in the 2018 NCAA Tournament and play #4 Auburn in San Diego, CA. After three more winning seasons without reaching the postseason, Grant left to be the head coach at Boston College.

=== Pat Kelsey era (2021–2024) ===
The Cougars hired Pat Kelsey, former head coach at Winthrop University, on March 25, 2021. Kelsey led the Cougars for just three seasons, but his era at Charleston is considered one of the most successful in program history. He led the team to a 75–27 (.735) overall record over his three seasons at the helm, including two conference regular season titles, two conference championship titles and two NCAA tournament appearances. He also introduced the "Our City" motto, meant to unite support for the team with the city of Charleston.

His team finished the 2022–23 season with a 31–4 record, including 4 weeks in the AP Top 25 poll, a conference championship title, and an NCAA tournament appearance. The team also won the Charleston Classic for the first time in program history. Kelsey signed an amended 5-year contract with the College of Charleston that would pay him a $1.1 million base salary, making him highest paid head coach in the Coastal Athletic Association.

The success continued into the 2023–24 season as he led the program to its first outright regular season title since 2003 and was named the Coastal Athletic Association Coach of the Year. Following the end of the season, Kelsey accepted the position as head coach at the University of Louisville.

College of Charleston president Andrew Hsu praised Kelsey upon news of his new position at Louisville, saying "he brought so much energy and excitement to Our City ... his impact goes far beyond basketball. His success reignited a premiere basketball school in a premiere city."

=== Chris Mack era (2024–2026) ===
Chris Mack, the former head coach at Xavier University and the University of Louisville, for whom Pat Kelsey was an assistant coach at the former, was named the 25th head coach in program history on April 2, 2024.

Mack led Charleston to two 20-win seasons and a 45–20 (.692) record as head coach, but fell short of winning any conference championships or NCAA tournament berths.

After two seasons leading the program, Chris Mack accepted the position as head coach at the University of South Florida.

=== John Groce era (2026–) ===
Charleston hired John Groce, former head coach at the University of Akron, on March 30, 2026.

== Conference affiliations ==
NAIA

- 1963–64 to 1969–70 – Dixie Intercollegiate Athletic Conference (Note: Currently known as the USA South Athletic Conference)
- 1970–71 to 1990–91 – NAIA independent

NCAA Division I

- 1991–92 to 1997–98 – Trans Atlantic Athletic Conference (Note: Currently known as the Atlantic Sun Conference.)
- 1998–99 to 2012–13 – Southern Conference
- 2013–14 to present – Coastal Athletic Association (Note: Formerly known as the Colonial Athletic Association until 2022–23.)

== Postseason ==
=== NCAA tournament results ===
The Cougars have appeared in the NCAA tournament seven times. Their combined record is 1–7.

Year	Seed	Round	Opponent	Result
1994	#12	First round	#5 Wake Forest	L 58–68
1997	#12	First round Second round	#5 Maryland #4 Arizona	W 75–66; L 69–73
1998	#14	First round	#3 Stanford	L 57–67
1999	#8	First round	#9 Tulsa	L 53–62
2018	#13	First round	#4 Auburn	L 58–62
2023	#12	First round	#5 San Diego State	L 57–63
2024	#13	First round	#4 Alabama	L 96–109

=== NIT results ===
The Cougars have appeared in the National Invitation Tournament (NIT) five times. Their combined record is 4–5.

Year	Round	Opponent	Result
1995	First round	Providence	L 67–72
1996	First round Second round	Tennessee; Rhode Island	W 55–49; L 58–62
2003	Opening Round; First round	Kent State; Providence	W 72–66; L 64–69
2011	First round Second round Quarterfinals	Dayton; Cleveland State; Wichita State	W 94–84; W 64–56; L 75–82
2017	First round	Colorado State	L 74–81

=== CBI results ===
The Cougars have appeared in the College Basketball Invitational (CBI) three times. Their combined record is 2–3.

Year	Round	Opponent	Result
2009	First round Quarterfinals	Troy; Richmond	W 93–91; L 72–74
2010	First round Quarterfinals	Eastern Kentucky; VCU	W 82–79; L 86–93
2013	First round	George Mason	L 77–78

=== NAIA tournament results ===
The Cougars have appeared in the NAIA tournament six times. Their combined record is 15–5. They were National Champions in 1983.

Year	Round	Opponent	Result
1983	First round Second round Quarterfinals; Semifinals; National Championship	Saint John's (MN); Oklahoma Panhandle State; Santa Fe; Chaminade; West Virginia Wesleyan	W 67–43; W 64–62 ^{OT} W 67–62; W 66–65; W 57–53
1985	First round Second round Quarterfinals	Castleton State; Southeastern Oklahoma State; Wayland Baptist	W 68–52; W 60–43; L 68–73
1986	First round Second round Quarterfinals	Taylor; Cumberland; Arkansas–Monticello	W 57–47; W 59–46; L 60–63
1987	First round Second round	Western State; Hawaiʻi–Hilo	W 67–51; L 57–65
1988	First round Second round Quarterfinals; Semifinals; National third-place game	Defiance; University of the Ozarks; Saint Thomas Aquinas; Auburn–Montgomery; Waynesburg	W 78–62; W 73–59; W 67–61; L 70–74; W 89–61
1989	First round Second round	Olivet Nazarene; Central Washington	W 79–64; L 55–66

== Awards and honors ==
=== Trans Atlantic Athletic Conference (1993–1998) ===
Season	Player of the Year	Coach of the Year	First Team All-TAAC	Second Team All-TAAC	Third Team All-TAAC	Rookie of the Year	Defensive Player of the Year	Sixth Man of the Year
1993–94	Marion Busby	John Kresse	Marion Busby	Thaddeous Delaney				
1994–95			Marion Busby (2), Thaddeous Delaney					
1995–96	Thaddeous Delaney		Thaddeous Delaney (2)	Stacy Harris				
1996–97	Anthony Johnson	John Kresse (2)	Thaddeous Delaney (3), Anthony Johnson	Rodney Conner				
1997–98	Sedric Webber	John Kresse (3)	Sedric Webber					

=== Southern Conference (1998–2013) ===
Season	Player of the Year	Coach of the Year	First Team All-SoCon	Second Team All-SoCon	Third Team All-SoCon	Rookie of the Year	Defensive Player of the Year	Sixth Man of the Year
1998–99	Sedric Webber	John Kresse	Sedric Webber	Danny Johnson, Jermel President				
1999–00			Jody Lumpkin	Jeff Bolton				
2000–01	Jody Lumpkin		Jody Lumpkin (2)	Jeff Bolton (2)				
2001–02			Jeff Bolton					
2002–03	Troy Wheless		Troy Wheless		Thomas Mobley			
2003–04				Thomas Mobley	Tony Mitchell			
2004–05			Tony Mitchell					
2005–06			Dontaye Draper	Ian Johnson	Josh Jackson	Jermaine Johnson		
2006–07			Dontaye Draper (2)		David Lawrence			
2007–08				Andrew Goudelock, Jermaine Johnson	Tony White Jr.			
2008–09			Andrew Goudelock		Jermaine Johnson			
2009–10			Andrew Goudelock (2)	Jeremy Simmons	Donavan Monroe		Jeremy Simmons	
2010–11	Andrew Goudelock	Bobby Cremins	Andrew Goudelock (3)		Donavan Monroe (2), Jeremy Simmons			
2011–12				Andrew Lawrence, Antwaine Wiggins	Trent Wiedeman			
2012–13				Andrew Lawrence (2)				

=== Colonial/Coastal Athletic Association (2013–present) ===
Season	Player of the Year	Coach of the Year	First Team All-CAA	Second Team All-CAA	Third Team All-CAA	Rookie of the Year	Defensive Player of the Year	Sixth Man of the Year
2013–14				Willis Hall				
2014–15	—							
2015–16					Jarrell Brantley, Cameron Johnson	Jarrell Brantley		
2016–17		Earl Grant	Joe Chealey	Jarrell Brantley				
2017–18			Joe Chealey (2), Grant Riller	Jarrell Brantley (2)				
2018–19			Jarrell Brantley, Grant Riller (2)					
2019–20			Grant Riller (3)					
2020–21				Zep Jasper				
2021–22				John Meeks	Dimitrius Underwood			
2022–23			Dalton Bolon		Ante Brzovic, Ryan Larson			Pat Robinson III
2023–24		Pat Kelsey	Ante Brzovic	Reyne Smith	Ben Burnham			Bryce Butler
2024–25			Ante Brzovic (2)		Derrin Boyd, CJ Fulton			
2025–26			Jlynn Counter		Christian Reeves		Chol Machot	

== Cougars in the NBA ==
Five former College of Charleston players have played in the NBA.

Name	Years Played	Teams
Jarrell Brantley	2020–2021	UTA
Joe Chealey	2019–2020	CHA
Andrew Goudelock	2012–2016	LAL and HOU
Anthony Johnson	1998–2010	SAC, ATL, ORL, CLE, NJN, IND, and DAL
Grant Riller	2021	CHA

== Cougars in international leagues ==
- Joe Chealey (born 1995), basketball player in the Israeli Basketball Premier League (ISBL)
- Andrew Goudelock (born 1988), basketball player in the Greek Basketball League (GBL)
- John Meeks (born 1999), basketball player in the Israeli Basketball Premier League
- Frankie Policelli (born 2000), basketball player in the Latvian–Estonian Basketball League (LEBL)
- Grant Riller (born 1997), basketball player in the Chinese Basketball Association (CBA)
