= Joe Chealey =

American basketball player (born 1995)

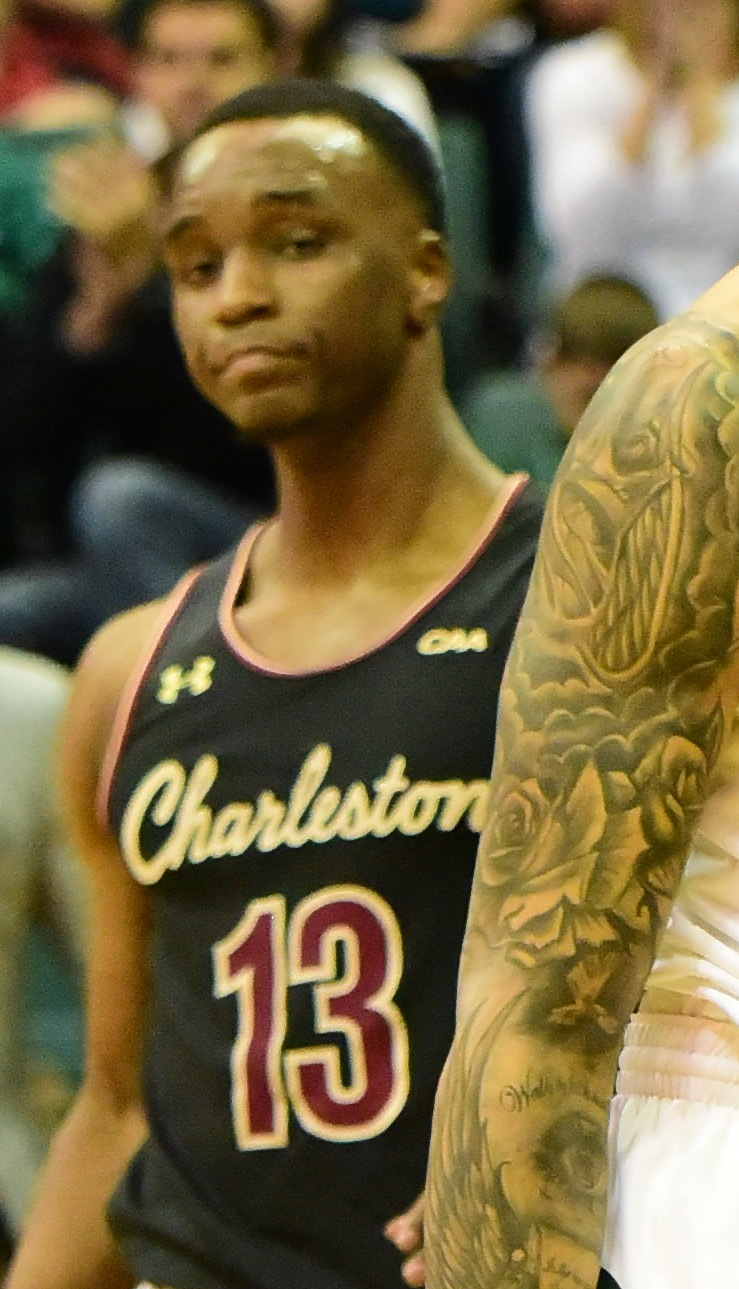
- Chealey with College of Charleston in 2017

Personal information
- Born: November 1, 1995 (age 31) Orlando, Florida, U.S.
- Listed height: 6 ft 4 in (1.93 m)
- Listed weight: 190 lb (86 kg)

Career information
- High school: Apopka (Apopka, Florida)
- College: College of Charleston (2013–2018)
- NBA draft: 2018: undrafted
- Playing career: 2018–2024
- Position: Point guard
- Number: 31

Career history
- 2018–2019: Charlotte Hornets
- 2018–2019: →Greensboro Swarm
- 2019–2020: Greensboro Swarm
- 2020: Charlotte Hornets
- 2021–2022: Greensboro Swarm
- 2022–2023: MKS Dąbrowa Górnicza
- 2023: Hapoel Eilat
- 2024: Juventus Utena

Career highlights
- 2× First-team All-CAA (2017, 2018)
- Stats at NBA.com
- Stats at Basketball Reference

Joseph Emmanuel Chealey (born November 1, 1995) is an American former professional basketball player who last played for Juventus Utena of the Lithuanian Basketball League (LKL). He played college basketball for College of Charleston located in South Carolina. He was born in Orlando, Florida where he grew up and went to Apopka High School.

== College career ==
Chealey was a part of the 2013 recruiting class and was a part of the College of Charleston Cougars' 14–18 team as a freshman. After the season, coach Earl Grant was hired and Chealey developed a strong relationship with him despite the team winning just nine games in Grant's first season. Chealey missed his junior year with a torn Achilles tendon in one of the first practices.

He averaged 17.2 points per game 3.3 assists per game and shot .822 from the free throw line as a redshirt junior and was named to the First-team All-CAA. As a senior, Chealey was seventh in the conference in scoring with 18.0 points per game and fifth in assists with 3.7 assists per game, and shot .858 from the free throw line. He was a repeat selection to the First-team All-CAA. He had 32 points in an 83–76 overtime victory over Northeastern in the conference championship to punch a ticket to the NCAA Tournament. Chealey was also named to the CAA All-Tournament team for a second straight season. During his four seasons of college career Chealey averaged 14.2 points, 3.5 rebounds and 3.1 assists in 31.1 minutes per game.

== Professional career ==
=== Charlotte Hornets (2018–2019) ===
After going undrafted in the 2018 NBA draft, Chealey played for the Charlotte Hornets 2018 summer league team. On July 27, 2018, Chealey joined the Hornets on a training camp deal. On October 13, his contract was converted into a two-way contract, meaning he would split his playing time between the Hornets and their NBA G League affiliate, the Greensboro Swarm, for the majority of the season. Chealey made his NBA debut with the Hornets on January 30, 2019, in a blowout loss to the Boston Celtics, scoring two points with an assist.

With Greensboro, he averaged 16.35 points and 5.42 assists per game.

On August 6, 2019, the Hornets announced that they had re-signed Chealey.

=== Greensboro Swarm (2019–2020) ===
Chealey was cut from the roster on October 13, 2019, during training camp. Following training camp, Chealey was re-added to the roster of the Swarm. He tallied 22 points, five rebounds, five assists, a steal and a block in a loss to the Delaware Blue Coats on December 19. On December 28, Chealey nearly posted a triple-double with 15 points, 10 rebounds, eight assists and four steals against the Raptors 905.

With Greensboro, he averaged 11.12 points and 4.32 assists per game, while shooting .813 from the free throw line.

=== Return to the Charlotte Hornets (2020) ===
On February 21, 2020, Chealey was signed to a 10-day contract by the Hornets, and a second 10-day contract on March 3.

=== Hapoel Gilboa Galil (2021) ===
On August 5, 2021, Chealey signed with Hapoel Gilboa Galil of the Israeli Basketball Premier League.

=== Return to the Greensboro Swarm (2021–2022) ===
On November 9, 2021, the Greensboro Swarm announced that they had added Chealey to their roster. With Greensboro, he averaged 10.74 points and 5.91 assists per game, while shooting .871 from the free throw line.

=== MKS Dąbrowa Górnicza (2022–2023) ===
On August 4, 2022, he signed with MKS Dąbrowa Górnicza of the Polish Basketball League (PLK). He averaged 14.38 points with 5.44 assists per game while shooting .820 from the free throw line.

=== Hapoel Eliat (2023–2024) ===
On July 22, 2023, he signed with Hapoel Eilat of the Israeli Basketball Premier League.

=== Juventus Utena (2024) ===
On 2 July 2024, Chealey signed with Juventus Utena of the Lithuanian Basketball League (LKL). On October 8, he left the team after suffering multiple season-ending injuries.

== Career statistics ==
Legend
GP	Games played	GS	Games started	MPG	Minutes per game
FG%	Field goal percentage	3P%	3-point field goal percentage	FT%	Free throw percentage
RPG	Rebounds per game	APG	Assists per game	SPG	Steals per game
BPG	Blocks per game	PPG	Points per game	**Bold**	Career high

=== NBA ===
==== Regular season ====
Year	Team	GP	GS	MPG	FG%	3P%	FT%	RPG	APG	SPG	BPG	PPG
2018–19	Charlotte	1	0	8.0	**.333**	–	–	.0	**1.0**	.0	.0	**2.0**
2019–20	Charlotte	**4**	0	**8.3**	.000	.000	**1.000**	.0	.3	**1.0**	.0	.5
Career		5	0	8.2	.100	.000	1.000	.0	.4	.8	.0	.8

=== College ===
Year	Team	GP	GS	MPG	FG%	3P%	FT%	RPG	APG	SPG	BPG	PPG
2013–14	College of Charleston	27	10	20.7	.365	.297	.667	2.0	2.0	.7	**.3**	6.9
2014–15	College of Charleston	33	32	32.5	.402	.306	.758	3.6	3.3	.9	.2	12.4
2015–16	College of Charleston	**35**	33	33.8	**.432**	**.392**	.822	3.5	3.2	**1.0**	.0	17.8
2016–17	College of Charleston	34	**34**	**35.4**	.393	.348	**.858**	**4.6**	**3.6**	.9	.1	**18.0**
Career		129	109	31.1	.404	.347	.805	3.5	3.1	.9	.1	14.2
