= R.B. Stall High School =

Public high school in North Charleston, South Carolina

Coordinates: 32.9226°N 80.0801°W

Location
- 3625 Ashley Phosphate Road; North Charleston, (Charleston County), South Carolina 29418; United States

Information
- Type: Public high school
- Principal: Stephen Larson
- Staff: 120.80 (FTE)
- Enrollment: 2,025 (2023-2024)
- Student to teacher ratio: 16.76
- Colors: Carolina blue and navy
- Nickname: Warriors

R.B. Stall High School is a public high school in North Charleston, South Carolina. It has a Charleston postal address. It is a part of the Charleston County School District (CCSD). At one point Stall High School moved to a new location. It continued using the stadium at the old location until a new CCSD stadium opened. From circa 2016 it has been a "Capturing Kids' Hearts" showcase school. By 2020 the school had an increase in its graduation rate to 75%, when it was previously around 63-64%.

== Notable alumni ==
- Annise Parker (1974), former mayor of Houston, Texas
- Keith Stubbs (1978), comedian
- Tim Scott (1983), U.S. Senator
- Anthony Johnson (1992), NBA player
- Earl Grant (1995), basketball coach for the Boston College Eagles
