= 1996–97 Charleston Cougars men's basketball team =

American college basketball season

1996–97 Charleston Cougars men's basketball

TAAC Regular Season champion TAAC tournament champion

NCAA tournament, second round
- Conference: Trans America Athletic Conference
- East Division

Ranking
- Coaches: No. 21
- AP: No. 16
- Record: 29–3 (16–0 TAAC)
- Head coach: John Kresse (18th season)
- Home arena: John Kresse Arena

1996–97 Trans America Athletic Conference men's basketball standings
	Conf.				Overall
Team	W		L	PCT	W		L	PCT
East
No. 16 College of Charleston†	16	–	0	1.000	29	–	3	.906
Florida International	12	–	4	.750	16	–	13	.552
Florida Atlantic	11	–	5	.688	16	–	11	.593
Campbell	8	–	8	.500	11	–	16	.407
Stetson	5	–	11	.313	9	–	18	.333
Central Florida	4	–	12	.250	7	–	19	.269
West
Samford	11	–	5	.688	19	–	9	.679
Jacksonville State	9	–	7	.563	10	–	17	.370
Southeastern Louisiana	7	–	9	.438	10	–	18	.357
Georgia State	6	–	10	.375	10	–	17	.370
Centenary	6	–	10	.375	9	–	18	.333
Mercer	1	–	15	.063	3	–	23	.115
† 1997 TAAC tournament winner Rankings from AP poll

The 1996–97 College of Charleston Cougars men's basketball team represented the College of Charleston in the 1996–97 NCAA Division I men's basketball season. The Cougars, led by 18th-year head coach John Kresse, played their home games at F. Mitchell Johnson Arena in Charleston, South Carolina as members of the Trans America Athletic Conference.

After finishing the regular season conference schedule unbeaten (16–0), the Cougars would also win the 1997 TAAC tournament to earn an automatic bid to the NCAA tournament as No. 12 seed in the Southeast region. College of Charleston beat No. 5 seed Maryland in the opening round before falling to eventual National champion Arizona in the second round, 73–69. The team set a school record for wins in a season and finished with an overall record of 29–3 as well as a No. 16 ranking in the season’s final AP poll.

The Charleston senior class finished with a four-year record of 101–17.

== Roster ==
1996–97 College of Charleston Cougars men's basketball team
Players
Coaches

Pos.	#	Name	Height	Weight	Year	Previous school	Hometown
C	4	Thaddeous Delaney	6 ft 8 in (2.03 m)	250 lb (113 kg)	Sr
G	20	Jermel President	5 ft 11 in (1.8 m)	—	So	Burke	Charleston, South Carolina
F	21	Stacy Harris	6 ft 4 in (1.93 m)	—	Sr	West Potomac	Alexandria, Virginia
F	23	Sedric Webber	6 ft 6 in (1.98 m)	195 lb (88 kg)	So	W. J. Keenan	Columbia, South Carolina
G	24	Anthony Johnson	6 ft 3 in (1.91 m)	195 lb (88 kg)	RS Sr	R.B. Stall	Charleston, South Carolina
F	42	Rodney Conner	6 ft 7 in (2.01 m)	—	Sr	Orangeburg-Wilkinson	Orangeburg, South Carolina

Head coach

- John Kresse (St. John's)

Assistant coach(es)

Legend

- (C) Team captain
- (S) Suspended
- (I) Ineligible
- (W) Walk-on
- Injured
- Current redshirt

Roster

== Schedule and results ==
Date time, TV	Rank^{#}	Opponent^{#}	Result	Record	Site (attendance) city, state
Regular season
Nov 22, 1996*		at Charleston Southern	W 81–68	1–0	F. Mitchell Johnson Arena (3,068); Charleston, South Carolina
Nov 27, 1996*		vs. Arizona State; Great Alaska Shootout	W 77–68	2–0	Sullivan Arena (8,285); Anchorage Alaska
Nov 29, 1996*		vs. No. 21 Stanford; Great Alaska Shootout	W 82–78	3–0	Sullivan Arena (8,285); Anchorage Alaska
Nov 30, 1996*		vs. No. 8 Kentucky; Great Alaska Shootout	L 65–92	3–1	Sullivan Arena (8,285); Anchorage Alaska
Dec 7, 1996*		The Citadel	W 68–63	4–1	F. Mitchell Johnson Arena (3,622); Charleston, South Carolina
Dec 14, 1996		Presbyterian	W 62–56	5–1	F. Mitchell Johnson Arena (2,741); Charleston, South Carolina
Dec 16, 1996		Elon	W 68–59	6–1 (2–0)	F. Mitchell Johnson Arena (2,432); Charleston, South Carolina
Dec 18, 1996*		at Oklahoma State	L 49–67	6–2	Gallagher-Iba Arena (5,821); Stillwater, Oklahoma
Dec 28, 1996*		Drexel	W 75–65	7–2	F. Mitchell Johnson Arena (3,722); Charleston, South Carolina
Dec 29, 1996*		Northern Illinois	W 71–67 ^{OT}	8–2	F. Mitchell Johnson Arena (2,561); Charleston, South Carolina
Jan 2, 1997		at Mercer	W 88–64	9–2 (1–0)	Porter Gym (683); Macon, Georgia
Jan 4, 1997		at Georgia State	W 88–63	10–2 (2–0)	GSU Sports Arena (1,245); Statesboro, Georgia
Jan 9, 1997		Jacksonville State	W 90–74	11–2 (3–0)	F. Mitchell Johnson Arena (3,482); Charleston, South Carolina
Jan 11, 1997		at Samford	W 79–59	12–2 (4–0)	Seibert Hall (3,588); Birmingham, Alabama
Jan 13, 1997*		at Wofford	W 88–64	13–2	Benjamin Johnson Arena (2,422); Spartanburg, South Carolina
Jan 16, 1997		Florida Atlantic	W 72–64	14–2 (5–0)	F. Mitchell Johnson Arena (3,617); Charleston, South Carolina
Jan 18, 1997		Florida International	W 78–75	15–2 (6–0)	F. Mitchell Johnson Arena (3,692); Charleston, South Carolina
Jan 23, 1997		Campbell	W 77–52	16–2 (7–0)	F. Mitchell Johnson Arena (3,347); Charleston, South Carolina
Jan 30, 1997		at Central Florida	W 87–63	17–2 (8–0)	UCF Arena (1,345); Orlando, Florida
Feb 1, 1997		at Stetson	W 77–56	18–2 (9–0)	Edmunds Center (3,307); DeLand, Florida
Feb 3, 1997		at Campbell	W 97–58	19–2 (10–0)	Carter Gymnasium (788); Buies Creek, North Carolina
Feb 6, 1997		Central Florida	W 90–61	20–2 (11–0)	F. Mitchell Johnson Arena (3,419); Charleston, South Carolina
Feb 8, 1997		Stetson	W 62–44	21–2 (12–0)	F. Mitchell Johnson Arena (3,607); Charleston, South Carolina
Feb 13, 1997	No. 25	at Florida International	W 85–81	22–2 (13–0)	Golden Panther Arena (1,273); Miami, Florida
Feb 15, 1997	No. 25	at Florida Atlantic	W 64–60	23–2 (14–0)	FAU Arena (2,124); Boca Raton, Florida
Feb 20, 1997	No. 22	Southeastern Louisiana	W 81–68	24–2 (15–0)	F. Mitchell Johnson Arena (3,688); Charleston, South Carolina
Feb 22, 1997	No. 22	Centenary	W 94–73	25–2 (16–0)	F. Mitchell Johnson Arena (3,734); Charleston, South Carolina
TAAC tournament
Feb 27, 1997*	(1) No. 20	Centenary; Quarterfinals	W 89–71	26–2	F. Mitchell Johnson Arena (3,255); Charleston, South Carolina
Feb 28, 1997*	(1) No. 20	Southeastern Louisiana; Semifinals	W 93–63	27–2	F. Mitchell Johnson Arena (3,480); Charleston, South Carolina
Mar 1, 1997*	(1) No. 20	Florida International; Championship Game	W 83–73	28–2	F. Mitchell Johnson Arena (3,525); Charleston, South Carolina
NCAA Tournament
Mar 13, 1997*	(12 SE) No. 16	vs. (5 SE) No. 22 Maryland; First Round	W 75–66	29–2	Pyramid Arena (9,000); Memphis, Tennessee
Mar 15, 1997*	(12 SE) No. 16	vs. (4 SE) No. 15 Arizona; Second Round	L 69–73	29–3	Pyramid Arena (11,815); Memphis, Tennessee
*Non-conference game. ^{#}Rankings from AP Poll. (#) Tournament seedings in parentheses. SE=Southeast. All times are in Eastern.

== Awards and honors ==
- Anthony Johnson – TAAC Player of the Year
- John Kresse – TAAC Coach of the Year

== NBA draft ==
Round	Pick	Player	NBA Team
2	39	Anthony Johnson	Sacramento Kings
