= 1997 TAAC men's basketball tournament =

- Classification: Division I
- Season: 1996–97
- Teams: 8
- Site: F. Mitchell Johnson Arena; Charleston, SC
- Champions: College of Charleston (1st title)
- Winning coach: John Kresse (1st title)
- MVP: Anthony Johnson (College of Charleston)
- TAAC men's basketball tournaments

1996–97 Trans America Athletic Conference men's basketball standings
	Conf.				Overall
Team	W		L	PCT	W		L	PCT
East
No. 16 College of Charleston†	16	–	0	1.000	29	–	3	.906
Florida International	12	–	4	.750	16	–	13	.552
Florida Atlantic	11	–	5	.688	16	–	11	.593
Campbell	8	–	8	.500	11	–	16	.407
Stetson	5	–	11	.313	9	–	18	.333
Central Florida	4	–	12	.250	7	–	19	.269
West
Samford	11	–	5	.688	19	–	9	.679
Jacksonville State	9	–	7	.563	10	–	17	.370
Southeastern Louisiana	7	–	9	.438	10	–	18	.357
Georgia State	6	–	10	.375	10	–	17	.370
Centenary	6	–	10	.375	9	–	18	.333
Mercer	1	–	15	.063	3	–	23	.115
† 1997 TAAC tournament winner Rankings from AP poll

The 1997 Trans America Athletic Conference men's basketball tournament (now known as the ASUN men's basketball tournament) was held February 27–March 1 at F. Mitchell Johnson Arena at the College of Charleston in Charleston, South Carolina.

College of Charleston defeated Florida International in the championship game, 83–73, to win their first TAAC/Atlantic Sun men's basketball tournament.

The Cougars, therefore, received the TAAC's automatic bid to the 1997 NCAA tournament, their first automatic bid to the Division I tournament. Charleston defeated Maryland in the First Round before falling to eventual-champion Arizona in the Round of 32.

== Format ==
The 12 teams in the TAAC were separated into two six-team divisions, and the top four eligible teams from each division qualified for the tournament. College of Charleston became eligible for the tournament this year after becoming a full Division I member. However, transitioning members Florida Atlantic and Jacksonville State were not eligible.

== Bracket ==
Quarterfinals; Thursday, February 27
1E	#20 College of Charleston	89
4W	Centenary (LA)	71
2W	SE Louisiana	61
3E	Campbell	55
1W	Samford	60
4E	Stetson	51
2E	Florida International	70
3W	Georgia State	57

Semifinals; Friday, February 28
1E	#20 College of Charleston	93
2W	SE Louisiana	63
1W	Samford	67
2E	Florida International	90

Championship; Saturday, March 1
1E	#20 College of Charleston	83
2E	Florida International	73
