= Real Rob =

American comedy television series

- Genre: Sitcom
- Created by: Rob Schneider
- Starring: Rob Schneider; Patricia Schneider; Jamie Lissow; Miranda Scarlett Schneider
- Theme music composer: Bowie Dinkel; Kelvin Pimont
- Composers: Bowie Dinkel; Kelvin Pimont
- Country of origin: United States
- Original language: English
- No. of seasons: 2
- No. of episodes: 16

Production
- Executive producers: Rob Schneider; Patricia Schneider
- Producer: Joe McDougall
- Camera setup: Single-camera
- Running time: 24–33 minutes
- Production company: From Out of Nowhere Productions

Original release
- Network: Netflix
- Release: December 1, 2015 – September 29, 2017

Real Rob (stylized onscreen as REⱯL ROB) is an American television sitcom created by Rob Schneider. It premiered on December 1, 2015, on Netflix, and follows the everyday life of Schneider, including his real-life wife Patricia and daughter Miranda. On July 27, 2016, the series was renewed for a second season, which premiered on September 29, 2017.

== Cast ==
=== Main ===
- Rob Schneider as himself
- Patricia Schneider as herself, Rob's wife who is of Mexican descent and younger than he is.
- Jamie Lissow as himself, Rob's incompetent assistant.
- Miranda Scarlett Schneider as herself, introduced in the series as the 11-month-old daughter of Rob and Patricia.

=== Co-Starring ===
- Max Amini as Stalker, a guy who watches Rob's every move.
- Andrei Aldochine as Udo, a male stripper whom Patricia hires as their nanny.
- Adam Korson as Andy, Rob's agent.

=== Also Starring ===
- Kym Jackson as Margaret, Jamie's girlfriend who works at a marijuana store.
- Keith Stubbs as Rob's Accountant.

The series guest stars David Spade, Norm Macdonald, Adam Sandler, Michael Madsen, Danny Trejo, and George Lopez.

== Episodes ==
Series overview
Season	Episodes	Originally released
1	8	December 1, 2015
2	8	September 29, 2017

=== Season 1 (2015) ===
No. overall	No. in season	Title	Directed by	Written by	Original release date
1	1	"Pilot"	Rob Schneider	Rob Schneider and Patricia Schneider and Jamie Lissow	December 1, 2015
Rob finds that his assistant Jamie is incompetent and considers firing him, but he discovers that his stalker might be a good replacement. After being rejected for installing a stripper pole, Rob's wife Patricia wants to start a business that involves male dancers.
2	2	"The Penis Episode Part 1"	Rob Schneider	Rob Schneider and Patricia Schneider and Jamie Lissow	December 1, 2015
Patricia wants Rob to have a vasectomy, and signs him up for a consultation. Rob meets up with former SNL colleague Norm Macdonald on what the procedure is like. When he sees that Jamie is stoned, he takes him to the clinic where he has Jamie go through the operation.
3	3	"The Penis Episode Part 2"	Rob Schneider	Rob Schneider and Patricia Schneider and Jamie Lissow	December 1, 2015
After turning down a commercial for a prostate enhancement, Rob makes a cash deal to endorse a bubble tea to be marketed in China and Taiwan. However, the tea turns out to be a Viagra-like supplement, and his face is plastered on a Hollywood billboard.
4	4	"VIP Treatment"	Rob Schneider	Rob Schneider and Patricia Schneider and Jamie Lissow	December 1, 2015
After accidentally hitting a guy with his car, but getting excused and accommodated for by the police, Rob finds himself in more situations where he gets preferential treatment for being a celebrity, which angers Patricia. But not all incidents go his way when a barista later gets offended by his tip and a plumber wants to overcharge him. Patricia orders costumes for her male revue dancers. Rob lands a circus role as a mime but when he imitates an audience member with special needs, he gets decked and watches as David Spade gets preferential treatment at the hospital.
5	5	"Gaying in Shape"	Rob Schneider	Rob Schneider and Patricia Schneider and Jamie Lissow	December 1, 2015
Patricia tells Rob that he is so out of shape, even gay guys would not hit on him. To remedy this, he asks Jamie about his sex appeal to guys, and then joins Udo in working out at the Hollywood Gym where he tries flirt with guys. Upon learning that the venue for Miranda's first birthday party does not serve organic pizza, Rob insists on hosting the party himself, but runs into trouble when he is unable to make a cake, and forgets to hire the mascot.
6	6	"Cleaning House"	Rob Schneider	Rob Schneider and Patricia Schneider and Jamie Lissow	December 1, 2015
Patricia has Rob get rid of his stuff which includes an alleged autographed Beatles album, an issue of Playboy, and sports memorabilia. He must also find a Mexican spiritualist to cleanse their house of bad spirits. Rob consults George Lopez, who at first is insulted he even knows his number, but recommends a shaman that will do the ritual. When the shaman mentions he needs marijuana in order to do the cleansing, Rob has to obtain a medical marijuana license. Rob also tries to get Jamie buy back his "My Sharona" 45 rpm single at the garage sale.
7	7	"What's My Thing?"	Rob Schneider	Rob Schneider and Patricia Schneider and Jamie Lissow	December 1, 2015
After seeing his sitcom idea turn into a radically different concept involving post-apocalyptic zombies and vampires, Rob begins to question what original business he can start. Patricia asks Rob to hire Ryan Gosling for the opening night of her male revue show. Rob gets inspired to start a vitamin health food business.
8	8	"Opening Night"	Rob Schneider	Rob Schneider and Patricia Schneider and Jamie Lissow	December 1, 2015
After quitting the TV show pilot, Rob discovers that his mother and brother had been squandering his fortune, leaving him broke and unable to pay for his health food store or the balance of the payment to hire Ryan Gosling. He and Jamie stash their order of refrigerators and other appliances at an empty Blockbuster store, and find a homeless man to impersonate Gosling for Patricia's show.

=== Season 2 (2017) ===
No. overall	No. in season	Title	Directed by	Written by	Original release date
9	1	"Acupuncture & Spring Rolls"	Rob Schneider	Rob Schneider and Patricia Schneider and Jamie Lissow	September 29, 2017
Jamie hurts his back while moving furniture with Rob into the new house. Patricia makes more money doing a commercial than Rob doing voice work on 'Starfish Wars'.
10	2	"Priorities"	Rob Schneider	Rob Schneider and Patricia Schneider and Jamie Lissow	September 29, 2017
Patricia insists that the new house is sprayed for spiders but Rob is more interested in an infrared sauna. Together they search for the right preschool to enroll Miranda in.
11	3	"Best Play Date Ever"	Rob Schneider	Rob Schneider and Patricia Schneider and Jamie Lissow	September 29, 2017
Rob and Jamie try to get rid of some of Rob's old stuff. Patricia wants Miranda to make friends at preschool, so she organizes the best play date ever. Rob is more interested in befriending another parent: Paul McCartney's guitarist Dusty Lane.
12	4	"Zen What Happens"	Rob Schneider	Rob Schneider and Patricia Schneider and Jamie Lissow	September 29, 2017
On his way to Vegas for a gig, Rob gets stuck at Bob Hope Airport where Danny Trejo introduces him to being Zen. Meanwhile, Patricia is working on her own career and moving exorcise equipment into the house.
13	5	"Coffee Business"	Rob Schneider	Rob Schneider and Patricia Schneider and Jamie Lissow	September 29, 2017
Patricia has a callback for an audition on a steamy daytime soap. Rob is introduced to cat poop coffee by his stalker.
14	6	"Authentic Self"	Rob Schneider	Rob Schneider and Patricia Schneider and Jamie Lissow	September 29, 2017
Jealous of Patricia's success as an actress, Rob decides to take a serious part in a no-budget indie picture. He also takes her place at Miranda's school giving an 'excitement' speech.
15	7	"Who Loves You"	Rob Schneider	Rob Schneider and Patricia Schneider and Jamie Lissow	September 29, 2017
Patricia is promoting "Fuego y Pasión" in Mexico and Rob goes along to 'support' her. Jamie is going camping with Allison over the weekend.
16	8	"Now Boarding"	Rob Schneider	Rob Schneider and Patricia Schneider and Jamie Lissow	September 29, 2017
Rob is in training for a martial arts picture. Patricia wants to take a break after the finale of her soap. Jamie is celebrating his engagement with Allison.

== Reception ==
"Real Rob" was met with a largely negative response from critics. The show held a score of 36 on Metacritic based on 5 critic reviews, and a 0% rating on Rotten Tomatoes based on 8 critic reviews.

On February 20, 2016, Internet personality Arin Hanson voiced his frustrations regarding Real Rob on his daily Let's Play webseries Game Grumps. Hanson felt the show's main issue was that Schneider's character was both unlikable and unrelatable, going as far as to say that "it's a show with no demographic." While Hanson's overall feelings toward the show were negative, he stated that he felt compelled to keep watching and also praised the performance of Patricia Schneider, citing her as a legitimately funny presence. Schneider eventually saw Hanson's rant and later appeared as a special guest on the show, along with Patricia, on May 16, 2016.
