= Max Amini =

Iranian-American comedian (born 1981)

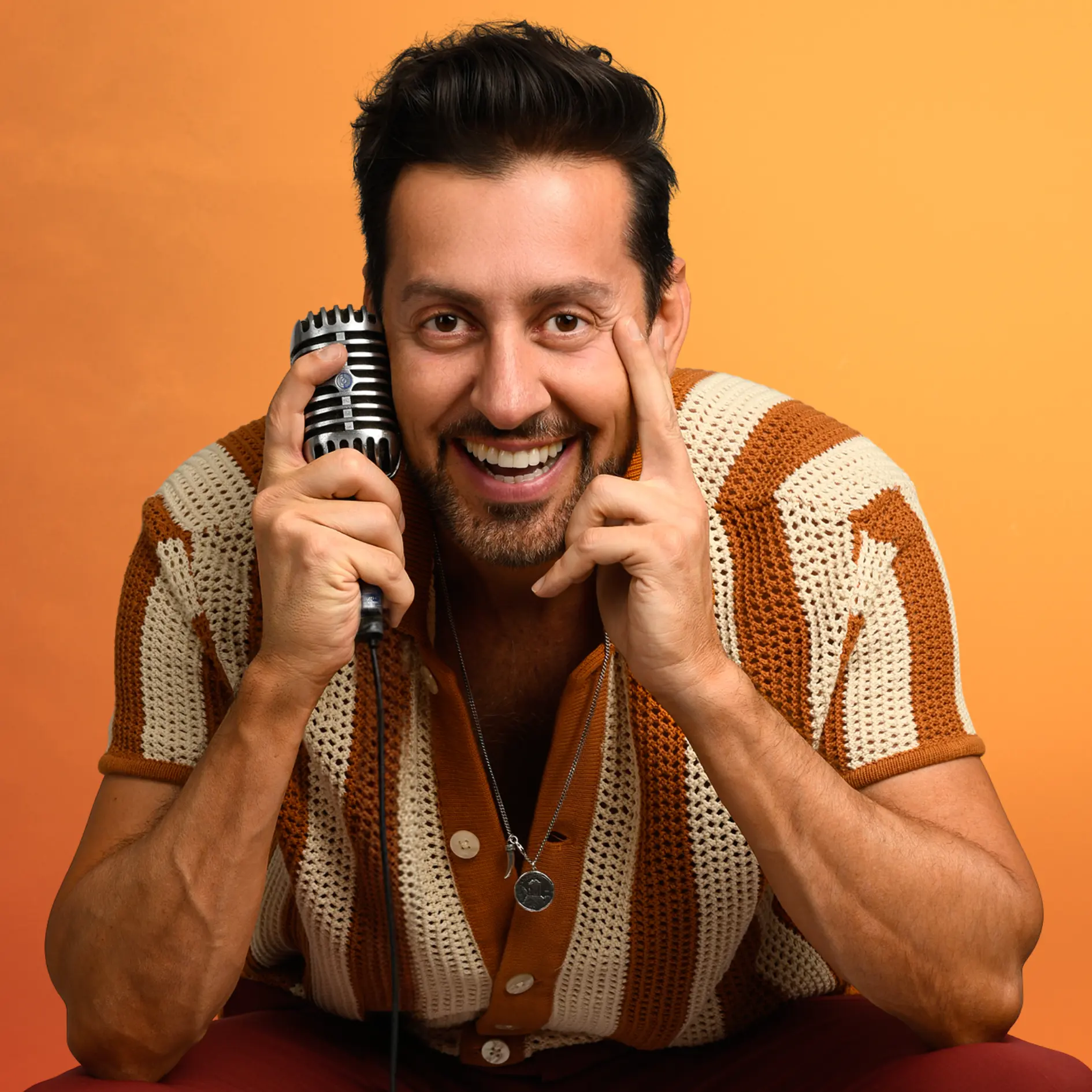
- Amini in June 2021
- Born: Max Amini; September 20, 1981 (age 45); Tucson, Arizona, U.S.
- Education: UCLA

Comedy career
- Years active: 2002–present
- Medium: Stand-up, television, film
- Genres: Observational comedy, Satire, Physical Comedy
- Subjects: Relationships, Family, Iranian culture
- Website: Max Amini

Max Amini (born September 20, 1981) is an Iranian-American comedian, actor, producer and director. He is known primarily as a world touring stand-up comedian, and has appeared on shows such as NBC's Heroes, Netflix's Real Rob with Rob Schneider, and Comedy Central's Mind of Mencia. On an episode of Spike's Car Radio Podcast, Jerry Seinfeld named Max Amini one of the top comedians to watch. Max established his production company, Abstraction Media in 2010, and has sold projects to networks such as Voice Of America, Discovery, and more. Other projects include directing a Netflix original stand-up special, Enissa Amani: Ehrenwort, and the feature film, James The Second, set to release in 2022. Amini has performed stand up in both English and Persian.

== Early life and education ==
Max Amini was born in Tucson, Arizona, to Iranian parents who had immigrated after the 1979 revolution. His father is from Isfahan and his mother is from Tabriz.

At the age of eight, his parents moved their family back to Iran, where he was raised until the age of 17.

He went to high school in Washington, DC, and then moved to California and graduated from the School of Theater, Film and Television at UCLA in 2004.

== Stand-up comedy ==
Amini began his stand-up comedy career in 2002 at the LA Improv, where he developed a stand-up comedy tour named "Exotic Imports," and has since performed worldwide. Amini has multiple hour-long comedy specials and continues to tour, performing regularly at the Hollywood Laugh Factory. He currently performs in his own shows worldwide, with tours spanning Europe, the Middle East and Asia.

In 2015, he released a 2-hour stand-up comedy special on DVD called "Max Amini: Authentically Absurd," directed by Rob Schneider.

== Acting ==
Amini is an actor with film and TV credits, including NBC's Heroes, Netflix's Real Rob with Rob Schneider, Comedy Central's Mind of Mencia, and his leading role in the movie Beer Pong Saved My Life, released in 2010. He also played a small role in the movie “Shirin in Love”.

== Selected filmography ==
Year	Title	Role	Comments
2003	Luis	Ice-cream man	TV Series
2003	Shakespeare's Merchant	Benicio	
2006	Heroes	Cabbie	TV series, 2 episodes
2007-2008	Mind of Mencia	Ahmad, Dave Dater, Joel, Chief Wizard	TV series, 7 episodes
2010	Beer Pong Saved My Life	Eric	
2012-2013	Geo's Pizza	The Armenian, Masked man	TV series, 5 episodes
2015	Max Amini: Authentically Absurd	Self	Stand-up special, DVD
2015-2017	Real Rob	Stalker, Stalker Steve	TV series, 9 episodes
2023	The Unseen Prince: Reza Pahlavi	Director, Host	
2024	Bad Advice	Dahvie	TV series, 1 episode
