= Anthony Johnson (basketball) =

American basketball player (born 1974)

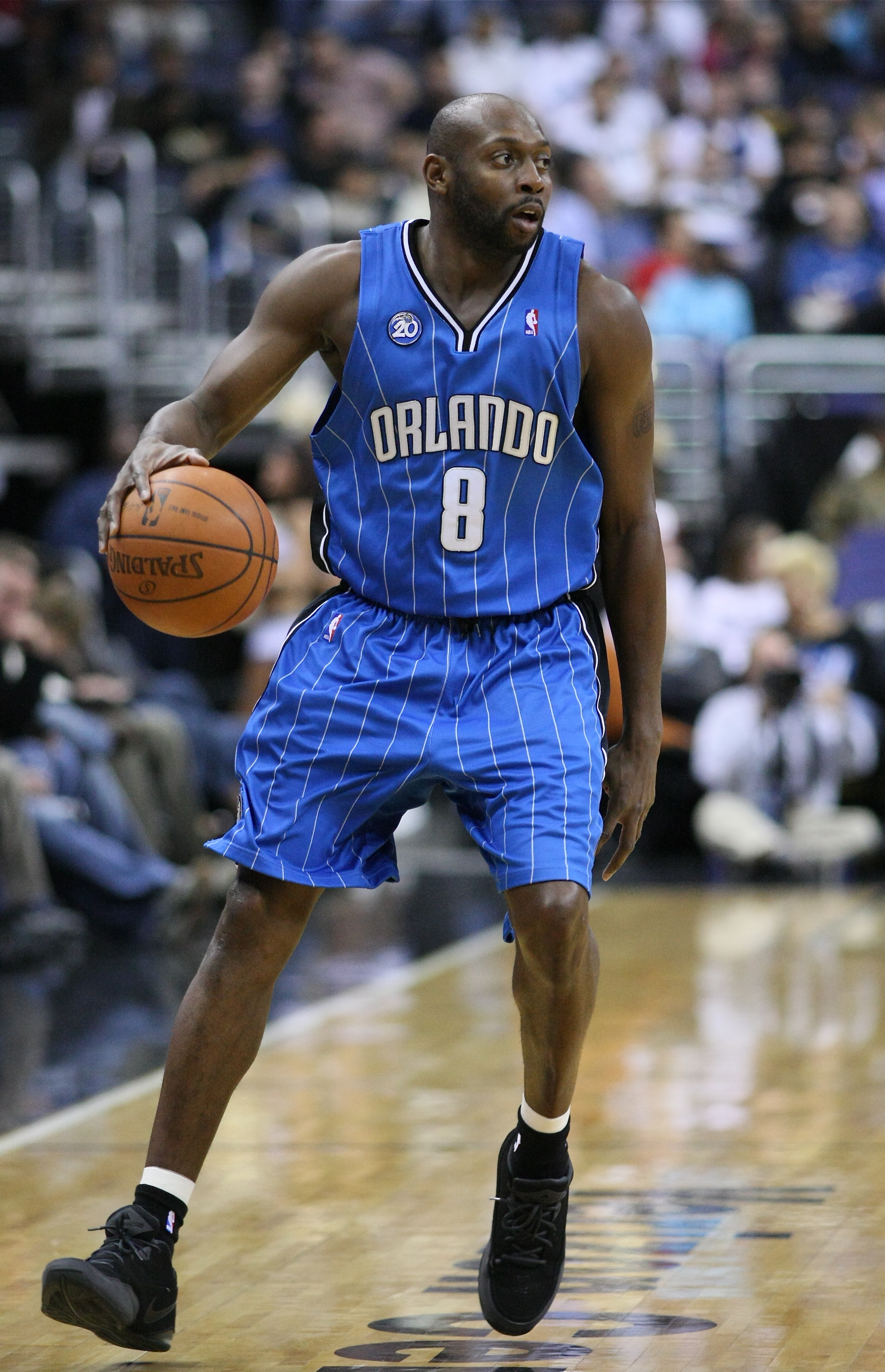

Personal information
- Born: October 2, 1974 (age 51) Charleston, South Carolina, U.S.
- Listed height: 6 ft 3 in (1.91 m)
- Listed weight: 195 lb (88 kg)

Career information
- High school: R. B. Stall (Charleston, South Carolina)
- College: Charleston (1992–1997)
- NBA draft: 1997: 2nd round, 39th overall pick
- Drafted by: Sacramento Kings
- Playing career: 1997–2010
- Position: Point guard / shooting guard
- Number: 10, 24, 8, 2, 5

Career history
- 1997–1998: Sacramento Kings
- 1999–2000: Atlanta Hawks
- 2000: Orlando Magic
- 2000–2001: Atlanta Hawks
- 2001–2002: Cleveland Cavaliers
- 2001–2002: Mobile Revelers
- 2002–2003: New Jersey Nets
- 2003–2006: Indiana Pacers
- 2006–2007: Dallas Mavericks
- 2007–2008: Atlanta Hawks
- 2008: Sacramento Kings
- 2008–2010: Orlando Magic

Career highlights
- TAAC Player of the Year (1997); First-team All-TAAC (1997); TAAC Tournament MVP (1997)
- Stats at NBA.com
- Stats at Basketball Reference

Anthony Mark Johnson (born October 2, 1974) is an American former professional basketball player who last played with the Orlando Magic of the National Basketball Association (NBA). At 6 feet 3 inches (1.91 m), he played the point guard position. He found success in pro basketball, becoming the first NBA D-League player to participate in an NBA Finals. A native of Charleston, South Carolina, Johnson played college basketball for the Charleston Cougars and was selected in the 1997 NBA draft.

== Early life ==
Johnson attended R.B. Stall High School in North Charleston, South Carolina, and played both basketball and football for the school. In 1992, his senior year, Johnson led his team to the South Carolina AAA football championship and received a basketball scholarship from the College of Charleston, where his older brother Steven was a standout years earlier.

== College career ==
Johnson made his collegiate debut for the Charleston Cougars during the 1992–93 season, averaging 3.1 points and 1.1 assists per game as a freshman off the bench. He did not play for the 1993–94 Cougars due to injury. Johnson improved during his 1995–96 junior season, averaging 11.3 points and 6.7 rebounds across 29 starts. He also led the Trans America Athletic Conference with 193 total assists.

Johnson had a breakthrough senior season with the 1996–97 Cougars. He was named TAAC Player of the Year after averaging 13.1 points per game and leading the league with 7.2 assists per game. He led the TAAC in total assists for the second year in a row with 229, which also ranked fourth nationally. Johnson was named TAAC Tournament MVP after leading the no. 20 nationally ranked Cougars to victory through the 1997 TAAC Tournament.

In the First Round of the 1997 NCAA Tournament, Johnson scored 17 points and dished out 9 assists to lead the 12-seed Cougars to a 75–66 upset victory over the 5-seed Maryland Terrapins. This was the first and (as of 2026) only NCAA Tournament victory for the Charleston Cougars.

Johnson still holds Charleston's record for most career assists (520), and most assists per season (229 in 1996–97). Johnson's #24 was officially retired by the school and hung in the rafters of TD Arena, and he was inducted into Charleston's Athletic Hall of Fame in 2013.

== NBA career ==
=== Sacramento Kings (1997–98) ===
After graduation Johnson entered the 1997 NBA Draft, and was picked 40th overall, 11th in the second round, by the Sacramento Kings. He was the first player in College of Charleston history to be selected in the NBA Draft. In his rookie season, Johnson started in a career-high 62 games, averaging 7.5 points, 2.2 rebounds, and 4.3 assists per game. After finishing the season with a 27–55 record, the Kings released Johnson from the roster and he entered free agency for the first time.

=== Atlanta Hawks (1999–2000) ===
On January 21, 1999, Johnson signed with the Atlanta Hawks. He only started two games, and averaged 5.0 points and 2.2 assists per game across 49 games in the 1998–99 season. Johnson made his postseason debut during the 1999 NBA playoffs, where he averaged 2.7 points per game across nine games. Despite beating the Detroit Pistons in the First Round, the Hawks fell to the New York Knicks in the Second Round. During the first half of the 1999–2000 season, Johnson played in 38 games for the Hawks, averaging 2.8 points and 1.3 assists per game with only two starts.

=== Orlando Magic (2000) ===
On February 24, 2000, the Hawks traded Johnson to the Orlando Magic for a second-round draft pick in 2004 (Viktor Sanikidze). Across 18 games to end the season, Johnson averaged 3.4 points per game.

=== Atlanta Hawks, Second Stint (2000–01) ===
On August 21, 2000, Johnson signed as a free agent with the Atlanta Hawks for the second time. He averaged 2.6 points and 1.4 assists across the first 25 games of the 2000–01 season.

=== Cleveland Cavaliers (2001) ===
On January 2, 2001, Johnson was traded with Jim Jackson and Larry Robinson to the Cleveland Cavaliers in exchange for Brevin Knight. He averaged 2.4 points and 1.6 assists across the last 28 games of the 2000–01 season.

On December 7, 2001, Johnson signed with the NBDL team Mobile Revelers and played there for 15 games, averaging 11.9 points per game.

=== New Jersey Nets (2002–03) ===
On January 7, 2002, Johnson signed a 10-day contract with the New Jersey Nets, before signing a contract for the rest of the 2001–02 season. He averaged 2.8 points and 1.4 assists across 34 games with the Nets that season. Johnson played in 19 games during the 2002 NBA Playoffs, averaging 2.6 points per game. After winning the Eastern Conference Final, Johnson made his NBA Finals debut against the Los Angeles Lakers, who defeated the Nets in four games.

October 25, 2002, Johnson signed another one-year contract with the New Jersey Nets. He averaged 4.1 points and 1.3 assists per game across 66 games in the 2002–03 season. Johnson shot .548 across the 2003 NBA Playoffs, where the Nets returned to the Finals and lost to the San Antonio Spurs in six games.

=== Indiana Pacers (2003–06) ===
On July 24, 2003, Johnson signed a one-year contract with the Indiana Pacers. During the 2003–04 season Johnson had a career resurgence, averaging nearly 22 minutes per game and scoring 6.5 points per game. During the 2004 NBA Playoffs, Johnson averaged 4.6 points, 2.1 assists, and 2.1 rebounds, as the Pacers fell to the Detroit Pistons in the Eastern Conference Final. Prior to the 2004–05 season, the longtime NBA journeyman earned his first long-term contract, a four-year deal with the Pacers.

Johnson received a suspension from the NBA due to his actions in the infamous Pacers–Pistons brawl, known as the "Malice at the Palace", which broke out at The Palace of Auburn Hills near the end of a November 19, 2004 game between the two teams. He was suspended for five games and fined $122,222 by the league. Teammates Ron Artest, Stephen Jackson, and Jermaine O'Neal received longer suspensions, resulting in increased playing time for Johnson. The Pacers' starting point guard, Jamaal Tinsley, also missed extended periods of time due to injury, allowing Johnson to start games regularly for the first time since 1998. Across the 2004–05 season, Johnson started in 36 games, averaging career-highs with 8.4 points, 2.8 rebounds, and 4.8 assists per game. During the 2005 NBA Playoffs, Johnson averaged 7.0 points, 5.1 assists, and 2.9 rebounds, as the Pacers fell to the Pistons in the Eastern Conference Semifinal.

During the 2005–06 season, Johnson played in 75 games for the Pacers (53 starts), and set a new career-high averaging 9.2 points per game. In the 2006 NBA Playoffs, Johnson scored a career-high 40 points against the New Jersey Nets in Game 6 of First Round. Despite his heroics, the Pacers lost 96–90, and lost the series 4–2 to the Nets.

=== Dallas Mavericks (2006–07) ===
On July 24, 2006, Johnson was traded to the Dallas Mavericks in exchange for guard Darrell Armstrong, and forwards Josh Powell and Rawle Marshall. With the Mavericks, Johnson returned to a backup role, playing 40 games with zero starts while averaging 3.8 points and 2.0 assists during the 2006–07 season.

=== Atlanta Hawks, Third Stint (2007–08) ===
On February 22, 2007, Johnson was traded back to the Atlanta Hawks in exchange for a second round draft choice. It was Johnson's third stint with the team. He averaged 7.5 points and 4.6 assists per game off of the bench for the rest of the 2006–07 season. Johnson started in 41 out of 42 games during the first half of the 2007–08 season with the Hawks, averaging 6.7 points per game and tying his career-bests with 4.8 assists and 1.0 steals per game.

=== Sacramento Kings, Second Stint (2008) ===
On February 16, 2008, the Sacramento Kings acquired Johnson along with Shelden Williams, Tyronn Lue, and Lorenzen Wright in exchange for Mike Bibby. He had the best field goal percentage (.455) and best three point percentage (.500) of his career, but only averaged 3.9 points and 2.2 assists per game to close out the final 27 games of the 2007–08 season.

=== Orlando Magic, Second Stint (2008–10) ===
On July 15, 2008, Johnson signed a two-year contract worth $3.8 million with the Orlando Magic. Johnson played in a career-high 80 games during the 2008–09 season, averaging 5.3 points and 2.5 assists per game off of the bench. He played in 19 games for the Magic during the 2009 NBA Playoffs, averaging 4.3 points and 2.1 assists. He led the team with seven assists In Game 2 of the Eastern Conference Semifinals against the Boston Celtics, and again with four assists in Game 2 of the Eastern Conference Finals against the Cleveland Cavaliers. Despite his strong play, Johnson did not appear in the 2009 NBA Finals, and the Magic lost to the Los Angeles Lakers in five games.

In his final season, 2009–10, Johnson played in 31 games, averaging 4.2 points and 2.0 assists per game off the bench. He made one appearance in the 2010 NBA Playoffs, putting up two points and two assists in a 114–71 win over the Atlanta Hawks in Game 1 of the Eastern Conference Semifinal. Johnson's two-year contract expired at the conclusion of the 2010 postseason, making him a free agent. He retired shortly thereafter.

== NBA career statistics ==
Legend
GP	Games played	GS	Games started	MPG	Minutes per game
FG%	Field goal percentage	3P%	3-point field goal percentage	FT%	Free throw percentage
RPG	Rebounds per game	APG	Assists per game	SPG	Steals per game
BPG	Blocks per game	PPG	Points per game	**Bold**	Career high

=== Regular season ===
Year	Team	GP	GS	MPG	FG%	3P%	FT%	RPG	APG	SPG	BPG	PPG
1997–98	Sacramento	77	**62**	**29.4**	.371	.328	.727	2.2	4.3	.8	.1	7.5
1998–99	Atlanta	49	2	18.1	.404	.263	.695	1.5	2.2	.7	.1	5.0
1999–00	Atlanta	38	2	11.1	.350	.167	.792	1.0	1.6	.6	.1	2.4
1999–00	Orlando	18	4	11.9	.426	.200	.600	.7	.7	.6	.1	3.4
2000–01	Atlanta	25	0	11.2	.366	.000	.706	.9	1.4	.7	.2	2.6
2000–01	Cleveland	28	0	8.3	.333	**.500**	.688	.8	1.6	.2	.0	2.4
2001–02	New Jersey	34	0	10.8	.411	.333	.640	.9	1.4	.9	.0	2.8
2002–03	New Jersey	66	2	12.8	.446	.371	.689	1.2	1.3	.6	.1	4.1
2003–04	Indiana	73	7	21.9	.406	.336	.798	1.8	2.8	.9	.1	6.2
2004–05	Indiana	63	36	27.7	.445	.380	.752	**2.8**	**4.8**	.9	.2	8.4
2005–06	Indiana	75	53	26.4	.443	.329	.752	2.2	4.3	.8	**.3**	**9.2**
2006–07	Dallas	40	0	14.1	.411	.379	.724	1.2	2.0	.4	.0	3.8
2006–07	Atlanta	27	17	27.4	.416	.318	.781	2.0	4.6	.6	.1	7.5
2007–08	Atlanta	42	41	26.7	.431	.429	.813	2.3	**4.8**	**1.0**	.2	6.7
2007–08	Sacramento	27	11	15.2	**.455**	**.500**	.818	1.4	2.2	.4	.0	3.9
2008–09	Orlando	**80**	12	18.5	.404	.391	.753	1.8	2.5	.6	.1	5.3
2009–10	Orlando	31	0	13.1	.441	.333	**.950**	1.5	2.0	.4	.0	4.2
Career		793	249	19.6	.414	.356	.745	1.7	2.9	.7	.1	5.6

=== Playoffs ===
Year	Team	GP	GS	MPG	FG%	3P%	FT%	RPG	APG	SPG	BPG	PPG
1999	Atlanta	9	0	12.3	.276	**.500**	.700	1.0	1.1	.1	.1	2.7
2002	New Jersey	**19**	0	8.5	.377	.100	.818	.7	1.1	.3	.0	2.6
2003	New Jersey	17	0	7.2	**.548**	**.500**	**.833**	.7	1.1	.1	.0	2.5
2004	Indiana	16	0	20.8	.362	.300	.773	2.1	2.1	.8	.3	4.6
2005	Indiana	13	4	24.3	.351	.348	.806	2.9	5.1	**1.0**	**.4**	7.0
2006	Indiana	6	**6**	**40.3**	.517	.400	.667	**5.0**	**5.2**	**1.0**	.0	**20.0**
2009	Orlando	**19**	1	14.7	.376	.300	.500	1.4	2.1	.6	.0	4.3
2010	Orlando	1	0	5.0	.500	.000	.000	.0	2.0	.0	.0	2.0
Career		100	11	15.7	.404	.321	.721	1.6	2.2	.5	.1	4.8

=== College ===
Year	Team	GP	GS	MPG	FG%	3P%	FT%	RPG	APG	SPG	BPG	PPG
1992–93	College of Charleston	27	0	10.1	.397	.333	.712	1.6	1.1	0.6	0.1	3.1
1993–94	College of Charleston	Injured										
1994–95	College of Charleston	29	1	17.0	.391	.400	.647	1.8	2.3	0.9	0.1	3.4
1995–96	College of Charleston	29	29	32.6	.459	**.406**	.670	3.2	6.7	**1.6**	0.2	11.3
1996–97	College of Charleston	**32**	**32**	**34.3**	**.505**	.405	**.794**	**3.5**	**7.2**	**1.6**	**0.3**	**13.9**
Career		117	62	24.0	.466	.404	.725	2.6	4.4	1.2	0.2	8.2
