= 2006 NBA playoffs =

Postseason tournament

Tournament details
- Dates: April 22–June 20, 2006
- Season: 2005–06
- Teams: 16

Final positions
- Champions: Miami Heat (1st title)
- Runners-up: Dallas Mavericks
- Semifinalists: Detroit Pistons; Phoenix Suns

Tournament statistics
- Scoring leader(s): Dwyane Wade (Heat) (28.4 PPG)

Awards
- MVP: Dwyane Wade (Heat)

The 2006 NBA playoffs was the postseason tournament of the National Basketball Association's 2005–06 season. The tournament concluded with the Eastern Conference champion Miami Heat defeating the Western Conference champion Dallas Mavericks 4 games to 2 in the NBA Finals. Dwyane Wade was named NBA Finals MVP.

The San Antonio Spurs were the defending champions, but lost in the conference semifinals to the Mavericks in seven games.

== Overview ==
This season was the last time that the Sacramento Kings made the playoffs until 2023. The Kings held the longest playoff drought in NBA playoff history at 16 years. With the MLB's Seattle Mariners qualifying for the playoffs in 2022, the Kings held the title for the longest active playoff drought among the four major North American sports leagues until 2023.

The Los Angeles Clippers made the playoffs for the first time since 1997, and advanced to the second round for the first time since 1976, when they were the Buffalo Braves. They came within one game of making the conference finals for the first time, but lost Game 7 to the Suns.

The Phoenix Suns became the eighth team to win a playoff series despite trailing 3–1 with their first round victory over the Los Angeles Lakers. They lost to the Dallas Mavericks in the Western Conference finals.

The Denver Nuggets also appeared in the playoffs as the 3rd seed in the Western Conference despite a 44–38 record (due to winning their division). However, they lost to the Los Angeles Clippers in the first round, and the NBA changed how division winners are seeded starting the following season.

2006 was the playoff debut of LeBron James, who helped the Cleveland Cavaliers eke out 1–point OT victories over the Washington Wizards in Games 5 and 6 of their first-round series to advance. It was the Cavaliers first playoff appearance since 1998, and they earned their first playoff series win since 1993. The Cavaliers played against the two-time defending Eastern Conference champion Detroit Pistons in the next round. After being routed in Game 1 and losing Game 2 by 6, the Cavs won the next three matches in a row, and they were 1 game away from beating the Pistons. However, Detroit recovered and won the last 2, in order to take the series in 7. The Pistons and Cavaliers met in the next year's Playoffs, and the Cavaliers won that series in six games.

This season also marked the first time that two 60–win teams met before the conference finals, due to the seeding format. The San Antonio Spurs and the Dallas Mavericks played against each other in the Western Conference semifinals. The Mavericks won the series in seven games, marking the first time the Mavericks beat the Spurs in a playoff series.

This year's NBA Finals also featured a number of firsts

- Both NBA Finalists made their first NBA Finals: The Dallas Mavericks and the Miami Heat, for the first time since 1971.
- Neither the Lakers nor the Spurs represented the Western Conference, for the first time since 1998.
- For the first time since 1998, the NBA Finals did not feature Tim Duncan or Kobe Bryant (although Kobe's ex–teammate, Shaquille O'Neal, returned to the Finals for the fifth time in seven seasons)
- For the first time since 2001, neither the Nets or the Pistons represented the Eastern Conference (coincidentally, these two teams were eliminated by the Miami Heat en route to their first Finals appearance)
- The Mavericks became the first team since 1977 to lose the NBA Finals despite leading 2–0. They also became the first team in NBA History to win the first two games, build a double digit lead in game 3, lose game 3, and the rest of the series.
- The Miami Heat won their first NBA Championship despite losing the first two games, the third team in NBA History to do so.
  - Prior to Game 6, Pat Riley motivated his players to pack "one shirt, one suit, one tie." His effort paid off, and the Heat won that game, giving Riley his fifth NBA Championship as a head coach. He also avenged his previous NBA Finals loss in 1994, when his New York Knicks lost to the Houston Rockets despite leading 3–2.

The 2006 NBA Playoffs also featured several lasts.

- Game 6 of the Spurs–Kings series was the last NBA Playoff game to be played at ARCO Arena.
- The last time division winners were automatically granted a top three seed in the NBA Playoffs.
- The Indiana Pacers and Memphis Grizzlies' last playoff appearance until 2011.
- The last time the Chicago Bulls lost a first–round series until 2009.
- The last time the Los Angeles Clippers won a playoff series until 2012 (and earned home court advantage until 2013).
- The last time Shaquille O'Neal played in the NBA Finals.

== Format ==
With the addition of the 30th NBA franchise, the Charlotte Bobcats, in 2005, the NBA realigned its divisions. Each conference had three divisions of five teams each, and at this point in time, the winner of each division was guaranteed a top-three playoff seed regardless of whether the team had one of the top-eight records in its conference. However, the division champion was not guaranteed home-court advantage; a division-leading team could be seeded second or third but face a lower seed (that did not win its division) with a better record, and the lower seed would have home-court advantage.

This was illustrated in the first round here when the 44-win Denver Nuggets won the Northwest Division and had the third seed, yet did not have home-court advantage against the sixth-seeded, 47-win Los Angeles Clippers. The Clippers had played the Memphis Grizzlies a week before the playoffs to determine the fifth and sixth seed. The loser of the game would face Denver, whereas the winner would face fourth-seeded Dallas, who had the second-best record in the conference. It was speculated that the Clippers lost on purpose to play Denver in the first round. Starting in the 2007 playoffs, being a division winner did not guarantee a top-3 playoff seed.

== Playoff qualifying ==
=== Eastern Conference ===
==== Best record in NBA ====
The Detroit Pistons clinched the best record in the NBA, earning home-court advantage throughout the playoffs. However, when the Pistons lost to the Miami Heat in the Eastern Conference finals, home-court advantage in the NBA Finals went to the Western Conference champion Dallas Mavericks, which had a better record than the Heat.

==== Clinched a playoff berth ====
The following teams clinched a playoff berth in the East:

1. Detroit Pistons (64–18) (clinched Central division)
2. Miami Heat (52–30) (clinched Southeast division)
3. New Jersey Nets (49–33) (clinched Atlantic division)
4. Cleveland Cavaliers (50–32)
5. Washington Wizards (42–40)
6. Indiana Pacers (41–41, 2–2 head-to-head vs. CHI, 6–10 record vs. Central Division)
7. Chicago Bulls (41–41, 2–2 head-to-head vs. IND, 4–12 record vs. Central Division)
8. Milwaukee Bucks (40–42)

=== Western Conference ===
==== Best record in conference ====
The San Antonio Spurs clinched the best record in the Western Conference, and had home-court advantage throughout the Western Conference playoffs. However, when they lost to the Dallas Mavericks in the Conference semifinals, Dallas had home court advantage in the Western Conference finals.

==== Clinched a playoff berth ====
The following teams clinched a playoff berth in the West:

1. San Antonio Spurs (63–19) (clinched Southwest division)
2. Phoenix Suns (54–28) (clinched Pacific division)
3. Denver Nuggets (44–38) (clinched Northwest division)
4. Dallas Mavericks (60–22)
5. Memphis Grizzlies (49–33)
6. Los Angeles Clippers (47–35)
7. Los Angeles Lakers (45–37)
8. Sacramento Kings (44–38)

== Bracket ==
First Round | Conference semifinals
E1 | Detroit* | 4
E8 | Milwaukee | 1
E1 | Detroit* | 4
E4 | Cleveland | 3
E4 | Cleveland | 4
E5 | Washington | 2
Eastern Conference
E3 | New Jersey* | 4
E6 | Indiana | 2
E3 | New Jersey* | 1
E2 | Miami* | 4
E2 | Miami* | 4
E7 | Chicago | 2
W1 | San Antonio* | 4
W8 | Sacramento | 2
W1 | San Antonio* | 3
W4 | Dallas | 4
W4 | Dallas | 4
W5 | Memphis | 0
Western Conference
W3 | Denver* | 1
W6 | LA Clippers | 4
W6 | LA Clippers | 3
W2 | Phoenix* | 4
W2 | Phoenix* | 4
W7 | LA Lakers | 3

Conference finals
E1 | Detroit* | 2
E2 | Miami* | 4
W4 | Dallas | 4
W2 | Phoenix* | 2

NBA Finals
E2 | Miami* | 4
W4 | Dallas | 2

- * Division winner
- Bold Series winner
- Italic Team with home-court advantage

== TV coverage ==
First and second-round games were televised on ABC, TNT, ESPN, ESPN2, and NBA TV in the United States and on TSN, The Score, and Raptors NBA TV in Canada; some games were also televised on local or regional TV networks. The Eastern Conference finals aired exclusively on ESPN/ABC, and the Western Conference finals aired exclusively on TNT; TSN and The Score split coverage of the conference finals. The NBA Finals aired exclusively on ABC in the U.S. and on TSN in Canada.

ESPN offered "Full Circle" broadcasts for the opening game of the Bulls–Heat series, with ESPN2 carrying an "above the rim" camera feed, ESPNews carrying in-game analysis, ESPN360 carrying a statistics-focused feed, and additional supplemental coverage on ESPN Radio and ESPN.com.

== First round ==
All times are in Eastern Daylight Time (UTC−4)

=== Eastern Conference first round ===
==== (1) Detroit Pistons vs. (8) Milwaukee Bucks ====
TNT

April 23
5:30 pm

Recap

Milwaukee Bucks 74, Detroit Pistons 92
Scoring by quarter: 19–19, 18–24, 19–25, 18–24
| Pts: Charlie Bell 13; Rebs: Jamaal Magloire 9 Asts: Ford, Bogut 3 each | Pts: Rasheed Wallace 22; Rebs: Ben Wallace 17; Asts: Chauncey Billups 7 |
Detroit leads series, 1–0

The Palace of Auburn Hills, Auburn Hills, Michigan
Attendance: 22,076
Referees: Eddie Rush, David Jones,
Bill Spooner, Bennie Adams

NBA TV

April 26
7:30 pm

Recap

Milwaukee Bucks 98, Detroit Pistons 109
Scoring by quarter: 23–32, 25–29, 27–31, 23–17
| Pts: Michael Redd 29; Rebs: Andrew Bogut 13; Asts: Andrew Bogut 4 | Pts: Tayshaun Prince 22; Rebs: Ben Wallace 11; Asts: Richard Hamilton 8 |
Detroit leads series, 2–0

The Palace of Auburn Hills, Auburn Hills, Michigan
Attendance: 22,076
Referees: Tony Brothers, Don Garretson, Derrick Stafford

ESPN

April 29
8:00 pm

Recap

Detroit Pistons 104, Milwaukee Bucks 124
Scoring by quarter: 27–30, 27–31, 20–29, 30–34
| Pts: Chauncey Billups 26; Rebs: Antonio McDyess 8 Asts: Chauncey Billups 6 | Pts: Michael Redd 40; Rebs: three players 7 each Asts: T. J. Ford 15 |
Detroit leads series, 2–1

Bradley Center, Milwaukee, Wisconsin
Attendance: 18,717
Referees: Dan Crawford, Joe Forte, Scott Wall

NBA TV

May 1
7:30 pm

Recap

Detroit Pistons 109, Milwaukee Bucks 99
Scoring by quarter: 27–20, 24–25, 23–31, 35–23
| Pts: Chauncey Billups 34; Rebs: Antonio McDyess 11; Asts: Tayshaun Prince 7 | Pts: Michael Redd 33; Rebs: Jamaal Magloire 12; Asts: Andrew Bogut 6 |
Detroit leads series, 3–1

Bradley Center, Milwaukee, Wisconsin
Attendance: 16,296
Referees: Bernie Fryer, Tom Washington, Mark Wunderlich

TNT

May 3
6:00 pm

Recap

Milwaukee Bucks 93, Detroit Pistons 122
Scoring by quarter: 23–39, 26–23, 17–35, 27–25
| Pts: Michael Redd 23; Rebs: Michael Redd 9 Asts: T. J. Ford 6 | Pts: Richard Hamilton 40; Rebs: Ben Wallace 14; Asts: Chauncey Billups 8 |
Detroit wins series, 4–1

The Palace of Auburn Hills, Auburn Hills, Michigan
Attendance: 22,076
Referees: Sean Corbin, Ken Mauer, Bennett Salvatore

Regular-season series
Detroit won 3–1 in the regular-season series

November 26, 2005

Recap

Detroit Pistons 85, Milwaukee Bucks 76

Bradley Center, Milwaukee, Wisconsin

January 25, 2006

Recap

Milwaukee Bucks 102, Detroit Pistons 106 (OT)

The Palace of Auburn Hills, Auburn Hills, Michigan

March 31, 2006

Recap

Milwaukee Bucks 105, Detroit Pistons 112

The Palace of Auburn Hills, Auburn Hills, Michigan

April 17, 2006

Recap

Detroit Pistons 93, Milwaukee Bucks 113

Bradley Center, Milwaukee, Wisconsin

This was the fourth playoff meeting between these two teams, with the Pistons winning the first three meetings.

Previous playoff series
Detroit leads 3–0 in all-time playoff series

1976

Detroit Pistons 2, Milwaukee Bucks 1

1976 Western Conference First Round

1989

Detroit Pistons 4, Milwaukee Bucks 0

1989 Eastern Conference semifinals

2004

Detroit Pistons 4, Milwaukee Bucks 1

2004 Eastern Conference First Round

- This is the most recent playoff series between the Pistons & Bucks until 2019.

==== (2) Miami Heat vs. (7) Chicago Bulls ====
ESPN

April 22
8:00 pm

Recap

Chicago Bulls 106, Miami Heat 111
Scoring by quarter: 24–26, 27–37, 31–24, 24–24
| Pts: Ben Gordon 35; Rebs: Andrés Nocioni 16; Asts: Kirk Hinrich 8 | Pts: Dwyane Wade 30; Rebs: Shaquille O'Neal 16; Asts: Dwyane Wade 11 |
Miami leads series, 1–0

American Airlines Arena, Miami
Attendance: 20,288
Referees: Tony Brothers, Joe Crawford, Joe DeRosa

TNT

April 24
8:00 pm

Recap

Chicago Bulls 108, Miami Heat 115
Scoring by quarter: 26–33, 31–35, 19–27, 32–20
| Pts: Andrés Nocioni 35; Rebs: Tyson Chandler 9 Asts: Kirk Hinrich 7 | Pts: O'Neal, Williams 22 each Rebs: Antoine Walker 10; Asts: Dwyane Wade 7 |
Miami leads series, 2–0

American Airlines Arena, Miami
Attendance: 20,214
Referees: Mike Callahan, Dan Crawford, Courtney Kirkland

TNT

April 27
8:00 pm

Recap

Miami Heat 90, Chicago Bulls 109
Scoring by quarter: 23–31, 19–17, 29–39, 19–22
| Pts: Dwyane Wade 26; Rebs: Udonis Haslem 10; Asts: Wade, Williams 4 each | Pts: Ben Gordon 24; Rebs: Andrés Nocioni 9 Asts: Kirk Hinrich 11 |
Miami leads series, 2–1

United Center, Chicago
Attendance: 22,133
Referees: Bob Delaney, Bernie Fryer, Mark Wunderlich

ABC

April 30
1:00 pm

Recap

Miami Heat 87, Chicago Bulls 93
Scoring by quarter: 23–21, 17–23, 19–21, 28–28
| Pts: Antoine Walker 21; Rebs: Udonis Haslem 9 Asts: Dwyane Wade 10 | Pts: Andrés Nocioni 24; Rebs: Andrés Nocioni 7 Asts: Kirk Hinrich 9 |
Series tied, 2–2

United Center, Chicago
Attendance: 22,361
Referees: Ron Garretson, Monty McCutchen, Greg Willard

TNT

May 2
8:00 pm

Recap

Chicago Bulls 78, Miami Heat 92
Scoring by quarter: 19–25, 19–15, 23–21, 17–31
| Pts: Andrés Nocioni 23; Rebs: Andrés Nocioni 10; Asts: Kirk Hinrich 5 | Pts: Dwyane Wade 28; Rebs: Shaquille O'Neal 10; Asts: Dwyane Wade 5 |
Miami leads series, 3–2

American Airlines Arena, Miami
Attendance: 20,287
Referees: Dick Bavetta, Scott Foster, Jack Nies

TNT

May 4
8:00 pm

Recap

Miami Heat 113, Chicago Bulls 96
Scoring by quarter: 29–19, 26–22, 29–28, 29–27
| Pts: Shaquille O'Neal 30; Rebs: Shaquille O'Neal 20; Asts: Dwyane Wade 6 | Pts: Kirk Hinrich 23; Rebs: Luol Deng 6 Asts: Kirk Hinrich 6 |
Miami wins series, 4–2

United Center, Chicago
Attendance: 22,584
Referees: Steve Javie, Tom Washington, Jess Kersey

Regular-season series
Miami won 2–1 in the regular-season series

November 26, 2005

Recap

Miami Heat 100, Chicago Bulls 97

United Center, Chicago, Illinois

March 18, 2006

Recap

Miami Heat 85, Chicago Bulls 84

United Center, Chicago, Illinois

April 16, 2006

Recap

Chicago Bulls 117, Miami Heat 93

American Airlines Arena, Miami

This was the fourth playoff meeting between these two teams, with the Bulls winning the first three meetings.

Previous playoff series
Chicago leads 3–0 in all-time playoff series

1992

Chicago Bulls 3, Miami Heat 0

1992 Eastern Conference First Round

1996

Chicago Bulls 3, Miami Heat 0

1996 Eastern Conference First Round

1997

Chicago Bulls 4, Miami Heat 1

1997 Eastern Conference finals

==== (3) New Jersey Nets vs. (6) Indiana Pacers ====
TNT

April 23
12:30 pm

Recap

Indiana Pacers 90, New Jersey Nets 88
Scoring by quarter: 30–24, 20–22, 14–19, 26–23
| Pts: Stephen Jackson 18; Rebs: Jeff Foster 9 Asts: Anthony Johnson 6 | Pts: Vince Carter 31; Rebs: Vince Carter 13; Asts: Jason Kidd 8 |
Indiana leads series, 1–0

Continental Airlines Arena, East Rutherford, New Jersey
Attendance: 18,752
Referees: Bennett Salvatore, Scott Wall, Tom Washington

NBA TV

April 25
7:30 pm

Recap

Indiana Pacers 75, New Jersey Nets 90
Scoring by quarter: 22–26, 14–18, 17–29, 22–17
| Pts: Anthony Johnson 16; Rebs: Jeff Foster 9 Asts: Johnson, Jones 4 each | Pts: Vince Carter 33; Rebs: Jason Kidd 11; Asts: Jason Kidd 13 |
Series tied, 1–1

Continental Airlines Arena, East Rutherford, New Jersey
Attendance: 18,472
Referees: Steve Javie, Ken Mauer, Violet Palmer

NBA TV

April 27
7:30 pm

Recap

New Jersey Nets 95, Indiana Pacers 107
Scoring by quarter: 27–22, 28–29, 15–27, 25–29
| Pts: Carter, Jefferson 25 each Rebs: Collins, Kidd 6 each Asts: Richard Jefferson 7 | Pts: Jermaine O'Neal 37; Rebs: Jermaine O'Neal 15; Asts: Anthony Johnson 8 |
Indiana leads series, 2–1

Conseco Fieldhouse, Indianapolis
Attendance: 14,706
Referees: Dan Crawford, Joe DeRosa, Jess Kersey

TNT

April 29
3:00 pm

Recap

New Jersey Nets 97, Indiana Pacers 88
Scoring by quarter: 24–15, 26–22, 26–30, 21–31
| Pts: Vince Carter 28; Rebs: Nenad Krstić 8 Asts: Jason Kidd 8 | Pts: Jermaine O'Neal 22; Rebs: Danny Granger 8 Asts: three players 4 each |
Series tied, 2–2

Conseco Fieldhouse, Indianapolis
Attendance: 16,401
Referees: Bob Delaney, Bernie Fryer, Mark Wunderlich

NBA TV

May 2
7:00 pm

Recap

Indiana Pacers 86, New Jersey Nets 92
Scoring by quarter: 25–28, 21–21, 19–23, 21–20
| Pts: Jermaine O'Neal 19; Rebs: Danny Granger 12; Asts: Stephen Jackson 7 | Pts: Vince Carter 34; Rebs: Vince Carter 15; Asts: Jason Kidd 15 |
New Jersey leads series, 3–2

Continental Airlines Arena, East Rutherford, New Jersey
Attendance: 18,804
Referees: Mike Callahan, Monty McCutchen, Eddie F. Rush

NBA TV

May 4
7:30 pm

Recap

New Jersey Nets 96, Indiana Pacers 90
Scoring by quarter: 21–26, 20–15, 32–28, 23–21
| Pts: Richard Jefferson 30; Rebs: Jason Kidd 12; Asts: Jason Kidd 11 | Pts: Anthony Johnson 40; Rebs: Jermaine O'Neal 6 Asts: Anthony Johnson 5 |
New Jersey wins series, 4–2

Conseco Fieldhouse, Indianapolis
Attendance: 16,586
Referees: Jimmy Clark, Ron Garretson, Jack Nies

Regular-season series
Indiana won 2–1 in the regular-season series

November 11, 2005

Recap

New Jersey Nets 90, Indiana Pacers 102

Conseco Fieldhouse, Indianapolis

January 16, 2006

Recap

Indiana Pacers 92, New Jersey Nets 97

Continental Airlines Arena, East Rutherford, New Jersey

February 26, 2006

Recap

Indiana Pacers 101, New Jersey Nets 91

Continental Airlines Arena, East Rutherford, New Jersey

This was the second playoff meeting between these two teams, with the Nets winning the first meeting.

Previous playoff series
New Jersey leads 1–0 in all-time playoff series

2002

Indiana Pacers 2, New Jersey Nets 3

2002 Eastern Conference First Round

==== (4) Cleveland Cavaliers vs. (5) Washington Wizards ====
ABC

April 22
3:00 pm

Recap

Washington Wizards 86, Cleveland Cavaliers 97
Scoring by quarter: 20–31, 16–19, 21–24, 29–23
| Pts: Gilbert Arenas 26; Rebs: Antawn Jamison 7 Asts: Antonio Daniels 6 | Pts: LeBron James 32; Rebs: LeBron James 11; Asts: LeBron James 11 |
Cleveland leads series, 1–0

Quicken Loans Arena, Cleveland, Ohio
Attendance: 20,562
Referees: Steve Javie, Derrick Stafford, Marc Davis

TNT

April 25
7:00 pm

Recap

Washington Wizards 89, Cleveland Cavaliers 84
Scoring by quarter: 21–23, 16–15, 24–25, 28–21
| Pts: Gilbert Arenas 30; Rebs: Caron Butler 9 Asts: Gilbert Arenas 6 | Pts: LeBron James 26; Rebs: Drew Gooden 16; Asts: Eric Snow 4 |
Series tied, 1–1

Quicken Loans Arena, Cleveland, Ohio
Attendance: 20,562
Referees: David Jones, Eddie F. Rush, Bill Spooner

ESPN

April 28
8:00 pm

Recap

Cleveland Cavaliers 97, Washington Wizards 96
Scoring by quarter: 19–26, 31–32, 21–13, 26–25
| Pts: LeBron James 41; Rebs: Gooden, Ilgauskas 8 each Asts: James, Snow 3 each | Pts: Gilbert Arenas 34; Rebs: Caron Butler 11; Asts: Daniels, Jamison 3 each |
Cleveland leads series, 2–1

Verizon Center, Washington, D.C.
Attendance: 20,173
Referees: Ron Garretson, Monty McCutchen, Greg Willard

TNT

April 30
8:00 pm

Recap

Cleveland Cavaliers 96, Washington Wizards 106
Scoring by quarter: 27–26, 30–20, 15–26, 24–34
| Pts: LeBron James 38; Rebs: Donyell Marshall 11; Asts: LeBron James 5 | Pts: Gilbert Arenas 34; Rebs: Jared Jeffries 11; Asts: Gilbert Arenas 6 |
Series tied, 2–2

Verizon Center, Washington, D.C.
Attendance: 20,173
Referees: Dick Bavetta, Mike Callahan, James Capers

TNT

May 3
8:30 pm

Recap

Washington Wizards 120, Cleveland Cavaliers 121 (OT)
Scoring by quarter: 27–25, 24–27, 30–33, 26–22, Overtime: 13–14
| Pts: Gilbert Arenas 44; Rebs: Caron Butler 11; Asts: Antonio Daniels 7 | Pts: LeBron James 45; Rebs: Drew Gooden 11; Asts: LeBron James 6 |
Cleveland leads series, 3–2

Quicken Loans Arena, Cleveland, Ohio
Attendance: 20,562
Referees: Joe Forte, Bernie Fryer, Mark Wunderlich

ESPN

May 5
8:00 pm

Recap

Cleveland Cavaliers 114, Washington Wizards 113 (OT)
Scoring by quarter: 17–24, 31–25, 27–27, 32–31, Overtime: 7–6
| Pts: LeBron James 32; Rebs: Anderson Varejão 10; Asts: Larry Hughes 12 | Pts: Gilbert Arenas 36; Rebs: Caron Butler 20; Asts: Gilbert Arenas 11 |
Cleveland wins series, 4–2

Verizon Center, Washington, D.C.
Attendance: 20,173
Referees: Tony Brothers, Dan Crawford, Ken Mauer

- In Game 3, LeBron James hit the game-winner over Michael Ruffin with 5.7 seconds left, and in Game 5, he hit another game-winner from the baseline with 0.9 seconds left.
- In Game 6, Gilbert Arenas forces overtime with a three from 32 feet with 2.3 seconds left, and in overtime, Damon Jones hit the series-winning shot with 4.8 seconds left.

Regular-season series
Washington won 3–1 in the regular-season series

November 15, 2005

Recap

Washington Wizards 99, Cleveland Cavaliers 114

Quicken Loans Arena, Cleveland, Ohio

February 10, 2006

Recap

Cleveland Cavaliers 89, Washington Wizards 101

Verizon Center, Washington, D.C.

February 24, 2006

Recap

Washington Wizards 102, Cleveland Cavaliers 94

Quicken Loans Arena, Cleveland, Ohio

April 16, 2006

Recap

Cleveland Cavaliers 92, Washington Wizards 104

Verizon Center, Washington, D.C.

This was the third playoff meeting between these two teams, with each team winning one series apiece.

Previous playoff series
Tied 1–1 in all-time playoff series

1976

Cleveland Cavaliers 4, Washington Bullets 3

1976 Eastern Conference semifinals

1977

Cleveland Cavaliers 1, Washington Bullets 2

1977 Eastern Conference First Round

=== Western Conference first round ===
==== (1) San Antonio Spurs vs. (8) Sacramento Kings ====
ESPN

April 22
5:30 pm

Recap

Sacramento Kings 88, San Antonio Spurs 122
Scoring by quarter: 24–32, 15–41, 28–21, 21–28
| Pts: Mike Bibby 17; Rebs: Shareef Abdur-Rahim 9 Asts: Ron Artest 4 | Pts: Tony Parker 25; Rebs: Nazr Mohammed 17; Asts: Brent Barry 6 |
San Antonio leads series, 1–0

AT&T Center, San Antonio
Attendance: 18,797
Referees: Mike Callahan, Dan Crawford, Monty McCutchen

TNT

April 25
10:00 pm

Recap

Sacramento Kings 119, San Antonio Spurs 128 (OT)
Scoring by quarter: 30–23, 26–28, 26–31, 27–27, Overtime: 10–19
| Pts: Bonzi Wells 28; Rebs: Bonzi Wells 12; Asts: Mike Bibby 6 | Pts: Manu Ginóbili 32; Rebs: Tim Duncan 13; Asts: Tony Parker 10 |
San Antonio leads series, 2–0

AT&T Center, San Antonio
Attendance: 18,797
Referees: Dick Bavetta, Joe Forte, Bill Kennedy

ESPN2

April 28
9:30 pm

Recap

San Antonio Spurs 93, Sacramento Kings 94
Scoring by quarter: 20–22, 21–25, 23–21, 29–26
| Pts: Tim Duncan 29; Rebs: Tim Duncan 12; Asts: Tony Parker 6 | Pts: Mike Bibby 25; Rebs: Bonzi Wells 14; Asts: Mike Bibby 8 |
San Antonio leads series, 2–1

ARCO Arena, Sacramento, California
Attendance: 17,317
Referees: Sean Corbin, Ken Mauer, Bennett Salvatore

TNT

April 30
10:30 pm

Recap

San Antonio Spurs 84, Sacramento Kings 102
Scoring by quarter: 24–26, 19–28, 21–21, 20–27
| Pts: Tony Parker 22; Rebs: Tim Duncan 8 Asts: Bruce Bowen 3 | Pts: Bonzi Wells 25; Rebs: Bonzi Wells 17; Asts: Mike Bibby 7 |
Series tied, 2–2

ARCO Arena, Sacramento, California
Attendance: 17,317
Referees: Jimmy Clark, Tim Donaghy, Eddie F. Rush

NBA TV

May 2
9:30 pm

Recap

Sacramento Kings 98, San Antonio Spurs 109
Scoring by quarter: 19–21, 27–22, 22–37, 30–29
| Pts: Bonzi Wells 38; Rebs: Bonzi Wells 12; Asts: three players 4 each | Pts: Manu Ginóbili 27; Rebs: Duncan, Ginóbili 9 each Asts: Tim Duncan 5 |
San Antonio leads series, 3–2

AT&T Center, San Antonio
Attendance: 18,797
Referees: James Capers, Joe Crawford, Derrick Stafford

ESPN

May 5
10:30 pm

Recap

San Antonio Spurs 105, Sacramento Kings 83
Scoring by quarter: 22–20, 23–18, 33–24, 27–21
| Pts: Tony Parker 31; Rebs: Robert Horry 7 Asts: Manu Ginóbili 5 | Pts: Mike Bibby 19; Rebs: Bonzi Wells 11; Asts: Ron Artest 4 |
San Antonio wins series, 4–2

ARCO Arena, Sacramento, California
Attendance: 17,317
Referees: Bob Delaney, Scott Foster, Bernie Fryer

- In Game 2, Brent Barry hit a wild three-pointer with four seconds left to force overtime.
- In Game 3, Kevin Martin hit the game-winning lay-up at the buzzer.
- Game 6 was the final playoff game played at the Arco Arena. Additionally, it was the Kings final playoff game until 2023, as they would miss the playoffs every year from 2007-2022.

Regular-season series
San Antonio won 2–1 in the regular-season series

November 21, 2005

Recap

San Antonio Spurs 96, Sacramento Kings 93

ARCO Arena, Sacramento, California

December 17, 2005

Recap

Sacramento Kings 89, San Antonio Spurs 90

SBC Center, San Antonio

April 5, 2006

Recap

Sacramento Kings 97, San Antonio Spurs 87

AT&T Center, San Antonio

This was the first playoff meeting between the Kings and the Spurs.

==== (2) Phoenix Suns vs. (7) Los Angeles Lakers ====
ABC

April 23
3:00 pm

Recap

Los Angeles Lakers 102, Phoenix Suns 107
Scoring by quarter: 29–39, 21–19, 25–17, 27–32
| Pts: Kobe Bryant 22; Rebs: Lamar Odom 14; Asts: Kobe Bryant 5 | Pts: Tim Thomas 22; Rebs: Tim Thomas 15; Asts: Steve Nash 10 |
Phoenix leads series, 1–0

US Airways Center, Phoenix, Arizona
Attendance: 18,422
Referees: Jimmy Clark, Bernie Fryer, Bill Kennedy

TNT

April 26
10:30 pm

Recap

Los Angeles Lakers 99, Phoenix Suns 93
Scoring by quarter: 24–22, 29–16, 21–29, 25–26
| Pts: Kobe Bryant 29; Rebs: Kobe Bryant 10; Asts: Bryant, Odom 5 each | Pts: Steve Nash 29; Rebs: Marion, Thomas 9 each Asts: Steve Nash 9 |
Series tied, 1–1

US Airways Center, Phoenix, Arizona
Attendance: 18,422
Referees: Joe Crawford, Jack Nies, Michael Smith

ESPN

April 28
10:30 pm

Recap

Phoenix Suns 92, Los Angeles Lakers 99
Scoring by quarter: 27–31, 17–18, 30–28, 18–22
| Pts: Shawn Marion 20; Rebs: Marion, Nash 7 each Asts: Steve Nash 11 | Pts: Smush Parker 18; Rebs: Lamar Odom 17; Asts: Kobe Bryant 7 |
LA Lakers lead series, 2–1

Staples Center, Los Angeles
Attendance: 18,997
Referees: Tim Donaghy, Eddie F. Rush, Bill Spooner

ABC

April 30
3:30 pm

Recap

Phoenix Suns 98, Los Angeles Lakers 99 (OT)
Scoring by quarter: 26–25, 15–16, 26–23, 23–26, Overtime: 8–9
| Pts: Steve Nash 22; Rebs: Shawn Marion 12; Asts: Steve Nash 11 | Pts: Lamar Odom 25; Rebs: Kwame Brown 10; Asts: Kobe Bryant 8 |
LA Lakers lead series, 3–1

Staples Center, Los Angeles
Attendance: 18,997
Referees: Sean Corbin, Ken Mauer, Bennett Salvatore

TNT

May 2
10:30 pm

Recap

Los Angeles Lakers 97, Phoenix Suns 114
Scoring by quarter: 25–27, 22–29, 21–28, 29–30
| Pts: Kobe Bryant 29; Rebs: Lamar Odom 15; Asts: Lamar Odom 6 | Pts: Boris Diaw 25; Rebs: Boris Diaw 10; Asts: Boris Diaw 9 |
LA Lakers lead series, 3–2

US Airways Center, Phoenix, Arizona
Attendance: 18,422
Referees: Ron Garretson, Greg Willard, Leon Wood

TNT

May 4
10:30 pm

Recap

Phoenix Suns 126, Los Angeles Lakers 118 (OT)
Scoring by quarter: 30–37, 30–20, 28–28, 17–20, Overtime: 21–13
| Pts: Steve Nash 32; Rebs: Shawn Marion 12; Asts: Steve Nash 13 | Pts: Kobe Bryant 50; Rebs: Lamar Odom 11; Asts: Lamar Odom 9 |
Series tied, 3–3

Staples Center, Los Angeles
Attendance: 18,997
Referees: Dick Bavetta, Joe DeRosa, Derrick Stafford

TNT

May 6
9:00 pm

Recap

Los Angeles Lakers 90, Phoenix Suns 121
Scoring by quarter: 15–32, 30–28, 20–30, 25–31
| Pts: Kobe Bryant 24; Rebs: Sasha Vujačić 6 Asts: Smush Parker 4 | Pts: Leandro Barbosa 26; Rebs: Shawn Marion 10; Asts: Diaw, Nash 9 each |
Phoenix wins series, 4–3

US Airways Center, Phoenix, Arizona
Attendance: 18,422
Referees: Mike Callahan, Joe Forte, Steve Javie

- In Game 4, Kobe Bryant hit both a lay-up with 0.7 seconds left to force overtime, and the game-winning jump shot at the buzzer in overtime.
- In Game 6, Tim Thomas hit a 3-pointer with 6.3 seconds left to force overtime.
- The Suns became the eighth team in NBA history to overcome a 3–1 series deficit.
- This was the first playoff series a Phil Jackson-coached team lost after taking a series lead, prior to this his record was 44–0.

Regular-season series
Phoenix won 3–1 in the regular-season series

November 3, 2005

Recap

Phoenix Suns 122, Los Angeles Lakers 112

Staples Center, Los Angeles

January 20, 2006

Recap

Los Angeles Lakers 93, Phoenix Suns 106

US Airways Center, Phoenix, Arizona

April 7, 2006

Recap

Los Angeles Lakers 96, Phoenix Suns 107

US Airways Center, Phoenix, Arizona

April 16, 2006

Recap

Phoenix Suns 89, Los Angeles Lakers 109

Staples Center, Los Angeles

This was the tenth playoff meeting between these two teams, with the Lakers winning seven of the first nine meetings.

Previous playoff series
Los Angeles leads 7–2 in all-time playoff series

1970

Los Angeles Lakers 4, Phoenix Suns 3

1970 Western Division semifinals

1980

Los Angeles Lakers 4, Phoenix Suns 1

1980 Western Conference semifinals

1982

Los Angeles Lakers 4, Phoenix Suns 0

1982 Western Conference semifinals

1984

Los Angeles Lakers 4, Phoenix Suns 2

1984 Western Conference finals

1985

Los Angeles Lakers 3, Phoenix Suns 0

1985 Western Conference First Round

1989

Los Angeles Lakers 4, Phoenix Suns 0

1989 Western Conference finals

1990

Los Angeles Lakers 1, Phoenix Suns 4

1990 Western Conference semifinals

1993

Los Angeles Lakers 2, Phoenix Suns 3

1993 Western Conference First Round

2000

Los Angeles Lakers 4, Phoenix Suns 1

2000 Western Conference semifinals

==== (3) Denver Nuggets vs. (6) Los Angeles Clippers ====
ESPN

April 22
10:30 pm

Recap

Denver Nuggets 87, Los Angeles Clippers 89
Scoring by quarter: 26–31, 19–23, 21–22, 21–13
| Pts: Anthony, Miller 25 each Rebs: Marcus Camby 10; Asts: Andre Miller 6 | Pts: Elton Brand 21; Rebs: Chris Kaman 13; Asts: Sam Cassell 7 |
LA Clippers lead series, 1–0

Staples Center, Los Angeles
Attendance: 19,162
Referees: Ron Garretson, Rodney Mott, Greg Willard

TNT

April 24
10:30 pm

Recap

Denver Nuggets 87, Los Angeles Clippers 98
Scoring by quarter: 13–32, 21–24, 25–19, 28–23
| Pts: Anthony, Camby 16 each Rebs: Marcus Camby 14; Asts: Andre Miller 6 | Pts: Cuttino Mobley 21; Rebs: Elton Brand 11; Asts: Sam Cassell 11 |
LA Clippers lead series, 2–0

Staples Center, Los Angeles
Attendance: 18,794
Referees: Joe Crawford, Jack Nies, Michael Smith

TNT

April 27
10:30 pm

Recap

Los Angeles Clippers 87, Denver Nuggets 94
Scoring by quarter: 13–24, 29–21, 28–25, 17–24
| Pts: Corey Maggette 23; Rebs: Brand, Livingston 8 each Asts: Brand, Livingston 4 each | Pts: Carmelo Anthony 24; Rebs: Marcus Camby 14; Asts: Andre Miller 7 |
LA Clippers lead series, 2–1

Pepsi Center, Denver, Colorado
Attendance: 19,099
Referees: Dick Bavetta, Jimmy Clark, Leon Wood

ESPN

April 29
10:30 pm

Recap

Los Angeles Clippers 100, Denver Nuggets 86
Scoring by quarter: 24–21, 32–24, 22–19, 22–22
| Pts: Corey Maggette 19; Rebs: Elton Brand 10; Asts: Shaun Livingston 6 | Pts: Carmelo Anthony 17; Rebs: Carmelo Anthony 11; Asts: Andre Miller 9 |
LA Clippers lead series, 3–1

Pepsi Center, Denver, Colorado
Attendance: 19,099
Referees: Joe DeRosa, Steve Javie, Jess Kersey

TNT

May 1
10:30 pm

Recap

Denver Nuggets 83, Los Angeles Clippers 101
Scoring by quarter: 23–21, 17–25, 17–25, 26–30
| Pts: Carmelo Anthony 23; Rebs: Marcus Camby 11; Asts: Andre Miller 8 | Pts: Maggette, Mobley 23 each Rebs: Elton Brand 13; Asts: Shaun Livingston 14 |
LA Clippers win series, 4–1

Staples Center, Los Angeles
Attendance: 18,648
Referees: Tony Brothers, Dan Crawford, Bill Spooner

Regular-season series
Los Angeles won 3–1 in the regular-season series

November 25, 2005

Recap

Los Angeles Clippers 95, Denver Nuggets 105

Pepsi Center, Denver, Colorado

January 27, 2006

Recap

Los Angeles Clippers 105, Denver Nuggets 87

Pepsi Center, Denver, Colorado

January 28, 2006

Recap

Denver Nuggets 79, Los Angeles Clippers 112

Staples Center, Los Angeles

April 4, 2006

Recap

Denver Nuggets 109, Los Angeles Clippers 111

Staples Center, Los Angeles

This was the first playoff meeting between the Nuggets and the Clippers. For the Clippers franchise, it was their first playoff series win in three decades, since the old Buffalo Braves defeated the Philadelphia 76ers in the first round back in 1976.

==== (4) Dallas Mavericks vs. (5) Memphis Grizzlies ====
TNT

April 23
8:00 pm

Recap

Memphis Grizzlies 93, Dallas Mavericks 103
Scoring by quarter: 22–28, 29–32, 27–23, 15–20
| Pts: Pau Gasol 24; Rebs: Jake Tsakalidis 8 Asts: Gasol, Jackson 4 each | Pts: Dirk Nowitzki 31; Rebs: Erick Dampier 12; Asts: Jason Terry 4 |
Dallas leads series, 1–0

American Airlines Center, Dallas
Attendance: 20,340
Referees: Dick Bavetta, Sean Corbin, Joe Forte

TNT

April 26
8:00 pm

Recap

Memphis Grizzlies 79, Dallas Mavericks 94
Scoring by quarter: 31–32, 12–24, 13–20, 23–18
| Pts: Pau Gasol 16; Rebs: Pau Gasol 7 Asts: Pau Gasol 5 | Pts: Dirk Nowitzki 31; Rebs: three players 6 each Asts: Jason Terry 9 |
Dallas leads series, 2–0

American Airlines Center, Dallas
Attendance: 20,612
Referees: James Capers, Bennett Salvatore, Tom Washington

TNT

April 29
5:30 pm

Recap

Dallas Mavericks 94, Memphis Grizzlies 89 (OT)
Scoring by quarter: 17–23, 21–23, 22–15, 16–15, Overtime: 18–13
| Pts: Dirk Nowitzki 36; Rebs: three players 9 each Asts: Dirk Nowitzki 5 | Pts: Chucky Atkins 20; Rebs: Lorenzen Wright 10; Asts: Eddie Jones 5 |
Dallas leads series, 3–0

FedExForum, Memphis, Tennessee
Attendance: 17,871
Referees: Tony Brothers, Joe Crawford, Derrick Stafford

TNT

May 1
8:00 pm

Recap

Dallas Mavericks 102, Memphis Grizzlies 76
Scoring by quarter: 26–23, 22–16, 31–22, 23–15
| Pts: Dirk Nowitzki 27; Rebs: Josh Howard 9 Asts: Stackhouse, Terry 5 each | Pts: Pau Gasol 25; Rebs: Shane Battier 7 Asts: Chucky Atkins 4 |
Dallas wins series, 4–0

FedExForum, Memphis, Tennessee
Attendance: 15,104
Referees: Bob Delaney, Steve Javie, David Jones

- In Game 3, Dirk Nowitzki hit the game-tying 3 with 15.7 seconds left to force overtime.

Regular-season series
Dallas won 3–1 in the regular-season series

November 26, 2005

Recap

Memphis Grizzlies 112, Dallas Mavericks 92

American Airlines Center, Dallas

December 9, 2005

Recap

Dallas Mavericks 90, Memphis Grizzlies 83

FedExForum, Memphis, Tennessee

February 1, 2006

Recap

Dallas Mavericks 81, Memphis Grizzlies 80

FedExForum, Memphis, Tennessee

February 23, 2006

Recap

Memphis Grizzlies 87, Dallas Mavericks 97

American Airlines Center, Dallas

This was the first playoff meeting between the Mavericks and the Grizzlies.

== Conference semifinals ==
=== Eastern Conference semifinals ===
==== (1) Detroit Pistons vs. (4) Cleveland Cavaliers ====
ABC

May 7
3:30 pm

Recap

Cleveland Cavaliers 86, Detroit Pistons 113
Scoring by quarter: 16–26, 32–43, 15–25, 23–19
| Pts: LeBron James 22; Rebs: Anderson Varejão 8 Asts: James, Murray 4 each | Pts: Tayshaun Prince 24; Rebs: Ben Wallace 11; Asts: Chauncey Billups 10 |
Detroit leads series, 1–0

The Palace of Auburn Hills, Auburn Hills, Michigan
Attendance: 22,076
Referees: James Capers, Joe Crawford, Bill Spooner

TNT

May 9
7:00 pm

Recap

Cleveland Cavaliers 91, Detroit Pistons 97
Scoring by quarter: 16–23, 20–29, 24–26, 31–19
| Pts: LeBron James 30; Rebs: LeBron James 14; Asts: LeBron James 7 | Pts: Rasheed Wallace 29; Rebs: Ben Wallace 15; Asts: Chauncey Billups 7 |
Detroit leads series, 2–0

The Palace of Auburn Hills, Auburn Hills, Michigan
Attendance: 22,076
Referees: Dick Bavetta, Derrick Stafford, Jess Kersey

ESPN

May 13
5:00 pm

Recap

Detroit Pistons 77, Cleveland Cavaliers 86
Scoring by quarter: 17–18, 25–18, 14–17, 21–33
| Pts: Richard Hamilton 22; Rebs: Ben Wallace 13; Asts: Billups, Hamilton 5 each | Pts: LeBron James 21; Rebs: LeBron James 10; Asts: LeBron James 10 |
Detroit leads series, 2–1

Quicken Loans Arena, Cleveland, Ohio
Attendance: 20,562
Referees: Bob Delaney, Steve Javie, Tom Washington

TNT

May 15
7:00 pm

Recap

Detroit Pistons 72, Cleveland Cavaliers 74
Scoring by quarter: 19–16, 19–20, 21–17, 13–21
| Pts: Richard Hamilton 30; Rebs: Ben Wallace 10; Asts: Chauncey Billups 7 | Pts: LeBron James 22; Rebs: LeBron James 8 Asts: LeBron James 9 |
Series tied, 2–2

Quicken Loans Arena, Cleveland, Ohio
Attendance: 20,562
Referees: Monty McCutchen, Eddie F. Rush, Bennett Salvatore

TNT

May 17
7:00 pm

Recap

Cleveland Cavaliers 86, Detroit Pistons 84
Scoring by quarter: 20–20, 30–25, 18–21, 18–18
| Pts: LeBron James 32; Rebs: Donyell Marshall 13; Asts: Eric Snow 7 | Pts: Tayshaun Prince 21; Rebs: Ben Wallace 13; Asts: Chauncey Billups 5 |
Cleveland leads series, 3–2

The Palace of Auburn Hills, Auburn Hills, Michigan
Attendance: 22,076
Referees: Jimmy Clark, Dan Crawford, Ken Mauer

ESPN

May 19
7:00 pm

Recap

Detroit Pistons 84, Cleveland Cavaliers 82
Scoring by quarter: 20–19, 18–18, 25–24, 21–21
| Pts: Rasheed Wallace 24; Rebs: Ben Wallace 10; Asts: Billups, Wallace 4 each | Pts: LeBron James 32; Rebs: LeBron James 11; Asts: Eric Snow 7 |
Series tied, 3–3

Quicken Loans Arena, Cleveland, Ohio
Attendance: 20,562
Referees: Joe Forte, Bernie Fryer, Ron Garretson

ABC

May 21
3:30 pm

Recap

Cleveland Cavaliers 61, Detroit Pistons 79
Scoring by quarter: 15–21, 23–19, 10–18, 13–21
| Pts: LeBron James 27; Rebs: LeBron James 8 Asts: Larry Hughes 5 | Pts: Tayshaun Prince 20; Rebs: Ben Wallace 9 Asts: Billups, Prince 3 each |
Detroit wins series, 4–3

The Palace of Auburn Hills, Auburn Hills, Michigan
Attendance: 22,076
Referees: Mike Callahan, Joe Crawford, Joe DeRosa

2006 marked the first time the Cavaliers had made the playoffs since 1998 with Shawn Kemp, and the first time that major professional teams from Michigan and Ohio met in a postseason series or game since 1957. They came off a playoff series win vs the Wizards, while the Pistons came in off a 4–1 win vs the 8th seeded Bucks. Detroit was expected to win the series, and took a commanding two games to none lead with two wins at the Palace of Auburn Hills. James and the Cavaliers weren't intimidated however, and won their two home games to tie the series at 2. Coming into Game 5, both teams were confident, but the Pistons were expected to pull out the win easily. The game was low scoring throughout as usual in this series, with Cleveland holding a 68–66 lead through 3 quarters. With the game tied at 84 with 26 seconds left in regulation, Drew Gooden came through and hit a layup to give Cleveland the lead that they never squandered. James led the Cavs with 32 and this brought the series to Cleveland up 3–2, quite shockingly. In the final minute of Game 6, Richard Hamilton grabbed two offensive rebounds and passed the ball to Rasheed Wallace, who was fouled. Detroit held on to win Game 6 by 2, and won Game 7 at home to advance.

Regular-season series
Detroit won 3–1 in the regular-season series

December 31, 2005

Recap

Detroit Pistons 84, Cleveland Cavaliers 97

Quicken Loans Arena, Cleveland, Ohio

February 26, 2006

Recap

Cleveland Cavaliers 78, Detroit Pistons 90

The Palace of Auburn Hills, Auburn Hills, Michigan

February 27, 2006

Recap

Detroit Pistons 84, Cleveland Cavaliers 72

Quicken Loans Arena, Cleveland, Ohio

April 12, 2006

Recap

Cleveland Cavaliers 73, Detroit Pistons 96

The Palace of Auburn Hills, Auburn Hills, Michigan

This was the first playoff meeting between the Cavaliers and the Pistons.

==== (2) Miami Heat vs. (3) New Jersey Nets ====
TNT

May 8
8:00 pm

Recap

New Jersey Nets 100, Miami Heat 88
Scoring by quarter: 38–21, 26–25, 20–18, 16–24
| Pts: Vince Carter 27; Rebs: Jason Kidd 9 Asts: Jason Kidd 7 | Pts: Dwyane Wade 25; Rebs: Shaquille O'Neal 10; Asts: Wade, Williams 3 each |
New Jersey leads series, 1–0

American Airlines Arena, Miami
Attendance: 20,208
Referees: Sean Corbin, Ken Mauer, Bennett Salvatore

TNT

May 10
8:00 pm

Recap

New Jersey Nets 89, Miami Heat 111
Scoring by quarter: 19–41, 21–19, 27–24, 22–27
| Pts: Vince Carter 22; Rebs: Nenad Krstić 7 Asts: Jason Kidd 6 | Pts: Dwyane Wade 31; Rebs: Udonis Haslem 10; Asts: Dwyane Wade 6 |
Series tied, 1–1

American Airlines Arena, Miami
Attendance: 20,227
Referees: Dan Crawford, Tim Donaghy, Ron Garretson

ESPN

May 12
8:00 pm

Recap

Miami Heat 103, New Jersey Nets 92
Scoring by quarter: 27–27, 27–22, 18–23, 31–20
| Pts: Dwyane Wade 30; Rebs: James Posey 10; Asts: Dwyane Wade 10 | Pts: Vince Carter 43; Rebs: Jason Collins 11; Asts: Jason Kidd 12 |
Miami leads series, 2–1

Continental Airlines Arena, East Rutherford, New Jersey
Attendance: 20,102
Referees: Dick Bavetta, Mike Callahan, Scott Foster

ABC

May 14
3:30 pm

Recap

Miami Heat 102, New Jersey Nets 92
Scoring by quarter: 27–24, 27–24, 22–25, 26–19
| Pts: Dwyane Wade 31; Rebs: Udonis Haslem 11; Asts: Dwyane Wade 8 | Pts: Vince Carter 26; Rebs: Nenad Krstić 14; Asts: Jason Kidd 12 |
Miami leads series, 3–1

Continental Airlines Arena, East Rutherford, New Jersey
Attendance: 19,474
Referees: Bernie Fryer, Anthony Jordan, Greg Willard, Jess Kersey

TNT

May 16
8:00 pm

Recap

New Jersey Nets 105, Miami Heat 106
Scoring by quarter: 33–24, 21–30, 28–31, 23–21
| Pts: Carter, Jefferson 33 each Rebs: three players 7 each Asts: Jason Kidd 8 | Pts: Antoine Walker 23; Rebs: Udonis Haslem 10; Asts: Dwyane Wade 6 |
Miami wins series, 4–1

American Airlines Arena, Miami
Attendance: 20,255
Referees: Joe Crawford, Bob Delaney, Jack Nies

Regular-season series
New Jersey won 3–1 in the regular-season series

November 7, 2005

Recap

New Jersey Nets 89, Miami Heat 90

American Airlines Arena, Miami

December 23, 2005

Recap

New Jersey Nets 95, Miami Heat 88

American Airlines Arena, Miami

February 4, 2006

Recap

Miami Heat 92, New Jersey Nets 105

Continental Airlines Arena, East Rutherford, New Jersey

April 2, 2006

Recap

Miami Heat 78, New Jersey Nets 90

Continental Airlines Arena, East Rutherford, New Jersey

This was the second playoff meeting between these two teams, with the Heat winning the first meeting.

Previous playoff series
Miami leads 1–0 in all-time playoff series

2005

Miami Heat 4, New Jersey Nets 0

2005 Eastern Conference First Round

=== Western Conference semifinals ===
This was the first time both conference semifinals went seven games since 1994.

==== (1) San Antonio Spurs vs. (4) Dallas Mavericks ====
ABC

May 7
1:00 pm

Recap

Dallas Mavericks 85, San Antonio Spurs 87
Scoring by quarter: 29–26, 23–20, 20–25, 13–16
| Pts: Jerry Stackhouse 24; Rebs: Dirk Nowitzki 14; Asts: Marquis Daniels 3 | Pts: Tim Duncan 31; Rebs: Tim Duncan 13; Asts: Duncan, Parker 4 each |
San Antonio leads series, 1–0

AT&T Center, San Antonio
Attendance: 18,797
Referees: Dan Crawford, Greg Willard, Mark Wunderlich

TNT

May 9
9:30 pm

Recap

Dallas Mavericks 113, San Antonio Spurs 91
Scoring by quarter: 26–22, 32–16, 26–28, 29–25
| Pts: Josh Howard 27; Rebs: Howard, Nowitzki 9 each Asts: three players 3 each | Pts: Tim Duncan 28; Rebs: Tim Duncan 9 Asts: Tim Duncan 3 |
Series tied, 1–1

AT&T Center, San Antonio
Attendance: 18,797
Referees: Steve Javie, David Jones, Eddie F. Rush

ABC

May 13
8:00 pm

Recap

San Antonio Spurs 103, Dallas Mavericks 104
Scoring by quarter: 18–27, 30–26, 21–20, 34–31
| Pts: Tim Duncan 35; Rebs: Tim Duncan 12; Asts: Tony Parker 4 | Pts: Dirk Nowitzki 27; Rebs: Dirk Nowitzki 15; Asts: Jason Terry 4 |
Dallas leads series, 2–1

American Airlines Center, Dallas
Attendance: 20,865
Referees: Joe Crawford, Joe DeRosa, Bill Spooner

TNT

May 15
9:30 pm

Recap

San Antonio Spurs 118, Dallas Mavericks 123 (OT)
Scoring by quarter: 26–19, 27–34, 27–31, 31–27, Overtime: 7–12
| Pts: Tony Parker 33; Rebs: Tim Duncan 13; Asts: Tim Duncan 6 | Pts: Jason Terry 32; Rebs: Dampier, Nowitzki 9 each Asts: Devin Harris 6 |
Dallas leads series, 3–1

American Airlines Center, Dallas
Attendance: 20,969
Referees: Dick Bavetta, Jimmy Clark, Derrick Stafford

TNT

May 17
9:30 pm

Recap

Dallas Mavericks 97, San Antonio Spurs 98
Scoring by quarter: 24–29, 33–28, 21–24, 19–17
| Pts: Dirk Nowitzki 31; Rebs: Dirk Nowitzki 12; Asts: Jason Terry 5 | Pts: Tim Duncan 36; Rebs: Tim Duncan 10; Asts: Manu Ginóbili 5 |
Dallas leads series, 3–2

AT&T Center, San Antonio
Attendance: 18,797
Referees: Joe Forte, Bernie Fryer, Ron Garretson

ESPN

May 19
9:30 pm

Recap

San Antonio Spurs 91, Dallas Mavericks 86
Scoring by quarter: 20–25, 21–22, 26–20, 24–19
| Pts: Manu Ginóbili 30; Rebs: Manu Ginóbili 10; Asts: Tony Parker 3 | Pts: Dirk Nowitzki 26; Rebs: Dirk Nowitzki 21; Asts: Dirk Nowitzki 5 |
Series tied, 3–3

American Airlines Center, Dallas
Attendance: 20,986
Referees: Mike Callahan, Ken Mauer, Bennett Salvatore

TNT

May 22
8:00 pm

Recap

Dallas Mavericks 119, San Antonio Spurs 111 (OT)
Scoring by quarter: 37–27, 27–23, 20–28, 20–26, Overtime: 15–7
| Pts: Dirk Nowitzki 37; Rebs: Dirk Nowitzki 15; Asts: Jerry Stackhouse 6 | Pts: Tim Duncan 41; Rebs: Tim Duncan 15; Asts: Tim Duncan 6 |
Dallas wins series, 4–3

AT&T Center, San Antonio
Referees: Dick Bavetta, Bob Delaney, Steve Javie

The Mavericks almost blew a 3–1 series lead to the defending champion San Antonio Spurs, but managed to pull out a Game 7 overtime win in San Antonio to close out the series and become the fifth road team to win Game 7 after leading the series 3–1. This was also the second time in NBA history that the road team won a Game 7 in overtime; the Los Angeles Lakers defeated the Sacramento Kings in the same manner in the 2002 Western Conference finals. This was the most recent Game 7 to go into overtime until the 2021 Bucks-Nets series.

Regular-season series
Tied 2–2 in the regular-season series

November 5, 2005

Recap

San Antonio Spurs 84, Dallas Mavericks 103

American Airlines Center, Dallas

December 1, 2005

Recap

San Antonio Spurs 92, Dallas Mavericks 90

American Airlines Center, Dallas

March 2, 2006

Recap

Dallas Mavericks 89, San Antonio Spurs 98

AT&T Center, San Antonio

April 7, 2006

Recap

Dallas Mavericks 92, San Antonio Spurs 86

AT&T Center, San Antonio

This was the third playoff meeting between these two teams, with the Spurs winning the first two meetings.

Previous playoff series
San Antonio leads 2–0 in all-time playoff series

2001

Dallas Mavericks 1, San Antonio Spurs 4

2001 Western Conference semifinals

2003

Dallas Mavericks 2, San Antonio Spurs 4

2003 Western Conference finals

==== (2) Phoenix Suns vs. (6) Los Angeles Clippers ====
TNT

May 8
10:30 pm

Recap

Los Angeles Clippers 123, Phoenix Suns 130
Scoring by quarter: 25–29, 36–27, 30–37, 32–37
| Pts: Elton Brand 40; Rebs: Elton Brand 9 Asts: Shaun Livingston 9 | Pts: Steve Nash 31; Rebs: Shawn Marion 15; Asts: Steve Nash 12 |
Phoenix leads series, 1–0

US Airways Center, Phoenix, Arizona
Attendance: 18,422
Referees: Jimmy Clark, Bernie Fryer, Monty McCutchen

TNT

May 10
10:30 pm

Recap

Los Angeles Clippers 122, Phoenix Suns 97
Scoring by quarter: 38–22, 27–29, 33–28, 24–18
| Pts: Elton Brand 27; Rebs: Chris Kaman 16; Asts: Sam Cassell 6 | Pts: Raja Bell 20; Rebs: Shawn Marion 6 Asts: Steve Nash 8 |
Series tied, 1–1

US Airways Center, Phoenix, Arizona
Attendance: 18,422
Referees: Joe Crawford, Jack Nies, Michael Smith

ESPN

May 12
10:30 pm

Recap

Phoenix Suns 94, Los Angeles Clippers 91
Scoring by quarter: 26–28, 22–20, 24–15, 22–28
| Pts: Shawn Marion 32; Rebs: Shawn Marion 19; Asts: Steve Nash 10 | Pts: Elton Brand 20; Rebs: Corey Maggette 14; Asts: Elton Brand 8 |
Phoenix leads series, 2–1

Staples Center, Los Angeles
Attendance: 19,877
Referees: Tony Brothers, Joe Forte, Bennett Salvatore

TNT

May 14
8:00 pm

Recap

Phoenix Suns 107, Los Angeles Clippers 114
Scoring by quarter: 28–33, 23–28, 31–29, 25–24
| Pts: Raja Bell 33; Rebs: Shawn Marion 10; Asts: Steve Nash 11 | Pts: Elton Brand 30; Rebs: Corey Maggette 15; Asts: Sam Cassell 9 |
Series tied, 2–2

Staples Center, Los Angeles
Attendance: 19,897
Referees: Sean Corbin, Dan Crawford, Ken Mauer

TNT

May 16
10:30 pm

Recap

Los Angeles Clippers 118, Phoenix Suns 125 (2OT)
Scoring by quarter: 31–26, 21–32, 26–26, 23–17, Overtime: 10–10, 7–14
| Pts: Elton Brand 33; Rebs: Elton Brand 15; Asts: Brand, Cassell 5 each | Pts: Shawn Marion 36; Rebs: Shawn Marion 20; Asts: Steve Nash 13 |
Phoenix leads series, 3–2

US Airways Center, Phoenix, Arizona
Attendance: 18,422
Referees: Mike Callahan, Joe DeRosa, Steve Javie

ESPN

May 18
10:00 pm

Recap

Phoenix Suns 106, Los Angeles Clippers 118
Scoring by quarter: 32–31, 18–31, 31–26, 25–30
| Pts: Shawn Marion 34; Rebs: Diaw, Marion 9 each Asts: Steve Nash 11 | Pts: Elton Brand 30; Rebs: Elton Brand 13; Asts: Sam Cassell 8 |
Series tied, 3–3

Staples Center, Los Angeles
Attendance: 19,985
Referees: Dick Bavetta, Tom Washington, Greg Willard

TNT

May 22
10:30 pm

Recap

Los Angeles Clippers 107, Phoenix Suns 127
Scoring by quarter: 28–32, 29–33, 22–29, 28–33
| Pts: Elton Brand 36; Rebs: Brand, Maggette 9 each Asts: Sam Cassell 6 | Pts: Shawn Marion 30; Rebs: Shawn Marion 9 Asts: Steve Nash 11 |
Phoenix wins series, 4–3

US Airways Center, Phoenix, Arizona
Attendance: 18,422
Referees: Dan Crawford, Ron Garretson, Eddie F. Rush

- In Game 4, Sam Cassell hit two three-pointers down the stretch, including one with 27 seconds left, after the Suns had rallied from 13 down to within one with under a minute to play.
- In Game 5, Raja Bell tied the game at 111 on a three-pointer from the corner with 1.1 seconds left to force the second overtime, this after telling his teammates during a timeout he would make it. The Suns, who blew a 19-point third quarter lead, never trailed in the second extra session.

Regular-season series
Tied 2–2 in the regular-season series

December 10, 2005

Recap

Phoenix Suns 91, Los Angeles Clippers 101

Staples Center, Los Angeles

January 18, 2006

Recap

Phoenix Suns 112, Los Angeles Clippers 102

Staples Center, Los Angeles

March 15, 2006

Recap

Los Angeles Clippers 95, Phoenix Suns 126

US Airways Center, Phoenix, Arizona

April 5, 2006

Recap

Los Angeles Clippers 119, Phoenix Suns 105

US Airways Center, Phoenix, Arizona

This was the first playoff meeting between the Clippers and the Suns.

== Conference finals ==
=== Eastern Conference finals ===
==== (1) Detroit Pistons vs. (2) Miami Heat ====
ESPN

May 23
8:00 pm

Recap

Miami Heat 91, Detroit Pistons 86
Scoring by quarter: 33–25, 15–19, 18–17, 25–25
| Pts: Dwyane Wade 25; Rebs: Udonis Haslem 9 Asts: Dwyane Wade 5 | Pts: Richard Hamilton 22; Rebs: Ben Wallace 14; Asts: Chauncey Billups 7 |
Miami leads series, 1–0

The Palace of Auburn Hills, Auburn Hills, Michigan
Attendance: 22,076
Referees: Ken Mauer, Bennett Salvatore, Bill Spooner

ESPN

May 25
8:00 pm

Recap

Miami Heat 88, Detroit Pistons 92
Scoring by quarter: 12–25, 25–23, 19–22, 32–22
| Pts: Dwyane Wade 32; Rebs: Shaquille O'Neal 12; Asts: Payton, Wade 5 each | Pts: Tayshaun Prince 24; Rebs: Ben Wallace 12; Asts: Chauncey Billups 8 |
Series tied, 1–1

The Palace of Auburn Hills, Auburn Hills, Michigan
Attendance: 22,076
Referees: Dick Bavetta, Ron Garretson, Jack Nies

ESPN

May 27
8:00 pm

Recap

Detroit Pistons 83, Miami Heat 98
Scoring by quarter: 24–26, 14–23, 24–25, 21–24
| Pts: Chauncey Billups 31; Rebs: Rasheed Wallace 10; Asts: Tayshaun Prince 4 | Pts: Dwyane Wade 35; Rebs: Shaquille O'Neal 12; Asts: Antoine Walker 4 |
Miami leads series, 2–1

American Airlines Arena, Miami
Attendance: 20,245
Referees: Dan Crawford, Tom Washington, Mark Wunderlich

ABC

May 29
8:00 pm

Recap

Detroit Pistons 78, Miami Heat 89
Scoring by quarter: 17–23, 21–21, 22–18, 18–27
| Pts: Tayshaun Prince 15; Rebs: Ben Wallace 11; Asts: Chauncey Billups 7 | Pts: Dwyane Wade 31; Rebs: Shaquille O'Neal 9 Asts: Dwyane Wade 5 |
Miami leads series, 3–1

American Airlines Arena, Miami
Attendance: 20,248
Referees: Bob Delaney, Bernie Fryer, Greg Willard

ESPN

May 31
8:00 pm

Recap

Miami Heat 78, Detroit Pistons 91
Scoring by quarter: 20–25, 23–22, 22–26, 13–18
| Pts: Dwyane Wade 23; Rebs: Udonis Haslem 10; Asts: Jason Williams 6 | Pts: Tayshaun Prince 29; Rebs: Richard Hamilton 10; Asts: Chauncey Billups 10 |
Miami leads series, 3–2

The Palace of Auburn Hills, Auburn Hills, Michigan
Attendance: 22,076
Referees: Joe Crawford, Joe DeRosa, Joe Forte

ESPN

June 2
8:00 pm

Recap

Detroit Pistons 78, Miami Heat 95
Scoring by quarter: 20–25, 16–22, 17–25, 25–23
| Pts: Richard Hamilton 33; Rebs: Rasheed Wallace 8 Asts: Chauncey Billups 8 | Pts: Shaquille O'Neal 28; Rebs: Shaquille O'Neal 16; Asts: Dwyane Wade 10 |
Miami wins series, 4–2

American Airlines Arena, Miami
Attendance: 20,258
Referees: Mike Callahan, Steve Javie, Eddie F. Rush

Regular-season series
Detroit won 3–1 in the regular-season series

December 29, 2005

Recap

Miami Heat 101, Detroit Pistons 106

The Palace of Auburn Hills, Auburn Hills, Michigan

February 12, 2006

Recap

Detroit Pistons 98, Miami Heat 100

American Airlines Arena, Miami

March 22, 2006

Recap

Miami Heat 73, Detroit Pistons 82

The Palace of Auburn Hills, Auburn Hills, Michigan

April 6, 2006

Recap

Detroit Pistons 95, Miami Heat 82

American Airlines Arena, Miami

This was the third playoff meeting between these two teams, with each team winning one series apiece.

Previous playoff series
Tied 1–1 in all-time playoff series

2000

Detroit Pistons 0, Miami Heat 3

2000 Eastern Conference First Round

2005

Detroit Pistons 4, Miami Heat 3

2005 Eastern Conference finals

=== Western Conference finals ===
==== (2) Phoenix Suns vs. (4) Dallas Mavericks ====
TNT

May 24
8:30 pm

Recap

Phoenix Suns 121, Dallas Mavericks 118
Scoring by quarter: 35–29, 27–29, 29–27, 30–33
| Pts: Boris Diaw 34; Rebs: Shawn Marion 13; Asts: Steve Nash 16 | Pts: Devin Harris 30; Rebs: Dirk Nowitzki 19; Asts: Terry, Stackhouse 3 each |
Phoenix leads series, 1–0

American Airlines Center, Dallas
Attendance: 20,789
Referees: Joe Forte, Bernie Fryer, Greg Willard

TNT

May 26
8:30 pm

Recap

Phoenix Suns 98, Dallas Mavericks 105
Scoring by quarter: 17–22, 35–25, 25–28, 21–30
| Pts: Boris Diaw 25; Rebs: Shawn Marion 19; Asts: Steve Nash 11 | Pts: Dirk Nowitzki 30; Rebs: Dirk Nowitzki 14; Asts: Dirk Nowitzki 6 |
Series tied, 1–1

American Airlines Center, Dallas
Attendance: 20,934
Referees: Jimmy Clark, Joe Crawford, Joe DeRosa

TNT

May 28
8:30 pm

Recap

Dallas Mavericks 95, Phoenix Suns 88
Scoring by quarter: 22–25, 25–27, 25–16, 23–20
| Pts: Dirk Nowitzki 28; Rebs: Dirk Nowitzki 17; Asts: Dirk Nowitzki 5 | Pts: Steve Nash 21; Rebs: Shawn Marion 18; Asts: Steve Nash 7 |
Dallas leads series, 2–1

US Airways Center, Phoenix, Arizona
Attendance: 18,422
Referees: Mike Callahan, Steve Javie, Eddie F. Rush

TNT

May 30
8:30 pm

Recap

Dallas Mavericks 86, Phoenix Suns 106
Scoring by quarter: 28–28, 18–23, 21–28, 19–27
| Pts: Josh Howard 16; Rebs: Josh Howard 9 Asts: Devin Harris 5 | Pts: Leandro Barbosa 24; Rebs: Boris Diaw 9 Asts: Steve Nash 7 |
Series tied, 2–2

US Airways Center, Phoenix, Arizona
Attendance: 18,422
Referees: Ron Garretson, Bennett Salvatore, Tom Washington

TNT

June 1
8:30 pm

Recap

Phoenix Suns 101, Dallas Mavericks 117
Scoring by quarter: 23–36, 32–22, 26–24, 20–35
| Pts: Tim Thomas 26; Rebs: Shawn Marion 10; Asts: Steve Nash 11 | Pts: Dirk Nowitzki 50; Rebs: Dirk Nowitzki 12; Asts: Jason Terry 9 |
Dallas leads series, 3–2

American Airlines Center, Dallas
Attendance: 20,977
Referees: Dan Crawford, Ken Mauer, Jack Nies

TNT

June 3
8:30 pm

Recap

Dallas Mavericks 102, Phoenix Suns 93
Scoring by quarter: 14–29, 25–22, 23–15, 40–27
| Pts: Dirk Nowitzki 24; Rebs: Josh Howard 15; Asts: Nowitzki, Terry 3 each | Pts: Boris Diaw 30; Rebs: Diaw, Marion 11 each Asts: Steve Nash 9 |
Dallas wins series, 4–2

US Airways Center, Phoenix, Arizona
Attendance: 18,422
Referees: Dick Bavetta, Bob Delaney, Bernie Fryer

Regular-season series
Tied 2–2 in the regular-season series

November 1, 2005

Recap

Dallas Mavericks 111, Phoenix Suns 108 (2OT)

America West Arena, Phoenix, Arizona

December 14, 2005

Recap

Phoenix Suns 96, Dallas Mavericks 102

American Airlines Center, Dallas

March 5, 2006

Recap

Phoenix Suns 115, Dallas Mavericks 107

American Airlines Center, Dallas

April 13, 2006

Recap

Dallas Mavericks 104, Phoenix Suns 117

US Airways Center, Phoenix, Arizona

This was the second playoff meeting between these two teams, with the Suns winning the first meeting.

Previous playoff series
Phoenix leads 1–0 in all-time playoff series

2005

Dallas Mavericks 2, Phoenix Suns 4

2005 Western Conference semifinals

- This is the most recent playoff series between the Suns & Mavericks until 2022.

== NBA Finals: (W4) Dallas Mavericks vs. (E2) Miami Heat ==
All times are in Eastern Daylight Time (UTC−4)

ABC

June 8
9:00 pm

Recap

Miami Heat 80, Dallas Mavericks 90
Scoring by quarter: 31–23, 13–23, 24–24, 12–20
| Pts: Dwyane Wade 28; Rebs: Udonis Haslem 9 Asts: Dwyane Wade 6 | Pts: Jason Terry 32; Rebs: Josh Howard 12; Asts: three players 4 each |
Dallas leads series, 1–0

American Airlines Center, Dallas
Attendance: 20,475
Referees: Joe Crawford, Joe DeRosa, Bennett Salvatore

ABC

June 11
9:00 pm

Recap

Miami Heat 85, Dallas Mavericks 99
Scoring by quarter: 17–18, 17–32, 24–32, 27–17
| Pts: Dwyane Wade 23; Rebs: Dwyane Wade 8 Asts: Payton, Williams 4 each | Pts: Dirk Nowitzki 26; Rebs: Dirk Nowitzki 16; Asts: Jason Terry 9 |
Dallas leads series, 2–0

American Airlines Center, Dallas
Attendance: 20,459
Referees: Bob Delaney, Steve Javie, Eddie F. Rush

ABC

June 13
9:00 pm

Recap

Dallas Mavericks 96, Miami Heat 98
Scoring by quarter: 21–29, 22–23, 34–16, 19–30
| Pts: Dirk Nowitzki 30; Rebs: Erick Dampier 9 Asts: Jason Terry 5 | Pts: Dwyane Wade 42; Rebs: Dwyane Wade 13; Asts: Shaquille O'Neal 5 |
Dallas leads series, 2–1

American Airlines Arena, Miami
Attendance: 20,145
Referees: Dan Crawford, Ken Mauer, Jack Nies

ABC

June 15
9:00 pm

Recap

Dallas Mavericks 74, Miami Heat 98
Scoring by quarter: 25–30, 19–24, 23–24, 7–20
| Pts: Jason Terry 17; Rebs: Dirk Nowitzki 9 Asts: Jerry Stackhouse 4 | Pts: Dwyane Wade 36; Rebs: Shaquille O'Neal 13; Asts: Jason Williams 6 |
Series tied, 2–2

American Airlines Arena, Miami
Attendance: 20,145
Referees: Dick Bavetta, Mike Callahan, Bernie Fryer

ABC

June 18
9:00 pm

Recap

Dallas Mavericks 100, Miami Heat 101 (OT)
Scoring by quarter: 21–24, 30–19, 20–27, 22–23, Overtime: 7–8
| Pts: Jason Terry 35; Rebs: Josh Howard 10; Asts: Marquis Daniels 4 | Pts: Dwyane Wade 43; Rebs: Shaquille O'Neal 12; Asts: Wade, Williams 4 each |
Miami leads series, 3–2

American Airlines Arena, Miami
Attendance: 20,145
Referees: Joe Crawford, Joe DeRosa, Bennett Salvatore

ABC

June 20
9:00 pm

Recap

Miami Heat 95, Dallas Mavericks 92
Scoring by quarter: 23–30, 26–18, 22–20, 24–24
| Pts: Dwyane Wade 36; Rebs: Shaquille O'Neal 12; Asts: Jason Williams 7 | Pts: Dirk Nowitzki 29; Rebs: Dirk Nowitzki 15; Asts: Jason Terry 5 |
Miami wins series, 4–2

American Airlines Center, Dallas
Attendance: 20,522
Referees: Dan Crawford, Steve Javie, Eddie F. Rush

Regular-season series
Dallas won 2–0 in the regular-season series

November 25, 2005

Recap

Dallas Mavericks 103, Miami Heat 90

American Airlines Arena, Miami

February 9, 2006

Recap

Miami Heat 76, Dallas Mavericks 112

American Airlines Center, Dallas

This was the first playoff meeting between the Mavericks and the Heat.

This NBA Finals featured two teams that never made it to the finals before. The last time this happened was in 1971, when the Milwaukee Bucks met the Baltimore Bullets.

== Statistic leaders ==
| Category | High | | | Average | | | |
| Category | Player | Team | Total | Player | Team | Avg. | Games played |
|---|---|---|---|---|---|---|---|
| Points | Dirk Nowitzki; Kobe Bryant | Dallas Mavericks; Los Angeles Lakers | 50 | Gilbert Arenas | Washington Wizards | 34.0 | 6 |
| Rebounds | Dirk Nowitzki | Dallas Mavericks | 21 | Bonzi Wells | Sacramento Kings | 12.0 | 6 |
| Assists | Steve Nash | Phoenix Suns | 16 | Steve Nash | Phoenix Suns | 10.2 | 20 |
| Steals | Shawn Marion; Vince Carter | Phoenix Suns; New Jersey Nets | 6 | Larry Hughes | Cleveland Cavaliers | 2.2 | 9 |
| Blocks | James Jones; Zydrunas Ilgauskas; Tim Duncan | Phoenix Suns; Cleveland Cavaliers; San Antonio Spurs | 6 | Marcus Camby | Denver Nuggets | 2.8 | 5 |
