= Keith Stubbs =

Keith Stubbs (born January 12, 1960) is an American stand-up comedian, actor, radio personality, and businessman.

== Early life and education ==
Stubbs was born in Bennettsville, South Carolina in 1960. Stubbs' father served in the United States Armed Forces. He was the fifth of seven children. Stubbs graduated from RB Stall High School in North Charleston, South Carolina in 1978. He then attended Brigham Young University, but did not graduate. Stubbs is a member of the Church of Jesus Christ of Latter-day Saints, and served an LDS Mission in Ecuador. In his early twenties, Stubbs went door-to-door selling peep holes to support himself. Stubbs eventually became a stockbroker with Paine Webber in Los Angeles, but left to pursue a career in comedy.

== Stand-Up ==
Stubbs studied comedy improv at the Groundlings Theatre & School in Hollywood, California. He began performing stand up comedy in 1991. Stubbs has opened for notable comedians like Frank Caliendo, Lewis Black, Jim Gaffigan, Joan Rivers, and Joel McHale.

== Radio ==
Stubbs formerly hosted two radio programs in the Salt Lake City metropolitan area. He first hosted The Stubbs Show on KEGA, 101.5 The Eagle. He also hosted Keith Stubbs Sports on ESPN 700.

== Television ==
Stubbs has performed twice on A&E’s An Evening at the Improv program. He also appeared on Rob Schneider's Netflix series Real Rob as Rob's accountant and on Byron Allen's Comedy.tv.

== Business ==
Stubbs is the owner of the Wiseguys Comedy Clubs in Salt Lake City, and Ogden.
