= John Kresse Arena =

Arena in Charleston, South Carolina

Coordinates: 32°47′7″N 79°56′3″W

John Kresse Arena is a 3,000-seat multi-purpose arena in Charleston, South Carolina. It was the home to the College of Charleston Cougars basketball team from 1982 to 2008. The facility opened as the F. Mitchell Johnson Arena in 1982. In 1994, it was renamed after the school's longtime head basketball coach John Kresse—making Kresse one of the few active collegiate coaches to coach in an arena that is named for him. It hosted the 1997 and 1998 Atlantic Sun Conference men's basketball tournaments. It was replaced by Carolina First Arena, now TD Arena, which opened in October 2008.
