= White Company (disambiguation) =

The White Company was a 14th-century English mercenary company which operated in Italy.

White Company may also refer to:

- The White Company (1891), historical adventure novel by Arthur Conan Doyle
- The White Company (retailer), a UK chain of houseware and furniture stores
- White Furniture Company, an American furniture manufacturing company which operated from 1881 to 1993
- White Motor Company, an American automobile, truck, bus and agricultural tractor manufacturer which operated from 1900 until 1980
- White Sewing Machine Company, an American company founded in 1858, now part of Electrolux

== See also ==
- White and Company, an Illinois manufacturer of stoneware and tile which is connected to two archaeological sites:
  - White and Company's Goose Lake Stoneware Manufactury
  - White and Company's Goose Lake Tile Works
