= Bill Bamberger =

American documentary photographer (born 1956)

- Born: Bill Bamberger Jr. 1956 (age 69–70); Philadelphia, Pennsylvania, US
- Education: University of North Carolina at Chapel Hill
- Known for: Documentary photography, photojournalism
- Notable work: Boys Will Be Men; Closing; Hoops; Stories From Home
- Awards: Mayflower Award for Nonfiction
- Website: www.billbamberger.com

Bill Bamberger Jr. (born 1956) is an American documentary photographer, photojournalist, and author who captures social and cultural issues in America and around the world. Bamberger has been called a "master documentarian" and is known for "taking an intimate approach to his subject matter". His work has been featured in several books and in solo exhibits at the Smithsonian Institution's National Museum of American History, the North Carolina Museum of Art, and the National Building Museum. He is a lecturing fellow at the Center for Documentary Studies at Duke University.

== Background ==
Bamberger is a Philadelphia native and grew up in Long Island, New York, and in Yardley, Pennsylvania. He was a Morehead Scholar at the University of North Carolina at Chapel Hill, graduating in 1979 with a degree in American studies. His main interest in college was originally writing, but he discovered photography and took several classes. Bamberger says, "I chose to be a photographer because this was, for me, the most effective way of telling stories."

After college, he remained in North Carolina, working as a photojournalist with a local newspaper. Bamberger says, "In those days, I did film and printing, and I found every bit of it engaging."

His photographs have been in many publications, including Apeture, Doubletake, Duke Magazine, Fortune, Harper's Magazine, The New York Times Magazine, Time, Vogue, and The Washington Post Magazine. He has been interviewed on various television shows, including CBS Sunday Morning, C-SPAN2's About Books, and North Carolina People on PBS, as well as on All Things Considered on NPR.

Bamberger taught in the Folklore Program at the University of North Carolina at Chapel Hill, and is currently a lecturing fellow at the Center for Documentary Studies at Duke University.

== Photographs and exhibitions ==
As a documentary photographer, Bamberger feels it is important to get consent from his subjects. He says, "With portraits, I try to capture a central element of who we are as an individual. When I'm preparing to do a portrait, I think of the expression that defines that person. With the landscape work, I pay close attention to lighting and exposure." His work has been compared to that of German photographers Bernd and Hilla Becher—a mid-twentieth-century duo who often photographed industrial relics.

Bamberger has shown his photographs at museums and galleries, both large and small. The variety is intentional as he likes to open his exhibits in his subjects' hometowns. For example, his show Closings opened in an old department store where his subjects lived in Mebane, North Carolina, before the show moved to the Smithsonian. He has had solo exhibits at the National Building Museum, the Nasher Museum of Art, the National Museum of American History-Smithsonian Institution, the North Carolina Museum of Art, and Yale University Art Gallery. His work is also on display in United States embassies.

=== Durham County Photographs ===
Bamberger's first significant project documented a cross-section of people living in Durham County, North Carolina from 1979 to 1982. This project received funding from the Center for Documentary Studies at Duke University. The result was a book and an exhibit shown at the Southeastern Center for Contemporary Art, Duke University's Brown Gallery in the Bryan Center, the Reece Museum at East Tennessee State University, and the Morris Gallery of the Pennsylvania Academy of the Fine Arts.

=== Closing: The Life and Death of an American Factory ===
After more than 100 years of operation, a furniture factory in Mebane, North Carolina, closed down in 1993. Bamberger's photographic series documents the final days of work for the 203 men and women who crafted fine furniture at the White Furniture Company. He spent five months on-site in the factory and used 350 rolls of film to capture black and white and color photographs "of everyone and everything"—spending five years total on the project which included following the workers after the factory closed. One reviewer says Bamberger "offers an unusual glimpse into the lives of working-class Americans". Another reviewer notes the artistic quality, saying, "The gentle natural light of the factory interior captures workers, products, and machinery in an elegiac yet unsentimental memorial. This is documentary work of a high order, a corrective to triumphalist cybercratic boosterism, and above all a reminder of the ambiguities and ironies of family values."

Closing was part of an oral history and documentary photography project funded by a North Carolina Humanities Council grant and coordinated by the Southern Oral History Project and the Mebane Arts Council. The exhibit opened at the former Jones Department Store in downtown Mebane, and was also shown at the North Carolina Museum of Art, the Smithsonian Institution's National Museum of American History, and the Yale University Art Gallery. A related book was also published.

=== A House is a Home / Stories from Home ===
In 1994, the Lyndhurst Foundation in Chattanooga, Tennessee asked Bamberger to document "in human terms the impact of home ownership on the lives of families" in three neighborhoods where the Chattanooga Neighborhood Enterprise had built or renovated houses for lower-income people. For the project, he lived and worked with his subjects. After seeing that resulting photographs, the University of North Carolina sponsored, "This House is Home: An Initiative to Advance Affordable Home Ownership in America", involving college students and a national conference. This expanded Bamberger's work into Eastern North Carolina. He also spent six months in San Antonio, Texas, where he lived in a Mexican-American neighborhood that included houses built by Habitat for Humanity.

In 2002, Bamberger had the idea for "A House is a Home", a photo gallery inside a house that could travel across the country. Fabricated for $125,000 with the design help of Gregg Snyder of the University of North Carolina at Charlotte, the mobile art gallery's "purpose is to foster a better understanding of the affordable home-ownership issue." The gallery traveled from 2002 to 2003, going from San Antonio, Texas, to Oregon to North Dakota, and ending in Chapel Hill.

In 2004, a larger exhibit, Stories from Home, was displayed at the National Building Museum. Chrysanthe Broikos, curator at the museum says, "The images are very moving, especially when you see them large scale. It's like you're having a one-to-one conversation with the people. You see the expressions on their faces, the pride and peace, and you see a side of home ownership you might not think of."

=== Boys Will Be Men ===
In the mid-1980s, Bamberger spent a year at Deerfield Academy, a private boarding school in Deerfield, Massachusetts, teaching and documenting students. His goal was to document "the life and coming of age for teenagers" through both photography and interviews. He decided to focus on teenage boys as a way to explore coming of age, male identity, and toxic masculinity.

Through a 1999 National Endowment of the Arts' program, "Artists and Community: America Creates for the Millennium", Bamberger was able to revisit Boys Will Be Men. For the second part of this project, Bamberger chose a public school, Flint Central High School in Flint, Michigan. He spent six months interviewing and photographing students while living a block from the school. At first, the students were reluctant to participate because they were afraid of another Roger & Me, the documentary film by Michael Moore that negatively portrayed their, and his, hometown. However, Bamberger had a room at the school for the duration of his residency. He furnished the room comfortably and displayed recent photographs, creating a popular hangout for the students. He kept equipment worth $20,000 in the room and rarely locked the door.

The resulting audio and photography exhibit opened in January 2002 at the Flint Institute of Arts and at Albion College in 2003. One reviewer noted, "The effect is a compelling audio-visual mosaic of disadvantaged youth at an emotional crossroads." Principal of Flint Central, Jim Beaublem, said, "The positive spinoff from this exhibit is to break apart stereotypes about an inner-city school." Boys Will Be Men, was one of the best-attended exhibits in the history of the Flint Institute of Arts.

In 2004, Bamberger described this project as ongoing in both rural and urban settings. In 2019, Bamberger attempted to reconnect with the Flint students he photographed 19 years earlier.

=== One Rwanda: Portraits of Contemporary Life ===
Bamberger spent three months in Rwanda for the 20th anniversary of the Rwandan genocide. As he took color photos of the daily lives of people, Bamberger wrote, "I stopped thinking about the Rwandese people primarily as Hutus or Tutsis and as perpetrators or survivors. Instead, my photographs explore how the people of Rwanda are finding their way while faced with contemporary issues like healthcare, education, and housing." A related exhibit opened in 2014 at the John Hope Franklin Center Gallery at Duke University. He also took photographs that ended up in his Hoops exhibit.

=== Hoops ===
Lasting fifteen years, the Hoops project includes more than 22,000 photographs of basketball hoops taken in 38 states in the United States and nine countries around the globe. The first photo of the series was taken in Nags Head, North Carolina. Bamberger says, "I started to look, and everywhere I went, I would find them." The resulting exhibit of 75 large-format color photographs, was displayed at the National Building Museum in 2019. A smaller version of the exhibit toured U.S. embassies and the Nasher Museum of Art. One reviewer noted, "By cutting out the players, Bamberger removes the idea of a moment frozen in time, to instead tell the broader story of a place and environment, captured in vivid color." Bamberger says, "Each of these courts speaks to issues like wealth disparity and the design sensibility of the community—how the community creates a court, with what materials, in what setting and what surrounds the court. It's a project about sport, but also in a much larger sense about society: the similarities and differences between one community and another." A book about this project is forthcoming.

== Awards ==
Bamberger won the Mayflower Prize in Nonfiction for his book Closing: The Life and Death of an American Factory, produced with Cathy N. Davidson. Closing was also nominated for the Robert F. Kennedy Book Award.

He was one of 56 American artists selected to participate in "Artists and Communities: America Creates for the Millennium", the National Endowment for the Arts millennium project.

== Publications ==
- Durham County Photographs. The Southeastern Center for Contemporary Art. (1982)
- Closing: The Life and Death of an American Factory (The Lyndhurst Series on the South). By Cathy N. Davidson and Bill Bamberger. W. W. Norton & Company (1998) ISBN 0393045684.
- Boys Will Be Men: Photographs by Bill Bamberger at the Flint Institute of Arts May 17 – July 21, 2002. Flint Institute of Arts (2002). ISBN 978-0939896226.
- Stories of Home and the Mobile Gallery: Photography, Architecture, Community. By Bill Bamberger and Gary Snyder. College of Architecture, University of North Carolina at Charlotte (2003) ISBN 978-0974584003.
- Hoop. Forthcoming from George F. Thompson Publishing.

== Personal ==
Bamberger lives in Durham, North Carolina with his wife Alice Boyle. His photographs are sold through Anne Stewart Fine Art.
