= Charles Barrett =

Charles Barrett may refer to:

- Charles Barrett (climber) (born 1984), American rock climber and convicted rapist
- Charles Stewart Barrett (1901–1982), Irish water polo player
- Charles D. Barrett (1885–1943), U.S. Marines officer
- Charles F. Barrett (1861–1946), adjutant general of Oklahoma
- Charles Golding Barrett (1836–1904), English entomologist (lepidopterist)
- Charles Leslie Barrett (1879–1959), Australian naturalist, journalist, author and ornithologist
- Charles W. Barrett (1869–1947), American architect with Barrett & Thomson
- C. Homer Barrett (1868–1958), American politician from Massachusetts
- C. K. Barrett (Charles Kingsley Barrett, 1917–2011), British biblical scholar
- Red Barrett (Charles Henry Barrett, 1915–1990), American baseball player

== See also ==
- Charley Barrett (1893–1924), American football player
