= JamesOn Curry =

American basketball player (born 1986)

Personal information
- Born: January 7, 1986 (age 40) Pleasant Grove, North Carolina, U.S.
- Listed height: 6 ft 3 in (1.91 m)
- Listed weight: 190 lb (86 kg)

Career information
- High school: Eastern Alamance (Mebane, North Carolina)
- College: Oklahoma State (2004–2007)
- NBA draft: 2007: 2nd round, 51st overall pick
- Drafted by: Chicago Bulls
- Playing career: 2007–2014
- Position: Point guard
- Number: 44

Career history
- 2007–2008: Iowa Energy
- 2008: Pau-Orthez
- 2009: Iowa Energy
- 2009: AEL Limassol B.C.
- 2009–2010: Springfield Armor
- 2010: Los Angeles Clippers
- 2010–2011: Springfield Armor
- 2011: Toros de Aragua
- 2011–2012: Springfield Armor
- 2012: Basket Barcellona
- 2013–2014: Springfield Armor
- 2014: Bakersfield Jam

Career highlights
- NBA D-League All-Star (2012); Third-team All-Big 12 (2007)
- Stats at NBA.com
- Stats at Basketball Reference

JamesOn Curry (born January 7, 1986) is an American former professional basketball player. He played for Oklahoma State University from 2004 to 2007, and after forgoing his senior season, left for the 2007 NBA draft. He was selected in the second round as the 51st overall pick by the Chicago Bulls. After stints in the NBA Development League and Europe, Curry made his NBA debut in January 2010, playing 3.9 seconds for the Los Angeles Clippers. It was Curry's only NBA regular-season appearance and set a record for the shortest NBA career of all time per in-game time spent on the court.

== Early life ==
Curry was born in Pleasant Grove, North Carolina to father Leon and mother Connie (née Parker) Curry. He attended Eastern Alamance High School, in Mebane, North Carolina; in his freshman season, Curry scored a total of 639 points, which at the time was the highest mark for a freshman in North Carolina high school history: the record was then beaten by Junior Robinson in 2011. In 2001, Curry scored 59 points in a game against Chatham High School of Chatham, Virginia. Curry established another single-season scoring record the following year, scoring a total of 892 points, beating the old sophomore record established by Scooter Sherrill in 1998. In his junior year, Curry scored 972 points, another North Carolina record, beating the mark of 954 that Lawrence Clayton had established in 1958.

He averaged 40.2 points, 7.3 rebounds, and 6.0 assists per game as a senior and was a two-time Associated Press All-State first team selection. On December 9, 2003, Curry scored 47 points and added 9 rebounds, 9 assists and 9 steals, thus recording a near-quadruple-double. On January 19, 2004, Curry scored 65 points against Western Alamance High School, two shy of the all-time North Carolina record of 67 established in 1950 by Bob Poole. During that game he shot 25 of 39 from the field (9 of 16 on three-pointers), and also recorded 11 rebounds. Curry set the all-time North Carolina high school scoring record with 3,307 points, which was surpassed in 2018 by UNC recruit Coby White with 3,573 points. In his high school Curry had 74 games where he scored at least 20 points (28 of them in his junior year), 44 30-plus-point games, and 16 games with 40 points or more.

== College career ==
Curry initially signed a National Letter of Intent to play for North Carolina, but his scholarship was rescinded following pleading guilty to drug charges, and he signed with Oklahoma State University (OSU).

As a freshman in 2004–05, Curry started 15 of 33 games played and averaged 9.4 points and 2.8 assists per game. He finished the season ranked ninth among Big 12 leaders in conference games for three-point field goals made (1.75 per game). He scored 22 points on 8-for-11 shooting, in his first start versus Colorado on January 30, 2005. He made six three-pointers out of 8 attempts, including 5-for-5 in the second half, in which he scored 17 of his 22. He matched his career-high 22 points in a 79–67 victory over Oklahoma on February 7, 2005. He scored an OSU freshman all-time NCAA tournament-best 18 points in the 2005 second-round game against Southern Illinois on March 20, 2005.

Highlights of his sophomore season include a career-high 30 points in a 97–61 victory over Mercer on December 18, 2005, and a 22-point, nine-rebound effort in an 81–60 win over Texas on February 19, 2006. He recorded a double-double, scoring 16 points and making a career-high 10 assists, in a 90–56 win over Detroit on November 22, 2005, and matched that assists total against Gonzaga in a 64–62 loss on December 10, 2005.

In his junior season, on November 29, 2006, Curry scored a career-high 35 points (on 12-for-19 shooting) to go along with a season-high 9 assists with no turnovers in a 95–73 win over Texas A&M–Corpus Christi. On January 16, 2007, Curry scored 28 points and grabbed a season-high 9 rebounds in 52 minutes played in a 105–103 triple-overtime win over Texas. On March 3, 2007, Curry scored a new career-high 40 points, including a career-high 7 three-pointers out of ten attempts, in an 86–82 loss to Baylor.

== Professional career ==
Curry was selected by the Chicago Bulls with the 51st overall pick of the 2007 NBA draft. On August 2, 2007, he signed with the Bulls. He was assigned to their NBA Development League affiliate Iowa Energy on November 15, 2007, recalled on December 17, reassigned to Iowa on January 7, 2008, and recalled again on January 24. He later underwent thumb surgery. Curry played 13 games as a starter for Iowa during the 2007–08 season, averaging 20.2 points, 3.2 rebounds, 5.6 assists, 1.08 steals and 39.7 minutes per game. He also shot .463 from the floor, including .377 from three-point range, and .719 from the free throw line. He was waived by the Bulls on July 31, 2008. He did not make his debut for Chicago. By releasing him, the Bulls were only obligated to pay $100,000 of his partially guaranteed salary for 2008–09.

In August 2008, Curry signed with Pau-Orthez of the French league, but was waived in October after failing to impress the coaching staff. In March 2009, he re-joined the Iowa Energy for the rest of the 2008–09 D-League season.

Curry started the 2009–10 season with Proteas EKA AEL, a Cypriot team in Limassol. He was later selected 14th overall in the 2009 NBA D-League Draft by the expansion Springfield Armor. It was their first-ever pick. He joined the Armor for the 2009–10 season.

On January 22, 2010, Curry signed a 10-day contract with the Los Angeles Clippers after averaging 16.1 points, 7.5 assists and 4.0 rebounds with Springfield. He was subbed into a game on January 25, playing just 3.9 seconds. This was the only time Curry would ever play in an NBA game, and is the shortest NBA career in terms of time played. He was released by the Clippers on January 26, when the team acquired Bobby Brown. He returned to the Armor, where he was later waived on March 3, 2010, due to injury.

Curry re-joined the Springfield Armor for the 2010–11 season. Following the D-League season, he had a stint in Venezuela with Toros de Aragua during the 2011 LBP season.

Curry returned to the Armor for the 2011–12 season and was selected to play in the 2012 NBA D-League All-Star Game. In May 2012, he joined Basket Barcellona in Italy.

On November 1, 2013, Curry was re-acquired by the Springfield Armor. On January 2, 2014, he was traded to the Bakersfield Jam. On March 19, 2014, he was waived by the Jam due to a season-ending injury.

== Legal issues ==
In February 2004, Curry was among 49 students arrested in a drug raid that involved North Carolina's Alamance County school system. He was charged with two counts of possession with intent to sell and deliver marijuana, two counts of sale and delivery of marijuana, and two counts of sale, possession, and delivery of a controlled substance on school grounds. Curry pleaded guilty to the drug charges, and the University of North Carolina, with whom he had signed a letter-of-intent, rescinded the scholarship to him.

In the early morning of January 17, 2008, he was arrested in Boise, Idaho and pleaded guilty to resisting arrest and urinating in public. Police took him to the Ada County jail. He was released a few hours later after posting $600 bond. The Chicago Bulls suspended him one game after he pleaded guilty to the two misdemeanors.

On October 20, 2014, Curry was arrested for marijuana possession and false representation to an officer in Edmond, Oklahoma.

== Career statistics ==
Legend
GP	Games played	GS	Games started	MPG	Minutes per game
FG%	Field goal percentage	3P%	3-point field goal percentage	FT%	Free throw percentage
RPG	Rebounds per game	APG	Assists per game	SPG	Steals per game
BPG	Blocks per game	PPG	Points per game	**Bold**	Career high

=== NBA ===
==== Regular season ====
Year	Team	GP	GS	MPG	FG%	3P%	FT%	RPG	APG	SPG	BPG	PPG
2009–10	L.A. Clippers	1	0	.1	–	–	–	.0	.0	.0	.0	.0

== Personal life ==
Curry was brought up on a tobacco farm in rural North Carolina in Pleasant Grove. The unusual capitalization of his first name is a mix of Leon and James, honoring his father and great-uncle, respectively.

Following the end of his basketball career, Curry moved back to his hometown, Pleasant Grove, in 2016.

In April 2017, Curry was injured in a traffic collision, flipped on a freeway while trying to retrieve his dropped mobile phone. It ended his basketball career as he dislocated his ribs and fractured his lower back that needed metal rods inserted there to stabilize it. That July, he returned to Oklahoma. Subsequently, Curry worked several jobs, including as a trucker. His supervisor there asked Curry to coach the YMCA basketball team. Soon after Curry's first coaching experience, he began leading a basketball camp at Drummond High School in Drummond, Oklahoma.
