= Mercedes Bauzá =

American-born Puerto Rican footballer

Personal information
- Full name: Mercedes Lyn Bauzá
- Birth name: Mercedes Lyn Fisher
- Date of birth: 2 November 1997 (age 28)
- Place of birth: North Carolina, United States
- Height: 1.57 m (5 ft 2 in)
- Position: Forward

Team information
- Current team: Puerto Rico Sol
- Number: 12

College career
Years	Team	Apps	(Gls)
2016–2020	Greensboro Pride	63	(41)

Senior career*
Years	Team	Apps	(Gls)
2021–	Puerto Rico Sol	2	(5)

International career^{‡}
2018-	Puerto Rico	1+	(0)
- * Club domestic league appearances and goals as of 5 November 2021 ‡ National team caps and goals as of 11 May 2018

Mercedes Lyn Bauzá (born Mercedes Lyn Fisher) is an American-born Puerto Rican footballer who plays as a forward for Puerto Rico Sol and the Puerto Rico women's national team. Named Queen of the Match by Budweiser in both of her appearances.

== Early life ==
Bauzá was raised in Mebane, North Carolina and attended Eastern Alamance High School.

== Club career ==
=== Puerto Rico Sol FC ===
On 17 October 2021, Bauzá made her debut for Puerto Rico Sol FC. On 31 October, she scored her first senior hat-trick in a 9–1 victory over Metropolitan FA.

== International career ==
Bauzá qualified to play for Puerto Rico through her paternal grandfather. She was capped for Las Boricuas at senior level during the 2018 CONCACAF Women's Championship qualification.
