= Charles F. and Howard Cates Farm =

Historic farm in North Carolina, United States

- U.S. National Register of Historic Places
- U.S. Historic district
- Location within North Carolina Location within the United States
- Location: 4870 Mebane Rogers Rd., near Mebane, North Carolina
- Coordinates: 36°06′48″N 79°16′47″W
- Area: 100 acres (40 ha)
- Built: c. 1905
- Architectural style: Greek Revival, Italianate
- NRHP reference No.: 01001025
- Added to NRHP: September 24, 2001

Charles F. and Howard Cates Farm, also known as Swathmoor Farm, is a historic farm complex and national historic district located near Mebane, Alamance County, North Carolina. It encompasses 11 contributing buildings, 1 contributing site, and 5 contributing structures on a farm near Mebane. The district includes the two-story double-pile Cates farmhouse (c. 1801, c. 1851) and a collection of outbuildings and supporting structures. These include outbuildings probably associated with pickle manufacture such as the packhouse (c. 1900) and the office (c. 1920); outbuildings associated with dairying including the multipurpose barn (c. 1910), the well house (c. 1930), and the milk barn (c. 1939–40); and the mule barn, gas house, tool shed, pump house, privy, and chicken house (c. 1910). Its owner Charles F. Cates was instrumental in establishing the Woodlawn School.

It was added to the National Register of Historic Places in 2001.
