= Barrett & Thomson =

American architect

Barrett & Thomson was an American architectural firm based in Raleigh, North Carolina during the first decade of the 20th century. It was a partnership of Charles W. Barrett (1869–1947) and Frank K. Thomson (1872–1961). It was established in 1900, and dissolved in 1910.

Two of the firm's various projects were selected to be on the U.S. National Register of Historic Places.

Works include:

- Jarvisburg Colored School, built 1911, 7301 NC 158, Jarvisburg, North Carolina (Barrett and Thomson), NRHP-listed
- Woodlawn School, N side NC 1921 0.15 mi. W of jct. with NC 1920, Mebane, North Carolina (Barrett & Thomson), NRHP-listed
- Rex Hospital, built 1909, Raleigh, North Carolina (Barrett and Thompson)
