= Greensboro College =

Private college in Greensboro, North Carolina, US

Coordinates: 36.0710595°N 79.8001921°W

- Former names: Greensboro Female College (1838–1912); Greensboro College for Women (1912–1919)
- Motto: Palma non sine pulvere (Latin)
- Motto in English: (lit. No palm without dust), No reward without effort
- Type: Private college
- Established: 1838; 188 years ago
- Founder: Rev. Peter Doub
- Accreditation: Southern Association of Colleges and Schools
- Religious affiliation: United Methodist Church
- Academic affiliations: IAMSCU
- President: Lawrence D. Czarda
- Provost: Daniel J. Malotky
- Faculty: 45 (FT)
- Students: 730
- Location: Greensboro, North Carolina, U.S.
- Campus: 80 acres (320,000 m^{2})
- Sporting affiliations: NCAA Division III – USA South
- Mascot: The Pride
- Website: greensboro.edu
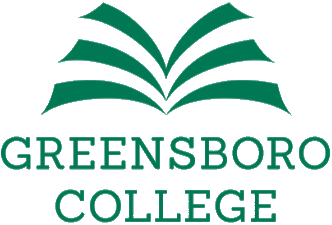

Greensboro College is a private college in Greensboro, North Carolina, United States. It is affiliated with the United Methodist Church and was founded in 1838 by Rev. Peter Doub.

== History ==
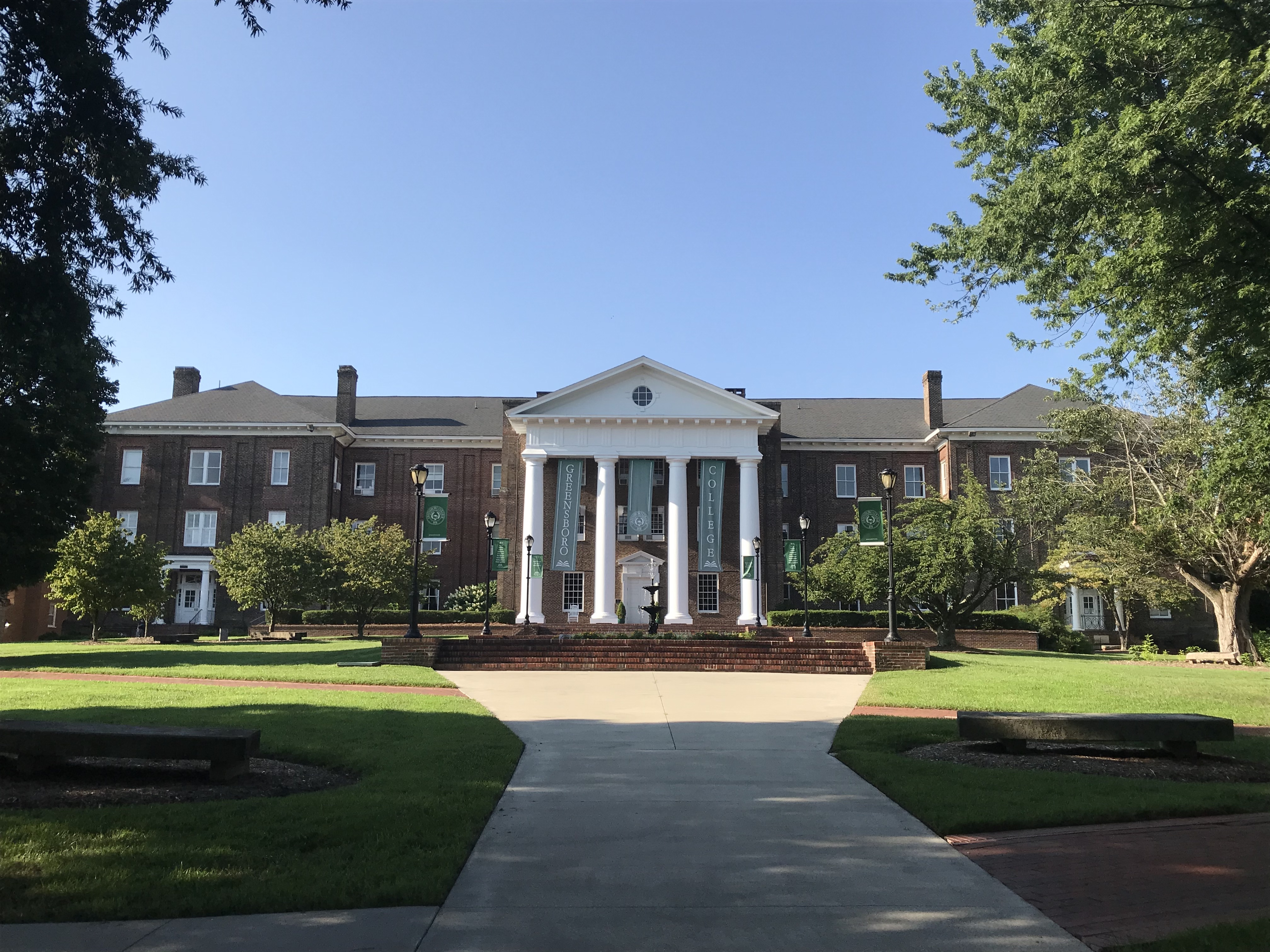
Main Building

The first college to open its doors within the town of Greensboro was the woman's college, "Greensboro Female College". The school occupied a 25-acre (100,000 m^{2}) campus near the heart of the city within what would become the College Hill Historic District. It was organized in 1833 for local children. It was the intent of the Rev. Peter Doub that the institution grow to serve women.

Through the Methodist Church, a charter was secured in 1838, an event which makes the college one of the oldest institutions of higher education for women in the United States. The cornerstone of the first building was laid in 1843, and in 1846 the institution opened its doors to students. Young women came from many southern states to become the first classes of the new president, the Rev. Solomon Lea, and his faculty.

In 1902, the board of trustees elected Lucy Henderson Owen Robertson as the college's first woman president.

In 1912, the school changed its name for the first time, becoming the "Greensboro College for Women". The following year, the newly-renamed college granted its first bachelors degrees.

Not long after, in 1919, the school shortened its title to its current moniker, Greensboro College. The college would not become coeducational, however, until 1954. In 1968, Greensboro formed a consortium of local colleges—the Greensboro Tri-College Consortium—with Guilford College and Bennett College. Other later partnerships would be added with Elon College and Salem College.

In December 2025 the university was placed on Warning status but with continued accreditation by its educational accreditor, the Southern Association of Colleges and Schools, after the accreditor's board found significant non-compliance with its standards for financial responsibility, qualified staff and financial controls.

== Campus ==
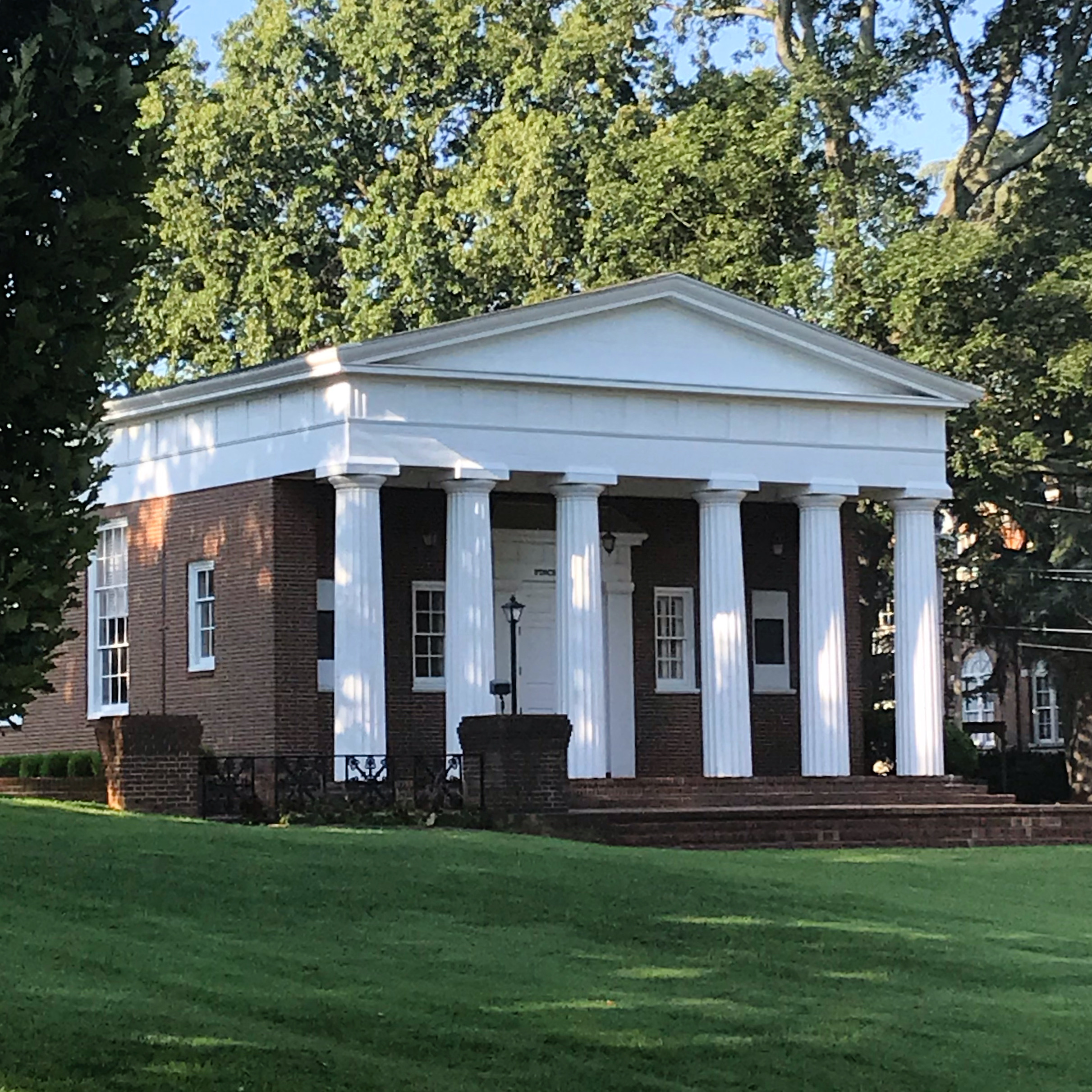
Finch Memorial Chapel

Located in the College Hill Historic District of Greensboro, North Carolina, the college's properties include several buildings of interest. Most are red-brick buildings built in a neoclassical revival or colonial styles. However, the most historic buildings are located around the campus quadrangle.

The oldest building and the administrative center of Greensboro College is the Main Building, housing the offices of the president, senior administrative officers, and important departments. The building also hosts the Brock Historical Museum, which displays artifacts relating to the history of the college as well as its relationship with the United Methodist Church.

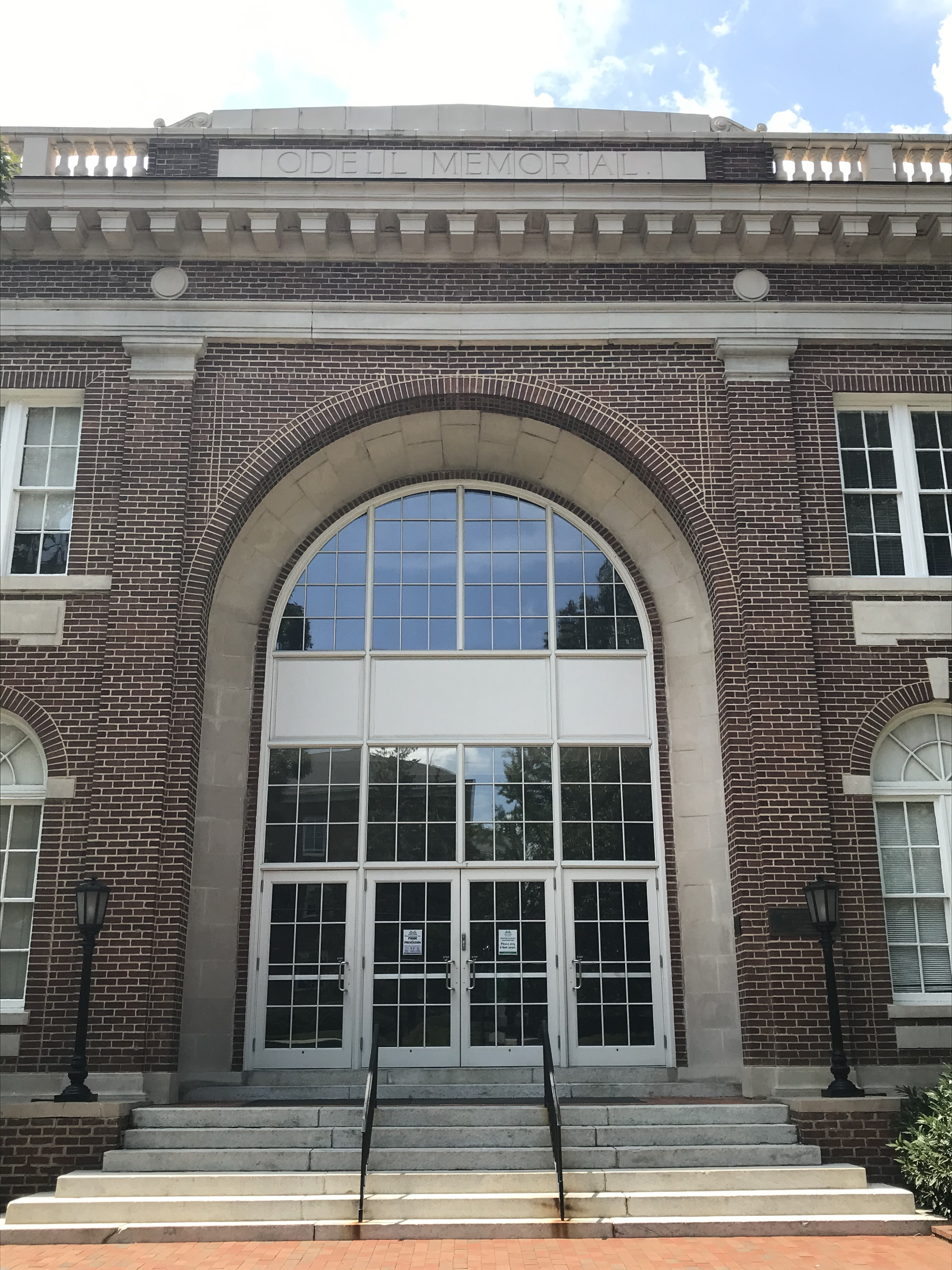
Odell Memorial Building

The Finch Memorial Chapel was built in 1954 and is the worshiping heart of the college community. It is named after Hannah Brown Finch, an 1885 graduate and wife of Thomas J. Finch, the latter of whom was involved with Thomasville Furniture Industries and politics. Chapel services are held every Thursday.

The J.A. Jones Library is the bibliographic heart of the college community. Named after James Addison Jones, it houses the college's library collections. The building is also home to the Levy-Loewenstein Holocaust Collection, the First Citizens Bank Global Communications Center, and the Sternberger Cultural Center, the latter of which includes a 100-seat lecture hall.

The Cowan Humanities Building houses the offices of the Art and English/Communications departments, as well as a large lecture hall and several art galleries, including the Anne Rudd Gaylon Gallery, the Irene Cullis Gallery, and the LIFT Gallery. The building is also home to Middle College.

The Odell Memorial Building houses the offices of the performing arts departments, such as Theater and Music, and the 787-seat Huggins Performance Center. The building was built in 1922, but renovated in 1997 after a substantial donation from business leader Kenneth Lenon Huggins. The performance center is named after Huggins' wife, Gail.

Proctor Hall houses the offices of most academic departments while also containing classrooms and seminar rooms of various sizes. It consists of two buildings, an east and a west building. Proctor Hall – East houses science laboratories and the offices of the Biology, Chemistry, Business, and Accounting Departments. Proctor Hall – West is where offices of other departments, such as the humanities and social sciences, are located. The Hall, first built in 1950, was named after Fred and Myrtle Proctor. The Proctors donated the funds necessary to renovate and update the halls in 1998.

== Academics ==
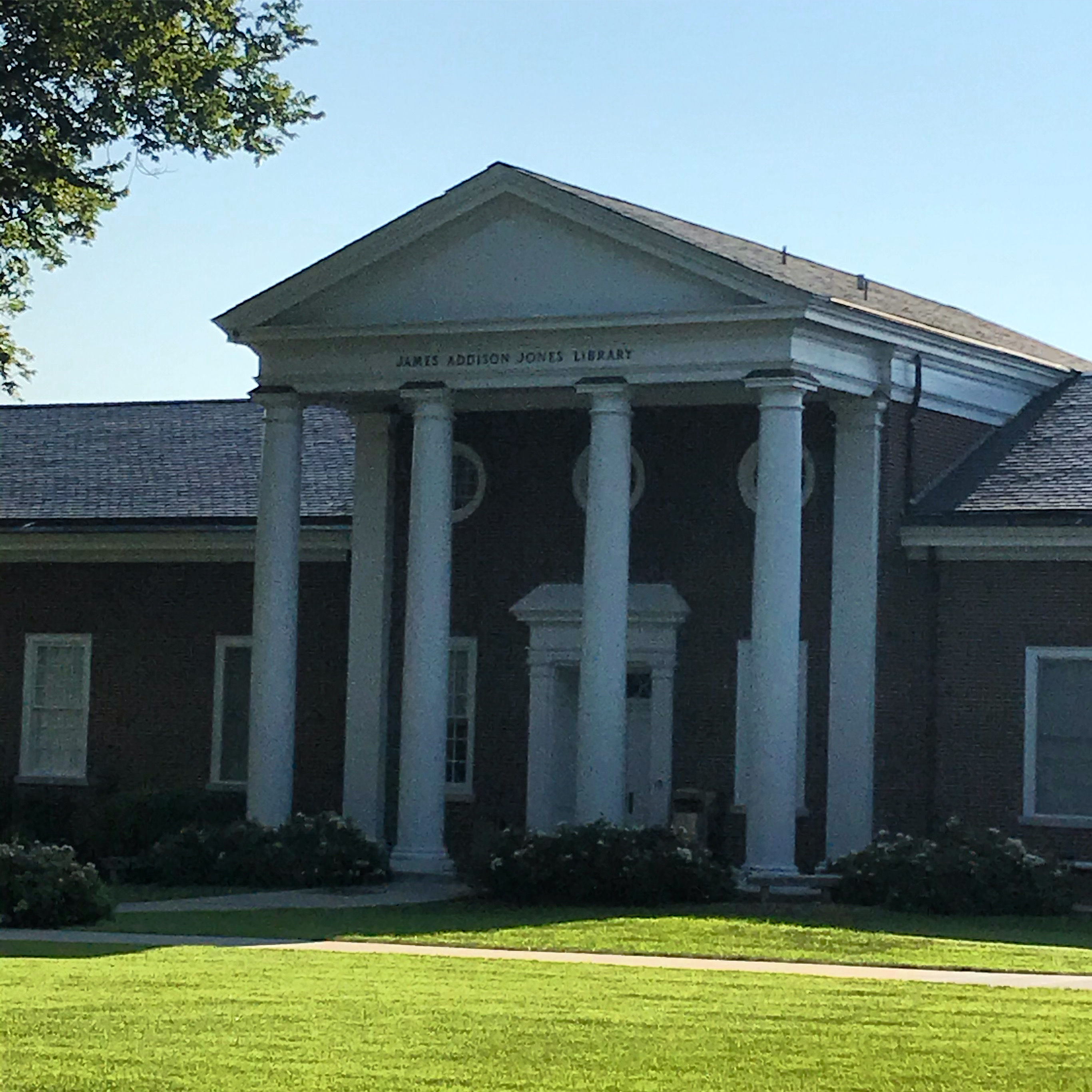
J.A. Jones Library

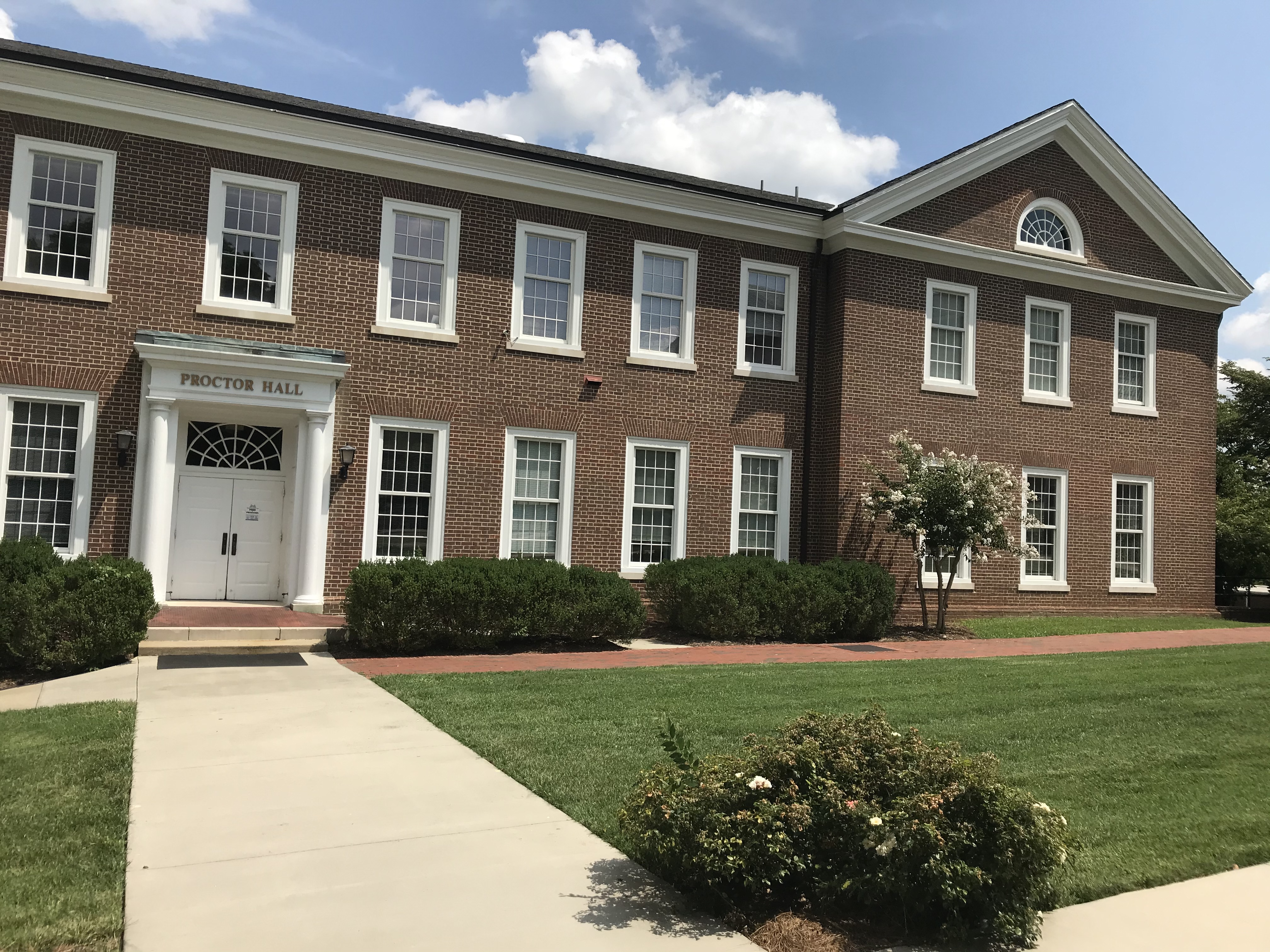
Proctor Hall – West

Academic programs are organized across five different schools, the School of Arts, the School of Business, the School of Humanities, the School of Science and Mathematics, and the School of Social Sciences and Education. Greensboro College offers four undergraduate degrees – Bachelor of Arts, Bachelor of Business Administration, Bachelor of Music, and Bachelor of Science – across 42 undergraduate majors and 26 minors. The academic calendar consists of two semesters and a summer-school session. Full-time undergraduates must carry a minimum academic load of 12 credit hours per semester.

Additionally, the college offers five Master of Arts degrees, four in education and one in theology, ethics, and culture.

=== Honors program and academic honor societies ===
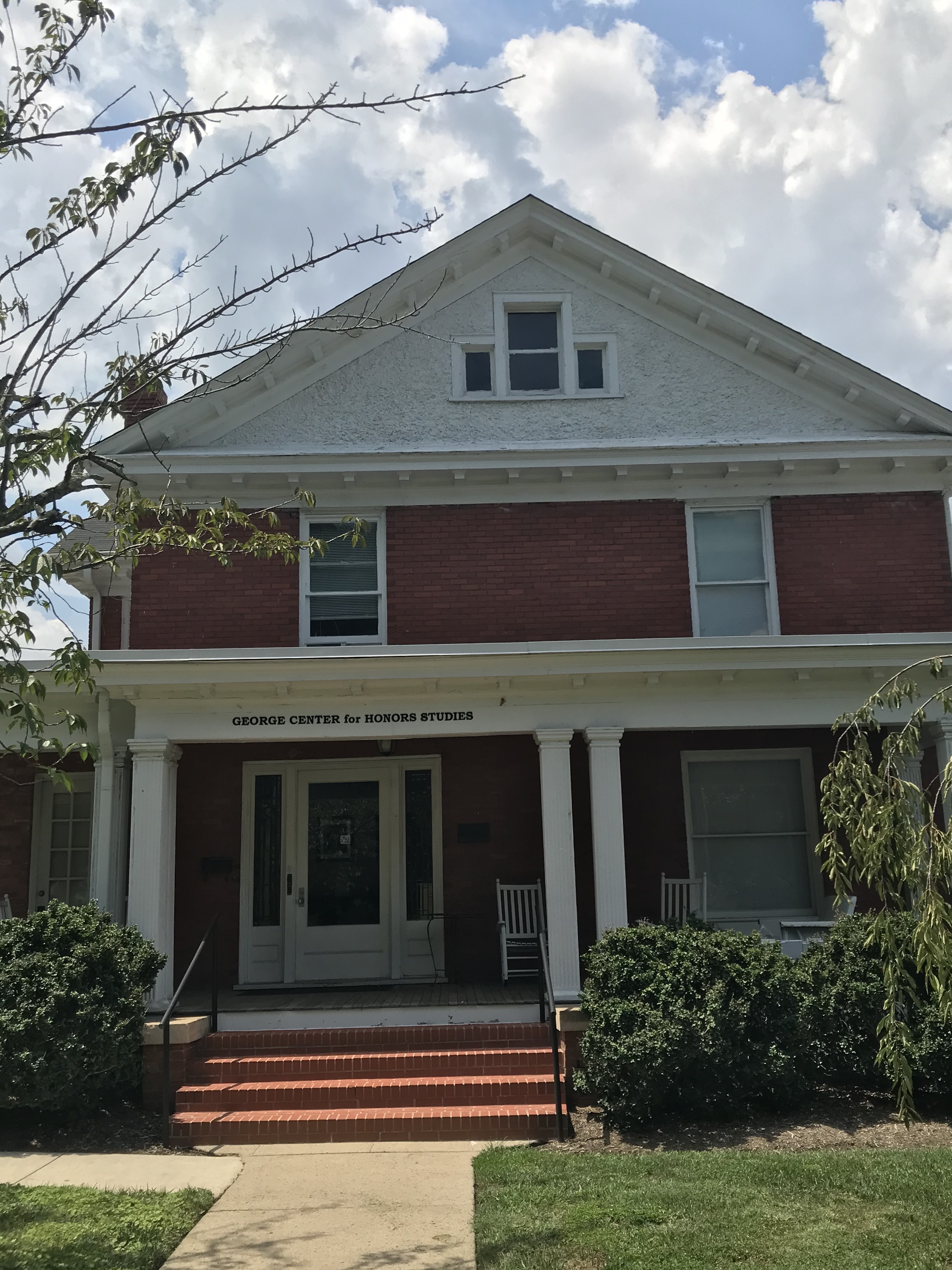
George Center for Honors Studies

The George Center for Honors Studies welcomes accepted students whose high school GPA is at least 3.65 and whose SAT score is at least 1240 or ACT Composite score is at least 26. They are interviewed prior to being determined for suitability for the program. Honors students must complete a thesis to graduate. The student committee of the program also organizes extracurricular activities and outings for Honors students. The Honors Program is housed in the Honors House, just north of the Cowan Humanities Building.

Greensboro College also has local chapters of the following national honor societies:

- Alpha Chi, a national honor society recognizing superior academic achievement
- Alpha Kappa Delta, national sociology honor society
- Beta Beta Beta, national biology honor society
- Delta Mu Delta, international business honor society
- Kappa Delta Pi, international education honor society
- Phi Alpha Theta, national history honor society
- Pi Delta Phi, international French honor society
- Pi Sigma Alpha, national political science honor society
- Psi Chi, national psychology honor society
- Sigma Delta Pi, national Spanish honor society
- Sigma Tau Delta, international English honor society
- Theta Alpha Kappa, national religion honor society

== Athletics ==
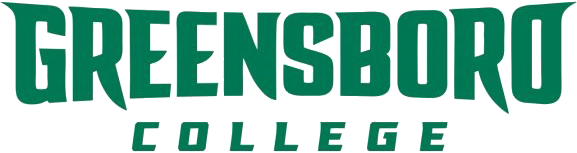
Greensboro athletics wordmark

The Pride's athletic program competes in the NCAA's Division III and the USA South Athletic Conference. It offers 19 intercollegiate sports. Men's sports include baseball, basketball, football, golf, lacrosse, soccer, swimming, wrestling and tennis. Women's sports include basketball, cross country, golf, lacrosse, soccer, softball, swimming, tennis, triathlon, and volleyball.

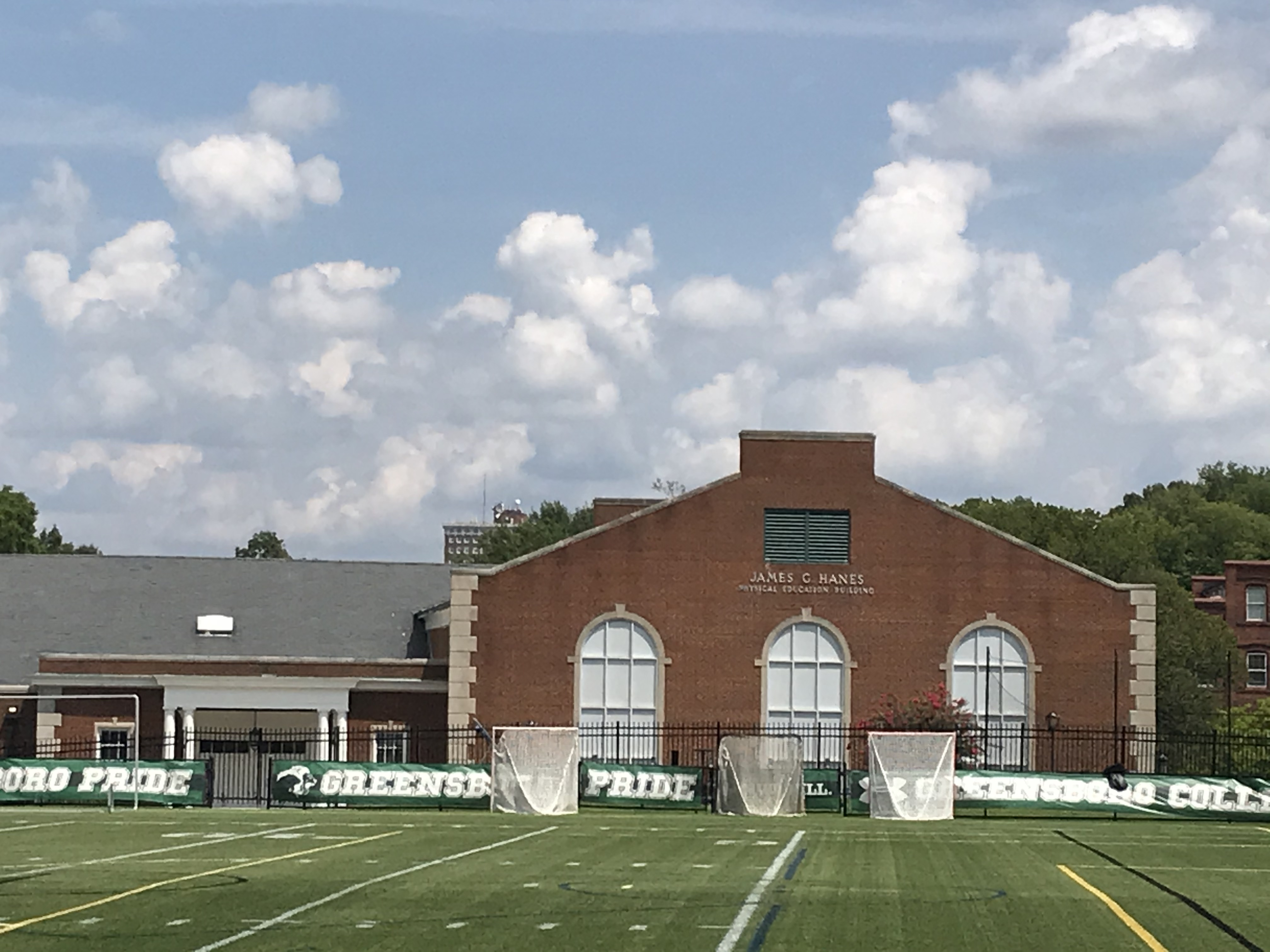
Hanes Physical Education Building

The men's golf team has twice won the NCAA Division III national championship, winning in 2000 and 2011.

The women's basketball team won the USA South Conference championship, earning an NCAA Division III tournament bid in 2023.

Women's soccer saw one of their own players, Mercedes Bauzá, chosen to play for the Puerto Rico women's national football team in 2018.

As of the beginning of the 2011–2012 school year, 77 Pride student-athletes had been named All-Americans and 26 had been named Academic All-Americans.

== Middle College ==
Greensboro College Middle College (GMC) is a high school program on the campus of Greensboro College located in Greensboro, North Carolina. It schools the 11th and 12th grades, and allows students to finish their high school career while earning college credit. GMC's main focus is to provide a more flexible learning environment for students previously unsuccessful or dissatisfied with traditional high school.

== Notable alumni ==
- Eugenia Jones Bacon, novelist
- Mercedes Bauzá, professional soccer player
- Sallie Southall Cotten, writer and clubwoman
- Mildred Stafford Cherry, First Lady of North Carolina
- Sarah Dessen, novelist (attended)
- Eileen Fulton, soap opera and Broadway actress
- Jon Hardister, politician
- Musette Satterfield Kitchin, First Lady of North Carolina
- Heather Macy, basketball coach
- Carolyn Maloney, politician
- Ryan Nelsen, professional soccer player and coach (attended)
- Stephanie Paulsell, professor and minister
- Sarah Lowe Twiggs, poet
