= Thomas Guy House =

Historic house in North Carolina, United States

- U.S. National Register of Historic Places
- Location within North Carolina Location within the United States
- Location: NC 2135 N side, 0.3 miles W of jct. with NC 2142, near Mebane, North Carolina
- Coordinates: 36°00′34″N 79°16′06″W
- Area: 25 acres (10 ha)
- Built: c. 1890
- Built by: Guy, Thomas; Nash, Andrew
- MPS: Log Buildings in Alamance County MPS
- NRHP reference No.: 93001195
- Added to NRHP: November 22, 1993

Thomas Guy House is a historic home located near Mebane, Alamance County, North Carolina. It was built about 1890, and is a one-story saddlebag plan log house. It consists of two individual one-room log pens that share a common central chimney.

It was added to the National Register of Historic Places in 1993.
