= Paisley-Rice Log House =

Historic house in North Carolina, United States

- U.S. National Register of Historic Places
- Location within North Carolina Location within the United States
- Location: N of Mebane, near Mebane, North Carolina
- Coordinates: 36°7′33″N 79°15′22″W
- Area: 65 acres (26 ha)
- Architectural style: Continental Plan
- NRHP reference No.: 79001740
- Added to NRHP: January 31, 1979

Paisley-Rice Log House is a historic home located near Mebane, Orange County, North Carolina. It believed to date to the late-18th century. The log dwelling is composed of two sections and follows the three-room Quaker plan, or Continental Plan. Located between the two sections is a chimney. The interior features vernacular Georgian woodwork.

It was listed on the National Register of Historic Places in 1979.
