= Mebane Commercial Historic District =

Historic district in North Carolina, United States

- U.S. National Register of Historic Places
- U.S. Historic district
- Location within North Carolina Location within the United States
- Location: Bounded by N. 3rd, E. Center, N. 4th, & W. Clay Sts., Mebane, North Carolina
- Coordinates: 36°05′49″N 79°16′07″W
- Area: 5 acres (2.0 ha)
- Built: 1905
- Architectural style: Colonial Revival, Neoclassical
- NRHP reference No.: 11000952
- Added to NRHP: December 22, 2011

Mebane Commercial Historic District is a national historic district located at Mebane, Alamance County, North Carolina. It encompasses 30 contributing buildings, and 1 contributing structure in the central business district of Mebane. The district includes one and two-part commercial blocks of one to three stories in height, executed in the Colonial Revival and Neo-Classical styles. The earliest buildings date to about 1905. Notable buildings include two former banks (c. 1910, c. 1919), the Five Star Building (c. 1910), Mebane Enterprise Building (c. 1940), and Jones Department Store Building (c. 1910).

It was added to the National Register of Historic Places in 2011.
