= Old South Mebane Historic District =

Historic district in North Carolina, United States

- U.S. National Register of Historic Places
- U.S. Historic district
- Location within North Carolina Location within the United States
- Location: Bounded by Holt, S. 1st, S. 5th, Austin, E. Wilson, & Roosevelt Sts.; also 400 blocks of W. Lee & W. McKinley Sts., 507 S. 4th St., 600-800 blocks of S. 5th St., Mebane, North Carolina
- Coordinates: 36°05′33″N 79°16′17″W
- Area: 161 acres (65 ha)
- Built: c. 1900
- Architectural style: Queen Anne, Colonial Revival, Craftsman, Minimal Traditional, Period Cottage, and Ranch styles
- NRHP reference No.: 11000953, 13000933 (Boundary Increase)
- Added to NRHP: December 22, 2011, December 16, 2013 (Boundary Increase)

Old South Mebane Historic District is a national historic district located at Mebane, Alamance County, North Carolina. It encompasses 308 contributing buildings in a primarily residential section of Mebane. The district primarily includes one- to two-story frame residences in a variety of vernacular and popular architectural styles including Colonial Revival, American Craftsman, and Queen Anne styles. The earliest dwellings date to about 1900.

It was added to the National Register of Historic Places in 2011, with a boundary increase in 2013.
