= Eastern Alamance High School =

Location
- 4040 Mebane Rogers Road; Mebane, North Carolina; United States; 36°06′48″N 79°18′10″W

Information
- Type: Public
- Motto: Family
- Established: 1962 (64 years ago)
- School district: Alamance-Burlington School System
- CEEB code: 342575
- Principal: Suzanne Simpson
- Teaching staff: 56.84 (on FTE basis)
- Grades: 9–12
- Enrollment: 952 (2024–2025)
- Student to teacher ratio: 19.75
- Colors: Green and gold
- Mascot: Eagle
- Nickname: EA
- Yearbook: SIGNA
- Website: www.abss.k12.nc.us/o/eahs

Eastern Alamance High School is a public high school located in Mebane, North Carolina, United States. It is one of eight high schools in the Alamance-Burlington School System. The school runs on block scheduling from 8:45 am to 3:45 pm. They are currently running on a 4-block school day with semester long courses. Students can choose between eight total classes a year.

== Notable alumni ==
- Mercedes Bauzá — former member of the Puerto Rico women's national soccer team
- Allen Crowder — former UFC fighter
- JamesOn Curry — professional basketball player
- Don Kernodle — former pro wrestler with the National Wrestling Alliance
- Zack Littell — MLB pitcher
- Junior Robinson — professional basketball player
