= Goose Lake Prairie State Natural Area =

State park in Illinois, USA

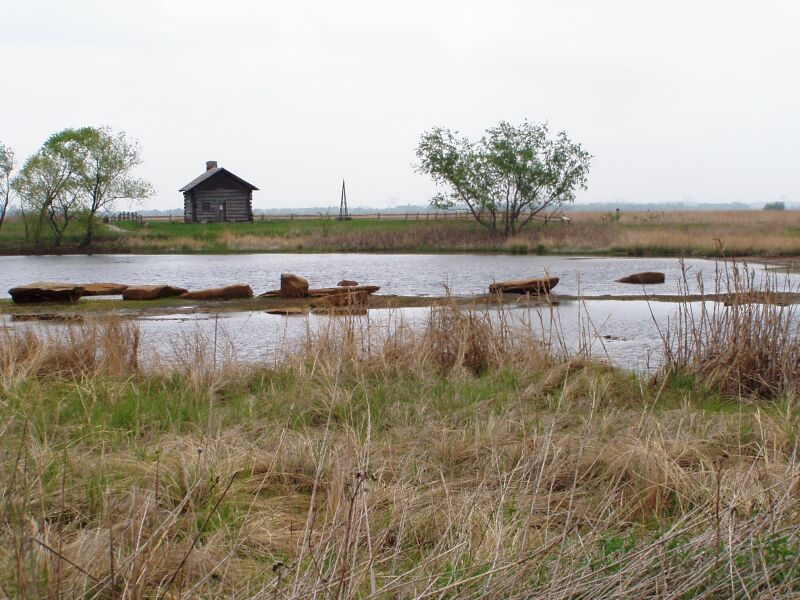
- Cragg Cabin at Goose Lake Prairie

- Location within Illinois Location within the United States
- Location: Grundy County, Illinois, U.S.
- Nearest city: Morris, Illinois
- Coordinates: 41°22′03″N 88°17′50″W
- Area: 2,537 acres (1,027 ha)
- Governing body: Illinois Department of Natural Resources

Goose Lake Prairie State Natural Area is a 2,537-acre (1,027 ha) state park in Illinois. More than half of the state park is a tallgrass prairie maintained as an Illinois Nature Preserve. It is located in Grundy County near the town of Morris approximately 50 miles (80 km) southwest of Chicago.

== Ecosystem ==
The Goose Lake region formed in the post-Wisconsin glaciation period as a flat, wet area dominated by layers of sand and silt laid down by postglacial outwash. The Des Plaines River and Kankakee River converge near here to form the Illinois River.

Until heavily exploited for its natural resources during the 19th and early 20th centuries, the Goose Lake area was a stable wetland, with swathes of prairie grass surrounding the shallow Goose Lake. The region is in the Central forest-grasslands transition ecoregion.

The Goose Lake area has historically been a favorite place for hunting, fishing, and gathering, with geese, ducks, and other waterfowl; a wide variety of fish and shellfish; and wet-footed game such as beaver and muskrat.

== History ==
While the flat, alluvial soil of this riparian bottomland was intensely fertile, the lack of adequate drainage made the land of the Goose Lake country unsuitable for subdivision for agriculture. A different fate awaited much of it.

The poorly drained sediment under and adjacent to Goose Lake was rich in clay. Starting as early as the 1820s, the sticky clay was extensively dug by settlers. Some of them were trained potters; they fired the clay in kilns to create pieces of earthenware for frontier farm and household needs. The potters' settlement was called Jugtown, and the road to the park's visitor center is called Jugtown Road to this day. A few pieces of Jugtown earthenware have been saved by collectors, and some of the larger claypits can be seen today. Frontiersmen also dug ditches through the clay to partly drain the wet prairie for pastureland. Soil too damp for crops could be used for cattle.

Local drainage activity peaked in 1890, when local farmers formed a drainage district and cooperated to drain Goose Lake. The area's defining geographical feature disappeared and was replaced by damp farmland and wet pastureland. The drainage was a partial failure; if it had been a success, the remaining patches of prairie would have disappeared under the plow. Today, the park's Marsh Loop Trail passes over part of the bed of the vanished lake.

Underneath the clay were thin veins of coal, dug from the beginning by the farmers and potters for local use. In the second half of the 1800s, regional coal mining increased to supply fuel to the growing city of Chicago. The main line of the Santa Fe Railroad was built adjacent to the prairie land, and the mines built spur tracks into the coal field to haul the coal to customers. Industrial strip mining, with motorized shovels, began in 1928. The miners left piles of tailings in the southern section of the remaining prairie, further altering the landscape.

The area was further altered after World War II with the construction of two great electrical generating plants, the oil-burning Collins Station and the nuclear-powered Dresden Nuclear Power Plant (1960). The Collins plant was constructed in conjunction with an adjacent 2,000-acre (810 ha) artificial pond, Heidecke Lake, dug to serve as a cooling pond for the generating plant. Heidecke Lake today serves as much of the northern boundary of Goose Lake Prairie. Ironically, the hand of man had destroyed one lake in the Illinois River bottomland, Goose Lake, and then created another, Heidecke Lake.

== Preservation ==
The first 250 acres (100 ha) of Goose Lake was purchased by Illinois for nature preservation purposes in 1969. The addition of additional parcels created the present-day Goose Lake Prairie State Natural Area. The remaining patches of tallgrass prairie had been extensively altered by human activity during the preceding 150 years, but active management began to re-knit these patches into a unified swathe of natural grassland.

In 1998, two sites in the park were added to the National Register of Historic Places, White and Company's Goose Lake Stoneware Manufactury and White and Company's Goose Lake Tile Works.

Unlike many of Illinois's state parks, Goose Lake Prairie is not primarily managed for hunting; visitors are encouraged to enjoy a tallgrass prairie ecosystem, dominated by grasses such as big bluestem, Indian grass, and switchgrass, and by flowering forbs such as compass plants, coneflowers, goldenrod, shooting stars, and violets. The state park's workers and managers maintain a seven-mile network of trails throughout the park. Some of the park's patches of mature grassland sprout blades up to eight feet in height.

The patches of old-growth tallgrass prairie that have survived to the present day serve as a biotic refuge for many species that can live nowhere else, especially prairie-endemic moths and butterflies. Some rare prairie plants are especially adapted to feed and be fertilized by equally rare prairie insects. Lepidopterists have found the papaipema moth, previously thought to be extinct, fluttering about Goose Lake Prairie's forbs and flowers.

The Cragg Cabin, a c. 1838 log cabin originally built in nearby Mazon, Illinois, has been relocated to Goose Lake Prairie as a tribute to the frontier heritage of the Prairie State. Together with the nearby Midewin National Tallgrass Prairie, Goose Lake Prairie is a reminder of the tens of thousands of acres of tallgrass prairie that once lived in Illinois.

Goose Lake Prairie has been listed as an Important Bird Area of Illinois.

Goose Lake Prairie State Natural Area is accessible from Exit 240 on Interstate 55.
