= Cross Roads Presbyterian Church and Cemetery and Stainback Store =

Historic site in Alamance County, North Carolina, US

- U.S. National Register of Historic Places
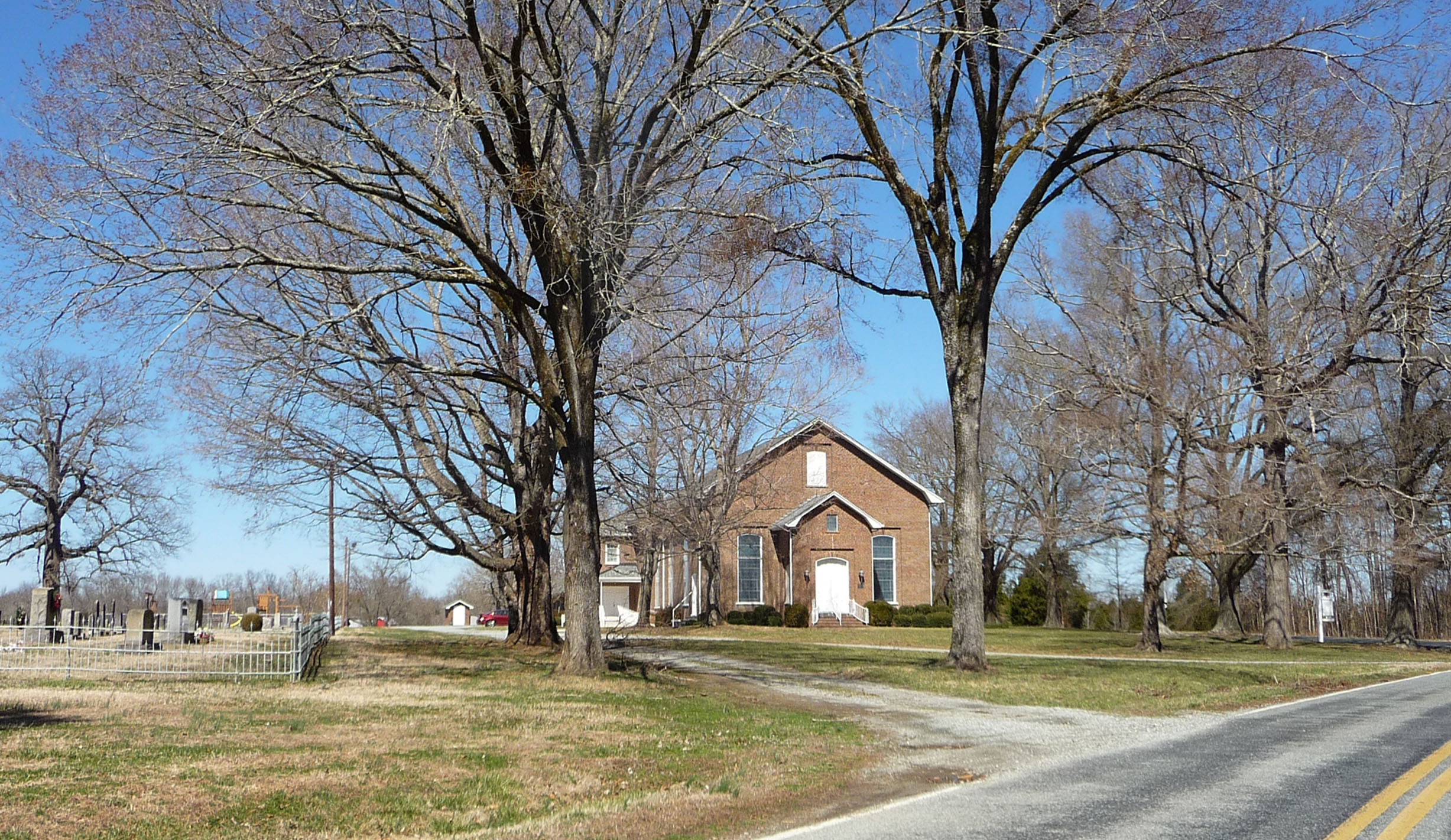
- Crossroads Presbyterian Church, March 2014

- Location within North Carolina Location within the United States
- Location: N of Mebane at SR 1910 and SR 1912, near Mebane, North Carolina
- Coordinates: 36°10′12″N 79°17′11″W
- Area: 7 acres (2.8 ha)
- Built: 1876
- NRHP reference No.: 84001912
- Added to NRHP: May 22, 1984

Cross Roads Presbyterian Church and Cemetery and Stainback Store are historic buildings near Mebane, Alamance County, North Carolina. The church was built in 1876, and is a 1 1/2-story, brick vernacular church building. The Stainback Store, across from the church, was built about 1888, and is a simple two-story gable front frame structure built from materials of the original church building and session house from about 1792. Located near the church is the contributing cemetery established about 1792.

It was added to the National Register of Historic Places in 1984.
