= Cooper School (Mebane, North Carolina) =

Historic school building in North Carolina, United States

- U.S. National Register of Historic Places
- Location within North Carolina Location within the United States
- Location: S side of SR 2143, E of jct. with SR 2142, near Mebane, North Carolina
- Coordinates: 35°59′30″N 79°16′19″W
- Area: 1.5 acres (0.61 ha)
- Built: c. 1900
- NRHP reference No.: 86003451
- Added to NRHP: December 15, 1986

Cooper School is a historic one-room school building for African-American students located near Mebane, Alamance County, North Carolina. It was built about 1900, and is a one-story, three-bay, frame building. It has a tin gable-front roof and is sheathed in plain weatherboard. The school continued to operate until 1907 when a larger educational facility, the Oaks School, was built nearby.

It was added to the National Register of Historic Places in 1986.
