= Durham Hosiery Mill No. 15 =

- U.S. National Register of Historic Places
- Location within North Carolina Location within the United States
- Location: 301 W. Washington St., Mebane, North Carolina
- Coordinates: 36°05′48″N 79°16′25″W
- Area: 5.53 acres (2.24 ha)
- Built: 1922
- NRHP reference No.: 10001054
- Added to NRHP: December 27, 2010

Durham Hosiery Mill No. 15, also known as Mebane Yarn Mills, Inc. and Rockfish-Mebane Yarn Mills, Inc., is a historic hosiery mill building located at Mebane, Alamance County, North Carolina. It was built in 1922, and is a two-story, 20-bay, cast-in-place concrete mill building. Two-story concrete pilasters define each window bay. It features a centrally-placed, two-story, projecting square tower. A nine bay addition was built in 1966. The mill closed in 2001.

It was added to the National Register of Historic Places in 2010.
