= Henderson Scott Farm Historic District =

Historic farm in North Carolina, United States

- U.S. National Register of Historic Places
- U.S. Historic district
- Location within North Carolina Location within the United States
- Location: Jct. of NC 119 and SR 2135, near Mebane, North Carolina
- Coordinates: 36°02′23″N 79°19′53″W
- Area: 197.9 acres (80.1 ha)
- Built: 1836
- Architectural style: Greek Revival, Federal
- NRHP reference No.: 87000411
- Added to NRHP: September 16, 1987

Henderson Scott Farm Historic District is a historic farm and national historic district located near Mebane, Alamance County, North Carolina. It encompasses 10 contributing buildings on a farm near Mebane. The district includes the Federal style First Henderson Scott House (1836), Greek Revival style Second Henderson Scott House (1849), smokehouse (c. 1849), garage (1918), milk/butter House (c. 1900), Henderson Scott Store (1855), sheep barn (c. 1850), dairy barn 1 (c. 1935), chicken house (c. 1926), and wellhouse (c. 1926).

It was added to the National Register of Historic Places in 1987.
