= Griffis-Patton House =

Historic house in North Carolina, United States

- U.S. National Register of Historic Places
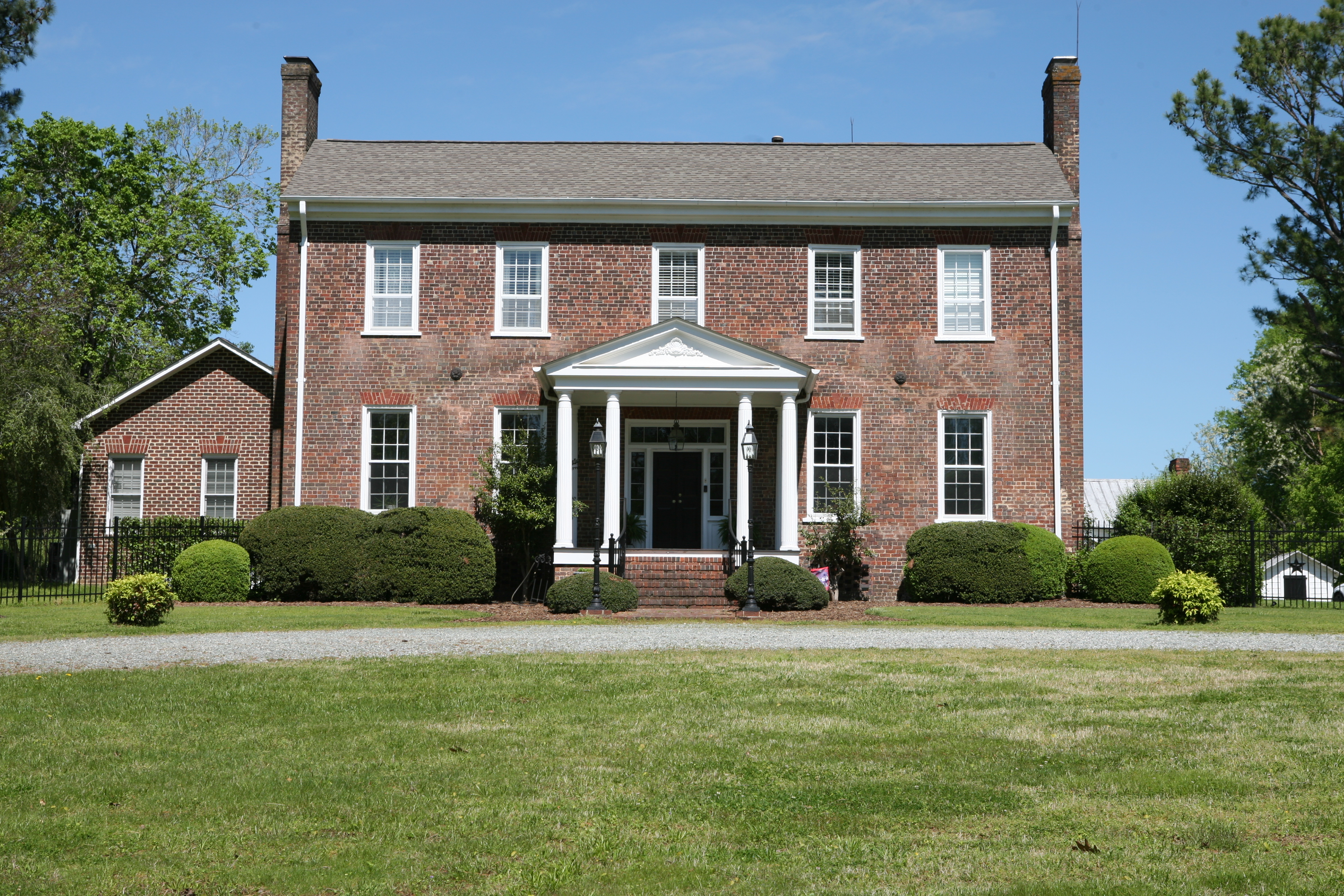
- Front view of the house in 2020

- Location within North Carolina Location within the United States
- Location: NW of Melbane on SR 1927, near Mebane, North Carolina
- Coordinates: 36°07′01″N 79°19′03″W
- Area: 10.2 acres (4.1 ha)
- Built: 1839-1840
- Architectural style: Greek Revival
- NRHP reference No.: 83001835
- Added to NRHP: March 17, 1983

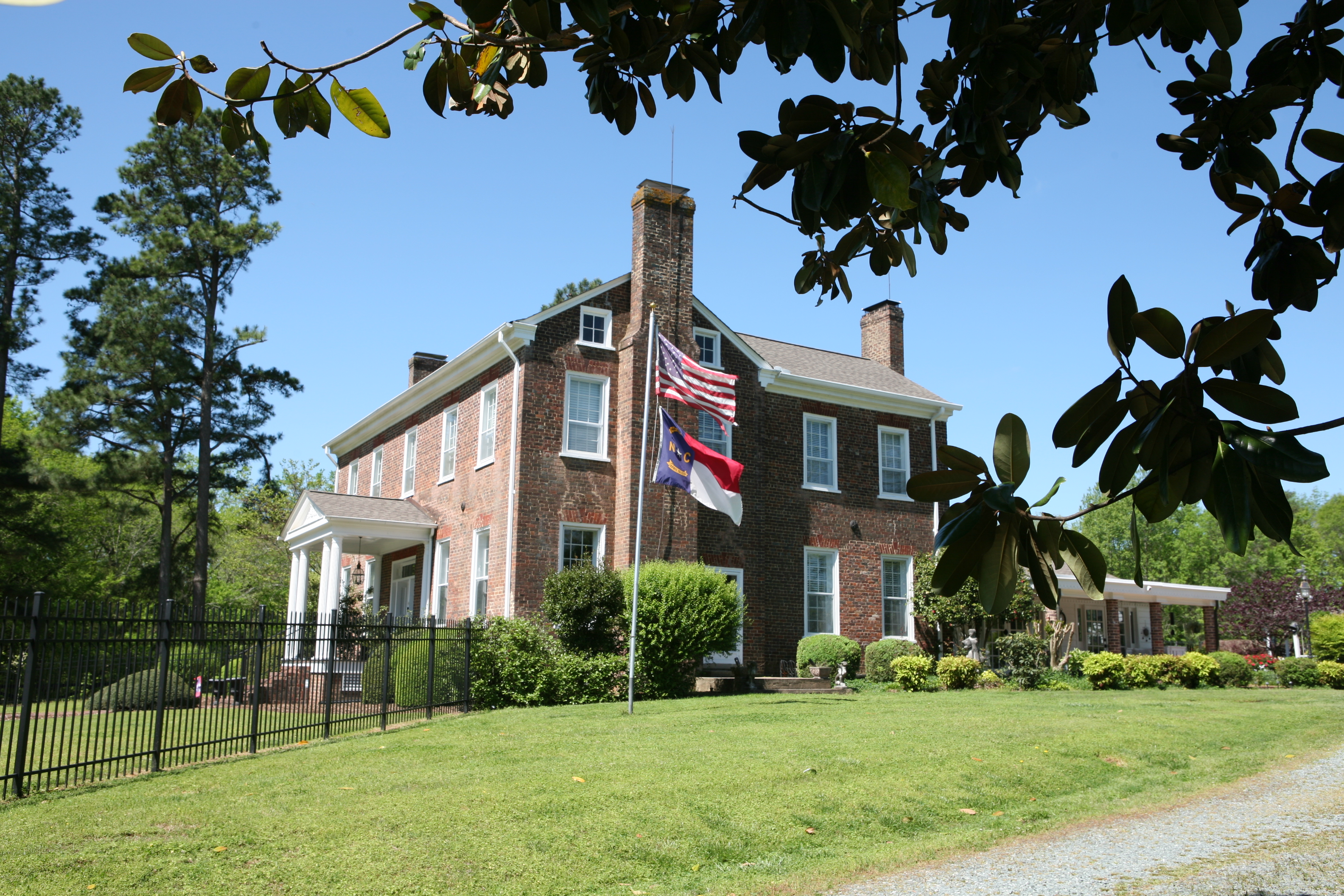
Griffis-Patton House - Side View

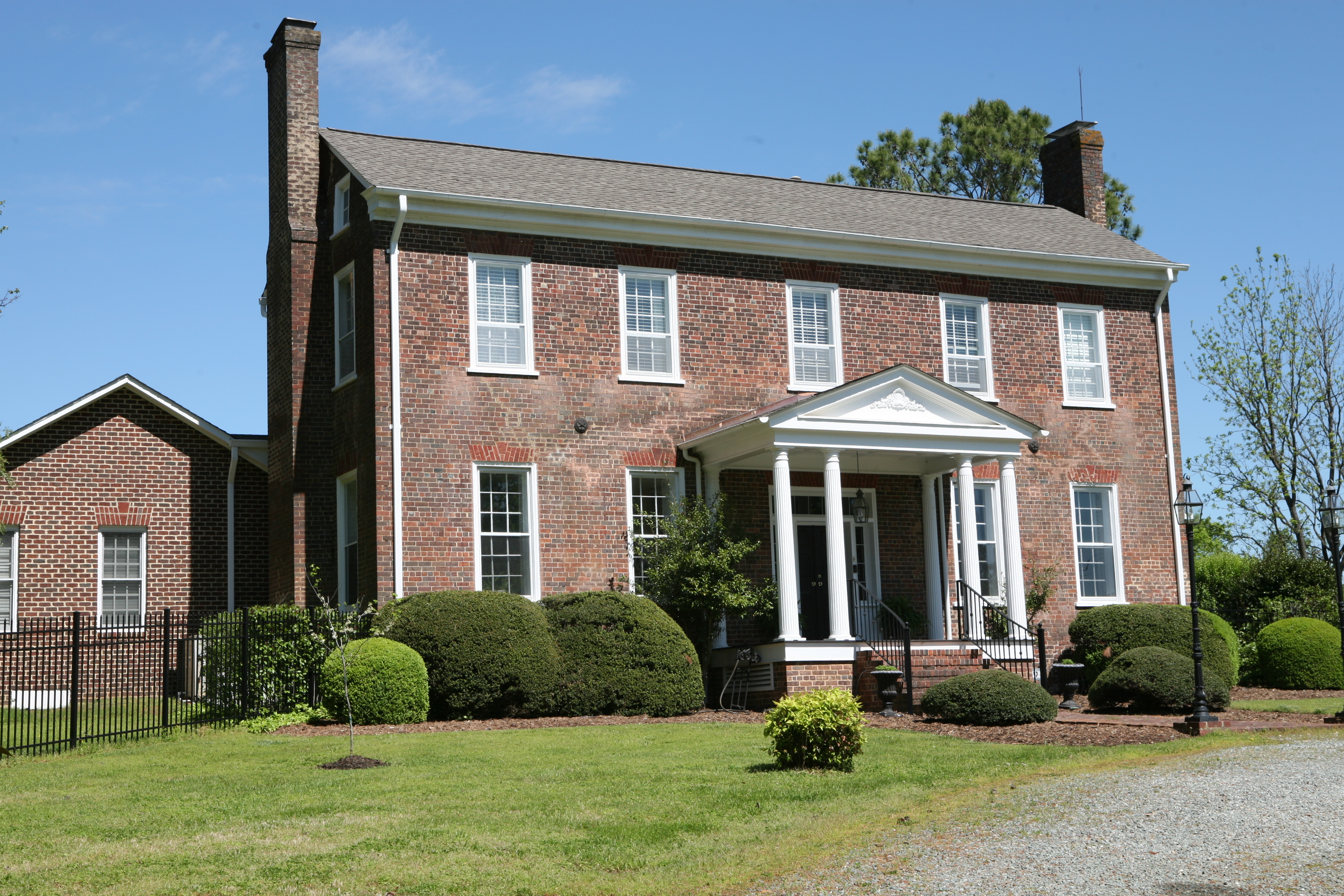
Griffis-Patton House - Left Front View

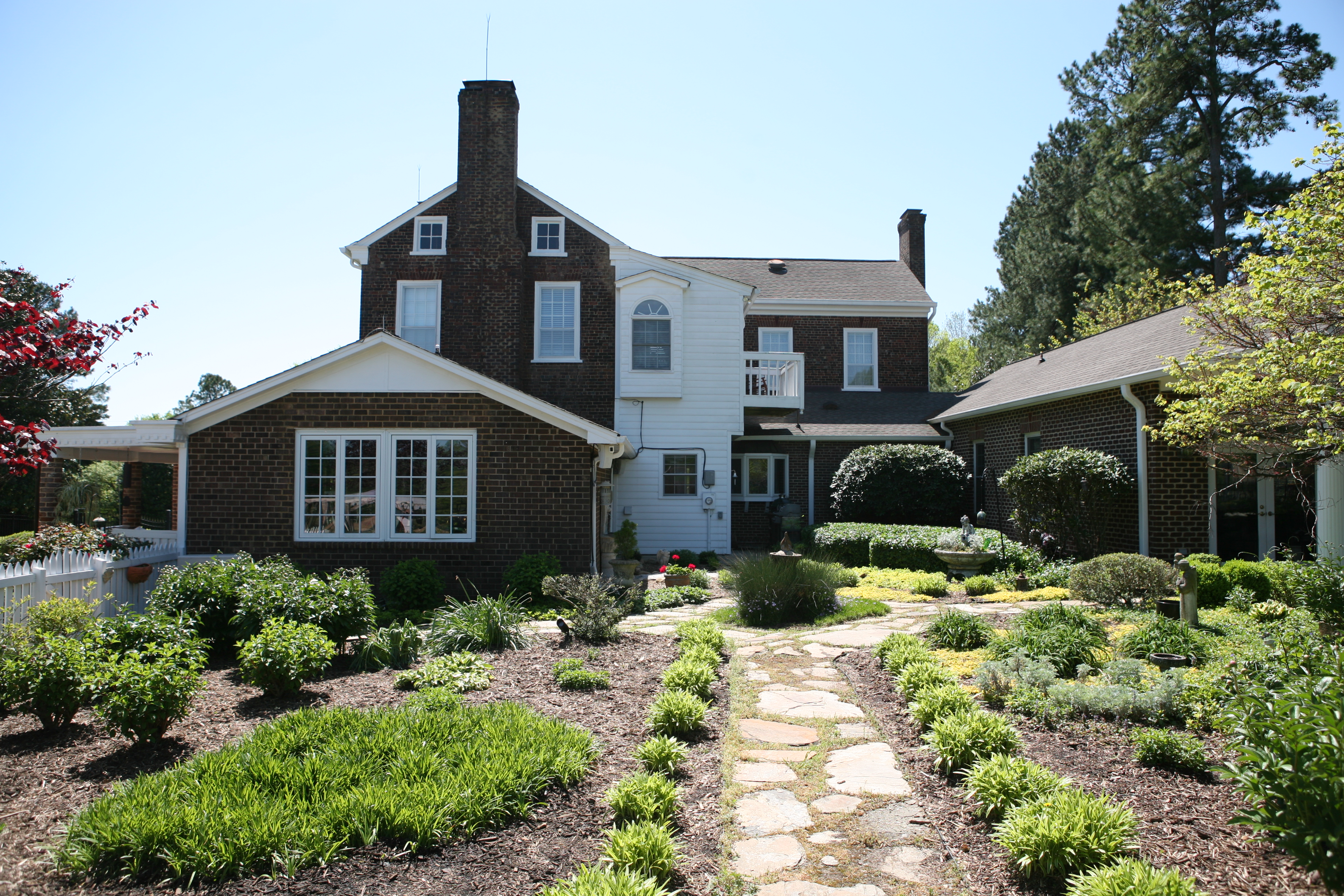
Griffis-Patton House - Garden View

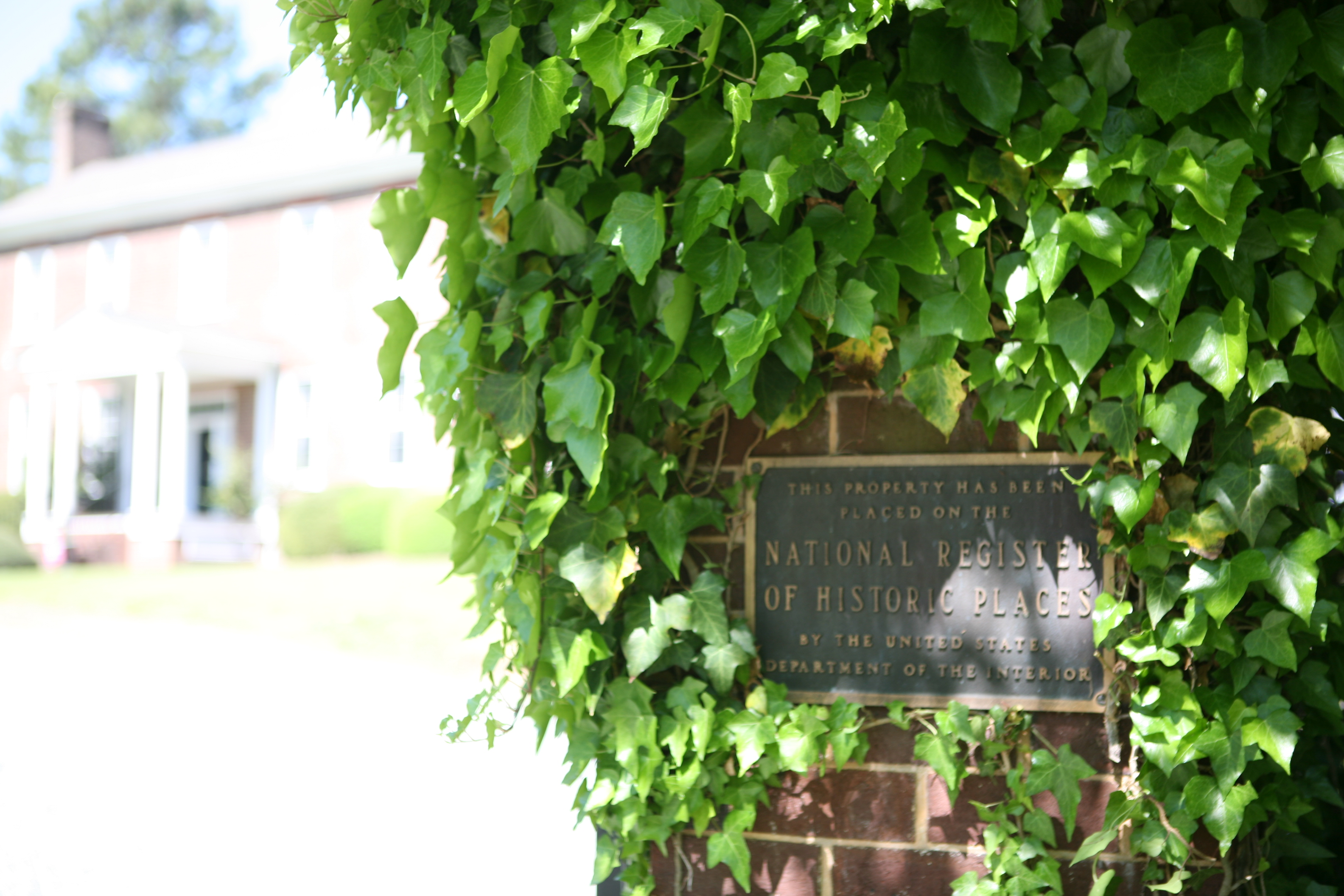
Griffis-Patton House - National Register of Historic Places

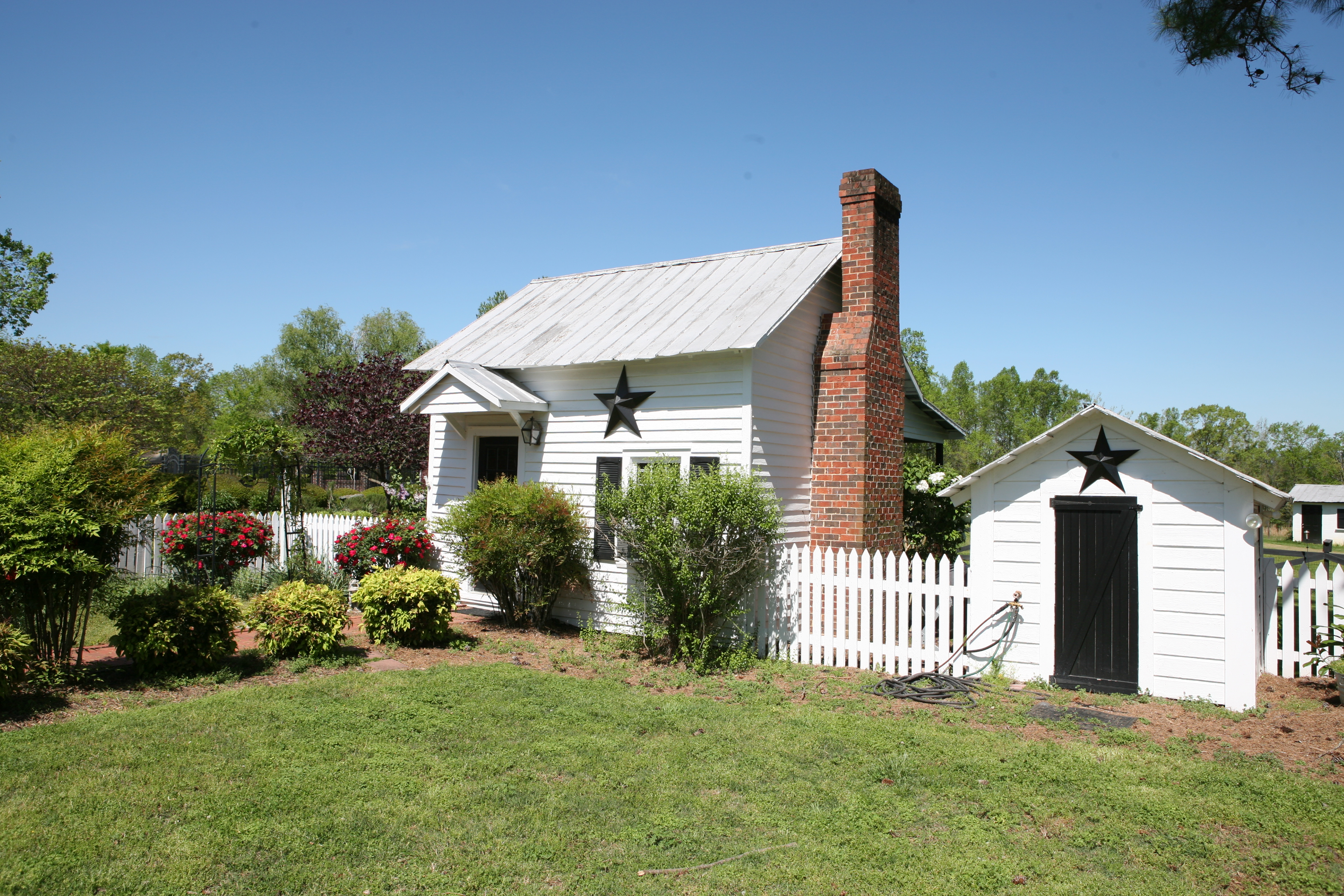
Griffis-Patton house - Original Outdoor Kitchen

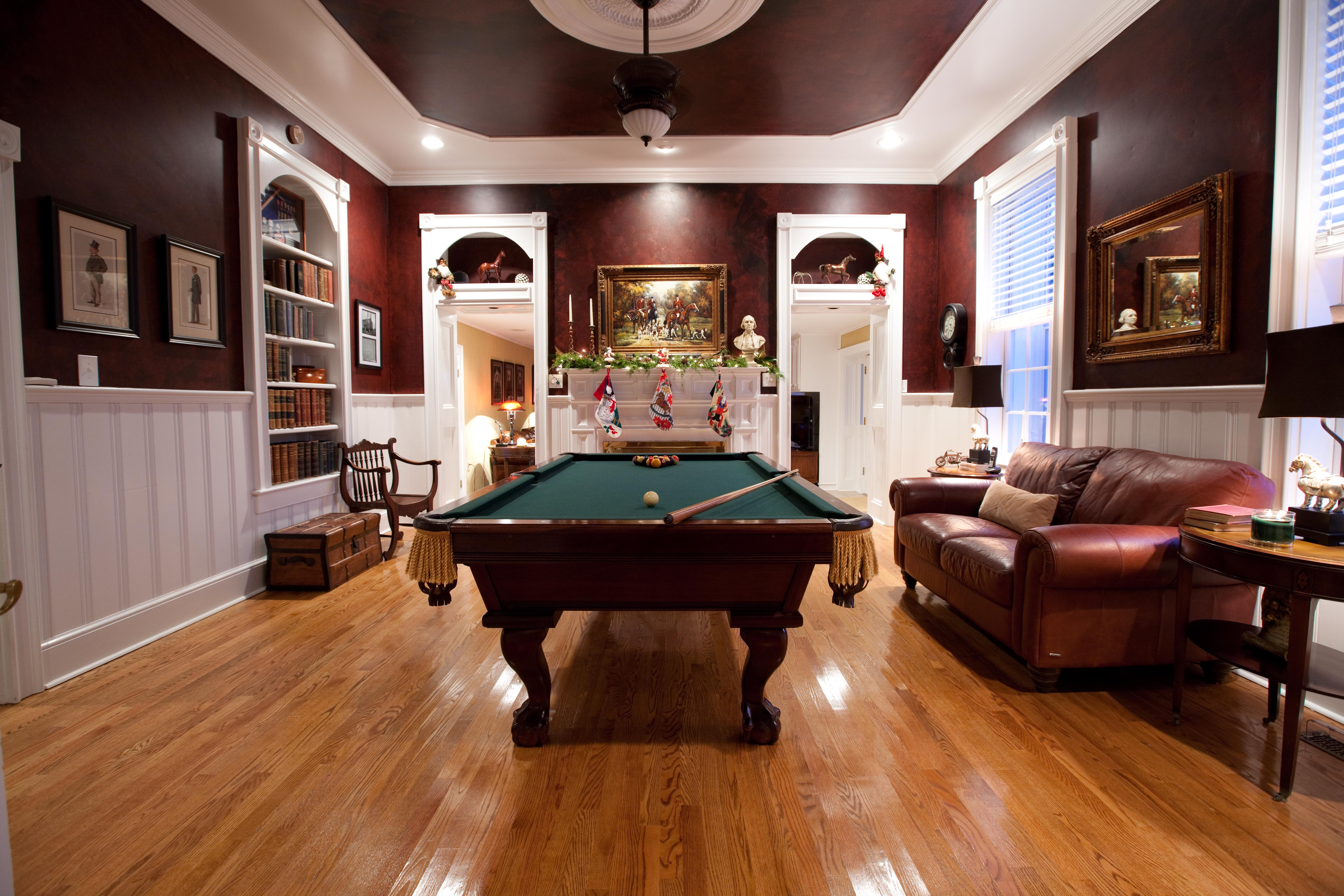

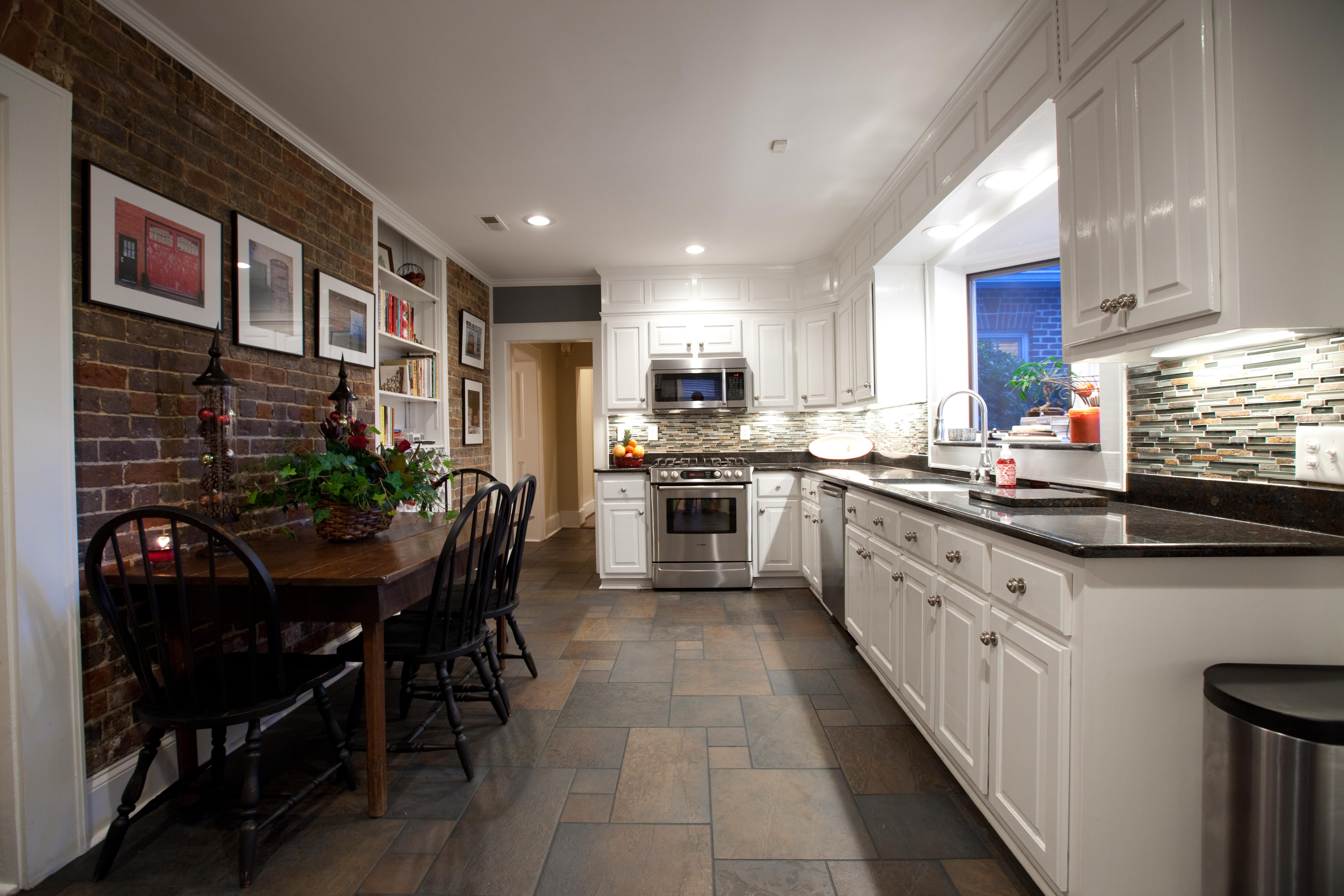
Kitchen - Harvest HomeTour - 2011

Griffis-Patton House is a historic plantation house located near Mebane, Alamance County, North Carolina. It was built in 1839–1840, and is a two-story, five-bay, brick Greek Revival style house. The front facade features a single story entrance porch with four original, rounded brick columns. Also on the property are the contributing one-story frame kitchen, a small one-story well house, and a small one-story frame shed roof chicken house, now used as a wood shed.

It was added to the National Register of Historic Places in 1983.

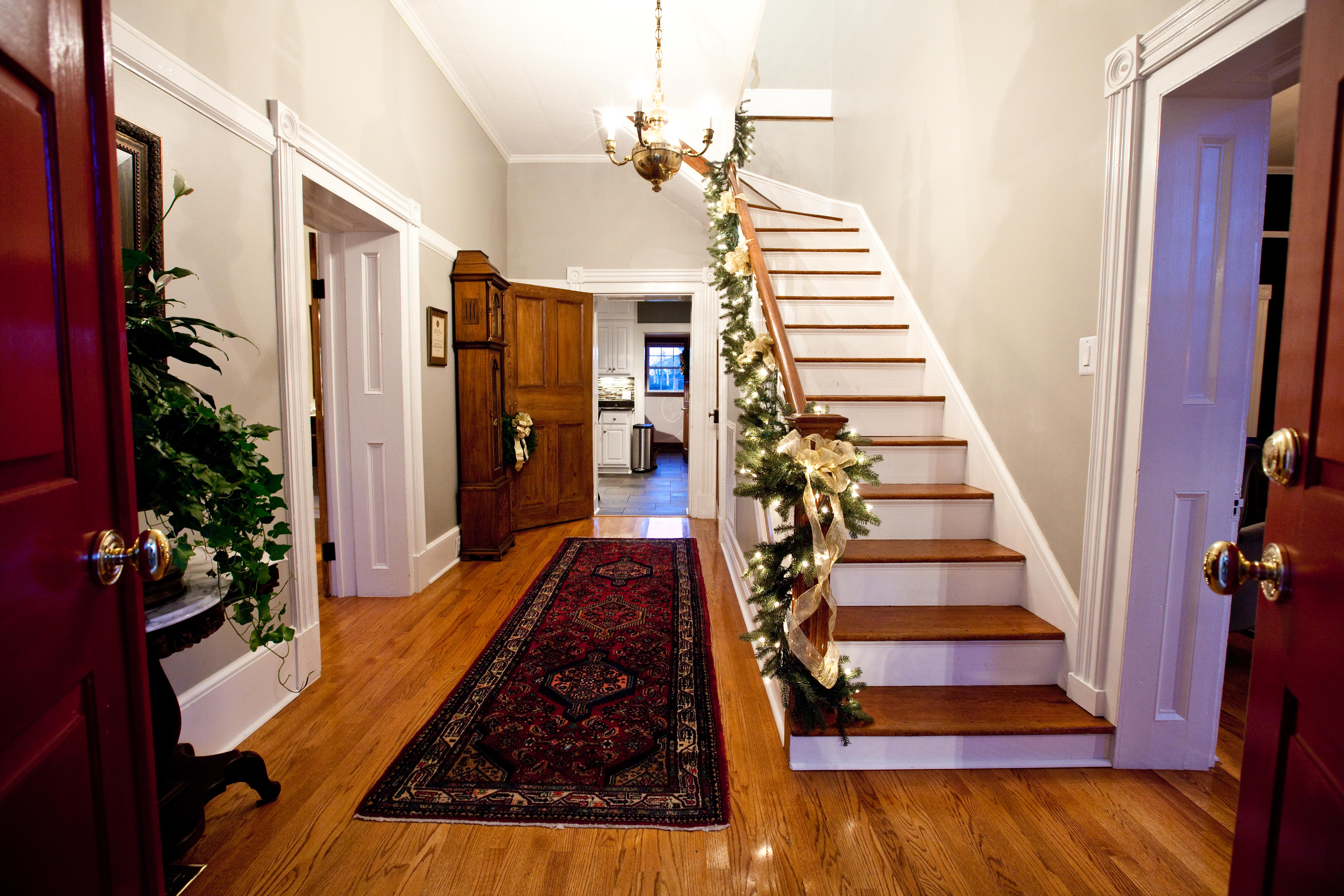
