= Pleasant Grove, Alamance County, North Carolina =

Pleasant Grove
- Unincorporated community
- Location of Pleasant Grove in North Carolina Pleasant Grove (the United States)
- Coordinates: 36°11′31″N 79°19′36″W
- Country: United States
- State: North Carolina
- County: Alamance
- Elevation: 712 ft (217 m)
- Time zone: UTC-5 (Eastern (EST))
  - Summer (DST): UTC-4 (EDT)
- Area code: 919
- GNIS feature ID: 992457

Pleasant Grove is an unincorporated community in Alamance County, North Carolina, United States.

Pleasant Grove is located at the intersection of North Carolina Highway 49 and North Carolina Highway 62 in the northeastern part of Alamance County.

== History ==
A post office operated from 1815 to 1908.

Tobacco crops from nearby farms were processed in Pleasant Grove during the early 20th century.

Pleasant Grove High School was built in 1922 to serve white students in grades eight to ten. It became an elementary school in 1962, and closed in 1971 to comply with county desegregation requirements. Parts of the school were later demolished, though the cafeteria/gym wing remained and today function as the Pleasant Grove Community Center.

== Notable person ==
- JamesOn Curry - NBA player
