= White and Company's Goose Lake Tile Works =

Archaeological site in Illinois, United States

- U.S. National Register of Historic Places
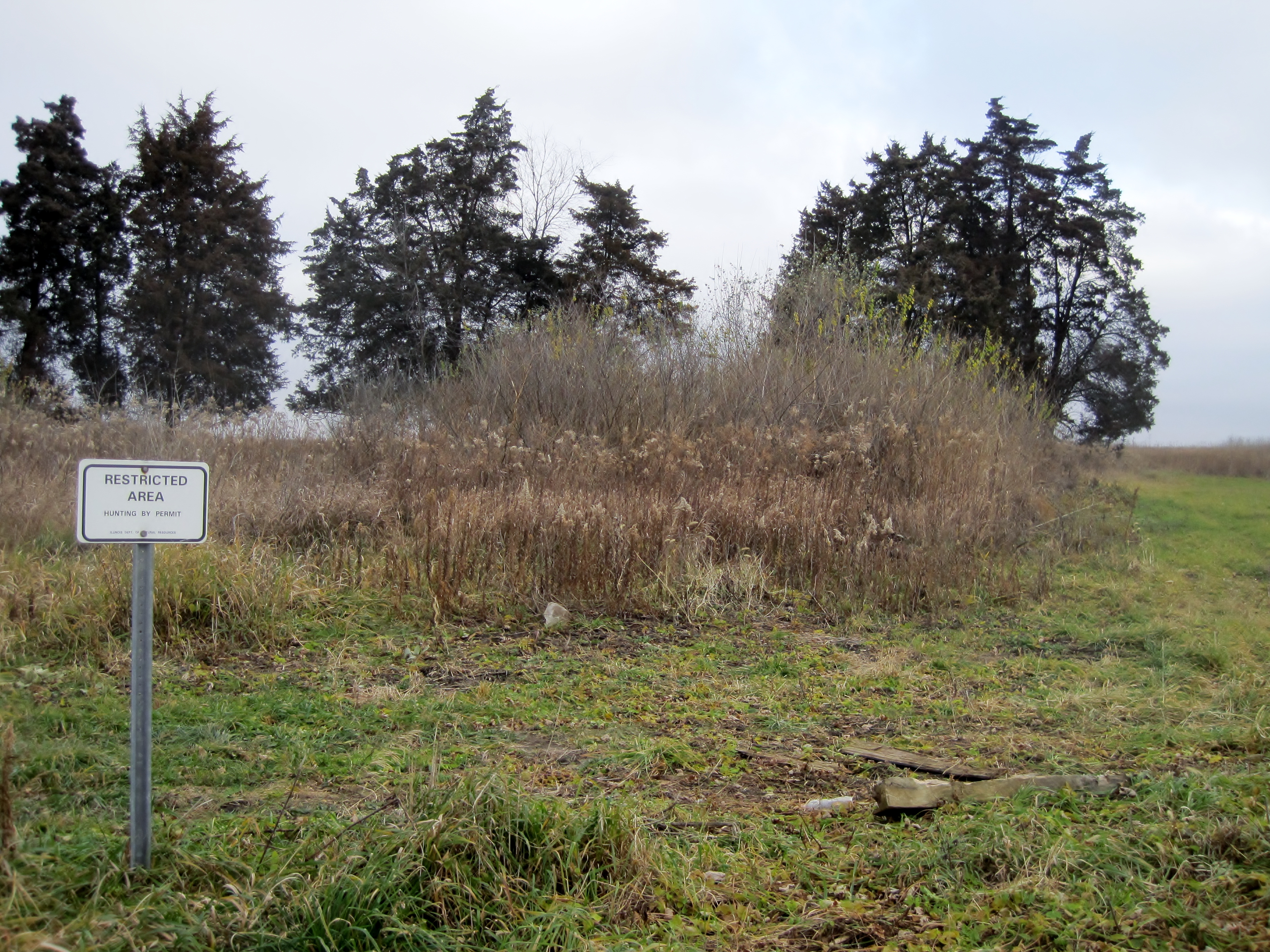
- The site of the tile works in 2010

- Location within Illinois Location within the United States
- Location: 5010 N. Jugtown Rd., Morris, Illinois
- Coordinates: 41°20′44″N 88°19′02″W
- Area: 2.7 acres (1.1 ha)
- Built: 1855
- NRHP reference No.: 98000976
- Added to NRHP: August 6, 1998

White and Company's Goose Lake Tile Works is an archaeological site located at 5010 N. Jugtown Rd. in the Goose Lake Prairie State Natural Area, near Morris, Illinois. The site, as well as the nearby stoneware manufactury site, was part of a large White and Company plant used to manufacture stoneware and tile. The tile works, which operated from 1855 until 1865, was one of the earliest attempts at large-scale drainage tile production in Illinois. White and Company chose the site due to the abundance of clay around Goose Lake, which it used in its products. Due to the large number of workers employed by the company, a town called Jugtown was settled nearby; the town reached a population of 114 by 1860. The tile works site now mainly consists of waste products from tile production, including tile fragments and kiln furniture.

The site was added to the National Register of Historic Places on August 6, 1998.
