= Junior Robinson (basketball) =

American basketball player (born 1996)

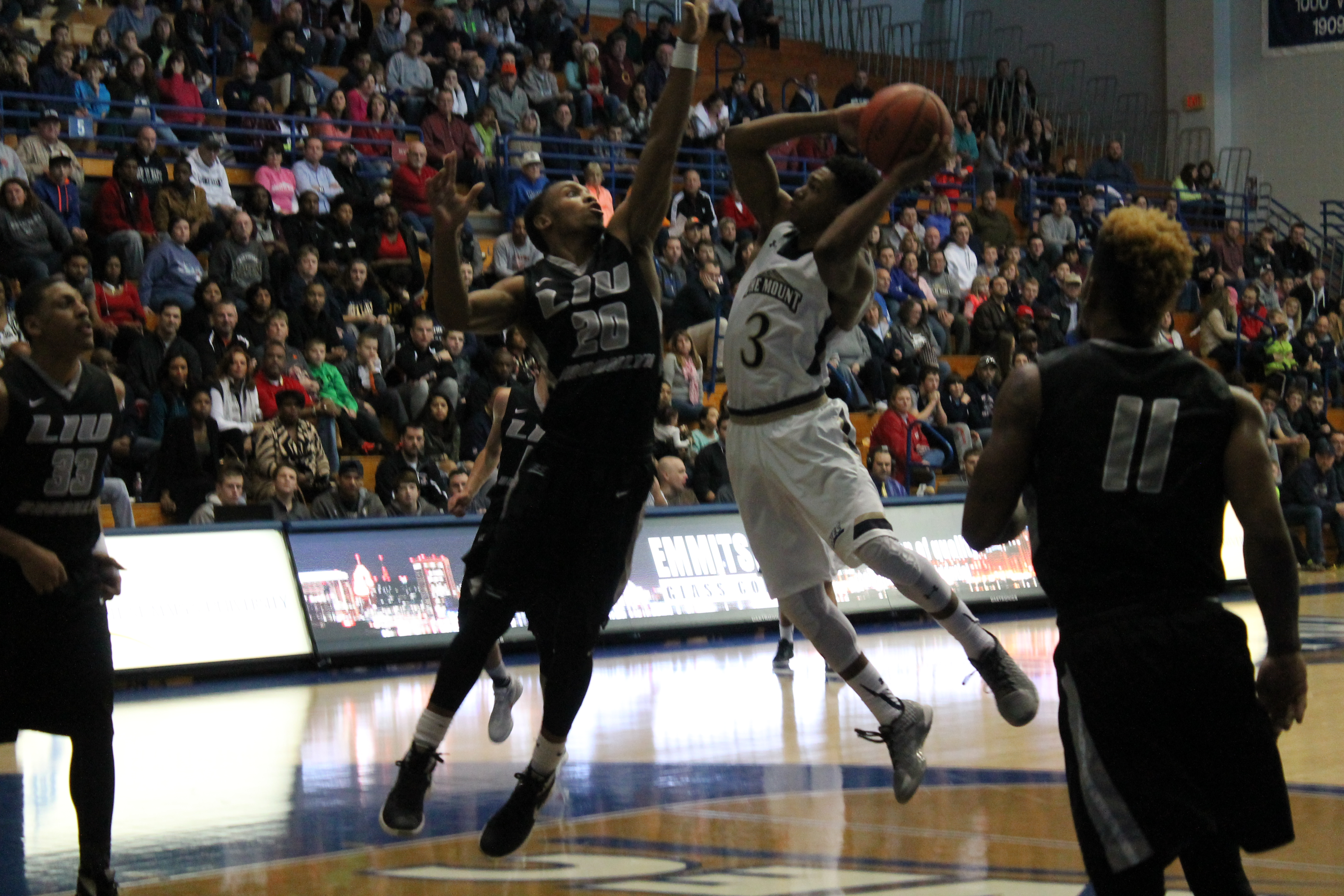
- Robinson (#3) is defended by LIU-Brooklyn's Aakim Saintil

Free agent
- Position: Point guard

Personal information
- Born: February 15, 1996 (age 30) Mebane, North Carolina, U.S.
- Listed height: 5 ft 5 in (1.65 m)
- Listed weight: 150 lb (68 kg)

Career information
- High school: Eastern Alamance (Mebane, North Carolina)
- College: Mount St. Mary's (2014–2018)
- NBA draft: 2018: undrafted
- Playing career: 2018–present

Career history
- 2018–2019: Sáenz Horeca Araberri
- 2020: Grupo Alega Cantabria CBT
- 2020–2021: Kipinä Basket
- 2022–2023: Raiffeisen Panthers Fürstenfeld
- 2023–2024: BBC Monthey-Chablais

Career highlights
- NEC Player of the Year (2018); First-team All-NEC (2018)

Steve Lamont "Junior" Robinson, Jr. (born February 15, 1996) is an American basketball player who last played for BBC Monthey-Chablais of the Swiss Basketball League (SBL). He played college basketball for Mount St. Mary's. He was born in Mebane, North Carolina.

== College career ==
Robinson, a 5'5 guard, attended Eastern Alamance High School and scored 2,228 points in his career, 17th in North Carolina high school history. Despite being one of the shortest players in college basketball, he averaged 8.2 points per game as a freshman and was named to the NEC all-rookie team. He scored 12.6 points per game and was named to the Second Team All-Northeast Conference as a sophomore.

As a junior, Robinson averaged 14.1 points per game and led Mount St. Mary's to the NCAA tournament as a 16 seed. He scored 23 points on 9-for-14 shooting in the First Four win against New Orleans. Robinson repeated on the Second Team All-Northeast Conference that year. As a senior, Robinson averaged 22.0 points and 4.8 assists per game and led the Mountaineers to a second-place finish in conference play. He earned five Northeast Conference Player of the Week mentions. After the regular season he was named NEC Player of the year, the second Mount St. Mary's player to be so honored.

== Professional career ==
After going undrafted in the 2018 NBA draft, Robinson signed with the Atlanta Hawks for NBA Summer League. On August 22, 2018, Robinson signed with Sáenz Horeca Araberri of the LEB Oro. In his professional debut on October 6, he scored 47 points against Melilla, the second-most points in a single game in league history.

After missing the beginning of the season with a knee injury, Robinson signed with Grupo Alega Cantabria CBT of the LEB Plata. In the end of 2020 he signed for Kipinä Basket for the rest of the 2020-2021 season.

On October 27, Robinson signed with the Greensboro Swarm, but was waived on November 6.

== Career statistics ==
Legend
GP	Games played	GS	Games started	MPG	Minutes per game
FG%	Field goal percentage	3P%	3-point field goal percentage	FT%	Free throw percentage
RPG	Rebounds per game	APG	Assists per game	SPG	Steals per game
BPG	Blocks per game	PPG	Points per game	**Bold**	Career high

=== College ===
Year	Team	GP	GS	MPG	FG%	3P%	FT%	RPG	APG	SPG	BPG	PPG
2014–15	Mount St. Mary's	30	29	24.5	.362	.333	.753	1.4	3.3	.9	**.1**	8.2
2015–16	Mount St. Mary's	33	32	28.8	.385	.342	.839	1.8	3.1	**1.2**	.0	12.5
2016–17	Mount St. Mary's	**36**	**34**	33.4	.423	**.398**	.868	1.6	2.9	.9	**.1**	14.1
2017–18	Mount St. Mary's	32	32	**36.3**	**.446**	.388	**.899**	**2.9**	**4.8**	**1.2**	.0	**22.0**
Career		131	127	30.9	.413	.372	.857	1.9	3.5	1.0	.1	14.3
