= Charles Barrett (climber) =

American rock climber (b. 1984)

Personal information
- Born: 1984 (age 41–42) California, U.S.
- Occupation: Professional rock climber

Climbing career
- Type of climber: Bouldering; Sport climbing; Traditional climbing; Big wall climbing
- Highest grade: Bouldering: V13 (8B)
- Updated on May 30, 2026

Charles Barrett (born 1984), is a former professional American rock climber who was sentenced to life in jail by a United States federal court for multiple sexual assaults in Yosemite National Park.

== Climbing career ==
Barrett grew up in Santa Rosa, California and was known for pioneering some of the most difficult boulder problems in the state at grades of up to V13 (8B), with his hardest boulder ascent being his repeat of The Mandala SDS at grade V13 (8B). He was also strong in sport climbing, traditional climbing and in big wall climbing, climbing several routes at the grade of 5.14 (8c/+).

Barrett published multiple climbing guidebooks on climbing areas in Yosemite National Park and the Eastern Sierra, and was a friend of American free solo climber Alex Honnold, who described him as "a very strong, naturally talented climber". A 2016 Climbing article on Barrett called him a longtime climbing partner of American boulder climber Kevin Jorgeson.

== Criminal conviction ==
The assaults that Barrett was convicted of occurred in August 2016 when the 19-year old victim was on a hiking trip to the park. He lured her into a remote area and then committed rape. Three other women also alleged that he assaulted them, dating back to 2008, but these crimes were alleged to have occurred outside of federal jurisdiction so the court did not pursue them. She reported the crimes in 2020, he was arrested in 2022, and the case went on trial in February 2024. The jury found him guilty. Prosecutor Phillip Talbert submitted a report at sentencing saying that Barrett had "no remorse or regret". Barrett maintained his innocence and said that he was "victim of a false persecution" and his accusers were "random girls saying whatever they wanted". His attorneys called the life sentence excessively harsh and promised to appeal it.

Barrett was convicted of criminal harassment in 2022 for a years-long pattern of behavior against one of his other alleged sexual assault victims. During a period of several years, he had fourteen protective orders against him filed by four women who said they feared for their lives. In December 2025, his life sentence was upheld by an appeals court.
