= Woodlawn School (Mebane, North Carolina) =

Historic school building in North Carolina, United States

- U.S. National Register of Historic Places
- Location within North Carolina Location within the United States
- Location: N side NC 1921 0.15 miles W of jct. with NC 1920, near Mebane, North Carolina
- Coordinates: 36°6′39″N 79°17′43″W
- Area: 4.4 acres (1.8 ha)
- Built: 1911-1913
- Architect: Barrett & Thomson
- Architectural style: Queen Anne, Vernacular Queen Anne
- NRHP reference No.: 91001745
- Added to NRHP: November 29, 1991

The Woodlawn School is a historic school building located near Mebane, Alamance County, North Carolina. It is based on a design by architects Barrett & Thomson and built in two stages in 1911-12 and 1913. It is a Queen Anne style frame building with a gable roof and belfry. The listing included one contributing building and two contributing structures (a ballfield and a wood shed) on 4.4 acres (1.8 ha). It was originally used as a school and community center and, after 1935, exclusively as a community center. A stage was added to one of the classrooms and the ballfield constructed in 1939, with Works Progress Administration funds.

It was added to the National Register of Historic Places in 1991.

== Notable faculty ==
- Mary White Scott, schoolteacher and First Lady of North Carolina

== See also ==
- Woodlawn School (Mooresville, North Carolina), a similarly named private school founded in 2002
