= White and Company's Goose Lake Stoneware Manufactury =

Archaeological site in Illinois, United States

- U.S. National Register of Historic Places
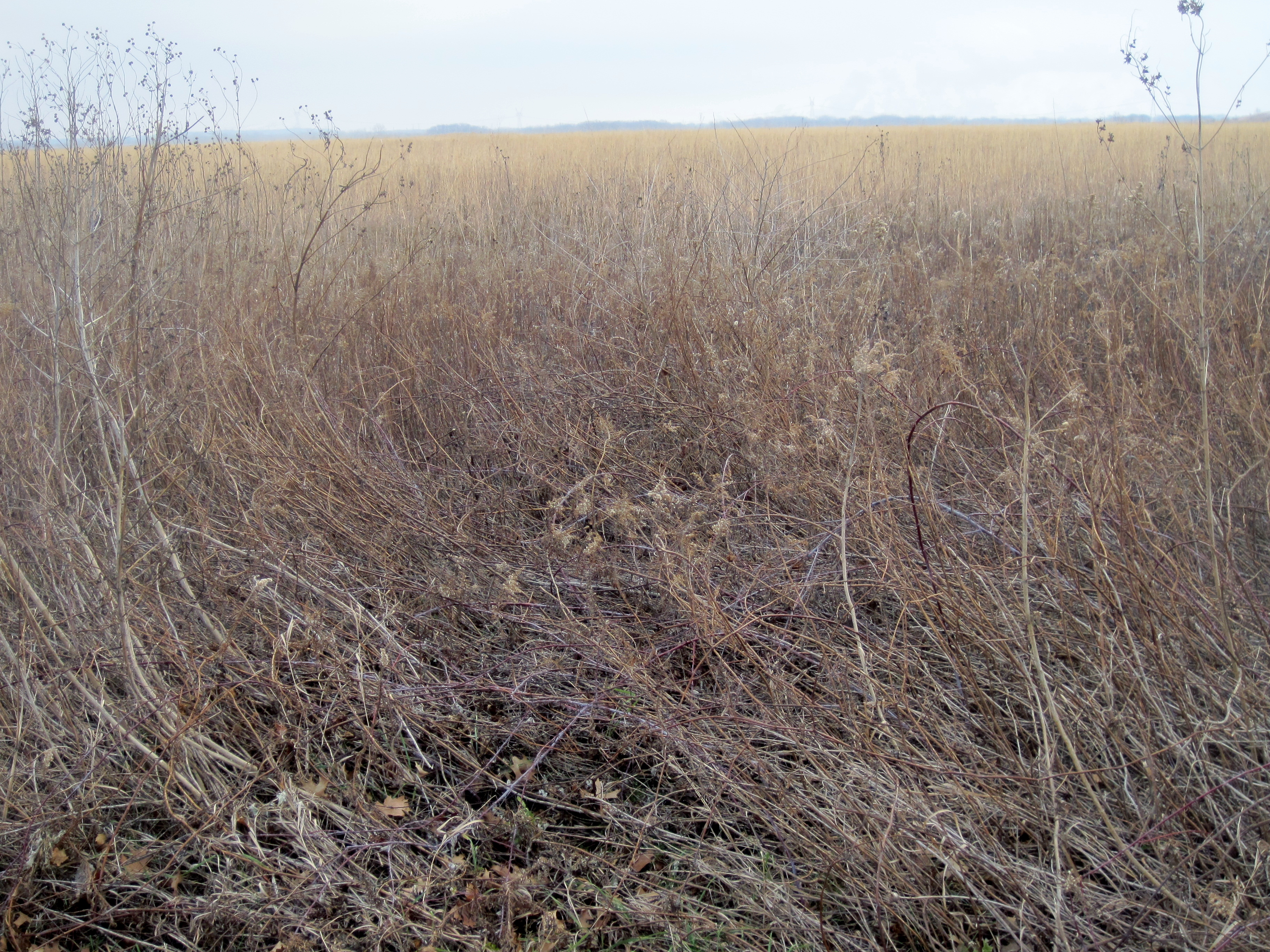
- The site of the manufactury in 2010

- Location within Illinois Location within the United States
- Location: 5010 N. Jugtown Rd., Morris, Illinois
- Coordinates: 41°20′50″N 88°19′19″W
- Area: 8.9 acres (3.6 ha)
- Built: 1855
- NRHP reference No.: 98000982
- Added to NRHP: August 6, 1998

White and Company's Goose Lake Stoneware Manufactury is an archaeological site located at 5010 N. Jugtown Road in the Goose Lake Prairie State Natural Area, near Morris, Illinois. The site, as well as the nearby tile works site, was part of a large White and Company plant used to manufacture stoneware and tile. The manufactury, which operated from 1855 to 1866, was one of the earliest large-scale stoneware plants in Illinois. The company chose the site for its plant due to the abundant clay resources around Goose Lake, which it used in its products. A town known as Jugtown was settled nearby for the plant's employees; the town reached a population of 114 by 1860. The stoneware site now mainly contains waste products from the stoneware production process, including kiln furniture and waster sherds.

The site was added to the National Register of Historic Places on August 6, 1998.
