= White Furniture Company =

Former company and current historic site in North Carolina, US

- U.S. National Register of Historic Places
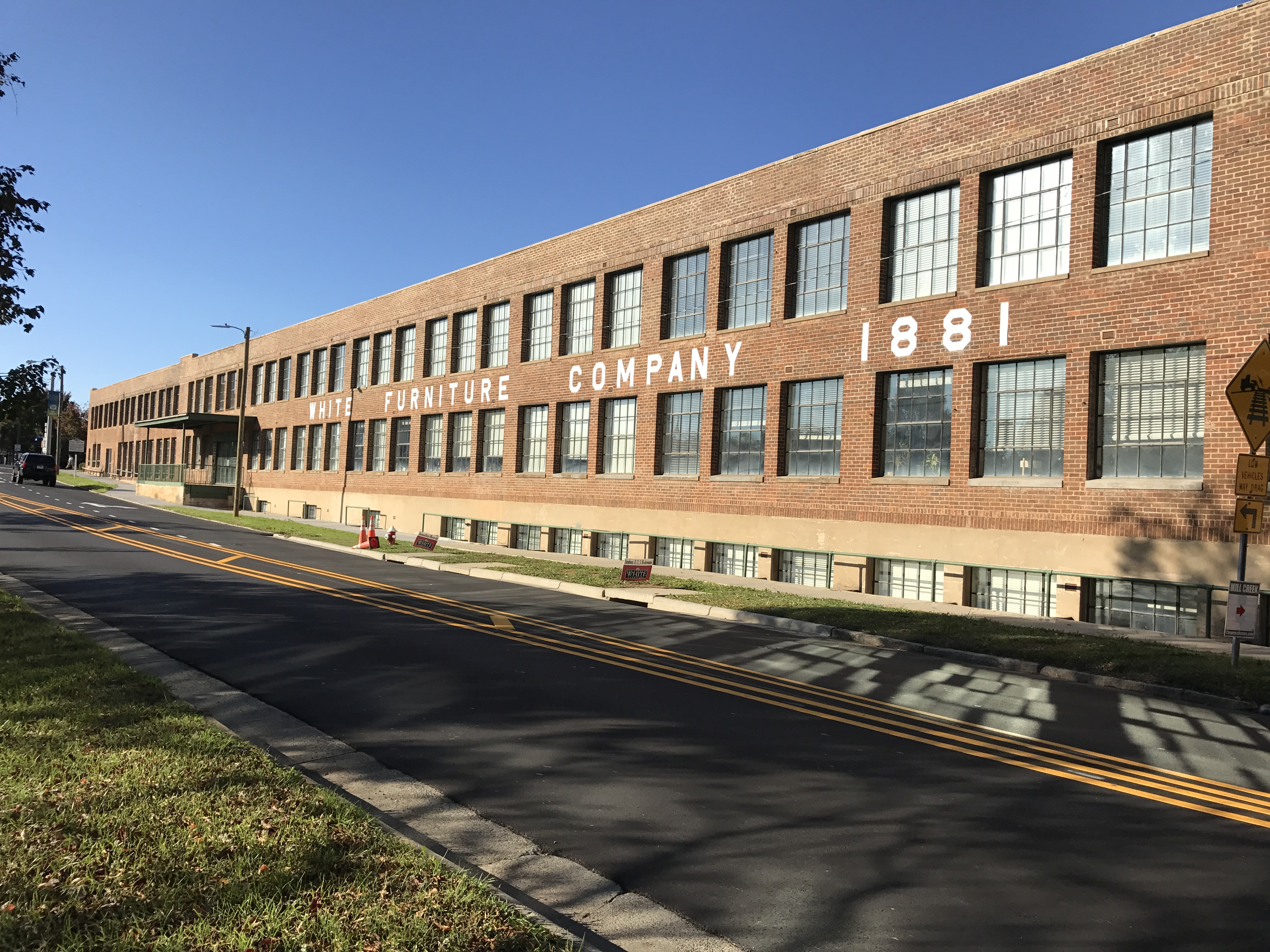
- White Furniture Company building in Mebane

- Location within North Carolina Location within the United States
- Location: E. Center and N. 5th Sts., Mebane, North Carolina
- Coordinates: 36°5′45″N 79°16′0″W
- Built: 1905
- NRHP reference No.: 82003422
- Added to NRHP: July 29, 1982

White Furniture Company, was a major American producer of hand-crafted fine furniture for over a century (1881–1993). Founded by the White Brothers of Mebane, North Carolina, the factory notably produced furnishings for the US government and the Grove Park Inn.

== Origins ==
In 1881, brothers Dave and Will White founded White Furniture Company. They used a small loan and $275 from working as telegraph operators as capital. Their father, Stephen A. White III, had acquired an amount of debt which soiled the family's name. Dave and Will pledged to repay their father's creditors, and such was the catalyst behind starting the factory.

Will White served as president of the company and Dave White as general manager. "The White Brothers were aggressive businessmen who took seriously their place in the town, and who, like many in the New South, equated industrial growth with civic duty and regional pride."

Working with only a plane and a boiler, the initial manufacturing was limited to only round oak dining tables and wagon wheels. While reaching an early success in 1886, a local businessman invested funds to expand White Furniture and purchase more advanced machinery. Within a brief time, the company employed 32 people and manufactured tables, chairs, and a bedroom set. The solid-oak bedroom set sold for nine dollars and included a bed, dresser, and washstand.

== Early history ==
=== The Panama Canal contracts ===
In 1906, under the command of Chief Engineer John Frank Stevens, hundreds of new buildings were built in Panama. These buildings were created to house army engineers and canal workers constructing the Panama Canal. The US government was in need of furniture for both enlisted men and American officers in Panama, and the bulk of the contracts was awarded to Whites. A local newspaper reported, "The first installment of furniture for the Panama Canal, contracted for the government with the White Furniture Company. This train of cars was handsomely placarded, each car bearing a 20-foot banner worded 'FROM THE WHITE FURNITURE CO., MEBANE, N.C., FOR U.S. GOVERNMENT, PANAMA CANAL,' and then the company trademark, 'The White Line Guarantees Satisfaction.'"

This was the first time a government contract of this type had been awarded to a 'southern factory'. A total of 58 boxcars were shipped from North Carolina to the Panama Canal.

Just one year after being awarded the Panama contracts, in 1907, White Furniture Company was awarded "Best manufacturer of American furniture" at the Jamestown Exhibition. (A World's Fair celebration during the 300th anniversary of the founding of the Jamestown Settlement.)
