= Mebane, North Carolina =

- City
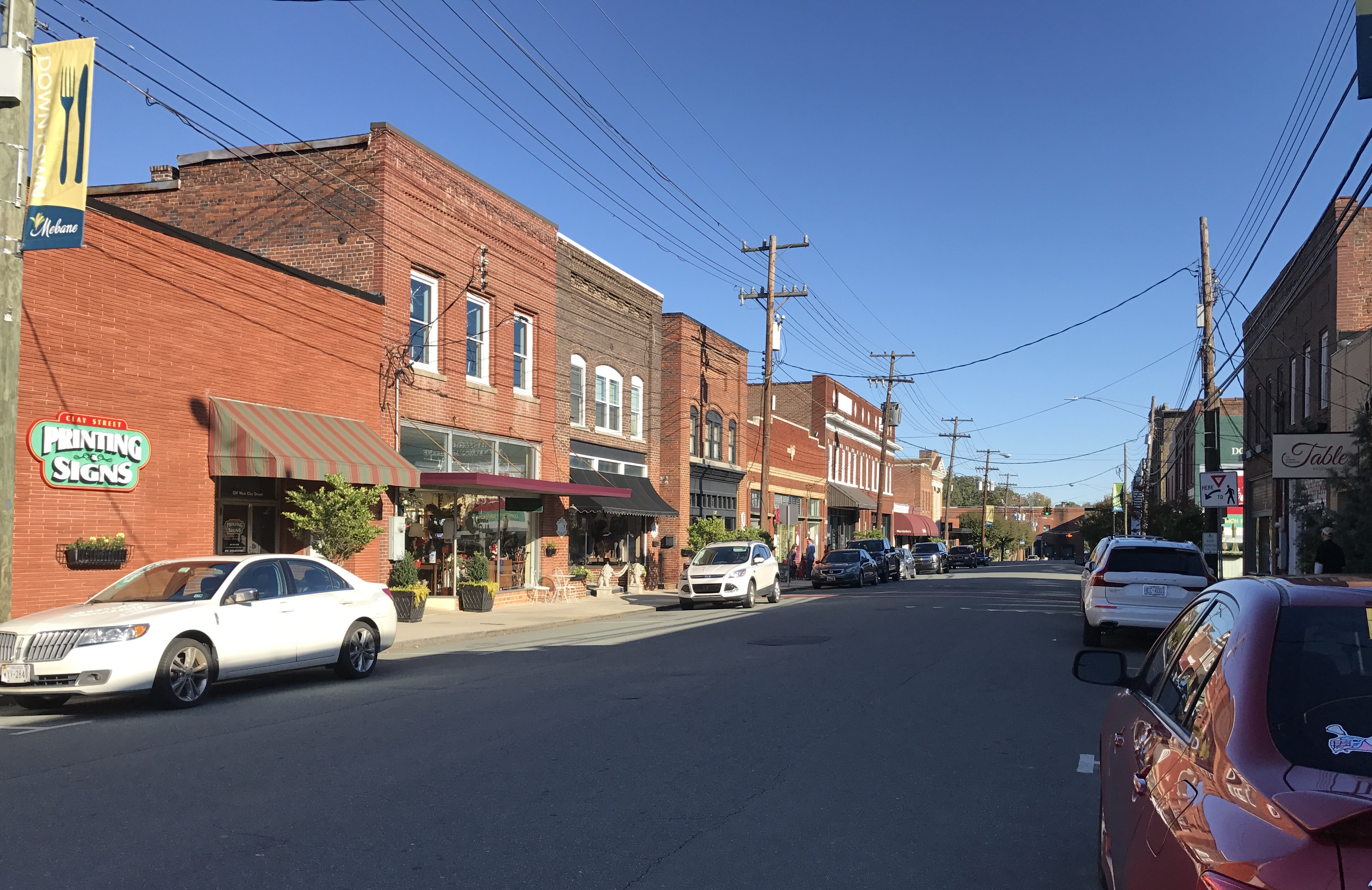
- West Clay Street

- Flag Seal
- Nickname: Biggest Little Town on Earth
- Motto: "Positively Charming"
- Location within the state of North Carolina Mebane (the United States)
- Coordinates: 36°05′05″N 79°16′27″W
- Country: United States
- State: North Carolina
- Counties: Alamance, Orange
- Named for: Brigadier General Alexander Mebane

Government
  - Type: City Manager/City Council
  - Mayor: James E. (Ed) Hooks

Area
  - Total: 11.17 sq mi (28.94 km^{2})
  - Land: 11.01 sq mi (28.51 km^{2})
  - Water: 0.17 sq mi (0.43 km^{2})
- Elevation: 682 ft (208 m)

Population (2020)
  - Total: 17,797
  - Density: 1,616.9/sq mi (624.27/km^{2})
- Time zone: UTC-5 (Eastern (EST))
  - Summer (DST): UTC-4 (EDT)
- ZIP code: 27302
- Area code: 919/984
- FIPS code: 37-42240
- GNIS feature ID: 2405061
- Website: cityofmebanenc.gov

Mebane (/ˈmɛbən/ MEB-ən) is a city located mostly in Alamance County, North Carolina, United States, and partly in Orange County. The town was named for Alexander Mebane, an American Revolutionary War general and member of the U.S. Congress. It was incorporated as "Mebanesville" in 1881, and in 1883 the name was changed to "Mebane". It was incorporated as a city in 1987. The population as of the 2020 census was 17,797.

Mebane is one of the fastest-growing municipalities in North Carolina. Mebane straddles the Research Triangle and Piedmont Triad Regions of North Carolina. The bulk of the city is in Alamance County, which comprises the Burlington, NC Metropolitan Statistical Area, itself a component of the Greensboro–Winston-Salem–High Point, NC Combined Statistical Area. Two slivers in the eastern portion of the city are in Orange County, which is part of the Durham-Chapel Hill, NC Metropolitan Statistical Area, itself a component of the Raleigh-Durham-Cary, NC Combined Statistical Area.

== History ==
The town was incorporated as Mebanesville in 1881. Its name was changed to Mebane two years later. It is named after Brigadier General Alexander Mebane, an officer during the American Revolution who later served as a U.S. Congressman.

The Charles F. and Howard Cates Farm, William Cook House, Cooper School, Cross Roads Presbyterian Church and Cemetery and Stainback Store, Durham Hosiery Mill No. 15, Griffis-Patton House, Thomas Guy House, Hawfields Presbyterian Church, Henderson Scott Farm Historic District, Mebane Commercial Historic District, Old South Mebane Historic District, Paisley-Rice Log House, White Furniture Company, and Woodlawn School are listed on the National Register of Historic Places.

In 1939 as part of the New Deal, Margaret C. Gates won a competition sponsored by the Section of Painting and Sculpture of the Treasury Department to create a post office mural in Mebane. Her painting, Landscape—Tobacco Curing, which showed a man and a young boy walking in tandem on their way to work on a tobacco farm, was completed and installed in 1941. In 1965, when the post office was remodeled, the mural was damaged beyond repair, as officials tried to remove it for restoration. A local artist, Henry E. Rood III, was hired to create an exact replica of the painting to adorn the new facility.

While the North Carolina Department of Transportation had long-standing plans to reroute North Carolina Highway 119, currently running through the city's downtown, to a new alignment further west, concerns in predominantly African-American communities along the proposed route, combined with longstanding dissatisfaction with access to municipal services, resulted in civil rights complaints being filed by the West End Revitalization Association and other local residents against the Department of Transportation and city government. Although a four-year moratorium on the project was established in 1999, the Federal Highway Administration eventually granted approval in December 2009.

In October 2014, the city council voted to adopt a new seal and slogan, replacing "A progressive community, the perfect place to call home" with "Positively Charming".

== Geography ==
According to the United States Census Bureau, the city has a total area of 8.5 square miles (21.9 km^{2}), of which 8.3 square miles (21.6 km^{2}) are land and 0.12 square miles (0.3 km^{2}), or 1.36%, is water.

== Demographics ==
Historical population
Census	Pop.	Note	%±
1900	218		—
1910	693		217.9%
1920	1,351		94.9%
1930	1,568		16.1%
1940	2,060		31.4%
1950	2,068		0.4%
1960	2,364		14.3%
1970	2,573		8.8%
1980	2,782		8.1%
1990	4,754		70.9%
2000	7,284		53.2%
2010	11,393		56.4%
2020	17,797		56.2%
2025 (est.)	21,952	▲	23.3%
U.S. Decennial Census

=== 2020 census ===
As of the 2020 census, Mebane had a population of 17,797. The median age was 36.5 years. 24.6% of residents were under the age of 18 and 13.6% of residents were 65 years of age or older. For every 100 females there were 83.3 males, and for every 100 females age 18 and over there were 78.6 males age 18 and over.

99.1% of residents lived in urban areas, while 0.9% lived in rural areas.

There were 7,308 households and 3,745 families residing in the city. Of the households, 34.4% had children under the age of 18 living in them. Of all households, 45.0% were married-couple households, 14.3% were households with a male householder and no spouse or partner present, and 34.3% were households with a female householder and no spouse or partner present. About 29.1% of all households were made up of individuals and 9.7% had someone living alone who was 65 years of age or older.

There were 7,736 housing units, of which 5.5% were vacant. The homeowner vacancy rate was 1.6% and the rental vacancy rate was 6.6%.

Mebane racial composition
Race	Number	Percentage
White (non-Hispanic)	10,351	58.16%
Black or African American (non-Hispanic)	4,303	24.18%
Native American	46	0.26%
Asian	592	3.33%
Pacific Islander	15	0.08%
Other/Mixed	959	5.39%
Hispanic or Latino	1,531	8.6%

=== 2010 census ===
As of the census of 2010, there were 11,393 people living in the city. The population density was 1,363 inhabitants per square mile (526/km^{2}). There were 5,045 housing units at an average density of 554.5 units per square mile (214.1 units/km^{2}). The racial makeup of the city was 73.5% White, 20.4% African American, 0.5% Native American, 1.2% Asian, 0.1% Pacific Islander, 0.2% from other races, and 2.6% from two or more races. Hispanic or Latino of any race were 6% of the population.

== Telephone service ==
Mebane straddles the Research Triangle and the Piedmont Triad areas of North Carolina. However, a majority of the phone numbers listed for the city are in the 919/984 area code, whereas the rest of Alamance County is situated in the 336/743 area code. When the Triad was split off into area code 910 in 1993, it was decided that Mebane would stay in 919 to keep the entire city within the same area code. This was retained even after the Triad split from 910 as its own area code, 336, in 1998. Since then, 984 has been introduced as an overlay with 919, followed by 743 as an overlay for 336. Mebane was originally in the 704 area code (at the time the only NC area code) until the 919 area code was introduced in 1954.

== Media ==
Reflecting that the city is split between two television markets, Spectrum's Mebane system offers stations from both the Triad and Triangle. DirecTV, Dish Network and U-verse customers receive the Triad local feed, since most of the city is in Alamance County. Mebane has a weekly community newspaper, the Mebane Enterprise, which covers the Mebane city government, local arts and culture, high school sports and local breaking news.

== Airport ==
Mebane was home to Hurdle Field, airport code 4W7.

Hurdle Field is no longer operational and is now a residential development.

== Education ==
The Alamance County portion is served by the Alamance-Burlington School System (which was created by a merger between the Alamance County School System and the Burlington City School System in 1996). The public schools serving Mebane residents within Alamance County include Eastern Alamance High School, Hawfields Middle School, Woodlawn Middle School, Audrey W. Garrett Elementary School, South Mebane Elementary School, and E. M. Yoder Elementary School; all part of the Alamance - Burlington School System (ABSS).

The Orange County portion is served by the Orange County Schools school district. Mebane residents in the Orange County portion are zoned to Efland Cheeks Elementary School, Gravely Hill Middle School, Orange Middle School, Orange High School, and Cedar Ridge High School.

There is one private school in Mebane, Bradford Academy, a classical Christian school started in 2008.

Mebane is within 20 miles (32 km) of several notable universities, including Duke University, UNC Chapel Hill, North Carolina Central University and Elon University. North Carolina State University & Saint Augustine's University are just over 40 miles (64 km) away in Raleigh.

Alamance Community College is a two-year college in Graham, 6 miles (10 km) west of Mebane.

== Commerce ==
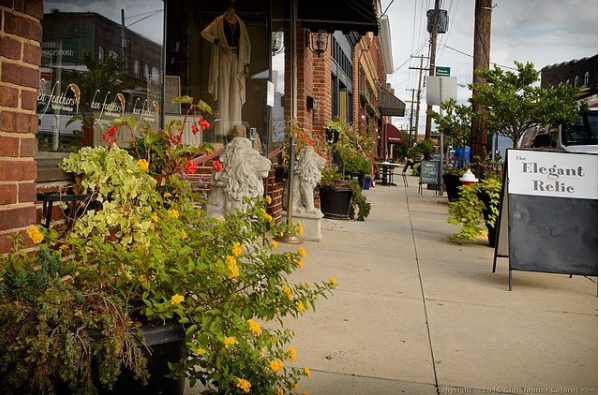
Downtown Mebane

Downtown Mebane was named a Top Five Great Place in North Carolina for 2017. Downtown Mebane is home to many high-end home furnishing stores, antique shops, and trendy clothing stores. The downtown also houses a wide variety of restaurants. The downtown area also boasts several antique and curio shops, also with a local flair. Coffee shops are populated by many residents and attract many young professionals and students.

Garrett Crossing, a shopping center located on the south side of Mebane next to Interstate 85 and Interstate 40, include a big box retail anchor as well as dining and other smaller shops. A Tanger Outlet mall is located on Arrowhead Boulevard on the north side of I-85 in Mebane.

== Notable people ==
- Lucy Hughes Brown, first African American woman licensed physician in North and South Carolina
- A. Oveta Fuller, prominent virologist who grew up near Yanceyville, North Carolina
- Zack Littell, MLB pitcher
- Ricardo Marsh, professional basketball player, 2007 top scorer in the Israel Basketball Premier League
- Junior Robinson, professional basketball player
- Zoë Roth, internet meme known as Disaster Girl
