= 2015–16 Northeast Conference men's basketball season =

- League: NCAA Division I
- Sport: Basketball
- Teams: 10
- TV partner(s): NEC Front Row, ESPN2, MSG, FCS, Regional Sports Networks

Regular Season
- First place: Wagner
- Runners-up: Fairleigh Dickinson, Sacred Heart, St. Francis Brooklyn
- Season MVP: Cane Broome, SHU
- Top scorer: Cane Broome, SHU

NEC Tournament
- Champions: Fairleigh Dickinson
- Runners-up: Wagner
- Finals MVP: Earl Potts Jr., FDU

Northeast Conference men's basketball seasons
- ← 2014–15 2016–17 →

2015–16 Northeast Conference men's basketball standings
	Conf.				Overall
Team	W		L	PCT	W		L	PCT
Wagner	13	–	5	.722	23	–	11	.676
Fairleigh Dickinson †	11	–	7	.611	18	–	15	.545
Sacred Heart	11	–	7	.611	12	–	18	.400
St. Francis Brooklyn	11	–	7	.611	15	–	17	.469
Mount St. Mary's	10	–	8	.556	14	–	19	.424
LIU Brooklyn	9	–	9	.500	16	–	15	.516
Saint Francis	9	–	9	.500	13	–	17	.433
Robert Morris	8	–	10	.444	10	–	22	.313
Bryant	5	–	13	.278	8	–	23	.258
Central Connecticut	3	–	15	.167	4	–	25	.138
† 2016 NEC tournament winner

The 2015–16 NEC men's basketball season began with practices in October 2015, followed by the start of the 2015–16 NCAA Division I men's basketball season in November. Conference play started in early January 2016 and will conclude in March with the 2016 Northeast Conference men's basketball tournament.

== Preseason ==
=== Rankings ===
	NEC Coaches Poll
1.	Mount St. Mary's (6)
2.	Robert Morris (3)
3.	Bryant (1)
4.	LIU Brooklyn
5.	St. Francis Brooklyn
6.	Wagner
7.	Sacred Heart
8.	Saint Francis (PA)
9.	Fairleigh Dickinson
10.	Central Connecticut

() first place votes

=== All-NEC team ===
Coaches Poll

BK Ashe Mount St. Mary's, Jr., G.
Cane Broome Sacred Heart, So., G.
Dan Garvin Bryant, Jr., F.
Rodney Pryor Robert Morris, Sr., G.
Gregory Graves Mount St. Mary's, Sr., F.

== Head coaches ==
Team	Head coach	Previous school	Seasons at school	Overall record	NEC record	NEC tournament championships	Postseason tournament championships
Bryant	Tim O'Shea	Ohio	8	73–139	43–63	0	0
Central Connecticut	Howie Dickenman	Connecticut (asst.)	20	278–286	184–142	3	0
Fairleigh Dickinson	Greg Herenda	UMass Lowell	3	18–42	9–25	0	0
LIU Brooklyn	Jack Perri	Long Island (assoc. HC)	4	41–52	24–28	1	0
Mount St. Mary's	Jamion Christian	VCU (asst.)	4	49–46	31–21	1	0
Robert Morris	Andrew Toole	Robert Morris (asst.)	6	110–66	66–23	1	0
Sacred Heart	Anthony Latina	Sacred Heart (asst.)	3	20–43	11–23	0	0
St. Francis Brooklyn	Glenn Braica	St. John's (asst.)	6	83–74	54–34	0	0
Saint Francis (PA)	Rob Krimmel	Saint Francis (PA) (asst.)	4	31–61	21–31	0	0
Wagner	Bashir Mason	Marist (asst.)	4	48–45	32–21	0	0

Notes:

- All records, appearances, titles, etc. are from time with current school only.
- Year at school includes 2015–16 season.
- Overall and NEC/NCAA records are from time at current school and are before the beginning of the 2015–16 season.
- Previous jobs are head coaching jobs unless otherwise noted.

== NEC regular season ==
=== Conference matrix ===
This table summarizes the head-to-head results between teams in conference play. (x) indicates games remaining this season.

	Bryant	Central Conn.	Fairleigh Dickinson	LIU Br'klyn	Mount St. Mary's	Robert Morris	Sacred Heart	St. Francis Br'klyn	Saint Francis (PA)	Wagner
vs. Bryant	–	1–1	1–1	1–1	1–1	2–0	2–0	1–1	2–0	2–0
vs. Central Conn.	1–1	–	2–0	2–0	1–1	1–1	2–0	2–0	2–0	2–0
vs. Fairleigh Dickinson	1–1	0–2	–	0–2	1–1	2–0	1–1	1–1	0–2	1–1
vs. LIU Br'klyn	1–1	0–2	2–0	–	1–1	2–0	1–1	1–1	1–1	0–2
vs. Mount St. Mary's	1–1	1–1	1–1	1–1	–	0–2	1–1	1–1	0–2	2–0
vs. Robert Morris	0–2	1–1	0–2	0–2	2–0	–	1–1	2–0	2–0	2–0
vs. Sacred Heart	0–2	0–2	1–1	1–1	1–1	1–1	–	1–1	1–1	1–1
vs. St. Francis Br'klyn	1–1	0–2	1–1	1–1	1–1	0–2	1–1	–	0–2	2–0
vs. Saint Francis (PA)	0–2	0–2	2–0	1–1	2–0	0–2	1–1	2–0	–	1–1
vs. Wagner	0–2	0–2	1–1	2–0	0–2	0–2	1–1	0–2	1–1	–
Total	5–13	3–15	11–7	9–9	10–8	8–10	11–7	11–7	9–9	13–5

=== Player of the week ===
Throughout the regular season, the Northeast Conference offices named a player of the week and a freshman of the week each Monday.

Week (Date)	Player of the week	Freshman of the week
1 (Nov. 16, 2015)	Cane Broome, SHU	Quincy McKnight, SHU
2 (Nov. 23, 2015)	Jerome Frink, LIU	Quincy McKnight, SHU (2nd)
3 (Nov. 30, 2015)	Earl Potts Jr., FDU	Marcel Pettway, BRY
4 (Dec. 7, 2015)	BK Ashe, MSM	Quincy McKnight, SHU (3rd)
5 (Dec. 14, 2015)	Jerome Frink, LIU (2nd)	Marcel Pettway, BRY (2nd)
6 (Dec. 21, 2015)	Rodney Prior, RMU	Evan Phoenix, CCSU
7 (Dec. 28, 2015)	Martin Hermannsson, LIU	Marcel Pettway, BRY (3rd)
8 (Jan. 5, 2016)	Cane Broome, SHU (2nd)	Marcel Pettway, BRY (4th)
9 (Jan. 11, 2016)	Earl Potts Jr., FDU (2nd)	Mike Holloway, FDU
10 (Jan. 18, 2016)	Earl Potts Jr., FDU (3rd)	Mike Holloway, FDU (2nd)
11 (Jan. 25, 2016)	Isaiah Blackmon, SFU	Isaiah Blackmon, SFU
12 (Feb. 1, 2016)	Michael Carey, WC; Martin Hermannsson, LIU (2nd)	Isaiah Blackmon, SFU (2nd)
13 (Feb. 8, 2016)	Ronnie Drinnon, SFU	Isaiah Still, RMU
14 (Feb. 15, 2016)	Junior Robinson, MSM; Martin Hermannsson, LIU (3rd)	Mike Holloway, FDU (3rd); Quincy McKnight, SHU (4th)
15 (Feb. 22, 2016)	Cane Broom, SHU (3rd)	Quincy McKnight, SHU (5th)
16 (Feb. 29, 2016)	Michael Carey, WC (2nd)	Nisre Zouzoua, BRY

== Postseason ==
=== NEC tournament ===
- March 2–8, 2016 Northeast Conference Basketball Tournament.

Quarterfinals; Wednesday, March 2 NEC Front Row
1	Wagner	59
8	Robert Morris	50
4	St. Francis Brooklyn	51
5	Mount St. Mary's	60
(Pairings are reseeded after the first round)
2	Fairleigh Dickinson	74
7	Saint Francis (PA)	72
3	Sacred Heart	76
6	LIU Brooklyn	84

Semifinals; Saturday, March 5 NEC Front Row, MSG+, and FCS
1	Wagner	81
6	LIU Brooklyn	65
2	Fairleigh Dickinson	80
5	Mount St. Mary's	75

Championship; Tuesday, March 8 ESPN2
1	Wagner	79
2	Fairleigh Dickinson	87

All games will be played at the venue of the higher seed

=== NCAA tournament ===
Seed	Region	School	First Four	2nd Round	3rd Round	Sweet 16	Elite Eight	Final Four	Championship
16	East	Fairleigh Dickinson	L, 65–96 vs. #16 Florida Gulf Coast – (Dayton)						

=== National Invitational tournament ===
Seed	Bracket	School	1st Round	2nd Round	Quarterfinals	Semifinals	Championship
8	St. Bonaventure/BYU Quadrant	Wagner	W, 79–75 vs. #1 St. Bonaventure	L, 54–87 vs. #4 Creighton			

== Honors and awards ==
2016 NEC Men's Basketball Individual Awards
Award	Recipient(s)
Player of the Year	Cane Broome, SHU
Coach of the Year	Bashir Mason, WC
Defensive Player of the Year	Amdy Fall, SFBK
Rookie of the Year	Marcel Pettway, BRY
Most Improved Player of the Year	Earl Potts Jr., FDU

2016 NEC Men's Basketball All-Conference Teams
First Team	Second Team	Third Team	Rookie Team
Cane Broome, So., G., SHU; Ronnie Drinnon, Sr., F., SFU; Jerome Frink, Jr., F., LIU; Martin Hermannsson, So., G., LIU; Rodney Prior, Sr., G., RMU	Darian Anderson, So., G., FDU; Michael Carey, Jr., G., WC; Corey Henson, So., G., WC; Earl Potts Jr., So., F., FDU; Junior Robinson, So., G., MSM	BK Ashe, Jr., G., MSM; Chris Hooper, Sr., F., SFBK; Yunus Hopkinson, Jr., G., SFBK; Tyreek Jewell, Sr., G., SFBK; Brandon Peel, Sr., F., CCSU	Mike Holloway, Fr., F., FDU; Quincy McKnight, Fr., G., SHU; Austin Nehls, Fr., G., CCSU; Marcel Pettway, Fr., F., BRY; Nisre Zouzoua, Fr., G., BRY
† - denotes unanimous selection

== Milestones and records ==
- On December 10, 2015 the St. Francis Brooklyn Terriers attempted 49 three-pointers against NJIT, the most in conference history in a single game.

== See also ==
2015–16 Northeast Conference women's basketball season
