= 2016 Northeast Conference men's basketball tournament =

- Classification: Division I
- Season: 2015–16
- Teams: 8
- Site: campus sites
- Finals site: Spiro Sports Center; Staten Island, NY
- Champions: Fairleigh Dickinson (5th title)
- Winning coach: Greg Herenda (1st title)
- MVP: Earl Potts Jr. (FDU)
- Attendance: 9,258

2015–16 Northeast Conference men's basketball standings
	Conf.				Overall
Team	W		L	PCT	W		L	PCT
Wagner	13	–	5	.722	23	–	11	.676
Fairleigh Dickinson †	11	–	7	.611	18	–	15	.545
Sacred Heart	11	–	7	.611	12	–	18	.400
St. Francis Brooklyn	11	–	7	.611	15	–	17	.469
Mount St. Mary's	10	–	8	.556	14	–	19	.424
LIU Brooklyn	9	–	9	.500	16	–	15	.516
Saint Francis	9	–	9	.500	13	–	17	.433
Robert Morris	8	–	10	.444	10	–	22	.313
Bryant	5	–	13	.278	8	–	23	.258
Central Connecticut	3	–	15	.167	4	–	25	.138
† 2016 NEC tournament winner

The 2016 Northeast Conference men's basketball tournament was held from March 2–8, 2016. The tournament featured the league's top eight seeds, with higher seed hosting all games. The winners of the tournament, Fairleigh Dickinson, will receive the conference's automatic bid to the 2016 NCAA Tournament. This is Fairleigh Dickinson's fifth Championship.

== Format ==
For the twelfth straight year, the NEC Men's Basketball Tournament consisted of an eight-team playoff format with all games played at the home of the higher seed. After the quarterfinals, the teams were reseeded so the highest remaining seed plays the lowest remaining seed in the semifinals.

== Seeds ==
Teams were seeded based on the final regular season standings, with ties broken under an NEC policy.

Seed	School	Conference	Tiebreaker
1	Wagner‡	13–5	
2	Fairleigh Dickinson	11–7	1–1 vs. SHU, 1–1 vs. SFC, 1–1 vs. Wagner, 2–0 vs. LIU, 2–0 vs. SFU
3	Sacred Heart	11–7	1–1 vs. SFC, 1–1 vs. FDU, 1–1 vs. Wagner, 1–1 vs. LIU, 1–1 vs. SFU
4	St. Francis Brooklyn	11–7	1–1 vs. FDU, 1–1 vs. SHU, 0–2 vs. Wagner
5	Mount St. Mary's	10–8	
6	LIU Brooklyn	9–9	1–1 vs. SFU, 2–0 vs. Wagner
7	Saint Francis (PA)	9–9	1–1 vs. LIU, 1–1 vs. Wagner
8	Robert Morris	8–10	

== Bracket ==
Teams were reseed after each round with highest remaining seeds receiving home court advantage.

Quarterfinals; Wednesday, March 2 NEC Front Row
1	Wagner	59
8	Robert Morris	50
4	St. Francis Brooklyn	51
5	Mount St. Mary's	60
(Pairings are reseeded after the first round)
2	Fairleigh Dickinson	74
7	Saint Francis (PA)	72
3	Sacred Heart	76
6	LIU Brooklyn	84

Semifinals; Saturday, March 5 NEC Front Row, MSG+, and FCS
1	Wagner	81
6	LIU Brooklyn	65
2	Fairleigh Dickinson	80
5	Mount St. Mary's	75

Championship; Tuesday, March 8 ESPN2
1	Wagner	79
2	Fairleigh Dickinson	87

All games will be played at the venue of the higher seed

== Game summaries ==
=== Quarterfinals: #1 Wagner vs. #8 Robert Morris ===
Series History: Robert Morris leads 41–28

NEC Front Row

March 2
7:00 PM

Recap

#1 Wagner 59, #8 Robert Morris 50
Scoring by half: 24–19, 35–31
Pts: Mike Aaman 12; Rebs: Michael Carey 14; Asts: Michael Carey 3	Pts: Isaiah Still 11; Rebs: Rodney Pryor 7 Asts: Kavon Stewart 6

Spiro Sports Center
Staten Island, NY
Attendance: 1,012
Referees: Robert Testa, Art Jackson, Mike Pearson

=== Quarterfinals: #2 Fairleigh Dickinson vs. #7 Saint Francis (PA) ===
Series History: Fairleigh Dickinson leads 44–40

NEC Front Row

March 2
7:00 PM

Recap

#2 Fairleigh Dickinson 74, #7 Saint Francis (PA) 72
Scoring by half: 40–44, 34–28
Pts: Darian Anderson 22; Rebs: Earl Potts Jr. 6 Asts: Stephen Jiggets 7	Pts: Ronnie Drinnon 21; Rebs: Ronnie Drinnon 22; Asts: Greg Brown 5

Rothman Center
Hackensack, NJ
Attendance: 1,127
Referees: John Hughes, Rod Mrakovich, Dave Fernandez

=== Quarterfinals: #3 Sacred Heart vs. #6 LIU Brooklyn ===
Series History: LIU Brooklyn leads 20–11

MSG, FCS, NEC Front Row

March 2
7:00 PM

Recap

#6 LIU Brooklyn 84, #3 Sacred Heart 76
Scoring by half: 47–33, 37–43
Pts: Joel Hernandez 22; Rebs: Joel Hernandez 7 Asts: Martin Hermannsson 6	Pts: Cane Broome 35; Rebs: Cane Broome 8 Asts: Jordan Allen 3

William H. Pitt Center
Fairfield, CT
Attendance: 710
Referees: Guy Pagano, Douglas Grant, Tom Regan

=== Quarterfinals: #4 St. Francis Brooklyn vs. #5 Mount St. Mary's ===
Series History: Mount St. Mary's leads 30–26

MSG, FCS, NEC Front Row

March 2
9:00 PM

Recap

#5 Mount St. Mary's 60, #4 St. Francis Brooklyn 51
Scoring by half: 24–34, 36–17
Pts: Yunus Hopkinson 18; Rebs: Amdy Fall 9 Asts: Chris Hooper 5	Pts: BK Ashe 18; Rebs: BK Ashe 7 Asts: BK Ashe 4

Generoso Pope Athletic Complex
Brooklyn, NY
Attendance: 675
Referees: Steve Ruppenthal, Gary Prager, Brandon Williams

=== Semifinal: #1 Wagner vs. #6 LIU Brooklyn ===
Series History: Wagner leads 40–39

MSG+, FCS, NEC Front Row

March 5
4:00 PM

Recap

#1 Wagner 81, #6 LIU Brooklyn 65
Scoring by half: 29–33, 52–32
Pts: Michael Carey 28; Rebs: Michael Carey 10; Asts: Corey Henson 4	Pts: Joel Hernandez 19; Rebs: Jerome Frink 8 Asts: Martin Hermannsson 4

Spiro Sports Center
Staten Island, NY
Attendance: 1,814
Referees: Jim Bruno, Brandon Cruz, Tom Courtney

=== Semifinal: #2 Fairleigh Dickinson vs. #5 Mount St. Mary's ===
Series History: Fairleigh Dickinson leads 27–23

MSG+, FCS, NEC Front Row

March 5
2:00 PM

Recap

#2 Fairleigh Dickinson 80, #5 Mount St. Mary's 75
Scoring by half: 39–39, 41–36
Pts: Earl Potts Jr. 20; Rebs: Mike Holloway 17; Asts: Darian Anderson 4	Pts: Junior Robinson 21; Rebs: BK Ashe 7 Asts: Junior Robinson 2

Rothman Center
Hackensack, NJ
Attendance: 1,562
Referees: Lionel Butler, Andrew Maira, James Ostwalt

=== Championship: #1 Wagner 79 vs. #2 Fairleigh Dickinson 87 ===
Series History: Fairleigh Dickinson leads 41–37

ESPN2

March 8
7:00 PM

Recap

#2 Fairleigh Dickinson 87, #1 Wagner 79
Scoring by half: 33–35, 54–44
Pts: Darian Anderson 28; Rebs: Earl Potts, Jr. 7 Asts: Dairan Anderson 5	Pts: Corey Hensen 24; Rebs: Michael Carey 11; Asts: Michael Carey 5

Spiro Sports Center
Staten Island, NY
Attendance: 2,358
Referees: Earl Walton, Robert Riley, Donnie Eppley

*All times EST

== All-tournament team ==
Tournament MVP in bold.

Name	School	Pos.	Year	Ht.	Hometown
**Earl Potts Jr.**	Fairleigh Dickinson	Guard	Sophomore	6-6	Severn, Maryland
Darian Anderson	Fairleigh Dickinson	Guard	Sophomore	6-1	Washington, D.C.
Michael Carey	Wagner	Guard/Forward	Junior	6-5	Nassau, Bahamas
Corey Henson	Wagner	Guard	Sophomore	6-3	Upper Marlboro, Maryland
Joel Hernandez	LIU Brooklyn	Guard	Junior	6-3	Teaneck, New Jersey
