= 2015–16 Fairleigh Dickinson Knights men's basketball team =

American college basketball season

2015–16 Fairleigh Dickinson Knights men's basketball
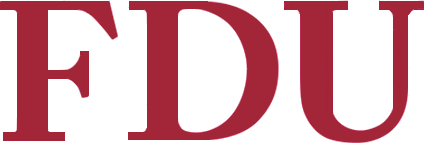

Northeast tournament champions

NCAA tournament, First Four
- Conference: Northeast Conference
- Record: 18–15 (11–7 NEC)
- Head coach: Greg Herenda (3rd season)
- Associate head coach: Bruce Hamburger
- Assistant coaches: Dwayne Lee; Winston Smith
- Home arena: Rothman Center

2015–16 Northeast Conference men's basketball standings
	Conf.				Overall
Team	W		L	PCT	W		L	PCT
Wagner	13	–	5	.722	23	–	11	.676
Fairleigh Dickinson †	11	–	7	.611	18	–	15	.545
Sacred Heart	11	–	7	.611	12	–	18	.400
St. Francis Brooklyn	11	–	7	.611	15	–	17	.469
Mount St. Mary's	10	–	8	.556	14	–	19	.424
LIU Brooklyn	9	–	9	.500	16	–	15	.516
Saint Francis	9	–	9	.500	13	–	17	.433
Robert Morris	8	–	10	.444	10	–	22	.313
Bryant	5	–	13	.278	8	–	23	.258
Central Connecticut	3	–	15	.167	4	–	25	.138
† 2016 NEC tournament winner

The 2015–16 Fairleigh Dickinson Knights men's basketball team represented Fairleigh Dickinson University during the 2015–16 NCAA Division I men's basketball season. The team was led by third-year head coach Greg Herenda. The Knights played their home games at the Rothman Center and were members of the Northeast Conference. They finished the season 18–15, 11–7 in NEC play to finish in a three-way tie for second place. They defeated Saint Francis (PA), Mount St. Mary's, and Wagner to win the NEC tournament and receive the conference's automatic bid to the NCAA tournament. As a No. 16 seed, they lost to Florida Gulf Coast in the First Four.

== Roster ==
2015–16 Fairleigh Dickinson Knights men's basketball team
Players
Coaches

Pos.	#	Name	Height	Weight	Year	Hometown
G	1	Stephan Jiggetts	6 ft 1 in (1.85 m)	205 lb (93 kg)	So	Forestville, Maryland
G	2	Darian Anderson	6 ft 1 in (1.85 m)	205 lb (93 kg)	So	Washington, D.C.
G	3	DaRon Curry	6 ft 1 in (1.85 m)	170 lb (77 kg)	Fr	Deptford, New Jersey
G	5	Earl Potts Jr.	6 ft 6 in (1.98 m)	200 lb (91 kg)	So	Severn, Maryland
F	13	Tyrone O'Garro	6 ft 6 in (1.98 m)	170 lb (77 kg)	Jr	Newark, New Jersey
G	15	Marques Townes	6 ft 4 in (1.93 m)	210 lb (95 kg)	So	Edison, New Jersey
F	20	Dondre Rhoden	6 ft 6 in (1.98 m)	230 lb (104 kg)	Fr	Ridgefield Park, New Jersey
F	21	Myles Mann	6 ft 6 in (1.98 m)	250 lb (113 kg)	Jr	Atlanta, Georgia
G	22	Darnell Edge	6 ft 1 in (1.85 m)	175 lb (79 kg)	Fr	Saugerties, New York
G	23	Ghassan Nehme	6 ft 3 in (1.91 m)	175 lb (79 kg)	Fr	Colorado Springs, Colorado
G	24	Mike Schroback	5 ft 4 in (1.63 m)	210 lb (95 kg)	So	Hasbrouck Heights, New Jersey]
F	34	Mike Holloway	6 ft 7 in (2.01 m)	245 lb (111 kg)	Fr	Pittsgrove, New Jersey
C	35	Malik Miller	6 ft 9 in (2.06 m)	215 lb (98 kg)	Fr	Troy, New York

Head coach

- Greg Herenda (Merrimack)

Assistant coach(es)

- Bruce Hamburger
- Dwayne Lee

Legend

- (C) Team captain
- (S) Suspended
- (I) Ineligible
- (W) Walk-on
- Injured
- Current redshirt

Roster
Last update: October 13, 2015

== Schedule ==
Date time, TV	Rank^{#}	Opponent^{#}	Result	Record	Site (attendance) city, state
Non-conference regular season
November 13, 2015*; 7:00 pm, FS2		at No. 11 Villanova	L 54–91	0–1	The Pavilion (6,500); Villanova, PA
November 16, 2015*; 7:00 pm		FDU–Florham Campus	W 111–70	1–1	Rothman Center (478); Hackensack, NJ
November 18, 2015*; 7:00 pm		Army	L 85–96	1–2	Rothman Center (638); Hackensack, NJ
November 21, 2015*; 2:00 pm		at Fordham	L 62–85	1–3	Rose Hill Gymnasium (2,108); Bronx, NY
November 24, 2015*; 7:00 pm		at Delaware	L 72–73	1–4	Bob Carpenter Center (1,584); Newark, DE
November 28, 2015*; 2:00 pm		Saint Peter's	W 77–62	2–4	Rothman Center (692); Hackensack, NJ
November 30, 2015*; 7:00 pm		at Princeton	L 61–91	2–5	Jadwin Gymnasium (1,232); Princeton, NJ
December 2, 2015*; 7:00 pm, ESPN3		at Temple	L 70–79	2–6	Liacouras Center (4,034); Philadelphia, PA
December 9, 2015*; 7:00 pm		at Lafayette	W 91–89 ^{OT}	3–6	Kirby Sports Center (1,432); Easton, PA
December 18, 2015*; 8:00 pm		Towson	W 69–68	4–6	Rothman Center (547); Hackensack, NJ
December 23, 2015*; 7:00 pm, BTN+		at Rutgers	L 64–72	4–7	The RAC (3,624); Piscataway, NJ
Northeast Conference regular season
January 2, 2016; 4:30 pm		St. Francis Brooklyn	W 86–77	5–7 (1–0)	Rothman Center (638); Hackensack, NJ
January 4, 2016; 7:30 pm		Bryant	L 80–85	5–8 (1–1)	Rothman Center (468); Hackensack, NJ
January 7, 2016 pm		at Sacred Heart	W 80–68	6–8 (2–1)	William H. Pitt Center (354); Fairfield, CT
January 9, 2016 pm		Central Connecticut	W 92–73	7–8 (3–1)	Rothman Center (387); Hackensack, NJ
January 14, 2016; 7:00 pm		at Saint Francis (PA)	W 71–59	8–8 (4–1)	DeGol Arena (1,072); Loretto, PA
January 16, 2016; 4:00 pm		at Robert Morris	L 58–64	8–9 (4–2)	Charles L. Sewall Center (1,678); Moon Township, PA
January 21, 2016; 7:00 pm		LIU Brooklyn	W 101–95	9–9 (5–2)	Rothman Center (379); Hackensack, NJ
January 24, 2016; 2:00 pm		Mount St. Mary's; Postponed from 1/23/16	L 72–87	9–10 (5–3)	Rothman Center; Hackensack, NJ
January 28, 2016; 7:00 pm		Saint Francis (PA)	W 86–82 ^{OT}	10–10 (6–3)	Rothman Center (523); Hackensack, NJ
January 30, 2016; 4:30 pm		at LIU Brooklyn	W 88–85	11–10 (7–3)	Steinberg Wellness Center (1,375); Brooklyn, NY
February 4, 2016; 7:00 pm		at Wagner	W 82–79 ^{OT}	12–10 (8–3)	Spiro Sports Center (1,722); Staten Island, NY
February 6, 2016; 4:00 pm		at St. Francis Brooklyn	L 71–85	12–11 (8–4)	Generoso Pope Athletic Complex (355); Brooklyn, NY
February 11, 2016; 7:00 pm, MSG/FCS		at Bryant	W 91–77	13–11 (9–4)	Chace Athletic Center (689); Smithfield, RI
February 13, 2016; 4:30 pm, MSG/FCS/RTPT		Robert Morris	L 70–72	13–12 (9–5)	Rothman Center (1,411); Hackensack, NJ
February 18, 2016; 7:00 pm		Wagner	L 74–94	13–13 (9–6)	Rothman Center (1,116); Hackensack, NJ
February 20, 2016; 4:30 pm, ESPN3		Sacred Heart	L 86–91	13–14 (9–7)	Rothman Center (1,228); Hackensack, NJ
February 25, 2016; 7:00 pm		at Mount St. Mary's	W 67–54	14–14 (10–7)	Knott Arena (2,160); Emmitsburg, PA
February 27, 2016; 3:30 pm		at Central Connecticut	W 81–75	15–14 (11–7)	William H. Detrick Gymnasium (2,512); New Britain, CT
NEC tournament
March 2, 2016; 7:00 pm	(2)	(7) Saint Francis (PA); Quarterfinals	W 74–72	16–14	Rothman Center (1,127); Hackensack, NJ
March 5, 2016; 2:00 pm, MSG+, FCS	(2)	(5) Mount St. Mary's; Semifinals	W 80–74	17–14	Rothman Center (1,562); Hackensack, NJ
March 8, 2016; 7:00 pm, ESPN2	(2)	at (1) Wagner; Championship	W 87–79	18–14	Spiro Sports Center (2,358); Staten Island, NY
NCAA tournament
March 15, 2016*; 6:30 pm, truTV	(16 E)	vs. (16 E) Florida Gulf Coast; First Four	L 65–96	18–15	UD Arena (11,728); Dayton, OH
*Non-conference game. ^{#}Rankings from AP Poll. (#) Tournament seedings in parentheses. E=East Region. All times are in Eastern Time.
