= 2015–16 Saint Francis Red Flash men's basketball team =

American college basketball season

2015–16 Saint Francis Red Flash men's basketball
- Conference: Northeast Conference
- Record: 13–17 (9–9 NEC)
- Head coach: Rob Krimmel (4th season)
- Assistant coaches: Mike Summey; Eric Taylor; Will Holland
- Home arena: DeGol Arena

2015–16 Northeast Conference men's basketball standings
	Conf.				Overall
Team	W		L	PCT	W		L	PCT
Wagner	13	–	5	.722	23	–	11	.676
Fairleigh Dickinson †	11	–	7	.611	18	–	15	.545
Sacred Heart	11	–	7	.611	12	–	18	.400
St. Francis Brooklyn	11	–	7	.611	15	–	17	.469
Mount St. Mary's	10	–	8	.556	14	–	19	.424
LIU Brooklyn	9	–	9	.500	16	–	15	.516
Saint Francis	9	–	9	.500	13	–	17	.433
Robert Morris	8	–	10	.444	10	–	22	.313
Bryant	5	–	13	.278	8	–	23	.258
Central Connecticut	3	–	15	.167	4	–	25	.138
† 2016 NEC tournament winner

The 2015–16 Saint Francis Red Flash men's basketball team represented Saint Francis University during the 2015–16 NCAA Division I men's basketball season. The Red Flash, led by fourth year head coach Rob Krimmel, played their home games at the DeGol Arena and were members of the Northeast Conference. They finished the season 13–17, 9–9 in NEC play to finish in a tie for sixth place. They lost in the quarterfinals of the NEC tournament to Fairleigh Dickinson.

== Roster ==
Number	Name	Position	Height	Weight	Year	Hometown
0	Ifeanyi Umezurike	Forward/Center	6–10	240	Freshman	Uturu, Nigeria
1	Malik Harmon	Guard	5–11	194	Junior	Queens, New York
2	Scott Meredith	Guard	6–2	180	Freshman	Pilot Mountain, North Carolina
4	Jordan Forehand	Guard	6–0	180	Freshman	Bridgewater, New Jersey
5	Daniel Wallace	Forward	6–8	215	Sophomore	Suffolk, Virginia
11	Ben Millaud-Meunier	Guard	6–1	185	Senior	Montreal, Quebec, Canada
12	Greg Brown	Guard	6–2	183	Senior	Odenton, Maryland
14	Andre Wolford	Guard	6–2	175	Freshman	Willowick, Ohio
22	Michael Klebon	Guard	6–2	175	Freshman	Paxinos, Pennsylvania
23	Georgios Angelou	Guard	6–1	185	Junior	Halkida, Greece
24	Isaiah Blackmon	Guard	6–1	170	Freshman	Charlotte, North Carolina
32	Josh Nebo	Forward/Center	6–8	215	Freshman	Katy, Texas
33	Patrick Wrencher	Forward	6–6	250	Junior	West Chester, Ohio
35	Basil Thompson	Forward	6–6	187	Sophomore	Philadelphia, Pennsylvania
40	Ronnie Drinnon	Forward	6–7	225	Senior	Jamestown, Ohio

== Schedule ==
Date time, TV	Rank^{#}	Opponent^{#}	Result	Record	Site (attendance) city, state
Non-conference regular season
November 13, 2015*; 7:30 pm, ESPN3		at No. 19 Notre Dame	L 56–87	0–1	Edmund P. Joyce Center (9,149); South Bend, IN
November 17, 2015*; 7:00 pm		Westminster	W 103–72	1–1	DeGol Arena (1,017); Loretto, PA
November 21, 2015*; 7:00 pm		American	W 68–48	2–1	DeGol Arena (1,072); Loretto, PA
November 24, 2015*; 9:00 pm		at Kent State	L 60–79	2–2	MAC Center (3,262); Kent, OH
November 27, 2015*; 4:00 pm		at Maryland Eastern Shore	L 57–70	2–3	Hytche Athletic Center (428); Princess Anne, MD
December 2, 2015*; 7:00 pm		Lehigh	W 84–73	3–3	DeGol Arena (1,032); Loretto, PA
December 4, 2015*; 7 pm, Big Ten Network		at No. 2 Maryland	L 55–96	3–4	XFINITY Center (17,950); College Park, MD
December 12, 2015*; 1:00 pm		vs. Duquesne	L 65–67	3–5	Cambria County War Memorial Arena (1,015); Johnstown, PA
December 15, 2015*; 7:30 pm, AMERICAEAST.TV		at Binghamton	W 67–61	4–5	Binghamton University Events Center (1,870); Vestal, NY
December 19, 2015*; 7:00 pm, AMERICAEAST.TV		at Albany	L 58–65	4–6	SEFCU Arena (2,762); Albany, NY
December 30, 2015*; 7:00 pm		NJIT	L 65–77	4–7	DeGol Arena (632); Loretto, PA
NEC regular season
January 2, 2016; 4:00 pm		Wagner	W 73–65	5–7 (1–0)	DeGol Arena (662); Loretto, PA
January 4, 2016; 5:00 pm		Sacred Heart	W 84–80	6–7 (2–0)	DeGol Arena (539); Loretto, PA
January 7, 2016; 7:00 pm		at St. Francis Brooklyn	L 56–73	6–8 (2–1)	Generoso Pope Athletic Complex (275); Brooklyn, NY
January 9, 2016; 4:30 pm		at LIU Brooklyn	W 72–65	7–8 (3–1)	Steinberg Wellness Center (1,174); Brooklyn, NY
January 14, 2016; 7:00 pm		Fairleigh Dickinson	L 59–71	7–9 (3–2)	DeGol Arena (1,072); Loretto, PA
January 16, 2016; 4:00 pm, ESPN3/MASN/FCS		Mount St. Mary's	L 72–82	7–10 (3–3)	DeGol Arena (1,128); Loretto, PA
January 21, 2016; 7:00 pm		at Bryant	W 71–65	8–10 (4–3)	Chace Athletic Center (365); Smithfield, RI
January 23, 2016; 3:30 pm		at Central Connecticut	W 79–64	9–10 (5–3)	William H. Detrick Gymnasium (812); New Britain, CT
January 28, 2016; 7:00 pm		at Fairleigh Dickinson	L 82–86	9–11 (5–4)	Rothman Center (523); Teaneck, NJ
January 30, 2016; 7:00 pm		Robert Morris	W 90–78	10–11 (6–4)	DeGol Arena (1,723); Loretto, PA
February 4, 2016; 7:00 pm		Bryant	W 63–57	11–11 (7–4)	DeGol Arena (1,062); Loretto, PA
February 6, 2016; 4:00 pm		Central Connecticut	W 91–82	12–11 (8–4)	DeGol Arena (1,392); Loretto, PA
February 11, 2016; 5:00 pm, ESPNU		at Robert Morris	W 68–57	13–11 (9–4)	Charles L. Sewall Center (1,591); Moon Township, PA
February 13, 2016; 3:00 pm, ESPN3		at Mount St. Mary's	L 61–66	13–12 (9–5)	Knott Arena (3,121); Emmitsburg, MD
February 18, 2016; 7:00 pm		St. Francis Brooklyn	L 58–70	13–13 (9–6)	DeGol Arena (1,381); Loretto, PA
February 20, 2016; 1:00 pm		LIU Brooklyn	L 89–94 ^{OT}	13–14 (9–7)	DeGol Arena (1,531); Loretto, PA
February 25, 2016; 7:00 pm		at Wagner	L 54–69	13–15 (9–8)	Spiro Sports Center (1,817); Staten Island, NY
February 27, 2016; 3:30 pm		at Sacred Heart	L 78–88	13–16 (9–9)	William H. Pitt Center (711); Fairfield, CT
NEC tournament
March 2, 2016; 7:00 pm	(7)	at (2) Fairleigh Dickinson; Quarterfinals	L 72–74	13–17	Rothman Center (1,127); Teaneck, NJ
*Non-conference game. ^{#}Rankings from AP Poll. (#) Tournament seedings in parentheses. All times are in Eastern Time..
