= 2015–16 Central Connecticut Blue Devils men's basketball team =

American college basketball season

2015–16 Central Connecticut Blue Devils men's basketball
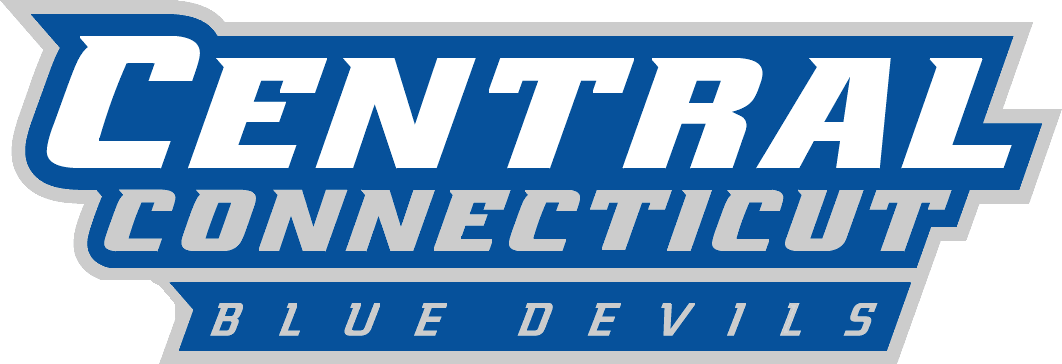
- Conference: Northeast Conference
- Record: 4–25 (3–15 NEC)
- Head coach: Howie Dickenman (20th season)
- Assistant coaches: Greg Collucci; Tobe Carberry; Obie Nwadike
- Home arena: William H. Detrick Gymnasium

2015–16 Northeast Conference men's basketball standings
	Conf.				Overall
Team	W		L	PCT	W		L	PCT
Wagner	13	–	5	.722	23	–	11	.676
Fairleigh Dickinson †	11	–	7	.611	18	–	15	.545
Sacred Heart	11	–	7	.611	12	–	18	.400
St. Francis Brooklyn	11	–	7	.611	15	–	17	.469
Mount St. Mary's	10	–	8	.556	14	–	19	.424
LIU Brooklyn	9	–	9	.500	16	–	15	.516
Saint Francis	9	–	9	.500	13	–	17	.433
Robert Morris	8	–	10	.444	10	–	22	.313
Bryant	5	–	13	.278	8	–	23	.258
Central Connecticut	3	–	15	.167	4	–	25	.138
† 2016 NEC tournament winner

The 2015–16 Central Connecticut Blue Devils men's basketball team represented Central Connecticut State University during the 2015–16 NCAA Division I men's basketball season. The Blue Devils, led by 20th year head coach Howie Dickenman, played their home games at the William H. Detrick Gymnasium and were members of the Northeast Conference. They finished the season 4–25, 3–15 in NEC play to finish in last place. They failed to qualify for the NEC tournament.

On February 18, head coach Howie Dickenman announced he would retire at the end of the season. He finished at Central Connecticut with a 20-year record of 281–311.

== Roster ==
Number	Name	Position	Height	Weight	Year	Hometown
1	Kevin Seymour	Guard	6–0	175	Sophomore	Bronx, New York
2	J. J. Cratit	Guard	6–3	213	Junior	Miami, Florida
3	Mustafa Jones	Forward	6–7	180	Sophomore	Harlem, New York
5	Eric Bowles	Guard	6–0	180	Freshman	Fairfax, Virginia
10	Austin Nehls	Guard	6–3	185	Freshman	East Greenbush, New York
11	Tidell Pierre	Guard	6–7	210	Junior	Long Island, New York
12	Khalen Kumberlander	Guard	6–3	185	RS–Junior	Washington, D.C.
13	Evan Phoenix	Forward	6–9	220	Freshman	Baltimore, Maryland
15	Shakaris Laney	Guard	6–4	200	Sophomore	Philadelphia, Pennsylvania
21	Malik Toppin	Forward	6–8	200	Freshman	Bloomfield, New Jersey
22	George Davis III	Guard	6–0	185	Junior	Queens, New York
24	Jahlil Nails	Guard	6–5	185	Freshman	Forestville, Maryland
25	Malcolm Simmons	Forward	6–5	230	Junior	New London, Connecticut
34	Brandon Peel	Forward	6–7	200	Senior	Forestville, Maryland

== Schedule ==
Date time, TV	Opponent	Result	Record	Site (attendance) city, state
Exhibition
November 9, 2015*; 7:00 pm	Mitchell	W 94–66		William H. Detrick Gymnasium; New Britain, CT
Non-conference regular season
November 13, 2015*; 8:00 pm	Hartford; Connecticut 6 Classic	L 83–92	0–1	William H. Detrick Gymnasium; New Britain, CT
November 15, 2015*; 4:00 pm	at Penn	L 61–77	0–2	The Palestra (1,246); Philadelphia, PA
November 19, 2015*; 6:00 pm, ESPN3	at Boston College	L 57–82	0–3	Conte Forum (1,853); Chestnut Hill, MA
November 24, 2015*; 7:00 pm	Binghamton	L 75–81	0–4	William H. Detrick Gymnasium (1,012); New Britain, CT
November 29, 2015*; 4:00 pm	Maine	L 74–81	0–5	William H. Detrick Gymnasium (776); New Britain, CT
December 2, 2015*; 7:00 pm	at Brown	L 64–82	0–6	Pizzitola Sports Center (625); Providence, RI
December 5, 2015*; 4:00 pm	at Fordham	L 54–86	0–7	Rose Hill Gymnasium (1,992); Bronx, NY
December 8, 2015*; 6:00 pm, BTN	at Rutgers	L 59–75	0–8	The RAC (3,131); Piscataway, NJ
December 18, 2015*; 7:00 pm	UMass Lowell	W 83–79	1–8	William H. Detrick Gymnasium (1,207); New Britain, CT
December 23, 2015*; 12:30 pm, ESPNU	at UConn	L 52–99	1–9	XL Center (7,123); Hartford, CT
December 30, 2015*; 7:00 pm	Yale	L 42–62	1–10	William H. Detrick Gymnasium (1,237); New Britain, CT
Northeast Conference Regular Season
January 2, 2016; 4:00 pm	at Bryant	L 72–88	1–11 (0–1)	Chace Athletic Center (360); Smithfield, RI
January 4, 2016; 8:00 pm, MSG	LIU Brooklyn	L 67–76	1–12 (0–2)	William H. Detrick Gymnasium (1,067); New Britain, CT
January 7, 2016; 7:00 pm	at Mount St. Mary's	L 62–73	1–13 (0–3)	Knott Arena (2,215); Emmitsburg, MD
January 9, 2016 pm	at Fairleigh Dickinson	L 73–92	1–14 (0–4)	Rothman Center (387); Hackensack, NJ
January 14, 2016; 7:00 pm	Sacred Heart	L 78–80 ^{OT}	1–15 (0–5)	William H. Detrick Gymnasium (1,004); New Britain, CT
January 16, 2016; 4:00 pm	Wagner	L 48–70	1–16 (0–6)	Spiro Sports Center (1,632); Staten Island, NY
January 21, 2016; 7:00 pm	Robert Morris	L 45–59	1–17 (0–7)	William H. Detrick Gymnasium (1,017); New Britain, CT
January 23, 2016; 3:30 pm	Saint Francis (PA)	L 64–79	1–18 (0–8)	William H. Detrick Gymnasium (812); New Britain, CT
January 28, 2016; 7:00 pm	Bryant	W 78–67	2–18 (1–8)	William H. Detrick Gymnasium (1,012); New Britain, CT
January 30, 2016; 3:30 pm	St. Francis Brooklyn	L 49–60	2–19 (1–9)	William H. Detrick Gymnasium (1,217); New Britain, CT
February 4, 2016; 3:30 pm	at Robert Morris	W 65–60	3–19 (2–9)	Charles L. Sewall Center (1,615); Moon Township, PA
February 6, 2016; 4:00 pm	at Saint Francis (PA)	L 82–91	3–20 (2–10)	DeGol Arena (1,392); Loretto, PA
February 11, 2016; 7:00 pm	at St. Francis Brooklyn	L 67–74	3–21 (2–11)	Generoso Pope Athletic Complex (355); Brooklyn, NY
February 13, 2016; 3:30 pm	at Sacred Heart	L 52–87	3–22 (2–12)	William H. Pitt Center; Fairfield, CT
February 18, 2016; 7:00 pm	Mount St. Mary's	W 76–72	4–22 (3–12)	William H. Detrick Gymnasium (2,215); New Britain, CT
February 20, 2016; 3:30 pm	Wagner	L 57–83	4–23 (3–13)	William H. Detrick Gymnasium (1,428); New Britain, CT
February 25, 2016; 7:00 pm	at LIU Brooklyn	L 74–80	4–24 (3–14)	Steinberg Wellness Center (1,194); Brooklyn, NY
February 27, 2016; 3:30 pm	Fairleigh Dickinson	L 75–81	4–25 (3–15)	William H. Detrick Gymnasium (2,512); New Britain, CT
*Non-conference game. ^{#}Rankings from AP Poll. (#) Tournament seedings in parentheses. All times are in Eastern Time.
