= 2015–16 LIU Brooklyn Blackbirds men's basketball team =

American college basketball season

2015–16 LIU Brooklyn Blackbirds men's basketball
- Conference: Northeast Conference
- Record: 16–15 (9–9 NEC)
- Head coach: Jack Perri (4th season)
- Assistant coaches: Kenyon Spears (1st season); Chuck Bridge (5th season); Jim Mack (1st season)
- Home arena: Steinberg Wellness Center; Barclays Center

2015–16 Northeast Conference men's basketball standings
	Conf.				Overall
Team	W		L	PCT	W		L	PCT
Wagner	13	–	5	.722	23	–	11	.676
Fairleigh Dickinson †	11	–	7	.611	18	–	15	.545
Sacred Heart	11	–	7	.611	12	–	18	.400
St. Francis Brooklyn	11	–	7	.611	15	–	17	.469
Mount St. Mary's	10	–	8	.556	14	–	19	.424
LIU Brooklyn	9	–	9	.500	16	–	15	.516
Saint Francis	9	–	9	.500	13	–	17	.433
Robert Morris	8	–	10	.444	10	–	22	.313
Bryant	5	–	13	.278	8	–	23	.258
Central Connecticut	3	–	15	.167	4	–	25	.138
† 2016 NEC tournament winner

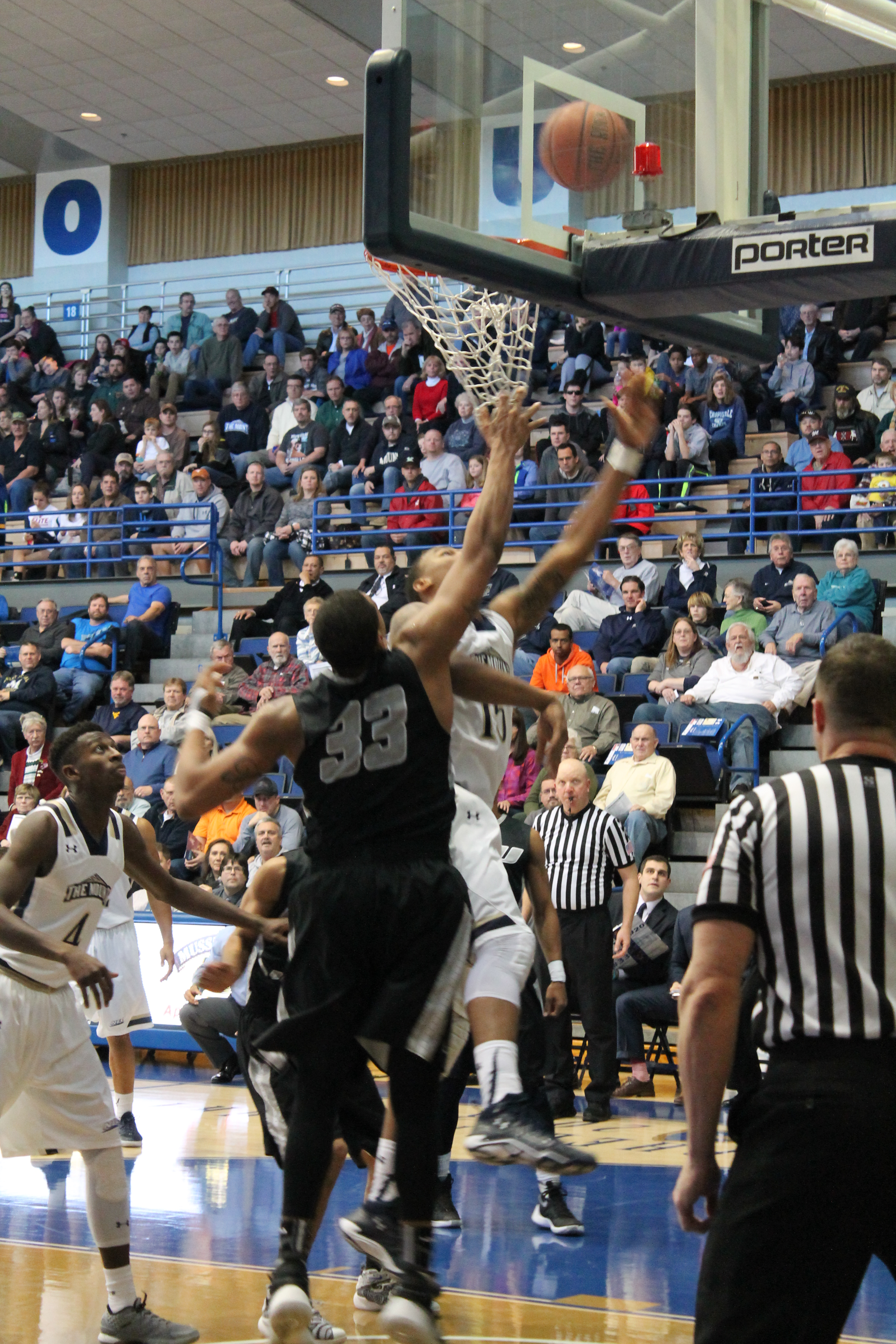
Jerome Frink contests a shot during the January 2 game against Mount St. Mary's.

The 2015–16 LIU Brooklyn Blackbirds men's basketball team represented The Brooklyn Campus of Long Island University during the 2015–16 NCAA Division I men's basketball season. The Blackbirds, led by fourth-year head coach Jack Perri, played their home games at the Steinberg Wellness Center, with several home games at the Barclays Center, and were members of the Northeast Conference. They finished the season 16–15, 9–9 in NEC play to finish in a tie for sixth place. They defeated Sacred Heart in the quarterfinals of the NEC tournament before losing to Wagner.

== Roster ==
2015–16 Long Island Blackbirds men's basketball team
Players
Coaches

Pos.	#	Name	Height	Weight	Year	Hometown
F	0	Kwe Askew	6 ft 7 in (2.01 m)	205 lb (93 kg)	Fr	Stamford, Connecticut
G/F	2	Trevin Woods	6 ft 6 in (1.98 m)	200 lb (91 kg)	So	Houston, Texas
G	3	Iverson Fleming	6 ft 1 in (1.85 m)	160 lb (73 kg)	Jr	North Brunswick, New Jersey
G/F	4	Trevon Woods	6 ft 6 in (1.98 m)	205 lb (93 kg)	So	Houston, Texas
G	11	Joel Hernandez	6 ft 3 in (1.91 m)	180 lb (82 kg)	Jr	Teaneck, New Jersey
G	12	Mitchell McMullen	5 ft 8 in (1.73 m)	165 lb (75 kg)	Fr	Schertz, Texas
F	13	Nura Zanna	6 ft 7 in (2.01 m)	240 lb (109 kg)	RS So	Kaduna, Nigeria
F	14	Mark Parisi	5 ft 11 in (1.8 m)	165 lb (75 kg)	So	Queens, New York
G	15	Martin Hermannsson	6 ft 3 in (1.91 m)	170 lb (77 kg)	So	Reykjavík, Iceland
G	20	Aakim Saintil	6 ft 0 in (1.83 m)	165 lb (75 kg)	Jr	West Orange, New Jersey
G	22	Raul Frias	6 ft 1 in (1.85 m)	165 lb (75 kg)	Fr	Miami, Florida
F/C	23	Glenn Feidanga	6 ft 8 in (2.03 m)	240 lb (109 kg)	Jr	Bangui, Central African Republic
G/F	24	Raiquan Clark	6 ft 4 in (1.93 m)	170 lb (77 kg)	Fr	New Haven, Connecticut
F	33	Jerome Frink	6 ft 7 in (2.01 m)	230 lb (104 kg)	RS Sr	Jersey City, New Jersey
F/C	44	Ganlandou Cisse	6 ft 9 in (2.06 m)	215 lb (98 kg)	Fr	Dakar, Senegal
F	53	Julius van Sauers	6 ft 8 in (2.03 m)	210 lb (95 kg)	Fr	Amsterdam, Netherlands

Head coach

- Jack Perri (Bentley)

Assistant coach(es)

- Mark Calzonetti (Bentley)
- Jason Harris (Rhode Island College)
- Chuck Bridge (Springfield)

Legend

- (C) Team captain
- (S) Suspended
- (I) Ineligible
- (W) Walk-on
- Injured
- Current redshirt

Roster
Last update: 2015-10-11

== Schedule ==
Date time, TV	Rank^{#}	Opponent^{#}	Result	Record	Site (attendance) city, state
Non-conference regular season
November 16, 2015*; 7:30 pm		at Loyola (MD)	W 71–68	1–0	Reitz Arena (512); Baltimore, MD
November 19, 2015*; 7:00 pm		Maine	W 84–79	2–0	Steinberg Wellness Center (1,345); Brooklyn, NY
November 22, 2015*; 12:00 pm		North Carolina Central	W 78–77	3–0	Barclays Center (1,274); Brooklyn, NY
November 25, 2015*; 7:00 pm, ASN		at FIU	L 72–80	3–1	FIU Arena (869); Miami, FL
November 29, 2015*; 2:00 pm		at Dartmouth	L 56–79	3–2	Leede Arena (777); Durham, NH
December 3, 2015*; 7:00 pm		UMass Lowell	W 84–72	4–2	Steinberg Wellness Center (1,114); Brooklyn, NY
December 8, 2015*; 7:00 pm		at Fordham	L 84–89	4–3	Rose Hill Gymnasium (1,595); Bronx, NY
December 12, 2015*; 3:00 pm, LCTV 21		at Niagara	W 80–79 ^{OT}	5–3	Gallagher Center (1,077); Lewiston, NY
December 18, 2015*; 7:00 pm		Sam Houston State	L 69–75	5–4	Steinberg Wellness Center (1,231); Brooklyn, NY
December 22, 2015*; 7:00 pm		Incarnate Word	W 66–59	6–4	Barclays Center (791); Brooklyn, NY
December 29, 2015*; 7:00 pm		at Massachusetts	L 79–83	6–5	Mullins Center (3,019); Amherst, MA
Northeast Conference regular season
January 2, 2016; 2:00 pm		at Mount St. Mary's	L 63–79	6–6 (0–1)	Knott Arena (2,315); Emmitsburg, MD
January 4, 2016 pm, MSG/FCS		at Central Connecticut	W 76–67	7–6 (1–1)	William H. Detrick Gymnasium (1,067); New Britain, CT
January 7, 2016; 7:00 pm		Robert Morris	L 60–70	7–7 (1–2)	Steinberg Wellness Center (1,003); Brooklyn, NY
January 9, 2016; 4:30 pm		Saint Francis	L 65–72	7–8 (1–3)	Steinberg Wellness Center (1,174); Brooklyn, NY
January 14, 2016; 7:00 pm		at Wagner	W 71–70	8–8 (2–3)	Spiro Sports Center (1,304); Staten Island, NY
January 16, 2016; 4:00 pm		at Bryant	W 79–61	9–8 (3–3)	Chace Athletic Center (82); Smithfield, RI
January 21, 2016; 7:00 pm		at Fairleigh Dickinson	L 95–101	9–9 (3–4)	Rothman Center (379); Hackensack, NJ
January 23, 2016; 3:00 pm, ESPN3		St. Francis Brooklyn; Battle of Brooklyn	L 49–64	9–10 (3–5)	Steinberg Wellness Center (417); Brooklyn, NY
January 27, 2016; 7:00 pm		Sacred Heart	W 92–84	10–10 (4–5)	Steinberg Wellness Center (1,176); Brooklyn, NY
January 30, 2016; 4:30 pm		Fairleigh Dickinson	L 85–88	10–11 (4–6)	Steinberg Wellness Center (1,375); Brooklyn, NY
February 4, 2016; 7:00 pm		Mount St. Mary's	W 77–74	11–11 (5–6)	Steinberg Wellness Center (1,143); Brooklyn, NY
February 6, 2016 pm		at Sacred Heart	L 90–98	11–12 (5–7)	William H. Pitt Center (632); Fairfield, CT
February 11, 2016; 7:00 pm		Wagner	W 82–69	12–12 (6–7)	Steinberg Wellness Center (1,475); Brooklyn, NY
February 13, 2016 pm, ESPNU		at St. Francis Brooklyn	W 82–67	13–12 (7–7)	Generoso Pope Athletic Complex (825); Brooklyn, NY
February 18, 2016; 7:00 pm		at Robert Morris	L 67–74	13–13 (7–8)	Charles L. Sewall Center (952); Moon Township, PA
February 20, 2016; 1:00 pm		Saint Francis (PA)	W 94–89 ^{OT}	14–13 (8–8)	DeGol Arena (1,531); Loretto, PA
February 25, 2016; 7:00 pm		Central Connecticut	W 80–74	15–13 (9–8)	Steinberg Wellness Center (1,194); Brooklyn, NY
February 27, 2016; 4:30 pm		Bryant	L 83–88	15–14 (9–9)	Steinberg Wellness Center (1,572); Brooklyn, NY
NEC tournament
March 2, 2016; 7:00 pm, MSG/FCS	(6)	at (3) Sacred Heart; Quarterfinals	W 84–76	16–14	William H. Pitt Center (710); Fairfield, CT
March 5, 2016; 4:00 pm, MSG+/FCS	(6)	at (1) Wagner; Semifinals	L 65–81	16–15	Spiro Sports Center (1,814); Staten Island, NY
*Non-conference game. ^{#}Rankings from AP Poll. (#) Tournament seedings in parentheses. All times are in Eastern Time.
