= 2015–16 Bryant Bulldogs men's basketball team =

American college basketball season

2015–16 Bryant Bulldogs men's basketball
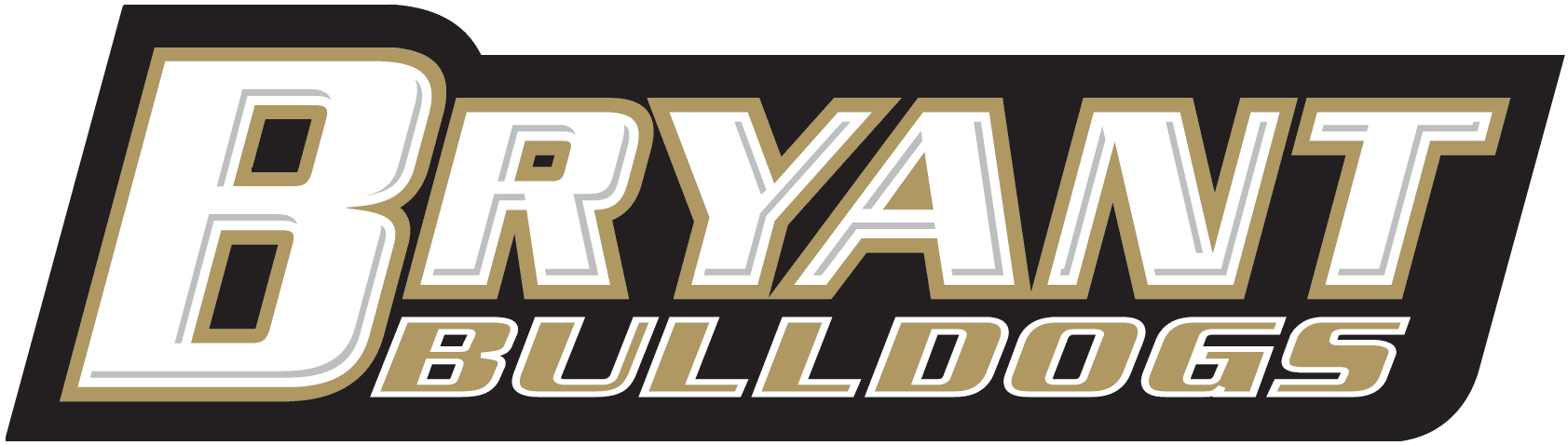
- Conference: Northeast Conference
- Record: 8–23 (5–13 NEC)
- Head coach: Tim O'Shea (8th season)
- Assistant coaches: Happy Dobbs; Chris Burns; Frankie Dobbs
- Home arena: Chace Athletic Center

2015–16 Northeast Conference men's basketball standings
	Conf.				Overall
Team	W		L	PCT	W		L	PCT
Wagner	13	–	5	.722	23	–	11	.676
Fairleigh Dickinson †	11	–	7	.611	18	–	15	.545
Sacred Heart	11	–	7	.611	12	–	18	.400
St. Francis Brooklyn	11	–	7	.611	15	–	17	.469
Mount St. Mary's	10	–	8	.556	14	–	19	.424
LIU Brooklyn	9	–	9	.500	16	–	15	.516
Saint Francis	9	–	9	.500	13	–	17	.433
Robert Morris	8	–	10	.444	10	–	22	.313
Bryant	5	–	13	.278	8	–	23	.258
Central Connecticut	3	–	15	.167	4	–	25	.138
† 2016 NEC tournament winner

The 2015–2016 Bryant Bulldogs men's basketball team represented Bryant University during the 2015–16 NCAA Division I men's basketball season. The team was led by eighth year head coach Tim O'Shea and played their home games at the Chace Athletic Center. They were members of the Northeast Conference. They finished the season 8–23, 5–13 in NEC play to finish in ninth place. They failed to qualify for the NEC tournament.

== Roster ==
Number	Name	Position	Height	Weight	Year	Hometown
0	Zach Chionuma	Guard	6–5	185	RS–Senior	Jamesville, New York
1	Hunter Ware	Guard	6–2	170	Sophomore	Powder Springs, Georgia
2	Nisre Zouzoua	Guard	6–2	190	Freshman	Brockton, Massachusetts
3	Bosko Kostur	Guard/Forward	6–7	215	RS–Sophomore	Melbourne, Australia
4	Shane McLaughlin	Guard	6–1	185	Senior	Old Tappan, New Jersey
5	Terrill Toe	Guard	6–0	165	Junior	Providence, Rhode Island
10	Taylor McHugh	Guard	6–2	170	Freshman	Centreville, Virginia
11	Justin Brickman	Guard	5–9	155	Junior	San Antonio, Texas
12	Marcel Pettway	Forward/Center	6–8	250	Freshman	Providence, Rhode Island
15	Ellis Williams	Forward	6–8	250	Junior	Columbus, Ohio
20	Gus Riley	Forward/Center	6–8	225	Sophomore	Nelson, New Zealand
22	Dan Garvin	Forward	6–6	215	Junior	Bethel, Connecticut
24	Dennis Levene	Forward	6–7	225	RS–Senior	Weston, Connecticut
34	Curtis Oakley	Forward	6–4	215	Senior	South Euclid, Ohio
44	Andrew Scocca	Forward	6–8	235	RS–Junior	Melrose, Massachusetts

== Schedule ==
Date time, TV	Opponent	Result	Record	Site (attendance) city, state
Non-conference regular season
November 14, 2015*; 8:00 pm, ESPN3	at No. 5 Duke; 2K Sports Classic Durham Regional	L 75–113	0–1	Cameron Indoor Stadium (9,314); Durham, NC
November 18, 2015*; 7:00 pm	Emerson	W 82–69	1–1	Chace Athletic Center (476); Smithfield, RI
November 20, 2015*; 7:00 pm	Prairie View A&M; 2K Sports Classic Subregional Semifinal	W 71–58	2–1	Chace Athletic Center (545); Smithfield, RI
November 21, 2015*; 7:00 pm	Siena; 2K Sports Classic Subregional Championship	L 59–78	2–2	Chace Athletic Center (568); Smithfield, RI
November 25, 2015*; 7:00 pm, ESPN3	at Harvard	L 45–80	2–3	Lavietes Pavilion (1,314); Cambridge, MA
November 28, 2015*; 12:00 pm, FS2	at Georgetown; 2K Sports Classic Washington Regional	L 47–77	2–4	Verizon Center (7,876); Washington, D.C.
November 30, 2015*; 7:00 pm	at New Hampshire	L 67–75	2–5	Lundholm Gym; Durham, NH
December 2, 2015*; 7:00 pm	at Yale	L 40–79	2–6	John J. Lee Amphitheater (696); New Haven, CT
December 5, 2015*; 4:00 pm	Brown; Ocean State Cup	L 68–76	2–7	Chace Athletic Center (536); Smithfield, RI
December 8, 2015*; 7:00 pm	Army	L 55–77	2–8	Chace Athletic Center (294); Smithfield, RI
December 12, 2015*; 12:00 pm, FS1	at No. 15 Providence; Ocean State Cup	L 67–74	2–9	Dunkin' Donuts Center (7,369); Providence, RI
December 23, 2015*; 7:00 pm, BTN	at Michigan	L 60-96	2–10	Crisler Center (11,491); Ann Arbor, MI
December 31, 2015*; 7:00 pm	at Dartmouth	W 62–60	3–10	Leede Arena (873); Hanover, NH
NEC regular season
January 2, 2016; 4:00 pm	Central Connecticut	W 88–72	4–10 (1–0)	Chace Athletic Center (360); Smithfield, RI
January 4, 2016 pm	at Fairleigh Dickinson	W 85–80	5–10 (2–0)	Rothman Center (468); Hackensack, NJ
January 7, 2016 pm, CBSSN	at Wagner	L 56–65	5–11 (2–1)	Spiro Sports Center (2,023); Staten Island, NY
January 9, 2016; 2:00 pm	at Mount St. Mary's	W 82–79 ^{2OT}	6–11 (3–1)	Knott Arena (2,190); Emmitsburg, MD
January 14, 2016; 7:00 pm	St. Francis Brooklyn	W 61–59	7–11 (4–1)	Chace Athletic Center (423); Smithfield, RI
January 16, 2016; 4:00 pm	LIU Brooklyn	L 61–79	7–12 (4–2)	Chace Athletic Center (82); Smithfield, RI
January 21, 2016; 7:00 pm	Saint Francis (PA)	L 65–71	7–13 (4–3)	Chace Athletic Center (365); Smithfield, RI
January 23, 2016; 4:00 pm, ESPN3	Robert Morris	L 54–65	7–14 (4–4)	Chace Athletic Center (323); Smithfield, RI
January 28, 2016; 7:00 pm	at Central Connecticut	L 67–78	7–15 (4–5)	William H. Detrick Gymnasium (1,012); New Britain, CT
January 30, 2016; 3:30 pm	at Sacred Heart	L 71–72	7–16 (4–6)	William H. Pitt Center (728); Fairfield, CT
February 4, 2016; 7:00 pm	at Saint Francis (PA)	L 57–63	7–17 (4–7)	DeGol Arena (1,062); Loretto, PA
February 6, 2016; 4:00 pm	at Robert Morris	L 71–89	7–18 (4–8)	Charles L. Sewall Center (1,709); Moon Township, PA
February 11, 2016; 7:00 pm, MSG/FCS	Fairleigh Dickinson	L 77–91	7–19 (4–9)	Chace Athletic Center (689); Smithfield, RI
February 13, 2016; 4:00 pm	Wagner	L 55–79	7–20 (4–10)	Chace Athletic Center (427); Smithfield, RI
February 18, 2016; 7:00 pm	Sacred Heart	L 57–74	7–21 (4–11)	Chace Athletic Center (431); Smithfield, RI
February 20, 2016; 4:00 pm	Mount St. Mary's	L 53–71	7–22 (4–12)	Chace Athletic Center (580); Smithfield, RI
February 25, 2016; 7:00 pm	at St. Francis Brooklyn	L 72–79	7–23 (4–13)	Generoso Pope Athletic Complex (465); Brooklyn, NY
February 27, 2016; 4:30 pm	at LIU Brooklyn	W 88–83	8–23 (5–13)	Steinberg Wellness Center (1,572); Brooklyn, NY
*Non-conference game. ^{#}Rankings from AP Poll. (#) Tournament seedings in parentheses. All times are in Eastern Time..
