= 2015–16 Mount St. Mary's Mountaineers men's basketball team =

American college basketball season

2015–16 Mount St. Mary's Mountaineers men's basketball
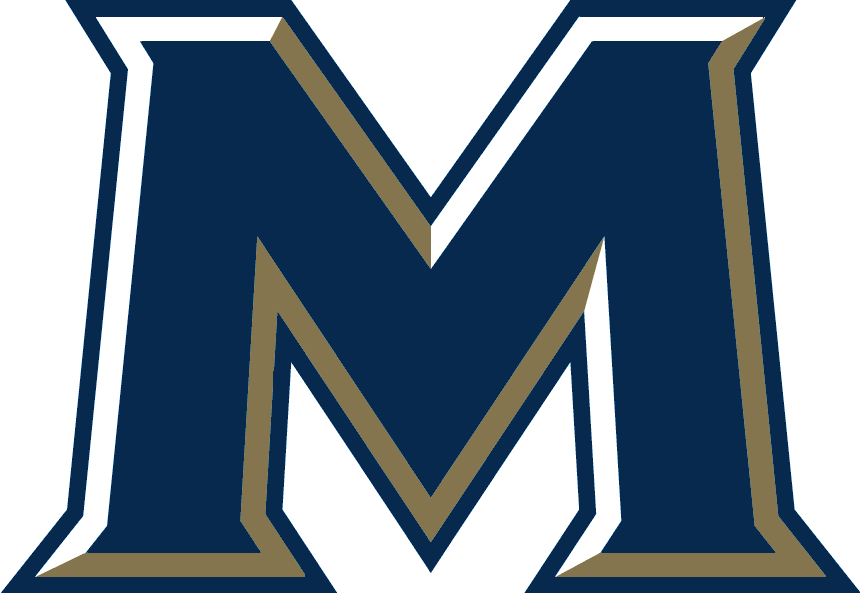
- Conference: Northeast Conference
- Record: 14–19 (10–8 NEC)
- Head coach: Jamion Christian (4th season)
- Assistant coaches: Ben Wilkins; Darryl Bruce; Donny Lind
- Home arena: Knott Arena

2015–16 Northeast Conference men's basketball standings
	Conf.				Overall
Team	W		L	PCT	W		L	PCT
Wagner	13	–	5	.722	23	–	11	.676
Fairleigh Dickinson †	11	–	7	.611	18	–	15	.545
Sacred Heart	11	–	7	.611	12	–	18	.400
St. Francis Brooklyn	11	–	7	.611	15	–	17	.469
Mount St. Mary's	10	–	8	.556	14	–	19	.424
LIU Brooklyn	9	–	9	.500	16	–	15	.516
Saint Francis	9	–	9	.500	13	–	17	.433
Robert Morris	8	–	10	.444	10	–	22	.313
Bryant	5	–	13	.278	8	–	23	.258
Central Connecticut	3	–	15	.167	4	–	25	.138
† 2016 NEC tournament winner

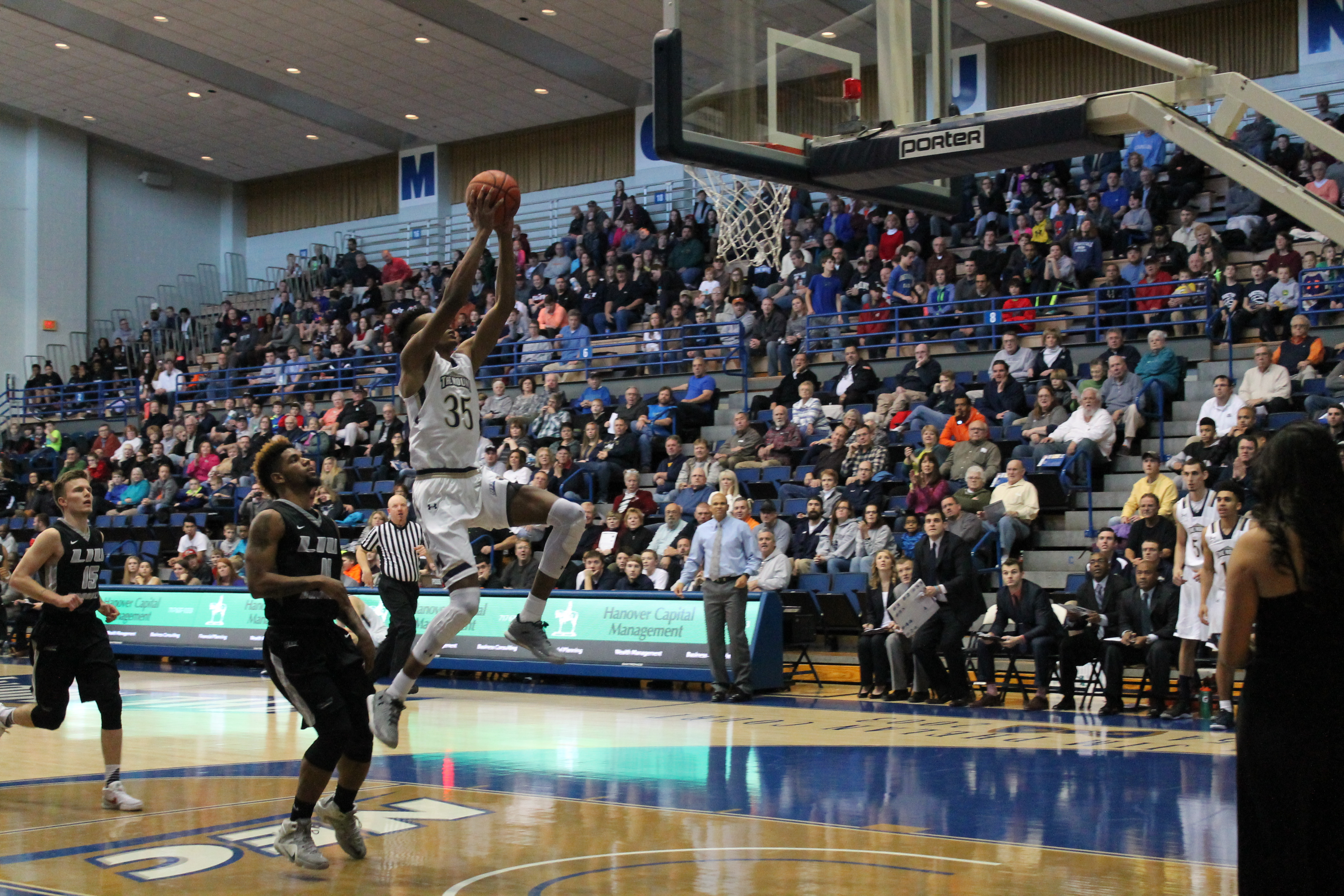
Chris Wray leaps for a layup during the January 2 game against LIU Brooklyn at Knott Arena.

The 2015–16 Mount St. Mary's Mountaineers men's basketball team represented Mount St. Mary's University during the 2015–16 NCAA Division I men's basketball season. The Mountaineers, led by fourth-year head coach Jamion Christian, played their home games at Knott Arena and were members of the Northeast Conference.

Newcomers to the team included incoming freshmen Bryce Thurston and Elijah Long, the latter of whom committed to the Mountaineers after originally planning to play for Florida Gulf Coast. Guard Marcell Haskett signed with the Mountaineers, but later re-opened his recruiting and enrolled in a prep school instead.

Returning players included Byron "BK" Ashe and Gregory Graves, who were both members of the NEC's All-Conference Third Team the previous season. Lamont "Junior" Robinson, now a sophomore, was named to the All-Conference Rookie Team in his freshman year.

They finished the season 14–19, 10–8 in NEC play to finish in fifth place. They defeated St. Francis Brooklyn in the first round of the NEC tournament to advance to the semifinals where they lost to Fairleigh Dickinson.

== Previous season ==
The 2014–15 Mountaineers finished the regular season with a record of 15–14 (11–7 in the Northeast Conference) and qualified for the conference tournament as the #4 seed. They were knocked off by #5 seed Saint Francis (PA) at home in the first game of the tournament, finishing the season at 15–15.

== Departures ==
Name	Number	Pos.	Height	Weight	Year	Hometown	Notes
Chris Martin	0	G	6'0"	185	Junior	Upper Marlboro, MD	Transferred to Savannah State University
Kristijan Krajina	13	F	6'11"	245	Graduate Student	Osijek, Croatia	Graduated, signed with GKK Šibenik in Croatia
Maalik Howard	21	G	6'0"	170	Junior	Woodbridge, VA	Left team for personal reasons
Andrew Smeathers	30	F	6'8"	205	Junior	Bargersville, IN	Left school for personal reasons
Aaron Brown	34	F	6'7"	220	Senior	Fort Worth, TX	Graduated

== Roster ==
2015–16 Mount St. Mary's Mountaineers men's basketball team
Players
Coaches

Pos.	#	Name	Height	Weight	Year	Previous school	Hometown
C	50	Taylor Danaher	7 ft 0 in (2.13 m)	225 lb (102 kg)	RS Sr	Fredericksburg Christian School	Fredericksburg, Virginia
G	5	Liam MacManimon (W)	5 ft 10 in (1.78 m)	160 lb (73 kg)	Sr	Holy Spirit High School	Galloway, New Jersey
F	15	Gregory Graves	6 ft 7 in (2.01 m)	235 lb (107 kg)	Sr	Potomac Falls High School	Sterling, Virginia
G	2	Byron "BK" Ashe	6 ft 1 in (1.85 m)	170 lb (77 kg)	Jr	Friendship Collegiate	Washington, D.C.
G	4	Khalid Nwandu	6 ft 3 in (1.91 m)	180 lb (82 kg)	Jr	Northeastern High School	York, Pennsylvania
F	11	Will Miller	6 ft 6 in (1.98 m)	200 lb (91 kg)	Jr	Highland Park High School	Dallas, Texas
G	12	Charles Glover	6 ft 1 in (1.85 m)	190 lb (86 kg)	RS So	Gonzaga College High School	Bowie, Maryland
G	3	Junior Robinson	5 ft 5 in (1.65 m)	165 lb (75 kg)	So	Eastern Alamance High School	Mebane, North Carolina
F	35	Chris Wray	6 ft 8 in (2.03 m)	190 lb (86 kg)	So	Fishburne Military School	Shelby, North Carolina
C	1	Mawdo Sallah	6 ft 8 in (2.03 m)	225 lb (102 kg)	So	Broadfording Christian Academy	Latri Kunda, Gambia
F	22	Troy Henderson	6 ft 9 in (2.06 m)	190 lb (86 kg)	RS Fr	Gaston Day School	Gastonia, North Carolina
F	14	Chris Manning	6 ft 7 in (2.01 m)	205 lb (93 kg)	RS Fr	Randallstown High School	Randallstown, Maryland
G	25	Bryce Thurston	6 ft 5 in (1.96 m)	200 lb (91 kg)	Fr	Montverde Academy	Baltimore, Maryland
G	13	Elijah Mitrou-Long	6 ft 0 in (1.83 m)	175 lb (79 kg)	Fr	The John Carroll School	Mississauga, Ontario

Head coach

- Jamion Christian

Assistant coach(es)

- Ben Wilkins
- Darryl Bruce
- Donny Lind

Legend

- (C) Team captain
- (S) Suspended
- (I) Ineligible
- (W) Walk-on
- Injured
- Current redshirt

Roster
Last update: 08/25/2015

== Pre-season ==
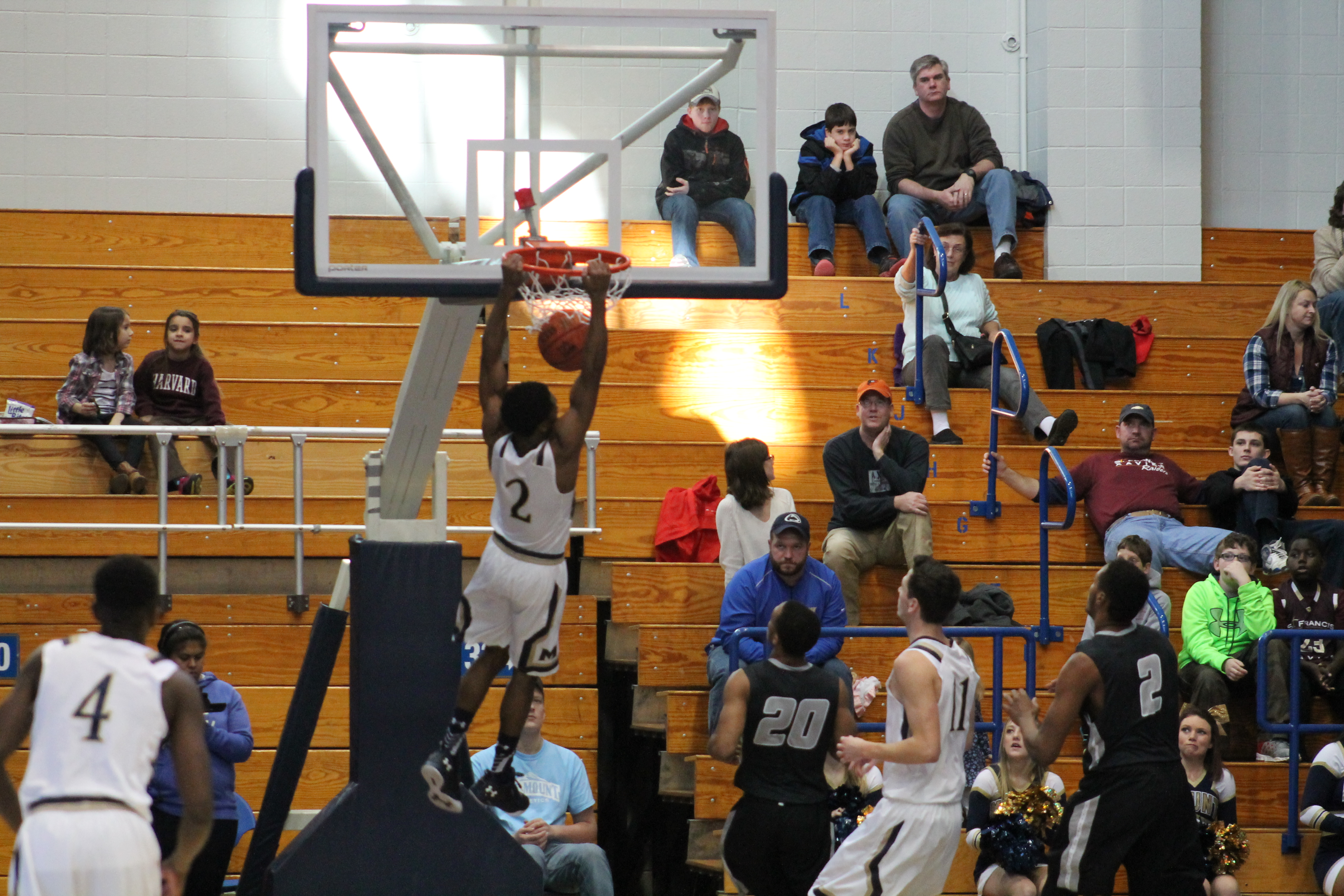
Byron "BK" Ashe, seen here completing a slam dunk during the January 2 game against LIU Brooklyn, was named to the NEC's All-Conference First Team prior to the season.

Greg Alexander, a shooting guard who played two seasons at East Carolina, transferred to Mount St. Mary's in June 2015. Due to NCAA transfer rules, Alexander will sit out the 2015–16 season and will join the Mountaineers in 2016–17 with two seasons of eligibility remaining.

In June 2015, the website Big Apple Buckets, which covers college basketball in the Northeast, named guard Byron "BK" Ashe and forward Gregory Graves as prospective members of its NEC All-Conference First Team. Ashe was described as a "stud ... as evident from his fantastic 119.1 offensive rating in league play (in the 2014–15 season)," while Graves "edge(d) out a group of impressive power forwards thanks to his athleticism, tenacity and efficiency around the rim."

In October, Northeast Conference head coaches voted the Mountaineers as the league's favorite prior to the season. This marked the fifth time in the team's history it was voted preseason favorites, with the most recent being 2009–10.

Ashe and Graves were voted to the official 2015–16 Preseason All-NEC Men's Basketball Team.

== Schedule ==
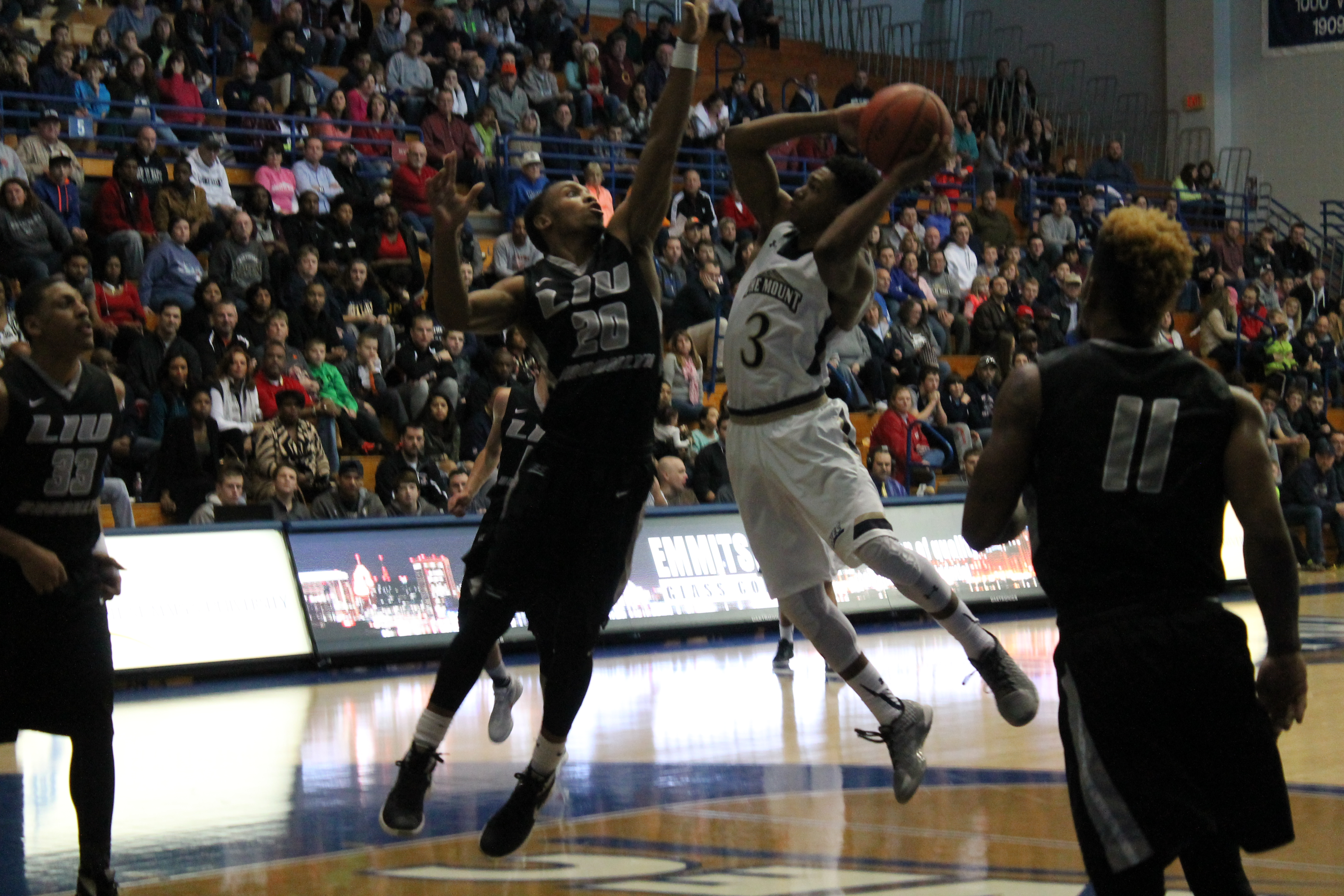
Lamont "Junior" Robinson takes a contested shot during the January 2 game against LIU Brooklyn at Knott Arena.

Prior to the regular season, the Mountaineers won two exhibition games at Knott Arena: 64–44 over Hood College and 79–63 over Randolph–Macon College.

The Mountaineers opened the regular season with an 80–56 loss against the #3-ranked team in the nation, Maryland. Mount St. Mary's also lost its second game, 76–54 to Ohio State.

The Mountaineers fell to 0–3 with a 100–67 loss to Washington, then to 0–4 with a 101–56 loss to #10 Gonzaga. Both games were part of the Battle 4 Atlantis mainland bracket. Also as part of the tournament, the Mountaineers fell to 0–5 with a 79–74 Thanksgiving Day loss to Elon. The Mountaineers finished last place in the tournament, and fell to 0–6 on the season, with a 69–60 loss to Furman.

In its first non-conference home games, the Mountaineers defeated Patriot League opponents American, 81–56, Loyola (MD), 85–68, and Bucknell, 81–73. The Mountaineers also visited Patriot League opponent Lehigh, losing 76–73.

In an intrastate road game, the Mountaineers lost to UMBC, 75–63. They also dropped road games to James Madison (73–53) and Binghamton (62–53).

Mount St. Mary's finished out-of-conference play with a 3–10 record, winning all three of their home games while going 0–10 on the road.

The Mountaineers opened conference play on January 2 with a 79–63 win at Knott Arena over LIU Brooklyn, the team's first win in a conference home opener since the 2007–08 season. They improved to 2–0 in-conference two days later with a 44–40 overtime win over St. Francis Brooklyn. The Mountaineers got to 3–0 on the NEC season with a home win over Central Connecticut, 73–62, before blowing a 20–point lead and dropping a home game to Bryant, 82–79 in double overtime.

In its first conference road game, Mount St. Mary's jumped out to a 30–point halftime lead and beat Robert Morris 76–52. The Mountaineers moved to 5–1 in conference play with another road victory, 82–72 over Saint Francis (PA). A loss to Sacred Heart, 76–71, dropped the Mountaineers to 5–2 on the conference season.

The Mountaineers' game against Fairleigh Dickinson, originally scheduled for January 23, was postponed by one day due to the January 2016 United States winter storm. When the game was played, Mount St. Mary's won 87–72 to improve to 6–2 in-conference and take over first place.

Mount St. Mary's improved to 7–2 in-conference and completed a season sweep of Robert Morris on January 28 with a 70–49 victory. In their next game, however, the Mountaineers fell behind by 22 points by halftime against Wagner and ultimately lost 73–63. The Mount lost a second consecutive game on February 4, falling 77–74 to LIU Brooklyn. The team's losing streak extended to three two days later, when Wagner blew out the Mountaineers, 72–51, to complete a season sweep.

On February 11, the Mountaineers snapped their losing streak with a 66–61 win over Sacred Heart. The Mountaineers won again by a 66–61 score two days later, completing a season sweep of Saint Francis (PA). The Mount was then upset on the road by Central Connecticut, 76–72.

The Mountaineers were able to hand Bryant its 11th-straight loss, with a 71–53 victory February 20. On February 25, in their final regular-season home game, the Mount fell 67–54 to Fairleigh Dickinson.

Mount St. Mary's finished the regular-season with a 55–49 loss to St. Francis Brooklyn, finishing fifth in the conference with a 10–8 record.

== Post-season ==
The Mountaineers earned the #5 seed in the 2016 Northeast Conference men's basketball tournament and visited #4 seed St. Francis Brooklyn in the quarterfinal round on March 2. In that game, the Mountaineers came back from a 14–point second-half deficit and defeated the Terriers, 60–51.

The Mount St. Mary's season came to an end with an 80–75 loss to Fairleigh Dickinson in the conference semifinals on March 5.

Date time, TV	Rank^{#}	Opponent^{#}	Result	Record	High points	High rebounds	High assists	Site (attendance) city, state
Exhibition
Nov 3, 2015*; 7:00 pm		Hood	W 64–44	–	13 – Graves	8 – Graves	3 – Robinson, Wray	Knott Arena (925); Emmitsburg, MD
Nov 7, 2015*; 5:00 pm		Randolph–Macon	W 79–63	–	22 – Robinson	4 – Ashe, Glover, Graves, Long	3 – Long, Robinson	Knott Arena (900); Emmitsburg, MD
Regular season
Nov 13, 2015*; 7:00 pm, BTN		at No. 3 Maryland	L 56–80	0–1	18 – Ashe	7 – Ashe	5 – Robinson	Xfinity Center (17,590); College Park, MD
Nov 15, 2015*; 12:00 pm, ESPNU		at Ohio State	L 56–74	0–2	16 – Robinson	4 – Danaher, Glover	2 – Ashe, Glover	Value City Arena (11,590); Columbus, OH
Nov 19, 2015*; 10:30 pm, P12N		at Washington; Battle 4 Atlantis	L 67–100	0–3	16 – Robinson	6 – Ashe	2 – Danaher, Long	Hec Edmundson Pavilion (5,381); Seattle, WA
Nov 21, 2015*; 9:00 pm, KHQ/RTNW		at No. 10 Gonzaga; Battle 4 Atlantis	L 56–101	0–4	16 – Ashe	5 – Graves, Long, Nwandu	2 – Nwandu	McCarthey Athletic Center (6,000); Spokane, WA
Nov 26, 2015*; 2:00 pm		at Elon; Battle 4 Atlantis	L 74–79	0–5	25 – Ashe	8 – Danaher	4 – Robinson	Alumni Gym (611); Elon, NC
Nov 27, 2015*; 4:30 pm		vs. Furman; Battle 4 Atlantis	L 60–69	0–6	11 – Ashe, Graves	6 – Graves	6 – Robinson	Alumni Gym (847); Elon, NC
Dec 1, 2015*; 7:00 pm		American	W 81–56	1–6	19 – Danaher	7 – Glover	7 – Robinson	Knott Arena (1,504); Emmitsburg, MD
Dec 5, 2015*; 2:00 pm, MASN		Loyola (MD); Catholic Clash	W 85–68	2–6	22 – Ashe	10 – Graves	6 – Robinson	Knott Arena (2,418); Emmitsburg, MD
Dec 8, 2015*; 7:00 pm		Bucknell	W 81–73	3–6	19 – Robinson	5 – Glover, Graves	9 – Robinson	Knott Arena (1,789); Emmitsburg, MD
Dec 12, 2015*; 1:00 pm		at UMBC	L 63–75	3–7	23 – Ashe	6 – Danaher	7 – Robinson	Retriever Activities Center (826); Catonsville, MD
Dec 19, 2015*; 7:00 pm		at Lehigh	L 73–76	3–8	22 – Glover	5 – Danaher, Wray	7 – Glover	Stabler Arena (673); Bethlehem, PA
Dec 22, 2015*; 7:00 pm		at James Madison	L 53–73	3–9	17 – Glover	7 – Graves	5 – Long	Convocation Center (2,291); Harrisonburg, VA
Dec 29, 2015*; 7:00 pm		at Binghamton	L 53–62	3–10	10 – Ashe	7 – Danaher	3 – Graves, Robinson	Binghamton University Events Center (3,721); Binghamton, NY
NEC regular season
Jan 2, 2016; 2:00 pm		LIU Brooklyn	W 79–61	4–10 (1–0)	16 – Ashe	5 – Graves, Wray	4 – Long, Robinson	Knott Arena (2,315); Emmitsburg, MD
Jan 4, 2016; 7:00 pm		St. Francis Brooklyn	W 44–40 ^{OT}	5–10 (2–0)	13 – Robinson	9 – Graves	2 – Ashe	Knott Arena (1,120); Emmitsburg, MD
Jan 7, 2016; 7:00 pm		Central Connecticut	W 73–62	6–10 (3–0)	17 – Robinson	6 – Glover	2 – Graves, Long, Robinson	Knott Arena (2,315); Emmitsburg, MD
Jan 9, 2016; 2:00 pm		Bryant	L 79–82 ^{2OT}	6–11 (3–1)	20 – Robinson	9 – Graves	3 – Ashe, Long, Robinson	Knott Arena (2,190); Emmitsburg, MD
Jan 14, 2016; 7:00 pm		at Robert Morris	W 76–52	7–11 (4–1)	17 – Ashe	10 – Ashe	4 – Long, Robinson	Charles L. Sewall Center (1,547); Moon Township, PA
Jan 16, 2016; 12:00 pm, ESPN3/MASN		at Saint Francis (PA)	W 82–72	8–11 (5–1)	18 – Graves	6 – Danaher	5 – Robinson	DeGol Arena (1,128); Loretto, PA
Jan 21, 2016; 7:00 pm, CBSSN		at Sacred Heart	L 71–76	8–12 (5–2)	20 – Long	7 – Ashe	3 – Long, Robinson	William H. Pitt Center (1,502); Fairfield, CT
Jan 24, 2016; 2:00 pm		at Fairleigh Dickinson; Postponed from Jan 23	W 87–72	9–12 (6–2)	22 – Graves	9 – Danaher	6 – Long	Rothman Center; Hackensack, NJ
Jan 28, 2016; 7:00 pm, CBSSN		Robert Morris	W 70–49	10–12 (7–2)	19 – Ashe	7 – Danaher	4 – Long	Knott Arena (2,421); Emmitsburg, MD
Jan 30, 2016; 3:00 pm		Wagner	L 63–73	10–13 (7–3)	21 – Ashe	6 – Wray	3 – Robinson	Knott Arena (3,121); Emmitsburg, MD
Feb 4, 2016; 7:00 pm		at LIU Brooklyn	L 74–77	10–14 (7–4)	21 – Ashe	7 – Danaher	4 – Graves	Steinberg Wellness Center (1,143); Brooklyn, NY
Feb 6, 2016; 4:00 pm		at Wagner	L 51–72	10–15 (7–5)	14 – Robinson	9 – Graves	2 – Ashe, Nwandu, Robinson	Spiro Sports Center (2,082); Staten Island, NY
Feb 11, 2016; 7:00 pm		Sacred Heart	W 66–61	11–15 (8–5)	26 – Robinson	9 – Wray	3 – Nwandu, Robinson	Knott Arena (2,014); Emmitsburg, MD
Feb 13, 2016; 3:00 pm, ESPN3		Saint Francis (PA)	W 66–61	12–15 (9–5)	21 – Robinson	11 – Graves	4 – Robinson	Knott Arena (3,121); Emmitsburg, MD
Feb 18, 2016; 7:00 pm		at Central Connecticut	L 72–76	12–16 (9–6)	18 – Robinson	7 – Ashe	3 – Long	William H. Detrick Gymnasium (2,215); New Britain, CT
Feb 20, 2016; 4:00 pm		at Bryant	W 71–53	13–16 (10–6)	17 – Robinson	10 – Ashe	3 – Ashe, Long, Robinson	Chace Athletic Center (580); Smithfield, RI
Feb 25, 2016; 7:00 pm		Fairleigh Dickinson	L 54–67	13–17 (10–7)	16 – Robinson	7 – Ashe, Graves	2 – Glover, Graves, Robinson	Knott Arena (2,260); Emmitsburg, MD
Feb 27, 2016; 4:00 pm		at St. Francis Brooklyn	L 49–55	13–18 (10–8)	16 – Long	9 – Wray	1 – Glover, Graves, Long, Nwandu, Robinson	Pope Physical Education Center (675); Brooklyn, NY
NEC tournament
March 2, 2016; 9:00 pm	(5)	at (4) St. Francis Brooklyn; Quarterfinals	W 60–51	14–18	18 – Ashe	7 – Ashe, Graves	4 – Ashe	Pope Physical Education Center (675); Brooklyn, NY
March 5, 2016; 2:00 pm, MSG/FCS	(5)	at (2) Fairleigh Dickinson; Semifinals	L 75–80	14–19	21 – Robinson	7 – Ashe	2 – Ashe, Long, Robinson	Rothman Center (1,562); Hackensack, NJ
*Non-conference game. ^{#}Rankings from AP Poll. (#) Tournament seedings in parentheses. All times are in Eastern Time.
