= 2015–16 Sacred Heart Pioneers men's basketball team =

American college basketball season

2015–16 Sacred Heart Pioneers men's basketball
- Conference: Northeast Conference
- Record: 12–18 (11–7 NEC)
- Head coach: Anthony Latina (3rd season)
- Assistant coaches: Johnny Kidd; Kevin Papacs; Kyle Steinway
- Home arena: William H. Pitt Center

2015–16 Northeast Conference men's basketball standings
	Conf.				Overall
Team	W		L	PCT	W		L	PCT
Wagner	13	–	5	.722	23	–	11	.676
Fairleigh Dickinson †	11	–	7	.611	18	–	15	.545
Sacred Heart	11	–	7	.611	12	–	18	.400
St. Francis Brooklyn	11	–	7	.611	15	–	17	.469
Mount St. Mary's	10	–	8	.556	14	–	19	.424
LIU Brooklyn	9	–	9	.500	16	–	15	.516
Saint Francis	9	–	9	.500	13	–	17	.433
Robert Morris	8	–	10	.444	10	–	22	.313
Bryant	5	–	13	.278	8	–	23	.258
Central Connecticut	3	–	15	.167	4	–	25	.138
† 2016 NEC tournament winner

The 2015–16 Sacred Heart Pioneers men's basketball team represented Sacred Heart University during the 2015–16 NCAA Division I men's basketball season. This was the Pioneers' 17th season of NCAA Division I basketball, all played in the Northeast Conference. Third-year head coach Anthony Latina led the Pioneers and played their home games at the William H. Pitt Center. They finished the season 12–18, 11–7 in NEC play to finish in a three-way tie for second place. They lost to LIU Brooklyn in the quarterfinals of the NEC tournament.

== Roster ==
Number	Name	Position	Height	Weight	Year	Hometown
0	Jordan Allen	Forward	6–6	210	Graduate	Bayshore, New York
1	Cane Broome	Guard	6–0	150	Sophomore	East Hartford, Connecticut
3	Cole Walton	Center	6–11	215	Junior	Bellevue, Washington
5	De'von Barnett	Forward	6–5	193	Junior	Waldorf, Maryland
11	Quincy McKnight	Guard	6–3	180	Freshman	Bridgeport, Connecticut
13	Cavan LaRose	Forward	6–3	185	Junior	Ogdensburg, New York
14	Chris Robinson	Guard	6–3	153	Sophomore	The Bronx, New York
15	Jermaine Ukaegbu	Forward	6–5	190	Freshman	Silver Spring, Maryland
22	Sean Hoehn	Guard	6–2	175	Freshman	Morristown, New Jersey
30	Eyimofe Edukugho	Forward	6–6	210	Senior	Warri, Nigeria
31	Mario Matasovic	Forward	6–8	215	Junior	Gornja Vrba, Croatia
32	Travis Berry	Guard	6–4	175	Junior	Elmont, New York
33	Filip Nowicki	Center	6–10	260	Sophomore	Wloclawek, Poland
34	Tevin Falzon	Forward	6–7	229	Senior	Newton, Massachusetts
44	Matej Buovac	Forward	6–7	215	Senior	Zagreb, Croatia

== Schedule ==
Date time, TV	Rank^{#}	Opponent^{#}	Result	Record	Site (attendance) city, state
Exhibition
October 31, 2015*; 1:00 pm		Bridgeport	W 101–94		William H. Pitt Center; Fairfield, CT
Non-conference regular season
November 13, 2015*; 5:30 pm		Quinnipiac; Connecticut 6 Classic	W 76–64	1–0	William H. Detrick Gymnasium; New Britain, CT
November 16, 2015*; 7:00 pm		at Yale	L 77–99	1–1	John J. Lee Amphitheater (778); New Haven, CT
November 18, 2015*; 7:00 pm		at UMass Lowell	L 84–87	1–2	Tsongas Center (1,795); Lowell, MA
November 21, 2015*; 7:00 pm		at Fairfield	L 79–83 ^{OT}	1–3	Webster Bank Arena (3,251); Bridgeport, CT
November 25, 2015*; 1:05 pm		at Holy Cross	L 60–69	1–4	Hart Center (1,104); Worcester, MA
December 2, 2015*; 7:00 pm, SNY		at UConn	L 49–82	1–5	XL Center (8,563); Hartford, CT
December 5, 2015*; 2:00 pm		at Towson	L 61–83	1–6	SECU Arena (1,303); Towson, MD
December 12, 2015*; 3:30 pm		Lafayette	L 86–90	1–7	William H. Pitt Center (619); Fairfield, CT
December 14, 2015*; 8:30 pm		at Hartford	L 71–80	1–8	Chase Arena at Reich Family Pavilion (1,822); Hartford, CT
December 21, 2015*; 7:00 pm, BTN		Northwestern	L 67–103	1–9	Welsh-Ryan Arena (6,574); Evanston, IL
December 28, 2015*; 7:00 pm		at Hofstra	L 73–80	1–10	Mack Sports Complex (1,313); Hempstead, NY
Northeast Conference regular season
January 2, 2016; 4:00 pm		at Robert Morris	W 69–65	2–10 (1–0)	Charles L. Sewall Center (1,334); Moon Township, PA
January 4, 2016; 4:00 pm		at Saint Francis (PA)	L 80–84	2–11 (1–1)	DeGol Arena (539); Loretto, PA
January 7, 2016 pm		No. Fairleigh Dickinson	L 68–80	2–12 (1–2)	William H. Pitt Center (354); Fairfield, CT
January 9, 2016 pm		Wagner	L 59–76	2–13 (1–3)	William H. Pitt Center (355); Fairfield, CT
January 14, 2016; 7:00 pm		at Central Connecticut	W 80–78 ^{OT}	3–13 (2–3)	William H. Detrick Gymnasium (1,004); New Britain, CT
January 16, 2016; 4:00 pm		at St. Francis Brooklyn	L 67–85	3–14 (2–4)	Generoso Pope Athletic Complex (325); Brooklyn, NY
January 21, 2016; 7:00 pm, CBSSN		Mount St. Mary's	W 76–71	4–14 (3–4)	William H. Pitt Center (1,502); Fairfield, CT
January 24, 2016; 4:00 pm		at Wagner; Postponed from 1/23/16	W 67–58	5–14 (4–4)	Spiro Sports Center (731); Staten Island, NY
January 27, 2016; 7:00 pm, MSG/FCS		at LIU Brooklyn	L 84–92	5–15 (4–5)	Steinberg Wellness Center (1,176); Brooklyn, NY
January 30, 2016; 3:30 pm		Bryant	W 72–71	6–15 (5–5)	William H. Pitt Center (728); Fairfield, CT
February 4, 2016; 7:00 pm		St. Francis Brooklyn	W 74–70	7–15 (6–5)	William H. Pitt Center; Fairfield, CT
February 6, 2016; 3:30 pm		LIU Brooklyn	W 98–90	8–15 (7–5)	William H. Pitt Center (632); Fairfield, CT
February 11, 2016; 7:00 pm		at Mount St. Mary's	L 61–66	8–16 (7–6)	Knott Arena (2,014); Emmitsburg, MD
February 13, 2016; 3:30 pm		Central Connecticut	W 87–52	9–16 (8–6)	William H. Pitt Center; Fairfield, CT
February 18, 2016; 7:00 pm		at Bryant	W 74–57	10–16 (9–6)	Chace Athletic Center (431); Smithfield, RI
February 20, 2016; 4:30 pm, ESPN3		at Fairleigh Dickinson	W 91–86	11–16 (10–6)	Rothman Center (1,228); Hackensack, NJ
February 25, 2016; 7:00 pm		Robert Morris	L 63–73	11–17 (10–7)	William H. Pitt Center (312); Fairfield, CT
February 27, 2016; 3:30 pm		Saint Francis (PA)	W 88–78	12–17 (11–7)	William H. Pitt Center (711); Fairfield, CT
NEC tournament
March 2, 2016; 7:00 pm, MSG/FCS	(3)	(6) LIU Brooklyn; Quarterfinals	L 76–84	12–18	William H. Pitt Center (710); Fairfield, CT
*Non-conference game. ^{#}Rankings from AP Poll. (#) Tournament seedings in parentheses. All times are in Eastern Time..
