= 2015–16 Wagner Seahawks men's basketball team =

American college basketball season

2015–16 Wagner Seahawks men's basketball
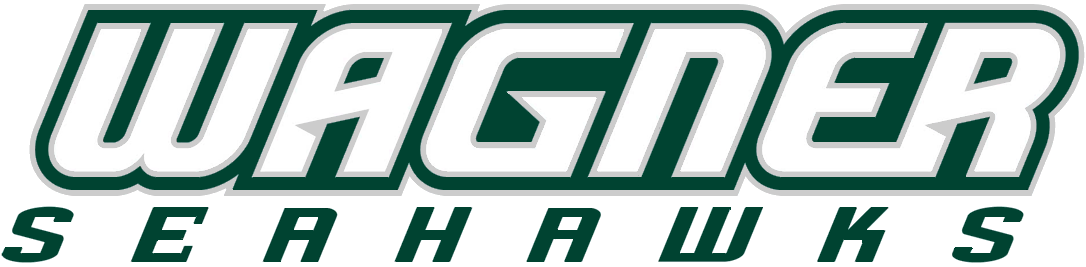

NEC regular season champions

NIT, Second Round
- Conference: Northeast Conference
- Record: 23–11 (13–5 NEC)
- Head coach: Bashir Mason (4th season)
- Associate head coach: Mike Babul
- Assistant coaches: Marquis Webb; Scott Smith
- Home arena: Spiro Sports Center

2015–16 Northeast Conference men's basketball standings
	Conf.				Overall
Team	W		L	PCT	W		L	PCT
Wagner	13	–	5	.722	23	–	11	.676
Fairleigh Dickinson †	11	–	7	.611	18	–	15	.545
Sacred Heart	11	–	7	.611	12	–	18	.400
St. Francis Brooklyn	11	–	7	.611	15	–	17	.469
Mount St. Mary's	10	–	8	.556	14	–	19	.424
LIU Brooklyn	9	–	9	.500	16	–	15	.516
Saint Francis	9	–	9	.500	13	–	17	.433
Robert Morris	8	–	10	.444	10	–	22	.313
Bryant	5	–	13	.278	8	–	23	.258
Central Connecticut	3	–	15	.167	4	–	25	.138
† 2016 NEC tournament winner

The 2015–16 Wagner Seahawks men's basketball team represented Wagner College during the 2015–16 NCAA Division I men's basketball season. The Seahawks were led by fourth year head coach Bashir Mason. They played their home games at Spiro Sports Center on the College's Staten Island campus and were members of the Northeast Conference. They finished the season 23–11, 13–5 in NEC play to win the regular season championship. They defeated Robert Morris and LIU Brooklyn to advance to the championship game of the NEC tournament where they lost to Fairleigh Dickinson. As a regular season conference champion who failed to win their conference tournament, they received an automatic bid to the National Invitation Tournament where they defeated St. Bonaventure in the first round before losing in the second round to Creighton.

== Roster ==
Official 2015–16 Wagner Roster

Number	Name	Position	Height	Weight	Year	Hometown
0	Corey Henson	Guard	6–3	175	Sophomore	Upper Marlboro, Maryland
1	Aaren Edmead	Guard	5–10	165	Sophomore	Deer Park, New York
2	Dwaun Anderson	Guard	6–4	200	Senior-RS	Suttons Bay, Michigan
3	Henry Brooks	Forward	6–8	215	Graduate	New Orleans, Louisiana
4	AJ Sumbry	Forward	6–8	227	Sophomore-RS	East Windsor, New Jersey
5	Jojo Cooper	Guard	6–1	190	Sophomore	Wilmington, Delaware
10	Marquis Salmon	Forward	6–7	210	Sophomore-RS	Lancaster, California
11	Romone Saunders	Guard	6–3	200	Sophomore	Temple Hills, Maryland
21	Japhet Kadji	Forward	6–7	205	Sophomore	Douala, Cameroon
23	Michael Carey	Guard	6–5	190	Junior	Nassau, Bahamas
24	Devin Liggeons	Guard	6–3	185	Freshman	Philadelphia, Pennsylvania
34	Mike Aaman	Forward	6–8	210	Senior-RS	Hazlet, New Jersey
35	Greg Senat	Guard	6–8	240	Junior	Elmont, New York

== Schedule ==
Date time, TV	Rank^{#}	Opponent^{#}	Result	Record	Site (attendance) city, state
Non-conference regular season
November 13, 2015*; 6:00 pm, FS1		at St. John's	L 57–66	0–1	Carnesecca Arena (4,677); Queens, NY
November 15, 2015*; 1:30 pm, FS1		at Seton Hall	L 59–69	0–2	Prudential Center (1,800); South Orange, NJ
November 21, 2015*; 2:00 pm		Maine	W 87–73	1–2	Spiro Sports Center (1,257); Staten Island, NY
November 28, 2015*; 4:00 pm		Staten Island	W 83–59	2–2	Spiro Sports Center (1,275); Staten Island, NY
December 2, 2015*; 7:30 pm		Morgan State	W 62–61	3–2	Spiro Sports Center (1,143); Staten Island, NY
December 6, 2015*; 2:00 pm		American	W 55–48	4–2	Spiro Sports Center (1,192); Staten Island, NY
December 8, 2015*; 7:00 pm		at Rider	W 65–64	5–2	Alumni Gymnasium (1,508); Lawrenceville, NJ
December 13, 2015*; 2:00 pm, ESPN3		at Monmouth	L 54–73	5–3	Multipurpose Activity Center (3,901); West Long Branch, NJ
December 18, 2015*; 7:00 pm		at Fairfield	W 76–64	6–3	Webster Bank Arena (843); Fairfield, CT
December 22, 2015*; 12:00 pm		at George Mason	L 60–71	6–4	EagleBank Arena (5,039); Fairfax, VA
December 30, 2015*; 7:00 pm		UMass Lowell	W 76–62	7–4	Spiro Sports Center; Staten Island, NY
NEC regular season
January 2, 2016; 4:00 pm		at Saint Francis (PA)	L 65–73	7–5 (0–1)	DeGol Arena (662); Loretto, PA
January 4, 2016; 7:30 pm		at Robert Morris	W 72–69	8–5 (1–1)	Charles L. Sewall Center (1,226); Moon Township, PA
January 7, 2016; 7:00 pm, CBSSN		Bryant	W 65–56	9–5 (2–1)	Spiro Sports Center (2,023); Staten Island, NY
January 9, 2016 pm		at Sacred Heart	W 76–59	10–5 (3–1)	William H. Pitt Center (355); Fairfield, CT
January 14, 2016; 7:00 pm		LIU Brooklyn	L 70–71	10–6 (3–2)	Spiro Sports Center (1,304); Staten Island, NY
January 16, 2016; 4:00 pm		Central Connecticut	W 70–48	11–6 (4–2)	Spiro Sports Center (1,632); Staten Island, NY
January 21, 2016; 7:00 pm		at St. Francis Brooklyn	W 83–59	12–6 (5–2)	Generoso Pope Athletic Complex (405); Brooklyn, NY
January 24, 2016; 4:00 pm		Sacred Heart; Postponed from 1/23/16	L 58–67	12–7 (5–3)	Spiro Sports Center (731); Staten Island, NY
January 28, 2016; 7:00 pm, MSG		St. Francis Brooklyn	W 64–61	13–7 (6–3)	Spiro Sports Center (1,708); Staten Island, NY
January 30, 2016; 3:00 pm		at Mount St. Mary's	W 73–63	14–7 (7–3)	Knott Arena (3,121); Emmitsburg, MD
February 4, 2016; 7:00 pm		Fairleigh Dickinson	L 79–82 ^{OT}	14–8 (7–4)	Spiro Sports Center (1,722); Staten Island, NY
February 6, 2016; 4:00 pm		Mount St. Mary's	W 72–51	15–8 (8–4)	Spiro Sports Center (2,082); Staten Island, NY
February 11, 2016; 7:00 pm		at LIU Brooklyn	L 69–82	15–9 (8–5)	Steinberg Wellness Center (1,475); Brooklyn, NY
February 13, 2016; 4:00 pm		at Bryant	W 79–55	16–9 (9–5)	Chace Athletic Center (427); Smithfield, RI
February 18, 2016; 7:00 pm		at Fairleigh Dickinson	W 94–74	17–9 (10–5)	Rothman Center (1,116); Teaneck, NJ
February 20, 2016; 3:30 pm, ESPN3		at Central Connecticut	W 83–57	18–9 (11–5)	William H. Detrick Gymnasium; New Britain, CT
February 25, 2016; 7:00 pm		Saint Francis (PA)	W 69–54	19–9 (12–5)	Spiro Sports Center (1,817); Staten Island, NY
February 27, 2016; 4:00 pm		Robert Morris	W 62–54	20–9 (13–5)	Spiro Sports Center (1,988); Staten Island, NY
Northeast Conference tournament
March 2, 2016; 7:00 pm	(1)	(8) Robert Morris; Quarterfinals	W 59–50	21–9	Spiro Sports Center (1,012); Staten Island, NY
March 5, 2016; 4:00 pm, MSG+, FCS	(1)	(6) LIU Brooklyn; Semifinals	W 81–65	22–9	Spiro Sports Center (1,814); Staten Island, NY
March 8, 2016; 7:00 pm, ESPN2	(1)	(2) Fairleigh Dickinson; Championship	L 79–87	22–10	Spiro Sports Center (2,358); Staten Island, NY
NIT
March 16, 2016*; 7:00 pm, ESPN3	(8)	at (1) St. Bonaventure; First Round – St. Bonaventure Bracket	W 79–75	23–10	Reilly Center (4,793); St. Bonaventure, NY
March 19, 2016*; 12:00 pm, ESPN	(8)	at (4) Creighton; Second Round – St. Bonaventure Bracket	L 54–87	23–11	CenturyLink Center Omaha (6,471); Omaha, NE
*Non-conference game. ^{#}Rankings from AP Poll. (#) Tournament seedings in parentheses. All times are in Eastern Time.
