= 2015–16 Robert Morris Colonials men's basketball team =

American college basketball season

2015–16 Robert Morris Colonials men's basketball
- Conference: Northeast Conference
- Record: 10–22 (8–10 NEC)
- Head coach: Andrew Toole (6th season)
- Assistant coaches: Joe Gallo; Robby Pridgen; Tim Lawrence
- Home arena: Charles L. Sewall Center

2015–16 Northeast Conference men's basketball standings
	Conf.				Overall
Team	W		L	PCT	W		L	PCT
Wagner	13	–	5	.722	23	–	11	.676
Fairleigh Dickinson †	11	–	7	.611	18	–	15	.545
Sacred Heart	11	–	7	.611	12	–	18	.400
St. Francis Brooklyn	11	–	7	.611	15	–	17	.469
Mount St. Mary's	10	–	8	.556	14	–	19	.424
LIU Brooklyn	9	–	9	.500	16	–	15	.516
Saint Francis	9	–	9	.500	13	–	17	.433
Robert Morris	8	–	10	.444	10	–	22	.313
Bryant	5	–	13	.278	8	–	23	.258
Central Connecticut	3	–	15	.167	4	–	25	.138
† 2016 NEC tournament winner

The 2015–16 Robert Morris Colonials men's basketball team represented Robert Morris University during the 2015–16 NCAA Division I men's basketball season. The Colonials, led by sixth year head coach Andrew Toole, played their home games at the Charles L. Sewall Center and were members of the Northeast Conference. They finished the season 10–22, 8–10 in NEC play to finish in eighth place. They lost in the quarterfinals of the NEC tournament to Wagner.

== Roster ==
Number	Name	Position	Height	Weight	Year	Hometown
1	Isaiah Still	Guard	6–6	190	Freshman	Rahway, New Jersey
2	Steven Whitley	Guard	6–4	210	Freshman	Norfolk, Virginia
3	Kavon Stewart	Guard	6–0	190	Junior	Paterson, New Jersey
4	Anthony Pugh	Guard	5–8	150	Freshman	Canfield, Ohio
5	Elijah Minnie	Forward	6–8	210	Sophomore	Monessen, Pennsylvania
10	Jordan Lester	Guard	6–2	195	Freshman	Sammamish, Washington
11	Rodney Pryor	Guard	6–5	205	Senior	Evanston, Illinois
12	Nate Johnson	Guard	5–11	170	Freshman	Linden, New Jersey
15	Joe Hugley	Forward	6–7	210	Freshman	Gaithersburg, Maryland
20	Billy Giles	Forward	6–7	200	Junior	Richmond, Virginia
23	Matty McConnell	Guard	6–2	195	Freshman	Oakdale, Pennsylvania
24	Aaron Tate	Forward	6–5	230	Senior	New Bern, North Carolina
25	Conrad Stephens	Forward	6–4	190	Junior	Columbus, Ohio
33	Andre Frederick	Forward	6–8	220	Sophomore	Detroit, Michigan
45	Stephan Bennett	Forward	6–9	215	Senior	Lake Station, Indiana

== Schedule ==
Date time, TV	Opponent	Result	Record	Site (attendance) city, state
Exhibition
November 3, 2015*; 7:00 pm	Saint Vincent	W 77–57	–	Charles L. Sewall Center (869); Moon Township, PA
Non-conference regular season
November 13, 2015*; 6:00 pm	at Penn	L 75–76	0–1	The Palestra (2,587); Philadelphia, PA
November 15, 2015*; 2:00 pm, ESPN3	at Cincinnati	L 44–106	0–2	Fifth Third Arena (6,292); Cincinnati, OH
November 18, 2015*; 7:00 pm	Bucknell	L 76–81	0–3	Charles L. Sewall Center (1,602); Moon Township, PA
November 22, 2015*; 4:00 pm	at Air Force; Air Force Classic	L 52–64	0–4	Clune Arena (983); Colorado Springs, CO
November 24, 2015*; 8:00 pm	at New Mexico State; Air Force Classic	L 71–81 ^{OT}	0–5	Pan American Center (4,115); Las Cruces, NM
November 27, 2015* pm	at Tennessee Tech; Air Force Classic	L 72–85	0–6	Eblen Center (760); Cookeville, TN
November 28, 2015* pm	vs. Mississippi Valley State; Air Force Classic	W 67–64	1–6	Eblen Center (755); Cookeville, TN
December 2, 2015*; 7:00 pm	at Youngstown State	L 58–65	1–7	Beeghly Center (1,497); Youngstown, OH
December 5, 2015*; 4:00 pm	Oakland	L 74–92	1–8	Charles L. Sewall Center (2,123); Moon Township, PA
December 14, 2015*; 2:00 pm	at Columbia	L 71–78	1–9	Levien Gymnasium (462); New York City, NY
December 17, 2015*; 7:00 pm	Lehigh	W 69–67	2–9	Charles L. Sewall Center (651); Moon Township, PA
December 19, 2015*; 2:00 pm	at Duquesne	L 65–72	2–10	Palumbo Center (2,119); Pittsburgh, PA
December 29, 2015*; 7:00 pm, SECN	at Georgia	L 67–79	2–11	Stegeman Coliseum (6,458); Athens, GA
NEC regular season
January 2, 2016; 4:00 pm	Sacred Heart	L 65–69	2–12 (0–1)	Charles L. Sewall Center (1,334); Moon Township, PA
January 4, 2016; 7:30 pm	Wagner	L 69–72	2–13 (0–2)	Charles L. Sewall Center (1,226); Moon Township, PA
January 7, 2016; 7:00 pm	at LIU Brooklyn	W 70–60	3–13 (1–2)	Steinberg Wellness Center (1,003); Brooklyn, NY
January 9, 2016; 4:00 pm	at St. Francis Brooklyn	L 49–56	3–14 (1–3)	Generoso Pope Athletic Complex (375); Brooklyn, NY
January 14, 2016; 7:00 pm	Mount St. Mary's	L 52–76	3–15 (1–4)	Charles L. Sewall Center (1,547); Moon Township, PA
January 16, 2016; 4:00 pm	Fairleigh Dickinson	W 64–58	4–15 (2–4)	Charles L. Sewall Center (1,678); Moon Township, PA
January 21, 2016; 7:00 pm	at Central Connecticut	W 59–45	5–15 (3–4)	William H. Detrick Gymnasium (1,017); New Britain, CT
January 23, 2016; 4:00 pm, ESPN3	at Bryant	W 65–54	6–15 (4–4)	Chace Athletic Center (323); Smithfield, RI
January 28, 2016; 7:00 pm, CBSSN	at Mount St. Mary's	L 49–70	6–16 (4–5)	Knott Arena (2,421); Emmitsburg, MD
January 30, 2016 pm	at Saint Francis (PA)	L 78–90	6–17 (4–6)	DeGol Arena (1,723); Loretto, PA
February 4, 2016; 7:00 pm	Central Connecticut	L 60–65	6–18 (4–7)	Charles L. Sewall Center (1,615); Moon Township, PA
February 6, 2016; 4:00 pm	Bryant	W 89–71	7–18 (5–7)	Charles L. Sewall Center (1,709); Moon Township, PA
February 11, 2016; 7:00 pm, ESPNU	Saint Francis (PA)	L 57–68	7–19 (5–8)	Charles L. Sewall Center (1,591); Moon Township, PA
February 13, 2016; 4:30 pm, RTPT/MSG	at Fairleigh Dickinson	W 72–70	8–19 (6–8)	Rothman Center (1,411); Hackensack, NJ
February 18, 2016; 7:00 pm	LIU Brooklyn	W 74–67	9–19 (7–8)	Charles L. Sewall Center (952); Moon Township, PA
February 20, 2016; 4:00 pm	St. Francis Brooklyn	L 72–82	9–20 (7–9)	Charles L. Sewall Center (2,284); Moon Township, PA
February 25, 2016; 7:00 pm	at Sacred Heart	W 73–63	10–20 (8–9)	William H. Pitt Center (312); Fairfield, CT
February 27, 2016; 4:00 pm	at Wagner	L 54–62	10–21 (8–10)	Spiro Sports Center (1,988); Staten Island, NY
Northeast Conference tournament
March 2, 2016; 7:00 pm	at Wagner; Quarterfinals	L 50–59	10–22	Spiro Sports Center (1,012); Staten Island, NY
*Non-conference game. ^{#}Rankings from AP Poll. (#) Tournament seedings in parentheses. All times are in Eastern Time..
