= Earl Potts Jr. =

American basketball player (born 1995)

Personal information
- Born: June 26, 1995 (age 31)
- Listed height: 6 ft 6 in (1.98 m)
- Listed weight: 200 lb (91 kg)

Career information
- High school: Archbishop Spalding (Severn, Maryland); Coastal Academy (Belmar, New Jersey)
- College: Fairleigh Dickinson (2013–2017)
- NBA draft: 2017: undrafted
- Playing career: 2017–present
- Position: Shooting guard / small forward

Career highlights
- Second-team All-NEC (2016); NEC Most Improved Player (2016)

Earl Potts Jr. (born June 26, 1995) is an American basketball player. He played college basketball for Fairleigh Dickinson University of the Northeast Conference (NEC). He is a 6 ft 6 in (1.98 m) swingman.

== High school career ==
Potts played his first four seasons of high school basketball with Archbishop Spalding High School in his hometown of Severn, Maryland. He joined the varsity team after being called up midway through his freshman season. As a junior, he averaged 15 points and eight rebounds and earned second-team All-Baltimore Catholic League (BCL) honors. The league's coaches also voted him as the Cokey Robertson Most Improved Player that season.

In his senior year, Potts averaged 17.8 points, 10.9 rebounds, and 2.4 blocks per game. One of his top performances was 36 points and 12 rebounds in a win over The John Carroll School. Potts was named Capital Gazette Communications Boys Basketball Player of the Year and garnering first-team All-County and first-team All-League recognition. He led Spalding to the BCL title game as the fifth-seed and a 22–12 record. In the A Conference playoffs, Potts pushed his team past St. Maria Goretti High School in the quarterfinals by making a game-tying jumper with one second remaining in regulation. Spalding finished in third place at the tournament. In his years at the school, Potts was also a member of the varsity baseball team for three seasons.

Following Spalding, Potts was ruled ineligible to play in the National Collegiate Athletic Association (NCAA) because he failed to meet the qualifying standards. As a result, he chose to play one year of basketball at prep school. Potts eventually played for Coastal Academy in Belmar, New Jersey. After the season came to a close, he was averaging 20 points and 10.5 rebounds, with one outstanding game being 27 points and 11 rebounds. Potts was also named to the National Prep School Invitational All-Tournament Team in 2014, making him a more attractive recruit to colleges. He described his growth at Coastal Academy, saying, "When I was in high school, I was mainly just a slasher. I could shoot a little bit, but it really improved at prep school." During the offseason, Potts competed with the Cecil Kirk team in the Amateur Athletic Union (AAU).

== Collegiate career ==
Potts drew recruiting attention from Delaware State, but he chose to play with Fairleigh Dickinson University instead. He signed a National Letter of Intent with the Knights and chose the school because he was interested in fashion and wanted to major in business. Fairleigh Dickinson head coach, Greg Herenda, commented on the pickup, "Earl is not only an incredible athlete, but he is very skilled and will add another dimension to our frontcourt."

As a freshman, Potts had a quiet season, averaging 6.6 points and 2.9 rebounds in 18.1 minutes per game. He scored a season-high 22 points and added six rebounds in a loss to Robert Morris on February 7, 2015.

In his sophomore season, Potts saw his role with the Knights grow immensely. He notched his first double-double in a win over Fairleigh Dickinson–Florham of the NCAA Division III, adding 14 points and 11 rebounds. On December 12, 2015, he recorded a career-high 29 points against Temple, with four three-pointers. However, his team lost the game, 70-79. Potts said, "I would give all of those points back to have won that game. All I was trying to do was win and give the team whatever it needed." Potts scored 22 points and grabbed 11 rebounds in an overtime victory over Wagner on February 5. He made two consecutive three-pointers to help the Knights capture the win, with the final shot coming from the corner with 1.3 seconds left in overtime. On March 8, 2016, in a rematch with Wagner at the 2016 Northeast Conference men's basketball tournament, Potts contributed 27 points and 7 rebounds to help Fairleigh Dickinson win the championship and qualify for that year's NCAA Tournament. He was named the tournament's Most Valuable Player.

== Professional career ==
=== Raptors 905 (since 2017) ===
On October 5, 2017, Potts was signed by Raptors 905, however, he did not make the final roster.
