= Quincy McKnight =

American basketball player (born 1995)

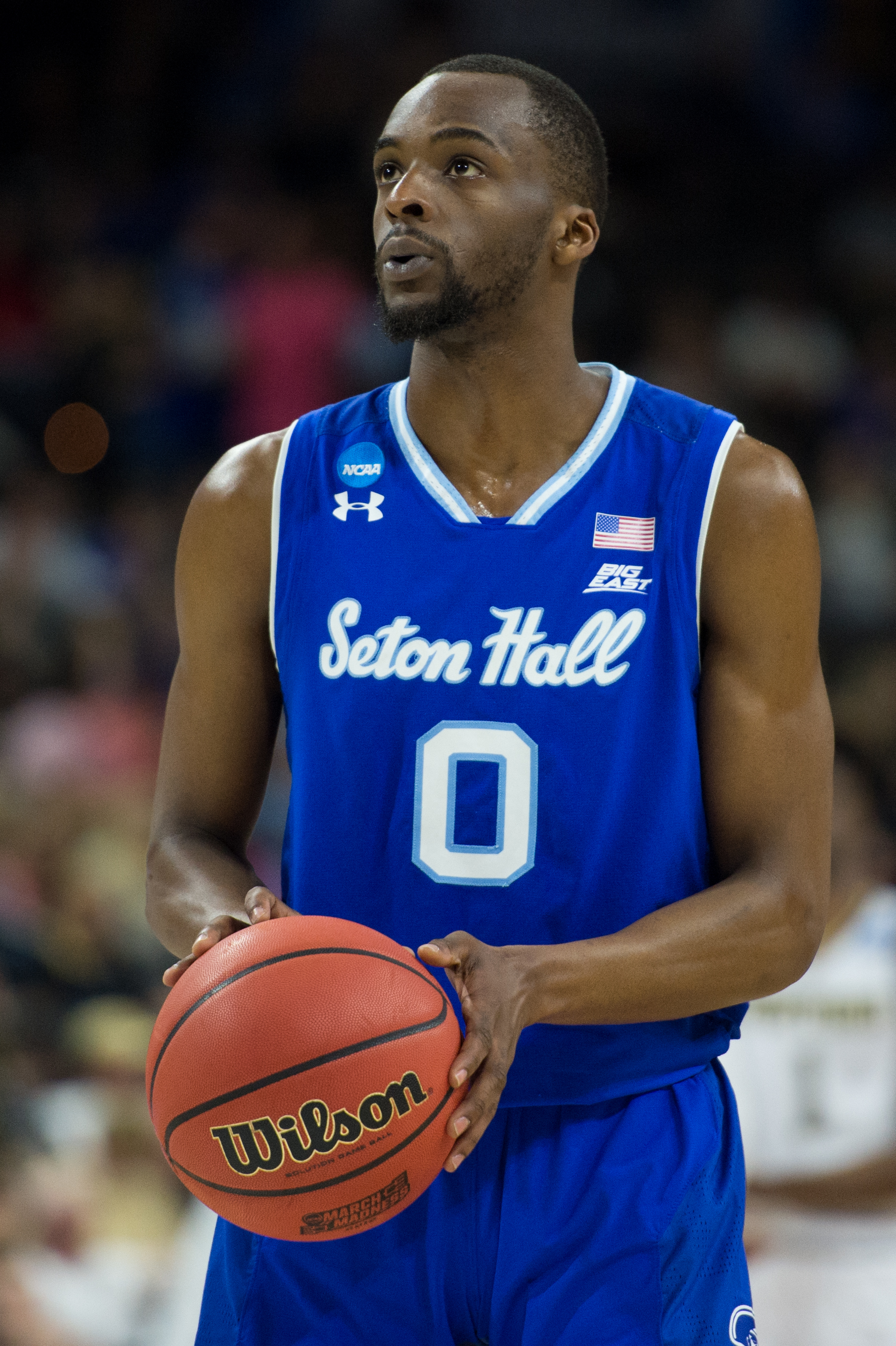
- McKnight with the Seton Hall Pirates in 2019

Personal information
- Born: December 5, 1995 (age 30) Bridgeport, Connecticut, US
- Listed height: 6 ft 4 in (1.93 m)
- Listed weight: 185 lb (84 kg)

Career information
- High school: St. Joseph (Trumbull, Connecticut); The Phelps School (Malvern, Pennsylvania)
- College: Sacred Heart (2015–2017); Seton Hall (2018–2020)
- NBA draft: 2020: undrafted
- Playing career: 2021–2022
- Position: Shooting guard

Career history
- 2021: Fort Wayne Mad Ants
- 2021–2022: Široki

Career highlights
- First-team All-NEC (2017)

Quincy McKnight (born December 5, 1995) is an American former professional basketball player. He played college basketball for the Sacred Heart Pioneers and the Seton Hall Pirates. He grew up in Bridgeport, Connecticut and attended St. Joseph High School before transferring to The Phelps School. McKnight played two seasons at Sacred Heart, where he was named to the First Team All-Northeast Conference, before transferring to Seton Hall. He was named Honorable Mention All-Big East after leading the team to a share of the league championship during his senior season.

== Early life ==
McKnight was born and raised in Bridgeport, Connecticut. He is the son of Vanessa Bruce and Terry McKnight. Shortly after he won a diocesan championship at 13 years old, his mother was diagnosed with cancer. She died several weeks later. Quincy used her death as motivation to become better at basketball.

McKnight began his high school career at St. Joseph High School in Trumbull, Connecticut, and led the team to back-to-back state championships. As a junior, he averaged 22 points per game, but he injured his knee in the spring. He transferred to The Phelps School where he competed in basketball and tennis. McKnight was an honor roll performer academically at The Phelps School and was coached in basketball by Brian Shanahan. In Amateur Athletic Union (AAU) play, he competed for the PSA Cardinals in the Peach Jam tournament. As a senior at The Phelps School, he averaged 15.9 points, 4.2 rebounds, and 3.5 assists per game and was selected to play in the 2015 Jordan Brand Classic Regional Game. He led the team to the 2015 state championship. McKnight was lightly recruited, being regarded as a two-star prospect ranked no. 341 in his class by 247 Sports. He committed to play college basketball for Sacred Heart.

== College career ==
As a freshman, McKnight averaged 11.4 points and 5.3 rebounds per game. He was a five-time Northeast Conference rookie of the week honoree and was named to the league All-Rookie team. McKnight scored a career-high 44 points in a triple-overtime win against Bryant during his sophomore season. He also posted 36 points in a loss to Boston College and scored at least 25 points in 10 games. He was named Northeast Conference player of the week on three occasions. As a sophomore, McKnight averaged 18.9 points, 4.9 rebounds and 3.0 assists per game. He was named to the First Team All-Northeast Conference. After the season, he announced his intention to transfer. McKnight scored 914 points in two seasons at Sacred Heart.

After impressing in an open gym workout, McKnight transferred to Seton Hall and was offered a scholarship on the spot. McKnight redshirted the 2017–18 season, during which he engaged in fierce practices against Khadeen Carrington, whom he credited with making him a better player. McKnight forged a special relationship with Myles Powell during a summer class in 2017. During his junior season, McKnight emerged as a lockdown defender and secondary scorer to Powell. He averaged 9.4 points, 3.9 assists, and 1.6 steals per game. On December 19, 2019, McKnight scored 17 points and had eight rebounds and six assists, including two free throws with 1.1 seconds on the clock, in an upset win against Maryland without the injured Powell and Sandro Mamukelashvili. The following game, McKnight scored a season-high 25 points in a win against Prairie View A&M. On February 3, 2020, he scored 15 points in a 74–62 loss to Xavier but injured his knee late in the game and was listed as day-to-day. An MRI revealed a muscle sprain, and he returned for the following game against Georgetown. As a senior, McKnight averaged 11.9 points, 5.4 assists, and 1.5 steals per game. He led the Big East Conference in assists and was named Honorable Mention All-Big East after leading the team to a share of the league championship. McKnight tallied 295 assists in two years at Seton Hall, placing himself in the school's top-20 despite playing 64 games for the Pirates.

== Professional career ==
In January 2021, McKnight was selected with the seventh pick in the second round of the NBA G League Draft by the Fort Wayne Mad Ants. He played sparingly and averaged 0.8 points, 1.7 rebounds, and 2.2 assists per game. On December 5, 2021, McKnight signed with Široki of the Bosnian Championship. He parted ways with the team on January 13, 2022.

On October 24, 2022, McKnight rejoined the Fort Wayne Mad Ants roster for training camp. However, he did not make the final roster.

== Career statistics ==
Legend
GP	Games played	GS	Games started	MPG	Minutes per game
FG%	Field goal percentage	3P%	3-point field goal percentage	FT%	Free throw percentage
RPG	Rebounds per game	APG	Assists per game	SPG	Steals per game
BPG	Blocks per game	PPG	Points per game	**Bold**	Career high

=== College ===
Year	Team	GP	GS	MPG	FG%	3P%	FT%	RPG	APG	SPG	BPG	PPG
2015–16	Sacred Heart	27	27	32.1	.433	.250	.565	**5.3**	2.5	**1.6**	**.4**	11.4
2016–17	Sacred Heart	32	31	**32.5**	.429	.321	.775	4.9	3.0	**1.6**	.2	**18.9**
2017–18	Seton Hall	Redshirt										
2018–19	Seton Hall	**34**	**33**	28.5	**.452**	.269	.641	2.7	3.9	**1.6**	.2	9.4
2019–20	Seton Hall	30	30	30.7	.414	**.346**	**.850**	3.3	**5.4**	1.5	.2	11.9
Career		123	121	30.9	.431	.308	.725	4.0	3.7	1.6	.2	12.9
