= Cane Broome =

American basketball player (born 1994)

St. Thomas More Chancellors
- Title: Coach
- League: NEPSAC

Personal information
- Born: November 29, 1994 (age 31) Hartford, Connecticut, U.S.
- Listed height: 6 ft 0 in (1.83 m)
- Listed weight: 160 lb (73 kg)

Career information
- High school: St. Thomas More (Oakdale, Connecticut)
- College: Sacred Heart (2014–2016); Cincinnati (2017–2019)
- NBA draft: 2019: undrafted
- Playing career: 2019–2020
- Position: Point guard
- Number: 15
- Coaching career: 2021–present

Career history

Playing
- 2019–2020: St. John's Edge

Coaching
- 2021–2023: St. Thomas More (assistant)
- 2023–present: St. Thomas More

Career highlights
- NBLC All-Rookie Team (2020); AP Honorable Mention All-American (2016); NEC Player of the Year (2016); First-team All-NEC (2016)

Cane Broome (born November 29, 1994) is an American high school basketball coach who was formerly a professional basketball player for the St. John's Edge of the National Basketball League of Canada. He played college basketball for the Sacred Heart Pioneers and the Cincinnati Bearcats. At Sacred Heart, Broome was named the 2016 Northeast Conference Player of the Year.

== College career ==
Broome was named Northeast Conference Player of the Week three times as a sophomore. On February 20, 2016, he became the only player since the 2010–11 season with least 39 points, six rebounds, and six assists without turning the ball over. Broome was named Northeast Conference Men's Basketball Player of the Year in his sophomore season at Sacred Heart, just the second sophomore to do so. On the season, he averaged 23.1 points and 4.9 rebounds per game.

Broome announced in April 2016 that he would transfer to Cincinnati and sit out a season. It was an adjustment, as Broome was used to being the star but had to become a role player. As a junior, he scored in double figures seven times. Broome averaged 7.9 points per game as a junior on a 31–5 Cincinnati team that earned a 2 seed in the NCAA Tournament. As a senior, he averaged 8.3 points and 2.2 assists per game. He considers his 16-point, five-assist performance in a loss to Xavier on December 2 to be his best game.

== Professional career ==
Broome signed with the St. John's Edge of the National Basketball League of Canada on October 11, 2019. On February 18, 2020, Broome was named National Basketball League of Canada player of the week after averaging 22.5 points per game in two victories. He averaged 13.9 points and 2.1 rebounds per game, earning league All-Rookie Team honors.

After the Edge folded in 2021, Broome became an assistant basketball coach at his high school alma mater, St. Thomas More School in Oakdale, Connecticut, where he also serves as a school nurse.

== Career statistics ==
Legend
GP	Games played	GS	Games started	MPG	Minutes per game
FG%	Field goal percentage	3P%	3-point field goal percentage	FT%	Free throw percentage
RPG	Rebounds per game	APG	Assists per game	SPG	Steals per game
BPG	Blocks per game	PPG	Points per game	**Bold**	Career high

=== College ===
Year	Team	GP	GS	MPG	FG%	3P%	FT%	RPG	APG	SPG	BPG	PPG
2014–15	Sacred Heart	32	**30**	31.6	.445	.338	.752	3.8	2.4	1.1	**.2**	14.5
2015–16	Sacred Heart	30	**30**	**37.5**	.445	.311	**.768**	**4.9**	**2.9**	**1.7**	.0	**23.1**
2016–17	Cincinnati	Redshirt										
2017–18	Cincinnati	34	3	20.5	**.463**	**.390**	.708	1.5	2.8	.9	.1	7.9
2018–19	Cincinnati	**35**	4	21.2	.396	.287	.750	1.7	2.2	.6	.0	8.3
Career		131	67	27.3	.439	.326	.753	2.9	2.6	1.1	.1	13.1
