= Greg Herenda =

American basketball player and coach

Biographical details
- Born: April 2, 1961 (age 65); North Bergen, New Jersey, U.S.

Playing career
- 1980–1983: Merrimack College

Coaching career (HC unless noted)
- 1985–1989: Merrimack (asst.)
- 1989–1994: Holy Cross (asst.)
- 1994–1997: Seton Hall (asst.)
- 1997–1999: Yale (asst.)
- 1999–2005: East Carolina (asst.)
- 2006–2007: Elgin CC
- 2007–2008: Cabrini
- 2008–2013: UMass Lowell
- 2013–2022: Fairleigh Dickinson
- 2022–2025: Elon (asst.)

Head coaching record
- Overall: 230–243 (.486)
- Tournaments: 1–2 (NCAA Division I); 0–4 (NCAA Division II)

Accomplishments and honors

Championships
- NE-10 tournament (2010); NEC regular season (2019); 2 NEC tournament (2016, 2019)

Awards
- NABC District 18 Coach of the Year (2016)

Greg Herenda (born April 2, 1961) is an American basketball coach and former player. He was most recently an assistant coach at Elon. He is the former head coach of the Fairleigh Dickinson Knights men's basketball team. and previously served as the head coach at UMass Lowell.

== Biography ==
Herenda grew up in North Bergen, New Jersey and played high school basketball at St. Peter's Preparatory School.

=== Coaching career ===
After playing at Merrimack College, where he set the single game record for assists in a game with 22, Herenda joined the Warriors coaching staff, where he stayed for four seasons before joining the staff at Holy Cross. He also had stints as an assistant with Seton Hall, Yale, and East Carolina before landing his first head coaching job at Elgin Community College in 2006–07.

In his one and only season with ECC, Herenda guided the team to an 18–11 record, helping the squad reach the Region IV District B Junior College Championship game for the first time in school history. After a one-year stop as the head coach of Division III Cabrini College, Herenda was hired at UMass Lowell, where he led the team to a 21–8 record and second-place finish in the Northeast-10 Conference. It sparked a run of four-straight appearances in the NCAA Men's Division II Basketball Championship, averaging 19 wins per season in his first five years at the helm.

On April 24, 2013, Herenda accepted the head coaching job at Fairleigh Dickinson, replacing Greg Vetrone. In his third year with Fairleigh Dickinson, Herenda coached a team that started no upperclassmen, (four sophomores and one freshman) to the school's first Northeast Conference Championship since 2005. This coaching performance earned him NABC District 18 Coach of the Year honors. Herenda and Fairleigh Dickinson parted ways following the 2021-22 season, in which the team went 4-22.

== Head coaching record ==
=== College ===
Record table
Season	Team	Overall	Conference	Standing	Postseason
Elgin C.C. Spartans (Illinois Skyway Conference) (2006–2007)
2006–07	Elgin CC	18–11	N/A	N/A	
Elgin CC:		18–11 (.621)	N/A		
Cabrini College Cavaliers (Colonial States Athletic Conference) (2007–2008)
2007–08	Cabrini	12–14	N/A	N/A	
Cabrini:		12–14 (.462)	N/A		
UMass Lowell River Hawks (Northeast-10 Conference) (2008–2013)
2008–09	UMass Lowell	21–8	16–6	2nd	NCAA Division II Round of 64
2009–10	UMass Lowell	20–12	13–9	7th	NCAA Division II Round of 64
2010–11	UMass Lowell	20–10	14–8	6th	NCAA Division II Round of 64
2011–12	UMass Lowell	19–11	13–9	4th	NCAA Division II Round of 64
2012–13	UMass Lowell	15–13	10–12	8th	
UMass Lowell:		95–54 (.638)	66–44 (.600)		
Fairleigh Dickinson Knights (Northeast Conference) (2013–2022)
2013–14	Fairleigh Dickinson	10–21	6–10	8th	
2014–15	Fairleigh Dickinson	8–21	3–15	T–9th	
2015–16	Fairleigh Dickinson	18–15	11–7	T–2nd	NCAA Division I First Four
2016–17	Fairleigh Dickinson	11–19	9–9	T–5th	
2017–18	Fairleigh Dickinson	13–18	9–9	T–6th	
2018–19	Fairleigh Dickinson	21–14	12–6	T–1st	NCAA Division I Round of 64
2019–20	Fairleigh Dickinson	11–19	9–9	T–5th	
2020–21	Fairleigh Dickinson	9–15	8–10	8th	
2021–22	Fairleigh Dickinson	4–22	5–13	T–8th	
Fairleigh Dickinson:		105–164 (.390)	72–88 (.450)		
Total:		230–243 (.486)			
National champion Postseason invitational champion Conference regular season champion Conference regular season and conference tournament champion Division regular season champion Division regular season and conference tournament champion Conference tournament champion
