= Spiro Sports Center =

Sports arena in Staten Island, New York

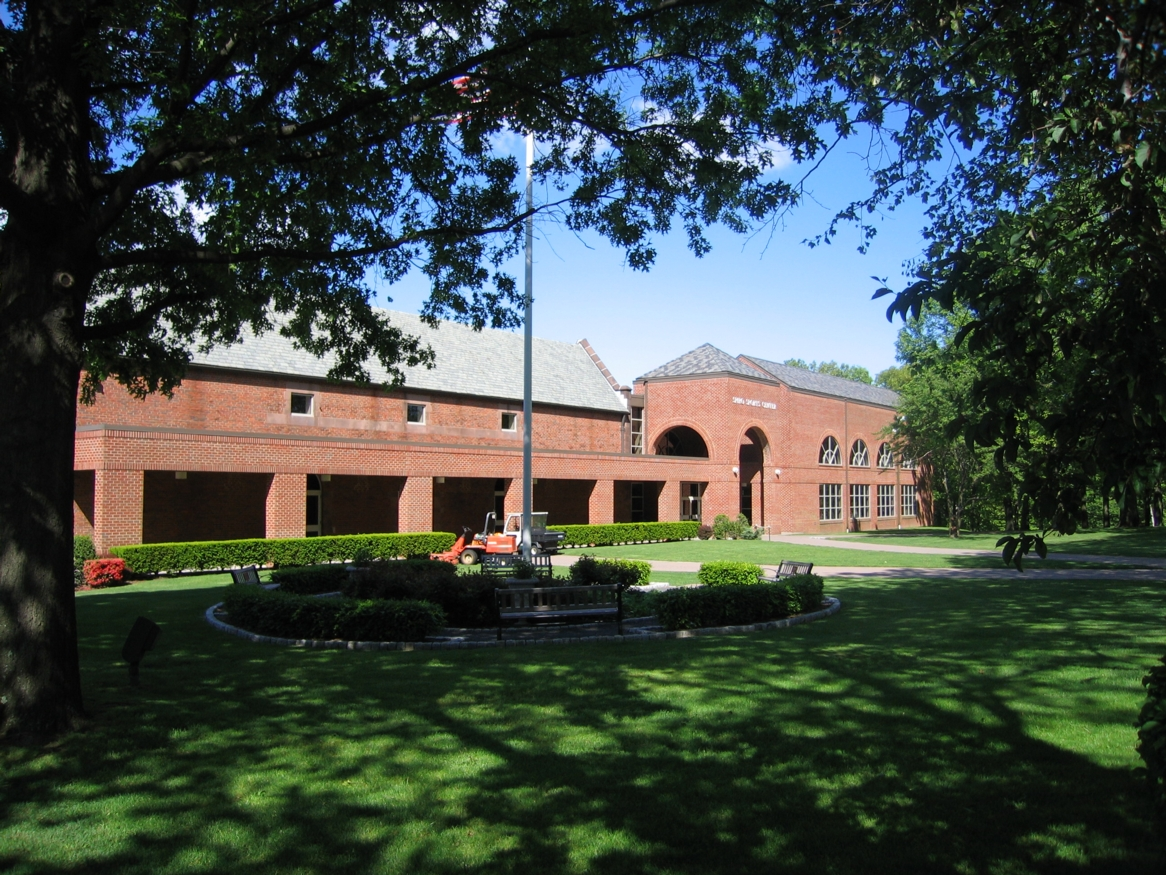
- Exterior of Spiro Sports Center
- Interactive map of Spiro Sports Center
- Location: Campus Rd Staten Island, New York 10301
- Coordinates: 40.6149664°N 74.095729°W
- Owner: Wagner College
- Capacity: 2,100
- Record attendance: 2,358 (March 8, 2016 vs. Fairleigh Dickinson Knights men's basketball)

Construction
- Opened: 1999

Tenants
- Wagner Seahawks men's basketball and Wagner Seahawks women's basketball

Spiro Sports Center is a 2,100-seat multi-purpose arena located on the campus of Wagner College in Staten Island, New York. It was built in 1999 as an extensive addition to the Sutter Gymnasium, which was constructed in 1951. The center is home to the Wagner College Seahawks men's and women's basketball team. The Northeast Conference men's basketball tournament was held there in 1999, 2003, 2016, and 2018.

The center also houses a pool, numerous locker rooms, fitness center/weight room, training room, equipment room, as well as offices and meeting rooms for Wagner's intercollegiate athletic programs.

== See also ==
- List of NCAA Division I basketball arenas
