= Bogota Savings Bank Center =

Sports venue in Hackensack, New Jersey, United States

- Interactive map of Bogota Savings Bank Center
- Former names: Rothman Center
- Location: Fairleigh Dickinson University, 1000 River Road; Hackensack, NJ 07601
- Coordinates: 40.8967°N 74.0324°W
- Owner: Fairleigh Dickinson University
- Operator: Fairleigh Dickinson University
- Capacity: 1,852
- Surface: Hardwood

Construction
- Groundbreaking: September 9, 1985
- Opened: September 9, 1987
- Cost: $1,000,000

Tenants
- Fairleigh Dickinson Knights men's basketball Fairleigh Dickinson Knights women's basketball

The Bogota Savings Bank Center is a multi-purpose arena in Hackensack, New Jersey. Home to the Fairleigh Dickinson University Knights men's and women's basketball, volleyball, track and field teams, as well as many other sports, it was completed in 1987 and seats 1,852.

Originally called the Rothman Center, named for Mr. and Mrs. George Rothman, generous benefactors to the university, the arena's name was changed on January 18, 2024.

The center hosted the Northeast Conference men's basketball tournament final in the 2004–05 and 2005-06 seasons. The center also hosts various trade shows and special events ranging from doll shows and toy soldier shows to visits by Vice President George H. W. Bush in 1988 & former President Bill Clinton as well as former Vice President Al Gore. On October 21, 2009 the Rothman Center was visited by President Barack Obama. President Obama visited the Rothman Center to rally for former Governor of New Jersey Jon S. Corzine.

The Northeast Conference men's basketball tournament was held there three times.

== See also ==
- List of NCAA Division I basketball arenas
