= 2015–16 St. Francis Brooklyn Terriers men's basketball team =

American college basketball season

2015–16 St. Francis Brooklyn Terriers men's basketball
- Conference: Northeast Conference
- Record: 15–17 (11–7 NEC)
- Head coach: Glenn Braica (6th season)
- Assistant coaches: Clive Bentick (9th season); Ron Ganulin (3rd season); Jamaal Womack (3rd season)
- Home arena: Generoso Pope Athletic Complex

2015–16 Northeast Conference men's basketball standings
| | Conf. | | | | Overall |
| Team | W | | L | PCT | W | | L | PCT |
|---|---|---|---|---|---|---|---|---|
| Wagner | 13 | – | 5 | .722 | 23 | – | 11 | .676 |
| Fairleigh Dickinson † | 11 | – | 7 | .611 | 18 | – | 15 | .545 |
| Sacred Heart | 11 | – | 7 | .611 | 12 | – | 18 | .400 |
| St. Francis Brooklyn | 11 | – | 7 | .611 | 15 | – | 17 | .469 |
| Mount St. Mary's | 10 | – | 8 | .556 | 14 | – | 19 | .424 |
| LIU Brooklyn | 9 | – | 9 | .500 | 16 | – | 15 | .516 |
| Saint Francis | 9 | – | 9 | .500 | 13 | – | 17 | .433 |
| Robert Morris | 8 | – | 10 | .444 | 10 | – | 22 | .313 |
| Bryant | 5 | – | 13 | .278 | 8 | – | 23 | .258 |
| Central Connecticut | 3 | – | 15 | .167 | 4 | – | 25 | .138 |
† 2016 NEC tournament winner

The 2015–16 St. Francis Brooklyn Terriers men's basketball team represented St. Francis College during the 2015–16 NCAA Division I men's basketball season. The Terrier's home games were played at the Generoso Pope Athletic Complex. The team has been a member of the Northeast Conference since 1981. They were coached by Glenn Braica who was in his sixth year at the helm of the Terriers. They finished the season 15–17, 11–7 in NEC play to finish in a three-way tie for second place. They lost in the quarterfinals of the NEC tournament to Mount St. Mary's.

== Preseason ==
The Terriers lost 4 players to graduation; point guard Brent Jones, forward Lowell Ulmer, swingman Kevin Douglas and forward Jalen Cannon. The biggest losses being Cannon and Jones, both of which led the team is various statistical categories last year and broke several program and conference records.

As of May the Terriers have added 3 players to their roster; Dagur Kár Jónsson, Jagos Lasic and Joshua Nurse.

- Jónsson, averaged 17.3 points and 3.5 assists per game this past season for Stjarnan in Iceland's Premier Club League, where he was voted as one of the elite five players for the first half of the season. This summer he will play with the Icelandic national under-20 basketball team.
- Lasic is a 6'8" Junior College transfer from the New Mexico Military Institute didn't play much. Yet, as a senior at Morgan County High School in West Liberty Kentucky, he averaged 21 points and 15 rebounds per game and was selected to play in the Kentucky-Ohio All-Star Game.
- Nurse is a 6'9" forward from the Queens High School of Teaching. In his senior season, he averaged almost 11 points and 16.0 rebounds during the PSAL regular season, upping his scoring to almost 14 ppg. during the PSAL playoffs.

St. Francis will also have Keon Williams, Marlin Alcindor and Jonathan Doss join their active roster. All three players were redshirts last year. In addition, the Terriers will have a senior walk-on Miles Rockafeler who played his final year of high school at powerhouse St. Anthony's (NJ).

=== Departures ===
| Name | Number | Pos. | Height | Weight | Year | Hometown | Notes |
|---|---|---|---|---|---|---|---|
| Jalen Cannon | 5 | F | 6'6" | 230 | Senior | Allentown, Pennsylvania | Graduated, went on to play professionally for the Jefes de Fuerza Lagunera |
| Brent Jones | 1 | G | 5'10" | 170 | Senior | Bronx, New York | Graduated |
| Lowell Ulmer | 23 | F | 6'5" | 210 | Senior | Staten Island, New York | Graduated |
| Kevin Douglas | 34 | F | 6'5" | 210 | Senior | Bronx, New York | Graduated |

=== Incoming transfers ===
| Name | Number | Pos. | Height | Weight | Year | Hometown | Previous School |
|---|---|---|---|---|---|---|---|
| Jagos Lasic | 33 | SF | 6'8" | 185 | Sophomore (RS) | Belgrade, Serbia | Junior college transfer from New Mexico Military Institute |

=== Class of 2015 signees ===
College recruiting
| Name | Hometown | School | Height | Weight | Commit date |
|---|---|---|---|---|---|
| Joshua Nurse; PF | Laurelton, NY | Queens High School of Teaching | 6 ft 9 in (2.06 m) | 195 lb (88 kg) | Nov 8, 2014 |
| Joshua Nurse; PF | Recruit ratings: No ratings found | | | | |
| Dagur Kár Jónsson; PG | Reykjanesbær, Iceland | Fjölbrautaskólinn í Breiðholti | 6 ft 1 in (1.85 m) | 165 lb (75 kg) | |
| Dagur Kár Jónsson; PG | Recruit ratings: No ratings found | | | | |
Overall recruit ranking:
Note: In many cases, Scout, Rivals, 247Sports, On3, and ESPN may conflict in their listings of height and weight.; In these cases, the average was taken. ESPN grades are on a 100-point scale.; Sources: "2015 St. Francis Brooklyn Signees". Rivals.; "2015 St. Francis Brooklyn Signees". Scout.; "2015 St. Francis Brooklyn Signees". ESPN.; "Scout.com Team Recruiting Rankings". Scout.; "2015 Team Ranking". Rivals.; "2015 St. Francis Brooklyn Signees". 247Sports.

=== Season outlook ===
In Glenn Braica's first five seasons, the Terriers have made the NEC tournament each year. Going into this season Braica has a combined 83–74 overall record and 54–34 conference record. Last year the Terriers won the Regular Season Championship, participated in the NEC Tournament Championship game and participated in the 2015 NIT. The Terriers, however were selected to finish 5th in 2015–16 NEC Men's Basketball Preseason Coaches Poll.

== Regular season ==
=== Non-conference games ===
==== November ====
The Terriers opened their schedule on the road against Boston College, a 49–75 loss in which the Terriers never led. St. Francis Brooklyn missed their first 13 field goal attempts and shot 27.9% (17-of-61) for the game, the one bright spot being freshman guard Dagur Kár Jónsson who came off the bench to score 12 points, grab 5 rebounds, and dish out 2 assists. In their second game, the Terriers defeated Mount St. Vincent, a D-III program, 93–67 at home on 50% (30-of-60) overall shooting. The Terriers were led by Yunus Hopkinson's career-high 25 points and contributions from Glenn Sanabria (14 Pts, 1 Reb, 2 Ast, 3 Stl) and Jonathan Doss (13 Pts, 9 Reb, 2 Ast, 1 Stl, 1 Blk). As part of the Brooklyn Hoops Classic, the Terriers headed to St. Louis, Missouri to face the Billikens for the first time in their history. The Terriers lost 60–76 in a tightly contested game where the Terriers were down by just 4 points with 4 minutes to play; they were led by Tyreek Jewell (12 Pts, 6 Reb, 5 Ast, 1 Stl). The Terriers continued their Brooklyn Hoops Classic games and traveled to Louisville, Kentucky to face the Cardinals where they lost 41–85. The Terriers were led by Glenn Sanabria (11 Pts, 1 Reb, 2 Ast) and Tyreek Jewell (11 Pts, 2 Reb, 1 Blk) in the losing effort. The 44-point differential is the team's largest loss margin of the season. The next two games against Hartford and North Florida, as part of the Brooklyn Hoops Classic, will be played at Hartford, while Saint Louis and Louisville face-off at the Barclays Center. The Terriers lost against North Florida 65–78 to extend their losing streak to 3 games. They were led by Amdy Fall (13 Pts, 10 Reb, 1 Ast, 1 Blk) in the loss that saw North Florida shoot 63% from the floor in the first 20 minutes and 51% overall. The Terriers then snapped their losing streak by defeating Hartford 74–67, in a come from behind victory where Jewell and Hopkinson each scored 20 points. The Terriers closed out the month of November with a 2–4 record.

==== December ====
Terriers huddle on December 10, 2015 against NJIT at The Pope.

St. Francis Brooklyn recorded their second straight comeback win on the road, defeating the Lafayette Leopards, 69-62, on Wednesday evening at Kirby Sports Center. Senior wing Tyreek Jewell led the Terriers with 17 points and freshman guard Dagur Kár Jónsson added a season-high 15 points. Junior guard Yunus Hopkinson contributed 10 points and handed out a team-high four assists, while senior forward Amdy Fall grabbed a game-high 13 rebounds. The Terriers win streak was snapped by St. John's, a 56–63 loss, in the ECAC Holiday Festival at Madison Square Garden. In the closely contested game, St. Francis was down 55–57 deep into the second half until St. John's pulled away. Despite placing five players in double-digit scoring for the first time this season, St. Francis Brooklyn fell to the NJIT Highlanders in overtime, 92–86. The Terrier losing streak extended to three games as they fell to Manhattan 60–71. St. Francis was led by senior forward Antonio Jenifer's career-high 17 points on 6-of-8 shooting yet the season-high 19 turnovers by the Terriers was too much to overcome. After missing three games it was announced that starting point guard Glen Sanabria would have surgery to repair his partially torn labrum in his left shoulder, ending his season. St. Francis snapped their 3-game losing streak against Liberty, 64–55. Seniors Tyreek Jewell and Antonio Jenifer combined for half of the Terriers scoring output, producing 32 points. The Terriers then traveled to Jersey City to face Saint Peter's where they lost 45–56. In the loss the Terriers shot 39% overall, 21% from the 3-point line and 44% from the free-throw line. In addition they committed a season-high 21 turnovers in the losing effort. The Terriers closed out their non-conference portion of the schedule with a loss against Albany, 66–71. St. Francis finished the mont at 2–5 and are 4–9 overall.

=== Northeast conference games ===
==== January ====
St. Francis lost their first two conference games on the road against Fairleigh Dickinson (77–86) and Mount St. Mary's (40–44, OT). At Fairleigh Dickinson, the Terriers were led by Chris Hooper's 19 points off the bench and Amdy Fall's 15 points, 10 rebounds, and 7 rejections. At Mount St. Mary's, St. Francis was led by Tyreek Jewell (13 pts, 8 reb) in the losing effort. The Terriers then snapped their four-game losing streak by defeating St. Francis (PA), 73–56. The Terriers led the entire game and defeated the Red Flash for the 6th consecutive time, as they were led by Tyreek Jewell (17 pts, 3 reb, 3 ast). St. Francis then defeated the Robert Morris Colonials, 56–49, behind a 14-point 10 rebound performance by Antonio Jenifer. With the win the Terriers climbed back to 2–2 in conference games. At Bryant, St Francis lost 59–61, in a game that went down to the wire, with the game winning shot made with 4 seconds left. Jewell (20 pts, 1 reb, 2 ast) and Fall (12 pts, 10 reb, 1 blk) led the Terriers in the losing effort. The Terriers then hosted Sacred Heart and won 85–67, behind a 23-point performance by Jewell. So far, the Terriers have been perfect at home (3–0) and win-less on the road (0–3). Against Wagner, the Terriers win-streak at home came to an end in a 59–83 loss. After the 9 minute mark, Wagner never trailed despite a strong effort by Chris Hooper (22 pts, 3 reb, 1 blk, 1 stl) off the bench. The Terriers next took to the road in the 41st Battle of Brooklyn against the LIU Blackbirds, where the Terriers won 64–49. The Terriers had 4 players with double-digit scoring and 2 with double-digit rebounds. St. Francis then lost at Wagner 61–64, in a closely contested game. The Terriers closed out the month against Central Connecticut on the road with a 60–49 win. The Terriers ended the month with a 5–5 record in conference play and 9–14 overall.

==== February ====
The Terriers opened the month with a loss against Sacred Heart, 70–74. St. Francis Brooklyn almost overcame a 17-point deficit but came up short as they were edged by the Sacred Heart Pioneers. Tyreek Jewell had a career-high 29 points and came up with a game-high four steals in the losing effort. St. Francis then won its next two at home against Fairleigh Dickinson and Central Connecticut. The Terriers upset then first-placed Fairleigh Dickinson 85–71, with five players scoring in double-figures. Against Central Connecticut State, the Terriers came back from 16 down to defeat the Blue Devils, 74–67. Hopkinson, fresh off a 24-point night in the win against Fairleigh Dickinson last Saturday, exploded for 27 points as he made 7-of-12 attempts from behind the arc and Jenifer posted his fourth double-double of the season with 22 points and 15 rebounds, both career-bests. The Terriers then hosted the LIU Blackbirds and lost 67–82. Senior forward Chris Hooper paced four Terriers in double-figures with 15 points in the losing effort. St. Francis then defeated Saint Francis (PA) 70–58 on the road. They were led by Yunus Hopkinson (20 pts, 3reb, 1ast, 2stl) and Chris Hooper (18 pts, 5 reb, 1 stl, 1 blk). With the win, St. Francis Brooklyn gained sole possession of sixth-place and clinched a berth in the 2016 NEC Tournament by virtue of Bryant's loss to Sacred Heart. The Terriers closed out the regular season with three more consecutive wins against Robert Morris (82–72), Bryant (79–72), and Mount St. Mary's (55–49). The Terriers ended the regular season with a three-way tie for second place in the NEC and were the 4th seed in the conference tournament because of tiebreaker rules. Their overall record stood at 15–16 and their conference record at 11–7.

At the end of the season St. Francis Brooklyn junior guard Yunus Hopkinson, senior wing Tyreek Jewell, and senior forward Chris Hooper were named to the Third Team Northeast Conference squad. In addition, senior forward Amdy Fall was named the Defensive Player of the Year for the second consecutive season. Amdy Fall became the fourth player in NEC history to repeat as Defensive Player of the Year. The senior forward leads the NEC and ranks 29th nationally with 2.4 blocks per game. He has racked up 208 career blocks during his time in Brooklyn, tops among active NEC players. Akeem Bennett (2010–11) and Greg Nunn (2000-01) are former Terriers who have also been tabbed NEC Defensive Player of the Year.

== NEC Tournament ==
To end the regular season, the Terriers defeated Mount St. Mary's and would have to face them again in the opening round of the NEC Tournament. The Terriers with the 4th seed lost to Mount St. Mary's 51–60 at The Pope. Despite the loss, this is the 6th consecutive season the Terriers have qualified for the Tournament and their second consecutive year hosting games at The Pope.

== Roster ==
2015–16 St. Francis Brooklyn Terriers men's basketball team
Players
Coaches

| Pos. | # | Name | Height | Weight | Year | Previous school | Hometown |
|---|---|---|---|---|---|---|---|
| F | 15 | Chris Hooper | 6 ft 6 in (1.98 m) | 240 lb (109 kg) | Sr | Odessa College | Bronx, New York |
| F | 32 | Amdy Fall | 6 ft 7 in (2.01 m) | 225 lb (102 kg) | Sr | College of Central Florida | Manhattan, New York |
| G | 0 | Tyreek Jewell | 6 ft 1 in (1.85 m) | 185 lb (84 kg) | Sr | Jamestown Community College | Bronx, New York |
| F | 3 | Antonio Jenifer | 6 ft 7 in (2.01 m) | 215 lb (98 kg) | Sr | Hagerstown Community College | Hillcrest Heights, Maryland |
| G | 12 | Miles Rockafeler (W) | 6 ft 5 in (1.96 m) | 195 lb (88 kg) | Sr | St. Anthony's High School | Bronx, New York |
| F | 14 | Jonathan Doss | 6 ft 4 in (1.93 m) | 175 lb (79 kg) | RS Jr | Eastern Wyoming College | Chicago, Illinois |
| G | 2 | Yunus Hopkinson | 5 ft 10 in (1.78 m) | 180 lb (82 kg) | Jr | Lee Academy | Manhattan, New York |
| F | 33 | Jagos Lasic | 6 ft 8 in (2.03 m) | 185 lb (84 kg) | RS So | New Mexico Military Institute | Belgrade, Serbia |
| G | 10 | Glenn Sanabria (injured) (redshirt) | 5 ft 11 in (1.8 m) | 180 lb (82 kg) | So | St. Peter's Boys High School | Staten Island, New York |
| G/F | 4 | Gunnar Ólafsson | 6 ft 3 in (1.91 m) | 195 lb (88 kg) | So | Menntaskólinn við Hamrahlíð | Reykjavík, Iceland |
| F | 13 | Keon Williams | 6 ft 4 in (1.93 m) | 185 lb (84 kg) | RS Fr | John Hardin High School | Atlanta, Georgia |
| F | 11 | Joshua Nurse | 6 ft 9 in (2.06 m) | 195 lb (88 kg) | Fr | Queens High School of Teaching | Laurelton, New York |
| G | 1 | Dagur Kár Jónsson | 6 ft 1 in (1.85 m) | 165 lb (75 kg) | Fr | Fjölbrautaskólinn í Breiðholti | Reykjanesbær, Iceland |
| F | 21 | Marlon Alcindor | 6 ft 4 in (1.93 m) | 185 lb (84 kg) | RS Fr | High School for Construction | East Elmhurst, New York |
| C | 20 | Cori Johnson (redshirt) | 6 ft 9 in (2.06 m) | 270 lb (122 kg) | Fr | South Shore High School | Brooklyn, New York |
| F | 15 | Jahmel Bodrick (redshirt) | 6 ft 6 in (1.98 m) | 230 lb (104 kg) | Fr | Our Savior Lutheran High School | Bronx, New York |

Head coach

- Glenn Braica (Queens College '89)

Assistant coach(es)

- Clive Bentick (Canisius '01)
- Ron Ganulin (LIU '68)
- Jamaal Womack (St. Francis '09)

Legend

- (C) Team captain
- (S) Suspended
- (I) Ineligible
- (W) Walk-on
- Injured
- Current redshirt

Roster
Last update: November 3, 2015

== Schedule and results ==
| Date time, TV | Opponent | Result | Record | High points | High rebounds | High assists | Site (attendance) city, state |
Non-conference regular season
| November 14, 2015*; 2:00 pm, ESPN3 | at Boston College | L 49–75 | 0–1 | 12 – Jonsson | 7 – Fall | 3 – Jewell | Conte Forum (3,074); Chestnut Hill, MA |
| November 17, 2015*; 7:00 pm | Mount Saint Vincent | W 93–67 | 1–1 | 25 – Hopkinson | 9 – Doss | 4 – Jewell | Generoso Pope Athletic Complex (483); Brooklyn, NY |
| November 21, 2015*; 8:00 pm, FSMW+ | at Saint Louis; Brooklyn Hoops Classic | L 60–76 | 1–2 | 12 – Jewell | 8 – Hooper | 6 – Sanabria | Chaifetz Arena (6,087); St. Louis, MO |
| November 24, 2015*; 7:00 pm, MSG+/ESPN3 | at Louisville; Brooklyn Hoops Classic | L 41–85 | 1–3 | 11 – 2 tied | 6 – Fall | 2 – 2 tied | KFC Yum! Center (19,112); Louisville, KY |
| November 28, 2015*; 7:00 pm | vs. North Florida; Brooklyn Hoops Classic | L 65–78 | 1–4 | 13 – Fall | 10 – Fall | 5 – Sanabria | Chase Arena at Reich Family Pavilion (152); Hartford, CT |
| November 29, 2015*; 4:00 pm | at Hartford; Brooklyn Hoops Classic | W 74–67 | 2–4 | 20 – 2 tied | 7 – Hooper | 3 – 2 tied | Chase Arena at Reich Family Pavilion (507); Hartford, CT |
| December 2, 2015*; 7:00 pm | at Lafayette (PA) | W 69–62 | 3–4 | 17 – Jewell | 13 – Fall | 4 – Hopkinson | Kirby Sports Center (1,132); Easton, PA |
| December 6, 2015*; 11:00 am, FS1 | at St. John's; MSG Holiday Festival | L 56–63 | 3–5 | 10 – 2 tied | 10 – Fall | 3 – Hopkinson | Madison Square Garden (7,196); New York City, NY |
| December 10, 2015*; 7:00 pm | NJIT | L 86–92 ^{OT} | 3–6 | 21 – Jewell | 11 – Jenifer | 11 – Hopkinson | Generoso Pope Athletic Complex (575); Brooklyn, NY |
| December 14, 2015*; 7:00 pm | at Manhattan | L 60–71 | 3–7 | 17 – Jenifer | 8 – Hooper | 4 – Hopkinson | Draddy Gymnasium (614); Riverdale, NY |
| December 20, 2015*; 4:00 pm | Liberty | W 64–55 | 4–7 | 17 – Jewell | 11 – Jewell | 4 – 2 tied | Generoso Pope Athletic Complex (325); Brooklyn, NY |
| December 23, 2015*; 4:00 pm | at Saint Peter's | L 45–56 | 4–8 | 13 – Jewell | 7 – Jewell | 1 – 5 tied | Yanitelli Center (131); Jersey City, NJ |
| December 29, 2015*; 7:00 pm | Albany | L 66–71 | 4–9 | 17 – Hooper | 11 – Jewell | 3 – Hooper | Generoso Pope Athletic Complex (708); Brooklyn, NY |
NEC Regular Season
| January 2, 2016; 4:30 pm | at Fairleigh Dickinson | L 77–86 | 4–10 (0–1) | 19 – Hooper | 10 – Fall | 6 – Hopkinson | Rothman Center (638); Hackensack, NJ |
| January 4, 2016; 7:00 pm | at Mount St. Mary's | L 40–44 ^{OT} | 4–11 (0–2) | 13 – Jewell | 9 – Fall | 2 – Hooper | Knott Arena (1,120); Emmitsburg, MD |
| January 7, 2016; 7:00 pm | Saint Francis (PA) | W 73–56 | 5–11 (1–2) | 17 – Jewell | 8 – Jenifer | 6 – Hopkinson | Generoso Pope Athletic Complex (275); Brooklyn, NY |
| January 9, 2016; 4:00 pm | Robert Morris | W 56–49 | 6–11 (2–2) | 10 – 3 tied | 14 – Jenifer | 4 – Jewell | Generoso Pope Athletic Complex (375); Brooklyn, NY |
| January 14, 2016; 7:00 pm | at Bryant | L 59–61 | 6–12 (2–3) | 20 – Jewell | 10 – Fall | 2 – 3 tied | Chace Athletic Center (432); Smithfield, RI |
| January 16, 2016; 4:00 pm | Sacred Heart | W 85–67 | 7–12 (3–3) | 23 – Jewell | 9 – Fall | 5 – Jewell | Generoso Pope Athletic Complex (325); Brooklyn, NY |
| January 21, 2016; 7:00 pm | Wagner | L 59–83 | 7–13 (3–4) | 22 – Hooper | 7 – Jewell | 4 – Hopkinson | Generoso Pope Athletic Complex (405); Brooklyn, NY |
| January 23, 2016; 3:00 pm, ESPN3 | at LIU Brooklyn; Battle of Brooklyn | W 64–49 | 8–13 (4–4) | 15 – Hooper | 13 – Fall | 3 – Hopkinson | Steinberg Wellness Center (417); Brooklyn, NY |
| January 28, 2016; 7:00 pm, MSG/FCS | at Wagner | L 61–64 | 8–14 (4–5) | 18 – Hopkinson | 10 – Fall | 1 – 5 tied | Spiro Sports Center (1,708); Staten Island, NY |
| January 30, 2016; 3:30 pm | at Central Connecticut | W 60–49 | 9–14 (5–5) | 15 – Hooper | 10 – Jewell | 3 – Jewell | William H. Detrick Gymnasium (1,217); New Britain, CT |
| February 4, 2016; 7:00 pm | at Sacred Heart | L 70–74 | 9–15 (5–6) | 29 – Jewell | 6 – Hooper | 4 – Hopkinson | William H. Pitt Center; Fairfield, CT |
| February 6, 2016; 4:00 pm | Fairleigh Dickinson | W 85–71 | 10–15 (6–6) | 24 – Hopkinson | 10 – Jewell | 4 – Hopkinson | Generoso Pope Athletic Complex (355); Brooklyn, NY |
| February 11, 2016; 7:00 pm, MSG/FCS | Central Connecticut | W 74–67 | 11–15 (7–6) | 27 – Hopkinson | 15 – Jenifer | 3 – Jewell | Generoso Pope Athletic Complex (355); Brooklyn, NY |
| February 15, 2016; 1:00 pm, ESPNU | LIU Brooklyn | L 67–82 | 11–16 (7–7) | 15 – Hooper | 8 – Jenifer | 5 – Hopkinson | Generoso Pope Athletic Complex (825); Brooklyn, NY |
| February 18, 2016; 7:00 pm | at Saint Francis (PA) | W 70–58 | 12–16 (8–7) | 20 – Hopkinson | 8 – Fall | 2 – Fall | DeGol Arena (1,381); Loretto, PA |
| February 20, 2016; 7:00 pm | at Robert Morris | W 82–72 | 13–16 (9–7) | 24 – Hopkinson | 9 – Jenifer | 5 – Hopkinson | Charles L. Sewall Center (2,284); Moon Township, PA |
| February 25, 2016; 7:00 pm | Bryant | W 79–72 | 14–16 (10–7) | 24 – Jenifer | 11 – Jenifer | 4 – 2 tied | Generoso Pope Athletic Complex (465); Brooklyn, NY |
| February 27, 2016; 4:00 pm | Mount St. Mary's | W 55–49 | 15–16 (11–7) | 14 – Jenifer | 13 – Jenifer | 3 – Jenifer | Generoso Pope Athletic Complex (675); Brooklyn, NY |
Northeast Conference tournament
| March 2, 2016; 9:00 pm | (5) Mount St. Mary's; Quarterfinals | L 51–60 | 15–17 | 18 – Hopkinson | 9 – Fall | 5 – Hooper | Generoso Pope Athletic Complex (675); Brooklyn, NY |
*Non-conference game. ^{#}Rankings from AP Poll. (#) Tournament seedings in parentheses. All times are in Eastern Time.

== Season statistics ==
Individual Player Statistics (As of March 6, 2016)
| | | | Minutes | | Scoring | | Total FGs | | | 3-point FGs | | | Free-Throws | | | Rebounds | | | | | | | |
| Player | GP | GS | Tot | Avg | Pts | Avg | FG | FGA | Pct | 3FG | 3FA | Pct | FT | FTA | Pct | Off | Def | Tot | Avg | A | TO | Blk | Stl |
|---|---|---|---|---|---|---|---|---|---|---|---|---|---|---|---|---|---|---|---|---|---|---|---|
| Jewell, Tyreek | 31 | 31 | 1015 | 32.7 | 400 | 12.9 | 136 | 354 | .384 | 44 | 150 | .293 | 84 | 127 | .661 | 63 | 112 | 175 | 5.6 | 66 | 62 | 8 | 33 |
| Hopkinson, Yunus | 31 | 24 | 885 | 28.5 | 373 | 12.0 | 112 | 329 | .340 | 71 | 195 | .364 | 78 | 93 | .839 | 10 | 66 | 76 | 2.5 | 89 | 69 | 0 | 27 |
| Hooper, Chris | 31 | 10 | 656 | 21.2 | 356 | 11.5 | 139 | 235 | .591 | 0 | 2 | .000 | 78 | 137 | .569 | 59 | 96 | 155 | 5.0 | 43 | 75 | 38 | 33 |
| Jenifer, Antonio | 31 | 21 | 761 | 24.5 | 265 | 8.5 | 86 | 212 | .406 | 28 | 98 | .286 | 65 | 90 | .722 | 56 | 139 | 195 | 6.3 | 33 | 49 | 23 | 18 |
| Sanabria, Glenn | 6 | 6 | 145 | 24.2 | 51 | 8.5 | 17 | 52 | .327 | 10 | 30 | .333 | 7 | 10 | .700 | 2 | 5 | 7 | 1.2 | 19 | 10 | 1 | 7 |
| Fall, Amdy | 31 | 31 | 755 | 24.4 | 174 | 5.6 | 55 | 125 | .440 | 0 | 0 | .000 | 64 | 98 | .653 | 72 | 136 | 208 | 6.7 | 25 | 46 | 73 | 26 |
| Doss, Jonathon | 24 | 1 | 344 | 14.3 | 96 | 4.0 | 34 | 97 | .351 | 23 | 76 | .303 | 5 | 11 | .455 | 12 | 37 | 49 | 2.0 | 13 | 11 | 2 | 7 |
| Jónsson, Dagur | 31 | 1 | 535 | 17.3 | 128 | 4.1 | 41 | 145 | .283 | 24 | 92 | .261 | 22 | 32 | .688 | 8 | 31 | 39 | 1.3 | 41 | 38 | 0 | 6 |
| Olafsson, Gunnar | 26 | 23 | 547 | 21.0 | 98 | 3.8 | 37 | 95 | .389 | 18 | 63 | .286 | 6 | 8 | .750 | 17 | 33 | 50 | 1.9 | 17 | 20 | 3 | 14 |
| Alcindor, Marlon | 8 | 0 | 30 | 3.8 | 17 | 2.1 | 5 | 14 | .357 | 4 | 9 | .444 | 3 | 4 | .750 | 0 | 2 | 2 | 0.3 | 0 | 1 | 0 | 0 |
| Williams, Keon | 27 | 7 | 485 | 18.0 | 77 | 2.9 | 27 | 72 | .375 | 12 | 41 | .293 | 11 | 19 | .579 | 25 | 41 | 66 | 2.4 | 11 | 19 | 5 | 16 |
| Lasic, Jagos | 8 | 0 | 26 | 3.3 | 4 | 0.5 | 2 | 5 | .400 | 0 | 3 | .000 | 0 | 0 | .000 | 1 | 5 | 6 | 0.8 | 1 | 1 | 0 | 1 |
| Rockafeler, Miles | 7 | 0 | 4 | 0.6 | 0 | 0.0 | 0 | 1 | .000 | 0 | 0 | .000 | 0 | 2 | .000 | 0 | 0 | 0 | 0.0 | 1 | 1 | 0 | 0 |
| Nurse, Joshua | 14 | 0 | 62 | 4.4 | 5 | 0.4 | 0 | 3 | .000 | 0 | 0 | .000 | 5 | 7 | .714 | 3 | 10 | 13 | 0.9 | 0 | 5 | 2 | 2 |
| Team | | | | | | | | | | | | | | | | 55 | 49 | 104 | 3.5 | | 19 | | |
| Total | 31 | | 6250 | | 2044 | 65.9 | 691 | 1739 | .397 | 234 | 759 | .308 | 428 | 638 | .671 | 383 | 762 | 1145 | 36.9 | 359 | 426 | 155 | 190 |
| Opponents | 31 | | 6250 | | 2071 | 66.8 | 743 | 1742 | .427 | 149 | 447 | .333 | 436 | 611 | .714 | 336 | 779 | 1115 | 36.0 | 361 | 401 | 90 | 199 |

Legend
| GP | Games played | GS | Games started | Avg | Average per game |
| FG | Field-goals made | FGA | Field-goal attempts | Off | Offensive rebounds |
| Def | Defensive rebounds | A | Assists | TO | Turnovers |
| Blk | Blocks | Stl | Steals | High | Team high |

== Awards and honors ==
Amdy Fall

- 2015–16 NEC Defensive Player of the Year

Tyreek Jewell

- Selected to the 2015–16 NEC men's basketball All-Conference third team

Chris Hooper

- Selected to the 2015–16 NEC men's basketball All-Conference third team

Yunus Hopkinson

- Selected to the 2015–16 NEC men's basketball All-Conference third team

== Milestones and records ==
- On December 10, 2015 the St. Francis Brooklyn Terriers attempted 49 three-pointers against NJIT, the most in conference history in a single game.

== See also ==
- 2015–16 St. Francis Brooklyn Terriers women's basketball team
