= 2014–15 St. Francis Brooklyn Terriers men's basketball team =

American college basketball season

2014–15 St. Francis Brooklyn Terriers men's basketball

NEC Regular Season Champions

NIT, First round
- Conference: Northeast Conference
- Record: 23–12 (15–3 NEC)
- Head coach: Glenn Braica (5th season)
- Assistant coaches: Clive Bentick (8th season); Ron Ganulin (2nd season); Jamaal Womack (2nd season)
- Home arena: Generoso Pope Athletic Complex; Madison Square Garden

2014–15 Northeast Conference men's basketball standings
	Conf.				Overall
Team	W		L	PCT	W		L	PCT
St. Francis Brooklyn	15	–	3	.833	23	–	12	.657
Robert Morris †	12	–	6	.667	20	–	15	.571
Bryant	12	–	6	.667	16	–	15	.516
Mount St. Mary's	11	–	7	.611	15	–	15	.500
Saint Francis	9	–	9	.500	16	–	16	.500
Sacred Heart	9	–	9	.500	15	–	17	.469
LIU Brooklyn	8	–	10	.444	12	–	18	.400
Wagner	8	–	10	.444	10	–	20	.333
Fairleigh Dickinson	3	–	15	.167	8	–	21	.276
Central Connecticut	3	–	15	.167	5	–	26	.161
† 2015 NEC tournament winner

The 2014–15 St. Francis Brooklyn Terriers men's basketball team represented St. Francis College during the 2014–15 NCAA Division I men's basketball season. The Terrier's home games were played at the Generoso Pope Athletic Complex. They also hosted one home game at Madison Square Garden, defeating Central Connecticut in the second game of a double header that saw St. John's defeat Marquette. The team has been a member of the Northeast Conference since 1981. St. Francis Brooklyn was coached by Glenn Braica, who was in his fifth year at the helm of the Terriers and has made the NEC Tournament each year.

The Terriers, for the first time in the program's history, were selected as the preseason 2014–15 NEC favorites by league head coaches. The program was also selected to participate in the 3rd annual 2014 Barclays Center Classic and faced Rutgers, LaSalle, Norfolk State and Tennessee State. The Terriers went 1–3, winning the consolation game of the Campus Site Bracket. St. Francis Brooklyn ended the non-conference portion of their schedule at 6–7 after opening the season with a five-game losing streak.

On January 31, 2015, the Terriers gained sole possession of 1st place in the NEC after defeating LIU Brooklyn in the annual Battle of Brooklyn. For St. Francis Brooklyn, it marked the first time being in first place after 10 games since starting 8–2 in the 2003–04 season. That year the Terriers finished 12–6 and shared the NEC regular season title with Monmouth. On February 21, 2015, the Terriers clinched the NEC Regular Season Championship and recorded their first 20+ win season since the 1998–99 season. Prior to the beginning of the NEC Tournament, the NEC announced Glenn Braica as the Jim Phelan Coach of the Year, Jalen Cannon as the NEC Player of the Year and Amdy Fall as the NEC Defensive Player of the Year.

In the NEC Tournament, the Terriers defeated LIU Brooklyn and Saint Francis (PA) to reach the Championship game, where they lost to Robert Morris and thus did not secure the NEC's automatic NCAA tournament bid. They did participate in the National Invitational Tournament by virtue of having won the NEC regular season championship. It was the program's first NIT postseason appearance since 1963. The Terriers traveled to Richmond, Virginia to face the Spiders and lost 74–84 in the first round of the NIT. The Terriers ended their season at 23–12 overall, tying the program's record for wins in a season last set in 1953–54.

Having fallen just one game short of qualifying for the NCAA tournament, St. Francis remained one of five teams to have never appeared in any NCAA tournament despite being eligible for every edition since the inaugural tournament in 1939 (Northwestern qualified in 2017 to leave just four teams with this distinction.)

== Preseason ==
The Terriers lost three players to graduation: shooting guard Ben Mockford, center Matt Milk, and forward Aleksander Isailovic. The biggest loss was Mockford, who led the team in 3-point shooting and was second in scoring last season. The Terriers also lost 4 players to transfers: Anthony White, P.J. Santavenere, Wayne Martin and Sheldon Hagigal. These four players were suspended last year because of misconduct and their transfers may be related to the event. Martin, Hagigal and White were critical components to last year's team.

The Terriers added 8 players to their roster: Keon Williams, Glenn Sanabria, Gunnar Ólafsson, Chris Hooper, Antonio Jenifer, Jonathan Doss, Marlon Alcindor and Tyreek Jewell. For the 2014–15 season Keon Williams, Jonathan Doss and Marlon Alcindor were redshirts.

- Sanabria, a 5 ft 11" point guard from St. Peter's Boys High School on Staten Island, averaged 13.6 points per game and led St. Peter's to the Catholic league semifinals, the furthest a Staten Island team has gone in over a decade, and the school's first Staten Island High School League crown since 2009.
- Ólafsson, a 6'2" wing has played for Keflavík in his native Iceland for the past two seasons. He averaged 8.9 points and 2.8 rebounds this past year under former Terrier assistant coach Andy Johnston.
- The 6'6" Hooper prepped at Satellite Academy before playing one season at both Kaskaskia College and at Odessa College. Hooper, who averaged 12.3 points and 11.3 rebounds in his senior year at Satellite Academy will have two years of eligibility at St. Francis Brooklyn.
- Jewell is a 6' 1" wing from the Bronx, New York and has 2 years of eligibility for St. Francis. Jewell previously played for Jamestown Community College and is a 2014 National Junior College Athletic Association Division II Second Team All-American.
- Doss is a 6’4” wing who will provide the Terriers with another option from behind the arc. Last season, the native of Chicago, Illinois shot 40% from long distance en route to averaging 18 points per game for Eastern Wyoming Community College.
- The 6’7” Jenifer was an NJCAA All-American at Hagerstown Community College during his sophomore season in 2012–13 after averaging 21 points per game while pulling down eight rebounds and shooting 47% in 33 games played.
- The 6’4” Williams, who was selected to play in the Kentucky/Indiana All-Stars boys’ All-Stars contest at Rupp Arena, scored more than 1,000 points in his career at John Hardin High School and finished fourth on the school's all-time scoring list. He averaged 18.6 points, 7.7 rebounds, 2.4 steals and 1.9 blocks per game last year.
- Alcindor is a 6’4” forward that played his final high school season at High School for Construction where he led his team to a 20–3 record in 2013–2014, with 18.6 ppg and 5.1 rpg.

=== Departures ===
Name	Number	Pos.	Height	Weight	Year	Hometown	Notes
Ben Mockford	3	G	6'2"	175	Senior	Shoreham-by-Sea, England	Graduated, named to Great Britain's senior squad for the EuroBasket and signed with Cáceres of the Spanish LEB Plata league.
Matt Milk	33	C	6'8"	220	Senior	Wantagh, New York	Graduated
Aleksander Isailovic	25	G	6'4"	185	Senior	Belgrade, Serbia	Graduated
Anthony White	44	G	6'2"	190	Sophomore	Mastic, New York	Transferred
P.J. Santavenere	11	G	6'2"	175	Junior	Middletown, Connecticut	Transferred to University of Bridgeport
Sheldon Hagigal	43	G	6'1"	175	Freshman	Westbury, New York	Transferred to Midwestern State University
Wayne Martin	45	F	6'6"	215	Freshman	Brooklyn, New York	Transferred to Tennessee State University

=== Incoming transfers ===
Name	Number	Pos.	Height	Weight	Year	Hometown	Previous School
Chris Hooper	15	F	6'6"	230	Junior	Bronx, NY	Junior college transfer from Odessa College
Tyreek Jewell	0	G/F	6'1"	180	Junior	Bronx, NY	Junior college transfer from Jamestown Community College
Jonathan Doss	14	G/F	6'4"	175	Junior	Chicago, IL	Junior college transfer from Eastern Wyoming College
Antonio Jenifer	3	F	6'7"	215	Junior	Hillcrest Heights, MD	Junior college transfer from Hagerstown Community College

=== Class of 2014 signees ===
College recruiting
Name	Hometown	School	Height	Weight	Commit date
Glenn Sanabria; PG	Staten Island, NY	St. Peter's Boys High School	5 ft 11 in (1.80 m)	165 lb (75 kg)	Mar 26, 2014
Glenn Sanabria; PG	Recruit ratings: No ratings found				
Gunnar Ólafsson; SG/SF	Reykjavík, Iceland	Menntaskólinn við Hamrahlíð	6 ft 3 in (1.91 m)	195 lb (88 kg)	
Gunnar Ólafsson; SG/SF	Recruit ratings: No ratings found				
Keon Williams; Forward	Radcliff, KY	John Hardin High School	6 ft 4 in (1.93 m)	175 lb (79 kg)	
Keon Williams; Forward	Recruit ratings: No ratings found				
Marlon Alcindor; SG	Queens, NY	High School for Construction Trades, Engineering and Architecture	6 ft 4 in (1.93 m)	185 lb (84 kg)	
Marlon Alcindor; SG	Recruit ratings: No ratings found				
Overall recruit ranking:
Note: In many cases, Scout, Rivals, 247Sports, On3, and ESPN may conflict in their listings of height and weight.; In these cases, the average was taken. ESPN grades are on a 100-point scale.; Sources: "2014 St. Francis Brooklyn Signees". Rivals.; "2014 St. Francis Brooklyn Signees". Scout.; "2014 St. Francis Brooklyn Signees". ESPN.; "Scout.com Team Recruiting Rankings". Scout.; "2014 Team Ranking". Rivals.; "2014 St. Francis Brooklyn Signees". 247Sports.

=== Season outlook ===
In Glenn Braica's first four seasons, the Terriers have made the NEC tournament each year. Going into this season Braica has a combined 60–62 overall record and 39–31 conference record. Last year the Terriers earned the fifth seed in the conference, yet for the fourth season in a row the Terriers were eliminated in the quarterfinals. The Terriers, for the first time in the program's history as members of the NEC, were selected as the preseason 2014–15 NEC favorites by league head coaches. St. Francis Brooklyn claimed six first-place votes to finish ahead of Central Connecticut, which earned three first place nods. Braica, now in his fifth year, has stressed defense and rebounding since taking over the program in 2010. Last season, St. Francis Brooklyn led the NEC in scoring defense (66.8) and rebound margin (+3.2/game). They also ranked second in field goal percentage defense (.410), three-point percentage defense (.333) and blocked shots (5.3).

== Regular season ==
=== Non-conference games ===
==== November ====
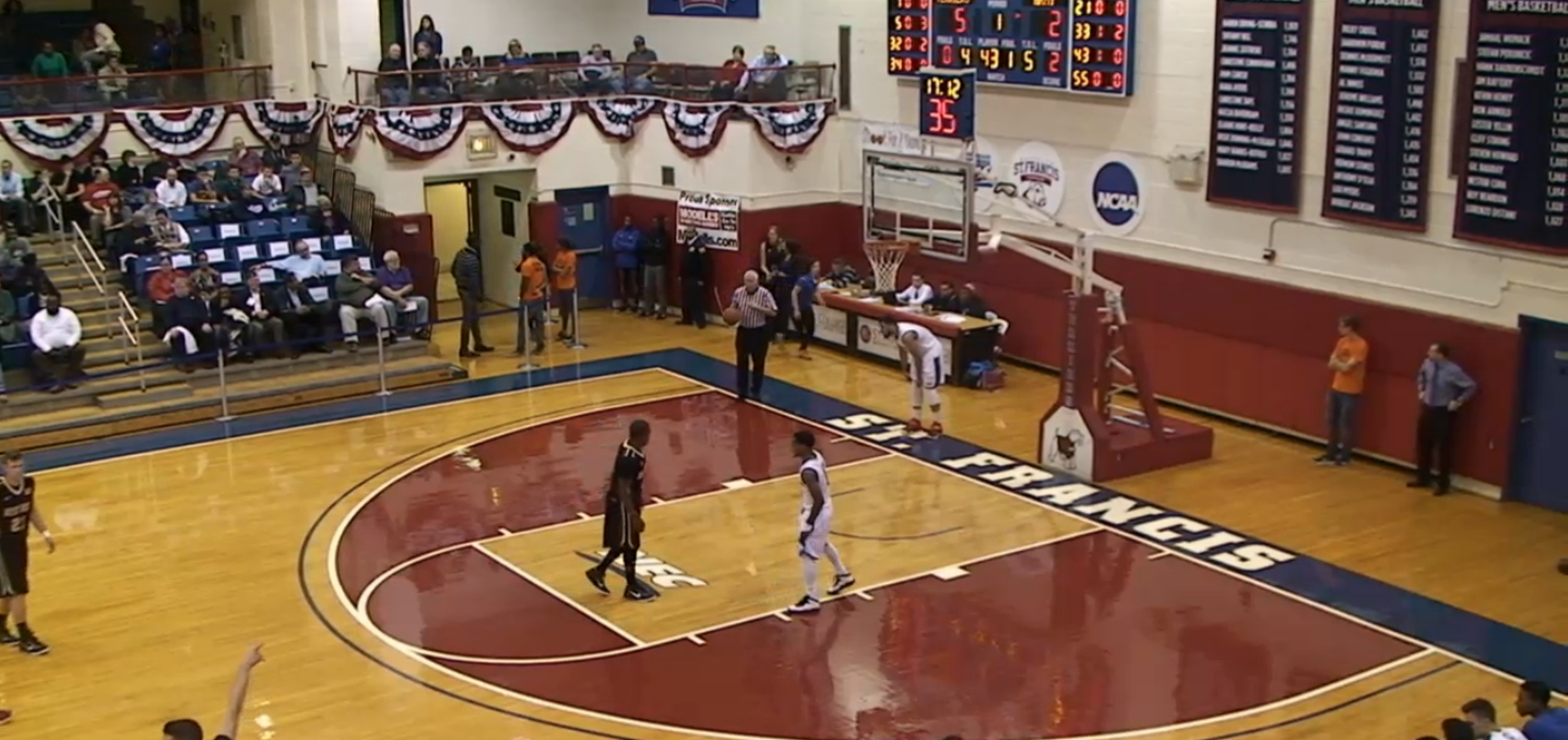
St. Francis vs Army at The Pope on November 19, 2014.

The Terriers opened their schedule on the road against Georgetown, where they were looking to upset in the season opener as they did last year against then reigning ACC Champions Miami (FL). The Terriers ended up losing 83–62 to the Hoyas and the all-time series between the programs is tied at 1–1; the other time they met was during the 1952–53 season in which the Terriers defeated the Hoyas 77–52. Senior Guard Brent Jones led the team in points (13), assists (6) and steals (4,) but also led in turnovers (8). In the Terriers homecoming game, they hosted the Army Black Knights for Military Appreciation Day. The Terriers were led by a strong performance from Cannon, who had his season first double-double, as the game came down to the wire but in the end they lost 71–74. St. Francis then traveled to Piscataway, New Jersey to face the Scarlet Knights as part of the Barclays Center Classic field where they lost 73–76. For the third game in a row the Terriers out-rebounded their opponents but also turned the ball over 17, 20 and 21 times respectively for a 3-game losing streak. Against Rutgers, St. Francis almost pulled out the upset as they were leading with 1:09 to play yet they came up short and were not helped by Cannon's foul trouble limiting him to playing only 12 minutes. The Terriers were aided by surprising performances from newcomers Jewel, Jennifer and Hooper, as Douglas led the team in points and rebounds. At La Salle the Terriers losing streak increased to 4, as they were defeated 60–73. The Terriers were led by Brent Jones (13 Pts, 3 Ast, 2 Reb and 3 Stl) and Jalen Cannon (11 Pts, 13 Reb, 1 Ast, 2 Stl and 1 Blk) yet they could not stop La Salle's Jordan Price, who scored 30 points. St. Francis then traveled to Jersey City, New Jersey to participate in the campus portion of the Barclays Center Classic at the Yanitelli Center, home of the Saint Peter's Peacocks. In the opening round they faced Norfolk State losing 70–72 in overtime, as they were led by Jalen Cannon (23 Pts, 9 Reb and 3 Stl). The loss extended the Terriers losing streak to 5 games making it the first time since the 2011–12 season that they opened a season 0–5. The Terriers five opponents have a combined 19–6 record thus far and the Terriers have lost three of the five contests by three points or less. With the loss the Terriers then faced Tennessee State in the consolation game of the Barclays Center Classic, where they won 59–57 for their first victory of the season. The team was again led by Jalen Cannon (15 Pts, 14 Reb, 1 Ast, 2 Blk) with help from Brent Jones and Kevin Douglas. The Terriers closed out the month 1–5, playing 5 games away from the Pope.

==== December ====
St. Francis extended its win streak to 2 games by defeating Liberty 65–54, as they were led by Cannon's and Jones' 16 points apiece. The Terriers then snapped their win streak with a 66–68 loss to NJIT, which had just come off defeating then #17 ranked Michigan. St. Francis next faced Mount St. Vincent at home where they won 90–72 as they were led by Brent Jones (25 Pts, 6 Reb, 6 Ast, 2 Stl) and Jalen Cannon (18 Pts, 12 Reb, 3 Ast, 2 Stl, 5 Blk). For only the third time so far this season the Terriers played at home, against Delaware State where they lost 64–72. The Terriers were once again led by Jalen Cannon (16 Pts, 10 Reb, 1 Ast, 2 Blk) who recorded his fifth double-double of the season. The squad was stagnant on offense, only shooting 37% from the floor and 14% from 3-point range and their defense while solid, out rebounding the Hornets by a 45–25 margin, could not slow down Delaware State senior Amere May, who scored 48 points (an NCAA D-I season high). The Terriers then went on a three-game win streak to close out their non-conference schedule by defeating Florida Atlantic, Monmouth and Columbia. Against Florida Atlantic, St. Francis won 61–56 as they were led by Cannon (17 Pts, 10 Reb, 2 Ast, 2 Stl). Florida Atlantic had won its previous 4 contest prior to losing to St. Francis in a close contest. At Monmouth the Terriers were again led by Cannon (16 Pts, 13 Reb, 1 Stl, 1 Blk) who has an NEC-leading seven "double-doubles" and became the Terriers' all-time leader in made free throws and now has 340 for his career. St. Francis defeated the Hawks 71–46 in their most lopsided victory of the season. St. Francis closed out their non-conference schedule by hosting Columbia and defeating them 72–64. St. Francis Brooklyn led from start to finish en route to perhaps their most impressive victory of the season as they answered every run by the visitors and were led by Brent Jones (19 Pts, 2 Reb, 3 Ast, 1 Stl) and Jalen Cannon (15 Pts, 12 Reb, 5 Ast, 1 Blk). The Terriers closed out the month at 5–2 and 6–7 overall.

=== Northeast Conference games ===
==== January ====
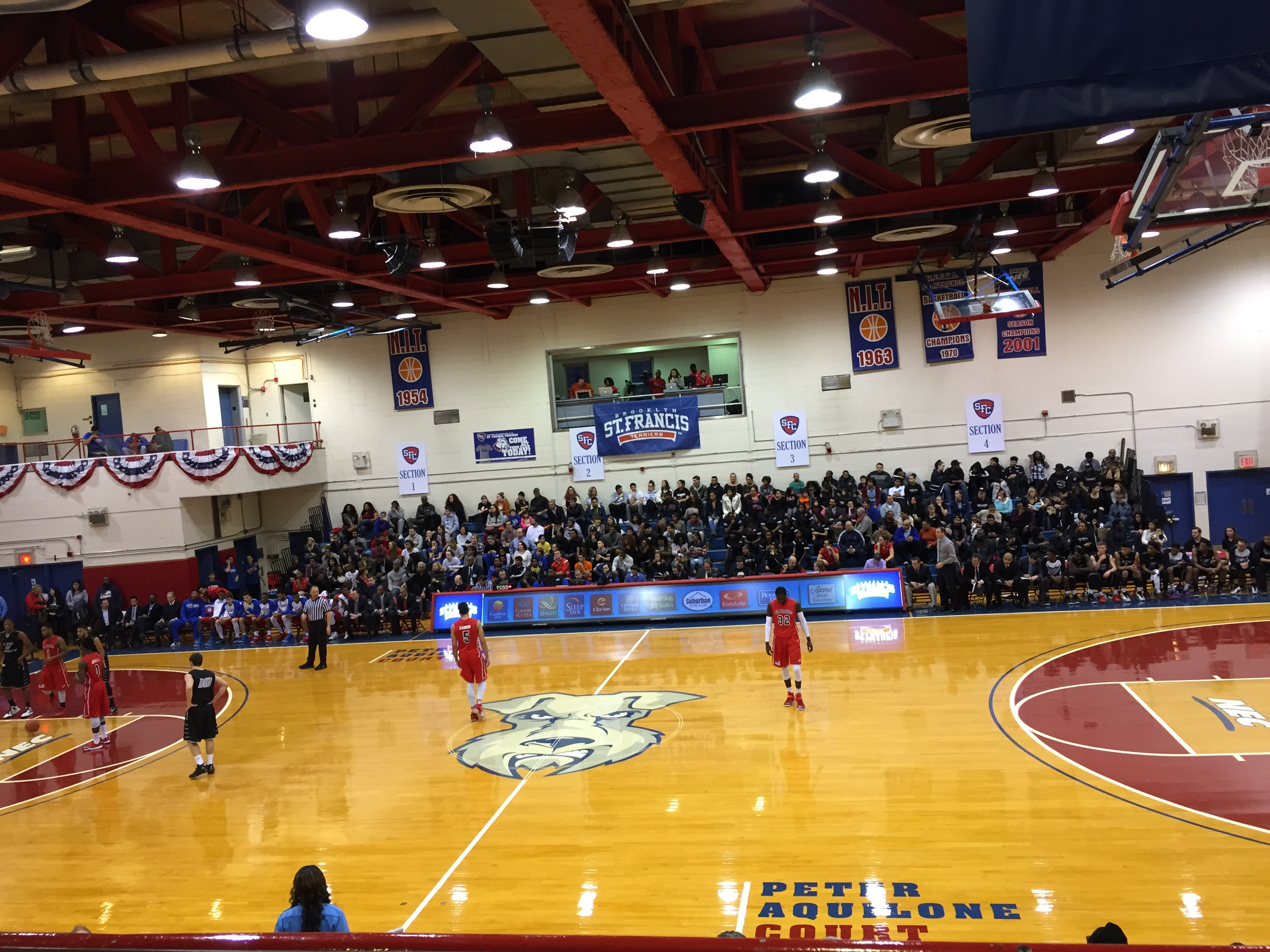
St. Francis vs LIU in the annual Battle of Brooklyn at The Pope on January 31, 2015.

St. Francis Brooklyn, who trailed by as many as 18 points late in the first half against Sacred Heart, improved to 7–7 and have won five straight conference openers dating to the 2010–11 season. It was their fourth straight victory of the season and seventh in their last nine outings. St. Francis senior forward Jalen Cannon produced his sixth straight "double-double" with 21 points and 13 rebounds to lead the way in their 73–71 victory. The Terriers then faced Bryant, and extended their win streak to 5 games as they defeated them 63–47. Junior Amdy Fall recorded his second "double-double" of the season with 11 points and 10 rebounds to go along with a game-high four blocks. Junior forward Tyreek Jewell led the hosts with 15 points and senior guard Brent Jones added 13 points and a game-high six assists. Jones also became just the second player in St. Francis Brooklyn history (Greg Nunn, 1997-2001) to reach 500 points and 500 assists when he found Jewell on an inbounds pass early in the second-half. The Terriers never trailed in the contest and led by as many as 20 points with 3:13 remaining in the opening half. The St. Francis Brooklyn Terriers won their sixth consecutive contest as they defeated the Fairleigh Dickinson Knights, 78–69 at Stratis Arena. The Terriers improved to 9–7 (3–0 NEC) while the Knights fell to 7–7 (2–1 NEC). Senior forward Jalen Cannon recorded a game-high 19 points on 7-of-8 shooting and also grabbed nine boards to pace the Terriers. Senior guard Brent Jones produced 14 points and five assists and freshman guard Glenn Sanabria recorded 12 points and five helpers. In their next contest the Mount St. Mary's Mountaineers defeated St. Francis Brooklyn, 71–61, putting an end to the Terriers six-game winning streak. Senior forward Jalen Cannon led the Terriers with 19 points and 13 rebounds and eclipsed the 1,400 point mark for his career. Junior guard Tyreek Jewell added 14 points and senior guard Brent Jones contributed 13 points and a team-high five assists. The Terriers then rebounded against Robert Morris in a nationally televised contest that saw St. Francis come from behind on the road and win 68–63 at the Sewall Center. Senior guard Brent Jones scored 21 of his game-high 23 points in the second half to lead the Terriers to the victory. The Terriers are now 10–8 (4–1 NEC) and Robert Morris fell to 7–10 (3–2 NEC). Senior forward Jalen Cannon led the Terriers with eight rebounds and moved into sixth-place all-time in NEC history with 966 rebounds. St. Francis Brooklyn next traveled to Loretto, Pennsylvania to face the Saint Francis University Red Flash in a first place battle. Chris Hooper put up a buzzer-beating shot with one tenth of a second remaining to give the visiting Terriers a thrilling 60–59 victory. The Terriers were led by Brent Jones (20 Pts, 1 Reb, 2 Ast, 4 Stl) and got a strong performance by Tyreek Jewell (10 Pts, 4 Reb, 1 Stl) and Hooper (11 Pts, 6 Reb). St. Francis Brooklyn then hosted Central Connecticut at Madison Square Garden, where they beat them 63–51. The team was led by the senior duo of Brent Jones (22 Pts, 3 Reb, 6 Ast, 2 Stl) and Jalen Cannon (15 Pts, 6 Reb, 1 Ast, 3 Stl, 1 Blk) with good performances by Tyreek Jewell (14 Pts, 4 Reb, 1 Ast, 1 Stl) and Amdy Fall (6 Pts, 6 Reb, 4 Blk). The Terriers also saw the return of senior swingman Kevin Douglas, who missed the previous 6 games due to injury. In their next match, St. Francis Brooklyn saw an end to their 3-game win streak against Robert Morris at The Pope, losing 65–57. The game saw Brent Jones become the programs all-time assists leader with 536 for his career. The Terriers then faced Mount St. Mary's, who had won 4 straight contests against the Terriers, and defeated them 73–67 in overtime to snap their losing streak against the Mountaineers. They were trailing by three points at the end of the second half when Freshman Guard Glenn Sanabria hit a 3-pointer to tie up the game at 63–63 and force overtime where the Terriers took the lead and sealed the win on a last second block by Junior Forward Amdy Fall. St. Francis Brooklyn was led by Jalen Cannon who scored a career-high 26 points and recorded 13 rebounds to become just the second player in program history and fourth in Northeast Conference history to grab 1,000 rebounds. The St. Francis Brooklyn Terriers next hosted the LIU Brooklyn Blackbirds in the 40th annual Battle of Brooklyn where they won 81–64. Four Terriers scored in double digits, including Brent Jones (15 Pts, 4 Reb, 8 Ast, 1 Stl, 1 Blk) who was named the game's Lai-Lynch MVP. St. Francis finished the month at 8–2 and improved to 14–9 overall for sole possession of first place atop the NEC conference.

==== February ====
The Terriers opened the month with 7 victories and extended their win streak to nine games, their longest of the season. At Central Connecticut, the Terriers won 90–81 matching their season-high point total. St. Francis Brooklyn was led by Jalen Cannon's career-high 35 points and 13 rebounds, which led to him becoming the Terriers' all-time leading rebounder (1,028) surpassing Jerome Williams. He also became just the second player in NEC and first player in program history with at least 1,500 points and 1,000 rebounds. Teammate Brent Jones (14 points, 7 assists) joined the 1,000 point club and became the first player in St. Francis Brooklyn history with 1,000 points and 500 assists. At Wagner, St. Francis Brooklyn won 66–51 behind Jalen Cannon's game-high 29 points. Cannon also became the Northeast Conference all-time leader in rebounds by surpassing Justin Rutty's (Quinnipiac, 2007-2011) previous mark of 1,032 rebounds with a rebound early in the second-half. The Terriers faced the Seahawks again at The Pope and defeated them 83–66, behind another big performance by Jalen Cannon (26 Pts, 12 Reb, 1 Ast, 1 Stl, 1 Blk). St. Francis Brooklyn then hosted Sacred Heart and won 71–62, this time led by Chris Hooper (16 Pts, 6 Reb, 3 Stl, 3 Blk). With the win, the Terriers were in first place with a 3-game lead and 4 games left to play in the season. The Terriers then faced Fairleigh Dickinson at The Pope and won 70–54 behind Jalen Cannon's 27-point performance. The win was not the squads prettiest as they shot 38.5% from the field but the Terriers were able to out-rebound the Knights by 33 caroms. With the win the Terriers are 19–9 and have won 19 of their last 23 outings. St. Francis Brooklyn then clinched the NEC Regular Season Championship with their twentieth win of the season against the Saint Francis Red Flash, 66–54. It is the Terriers third NEC Regular Season Championship and their first since the 2003-04 season, with it they have home court advantage throughout the NEC Tournament. Against the Red Flash, the Terriers were led by the senior duo of Jalen Cannon (23 Pts, 15 Reb, 1 Ast) and Brent Jones (15 Pts, 5 Reb, 4 Ast, 1 Stl), who were honored before the game along with Kevin Douglas and Lowell Ulmer on Senior Night. The Terriers next traveled to LIU Brooklyn and won 74–69 in overtime as they were led by Jalen Cannon (26 Pts, 15 Reb, 2 Stl, 1 Blk) who became the programs all-time leading scorer in his effort. St Francis Brooklyn closed out their regular season at Bryant where they were dealt a 51–61 loss. The team was led by Kevin Douglas (13 Pts, 6 Reb, 1 Blk) and team leader Jalen Cannon only saw 10 minutes of action in the contest. The Terriers closed out the month 7–1, 21–10 overall, and 15–3 in conference play. They will host 8th seed LIU Brooklyn in the NEC Tournament quarterfinals.

== NEC Tournament ==
Prior to the beginning of the conference tournament, the NEC announced Glenn Braica as the Jim Phelan Coach of the Year, Jalen Cannon as the NEC Player of the Year and Amdy Fall as the NEC Defensive Player of the Year. Heading into the tournament the Terriers have a 10–26 all-time record and have appeared in two championships but have yet to win it all. On Wednesday March 4, the Terriers defeated the LIU Brooklyn Blackbirds in the NEC Quarterfinals, 79–70 behind a 31-point performance from senior guard Brent Jones. It marks the programs first NEC Quarterfinals win since the 2002–03 season and their 22nd victory on the year. The Terriers then faced Saint Francis (PA) in the semifinals where they won 62–48 behind Jalen Cannon's 20th double-double of the season (20 Pts, 11 Rebs). With the win, the Terriers tied their program record for victories in a single-season, 23, first set in the 1953–54 season. In the championship game the Terriers lost to Robert Morris, 63–66. The team was led by Tyreek Jewell (19 Pts, 5 Reb, 4 Ast, 1 Stl, 1 Blk) and by Jalen Cannon (10 Pts, 12 Reb, 1 Stl).

== Post-season Tournament ==
By virtue of having won the NEC regular season championship, the Terriers will participate in the National Invitational tournament. It is the programs first NIT postseason appearance since 1963 and they will travel to face top-seeded Richmond in the first round. The Terriers put up a good fight and were down by 2 points with less than 3 minutes to play but they lost 74–84, behind impressive performances from Brent Jones (19 Pts, 4 Reb, 5 Ast) and Chris Hooper (16 Pts, 11 Reb, 1 Ast, 2 Stl).

== Roster ==
2014–15 St. Francis Brooklyn Terriers men's basketball team
Players
Coaches

Pos.	#	Name	Height	Weight	Year	Previous school	Hometown
G	1	Brent Jones	5 ft 10 in (1.78 m)	170 lb (77 kg)	Sr	Bedford Academy High School	Bronx, New York
F	23	Lowell Ulmer	6 ft 5 in (1.96 m)	210 lb (95 kg)	Sr	Staten Island Technical High School	Staten Island, New York
F	5	Jalen Cannon	6 ft 6 in (1.98 m)	230 lb (104 kg)	Sr	William Allen High School	Allentown, Pennsylvania
G/F	34	Kevin Douglas	6 ft 5 in (1.96 m)	210 lb (95 kg)	Sr	Frederick Douglass Academy	Bronx, New York
F	15	Chris Hooper	6 ft 6 in (1.98 m)	230 lb (104 kg)	Jr	Odessa College	Bronx, New York
F/C	32	Amdy Fall	6 ft 6 in (1.98 m)	220 lb (100 kg)	Jr	College of Central Florida	Manhattan, New York
G	30	Edon Molic	6 ft 4 in (1.93 m)	180 lb (82 kg)	Jr	St. Anthony High School	Brooklyn, New York
G/F	0	Tyreek Jewell	6 ft 1 in (1.85 m)	180 lb (82 kg)	Jr	Jamestown Community College	Bronx, New York
G/F	14	Jonathan Doss (redshirt)	6 ft 4 in (1.93 m)	175 lb (79 kg)	Jr	Eastern Wyoming College	Chicago, Illinois
F	3	Antonio Jenifer	6 ft 7 in (2.01 m)	215 lb (98 kg)	Jr	Hagerstown Community College	Hillcrest Heights, Maryland
G	2	Yunus Hopkinson	5 ft 10 in (1.78 m)	175 lb (79 kg)	So	Lee Academy	Manhattan, New York
G	10	Glenn Sanabria	5 ft 11 in (1.8 m)	170 lb (77 kg)	Fr	St. Peter's Boys High School	Staten Island, New York
G/F	4	Gunnar Ólafsson	6 ft 3 in (1.91 m)	195 lb (88 kg)	Fr	Menntaskólinn við Hamrahlíð	Reykjavík, Iceland
F	13	Keon Williams (redshirt)	6 ft 4 in (1.93 m)	175 lb (79 kg)	Fr	John Hardin High School	Atlanta, Georgia
F	21	Marlon Alcindor (redshirt)	6 ft 4 in (1.93 m)	185 lb (84 kg)	Fr	High School for Construction	East Elmhurst, New York

Head coach

- Glenn Braica (Queens College '89)

Assistant coach(es)

- Clive Bentick (Canisius '01)
- Ron Ganulin (LIU '68)
- Jamaal Womack (St. Francis '09)

Legend

- (C) Team captain
- (S) Suspended
- (I) Ineligible
- (W) Walk-on
- Injured
- Current redshirt

Roster
Last update: July 20, 2014

== Schedule and results ==
Date time, TV	Opponent	Result	Record	High points	High rebounds	High assists	Site (attendance) city, state
Non-conference regular season
November 15, 2014*; 12:00 pm, MSG	at Georgetown	L 62–83	0–1	13 – Jones	8 – Douglas	6 – Jones	Verizon Center (7,854); Washington, DC
November 19, 2014*; 7:00 pm	Army; Homecoming	L 71–74	0–2	15 – Cannon	10 – Cannon	6 – Jones	Generoso Pope Athletic Complex (768); Brooklyn, NY
November 23, 2014*; 5:00 pm, BTN	at Rutgers; Barclays Center Classic	L 73–76	0–3	15 – Douglas	7 – Hooper, Douglas	4 – Jones	Louis Brown Athletic Center (4,117); Piscataway, NJ
November 25, 2014*; 7:00pm	at LaSalle; Barclays Center Classic	L 60–73	0–4	13 – Jones	13 – Cannon	3 – Jones	Tom Gola Arena (1,239); Philadelphia, PA
November 28, 2014*; 5:00pm	vs. Norfolk State; Barclays Center Classic; Campus Bracket Opening Round	L 70–72 ^{OT}	0–5	23 – Cannon	9 – Cannon	5 – Jones	Yanitelli Center (N/A); Jersey City, NJ
November 29, 2014*; 5:00pm	vs. Tennessee State; Barclays Center Classic; Campus Bracket Consolation Game	W 59–57	1–5	15 – Cannon	14 – Cannon	3 – Hooper	Yanitelli Center (321); Jersey City, NJ
December 6, 2014*; 2:00 pm	at Liberty	W 65–54	2–5	16 – Cannon, Jones	10 – Fall	4 – Jones	Vines Center (1,025); Lynchburg, VA
December 9, 2014*; 7:00 pm	at NJIT	L 66–68	2–6	16 – Jones	6 – Fall	3 – Ulmer	Fleisher Center (1,372); Newark, NJ
December 13, 2014*; 2:00 pm	Mount Saint Vincent	W 90–72	3–6	25 – Jones	12 – Cannon	6 – Jones, Sanabria	Generoso Pope Athletic Complex (535); Brooklyn, NY
December 17, 2014*; 4:00 pm	Delaware State	L 64–72	3–7	16 – Cannon	10 – Cannon	9 – Jones	Generoso Pope Athletic Complex (535); Brooklyn, NY
December 20, 2014*; 3:00 pm	Florida Atlantic	W 61–56	4–7	17 – Cannon	10 – Cannon, Hooper	4 – Jones	Generoso Pope Athletic Complex (503); Brooklyn, NY
December 23, 2014*; 7:00 pm	at Monmouth	W 71–46	5–7	16 – Cannon, Jones	13 – Cannon	4 – Jones, Sanabria	Multipurpose Activity Center (985); West Long Branch, NJ
December 30, 2014*; 4:00 pm	Columbia	W 72–64	6–7	19 – Jones	12 – Cannon	5 – Cannon	Generoso Pope Athletic Complex (905); Brooklyn, NY
Northeast Conference Regular Season
January 3, 2015; 3:30 pm	at Sacred Heart	W 73–71	7–7 (1–0)	21 – Cannon	13 – Cannon	7 – Jones	William H. Pitt Center (455); Fairfield, CT
January 5, 2015; 4:00 pm	Bryant	W 63–47	8–7 (2–0)	15 – Jewell	10 – Fall	6 – Jones	Generoso Pope Athletic Complex (389); Brooklyn, NY
January 8, 2015; 7:00 pm	at Fairleigh Dickinson	W 78–69	9–7 (3–0)	19 – Cannon	9 – Cannon	5 – Jones, Sanabria	Rothman Center (682); Hackensack, NJ
January 10, 2015; 2:00 pm	at Mount St. Mary's	L 61–71	9–8 (3–1)	19 – Cannon	13 – Cannon	5 – Jones	Knott Arena (881); Emmitsburg, MD
January 16, 2015; 9:00 pm, ESPNU	at Robert Morris	W 68–63	10–8 (4–1)	23 – Jones	8 – Cannon	6 – Jones	Charles L. Sewall Center (2,349); Moon Township, PA
January 18, 2015; 2:00 pm	at Saint Francis (PA)	W 60–59	11–8 (5–1)	20 – Jones	6 – Hooper	2 – Jones, Ulmer	DeGol Arena (1,106); Loretto, PA
January 21, 2015; 9:30 pm	Central Connecticut	W 63–51	12–8 (6–1)	22 – Jones	6 – Cannon, Fall	6 – Jones	Madison Square Garden (7,532); New York, NY
January 24, 2015; 4:00 pm, ESPN3	Robert Morris	L 65–67	12–9 (6–2)	21 – Cannon	16 – Cannon	9 – Jones	Generoso Pope Athletic Complex (605); Brooklyn, NY
January 29, 2015; 7:00 pm	Mount St. Mary's	W 73–67 ^{OT}	13–9 (7–2)	26 – Cannon	13 – Cannon	5 – Jones	Generoso Pope Athletic Complex (465); Brooklyn, NY
January 31, 2015; 4:00 pm, FCS/MSG	LIU Brooklyn; Battle of Brooklyn	W 81–64	14–9 (8–2)	15 – Jones	9 – Cannon	8 – Jones	Generoso Pope Athletic Complex (400); Brooklyn, NY
February 5, 2015; 7:00 pm	at Central Connecticut	W 90–81	15–9 (9–2)	35 – Cannon	13 – Cannon	7 – Jones	William H. Detrick Gymnasium (1,274); New Britain, CT
February 7, 2015; 4:00 pm	at Wagner	W 66–51	16–9 (10–2)	29 – Cannon	11 – Cannon	5 – Jones	Spiro Sports Center (1,876); Staten Island, NY
February 12, 2015; 7:00 pm	Wagner	W 83–66	17–9 (11–2)	26 – Cannon	12 – Cannon	10 – Jones	Generoso Pope Athletic Complex (889); Brooklyn, NY
February 14, 2015; 4:00 pm	Sacred Heart	W 71–62	18–9 (12–2)	16 – Hooper	9 – Cannon	9 – Jones	Generoso Pope Athletic Complex (485); Brooklyn, NY
February 19, 2015; 7:00 pm	Fairleigh Dickinson	W 70–54	19–9 (13–2)	27 – Cannon	15 – Cannon	4 – Jones	Generoso Pope Athletic Complex (670); Brooklyn, NY
February 21, 2015; 4:00 pm	Saint Francis (PA); Senior Night	W 66–54	20–9 (14–2)	23 – Cannon	15 – Cannon	4 – Jones	Generoso Pope Athletic Complex (877); Brooklyn, NY
February 26, 2015; 4:00 pm, FCS/MSG+	at LIU Brooklyn	W 74–69 ^{OT}	21–9 (15–2)	26 – Cannon	15 – Cannon	3 – Jones, Hopkinson	Steinberg Wellness Center (1,527); Brooklyn, NY
February 28, 2015; 4:00 pm	at Bryant	L 51–61	21–10 (15–3)	13 – Douglas	8 – Hooper, Jenifer	2 – Jones	Chace Athletic Center (1,052); Smithfield, RI
Northeast Conference tournament
March 4, 2015; 7:00 pm	(8) LIU Brooklyn; Quarterfinals	W 79–70	22–10	31 – Jones	15 – Cannon	5 – Jones	Generoso Pope Athletic Complex (972); Brooklyn, NY
March 7, 2015; 2:00 pm, FCS/MSG	(5) Saint Francis (PA); Semifinals	W 62–48	23–10	20 – Cannon	11 – Cannon	8 – Jones	Generoso Pope Athletic Complex (954); Brooklyn, NY
March 10, 2015; 7:00 pm, ESPN2	(2) Robert Morris; Championship game	L 63–66	23–11	19 – Jewell	12 – Cannon	5 – Jones	Generoso Pope Athletic Complex (1,013); Brooklyn, NY
National Invitation Tournament
March 18, 2015*; 7:30 pm, ESPN3	at (1) Richmond; First round	L 74–84	23–12	19 – Jones	12 – Cannon	5 – Jones	Robins Center (3,624); Richmond, VA
*Non-conference game. ^{#}Rankings from AP Poll. (#) Tournament seedings in parentheses. All times are in Eastern Time. (#) during NIT is seed within region.

== Season statistics ==
Individual Player Statistics (As of February 11, 2015)
			Minutes		Scoring		Total FGs			3-point FGs			Free-Throws			Rebounds							
Player	GP	GS	Tot	Avg	Pts	Avg	FG	FGA	Pct	3FG	3FA	Pct	FT	FTA	Pct	Off	Def	Tot	Avg	A	TO	Blk	Stl
Cannon, Jalen	35	35	1184	33.8	564	16.1	210	404	.520	27	81	.333	117	168	.696	139	228	367	10.5	34	58	27	24
Jones, Brent	35	35	1188	33.9	493	14.1	157	396	.396	50	152	.329	129	167	.772	28	91	119	3.4	184	120	3	66
Jewell, Tyreek	35	34	1023	29.2	327	9.3	123	358	.344	29	145	.200	52	83	.627	44	84	128	3.7	39	47	7	25
Fall, Amdy	29	7	676	23.3	188	6.5	56	116	.483	0	0	.000	76	108	.704	55	89	144	5.0	19	38	80	22
Sanabria, Glenn	28	0	633	22.6	169	6.0	49	117	.419	31	69	.449	40	60	.667	23	31	54	1.9	58	31	4	20
Douglas, Kevin	26	11	399	15.3	132	5.1	46	109	.422	14	46	.304	26	39	.667	30	57	87	3.3	13	25	11	11
Hooper, Chris	35	28	500	14.3	198	5.7	76	147	.517	0	0	.000	46	79	.582	66	81	147	4.2	26	41	16	19
Jenifer, Antonio	32	0	327	10.2	121	3.8	45	129	.349	16	47	.340	15	31	.484	37	53	90	2.8	8	21	11	7
Ulmer, Lowell	35	21	542	15.5	109	3.1	38	91	.418	7	23	.304	26	47	.553	35	39	74	2.1	28	28	10	22
Hopkinson, Yunus	27	0	286	10.6	69	2.6	21	85	.247	9	52	.173	18	21	.857	2	15	17	0.6	18	17	0	10
Ólafsson, Gunnar	28	4	311	11.1	45	1.6	15	48	.313	11	42	.262	4	6	.667	10	23	33	1.2	4	17	3	6
Molic, Edon	6	0	7	1.2	3	0.5	1	5	.200	1	5	.200	0	0	.000	0	0	0	0.0	0	1	0	0
Team																52	49	101	2.9		15		
Total	35		7076		2418	69.1	837	2005	0.417	195	662	0.295	549	809	0.679	521	840	1361	38.9	431	459	172	232
Opponents	35		7075		2262	64.6	783	1839	0.426	179	487	0.368	517	740	0.699	337	789	1126	32.2	374	471	105	221

Legend
GP	Games played	GS	Games started	Avg	Average per game
FG	Field-goals made	FGA	Field-goal attempts	Off	Offensive rebounds
Def	Defensive rebounds	A	Assists	TO	Turnovers
Blk	Blocks	Stl	Steals	High	Team high

== Awards and honors ==
Glenn Braica

- Named the 2015 NEC Jim Phelan Coach of the Year
- Named the 2015 Peter J. Carlesimo Co-Coach of the Year

Jalen Cannon

- Selected to the 2014–15 Preseason All-NEC Team by NEC Coaches Poll.
- Named to the Barclays Classic All-Tournament Team.
- NEC men's basketball Player of the Week award (November 24–30, 2014). Cannon posted a pair of double-doubles and averaged 16.3 points, 12.0 rebounds and 1.7 steals in St. Francis Brooklyn's three contests against LaSalle, Norfolk State, and Tennessee State.
- NEC men's basketball Player of the Week award (December 22–28, 2014). Against Monmouth Cannon posted his fourth double-double in a row with 16 points and 13 rebounds.
- NEC men's basketball Player of the Week award (December 29, 2014 – January 4, 2015). Cannon's NEC-best third Player of the Week nod comes after a 3–0 week for the Terriers. He averaged 14.7 points, 11.0 rebounds, 2.3 assists, 1.7 blocks and shot 50.0 percent from the field for St. Francis Brooklyn in those 3 contests.
- NEC men's basketball Player of the Week award (February 2, 2015 – February 8, 2015). Cannon averaged 32.0 ppg, 12.0 rpg and 2.0 apg in two wins, while shooting 67.6 percent from the field and 62.5 percent (5-8) from long distance in the best two-game scoring stretch of his career.
- Lou Henson Award National Player of the Week honors (February 2, 2015 – February 8, 2015).
- Metropolitan Writers Association Player of the Week (February 2, 2015 – February 8, 2015).
- NEC men's basketball Player of the Week award (February 16–22, 2015). Cannon averaged 25.0 points and 15.0 rebounds, while shooting 61.3 percent from the floor and a perfect 11–11 from the line as the Terriers clinched their first NEC regular season championship since the 2003–04 season.
- Selected to the 2014–15 NEC men's basketball All-Conference first team.
- 2014–15 NEC Player of the Year.
- Selected to the NEC All-Tournament Team.
- Selected to the All-Met Division I First Team.
- AP Honorable mention All-American.

Brent Jones

- NEC men's basketball Player of the Week award (January 12–18, 2015). He averaged 21.5 points, 2.5 rebounds, 4.0 assists and 3.0 steals, while converting at a 60.0 percent rate from the field and 54.5 percent clip (6-11) from long distance against Robert Morris and Saint Francis University.
- Madness Mid-Major Northeast Conference Players of the Week award (January 12–18, 2015).
- Selected to the 2014–15 NEC men's basketball All-Conference first team.
- Selected to the NEC All-Tournament Team.
- Selected to the All-Met Division I Third Team.

Amdy Fall

- 2014–15 NEC Defensive Player of the Year.
- 8th in country with 3.0 blocks per game

== Program and Conference All-Time records ==
Jalen Cannon

- All-time leader in made free throws with 342 (vs Monmouth on December 23, 2014).
- Second player in program history and fourth in Northeast Conference history to record 1,000 rebounds (vs Mount St. Mary's on January 29, 2015).
- Exceeded 1,500 career points and became the first player in program history and second in Northeast Conference history to record 1,500 points and 1,000 rebounds (vs Central Connecticut on February 5, 2015).
- All-time rebounds leader in program history with 1,019 (vs Central Connecticut on February 5, 2015).
- All-time rebounds leader in Northeast Conference history with 1,033 (vs Wagner on February 7, 2015).
- All-time scoring leader in program history with 1,663 (vs LIU Brooklyn on February 26, 2015)

Brent Jones

- Second player in program history to record 500 points and 500 assists (vs Bryant on January 5, 2015).
- All-time assists leader in program history with 535 (vs Robert Morris on January 24, 2015)
- Exceeded 1,000 career points and became the first player in program history to record 1,000 points and 500 assists (vs Central Connecticut on February 5, 2015).

== See also ==
- 2014–15 St. Francis Brooklyn Terriers women's basketball team
