= JHHS =

JHHS may refer to:

- John Handley High School
- John Hardin High School
- John Hersey High School
- Jonesboro-Hodge High School
- Jackson Hole High School
