= Daði Lár Jónsson =

Icelandic basketball player

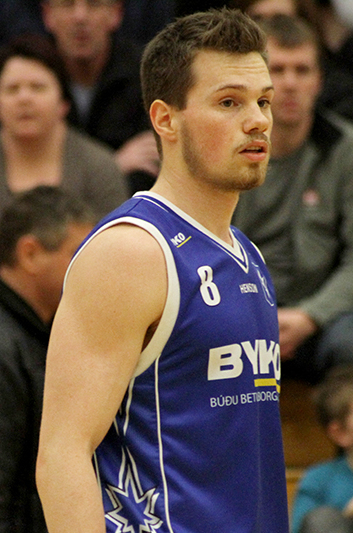
- Daði Lár in 2015.

Personal information
- Born: 23 October 1996 (age 30)
- Listed height: 182 cm (6 ft 0 in)

Career information
- Playing career: 2010–2019; 2022–present
- Position: Guard

Career history
- 2010: Stjarnan-b
- 2012–2016: Stjarnan
- 2016–2018: Keflavík
- 2018–2019: Haukar
- 2022–2023: Valur
- 2023–2024: Haukar
- 2024–2025: Álftanes

Career highlights
- 3× Icelandic Cup winner (2013, 2015, 2023); Icelandic Company Cup (2015); Icelandic Super Cup (2023)

Daði Lár Jónsson (born 23 October 1996) is an Icelandic basketball player and former sprinter. During his basketball career, he won the Icelandic Basketball Cup twice as a member of Stjarnan and once with Valur.

== Basketball career ==
Daði came up through the junior programs of Stjarnan. In January 2016, he moved over to Keflavík, where his father had starred. He left the club in July 2018. In August 2018, he signed with Haukar. For the 2018–19 season, he averaged 8.4 points and team leading 3.8 assists.

On 24 September 2023, he won the Icelandic Super Cup after Valur defeated Tindastóll 80–72.

After starting the 2023–2024 season with Valur, Daði signed with Haukar in November 2023.

== Personal life ==
Daði's father, Jón Kr. Gíslason, played 158 games for the Icelandic national team between 1982 and 1995 and coached the national team from 1995 to 1999. Daði's brothers, Dagur Kár Jónsson and Dúi Þór Jónsson, have also played in the Úrvalsdeild karla.
