= Glenn Braica =

American basketball player and coach

Current position
- Title: Assistant coach
- Team: Fairfield
- Conference: MAAC

Biographical details
- Born: September 16, 1964 (age 62); Brooklyn, New York, U.S.

Playing career
- 1984–1988: Queens
- Position: Point guard / shooting guard

Coaching career (HC unless noted)
- 1988–1989: New York City Tech (assistant)
- 1989–2004: St. Francis (NY) (assistant)
- 2004–2010: St. John's (assistant)
- 2010–2023: St. Francis (NY)
- 2023–present: Fairfield (assistant)

Head coaching record
- Overall: 177–216 (.450)
- Tournaments: 0–1 (NIT); 0–1 (CIT)

Accomplishments and honors

Championships
- NEC regular season (2015)

Awards
- Peter J. Carlesimo Coach of the Year (2015); 2× NEC Coach of the Year (2012, 2015)

Glenn Braica (born September 16, 1964) is an American college basketball coach, currently an assistant coach at Fairfield University. He was previously the head coach at St. Francis College from 2010 until the program was cut in 2023. Braica was born in Brooklyn, New York and is an alumnus of Bishop Ford High School and Queens College. Braica began his head coaching career at St. Francis College in 2010 and had 22 years of coaching experience at the time split between New York City Tech, St. Francis and St. John's as an assistant coach.

== Biography ==
Braica attended St. Agnes High School from 1980 to 1982 and Bishop Ford in Brooklyn from 1982 to 1984. Braica went on to Queens College and played for the Knights from 1984 to 1988 as a point guard. At Queens College, Braica met Norm Roberts and became great friends; that would later lead to Roberts hiring Braica as his assistant at St. John's University. Prior to St. Johns's, Braica was an assistant coach for Ron Ganulin at St. Francis College, where in Braica's last seven years, the Terriers posted a 118–83 record, including an 88–42 mark in the Northeast Conference.

Other notable accomplishments during Braica's tenure as an assistant at St. Francis include finishing with a .500 or better record in the league seven straight years, at that time the longest active streak in the league. They also reached the NEC semi-finals five times and had two championship game appearances in Braica's last five seasons. While at St. John's, Braica helped lead the Red Storm to two NIT bids as an assistant coach.

== St. Francis Brooklyn Terriers ==
On April 29, 2010, Glenn Braica was announced as the 17th head coach in the history of the St. Francis Terriers men's basketball program. He replaced Brian Nash, who resigned for personal reasons on April 7, 2010. In Braica's first season as head coach, the Terriers qualified for the NEC tournament as the 5th seed. They then lost in the first round of the NEC tournament to Central Connecticut State 62–64. Under Braica, Akeem Bennett became the first Terrier selected to the NBA D-League. In Braica's first year, the Terriers increased their scoring by more than six points per game from the previous season and were one of the best teams in the country in taking care of the basketball, averaging a conference-low 13.3 turnovers per game. The team also led the NEC with 7.80 steals per game.

In his second season, Braica led the Terriers to their second NEC tournament with the 4th seed. They went 12–6 in the NEC, their most wins since the 2003–04 season and they hosted their first home tournament game since 1997, a 72–80 loss to Quinnipiac. Additionally, Braica was selected as the 2012 NEC Jim Phelan coach of the year and as the 2012 NABC District 18 Co-Coach of the Year.

For the 2012–13 season, Braica's team went 12–18 overall and 8–11 in conference play. They finished 8th, well below where they were expected to finish in the NEC coach's preseason poll (4th) but qualified for the NEC tournament. In the 2013 NEC Tournament the Terriers again lost in the first round, this time to Robert Morris 75–57.

For the 2013–14 season campaign, Braica was able to guide his Terriers to a 9–6 non-conference record which was one win shy of being the first NEC team to win 10 non-conference games in a season. Part of this success was the Terriers stingy defense and big road wins against Miami, Florida Atlantic and Stony Brook. The Terriers also participated in the 2013 Maui Invitational tournament as part of the Mainland Bracket for the first time in the programs history. The Terriers produced a 1–1 record and won the consolation game of the Mainland bracket against Oakland. The Terriers finished the season at 18–13 and qualified for the NEC Tournament with the 5th seed yet lost at Mount St. Mary's 71–72. Their 18 wins are the most since the 2001–2002 season and they led the NEC in scoring defense (66.7) and rebounding margin (+3.3). After the end of the season Braica was announced as a finalist for the 2014 Skip Prosser Man of the Year Award.

The Terriers for the first time in the programs history as members of the NEC, were selected as the preseason 2014–15 NEC favorites by league head coaches. The program was also selected to participate in the 3rd annual 2014 Barclays Center Classic and faced Rutgers, LaSalle, Norfolk State and Tennessee State. The Terriers went 1–3, winning the consolation game of the Campus Site Bracket. St. Francis Brooklyn ended the non-conference portion of their schedule at 6–7, which is impressive considering they opened the season with a five-game losing streak. On January 31, 2015, the Terriers gained sole possession of 1st place in the NEC after defeating LIU Brooklyn in the annual Battle of Brooklyn. For St. Francis Brooklyn, it marks the first time they have been in first place after 10 games since starting 8–2 in the 2003–04 season. That year the Terriers finished 12–6 and shared the NEC regular season title with Monmouth. On February 21, 2015, the Terriers clinched the NEC Regular Season Championship and recorded their first 20+ win season since the 1998–99 season. The Terriers closed out their regular reason season at 21-10 overall and 15–3 in conference play. At the end of the season Braica was awarded with his second NEC Jim Phelan coach of the year award. Braica then led his team to the NEC Tournament Championship game by defeating LIU Brooklyn and Saint Francis (PA), but lost to Robert Morris in the finals. It represents the closest the program has come to making the NCAA tournament since the 2002-03 season. By virtue of being the Regular Season Champions, the Terriers were selected for the 2015 NIT, the programs first post-season tournament in 52 years. Braica's squad lost in the first round to Richmond but up a fight and were within 4 points with 2 minutes on the clock. The Terriers ended their season at 23–12 overall, tying the programs record for wins in a season last set in 1953–54.

Coach Braica huddling with his team on December 10, 2015, against NJIT at The Pope.

For the 2015–16 season, Braica's team went 15–17 overall and 11–7 in conference play. They finished tied for second place and qualified for the NEC tournament. In the 2016 NEC tournament the Terriers lost in the first round to Mount St. Mary's 51–60. Briaca lost four key players to graduation (Jalen Cannon, Brent Jones, Lowell Ulmer and Kevin Douglas) and lost his starting point guard (Glenn Sanabria) to injury yet was able to finish with a second-place finish in conference play and qualify for his 6th consecutive NEC Tournament.

In Braica's seventh season the Terriers had their worst record since the 1993–94 season, when the Terriers finished ranked 10th in the NEC. It also represents the second consecutive losing season for the Terriers and the first season in Braica's tenure that the Terriers missed the NEC postseason. In the 2018–19 season, the Terriers posted a winning record (17–15) and although they were eliminated in the opening round of the 2019 NEC tournament, they were selected to participate in the 2019 CollegeInsider.com Postseason Tournament. It was the first time the Terriers had been selected to participate in the CIT.

With the termination of intercollegiate athletics at St. Francis, the 2022–23 season would be the last for the men's basketball program. Braica's final record was 177–216, making him the 3rd-winningest coach in the program's history while ranking 2nd in losses.

== Head coaching record ==
Record table
Season	Team	Overall	Conference	Standing	Postseason
St. Francis Brooklyn Terriers (Northeast Conference) (2010–2023)
2010–11	St. Francis (NY)	15–15	10–8	5th	
2011–12	St. Francis (NY)	15–15	12–6	4th	
2012–13	St. Francis Brooklyn	12–18	8–10	8th	
2013–14	St. Francis Brooklyn	18–14	9–7	T–4th	
2014–15	St. Francis Brooklyn	23–12	15–3	1st	NIT First Round
2015–16	St. Francis Brooklyn	15–17	11–7	T–2nd	
2016–17	St. Francis Brooklyn	4–27	2–16	10th	
2017–18	St. Francis Brooklyn	13–18	10–8	T–4th	
2018–19	St. Francis Brooklyn	17–16	9–9	T–5th	CIT First Round
2019–20	St. Francis Brooklyn	13–18	7–11	T–7th	
2020–21	St. Francis Brooklyn	9–10	9–9	T–5th	
2021–22	St. Francis Brooklyn	10–20	7–11	6th	
2022–23	St. Francis Brooklyn	14–16	7–9	T–7th	
St. Francis Brooklyn:		177–216 (.450)	115–114 (.502)		
Total:		177–216 (.450)			
National champion Postseason invitational champion Conference regular season champion Conference regular season and conference tournament champion Division regular season champion Division regular season and conference tournament champion Conference tournament champion
