= Dagur Kár Jónsson =

Icelandic basketball player

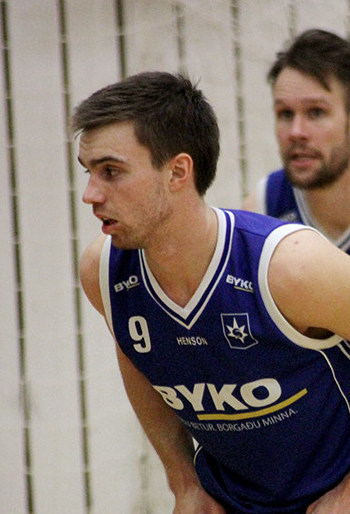
- Dagur Kár with Stjarnan in 2015

Personal information
- Born: 15 February 1995 (age 31) Iceland
- Listed height: 185 cm (6 ft 1 in)
- Listed weight: 75 lb (34 kg)

Career information
- College: St. Francis Brooklyn (2015–2016)
- Playing career: 2010–2024
- Position: Point guard
- Number: 1, 4, 9

Career history
- 2010–2015: Stjarnan
- 2016–2018: Grindavík
- 2018–2019: Flyers Wels
- 2019–2021: Grindavík
- 2021–2022: Ourense
- 2022–2023: KR
- 2023–2024: Stjarnan

Career highlights
- 2× Icelandic Basketball Cup winner (2013, 2015)
Medals
Men's basketball
Representing Iceland
Games of the Small States of Europe
Bronze medal – third place	2019 Montenegro	Team

Dagur Kár Jónsson (born 15 February 1995) is an Icelandic former basketball player. A 185 cm point guard, he won the Icelandic Basketball Cup in 2013 and 2015 as a member of Stjarnan. In 2019, he debuted for the Icelandic national team.

== College ==
Dagur Kár played the 2015–16 season with St. Francis College where he averaged 4.6 points and 1.3 assists in 18.2 minutes per game. He left the school in October 2016.

== Playing career ==
During the 2014-15 season, Dagur Kár averaged 17.6 points and 3.6 assists. He was named to the Úrvalsdeild All-First team for the first half of the season. After the season, he joined St. Francis.

On 28 October 2016 Dagur Kár signed with Úrvalsdeild karla club Grindavík. In 2017, he resigned with Grindavík.

For the 2017–18 season, Dagur Kár averaged 16.6 points and 6.7 assists but Grindavík was knocked out in the first round of the playoffs.

On 20 April 2018 he exercised an escape clause in his contract and left Grindavík to sign back with his hometown club of Stjarnan, much to the dismay of Grindavík's board as they claimed that he had stated to them that he would stay at the club for next season. In July 2018, it was reported that he had signed with Raiffeisen Flyers Wels of the Österreichische Basketball Bundesliga. In his contract with Stjarnan was a clause allowing him to sign with a bigger club. He helped the Flyer Wels finish fifth in the league and reach the playoffs where it fell out in the first round. For the season he averaged 10.5 points and 3.0 assists in 36 games.

On 28 August 2019, Dagur Kár returned to Grindavík, signing a 2-year contract. In November 2019, he underwent a surgery and was expected to miss 6–8 weeks. Two days later, doctors discovered an infection in the knee, derailing his recovery.

In October 2021, Dagur signed with Club Ourense Baloncesto of the LEB Plata. He left the team in January 2022 after being diagnosed with myocarditis. In 13 games with Ourense, he averaged 10.2 points and 2.3 assists.

On 2 May 2022, Dagur Kár returned to the Úrvalsdeild and signed with KR. In January 2023, he left KR en joined Stjarnan. In March 2023, he underwent a season ending knee surgery.

In October 2024, Dagur announced his retirement from basketball due to lingering injuries.

== Personal life ==
Dagur's father, Jón Kr. Gíslason, played 158 games for the Icelandic national team between 1982 and 1995 and coached the national team from 1995 to 1999. Dagur's brothers, Daði Lár Jónsson and Dúi Þór Jónsson, have also played in the Úrvalsdeild karla.
