= Chris Hooper (basketball) =

American basketball player (born 1991)

No. 1 – San Isidro
- Position: Power forward / small forward
- League: La Liga Argentina

Personal information
- Born: December 24, 1991 (age 34) Harlem, New York, U.S.
- Listed height: 6 ft 6 in (1.98 m)
- Listed weight: 235 lb (107 kg)

Career information
- High school: Arturo A. Schomburg Satellite Academy (Bronx, New York)
- College: Kaskaskia (2012–2013); Odessa (2013–2014); St. Francis Brooklyn (2014–2016)
- NBA draft: 2016: undrafted
- Playing career: 2016–present

Career history
- 2016–2017: Reading Rockets
- 2017–2019: Oberá Tenis Club
- 2019–2022: Itzehoe Eagles
- 2022–present: San Isidro Falcones

Career highlights
- 2× Third-team All-NEC (2015, 2016)

Chris Hooper (born December 24, 1991) is an American basketball player from Harlem, New York playing in the La Liga Argentina League.

== Early life ==
Hooper attended Arturo A. Schomburg Satellite Academy in the Bronx. During his senior year at Satellite Academy, he averaged 12.3 points and 11.3 rebounds. After graduating from high school, he played one season at both Kaskaskia College in Illinois and at Odessa College in Texas. While at Kaskaskia, Hooper averaged 11.7 points and 9.0 rebounds per game and helped lead the squad to a 20–11 record. At Odessa, he contributed 6.9 points and 5.8 rebounds per game.

Hooper then transferred to St. Francis College in Brooklyn, New York, where he had two years remaining of eligibility. With the St. Francis Brooklyn Terriers, he helped win a regular-season NEC Championship and participated in the National Invitation Tournament. In his first season with the Terriers, Hooper started 28 games and averaged 5.7 points per games and 4.2 rebounds per game. In his senior year, Hooper raised his statistics by averaging 11.5 points per game and 5.0 rebounds per game. Additionally, Hooper converted 59.1 percent of his shot opportunities to rank fourth in the NEC and was selected to the 2015–16 NEC men's basketball All-Conference third team.

=== Statistics ===
Chris Hooper Statistics at St. Francis Brooklyn (As of March 20, 2016)
			Minutes		Scoring		Total FGs			3-point FGs			Free-Throws			Rebounds							
Season	GP	GS	Tot	Avg	Pts	Avg	FG	FGA	Pct	3FG	3FA	Pct	FT	FTA	Pct	Off	Def	Tot	Avg	A	TO	Blk	Stl
2014–15	35	28	500	14.3	198	5.7	76	147	.517	0	0	.000	46	79	.582	66	81	147	4.2	26	41	16	19
2015–16	31	10	656	21.2	356	11.5	139	235	.591	0	2	.000	78	137	.569	59	96	155	5.0	43	75	38	33
Total	66	38	1156	17.5	554	8.4	215	382	.563	0	2	.000	124	216	.574	125	177	302	4.6	69	116	54	52

Legend
GP	Games played	GS	Games started	Avg	Average per game
FG	Field-goals made	FGA	Field-goal attempts	Off	Offensive rebounds
Def	Defensive rebounds	A	Assists	TO	Turnovers
Blk	Blocks	Stl	Steals	High	Team high

== Professional career ==
After graduating from St. Francis College, Hooper agreed with M.A.C. Sports Management & Consulting to represent him as he looked to Europe for a team to sign with. On July 22, 2016, he signed his first professional contract with the Reading Rockets of the English Basketball League. On September 17, 2016, Hooper played in his first professional game for the Reading Rockets as they lost to the Worthing Thunder, 71–78, in a Men's National Trophy Game. Hooper led his team in scoring with 22 points. In his second professional game, Hooper again lead his team in scoring with 26 points, and recorded 8 rebounds with 3 steals.

After his first full season, Hooper was selected as the Eurobasket.com All-British NBL Division One League Player of the Year by Eurobasket.com. He was also selected as the Center of the Year and the Import of the Year. Hooper averaged 22.4 points and 12.3 rebounds per game, and led the Reading Rockets (United Kingdom) to a 27–10 record in his debut season.
