= Queens High School of Teaching =

Public school in New York City

The Queens High School of Teaching, Liberal Arts and the Sciences
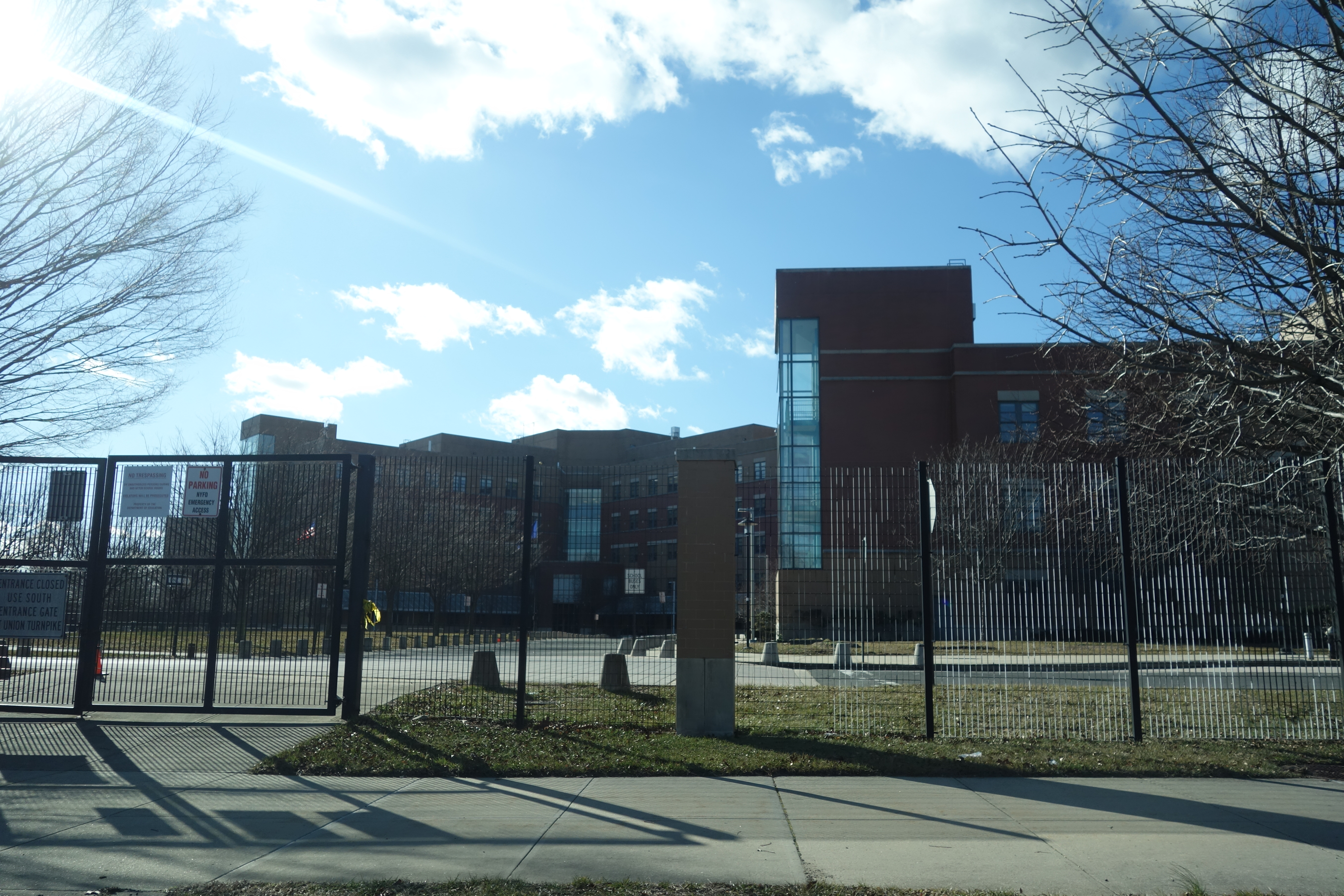
- Queens High School of Teaching (Center Building) in January 2021.

Location
- 74-20 Commonwealth Boulevard; Queens, New York 11426; United States; 40°44′40″N 73°43′44″W

Information
- Other name: QHST
- School type: Public high school
- Motto: "Different By Design"
- Established: 2003
- Founder: Nigel Pugh
- Status: Open
- School district: Community School District 26 (NYC Department of Education)
- Superintendent: Elaine Lindsey
- School number: Q566
- School code: 26Q566
- CEEB code: 331936
- Principal: Camille Gardener
- Grades: 9–12
- Enrollment: 1190 (2018-2019)
- Campus: Frank A. Padavan Campus
- Colors: Red and Black
- Athletics conference: PSAL
- Mascot: Tiger
- Admission: Ed. Opt.
- Website: queenshsofteaching.org

The Queens High School of Teaching, Liberal Arts and the Sciences (QHST) (26Q566) is a public high school in Glen Oaks, New York, United States. It is located on the Frank A. Padavan Campus, a 32-acre (130,000 m^{2}) landscaped campus, which contains QHST and two other neighboring kindergarten-8th grade schools: P.S./I.S. 266 and P.S./I.S. 208. It is one of the only schools in New York City that has a campus. The campus—originally named the Glen Oaks Campus—was renamed in 2008 in honor of a state senator who at the time was running for re-election.

The school opened in the fall of 2003. It currently serves grades 9-12.

== History and origin ==
The school was originally planned as a year-round school with short vacations throughout the year, but this plan was later dismissed, and the school now adheres to a standard academic schedule.

The original plan was to enroll 300 freshmen and gradually accept more students each year. Months before its opening, 60 sophomores were admitted as well. At this time Principal Nigel Pugh separated the school into three "small learning communities" (SLCs) to simulate the experience of attending a smaller school.

The campus was originally the site of an extension of Creedmoor Psychiatric Center, to which the school has no affiliation. During the 2009–2010 school year, the last few buildings were torn down for a sports field.

On 2 April 2016, the School officially opened the athletic field.

== Small Learning Communities ==
The school used to use a Small Learning Communities model. They were named : Emerson, Freire, and Montessori. Each had its own teachers, and students mostly attend classes only within their small learning community. Some classes – e.g. art, music, Spanish culture, Spanish - were "cross-community", meaning that students from different communities attend the same class. Montessori and Emerson were once the two biggest communities, having few seniors and an average number of juniors, sophomores, and freshmen, while Freire only had juniors, sophomores and freshmen. This has since changed. This model was gradually changed to a more traditional model.

== Notable alumni ==
- Ella Mai - English singer and songwriter
- Indira Scott - Fashion model
