= Jalen Cannon =

American basketball player (born 1993)

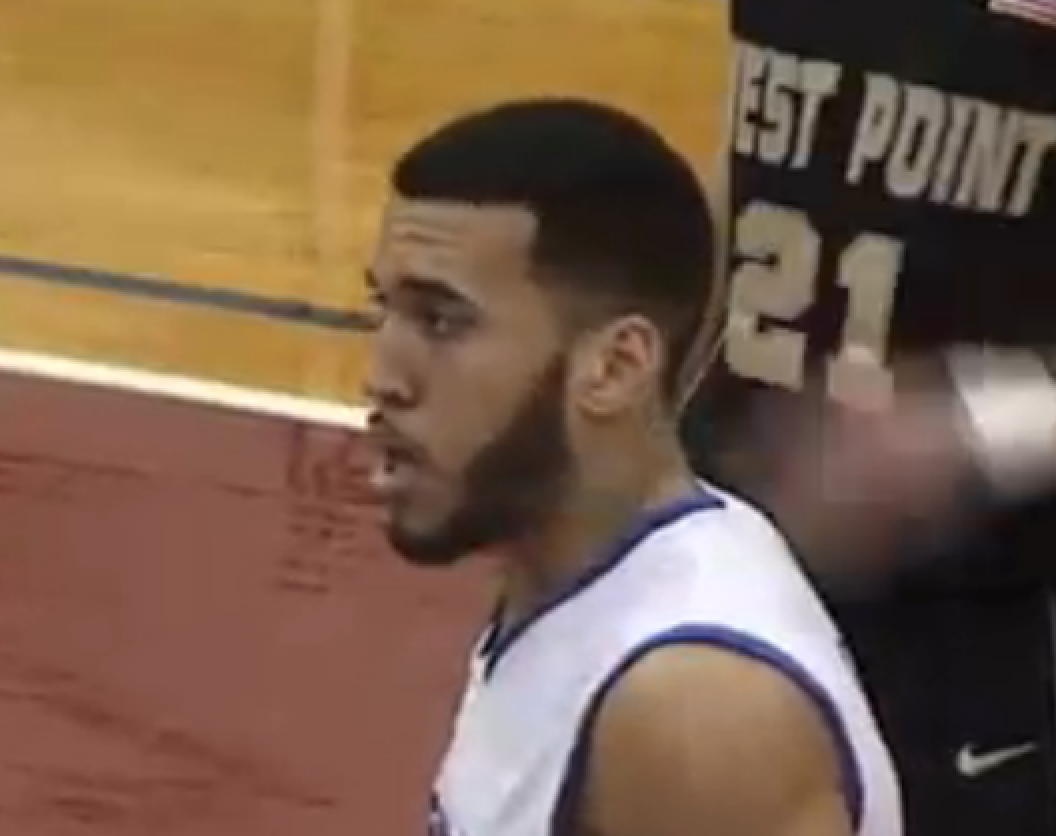
- Cannon playing for St. Francis Brooklyn in 2014

Free agent
- Position: Power forward / center

Personal information
- Born: May 5, 1993 (age 33) Allentown, Pennsylvania, U.S.
- Listed height: 1.98 m (6 ft 6 in)
- Listed weight: 109 kg (240 lb)

Career information
- High school: William Allen (Allentown, Pennsylvania)
- College: St. Francis Brooklyn (2011–2015)
- NBA draft: 2015: undrafted
- Playing career: 2015–present

Career history
- 2015–2016: Jefes de Fuerza Lagunera
- 2016–2017: Hapoel Afula B.C.
- 2017–2019: Fortitudo Agrigento
- 2019–2020: N.P.C. Rieti
- 2020–2022: Derthona Basket
- 2022–2023: Vanoli Cremona

Career highlights
- NEC Player of the Year (2015); AP Honorable mention All-American (2015); 2× First-team All-NEC (2014, 2015); Second-team All-NEC (2013); NEC All-Rookie Team (2012)

Jalen Cannon (born May 5, 1993) is an American basketball player who last played for Vanoli Cremona of the Italian Serie A2. Cannon is in his seventh season as a professional and second with Derthona Basket.

During his collegiate career at St. Francis Brooklyn, Cannon was selected as the unanimous NEC Player of the Year in 2015. Cannon recorded over 1,500 points and 1,000 rebounds, making him the first player in program history and the second player in Northeast Conference history to accomplish the feat. Cannon also holds the St. Francis Brooklyn records for all-time points and in addition the NEC all-time rebounds record. In his senior year (2014–15) Cannon was second amongst all active NCAA Division I players with 48 career double-doubles and was the active rebound leader in Division I. He has also helped lead the Terriers to a 68–59 overall record, 44–26 conference record, four NEC Tournament appearances and the program's first NEC regular season championship in 11 years. The 2014–15 Terriers with Cannon, also participated in their first NEC Tournament Championship in 12 years and participated in their first postseason NIT in 52 years.

In 2019, Cannon was selected to the Northeast Conference Team of the Decade.

== High school career ==
Cannon attended William Allen High School in Allentown, Pennsylvania and played under head coach Douglas Snyder for the Canaries. Early on in Cannon's high school career he played sparingly on his high school's junior varsity squad freshman year and only logged 2 points his sophomore year on the varsity squad. However, Cannon had outstanding junior and senior years and he was elected to the PIAA 4A all-state second team after averaging 19.6 points per game, 10.3 rebounds per game and 1.5 blocks per game as a senior. He was also elected The Morning Call (Lehigh Valley) Co-Player of the Year along with future Villanova player Darrun Hilliard. Cannon's squad went 23–5 in his senior year and won the District 11 4A Championship game, a game in which he recorded 22 points and 20 rebounds.

Although Cannon improved his skills in his final two years at William Allen, he wasn't highly recruited and was considered undersized for a power forward. St. Francis Brooklyn was the only college that offered Cannon a scholarship and that was due in large part to former Terriers assistant coach Andy Johnston, who saw potential in him.

== Collegiate career ==
Cannon officially signed with St. Francis on December 16, 2010, and was an immediate impact player for then second year head coach Glenn Braica. He played in all 30 games his freshman year and averaged 8.0 PPG and 8.8 RPG. One particular stand-out game his freshman year came against Fairleigh Dickinson on February 25, 2012, when he grabbed a Northeast Conference high 20 rebounds, it was the most by a Division I freshman in the entire country that season. At the end of his freshman season, Cannon was named to the NEC All Rookie Team. He was also the second-leading freshmen rebounder in the country at 8.8 RPG and finished tied for 53rd overall.

During Cannon's second season at St. Francis Brooklyn he started every game and was the team's leading scorer and rebounder. In what was considered a disappointing season for the Terriers, the first losing season under coach Glenn Braica, Cannon was a bright spot. His leadership and impact were exemplified when after a five-game losing streak, Cannon led his team to 2 consecutive victories against Colgate and NJIT by averaging 23.5 points and 9.0 rebounds. His efforts were rewarded with his first career NEC Player of the Week award. At the end of his sophomore year, Cannon finished second in the league in rebounding (8.9 RPG), 5th in field goal percentage (.556) and tied for ninth in scoring (14.7 PPG). He also tied for second in the conference with 10 double-doubles and was 53rd in the NCAA in rebounding for the second straight season. For his efforts Cannon was named to the Second Team All-NEC squad.

For his junior year, Cannon was selected to the 2013–14 Preseason All-NEC Team by NEC Coaches. He recorded his 1,000th point on January 23, 2014, against Fairleigh Dickinson in a 23-point, 11-rebound performance. Cannon finished seventh in the NEC in scoring (14.9 PPG), led the league in rebounding (8.2 RPG) and tied for third in double-doubles with 9. After the season, he was named to the First Team All-NEC squad.

For the 2014–15 season, Cannon was once again selected to the Preseason All-NEC Team by NEC coaches. During his senior season, Cannon became the all-time leader in points scored for St. Francis Brooklyn, in addition he became the first Terrier to recorded over 1,500 points and 1,000 rebounds. His rebound total also made him the all-time NEC leader. Other records that Cannon owns includes producing 48 career double-doubles (second among then active NCAA players), and he was the NCAA Division I active rebound leader. In 2014–15, Cannon earned 5 NEC Player of the Week Awards, the Lou Henson Award National Player of the Week honors, and 2 Metropolitan Basketball Writers Association Player of the Week honors, and he was named to the Barclays Classic All-Tournament Team. At the end of the season, he was named the NEC Player of the Year and selected for the First Team All-NEC squad for the second consecutive year. In April, the Terriers' senior forward became the first St. Francis Brooklyn player to be named to the All-Met Division I First Team and also the first Terrier to become an AP Honorable Mention All-American.

=== Records ===
- Most rebounds in a game by an NCAA DI freshman in 2012 with 20 (vs. Fairleigh Dickinson February 25, 2012).
- St. Francis all-time leader in made free throws with 342 (vs. Monmouth on December 23, 2014).
- Second player in program history and fourth in Northeast Conference history to record 1,000 rebounds (vs. Mount St. Mary's on January 29, 2015).
- Exceeded 1,500 career points and became the first player in program history and second in Northeast Conference history to record 1,500 points and 1,000 rebounds (vs. Central Connecticut on February 5, 2015).
- All-time rebounds leader in Northeast Conference history with 1,159
- All-time scoring leader in program history with 1,720

=== Statistics ===
Jalen Cannon Statistics (As of March 20, 2015)
			Minutes		Scoring		Total FGs			3-point FGs			Free-Throws			Rebounds							
Season	GP	GS	Tot	Avg	Pts	Avg	FG	FGA	Pct	3FG	3FA	Pct	FT	FTA	Pct	Off	Def	Tot	Avg	A	TO	Blk	Stl
2011–12	30	18	736	24.5	240	8	85	153	.556	0	0	.000	70	118	.593	104	161	265	8.8	22	24	16	17
2012–13	30	29	910	30.3	440	14.7	170	306	.556	6	24	.250	94	138	.681	103	161	264	8.8	20	43	11	30
2013–14	32	32	959	30.0	476	14.9	164	335	.490	13	48	.271	135	189	.714	94	169	263	8.2	39	37	17	20
2014–15	35	35	1184	33.8	564	16.1	210	404	.520	27	81	.333	117	168	.696	139	228	367	10.5	34	58	27	24
Total	127	114	3789	29.8	1720	13.5	629	1198	.525	46	153	.301	416	613	.679	440	719	1159	9.13	115	162	71	91

Legend
GP	Games played	GS	Games started	Avg	Average per game
FG	Field-goals made	FGA	Field-goal attempts	Off	Offensive rebounds
Def	Defensive rebounds	A	Assists	TO	Turnovers
Blk	Blocks	Stl	Steals	High	Team high

== Professional career ==
=== 2015–2016 ===
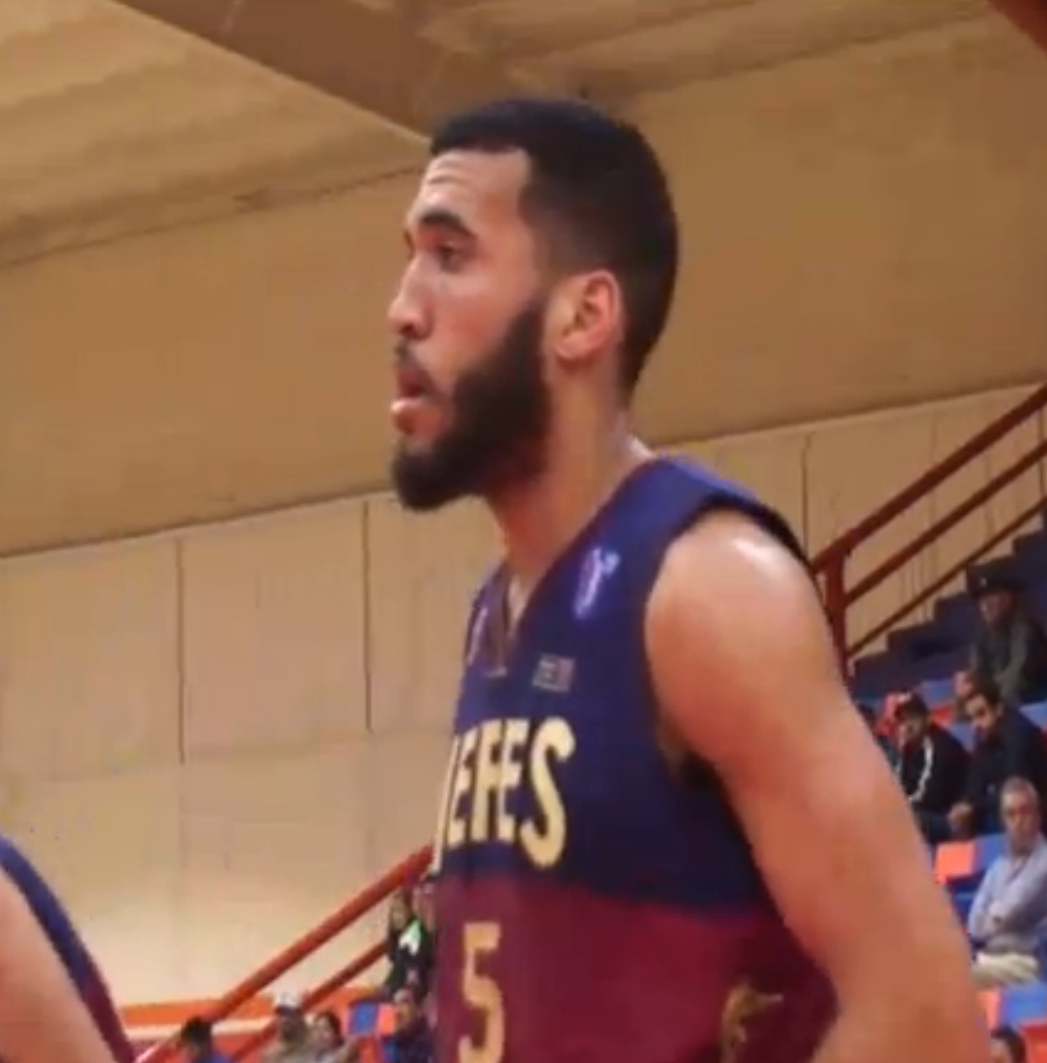
Cannon playing for the Jefes on December 5, 2015, against the Correcaminos.

After graduating from St. Francis College, Cannon agreed with Overtime International Sports to represent him as he looked to FIBA Europe for a team to sign with. Cannon ended up signing with the Jefes de Fuerza Lagunera of the Mexican National Professional Basketball league. The Jefes were in their second year in the league. Cannon made his debut on November 26, 2015, the 11th game of the season for the Jefes and scored 19 points and grabbed 9 rebounds in a game that they lost 78–91. Since his first game, Cannon become a starter for the Jefes and averaged 30.4 mpg, 13 ppg and 8.2 rpg, which were 3rd in the league. On February 21, 2016, Cannon scored a career high 32 points and grabbed 7 rebounds against Fuerza Regia de Monterrey. During his time with the Jefes, Cannon gained the moniker El Cañón (The Cannon). Prior to his arrival, the team was 3–7 and had since gone 14–9 until they were forced to forfeit their last 6 games due to not meeting roster regulations because of player suspensions. The team ended the season at 17–22, last in the league and didn't qualify for the playoffs. In his 20 games, Cannon averaged 12.7 ppg and 8.1 rpg.

=== 2016–2017 ===
On August 29, 2016, it was announced that Cannon was signed by Hapoel Afula B.C. of the Liga Leumit. Cannon played in 29 games and averaged 17.3 points per game with Hapoel Afula. He also recorded 8.9 rebounds and 1.5 assist per game.

=== 2017–2018 ===
Fortitudo Agrigento of the Italian second division, Serie A2, signed Cannon on June 27, 2017. He posted 15.4 points per game and 9.6 rebounds per game while averaging 2 assist per game in 2017–18. Cannon won Player of the month in February 2018. Cannon re-signed with the squad on June 30, 2018.

=== 2018–2019 ===
Cannon continued to play for Fortitudo Agrigento and was selected as the Lumicom A2 West Most Valuable Player of the Month for February after he tallied double-doubles in four-straight games.

=== 2022–2023 ===
On July 16, 2022, he signed with Vanoli Cremona of the Italian Serie A2.
