= High School for Construction Trades, Engineering and Architecture =

Public school in New York City

High School For Construction Trades, Engineering And Architecture
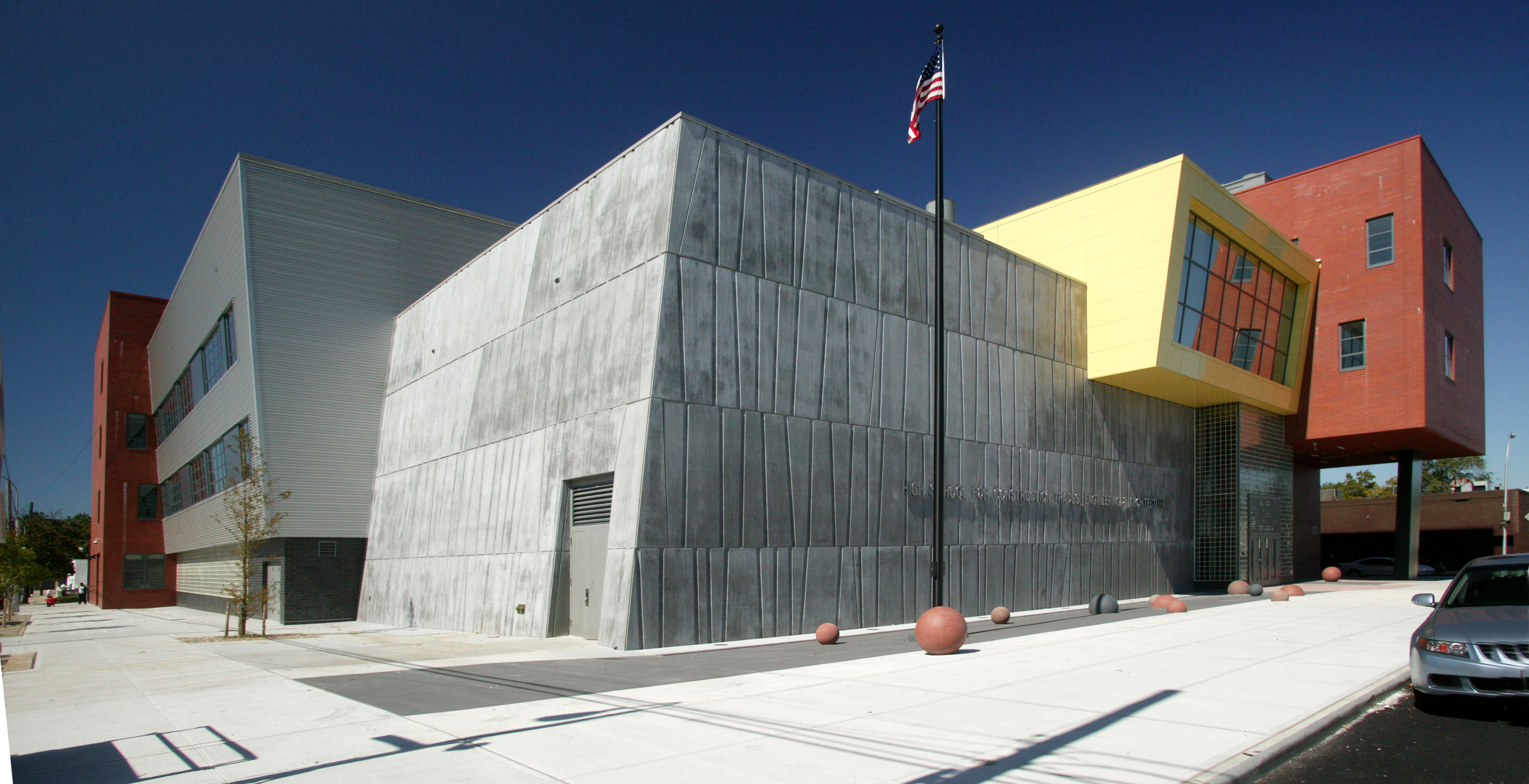

Location
- 94-06 104th Street; Queens, New York 11416
- Coordinates: 40°41′22″N 73°50′27″W

Information
- School type: Public High School Career & Technical Education
- Motto: "Building Our Future Today, Designing Your Future Tomorrow"
- Opened: September 2006
- School district: NYCDOE 27
- Authority: New York City Department of Education
- School number: 650
- School code: 27Q650
- CEEB code: 334656
- Principal: Lakeisha Gordon
- Employees: 100-125
- Grades: 9, 10, 11, 12
- Enrollment: 914
- Average class size: 28-32
- Student to teacher ratio: 1:15
- Classes offered: CTE Classes, CUNY College Now, Advanced Placement
- Language: English, Spanish
- Schedule type: Full
- Schedule: 8 periods/day
- Hours in school day: 6 hours and 21 minutes
- Colors: Red, Black, White
- Athletics conference: Public School Athletic League
- Sports: Basketball, Softball, Baseball, Track & Field, Cross-Country, Girls Flag-Football, Cricket, Volleyball
- Mascot: Redhawk
- Nickname: HS for CTEA
- Team name: Redhawks; Lady Redhawks
- Accreditation: NYSED
- Website: www.hsforctea.org

The High School for Construction Trades Engineering and Architecture (HS for CTEA) is a New York City Department of Education Career and Technical Education (CTE) school. This school was established in 2006 by the New York State Department of Education. It was intended to support its students to the fields of architecture, engineering or construction trades. In the 2009–2010 school year this high school had its first graduating class. This school is separated into three different majors architecture, engineering and construction trades. Each of them having a four-year course of study.

== Extracurricular activities ==
- Boys Soccer Club
- Chess Club
- Dance Club
- Debate Club
- Dream Catchers
- FIRST Robotics
- Fitness Club
- Girls Basketball/Soccer Club
- Genders & Sexualities Alliance
- History Club
- Homework Club
- Music Club
- Relationship Abuse Prevention Program
- Student Government Organization
- SkillsUSA
- Tabletop Gaming Club
- Video Game Club
- Volleyball Club

== Sports - ==
Public School Athletic League

- Baseball Boys Varsity - AAA Eastern
- Basketball Boys Jr. Varsity - Queens I
- Basketball Boys Varsity - Queens AA II
- Basketball Girls Varsity - Queens B East
- Cricket Coed Varsity - Queens III
- Cross Country Boys
- Cross Country Girls
- Handball Girls Varsity - Queens III
- Indoor Track Boys
- Indoor Track Girls
- Outdoor Track Boys
- Outdoor Track Girls
- Soccer Girls Jr. Varsity - Division III
- Soccer Girls Varsity - Queens A
- Softball Girls Jr. Varsity - Queens II
- Softball Girls Varsity - Queens AA
- Volleyball Girls Varsity - Queens A South/West

== Career and technical education majors ==
- Construction Trades
- Engineering
- Architecture
