= John Hardin High School =

Location
- 384 W. A. Jenkins Road; Elizabethtown, Kentucky 42701
- 37.7554°N 85.9039°W

Information
- School type: Public
- Motto: Strength, Determination, and Bulldog Pride. That's the Bulldog Way!
- Founded: 2001
- School district: Hardin County Schools
- Superintendent: Teresa Morgan
- Principal: Mark Wells
- Teaching staff: 53.93 (FTE)
- Grades: 9–12
- Enrollment: 806 (2023–2024)
- Student to teacher ratio: 14.95
- Campus: Suburban
- Color
- Mascot: Bulldog
- Website: https://jhhs.hardin.kyschools.us/

John Hardin High School is a school located in Radcliff, Kentucky, but served by the post office of neighboring Elizabethtown. Established in 2001, the school is named after the Revolutionary War officer and Native American fighter, John Hardin.

== Bill Clinton visit ==
Former US President Bill Clinton visited John Hardin High School on May 19, 2008, to campaign for his wife, US Senator Hillary Clinton, in the 2008 presidential Democratic primary campaign. He met John Hardin Principal Alvin Garrison and other members of the staff, and valedictorian, Will Chadwick, before delivering his speech. The event was open to the public.

== Notable alumni ==
- Daniel Cameron, 51st Attorney General of Kentucky
