= 2014–15 Northeast Conference men's basketball season =

- League: NCAA Division I
- Sport: Basketball
- Number of teams: 10
- TV partner(s): NEC Front Row, ESPN2, MSG, FCS, Regional Sports Networks

Regular Season
- First place: St. Francis Brooklyn
- Runners-up: Robert Morris
- Season MVP: Jalen Cannon, SFBK
- Top scorer: Dyami Starks, BU

Tournament
- Champions: Robert Morris
- Runners-up: St. Francis Brooklyn
- Finals MVP: Rodney Prior, RMU

Northeast Conference men's basketball seasons
- ← 2013–14 2015–16 →

2014–15 Northeast Conference men's basketball standings
	Conf.				Overall
Team	W		L	PCT	W		L	PCT
St. Francis Brooklyn	15	–	3	.833	23	–	12	.657
Robert Morris †	12	–	6	.667	20	–	15	.571
Bryant	12	–	6	.667	16	–	15	.516
Mount St. Mary's	11	–	7	.611	15	–	15	.500
Saint Francis	9	–	9	.500	16	–	16	.500
Sacred Heart	9	–	9	.500	15	–	17	.469
LIU Brooklyn	8	–	10	.444	12	–	18	.400
Wagner	8	–	10	.444	10	–	20	.333
Fairleigh Dickinson	3	–	15	.167	8	–	21	.276
Central Connecticut	3	–	15	.167	5	–	26	.161
† 2015 NEC tournament winner

The 2014–15 NEC men's basketball season began with practices in October 2014, followed by the start of the 2014–15 NCAA Division I men's basketball season in November. Conference play started in early January 2015 and concluded in March with the 2015 Northeast Conference men's basketball tournament.

== Preseason ==
=== Rankings ===
	NEC Coaches Poll
1.	St. Francis Brooklyn (6)
2.	Central Connecticut (3)
3.	Saint Francis (PA) (1)
4.	Robert Morris
5.	Mount St. Mary's
6.	Bryant
7.	Wagner
8.	LIU Brooklyn
9.	Fairleigh Dickinson
10.	Sacred Heart

() first place votes

=== All-NEC team ===
Coaches Poll

Earl Brown Saint Francis (PA)
Jalen Cannon St. Francis Brooklyn
Lucky Jones Robert Morris
Dyami Starks Bryant
Kyle Vinales Central Connecticut

== Head coaches ==
Team	Head coach	Previous school	Seasons at school	Overall record	NEC record	NCAA Tournaments	NCAA Final Fours	NCAA Championships
Bryant	Tim O'Shea	Ohio	7	57–124	31–57	0	0	0
Central Connecticut	Howie Dickenman	Connecticut (asst.)	19	273–260	181–127	3	0	0
Fairleigh Dickinson	Greg Herenda	UMass Lowell	2	10–21	6–10	0	0	0
LIU Brooklyn	Jack Perri	Long Island (assoc. HC)	3	29–34	16–18	1	0	0
Mount St. Mary's	Jamion Christian	VCU (asst.)	3	34–31	20–14	1	0	0
Robert Morris	Andrew Toole	Robert Morris (asst.)	5	90–51	54–17	0	0	0
Sacred Heart	Anthony Latina	Sacred Heart (asst.)	2	5–26	2–14	0	0	0
St. Francis Brooklyn	Glenn Braica	St. John's (asst.)	5	60–62	39–31	0	0	0
Saint Francis (PA)	Rob Krimmel	Saint Francis (PA) (asst.)	3	15–45	12–22	0	0	0
Wagner	Bashir Mason	Wagner (asst.)	3	38–24	24–10	0	0	0

Notes:

- All records, appearances, titles, etc. are from time with current school only.
- Year at school includes 2014–15 season.
- Overall and NEC/NCAA records are from time at current school and are before the beginning of the 2014–15 season.
- Previous jobs are head coaching jobs unless otherwise noted.

== NEC regular season ==
=== Conference matrix ===
This table summarizes the head-to-head results between teams in conference play. (x) indicates games remaining this season.

	Bryant	Central Conn.	Fairleigh Dickinson	LIU Br'klyn	Mount St. Mary's	Robert Morris	Sacred Heart	St. Francis Br'klyn	Saint Francis (PA)	Wagner
vs. Bryant	–	0–2	0–2	0–2	1–1	1–1	2–0	1–1	1–1	0–2
vs. Central Conn.	2–0	–	2–0	2–0	2–0	2–0	1–1	2–0	1–1	1–1
vs. Fairleigh Dickinson	2–0	0–2	–	1–1	2–0	2–0	2–0	2–0	2–0	2–0
vs. LIU Br'klyn	2–0	0–2	1–1	–	2–0	0–2	1–1	2–0	0–2	2–0
vs. Mount St. Mary's	1–1	0–2	0–2	0–2	–	2–0	1–1	1–1	1–1	1–1
vs. Robert Morris	1–1	0–2	0–2	2–0	0–2	–	1–1	1–1	1–1	0–2
vs. Sacred Heart	0–2	1–1	0–2	1–1	1–1	1–1	–	2–0	2–0	1–1
vs. St. Francis Br'klyn	1–1	0–2	0–2	0–2	1–1	1–1	0–2	–	0–2	0–2
vs. Saint Francis (PA)	1–1	1–1	0–2	2–0	1–1	1–1	0–2	2–0	–	1–1
vs. Wagner	2–0	1–1	0–2	0–2	1–1	2–0	1–1	2–0	1–1	–
Total	12–6	3–15	3–15	8–10	11–7	12-6	9-9	15-3	9-9	8–10

=== Player of the week ===
Throughout the regular season, the Northeast Conference offices named a player of the week and a freshman of the week each Monday. Jalen Cannon garnered 5 player of the week honors and St. Francis Brooklyn all programs with 6. Marcquise Reed led all freshman with 6 player of the week honors, Cane Broom came in second with 5 and in week 4 won both Player of the Week and Rookie of the Week.

Week (Date)	Player of the week	Freshman of the week
1 (Nov. 17, 2014)	De'von Barnett, SHU	Marcquise Reed, RMU
2 (Nov. 24, 2014)	Rodney Pryor, RMU	Nura Zanna, LIU
3 (Dec. 1, 2014)	Jalen Cannon, SFBK	JoJo Cooper, WC
4 (Dec. 8, 2014)	Cane Broome, SHU	Cane Broome, SHU
5 (Dec. 15, 2014)	Rodney Pryor, RMU	Elvar Fridriksson, LIU
6 (Dec. 22, 2014)	Earl Brown, SFU	Cane Broome, SHU
7 (Dec. 29, 2014)	Jalen Cannon, SFBK	Marcquise Reed, RMU
8 (Jan. 6, 2015)	Jalen Cannon, SFBK; Earl Brown, SFU	Marcquise Reed, RMU; Darian Anderson, FDU
9 (Jan. 12, 2015)	Dan Garvin, BU	Nura Zanna, LIU
10 (Jan. 19, 2015)	Brent Jones, SFBK	Marcquise Reed, RMU
11 (Jan. 26, 2015)	Martin Hermannsson, LIU; Marcus Burton, WC	Cane Broome, SHU
12 (Feb. 2, 2015)	Marcus Burton, WC	Marcquise Reed, RMU
13 (Feb. 9, 2015)	Jalen Cannon, SFBK	Marcquise Reed, RMU
14 (Feb. 16, 2015)	Dyami Starks, BU	Martin Hermannsson, LIU
15 (Feb. 23, 2015)	Jalen Cannon, SFBK	Cane Broome, SHU
16 (Mar. 2, 2015)	Rodney Prior, RMU	Cane Broome, SHU

== Postseason ==
=== NEC tournament ===
- March 4–10, 2015 Northeast Conference Basketball Tournament.

Quarterfinals; Wednesday, March 4 NEC Front Row, MSG+2, FCS and Cox Sports
1	St. Francis Brooklyn	79
8	LIU Brooklyn	70
4	Mount St. Mary's	58
5	Saint Francis (PA)	73
(Pairings are reseeded after the first round)
2	Robert Morris	91
7	Wagner	68
3	Bryant	91**
6	Sacred Heart	85

Semifinals; Saturday, March 7 (reseeded); NEC Front Row, MSG+, FCS
1	St. Francis Brooklyn	62
5	Saint Francis (PA)	48
2	Robert Morris	66
3	Bryant	53

Championship; Tuesday, March 10; ESPN2
1	St. Francis Brooklyn	63
2	Robert Morris	66

All games will be played at the venue of the higher seed
* Overtime

=== NCAA tournament ===
Seed	Region	School	First Four	2nd Round	3rd Round	Sweet 16	Elite Eight	Final Four	Championship
16	South	Robert Morris	W, 81–77 vs. #16 North Florida – (Dayton)	L, 56–85 vs. #1 Duke – (Charlotte)					

=== National Invitational tournament ===
Seed	Bracket	School	1st Round	2nd Round	Quarterfinals	Semifinals	Championship
8	Richmond	St. Francis Brooklyn	L, 74–84 vs. #1 Richmond				

=== CollegeInsider.com Postseason tournament ===
Seed	Bracket	School	1st Round	2nd Round	Quarterfinals	Semifinals	Championship
		Saint Francis (PA)	L, 64–67 vs. Bowling Green				

== Honors and awards ==
=== All-Americans ===
Starting on March 6, the 2015 NCAA Men's Basketball All-Americans were released for 2014–15 season, based upon selections by the four major syndicates. The four syndicates include the Associated Press, USBWA, NABC, and Sporting News.

- Jalen Cannon SFBK, AP Honorable Mention

=== All-NEC awards and teams ===
2015 NEC Men's Basketball Individual Awards
Award	Recipient(s)
Player of the Year	Jalen Cannon, St. Francis Brooklyn
Coach of the Year	Glenn Braica, St. Francis Brooklyn
Defensive Player of the Year	Amdy Fall, St. Francis Brooklyn
Rookie of the Year	Marcquise Reed, Robert Morris
Most Improved Player of the Year	Matt Mobley, Central Connecticut

2015 NEC Men's Basketball All-Conference Teams
First Team	Second Team	Third Team	Rookie Team
Earl Brown, Sr., F., SFU; Marcus Burton, Sr., G., WC †Jalen Cannon, Sr., F., SFBK; Brent Jones, Sr., G., SFBK; Dyami Starks, Sr., G., BU	Dan Garvin, So., F., BU; Lucky Jones, Sr., G., RMU; Matt Mobley, So., G., CCSU; Rodney Prior, Jr., G., RMU; Marcquise Reed, Fr., G., RMU	Byron Ashe, So., G., MSM; Gregory Graves, Jr., F., MSM; Evan Kelly, Sr., G., SHU; Gerrell Martin, Sr., G., LIU; Joe O'Shea, Sr., G., BU	Cane Broome, Fr., G., SHU; Martin Hermannsson, Fr., G., LIU; Marcquise Reed, Fr., G., RMU; Junior Robinson, Fr., G., MSM; Nura Zanna, Fr., F., LIU
† - denotes unanimous selection

== Milestones and records ==
- On January 4, 2015, head coach Andrew Toole of Robert Morris became the quickest to 100 wins in NEC history, needing just 160 games to get there.
- On February 7, 2015, senior forward Jalen Cannon of the St. Francis Brooklyn Terriers became the all-time rebounds leader in Northeast Conference history.

== See also ==
2014–15 Northeast Conference women's basketball season
