= 2014–15 Wagner Seahawks men's basketball team =

American college basketball season

2014–15 Wagner Seahawks men's basketball
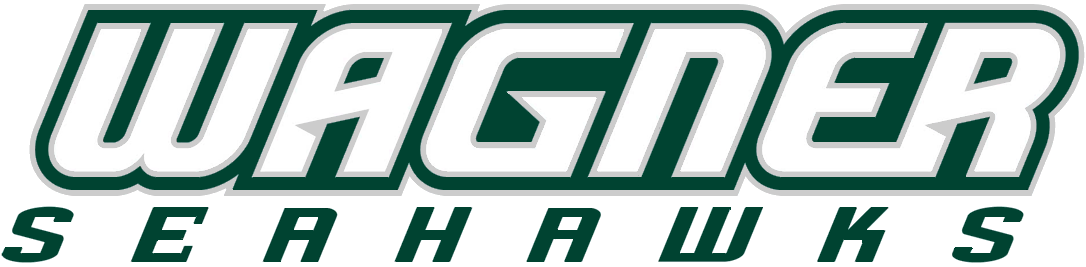
- Conference: Northeast Conference
- Record: 10–20 (8–10 NEC)
- Head coach: Bashir Mason (3rd season)
- Assistant coaches: Mike Babul; Marquis Webb; Scott Smith
- Home arena: Spiro Sports Center

2014–15 Northeast Conference men's basketball standings
	Conf.				Overall
Team	W		L	PCT	W		L	PCT
St. Francis Brooklyn	15	–	3	.833	23	–	12	.657
Robert Morris †	12	–	6	.667	20	–	15	.571
Bryant	12	–	6	.667	16	–	15	.516
Mount St. Mary's	11	–	7	.611	15	–	15	.500
Saint Francis	9	–	9	.500	16	–	16	.500
Sacred Heart	9	–	9	.500	15	–	17	.469
LIU Brooklyn	8	–	10	.444	12	–	18	.400
Wagner	8	–	10	.444	10	–	20	.333
Fairleigh Dickinson	3	–	15	.167	8	–	21	.276
Central Connecticut	3	–	15	.167	5	–	26	.161
† 2015 NEC tournament winner

The 2014–15 Wagner Seahawks men's basketball team represented Wagner College during the 2014–15 NCAA Division I men's basketball season. The Seahawks were led by third year head coach Bashir Mason. They played their home games at Spiro Sports Center and were members of the Northeast Conference. They finished the season 10–20, 8–10 in NEC play to finish in a tie for seventh place. They lost in the quarterfinals of the NEC tournament to Robert Morris.

== Roster ==
Number	Name	Position	Height	Weight	Year	Hometown
0	Corey Henson	Guard	6–2	170	Freshman	Upper Marlboro, Maryland
1	Aaren Edmead	Guard	5–10	165	Freshman	Deer Park, New York
2	Dwaun Anderson	Guard	6–4	200	Junior	Suttons Bay, Michigan
4	Marcus Burton	Guard	6–0	170	Senior	Charlotte, North Carolina
5	Jojo Cooper	Guard	6–1	190	Freshman	Wilmington, Delaware
11	Romone Saunders	Guard	6–3	200	Freshman	Temple Hills, Maryland
12	Hugo Naurais	Forward	6–8	210	Senior	Nîmes, France
13	Langston Burnett	Guard	6–5	210	Junior	Beltsville, Maryland
21	Japhet Kadji	Forward	6–7	205	Freshman	Douala, Cameroon
22	Stedman Allen	Forward	6–6	200	Junior	Bronx, New York
32	Nolan Long	Forward	6–10	240	Sophomore	Waterford, Connecticut
34	Mike Aaman	Forward	6–8	210	Junior	Hazlet, New Jersey
35	Greg Senat	Guard	6–8	240	Sophomore	Elmont, New York

== Schedule ==
Date time, TV	Opponent	Result	Record	Site (attendance) city, state
Regular season
11/14/2014*; 7:30 pm, ESPN3	at Maryland	L 48-82	0–1	Comcast Center (10,015); College Park, MD
11/18/2014*; 7:00 pm	at Columbia	L 56-70	0–2	Levien Gymnasium (848); New York, NY
11/20/2014*; 7:00 pm	SUNY Old Westbury	W 83–49	1–2	Spiro Sports Center (1,658); Staten Island, NY
11/23/2014*; 4:30 pm	at Hofstra	L 71–93	1–3	Mack Sports Complex (1,392); Hempstead, NY
11/29/2014*; 4:00 pm	Penn	W 64–61	2–3	Spiro Sports Center (1,876); Staten Island, NY
12/02/2014*; 7:00 pm	at Maine	L 81–82 ^{OT}	2–4	Cross Insurance Center (851); Bangor, ME
12/06/2014*; 2:00 pm	at Lafayette	L 84–97	2–5	Kirby Sports Center (1,744); Easton, PA
12/14/2014*; 1:00 pm	at Vermont	L 47–61	2–6	Patrick Gym (2,038); Burlington, VT
12/20/2014*; 4:00 pm	Monmouth	L 66–74	2–7	Spiro Sports Center (1,311); Staten Island, NY
12/23/2014*; 7:00 pm, ESPN3	at Cincinnati	L 48–72	2–8	Fifth Third Arena (6,023); Cincinnati, OH
12/29/2014*; 7:00 pm	Rider	L 71–76	2–9	Spiro Sports Center (1,323); Staten Island, NY
01/03/2015; 4:00 pm	at Saint Francis (PA)	L 68–85	2–10 (0–1)	DeGol Arena (722); Loretto, PA
01/05/2015; 7:00 pm	Mount St. Mary's	W 85–83 ^{2OT}	3–10 (1–1)	Spiro Sports Center (1,223); Staten Island, NY
01/08/2015; 7:00 pm	Robert Morris	L 73–77	3–11 (1–2)	Spiro Sports Center (2,055); Staten Island, NY
01/10/2015; 4:00 pm, ESPN3	LIU Brooklyn	W 87–82	4–11 (2–2)	Spiro Sports Center (1,723); Staten Island, NY
01/15/2015; 7:00 pm	at Bryant	L 73–81	4–12 (2–3)	Chace Athletic Center (347); Smithfield, RI
01/17/2015; 4:30 pm	at Fairleigh Dickinson	W 82–68	5–12 (3–3)	Rothman Center (853); Hackensack, NJ
01/22/2015; 7:00 pm	Saint Francis (PA)	W 63–58	6–12 (4–3)	Spiro Sports Center (1,247); Staten Island, NY
01/24/2015; 3:30 pm	at Central Connecticut	L 50–53	6–13 (4–4)	William H. Detrick Gymnasium (1,050); New Britain, CT
01/29/2015; 7:00 pm	Sacred Heart	W 75–64	7–13 (5–4)	Spiro Sports Center (1,632); Staten Island, NY
01/31/2015; 4:00 pm	Central Connecticut	W 86–55	8–13 (6–4)	Spiro Sports Center (1,783); Staten Island, NY
02/05/2015; 7:00 pm	at Sacred Heart	L 75–86	8–14 (6–5)	William H. Pitt Center (305); Fairfield, CT
02/07/2015; 4:00 pm	St. Francis Brooklyn	L 51–66	8–15 (6–6)	Spiro Sports Center (1,876); Staten Island, NY
02/12/2015; 7:00 pm	at St. Francis Brooklyn	L 66–83	8–16 (6–7)	Generoso Pope Athletic Complex (889); Brooklyn, NY
02/14/2015; 4:00 pm	Fairleigh Dickinson	W 83–79 ^{OT}	9–16 (7–7)	Spiro Sports Center (1,087); Staten Island, NY
02/19/2015; 7:00 pm	Bryant	L 65–66	9–17 (7–8)	Spiro Sports Center (1,402); Staten Island, NY
02/21/2015; 4:30 pm	at LIU Brooklyn	W 60–47	10–17 (8–8)	Steinberg Wellness Center (1,217); Brooklyn, NY
02/26/2015; 7:00 pm	at Robert Morris	L 59–91	10–18 (8–9)	Charles L. Sewall Center (1,064); Moon Township, PA
02/28/2015; 2:00 pm	at Mount St. Mary's	L 64–74	10–19 (8–10)	Knott Arena (1,308); Emmitsburg, MD
Northeast Conference tournament
03/04/2015; 7:00 pm	at Robert Morris; Quarterfinals	L 68–91	10–20	Charles L. Sewall Center (857); Moon Township, PA
*Non-conference game. ^{#}Rankings from AP Poll. (#) Tournament seedings in parentheses. All times are in Eastern Time..
