= 2014–15 Mount St. Mary's Mountaineers men's basketball team =

American college basketball season

2014–15 Mount St. Mary's Mountaineers men's basketball
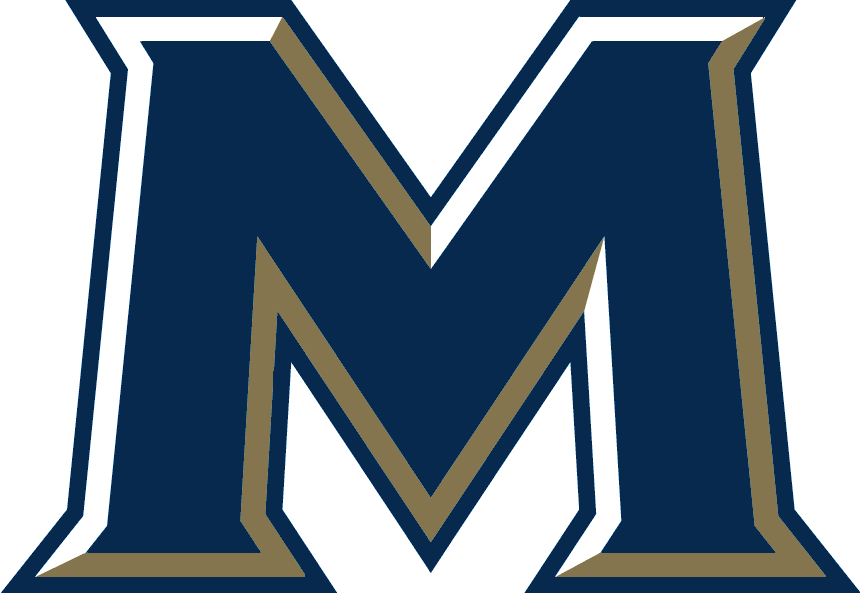
- Conference: Northeast Conference
- Record: 15–15 (11–7 NEC)
- Head coach: Jamion Christian (3rd season)
- Assistant coaches: Ben Wilkins; Darryl Bruce; Donny Lind
- Home arena: Knott Arena

2014–15 Northeast Conference men's basketball standings
	Conf.				Overall
Team	W		L	PCT	W		L	PCT
St. Francis Brooklyn	15	–	3	.833	23	–	12	.657
Robert Morris †	12	–	6	.667	20	–	15	.571
Bryant	12	–	6	.667	16	–	15	.516
Mount St. Mary's	11	–	7	.611	15	–	15	.500
Saint Francis	9	–	9	.500	16	–	16	.500
Sacred Heart	9	–	9	.500	15	–	17	.469
LIU Brooklyn	8	–	10	.444	12	–	18	.400
Wagner	8	–	10	.444	10	–	20	.333
Fairleigh Dickinson	3	–	15	.167	8	–	21	.276
Central Connecticut	3	–	15	.167	5	–	26	.161
† 2015 NEC tournament winner

The 2014–15 Mount St. Mary's Mountaineers men's basketball team represented Mount St. Mary's University during the 2014–15 NCAA Division I men's basketball season. The Mountaineers played their home games at Knott Arena, a 3,500-seat facility on the university's campus in Emmitsburg, Maryland. For the 26th season, the team was a member of the Northeast Conference.

The team was led by third-year head coach Jamion Christian, who prior to the season was given a contract extension to coach the team through the 2018–19 season.

Newcomers to the team included Chris Martin and Andrew Smeathers, transfers from Marshall and Butler, respectively. Martin joined the team at the beginning of the season; however, due to NCAA transfer rules, Smeathers was unable to join the team until the December 20 game against American, the first game after the end of the fall semester. Other incoming players included freshmen Troy Henderson, Chris Manning, Lamont "Junior" Robinson, Mawdo "Mo" Sallah and Chris Wray. At 5-foot-5, Robinson was the shortest player in Division I men's basketball for the 2014–15 season.

The Mountaineers finished the season 15–15, 11–7 in NEC play, to finish fourth in the conference. They lost in the quarterfinals of the 2015 NEC tournament to St. Francis (PA).

== Previous season ==
The 2013–14 Mountaineers finished the regular season with a record of 13–16 (9–7 in the Northeast Conference) and qualified for the conference tournament as the #4 seed. They defeated St. Francis Brooklyn at home in the first game before winning road games against Wagner and Robert Morris to win the conference championship for the fourth time.

With a record of 16–16, the Mountaineers were seeded in the 2014 NCAA Men's Division I Basketball Tournament as a co-16 seed in the South Region and played Albany in a First Four game. The Mountaineers were defeated by the Great Danes, 71–64, and finished the season with a 16–17 record.

== Departures ==
Name	Number	Pos.	Height	Weight	Year	Hometown	Notes
Sam Prescott	3	G	6'3"	185	Senior	Philadelphia, PA	Graduated
Will Lyle	14	F	6'6"	195	Sophomore	Washington, D.C.	Left team for personal reasons
Rashad Whack	22	G	6'2"	179	Senior	Hyattsville, MD	Graduated, signed with the Island Storm of the National Basketball League of Canada
Julian Norfleet	23	G	6'2"	165	Senior	Virginia Beach, VA	Graduated, signed with the BC Rilski Sportist in Bulgaria

== Incoming freshmen ==
Chris Wray, a 6-foot-8 forward who attended Fishburne Military School in Waynesboro, Virginia, announced his intention to play for Mount St. Mary's in September 2012 while he was a senior at Shelby High School in North Carolina. As a junior at Shelby High prior to his commitment, he averaged more than 11 points and 6 rebounds.

Lamont "Junior" Robinson, a 5-foot-5 point guard from Mebane, North Carolina, announced in June 2013 that he was giving a verbal commitment to Mount St. Mary's. Robinson averaged 22 points and 5.3 assists per game in his senior year at Eastern Alamance High School, and was named to North Carolina's all-state team.

Mawdo "Mo" Sallah, a 6-foot-8 center, announced his commitment to Mount St. Mary's in October 2013. A native-born Gambian, Sallah came to the United States as a teenager and attended Broadfording Christian Academy in Hagerstown, Maryland, before going to Fishburne Military School as a post-graduate. In his senior year at BCA, Sallah averaged 18 points, 14.8 rebounds and 4.5 blocked shots.

Chris Manning, a 6-foot-7 forward from Randallstown, Maryland, committed to Mount St. Mary's in May 2013. Troy Henderson, a 6-foot-9 forward from Gastonia, North Carolina, joined the Mountaineers after a senior season at Gaston Day School during which he averaged 12 points, 8 rebounds and 4 blocks. Both Manning and Henderson were redshirted for the 2014–15 season by Mount St. Mary's.

== Incoming transfers ==
Chris Martin, a 6-foot-0 shooting guard from Upper Marlboro, Maryland, transferred to Mount St. Mary's from Marshall in April 2013. Pursuant to NCAA transfer rules, Martin sat out the 2013–14 season and joined the team in 2014–15. In two seasons with Marshall, Martin appeared in 41 games and averaged 2.3 points per game.

Andrew Smeathers, a 6-foot-8 forward from Bargersville, Indiana, announced in December 2013 that he would be transferring to Mount St. Mary's from Butler. During his two seasons at Butler, Smeathers scored just 63 points. Because of the timing of his transfer, Smeathers had to sit out the Mountaineers' first eight games of the 2014–15 season before he was eligible to play.

== Roster ==
2014–15 Mount St. Mary's Mountaineers men's basketball team
Players
Coaches

Pos.	#	Name	Height	Weight	Year	Previous school	Hometown
G	0	Chris Martin	6 ft 0 in (1.83 m)	185 lb (84 kg)	Jr	St. Patrick High School	Upper Marlboro, Maryland
C	1	Mawdo "Mo" Sallah	6 ft 8 in (2.03 m)	215 lb (98 kg)	Fr	Broadfording Christian Academy	Latri Kunda, Gambia
G	2	Byron Ashe	6 ft 1 in (1.85 m)	170 lb (77 kg)	So	Friendship Collegiate	Washington, D.C.
G	3	Junior Robinson	5 ft 5 in (1.65 m)	165 lb (75 kg)	Fr	Eastern Alamance High School	Mebane, North Carolina
G	4	Khalid Nwandu	6 ft 3 in (1.91 m)	180 lb (82 kg)	So	Northeastern High School	York, Pennsylvania
G	5	Liam MacManimon (W)	5 ft 10 in (1.78 m)	160 lb (73 kg)	Jr	Holy Spirit High School	Galloway, New Jersey
F	11	Will Miller	6 ft 6 in (1.98 m)	190 lb (86 kg)	So	Highland Park High School	Dallas, Texas
G	12	Charles Glover	6 ft 1 in (1.85 m)	185 lb (84 kg)	RS Fr	Gonzaga College High School	Bowie, Maryland
F	13	Kristijan Krajina	6 ft 11 in (2.11 m)	245 lb (111 kg)	GS	Blue Ridge School	Osijek, Croatia
F	15	Gregory Graves	6 ft 7 in (2.01 m)	235 lb (107 kg)	Jr	Potomac Falls High School	Sterling, Virginia
G	21	Maalik Howard	6 ft 0 in (1.83 m)	170 lb (77 kg)	So	Potomac High School	Woodbridge, Virginia
F	22	Troy Henderson (redshirt)	6 ft 9 in (2.06 m)	185 lb (84 kg)	Fr	Gaston Day School	Gastonia, North Carolina
F	30	Andrew Smeathers	6 ft 8 in (2.03 m)	205 lb (93 kg)	Jr	Center Grove High School	Bargersville, Indiana
F	34	Aaron Brown (W)	6 ft 7 in (2.01 m)	220 lb (100 kg)	Sr	Fort Worth Country Day School	Fort Worth, Texas
F	35	Chris Wray	6 ft 8 in (2.03 m)	190 lb (86 kg)	Fr	Fishburne Military School	Shelby, North Carolina
F	44	Chris Manning (redshirt)	6 ft 7 in (2.01 m)	190 lb (86 kg)	Fr	Randallstown High School	Randallstown, Maryland
C	50	Taylor Danaher	7 ft 0 in (2.13 m)	225 lb (102 kg)	Jr	Fredericksburg Christian School	Fredericksburg, Virginia

Head coach

- Jamion Christian

Assistant coach(es)

- Ben Wilkins
- Darryl Bruce
- Donny Lind

Legend

- (C) Team captain
- (S) Suspended
- (I) Ineligible
- (W) Walk-on
- Injured
- Current redshirt

Roster
Last update: 02/14/2015

== Pre-season ==
Despite having advanced to the NCAA tournament in the 2013–14 season as winners of the 2014 NEC tournament, the Mountaineers were ranked fifth of the 10 teams in the conference in its preseason poll. This was due in part to the team having lost its three leading scorers from the previous season (Julian Norfleet, Rashad Whack and Sam Prescott) to graduation.

The website Big Apple Buckets, which covers college basketball in the Northeast, named Chris Martin to its Preseason NEC All-Conference Third Team, saying that he "may struggle during the Mount’s insanely difficult non-conference schedule, but by the time NEC play rolls around, we expect the Marshall transfer to lead his team in scoring and be a pest defensively. His ability to score a variety of ways will help temper the loss of the graduating Big Three."

On November 1, the team played a scrimmage against Division III Randolph–Macon College.

== Regular season ==
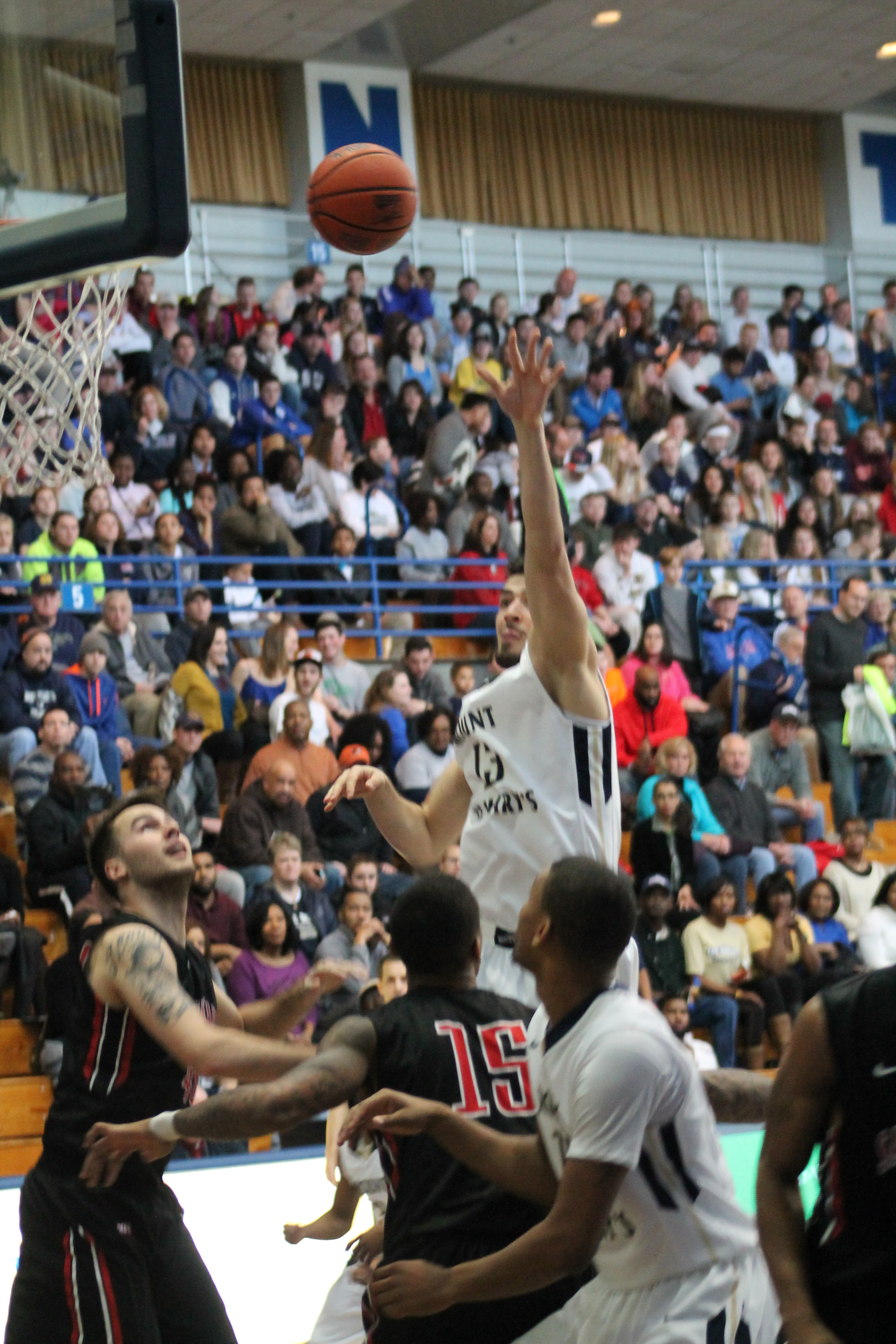
Kristijan Krajina shoots during a game against Saint Francis (PA) at the Knott Arena on January 24.

=== Non-conference play ===
==== November ====
Mount St. Mary's began the season on November 14 with a 78–55 loss on the road against the #2-ranked team in the nation, Arizona. The Mountaineers were within seven points with 11 minutes to play before fading down the stretch.

The Mountaineers dropped their home opener against Maryland Eastern Shore, 53–41, to fall to 0–2 on the season. Byron Ashe led the Mountaineers with nine points as the team shot just 29.8 percent (14 of 47) from the field.

The Mountaineers got their first win of the season with a 73–69 win on the road against Bucknell. Gregory Graves led the way with 16 points and seven rebounds.

On the day before Thanksgiving, the Mountaineers suffered a 34-point loss to ACC opponent Wake Forest to fall to 1–3 on the season. Walk-on player Liam MacManimon led Mount St. Mary's with 10 points.

==== December ====
Mount St. Mary's fell to 1–4 on the season a 23-point loss to Seton Hall on December 2. The Pirates took a 30–19 lead in the game's first 12 minutes and never looked back.

In the 170th meeting of a rivalry dubbed the Catholic Clash, the Mountaineers defeated Loyola. With the win, in which the Mountaineers shot 11-of-19 from three-point range, Mount St. Mary's took a 98–72 all-time lead in the series.

Mount St. Mary's then faced their second ranked opponent of the season, #25 Notre Dame, and fell to 2–5 with a 93–67 loss. Chris Martin led the Mountaineers with 19 points, including 5-of-9 from three-point range.

The Mountaineers got their first home win of the season on December 13 with a 67–64 overtime victory over Norfolk State. Taylor Danaher sealed the win by blocking a three-point shot in the waning seconds.

American defeated the Mountaineers 46–45 on December 20 on a last-second tip-in, dropping the Mountaineers to 3–6 on the season. Mount St. Mary's outrebounded the Eagles 35–27, but they shot only 34 percent (17-of-50) from the field.

The Mountaineers nearly lost a home game to one of the worst teams in Division I, Binghamton, before escaping with a 69–68 win. The game marked the home debut of transfer Andrew Smeathers, and he hit two free throws with 2.9 seconds to play to give the Mountaineers the win.

On December 29, the Mountaineers were defeated 69–35 by Conference USA's Old Dominion to finish non-conference play with a record of 4–7. In the game, the Mountaineers shot just 22 percent from the field (including 3-of-23 from three-point range) and had more turnovers (14) than field goals made (11).

=== Northeast Conference play ===
==== January ====
The Mountaineers started conference play with two consecutive losses: a 70–45 loss to Robert Morris and a double-overtime loss to Wagner. The team soundly defeated Central Connecticut, 82–51, on January 8 for its first conference win of the season. Another home victory, over conference-leading St. Francis Brooklyn, followed two days later.

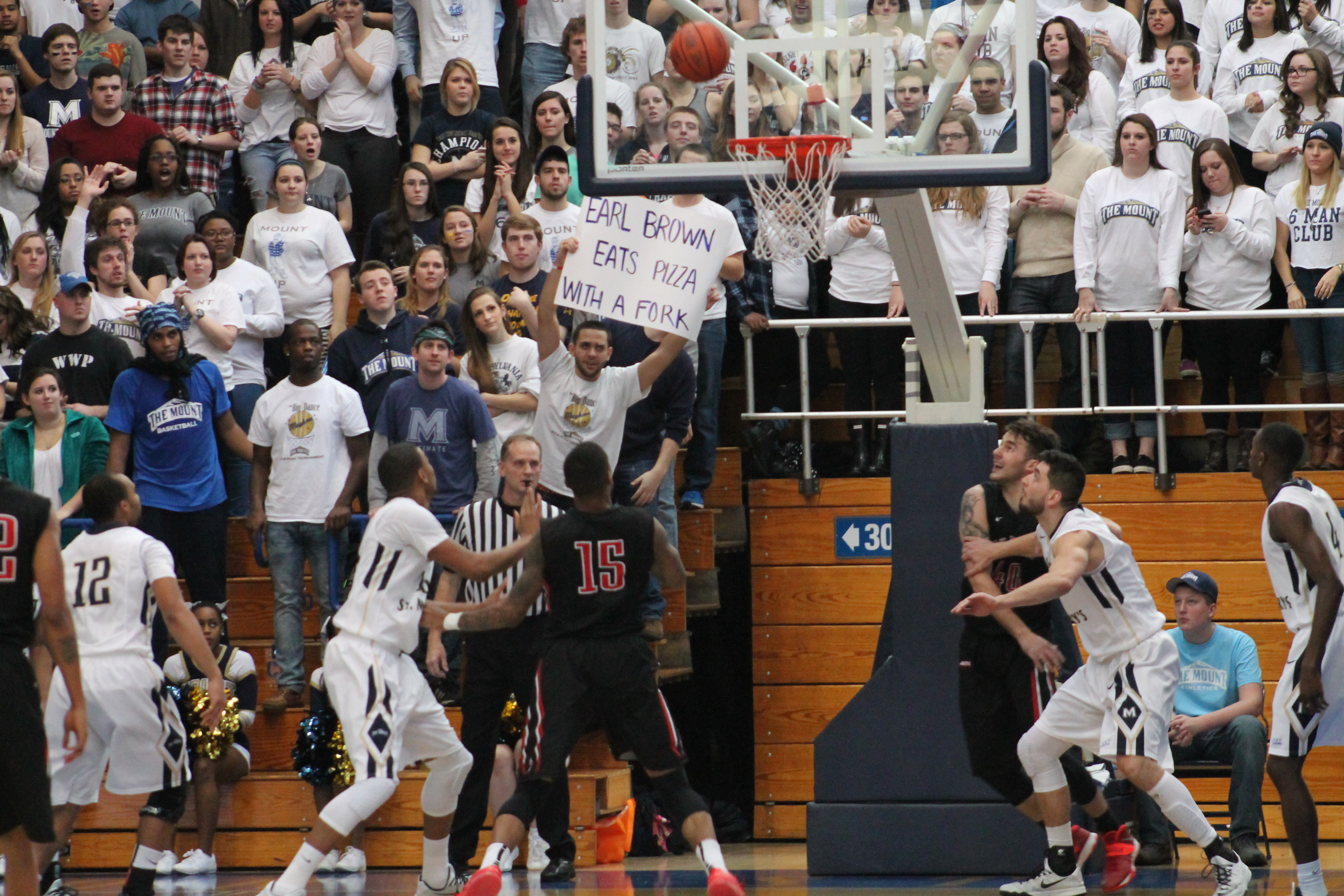
The Mount St. Mary's student section taunts Saint Francis (PA) player Earl Brown (15) during a game at the Knott Arena on January 24.

The Mountaineers' winning streak continued with a 20-point road victory over Fairleigh Dickinson and a 61–54 defeat of LIU Brooklyn in the Barclays Center, during which the Mountaineers overcame a 21-point first-half deficit. The winning streak was halted by a 63–59 overtime loss to Robert Morris, who completed a season sweep of the Mountaineers with the victory.

After beating Saint Francis (PA) on January 24, the Mountaineers were defeated in overtime in their rematch with St. Francis Brooklyn. They then defeated Sacred Heart on January 31 to finish the month with a 6–4 conference record, 10–11 overall.

==== February ====
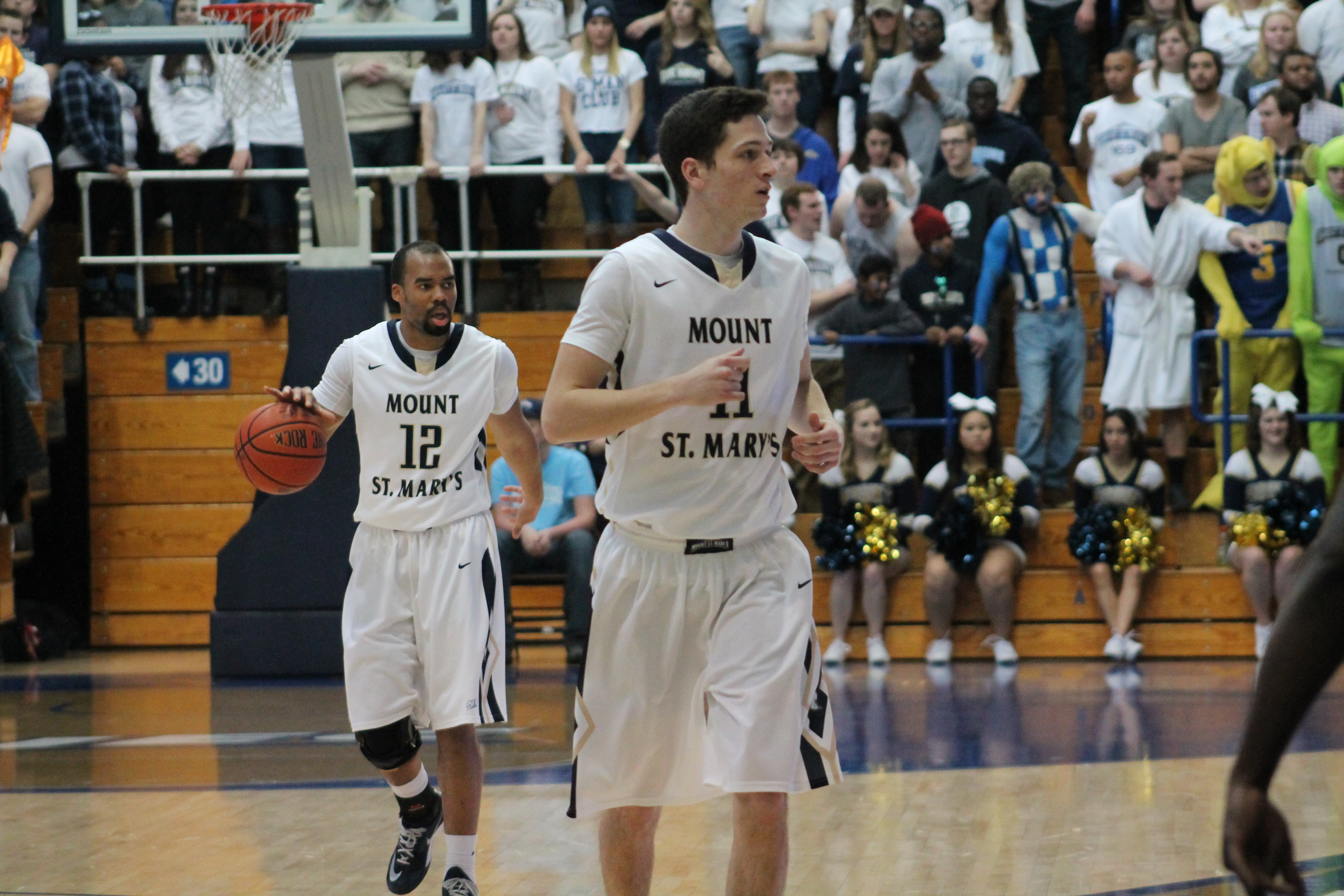
Mount St. Mary's players Charles Glover, left, and Will Miller move down the court during a game against Saint Francis (PA) at the Knott Arena on January 24.

The Mountaineers fell to 6–5 in conference play February 5 when their late comeback fell short and they lost to Bryant, 55–53. For the third consecutive time, however, the team followed a loss with a victory, defeating Central Connecticut for the second time on the season, 63–46.

In their return home after a four-game road trip, the Mountaineers were defeated by Sacred Heart, 62–55, on February 12. Two days later, led by a career-high 24 points from Byron Ashe, the team got a victory at home over Bryant, 75–68. On February 19, the Mountaineers got 54 points off their bench and improved to the .500 mark (13–13) for the first time on the season with an 82–65 win over LIU Brooklyn. On February 21, Mount St. Mary's pulled into a three-way tie for second place in the conference at 10–6 after defeating Fairleigh Dickinson, 75–64.

On February 26, despite a loss on the road to Saint Francis (PA), the Mountaineers clinched a home game in the first round of the conference tournament. On February 28, Mount St. Mary's beat Wagner, 74–64, to finish the regular season with a record of 15–14 (11–7 in conference play).

== Conference Tournament ==
Mount St. Mary's qualified for the NEC tournament as the No. 4 seed. Big Apple Buckets ran 10,000 simulations of the conference tournament prior to its start, giving the Mountaineers a 27% chance of reaching the championship game and an 11% chance of winning the title.

In the quarterfinals at Knott Arena on March 4, the Mountaineers lost 73–58 to Saint Francis (PA), the No. 5 seed, and were eliminated from the tournament. It marked only the third time Mount St. Mary's lost an NEC Tournament game at home, and the first time since 2006. In addition, it was the first time the Mountaineers lost to Saint Francis (PA) at the Knott Arena since 2004.

Speaking after the game, Christian said "I think a little bit of our inexperience did hit us."

== Postseason ==
Three teams from the NEC were given bids to postseason tournaments; however, Mount St. Mary's was not one. Robert Morris went to the NCAA tournament as winners of the conference tournament; St. Francis Brooklyn went to the NIT as regular-season NEC champions; and Saint Francis (PA) was awarded a bid to the CIT.

Martin transferred again following the season, this time to Savannah State University. Smeathers also left the program after the season, citing injuries.

== Awards ==
On March 3, the Northeast Conference officially named Byron Ashe and Gregory Graves to its All-Conference Third Team, saying Ashe's "emergence as a legitimate scoring and outside shooting threat gave Mount St. Mary's the spark it needed this season as the team looked to fill the void left by the graduation of three 1,000-point scorers" and Graves was a "much-improved offensive contributor this season (who) handles much of the dirty work inside for the Mount and its "Mayhem" approach." Junior Robinson, who "already has proven to be a big time player for the Mount after assuming the starting point guard spot from game one", was named to the All-Conference Rookie Team.

Big Apple Buckets also named Ashe and Graves to its NEC All-Conference Third Team, saying Ashe "emerged as a better player and the Mount’s go-to-scorer, posting double-digit point totals in nine of his last 10 games", while Graves displayed "dominance on the boards, as he impressively grabbed 9.6% and 21.2% of the offensive and defensive rebounds." The site also named Robinson to its NEC All-Conference Rookie Team, saying he "utilized his elite speed and quickness to post double-digits in scoring for half of his conference games."

Ashe was also named Second Team All-District by the National Association of Basketball Coaches.

== Media ==
Mountaineers home games and select road games were broadcast on WTHU 1450 AM in Thurmont, Maryland. Play-by-play was by Adam Pohl, with color commentary by Roy Sigler.

Live streaming video of all conference games and out-of-conference home games was available at www.necfrontrow.com.

== Schedule ==
Date time, TV	Opponent	Result	Record	High points	High rebounds	High assists	Site (attendance) city, state
Regular season
11/14/2014*; 8:00 pm, P12N	at No. 2 Arizona	L 55–78	0–1	13 – Krajina	6 – Graves	4 – Robinson	McKale Center (14,655); Tucson, AZ
11/19/2014*; 7:00 pm	Maryland Eastern Shore	L 41–53	0–2	9 – Ashe	6 – Wray	4 – Robinson	Knott Arena (1,315); Emmitsburg, MD
11/22/2014*; 7:00 pm	at Bucknell	W 73–69	1–2	16 – Graves, Krajina	7 – Graves	2 – Danaher, Graves, Robinson	Sojka Pavilion (3,027); Lewisburg, PA
11/26/2014*; 7:00 pm, ESPN3	at Wake Forest	L 49–83	1–3	10 – MacManimon	5 – Krajina	4 – Robinson	Lawrence Joel Veterans Memorial Coliseum (7,166); Winston-Salem, NC
12/2/2014*; 7:00 pm, FS2	at Seton Hall	L 55–78	1–4	13 – Miller	5 – Krajina	6 – Robinson	Prudential Center (5,912); Newark, NJ
12/6/2014*; 7:00 pm, MASN	at Loyola (MD); Catholic Clash	W 74–65	2–4	16 – Ashe	9 – Graves	4 – Robinson	Reitz Arena (1,147); Baltimore, MD
12/9/2014*; 7:00 pm, ESPN3	at No. 25 Notre Dame	L 67–93	2–5	19 – Martin	5 – Sallah	5 – Robinson	Edmund P. Joyce Center (6,647); Notre Dame, IN
12/13/2014*; 2:00 pm	Norfolk State	W 67–64 ^{OT}	3–5	15 – Ashe	11 – Graves	5 – Robinson	Knott Arena (1,345); Emmitsburg, MD
12/20/2014*; 1:00 pm, CSN	at American	L 45–46	3–6	8 – Graves, Smeathers	12 – Danaher	2 – Miller	Bender Arena (1,932); Washington, DC
12/22/2014*; 7:00 pm	Binghamton	W 69–68	4–6	18 – Martin	8 – Martin	5 – Robinson	Knott Arena (1,460); Emmitsburg, MD
12/29/2014*; 8:00 pm, ASN	at Old Dominion	L 35–69	4–7	12 – Smeathers	8 – Danaher	1 – Danaher, Martin, Nwandu	Ted Constant Convocation Center (8,152); Norfolk, VA
01/03/2015; 4:00 pm	at Robert Morris	L 45–70	4–8 (0–1)	14 – Graves, Smeathers	11 – Graves	2 – Graves, Smeathers	Charles L. Sewall Center (541); Moon Township, PA
01/05/2015; 7:00 pm	at Wagner	L 83–85 ^{2OT}	4–9 (0–2)	26 – Graves	12 – Graves	3 – Glover, Smeathers	Spiro Sports Center (1,223); Staten Island, NY
01/08/2015; 7:00 pm	Central Connecticut	W 82–51	5–9 (1–2)	22 – Martin	6 – Nwandu, Smeathers	5 – Robinson	Knott Arena (652); Emmitsburg, MD
01/10/2015; 2:00 pm	St. Francis Brooklyn	W 71–61	6–9 (2–2)	22 – Smeathers	7 – Graves	6 – Nwandu, Robinson	Knott Arena (881); Emmitsburg, MD
01/15/2015; 7:00 pm	at Fairleigh Dickinson	W 71–51	7–9 (3–2)	21 – Ashe, Graves	10 – Graves	5 – Nwandu	Rothman Center (712); Hackensack, NJ
01/17/2015; 2:30 pm	at LIU Brooklyn	W 61–54	8–9 (4–2)	15 – Martin	8 – Graves	5 – Robinson	Barclays Center (2,032); Brooklyn, NY
01/22/2015; 7:00 pm	Robert Morris	L 59–63 ^{OT}	8–10 (4–3)	16 – Graves	8 – Graves	5 – Nwandu, Robinson	Knott Arena (1,434); Emmitsburg, MD
01/24/2015; 2:30 pm	Saint Francis (PA)	W 52–40	9–10 (5–3)	10 – Robinson	8 – Graves	3 – Glover	Knott Arena (2,524); Emmitsburg, MD
01/29/2015; 7:00 pm	at St. Francis Brooklyn	L 67–73 ^{OT}	9–11 (5–4)	22 – Robinson	7 – Graves, Krajina	3 – Nwandu	Generoso Pope Athletic Complex (465); Brooklyn, NY
01/31/2015; 2:00 pm, ESPN3	at Sacred Heart	W 77–71	10–11 (6–4)	21 – Ashe	13 – Graves	4 – Nwandu	William H. Pitt Center (1,261); Fairfield, CT
02/05/2015; 7:00 pm, ESPNU	at Bryant	L 53–55	10–12 (6–5)	14 – Graves	8 – Krajina	4 – Ashe	Chace Athletic Center (1,718); Smithfield, RI
02/07/2015; 3:30 pm	at Central Connecticut	W 63–46	11–12 (7–5)	16 – Martin	9 – Graves	4 – Graves	William H. Detrick Gymnasium (N/A); New Britain, CT
02/12/2015; 7:00 pm, MASN/ ESPN3	Sacred Heart	L 55–62	11–13 (7–6)	14 – Graves	6 – Graves	5 – Robinson	Knott Arena (1,109); Emmitsburg, MD
02/14/2015; 2:00 pm	Bryant	W 75–68	12–13 (8–6)	24 – Ashe	7 – Graves, Nwandu	5 – Robinson	Knott Arena (1,246); Emmitsburg, MD
02/19/2015; 7:00 pm	LIU Brooklyn	W 82–65	13–13 (9–6)	23 – Ashe	7 – Smeathers	4 – Robinson	Knott Arena (1,147); Emmitsburg, MD
02/21/2015; 2:00 pm	Fairleigh Dickinson	W 75–64	14–13 (10–6)	24 – Ashe	13 – Graves	5 – Ashe, Nwandu, Robinson	Knott Arena (674); Emmitsburg, MD
02/26/2015; 7:00 pm	at Saint Francis (PA)	L 60–63	14–14 (10–7)	15 – Ashe	10 – Krajina	5 – Graves	DeGol Arena (1,284); Loretto, PA
02/28/2015; 2:00 pm	Wagner	W 74–64	15–14 (11–7)	19 – Ashe	9 – Nwandu	4 – Glover	Knott Arena (1,308); Emmitsburg, MD
Northeast Conference tournament
03/04/2015; 7:00 pm	Saint Francis (PA); Quarterfinals	L 58–73	15–15	14 – Miller	5 – Danaher	3 – Nwandu	Knott Arena (1,068); Emmitsburg, MD
*Non-conference game. ^{#}Rankings from AP Poll. (#) Tournament seedings in parentheses. All times are in Eastern Time.

== Statistics ==
=== Players ===
Legend
GP	Games played	GS	Games started	MPG	Minutes per game
FG%	Field-goal percentage	3P%	3-point field-goal percentage	FT%	Free-throw percentage
RPG	Rebounds per game	APG	Assists per game	SPG	Steals per game
BPG	Blocks per game	PPG	Points per game	Source:

Player	GP	GS	MPG	FG%	3FG%	FT%	RPG	APG	SPG	BPG	PPG
Chris Martin	24	7	22.5	.360	.293	.813	2.5	0.8	0.6	0.0	7.4
Mawdo Sallah	15	3	6.6	.500	–	.000	1.2	0.1	0.0	0.7	0.7
Byron Ashe	28	4	25.6	.420	.360	.738	2.6	1.3	1.1	0.4	11.9
Junior Robinson	30	30	24.5	.362	.333	.753	1.4	3.3	0.9	0.1	8.2
Khalid Nwandu	29	13	19.7	.441	.250	.471	2.8	2.1	0.8	0.0	4.7
Liam MacManimon	11	0	2.2	.333	.308	.500	0.2	0.1	0.1	0.0	1.4
Will Miller	30	4	18.1	.381	.397	.714	1.1	0.5	0.4	0.1	5.6
Charles Glover	27	18	14.7	.255	.219	.818	1.0	1.0	0.5	0.1	2.0
Kristijan Krajina	30	30	21.7	.432	.120	.608	4.7	0.6	0.4	0.6	6.4
Gregory Graves	27	27	29.5	.423	.380	.692	7.4	1.3	1.3	0.5	10.1
Maalik Howard	9	0	2.1	.500	1.000	–	0.2	0.1	0.0	0.0	0.3
Troy Henderson	0	0	–	–	–	–	–	–	–	–	–
Andrew Smeathers	14	8	22.7	.339	.321	.840	4.0	1.0	0.6	0.4	8.7
Aaron Brown	10	1	2.6	.222	.000	–	0.8	0.2	0.1	0.1	0.4
Chris Wray	18	1	6.4	.588	–	.333	1.3	0.0	0.4	0.3	1.2
Chris Manning	0	0	–	–	–	–	–	–	–	–	–
Taylor Danaher	30	4	19.2	.568	.333	.756	3.8	0.5	0.5	1.3	4.5

==== NEC Leaders ====
Scoring

- Byron Ashe (11.9/game): 14th
- Gregory Graves (10.1/game): 21st

Rebounding

- Gregory Graves (7.4/game): 7th
- Kristijan Krajina (4.7/game): 17th

Field Goal Percentage (minimum 3 made per game)

- Gregory Graves (.423): 14th
- Byron Ashe (.420): 15th

Assists

- Junior Robinson (3.27/game): 9th
- Khalid Nwandu (2.10/game): 17th

Steals

- Gregory Graves (1.26/game): 10th

3-Point Field Goal Percentage (minimum 1 made per game)

- Will Miller (.397): 4th
- Byron Ashe (.360): 9th

3-Point Field Goals Made

- Byron Ashe (1.93/game): 8th
- Will Miller (1.60/game): 11th

Blocked Shots

- Taylor Danaher (1.27/game): 5th
- Kristijan Krajina (0.60/game): 12th
- Gregory Graves (0.52/game): 14th

Assist/Turnover Ratio (minimum 3 assists/game)

- Junior Robinson (1.63): 5th

Offensive Rebounds

- Gregory Graves (2.41/game): 6th
- Kristijan Krajina (1.83/game): 15th

Defensive Rebounds

- Gregory Graves (4.96/game): 4th

Minutes Played

- Gregory Graves (29.52/game): 23rd

To qualify, players must have appeared in 75% of team's games.

=== Team ===
The Mountaineers finished the season ranked ninth of the 10 teams in the Northeast Conference in points scored per game (63.1), and third of the 10 teams in fewest points allowed per game (64.8). The team led the league in 3-point field goals made per game (7.60).

The team was second in the Northeast Conference in home attendance, with an average of 1,243 fans per game attending contests at the Knott Arena. The team had the highest overall average attendance, playing in front of an average of 2,525 fans in its 30 games.
