= 2015 Northeast Conference men's basketball tournament =

- Classification: Division I
- Season: 2014–15
- Teams: 8
- Site: campus sites
- Finals site: Generoso Pope Athletic Complex; Brooklyn, New York
- Champions: Robert Morris (8th title)
- Winning coach: Andrew Toole (1st title)
- MVP: Rodney Pryor (RMU)
- Attendance: 6,891 (total); 1,013 (championship)

2014–15 Northeast Conference men's basketball standings
	Conf.				Overall
Team	W		L	PCT	W		L	PCT
St. Francis Brooklyn	15	–	3	.833	23	–	12	.657
Robert Morris †	12	–	6	.667	20	–	15	.571
Bryant	12	–	6	.667	16	–	15	.516
Mount St. Mary's	11	–	7	.611	15	–	15	.500
Saint Francis	9	–	9	.500	16	–	16	.500
Sacred Heart	9	–	9	.500	15	–	17	.469
LIU Brooklyn	8	–	10	.444	12	–	18	.400
Wagner	8	–	10	.444	10	–	20	.333
Fairleigh Dickinson	3	–	15	.167	8	–	21	.276
Central Connecticut	3	–	15	.167	5	–	26	.161
† 2015 NEC tournament winner

The 2015 Northeast Conference men's basketball tournament was held on March 4, 7, and 10. The tournament featured the league's top eight seeds, with higher seed hosting all games. The tourney opened on Wednesday, March 4 with the quarterfinals, followed by the semifinals on Saturday, March 7 and the finals on Tuesday, March 10. Robert Morris earned the conference's automatic bid to the 2015 NCAA tournament.

== Format ==
For the eleventh straight year, the NEC Men's Basketball Tournament consisted of an eight-team playoff format with all games played at the home of the higher seed. After the quarterfinals, the teams were shuffled so the highest remaining seed plays the lowest remaining seed in the semifinals.

== Seeds ==
Teams were seeded based on the final regular season standings, with ties broken under NEC policy.

Seed	School	Conference	Overall	Tiebreaker
1	St. Francis Brooklyn‡	15–3	21–10	
2	Robert Morris	12–6	16–14	1–1 vs. SFBK, 1–1 vs. Bryant, 2–0 vs. MSM
3	Bryant	12–6	15–14	1–1 vs. SFBK, 1–1 vs. RM, 1–1 vs. MSM
4	Mount St. Mary's	11–7	15–14	
5	Saint Francis (PA)	9–9	15–14	2–0 vs. SH
6	Sacred Heart	9–9	15–16	0–2 vs. SFPA
7	Wagner	8–10	10–19	2–0 vs. LIU
8	LIU Brooklyn	8–10	12–17	0–2 vs. Wagner
‡ – NEC regular season champions. Overall records are as of the end of the regular season.

== Bracket ==
Quarterfinals; Wednesday, March 4 NEC Front Row, MSG+2, FCS and Cox Sports
1	St. Francis Brooklyn	79
8	LIU Brooklyn	70
4	Mount St. Mary's	58
5	Saint Francis (PA)	73
(Pairings are reseeded after the first round)
2	Robert Morris	91
7	Wagner	68
3	Bryant	91**
6	Sacred Heart	85

Semifinals; Saturday, March 7 (reseeded); NEC Front Row, MSG+, FCS
1	St. Francis Brooklyn	62
5	Saint Francis (PA)	48
2	Robert Morris	66
3	Bryant	53

Championship; Tuesday, March 10; ESPN2
1	St. Francis Brooklyn	63
2	Robert Morris	66

All games will be played at the venue of the higher seed
* Overtime

== Game summaries ==
=== Quarterfinals: St. Francis Brooklyn vs. LIU Brooklyn ===
Series History: LIU leads 63-40

Mar 4
7:00 pm EST

Recap

St. Francis Brooklyn Terriers 79, LIU Brooklyn Blackbirds 70
Scoring by half: 35-22, 44-48
Pts: Brent Jones 31; Rebs: Jalen Cannon 15; Asts: Brent Jones 5	Pts: Landon Atterberry 18; Rebs: Nura Zanna 7 Asts: Elvar Fridriksson 7

Generoso Pope Athletic Complex
Brooklyn, NY
Attendance: 972
Referees: Wally Rutecki, Dennis Allocco and Brandon Cruz

=== Quarterfinals: Mount St. Mary's vs. Saint Francis (PA) ===
Series History: MSM leads 42-30

Mar 4
7:00 pm EST

Recap

Mount St. Mary's Mountaineers 58, Saint Francis Red Flash 73
Scoring by half: 24-29, 34-44
Pts: Will Miller 14; Rebs: Taylor Danaher 5 Asts: Khalid Nwandu 3	Pts: Earl Brown 20; Rebs: Earl Brown 14; Asts: Malik Harmon & Ollie Jackson 3

Knott Arena
Emmitsburg, MD
Attendance: 1,068
Referees: Doug Aprahamian, Robert Testa and Brandon Williams

=== Quarterfinals: Robert Morris vs. Wagner ===
Series History: RMU leads 41-25

Mar 4
7:00 pm EST

Recap

Robert Morris Colonials 91, Wagner Seahawks 68
Scoring by half: 39-28, 52-40
Pts: Lucky Jones 27; Rebs: Elijah Minnie 7 Asts: Rodney Pryor 7	Pts: Mike Aaman & Marcus Burton 19; Rebs: Mike Aaman 8 Asts: JoJo Cooper 5

Charles L. Sewall Center
Moon Township, PA
Attendance: 857
Referees: Steve Ruppenthal, Josh White and Dave Fernandez

=== Quarterfinals: Bryant vs. Sacred Heart ===
Series History: SHU leads 18-13
Announcers: Paul Dottino, Joe DeSantis and John Schmeelk

MSG+, FCS and Cox Sports

Mar 4
7:00 pm EST

Recap

Bryant Bulldogs 91, Sacred Heart Pioneers 85 (OT)
Scoring by half: 30-38, 33-25 Overtime: 14-14, 14-8
Pts: Joe O'Shea 21; Rebs: Dan Garvin & Bosko Kostur 9 Asts: Shane McLaughlin 5	Pts: Cane Broome 21; Rebs: Jordan Allen 6 Asts: Phil Gaetano 9

Chace Athletic Center
Smithfield, RI
Attendance: 1,188
Referees: Gary Pucino, Rod Mrakovich and Mike Pearson

=== Semifinal: Robert Morris vs. Bryant ===
Series History: RMU leads 10–2
Announcers: John Schmeelk and Tim Capstraw

MSG & FCS

Mar 7
12:00 pm EST

Recap

Robert Morris Colonials 66, Bryant Bulldogs 53
Scoring by half: 30-25, 36-28
Pts: Kavon Stewart 19; Rebs: Elijah Minnie 9 Asts: Kavon Stewart 8	Pts: Dyami Starks 19; Rebs: Dan Garvin and Shane McLaughlin 8 Asts: Shane McLaughlin 7

Charles L. Sewall Center
Moon Township, PA
Attendance: 839
Referees: Jim Bruno, Lionel Butler and James Ostwalt

=== Semifinal: St. Francis Brooklyn vs. Saint Francis (PA) ===
Series History: SFU leads 36–38
Announcers: Paul Dottino, Joe DeSantis and Matt Harmon

MSG & FCS

Mar 7
2:00 pm EST

Recap

St. Francis Brooklyn Terriers 62, Saint Francis Red Flash 48
Scoring by half: 30-27, 32-21
Pts: Jalen Cannon 20; Rebs: Jalen Cannon 11; Asts: Brent Jones 8	Pts: Malik Harmon 18; Rebs: Earl Brown 12; Asts: Greg Brown 3

Generoso Pope Athletic Complex
Brooklyn, NY
Attendance: 954
Referees: Guy Pagano, Douglas Grant and Tom Regan

=== Championship: St. Francis Brooklyn vs. Robert Morris ===
Series History: 43–27
Announcers: John Brickley and Craig Robinson

ESPN2

Mar 10
7:00 pm EST

Recap

St. Francis Brooklyn Terriers 63, Robert Morris Colonials 66
Scoring by half: 35-29, 28-37
Pts: Tyreek Jewell 19; Rebs: Jalen Cannon 12; Asts: Brent Jones 5	Pts: Rodney Pryor 17; Rebs: Elijah Minnie 9 Asts: Kavon Stewart 6

Generoso Pope Athletic Complex
Brooklyn, NY
Attendance: 1,013
Referees: Paul Faia, Robert Riley and Donnie Eppley

== All-tournament team ==
Tournament MVP in bold.

Name	School	Pos.	Year	Ht.	Hometown
**Rodney Prior**	Robert Morris	Guard	Junior	6-5	Evanston, Illinois
Brent Jones	St. Francis Brooklyn	Guard	Senior	6-2	Bronx, New York
Earl Brown	Saint Francis (PA)	Forward	Senior	6-6	Philadelphia, Pennsylvania
Lucky Jones	Robert Morris	Forward	Senior	6-5	Newark, New Jersey
Jalen Cannon	St. Francis Brooklyn	Forward	Senior	6-6	Allentown, Pennsylvania
