= 2014–15 Bryant Bulldogs men's basketball team =

American college basketball season

2014–15 Bryant Bulldogs men's basketball
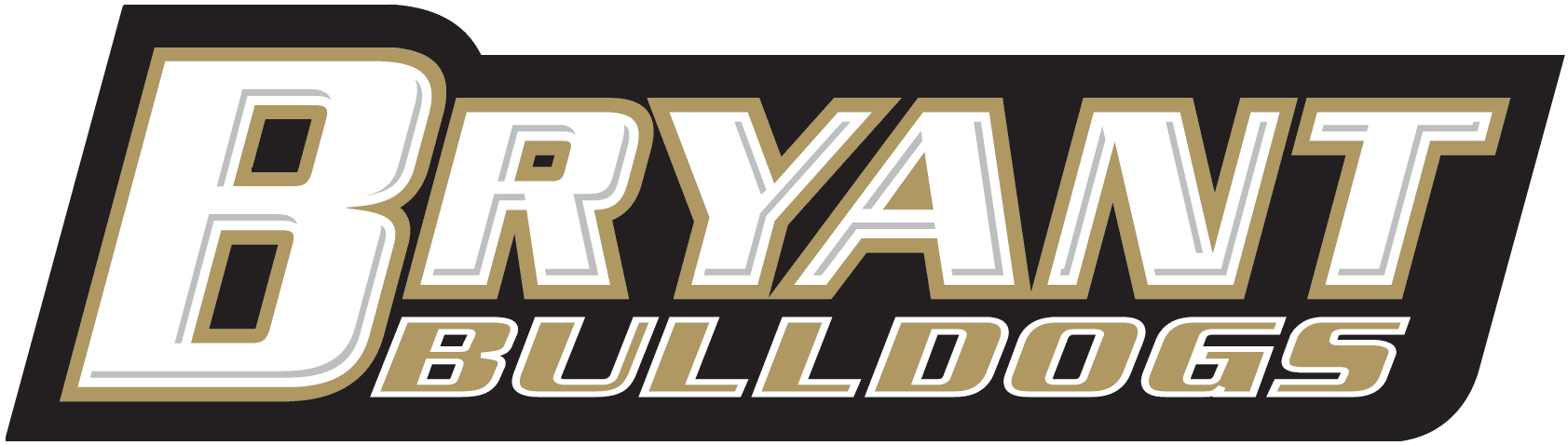
- Conference: Northeast Conference
- Record: 16–15 (12–6 NEC)
- Head coach: Tim O'Shea (7th season)
- Assistant coaches: Happy Dobbs; Al Skinner; Chris Burns
- Home arena: Chace Athletic Center

2014–15 Northeast Conference men's basketball standings
	Conf.				Overall
Team	W		L	PCT	W		L	PCT
St. Francis Brooklyn	15	–	3	.833	23	–	12	.657
Robert Morris †	12	–	6	.667	20	–	15	.571
Bryant	12	–	6	.667	16	–	15	.516
Mount St. Mary's	11	–	7	.611	15	–	15	.500
Saint Francis	9	–	9	.500	16	–	16	.500
Sacred Heart	9	–	9	.500	15	–	17	.469
LIU Brooklyn	8	–	10	.444	12	–	18	.400
Wagner	8	–	10	.444	10	–	20	.333
Fairleigh Dickinson	3	–	15	.167	8	–	21	.276
Central Connecticut	3	–	15	.167	5	–	26	.161
† 2015 NEC tournament winner

The 2014–2015 Bryant Bulldogs men's basketball team represented Bryant University during the 2014–15 NCAA Division I men's basketball season. The team was led by seventh year head coach Tim O'Shea and played their home games at the Chace Athletic Center. They were members of the Northeast Conference. They finished the season 16–15, 12–6 in NEC play to finish in a tie for second place. They advanced to the semifinals of the NEC tournament where they lost to Robert Morris.

== Roster ==
Number	Name	Position	Height	Weight	Year	Hometown
0	Zach Chionuma	Guard	6–5	185	RS–Junior	Jamesville, New York
1	Hunter Ware	Guard	6–2	170	Freshman	Powder Springs, Georgia
2	Blake McBride	Guard	6–5	195	Freshman	Ladera Ranch, California
3	Bosko Kostur	Guard/Forward	6–7	200	Sophomore	Melbourne, Australia
4	Shane McLaughlin	Guard	6–1	185	Junior	Old Tappan, New Jersey
5	Terrill Toe	Guard	6–0	165	Sophomore	Providence, Rhode Island
10	Joe O'Shea	Guard	6–4	190	Senior	Burlington, Vermont
11	Justin Brickman	Guard	5–9	155	Sophomore	San Antonio, Texas
12	Dyami Starks	Guard	6–2	195	Senior	Duluth, Minnesota
14	Andrew Scocca	Forward	6–8	235	Sophomore	Melrose, Massachusetts
15	Ellis Williams	Forward	6–8	250	Sophomore	Columbus, Ohio
20	Angus Riley	Forward/Center	6–8	225	Freshman	Nelson, New Zealand
22	Dan Garvin	Forward	6–6	205	Sophomore	Bethel, Connecticut
23	Jalen Archie-Davis	Guard	6–0	165	Freshman	Johns Creek, Georgia
34	Curtis Oakley	Forward	6–4	215	Junior	South Euclid, Ohio

== Schedule ==
Date time, TV	Opponent	Result	Record	Site (attendance) city, state
Regular season
11/14/2014*; 4:00 pm, SNY	at No. 17 UConn	L 53–66	0–1	Harry A. Gampel Pavilion (10,167); Storrs, CT
11/20/2014*; 7:00 pm	New Hampshire	W 72–63	1–1	Chace Athletic Center (1,422); Smithfield, RI
11/26/2014*; 7:00 pm	at Vermont	L 47–73	1–2	Patrick Gym (1,906); Burlington, VT
11/30/2014*; 5:00 pm	at Akron	L 66–72	1–3	James A. Rhodes Arena (2,486); Akron, OH
12/03/2014*; 7:30 pm	Yale	L 60–67	1–4	Chace Athletic Center (732); Smithfield, RI
12/06/2014*; 7:30 pm	at Brown	L 62–69	1–5	Pizzitola Sports Center (623); Providence, RI
12/09/2014*; 7:00 pm	at Army	W 80–73	2–5	Christl Arena (541); West Point, NY
12/21/2014*; 3:00 pm	at Denver	W 48–46	3–5	Magness Arena (1,318); Denver, CO
12/31/2014*; 1:00 pm	Dartmouth	L 59–76	3–6	Chace Athletic Center (804); Smithfield, RI
01/03/2015; 4:30 pm	at LIU Brooklyn	W 67–63	4–6 (1–0)	Steinberg Wellness Center (1,143); Brooklyn, NY
01/05/2015; 4:00 pm	at St. Francis Brooklyn	L 47–63	4–7 (1–1)	Generoso Pope Athletic Complex (389); Brooklyn, NY
01/08/2015; 7:00 pm	Saint Francis (PA)	W 80–54	5–7 (2–1)	Chace Athletic Center (603); Smithfield, RI
01/10/2015; 4:00 pm	Fairleigh Dickinson	W 73–60	6–7 (3–1)	Chace Athletic Center (427); Smithfield, RI
01/15/2015; 7:00 pm	Wagner	W 81–73	7–7 (4–1)	Chace Athletic Center (347); Smithfield, RI
01/17/2015; 3:30 pm	at Central Connecticut	W 70–54	8–7 (5–1)	William H. Detrick Gymnasium (N/A); New Britain, CT
01/20/2015*; 7:00 pm	Harvard	L 57–66	8–8	Chace Athletic Center (1,246); Smithfield, RI
01/22/2015; 7:00 pm	LIU Brooklyn	W 74–69	9–8 (6–1)	Chace Athletic Center (947); Smithfield, RI
01/24/2015; 4:00 pm	Sacred Heart	L 66–83	9–9 (6–2)	Chace Athletic Center (782); Smithfield, RI
01/29/2015; 7:00 pm	at Saint Francis (PA)	L 68–75	9–10 (6–3)	DeGol Arena (952); Loretto, PA
01/31/2015; 4:00 pm	at Robert Morris	W 71–68	10–10 (7–3)	Charles L. Sewall Center (1,172); Moon Township, PA
02/02/2015*; 7:00 pm, ESPN3	at Pittsburgh	L 67–72	10–11	Petersen Events Center (7,749); Pittsburgh, PA
02/05/2015; 7:00 pm, ESPNU	Mount St. Mary's	W 55–53	11–11 (8–3)	Chace Athletic Center (1,718); Smithfield, RI
02/07/2015; 3:30 pm	at Sacred Heart	L 75–84 ^{OT}	11–12 (8–4)	William H. Pitt Center (1,002); Fairfield, CT
02/12/2015; 7:00 pm	at Fairleigh Dickinson	W 74–71	12–12 (9–4)	Rothman Center (613); Hackensack, NJ
02/14/2015; 2:00 pm	at Mount St. Mary's	L 68–75	12–13 (9–5)	Knott Arena (1,246); Emmitsburg, MD
02/19/2015; 7:00 pm	at Wagner	W 66–65	13–13 (10–5)	Spiro Sports Center (1,402); Staten Island, NY
02/21/2015; 4:00 pm	Robert Morris	L 70–76	13–14 (10–6)	Chace Athletic Center (908); Smithfield, RI
02/26/2015; 7:00 pm	Central Connecticut	W 77–69	14–14 (11–6)	Chace Athletic Center (932); Smithfield, RI
02/28/2015; 4:00 pm	at St. Francis Brooklyn	W 61–51	15–14 (12–6)	Chace Athletic Center (1,052); Smithfield, RI
NEC tournament
03/04/2015; 7:00 pm, MSG+/FCS/Cox Sports	Sacred Heart; Quarterfinals	W 91–85 ^{2OT}	16–14	Chace Athletic Center (1,188); Smithfield, RI
03/07/2015; 12:00 pm, FCS/MSG	at Robert Morris; Semifinals	L 53–66	16–15	Charles L. Sewall Center (839); Moon Township, PA
*Non-conference game. ^{#}Rankings from AP Poll. (#) Tournament seedings in parentheses. All times are in Eastern Time..
