= 2014–15 Central Connecticut Blue Devils men's basketball team =

American college basketball season

2014–15 Central Connecticut Blue Devils men's basketball
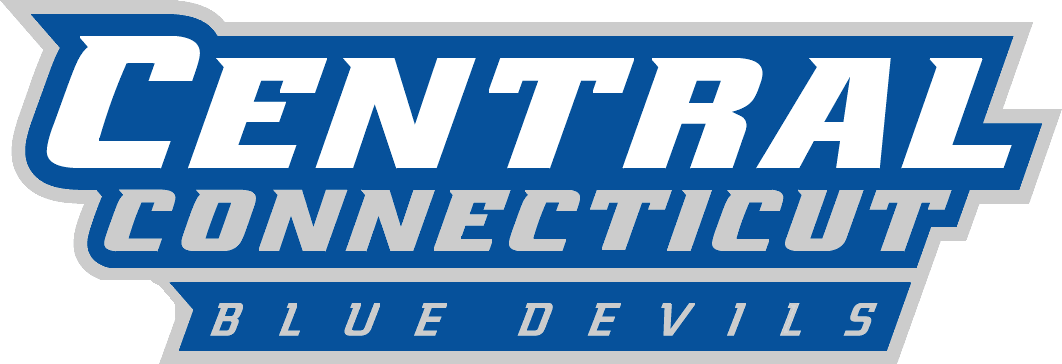
- Conference: Northeast Conference
- Record: 5–26 (3–15 NEC)
- Head coach: Howie Dickenman (19th season)
- Assistant coaches: Greg Collucci; Tobe Carberry; Jamaal Wagner; Obie Nwadike
- Home arena: William H. Detrick Gymnasium

2014–15 Northeast Conference men's basketball standings
	Conf.				Overall
Team	W		L	PCT	W		L	PCT
St. Francis Brooklyn	15	–	3	.833	23	–	12	.657
Robert Morris †	12	–	6	.667	20	–	15	.571
Bryant	12	–	6	.667	16	–	15	.516
Mount St. Mary's	11	–	7	.611	15	–	15	.500
Saint Francis	9	–	9	.500	16	–	16	.500
Sacred Heart	9	–	9	.500	15	–	17	.469
LIU Brooklyn	8	–	10	.444	12	–	18	.400
Wagner	8	–	10	.444	10	–	20	.333
Fairleigh Dickinson	3	–	15	.167	8	–	21	.276
Central Connecticut	3	–	15	.167	5	–	26	.161
† 2015 NEC tournament winner

The 2014–15 Central Connecticut Blue Devils men's basketball team represented Central Connecticut State University during the 2014–15 NCAA Division I men's basketball season. The Blue Devils, led by 19th year head coach Howie Dickenman, played their home games at the William H. Detrick Gymnasium and were members of the Northeast Conference. They finished the season 5–26, 3–15 in NEC play to finish in a tie for ninth place. They failed to qualify for the NEC Tournament.

== Roster ==
Number	Name	Position	Height	Weight	Year	Hometown
1	Kyle Vinales	Guard	6–1	180	Senior	Detroit, Michigan
2	Juwan Newmen	Forward	6–8	215	Senior	Baltimore, Maryland
3	Mustafa Jones	Forward	6–7	180	Freshman	Harlem, New York
5	Kevin Seymour	Guard	6–0	175	Freshman	Bronx, New York
10	Corey Barrett	Forward	6–9	215	Junior	Minneapolis, Minnesota
11	Malcolm McMillan	Guard	6–0	180	Senior	Baltimore, Maryland
12	Khalen Kumberlander	Guard	6–3	185	Sophomore	Washington, D.C.
13	Greg Andrade	Guard	6–0	180	Senior	Windsor, Connecticut
15	Shakaris Laney	Guard	6–4	200	Freshman	Philadelphia, Pennsylvania
21	Matt Mobley	Guard	6–1	175	Sophomore	Worcester, Massachusetts
22	Faronte Drakeford	Forward	6–7	215	Senior	Wilmington, North Carolina
34	Brandon Peel	Forward	6–7	200	Junior	Forestville, Maryland

== Schedule ==
Date time, TV	Opponent	Result	Record	Site (attendance) city, state
Regular season
11/14/2014*; 3:00 pm	vs. Fairfield; Connecticut 6 Classic	L 63–71	0–1	TD Bank Sports Center (1,100); Hamden, CT
11/17/2014*; 7:30 pm, ESPN3	at Maryland; CBE Hall of Fame Classic	L 57–93	0–2	Xfinity Center (8,612); College Park, MD
11/21/2014*; 5:00 pm	vs. Towson; CBE Hall of Fame Classic	L 49–58	0–3	Multipurpose Activity Center (1,428); West Long Branch, NJ
11/22/2014*; 7:30 pm	at Monmouth; CBE Hall of Fame Classic	L 50–65	0–4	Multipurpose Activity Center (1,357); West Long Branch, NJ
11/23/2014*; 2:00 pm	vs. Bethune-Cookman; CBE Hall of Fame Classic	L 60–65	0–5	Multipurpose Activity Center (1,225); West Long Branch, NJ
11/30/2014*; 3:00 pm	at East Carolina	L 59–74	0–6	Williams Arena at Minges Coliseum (3,705); Greenville, NC
12/03/2014*; 7:00 pm	at Rider	L 56–69	0–7	Alumni Gymnasium (1,515); Lawrenceville, NJ
12/06/2014*; 7:00 pm	at Hartford; Rivalry	W 56–47	1–7	Chase Arena at Reich Family Pavilion (1,579); Hartford, CT
12/10/2014*; 7:00 pm	UMBC	W 65–53	2–7	William H. Detrick Gymnasium (1,213); New Britain, CT
12/20/2014*; 7:00 pm	NJIT	L 76–84	2–8	William H. Detrick Gymnasium (1,117); New Britain, CT
12/22/2014*; 2:00 pm	Brown	L 55–67	2–9	William H. Detrick Gymnasium (1,012); New Britain, CT
12/28/2014*; 1:00 pm, SNY	at UConn	L 48–81	2–10	XL Center (13,315); Hartford, CT
12/31/2014*; 4:00 pm	Hofstra	L 56–84	2–11	William H. Detrick Gymnasium (917); New Britain, CT
01/03/2015; 3:30 pm	Fairleigh Dickinson	L 67–73	2–12 (0–1)	William H. Detrick Gymnasium (912); New Britain, CT
01/05/2015; 7:30 pm	at Sacred Heart	L 66–75	2–13 (0–2)	William H. Pitt Center (345); Fairfield, CT
01/08/2015; 7:00 pm	at Mount St. Mary's	L 51–82	2–14 (0–3)	Knott Arena (652); Emmitsburg, MD
01/10/2015; 3:30 pm	Robert Morris	L 60–72	2–15 (0–4)	William H. Detrick Gymnasium (927); New Britain, CT
01/15/2015; 7:00 pm	LIU Brooklyn	L 66–71	2–16 (0–5)	William H. Detrick Gymnasium (1,112); New Britain, CT
01/17/2015; 3:30 pm	Bryant	L 54–70	2–17 (0–6)	William H. Detrick Gymnasium (N/A); New Britain, CT
01/21/2015; 9:30 pm	at St. Francis Brooklyn	L 51–63	2–18 (0–7)	Madison Square Garden (7,532); New York, NY
01/24/2015; 3:30 pm	Wagner	W 53–50	3–18 (1–7)	William H. Detrick Gymnasium (1,050); New Britain, CT
01/29/2015; 7:00 pm	at LIU Brooklyn	L 55–67	3–19 (1–8)	Steinberg Wellness Center (1,431); Brooklyn, NY
01/31/2015; 4:00 pm	at Wagner	L 55–86	3–20 (1–9)	Spiro Sports Center (1,783); Staten Island, NY
02/05/2014; 7:00 pm	St. Francis Brooklyn	L 81–90	3–21 (1–10)	William H. Detrick Gymnasium (1,274); New Britain, CT
02/07/2015; 3:30 pm	Mount St. Mary's	L 46–63	3–22 (1–11)	William H. Detrick Gymnasium (N/A); New Britain, CT
02/12/2014; 7:00 pm	at Saint Francis (PA)	L 63–74	3–23 (1–12)	DeGol Arena (1,076); Loretto, PA
02/14/2015; 4:00 pm	at Robert Morris	L 52–53	3–24 (1–13)	Charles L. Sewall Center (721); Moon Township, PA
02/19/2015; 9:00 pm	Saint Francis (PA)	W 53–50	4–24 (2–13)	William H. Detrick Gymnasium (1,101); New Britain, CT
02/21/2015; 3:30 pm	Sacred Heart	W 76–73 ^{OT}	5–24 (3–13)	William H. Detrick Gymnasium (1,492); New Britain, CT
02/26/2015; 7:00 pm	at Bryant	L 69–77	5–25 (3–14)	Chace Athletic Center (932); Smithfield, RI
02/28/2014; 4:30 pm	at Fairleigh Dickinson	L 66–73	5–26 (3–15)	Rothman Center (639); Hackensack, NJ
*Non-conference game. ^{#}Rankings from AP Poll. (#) Tournament seedings in parentheses. All times are in Eastern Time.
