= 2014–15 Fairleigh Dickinson Knights men's basketball team =

American college basketball season

2014–15 Fairleigh Dickinson Knights men's basketball
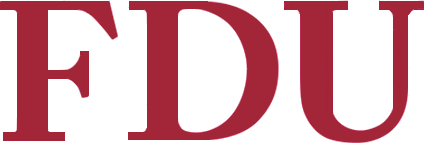
- Conference: Northeast Conference
- Record: 8–21 (3–15 NEC)
- Head coach: Greg Herenda (2nd season)
- Associate head coach: Bruce Hamburger
- Assistant coaches: Dwayne Lee; Grant Billmeier
- Home arena: Rothman Center

2014–15 Northeast Conference men's basketball standings
	Conf.				Overall
Team	W		L	PCT	W		L	PCT
St. Francis Brooklyn	15	–	3	.833	23	–	12	.657
Robert Morris †	12	–	6	.667	20	–	15	.571
Bryant	12	–	6	.667	16	–	15	.516
Mount St. Mary's	11	–	7	.611	15	–	15	.500
Saint Francis	9	–	9	.500	16	–	16	.500
Sacred Heart	9	–	9	.500	15	–	17	.469
LIU Brooklyn	8	–	10	.444	12	–	18	.400
Wagner	8	–	10	.444	10	–	20	.333
Fairleigh Dickinson	3	–	15	.167	8	–	21	.276
Central Connecticut	3	–	15	.167	5	–	26	.161
† 2015 NEC tournament winner

The 2014–15 Fairleigh Dickinson Knights men's basketball team represented Fairleigh Dickinson University during the 2014–15 NCAA Division I men's basketball season. The team was led by second year head coach Greg Herenda. The Knights played their home games at the Rothman Center and were members of the Northeast Conference.

They finished the season 8–21, 3–15 in NEC play to finish in a tie for ninth place. They failed to qualify for the NEC Tournament.

== Roster ==
Number	Name	Position	Height	Weight	Year	Hometown
1	Stephan Jiggetts	Guard	6–1	205	Freshman	Forestville, Maryland
2	Malachi Nix	Guard	5–8	165	Sophomore	Evanston, Illinois
3	Matt MacDonald	Guard	6–5	200	Sophomore	Buffalo, New York
5	Earl Potts Jr.	Guard	6–6	195	Freshman	Severn, Maryland
13	Scott Kingsley	Guard	6–5	190	Sophomore	Chicago, Illinois
15	Marques Townes	Guard	6–4	210	Freshman	Edison, New Jersey
20	Xavier Harris	Forward	6–6	230	Junior	Philadelphia, Pennsylvania
21	Myles Mann	Forward	6–6	225	Sophomore	Atlanta, Georgia
22	Darian Anderson	Guard	6–1	155	Freshman	Washington, DC
23	Terrell Bagley	Guard	6–4	190	Freshman	Linden, New Jersey
24	Mustafaa Jones	Guard	6–3	180	Senior	Philadelphia, Pennsylvania
34	Tyrone O'Garro	Forward	6–6	210	Junior	Newark, New Jersey
35	Darius Stokes	Forward	6–7	205	Graduate	Marion, Iowa

== Schedule ==
Date time, TV	Opponent	Result	Record	Site (attendance) city, state
Regular season
11/14/2014*; 7:00 pm	at Saint Joseph's	W 58–57	1–0	Hagan Arena (4,200); Philadelphia, PA
11/17/2014*; 7:00 pm	FDU Florham	W 102–61	2–0	Rothman Center (450); Hackensack, NJ
11/19/2014*; 7:30 pm	at Rutgers	L 44–61	2–1	Louis Brown Athletic Center (4,102); New Brunswick, NJ
11/25/2014*; 7:00 pm	at Columbia	L 47–57	2–2	Levien Gymnasium (770); Manhattan, NY
11/30/2014*; 2:00 pm	Lafayette	L 61–82	2–3	Rothman Center (412); Hackensack, NJ
12/3/2014*; 9:30 pm	Princeton	W 89–85	3–3	Rothman Center (1,093); Hackensack, NJ
12/6/2014*; 8:00 pm, ESPN3	at Notre Dame	L 57–75	3–4	Edmund P. Joyce Center (6,991); South Bend, IN
12/10/2014*; 8:00 pm, CBSSN	at No. 24 St. John's	L 52–74	3–5	Carnesecca Arena (4,528); Queens, NY
12/20/2014*; 2:00 pm	Delaware	W 76–74	4–5	Rothman Center (502); Hackensack, NJ
12/23/2014*; 4:00 pm	at Saint Peter's	L 60–69	4–6	Yanitelli Center (221); Jersey City, NJ
12/29/2014*; 7:00 pm	at Towson	W 85–84 ^{OT}	5–6	SECU Arena (1,664); Towson, MD
1/3/2015; 3:30 pm	at Central Connecticut	W 73–67	6–6 (1–0)	William H. Detrick Gymnasium (912); New Britain, CT
1/5/2015; 7:30 pm	at LIU Brooklyn	W 75–69	7–6 (2–0)	Steinberg Wellness Center (1,041); Brooklyn, NY
1/8/2015; 7:00 pm	St. Francis Brooklyn	L 69–78	7–7 (2–1)	Rothman Center (682); Hackensack, NJ
1/10/2015; 4:00 pm	at Bryant	L 60–73	7–8 (2–2)	Chace Athletic Center (427); Smithfield, RI
1/15/2015; 7:00 pm	Mount St. Mary's	L 51–71	7–9 (2–3)	Rothman Center (712); Hackensack, NJ
1/17/2015; 4:30 pm	Wagner	L 68–82	7–10 (2–4)	Rothman Center (853); Hackensack, NJ
1/22/2015; 7:00 pm	at Sacred Heart	L 77–78 ^{OT}	7–11 (2–5)	William H. Pitt Center (426); Fairfield, CT
1/24/2015; 4:30 pm	LIU Brooklyn	L 76–80	7–12 (2–6)	Rothman Center (812); Hackensack, NJ
1/29/2015; 7:00 pm	at Robert Morris	L 65–87	7–13 (2–7)	Charles L. Sewall Center (718); Moon Township, PA
1/31/2015; 4:00 pm	at Saint Francis (PA)	L 63–68	7–14 (2–8)	DeGol Arena (1,181); Loretto, PA
2/5/2015; 9:00 pm	Saint Francis (PA)	L 60–64	7–15 (2–9)	Rothman Center (932); Hackensack, NJ
2/7/2015; 4:30 pm	Robert Morris	L 62–76	7–16 (2–10)	Rothman Center (718); Hackensack, NJ
2/12/2015; 7:00 pm	Bryant	L 71–74	7–17 (2–11)	Rothman Center (613); Hackensack, NJ
2/14/2015; 4:00 pm	at Wagner	L 79–83 ^{OT}	7–18 (2–12)	Spiro Sports Center (1,087); Staten Island, NY
2/19/2015; 7:00 pm	at St. Francis Brooklyn	L 54–70	7–19 (2–13)	Generoso Pope Athletic Complex (670); Brooklyn, NY
2/21/2015; 2:00 pm	at Mount St. Mary's	L 64–75	7–20 (2–14)	Knott Arena (674); Emmitsburg, MD
2/26/2015; 7:00 pm	Sacred Heart	L 85–90	7–21 (2–15)	Rothman Center (509); Hackensack, NJ
2/28/2015; 4:30 pm	Central Connecticut	W 73–66	8–21 (3–15)	Rothman Center (639); Hackensack, NJ
*Non-conference game. ^{#}Rankings from AP Poll. (#) Tournament seedings in parentheses. All times are in Eastern Time..
