= 2014–15 Saint Francis Red Flash men's basketball team =

American college basketball season

2014–15 Saint Francis Red Flash men's basketball

CIT, First round
- Conference: Northeast Conference
- Record: 16–16 (9–9 NEC)
- Head coach: Rob Krimmel (3rd season)
- Assistant coaches: Mike Summey; Eric Taylor; Will Holland
- Home arena: DeGol Arena

2014–15 Northeast Conference men's basketball standings
	Conf.				Overall
Team	W		L	PCT	W		L	PCT
St. Francis Brooklyn	15	–	3	.833	23	–	12	.657
Robert Morris †	12	–	6	.667	20	–	15	.571
Bryant	12	–	6	.667	16	–	15	.516
Mount St. Mary's	11	–	7	.611	15	–	15	.500
Saint Francis	9	–	9	.500	16	–	16	.500
Sacred Heart	9	–	9	.500	15	–	17	.469
LIU Brooklyn	8	–	10	.444	12	–	18	.400
Wagner	8	–	10	.444	10	–	20	.333
Fairleigh Dickinson	3	–	15	.167	8	–	21	.276
Central Connecticut	3	–	15	.167	5	–	26	.161
† 2015 NEC tournament winner

The 2014–15 Saint Francis Red Flash men's basketball team represented Saint Francis University during the 2014–15 NCAA Division I men's basketball season. The Red Flash, led by third year head coach Rob Krimmel, played their home games at the DeGol Arena and were members of the Northeast Conference. They finished the season 16–16, 9–9 in NEC play to finish in a tie for fifth place. They advanced to the semifinals of the NEC tournament where they lost to St. Francis Brooklyn. They were invited to the CollegeInsider.com Tournament where they lost in the first round to Bowling Green.

== Roster ==
Number	Name	Position	Height	Weight	Year	Hometown
0	Stephon Whyatt	Guard	6–1	155	Senior	Jersey City, New Jersey
1	Malik Harmon	Guard	5–11	194	Sophomore	Queens, New York
3	Michael Clark	Forward	6–7	200	Freshman	St. Petersburg, Florida
5	Daniel Wallace	Forward	6–8	215	Center/Forward	Suffolk, Virginia
10	Dalton Cesarz	Guard	6–1	165	Sophomore	Nanty Glo, Pennsylvania
11	Ben Millaud-Meunier	Guard	6–1	185	Junior	Montreal, Quebec, Canada
12	Greg Brown	Guard	6–2	183	Junior	Odenton, Maryland
14	Dominique Major	Guard	5–9	167	Senior	Woodbridge, Virginia
15	Earl Brown	Forward	6–6	206	Senior	Philadelphia, Pennsylvania
20	Aric Gresko	Guard	5–10	165	Junior	Clymer, Pennsylvania
21	Simon Pittman	Guard	6–4	205	Freshman	Sherrill, New York
22	Ollie Jackson	Guard	6–3	163	Senior	Dallas, Texas
23	Georgios Angelou	Guard	6–1	185	Sophomore	Halkida, Greece
33	Patrick Wrencher	Forward	6–6	250	Sophomore	West Chester, Ohio
35	Basil Thompson	Forward	6–6	187	Freshman	Philadelphia, Pennsylvania
40	Ronnie Drinnon	Forward	6–7	225	Junior	Jamestown, Ohio

== Schedule ==
Date time, TV	Opponent	Result	Record	Site (attendance) city, state
Regular season
11/14/2014*; 7:00 pm, ESPN3	at Cincinnati	L 37–52	0–1	Fifth Third Arena (7,114); Cincinnati, OH
11/17/2014*; 7:30 pm	at American	L 46–49	0–2	Bender Arena (1,562); Washington, DC
11/20/2014*; 7:00 pm	Keystone	W 102–69	1–2	DeGol Arena (1,017); Loretto, PA
11/24/2014*; 4:00 pm	Maryland Eastern Shore	W 57–53	2–2	DeGol Arena (910); Loretto, PA
11/25/2014*; 7:00 pm	at No. 7 Texas	L 46–78	2–3	Frank Erwin Center (9,356); Austin, TX
11/29/2014*; 1:00 pm	at Navy	W 85–68	3–3	Alumni Hall (868); Annapolis, MD
12/03/2014*; 7:00 pm	at Lehigh	L 59–61	3–4	Stabler Arena (643); Bethlehem, PA
12/06/2014*; 2:00 pm	Albany	W 69–59	4–4	DeGol Arena (1,142); Loretto, PA
12/17/2014*; 7:00 pm	at Duquesne	W 67–52	5–4	A. J. Palumbo Center (1,398); Pittsburgh, PA
12/20/2014*; 2:00 pm	at Rutgers	W 73–68	6–4	Louis Brown Athletic Center (4,977); New Brunswick, NJ
12/30/2014*; 7:00 pm	at NJIT	L 65–77	6–5	Fleisher Center (704); Newark, NJ
01/03/2015; 4:00 pm	Wagner	W 85–68	7–5 (1–0)	DeGol Arena (722); Loretto, PA
01/05/2015; 7:00 pm	Robert Morris	W 66–59	8–5 (2–0)	DeGol Arena (792); Loretto, PA
01/08/2015; 7:00 pm	at Bryant	L 54–80	8–6 (2–1)	Chace Athletic Center (603); Smithfield, RI
01/10/2015; 3:30 pm	at Sacred Heart	W 77–68	9–6 (3–1)	William H. Pitt Center (406); Fairfield, CT
01/16/2015; 7:00 pm	Sacred Heart	W 79–78	10–6 (4–1)	DeGol Arena (839); Loretto, PA
01/18/2015; 2:00 pm	St. Francis Brooklyn	L 59–60	10–7 (4–2)	DeGol Arena (1,106); Loretto, PA
01/22/2015; 7:00 pm	at Wagner	L 58–63	10–8 (4–3)	Spiro Sports Center (1,247); Staten Island, NY
01/24/2015; 2:30 pm	at Mount St. Mary's	L 40–52	10–9 (4–4)	Knott Arena (2,524); Emmitsburg, MD
01/29/2015; 7:00 pm	Bryant	W 75–68	11–9 (5–4)	DeGol Arena (952); Loretto, PA
01/31/2015; 4:00 pm	Fairleigh Dickinson	W 68–63	12–9 (6–4)	DeGol Arena (1,181); Loretto, PA
02/05/2015; 7:00 pm	at Fairleigh Dickinson	W 64–60	13–9 (7–4)	Rothman Center (932); Hackensack, NJ
02/07/2015; 4:30 pm	at LIU Brooklyn	L 60–66	13–10 (7–5)	Steinberg Wellness Center (1,478); Brooklyn, NY
02/12/2015; 7:00 pm	Central Connecticut	W 74–63	14–10 (8–5)	DeGol Arena (1,076); Loretto, PA
02/14/2015; 1:00 pm	LIU Brooklyn	L 74–79 ^{OT}	14–11 (8–6)	DeGol Arena (1,021); Loretto, PA
02/19/2015; 7:00 pm	at Central Connecticut	L 50–53	14–12 (8–7)	William H. Detrick Gymnasium (1,101); New Britain, CT
02/21/2015; 4:00 pm	at St. Francis Brooklyn	L 54–66	14–13 (8–8)	Generoso Pope Athletic Complex (877); Brooklyn, NY
02/26/2015; 7:00 pm	Mount St. Mary's	W 63–60	15–13 (9–8)	DeGol Arena (1,284); Loretto, PA
02/28/2015; 4:00 pm	at Robert Morris	L 70–71 ^{OT}	15–14 (9–9)	Charles L. Sewall Center (2,147); Moon Township, PA
NEC tournament
03/04/2015; 7:00 pm	at Mount St. Mary's; Quarterfinals	W 73–58	16–14	Knott Arena (1,068); Emmitsburg, MD
03/07/2015; 2:00 pm, FCS/MSG	at St. Francis Brooklyn; Semifinals	L 48–62	16–15	Generoso Pope Athletic Complex (954); Brooklyn, NY
CIT
03/17/2015*; 7:00 pm	Bowling Green; First round	L 64–67	16–16	DeGol Arena (1,182); Loretto, PA
*Non-conference game. ^{#}Rankings from AP Poll. (#) Tournament seedings in parentheses. All times are in Eastern Time..
