= 2014–15 LIU Brooklyn Blackbirds men's basketball team =

American college basketball season

2014–15 LIU Brooklyn Blackbirds men's basketball
- Conference: Northeast Conference
- Record: 12–18 (8–10 NEC)
- Head coach: Jack Perri (3rd season)
- Assistant coaches: Mark Calzonetti; Jason Harris; Chuck Bridge
- Home arena: Steinberg Wellness Center; Barclays Center

2014–15 Northeast Conference men's basketball standings
	Conf.				Overall
Team	W		L	PCT	W		L	PCT
St. Francis Brooklyn	15	–	3	.833	23	–	12	.657
Robert Morris †	12	–	6	.667	20	–	15	.571
Bryant	12	–	6	.667	16	–	15	.516
Mount St. Mary's	11	–	7	.611	15	–	15	.500
Saint Francis	9	–	9	.500	16	–	16	.500
Sacred Heart	9	–	9	.500	15	–	17	.469
LIU Brooklyn	8	–	10	.444	12	–	18	.400
Wagner	8	–	10	.444	10	–	20	.333
Fairleigh Dickinson	3	–	15	.167	8	–	21	.276
Central Connecticut	3	–	15	.167	5	–	26	.161
† 2015 NEC tournament winner

The 2014–15 LIU Brooklyn Blackbirds men's basketball team represented The Brooklyn Campus of Long Island University during the 2014–15 NCAA Division I men's basketball season. The Blackbirds, led by third year head coach Jack Perri, played their home games at the Steinberg Wellness Center, with several home games at the Barclays Center, and were members of the Northeast Conference. They finished the season 12–18, 8–10 in NEC play to finish in a tie for seventh place. They lost in the quarterfinals of the NEC tournament to St. Francis Brooklyn.

== Roster ==
2014–15 Long Island Blackbirds men's basketball team
Players
Coaches

Pos.	#	Name	Height	Weight	Year	Hometown
G/F	0	Trevin Woods	6 ft 6 in (1.98 m)	205 lb (93 kg)	Fr	Houston, Texas
F		Landon Atterberry	6 ft 6 in (1.98 m)	210 lb (95 kg)	Sr	Detroit, Michigan
F	2	Jerome Frink	6 ft 7 in (2.01 m)	230 lb (104 kg)	Jr	Jersey City, New Jersey
G	3	Iverson Fleming	6 ft 1 in (1.85 m)	160 lb (73 kg)	So	North Brunswick, New Jersey
G	4	Garrell Martin	6 ft 2 in (1.88 m)	175 lb (79 kg)	Sr	Bronx, New York
G/F	5	Trevon Woods	6 ft 6 in (1.98 m)	200 lb (91 kg)	Fr	Houston, Texas
G	10	Elvar Friðriksson	6 ft 0 in (1.83 m)	165 lb (75 kg)	Fr	Reykjanesbær, Iceland
G	11	Joel Hernandez	6 ft 3 in (1.91 m)	180 lb (82 kg)	So	Teaneck, New Jersey
G	12	Jamil Hood	6 ft 1 in (1.85 m)	175 lb (79 kg)	Fr	Albany, New York
F	15	Nura Zanna	6 ft 7 in (2.01 m)	240 lb (109 kg)	RS Fr	Kaduna, Nigeria
F	20	Chris Carter	6 ft 8 in (2.03 m)	200 lb (91 kg)	Sr	Raleigh, North Carolina
F/C	23	Glenn Feidanga	6 ft 8 in (2.03 m)	240 lb (109 kg)	So	Bangui, Central African Republic
G	24	Martin Hermannsson	6 ft 3 in (1.91 m)	170 lb (77 kg)	Fr	Reykjavík, Iceland
F	32	Jonathan Tshibuy	6 ft 5 in (1.96 m)	235 lb (107 kg)	Jr	Montreal, Quebec
F	42	Mark Parisi	5 ft 11 in (1.8 m)	165 lb (75 kg)	Fr	New York City, New York

Head coach

- Jack Perri (Bentley)

Assistant coach(es)

- Mark Calzonetti (Bentley)
- Jason Harris (Rhode Island College)
- Chuck Bridge (Springfield)

Legend

- (C) Team captain
- (S) Suspended
- (I) Ineligible
- (W) Walk-on
- Injured
- Current redshirt

Roster
Last update: 2014-04-07

== Schedule ==
Date time, TV	Opponent	Result	Record	Site (attendance) city, state
Regular Season
November 19, 2014*; 7:30 pm, ESPN3	at St. John's; NIT Season Tip-Off	L 53–66	0–1	Carnesecca Arena (3,733); Queens, NY
November 25, 2014*; 7:00 pm	at Saint Joseph's; NIT Season Tip-Off	L 70–74	0–2	Hagan Arena (3,243); Philadelphia, PA
November 27, 2014*; 4:00 pm, ESPNU	vs. Stony Brook; NIT Season Tip-Off	L 54–73	0–3	Madison Square Garden (N/A); New York, NY
November 30, 2014*; 4:00 pm, ESPN3	at Temple	L 56–70	0–4	Liacouras Center (3,852); Philadelphia, PA
December 03, 2014*; 7:00 pm	New Hampshire	L 56–72	0–5	Steinberg Wellness Center (1,112); Brooklyn, NY
December 06, 2014*; 2:00 pm	Lehigh	L 76–80	0–6	Steinberg Wellness Center (1,058); Brooklyn, NY
December 09, 2014*; 7:00 pm	at Maine	W 83–70	1–6	Alfond Arena (997); Orono, ME
December 14, 2014*; 3:30 pm	NJIT	W 65–49	2–6	Steinberg Wellness Center (1,419); Brooklyn, NY
December 18, 2014*; 7:00 pm	FIU	L 58–69	3–6	Barclays Center (1,078); Brooklyn, NY
December 22, 2014*; 7:00 pm	at New Hampshire	W 73–72 ^{OT}	4–6	Lundholm Gym (532); Durham, NH
December 28, 2014*; 2:30 pm	Hofstra; Brooklyn Hoops Winter Festival	L 62–88	4–7	Barclays Center (6,032); Brooklyn, NY
January 03, 2015; 4:30 pm	Bryant	L 63–67	4–8 (0–1)	Steinberg Wellness Center (1,143); Brooklyn, NY
January 05, 2015; 7:30 pm	Fairleigh Dickinson	L 69–75	4–9 (0–2)	Steinberg Wellness Center (1,041); Brooklyn, NY
January 08, 2015; 7:30 pm	Sacred Heart	W 82–81 ^{2OT}	5–9 (1–2)	Steinberg Wellness Center (1,041); Brooklyn, NY
January 10, 2015; 4:00 pm	at Wagner	L 82–87	5–10 (1–3)	Spiro Sports Center (1,723); Staten Island, NY
January 15, 2015; 7:00 pm	at Central Connecticut	W 71–66	6–10 (2–3)	William H. Detrick Gymnasium (1,112); New Britain, CT
January 17, 2015; 2:30 pm	Mount St. Mary's	L 54–61	6–11 (2–4)	Barclays Center (2,032); Brooklyn, NY
January 22, 2015; 7:00 pm	at Bryant	L 69–74	6–12 (2–5)	Chace Athletic Center (947); Smithfield, RI
January 24, 2015; 4:30 pm	at Fairleigh Dickinson	W 80–76	7–12 (3–5)	Rothman Center (812); Teaneck, NJ
January 29, 2015; 7:00 pm	Central Connecticut	W 67–55	8–12 (4–5)	Steinberg Wellness Center (1,431); Brooklyn, NY
January 31, 2015; 4:00 pm	at St. Francis Brooklyn; Battle of Brooklyn	L 64–81	8–13 (4–6)	Generoso Pope Athletic Complex (400); Brooklyn, NY
February 5, 2015; 7:00 pm	Robert Morris	W 72–65	9–13 (5–6)	Steinberg Wellness Center (1,271); Brooklyn, NY
February 7, 2015; 4:30 pm	Saint Francis (PA)	W 66–60	10–13 (6–6)	Steinberg Wellness Center (1,478); Brooklyn, NY
February 12, 2015; 7:00 pm	at Robert Morris	W 63–62	11–13 (7–6)	Charles L. Sewall Center (1,013); Moon Township, PA
February 14, 2015; 1:00 pm	at Saint Francis (PA)	W 79–74 ^{OT}	12–13 (8–6)	DeGol Arena (1,021); Loretto, PA
February 19, 2015; 7:00 pm	at Mount St. Mary's	L 65–82	12–14 (8–7)	Knott Arena (1,147); Emmitsburg, MD
February 21, 2015; 4:30 pm	Wagner	L 47–60	12–15 (8–8)	Steinberg Wellness Center (1,217); Brooklyn, NY
February 26, 2015; 7:00 pm, FCS/MSG+	St. Francis Brooklyn	L 69–74 ^{OT}	12–16 (8–9)	Steinberg Wellness Center (1,527); Brooklyn, NY
February 28, 2015; 7:00 pm	at Sacred Heart	L 73–84	12–17 (8–10)	William H. Pitt Center (580); Fairfield, CT
NEC tournament
March 4, 2015; 7:00 pm	at St. Francis Brooklyn; Quarterfinals	L 70–79	12–18	Generoso Pope Athletic Complex (972); Brooklyn, NY
*Non-conference game. ^{#}Rankings from AP Poll. (#) Tournament seedings in parentheses. All times are in Eastern Time.
