= 2014–15 Sacred Heart Pioneers men's basketball team =

American college basketball season

2014–15 Sacred Heart Pioneers men's basketball
- Conference: Northeast Conference
- Record: 15–17 (9–9 NEC)
- Head coach: Anthony Latina (2nd season)
- Assistant coaches: Johnny Kidd; Kevin Papacs; Kyle Steinway
- Home arena: William H. Pitt Center

2014–15 Northeast Conference men's basketball standings
	Conf.				Overall
Team	W		L	PCT	W		L	PCT
St. Francis Brooklyn	15	–	3	.833	23	–	12	.657
Robert Morris †	12	–	6	.667	20	–	15	.571
Bryant	12	–	6	.667	16	–	15	.516
Mount St. Mary's	11	–	7	.611	15	–	15	.500
Saint Francis	9	–	9	.500	16	–	16	.500
Sacred Heart	9	–	9	.500	15	–	17	.469
LIU Brooklyn	8	–	10	.444	12	–	18	.400
Wagner	8	–	10	.444	10	–	20	.333
Fairleigh Dickinson	3	–	15	.167	8	–	21	.276
Central Connecticut	3	–	15	.167	5	–	26	.161
† 2015 NEC tournament winner

The 2014–15 Sacred Heart Pioneers men's basketball team represented Sacred Heart University during the 2014–15 NCAA Division I men's basketball season. This was the Pioneers' 16th season of NCAA Division I basketball, all played in the Northeast Conference. The Pioneers were led by second year head coach Anthony Latina and played their home games at the William H. Pitt Center. They finished the season 15–17, 9–9 in NEC play to finish in a tie for fifth place. They lost in the quarterfinals of the NEC tournament to Bryant.

== Roster ==
Number	Name	Position	Height	Weight	Year	Hometown
1	Cane Broome	Guard	6–0	150	Freshman	East Hartford, Connecticut
2	Evan Kelley	Guard	6–4	185	Senior	Norwalk, Connecticut
3	Cole Walton	Center	6–11	215	Sophomore	Bellevue, Washington
4	Phil Gaetano	Guard	5–10	160	Senior	Wallingford, Connecticut
5	De'von Barnett	Forward	6–5	193	Sophomore	Waldorf, Maryland
10	Jordan Allen	Forward	6–6	200	Graduate	Bayshore, New York
11	Chris Robinson	Guard	6–3	153	Freshman	The Bronx, New York
20	Matej Buovac	Forward	6–7	215	Junior	Zagreb, Croatia
21	Brett Buser	Guard	6–0	160	Freshman	North Granby, Connecticut
24	Vince Fritz	Guard	6–2	203	Freshman	Overland Park, Kansas
30	Eyimofe Edukugho	Forward	6–6	210	Junior	Warri, Nigeria
31	Steve Glowiak	Guard	6–3	181	Senior	New Britain, Connecticut
32	Travis Berry	Guard	6–4	175	Sophomore	Elmont, New York
33	Filip Nowicki	Center	6–10	260	Freshman	Wloclawek, Poland
34	Tevin Falzon	Forward	6–7	229	Junior	Newton, Massachusetts

Roster:

== Schedule ==
Date time, TV	Opponent	Result	Record	Site (attendance) city, state
Regular season
11/14/2014*; 8:00 pm	vs. Hartford; Connecticut 6 Classic	W 71–53	1–0	TD Bank Sports Center (750); Hamden, CT
11/20/2014*; 7:00 pm	UMass Lowell	W 57–54	1–1	William H. Pitt Center (N/A); Fairfield, CT
11/23/2014*; 7:00 pm, BTN	at No. 20 Ohio State	L 48–106	1–2	Value City Arena (12,941); Columbus, OH
11/26/2014*; 2:00 pm	at James Madison	L 72–79	1–3	Convocation Center (2,548); Harrisonburg, VA
11/30/2014*; 3:30 pm	Campbell	W 71–62	2–3	William H. Pitt Center (N/A); Fairfield, CT
12/03/2014*; 7:00 pm	at Colgate	W 71–70	3–3	Cotterell Court (541); Hamilton, NY
12/06/2014*; 3:30 pm	Holy Cross	L 68–81	4–3	William H. Pitt Center (414); Fairfield, CT
12/08/2014*; 7:00 pm	at Lafayette	L 81–82	4–4	Kirby Sports Center (1,922); Easton, PA
12/14/2014*; 3:30 pm	Mitchell	W 104–68	5–4	William H. Pitt Center (186); Fairfield, CT
12/20/2014*; 5:00 pm	New Hampshire	W 73–60	6–4	William H. Pitt Center (186); Fairfield, CT
12/23/2014*; 7:00 pm, BTN	at Rutgers	L 54–79	6–5	Louis Brown Athletic Center (3,903); New Brunswick, NJ
12/28/2014*; 2:00 pm	at Brown	L 76–79	6–6	Pizzitola Sports Center (539); Providence, RI
12/30/2014*; 7:00 pm	Yale	L 64–70	6–7	William H. Pitt Center (402); Fairfield, CT
01/03/2015; 3:30 pm	St. Francis Brooklyn	L 71–73	6–8 (0–1)	William H. Pitt Center (455); Fairfield, CT
01/05/2015; 7:30 pm	at Central Connecticut	W 75–66	7–8 (1–1)	William H. Pitt Center (345); Fairfield, CT
01/08/2015; 7:00 pm	at LIU Brooklyn	L 81–82 ^{2OT}	7–9 (1–2)	Steinberg Wellness Center (1,041); Brooklyn, NY
01/10/2015; 3:30 pm	Saint Francis (PA)	L 68–77	7–10 (1–3)	William H. Pitt Center (406); Fairfield, CT
01/16/2015; 7:00 pm	at Saint Francis (PA)	L 78–79	7–11 (1–4)	DeGol Arena (839); Loretto, PA
01/18/2015; 1:00 pm	at Robert Morris	L 65–85	7–12 (1–5)	Charles L. Sewall Center (1,006); Moon Township, PA
01/22/2015; 7:00 pm	Fairleigh Dickinson	W 78–77 ^{OT}	8–12 (2–5)	William H. Pitt Center (426); Fairfield, CT
01/24/2015; 4:00 pm	at Bryant	W 83–66	9–12 (3–5)	Chace Athletic Center (782); Smithfield, RI
01/29/2015; 7:00 pm	at Wagner	L 64–75	9–13 (3–6)	Spiro Sports Center (1,632); Staten Island, NY
01/31/2015; 2:00 pm, ESPN3	Mount St. Mary's	L 71–77	9–14 (3–7)	William H. Pitt Center (1,261); Fairfield, CT
02/05/2015; 7:00 pm	Wagner	W 86–75	10–14 (4–7)	William H. Pitt Center (305); Fairfield, CT
02/07/2015; 3:30 pm	Bryant	W 84–75 ^{OT}	11–14 (5–7)	William H. Pitt Center (1,002); Fairfield, CT
02/12/2015; 7:00 pm, MASN/ESPN3	at Mount St. Mary's	W 62–55	12–14 (6–7)	Knott Arena (1,109); Emmitsburg, MD
02/14/2015; 4:00 pm	at St. Francis Brooklyn	L 62–71	12–15 (6–8)	Generoso Pope Athletic Complex (485); Brooklyn, NY
02/19/2015; 7:00 pm	Robert Morris	W 80–76	13–15 (7–8)	William H. Pitt Center (281); Fairfield, CT
02/21/2015; 3:30 pm	at Central Connecticut	L 73–76 ^{OT}	13–16 (7–9)	William H. Detrick Gymnasium (1,492); New Britain, CT
02/26/2015; 7:00 pm	at Fairleigh Dickinson	W 90–85	14–16 (8–9)	Rothman Center (509); Hackensack, NJ
02/28/2015; 3:30 pm	LIU Brooklyn	W 84–73	15–16 (9–9)	William H. Pitt Center (580); Fairfield, CT
NEC tournament
03/04/2015; 7:00 pm	at Bryant; Quarterfinals	L 85–91 ^{2OT}	15–17	Chace Athletic Center (1,188); Smithfield, RI
*Non-conference game. ^{#}Rankings from AP Poll. (#) Tournament seedings in parentheses. All times are in Eastern Time..
