= 2014–15 Robert Morris Colonials men's basketball team =

American College Basketball Season

2014–15 Robert Morris Colonials men's basketball

NEC tournament champions

NCAA tournament, round of 64
- Conference: Northeast Conference
- Record: 20–15 (12–6 NEC)
- Head coach: Andrew Toole (5th season)
- Assistant coaches: Joe Gallo; Robby Pridgen; Tim Lawrence
- Home arena: Charles L. Sewall Center

2014–15 Northeast Conference men's basketball standings
	Conf.				Overall
Team	W		L	PCT	W		L	PCT
St. Francis Brooklyn	15	–	3	.833	23	–	12	.657
Robert Morris †	12	–	6	.667	20	–	15	.571
Bryant	12	–	6	.667	16	–	15	.516
Mount St. Mary's	11	–	7	.611	15	–	15	.500
Saint Francis	9	–	9	.500	16	–	16	.500
Sacred Heart	9	–	9	.500	15	–	17	.469
LIU Brooklyn	8	–	10	.444	12	–	18	.400
Wagner	8	–	10	.444	10	–	20	.333
Fairleigh Dickinson	3	–	15	.167	8	–	21	.276
Central Connecticut	3	–	15	.167	5	–	26	.161
† 2015 NEC tournament winner

The 2014–15 Robert Morris Colonials men's basketball team represented Robert Morris University during the 2014–15 NCAA Division I men's basketball season. The Colonials, led by fifth year head coach Andrew Toole, played their home games at the Charles L. Sewall Center and were members of the Northeast Conference. They finished the season 20–15, 12–6 in NEC play to finish in a tie for second place. They defeated Wagner, Bryant, and St. Francis Brooklyn to be champions of the NEC tournament. They received an automatic bid to the NCAA tournament where they defeated North Florida in the First Four before losing in the second round to Duke.

== Roster ==
Number	Name	Position	Height	Weight	Year	Hometown
1	Lionel Gomis	Forward	6–9	230	Junior	Dakar, Senegal
2	Marcquise Reed	Guard	6–3	180	Freshman	Landover, Maryland
3	Kavon Stewart	Guard	6–0	180	Sophomore	Paterson, New Jersey
4	David Appolon	Guard	6–4	190	Senior	Philadelphia, Pennsylvania
5	Elijah Minnie	Forward	6–8	210	Freshman	Monessen, Pennsylvania
10	Ryan Skovranko	Forward	6–7	190	Freshman	Duquesne, Pennsylvania
11	Rodney Pryor	Guard	6–5	205	Junior	Evanston, Illinois
12	Charles Oliver	Guard	6–3	190	Senior	Scotch Plains, New Jersey
13	Jairus Lyles	Guard	6–2	175	Sophomore	Washington, D.C.
15	Jafar Kinsey	Guard	6–2	185	Freshman	Syracuse, New York
22	Lucky Jones	Guard/Forward	6–5	210	Senior	Newark, New Jersey
24	Aaron Tate	Forward	6–5	220	Junior	New Bern, North Carolina
33	Andre Frederick	Forward	6–8	220	Freshman	Detroit, Michigan

== Schedule ==
Date time, TV	Rank^{#}	Opponent^{#}	Result	Record	Site (attendance) city, state
Non-conference regular season
11/14/2014*; 7:00 pm		Lafayette	L 50–77	0–1	Charles L. Sewall Center (N/A); Moon Township, PA
11/16/2014*; 6:00 pm, ESPNU		at No. 6 North Carolina; Battle 4 Atlantis	L 59–103	0–2	Dean Smith Center (13,579); Chapel Hill, NC
11/19/2014*; 8:00 pm		at Bradley	W 68–61	1–2	Carver Arena (5,086); Peoria, IL
11/22/2014*; 12:00 pm, FS2		at Georgetown	L 66–80	1–3	Verizon Center (8,017); Washington, D.C.
11/26/2014*; 12:00 pm		at Chattanooga; Battle 4 Atlantis	L 46–61	1–4	McKenzie Arena (2,426); Chattanooga, TN
11/27/2014*; 12:00 pm		vs. Louisiana–Monroe; Battle 4 Atlantis	W 71–54	2–4	McKenzie Arena (2,136); Chattanooga, TN
12/2/2014*; 7:00 pm		Youngstown State	L 81–89	2–5	Charles L. Sewall Center (890); Moon Township, PA
12/7/2014*; 1:00 pm		Buffalo	L 59–74	2–6	Charles L. Sewall Center (433); Moon Township, PA
12/13/2014*; 4:00 pm		Duquesne	W 75–59	3–6	Charles L. Sewall Center (2,024); Moon Township, PA
12/17/2014*; 7:00 pm		at Toledo	L 57–83	3–7	Savage Arena (4,120); Toledo, OH
12/22/2014*; 7:00 pm		Delaware	W 84–81	4–7	Charles L. Sewall Center (657); Moon Township, PA
12/30/2014*; 7:00 pm, ESPN3		at Clemson	L 57–64	4–8	Littlejohn Coliseum (6,303); Clemson, SC
NEC regular season
1/3/2015; 4:00 pm		Mount St. Mary's	W 70–45	5–8 (1–0)	Charles L. Sewall Center (541); Moon Township, PA
1/5/2015; 7:00 pm		at Saint Francis (PA)	L 59–66	5–9 (1–1)	DeGol Arena (792); Loretto, PA
1/8/2015; 7:00 pm		at Wagner	W 77–73	6–9 (2–1)	Spiro Sports Center (2,055); Staten Island, NY
1/10/2015; 3:30 pm		at Central Connecticut	W 72–60	7–9 (3–1)	William H. Detrick Gymnasium (927); New Britain, CT
1/16/2015; 9:00 pm, ESPNU		St. Francis Brooklyn	L 63–68	7–10 (3–2)	Charles L. Sewall Center (2,349); Moon Township, PA
1/18/2015; 1:00 pm		Sacred Heart	W 85–65	8–10 (4–2)	Charles L. Sewall Center (1,006); Moon Township, PA
1/22/2015; 7:00 pm		at Mount St. Mary's	W 63–59 ^{OT}	9–10 (5–2)	Knott Arena (1,434); Emmitsburg, MD
1/24/2015; 4:00 pm, ESPN3		at St. Francis Brooklyn	W 67–65	10–10 (6–2)	Generoso Pope Athletic Complex (605); Brooklyn, NY
1/29/2015; 7:00 pm		Fairleigh Dickinson	W 87–65	11–10 (7–2)	Charles L. Sewall Center (718); Moon Township, PA
1/31/2015; 7:00 pm		Bryant	L 68–71	11–11 (7–3)	Charles L. Sewall Center (1,172); Moon Township, PA
2/5/2015; 7:00 pm		at LIU Brooklyn	L 65–72	11–12 (7–4)	Steinberg Wellness Center (1,271); Brooklyn, NY
2/7/2015; 4:30 pm		at Fairleigh Dickinson	W 76–62	12–12 (8–4)	Rothman Center (718); Teaneck, NJ
2/12/2015; 7:00 pm		LIU Brooklyn	L 62–63	12–13 (8–5)	Charles L. Sewall Center (1,013); Moon Township, PA
2/14/2015; 4:00 pm		Central Connecticut	W 53–52	13–13 (9–5)	Charles L. Sewall Center (721); Moon Township, PA
2/19/2015; 7:00 pm		at Sacred Heart	L 76–80	13–14 (9–6)	William H. Pitt Center (281); Fairfield, CT
2/21/2015; 4:00 pm		at Bryant	W 76–70	14–14 (10–6)	Chace Athletic Center (908); Smithfield, RI
2/26/2015; 7:00 pm		Wagner	W 91–59	15–14 (11–6)	Charles L. Sewall Center (1,064); Moon Township, PA
2/28/2015; 4:00 pm		Saint Francis (PA)	W 71–70 ^{OT}	16–14 (12–6)	Charles L. Sewall Center (2,147); Moon Township, PA
Northeast Conference tournament
3/4/2015; 7:00 pm		Wagner; Quarterfinals	W 91–68	17–14	Charles L. Sewall Center (857); Moon Township, PA
3/7/2015; 12:00 pm, FCS/MSG		Bryant; Semifinals	W 66–53	18–14	Charles L. Sewall Center (839); Moon Township, PA
3/10/2015; 7:00 pm, ESPN2		at St. Francis Brooklyn; Championship game	W 66–63	19–14	Generoso Pope Athletic Complex (1,013); Brooklyn, NY
NCAA tournament
3/18/2015*; 6:40 pm, truTV	No. (16 S)	vs. (16 S) North Florida; First Four	W 81–77	20–14	UD Arena (12,592); Dayton, OH
3/20/2015*; 7:10 pm, CBS	No. (16 S)	vs. No. 4 (1 S) Duke; Second round	L 56–85	20–15	Time Warner Cable Arena (16,945); Charlotte, NC
*Non-conference game. ^{#}Rankings from AP Poll,. (#) Tournament seedings in parentheses. All times are in Eastern Time. (#) during NCAA Tournament is seed with Region S=South.
